= Henry T. Backus =

American politician (1809–1877)

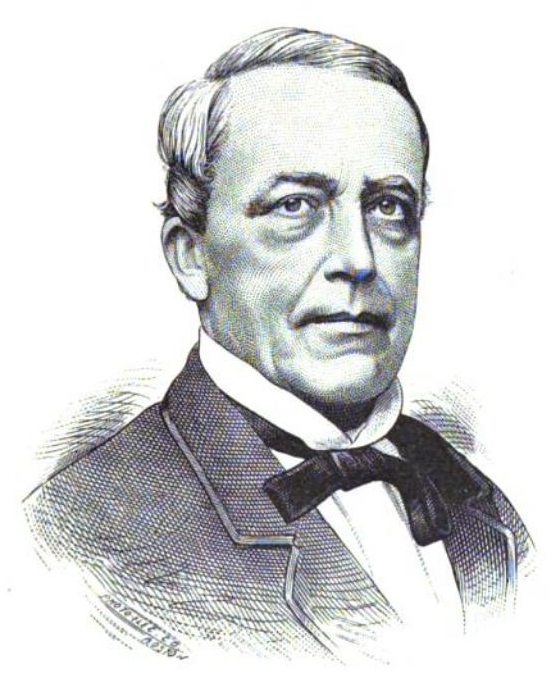

Associate Justice, Arizona Territorial Supreme Court
- In office December 26, 1865 – 1869
- Nominated by: Abraham Lincoln
- Preceded by: William T. Howell
- Succeeded by: John Titus

15th Lieutenant Governor of Michigan
- In office 1861–1862
- Governor: Austin Blair
- Preceded by: Joseph R. Williams
- Succeeded by: Charles S. May

Member of the Michigan Senate
- In office 1860

Member of the Michigan House of Representatives
- In office 1840

Personal details
- Born: April 9, 1809 Norwich, Connecticut
- Died: July 13, 1877 (aged 68) Greenwood, Arizona
- Party: Whig/Republican
- Spouse: Juliana Trumball Woodbridge (m.1835)
- Children: 5

Henry Titus Backus (April 4, 1809 – July 13, 1877) was an American politician from the U. S. state of Michigan and judge from the Arizona Territory.

== Early life ==
Backus was born in Norwich, Connecticut, to James and Dorothy Church (Chandler) Backus on April 4, 1809. He was educated in local schools. Following graduation he worked briefly as a store clerk before he began reading law under Calvin Goddard and attending lectures at Yale University. Backus was admitted to the bar in 1833 and practiced for a short time in Norwich before moving to Michigan.

In Michigan, Backus initially lived in Detroit at the house of his cousin, William Woodbridge. He also formed a law partnership with Woodbridge. He later became senior partner in the law firm, Backus and Harbough. Backus married Woodbridge's daughter, Juliana Trumball, on December 7, 1835. The couple had five children, two of which lived to maturity.

== Politics ==
Backus served as a Whig in the Michigan House of Representatives in 1840 and was a member of the state constitutional convention of 1850. He was Grand Master of Masons in Grand Lodge of Michigan from 1851 to 1853, and later served as alderman from the 9th ward of Detroit from 1860 to 1861.

In 1860, Backus was elected as a Republican to the Michigan Senate and chosen as president pro tempore of the state senate after Joseph R. Williams became lieutenant governor. After the death of Williams a couple months later on June 15, 1861, Backus became the 15th lieutenant governor of Michigan under Austin Blair until January 1863.

== Judicial career ==
Following the resignation of William Thompson Howell from the Arizona bench, U.S. Senator Jacob M. Howard recommended Backus as a replacement. The new Associate Justice received his commission on March 11, 1865. He reached Prescott for the opening of the territorial supreme court's first session on December 26, 1865, and left for his posting in Tucson on January 2, 1866. While he served faithfully during his four years of office, during his spare time he explored the region including trips to the Colorado River and an 1867 journey into Mexico.

As his term neared an end, Backus issued a ruling in a pair of cases that had significant impact upon the territory. The ruling determined that the means of apportionment used by the territory violated the Arizona Organic Act. As a result, the legality of the 3rd, 4th, and 5th Arizona Territorial Legislatures was brought into question. This had the consequence of effectively crippling the territorial government. The issue was not resolved until March 23, 1870, when the United States Congress passed a law confirming the legality of the territorial legislature's actions despite any irregularities that may have occurred.

== Retirement and death ==
Backus declined to seek reappointment, with his term expiring in 1869. He held court in April 1869, but it is unclear when he ceased his tenure on the bench. He returned to his private legal practice in Detroit. In Michigan, he discovered that his health, which included a chronic throat condition, had been helped by the Arizona climate. In 1875, Backus requested appointment to a position in either Arizona or New Mexico territories but no such posting was available. He returned to Arizona Territory in March 1877 and stayed at the home of his friend, Charles T. Hayden of Tempe. In addition to making his home in the territory, the former justice planned to use his "ample fortune" to found the territory's first bank in Prescott. While traveling through Mohave County with Hayden, Backus became ill near the town of Greenwood. Backus died in Greenwood on July 13, 1877. He was initially buried in Greenwood with his remains later moved to Yantic Cemetery in Norwich, Connecticut.

Political offices
Preceded by Joseph R. Williams	Lieutenant Governor of Michigan; 1861–1863	Succeeded by Charles S. May
