= 1st Arizona Territorial Legislature =

Session of the Arizona Territorial Legislature (1864)

| ← | Arizona Organic Act | 2nd | → |

Overview
- Legislative body: Arizona Territorial Legislature
- Jurisdiction: Arizona Territory, United States

Council
- Members: 9
- President: Coles Bashford

House of Representatives
- Members: 18
- Speaker: W. Claude Jones

The 1st Arizona Territorial Legislative Assembly was a session of the Arizona Territorial Legislature which began on September 26, 1864, in Prescott, Arizona, and ran for forty-three days. The session was responsible for enacting Arizona's first legal code, creation of the territory's first four counties, and authorizing a volunteer militia to fight hostile Indians.

== Background ==
Arizona Territory was created by the Arizona Organic Act and officially established on December 29, 1863, in a ceremony performed at Navajo Springs, Arizona. Following completion of an initial census, Governor John N. Goodwin proclaimed an election to select delegates to the first territorial legislature would occur on July 18, 1864. As no counties had been established within Arizona Territory at the time of the election, the territory's three judicial districts were instead used for allocation of delegates. The first district included all of Arizona east of the 114th meridian west and south of the Gila River, the second district was all of Arizona west of the 114th meridian, and the third district included all of Arizona east of the 114th meridian and north of the Gila.

== Legislative session ==
Session was opened by Territorial Secretary Richard C. McCormick on September 26, 1864. All the members of the legislature had not arrived on that date, so the legislature sent out for beverages and tobacco and adjourned to wait for the remaining members to arrive. The session resumed on September 29 with all members present. The territory's Attorney General, Coles Bashford, was selected president of the council while Tucson attorney W. Claude Jones was selected speaker of the House. Two members of the legislature left during the session with Council member José M. Redondo resigning on October 10 on the grounds he was ineligible to hold the office and Representative Henry D. Jackson dying on October 16.

The session met in a recently constructed two-room log cabin. The building was simply furnished with tables and chairs made from roughly hewn boards. The chinking had not been completed, allowing the cold autumn air into the building, and an early winter storm forced the assembly to take shelter in the Governor's house. The assembly members themselves primarily wore frontier dress and many bore weapons used for protection from Indian attack during their journey to and from Prescott.

=== Governor's address ===
Governor Goodwin gave his address to the assembly on September 30, 1864. In his speech, Goodwin reminded the legislature that under the Arizona Organic Act the new territory had inherited the laws of New Mexico Territory and that they would remain in force "until repealed or amended by future legislation". The Governor did not believe that New Mexico's laws were well suited for Arizona's needs and called for a commissioner to be appointed to draft a new legal code. Goodwin also called for the immediate repeal of acts allowing for peonage and imprisonment for debt.

Another key issue was dealing with hostile Indians within the territory. To address this need, Goodwin called for U.S. Army troops and the creation of a volunteer militia. Other issues covered were creation of mail routes and establishment of a public education system, including a public university under the provisions of the Morrill Land-Grant Colleges Act.

=== Howell code ===
The legislature's first act was passed on October 1, 1864, and authorized the Governor to appoint a commissioner to study and propose a legal code for the new territory. Anticipating the need for a new legal code, Judge William T. Howell and Coles Bashford had begun researching a tentative code in April 1864. By the time the legislature met, a 400-page code has been written, based primarily upon the laws of New York and California. After Goodwin was authorized to choose a commissioner, he chose Howell.

Debate over the proposed legal code consumed the majority of the session's efforts. After some modifications, the code was enacted and named the "Howell Code" after its principal architect. The Howell Code underwent a major revision, supervised by Bashford, in 1871 and was replaced in 1877 by the "Hoyt Code".

=== Other legislation ===
In addition to establishing a new legal code, the session also performed several actions to administratively organize the new territory. While the Governor had chosen Prescott as the site of the capital, the legislature had the authority to move the capital. Two other locations were proposed, the first being La Paz and the second a new community named Aztlan to be located at the juncture of the Salt and Verde rivers. Efforts to move the capital to both locations were defeated. Besides considering the location of the capital, the session created Arizona's first four counties. Mohave County encompassed all of the territory north of the Bill Williams River and west of longitude 113° 20' with its seat at Mohave City. Yuma County encompassed the area south of the Bill Williams River and west of longitude 113° 20' with its seat at La Paz. Pima County contained all territory south of the Gila River and east of longitude 113° 20' with its seat at Tucson. The final county, Yavapai, encompassed the area north of the Gila and east of longitude 113° 20' with Prescott serving as its seat.

To deal with hostile Indians, the session requested the U.S. Congress authorize US$250,000 to creation of a ranger force with an additional US$150,000 requested to create reservations along the Colorado River for friendlier tribes. No funds came until 1867 when US$50,000 was authorized. In the meantime a group of Arizona Volunteers consisting of 350 men and 11 officers were organized into five companies. The force provided an effective check against hostile Apaches till the arrival of U.S. Army troops following the American Civil War.

To address educational needs, the legislature authorized a payment of US$250 for public education to any county seats provided the towns provided a matching amount. For Tucson, this amount was doubled to US$500 under the provision that English lessons were added to the daily curriculum. Only two towns collected the funds, the mission school at San Xavier del Bac and a private school in Prescott. The need for roads was addressed by granting six franchises for construction of private roads. The franchisees were required to grade the right of way, build bridges, maintain wells along the route in exchange for the right to charge tolls of US$0.08/mile for wagons and US$0.025/mile for riders on horseback.

Finally the session granted two divorces. The first annulled the marriage of John G. Capron, a member of the territorial House of Representatives, and Sarah Rosser Capron on the grounds that he had been lured into the marriage "by fraudulent concealment of criminal facts". The second divorce was of Fort Whipple's post surgeon, Elliot Coues, from his wife, Sarah A. Richardson Coues.

== Members ==
House of Representatives
| Name | District | Name | District |
|---|---|---|---|
| Nathan B. Appel | First | Norman S. Higgins | First |
| Thomas J. Bidwell | Second | George M. Holaday | Second |
| John M. Boggs | Third | Gilbert W. Hopkins | First |
| Luis G. Bouchet | Second | Henry D. Jackson | First |
| John G. Capron | First | W. Claude Jones (Speaker) | First |
| Jesús M. Elias | First | Jackson McCrackin | Third |
| James Garvin | Third | Daniel H. Stickney | First |
| James S. Giles | Third | Edward D. Tuttle | Second |
| Gregory P. Harte | First | William Walter | Second |

Council
| Name | District |
|---|---|
| Mark Aldrich | First |
| Coles Bashford (President) | First |
| Henry A. Bigelow | Third |
| Patrick H. Dunne | First |
| Robert W. Groom | Third |
| George W. Leihy | Second |
| Francisco S. León | First |
| José M. Redondo | Second |
| King S. Woolsey | Third |
