= 7th Arizona Territorial Legislature =

Session of the Arizona Territorial Legislature (1873)

←	6th	8th	→

Overview
- Legislative body: Arizona Territorial Legislature
- Jurisdiction: Arizona Territory, United States

Council
- Members: 9
- President: J. P. Hargrave

House of Representatives
- Members: 18
- Speaker: Granville H. Oury

The 7th Arizona Territorial Legislative Assembly was a session of the Arizona Territorial Legislature which convened on January 6, 1873, in Tucson, Arizona Territory.

== Background ==
The Indian Wars continued within Arizona Territory. Dissatisfied with the situation, Governor Anson P.K. Safford and Territorial Delegate to Congress Richard C. McCormick had successfully lobbied for a replacement to General George Stoneman as commander of the District of Arizona. Replacing the general was Colonel George Crook who was bringing new methodologies to the fight.

Following the establishment of a public school system by the previous legislature, Arizona's first public school had opened in March 1872. On a more private level, Governor Safford and his wife Jenny had experienced a public falling out of their marriage following the death of their infant son. The situation had escalated to the point where she had printed and distributed pamphlets claiming he had committed marital infidelity and contracted a venereal disease.

== Legislative session ==
The legislative session began on January 6, 1873.

=== Governor's address ===
Governor Safford gave his address to the session on January 17, 1873. In regards to the Apache situation, he stated "The hostility of Indians strikes at the life of our people, retards immigration, prevents development of our resources, and impoverishes the masses."

In more mundane matters, Safford reported on the need to revise the territorial legal code, build a prison, and make provisions for the care of the insane. He also declared Arizona's "great diamond mine" a hoax.

=== Legislation ===
Among the session’s accomplishments was the transfer of a section of Pima County to Maricopa County. They also changed the name of Arizona City to Yuma.

The legislature authorized Governor Safford to print an immigration pamphlet promoting the territory. They also passed a resolution to commend General Crook.

Finally the legislature passed granted a divorce to the Governor and his wife.

== Members ==
House of Representatives
Name	District	Name	District
John B. Allen	Pima	John Montgomery	Pima
John H. Behan	Yavapai	Granville H. Oury (Speaker)	Maricopa
C. H. Brinley	Yuma	José M. Redondo	Yuma
William Cole	Yavapai	Converse W. C. Rowell	Yuma
William C. Davis	Pima	John T. Smith	Pima
George Gleason	Mohave and Yuma	Thomas Stonehouse	Yavapai
Fred Henry	Yavapai	John W. Sweeney	Pima
Lionel M. Jacobs	Pima	J. S. Vosberg	Pima
F. M. Larkin	Pima	Henry Wickenburg	Yavapai

Council
Name	District
Mark Aldrich	Pima
Thomas J. Bidwell	Yuma
Juan Elías	Pima
J. P. Hargrave (President)	Yavapai
W. F. Henning	Yuma and Mohave
A. O. Noyes	Yavapai
Levi Ruggles	Pima
Hiram S. Stevens	Pima
King S. Woolsey	Yavapai and Maricopa
