= Octavius D. Gass =

American prospector and politician (1828–1924)

President of the Arizona Council
- In office 1867–1868
- Preceded by: Mark Aldrich
- Succeeded by: John T. Alsap

Member of the Arizona Council
- In office 1866–1869

Member of the Arizona House of Representatives
- In office 1865–1866

Personal details
- Born: Octavius Decatur Gass; February 29, 1828 Richland County, Ohio, U.S.
- Died: December 10, 1924 (aged 96) Bryn Mawr, California, U.S.
- Resting place: Hillside Cemetery, Redlands, California, U.S.
- Spouse: Mary Virginia Simpson (m. 1872)
- Children: 6
- Parent(s): John Gass; Ann McCleur
- Education: Oberlin College
- Profession: Politician, prospector, businessman

Octavius Decatur "O. D." Gass (February 29, 1828 – December 10, 1924) was an American prospector, businessman, and politician. A four term member of the Arizona Territorial Legislature, he was active in the early history of Las Vegas, Nevada, and the creation of Pah-Ute County, Arizona Territory.

== Early life ==
Gass was born to John and Ann (McCleur) Gass near Mansfield in Richland County, Ohio, on February 29, 1828. He was educated in public schools. Tradition holds he attended Oberlin College but there are no school records confirming this claim. His education did however provide him with a basic knowledge of Spanish and civil engineering.

At the start of the California Gold Rush, Gass took a ship from Baltimore, Maryland, to California by way of Cape Horn, arriving in January 1850. Upon his arrival in San Francisco, Gass earned money unloading prefabricated shelters from a ship. The wages he earned from this job served as a grubstake as be went to El Dorado County to prospect. There he engaged in placer mining and developed a lifelong friendship with Fenton M. Slaughter.

After a few years, and moderate success in their prospecting efforts, Gass and Slaughter moved to the small town of Los Angeles. Gass joined the local Masonic lodge on December 30, 1854, and gained full privileges on November 22, 1855. His ability to speak Spanish and deal with different cultures resulted in Gass being appointed Zanjero of Los Angeles (water steward) for a time.

In addition to his official duties, Gass continued his prospecting efforts. One such endeavour involved a tin deposit in the Temescal Mountains. At the time, the United States imported all its tin, making a tin mine a very lucrative possibility. Gass joined with Slaughter, David Sexton, and several other investors in an attempt to purchase the Rancho Temescal (Serrano), on which the mineral deposit resided, but found that Abel Stearns had already bought the ranch. A scramble for land and mineral rights soon developed as word of the find spread. Gass ended up with several valid claims but the 1860 United States Presidential Election and approach of the American Civil War dried up investor interest. Hopes for riches from the tin deposit soon faded as legal challenges tied up his interests for the next two decades.

== Los Vegas Rancho ==
From Southern California, Gass moved to the El Dorado Canyon, south of modern-day Boulder City, Nevada. He continued his prospecting activities, filing eighteen claims between March 16, 1862, and December 17, 1864. Poor results prompted him to move to the area near modern-day Las Vegas. During his explorations, Gass discovered an outcropping of salt and spent early 1865 working the find.

In late 1865, Gass moved into the old Mormon fort at Las Vegas with Nathaniel Lewis and Lewis Cole. Originally built in 1855, the fort had been abandoned in 1857. Rights to the property were purchased from William Knapp. Knapp in turn had inherited the rights from his brother, Albert, who had been one of the original Mormon missionaries that built the fort. Gass initially owned 160 acres (65 ha) but by 1872 had bought out his partners and owned the entire 640 acres (260 ha) ranch. The name of the ranch was changed to Los Vegas Rancho to differentiate it from Las Vegas, New Mexico.

The abandoned fort was in a state of general disrepair when Gass moved in. He and his partners set about the process of repairing the property and turning it into a way station for travelers using the Old Spanish Trail. Gass and his partners began raising cattle and horses. The fields were planted initially with barley, oats, and wheat with a variety of vegetables and melons added by the second harvest. Orchards were added to produce apples, apricots, figs, and peaches. To all this Gass added 75 acres (30 ha) of Mexican pink beans. The local Paiute, used to mesquite beans, considered the pink beans a luxury and Gass used them in lieu of wages when he hired them to work the fields. Wine from the ranch's vineyard became popular with visiting travelers.

Gass became a financial backer for the nearby town of Callville, Arizona Territory He envisioned the town as a river port which Mormon migrants, traveling up the Colorado River from the Gulf of California, would use on their way to Utah. Gass promoted the town in newspapers and served as the town's postmaster. Gass's dreams for the town never came to fruition as completion of the transcontinental railroad provided an easier means to reach Utah. The town's post office was closed on June 15, 1869.

His position as a businessman and landowner provided Gass with political influence within northwestern Arizona Territory. He leveraged this influence and was elected in 1865 to represent Mohave County in the House of Representatives (lower house) of the 2nd Arizona Territorial Legislature. Upon his arrival in Prescott, Gass discovered only nine other legislators had made the trip to the territorial capital and used the reduced numbers to his advantage. The result was passage of a bill that he drafted which created Pah-Ute County from northern Mohave County and established Callville as the county seat.

== Nevada ==
On May 5, 1866, much of Pah-Ute county, including the area around Gass' Las Vegas Ranch was moved to Lincoln County, Nevada, by the U.S. Congress. Gass initially refused to accept the change and declined to pay Nevada taxes. He and his neighbors petitioned the Nevada legislature to create Las Vegas county from the southern section of Lincoln County, but their request was ignored. Gass also joined with other Arizona politicians to twice complain to Congress about the boundary change. The boundary change became finalized in January 1867 when the Nevada Legislature unanimously accepted the new border.

Despite living in Nevada, Gass continued to represent Pah-Ute county in the Arizona Territorial Legislature for another 3 years. During the 1866 session, he became a member of the council (upper house). He chaired a joint committee on military and Indian affairs and served as the session's Spanish language translator. Gass was elected President of the council during the 4th Arizona Territorial Legislature. During the 5th Arizona Territorial Legislature, Gass represented both Mohave and Pah-Ute counties. To reach the new territorial capital in Tucson, Gass and Andrew S. Gibbons rafted down the Colorado River. The two men chose this route to avoid Indian attack but instead hazarded several sets of rapids in their 14-foot (4.3 m) boat. Upon reaching Yuma they were delayed because a stagecoach had been attacked by Indians, killing all aboard, and a replacement driver was not immediately available. The pair arrived at the session a week late but were able to entertain other legislators with tales of their journey.

Shortly after the boundary change was finalized, Lincoln County began demanding two years of back taxes from their new residents. About 600 Mormon residents along the Muddy River refused to make the payment and instead abandoned their homes to move to Utah. The combination of taxes and the loss of 600 regular customers was a significant financial blow to Gass. In addition to the taxes, Gass needed money to deal continuing legal battles over the Temescal Tin Mine Gass also saw a significant reduction in his political influence as the 600 composed much of his political base. He would later become Lincoln County Justice of the Peace but never regained his previous political sway.

Gass married Mary Virginia Simpson, a niece of Ulysses S. Grant, on February 24, 1872, in Pioche, Nevada. He had met her when her caravan had stopped at his ranch in early 1871. Simpson was traveling with her sister and brother-in-law, Ann and Isaac Jennings, from Los Angeles to Arizona but had been stopped by high water on the Colorado River. Instead of continuing to Arizona, the Jennings bought some farmland near St. Thomas. For close to a year, Gass had made frequent trips to St. Thomas to court Simpson. Following their wedding, the couple had six children, including a set of twins.

The 320 acres (130 ha) Spring ranch was added to Gass's holdings on January 22, 1878. While at the time he appeared to the world as a successful rancher, which 960 acres (390 ha) and 30 employees, Gass had a large level of debt. He was also beginning to worry about how he would provide an education and social opportunities to his children. As early as 1868, Gass began searching for someone interested in buying his ranch. In 1874 he mortgaged his property to William Knapp for $3,000. To pay off this debt he borrowed $5000 in gold from Archibald Stewart in August 1879. Gass had expected a good harvest that year but bad weather destroyed much of his crop. Gass received a 9-month extension but was still unable to pay his debt. As a result, Stewart foreclosed on May 2, 1881.

== Later life ==
Gass and his family left Las Vegas in June 1881 with their personal possessions and 1,500 head of cattle. They drove the cattle to Pomona, California, and sold them to Richard Gird, who was looking for cattle to stock the Rancho Santa Ana del Chino. He then moved to near White Water, California, where he tried growing grapes. Winds and lack of water thwarted his efforts however. Beginning in 1884, Gass joined several groups of prospectors exploring various locations in eastern San Bernardino County, California, and Baja California.

Shortly after 1900, Gass joined his son Fenton in Bryn Mawr, California. There he helped with his son's orange orchard and tended a small garden. Gass died in Bryn Mawr on December 10, 1924 He was buried at Redlands, California's Hillside Cemetery in the Masonic Plot. Gass Peak, the southernmost peak in the Las Vegas Range, and Gass Avenue, a street in Downtown Las Vegas were named in his honor.
