= 5th Arizona Territorial Legislature =

Session of the Arizona Territorial Legislature (1868)

←	4th	6th	→

Overview
- Legislative body: Arizona Territorial Legislature
- Jurisdiction: Arizona Territory, United States

Council
- Members: 9
- President: John T. Alsap

House of Representatives
- Members: 18
- Speaker: Thomas J. Bidwell

The 5th Arizona Territorial Legislative Assembly was a session of the Arizona Territorial Legislature which met from November 10, 1868, to December 16, 1868, in Tucson, Arizona Territory. It was the last of the annual legislative sessions.

== Background ==
In the year preceding the session there had been several important political changes in the territory. On November 1, 1867, the capital had been officially moved from Prescott to Tucson. Additionally, Governor Richard C. McCormick had won election to become Arizona's Territorial Delegate to Congress and was preparing to depart to Washington D.C. His replacement had not yet been named.

Hostilities with the native peoples continued with A. M. Erwin, who had won election to become a member of the session, having been killed by Apache near his home. There was some progress however with most of the Hualapai having been forced onto a reservation. There had also been several infrastructure improvements. During previous year, a telegraph line to Santa Fe had been completed with discussions being held of building a second line to California. Railroads were also in the process of being constructed across the territory.

== Legislative session ==
The thirty-seven-day-long session of the Fourth Legislative Assembly convened in Tucson on November 10, 1868. The session met in an adobe building on Main street belonging to Hiram S. Stevens. Local stories from after the session claimed some meetings occurred in the Congress Street Saloon.

During the session, the House of Representatives had difficulties maintaining a quorum. Only one of the six representatives from Yavapai county attended the session while the delegations from both Mohave and Yuma counties were both a representative short. Additionally, Councilman Octavius D. Gass and Representative Andrew S. Gibbons were late to arrive at the session.

=== Governor's address ===
Governor Richard C. McCormick gave his address to the session on November 16, 1868. He began by thanking the voters for his recent election as Territorial Delegate. The governor then noted that taxable property had increased within Arizona due to a growing economy. Social life was also prospering even though McCormick saw the need for additional volunteers to fight Apache.

=== Legislation ===
The session accomplishments included a number of memorials to the U.S. Congress similar to those sent by previous sessions. Included was a request for additional military assistance in dealing with the Indian Wars. To this was added requests for two new mail routes, one connecting Tucson with Wickenburg via Camp Grant, Florence, Phoenix and Camp McDowell. The second was between Prescott with Albuquerque, New Mexico Territory. A new request was made for establishing a court to resolve the validity of Spanish and Mexican land grants within the territory.

Reverting a change made by the 3rd legislature, the session recreated the office of Territorial Attorney General. Added to this was the new position of county surveyor. To defray territorial expenses, a new tax of US$5 to US$25 was levied on dance halls. Additionally the session authorized building a territorial jail in Phoenix. The jail was never built.

== Members ==
House of Representatives
Name	District	Name	District
John Anderson	Pima	Francis H. Goodwin	Pima
Thomas J. Bidwell (Speaker)	Yuma	Oliver Lindsey	Yuma
Thomas W. Brooks (Note: Did not attend session)	Yavapai	William S. Little	Yavapai
Solomon W. Chambers	Pima	James P. Lugenbul	Yuma
Robert M. Crandal	Pima	E. Lumbley	Pima
Follett G. Cristie	Yavapai	John Owen	Pima
U. C. Doolittle	Mohave	John Smith	Yavapai
Jesús M. Elías	Pima	Hiram S. Stevens	Pima
Andrew S. Gibbons	Pah-Ute	G. R. Wilson	Yavapai

Council
Name	District
John T. Alsap (President)	Yavapai
John G. Campbell	Yavapai
F. M. Chapman	Yavapai
Octavius D. Gass	Mohave and Pah-Ute
Joseph K. Hooper	Yuma
Henry Jenkins (Note: Died during session on November 19, 1868)	Pima
Alexander McKey	Pima
Estevan Ochoa	Pima
Daniel H. Stickney	Pima
