= William Thompson Howell =

American jurist and politician (1810–1870)

William T. Howell

Associate Justice, Arizona Territorial Supreme Court
- In office December 29, 1863 – June 11, 1864
- Nominated by: Abraham Lincoln
- Succeeded by: Henry T. Backus

Personal details
- Born: July 8, 1810 Goshen (town), New York
- Died: April 3, 1870 (aged 59) Newaygo, Michigan
- Party: Democratic/Republican
- Spouse(s): Sophia Brink (1828–1845); Susan M. Hartwell (1847–1856); Sarah Jones (1857–)
- Profession: Attorney

William Thompson Howell (July 8, 1810 – April 3, 1870) was an American jurist and politician. Born and educated in New York, the majority of his career was spent in Michigan where he held a variety of state offices. Howell also served as a judge in the newly formed Arizona Territory where he was a principal author of the territory's first legal code, the Howell Code.

== Background ==
Howell was born on July 8, 1810, in Goshen, New York, to parents of moderate means. He was educated in public schools and was teaching by the age of 16 and editing a newspaper by the time he was 19. He changed professions at the age of 24, becoming an attorney and began practicing in Angelica, New York, before moving to Jonesville, Michigan, in 1837.

Howell married his first wife, Sophia Brink, on May 24, 1828, and the couple had four children. Sophia died in January 1845, with one of the couple's daughters dying several months later. His second marriage was to Susan M. Hartwell on April 29, 1847. In 1853, the couple moved to Jackson, Michigan. Susan died August 27, 1856, and was survived by four children. Howell wed his third wife, Sarah Maria (Gray) Jones in 1857. The third marriage produced two children.

== Michigan ==
Howell began his political career in 1840 when he was appointed district attorney for Hillsdale County. This was followed by his election to the Michigan Senate in 1843, a position he held through 1846. During his senate service, he became President pro tempore on January 6, 1845. Howell's senate service was followed by his becoming the presidential elector for Michigan's third district in 1848. In his role as elector, he voted for Lewis Cass.

Howell was admitted to practice law in front of the Supreme Court of the United States in 1849. Among the causes he advocated were the right of married women to hold property in their own name, abolition of capital punishment, and the establishment of free public schools.

With the establishment of the Republican Party, Howell left the Democratic Party. He served as a circuit court commissioner in 1854 and as a probate judge in 1855 and 1856. In 1857 he moved to Newaygo, Michigan, and when Mecosta County was organized he became Mecosta County's first prosecuting attorney. Howell was elected to represent Newaygo County in the Michigan House of Representatives from 1861 through 1863. He was also Speaker pro-tempore for the 21st and 22nd legislatures.

== Arizona Territory ==
Following the creation of Arizona Territory, President Abraham Lincoln nominated Howell to become a judge for the new territory. His commission as Associate Justice to the Arizona Territorial Supreme Court passed on March 10, 1863. Howell then traveled with Governor John N. Goodwin's party to new territory, and took his oath of office on December 29, 1863. Howell was assigned to Arizona's first judicial district, an area encompassing all of Arizona south of the Gila River and east of the 114th meridian west, and left the temporary capital at Fort Whipple for Tucson on February 3, 1864.

Upon his arrival in Tucson, Howell was unhappy to find "two out of every three people in the area were barefooted" in his new district. His first court session began on May 31, 1864, and lasted for six days. A second session was scheduled to begin on last Tuesday in October. To simplify the administration of justice within the new territory, Howell saw the need for a coherent legal code and began the research needed to create one. With the assistance of his friend Coles Bashford, the judge consulted with local residents and explored the laws of several states. After 90 days effort, a 400-page tentative code was ready.

In April 1864, Howell received word his wife was ill. Bashford requested Howell be given three months leave to see to his wife's needs and to look after his seven surviving children. The leave was granted and Howell left Tucson for Michigan on June 11, 1864.

=== Howell Code ===
In his address to the 1st Arizona Territorial Legislature, Governor Goodwin called for the creation of a new legal code to replace the laws Arizona had inherited from New Mexico Territory. The legislature authorized the Governor to appoint a commissioner to create a possible code, and Goodwin selected Howell as the commissioner. Despite the fact the judge had already left the territory, his code was submitted to the legislature for consideration two days after his appointment as commissioner. The "Howell Code" was approved by the legislative session following considerable debate and some modifications. Territorial Secretary Richard C. McCormick observed the code was heavily influenced by the California and New York legal codes.

The Code was formally adopted in 1864. Its civil and criminal laws aspects came from California and New York. It took mining law from Mexico, and took its community property law from Spain. Its laws were enforced haphazardly as the territory experienced growing pains. Much extrajudicial enforcement occurred in the early years of the territory, including numerous lynchings, such as the Bisbee massacre. But the harsh nature of some laws was also reversed by citizen justice. In one case, a cattle rustler was sentenced to death, and the angry mob that assembled to put him to death changed course after learning that the man had stolen only a calf, and in order to feed his ten children. The mob went back to the judge, asking him to commute the sentence. The judge then changed his ruling, finding the man not guilty on the basis of self-defense.

The Howell Code was substantially reformed in 1901 when the Territorial Legislature ordered the reorganization of the laws. With the statehood of Arizona in 1912, new laws and a new constitution superseded the Howell Code, along with the unruly nature of the Arizona territory.

== Later life ==
Howell returned to Newaygo, Michigan on July 22, 1864, to find his wife "very feeble". After requesting an extension to his leave of absence, he decided not to return to Arizona in early 1865 and instead requested appointment as an Indian Agent in Michigan. The nomination was delayed by President Lincoln and his successor, President Andrew Johnson, chose to nominate a different person.

Newaygo remained Howell's residence until his death on April 3, 1870. His third wife, whose illness prompted his return from Arizona Territory, survived until January 5, 1882. Both were buried in the Newaygo Village Cemetery.
