= 4th Arizona Territorial Legislature =

Session of the Arizona Territorial Legislature (1867)

←	3rd	5th	→

Overview
- Legislative body: Arizona Territorial Legislature
- Jurisdiction: Arizona Territory, United States

Council
- Members: 9
- President: Octavius D. Gass

House of Representatives
- Members: 18
- Speaker: Oliver Lindsey

The 4th Arizona Territorial Legislative Assembly was a session of the Arizona Territorial Legislature which ran from September 4, 1867, till October 7, 1867, in Prescott, Arizona. Among the sessions accomplishments were establishment of the territory's first "permanent" capital and creation of the territory's first school district.

== Background ==
At the time of the session, Arizona Territory was still in the early stages of its development. Transportation was limited but showing signs of improvement. The prior year saw the incorporation of the Atlantic and Pacific Railroad with plans to build tracks along a route near the 35th parallel north. The route would however not be completed across the territory until 1883. To house lawbreakers, a jail was in the process of construction in Yavapai county.

The Indian Wars continued, with the Hualapai, Paiute, and a portion of the Yavapai nations being on the warpath. In an attempt to placate the hostile natives, the U.S. Congress had funded the purchase of agricultural equipment for Indians that agreed to live peacefully. Beyond this, concern over most of Pah-Ute County's land area having been transferred to Nevada continued.

== Legislative session ==
The thirty-four-day-long session of the Fourth Legislative Assembly convened in Prescott on September 4, 1867.

=== Governor's address ===
Governor Richard C. McCormick gave his address to the session on September 9, 1867. His highest concern at the time was the continuation of the Indian Wars, noting "The birds of the air are scarcely more erratic in their movements than the Indians of Arizona." To meet this threat he asked for additional troops, claiming the current level of less than one soldier per 100 square miles (260 km^{2}) insufficient for the need. The governor also sought a reorganization of military forces in the territory from a large number of small, temporary forts to a smaller number of larger forts to free up more troops for deployment in the field. As for a long-term solution, McCormick favored the use of Indian reservation over a policy of extermination.

In other news, farming activities in the Gila River valley had produced cotton, tobacco, fruits, nuts, and a variety of grains. Territorial debt had grown to US$28,375 with the bonds authorized by the 1st Arizona Territorial Legislature coming due within a year. In the area of law enforcement, the territory was unable to fill the offices of U.S. Marshal and United States Attorney due to the positions' low compensation.

Finally, McCormick asked for the United States to purchase additional land from Mexico in order to secure the sea ports at Guaymas and Puerto Libertad for the territory.

=== Legislation ===
The session saw a new law prohibiting the indiscriminate discharge of a firearm on public roads. The act included provisions that also made it a crime to use a deadly weapon during a fight.

Dealing with the organization of the territorial government, the territory's first school district was created within Pima County. More controversial was the selection of Tucson as the territory's first "permanent" capital. Prescott residents were angered by the move and accused several members of the legislature of accepting bribes and Governor McCormick of selling his support for the bill in exchange for assistance in his election to become the Territorial Delegate to Congress. No evidence of actual wrongdoing was ever produced and the capital was officially moved on November 1, 1867. A proposal to create Maricopa County was defeated in the House by an 8–6 vote.

In other matters, the session memorialized the U.S. Congress asking for the US$3 per diem each member of the legislature received be increase to US$6. They also requested the U.S. Army's District of Arizona be removed from the Department of the Pacific and granted its own department.

== Members ==
House of Representatives
Name	District	Name	District
John B. Allen	Pima	G. W. Hanford (Note: Did not attend session.)	Yuma
Underwood C. Barnett	Pima	John Henion	Yuma
Solomon W. Chambers	Pima	Francis M. Hodges	Pima
Edward J. Cook	Yavapai	Charles W. Lewis	Pima
Allen Cullumber	Yavapai	Nathaniel S. Lewis	Mohave
Royal J. Cutler	Pah-Ute	Oliver Lindsey (Speaker)	Yuma
John T. Dare	Yavapai	John H. Matthews	Yavapai
Philip Drachman	Pima	Marvin M. Richardson	Pima
James S. Giles	Yavapai	John A. Rush	Yavapai

Council
Name	District
Octavius D. Gass (President)	Pah-Ute
William H. Hardy	Mohave
Henry Jenkins	Pima
Daniel S. Lount	Yavapai
Alexander McKey	Yuma
Mortimer R. Platt	Pima
John W. Simmons	Yavapai
Lewis A. Stevens	Yavapai
Daniel H. Stickney	Pima
