= Hiram Sanford Stevens =

American politician (1832–1893)

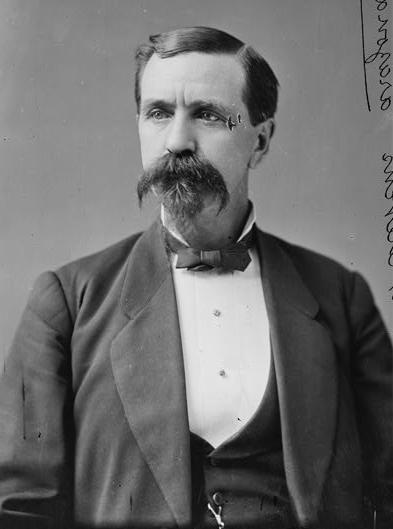

Delegate to the U.S. House of Representatives from Arizona Territory
- In office March 4, 1875 – March 3, 1879
- Preceded by: Richard Cunningham McCormick
- Succeeded by: John Goulder Campbell

Personal details
- Born: March 20, 1832 Weston, Vermont
- Died: March 22, 1893 (aged 61) Tucson, Arizona Territory
- Party: Democratic
- Spouse: Petra Santa Cruz

Military service
- Allegiance: United States
- Branch/service: United States Army
- Years of service: 1851–1853
- Unit: Company I, United States 1st Dragoons

Hiram Sanford Stevens (March 20, 1832 – March 22, 1893) was an American businessman and politician. He served two terms as Arizona Territory's delegate in the United States House of Representatives and three times in the Arizona Territorial Legislature.

== Background ==
Stevens was born in Weston, Vermont, on March 20, 1832. (Note: While almost all sources indicate Stevens was born in Weston, Vermont, the coroner's jury reported he was born in Fort Covington, New York.) He grew up in Weston where he obtained only a "limited education." The 1850 census shows he was working there as a farmer. In 1851, Stevens enlisted in the army and became part of Company I, United States 1st Dragoons. He saw action during his military tour against the Apache in New Mexico Territory. After three years of service he received an honorable discharge while at Fort Thorn.

Following his discharge, Stevens proceeded to Tucson with only a brief stop along the San Pedro River. There he operated a ranch near Sentinel Peak before opening a store in Sacaton in 1858. That year, on August 28, he was baptized at a Catholic church in Tucson under the name "Steven Augustus Hiram."

Following the outbreak of the American Civil War, Stevens left Tucson for a time. He returned to the town in 1864 and was appointed one of Tucson's "councillors" by Governor Goodwin on May 11. The next year he formed a partnership with Samuel C. Hughes to jointly supply the "Mariposa Store." The two men engaged in a variety of business partnerships over the years, occasionally including Hughes' younger brother, Thomas, in their endeavors. In addition to their business partnership the two men became brothers-in-law. Stevens married Petra Santa Cruz while Hughes married her older sister, Atanacia. The Stevens had two adopted children: Elisa and Thomas.

From 1866 until 1872 Stevens was a post trader for Fort Buchanan and Fort Crittenden. He was forced to close his operation when it was discovered he had been selling alcohol to the soldiers illegally. In 1876, Stevens and Hughes formed Hughes, Stevens & Company. The firm was active in cattle, mercantile, and mining interests. At the peak of his career, Stevens also owned a sheep ranch in Colorado and was worth an estimated US$150,000. This made him one of the richest men in the territory.

== Political career ==
Stevens's success in business prompted him to take an interest in politics. He served as Tucson city treasurer, Pima County tax assessor, and was a member of the Pima County Board of Supervisors on multiple occasions. In 1868, Stevens was elected to represent the 5th Arizona Territorial Legislature where he represented Pima County in the House of Representatives (lower house). The session even met in a building owned by Stevens. Stevens was returned to the legislature twice more, serving in the council (upper house) of both the 6th and 7th Arizona Territorial Legislature.

In 1874, Richard Cunningham McCormick decided not to run for reelection as Arizona Territory's delegate in the United States House of Representatives. The territory's Democrats met in Phoenix in May to select nominees for the upcoming election. The two candidates for the Territorial Delegate were Stevens and John A. Rush. With delegates from Yavapai and Yuma counties not yet arrived, the convention selected Rush by an eight to seven vote. Rush refused to accept the nomination and withdrew as a candidate on July 24, 1874. The election then became a five-way race with all candidates running as Independents. Stevens and Charles T. Hayden favored Democratic policies while Curtis Coe Bean and John Smith advocated those of the Republican party. The fifth candidate, stagecoach driver David G. Beardsley, ran as the "workingman's candidate". Stories of the day indicate Stevens enlisted the territory's gamblers to aid his campaign. To do this he is said to have loaned them money to bet on his victory in the election, allowing the gamblers to keep any winnings and asking only for the sum of the wagers to be returned. The election also saw 650 questionable votes for Bean thrown out by the Yavapai County Board of Supervisors. Final results were 1,442 for Stevens, 1,076 for Bean, 638 for Smith, 13 for Hayden and 7 for Beardsley.

Rumors of a possible special session of the U.S. Congress being called prompted Stevens to leave for Washington, D.C., on March 3, 1875. The special session never materialized and Stevens kept himself busy in Washington looking after his business concerns. After the 44th United States Congress convened in December, the new territorial delegate introduced a series of legislative proposals. Among these were requests for funds to construction of a territorial capital and penitentiary, creating of a port of entry in Tucson, and navigation improvements along the Colorado River. One of Stevens' bills that was passed by the Congress allowed the territorial legislature to overrule the Governor's veto with a two-thirds vote. A bill to allow for election of the territorial governor was defeated.

Stevens announced he would seek a second term on June 21, 1876. His opponents were Granville H. Oury and William H. Hardy. Curtis Coe Bean announced his intention to run but withdrew to look after his business interests. During the race, the territorial newspapers expected the incumbent to win reelection. When the election results were being totaled, the Yavapai County Board of Supervisors, in a 2–1 decision, attempted to disqualify 168 votes for Stevens on the grounds that they came from two towns where residents had not paid their poll tax. This was done despite the tax not being due till December 31 and the board's decision to accept the votes from several other towns with similar circumstances but that had voted for a different candidate. A provision in territorial law required the Territorial Secretary to accept the vote canvas provided by the County Recorder thwarted the board's efforts and resulted in Stevens winning a plurality of the vote. Final results were 1,194 for Stevens, 1,049 for Hardy, and 1,007 for Oury.

The 45th United States Congress saw Stevens introduce several new proposals. In addition to a series of appropriation requests, the delegate asked for a modification to the amount of land allocated for army use at Fort Lowell. More important was a change in the size of the Arizona Territorial Legislature. With Arizona's population having grown to around 40,000, Stevens convinced the U.S. Congress to increase the size of the legislature from its previous nine member Council and eighteen member House of Representatives to twelve and twenty-four members respectively.

June 7, 1878 saw Stevens announce his plans to run for a third term. His reelection bid was unsuccessful as he placed third in a five-way race during the 1878 election.

== After office ==
Business activities occupied Stevens' time after he left office. The early 1880s saw him purchase a ranch near Sahuarita and become part owner in the largest general store in Tucson. He additionally became a moneylender, charging the prevailing rate of 2%/month. When Tucson was considering conversion from gas to electric lighting in 1884, Stevens was a major opponent of the proposal. Following his death it was discovered he owned 100,000 shares of Tucson Gas Company stock. In other activities, Stevens was the second President of Arizona Pioneers' Historical Society. Tucson's first Protestant church was built on land he donated and he is credited with planting the area's first pepper trees.

Stevens died from a self-inflicted gunshot wound on March 22, 1893. His business interests had taken a downturn with creditors filing for attachment four days before Stevens' death. Stevens shot his wife, inflicting only a minor wound, and then turned a second gun on himself. Later investigate decided his financial troubles were insufficient to explain the suicide and could only determine the action was taken during a period of severe mental distress. Stevens was buried at Tucson's Catholic cemetery in one of the largest funerals the city had ever seen. His remains were later moved to Tucson's Evergreen Cemetery.

== Legacy ==
Stevens Avenue, just north of downtown Tucson, was named in 1899, in his honor.

== Footnotes ==
U.S. House of Representatives
Preceded by Richard C. McCormick	Delegate to the U.S. House of Representatives from Arizona Territory; 1875–1879	Succeeded by John G. Campbell
