= 3rd Arizona Territorial Legislature =

Session of the Arizona Territorial Legislature (1866)

←	2nd	4th	→

Overview
- Legislative body: Arizona Territorial Legislature
- Jurisdiction: Arizona Territory, United States

Council
- Members: 9
- President: Mark Aldrich

House of Representatives
- Members: 18
- Speaker: Granville H. Oury

The 3rd Arizona Territorial Legislative Assembly was a session of the Arizona Territorial Legislature which ran from October 3 through November 6, 1866, in Prescott, Arizona.

== Background ==
At the time of the session's meeting, Arizona Territory was still in the process of being settled. Roads, postal service, and other forms of infrastructure were limited and Apache posed a threat to the lives and property of American settlers. Governor John Noble Goodwin had been elected Arizona Territory's Delegate and resigned as governor on April 10, 1866. In his place, Territorial Secretary Richard C. McCormick had been appointed the territory's second governor. The other big political concern was that most of Pah-Ute County, created by the previous session, had seen most of its land area transferred by the U.S. Congress to Nevada on December 4, 1865.

== Legislative session ==
The legislative session began in Prescott on October 3, 1866.

=== Governor's address ===
Governor Richard C. McCormick gave his address to the legislature on October 8, 1866. During his speech he noted that a census earlier that year had shown a territorial population of 5,526. There had been "an abundant harvest" produced by local farmers and McCormich believed Arizona's mineral wealth had the potential to promote significant development.

Infrastructure presented continuing problems. The Governor was "ashamed to say that to this day there is not a stage coach running in Arizona". He also denounced the reliability of postal service, claiming faithless mail contractors had abandoned their duties due to the threat posed by Apache. To support the establishment of law and order, McCormick recommended construction of jails and courthouses. He suggested the Apache threat could be dealt with by either moving them to reservations or by an influx of settlers crowding them out.

Financially, Governor McCormick reported that territorial debt had reached US$21,051.40. As a result, he recommended that new expenditures be limited.

=== Legislation ===
The session oversaw a reorganization of the territorial government. The position of Territorial Attorney general was dissolved while a district attorney office was created. The Board of Territorial Auditor was likewise eliminated with a new Territorial Auditor position taking its place.

To deal with transportation needs, the legislature authorized counties to levy a special road tax to construct highways. Yavapai County received authorization to levy a special property tax of $0.50 per $100 assessed value to pay for the construction of a jail and other public buildings in Prescott.

The session passed a resolution honoring the accomplishments of the Arizona Volunteers, a ranger force organized to fight Apaches, stated the Volunteers "have inflicted greater punishment upon the Apache than all other troops in the Territory, besides ofttimes pursuing him barefoot and upon half-rations, to his fastnesses, cheerfully enduring the hardships encountered on mountain and desert." Memoranda sent to the U.S. Congress included requests for additional mail routes and a plea to repeal the law transferring most of Pah-Ute county to Nevada.

== Members ==
House of Representatives
Name	District	Name	District
Underwood C. Barnett	Yavapai	William S. Little	Yavapai
Oscar Buckalew	Pima	Michael McKenna	Pima
Solomon W. Chambers (Note: Did not attend session.)	Pima	William J. Osborn	Pima
Royal J. Cutler	Pah-Ute	Granville H. Oury (Speaker)	Pima
Alonzo E. Davis	Mohave	Robert F. Piatt	Yuma
Marcus D. Dobbins	Yuma	John B. Slack	Yavapai
James S. Douglas	Pima	Hannibal Sypert	Yavapai
Daniel Ellis	Yavapai	William H Thomas	Yuma
Thomas D. Hutton	Pima	Henry McC. Ward	Pima

Council
Name	District
Mark Aldrich (President)	Pima
Octavius D. Gass	Pah-Ute
William H. Hardy	Mohave
Henry Jenkins	Pima
Daniel S. Lount	Yavapai
Alexander McKey	Yuma
Mortimer R. Platt	Pima
John W. Simmons	Yavapai
Lewis A Stevens	Yavapai
