= 6th Arizona Territorial Legislature =

Session of the Arizona Territorial Legislature (1871)

←	5th	7th	→

Overview
- Legislative body: Arizona Territorial Legislature
- Jurisdiction: Arizona Territory, United States

Council
- Members: 9
- President: Daniel H. Stickney, Harley High Cartter

House of Representatives
- Members: 18
- Speaker: Marcus D. Dobbins

The 6th Arizona Territorial Legislative Assembly was a session of the Arizona Territorial Legislature which met in Tucson beginning on January 11, 1871, and ran until February 14, 1871.

== Background ==
Arizona Territory's sixth legislative session was initially scheduled to occur in 1869. Governor Richard C. McCormick had departed to become Arizona's Territorial Delegate to Congress following the previous session however and his replacement had not arrived in time to issue a call for elections. In the intervening time, the U.S. Congress had passed legislation calling for the legislature to meet every two years instead of the previous annual meetings. During the mean time, Anson P.K. Safford had become Governor of Arizona Territory.

The Indian Wars continued throughout Arizona Territory. Due to limited political influence and lack of telegraph and railroad service within the territory, there was little understanding of the situation on the East Coast of the United States. Unsatisfied with the situation, the territorial government was exerting what influence they possessed to have General George Stoneman (a future Governor of California) replaced as commander of the District of Arizona. Compounding the Indian issue was the presence of Mexican outlaws raiding the territory.

A lingering issue was the status of Pah-Ute County. Created by the 1865 session of the legislature, most of its land had been transferred to Nevada by the U.S. Congress on May 5, 1866. As a result the county was only a fragment of its original size and its status remained uncertain.

== Legislative session ==
The session convened on January 11, 1871. To address problems cause by Apache depredations during the preceding two years and special committee was formed to address the issue.

=== Governor's address ===
The Governor's address was given on January 14, 1871. He used the speech to label the Apache Wars as the territory's biggest concern, stating "the Apache Indians have never manifested the least disposition to live on terms of peace, until after they have been thoroughly subjugated by military power"

The second issue facing the territory was a lack of public schools. While there was a catholic school for girls in Tucson and a private school in Prescott, there were no public schools for the nearly 2,000 children residing in Arizona Territory.

=== Legislation ===
The result of the special committee on the Apache issue was creation of a memorial to Congress containing statements from leading citizens and Army officers detailing the situation and requesting additional military presence. Typical of the included testimony was a statement from Governor Stafford reading, "during the year 1870 the Apache Indians have been and are now in more active hostility than at any time since the Territory has been under the American Flag."

To address the Governor's call to establish a public education system, a territorial property tax of US$0.10 per $100 assessed value was established to create a general education fund. The act also authorized the Board of Supervisors in each county to assess property tax of up to US$0.50 per $100 assessed value to finance operation of public schools.

A proposal to create a Pinal County made in response to appeals by residents of Pima and Yavapai counties was twice defeated in the House of Representatives by a vote of 7–8. A bill introduced later in the session succeeded in creating Maricopa County from a portion of southern Yavapai County west of the San Carlos River. The act which created Pah-Ute County was repealed returning the remains of the county to Mohave County. Additionally, the seat of Yuma County was moved from La Paz to Arizona City.

== Members ==
House of Representatives
Name	District	Name	District
John Anderson	Pima	Joseph Melvin	Yavapai
Thomas J. Bidwell	Yuma	James L. Mercer	Yavapai
C. H. Brinley	Yuma	William Morgan	Pima
Marcus D. Dobbins (Speaker)	Yuma	William J. O'Neill	Yavapai
Juan Elías	Pima	Ramón Romano	Pima
J. H. Fitzgerald	Yavapai	Rees Smith	Pima
W. L. Fowler	Pima	John L. Taylor	Yavapai
F. H. Goodwin	Pima	G. A. Wilson	Yavapai

Council
Name	District
John T. Alsap	Yavapai
Harley High Cartter (President) (Note: Became President following death of Stickney.)	Yavapai
Francisco S. Léon	Pima
Andrew J. Marmaduke	Yavapai
Estevan Ochoa	Pima
John H. Phillips	Yuma
Hiram S. Stevens	Pima
Daniel H. Stickney (President) (Note: Died during legislative session.)	Pima

Neither Mohave nor Pah-Ute counties were represented at this session.
