= John T. Alsap =

American physician, politician, and farmer (1830–1886)

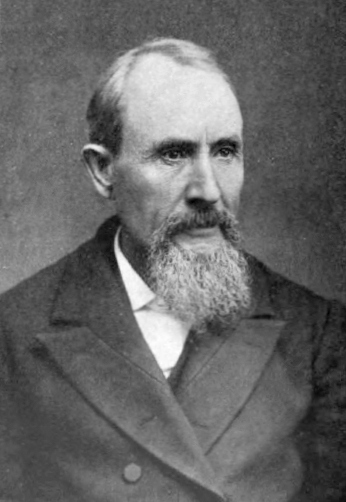

1st Mayor of Phoenix
- In office 1881–1881
- Preceded by: Position established
- Succeeded by: Francis A. Shaw

Personal details
- Born: John Tabor Alsap; February 23, 1830 Frankfort, Kentucky, U.S.
- Died: September 10, 1886 (aged 56) Phoenix, Arizona, U.S.
- Spouse: Louisa A. Osborn

John Tabor Alsap (February 26 or 28, 1830 (Note: Some sources list Alsap's year of birth as 1832.) – September 10, 1886) was an American medical doctor, lawyer, politician, and farmer active in the early days of Arizona Territory. Among his accomplishments are being appointed the first Treasurer of Arizona Territory, being elected to four terms of the territorial legislature, serving as both Speaker of the House and President of the Council in the Arizona Territorial legislature, and becoming the first Mayor of Phoenix.

== Biography ==
Alsap was born in Frankfort, Kentucky on either February 26 or 28 in 1830. His family moved to Ohio when he was two years old before settling in Fort Wayne, Indiana when he was ten. Alsap is commonly credited with graduating in 1854 from the New York College of Medicine with degrees in law and medicine. There is evidence, however, that he gained his medical knowledge studying under a medical doctor in Marion, Ohio instead of from his university studies.

After completing his studies, Alsap worked briefly as a medical doctor in Indiana before moving to Contra Costa County, California. In California he augmented his work as a medical doctor with farming and prospecting.

In 1863, Alsap began prospecting in the area which would soon become Arizona Territory. He joined King Woolsey's second foray against the Apache from March 29 – April 17, 1864, serving as the group's surgeon. With the founding of Prescott, Alsap become operator and co-owner of the town's first saloon. He was appointed the territory's first treasurer by Governor John Noble Goodwin, a position he held until 1867. His other business activities include joining with Richard Cunningham McCormick, Woolsey, and others to form a corporation to build the first road between Prescott and southern Arizona.

Alsap married Louisa A. Osborn, the daughter of another Prescott pioneer, on June 6, 1866. Two years later he was elected to represent Yavapai County in the 5th Arizona Territorial Legislature. During the session he was selected to serve as President of the council.

In 1869, Alsap joined his brother-in-law, W. L. Osborn, and began farming in the Salt River valley. There he help found the Phoenix Ditch Company for the purpose of building irrigation canals in the valley. On October 24, 1870, Alsap was elected one of three commissioners for the Salt River Valley Association, which oversaw creation of the town of Phoenix.

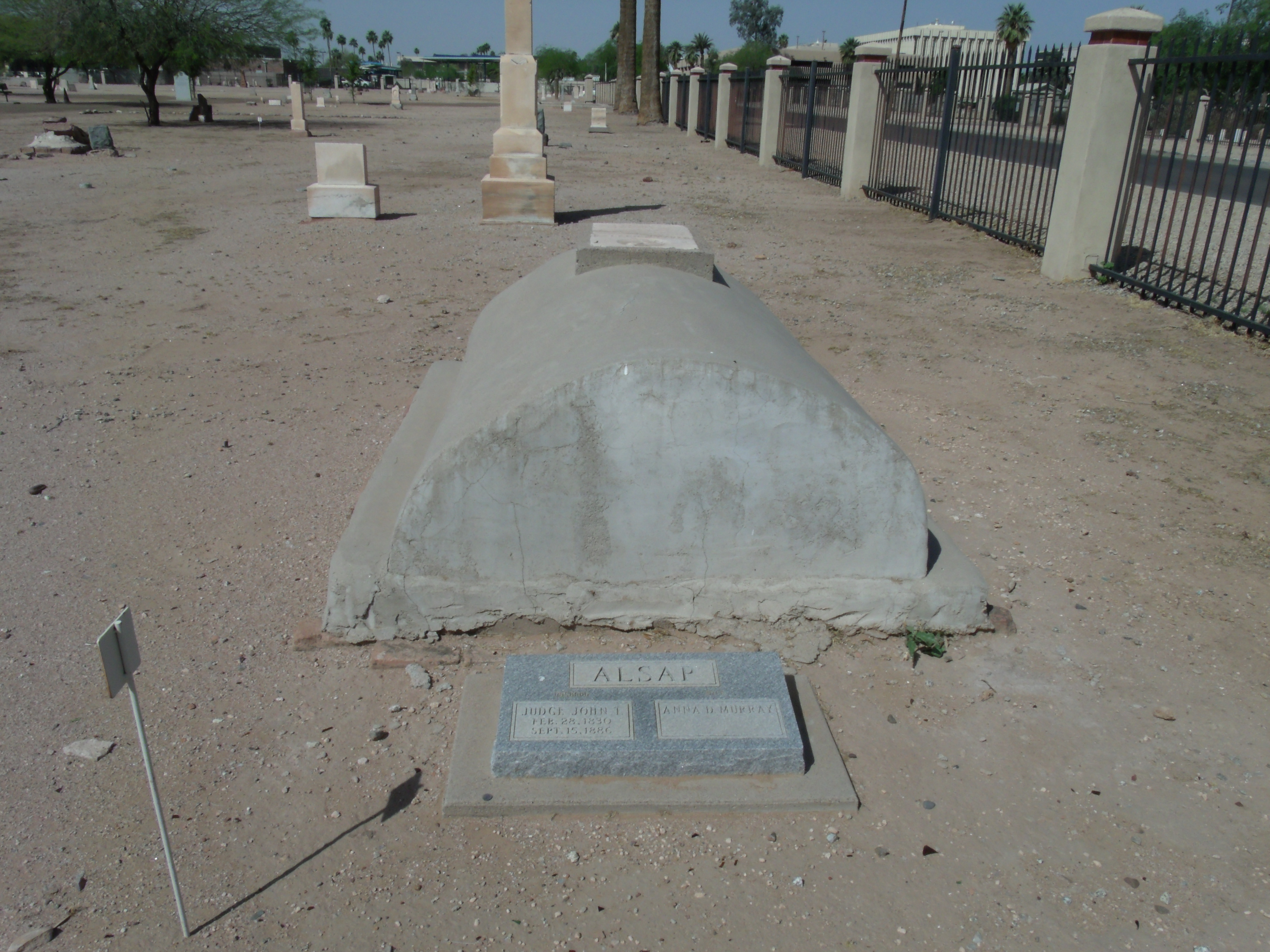
Grave site of John T. Alsap

The 6th Arizona Territorial Legislature, in 1871, saw Alsap represent Yavapai County in the council for the second time. During the session he served on a committee to deal with the so-called "Apache problem". His primary accomplishment however was leading the effort to create Maricopa County from southern Yavapai County. Governor Anson P.K. Safford appointed Alsap the newly created county's Probate judge on February 21, 1871. Alsap was admitted to the bar in 1872 and practiced law for several years.

As Probate judge, Alsap was responsible for a variety of other activities. These included resolving title issues in the newly created town of Phoenix, performed weddings, and serving as ex officio superintendent of the county schools. At the completion of his first term, Alsap was appointed to a second on February 15, 1873. Following the death of his first wife, Alsap married Anna D. Murray.

Alsap represented Maricopa County during the 8th Arizona Territorial Legislature in 1875. He also served as the session's Speaker in the House of Representatives. The next year he was a board member for Arizona's presentation at the Centennial Exposition. Judge Alsap was elected to represent Maricopa County again during the 1879 session of the territorial legislature. When Phoenix was incorporated in 1881, Alsap was elected the city's first Mayor.

Alsap was active in Freemasonry, the Odd Fellows, and the Knights of Pythias. He was also a member of the Methodist Church. Alsap died in Phoenix on September 10, 1886. He is buried in Phoenix's Pioneer and Military Memorial Park.

== See also ==
- History of Phoenix, Arizona
- Alsap Butte
