= 2nd Arizona Territorial Legislature =

Session of the Arizona Territorial Legislature (1865)

←	1st	3rd	→

Overview
- Legislative body: Arizona Territorial Legislature
- Jurisdiction: Arizona Territory, United States

Council
- Members: 9
- President: Henry A. Bigelow

House of Representatives
- Members: 18
- Speaker: James S. Giles

The 2nd Arizona Territorial Legislative Assembly was a session of the Arizona Territorial Legislature which began on December 6, 1865, in Prescott, Arizona, and ran for 24 days. The sessions chief accomplishments were creation of Pah-Ute County and establishing Arizona as a community property jurisdiction.

== Background ==
At the time the 2nd legislature met, Arizona Territory was only two years old and still in the process of setting up basic government services. The American Civil War was still in progress and military troops to deal with Apache and other tribes hostile to white settlement was limited. Establishment of the Colorado River Indian Reservation had however greatly reduced conflict with the Mohave.

Mail service was a major concern in the territory. As Territorial Secretary Richard C. McCormick stated, "The hostile Indian is scarcely more inimical to the progress and prosperity of a new country than the mail contractor who by his faithlessness interrupts the business and social intercourse of the people, and deprives them of their only means of communication with the outer world." The previous year had seen the establishment of the territory's first mail route, connecting Prescott with Los Angeles, California, Santa Fe, New Mexico Territory, and Tubac. To this route McCormick wished to see restoration of the old Butterfield route along with a new route serving settlers along the Colorado River.

The period since the previous legislative session had also seen the territory's second elections held in September 1865. During the elections, Governor John N. Goodwin had defeated Charles D. Poston for Delegate to the U.S. House of Representatives. As a result, Secretary McCormick was left as Acting Governor.

== Legislative session ==
The twenty-four-day-long session of the Second Legislative Assembly convened in Prescott on December 6, 1865.

=== Governor's address ===
The Governor's address was given by Acting Governor Richard C. McCormick on December 11, 1865. During the address he called for general legislation, as opposed to special enactments, to clear up legal problems dealing with mine ownership within the territory. Other issues involved creation of jails to hold law breakers and encouraging agriculture by settlers and "tame Indians" to provide food to the territory's population.

=== Legislation ===
The first act of the session was the creation of Pah-Ute County from the northern part of Mohave County. Upon the recommendation of Acting Governor McCormick, the county was created to serve the needs of a rapidly growing population of farmers along the Colorado River. The county seat was initially located in Callville but later moved to the town of St. Thomas. On May 5, 1866, the United States Congress gave most of the new county's territory to the State of Nevada.

Two changes to marriage laws made. First established Arizona as a community property jurisdiction. The second prohibited marriage of a white person to an Indian, Mongoloid, Mulatto, or Negro. This anti-miscegenation law remained on the books for nearly 100 years before being eliminated in the midst of a court case involving a person of Japanese descent marrying a white person.

Other legislation passed included two new taxes. The first an ad valorem tax of US$0.25 per $100 of assessed value passed, the second a poll tax of $3.00 for everyone except Indians, Mongoloids, and Negros. Three member Board of Supervisors were authorized to oversee affairs in each county. Finally, December 4, 1865, was set for the opening date of the first session of the territorial supreme court.

In addition to the legislation, a concurrent resolution expressing sorrow over the death of Abraham Lincoln was passed.

== Members ==
House of Representatives
Name	District	Name	District
Simon Chambers (Note: Did not attend session.)	Pima	Alexander McKey	Yuma
Peter Doll	Yuma	William J. Osborn	Pima
Juan Elias	Pima	M. R. Platt	Pima
Daniel Ellis	Yavapai	James O. Robertson	Yavapai
Octavius D. Gass	Mohave	Converse W. C. Rowell	Mohave
James S. Giles (Speaker)	Yavapai	Manual Smith	Pima
William K. Heninger	Yuma	Daniel H. Stickney	Pima
Samuel C. Hughes	Pima	John W. Sweeney	Pima
Jackson McCrackin	Yavapai	Henry McC. Ward	Pima

Council
Name	District
Coles Bashford	Pima
Henry A. Bigelow (President)	Yavapai
Patrick H. Dunne	Pima
Robert W. Groom	Yavapai
William H. Hardy	Mohave
Francisco S. León	Pima
George W. Pierce (Note: Elected but resigned before the session began.)	Pima
Manuel Ravena	Yuma
King S. Woolsey	Yavapai
