= Goodwin, Arizona =

Populated place in Yavapai County, Arizona

- Populated Place
- Location within the state of Arizona Goodwin (the United States)
- Coordinates: 34°21′21″N 112°22′48″W
- Country: United States
- State: Arizona
- County: Yavapai
- Elevation: 5,660 ft (1,730 m)
- Time zone: UTC-7 (Mountain (MST))
- Area code: 928
- FIPS code: 04-28330
- GNIS feature ID: 29416

Goodwin is a populated place situated in Yavapai County, Arizona, United States.

== See also ==
- John N. Goodwin – First Territorial Governor of Arizona and namesake of the community
