= Navajo Springs, Arizona =

Settlement in Apache County, Arizona, US

Coordinates: 35.1008433°N 109.4961472°W

Navajo Springs is an unincorporated community located on the Navajo Nation, near Holbrook, Arizona. The community is almost exclusively Native American, and a permit is required from the Navajo Nation for off-road travel in that area. During the time of the Old West, this area was frequented by notable western characters, such as Commodore Perry Owens. Navajo Springs was a stopping place for travelers to water their horses and themselves. The Beale Wagon Road, a precursor of the transcontinental railroad built through the area in 1882 as well as the "mother road", U.S. Route 66, (now Interstate 40) ran through Navajo Springs. The Arizona territorial government was organized here, and later a monument at the springs was erected to commemorate the event. At the insistence of the Santa Fe Railway company, all Navajos were forcibly moved away from the Navajo Springs area, and by the 1930s, all allotted lands within the area were extinguished and the lands forcibly vacated. But by the late 1980s, the lands were once again occupied by Navajos, this time by Navajo "refugees" from the Navajo-Hopi land dispute.

== History ==
Navajo Springs was first noted by white men when Lt. Amiel W. Whipple passed through in 1853 and observed a "fine pool of water which breaks through the surface of the valley". Later, on September 1, 1857, Lt. Edward Fitzgerald Beale found Whipple's trail while scouting for a wagon road to be used by emigrants. At this point, Navajo Springs began to develop as a rest stop for travelers heading further west. In 1863, it was designated an official route by Major G. B. Willis. On December 27, 1863, the first gubernatorial party for Arizona crossed from New Mexico to Arizona. However, as they were unsure as to where the border between the states was, they proceeded to Navajo Springs, where on the 29th the first territorial governor of Arizona, John Noble Goodwin, was sworn in by Richard Cunningham McCormick, the first secretary of the territory and Goodwin's eventual successor.
