= Jose Maria Redondo =

Mexican-American entrepreneur and politician (1830–1878)

Jose Maria Redondo (March 9, 1830 – June 18, 1878) was a Mexican-American entrepreneur, member of the Arizona Territorial Legislature, and mayor of Yuma, Arizona. Jose Maria Redondo is known as the father of the Yuma Territorial Prison. He also changed the name of Arizona City to Yuma and became wealthy from mining and irrigation in Arizona.

== Biography ==
Redondo was born into an upper-class ranching family near Altar, Sonora. He left with his father and uncle at nineteen years old to mine for gold in Southern Arizona and California. In California, he met Piedad Contreras, who was from a prominent Sonoran family. They married on June 13, 1853.

In 1859, after a decade overseeing successful mining ventures, Redondo led his family and the Contreras family Southern Arizona. Redondo purchased land for an experimental farm, the San Ysidro Ranch in La Laguna, near Colorado City. The ranch grew uncommon and common crops, and was the first grower of Colorado River Lettuce, as well as some other crops. He was also the first in Yuma to use industrial ice-making technology to keep produce fresh during rail travel. The ranch had an extensive irrigation system, giving Redondo the name of "The Father of Irrigation in Yuma." During this time, Redondo continued to search for gold. He also owned several businesses in-town and operated a ferry across the Colorado River. The location of the ferry varies across accounts.

In 1860, the Redondos briefly moved to Gila City, Arizona, where they had a son die in infancy. Redondo biographer Mulford Winsor notes that Redondo, in response to his wife's reluctance to bury their son in "a place so desolate," had him embalmed and brought to Altar for burial.

In 1862, Redondo was involved in the discovery of gold in La Paz County, Arizona and managed diggings in the area.

In 1864, when Arizona became a United States territory, Redondo was selected to represent Yuma in the First Territorial Legislature. However, he was declared ineligible because he was not a U.S. citizen, although one account claims that records of his naturalization in California had been destroyed.

In 1866, Redondo relocated to Yuma, where he managed his businesses and continued selling produce.

By 1873, after his citizenship had been confirmed, he was re-elected to the Territorial Legislature. He served in the seventh, eighth, and ninth Legislatures, and during the eighth and ninth sessions he was a member of the Legislature’s upper chamber, the Council. Redondo was responsible for changing the name of Colorado City to Yuma. He also arranged for the Territorial Prison to be built there.

In 1878, Redondo was elected mayor of Yuma. Shortly after his election, there was a Smallpox outbreak in the town. Redondo sent his family to California to avoid the disease, but stayed in Yuma himself to perform his mayoral duties. He died of smallpox on June 18, 1878.
