= Mark Aldrich =

American politician (1802–1873)

- Mark Aldrich

Mayor of Tucson, Arizona
- In office 1861

Personal details
- Born: January 22, 1802 Warren County, New York, US
- Died: September 21, 1873 (aged 71) Tucson, Arizona, US
- Resting place: Tucson, Arizona
- Party: Whig
- Spouse: Teofila Trinidad Leon Aldrich

Mark Aldrich (January 22, 1802 – September 21, 1873) was a founder of Warsaw, Illinois, and a politician: Illinois state senator for the Whig Party, the first American mayor of Tucson, Arizona, and a three-term territorial senator in Arizona. He was one of five defendants tried and acquitted in Illinois of the murder in 1844 of Joseph Smith, who was the founder of the Latter Day Saint movement.

== Founding of Warsaw and political leadership ==
Aldrich was born in New York and moved to Hancock County, Illinois, in 1832, where he was one of the early developers of what would later become the town of Warsaw. Aldrich was appointed as the first postmaster of Warsaw, serving between 1834 and 1838. In 1836 and 1838 he was elected to the Illinois Senate as the representative for Hancock County.

== Early involvement with the Latter Day Saints ==
In the late 1830s, Latter Day Saints began settling in Hancock County. According to Latter Day Saint leader Joseph Smith, Aldrich spent two years trying to convince Smith and the Latter Day Saints to purchase a section of land south of Warsaw which Aldrich owned.

In 1841, Smith finally relented and some of the Latter Day Saints settled as Aldrich's tenants in what would be called Warren, Illinois. However, once the Latter Day Saints had settled there, Aldrich raised the rent and imposed a number of restrictions on the Latter Day Saints that had not been foreseen. As a result, Smith moved the Latter Day Saints settled in Warren to Nauvoo, where the majority of Latter Day Saints had settled.

Aldrich was unsuccessful in his attempts to persuade Smith to continue their arrangement. As a result, Aldrich filed for bankruptcy on March 22, 1842.

== Murder trial ==
Following his disagreements with Smith, Aldrich became an opponent of the Latter Day Saint presence in Hancock County. He was a major in command of the Warsaw Independent Battalion of the Illinois State Militia.

Aldrich was later accused of having directed men under his command to storm Carthage Jail where Smith and his brother were being held in June 1844. Smith and his brother Hyrum were shot dead by a mob that attacked the jail on June 27. On October 26, 1844, Aldrich was indicted for the murder of the two Smiths. At trial, Aldrich and four other defendants were acquitted of the crime by a jury.

== Later life ==
Aldrich ran for sheriff of Hancock County in 1846, but lost. He went to California during the gold rush and settled later in Tucson, Arizona. He was elected as the first American mayor of that city, following the US acquisition of the Southwest following the Mexican–American War in 1848.

In March 1861, Aldrich was chairman of the convention that declared Arizona's secession from the United States at the start of the American Civil War. Aldrich was later elected to three terms in the upper house of the Arizona Territorial Legislature; during the 1866 term, he was the body's president. He died in Tucson on September 21, 1873.

Two different streets in San Francisco were named for him: Aldrich Alley (subsequently renamed) and Mark Lane.
