= Pah-Ute County, Arizona Territory =

Former county in the Arizona Territory (1865–1871)

Coordinates: 36.46°N 115.09°W

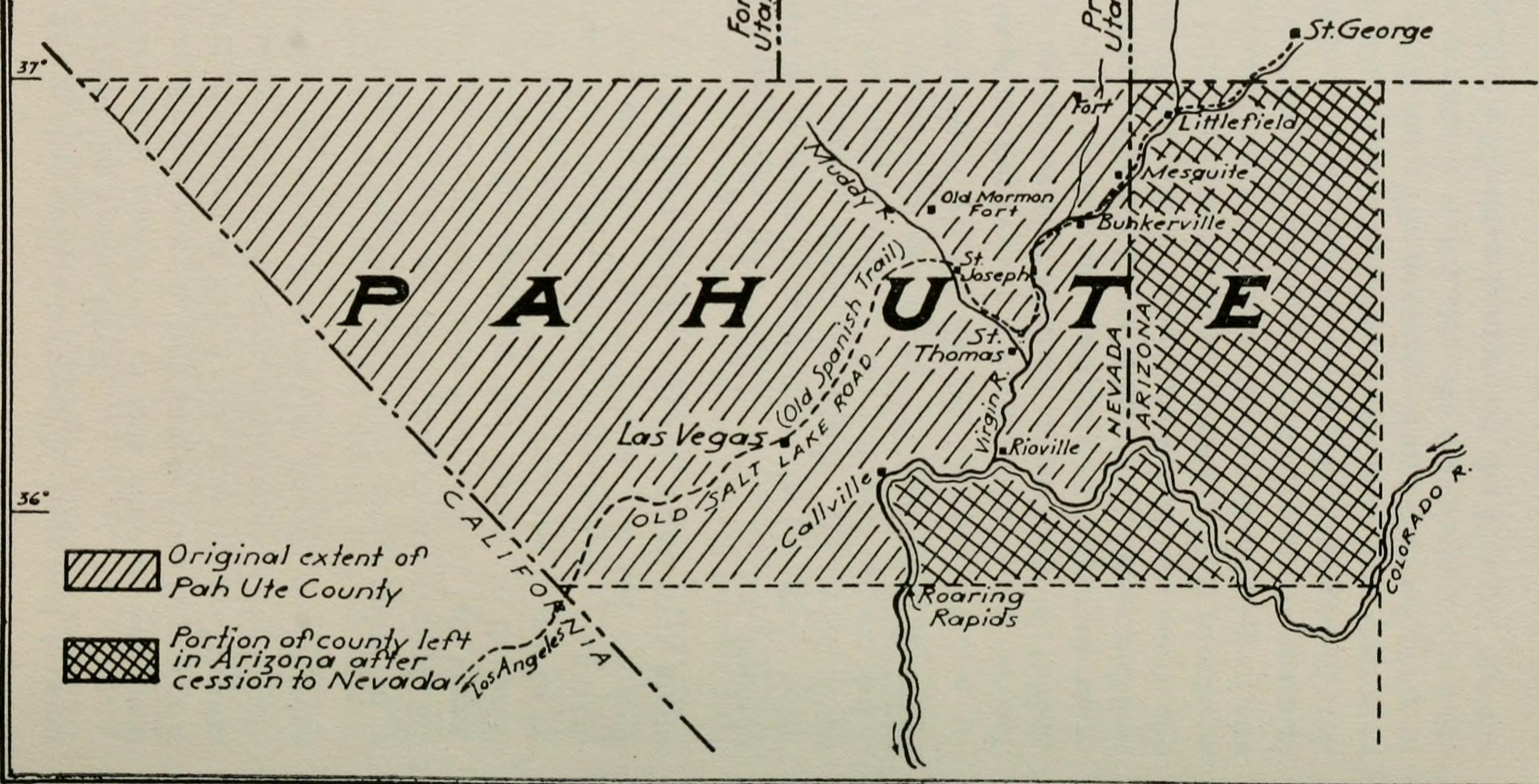
Map showing Pah-Ute County as it is now divided between Nevada and Arizona

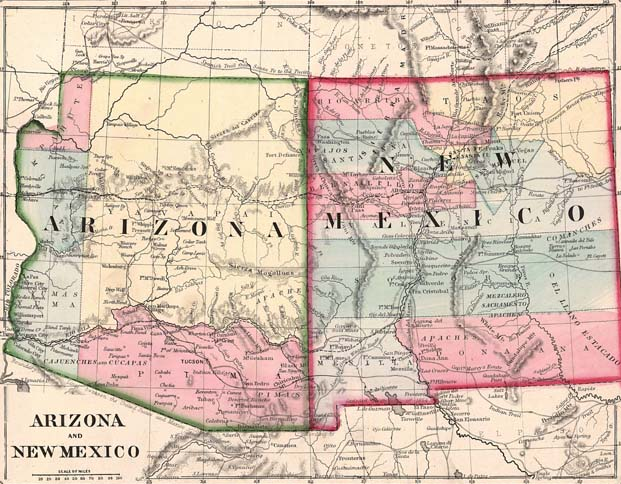
1867 map of the Arizona and New Mexico Territories, showing the remnant of Pah-Ute county (pink area top left)

Pah-Ute County is a former county in the northwest corner of Arizona Territory that existed from 1865 until 1871, at which point most of the area was transferred to Nevada. The remainder was merged into Mohave County. The majority of the territory is now in Clark County, Nevada, which includes the city of Las Vegas.

== Etymology ==
Pah-Ute is a historic spelling of the tribal name Paiute.

== History ==
Pah-Ute county was created on December 22, 1865, by an act of the 2nd Arizona Territorial Legislature from the northern part of Mohave County following the sponsorship of Representative Octavius Gass. Created to meet the needs of a rapidly growing population of farmers along the Colorado River, the county seat was initially Callville. The county seat was moved to the Mormon community of St. Thomas on October 1, 1867. (Both communities are now located at the bottom of Lake Mead.) Initial boundaries of the county were those parts of Arizona Territory north of the Roaring Rapids on the Colorado River and west of 113° 20” west longitude.

On May 5, 1866, the United States Congress approved legislation transferring the portions of Pah-Ute and Mohave counties west of the Colorado River and west of 114 degrees west longitude to the state of Nevada. The assignment took effect on January 18, 1867. The Arizona Territory lodged multiple protests with Congress and attempted for several years to have the transfer reversed, but was unable to overturn the change of possession. During this time, Pah-Ute county continued to have representation in the Arizona Territorial Legislature through 1868. Official dissolution of Pah-Ute county occurred on February 18, 1871, when the 6th Arizona Territorial Legislature rescinded the act that created the county and restored the remaining portion to Mohave County.

== Aftermath ==
While the federal government acknowledged Nevada's ownership of the portion of Pah-Ute County that was transferred to them, Nevada's constitution was never formally amended to include the new territory for over a century.

The legal ambiguity existed because the state's constitution initially delineated its southern border at 36th parallel north, and no efforts were made to change that despite calls by former governor Henry G. Blasdel to do so in 1867.

In at least two separate instances, lawyers representing murder convicts attempted to argue that Las Vegas does not legally belong to Nevada in attempts to get their clients released from prison.

In 1982, voters in Nevada approved Question 5, which corrected the constitutional ambiguity.

== Legacy ==
Due to the land transfer to Nevada that ultimately led to the county's dissolution, Pah-Ute County is sometimes referred to as Arizona's "Lost County".

== See also ==
- List of former United States counties
- List of counties in Arizona
