= John N. Goodwin =

American politician (1824–1887)

John Noble Goodwin
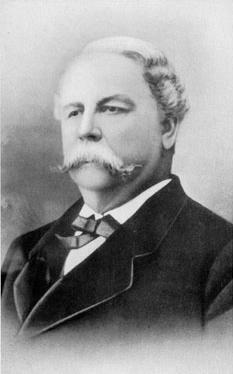

1st Governor of Arizona Territory
- In office December 29, 1863 – April 10, 1866
- Nominated by: Abraham Lincoln
- Succeeded by: Richard C. McCormick

Member of the U.S. House of Representatives from Maine's 1st district
- In office March 4, 1861 – March 3, 1863
- Preceded by: Daniel E. Somes
- Succeeded by: Lorenzo De Medici Sweat

Delegate to the U.S. House of Representatives from Arizona Territory
- In office January 17, 1866 – March 3, 1867
- Preceded by: Charles Debrille Poston
- Succeeded by: Coles Bashford

Member of the Maine Senate
- In office 1854

Personal details
- Born: October 18, 1824 South Berwick, Maine, U.S.
- Died: April 29, 1887 (aged 62) Paraiso Springs, Monterey County, California, U.S.
- Party: Republican
- Spouse: Susan Howard Robinson
- Profession: Attorney

John Noble Goodwin (October 18, 1824 – April 29, 1887) was an American attorney and politician who served as the first governor of Arizona Territory from 1863 to 1866. He was also a congressman from Maine from 1861 to 1863, and a delegate to the United States House of Representatives from Arizona Territory from 1866 to 1867.

== Background ==
Goodwin was born on October 18, 1824, in South Berwick, Maine, to John and Mary (Noble) Goodwin. He was educated at Berwick Academy and graduated from Dartmouth College in 1844. Following graduation, Goodwin studied law and was admitted to the bar in 1848. He then began a law practice in South Berwick. Goodwin married Susan Howard Robinson of Augusta, Maine, on October 27, 1857. The couple had three children, Susie Robinson, Richard Emery, and Howard Robinson, the youngest born on November 7, 1863.

== Maine ==
Goodwin began his political career in 1854 with his election to the Maine Senate. This was followed in 1860 with a successful run for the U.S. House of Representatives. Though considered hard-working and likable with a moderate approach, Goodwin's single term as a Congressman was described as "undistinguished". He was defeated by 127 votes in his 1862 reelection bid.

Following his defeat, Goodwin began looking for another federal posting. He was supported in the effort by U.S. Senators William P. Fessenden and Lot M. Morrill, both of Maine, along with several former colleagues from the House of Representatives. On March 6, 1863, following passage of the Arizona Organic Act, President Lincoln appointed Goodwin as Chief Justice of Arizona Territory. When John A. Gurley, Lincoln's initial appointee for Governor of Arizona Territory, died on August 19, 1863, Goodwin was selected to fill the open position.

== Governorship ==
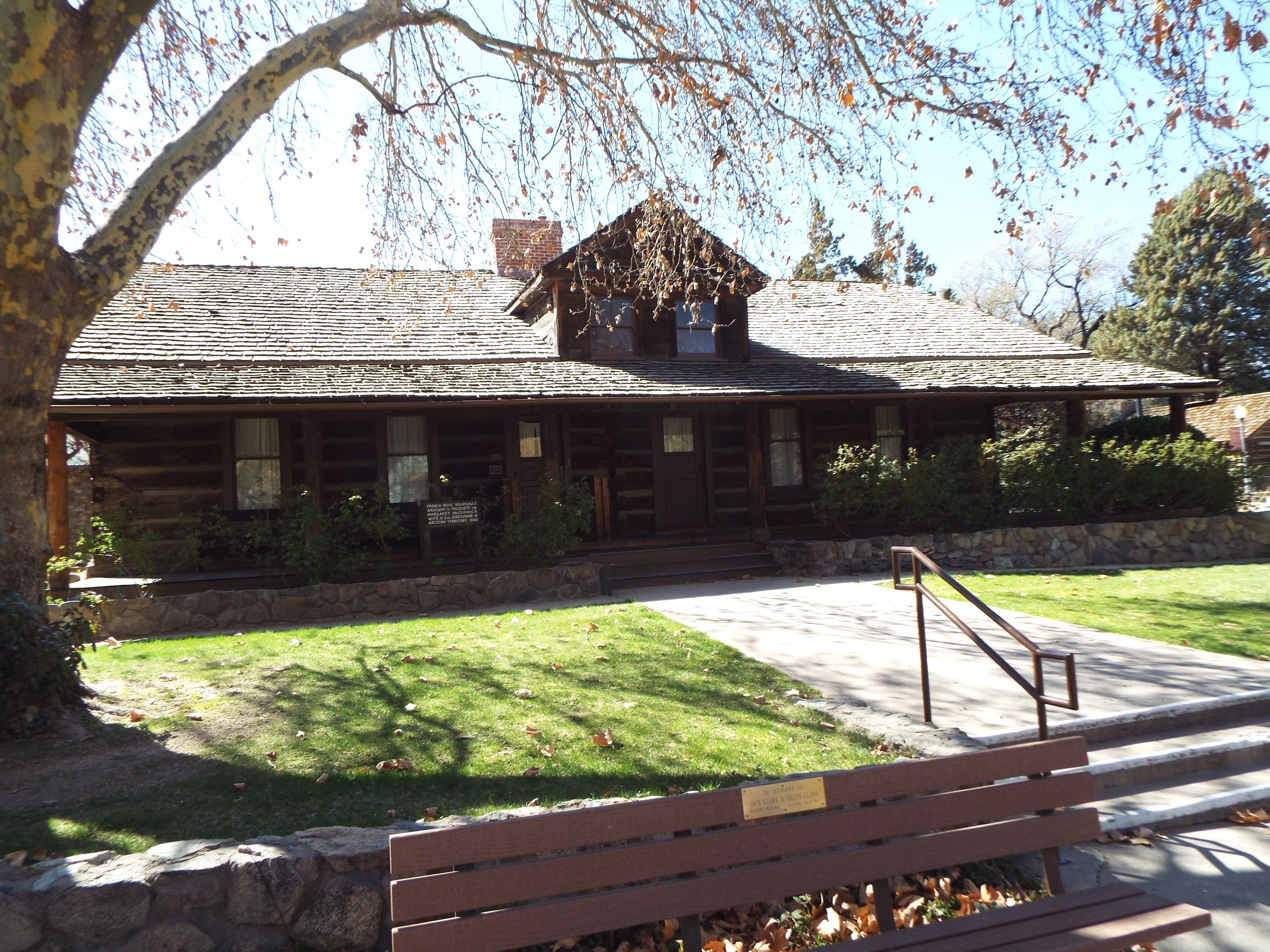
The Goodwin Governor's House known as the Old Governor's Mansion

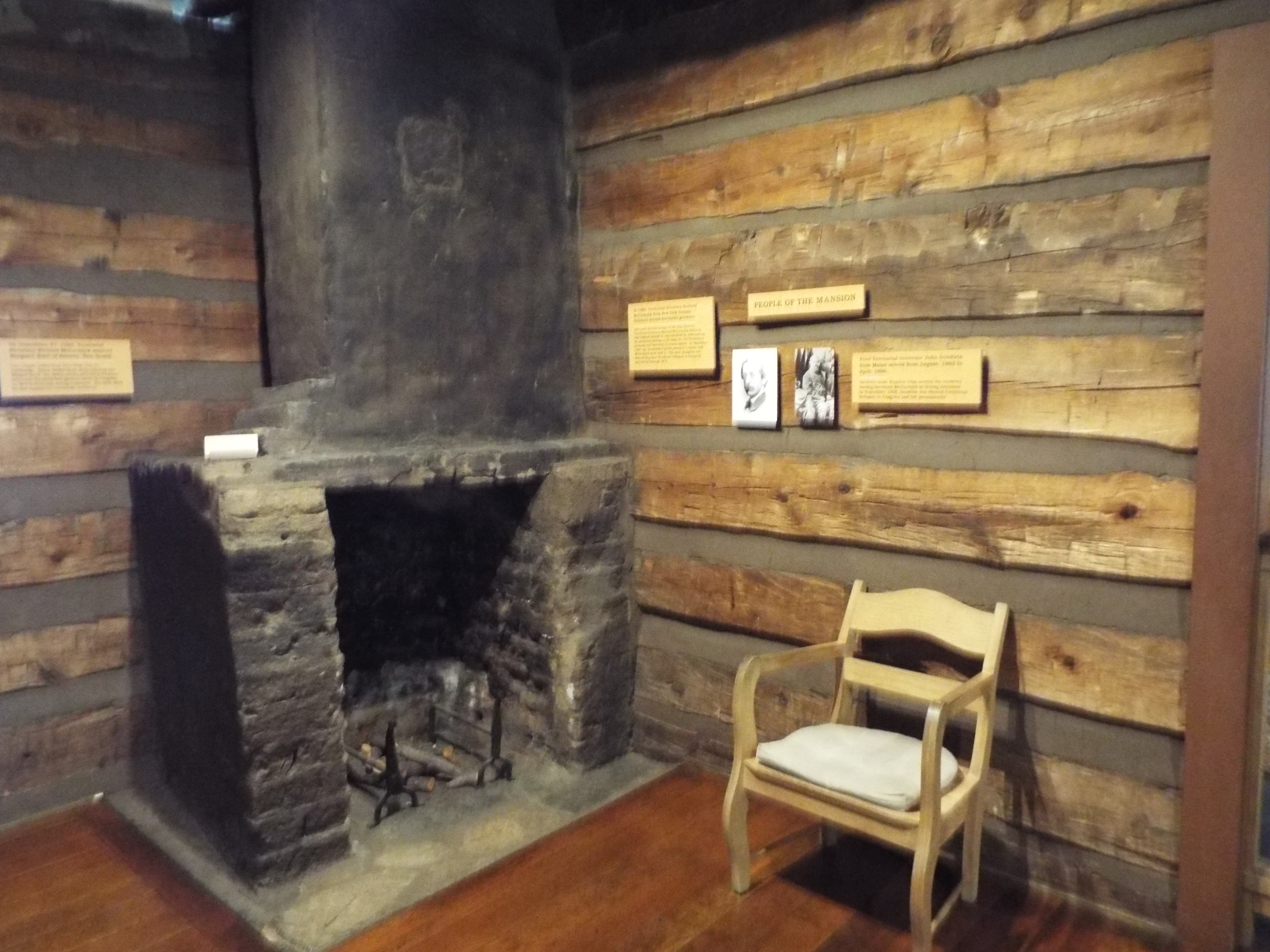
Inside the "Old Governor's Mansion"

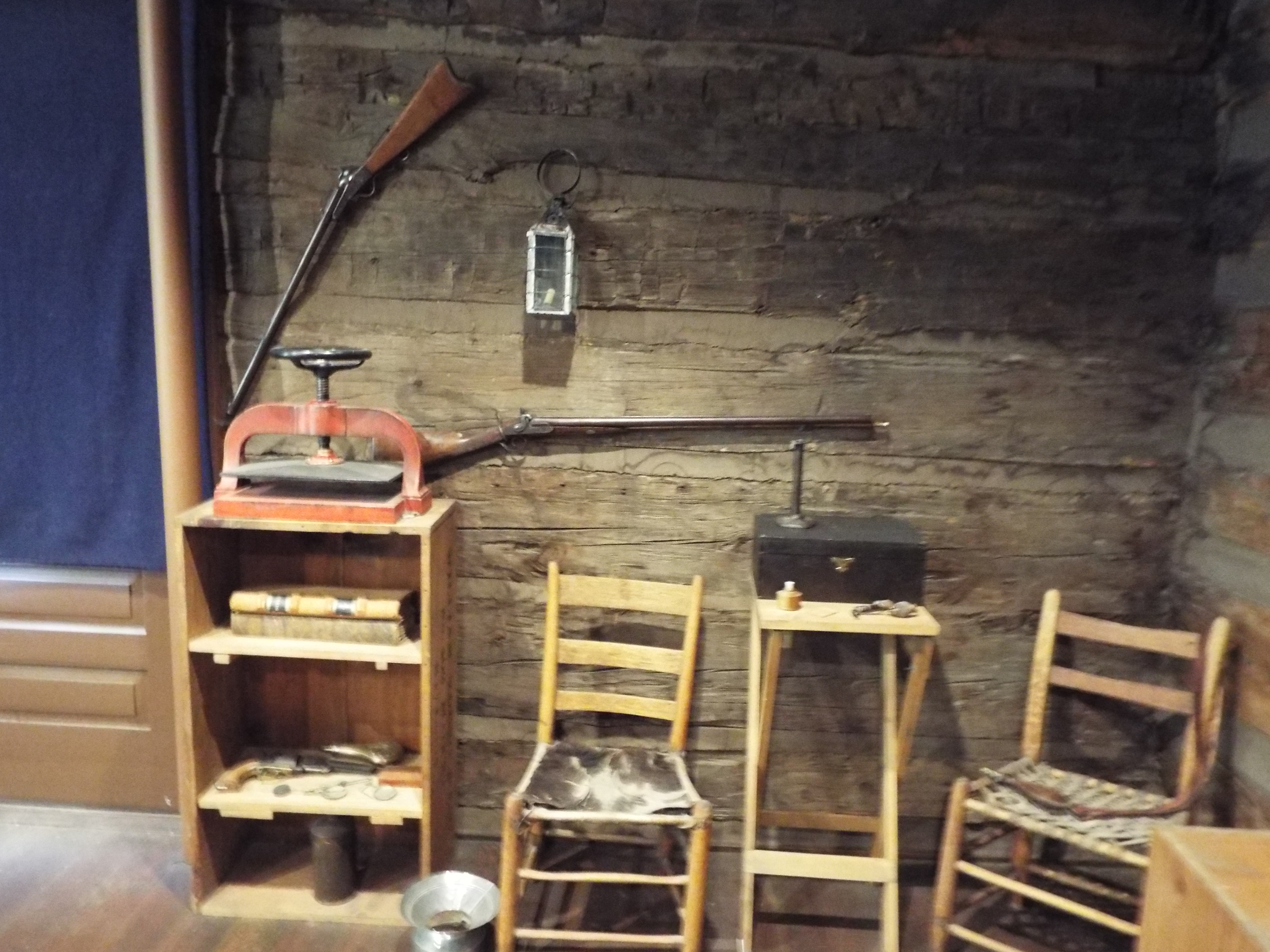
Inside another room of the "Old Governor's Mansion"

The Governor's party, consisting of most of Arizona's appointed officials, left Washington, D.C., for Fort Leavenworth. They then took the Santa Fe Trail, arriving in Santa Fe, New Mexico, on November 26, 1863. The party then crossed into Arizona, and on December 29, 1863, held a ceremony at Navajo Springs to formally establish the Arizona Territory and administer oaths of office to the territorial officials.

As Congress had not specified the location of the territorial capital, it fell to Goodwin to select an initial location. Tucson as the largest settlement in the territory had been considered a likely location, but based upon the recommendation of General James H. Carleton who viewed Tucson as full of Mexicans and Confederate sympathizers, Fort Whipple was instead selected. The governor and his party reached Fort Whipple on January 22, 1864.

Shortly after establishing the temporary capital, Goodwin set out with a military escort on a tour of the new territory. The purpose of the tour was to familiarize the governor with his new territory and to search for suitable locations for a more permanent capital. The mining district near Fort Whipple was seen first, followed by the areas around the Verde and Salinas rivers. In April and May, he was in southern Arizona. Following this tour, Goodwin decided to place the new capital at a site near Granite Creek, roughly 20 miles south of Fort Whipple's location. The military camp was moved and on May 30, 1864, the new capital was named Prescott at a public meeting.

Goodwin's duties encompassed dividing the territory into judicial districts and appointing a variety of officials to conduct governmental tasks. Following an initial census overseen by U.S. Marshal Milton B. Duffield, the governor proclaimed an election for the selection of a territorial legislature and delegate to Congress would occur on July 18, 1864. When the 1st Arizona Territorial Legislature convened, Goodwin called for immediate removal of peonage and imprisonment for debt from the set of laws Arizona had inherited from New Mexico Territory along with creation of a commission to create a new legal code for Arizona. The governor also asked the legislature to minimize the number of appointed officials, combining multiple part-time positions into a single full-time position where practicable. Other topics Goodwin raised with the legislature were taxation and location of the territorial capital.

To deal with the Apache and other tribes, Goodwin called for assistance from the U.S. Army along with creation of a volunteer force to combat the hostiles. A force of 350 men and 11 officers was raised and divided into five companies. For peaceful tribes, the governor called for Congress to create reservations along the Colorado River and appropriate funds to build irrigation systems.

Other efforts Goodwin pursued were establishment of postal routes and creation of schools.

== Territorial delegate ==
Goodwin was elected to be Arizona Territory's delegate to the 39th United States Congress on September 6, 1865, defeating incumbent Charles D. Poston in the process. Soon after, Goodwin left for Washington D. C. leaving Richard C. McCormick behind as acting governor. The new delegate did not reach the floor of Congress till January 17, 1866. During the period lasting until McCormick's appointment as governor, Goodwin collected two salaries and did not respond to requests for return of the overpayment for the U.S. Treasury Department.

During his time as a delegate, Goodwin submitted several bills calling for troops to fight hostile Indians, creation of additional postal routes. He also spoke out against the transfer of Pah-Ute County from Arizona Territory to Nevada. Goodwin did not seek re-election in 1866.

== Later life ==
Following his time as territorial Delegate, Goodwin moved to New York City to be closer to his business interests. He served as vice-president of the Tiger Mill and Mining Company of New York by the early 1880s. Goodwin died on April 29, 1887, at Paraiso Springs in Monterey County, California, where he had gone for health reasons. He was buried in Forest Grove Cemetery in Augusta, Maine.

== See also ==
- Goodwin, Arizona – a community in Yavapai County, Arizona

U.S. House of Representatives
Preceded by Daniel E. Somes	Member of the U.S. House of Representatives from Maine's 1st congressional district 1861–1863	Succeeded by Lorenzo De Medici Sweat
Preceded by Charles Debrille Poston	Delegate to the U.S. House of Representatives from Arizona Territory; 1865–1867	Succeeded by Coles Bashford
Political offices
Preceded by none	Governor of Arizona Territory; 1863–1866	Succeeded by Richard C. McCormick
