= Arizona Organic Act =

Federal law creating the Arizona Territory

The Arizona Organic Act was an organic act passed in the United States federal law introduced as H.R. 357 in the second session of the 37th U.S. Congress on March 12, 1862, by Rep. James M. Ashley of Ohio. The Act provided for the creation of the Arizona Territory by the division of the New Mexico Territory into two territories along the current boundary between New Mexico and Arizona. On February 24, 1863, President Abraham Lincoln signed the bill once Congress removed it. The bill established a provisional government for the new territory. It abolished slavery in the new Arizona Territory, but did not abolish it in the portion that remained the New Mexico Territory. During the 1850s, Congress had resisted a demand for Arizona statehood because of a well-grounded fear that it would become a slave state.

According to Marshall Trimble, the official historian of Arizona, the Arizona Organic Act can be traced to the Northwest Ordinance. Business people from Ohio had silver mining interests in the Arizona Territory, taking their request for Arizona territorial status to Congress. The U.S. Civil War was occurring at the time, and the Union needed silver, which Trimble explains as one of the main reasons for the passage of the Act.

The New Mexico Territory had a long history of enslavement of Native American people, first by each other and later by Hispanic settlers (cf. Genízaros). Although in 1860 there were relatively few African American slaves in New Mexico, the legislature formally approved slavery shortly before the Civil War.

During the war, the Confederate States of America established an entity called the Arizona Territory, which had different boundaries from modern Arizona. According to historian Martin Hardwick Hall, invading Confederate troops brought an unknown number of enslaved African Americans into the territory. Historian Donald S. Frazier estimates there were as many as fifty black slaves brought by Confederate officials and troops in his book Blood & Treasure: Confederate Empire in the Southwest.

== See also ==
- Reconstruction Era of the United States
