= Arizona Territorial Legislature =

Legislative body of Arizona Territory in the US

The Legislative Assembly of the Territory of Arizona served as the legislative body of the Arizona Territory. It was a bicameral legislature consisting of a lower house, the House of Representatives, and an upper house, the council. Created by the Arizona Organic Act, the legislature initially consisted of nine members in the council and eighteen members in the House, meeting once a year until 1869, when the U.S. Congress changed the meeting sessions to biannually. In 1881, the legislature expanded to twelve Council members and twenty-four Representatives.

The Arizona Territorial Legislature was replaced by the Arizona State Legislature after Arizona achieved statehood.

== Legislative sessions ==
Session	Year	Location
1st Arizona Territorial Legislature	1864	Prescott
2nd Arizona Territorial Legislature	1865	Prescott
3rd Arizona Territorial Legislature	1866	Prescott
4th Arizona Territorial Legislature	1867	Prescott
5th Arizona Territorial Legislature	1868	Tucson
6th Arizona Territorial Legislature	1871	Tucson
7th Arizona Territorial Legislature	1873	Tucson
8th Arizona Territorial Legislature	1875	Tucson
9th Arizona Territorial Legislature	1877	Tucson
10th Arizona Territorial Legislature	1879	Prescott
11th Arizona Territorial Legislature	1881	Prescott
12th Arizona Territorial Legislature	1883	Prescott
13th Arizona Territorial Legislature	1885	Prescott
14th Arizona Territorial Legislature	1887	Prescott
15th Arizona Territorial Legislature	1889	Prescott–Phoenix
16th Arizona Territorial Legislature	1891	Phoenix
17th Arizona Territorial Legislature	1893	Phoenix
18th Arizona Territorial Legislature	1895	Phoenix
19th Arizona Territorial Legislature	1897	Phoenix
20th Arizona Territorial Legislature	1899	Phoenix
21st Arizona Territorial Legislature	1901	Phoenix
22nd Arizona Territorial Legislature	1903	Phoenix
23rd Arizona Territorial Legislature	1905	Phoenix
24th Arizona Territorial Legislature	1907	Phoenix
25th Arizona Territorial Legislature	1909	Phoenix

== See also ==
- Members of the Arizona Territorial Legislature
