= Richard C. McCormick =

American politician, businessman, and journalist (1832–1901)

Richard Cunningham McCormick
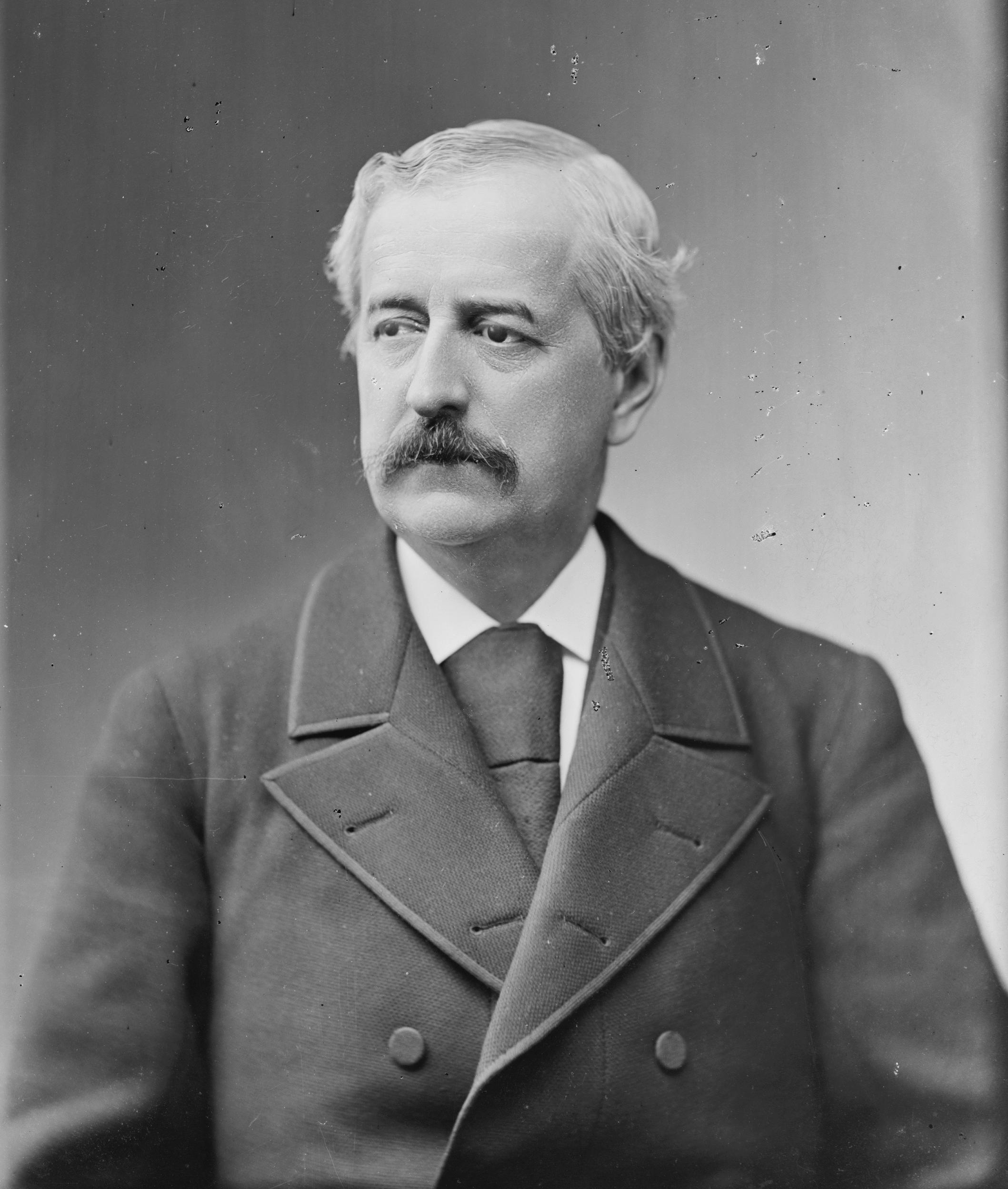

Member of the U.S. House of Representatives from New York's 1st district
- In office March 4, 1895 – March 3, 1897
- Preceded by: James W. Covert
- Succeeded by: Joseph M. Belford

Assistant Secretary of the Treasury
- In office April 3, 1877 – December 8, 1877
- President: Rutherford B. Hayes
- Preceded by: Curtis F. Burnham
- Succeeded by: John B. Hawley

Delegate to the U.S. House of Representatives from Arizona Territory
- In office March 4, 1869 – March 3, 1875
- Preceded by: Coles Bashford
- Succeeded by: Hiram Sanford Stevens

2nd Governor of Arizona Territory
- In office March 14, 1866 – December 13, 1868
- Nominated by: Andrew Johnson
- Preceded by: John Noble Goodwin
- Succeeded by: Anson P.K. Safford

1st Secretary of Arizona Territory
- In office December 29, 1863 – March 14, 1866
- Nominated by: Abraham Lincoln
- Preceded by: N/A (Newly created position)
- Succeeded by: James P. T. Carter

Personal details
- Born: May 23, 1832 New York City, U.S.
- Died: June 2, 1901 (aged 69) New York City, U.S.
- Party: Unionist/Republican
- Spouse(s): Margaret Hunt (1865–1867); Elizabeth Thurman (1873– )

Richard Cunningham McCormick Jr. (May 23, 1832 – June 2, 1901) was an American politician, businessman and journalist. He was the second governor of Arizona Territory, three times delegate to the U.S. House of Representatives from Arizona Territory and a member of the U.S. House of Representatives from New York. McCormick was a war correspondent during two conflicts and the creator of two Arizona newspapers.

== Background ==
McCormick was born on May 23, 1832, in New York City to Richard Cunningham and Sarah Matilda (Decker) McCormick. The senior McCormick was secretary of the New York merchants' exchange. The younger McCormick suffered from poor health and was educated at home by private tutors with the expectation he would attend Columbia University. Instead of enrolling in college, he became ill and was sent to Europe under the Victorian belief that travel had curative power. In 1854, while still in Europe, McCormick became a war correspondent reporting on the Crimean War. After his return, he wrote two books, A Visit to the Camp Before Sevastopol in 1855 and St. Paul's to St. Sophia in 1860.

At the age of 25, the redheaded McCormick went to work on Wall Street. Shortly thereafter, he became the YMCA's corresponding secretary and edited Young Men's Magazine for two years. In 1860, at the request of William Cullen Bryant, he became editor of the New York Evening Post. At the start of American Civil War, McCormick went to the front lines as a war correspondent.

Politically, McCormick was elected a public school trustee for New York's 15th ward in 1858. This was followed by his becoming a member of the Republican State Committee in 1860 and working on Abraham Lincoln's presidential campaign. In 1862, McCormick made an unsuccessful run for United States House of Representatives. The same year he was appointed chief clerk for the Department of Agriculture.

McCormick was married twice. The first time was to Margaret Grifiths Hunt of Rahway, New Jersey, on September 27, 1865. The couple had met aboard a steamboat bound for New York City from Panama earlier the same year. Margaret died on April 30, 1867, while giving birth to a stillborn child. McCormick's second marriage was to Elizabeth Thurman, youngest daughter of Senator Allen G. Thurman, on November 11, 1873.

== Arizona Territory ==
McCormick was nominated to be Secretary of Arizona Territory by President Lincoln on March 7, 1863. Following confirmation, he journeyed with Governor Goodwin's party to the newly formed territory. McCormick took his oath of office on December 29, 1863, as part of the Navajo Springs ceremony that officially established Arizona Territory. As part of his official duties, he designed the territory's first official seal.

Outside his official duties, McCormick began the Arizona Miner with a Ramage press he had brought with him. The newspaper's first edition was printed on March 9, 1864, at Fort Whipple and began regular operations in Prescott on June 22, 1864. McCormick's control of the newspaper aided his political career by ensuring he could always receive favorable press coverage. The paper also provided a forum for McCormick to share his thoughts with the people of Arizona. In 1868, following the territorial capital's move to Tucson, McCormick sold his property in Prescott and purchased an interest in the Weekly Arizonian. His association with the Arizonian continued till October 1, 1870, when the paper's editor withdrew support for McCormick. McCormick's response was to repossess the paper's printing press and begin a new newspaper, the Arizona Citizen, on October 15, 1870.

During his service within the territory, and later as territorial delegate, McCormick was a leader in Arizona Territory's "Federal Ring". This group was a coalition of territorial officials and leading citizens that worked in a non-partisan fashion to protect the lives and property of the territory's American population, establish law and order, and develop Arizona's economic potential. To achieve their goals, the clique crossed traditional political divides of the day, with Northern Republican governors appointing Southern Democrats and Hispanics to governmental positions. The "Federal Ring" dominated territorial politics between 1863 and 1877 and, while labeled a self-perpetuating oligarchy by critics, succeeded in providing a territorial government that was generally free of corruption and dishonesty.

After Governor Goodwin was elected territorial delegate and left for Washington in late 1865, Secretary McCormick became acting governor of Arizona Territory. He was officially appointed as governor on March 14, 1866. Among the chief issues McCormick faced were hostilities from Apache and other tribes. To deal with this threat he called for an increase in U.S. Army troops and a reorganization of small forts located throughout the territory into larger installations to maximize the number of soldiers available for action. Instead of the policy of extermination advocated by many within the territory, McCormick supported the creation of Indian reservations.

Economically, McCormick envisioned Arizona developing a mining-based economy similar to California's. To attract economic capital, he advocated a laissez-faire tax policy. McCormick also pushed for the creation of the roads, railroads, telegraph lines and postal routes needed for such an economy to function. He also asked Congress to acquire additional land from Mexico so that Arizona could have a port on the Gulf of California To meet the need for food, the governor called for settlers and "tame" Indians to engage in farming. To help protect the growing population from outlaws, McCormick asked the territorial legislation to create courthouses and jails.

== Territorial Delegate ==
McCormick announced his candidacy for territorial delegate on March 12, 1868, with the election scheduled for June 3, 1868. During his run, McCormick avoided normal party affiliations and instead ran as a non-partisan candidate under a "Unionist" banner. The election centered on the issue of the territorial capital having been moved the previous year, with allegations circulated that McCormick had been promised support from Pima County if he signed the bill. McCormick only won a single county during the election, Pima, but the margin was sufficient for him to be elected territorial delegate.

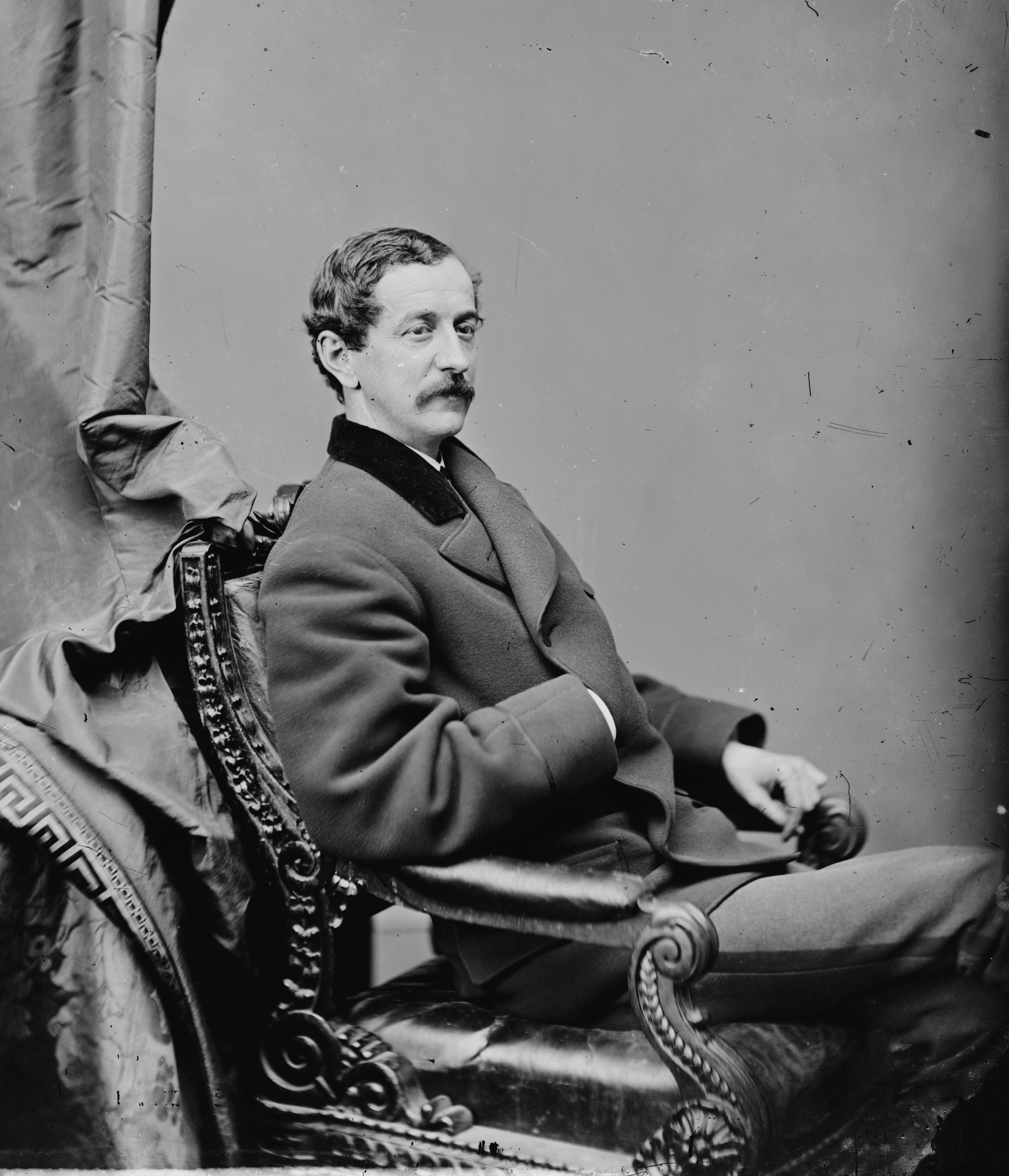
Richard C. McCormick between 1860 and 1875

McCormick left Arizona Territory on December 13, 1868, to journey to Washington DC. On his arrival in the Congress, McCormick's past acquaintances with influential people of the day allowed him to become unusually effective as a territorial delegate. This influence allowed him to be chosen as chairman by the group of seven sitting territorial delegates in their efforts to obtain unified legislation in areas affecting United States territories.

During his first term, McCormick's efforts were focused on the Apache Wars and the establishment of additional postal routes within Arizona. Other areas he worked on included resolving land title issues involving the town of Prescott and having Arizona Territory declared a separate land district. After a return to Arizona to campaign, McCormick won re-election for his second term on November 8, 1870.

McCormick's second term was again focused on the Apache Wars. The delegate was at odds with President Ulysses S. Grant's decision to send Vincent Colyer to negotiate with the Apache but was successful in his efforts to have George Crook resume military operations against the Apache. During May 1871, while visiting his mother in New York, McCormick contracted erysipelas and was blind for a short time. His right eye recovered, but the left was permanently lost.

McCormick's opposition to President Grant's Indian "Peace Plan" allowed him to win re-election to his third term without opposition. The term also saw him win a number of reforms. Using an argument that qualified individuals were not applying to be territorial officials because the cost of living exceeded the pay for various positions, he was able to have the pay for territorial legislators raised to US$6 per day and territorial governor's pay raised to US$3,000 per year. He also succeeded in having the administration of U.S. territories moved from the State Department to the Department of the Interior, with the transfer occurring on March 1, 1873. McCormick also worked on a bill to restrict the killing of American bison except for use as food, legislation resolving citizenship issues of Mexican-born residents of Arizona who lived in land acquired through the Gadsden Purchase, further expansion of mail routes and criminalization of acts that damaged or destroyed parts of the new military telegraph system. McCormick chose not to run for a fourth term.

== Later life ==
After leaving office as territorial delegate, McCormick become a commissioner of the Centennial Exposition. This was followed by becoming secretary of the Republican National Committee in August 1876 and his working in the U.S. presidential campaign of Rutherford B. Hayes. In 1877, McCormick was appointed Assistant Secretary of the Treasury. This was followed by his being named United States Commissioner General to the Paris Exposition in November 1877. At the end of his service as commissioner, he was appointed Commander, Legion of Honor, by the President of France in 1878.

McCormick was offered ministries to Brazil in 1877 and Mexico in 1879 but declined both offers. Instead, he returned to New York City and settled in the Jamaica neighborhood of Queens. There he became involved in a number of business efforts, as president and/or director of several mining companies and trustee of a bank. McCormick made unsuccessful runs for a seat in the United States House of Representatives in 1882 and 1886 before his election in 1894 to represent New York's first district for a single term.

McCormick died on June 2, 1901, at his house in Jamaica.

McCormick Street in downtown Tucson, Arizona, was named in his honor.

Political offices
Preceded by John Noble Goodwin	Governor of Arizona Territory; 1866–1868	Succeeded by Anson P.K. Safford
U.S. House of Representatives
Preceded by Coles Bashford	Delegate to the U.S. House of Representatives from Arizona Territory; 1869–1875	Succeeded by Hiram Sanford Stevens
Preceded by James W. Covert	Member of the U.S. House of Representatives from New York's 1st congressional district 1895–1897	Succeeded by Joseph M. Belford
