= Arizona Territory =

Territory of the United States (1863–1912)

Territory of Arizona
- Organized incorporated territory of the United States
- 1863–1912
- Flag of the United States (1908–1912)

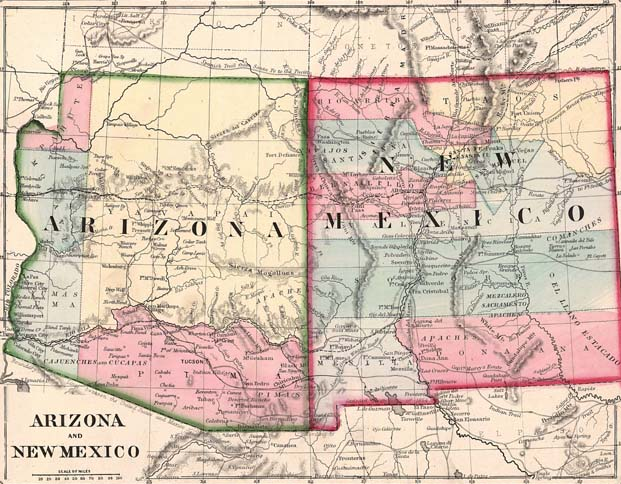
- Map of the Arizona and New Mexico Territories, showing existing counties
- Capital: Fort Whipple (1863–64); Prescott (1864–67); Tucson (1867–77); Prescott (1877–89); Phoenix (1889– )
- Government
  - Type: Organized incorporated territory
- Governor
  - 1863–1866: John Noble Goodwin
  - 1909–1912: Richard Elihu Sloan
- Legislature: Arizona Territorial Legislature
- History
  - Arizona Organic Act: February 24, 1863
  - Statehood of Arizona: February 14, 1912
Preceded by	Succeeded by
New Mexico Territory; Confederate Arizona	Arizona; Nevada

The Territory of Arizona, commonly known as the Arizona Territory, was a territory of the United States that existed from February 24, 1863, until February 14, 1912, when the remaining extent of the territory was admitted to the Union as the state of Arizona. It was created from the western half of the New Mexico Territory during the American Civil War.

== History ==
Historical population
Year	Pop.	±%
1870	9,658	—
1880	40,440	+318.7%
1890	88,243	+118.2%
1900	122,931	+39.3%
1910	204,354	+66.2%
Source: 1870–1910;

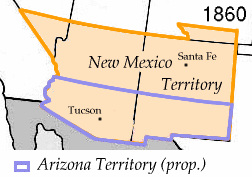

Following the expansion of the New Mexico Territory in 1853, as a result of the Gadsden Purchase, there were several proposals for the organization of a separate Territory of Arizona. These proposals arose from concerns about the ability of the territorial government in Santa Fe to effectively administer the newly acquired southern portions of the territory.

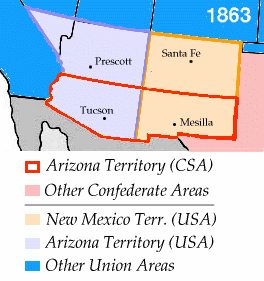

At a conference held in Tucson on August 29, 1856, an initial petition was issued to the U.S. Congress, signed by 256 people, requesting organization of the territory and elected Nathan P. Cook as the territorial delegate to Congress. In January 1857, the bill for the organization of the territory was introduced into the House of Representatives; the proposal was defeated on the grounds that the population of the proposed territory was too small. A similar proposal was defeated in the Senate. The proposal for creation of the territory was controversial in part because of the perception that the New Mexico Territory was under the influence of southern sympathizers who wanted to expand slavery into the southwest.

In February 1858, the New Mexico territorial legislature adopted a resolution in favor of the creation of the Arizona territory, but with a north–south border along the 109th meridian, with the additional stipulation that all the Indians of New Mexico would be removed to northern Arizona.

In April 1860, impatient for Congress to act, a convention of 31 delegates met in Tucson and adopted a constitution for a provisional territorial government of the area south of 34°N. The delegates elected Dr. Lewis S. Owings as provisional governor.

=== American Civil War ===
At the outbreak of the Civil War, sentiment in the territory was in favor of the Confederacy. Territorial secession conventions called at Mesilla and Tucson in March 1861 adopted an ordinance of secession, established a provisional Arizona Territory with Owings as its governor, and petitioned the Confederate Congress for admission.

The Confederacy regarded the territory as a valuable route for possible access to the Pacific Ocean, with the specific intention of capturing California. In July 1861, a small Confederate force of Texans under the command of Lieutenant Colonel John R. Baylor assaulted Fort Fillmore at Mesilla in the eastern part of the territory. After the fort was abandoned by the Union garrison, Baylor's force cut off the fleeing Union troops and forced them to surrender. On August 1, 1861, Baylor issued a "Proclamation to the People of the Territory of Arizona", taking possession of the territory for the Confederacy, with Mesilla as the capital and himself as the governor, establishing Confederate Arizona. Baylor's subsequent dismantling of the existing Union forts in the territory left the white settlers at the mercy of the Apache, who quickly gained control of the area and forced many of the white settlers to seek refuge in Tucson.

On August 28, a convention met again in Tucson and declared that the territory formed the previous year was part of the Confederacy. Granville H. Oury was elected as delegate to the Confederate Congress. Oury drafted legislation authorizing the organization of the Confederate Territory of Arizona. The legislation passed on January 13, 1862, and the territory was officially created by proclamation of President Jefferson Davis on February 14.

The following month, in March 1862, the U.S. House of Representatives, now devoid of the southern delegates and controlled by Republicans, passed a bill to create the United States Arizona Territory using the north–south border of the 109th meridian. The use of a north–south border rather than an east–west one denied a de facto ratification of the Confederate Arizona Territory. The house bill stipulated that Tucson was to be the capital. The final bill passed the Senate in February 1863 without the Tucson-as-capital stipulation, and was signed into law by President Abraham Lincoln on February 24, the date of the official organization of the U.S. Arizona Territory.

== Capital ==
The Gadsden Purchase, 1853

The first capital was established in 1864 at Prescott, in the northern Union-controlled area. The capital was moved to Tucson in 1868, and back to Prescott in 1877. The capital was finally moved to Phoenix on February 4, 1889.

== Boundary ==
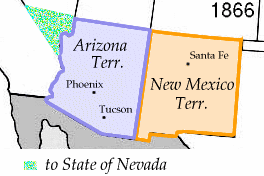

The boundaries for the original territory, if they had kept their same size, would have made present-day Las Vegas part of Arizona. In 1867, though, Congress transferred the Arizona Territory's northwestern corner, specifically most of its land west of the Colorado River, to the state of Nevada. This reduced the territory to its current area.

== Statehood ==
The territory was admitted to the Union as the 48th state on February 14, 1912.

== Territorial proclamation ==
Proclamation to the People of Arizona.

I, John N. Goodwin, having been appointed by the President of the United States, and duly qualified, as Governor of the TERRITORY OF ARIZONA, do hereby announce that by virtue of the powers with which I was invested by an act of the Congress of the United States, providing a temporary government for the Territory. I shall this day proceed to organize said government. The provisions of the act, and all laws and enactments established thereby, will be enforced by the proper Territorial officers from and after this date.

A preliminary census will forthwith be taken, and thereafter the Judicial Districts will be formed, and an election of members of the Legislative Assembly, and the other officers provided by the Act be ordered.

I invoke the aid and cooperation of all Citizens of the Territory in my efforts to establish a government whereby the security of life and property will be maintained throughout its limits, and its varied resources be rapidly and successfully developed.

The Seat of Government will, for the present, be at or near Fort Whipple.

Signed at Navajo Springs, Arizona

December 29, 1863

— By the Governor: Richard C. McCormick, Secretary of the Territory

== See also ==
- American Civil War, 1861–1865
  - Territory of Arizona (Confederate States), 1861–1862
- Apache Wars, 1851–1886
- Pah-Ute County, "Arizona's Lost County" 1865–1871
- Camp Grant Massacre, 1871
- Gadsden Purchase, 1853
- Governors of the Territory of Arizona
- History of Arizona
- James Reavis, The "Baron of Arizona"
- Mexican–American War, 1846–1848
  - Treaty of Guadalupe Hidalgo, 1848
- Navajo Wars, 1846–1865
- Territorial evolution of the United States
