= Phoenix Country Club =

Arizona country club

- Location in Arizona Location in the United States
- 33.482°N 112.063°W

Club information
- Location: 2901 N 7th St; Phoenix, Arizona, U.S.
- Elevation: 1,100 feet (340 m)
- Established: October 25, 1900; 125 years ago
- Type: Private
- Tota holes: 18
- Tournaments: Phoenix Open (1932, 1933, 1935, 1939–54, 1956, 1958, 1960, 1962, 1964, 1966, 1968, 1970, 1972, 1974–86); Western Open (1941, 1942); Charles Schwab Cup Championship (2017, 2018, 2019)
- Website: phoenixcountryclub.com
- Designed by: Harry Collis, Tom Lehman, and John Fought
- Par: 71
- Length: 6,764 yd (6,185 m) Longest hole is #7 - 571 yd (522 m)
- Course rating: 72.4
- Slope rating: 129
- Course record: 61 - Johnny Miller (1970, 1975), Homero Blancas (1972), Ben Crenshaw (1979), Don Pooley (1986), Vijay Singh (2018)

Phoenix Country Club is a country club in the southwestern United States, located in Phoenix, Arizona. The club was founded 126 years ago in 1899 and was moved to its current location in 1921. Golf Connoisseur Magazine rated Phoenix Country Club among top 100 Most Prestigious Private Clubs in America in 2006. The club was chosen for the “ultimate mix of course, history, membership, tradition and class.” In 2009 and 2014, PCC was selected by its peers as a Platinum Club of America. The original golf course designed by Harry Collis was redesigned by Tom Lehman and John Fought in 2002.

== History ==
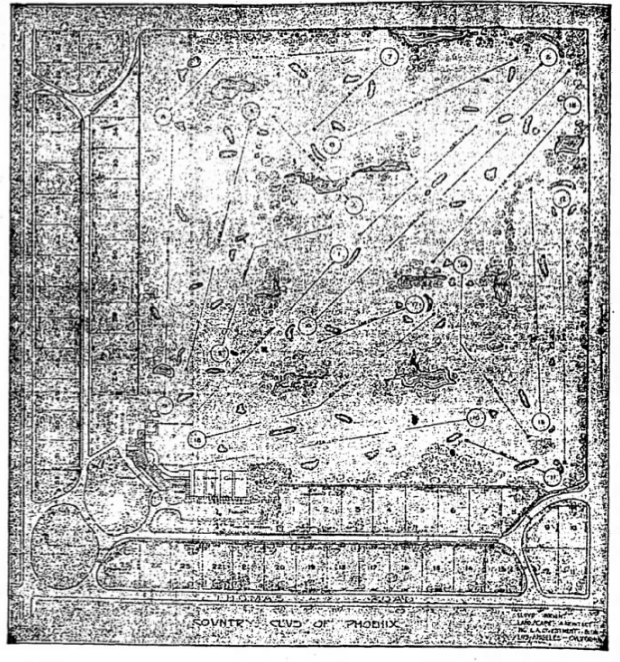
Original 1920 site plan for Phoenix Country Club created by Lloyd Wright

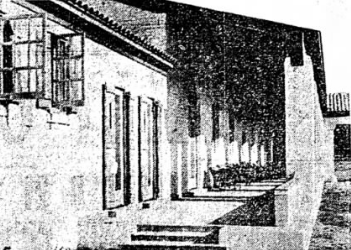
The veranda on the front of the original clubhouse facing southwest, 1921.

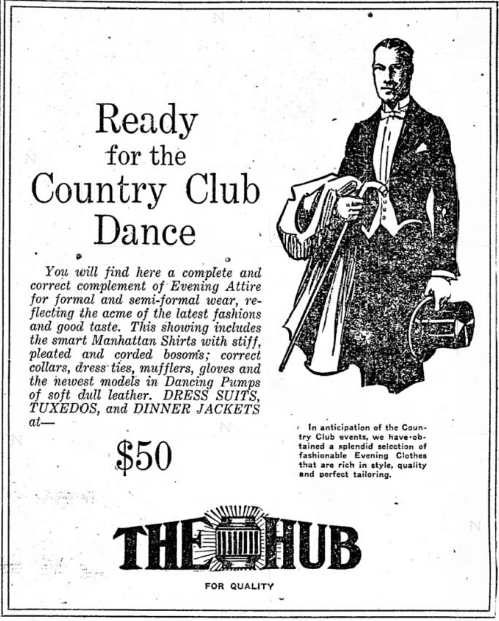
A local formalwear advertisement for the occasion of the 1921 inaugural ball

Phoenix Country Club was officially incorporated on October 25, 1900 by a 12-member board including Webster Street, Chief Justice of the Arizona Territorial Supreme Court; and Dwight B. Heard, president of the Arizona Cotton Association. On October 29, 1919, the club voted to purchase a 160-acre tract of land at 7th Street and Thomas Road for the construction of a new club with and 18-hole golf course, tennis grounds, and a club house. This new property was to become the current location for the club. The land was purchased for $56,000.

Golf course designer Harry Collis, of the Flossmoor Country Club in Chicago was hired to design the layout for the new course in 1920. Los Angeles-based Landscape Architect Lloyd Wright designed the landscape gardening plans for the course. A former employee of the landscape architectural firm of Olmsted Brothers, Wright was the son of architect Frank Lloyd Wright and was noted for his landscape design of the Panama–California Exposition in San Diego, and later became a production designer for Paramount Studios. To fund the construction of the new $200,000 club facilities, 52 homesites were incorporated into the plans for the new location and are known as "Country Club Estates."

The new club opened on October 27, 1921. A white tie ball celebrating the opening of the new club was held on October 28 and was restricted to membership. The following day, the golf course was inaugurated with a men's golf tournament alongside a bridge tournament for female members. The original clubhouse was of brick, painted white, with red tile roofing. It was of the Spanish Colonial style of architecture, the main portion of the structure facing a southwesterly direction. From this main portion were two wings, on at each end extending in northeasterly and southeasterly directions, respectively.

The building featured a main reception hall, ballroom, and banquet hall; men's and women's locker facilities and showers; a men's grill room; a dining room; large ornamented tile fireplaces; French doors; and verandas where afternoon tea was commonly served. Also featured were a swimming pool and four tennis courts. The entire structure was designed by Phoenix architectural firm Lescher & Kibbey.

On September 12, 1922, the body of Phoenix Country Club secretary Guy N. Dernier was found, strangled to death and cast into the Arizona Canal. No water was found in his lungs during the autopsy meaning that he had been strangled before he was disposed of in the canal. In his Dodge automobile, parked along the canal bank, were his eyeglasses, watch, purse and articles of clothing. Found among his personal effects was a diary implicating twenty two society women in both Phoenix and Los Angeles with whom he had carried out affairs. Many of the women had compensated him for their liaisons, one paying him $600. Of the twenty two women all were married but one, a widow. Dernier had been an employee of Montgomery Ward in Chicago and came to Phoenix in 1917 for treatment for tuberculosis. He was a members of the Benevolent and Protective Order of Elks. It was the opinion of the police that one of the twenty one husbands of the women with whom Dernier had had an affair was the murderer.

Following the opening of their new club, Phoenix Country Club became the seat of leadership for the Border States Tennis Association, a member of the United States Lawn Tennis Association with members in Arizona, New Mexico, Sonora, and Texas. The president and treasurer of the association were members Dwight B. Heard and Mrs. Ernest W. Lewis, respectively. The Phoenix Open was first hosted at Phoenix Country Club in 1932 but was discontinued after the 1935 tournament. The rebirth of the Phoenix Open came in 1939 when member Bob Goldwater Sr. convinced fellow Thunderbirds to help run the event. The Thunderbirds, a prominent civic organization in Phoenix, were not as enthusiastic about running the event as he was, leaving Goldwater Sr. to do most of the work in getting a golf open started. Beginning in 1955, the Arizona Country Club alternated as event host with Phoenix Country Club; this arrangement lasted until Phoenix Country Club took The Arizona Country Club's turn in 1975 and became the event's permanent home again.

The tournament was moved in 1987 to its current home, the Stadium Course at TPC of Scottsdale, northeast of downtown Phoenix. During its time as host of the Phoenix Open, the club hosted such notable golfers as Ben Hogan, Byron Nelson, Jack Nicklaus, Arnold Palmer, Gene Littler, Johnny Miller, Miller Barber, Ben Crenshaw, Hal Sutton, and many others. The club also hosted the Western Open in 1941 and 1942.

In 1961, a new contemporary clubhouse designed by the architectural firm Edward L. Varney & Associates was constructed adjacent to the old clubhouse at a cost of $1,000,000. The new clubhouse is 68,000 square feet in size and features a second floor with 35 guest rooms, larger kitchen and dining facilities and larger locker room facilities. A new swimming pool and seven additional tennis courts were also constructed. The original clubhouse was demolished soon after the completion of the new clubhouse and was replaced with a new terrace. The 1961 clubhouse continues to serve as the clubhouse for Phoenix Country Club.

In 2002, the 80-year-old Collis course was redesigned by Tom Lehman and John Faught.

In 2017, Phoenix Country Club became the host of the Charles Schwab Cup Championship, the season finale of the PGA Tour Champions.

In 2019, the club hosted the Arizona Tennis Classic, an ATP Challenger Tour men's tennis tournament.

== Notable Members ==
Notable current and former members Include:

- Emil Ganz (1838-1922), Businessman and three-time mayor of Phoenix, Arizona
- Webster Street (1846-1908), Chief Justice of the Arizona Territorial Supreme Court from 1897 till 1902
- Oakes Murphy (1849-1908), Fourteenth Governor of Arizona Territory
- Richard Elihu Sloan (1857-1933), Associate Justice of the Arizona Territorial Supreme Court, a United States District Court judge and as the 17th and final Governor of Arizona Territory
- Dwight B. Heard (1869-1929), Rancher and president of the Arizona Cotton Association famous for publishing the Arizona Republican, now The Arizona Republic, from 1912 to 1929
- Ernest W. Lewis (1875-1927), Associate Justice of the Arizona Territorial Supreme Court from 1909 till Arizona statehood in 1912
- Del Webb (1899-1974), Real estate developer and a co-owner of the New York Yankees known for founding and developing the retirement community of Sun City, Arizona, and for many works of his company, the Del Webb Corporation
- Barry Goldwater (1909-1998), five-term United States Senator from Arizona (1953–65, 1969–87) and the Republican Party's nominee for President of the United States in the 1964 election
- William G. Bennett (1924-2002), former chairman of Circus Circus Enterprises and owner of the Sahara Hotel and Casino
- Earl H. Carroll (1925-2017), United States federal judge in senior status, for the United States District Court for the District of Arizona
- Joan Ganz (1929-), Co-creator of the children's television show Sesame Street and granddaughter of member Emil Ganz
- Bill Bidwill (1931-2019), Principal owner and chairman of the board of the Arizona Cardinals
- Jerry Colangelo (1939-), Former owner of the Phoenix Suns of the NBA and the Arizona Diamondbacks of Major League Baseball
- Connie Hawkins (1942-2017), Former power forward for the Phoenix suns
- Jim Pederson (1942-), Co-founder of the commercial development firm The Pederson Group, and Chairman of the Arizona Democratic Party from 2001 to 2005
- Betsy Bayless (1944-), 16th Secretary of State of Arizona from September 5, 1997 until January 6, 2003
- Alice Cooper (1948-), American singer, songwriter, musician and occasional actor
- Grant Woods (1954-), Attorney general of Arizona from 1991 until 1999
- Ryne Sandberg (1959-), Former professional baseball player, coach, and manager
- Dennis K. Burke (1962-), Former United States Attorney for the District of Arizona
- Michael Bidwill (1964-), President of the Arizona Cardinals and son of member Bill Bidwill

== Historic Residences ==
Of the 52 homesites in Country Club Estates, 48 are still single family homes. Many of those 48 homes were constructed prior to World War II and are therefore eligible for historic registration. Of 48 homes, 4 are listed on the national register of historic places.

	Name on the Register	Image	Date listed	Location	Architect	Description
22	Bennitt Mansion	Bennitt Mansion	August 12, 2009 (#09000609)	126 E. County Club Dr. 33°28′52″N 112°03′29″W	Phoenix, Arizona	Spanish Colonial Revival mansion built in 1925
28	Borah House	Borah House	March 15, 2018 (#100002209)	72 E. Country Club Dr. 33°28′52″N 112°03′37″W	Phoenix, Arizona	. This house, built in 1931, once belonged to Dr. Charles “Charley” Borah (1905 - 1980)
52	Craig Mansion	Craig Mansion	August 18, 1992 (#92001013)	131 E. Country Club Dr. 33°28′48″N 112°03′25″W	Phoenix, Arizona	Spanish Colonial Revival mansion built in 1928
99	Fred G. Hilvert House	Fred G. Hilvert House	October 11, 2016 (#16000700)	106 E. Country Club Dr. 33°28′52″N 112°03′33″W	Phoenix, Arizona	This house was built in 1929.
