= Otto Kotouc =

Otto Kotouc may refer to:

- Otto Kotouc Jr. (1913–2000), American politician from Nebraska, son of Otto Kotouc Sr.
- Otto Kotouc Sr. (1885–1973), American politician from Nebraska
