= Ferdinand Elsbach =

German textile merchant and manufacturer (1864–1931)

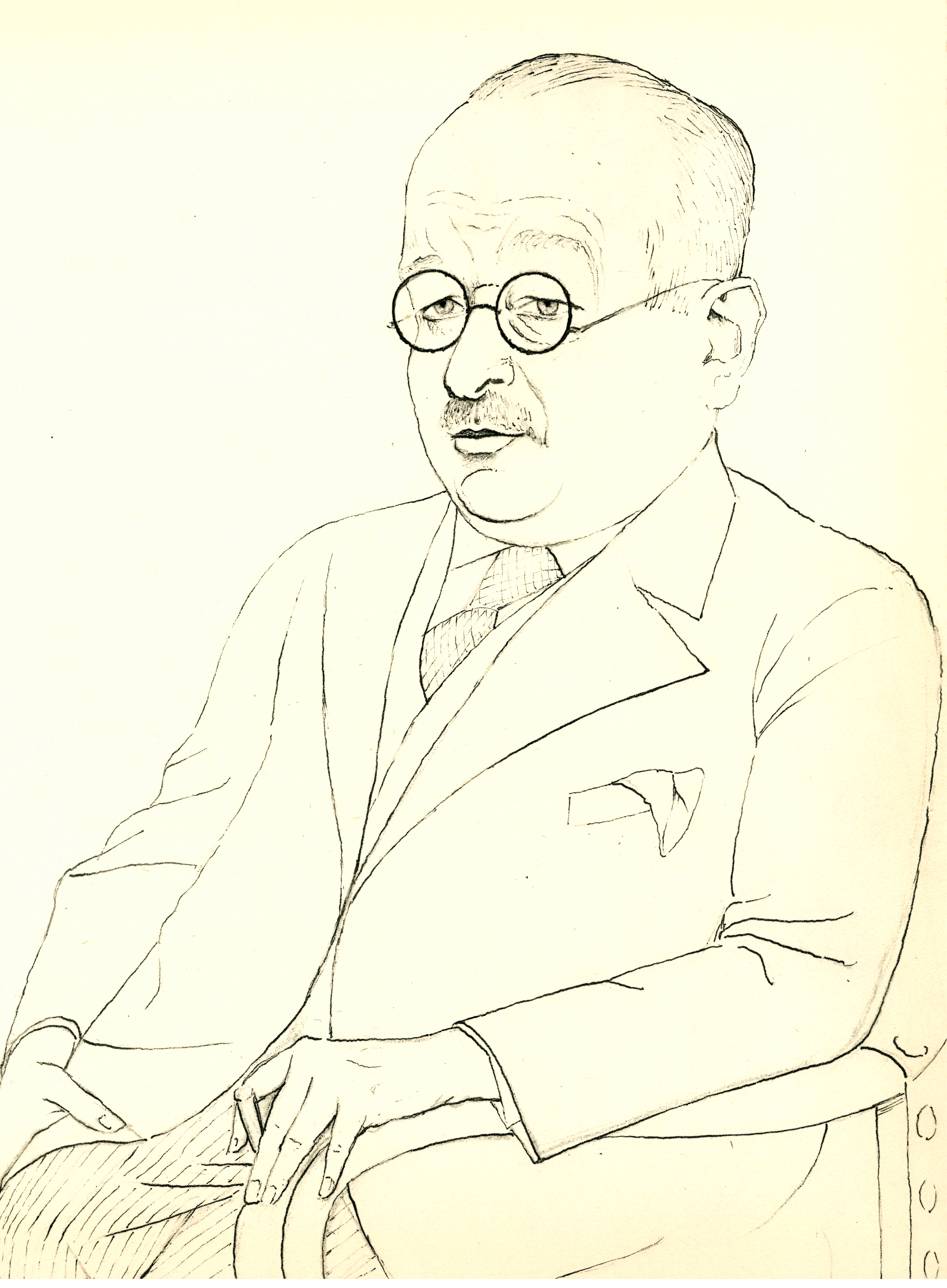
- Ferdinand Elsbach, drawn by August Heitmüller around 1929
- Born: 15 January 1864; Walldorf, Thuringia Germany
- Died: 5 June 1931 (aged 67); Hanover
- Occupations: Textile merchant and manufacturer
- Known for: Business leader in German textile industry
- Spouse(s): Ida Elsbach, née Rosenberg
- Children: 3

Ferdinand Elsbach (born 15 February 1864 in Walldorf an der Werra; died 5 June 1931 in Hanover) was a German textile merchant and manufacturer.

== Early life ==
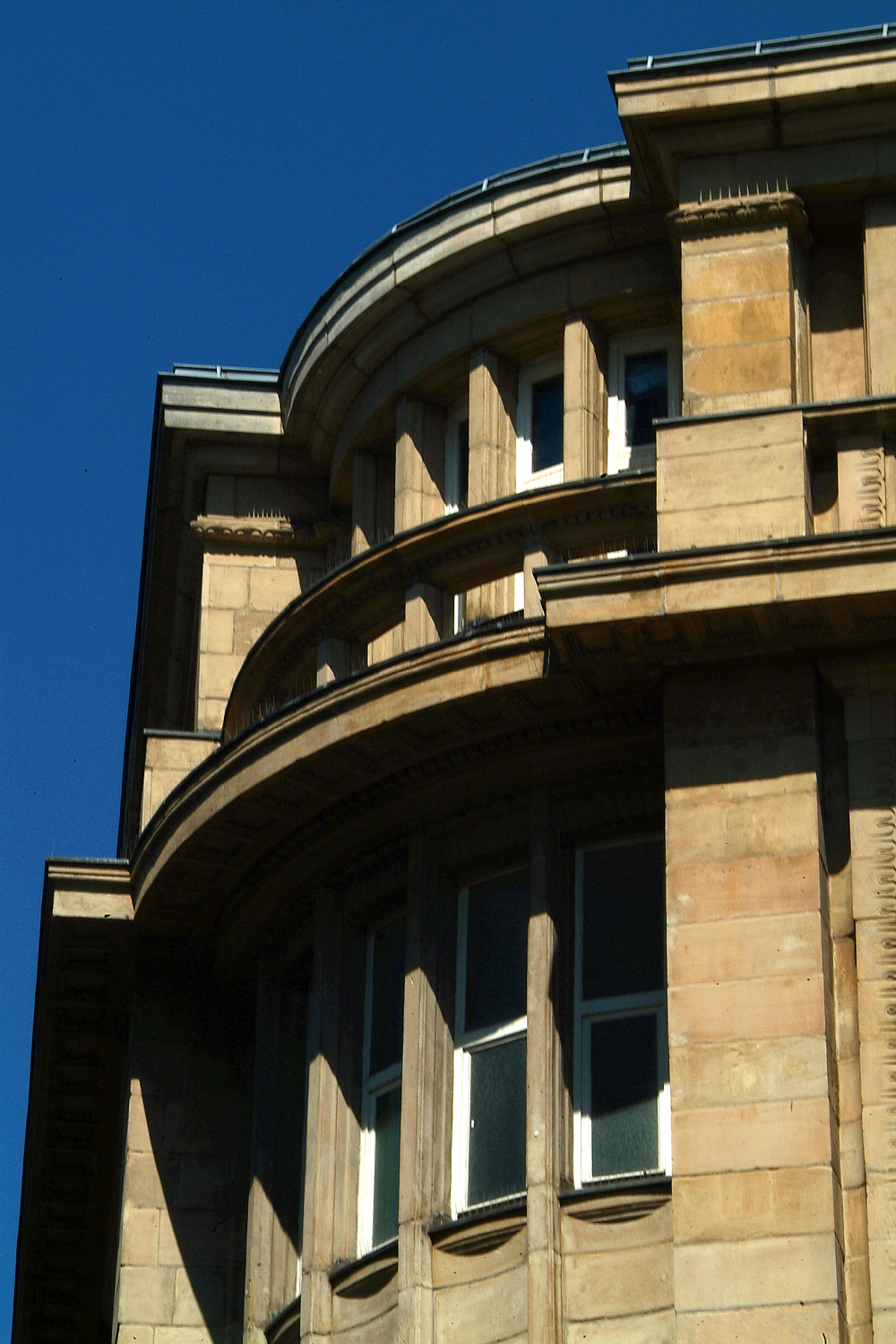
Detail on the department store Zum Stern

Elsbach came from a Jewish family, attended grammar school in Heiligenstadt and trained as a businessman in Göttingen. He moved to Hanover in 1882 and at the age of 25 founded the Elsbach & Frank retail store with Julius Frank for textile goods, which they called Kaufhaus zum Stern. Specializing in men's and boys' clothing, Elsbach was one of the first to manufacture goods in-house, known as "self-manufacturing".

Involved in business and employers' associations, Elsbach became a co-founder and board member of the Reich Association for Men's and Boys' Clothing, based in Düsseldorf. During the Weimar Republic, he was elected First Chairman of the Association of the Hanover Retail Trade in 1923, which emerged from the Employers' Association for the Retail Trade, and also represented the association in the Hanover Chamber of Industry and Commerce from 1925. He was also the second chairman of the Lower Saxony Retail Trade Association and a co-founder and board member of the employers' association for the tailoring trade, Hanover local group. He was also a member of the board of the Lower Saxony-Kassel Business Association, and worked as a commercial judge.

Elsbach had been a member of the board of the Hanoverian Jewish community since 1910; as the second head of the community, he was in charge of Jewish welfare until 1923. He was also involved with the Red Cross.

The Elsbachs had three children: twins Walter (born on 24 February 1893) and Kurt (later Curt) Ferdinand (born on 24 February 1893 in Hanover; died on 5 November 1967 in California), and Lucie (born in 1900).

== Persecution ==
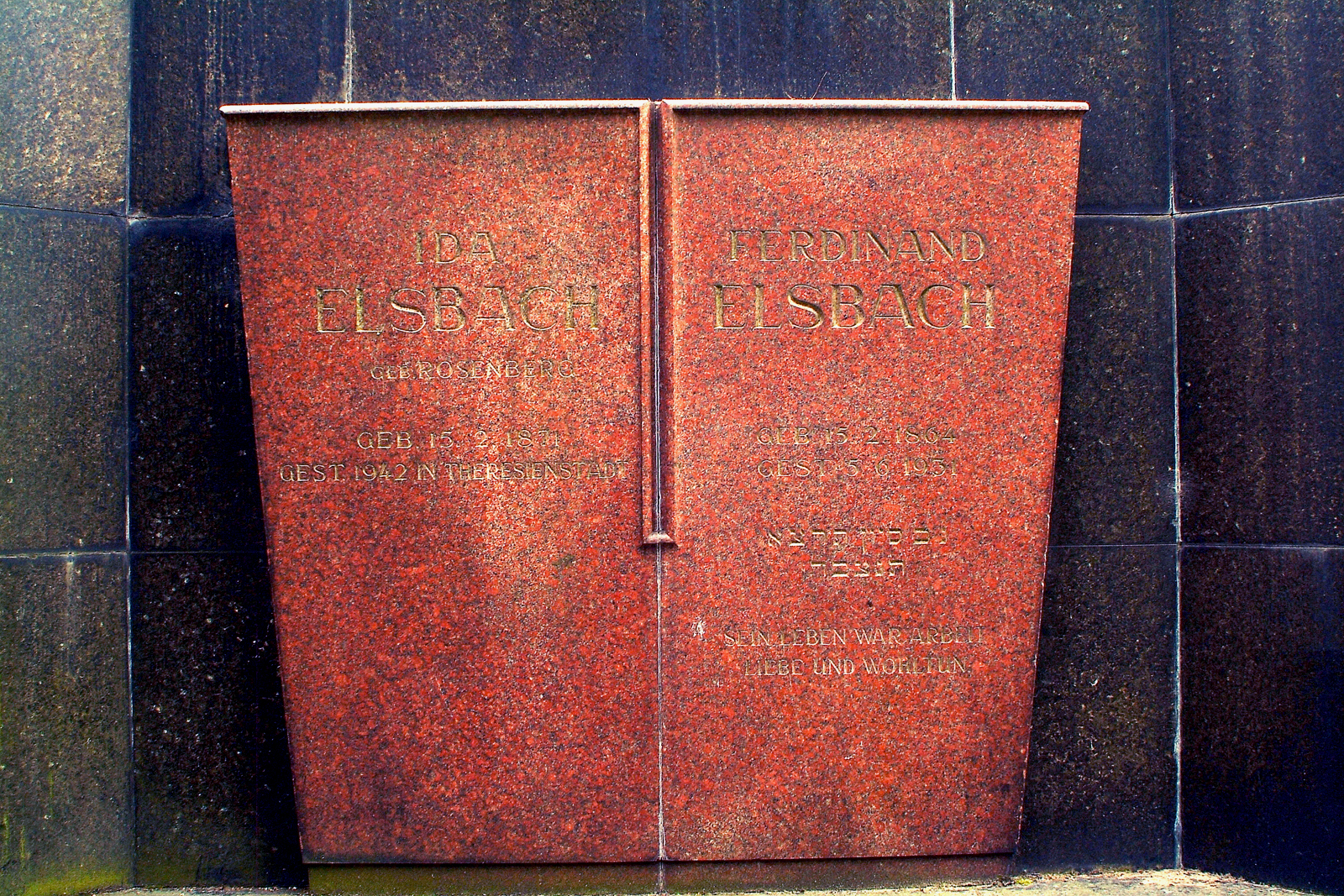
Plaques for Ferdinand and Ida Elsbach at the Jewish cemetery An der Strangriede

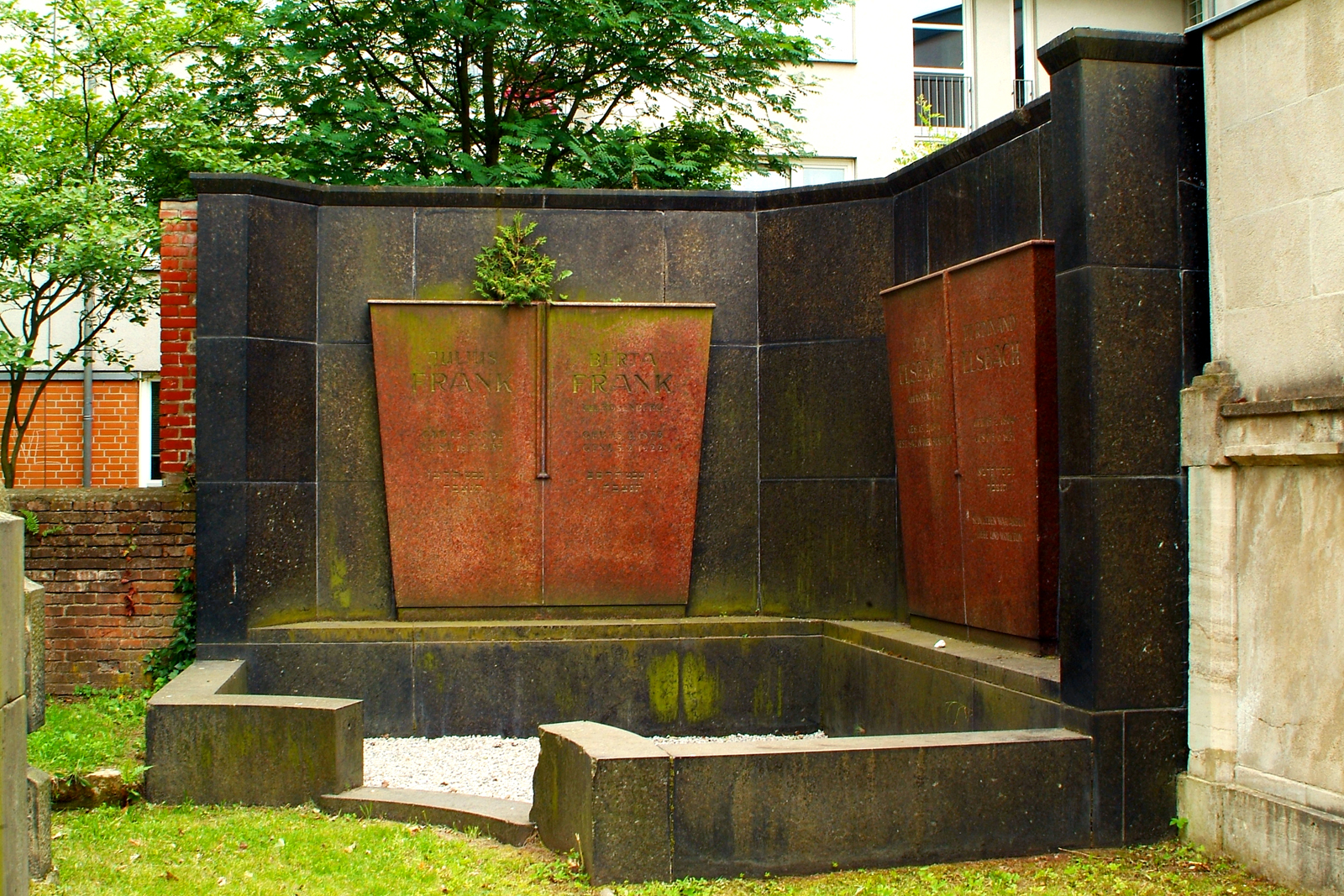
Tomb of the Elsbach and Frank families designed by Wilhelm Mackensen

After his death in 1931, Elsbach's widow Ida, née Rosenberg (born 15 February 1871) was persecuted and murdered by the Nazis because of her Jewish heritage. She was deported to the Theresienstadt Ghetto in 1942 where she died just 10 days later. A Stolperstein (literally 'stumbling stone' and metaphorically 'stumbling block') was laid for Ida on 23 September 2010.

The joint tomb for the Elsbach and Frank families at the Jewish cemetery An der Strangriede was designed by the architect Wilhelm Mackensen.

== See also ==
- History of the Jews in Hannover
- Aryanization

== Literature ==
- anonym: Hannoversche Köpfe aus Verwaltung, Wirtschaft, Kunst und Literatur, (August Heitmüller zeichnete die Köpfe. Wilhelm Metzig entwarf die Gesamtausstattung des Werkes.), Bd. 1. Verlag H. Osterwald, Hannover (um 1929), ohne Seitennummern
- Georg Wenzel: Deutscher Wirtschaftsführer. Lebensgänge deutscher Wirtschaftspersönlichkeiten. Ein Nachschlagebuch über 13000 Wirtschaftspersönlichkeiten unserer Zeit. Hanseatische Verlagsanstalt, Hamburg/Berlin/Leipzig 1929, DNB-IDN 948663294, Sp. 544.
- Peter Schulze: Elsbach, Ferdinand. In: Dirk Böttcher, Klaus Mlynek, Waldemar R. Röhrbein, Hugo Thielen: Hannoversches Biographisches Lexikon. Von den Anfängen bis in die Gegenwart. Schlütersche, Hannover 2002, ISBN 3-87706-706-9, S. 108; online über Google-Bücher
- Peter Schulze: Elsbach, Ferdinand. In: Klaus Mlynek, Waldemar R. Röhrbein (Hrsg.) u. a.: Stadtlexikon Hannover. Von den Anfängen bis in die Gegenwart. Schlütersche, Hannover 2009, ISBN 978-3-89993-662-9, S. 159.
