= Harold Prichard =

American politician (1914/1915–2003)

Member of the Nebraska Legislature from the 1st district
- In office January 7, 1947 – January 4, 1949
- Preceded by: Joseph C. Reavis
- Succeeded by: Charles Vogt Jr.

Personal details
- Born: 1914 or 1915 Enterprise, Kansas
- Died: July 3, 2003 (aged 88)
- Party: Democratic
- Education: Peru State Teachers College (A.B.); University of Nebraska (M.A., J.D.)
- Occupation: Attorney

Military service
- Allegiance: United States
- Branch/service: United States Army
- Years of service: 1942–1946

Harold C. Prichard (1914 or 1915 – July 3, 2003) was a Democratic politician and attorney from Nebraska who served as a member of the Nebraska Legislature from the 1st district from 1947 to 1949.

== Early life ==
Prichard was born in Dickinson County, Kansas, and moved to Nebraska in 1925. He graduated from Falls City High School and later from Peru State Teachers College with his bachelor's degree and the University of Nebraska with his master's degree. He served in the United States Army from 1942 to 1946 during World War II as a field artillery officer.

== Nebraska Legislature ==
In 1940, Prichard ran for the Nebraska Legislature from the 1st district, but lost in the nonpartisan primary, winning 13 percent of the vote to Otto Kotouc Jr.'s 35 percent and Fred Rockwell's 22 percent. In 1946, when State Senator Joseph C. Reavis, who succeeded Kotouc, declined to seek re-election, Prichard ran to succeed him, defeating Everett Barr in the general election with 52 percent of the vote.

In 1948, Prichard ran for re-election. He was challenged for re-election by Charles Vogt Jr., and was defeated with 46 percent of the vote.

== Post-legislative career ==
After leaving the legislature, Prichard enrolled at the University of Nebraska College of Law. In 1950, he ran for the legislature again, but lost to Otto Kotouc Sr..

Prichard practiced law in Falls City, and served as a justice of the peace. He ran for the newly created Nebraska State Board of Education in 1954 from the 1st district, and narrowly lost in the nonpartisan primary. He was the Democratic nominee for Richardson County Clerk of the District Court in 1958, and lost to Republican Douglas D. McIntyre.

== Death ==
Prichard died on July 3, 2003.
