= Daniel H. Pinney =

American judge (1837–1921)

Associate Justice, Arizona Territorial Supreme Court
- In office July 1882 – November 9, 1885
- Nominated by: Chester A. Arthur
- Preceded by: DeForest Porter
- Succeeded by: William Wood Porter

Personal details
- Born: June 2, 1837 Albion, New York, US
- Died: May 13, 1921 (aged 83) Chicago, Illinois, US
- Resting place: Forest Home Cemetery
- Party: Republican
- Spouse(s): Mary A. Lee (m. 1865–1872) Mary E. Bowman (m. 1875)
- Profession: Attorney

Daniel Hyde Pinney (June 2, 1837 – May 13, 1921) was an American jurist and politician who served as Associate Justice of the Arizona Territorial Supreme Court from 1882 till 1885 as well as a single term in the Illinois House of Representatives.

== Early life ==
Pinney was born on June 2, 1837, to Nancy (Johnson) and Martin Pinney in Albion, New York. He was educated in public schools and, beginning in 1854, worked for two years on an enlargement project for the Erie Canal. In 1856, Pinney moved to Chicago, Illinois where he worked at a variety of jobs including clerk and mail agent on the railroad between Indiana and Joliet, Illinois.

== Career ==
While in Chicago, Pinney began a study of law. He was admitted to the Illinois bar in late 1862. After obtaining his law license, he practice law in Wilmington, Illinois for two years before moving to Joliet. In addition to his legal practice, Pinney ran a small farm a short distance from town. After his move to Joliet, he was elected to the first of four one-year terms as City attorney in 1864. In 1876, Pinney was elected to the Illinois House of Representatives as an independent. As a member of the legislature, he supported David Davis's candidacy for the United States Senate. He returned to his private legal practice after his term of office.

Pinney was married twice. His first marriage came in 1865 to Mary A. Lee of Albion, New York. The couple had a son, William L., before her death in 1872. His second marriage, in 1874, was to Mary E. Bowman of Shawneetown, Illinois. This union produced three children: Harry Bowman, Sidney Breese, and Nannie E.

President Chester A. Arthur nominated Pinney to replace DeForest Porter as Associate Justice of the Arizona Territorial Supreme Court on June 14, 1882. The nominee received senate confirmation five days later. He arrived in Arizona on July 19, 1882. Pinney was assigned to the second judicial district, composed of Gila, Maricopa, and Yuma County, Arizona with Pinal county being added in 1885. He lived in Phoenix and traveled to locations in other counties when his duties called for it.

While officially a Republican, Pinney actively avoided allowing political considerations to influence his decisions. His political neutrality resulted in his gaining admirers from across the political spectrum. About a dozen decisions by Judge Pinney have survived. His legal writings were brief, to the point, and dealt with common problems of the day. Both Tombstone Mill and Mining Company v. The Way Up Mining Company', 1 Arizona 426 (1883), Tweed v. Lowe, 1 Arizona 288 (1884) dealt with mine ownership disputes that had developed additional legal concerns. Dowling v. Hunt, 2 Arizona 8 (1885) was an early Arizona case involving bad checks while Bremen v. Foreman, 1 Arizona 413 (1883) was concerned with the limitations of a mechanic's lien.

The inauguration of President Grover Cleveland marked the end of Pinney's time on the bench. Pinney wrote to President Cleveland, saying "I know you do not wish to do me a wrong. Can I have a hearing?" DeForest Porter, who at the time was the chairman of the local bar association, wrote to protest Pinney's removal. Despite this, William Wood Porter interrupted a court session on November 9, 1885, for the purpose of replacing Justice Pinney.

After leaving the bench, Pinney initially practiced law in Phoenix. He lived in California for a year before returned to Illinois and settling in Chicago. There, he established a private legal practice.

After President Benjamin Harrison took office, Pinney wrote him to ask for reappointment to the Arizona bench. His application letter was marked with "Mugwump" and nothing became of his request. A similar request following the 1897 inauguration of President William McKinley also resulted in no action. Pinney returned to Arizona in 1904 and 1905 to assist in efforts to block a joint statehood proposal that would have admitted Arizona and New Mexico Territory as a single state. During the 1912 United States Presidential Election, he was a Woodrow Wilson supporter.

== Later life ==
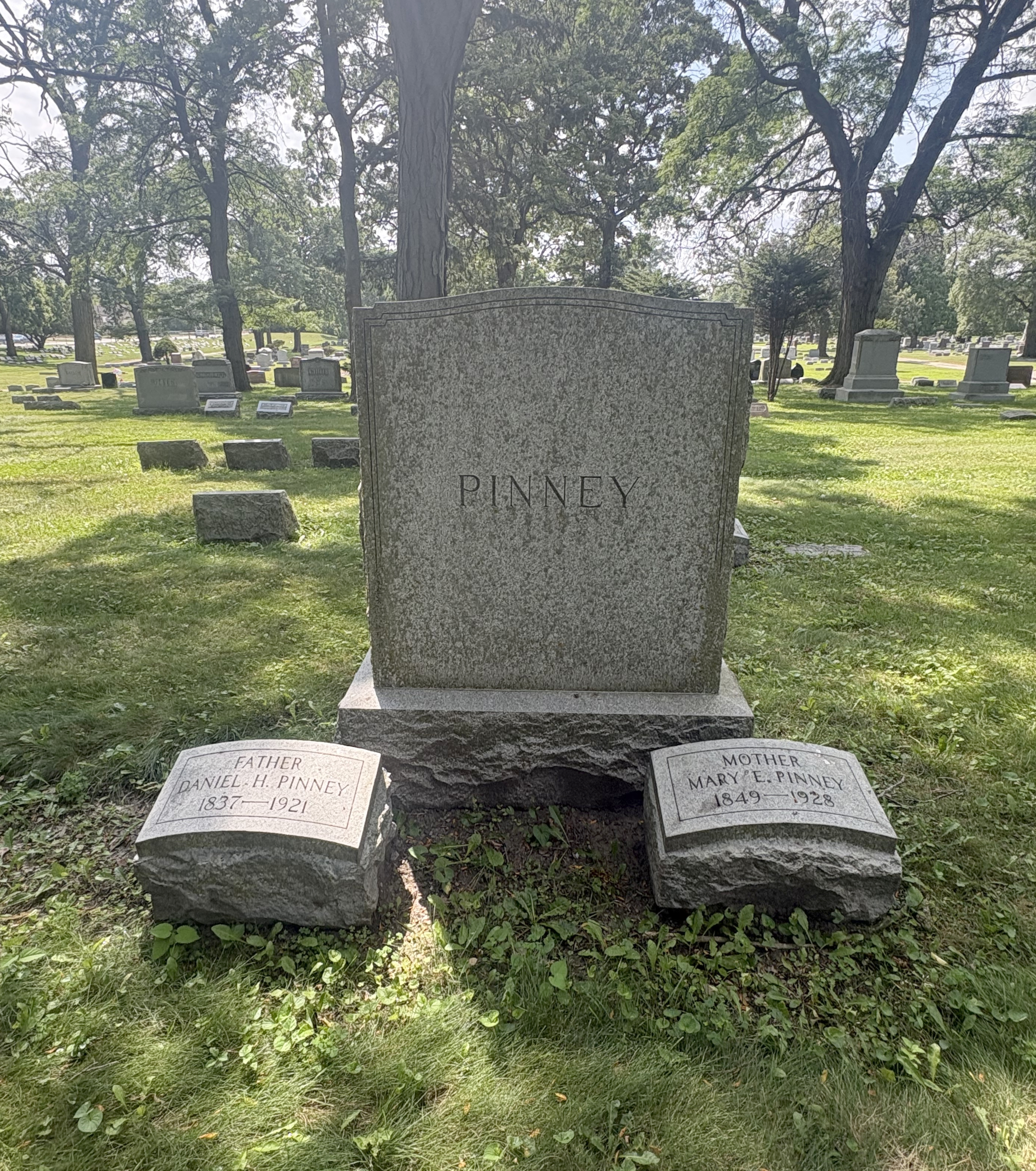
Pinney's grave at Forest Home Cemetery

After retiring, Pinney moved to a farm near Lawrence, Michigan. Failing health however forced his return to Chicago. During his final eight months, he was bedridden. Pinney died in Chicago on May 13, 1921. He was buried in Forest Home Cemetery in Forest Park.
