= Bekleidungshaus Otto Werner =

Former clothing store in Hanover, Lower Saxony

Coordinates: 52°22′23″N 9°44′14″E

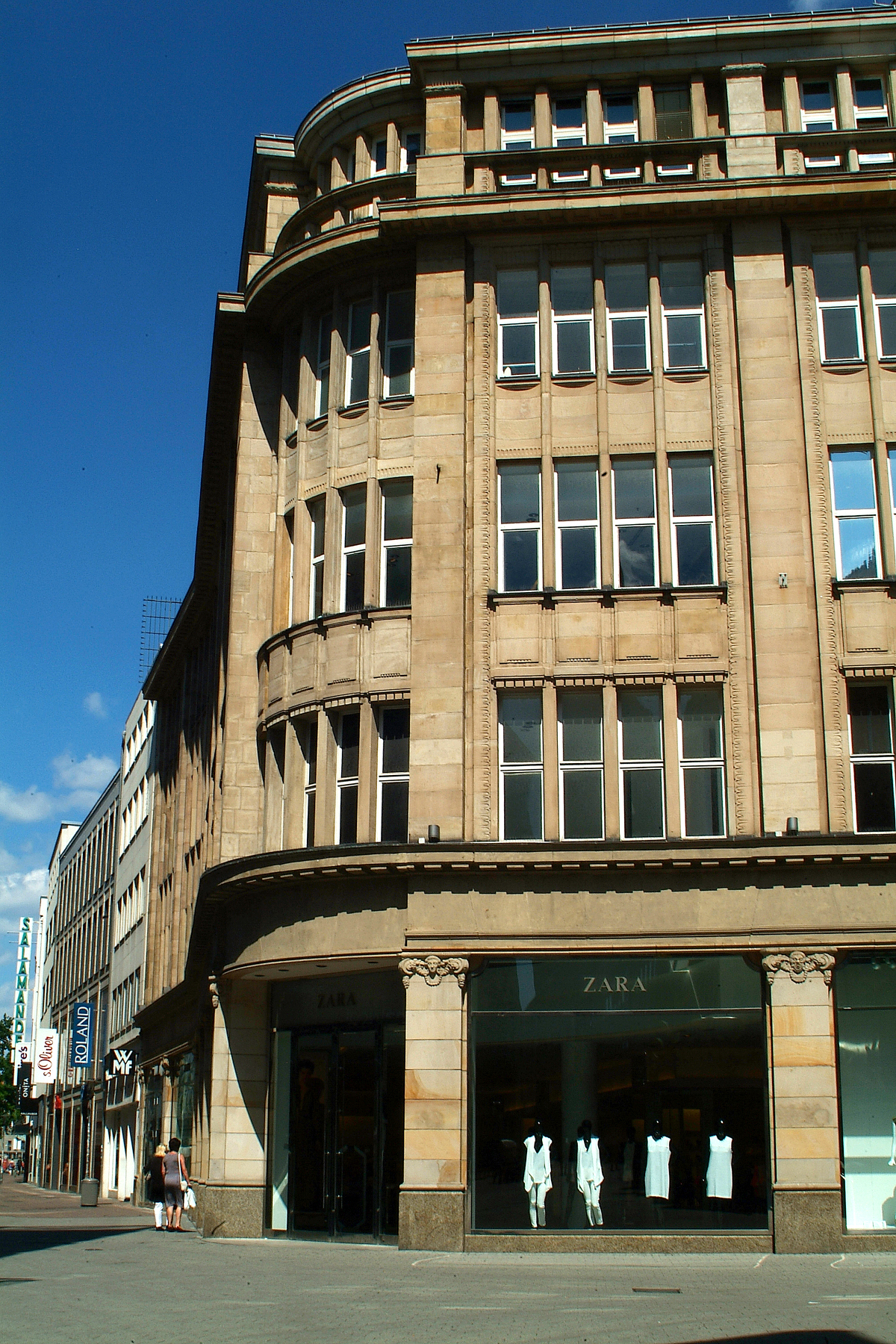
The original store resided in the building constructed for Elsbach & Frank in 1910–1911 at the corner of Große Packhofstraße and Osterstraße.

The Otto Werner clothing store (Bekleidungshaus Otto Werner) opened in 1932 in Hanover, the capital of Lower Saxony, Germany. By 1985, the store had expanded to several branches throughout the state. After the original store closed in 1999, the enterprise ceased operating in 2001.

== History ==
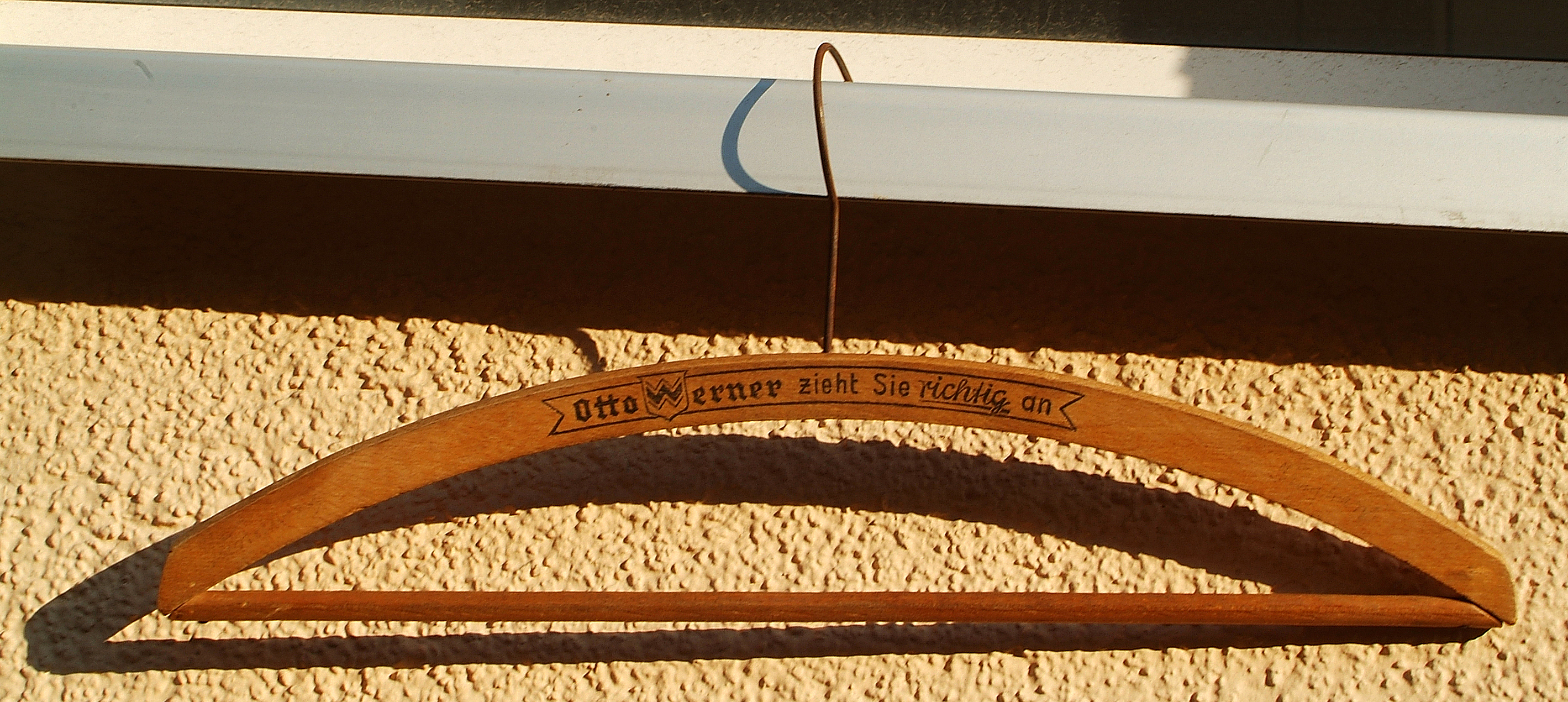
Coat hanger with company emblem 'W' and screwed-on trouser bar as well as the inscription 'Otto Werner dresses you properly' (Otto Werner zieht Sie richtig an), c. 1930s

The company was opened in 1932 by the merchant Otto Werner (1884–1955) and his nephew Werner Sauerwald (1910–1996) after they had acquired the building of the previously Jewish-owned department store Elsbach & Frank on the corner of Osterstraße and Große Packhofstraße. Like their predecessors, the merchants offered women's, men's and children's outerwear with an adjoining made-to-measure department.

== World War II ==
Although the building was partially destroyed by the aerial bombings of Hanover during World War II, it was the only department store in the city to survive. The façade, restored in 1988, in particular remained largely undamaged.

Other department stores were less fortunate. For example, the entire Sternheim & Emanuel department store complex opposite was destroyed by Allied bombing.

== Postwar ==
After the war, the Magis department store made a new start, initially in part of Otto Werner's clothing store, until the new Magis building on Kröpcke was completed in 1952. Otto Werner fell ill and from 1950 onwards, Sauerwald was solely responsible for managing the company until he retired in 1985. The company operated two clothing stores and three fashion stores in Hanover and other cities in Lower Saxony with a total of around 350 employees.

Towards the end of the 1990s sales fell, and in 1999 the flagship store in Hanover city centre was sold. In 2001 the business ceased operating. Since 2002, the internationally operating Spanish fashion chain Zara has been trading in the building.

== General references ==
- Röhrbein, Waldemar R. (2009). "Werner – Otto W. Bekleidungshaus". In Klaus Mlynek; Waldemar R. Röhrbein (eds.). Hannover City Lexicon. From the beginnings into the present (in German). Hanover: Schlütersche Verlagsgesellschaft. p. 672. ISBN 978-3-89993-662-9. OCLC 458691668. OL 45212542M. Wikidata Q2327579.
