= William Wood Porter =

American military officer and jurist (1826–1907)

Associate Justice, Arizona Territorial Supreme Court
- In office November 9, 1885 – August 1889
- Nominated by: Grover Cleveland
- Preceded by: Daniel H. Pinney
- Succeeded by: Joseph Henry Kibbey

Personal details
- Born: September 8, 1826 Orange County, Virginia
- Died: January 17, 1907 (aged 80) Santa Rosa, California
- Party: Democratic
- Spouse: Elizabeth Dabney (m. 1866)
- Profession: Attorney

Military service
- Allegiance: Confederate States
- Branch/service: Confederate States Army
- Years of service: 1861–1865
- Rank: Captain
- Battles/wars: Mill Springs; Shiloh; Raymond

William Wood Porter (September 8, 1826 – January 17, 1907) was an American military officer and jurist who served as Associate Justice of the Arizona Territorial Supreme Court from 1885 until 1889.

== Early life ==
Porter was born September 8, 1826, in Orange County, Virginia. His parents were George C. and Susan (Wood) Porter. His father owned cotton farms in Tennessee and the family moved there when Porter was an infant. The family moved to Mississippi while Porter was still a child. After studying law, Porter was admitted to the Mississippi bar. In his later years he was described as having a fair complexion, gray hair, blue eyes, and being of medium height. His most recognizable feature was his nose "which was of unusual size and prominence."

In 1850, Porter moved to California and two years later was elected county attorney for San Joaquin County. He was appointed to fill a vacancy as Judge of Calaveras County in 1855 and was elected to a four-year term on the bench the next year.

At the beginning of the American Civil War, Porter returned to Virginia and became a captain in the Confederate States Army. Initially he served as an aid to General George B. Crittenden. He served with gallantry during the battles of Mill Springs, Shiloh, and Raymond. After honorable mentions in his commander's reports, he joined General Joseph E. Johnston's staff. His service earned Porter a recommendation for promotion shortly before the war's end.

Following the war, Porter went to Mexico before returning to Jackson, Mississippi, in May 1866. There he practiced law. In 1866, Porter married Elizabeth Dabney. The union produced five daughters. Porter and his family moved to Merced, California, in 1872. They lived there briefly before making a permanent home in Santa Rosa, California.

President Grover Cleveland gave Porter a recess appointment as Associate Justice of the Arizona Territorial Supreme Court on October 23, 1885. Among the individuals recommending him for the appointment was United States Supreme Court Justice Stephen Johnson Field. Porter took office on November 9. The United States Senate refused to confirm the nomination in June 1886 and Cleveland resubmitted the nomination a month later. The Senate confirmed the second bid on July 27, 1886. While Porter's nomination was being confirmed, Chief Justice John C. Shields was fighting an unsuccessful bid for his own confirmation. In October 1886, Porter wrote to Attorney General Augustus Hill Garland asking for appointment as Chief Justice if Shield did not receive confirmation.

Porter employed an easily comprehended writing style for the twenty opinions he authored on the territorial court. In United States v. Tenney, 2 Arizona 127 (1886), Porter wrote a dissent involving the prosecution of Mormons under the Edmunds Act. He also tended to draw cases with alluring backgrounds. In Shaw v. County of Pima, 2 Arizona 399 (1888), a disputed election resulted in one man taking office and accepting the accompanying salary. When it was determined his opponent had actually won the election, the new-found winner sued for the pay he would have received if he had taken office at the start of his term. Porter denied the claim. Hobson v. The New Mexico and Arizona Railroad Company, 2 Arizona 171 (1886), was a case where a worker had lost both of his legs while hauling railroad ties when a drunken railroad engineer had suddenly started a locomotive. An initial award of $30,000 had been cut in half by the district court. Porter's ruling upheld the reduced payment on the theory the worker had assumed all risks involved with his employment.

In Stiles v. Western Union Telegraph Company, 2 Arizona 308 (1887), a banking institution based in Tombstone sent a telegraph to its office in Tucson instructing the branch office to stop paying out funds. The telegram was delayed, resulting in the loss of funds by the bank. Porter's ruling allowed for partial recovery of the lost funds under the theory the bank's employees would not have made any payments after the telegram was received. Western Mining Company v. Toole, 2 Arizona 82 (1886) was a case involving a forged check that had been presented to a bank and been pronounced genuine by the company's bookkeeper. A $1,251 judgment against the company was upheld as the bank had previously used the bookkeeper's expertise to validate previous checks even though the bookkeeper lacked formal authority to grant such approvals.

With Porter's term set to expire in another two days, President Benjamin Harrison appointed Joseph Henry Kibbey to be his replacement on August 5, 1889. After leaving the bench, Porter remained in Phoenix and practiced law. He requested to return to the Arizona bench after the resignation of Chief Justice Henry C. Gooding in May 1893 and in September 1893 as a replacement for Richard Elihu Sloan. Several years later, Porter moved back to Santa Rosa, California. He became seriously ill in the early 1900s but recovered partially. The 1906 San Francisco earthquake troubled him greatly and was listed as a contributing factor on his death certificate. Porter died in Santa Rosa on January 17, 1909. He was buried in the Santa Rosa Rural Cemetery.
