= Joan Ganz Cooney =

American television writer and producer (born 1929)

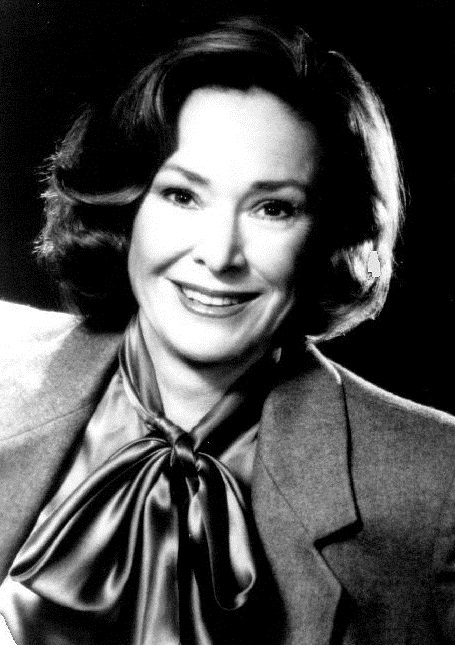
- Cooney in 1985
- Born: Joan Ganz; November 30, 1929 (age 96); Phoenix, Arizona, U.S.
- Education: North High School; Dominican College; University of Arizona (BA)
- Occupations: Television writer; television producer
- Known for: Children's Television Workshop (1968-2000) (renamed) Sesame Workshop (2000–present); Sesame Street (1969–present)
- Spouses: Tim Cooney (m. 1964; div. 1975); Peter G. Peterson (m. 1980; died 2018)
- Relatives: Emil Ganz (grandfather)

Joan Ganz Cooney (née Ganz; born November 30, 1929) is an American television writer and producer. She is one of the founders of Sesame Workshop (formerly Children's Television Workshop or CTW), the organization famous for the creation of the children's television show Sesame Street, which was co-created by her. Cooney grew up in Phoenix and earned a Bachelor of Arts in education from the University of Arizona in 1951. After working for the State Department in Washington, D.C., and as a journalist in Phoenix, she worked as a publicist for television and production companies in New York City. In 1961, she became interested in working for educational television, and became a documentary producer for New York's first educational TV station WNET (Channel 13). Many of the programs she produced won local Emmys.

In 1966, Cooney hosted what she called "a little dinner party" at her apartment near Gramercy Park. In attendance was her then-husband Tim Cooney, her boss Lewis Freedman, and Lloyd Morrisett, an executive at the Carnegie Corporation, in which the potential of television to teach young children was discussed. Cooney was chosen to oversee and direct the creation of what eventually became the children's television program Sesame Street, which premiered in 1969, and the CTW, the organization that oversaw its production. Cooney was named CTW's first executive director. As one of the first female executives in American television, her appointment was called "one of the most important television developments of the decade".

Cooney remained executive director of the CTW until 1990 when she became the chair of CTW's executive board. She served as a board member or trustee for many organizations, and received numerous awards and honorary degrees. In 2007, the Sesame Workshop founded The Joan Ganz Cooney Center.

== Early life and education ==
Joan Ganz was born on November 30, 1929, in Phoenix, Arizona, to Sylvan Ganz, a banker, and Pauline (née Reddon), a homemaker. Her father was from Phoenix. Her father was Jewish and her mother was Catholic. Her grandfather Emil Ganz was a tailor from Walldorf, Thuringia, in Germany, who immigrated to the U.S. in 1858 and was president of the First National Bank of Arizona and mayor of Phoenix for three terms. Joan Ganz was the youngest of three siblings. She described her childhood as "upper middle class, country club atmosphere" and stated, "I was raised in the most conventional way, raised to be a housewife and a mother, to work an interesting job when I got out of college, and to marry at the appropriate age, which would have been twenty-five."

Ganz attended North High School in Phoenix, where she was active in school plays. She stated that her biggest influence as a teenager was her teacher Bud Brown, whose lectures about the civil rights movement, poverty, the free press, and antisemitism in Europe "absolutely inflamed" her and changed her life. Brown was later investigated as a Communist. She went to Dominican College, an all-girls Catholic institution in San Rafael, California, for a year before transferring to the University of Arizona in 1948, where she was a member of Kappa Alpha Theta. She stopped acting in college because her father refused to support her in that career. She chose education, even though she was not interested in becoming a teacher, on the recommendation of her mother and because as she later stated, "It was something that girls of my generation did because teaching was acceptable."

== Early career ==
After graduating in 1951, Ganz moved to Washington, D.C., where she worked as a clerk and typist at the State Department. She was exposed to Father James Keller's Christopher Movement, which inspired her to become involved with television and the media. Cooney later said, "Father Keller said that if idealists didn't go into the media, nonidealists would." She returned to Phoenix and despite no experience in journalism, took a job as a reporter at the Arizona Republic. Eighteen months later, in 1953 and at the age of 23, she moved to New York City and was a publicist for the next ten years, initially for David Sarnoff at RCA, then at NBC writing press releases and soap opera synopses, and then for the United States Steel Hour at CBS. During this time, she became involved with liberal Democratic politics and "fell in with a literary set of young writers and editors who gathered at the West Side apartment of Partisan Review editor William Phillips". Some of this "notable group" included Jason Epstein and Norman Mailer. In 1956, after many years of depression, Cooney's father committed suicide at his home in Phoenix.

Her literary contacts, political savvy, and vast interest in the "world of ideas"—in addition to disarming self-confidence—got her hired [at Channel 13]. Her masterful organization skills and intuitive grasp of the zeitgeist of the times won her success.

— Writer Louise A. Gikow, Sesame Street: A Celebration

While Cooney was working for the U.S. Steel Hour, a colleague left to work for the educational television station WGBH-TV in Boston; her reaction was life-changing: "What?! There is educational television?!" She later stated, "I knew that I was born to be in educational television; it was St. Paul on the highway." In 1961, she began to track the progress of a court case in which a New York City nonprofit group was attempting to acquire Newark, New Jersey–based independent station WNTA-TV (channel 13), which would become the precursor of PBS station WNET, the first public television station in the New York area. When channel 13 became non-commercial two years later as WNDT, Cooney applied for a position as the station's publicist, but the general manager told her they needed producers. "I can produce," she told him, even though she had no experience in producing television shows. She later stated, "I've never been qualified for any job I've been hired for." According to television historian Cary O'Dell, WNDT hired her because of the ties she had made through her political activities and associations with Partisan Review. Cooney later said during an interview with the Archive of American Television that the transition to becoming a documentary producer was not difficult for her because she was well-read and aware of the issues of the day, adding, "I felt like I'd died and gone to heaven, dealing with foreign policy and domestic policy and civil rights, which became the great passion in those years for me."

Taking a pay cut, Cooney and her boss Lewis Freedman produced what author Michael Davis called "a series of teach-ins on major issues". One of her first programs was called Court of Reason, a weekly live debate show; notable guests included Malcolm X and Calvin Butts. She produced a debate show on America's policy about Cuba that aired the week before the Cuban Missile Crisis. She also produced another debate show called Poverty, Anti-Poverty, and the World, in which poor people were brought into the studio to confront the government officials responsible for developing anti-poverty programs. Although the ratings were low, Cooney and Freedman won Emmys for its production, and as Davis stated, "the viewers who did tune in were serious-minded adults who cared about matters of race, injustice, and the imbalance of opportunity in New York and beyond." She also produced inexpensively-made documentaries that she later called "Little Grandma Moses documentaries" for WNDT that were well received by their viewers, including A Chance at the Beginning, which featured the precursor of Head Start that won her a local Emmy and was later used to train Head Start teachers. She later reported that WNDT had won eight out of 13 New York Emmys in one year.

In February 1964, at age 34, she married Timothy Cooney, a staff member of New York mayor Robert Wagner, Jr. They met while she was working on A Chance at the Beginning. He was also director of public relations for the New York City Department of Labor and director of New York's Office of Civil Defense. Timothy Cooney would eventually become "an unpaid advocate for the urban poor". Cooney credited him, whom Davis called "a radical feminist," for making her into a feminist, and later said that he was very supportive and encouraging. Davis called the Cooneys "a delightfully unmatched set, a Spencer Tracy and Katharine Hepburn twosome who married despite differences in upbringing, station, and sobriety".

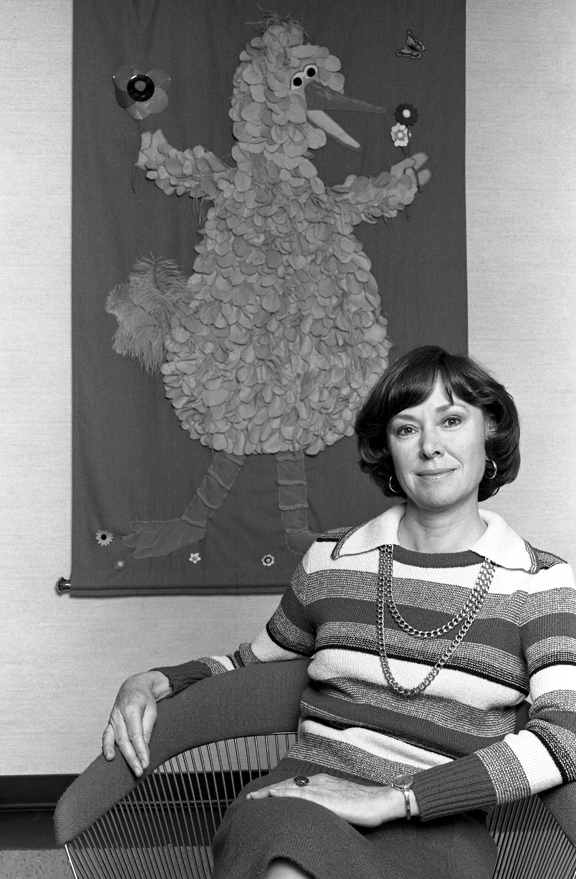
Joan Ganz Cooney, in her apartment, portrait by Lynn Gilbert, 1977, New York

== Sesame Street and the Children's Television Workshop ==
In the winter of 1966, Cooney hosted what she called "a little dinner party" at her apartment near Gramercy Park. in attendance was her husband; her boss, Lewis Freedman; and Lloyd and Mary Morrisett, whom the Cooneys knew socially. Lloyd Morrisett was a mid-level executive at Carnegie Corporation (who later became its CEO), and was then responsible for funding educational research. The conversation turned to the possibilities of using television to educate young children; Morrisett raised the question, "Do you think television could be used to teach young children?" Cooney replied, "I don't know, but I'd like to talk about it." According to Davis, the party was the start of a five-decade-long professional relationship between Cooney and Morrisett. A week later, Cooney and Freedman met with Morrisett at the offices of Carnegie Corporation to discuss doing a feasibility study on creating an educational television program for preschoolers. Freedman was opposed to Cooney's involvement because he did not think she would be interested in a project that focused on children and because he did not want to lose her at WNDT, but she was chosen to do the study.

In the summer of 1967, Cooney took a leave of absence from WNDT and, funded by Carnegie Corporation, traveled the U.S. and Canada interviewing experts in child development, education, and television. She reported her findings in a fifty-five-page document entitled "The Potential Uses of Television in Preschool Education". The report, which Gikow called "a schematic for the show Sesame Street would become," described what the new show would look like and proposed the creation of a company that oversaw its production, which eventually became known as the Children's Television Workshop (CTW). (Note: In 2000, the CTW changed its name to Sesame Workshop (SW).) Cooney later stated that her undergraduate training in Education helped her research and write the study, and that it, along with her Emmy, provided her with credibility in the eyes of both the experts she interviewed and the new show's funding sources. Davis credited Cooney's motivation to be involved with the project with her journalism skills, learned early in her career, and her idealism, which drove her to want to, as she put it, "make a difference". She later told an interviewer, "I could do a thousand documentaries on poverty and poor people that would be watched by a handful of the convinced, but I was never really going to have an influence on my times." She later told Davis, "Preschoolers were not necessarily my thing. It was using television in a constructive way that turned me on."

At first, Cooney assumed that the project would be produced by WNDT, but when the station's owner rejected the proposal and questioned Cooney's credentials, she left the station and went to the Carnegie Corporation as a full-time consultant in May 1967. For the next two years, Cooney and Morrisett worked on researching and developing the new show, raising $8 million for Sesame Street, and establishing the CTW. According to Davis, despite her leadership in the project's initial research and development, Cooney's installment as CTW's executive director was put in doubt due to her lack of high-level managerial experience and leadership, untested financial management skills, and lack of experience in children's television and education. Davis also speculated that sexism was involved, stating, "Doubters also questioned whether a woman could gain the full confidence of a quorum of men from the federal government and two elite philanthropies, institutions whose wealth exceeded the gross national product of entire countries." At first, Cooney did not fight for the position, but with the support of her husband and Morrisett, and after the investors of the project realized that they could not move forward without her, Cooney pursued it and was named executive director of CTW in February 1968. As one of the first female executives in American television, her appointment was called "one of the most important television developments of the decade".

Sesame Street premiered on PBS on November 10, 1969. In its first season, the show won three Emmys, a Peabody, and was featured on the cover of Time magazine. According to Newsday, "Scores of glowing newspaper and magazine stories fluttered down on Mrs. Cooney and her workshop like confetti onto the heads of conquering heroes." Les Brown of Variety called Cooney "St. Joan". Cooney later reported, "The reception was so incredible. The press adored us; the parents adored us." The first year Sesame Street was on the air, Cooney was, as Davis put it, "inundated with attention". Cooney reported that the requests for interviews from the press "were endless" and attributed it to the emergence of the women's movement in the early 1970s. Cooney also testified before Congressional hearings on children and television, starting before the show's premiere.

In 1969, the Cooneys, who were childless, became "de facto foster parents to an inner-city black child" whom Tim met while working in Harlem for a civil rights organization. Eventually, the child returned to live with his mother and was killed in New York City before he turned 30. The Cooneys' marriage, which Davis called "turbulent," ended in 1975. Due to Tim's long history of alcoholism, he was unable to support himself, so Cooney paid him alimony until his death in 1999. In August 1975, nine months after separating from her husband, Cooney was diagnosed with breast cancer and underwent a radical mastectomy. In 1980, Cooney married businessman Peter G. "Pete" Peterson, former U.S. Secretary of Commerce under President Richard Nixon. They met when Peterson was on the board of National Educational Television, during her presentation of Sesame Street to them. They were married for 37 years, until his death in 2018. From her marriage to Peterson, she had five stepchildren and nine grandchildren.

== Later years ==
Cooney remained the chairwoman and chief executive officer of the CTW until 1990 when she stepped down and was replaced by David Britt, whom Cooney called her "right-hand for many years". Britt had worked for her at the CTW since 1975 and had been its president and chief operating officer since 1988. At that time, she became chairman of the CTW's executive board, which oversaw its businesses and licensing, and became more involved in the organization's creative side.

Cooney served on several committees and corporate boards, including the Mayo Foundation, Chase Manhattan Bank, Johnson & Johnson, and Metropolitan Life Insurance. Cooney recognized that she was invited to serve on these boards because she was a woman and because companies were trying to be more inclusive. She also did some public speaking on the behalf of the CTW and returning to her roots, worked on documentaries. She credited her involvement with the boards with teaching her how to run an organization and about the business world. In 2007, Sesame Workshop founded The Joan Ganz Cooney Center, an independent, non-profit organization which studies how to improve children's literacy by using and developing digital technologies "grounded in detailed educational curriculum," just as was done during the development of Sesame Street. In 2014, Public Prep launched a full day pre-kindergarten program for low-income four-year-olds living in South Bronx NYC Housing Authority projects, called the Joan Ganz Cooney Early Learning Program.

== Honors ==
Unless otherwise noted, entries from Cooney's entry in Encyclopedia of Television (2013).

- Christopher Medal, 1970
- National Institute for Social Sciences Gold Medal, 1971
- Frederick Douglass Award, New York Urban League, 1972
- Silver Satellite Award, American Women in Radio and TV, 1979
- Woman of the Decade Award, 1979
- National Endowment for the Arts, Friends of Education Award, 1981
- Kiwanis Decency Award, 1981
- National Association of Educational Broadcasters Distinguished Service Award, 1981
- Stephen S. Wise Award, 1981
- Harris Foundation Award, 1982
- Emmy Award, for Lifetime Achievement, 1989
- Academy of Television Arts and Sciences Hall of Fame, 1989
- University of Arizona Centennial Medallion Award, 1989
- Presidential Medal of Freedom, 1995
- 10th Anniversary Award, National Alliance of Breast Cancer Organizations, 1996
- National Women's Hall of Fame, 1998
- National Endowment for the Humanities Award, 2003
- National Humanities Medal, 2004
- Literarian Award of the National Book Award, 2010
- Honoree, Annual Sesame Workshop Benefit Gala, 2014
- International Broadcasting Convention's International Honor for Excellence; first woman to receive award, 2018

Board of directors

- Director, Johnson & Johnson
- Director, Metropolitan Life Insurance Company
- National Commission on Marihuana and Drug Abuse, 1971–73
- National News Council, 1973–81
- Council Foreign Relations, 1974–present
- Advisory Committee for Trade Negotiations, 1978–80
- Governor's Commission on International Year of the Child, 1979
- President's Commission for Agenda for the 1980s, 1980–81
- Carnegie Foundation National Panel on High Schools, 1980–82
- National Organization for Women (NOW)
- National Academy of Television Arts and Sciences
- National Institute Social Sciences
- International Radio and TV Society
- American Women in Radio and TV

Trustee

- WNET (Channel 13)
- Emeritus, Museum of Television & Radio (Paley Center)
- Allegheny College
- Columbia Presbyterian Hospital
- National Child Labor Committee

Honorary degrees

- Boston College, 1970
- Hofstra University, 1970
- Ohio Wesleyan University, 1971
- Oberlin College, 1972
- Princeton University, 1973
- Russell Sage College, 1974
- University of Arizona, 1975, 1989
- Harvard University, 1975
- Allegheny College, 1976
- Georgetown University, 1978
- University of Notre Dame, 1982
- Smith College, 1986
- Brown University, 1987
- Columbia University, 1991
- New York University, 1991
- University of Pennsylvania, 2002
- Dartmouth College (Doctor of Arts), 2006
- Northwestern University (Doctor of Humane Letters), 2012
