= Roy H. Thorpe =

American politician (1874–1951)

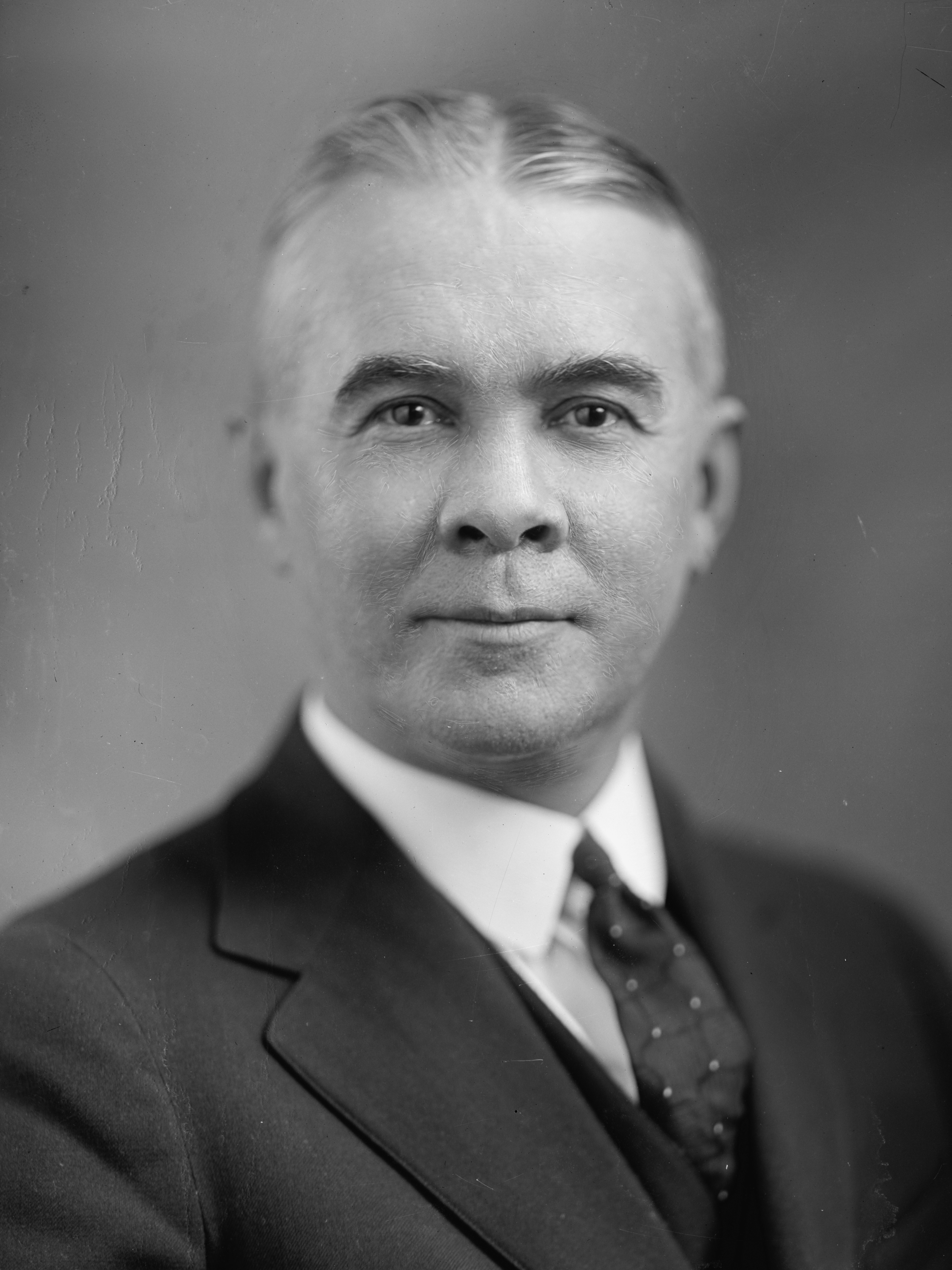

Member of the U.S. House of Representatives from Nebraska's 1st district
- In office November 7, 1922 – March 3, 1923
- Preceded by: C. Frank Reavis
- Succeeded by: John H. Morehead

Personal details
- Born: December 13, 1874 Greensburg, Indiana, US
- Died: September 19, 1951 (aged 76) Lincoln, Nebraska, US
- Resting place: Wyuka Cemetery
- Party: Republican

Roy Henry Thorpe (December 13, 1874 – September 19, 1951) was an American salesman and Republican Party politician.

== Early life and education ==
He was born near Greensburg, Indiana, on December 13, 1874, and graduated from Greensburg High School. He studied pharmacy, medicine, and law.

== Career ==
As an evangelist, Thorpe was known as "the boy tramp orator of 1896". He worked as a salesman in Du Quoin, Illinois, from 1897 to 1904 and in Shenandoah, Iowa, from 1905 to 1919.

In 1919, Thorpe moved to Lincoln, Nebraska, still working as a salesman. On November 7, 1922, he was elected to the Sixty-seventh United States Congress to fill the seat left open by C. Frank Reavis who resigned to become a special war fraud prosecutor. He did not seek reelection in 1922, but attempted a comeback in 1924 but was defeated by John H. Morehead. He traveled as a sales organizer and later engaged in the insurance business.

== Death ==
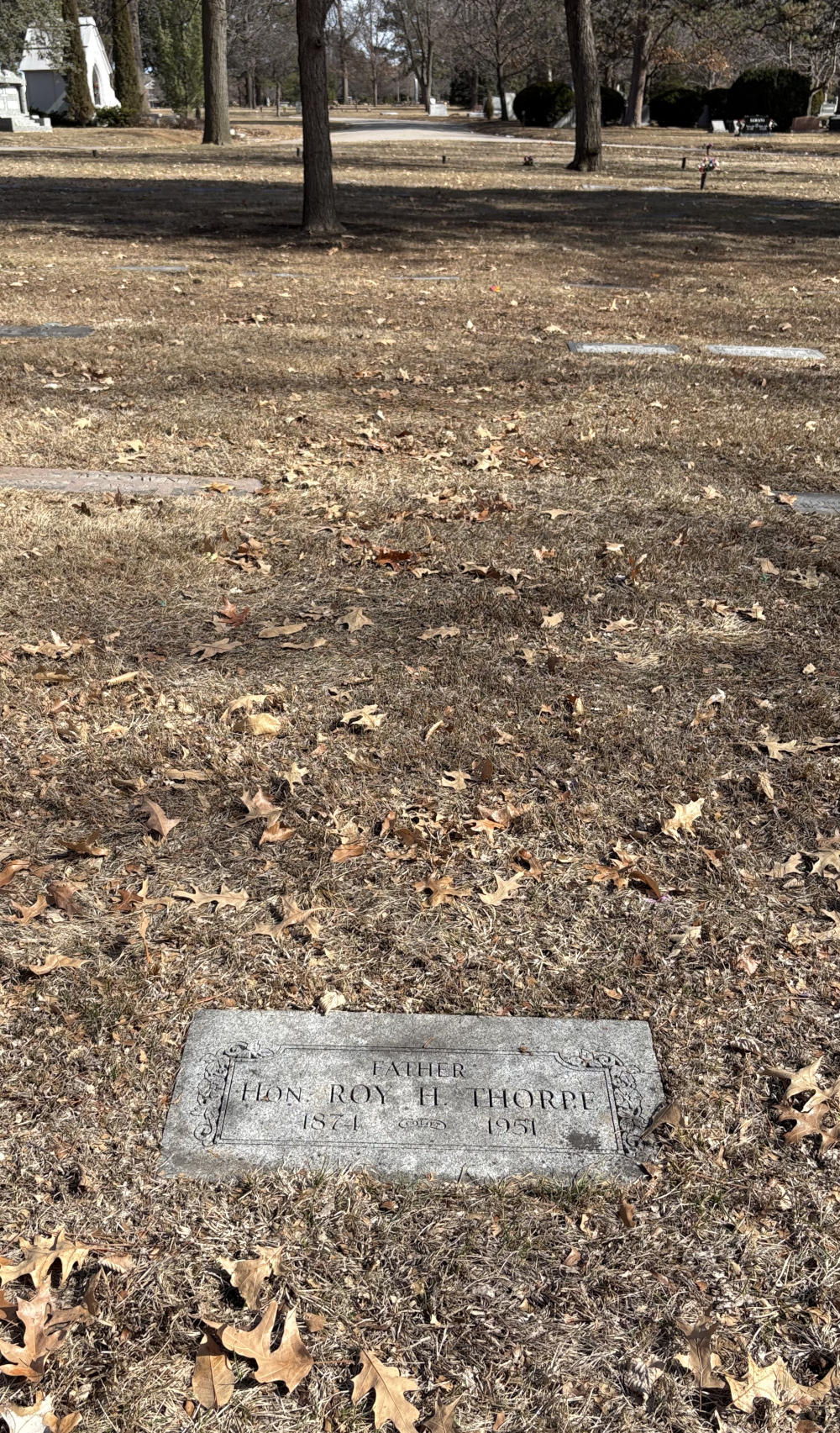
Thorpe's grave at Wyuka Cemetery

He died in Lincoln on September 19, 1951, and is interred in Wyuka Cemetery.

U.S. House of Representatives
Preceded by C. Frank Reavis (R)	Member of the U.S. House of Representatives from Nebraska's 1st congressional district November 7, 1922 – March 3, 1923	Succeeded by John H. Morehead (D)
