= C. Frank Reavis =

American politician (1870–1932)

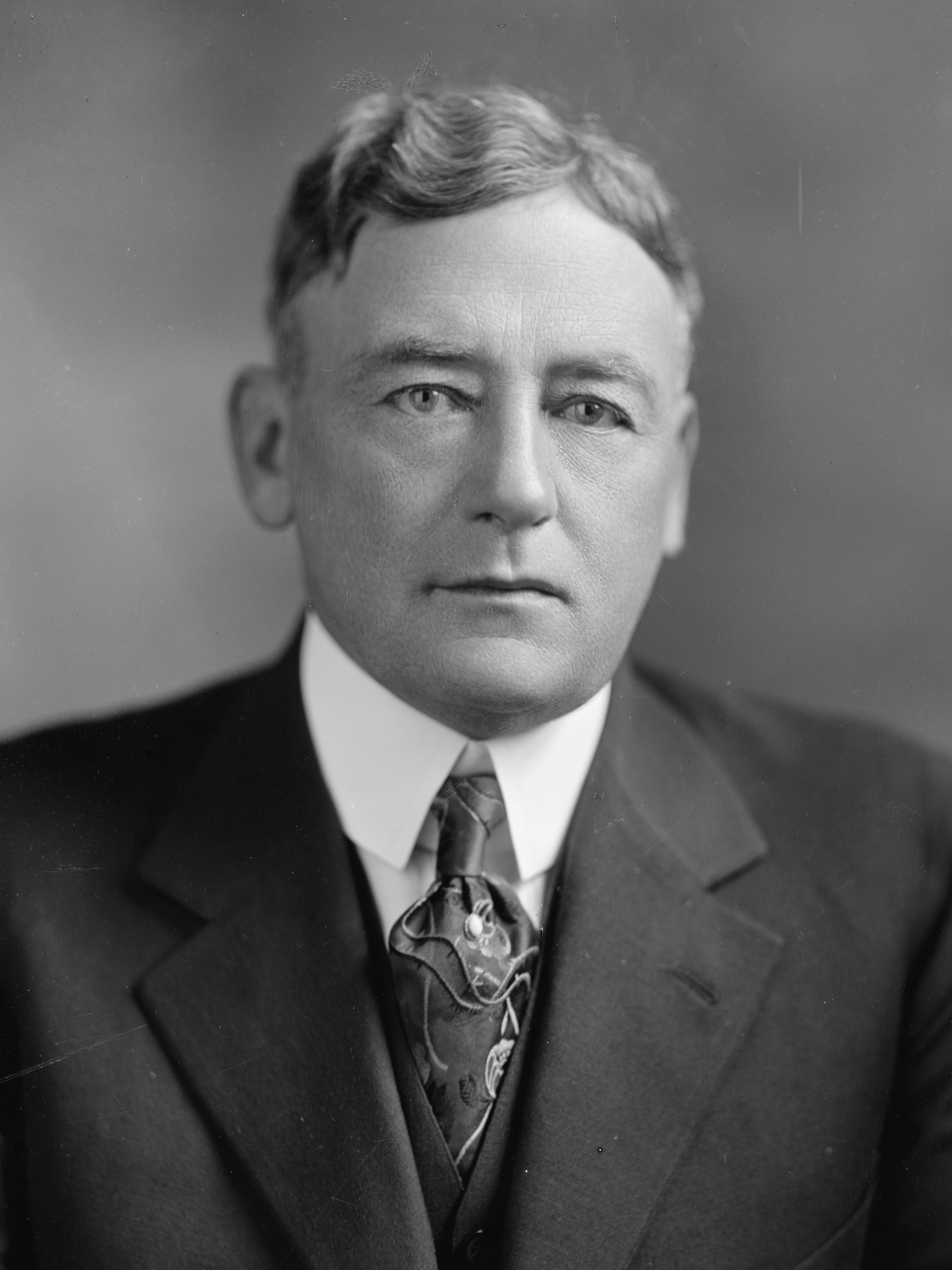

Member of the U.S. House of Representatives from Nebraska's 1st district
- In office March 4, 1915 – June 3, 1922
- Preceded by: John A. Maguire
- Succeeded by: Roy H. Thorpe

Personal details
- Born: Charles Frank Reavis; September 5, 1870 Falls City, Nebraska, U.S.
- Died: May 26, 1932 (aged 61) Lincoln, Nebraska, U.S.
- Party: Republican
- Relatives: Isham Reavis (father); Joseph C. Reavis (nephew)
- Education: Northwestern University

Charles Frank Reavis (September 5, 1870 – May 26, 1932) was an American Republican Party politician.

He was born in Falls City, Nebraska on and studied law at Northwestern University in Evanston, Illinois. He was admitted to the bar in 1892 and set up practice in Falls City. He became the prosecuting attorney of Richardson County, Nebraska from 1894 to 1896.

In 1915 he was elected to the 64th United States Congress and reelected to the three succeeding congresses serving from March 4, 1915, to June 3, 1922. On April 5, 1917, he voted against declaring war on Germany. He resigned in 1922 and was appointed in June 1922 special assistant to the United States Attorney General in the prosecution of war fraud cases. He served until June 1, 1924. He moved to Lincoln, Nebraska in 1924 and continued the practice of law. He died there on May 26, 1932, and is buried in Steele Cemetery in Falls City.

U.S. House of Representatives
Preceded by John A. Maguire (D)	Member of the U.S. House of Representatives from Nebraska's 1st congressional district March 4, 1915 – June 3, 1922	Succeeded by Roy H. Thorpe (R)
