= DeForest Porter =

American jurist and politician (1840–1889)

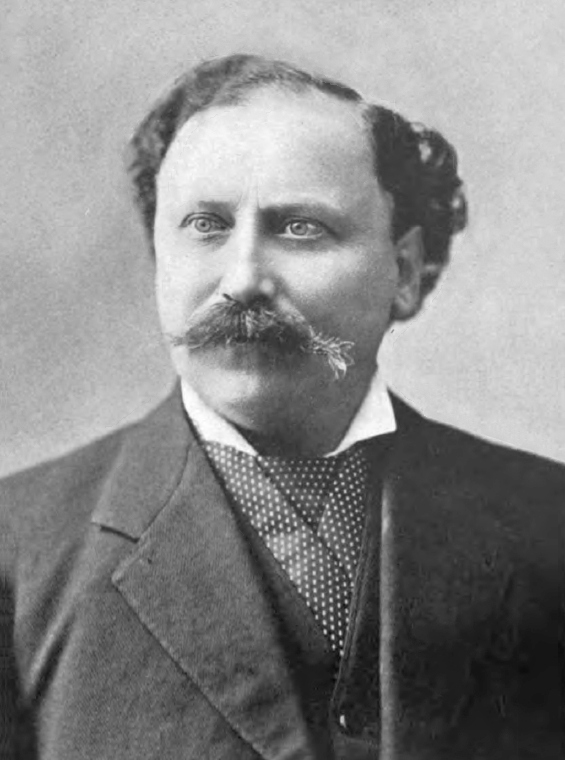

Associate Justice, Arizona Territorial Supreme Court
- In office April 12, 1872 – June 7, 1882
- Nominated by: Ulysses S. Grant; Rutherford B. Hayes
- Preceded by: Isham Reavis
- Succeeded by: Daniel H. Pinney

3rd and 6th Mayor of Phoenix
- In office 1883–1884
- Preceded by: Francis A. Shaw
- Succeeded by: George F. Coats
- In office 1886–1888
- Preceded by: Emil Ganz
- Succeeded by: A. Leonard Meyer

Personal details
- Born: February 2, 1840 Orleans County, New York
- Died: February 17, 1889 (aged 49) Phoenix, Arizona Territory
- Party: Republican
- Spouse(s): Julia Sophia Trowbridge (1849–1878); Lois Gertrude Cotten (1880 – )
- Profession: Attorney

DeForest Porter (February 2, 1840 (Note: Some sources list Porter's birth in 1841. His tombstone in contrast gives his year of birth as 1839.) – February 17, 1889) was an American jurist and politician who served as Associate Justice of the Arizona Territorial Supreme Court from 1872 till 1882 and as Mayor of Phoenix, Arizona Territory from 1886 till 1888.

== Early life ==
Porter was born February 2, 1840, in Orleans County, New York, and raised in the town of Albion. The ninth of nine children, he was educated in public schools and the Alviam Academy before enrolling at St. Lawrence University. Porter graduated from the university's theology school in 1861. While still in school he actively campaigned throughout New York for Abraham Lincoln's 1860 presidential run.

Following graduation, Porter reportedly was ordained as a Unitarian minister. Instead of pursuing a career as a clergyman, he instead apprenticed himself at the law office of Sanford E. Church and Noah Davis. Details of the next few years are unclear with most accounts indicating he was admitted to the bar in 1862 and Porter being wounded at the Battle of Gettysburg during his service in the Union army. In 1865, shortly after the American Civil War ended, Porter married Julia Sophia Trowbridge. The marriage produced a son and they adopted a daughter.

Following the wedding, Porter and his wife lived in Plattsmouth, Nebraska, for a short time before settling in Brownville, Nebraska. There he established a legal practice and served as assessor, city attorney, and county attorney. In December 1870 Porter won a special election for a seat in the Nebraska House of Representatives. During his term of office he was active in the impeachment of governor David Butler.

== Associate Justice ==
President Ulysses S. Grant nominated Porter to become an Associate Justice of the Arizona Territorial Supreme Court on February 20, 1872. He received Senate confirmation three days later and arrived in Arizona City (now Yuma, Arizona) to take his oath of office of April 12. Within days of his arrival he held his first court session. At the end of his session he visited the Mohave County seat in Hardyville. During the trip he was flabbergasted by the climate and complained to United States Attorney General George Henry Williams that temperatures reached 114 °F (46 °C).

Only two of Porter's opinions survive. One of these, Graves v. Alsap, 1 Arizona 275 (1875), deals with the legality of a veto override. The U.S. Congress had passed legislation authorizing the territorial legislature to override a veto with a two-thirds vote. The judge then ruled on whether veto made about the same time as this change was made could be overridden.

On February 28, 1876, Porter was recommissioned for a second term. The next year, when Maricopa County was added to his judicial district, he moved from Yuma to Phoenix. Porter's first wife died in 1878. He married Lois Gertrude Cotten of Phoenix in 1880. His second marriage produced one daughter.

Porter was commissioned for a third term on November 2, 1880. During his years on the bench he suffered from heart problems that were aggravated by the region's summer heat. Regardless of these problems he was noted as a hard worker. He did not complete his third term as on June 7, 1882, Porter submitted his resignation.

== Later life ==
During his time on the bench, Porter acquired extensive land holdings in downtown Phoenix along with mining properties throughout central Arizona. At the same time he and Charles Silent were active in encouraging Eastern venture capitalist's efforts to invest in the territory. In addition to his real estate holdings, Porter returned to the practice of law after leaving the bench.

By Porter's second term on the bench area residents were encouraging him to run for elected office. He turned down an opportunity to run for Territorial Delegate to Congress in 1878 due to the declining health of his first wife. Two years later he was a candidate for Territorial Delegate during Republican territorial convention but lost the party nomination to Madison W. Stewart. In 1882, Porter was the Republican nominee for Territorial Delegate. He however lost the general election to Granville Henderson Oury 6,121 to 5,141.

Porter was elected Mayor of Phoenix in 1883. Two years later he represented Maricopa County in the 13th Arizona Territorial Legislature. During the legislative session his "untiring energy and indomitable will" help ensure passage of legislation creating a territorial normal school, territorial insane asylum, and authorization of a railroad link between Phoenix and the Southern Pacific Railroad at Maricopa. The retired judge was elected to a second term as Mayor of Phoenix in 1887. This term saw the 15th Arizona Territorial Legislature move the territorial capital from Prescott to Phoenix. As the session's members traveled by Pullman coach to the new Capital, Mayor Porter helped pay for the entertainment and personally presented each of the legislators with a new silk hat.

Porter died on February 17, 1889, while recovering from a severe bout of erysipelas. He received a Masonic funeral prior to burial. He was later re-interred as Phoenix's Greenwood Memorial Park.
