= Isham Reavis =

American jurist (1936–1914)

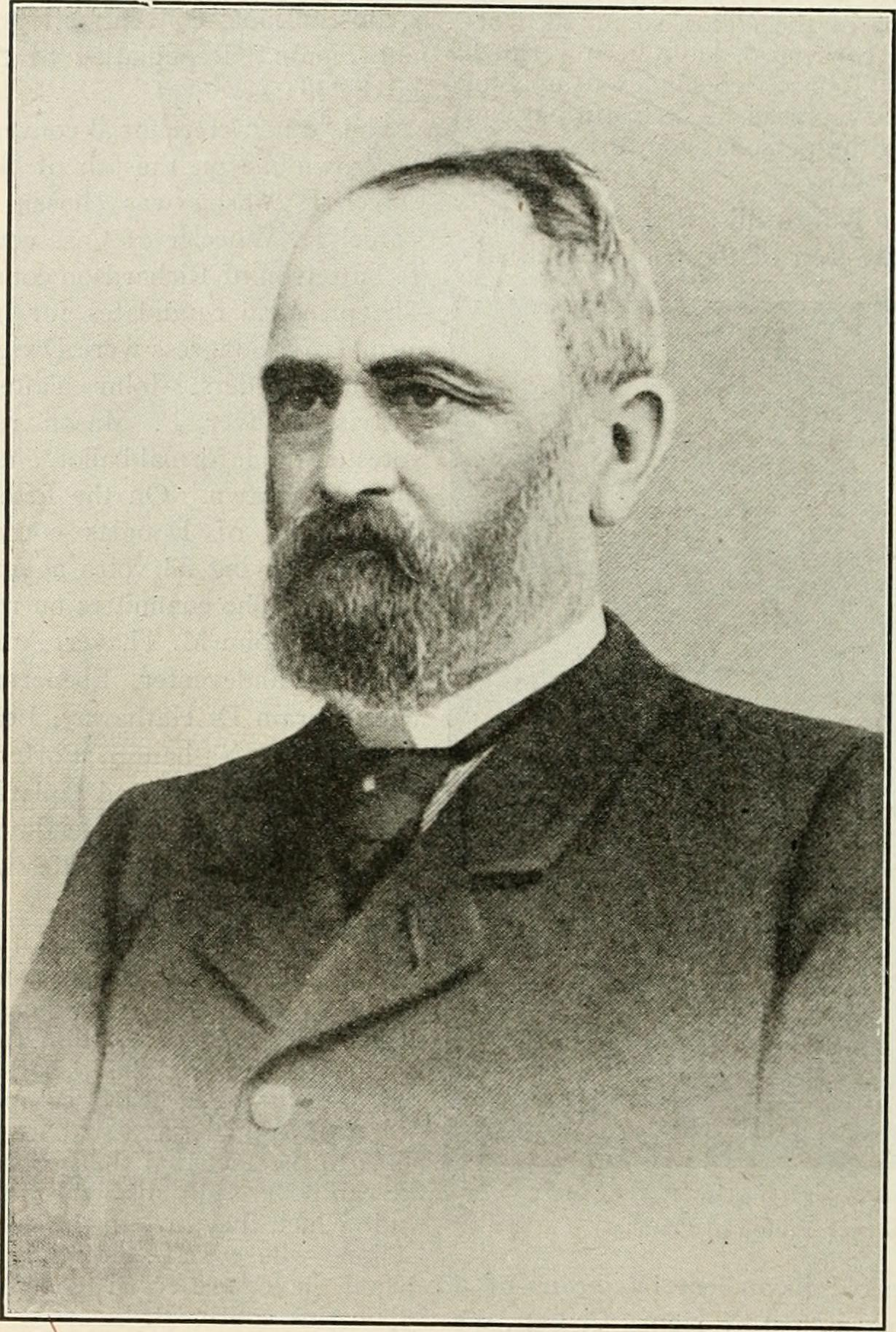

Associate Justice, Arizona Territorial Supreme Court
- In office August 29, 1869 – April 12, 1872
- Nominated by: Ulysses S. Grant
- Preceded by: Harley High Cartter
- Succeeded by: DeForest Porter

Personal details
- Born: January 28, 1836 Cass County, Illinois
- Died: May 8, 1914 (aged 78) Falls City, Nebraska
- Party: Republican
- Spouse: Anne Mariah Dorrington
- Relatives: C. Frank Reavis (son); Joseph C. Reavis (grandson)
- Profession: Attorney

Isham Reavis (January 28, 1836 – May 8, 1914) was an American jurist who served as an associate justice of the Supreme Court of Arizona Territory.

== Background ==
Reavis was born on a farm in Morgan County, Illinois (now in Cass County) to Isham and Mahala (Beck) Reavis on January 28, 1836. He was educated at schools in Beardstown and Virginia, Illinois. Reavis was enrolled for a time at Illinois College before the death of his mother forced him to leave school.

In August 1855, Reavis went to work at a law office in Beardstown and began reading law. He sent a request to his father's friend, Abraham Lincoln, asking the Illinois lawyer oversee his studies but was informed that Lincoln's schedule did not allow him to take an apprentice at the time. He was admitted to the bar in 1857 and, after practicing law for a short time in Illinois, moved to Falls City, Nebraska, in May 1858 where he opened a private law practice.

Reavis married Anne Mariah Dorrington on May 19, 1864. Four of the couple's five children survived to adulthood: Annie M, David D., C. Frank, and Burton.

When Nebraska achieved statehood in 1867, Reavis was appointed to a two-year term as district attorney for the 1st judicial district. This was followed by his election to the Nebraska state senate in 1868. When Ulysses S. Grant was inaugurated in 1869, Reavis wrote to him requesting appointment as a judge in Wyoming Territory. He was instead nominated for a bench on the Arizona Territorial Supreme Court and confirmed by the U.S. Senate on April 20, 1869.

The new judge left Nebraska in August 1869, taking the newly completed Transcontinental Railroad to California before boarding a ship south to the mouth of the Colorado River. From there he proceeded north to La Paz, Arizona Territory, and took his oath of office on August 29, 1869. Reavis lived in La Paz till early 1871 when seat for the second judicial district was moved to Yuma. His wife and family, who had remained in Nebraska, joined him in Yuma.

Most of Justices Reavis' opinions have been lost over time. Two exceptions are his ruling in Territory of Arizona v. Milton B. Duffield, one of the legal proceedings against the territory's first U.S. Marshal, and his dissenting opinion in United States v. Certain Property and William Bichard and Company, which dealt with the Federal government's ability to regulate commerce outside Indian reservations. Reavis submitted his resignation on December 1, 1871, and remained on the bench till his replacement, DeForest Porter, was sworn in on April 12, 1872. At the time, the Miner in Prescott printed claims the judge had accepted bribes and was being removed from office. Documents in the National Archives and Records Administration however provide no evidence of anything other than a voluntary resignation.

After leaving the bench, Reavis opened a private law practice in Yuma. He remained there until May 1873 when he moved his family back to Falls City, Nebraska. There he operated a legal practice, being joined in the practice by his son C. Frank in 1902. Reavis died in his home on May 8, 1914, and was entombed in a family mausoleum in Steele Cemetery.
