= Elsbach & Frank =

Former department store in Hanover, Lower Saxony

Coordinates: 52°22′23″N 9°44′14″E

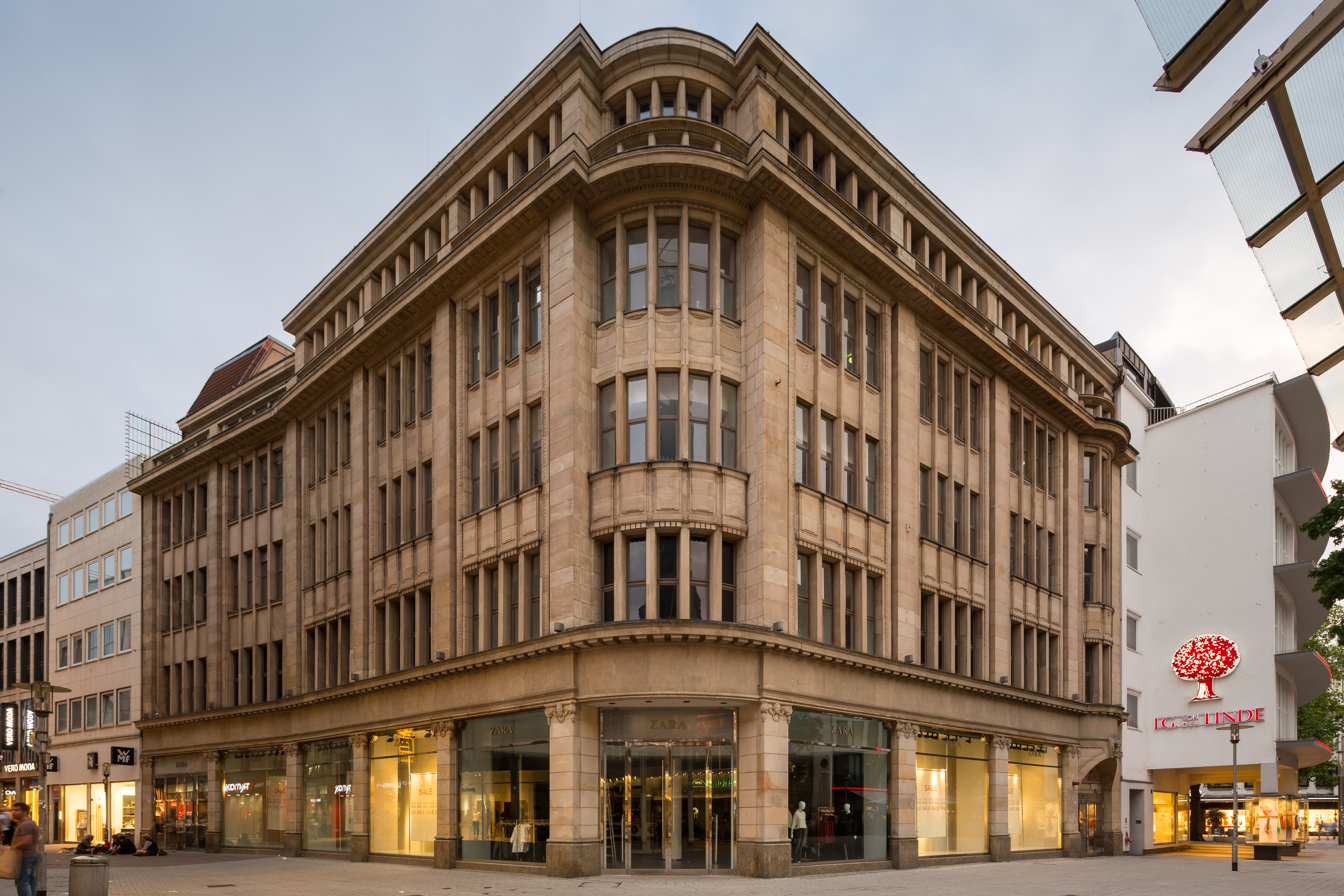
The former department store Zum Stern as a branch of the Zara clothing chain

Elsbach & Frank was a textile retail business founded in the 19th century in Hanover, the capital of Lower Saxony, Germany. The department store (Kaufhaus) built by the business on the corner of Osterstraße and Große Packhofstraße, called Zum Stern, is the only building in the city centre that survived the air raids on Hanover during the Second World War without major damage. Today, the building houses a branch of the Spanish fashion chain Zara.

== History ==
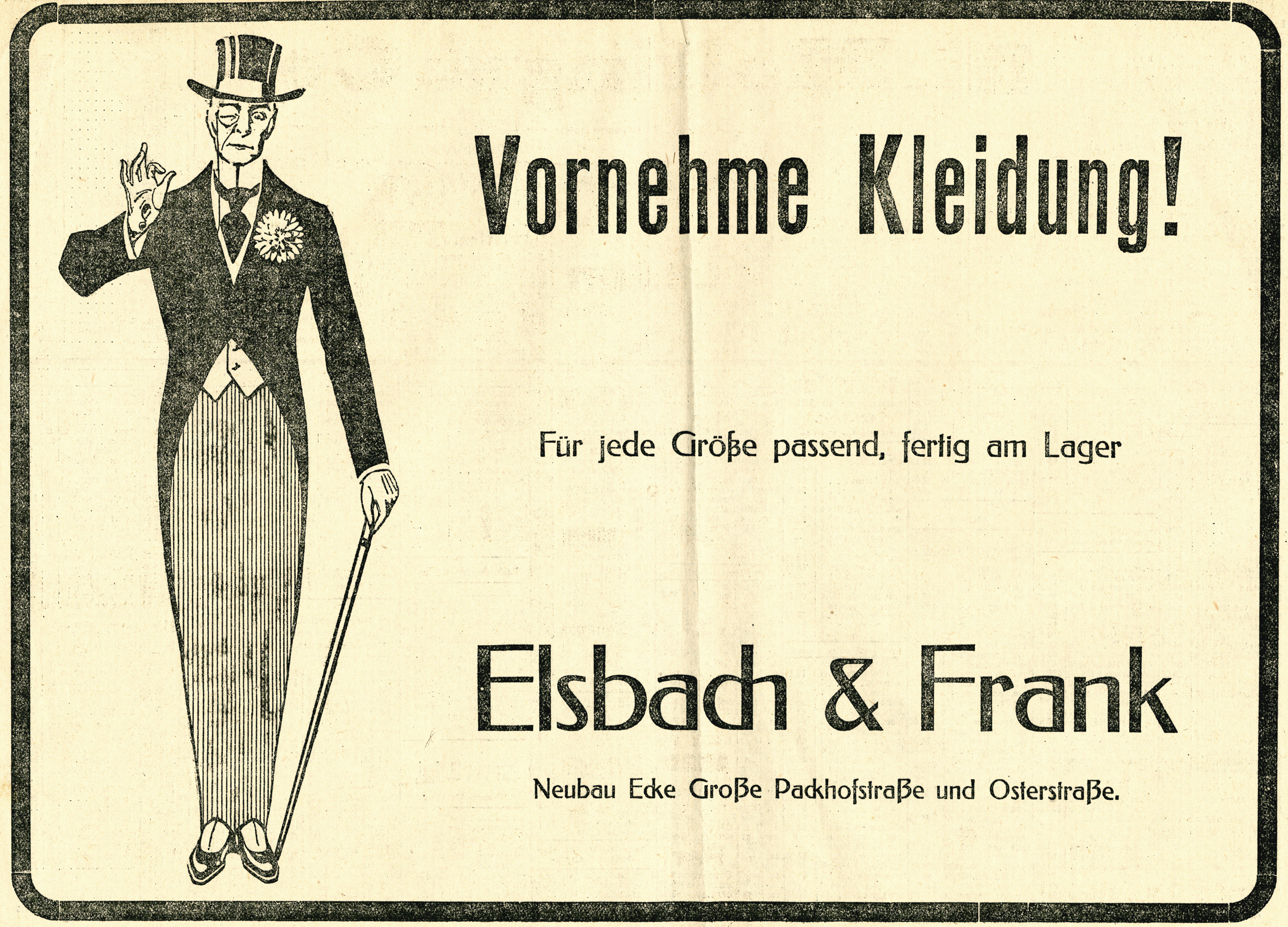
Advertisement noting the new building in the Hannoverscher Anzeiger of 1913

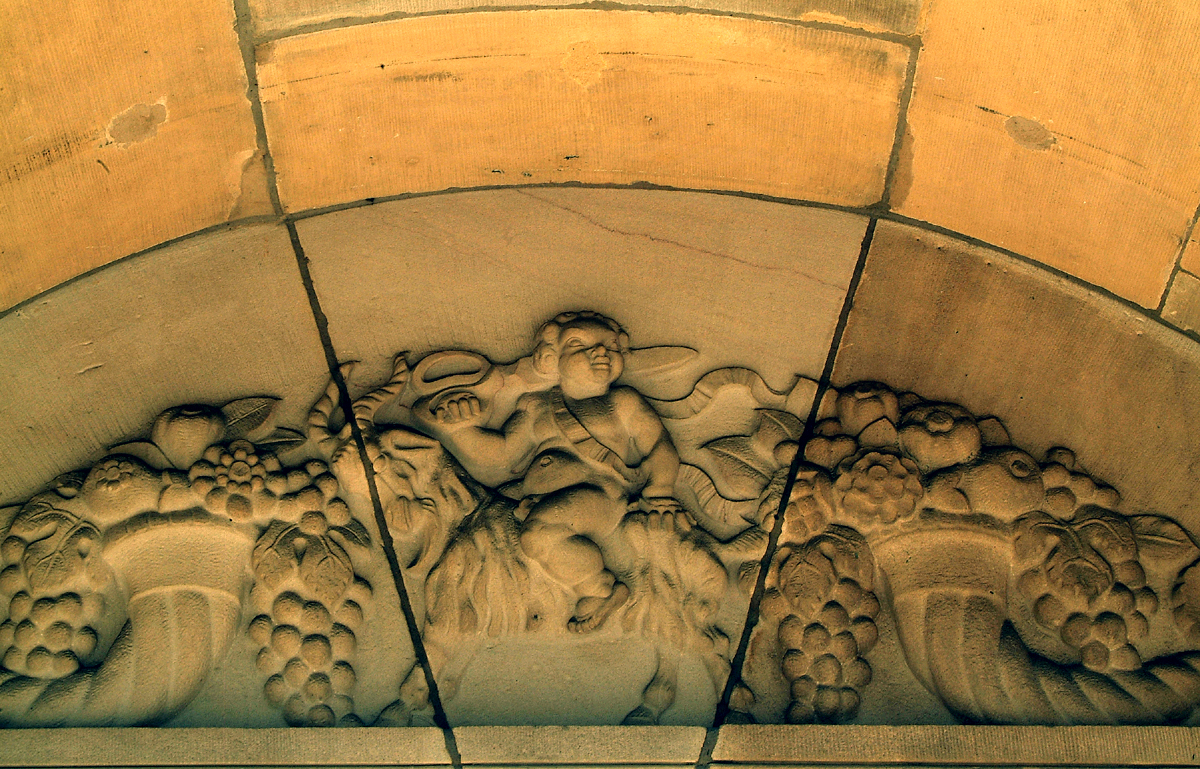
Relief decoration on the façade with reference to the tailoring workshop

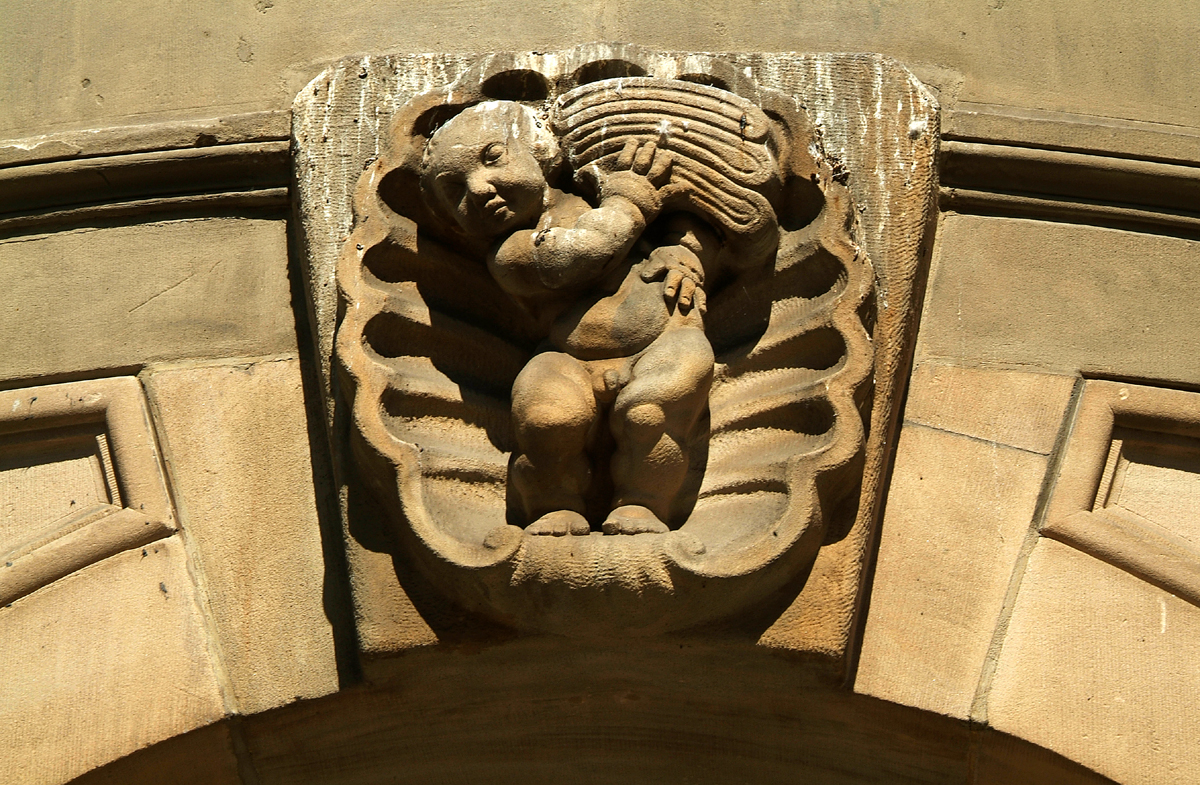
This fabric carrier lacks a bird guard

In 1889, the merchants Ferdinand Elsbach and Julius Frank founded their specialty store, initially only for men's and boys' clothing, some of which they had made in their own tailoring shop. The company expanded in 1910 when the managing director Josef Adamski founded a branch in Hildesheim. In 1910–1911, the architect Rudolf Friedrich built the new Zum Stern department store for the main store in Hanover, which was extended in 1931. While an advertising slogan of the business in 1913 was "what the young man, the man, the sportsman, the hunter and the tourist needs is on offer", this was later expanded to include women's clothing.

Around the time of Elsbach's death in 1931, their business began to experience financial difficulties due to antisemitism but almost surely also because of the Great Depression. In 1932 clothing retailer Otto Werner bought their building Zum Stern, and Adamski purchased the Hildesheim property in 1932 or 1933. In 1933 Elsbach & Frank also became subject to boycotts after the Nazis came to power in Germany.

Frank died in 1937 in Hanover, but Elbach's widow Ida was deported to the Theresienstadt Ghetto in 1942 where she died just 10 days later. (Note: Ferdinand's brother, Adolf, was also deported to Theresiendstadt where he died in 1943.) Their children were able to flee Nazi Germany. (Note: Historian Michael Pechel compiled the history of the Jewish department stores for the Netzwerk Erinnerung und Zukunft in der Region Hannover.) Adamski is still trading as of 2024.

== See also ==
- Aryanization
- Clothing industry
- Bekleidungshaus Otto Werner
- Elsbach (company)

== General references ==
- Hannoverscher Kurier, ed. (1913), Neu-Hannover: Festschrift des Hannoverschen Couriers zur Rathaus-Weihe (in German), p. 18, OCLC 1106592044, Wikidata Q123824642
- Heitmüller, August; Metzig, Wilhelm (1929). Hannoversche Köpfe aus Verwaltung, Wirtschaft, Kunst und Literatur. Hannover: Osterwald. OCLC 1708461.
- Röhrbein, Waldemar R. (2009), "Elsbach & Frank, 'Kaufhaus zum Stern'", in Klaus Mlynek; Waldemar R. Röhrbein (eds.), Hannover City Lexicon. From the beginnings into the present (in German), Hanover: Schlütersche Verlagsgesellschaft, p. 159, OCLC 458691668, OL 45212542M, Wikidata Q2327579
- Benne, Simon (6 May 2016). "Das Haus mit der runden Ecke – Eine Fassade mit Vergangenheit: Zara baut das frühere Otto-Werner-Gebäude im großen Stil um". Hannoversche Allgemeine Zeitung. p. 15.
