= Joseph C. Reavis =

American politician (1899–1957)

Member of the Nebraska Legislature from the 1st district
- In office January 5, 1943 – January 7, 1947
- Preceded by: Otto Kotouc Jr.
- Succeeded by: Harold Prichard
- In office January 3, 1939 – January 7, 1941
- Preceded by: Charles Dafoe
- Succeeded by: Otto Kotouc Jr.

Personal details
- Born: August 15, 1899 Falls City, Nebraska
- Died: January 2, 1957 (aged 57) Falls City, Nebraska
- Party: Republican
- Spouse: Florence Tyler (m. 1925)
- Children: 2
- Relatives: C. Frank Reavis (uncle); Isham Reavis (grandfather)
- Education: University of Nebraska (LL.B.)
- Occupation: Attorney

Joseph Carrol Reavis (August 15, 1899 – January 2, 1957) was a Republican politician from Nebraska who served as a member of the Nebraska Legislature from the 1st district from 1939 to 1941 and again from 1943 to 1947.

== Early life ==
Reavis was born in Falls City, Nebraska in 1899. His grandfather, Isham Reavis, was a member of the Nebraska State Senate and later served as an associate justice on the Arizona Territory Supreme Court, and his uncle, C. Frank Reavis, represented the state in Congress. He received his bachelor of laws degree from the University of Nebraska and practiced as an attorney in Falls City, serving as city attorney, and was elected to the Eastern Nebraska Public Power District.

== Nebraska Legislature ==
In 1938, Reavis was elected to the Nebraska Legislature from the 1st district, succeeding State Senator Charles Dafoe. Reavis originally filed for a second term in 1940, but instead ran for the U.S. House of Representatives from the 1st district, losing to Oren S. Copeland in the Republican primary.

In 1942, Reavis ran for the legislature again. After Kotouc declined to seek a second term, Reavis was elected unopposed. He was re-elected in 1944, and declined to seek another term in 1946.

== Death ==
Reavis died on January 2, 1957.
