= Charles Dafoe =

American politician (1901–1942)

Member of the Nebraska Legislature from the 1st district
- In office January 5, 1937 – January 3, 1939
- Preceded by: Position created
- Succeeded by: Joseph C. Reavis

Member of the Nebraska State Senate from the 1st district
- In office January 1, 1935 – January 5, 1937
- Preceded by: Fred Hawxby
- Succeeded by: Position abolished

Personal details
- Born: September 22, 1901 Tecumseh, Nebraska
- Died: October 15, 1942 (aged 41) near Chicago, Illinois
- Cause of death: Plane crash
- Party: Democratic
- Education: Nebraska Wesleyan University (A.B.); University of Nebraska (LL.B.)
- Occupation: Attorney

Military service
- Allegiance: United States
- Branch/service: United States Army Air Corps

Charles A. Dafoe (September 22, 1901 – October 15, 1942) was a Democratic politician from Nebraska who served in the Nebraska State Senate from 1935 to 1937 and as a member of the Nebraska Legislature from the 1st district from 1937 to 1939. While serving in the United States Army Air Corps during World War II, he died in a plane crash near Chicago in 1942.

Dafoe was born in Tecumseh, Nebraska, in 1901. He graduated from Nebraska Wesleyan University and received his bachelor of laws degree from the University of Nebraska. After graduating, Dafoe practiced in Tecumseh, where he served as city attorney and as Johnson County attorney.

In 1934, Dafoe was elected to the Nebraska Senate from the 1st district as a Democrat, succeeding Fred Hawxby, who was appointed an assistant United States Attorney. After the Senate and House of Representatives were abolished to create the nonpartisan unicameral legislature, Dafoe was elected in the newly created 1st district in 1936, defeating Charles Vogt Jr. He declined to seek re-election in 1938, and while he considered running for the Nebraska Supreme Court, he ultimately declined to do so and returned to private practice.

Dafoe enlisted in the United States Army Air Corps on August 7, 1942, and was stationed in Sedalia, Missouri. On October 15, 1942, he was killed in a plane crash near Chicago.
