= Charles Vogt Jr. =

American politician (1908–1975)

Member of the Nebraska Legislature from the 1st district
- In office January 4, 1949 – January 2, 1951
- Preceded by: Harold Prichard
- Succeeded by: Otto Kotouc Sr.

Member of the Nebraska House of Representatives from the 2nd district
- In office January 1, 1935 – January 5, 1937
- Preceded by: Fred H. Barclay
- Succeeded by: Position abolished

Personal details
- Born: January 1, 1908 Orrick, Missouri
- Died: February 1, 1975 (aged 67) Lincoln, Nebraska
- Party: Republican
- Education: University of Nebraska

Military service
- Allegiance: United States
- Branch/service: United States Army
- Unit: 2nd Infantry Division

Charles Vogt Jr. (January 1, 1908 – February 1, 1975) was a Republican politician from Nebraska who served as a member of the Nebraska House of Representatives from the 2nd district from 1935 to 1937 and as a member of the Nebraska Legislature from the 1st district from 1949 to 1951.

== Early life ==
Vogt was born in Orrick, Missouri, in 1908, and moved to Nebraska in 1919. He graduated from Pawnee City High School and the University of Nebraska. Vogt served in the United States Army during World War II.

== Nebraska House of Representatives ==
In 1934, Vogt ran for the Nebraska House of Representatives from the 2nd district. He won the Republican nomination, and narrowly defeated incumbent Democrat Fred H. Barclay in the general election. After both chambers of the existing legislature were abolished, Vogt ran for the nonpartisan Nebraska Legislature from the 1st district, and was defeated by fellow State Representative Charles Dafoe.

Vogt unsuccessfully sought the Republican nominee for Pawnee County Clerk of the District Court in 1938, and for County Commission in 1946.

== Nebraska Legislature ==
In 1948, Vogt challenged State Senator Harold Prichard for re-election, and narrowly defeated him in the general election, winning 54 percent of the vote in the general election. He declined to seek re-election in 1950.

== Post-legislative career ==
Vogt challenged Railway Commissioner Richard Larson for re-election in the Republican primary in 1954. He lost the nomination in a landslide, winning 27 percent of the vote to Larson's 59 percent and C. Dixie Wilcox's 14 percent. In 1956, Vogt ran for the Railway Commission again, challenging appointed Commissioner Paul Pettygrove in the primary. He came in fourth place, winning 15 percent of the vote.

In 1958, Vogt challenged Commissioner Joseph Brown for re-election, and placed a distant eighth in an eleven-candidate primary. He ran against incumbent Clarence Swanson for a seat on the University of Nebraska Board of Regents in 1960, and lost by a wide margin.

== Death ==
Vogt died on February 1, 1975.
