= Emil Ganz =

German-American businessman and politician (1838–1922)

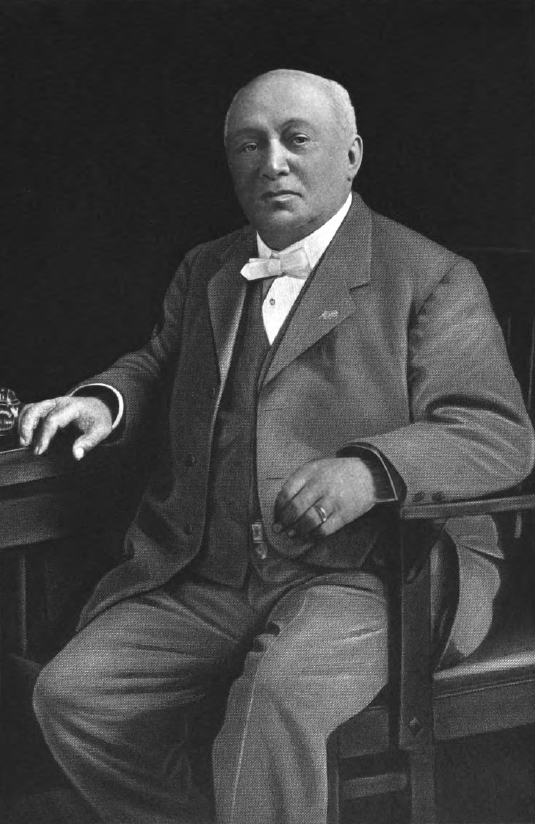
- Ganz in 1915

5th and 19th Mayor of Phoenix
- In office 1885–1886
- Preceded by: George F. Coats
- Succeeded by: DeForest Porter
- In office 1899–1901
- Preceded by: Czar James Dyer
- Succeeded by: Walter Talbot

Personal details
- Born: August 18, 1838 Walldorf, Thuringia
- Died: August 6, 1922 (aged 83) San Diego, California, US
- Spouse(s): Bertha Ganz (died 1905) Elsie Bryson (m. 1907)
- Relatives: Joan Ganz Cooney (granddaughter)
- Occupation: businessman and mayor of Phoenix, Arizona

Emil Ganz (August 18, 1838 – August 6, 1922) was a German-born American businessman and two-time mayor of Phoenix, Arizona.

== Early life ==
Ganz was born on August 18, 1838, in the German town of Walldorf, Duchy of Saxe-Meiningen, to Jewish parents Meyer and Hannah Ganz. He was educated in his home country before being apprenticed to a tailor at age 14. Ganz immigrated to the United States in 1858, working as a journeyman tailor in New York City and Philadelphia before settling in Cedartown, Georgia.

At the beginning of the American Civil War, Ganz enlisted in the Confederate States Army. As a soldier, he saw action at the battles of Antietam, Fredericksburg, Gettysburg, and well as being assigned to the defense of Richmond, Virginia. Toward the end of the war, he was captured and spent seven months as a prisoner of war at Elmira Prison.

== Career ==
Becoming a naturalized U.S. citizen in 1866, Ganz moved to Kansas City, Missouri. He joined other cousins who operated a clothing and dry goods company and made alterations to ready made clothing. In 1872, Ganz moved to Las Animas, Colorado, where he continued to work as a tailor. There he married a Catholic woman named Elizabeth. Two years later he relocated to Prescott, Arizona Territory and become manager of a hotel. In May 1876, he was granted a divorce from his wife. Ganz moved to Phoenix in 1879 and became proprietor for the Bank Exchange hotel. The hotel was destroyed by fire in 1885, after which Ganz went into the wholesale liquor business. Ganz married Bertha Angleman of Kansas City, Missouri in 1883. The union produced four children: Sylvan C., Julian, Aileen, and Helen.

Politically, Ganz was a member of the Democratic party. He was elected Mayor of Phoenix in 1885. As mayor, he lobbied for creation of a city fire department. He was initially unsuccessful but a fire in August 1886 convinced the voters to pass a bond issue to improve water supply and purchase fire fighting equipment.

In 1894, Ganz sold his liquor business. The next year he purchased an interest in the National Bank of Arizona and was elected the bank president. He returned to politics in 1896 and was unanimously elected to represent the second ward on the city council. In 1899, Ganz was elected to his first of two consecutive terms as city mayor. He was the Democratic nominee for mayor in 1903 but failed to win reelection.

== Personal life ==
Ganz's wife, Bertha, died on March 20, 1905. Ganz married Elsie Bryson on September 12, 1907. He stepped down as president of the National Bank of Arizona in January 1920 and became chairman of the bank's board. Ganz died in a San Diego, California, hospital on August 6, 1922.

In 2001, Mark Pry wrote a biography of Ganz, Immigrant Banker: The Life of Emil Ganz. The book was commissioned by granddaughter Joan Ganz Cooney, a television producer who co-created the PBS children's series Sesame Street.
