= Harley High Cartter =

American jurist and politician (1810–1874)

Associate Justice, Arizona Territorial Supreme Court
- In office July 1867 – August 29, 1869
- Nominated by: Andrew Johnson
- Preceded by: Joseph P. Allyn
- Succeeded by: Isham Reavis

Personal details
- Born: March 23, 1810 Lowville (town), New York
- Died: September 17, 1874 (aged 64) Prescott, Arizona Territory
- Party: Democratic
- Spouse: Jane Louisa Scranton
- Profession: Attorney

Harley High Cartter Sr. (March 23, 1810 – September 17, 1874), born Harlehigh Cartter, was an American jurist who served as Associate Justice of the Supreme Court of Arizona Territory and President of the council during the 6th Arizona Territorial Legislature.

== Biography ==
Cartter was born in Lowville (town), New York, on March 23, 1810, to David Kellog and Elizabeth (Hollister) Cartter. Ohio Congressman David Kellogg Cartter was his brother. He was living in Macomb County, Michigan, where he served as justice of the peace. On September 14, 1834, Cartter married Jane Louisa Scranton. The couple had seven children.

In 1837, Cartter was admitted to the bar. He was elected to a two-year term as Macomb County district attorney beginning in 1842, the same year he moved to Mount Clemens, Michigan. Cartter was twice elected to the Michigan House of Representatives, serving in 1845 and 1850.

Cartter was nominated by President Andrew Johnson to replace Joseph P. Allyn in early 1867. Despite being a dyed-in-the-wool Jacksonian, he was confirmed by a Republican controlled Senate. The new judge set sail from New York City with his son, Harley High Jr., and crossed Nicaragua before reaching San Francisco in mid-July. He finally reached La Paz, Arizona Territory in September. Upon assuming his new office, he changed his name from "Harlehigh" to "Harley High".

After reaching his new home, Catter proceeded to Prescott to attend the October 5, 1867, session of the territorial supreme court. After meeting him, the Arizona Miner described him as "a fine old gentleman, an able lawyer, and a sound Democrat". The new judge was an outspoken supporter of developing Arizona's natural resources. Threats from the indigenous population were the primary obstacle to developing the resources and Cartter felt the Federal government was dedicating too much effort with Reconstruction at the expense of the American West. He did feel that better times would soon be at hand as he predicted a Democratic victory during the 1868 U.S. presidential election.

Following a Republican victory in 1868, Ulysses S. Grant replaced Cartter with a candidate more agreeable to the new president. After his replacement, Isham Reavis, was sworn in on August 29, 1869, he opened a private practice in La Paz. Newspaper notices for his practice stated, "Will attend to business in all the court of the Territory." Foreseeing the decline of La Paz's fortunes, he lived briefly in Ehrenberg before settling in Prescott in September 1870. Two years later, Cartter brought his son into his legal practice, forming the firm of "H.H. Cartter and Son."

In November 1870, Cartter was elected to the upper house of the 6th Arizona Territorial Legislature. During the session the Council President, Daniel H. Stickney, died and Cartter was selected to replace him.

Cartter died in Prescott on September 16, 1874, after suffering from paralysis. He was buried there in the Aztlan Lodge Masonic Cemetery where a Marker is located
