= Joseph P. Allyn =

American jurist and journalist (1833–1869)

Joseph Pratt Allyn

Associate Justice, Arizona Territorial Supreme Court
- In office December 29, 1863 – July 1867
- Nominated by: Abraham Lincoln
- Succeeded by: Harley High Cartter

Personal details
- Born: March 9, 1833 Hartford, Connecticut, U.S.
- Died: May 24, 1869 (aged 36) Paris, France
- Party: Republican
- Profession: Merchant / Journalist

Joseph Pratt Allyn (March 9, 1833 – May 24, 1869) was an American jurist and journalist who served as one of the original Associate Justices of the Supreme Court of Arizona Territory.

== Background ==
Allyn was born in Hartford, Connecticut, to Timothy Mather and Susan Ann (Pratt) Allyn on March 9, 1833. His family was wealthy and he was educated by private tutors due to chronic health problems. Upon reaching adulthood, Allyn went to work at a local wholesaling firm. His health problems soon reappeared and he took a tour of Europe in an attempt to recover.

In 1859 Allyn became a Congressional attaché, a position he held for two years. At the same time he served as a correspondent to the Hartford Evening Press. In 1863, probably upon the recommendation of U.S. Secretary of the Navy Gideon Welles, Allyn was appointed Associate Justice of the newly created Arizona Territory by President Abraham Lincoln. Following the death of Governor-delegate John A. Gurley, Allyn joined with Secretary Welles and Territorial Secretary Richard C. McCormick petitioning for Chief Justice John N. Goodwin to be made governor and that a new Chief Justice be appointed for the territory.

Allyn traveled with the governor's party to the newly formed territory, arriving in December 1863. Shortly after his arrival he began traveling throughout the new territory and used the experiences of his journey and explorations to write a series of articles. His discoveries were published by the Hartford Evening Press under the name "Putnam" between September 21, 1863, and November 9, 1866. When judicial districts were organized, Allyn was assigned the second district, composed of all of Arizona west of the 114th meridian west, and based in the town of La Paz.

The Associate Justice began showing political ambitions shortly after his arrival in La Paz. He used his position as featured speaker at La Paz's 1864 Fourth of July celebration to acquaint himself with the citizenry. Later that year when Chief Justice William F. Turner took a leave of absence, Allyn filled in for him at Prescott and used the opportunity to make the population of the capital aware of his capabilities. In September 1864, the Associate Justice ran to become Arizona Territory's congressional delegate. He placed second in a three-way race, receiving 381 votes to John N. Goodwin's 717 and Charles D. Poston's 206. Allyn then applied to replace Goodwin as territorial governor but did not receive the appointment.

Allyn considered creating a newspaper in La Paz, and traveled to San Francisco, California, in 1866 to buy a printing press. Instead of returning to Arizona he instead went home to Connecticut. As his four-year term as judge was set to expire he notified President Andrew Johnson by letter that he did not wish to be reappointed.

In July 1867, Allyn sailed to Europe for health reasons. There he visited Spain, Algiers, and Egypt before going to France in April 1869. Allyn died in Paris on May 24, 1869. His body was returned to the Connecticut and he was buried in Hartford's Spring Grove Cemetery.
