= Otto Kotouc Sr. =

American politician (1885–1973)

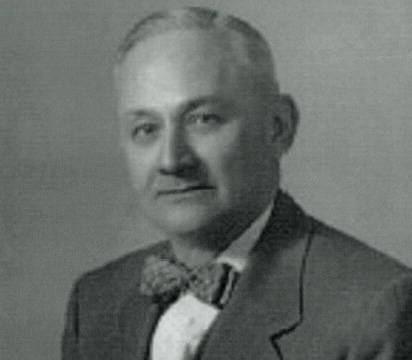

Member of the Nebraska Legislature from the 1st district
- In office January 2, 1951 – January 6, 1959
- Preceded by: Charles Vogt Jr.
- Succeeded by: John Cooper

Member of the Nebraska House of Representatives from the 1st district
- In office January 5, 1909 – January 7, 1913 Serving with R. A. Clark, Henry Gerdes, Charles Brecht
- Preceded by: Cass Jones, A. E. Stalder, J. F. Shubert
- Succeeded by: George H. Fallstead

Personal details
- Born: April 22, 1885 Humboldt, Nebraska
- Died: November 20, 1973 (aged 88) Humboldt, Nebraska
- Party: Democratic
- Spouse: Camille Cernik (m. 1912)
- Children: 2 (including Otto)
- Relatives: Otto Kotouc Jr. (son)
- Education: University of Nebraska
- Occupation: Banker

Otto Kotouc Sr. (April 22, 1885 – November 20, 1973) was a Democratic politician from Nebraska who served as a member of the Nebraska House of Representatives from the 1st district from 1909 to 1913 and as a member of the Nebraska Legislature from the 1st district from 1951 to 1959.

Kotouc was born in Humboldt, Nebraska, in 1885. He attended the University of Nebraska and worked as a banker.

In 1908, Kotouc was elected to the Nebraska House of Representatives was one of three representatives from the 1st district. He was re-elected in 1910, He did not seek re-election in 1912.

After leaving the legislature, Kotouc worked as a banker, and founded the Home State Bank in 1915. He served as president of the Nebraska Bankers Association in 1935.

In 1950, when State Senator Charles Vogt Jr. declined to seek re-election, Kotouc ran to succeed him in the 1st district. He was elected over former State Senator Harold Prichard in 1950, and was re-elected in 1952, 1954, and 1956. He declined to seek re-election in 1958.

Kotouc died on November 20, 1973.
