= Otto Kotouc Jr. =

American politician (1913–2000)

Member of the Nebraska Legislature from the 1st district
- In office January 7, 1941 – January 5, 1943
- Preceded by: Joseph C. Reavis
- Succeeded by: Joseph C. Reavis

Personal details
- Born: June 15, 1913 Humboldt, Nebraska
- Died: October 20, 2000 (aged 87) Omaha, Nebraska
- Party: Democratic
- Spouse: Mildred L. Lawrence (m. 1938)
- Children: 2
- Relatives: Otto Kotouc Sr. (father)
- Education: University of Nebraska; Harvard Law School
- Occupation: Attorney, banker

Otto Kotouc Jr. (June 15, 1913 – October 20, 2000) was a Democratic politician from Nebraska who served as a member of the Nebraska Legislature from the 1st district from 1941 to 1943.

== Early life ==
Kotouc was born in Humboldt, Nebraska, in 1913. His father, Otto Kotouc Sr., served in the Nebraska House of Representatives from 1909 to 1913, and later served in the Nebraska Legislature. Kotouc attended the University of Nebraska and Harvard Law School, and worked as an attorney and banker in Humboldt.

== Nebraska Legislature ==
In 1940, when State Senator Joseph C. Reavis opted to run for Congress rather than seek re-election, Kotouc ran to succeed him in the 1st district. He defeated Fred Rockwell in the general election.

Expecting to be called into active duty during World War II, Kotouc declined to seek a second term in 1942 and resumed his legal practice and banking work.

== Post-legislative career ==
After leaving the legislature, Kotouc was elected the chairman of the Richardson County Democratic Party. He was active in the effort to consolidate the state's school districts, serving as the head of the Nebraska School Reorganization Committee in the 1960s and 1970s. Kotouc founded the Nebraska Bar Foundation and was the president of the University of Nebraska Foundation and the Nebraska State Historical Society Foundation.

== Death ==
Kotouc died on October 20, 2000.
