= Walldorf, Thuringia =

Walldorf
- Ortsteil of Meiningen
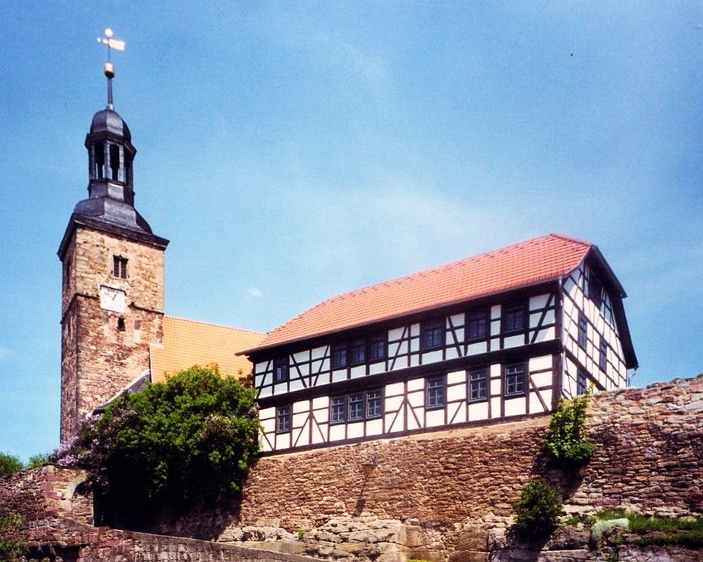

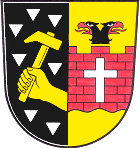
- Coat of arms
- Interactive map of Walldorf
- Location within Germany Location within Thuringia
- Coordinates: 50°37′N 10°23′E
- Country: Germany
- State: Thuringia
- District: Schmalkalden-Meiningen
- Town: Meiningen

Area
  - Total: 12.16 km^{2} (4.70 sq mi)
- Elevation: 290 m (950 ft)

Population (2017-12-31)
  - Total: 2,164
  - Density: 178.0/km^{2} (460.9/sq mi)
- Time zone: UTC+01:00 (CET)
  - Summer (DST): UTC+02:00 (CEST)
- Postal codes: 98639
- Dialling codes: 03693
- Website: www.walldorf-werra.de

Walldorf (German pronunciation: [ˈvalˌdɔʁf]) is a village and a former municipality the district of Schmalkalden-Meiningen in Thuringia, Germany. Since 1 January 2019, it is part of the town Meiningen.

Its most notable sight is a fortress church, Kirchenburg Walldorf, in the middle of town on a hill. In April 2012 it was heavily damaged in a fire.

Kirchenburg (fortified church) Walldorf, idealized, by G. Lilie 1904

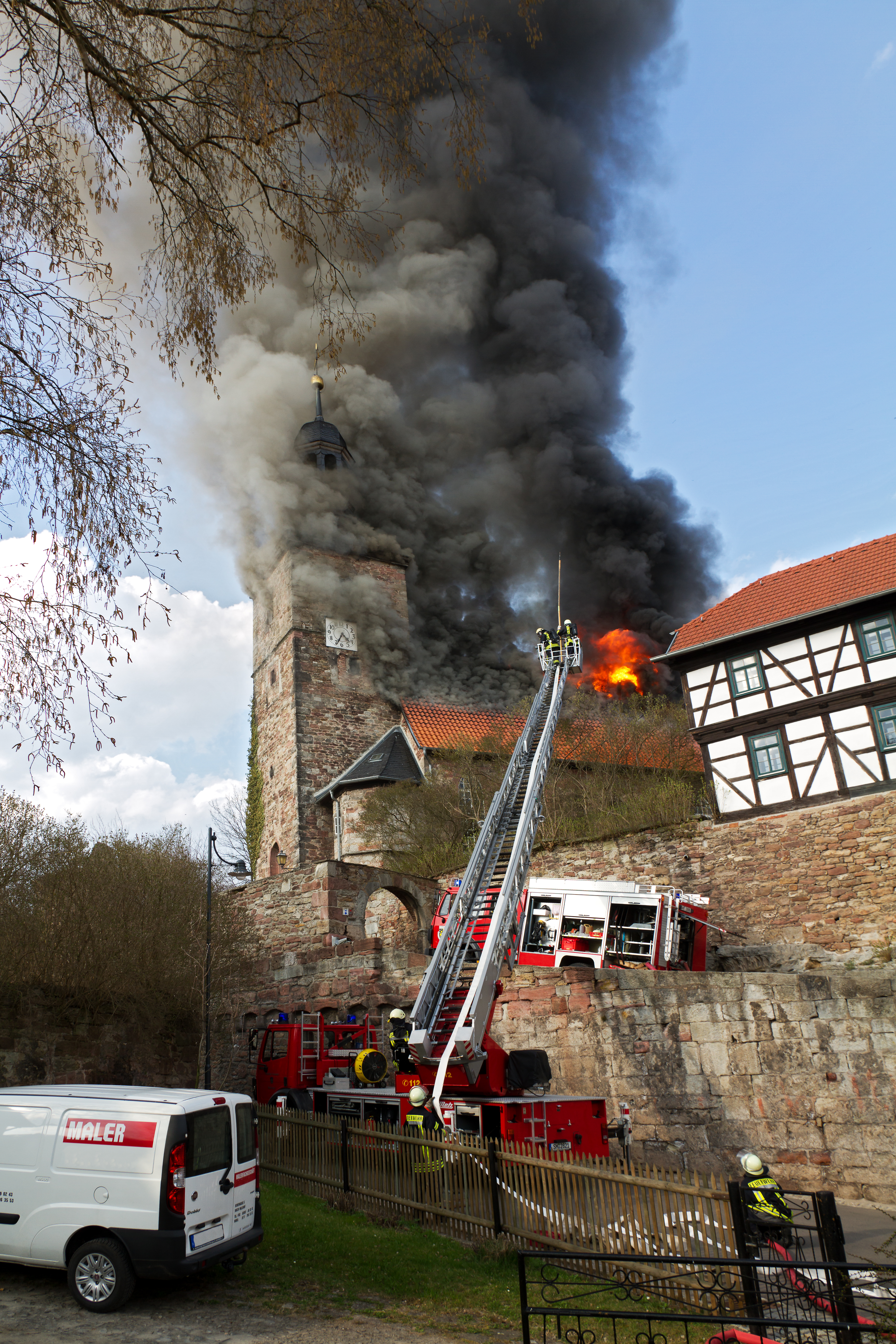
The burning of Kirchenburg Walldorf, April 2012
