= John H. Campbell =

American jurist (1868–1928)

John Henry Campbell

Associate Justice, Arizona Territorial Supreme Court
- In office March 22, 1905 – February 14, 1912
- Nominated by: Theodore Roosevelt
- Preceded by: Seat created March 3, 1905, by 33 Stat.L. 998, 10 F.S.A. 400
- Succeeded by: Position eliminated by Arizona statehood

Personal details
- Born: September 19, 1868 Tuscola, Illinois
- Died: June 10, 1928 (aged 59) Loma Linda, California
- Party: Republican
- Spouse(s): Estelle Freet (m. 1890–1910) Elise Wheaton Nave (m. 1916)
- Education: George Washington University
- Profession: Attorney

John Henry Campbell (September 19, 1868 – June 10, 1928) was an American jurist who served as an associate justice of the Arizona Territorial Supreme Court from 1905 until 1912. Beginning his legal career overseeing pardon applications for the United States Department of Justice, he moved to Arizona Territory in 1901 and became an Assistant United States Attorney the next year. Campbell was appointed to the territorial bench in 1905 and served until Arizona gained statehood.

== Biography ==
Campbell was born on September 19, 1869, in Tuscola, Illinois, to William J. and Milla (Smith) Campbell. He attended public schools before graduating from Columbian University (now George Washington University) with a Bachelor of Laws in 1891 and a Master of Laws in 1892. While in college, he worked for the United States Treasury Department. Campbell was admitted to the D.C. bar in 1892. Two years later, he joined the United States Department of Justice where he oversaw pardon processing. Campbell married Estelle Freet of Washington D.C., on April 15, 1890. The union produced

four children: William, Helen, Ruth and John Jr.

Moving to Arizona Territory in 1901, Campbell formed a partnership with Roscoe Dale based in Tucson. The next year, he became an Assistant United States Attorney in Nogales. Campbell was a member of the Knights of Pythias and served as Grand Chancellor of Arizona.

In January 1905, the 23rd Arizona Territorial Legislature sent a request to the United States House of Representatives requesting the creation of a fifth judicial district within Arizona Territory. Congressional approval for a new judge on the Arizona Territorial Supreme Court came at the beginning of March. President Theodore Roosevelt nominated Campbell to be an associate justice of the Arizona Territorial Supreme Court on March 15, 1905. He took his oath of office on March 22, 1905. While Campbell was nominated for the newly created fifth district, upon taking office, he was assigned to replace George Russell Davis in the first district. Eugene A. Tucker in turn was assigned to the fifth district. President William Howard Taft nominated him for a second term on April 8, 1909.

While serving on the bench, Campbell wrote close to fifty opinions. They tended to be concise, easily read, and well reasoned. His knowledge of business and commerce led to his writing a number of opinions in the area, including Valley Bank of Phoenix v. Brown, 9 Arizona 311 (1905), Friedman v. Suttle, 10 Arizona 57 (1906), and The Bank of Bisbee v. Graf, 12 Arizona 156. In Gila Valley, Globe and Northern Railway v. Hall, 13 Arizona 270 (1911), Campbell halved a $10,000 award that Hall had received after being injured while being required to ride a three-wheeled velocipede at 8 to 12 miles per hour (13 to 19 km/h) as a condition of his employment. In City of Globe v. Slack, 11 Arizona 408 (1910), Campbell backed the rights of a group of land owners when the city tried to revive a plan to build a street on their property after having allowed the plan to die.

Dealing with criminal matters, Campbell wrote opinions in Buffehr v. Territory of Arizona, 11 Arizona 165 (1907) which dealt with the theft of a fifty dollar gold certificate, the statutory rape case of Levy v. Territory of Arizona, 13 Arizona 425 (1911), and the attempted murder case of Williams v. Territory of Arizona, 13 Arizona 306 (1911). In Spence v. Territory of Arizona, 12 Arizona 20 (1910), Campbell ruled that testimony by an experienced big game hunter about the nature of inflicted wounds could be allowed during trial involving a right of self-defense argument. He also granted a retrial to a union organizer convicted of assault with a deadly weapon in Ryan v. Territory of Arizona, 12 Arizona 208 (1909). In other matters, Campbell sided with the territorial medical board in Aiton v. The Board of Medical Examiners, 13 Arizona 354 (1911) when the doctor claimed his "mineral waters and preparations" had medicinal benefit in the treatment of "incipient tuberculosis, system catarrh, and catarrh of the head, Bright's disease, diabetes, rheumatism, and numerous other diseases". The justice found the territorial laws allowed a referendum on the prohibition of alcohol to be placed before the voters in Thalheimer v. Board of Supervisors of Maricopa County, 11 Arizona 430 (1908). Campbell also wrote opinion in Tribolet v. The United States, 11 Arizona 435 (1908), the only antitrust case to come before the territorial court.

Arizona gaining statehood on February 14, 1912, marked the end of Campbell's time on the territorial bench. After leaving the bench, he partnered with Frederick S. Nave in Tucson to form the law firm of Nave & Campbell. Shortly afterward, Nave experienced a severe decline in his health and died in September 1912. Campbell's first wife, Estelle, died on October 17, 1910. He married his former partner's widow, Elise Wheaton Nave, on March 30, 1916.

Campbell formed a law partnership with Samuel L Kingan in 1917. Attorney's such as Archie R. Conner, George R. Darnell, and Frederick G. Nave would later join the firm. At the firm, Campbell was known for representing the Arizona National Bank as well as a number of mining companies. In March 1919, Campbell was appointed to the Arizona Board of Regents. He remained a regent until his retirement in January 1927. Campbell died in Loma Linda, California, on June 10, 1928. He was buried in Tucson's Evergreen Cemetery.
