= Joseph D. Bethune =

American jurist (1842–1912)

Associate Justice, Arizona Territorial Supreme Court
- In office June 1, 1894 – August 10, 1897
- Nominated by: Grover Cleveland
- Preceded by: Richard Elihu Sloan
- Succeeded by: George Russell Davis

Personal details
- Born: July 3, 1842 Columbus, Georgia, US
- Died: October 8, 1912 (aged 70) Los Angeles, California, US
- Party: Democratic
- Spouse: Mary Agnes Clark (m. 1869)
- Profession: Attorney

Military service
- Allegiance: Confederate States
- Branch/service: Confederate States Army
- Years of service: 1861–1865
- Rank: First Lieutenant
- Battles/wars: Chickamauga; Malvern Hill

Joseph Daniel Bethune (July 3, 1842 – October 8, 1912) was an American jurist who served as Associate Justice of the Arizona Territorial Supreme Court from 1894 till 1897.

== Biography ==
Bethune was born to James N. and Frances (Gundy) Bethune in Columbus, Georgia on July 3, 1842. He was educated in local schools. At the beginning of the American Civil War, Bethune enlisted in the Confederate States Army. He served for the majority of the war and was wounded at the battles of Chickamauga and Malvern Hill. The wound suffered at Chickamauga resulted in an extended hospital stay and its lingered for the rest of his life. Near the end of the war, Bethune had risen to the rank of first lieutenant in command of an artillery company. He surrendered to Union forces at Macon, Georgia.

Following the war, Bethune settled in Warrenton, Virginia where he practiced law and operated a farm. He married Mary Agnes Clark in 1869. The union produced six children: Frank, James N., Isabelle, Joseph D., Fannie, and Mary Agnes.

In 1876, Bethune moved to Los Angeles, California where he continued to work as an attorney. He was appointed register for the Los Angeles land office in September 1885. Bethune resigned from the position in August 1887. Health concerns prompted a move to Tucson, Arizona Territory in March 1893.

On March 22, 1894, Marshall H. Williams received Senate confirmation to become Associate Justice of the Arizona Territorial Supreme Court. This triggered a political battle within Arizona's Democratic party. Williams eventually decided to not accept the position and Chief Justice Albert C. Baker recommend the next candidate be selected from outside the territory and thus not aligned with any of the battling factions. President Grover Cleveland nominated Bethune to fill the empty position on May 2, 1894. He was confirmed by the Senate on May 9 and took his oath of office in Tombstone on June 1, 1894. Upon taking office he was assigned to the first judicial district, consisting of Cochise and Pima counties.

While serving on the supreme court, Bethune wrote eight opinions siding with the majority and one dissenting opinion. His writing tended to be brief, precise, fact based, and focused upon his understanding of the law as it existed instead of how he felt the law should be. In Evans v. Blankenship, 4 Arizona 307 (1895), David Neahr, an early settler in the Phoenix area, had set aside a section of land in 1880 to use as a "public square". In 1883, Neahr offered the same land for the site of a new capital building. Bethune found the land had already been given to the city of Phoenix despite the city's lack of a formal acceptance. Blevins v. Territory of Arizona, 4 Arizona 326 (1895) dealt with a case where the defendant was accused of illegally branding a calf but the indictment against him failed to state a motive for the conversion. In Blackburn v. the United States, 5 Arizona 162 (1897), the Federal government was attempting to cancel the patent on a mining claim while Salcido v. Genung, 5 Arizona 23 (1896) was an ejectment case. In Sullivan v. Garland, 5 Arizona 188 (1897), Mrs. Nellie Sullivan had filed suit for malicious prosecution after being arrested for a felony. Bethune's ruling found the trial court had incorrectly granted demurrer and ordered the case back to the trial court for retrial.

When the McKinley administration took office, it decided to replace the judges on the Arizona bench. Bethune's time as a judge ended on August 10, 1897, when he administered the oath of office to his successor, George Russell Davis. After leaving office, he practiced law in Prescott for a time but had returned to Los Angeles by 1900. A heart attack around 1910 prompted his retirement. Bethune died at his home on October 8, 1912. He was buried at the Hollywood Memorial Park Cemetery.
