= James Alger Fee =

American judge (1888–1959)

Judge of the United States Court of Appeals for the Ninth Circuit
- In office April 30, 1954 – August 25, 1959
- Appointed by: Dwight D. Eisenhower
- Preceded by: Clifton Mathews
- Succeeded by: Montgomery Oliver Koelsch

Chief Judge of the United States District Court for the District of Oregon
- In office 1948–1954
- Preceded by: Office established
- Succeeded by: Claude C. McColloch

Judge of the United States District Court for the District of Oregon
- In office March 18, 1931 – April 30, 1954
- Appointed by: Herbert Hoover
- Preceded by: Robert S. Bean
- Succeeded by: William G. East

Personal details
- Born: James Alger Fee; September 24, 1888 Pendleton, Oregon, US
- Died: August 25, 1959 (aged 70)
- Resting place: Arlington National Cemetery
- Education: Whitman College (AB); Columbia Law School (LLB)

James Alger Fee (September 24, 1888 – August 25, 1959) was a United States circuit judge of the United States Court of Appeals for the Ninth Circuit and previously was a United States district judge of the United States District Court for the District of Oregon. A veteran of the United States Army, his first judicial position was with the Oregon Circuit Court. While a federal judge he made national news for his decision during World War II regarding the application of the exclusion orders that had forced those of Japanese heritage from the West Coast.

== Early life ==
James Alger was born in Eastern Oregon in the city of Pendleton on September 24, 1888. He went to college in Walla Walla, Washington, at Whitman College. There he graduated with an Artium Baccalaureus degree in 1910 and was a member of the Gamma Zeta chapter of the Beta Theta Pi fraternity. He then moved to New York City, New York and earned a master's degree at Columbia University. After this Fee went on to law school at Columbia Law School, graduating in 1914 with a Bachelor of Laws.

== Career ==
Fee returned to Oregon where he passed the bar in 1914, and entered private practice in his hometown of Pendleton. In 1916, he began serving as that city’s attorney, staying until 1917 when he joined the United States Army's Air Service as a lieutenant. Fee remained with the army until 1919, when moved to the War Department as a member of the legal staff. In 1920, he left the War Department and returned to Pendleton and private practice. In 1927, Fee left private practice to start a judicial career, serving as on the Oregon Circuit Court from 1927 to 1931.

== District Court service ==
Fee received a recess appointment from President Herbert Hoover on March 18, 1931, to a seat on the United States District Court for the District of Oregon vacated by Judge Robert S. Bean. He was nominated to the same position by President Hoover on December 15, 1931. He was confirmed by the United States Senate on December 22, 1931, and received his commission the next day. He served as Chief Judge from 1948 to 1954. His service terminated on April 30, 1954, due to his elevation to the Ninth Circuit.

=== Notable cases ===
During Fee's over twenty years on the district court he ruled on a variety of topics. In United States v. Earnest F. Cramer and E. R. Cramer, Fee ruled that Native Americans through treaties they signed in the 19th century had superior fishing rights over non-Native Americans at places such as Celilo Falls. In 1952, Fee decided two cases concerning the 1948 flood of Vanport, Oregon. He ruled that the government was not liable for the damage caused to the residents’ property.

Some other cases included a labor dispute involving Montgomery Ward, holding the Methodist Episcopal Church legally obligated to pay bondholders on defaulted bonds they issued to build a hospital, and even refused to appoint a commissioner for Crater Lake National Park. He also ruled on the internment of Japanese-Americans during World War II, presided over a case in Pennsylvania, and signed off on the condemnation of the water company serving Salem, Oregon, as that city took over the water supply.

== Court of Appeals service ==
Fee was nominated by President Dwight D. Eisenhower on April 6, 1954, to a seat on the United States Court of Appeals for the Ninth Circuit vacated by Judge Clifton Mathews. He was confirmed by the Senate on April 23, 1954, and received his commission on April 30, 1954, moving his chambers from Oregon to San Francisco, California after he began service. His service terminated on August 25, 1959, due to his death.

=== Notable case ===
In 1957, Fee wrote the opinion in Bartholomae Corp. v. United States, 253 F.2d 716 (9th Cir. 1957), that refused to hold the federal government liable for damages related to nuclear bomb testing in 1951.

== Japanese internment ==
On June 12, 1942, as district court judge Fee began presiding over the trial of Minoru Yasui, a native Oregonian of Japanese descent who was on trial for breaking curfew. The curfew had been imposed by the United States Army's General John L. DeWitt under the authority of President Franklin Roosevelt’s Executive Order 9066 that began the Japanese American internment after the bombing of Pearl Harbor. The curfew only applied to those of Japanese heritage, with Yasui being the first person to be arrested for violating the curfew. This case would make it all the way to the United States Supreme Court. The decision to take this trial to the Supreme Court made national news.

Yasui was an attorney who was a United States Army reservist and, until the start of the war, worked for the Japanese consulate in Chicago, Illinois. The trial was held at the Federal Courthouse in downtown Portland where Yasui had broken the curfew. Fee determined in his ruling for the case that the curfew could only apply to aliens, as martial law had not been declared. However, he also ruled that because Yasui had worked for the Japanese government that he had forfeited his citizenship so that the curfew did apply to him. Fee sentenced Yasui to 1 year in jail, served at the Multnomah County Jail. Meanwhile, his case went on appeal until reaching the Supreme Court of the United States as Yasui v. United States, (320 U.S. 115) with that court determining the opposite of Fee, that Yasui was a citizen, but the curfew did apply to citizens. After the Supreme Court returned the case to Fee for re-evaluation, he affirmed the conviction on the grounds the Supreme Court had determined.

== Family and later life ==
Fee’s father was also a judge in Oregon. He was a partner in Fee & Slater. On February 9, 1916, James Fee married Frances Waldo. She was born in Berkshire, New York, in 1886, and died on September 20, 1935. They had three daughters, Frances Louise, Margery Waldo, and Lillian Adele. Prior to her death Frances had been an active member of the American Association of University Women, Army and Navy league, and the executive board of the Camp Fire Girls. She also took an interest in the affairs of her sorority, Alpha Chi Omega, and was for a time the alumnae adviser of the University of Washington chapter. On December 22, 1943, James Fee married Alice Emma Tomkins. She was born in Cascade Locks, Oregon on September 11, 1897, and died on September 21, 1995. They did not have any children. Fee died on August 25, 1959, and is buried at Arlington National Cemetery in Arlington County, Virginia.

Legal offices
Preceded by Robert S. Bean	Judge of the United States District Court for the District of Oregon; 1931–1954	Succeeded by William G. East
Preceded by Office established	Chief Judge of the United States District Court for the District of Oregon; 1948–1954	Succeeded by Claude C. McColloch
Preceded by Clifton Mathews	Judge of the United States Court of Appeals for the Ninth Circuit; 1954–1959	Succeeded by Montgomery Oliver Koelsch
