= Frederick S. Nave =

American jurist (1873–1912)

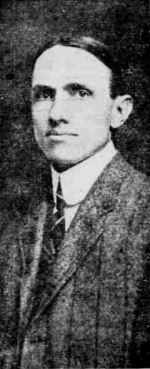

Associate Justice, Arizona Territorial Supreme Court
- In office November 17, 1905 – April 1, 1909
- Nominated by: Theodore Roosevelt
- Preceded by: Eugene A. Tucker
- Succeeded by: Ernest W. Lewis

Personal details
- Born: January 7, 1873 Lewis Center, Ohio
- Died: September 27, 1912 (aged 39) Globe, Arizona
- Party: Republican
- Spouse: Elise Wheaton (Gill) Jones (m. 1901)
- Education: Ohio Wesleyan University
- Profession: Attorney

Frederick Solomon Nave (January 7, 1873 – September 27, 1912) was an American jurist. Shortly after graduation from law school, he moved to Arizona Territory for health reasons. There he was appointed to serve on a committee created to overhaul the territorial legal code. Nave then served as a county attorney and United States Attorney before being appointed an associate justice of the Arizona Territorial Supreme Court. His health problems prompted an early resignation from the territorial bench and he practiced law for several years before his death at age 39.

== Biography ==
Nave was born to Orville James and Anna Eliza (Semans) Nave in Lewis Center, Ohio, on January 7, 1873. He graduated from Ohio Wesleyan University in 1895 and was elected to Phi Beta Kappa society. Nave then completed a law degree at Northwestern University in 1897 and was a member of the Delta Chi fraternity. While studying law, he taught Greek and Latin at an academy affiliated with the university. Following graduation, Nave accepted a promising position with a law firm in Chicago.

Suffering from tuberculosis, Nave moved to Arizona Territory in 1898 for health reasons. Settling initially in the Phoenix area, he was admitted to the Arizona bar on February 23, 1898. In March 1899, Nave was appointed as the clerk for a committee created to overhaul the territorial legal code. The commission's work served as the basis of the 1901 revision of the Arizona legal code. In 1900, Nave was elected Santa Cruz County attorney. Around the same time, he moved to Nogales. Nave was appointed as a United States Attorney on January 8, 1902.

Nave married Elise Wheaton (Gill) Jones in Nogales on March 26, 1901. The couple had a son and an adopted daughter.

President Theodore Roosevelt appointed Nave to replace Eugene A. Tucker as Associate Justice of the Arizona Territorial Supreme Court on November 8, 1905. He took his oath of office on November 17. As a justice, Nave wrote several opinions with significant impact. In addition to multiple cases dealing with mining concerns, Nave's opinion in Territory of Arizona v. Ruval, 9 Arizona 415 (1906) dealt with the issue of double jeopardy while Maxwell v. Territory of Arizona, 10 Arizona 1 (1906) considered degrees of a crime with respect to a convicted cattle rustler. Ford v. United States, 12 Arizona 23 (1908) was concerned with charges of conspiracy to commit adultery within a brothel. Eytinge v. Territory of Arizona, 12 Arizona 131 (1909) dealt with murder by chloroform while Molina v. Territory of Arizona, 12 Arizona 14 (1908) involved a murder charge reduced to manslaughter.

Among his more unusual cases were Duffield v. Ashurst, 12 Arizona 360 (1909) which dealt with Ralph H. Cameron's right to collect tolls for use of the Bright Angel Trail. Nave found the court had no jurisdiction to determine which printing company would receive a contract from a county board of supervisors in Hammer v. Smith, 11 Arizona 420 (1908). The dual cases of Leatherwood c. Hill, 10 Arizona 16 (1906) and 10 Arizona 243 (1906) dealt with the Arizona Pioneer's Historical Society's efforts to compel the territorial auditor to release funds allocated by the territorial legislature of the society. The case of In Re By-a-lil-le, 12 Arizona 150 (1909) was a habeas corpus case dealing with an incident where the Federal government had rounded up a group of suspected troublemakers from the Navajo reservation and were holding them at Fort Huachuca. Nave also ruled that a municipal water supply could be established despite the protests of a private water company in Phoenix Water Company v. The Common Council of Phoenix, 9 Arizona 430 (1906).

Health concerns prompted Nave to resign from the bench. The resignation was effective April 1, 1909. After leaving the bench, Nave opened a legal practice in Globe. From 1908 till 1909 he was an executive committee member for the National Irrigation Company. He served as president of the Arizona Bar Association from 1911 till 1912. Following Arizona statehood, Nave formed a legal partnership with John H. Campbell. Shortly thereafter, Nave's health took a significant downturn and he spent the summer of 1912 in Los Angeles trying to recover. Nave died at his home in Globe on September 27, 1912, as a result of his tuberculosis. He was buried in Glendale, California's Forest Lawn Cemetery. His widow married John H. Campbell, Nave's former law partner, on March 30, 1916.
