= Charles Tweed =

Charles Tweed may refer to:

- Charles Austin Tweed (1842–1918), American politician and jurist
- Charles H. Tweed (1895–1970), American orthodontist
