= George Russell Davis =

American judge (1861–1933)

George R. Davis
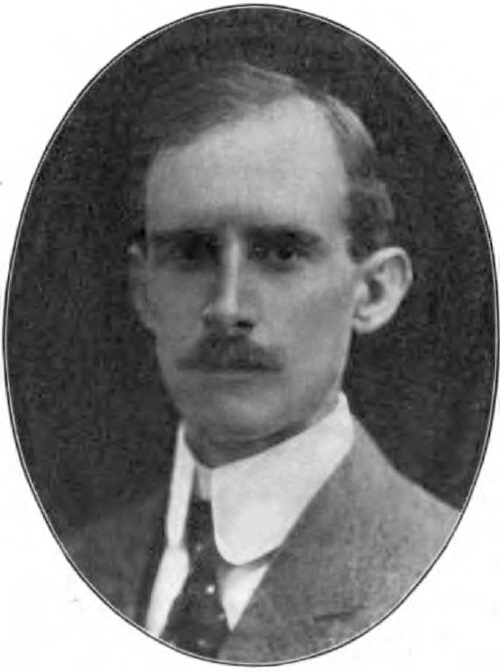

Associate Justice, Arizona Territorial Supreme Court
- In office August 10, 1897 – March 31, 1905
- Nominated by: William McKinley
- Preceded by: Joseph D. Bethune
- Succeeded by: Eugene A. Tucker

Personal details
- Born: December 13, 1861 Huntsville, Ohio
- Died: June 13, 1933 (aged 71) Pasadena, California
- Party: Republican
- Spouse(s): Emma J. Davis (m. 1886–1889) Katherine H. Scovil (m. 1890)
- Profession: Attorney

George Russell Davis (December 13, 1861 – June 13, 1933) was an American jurist who served as an associate justice of the Arizona Territorial Supreme Court from 1897 until 1905. An attorney by trade, he was active in Republican politics and became a personal friend of William McKinley. Shortly after McKinley became President of the United States, Davis requested and received appointment to the Arizona bench. After his time as a judge in Arizona Territory, Davis moved to California where he worked as an attorney and served one term as a judge for the Superior Court of Los Angeles County.

== Background ==
Davis was born to James and Mary (College) Davis in Huntsville, Ohio, on December 13, 1861. He was educated in public schools in Wapakoneta, Ohio, graduating from high school in June 1880. Following graduation, Davis began a study of law and was admitted to the Ohio bar on June 3, 1883. He practiced law in Wapakoneta and became active in local civics and Republican politics. Davis married Emma J. Davis on December 21, 1886. The marriage lasted until her death on July 1, 1889. His second marriage was to Katherine H. Scovil on October 16, 1890. The union produced four children.

A delegate to the 1896 Republican National Convention, Davis was also personal friends with presidential nominee William McKinley and United States Senator John Sherman. During a trip to the Arizona Territory in March 1897, Davis was impressed by the area. He then sent a telegram to McKinley, who had recently been inaugurated President of the United States asking to be appointed Chief Justice for the territory. Davis was nominated to become an associate justice of the Arizona Territorial Supreme Court on June 26, 1897. He accepted the nomination and moved to Tucson where he was assigned the first judicial district. Davis took his oath of office on August 10, 1897. President Theodore Roosevelt appointed Davis for a second term on December 12, 1901.

Of the roughly sixty opinions written by Davis during his time on the Arizona bench, Davis only wrote one dissent. His opinions were clearly written and easy to read. An example is found in The London, Paris, and American Bank, Limited v, Abrams, 6 Arizona 87 (1898), where Davis wrote "An examination of the mutilated, interlined, and disfigured transcript shows the evidence in support of the material allegations of the appellants' complaints to be meager, unsatisfactory, and to a considerable extent incompetent." Another example came in Bennett v. Nichols, 9 Arizona 138 (1905), a case involving the legislatures ability to grant a 20-year tax exemption to a railroad. Davis' opinion states "But aside from this, the principle is abundantly established that, when conditions and considerations upon which a grant of exemption was based have been met, a contract right exists, which cannot be impaired by a subsequent statute of modification or repeal."

In Wilson v. Territory of Arizona, 7 Arizona 47 (1901), a convicted murderer was appealing his verdict because the court findings recommended he seek the mercy of the "cort" and found him guilty of second "decree" murder. Campbell found "That there can be any doubt as to what was intended by the verdict does not seem to us even remotely possible. Bad spelling will not vitiate a verdict, where it has the requisites of being certain and intelligible." Taylor v. Territory of Arizona, 7 Arizona 234 (1901) was an appeal of a burglary conviction. The law at the time differentiated between burglary occurring during the "day time" versus at "night time", with a higher penalty for burglary at night. The appeal was based upon the fact the crime was discovered at 7:30 am while sunrise on the day of the crime was at 7:04 am. Campbell upheld the original conviction on the basis it was highly unlikely the crime has occurred in the 26 minutes between sunrise and discovery.

On March 22, 1905, Davis's seat in Tucson, in the first district, was transferred to John H. Campbell, who had been appointed to a new seat on the court. Davis took the seat of the newly created fifth district in Solomonville. Davis resigned as an associate justice effective March 31, 1905. He was succeeded by Eugene A. Tucker the following day.

After leaving the Arizona bench, Davis moved to Los Angeles, California. He was admitted to the California bar on November 6, 1905, and went into private legal practice. In February 1909, Governor James Gillett appointed Davis to serve on the Superior Court of Los Angeles County. The conservative leaning Davis' attempt to win reelection to the California bench in 1910 was defeated by a progressive "good government" group known as the "Goo-goos". Davis served as president of the Pasadena Republican Club and a member Republican County Executive Committee of Los Angeles county before his appointment to the Superior Court of Los Angeles County. He returned to his legal practice after leaving the California bench for several years before retiring. Davis died at his Pasadena home on June 13, 1933. He was cremated with his remains sent to Wapakoneta, Ohio, for interment.
