= John Titus =

John Titus may refer to:

- John Titus (jurist) (1812–1876), American jurist and Chief Justice of both Utah and Arizona Territories
- John Titus (baseball) (1876–1943), American baseball player

== See also ==
- Jack Titus (1908-1978), Australian rules footballer
