= 1911 Arizona gubernatorial election =

- December 12, 1911
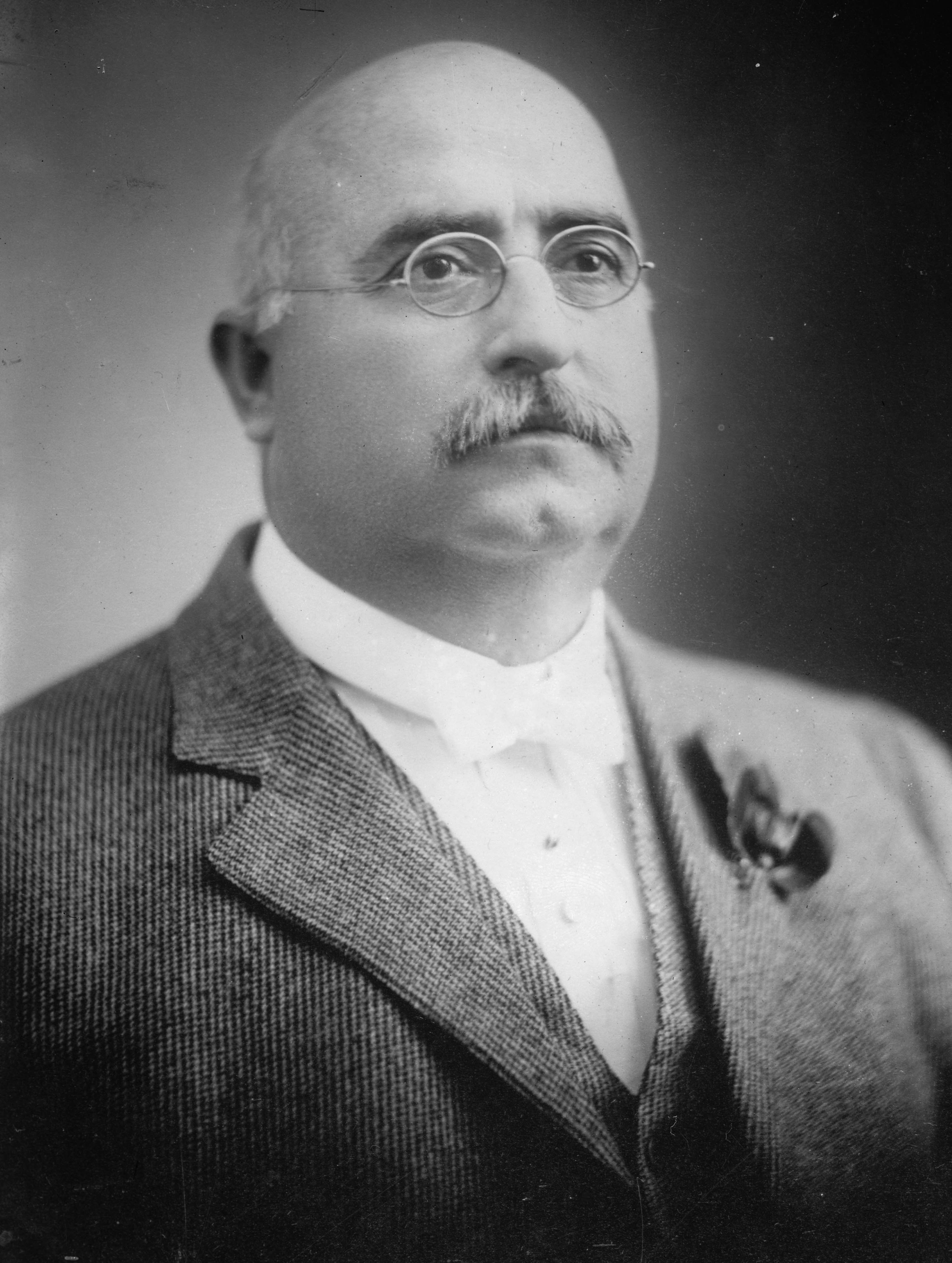

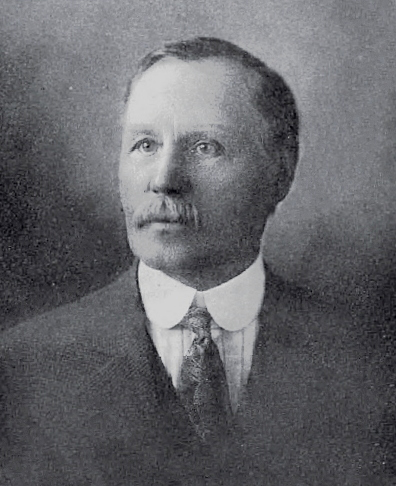

| Nominee | George W. P. Hunt | Edmund W. Wells | P. W. Gallentine |
| Party | Democratic | Republican | Socialist |
| Popular vote | 11,123 | 9,166 | 1,247 |
| Percentage | 51.46% | 42.41% | 5.77% |
- County results Hunt: 40–50% 50–60% 60–70% Wells: 40–50% 50–60%
Governor of Arizona Territory before election
Richard Elihu Sloan
Republican
Governor of Arizona
after election
George W. P. Hunt
Democratic

The 1911 Arizona gubernatorial election took place on December 12, 1911, for the post of the first elected governor of Arizona. The Democratic nominee George W. P. Hunt defeated the Republican nominee Edmund W. Wells. Hunt and Wells were both members of the Constitutional Convention, Hunt being chosen President and leading the way for much of the drafting. Wells refused to sign the Constitution, considering aspects like the initiative, referendum, and especially judicial recall to be too radical.

These fears proved prophetic when it was originally rejected by fellow Republican, former judge, and incumbent President William Howard Taft. Wells' refusal to sign, and Taft's veto of, the state constitution hurt but did not cripple his electoral chances, as he only lost by less than 2,000 votes out of about 21,000 cast.

George W. P. Hunt was sworn in as Arizona's first elected governor on February 14, 1912, the date on which Arizona was admitted as the forty-eighth state.

== Democratic primary ==
=== Candidates ===
- George W. P. Hunt, President of the Arizona Constitutional Convention, former President of the Legislative Council, and businessman.
- Thomas F. Weedin, editor of the Blade-Tribune.
- Henry A. Hughes, physician.

=== Results ===
Democratic primary results
| Party | Candidate | Votes | % |
|---|---|---|---|
| Democratic | George W. P. Hunt | 5,241 | 53.85% |
| Democratic | Thomas Weedin | 3,532 | 36.29% |
| Democratic | Henry A. Hughes | 960 | 9.86% |
| Total votes | | 9,733 | 100.00% |

== Republican primary ==
=== Candidates ===
- Edmund W. Wells, former Associate Justice of Arizona Territorial Supreme Court and former Attorney General of Arizona Territory
- George U. Young

=== Results ===
Republican primary results
| Party | Candidate | Votes | % |
|---|---|---|---|
| Republican | Edmund W. Wells | 3,051 | 60.58% |
| Republican | George U. Young | 1,985 | 39.42% |
| Total votes | | 5,036 | 100.00% |

== General election ==
=== Results ===
Arizona gubernatorial election, 1911
| Party | Candidate | Votes | % |
|---|---|---|---|
| Democratic | George W. P. Hunt | 11,123 | 51.46% |
| Republican | Edmund W. Wells | 9,166 | 42.41% |
| Socialist | P. W. Gallentine | 1,247 | 5.77% |
| Prohibition | T. W. Otis | 79 | 0.36% |
| Majority | | 1,957 | 9.05% |
| Total votes | | 21,615 | 100.00% |
| Democratic gain from Republican | | | |

==== Results ====
| County | George W. P. Hunt Democratic | | Edmund W. Wells Republican | | P. W. Gallentine Socialist | | T. W. Otis Prohibition | | Margin | | Total votes cast |
| County | # | % | # | % | # | % | # | % | # | % | Total votes cast |
|---|---|---|---|---|---|---|---|---|---|---|---|
| Apache | 265 | 41.93% | 358 | 56.65% | 8 | 1.27% | 1 | 0.16% | -93 | -14.72% | 632 |
| Cochise | 2,017 | 53.96% | 1,458 | 39.00% | 250 | 6.69% | 13 | 0.35% | 559 | 14.95% | 3,738 |
| Coconino | 284 | 40.34% | 403 | 57.24% | 15 | 2.13% | 2 | 0.28% | -119 | -16.90% | 704 |
| Gila | 1,068 | 58.23% | 545 | 29.72% | 218 | 11.89% | 3 | 0.16% | 523 | 28.52% | 1,834 |
| Graham | 645 | 55.65% | 403 | 34.77% | 111 | 9.58% | 0 | 0.00% | 242 | 20.88% | 1,159 |
| Greenlee | 600 | 53.38% | 464 | 41.28% | 60 | 5.34% | 0 | 0.00% | 136 | 12.10% | 1,124 |
| Maricopa | 2,272 | 51.38% | 1,969 | 44.53% | 142 | 3.21% | 39 | 0.88% | 303 | 6.85% | 4,422 |
| Mohave | 359 | 56.71% | 152 | 24.01% | 120 | 18.96% | 2 | 0.32% | 207 | 32.70% | 633 |
| Navajo | 333 | 45.99% | 385 | 53.18% | 5 | 0.69% | 1 | 0.14% | -52 | -7.18% | 724 |
| Pima | 879 | 48.19% | 911 | 49.95% | 29 | 1.59% | 5 | 0.27% | -32 | -1.75% | 1,824 |
| Pinal | 364 | 48.02% | 353 | 46.57% | 39 | 5.15% | 2 | 0.26% | 11 | 1.45% | 758 |
| Santa Cruz | 307 | 54.14% | 237 | 41.80% | 23 | 4.06% | 0 | 0.00% | 70 | 12.35% | 567 |
| Yavapai | 1,084 | 44.68% | 1,175 | 48.43% | 157 | 6.47% | 10 | 0.41% | -91 | -3.75% | 2,426 |
| Yuma | 646 | 60.37% | 353 | 32.99% | 70 | 6.54% | 1 | 0.09% | 293 | 27.38% | 1,070 |
| Totals | 11,123 | 51.46% | 9,166 | 42.41% | 1,247 | 5.77% | 79 | 0.37% | 1,957 | 9.05% | 21,615 |

== Bibliography ==
- Goff, John S. (1973). "Creation of the State of Arizona". George W. P. Hunt and his Arizona. Phoenix: Socio-Technical Publications. p. 48.
