= Senator Tweed =

Senator Tweed may refer to:

- Charles Austin Tweed (1842–1918), Florida State Senate and California State Senate
- William M. Tweed (1823–1878), New York State Senate

== See also ==
- Senator Tweedy (disambiguation)
