= Ernest W. Lewis =

American jurist (1875–1927)

Ernest William Lewis

Associate Justice, Arizona Territorial Supreme Court
- In office May 22, 1909 – February 14, 1912
- Nominated by: William Howard Taft
- Preceded by: Frederick S. Nave
- Succeeded by: position eliminated due to Arizona statehood

Personal details
- Born: December 27, 1875 Indiana, Pennsylvania
- Died: April 3, 1927 (aged 51) Phoenix, Arizona
- Party: Republican
- Spouse: Ethel May Orme (m. 1902)
- Profession: Attorney

Ernest William Lewis (December 27, 1875 – April 3, 1927) was an American jurist who served as an associate justice of the Arizona Territorial Supreme Court from 1909 till Arizona statehood in 1912.

== Biography ==
Lewis was born to George Roberts and Nancy June (McLane) Lewis in Indiana, Pennsylvania on December 27, 1875. He was educated in public schools and enrolled at the University of Minnesota. He contracted a severe case of pneumonia three months before graduation and, based upon a recommendation from a friend, moved to Arizona Territory to recover. Lewis worked for six months at an agricultural research station in Tucson while continuing to study law. After completing his degree requirements for the University of Minnesota, he was admitted to the Arizona bar in 1900.

After obtaining his law license, Lewis practiced law in Phoenix. He formed a law partnership with Thomas Armstrong Jr. in 1904. Except for his years as a judge, Lewis remained active in the partnership until his death. Socially, Lewis was a Mason with membership in the Knights Templar and the Shriners. He was president of the Arizona Club at the time of his death as well as active in Rotary International. Lewis married Ethel May Orme of Phoenix on February 19, 1902. The union produced two sons and a daughter.

President William Howard Taft nominated Lewis to become an associate justice of the Arizona Territorial Supreme Courton April 30, 1909. Senate confirmation occurred on May 18. He took his oath of office on May 22, 1909. He was assigned to the fifth district, comprising Gila, Graham, and Greenlee counties. While serving on the court he lived in Globe.

Writing twelve opinions during his time on the court, three of Lewis's opinions had significant impact as precedents. Tevis et al. v. Ryan, 13 Arizona 120 (1910) was a multi-issued case that was later cited for how it dealt with several procedural issues as well as interactions between the fields of contracts, corporations, and damages. Mayhew v. Brislin 13 Arizona 102 (1910) dealt with realtor commissions involved in the sale of mining properties while Williams v. Territory of Arizona 13 Arizona 27 (1910) became the "leading Arizona case on bogus checks". Hicks v. Krigbaum 13 Arizona 237 (1910) involved a taxpayer challenge to how an election authorizing the issuance of school bonds had been conducted while Boudreaux v. Tucson, Gas, Electric Light and Power Company, 13 Arizona 361 (1911) was a wrongful death case. In Arizona Power Company v. Racine-Sattley Company, 13 Arizona 283 (1911), the plaintiff had ordered some wagons and they were delivered 15 days late. Lewis found the defendant's liability was limited as he had not prior information on the level of damages the late delivery would produce. In Agard v. Scott 13 Arizona 165 (1910), Lewis determined the cost of hiring a watchman could be included when calculating the assessed value of a mining property for tax purposes.

Lewis's time on the bench ended with Arizona statehood on February 14, 1912. He returned to his private practice in Phoenix where he specialized in mining law and water rights. He represented a group of mining companies during a series of strikes that began in 1915. Two years later he was appointed by Woodrow Wilson to a Presidential Mediation Commission with the purpose of ending the strikes and labor unrest that were affecting the copper industry.

== Death ==
Lewis died on April 3, 1927. His body was cremated following funeral services at Phoenix's Trinity Cathedral.
