= William Henry Sawtelle =

American judge (1868–1934)

Judge of the United States Court of Appeals for the Ninth Circuit
- In office January 29, 1931 – December 17, 1934
- Appointed by: Herbert Hoover
- Preceded by: Frank Sigel Dietrich
- Succeeded by: Clifton Mathews

Judge of the United States District Court for the District of Arizona
- In office August 18, 1913 – February 6, 1931
- Appointed by: Woodrow Wilson
- Preceded by: Richard Elihu Sloan
- Succeeded by: Albert Morris Sames

Personal details
- Born: William Henry Sawtelle; August 27, 1868 Tuscumbia, Alabama, U.S.
- Died: December 17, 1934 (aged 66) San Francisco, California, U.S.
- Education: read law

William Henry Sawtelle (August 27, 1868 – December 17, 1934) was a United States circuit judge of the United States Court of Appeals for the Ninth Circuit and previously was a United States district judge of the United States District Court for the District of Arizona.

== Education and career ==
Born in Tuscumbia, Alabama, Sawtelle read law in 1886 and was in private practice of law in Tuscumbia from 1886 to 1903. He was a solicitor for the Alabama 8th Judicial Circuit from 1892 to 1898, and for the Alabama 11th Judicial Circuit from 1898 to 1903. He was in private practice in Tucson, Arizona Territory (State of Arizona from February 14, 1912) from 1903 to 1913.

== Federal judicial service ==
Sawtelle was nominated by President Woodrow Wilson on August 6, 1913, to a seat on the United States District Court for the District of Arizona vacated by Judge Richard Elihu Sloan. He was confirmed by the United States Senate on August 18, 1913, and received his commission the same day. His service terminated on February 6, 1931, due to his elevation to the Ninth Circuit.

Sawtelle was nominated by President Herbert Hoover on January 8, 1931, to a seat on the United States Court of Appeals for the Ninth Circuit vacated by Judge Frank Sigel Dietrich. He was confirmed by the Senate on January 22, 1931, and received his commission on January 29, 1931. His service terminated on December 17, 1934, due to his death of a fall down the stairs at his home in San Francisco, California.

== See also ==
- Battle of Bear Valley

== Sources ==
Legal offices
Preceded by Richard Elihu Sloan	Judge of the United States District Court for the District of Arizona; 1913–1931	Succeeded by Albert Morris Sames
Preceded by Frank Sigel Dietrich	Judge of the United States Court of Appeals for the Ninth Circuit; 1931–1934	Succeeded by Clifton Mathews
