= William F. Turner =

American jurist (1816–1899)

Chief Justice, Arizona Territorial Supreme Court
- In office December 29, 1863 – April 18, 1870
- Nominated by: Abraham Lincoln; Ulysses S. Grant
- Preceded by: N/A (Newly created position)
- Succeeded by: John Titus

Personal details
- Born: 1816 Milton, Pennsylvania, US
- Died: December 1899 (aged 82–83) Indianapolis, Indiana, US
- Party: Whig/Republican
- Spouse: Harriet Miller
- Profession: Attorney

William F. Turner (Note: Turner's middle name is unknown.) (1816 – December 23, 1899) was the first Chief Justice of the Territory of Arizona, serving in that capacity for about seven years. Born in Pennsylvania, he attended college in Ohio and practiced law there after graduation. When the Arizona Territory was created, he sought to be appointed its first governor but was instead made Chief Justice of the Territorial Supreme Court of Arizona. Renominated to a second four-year term, he was later removed under a cloud of scandal and political opposition while having an unblemished legal record. Turner then formed a successful law practice in Kansas, but his final years were impoverished.

== Early life ==
Turner was born to Ann (Smith) and Dr. James P. Turner in Milton, Pennsylvania in 1816. His father was Federal Lands Commissioner for Louisiana and Mississippi during the John Quincy Adams administration. The family was based in Bayou Sara, Louisiana at this time. Dr. Turner's service ended during the Andrew Jackson administration and he moved his family first to Mount Vernon, Ohio and later to Cincinnati. The younger Turner was admitted to Kenyon College, located about 6 mi (9.7 km) from Mount Vernon, in 1838. As a student, he and future US President Rutherford B. Hayes were both members of the Philomathean Society. He graduated on August 9, 1842. During a speech he gave at his graduation, he expressed scorn for those who taught themselves the law instead of attending college. In the speech, Turner proclaimed "A man cannot hammer a lapstone and Blackstone at the same time".

Following graduation, Turner was admitted to the Ohio bar and practiced for several years in Mount Vernon. He married Harriet Miller of Mount Vernon sometime before they moved to Keokuk, Iowa, around 1854. There is no record that the couple had any children. The couple were financially prosperous, with the 1860 U.S. census showing them with over $20,000 in assets (about $716,670 in present-day terms).

== Arizona appointment ==
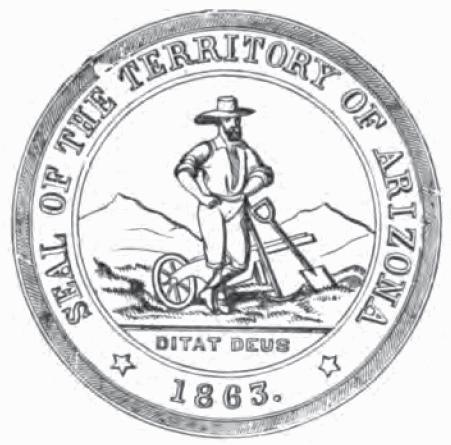

Initially a Whig, Turner joined the Republican Party following the collapse of the Whigs. He began seeking appointment to a government position in 1863. After failing to secure a position as assistant solicitor of the United States Court of Claims, Turner investigated possible diplomatic postings but no consulships were vacant at the time.

By then, President Abraham Lincoln had already appointed John A. Gurley to be Arizona Territory governor, with John N. Goodwin as Chief Justice and William T. Howell and Joseph P. Allyn as Associate Justices on March 6, 1863. However, Gurley and Goodwin never held those offices, as Gurley died suddenly of appendicitis the night before he was to have left for Arizona in August of that year.

Following Gurley's death, Turner wrote Lincoln on August 21, 1863 seeking appointment as Governor. His letter contained the message, "There appears to be no vacancy in consulships. Is there any reason why I cannot receive the appointment of Governor of Arizona ... My friends think I was very badly treated in the matter of the Assistant Solicitorship of the Court of Claims, and the appointment to the above place would be very gratifying to themselves as well as myself." Lincoln instead advanced Goodwin to Governor of Arizona Territory, and nominated Turner for Chief Justice of Arizona Territory on August 22, 1863. Turner and Goodwin were both appointed on an interim basis until the Senate returned from recess in January 1864 to confirm them.

The sequence of events made Turner the last of the new territory's three initial federal judges to receive his appointment, and the second appointed as Chief Justice. Charles Poston, who had lobbied both Lincoln and Congress for creation of an Arizona Territory and was later selected as superintendent of Indian affairs for the new territory, called him "Senator Grymes' man" and claimed he had been appointed due to the influence of his fellow Iowan Senator James W. Grimes. (Note: Poston's account of the territorial appointments was published in 1884 and may be inaccurate since Turner was not among the initial appointments.)

Turner officially accepted his new position in a September 7 letter to U.S. Attorney General Edward Bates. By the time he was prepared to depart for Arizona, most territorial officials were already in transit from Ft. Leavenworth, Kansas by government wagon train. The Chief Justice nominee caught up with the Governor Goodwin's party at Fort Larned in southwestern Kansas. They traveled along the Santa Fe Trail and reached Santa Fe, New Mexico on November 14 where they were welcomed by New Mexico Territory Governor Henry Connelly. Turner took his oath of office with the other territorial officials traveling together on December 29, 1863, during a snow-storm shrouded ceremony held at Navajo Springs. The ceremony officially establishing the new territory was to take place once they reached the territory, but because of uncertainty over the exact location of the border the party continued on to Navajo Springs which they knew was within the territory. Governor Goodwin established three judicial districts in an April 9, 1864 proclamation at the temporary territory capital of Fort Whipple at its original tent and log-cabin location at Del Rio Springs. Turner was assigned to the third district, which encompassed all of the territory north of the Gila River and east of the 114th meridian. This district comprised Yavapai County, which at the time was 65,000 sq mi (170,000 km^{2}) or 57% of the territory. Court was held at the county seat in Prescott, Arizona.

== Leave of absence ==
The new Chief Justice requested a four-month leave of absence on March 28, 1864, for the purpose of moving his wife to the territory. His initial plans to go to Iowa were modified on April 9 when the citizens of Fort Whipple selected Turner to represent Arizona at the 1864 Republican National Convention in Baltimore beginning June 7. Although he was representing the entire territory, there was not enough time to wait for statewide ratification before leaving in time to ensure his arrival before the start of the convention. He left Fort Whipple with a military escort on April 11 and arrived at Fort Wingate on May 9 on his way to Santa Fe where he would catch the stagecoach. Due to mail delays, formal approval for the leave did not arrive until after his departure. Following the convention, which renominated Abraham Lincoln for the presidency, Turner went from Baltimore to Washington, D.C. for several weeks where he lobbied for improved mail service for Arizona. In a June 17, 1864 letter, Turner reported to Territorial Secretary Richard C. McCormick that the necessary Congressional approval had been secured and that he would see the Postmaster General the next day to request expedited implementation of the approved legislation.

From Washington, Turner proceeded to New York City where he wrote a full column letter to the editor of The New York Tribune, printed on July 21, responding to a complaint from an anonymous person known only as "G." in Tucson claiming that Secretary McCormick had received a full year's salary prior to his arrival in Arizona, taking office, or doing any work of the secretary. Turner defended McCormick in his column and provided first hand information about the situation in the territory.

A proclamation by the governor on August 10, 1864 ordered proceedings to begin in Turner's district on the last Tuesday of September, months after the start in the other two districts owing to his prolonged absence from the Territory. Turner would not return by then.

Turner was back in Mount Vernon, Ohio when his leave expired. On October 12, 1864, he requested an extension to his leave until the first of the year which was granted by Attorney General Bates. Another extension request in January 1865, when he had returned to Washington, was denied. He had claimed that it was not possible to travel back to Arizona due to a lack of forage for the draft animals and difficulties with hostile Indians making travel too dangerous. He also argued, to no avail, that his absence in Arizona was being covered by Justice Allyn and that his assistance in Washington was required by territory delegate to the U.S. House of Representatives Charles D. Poston to aid in lobbying for the "interests of the territory". Despite lack of approval for the extension, Turner did not return to his duties until November 1865, twenty months after he left the territory.

During his absence, Associate Justice Allyn filled in for Turner during one judicial session while all other scheduled sessions were not held. It was originally expected that Judge Howell would hold court for Turner, but Howell too left Arizona, several months after Turner. Allyn was the only justice in the territory until Henry T. Backus arrived to replace Howell about the time Turner returned.

In September 1865, Governor Goodwin was elected the second territory delegate in Washington replacing Poston and, Secretary McCormick became acting governor. In his December 11, 1865 message to the 2nd Arizona Territorial Legislature, whose upper house members were ceremonially sworn in by Chief Justice Turner, McCormick noted that the Supreme Court would be "functioning normally" with all three justices present.

== Judgeship ==
Turner functioned as district judge over the third district, presiding over cases in both Territorial court, concerning matters of Arizona statutes, and federal court, concerning matters of the US Constitution and federal laws.

During his first district court session, the grand jurors came to court with their guns. Turner was apprehensive over the situation which was different from his experiences in eastern courts, but reluctantly swore them in. During session the next day, the jurors suddenly rushed out of the courtroom to attend to an Indian attack. After that, Turner brought his own firearms to court as well.

In December 1865, Turner instructed the jurors that prompt punishment of minor offenses, such as "violation of the public peace and tranquility, offenses against public morality and health, gambling, cheating, swindling, and fraud" would deter more serious crimes and stressed that under Arizona law, drunkenness "shall not be an excuse for any crime".

In addition to district judge, he presided as Chief Justice when three district justices met together as the Supreme Court to hear appeals from cases previously heard in district court, which occurred first in December 1865. The justice who presided over the original case was qualified to rehear the matter in the Supreme Court. The first Supreme court session selected a clerk, announced rules, and heard one case.

Between court sessions, Turner delivered political addresses in February and May 1866, although the topics are not known. Turner, a staunch Republican, was displeased with Governor McCormick, whose political allegiance had shifted from support for Lincoln to Johnson

In a letter to United States Secretary of the Interior James Harlan, Turner accused McCormick of appointing confederate sympathizers and copperheads to territorial offices instead of loyal union supporters. Although supporting McCormick's appointment to governor in 1865, by 1866 his position had changed. He felt McCormick was overly influenced by former Confederate King S. Woolsey. Turner also felt that McCormick unduly benefited from being the owner and controller of the Arizona Miner, published in the capital Prescott. Turner, a prohibitionist also disliked that McCormick offered whiskey to visitors to his office.

Turner's salary was $2,500 per year and he depended on outside business interests to supplement his income. Some of his business dealings resulted in personal litigation in his own court, where Justice Backus would preside in his place.

At the meeting of the 3rd Arizona Territorial Legislature in October 1866, Turner was not selected by the representatives to administer the oath of office to the speaker, as would have been customary. The second session of the Supreme Court was held later that month, and lasted about two weeks. Turner held district court in spring 1867, and presided over court in the second district at Hardyville in Mohave County as Allyn had returned to Connecticut after his first term and had not yet been replaced. That fall, Turner gave the customary oaths at the start of the 4th Arizona Territorial Legislature.

Turner presided over the third Supreme Court session in October 1867 which affirmed two appeals from the third district. The court was joined by Harley H. Carter from Michigan, the replacement for judge Allyn. The court also appointed US commissioners for each Arizona county and admitted John M. Roundtree to the bar.

That year the legislature moved the territory capital south to Tucson and although the chief justice would normally be located at the territory capital, Turner stayed in Prescott where he had a new home on Cortez street near the town plaza and business interests in the area, including 30 acres (12 ha) of wheat.

Turner was reappointed in 1868 by President Johnson with the backing of his friends back East along with the blessing of McCormick and other members of Arizona's "Federal cliche". Turner was supported by Coles Bashford, Arizona's third delegate to Congress and a friend of McCormick who pointed out that Turner planned to make Arizona his permanent home and brought his wife to the territory, proving he was not a carpetbagger. Turner also had the support of US Supreme Court chief justice Salmon P. Chase and justice Samuel F. Miller. The reappointment was approved by the U.S. Senate on February 6, 1868.

The 1868 session of the Supreme Court was held in Tucson without Turner who was probably busy in Prescott with district court cases. The court now had the authority, granted by Congress, to set their own schedule and the two attending judges made adjustments to avoid such conflicts in the future. However, in 1869 none of the three judges were available so no court was held that year.

== Downfall ==
Governor McCormick was elected the fourth delegate to Congress in the Territorial election of 1868 and returned East without an obvious successor. He sold the Arizona Miner, and John H. Marion became editor. Marion was a Democrat from Louisiana who sympathized with the south during reconstruction and quickly came to oppose Turner as a "radical" when mentioned as a possible successor to the governor's office in January 1869. Turner left on a trip that month to New Mexico but was expected to return by the time court resumed in April. Secretively, Turner was traveling outside the territory to seek appointment as governor. He had little support from influential Arizonans, only being endorsed by George W. Dent, brother-in-law of General Ulysses S. Grant and superintendent of Indian Affairs.

Supporters outside the territory included US Supreme Court justices Miller and Noah H. Swayne, future justice Stanley Matthews, Ohio governor Rutherford B. Hayes, Senator Benjamin F. Wade, and representatives James G. Blaine of Maine and William Windom of Minnesota. On March 5, 1869, West Point graduate and US Army Lt. Colonel John C. McFerra wrote to President Grant that Turner would be "a most excellent man for the position of Governor".

Turner suspected that due to his past relationship with delegate McCormick, McCormick might either be neutral or against him. McCormick in fact strongly supported Anson Safford, who had previously held minor positions in California and Nevada, and strongly advocated for him to incoming President Grant who would make the appointment. According to New Mexico Governor Robert B. Mitchell, McCormick, former Arizona governor Goodwin, and former Arizona delegate Bashford all recommended to Grant that Turner be kept on as Chief Justice.

Safford was nominated on April 3, 1869 and Turner immediately felt threatened. He had planned for his trip east by obtaining a formal leave of absence, and his opponent Marion of the Miner, unaware of the political nature of the trip, even reported that Turner had left to collect new settlers to the territory. Turner did bring sixteen settlers when he arrived back in Prescott on July 9, 1869.

Upon return, he faced a major judicial issue arising after Judge Backus ruled that many Territorial laws were invalid because the legislature was not legally apportioned. Resolution at the Supreme Court would be difficult, as Turner explained to AG E. Rockford Hoar, since Arizona had no law library as Congress had never appropriated funds to create one. Without the ability to research legal issue, justice was administered on "general principles". Some books were nevertheless purchased from district court fines at "unreasonable" prices in San Francisco, the only source in the western US.

In the fall of 1869, Turner gave jury instructions in his district court alleging widespread corruption in Arizona including in the Postal service, military, and state government. In early 1870, he was confronted by Major General Frank Wheaton who claimed Turner had accused military officials, including Wheaton, of fraud. Turner denied this, but Wheaton produced a copy of a letter Turner wrote to the Secretary of War with these claims.

The Miner stepped up the pressure, claiming in late February that a majority of Arizonans had "lost confidence" and "were tired" of Turner.

A December 10 petition for his removal to President Grant from Henry A. Bigelow, former governors Goodwin and McCormick, the newly appointed governor Safford (to whom Turner had lost in his bid for that post) said that Turner was "most obnoxious to the people of the 1st Judicial District, as a Judge, and prayed that he may be removed".

On February 12, 1870, he went to Washington to defend himself but could not counter strong opposition by the three most powerful political figures in Arizona. Goodwin called him "wholly incompetent", McCormick said he was absent excessively, and Safford said he was "wholly unqualified".

Back in Prescott on March 30, he put his defense in writing, justifying his 1864-5 absence and explaining that his late return in 1869 was beyond his control as no military escort was available. He noted that he was in the Territory the entire three years of 1866–8. Addressing other charges, he denied that he ever improperly directed work to any attorney and noted that none of his district court rulings had been reversed on appeal.

He denied charges of failing to pay debts and justified repaying some debt in gold instead of greenbacks. A salacious accusation was that a business partner name Ramos was a "low Mexican" whose white wife had once been married to a Negro. Turner countered that his low salary required him to seek other sources of income, farming was a respectable business, and that Ramos was "honest, industrious, and well-respected". One of Turner's opponents, Henry A. Bigelow, was also a partner with Ramos in another venture. When Ramos died in 1876, the Miner printed that he and his wife were "eminently respectable to all but the most highly prejudiced".

Turner reportedly complained to a newspaper editor in Los Angeles of his treatment by the Miner, and editor Marion responded in print on April 9 that "he had only told the truth".

On April 18, 1870, Turner was removed from office by President Grant before completing his second term when associate justice John Titus was appointed chief justice.

Turner heard of his removal while in session and immediately dismissed the court and announced "that he would forgive his enemies and remember his friends". The Miner printed that this was the remark of a "little man" who had few friends. Miner coverage of Turner then ceased, but the Tucson Citizen (controlled by foe McCormick) reported in November that Turner had left Arizona and followed up in the spring of 1871 that Turner was back East complaining about his treatment. In April, he sent a letter to Washington to be placed in his file "to set the record straight". Having sold his home in Prescott, he had accepted his removal.

While his removal was prompted by accusations of wrongdoing including excessive absence from his post, conducting business affairs on the side, borrowing gold and then repaying the debts in paper currency valued at par, giving partial rulings, and colluding with lawyers as they prepared cases, historian John S. Goff considers Turner to have been an able judge and attributes his removal to politics.

Goff said that Turner had been in conflict with the ruling "Federal" clique of state officials at the time. The Supreme Court, which met annually, did not convene for more than two years between November 1868 and January 1871 because of the deadlock. His removal was largely due to his rough personality and members of the Federal clique losing patience with him.

== Later life ==
After leaving Arizona, Turner moved his family to Coffeyville, Kansas where he practiced law there for a time before settling in Independence, Kansas. He partnering with William E. Otis in the legal firm of Turner and Otis and was successful, later adding a bank to the practice. He remained in this partnership (Turner & Otis) until October 1878.

Turner eventually suffered a financial reversal and lived his final years in poverty.

After leaving politics, Turner kept in touch with his friend, Rutherford B. Hayes, sending him a congratulatory note upon Hayes' election as president as well as condolences upon the death of his wife. He did not however ask Hayes for any appointment to a federal position.

His wife died on December 13, 1896, in a sanatorium in Columbus, Ohio but Turner was too ill to attend the funeral. He then moved to Indianapolis, Indiana where he lived with his brother Chauncey until he died on December 23, 1899. He was buried in an unmarked grave in Crown Hill Cemetery.

== Legacy ==
An envelope sent by Turner in March, 1864 to his wife in Mount Vernon, Ohio is the earliest known surviving item sent from the Arizona Territory. The letter went by Military Express from Fort Whipple to Tucson, then by Vedette Mail to Las Cruces, New Mexico Territory, and finally by regular U.S. Mail to Ohio. The envelope has a "United States Supreme Court, Arizona" imprint, a "Las Cruces N.M. March 26/64" postmark (handwritten), a 3¢ George Washington postage stamp, and is marked received on April 25.

Edmund W. Wells, who clerked for Turner and studied law from him was admitted to the bar and eventually became an Arizona supreme court justice himself. Wells went on to become Arizona's attorney general and the first Republican nominee for governor at statehood.
