= John J. Hawkins =

American jurist and politician (1855–1935)

John Jay Hawkins
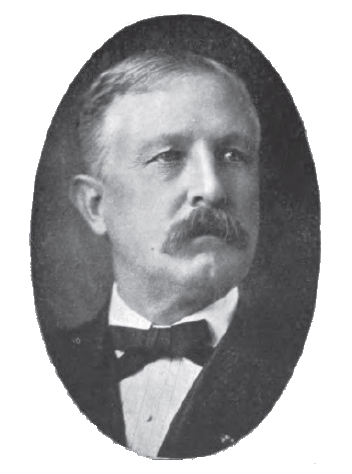

Associate Justice, Arizona Territorial Supreme Court
- In office April 19, 1893 – July 19, 1897
- Nominated by: Grover Cleveland
- Preceded by: Edmund W. Wells
- Succeeded by: Richard Elihu Sloan

Personal details
- Born: January 4, 1855 Saline County, Missouri
- Died: May 1, 1935 (aged 80) Los Angeles, California
- Party: Democratic
- Spouse: Olive Birch
- Profession: Attorney

John Jay Hawkins (January 4, 1855 – May 1, 1935) was an American jurist and politician who served as Associate Justices of the Supreme Court of Arizona Territory and as a member of the Arizona Territorial Legislature.

== Biography ==
Hawkins was born in Saline County, Missouri to George Scott and Francis Marion (Gauldin) Hawkins on January 4, 1855. He was educated in public schools before enrolling at William Jewell College and the University of Missouri. Upon completion of education in 1877, Hawkins began reading law under Glasgow, Missouri attorney Thomas Shackelford. He was admitted to the Missouri bar in 1878 and practiced law with Shackelford for the next five years.

In 1883, Hawkins moved to Prescott, Arizona Territory. He was made probate judge for Yavapai County in 1885. That same year he formed a legal practice with J. C. Herndon which lasted until 1893. On May 5, 1855, Hawkins married Olive Birch of Glasgow, Missouri. The marriage produced one daughter.

Hawkins was appointed Territorial Auditor in 1887. The Democratic Hawkins held the position till March 1889 when he was replaced by an incoming Republican governor. In 1892, Hawkins was elected to represent Yavapai County on the Council of the 17th Arizona Territorial Legislature.

President Grover Cleveland nominated Hawkins to replace Edmund W. Wells in Arizona's fourth judicial district in April 1893, and he took his oath of office on April 19, 1893. During his time on the bench, procedural issues were common. Two examples of his rulings in such manners are Thomas v. Lane, 4 Arizona 156 (1894), where the judge rules that when counsel claims an error in a case they should also specify what they believed the error to be and United States v. Falshaw, 4 Arizona 330 (1895), when he ruled the United States was required to pay witness expenses on behalf of indigent defendants. At the end of his four-year term, Hawkins was not reappointed and was succeeded by Richard Elihu Sloan on July 19, 1897.

Following his time on the bench, Hawkins returned to his private legal practice. In addition to his legal career, he was an active member of the Episcopal Church, serving once as Chancellor of the denomination's territorial mission board and two times as a Lay Delegate to the General Convention. Hawkins was also a member of Prescott's Masonic Lodge.

Hawkins served as President of the territorial bar association from 1900 till 1901. In 1904, he was a delegate to the Universal Congress of Lawyers and Jurists. Following Arizona gaining statehood, in 1914, Hawkins ran for one of three open seats on the Arizona Supreme Court but failed to gain one with his fourth-place finish. The following year he taught mining law at the University of Oklahoma College of Law.

Hawkings retired to Los Angeles, California in 1916. He lived there till his death on May 1, 1935. Hawkins was buried in Glendale, California's Forest Lawn Memorial Park.
