= Clifton Mathews =

American judge (1880–1962)

Senior Judge of the United States Court of Appeals for the Ninth Circuit
- In office June 30, 1953 – September 7, 1962

Judge of the United States Court of Appeals for the Ninth Circuit
- In office March 23, 1935 – June 30, 1953
- Appointed by: Franklin D. Roosevelt
- Preceded by: William Henry Sawtelle
- Succeeded by: James Alger Fee

Personal details
- Born: Clifton Mathews; February 12, 1880 Concord, Georgia, U.S.
- Died: September 7, 1962 (aged 82)
- Education: read law

Clifton Mathews (February 12, 1880 – September 7, 1962) was a United States circuit judge of the United States Court of Appeals for the Ninth Circuit.

== Education and career ==
Born in Concord, Georgia, Matthews read law to enter the bar in 1904. He entered private practice in Farmerville, Louisiana between 1904 and 1912. He was later in private practice in Roswell, New Mexico between 1913 and to 1915, then in Bisbee, Arizona until 1920, and then in Globe, Arizona until 1933. He was a special assistant to the Attorney General of Arizona between 1929 and 1931 and then served as the United States Attorney for the District of Arizona between 1933 and 1935.

== Federal judicial service ==
Mathews was nominated by President Franklin D. Roosevelt on March 13, 1935, to a seat on the United States Court of Appeals for the Ninth Circuit vacated by Judge William Henry Sawtelle. He was confirmed by the United States Senate on March 20, 1935, and received his commission on March 23, 1935. He assumed senior status on June 30, 1953. Mathews served in that capacity until his death on September 7, 1962.

== Sources ==
Legal offices
Preceded by William Henry Sawtelle	Judge of the United States Court of Appeals for the Ninth Circuit; 1935–1953	Succeeded by James Alger Fee
