= Senator Tweedy =

Senator Tweedy may refer to:

- Alfred Tweedy (1880–?), Connecticut State Senate
- Samuel Tweedy (1776–1868), Connecticut State Senate

== See also ==
- Senator Tweed (disambiguation)
