= Eugene A. Tucker =

American jurist (1856–1942)

Associate Justice, Arizona Territorial Supreme Court
- In office April 1, 1905 – October 13, 1905
- Nominated by: Theodore Roosevelt
- Preceded by: George Russell Davis
- Succeeded by: Frederick S. Nave

Personal details
- Born: Eugene Adelmer Tucker; May 13, 1856 Homer, New York
- Died: December 28, 1942 (aged 86) Culver City, California
- Party: Republican
- Spouse: Alfaretta Bristol
- Profession: Attorney

Eugene Adelmer Tucker (May 13, 1856 – December 28, 1942) was an American attorney and politician who served as an associate justice of the Arizona Territorial Supreme Court. Shortly after graduation, he moved to Humboldt, Nebraska where he held a number of elected positions including city mayor and Nebraska State Senator. Soon after his appointment to the Arizona court, Tucker faced allegations of wrongdoing that forced him to resign several months after joining the bench.

== Biography ==
Tucker was born on May 13, 1856, to Pliny T. and Delia Ann (Stone) Tucker in Homer, New York. His family moved to Belvidere where the younger Tucker was educated in local schools. He also read law under a Wisconsin judge before graduating from the University of Wisconsin Law School in 1878. Following graduation, Tucker worked briefly as a lawyer before moving to Humboldt, Nebraska in 1879. Tucker married Alfaretta Bristol of Rock Prairie, Wisconsin. The union produced two children: George Eugene and Blanche May.

In Nebraska, Tucker became involved in Republican politics. Active locally, he was a police judge, city clerk, city and county attorney before serving one term as mayor of Humboldt. Tucker was a delegate to the 1900 Republican National Convention and was elected to the Nebraska State Senate. Fraternally, Tucker was a member of the Knights of Pythias and served the group as a chancellor commander.

President Theodore Roosevelt nominated Tucker to replace Justice George Russell Davis on February 11, 1905. The nomination was based primarily upon a recommendation from United States Senator Elmer Burkett of Nebraska. While he was nominated to serve in the first district, a reorganization of the court in March 1905 moved Tucker to the newly created fifth district. He took his oath of office on April 1 with his court, which covered Gila and Graham counties, being located in Globe.

Tucker wrote no opinions in the Arizona Reports as he did not hold office long enough to serve during a session of the territorial supreme court. He did however serve during a session of his district court. Shortly after he took the bench, the Department of Justice allegedly received a photograph showing the new justice smoking a cigar with his feet resting upon a bench while court was in session. In August 1905, the justice department began an investigation and a variety of allegations were made against Tucker. Unofficial reports indicate the investigation found sufficient evidence to recommend Tucker's removal. Senator Burkett tried to intervene on Tucker's behalf. This allowed the judge to finish the court session that was underway at the time the justice department recommended his removal. Tucker submitted his resignation on October 13, 1905.

Tucker was admitted to the Arizona Territory bar on November 17, 1905. He moved to Los Angeles, and was admitted to the California bar on November 27, 1911. In 1939, Tucker's wife died. Tucker died at his home in Culver City, California on December 28, 1942. He was the last Arizona Territorial Supreme Court justice to die and the oldest surviving member from the 1878 University of Wisconsin graduating class.
