= Edmund W. Wells =

American jurist, businessman, and politician (1846–1938)

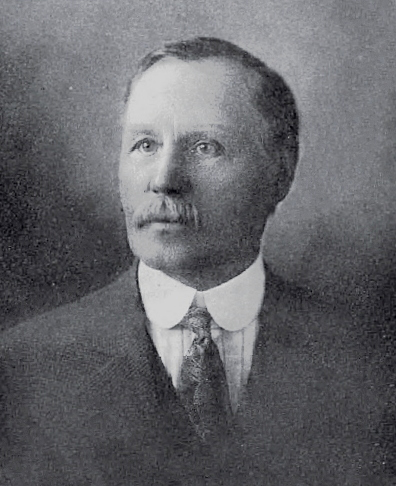

Associate Justice, Arizona Territorial Supreme Court
- In office March 5, 1891 – March 6, 1893
- Nominated by: Benjamin Harrison
- Preceded by: seat created
- Succeeded by: John J. Hawkins

Personal details
- Born: February 14, 1846 Lancaster, Ohio, U.S.
- Died: July 4, 1938 (aged 92) San Diego, California, U.S.
- Party: Republican
- Profession: Attorney

Edmund William Wells (February 14, 1846 – July 4, 1938) was an American jurist, businessman, and politician. Known as "Arizona's first millionaire", he was considered the richest man in Arizona during his attempt to be elected Governor of Arizona. He served as Attorney General of the Arizona Territory before being appointed as a judge. He also served as a member of Arizona's constitutional convention.

== Background ==
Wells was born to Edmund William and May Louise (Arnold) Wells on February 14, 1846, near Lancaster, Ohio. In 1852, his family moved to Oskaloosa, Iowa, where he attended public schools. Following his mother's death when he was sixteen, Wells and his father traveled to Pike's Peak Country to prospect for gold. Failing to find riches, the pair moved south and arrived in Prescott, Arizona Territory on July 6, 1864. The senior Wells was appointed alcalde by Governor John N. Goodwin while the younger Wells worked a series of clerk positions. The list of clerking positions included work for the 1st and 2nd territorial legislatures, the U.S. Army, Chief Justice William F. Turner, and the county board of supervisors. In 1870, Wells was elected county recorder and he also served as United States commissioner from 1871 to 1875.

Wells married Rosiland Gertrude Banghart on October 5, 1869. The couple had six children, one who died in childhood. As a result of the marriage, Wells became the brother-in-law to newspaperman John H. Marion and to Governor Oakes Murphy. The Wells were founding members of Prescott's First Church of Christ, Science.

== Early career ==
Wells was admitted to the bar in 1873, having studied the law under Justice William F. Turner. This was followed in 1875 with his election as Yavapai county attorney. The year also saw Wells form a law partnership with John A. Rush. The law practice operated until 1887 when Wells developed eye problems forcing him to get rest. As a result of the eye problems, he dissolved his law practice with Rush and effectively stopped practicing law.

In addition to his legal practice, Wells developed interests in cattle ranching, mining, and real estate. In 1882 he purchased a portion of the Bank of Arizona, a firm he served as vice president of from 1883 till 1911 and as president from 1911 till 1928. The growth of these business interests were such that Wells was occasionally called "Arizona's first millionaire" and by the time the territory gained statehood he was believed to be the richest man in Arizona.

In 1879, Wells was elected as a member of the council (upper house) in the 10th Arizona Territorial Legislature. He earned a second term on the Council in 1883 when he was elected to the 12th Arizona Territorial Legislature. During the administration of President Chester A. Arthur, Wells was appointed an Assistant United States Attorney. In 1887, he served on commission that helped revise territorial statutes.

== Associate justice ==
Wells took his oath of office as an Associate Justice to the Arizona Territorial Supreme Court on March 5, 1891. He was appointed to the newly created 4th district by President Benjamin Harrison and his nomination was supported by U.S. Senator William B. Allison of Iowa, Supreme Court Associate Justice Stephen J. Field, Arizona Territorial Governors Richard C. McCormick, Anson P. K. Safford, and Lewis Wolfley, Arizona Territorial Justices Charles G. W. French and William W. Porter, Arizona Territorial Secretary John J. Gosper, and Oakes Murphy. His district covered Apache, Coconino, Mohave, and Yavapai counties.

During his service as a judge, Wells ruled on about a dozen cases that were recording in Arizona Reports. Among his rulings was the finding in Yavapai County v. O'Neill, 3 Arizona 363, (1892), that Sheriff Buckey O'Neill did not have to make an arrest to receive mileage expenses but merely had to make a good faith effort to effect one. In Reilly v. Atchison, 4 Arizona 72, (1892), the judge upheld an appellate court ruling stating that an attorney's claim that an error was located between page 13 through 18 of a transcript was not specific enough to show that said error existed. Wells submitted his resignation on March 6, 1893, claiming "business matters require my attention" and asking for a replacement to be quickly appointed.

== Later life ==
Following his time on the bench Wells was appointed Attorney General of Arizona Territory by Governor Brodie, a position he held from August 2, 1902, to November 14, 1904. In 1910, he was chosen to represent Yavapai county in Arizona's constitutional convention. At the beginning of the convention, Wells was nominated by fellow republicans to be President of the convention but failed to gain the position. He instead worked on the Committee on Style, Revision, and Compilation assisting the committee chairman, Michael Cunniff, with final wording of the constitution. Despite having worked on it extensively, at the end of the convention Wells refused to sign due to what he viewed as radical features in the final document.

When elections were called, Wells received the Republican nomination to be Arizona's first state Governor. He was then defeated on December 12, 1911, by George W. P. Hunt with an 11,123 to 9,166 vote differential. From 1918 to 1925, Wells served as a regent for the University of Arizona.

After retiring from his position at the Bank of Arizona, Wells wrote Argonaut Tales, a book about his early experiences, and donated the book royalties to the Prescott chapter of the Boy Scouts. His wife died on May 14, 1922, and he lived with one of his children in Phoenix before moving to San Diego, California to live with another of his children. Wells died in San Diego on July 4, 1938, and was entombed in his family mausoleum at Mountain View Cemetery in Prescott.

Party political offices
First	Republican nominee for Governor of Arizona; 1911	Succeeded by Ralph H. Cameron
