= John Titus (jurist) =

American jurist (1812–1876)

Chief Justice, Arizona Territorial Supreme Court
- In office June 1, 1870 – July 6, 1874
- Nominated by: Ulysses S. Grant
- Preceded by: William F. Turner
- Succeeded by: Edmund Francis Dunne

Chief Justice, Utah Territorial Supreme Court
- In office May 6, 1863 – January 1868
- Nominated by: Abraham Lincoln
- Preceded by: John F. Kinney
- Succeeded by: Charles C. Wilson

Associate Justice, Arizona Territorial Supreme Court
- In office October 30, 1869 – June 1, 1870
- Nominated by: Ulysses S. Grant
- Preceded by: Henry T. Backus
- Succeeded by: Charles Austin Tweed

Personal details
- Born: August 12, 1812 Bucks County, Pennsylvania
- Died: October 16, 1876 (aged 64) Tucson, Arizona
- Party: Whig/Republican
- Spouse: Martha (Shaw) Buck
- Profession: Attorney

John Titus (August 12, 1812 – October 16, 1876) was an American attorney and jurist. He served as chief justice of the Supreme Courts of both Utah and Arizona Territory.

== Background ==
Titus was born on August 12, 1812, to William and Mary (Torens) Titus in Bucks County, Pennsylvania. In addition to a strict fear of God instilled by his Presbyterian parents, he was educated in the Doylestown public schools, Lane Theological Seminary, and Washington College, Pennsylvania, before graduating from a law course at Transylvania University in 1837.

In 1840, Titus was admitted to the Pennsylvania bar. He practiced law in Bucks County before moving to Philadelphia in 1842. In 1843, Titus married widow Martha (Shaw) Buck. The marriage produced two children: Henry C. and Amanda W. Titus

In addition to practicing law in Philadelphia, Titus argued several cases before the Supreme Court of the United States. During the 1850s he had become involved with the Know Nothing Party and ran for the Philadelphia Court of Common Pleas, losing his bid by one vote.

== Utah Territory ==
By 1861 Titus was active in Republican politics and had become a friend of United States Secretary of War Simon Cameron. He began lobbying for a government position and following passage of the Arizona Organic Act was nominated to become United States Attorney for the newly formed territory. Following confirmation, Titus resigned before taking up the position and was shortly thereafter nominated to replace John F. Kinney as Chief Justice of the Utah Territorial Supreme Court. The newly appointed judge was commissioned on May 6, 1863.

While serving on the Utah bench, Titus followed a middle course between anti-Mormon interests and the LDS Church. Family tradition claims that the judge told Brigham Young, "I am on this Bench to see that justice is done; when the Mormons have justice on their side they will get it, and when the Gentiles have justice on their side, they will get it." As a result of this outlook, Titus gained a reputation as an impartial and able justice. When his term ended in January 1868, Titus returned to his private law practice in Philadelphia.

== Arizona Territory ==
In early 1869, Titus again sought appointment to a Federal position. Based upon the recommendation of Richard C. McCormick, John N. Goodwin, and Coles Bashford, and due to his being the only candidate for the position, Titus was nominated to replace Henry T. Backus as Associate Justice of the Arizona Territorial Supreme Court. President Ulysses S. Grant made the nomination on March 15, 1869.

When Titus left for Arizona Territory, he left his wife and family in Philadelphia. He arrived in Prescott on October 30, 1869, along with territorial governor Anson P. K. Safford and territorial secretary Coles Bashford. The new judge arrived in Tucson two days after his October court session was scheduled to begin. As per the rules in place at the time, the session was thus not held. In following years he would hold court twice per year, with sessions beginning on the first Monday of both March and October. Each session would begin with hearing of Federal cases. After all Federal issues were resolved, the court would then switch to hearing matters of Territorial law. In addition to these two sessions, all the Territorial Supreme Court justices would meet in the capital once per year to act as an appeals court.

Titus was promoted to Chief Justice on April 18, 1870, replacing William F. Turner. He took his oath of office on June 1. Initial speculation was that Titus would move to Prescott, where the former chief justice had presided, but the new chief justice chose to remain in Tucson, which was the territorial capital at the time.

Judge Titus generally conducted matters of the court in an efficient and professional manner. There were, however, two notable exceptions. The first began shortly after Titus' promotion to Chief Justice when Milton B. Duffield, Arizona Territory's first United States Marshal, appeared before the court on an assault charge. During the course of the proceedings, the judge ordered the defendant to surrender his pistol. Duffield refused to disarm himself. While the accused was brandishing his firearm, the prosecutor drew his gun, pressed it to the former marshal's head, and pulled the trigger. After the prosecutor's weapon failed to fire, Titus called for a recess. When court resumed, Duffield appeared unarmed but was outraged that Titus refused to consider charges against the prosecutor, ruling the attorney's actions would have been justified if his weapon had fired. Following the incident, Duffield held a grudge against Titus and engaged in an unsuccessful but persistent effort to have the judge removed from office.

The second unusual incident came during the Camp Grant massacre's legal proceedings. Outrage at the April 1871 killing of over 80 Apaches peacefully encamped at the military camp near Tucson was felt as far away as Washington, D.C., with Federal officials threatening to place the territory under martial law if the attackers were not indicted. A grand jury was impaneled, which returned indictments against 100 men. The trial began on December 6, with both the defense and prosecution having agreed to try one of the leaders, Sidney R. DeLong, and have his fate determine the guilt of the other defendants. Titus was supportive of DeLong and used his discretion to help ensure a not guilty verdict. The defense did not contest the claim that DeLong had participated in the attack, but instead dwelt on the history of Apache attacks that had occurred in southern Arizona Territory over the previous months. When Titus gave his instructions to the jury, they included directions that "murderous intent" could not be proven if the defendants felt an "irresistible apprehension of danger to them or theirs from Apache attacks" or by "such a sense of intolerable suffering as impelled them in spite of themselves to make the attack . . .?" Following the judge's instructions, the jury needed only nineteen minutes to acquit the defendants.

During his tenure, Titus made several rulings with long-term impact. The first came during the January 1872 appellate session with United States v. Certain Property and William Bichard & Co., 1 Arizona 31 (1872). The case involved an instance in which the United States government had confiscated property from the Bichard brothers' trading post located near an Indian reservation. Titus' opinion determined that the Federal government's ability to regulate commerce on the reservation did not extend to areas outside the reservation. A second important ruling came with Campbell v. Shivers, 1 Arizona 161 (1874), which dealt with the judiciary's ability to set the time for court sessions. Titus ruled that a judge had the sole right to set the date, but a compromise was made whereby the territorial legislature would choose a date that was then ratified by the courts.

News that Titus was being replaced as Chief Justice by Edmund Francis Dunne arrived several days after the start of his March 1874 court session. Titus left the bench following the completion of his four-year term of office.

== Later life ==
After leaving the bench, Titus remained in Tucson, where he returned to private practice and formed a partnership with L. C. Hughes. The influence of Hughes' Democratic politics caused concern for the predominantly Republican territorial leadership when Titus was considered for reappointment following the removal of Chief Justice Dunne. The former Chief Justice was not, however, renominated.

Titus died from typhoid fever on October 16, 1876, in Tucson. In addition to his funeral service, territorial courts held memorial services for the former Chief Justice during their next scheduled sessions. His body was moved from its Tucson grave to Doylestown, Pennsylvania's Presbyterian Churchyard one and one-half years later.
