= Bar (law) =

Legal profession as an institution

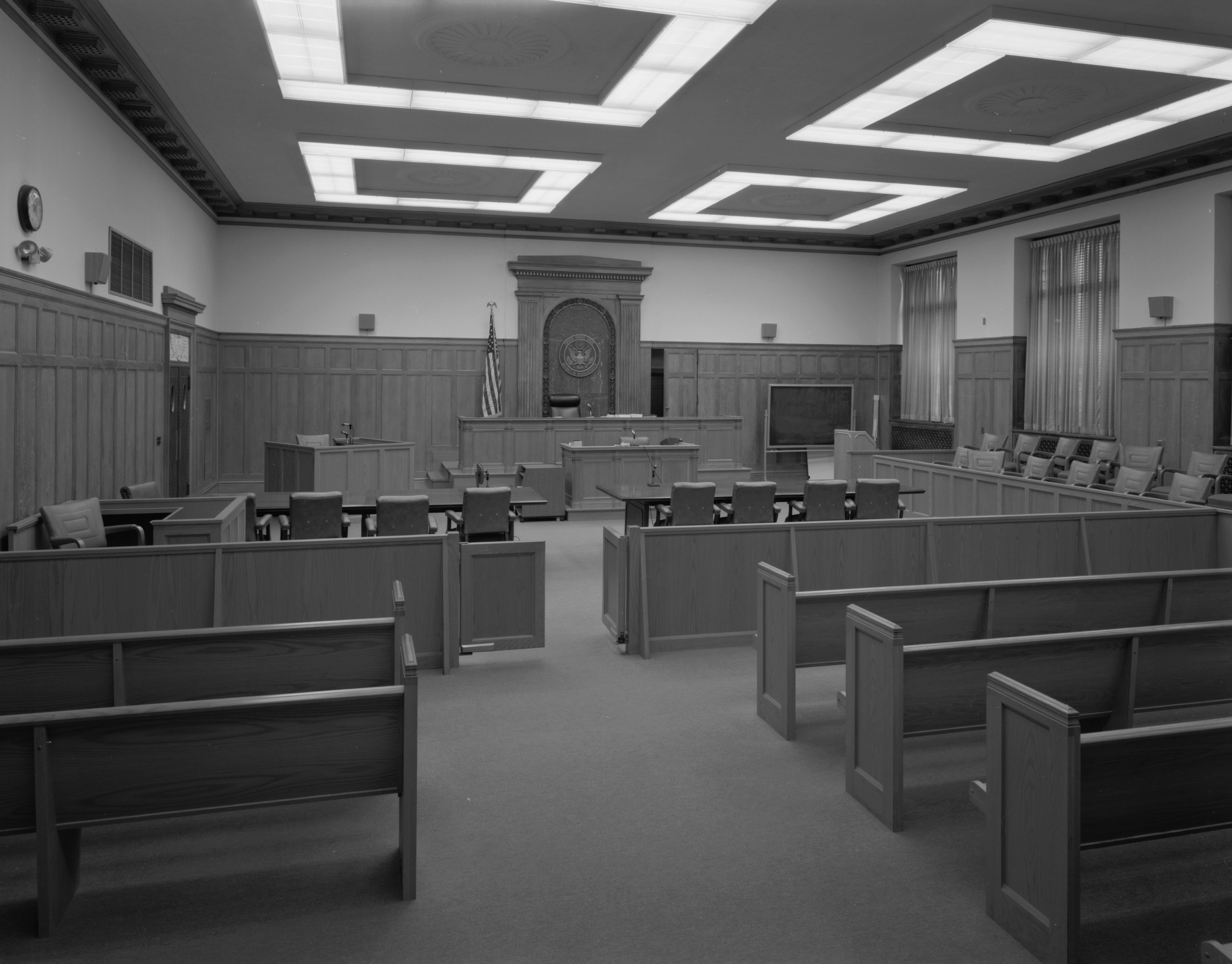
In this courtroom in Worcester, Massachusetts (United States), the bar is represented by a physical barrier (with swinging gate doors), separating the benches reserved for spectators from the judge's bench and lawyers' tables.

In law, the bar is the legal profession as an institution. The term is a metonym for the line (or "bar") that separates the parts of a courtroom reserved for spectators and those reserved for those who may address the court in a legal proceeding such as lawyers.

In the United Kingdom, the term "the bar" refers only to the professional organization for barristers (referred to in Scotland as advocates); the other type of UK lawyer, solicitors, have their own body, the Law Society. Correspondingly, being "called to the bar" refers to admission to the profession of barristers, not solicitors. Some other jurisdictions make no such distinction and all lawyers for admission may be said to be, called to the bar.

== Courtroom division ==
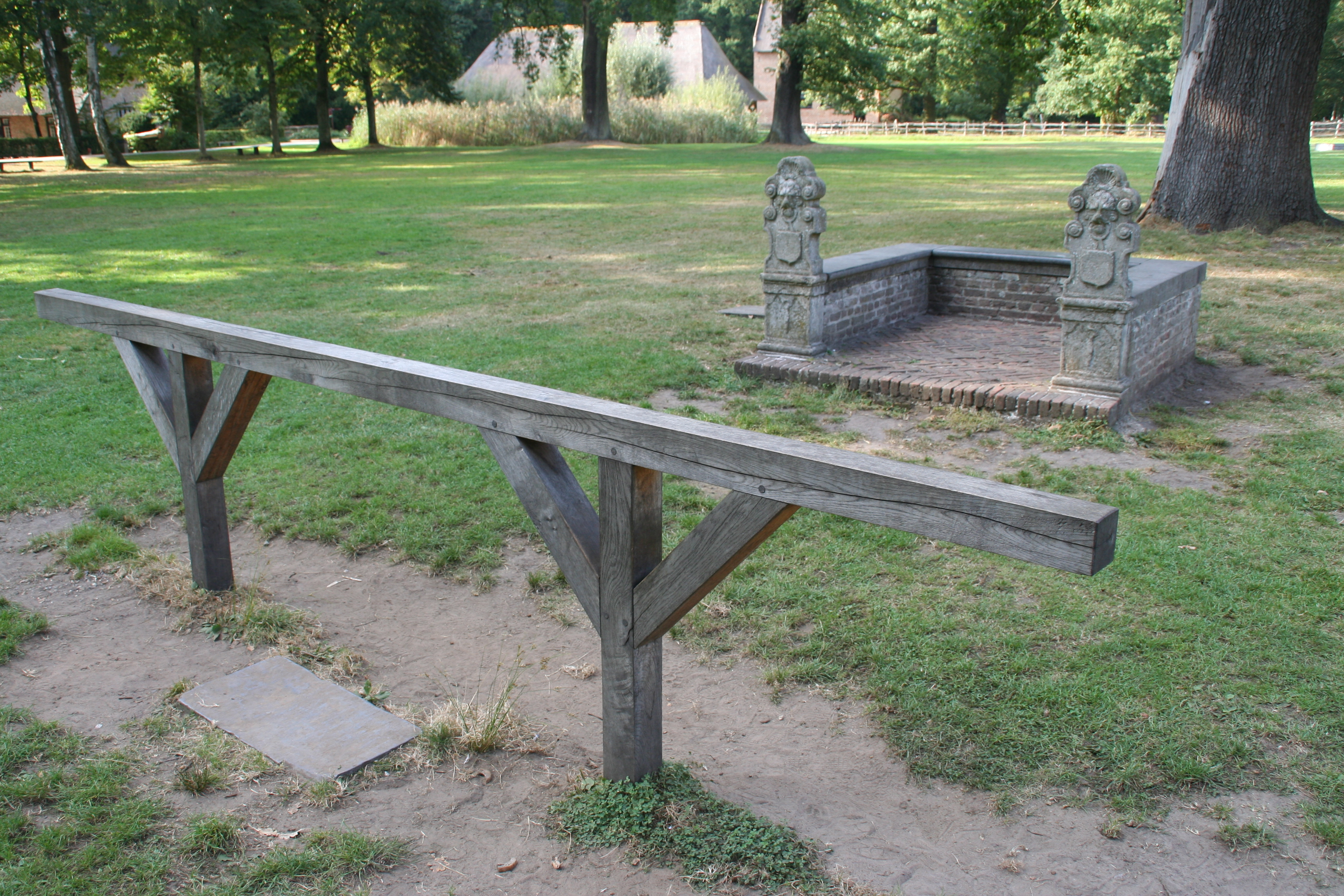
The wooden bar in front of the magistrate's bench in an 18th-century outdoor courtroom in Belgium

The origin of the term bar is from the barring furniture dividing a medieval European courtroom, which defined the areas restricted to lawyers and court personnel from which the general public was excluded. Within most modern courts of the U.S., Europe and many other countries, the bar continues to be represented by a physical partition, such as a railing or barrier. The area behind the bar is open to the public. This restriction is enforced in nearly all courts.

== License and certification ==
The bar may also refer to the qualifying procedure by which a lawyer is licensed to practice law in a given jurisdiction.

=== U.S. procedure ===
In the United States, this procedure is administered by the individual U.S. states and their respective bar associations. In general, a candidate must graduate from a qualified law school and pass a written test: the bar examination. Almost all states use the Multistate Bar Examination (MBE), a multiple-choice exam administered on one day of a two- or three-day test. An increasing number use the Uniform Bar Examination, which includes the MBE. In either case, on days during which the MBE is not administered, the bar exam may include questions related to that state's laws. If the candidate reaches the score required by a particular state, the candidate is then admitted to the bar. A lawyer whose license to practice law is revoked is said to be disbarred.

State bar associations may set additional requirements to bar admission such as trial and court observations, character and background screenings, or an additional examination on professional ethics.

==== U.S. patent procedure ====
Admission to practice before the patent section of the United States Patent and Trademark Office (USPTO) requires that the individual pass a separate, single-day examination administered by that agency. This test is typically referred to as the "patent bar", although the word "bar" does not appear in the test's official name.

Unlike the general bar examination, for which graduation from a recognized law school is a prerequisite, the USPTO exam does not require that the candidate have taken any law school courses. Instead, the main prerequisite is a science or engineering background, most often met with a bachelor's degree in a relevant field. Individuals who pass the examination are referred to as "patent attorneys" if they have an active law license from any U.S. jurisdiction, and "patent agents" otherwise. Attorneys and agents have the same license to represent clients before the patent section of the USPTO, and both may issue patentability opinions. However, any other patent-related practice (such as licensing or infringement litigation) can only be performed by licensed attorneys—who do not necessarily have to be USPTO-licensed.

=== British procedure ===
In the United Kingdom, the practice of law is divided between barristers (advocates in Scotland) and solicitors; advocacy before a court is almost always carried out by barristers (or advocates). A person who becomes an advocate or barrister is referred to as being called to the bar. In the UK, there is a distinction between the inner bar (for senior King's counsel) and the outer bar (for Junior barristers).

== The legal profession ==
The bar commonly refers to the legal profession as a whole. With a modifier, it may refer to a branch or division of the profession: as, for instance, the tort bar—lawyers who specialize in filing civil suits for damages.

In conjunction with bench, bar may differentiate lawyers who represent clients (the bar) from judges or members of a judiciary (the bench). In this sense, the bar advocates and the bench adjudicates. Yet, in some countries, judges who previously worked as lawyers representing clients commonly remain members of the bar and lawyers are commonly referenced as Officers of the Court.

The phrase bench and bar denotes all judges and lawyers collectively.

== See also ==
- Admission to practice law
- Admission to the bar in the United States
- Bar association
- Bench (law)
- Call to the bar
- Courtroom
