= Charles Austin Tweed =

American jurist and politician (1813–1887)

Associate Justice, Arizona Territorial Supreme Court
- In office August 12, 1870 – May 1878
- Nominated by: Ulysses S. Grant
- Preceded by: John Titus
- Succeeded by: Charles Silent

Member of the Florida Senate from the 2nd district
- In office 1848–1848

Member of the California Senate from the 20th district
- In office 1867–1870
- Preceded by: James E. Hale
- Succeeded by: Jacob H. Neff

Personal details
- Born: December 24, 1813 South Reading, Massachusetts
- Died: July 22, 1887 (aged 73) San Francisco, California
- Party: Whig/Republican
- Spouses: Ruth Green (m. 1836; died 1871) Minnie A. Jackson (m. 1875; died 1877) Marcia C. Lewis (m. 1878)
- Profession: Attorney

Charles Austin Tweed (December 24, 1813 – July 22, 1887) was an American politician and jurist. During his early career he was elected to the Florida Senate and California State Senate. Tweed then moved to Arizona Territory and was appointed to serve two terms as an associate justice of the Arizona Territorial Supreme Court.

== Background ==
Tweed was born in South Reading, Massachusetts, to Joshua and Elizabet (Pratt) Tweed on December 24, 1813, the youngest of four sons. His father was a shoemaker and influential member of the community. He received a liberal education that included a study of the law.

Shortly after he was admitted to the Massachusetts bar, he moved to Florida in the hope it would help his first wife's health. There in 1848, as a member of the Whig Party, he was elected to a single term in the Florida Senate.

== California ==
In late 1849 Tweed joined the California Gold Rush, traveling in a group that crossed from Veracruz, Veracruz to San Blas Atempa before continuing north to California. After setting up a legal practice in Sacramento, he was elected a member of the city council on April 1, 1850. Following Sacramento, Tweed moved and lived for a time in Auburn, Dutch Flat, and Nevada City. In 1859, he moved to Charlestown, Massachusetts but returned to Nevada City in 1862.

Running as a Republican, Tweed was elected district Attorney of Placer County in 1863. In 1867 he was a delegate to the California Republican Convention. Later that year, Tweed won election to the California State Senate, representing Placer County for two consecutive terms. There he became a leader of the Radical Republicans. Tweed was also an advocate of women's rights. On January 10, 1870, the Republican senator introduced a bill that would allow the state to hire women for the same wages offered to their male coworkers. The bill was defeated in a senate vote of 15–21. Later that session Tweed submitted a petition to amend the state constitution to grant women's suffrage. He was appointed chairman of a special committee established to investigate the possibility. Although the committee reported favorably, the proposal was defeated by a vote of 23–47.

== Arizona Territory ==
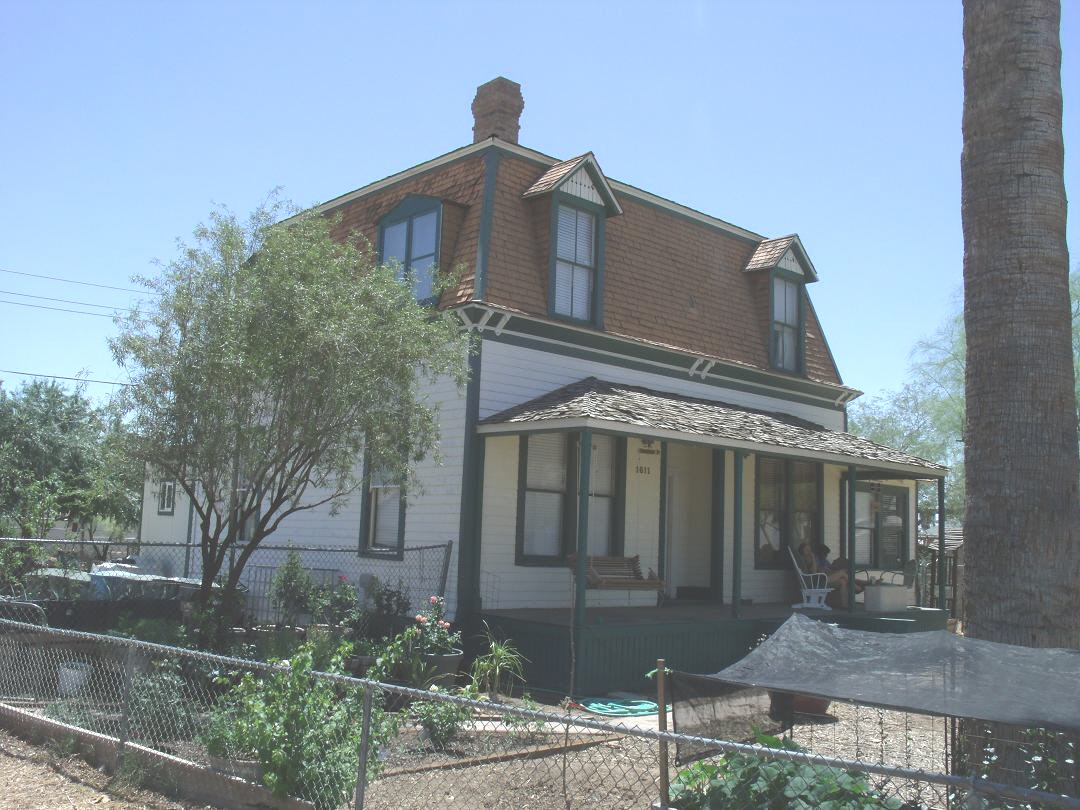
The "Judge Charles A. Tweed House", built in 1880 and located at 1611 W. Filmore St.

On April 14, 1870, following Judge John Titus' promotion to Chief Justice, Tweed was appointed an Associate Justice to the Arizona Territorial Supreme Court. The new justice moved to Prescott and took his oath of office on August 12, 1870. He presided over his first district court session on October 3, 1870. Press reports of the new justice's performance were favorable with one newspaper reporting, "Judge Tweed has gained the confidence of the people ... by giving the law a literal construction and showing a disposition to get at the rights of matters, irrespective of technicalities." On October 2, 1871, Tweed's first wife, Ruth G., died.

The 1871 session of the Arizona Territorial Legislature created Maricopa County and placed it within Tweed's judicial district. Early in 1872, Tweed moved to the seat of the new county, Phoenix. There he purchased some land where members of his family grew alfalfa, corn, peaches, and operated a dairy farm. In addition to his judicial duties, Tweed became active in early efforts to use the Salt River for irrigation. On March 31, 1875, Tweed married Minnie A. Jackson. The marriage ended with her death on March 14, 1877. Judge Tweed's third marriage came on March 20, 1878 when he wed Marcia C. Lewis of San Francisco.

In Phoenix, Judge Tweed remained as popular as he had been in Prescott. As a result, he was appointed to a second term in March 1874. This term saw charges raised against the judge, possibly by unhappy litigants, that Tweed drank to excess and had become old and feeble. Territorial Governors Anson P.K. Safford, John Philo Hoyt, Chief Justice C. G. W. French, and Edmund W. Wells were among Tweed's defenders and the charges were dismissed in 1876. The claims may however have influenced President Rutherford B. Hayes to not appoint Tweed to a third term in 1878.

After leaving the bench, Tweed moved to Mineral Park and served as counsel for a mining company. In November 1878 he was elected Mohave County attorney beginning in January the next year. Tweed resigned in mid-1880 to return to Phoenix. There he made unsuccessful runs to become Maricopa County attorney in 1880 and 1882. The judge's later years were spent in a law partnership with William A. Hancock.

Tweed had been in declining health for years. In early 1887, he traveled to San Francisco to seek medical treatment. The treatment was unable to reverse his problems and Tweed died on July 22, 1887.
