= Richard Elihu Sloan =

American judge (1857–1933)

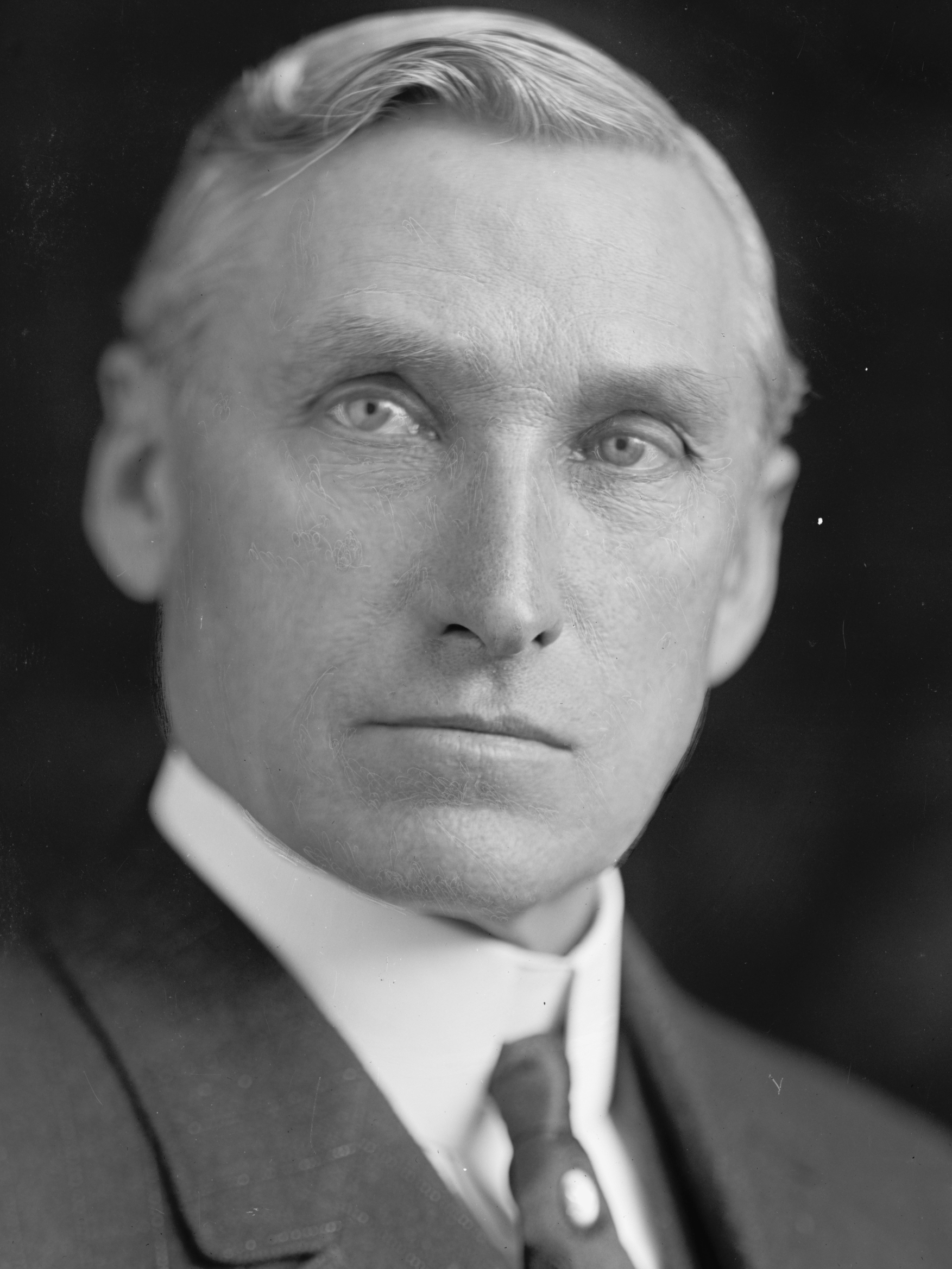

Judge of the United States District Court for the District of Arizona
- In office August 26, 1912 – March 3, 1913
- Appointed by: William Howard Taft
- Preceded by: Seat established by 36 Stat. 557
- Succeeded by: William Henry Sawtelle

17th Territorial Governor of Arizona
- In office May 1, 1909 – February 14, 1912
- Appointed by: William Howard Taft
- Preceded by: Joseph Henry Kibbey
- Succeeded by: George W. P. Hunt (as Governor of Arizona)

Associate Justice of the Arizona Territorial Supreme Court
- In office July 19, 1897 – May 1, 1909
- Appointed by: William McKinley
- Preceded by: John J. Hawkins
- Succeeded by: Edward M. Doe
- In office November 2, 1889 – June 1, 1894
- Appointed by: Benjamin Harrison
- Preceded by: William H. Barnes
- Succeeded by: Joseph D. Bethune

Personal details
- Born: Richard Elihu Sloan; June 22, 1857 Morning Sun, Ohio, U.S.
- Died: December 13, 1933 (aged 76) Phoenix, Arizona, U.S.
- Resting place: Greenwood Memorial Park; Phoenix, Arizona
- Party: Republican
- Education: Monmouth College (A.B.); Cincinnati Law School (LL.B.)

Richard Elihu Sloan (June 22, 1857 – December 13, 1933) was an American jurist and politician, who served as associate justice of the Arizona Territorial Supreme Court, a United States district judge of the United States District Court for the District of Arizona and as the 17th and final Governor of Arizona Territory. As an Associate Justice he served for 16 years, the longest service of any member of the Arizona Territorial Supreme Court, and wrote over 150 legal opinions. As Governor he oversaw Arizona's transition from territory to statehood.

== Background ==
Sloan was born on June 22, 1857, in Morning Sun, Preble County, Ohio, to Mary (Caldwell) and Dr. Richard E. Sloan. His family had moved to Ohio from South Carolina owing to their opposition to the secession movement and slavery. Sloan was educated in private and public schools and graduated from Monmouth College (Illinois) with an Artium Baccalaureus degree in 1877. Following graduation he taught in a private school for a year.

Near the time of his college graduation, one of Sloan's older brothers died of quick consumption. When he developed asthma and hay fever, his family became concerned and sent him to Denver, Colorado, hoping the change of climate would provide relief to his symptoms. While in Denver, Sloan worked as a reporter for the Rocky Mountain News. He also worked at several mines near Breckenridge and Leadville, Colorado.

From Colorado, Sloan returned to Ohio and earned a Bachelor of Laws from the Cincinnati Law School (now the University of Cincinnati College of Law) in 1882. After graduation he and a friend, Louis H. Chalmers, traveled west, filling in for newspaper editors who wished to take time off from their duties. During the course of their journey they stopped in Saint Paul, Minnesota, Spokane, Washington Territory, Portland, Oregon, and San Francisco, California.

== Arizona Territory ==
While in San Francisco, Sloan suffered a bout of hay fever and asthma, and it was recommended to him that he should try the Arizona climate. Sloan and Chalmers arrived in Phoenix, Arizona, Arizona Territory in late 1884, and Sloan found the climate relieved his respiratory problems. Sloan was admitted to the territorial bar in January 1885 and opened a private legal practice with Chalmers as his partner. The firm of Sloan & Chalmers lasted until early 1886, when Sloan moved to Florence, Arizona Territory.

Sloan was elected to a term as County Attorney for Pinal County, Arizona Territory, running from 1887 to 1889. In 1888 he served as temporary chairman for the territorial Republican convention and was elected to represent Pinal County as a council member in the 15th Arizona Territorial Legislature. Sloan married Mary Brown of Hamilton, Ohio on November 22, 1887. The marriage produced three children: Richard E., who died in childhood, Elanor B. and Mary.

In May 1889, Sloan applied to United States Attorney General William H. H. Miller for a position as a judge. He was given a recess appointment to Arizona Territory's 1st district by President Benjamin Harrison in October 1889. He took his oath of office on November 2, 1889. The appointment was confirmed by the United States Senate on February 19, 1890. Upon his appointment Sloan moved to Tucson, Arizona Territory, the primary court location for his district.

Shortly after taking the bench Sloan drew the anger of Governor Lewis Wolfley when the new judge appointed a personal enemy of the governor, Brewster Cameron, as his court clerk. The governor complained that Sloan was ineligible to become a judge under federal law as he was a member of the territorial legislature. This complaint was technically correct as Sloan's term in the legislature did not officially end until December 31, 1890. The governor's ire was further provoked when Sloan dismissed his appeal of Wolfley v. Gila River Irrigation Company (1890), 3 Arizona 176 by pointing out that the appeal failed to claim any legal errors in the trial record.

Other notable decisions by Sloan while he was in Tucson were in Cheyney v. Smith (1890), 3 Arizona 143 when he determined that holidays, Sundays, and other days when the territorial legislature was in temporary recess did not count against a session's 60 day limit and Territory of Arizona v. Delinquent Tax-List of the County of Gila (1890), 3 Arizona 179 which determined a mortgage against a property did not reduce that property's assessed tax value. An 1892 ruling that the territory's government could not be held liable for bonds issued for the benefit of a company was upheld by the United States Supreme Court in Lewis v. Pima County (1894), 155 U.S. 54. His preeminent case came when he presided over the trial for the Wham Paymaster Robbery.

Sloan remained on the bench till 1894, with bipartisan support of the judge convincing President Grover Cleveland to allow him to complete his four-year term instead of replacing him at an earlier date. He administered the oath of office to his successor, Joseph D. Bethune, on June 1, 1894.

== Prescott ==
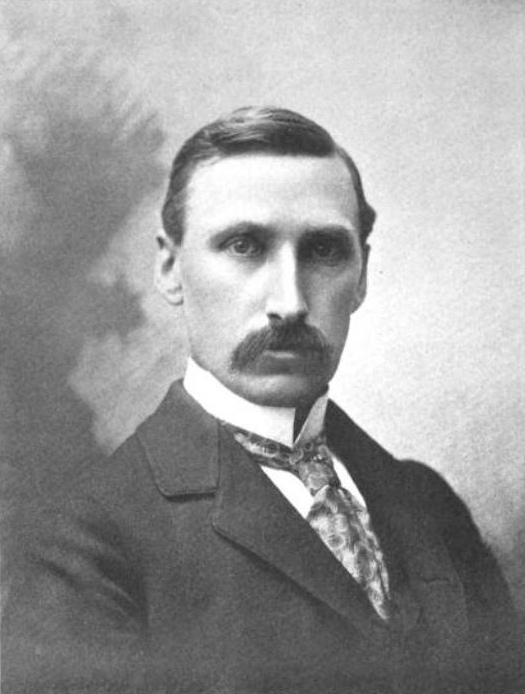
Judge Richard E. Sloan, c. 1901

After leaving the bench, Sloan also left Tucson, later noting that "Had the business outlook been more encouraging I should have remained." He relocated to Prescott, Arizona Territory and returned to private practice. On June 26, 1897, recently inaugurated President William McKinley nominated him for the seat in Arizona's 4th judicial district. Sloan was confirmed by the United States Senate on July 8, 1897. He took his oath of office on July 19, 1897. His four-year term was twice renewed by President Theodore Roosevelt, on December 12, 1901, and February 26, 1906.

While serving on the bench, Sloan issued legal opinions on a wide variety of issues. In Slosser v. Salt River Canal Company (1901), 7 Arizona 376 and Gould v. Maricopa Canal Company (1904), 8 Arizona 429 he established important precedents in water rights. Holderman v. Arizona (1900), 7 Arizona 120 in turn upheld a murder conviction against two brothers with Sloan's opinion determining that if a judge used a jury during a trial the jury's decision was only advisory. The cases of Steinfeld v. Zeckendorf (1906), 10 Arizona 221, Kinsley v. New Vulture Mining Company (1907), 11 Arizona 66, and Steinfeld v. Zeckendorf (1909), 12 Arizona 245 all involved disputes over mine ownership while United States v. Griswald (1904), 8 Arizona 453 dealt with the postmaster of Nogales losing a registered package containing US$2,000 and McPherson v. Hattich (1906), 10 Arizona 104 involved a contract dispute between a property owner and an architect.

A recurring theme in a number of cases was getting attorneys to specify errors when they filed appeals was a recurring problem. In Daggs v. Phoenix National Bank (1898), 5 Arizona 409 the judge wrote:

At the outset we are compelled to call attention to the omission of counsel to comply with the statue and rules of this court on the subject of assignment of error. These are imperative, and must be observed. It is not our business to search the record if perchance we may find reversible error. It is our duty to examine into such alleged errors, and only such, as are distinctly pointed out in the record.

Financial cases were also among Sloan's opinions with Gage v. McCord (1898), 5 Arizona 227 and Bravin v. Mayor of Tombstone (1899), 6 Arizona 212 dealing with the validity of territorial debts. Utter v. Franklin (1901), 7 Arizona 300 confirmed the validity of some railroad bonds issued in 1883. County of Cochise v. Copper Queen Consolidated Mining Company (1903), 8 Arizona 221, County of Cochise v. Copper Queen Consolidated Mining Company (1904), 8 Arizona 459, Board of Supervisors of Yavapai County v. Territory of Arizona (1906), 9 Arizona 405, and United Globe Mines v. Gila County (1909), 12 Arizona 217 all dealt with property taxes.

In addition to his other duties, Sloan was appointed in December 1900 by Governor Oakes Murphy to a commission chartered to revise the territorial legal code. The recommendations of the commission were enacted into law, with only minor changes, by the 21st Arizona Territorial Legislature. As delegate to the 1908 Republican National Convention, Sloan helped raise the issue of Arizona statehood.

== Governorship ==
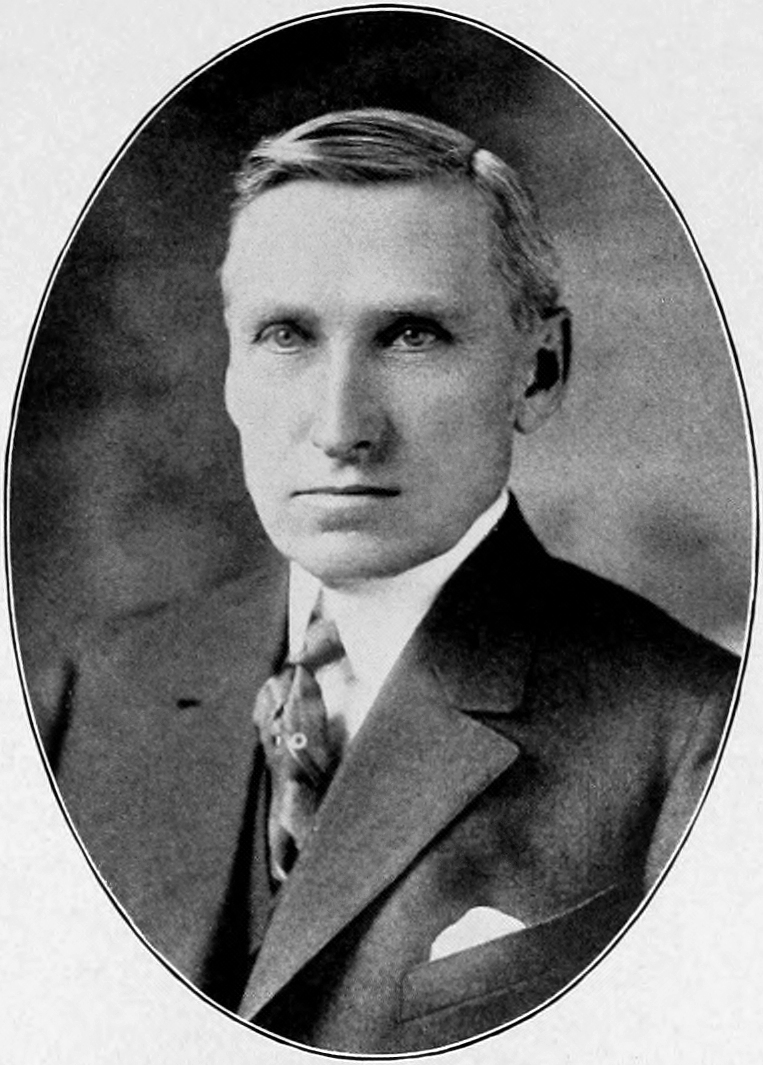
Governor Richard E. Sloan

Shortly after the inauguration of President William Howard Taft, Sloan was summoned to the White House. Governor Joseph Henry Kibbey, suspecting the reason for the summons, urged the judge to accept the governorship if it was offered to him. Sloan was reluctant to take the position, partially because of the low salary, but was convinced to accept. He took a short time to set his judicial affairs in order and was sworn in as governor in Phoenix on May 1, 1909.

At the time of Sloan becoming governor, common opinion was that Arizona would soon achieve statehood. The new governor echoed this view in his inaugural address by expressing his optimism for the quick passage of an enabling act for Arizona. Towards this end, Sloan joined with other territorial leaders to lobby for statehood. In October 1909, Sloan escorted President Taft on a tour of the territory that visited the Grand Canyon, Yuma, Phoenix, and Prescott before going to El Paso, Texas, to meet Mexican President Porfirio Díaz. Territorial Delegate Ralph H. Cameron introduced a statehood bill into the United States House of Representatives in January 1910 and Sloan spent the spring of that year in Washington, D.C., working toward passage of the bill. In June, Sloan was in Frankfort, Kentucky, helping to organize a National Governors Association convention.

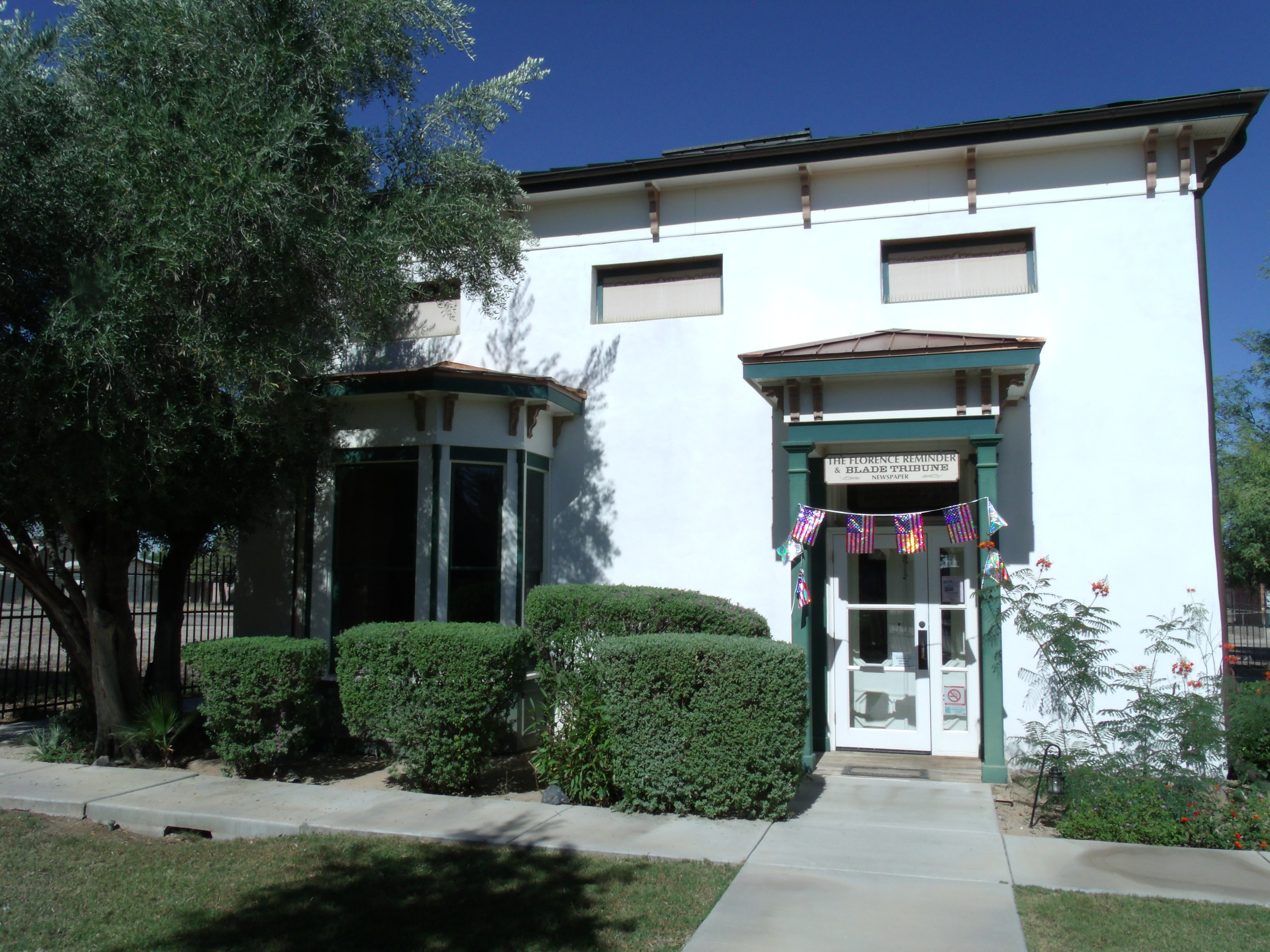
Governor Sloans residence in Florence, Arizona is located in 190 Main Street.

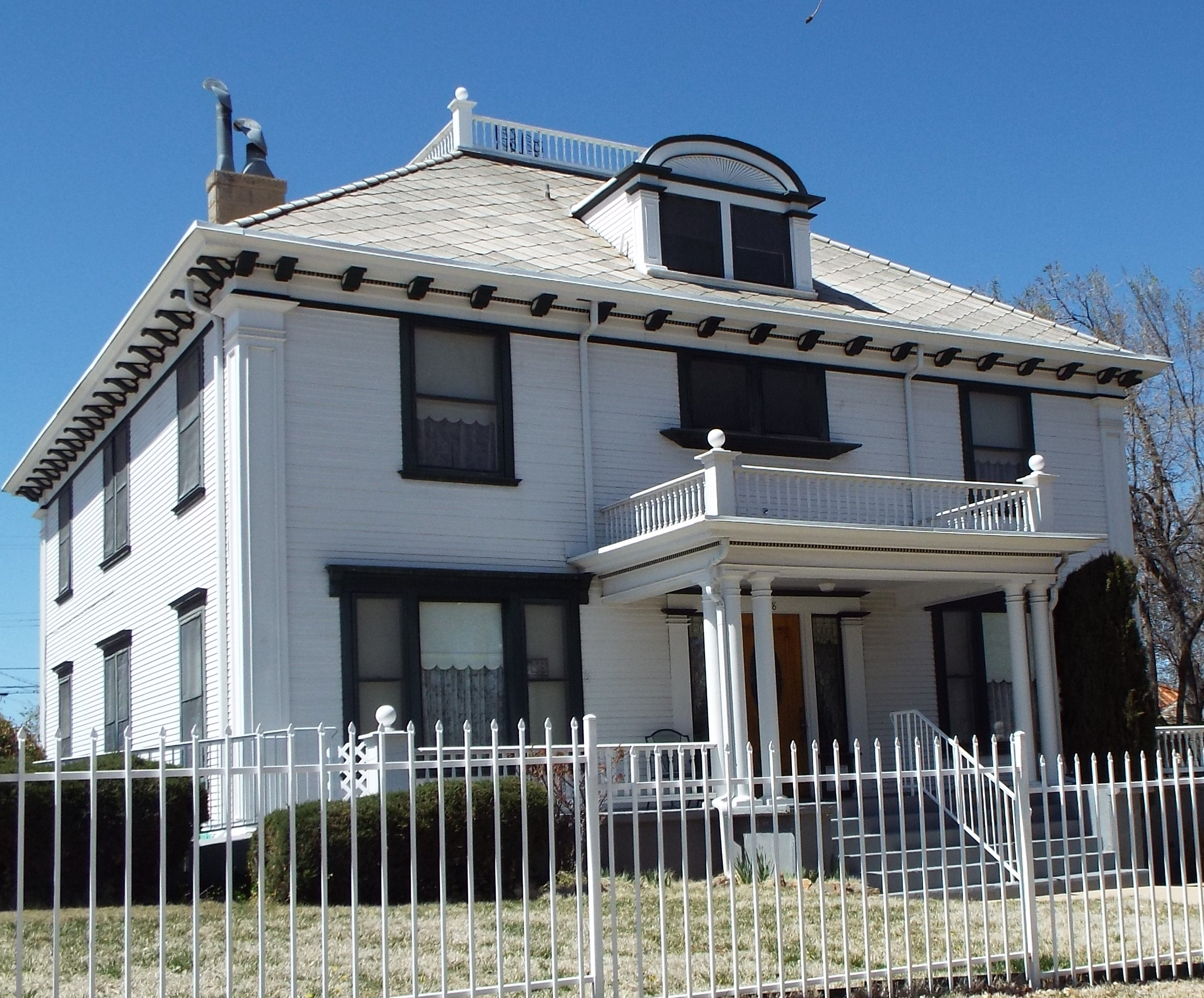
Governor Sloans residence in Prescott, Arizona is located in 128 North Mount Vernon Street.

President Taft signed Arizona's enabling act into law on June 20, 1910. Sloan responded by issuing a proclamation calling for the election of 52 delegates to a constitutional convention on June 28, 1910. Another provision of the enabling act was that the 1908 elections would be the final elections authorized under territorial law. This had the effect of canceling the session of the territorial legislature scheduled for January 1911. It was assumed when the enabling act was passed that a state legislature would meet in 1911 to address issues previously handled by the territorial legislature. When final approval of Arizona's statehood was delayed, emergency provisions in the enabling act came into play granting Sloan the authority to authorize needed appropriations and levy taxes. As Sloan later expressed, "Congress conferred upon me a greater authority in the matter of taxation than was ever exercised by any other executive in the history of the country."

Arizona's constitutional convention ran from October 10 to December 9, 1910. Sloan was unhappy with the document produced by the convention, stating "that the Constitution which is being formed will never be adopted". Sloan's primary contention was that the state's executive branch should be more centralized, with only the attorney general and state auditor elected separately from the governor. He also advocated a term limit of four or six years for the office of governor. Despite these concerns, Sloan did not advocate delaying statehood, stating "Personally, while there are things in the Constitution which I deem unwise still I would, as a citizen be willing to accept them if this would bring statehood – hoping that whatever should prove by experience to be unwise would be corrected in the future by amendment."

Final approval of the state constitution was delayed in Congress and by President Taft over the issue of recall of judges. After this provision was removed from the document, approval came on August 22, 1911. Following this approval, Sloan called for a December 12, 1911, special election to choose state and congressional office holders. The Territorial Governor's final day in office came on February 14, 1912, when President Taft signed the resolution admitting Arizona to the Union and Sloan attended the swearing-in ceremony for Governor George W. P. Hunt.

== Federal judicial service ==
On March 1, 1912, President Taft, who also graduated from the University of Cincinnati Law School, two years prior to the time of Sloan's graduation, nominated Sloan to be a judge for the United States District Court for the District of Arizona. Confirmation of the nomination was delayed by Arizona's two United States Senators who hoped instead for a Democratic nominee. Following the adjournment sine die of the Senate on August 26, 1912, Taft made a recess appointment on August 26, 1912, and Sloan took the bench on September 5, 1912. President Taft renominated Sloan on December 3, 1912, but the Senate never voted on the nomination. The recess appointment expired on March 3, 1913.

== Later service ==
After leaving the bench, Sloan spent the rest of his life in private legal practice in Phoenix. On August 15, 1921, he became a widower when his wife, Mary, died. At the request of Governor Thomas Edward Campbell, he represented Arizona at the November 1922 conference which created the Colorado River Compact. Sloan was the supervising editor of a four-part History of Arizona in 1930. This was followed by his autobiography, Memories of an Arizona Judge.

== Death ==
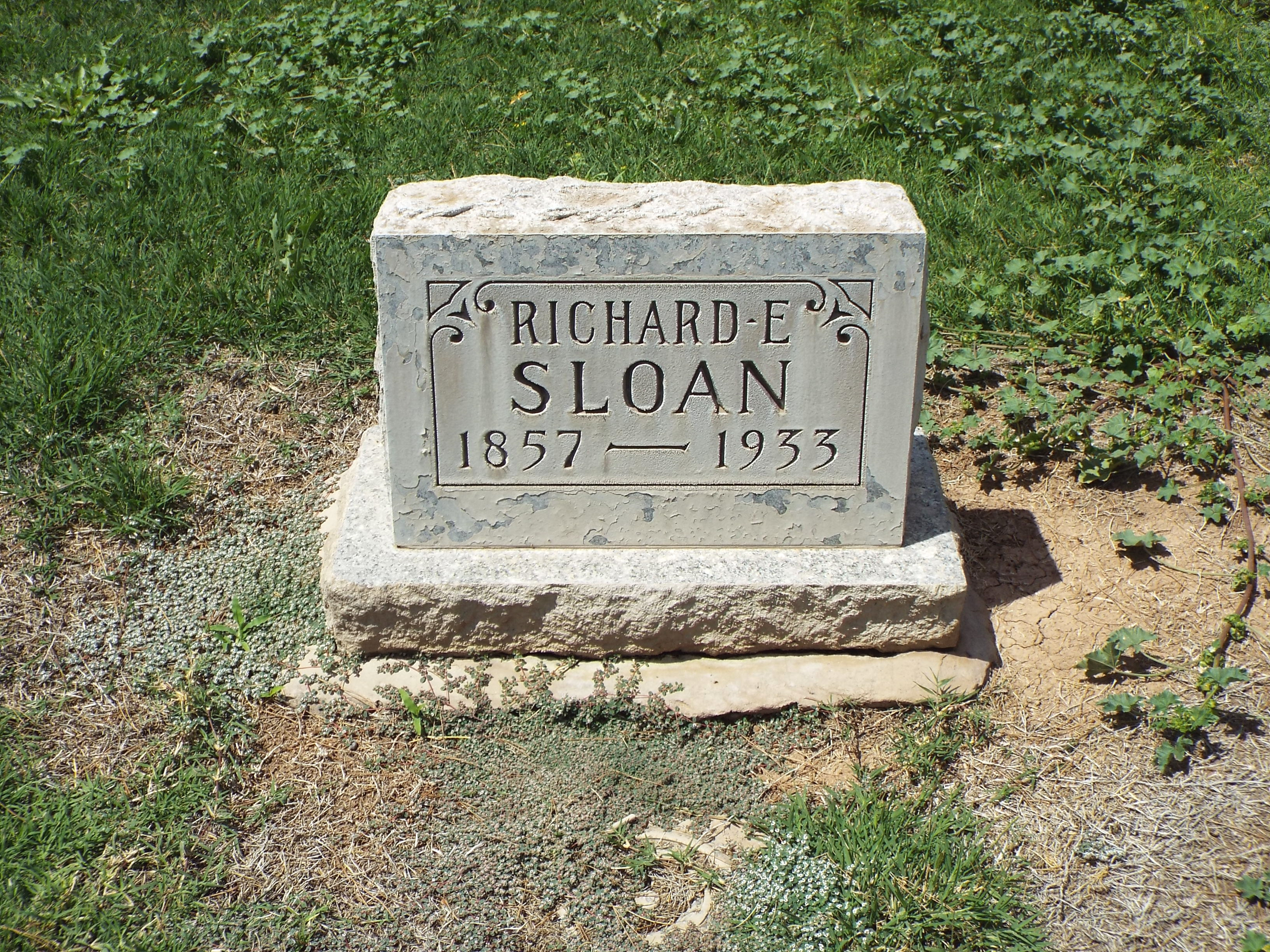
Gravesite of Richard Elihu Sloan

Sloan died in his home in Phoenix on December 14, 1933, the result of a basal skull fracture he had suffered after a fall three days earlier. He was buried in Phoenix's Greenwood Memorial Park (now Greenwood/Memory Lawn Mortuary & Cemetery).

== Sources ==
- "Sloan, Richard Elihu – Federal Judicial Center". www.fjc.gov.
- Farlow, Archa Malcolm (1912–1913). "Arizona's Admission to Statehood". Annual Publication of the Historical Society of Southern California. 9 (1/2). University of California Press: 132–153. doi:10.2307/41168902. JSTOR 41168902.
- Goff, John S. (July 1968). "The Appointment, Tenure and Removal of Territorial Judges: Arizona – A Case Study". The American Journal of Legal History. 12 (3). Temple University: 211–231. doi:10.2307/844126. JSTOR 844126.
- —— (1975). Arizona Territorial Officials Volume I: The Supreme Court Justices 1863–1912. Cave Creek, Arizona: Black Mountain Press. OCLC 1622668.
- —— (1978). Arizona Territorial Officials Volume II: The Governors 1863–1912. Cave Creek, Arizona: Black Mountain Press. OCLC 5100411.
- McClintock, James H. (1916). Arizona: Prehistoric—Aboriginal—Pioneer—Modern. Vol. II. Chicago: S.J. Clarke Publishing Company. OCLC 5398889.
- McMullin, Thomas A.; Walker, David (1984). Biographical Directory of American Territorial Governors. Westport, CT: Meckler Publishing. ISBN 0-930466-11-X.
- Wagoner, Jay J. (1970). Arizona Territory 1863–1912: A Political history. Tucson: University of Arizona Press. ISBN 0-8165-0176-9.

Legal offices
Preceded by Seat established by 36 Stat. 557	Judge of the United States District Court for the District of Arizona; 1912–1913	Succeeded by William Henry Sawtelle
