= Bench (law) =

Legal term with several meanings

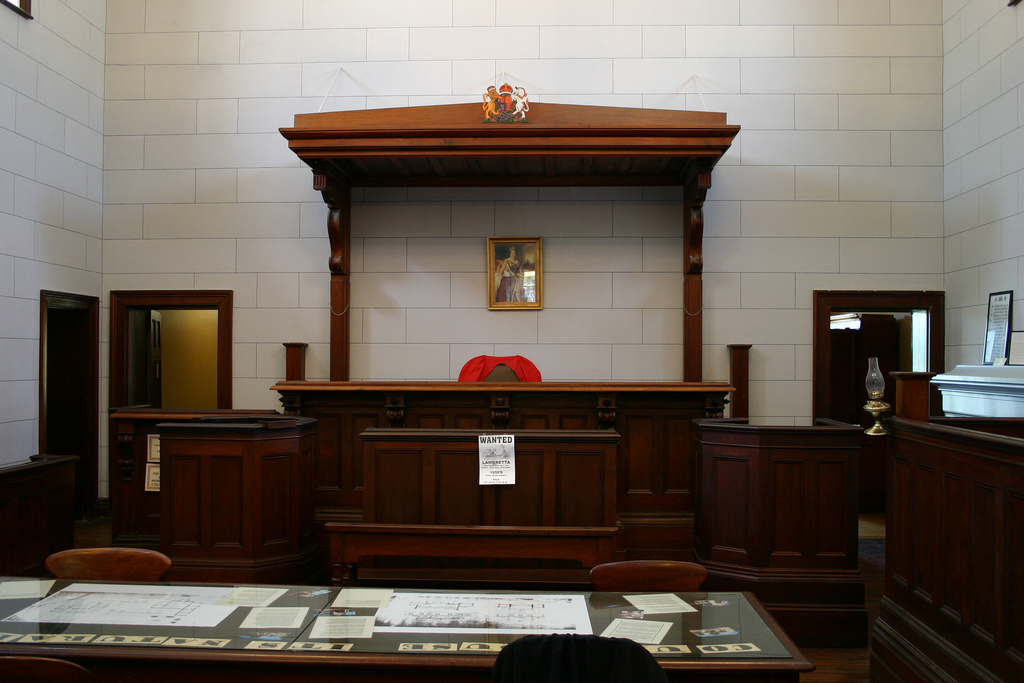
A judge's bench in a courtroom in Beechworth, Victoria, Australia. The term "bench" is also used as a metonym to mean all the judges of a certain court or members of a judiciary.

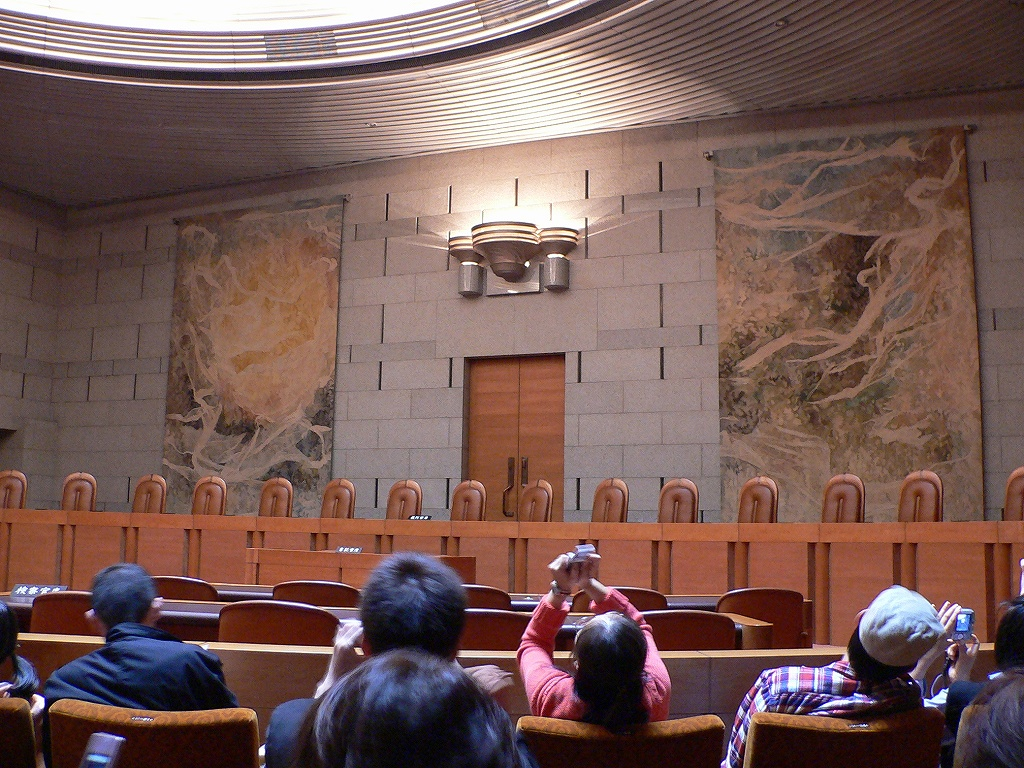
The Supreme Court of Japan Grand Bench seats 15 justices.

Bench used in a legal context can have several meanings. First, it can simply indicate the location in a courtroom where a judge sits. Second, the term bench is a metonym used to describe members of the judiciary collectively, or the judges of a particular court, such as the King's Bench or the Common Bench in England and Wales, or the federal bench in the United States. Third, the term is used to differentiate judges, who are referred to as "the bench", from attorneys or barristers, who are referred to as "the bar". The phrase "bench and bar" denotes all judges and lawyers collectively. The term "full bench" is used when all the judges of a certain court sit together to hear a case, as in the phrase "before the full bench", which is also referred to as en banc.

The historical roots of the term come from judges formerly having sat on long seats or benches (freestanding or against a wall) when presiding over a court. The bench is usually an elevated desk area that allows a judge to view, and to be seen by, the entire courtroom. The bench was a typical feature of the courts of the Order of St. John in Malta, such as at the Castellania, where judges and the nominated College of Advocates sat for court cases and review laws.

== See also ==
- Bank
- Bar (law)
- Bench trial
- Bencher
- En banc
- Full court
