= Dorothy Johnson =

Dorothy Johnson may refer to:

- Dorothy Johnson (actress) (1936–2022), American model and actress
- Dorothy M. Johnson (1905–1984), American author of Western fiction
- Dorothy Vena Johnson (1898–1970), American poet and educator
- Dorothy E. Johnson (1919–1999), American nursing theorist

== See also ==
- Dorothy Johnston (born 1948), Australian author of crime and literary fiction
- Dorothy Johnstone (1892–1980), Scottish artist
