= Mount Saint Mary's University (Los Angeles) =

Catholic women's university in Los Angeles, California

- Seal of Mount Saint Mary's University
- Motto: Deus Illuminatio Mea (Latin)
- Motto in English: God, My Light
- Type: Private university
- Established: 1925
- Affiliations: ACCU; NAICU; CIC
- Religious affiliation: Sisters of St. Joseph of Carondelet (Roman Catholic)
- Endowment: $165.2 million (2024)
- President: Ann McElaney-Johnson
- Provost: Adam Weyhaupt
- Faculty: 127 full-time, 312 part-time
- Administrative staff: 289 (2024)
- Students: 2,030 full-time, 278 part-time (2025)
- Undergraduates: 1,767 (2025)
- Postgraduates: 541 (2025)
- Location: Los Angeles, California, United States
- Campus: two urban campuses Chalon (Brentwood): 34.08512°N 118.48216°W 56 acres (23 ha) Doheny (Downtown): 34.02978°N 118.27771°W 20 acres (8.1 ha)
- Colors: Purple and gold
- Nickname: Athenians
- Mascot: Athena
- Website: www.msmu.edu

Mount Saint Mary's University is a private Catholic university primarily for women and located in Los Angeles, California. Colloquially referred to as "The Mount" by the community, it was founded in 1925 by the Sisters of St. Joseph of Carondelet.

The university served as a women's-only institution until 1960, when it introduced a selection of co-educational graduate programs. Men are now welcomed into all graduate programs, as well as the weekend/evening & online college. All nursing programs are also co-educational. As of 2025, women still make up 88 percent of the undergraduate student body.

Today, the university has two campuses 16 miles (26 km) apart: Chalon in Brentwood and Doheny in the West Adams district, near downtown Los Angeles. There is also a multimedia arts studio in Hollywood, for use by the Film, Media, and Communications Department. It was known as Mount St. Mary's College before January 2015.

The university offers 40+ undergraduate majors and minors, 15+ graduate programs, and 10+ Weekend/Evening & Online College programs. A total of 10 different degree types are available, as well as 10 professional development certificates and 8 teaching credentials.

== Campuses ==
=== Chalon Campus ===
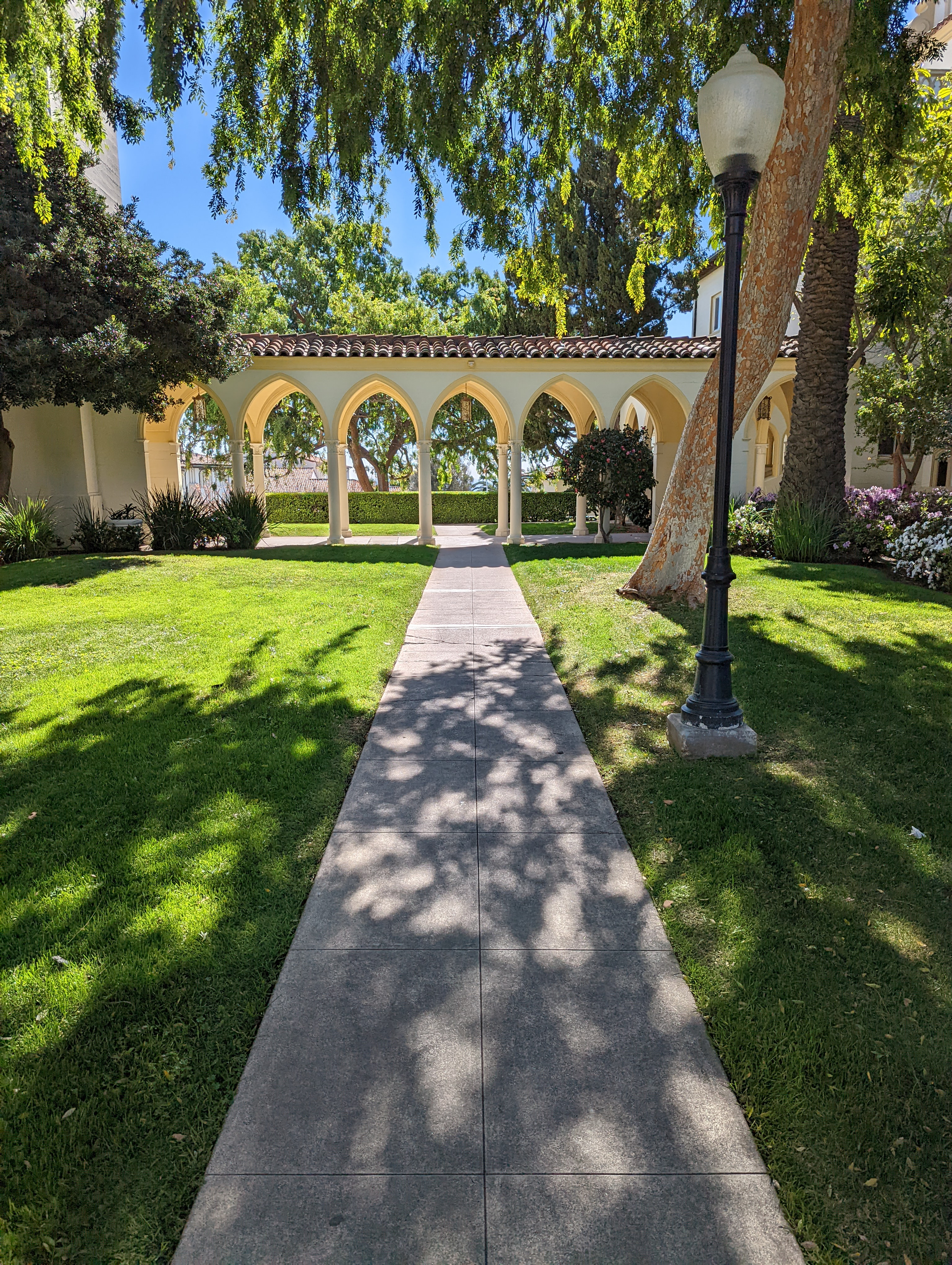
The Chalon Campus of MSMU Los Angeles

The university first held its classes at St. Mary's Academy, then located at West Slauson Avenue and Crenshaw Boulevard. In 1928, the Sisters purchased 36 acres (15 ha) of land along the foothills of the Santa Monica Mountains from the Rodeo Land and Water Company for $162,000. In 1947, an additional 20 acres (8.1 ha) was acquired to complete what is today the university's Chalon campus. The campus contains a blend of architecture familiar to Los Angeles, largely in the tradition of the Spanish Colonial Revival and Mission Revival styles. The location of the campus in Brentwood, on a 1,100-foot (340 m) ridge, provides an overlook to both the Getty Center and 40 miles (64 km) of the Pacific Ocean.

Being the university's first campus, Chalon has been home to a number of important events in the history of the university. In 1929, the university's first graduation was held on the Chalon campus. 20 years later, the university founded its historic Nursing program under the direction of Sr. Rebecca Doan, CSJ. After receiving full accreditation from the California Board of Nursing Examiners for its Bachelor of Science in Nursing degree, Mount Saint Mary's produced California's first BSN graduates in 1952. In 1955, the university also began offering graduate degree programs.

Today, the Chalon campus is home to the university's traditional undergraduate students, though some classes and student housing are also offered at the Doheny campus.

=== Doheny campus ===
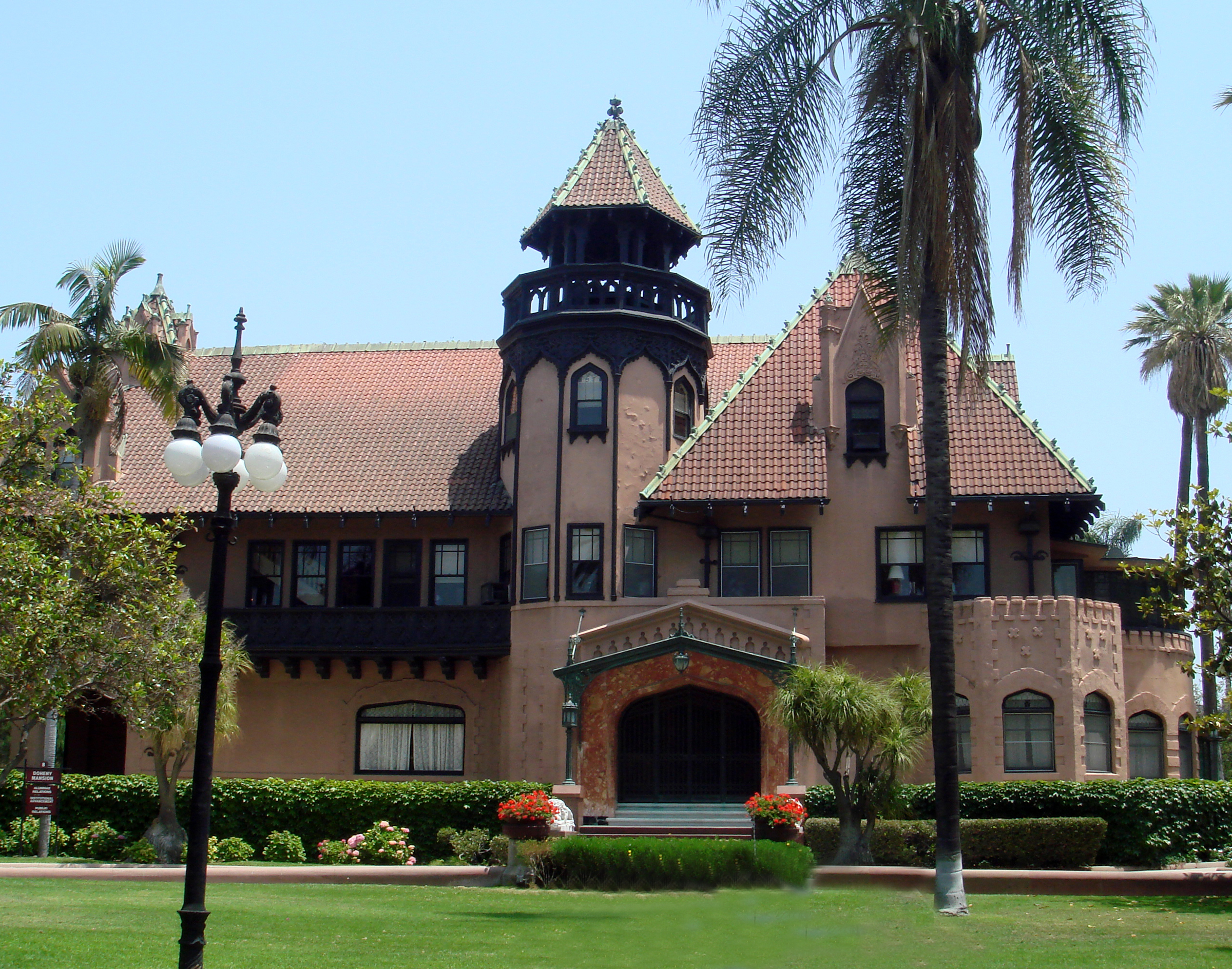
The Doheny Mansion, the center of the university's Downtown campus

The university grew to two campuses in 1962 when it was given 20 acres (8.1 ha), holding two city blocks of Queen Anne style and Victorian mansions, in the West Adams District The property was formerly owned by Edward L. Doheny and his wife, the Countess Carrie Estelle (née Betzold) Doheny (1875-1958), who made their fortune in oil. The Chester Place residences were built at the turn of the century by Judge Charles Silent. The Dohenys purchased the mansion at #8 Chester Place in 1901. Due to his wife's desire for more privacy, Edward L. Doheny went on to purchase all thirteen remaining lots on Chester Place in order to make it into a secure, gate- guarded street. The university named the campus after the Countess Doheny and her husband.

The Doheny campus first played host to the university's Associate in Arts program when it opened in 1962. Forty years later, in 2002, the university began its first doctoral degree, in physical therapy, which joined the other graduate programs offered at the Doheny campus. The first class of DPT students graduated in 2005.

In 1992, the university launched its Weekend and Evening College program at the Chalon campus, which primarily focuses on providing working professionals the opportunity to complete their undergraduate degrees within four years by attending classes scheduled on weekends. The Weekend and Evening College program moved to the Doheny campus in 2006, joining a number of courses for the associate and graduate programs offered at Doheny on weekday evenings and on weekends, furthering the idea of accessibility introduced by Weekend and Evening College.

Doheny is home to the university's associate, daytime and evening graduate programs, Weekend and Evening College (undergraduate and graduate), and educational credential programs.

=== Hollywood Studio ===
In 2022, the Mount opened a third academic location named the Hollywood Studio. Though not officially a campus, it serves as home to the university's Film, Media, and Communication department and is used to conduct tech-heavy multimedia courses. The Hollywood Studio also contains a podcast studio, computer lab, sound editing bay, full recording studio with isolation booth, and a 1,200 square foot shooting stage.

The Geena Davis Institute on Gender in Media is historically affiliated with the university. The current relationship is not clear, as the Institute's website contains no references to the university.

== Demographics ==
Student Demographics (2025)
Total number of students	2,316
First-generation college students	67%
Average undergraduate class size	15.9
Undergraduate student : faculty ratio	8 : 1
Gender:
Female students	88%
Male students	12%
Race:
Black	5%
Asian/Pacific Islander	13%
White	9%
Hispanic	46%
Other/Multiracial	12%

== Notable people ==
=== Alumni ===
- Barbara S. Jones, United States district judge of the United States District Court for the Southern District of New York
- Kathleen Martinez, immigration lawyer and social media personality
- Sonia Nazario (Honorary, 2010), journalist known for her work at Los Angeles Times
- Callista Roy, American nun, nursing theorist, professor, and author. Known for creating the adaptation model of nursing.

=== Faculty ===
- María Pilar Aquino, former professor of theology
- Gary James Jason, former instructor

== In the media ==
Because of its isolated location and scenic vistas and architecture, a number of movies and television shows have filmed on both campuses of the university. Some of the most notable past media projects filmed at the Mount include:

- Princess Diaries
- Spiderman 3
- The OC
- Catch Me if You Can
- The Notebook
- Ratched
- House
- Gilmore Girls
- Mad Men
- Modern Family
- The Mentalist
- The Good Place.
