= Justice Sheldon =

Justice Sheldon may refer to:

- A. W. Sheldon (c. 1842–1884), associate justice of the Arizona Territorial Supreme Court
- Benjamin R. Sheldon (1811 – April 13, 1897), associate justice of the Illinois Supreme Court
- Henry Newton Sheldon (1842–1926), associate justice of the Massachusetts Supreme Judicial Court
