= Callista Roy =

American nun, nursing theorist, professor and author (born 1939)

- Born: Callista Lorraine Roy; October 14, 1939 (age 85)
- Education: MSMU; UCLA
- Years active: 1963–present
- Known for: Adaptation model of nursing
- Medical career
- Profession: Nursing professor
- Institutions: Boston College
- Research: Nursing theory

Sister Callista Roy, CSJ (born October 14, 1939) is an American nun, nursing theorist, professor and author. She is known for creating the adaptation model of nursing. She was a nursing professor at Boston College before retiring in 2017. Roy was designated as a 2007 Living Legend by the American Academy of Nursing.

== Education ==
Roy graduated from Bishop Conaty-Our Lady of Loretto High School before earning an undergraduate degree in nursing from Mount St. Mary's College in 1963, followed by a master's degree in nursing from University of California, Los Angeles (UCLA) in 1966. She then earned master's and doctoral degrees in sociology from UCLA. She served as a postdoctoral fellow in neuroscience nursing at the University of California, San Francisco. She has been awarded four honorary doctorates.

== Career ==
Roy was Professor and Nursing Theorist at Boston College's Connell School of Nursing. In 1991, she founded the Boston Based Adaptation Research in Nursing Society (BBARNS), which would later be renamed the Roy Adaptation Association. She has lectured across the United States and in more than thirty other countries. Late in her career, she studied the role of lay study partners in recovery from mild head injury. She retired from Boston College in 2017 and moved back to California.

She belonged to the Sisters of St. Joseph of Carondelet.

== Roy Adaptation Model ==
During her graduate studies, Roy was compelled by instructor Dorothy E. Johnson to write a conceptual model of nursing. The Roy Adaptation Model was first published in Nursing Outlook in 1970. In this model, humans (as individuals or in groups) are holistic, adaptive systems. The environment consists of internal and external stimuli that surround an individual or group. Health is seen as a sound, unimpaired condition leading to wholeness. Nursing's goal is to promote modes of adaptation that support overall health.

Four modes of adaptation support integrity: physiologic-physical, self-concept group identity, role function and interdependence. In applying Roy's model, the following steps may help to integrate it with the traditional nursing process: assessment of client behavior; assessment of stimuli; nursing diagnosis; goal setting; interventions; and evaluation.

== Honors and awards ==
- 2006: Distinguished Teaching Award, Boston College
- 2007: Living Legend, American Academy of Nursing
- 2010: Inductee, Sigma Theta Tau's Nurse Researcher Hall of Fame
- 2011: Mentor Award, Sigma Theta Tau Society

== Published works ==
- Proposed: Nursing is a theoretical body of knowledge that prescribes analysis and action to care for an ill person.
- Roy, Callista (1988). "Sister Callista Roy". In Schorr, Thelma M.; Zimmerman, Anne (eds.). Making Choices, Taking Chances: Nurse Leaders Tell Their Stories. St. Louis, Missouri: The C. V. Mosby Company. ISBN 0801646111.
- Roy, C. (2009). "Assessment and the Roy Adaptation Model", The Japanese Nursing Journal, 29(11), 5-7.
- Roy, C. (2008). "Adversity and theory: The broad picture", Nursing Science Quarterly, 21(2), 138-139.
- Whittemore, R. & Roy, C. (2002). "Adapting to Diabetes Mellitus: A Theory Synthesis", Nursing Science Quarterly, 15(4), 311-317.

== See also ==
- List of Living Legends of the American Academy of Nursing
