= Fruhling Bros. Artistic Wrought Iron Works =

19th-century company in California, U.S.

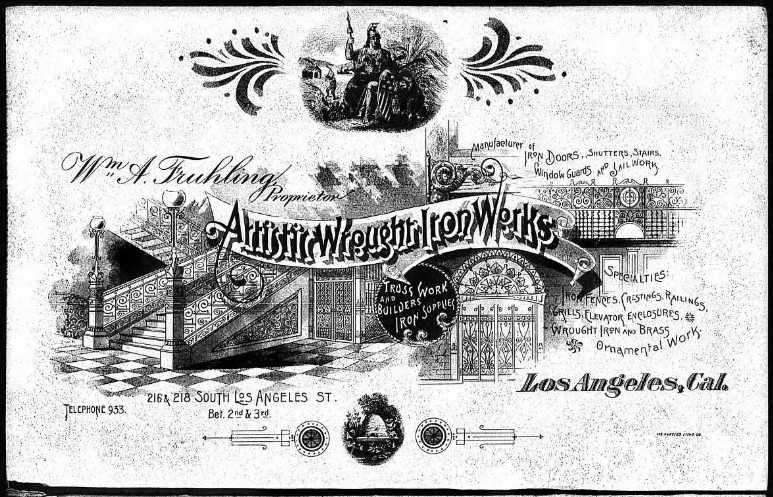
- Artistic Wrought Iron Works Advertisement - 1895 - U.S. City Directory Los Angeles
- Industry: Ornamental Iron Works
- Headquarters: 216 and 216 South Los Angeles Street, Los Angeles, California, United States
- Owners: William A. Fruhling Jr. and Albert G. Fruhling

Fruhling Bros. Artistic Wrought Iron Works was an ornamental iron works company located in Los Angeles, California in the late 19th century. Fruhling Bros. Artistic Wrought Iron Works was owned and operated by the brothers William A. Fruhling Jr. and Albert G. Fruhling. In 1891 the company was located at 216 and 218 South Los Angeles Street in Los Angeles. The company manufactured ornamental iron work for balconies, grills, stair rails, fire escapes, guard rails, gates, crestings, fencing, tower ornaments bearing the imprint of Fruhling Bros. that could be seen throughout Southern California. The company also manufactured iron doors, shutters, shutters, stairs, window guards, jail work, truss work, builders' iron supplies, elevator enclosures, along with ornamental brass work.

The company's ornamental iron work was a component of several notable buildings throughout Los Angeles and Southern California, including ornamental iron work on the mansion of Judge Charles Silent, all of the ornamental iron work on the Woman's Christian Temperance Union Building, the stair railing for the old Los Angeles City Hall, and the Abstract Title Building.
