= Beatriz Melano =

Argentine-born Uruguayan feminist theologian (1931–2004)

- Born: Beatriz Elena Melano Laguardia; October 20, 1931; Buenos Aires
- Died: May 29, 2004 (aged 72); Montevideo
- Occupations: theologian, educator
- Spouse: Richard Arden Couch
- Children: Ana Gabriela, Johanna Ruth, Marcos Couch
- Theological work
- Language: Spanish
- Tradition or movement: Liberation theology

Beatriz Melano (October 20, 1931 – May 29, 2004) was an Argentine-born Uruguayan Protestant theologian. Melano is the first known Protestant woman in Latin America to earn a doctorate in theology. Her participation in international theological conferences established a foundation for future women and Latin American theologians. Melano's books, articles, and presentations on a wide range of theological topics contributed to Latin American feminist and liberation theology. Her influence as a theologian extended beyond Latin America to the United States and Europe. In 1994, a meeting of "Women Professors of Theology" honored Melano as the first woman to be a professor of theology in Latin America.

== Life ==
Beatriz Elena Melano was born on October 20, 1931, in Buenos Aires, Argentina. Her mother, Maria Luisa Laguardia, was a dentist from Uruguay and her father, Giuseppe Melano, worked as a publicist for a tobacco company. As a child, Melano helped her mother in working and serving as members of a Baptist church in Buenos Aires. While a student at Princeton Theological Seminary, she met her husband, Richard Arden Couch (a Presbyterian minister). The couple married in 1957. Melano and Couch accepted teaching positions at Union Seminary in Buenos Aires in 1959. Melano had three children—two daughters, Ana Gabriela (deceased) and Johanna Ruth—and one son, Marcos José. The couple later divorced.

Beatriz Melano died on May 29, 2004, in Montevideo.

== Education ==
In 1950, Melano earned a teaching degree at the National Normal School in Lomas de Zamora, Uruguay. After this, she earned several degrees from institutions in Europe, North America, and Argentina. In 1955, she earned a degree in Modern Languages from Tift College in Georgia. Two years later, in 1957, she completed a degree at Princeton Theological Seminary having studied Christian Education and Theology. While studying at Union Seminary, in 1964, she completed a clinical pastoral practicum at Presbyterian Hospital in New York. In 1970, under the direction of Jorge Luis Borges, Melano completed thesis entitled "The Problematic of Salvation in O'Neill" for a degree in Modern Literature from the University of Buenos Aires. Finally, she completed a PhD in Strasbourg, France, under the direction of Roger Mehl. Her dissertation focused on Paul Ricouer's hermeneutics.

== Career ==
Educated an institutions in South America, North America, and Europe, Beatriz Melano's work was informed by a broad range of thinkers and theologians. In addition to Paul Ricoeur's hermeneutics, Melano was influenced by the liberation theology's development in Latin America. She credited Sor Juana Ines de la Cruz as the first woman to defend the right to think and practice theology. She cited Lucy Stone and Mary Wollstonecraft for their role as defenders of human and women's rights. She attributed Rosemary Radford Ruether, for her critique of soul-body dualism, Elizabeth Schussler Fiorenza's re-interpretation of patriarchal Christian traditions, and Letty Russell for the necessity of linguistic conventions that served as alternatives oppressive conventions.

Melano worked as a professor at the Higher Evangelical Institute of Theological Studies (Instituto Superior Evangelíco de Estudios Teológicos) (ISEDET) in Buenos Aires. While there, she founded and directed the institute's Department of Christian Education. In the 1960s she participated in efforts to raise the visibility of women in religion in Bolivia, Uruguay, and Mexico. She also worked to unite Catholic and Protestant women in support of feminist theology. Melano was a founding member of Church and Society in Latin America (ISAL), a group that worked ecumenically to address social inequities. In 1963, she was one of thirty-three women to attend the II Latin American Evangelical Conference (CELA) in Lima, Peru, 1961. On reflecting on CELA meetings in Lima, Melano observed that churches in Latin America needed to work for social change. In 1963, Melano participated in the Encounter of North American Presbyterian and Latin American Reformed Women. Her work to advance human rights and feminist, liberation theology is reflected in her memberships in the IV Commission of the World Council of Churches and the Permanent Assembly for Human Rights of Argentina. Melano wrote and spoke at conferences and meetings on a wide range of topics, including: biblical interpretation, Christian education, pastoral psychology, evangelization, ecumenism, the mission of the Church, systematic theology, liberation theology, ethics, feminist theology, Black theology, religious studies, and hermeneutics. In 1976, she was invited to Tanzania to speak at the Ecumenical Dialogue of Third World Theologians on the subject of "Liberation Theology and the Mission of the Church in Latin America"—she was the only woman from Argentina to attend the conference that broke the ground for the establishment of Ecumenical Association of Third World Theologians (EATWOT). That same year, Reverend Emilio Castro invited her to speak at a conference entitled "The Role of Women in Church and in Society" for the Unidad Evangelical Latinoamericana (UNELAM). In her presentation, entitled "Man and Woman in God's Mission," Melano asserted that theological process of becoming human could be understood as "becom[ing] the flesh the other." In other words, she believed that while identifying with the other-ed, humans are better able to have a critical consciousness and knowledge that would contributor to caring for all people. In 1979, Melano attended "The Initial Encounter Mexico," a meeting that aimed to gather women in religion from across Latin America to advocate for the inclusion of women's perspectives in liberation theology. Other key participants at the meeting, included: Elsa Támez, Ofelia Ortega, María Pilar Aquino, and Leonor Aída Concha. In the 1980s, Melano participated in the Center for the Study of Social laws in Buenos Aires, an ecumenical group that met regularly to support human rights.

Melano retired from ISEDET in 1998.

== Influence ==
Beatriz Melano contributed to the development of Liberation Theology in Latin America and contributed both feminist and Protestant perspectives. According to Marcella Althaus-Reid, Melano coined the term "pertinent theology" (a precursor of liberation theology). Melano envisioned a theology that was prophetic, ecumenical, and apposed to systemic violence. She aimed to practice "theology on the march," in other words, a theology that worked toward liberating the oppressed concrete terms. She proposed a new ways of talking about interpretation that would recover the "image of God" (as expressed in all humanity) from patriarchy. Her theological scholarship made the case for placing an understanding of social and cultural issues, including race and gender, at the forefront of scriptural interpretation. For example, in her work "Man and Woman in God's Mission," Melano interpreted the biblical concepts of "one flesh" and "the priesthood of all believers" as correctives to separate, gendered labor roles. Likewise, she argued that the Christian concept of salvation was exemplified in the liberation of oppressed people.

In her book, La mujer y la Iglesia (1973), Melano collected her lectures from the Second Iberian Ecumenical Encounter of Women in Madrid (1971). In these lectures, and elsewhere, she argued that the full inclusion of women would better enable the church to address social inequities. It was her hope that this argument would inspire women throughout Latin America. Even so, while Melano's work more influential in the United States and Europe, it was largely overlooked by theologians in Latin America.

In the 1994 "Profesoras de teología" (Women Professors of Theology) meeting, Melano was honored as the first woman professor of theology in Latin America and as a landmark scholar who opened the door for other Latin American women in her field. In the same year, the editor of the journal, Vida y pensamiento, remarked in the editorial preface that Melano's work led other women in Latin America to become educators.

Her work as an educator and scholar continues to influence others. In 2009, Mercedes L. García Bachmann, described Melano as "an amazon of the universe of Protestant theology in the second half of the 20th century."

== Selected works ==
- “El hombre y la mujer en la misión de Dios.” In El rol de la mujer en la Iglesia y sociedad, edited by Emilio Castro, 75–91. Montevideo: UNELAM, 1968.
- La mujer y la Iglesia. Buenos Aires: El Escudo, 1973.
- “La teología, el lenguaje masculino y el rol de la mujer, sus implicaciones en las comunicaciones.” In Mujer latinoamericana, Iglesia y teología, edited by Guadalupe Abdó, Olga Rivera, Victoria Reyes, et al. Mexico City: Mujeres para el Diálogo, 1979.
- Hermenéutica metódica: teoría de la interpretación según Paul Ricoeur. Buenos Aires: Docencia, 1983.
- “Hermenéutica feminista. El papel de la mujer y sus implicaciones.” Vida y Pensamiento 14, no. 1: 15–33, 1994.
