= A. W. Sheldon =

American jurist and military officer (1842–1884)

Associate Justice, Arizona Territorial Supreme Court
- In office May 15, 1883 – January 31, 1884
- Nominated by: Chester A. Arthur
- Preceded by: Wilson W. Hoover
- Succeeded by: William F. Fitzgerald

Personal details
- Born: 1842 or early 1843 Granville, Ohio
- Died: January 31, 1884 San Francisco, California
- Party: Republican
- Profession: Attorney

Alvanus Warner Sheldon (c. 1842 – January 31, 1884) was an American jurist who served as Associate Justice of the Arizona Territorial Supreme Court from 1883 until his death in 1884.

== Background ==
Sheldon was born in Granville, Ohio, to Paul Warner Sheldon Jr. and his second wife, Eliza (Howell) Sheldon, in either 1842 or early 1843. He was educated in local public schools and attended Denison University.

With the outbreak of the American Civil War, Sheldon enlisted as a private for three months in the 17th Ohio Infantry. After the completion of his initial enlistment, he joined the 45th Ohio Infantry. Sheldon was commissioned as a captain on October 13, 1864. Sheldon spent the remainder of the war as a staff officer for a number of commanding officers, "having been severely wounded in battle and incapacitated for active field service". At the end of hostilities he was assigned to Richmond, Virginia, as Commissary of Subsistence of Virginia. Sheldon achieved the brevet rank of lieutenant colonel on March 13, 1865, and left the military on March 20, 1866.

Following the war, Sheldon moved to New York City, where he studied law. On his application for the Arizona bench, he indicated that he had graduated from the "Columbia College Law School", though the Columbia University records do not list him as having received a degree. By 1875, Sheldon had been admitted to the bar and was practicing law at the firm of Lockwood, Sheldon & Lockwood. While in New York, Sheldon served as Judge Advocate for the New York State Militia, participated in veteran's organizations, and was an attorney for the Prison Association of New York.

By 1880, problems from his war wounds became bad enough that he sought relief by moving south in hope of a more beneficial climate. To assist him in these efforts, Sheldon's friends found him a job as editor of the Sunday Baltimore Herald. While in Baltimore, Sheldon was recommended by William Pinkney Whyte for judicial appointment. This recommendation was then endorsed by Ulysses S. Grant, Roscoe Conkling, and prominent members of the New York and Baltimore legal profession. In the recommendation, Sheldon's friends noted he had "lately been addicted" to the newspaper business and wished to leave it.

President Chester A. Arthur nominated Sheldon to replace Wilson W. Hoover as Associate Justice of the Arizona Territorial Supreme Court on March 30, 1883. At the time of the appointment, Sheldon's physicians were recommending he undergo surgery in New York before traveling to Arizona. Sheldon was concerned about the expected recovery time and instead chose to leave for the territory immediately, arriving to take his oath of office on May 15, 1883. Upon his arrival, he settled in Tucson, Arizona Territory and was assigned to Graham, Pima, and Pinal counties. In September 1883, Sheldon traveled to San Francisco, California and underwent a series of three operations to his hip and thigh.

On November 5, 1883, Sheldon presided over Graham County's first district court session. This was followed on January 7, 1884, by his joining with Chief Justice C. G. W. French and Justice Daniel H. Pinney for a session of the Arizona Territorial Supreme Court. While court records indicate that Sheldon "rendering decision" on several cases, the only surviving decision is a concurrence with Justice Pinney's decision in Dawson v. Lail, (1884) 1 Arizona 490.

Following the Supreme Court session, Sheldon traveled to San Francisco for additional medical treatment. While there, he died on January 31, 1884, in the Palace Hotel. He was provided a funeral by a local veterans' association.
