= Chester Place =

Gated community in Los Angeles, California

Coordinates: 34.030594°N 118.276985°W

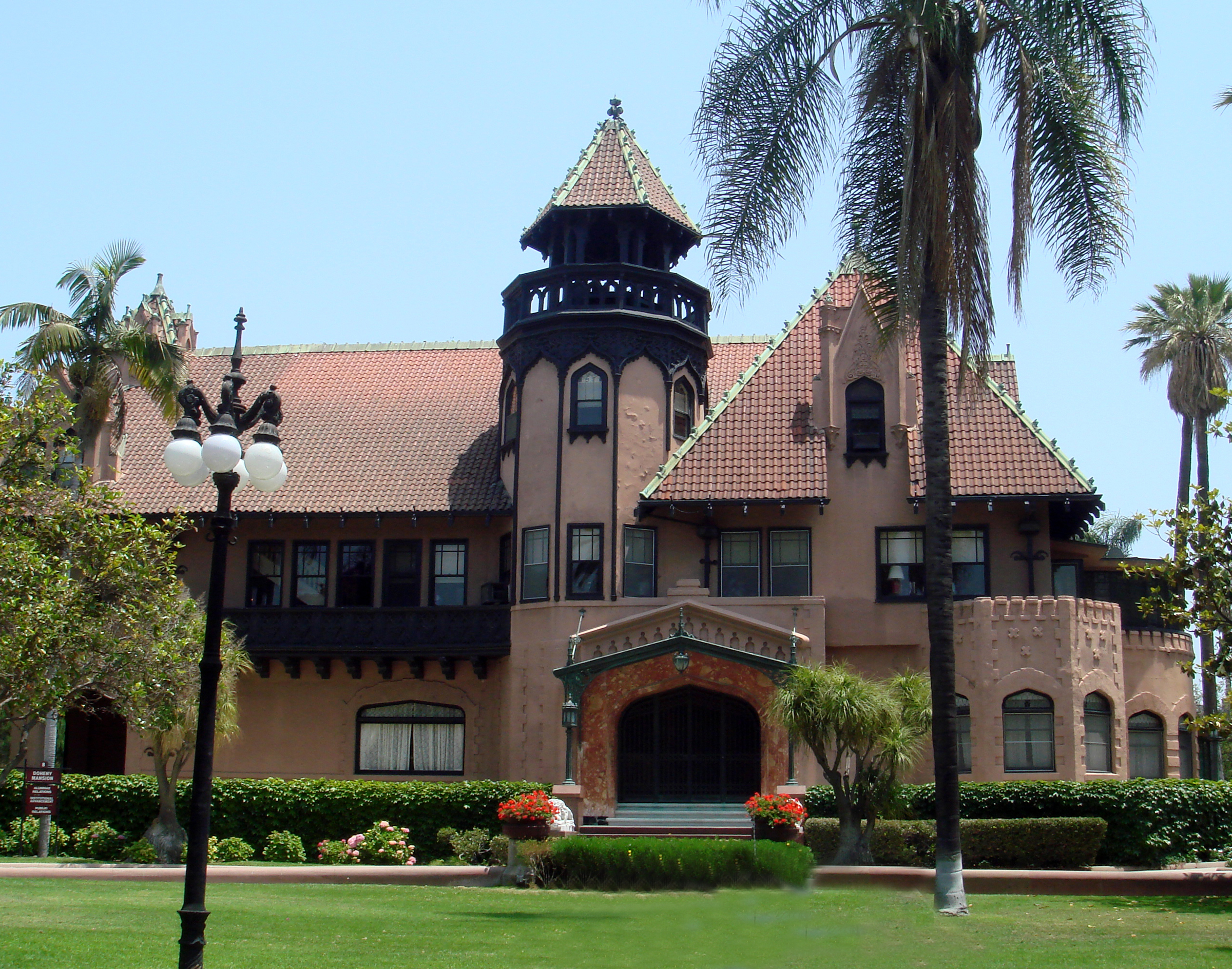
Number 8 Chester Place

Chester Place was one of the first gated communities in Los Angeles, California. It was notable for its close proximity to the University of Southern California, as well as prestigious residents such as Edward L. Doheny. The community later became a satellite campus of Mount St. Mary's College in 1962 after the land was left as a gift from Estelle Doheny.

== Early development ==
The foundation for the creation of Chester Place started with a Los Angeles land survey conducted in 1853 by New Hampshire lawyer Henry Hancock. Hancock surveyed the lots near present-day Downtown Los Angeles based on the dirt road boulevards that ran east to west across the city. Between each of these boulevards land was separated into large 35-acre (140,000 m^{2}) lots to be sold. In 1855 Hancock eventually bought one of the best lots, which was to later become Chester Place.

Hancock sold this lot that would become Chester place on July 26, 1867, to a group of buyers, one of whom was the New England sea captain Nathan Vail, who purchased 17 acres (69,000 m^{2}) right north of Adams Boulevard. Around this same time, the city brought irrigation canals to the area. This irrigation canal, or a zanja as the Mexican settlers called it, increased the land value of the area, which was directly related to the availability of water. South of Adams and Chester Place a new Agricultural park was also growing, which became known for horse racing, gambling, and entertainment. With a new streetcar line extended from historic Downtown in 1874 along Washington and Figueroa, this meant that the Agricultural Park area had easy transportation to the hub of the city. Agricultural Park would later be renamed Exposition Park when it was incorporated into city limits and was the site of the 1932 and 1984 Summer Olympics.

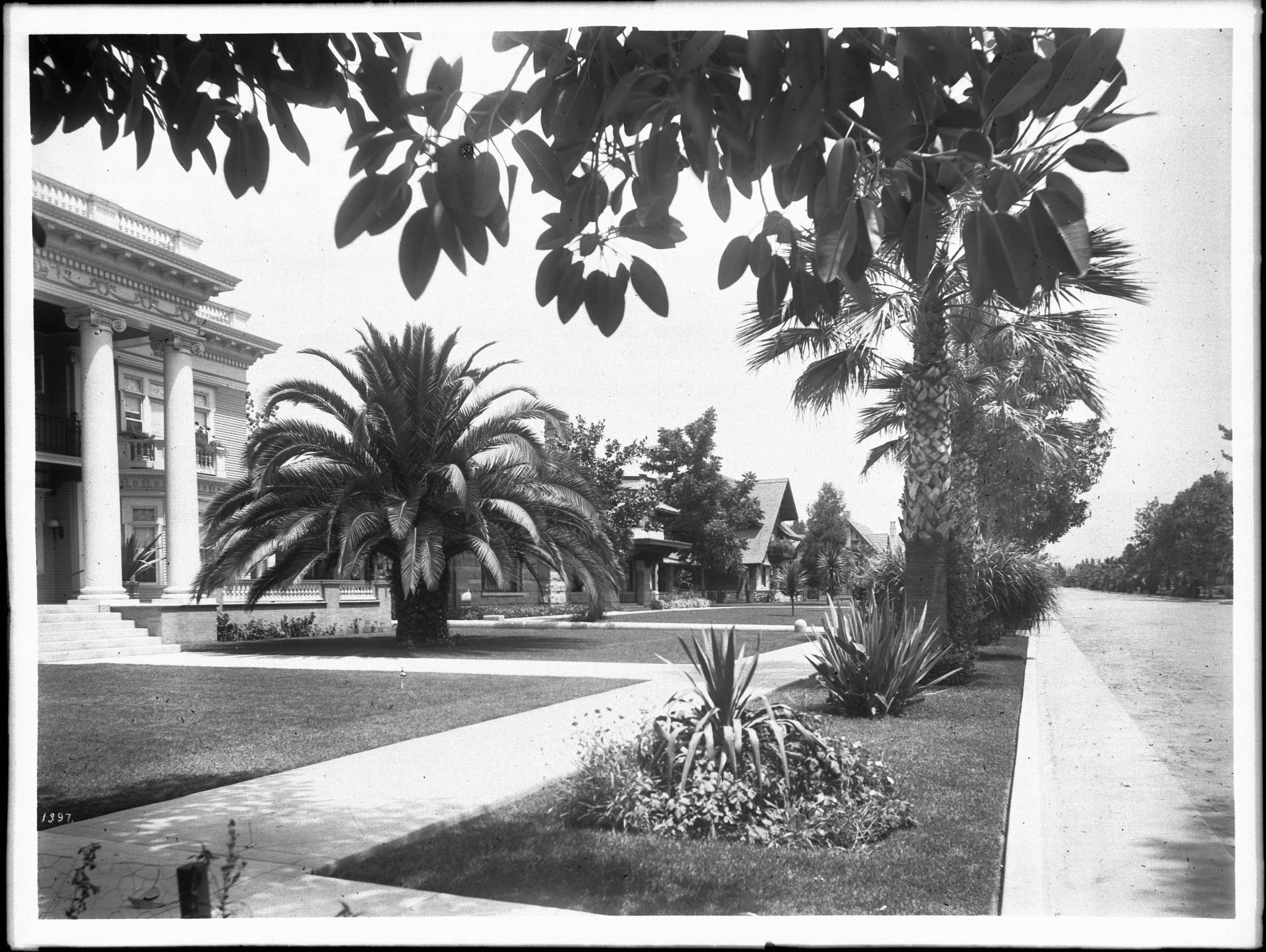
Palm trees and large homes on Chester Place, 1905

Nathan Vail had become involved in a number of real estate speculations during the early 1880s, and eventually sold his personal lot north of Adams to Arizona Federal Judge Charles Silent. In 1899 Silent moved his family to Vail's old home north of Adams, and extended a private street south to 23rd Street, and subdivided the land into 23 lots on either side of the road. This subdivision represents the official founding of Chester Place, which could be seen behind the massive stone and steel gates that Vail had built to surround his home. Vail established the subdivision on January 21, 1899, and named the street after his son Chester, who graduated from Stanford University in 1907. The property was originally called Los Pimentos named after the pepper trees that lined the driveway.

== The Doheny years ==
S.E. Posey, a socialite, purchased the first lot in Chester Place and erected a twenty-two-room mansion. Then on October 24, 1901, Edward and Estelle Doheny purchased number 8 Chester Place for $120,000 cash.

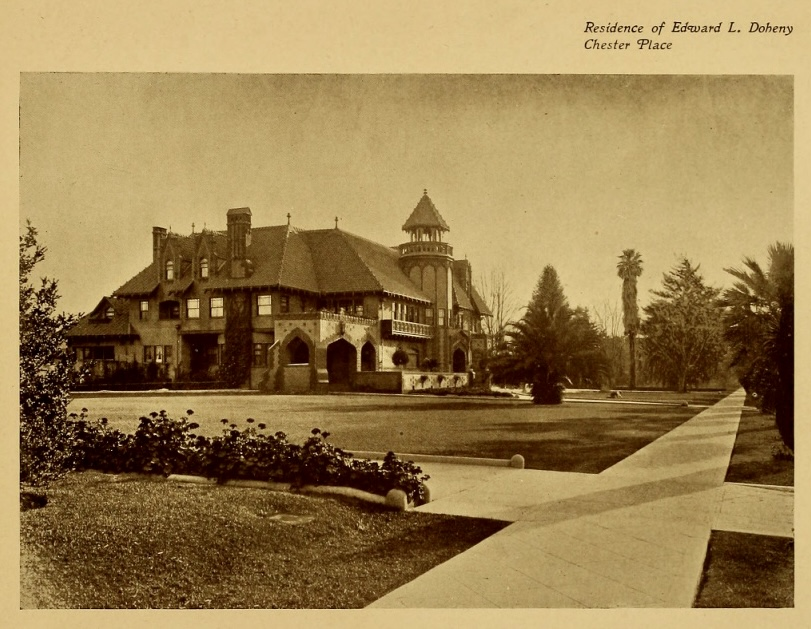
View of Edward L. Doheny home, circa 1904

The Dohenys immediately began renovations on their new home. The house encompassed 24,000 square feet (2,200 m^{2}) and was constantly worked on for the 58 years the family lived there. Almost immediately after moving in, Estelle was left on her own as Edward Doheny was in Mexico for much of the time working on developing his oil holdings in Mexico. Edward in turn left the renovations up to her which included hiring of staff, construction workers, and day-to-day maintenance. Edward relayed instructions via telegram about what he wanted done with the home. At the finish of the first stage of remodeling in 1902, it was featured in The House Beautiful, which caused a great number of tourists and visitors to show up on the lawn and even knock on the door requesting photographs. This lack of privacy prompted Edward to quietly buy up the remaining thirteen lots at Chester Place to ensure their privacy. Much of the renovations at Chester Place were important to Doheny since the home represented his financial wealth and stability, and as his increasingly unsure investments in Mexico were not yielding returns, it was important for investors that he keep up appearances at home.

Edward Doheny, Jr., commonly known as "Ned," was raised and married at Chester Place. In 1928, he moved to Greystone Mansion in Beverly Hills. Edward, Sr., died in 1935 at the age of 79. Estelle continued to live at Chester Place, although they also constructed a ranch style home at Ferndale Ranch near Santa Paula, California.

== Present day ==
The neighborhood now is known as the Doheny Campus of Mount St. Mary's University, Los Angeles. The school was first given rights to operate out of number 2 Chester Place in 1957. Estelle died in 1958 and left Chester Place to the Roman Catholic Archdiocese of Los Angeles, which transferred the land to Mount St. Mary's University, Los Angeles. The new Doheny campus opened in 1962 as the university's 2nd campus. The administration and teaching at the campus takes place in many of the historic mansions, although multiple new buildings have since been added to the campus. Estelle also left the easternmost portion of Chester Place bordering Figueroa Street to St. Vincent School.

== In media ==
The Victorian residence at 21 Chester Place in the West Adams District served as the primary basis for the Addams Family Mansion featured in the 1964 television series. Built in 1888, the house was used for exterior shots only in the first episode and in the series’ opening title sequence. The real structure was two stories high; for the series, a 30-by-40-inch photograph of the building was altered by a painter to add a third floor and a gothic tower.
