= Wilson W. Hoover =

American jurist (1849–1926)

William W. Hoover

Associate Justice, Arizona Territorial Supreme Court
- In office September 2, 1882 – March 23, 1883
- Nominated by: Chester A. Arthur
- Preceded by: William Henry Stilwell
- Succeeded by: A. W. Sheldon

Personal details
- Born: c. 1849 Iowa
- Died: February 22, 1926 New York City
- Party: Republican
- Spouse: May Josephine Williams (m. 1870)
- Profession: Attorney

Wilson Wood Hoover (Note: John Goff's biographical sketch of Hoover lists his middle name as Ward. However, all contemporary sources list his middle name as Wood or Woods, including a witness statement signed with his brother, his marriage record, and his Arizona voter registration.) (c. 1849 – February 22, 1926) was an American jurist who served as an associate justice of the Arizona Territorial Supreme Court from 1882 to 1883. He was suspended from office after a court clerk who had lost his job when Hoover came onto the bench began a campaign to remove the new justice.

== Background ==
Hoover was born to Elizabeth (Morrison) and David Hoover in Iowa in about 1849. Details of his early life have been lost. Hoover was admitted to the California bar on January 14, 1873. He lived for a time in San Jose, California before moving to Gilroy, California in early 1874. 1880 census records show he was working as a lawyer. Hoover and his wife, Mary, had a son, Lloyd, on April 3, 1874. The boy died before reaching two months of age. The couple had a second son, Harold.

President Chester A. Arthur nominated Hoover to replace William Henry Stilwell as an associate justice of the Arizona Territorial Supreme Court on July 20, 1882. Senate confirmation came on August 7 and Hoover arrived in Tucson, Arizona to take the oath of office on September 2. As Hoover had been in Washington during the confirmation process he returned to California to settle some personal matters, returning to the territory to begin a district court session on September 25, 1882. At the end of the session he reported to the United States Attorney General that he had tried 23 civil cases and reached a final verdict in 44 criminal trials.

During his confirmation hearings, Hoover had provided testimony in prosecutions related to the Star route scandal. As a favor to the Justice Department, he returned to Washington D.C. in mid-November 1882 to provide additional testimony. Hoover arrived in Prescott, Arizona Territory on January 4, 1883 for the session of the supreme court that had begun three days earlier. The session adjourned on January 8 before reconvening in Tucson on February 23 and ending on March 6, 1883. No opinions written by Hoover from the session survive, but the territorial press were impressed by his demeanor and legal ability.

While Hoover was traveling, Captain W. H. Seamans began efforts to have the new judge removed from the bench. Seamans had lost his job as Justice Stilwell's court clerk when Hoover took office. In addition to charges of misconduct while in office, Hoover was accused of being an associate of a "professional confidence man". Upon learning of the efforts, Hoover and his friend began a defense against the charges. In response to various letters to Washington and circulated petitions, the territorial bar discussed the issue during their January 1883 meeting and reported there was no basis for the charges leveled against Hoover. A vote during the bar's March 1883 meeting likewise rejected the accusations against the judge. Following the usual practice of the day, the United States Justice Department sent an agent to investigate the accusations against the judge. The investigation resulted in Hoover being suspended on March 23, 1883.

After leaving office, Hoover remained in Arizona Territory and practiced law in Tucson and Tombstone. During the mid-1880s, Arizona experienced an economic downturn, resulting in a glut of practicing attorneys. During early 1886, Hoover's wife and son moved east and the former Justice dissolved his legal practice by the end of the year. He settled in Brooklyn and opening the legal firm of Hoover & Sparrow in Manhattan. Hoover died in New York City on February 22, 1926. He was buried Hancock, New York's Riverview Cemetery.
