= Marcos Couch =

Argentine mountain climber

Marcos José Couch
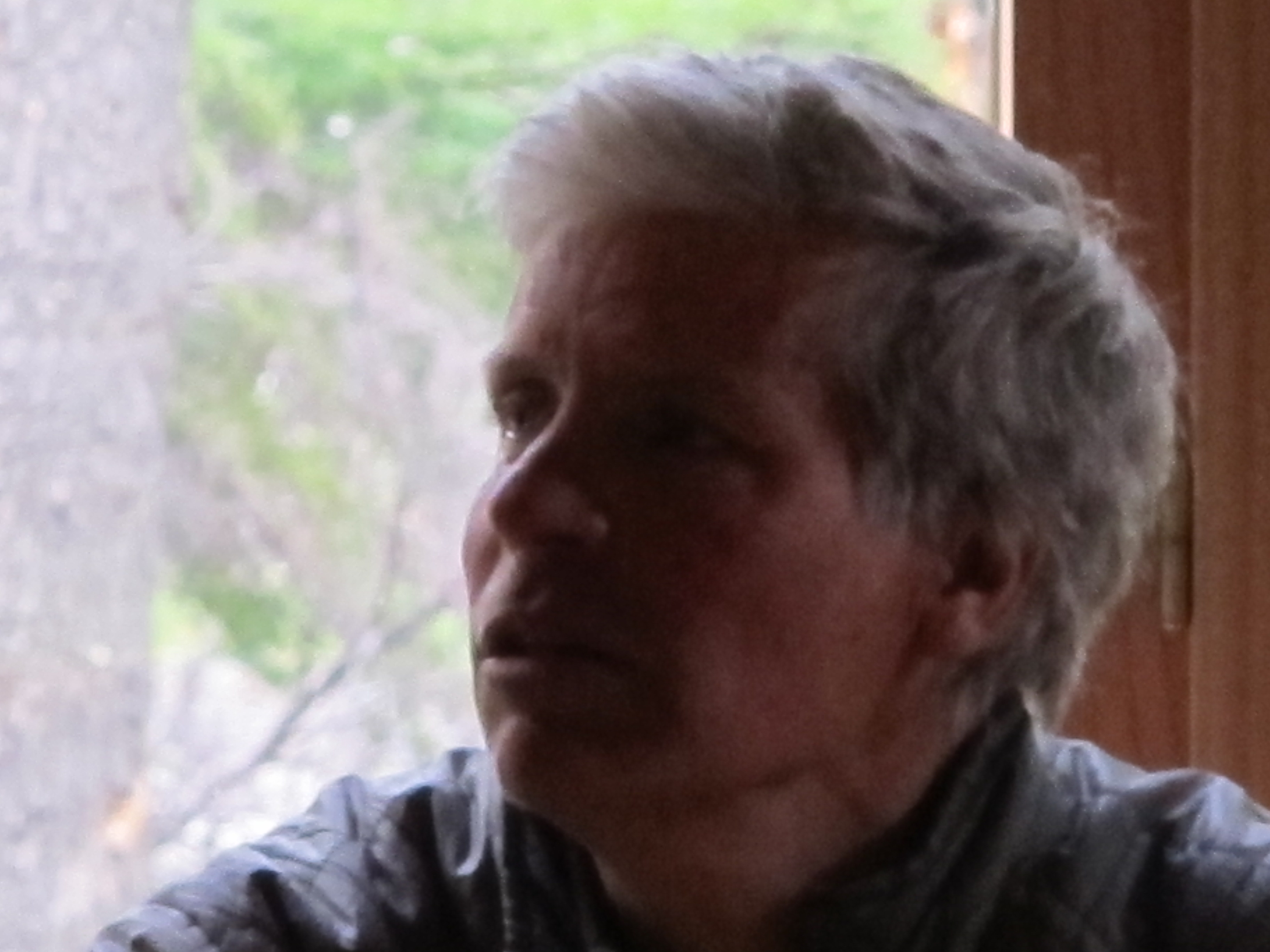
- Marcos Couch at El Chaltén in 2014
- Born: June 14, 1960; Ciudad de Buenos Aires, Argentina
- Occupations: Mountain guide, photographer
- Known for: Climbing Shishapangma in Tibet and Fitz Roy in Patagonia

Marcos José Couch (born June 14, 1960 in Buenos Aires), Argentine mountain climber, known for his professional achievements in mountains such as the Shishapangma in Tibet, or the Fitz Roy in Patagonia. Since 1987 he is a mountain guide and has been working internationally.

== Biography ==
Marcos Couch is the oldest son of Richard Arden Couch and Beatriz Melano. His father, US citizen, was Doctor in Theology and a priest at the US Presbyterian Church, and his mother, Argentine, was Master in Literature at the University of Buenos Aires and Doctor in Theology.

The professional activity of his parents gave him the experience of living in different countries during their childhood. They lived most of their lives in Buenos Aires, in the neighbor of Flores; but they also lived in Pittsburgh, USA (1963–64), Strasbourg, France (1970–71) and Bangalore, India (1978). His younger sisters are Ana Gabriela and Johanna Ruth.

== Career ==
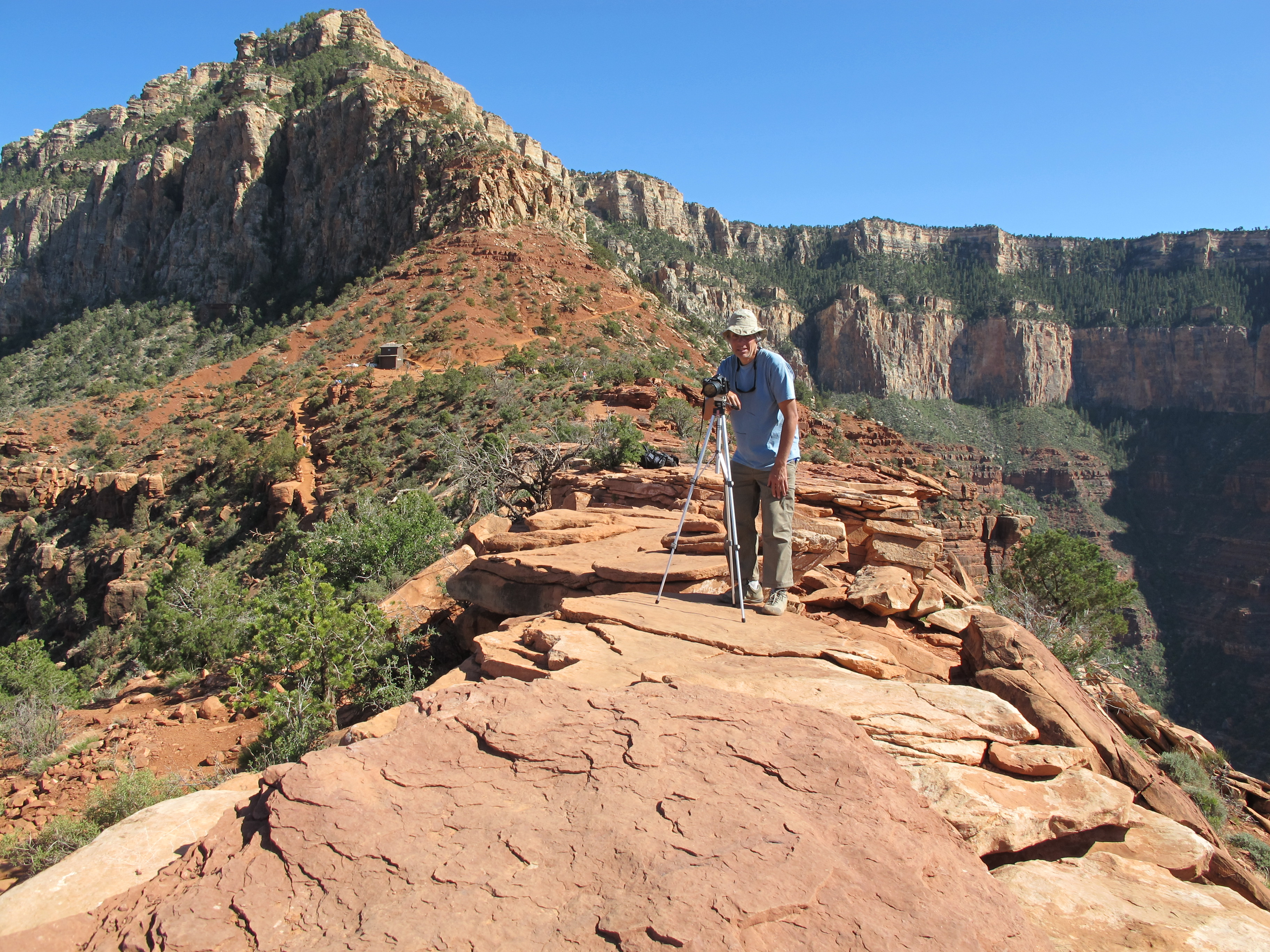
Marcos Couch in the Grand Canyon

Marcos Couch studied Philosophy at University Del Salvador in Buenos Aires and theater at the National School of Dramatic Art (today National University of Arts). However he dedicated his entire life to his third career, Mountain Guiding. He obtained his qualification from the AAGM (Asociación Argentina de Guías de Montaña), later ratify by the IFMGA (International Federation of Mountain Guides Association).

Thanks to his language skills, he worked for travel agencies located in France, Belgium, United States, United Kingdom and Canada, taking adventurous tourists to the mountains all over the globe.

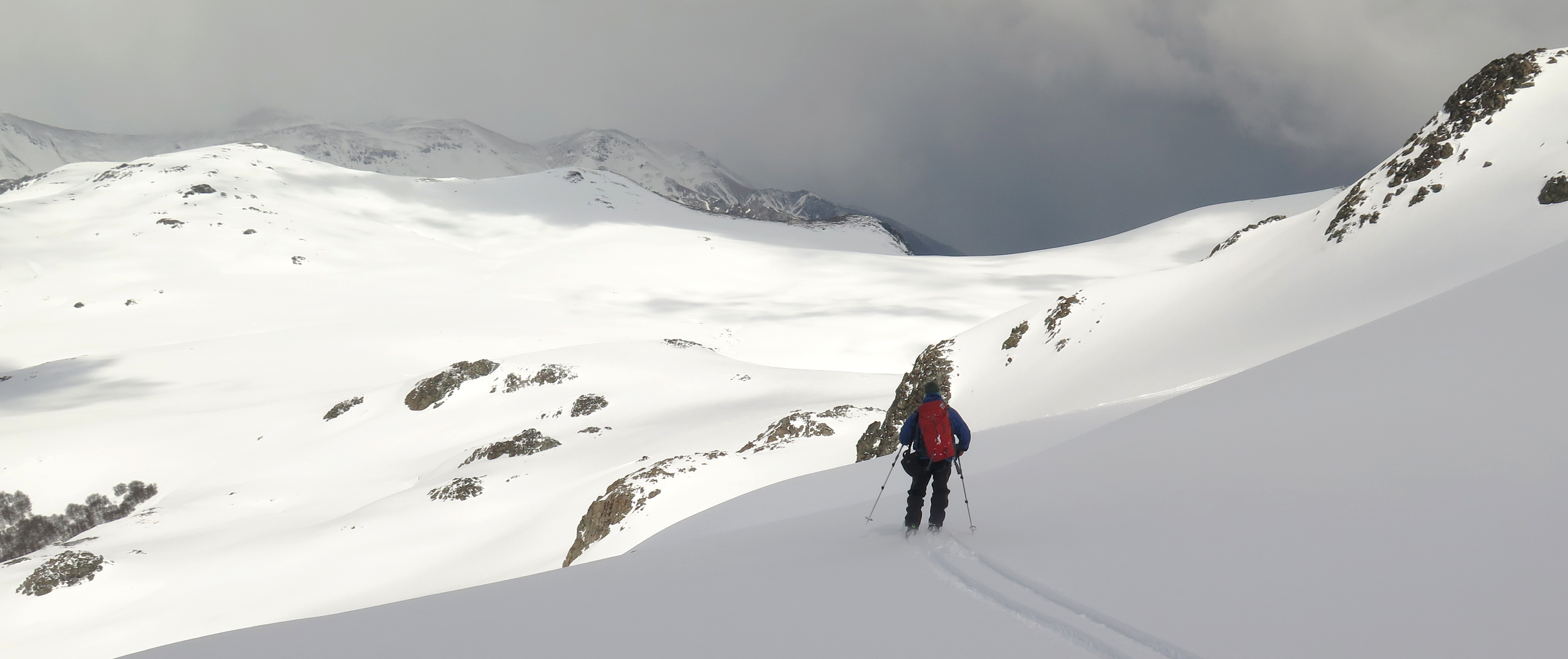
Backcountry

Marcos Couch started his mountain activity very young. At the age of 18 (1978) he was part of the second ascent to the Cerro Moreno, on the Southern Patagonian Ice Field. In 2004 he moved to Bariloche in the Argentine Patagonia where he enjoys practicing alpine ski, backcountry ski, windsurf, kayak paddling, climbing and hiking.

He has always been passionate about photography. Lately he published some of his work and displayed his photographs in San Carlos de Bariloche and Buenos Aires city.

== Notable activities ==
- 1978: Second ascent to the Cerro Moreno, Southern Patagonian Ice Field.
- 1979: Ice Climbing Course, Tronador, Argentina-Chile border.
- 1980: Kayak Paddling down river on the Huallaga River (500 kilometers) Peruvian Amazonia.
- 1980: Attempt to rice the Illimani (6500 meters) Bolivia.
- 1981: Attempt to rice the Mount Fitz Roy, Argentina-Chile border.
- 1982: Navigation of the Santa Cruz River, on an inflatable boat from the Andes to the Atlantic Ocean, Argentine Patagonia.
- 1982: Rock Climbing, Cerro Catedral, Río Negro Province, Argentine Patagonia.
- 1983: Winter climbing to the Agujas del Catedral (Bariloche, Argentine Patagonia) and Sierra de los Gigantes (Córdoba, Argentina).
- 1984: Opening of the Ruta Argentina (climbing route) on the Mount Fitz Roy, Patagonia, Argentina-Chile border.
- 1984: Crossing Ski through the Cerro Catedral (Argentina) and Cerro Tronador (Argentina-Chile border).
- 1985: Climb of the Shield Route at the El Capitán, Yosemite, USA.
- 1986: Crossing of the Southern Patagonian Ice Field and attempt to rise to the Cerro Torre.
- 1987: Crossing Ski Course of the Fédération Francaise de la Montagne and the Club Andino Bariloche (CAB).
- 1987: He starts his guiding for the Allibert Agency (France). Argentina: Aconcagua 6961 meters. Peru: Huascarán, 6800 metres, Ausangate 6400 meters, Chachani 6050 meters. Ecuador: Cotopaxi volcano. And also guiding in mountains of in India, Nepal and Tibet.
- 1988: Opening of the Vía del Orco (climbing route) at the Cerro Catedral, Argentine Patagonia.
- 1989: Thriatlon of Mar del Plata, Argentina.
- 1990: Fourth ascent to the Mount San Valentín, Northern Patagonian Ice Field, Chile as guide with the Accor group (France), Patagonia.
- 1991: Director of the ice climbing course, Cerro Tronador, Argentina-Chile border in Patagonia.
- 1992: North-South crossing the Southern Patagonian Ice Field.
- 1993: First Argentine successful expedition to the Shishapangma (8045 meters) Himalayas, Tibet.
- 1993: He was named President of the CABA (Club Andino Buenos Aires).
- 1997: Expedition to the Southern Patagonian Ice Field.
- 1997: 13th climb to the Mount San Lorenzo, Argentina-Chile border 3770 meters (achieving the summit with the whole group)
- 1997: New York City Marathon.
- 1997: Co-Producer of a documentary of the Southern Patagonian Ice Field for América TV.
- 1987–2000: Five climbs to the Cerro Aconcagua 6961 meters, Argentina.
- 1999: Climb of the Mezcalito Route, El Capitán, Yosemite, USA.
- 2003: Ascent to the Mount Kilimanjaro, Tanzania.
- 2012: Kayak paddling down river, Santa Cruz river, Argentine Patagonia.
- 2015: Ascent to the Cerro Pisco and Cerro Chopicalqui at the Cordillera Blanca, and the Cordillera Huayhuash, Peru.

== See also ==
- Shishapangma
