= Adaptation model of nursing =

Nursing theory by Sister Callista Roy

In 1976, Sister Callista Roy developed the Adaptation Model of Nursing, a prominent nursing theory. Nursing theories frame, explain or define the practice of nursing. Roy's model sees the individual as a set of interrelated systems (biological, psychological and social). The individual strives to maintain a balance between these systems and the outside world, but there is no absolute level of balance. Individuals strive to live within a unique band in which he or she can cope adequately.

== Overview of the theory ==
This model comprises the four domain concepts of person, health, environment, and nursing; it also involves a six-step nursing process. Andrews & Roy (1991) state that the person can be a representation of an individual or a group of individuals. Roy's model sees the person as "a biopsychosocial being in constant interaction with a changing environment". The person is an open, adaptive system who uses coping skills to deal with stressors. Roy sees the environment as "all conditions, circumstances and influences that surround and affect the development and behaviour of the person". Roy describes stressors as stimuli and uses the term residual stimuli to describe those stressors whose influence on the person is not clear. Originally, Roy wrote that health and illness are on a continuum with many different states or degrees possible. More recently, she states that health is the process of being and becoming an integrated and whole person. Roy's goal for nursing is "the promotion of adaptation in each of the four modes, thereby contributing to the person's health, quality of life and dying with dignity". These four modes are physiological, self-concept, role function and interdependence.

Roy employs a six-step nursing process: assessment of behaviour; assessment of stimuli; nursing diagnosis; goal setting; intervention and evaluation. In the first step, the person's behaviour in each of the four modes is observed. This behaviour is compared with norms and is deemed either adaptive or ineffective. The second step is concerned with factors that influence behaviour. Stimuli are classified as focal, contextual or residual. The nursing diagnosis is the statement of the ineffective behaviours along with the identification of the probable cause. This is typically stated as the nursing problem related to the focal stimuli, forming a direct relationship. In the fourth step, goal setting is the focus. Goals need to be realistic and attainable and are set in collaboration with the person. There are usually both short term and long-term goals that the nurse sets for the patient. Intervention occurs as the fifth step, and this is when the stimuli are manipulated. It is also called the 'doing phase' . In the final stage, evaluation takes place. The degree of change as evidenced by change in behaviour, is determined. Ineffective behaviours would be reassessed, and the interventions would be revised.

The model had its inception in 1964 when Roy was a graduate student. She was challenged by nursing faculty member Dorothy E. Johnson to develop a conceptual model for nursing practice. Roy's model drew heavily on the work of Harry Helson, a physiologic psychologist. The Roy adaptation model is generally considered a "systems" model; however, it also includes elements of an "interactional" model. The model was developed specifically for the individual client, but it can be adapted to families and to communities (Roy, 1983). Roy states (Clements and Roberts, 1983) that "just as the person as an adaptive system has input, output. and internal processes so too the family can be described from this perspective."

Basic to Roy's model are three concepts: the human being, adaptation, and nursing. The human being is viewed as a biopsychosocial being who is continually interacting with the environment. The human being's goal through this interaction is adaptation. According to Roy and Roberts (1981, p. 43), ‘The person has two major internal processing subsystems, the regulator and the cognator." These subsystems are the mechanisms used by human beings to cope with stimuli from the internal and external environment. The regulator mechanism works primarily through the autonomic nervous system and includes endocrine, neural, and perception pathways. This mechanism prepares the individual for coping with environmental stimuli. The cognator mechanism includes emotions, perceptual/information processing, learning, and judgment. The process of perception bridges the two mechanisms (Roy and Roberts, 1981).

== Types of Stimuli ==
- Three types of stimuli influence an individual's ability to cope with the environment. These include focal stimuli, contextual stimuli, and residual stimuli. Focal stimuli are those that immediately confront the individual in a particular situation. Focal stimuli for a family include individual needs; the level of family adaptation; and changes within the family members, among the members and in the family environment (Roy, 1983). Contextual stimuli are those other stimuli that influence the situation. Residual stimuli include the individual's beliefs or attitudes that may influence the situation. Many times this is the nurse's "hunch" about other factors that can affect the problem. Contextual and residual stimuli for a family system include nurturance, socialization, and support (Roy, 1983). Adaptation occurs when the total stimuli fall within the individual's/family's adaptive capacity, or zone of adaptation. The inputs for a family include all of the stimuli that affect the family as a group. The outputs of the family system are three basic goals: survival, continuity, and growth (Roy, 1983). Roy states (Clements and Roberts, 1983):
- Since adaptation level results from the pooled effect of all other relevant stimuli, the nurse examines the contextual and residual stimuli associated with the focal stimulus to ascertain the zone within which positive family coping can take place and to predict when the given stimulus is outside that zone and will require nursing intervention.

== Four Modes of Adaptation ==
Levine believes that an individual's adaptation occurs in four different modes. This also holds true for families (Hanson, 1984). These include the physiologic mode, the self-concept mode, the role function mode, and the interdependence mode.

The individual's regulator mechanism is involved primarily with the physiologic mode, whereas the cognator mechanism is involved in all four modes (Roy and Roberts, 1981). The family goals correspond to the model's modes of adaptation: survival = physiologic mode; growth = self-concept mode; continuity = role function mode. Transactional patterns fall into the interdependence mode (Clements and Roberts, 1983).

In the physiologic mode, adaptation involves the maintenance of physical integrity. Basic human needs such as nutrition, oxygen, fluids, and temperature regulation are identified with this mode (Fawcett, 1984). In assessing a family, the nurse would ask how the family provides for the physical and survival needs of the family members. A function of the self-concept mode is the need for maintenance of psychic integrity. Perceptions of one's physical and personal self are included in this mode. Families also have concepts of themselves as a family unit. Assessment of the family in this mode would include the amount of understanding provided to the family members, the solidarity of the family, the values of the family, the amount of companionship provided to the members, and the orientation (present or future) of the family (Hanson, 1984).

The need for social integrity is emphasized in the role function mode. When human beings adapt to various role changes that occur throughout a lifetime, they are adapting in this mode. According to Hanson (1984), the family's role can be assessed by observing the communication patterns in the family. Assessment should include how decisions are reached, the roles and communication patterns of the members, how role changes are tolerated, and the effectiveness of communication (Hanson, 1984). For example, when a couple adjusts their lifestyle appropriately following retirement from full-time employment, they are adapting in this mode.

The need for social integrity is also emphasized in the interdependence mode. Interdependence involves maintaining a balance between independence and dependence in one's relationships with others. Dependent behaviors include affection seeking, help seeking, and attention seeking. Independent behaviors include mastery of obstacles and initiative taking. According to Hanson (1984), when assessing this mode in families, the nurse tries to determine how successfully the family lives within a given community. The nurse would assess the interactions of the family with the neighbors and other community groups, the support systems of the family, and the significant others (Hanson, 1984).

The goal of nursing is to promote adaptation of the client during both health and illness in all four of the modes. Actions of the nurse begin with the assessment process, The family is assessed on two levels. First, the nurse makes a judgment with regard to the presence or absence of maladaptation. Then, the nurse focuses the assessment on the stimuli influencing the family's maladaptive behaviors. The nurse may need to manipulate the environment, an element or elements of the client system, or both in order to promote adaptation.

Many nurses, as well as schools of nursing, have adopted the Roy adaptation model as a framework for nursing practice. The model views the client in a holistic manner and contributes significantly to nursing knowledge. The model continues to undergo clarification and development by the author.

== Applying Roy’s Model to Family Assessment ==
When using Roy's model as a theoretical framework, the following can serve as a guide for the assessment of families.

- I. Adaptation Modes
  - A. Physiologic Mode
    - 1. To what extent is the family able to meet the basic survival needs of its members?
    - 2. Are any family members having difficulty meeting basic survival needs?
  - B. Self-Concept Mode
    - 1. How does the family view itself in terms of its ability to meet its goals and to assist its members to achieve their goals? To what extent do they see themselves as self-directed? Other directed?
    - 2. What are the values of the family?
    - 3. Describe the degree of companionship and understanding given to the family members
  - C. Role Function Mode
    - 1. Describe the roles assumed by the family members.
    - 2. To what extent are the family roles supportive, in conflict, reflective of role overload?
    - 3. How are family decisions reached?
  - D. Interdependence Mode
    - 1. To what extent are family members and subsystems within the family allowed to be independent in goal identification and achievement (e.g., adolescents)?
    - 2. To what extent are the members supportive of one another?
    - 3. What are the family's support systems? Significant others?
    - 4. To what extent is the family open to information and assistance from outside the family unit? Willing to assist other families outside the family unit?
    - 5. Describe the interaction patterns of the family In the community.
- II. Adaptive Mechanisms
  - A. Regulator: Physical status of the family in terms of health? i.e., nutritional state, physical strength, availability of physical resources
  - B. Cognator: Educational level, knowledge base of family, source of decision making, power base, degree of openness in the system to input, ability to process
- III. Stimuli
  - A. Focal
    - 1. What are the major concerns of the family at this time?
    - 2. What are the major concerns of the individual members?
    - 3. This is usually related to the nursing diagnoses or the main stimuli causing the problem behaviors. It is important for the nurse to try to fix this before they can fix the problem behaviors as they are related to each other.
  - B. Contextual
    - 1. What elements in the family structure, dynamic, and environment are impinging on the manner and degree to which the family can cope with and adapt to their major concerns (i.e., financial and physical resources, presence or absence of support systems, clinical setting and so on)?
    - These can be either negative or positive as it relates to the main nursing problem.
  - C. Residual
    - 1. What knowledge, skills, beliefs, and values of this family must be considered as the family attempts to adapt (i.e., stage of development, cultural background, spiritual/religious beliefs, goals, expectations)? This is normally an assumption that the nurse has that could impact care. One could describe it as one's educational guess about something going on in the patient's life that could be further contributing to the problem.

The nurse assesses the degree to which the family's actions in each mode are leading to positive coping and adaptation to the focal stimuli. If coping and adaptation are not health promoting, assessment of the types of stimuli and the effectiveness of the regulators provides the basis for the design of nursing interventions to promote adaptation.

By answering each of these questions in each assessment, a nurse can have a full understanding of the problem's a patient may be having. It is important to recognize each stimuli because without it, not every aspect of the person's problem can be confronted and fixed. As a nurse, it is their job to recognize all of these modes, mechanisms, and stimuli while taking care of a patient. They do so through the use of their advanced knowledge of the nursing process as well as with interviews with the individuals and the family members.

Callista Roy maintains there are four main adaptation systems, which she calls modes of adaptation. She calls these the 1. the physiological - physical system 2. the self-concept group identity system 3. the role mastery/function system 4. the interdependency system.

== See also ==
- Nursing theory

== Bibliography ==
- Aggleton, P.; Chalmers, H. (October 3, 1984). "The Roy adaptation model". Nursing Times.
- Roy, C. (1980). "The Roy Adaptation Model". In Riehl, J. P.; Roy, C. (eds.). Conceptual Models for Nursing Practice. Norwalk: Appleton: Century Crofts. ISBN 978-0-8385-1200-5.
- Andrews, H.; Roy, C. (1991). The Adaptation Model. Norwalk: Appleton & Lange. ISBN 978-0-8385-2272-1.
- Rambo, B. (1984). Adaptive Nursing. Philadelphia: W.B. Saunders Company.
