= William Henry Stilwell =

American jurist (1849–1928)

Associate Justice, Arizona Territorial Supreme Court
- In office February 1881 – September 2, 1882
- Nominated by: Rutherford B. Hayes
- Preceded by: Charles Silent
- Succeeded by: Wilson W. Hoover

Personal details
- Born: May 24, 1849 St. Lawrence County, New York
- Died: May 8, 1928 (aged 78) Phoenix, Arizona
- Party: Republican
- Spouse: Harriet Newell Bean
- Profession: Attorney

William Henry Stilwell (Note: It was common for contemporary sources to misspell Stilwell's name as "Stillwell".) (May 24, 1849 – May 8, 1928) was an American jurist who served as Associate Justice of the Arizona Territorial Supreme Court from 1880 till 1882. Following his removal from the bench, he remained in the territory where he was active in Republican politics and became an expert in mining law and water rights.

== Early life ==
Stilwell was born on May 24, 1849, in St. Lawrence County, New York, to Mary (Brazee) and James Stilwell. He was educated in public schools at Ogdensburg, New York, Gouverneur Wesleyan Seminary, and Potsdam Normal School before his graduation from the Albany Law School in 1875. Following graduation, Stilwell moved to New York City where he worked for the legal firm of Peckham & Tremain.

Stilwell's involvement in national politics began in July 1878. When President Rutherford B. Hayes replaced Chester A. Arthur with Edwin A. Merritt as Collector of the Port of New York, Stilwell became Merritt's assistant. In this role he acted as official secretary and also assisted the custom house's legal department.

His promotion to the bench came when President Hayes gave Stilwell a recess appointment as Associate Justice to the Arizona Territorial Supreme Court. The new justice was commissioned on December 3, 1880, and arrived in the territory in February of the next year. Initially assigned to Prescott, at the time Chief Justice C. G. W. French was requesting reassignment away from the southern portion of the territory. When Stilwell had no objections, the 11th Arizona Territorial Legislature granted the Chief Justice his request and assigned Stilwell to oversee Cochise, Graham, Pima, and Pinal counties. During his time on the bench Stilwell authored no legal opinions as Chief Justice French reserved this task for himself.

While on the bench, Stilwell became involved in several political disputes. As part of the efforts to force Governor John C. Frémont to either resign or return to the territory so he could perform his duties of office, Stilwell was proposed as a possible replacement. Conversely there were calls to have the judge removed from the bench. Complaints against Stilwell emphasized his supposed lack of experience and maturity. In a May 1881 letter from Tombstone attorney Thomas Fitch to Senator John Franklin Miller admitted that no specific actions justified Stilwell's removal but that the judge was still too inexperienced to remain. What importance a number of pending cases with large potential financial impact had on the call for the judges removal is unknown. President Chester A. Arthur nominated Wilson W. Hoover to replace Stilwell, as part of a mass removal that saw almost every territorial official replaced in the wake of Governor Frémont's resignation. No reason was given for Stilwell's removal and the judge was in California recovering from an illness at time he received the news. He served until his successor was sworn in on September 2, 1882.

Following his removal, remained in Arizona and became a respected member of the legal community. He moved to Tombstone and opened a private legal practice. There he became an expert in mining law. Stilwell was a representative to the Republican territorial convention in 1888 and was elected to a two-year term as Cochise County attorney beginning in January 1889.

Stilwell married Harriet Newell Bean, daughter of Southern Pacific Railroad official A. A. Bean, in 1885. The couple had three children, a son who died from an accident before reaching maturity and two daughters who reached adulthood. During their later years the couple separated with Mrs. Stilwell living in New York.

After leaving his position as Cochise County attorney in 1891, Stilwell moved to Phoenix. About this time he was also considered for appointment as a United States Attorney. In 1894 the former judge joined with Henry N. Alexander to form the legal firm of Alexander and Stilwell. With the outbreak of the Spanish–American War, Stilwell was commissioned a major in the United States Army. Posted in Washington, D.C., and San Francisco, California, the former judge served the paymaster department by developing a streamlined system for paying the troops. Following the war, Stilwell returned to his private legal practice.

During his legal career, Stilwell argued multiple cases in front of the Arizona Territorial Supreme Court and appeared before the United States Supreme Court. While operating a general practice, his primary areas of specialization were mining law and water rights. His most influential case came when he joined with Joseph Henry Kibbey to represent the plaintiff in Slosser v. Salt River Canal Company (1901), 7 Arizona 376, a case that confirmed the "Kibbey Decision" that water rights belonged to the land they were associated with and not to the owner of the land.

In 1916, Stilwell lost a primary contest for the Republican nomination for U.S. Senator to Kibbey by a vote of 1857 to 4775. During the Republican state convention of 1928, Stilwell became ill. By the time he returned to his Phoenix home, the illness had become pneumonia. Stilwell died on May 8, 1928, and was buried Phoenix's Greenwood Memorial Park.

== See also ==
- Gunfight at the O.K. Corral
- Wyatt Earp
- Johnny Behan
