= Gary James Jason =

American philosopher

- Born: October 21, 1949 (age 76); Pittsburgh, Pennsylvania
- Occupation: Philosopher
- Known for: Argumentation, Informal Logic, Logic, Philosophy of Science

Gary James Jason (born October 21, 1949) is an American philosopher. He is well known for his work in argumentation theory, propaganda theory, mathematical logic and informal logic, and the philosophy of science. He is the author of texts on critical thinking and logic, among other books.

== Career ==
Jason received his B.A. degrees in Physics and Philosophy from the University of California, Los Angeles in 1971, his M.A. in Philosophy from the University of Illinois Urbana-Champaign in 1976, his Ph.D. in Philosophy (in the History and Philosophy of Science program) from the University of Illinois Urbana-Champaign in 1982, and his M.S. in Computer Science from Kansas State University in 1986. He taught at Mount St. Mary's College and Loyola Marymount University from 1975 to 1979, at San Diego State University from 1979 to 1984, at Washburn University from 1984 to 1986, and at San Diego State University from 1986 to 1998. From 2002 to the present, he has been at California State University, Fullerton.

== Selected works ==
- The Critical Thinking Book (Peterborough, ON: Broadview Press, 2021)
- Cinematic Thoughts: Essays on Film and the Philosophy of Film (Bern, Switzerland: Peter Lang Publishers, 2021)
- Purchase, Power, and Persuasion: Essays on Political Philosophy (Bern, Switzerland: Peter Lang Publishers, 2021)
- The Critical Thinking Book (Peterborough, ON: Broadview Press, 2020)
- Philosophic Thoughts: Essays on Logic and Philosophy (Bern, Switzerland: Peter Lang Publishers, 2013)
- Critical Thinking: Developing and Effective Worldview (Belmont, California: Wadsworth, 2001)
- Introduction to Logic (Belmont, California: Wadsworth, 1994)
- The Logic of Scientific Discovery (Bern, Switzerland: Peter Lang Publishers, 1988)
