= María Pilar Aquino =

American Catholic feminist theologian (born 1956)

- Born: María Pilar Aquino; March 6, 1956; Nayarit, Mexico

Academic background
- Education: Theological Institute of Higher Studies in Mexico City; Pontifical University of Salamanca in Madrid
- Thesis: Our Cry for Life. Latin American Theology from the Perspective of Women (1992)

Academic work
- Discipline: Theology
- School or tradition: Latin American liberation theology; Catholicism; Christian feminist
- Institutions: Mount St. Mary's University, Los Angeles; University of San Diego
- Main interests: Latina Theological feminism; transnational feminism

María Pilar Aquino (born March 6, 1956) is a Mexican-born American Catholic feminist theologian. She is currently Professor Emerita, Theology and Religious Studies, at the University of San Diego. Her primary areas of teaching and research were liberation theologies, social ethics, and feminist theologies.

She continues to serve on national and international editorial boards of prominent theological journals. Her 1992 book, Nuestro clamor por la vida. Teología latinoamericana desde la perspectiva de la mujer (Our Cry for Life. Latin American Theology from the Perspective of Women), stands out among her theological works and has been essential for the articulation of the feminist Latin American theology of liberation, especially in the fields of ecclesiology, spirituality, interculturality, and Latin American theology in the U.S.

== Early years ==
Aquino was born into a rural family in Ixtlán del Río, Nayarit, Mexico on March 6, 1956. Her parents participated in the Bracero Program and emigrated to San Luis, Arizona, where she had contact with César Chávez's farm workers movement. From the age of 18 until 1983, Aquino belonged to the Society of Helpers of the Souls in Purgatory, an Ignatian spiritualist female congregation of French origin, devoted to caring for the most vulnerable. Aquino acknowledges that, as a young catechist, she was influenced by liberationist Catholic nuns working on the U.S.-Mexico border.

== Studies and academic activities ==
Aquino obtained her degree in theology at the now-defunct Theological Institute of Higher Studies in Mexico City, and her degree was validated by the Pontifical Catholic University of Rio Grande do Sul in Porto Alegre, Brazil. In 1991, she obtained a doctorate in theology from the Pontifical University of Salamanca in Madrid, under the supervision of Casiano Floristán, a professor of practical theology. She was the first Catholic woman to earn a doctorate in theology from this university.

She was Professor of Theology at Mount Saint Mary's University, Los Angeles, a women's university of the Congregation of the Sisters of St. Joseph of Carondelet. She was on the board of directors of the Catholic Theological Society of America, and was a member of the advisory committee of the international theology journal Concilium. In 2000, she received an honorary doctorate from the University of Helsinki. She participated in the founding of the Academy of Hispanic Catholic Theologians in the U.S., and served as its president in 1993.

In 1988, she brought together Latin American theologians for the Intercontinental Conference of Third World Women Theologians, held in 1986 in Oaxtepec, Mexico, organized by the Women's Commission of the Ecumenical Association of Third World Theologians. (ASETT/EATWOT). The motto of the meeting was "Theology from the perspective of Third World women". During the Congress, topics such as biblical hermeneutics, Christology, ecclesiology, and spirituality were discussed.

She was co-founder and first President of the Academy of Catholic Hispanic Theologians of the United States. She was a member of the USD Theology and Religious Studies faculty from 1993 to 2018 and was named Professor Emerita in the College of Arts and Sciences in 2019.

== Feminist liberation theology ==
In her first forays into theology, Aquino was strongly influenced by the work and thought of Elisabeth Schüssler Fiorenza. For Aquino, theology is understood "as a discipline […] that articulates the language of faith. It refers to an experience of life, rather than a speculative exposition of abstract truths."

Aquino has been critical of both Latin American liberation theology and U.S. Hispanic theology. Of the first, she questions its androcentric perspective; the second, its assimilation of the paradigms of liberal modernity and its excessive emphasis on cultural identity issues, disdaining the socioeconomic reality of Latinos and Latinas in the U.S. and in Latin America.

In 1992, her doctoral thesis, Nuestro clamor por la vida. Teología latinoamericana desde la perspectiva de la mujer (Our Cry for Life. Latin American Theology from the Perspective of Women) was published, in which she details the specific contribution of women to the historic processes of change and the theology of liberation, as subjects of reflection and not as mere objects of study. She also proposes a new relationship between compassion and passion for relieving the suffering of others.

According to Aquino, the assumptions of theological production from the perspective of Latin American women include:

1. A unitary anthropology, centered on the human being, egalitarian, realistic, and multidimensional.
2. The use of the word as a means to express their own understanding of their identity as full subjects.
3. Sexuality as an inherent dimension of human existence, a source of liberation, and a fundamental part in the construction of identity.
4. The logic of life and resistance as an expression of the defense of life and as a rejection of submission to the sexist socioeconomic system.
5. Creativity as a manifestation of the collective strength of women.
6. Compelling solidarity, understood as a genuine compassionate inclination.
7. Freedom as abandonment of the paths that enslave, the development of new paths, and the practice of original possibilities.
8. Hope in a new future where life triumphs over death, truth over lies, good over evil, love over hate, justice over injustice, solidarity over selfishness, and grace over sin.

Other characteristics of Aquino's feminist theology are socio-analytic mediation, biblical interpretations of distrust, hermeneutical humiliations of women in the Bible, and the importance of the Bible in women's lives as a source of revelation.

In the work Latin American Feminist Theology, co-authored with Elsa Tamez, Aquino argues for a Latin American feminist theology based on the following points:

1. Daily life, which opens various windows for the construction of an alternative project to the present reality.
2. The experience of women as participants in new political, religious, and theological practices.
3. Gender awareness, which implies a change in the understanding of God as a creative force for well-being and not as "an eternal patriarchal being sitting on the throne."
4. The logic of life in its entirety, its integral development and ecological equilibrium balance against the destructive logic of death.
5. One's subjectivity through the recovery of self-esteem, value, and power.
6. The historical memory of the emancipatory traditions of women.
7. The authority of women as social agents in the face of their invisibility in the historic processes of transformation.
8. The practice of affection as an alternative to dehumanizing practices in order to overcome conceptual coldness.
9. The vital relationship between reason and passion.
10. Alternative ecumenism.

== Works ==
=== Books ===
- Aportes para una Teología desde la Mujer [Contributions for a Theology from Women], Biblia y Fe, Madrid, 1988.
- Our Cry for Life. Latin American Theology from the Perspective of Women, Orbis Books, Maryknoll, NY, 1993.
- La Teología, La Iglesia y La Mujer en América Latina [Theology, the Church and Women in Latin America], Yendo-American Press, Bogotá, Colombia, 1994.
- Teología Feminista Latinoamerica [Latin American Feminist Theology], coauthored with Elsa Tamez, Ed. Abya-Yala, Quito, Ecuador, 1998.
- Entre la Indignación y la Esperanza. Teología Feminista Latinoamerica [Between Indignation and Hope. Latin-american Feminist Theology], coauthored with con Ana María Tepedino, Ed., Yendo-American Press and ASETT/EATWOT Ecumenical Association of Third-World Theologists, Bogotá, Colombia, 1998.
- Theology: Expanding the Borders, coauthored with Roberto Goizueta, The Annual Publication of the College Theology Society, Vol. 43, Twenty-Third Publications, Mystic, CT, 1998.
- Religion, Feminism, and Justice. Foundations of Latina Feminist Theology, coauthored with Jeanette Rodríguez and Daisy L. Hacha, University of Texas Press, Austin, TX, 2002.
- En el Poder de la Sabiduría: Espiritualidades Feministas en lucha [In the Power of Wisdom: Feminist Spirituality in Struggle], coauthored with Elisabeth Schüssler Fiorenza, Concilium 288, Verbo Divino, Estella, Navarra- Spain, 2000.
- El Retorno de la Guerra Justa [The Return of the Just War], coauthored with Dietmar Mieth, Concilium 290, Verbo Divino, Estella, Navarra-Spain, 2001.
- The Reader in Latina Feminist Theology, Religion and Justice, coauthored with Daisy L. Hacha and Jeanette Rodríguez, University of Texas Press, Austin, TX, 2002.
- Reconciliación en un Mundo de Conflictos [Reconciliation in a World of Conflicts], coauthored with Luiz Carlos Susin, Concilium 303, Verbo Divino, Estella, Navarra-Spain, 2003.
- Feminist Intercultural Theology: Latina Explorations for a Just World, coauthored with Maria José Rosado-Nunes, Orbis Books, Maryknoll, NY, 2007.

=== Selected articles ===
- "Presencia de la mujer en la tradición profética" ["Presence of Women in the Prophetic Tradition"], Serve 88-89, Mexico City, 1980, pp. 535–558.
- "El culto a María y María en el culto" ["The Worship of Mary and Mary in Worship"], FEM Feminist Publication, Vol. 5/20, Mexico City, 1981-1982, pp. 41–46.
- "Mujer y Iglesia. Participación de la Mujer en la presencia de la Iglseia" ["Woman and Church. Participation of Women in the Presence of the Church"] in Aportes para una Teología desde la Mujer in Contributions for a Theology from Women, Biblia y Fe, Madrid, 1988, pp. 94–101.
- "Qué es hacer teología desde la perspective de la mujer, iglesia y derechos humanos" ["What Theology Means from the Perspective of Women, the Church and Human Rights"], Ninth Congress of Theology, Joaquín Ruiz-Giménez (ed.) Evangelio y Liberación, Madrid, 1989, pp. 175–189.
- "Bienaventurados los perseguidos y los que buscan la paz: Sal Terrae" ["Blessed are the Persecuted and Those Seeking Peace: Salt of the Earth"], Revista de Teología Pastoral 1,2, Santander, Spain, 1989, pp. 895–907.
- "Mujer y Praxis ministerial hoy. La respuesta del Tercer Mundo" ["Women and Ministerial Practice Today. The Response of the Third World"], in Mujer y Ministerio. Fundamento bíblico y praxis ecclesial [Women and the Ministry. Biblical Foundation and Ecclesial Practice], Escuela Bíblica y Fe, Revista de Teología Bíblica, no. 46, Madrid, 1990, pp. 116–139.
- "Sin contar las mujeres (Mt 14:21). Perspectiva latinoamericana de la teología feminista" ["Without Counting the Women (Mt 14:21). Latin American Perspective on Feminist Theology"], in La Mujer en la Iglesia [Women and the Church], Fernando Urbina de la Quintana (ed.), Pastoral Misionera 178/179, Editorial Popular, Madrid, 1991, pp. 103–122.
- "The Challenge of Latina Women" in International Review, April, 1992, pp. 261–268.
- "Women in Prophetic Vision. Pastoral Reflections on the National Pastoral Plan in the Hispanic Ministry", Soledad Galerón and Rosa María Icaza (eds.) Sheed & Ward, 1992, pp. 142–162, 316-335.
- "Making Theology from the Perspective of Latin American Women" in We are the People! Initiatives in Hispanic American Theology, Roberto S. Goizueta (ed.), Fortress Press, Minneapolis, MN, 1992, pp. 79–105.
- "Perspectives on Latina Feminist Liberation Theology" in Frontiers of Hispanic Theology in the United States, Allan Figueroa Deck (ed.), Orbis Books, Maryknoll, NY, 1992, pp. 23–40.
- "Teología y Mujer en América Latina" ["Theology and Women in Latin America"] in Y Dios Creó a la Mujer [And God Created Woman], Twelfth Congress of Theology, José María Diez Alegría (ed.) Evangelio y Liberación, Madrid, 1993, pp. 125–140; América Latina: Reflexión y Liberación IV/15, Santiago, Chile, 1992, pp. 27–40.
- "Directions and Foundations of Hispanic/Latino Theology: Toward a Mestiza Theology of Liberation", Journal of Hispanic/Latino Theology, November 1993, pp. 5–21. Reprinted in Mestizo Christianity. Theology from the Latino Perspective, Arturo J. Bañuelas (ed.), Orbis Books, Maryknoll, NY, 1995), pp. 191–208.
- "Feminismo" ["Feminism"] in Conceptos Fundamentales del Cristianismo [Fundamental Concepts of Christianity], Casiano Floristán and Juan José Tamayo (eds.), Trotta, Madrid, 1993), pp. 509–524.
- "Mujer" ["Woman"] in Diccionario de Pastoral, [Pastoral Dictionary], Benjamín Bravo (ed.), B. Bravo, Mexico City, 1994), pp. 130–133.
- "Santo Domingo Through the Eyes of Women" in Santo Domingo and Beyond. Documents and Commentaries From the Historic Meeting of the Latin American Bishops Conference, Alfred T. Hennelly (ed.), Orbis Books, Maryknoll, NY, 1994, pp. 212–225.
- "Trazos Hacia una Antropología Teológica Feminista. Una Mirada desde la Teología Feminista Latinoamericana" ["Traces of a Feminist Theological Anthropology. A Glance at Latin American Feminist Theology"], in Reflexión y Liberación 23, Santiago, Chile, 1994, pp. 43–58.
- "Including Women's Experience: The Latina Feminist Perspective" in In the Embrace of God. Feminist Approaches to Theological Anthropology, Ann El'Hara Graff (ed.), Orbis Books, Maryknoll, NY, 1995, pp. 51–70.
- "Teología Feminista Latinoamericana. Evolución y Desafíos" ["Latin American Feminist Theology. Evolution and Challenges"], Tópicos '90, Cuadernos de Estudio 7, Santiago, Chile, January, 1995, pp. 107–122.
- "Hearing One Another into Speech" in Women and Theology, Mary Ann Hinsdale and Phillis Kaminski (eds.), Orbis Books, Maryknoll, NY, 1995, pp. 99–104.
- "What's in a Name? Exploring the Dimensions of What 'Feminist Studies in Religion' Means," Journal of Feminist Studies in Religion 11/1 (Spring 1995), pp. 115–119;
- "Evil and Hope: Reflection from the Victims. Response to Jon Sabrino" in Proceedings of the Fiftieth Annual Convention of the Catholic Theological Society of America, Paul Crowley (ed.), Vol. 50, New York: CTSA, 1995, pp. 85–92.
- "Colonization and Latin American Feminist Theology" in Dictionary of Feminist Theologies, Letty M. Russell and J. Shannon Clarkson (ed.), Westminster John Knox Press, Louisville, Kentucky, 1996, pp. 50, 114-116.
- "The Collective Discovery of Our Own Power: Latina American Feminist Theology" in Hispanic/Latino Theology. Challenge and Promise, Ada María Isasi-Díaz and Fernando F. Segovia (eds.), (Minneapolis, MN: Fortress Press, 1996), pp. 240–258. Reprinted in Five Centuries of Hispanic American Christianity (1492-1992), APUNTES 13/1 (Spring 1993), pp. 86–103.
- "Una Vida en Estado de Justicia. La Matriz Feminista de la Iglesia" ["A Life in a state of Justice. The Feminist Matrix of the Church"] in Cristianismo y Liberación. Homenaje a Casiano Floristán [Christianity and Liberation. Homage to Casiano Floristán], Juan José Tomayo-Acosta (ed.), Trotta, Madrid, 1996, pp. 141–158.
- "Economic Violence in Latin American Perspective", in Women Resisting Violence. Spirituality for Life, Mary John Mananzan (ed.), Orbis Books, Maryknoll, NY, 1996), pp. 100–108.
- "Women's Contribution to Theology in Latin America" in Feminist Ethics and the Catholic Moral Tradition. Readings in Moral Theology no. 9, Charles Y. Curran (ed.), Paulist Press, Mahwah, NJ, 1996), pp. 90–119. Extracted from Our Cry for Life, pp. 109–130.
- "Construyendo la Misión Evangelizadora de la Iglesia. Inculturación y Violencia Hacia las Mujeres" ["Constructing the Evangelist Mission of the Church. Inculturation and Violence Toward Women"] in Entre la Indignación y la Esperanza. Teología Feminista Latinoamericana [Between Indignation and Hope. Latin American Feminist Theology], Ana María Tepedino and María Pilar Aquino (eds.) Yendo American Press, Bogotá, Colombia, 1998, pp. 63–91.
- "Teología Feminista Latinoamericana" ["Latin American Feminist Theology"], in Teología Feminista Desde Latinoamericana [Feminist Theology From Latin America], Otto Maduro (ed.) (Guayaquil, Ecuador: Cristianismo y Sociedad, [Christianity and Society] pp. 135–132, 1998), 9-28. Reprinted en "El Siglo de las Mujeres" ["The Century of Women"] in Ediciones de las Mujeres [Women's Editions] Ana María Portugal and Carmen Torres (eds.), Isis Internacional, Santiago, Chile, 1999), pp. 233–251.
- "Latin American Feminist Theology" in Journal of Feminist Studies in Religion, 14/1 (Spring 1998), pp. 89–107.
- "Christianity in Latin America and the Caribbean" in Encyclopedia of Women and' World Religion, Serenity Young (ed.), MacMillan, New York, 1998.
- "La Visión Liberalizadora de Medellín en la Teología Feminista" ["The Liberalizing Vision of Medellín in Feminist Theology"] in Revista Latinoamericana de Teología XV/45 (September–December 1998), pp. 269–275.
- "Theological Method in U.S. Latino/Theology: Toward an Intercultural Theology in the Third Millennium" in From the Heart of Our People: Latino/a Explorations in Catholic Systematic Theology, Orlando L. Espín and Miguel H. Díaz (eds.), Orbis Books, Maryknoll, NY, 1999, pp. 6–48.
- "El Movimiento de Mujeres: Fuente de Esperanza" ["The Women's Movement: Source of Hope"] in 2000 Realidad y Esperanza, [Reality and Hope], Virgilio Elizondo and Jon Sobrino (eds.), Concilium 283 (November, 1999), pp. 123–133.
- "Presupuestos metodológicos de la teología desde la perspectiva de la mujer" ["Methodological assumptions from the Women's Perspective"] and other essays in Teología y Género: Selección de Textos [Theology and Genre: Selection of Texts] Clara Luz Actúo and Marianela de la Paz (eds.), Editorial Caminos, Havana, Cuba, 2003, pp. 143–196, 356-382.
- "La teología feminista: horizontes de Esperanza" ["Feminist Theology: Horizons of Hope"], en Panorama de la teología Latino-americana, [Panorama of Latin American Theology], Juan José Tamayo and Juan Bosch (eds.), (Verbo Divino, Estella, 2002, 2nd ed.), pp. 95–113.
- "Teología Crítica y Dogmatismos Religiosos: Desafíos y Propuestas" ["Critique of Theology and Religious Dogmatism: Challenges and Proposals"] in Teología y Sociedad. Relevancia y Funciones [Theology and Society. Relevance and Responsibilities] Maria Carmelita de Freitas (ed.), Sociedad de Teología y Ciencias de la Religión, São Paulo: Paulinas, 2006, pp. 91–126.
- "Pensamiento Intercultural y Teología Crítica" ["Intercultural Thought and Critical Theology"] in Utopía hat einen Ort. Beiträge für eine interkulturelle Welt aus venga Kontinenten, Raúl Fornet-Betancourt, Elisabeth Steffens and Annette Meuthrath (orgs.), IKO-Verlag für In-terkulturelle Kommunikation, 2006, pp. 57–64.
