= Dorothy Vena Johnson =

American poet (1898–1970)

- Johnson, from a 1942 directory.
- Born: Dorothy Vena; May 7, 1898; Los Angeles, United States
- Died: 1970 (aged 71–72)
- Occupations: Poet, educator
- Years active: 1930s–1960s
- Known for: co-founder of the League of Allied Arts

Dorothy Vena Johnson (May 7, 1898 – 1970) was an American poet and educator based in Los Angeles, California. In 1939, she was co-founder of the League of Allied Arts, an African-American women's arts organization.

== Personal life ==
Dorothy Vena was born in Los Angeles, the daughter of James Vena and his wife Namie (née Plum). He was a postal clerk, an editor, and a founding member of the Los Angeles branch of the NAACP. She earned a bachelor's degree at the University of Southern California and a teaching certificate at the University of California, Los Angeles (UCLA).

She married a lawyer, Ivan Johnson III, before 1932. She died in 1970, after a cerebral hemorrhage.

== Career ==
Johnson was a poet who was influenced by the Harlem Renaissance. Her poems, including "Green Valley", "Palace", "Letter En Route Overseas", "Bread for Sale", "Epitaph for a Bigot", and "Post War Ballad", were included in publications and poetry collections edited by Arna Bontemps and Beatrice M. Murphy. Her works still appear in anthologies of black women's poetry.

Johnson and social worker Juanita Ellsworth Miller (the wife of publisher and judge Loren Miller) worked to promote poet Langston Hughes when he was in Los Angeles, and from that experience they co-founded the League of Allied Arts, an African-American women's arts organization, in 1939. Johnson was the League's president from its founding until the mid-1950s. During her tenure the League began offering scholarships to black artists and writers, and promoted dancers, theatrical presentations, and readings by writers, and supported the Migration Series paintings of Jacob Lawrence. In 1962, Johnson was named "Woman of the Year" by the California Alpha Psi Zeta chapter of Zeta Phi Beta sorority.

Johnson taught journalism to junior high school students in the Los Angeles Unified School District for more than forty years. She was a member of the Los Angeles Creative Writing Teachers Association. She was the principal at Garden Gate High School, retiring in 1963. Among her students was entrepreneur Dolores Ratcliffe, who recalled her as "an outstanding human being and only one of two black teachers at my elementary school. I decided in the third grade that I would be like her".

She was the first black principal of a Los Angeles secondary school.

== Legacy ==
The Dorothy Vera Johnson High School was dedicated in December 1980. It was later known as Johnson Community Day School, a continuation school of grades 7 through 12, situated in an industrial area east of the Harbor Freeway in South Los Angeles. In October 2008 it was moved to a corner of Bernstein High School south of Sunset Boulevard in Hollywood.

The black history collection at the Vernon Branch of the Los Angeles Public Library was named for Johnson in 1971.

The League of Allied Arts is still active in Los Angeles; its papers are archived at UCLA.
