= Benjamin R. Sheldon =

American judge (1811–1897)

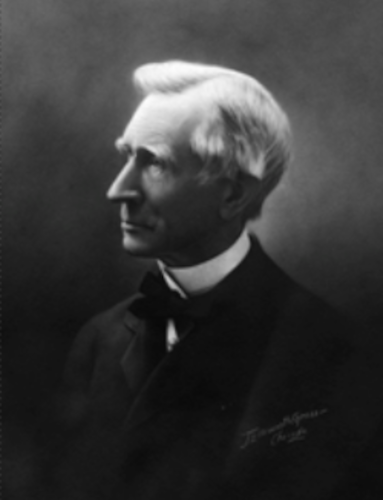
Sheldon's portrait at the Illinois Supreme Court.

Benjamin Robbins Sheldon (April 15, 1811 – April 13, 1897) was an American jurist.

Born in New Marlborough, Massachusetts, Sheldon received his bachelor's degree from Williams College in 1831 and his law degree from Yale Law School in 1836. Sheldon lived in Galena, Illinois, until 1871, when he moved to Rockford, Illinois, to live with his sister. He served as an Illinois circuit court judge from 1848 to 1870. Sheldon then served on the Illinois Supreme Court from 1870 until his retirement in 1885. He was chief justice. Sheldon died at his home in Rockford, Illinois.
