= C. G. W. French =

American jurist and politician (1822–1891)

Chief Justice, Arizona Territorial Supreme Court
- In office February 1, 1876 – May 20, 1884
- Nominated by: Ulysses S. Grant; Rutherford B. Hayes
- Preceded by: Edmund Francis Dunne
- Succeeded by: Sumner Howard

Personal details
- Born: August 22, 1822 Berkley, Massachusetts
- Died: August 13, 1891 (aged 68) San Francisco, California
- Party: Republican
- Spouse(s): Abby Ann Haskell (m. 1853–1879) Nancy LeCroft Manney (m. 1886–1886)
- Education: Brown University
- Profession: Attorney

Charles Grafton Wilberton French (August 22, 1820 – August 13, 1891) was an American jurist and politician. Raised and educated in New England, he moved to California and served a two-year term in the California State Assembly. French followed his time as a legislator with nine years as Chief Justice on the Arizona Territorial Supreme Court.

== Biography ==
French was born on August 22, 1820, in Berkley, Massachusetts. His father, Ephraim French, and grandfather, James French, were both ship captains involved with cargo vessels. He was educated in private academies and by private tutors before graduating from Brown University in 1842. After graduation, he taught in local schools while continuing his study of law. French also apprenticed in the offices of several attorneys, including those of Benjamin R. Curtis. After admission to the Massachusetts bar in 1848, French practiced in Dedham. He married Abby Ann Haskell.

In January 1851, French moved to California. He brought with him letters of recommendation from Daniel Webster and Justice Curtis. He initially practiced law in Placer County, California, before moving to Sacramento, California, in 1854. French served as a trustee of the California State Library from 1866 until 1870 and represented Sacramento in the California State Assembly for a two-year term beginning in 1871. While in the legislature, French was chairman of both the committee on codes and the state library committee.

Based upon a recommendation by the California Congressional delegation, French was nominated to become Chief Justice of Arizona by President Ulysses S. Grant on December 13, 1875, and confirmed by the United States Senate three days later. He took the oath of office on February 1, 1876. He brought his wife and children with him to Arizona Territory. Initially assigned to the first district, French split his time between Tucson and Florence. While serving on the bench, the Chief Justice gained an unusual reputation of rarely leaving his district except when substituting for a colleague in another district. French's wife died from cancer on December 11, 1879, while escorting the couple's children back east to attend college.

As his first four-year term was set to expire, there was universal support in the Arizona press for French's reappointment. President Rutherford B. Hayes responded by nominating him for a second term on December 1, 1879. French desired a transfer to northern Arizona. Justice William Henry Stilwell, who was initially assigned to the northern district upon his appointment, had no objections to a switch so French was transferred to the third district by the 11th Arizona Territorial Legislature. Following the transfer, the Chief Justice made his home in Prescott.

From the time he took the bench until 1883, all surviving supreme court decisions in the Arizona Register were authored by French. The majority of cases from this period deal with procedural issues. Examples include Fleury v. Jackson and Tompkins, 1 Arizona 361 (1887) which denied an appeal because the request was submitted after the allotted time for such action had expired and French's affirmation of the lower court's ruling in Territory v. Selden, 1 Arizona 381 (1879) because the appeal did not include a bill of exceptions. In Cole v. Bean, 1 Arizona 377 (1878), the Chief Justice found that an expert was not needed to testify as to the effects of liquor upon a person. Mining cases also appeared frequently on the docket. Examples include a wrongful death case in Lopez v. Central Arizona Mining Company, 1 Arizona 464 (1883) and Field V. Gray, 1 Arizona 404 (1881) which dealt with a title dispute.

While serving on the bench, French was witness to an infamous instance of courtroom violence. On December 3, 1883, French was hearing a water-rights case when the attorney for the plaintiff, Attorney General Clark Churchill, called the opposing counsel, Charles B. Rush, a liar. Rush responded by throwing an inkwell at Churchill and then attacking him physically. The court reporter, Buckey O'Neill, came to Churchill's aid as a brawl broke out within the courtroom. Defendant Patrick McAteer, who was testifying at the time the fight began, drew a large knife and joined the fray. During the struggle, a shot from a revolver struck the kerosene lamp illuminating the courtroom, extinguishing the room's primary light source. By the time order was restored there were multiple people injured, several with knife wounds. A seventy-year-old man, wounded in the fight had to have his arm amputated. McAteer was struck in the side by a bullet and died from his wound a month later.

As his second term came to an end, there were widespread calls for French's reappointment. There are no records showing why President Chester A. Arthur decided not to return him for a third term. After leaving the bench, he opened a private legal practice in Prescott. In his later years, French was reunited with "the love of his youth". On April 29, 1886, he married Nancy LeCroft Manney. She was seriously ill at the time and died on June 14, 1886. Around 1890, the former Chief Justice moved back to Sacramento. French died in San Francisco on August 13, 1891.
