= Charles Silent =

American jurist and businessman (1842–1918)

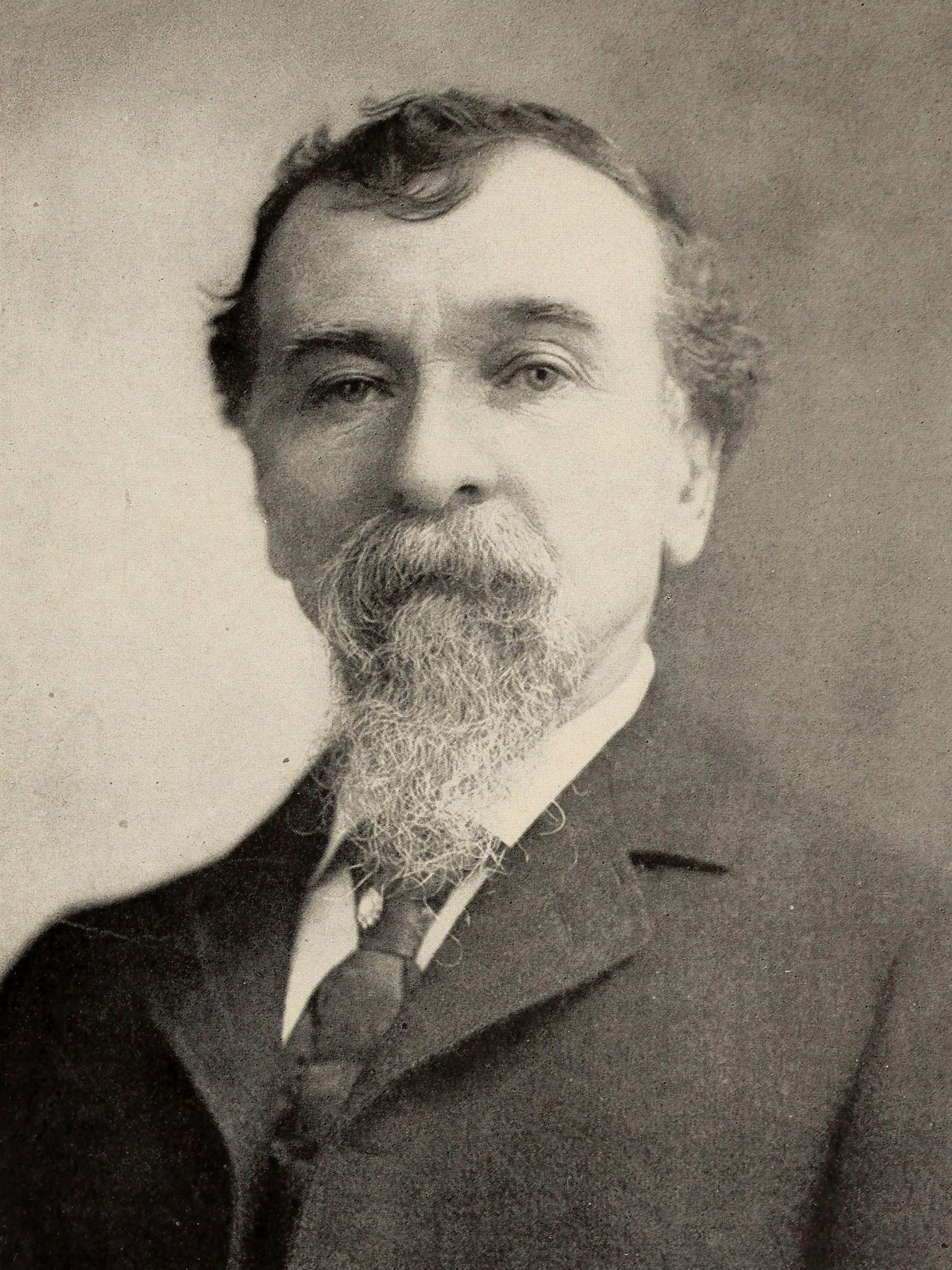

Associate Justice, Arizona Territorial Supreme Court
- In office May 1878 – October 18, 1880
- Nominated by: Rutherford B. Hayes
- Preceded by: Charles Austin Tweed
- Succeeded by: William Henry Stilwell

Personal details
- Born: January 1, 1842 Baden
- Died: December 14, 1918 (aged 76) Glendora, California, U.S.
- Party: Republican
- Spouse(s): Emma Daniel (1864-1870); Mary C. Tantau (1872-)
- Profession: Attorney

Charles Silent (January 1, 1842 (Note: Some sources indicate Silent was born in 1843) – December 14, 1918) was a German-born American jurist who served as an associate justice of the Arizona Territorial Supreme Court. After leaving the bench he entered private practice and became one of Los Angeles' leading attorneys. His interest in horticulture led to his involvement in the Los Angeles parks system.

== Background ==
Silent was born in Baden, Germany, on January 1, 1842. Due to his father's participation in the Revolutions of 1848, his family immigrated to Columbus, Ohio later that year. At the age of twelve, he borrowed some money and left home for New York City. From there he sailed to California, arriving in San Francisco in August 1856.

Silent found work in Drytown, California. Studying during his spare time, he earned a teacher's certificate when he was seventeen years old. He worked several years as a teacher before enrolling at the University of the Pacific in 1862. In 1864, Silent married Emma Daniel of Santa Clara, California. The marriage lasted till her death in 1870 and produced three children: Edward D., Fred C, and Elizabeth W.

Silent left college in 1866 to become Principal of the Santa Clara school district. He continued his studies and began reading law, earning admission to the California bar in 1868 and an honorary Master of Arts from the University of the Pacific in 1872. Silent was married again in 1872 to Mary C. Tantau. This second union produced two children: Florence and Chester.

Upon his admission to the bar, Silent became a partner in the San Jose law firm of Moore, Laine, & Silent. He practiced at the firm for the next decade. Meanwhile, Silent also developed interests in the railroad business, become head of a pair of lines, one running between San Jose and Santa Clara the other between Santa Cruz and Felton.

== Arizona Territory ==
Upon the recommendation of Newton Booth and Aaron A. Sargent, Silent was appointed an associate justice of the Supreme Court of Arizona in February 1878. He arrived in Arizona on May 1, 1878, and began hearing cases on May 17. Shortly after his arrival in Prescott, the judge learned that the practice of law in Arizona was significantly better paying than that of judge. As a result, he decided he should resign. Upon learning of this intention, the 10th Arizona Territorial Legislature raised his annual salary to US$2000 more than his fellow associate justices. The Legislature also sent him with Governor Frémont to lobby in Washington D.C. to have an order by Secretary of the Interior Carl Schurz to extend the boundaries of the Gila River Indian Reservation into the Salt River Valley.

In addition to his duties as a judge, Silent developed a number of business interests in mining. The Arizona Territorial Delegate to Congress John G. Campbell used the existence of these business interests in an attempt to have Judge Silent removed from office. Silent admitted to the interests but claimed they did not interfere with his duties. On June 18, 1880, an investigation by the United States Attorney General found the charges insufficient to justify removal.

Silent resigned as an associate justice on October 18, 1880. He then moved to Tucson where he held a private legal practice for the next three years. In addition to his thriving legal practice, his mining interests prospered and he became quite wealthy. In 1883, Silent's health began to decline and he spent the next two years traveling in an attempt to recover.

== Southern California ==
Silent settled in Los Angeles near the end of 1885. There, as a partner in the legal firm Houghton, Silent, and Campbell, he became "one of the leading attorneys not only of the bar of Los Angeles, but of the state of California". His interest in horticulture led to him accepting membership on the Los Angeles park commission. As a commission member, Silent became key in refurbishment of Pershing Square (Los Angeles). In 1897, as a means of reducing local unemployment in the city, Silent organized a beautification project for the entrance to Elysian Park.

In 1907, Silent's son Chester died in a hunting accident, to which the former judge responded by largely withdrawing from his legal practice and devoting his time to real estate projects. One of these, Chester Place, was named after his son.

Silent died at his Los Alisos Ranch, in Glendora, California, on December 14, 1918. His cremains were placed in a family plot at Los Angeles' Angelus-Rosedale Cemetery.
