= Dorothy E. Johnson =

American nurse, researcher, author and theorist

- Born: Dorothy Elma Johnson; August 21, 1919; Savannah, Georgia
- Died: February 4, 1999 (aged 79); Key Largo, Florida
- Occupations: Nurse, author, theorist
- Known for: Behavioral system model, nursing theorist

Dorothy E. Johnson (August 21, 1919 – February 4, 1999) was an American nurse, researcher, author, and theorist. She is known for creating the behavioral system model and for being one of the founders of modern system-based nursing theory.

== Biography ==
=== Early life ===
She was born on August 21, 1919, in Savannah, Georgia. She was the youngest of seven siblings. Her father Charles-Leroy Johnson (born in 1881), worked in the fishing industry and her mother was Annie Bryce Johnson (born in 1883).

=== Education ===
She graduated at age 17 from Senior High School in Savannah. In 1938, Dorothy got her associate of arts from Armstrong Junior College in Savannah, Georgia. On June 8, 1942, she received her Bachelor of Science in Nursing from Vanderbilt University in Tennessee. Finally, in 1948 she received her Master of public health from Harvard University.

=== Career ===
From January to July 1943, she worked as an instructor of nursing at Vanderbilt University. In this year she also worked briefly as a staff nurse at the Chatham-Savannah Health Council. In 1944, she returned to her academic career at Vanderbilt University School of Nursing, a position that she held until 1948. From 1949 until 1978, she served as assistant, associate, and professor of pediatric nursing at the University of California at Los Angeles. She had an early retirement following an open heart surgery. Finally, she left California to live in Key Largo, Florida.

From 1955 to 1956 she was a pediatric nursing advisor at the Christian Medical College School of Nursing in Vellore, South India. Here, she assisted in the developing of a baccalaureate program of Nursing.

In 1959, she introduced the concept of nursing diagnosis to differentiate the work of nursing from medicine. She distinguished nursing from medicine by noting that nursing views the patient as a behavioral system whereas medicine views the patient as a biological system. For Johnson, it was very important to base knowledge upon research findings as the basis of nursing science.

=== Awards ===
She received the Lulu Hassenplug Award for distinguished achievements conferred by the California Nurses Association.

== Behavioral system ==
In this model first proposed in 1968, nurses see their clients as being more important than their illnesses; a patient is perceived as a group of subsystems that form a complete behavioral system. The subsystems and their respective goals are as follows:

- Achievement: to control self and the environment.
- Affiliative: to achieve intimacy and inclusion.
- Aggressive/Protective: to protect self or others from objects, persons or ideas.
- Dependency: to obtain attention and assistance.
- Eliminative: to expel biological wastes.
- Ingestive: to take in needed resources from the environment.
- Restorative: to replenish energy distribution.
- Sexual: to procreate, to gratify or attract.

== Books ==
- Expanding and Modifying Guidance Programs (1968)
- Barriers and Hazards in Counseling (1970) co-author: Mary J. Vestermark
- To Be a Nurse (1980)
