= Lamber-Goodnow =

Lamber Goodnow Injury Lawyers
- Headquarters: Phoenix, Arizona
- Major practice areas: Personal injury Wrongful death
- Key people: Marc Lamber
- Website: lambergoodnow.com

Lamber Goodnow Injury Lawyers is a legal team known for their work on implementing virtual reality (VR) technology for use in court cases in the United States.

== Virtual reality ==
Lamber Goodnow Injury Lawyers specialize in personal injury and wrongful death claims. The group implements VR in a number of cases to help judges and juries see recreated scenes, such as crash sites. Accident scenes are translated into a 3D experience for Oculus Rift by a group of engineers and legal experts at the production company Kitchen Sink Studios, which reenacts collisions based on police records, victim stories, and witness statements. Lamber-Goodnow use the technology to help jury members understand what happened in a case.

== Other technology ==
Aside from VR, the team has implemented several recent technological advances in a legal context.

They use 3D printers to provide jurors with tangible objects to show issues such as product defects. They implemented the use of Google Glass: to determine which arguments are most compelling with focus groups; and loaning them to clients so they can record a day in their lives post-injury. Instead of traditional demand letters proposing out-of-court settlements, they send iPads pre-loaded with a demand video.

== Practice and offices ==
The Lamber-Goodnow team developed within Fennemore Craig. They have offices in Phoenix, Denver and Chicago.
