= Rayes =

Rayes can refer to:

- Alain Rayes (born 1971), Canadian politician.
- Douglas L. Rayes (born 1952), American district judge.
- Nathalie Rayes (born c. 1975), Venezuelan activist and sociologist.
