= Judge Hardy =

Judge Hardy may refer to:

- Charles Leach Hardy (1919–2010), judge of the United States District Court for the District of Arizona
- Liam P. Hardy (born 1973), judge of the United States Court of Appeals for the Armed Forces
- W. Scott Hardy (born 1971), judge of the United States District Court for the Western District of Pennsylvania
- Judge James K. Hardy, fictional father of the main character in the Andy Hardy film series of the 1930s–1940s
