= Charles Hardy (disambiguation) =

Charles Hardy (c. 1714–1780) was a Royal Navy officer and colonial governor of New York.

Charles Hardy may also refer to:

- Charles Hardy (Royal Navy officer, died 1744) (1680–1744), Royal Navy officer and father of the above
- Charles Hardy (Australian politician) (1898–1941), Australian politician
- Charles Leach Hardy (1919–2010), U.S. federal judge
- Charlie Hardy (1887–1968), Australian rules footballer
- Charles Albert Creery Hardy (1843–1922), New Zealand politician
- Charles Hardy (eater), competitive eater from Brooklyn, New York, USA
