= Ed Hochuli =

American football official and attorney (born 1950)

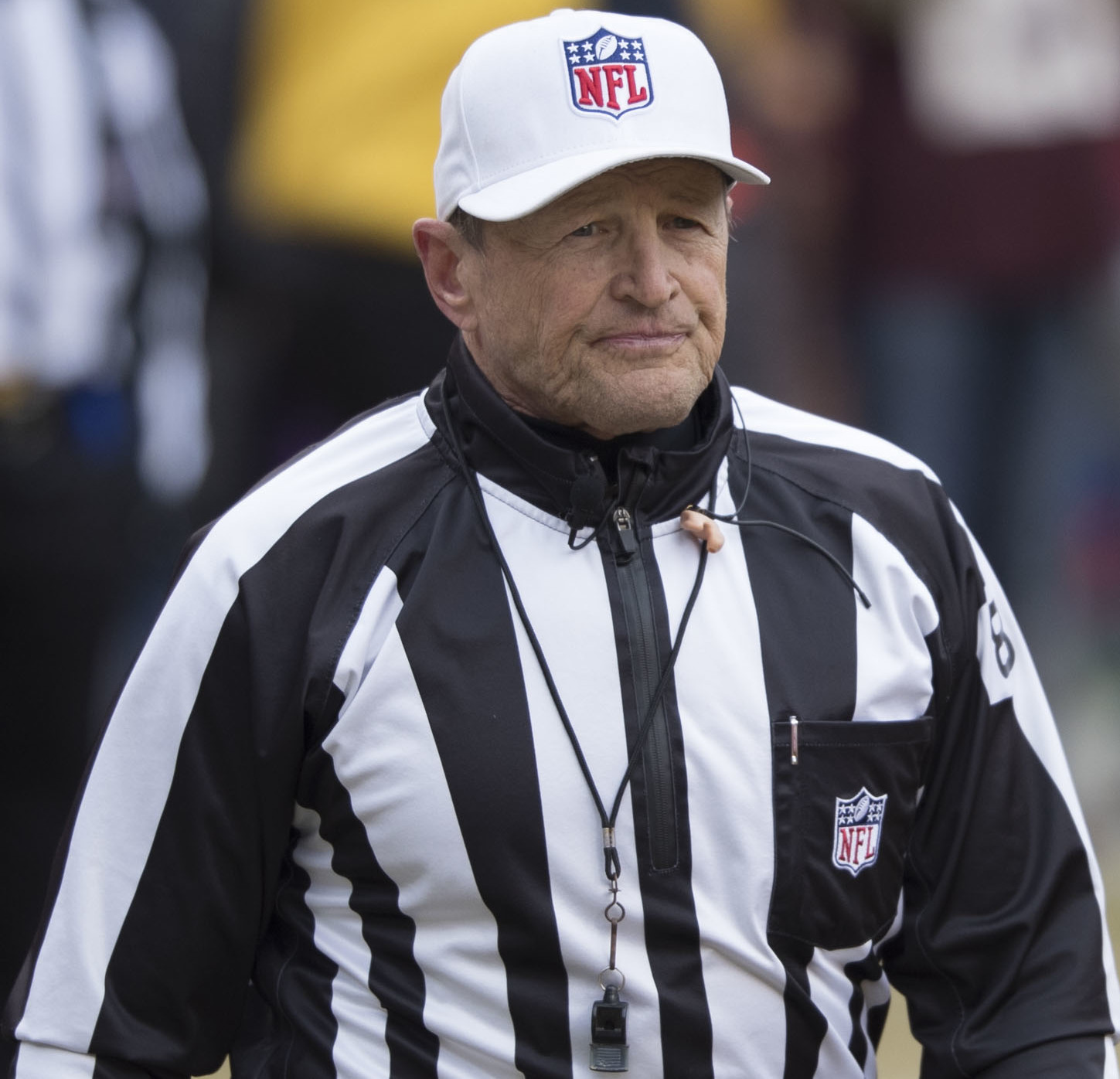
- Hochuli in 2017
- Born: December 25, 1950 (age 75); Milwaukee, Wisconsin, U.S.
- Education: University of Texas at El Paso; University of Arizona Law School
- Occupations: NFL official (1990–2017); Attorney (Jones, Skelton & Hochuli, P.L.C.) (1983–2021)
- Children: 6 (including Shawn Hochuli)
- Website: jshfirm.com/attorneys/ehochuli

Edward G. Hochuli (/ˈhɒkjʊli/ HOCK-yuu-lee; born December 25, 1950) is an American retired attorney and former American football official. He served as an attorney at Jones, Skelton & Hochuli, P.L.C., from 1983 to 2021, and was an official in the National Football League (NFL) from 1990 to 2017; his uniform number was 85. Before becoming a football official, he played college football for four seasons at the University of Texas at El Paso (UTEP).

Hochuli worked numerous playoff games, including two Super Bowls. He is best known for his athletic/muscular physique (height: 6 feet 2 inches (1.88 m); weight: 230 pounds (100 kg)), and for explaining on-field rulings in a manner that is comprehensive yet also clear and concise. In a poll conducted by ESPN in 2008, Hochuli tied fellow referee Mike Carey for "best referee" votes (eight each) among NFL head coaches. In his 28th season in the league and 26th as a referee (crew chief) with the 2017 NFL season, Hochuli's officiating crew consisted of umpire Shawn Smith, down judge Greg Bradley, line judge Rusty Baynes, field judge Dale Shaw, side judge Alex Kemp, and back judge Scott Helverson.

After the retirements of Gerald Austin and Larry Nemmers following the 2007 season, Hochuli became the NFL's longest-tenured referee for the next decade. He announced his own retirement in March 2018. In 2019, his son Shawn Hochuli—previously a referee in the Arena Football League and a back judge in the NFL—was promoted to referee.

== Personal life ==
=== Early life ===
Hochuli was born on December 25, 1950, in Milwaukee, living there until his family moved to Tucson, Arizona, when he was eight. He was the second child of six. He went to Canyon del Oro High School in the Tucson suburb of Oro Valley, Arizona, graduating in 1969. During his high school years, he participated in football (earning all-state honors twice), basketball, wrestling, and track. He attributes his competitive nature to having an older brother, Chip Hochuli. Ed Hochuli told Referee in a 2004 interview, "I was somebody who wanted to be good and I wanted my brother to be proud of me, and I wanted my parents to be proud of me." He earned a Bachelor of Arts degree with honors from the University of Texas at El Paso in 1972. While studying at UTEP, Hochuli played linebacker on the school's football team from 1969 to 1972. As a football player he earned All–Western Athletic Conference academic honors in 1972. His father, Walter Hochuli, was involved with law as a wills and estate planner, which influenced Ed Hochuli to pursue a career in law. He earned his Juris Doctor from the University of Arizona Law School in 1976. While in law school, Hochuli served as a law clerk for two years under United States District Judge Carl Muecke. After completing his education Hochuli was admitted to the State Bar of Arizona.

=== Family ===
Hochuli resides in the Phoenix metropolitan area. He has six children and 10 grandchildren. Shawn Hochuli is one of his sons and played college football at Pitzer College. Shawn joined his father's profession as an official, working as a side judge in his first NFL season in 2014. Shawn Hochuli also worked in Arena Football League and arenafootball2 games. On August 13, 2011, a day after his father refereed a preseason game between the New England Patriots and Jacksonville Jaguars, Shawn was the head referee for ArenaBowl XXIV between the Jacksonville Sharks and Arizona Rattlers. Scott Hochuli, another of Ed Hochuli's sons, owns Hochuli Design & Remodeling Team which is a company in the Phoenix area that specializes in residential design and construction. He is married to Lorrie Hochuli and they have two daughters: Devan and Ryann. Ed Hochuli's brother, Daniel Hochuli, is the town attorney for Sahuarita, Arizona, and his brother Peter is a judge at the Pima County Juvenile Court in Tucson.

=== Attorney ===
Hochuli was a trial lawyer and a partner in the Arizona law firm of Jones, Skelton and Hochuli, P.L.C., having been a part of the firm since it was founded in 1983 to his retirement. The firm began with five partners and seven associates and has expanded to over 80 attorneys. He specializes in civil litigation in the areas of bad faith and extra-contractual liability, complex litigation, insurance coverage and fraud, legal malpractice and professional liability, product liability defense, trucking and transportation industry defense, and wrongful death and personal injury defense. He claims to be involved in 200 cases at any time. Hochuli finds interest in trying cases, calling it an "adrenaline rush" adding, "You love that challenge–the competition, if you will–of it. It's a game. It's obviously a very important game to people, and I don't mean to diminish the importance of it... You have to follow these rules, and there's a win-or-lose outcome. You're on a stage."

He is admitted to practice in Arizona state and federal courts and the United States Court of Appeals for the Ninth Circuit. His recognition as an attorney includes being named Best Lawyers in America since 2003 and Southwest Super Lawyers in 2007. Super Lawyers includes only the top five percent of lawyers in a state based on point totals, as chosen by peers and through independent research by Law & Politics.

Comparing his law and officiating professions, he says "A trial is nothing, pressure-wise, compared to the NFL… I have that long [snaps his fingers] to make a decision with a million people watching and second-guessing (by video) in slow-motion. You've got to be right or wrong. I love the satisfaction when you are right — and the agony when you are wrong." He finds similarities between the football field and courtroom saying, "On the football field, people like that I'm in charge and know what I'm doing, but a lot of the time, it's just appearance. I'm going to sell you on my decision. It's the same in the courtroom. You don't stand in front of a jury and say, 'I think my client is innocent.' You say, 'We're right!'"

== Officiating career ==
=== Early years ===
Hochuli began officiating Pop Warner football games as a law student to earn additional income, which was suggested by one of his former high school coaches as "a way to stay in touch with the game". His interest in officiating carried over into baseball where he was a Little League Baseball umpire from 1970 to 1973. Progressing to the high school level in 1973, he focused on football, and officiated games in the Tucson area until 1985. In addition to high school officiating, he worked college football games for the Big Sky Conference and Pacific-10 Conference as a line judge during the 1980s.

=== NFL career ===
Hochuli was hired by the NFL in 1990 as a back judge after applying to the league before the 1989 NFL season. His first game in the league was on August 11, 1990, at Lambeau Field in Green Bay, Wisconsin. During his first two years in the league, he was assigned to the officiating crew headed by referee Howard Roe. To gain additional experience as a back judge and eventually a referee, Hochuli participated in the NFL's partnership with the World League of American Football (WLAF), a spring developmental league, in 1991 and 1992. Using his experience in the WLAF, as well as the organization, precision, and analytical skills he learned while working under Roe's guidance, Hochuli desired to become a crew chief in the NFL. He was promoted to referee in 1992 when longtime referee Stan Kemp was diagnosed with Lou Gehrig's disease and forced to retire. Hochuli had worked a preseason game that year in Tokyo, Japan, as a back judge when he received a telephone call following the game from then–Senior Director of Officiating, Jerry Seeman. Seeman asked Hochuli to work as referee for the first time when the Denver Broncos hosted the Cincinnati Bengals in a preseason game.

Since becoming a referee, Hochuli headed the officiating crews for Super Bowl XXXII and Super Bowl XXXVIII, and he was selected as an alternate for Super Bowl XXXI, Super Bowl XXXVII, and Super Bowl XXXIX. In addition to working two Super Bowls, he has officiated five conference championship games as of the start of the 2007 NFL season. Every officiating game performance is graded by the league each week. These grades determine which officials are assigned playoff games, as well as the Super Bowl. Hochuli credits his mentor, Jerry Markbreit, a four-time Super Bowl referee, as the greatest influence on his career.

In his second year as referee, he worked the 1993 Thanksgiving Day game between the Dallas Cowboys and Miami Dolphins in Irving, Texas. During the final moments of the game, Miami placekicker Pete Stoyanovich had a field goal attempt blocked. The Cowboys' Leon Lett inadvertently touched the loose ball before the Dolphins' Jeff Dellenbach pounced on it. At the time, Hochuli had "no idea" what happened during the play and had to confer with three other officials to piece together the sequence of events. With the information gathered from the officials, he ruled that Miami retained possession of the football. Stoyanovich booted the ensuing winning field goal for the Miami win.

Hochuli was a referee for the 1999 AFC divisional playoff game between the Miami Dolphins and Jacksonville Jaguars; it was the final game for quarterback Dan Marino and coach Jimmy Johnson as the Jaguars won 62–7.

Hochuli was a referee in the 2003 divisional playoff game between the Packers and the Eagles.

On October 2, 2005, he officiated the first regular-season NFL game played outside the United States when the Arizona Cardinals played the San Francisco 49ers in Mexico City, Mexico, as part of the league's "Fútbol Americano" marketing campaign. On the first penalty announcement of the game, Hochuli gave the explanation in Spanish to pay respect to the host city and country. His son, Shawn Hochuli, made a similar move in 2024 when officiating a game between the Carolina Panthers and New York Giants in Munich, Germany, where he announced the first penalty of the game in German.

Jeff Bergman joined Hochuli for the wild card bout between the San Diego Chargers and New York Jets on January 8, 2005.

Hochuli officiated the first regular season game at University of Phoenix Stadium on September 10, 2006, when the Cardinals hosted the 49ers.

He was the referee for the game between the Detroit Lions and Green Bay Packers, played December 17, 2006, that included Green Bay quarterback Brett Favre becoming the all-time leader for pass completions among quarterbacks in the NFL. Favre was unaware that his 4,968 pass completions were a record until he was informed during the game by Hochuli. Hochuli was the referee again for another Favre record-breaking moment when Favre threw his 421st touchdown pass of his career on September 30, 2007, at the Hubert H. Humphrey Metrodome in Minneapolis, Minnesota, to break the record previously held by Dan Marino. He also reffed the Week 17 game in 2008 in which the Lions became the first of two NFL teams so far to go 0–16 in a season, with the other being the 2017 Browns.

One of Hochuli's notable explanations came during a 2007 regular season game between the San Diego Chargers and New England Patriots. While nullifying a holding infraction, he announced through his microphone, "There was no foul on the play. It was not a hold. The defender was just overpowered."

On September 14, 2008, Hochuli officiated a game between the San Diego Chargers and the Denver Broncos. He made an incorrect call with 1:17 left in the game, while Denver was in possession of the ball at the San Diego one-yard line and they were trailing the Chargers by seven points. On a second-down play, Denver quarterback Jay Cutler fumbled the ball, and it was recovered by San Diego linebacker Tim Dobbins. Ed Hochuli blew his whistle during the play, signaling that the play was dead and ruling an incomplete pass. Hochuli later wrote, "Affecting the outcome of a game is a devastating feeling. Officials strive for perfection – I failed miserably." The NFL passed a rule the following offseason allowing such plays to be reviewable under the instant replay rule for the 2009 NFL season. Speaking to Referee in November 2009, Hochuli told the magazine, "It was really an easy play. I’ve thought many times why I did what I did. The best explanation is it was almost like dyslexia. I realized it was a fumble and did the wrong thing. I realized I was wrong but there was nothing I could do about it."

==== 2001 officials' strike ====
Hochuli has served as the head of the NFL Referees Association (NFLRA), the union which represents NFL game officials. The union was responsible for negotiating a new contract for the officials prior to the 2001 NFL season. At the time, salaries ranged from a first-year official earning US$1,431 a game to a veteran official with twenty years of experience making $4,330 a game. Officials were looking for a 400 percent increase in salary while the league was offering just 40 percent. During the negotiations Hochuli believed the issue in finding a resolution was to convince the league that officials are full-time employees.

At the start of the season, officials had rejected a league offer of a 60 percent immediate increase in salary, followed by an 85 percent salary increase in 2002, and a 100 percent increase in 2003. For the first time in league history, replacement officials were used during the regular season. Hochuli had distributed an e-mail to 1,200 potential replacement officials warning them that "Working as a scab will actually hurt and likely kill any chances you would have of ever getting into the NFL." He later regretted sending the letter to college football officials across the United States. The stalemate between the union and the league ended on September 19, 2001, when officials agreed to a six-year deal from the league with an immediate increase in salary of 50 percent with a raise each year. Officials had been locked out since the final week of pre-season games that year and returned to work on September 23, 2001, when the league resumed games following the September 11, 2001, attacks.

== Celebrity ==
Hochuli's presence on the football field created a cult following. His rise in popularity is believed to have been started by Phil Simms, a former NFL quarterback and then color commentator for the NFL on CBS, who made reference to the size of Hochuli's arms during a telecast. There are internet websites that sell Hochuli merchandise as well as blogs with his namesake. He is often affectionately referred to as "Hochules", a portmanteau of his last name and "Hercules", in homage to his large biceps. While he is aware of his celebrity status, Hochuli does not understand it. He said in a USA Today interview, "I get a kick out of the notoriety, because I'm just a referee. I'm not the players. The players are the game. They're what this is all about. I get notoriety because I explain things, and I get notoriety because I have a decent physique, which is funny because I'm a shrimp, a peewee compared to those players. Neither one of those things has anything to do with whether I'm a good referee."

His recognition extends to the streets, in airports, and in the courtroom. He has been approached by notable athletes such as former National Basketball Association (NBA) player Charles Barkley at the airport. "It never ceases to amaze me," Hochuli told the Arizona Daily Star. "The number of people that will just come up to me and recognize me." He appreciates the attention, saying, "I enjoy the fact that there are people who like me as a referee. I hear from a lot of people and I enjoy that. Like anybody, I like praise. Probably because of my personality, I thrive on that more than other people."

Hochuli's career as an NFL official has been chronicled on the NFL Network's Six Days to Sunday in 2005. The half-hour television program detailed the game preparations that Hochuli went through from Monday to Saturday during the season. The preparation work includes fifteen hours of video tape game review, a "couple hours" completing administrative tasks for the NFL, reading the rulebook, taking a weekly written exam on rules, and communicating with league supervisors.

Hochuli's celebrity status off the field includes being mentioned on the "Top Ten List" during the edition of January 29, 2002, of the Late Show with David Letterman. His likeness appears in the Madden NFL video game franchise beginning with Madden NFL 06. He appeared on the cover of the October 8, 2012, issue of Sports Illustrated. In 2015, he became the subject of "Fallacy Ref", a series of Internet memes about logical fallacies.
