= Walter Early Craig =

American judge

Senior Judge of the United States District Court for the District of Arizona
- In office October 1, 1979 – June 29, 1986

Chief Judge of the United States District Court for the District of Arizona
- In office 1973–1979
- Preceded by: James Augustine Walsh
- Succeeded by: Charles Andrew Muecke

Judge of the United States District Court for the District of Arizona
- In office October 2, 1963 – October 1, 1979
- Appointed by: John F. Kennedy
- Preceded by: Arthur Marshall Davis
- Succeeded by: Charles Leach Hardy

Personal details
- Born: Walter Early Craig; May 26, 1909 Oakland, California, U.S.
- Died: June 29, 1986 (aged 77) Phoenix, Arizona, U.S.
- Education: Stanford University (B.A.); Stanford Law School (LL.B.)

Walter Early Craig (May 26, 1909 – June 29, 1986) was a United States district judge of the United States District Court for the District of Arizona.

== Education and career ==
Born in Oakland, California, Craig received a Bachelor of Arts degree from Stanford University in 1931 and a Juris Doctor from Stanford Law School in 1934. He was a lawyer for the Home Owners' Loan Corporation in San Francisco, California from 1934 to 1936, and was in private practice in Phoenix, Arizona from 1936 to 1964 as a partner at the law firm Fennemore Craig. His time in the private practice of law was interrupted by service in the United States Navy during World War II.

While in private practice Craig served as president of the State Bar of Arizona during 1951-1952. He also was president of the American Bar Association.

== Federal judicial service ==
On August 26, 1963, Craig was nominated by President John F. Kennedy to a seat on the United States District Court for the District of Arizona vacated by Judge Arthur Marshall Davis. Craig was confirmed by the United States Senate on September 25, 1963, and received his commission on October 2, 1963. He served as Chief Judge from 1973 to 1979. He assumed senior status on October 1, 1979. He served as a Judge of the Temporary Emergency Court of Appeals from 1982 to 1986. Craig remained in senior status until his death on June 29, 1986, in Phoenix.

== Sources ==
Legal offices
Preceded by Arthur Marshall Davis	Judge of the United States District Court for the District of Arizona; 1963–1979	Succeeded by Charles Leach Hardy
Preceded by James Augustine Walsh	Chief Judge of the United States District Court for the District of Arizona; 1973–1979	Succeeded by Charles Andrew Muecke
