= Steven Paul Logan =

American judge (born 1965)

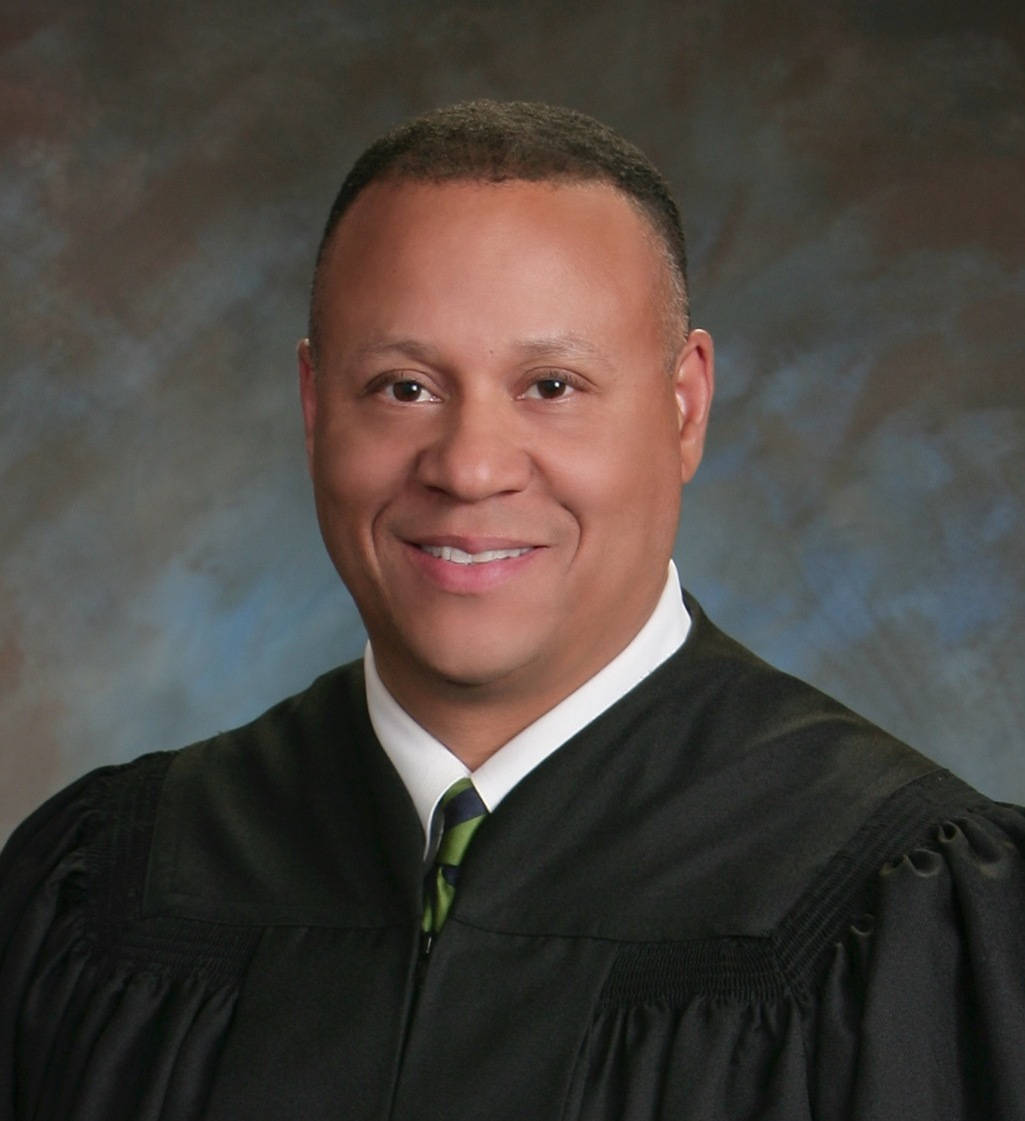

Judge of the United States District Court for the District of Arizona
- Incumbent
- Assumed office May 16, 2014
- Appointed by: Barack Obama
- Preceded by: James A. Teilborg

Magistrate Judge of the United States District Court for the District of Arizona
- In office 2012–2014

Personal details
- Born: December 23, 1965 (age 60) Tacoma, Washington, U.S.
- Education: University of Louisville (BS); University of Oklahoma (JD); National University (MA)

Military service
- Allegiance: United States
- Branch/service: United States Marine Corps
- Years of service: 1989–2016
- Rank: Colonel
- Battles/wars: Operation Iraqi Freedom; Operation Enduring Freedom
- Awards: Bronze Star Medal; Combat Action Ribbon

Steven Paul Logan (born December 23, 1965) is an American lawyer and judge serving as a United States district judge of the United States District Court for the District of Arizona. He is a former United States magistrate judge of the same court.

== Education and military service ==
Judge Logan is a 26-year veteran of the United States Marine Corps, retired with the rank of colonel. He served on the Navy-Marine Corps Court of Criminal Appeals and served during two deployments in Iraq and one deployment in Afghanistan. He also spent six years as a military trial judge. He was awarded the Bronze Star Medal and the Combat Action Ribbon for his second tour of duty in Iraq. Judge Logan received his B.S. from the University of Louisville in 1988 and his J.D. in 1992 from the University of Oklahoma College of Law.

== Career ==
From 1999 to 2010, Logan served as an assistant United States attorney with the United States Department of Justice. As a Federal Prosecutor, he was a member of the Organized Crime Drug Enforcement Task Force (OCDETF) unit. He was responsible for prosecuting national and international drug trafficking and racketeering organizations. From 2010 to 2012, he served as a United States immigration judge in the District of Arizona. From January 2012 until May 16, 2014, he served as a United States magistrate judge in the District of Arizona.

=== Federal judicial service ===
On September 19, 2013, President Barack Obama nominated Logan to serve as a United States district judge of the United States District Court for the District of Arizona. Logan was nominated by President Obama after consultation with Republican Senators John McCain and Jeff Flake. On January 27, 2014, Logan appeared in Washington, D.C. before the United States Senate for his confirmation hearing. On February 27, 2014, his nomination was reported out of the committee by voice vote. On May 12, 2014, Senate Majority Leader Harry Reid filed for cloture on the nomination. On Wednesday May 14, 2014 the Senate voted on the motion to invoke cloture by a 58–37 vote. Later that day, the United States Senate confirmed his nomination by a 96–0 vote. Logan received his judicial commission on May 16, 2014.

== See also ==
- List of African-American federal judges
- List of African-American jurists

Legal offices
Preceded by James A. Teilborg	Judge of the United States District Court for the District of Arizona; 2014–present	Incumbent
