= Rosemary Márquez =

American judge (born 1968)

Judge of the United States District Court for the District of Arizona
- Incumbent
- Assumed office May 19, 2014
- Appointed by: Barack Obama
- Preceded by: Frank R. Zapata

Personal details
- Born: February 28, 1968 (age 58) Los Angeles, California, U.S.
- Education: University of Arizona (BA, JD)

Rosemary Márquez (born February 28, 1968) is a United States district judge of the United States District Court for the District of Arizona.

== Early life and education ==
Márquez's parents, Miguel and Catalina Márquez, emigrated from Sonora, Mexico. Márquez was born in Los Angeles, California in 1968, but her family later moved to Bisbee, Arizona in order to be closer to Sonora. She earned a Bachelor of Arts degree in 1990 from the University of Arizona and a Juris Doctor from the University of Arizona College of Law in 1993.

== Career ==
From 1994 until 1996, Márquez served as a public defender in Pima County, Arizona. From 1996 until 2000, she served as an assistant federal public defender. From 2000 to 2014, Márquez worked in private law practice in Tucson, Arizona, focusing her efforts on federal criminal defense.

=== Federal judicial service ===
During the 111th United States Congress, Democrats from the Arizona House delegation recommended Márquez to fill the vacancy on the United States District Court for the District of Arizona created by Judge Frank R. Zapata's decision to assume senior status. On June 23, 2011, during the 112th Congress, President Obama formally nominated Márquez to serve as a judge for the District of Arizona. Due to opposition by Arizona Senators John McCain and Jon Kyl, both Republicans, her nomination did not receive a hearing in the 112th Congress. On January 2, 2013, her nomination was returned to the President, due to the sine die adjournment of the Senate. On January 3, 2013, she was renominated. On September 19, 2013, Senator McCain indicated that he would support the nomination of Márquez, as well as four other nominees made to the United States District Court for the District of Arizona on that day. Her hearing was before the Senate Judiciary Committee on January 28, 2014. On February 27, 2014, her nomination was reported out of committee by a 15–2 vote. On May 13, 2014, Senate Majority Leader Harry Reid filed for cloture on her nomination. On May 15, 2014, the United States Senate invoked cloture on her nomination by a 58–35 vote. Later that same day, her nomination was confirmed by an 81–15 vote. She received her judicial commission on May 19, 2014.

=== Notable cases ===
In an August 30, 2021 ruling, Marquez threw out a Trump-era rule that permitted the draining and filling of streams, marshes, and wetlands, finding that leaving it in place would lead to "serious environmental harm".

== See also ==
- Barack Obama judicial appointment controversies
- List of Hispanic and Latino American jurists

Legal offices
Preceded by Frank R. Zapata	Judge of the United States District Court for the District of Arizona; 2014–present	Incumbent
