= United States District Court for the District of Arizona =

U.S. federal district court in Arizona

- (D. Ariz.)
- Location: Sandra Day O'Connor United States Courthouse (Phoenix) More locations: Evo A. DeConcini U.S. Courthouse (Tucson); John M. Roll U.S. Courthouse (Yuma); AWD Building (Flagstaff); CVB Only Court (Grand Canyon); U.S. District Court - Kingman - CVB Matters Only (Kingman); U.S. District Court - Page - CVB Matters Only (Page); Globe; Prescott
- Appeals to: Ninth Circuit
- Established: February 14, 1912
- Judges: 13
- Chief Judge: Jennifer Zipps

Officers of the court
- U.S. Attorney: Timothy Courchaine
- U.S. Marshal: Van Bayless (acting)
- www.azd.uscourts.gov

The United States District Court for the District of Arizona (in case citations, D. Ariz.) is the U.S. district court that covers the state of Arizona. It is under the United States Court of Appeals for the Ninth Circuit.

The District was established on June 20, 1910, pending Arizona statehood on February 14, 1912.

The United States Attorney's Office for the District of Arizona represents the United States in civil and criminal litigation in the court. As of February 17, 2025, the United States attorney is Timothy Courchaine.

== Organization of the court ==
Map of the United States District Court for the District of Arizona with its subdivisions: Prescott Division Phoenix Division Tucson Division

The United States District Court for the District of Arizona is the sole federal judicial district in Arizona. Court for the District is held at Phoenix, Tucson, Yuma and Flagstaff. Magistrate courts, established to hear violations on federal lands, are additionally located in Grand Canyon National Park, Kingman, and Page.

The District is further divided into three divisions, with each of these having a central office. The divisions are as follows:

- Phoenix Division
  - This division comprises the following counties: Gila, La Paz, Maricopa, Pinal, and Yuma. Its offices are located in Phoenix, Arizona.
- Prescott Division
  - This division comprises the following counties: Apache, Coconino, Mohave, Navajo, and Yavapai. Its offices are located in Phoenix, Arizona.
- Tucson Division
  - This division comprises the following counties: Cochise, Graham, Greenlee, Pima, and Santa Cruz. Its offices are located in Tucson, Arizona.

== Active judges ==
As of May 26, 2026:

#	Title	Judge	Duty station	Born	Term of service			Appointed by
#	Title	Judge	Duty station	Born	Active	Chief	Senior	Appointed by
37	Chief Judge	Jennifer Zipps	Tucson	1964	2011–present	2024–present	—	Obama
38	District Judge	John J. Tuchi	Phoenix	1964	2014–present	—	—	Obama
39	District Judge	Diane Humetewa	Phoenix	1964	2014–present	—	—	Obama
40	District Judge	Steven Paul Logan	Phoenix	1965	2014–present	—	—	Obama
41	District Judge	Rosemary Márquez	Tucson	1968	2014–present	—	—	Obama
44	District Judge	Dominic W. Lanza	Phoenix	1976	2018–present	—	—	Trump
45	District Judge	Susan Brnovich	Phoenix	1968	2018–present	—	—	Trump
46	District Judge	Michael T. Liburdi	Phoenix	1977	2019–present	—	—	Trump
47	District Judge	Scott H. Rash	Tucson	1963	2020–present	—	—	Trump
48	District Judge	John C. Hinderaker	Tucson	1968	2020–present	—	—	Trump
49	District Judge	Krissa M. Lanham	Phoenix	1980	2024–present	—	—	Biden
50	District Judge	Angela M. Martinez	Tucson	1972	2024–present	—	—	Biden
51	District Judge	Sharad H. Desai	Phoenix	1981	2025–present	—	—	Biden
23	Senior Judge	Stephen M. McNamee	Phoenix	1942	1990–2007	1999–2006	2007–present	G.H.W. Bush
25	Senior Judge	Roslyn O. Silver	Phoenix	1946	1994–2013	2011–2013	2013–present	Clinton
26	Senior Judge	Frank R. Zapata	Tucson	1944	1996–2010	—	2010–present	Clinton
27	Senior Judge	Raner Collins	Tucson	1952	1998–2019	2013–2018	2019–present	Clinton
28	Senior Judge	Susan R. Bolton	Phoenix	1951	2000–2016	—	2016–present	Clinton
30	Senior Judge	James A. Teilborg	Phoenix	1942	2000–2013	—	2013–present	Clinton
31	Senior Judge	Frederick J. Martone	Phoenix	1943	2001–2013	—	2013–present	G.W. Bush
32	Senior Judge	Cindy K. Jorgenson	Tucson	1953	2002–2018	—	2018–present	G.W. Bush
33	Senior Judge	David C. Bury	Tucson	1942	2002–2012	—	2012–present	G.W. Bush
34	Senior Judge	David G. Campbell	Phoenix	1952	2003–2018	—	2018–present	G.W. Bush
36	Senior Judge	G. Murray Snow	Phoenix	1959	2008–2024	2018–2024	2024–present	G.W. Bush
42	Senior Judge	Douglas L. Rayes	Phoenix	1952	2014–2024	—	2024–present	Obama
43	Senior Judge	James A. Soto	Tucson	1950	2014–2024	—	2024–present	Obama

== Former judges ==
#	Judge	Born–died	Active service	Chief Judge	Senior status	Appointed by	Reason for termination
1	Richard Elihu Sloan	1857–1933	1912–1913 (Note: Recess appointment; the United States Senate later rejected the appointment.)	—	—	Taft	not confirmed
2	William Henry Sawtelle	1868–1934	1913–1931	—	—	Wilson	elevation
3	Fred Clinton Jacobs	1865–1958	1923–1936	—	1936–1958	Harding	death
4	Albert Morris Sames	1873–1958	1931–1946	—	1946–1958	Hoover	death
5	David W. Ling	1890–1965	1936–1964	—	1964–1965	F. Roosevelt	death
6	Howard C. Speakman	1892–1952	1946–1952	—	—	Truman	death
7	James Augustine Walsh	1906–1991	1952–1976	1961–1972	1976–1991	Truman	death
8	Arthur Marshall Davis	1907–1963	1961–1963	—	—	Kennedy	death
9	Walter Early Craig	1909–1986	1963–1979	1973–1979	1979–1986	Kennedy	death
10	Charles Andrew Muecke	1918–2007	1964–1984	1979–1984	1984–2007	L. Johnson	death
11	William Perry Copple	1916–2000	1966–1983	—	1983–2000	L. Johnson	death
12	William C. Frey	1919–1979	1970–1979	—	—	Nixon	death
13	Mary Anne Richey	1917–1983	1976–1983	—	—	Ford	death
14	Valdemar Aguirre Cordova	1922–1988	1979–1988	—	—	Carter	death
15	Richard Bilby	1931–1998	1979–1996	1984–1990	1996–1998	Carter	death
16	Charles Leach Hardy	1919–2010	1980–1990	—	1990–2010	Carter	death
17	Earl H. Carroll	1925–2017	1980–1994	—	1994–2017	Carter	death
18	Alfredo Chavez Marquez	1922–2014	1980–1991	—	1991–2014	Carter	death
19	William Docker Browning	1931–2008	1984–1998	1990–1994	1998–2008	Reagan	death
20	Paul Gerhardt Rosenblatt	1928–2019	1984–2003	—	2003–2019	Reagan	death
21	Robert C. Broomfield	1933–2014	1985–1999	1994–1999	1999–2014	Reagan	death
22	Roger Gordon Strand	1934–2017	1985–2000	—	2000–2017	Reagan	death
24	John Roll	1947–2011	1991–2011	2006–2011	—	G.H.W. Bush	death
29	Mary H. Murguia	1960–present	2000–2011	—	—	Clinton	elevation
35	Neil V. Wake	1948–2026	2004–2016	—	2016–2026	G.W. Bush	death

== Chief judges ==
Chief judges have administrative responsibilities with respect to their district court. Unlike the Supreme Court, where one justice is specifically nominated to be chief, the office of chief judge rotates among the district court judges. To be chief, a judge must have been in active service on the court for at least one year, be under the age of 65, and have not previously served as chief judge.

A vacancy is filled by the judge highest in seniority among the group of qualified judges. The chief judge serves for a term of seven years, or until age 70, whichever occurs first. The age restrictions are waived if no members of the court would otherwise be qualified for the position.

When the office was created in 1948, the chief judge was the longest-serving judge who had not elected to retire, on what has since 1958 been known as senior status, or declined to serve as chief judge. After August 6, 1959, judges could not become or remain chief after turning 70 years old. The current rules have been in operation since October 1, 1982.

== Succession of seats ==
Seat 1
Seat established on February 14, 1912 by 36 Stat. 557
Sloan	1912–1913
Sawtelle	1913–1931
Sames	1931–1946
Speakman	1946–1952
Walsh	1952–1976
Richey	1976–1983
Browning	1984–1998
Collins	1998–2019
Hinderaker	2020–present

Seat 2
Seat established on September 14, 1922 by 42 Stat. 837 (temporary)
Seat made permanent on August 19, 1935 by 49 Stat. 659
Jacobs	1923–1936
Ling	1936–1964
Muecke	1964–1984
Strand	1985–2000
Martone	2001–2013
Rayes	2014–2024
Lanham	2024–present

Seat 3
Seat established on May 19, 1961 by 75 Stat. 80
Davis	1961–1963
Craig	1963–1979
Hardy	1980–1990
McNamee	1990–2007
Snow	2008–2024
Desai	2025–present

Seat 4
Seat established on March 18, 1966 by 80 Stat. 75
Copple	1966–1983
Rosenblatt	1984–2003
Wake	2004–2016
Brnovich	2018–present

Seat 5
Seat established on June 2, 1970 by 84 Stat. 294
Frey	1970–1979
Bilby	1979–1996
Zapata	1996–2010
Márquez	2014–present

Seat 6
Seat established on October 20, 1978 by 92 Stat. 1629
Cordova	1979–1988
Seat abolished on June 18, 1988 (temporary judgeship expired)

Seat 7
Seat established on October 20, 1978 by 92 Stat. 1629
Carroll	1980–1994
Silver	1994–2013
Tuchi	2014–present

Seat 8
Seat established on October 20, 1978 by 92 Stat. 1629
Marquez	1980–1991
Roll	1991–2011
Zipps	2011–present

Seat 9
Seat established on April 20, 1984 pursuant to 71 Stat. 586 (temporary)
Seat became permanent upon the abolition of Seat 6 on June 18, 1988
Broomfield	1985–1999
Bolton	2000–2016
Lanza	2018–present

Seat 10
Seat established on November 29, 1999 by 113 Stat. 1501
Teilborg	2000–2013
Logan	2014–present

Seat 11
Seat established on November 29, 1999 by 113 Stat. 1501
Murguia	2000–2011
Humetewa	2014–present

Seat 12
Seat established on November 29, 1999 by 113 Stat. 1501
Jorgenson	2002–2018
Rash	2020–present

Seat 13
Seat established on December 21, 2000 by 114 Stat. 2762
Bury	2002–2012
Soto	2014–2024
Martinez	2024–present

Seat 14
Seat established on November 2, 2002 by 116 Stat. 1758 (temporary)
Campbell	2003–2018
Seat made permanent on December 23, 2024 by 138 Stat. 2693
Liburdi	2019–present

== U.S. attorneys ==
- John Titus 1863
- Almon Gage 1863-64
- C. W. C. Powell 1869
- E. B. Pomroy 1876-82
- James A. Zabriskie 1882-85
- Owen T. Rouse 1885-89
- Harry R. Jeffords 1889-91
- Thomas F. Wilson 1891-93
- Everett E. Ellinwood 1893-98
- Robert E. Morrison 1898-1902
- Frederick S. Nave 1902-05
- Joseph L. B. Alexander 1905-10
- Joseph E. Morrison 1910-14
- Thomas A. Flynn 1914-22
- Frederick H. Bernard 1922-25
- John B. Wright 1925-29
- John C. Gung'l 1929-33
- Clifton Mathews 1933-35
- Frank E. Flynn 1935-53
- Edward W. Scruggs 1953
- Jack D. H. Hays 1953-60
- Charles A. Muecke 1960
- Mary Anne Reimann 1960-61
- Charles A. Muecke 1961-64
- Jo Ann D. Diamos 1964-65
- William P. Copple 1965-66
- Richard C. Gormley 1966-67
- Edward E. Davis 1967-69
- Richard K. Burke 1969-72
- William C. Smitherman 1972-77
- Michael D. Hawkins 1977-80
- Arthur B. Butler III 1980-81
- A. Melvin McDonald 1981-85
- Stephen M. McNamee 1985-90
- Linda A. Akers 1990-93
- Daniel G. Knauss 1993
- Janet Napolitano 1993-97
- Michael A. Johns 1997-98
- Jose de Jesus Rivera 1998-2001
- Paul K. Charlton 2001-2006
- Daniel G. Knauss 2007
- Diane Humetewa 2007-2009
- Dennis K. Burke 2009-2011
- John S. Leonardo 2012-2017
- Elizabeth A. Strange (Acting, January 2017 - June 2019)
- Michael G. Bailey 2019-2021
- Gary M. Restaino 2021-2025
- Rachel C. Hernandez (Acting, February 2025 - March 2025)
- Timothy Courchaine (March 2025 - present)

== See also ==
- Courts of Arizona
- List of current United States district judges
- List of United States federal courthouses in Arizona
