= Roger Gordon Strand =

American judge

Senior Judge of the United States District Court for the District of Arizona
- In office April 28, 2000 – September 7, 2017

Judge of the United States District Court for the District of Arizona
- In office July 22, 1985 – April 28, 2000
- Appointed by: Ronald Reagan
- Preceded by: Charles Andrew Muecke
- Succeeded by: Frederick J. Martone

Personal details
- Born: Roger Gordon Strand; April 28, 1934 Peekskill, New York, U.S.
- Died: September 7, 2017 (aged 83) Phoenix, Arizona, U.S.
- Education: Hamilton College (B.A.); Cornell Law School (LL.B.)

Roger Gordon Strand (April 28, 1934 – September 7, 2017) was a United States district judge of the United States District Court for the District of Arizona.

== Education and career ==
Born in Peekskill, New York, Strand received a Bachelor of Arts degree from Hamilton College in 1955 and a Bachelor of Laws from Cornell Law School in 1961. He graduated from National College of State Trial Judges (now the National Judicial College) in 1968. He was in the United States Navy as a Lieutenant (j.g.) from 1955 to 1958. He was a United States Naval Reserve Lieutenant from 1958 to 1961. He was in private practice in Phoenix, Arizona from 1961 to 1967. He was a judge of the Superior Court of Arizona from 1967 to 1985.

== Federal judicial service ==
Strand was nominated by President Ronald Reagan on June 25, 1985, to a seat on the United States District Court for the District of Arizona vacated by Judge Charles Andrew Muecke. He was confirmed by the United States Senate on July 19, 1985, and received his commission on July 22, 1985. He assumed senior status on April 28, 2000. He died on September 7, 2017, in Phoenix.

Legal offices
| Preceded by Charles Andrew Muecke | Judge of the United States District Court for the District of Arizona; 1985–2000 | Succeeded by Frederick J. Martone |
