= James Augustine Walsh =

American judge

Senior Judge of the United States District Court for the District of Arizona
- In office July 9, 1976 – May 2, 1991

Chief Judge of the United States District Court for the District of Arizona
- In office 1961–1972
- Preceded by: Office established
- Succeeded by: Walter Early Craig

Judge of the United States District Court for the District of Arizona
- In office July 7, 1952 – July 9, 1976
- Appointed by: Harry S. Truman
- Preceded by: Howard C. Speakman
- Succeeded by: Mary Anne Richey

Personal details
- Born: James Augustine Walsh; September 17, 1906 Westfield, Massachusetts, U.S.
- Died: May 2, 1991 (aged 84) Tucson, Arizona, U.S.
- Education: Georgetown Law (LL.B.)

James Augustine Walsh (September 17, 1906 – May 2, 1991) was a United States district judge of the United States District Court for the District of Arizona.

== Education and career ==
Born in Westfield, Massachusetts, Walsh received a Bachelor of Laws from Georgetown Law in 1928. He was in private practice in Mesa, Arizona from 1928 to 1941, and was a city attorney for the City of Mesa from 1936 to 1940. He was an Assistant United States Attorney of the District of Arizona in 1943. He was a county attorney of Maricopa County, Arizona from 1943 to 1944, and was a Judge of the Superior Court of Maricopa County from 1945 to 1947. He returned to private practice in Phoenix, Arizona from 1947 to 1952, and was chief counsel to the Arizona Code Commission from 1951 to 1952.

== Federal judicial service ==
On July 3, 1952, Walsh was nominated by President Harry S. Truman to a seat on the United States District Court for the District of Arizona vacated by Judge Howard C. Speakman. Walsh was confirmed by the United States Senate on July 5, 1952, and received his commission on July 7, 1952. He served as Chief Judge from 1961 to 1972, and assumed senior status on July 9, 1976. He served in that capacity until his death on May 2, 1991.

== Honor ==
The James A. Walsh United States Courthouse in Tucson, Arizona was renamed in Walsh's honor in 1985.

== Sources ==
Legal offices
Preceded by Howard C. Speakman	Judge of the United States District Court for the District of Arizona; 1952–1976	Succeeded by Mary Anne Richey
Preceded by Office established	Chief Judge of the United States District Court for the District of Arizona; 1961–1972	Succeeded by Walter Early Craig
