= Angela M. Martinez =

American judge (born 1972)

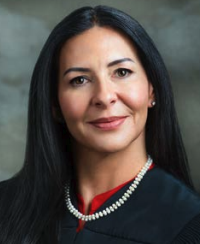

Judge of the United States District Court for the District of Arizona
- Incumbent
- Assumed office July 2, 2024
- Appointed by: Joe Biden
- Preceded by: James A. Soto

Magistrate Judge of the United States District Court for the District of Arizona
- In office March 30, 2023 – July 2, 2024

Personal details
- Born: Angela Marie Martinez; 1972 (age 53–54) Tucson, Arizona, U.S.
- Education: University of Arizona (BA, JD)

Angela M. Martinez (born 1972) is an American lawyer who has served as a United States district judge of the United States District Court for the District of Arizona since 2024. She previously served as a United States magistrate judge of the same court from 2023 to 2024.

== Education ==
Martinez earned a Bachelor of Arts from the University of Arizona in 1995 and a Juris Doctor from the University of Arizona James E. Rogers College of Law in 2000.

== Career ==
Martinez served as a law clerk for Judge John Roll of the United States District Court for the District of Arizona from 2000 to 2002. From 2002 to 2004, she was an associate at Lewis and Roca, L.L.P. in Phoenix and Tucson. From 2005 to 2009, she served as an assistant United States attorney in the District of Arizona and from 2012 to 2013, she was an associate at Farhang & Medcoff, P.L.L.C. From 2013 to 2015, she served as a law clerk for Judge Jennifer Zipps of the United States District Court for the District of Arizona. From 2015 to 2023, Martinez was previously an assistant United States attorney in the U.S. Attorney's Office for the District of Arizona.

=== Federal judicial service ===
On March 30, 2023, she was appointed to serve as a United States magistrate judge of the District of Arizona.

On February 21, 2024, President Joe Biden announced his intent to nominate Martinez to serve as a United States district judge of the United States District Court for the District of Arizona. On February 27, 2024, her nomination was sent to the Senate. President Biden nominated Martinez to the seat being vacated by Judge James A. Soto, who subsequently assumed senior status on July 1, 2024. On March 20, 2024, a hearing on her nomination was held before the Senate Judiciary Committee. On April 18, 2024, her nomination was reported out of committee by a 13–8 vote. On May 21, 2024, the United States Senate invoked cloture on her nomination by a 64–29 vote. On May 22, 2024, her nomination was confirmed by a 66–28 vote. Martinez is Biden's 200th judge to be confirmed. She received her judicial commission on July 2, 2024.

== See also ==
- List of Hispanic and Latino American jurists

Legal offices
Preceded by James A. Soto	Judge of the United States District Court for the District of Arizona; 2024–present	Incumbent
