= Raner Collins =

American judge (born 1952)

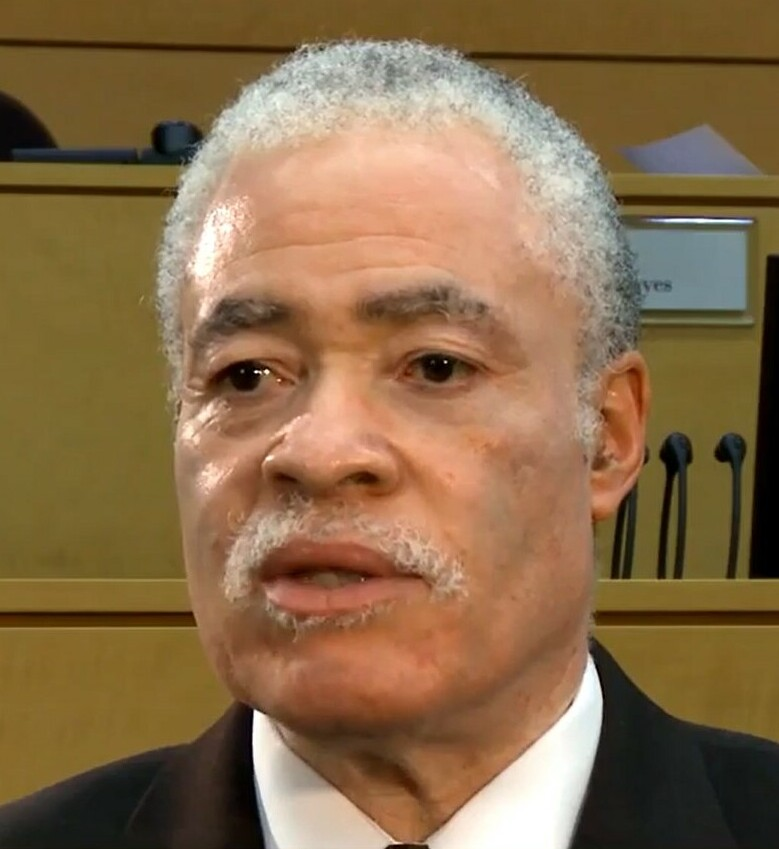
- Collins in 2018

Senior Judge of the United States District Court for the District of Arizona
- Incumbent
- Assumed office March 4, 2019

Chief Judge of the United States District Court for the District of Arizona
- In office September 3, 2013 – September 4, 2018
- Preceded by: Roslyn O. Silver
- Succeeded by: G. Murray Snow

Judge of the United States District Court for the District of Arizona
- In office August 3, 1998 – March 4, 2019
- Appointed by: Bill Clinton
- Preceded by: William Docker Browning
- Succeeded by: John C. Hinderaker

Personal details
- Born: Raner Christercunean Collins; 1952 (age 73–74) Malvern, Arkansas, U.S.
- Education: Arkansas Polytechnic College (BA); University of Arizona (JD)

Raner Christercunean Collins (born 1952) is a senior United States district judge of the United States District Court for the District of Arizona.

== Education and career ==
Born in Malvern, Arkansas, Collins received a Bachelor of Arts degree from Arkansas Polytechnic College (now Arkansas Tech University) in 1973 and a Juris Doctor from the University of Arizona College of Law (now James E. Rogers College of Law) in 1975. He was a law clerk in the Pima County, Arizona Attorney's Office from 1975 to 1976, and then a trial attorney for that office until 1981. He was a city magistrate for the City of Tucson Court from 1981 to 1983, thereafter returning to Pima County Attorney's Office as a county attorney until 1985. He was a superior court judge pro tempore of the Pima County Superior Court from 1985 to 1988, and a superior court judge there from 1988 to 1998.

=== Federal judicial service ===
On May 11, 1998, Collins was nominated by President Bill Clinton to a seat on the United States District Court for the District of Arizona vacated by Judge William Docker Browning. Collins was confirmed by the United States Senate on July 31, 1998, and received his commission on August 3, 1998. He became the first African-American Chief Judge on September 3, 2013, succeeding previous Chief Judge Roslyn O. Silver who took senior status. He finished his term as Chief Judge on September 4, 2018. He assumed senior status on March 4, 2019.

=== Notable ruling ===
Following the death of Chief Judge John Roll in the 2011 Tucson shooting, Collins signed an order on January 10, 2011 recusing all district and magistrate judges of the United States District Court for the District of Arizona from the prosecution of Jared Lee Loughner, citing their close ties to Chief Judge Roll.

== See also ==
- List of African-American federal judges
- List of African-American jurists

Legal offices
Preceded by William Docker Browning	Judge of the United States District Court for the District of Arizona; 1998–2019	Succeeded by John C. Hinderaker
Preceded by Roslyn O. Silver	Chief Judge of the United States District Court for the District of Arizona; 2013–2018	Succeeded by G. Murray Snow
