= Richard Bilby =

American judge

Richard Mansfield Bilby
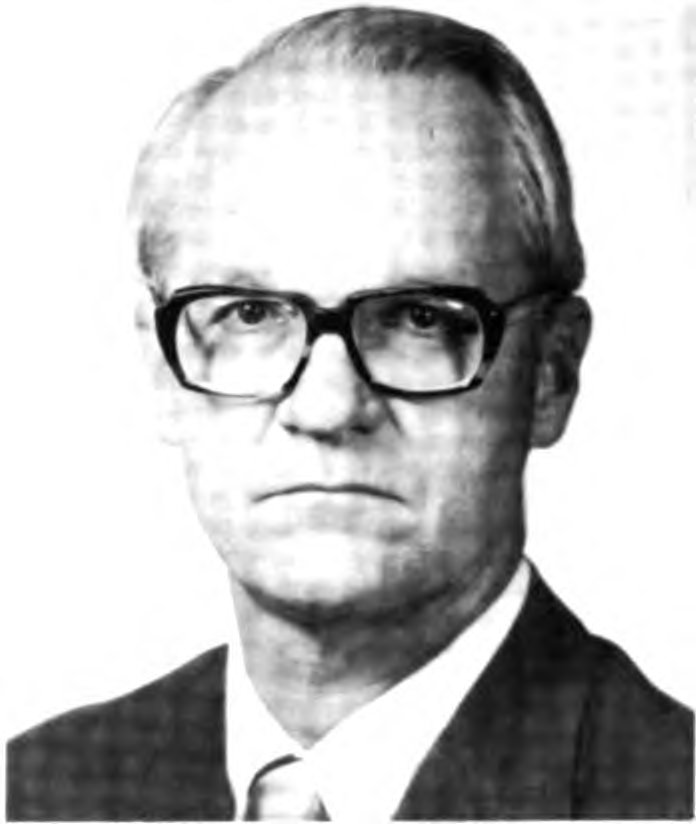

Senior Judge of the United States District Court for the District of Arizona
- In office May 29, 1996 – August 11, 1998

Chief Judge of the United States District Court for the District of Arizona
- In office 1984–1990
- Preceded by: Charles Andrew Muecke
- Succeeded by: William Docker Browning

Judge of the United States District Court for the District of Arizona
- In office September 26, 1979 – May 29, 1996
- Appointed by: Jimmy Carter
- Preceded by: William C. Frey
- Succeeded by: Frank R. Zapata

Personal details
- Born: Richard Mansfield Bilby; May 29, 1931 Tucson, Arizona, U.S.
- Died: August 11, 1998 (aged 67) Flagstaff, Arizona, U.S.
- Education: University of Arizona (BS); University of Michigan Law School (JD)

Richard Mansfield Bilby (May 29, 1931 – August 11, 1998) was a United States district judge of the United States District Court for the District of Arizona.

== Education and career ==
Born on May 29, 1931, in Tucson, Arizona, Bilby served in the United States Army as a Corporal from 1952 to 1954. He received a Bachelor of Science degree in 1955 from the University of Arizona and a Juris Doctor in 1958 from the University of Michigan Law School. He was a law clerk for Judge Richard Harvey Chambers of the United States Court of Appeals for the Ninth Circuit from 1958 to 1959. He was in private practice in Tucson from 1959 to 1979.

== Federal judicial service ==
=== Unsuccessful Court of Appeals nomination by Ford ===
Bilby was nominated to the United States Court of Appeals for the Ninth Circuit, to a seat being vacated by Judge Richard Harvey Chambers, by President Gerald Ford on August 3, 1976. However, the Senate never voted on his nomination and it expired with the end of the Congressional session.

=== District Court nomination by Carter ===
Bilby was nominated by President Jimmy Carter on June 5, 1979, to a seat on the United States District Court for the District of Arizona vacated by Judge William C. Frey. He was confirmed by the United States Senate on September 25, 1979, and received his commission on September 26, 1979. He served as Chief Judge from 1984 to 1990. He assumed senior status on May 29, 1996. His service terminated on August 11, 1998, due to his death.

=== Notable case ===
While a judge, Bilby probably was most known for having presided over the 1992 case against Charles Keating.

== Death ==
A lifelong resident of Tucson, Bilby died on August 11, 1998, while walking his dog near his summer home in Flagstaff, Arizona.

== Personal life ==
Bilby was survived by his wife, Elizabeth Thomas Bilby, and two daughters from a previous marriage that ended in divorce. Bilby's brother, Kenneth W. Bilby, was an executive vice president at RCA for many years.

== See also ==
- Gerald Ford judicial appointment controversies

== Sources ==
Legal offices
| Preceded by William C. Frey | Judge of the United States District Court for the District of Arizona; 1979–1996 | Succeeded by Frank R. Zapata |
| Preceded by Charles Andrew Muecke | Chief Judge of the United States District Court for the District of Arizona; 1984–1990 | Succeeded by William Docker Browning |
