= Krissa M. Lanham =

American judge (born 1980)

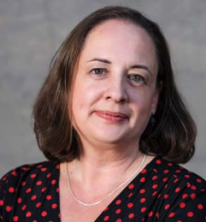

Judge of the United States District Court for the District of Arizona
- Incumbent
- Assumed office June 3, 2024
- Appointed by: Joe Biden
- Preceded by: Douglas L. Rayes

Personal details
- Born: Krissa Marie Lanham; 1980 (age 45–46) Bangkok, Thailand
- Education: Yale University (BA, JD)

Krissa Marie Lanham (born 1980) is an American lawyer who is serving as a United States district judge of the United States District Court for the District of Arizona.

== Education ==
Lanham attended Bangkok Patana School, graduating in 1998. She earned a Bachelor of Arts, summa cum laude, from Yale University in 2002 and a Juris Doctor from Yale Law School in 2007.

== Career ==
Lanham served as a law clerk for Judge Robert Chatigny of the United States District Court for the District of Connecticut from 2007 to 2008 and for Judge Barry G. Silverman of the United States Court of Appeals for the Ninth Circuit from 2008 to 2009. From 2009 to 2024, she was an assistant United States attorney in the U.S. Attorney's Office for the District of Arizona. She served as appellate chief in that office from 2020 to 2024, after previously serving as the deputy appellate chief and human trafficking coordinator.

=== Federal judicial service ===
On February 21, 2024, President Joe Biden announced his intent to nominate Lanham to serve as a United States district judge of the United States District Court for the District of Arizona. On February 27, 2024, her nomination was sent to the Senate. President Biden nominated Lanham to the seat being vacated by Judge Douglas L. Rayes, who subsequently assumed senior status on June 1, 2024. On March 20, 2024, a hearing on her nomination was held before the Senate Judiciary Committee. On April 18, 2024, her nomination was reported out of committee by a 13–8 vote. On May 21, 2024, the United States Senate invoked cloture on her nomination by a 66–27 vote. Later that day, her nomination was confirmed by a 66–26 vote. She received her judicial commission on June 3, 2024.

Legal offices
Preceded by Douglas L. Rayes	Judge of the United States District Court for the District of Arizona; 2024–present	Incumbent
