= William C. Frey =

United States federal judge (1919–1979)

Judge of the United States District Court for the District of Arizona
- In office December 1, 1970 – February 16, 1979
- Appointed by: Richard Nixon
- Preceded by: Seat established by 84 Stat. 294
- Succeeded by: Richard Bilby

Personal details
- Born: William C. Frey; July 24, 1919 Tucson, Arizona, U.S.
- Died: February 16, 1979 (aged 59) Honduras
- Education: University of Arizona (B.A.); James E. Rogers College of Law (J.D.)

William C. Frey (July 24, 1919 – February 16, 1979) was a United States district judge of the United States District Court for the District of Arizona.

== Education and career ==
Born in Tucson, Arizona, Frey was in the United States Army as a Major during World War II, from 1941 to 1946. He received a Bachelor of Arts degree from the University of Arizona in 1947 and a Juris Doctor from the James E. Rogers College of Law at the University of Arizona in 1950. He was in private practice in Tucson from 1949 to 1950. He was an assistant state attorney general of Arizona from 1953 to 1955, returning to private practice in Tucson from 1956 to 1964. He was then a judge of the Superior Court of Pima County, Arizona from 1964 to 1970.

== Federal judicial service ==
On October 7, 1970, Frey was nominated by President Richard Nixon to a new seat on the United States District Court for the District of Arizona created by 84 Stat. 294. He was confirmed by the United States Senate on November 25, 1970, and received his commission on December 1, 1970, serving in that capacity until his death on February 16, 1979, of a massive heart attack while vacationing on an island off the coast of Honduras. Frey had suffered a heart attack five years earlier.

== Sources ==
Legal offices
Preceded by Seat established by 84 Stat. 294	Judge of the United States District Court for the District of Arizona; 1970–1979	Succeeded by Richard Bilby
