= David W. Ling =

American federal judge (1890–1965)

Senior Judge of the United States District Court for the District of Arizona
- In office October 11, 1964 – May 17, 1965

Judge of the United States District Court for the District of Arizona
- In office June 3, 1936 – October 11, 1964
- Appointed by: Franklin D. Roosevelt
- Preceded by: Fred Clinton Jacobs
- Succeeded by: Charles Andrew Muecke

Personal details
- Born: David W. Ling; January 22, 1890 Ann Arbor, Michigan, U.S.
- Died: May 17, 1965 (aged 75) Phoenix, Arizona, U.S.
- Education: USC Gould School of Law (LL.B.)

David W. Ling (January 22, 1890 – May 17, 1965) was a United States district judge of the United States District Court for the District of Arizona.

== Education and career ==
Born in Ann Arbor, Michigan, Ling received a Bachelor of Laws from the USC Gould School of Law in 1913. He was in private practice in Clifton, Arizona from 1913 to 1927, and was a county attorney of Greenlee County, Arizona from 1921 to 1927. He was a Judge of the Superior Court of Greenlee County from 1927 to 1936.

== Federal judicial service ==
On May 28, 1936, Ling was nominated by President Franklin D. Roosevelt to a seat on the United States District Court for the District of Arizona vacated by Judge Fred Clinton Jacobs. Ling was confirmed by the United States Senate on May 30, 1936, and received his commission on June 3, 1936. He assumed senior status on October 11, 1964. Ling served in that capacity until his death on May 17, 1965, in Phoenix, Arizona.

== Sources ==
Legal offices
Preceded by Fred Clinton Jacobs	Judge of the United States District Court for the District of Arizona; 1936–1964	Succeeded by Charles Andrew Muecke
