= Susan Brnovich =

American judge (born 1968)

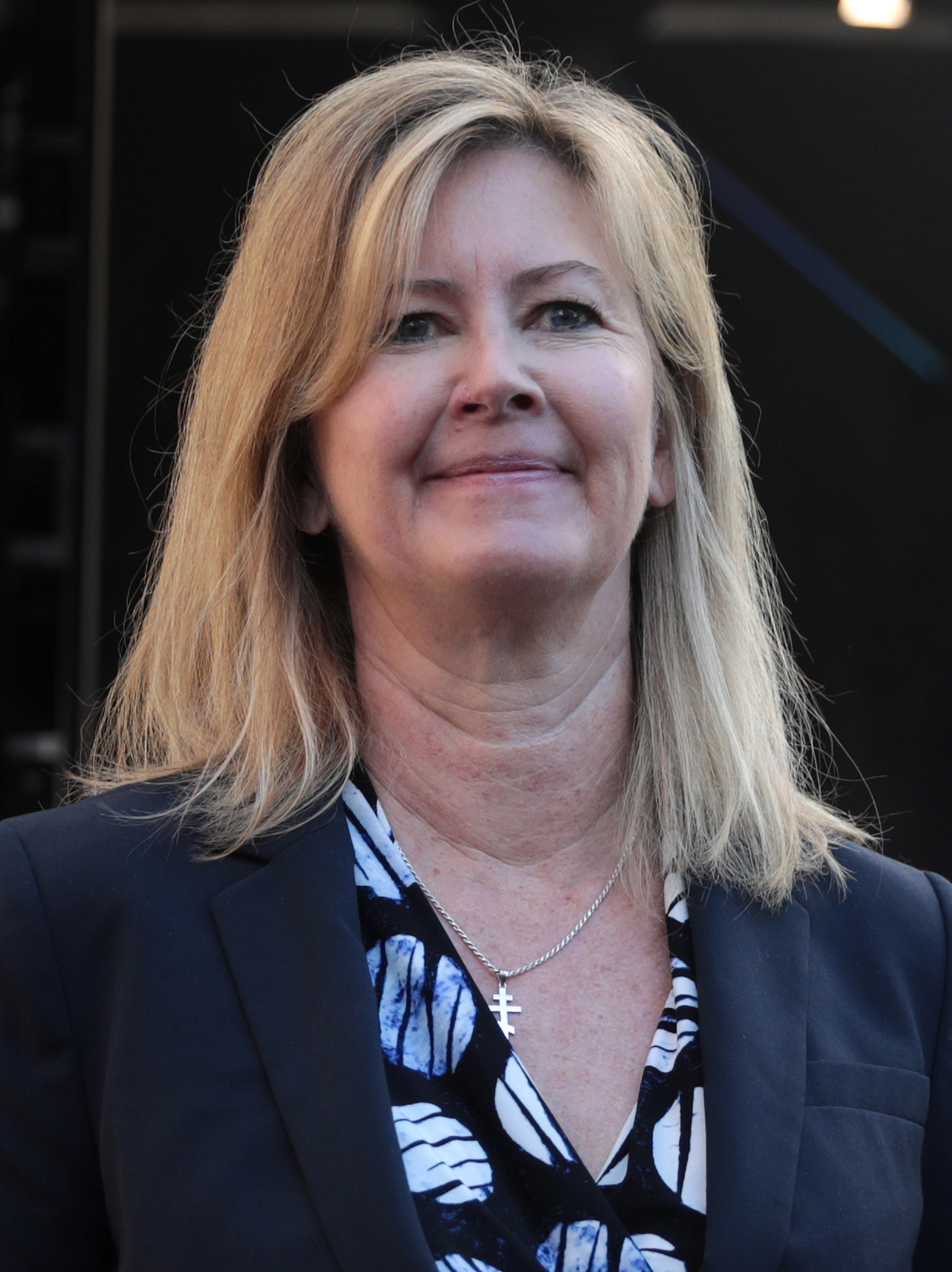
- Brnovich in 2019

Judge of the United States District Court for the District of Arizona
- Incumbent
- Assumed office October 23, 2018
- Appointed by: Donald Trump
- Preceded by: Neil V. Wake

Judge of the Maricopa County Superior Court
- In office January 2009 – October 23, 2018
- Appointed by: Janet Napolitano
- Succeeded by: Joseph Kiefer

Personal details
- Born: Susan Marie Skibba; June 6, 1968 (age 58) Madison, Wisconsin, U.S.
- Spouse: Mark Brnovich (died 2026)
- Children: 2
- Education: University of Wisconsin–Madison (BBA, MS, JD)

Susan Marie Skibba Brnovich (née Skibba; born June 6, 1968) is a United States district judge of the United States District Court for the District of Arizona.

== Biography ==
Brnovich earned her Bachelor of Business Administration, Master of Science, and Juris Doctor from the University of Wisconsin–Madison.

Brnovich began her legal career serving as a prosecutor with the Maricopa County Attorney's Office. During her eight years as a prosecutor, Brnovich tried 49 jury trials and one bench trial. In 2003, she became a commissioner on the Maricopa County Superior Court, where she presided over numerous criminal jury trials over the next five years. Brnovich was appointed by Governor of Arizona Janet Napolitano as a trial court judge in January 2009 and was retained by voters in both 2012 and 2016. As a state judge, Brnovich presided over approximately 100 trials. Her state court service ended in 2018 upon her elevation to the federal judiciary.

Brnovich has been a member of the Federalist Society since 2011.

== Federal judicial service ==
On January 23, 2018, President Donald Trump announced his intent to nominate Brnovich to an undetermined seat on the United States District Court for the District of Arizona. On January 24, 2018, her nomination was sent to the United States Senate. She was nominated to the seat vacated by Judge Neil V. Wake, who assumed senior status on July 5, 2016. On May 9, 2018, a hearing on her nomination was held before the Senate Judiciary Committee. Her nomination was reported out of committee on June 7, 2018, by voice vote. On October 11, 2018, her nomination was confirmed by voice vote. She received her judicial commission on October 23, 2018.

== Personal life ==
Brnovich was married to Republican former Attorney General of Arizona Mark Brnovich until his death in early 2026. They have two children.

== Electoral history ==
2012

Maricopa County Superior Court – Retain Susan Brnovich, November 6, 2012
Party	Candidate	Votes	%
Nonpartisan	Yes	502,238	72.1
Nonpartisan	No	194,206	27.9
Majority		308,032	44.2
Total votes		696,444	100

2016

Maricopa County Superior Court – Retain Susan Brnovich, November 8, 2016
Party	Candidate	Votes	%	±%
Nonpartisan	Yes	628,557	73.5	+1.4
Nonpartisan	No	226,287	26.5	−1.4
Majority		402,270	47.1	+2.8
Total votes		854,844	100	+22.7

Legal offices
Preceded by Neil Vincent Wake	Judge of the United States District Court for the District of Arizona; 2018–present	Incumbent
