= Frederick J. Martone =

American judge (born 1943)

Frederick James Martone
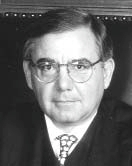

Senior Judge of the United States District Court for the District of Arizona
- Incumbent
- Assumed office January 30, 2013

Judge of the United States District Court for the District of Arizona
- In office December 21, 2001 – January 30, 2013
- Appointed by: George W. Bush
- Preceded by: Roger Gordon Strand
- Succeeded by: Douglas L. Rayes

Justice of the Supreme Court of Arizona
- In office 1992–2001
- Appointed by: Fife Symington III
- Preceded by: James Duke Cameron
- Succeeded by: Rebecca White Berch

Judge of the Superior Court of Arizona
- In office 1985–1992

Personal details
- Born: November 8, 1943 (age 82) Fall River, Massachusetts, U.S.
- Party: Republican
- Education: College of the Holy Cross (BS); University of Notre Dame (JD); Harvard University (LLM)

Frederick James Martone (born November 8, 1943) is an American lawyer who serves as a senior United States district judge of the United States District Court for the District of Arizona.

== Early life and education ==
Born in Fall River, Massachusetts, Martone received a Bachelor of Science from College of the Holy Cross in 1965 and was in the United States Air Force from 1965 to 1969. He then received a Juris Doctor from Notre Dame Law School in 1972 and a Master of Laws from Harvard Law School in 1975. He was a law clerk to Edward F. Hennessey of the Supreme Judicial Court of Massachusetts from 1972 to 1973.

== Career ==
Martone was in private practice in Phoenix, Arizona from 1973 to 1985, during which time he was a staff attorney to the Supreme Judicial Court of Massachusetts from 1974 to 1975.

== Judicial service ==
Martone was a judge on the Superior Court of Arizona from 1985 to 1992, and a justice of the Supreme Court of Arizona from 1992 to 2001.

On September 10, 2001, Martone was nominated by President George W. Bush to a seat on the United States District Court for the District of Arizona vacated by Roger Gordon Strand. Martone was confirmed by the United States Senate on December 13, 2001, and received his commission on December 21, 2001. He took senior status on January 30, 2013.

== Sources ==
Legal offices
Preceded by Roger Gordon Strand	Judge of the United States District Court for the District of Arizona; 2001–2013	Succeeded by Douglas L. Rayes
