= James A. Teilborg =

American judge (born 1942)

James Teilborg

Senior Judge of the United States District Court for the District of Arizona
- Incumbent
- Assumed office January 30, 2013

Judge of the United States District Court for the District of Arizona
- In office October 13, 2000 – January 30, 2013
- Appointed by: Bill Clinton
- Preceded by: Seat established by 113 Stat. 1501
- Succeeded by: Steven Paul Logan

Personal details
- Born: December 29, 1942 (age 83) Pueblo, Colorado, U.S.
- Education: University of Arizona College of Law (JD)

James Andrew Teilborg (born December 29, 1942) is a senior United States district judge of the United States District Court for the District of Arizona.

== Education and career ==
Teilborg was born in Pueblo, Colorado. He received a Juris Doctor from the University of Arizona College of Law in 1966. He served in the Arizona Air National Guard from 1966 to 1974, and then as a Colonel in the United States Air Force Reserve from 1974 to 1997. He was in private practice in Phoenix, Arizona from 1967 to 2000, during which time he served as president of the International Association of Defense Counsel (IADC) in 1981 and was elected a Fellow of the American College of Trial Lawyers.

== Federal judicial service ==
On July 21, 2000, Teilborg was nominated by President Bill Clinton to a new seat on the United States District Court for the District of Arizona created by 113 Stat. 1501. He was confirmed by the United States Senate on October 3, 2000, and received his commission on October 13, 2000. He took senior status on January 30, 2013.

== Notable cases ==
In 2012, Teilborg upheld Arizona House Bill 2036, which prohibited abortion in Arizona at 20 weeks, ruling that it "does not impose a substantial obstacle to previability abortions." Teilborg cited the state's finding of "substantial and well-documented evidence" that fetuses have the capacity to feel pain at 20 weeks gestation. The Ninth Circuit Court of Appeals blocked the ban from taking place pending their review and reversed Teiborg's ruling on May 21, 2013.

Legal offices
Preceded by Seat established by 113 Stat. 1501	Judge of the United States District Court for the District of Arizona; 2000–2013	Succeeded by Steven Paul Logan
