= Mary Anne Richey =

American judge (1917–1983)

Judge of the United States District Court for the District of Arizona
- In office June 16, 1976 – November 25, 1983
- Appointed by: Gerald Ford
- Preceded by: James Augustine Walsh
- Succeeded by: William Docker Browning

Personal details
- Born: Mary Anne Reimann; October 24, 1917 Shelbyville, Indiana, U.S.
- Died: November 25, 1983 (aged 66)
- Education: James E. Rogers College of Law (LL.B.)

Mary Anne Richey (October 24, 1917 – November 25, 1983) was a United States district judge of the United States District Court for the District of Arizona.

== Education and career ==
Born Mary Anne Reimann in Shelbyville, Indiana, Richey was in the United States Army, Women's Army Service Pilots during World War II, from 1943 to 1945. She received a Bachelor of Laws from the James E. Rogers College of Law at the University of Arizona in 1951. She was in private practice in Tucson, Arizona from 1951 to 1952. She was a deputy county attorney of Pima County, Arizona from 1952 to 1954. She was an Assistant United States Attorney of the District of Arizona in Tucson from 1954 to 1960. She was the United States Attorney for the District of Arizona from 1960 to 1961. She was in private practice in Tucson from 1962 to 1964. She was a Judge of the Superior Court of Arizona in Pima County from 1964 to 1976. She was the Associate Presiding Judge from 1972 to 1976.

== Federal judicial service ==
Richey was nominated by President Gerald Ford on June 2, 1976, to a seat on the United States District Court for the District of Arizona vacated by Judge James Augustine Walsh. She was confirmed by the United States Senate on June 16, 1976, and received her commission the same day. Richey served in that capacity until her death of cancer on November 25, 1983.

== Sources ==
Legal offices
Preceded by James Augustine Walsh	Judge of the United States District Court for the District of Arizona; 1976–1983	Succeeded by William Docker Browning
