= William Docker Browning =

American judge (1931–2008)

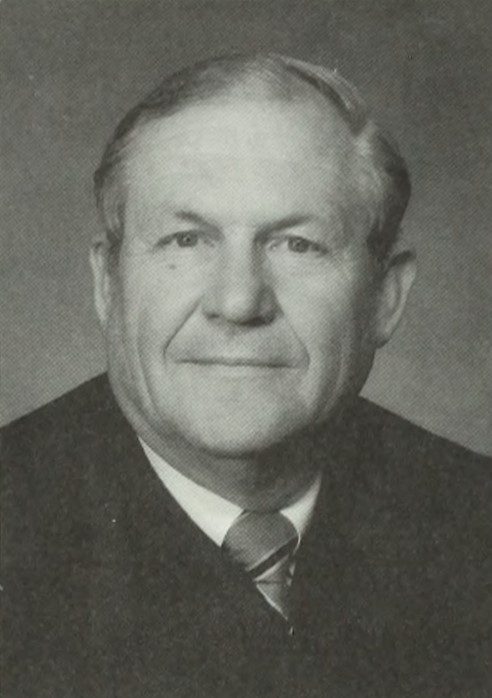

Senior Judge of the United States District Court for the District of Arizona
- In office May 14, 1998 – February 26, 2008

Chief Judge of the United States District Court for the District of Arizona
- In office 1990–1994
- Preceded by: Richard Bilby
- Succeeded by: Robert C. Broomfield

Judge of the United States District Court for the District of Arizona
- In office May 3, 1984 – May 14, 1998
- Appointed by: Ronald Reagan
- Preceded by: Mary Anne Richey
- Succeeded by: Raner Collins

Personal details
- Born: William Docker Browning; May 19, 1931 Tucson, Arizona, U.S.
- Died: February 26, 2008 (aged 76)
- Education: University of Arizona (BS, BA, LLB)

William Docker Browning (May 19, 1931 – February 26, 2008) was an American attorney and jurist who served as a United States district judge of the United States District Court for the District of Arizona.

== Early life and education ==
Born in Tucson, Arizona, Browning received a Bachelor of Science degree and Bachelor of Arts degree from the University of Arizona in 1954 and was a United States Air Force Lieutenant from 1954 to 1957. He received a Bachelor of Laws from the University of Arizona College of Law in 1960.

== Career ==
After earning his law degree, Browning entered private practice in Tucson from 1960 to 1984.

On April 4, 1984, Browning was nominated by President Ronald Reagan to a seat on the United States District Court for the District of Arizona vacated by Judge Mary Anne Richey. He was confirmed by the United States Senate on April 24, 1984, and received his commission on May 3, 1984. He served as Chief Judge from 1990 to 1994. He assumed senior status on May 14, 1998. Browning served in that capacity until his death, in 2008.

== Sources ==
Legal offices
| Preceded by Mary Anne Richey | Judge of the United States District Court for the District of Arizona; 1984–1998 | Succeeded by Raner Collins |
| Preceded by Richard Bilby | Chief Judge of the United States District Court for the District of Arizona; 1990–1994 | Succeeded by Robert C. Broomfield |
