= Arthur Marshall Davis =

American judge (1907–1963)

Judge of the United States District Court for the District of Arizona
- In office August 21, 1961 – July 11, 1963
- Appointed by: John F. Kennedy
- Preceded by: Seat established by 75 Stat. 80
- Succeeded by: Walter Early Craig

Personal details
- Born: Arthur Marshall Davis; June 7, 1907 Winslow, Arizona Territory
- Died: July 11, 1963 (aged 56)
- Education: George Washington University Law School (LL.B.)

Arthur Marshall Davis (June 7, 1907 – July 11, 1963) was a United States district judge of the United States District Court for the District of Arizona.

== Education and career ==
Born in Winslow, Arizona Territory, Davis received a Bachelor of Laws from George Washington University Law School in 1933. He was in private practice of law in Phoenix, Arizona from 1935 to 1961.

== Federal judicial service ==
Davis was nominated by President John F. Kennedy on August 8, 1961, to the United States District Court for the District of Arizona, to a new seat created by 75 Stat. 80. He was confirmed by the United States Senate on August 21, 1961, and received his commission the same day. His service was terminated on July 11, 1963, due to his death.

== Sources ==
Legal offices
Preceded by Seat established by 75 Stat. 80	Judge of the United States District Court for the District of Arizona; 1961–1963	Succeeded by Walter Early Craig
