= Howard C. Speakman =

American judge in Arizona (1892–1952)

Judge of the United States District Court for the District of Arizona
- In office April 13, 1946 – June 17, 1952
- Appointed by: Harry S. Truman
- Preceded by: Albert Morris Sames
- Succeeded by: James Augustine Walsh

Personal details
- Born: Howard C. Speakman; May 25, 1892 Skidmore, Missouri, U.S.
- Died: June 17, 1952 (aged 60) Long Beach, California, U.S.
- Education: University of Oklahoma (A.B.); University of Oklahoma College of Law (LL.B.)

Howard Cottrell Speakman (May 25, 1892 – June 17, 1952) was a United States district judge of the United States District Court for the District of Arizona.

== Education and career ==
Born in Skidmore, Missouri, Speakman received an Artium Baccalaureus degree from the University of Oklahoma in 1912 and a Bachelor of Laws from the University of Oklahoma College of Law in 1915. He was in private practice in Oklahoma from 1915 to 1917. He was in the United States Army Coast Artillery Corps from 1917 to 1919 and was a private. He was in private practice in Phoenix, Arizona from 1920 to 1930, and served as deputy county attorney in Maricopa County, Arizona. He was a Judge of the Superior Court of Arizona Division 3 from 1930 to 1946.

=== Notable case ===
In 1932 in Phoenix, Speakman presided at the murder trial of Winnie Ruth Judd, a case which achieved considerable notoriety. He sentenced the defendant to be executed by hanging, a sentence which was subsequently repealed after she was found to be mentally incompetent.

== Federal judicial service ==
Speakman was nominated by President Harry S. Truman on March 27, 1946, to a seat on the United States District Court for the District of Arizona vacated by Judge Albert Morris Sames. He was confirmed by the United States Senate on April 9, 1946, and received his commission on April 13, 1946. Speakman served in that capacity until his death on June 17, 1952, at the Long Beach Veterans Hospital, in Long Beach, California, while he was vacationing in southern California.

== Sources ==
Legal offices
Preceded by Albert Morris Sames	Judge of the United States District Court for the District of Arizona; 1946–1952	Succeeded by James Augustine Walsh
