= Fred Clinton Jacobs =

American judge

Senior Judge of the United States District Court for the District of Arizona
- In office May 31, 1936 – February 21, 1958

Judge of the United States District Court for the District of Arizona
- In office March 2, 1923 – May 31, 1936
- Appointed by: Warren G. Harding
- Preceded by: Seat established by 42 Stat. 837
- Succeeded by: David W. Ling

Personal details
- Born: Fred Clinton Jacobs; September 13, 1865 Winchester, Massachusetts, U.S.
- Died: February 21, 1958 (aged 92)
- Education: University of Chicago

Fred Clinton Jacobs (September 13, 1865 – February 21, 1958) was a United States district judge of the United States District Court for the District of Arizona.

== Education and career ==
Born in Winchester, Massachusetts, Jacobs attended the University of Chicago. He was in private practice in San Jose, California from 1895 to 1906. He was in private practice in Phoenix, Arizona Territory (State of Arizona from February 14, 1912) from 1906 to 1923.

== Federal judicial service ==
Jacobs was nominated by President Warren G. Harding on February 28, 1923, to the United States District Court for the District of Arizona, to a new seat created by 42 Stat. 837. He was confirmed by the United States Senate on March 2, 1923, and received his commission the same day. He assumed senior status on May 31, 1936. Jacobs served in that capacity until his death on February 21, 1958.

== Sources ==
Legal offices
| Preceded by Seat established by 42 Stat. 837 | Judge of the United States District Court for the District of Arizona; 1923–1936 | Succeeded by David W. Ling |
