= Frank R. Zapata =

American judge (born 1944)

Frank Ramirez Zapata
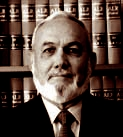

Senior Judge of the United States District Court for the District of Arizona
- Incumbent
- Assumed office August 3, 2010

Judge of the United States District Court for the District of Arizona
- In office August 1, 1996 – August 3, 2010
- Appointed by: Bill Clinton
- Preceded by: Richard Bilby
- Succeeded by: Rosemary Márquez

Magistrate Judge of the United States District Court for the District of Arizona
- In office 1994–1996

Personal details
- Born: Frank Ramirez Zapata; July 1, 1944 (age 81) Safford, Arizona, U.S.
- Education: Eastern Arizona College (AA); University of Arizona (BA, JD)

Frank Ramirez Zapata (born July 1, 1944) is a senior United States district judge of the United States District Court for the District of Arizona.

== Early life and education ==
Zapata was born in Safford, Arizona. He received an Associate of Arts degree from Eastern Arizona College in 1964, a Bachelor of Arts degree from the University of Arizona in 1966, and a Juris Doctor from the University of Arizona College of Law in 1973.

== Career ==
Zapata was a Staff attorney of Pima County Legal Aid Society, Arizona from 1973 to 1974. He was an Assistant federal public defender, Arizona from 1974 to 1984. He was a Chief assistant federal public defender, Arizona from 1984 to 1994. He was an Assistant adjunct professor, University of Arizona College of Law from 1988 to 1990.

=== Federal judicial service ===
Zapata served as a United States magistrate judge of the United States District Court for the District of Arizona from 1994 to 1996.

He was nominated by President Bill Clinton on March 29, 1996, to a seat vacated by Judge Richard Mansfield Bilby. He was confirmed by the United States Senate on July 31, 1996, and received his commission on August 1, 1996. He took senior status on August 3, 2010.

== Awards and recognition ==
In 2013, Zapata received the Public Service Award from the University of Arizona Alumni Association

== See also ==
- List of Hispanic and Latino American jurists

== Sources ==
Legal offices
Preceded by Richard Bilby	Judge of the United States District Court for the District of Arizona; 1996–2010	Succeeded by Rosemary Márquez
