= John C. Hinderaker =

American judge (born 1968)

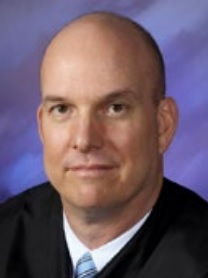

Judge of the United States District Court for the District of Arizona
- Incumbent
- Assumed office September 29, 2020
- Appointed by: Donald Trump
- Preceded by: Raner Collins

Judge of the Pima County Superior Court
- In office February 27, 2018 – September 29, 2020
- Appointed by: Doug Ducey
- Preceded by: Sean Brearcliffe
- Succeeded by: Jeffrey Sklar

Personal details
- Born: John Charles Hinderaker; 1968 (age 57–58) Indio, California, U.S.
- Party: Democratic
- Education: University of California, Santa Barbara (BA); University of Arizona (JD)

John Charles Hinderaker (born 1968) is a United States district judge of the United States District Court for the District of Arizona.

== Education ==
Hinderaker earned his Bachelor of Arts in Business Economics, with honors, from the University of California, Santa Barbara, in 1991 and his Juris Doctor, magna cum laude, from the University of Arizona College of Law in 1996, where he was a member of the Arizona Law Review.

== Career ==
Upon graduation from law school, Hinderaker served as a law clerk to Judge John Roll and Magistrate Judge Raymond T. Terlizzi, both of the United States District Court for the District of Arizona. He was hired as an associate at the law firm of Lewis Roca Rothgerber Christie in Tucson, Arizona, in 1998 and became a partner in 2003, where his practice focused on commercial litigation.

=== State judicial service ===
From 2018 to 2020, he served as a Judge on the Pima County Superior Court after being appointed by Arizona Governor Doug Ducey. He was appointed to fill the vacancy caused by the elevation of Judge Sean Brearcliffe to the Arizona Court of Appeals. His tenure on the state court bench ended when he became a Federal district judge.

=== Federal judicial service ===
On November 6, 2019, President Donald Trump announced his intent to nominate Hinderaker to serve as a United States district judge for the United States District Court for the District of Arizona. On December 2, 2019, his nomination was sent to the Senate. He was recommended to Trump by Senator Kyrsten Sinema. While Hinderaker is a Democrat, he was appointed as a district judge by a Republican Governor. President Trump nominated Hinderaker to the seat vacated by Judge Raner Collins, who assumed senior status on March 4, 2019. A hearing on his nomination before the Senate Judiciary Committee was held on December 4, 2019. On March 5, 2020, his nomination was reported out of committee by a 16–6 vote. On September 23, 2020, the United States Senate invoked cloture on his nomination by a 71–26 vote. His nomination was confirmed later that day by a 70–27 vote. He received his judicial commission on September 29, 2020.

Legal offices
Preceded by Sean Brearcliffe	Judge of the Pima County Superior Court; 2018–2020	Succeeded by Jeffrey Sklar
Preceded by Raner Collins	Judge of the United States District Court for the District of Arizona; 2020–present	Incumbent
