= Albert Morris Sames =

American judge

Senior Judge of the United States District Court for the District of Arizona
- In office April 1, 1946 – March 16, 1958

Judge of the United States District Court for the District of Arizona
- In office February 21, 1931 – April 1, 1946
- Appointed by: Herbert Hoover
- Preceded by: William Henry Sawtelle
- Succeeded by: Howard C. Speakman

Personal details
- Born: Albert Morris Sames; February 9, 1873 Rockford, Illinois, U.S.
- Died: March 16, 1958 (aged 85)
- Party: Republican
- Education: University of Wisconsin Law School (LL.B.); George Washington University Law School (LL.M.)

Albert Morris Sames (February 9, 1873 – March 16, 1958) was a United States district judge of the United States District Court for the District of Arizona.

== Education and career ==
Born on February 9, 1873, in Rockford, Illinois, Sames received a Bachelor of Laws in 1894 from the University of Wisconsin Law School and a Master of Laws in 1895 from the Columbian University School of Law (now the George Washington University Law School). He entered private practice in Los Angeles, California from 1898 to 1899. He was in private practice in Solomonville, Arizona Territory, from 1899 to 1902. He was in private practice in Douglas, Arizona Territory (State of Arizona from February 14, 1912) from 1902 to 1916. He was an assistant district attorney for Cochise County, Arizona Territory in 1904. He was city clerk and Treasurer for Douglas in 1905. He was a United States Commissioner for the United States District Court for the District of Arizona from 1906 to 1914. He was Chairman of the Republican Territorial Central Committee from 1911 to 1912. He was the city attorney of Douglas from 1914 to 1916. He was Chairman of the Arizona State Republican Committee from 1918 to 1920. He was a Judge of the Superior Court of Arizona for Cochise County from 1921 to 1931.

== Federal judicial service ==
Sames was nominated by President Herbert Hoover on January 29, 1931, to a seat on the United States District Court for the District of Arizona vacated by Judge William Henry Sawtelle. He was confirmed by the United States Senate on February 6, 1931, and received his commission on February 21, 1931. He assumed senior status on April 1, 1946. His service terminated on March 16, 1958, due to his death.

== Sources ==
Legal offices
Preceded by William Henry Sawtelle	Judge of the United States District Court for the District of Arizona; 1931–1946	Succeeded by Howard C. Speakman
