= David C. Bury =

American judge (born 1942)

David Charles Bury
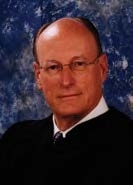

Senior Judge of the United States District Court for the District of Arizona
- Incumbent
- Assumed office December 31, 2012

Judge of the United States District Court for the District of Arizona
- In office March 19, 2002 – December 31, 2012
- Appointed by: George W. Bush
- Preceded by: Seat established by 114 Stat. 2762
- Succeeded by: James A. Soto

Personal details
- Born: December 9, 1942 (age 83) Tulsa, Oklahoma, U.S.
- Education: Oklahoma State University (BS); University of Arizona (JD)

David Charles Bury (born December 9, 1942) is a senior United States district judge of the United States District Court for the District of Arizona.

== Education and career ==
Born in Tulsa, Oklahoma, Bury received a Bachelor of Science from Oklahoma State University in 1964 and a Juris Doctor from the University of Arizona College of Law in 1967. He was in private practice in Tucson, Arizona, from 1967 to 2002.

== District court service ==
On September 10, 2001, Bury was nominated by President George W. Bush to a new seat on the United States District Court for the District of Arizona created by 114 Stat. 2762. He was confirmed by the United States Senate on March 15, 2002, and received his commission on March 19, 2002. He took senior status on December 31, 2012, and was succeeded by Judge James Alan Soto.

== Sources ==
Legal offices
Preceded by Seat established by 114 Stat. 2762	Judge of the United States District Court for the District of Arizona; 2002–2012	Succeeded by James A. Soto
