= Stephen M. McNamee =

American judge (born 1942)

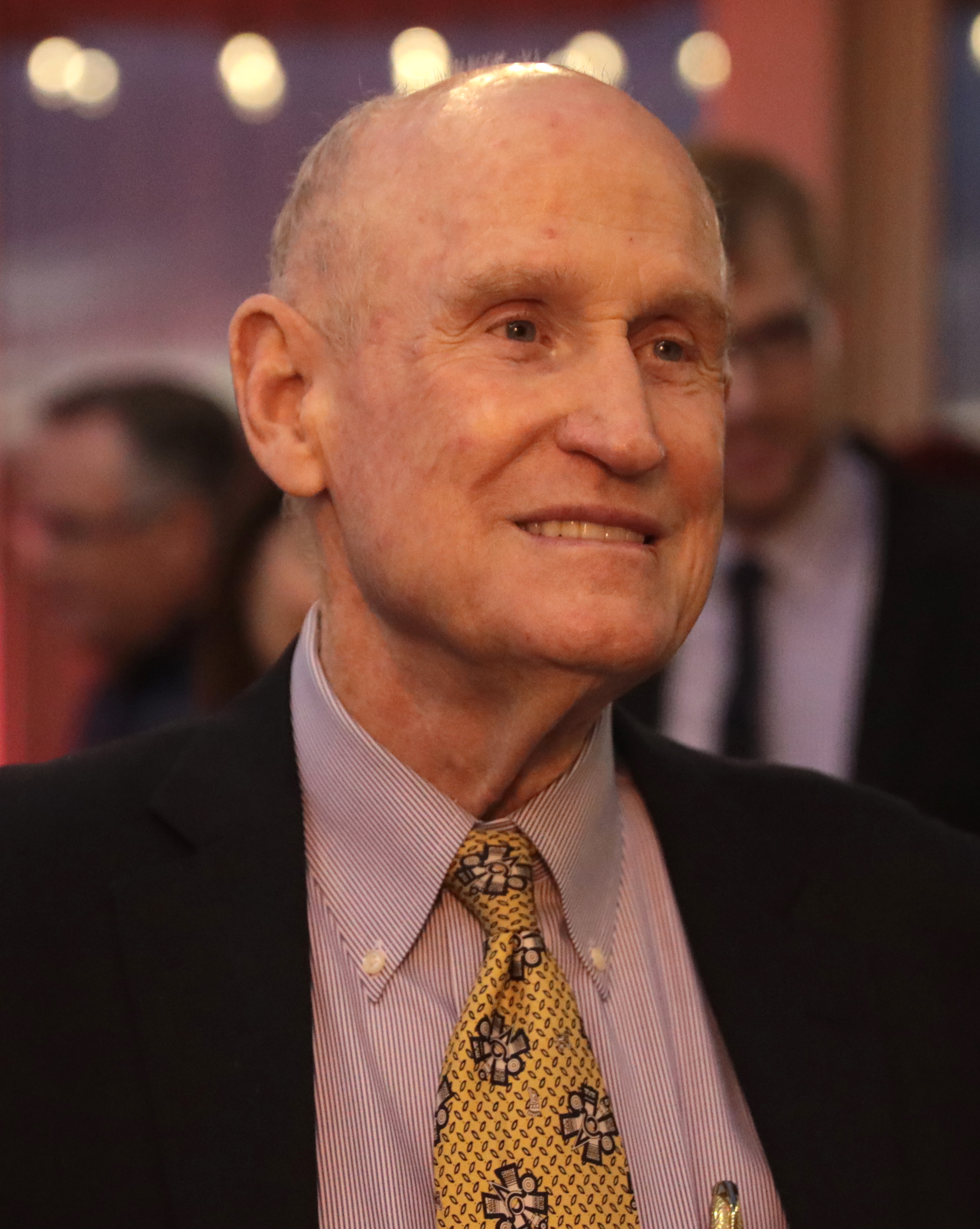

Senior Judge of the United States District Court for the District of Arizona
- Incumbent
- Assumed office October 1, 2007

Chief Judge of the United States District Court for the District of Arizona
- In office 1999–2006
- Preceded by: Robert C. Broomfield
- Succeeded by: John Roll

Judge of the United States District Court for the District of Arizona
- In office June 4, 1990 – October 1, 2007
- Appointed by: George H. W. Bush
- Preceded by: Charles Leach Hardy
- Succeeded by: G. Murray Snow

Personal details
- Born: Stephen M. McNamee; 1942 (age 83–84) Cincinnati, Ohio, U.S.
- Education: University of Cincinnati (BA); University of Arizona (MA, JD)

Stephen M. McNamee (born 1942) is an American attorney and jurist serving as a senior United States district judge of the United States District Court for the District of Arizona.

== Early life and education ==
Born in Cincinnati, Ohio, McNamee received a Bachelor of Arts degree from the University of Cincinnati in 1964 and a Master of Arts from the University of Arizona in 1967. He received a Juris Doctor from the University of Arizona College of Law in 1969.

== Career ==
He was an attorney in the Legal and Finance Department of the Florsheim Shoe Company from 1969 to 1971. He was an Assistant United States Attorney of the District of Arizona from 1971 to 1979. He was a Lecturer of the College of Business at the University of Arizona from 1975 to 1979. He was a First Assistant United States Attorney of District of Arizona in 1980. He was a Chief Assistant United States Attorney of District of Arizona from 1981 to 1985. He was the United States Attorney for the District of Arizona from 1985 to 1990.

McNamee was nominated by President George H. W. Bush on February 20, 1990, to a seat on the United States District Court for the District of Arizona vacated by Judge Charles Leach Hardy. He was confirmed by the United States Senate on May 11, 1990, and received his commission on June 4, 1990. He served as Chief Judge from 1999 to 2006. He assumed senior status on October 1, 2007.

== Sources ==
Legal offices
Preceded by Charles Leach Hardy	Judge of the United States District Court for the District of Arizona; 1990–2007	Succeeded by G. Murray Snow
Preceded by Robert C. Broomfield	Chief Judge of the United States District Court for the District of Arizona; 1999–2006	Succeeded by John Roll
