= Paul Gerhardt Rosenblatt =

American judge (1928–2019)

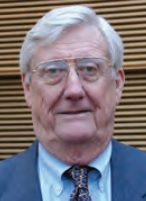

Senior Judge of the United States District Court for the District of Arizona
- In office October 30, 2003 – October 6, 2019

Judge of the United States District Court for the District of Arizona
- In office June 11, 1984 – October 30, 2003
- Appointed by: Ronald Reagan
- Preceded by: William Perry Copple
- Succeeded by: Neil V. Wake

Personal details
- Born: Paul Gerhardt Rosenblatt; April 4, 1928 Prescott, Arizona
- Died: October 6, 2019 (aged 91)
- Education: University of Arizona (A.B.); James E. Rogers College of Law (J.D.)

Paul Gerhardt Rosenblatt (April 4, 1928 – October 6, 2019) was a United States district judge of the United States District Court for the District of Arizona.

== Education and career ==
Born in Prescott, Arizona, Rosenblatt received an Artium Baccalaureus degree from the University of Arizona in 1958 and a Juris Doctor from the James E. Rogers College of Law at the University of Arizona in 1963. He was an assistant attorney general of Arizona from 1963 to 1966, and then an administrative assistant to United States Representative Sam Steiger from 1967 to 1972, before entering private practice in Prescott until 1973. He was the Presiding Judge of the Yavapai County Superior Court, Division One from 1973 to 1984.

== Federal judicial service ==
On May 15, 1984, President Ronald Reagan nominated Rosenblatt to a seat on the United States District Court for the District of Arizona vacated by Judge William Perry Copple. Rosenblatt was confirmed by the United States Senate on June 8, 1984, and received his commission on June 11, 1984. He assumed senior status on October 30, 2003. He died on October 6, 2019, aged 91.

== Sources ==
Legal offices
Preceded by William Perry Copple	Judge of the United States District Court for the District of Arizona; 1984–2003	Succeeded by Neil V. Wake
