= Neil V. Wake =

American judge (1948–2026)

Neil Vincent Wake

Senior Judge of the United States District Court for the District of Arizona
- In office July 5, 2016 – May 26, 2026

Judge of the United States District Court for the District of Arizona
- In office March 15, 2004 – July 5, 2016
- Appointed by: George W. Bush
- Preceded by: Paul Gerhardt Rosenblatt
- Succeeded by: Susan Brnovich

Personal details
- Born: Neil Vincent Wake; July 2, 1948 Phoenix, Arizona, U.S.
- Died: May 26, 2026 (aged 77) Phoenix, Arizona, U.S.
- Education: Arizona State University (BA); Harvard University (JD)

Neil Vincent Wake (July 2, 1948 – May 26, 2026) was an American jurist who served as a United States district judge of the United States District Court for the District of Arizona.

== Life and career ==
=== Early life and education ===
Born in Phoenix, Arizona, Wake received a Bachelor of Arts from Arizona State University in 1971 and a Juris Doctor from Harvard Law School in 1974. He was in private practice in Arizona from 1974 to 2004.

=== Federal judicial service ===
On October 22, 2003, Wake was nominated by President George W. Bush to the seat on the United States District Court for the District of Arizona vacated by Paul Gerhardt Rosenblatt. He was confirmed by the United States Senate on March 12, 2004, and received his commission three days later. He assumed senior status on July 5, 2016, serving in that role until his death on May 26, 2026.

Wake presided over a number of notable cases:

- In 2008, Wake upheld an Arizona law, the "Legal Arizona Workers Act", barring businesses from knowingly hiring illegal immigrants and providing for the revocation of business licenses for businesses who twice violated the law. The ruling rejected the arguments of business groups which had raised a constitutional challenge to the law, arguing that it infringed on the federal government's powers to regulate immigration matters. This ruling was affirmed by the U.S. Supreme Court in 2011, in the case of Chamber of Commerce v. Whiting.
- Also in 2008, Wake issued an order ordering Maricopa County, Arizona sheriff Joe Arpaio to remediate unconstitutional conditions in the county jail system that he oversaw, one of the nation's largest. Wake ordered that inmates in initial processing receive a bed or mattress and adequate food, rather than the moldy and rotten food that inmates had previously been served. Wake also ruled that the jails' treatment of mentally ill inmates caused "needless suffering and deterioration" and ordered the sheriff to ensure that such inmates receive prescribed medication.
- Wake oversaw the criminal case of a man who had defaced a thousand-year old, Native American petroglyph (the Descending Sheep Panel) at Glen Canyon National Recreation Area by carving his name into it. The man pleaded guilty in 2010 to damaging an archeological resource (a felony), and in 2011 Wake sentenced the man to pay $10,000 in restitution and complete 100 hours of community service.
- In 2013, Wake stayed the implementation of, and later overturned, an Arizona law that had attempted to bar Planned Parenthood and other health care clinics that perform abortions from receiving state funding for family planning and other health services offered by the organization and other groups. Wake ruled that the Arizona act, which had been signed into law by Governor Jan Brewer in 2012, "violates the freedom of choice provision of the Medicaid Act precisely because every Medicaid beneficiary has the right to select any qualified health care provider."
- Wake oversaw a civil proceeding instituted by the Equal Employment Opportunity Commission against the Cheesecake Factory. The EEOC had alleged that the restaurant chain had "allowing male kitchen staffers to sexually harass other male workers" in its Chandler, Arizona restaurant. In 2009, Wake issued a consent decree approving of a settlement in which the Cheesecake Factory did not admit any wrongdoing, but agreed to pay $345,000, to improve sexual harassment training, and to appoint an attorney ombudsman.

=== Death ===
Wake died in Phoenix on May 26, 2026, at the age of 77.

Legal offices
Preceded by Paul Gerhardt Rosenblatt	Judge of the United States District Court for the District of Arizona; 2004–2016	Succeeded by Susan Brnovich
