= William Perry Copple =

American judge

Senior Judge of the United States District Court for the District of Arizona
- In office November 30, 1983 – September 14, 2000

Judge of the United States District Court for the District of Arizona
- In office November 3, 1966 – November 30, 1983
- Appointed by: Lyndon B. Johnson
- Preceded by: Seat established by 80 Stat. 75
- Succeeded by: Paul Gerhardt Rosenblatt

Personal details
- Born: William Perry Copple; October 3, 1916 Holtville, California
- Died: September 14, 2000 (aged 83) Cottonwood, Arizona
- Education: Long Beach City College (AA); University of California, Berkeley (BA); UC Berkeley School of Law (JD)

William Perry Copple (October 3, 1916 – September 14, 2000) was a United States district judge of the United States District Court for the District of Arizona.

== Education and career ==
Born in Holtville, California, Copple received an Associate of Arts degree from Long Beach City College in 1934, a Bachelor of Arts degree from the University of California, Berkeley in 1948, and a Juris Doctor from the UC Berkeley School of Law in 1951. He was a self-employed contractor from 1945 to 1948 and from 1951 to 1952, entering private practice in Yuma, Arizona from 1952 to 1965. He was the United States Attorney for the District of Arizona from 1965 to 1966.

== Federal judicial service ==
On September 30, 1966, Copple was nominated by President Lyndon B. Johnson to a new seat on the United States District Court for the District of Arizona created by 80 Stat. 75. He was confirmed by the United States Senate on October 20, 1966, and received his commission on November 3, 1966. He assumed senior status on November 30, 1983, serving in that capacity until his death on September 14, 2000, in Cottonwood, Arizona.

== Sources ==
Legal offices
Preceded by Seat established by 80 Stat. 75	Judge of the United States District Court for the District of Arizona; 1966–1983	Succeeded by Paul Gerhardt Rosenblatt
