= Valdemar Aguirre Cordova =

American judge (1922–1988)

Judge of the United States District Court for the District of Arizona
- In office June 21, 1979 – June 18, 1988
- Appointed by: Jimmy Carter
- Preceded by: Seat established by 92 Stat. 1629
- Succeeded by: Seat abolished pursuant to 71 Stat. 586

Personal details
- Born: Valdemar Aguirre Cordova; December 6, 1922 Phoenix, Arizona
- Died: June 18, 1988 (aged 65)
- Education: James E. Rogers College of Law (JD)

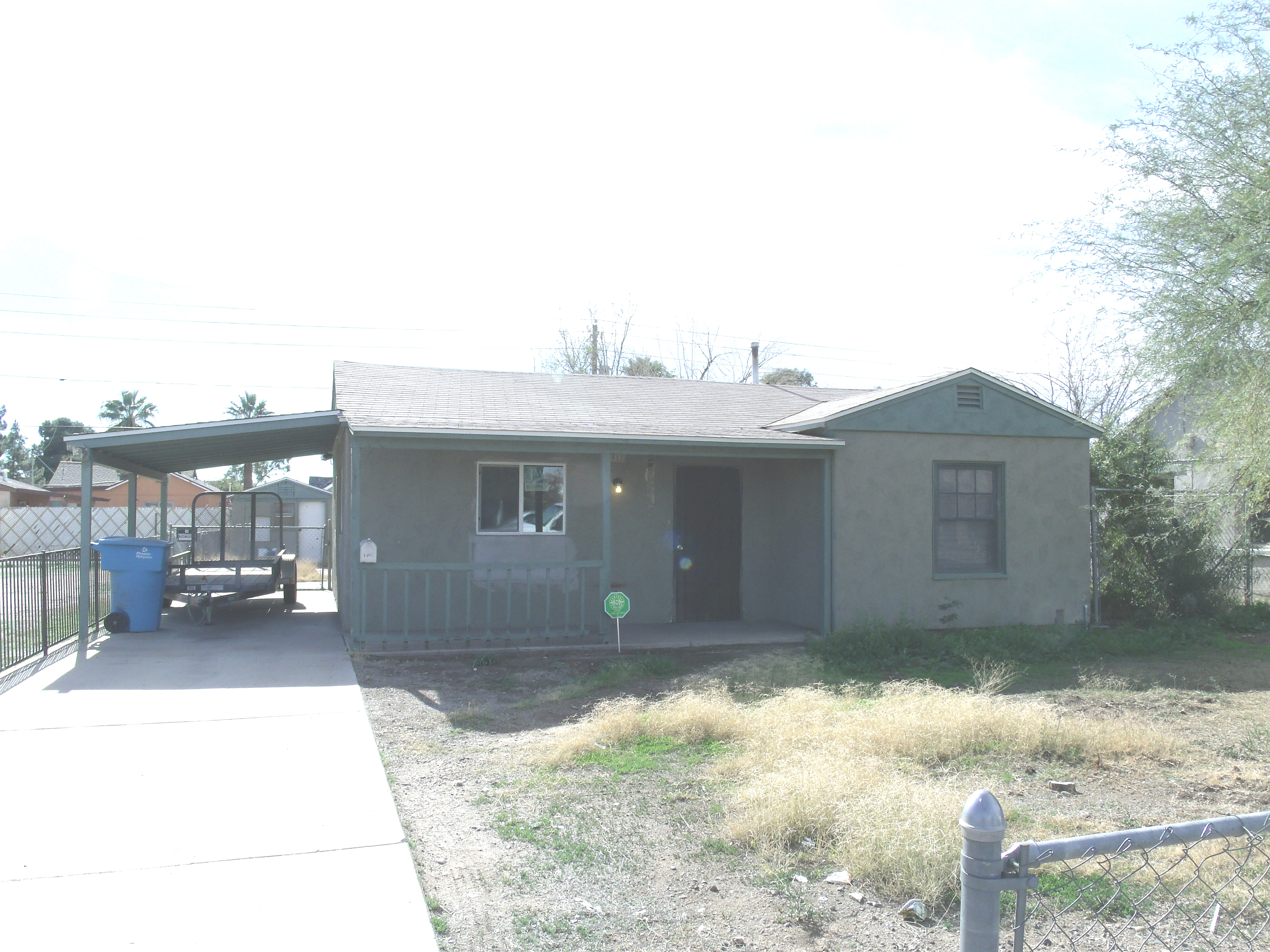
The house where Valdemar Aguirre Cordova resided and which is now known as the Valdemar Aguirre Cordova House was built in 1930 and is located at 1917 W Monte Vista Rd. This property is recognized as historic by the Hispanic American Historic Property Survey.

Valdemar Aguirre Cordova (December 6, 1922 – June 18, 1988) was a United States district judge of the United States District Court for the District of Arizona.

== Education and career ==
Born in Phoenix, Arizona, Cordova was in the United States Army during World War II, from 1940 to 1945. Serving in the United States Army Air Corps as a Lieutenant later in the war, he was shot down during a mission over Germany and captured. He subsequently spent 18 months in Stalag Luft I near Barth, Germany. After being liberated and discharged from the army, Cordova received a Juris Doctor from the James E. Rogers College of Law at the University of Arizona in 1950. He was in private practice in Phoenix from 1950 to 1965. He was a superior court judge in Maricopa County, Arizona from 1965 to 1967, and from 1976 to 1979, returning in the interim to private practice in Phoenix.

== Federal judicial service ==
On April 30, 1979, Cordova was nominated by President Jimmy Carter to a new seat on the United States District Court for the District of Arizona created by 92 Stat. 1629. He was confirmed by the United States Senate on June 19, 1979, and received his commission on June 21, 1979. On or about April 20, 1984, President Ronald Reagan certified Cordova involuntarily as disabled pursuant to the act of September 2, 1957, 71 Stat. 586, which entitled the president to appoint an additional judge for the court and provided that no successor to the judge certified as disabled be appointed. The certification was due to the effect of a serious stroke Cordova suffered earlier in 1984. Robert C. Broomfield was appointed to the additional judgeship. Due to his involuntary certification of disability, Cordova ceased to perform any judicial duties, but continued to remain in active judicial status until his death.

== Death ==
Cordova died on June 18, 1988, from continuing complications of his 1984 stroke.

== Scholarship ==
On March 1, 2018, the University of Arizona announced the creation of the Honorable Judge Valdemar Aguirre Cordova Scholarship, created by a $100,000 gift from the Arizona Hispanic Bar Association. The scholarship will be available to students studying law at the University of Arizona.

== See also ==
- List of Hispanic and Latino American jurists

== Sources ==
Legal offices
Preceded by Seat established by 92 Stat. 1629	Judge of the United States District Court for the District of Arizona; 1979–1988	Succeeded by Seat abolished under the provisions of 71 Stat. 586
