= Michael T. Liburdi =

American judge (born 1977)

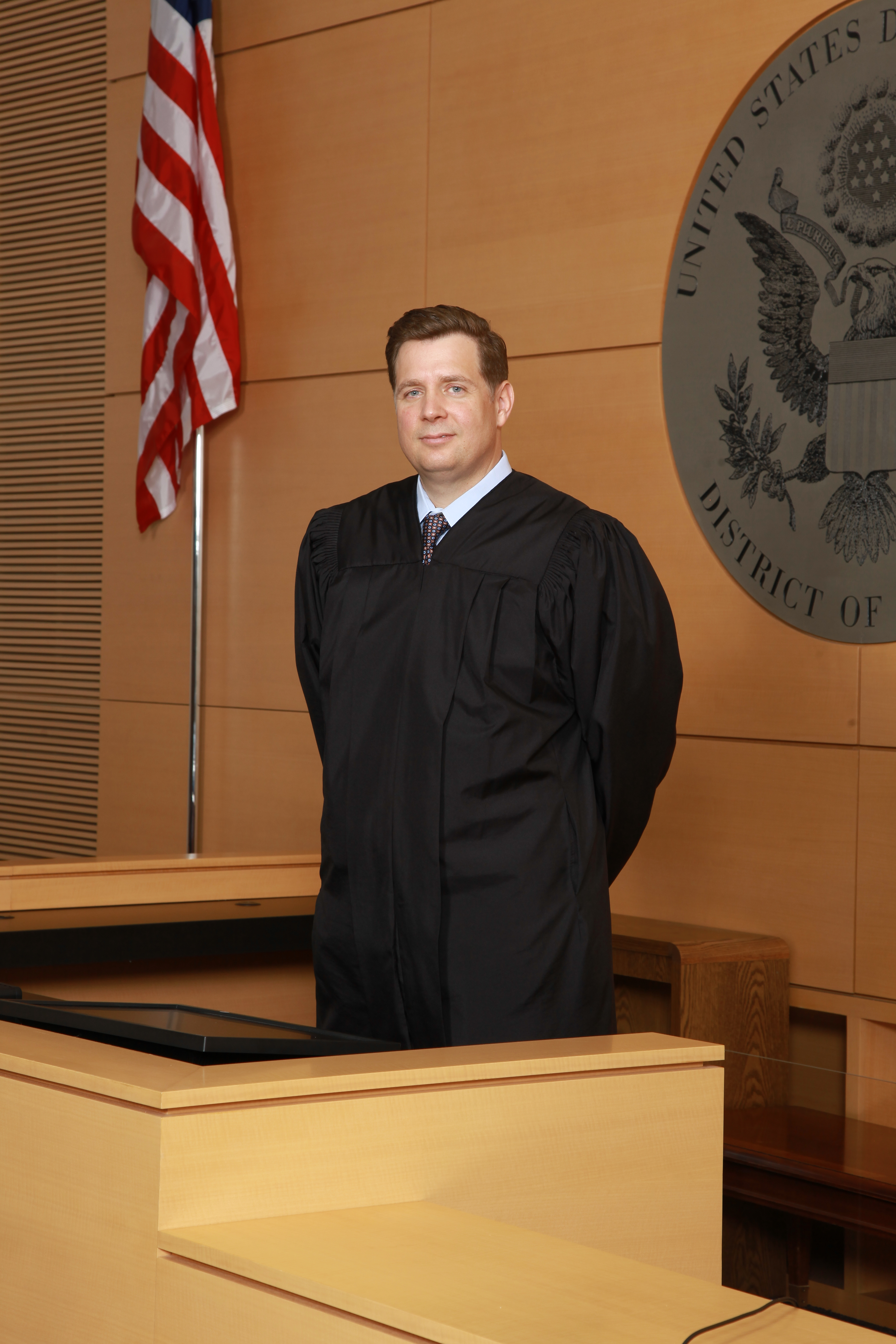

Judge of the United States District Court for the District of Arizona
- Incumbent
- Assumed office August 5, 2019
- Appointed by: Donald Trump
- Preceded by: David G. Campbell

Personal details
- Born: 1977 (age 48–49) Scranton, Pennsylvania, U.S.
- Education: Arizona State University (BS, JD)

Michael Thomas Liburdi (born 1977) is a United States district judge of the United States District Court for the District of Arizona.

== Education ==
Liburdi received his Bachelor of Science, summa cum laude, from Arizona State University and his Juris Doctor, magna cum laude, from the Sandra Day O'Connor College of Law at Arizona State University.

== Career ==
After graduating from law school, Liburdi served as a law clerk to Vice Chief Justice Ruth McGregor of the Arizona Supreme Court. Following his clerkship, he joined the Phoenix office of Perkins Coie as an associate. In 2008, Liburdi spent a year working for the Federal Election Commission in Washington, D.C. as a Litigation Staff Attorney. In 2011, Liburdi joined the Phoenix office of Snell & Wilmer where he was a partner for five years. He later served as general counsel to Arizona governor Doug Ducey. From 2018 to 2019, he was a shareholder in the Phoenix office of Greenberg Traurig, where he served as chair of the Phoenix litigation practice. His practice focused on complex commercial and constitutional litigation, as well as campaign finance and election procedure compliance. Liburdi also served as an adjunct professor of law at the Sandra Day O'Connor College of Law at Arizona State University, where he taught election law from 2010 to 2016.

=== Federal judicial service ===
On January 16, 2019, President Donald Trump announced his intent to nominate Liburdi to serve as a United States district judge for the United States District Court for the District of Arizona. On January 17, 2019, his nomination was sent to the Senate. Trump nominated Liburdi to the seat vacated by judge David G. Campbell, who assumed senior status on July 31, 2018. On February 13, 2019, a hearing on his nomination was held before the Senate Judiciary Committee On March 7, 2019, his nomination was reported out of committee by a 12–10 vote. On July 29, 2019, the United States Senate invoked cloture on his nomination by a 51–37 vote. On July 30, 2019, his nomination was confirmed by a 53–37 vote. He received his judicial commission on August 5, 2019.

== Memberships ==
Liburdi is a member of several national and Phoenix-based organizations. Locally, Liburdi served as Commissioner for the Arizona Commission on the Arts from 2010 to 2016. He has also been a member of the Arizona State Governing Committee for Deferred Compensation Plans. Nationally, Liburdi has served as Commissioner for the State of Arizona with the Uniform Laws Commission from 2016 to 2021. He also has been a member of the Federalist Society since 2005.

Legal offices
Preceded by David G. Campbell	Judge of the United States District Court for the District of Arizona; 2019–present	Incumbent
