= James A. Soto =

American judge (born 1950)

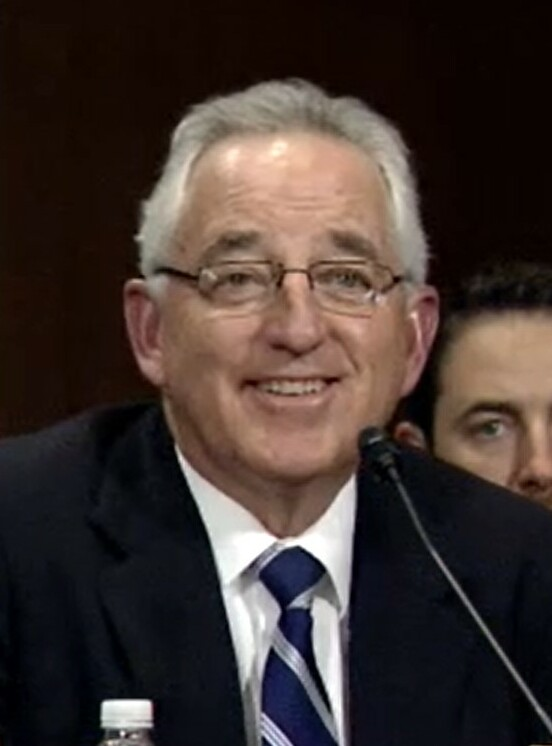
- Soto in 2014

Senior Judge of the United States District Court for the District of Arizona
- Incumbent
- Assumed office July 1, 2024

Judge of the United States District Court for the District of Arizona
- In office June 9, 2014 – July 1, 2024
- Appointed by: Barack Obama
- Preceded by: David C. Bury
- Succeeded by: Angela M. Martinez

Judge of the Santa Cruz County Superior Court
- In office 2001–2014

Personal details
- Born: July 1, 1950 (age 75) Nogales, Arizona, U.S.
- Party: Democratic
- Education: Arizona State University (BS, JD)

James Alan Soto (born July 1, 1950) is a senior United States district judge of the United States District Court for the District of Arizona and former Arizona state court judge.

== Biography ==
Soto received a Bachelor of Science degree in 1971 from Arizona State University. He received a Juris Doctor in 1975 from Arizona State University College of Law. From 1975 to 1976, he worked in the law office of Nasib Karam. From 1976 to 1979, he was a sole practitioner of law. From 1979 to 1992, he was associated with various law partnerships. From 1992 to 2001, he was a shareholder of Soto, Martin and Coogan, P.C. Concurrently with his private practice, he held a number of public positions. From 1975 to 1983, he worked as a part-time deputy city attorney in the Office of the Nogales City Attorney. He worked as a part-time town attorney in Patagonia, Arizona in from 1975 to 1992. He worked as a part-time deputy county attorney for the Santa Cruz County Attorney's Office in 1979. From 2001 to 2014, Soto served on the Superior Court in Santa Cruz County, where he also served as presiding superior court judge. Soto was elected to the bench as a Democrat.

=== Federal judicial service ===
On December 19, 2013, President Barack Obama nominated Soto to serve as a United States district judge of the United States District Court for the District of Arizona, to the seat vacated by Judge David C. Bury, who assumed senior status on December 31, 2012. On February 27 2014, his nomination was reported out of the committee. On May 13, 2014, Senate Majority Leader Harry Reid filed for cloture on his nomination. On May 15, 2014, United States Senate invoked cloture on his nomination by a 61–35 vote. Later that same day, his nomination was confirmed by a 93–1 vote. He received his judicial commission on June 9, 2014. He assumed senior status on July 1, 2024.

== See also ==
- List of Hispanic and Latino American jurists

Legal offices
Preceded by David C. Bury	Judge of the United States District Court for the District of Arizona; 2014–2024	Succeeded by Angela M. Martinez
