= David G. Campbell =

American judge (born 1952)

David Grant Campbell
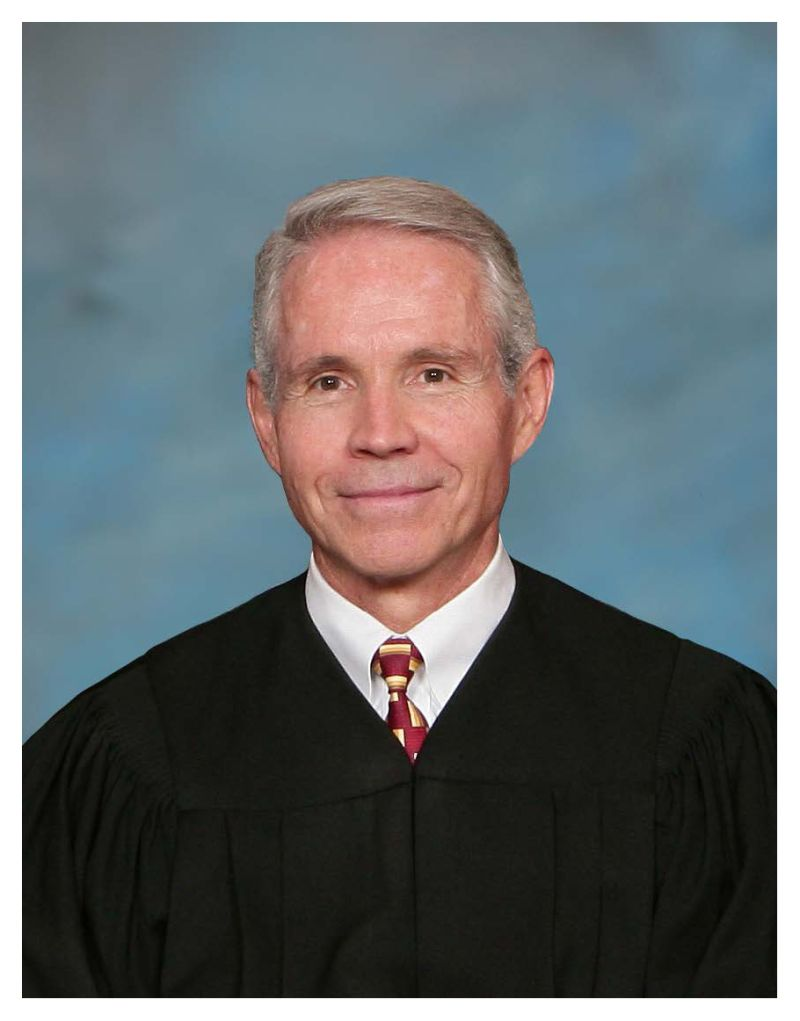
- Campbell in 2015

Senior Judge of the United States District Court for the District of Arizona
- Incumbent
- Assumed office July 31, 2018

Judge of the United States District Court for the District of Arizona
- In office July 15, 2003 – July 31, 2018
- Appointed by: George W. Bush
- Preceded by: Seat established by 116 Stat. 1758
- Succeeded by: Michael T. Liburdi

Personal details
- Born: David Grant Campbell; December 6, 1952 (age 73) Salt Lake City, Utah, U.S.
- Spouse: Stacey Campbell
- Education: University of Utah (BS, JD)

David Grant Campbell (born December 6, 1952) is a senior United States district judge of the United States District Court for the District of Arizona.

== Early life and education ==
Born in Salt Lake City, Utah, Campbell received a Bachelor of Science degree from the University of Utah in 1976 and a Juris Doctor from the S.J. Quinney College of Law at the University of Utah in 1979.

== Career ==
Campbell served as a law clerk to Judge J. Clifford Wallace of the United States Court of Appeals for the Ninth Circuit from 1979 to 1980, and to Associate Justice William H. Rehnquist of the Supreme Court of the United States for the 1982 Term. He worked in private practice in the interim year, and returned to private practice in 1982, working most notably at Osborn Maledon in Phoenix, Arizona. Outside of formal legal practice, Campbell served as an adjunct professor of law at the Arizona State University College of Law, and as a visiting professor of law at Brigham Young University Law School, where he was named professor of the year in 1990.

=== Federal judicial service ===
Campbell was nominated to serve as judge of the United States District Court for the District of Arizona by President George W. Bush on March 13, 2003, to a new seat created by 116 Stat. 1758. The United States Senate confirmed him on July 8, 2003 by 92–0 vote. He received his commission on July 15, 2003. Judge Campbell was a member of the Advisory Committee on Federal Rules of Civil Procedure from 2005 to 2011, and chaired the committee from 2011 to 2015, while the Advisory Committee approved important changes to discovery-related rules that ultimately became effective in December 2015. From 2016 to 2020, Judge Campbell chaired the Committee on Rules of Practice and Procedure for the federal courts, which oversees the Civil, Criminal, Appellate, Bankruptcy, and Evidence advisory committees. Judge Campbell currently serves as chair of the federal courts' Committee on International Judicial Relations. He assumed senior status on July 31, 2018.

Judge Campbell has worked with the courts of Botswana, Namibia, South Africa, and other countries on judicial case management.

He is a member of the American Law Institute and a Fellow of the American Bar Foundation.

== Personal ==
Campbell is a member of the Church of Jesus Christ of Latter-day Saints (LDS Church). He served as a LDS missionary in the England Birmingham Mission and has been a bishop in the LDS Church. Campbell and his wife Stacey are parents to three daughters and two sons.

== See also ==
- List of law clerks for the ninth seat of the Supreme Court of the United States

Legal offices
Preceded by Seat established by 116 Stat. 1758	Judge of the United States District Court for the District of Arizona; 2003–2018	Succeeded by Michael T. Liburdi
