= Douglas L. Rayes =

American judge (born 1952)

Senior Judge of the United States District Court for the District of Arizona
- Incumbent
- Assumed office June 1, 2024

Judge of the United States District Court for the District of Arizona
- In office May 28, 2014 – June 1, 2024
- Appointed by: Barack Obama
- Preceded by: Frederick J. Martone
- Succeeded by: Krissa M. Lanham

Personal details
- Born: 1952 (age 73–74) Globe, Arizona, U.S.
- Education: Arizona State University (BSE, JD)

Douglas Leroy Rayes (born 1952) is a senior United States district judge of the United States District Court for the District of Arizona.

== Biography ==
Rayes received a Bachelor of Science in Engineering degree, summa cum laude, in 1975 from Arizona State University. He received a Juris Doctor, cum laude, in 1978 from the Arizona State University College of Law. He served in the Army Judge Advocate General's Corps, from 1979 to 1982. From 1982 to 1984, he was an associate at the law firm of McGroder, Pearlstein, Pepler & Tryon. From 1984 to 2000, he was a partner at that law firm which was named Tryon, Heller & Rayes at the time of his departure. From 2000 to 2014, he served as a Judge of the Maricopa County Superior Court. During his tenure on the bench, he presided over a wide range of cases, including civil, criminal and family law matters.

=== Consideration for Arizona Supreme Court ===
In August 2012, Rayes was one of three finalists recommended to Governor Jan Brewer to fill a vacancy on the Arizona Supreme Court. Brewer ultimately appointed Ann Scott Timmer to the court.

=== Federal judicial service ===
On September 19, 2013, President Barack Obama nominated Rayes to serve as a United States district judge of the United States District Court for the District of Arizona, to the seat vacated by Judge Frederick J. Martone, who assumed senior status on January 30, 2013. Rayes, a Republican, was one of four Arizona judicial nominees announced by Obama that day who were chosen in consultation with Republican Senators John McCain and Jeff Flake. On February 27, 2014 his nomination was reported out of the committee. On May 13, 2014, Senate Majority Leader Harry Reid filed for cloture on his nomination. On May 15, 2014, The Senate voted 59–35 to invoke cloture on his nomination. Later that same day, the Senate confirmed him by a 77–19 vote. Rayes received his judicial commission on May 28, 2014. He assumed senior status on June 1, 2024.

Legal offices
Preceded by Frederick J. Martone	Judge of the United States District Court for the District of Arizona; 2014–2024	Succeeded by Krissa M. Lanham
