= Fennemore Craig =

American regional law firm

Fennemore Craig, P.C.
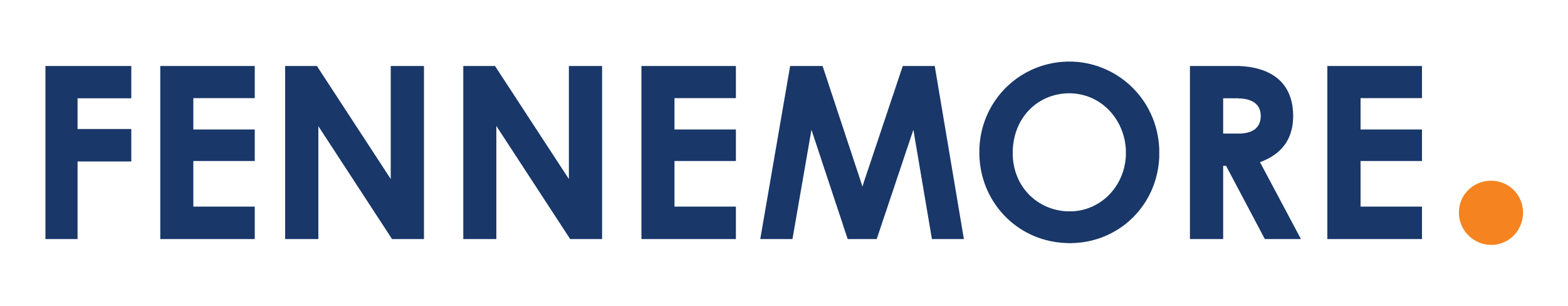
- Headquarters: Phoenix, Arizona
- No. of offices: 17
- Key people: James Goodnow, President & CEO; Management Committee: Kim Arana, Leigh Burnside, Craig Etem, Todd Kartchner, Susan Wissink, James Goodnow, Sarah Strunk, Chair, Board of Directors; Bruce Dahl, Denver Office Managing Partner; Leigh Burnside, Fresno Office Managing Partner; Richard Dreitzer, Las Vegas Office Managing Partner; Daniel Arana, Nogales Office Managing Partner; Stacie Smith, Phoenix Office Managing Partner; Craig Etem, Reno Office Managing Partner George Krauja, Tucson Office Managing Partner
- Date founded: 1885
- Website: fennemorelaw.com

Fennemore Craig, P.C. is a Mountain West regional law firm that offers clients legal services in both litigation and commercial transactions.

The firm offers clients legal services in financial restructuring, bankruptcy, creditors' rights, commercial litigation, estate planning, government relations, intellectual property, etc.

Fennemore Craig is one of the oldest law firms in the Mountain West and the oldest law firm in Arizona, first established in Phoenix in the Arizona Territory in 1885. In 2008, the firm was listed number 220 in The National Law Journal 250 (NLJ 250), a list of largest U.S. law firms by number of lawyers.

== History ==
Sloan went on to serve as Associate Justice of the Arizona Territorial Supreme Court and as the 17th and final Governor of the Arizona Territory. As Governor, he oversaw Arizona's transition from territory to statehood.

When Arizona became a state in 1912, Edward Kent joined the firm after serving on the Territorial Supreme Court. Kent authored the "Kent's Decree", which established water rights for nearly all of the Salt and Verde River systems. The "Kent's Decree" stood the test of time and still governs water rights in Central Arizona after seven decades.

Harry Fennemore joined the firm in 1916. Fennemore drafted Arizona's workmen's compensation law and sales tax act. Fennemore also brought with him as a client the Mountain States Telephone and Telegraph Company, the successor of which the firm represents to this day. For over a century, Fennemore Craig has been involved in the development of Arizona's telecommunications system through policy-making and shaping administrative regulation of communications companies.

Jubal Early Craig and Virgil Bledsoe joined the firm in 1927. Craig helped organize the State Bar of Arizona, contributed to the writing of the Federal Rules of Civil Procedure, and helped form the Maricopa County Legal Aid Society.

Jubal Craig's son, Walter Craig, joined the firm in 1936. While with the firm, Walter served as the president of the Arizona Bar Association and, in 1963, became president of the American Bar Association. Craig also served as special counsel to the Warren Commission, which investigated the assassination of President John F. Kennedy. In 1963, following his service to the Warren Commission, he served as a judge on the United States District Court for the District of Arizona until his death in 1986. The State Bar of Arizona's Walter E. Craig Distinguished Service Award is named after Mr. Craig. It is awarded to the attorney who has manifested adherence to the highest principles and tradition of the legal profession and service to the public in the community in which he/she lives. The following Fennemore Craig attorneys have received this award: Philip E. Von Ammon – 1988; Calvin H. Udall – 1993; Kenneth Sherk – 1999; and Neal Kurn – 2014.

Phillip Von Ammon, who joined the firm after serving as counsel to one of the firm's major clients, the AT&SF railroad. Von Ammon subsequently served as president of the Arizona Bar Association and as the firm's managing partner for many years.

Between 1954 and 1962, Calvin Udall served as the attorney for Arizona in the titanic legal and political battle between Arizona and California for control of Colorado River water. Mr. Udall was part of Arizona's legal team in 1963 when the United States Supreme Court allocated the rights to Colorado River water. Without Colorado River water, growth of Arizona's major cities, particularly Phoenix, would never have materialized. Mr. Udall also was a tireless supporter of diversity in the legal profession, chairing the American Bar Association Task Force on Minorities in the Legal Profession, which issued its report in 1986, highlighting the lack of opportunities for minorities as lawyers and judges. He later served with a small group of legislators, judges and lawyers as the Ad Hoc Committee for Minority Opportunities in the Arizona Judiciary, which subsequently became the Commission on Minority Opportunities in the Arizona Judiciary through an Administrative Order of the Arizona Supreme Court in 1990.

Continuing the firm's insistence on water issues facing the Southwest, Jim Johnson was the principal negotiator and drafter of the Arizona Groundwater Management Act, which was vital to balancing the growth in Arizona with the available water supply. Without the sustainable water supply that resulted from the state's Groundwater Management Act, growth in Arizona would have slowed decades ago.

In 1957, John O'Connor joined the firm. He met his future wife, Sandra Day, while they served as editors of the Stanford Law Review. Sandra Day O'Connor went on to serve as the first female justice of the United States Supreme Court. When Justice O'Connor was nominated for the Supreme Court in 1981, she relied on attorneys from the firm to help her prepare for her confirmation hearings. When Justice O'Connor joined the Supreme Court in September 1981, she hired Fennemore Craig attorney, Ruth McGregor as her first law clerk.

In 1974, Fennemore Craig hired its first two female attorneys, Ruth McGregor and Toni McClory. The firm subsequently became one of the first law firms in Arizona to elect females as shareholders. Ms. McGregor later served 11 years as a justice of the Arizona Supreme Court. Justice McGregor served as an associate justice until 2005, when she became the court's second female chief justice. Ms. McClory went on to serve as an Arizona Assistant Attorney General from 1976 to 1991.

The firm expanded into Tucson in October 1989 and then into Nogales in September 1999 with the addition of Kim and Hector Arana and a robust cross-border trade practice. Fennemore Craig opened a Las Vegas office in September 2006, welcoming attorneys from Morse and Mowbray, and later that year, it opened an office in Denver with the addition of intellectual property attorneys from the Dahl firm.

In July 2012, the firm welcomed 25 attorneys from Jones Vargas, a law firm with offices in Las Vegas and Reno, Nevada. The Jones Vargas roster over the years has included governors, state senators, state assembly representatives, state bar governors and presidents, governors of the American Bar Association, and community leaders. Ann Morgan now serves on the State Bar of Nevada Board of Governors.

Upon the addition of the Jones Vargas lawyers in Las Vegas and Reno, Fennemore Craig established an even larger presence in the Mountain West; doubling the size of its Denver office in 2014, with the addition of 13 health care litigators.

In 2015, Fennemore Craig embarked upon its 130-year anniversary and added 19 lawyers in the Las Vegas and Reno offices from the prominent Lionel Sawyer & Collins firm. The arrival of the Lionel Sawyers lawyers included the legendary Sam Lionel, who co-founded the Lionel Sawyer firm in 1967 with former Nevada Governor Grant Sawyer, who has since passed away.

Fennemore Craig is among the 250 largest law firms in the nation.

== Mergers and acquisitions ==
In August 2020, Fennemore Craig PC announced its merger with California-based Dowling Aaron.

Fennemore merged with Seattle-based Savitt Bruce & Willey in early February 2024. That same month, the company also announced its acquisition of Sacramento-based tax firm Wagner Kirkman Blaine Klomparens & Youmans LLP.

== History of name changes ==
Since its founding in 1885, Fennemore Craig has undergone the following name changes:

- 1885, Sloan & Chalmers
- 1889: Jamieson & Chalmers
- 1902: Chalmers & Wilkinson
- 1912: Chalmers & Kent
- 1915: Chalmers, Kent & Stahl
- 1918: Chalmers, Stahl, Fennemore & Longan
- 1927: Chalmers, Fennemore & Nairn
- 1934: Chalmers & Fennemore
- 1935: Fennemore, Craig, Allen & Bledsoe
- 1955: Fennemore, Craig, Allen & McClennen
- 1968: Fennemore, Craig, von Ammon, McClennen & Udall
- 1969: Fennemore, Craig, von Ammon & Udall
- 1982: Fennemore, Craig, von Ammon, Udall & Powers
- 1987: Fennemore Craig A Professional Corporation
- 2004: Fennemore Craig, P.C.
- 2020: Fennemore & Fennemore Dowling Aaron

The firm's namesakes, Harry Fennemore and Jubal Early Craig, teamed up with the law firm in 1912 and 1927, respectively.

== Practice Areas ==
Fennemore is a full service law firm with the following practice areas:

- Agribusiness
- Blockchain & Cryptocurrency
- Business & Finance
- Business Litigation
- Construction Law
- Emerging Businesses & Technologies
- Employment & Labor
- ERISA/Employee Benefits
- Estate Litigation
- Estate Planning
- Family Office & Private Client Attorneys
- Financial Restructuring, Bankruptcy & Creditors' Rights
- Funeral & Cemetery Law
- Gaming & Hospitality
- Government Relations & Regulatory
- Health Care Litigation & Regulation
- Intellectual Property & IP Litigation
- Mining Law & Public Lands
- Natural Resources, Energy & Environmental
- Plaintiffs' Personal Injury
- Privacy & Data Security
- Professional Liability
- Real Estate
- Tax Law
- Trusts & Estates

== Recognition ==
Fennemore Craig has 82 attorneys recognized as Best Lawyers in America, 81 Super Lawyers, and 75 rated as AV lawyers by Martindale-Hubbell and nine "Litigation Stars" rated by Benchmark Litigation. The firm was recognized as a "2017 Top Ranked Law Firm" for having more than one in three lawyers with an AV Preeminent Peer Review Rating. The firm has 19 shareholders recognized in Chambers & Partners legal directory.
