= Charles Andrew Muecke =

American judge (1918–2007)

Senior Judge of the United States District Court for the District of Arizona
- In office November 30, 1984 – September 21, 2007

Chief Judge of the United States District Court for the District of Arizona
- In office 1979–1984
- Preceded by: Walter Early Craig
- Succeeded by: Richard Bilby

Judge of the United States District Court for the District of Arizona
- In office October 1, 1964 – November 30, 1984
- Appointed by: Lyndon B. Johnson
- Preceded by: David W. Ling
- Succeeded by: Roger Gordon Strand

Personal details
- Born: Charles Andrew Muecke; February 20, 1918 New York City, New York, U.S.
- Died: September 21, 2007 (aged 89) Flagstaff, Arizona, U.S.
- Education: College of William & Mary (BA); James E. Rogers College of Law (LLB)

Charles Andrew Muecke (February 20, 1918 – September 21, 2007) was a United States district judge of the United States District Court for the District of Arizona.

== Education and career ==
Born in New York City, New York, Muecke received a Bachelor of Arts degree from the College of William & Mary in 1941 and a Bachelor of Laws from the James E. Rogers College of Law at the University of Arizona in 1953. He was a United States Marine Corps Major during World War II, from 1942 to 1946, and remained at that rank in the United States Marine Corps Reserve until 1950. Because of his excellent German, he was tapped by the Office of Strategic Services (the precursor to the Central Intelligence Agency) to go to France, where he worked with German defectors to return to Germany to spy on the Nazi regime. He was in private practice in Phoenix, Arizona from 1953 to 1961, becoming the United States Attorney for the District of Arizona from 1961 to 1964.

== Federal judicial service ==
On August 17, 1964, Muecke was nominated by President Lyndon B. Johnson to a seat on the United States District Court for the District of Arizona vacated by Judge David W. Ling. Muecke was confirmed by the United States Senate on September 29, 1964, and received his commission on October 1, 1964. He served as Chief Judge from 1979 to 1984, assuming senior status on November 30, 1984. He continued to serve in that capacity until his death on September 21, 2007, in Flagstaff, Arizona.

== Sources ==
Legal offices
| Preceded by David W. Ling | Judge of the United States District Court for the District of Arizona; 1964–1984 | Succeeded by Roger Gordon Strand |
| Preceded by Walter Early Craig | Chief Judge of the United States District Court for the District of Arizona; 1979–1984 | Succeeded by Richard Bilby |
