= Charles Leach Hardy =

American judge (1919–2010)

Senior Judge of the United States District Court for the District of Arizona
- In office June 2, 1990 – December 24, 2010

Judge of the United States District Court for the District of Arizona
- In office May 23, 1980 – June 2, 1990
- Appointed by: Jimmy Carter
- Preceded by: Walter Early Craig
- Succeeded by: Stephen M. McNamee

Personal details
- Born: Charles Leach Hardy; January 24, 1919 Los Angeles, California, U.S.
- Died: December 24, 2010 (aged 91) Tempe, Arizona, U.S.
- Education: University of Arizona (BS); James E. Rogers College of Law (LLB)

Charles Leach Hardy (January 24, 1919 – December 24, 2010) was a United States district judge of the United States District Court for the District of Arizona.

== Education and career ==
Born in Los Angeles, California, Hardy was a Captain in the United States Army Field Artillery during World War II, from 1941 to 1946. He received a Bachelor of Science degree from the University of Arizona in 1947 and a Bachelor of Laws from the James E. Rogers College of Law at the University of Arizona in 1950. He was in private practice in Phoenix, Arizona from 1949 to 1952. He was a deputy county attorney of Maricopa County, Arizona from 1952 to 1955, entering private practice in Scottsdale, Arizona in 1956. He was an assistant state attorney general of Arizona from 1957 to 1959, returning to private practice in Phoenix from 1959 to 1966. He was a judge of the Superior Court of Maricopa County, Arizona from 1967 to 1980.

== Federal judicial service ==
On April 2, 1980, Hardy was nominated by President Jimmy Carter to a seat on the United States District Court for the District of Arizona vacated by Judge Walter Early Craig. Hardy was confirmed by the United States Senate on May 21, 1980, and received his commission on May 23, 1980. He assumed senior status on June 2, 1990. He died on December 24, 2010, in Tempe, Arizona.

== Sources ==
Legal offices
Preceded by Walter Early Craig	Judge of the United States District Court for the District of Arizona; 1980–1990	Succeeded by Stephen M. McNamee
