= Federal Medical Center, Rochester =

United States federal medical prison

Coordinates: 44°01′27.36″N 92°26′10.65″W

Federal Medical Center, Rochester (FMC Rochester)
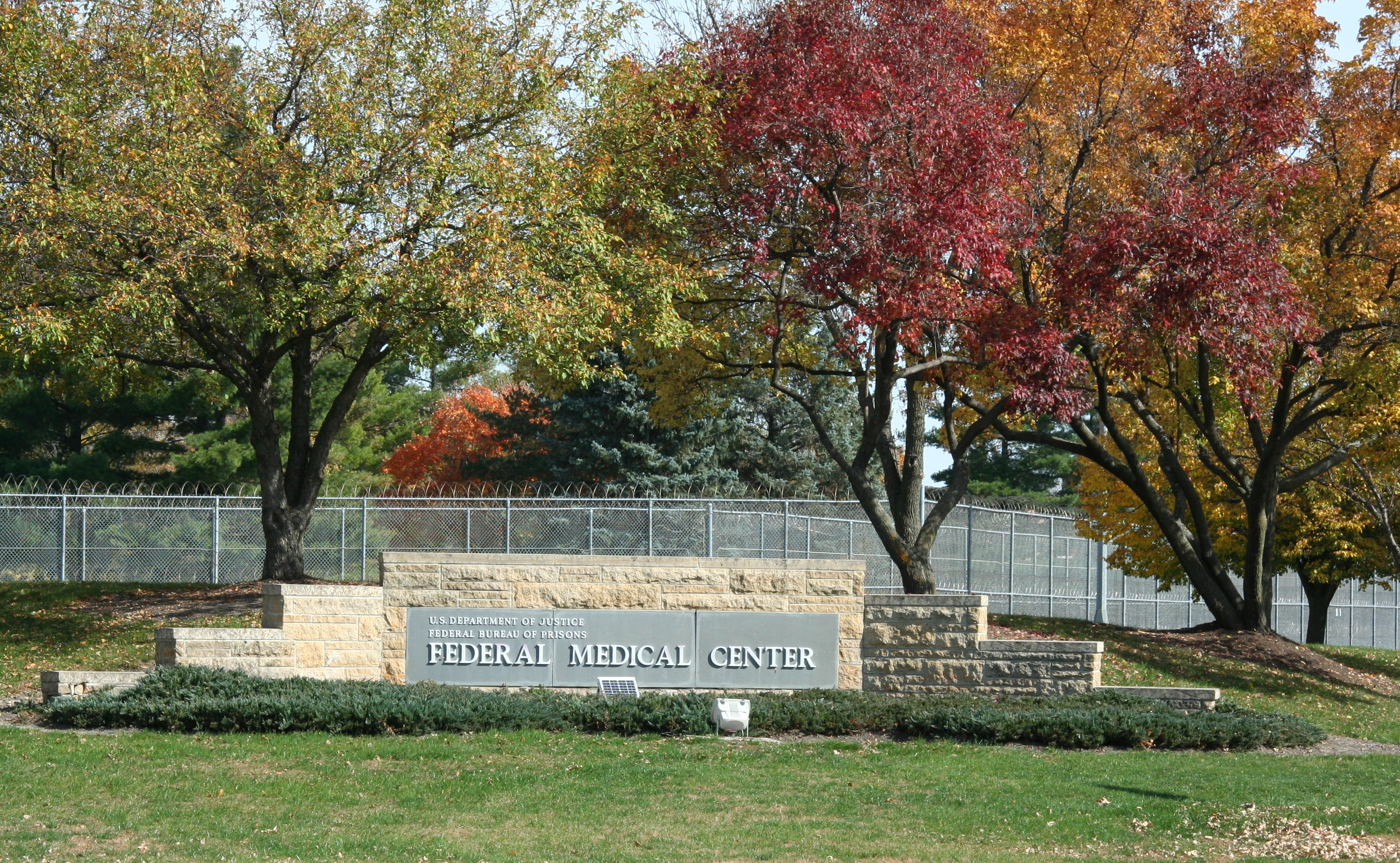
- Interactive map of Federal Medical Center, Rochester (FMC Rochester)
- Location: Rochester, Minnesota, U.S.
- Status: Operational
- Security class: Medical
- Population: 786 (July 13, 2024)
- Opened: 1984
- Managed by: Federal Bureau of Prisons
- Warden: Jared Rardin
- Website: www.bop.gov/locations/institutions/rch/

The Federal Medical Center, Rochester (FMC Rochester) is a United States federal prison in Minnesota for male inmates requiring specialized or long-term medical or mental health care. It is designated as an administrative facility, which means it holds inmates of all security classifications. It is operated by the Federal Bureau of Prisons, a division of the United States Department of Justice.

FMC Rochester is located in southeastern Minnesota, 2 miles (3.2 km) east of downtown Rochester.

== Facility ==
FMC Rochester is one of six medical referral centers within the Federal Bureau of Prisons. Health Services staff at FMC include physicians, a dentist, dental assistants, nurse practitioners, physician assistants, nurses, pharmacists, pharmacy technicians, a radiological technician, physical therapists, laboratory technologists and a respiratory therapist. Mental Health Services through the Psychiatry and Psychology Departments are available to all inmates. These include educational groups, therapy groups, individual therapy, intensive diagnosis/assessment, and inpatient treatment. In addition, outpatient substance abuse treatment services are available.

In 2009, Philip Fornaci, the director of the DC Prisoners' Project, stated that Rochester, along with FMC Butner and FMC Carswell, "are clearly the "gold standard" in terms of what BOP facilities can achieve in providing medical care" and that they had provided "excellent medical care, sometimes for extremely complex medical needs."

== Notable incidents ==
In July 2009, Richard Torres, a correction officer at FMC Rochester, was indicted for smuggling contraband into the facility for an inmate in exchange for thousands of dollars in bribes. The contraband included cellular telephones, tobacco and creatine powder. Torres was terminated. Two months later, he pleaded guilty to soliciting a bribe and he was sentenced to one year in federal prison.

== Notable inmates ==
=== Current ===
Inmate Name	Register Number	Photo	Status	Details
Jared Lee Loughner	15213-196		Serving 7 life sentences without parole plus 140 years.	Perpetrator of the 2011 Tucson shooting in Arizona; pleaded guilty in 2012 to the attempted assassination of U.S. Representative Gabby Giffords and the murder of six people, including U.S. District Judge John Roll.
Luke Helder	36460-048		Currently being held indefinitely.	Accused of planting homemade pipe bombs in mailboxes in five Midwestern states in 2002; ruled incompetent to stand trial in 2004.
Ray Holmberg	84357-510		Serving a 10-year sentence; set to be released on January 23, 2033.	Former North Dakota state senator and longest-serving state legislator in the United States; pleaded guilty to charges related to child sex tourism in 2024.
Ming Sen Shiue	00499-041		Serving a life sentence with the possibility of parole.	Kidnapped Mary Stauffer and her daughter Elizabeth. Also serving a 40-year sentence on state murder charges for killing a 6-year-old boy who witnessed the crime. Shiue was detained indefinitely as a dangerous sexual predator in 2010.

=== Former ===
Inmate Name	Register Number	Photo	Status	Details
Jim Bakker	07407-058		Served 5 years; released from custody on December 1, 1994.	Founder of Praise the Lord (PTL) Ministries; convicted of fraud in 1989 for stealing millions of dollars in donations from his members.
Sol Wachtler	32571-054		Served 11 months; released from custody on October 26, 1994.	Former Chief Judge of the New York Court of Appeals; pleaded guilty in 1992 to sending messages to his ex-mistress threatening to kidnap her 14-year-old daughter in retaliation for her ending their affair.
Lyndon LaRouche	15204-083		Served 5 years; released from custody on January 26, 1994.	Three-time presidential candidate; convicted in 1988 of scheming to defraud the IRS and deliberately defaulting on more than $30 million in loans from his supporters.
Miles J. Jones	20907-045		Served 18 months; released from custody on August 26, 2010.	Forensic pathologist-physician convicted of income-tax evasion.
Sheikh Omar Abdel-Rahman	34892-054		Transferred to FMC Butner, where he died on February 18, 2017.	Muslim cleric convicted of seditious conspiracy in connection with the 1993 World Trade Center bombing.
Dennis Hastert	47991-424		Served 13 months of a 15-month sentence; released from custody on August 16, 2017.	Former Republican Speaker of the House; convicted of bank fraud in paying hush money to a victim to cover up his serial molestation of teenage boys.
Leo Earl Sharp Sr.	46394-039		Served 13 months of a 3-year sentence; granted compassionate release on June 25, 2015.	Drug courier for Sinaloa Cartel and inspiration for Clint Eastwood movie The Mule.
Gregory Scarpa	30880-053		Died in custody on June 8, 1994.	Colombo crime family hitman and FBI informant; convicted in 1993 of racketeering and three murders.
Keith E. Anderson	63025-004		Served 20 years; released on July 19, 2019.	Owner of Anderson's Ark & Associates tax preparation company; extradited from Costa Rica in 2002; convicted in 2004 of conspiracy, mail fraud, wire fraud and money laundering for assisting over 2,000 clients in five countries evade taxes on millions of dollars of income.
Melvin Mayes	09891-000		Sentenced to 3 life sentences; granted compassionate release on February 15, 2022.	Lieutenant for El Rukn street gang leader Jeff Fort; convicted in absentia in 1987 of racketeering, drug trafficking and conspiring to commit terrorist attacks in the US on behalf of the Libyan government; captured in 1995 after eight years as a fugitive.
Yonathan Melaku	79418-083		Transferred to Baltimore Residential Reentry Management. Serving a 25-year sentence; set to be released on January 12, 2028.	Perpetrator of the Northern Virginia military shootings.
Brian Kolfage	26978-017		Released from custody on March 6, 2026.	Pleaded guilty to conspiracy to commit wire fraud, conspiracy to commit money laundering, filing false tax returns in connection with the We Build the Wall Scam. Kolfage was sentenced to 51 months in prison in April 2023.

== See also ==
- List of United States federal prisons
- Federal Bureau of Prisons
- Incarceration in the United States
