= Jennifer Zipps =

American judge (born 1964)

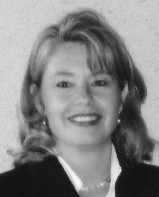

Chief Judge of the United States District Court for the District of Arizona
- Incumbent
- Assumed office October 21, 2024
- Preceded by: G. Murray Snow

Judge of the United States District Court for the District of Arizona
- Incumbent
- Assumed office October 5, 2011
- Appointed by: Barack Obama
- Preceded by: John Roll

Personal details
- Born: Jennifer Christine Pifer; October 20, 1964 (age 61) Ashland, Ohio, U.S.
- Education: University of Arizona (BA); Georgetown University (JD)

Jennifer Guerin Zipps (née Pifer; born October 20, 1964) is an American lawyer who serves as the chief United States district judge of the United States District Court for the District of Arizona. Zipps formerly served as a United States magistrate judge of the same court from 2005 to 2011.

== Early life and education ==
Born in Ashland, Ohio, Zipps earned a Bachelor of Arts degree in 1986 from the University of Arizona and a Juris Doctor in 1990 from Georgetown University Law Center. From 1990 until 1991, she served as a law clerk for Judge William Canby of the United States Court of Appeals for the Ninth Circuit.

== Career ==
From 1991 until 1995, Zipps worked as a litigation associate for the firm Molloy, Jones & Donahue in Tucson, Arizona. From 1999 until 2005, she served as a federal prosecutor. She was an Assistant United States Attorney, serving as chief of the Civil Division in 2002 and the Chief Assistant United States Attorney from 2002 until 2005.

=== Federal judicial service ===
In 2005, she became a United States magistrate judge in Arizona.

On June 23, 2011, President Barack Obama nominated Zipps to a seat on the United States District of Arizona, to replace Judge John Roll, who was killed in the 2011 Tucson shooting. On September 8, 2011, the Senate Judiciary Committee reported her nomination to the Senate floor by voice vote. The United States Senate confirmed Zipps by unanimous consent on October 3, 2011. She received her judicial commission on October 5, 2011. She became chief judge on October 21, 2024.

Legal offices
| Preceded by John Roll | Judge of the United States District Court for the District of Arizona; 2011–present | Incumbent |
| Preceded by G. Murray Snow | Chief Judge of the United States District Court for the District of Arizona; 2024–present | Incumbent |
