= Barack Obama Tucson memorial speech =

Commemoration of the 2011 shooting victims

President Obama speaks in honor of the victims of the 2011 Tucson shooting.

Barack Obama, then-president of the United States, delivered a speech at the Together We Thrive: Tucson and America memorial on January 12, 2011, held in the McKale Center on the University of Arizona campus.

It honored the victims of the 2011 Tucson shooting and included themes of healing and national unity. Watched by more than 30 million Americans, it drew widespread praise from politicians and commentators across the political spectrum and from abroad.

== Writing the speech ==
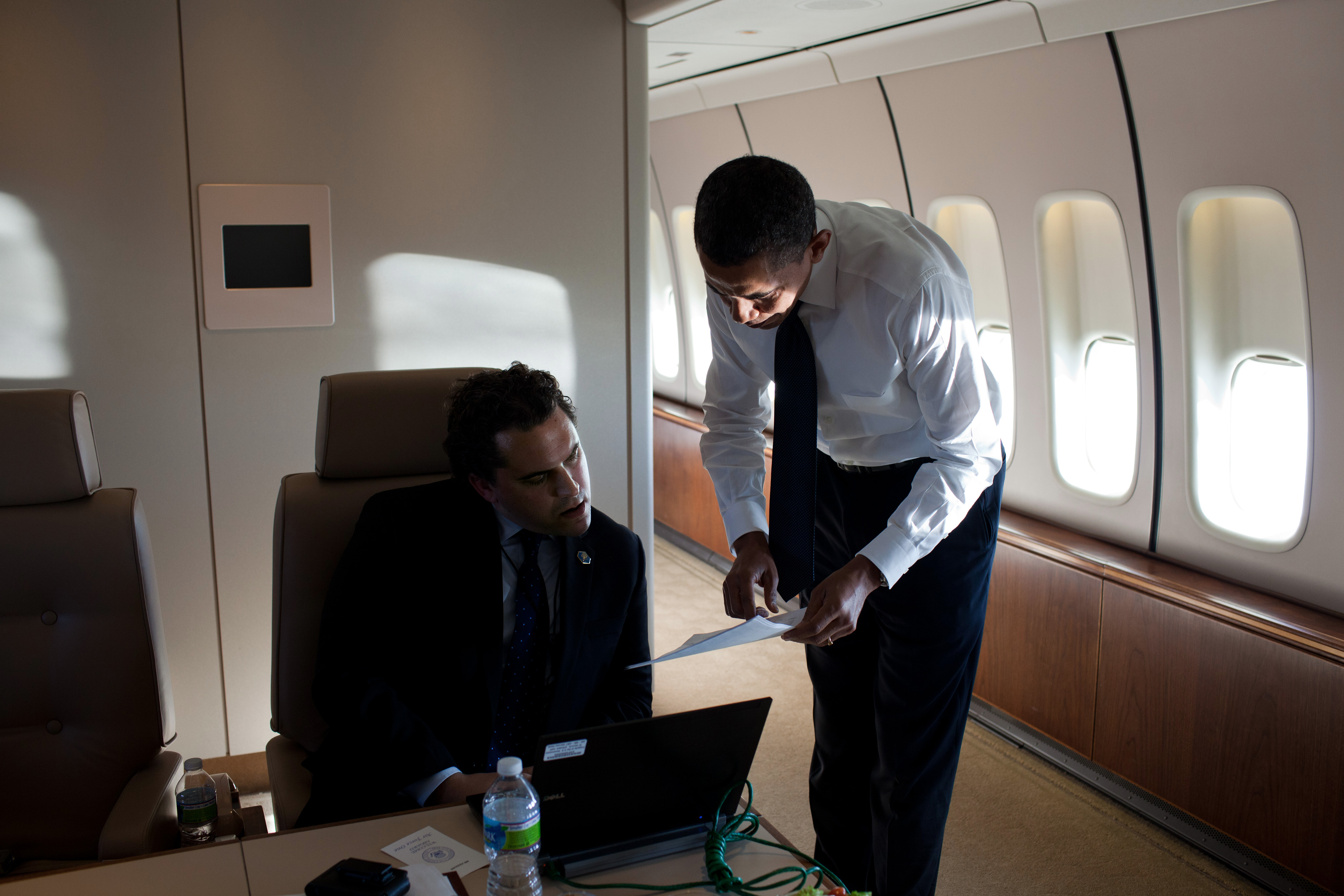
Obama with speechwriter Cody Keenan aboard Air Force One.

Obama began writing his speech the day of the shooting, discussing the matter with young Pentecostal clergyman, Joshua DuBois, head of the White House Office of Faith-Based and Neighborhood Partnerships. That day and the next, he spoke with relatives of the victims of the shooting, including Mark E. Kelly the astronaut who is Gabby Giffords' husband.

The formal speechwriting process began on January 10, with staff speechwriter Cody Keenan. Previously a staffer for Senator Edward Kennedy, Keenan helped write the remarks Obama delivered after Kennedy's death. Keenan is a Chicago native, and was then a recent graduate of Harvard University with a master's degree in public policy.

White House staffers found a copy of Faces of Hope, a book picturing 50 babies born on September 11, 2001. One was Christina-Taylor Green, the girl killed in the shooting. That book contained a quote from the book's author that Obama incorporated into his speech: "I hope you jump in rain puddles."

White House staffers exchanged email with religious advisors about biblical passages, settling on the Book of Job and Psalms 46. Obama decided to quote the lesser-known, middle part of the psalm, feeling it better fit his theme as opposed to more frequently quoted verses.

== Summary of speech ==
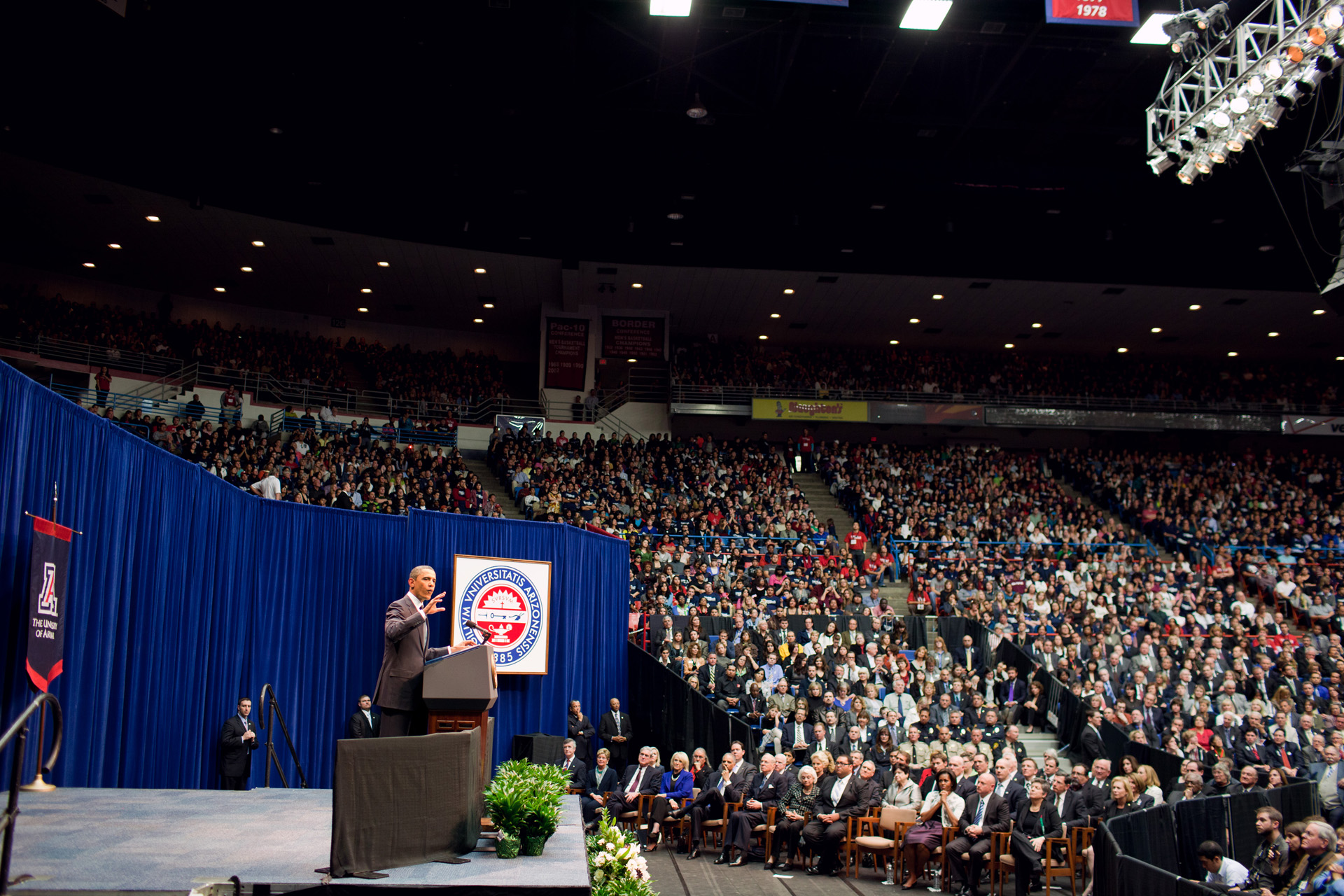
Obama delivers the speech at the McKale Center.

Early in the speech, Obama said, "There is nothing I can say that will fill the sudden hole in your heart," and said that the hopes of the nation were with those in mourning.

He quoted from Psalm 46, verses 4 and 5, and then summarized the events of the previous Saturday morning, when six people were killed and Gabby Giffords was shot through the head, while "gathered outside a supermarket to exercise their right to peaceful assembly and free speech."

Six times over, he devoted four or five sentences each to summarizing the lives of the six who were killed: Judge John Roll, Dorothy Morris, Phyllis Schneck, Dorwan Stoddard, Congressional aide Gabe Zimmerman and Christina-Taylor Green. Summarizing this section of the speech, he said, "Our hearts are broken by their sudden passing. Our hearts are broken—and yet, our hearts also have reason for fullness."

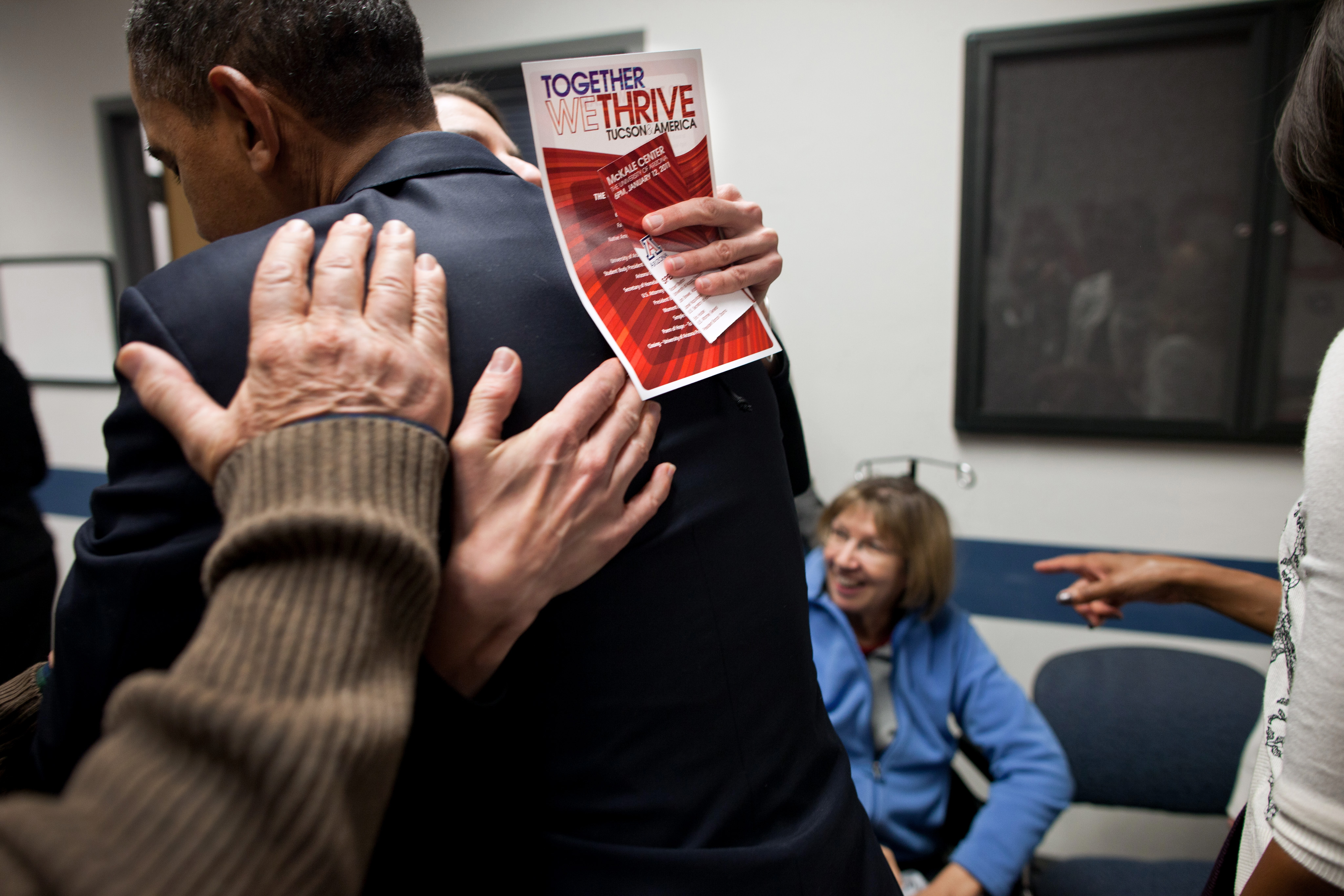
Obama meets with shooting victims and their families at the McKale Center.

He then mentioned the 13 people who had survived being shot, specifically Congresswoman Giffords, who was the most seriously injured. He went on to praise the heroism of those who acted to save people, including those who provided emergency first aid, those who helped disarm and subdue the gunman, and the nurses, physicians and emergency personnel who helped save the lives of the wounded. He mentioned his visit to the hospital and, with permission from her family, said four times that "Gabby had opened her eyes" for the first time since the shooting, to rapturous and the most sustained applause of the many applause breaks during the speech.

Obama discussed how people were seeking to make sense out of something senseless by debating issues such as gun safety laws and the adequacy of the mental health treatment system, observing that such discussions were necessary in exercising self-government. He spoke of a new "National Conversation" already beginning after the tragedy.

He urged that presently polarized national debate be conducted "in a way that heals, not in a way that wounds." Quoting the Book of Job 30:26, he observed that "terrible things happen for reasons that defy human understanding." He then said, "For the truth is that none of us can know exactly what triggered this vicious attack", and that no one can know "what thoughts lurked in the inner recesses of a violent man's mind". Urging his listeners to avoid using the tragedy as "one more occasion to turn on one another", he recommended humility, empathy and especially reflection instead, urging people to consider whether they have "shown enough kindness and generosity and compassion to the people in our lives".

He said "we are reminded that in the fleeting time we have on this Earth, what matters is not wealth, or status, or power, or fame—but rather, how well we have loved, and what small part we have played in making the lives of other people better."

He then returned to a tribute to those who were killed, praising their virtues, and concentrating specifically on the example of Christina-Taylor Green, the nine-year-old girl who had been born on September 11, 2001. He recommended that people should be motivated by their loss to "strive to be better in our private lives", and to "help usher in more civility in our public discourse." At this moment he again addressed the causes of the tragedy, saying " ... let us remember it is not because a simple lack of civility caused this tragedy—it did not...."

Commenting that "those who died here—those who saved lives here—they help me to believe", he observed that, in the end, "people are full of decency and goodness."

Wrapping up his speech with more anecdotes about Christina-Taylor Green, he said, "All of us—we should do everything we can to make sure this country lives up to our children's expectations". After referencing heaven and rain puddles there, and "commitment as Americans to forging a country that is forever worthy of her gentle, happy spirit", he closed the speech with a blessing.

== Responses by American historians ==
Douglas Brinkley called the speech a turning point in the Obama presidency. "It was his most important speech so far, one that history is going to reflect on," said Brinkley. "There was a bit of Dr. King to him. That's simply been missing in his presidency so far. I was sitting there and I realized, 'This guy might be a great man.' I had forgotten about that."

Michael Beschloss said that, "I thought it was one of the best speeches he's ever given. Not only the message, which was to pull the redeeming things out of this horrible episode, but also the way he really sort of came to life while giving it."

History professor Ellen Fitzpatrick of the University of New Hampshire said that, "It was really a sign of what we expect from our president, that is what a leader does in a time of crisis and division and tragedy is to reduce, not heighten tensions. And I thought by his example, the way he described the humanity of all of the people involved in this tragic event, that he showed by the way he spoke and what he asked Americans to do. He led by his own example in a very powerful way."

Garry Wills wrote that "Obama had to rise above the acrimonious debate about what caused the gunman in Tucson to kill and injure so many people. He side-stepped that issue by celebrating the fallen and the wounded and those who rushed to their assistance. He has been criticized by some for holding a "pep rally" rather than a mourning service. But he was speaking to those who knew and loved and had rallied around the people attacked. He was praising them and those who assisted them, and the cheers were deserved." Wills thought very highly of the speech, comparing it to Lincoln's Gettysburg Address and Second inaugural address and to Shakespeare's Henry V's speech at Agincourt.

Doris Kearns Goodwin was struck by the emotion that the usually self-controlled Obama showed during the speech. "He did exactly what the moment called for, in a way that was consistent with him as a cerebral president. It was a completely authentic moment."

== Public opinion regarding the speech ==
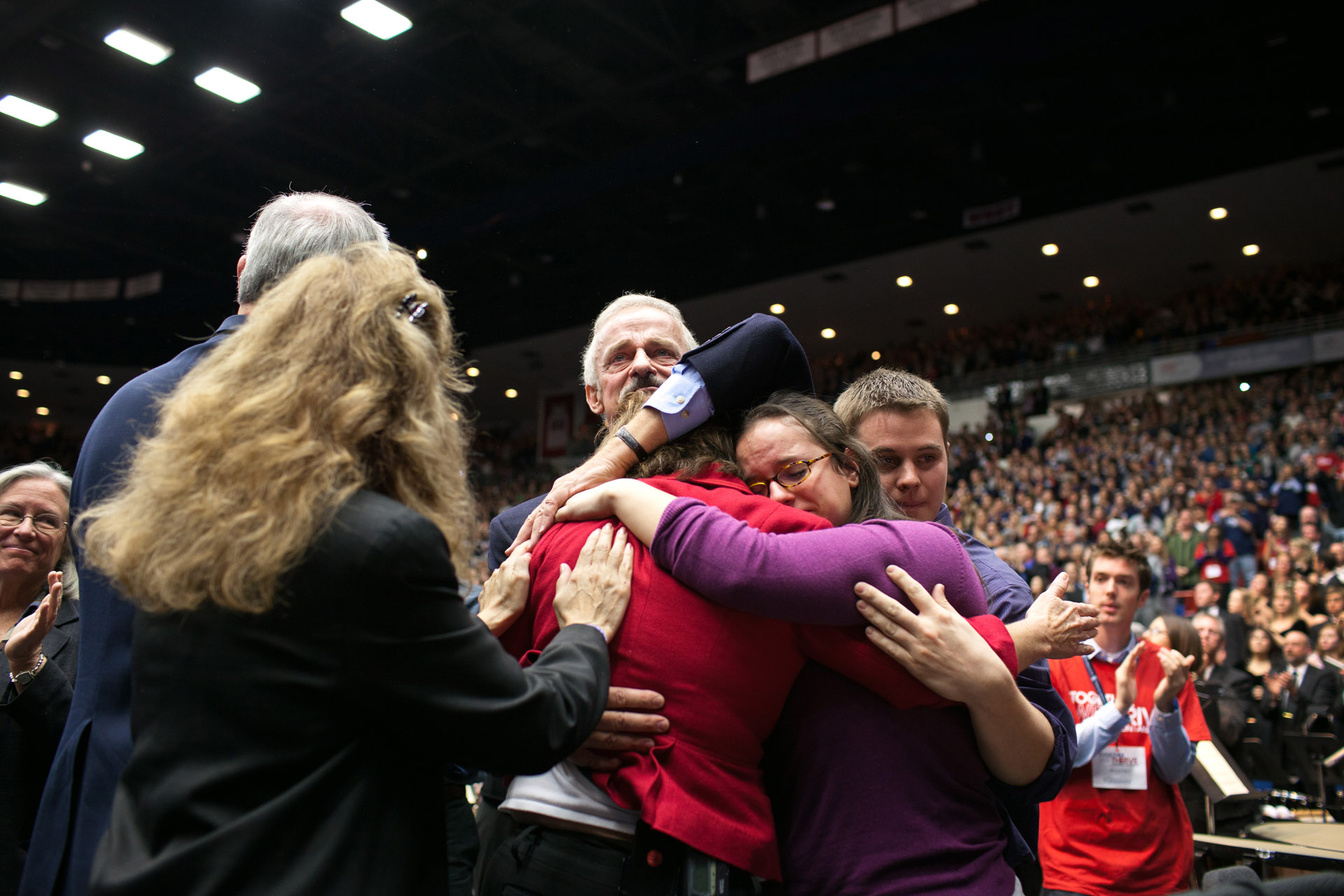
Audience members embrace during the speech.

The Pew Research Center conducted a poll that asked about Americans' response to Obama's speech in Tucson. The report said that "the aftermath of the deadly shooting rampage in Tucson, Ariz., dominated the public's news interest last week as President Obama's speech at a memorial service won praise—across party lines—among those who had read or heard about the event." According to Pew, "Most Americans say they heard at least a little about Obama's speech at the January 12 memorial service at the University of Arizona (75%). Among that group, nearly seven-in-ten (69%) say the address was either excellent (36%) or good (33%), while 21% rate the speech as only fair (15%) or poor (6%)."

ABC News and The Washington Post conducted a poll that gauged public response to Obama's response to the shootings, including his Tucson speech. Pollster Gary Langer reported that "Seventy-eight percent in a new ABC News-Washington Post poll approve of the way Obama has responded to the shootings, which he addressed in a speech in Tucson last week; that includes 71 percent of Republicans and conservatives alike."

One week after the speech, John Harwood of CNBC reported that a poll conducted by NBC News and The Wall Street Journal found that Obama's job approval rating had increased from 45% to 53% in the past month. Harwood said that Obama was "strengthened by his adjustment to Republican gains and his response to the Tucson shootings", and that as a result, he "approaches next week's State of the Union address with renewed political momentum".

While Obama's speech was widely praised, some television viewers felt that excessive applause and cheering from the audience created an inappropriate pep rally-like atmosphere at the service.

== Domestic responses to the speech ==
The speech was notable for receiving acclaim from Republicans and conservatives. Mike Huckabee called it "easily the best speech of his presidency."

Charles Krauthammer praised the speech, especially in regards to Obama's mention of Gifford's opening her eyes for the first time: "the way he seized the moment and he brought the audience to that and became so inspirational" was "quite remarkable and extremely effective."

David Frum added that the "president's challenge, as so often, was to make a human connection. In that, he succeeded tonight. He paid tribute to the individuality of the lost, honored the pain of the bereaved, and was crucial in bringing together the collective community acknowledgment of grief that is the only available comfort to those who mourn."

Senator John McCain praised Obama's call for civility as a "terrific speech". McCain said that Obama had "comforted and inspired the country." McCain also said that Obama had "movingly mourned and honored the victims", and "encouraged every American who participates in our political debates—whether we are on the left or right or in the media—to aspire to a more generous appreciation of one another and a more modest one of ourselves."

The Wall Street Journal reported that praise for the speech came from conservative pundits such as Charles Krauthammer and prominent Republicans including Newt Gingrich, Tim Pawlenty and Ed Rollins. The newspaper reported that Obama was making "an effort to recast himself as a unifying figure, after two years of partisan fights" and that "it was clear he had taken another step in that direction".

Linda Feldmann of The Christian Science Monitor reported that Glenn Beck called the speech "probably the best speech he has ever given." Pat Buchanan called it "splendid." Michael Gerson, speechwriter for George W. Bush, said "it had a good heart." The newspaper reported that Fox News panelists Brit Hume and Chris Wallace had praised the speech.

Fox News commentator Bill O'Reilly wrote an opinion piece in the Boston Herald, saying, "In an excellent speech eulogizing the six dead and paying respect to the critically wounded Rep. Gabrielle Giffords, Obama appealed to the nation to cool down and stop the nonsense." O'Reilly went on to say that Obama should have given the speech sooner.

In addition, various political commentators noted the significance of the speech. David Jackson of USA Today wrote that "A little more than a week after the deadly shooting in Arizona, it seems clear that President Obama's political standing is stronger." Describing the impact of Obama's speech, he said that it had "won near-universal praise, his approval ratings are back at 50% or higher in several polls, and many commentators put him in an improved position for re-election in 2012."

Discussing the speechwriting process, Lynn Sweet of the Chicago Sun-Times wrote that the speech was "memorable" and that it "has gotten good reviews, for content and hitting the right pitch".

"The Plum Line" editorial in The Washington Post commented: "The Tucson speech may go down as one of the most important of Barack Obama's presidency, so it's worth nailing down its most important accomplishment: He finally got conservatives to listen to what he had to say—about them.

In Slate, legal analyst Dahlia Lithwick wrote that "President Obama's speech in Tucson last night should be ranked with his greatest oratorical moments, largely because in the end he was brave enough to sidestep politics and ideology, and speak instead of love, and family, and the need for kindness."

Kent Ward of the Bangor Daily News called it "arguably as fine a speech as he has made in his ceremonial role as head of state."

== International response ==
Political science professor Clifford Orwin of the University of Toronto wrote that "Mr. Obama rose above tacky surroundings to deliver the best speech of his career."

Al Jazeera's Patty Culhane, said Obama's speech set a new marker for how politics is carried out during the rest of his presidency. "From here on out I think everything he does will be measured by the pundits against this incredible speech he gave here tonight," she said. "We've moments in the past where mass tragedies have led to legislation but we haven't seen a change in the tone in Washington.

In the United Kingdom, Ewen MacAskill of The Guardian chose to end a positive article by quoting James Fallows in The Atlantic "A performance to remember. This will be, along with his 2004 convention speech and his March 2008 'meaning of race' speech in Philadelphia, one of the speeches he is lastingly known for—and to add to the list of daunting political/oratorical challenges Obama has not merely met but mastered."

French conservative newspaper Le Figaro considered the discourse "Moving, empathic, and above the raging political conflict." It also noted "a religious approach in phase with a deeply believing America" L'Express claimed that "many people compare his moving appeal to national mourning and solidarity within this ordeal, on January 12, to the decisive Bill Clinton speech after the 1995 Oklahoma City bombing, or the day after 9/11 George W. Bush discourse". It noticed that, while Obama had been criticized for his lack of empathy before, he managed to express his emotions.

The Times of India called the speech "a stirring memorial address by President Obama on Wednesday that abjured politics and called for 'talking with each in a way that heals, not a way that wounds'".

In The Sydney Morning Herald an article by Simon Mann titled "The killer political metaphor under fire" examined the wider political atmosphere surrounding the killings. It referred to The New York Times columnist Paul Krugman's use of the term "eliminationist rhetoric" to describe the atmosphere which preceded them. It also quoted Andrew Sullivan: "To rate this address on any political meter would be to demean it. The President wrested free of politics tonight and spoke of greater things." Mann also mentioned two congressmen who said they intended "packing heat" more often when meeting constituents in future, but that "others seemed resigned to merely a (post speech) truce in the high-octane political sport of baiting and debating" He ended with a quote from Erick Erickson about obstacles to civil politics: "Too many people earn a really good living pushing this tone and this hate."

== See also ==
- 2011 Tucson shooting § Reaction
