= Judge Marquez =

Judge Marquez may refer to:

- Alfredo Chavez Marquez (1922–2014), judge of the United States District Court for the District of Arizona
- Rosemary Márquez (born 1968), judge of the United States District Court for the District of Arizona

== See also ==
- Justice Marquez (disambiguation)
