= Roopali Desai =

Canadian-American judge (born 1978)

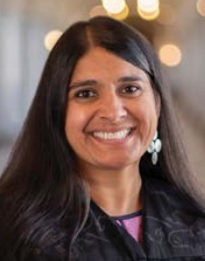
- Desai in 2023

Judge of the United States Court of Appeals for the Ninth Circuit
- Incumbent
- Assumed office October 3, 2022
- Appointed by: Joe Biden
- Preceded by: Andrew D. Hurwitz

Personal details
- Born: Roopali Harshad Desai; 1978 (age 47–48) Toronto, Ontario, Canada
- Relatives: Sharad H. Desai (brother)
- Education: University of Arizona (BA, MPH, JD)

Roopali Hardin Desai (born 1978) is an American lawyer who has served since 2022 as a United States circuit judge of the United States Court of Appeals for the Ninth Circuit.

== Education ==
Desai was born in 1978 in Toronto, Canada. Her Gujarati parents were born in India. She attended the University of Arizona, graduating in 2000 with a Bachelor of Arts. She worked as an outreach coordinator at a children's advocacy center and earned a Master of Public Health from Arizona in 2001. From 2001 to 2002, Desai was director of residential services at a domestic violence shelter. She then attended Arizona's James E. Rogers College of Law, graduating in 2005 with a Juris Doctor. Desai served as the legal counsel and campaign attorney for Senator Kyrsten Sinema.

== Career ==
After graduating from law school, Desai was a law clerk to Chief Judge Mary M. Schroeder of the United States Court of Appeals for the Ninth Circuit from 2005 to 2006. From 2006 to 2007, she was an associate at Lewis & Roca in Phoenix, Arizona. In 2007, Desai joined the Phoenix law firm Coppersmith Brockelman as an associate, becoming a partner in 2013. In naming her one of the publication's 2022 "Women of the Year", USA Today called her "a hero of Democratic legal causes", noting her work to launch a recreational marijuana program in Arizona, her lawsuits fighting false claims about the 2020 United States presidential election, and her work to overturn a ban on mask mandates. Desai is a member of the ACLU.

=== Notable cases ===
In 2020, Desai represented the Arizona Dispensaries Association in advising it on a marijuana legalization campaign.

After the 2020 U.S. presidential election, Desai represented the Arizona Secretary of State's office in several cases involving unsuccessful challenges to the state's results.

=== Federal judicial service ===
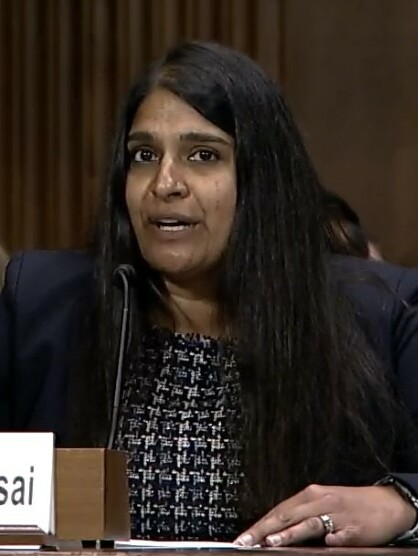
Desai testifying before the Senate Judiciary Committee

On June 15, 2022, President Joe Biden nominated Desai to serve as a United States circuit judge for the United States Court of Appeals for the Ninth Circuit. Biden nominated Desai to the seat vacated by Judge Andrew D. Hurwitz, who announced his intent to assume senior status upon confirmation of a successor. On July 13, 2022, a hearing on her nomination was held before the Senate Judiciary Committee. On July 28, her nomination was favorably reported by the committee by a voice vote, with Senators Mike Lee, Ted Cruz, Josh Hawley, and Marsha Blackburn voting "no". On August 4, the United States Senate confirmed her nomination by a 67–29 vote, just 50 days after her initial nomination and the fastest of any court of appeals nomination since the Clinton administration. She received her judicial commission on October 3, 2022. Desai became the first South Asian person to serve on the Ninth Circuit.

== Personal life ==
Desai is married to artist and Phoenix College professor Jay Hardin. The couple have three daughters. Her brother, Sharad H. Desai, is a United States district judge for the United States District Court for the District of Arizona.

== Publications ==
- State v. Minnitt: Extending Double Jeopardy Protections in the Context of Prosecutorial Misconduct, 46 Ariz. L. Rev. 415 (2004).

== See also ==
- List of Asian American jurists

Legal offices
| Preceded by Andrew D. Hurwitz | Judge of the United States Court of Appeals for the Ninth Circuit; 2022–present | Incumbent |
