= Jared Lee Loughner =

American mass murderer (born 1988)

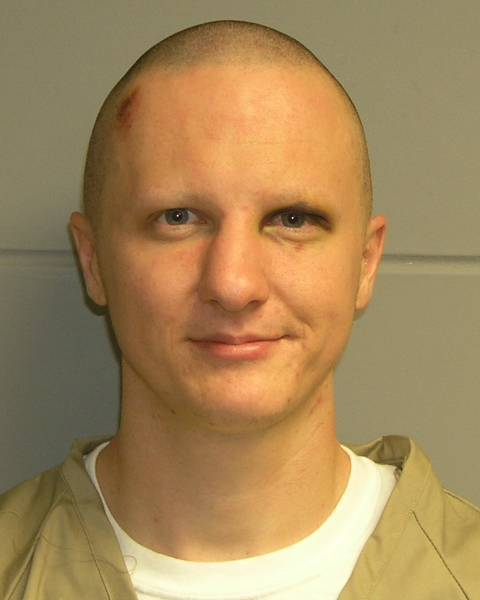
- Mug shot of Loughner taken by U.S. Marshals on January 22, 2011
- Born: Jared Lee Loughner; September 10, 1988 (age 38); Tucson, Arizona, U.S.
- Education: Mountain View High School (dropped out); Pima Community College (withdrew)
- Known for: 2011 Tucson shooting
- Parents: Randy Loughner; Amy Totman
- Status: Incarcerated
- Convictions: First degree murder of a federal employee (2 counts); Attempted assassination of a member of Congress; Attempted murder of a federal employee (2 counts); Interference with a federally protected activity resulting in death (4 counts); Interference with a federally protected activity resulting in bodily injury (10 counts)
- Penalty: 7 consecutive life sentences plus 140 years without parole

Details
- Target: U.S. representative Gabby Giffords
- Killed: 6 (including federal judge John Roll)
- Injured: 13 (including Giffords)
- Weapon: Glock 19 9mm
- Date apprehended: January 8, 2011
- Imprisoned at: Federal Medical Center, Rochester

Jared Lee Loughner (/ˈlɒfnər/; born September 10, 1988) is an American mass murderer who perpetrated the January 8, 2011, Tucson shooting, during which he shot and severely injured U.S. representative Gabby Giffords and killed six people including Chief U.S. District Court Judge John Roll. Loughner shot and injured a total of 13 people, including one man who was injured while subduing him.

Born in 1988, acquaintances say that Loughner's personality had changed markedly in the years prior to the shooting, a period during which he was also abusing alcohol and drugs. He had been suspended from Pima Community College in September 2010 because of his bizarre behavior and disruptions in classes and the library. After his arrest, two medical evaluations diagnosed Loughner with paranoid schizophrenia and ruled him incompetent to stand trial. He was placed on medication while in jail, as part of his treatment. He was again judged incompetent in May 2012.

In August 2012, Loughner was judged competent to stand trial, and at the hearing, he pleaded guilty to 19 counts. In November 2012, he was sentenced to life plus 140 years in federal prison.

== Background ==
Jared Lee Loughner was born on September 10, 1988, and is the only child of Randy and Amy (née Totman) Loughner. They were described by a neighbor as a very private family. Amy Loughner worked for the Pima County Parks Department as a horticulturalist. Randy Loughner was a retired truck driver, but journalists did not determine if he worked outside the house at the time of the shooting. While Loughner had friends in high school, neighbors noted that in the following years, he kept more to himself and rarely spoke to others.

=== Behavior change ===
Loughner attended Mountain View High School in Tucson, Arizona, and dropped out in 2006. Around this time, when he was about eighteen years old, those who knew him noted a change in his personality. Kelsey Hawkes, who dated Loughner for several months in high school, later said she was shocked after hearing of his arrest. "I've always known him as the sweet, caring Jared," said Hawkes, 21 at the time and then a student at the University of Arizona.

Loughner's former classmate and friend Tong Shan stated that her last encounter with Loughner was in October 2010, after he was suspended and dropped out of college and just before he purchased the semi-automatic handgun used in the shooting. She said that while Loughner was "anti-government", he never appeared violent, nor did he mention his plans to buy a gun.

At some point, Loughner was fired from his job at a Quiznos restaurant, with his manager saying he had undergone a personality transformation. After this, Loughner briefly volunteered at a local animal shelter, walking dogs, but he was eventually asked not to return. The shelter manager later said, "He was walking dogs in an area we didn't want dogs walked...he didn't understand or comprehend what the supervisor was trying to tell him. He was just resistant to that information."

According to court records, Loughner had two previous offenses: in October 2007, he was cited in Pima County for possession of drug paraphernalia and on October 13, 2008, he was charged after defacing a street sign in Marana, near Tucson (a charge that was dismissed following the completion of a diversion program in March 2009). The police report noted that he drew a stylized CX, which Loughner said were Christian symbols.

==== Substance use ====
Zach Osler, a high-school classmate of Loughner's and his closest friend, indicated that Loughner's life began to unravel after his high-school girlfriend broke up with him. He began to abuse alcohol and other drugs, including cannabis (marijuana), cocaine, psychedelic mushrooms, LSD, and Salvia divinorum (a hallucinogen legal in Arizona).

Former classmate Caitie Parker remembers Loughner as a "pot head". Loughner had a history of drug use, having been arrested in September 2007 for possession of marijuana and drug paraphernalia. "I haven't seen him in person since '07," Parker recalled in early 2011. "I'm looking back at this [as] a 14–19-year-old...who knows if any of us knew what for sure we were yet?"

After struggling with drugs for more than two years, Loughner gave up alcohol, tobacco, and recreational drugs in late 2008 and has not used since, according to one of his longtime friends. The U.S. Army confirmed that Loughner had been rejected as "unqualified" for service in 2008. According to military sources, Loughner admitted to marijuana use on numerous occasions during the application process.

In the months leading up to the shooting, Loughner's parents became increasingly alarmed at their son's behavior; at one point, they resorted to disabling his car every night in order to keep him at home. On one occasion, his father confiscated his 12-gauge Harrington & Richardson single-shot shotgun and both parents urged him to get psychiatric help. Loughner also became obsessed with controlling what he perceived to be lucid dreams.

==== Suspension from college ====
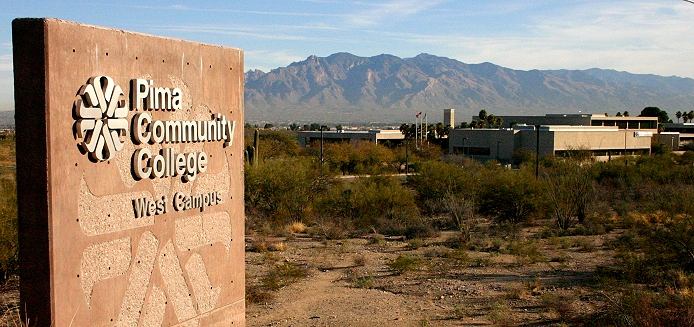
Loughner withdrew from Pima Community College after he was asked to obtain a mental health clearance.

From February to September 2010, while a student at Pima Community College, Loughner had five contacts with campus police for classroom and library disruptions. Some of his teachers complained to the administration about his disruptions and bizarre behavior, as they thought it a sign of mental illness and feared what he might do. On September 29, 2010, college police also discovered a YouTube video shot by Loughner, in which his spoken commentary stated that the college was illegal according to the United States Constitution. He described his school as "one of the biggest scams in America".

The college decided to suspend Loughner and sent a letter to his parents, to consult with them and him together. The college told Loughner that if he wanted to return, he needed to resolve his code of conduct violations and obtain a mental health clearance (indicating, in the opinion of a mental health professional, that his presence did not constitute a danger to himself or others). On October 4, Loughner and his parents met with campus administrators and Loughner indicated he would withdraw from the college. During Loughner's time at Pima, a classmate said she worried that he might commit a school shooting. One of his teachers has claimed a similar suspicion after the Tucson shooting. He never submitted to a mental health evaluation and did not return to the college.

Several college classmates recalled an incident in which Loughner, during a class discussion, had mocked and laughed at a young woman who was describing her abortion. One classmate described Loughner's reaction as "wildly inappropriate". "(Loughner) started making comments about terrorism and laughing about killing the baby," former classmate Don Coorough recalled to ABC News. Yet another classmate, Lydian Ali, recalled that "a girl had written a poem about an abortion. It was very emotional and she was teary eyed and he said something about strapping a bomb to the fetus and making a baby bomb out of it."

== Expressed views ==
=== Views on politics ===
Records show that Loughner was registered as an independent and voted in 2006 and 2008, but not in 2010.

Loughner's high-school friend Zach Osler said, "He did not watch TV; he disliked the news; he didn't listen to political radio; he didn't take sides; he wasn't on the Left; he wasn't on the Right." Zane Gutierrez, a friend, later told The New York Times that Loughner's anger would also "well up at the sight of President George W. Bush, or in discussing what he considered to be the nefarious designs of government."

=== Misogyny and sexism ===
According to a former friend, Bryce Tierney, Loughner had expressed a longstanding dislike for Gabby Giffords. Tierney recalled that Loughner had often said that women should not hold positions of power. He repeatedly derided Giffords as a "fake". This belief intensified after he attended her August 25, 2007 event when she did not, in his view, sufficiently answer his question: "What is government if words have no meaning?" Loughner kept Giffords's form letter, which thanked him for attending the 2007 event, in the same box as an envelope which was scrawled with phrases like "die bitch" and "assassination plans have been made".

=== Conspiracy theories ===
His friend Zach Osler noted that conspiracy theories had a profound effect on Loughner. He was a member of the message board Above Top Secret, which discusses conspiracy theories; members of the site did not respond warmly to posts believed to be from his account. Loughner espoused conspiracy theories about the 9/11 attacks, the New World Order, and believed in a 2012 apocalypse, among other controversial viewpoints.

In the aftermath of the shooting, the Anti-Defamation League reviewed messages by Loughner, and concluded that there was a "disjointed theme that runs through Loughner's writings", which was a "distrust for and dislike of the government." It "manifested itself in various ways" – for instance, in the belief that the government used the control of language and grammar to brainwash people, the notion that the government was creating "infinite currency" without the backing of gold and silver, or the assertion that NASA was faking spaceflights. Reporters who study right-wing militia groups and the so-called "Patriot Movement" found Loughner's comments on subjects like the American currency and the Constitution, which he posted online in various video clips, strikingly similar in language and the Internet's more paranoid, extremist, corners.

=== Views on religion ===
Journalists had speculated that Loughner was antisemitic due to his attack on Giffords, who is Jewish, but the Anti-Defamation League's analysis of the messages by Loughner found that he had a more generalized dislike of religion, and of government, along with women in power. A police report noted that he had previously been caught making graffiti associated with anti-abortion groups.

Contrary to rumors spread at the time, Loughner was not born Jewish. Loughner has been described as an anti-theist by those who knew him. Loughner declined to state his religion in his Army application. In his "Final Thoughts" video, Loughner stated, "No, I don't trust in God!", in reference to the United States national motto printed on coins and paper currency, "In God We Trust". He expressed a dislike for all religions, and was particularly critical of Christians.

== Tucson shooting ==
=== Preparation ===
Loughner allegedly purchased the 9mm Glock pistol used in the shooting from a Sportsman's Warehouse in Tucson on November 30, 2010. The night before the shooting, at 2:05 a.m. he left a message on a friend's voicemail saying, "Hey man, it's Jared. Me and you had good times. Peace out. Later." In a MySpace post the morning of the shooting at 4:12 a.m. he wrote, "Goodbye friends. Please don't be mad at me. The literacy rate is below 5%. I haven't talked to one person who is literate. I want to make it out alive. The longest war in the history of the United States. Goodbye. I'm saddened with the current currency and job employment. I had a bully at school. Thank you. P.S. – plead the fifth!"

The MySpace page showed a close-up photo of a handgun sitting atop a document titled "United States History."

=== Attack ===
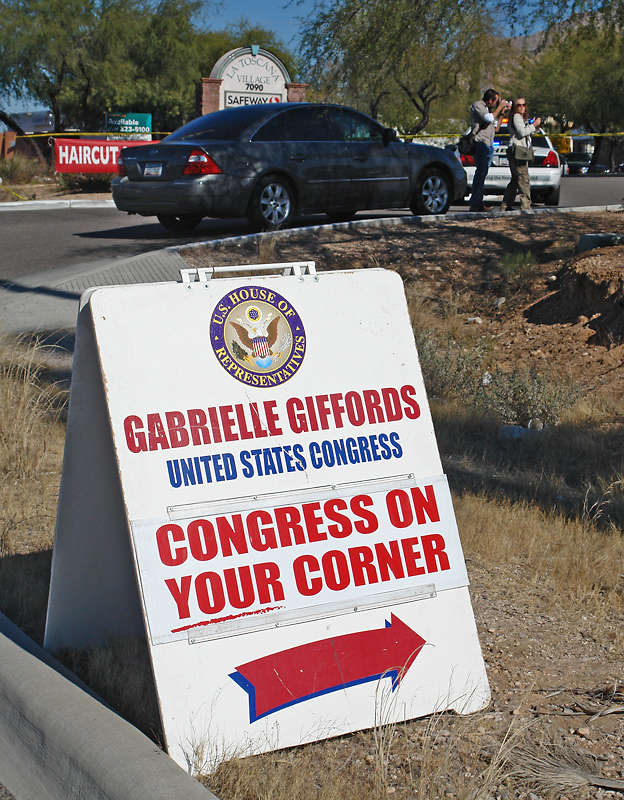
Roadside sign at the scene the day of the shooting

On January 8, 2011, at 7:04 a.m. MST, Loughner went to a Walmart store near the Foothills Mall to purchase ammunition, but left that store and completed his purchase at Walmart on North Cortaro Road at 7:28 a.m. He was stopped by Arizona Game and Fish Department officer Alen Edward Forney at 7:34 a.m. for running a red light, but once the officer determined there were no outstanding warrants for Loughner, he was allowed to proceed to his destination with a warning to drive carefully. Loughner took a taxi to a Safeway supermarket location in Casas Adobes, where Rep. Giffords was holding a constituents meeting. The shooting occurred at 10:10 a.m. MST.

Loughner opened fire on Giffords from close range, hitting her as well as numerous bystanders, and killing six people. Thirteen other people were injured by gunfire, and one person was injured while fleeing the scene of the shooting. Giffords, the target of the attack, was shot in the head and critically injured.

== Arrest and legal proceedings ==
=== Arrest ===
Loughner was stopped by bystanders and was arrested by police, saying, "I plead the Fifth," as he was taken into custody. A photograph taken by the Pima County Sheriff's Office's forensic unit was released to the media on January 10, 2011 and published on front pages nationwide. The Washington Post described Loughner's expression in the photo as "smirking and creepy, with hollow eyes ablaze," while the art director for The New York Times said the photo was featured on the front page because it "was the picture of the day [...] it was intense and arresting. It invited you to look and study, and wonder."

=== Charges ===
Loughner was charged in federal court with one count of attempted assassination of a member of Congress, two counts of murder of a federal employee (Giffords's aide and Judge Roll), and two counts of attempting to murder a federal employee, based on his injury of two of Giffords's aides. He was indicted on three of the charges on January 19, 2011. Loughner was held without bail in the Federal Correctional Institution at Phoenix, kept isolated from other inmates 23 hours a day and allowed out of his cell for one hour a day to shower and exercise. On February 24, 2011, he was transferred to the United States Penitentiary in Tucson.

Attorney Judy Clarke, a former federal public defender who in the past had represented suspects in several high-profile murder and terrorism cases, was appointed to represent Loughner in federal court. The entire federal judiciary of Arizona recused themselves from hearing the case because of their ties to fellow judge John Roll, who was killed. Federal prosecutors opposed motions to move the case outside of Arizona because of pre-trial publicity. At the direction of Ninth Circuit Appeals court Chief Judge Kozinski, the federal case was assigned to Larry Alan Burns, a San Diego-based judge from the Southern District of California.

Prosecutors representing the State of Arizona, which has concurrent jurisdiction in the matter, announced they intended to file murder and attempted murder charges on behalf of the victims who were neither members of Congress nor federal employees (although they could legally file charges on behalf of all victims, at their discretion). Arizona state prosecutors normally have ten days from the time a suspect is brought into custody to file charges, but time spent in federal custody does not count towards this limitation. Arizona law does not permit a verdict of "not guilty by reason of insanity", but does allow for a verdict of "guilty but insane."

=== Initial pleading and additional charges ===
On January 24, 2011, Loughner appeared at the Sandra Day O'Connor U.S. Courthouse in Phoenix, before Judge Larry Alan Burns from San Diego. Loughner, whose hair had partially regrown since his arrest, smiled while presented with the charges related to the shooting, including the attempted killing of Giffords and two of her aides. Loughner's attorney, Judy Clarke, requested that Judge Burns enter a plea on her client's behalf, to which a plea of not guilty was recorded. When Burns asked Clarke if Loughner understood the charges against him, she replied that they were "not raising that issue" at the time. She did not object to a request by prosecutors to have future hearings moved back to Tucson. On March 3, 2011, a federal grand jury indicted Loughner on additional charges of murder and attempted murder for a total of 49 counts. On March 9, 2011, Loughner pleaded not guilty to all 49 charges.

=== Relationship with lawyers ===
On May 25, 2011, Judge Burns stated, "I got some letters declaring some conflict with his counsel ... I intend to table them at this time. At such a point that his competency is restored, if he wants to bring up the matter of counsel, he can renew it then." The judge suppressed the letters from the court record.

=== Medico-legal proceedings ===
On May 25, 2011, Burns ruled Loughner was then incompetent to stand trial, based on two medical evaluations. Court proceedings were suspended while Loughner, who had been diagnosed with paranoid schizophrenia, received psychiatric treatment at the psychiatric wing of the U.S. Medical Center for Federal Prisoners in Springfield, Missouri. He was scheduled to appear in court on September 21, 2011, but that hearing was delayed until September 28, 2011, when the judge reviewed whether he could understand the charges against him and could assist in his own defense. (Loughner's lawyers unsuccessfully objected to him appearing at the hearing.)

Loughner disrupted the court hearing with an outburst, and was carried from the courtroom. According to The New York Times, Loughner believed he succeeded in killing Giffords, and clashed with his lawyer when she informed him that the congresswoman had survived. He was judged still incompetent to stand trial following medical evaluations and a hearing in May 2011.

==== Forced medication rulings ====
On June 26, 2011, Burns ruled that prison doctors could forcibly medicate Loughner with antipsychotic drugs in order to treat him to restore him to competency for trial, but on July 12, 2011, a three-judge federal appeals panel from the Ninth Circuit ruled that Loughner could refuse anti-psychotic medication, since he "has not been convicted of a crime, is presumptively innocent and is therefore entitled to greater constitutional protections than a convicted inmate." However, the ruling stated that it "does not preclude prison authorities from taking other measures to maintain the safety of prison personnel, other inmates and Loughner himself, including forced administration of tranquilizers".

A week after the ruling, prison medical authorities resumed forcible treatment of Loughner with the antipsychotic risperidone, this time citing Washington v. Harper and stating the purpose of treatment was the need to control the danger he posed to himself and others in prison, rather than rendering him fit for trial. Loughner's defense team submitted an emergency motion to the US Court of Appeals for the Ninth Circuit, claiming that this treatment was in violation of their ruling and seeking an immediate injunction to halt treatment. The request for an injunction was denied by the court, allowing treatment to continue pending a full hearing into the matter. Arguments began on August 30 as to the lawfulness of this treatment. In March 2012, a federal appeals court denied a request by Loughner's lawyers to halt his forced medication.

On May 24, 2012, a federal judge ordered a competency hearing for June 27 (later postponed until August 7) to determine Loughner's mental fitness to stand trial. He remained at a federal prison hospital in Missouri pending the entry of his plea. A request by Loughner's lawyers to rehear arguments on forced medication was denied on June 5, 2012.

=== Guilty plea and sentencing ===
On August 7, 2012, Judge Burns found Loughner competent to stand trial based on medical evaluations. Loughner pleaded guilty to 19 counts at the hearing, which spared him the death penalty. The hearing began with Loughner listening to testimony from Christina Pietz, Loughner's forensic psychologist, who testified that he had displayed depressive symptoms in 2006 and was formally diagnosed with schizophrenia in 2011. Pietz said that she believed that, after having been forcibly medicated for more than a year, Loughner had expressed remorse and was a changed individual. She said that he was competent to stand trial and agree to a plea. Sentencing was set for November 15, 2012, at 10 a.m. local time. The sentence could not include the death penalty, because the guilty plea bargain was made with an assurance that it would not be sought; Loughner under the law faced a mandatory sentence of life imprisonment without the possibility of parole. Gabrielle Giffords and her husband, retired NASA astronaut Mark Kelly, U.S. Representative Ron Barber, a former aide to Mrs. Giffords who was shot in the attack, U.S. Attorney General Eric Holder, and the U.S. Attorney for Arizona, John S. Leonardo, had all approved the plea. It was offered and accepted after consultation with them and with the families of the other victims.

By pleading guilty in the deal, Loughner automatically waived his right to any further appeals and could not later alter his plea to an insanity plea. Loughner must pay restitution of $19 million, $1 million for each of the victims. He forfeited the weapons he used in the incident, and any money earned from efforts to sell his story. Loughner answered that he understood each charge, and signed his initials after each page of the agreement and signed his name to it, dated August 6.

On November 8, 2012, Loughner appeared in front of U.S. District Court Judge Larry Alan Burns in a court in Tucson. He was sentenced to serve seven consecutive life terms plus 140 years in prison without parole. Even though he was convicted and sentenced in federal court, there was still a possibility that Loughner could be tried for murder and other crimes in Arizona court. Pima County Attorney Barbara LaWall declared later that afternoon that she would not prosecute Jared Loughner on behalf of the State of Arizona. LaWall explained that her decision would afford the victims and their families, as well as the community in Tucson and Pima County, an opportunity to move forward with their lives. She said that, after speaking and consulting personally with each of the surviving victims and with the family members of those killed, it was clear that they would not be benefitted by a State prosecution. Surviving victims and family members told LaWall that they are "completely satisfied with the federal prosecution", that "justice has been served", and that the federal sentence is "suitably severe".

As of 2015, Loughner is serving his life sentence at the Federal Medical Center, Rochester, Minnesota, a prison for inmates with specialized health issues.
