= Judy Clarke =

American criminal defense attorney

Judy Clare Clarke
- Born: 1952 (age 73–74); Asheville, North Carolina
- Education: Furman University (B.A.); University of South Carolina School of Law (J.D.)
- Occupation: Criminal Defense Attorney
- Spouse: Thomas H. Speedy Rice
- Parent(s): Harry Wilson Clarke & Patsy Clarke
- Website: www.cjtrlaw.com/judy-clarke/

Judy Clare Clarke (born 1952) is an American criminal defense attorney who has represented several high-profile defendants such as Ted Kaczynski, Eric Rudolph, Dzhokhar Tsarnaev, Joseph Edward Duncan, Zacarias Moussaoui, Jared Lee Loughner, Robert Gregory Bowers, Burford Furrow, Lisa Montgomery and Susan Smith.

She has negotiated plea agreements that spared her clients the death penalty, as was the case for Eric Rudolph, Ted Kaczynski, and Jared Lee Loughner. In the case of Susan Smith, Clarke argued to the jury that ultimately voted against imposing the death penalty. In the case of Dzhokhar Tsarnaev the jury voted for the death penalty.

From 1996 to 1997, she served as president of the National Association of Criminal Defense Lawyers. Clarke received the John Frank Award from the 9th Circuit Court of Appeals.

Raised in Asheville, North Carolina, Clarke is a graduate of T.C. Roberson High School, Furman University and University of South Carolina School of Law. Clarke served as executive director of the Federal Defenders of San Diego, Inc. (FDSDI) and the Federal Defenders of the Eastern District of Washington and Idaho.

== Family and education ==
Judy Clare Clarke is the daughter of Harry Wilson Clarke and Patsy Clarke. Patsy Clarke was the daughter of a Massachusetts movie theater manager who moved the family to Asheville when Patsy was a teen. Her parents met while in college together. Clarke grew up in Asheville, North Carolina. Growing up, she had three other siblings: Candy, Mark, and one other. Her father was a civic leader in Asheville and president of Western Carolina Industries employer association. Her mother spent much of her time raising her four children and occasionally acted in regional theater productions. Clarke's parents were conservative Republicans. Her father campaigned for Senator Jesse Helms. In 1987, her father, Harry, was killed in the crash of a private plane near Asheville. Helms called Patsy Clarke to offer his condolences and sent the family a flag that had been flown in his honor at the U.S. Capitol.

From about the sixth or seventh grade, Clarke wanted to be a lawyer or a judge. As a child, her mother taught her the Constitution and she remained interested in it. Moreover, Clarke regularly argued her opinions on current events at the big table her father installed in the family's kitchen. Her parents encouraged independent thinking. For college, Clarke studied psychology at Furman University in Greenville, South Carolina. She graduated from Furman in 1974. Right after college, Clarke went to the University of South Carolina School of Law and received her J.D. in 1977.

In the early 1990s, her brother Mark was diagnosed HIV-positive and revealed to Judy and his mother that he was gay. At the time, he was studying law at California Western School of Law in San Diego, California. In 1994, he died of AIDS. After seeing Jesse Helms attacking gay people on the floor of the Senate and trying to block funding for further AIDS research, Clarke wrote him a letter to ask him to be kind to those who were dying or had died of AIDS. Helms responded in a letter: "I know Mark's death was a devastating blow to you. As far as homosexuality, the Bible judges it, I do not. As for Mark, I wish he had not played Russian roulette with his sexual activity. I have sympathy for him and for you. But there is no escaping the reality of what happened." After this, Judy persuaded her mother to come out against Helms, their longtime family friend. Clarke and Eloise Vaughn—an equally well-connected conservative in North Carolina politics and one who had also lost a son to AIDS—created MAJIC, Mothers Against Jesse in Congress. They opposed him vigorously in the 1996 election, but he ultimately won re-election.

== Legal career ==
Right after law school, she moved to San Diego, California, to work as a trial attorney for the Federal Defenders of San Diego, Inc. (FDSDI). She was quickly promoted to Senior Trial Attorney and Chief Trial Attorney. From 1983 until 1991, Clarke served as the executive director of FDSDI. During her tenure as executive director, federal sentencing guidelines were created, a product of the Sentencing Reform Act of 1984. She argued United States v. Rojas-Contreras (1985) and United States v. Munoz-Flores (1990) before the Supreme Court of the United States. In 1992, Clarke left FDSDI to lead the newly created federal defender office in the Eastern District of Washington and Idaho, which she did until June 2002. From 2002 to 2009, she served as the first full-time Capital Resource Counsel for the Federal Public and Community Defender Program. She is currently in private practice in San Diego, California with her husband, Thomas H. Speedy Rice.

In addition, Clarke previously served as president of the National Association of Criminal Defense Lawyers. She was the first public defender president and the second woman president. Clarke is a member of the Federal Death Penalty Resource Counsel, which helps judges recruit qualified federal public defenders. She has been a fellow of the American College of Trial Lawyers since 1997. Clarke is a Professor of Practice at Washington and Lee University School of Law.

=== Susan Smith ===
In 1995, she took a leave of absence to serve as co-counsel for Susan Smith, the South Carolina woman who faced the death penalty in South Carolina Circuit Court for killing her two sons. Her co-counsel was David Bruck, a friend of hers from law school.

In her opening statement, Clarke argued Smith was deeply troubled and suffering from severe depression. She told the jury: "This is not a case about evil. This is a case about despair and sadness." Clarke, however, conceded that Smith knew what she did was wrong, and it tortured her. Clarke pointed out the tragedies in Smith's life that included being molested by her stepfather, the suicide of her father and her own suicide attempts—twice when Smith was in her teens. The defense's theory of the case was that Smith drove to the edge of the lake to kill herself and her two sons, but her body willed itself out of the car. The prosecution, on the other hand, believed Smith murdered her children in order to start a new life with a former lover. It only took the jury two and a half hours to convict her of murdering her two sons.

Tommy Pope, the lead prosecutor in the Smith case, argued passionately in favor of sentencing Smith to death. But the jury ultimately voted against imposing the death penalty. Pope believes that Clarke was able to humanize Susan Smith and help them see that Smith was herself a victim. Smith was sentenced to life imprisonment with a possibility of parole after 30 years.

After the trial, the judge was impressed by Clarke's work and increased her fee to US$83,000. After paying the taxes, she donated the money to a criminal defense fund.

=== Theodore Kaczynski ===
In 1996, Federal Defender Quin Denvir filed papers asking U.S. District Judge Garland Burrell to appoint Clarke as his co-counsel for Ted Kaczynski who was accused of seven explosions connected to the Unabomber and faced the death penalty. Clarke and the defense made unsuccessful challenges to the search of Kaczynski's cabin and the statements he made after his capture. In addition, the defense began preparation for an insanity defense, which Kaczynski did not support. Kaczynski's brother David Kaczynski said of Clarke: "She had the ability to develop a relationship with Ted, and that was not one of his gifts. He does not connect easily or well with people." Moreover, he said, "I thought [that] she understands my brother as a human being who has significant issues and challenges and mental problems, who's done something terrible but is still on the level of a human being." About the time of jury selection, Kaczynski moved to dismiss his lawyers, but that motion was denied. The day before the trial was to begin, Kaczynski pleaded guilty in order to prevent his counsel from portraying him legally insane. After his guilty plea, the judge sentenced Kaczynski to life in prison without parole, serving his sentence at ADX Florence. Later Kaczynski was quoted describing Judy Clarke as "a bitch on wheels and a sicko."

=== Buford Furrow ===
In 2000, she was appointed to represent Buford O. Furrow, the Aryan Nations member, accused of the Los Angeles Jewish Community Center shooting, and the fatal shooting of a Filipino-American postal worker in 1999. Prosecutors dropped the death penalty when the defense documented and charted Furrow's long history of psychiatric treatment for bipolar disorder. In 2001, Furrow pleaded guilty and was sentenced to five life terms.

=== Zacarias Moussaoui ===
In 2002, she was appointed co-counsel for 9/11 suspect Zacarias Moussaoui in United States District Court for the Eastern District of Virginia. In June 2002, Judge Leonie Brinkema granted Moussaoui's motion to represent himself and allowed the case to move forward. Clarke then served as standby counsel for Moussaoui. Although Judge Brinkema revoked Moussaoui's self-representation, it appears that Clarke acted as a consultant to the defense. Moussaoui ultimately pleaded guilty, but was spared the death penalty by a jury. He is serving a life sentence without parole at the federal ADX Supermax prison in Florence, Colorado, USA.

=== Eric Rudolph ===
In 2004, after Defense Attorney Richard Jaffe withdrew from the case, she was appointed lead counsel for Eric Rudolph who was charged in the Centennial Olympic Park bombing in 1996 and other bombings a year later. Clarke and the defense tried to suppress evidence, but that motion was denied. After the prosecution announced that they would seek the death penalty, a federal judge also rejected a claim by the defense that prosecutors waited too long to announce they would seek the death penalty. In April 2005, Rudolph pleaded guilty avoiding the death penalty. He is currently serving life in prison without the possibility of parole at ADX Florence.

=== Jared Lee Loughner ===
In 2011, the United States district court in Phoenix, Arizona assigned Clarke as defense counsel to Jared Lee Loughner, the perpetrator of the 2011 Tucson shooting. The Phoenix Public Defenders' Office had requested that Clarke be retained in order to allow Loughner to receive competent counsel without the possibility of a community-wide conflict of interest arising from proceedings against him for his alleged role in the shooting. In 2012, Clarke brokered a deal sparing Loughner's life in exchange for a guilty plea to 19 counts, including the wounding of then congresswoman Gabby Giffords. Loughner is serving life in prison without parole.

=== Dzhokhar Tsarnaev ===
In 2013, Clarke was appointed to the defense team representing Boston Marathon bombing suspect Dzhokhar Tsarnaev. Clarke admitted her client's guilt and told the jury that he was responsible for the "senseless, horrific, misguided acts" referring to Tsarnaev's bombing of the Boston marathon. A federal jury convicted Tsarnaev of all 30 charges against him and found him responsible for the deaths of the three people killed in the 2013 attack and the killing of an MIT police officer three days later. A federal jury sentenced Tsarnaev to death in 2015. On July 31, 2020, the First Circuit overturned the death sentence and ordered a retrial for the penalty phase of Tsarnaev's trial, although that decision was reversed by the U.S. Supreme Court in March 2022 which upheld the death sentence for Tsarnaev.

=== Robert Gregory Bowers ===
Clarke served as defense attorney for Robert Gregory Bowers, who murdered 11 worshippers in a shooting at the Tree of Life – Or L'Simcha Congregation synagogue in Pittsburgh, Pennsylvania, in 2018. The federal jury issued a unanimous decision to sentence Bowers to the death penalty on August 2, 2023.

=== Representation style and views ===
Clarke is considered by fellow criminal defense attorneys to be a master strategist, known for her skill in representing the most notorious and reviled defendants. In a speech at Loyola Law School, Clarke in essence said that her clients—no matter how horrible the crimes they are accused of committing—are real people, not monsters, and that she tries to understand what caused them to do it. In many of her cases, Clarke acknowledges her client's guilt in the opening statement. She does not seek publicity and routinely declines interview requests, preferring to let her courtroom statements and filings speak for themselves. She opposes capital punishment.
