= Justice Marquez =

Justice Marquez may refer to:

- Midas Marquez (born 1966), associate justice of the Supreme Court of the Philippines
- Monica Márquez (born 1969), associate justice of the Colorado Supreme Court

== See also ==
- Judge Marquez (disambiguation)
