= G. Murray Snow =

American judge (born 1959)

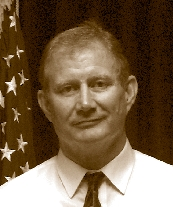

Senior Judge of the United States District Court for the District of Arizona
- Incumbent
- Assumed office October 21, 2024

Chief Judge of the United States District Court for the District of Arizona
- In office September 4, 2018 – October 21, 2024
- Preceded by: Raner Collins
- Succeeded by: Jennifer Zipps

Judge of the United States District Court for the District of Arizona
- In office July 23, 2008 – October 21, 2024
- Appointed by: George W. Bush
- Preceded by: Stephen M. McNamee
- Succeeded by: Sharad H. Desai

Judge of the Arizona Court of Appeals
- In office 2002–2008

Personal details
- Born: Grant Murray Snow; October 20, 1959 (age 66) Boulder City, Nevada, U.S.
- Education: Brigham Young University (BA, JD)

Grant Murray Snow (born October 20, 1959) is an American lawyer and jurist who serves as a senior United States district judge of the United States District Court for the District of Arizona. Snow was previously a state court judge on the Arizona Court of Appeals from 2002 to 2008.

== Early life and education ==
Snow was born in Boulder City, Nevada. He received a Bachelor of Arts degree from Brigham Young University in 1984. He received a Juris Doctor from the J. Reuben Clark Law School at Brigham Young University in 1987.

== Career ==
Snow started his legal career as a law clerk for Judge Stephen H. Anderson of the United States Court of Appeals for the Tenth Circuit from 1987 to 1988. He was in private practice in Phoenix, Arizona, from 1988 to 2002. He was a judge on the Arizona Court of Appeals from 2002 to 2008.

=== Federal judicial service ===
Snow was nominated by President George W. Bush on December 11, 2007, to a seat vacated by Stephen M. McNamee. He was confirmed by the United States Senate on June 26, 2008. He received his commission on July 23, 2008. He served as chief judge from 2018 to 2024. He assumed senior status on October 21, 2024.

=== Notable cases ===
On May 24, 2013, Snow ruled that the Maricopa County Sheriff's Office (MCSO), and Maricopa County Sheriff Joe Arpaio violated the Civil Rights Act of 1964, and committed acts of racial profiling against Hispanics. The judge will also preside over the United States Department of Justice's lawsuit to gain access to MCSO's documents and facilities, as part of the department's investigation of alleged discrimination in MCSO's police practices and jail operations. On January 15, 2015, he announced that he would be bringing civil contempt charges against the MCSO, with a hearing to be held in April, and on August 19, 2016, as one result of those proceedings, he issued an order requesting that the United States Attorney for the Arizona district prosecute Arpaio and three of his MCSO associates for criminal contempt.

== Sources ==
Legal offices
Preceded by Stephen M. McNamee	Judge of the United States District Court for the District of Arizona; 2008–2024	Succeeded by Sharad H. Desai
Preceded by Raner Collins	Chief Judge of the United States District Court for the District of Arizona; 2018–2024	Succeeded by Jennifer Zipps
