= Miles J. Jones =

American forensic pathologist and physician-abuser

Miles James Jones
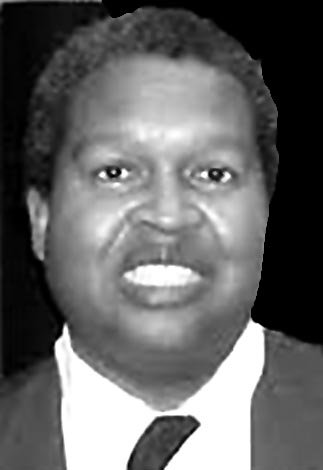
- Born: November 22, 1952; Willow Grove, Pennsylvania, USA
- Died: February 9, 2013 (age 60); Liberty, MO, USA
- Citizenship: US

Miles James Alfred Jones, Jr., M.D. (22 November 1952 – 9 February 2013) was a forensic pathologist who became one of the most notorious physician-abusers of internet-mediated services. He was also cited for contempt of the U.S. Congress for failure to appear before it concerning his activities in the sale of fetal body parts. He was eventually imprisoned in the Federal Corrections System for failure to pay U.S. income taxes for two years.

== Early life and education ==
Miles Jones was raised in Willow Grove, Pennsylvania, and he attended public schools there. Jones matriculated to Princeton University (Princeton, NJ) and graduated from that institution with a B.S. degree in Biology in 1973. He then attended Howard University College of Medicine in Washington, D.C., and was granted the M.D. degree in 1977.

== Postgraduate training ==
Jones completed a one-year clinical internship in general surgery at the Cleveland Clinic (Cleveland, OH), and then entered the residency program in anatomic and clinical pathology at the Mayo Clinic in Rochester, Minnesota. He completed his 4-year course of training in 1982 and was certified by the American Board of Pathology. Even during his residency, Miles demonstrated a thirst for public attention, exemplified by his notification of the national media that he was going to present a "landmark" study on toxic-shock syndrome at a semiannual meeting of the American Society for Clinical Pathology in 1982.

== Employment ==
Jones secured a position in the section of Gynecological & Breast Pathology at the U.S. Armed Forces Institute of Pathology, where he worked as a junior staff pathologist for two years. He left to accept one in a series of hospital-practice positions in general pathology, which included jobs in Washington, D.C.; Herrin, Illinois; Atlanta, Georgia; Nashville, Tennessee; and Lee's Summit, Missouri. During this time, Jones also obtained training and certification in forensic pathology.

== Medical abuses ==
Sometime in the late 1990s, Jones conceived a plan to procure fetal body parts from human abortions, and sell them for commercial use using the internet as a conduit. His intended customers were indiscriminately chosen, and were defined as "anyone who has the money." Jones further considered opening his own abortion facility in Mexico to amplify the supply of fetal parts, likening the concept to "invention of the assembly line". These activities came to the attention of the U.S. media, and ABC television did a clandestine investigation of Jones' activities which culminated in filmed interviews with him that appeared on the show 20/20 in 1999.

His next and final enterprise was the mass-prescription of various medications—but principally of sildenafil (Viagra)—on the internet, on a site called NetDr.com. The medical boards of several states analyzed the propriety and legality of that operation, and concluded that Jones was engaging in unprofessional practices. The Washington Post ran a front-page article on his internet-prescribing operation; he subsequently lost his license to practice medicine in over 20 states, and was eventually struck from the register of the U.S. Drug Enforcement Administration.

Next, Jones was investigated by the U.S. Treasury for failure to file income tax returns. He was found guilty of that charge in 2009 and was sentenced to 18 months incarceration at the Federal Medical Center, Rochester, Minnesota.

== Release from prison and death ==
After Jones was released from prison, he could no longer practice medicine in any form. He died in Liberty, Missouri, on February 9, 2013, four years to the day from his initial date of incarceration.
