= Sharad H. Desai =

American judge (born 1981)

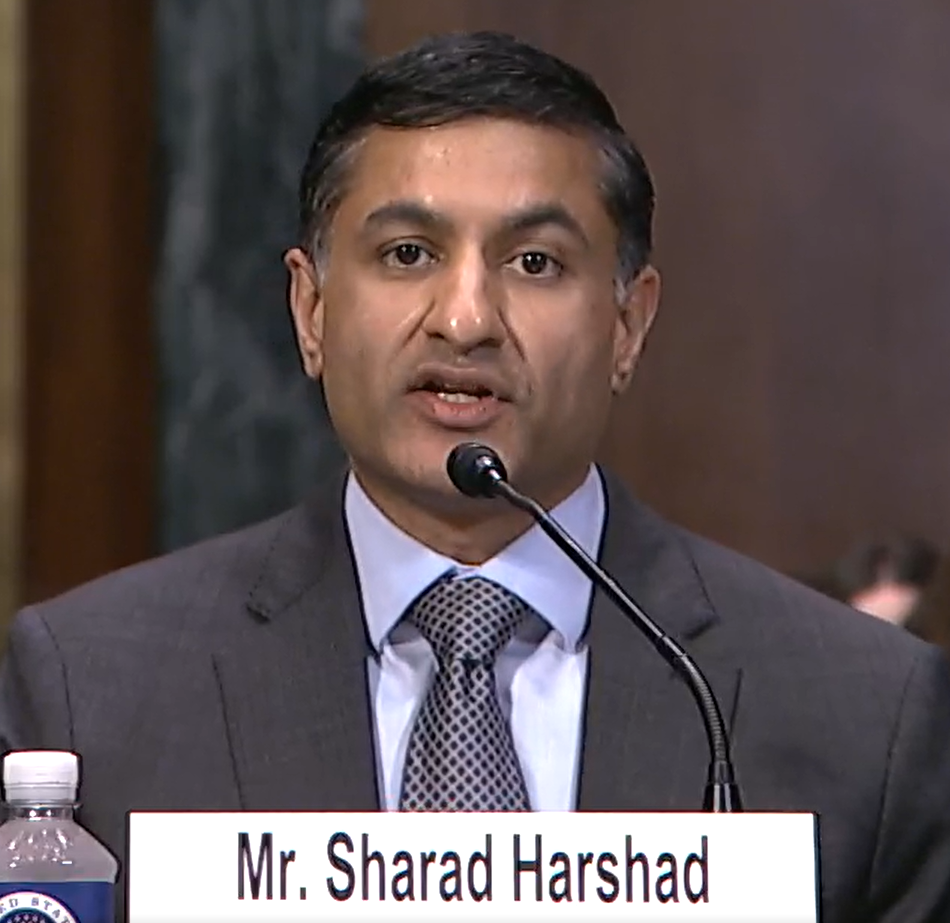

Judge of the United States District Court for the District of Arizona
- Incumbent
- Assumed office January 7, 2025
- Appointed by: Joe Biden
- Preceded by: G. Murray Snow

Personal details
- Born: Sharad Harshad Desai; 1981 (age 44–45) Phoenix, Arizona, U.S.
- Relatives: Roopali Desai (sister)
- Education: University of Arizona (BS, BA); New York University (JD)

Sharad Harshad Desai (born 1981) is an American lawyer who serves as a United States district judge of the United States District Court for the District of Arizona.

== Education ==
Desai earned a Bachelor of Arts and Bachelor of Science from the University of Arizona in 2003 and a Juris Doctor from New York University School of Law in 2006.

== Career ==
Desai began his legal career serving as a law clerk for Justice Rebecca White Berch of the Arizona Supreme Court from 2006 to 2007. From 2007 to 2015, he worked as an attorney with the Phoenix law firm Osborn Maledon, P.A., first as an associate and later as partner. He is a member of the South Asian Bar Association of Arizona and has worked in senior legal counsel roles at Honeywell since 2015. From 2023 to 2025, Desai was the vice president and general counsel for Honeywell International's Integrated Supply Chain and Information Technology divisions in Phoenix, Arizona.

=== Federal judicial service ===
On August 28, 2024, President Joe Biden announced his intent to nominate Desai to serve as a United States district judge of the United States District Court for the District of Arizona. Desai's nomination was endorsed by Senators Kyrsten Sinema and Mark Kelly. On September 9, 2024, his nomination was sent to the Senate. President Biden nominated Desai to the seat vacated by Judge G. Murray Snow, who subsequently assumed senior status on October 21, 2024. On September 25, 2024, a hearing on his nomination was held before the Senate Judiciary Committee. On November 14, 2024, his nomination was reported out of committee by a voice vote, with Senators Chuck Grassley, Mike Lee, Ted Cruz, Josh Hawley, Tom Cotton, John Kennedy, and Marsha Blackburn voting no. On November 21, 2024, the United States Senate confirmed his nomination by a 82–12 vote. He received his judicial commission on January 7, 2025. He is the second South Asian federal judge in Arizona, after his older sister, Judge Roopali Desai, who was confirmed to the United States Court of Appeals for the Ninth Circuit in 2022.

Legal offices
Preceded by G. Murray Snow	Judge of the United States District Court for the District of Arizona; 2025–present	Incumbent
