= Northern Virginia military shootings =

The Northern Virginia military shootings, in the U.S state of Virginia, were a series of attacks targeting military facilities at times when they were believed to be unoccupied during October and November 2010. Forensic examination of the bullets left at the various scenes confirmed that all of the shots were from the same rifle.

== Suspect ==
The person behind the attacks remained unknown until June 17, 2011, when Yonathan Melaku, a 22-year-old naturalized American from Ethiopia and Marine Corps Reserve Lance Corporal, was found at Arlington National Cemetery while it was closed. He was arrested by JBM-HH Police Sgt. Nicholas Kalenich. A search of his backpack revealed that he was carrying spent shell casings, a notebook containing references to the Taliban and Osama bin Laden, and plastic bags filled with ammonium nitrate, a common component of homemade explosives. He had no identification on him at the time of his arrest. He also left his rental vehicle parked in the woods near the Pentagon. The U.S. Park Police obtained a copy of the rental contract from the information affixed to the car key. The contract had his name listed. With the assistance of the U.S. Park Police and Federal Bureau of Investigation, they conducted a check of his name for a Virginia drivers license. Once police obtained a drivers license number, the Park Police obtained his license photograph. After the Park Police informed him of his name, date of birth, social security number, and address, he confessed to his crimes. He had also been recently charged with breaking into 27 cars in suburban Washington. The investigation of the incident connected Melaku to the shootings, and on June 23, 2011, he was charged with two counts of willfully injuring the property of the United States, for which he faces up to 20 years in prison, and two counts of using a firearm during a violent crime, for which he faces up to a life sentence, with more charges possible.

The Federal Bureau of Investigation worked with the Fairfax County Police, the Prince William County police and the Pentagon Force Protection Agency to investigate the case.

On January 11, 2013, Melaku was sentenced to 25 years in prison. This sentence was the outcome of a plea deal; afterward, Melaku retained new counsel and was diagnosed with schizophrenia, but decided to stick with the plea deal.
