= Alfredo Chavez Marquez =

American judge (1922–2014)

Alfredo Chávez Márquez

Senior Judge of the United States District Court for the District of Arizona
- In office July 25, 1991 – August 27, 2014

Judge of the United States District Court for the District of Arizona
- In office June 30, 1980 – July 25, 1991
- Appointed by: Jimmy Carter
- Preceded by: Seat established by 92 Stat. 1629
- Succeeded by: John Roll

Personal details
- Born: Alfredo Chávez Márquez; June 30, 1922 Winkelman, Arizona, U.S.
- Died: August 27, 2014 (aged 92) Tucson, Arizona, U.S.
- Party: Democratic
- Education: University of Arizona (BA); James E. Rogers College of Law (LLB)

Alfredo Chávez Márquez (June 30, 1922 – August 27, 2014) was a United States district judge of the United States District Court for the District of Arizona.

== Education and career ==
Born in Winkelman, Arizona, Marquez was an Ensign in the United States Navy during World War II, from 1942 to 1945. He then received a Bachelor of Arts degree from University of Arizona in 1948, and a Bachelor of Laws from the James E. Rogers College of Law at the University of Arizona in 1950. He was in private practice in Phoenix, Arizona from 1950 to 1951, and was an assistant state attorney general of Arizona from 1951 to 1952, and deputy county attorney of Pima County, Arizona from 1952 to 1954. He was an administrative assistant for United States Representative Stewart Udall in 1955. He was a prosecutor for the City of Tucson, Arizona from 1956 to 1957. He was then in private practice of law in Tucson from 1956 to 1980.

== Federal judicial service ==
On June 2, 1980, Marquez was nominated by President Jimmy Carter to a new seat on the United States District Court for the District of Arizona created by 92 Stat. 1629. Marquez was confirmed by the United States Senate on June 26, 1980, and received his commission on June 30, 1980. He assumed senior status on July 25, 1991. His seat was filled via the appointment of Judge John Roll. He died on August 27, 2014, in Tucson.

== See also ==
- List of Hispanic and Latino American jurists

== Sources ==
- Political Graveyard
- Arizona Daily Star Obituary

Legal offices
Preceded by Seat established by 92 Stat. 1629	Judge of the United States District Court for the District of Arizona; 1980–1991	Succeeded by John Roll
