= 2011 Tucson shooting =

Mass shooting in metro Tucson, Arizona, US

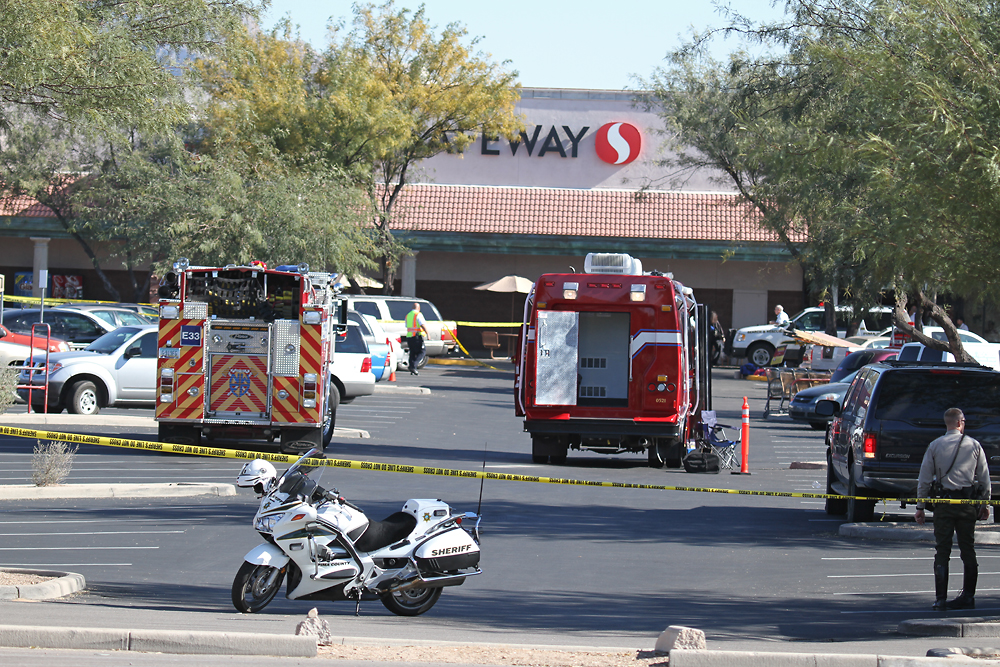
- First responders at the crime scene outside the Casas Adobes Safeway
- Location: 32°20′9.5″N 110°58′30.5″W; Casas Adobes, Arizona, near Tucson
- Date: January 8, 2011; 15 years ago 10:10 a.m. (MST; UTC−07:00)
- Target: U.S. representative Gabby Giffords
- Attack type: Mass shooting; mass murder; assassination attempt
- Weapon: Glock 19 semi-automatic pistol with a 33-round magazine (Note: Attributed to multiple sources:)
- Deaths: 6 (including federal judge John Roll)
- Injuries: 15 (including the perpetrator; 13 by gunfire, including Giffords)
- Perpetrator: Jared Lee Loughner
- Defenders: Bill Badger; Patricia Maisch; Roger Salzgeber
- Motive: Anti-government sentiment; Hatred of Gabby Giffords

On January 8, 2011, United States representative Gabby Giffords and 18 others were shot during a constituent meeting held in a supermarket parking lot in Casas Adobes, Arizona, in the Tucson metropolitan area. Six people were killed, including federal District Court chief judge John Roll; Gabe Zimmerman, one of Giffords's staffers; and a nine-year-old girl, Christina Taylor Green. Giffords was holding a meeting called "Congress on Your Corner" in the parking lot of a Safeway store when Jared Lee Loughner drew a pistol and shot her in the head at point-blank range before proceeding to fire on others. In addition to Giffords and the six deceased, twelve others were shot. News reports identified the target of the attack to be Giffords, a Democrat representing Arizona's 8th congressional district. Giffords's medical condition was initially described as "critical".

Loughner, a 22-year-old Tucson man who was fixated on Giffords, was arrested at the scene. Federal prosecutors filed five charges against him, including the attempted assassination of a member of Congress and the assassination of a federal judge. Loughner previously had been arrested on a minor drug charge and had been suspended by his college for disruptive behavior. Court filings included handwritten notes by Loughner indicating he planned to assassinate Giffords. Loughner did not cooperate with authorities, invoking his right to remain silent. He was held without bail and indicted on 49 counts. In January 2012, Loughner was found by a federal judge to be incompetent to stand trial based on two medical evaluations, which diagnosed him with paranoid schizophrenia. On August 7, Loughner had another hearing in which he was judged competent. He pleaded guilty to 19 counts, and in November 2012 was sentenced to life in prison.

Following the shooting, American and international politicians expressed grief and condemnations. Gun control advocates pushed for increased restrictions on the sale of firearms and ammunition, specifically high-capacity magazines. Some commentators criticized the use of harsh political rhetoric in the U.S., with a number blaming the political right wing for the shooting. In particular, Sarah Palin was criticized for a poster by her political action committee that featured stylized crosshairs on an electoral map that included Giffords. Palin rejected claims that she bore any responsibility for the shooting. President Barack Obama led a nationally televised memorial service on January 12, and other memorials took place.

== Shooting ==
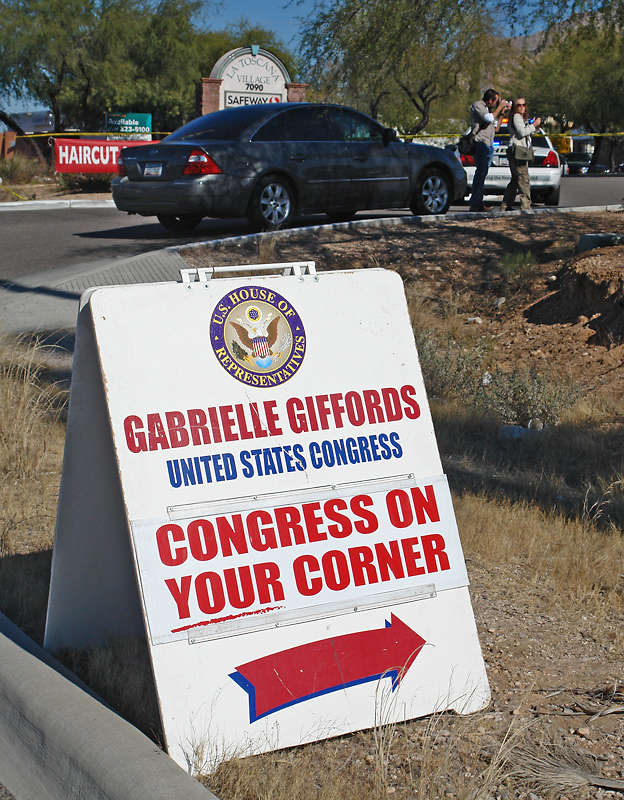
Roadside sign for the "Congress on Your Corner" constituent meeting

The shooting took place on January 8, 2011, at 10:10 A.M. MST (17:10 UTC). A United States Representative from Arizona, Gabrielle Giffords, was holding a constituent meeting called "Congress on Your Corner" at the Safeway supermarket in La Toscana Village mall, which is in Casas Adobes, a census-designated place north of Tucson. Giffords had set up a table outside the store and about 20 to 30 people were gathered around her when a 22-year-old man named Jared Lee Loughner suddenly drew a pistol and shot Giffords in the head. The shooting was caught on video by a store security camera, but was not released to the public.

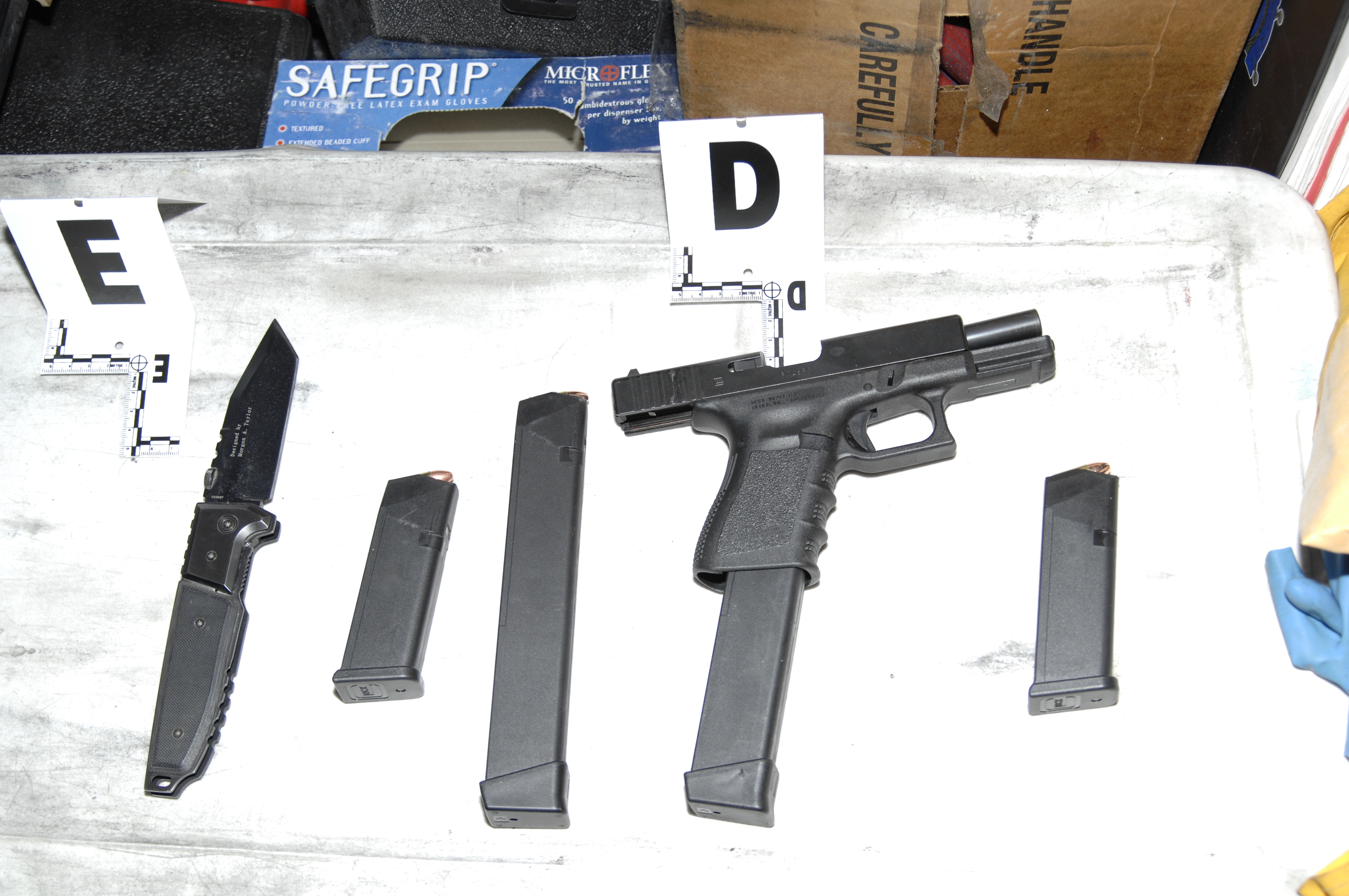
Weapons recovered from perpetrator; knife, four magazines, Glock 19

Loughner proceeded to fire apparently randomly at other members of the crowd. He was armed with a Glock 19 semi-automatic pistol with four magazines, two of which were capable of holding 33 rounds. A nearby store employee said he heard "15 to 20 gunshots". Loughner stopped to reload, but dropped the loaded magazine from his pocket to the sidewalk, from where bystander Patricia Maisch grabbed it. Another bystander, Roger Salzgeber, clubbed the back of the assailant's head with a folding chair, injuring his elbow in the process. Loughner was tackled to the ground by Bill Badger, a 74-year-old retired United States Army Colonel who had also been shot himself. Loughner was further subdued by Maisch, Salzgeber and bystander Joseph Zamudio. Zamudio, a concealed weapon (CCW) permit holder, had a weapon on his person, but arrived after the shooting had stopped and did not draw his firearm. Thirty-one shell casings were found at the scene by investigators.

The first call from the scene to emergency services was received at 10:11 A.M. While waiting for help to arrive, Giffords's intern Daniel Hernández Jr. applied pressure to the gunshot wound on her forehead, and made sure she did not choke on her blood. Hernández and local paramedic Aaron Rogers are credited with saving Giffords's life. David and Nancy Bowman, a married doctor and nurse couple who were shopping in the store, immediately set up triage and attended to nine-year-old Christina-Taylor Green. Police arrived on the scene at 10:15 A.M., with paramedics arriving at 10:16 A.M. Badger observed the assailant attempting to discard a small bag containing money and identification, which was recovered by the officers. Following the shooting, the police shut down roads surrounding the shopping center until late in the day. The intersection was cordoned off and most of the businesses in the shopping center were closed throughout the weekend during the initial investigation. The Safeway store reopened a week later, with a makeshift memorial erected near the front of the store.

Five people died at the scene, including Chief Judge John Roll and Giffords's community outreach director Gabe Zimmerman. Several of the injured were taken to University Medical Center in Tucson. Christina-Taylor Green was later pronounced dead on arrival at the hospital.

When Loughner's parents arrived at their home, unaware of the shootings, they found police tape and police cars around their house. Their neighbor Wayne Smith said Loughner's mother "almost passed out right there", while his father sat in the road and cried. Smith described the family as "devastated", feeling guilty, and wondering "where did they fail?" Loughner's parents released a statement three days later expressing remorse for the victims and saying, "We don't understand why this happened."

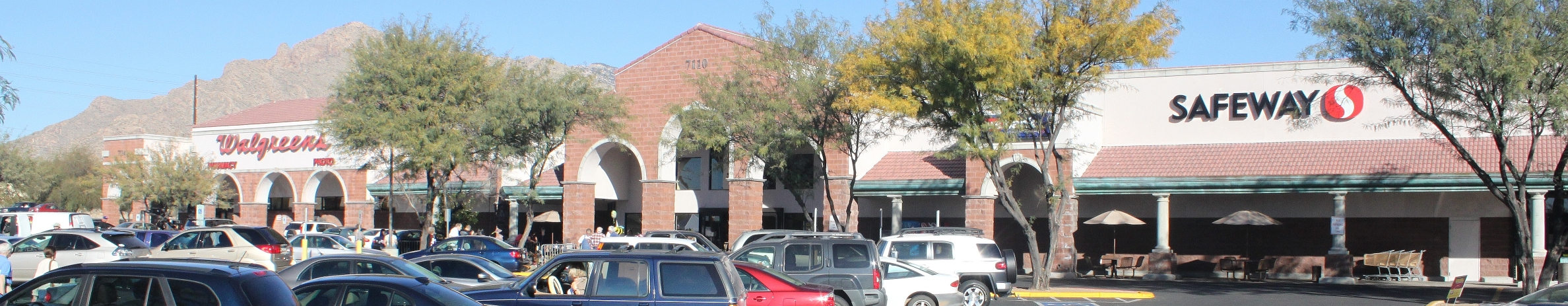
La Toscana Village mall. The attack occurred near the Safeway main entrance, which is below the gable-end.

== Investigation ==
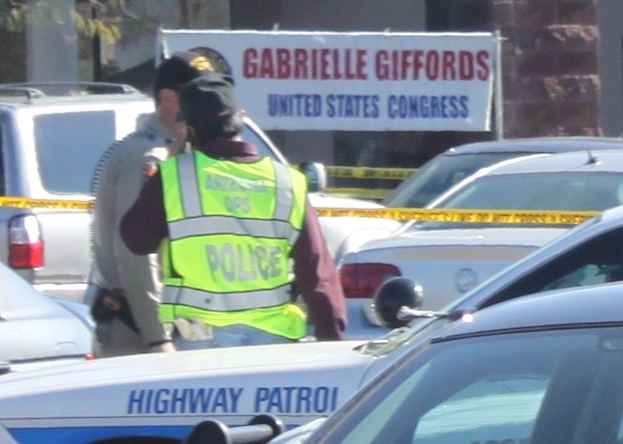
Police investigate the crime scene, seen here around two hours after the attack.

Jared Lee Loughner, the perpetrator, was described as a white male in his mid-20s who had short hair and "dressed in a shabby manner". He was arrested after being detained by bystanders, and police later released his name and details. The FBI attempted to question Loughner, but he reportedly refused to cooperate with authorities and invoked his Fifth Amendment rights. Authorities claimed that Loughner's motive was unknown. They said that evidence seized from a safe in Loughner's home included an envelope marked with notes reading "I planned ahead", "My assassination", and "Giffords", as well as a letter from Giffords's office thanking him for attending a similar event in 2007.

Federal officials charged Loughner the next day with killing federal government employees, attempting to assassinate a member of Congress and attempting to kill federal employees. Police reports reveal he had purchased a Glock pistol at a Sportsman's Warehouse store, after passing the required FBI background check, less than six weeks before and attempted to buy additional ammunition for the pistol at a Walmart on the morning of the shooting, but the clerk refused to sell it to him based on his appearance and demeanor.

As the shooting occurred outside the Tucson city limits in unincorporated Casas Adobes, the Pima County Sheriff's Department started the initial investigation with assistance from the Tucson Police Department and the Arizona Department of Public Safety. The Federal Bureau of Investigation director Robert Mueller was ordered to the location by President Obama, and the FBI took over the investigation. The United States Capitol Police also conducted an investigation.

=== Perpetrator ===
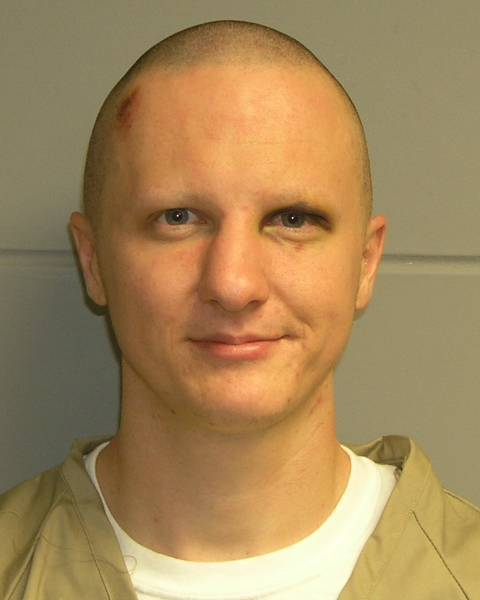
Photograph of Loughner taken by U.S. Marshals

Jared Lee Loughner, then age 22, lived with his parents Randy and Amy Loughner in Tucson, about 5 miles (8.0 km) from the site of the shooting. His mother worked for the City Parks Department; his father's work was not known. Loughner had been attending Pima Community College. Former classmates stated Loughner (at the time) cared about his education due to his appreciation of knowledge. Because of teacher and student complaints about Loughner's increasingly disruptive behavior in classes, the college suspended him on September 29, 2010, and he dropped out of the school in October. Loughner chose not to return, as the college required him to have a mental health evaluation and clearance to be readmitted.

Before the shooting, Loughner had two previous offenses, one of which was for drug possession. He had become obsessed with Giffords and had previously met her at a "Congress on your Corner" event in a Tucson mall in August 2007.

U.S. Army officials said that Loughner had attempted to enlist in 2008, but his application had been rejected as "unqualified" for service. They declined further disclosure due to confidentiality rules. An administration official indicated to the media that Loughner had failed a drug test.

Loughner had been posting material online for some time via his Myspace account and on YouTube under the name "Classitup10". He gave his views on terrorism, federal laws, and his belief that the government was brainwashing the citizenry with language. Hours before the incident, Loughner's Myspace page was updated with posts from his account stating, "Goodbye", and said to friends: "Please don't be mad at me."

On November 30, 2010, Loughner purchased a Glock 19 semi-automatic pistol at a Sportsman's Warehouse store in Tucson, passing a background check.

Earlier on the day of the shooting, Loughner reportedly had an altercation with his father regarding a black bag the younger man took from a car trunk. A bag matching the description was later found in a nearby desert area containing 9mm ammunition, and it is believed to belong to Loughner. Later that morning, at approximately 7:30 A.M., Loughner was stopped by an Arizona Game and Fish Department officer after running a red light, but was released with a warning when it was determined that he did not have any outstanding warrants.

=== Legal proceedings ===
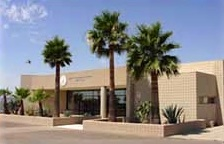
Federal Correctional Institution, Phoenix, where Loughner was being held

Loughner was held in the Federal Correctional Institution at Phoenix without bail. All Arizona-based federal judges recused themselves from the case because of their ties to Judge Roll, who was killed in the attack. The federal case was assigned to a San Diego-based jurist, federal Judge Larry Alan Burns from the United States District Court for the Southern District of California. The public defender Judy Clarke, also based in San Diego, was appointed to represent Loughner in federal court.

On January 19, 2011, a federal grand jury handed down an indictment for three counts against Loughner for the attempt to assassinate Representative Giffords, and attempting to kill two federal employees, her aides Ron Barber and Pamela Simon. Loughner was indicted on additional charges of murder and attempted murder on March 3, for a total of 49 counts.

Prosecutors representing the state of Arizona filed murder and attempted murder charges on behalf of the victims who were not federal employees. Under Arizona's speedy trial statutes, Arizona state prosecutors normally have ten days from the time a suspect is taken into custody to file charges, but time spent in federal custody does not count toward this limitation. Conviction in either federal or state court meant that Loughner could face the death penalty.

On May 25, 2011, Judge Burns found Loughner incompetent to stand trial based on two medical evaluations. These evaluations had diagnosed him with paranoid schizophrenia. Loughner was ordered to be forcibly medicated following his diagnosis of schizophrenia. A new evaluation was ordered for January 25, 2012.

On February 6, 2012, his stay at the Springfield, Missouri facility was extended by four months. A request by Loughner's lawyers to end forced medication was denied. Another competency hearing was set for June 27, 2012, but later rescheduled.

On August 7, 2012, Loughner's competency hearing began with testimony from Dr. Christina Pietz, Loughner's forensic psychologist, who testified that she believed Loughner was competent to stand trial. After hearing the evidence, Judge Burns ruled that Loughner was competent to stand trial, whereupon Loughner pleaded guilty to 19 counts.

On November 8, 2012, Loughner appeared for sentencing, with several of his victims as well as relatives of those he killed in attendance. Judge Burns sentenced Loughner to seven consecutive life terms plus 140 years in prison without parole.

After his sentencing in federal court, Pima County Attorney Barbara LaWall announced that she would not prosecute Loughner on behalf of the state of Arizona. LaWall explained that her decision would afford the victims and their families, as well as the community in Tucson and Pima County, an opportunity to move forward with their lives. She said that, after speaking and consulting personally with each of the surviving victims and with the family members of those killed, it was clear that they would not be benefitted by a state prosecution. Surviving victims and family members told LaWall that they are "completely satisfied with the federal prosecution", that "justice has been served", and that the federal sentence is "suitably severe".

== Victims ==
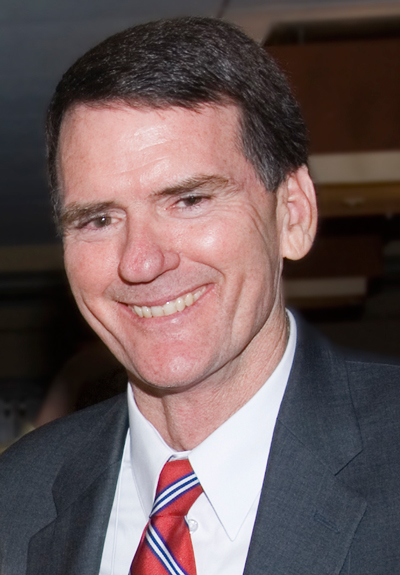
Chief Judge John Roll

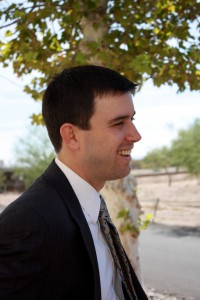
Gabe Zimmerman

Six people were killed in the attack;

- Christina-Taylor Green, 9, of Tucson. Green was accompanied to the meeting by neighbor Susan Hileman. As her date of birth was September 11, 2001, she had appeared in the book Faces of Hope: Babies Born on 9/11 (page 41). She was the granddaughter of former Major League Baseball player and manager Dallas Green and the second cousin of actress Sophia Bush.
- Dorothy "Dot" Morris, 76, a retired secretary from Oro Valley; wife of George, who was wounded.
- John Roll, 63, chief judge of the U.S. District Court for Arizona, named to the federal bench by President George H. W. Bush in 1991.
- Phyllis Schneck, 79, homemaker from Tucson.
- Dorwan Stoddard, 76, retired construction worker, died from a gunshot wound to the head; his wife Mavy was wounded.
- Gabriel "Gabe" Zimmerman, 30, community outreach director for Giffords, and a member of Giffords's staff since 2006. Zimmerman was the first Congressional staffer killed in the line of duty.

In addition to the 6 dead, 13 other people were wounded by gunshot in the attack, while a 14th person was injured subduing Loughner. Gabrielle Giffords and two other members of her staff were among the surviving gunshot victims. Staffer Ron Barber, shot in the thigh and face, would later succeed Giffords in her House seat.

=== Gabby Giffords ===
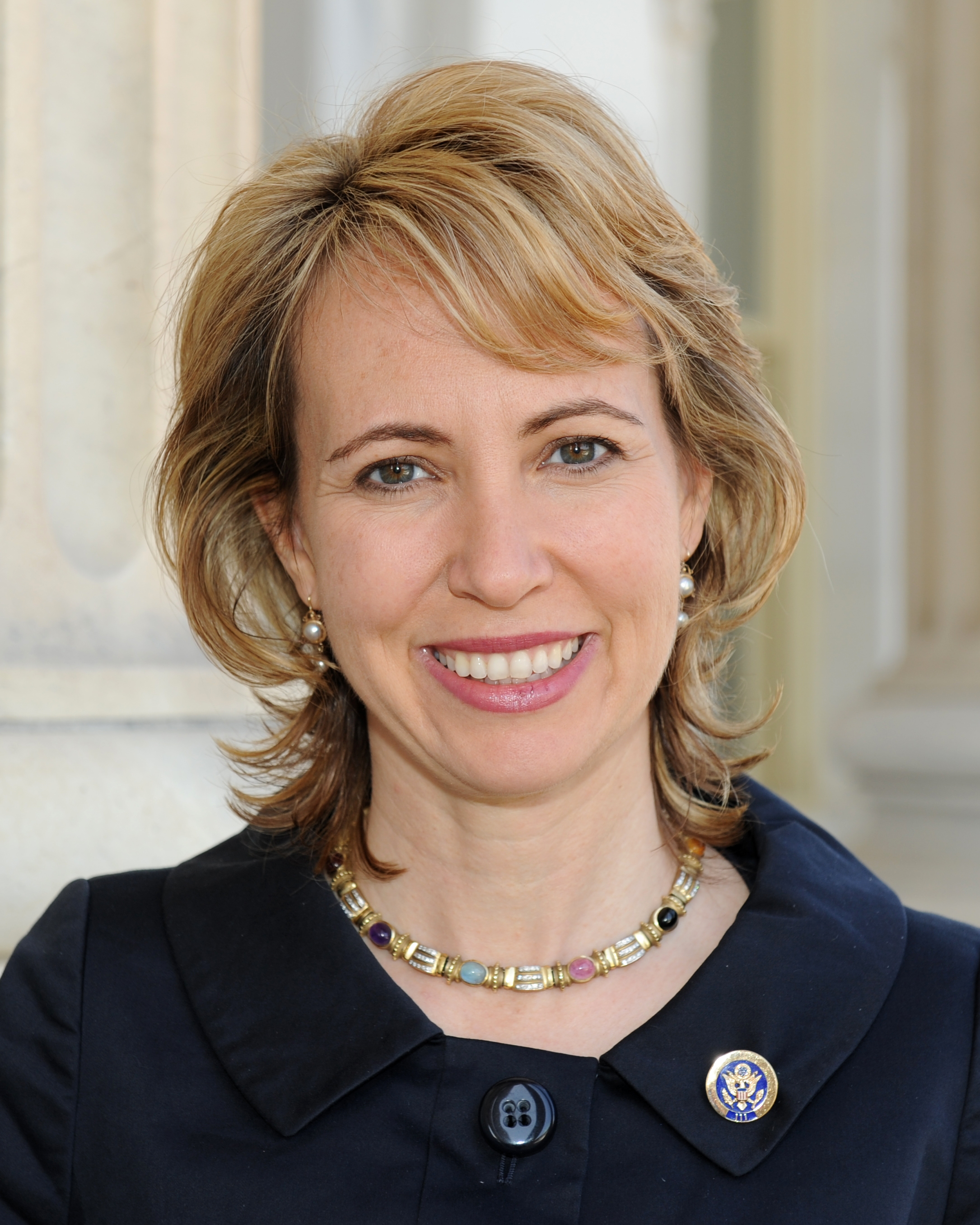
Giffords in 2010, official portrait

Gabby Giffords was reported to be the target of the shootings. Some news organizations initially reported she had been killed, but these statements were quickly revised to reflect that she had survived with a gunshot wound to the head. Daniel Hernández Jr., one of Giffords's interns, assisted her after she was wounded and is credited with saving her life.

Giffords was taken to University Medical Center in critical condition, although she was still conscious. Within 38 minutes, Giffords underwent emergency surgery, and part of her skull was removed to prevent further brain damage caused by swelling. She was placed into a medically induced coma to allow her brain to rest. During a memorial ceremony on January 12, President Obama announced that earlier that day Giffords had opened her eyes for the first time since the attack.

As Giffords's status improved, she began simple physical therapy and music therapy. On January 21, 2011, less than two weeks after the attack, her condition was deemed sufficiently stable for her to be released to Houston's Memorial Hermann Medical Center. A few days later she was moved to the center's Institute for Rehabilitation and Research to undergo a program of physical therapy and rehabilitation. After examination, her Houston doctors were optimistic, saying she has "great rehabilitation potential".

On August 1, 2011, she made her first public appearance on the House floor to vote in favor of raising the debt limit ceiling. She was met with a standing ovation and accolades from her fellow members of Congress. Giffords engaged in intensive rehabilitation treatments in Asheville, North Carolina, from October 25 through November 4. In 2011, Mark Kelly, Giffords's husband, published a memoir, Gabby: A Story of Courage and Hope, crediting her with joint authorship. He wrote that Giffords vows to return to Congress, although she continues to struggle with language and has lost 50 percent of her vision in both eyes. Kelly himself was elected U.S. Senator from Arizona in 2020.

On January 22, 2012, Giffords announced that she would resign from her congressional seat in order to concentrate on her recovery, but promised to return to public service in the future. She submitted her resignation on January 25 on the floor of the House where her colleagues and the House leadership offered their tributes to her courage and strength.

== Reaction ==
=== Political ===
In the wake of the shooting, Democrats and Republicans both called for a cooling of political rhetoric and a return to bipartisanship. On the eve of the shooting, Giffords had written to a Republican friend, Trey Grayson, Secretary of State of Kentucky, saying, "we need to figure out how to tone our rhetoric and partisanship down." In March 2010, Giffords had expressed concern about the use of crosshairs on a national midterm election map on Sarah Palin's campaign webpage denoting targeted congressional seats, including Giffords', in Arizona's 8th district. Shortly after the map's posting and the subsequent vandalizing of her office that month, Giffords said, "We're in Sarah Palin's 'targeted' list, but the thing is that the way she has it depicted, we're in the crosshairs of a gun sight over our district. When people do that, they've got to realize that there are consequences to that action." At that point in the interview, however, the interviewer said, "campaign rhetoric and war rhetoric have been interchangeable for years." The image was removed from Palin's "takebackthe20" website following the January shootings. Palin responded to her critics in a January 12 video, rejecting the notion that anyone other than the gunman could bear any responsibility for the Tucson shooting, and accusing the press of manufacturing a "blood libel" to blame her and the right wing for the attacks. No link was proven between the crosshairs map and the shooting, and it is unclear whether Loughner ever saw the map.

The political climate in the United States and in Arizona in particular was pointed to by some observers as a possible contributing factor for the violent act. For example, Clarence Dupnik, Pima County Sheriff, initially expressed concern that overheated political rhetoric and violence may be related, observing, "When you look at unbalanced people, how they respond to the vitriol that comes out of certain mouths about tearing down the government. The anger, the hatred, the bigotry that goes on in this country is getting to be outrageous." He believed that Arizona had unfortunately become "the capital" of such feelings. "We have become the mecca for prejudice and bigotry," he said. But, Dupnik later said that he had no evidence that the killings were a result of anything particular which Loughner may have read or heard. International media referred to the political climate in the United States and the Palin map in particular. The French newspaper Le Monde said that the attack seemed to confirm "an alarming premonition that has been gaining momentum for a long time: that the verbal and symbolic violence that the most radical right-wing opponents have used in their clash with the Obama administration would at some point lead to tragic physical violence." President Obama called the shooting an "unspeakable tragedy", adding that "such a senseless and terrible act of violence has no place in a free society". Arizona Governor Jan Brewer called the attack "senseless and cruel violence" and House Speaker John Boehner said, "An attack on one who serves is an attack on all who serve. Acts and threats of violence against public officials have no place in our society". Chief Justice John Roberts issued a statement noting, "we in the judiciary have suffered the terrible loss of one of our own", with the death of Chief Judge John Roll.

Political figures such as Arizona's United States Senators Jon Kyl and John McCain, House Majority Leader Eric Cantor, House Minority Leader Nancy Pelosi issued statements. Numerous foreign politicians additionally commented on the shooting, including Canadian Foreign Affairs Minister Lawrence Cannon, British Prime Minister David Cameron, Spanish Prime Minister José Luis Rodríguez Zapatero, and Cuba's Fidel Castro. The website GiffordsIsLying.com, run by Giffords's former opponent Jesse Kelly, was replaced with a single page urging support for Giffords and her family.

Senator Chuck Schumer called for a fresh look at gun control laws in the United States, including the possibility of high-capacity magazine ban, and prohibiting a person who has been rejected for military service due to drug use from owning a gun. Homeland Security Committee chairman Peter T. King announced that he would introduce a bill to ban the carrying of firearms within 1,000 feet (300 m) of certain federal officials. Representative Carolyn McCarthy announced that she would introduce legislation to ban the sale of high-capacity magazines to civilians.

=== Media ===
Some media commentators, such as Howard Kurtz and Toby Harnden, criticized what they perceived as a rush to judgment about the shooter's motivation, disputing suggestions that the shooting was the result of the Tea Party movement or anything in connection to Palin. Paul Krugman wrote an op-ed piece arguing that political rhetoric had become toxic. With renewed calls to tone down political rhetoric after the shooting, Keith Olbermann said, "Violence, or the threat of violence, has no place in our Democracy, and I apologize for and repudiate any act or any thing in my past that may have even inadvertently encouraged violence." Jon Stewart stated that he did not know whether or not the political environment contributed to the shooting, but, "For all the hyperbole and vitriol that's become a part of our political process—when the reality of that rhetoric, when actions match the disturbing nature of words, we haven't lost our capacity to be horrified. ... Maybe it helps us to remember to match our rhetoric with reality more often."

On the evening of the shooting, Fred Phelps of the Westboro Baptist Church released a video titled “Thank God for the Violent Shooter” in which he claimed the shooting to be divine retribution for prior acts of violence allegedly directed at Westboro by “criminal violent veterans”, and called Giffords “an avid supporter of sin and baby-killing.” Phelps incorrectly claimed Loughner to be an Afghanistan veteran and repeated the claim that Sarah Palin had depicted Giffords in a crosshairs on her website, calling Palin a “mouthy witch” and “cowardly brute.” He concluded that Westboro was praying for “more violence and more dead.”

=== Memorials ===
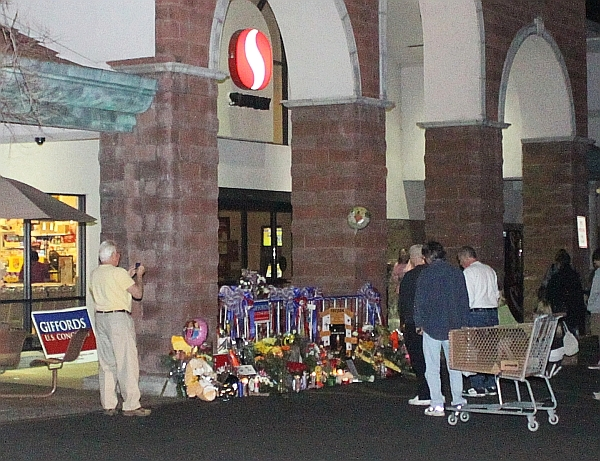
Memorial at site of shooting

U.S. flags flown by the federal government were displayed at half-staff from January 9, 2011, until sunset on January 15, 2011, in honor of the victims of the Tucson shooting. A national moment of silence was held at 11:00 a.m. EST on January 10, 2011, on the South Lawn of the White House as well as the steps of the United States Capitol. President Obama went to Tucson on January 12, where he met with the families of the victims and visited Giffords at her bedside in the medical center before attending the evening's televised memorial ceremony where he delivered a memorial speech.

When the Safeway store reopened after the shooting, the staff erected a makeshift memorial. At the 2011 Major League Baseball All-Star Game (the first to take place in Arizona), Giffords's intern, Daniel Hernandez Jr., was accompanied onto the field by the families of the shooting victims, and threw the ceremonial first pitch. For the 2011 State of the Union Address, Senator Mark Udall of Colorado proposed that members of both houses sit together regardless of party, with one seat left empty in honor of Giffords.

Christina-Taylor Green, the youngest of the victims, had an interest in politics and said that she had wanted to attend college at Penn State University; she was born in Pennsylvania and had a connection to the state through her grandfather, Dallas Green. The university honored her with a brick on the Alumni Walk on campus, and with a certificate in her memory.

=== Others ===
On the night of January 11, 2011, Governor Brewer signed emergency legislation to prohibit protests within 300 feet (91 m) of any funeral services, in response to an announcement by the Westboro Baptist Church that it planned to picket the funeral of shooting victim Christina-Taylor Green. The members of the congregation agreed to appear on talk radio in exchange for dropping their plans to picket the funeral.

On Sunday, January 16, 2011, eight days after the shooting, Vietnam War veteran James Eric Fuller, who had been shot in the knee during the attack, was arrested for disorderly conduct at a town hall meeting. After Tucson Tea Party figure Trent Humphries, who had faulted Giffords for not having enough security, stated that gun control measures should not be discussed until all those killed in the shooting were buried, Fuller allegedly took a picture of Humphries and shouted, "You're dead." In an interview during the week after the shooting, Fuller had criticized Palin and what he called the "Tea Party crime-syndicate" for promoting a divisive political climate before the attacks. The police then committed him to an undisclosed medical facility to undergo a psychiatric evaluation. A police spokesman stated that the hospital will determine when he will be released. Meanwhile, Humphries said he was worried about Fuller's threat, and the dozens of other angry e-mails he received from people blaming right-wing political rhetoric for contributing to the assassination attempt on Giffords.

== See also ==
- List of United States federal judges killed in office
- List of members of the United States Congress killed or wounded in office
- List of massacres in Arizona
- Bill Gwatney
- Murder of Jo Cox
