= John Roll =

American judge (1947–2011)

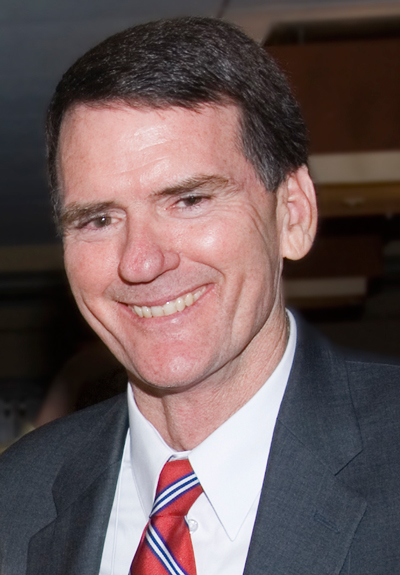
- Roll in 2007

Chief Judge of the United States District Court for the District of Arizona
- In office May 1, 2006 – January 8, 2011
- Preceded by: Stephen M. McNamee
- Succeeded by: Roslyn O. Silver

Judge of the United States District Court for the District of Arizona
- In office November 25, 1991 – January 8, 2011
- Appointed by: George H. W. Bush
- Preceded by: Alfredo Chavez Marquez
- Succeeded by: Jennifer Zipps

Personal details
- Born: John McCarthy Roll; February 8, 1947 Pittsburgh, Pennsylvania, U.S.
- Died: January 8, 2011 (aged 63) Casas Adobes, Arizona, U.S.
- Cause of death: Gunshot wound
- Party: Republican
- Spouse: Maureen Roll (m. 1973)
- Children: 3
- Education: University of Arizona (BA, JD); University of Virginia (LLM)

John McCarthy Roll (February 8, 1947 – January 8, 2011) was an American lawyer and jurist. A United States district judge, Roll served on the United States District Court for the District of Arizona from 1991 until he was killed in 2011, and as chief judge of that court from 2006 to 2011. With degrees from the University of Arizona College of Law and University of Virginia School of Law, Roll began his career as a court bailiff in Arizona and became an assistant city attorney of Tucson, Arizona in 1973. Later that year, Roll became a deputy county attorney for Pima County, Arizona until 1980, when he began serving as an Assistant United States Attorney for seven years. President George H. W. Bush appointed Roll to a federal judge seat in Arizona after Roll served four years as a state judge.

Roll was killed in the 2011 Tucson shooting while attending a constituent outreach event held by U.S. Representative Gabby Giffords in Casas Adobes, near Tucson, Arizona.

== Early life and education ==
Roll was born in Pittsburgh to a Roman Catholic family, and grew up in Arizona. He attended Salpointe Catholic High School in Tucson. Roll received his Bachelor of Arts degree from the University of Arizona in 1969, a Juris Doctor from the University of Arizona College of Law in 1972, and a Master of Laws from the University of Virginia School of Law in 1990.

== Personal life ==
Roll and his wife, Maureen, had been married for nearly 40 years at the time of his death. They had three sons. He was described as "deeply conservative", politically, and a lifelong Republican.

Roll was a Roman Catholic who attended Mass daily. He served as a lector in the sacred liturgy. He was an active member of the St. Thomas More Society and a Fourth Degree Knight of Columbus.

== Legal career ==
Roll was a bailiff for the Pima County Superior Court from 1972 to 1973. He was an assistant city attorney of Tucson in 1973, and was then a deputy county attorney of Pima County's Criminal Division from 1973 to 1980. He was a clinical instructor at the University of Arizona College of Law from 1978 to 1979, after which he served as an Assistant United States Attorney for the District of Arizona from 1980 to 1987. During that time, he was attached to an organized crime task force (1982–1986) and the Civil Division (1986–1987). After his years as an Assistant United States Attorney, he became a state judge and served on the Arizona Court of Appeals, Division Two, from 1987 to 1991, and eventually became its vice-chief judge in 1991. He also served as a judge on the Pima County Superior Court, Criminal Bench, in that year.

== Federal judge ==
Roll was nominated by President George H. W. Bush on September 23, 1991, to a seat on the United States District Court for the District of Arizona that had been vacated by Alfredo Chavez Marquez. He was confirmed by the United States Senate on November 22, 1991, and received his commission on November 25. Roll was elevated to Chief Judge on May 1, 2006, succeeding Stephen M. McNamee, and served until his death in January 2011. Roll was succeeded as chief judge by Roslyn O. Silver.

In 1994, Roll was one of several district court judges who held that provisions of the Brady Law violated the Tenth Amendment, a holding upheld by the United States Supreme Court in the related case of Printz v. United States.

In 2009, Roll ruled that the case Vicente v. Barnett could go forward. The $32 million lawsuit brought by the Mexican American Legal Defense and Education Fund (MALDEF) against Arizona rancher Roger Barnett on behalf of 16 Mexican plaintiffs charged that the plaintiffs were assaulted, threatened, and held at gunpoint by Barnett and members of his family. After Roll's ruling and prompted by several talk-radio programs, he was the subject of hundreds of complaining phone calls and death threats and he and his family were under the protection of the U.S. Marshals Service for a month. Roll declined to press charges when some of those who made threats were identified.

== Murder ==
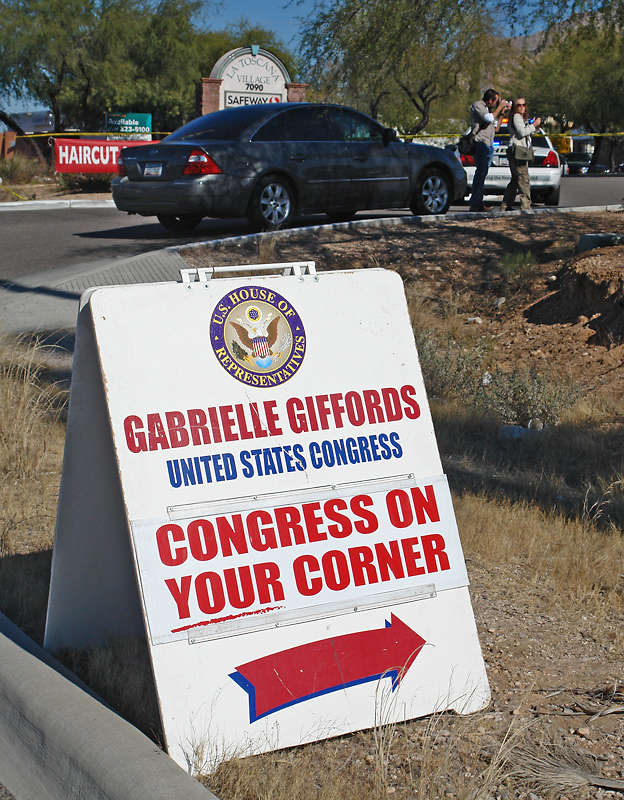
Roadside sign at the scene of the shooting

Roll was shot on January 8, 2011, outside a Safeway supermarket in Casas Adobes, Arizona, when Jared Lee Loughner opened fire at a "Congress on Your Corner" event held by Democratic U.S. Representative Gabby Giffords. Roll had attended Mass earlier that morning and decided only about an hour before the shooting to attend the event. Surveillance video revealed that Roll was shot once in the back after pushing down and shielding Ron Barber, a staffer for Giffords who had just been shot. Roll died from his injuries, as did five other people. Thirteen others were injured by gunfire, but survived, including Giffords and Barber; Barber would go on to replace Giffords when she resigned from Congress to recuperate from the injuries sustained in the shooting.

Chief Justice John Roberts issued a statement, memorializing Roll as "a wise jurist who selflessly served Arizona and the nation with great distinction, as attorney and judge, for more than 35 years", adding "his death is a somber reminder of the importance of the rule of law and the sacrifices of those who work to secure it".

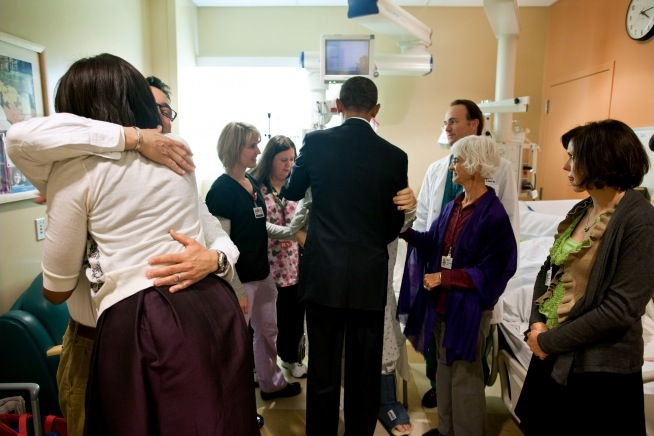
President Barack Obama visits a recovering Ron Barber, whom Roll had reportedly shielded during the shooting.

Other plaudits came from Senator John McCain, who had recommended Roll for appointment to the federal bench; from Pima County Sheriff Clarence Dupnik; and from Bishop Gerald Kicanas of the Roman Catholic Diocese of Tucson, who noted that Roll was an active parishioner who "lived his faith".

Then-Chief Judge Alex Kozinski of the United States Court of Appeals for the Ninth Circuit, whose jurisdiction included Arizona, stated that "Judge Roll was a widely respected jurist, a strong and able leader of his court, and a kind, courteous and sincere gentleman". President Barack Obama commented on Roll's death in his statement issued after the shooting, noting that Roll "served America's legal system for almost 40 years".

Jared Lee Loughner was charged by federal prosecutors with Roll's murder. Evidence gathered by federal investigators indicates that Giffords was Loughner's main target. Roll was apparently not specifically targeted – Loughner might not have even known who he was. Roll lived in the area, and had attended the event to continue a prior conversation with Giffords about the volume of cases in Arizona federal courts.

Roll was the first federal judge murdered in office since Robert Smith Vance in 1989. Chief Judge Alex Kozinski of the Ninth Circuit Court of Appeals selected Larry Alan Burns, a judge of the Southern District Court of California, to be the presiding judge over Loughner's trial, after all federal judges in Arizona recused themselves because of their ties to Roll.

== See also ==
- List of United States federal judges killed in office

Legal offices
| Preceded by Alfredo Chavez Marquez | Judge of the United States District Court for the District of Arizona; 1991–2011 | Succeeded by Jennifer Zipps |
| Preceded by Stephen M. McNamee | Chief Judge of the United States District Court for the District of Arizona; 2006–2011 | Succeeded by Roslyn O. Silver |
