= List of minority attorneys general in the United States =

This is a list of minority attorneys general in the United States. In the United States, an ethnic minority is anyone who has at least one parent who is not of non-Hispanic white descent (such as African Americans, Asian Americans, Pacific Islands Americans, Hispanic and Latino Americans, or Native Americans). Ethnic minorities currently constitute around 41% of the total population.

== List of ethnic-minority federal attorneys general ==
Denotes incumbent attorney general
- Italics denotes acting attorney general

Portrait	Name	Minority ethnicity	Party	Took office	Left office	President(s)
	Eric Holder	African American; Barbadian American	Democratic	January 20, 2001	February 2, 2001	George W. Bush
	Eric Holder	African American; Barbadian American	Democratic	February 3, 2009	April 27, 2015	Barack Obama
	Alberto Gonzales	Mexican American	Republican	February 3, 2005	September 17, 2007	George W. Bush
	Loretta Lynch	African American	Democratic	April 27, 2015	January 20, 2017	Barack Obama

== List of ethnic-minority state attorneys general ==
Denotes incumbent attorney general
- Italics denotes acting attorney general

Picture	Name	Ethnicity	Party	State	Term start	Term end	Notes
	Robert B. Elliott	African American; Afro-Caribbean	Republican	South Carolina	December 14, 1876	May 29, 1877	Election disputed as part of 1876-77 South Carolina Government Dispute, forced out of office after the Compromise of 1877 ended Reconstruction
	Miguel A. Otero III	Mexican American	Republican	New Mexico	1929	1930	
	Filo M. Sedillo	Mexican American	Democratic	New Mexico	1939	1940	
	Joe L. Martínez	Mexican American	Democratic	New Mexico	1949	1952	
	Shiro Kashiwa	Japanese American		Hawaii	1959	1960	
	Bert T. Kobayashi	Japanese American		Hawaii	1962	1969	Retired
	Edward Brooke	African American	Republican	Massachusetts	January 3, 1963	January 3, 1967	Retired to run successfully for U.S. Senate seat from Massachusetts
	Bertram Kanbara	Japanese American		Hawaii	1969	1971	Resigned to accept appointment to Supreme Court of Hawaii
	George Tai Hee Pai	Chinese American		Hawaii	1971	1971	
	Ronald Amemiya	Japanese American	Democratic	Hawaii	1974	1978	
	Toney Anaya	Mexican American	Democratic	New Mexico	January 1, 1975	January 1, 1979	Retired to run unsuccessfully for U.S. Senate
	Wayne Minami	Japanese American	Democratic	Hawaii	1978	1981	
	Tany S. Hong	Korean American	Democratic	Hawaii	1981	1984	
	Corinne Watanabe	Japanese American	Democratic	Hawaii	1985	1986	
	Larry Echo Hawk	Native American (Pawnee)	Democratic	Idaho	January 7, 1991	January 2, 1995	Retired to run unsuccessfully for Governor of Idaho
	Dan Morales	Mexican American	Democratic	Texas	January 15, 1991	January 13, 1999	Retired
	Roland Burris	African American	Democratic	Illinois	January 14, 1991	January 9, 1995	Retired to run unsuccessfully for Governor of Illinois
	Pamela Carter	African American	Democratic	Indiana	January 13, 1993	January 16, 1997	Lost reelection
	Thurbert Baker	African American	Democratic	Georgia	June 1, 1997	January 10, 2011	Retired to run unsuccessfully for Governor of Georgia
	Patricia A. Madrid	Mexican American	Democratic	New Mexico	January 1, 1999	January 1, 2007	Term limited, ran unsuccessfully for U.S. Congress in New Mexico's 1st district
	Ken Salazar	Mexican American	Democratic	Colorado	January 12, 1999	January 3, 2005	Retired to run successfully for U.S. Senate seat from Colorado
	Earl I. Anzai	Japanese American	Democratic	Hawaii	1999	2002	
	Karen Freeman-Wilson	African American	Democratic	Indiana	June 8, 2000	January 14, 2001	Was appointed as interim AG, lost reelection
	Brian Sandoval	Mexican American	Republican	Nevada	January 6, 2003	October 26, 2005	Retired to become a federal judge on the United States District Court for the District of Nevada
	Peter C. Harvey	African American	Democratic	New Jersey	June 16, 2003	January 30, 2006	Retired
	Catherine Cortez Masto	Mexican American	Democratic	Nevada	January 1, 2007	January 5, 2015	Term limited; ran successfully for U.S. Senate seat from Nevada
	Kamala Harris	African American; Indian American; Jamaican American	Democratic	California	January 3, 2011	January 3, 2017	Retired to run successfully for U.S. Senate from California
	David M. Louie	Chinese American	Democratic	Hawaii	January 2011	December 1, 2014	Retired
	Sean Reyes	Filipino American; Native Hawaiian; Japanese American	Republican	Utah	December 14, 2013	January 6, 2025	Retired
	Russell Suzuki	Japanese American	Democratic	Hawaii	December 1, 2014	March 12, 2015	Acting
	Russell Suzuki	Japanese American	Democratic	Hawaii	February 2, 2018	January 3, 2019	
	Hector Balderas	Mexican American	Democratic	New Mexico	January 1, 2015	January 1, 2023	Term limited
	Karl Racine	African American; Haitian American	Democratic	District of Columbia	January 2, 2015	January 2, 2023	Retired
	Doug Chin	Chinese American	Democratic	Hawaii	March 12, 2015	February 2, 2018	Ascended to Lieutenant Governor's office
	Curtis Hill	African American	Republican	Indiana	January 9, 2017	January 11, 2021	Lost renomination
	Xavier Becerra	Mexican American	Democratic	California	January 24, 2017	March 18, 2021	Retired to become U.S. Secretary of Health and Human Services
	Gurbir Grewal	Indian American	Democratic	New Jersey	January 16, 2018	July 19, 2021	Retired to become Enforcement Director at the Securities & Exchange Commission
	Letitia James	African American	Democratic	New York	January 1, 2019	Incumbent	
	Kwame Raoul	African American; Haitian American	Democratic	Illinois	January 14, 2019	Incumbent	
	Aaron Ford	African American	Democratic	Nevada	January 7, 2019	Incumbent	
	Keith Ellison	African American	Democratic	Minnesota	January 7, 2019	Incumbent	
	William Tong	Chinese American; Taiwanese American	Democratic	Connecticut	January 9, 2019	Incumbent	
	Daniel Cameron	African American	Republican	Kentucky	December 17, 2019	January 1, 2024	Retired to run unsuccessfully for Governor of Kentucky
	Rob Bonta	Filipino American	Democratic	California	April 23, 2021	Incumbent	
	Holly Shikada	Japanese American	Democratic	Hawaii	December 10, 2021	December 5, 2022	
	Jason Miyares	Cuban American	Republican	Virginia	January 15, 2022	January 17, 2026	Lost reelection
	Raúl Torrez	Hispanic American	Democratic	New Mexico	January 1, 2023	Incumbent	
	Raúl Labrador	Puerto Rican	Republican	Idaho	January 2, 2023	Incumbent	
	Anthony Brown	African American; Jamaican American	Democratic	Maryland	January 3, 2023	Incumbent	
	Andrea Campbell	African American	Democratic	Massachusetts	January 18, 2023	Incumbent	
	Angela Colmenero	Hispanic American	Republican	Texas	July 10, 2023	September 16, 2023	Interim AG during Ken Paxton's impeachment trial
	Nicholas Brown	African American	Democratic	Washington	January 15, 2025	Incumbent	

=== Territorial attorneys general ===
Several attorneys general of U.S. territories have been ethnic minorities. Many of these officials were appointed before elections were instituted in these jurisdictions. In each of the five current U.S. territories, Hispanic or non-white ethnic groups make up large majorities: Puerto Rican Hispanic Americans in Puerto Rico, African Americans in the U.S. Virgin Islands, Chamorros in Guam and the Northern Mariana Islands, and Samoans in American Samoa. Elected attorneys general and some appointed attorneys general in these territories that have come from these majority ethnic groups are not listed here; for more details see the lists in the articles for Secretary of Justice of Puerto Rico, Attorney General of the United States Virgin Islands, Attorney General of Guam, Attorney General of the Northern Mariana Islands, and Attorney General of American Samoa.

Denotes incumbent attorney general
- Italics denotes acting attorney general

Picture	Name	Ethnicity	Party	State	Term start	Term end	Notes
	Michiro Watanabe	Japanese American		Territory of Hawaii	March 1, 1952	March 2, 1953	Retired
	Shiro Kashiwa	Japanese American		Territory of Hawaii	May 8, 1957	June 8, 1957	Would again serve as AG after Hawaii attained statehood
	Herbert Choy	Korean American		Territory of Hawaii	June 13, 1957	November 30, 1958	
	Jack H. Mizuha	Japanese American	Republican	Territory of Hawaii	December 16, 1958	1959	Resigned to accept appointment to the Circuit Court
	Luis Sánchez Betances	Dominican American		Puerto Rico	January 2, 2013	December 28, 2013	Resigned
	Douglas Moylan	Native Hawaiian; Chinese American	Republican	Guam	January 6, 2003	January 3, 2007	Retired
	Douglas Moylan	Native Hawaiian; Chinese American	Republican	Guam	January 18, 2023	Incumbent	

== See also ==
- Governor (United States)
- List of current United States governors
- List of United States governors born outside the United States
- List of minority governors and lieutenant governors in the United States
