= Solicitor General of Hawaii =

Appellate Lawyer for American State

- Incumbent; Kalikoʻonālani D. Fernandes since June 2023
- Hawaii Department of Attorney General

The Hawaii Solicitor General or Solicitor General of Hawaii is the top appellate lawyer for the State of Hawaii. It is an appointed position within the Hawaii Department of the Attorney General, with supervision over all of the office's major appellate cases and amicus briefs. The majority of the matters that the Solicitor General handles are argued in the United States Supreme Court, the Hawaii Supreme Court, the United States Court of Appeals for the Ninth Circuit, and the Hawaii Intermediate Court of Appeals.

== Creation ==
The office of Hawaii Solicitor General was created in 2007 by then Attorney General Mark J. Bennett, who selected then Supervisor of the Appellate Division Dorothy Sellers to become Hawaii’s first Solicitor General.

== List of Solicitors General ==
The current Hawaii Solicitor General is Kalikoʻonālani D. Fernandes.

Years	Hawaii Solicitor General	Hawaii Attorney General
2007–2010	Dorothy Sellers	Mark J. Bennett
2011–2016	Girard D. Lau	David M. Louie Russell Suzuki (Acting AG) Doug Chin
2017–2019	Clyde J. Wadsworth	Doug Chin Russell Suzuki Clare E. Connors
2019–2023	Kimberly Tsumoto Guidry	Clare E. Connors Holly Shikada Anne E. Lopez
2023–present	Kalikoʻonālani D. Fernandes	Anne E. Lopez
