= Sandra Day O'Connor United States Courthouse =

Federal courthouse in Phoenix, Arizona

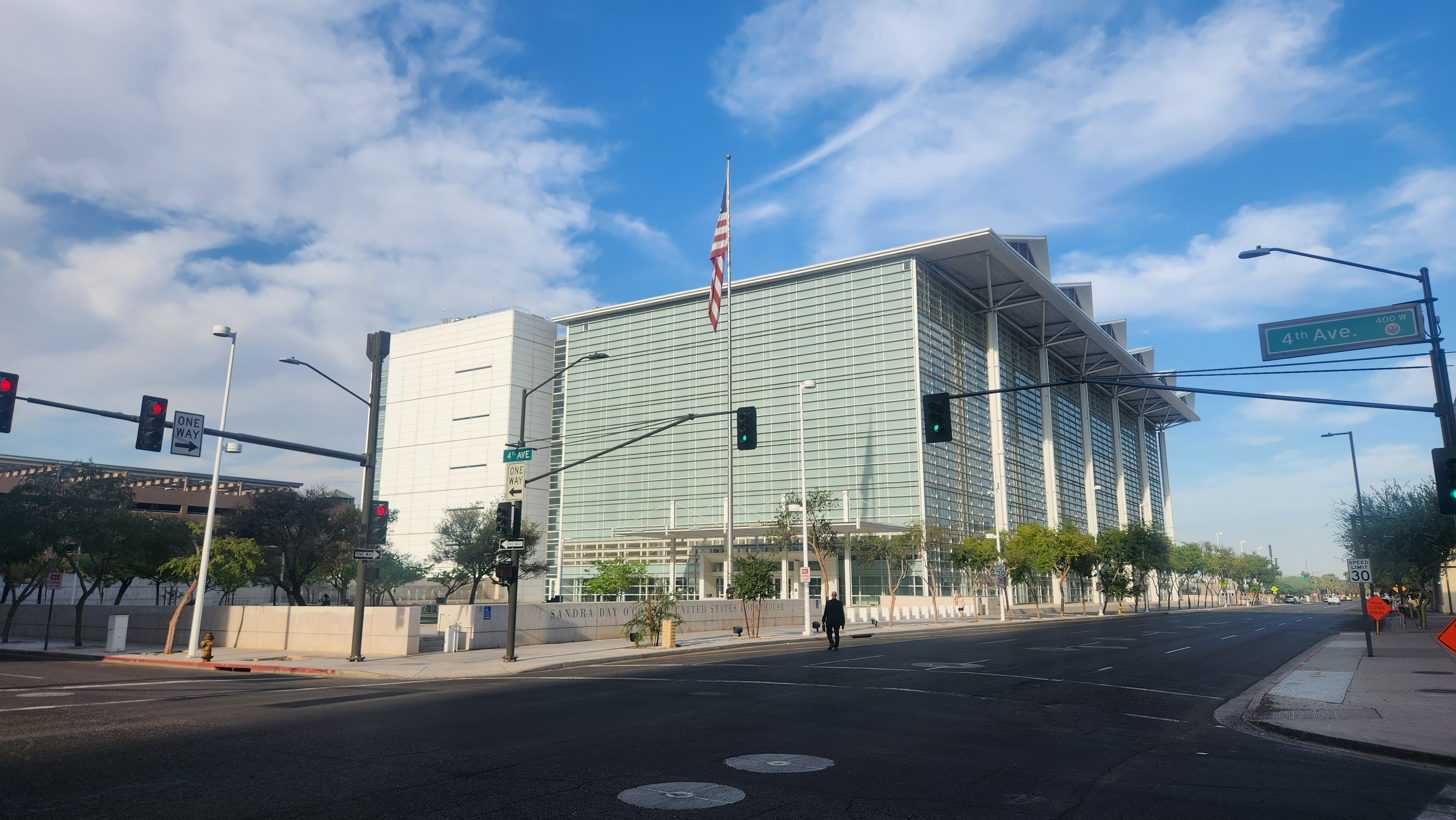
- Interactive map of the Sandra Day O'Connor United States Courthouse area

General information
- Status: Completed
- Type: Courthouse
- Location: 401 West Washington Street, Phoenix, Arizona, United States
- Coordinates: 33°26′52″N 112°4′50″W
- Current tenants: • United States Court of Appeals for the Ninth Circuit • United States District Court for the District of Arizona
- Inaugurated: October 2000
- Cost: $123 million

Technical details
- Floor count: Six
- Floor area: 550,000 square feet (51,000 m^{2})

Design and construction
- Architects: • Richard Meier • Langdon Wilson Architecture

Other information
- Parking: No public parking

The Sandra Day O'Connor United States Courthouse is a courthouse at 401 West Washington Street in Phoenix, Arizona. Pursuant to Pub. L. 106–166 (text) (PDF), enacted by the United States Congress, it is named after Sandra Day O'Connor, who served as an Associate Justice of the Supreme Court of the United States from September 21, 1981, to January 31, 2006.

== Description ==
The building is home to the United States District Court for the District of Arizona, and also hosts Circuit Judges William C. Canby Jr.; Michael Daly Hawkins; Mary H. Murguia; Mary M. Schroeder; Andrew D. Hurwitz; Barry G. Silverman; Bridget S. Bade and Roopali Desai of the United States Court of Appeals for the Ninth Circuit.

Built at a cost of $123 million and dedicated in October 2000, the building was championed by Senior United States District Judge Robert C. Broomfield. It was designed by architect Richard Meier, with local executive architects of Langdon Wilson Architecture in Phoenix. The building is in Meier's signature monochrome style. Standing six stories tall, it encompasses more than 550,000 square feet (51,000 m^{2}). The building's public atrium features a six-story glass curtain wall on the north face, and contains a drum-shaped special-proceedings courtroom with a glass-lens ceiling, the work of James Carpenter, an American light artist and designer. There is no public parking.

=== Climate-control problems ===
Although part of the General Services Administration's initiative to bring design excellence to public buildings, the building has been plagued with climate-control problems with its evaporative-cooling system. Temperatures in the atrium have been known to reach 100 °F (38 °C) in the summer, and the ceiling was open to dust storms, but now motorized louvers prevent infiltration during storms.

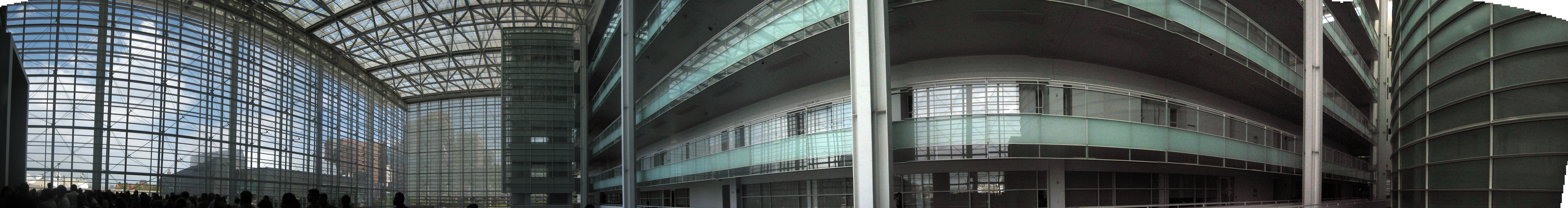
Inside the Sandra Day O'Connor United States Courthouse (August 2007)

== See also ==
- 2000 in architecture
- List of United States federal courthouses
