= Washington v. Trump (2017) =

Lawsuit challenging Executive Order 13769

- Court: United States Court of Appeals for the Ninth Circuit
- Full case name: State of Washington; State of Minnesota, Plaintiffs-Appellees, v. Donald J. Trump, President of the United States; U.S. Department of Homeland Security; Rex W. Tillerson, Secretary of State; John F. Kelly, Secretary of the Department of Homeland Security; United States of America, Defendants-Appellants.
- Argued: February 7, 2017
- Decided: February 9, 2017
- Citation: 847 F.3d 1151; 2017 U.S. App. LEXIS 2369

Case history
- Prior history: Temporary restraining order granted, 2017 U.S. Dist. LEXIS 16012 (W.D. Wash. February 3, 2017)
- Subsequent history: Appeal dismissed, 853 F.3d 933, 2017 U.S. App. LEXIS 4572 (9th Cir. Wash., March 15, 2017); rehearing en banc denied, Washington v. Trump, 858 F.3d 1168, 2017 U.S. App. LEXIS 4838 (9th Cir. Wash. March 17, 2017)

Holding
- The government did not meet its burden to justify a stay of an order preliminarily enjoining enforcement of Executive Order 13769.

Court membership
- Judges sitting: William C. Canby, Richard R. Clifton, and Michelle T. Friedland, Circuit Judges.

Case opinions
- Per curiam

State of Washington and State of Minnesota v. Trump, 847 F.3d 1151 (9th Cir. 2017), was a lawsuit that challenged the constitutionality of Executive Order 13769, issued by U.S. president Donald Trump.

A few days after the executive order was signed, on January 27, 2017, the state of Washington filed a suit alleging that it abrogated the equal protection under the law guaranteed in the Fifth Amendment to the United States Constitution by discriminating among residents of the state according to their nation of origin or religion. The lawsuit also alleged that the order violated the Establishment Clause of the First Amendment by disfavoring Islam and favoring Christianity. The federal government argued that the Constitution granted the president "unreviewable authority" over immigration matters and that the non-citizens the executive order affected did not have due process rights.

On February 3, 2017, Judge James Robart issued a nationwide temporary restraining order which forbade the federal government from enforcing certain provisions of the order. The federal government, in turn, filed an appeal with the United States Court of Appeals for the Ninth Circuit. That court, however, denied the government's request to stay the temporary restraining order as the federal government failed to show it was likely to succeed at trial, thereby maintaining the prohibition on the government in enforcing the executive order.

== Background ==
Hearing and bench ruling on the issuance of the temporary restraining order

During his initial election campaign, Trump had proposed a temporary, conditional, and "total and complete" ban on Muslims entering the United States. His proposal was met by opposition by U.S. politicians. Mike Pence and James Mattis were among those who opposed the proposal. On June 12, in reference to the 2016 Orlando nightclub shooting that occurred on the same date, Trump, via Twitter, renewed his call for a Muslim immigration ban. On June 13, Trump proposed to suspend immigration from "areas of the world" with a history of terrorism, a change from his previous proposal to suspend Muslim immigration to the U.S; the campaign did not announce the details of the plan at the time, but Jeff Sessions, an advisor to the Trump campaign on immigration, said the proposal was a statement of purpose to be supplied with details in subsequent months. In a speech on August 31, 2016, Trump vowed to "suspend the issuance of visas" to "places like Syria and Libya." Donald Trump was elected president of the United States and inaugurated on January 20, 2017. A week later on January 27, he signed the executive order. Affected travelers immediately began filing legal challenges to the order through habeas corpus petitions and injunctive relief.

On January 30, 2017, the State of Washington — represented by Washington State Attorney General Bob Ferguson, with the support of Washington Governor Jay Inslee—filed a civil action in the United States District Court for the Western District of Washington, against Trump and the U.S. Department of Homeland Security. The state's suit asked the court for declaratory relief (a declaration that the executive order violates the Constitution) and injunctive relief (to block enforcement of the executive order). The state also filed a motion for a temporary restraining order, seeking an immediate halt to the executive order's implementation. On February 1, 2017, an amended complaint was filed adding the State of Minnesota as a plaintiff alongside Washington.

== District Court proceedings ==
The State of Washington alleged nine causes of action in its original complaint. A tenth cause of action was added in the amended complaint filed by Washington and Minnesota.

| No. | Cause of action | Authority |
|---|---|---|
| 1 | That the executive order violates the Due Process Clause of the Fifth Amendment by denying the equal protection of the laws | Fifth Amendment, Fourteenth Amendment |
| 2 | That the executive order violates the Establishment Clause of the First Amendment by preferring one religion over another | First Amendment |
| 3 | That the executive order violates the Fifth Amendment right to procedural due process | Fifth Amendment |
| 4 | That the executive order's discriminatory visa procedures violate the Immigration and Nationality Act | Immigration and Nationality Act |
| 5 | That the denial of asylum and withholding of removal violate the Immigration and Nationality Act | Immigration and Nationality Act |
| 6 | That the executive order violates federal statutory law (Foreign Affairs Reform and Restructuring Act of 1998, 8 U.S.C. § 1231, implementing the United Nations Convention against Torture (ratified by the U.S. in 1994)) | Foreign Affairs Reform and Restructuring Act of 1998, United Nations Convention against Torture |
| 7 | That the executive order violates the Religious Freedom Restoration Act | Religious Freedom Restoration Act |
| 8 | That the executive order is a procedural violation of the Administrative Procedure Act | Administrative Procedure Act |
| 9 | That the executive order is a substantive violation of the Administrative Procedure Act. | Administrative Procedure Act |
| 10 | That the executive order violates the Tenth Amendment. | Tenth Amendment. |

The Government argued that the federal courts do not have the authority to review executive actions regarding immigration because the Constitution gives the President of the United States "unreviewable authority" over immigration matters.

On February 3, 2017, Judge James Robart issued a temporary restraining order enjoining the enforcement of the executive order nationwide, and entered a temporary ban regarding immigration restrictions, then directed the parties to the action to file any briefs in support of a preliminary injunction by February 6, 2017. White House Press Secretary Sean Spicer said in a statement "At the earliest possible time, the Department of Justice intends to file an emergency stay of this outrageous order and defend the executive order of the President, which we believe is lawful and appropriate. The President's order is intended to protect the homeland and he has the constitutional authority and responsibility to protect the American people." Spicer immediately issued an updated statement removing the word 'outrageous'.

During the proceedings, Judge Robart requested the defense provide statistics on the number of arrests of nationals from the seven countries since 9/11, thus supporting their burden of proof. The defense failing to provide such evidence forced Robart to incorrectly conclude no extremist arrests had occurred.

Trump responded by tweeting, "The opinion of this so-called judge, which essentially takes law-enforcement away from our country, is ridiculous and will be overturned!" Senate Minority Leader Chuck Schumer said that the President showed "a disdain for an independent judiciary that doesn't always bend to his wishes and a continued lack of respect for the Constitution, making it more important that the Supreme Court serve as an independent check on the administration. With each action testing the Constitution, and each personal attack on a judge, President Trump raises the bar even higher for Judge Gorsuch's nomination to serve on the Supreme Court. His ability to be an independent check will be front and center throughout the confirmation process."

On February 13, Judge Robart issued a preliminary injunction on the executive order. The District Court stated in its order that since the 9th Circuit Court had ruled the TRO would be treated as a preliminary injunction, the Court need not continue briefing on the request for preliminary injunction, but instead directed the parties to commence discovery proceedings, stating in his order the matters bound up in the TRO/injunction were on appeal to the 9th Circuit Court of Appeals.

On March 13, 2017, the Washington State Attorney General filed a second amended complaint addressing executive order 13780 and moved the court to enjoin enforcement of the order under the current preliminary injunction previously issued which barred enforcement of executive order 13769 by filing a motion for emergency enforcement of the preliminary injunction. The State of Washington in their second amended complaint asked the Court to Declare that Sections 3(c), 5(a)–(c), and 5(e) of the First Executive Order 13769 are unauthorized by and contrary to the Constitution and laws of the United States, and that the United States should be enjoined from implementing or enforcing Sections 3(c), 5(a)–(c), and 5(e) of the First Executive Order, including at all United States borders, ports of entry, and in the issuance of visas, pending further orders from this Court. The State of Washington also asked the Court to declare that Sections 2(c) and 6(a) of the Second Executive Order 13780 are unauthorized by and contrary to the Constitution and laws of the United States, and that the United States should also be enjoined from implementing or enforcing Sections 2(c) and 6(a) of the Second Executive Order 13780, including at all United States borders, ports of entry, and in the issuance of visas, and enjoin the United States from implementing or enforcing Section 5(d) of the First Executive Order 13769 and enjoin the United States from implementing or enforcing Section 6(b) of the Second Executive Order 13780. The Court subsequently issued an order directing the United States to file a response to the emergency motion to enforce the preliminary injunction by March 14, 2017.

== Ninth Circuit proceedings ==
Oral argument before the 9th circuit

On February 4, 2017, the United States filed an emergency motion in the U.S. Court of Appeals for the Ninth Circuit, seeking a stay of the District Court's temporary restraining order. In its request, the federal government contended that the temporary restraining order should be stayed because the judicial branch lacks the authority to review presidential actions over immigration. The 9th Circuit denied the request for an immediate stay and scheduled oral arguments.

A three-judge motions panel of the Ninth Circuit heard oral argument on the federal government's motion for a stay on February 7. The panel consisted of Judges William Canby, Richard Clifton, and Michelle Friedland. The arguments were live streamed as is typical for the 9th Circuit but rare in other federal courts. Washington Solicitor General Noah Purcell represented the plaintiff-appellee states of Washington and Minnesota. Lawyers August Flentje and Edwin Kneedler represented the U.S. government to defend the order, replacing Acting Associate Attorney General Chad Readler and Acting Solicitor General Noel Francisco, whom the Trump administration removed from that role just hours before the February 7 hearing.

=== Amici curiae and proposed intervenors ===
On February 5, a group of 97 companies, mostly from the tech industry, filed an amicus brief opposing the executive order. Companies that signed onto the amicus included Airbnb, Uber, Twitter, Google, Facebook, Apple, Microsoft, Dropbox, eBay, GoPro, Lyft, Spotify, Yelp and Levi Strauss & Co. Additional amicus briefs were filed by the Fred T. Korematsu Center for Law and Equality at Seattle University, the ACLU, and a group of law professors and law school clinicians.

On the same day, the State of Hawaii filed a motion to intervene in the case on the side of Minnesota and Washington. The motion, prepared by Hawaii Attorney General Doug Chin, former acting Solicitor General Neal Katyal, and others, states that the executive order halted tourism in Hawaii "from the banned countries, and chilled tourism from many more, threatening one of the pillars of the state's economy. It prevented a number of Hawaii's residents from traveling abroad. It required Hawaii to participate in discrimination against members of the Muslim faith." However, the court denied the motion to intervene. Hawaii has filed its own suit, in the U.S. District Court for the District of Hawaii.

On February 6, a group of former top U.S. foreign policy, national security and intelligence officials filed a joint declaration in support of Washington and Minnesota. The group stated that the executive order "cannot be justified on national security or foreign policy grounds"; was "ill-conceived, poorly implemented and ill-explained"; and injures U.S. interests. Madeleine Albright, Avril Haines, Michael Hayden, John Kerry, John E. McLaughlin, Lisa Monaco, Michael Morell, Janet Napolitano, Leon Panetta, and Susan Rice signed the declaration.

On the same day, amicus briefs in support of the challenge were filed by Americans United for Separation of Church and State and the Southern Poverty Law Center; HIAS; the Anti-Defamation League; the Service Employees International Union (SEIU); and a group of four constitutional scholars (Kristin Collins, Judith Resnik, Stephen I. Vladeck, and Burt Neuborne).

Also on February 6, an amicus brief in support of the challenge was filed by 15 states and the District of Columbia, represented by their respective attorneys general. The states signing on to the brief were New York, California, Connecticut, Delaware, Illinois, Iowa, Maine, Maryland, Massachusetts, New Mexico, Oregon, Pennsylvania, Rhode Island, Vermont, and Virginia. This followed the release of a joint statement by the attorneys general calling the executive order "unconstitutional, un-American and unlawful."

State of Washington & State of Minnesota v. Trump

Abandonment of defense of the executive order by Trump Justice Department

On February 7, New Hampshire and North Carolina as represented by their respective attorneys general joined the amicus brief in support of the challenge. This brings the total states in support of the challenge to 17 in addition to the District of Columbia. Also on February 7, 45 additional companies and 14 startups also joined the tech industry amicus brief in support of the challenge. Notable companies include Adobe, Akamai, GoDaddy, HP Inc, SpaceX, and Tesla. This brings the total number of companies in support of the challenge to 156.

=== Denial of stay ===
On February 9, the three-judge panel of the Ninth Circuit, in a per curiam decision, unanimously denied the request for a stay of the temporary restraining order. The court, quoting the Supreme Court case Nken v. Holder, made clear that "a stay is not a matter of right, even if irreparable injury might otherwise result." Because of this, the court needed to answer four questions under Nken, with the first two being most important: "(1) whether the stay applicant has made a strong showing that he is likely to succeed on the merits; (2) whether the applicant will be irreparably injured absent a stay; (3) whether issuance of the stay will substantially injure the other parties interested in the proceedings; and (4) where the public interest lies." The court denied the stay as they found the federal government failed to prove the first two questions, and that the last two tip in favor of the plaintiffs, Washington and Minnesota.

The court ruled that the federal government is unlikely to succeed on the merits against Washington's due process claim. Though the court discussed Washington State's contention that the executive order violates the First Amendment prohibition on religious discrimination, they withheld ruling on that claim, as being unlikely to succeed against a due process claim is sufficient to fail the first question. The federal government did not provide evidence or argument as to why the executive order needed to be enacted immediately and thus a stay required. In showing the federal government was unlikely to succeed on the merits against a due process claim, the court argued that it showed the States and their citizens would be irreparably harmed by a stay as "the deprivation of constitutional rights 'unquestionably constitutes irreparable injury.'" The court found that "aspects of the public interest favor both sides", but that in light of the prior three questions, "these competing public inteterests do not justify a stay."

=== En banc proceedings ===
The day after the denial of stay, the 9th Circuit ordered the parties to submit supplemental briefs on whether the motion should be reheard en banc. The order was issued at the request of an unidentified judge of the Ninth Circuit to be voted on by all 25 active judges (though, if successful, a rehearing would be by a panel of 11 judges). The parties were instructed to submit their briefs by February 16. On February 16, the Trump administration asked to postpone further proceedings because they expected to replace executive order with a new one the following week. In response, the 9th Circuit issued an order on the same day staying the en banc review of its previous ruling.

=== Dismissal of the appeal ===
On March 6, 2017, President Trump issued Executive Order 13780, which revoked and replaced Executive Order 13769 (at issue in this appeal). Two days later, on March 8, 2017, the government moved to dismiss the appeal as moot, which the Court granted the same day.

=== Further en banc proceedings ===
On March 15, 2017, the Ninth Circuit denied rehearing en banc. Judge Stephen Reinhardt added a concurrence, alone, where he wrote "I am proud to be a part of this court and a judicial system that is independent and courageous".

Judge Jay Bybee, joined by Judges Alex Kozinski, Consuelo María Callahan, Carlos Bea, and Sandra Segal Ikuta dissented from denial of reconsideration, writing that the court had committed "manifest error".

On March 17, Judge Kozinski, joined by the other dissenters, added another opinion dissenting from denial of reconsideration. Judge Bea added an additional opinion. Judge Marsha Berzon, however, alone, added a concurrence to the denial of reconsideration where she criticized the dissenters for the procedural irregularity of attempting to reconsider a case without a request by either party and after the appeal had been dismissed.

== Subsequent developments ==
=== New executive order ===
On March 17, 2017, Judge Robart refused to grant an additional restraining order after the President's new Executive Order 13780 was blocked by U.S. District Judge Derrick Watson in Honolulu, Hawaii.

=== The U.S. Supreme Court ===
In a per curiam decision, on June 26, 2017, the United States Supreme Court reinstated key provisions narrowed to apply only to foreign nationals who have no "credible claim of a bona fide relationship with a person or entity in the United States" and set case for final consideration in October. The court also granted certiorari and set oral arguments for the fall term. In an unsigned statement the Supreme Court stated that denying entry to foreign nationals abroad who have no connection to the United States "does not burden any American party by reason of that party's relationship with the foreign national."

== See also ==
- Legal challenges to Executive Order 13769
- Executive Order 13780
- Legal challenges to the Trump travel ban
