= Michael A. Lilly =

Michael A. Lilly, Sr.

6th Attorney General of Hawaii
- In office 1984–1985
- Governor: George Ariyoshi
- Preceded by: Tany S. Hong
- Succeeded by: Corinne Watanabe

Personal details
- Born: Honolulu, Hawaii, U.S.
- Education: McGeorge School of Law

Michael A. Lilly, Sr. is an American attorney who was Attorney General of Hawaii from 1984 to 1985.

== Biography ==
Michael A. Lilly was born in Honolulu, Hawaii. He graduated from the McGeorge School of Law of the University of the Pacific with honors in 1974 and was admitted to the California bar in 1974 and the Hawaii bar the next year. Lilly was a Hawaii Deputy Attorney General from 1975 to 1979 and practiced in San Jose, California from 1979 to 1981. In 1981 he was named First Deputy Attorney General in Hawaii. Lilly retired as a Captain in the United States Navy and served with the Navy in combat during the Vietnam War.

Lilly was appointed Hawaii Attorney General by Governor George Ariyoshi in June 1984. Lilly returned to private practice in 1985, and was succeeded by First Deputy Attorney General Corinne Watanabe. He was a partner in Ning, Lilly & Jones from 1985 to 2019 when he retired.

== Bibliography ==
- Lilly, Michael A. (2019). Nimitz at Ease. Stairway Press. ISBN 1949267261.
