= Ozell Miller Trask =

American judge (1909–1984)

Senior Judge of the United States Court of Appeals for the Ninth Circuit
- In office October 31, 1979 – May 5, 1984

Judge of the United States Court of Appeals for the Ninth Circuit
- In office September 16, 1969 – October 31, 1979
- Appointed by: Richard Nixon
- Preceded by: Seat established by 82 Stat. 184
- Succeeded by: William Canby

Personal details
- Born: Ozell Miller Trask; July 4, 1909 Wakita, Oklahoma
- Died: May 5, 1984 (aged 74)
- Education: Washburn University (AB); Harvard Law School (LLB)

Ozell Miller Trask (July 4, 1909 – May 5, 1984) was a United States circuit judge of the United States Court of Appeals for the Ninth Circuit.

== Education and career ==
Born in Wakita, Oklahoma, Trask received an Artium Baccalaureus degree from Washburn University in 1931 where he was a member of the Kansas Beta chapter of Phi Delta Theta and initiated into Sagamore, Washburn's most exclusive honor society. Trask was a finalist for the Rhodes Scholarship in 1929. He received a Bachelor of Laws from Harvard Law School in 1934. He entered private practice in Kansas City, Missouri in 1934, eventually moving his practice to Phoenix, Arizona, where he continued until 1969.

== Federal judicial service ==
On June 26, 1969, Trask was nominated by President Richard Nixon to a new seat on the United States Court of Appeals for the Ninth Circuit created by 82 Stat. 184. He was confirmed by the United States Senate on September 12, 1969, and received his commission on September 16, 1969. He assumed senior status on October 31, 1979, serving in that capacity until his death on May 5, 1984.

== Sources ==
Legal offices
Preceded by Seat established by 82 Stat. 184	Judge of the United States Court of Appeals for the Ninth Circuit; 1969–1979	Succeeded by William Canby
