= Robert C. Broomfield =

American judge (1933–2014)

Robert Broomfield
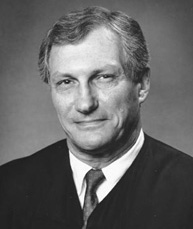

Judge of the United States Foreign Intelligence Surveillance Court
- In office October 1, 2002 – May 18, 2009
- Appointed by: William Rehnquist
- Preceded by: Royce Lamberth
- Succeeded by: Susan Webber Wright

Senior Judge of the United States District Court for the District of Arizona
- In office August 12, 1999 – July 10, 2014

Chief Judge of the United States District Court for the District of Arizona
- In office 1994 – August 12, 1999
- Preceded by: William Docker Browning
- Succeeded by: Stephen M. McNamee

Judge of the United States District Court for the District of Arizona
- In office July 11, 1985 – August 12, 1999
- Appointed by: Ronald Reagan
- Preceded by: Seat established by 71 Stat. 586
- Succeeded by: Susan R. Bolton

Personal details
- Born: Robert Cameron Broomfield; June 18, 1933 Detroit, Michigan, U.S.
- Died: July 10, 2014 (aged 81) Phoenix, Arizona, U.S.
- Education: Pennsylvania State University (BS); University of Arizona (LLB)

Robert Cameron Broomfield (June 18, 1933 – July 10, 2014) was a United States district judge of the United States District Court for the District of Arizona.

== Education and career ==
Broomfield was born on June 18, 1933, in Detroit. He earned a Bachelor of Science degree from Pennsylvania State University in 1955, and a Bachelor of Laws from James E. Rogers College of Law at the University of Arizona in 1961. From 1955 to 1958, Broomfield was a United States Air Force Lieutenant, and an Air Force Reserve Captain from 1961 to 1972. He served as a clerk and bailiff to Judge Jack D. H. Hays of the Superior Court of Arizona from 1961 to 1962. He was in private practice in Phoenix, Arizona from 1962 to 1970. He was a judge of the Superior Court of Arizona from 1971 to 1985, serving as presiding judge of the Juvenile Division from 1972 to 1974 and serving as presiding judge of the court from 1974 to 1985.

=== Federal judicial service ===
Broomfield was nominated by President Ronald Reagan on May 15, 1985, to the United States District Court for the District of Arizona, to a new seat authorized by 71 Stat. 586. He was confirmed by the United States Senate on July 10, 1985, and received commission on July 11, 1985. He served as Chief Judge from 1994 to 1999. He assumed senior status on August 12, 1999. His service terminated on July 10, 2014, due to death.

Chief Justice William Rehnquist appointed Broomfield to the Foreign Intelligence Surveillance Court in May 2002, a position in which he served until 2009. Rehnquist also appointed him to the Budget Committee in 1997, and he served as a member until 2013.

== Death ==
Broomfield died of cancer in a Phoenix hospice on July 10, 2014, one day shy of 29 years from the date he was commissioned as a federal judge.

== Accomplishment and honor ==
Broomfield was influential in obtaining approval for and funding of the Sandra Day O'Connor United States Courthouse in Phoenix.

His former colleagues held a memorial service in his honor at the District Court of Arizona on July 23, 2014.

Legal offices
Preceded by Seat established by 71 Stat. 586	Judge of the United States District Court for the District of Arizona; 1985–1999	Succeeded by Susan R. Bolton
Preceded by William Docker Browning	Chief Judge of the United States District Court for the District of Arizona; 1994–1999	Succeeded by Stephen M. McNamee
Preceded by Royce Lamberth	Judge of the United States Foreign Intelligence Surveillance Court; 2002–2009	Succeeded by Susan Webber Wright
