= Cynthia Holcomb Hall =

American judge (1929–2011)

Cynthia Hall

Senior Judge of the United States Court of Appeals for the Ninth Circuit
- In office August 31, 1997 – February 26, 2011

Judge of the United States Court of Appeals for the Ninth Circuit
- In office October 4, 1984 – August 31, 1997
- Appointed by: Ronald Reagan
- Preceded by: Seat established
- Succeeded by: Richard Clifton

Judge of the United States District Court for the Central District of California
- In office November 18, 1981 – October 4, 1984
- Appointed by: Ronald Reagan
- Preceded by: Harry Pregerson
- Succeeded by: John Davies

Personal details
- Born: February 19, 1929; Los Angeles, California, U.S.
- Died: February 26, 2011 (aged 82); Pasadena, California, U.S.
- Political party: Republican
- Education: Stanford University (BA, LLB); New York University (LLM)

Cynthia Holcomb Hall (February 19, 1929 – February 26, 2011) was a United States circuit judge of the United States Court of Appeals for the Ninth Circuit and a United States district judge of the United States District Court for the Central District of California.

== Early life and career ==
Born in Los Angeles, California, Hall received an Artium Baccalaureus degree from Stanford University in 1951, a Bachelor of Laws from Stanford Law School in 1954, and a Master of Laws in taxation from New York University School of Law in 1960. She was a United States Naval Reserve Lieutenant, JAG Corps from 1951 to 1953. She was a law clerk for Judge Richard Harvey Chambers of the United States Court of Appeals for the Ninth Circuit from 1954 to 1955. She was the first woman to serve as a law clerk on the Ninth Circuit. Hall was a research assistant to the editor of the Tax Law Review from 1959 to 1960. She was a trial attorney of the Tax Division of the United States Department of Justice in Washington, D.C., from 1960 to 1964, and an attorney advisor for the Office of Tax Legislative Counsel in the United States Department of the Treasury from 1964 to 1966. She was in private practice in Beverly Hills, California from 1966 to 1972.

== Judicial career ==
In 1972, Hall was appointed by President Richard Nixon to a seat on the United States Tax Court.

On October 14, 1981, President Ronald Reagan nominated Hall to a seat on the United States District Court for the Central District of California vacated by Judge Harry Pregerson. Hall was confirmed by the United States Senate on November 18, 1981, and received her commission the same day. Her service terminated on October 4, 1984, due to elevation to the court of appeals.

On August 1, 1984, Reagan nominated Hall to a new seat on the United States Court of Appeals for the Ninth Circuit created by 98 Stat. 333. She was confirmed by the Senate on October 3, 1984, and received her commission on October 4, 1984. She assumed senior status on August 31, 1997, serving in that status until her death.

== Death ==
Hall died of cancer at her home in Pasadena, California, on February 26, 2011, at the age of 82.

== Sources ==
Legal offices
| Preceded by Harry Pregerson | Judge of the United States District Court for the Central District of California; 1981–1984 | Succeeded by John Davies |
| New seat | Judge of the United States Court of Appeals for the Ninth Circuit; 1984–1997 | Succeeded by Richard Clifton |
