= Anne E. Lopez =

Attorney General of Hawaii since 2022

Anne Lopez
- Lopez in 2023

18th Attorney General of Hawaii
- Incumbent
- Assumed office December 5, 2022; Acting: December 5, 2022 – April 25, 2023
- Governor: Josh Green
- Preceded by: Holly Shikada

Personal details
- Born: 1962 or 1963 (age 63–64)
- Party: Democratic
- Education: San Jose State University (BS); University of Hawaii, Manoa (JD)

Anne Elizabeth Lopez (born 1962 or 1963) is an American attorney and politician. She has served as Attorney General of Hawaii since December 5, 2022. Prior to her appointment by Governor Josh Green, Lopez was chief operating officer and general counsel for the Hawaii Health Systems Corporation. She is a member of the Democratic Party.

In November 2026, Lopez announced that she would not be retained as attorney general, with her term ending on December 7, 2026.

== Education and career ==
Lopez graduated with her Bachelor of Science degree from San Jose State University and her Juris Doctor from the William S. Richardson School of Law at the University of Hawaiʻi at Mānoa. Before pursuing a legal career, Lopez worked as an occupational therapist.

Lopez worked in private practice with the law firm Chun Kerr Dodd Beaman & Wong for eight years. From 2013 to 2015, Lopez served as a special assistant to Attorney General of Hawaii David M. Louie. At the time of her appointment as attorney general, she worked at the Hawaii Health Systems Corporation as chief operating officer and general counsel.

== Attorney General of Hawaii ==
In December 2022, Lopez was nominated by Governor Josh Green to succeed Holly Shikada as attorney general of Hawaii. The Hawaii Senate confirmed Lopez's nomination on April 25, 2023.

As attorney general, Lopez has declined to re-file charges against 38 kupuna arrested during the 2019 Thirty Meter Telescope protests.

In the wake of the 2023 Hawaii wildfires, Lopez initiated an independent examination into authorities' response to the fires. She issued subpoenas to three Maui County agencies to push the investigation forward.

== Personal life ==
Lopez identifies as lesbian.

Legal offices
Preceded by Holly Shikada	Attorney General of Hawaii; 2022–present	Incumbent
