= Michelle Friedland =

American judge (born 1972)

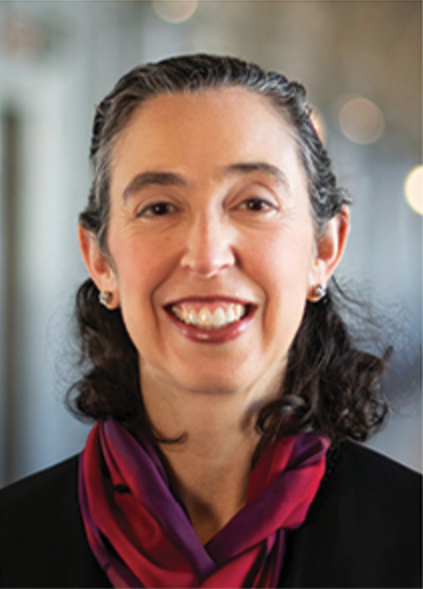
- Friedland in 2022

Judge of the United States Court of Appeals for the Ninth Circuit
- Incumbent
- Assumed office April 29, 2014
- Appointed by: Barack Obama
- Preceded by: Raymond C. Fisher

Personal details
- Born: 1972 (age 53–54) Berkeley, California, U.S.
- Spouse: Daniel Kelly (m. 2000)
- Education: Stanford University (BS, JD); Wolfson College, Oxford (attended)

Michelle Taryn Friedland (born in 1972) is a United States circuit judge of the United States Court of Appeals for the Ninth Circuit.

== Biography ==
=== Early life and education ===
Friedland was born in Berkeley, California. She graduated from The Pingry School in Basking Ridge, New Jersey. She received a Bachelor of Science degree in biology in 1995 from Stanford University, graduating Phi Beta Kappa. She then studied philosophy at Wolfson College, Oxford, as a Fulbright Scholar, returning to California for law school. She received a Juris Doctor in 2000 from Stanford Law School, graduating Order of the Coif and second in her class. She served as a law clerk to Judge David Tatel of the United States Court of Appeals for the District of Columbia Circuit and then served as a law clerk to Justice Sandra Day O'Connor of the United States Supreme Court. She completed a two-year lectureship at Stanford Law School before entering private practice. She has been married to Daniel Kelly since June 17, 2000.

=== Professional career ===
Before her confirmation, Friedland served as a litigation partner in the San Francisco office of Munger, Tolles & Olson LLP. She joined the firm in 2004 as an associate, becoming a partner in January 2010. She has extensive litigation experience at the state and federal trial court and appellate levels, including litigating before the United States Supreme Court.

During her legal career, Friedland represented a number of corporate clients in cases involving a wide range of legal issues, including antitrust, tax, patent, copyright, and consumer class actions. She also frequently represented the University of California in cases involving constitutional issues. She maintained an active pro bono practice. The State Bar of California named a Munger team including Friedland a recipient of the 2013 President's Pro Bono Service Award. Friedland also has served as an adjunct professor at the University of Virginia Law School, teaching a course on constitutional issues in higher education.

== Federal judicial service ==
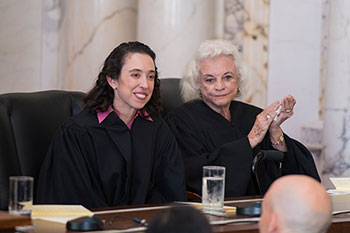
Friedland being applauded by Justice Sandra Day O'Connor (Ret.) after being administered the oath of office on June 13, 2014

On August 1, 2013, President Barack Obama nominated Friedland to a seat on the United States Court of Appeals for the Ninth Circuit. She filled the seat that was vacated by Judge Raymond C. Fisher, who assumed senior status on March 31, 2013. On January 16, 2014, the Senate Judiciary Committee reported her nomination out of committee by a 14–3 vote. On April 10, 2014, the United States Senate invoked cloture on her nomination by a 56–41 vote. On April 28, 2014, her nomination was confirmed by a 51–40 vote. She received her judicial commission on April 29, 2014. Justice Sandra Day O'Connor administered the oath of office to Friedland at her formal investiture on June 13, 2014, in the James R. Browning United States Court of Appeals Building in San Francisco. At the time of her appointment Friedland, then 41, ranked fourth among the youngest appointees to the Ninth Circuit Court of Appeals.

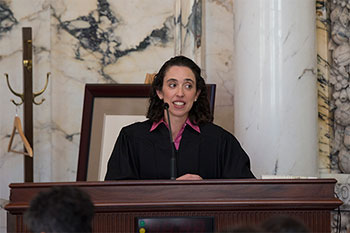
Friedland taking her seat as Circuit Judge for the Ninth Circuit

== Notable cases ==
On February 4, 2017, Friedland and Judge William Canby rejected the Trump administration's request for an administrative stay of the district court's temporary restraining order in State of Washington v. Trump, part of the ongoing court cases related to Executive Order 13769, pending full review in the Ninth Circuit. On February 7, Friedland, Canby, and Judge Richard Clifton heard oral arguments on the emergency motion to stay, with an audio feed of the telephonic argument broadcast nationwide. On February 9, the three judges denied the request for a stay of the temporary restraining order. The case was notably parodied by Saturday Night Live, with Judge Friedland being portrayed by Vanessa Bayer.

On July 3, 2019, in another high-profile ruling, Friedland and Richard R. Clifton upheld a district court's halting of parts of Donald Trump's wall. N. Randy Smith issued a dissent, and on July 26, the Supreme Court overturned Friedland and Clifton by a 5–3 vote, with Stephen Breyer saying he would temporarily block the construction of the wall but allow funding to be set aside for it.

On August 16, 2021, Friedland (joined by Ronald Gould & Jill Otake) upheld an EPA ruling that the Sacketts' property contained wetlands that were protected by the Clean Water Act. The 9th circuit was reversed by the Supreme Court in Sackett v. Environmental Protection Agency (2023), which held that only wetlands with a "continuous surface connection" to waters of the United States were protected by the Clean Water Act.

In Garcia v. City of Los Angeles, decided on September 2, 2021, Friedland ruled that the city of Los Angeles cannot seize and discard the "bulky items" of homeless individuals.

On January 2, 2024, Friedland wrote a dissent from denial of en banc in California Restaurant Association v. City of Berkeley, a case where the original panel overturned the City of Berkeley's ban on natural gas in new buildings. Friedland was joined by Chief Judge Murguia, Judges Wardlaw, Gould, Koh, Sung, Sanchez, & Mendoza. In Friedland's nearly 10 years on the bench, this is the first time she has written a dissent from denying en banc.

== Personal life ==
Friedland is married to Daniel Kelly.

== See also ==
- List of Jewish American jurists
- List of law clerks for the eighth seat of the Supreme Court of the United States
- Joe Biden Supreme Court candidates

Legal offices
Preceded by Raymond C. Fisher	Judge of the United States Court of Appeals for the Ninth Circuit; 2014–present	Incumbent
