= Russell Suzuki =

American Attorney General of Hawaii

15th Attorney General of Hawaii
- In office February 2, 2018 – January 3, 2019; Acting: February 2 – March 29, 2018
- Governor: David Ige
- Preceded by: Doug Chin
- Succeeded by: Clare E. Connors
- Acting; December 1, 2014 – March 12, 2015
- Governor: David Ige
- Preceded by: David M. Louie
- Succeeded by: Doug Chin

Personal details
- Party: Democratic
- Education: University of Hawaii, Manoa (BA); Ohio State University (JD)

Russell A. Suzuki is an American attorney and was the 15th Attorney General of Hawaii. He was nominated on March 14, 2018 by Governor David Ige, and was confirmed by the Hawaii Senate on March 29, 2018. He served until January 2019, when Governor Ige appointed Clare E. Connors as his successor.

== Education ==
Suzuki attended Leilehua High School. He subsequently obtained his undergraduate degree from the University of Hawaii and also obtained a J.D. from Ohio State University Moritz College of Law.

== Career ==
Suzuki was admitted to the Hawaii State bar in 1977. He initially practiced criminal defense law, family law, business law, and military law at the law offices of Yoshiro Nakamura. He subsequently moved to the public sector and was employed with the Department of the Attorney General as Supervising Deputy Attorney General of the Administration Division and Education Division. He then served as First Deputy Attorney General under Attorneys General Douglas Chin, David M. Louie, and Mark J. Bennett. He has also served as counsel to various state boards and commissions, including the Land Use Commission, the Board of Education, the Board of Regents, the Employees’ Retirement System, the Employer-Union Health Benefits Trust Fund, and the Judicial Selection Commission.

In 2014, Suzuki was appointed as acting Attorney General of Hawaii when newly elected Governor David Ige chose not to reappoint David Louie, the previous Attorney General. Suzuki served in an interim capacity until Douglas Chin was appointed Attorney General in 2015. After serving as First Deputy Attorney General under Chin for three years, Suzuki was again appointed acting Attorney General of Hawaii on February 2, 2018 when Chin stepped down in order to assume office as Lieutenant Governor of Hawaii.

On March 14, 2018 Governor David Ige appointed Suzuki Attorney General of Hawaii on an official basis. He served until the following year, when Ige nominated lawyer Clare E. Connors as the new Attorney General on January 3, 2019.

Legal offices
Preceded by David M. Louie	Attorney General of Hawaii; Acting; 2014–2015	Succeeded by Doug Chin
Preceded by Doug Chin	Attorney General of Hawaii; 2018–2019	Succeeded by Clare E. Connors
