= Margery Bronster =

American lawyer and politician

10th Attorney General of Hawaii
- In office 1995–1999
- Governor: Ben Cayetano
- Preceded by: Robert A. Marks
- Succeeded by: Earl I. Anzai

Personal details
- Born: December 12, 1957 (age 68) New York City, New York, U.S.
- Education: Brown University (BA); Columbia Law School (JD)

Margery S. Bronster (born December 12, 1957) is a lawyer who served as Attorney General of Hawaii from 1995 to 1999.

== Career ==
Bronster graduated from Brown University, where she became fluent in Mandarin Chinese, and then Columbia University Law School in 1982. She went into private practice for Shearman & Sterling in New York City in litigation. She moved to Honolulu, Hawaii in 1988, and joined the firm Carlsmith Ball Wichman Murray Case & Ichiki. That law firm is now known as Carlsmith Ball, LLP.

In 1995, she was appointed as the first woman to hold the office of Attorney General of Hawaii for a full term.

During her tenure in the Democratic administration of Governor of Hawaii Benjamin J. Cayetano, she won the state a multibillion-dollar Master Settlement Agreement from tobacco companies. In 1997, she led an investigation into abuses by the Kamehameha Schools/Bishop Estate trustees. She was reappointed to a second term by Cayetano, but her investigation of Bishop Estate trustees caused her to fall out of favor with the Hawaii State Legislature, resulting in her failed confirmation to a second term by the state senate in 1999. She was replaced as Attorney General by Earl I. Anzai, who was formerly budget director.

Bronster then became a founding partner in the Honolulu-based Bronster Crabtree & Hoshibata, now Bronster Fujichaku Robbins. Best Lawyers in America recognized her as 2016 "Lawyer of the Year" in Honolulu, in the practice area of Insurance Litigation.

== See also ==
- List of female state attorneys general in the United States

Legal offices
Preceded by Robert A. Marks	Attorney General of Hawaii; 1995–1998	Succeeded by Earl I. Anzai
