= Dominic W. Lanza =

American judge (born 1976)

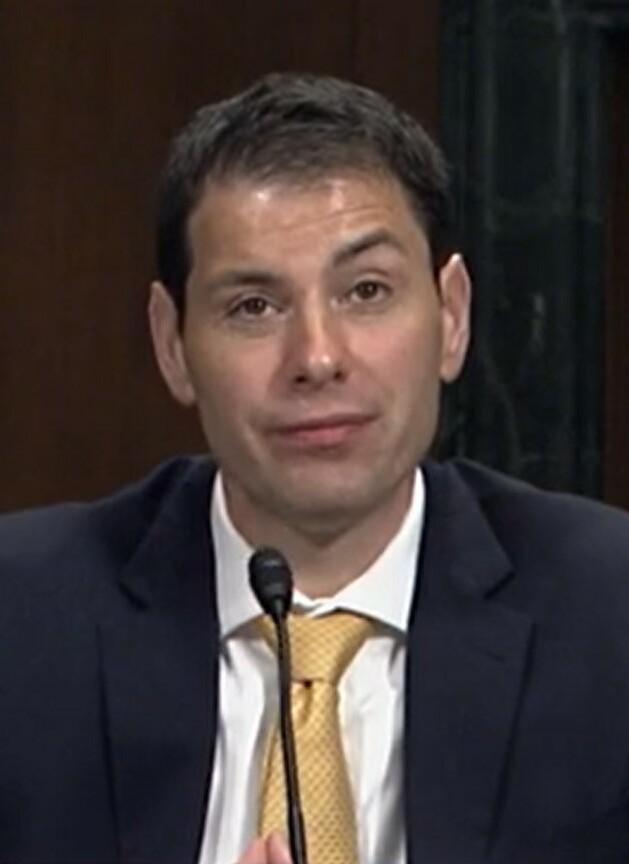

Judge of the United States District Court for the District of Arizona
- Incumbent
- Assumed office September 10, 2018
- Appointed by: Donald Trump
- Preceded by: Susan R. Bolton

Personal details
- Born: Dominic William Lanza; May 20, 1976 (age 49) Seattle, Washington, U.S.
- Party: Republican
- Education: Dartmouth College (AB); Harvard University (JD)

Dominic William Lanza (born May 20, 1976) is a United States district judge of the United States District Court for the District of Arizona. He was formerly an Assistant United States Attorney for the District of Arizona.

== Education and early career ==
Lanza earned his Artium Baccalaureus, summa cum laude, from Dartmouth College and his Juris Doctor, cum laude, from Harvard Law School, where he served as editor and transition chair of the Harvard Law Review. While in college, he was an All-Ivy League, All-America, and Academic All-America football player and was named the outstanding member of his graduating class.

After graduating from law school, he served as a law clerk to Judge Pamela Ann Rymer of the United States Court of Appeals for the Ninth Circuit. He then practiced for five years as an associate in the constitutional and appellate law practice group of Gibson, Dunn & Crutcher. Before becoming a judge, Lanza served as Chief and Executive Assistant United States Attorney for the District of Arizona.

=== Federal judicial service ===
On January 23, 2018, President Donald Trump announced his intent to nominate Lanza to become a United States district judge of the United States District Court for the District of Arizona. On January 24, 2018, his nomination was sent to the United States Senate. He was nominated to the seat vacated by Judge Susan R. Bolton, who assumed senior status on September 1, 2016. On March 7, 2018, a hearing on his nomination was held before the Senate Judiciary Committee. On April 19, 2018, his nomination was reported out of committee by a 16–5 vote. On September 6, 2018, his nomination was confirmed by a 60–35 vote. He received his judicial commission on September 10, 2018.

== Memberships ==
He has been a member of the Federalist Society since 2015.

Legal offices
Preceded by Susan R. Bolton	Judge of the United States District Court for the District of Arizona; 2018–present	Incumbent
