= Richard Clifton =

American judge (born 1950)

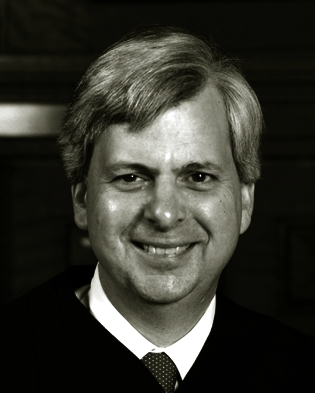

Senior Judge of the United States Court of Appeals for the Ninth Circuit
- Incumbent
- Assumed office December 31, 2016

Judge of the United States Court of Appeals for the Ninth Circuit
- In office July 30, 2002 – December 31, 2016
- Appointed by: George W. Bush
- Preceded by: Cynthia Holcomb Hall
- Succeeded by: Mark J. Bennett

Personal details
- Born: Richard Randall Clifton; November 13, 1950 (age 74); Framingham, Massachusetts, U.S.
- Education: Princeton University (AB); Yale University (JD)

Richard Randall Clifton (born November 13, 1950) is a senior United States circuit judge of the United States Court of Appeals for the Ninth Circuit.

== Education and legal training ==
Clifton received an Artium Baccalaureus degree at Princeton University and a Juris Doctor from Yale Law School. After law school, he clerked for Ninth Circuit Judge Herbert Choy.

== Career ==
Following his clerkship, he was in private practice in Honolulu, Hawaii until his appointment to the federal bench. He also taught for several years at the William S. Richardson School of Law at the University of Hawaii as an adjunct professor.

=== Federal judicial service ===
He was nominated to the United States Court of Appeals for the Ninth Circuit by George W. Bush on September 4, 2001 to fill a seat vacated by Cynthia Holcomb Hall. The United States Senate confirmed him on July 30, 2002 by a 98–0 vote. He was Bush's first appointment to the Ninth Circuit. He received his commission on July 30, 2002. He assumed senior status on December 31, 2016.

=== Notable cases ===
In 2006, he was one of the judges on the panel that upheld the imprisonment of journalist Josh Wolf.

On February 7, 2017, Clifton along with fellow Ninth Circuit judges William Canby and Michelle Friedland heard oral arguments on a motion from the Trump administration to stay the temporary restraining order in State of Washington v. Trump, part of the ongoing court cases related to Executive Order 13769. A live audio feed of the telephonic argument was broadcast nationwide. On February 9, the three judges denied the request for a stay of the temporary restraining order.

In July 2018, Clifton dissented when the court found that Hawaii's licensing requirement to openly carry firearms violated the Second Amendment to the United States Constitution.

On July 3, 2019, in a follow-up ruling to the February 2017 ruling, Clifton and Michelle T. Friedland upheld a district court's halting of parts of Donald Trump's wall. N. Randy Smith issued a dissent, and on July 26, the Supreme Court overturned Friedland and Clifton by a 5-3 vote on ideological lines with Stephen Breyer saying he would temporarily block the construction of the wall but allow funding to be set aside for it.

On November 29, 2019, Clifton temporarily halted the execution of Barry Lee Jones, who was convicted of one count of sexual assault, 3 counts of child abuse, and a felony murder.

Legal offices
Preceded by Cynthia Holcomb Hall	Judge of the United States Court of Appeals for the Ninth Circuit; 2002–2016	Succeeded by Mark J. Bennett
