= Susan R. Bolton =

American judge (born 1951)

Susan Ritchie Bolton
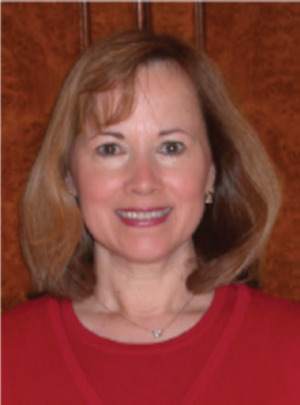

Senior Judge of the United States District Court for the District of Arizona
- Incumbent
- Assumed office September 1, 2016

Judge of the United States District Court for the District of Arizona
- In office October 13, 2000 – September 1, 2016
- Appointed by: Bill Clinton
- Preceded by: Robert C. Broomfield
- Succeeded by: Dominic W. Lanza

Personal details
- Born: Susan Marie Ritchie; September 1, 1951 (age 74) Philadelphia, Pennsylvania, U.S.
- Education: University of Iowa (BA, JD)

Susan Marie Ritchie Bolton (born September 1, 1951) is a senior United States district judge of the United States District Court for the District of Arizona.

== Early life, education, and early career ==
Born in Philadelphia, Pennsylvania, Bolton received a Bachelor of Arts degree from the University of Iowa in 1973 and a Juris Doctor from the University of Iowa College of Law in 1975. She was a law clerk for Judge Laurance T. Wren of the Arizona Court of Appeals from 1975 to 1977. She was then in private practice in Phoenix, Arizona from 1977 to 1989. Bolton served on the Arizona Superior Court for Maricopa County, from 1989 to 2000.

== Federal judicial service ==
On July 21, 2000, based upon the recommendation of United States Senator Jon Kyl from Arizona, Bolton was nominated by President Bill Clinton to a seat on the United States District Court for the District of Arizona vacated by Robert C. Broomfield. She was confirmed by the United States Senate on October 3, 2000. She received her commission on October 13, 2000. She is a registered Independent. Bolton assumed senior status on September 1, 2016.

=== 2010 Arizona immigration law cases ===
In July 2010, Bolton heard arguments on three of seven lawsuits related to the Arizona SB 1070 immigration law, including United States v. Arizona.

On Wednesday, July 28, 2010, Bolton issued a ruling blocking small portions of SB 1070, writing that "requiring police to check the immigration status of those they arrest or whom they stop and suspect are in the country illegally would overwhelm the federal government's ability to respond, and could mean legal immigrants are wrongly arrested." Judge Bolton wrote: "Federal resources will be taxed and diverted from federal enforcement priorities as a result of the increase in requests for immigration status determination that will flow from Arizona."

On September 5, 2012, Judge Bolton cleared the way for police to carry out the 2010 law's requirement that officers, while enforcing other laws, may question the immigration status of those they suspect are in the country illegally. This part of the law has been called the "show me your papers" provision.

On July 31, 2017, Judge Bolton filed her "Findings of Fact and Conclusions of Law" holding former Maricopa County sheriff Joe Arpaio in criminal contempt of court for violating an injunction. President Trump pardoned Arpaio on August 25, 2017, though Judge Bolton declined to erase the conviction, ruling that the pardon spared Arpaio from sentencing but did not change the facts or the record of the case. This ruling was upheld on appeal.

Legal offices
Preceded by Robert C. Broomfield	Judge on the United States District Court for the District of Arizona; 2000–2016	Succeeded by Dominic W. Lanza
