= Corinne Watanabe =

American judge (born 1950)

7th Attorney General of Hawaii
- In office 1985–1986
- Governor: George Ariyoshi
- Preceded by: Michael A. Lilly
- Succeeded by: Warren Price III

Personal details
- Born: Corinne Kaoru Amemiya; August 1, 1950 (age 76) Wahiawa, Hawaii, U.S.
- Party: Democratic
- Spouse: Edwin Watanabe (Deceased)
- Education: University of Hawaiʻi at Mānoa Baylor University

Corinne Kaoru Amemiya Watanabe (born August 1, 1950) is an American judge from the state of Hawaii. Watanabe was the first female Attorney General of Hawaii from 1985 until 1986.

== Early life and education ==
Watanabe was born in Wahiawa, Hawaii, on the island of Oahu. Her parents were Keiji and Setsuko (Matsumiya) Amemiya. Watanabe attended Leilehua High School in Wahiawa.

Watanabe received her bachelor's degree from the University of Hawaiʻi at Mānoa in 1971. Watanabe attended Baylor University and received a Juris Doctor (J.D.) degree in 1974.

== Career ==
Watanabe served as deputy attorney general of Hawaii from 1974 to 1984, then as Attorney General of Hawaii between 1985 and 1986. One case she ruled on was Cobb v. State by Watanabe, which tested the resign-to-run laws. The question was whether State Senator Steve Cobb had to resign his seat in order to run for the United States House of Representatives. The ruling was that Article II, Section 7 of the Hawaii Constitution did not apply for federal office.

Cobb ran in the 1986 Special election in Hawaii's 1st congressional district to replace Cecil Heftel, who resigned to run for governor. Cobb came in fourth place, losing to Neil Abercrombie. Watanabe was a judge on the Hawaii Intermediate Court of Appeals since May 11, 1992. She is now retired.

== See also ==
- List of female state attorneys general in the United States
- List of Asian American jurists
