= Holly Shikada =

American attorney

17th Attorney General of Hawaii
- In office December 10, 2021 – December 5, 2022; Acting: December 10, 2021 – April 19, 2022
- Governor: David Ige; Josh Green
- Preceded by: Clare E. Connors
- Succeeded by: Anne E. Lopez

Personal details
- Born: c. 1960 (age 64–65)
- Political party: Democratic
- Education: University of Hawaii, Manoa (BA, JD)

Holly T. Shikada (born c. 1960) is an American politician and attorney who served as Attorney General of Hawaii from 2021 to 2022. She was appointed on December 10, 2021 by Governor David Ige following the resignation of Clare Connors. The Hawaii Senate confirmed her nomination on April 19, 2022. She was succeeded by Anne E. Lopez on December 5, 2022.

== Education ==
Shikada attended the University of Hawaiʻi at Mānoa, where she earned a Bachelor of Arts in accounting, and earned a Juris Doctor from the William S. Richardson School of Law.

== Career ==
Shikada was admitted to the Hawaii bar in October 1985. She started her career with the law firm Fujiyama Duffy & Fujiyama before serving over 30 years as a deputy Attorney General. Shikada was responsible for leading a unit to enforce the Felix Consent Decree. Shikada then served 18 years as the supervising deputy Attorney General for the Education Division before being appointed First Deputy Attorney General in March 2021.

In 2021, Clare Connors resigned as Attorney General to accept an appointment as the United States Attorney for the District of Hawaii. Governor David Ige, appointed Shikada to succeed Connors on December 10, 2021.

Legal offices
Preceded by Clare Connors	Attorney General of Hawaii; Acting: 2021–2022; 2021–2022	Succeeded by Anne E. Lopez
