= Barry G. Silverman =

American judge (born 1951)

Barry Silverman

Senior Judge of the United States Court of Appeals for the Ninth Circuit
- Incumbent
- Assumed office October 11, 2016

Judge of the United States Court of Appeals for the Ninth Circuit
- In office February 4, 1998 – October 11, 2016
- Appointed by: Bill Clinton
- Preceded by: William Canby
- Succeeded by: Bridget S. Bade

Personal details
- Born: Barry Glen Silverman; October 11, 1951 (age 75) New York City, New York, U.S.
- Party: Democratic
- Education: Arizona State University, Tempe (BA, JD)

Barry Glen Silverman (born October 11, 1951) is a senior United States circuit judge of the United States Court of Appeals for the Ninth Circuit.

== Education and early career ==
Born in The Bronx, New York, Silverman attended Phoenix's Central High School in the late 1960s. Silverman is Jewish. Silverman earned his Bachelor of Arts degree from Arizona State University in 1973 and his Juris Doctor from the Sandra Day O'Connor College of Law at Arizona State University in 1976. Silverman served as assistant city prosecutor for the city of Phoenix from 1976 until 1977 and was the deputy county attorney from 1977 until 1979, being assigned to the courtroom of future United States Supreme Court Justice Sandra Day O'Connor, who at that time was an Arizona jurist. Silverman was a Maricopa County superior court commissioner from 1979 until 1984. Then Arizona Governor Bruce Babbitt appointed Silverman a state superior court judge in 1984. In 1995, Silverman was appointed a United States magistrate judge in Phoenix.

== Federal judicial service ==
Silverman was nominated by President Bill Clinton on November 8, 1997, to a seat on the United States Court of Appeals for the Ninth Circuit vacated by Judge William Canby. Silverman's nomination enjoyed bipartisan support, with backing from Republican Senator Jon Kyl, a key member of the Senate Judiciary Committee. Silverman's nomination was sent by the Senate Judiciary Committee to the floor of the Senate on November 13, 1997. The Senate confirmed Silverman by a voice vote on January 28, 1998. He received his commission on February 4, 1998. After Silverman's confirmation, he told the Jewish News of Greater Phoenix in an article that appeared on February 6, 1998, that he was "really grateful" to President Clinton, Senator John McCain, Senator Jon Kyl and Representative Ed Pastor for their help and support in securing his confirmation. "I am going to try to live up to their confidence," he told the paper. In an article in the East Valley Tribune that ran on August 31, 2007, Silverman explained the support for him by two Republican senators by noting that he must have been a "registered Democrat that Republicans would be able to stomach. It just sort of fell in my lap, really." He assumed senior status on October 11, 2016, on his sixty-fifth birthday.

== Significant rulings ==
Since joining the Ninth Circuit, Silverman probably has become most known for writing the dissenting opinion for the 2-1 ruling in May 2002 that overturned a Sacramento federal district court's decision barring male prisoners the constitutional right to procreate and mail their sperm from jail. As the lone dissenting member of that earlier three-judge panel, Silverman famously wrote in September 2001 that the ruling would permit prisoners "to procreate from prison via FedEx," according to a September 6, 2001, article in the Los Angeles Times.

Additionally, Silverman wrote the opinion for the 3-judge panel in Tides v. The Boeing Company, pertaining to the "whistleblower provision of the Sarbanes–Oxley Act, 18 U.S.C. § 1514A(a)(1)" ruling against the employees, that employee leaks to the media are not protected under the provisions of the law.

== See also ==
- List of Jewish American jurists

Legal offices
Preceded by William Canby	Judge of the United States Court of Appeals for the Ninth Circuit; 1998–2016	Succeeded by Bridget S. Bade
