= Bridget S. Bade =

American judge (born 1965)

Bridget Bade
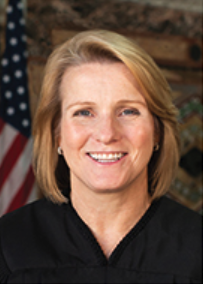

Judge of the United States Court of Appeals for the Ninth Circuit
- Incumbent
- Assumed office April 1, 2019
- Appointed by: Donald Trump
- Preceded by: Barry G. Silverman

Personal details
- Born: Bridget Anne Shelton; 1965 (age 60–61) Phoenix, Arizona, U.S.
- Education: Arizona State University, Tempe (BA, JD)

Bridget Anne Shelton Bade (née Shelton; born 1965) is an American lawyer and jurist from Arizona. She is a United States circuit judge of the United States Court of Appeals for the Ninth Circuit. She was formerly a United States magistrate judge of the United States District Court for the District of Arizona.

== Early life and career ==
Bade earned her Bachelor of Arts, summa cum laude, from the Arizona State University in 1987, and her Juris Doctor, cum laude, from its Sandra Day O'Connor College of Law in 1989. She served as an articles editor of the Arizona State Law Journal.

After graduating from law school, Bade clerked for Judge Edith Jones of the United States Court of Appeals for the Fifth Circuit from 1990 to 1991. Bade served for four years as a trial attorney in the Environmental Torts Section of the United States Department of Justice Civil Division from 1991 to 1995. She was later a shareholder at Beshears Wallwork Bellamy in Phoenix, Arizona, where her practice focused on civil litigation. Bade then spent a year as special counsel in the Phoenix, Arizona office of Steptoe & Johnson. Following her years in private practice, Bade was an Assistant United States Attorney for the District of Arizona for six years from 2006 to 2012.

== Federal judicial service ==
=== Magistrate judge tenure ===
Bade served as a United States magistrate judge of the United States District Court for the District of Arizona, a position she was appointed to in 2012, and left in 2019 when she became a circuit judge.

=== Court of appeals service ===
On August 27, 2018, President Donald Trump nominated Bade to serve as a United States circuit judge of the United States Court of Appeals for the Ninth Circuit. She was nominated to the seat vacated by Barry G. Silverman, who assumed senior status on October 11, 2016. On October 24, 2018, a hearing on her nomination was held before the Senate Judiciary Committee.

On January 3, 2019, her nomination was returned to the president under Rule XXXI, Paragraph 6 of the United States Senate. On January 23, 2019, President Trump announced his intent to renominate Bade for a federal judgeship. Her nomination was sent to the Senate later that day. On February 7, 2019, her nomination was reported out of committee by a 17–5 vote. On March 25, 2019, the Senate invoked cloture on her nomination by a 77–20 vote. On March 26, 2019, her nomination was confirmed by a 78–21 vote. She received her judicial commission on April 1, 2019.

In September 2020, President Trump included Bade on his list of potential nominees to the United States Supreme Court.

=== Notable rulings ===
On March 30, 2021, Bade and Milan Smith held in a 2-1 ruling that California Governor Gavin Newsom's restrictions on private gatherings, which limited indoor and outdoor gatherings to three households at a time, were constitutional. A Bible study group had sued Newsom on account of religious discrimination, but the majority held that religious gatherings were not being treated any differently than non-religious gatherings.

== See also ==
- Donald Trump Supreme Court candidates

Legal offices
Preceded by Barry G. Silverman	Judge of the United States Court of Appeals for the Ninth Circuit; 2019–present	Incumbent
