= Hawaii Attorney General =

Chief legal officer of Hawaii, US

Attorney General of Hawaii
- Loio Kuhina
- Incumbent; Anne E. Lopez since December 5, 2022
- Department of the Attorney General
- Type: Chief legal officer and chief law enforcement officer
- Appointer: Governor of Hawaii
- Formation: February 27, 1844
- First holder: John Ricord
- Succession: Fourth
- Salary: $183,804

The attorney general of Hawaii (Hawaiian: Loio Kuhina) is the chief legal officer and chief law enforcement officer of Hawaii. In present-day statehood within the United States, the attorney general is appointed by the elected governor with the approval of the state senate and is responsible for a state department charged with advising the various other departments and agencies of state government. The attorney general is responsible for the prosecution of offenses under state law. The attorney general can only be removed by an act of the state senate. In rare occasions, the attorney general serves as acting governor in the absence of both the governor and lieutenant governor from the state for an extended period of time.

The office has existed in several forms throughout the history of the Hawaiian Islands. It was created by Kamehameha III and was part of the administration of each successive monarch of the Kingdom of Hawaii. The office was kept in the provisional government, after Liliuokalani and the monarchy was overthrown, and became a part of the succeeding administration of the Republic of Hawaii. A regular part of the American model of the executive branch of government, the office of attorney general was part of the Territory of Hawaii under Section 80 of the Hawaiian Organic Act and made an appointed office after statehood was achieved in 1959.

Though a non-partisan office, in territorial days the office of attorney general was traditionally appointed from the political party of the sitting president of the United States who appointed the territorial governor. Similarly in statehood, the office of attorney general has traditionally been appointed from the incumbent governor's political party, thus far Republican or Democratic.

The current attorney general is Anne E. Lopez, who was appointed by Governor Josh Green. The Hawaii Senate confirmed Lopez's nomination on December 5, 2022.

== Agencies ==
The attorney general leads a department of 180 attorneys and 500 professional and support personnel. The department oversees various public services. These include administering the Hawaii Criminal Justice Data Center, running the Missing Child Center, Child Support Enforcement Agency, Hawaii Internet Crimes Against Children Task Force, Hawaii Internet and Technology Crimes Unit, Office of Child Support Hearings, Tobacco Enforcement Unit, among others. In accordance with Chapter 846E of the Hawaii Revised Statutes, the Criminal Justice Data Center maintains a registry of sex offenders in the state. Likewise, the agency provides other criminal history information through the statewide criminal history record information system and Automated Fingerprint Identification System.

== History ==
=== Origins ===
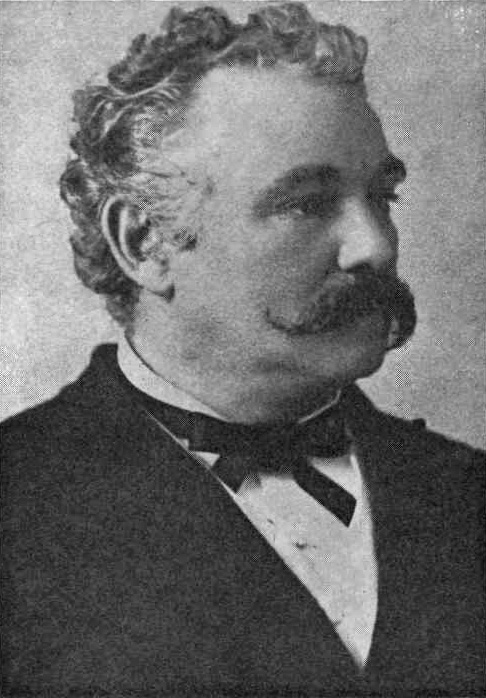
Paul Neumann, attorney general under Queen Liliuokalani, argued in Washington, D.C. against her overthrow, then defended her on treason-related charges, losing the case.

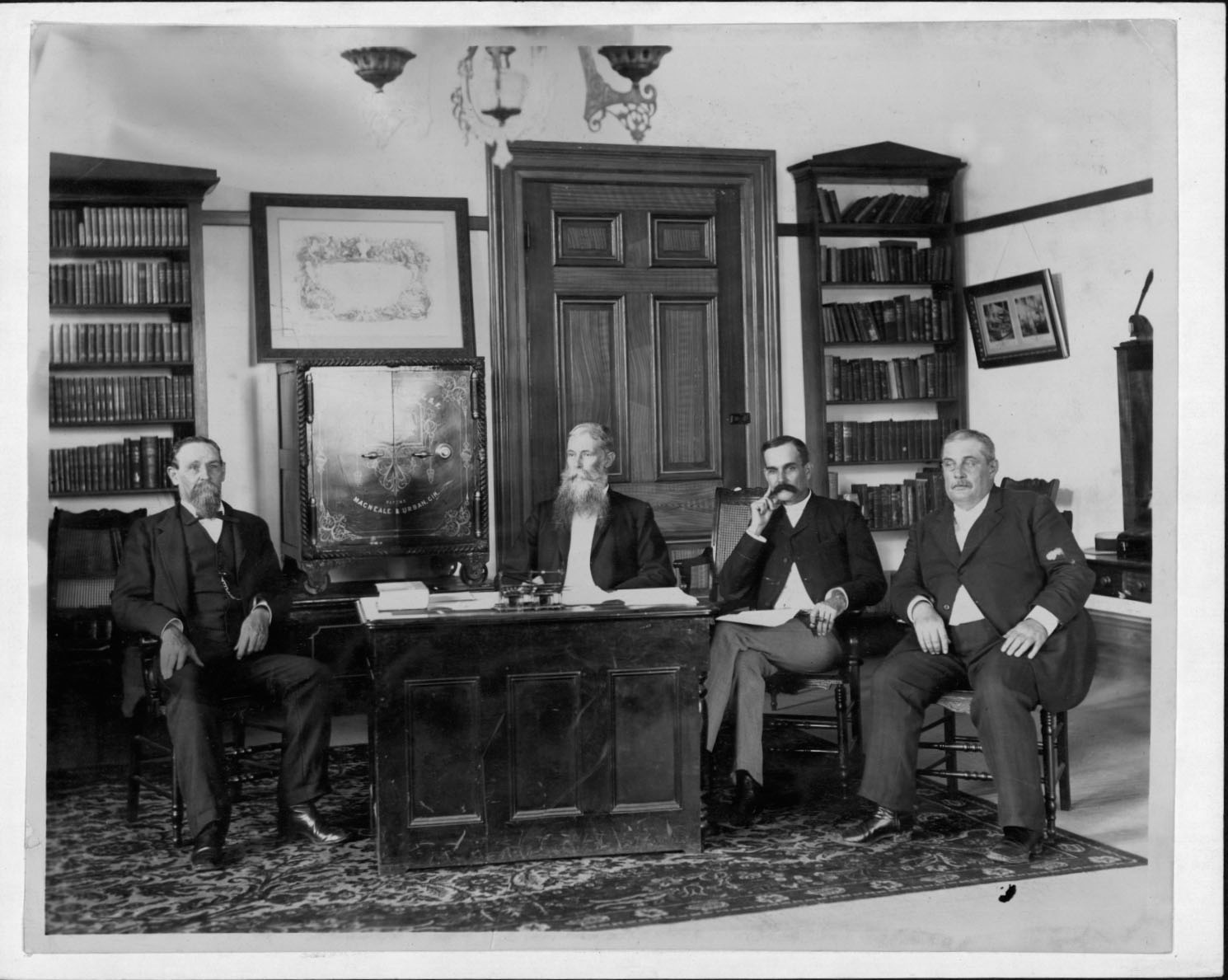
William Owen Smith (third from left) was attorney general of the provisional government and succeeding Republic of Hawaii. From left to right: Interior Minister James A. King, President Sanford B. Dole, Smith, Finance Minister Peter Cushman Jones.

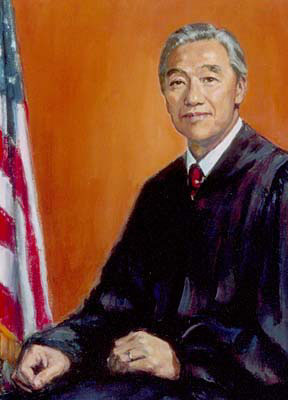
Herbert Young Cho Choy served as a territorial attorney general. He was the first Korean American to be admitted to the bar and the first Asian American to serve as federal judge. During his tenure on the U.S. Court of Appeals, Ninth Circuit, there were no other Asians sitting on any federal bench.

John Ricord served as the first attorney general of Hawaii. He arrived in the Kingdom on February 27, 1844, on the Columbia. He was the first Western-trained lawyer in the islands. The previous year a land dispute by Richard Charlton led to a British occupation known as the Paulet Affair. A related case of Ladd & Co. required lengthy arbitration. These cases would consume his entire time on the islands. Within a few weeks he swore allegiance to Kamehameha III and on March 9, 1844, was appointed first attorney general. In July 1845 he joined the Privy Council. On October 29, 1845, the executive branch of the government was formally organized through legislation he proposed. On May 17, 1847, he resigned all his offices, and on June 12 was released from his oath of allegiance, so he could resume his citizenship of the United States. He left August 19, 1847. The office of attorney general was suspended until the 1860s. His work on organizing the courts was taken over by the second trained attorney to arrive in the islands, William Little Lee.

=== Revival ===
On August 26, 1862, Kamehameha IV revived the office and appointed Charles Coffin Harris as attorney general. Having an attorney general proved useful on constitutional matters. Kamehameha V insisted on a new constitution that would restore some of the power to the monarchy that had been lost over time. Harris issued his legal opinion that the king had such a right and produced an early draft. A constitutional convention failed to reach agreement, so Harris got the cabinet to negotiate directly with Kamehameha V leading to the promulgation of the 1864 Constitution.

=== Controversies ===
A more modern controversy happened with the failed 1998 confirmation by the state senate of popular sitting attorney general Margery Bronster, as political payback for her actions to reform the corrupt Kamehameha Schools/Bishop Estate whose trustees were friends of various powerful legislators, many Hawaiʻi residents called for the right to elect the attorney general. Several attempts failed to create the constitutional amendment.

In 2026, the US government decertified and defunded Hawai‘i’s Medicaid Fraud Control Unit (part of the AG's responsibility) as one of the lowest-performing fraud units in the country. Demands to improve their performance began in 2014, in the Obama Administration. From 2021 to 2025, Hawai‘i’s Medicaid funding increased by 27%, as Medicaid enrollment went up 40%. MFCU did not obtain a single fraud indictment from 2021 to 2025.

== List of attorneys general ==
The attorneys general with dates of service:

=== Kingdom of Hawaii ===
Name	Portrait	Term start	Term end	Monarch(s) served under
John Ricord		March 9, 1844	May 17, 1847	Kamehameha III
Charles Coffin Harris		August 26, 1862	December 21, 1865	Kamehameha IV
Charles Coffin Harris (Acting)		March 26, 1866	September 12, 1866	Kamehameha V
Stephen Henry Phillips		September 12, 1866	January 10, 1873	Kamehameha V
Albert Francis Judd		January 13, 1873	February 19, 1874	Lunalilo
Alfred S. Hartwell		February 18, 1874	May 28, 1874	Kalākaua
Richard H. Stanley		May 28, 1874	November 5, 1875	Kalākaua
John Smith Walker (ad interim)		November 5, 1875	February 15, 1876	Kalākaua
William Richards Castle		February 15, 1876	December 5, 1876	Kalākaua
Alfred S. Hartwell		December 5, 1876	July 3, 1878	Kalākaua
Edward Preston		July 13, 1878	August 14, 1880	Kalākaua
W. Claude Jones		August 14, 1880	September 27, 1880	Kalākaua
John Smith Walker (ad interim)		September 27, 1880	November 29, 1880	Kalākaua
William Nevins Armstrong		November 29, 1880	January 17, 1881	Kalākaua
Henry A. P. Carter (Acting)		January 17, 1881	November 5, 1881	Kalākaua
William Nevins Armstrong		November 5, 1881	May 19, 1882	Kalākaua
Edward Preston		May 19, 1882	May 14, 1883	Kalākaua
Walter M. Gibson (Acting)		May 14, 1883	December 14, 1883	Kalākaua
Paul Neumann		December 14, 1883	June 30, 1886	Kalākaua
Walter M. Gibson (Acting)		September 18, 1884; August 3, 1885	September 18, 1884; August 3, 1885	Kalākaua
John T. Dare		July 1, 1886	October 13, 1886	Kalākaua
John Lot Kaulukou		October 13, 1886	October 23, 1886	Kalākaua
Luther Aholo (ad interim)		October 23, 1886	November 14, 1886	Kalākaua
Antone Rosa		November 15, 1886	June 28, 1887	Kalākaua
Clarence W. Ashford		July 1, 1887	June 14, 1890	Kalākaua
Lorrin A. Thurston (Acting)		November 22, 1889	November 22, 1889	Kalākaua
Arthur P. Peterson		June 17, 1890	February 25, 1891	Kalākaua
William A. Whiting		February 25, 1891	July 27, 1892	Liliʻuokalani
Hermann A. Widemann (ad interim)		July 27, 1892	August 29, 1892	Liliʻuokalani
Paul Neumann		August 29, 1892	August 30, 1892	Liliʻuokalani
Paul Neumann		September 12, 1892	October 17, 1892	Liliʻuokalani
Charles F. Creighton		November 1, 1892	November 8, 1892	Liliʻuokalani
Cecil Brown		November 8, 1892	January 12, 1893	Liliʻuokalani
Arthur P. Peterson		January 13, 1893	January 17, 1893	Liliʻuokalani

=== Republic of Hawaii ===
Name	Portrait	Term start	Term end
William Owen Smith		January 17, 1893	October 25, 1895
Francis March Hatch (ad interim)		October 25, 1895	November 6, 1895
Henry E. Cooper (ad interim)		November 6, 1895	December 13, 1895
William Owen Smith		December 13, 1895	February 10, 1897
Henry E. Cooper (ad interim)		February 10, 1897	April 16, 1897
William Owen Smith		April 16, 1897	March 20, 1899

=== Territory of Hawaii ===
Name	Portrait	Term start	Term end	Territorial governor(s) served under
Henry Ernest Cooper		March 20, 1899	June 14, 1900	-
Edmund Pearson Dole		June 14, 1900	February 1, 1903	Sanford B. Dole
Lorrin Andrews (grandson of missionary Lorrin Andrews)		February 1, 1903	November 21, 1905	George R. Carter
Emil C. Peters		November 21, 1905	August 15, 1907	George R. Carter
Charles R. Hemenway		August 15, 1907	January 30, 1910	Walter F. Frear
Alexander Lindsay Jr.		January 30, 1910	December 31, 1912	Walter F. Frear
Wade Warren Thayer		January 1, 1913	April 16, 1914	Walter F. Frear Lucius E. Pinkham
Ingram M. Stainback		April 17, 1914	April 18, 1918	Lucius E. Pinkham
Arthur G. Smith		April 18, 1918	August 30, 1918	Lucius E. Pinkham Charles J. McCarthy
Harry Irwin		August 30, 1918	August 31, 1922	Charles J. McCarthy Wallace Rider Farrington
John A. Matthewman		September 1, 1922	March 26, 1925	Wallace Rider Farrington
William B. Lymer		March 27, 1925	June 20, 1928	Wallace Rider Farrington
Harry P. Hewitt		June 21, 1928	April 30, 1934	Wallace Rider Farrington Lawrence M. Judd
William B. Pittman		May 1, 1934	December 20, 1936	Lawrence M. Judd Joseph Poindexter
Joseph V. Hodgson Acting		February 15, 1935	February 15, 1935	Joseph Poindexter
S. B. Kemp		January 2, 1937	June 30, 1938	Joseph Poindexter
Joseph V. Hodgson		July 1, 1938	June 7, 1942	Joseph Poindexter
Ernest K. Kai		June 8, 1942	October 4, 1942	Joseph Poindexter Ingram Stainback
J. Garner Anthony		October 4, 1942	December 31, 1943	Ingram Stainback
Cyrus Nils Tavares		January 1, 1944	June 30, 1947	Ingram Stainback
Rhoda Valentine Lewis Acting		July 1, 1947	October 13, 1947	Ingram Stainback
Walter D. Ackerman Jr.		October 14, 1947	February 29, 1952	Ingram Stainback Oren E. Long
Michiro Watanabe		March 1, 1952	March 2, 1953	Oren E. Long Samuel Wilder King
Edward N. Sylva		March 3, 1953	November 14, 1956	Samuel Wilder King
Richard K. Sharpless		November 15, 1956	May 7, 1957	Samuel Wilder King
Shiro Kashiwa		May 8, 1957	June 8, 1957	Samuel Wilder King
Herbert Young Cho Choy		June 13, 1957	November 30, 1958	Samuel Wilder King William F. Quinn
Jack H. Mizuha		December 16, 1958	1959	William F. Quinn

=== State of Hawaii ===
Attorneys general of the State of Hawaii
Attorney general	Image	Term of office	State governor(s) served under
Jack H. Mizuha		1959	William F. Quinn
Shiro Kashiwa		1959–1960	William F. Quinn
Bert Kobayashi		1962–1969	John A. Burns
Bertram Kanbara		1969–1971	John A. Burns
George T. H. Pai		1971	John A. Burns
Ronald Amemiya		1974–1978	George Ariyoshi
Wayne Minami		1978–1981	George Ariyoshi
Tany S. Hong		1981–1984	George Ariyoshi
Michael A. Lilly		1984–1985	George Ariyoshi
Corinne Watanabe		1985–1986	George Ariyoshi
Warren Price, III		1986–1992	John D. Waiheʻe III
Robert A. Marks		1992–1994	John D. Waiheʻe III
Robert A. Marks		1994–1995	Ben Cayetano
Margery Bronster		1995–1998	Ben Cayetano
Earl I. Anzai		1999–2002	Ben Cayetano
Mark J. Bennett		2003–2010	Linda Lingle
David M. Louie		2011–2014	Neil Abercrombie
Russell Suzuki (Acting)		2014–2015	David Ige
Doug Chin		2015–2018	David Ige
Russell Suzuki		2018–2019	David Ige
Clare E. Connors		2019–2021	David Ige
Holly Shikada		2021–2022	David Ige
Anne E. Lopez		2022–present	Josh Green

== See also ==
- Cabinet of the Kingdom of Hawaii
