= Clare E. Connors =

American attorney (born 1974)

Clare Connors
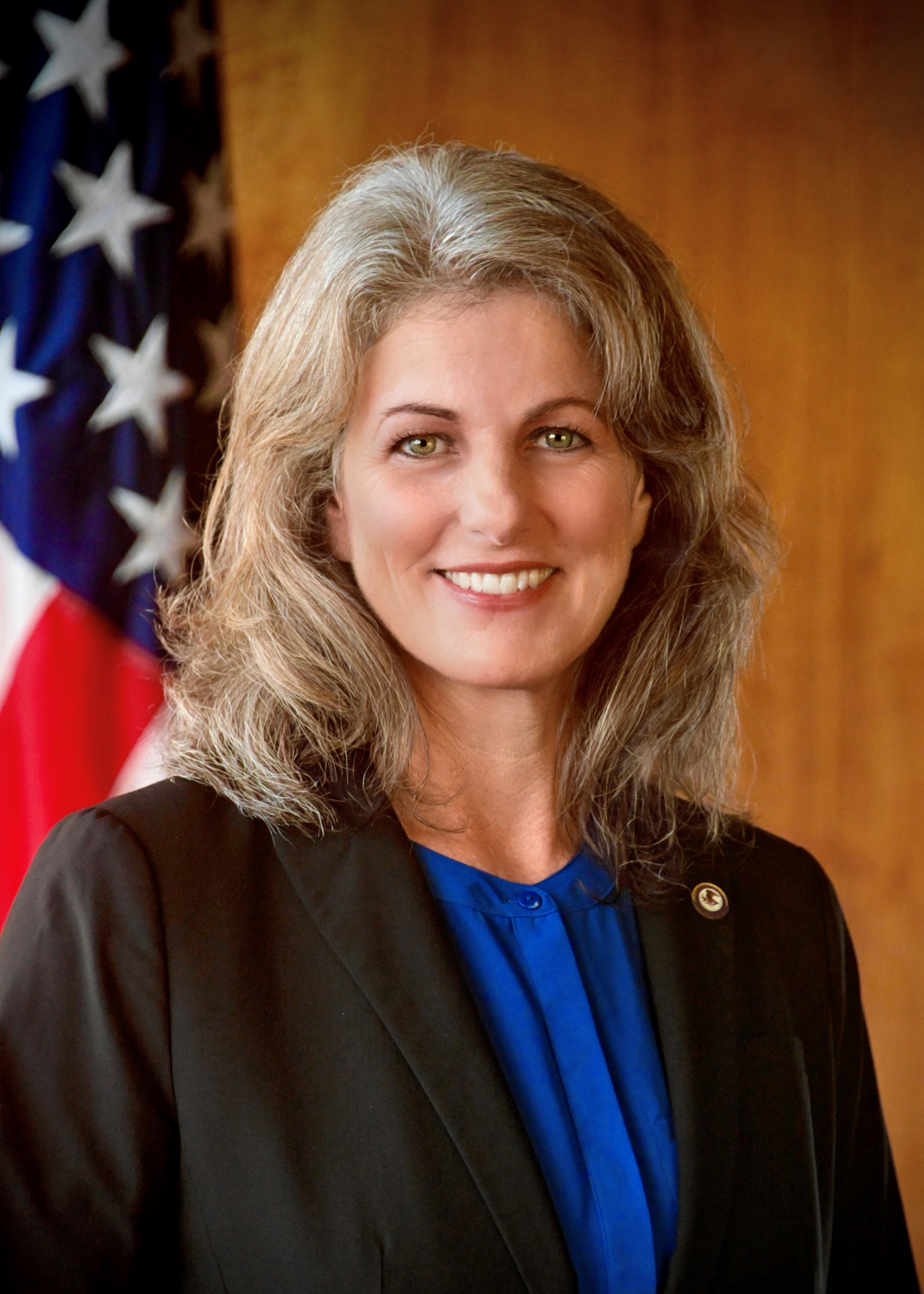
- Connors in 2022

United States Attorney for the District of Hawaii
- In office January 3, 2022 – January 20, 2025
- President: Joe Biden
- Preceded by: Kenji M. Price
- Succeeded by: Ken Sorenson (acting)

16th Attorney General of Hawaii
- In office January 3, 2019 – December 10, 2021; Acting: January 3 – April 22, 2019
- Governor: David Ige
- Preceded by: Russell Suzuki
- Succeeded by: Holly Shikada

Personal details
- Born: Clare Elizabeth Connors; May 1974 (age 52) New York, U.S.
- Party: Democratic
- Education: Yale University (BA); Harvard University (JD)

Clare Elizabeth Connors (born May 1974) is an American lawyer who served as the United States Attorney for the District of Hawaii from 2022 to 2025. She served as the 16th attorney general of Hawaii from January 3, 2019, to December 10, 2021. She was also a former nominee for United States district judge of the United States District Court for the District of Hawaii.

== Early life and education ==
Connors was born in New York and raised in Hawaii and graduated from Punahou School. She subsequently received a Bachelor of Arts degree, cum laude, in 1996 from Yale College and a Juris Doctor from Harvard Law School in 2002.

== Career ==
After graduating from Yale, Conners worked for the New York City Department of Parks and Recreation. She began her legal career as a law clerk for Judge David Alan Ezra of the United States District Court for the District of Hawaii, from 2002 to 2003. From 2003 to 2004, she served as a trial attorney in the Tax Division of the United States Department of Justice and also served on detail as a special assistant United States attorney in the Eastern District of Virginia. From 2004 to 2011, she served as an assistant United States attorney in the Criminal Division of the United States Attorney's Office for the District of Hawaii. From 2011 to 2019, she was an attorney at the law firm of Davis Levin Livingston in Honolulu, Hawaii, where her practice focused on civil litigation.

=== Expired nomination to federal district court ===
On September 8, 2015, President Obama nominated Connors to serve as a United States district judge of the United States District Court for the District of Hawaii, to the seat vacated by Judge Susan Oki Mollway, who assumed senior status on November 6, 2015. She received a hearing on her nomination on January 27, 2016. On April 14, 2016 her nomination was reported out of committee by voice vote. Her nomination expired on January 3, 2017, with the end of the 114th Congress.

=== Appointment as attorney general of Hawaii ===
Connors was appointed attorney general of Hawaii by Governor David Ige on January 3, 2019. On April 22, 2019, Connors was confirmed by the Hawaii State Senate.

=== U.S. attorney for the District of Hawaii ===
On September 28, 2021, President Joe Biden nominated Connors to be the United States attorney for the District of Hawaii. On November 4, 2021, her nomination was reported out of committee by voice vote with senators Lee, Hawley and Blackburn voting "no". On December 7, 2021, Connors was confirmed in the Senate by voice vote. She was sworn into office on January 3, 2022. On January 6, 2025, she resigned from the post, effective January 20.

Legal offices
Preceded by Russell Suzuki	Attorney General of Hawaii; 2019–2021	Succeeded by Holly Shikada
Preceded by Judith Philips; Acting	United States Attorney for the District of Hawaii; 2022–2025	Succeeded by Ken Sorenson; Acting
