= William Canby =

American judge (born 1931)

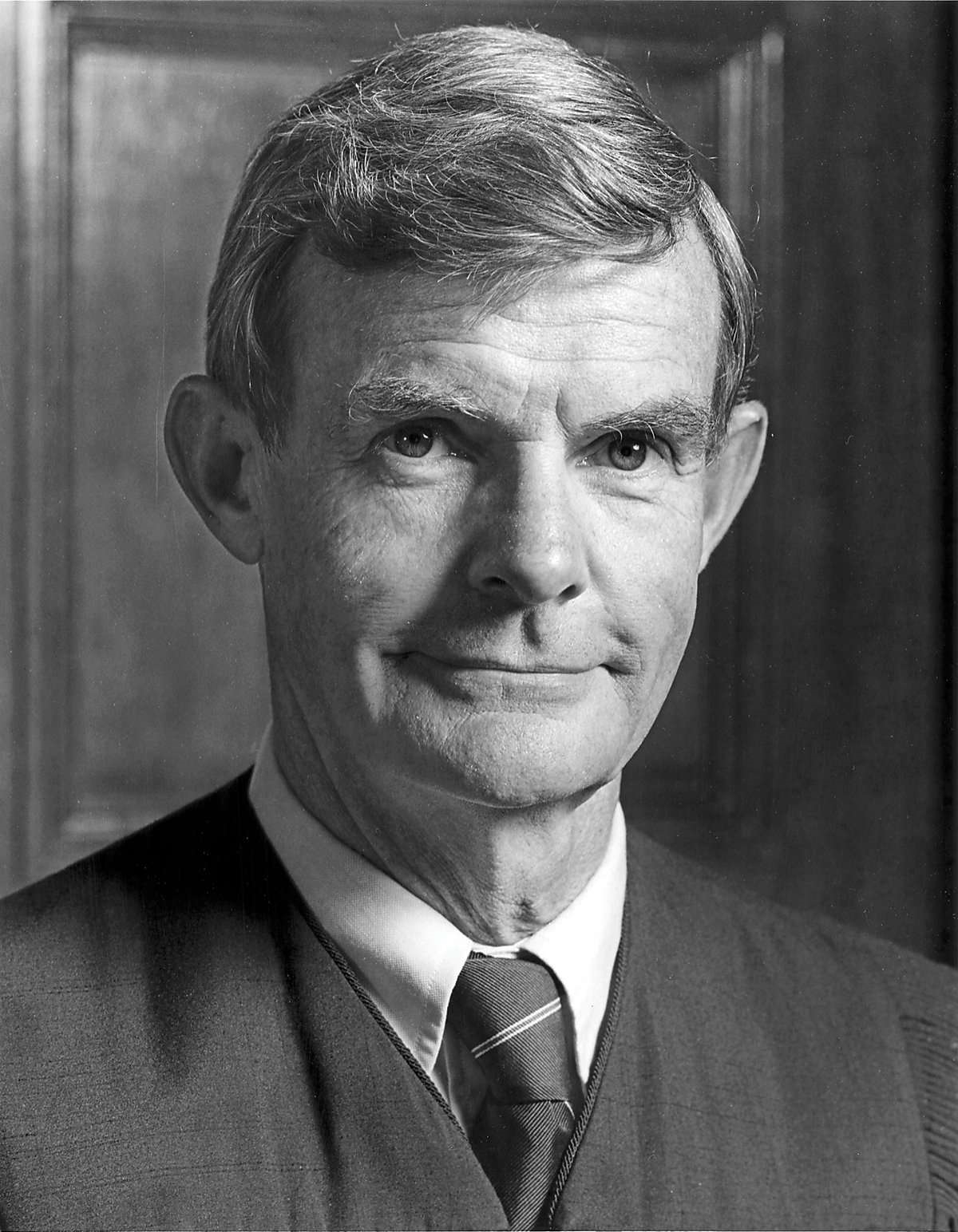

Senior Judge of the United States Court of Appeals for the Ninth Circuit
- Incumbent
- Assumed office May 23, 1996

Judge of the United States Court of Appeals for the Ninth Circuit
- In office May 23, 1980 – May 23, 1996
- Appointed by: Jimmy Carter
- Preceded by: Ozell Miller Trask
- Succeeded by: Barry G. Silverman

Personal details
- Born: William Cameron Canby Jr. May 22, 1931 (age 95) Saint Paul, Minnesota, U.S.
- Education: Yale University (BA); University of Minnesota (LLB)

William Cameron Canby Jr. (born May 22, 1931) is a senior United States circuit judge of the United States Court of Appeals for the Ninth Circuit, sitting in Phoenix, Arizona.

As both a professor at Arizona State University College of Law and a Circuit Judge of the United States Court of Appeals for the Ninth Circuit, Canby has become known as an authority on American Indian law. He has authored law review articles, a major textbook, and the West Nutshell Series primer on the subject. While still a professor at ASU, Canby successfully argued the case of Bates v. State Bar of Arizona, in which the Supreme Court held that the First Amendment allows lawyers to advertise in a manner that is not misleading to members of the general public.

== Education and legal training ==
Born in Saint Paul, Minnesota, Canby earned his Bachelor of Arts degree from Yale University in 1953 on an ROTC scholarship, graduating summa cum laude and Phi Beta Kappa. He then earned a Bachelor of Laws from the University of Minnesota Law School in 1956, graduating Order of the Coif, before clerking for Justice Charles Evans Whittaker of the United States Supreme Court.

== Professional career ==
Canby was a lieutenant in the JAG Corps of the United States Air Force from 1956 to 1958. He was in private practice in Saint Paul from 1959 to 1962 before joining the Peace Corps. He was an associate director of the Peace Corps for Ethiopia from 1962 to 1963 and then deputy director for Ethiopia from 1963 to 1964. He was then Director for Uganda from 1964 to 1966. He was a special assistant to United States Senator Walter Mondale in 1966 before leaving government service.

He was a special assistant to President Harris Wofford of the State University of New York at Old Westbury in 1967 and then a professor of law at Arizona State University from 1967 to 1980 and during that time was Director of the Office of Indian Law at the Arizona State University College of Law. From 1970 to 1971 he was a visiting Fulbright professor of law at Makerere University in Kampala, Uganda.

== Federal judicial service ==
Canby was nominated by President Jimmy Carter on April 2, 1980, to a seat on the United States Court of Appeals for the Ninth Circuit vacated by Judge Ozell Miller Trask. He was confirmed by the United States Senate on May 21, 1980, and received his commission on May 23, 1980. Canby assumed senior status on May 23, 1996.

== Notable rulings ==
In 1995, Canby held that the Tenth Amendment was not violated by provisions of the Brady Handgun Violence Prevention Act that required local and state law enforcement officials to conduct background checks of handgun buyers. The Supreme Court reversed in Printz v. United States.

In 2001, Canby wrote a unanimous panel decision holding that the Americans with Disabilities Act required the Professional Golfers Association to allow disabled golfer Casey Martin to use a golf cart when competing. The opinion was affirmed by the Supreme Court in PGA Tour, Inc. v. Martin.

On February 4, 2017, Canby and Judge Michelle T. Friedland rejected the Trump administration's request for an administrative stay pending the Ninth Circuit's review of an emergency motion to stay the district court's temporary restraining order in State of Washington v. Trump, part of the ongoing court cases related to Executive Order 13769. On February 7 Canby, Friedland, and Judge Richard Clifton heard oral arguments on the emergency motion to stay, with an audio feed of the telephonic argument broadcast nationwide. On February 9, the three judges denied the request for a stay of the temporary restraining order.

On February 19, 2025, Canby was one of three judges to reject the Trump administration's request for a stay of an injunction blocking its attempt to end birthright citizenship.

== See also ==
- List of law clerks for the sixth seat of the Supreme Court of the United States
- List of United States federal judges by longevity of service

Legal offices
Preceded by Ozell Miller Trask	Judge of the United States Court of Appeals for the Ninth Circuit; 1980–1996	Succeeded by Barry G. Silverman
