= Earl I. Anzai =

American politician (1941–2023)

Earl Ichiro Anzai

12th Attorney General of Hawaii
- In office 1999–2002
- Governor: Ben Cayetano
- Preceded by: Margery Bronster
- Succeeded by: Mark J. Bennett

Personal details
- Born: October 4, 1941 Territory of Hawaii, U.S.
- Died: July 23, 2023 (aged 81) Hawaii, U.S.

Earl Ichiro Anzai (Japanese: 安斎 一郎, October 4, 1941 – July 23, 2023) was an American politician who was Attorney General of Hawaii from 1999 to 2002, appointed by Governor of Hawaii Benjamin J. Cayetano. A career Democrat, Anzai also served as state budget director from 1995 to 1999 and Office of Hawaiian Affairs special counsel from 1990 to 1994. From 1968 to 1970, he worked for the federal government in the United States Government Accountability Office. He was admitted to the Hawaii State Bar in October 1981.

== Education ==
Earl Anzai was raised in Hawaii. Anzai graduated from Kahuku High School in rural City & County of Honolulu. He left the islands to study at Emory University and then Oregon State University before successfully obtaining a Bachelor of Arts degree in economics from the University of Hawaiʻi at Mānoa in 1964. In 1966, he obtained a master of arts degree in the same field at the same school. From 1966 to 1968, Anzai received a Ph.D. education but transferred to the William S. Richardson School of Law at the University of Hawaiʻi at Mānoa, where he obtained a doctorate of jurisprudence instead in 1981.

On May 16, 2008, Anzai was finally initiated as a member of the Beta Chi chapter of the Sigma Chi fraternity at Emory University in Atlanta, Georgia. He was also a 1976 alumnus of the National Urban Fellows.

== Death ==
Earl I. Anzi died on July 23, 2023, at the age of 81.

Legal offices
Preceded by Margery Bronster	Attorney General of Hawaii; 1999–2002	Succeeded by Mark J. Bennett
