= Mark J. Bennett =

American judge (born 1953)

Mark Bennett
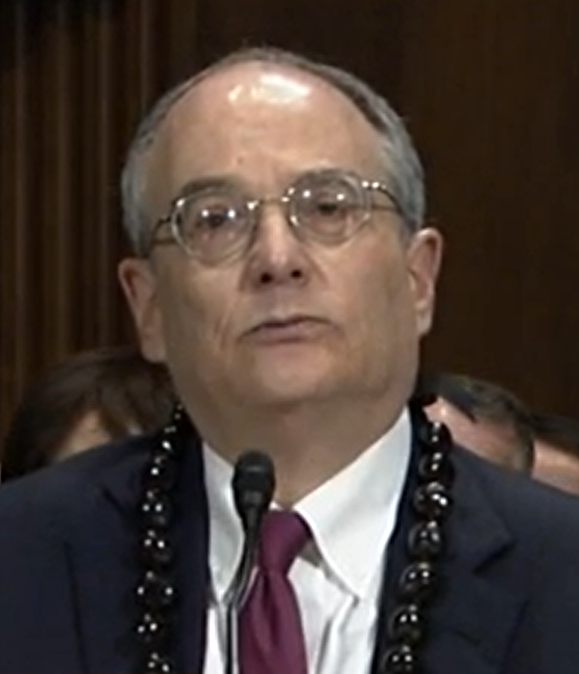

Judge of the United States Court of Appeals for the Ninth Circuit
- Incumbent
- Assumed office July 13, 2018
- Appointed by: Donald Trump
- Preceded by: Richard Clifton

12th Attorney General of Hawaii
- In office January 3, 2003 – December 6, 2010
- Governor: Linda Lingle
- Preceded by: Earl I. Anzai
- Succeeded by: David M. Louie

Personal details
- Born: Mark Jeremy Bennett; February 24, 1953 (age 73) New York City, New York, U.S.
- Party: Republican
- Education: Union College, New York (BA); Cornell University (JD)

Mark Jeremy Bennett (born February 24, 1953) is a United States circuit judge of the United States Court of Appeals for the Ninth Circuit.

== Career ==
In 1976, Bennett obtained his Bachelor of Arts degree in political science from Union College in Schenectady. He attended Cornell Law School in Ithaca where he sat on the Board of Editors of the Cornell Law Review. There, he received his Juris Doctor in 1979. After leaving law school, Bennett became a law clerk to Chief Judge Samuel Pailthorpe King of the United States District Court for the District of Hawaii. Completing his clerkship, Bennett served as an Assistant United States Attorney for the District of Columbia from 1980 to 1982 and for the District of Hawaii until 1990. In 1991, Bennett went into private legal practice as a partner at the firm of McCorriston Miller Mukai MacKinnon LLP. At the same time, he worked pro-bono for the attorney general's office and taught at the William S. Richardson School of Law. He served as Attorney General of Hawaii from 2003 to 2010 in the two-term administration of Republican Governor Linda Lingle.

Bennett served as Acting Governor of Hawaii from August 25 to September 3, 2004, upon the absence of Governor Linda Lingle and lieutenant governor Duke Aiona. The executives left the Hawaiian Islands to attend the 2004 Republican National Convention in New York City.

== Federal judicial service ==
On February 12, 2018, President Donald Trump announced his intent to nominate Bennett to an undetermined seat on the United States Court of Appeals for the Ninth Circuit. On February 15, 2018, his nomination was sent to the Senate. Bennett was nominated for the seat vacated by Judge Richard Clifton, who assumed senior status on December 31, 2016. On April 11, 2018, a hearing on his nomination was held before the Senate Judiciary Committee. On May 10, 2018, his nomination was reported out of committee by an 18–2 vote. On July 9, 2018, the United States Senate invoked cloture on his nomination by a 72–25 vote. On July 10, 2018, his nomination was confirmed by a 72–27 vote. Most of the 27 votes against his confirmation came from Republican Senators due to his defense of Hawaii's restrictive firearms laws in court. He received his judicial commission on July 13, 2018.

On August 16, 2019, Bennett was in the majority of a split panel for the Ninth Circuit which blocked new asylum restrictions by the Trump administration within its own jurisdiction but declined to block the new asylum rules across the entire nation.

In September 2020, Bennett dissented when the panel majority found that a robocall defendant could not use the Federal Arbitration Act to compel enforcement of a customer agreement the plaintiff had signed years earlier with a separate company that had subsequently been acquired by the holding company that now also owned the defendant.

On December 4, 2021, Bennett was one of two judges who declined to halt San Diego Unified School District's requirements that students be vaccinated by December 20.

On September 6, 2022, Bennett wrote a concurring opinion in the 9th circuit decision upholding Washington's ban on conversion therapy for minors. The Supreme Court denied certiorari on December 11, 2023.

In June 2025, Bennett ruled that President Trump can keep control of the California National Guard in the wake of ICE raids.

== Personal life ==
Bennett is married to Honolulu attorney Patricia Tomi Ohara. He has been a member of the Federalist Society since 2016.

Legal offices
Preceded by Earl I. Anzai	Attorney General of Hawaii; 2003–2010	Succeeded by David M. Louie
Preceded by Richard Clifton	Judge of the United States Court of Appeals for the Ninth Circuit; 2018–present	Incumbent
