= Doug Chin =

13th Lieutenant Governor of Hawaii

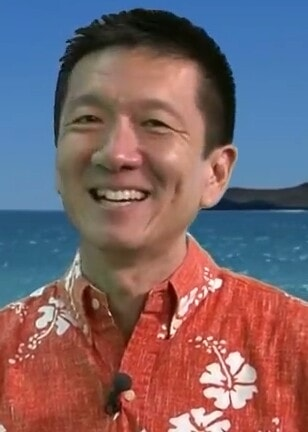

14th Lieutenant Governor of Hawaii
- In office February 2, 2018 – December 3, 2018
- Governor: David Ige
- Preceded by: Shan Tsutsui
- Succeeded by: Josh Green

14th Attorney General of Hawaii
- In office March 12, 2015 – February 2, 2018
- Governor: David Ige
- Preceded by: David M. Louie
- Succeeded by: Russell Suzuki

Personal details
- Born: Douglas Shih-Ging Chin; July 21, 1966 (age 59) Seattle, Washington, U.S.
- Party: Democratic
- Spouse: Kathleen Chin
- Children: 2
- Education: Stanford University (BA); University of Hawaii, Manoa (JD)

Douglas Shih-Ging Chin (born July 21, 1966) is an American attorney and politician who served as the 14th lieutenant governor of Hawaii from February to December 2018. A member of the Democratic Party, Chin previously was the 14th Attorney General of Hawaii. On December 18, 2017, Chin announced his intent to run for the U.S. House of Representatives. In February 2018, Chin became Lieutenant Governor of Hawaii after the resignation of Shan Tsutsui and after two others in the line of succession declined the office. In August 2018, he lost the congressional seat's Democratic nomination to Ed Case.

== Early life and education ==
Douglas S. Chin was born in Seattle to Chinese immigrant parents, his mother a librarian, and his father a civil engineer. He grew up studying violin and piano. He earned a Bachelor of Arts in English from Stanford University and his Juris Doctor from the William S. Richardson School of Law at the University of Hawaiʻi at Mānoa.

== Career ==
Chin started his legal career at the Honolulu prosecutor’s office in 1998, where he tried approximately fifty jury cases to verdict. Chin obtained guilty verdicts in notorious cases including a brutal rape-murder committed by the victim’s neighbor and a serial rapist of Honolulu prostitutes. He was recognized with a "Top Gun" award for winning the most trials in a calendar year out of 100 Honolulu prosecutors. In 2006, Chin was appointed chief deputy prosecutor and later acting prosecutor in 2010.

=== Managing director for the city and county of Honolulu ===
From 2010 to 2013, under Honolulu mayor Peter B. Carlisle, Chin served as managing director for the City and County of Honolulu. Chin was directly responsible for 23 municipal government and public safety agencies and approximately 10,000 employees with an annual operating budget of $2 billion. In 2011, Chin oversaw city operations during the Asia-Pacific Economic Cooperation meeting in Honolulu, the first time the summit of nations was held in the United States.

=== Law partner and corporate lobbyist ===
From 2013 to 2015, Chin was a law partner and eventual managing partner at Carlsmith Ball, one of the oldest and largest law firms in the state of Hawai‘i. His areas of practice included renewable energy and clean technology projects, land use and development projects and commercial litigation.

In August 2013, Chin registered as a lobbyist for Corrections Corporation of America (now known as CoreCivic), and subsequently successfully lobbied to house Hawaiian prisoners in Arizona.

=== Attorney General of Hawaii ===
Governor David Ige nominated Chin for Attorney General of Hawaii in January 2015. The Hawaii Senate was unanimous in its confirmation of Chin on March 12, 2015.

Chin also led a suit on behalf of the State of Hawaii against the federal government that, on March 15, 2017, blocked implementation of President Donald Trump's Executive Order 13780 entitled, "Protecting the Nation from Foreign Terrorist Entry into the United States".

Chin filed a motion asking for clarification on what a bona fide relationship with someone in the United States means. This was in leading the fight against the travel ban imposed by president Donald Trump, after the Supreme Court allowed it to go into partial effect in late June 2017. An expedited process was requested for the clarification.

=== Congressional campaign and Lieutenant Governorship ===
On December 18, 2017, Chin announced he would run for Hawaii's 1st congressional district in 2018 to succeed the retiring Colleen Hanabusa. In January 2018, he announced he would resign as Attorney General effective March 15, 2018 in order to focus on his congressional campaign.

On January 31, 2018, Lieutenant Governor Shan Tsutsui resigned from his office. By law, the attorney general is third in the line of succession to the office of lieutenant governor, but Hawaii Senate president Ron Kouchi and Hawaii House of Representatives Speaker Scott Saiki turned down the job. Chin continued to serve as Lieutenant Governor while running for Congress, and lost the August 2018 Democratic primary to Ed Case.

== Political positions ==
=== Campaign finance reform ===
Chin received the endorsement of End Citizens United in his Congressional campaign and signed a pledge to reject corporate political action committee contributions. Chin previously indicated support for enacting the Democracy for All Amendment to U.S. Constitution to overturn Supreme Court decisions – including Citizens United, Buckley v. Valeo, and McCutcheon v. FEC – which Chin said "have given the largest corporations and the wealthiest individuals more influence than ever in our political system.

=== Health care ===
Chin supports the merits of a universal healthcare system. He also supports giving Medicare additional powers to negotiate lower prescription drug prices for seniors.

=== Environment ===
Chin has been a strong advocate for preserving Hawai‘i's natural resources and protecting the environment. He supports Hawai‘i's plan to make a transition to 100% renewable energy by 2045, and he signed a pledge for Hawai‘i to uphold the commitments in the Paris Climate Agreement despite Trump’s plans to withdraw from it. Chin opposed Scott Pruitt’s EPA nomination and resisted the current administration’s attempts to roll back the Clean Water Act.

Chin has supported preservation movements, such as those with the Papahānaumokuākea Marine National Monument and protecting coastlines along O‘ahu’s North Shore. In Congress, Chin wants to expand funding to Hawaii for sustainable source expansion, protect parks from fracking and drilling, and work towards reducing greenhouse gas emissions.

Chin received the endorsement of Ocean Champions, an organization dedicated to protecting the world's oceans, in his Congressional campaign.

=== Transgender rights ===
As Attorney General, Chin led 18 states and the District of Columbia asking Congress to pass legislation prohibiting discrimination against transgender service members to include transgender protections in the National Defense Authorization Act. The letter says President Donald Trump's policy banning transgender service members from the military "violates fundamental constitutional and American values".

=== Abortion ===
In Calvary Chapel versus Chin Attorney General Chin was sued by a national anti-abortion religious organization for enforcing Act 200 requiring pregnancy counseling centers to advertise contraception and abortion "services

Chin is strongly pro-choice and "doesn't believe it is his place – or the government's– to stand between a woman and her doctor".

=== Same-sex marriage advocate ===
Chin successfully defended Hawaii’s Marriage Equality Act of 2013 in Hawaii Supreme Court case brought by Representative Bob McDermott attempting to invalidate the 2013 Act and restrict the rights of same-sex couples.

=== LGBT rights ===
Arguing that a business owner’s personal beliefs do not give him a right to discriminate against customers, a coalition of 20 states led by Chin and Massachusetts Attorney General Maura Healey, filed an amicus brief with the US Supreme Court defending the constitutionality of Colorado’s public accommodations law. Chin said, "All citizens deserve fair and equal treatment. We must vigilantly fight discrimination in all of its forms."

=== Criminal justice reform ===
Chin supports enacting commonsense criminal justice reforms to reduce U.S. incarceration rates, and focus more on rehabilitation and recovery. "The U.S. criminal justice system treats the rich and guilty better than the poor and innocent. We must do better," Chin said. He also pledged to use his experience as a prosecutor to advocate for criminal justice reforms to sharply reduce America's "immoral over-incarceration rates which have disproportionately impacted minority populations."

=== Gun control ===
Chin believes that Hawai‘i has the lowest gun death rate in the nation because it has passed legislation that limits who and what types of weapons the people of Hawai‘i may possess. Chin received the "Gun Sense Candidate" distinction from Moms Demand Action for Gun Sense in America is a grassroots movement of Americans fighting for new and stronger solutions to lax gun laws and loopholes.

=== Immigration ===
Indicating his support for comprehensive immigration reform, Chin called the current immigration system "failed and outdated" and called for it to "recognize the critical contributions and harness the talents of America’s immigrants." Chin supports passing the DREAM Act and expressed a desire to expand family reunification policies and provide a pathway to citizenship for the millions of undocumented immigrants living in America.

=== Foreign policy ===
Chin said "the might of the U.S. military should only be brought to bear when all efforts at diplomacy have failed and when America, or our interests, are threatened with imminent harm." Chin has been critical of what he describes as President Donald Trump's "dangerous tendency to conduct U.S. foreign policy via Twitter – even as he undercuts real diplomacy by failing to staff the State Department." He has previously indicated supporting a vote to repeal and replace the Authorization for Use of Military Force, a measure passed in the wake of the September 11 attacks, which he says "has been used by presidents of both parties to engage in short-sighted and destabilizing military campaigns in places like Iraq and Libya."

== Controversy ==
=== Anti-Gay Speech and Conversion Therapy ===
In 1995, Douglas Chin, then 27 years old, delivered an anti-gay speech at the Oahu Church of Christ. A recording was made of Chin angrily yelling:

'But-but-but-but-but-but-but-but-but-but-but-but-but-but-but-but-but-but-but [sic] my family taught me something different. My family taught me something different than what the Bible teaches.' Well- Okay. The bible is right, your family is wrong [about tolerance of homosexuality]. Is there any shame in that? Hey! What’s so bad about that? God is right. Your family is wrong. Is there anything wrong with that? That's fine! Okay. Let’s do something constructive with that. Amen? 'But-but-but-but [sic] my ...'

On February 19, 2018, during the race for Congress, Chin, Lieutenant Governor at that time, said he had "really grown up since [1995] and I regret if I had any sort of tone." He further said, "I apologize if I used anything that caused people to feel uncomfortable or overly guilty."

Chin noted that, as Attorney General, he defended the Hawaii Marriage Equality Act in the Hawaii Supreme Court and fought the Trump Administration to defend the rights of transgender service members, and, as Lieutenant Governor, announced his support for a proposal to ban gay conversion therapy.

== Personal life ==
He lives in Honolulu.

== See also ==
- List of minority governors and lieutenant governors in the United States

Legal offices
Preceded by Russell Suzuki; Acting	Attorney General of Hawaii; 2015–2018	Succeeded by Russell Suzuki
Political offices
Preceded by Shan Tsutsui	Lieutenant Governor of Hawaii; 2018	Succeeded by Josh Green
