= David M. Louie =

American attorney general

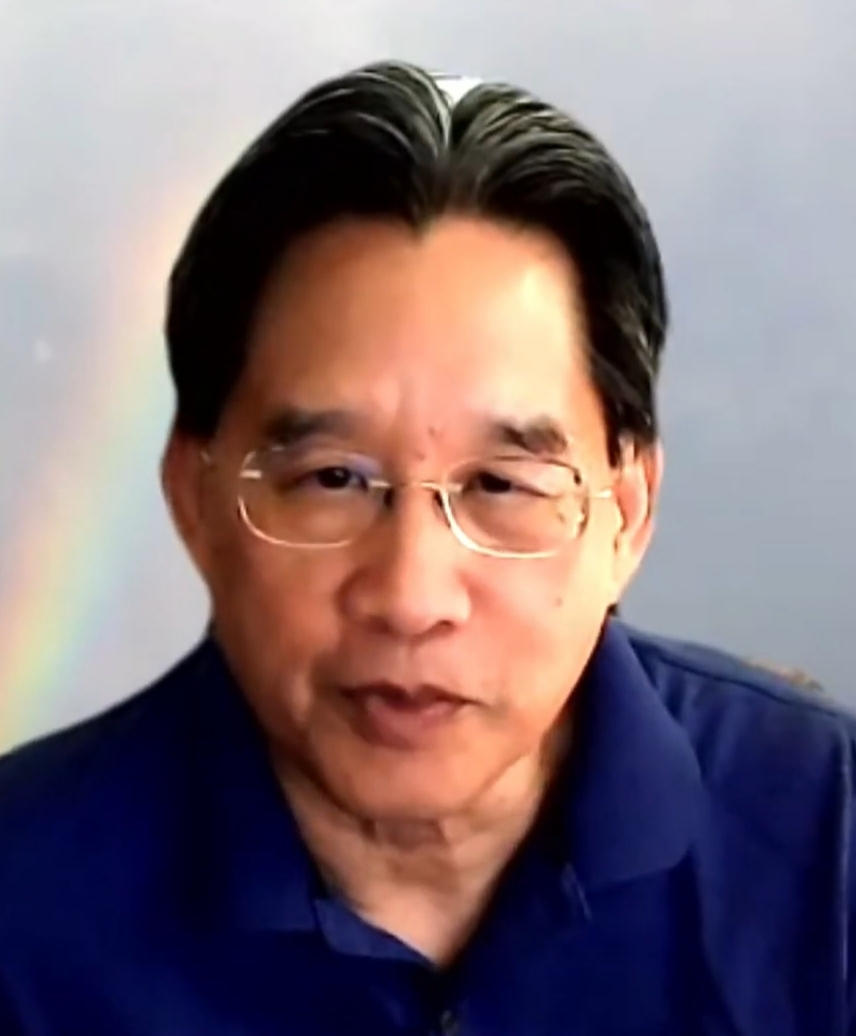

13th Attorney General of Hawaii
- In office January 2011 – December 1, 2014
- Governor: Neil Abercrombie
- Preceded by: Mark J. Bennett
- Succeeded by: Doug Chin

Personal details
- Born: October 8, 1951 (age 74) Oakland, California, U.S.
- Party: Democratic
- Spouse: Johanna C. Chuan
- Education: Occidental College; UC Berkeley School of Law

David M. Louie (born October 8, 1951) is an American lawyer who served as Attorney General of Hawaii from 2011 to 2014.

== Early life and education ==
Born in Oakland, Louie was raised in Los Angeles by his father Paul and mother Emma. He is a third generation Chinese American. His father, Presbyterian minister and Seattle-native Paul Louie, was one of three founders of the Chinese Historical Society of Southern California and a member of the Los Angeles Human Relations Commission. Louie attended Occidental College in Eagle Rock, Los Angeles where he graduated with a bachelor of arts degree in 1973 before attending Boalt Hall School of Law at University of California, Berkeley where he obtained his Juris Doctor in 1977. He was then admitted to the State Bar of California that same year. In 1978, Louie was admitted to the Hawaii State Bar and the bar of the United States District Court for the District of Hawaii.

== Legal career ==
From 1977 to 1988, Louie was an associate and partner at Case & Lynch in Honolulu. In 1988, Louie became a partner of Honolulu law firm Roeca, Louie and Hiraoka (RLH), and was the managing partner from 1988 to 2010, practicing in the areas of civil litigation, insurance defense, construction defect litigation and commercial litigation.

Louie served as Director, Vice President and President of the Hawaii State Bar Association from 1995 to 2001. Louie also served as Vice-President, Secretary-Treasurer, and a Director of the Hawaii Defense Lawyers Association (1993–2010). From 1999 to 2006, Louie also served as Director and Chairman of the Aloha Tower Development Corporation (ATDC), a state agency charged with developing the land around the Aloha Tower to benefit the state's commercial trade industry based at Honolulu harbor while at the same time providing the residents of Hawaii with ample access to the downtown waterfront.

In 1999, Louie was appointed to the board of directors of the Hawaii Supreme Court Special Committee on Judicial Performance and at the time of appointment to the attorney general's office, served as its vice chairman. Louie served as Lawyer Representative for the United States Court of Appeals Ninth Circuit from 2005 to 2008. From 2008 to 2010, he served as Northwest Regional Governor for the National Asian Pacific American Bar Association. While in private practice, Louie was named a Hawaii Super Lawyer (2008–2011).

Louie was appointed on December 19, 2010, by Democratic Governor Neil Abercrombie as Attorney General of Hawaii. The chief legal officer is not an elected office and is appointed by the Governor in accordance with Article V, Section 6 of the Constitution of Hawaii, subject to confirmation by the Hawaii Senate.

After serving a four-year term under Governor Neil Abercrombie, Louie returned to private practice as a partner at the law firm of Kobayashi Sugita & Goda, LLP, where he handles matters relating to commercial litigation, construction litigation, complex personal injury defense matters, government relations and lobbying.

In 2016, Louie was inducted as a Fellow in the American College of Trial Lawyers. He is a member of Society of Attorneys General Emeritus, and while serving as Attorney General, was a member of the National Association of Attorneys General and the Conference of Western Attorneys General. He is a member of the Federation of Defense and Corporate Counsel, where he was a past Co-Chair for the Premises Liability Section, and a past Chair of the Diversity Committee. He is a member of the National Asian Pacific American Bar Association, and received a Daniel K. Inouye Trailblazer Award from NAPABA in 2015. He received the Occidental College Alumni Seal Award for Community Service in 2013. He is a member of the Association of Defense Trial Attorneys, the Defense Research Institute and the American Bar Association. Louie has been a faculty member and lecturer for numerous continuing legal education seminars for the Hawaii State Bar Association, Federation of Defense and Corporate Counsel, National Asian Pacific American Bar Association, American Bar Association, Pacific Law Institute, Professional Education Systems, Inc. and the National Business Institute. He has authored a number of published articles regarding trial techniques and legal issues.

David Louie is a registered lobbyist in Hawaii according to the Hawaii Ethics Commission. Louie lobbies for the Internet Association, Facebook, and AirBnB. Lobbying topics include Government Operation and Finance, Hawaiian Affairs, Planning and Land Use Management, Science, Technology and Economic Development, Labor and Employment, Housing, Communications and Public Utilities, Consumer Protection and Commerce, Tourism & Recreation, Technology, and Other including "Transient Accommodations".

Louie has been retained by the State of Hawaii as a Special Deputy Attorney General on matters pertaining to the Board of Hawaii Department of Land and Natural Resources and Board of Trustees of the Employees' Retirement System of the State of Hawaii.

== Personal life ==
He is married to Johanna C. Chuan.
