= John J. Tuchi =

American judge (born 1964)

Judge of the United States District Court for the District of Arizona
- Incumbent
- Assumed office May 16, 2014
- Appointed by: Barack Obama
- Preceded by: Roslyn O. Silver

Personal details
- Born: John Joseph Tuchi; 1964 (age 61–62) Colver, Pennsylvania, U.S.
- Education: West Virginia University (BS); University of Arizona (MS); Arizona State University (JD)

John Joseph Tuchi (born 1964) is an American lawyer who is a United States district judge of the United States District Court for the District of Arizona.

== Early life and education ==
Tuchi was born in 1964 in Colver, Pennsylvania. He studied engineering at West Virginia University, graduating in 1987 with a Bachelor of Science degree. He received a Master of Science degree from the University of Arizona in 1989.

Tuchi was a project engineer at the Hughes Aircraft Company from 1987 to 1989, then worked as a consultant for Arthur Andersen from 1989 to 1991. He then attended Arizona State University's College of Law (now Sandra Day O'Connor College of Law), where he was editor-in-chief of the Arizona State Law Journal. He graduated in 1994 with a Juris Doctor magna cum laude and Order of the Coif membership.

== Career ==
Tuchi served as a law clerk to Judge William Canby of the United States Court of Appeals for the Ninth Circuit from 1994 to 1995. He was in private practice as an associate at the law firm of Brown & Bain (now part of Perkins Coie) from 1995 to 1998.

From 1998 to 2014, Tuchi was an assistant United States attorney for the District of Arizona. He served as Chief of the Criminal Division, from 2006 to 2009, as Senior Litigation Counsel and Tribal Liaison from 2009 to 2012, interim United States attorney in 2012 and later served as chief assistant United States attorney.

=== Federal judicial service ===
On September 19, 2013, President Barack Obama nominated Tuchi to serve as a United States district judge of the United States District Court for the District of Arizona, to the seat vacated by Judge Roslyn O. Silver, who assumed senior status on September 3, 2013. Tuchi was one of four Arizona judicial nominees announced by Obama that day who were chosen in consultation with Republican Senators John McCain and Jeff Flake. On February 27, 2014 his nomination was reported out of the committee. On May 12, 2014 Senate Majority Leader Harry Reid filed for cloture on the nomination. On May 14, 2014, the United States Senate invoked cloture on his nomination by a 62–35 vote. Later that day, his nomination was confirmed by a 96–0 vote. He received his judicial commission on May 16, 2014.

=== Notable rulings ===
- Tuchi was one of the judges who presided over Kari Lake's challenge of the Arizona gubernatorial election results during the 2022 Midterm elections. Tuchi ruled on December 1, 2022, that Lake's claims that proper election procedures weren't followed, citing insufficient evidence. Attorneys for Lake and GOP Arizona Secretary of State nominee Mark Finchem, but not the candidates themselves, were ordered to pay the county's reasonable attorney's fees, the amount of which is to be determined at a later date.
- On July 22, 2023, Tuchi ruled that an Arizona law limiting how close people can get to recording law enforcement is unconstitutional.

== Personal ==
Tuchi is married to Maricopa County Superior Court Judge Maria del Mar Verdin.

Legal offices
Preceded by Roslyn O. Silver	Judge of the United States District Court for the District of Arizona; 2014–present	Incumbent
