= Susan Richard Nelson =

American judge (born 1952)

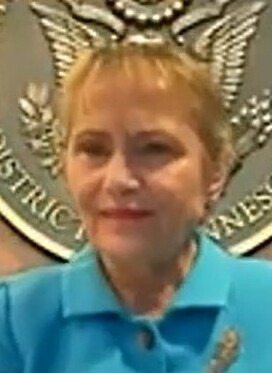
- Nelson in 2022

Senior Judge of the United States District Court for the District of Minnesota
- Incumbent
- Assumed office December 31, 2021

Judge of the United States District Court for the District of Minnesota
- In office December 21, 2010 – December 31, 2021
- Appointed by: Barack Obama
- Preceded by: James M. Rosenbaum
- Succeeded by: Jerry W. Blackwell

Magistrate Judge of the United States District Court for the District of Minnesota
- In office June 12, 2000 – December 21, 2010

Personal details
- Born: Susan Beth Richard; March 22, 1952 (age 74) Buffalo, New York, U.S.
- Education: Oberlin College (BA); University of Pittsburgh (JD)

Susan Beth Richard Nelson (born March 22, 1952) is a senior United States district judge for the United States District Court for the District of Minnesota. She was previously a United States magistrate judge with the same court.

== Early life and education ==
Nelson was born in Buffalo, New York and graduated from Oberlin College with a Bachelor of Arts degree with high honors in 1974 and received her Juris Doctor from the University of Pittsburgh School of Law. Nelson's first job was a camp counselor and waterfront director at Camp Interlocken in Windsor, New Hampshire during the summers of 1973 and 1974. Later in 1974, Nelson became a bank teller at the First Federal Savings & Loan in Pittsburgh, Pennsylvania. Between January and June 1975 she worked was a waitress at Stouffers Restaurant and later at the Pittsburgh YMCA as a camp counselor for the summer.

== Career ==
Nelson's first professional employment was an unpaid internship with the Pennsylvania Department of Environmental Protection and then as a summer associate with the law firm of Reed, Smith, Shaw & McClay in Pittsburgh from 1977 through 1980. From 1980 to 1983 she worked as an associate with the firm of Tyler, Cooper & Alcorn in New Haven, Connecticut. From 1984 to 2000 Nelson worked as an associate (promoted to partner in 1988) with the law firm of Robins, Kaplan, Miller & Ciresi L.L.P. in Minneapolis, Minnesota. As a partner with Robins, Kaplan, Miller & Ciresi her civil trial practice involved complex product liability and mass tort lawsuits in Minnesota and the United States, including the 1998 landmark tobacco trial. Nelson also worked in various positions with Minnesota Women Lawyers since 1996.

=== Federal judicial service ===
Nelson was appointed as United States magistrate judge for the District of Minnesota, and took the oath of office on June 12, 2000. She filled a new position and became the sixth magistrate judge.

Nelson was recommended to President Barack Obama for a seat on the United States District Court for the District of Minnesota by Senator Amy Klobuchar on November 3, 2009. On April 21, 2010, Obama nominated Nelson to the court, for the seat vacated by James M. Rosenbaum. She was confirmed by the Senate with unanimous consent on December 17, 2010. She received her commission on December 22, 2010. Nelson assumed senior status on December 31, 2021.

Legal offices
Preceded by James M. Rosenbaum	Judge of the United States District Court for the District of Minnesota; 2010–2021	Succeeded by Jerry W. Blackwell
