= Jerry W. Blackwell =

American judge (born 1962)

Jerry Blackwell
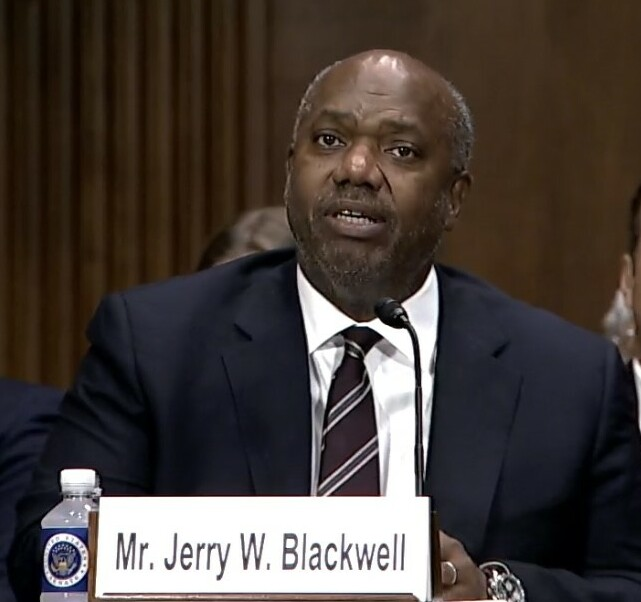
- Blackwell in 2022

Judge of the United States District Court for the District of Minnesota
- Incumbent
- Assumed office December 20, 2022
- Appointed by: Joe Biden
- Preceded by: Susan Richard Nelson

Personal details
- Born: Jerry Wayne Blackwell; 1962 (age 63–64) Mooresville, North Carolina, U.S.
- Education: University of North Carolina at Chapel Hill (BA, JD)

Jerry Wayne Blackwell (born 1962) is an American lawyer who serves as a United States district judge of the United States District Court for the District of Minnesota. Before becoming a judge, he was one of the prosecutors in the trial of Derek Chauvin for the murder of George Floyd.

== Education ==
On a Morehead-Cain Scholarship, Blackwell earned a Bachelor of Science from the University of North Carolina at Chapel Hill in 1984. He received a Juris Doctor from the University of North Carolina School of Law in 1987.

== Career ==
From 1987 to 2022, Blackwell was a lawyer in private practice. He worked as a partner at Robins Kaplan LLP in Minneapolis from 1987 to 1996 and Nilan Johnson Lewis from 1996 to 2000. From 2000 to 2006, he was a partner at Blackwell Igbanugo in Edina, Minnesota, one of the nation's largest Black-owned law firms before it was dissolved. In 2006, he co-founded the law firm Blackwell Burke in Minneapolis.

=== Notable cases ===
During his career, Blackwell represented Prince.

In 2020, Blackwell obtained a posthumous pardon of Max Mason, a Black man falsely convicted in Duluth, Minnesota, of raping a white woman in 1920.

Blackwell was a special assistant state attorney general for the prosecution during the trial of Derek Chauvin, the Minneapolis police officer who murdered George Floyd. Blackwell served as a pro bono prosecutor and delivered the opening statement and closing argument for the prosecution. In closing, he said to the jury, "You were told, for example, that Mr. Floyd died because his heart was too big. You heard that testimony. Now having seen all the evidence, having heard all the evidence, you know the truth. And the truth of the matter is that the reason George Floyd is dead is because Mr. Chauvin's heart was too small."

=== Federal judicial service ===
On June 15, 2022, President Joe Biden nominated Blackwell to serve as a United States district judge of the United States District Court for the District of Minnesota to the seat vacated by Judge Susan Richard Nelson, who assumed senior status on December 31, 2021. On July 27, 2022, a hearing on his nomination was held before the Senate Judiciary Committee. On September 15, 2022, his nomination was reported out of committee by a 13–8 vote, Senator Thom Tillis "passed" on the vote. On December 1, 2022, the United States Senate invoked cloture on his nomination by a 54–42 vote. On December 7, 2022, his nomination was confirmed by a 51–43 vote. He received his judicial commission on December 20, 2022.

== Personal life ==
Blackwell is a hobby farmer and beekeeper.

== See also ==
- List of African-American federal judges
- List of African-American jurists

Legal offices
Preceded by Susan Richard Nelson	Judge of the United States District Court for the District of Minnesota; 2022–present	Incumbent
