= Earl Carroll (disambiguation) =

Earl Carroll (1893–1948) was an American theatrical producer, director, songwriter and composer.

Earl Carroll may also refer to:

- Earl Carroll (vocalist) (1937–2012), doo wop singer
- Earl H. Carroll (1925–2017), American judge
