= Judge Rosenbaum =

Judge Rosenbaum may refer to:

- James M. Rosenbaum (born 1944), judge of the United States District Court for the District of Minnesota
- Robin S. Rosenbaum (born 1966), judge of the United States Court of Appeals for the Eleventh Circuit
