= Matthew Joyce =

Matthew or Matt Joyce may refer to:

- Matt Joyce (American football) (born 1972), former National Football League offensive lineman
- Matt Joyce (baseball) (born 1984), Major League Baseball outfielder
- Matthew M. Joyce (1877–1956), U.S. federal judge
- Matthew William Joyce, filmmaker, magazine editor and activist
- Matthew Ingle Joyce (died 1930), British judge
