= Trial of Derek Chauvin =

2021 murder trial in the U.S. state of Minnesota

State v. Chauvin
- Court: Fourth Judicial District Court of Minnesota
- Full case name: State of Minnesota v. Derek Michael Chauvin
- Submitted: May 29, 2020
- Decided: April 20, 2021
- Verdict: Guilty on all counts: Second-degree murder; Third-degree murder; Second-degree manslaughter
- Defendant: Derek Chauvin
- Prosecution: Keith Ellison (Attorney General); Erin Eldridge; Jerry W. Blackwell; Matthew Frank (lead); Steve Schleicher
- Defense: Eric Nelson
- Citation: 27-CR-20-12646
- Legislation cited: Minnesota Statutes §§ 609.19.2(1) (Murder in the Second Degree—Unintentional); 609.195(a) (Murder in the Third Degree); 609.205(1) (Manslaughter in the Second Degree)

Case history
- Subsequent actions: Chauvin sentenced to 22 1/2 years in prison.; Conviction affirmed by the Minnesota Supreme Court.; Petition for a writ of certiorari rejected by the United States Supreme Court.
- Related actions: MN v. Thao 27-CR-20-12949; MN v. Lane 27-CR-20-12951; MN v. Kueng 27-CR-20-12953

Court membership
- Judge sitting: Peter A. Cahill

State of Minnesota v. Derek Michael Chauvin was an American criminal case in the District Court of Minnesota in 2021. Former Minneapolis police officer Derek Chauvin was tried and convicted for the murder of George Floyd, which occurred during an arrest on May 25, 2020, and led to global protests over racial injustice and police brutality. A 12-member jury found Chauvin guilty of unintentional second-degree murder, third-degree murder, and second-degree manslaughter. It was the first conviction of a white police officer in Minnesota for the murder of a black person.

The trial was held at the Hennepin County Government Center in Minneapolis, and it ran from March 8 to April 20, 2021. It was the first criminal trial in Minnesota to be entirely televised and the first to be broadcast live. The trial received extensive media coverage, with over 23 million people watching the verdict being announced on live television. Several protest marches and demonstrations were held up to and during the trial. Large crowds celebrated the guilty verdict announcement.

Chauvin was sentenced by the trial judge to 22 1/2 years in prison for second-degree murder, 10 years more than the presumptive sentence under the sentencing guideline of 12 1/2 years, due to Chauvin's abuse of power and his particular cruelty inflicted on Floyd. The first charge could have carried a maximum penalty of forty years in prison. Chauvin appealed his conviction, but the guilty verdict was upheld by the Minnesota Supreme Court. The United States Supreme Court declined to review the case.

== Background ==
=== Murder of George Floyd ===
Derek Chauvin was one of four officers of the Minneapolis Police Department (MPD) involved in the arrest of George Floyd on May 25, 2020, on suspicion of using a counterfeit $20 bill at a market. He also served as the field training officer for one of the other officers involved. While Floyd was handcuffed and lying facedown on the street, Chauvin knelt on Floyd's neck for nine minutes and 29 seconds. For part of the time, two other officers knelt on Floyd's back. During the final two minutes, Floyd was motionless and had no pulse.

A reading of the initial police report shows no mention of Floyd's treatment when he was arrested. The misleading report reads, a "medical incident during police interaction." Many believe Chauvin would never have been convicted if the mobile phone video taken by Darnella Frazier had not surfaced. Minnesota Governor Tim Walz publicly thanked Frazier saying, "Taking that video, I think many folks know, is maybe the only reason that Derek Chauvin will go to prison".

Two autopsies found Floyd's death to be a homicide. At the time of his murder, Floyd also had recovered from COVID-19 and suffered from heart disease, and had fentanyl and methamphetamine in his system.

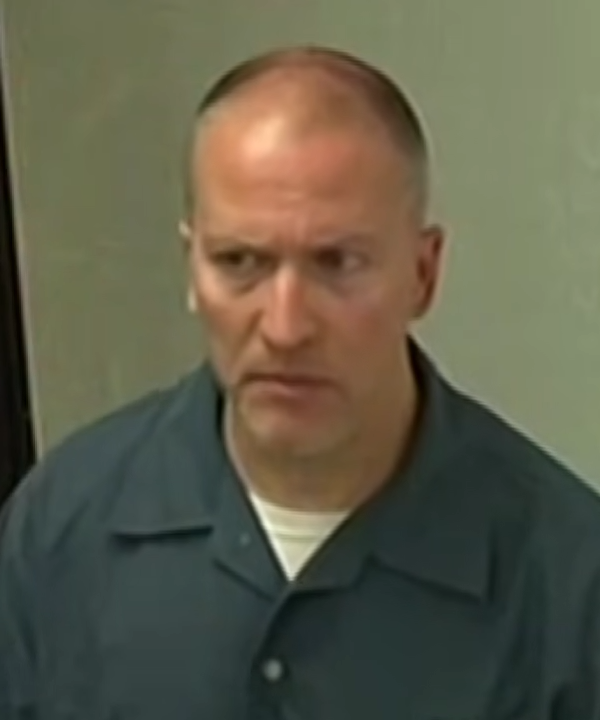
Chauvin in 2023

=== Arrest, charges, and bail ===
May 29, 2020, initial criminal complaint against Chauvin

Chauvin was arrested on May 29, 2020, and initially charged with third-degree murder and second-degree manslaughter, making him the first white police officer in Minnesota to be charged with murdering a black civilian. On June 3, charges were amended to include second-degree murder, specifically unintentional second-degree murder while attempting to commit felony assault. Chauvin was released on conditional bail on October 7, 2020 after posting a bond of $1 million. Court documentation provided that his release was supervised and would be forfeited if he declined to appear before a magistrate, refused to appear in court on scheduled dates, left the state of Minnesota without court approval, or had contact with Floyd's family.

=== Pre-trial proceedings ===
On August 29, 2020, Chauvin's attorneys filed a motion to dismiss the case, claiming that Floyd most likely died as a result of drug use and preexisting medical conditions. On the same day, prosecutors moved to increase potential sentences for the four officers beyond the guidelines for all four accused, arguing that Floyd was vulnerable while being held down on the ground in handcuffs and was treated cruelly.

On November 12, 2020, Judge Cahill initially ruled that Chauvin and the other three officers would be tried together. On January 11, 2021, Cahill ruled that Chauvin would be tried separately from the other officers.

On October 22, 2020, Cahill dismissed the third-degree murder charge, but not the second-degree unintentional murder and second-degree manslaughter charges. On March 11, 2021, on appeal, Cahill reinstated the third-degree murder charge against Chauvin. The decision came after the Minnesota Supreme Court on March 10, denied the defense's petition for review of a Court of Appeals decision requiring Cahill to reconsider reinstating the charge.

On March 19, 2021, after considering that drugs discovered in the SUV where Floyd was detained were confirmed to contain his DNA, Cahill allowed the defense to present limited evidence from Floyd's May 2019 arrest (when he resisted officers and swallowed drugs, leading to dangerously high blood pressure), disallowed a forensic psychiatrist the prosecution wanted to testify that Floyd was acting like a normal scared person during the arrests, and dismissed a motion to postpone the trial in light of the civil settlement's publicity.

== Trial ==
=== Judge and attorneys ===
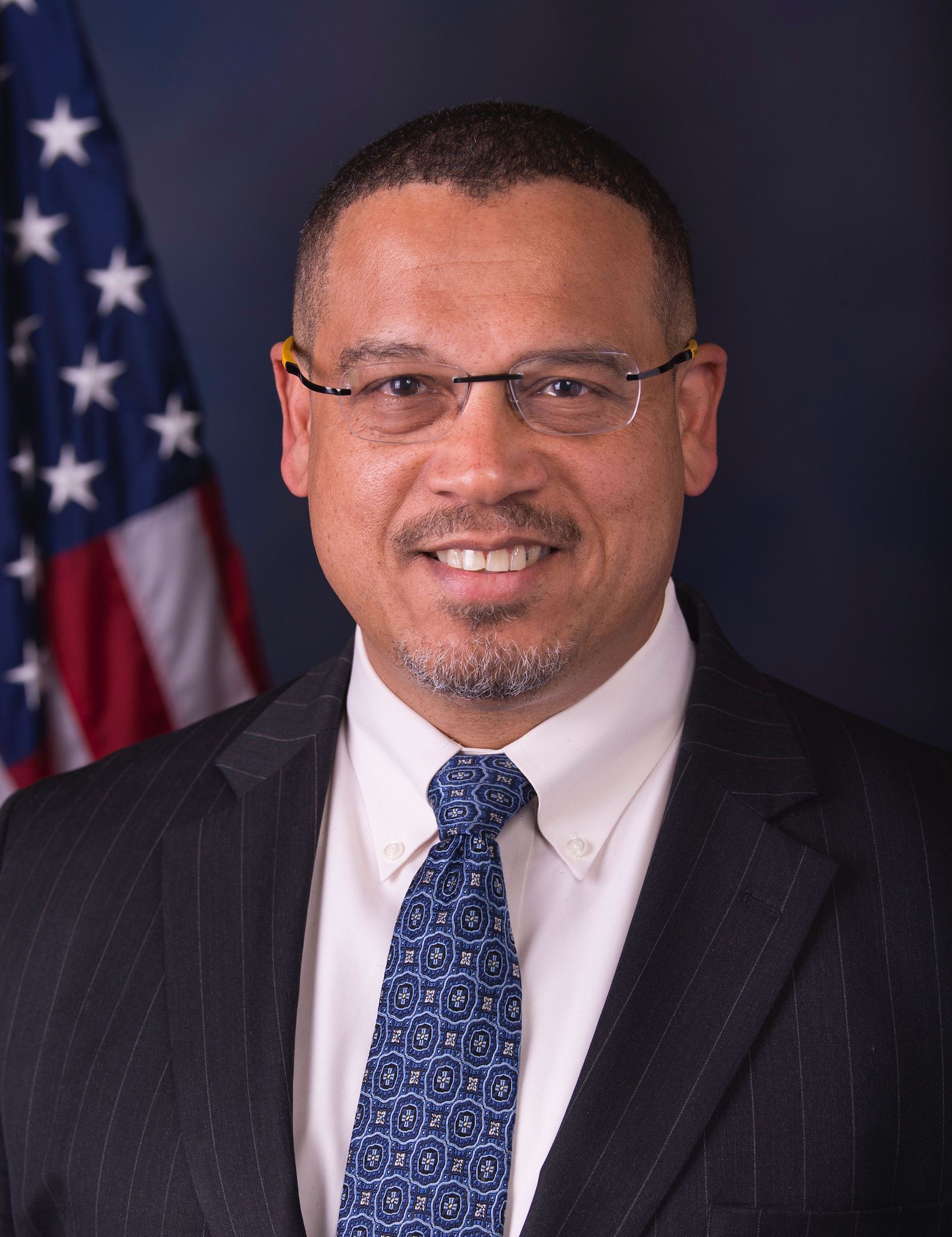
Attorney General Keith Ellison

Hennepin County Judge Peter Cahill presided over the case. Cahill has been a judge since 2007 and previously worked as both a public defender and prosecutor.

On May 31, 2020, Governor Tim Walz announced that Attorney General Keith Ellison would lead the prosecution instead of County Attorney Michael O. Freeman. Freeman was the subject of protests and was later disqualified from working on the case. Ellison was usually present in the courtroom but did not take part in making legal arguments.

The prosecution team included Minnesota Assistant Attorney General Matthew Frank, serving as the lead prosecutor, Jerry W. Blackwell, Steven Schleicher, and Erin Eldridge. Ellison brought in a team of attorneys from Hogan Lovells after Georgetown Law School Professor Neal Katyal, a former acting Solicitor General of the United States, offered to assist in crafting strategy and motions. Katyal said that Ellison invited the mother of Eric Garner to the prosecution's daily meeting and that her presence highlighted how the Chauvin case was also an effort "to achieve a measure of justice for all the Black families who have lost loved ones to police violence but never saw a courtroom." Blackwell, a civil rights and corporate torts attorney, joined the prosecution team pro bono. He is known for his ability to present complex legal issues in plain English to jurors. Chauvin was represented by defense attorney Eric Nelson, compensated by the Minneapolis Police and Peace Officers Association, which provides services to its members. Nelson is one of a dozen lawyers assigned in rotation for current and former members requiring job-related legal services.

=== Jury ===
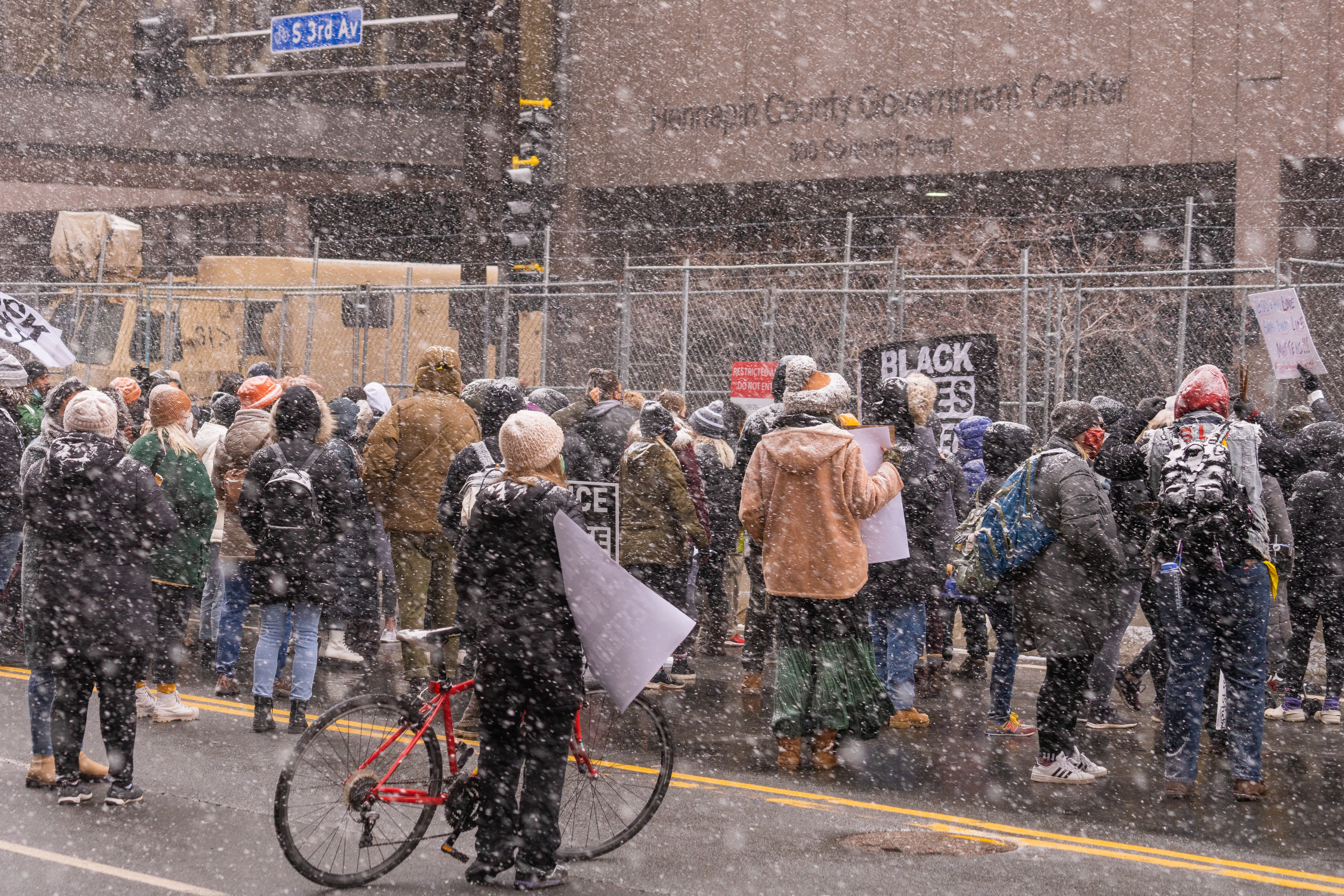
Protesters holding Black Lives Matter signs outside the court building, March 15, 2021

On December 22, 2020, prospective jurors in Hennepin County were mailed a questionnaire asking about their views on the criminal justice system, the police, and social movements. The questionnaire also asked prospective jurors to disclose how many times they viewed videos of Floyd's murder and whether they participated in the George Floyd protests.

The trial was held at the Hennepin County Government Center in Minneapolis. On March 8, 2021, jury selection was delayed until at least March 9, pending consideration of the third-degree murder charge against Chauvin. Jury selection began on that day, with the third-degree murder issue still unresolved by the Court of Appeals. During jury selection, prospective jurors were questioned about their views on Black Lives Matter, Blue Lives Matter, and defunding the police. Jurors were also questioned about Minneapolis' $27 million settlement with Floyd's family, with two seated jurors excused after news of the settlement changed their ability to be impartial. Some potential jurors expressed fear of retribution if they were to return an unpopular verdict. Twelve anonymous jurors and three alternates were seated as of March 23, with six white, four black, and two multi-racial jurors selected. On the third day of trial, a juror had a "stress-related reaction" but declined medical attention.

=== Opening statements ===
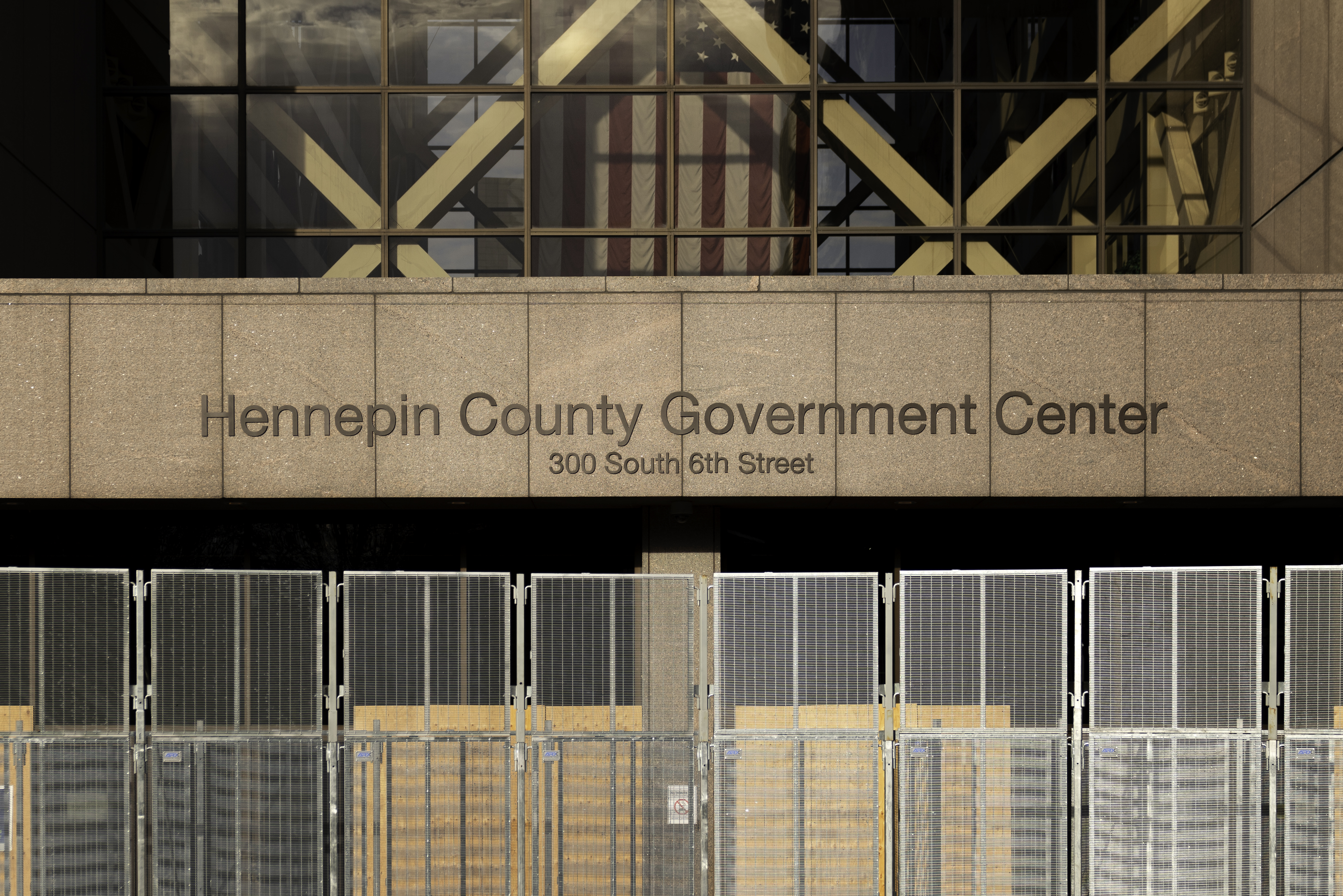
Fencing erected around the Hennepin County Government Center in preparation for the trial

Opening statements from the prosecution and the defense were heard on March 29, 2021. Prosecutor Jerry Blackwell started opening statements saying that "Mr. Chauvin betrayed his badge" while defense attorney Eric Nelson said that "Chauvin did exactly what he had been trained to do". Nelson's opening statement drew attention to the eyewitnesses who watched Floyd's death, who he characterized as an unruly and threatening crowd.

=== Prosecution case ===
The prosecution began its case on March 29, 2021, and rested on April 13 after 11 days of testimony from 38 witnesses.

==== Prosecution witnesses ====
About 400 people were included on a list of prospective trial witnesses, but only 38 were called on to testify. The prosecution's witnesses were:

- Jena Scurry, a 911 dispatcher who received the call about Floyd using a counterfeit bill; she viewed Floyd's arrest via live video, and was concerned about the manner of his arrest, leading her to call a police sergeant about the arrest.
- Alisha Oyler, a bystander who filmed Floyd's murder.
- Donald Williams II, a bystander and professional MMA fighter, who testified that Chauvin's kneeling on Floyd's neck was applying a "blood choke", that Chauvin was "shimmying to actually get the final choke in" on Floyd, that the arrest procedure was "torture", and that he called 911 on Chauvin because he believed he had "witnessed a murder".
- Darnella Frazier and three other underage witnesses who witnessed Floyd's murder testified off-camera. Frazier is the witness who recorded the widely circulated video that challenged the initial police report. She testified that Floyd was "terrified, scared, begging for his life", and saying "I can't breathe", while Chauvin "just stared at us" with "this cold look".
- Genevieve Hansen, a bystander and EMT-certified firefighter of the Minneapolis Fire Department (MFD), who witnessed Floyd's condition and wanted to treat him but was not allowed. Hansen said she saw that Floyd "had an altered state of consciousness", because he was not responding to the "painful stimuli" of Chauvin's knee on his neck. She wanted to check Floyd for consciousness, start chest compressions, as well as render other medical attention, but was denied access to Floyd by the police.
- Christopher Martin, an employee at Cup Foods who allegedly received the counterfeit bill from Floyd. Martin said "it would appear that [Floyd] was high" but that he was able to talk and communicate.
- Christopher Belfrey, a bystander parked behind Floyd's SUV who began recording a video after seeing officer Lane point a gun at Floyd.
- Charles McMillian, a bystander who had a conversation with Floyd when Floyd was in the police car.
- Lt. Jeff Rugel, head of the MPD's business technology unit, who was familiar with police body camera footage.
- Courteney Ross, Floyd's girlfriend, who testified that Floyd struggled with an opioid addiction after using opioids to treat back pain, that he had once been hospitalized for an overdose, and that he was in the car with a supplier at the time of his arrest. She cried while describing her relationship with Floyd.
- Seth Bravinder and Derek Smith, Hennepin paramedics who responded to the scene of Floyd's murder and testified that they saw no signs of breathing or movement by Floyd when they arrived, that they detected no heartbeat once they were allowed access to Floyd, and that they failed to resuscitate Floyd. Smith said that when they arrived, he believed Floyd was already dead.
- Capt. Jeremy Norton of the MFD, who responded to the scene and reported what happened to his supervisors. Norton said he "was worried that a man had been killed in police custody".
- Ret. Sgt. David Pleoger, a police supervisor. 911 dispatcher Scurry called him to report her concern about the arrest. Pleoger arrived at the scene after Floyd was taken away in an ambulance. Pleoger testified that the arresting officers "could have ended their restraint" of Floyd once he stopped resisting them while handcuffed on the ground.
- Sgt. Jon Edwards of the MPD, who testified that he responded to the crime scene, told Lane and Kueng to turn on their body cameras, and attempted to interview witnesses.
- Lt. Richard Zimmerman, an MPD homicide investigator and its most senior officer. Zimmerman testified that Chauvin's kneeling on Floyd's neck for an extended period of time was "totally unnecessary" and that such a move "can kill". Zimmerman further testified that once suspects are handcuffed, "the threat level goes down all the way", and the police "need to get them out of the prone position as soon as possible because it restricts their breathing".
- Bradford Wankhede Langenfeld, the Emergency Medicine resident physician at Hennepin County Medical Center who pronounced Floyd dead. He testified that for any person whose heart had stopped (like Floyd), the chance of survival decreases by 10%–15% every minute that cardiopulmonary resuscitation (CPR) is not attempted.
- Medaria Arradondo, chief of the MPD. Arradondo testified that Chauvin violated department policy, training and ethics by continuing to restrain Floyd in that manner at various stages: when Floyd had ceased resisting, was "no longer responsive", and was "motionless". Alongside citing the "sanctity of life" and the "duty of care", Arradondo added that Chauvin had violated department policy by not deescalating the situation when possible, and by not providing immediate medical attention to Floyd.
- Inspector Katie Blackwell, who was the commander of the MPD's training division at the time of Floyd's murder. Blackwell testified that MPD policy was to train officers to use their arms to carry out a neck restraint on a suspect, instead of using an officer's knee like Chauvin did. She also testified that during the entirety of Chauvin's tenure with the department, MPD officers "were taught about positional asphyxia", and hence instructed to move suspects onto their sides "as soon as possible" once they are "under control".
- Sgt. Ker Yang, an MPD crisis trainer who explained that listening is key to crisis intervention and that officers "shall de-escalate" when "it is safe and feasible".
- Lt. Johnny Mercil, the state's expert on MPD use-of-force policy and training, testified that officers are trained to use the least amount of force to get control of a suspect and to de-escalate their restraint once the suspect is under control. He also said kneeling on Floyd's neck violated police policy, ethics, and training.
- Officer Nicole Mackenzie, medical support coordinator, is the state's MPD expert on medical issues. Defense attorney Nelson questioned her about agonal breathing which she explained as ineffective irregular gasps for air. Nelson questioned as to whether it can be confused with effective breathing during "certain circumstances where there's a lot of noise, or a lot of commotion". She replied in the affirmative but under further questioning by the prosecution when asked if a hostile crowd could excuse an officer from giving emergency medical aid Mackenzie replied, yes but only "if an officer was being physically assaulted". She also testified that even if a person can speak it does not suggest that they are breathing adequately.
- Sergeant Jody Stiger of the Los Angeles Police Department, a national expert on use-of-force by police. Stiger testified that the video showed Chauvin not changing the force he applied to Floyd's neck area during the restraint. According to Stiger, "no force was reasonable in that position" where Floyd was prone and handcuffed. In that position, Floyd was "not attempting to resist, not attempting to assault officers, kick, punch", opined Stiger. The pressure exerted by Chauvin's body weight in that position may "cause positional asphyxia and could cause death", said Stiger. Stiger testified that Chauvin executed a pain compliance technique on Floyd's wrist and knuckles, even though Floyd was prone, not resisting, and apparently unable to comply; this technique was applied for an excessive period of time. Although Stiger said that a name-calling crowd could be viewed as "a potential threat", Stiger also testified that for the bystanders to Floyd's arrest: "I did not perceive them as being a threat", as most of their verbal remarks were due to "concern" for Floyd. While Stiger agreed with defense attorney Nelson's assertion that police were trained to place a knee between the shoulder blades of suspects, Stiger disagreed with Nelson's assertion that Chauvin had placed his knee "on" Floyd's shoulder blades, rather than "above" them.
- Special Agent James Reyerson of the Minnesota Bureau of Criminal Apprehension (BCA) testified that he interviewed Minneapolis Chief Arradondoas during the investigation into Floyd's murder.
- McKenzie Anderson, a BCA forensic scientist who processed Floyd's SUV and the officers' squad car and tested eight stains positive for Floyd's DNA, including seven blood stains.
- Breahna Giles, a BCA chemical forensic scientist who testified that pills found inside Floyd's SUV contained fentanyl and methamphetamine.
- Susan Neith, a forensic chemist who testified that three pills found inside the SUV and squad car contained a fentanyl concentration of less than 1% and a methamphetamine concentration of 1.9 to 2.9%, whereas "the majority of time" Neith sees "90 to 100% methamphetamine".
- Martin J. Tobin, pulmonologist, critical care specialist, physiologist, and recognized expert in respiratory failure who said lack of oxygen to the brain and heart led to Floyd's death. Tobin testified that Floyd died of low levels of oxygen caused by asphyxiation that resulted in brain damage and cardiac arrest, and that he did not die of a fentanyl overdose.
- Daniel Isenschmid, a forensic toxicologist who testified that the ratio of fentanyl to norfentanyl in Floyd's blood was 1.96 ng/ml, below the average of 9.05 in postmortem cases and 3.2 in DUI cases, adding that overdose victims rarely have norfentanyl in their blood. He also testified that Floyd's level of methamphetamine was in the bottom 5.9% of a sample of DUI methamphetamine cases.
- Bill Smock, a legal forensic medicine specialist, surgeon, and former emergency room doctor who testified that Floyd died from a lack of oxygen and not a fentanyl overdose.
- Lindsey Thomas, a forensic pathologist. She testified that there was "no evidence" that indicated that Floyd "would have died that night except for the interactions with law enforcement". Thomas said that the many videos of Floyd's arrest did not show signs of a death from a fentanyl overdose, as those deaths typically feature a person becoming "very sleepy" and then "peacefully stops breathing"; the videos also did not show Floyd experiencing a sudden death, as from a heart attack.
- Andrew Baker, the chief Hennepin County medical examiner, who performed the official autopsy on Floyd's body. He testified that he stood by his autopsy finding that Floyd's death was a homicide caused by "cardiopulmonary arrest complicating law enforcement subdual, restraint and neck compression". He said Floyd's heart disease, fentanyl intoxication and methamphetamine use were contributing causes but not direct causes because they "did not cause the subdual or the neck restraint". He said he did not believe the neck compression he saw in the videos (which left no signs of injury) could have restricted air or blood flow to Floyd's brain, but that it contributed to physiological stress, increased adrenaline, and elevated blood pressure.
- Jonathan Rich, a medical expert in cardiology, testified that despite seeing coronary artery blockage in Floyd's heart the heart is able to create new paths for blood to circulate and he saw nothing to suggest that a cardiac event played a role in his death. He also testified that he saw no evidence to suggest that a drug overdose caused Floyd's death.
- Philonise Floyd, younger brother of George Floyd, who recalled the close relationship between his brother and their mother.
- The final witness, Seth Stoughton, a law professor and former police officer, spoke as a use-of-force expert. Using the "reasonable officer" standard he testified that Chauvin's level of force was disproportionate to the circumstances. "No reasonable officer would have believed that this was an appropriate, acceptable or reasonable use of force."

==== Body camera and surveillance footage ====
External videos
- Raw police bodycam footage beginning approximately 8:09 p.m. on YouTube (1 hr 5 mins)

Body camera footage from the four officers involved was entered into evidence and shown at trial. Shortly after Floyd was taken away in an ambulance Chauvin's body camera shows him responding to a bystander who took issue with his kneeling on Floyd's neck. Chauvin responded to the bystander saying, "That's one person's opinion, we had to control this guy because he's a sizable guy. It looks like he's probably on something." Prosecutors also showed surveillance footage of Floyd at Cup Foods shortly before his murder.

==== Rebuttal witness ====
In a rebuttal to the defense's case on April 15, the prosecution called on Martin Tobin to testify again. Tobin, an expert in respiratory failure, disagreed with defense witness Fowler's contention that carbon monoxide from the squad car may have played a role in Floyd's death. Tobin testified that autopsy results showed Floyd's blood had an oxygen saturation level of 98%, meaning "all there was for anything else was 2%" and humans normally have a blood level of 0 to 3% carbon monoxide at any given time.

=== Defense case ===
The defense began its case on April 13, 2021, and rested on April 15 after two days of testimony from seven witnesses.

==== Defense witnesses ====
Chauvin decided not to testify in his own defense, exercising his Fifth Amendment right. The defense's witnesses were:

- Scott Creighton, a retired MPD officer who testified about a May 2019 traffic stop of Floyd during which he pointed his gun at Floyd because Floyd was "unresponsive" to commands to show his hands, adding that Floyd's "behavior was very nervous, anxious" during the previous incident.
- Michelle Moseng, a retired Hennepin EMS paramedic who assisted Floyd after his May 2019 arrest and testified about Floyd's high blood pressure, risk of stroke, and use of Percocets.
- Shawanda Hill, a passenger of Floyd's SUV who testified that Floyd was asleep after leaving Cup Foods, woke up briefly after Cup Foods employees approached, and woke up again after she tried to rouse him and told him "the police is here".
- Peter Chang, a Minneapolis Park police officer who responded to the scene and testified that bystanders were "very aggressive toward the officers".
- Nicole Mackenzie, an MPD medical support coordinator who was also called as a prosecution witness and was questioned about MPD training on the topic of excited delirium.
- Barry Brodd, a former police officer and expert on self-defense defended Chauvin's actions. Brodd said that Chauvin was acting with objective reasonableness and was justified when he put Floyd handcuffed in a prone position. He said that the action did not qualify as force because no pain was inflicted and that Chauvin was following Minneapolis Police Department policy and current standards of law enforcement.
- David Fowler, a retired forensic pathologist said that the manner of Floyd's death should be classified as "undetermined" rather than "homicide". He testified, "In my opinion, Mr. Floyd had a sudden cardiac arrhythmia ... due to his atherosclerotic and hypertensive heart disease ... during his restraint and subdual by the police." In his determination both the drugs fentanyl and methamphetamine contributed to Floyd's death and exposure to vehicle exhaust could have potentially contributed by causing increased carbon monoxide in his bloodstream or even carbon monoxide poisoning.

Fowler's evidence in Chauvin's trial was reminiscent of the cause of death given in the case of 19-year-old college student Anton Black, a black teenager who died in 2018 after being restrained and pinned to the ground by three white police officers. A medical report Fowler signed said the teenager's death was because of his heart issues and that it was an accident. Fowler is facing a lawsuit by Black's family, which accuses him of concealing evidence and protecting the officers. The ACLU accused Fowler of "creating false narratives about what kills Black people in police encounters". In 2025, the Maryland state government announced that an independent audit of Fowler's determinations of the manner of death during his time as Maryland's Chief Medical Examiner found that dozens of deaths in police custody should have been classified as homicides, and suggested a pattern of racial disparity.

==== Footage of Floyd's previous arrest ====
The New York Times reported that while trial judge Cahill tried to strictly limit Floyd's past acts and state of mind saying they were not relevant to the case, defense attorney Nelson was allowed to open Chauvin's defense with a video of a May 2019 arrest of Floyd related to previous drug use suggesting that it showed "a pattern of behavior in which Mr. Floyd responded to the police by panicking, implying that he faked his response". Nelson had previously said in court, "[Floyd's response] goes to the very nature of this case and why public perception is what it is; the things that he is saying. 'I can't breathe.' 'I'm claustrophobic.' Calling out for his Mama."

=== Closing arguments ===
Closing arguments were made on April 19, 2021, after Cahill announced on April 15 that the "evidence is now complete for this case" and instructed the jury. For the prosecution, Schleicher opened his statements saying "His name was George Perry Floyd Jr.", adding later that Chauvin's behavior "wasn't policing, this was murder". For the defense, Nelson said that a "reasonable police officer would understand this situation", arguing that "Floyd was able to overcome the efforts of three police officers while handcuffed". For the state's rebuttal, Blackwell said that "reasonable is as reasonable does", asking jurors to "believe your eyes". After the arguments Cahill read the final jury instructions, and the jury retired to deliberate.

=== Verdict ===
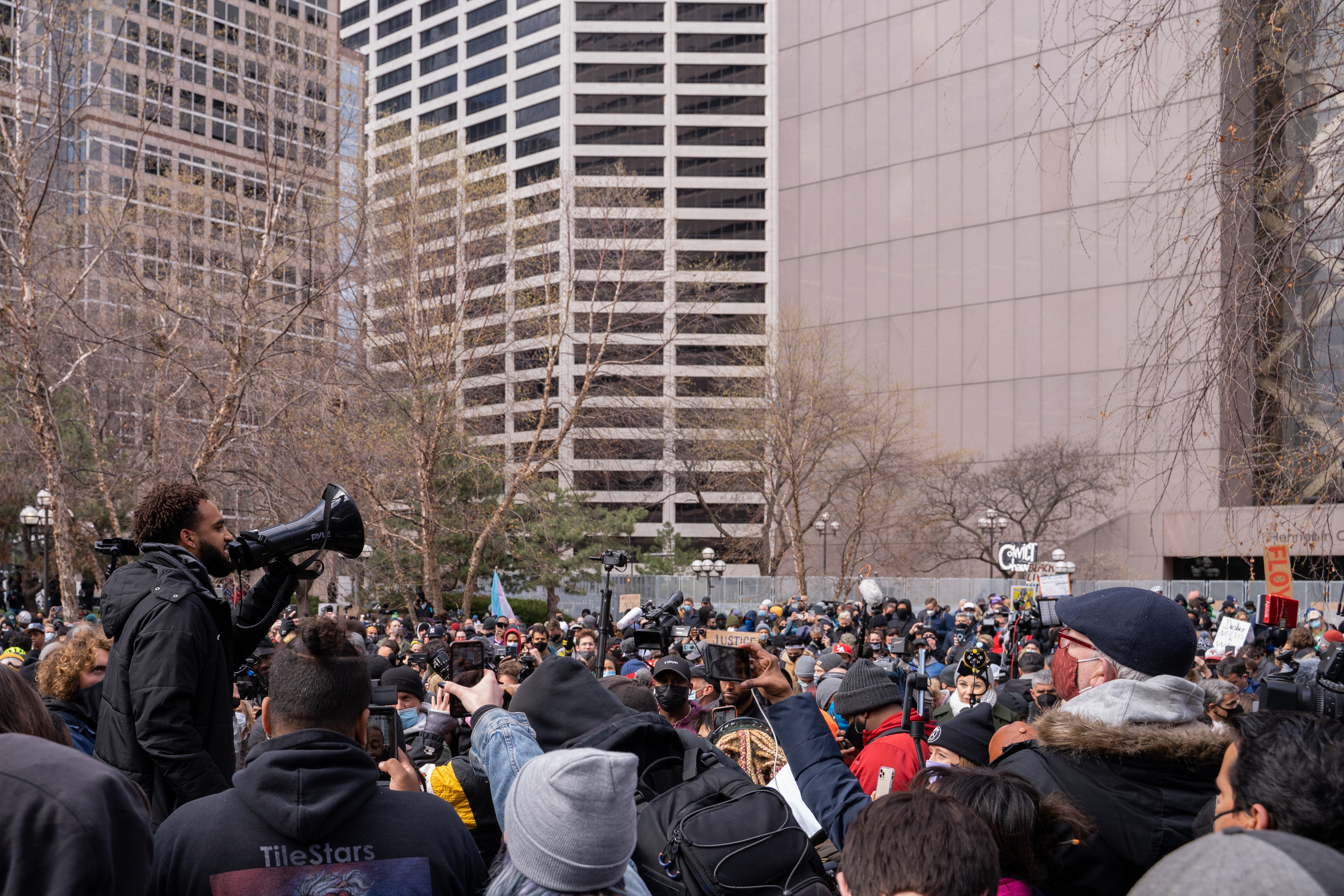
Crowd gathers in Minneapolis for the verdict announcement in the trial of Derek Chauvin, April 20, 2021

Jury deliberation began on April 19, 2021, following closing arguments. On April 20, the jury announced it had reached a verdict after ten hours of deliberation. Chauvin was found guilty on all three counts, becoming the first white Minnesota police officer to be convicted of murdering a black person. It was only the second time an officer has been convicted of murder in Minnesota, the first being the third-degree murder conviction of Somali-American officer Mohamed Noor in the killing of Justine Damond, a white woman. According to Nielsen ratings, approximately 18 million viewers across six networks watched the live reading of the verdict.

After the verdict was read, Chauvin's bail was revoked and he was remanded to the custody of the Hennepin County Sheriff's Office, which transferred Chauvin to the Minnesota Department of Corrections. Chauvin was then booked into the Oak Park Heights maximum-security state prison and held in solitary confinement for 23 hours a day.

=== Motion for new trial ===
Concerns surrounding juror partiality arose following the release of an image of a juror, Brandon Mitchell, wearing a "BLM" hat and wearing a t-shirt stating "Get your knee off our necks" while participating in a march in Washington, D.C. honoring Martin Luther King Jr.'s "I have a dream" speech.

Chauvin's new trial motion was denied by Judge Cahill hours before his June 25 sentencing. Judge Cahill ruled the night before that Chauvin "failed to demonstrate ... the Court abused its discretion or committed error such that Defendant was deprived of his constitutional right to a fair trial" and failed to demonstrate prosecutorial or juror misconduct.

=== Sentencing ===
Chauvin faced a maximum of 40 years in prison, but Minnesota sentencing guidelines suggested a sentence of 12.5 years as Chauvin was a first-time offender with no prior criminal history. The state stated that it would ask for a longer sentence than the guidelines recommend due to aggravating factors, including that the murder happened in the presence of children; that Floyd was treated with "particular cruelty" by Chauvin; and that Chauvin, as a police officer, "abused his position of authority". On May 12, Judge Cahill allowed for the prosecution to seek a greater prison sentence after finding that Chauvin treated Floyd "with particular cruelty." Prosecutors requested a 30-year prison sentence, which was "twice the upper end of the presumptive sentencing range" and "would properly account for the profound impact of Defendant's conduct on the victim, the victim's family, and the community," according to a sentencing memo. Chauvin's attorney Nelson argued that the former officer should instead receive probation and time served, writing in a filing that "Mr. Chauvin asks the Court to look beyond its findings, to his background, his lack of criminal history, his amenability to probation, to the unusual facts of this case, and to his being a product of a 'broken' system.

On June 25, 2021, a year and a month after Floyd's murder, Chauvin's sentencing hearing began. During their victim impact statements, members of Floyd's family expressed their emotional trauma suffered from Floyd's murder, and asked the Court for the maximum sentence. Chauvin's mother also delivered a statement on behalf of her family. In a statement, Chauvin expressed his condolences to the Floyd family, saying that "[t]here's going to be some other information in the future that would be of interest and I hope things will give you some peace of mind."

Judge Cahill sentenced Derek Chauvin to 22.5 years in prison on his second-degree murder charge. The second-degree manslaughter and third-degree murder charges were not adjudicated, as they are lesser included offenses. As with other people convicted of murder, Chauvin is prohibited from possessing any firearms, ammunition, or explosives.

== Reactions ==
=== Protests and demonstrations ===
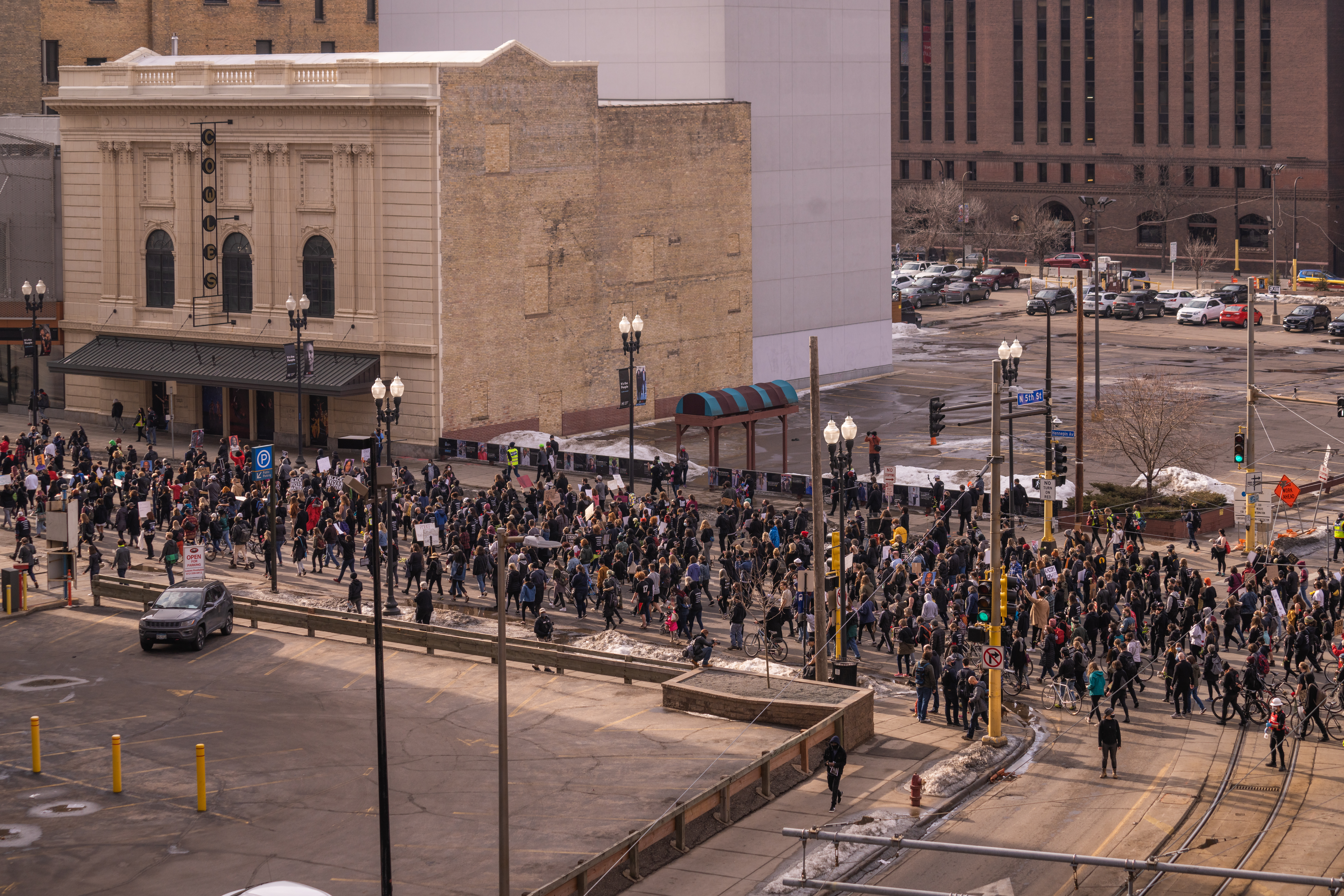
Protesters march in Minneapolis on March 7, 2021.

Protests, rallies, and marches occurred outside of the courthouse, which officials surrounded with a temporary concrete barrier, metal fencing, and barbed wire in anticipation of civil unrest. In early 2021, Minneapolis and Hennepin County officials spent $1 million on fencing and barricades for government buildings and police stations in anticipation of civil unrest during the trial. In February 2021, Governor Walz deployed the Minnesota National Guard for trial security and in the event of civil unrest, in response to requests from Minneapolis Mayor Jacob Frey and Saint Paul Mayor Melvin Carter.

On March 7, 2021, one day ahead of jury selection, several hundred protesters marched in downtown Minneapolis and rallied outside the courthouse to mourn Floyd's murder and to call for police reform. On March 8, about a thousand protesters gathered peacefully outside the courthouse to call for justice for Floyd and raise broader issues of racial injustice. On March 28, one day ahead of opening statements, several rallies and protests were held in Minneapolis, including a march in downtown Minneapolis to demand justice for Floyd and rallies at the courthouse and City Hall. Floyd's family and Al Sharpton hosted a vigil on March 28 at the Greater Friendship Missionary Baptist Church in Minneapolis.

During the trial, daily visitors from across the United States visited George Floyd Square. On April 6, 2021, Floyd's family held a prayer and press conference outside the courthouse with Sharpton, family attorney Benjamin Crump, and former New York Governor David Paterson. On April 13, after the killing of Daunte Wright, members of the Floyd and Wright families held a press conference outside the courthouse with Crump.

=== Government officials ===
President Joe Biden and Vice President Kamala Harris deliver remarks on the verdict at the White House.

On March 29, White House Press Secretary Jen Psaki said that President Joe Biden would "be watching [the trial] closely", would not weigh in while it is ongoing and was not in touch with Floyd's family ahead of it. U.S. Representative Cori Bush tweeted on March 29 that "Derek Chauvin is on trial" and "George Floyd is not on trial", adding on March 30 that Chauvin's defense attorney is "arguing that George Floyd does not deserve justice".

On April 19, California Representative Maxine Waters said if Chauvin was not found guilty of murder, members of the George Floyd protests "gotta stay on the street, we've got to get more active, we've got to get more confrontational, we've got to make sure that they know that we mean business". Judge Cahill called legislators' failure to refrain from commenting on court cases "abhorrent" and said Waters' comments may constitute grounds for the defense to appeal and overturn a potential guilty verdict.

While the sequestered jury was deliberating, Biden said he was praying for "the right verdict". He also contacted Floyd's family during this time. He remarked, "They're a good family and they're calling for peace and tranquility, no matter what the verdict is." After the verdict, Biden and Vice President Kamala Harris made statements to the press, with Biden calling it a "step forward". Harris said justice is not just a "people of color problem", but a problem for "every American". They both urged Congress to pass the George Floyd Justice in Policing Act, which Harris co-authored as Senator, to reform policing in America.

Following the verdict, Republican Senators Tim Scott of South Carolina and Mike Braun of Indiana made statements indicating support for the ruling. Scott said that he was "thankful for the verdict" and that "There is no question in [his] mind that the jury reached the right verdict", and Braun said that he had "hoped for" a guilty verdict. Democratic Representative Joyce Beatty of Ohio, chair of the Congressional Black Caucus, spoke in support of the George Floyd Justice in Policing Act. Former President Barack Obama and First Lady Michelle Obama said that "Minneapolis did the right thing".

=== Broadcast of the trial ===
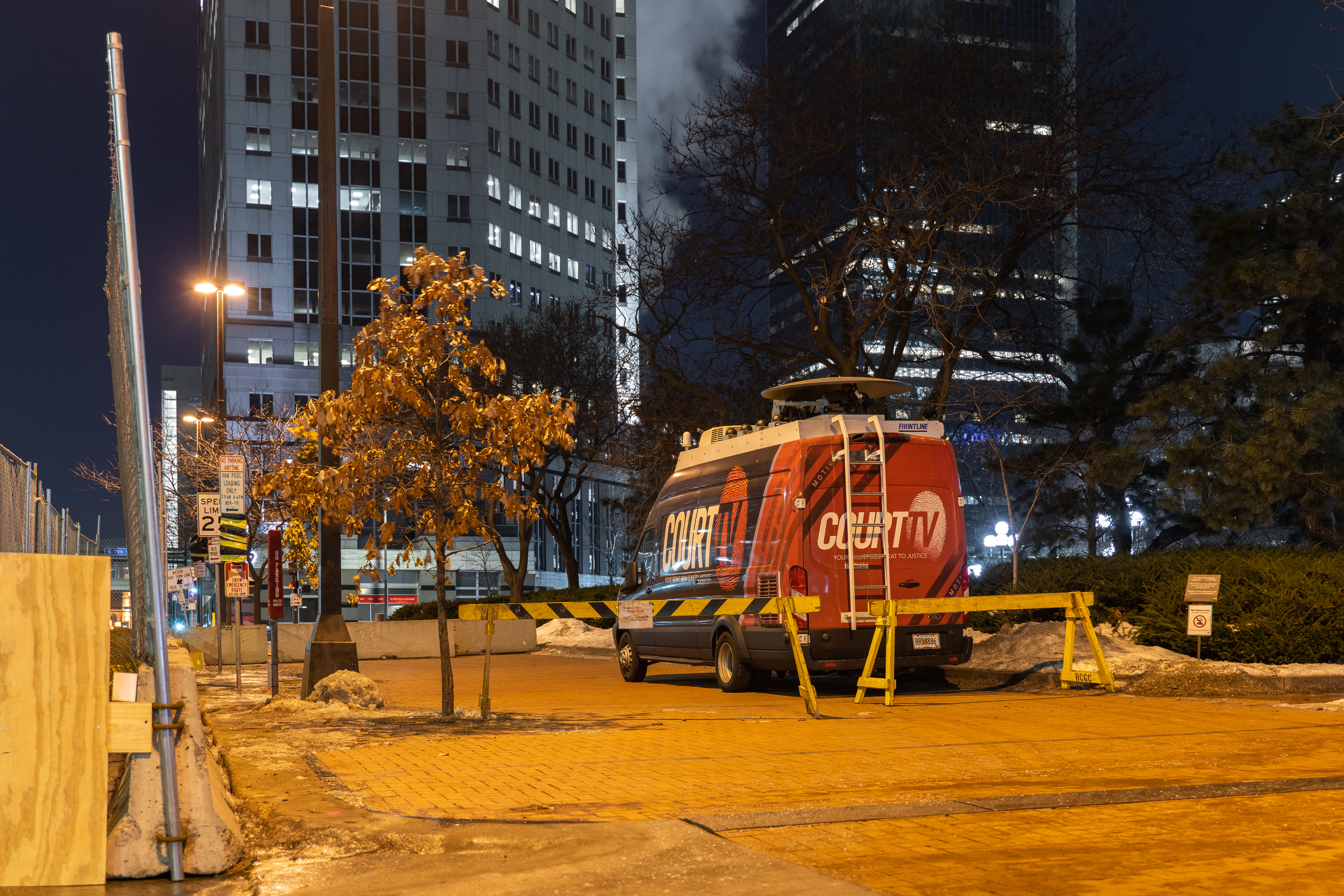
Court TV van outside the trial venue, February 25, 2021

It was the first criminal trial in Minnesota to be entirely televised and the first in state court to be broadcast live. Court TV televised the entire trial live. The New York Times reported strong public interest throughout the trial. CNN had more viewing during key portions of the trial than it did in prime time. All broadcast networks had a "huge viewership" and in the U.S. more than 23 million watched the reading of the verdict. It was also widely broadcast around the world with a large viewership and commentary. Minnesota trials are not generally televised. However, due to the ongoing COVID-19 pandemic Judge Cahill made the decision to televise the trial. Attorney General Ellison objected, fearing that it might intimidate the witnesses, but a coalition of the defense, news outlets, and, ultimately, Cahill disagreed.

=== Family, legal team, and supporters ===
Following Chauvin's conviction, Ellison, who served as the head of prosecution, held a televised press conference in which he thanked his prosecution team. Hennepin County District Attorney Mike Freeman and trial lawyers Steve Schleider, Jerry Blackwell and Matthew Frank were among those who spoke at Ellison's post-trial press conference.

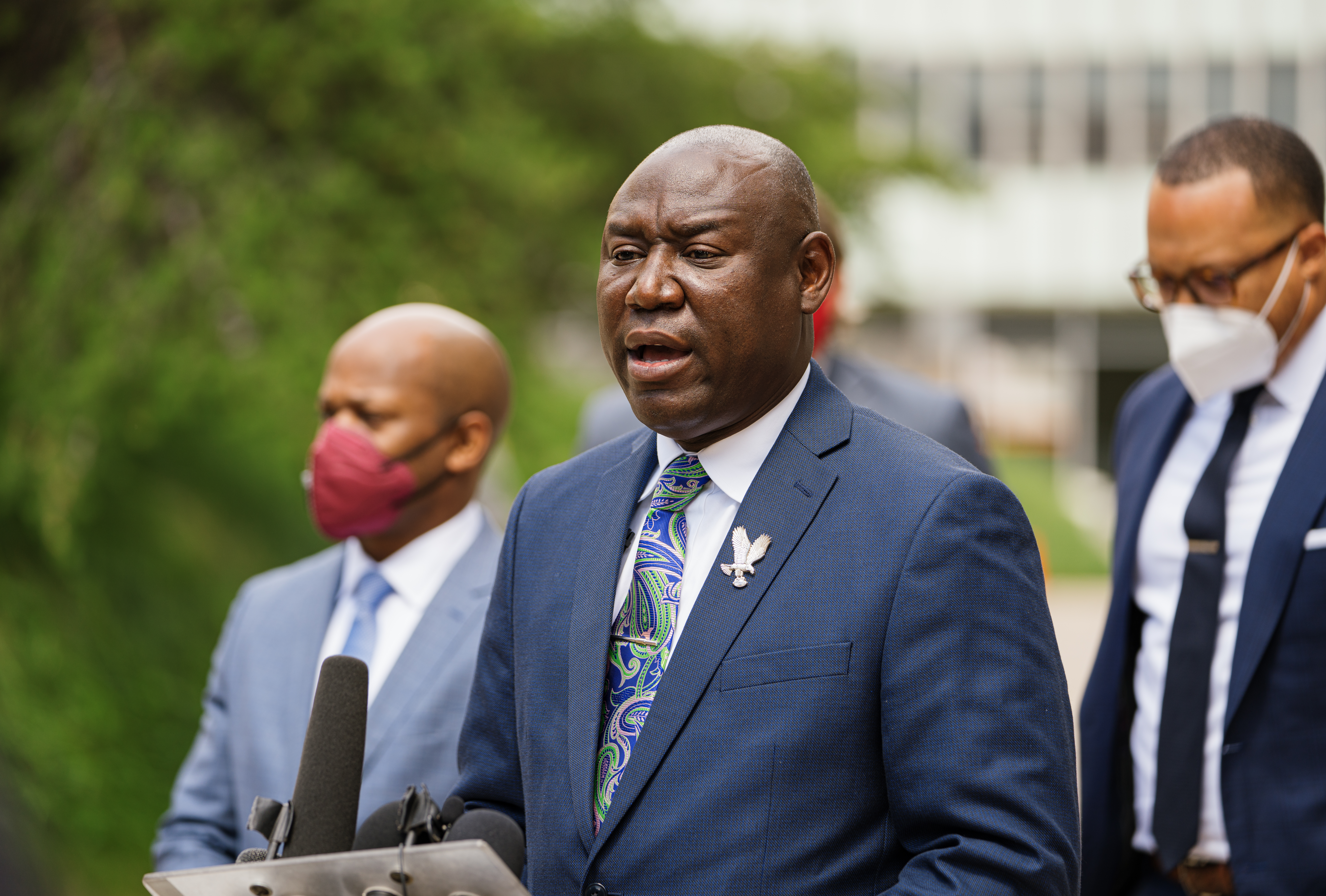
Floyd's family attorney, Benjamin Crump

Following the verdict, the Floyd family held a news conference which included members of the Floyd family, the legal team, and others. The family attorney Benjamin Crump issued a statement which read in part:

Painfully earned justice has arrived for George Floyd's family and the community here in Minneapolis, but today's verdict goes far beyond this city and has significant implications for the country and even the world. Justice for Black America is justice for all of America. This case is a turning point in American history for accountability of law enforcement and sends a clear message we hope is heard clearly in every city and every state.

Floyd had three brothers and one sister. At the news conference Philonise Floyd commented, "A lot of days I prayed and I hoped ... I said, 'I have faith that he will be convicted.'" He compared his brother's murder to that of Emmett Till, whose murder made him an icon of the civil rights movement. Another brother, Terrence Floyd, spoke saying, "I'm just grateful. I'm grateful that my grandmother, my mother, my aunt, they got to see this history made." Floyd's sister Bridgett said, "That's a very big step that they [the jury] took yesterday. But that's the right way to do things. That's the way things are supposed to be done. And it shouldn't have took an officer on a man's neck, my brother's neck, for nine minutes and 29 seconds for them to be convicted."

Rev. Al Sharpton was also in attendance. He spoke saying "We still have cases to fight, but this gives us the energy to fight on". NAACP president Derrick Johnson released a statement on the verdict. Johnson said in part, "While justice landed Derek Chauvin behind bars for murdering George Floyd, no amount of justice will bring Gianna's father back. The same way a reasonable police officer would never suffocate an unarmed man to death, a reasonable justice system would recognize its roots in white supremacy and end qualified immunity."

=== International ===
Canadian Prime Minister Justin Trudeau welcomed the verdict and said that Americans had seen "accountability for the murder of George Floyd", but warned about continuing alleged systemic racism in the United States. British Prime Minister Boris Johnson said he had been "appalled" by Floyd's murder and that his thoughts were with Floyd's family. London Mayor Sadiq Khan said that the verdict must be the "beginning of a real change, not the end", and sympathized with Floyd's family. Michelle Bachelet, United Nations Human Rights Chief, called the verdict "momentous".

=== Media coverage ===
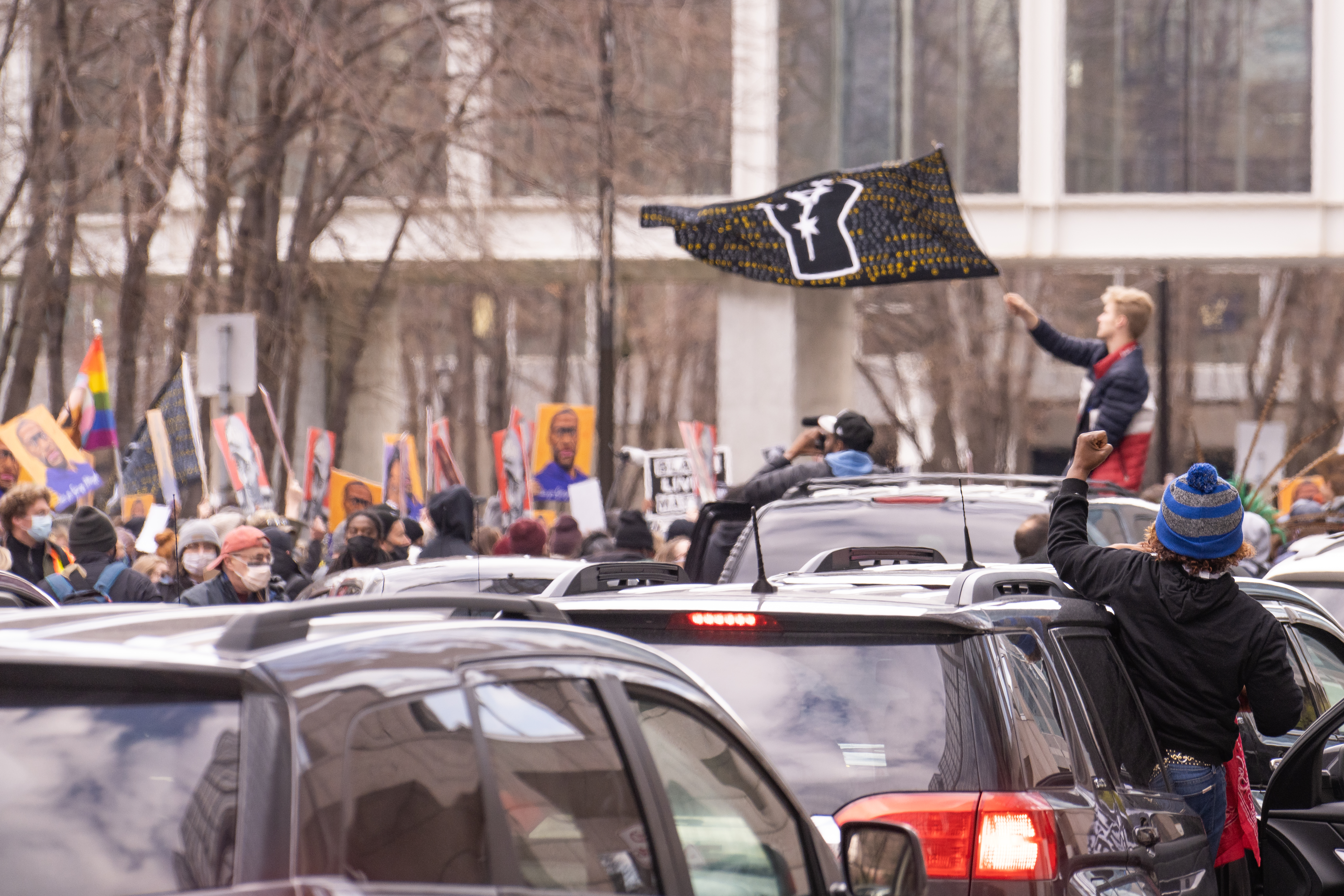
A crowd outside the court building in Minneapolis celebrates the guilty verdict, April 20, 2021

The Guardian reported that countries around the world showed an intense interest in the trial with news organizations live blogging the proceedings and the guilty outcome of the trial. They commented that many felt relief that the jury had delivered a verdict that many felt was correct, and questioned what it meant for future United States racial relations. The French newspaper Le Monde commented that Americans were relieved by the "historic verdict" and described the crowd gathered outside the courtroom as jubilant when the verdict was delivered. The Times of India expressed similar commentary: "Tears of joy, relief after conviction in Floyd murder case." In Spain, the ABC commented that the trial had "shaken the country for the past year and once again dragged the world's oldest and most stable democracy before the mirror of racial inequalities." In Sweden, the Svenska Dagbladet used the verdict to look forward, quoting President Joe Biden in its headline: "Joe Biden: The Floyd ruling is a big step forward." In Australia, The Sydney Morning Herald wrote that while "the moment is undoubtedly significant ... no one in the US, least of all African Americans, is naive enough to believe the verdict marks an end to racial inequality or police brutality in America." The English-language website of China's state-run Global Times said: "Former US police officer Derek Chauvin found guilty of murder and manslaughter in George Floyd's death."

The trial's verdict received backlash from right-wing and conservative media, which claimed that the verdict was "rigged" or influenced by "mob rule". Speaking on Steve Bannon's podcast War Room, former President Donald Trump's lawyer Rudy Giuliani suggested that the case "was subverted by the media, by Maxine Waters, and numerous other public officials." According to Giuliani, "there was no way in the world that the jury wasn't hearing that and paying attention to it." Bannon also included President Biden in the list of "outside officials". On April 20, 2021, American conservative commentator Tucker Carlson claimed on Fox News that the jurors who found Chauvin guilty were threatened into doing so by Black Lives Matter protests, rather than being swayed by witness testimony or visceral video of Floyd's murder. Carlson said: "Everyone understood perfectly well the consequences of an acquittal in this case. After nearly a year of burning and looting and murder by BLM, that was never in doubt."

=== Public opinion polling ===
A poll conducted by CBS News found that 75% of Americans believed that the jury reached the right verdict in the trial of Derek Chauvin. Among White Americans, 90% of Democrats polled believed the right verdict was reached while only 54% of Republicans found the guilty decision to be correct. 93% of Black Americans agreed with the decision. Polling showed that the 25% who believe that the jury did not reach the right decision also "strongly disagree[d]" with the beliefs of the Black Lives Matter movement. They largely identified as conservative and were disproportionately White. President Joe Biden had a 60% approval rating for his handling of matters surrounding Floyd's murder and Chauvin's trial, similar to his overall job rating of his first 100 days in office.

== Appeal ==
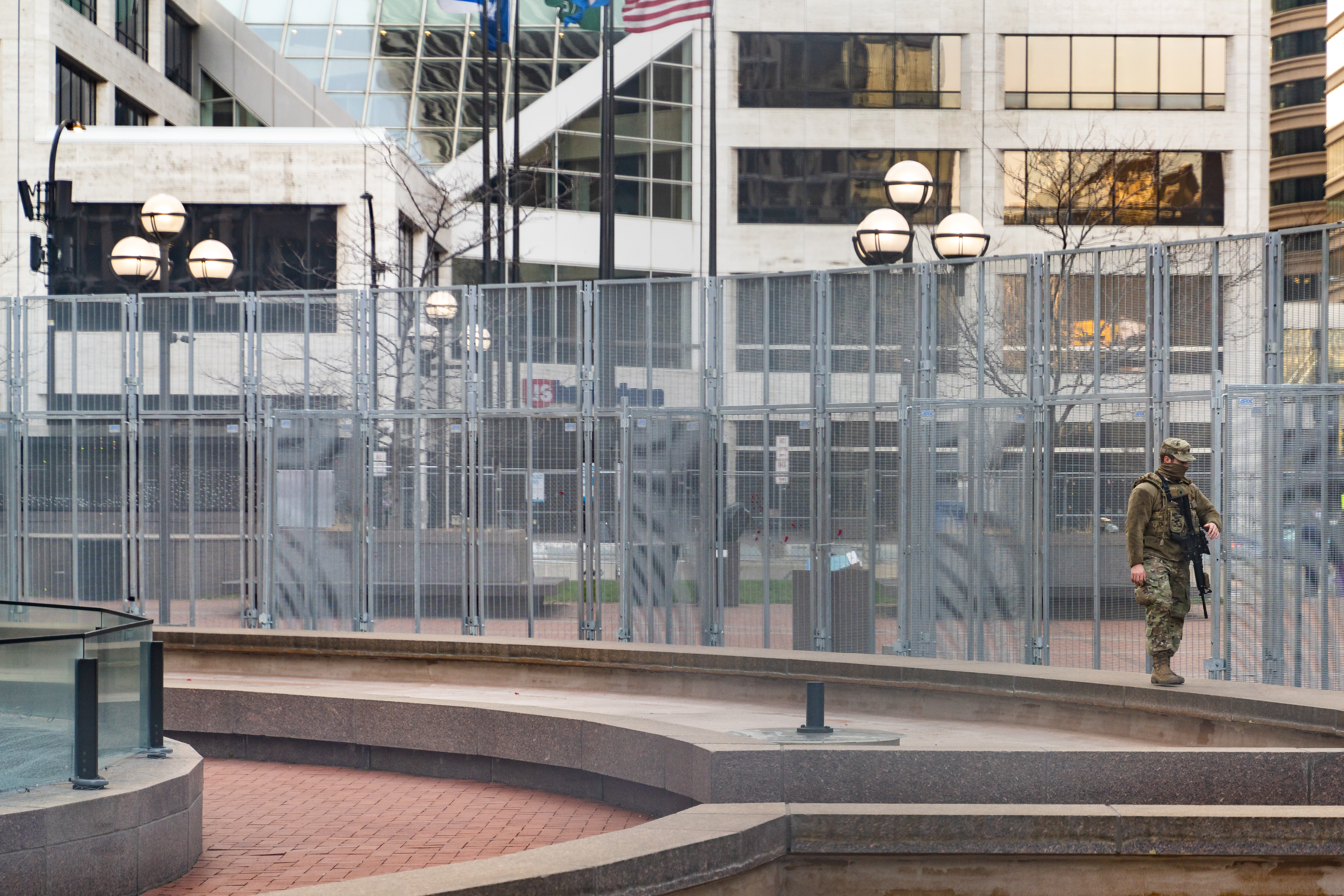
A Minnesota National Guard trooper and security fencing at Hennepin County Government Center during the criminal trial, April 2, 2021

Chauvin appealed his conviction to the Minnesota Court of Appeals in mid 2022, asserting that errors in the trial court denied him a fair trial. The case was argued to a three-judge panel on January 18, 2023. Chauvin's attorneys sought a new trial outside the Hennepin County Government Center, which had been surrounded by security fencing and National Guard troops in preparation for potential civil unrest. His attorneys argued that the pre-trial publicity made a fair trial impossible and that the only remedy would be to hold new trial at a different venue. These arguments were rejected by a three-judge panel of the Minnesota Court of Appeals in an opinion released on April 17, 2023. In affirming the conviction the judges said that Chauvin's use of force on Floyd was excessive and unlawful, and that the criminal trial was conducted fairly. Chauvin then sought review by the Minnesota Supreme Court. In an order issued on July 19, 2023, the court denied Chauvin's petition for further review—which means that the Court of Appeals' ruling is final. After exhausting his appeals in state court, Chauvin's attorneys filed a petition asking the Supreme Court of the United States to review the case, but the petition to review the case was rejected on November 20, 2023.
