= Paul A. Magnuson =

American judge (born 1937)

Senior Judge of the United States District Court for the District of Minnesota
- Incumbent
- Assumed office February 9, 2002

Chief Judge of the United States District Court for the District of Minnesota
- In office 1994–2001
- Preceded by: Diana E. Murphy
- Succeeded by: James M. Rosenbaum

Judge of the United States District Court for the District of Minnesota
- In office October 29, 1981 – February 9, 2002
- Appointed by: Ronald Reagan
- Preceded by: Edward Devitt
- Succeeded by: Joan N. Ericksen

Personal details
- Born: Paul Arthur Magnuson; February 9, 1937 (age 89) Carthage, South Dakota, U.S.
- Education: Gustavus Adolphus College (B.A.); William Mitchell College of Law (J.D.)

Paul Arthur Magnuson (born February 9, 1937) is a senior United States district judge of the United States District Court for the District of Minnesota.

== Early life and education ==
Paul A. Magnuson was born and raised on a farm near Carthage, South Dakota. He is the product of a one-room schoolhouse and graduated in a class of 13 from high school. Magnuson received his Bachelor of Arts degree in (1959) from Gustavus Adolphus College where he was active in athletics and student government, having served as Class President and Student Body President. He received his Juris Doctor (1963) from William Mitchell College of Law (again Class President) where he attended night law school while employed as assistant registrar, casualty claim adjuster, and law clerk.

== Career ==
=== Attorney and lecturer ===
Magnuson served as a private practicing attorney for 18 years in the firm of Levander, Gillen Miller and Magnuson, South Saint Paul, Minnesota, where his endeavors emphasized eminent domain and municipal law.

Magnuson served as a lecturer at William Mitchell College of Law and Hamline University School of Law from 1982 to 1989. From 1986 to 1991, Magnuson also served as Jurist in Residence at a number of undergraduate college liberal arts campuses in Minnesota. In 2010, Magnuson was a Fulbright Scholar at United International College, Zhuhai, China.

=== Federal judicial service ===
Magnuson was nominated by President Ronald Reagan and, upon confirmation, entered judicial service on November 16, 1981. During his judicial career, Magnuson has served on the Judicial Conference of the United States as a Member and Chair of the Bankruptcy Committee, and International Judicial Relations Committee, and a member of the Inter-Circuit Assignment Committee. He also served the Federal Judicial Center as a Member of the District Judges Education Committee. Magnuson was also a longtime member of the Board of Directors of the Federal Judges Association, where he held numerous executive offices.

In addition, Magnuson has traveled to some 50 countries where he has encouraged the development of independent, ethical judiciaries in emerging democracies. This work has primarily been in Eastern Europe, Central Asia, Asia, and Africa.

Magnuson served as Chief Judge from 1994 to 2001. In 2002, he assumed senior status where he continues to carry an active case load.

In 2009, Magnuson presided over a wrongful death civil suit over the killing of Fong Lee by a Minneapolis police officer. In the early 2020s, he presided over the federal civil rights cases of the four Minneapolis police officers—Derek Chauvin, Tou Thao, J. Alexander Kueng, and Thomas Lane—for the murder of George Floyd. In May 2025 Magnuson granted the second Trump administration's motion to dismiss with prejudice a proposed consent decree developed during the Biden administration with the aim of reducing racial disparities in the treatment of individuals by the Minneapolis Police Department.

== Sources ==
Legal offices
Preceded by Edward Devitt	Judge of the United States District Court for the District of Minnesota; 1981–2002	Succeeded by Joan N. Ericksen
Preceded by Diana E. Murphy	Chief Judge of the United States District Court for the District of Minnesota; 1994–2001	Succeeded by James M. Rosenbaum
