= Steven E. Carr =

American humanitarian

- Born: Idaho Falls, Idaho
- Education: Utah State University, Arizona State University (JD)
- Website: http://www.standcom.ch/m-carr.shtml

Steven E. Carr is an American attorney, entrepreneur, and social activist. He is notable for being the only American elected to the Standing Commission of the International Red Cross and Red Crescent Movement. The Standing Commission is the highest governing body of the entire worldwide movement, which has a multibillion-dollar budget and nearly 100 million volunteers. As of 2011, Carr is the Commission's vice chair.

== Biography ==
Steve Carr was born in Idaho Falls, Idaho, in 1957. He has a degree in political science from Utah State University and a J.D. degree from Arizona State University's Sandra Day O'Connor College of Law.

In 2007, Carr became the only American elected by Red Cross/Red Crescent societies and the states' signatories to the Geneva Conventions to the Standing Commission of the International Red Cross Movement, based in Geneva, Switzerland. He was re-elected in November 2011 and named the Commission's vice chair.

Carr served on the Board of Governors of the American Red Cross from 2002 to 2008 and chaired the International Services Committee. He has also served on the board of Refugees International and several organizations in Idaho. In addition to his other social and entrepreneurial activities, Carr also writes columns for the Idaho Falls Post Register and other regional publications.

Carr is the brother of entrepreneur and philanthropist Gregory C. Carr.
