= Edward Devitt =

American judge (1911–1992)

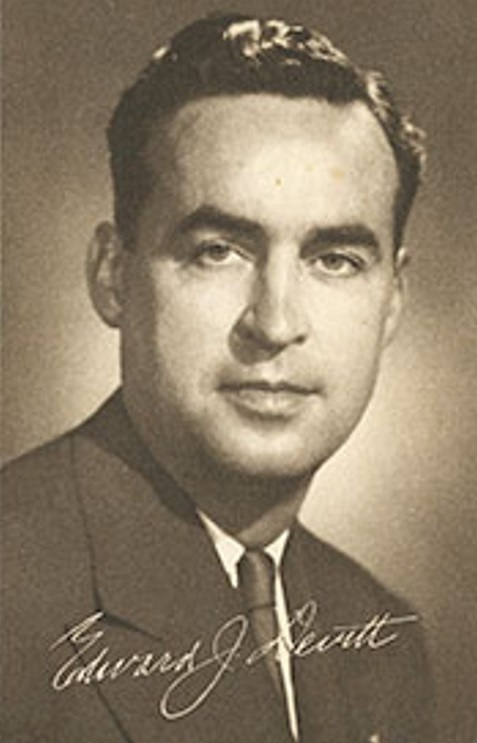
- Circa 1950. Collections of the U.S. House of Representatives.

Judge of the United States Foreign Intelligence Surveillance Court
- In office January 11, 1985 – March 2, 1992
- Appointed by: Warren Burger
- Preceded by: Dudley Baldwin Bonsal
- Succeeded by: Earl H. Carroll

Senior Judge of the United States District Court for the District of Minnesota
- In office May 1, 1981 – March 2, 1992

Chief Judge of the United States District Court for the District of Minnesota
- In office 1959–1981
- Preceded by: Gunnar Nordbye
- Succeeded by: Miles Lord

Judge of the United States District Court for the District of Minnesota
- In office December 10, 1954 – May 1, 1981
- Appointed by: Dwight D. Eisenhower
- Preceded by: Matthew M. Joyce
- Succeeded by: Paul A. Magnuson

Member of the U.S. House of Representatives from Minnesota's 4th district
- In office January 3, 1947 – January 3, 1949
- Preceded by: Frank Starkey
- Succeeded by: Eugene McCarthy

Personal details
- Born: Edward James Devitt; May 5, 1911 Saint Paul, Minnesota, U.S.
- Died: March 2, 1992 (aged 80) Saint Paul, Minnesota, U.S.
- Resting place: Resurrection Cemetery, Mendota Heights, Minnesota
- Party: Republican
- Education: University of North Dakota (B.S.); University of North Dakota School of Law (LL.B.)
- Profession: Attorney

Edward James Devitt (May 5, 1911 – March 2, 1992) was a U.S. representative from Minnesota and a United States district judge of the United States District Court for the District of Minnesota.

== Education and career ==
Born in Saint Paul, Minnesota, Devitt graduated from Saint John's Preparatory School in Collegeville in 1930. He attended Saint John's University from 1930 to 1932 before receiving a Bachelor of Laws from the University of North Dakota School of Law in 1935, and a Bachelor of Science degree from the University of North Dakota in 1938. Devitt was in private practice in East Grand Forks from 1935 to 1939, serving at the same time as a municipal judge of the Minnesota Municipal Court in East Grand Forks. He was an assistant state attorney general of Minnesota from 1939 to 1942. He served in the United States Naval Reserve during World War II as a Lieutenant Commander from 1942 to 1946.

== Congressional service ==
Devitt was elected as a Republican to the 80th Congress (January 3, 1947 – January 3, 1949) from Minnesota's 4th congressional district, defeating the DFL incumbent. He was unsuccessful in his bid for reelection in 1948, being defeated by Eugene McCarthy, who would later serve as a U.S. Senator and run for president. Devitt is the most recent Republican to have represented this district. In the House he sponsored a statute affecting tariffs on firewood, and he successfully amended the Marshall Plan to subsidize private relief shipments. Following his departure from Congress, he returned to private practice in Saint Paul from 1949 to 1950. He then served as a Judge of the Minnesota Probate Court for Ramsey County from 1950 to 1954.

== Federal judicial service ==
On December 10, 1954, Devitt received a recess appointment from President Dwight D. Eisenhower to a seat on the United States District Court for the District of Minnesota vacated by Judge Matthew M. Joyce. Formally nominated to the same seat by President Eisenhower on January 10, 1955, Devitt was confirmed by the United States Senate on February 4, 1955, and received his commission on February 7, 1955. He served as Chief Judge from 1959 to 1981, assuming senior status on May 1, 1981. In 1979, Devitt presided over the criminal trial for the five Red Lake Indian Reservation uprising defendants, imposing a 26-year prison sentence on uprising leader Harry S. Hanson Jr. Devitt would also impose prison sentences ranging from 10 to 16 years against Hanson's four co-defendants. He served as a board member of the Federal Judicial Center from 1968 to 1971. He served as a judge of the United States Foreign Intelligence Surveillance Court from 1985 to 1992. Devitt remained in senior status until his death in Saint Paul on March 2, 1992.

== Legacy ==
Devit was co-author of Federal Jury Practice and Instructions, a standard reference. The American Judicature Society has awarded the Edward J. Devitt Distinguished Service to Justice Award each year since 1983 to an Article III judge. The first recipient was Albert Branson Maris.

== See also ==
- Edward J. Devitt U.S. Courthouse and Federal Building in Fergus Falls, Minnesota

U.S. House of Representatives
Preceded by Frank Starkey	United States Representative from Minnesota's 4th congressional district 1947–1949	Succeeded by Eugene McCarthy
Legal offices
Preceded by Matthew M. Joyce	Judge of the United States District Court for the District of Minnesota; 1955–1981	Succeeded by Paul A. Magnuson
Preceded by Gunnar Nordbye	Chief Judge of the United States District Court for the District of Minnesota; 1959–1981	Succeeded by Miles Lord
Preceded by Dudley Baldwin Bonsal	Judge of the United States Foreign Intelligence Surveillance Court; 1985–1992	Succeeded by Earl H. Carroll
