= Roslyn O. Silver =

American judge (born 1946)

Senior Judge of the United States District Court for the District of Arizona
- Incumbent
- Assumed office September 3, 2013

Chief Judge of the United States District Court for the District of Arizona
- In office January 2011 – September 2013
- Preceded by: John Roll
- Succeeded by: Raner C. Collins

Judge of the United States District Court for the District of Arizona
- In office October 11, 1994 – September 3, 2013
- Appointed by: Bill Clinton
- Preceded by: Earl H. Carroll
- Succeeded by: John J. Tuchi

Personal details
- Born: Roslyn Elaine Olson; February 28, 1946 (age 80) Phoenix, Arizona, U.S.
- Education: University of California, Santa Barbara (BA); Arizona State University (JD)

Roslyn Elaine Olson Silver (born February 28, 1946) is a senior United States district judge of the United States District Court for the District of Arizona. She served as a Chief Judge for the district from 2011 to 2013.

== Early life and education ==
She was born Roslyn Elaine Olson in Phoenix, Arizona in 1946. She received a Bachelor of Arts degree from the University of California at Santa Barbara in 1968 and a Juris Doctor from Sandra Day O'Connor College of Law at Arizona State University in 1971.

== Career ==
Silver was a law clerk for Justice Lorna Lockwood of the Supreme Court of Arizona from 1971 to 1972. She was in private practice in Phoenix from 1972 to 1974. Silver then served as an adviser and litigator for the Education Division of the Navajo Nation's Native American Rights Fund from 1974 to 1976. She was an in house labor counsel for the Greyhound Corporation from 1976 to 1978. Silver returned to private practice in Phoenix in 1978 before becoming a trial attorney for the Equal Opportunity Commission in 1979. She was an Assistant United States Attorney for the District of Arizona from 1980 to 1984. Silver became an assistant Arizona attorney general in 1984 and served until she returned to the United States Attorney's office in 1986. In 1989, she was promoted to Chief of the criminal division.

=== Federal judicial service ===
Silver was nominated by President Bill Clinton on September 14, 1994, to a seat on the United States District Court for the District of Arizona vacated by Earl H. Carroll. She was confirmed by the United States Senate on October 7, 1994, and received her commission on October 11, 1994. She took senior status on September 3, 2013. Silver became Chief Judge in January 2011 after the shooting death of previous Chief Judge John Roll during the 2011 assassination attempt of Congresswoman Gabby Giffords, serving until she took senior status. She was appointed to the court under the name of Roslyn O. Moore-Silver.

== Awards and recognition ==
In 2013 Judge Silver was recognized, for outstanding service to Veterans’ Program, Arizona Army National Guard, Arizona Coalition for Military Families, and Arizona Veterans Magazine, and for outstanding achievement, Federal Bar Association, Phoenix Chapter

Legal offices
Preceded by Earl H. Carroll	Judge of the United States District Court for the District of Arizona; 1994–2013	Succeeded by John J. Tuchi
Preceded by John Roll	Chief Judge of the United States District Court for the District of Arizona; 2011–2013	Succeeded by Raner C. Collins
