= Sarah Buel =

American lawyer

- Born: 1953 (age 72–73)
- Education: Harvard University (BLA, JD)
- Occupations: Lawyer; anti-domestic violence activist
- Children: 1

Sarah M. Buel (born 1953) is an American lawyer and anti-domestic violence activist. In 1994 she was designated a Women's History Month Honoree by the National Women's History Project.

== Early life and education ==
She earned a bachelor's degree in liberal arts in 1987 from Harvard Extension School. She graduated cum laude from Harvard Law School in 1990, where she founded the Harvard Battered Women's Advocacy Project, the Harvard Women in Prison Project, and the Harvard Children and Family Rights Project.

== Career ==
Buel directs the Diane Halle Center for Family Justice at the Sandra Day O'Connor College of Law in Tempe, Arizona.

She is co-founder of the University of Texas Voices Against Violence program to provide services for victims of sexual assault, relationship violence, and stalking. She also co-founded the interdisciplinary University of Texas Institute on Domestic Violence and Sexual Assault. She is the faculty supervisor for the Survivor Support Network (SSN) and the student group, Society Encouraging Excellence Through Diversity (SEED).

Buel formerly served as special counsel for the Texas District and County Attorneys Association. She was a prosecutor for six years, most of that time in Quincy, Massachusetts. Earlier, Buel served as a victim advocate, state policy coordinator and as a paralegal.

She is the author of 28 articles and the recipient of ten awards.

She narrated the 1992 Academy Award-winning documentary "Defending Our Lives". In 1996, NBC called her one of the five most inspiring women in America.
