= Frank Starkey =

American politician

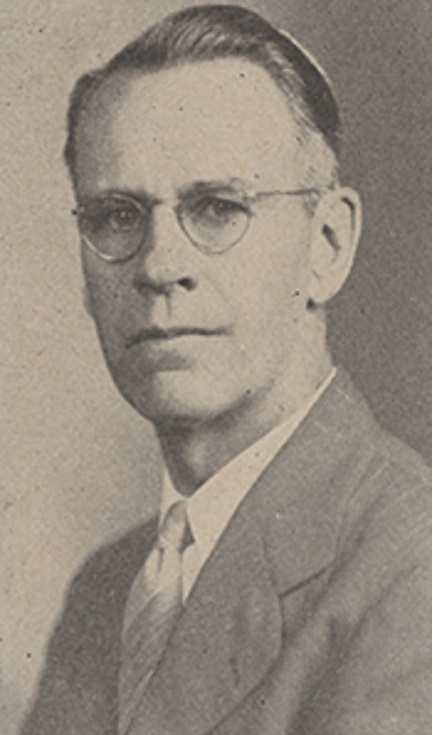
- From 1945's Pictorial Directory of the Victory Congress, 79th Congress—1st Session

Member of the U.S. House of Representatives from Minnesota's 4th district
- In office January 3, 1945 – January 3, 1947
- Preceded by: Melvin Maas
- Succeeded by: Edward Devitt

Member of the Minnesota House of Representatives
- In office 1923–1933

Personal details
- Born: 18 February 1892 Saint Paul, Minnesota, U.S.
- Died: 14 May 1968 (aged 76) Saint Paul, Minnesota, U.S.
- Resting place: Calvary Cemetery, Saint Paul, Minnesota, U.S.

Frank Thomas Starkey (February 18, 1892 – May 14, 1968) was a U.S. representative from Minnesota who was born in Saint Paul, Minnesota. Starkey began his political career as business representative of the local Milk Drivers Union from 1917 until 1933 and again in 1942 through 1944. He was a member of the Minnesota House of Representatives from 1923 until 1933, serving as chief clerk in 1933. Starkey was member of the State Industrial Commission from 1933 until 1939 and was vice president of the Minnesota State Federation of Labor for twelve years, serving as director of its research division in 1939 through 1942. He served as member of the Ramsey County Civil Service Commission from 1942 through 1944 and was elected as a Democrat to the 79th congress (1945 until 1947). His bid for reelection in 1946 to the 80th congress was unsuccessful. Starkey was also a writer for trade magazines and commissioner for the Department of Employment Security for a decade starting in 1955. He died in Saint Paul and was cremated; his ashes are interred in Calvary Cemetery in Saint Paul.

U.S. House of Representatives
| Preceded by Melvin Maas | U.S. Representative from Minnesota's 4th congressional district 1945 – 1947 | Succeeded by Edward Devitt |
