= James M. Rosenbaum =

American judge

James Michael Rosenbaum

Senior Judge of the United States District Court for the District of Minnesota
- In office October 26, 2009 – August 25, 2010

Chief Judge of the United States District Court for the District of Minnesota
- In office 2001–2008
- Preceded by: Paul A. Magnuson
- Succeeded by: Michael J. Davis

Judge of the United States District Court for the District of Minnesota
- In office July 18, 1985 – October 26, 2009
- Appointed by: Ronald Reagan
- Preceded by: Seat established by 98 Stat. 333
- Succeeded by: Susan Richard Nelson

Personal details
- Born: James Michael Rosenbaum; October 12, 1944 (age 81) Fort Snelling, Minnesota, U.S.
- Education: University of Minnesota (B.A.); University of Minnesota Law School (J.D.)

James Michael Rosenbaum (born October 12, 1944) is an American lawyer and former United States district judge of the United States District Court for the District of Minnesota. He has since become an arbitrator and mediator in private practice.

== Education and career ==
Born in Fort Snelling, Minnesota, Rosenbaum received a Bachelor of Arts degree from the University of Minnesota in 1966. He received a Juris Doctor from University of Minnesota Law School in 1969. He was an attorney for VISTA in Chicago, Illinois from 1969 to 1970. He was a staff attorney of the Leadership Council for Metropolitan Open Communities in Chicago from 1970 to 1972. He was in private practice of law in Minneapolis, Minnesota from 1973 to 1981. He was the United States Attorney for the District of Minnesota from 1981 to 1985.

== Federal judicial service ==
Rosenbaum was nominated by President Ronald Reagan on June 14, 1985, to the United States District Court for the District of Minnesota, to a new seat created by 98 Stat. 333. He was confirmed by the United States Senate on July 16, 1985, and received commission on July 18, 1985. He served as Chief Judge from 2001 to 2008. He assumed senior status on October 26, 2009. He retired on August 25, 2010.

== Post judicial service ==
After his retirement from the federal bench, Rosenbaum joined JAMS, the largest private provider of mediation and arbitration services worldwide, at its resolution center in Minnesota. Rosenbaum specializes as a mediator, arbitrator and discovery master in Minnesota and throughout the country. He manages disputes ranging from intellectual property and patent matters, complex and class action litigation, domestic and international, securities, civil rights, environmental and employment.

== Personal ==
His wife, Marilyn B. Rosenbaum (b. 1944), served as a judge in Hennepin County District Court from 1992 until her retirement in 2014.

== Sources ==
Legal offices
| Preceded by Seat established by 98 Stat. 333 | Judge of the United States District Court for the District of Minnesota; 1985–2009 | Succeeded by Susan Richard Nelson |
| Preceded by Paul A. Magnuson | Chief Judge of the United States District Court for the District of Minnesota; 2001–2008 | Succeeded by Michael J. Davis |
