= Arizona State Law Journal =

- Discipline: Law
- Language: English
- Edited by: Sarah Brunswick

Publication details
- Former names: Law and the Social Order
- History: 1969-present
- Publisher: Sandra Day O'Connor College of Law (United States)
- Frequency: Quarterly
- Open access: Yes

Standard abbreviations
- Bluebook: Ariz. St. L.J.
- ISO 4: Ariz. State Law J.

Indexing
- ISSN: 0164-4297
- LCCN: 74646264
- OCLC no.: 518153794

Links
- Journal homepage; Online access; Online archive

The Arizona State Law Journal is a quarterly student-edited law review covering the law and law-related topics published at the Sandra Day O'Connor College of Law. It was established in 1969 as Law and the Social Order, obtaining its current title in 1974. In the period from 2008 to 2015, the journal was the 66th most-cited law review by American courts and the ninety-fifth cited journal by other law reviews.

== See also ==
- List of law journals
