= Sandra Day O'Connor College of Law =

Graduate school at Arizona State University

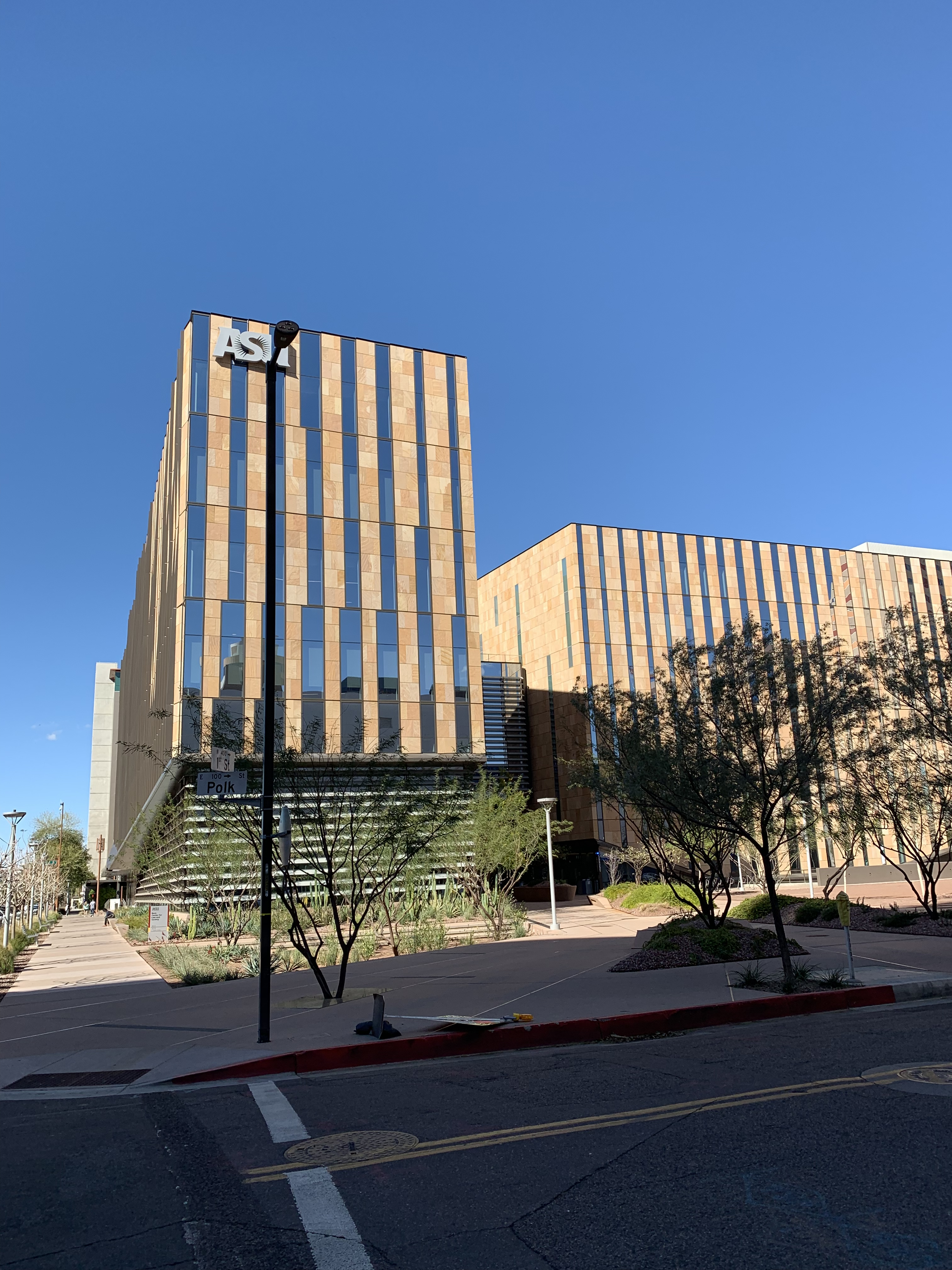
- Parent school: Arizona State University
- Established: 1965
- School type: Public
- Dean: Stacy Leeds
- Location: Phoenix, Arizona, U.S. 33.453299°N 112.0719049°W
- Enrollment: 812
- Faculty: 52
- USNWR ranking: 45th (2025)
- Bar pass rate: 86.6%
- Website: www.law.asu.edu

The Sandra Day O'Connor College of Law (ASU Law) is the law school at Arizona State University in Phoenix, Arizona. The school is in the Beus Center for Law and Society on ASU's downtown Phoenix campus. Created in 1965 as the Arizona State University College of Law upon recommendation of the Arizona Board of Regents, it held its first classes in the fall of 1967. The school has held American Bar Association accreditation since 1969 and is a member of the Order of the Coif. The school is also a member of the Association of American Law Schools. In 2006, the law school was renamed in honor of Phoenix resident, Stanford graduate, and retired Supreme Court Justice Sandra Day O'Connor.

== History ==
The school was previously located in Armstrong Hall, adjacent to the Ross-Blakley Law Library on ASU's Tempe campus. In 2012, the school announced plans to relocate to the Arizona State University Downtown Phoenix campus. The first classes held in the new building, the Beus Center for Law and Society, were in the fall semester of 2016. The new law building cost $129 million, which was paid for with construction bonds and private donations. The city of Phoenix provided land and $12 million. The building is named for Phoenix attorney Leo Beus, who donated $10 million to the law school in 2014.

Apart from the law school, the Beus Center also houses the Lincoln Center for Applied Ethics, The McCain Institute for International Leadership, the Sandra Day O'Connor Institute, Arizona Voice for Crime Victims, the Arizona Justice Project, and the ASU Alumni Law Group.

Best Choice Schools ranked the Beus Center the world's 6th most impressive law school building.

== Employment ==
According to ASU's official 2013 ABA-required disclosures, nine months after graduation, 68.6% of the Class of 2013 obtained full-time, long-term, JD-required employment (i.e. as attorneys), and 26% obtained JD-advantage employment. As a regional school, most ASU graduates find jobs in Arizona after graduation. Of the 204 graduates in 2013, 172 were employed in Arizona, with five in California and four in Texas. Additionally, ASU has an underemployment score of 12.7% as calculated by Law School Transparency and 8.8% of graduates are employed in school-funded positions.

ABA Employment Summary for 2013 Graduates
| Employment Status | Percentage |
| Employed – Bar Passage Required | 68.6% |
| Employed – J.D. Advantage | 26.0% |
| Employed – Professional Position | 1.0% |
| Employed – Non-Professional Position | 1.5% |
| Employed – Undeterminable | 0.0% |
| Pursuing Graduate Degree Full Time | 1.0% |
| Unemployed – Start Date Deferred | 0.5% |
| Unemployed – Not Seeking | 0.5% |
| Unemployed – Seeking | 0% |
| Employment Status Unknown | 1.0% |
Total of 204 Graduates

According to ASU's official 2017 ABA-required disclosures, nine months after graduation, 74.24% of the Class of 2017 obtained full-time, long-term, JD-required employment (i.e. as attorneys), and 14.65% obtained JD-advantage employment.

According to ASU's official 2020 ABA-required disclosures, nine months after graduation, 76.77% of the Class of 2020 obtained full-time, long-term, JD-required employment (i.e. as attorneys), and 10.63% obtained JD-advantage employment.

The class of 2020 had 175 students obtain jobs in Arizona within nine months of graduation. The remaining 22% of the class who obtained jobs within nine months of graduation did so outside of Arizona, including 16 jobs in California, 6 in Washington, D.C., and 5 in foreign countries.

== Costs ==
For the 2020–21 academic year, the yearly tuition for residents is $28,058, and the tuition for non-residents is $47,302.

== Clinical programs ==
The Sandra Day O'Connor College of Law has 13 clinics, which offer students opportunities to practice law in various settings with people who have real legal problems. Under the supervision of faculty members who are experts in their subject matter, students manage real cases and represent clients in hearings and trials before courts and administrative agencies. They also assist in the commercialization and monetization of new technologies, and mediate cases pending in the judicial system.

- Civil Justice Clinic
- First Amendment Clinic
- Immigration Law & Policy Clinic
- Indian Legal Clinic
- Lodestar Mediation Clinic
- Lisa Foundation Patent Law Clinic
- Post Conviction Clinic
- Prosecution Clinic
- Public Defender Clinic
- Technology Ventures Services Group

== Centers and other academic programs ==
- The Center for Law, Science & Innovation is focused on the intersection of law with science and technology. Its 26 faculty fellows, and numerous associated faculty, students, and research fellows explore law and policy in a world of rapidly changing technologies, through scholarship, education, and policy dialogue.
- The Center for Law & Global Affairs supports and inspires research, education and practice regarding emerging forms of transnational governance that extend beyond the traditional paradigms of international law. The center supports research and scholarship, develops courses and experiential learning programs, designs and manages international projects and engages in outreach with academic, policy and community partners.
- The Indian Legal Program was established in 1988 to provide legal education, and generate scholarship in the area of Indian law, and undertake public service to tribal governments. The program was founded by professor William Canby, Jr., who served as director until his appointment to the United States Court of Appeals for the Ninth Circuit.
- The Barrett and O'Connor Center opened in 2018 to solidify the university's contacts with the capital city. The center houses ASU's Washington, D.C.–based academic programs, including the Washington Bureau of the Walter Cronkite School of Journalism and Mass Communication, the Sandra Day O'Connor College of Law Rule of Law and Governance program, the Capital Scholars program, and the McCain Institute's Next Generation Leaders program, among many others. In addition to hosting classes and internships on-site, special lectures and seminars taught from the Barrett & O'Connor Washington Center are connected to classrooms in Arizona through video-conferencing technology. The Barrett and O'Connor center is located at 1800 I St NW, Washington, DC 20006, close to the White House.
- The ASU California Center is located in Santa Monica, California, and serves as a gateway to the Los Angeles market for ASU graduate students. The center offers classes for the College of Law, among other graduate programs at ASU.

== Notable lecturers and professors ==
- Angela M. Banks, specializes in immigration and citizenship
- Sarah Buel, anti-domestic violence activist
- Ehsan Zaffar, civil rights advocate
- Andrew Hurwitz, senior status judge, United States Court of Appeals for the Ninth Circuit, adjunct and visiting professor
- Michael J. Saks, fourth most cited scholar in the field of Law and Social Science.
- Rebecca Tsosie (former professor), Indian law scholar, former Regents Professor, since 2022 is the Morris K. Udall Professor of Law at the University of Arizona's James E. Rogers College of Law, associate justice on the Fort McDowell Yavapai Nation Supreme Court (2008–present), judge on the San Carlos Apache Court of Appeals (2007–2024)

== Law journals ==
- Arizona State Law Journal
- Jurimetrics: The Journal of Law, Science, and Technology
- Law Journal for Social Justice
- Arizona State Sports and Entertainment Law Journal
- Corporate and Business Law Journal

== Notable alumni ==
- Michael Daly Hawkins ('70) – Senior Judge, United States Court of Appeals for the Ninth Circuit
- Roslyn O. Silver ('71) – Chief Judge, United States District Court for the District of Arizona
- Harriet C. Babbitt ('72) – former U.S. Ambassador to the Organization of American States and Deputy Administrator of the U.S. Agency for International Development
- H. Bartow Farr, III ('73) - former law clerk to Justice William Rehnquist
- Ruth McGregor ('74) – former Chief Justice, Arizona Supreme Court
- Ed Pastor ('74) – U.S. Congressman, Arizona's 4th congressional district
- Barry G. Silverman ('76) – Senior Judge, United States Court of Appeals for the Ninth Circuit
- Terry Goddard ('76) – former Arizona Attorney General
- Michael D. Ryan ('77) – former Justice, Arizona Supreme Court
- Tena Campbell ('77) – Senior Judge, United States District Court for the District of Utah
- Phil Gordon ('78) – former Mayor of Phoenix, Arizona
- Douglas L. Rayes ('78) – Judge, United States District Court for the District of Arizona
- Grant Woods ('79) – former Arizona Attorney General
- Rebecca White Berch ('79) – Chief Justice, Arizona Supreme Court
- Richard D. Mahoney ('79) – former Arizona Secretary of State
- Fred DuVal ('80) – chairman, Arizona Board of Regents
- Rick Romley ('81) – former County Attorney for Maricopa County, Arizona
- George McCaskey ('81) – chairman, Chicago Bears
- Michael J. Ahearn ('82) – chairman and former CEO, First Solar
- Steven E. Carr ('84) – First and only American ever elected to the highest governing body of the International Red Cross and Red Crescent Movement
- David Yerushalmi ('84) – Co-founder and Senior Counsel of the American Freedom Law Center
- Ann Scott Timmer ('85) – Justice, Arizona Supreme Court
- John Lopez IV ('89) – Justice, Arizona Supreme Court
- Joe Rogers ('89) – former Lieutenant Governor of Colorado
- Bridget S. Bade ('90) – Judge, 9th Circuit Court of Appeals, former United States magistrate judge for the District of Arizona.
- Gloria Navarro ('92) – Judge, United States District Court for the District of Nevada
- Rachel Mitchell ('92) – Prosecutor who questioned Dr. Christine Blasey Ford during Brett Kavanaugh's hearing for confirmation to the United States Supreme Court.
- Diane Humetewa ('93) – Judge, United States District Court for the District of Arizona
- James Hamm ('97) – private criminal justice consultant, qualified in courts as an expert on prison policy and procedure, time computations
- Jerod E. Tufte ('02) – Justice, North Dakota Supreme Court
- Michael T. Liburdi ('02) – Judge, United States District Court for the District of Arizona
- Kyrsten Sinema ('04) – U.S. Senator from Arizona, former U.S. Representative from Arizona's 9th congressional district
- Courtney Ekmark ('20) – played basketball on two NCAA championship teams before transferring to ASU in 2016; enrolled in O'Connor in 2017 and played for the Sun Devils
