= Earl H. Carroll =

American judge (1925–2017)

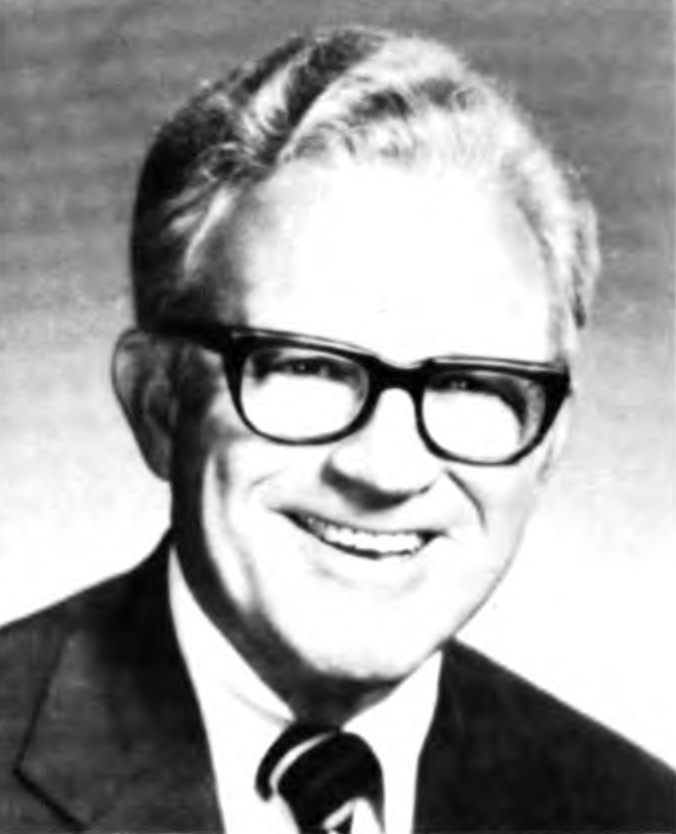

Senior Judge of the United States District Court for the District of Arizona
- In office October 10, 1994 – February 3, 2017

Judge of the United States Foreign Intelligence Surveillance Court
- In office February 2, 1993 – May 18, 1999
- Appointed by: William Rehnquist
- Preceded by: Edward Devitt
- Succeeded by: Michael J. Davis

Judge of the United States District Court for the District of Arizona
- In office June 30, 1980 – October 10, 1994
- Appointed by: Jimmy Carter
- Preceded by: Seat established by 92 Stat. 1629
- Succeeded by: Roslyn O. Silver

Personal details
- Born: Earl Hamblin Carroll; March 26, 1925 Tucson, Arizona, U.S.
- Died: February 3, 2017 (aged 91)
- Education: University of Arizona (BS, LLB)

Earl Hamblin Carroll (March 26, 1925 – February 3, 2017) was a United States district judge of the United States District Court for the District of Arizona.

== Education and career ==
Born in Tucson, Arizona, Carroll served as an ensign in the United States Navy during World War II, from 1943 to 1946. From 1943 to 1944, Carroll attended the Navy V-12 Program at Arizona State Teachers College at Flagstaff (now Northern Arizona University). Carroll later attended the University of California, Los Angeles from 1944 to 1945 and Harvard University from 1945 to 1946. He received a Bachelor of Science degree from the University of Arizona in 1948, and a Bachelor of Laws from the James E. Rogers College of Law at the University of Arizona in 1951. At the University of Arizona he was a member of the Sigma Chi Fraternity. After law school, Carroll served as a law clerk for the Arizona Supreme Court for one year from 1951 to 1952. He then went to work for the Phoenix law firm of Evans, Hull, Kitchel and Jenckes, where he worked from 1952 until 1980 as an associate, and later, as a partner. During that time, he was special counsel to the city of Tombstone, Arizona from 1962 to 1965.

== Federal judicial service ==
On June 2, 1980, Carroll was nominated by President Jimmy Carter to a new seat on the United States District Court for the District of Arizona created by 92 Stat. 1629. Carroll was confirmed by the United States Senate on June 26, 1980, received his commission on June 30, 1980, and was sworn in on September 12, 1980. On October 10, 1994, Carroll assumed senior status, opening up a judgeship position for Roslyn O. Silver. From 1994 to 2008, although on senior status, Carroll maintained a full draw of cases, and one of the heaviest caseloads in the district. Carroll retired into inactive senior status in 2011, remaining in that status until his death. Carroll was a Judge of the United States Foreign Intelligence Surveillance Court from 1993 to 1999, and Chief Judge of the United States Alien Terrorist Removal Court from 1996 to 2006.

=== Notable decisions ===
On May 7, 1988, the New York Times reported a notable case involving the dismissal of an employee from a small mining company in Eloy, Arizona, following the employee's refusal to attend mandatory religious services. Carroll permanently enjoined the mining company from holding mandatory services at the Eloy plant as an unlawful employment practice in violation of Title VII of the Civil Rights Act of 1964, which bars discrimination in employment based on religion.

Starting in July 2000, the Maricopa County Sheriff's website hosted images broadcast from cameras installed in the Madison Street Jail, which housed only pretrial detainees. A group of pretrial detainees sued Sheriff Joe Arpaio and the Sheriff's office, arguing that the internet broadcasts violated their rights under the Fourteenth Amendment. Carroll agreed and imposed an injunction. By a vote of 2 to 1, a 3-judge panel of the Ninth Circuit Court of Appeals affirmed Carroll's injunction, with the majority opinion stating: "We fail to see how turning pretrial detainees into the unwilling objects of the latest reality show serves any [...] legitimate goals [...] Inmates are not like animals in a zoo to be filmed and photographed at will".

In April 2008, Carroll granted in part and denied in part a motion for summary judgment by a group of Latino professors at Maricopa Community College, who had objected to their college's failure to discipline a math professor who distributed emails containing multiple racially charged and politically incorrect statements about immigration. In May 2010, a 3-judge panel of the Ninth Circuit Court of Appeals overturned the judge's ruling, holding that academic freedom protected the right of the math professor to speak his mind on controversial issues.

== Marriage and children ==
Carroll was married to Louise Rowlands since November 1, 1952. The couple has two daughters, Katherine and Margaret. Carroll died on February 3, 2017.

== Sources ==
Legal offices
Preceded by Seat established by 92 Stat. 1629	Judge of the United States District Court for the District of Arizona; 1980–1994	Succeeded by Roslyn O. Silver
Preceded by Edward Devitt	Judge of the United States Foreign Intelligence Surveillance Court; 1993–1999	Succeeded by Michael J. Davis
