= Matthew M. Joyce =

American judge

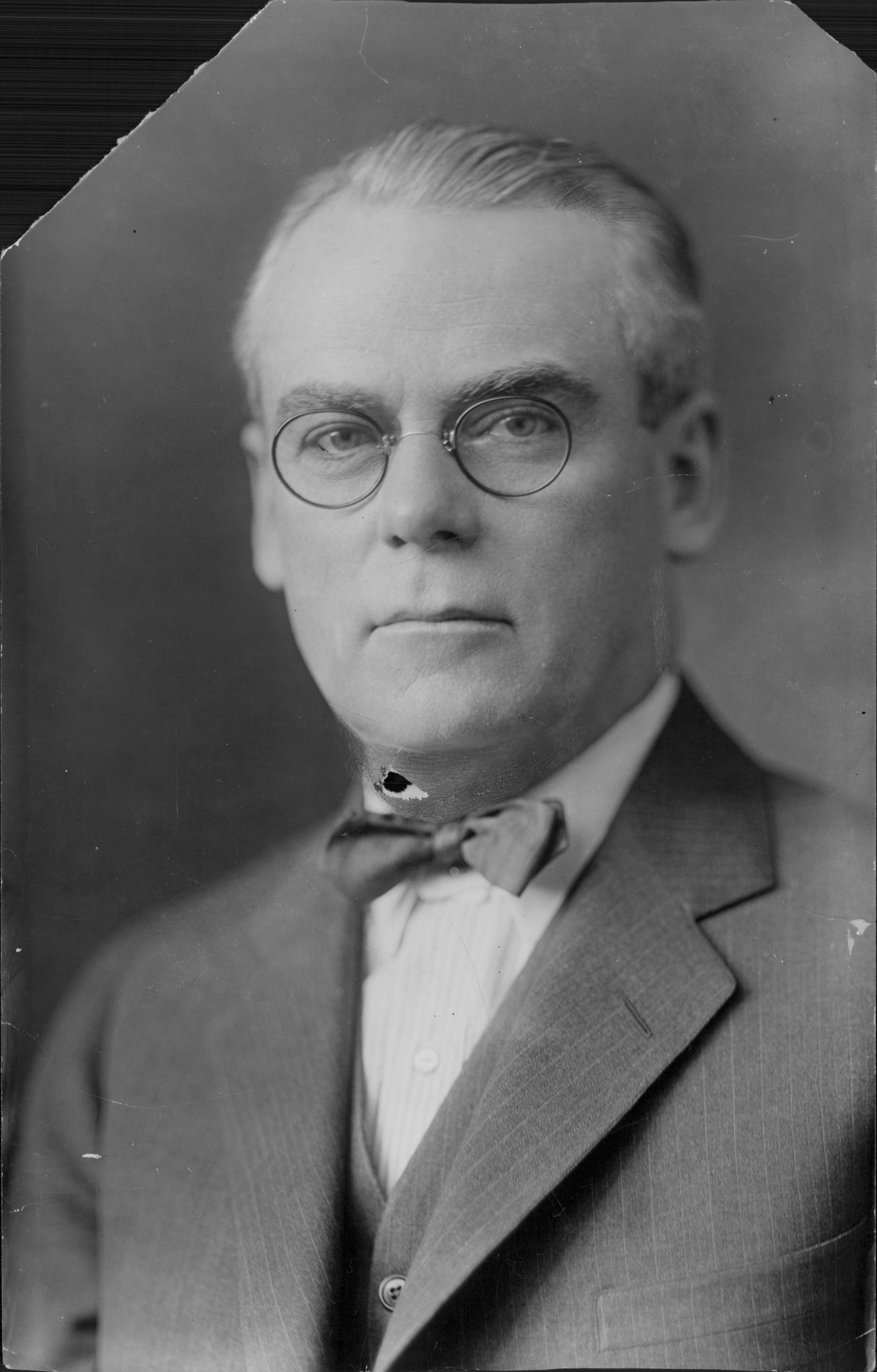

Senior Judge of the United States District Court for the District of Minnesota
- In office October 11, 1954 – January 12, 1956

Judge of the United States District Court for the District of Minnesota
- In office February 11, 1932 – October 11, 1954
- Appointed by: Herbert Hoover
- Preceded by: John B. Sanborn Jr.
- Succeeded by: Edward Devitt

Personal details
- Born: Matthew M. Joyce; April 29, 1877 Emmetsburg, Iowa, U.S.
- Died: January 12, 1956 (aged 78) Hennepin County, Minnesota, U.S.
- Education: University of Michigan Law School read law

Matthew M. Joyce (April 29, 1877 – January 12, 1956) was a United States district judge of the United States District Court for the District of Minnesota.

== Education and career ==
Born on April 29, 1877, in Emmetsburg, Iowa, Joyce attended the University of Michigan Law School and read law in 1900. He entered private practice in Missoula, Montana from 1900 to 1910. He continued private practice in Fort Dodge, Iowa from 1910 to 1917. He was an attorney for the Minneapolis and St. Louis Railway in Minneapolis, Minnesota from 1917 to 1932.

== Federal judicial service ==
Joyce was nominated by President Herbert Hoover on January 28, 1932, to a seat on the United States District Court for the District of Minnesota vacated by Judge John B. Sanborn Jr. He was confirmed by the United States Senate on February 3, 1932, and received his commission on February 11, 1932. He assumed senior status on October 11, 1954. His service terminated on January 12, 1956, due to his death in Hennepin County, Minnesota.

== See also ==
- United States District Court for the District of Minnesota

Legal offices
| Preceded by John B. Sanborn Jr. | Judge of the United States District Court for the District of Minnesota; 1932–1954 | Succeeded by Edward Devitt |
