= Robins Kaplan LLP =

American plaintiff's law firm

- Headquarters: Minneapolis, Minnesota
- No. of offices: 8
- No. of attorneys: 250
- Date founded: 1938
- Company type: Limited liability partnership
- Website: www.robinskaplan.com

Robins Kaplan LLP is an American plaintiffs' law firm headquartered in Minneapolis, Minnesota. Founded in 1938 as Robins & Davis, the firm is active in trial work in intellectual property, business litigation, antitrust, entertainment and media law, and mass tort. Robins Kaplan is one of the 350 largest law firms in the U.S. by size and one of the 200 top firms in the U.S. based on revenue.
