= List of justices of the Arizona Supreme Court =

This is a list of persons who have served as justices of the Arizona Supreme Court.

== Arizona Supreme Court justices ==
#	Justice	Born–died	Began term	Ended term	Term(s) as chief justice	Term(s) as vice chief justice	Party	Appointed by	Reason for termination
1	Alfred Franklin	1871–?	February 14, 1912	November 13, 1918	1912–1914; 1917	—	D	elected	resignation
2	Donnell L. Cunningham	1866–1947	February 14, 1912	January 4, 1921	1918–1920	—	D	elected	term expiration
3	Henry D. Ross	1861–1945	February 14, 1912	February 9, 1945	1915–1916; 1921–1922; 1927–1928; 1933–1934; 1939–1940; 1945–1945	—	D	elected	death
4	John Wilson Ross	1863–1945	November 13, 1918	January 6, 1919	—	—	D	Hunt (D)	term expiration
5	Albert C. Baker	1845–1921	January 6, 1919	August 31, 1921	—	—	D	elected	death
6	Archibald G. McAlister	1873–1950	January 4, 1921	January 1, 1945	1923–1926; 1931–1932; 1937–1938; 1943–1944	—	D	elected	term expiration
7	Edward Flanigan	1874–1932	September 28, 1921	January 1, 1923	—	—	R	Campbell (R)	term expiration
8	Frank H. Lyman	1863–1957	January 1, 1923	January 1, 1925	—	—	D	elected	term expiration
9	Alfred C. Lockwood	1875–1951	January 5, 1925	January 4, 1943	1929–1930; 1935–1936; 1941–1942	—	D	elected	term expiration
10	Rawghlie Clement Stanford	1879–1963	January 4, 1943	January 3, 1955	1945–1948; 1953–1953	—	D	elected	term expiration
11	Arthur T. LaPrade	1895–1957	January 1, 1945	June 30, 1957	1949–1950; 1955–1956	—	D	elected	death
12	Joseph H. Morgan	1884–1967	February 13, 1945	January 6, 1947	—	—	D	Osborn (D)	term expiration
13	Levi Stewart Udall	1891–1960	January 6, 1947	May 30, 1960	1951–1952; 1957–1958	—	D	elected	death
14	Evo Anton DeConcini	1901–1986	January 3, 1949	January 5, 1953	—	—	D	elected	term expiration
15	Marlin T. Phelps	1881–1964	January 4, 1949	January 3, 1961	1954–1954; 1959–1959	—	D	elected	term expiration
16	Dudley W. Windes	1888–1972	January 5, 1953	January 5, 1959	—	—	D	elected	term expiration
17	Fred C. Struckmeyer Jr.	1912–1992	January 3, 1955	January 4, 1982	1960–1961; 1966–1966; 1971–1971; 1980–1981	1965; 1970; 1975–1979	D	elected	mandatory retirement
18	J. Mercer Johnson	1906–1988	September 16, 1957	September 8, 1960	—	—	D	McFarland (D)	resignation
19	Charles C. Bernstein	1904–1976	January 5, 1959	January 2, 1969	1962–1963; 1967–1967	1961; 1966	D	elected	lost election
20	Jesse Addison Udall	1893–1980	June 15, 1960	January 15, 1972	1964–1964; 1969–1969	1962–1963; 1968; 1972	R	Fannin (R)	resignation
21	Robert O. Lesher	1921–2005	September 20, 1960	December 11, 1960	—	—	R	Fannin (R)	lost election
22	Renz L. Jennings	1899–1983	December 12, 1960	August 5, 1964	—	—	D	elected	resignation
23	Lorna E. Lockwood	1903–1977	January 3, 1961	September 15, 1975	1965–1965; 1970–1970	1964; 1969	D	elected	resignation
24	Edward W. Scruggs	1903–1974	August 5, 1964	January 3, 1965	—	—	R	Fannin (R)	lost election
25	Ernest McFarland	1894–1984	January 4, 1965	January 4, 1971	1968	1967	D	elected	term expiration
26	Jack D. H. Hays	1917–1995	January 4, 1969	January 5, 1987	1972–1974	1971	R	elected	resignation
27	James Duke Cameron	1925–2003	January 4, 1971	February 1, 1992	1975–1979	1972–1974	R	elected	resignation
28	William A. Holohan	1928–2010	January 17, 1972	January 2, 1989	1982–1987	1980–1981	R	Williams (R)	resignation
29	Frank Gordon Jr.	1929–2020	September 16, 1975	January 6, 1992	1987–1992	1982–1986	D	Castro (D)	resignation
30	Stanley G. Feldman	1933–present	January 19, 1982	December 10, 2002	1992–1997	1987–1991	D	Babbitt (D)	resignation
31	James Moeller	1933–2019	March 13, 1987	January 31, 1998	—	1992–1996	R	Mecham (R)	resignation
32	Robert J. Corcoran	1934–2010	January 5, 1989	February 29, 1996	—	—	D	Mofford (D)	resignation
33	Thomas A. Zlaket	1941–present	February 3, 1992	April 30, 2002	1997–2002	1996–1997	R	Symington (R)	resignation
34	Frederick J. Martone	1943–present	February 28, 1992	January 30, 2002	—	—	R	Symington (R)	elevation to D. Ariz.
35	Charles E. Jones	1935–2018	April 26, 1996	June 10, 2005	2002–2005	1997–2002	R	Symington (R)	mandatory retirement
36	Ruth McGregor	1943–present	January 28, 1998	June 30, 2009	2005–2009	2002–2005	D	Hull (R)	resignation
37	Rebecca White Berch	1955–present	March 13, 2002	September 28, 2015	2009–2014	2005–2009	R	Hull (R)	resignation
38	Michael D. Ryan	1945–2012	May 22, 2002	August 6, 2010	—	—	R	Hull (R)	resignation
39	Andrew D. Hurwitz	1947–present	January 27, 2003	June 26, 2012	—	2009–2012	D	Napolitano (D)	elevation to 9th Cir.
40	Scott Bales	1956–present	June 16, 2005	August 1, 2019	2014–2019	2012–2014	D	Napolitano (D)	resignation
41	John Pelander	1951–present	July 28, 2009	February 28, 2019	—	2014–2018	R	Brewer (R)	resignation
42	Robert M. Brutinel	1958–present	November 22, 2010	October 31, 2024	2019–2024	2018–2019	R	Brewer (R)	resignation
43	Ann Timmer	1960–present	October 12, 2012	incumbent	2024–present	2019–2024	R	Brewer (R)	—
44	Clint Bolick	1957–present	January 6, 2016	incumbent	—	—	I	Ducey (R)	—
45	Andrew Gould	1963–present	January 6, 2017	March 31, 2021	—	—	R	Ducey (R)	resignation
46	John Lopez IV	1968–present	January 6, 2017	incumbent	—	2024–present	R	Ducey (R)	—
47	James Beene	1965–present	June 17, 2019	incumbent	—	—	R	Ducey (R)	—
48	Bill Montgomery	1967–present	August 4, 2019	incumbent	—	—	R	Ducey (R)	—
49	Kathryn Hackett King	1980–present	July 8, 2021	incumbent	—	—	R	Ducey (R)	—
50	Maria Elena Cruz	1972–present	January 29, 2025	incumbent	—	—	D	Hobbs (D)	—

== Chief justices and vice chief justices ==
Each January, the justices select a chief and vice chief justice.

Chief Justice
Franklin	January 1912 – December 1914
H. Ross	January 1915 – December 1916
Franklin	January 1917 – December 1917
Cunningham	January 1918 – December 1920
H. Ross	January 1921 – December 1922
McAlister	January 1923 – December 1926
H. Ross	January 1927 – December 1928
A. Lockwood	January 1929 – December 1930
McAlister	January 1931 – December 1932
H. Ross	January 1933 – December 1934
A. Lockwood	January 1935 – December 1936
McAlister	January 1937 – December 1938
H. Ross	January 1939 – December 1940
A. Lockwood	January 1941 – December 1942
McAlister	January 1943 – December 1944
H. Ross	January 1945 – February 1945
Stanford	February 1945 – December 1948
LaPrade	January 1949 – December 1950
L. Udall	January 1951 – December 1952
Stanford	January 1953 – December 1953
Phelps	January 1954 – December 1954
LaPrade	January 1955 – December 1956
L. Udall	January 1957 – December 1958
Phelps	January 1959 – December 1959
Struckmeyer Jr.	January 1960 – December 1961
Bernstein	January 1962 – December 1963
J. Udall	January 1964 – December 1964
L. Lockwood	January 1965 – December 1965
Struckmeyer Jr.	January 1966 – December 1966
Bernstein	January 1967 – December 1967
McFarland	January 1968 – December 1968
J. Udall	January 1969 – December 1969
L. Lockwood	January 1970 – December 1970
Struckmeyer Jr.	January 1971 – December 1971
Hays	January 1972 – December 1974
Cameron	January 1975 – December 1979
Struckmeyer Jr.	January 1980 – December 1981
Holohan	January 1982 – January 1987
Gordon Jr.	January 1987 – January 1992
Feldman	January 1992 – January 1997
Zlaket	January 1997 – January 2002
Jones	January 2002 – June 2005
McGregor	June 2005 – June 2009
Berch	July 2009 – June 2014
Bales	July 2014 – June 2019
Brutinel	July 2019 – June 2024
Timmer	July 2024 – present

Vice Chief Justice
Bernstein	1961
J. Udall	1962 – 1963
L. Lockwood	1964
Struckmeyer Jr.	1965
Bernstein	1966
McFarland	1967
J. Udall	1968
L. Lockwood	1969
Struckmeyer Jr.	1970
Hays	1971
J. Udall	January 1972
Beene	1972 – 1974
Struckmeyer Jr.	1975 – 1979
Holohan	1980 – 1981
Lyman	1982 – 1986
Feldman	1987 – 1991
Moeller	1992 – 1996
Zlaket	1996 – January 1997
Jones	January 1997 – January 2002
McGregor	January 2002 – June 2005
Berch	June 2005 – June 2009
Hurwitz	July 2009 – June 2012
Bales	June 2012 – June 2014
J. Ross	June 2014 – January 2018
Brutinel	January 2018 – June 2019
Timmer	July 2019 – June 2024
Lopez	July 2024 – present

== Succession of seats ==
Seat 1
Seat established 1912
Franklin	Democratic	1912–1918
J. Ross	Democratic	1918–1919
Baker	Democratic	1919–1921
Flanigan	Republican	1921–1923
Lyman	Democratic	1923–1925
A. Lockwood	Democratic	1925–1943
Stanford	Democratic	1943–1955
Struckmeyer Jr.	Democratic	1955–1982
Feldman	Democratic	1982–2002
Hurwitz	Democratic	2003–2012
Timmer	Republican	2012–present

Seat 2
Seat established 1912
Cunningham	Democratic	1912–1921
McAlister	Democratic	1921–1945
LaPrade	Democratic	1945–1957
Johnson	Democratic	1957–1960
Lesher	Republican	1960
Jennings	Democratic	1960–1964
Scruggs	Republican	1964–1965
McFarland	Democratic	1965–1971
Cameron	Republican	1971–1992
Martone	Republican	1992–2001
Berch	Republican	2002–2015
Bolick	Independent	2016–present

Seat 3
Seat established 1912
H. Ross	Democratic	1912–1945
Morgan	Democratic	1945–1947
L. Udall	Democratic	1946–1960
J. Udall	Republican	1960–1972
Holohan	Republican	1972–1989
Corcoran	Democratic	1989–1996
Jones	Republican	1996–2005
Bales	Democratic	2005–2019
Montgomery	Republican	2019–present

Seat 4
Seat established 1949
DeConcini	Democratic	1949–1953
Windes	Democratic	1953–1959
Bernstein	Democratic	1959–1969
Hays	Republican	1969–1987
Moeller	Republican	1987–1998
McGregor	Democratic	1998–2009
Pelander	Republican	2009–2019
Beene	Republican	2019–present

Seat 5
Seat established 1949
Phelps	Democratic	1949–1961
L. Lockwood	Democratic	1961–1975
Gordon Jr.	Democratic	1975–1992
Zlaket	Republican	1992–2002
Ryan	Republican	2002–2010
Brutinel	Republican	2010–2024
Cruz	Democratic	2025–present

Seat 6
Seat established 2016
Gould	Republican	2016–2021
King	Republican	2021–present

Seat 7
Seat established 2016
Lopez IV	Republican	2016–present

== Arizona Territorial Supreme Court justices ==
Two additional appointees were confirmed by the U.S. Senate to the territorial supreme court, but declined their appointments: John Noble Goodwin in 1863 and Marshall H. Williams in 1894.

#	Justice	State	Born–died	Began term (oath of office)	Ended term	Term as chief justice	Appointed by	Reason for termination
1	William F. Turner	IA	1816–1899	December 29, 1863	April 18, 1870	1863–1870	Lincoln (R); A. Johnson (D)	removal
2	Joseph P. Allyn	CT	1833–1869	December 29, 1863	July 1867	—	Lincoln (R)	term expiration
3	William Thompson Howell	MI	1810–1870	December 29, 1863	June 11, 1864	—	Lincoln (R)	resignation
4	Henry T. Backus	MI	1809–1877	December 26, 1865	1869	—	Lincoln (R)	term expiration
5	Harley High Cartter	ID	1810–1874	July 1867	August 29, 1869	—	A. Johnson (D)	removal
6	Isham Reavis	NE	1836–1914	August 29, 1869	April 12, 1872	—	Grant (R)	resignation
7	John Titus	PA	1812–1876	October 30, 1869	July 6, 1874	1870–1874	Grant (R)	term expiration
8	Charles Austin Tweed	CA	1813–1887	August 12, 1870	May 1878	—	Grant (R)	term expiration
9	DeForest Porter	NE	1840–1889	April 12, 1872	June 7, 1882	—	Grant (R); Hayes (R)	resignation
10	Edmund Francis Dunne	DC	1835–1904	July 6, 1874	February 1, 1876	1874–1876	Grant (R)	removal
11	C. G. W. French	CA	1822–1891	February 1, 1876	May 20, 1884	1876–1884	Grant (R); Hayes (R)	term expiration
12	Charles Silent	CA	1842–1918	May 1878	October 18, 1880	—	Hayes (R)	resignation
13	William Henry Stilwell	NY	1849–1928	February 1881	September 2, 1882	—	Garfield (R)	removal
14	Daniel H. Pinney	IL	1837–1921	July 1882	November 9, 1885	—	Arthur (R)	removal
15	Wilson W. Hoover	CA	c. 1849–1926	September 2, 1882	March 23, 1883	—	Arthur (R)	removal
16	A. W. Sheldon	MD	c. 1842–1884	May 15, 1883	January 31, 1884	—	Arthur (R)	death
17	William F. Fitzgerald	MS	1846–1903	April 7, 1884	October 31, 1885	—	Arthur (R)	removal
18	Sumner Howard	MI	1835–1902	May 20, 1884	November 9, 1885	1884–1885	Arthur (R)	resignation
19	William H. Barnes	IL	1843–1904	October 31, 1885	November 2, 1889	—	Cleveland (D)	term expiration
20	John C. Shields	MI	1848–1892	November 9, 1885	June 7, 1886	1885–1886	Cleveland (D)	nomination rejection
21	William Wood Porter	CA	1826–1907	November 9, 1885	August 1889	—	Cleveland (D)	removal
22	James Henry Wright	MO	1838–1905	March 19, 1887	May 7, 1890	1887–1890	Cleveland (D)	removal
23	Joseph Henry Kibbey	AZ	1853–1924	August 1889	May 2, 1893	—	B. Harrison (R)	removal
24	Richard Elihu Sloan	AZ	1857–1933	November 2, 1889	June 1, 1894	—	B. Harrison (R)	term expiration
25	Henry C. Gooding	IN	1838–1913	May 7, 1890	May 24, 1893	1890–1893	B. Harrison (R)	resignation
26	Edmund W. Wells	AZ	1846–1938	March 5, 1891	March 6, 1893	—	B. Harrison (R)	resignation
27	John J. Hawkins	AZ	1855–1935	April 19, 1893	July 19, 1897	—	Cleveland (D)	term expiration
28	Owen Thomas Rouse	AZ	1843–1919	May 2, 1893	July 20, 1897	—	Cleveland (D)	removal
29	Albert C. Baker	AZ	1845–1921	May 24, 1893	July 20, 1897	1893–1897	Cleveland (D)	term expiration
30	Joseph D. Bethune	AZ	1842–1912	June 1, 1894	August 10, 1897	—	Cleveland (D)	removal
31	Richard Elihu Sloan	AZ	1857–1933	July 19, 1897	May 1, 1909	—	McKinley (R); T. Roosvelt (R)	elevation to governor
32	Hiram Truesdale	AZ	1860–1897	July 20, 1897	October 28, 1897	1897	McKinley (R)	death
33	Fletcher Morris Doan	AZ	1846–1924	July 20, 1897	February 14, 1912	—	McKinley (R); T. Roosevelt (R); Taft (R)	court abolition
34	George Russell Davis	AZ	1861–1933	August 10, 1897	March 31, 1905	—	McKinley (R); T. Roosvelt (R)	resignation
35	Webster Street	AZ	1846–1908	November 15, 1897	March 21, 1902	1897–1902	McKinley (R)	term expiration
36	Edward Kent Jr.	CO	1862–1916	March 21, 1902	February 14, 1912	1902–1912	T. Roosevelt (R); Taft (R)	court abolition
37	John H. Campbell	AZ	1868–1928	March 22, 1905	February 14, 1912	—	T. Roosevelt (R); Taft (R)	court abolition
38	Eugene A. Tucker	NE	1856–1942	April 1, 1905	October 13, 1905	—	T. Roosevelt (R)	resignation
39	Frederick S. Nave	AZ	1873–1912	November 17, 1905	April 1, 1909	—	T. Roosevelt (R)	resignation
40	Ernest W. Lewis	AZ	1875–1927	May 22, 1909	February 14, 1912	—	Taft (R)	court abolition
41	Edward M. Doe	AZ	1850–1919	May 27, 1909	February 14, 1912	—	Taft (R)	court abolition

== Succession of seats ==
Chief Justice
Seat established 1863
Turner	IA	1863–1870
Titus	PA	1870–1874
Dunne	DC	1874–1876
French	CA	1876–1884
Howard	MI	1884–1885
Shields	MI	1885–1886
Wright	MO	1887–1890
Gooding	IN	1890–1893
Baker	AZ	1893–1897
Truesdale	AZ	1897
Street	AZ	1897–1902
Kent Jr.	CO	1902–1912
Seat eliminated 1912 upon statehood

Seat 2
Seat established 1863
Allyn	CT	1863–1867
Cartter	ID	1867–1869
Reavis	NE	1869–1872
D. Porter	NE	1872–1882
Pinney	IL	1882–1885
W. Porter	CA	1885–1889
Kibbey	AZ	1889–1893
Rouse	AZ	1893–1897
Doan	AZ	1897–1912
Seat eliminated 1912 upon statehood

Seat 3
Seat established 1863
Howell	MI	1863–1864
Backus	MI	1865–1869
Titus	PA	1869–1870
Tweed	CA	1870–1878
Silent	CA	1878–1880
Stilwell	NY	1881–1882
Hoover	CA	1882–1883
Sheldon	MD	1883–1884
Fitzgerald	MS	1884–1885
Barnes	IL	1885–1889
Sloan	AZ	1889–1894
Bethune	AZ	1894–1897
Davis	AZ	1897–1905
Tucker	NE	1905
Nave	AZ	1905–1909
Lewis	AZ	1909–1912
Seat eliminated 1912 upon statehood

Seat 4
Seat established 1891
Wells	AZ	1891–1893
Hawkins	AZ	1893–1897
Sloan	AZ	1897–1909
Doe	AZ	1909–1912
Seat eliminated 1912 upon statehood

Seat 5
Seat established 1905
Campbell	AZ	1905–1912
Seat eliminated 1912 upon statehood

== Sources ==
- Arizona Supreme Court Justices
- Arizona Constitution, Article VI
- Arizona Judicial Branch
