= Planned Parenthood Arizona v. Mayes =

Arizona Supreme Court case

Planned Parenthood Arizona, et al. v. Mayes
- Court: Arizona Supreme Court
- Full case name: Planned Parenthood Arizona, Inc., Successor-in-interest to Planned Parenthood Center of Tucson, Inc., Laura Conover, Pima County Attorney, appellants, v. Kristin K. Mayes, Attorney General of the State of Arizona, Appelee, and Eric Hazelbrigg, M.D., as guardian Ad Litem of unborn child Jane Doe and all other unborn infants similarly situated; Dennis McGrane, Yavapai County Attorney, Intervenors
- Decided: April 9, 2024
- Verdict: 4-2
- Citation: CV-23-0005-PR

Case history
- Appealed from: Superior Court of Pima County, No. C127867
- Appealed to: Court of Appeals, Division 2, 254 Ariz. 401 (App. 2022)
- Argument: Oral argument

Court membership
- Chief judge: Robert M. Brutinel
- Associate judges: Ann Timmer; Clint Bolick; John Lopez IV; James Beene; Bill Montgomery; Kathryn Hackett King

Case opinions
- Decision by: Lopez, joined by Bolick, King, Beene
- Dissent: Timmer, joined by Brutinel
- Montgomery took no part in the consideration or decision of the case.

Laws applied
- Arizona Revised Statutes § 13-3603, 36-2322
- Superseded by
- Arizona HB 2677 (in part); Ariz. Const. art. II, § 8.1 (in whole)

Planned Parenthood Arizona, et al. v. Kris Mayes was an Arizona Supreme Court case in which the court upheld an 1864 law criminalizing abortions except to save the life of the mother. Arizona Attorney General Kris Mayes did not enforce the law when it was in effect. The law was repealed on May 2, 2024, and the repeal took effect on September 14, 2024. The case was overturned by 2024 Arizona Proposition 139 passing on November 5, 2024, establishing a right to abortion in the Constitution of Arizona.

== Events ==
On April 9, 2024, the Arizona Supreme Court ruled in Planned Parenthood of Arizona v. Mayes that the 1864 law could be enforced, to take effect 14 days later, but with no retroactive enforcement. As a result, abortion in Arizona temporarily became de jure illegal, except for when it is "necessary to save" the life of the mother. There were no exceptions for rape or incest, and the legally prescribed sentence for assisting in an illegal abortion is 2–5 years in prison.

Arizona Attorney General Kris Mayes, a Democrat, responded to the Arizona Supreme Court decision by declaring that "as long as I am Attorney General, no woman or doctor will be prosecuted under this draconian law in this state." Mayes criticized the Arizona Supreme Court for having "risked the health and lives of Arizonans", after "effectively striking down a law passed this century and replacing it with one from 160 years ago ... when Arizona wasn't a state, the Civil War was raging, and women couldn't even vote".

On May 2, 2024, Arizona Governor Katie Hobbs signed the bill to repeal the 1864 ban. In May 2024, the Arizona Supreme Court accepted Attorney General Mayes' request to further stay the 1864 abortion law, as they stayed enforcement of the 1864 abortion law until August 12, 2024. Mayes responded that the stay applied in the other legal case would result in another delay of enforcement to September 26, 2024. The repeal took effect 90 days after the legislative session ended, on September 14, 2024.

Arizona for Abortion Access, a campaign intending to introduce a November 2024 ballot proposal to protect abortion within the Arizona Constitution, gathered signatures up to July 2024 for their petition to introduce the amendment. On November 5, 2024, 2024 Arizona Proposition 139 was passed, enacting a right to abortion in the Constitution of Arizona.
