= Levi Stewart Udall =

American judge (1891–1960)

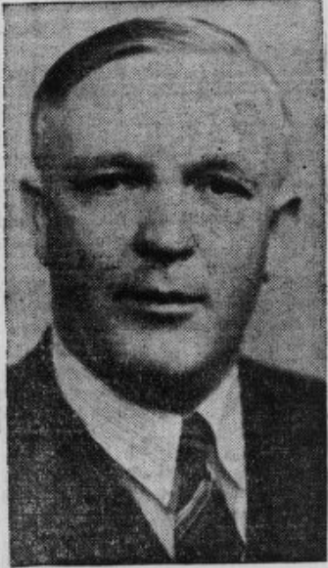

Chief Justice of the Arizona Supreme Court
- In office January 1957 – December 1958
- Preceded by: Arthur T. LaPrade
- Succeeded by: Marlin T. Phelps
- In office January 1951 – December 1952
- Preceded by: Arthur T. LaPrade
- Succeeded by: R.C. Stanford

Justice of the Arizona Supreme Court
- In office January 6, 1947 – May 30, 1960
- Preceded by: Joseph H. Morgan
- Succeeded by: Jesse Addison Udall

Personal details
- Born: January 20, 1891 St. Johns, Apache, Territory of Arizona
- Died: May 30, 1960 (aged 69) Wickenburg, Arizona
- Party: Democratic
- Spouse: Louise Lee

Levi Stewart Udall (January 20, 1891 – May 30, 1960) was an American lawyer who served as chief justice of the Arizona Supreme Court. He was a member of the Udall political family.

Born and raised in Arizona, he was the son of David King Udall, a politician, and Ella Stewart Udall, the first telegraph operator in the Arizona Territory. He was named after his grandfather, Levi Stewart. He was a member of the Church of Jesus Christ of Latter-day Saints.

In 1914 he married Louisa Lee, a granddaughter of John D. Lee and Jacob Hamblin. They would later have six children.

He passed the Arizona Bar exam in 1922, and was admitted to the bar, without having earned a law degree (a common practice in those days). Later that year he succeeded his father as stake president of the St. Johns Stake, a position he held until 1945.

In 1922, he lost a bid to be elected as clerk to the Arizona Superior Court. He was defeated by his older brother John Hunt Udall.

In 1946 he was elected to the Arizona Supreme Court, and remained a Justice of that court from 1947 until his death. In 1948 Udall wrote the majority opinion of the Arizona State Supreme Court granting Native Americans living on reservations the right to vote. From 1951 to 1952 and 1957–1958 he served as the chief justice of that court.

In 1960 he was awarded an honorary Doctor of Laws degree from the University of Arizona. He died on May 30 of that year.

== Legacy ==
- His half-brother, Jesse Addison Udall, succeeded him as Justice and later Chief Justice of the Arizona Supreme court.
- His son Stewart Udall, was a U.S. Congressman from Arizona, and U.S. Secretary of the Interior.
- Another of his sons, Mo Udall, was a U.S. Congressman for 30 years, and a candidate for President of the United States in 1976.
- His grandson, Mark Udall, was a U.S. Senator from Colorado from 2009 to 2015 and was a U.S. Congressman from 1999 to 2009.
- His grandson, Tom Udall, is a U.S. Senator from New Mexico from 2009 to 2021 and was a U.S. Congressman from 1999 to 2009.
- His son, D. Burr Udall, is a practicing attorney at the Udall Law Firm LLP in Tucson, Arizona.

Legal offices
| Preceded by Joseph H. Morgan | Justice of the Arizona Supreme Court; 1947–1960 | Succeeded by Jesse Addison Udall |
| Preceded by Arthur T. LaPrade | Chief Justice of the Arizona Supreme Court; 1951–1952 | Succeeded by Rawghlie Clement Stanford |
| Preceded by Arthur T. LaPrade | Chief Justice of the Arizona Supreme Court; 1957–1958 | Succeeded by Marlin T. Phelps |
