= Charles Bernstein =

Charles Bernstein may refer to:

- Charles Bernstein (composer) (born 1943), American composer of film and television scores
- Charles Bernstein (poet) (born 1950), American poet, essayist, editor, and literary scholar
- Charles C. Bernstein, jurist and justice of the Supreme Court of Arizona
