= William A. Holohan =

American judge (1928–2010)

38th Chief Justice of the Arizona Supreme Court
- In office January 1, 1982 – January 1, 1987
- Preceded by: Fred C. Struckmeyer Jr.
- Succeeded by: Frank X. Gordon Jr.

Justice of the Arizona Supreme Court
- In office January 17, 1972 – January 2, 1989
- Appointed by: Jack Williams
- Preceded by: Jesse Addison Udall
- Succeeded by: Robert J. Corcoran

Personal details
- Born: June 1, 1928 Tucson, Arizona, U.S.
- Died: July 23, 2010 (aged 82) Peoria, Arizona, U.S.
- Education: University of Arizona

William Andrew Holohan (July 1, 1928 – July 23, 2010) was a justice of the Arizona Supreme Court, serving from 1972 until his retirement in 1989. Holohan served as chief justice from 1982 to 1987.

Holohan served as an Assistant United States Attorney to then-United States Attorney Jack D. H. Hays. Holohan was considered conservative in his legal and political views but progressive in judicial reform.

In 1988, Holohan wrote the opinion of the court in Green v. Osborne, a 4–1 decision that canceled a recall election for Evan Mecham because Mecham already had been impeached and removed as governor." Other notable opinions include a "1982 reversal of a lower-court ruling that declared Arizona Downs' lease at Turf Paradise to be unconstitutional and a violation of antitrust laws."
