= Jesse Addison Udall =

American jurist (1893–1980)

Chief Justice of the Arizona Supreme Court
- In office January 1964 – December 1964
- Preceded by: Charles C. Bernstein
- Succeeded by: Lorna E. Lockwood

Justice of the Arizona Supreme Court
- In office 1960–1972
- Preceded by: Levi Stewart Udall
- Succeeded by: William A. Holohan

Member of the Arizona House of Representatives from the 14th district
- In office 1931–1938

Personal details
- Born: June 24, 1893 Eagar, Territory of Arizona
- Died: May 11, 1980 (aged 86) Phoenix, Arizona, U.S.
- Party: Republican
- Spouse(s): Lela Lee (died 1976) Lillian Cluff Jenkins (m. 1978)
- Children: 6
- Parents: David King Udall (father); Ida Hunt Udall (mother)
- Relatives: Addison Pratt (great-grandfather); Stewart Udall (nephew); Mo Udall (nephew); Gordon H. Smith (grandson)
- Education: University of Arizona Law School

Jesse Addison Udall (June 24, 1893 – May 11, 1980) was an American jurist and member of the Udall political family who served as chief justice of the Arizona Supreme Court. He also served in the Arizona House of Representatives.

== Early life ==
Jesse Udall was born on June 24, 1893, at a house near Eagar, Arizona, to Ida Frances (née Hunt) and David King Udall. He was named after Jesse Nathaniel Smith and Addison Pratt, his great-grandfather. He served as an ambulance driver for the U.S. Army in France during World War I. He graduated from the University of Arizona Law School in 1924.

== Career ==
Udall practiced law in Safford. He was a county attorney in Graham County in 1925 and 1926. He was a Republican and served as in the Arizona House of Representatives from 1930 to 1943. In 1939, he became judge of the Arizona Superior Court.

Udall helped organize an Arizona National Guard company during World War II. He was the chief of the Army Internal Security Division's review section in Washington, D.C. In 1945, he continued his law practice in Safford. In 1956, he returned as judge of the Arizona Superior Court. He served in that role until 1958. He then served as president of the Southern California mission for the Church of Jesus Christ of Latter Day Saints. In 1960, Governor Paul Fannin appointed him to succeed his brother Levi on the Arizona Supreme Court. He was chief justice of the supreme court in 1964 and 1969.

Udall was bishop of the Thatcher Ward and was twice president of St. Joseph Stake Academy. He was also a patriarch of Tempe Stake.

== Personal life ==
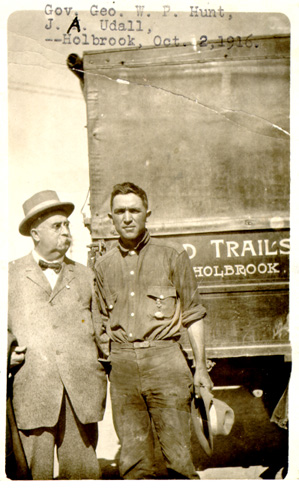
Udall (right) and Arizona Governor George W. P. Hunt, 1916.

Udall married Lela Lee. She died in 1976. He married Lillian (née Cluff) Jenkins in 1978. He had six children, Jessica, Addison R., Kenyon, Lela Lee, Mary Louise and David K. His nephews were U.S. Secretary of the Interior Stewart Udall and U.S. Representative Mo Udall. His grandson, Gordon H. Smith was a U.S. Senator from Oregon. His grandson Jesse Udall is the husband of Michelle Udall. He lived on Alameda Drive in Tempe.

Udall died on May 11, 1980, aged 86, at a hospital in Phoenix.

Legal offices
Preceded by Levi Stewart Udall	Justice of the Arizona Supreme Court; 1960–1972	Succeeded by William A. Holohan
Preceded by Charles C. Bernstein	Chief Justice of the Arizona Supreme Court; 1964	Succeeded by Lorna E. Lockwood
Preceded by Ernest W. McFarland	Chief Justice of the Arizona Supreme Court; 1969	Succeeded by Lorna E. Lockwood
