= Edward Flanigan =

American judge (1874–1932)

Edward J. Flanigan
- Edward Flanigan, circa 1900

Justice of the Arizona Supreme Court
- In office September 28, 1921 – January 1, 1923
- Preceded by: Albert C. Baker
- Succeeded by: Frank H. Lyman

Personal details
- Born: October 19, 1874 San Francisco, California, U.S.
- Died: December 13, 1932 (aged 58) near Van Horn, Texas, U.S.

Edward Joseph Flanigan (October 19, 1874 – December 13, 1932) was an American justice of the Supreme Court of Arizona from September 28, 1921 to January 1, 1923. Flanigan served as deputy district attorney for Cochise County.

Flanigan ran as the Republican nominee for Supreme Court Justice in 1920 and lost against Democratic incumbent Archibald G. McAlister. Governor Thomas Edward Campbell then appointed Flanigan to fill the vacancy caused by the death of Justice Albert C. Baker. Flanigan did not run for re-election and Frank H. Lyman won the 1922 election unopposed. He died in a traffic collision in 1932.
