= Edward M. Doe =

American lawyer and judge (1850–1919)

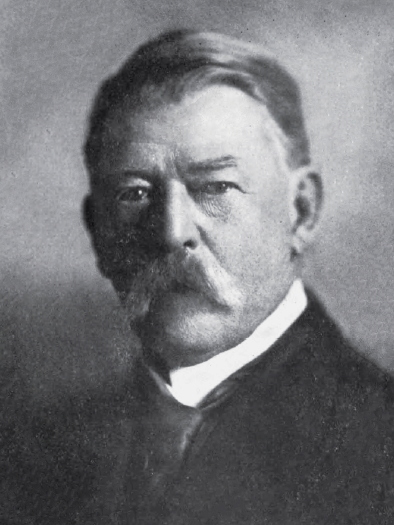

Associate Justice, Arizona Territorial Supreme Court
- In office May 27, 1909 – February 14, 1912
- Nominated by: William Howard Taft
- Preceded by: Richard E. Sloan
- Succeeded by: position eliminated due to Arizona statehood

Personal details
- Born: January 20, 1850 Cabot, Vermont
- Died: July 27, 1919 (aged 69) Flagstaff, Arizona
- Party: Republican
- Spouse: Lida Young (m. 1884)
- Profession: Attorney

Edward Madison Doe (January 20, 1850 – July 27, 1919) was an American jurist who served as an associate justice of the Arizona Territorial Supreme Court from 1909 till Arizona statehood in 1912.

== Biography ==
Doe was born to Dr. John and Lemira (Damon) Doe in Cabot, Vermont on January 20, 1850. During the early 1850s, his family moved to Iowa City, Iowa. Doe was educated in local schools before graduating from the State University of Iowa (now University of Iowa) in 1870. He received a Doctor of Law from the same institution in 1871. Doe was admitted to the Iowa bar the same year he received his law degree and practiced law in Iowa City. On June 5, 1884, Doe married Lida Young. Fraternally, he was a member of the Benevolent and Protective Order of Elks.

In 1885, Doe moved to Fort Worth, Texas. Two years later he moved to Prescott, Arizona Territory and formed a law partnership with W. G. Stewart. In Prescott, Doe quickly became a leader in the territorial bar association. With the creation of Coconino county in 1891, Governor John N. Irwin appointed Doe the county's first district attorney. The next year he was elected to a full term. Doe was narrowly defeated by Henry F. Ashurst in the 1904 and 1906 elections for the office. He was elected to another term as district attorney in 1908.

President William Howard Taft nominated Doe to replace Richard E. Sloan as an associate justice of the Arizona Territorial Supreme Court on May 8, 1909. He received Senate confirmation on May 18, and took his oath of office on May 27, 1909. He was assigned to the fourth district, covering Apache, Coconino, Mohave, Navajo, and Yavapai counties.

During his time on the territorial supreme court, Doe authored twelve opinions. His most influential opinion was in Shannon Copper Company v. Svendsen, 13 Arizona 111 (1910) which provided a precedent in matters dealing with corporations, contracts, and procedure. Three of his opinions dealt with criminal matters. He upheld murder convictions in Marquez v. Territory of Arizona, 13 Arizona 135 (1910) and Sharp v. Territory of Arizona, 13 Arizona 416 (1911). Schmidt v. Territory of Arizona, 13 Arizona 77 (1910) dealt with a gambling conviction. Railroads were a theme in several of Doe's decisions. Kroeger v. The Twin Buttes Railroad Company, 13 Arizona 348 (1911) dealt with the railroad's liability after a culvert they had built allegedly contributed to flooded which had damaged the plaintiff's property. In Southern Pacific Railroad c. Svendsen, 13 Arizona 111 (1910), the plaintiff claimed and was awarded damages for being thrown off a moving freight train. Cochchin v. El Paso & Southwestern Railroad Company, 13 Arizona 259 (1910) involved questions over the company's responsibilities for a watchman who was injured on the job. In other matters, Doe dealt with a bail request for an individual undergoing deportation proceedings under the Chinese Exclusion Act in Jung Goon Jow v. United States, 13 Arizona 255 (1910). Barnes v. Shattuck et al., 13 Arizona 338 (1911) began when former Justice William H. Barnes's widow attempted to collect legal fees owed to her late husband. The case eventually expanded to include the widow of former Chief Justice Webster Street who was in a similar position of attempting to collect unpaid legal fees. In Olney v. Bishop, 13 Arizona 336 (1911), Doe joined with the other members of the court in determining the court's practice of using a person's initials instead of their given name was acceptable but not ideal.

Politically, Doe was elected to represent Coconino County in Arizona's 1910 constitutional convention. He was a Republican candidate for a seat on the Arizona Supreme Court but failed to win a seat.

Doe's time on the bench ended with Arizona statehood on February 14, 1912. After leaving office, he returned to his private legal practice. His clients included the Arizona Central Bank, Babbitt Bros., the Saginaw & Manistee Lumber Company, and the Santa Fe Railroad. Doe died at his home on July 27, 1919. He was buried in Flagstaff's Citizens Cemetery.
