= John Lopez IV =

Vice Chief Justice of the Arizona Supreme Court (born 1968)

John Lopez
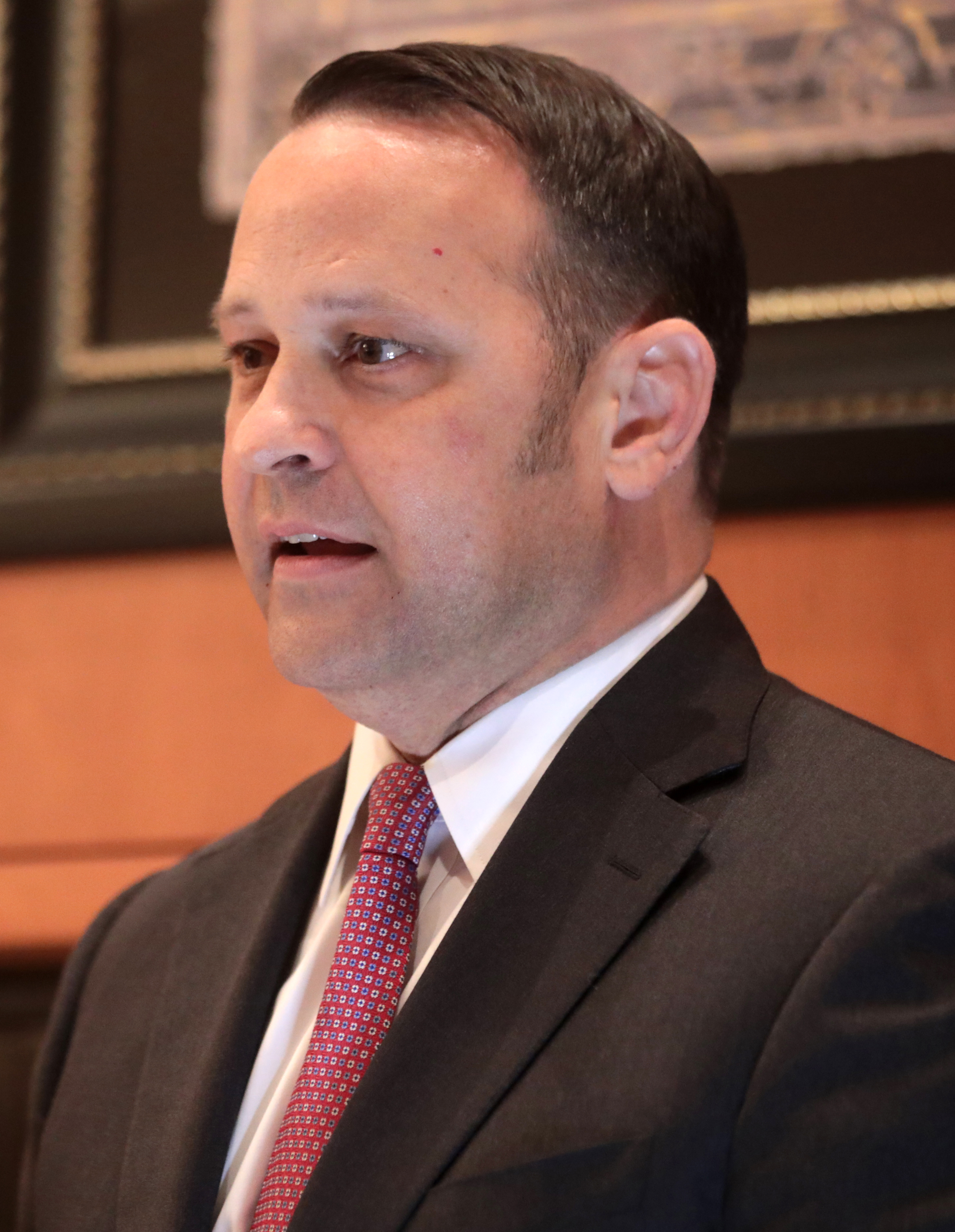

Vice Chief Justice of the Arizona Supreme Court
- Incumbent
- Assumed office July 1, 2024
- Preceded by: Ann Timmer

Justice of the Arizona Supreme Court
- Incumbent
- Assumed office December 19, 2016
- Appointed by: Doug Ducey
- Preceded by: Seat established

Personal details
- Born: 1968 (age 57–58)
- Party: Republican
- Education: University of Texas, Austin (BA); University of Chicago (attended); Arizona State University, Tempe (JD)

John R. Lopez IV (born 1968) is an American lawyer who has served as the vice chief justice of the Arizona Supreme Court since 2024. He concurrently has served as a justice of the court since 2016.

== Early life and education ==
Lopez received his bachelor's degree in political science and Middle Eastern studies from the University of Texas at Austin in 1992. After receiving his bachelor's degree, Lopez did graduate work in political science and Middle Eastern studies at the University of Chicago and graduated from the Arizona State University Sandra Day O'Connor College of Law in 1998. In law school, Lopez was an articles editor for the Arizona State Law Journal.

== Career ==
After law school Lopez clerked for Justice Charles Jones of the Arizona Supreme Court. He then worked at the law firm Bryan Cave as a commercial litigator.

Lopez worked for the United States Attorney's Office for more than 12 years, serving as an Executive Assistant United States Attorney, Chief Assistant, the Chief of Public Crimes and Public Integrity Section as well as Deputy Appellate Chief. He also served for six months as a legal advisor in Iraq consulting in the prosecution of Saddam Hussein. He served as the solicitor general for Arizona Attorney General Mark Brnovich immediately before his appointment to the Supreme Court.

=== Arizona Supreme Court ===
On November 28, 2016, Governor Doug Ducey announced the appointment of Lopez to the Arizona Supreme Court to a newly created seat. He was sworn into office on December 19, 2016.

In April 2024, Lopez authored a 4-2 decision in Planned Parenthood Arizona v. Mayes finding that the state's "territorial-era law outlawing abortion except to save the life of the mother is enforceable."

== See also ==
- List of Hispanic and Latino American jurists

Legal offices
| New seat | Justice of the Arizona Supreme Court; 2016–present | Incumbent |
