= James Duke Cameron =

American judge (1925–2003)

Chief Justice of the Arizona Supreme Court
- In office January 1975 – December 1979
- Preceded by: Jack D.H. Hays
- Succeeded by: Fred C. Struckmeyer Jr.

Justice of the Arizona Supreme Court
- In office January 4, 1971 – February 28, 1992
- Appointed by: Paul Fannin
- Preceded by: Ernest McFarland
- Succeeded by: Frederick J. Martone

Chairman of the Conference of Chief Justices
- In office 1978–1979
- Preceded by: C. William O'Neill
- Succeeded by: Lawrence W. I'Anson

Personal details
- Born: March 25, 1925 Richmond, California, U.S.
- Died: May 23, 2003 (aged 78)

James Duke Cameron (March 25, 1925 – May 23, 2003) was a justice of the Supreme Court of Arizona from January 4, 1971, to February 28, 1992. He served as chief justice from January 1975 to December 1975.

Born in Richmond, California, Cameron's family moved to Arizona in 1925. He served in the United States Army during World War II. Cameron later attended the University of California, Berkeley, graduating in 1950. Returning to Arizona he received his law degree from University of Arizona in 1954 and later earned an LL.M, from the University of Virginia in 1982. He entered private practice in Yuma after law school before becoming a Judge for the Superior Court in Yuma County, Arizona, where he served from 1960 to 1961. In 1965 he became a Judge on Court of Appeals, where he served until he was appointed to Supreme Court in 1971 by Governor Paul Fannin.

On the bench Cameron "gained a nationwide reputation as a judicial administrator." Cameron is the only Arizona chief justice to have served as chairman of the Conference of Chief Justices, which he did from 1978 to 1979. In 1986, President Ronald Reagan appointed Cameron to the Board of Directors of the State Justice Institute, where he served until 1994.

Cameron donated his legal papers to the Arizona Historical Society in 1992.

== Publications ==
- James Duke Cameron, Federal Review, Finalty of State Court Decisions, and a Proposal for a National Court of Appeals – A State Judge's Solution to a Continuing Problem, 1981 BYU L. Rev. 545 (1981).
