= William F. Fitzgerald =

American jurist (1846–1903)

- Fitzgerald c. 1898

17th Attorney General of California
- In office January 7, 1895 – January 2, 1899
- Governor: James Budd
- Preceded by: William H. H. Hart
- Succeeded by: Tirey L. Ford

Associate Justice of the California Supreme Court
- In office February 2, 1893 – January 7, 1895
- Appointed by: Henry Markham
- Preceded by: John R. Sharpstein
- Succeeded by: Jackson Temple

Associate Justice of the Arizona Territorial Supreme Court
- In office April 7, 1884 – October 31, 1885
- Appointed by: Chester A. Arthur
- Preceded by: A. W. Sheldon
- Succeeded by: William H. Barnes

Personal details
- Born: February 7, 1846 Jackson, Mississippi
- Died: May 12, 1903 (aged 57) Butte, Montana
- Party: Republican
- Profession: Attorney

William Francis Fitzgerald (February 7, 1846 – May 12, 1903) was an American jurist who served on the Federal bench as an associate justice of the Arizona Territorial Supreme Court, as well as at the state level as an associate justice of the California Supreme Court. Other positions he held include California Attorney General and judge of the Superior Court of Los Angeles County.

== Mississippi ==
Fitzgerald was born February 7, 1846, in Jackson, Mississippi. He was educated in his hometown's public schools until the age of 12 when his work as a newsboy prompted a patron to sponsor him into St. Mary's College (Kentucky). Fitzgerald attended the Kentucky school from late 1858 till the start of the American Civil War.

With the outbreak of hostilities, Fitzgerald enlisted in the Confederate States Army on March 27, 1861. He saw considerable action during the course of hostilities, participating in the Battle of Shiloh and being wounded at least once. A later account in the Vicksburg Daily Herald reported of the youth, "It was under the eye of the gallant Bod Smith that Fitzgerald, then a beardless stripling of seventeen, charged, with his gallant company, the impregnable Federal works, held by a large body of troops, strongly intrenched, with heavy siege guns, behind quadrilateral earthworks, and fell, sword in hand, pierced through the lungs, at the foot of the murderous parapet. He alone of his entire company succeeded in reaching the works." As a result of this action Fitzgerald received a battlefield promotion to first lieutenant.

Following the war, Fitzgerald began studying law and was admitted to the Mississippi bar on February 18, 1868. Upon obtaining his law license, he began practicing law in Jackson. Fitzgerald was twice married, both times to a daughter of Dr. C. S. Knapp of Jackson. As a result of his marriages, Fitzgerald fathered one daughter.

Politically, Fitzgerald broke with the Southern norm and joined the Republican party. He was twice elected to four-year terms as district attorney for the eleventh judicial circuit (containing area around both Jackson and Vicksburg) in 1878 and 1882. In July 1881, Fitzgerald received the Republican nomination for Mississippi Attorney General. Despite winning support from both the Greenbacks and Independent Democrats he failed to win the election. During the United States Senate elections of 1882, Fitzgerald was the Republican challenger to incumbent Lucius Quintus Cincinnatus Lamar.

== Arizona Territory ==
In February 1883, Fitzgerald represented the Vicksburg Cotton Exchange and Chamber of Commerce at the National Mississippi River Improvement convention in Washington D.C. During the convention, Fitzgerald met President Chester A. Arthur who asked if the Mississippi attorney would be interested in a Federal post. Fitzgerald requested a judgeship in Dakota Territory, a request that was repeated in December 1883.

On March 3, 1884, following the death of Justice A. W. Sheldon, President Arthur nominated Fitzgerald for a seat on the Arizona Territorial Supreme Court. Senate confirmation occurred a week later. He took his oath of office on April 7, 1884. Fitzgerald was assigned to judicial district one, consisting initially of Graham, Pima and Pinal counties and changed to Cochise, Graham, and Pima counties in 1885, and made his home in Tucson, Arizona Territory. Only a single ruling survives from his time on the Arizona bench, Smith v. County of Mohave, (1885) 2 Arizona 27. The one-page ruling determined that an 1881 act by the legislature did not remove the right to file suit against an Arizona county.

The inauguration of Grover Cleveland in 1885 signaled the end of Fitzgerald's time on the Arizona bench. The judge was popular among the territorial population and protest meetings were organized to fight the expected removal. Despite these efforts, President Cleveland named Fitzgerald's replacement, William H. Barnes, on October 23, 1885. Fitzgerald administered the oath of office to his successor on October 31, 1885.

== California ==
Fitzgerald moved to Los Angeles, California, in early 1886. There he worked briefly with Charles Silent at the legal firm of Silent, Wade, and Fitzgerald before joining the firm of Anderson, Fitzgerald, and Anderson. During this time he was active in the local legal community, helping perform an 1888 reorganization of the Los Angeles Bar Association. Outside his legal career, Fitzgerald served as chairman of the board for the Los Angeles Chamber of Commerce, director of the California Sewer Pipe Company, and was active in the state Republican party, being elected chairman of the party's central committee in 1892.

In 1891, Fitzgerald became a Supreme Court Commissioner. He held the position until his resignation in May 1892 when he joined the San Francisco legal firm of Estes, Fitzgerald, & Miller. On February 2, 1893, Governor Henry Markham appointed Fitzgerald to fill the seat on the California Supreme Court left empty by the death of Justice John Sharpstein. During the two years he served on the court, Fitzgerald authored thirty-two opinions.

Instead of running for reelection to the California Supreme Court, Fitzgerald became the Republican nominee for California Attorney General in 1884. He won the election and began a four-year term on January 7, 1895. As his term was set to expire, Fitzgerald ran on the Republican ticket and lost a close race for San Francisco city attorney. When he left office, Fitzgerald returned to his legal practice in San Francisco.

In late 1899, Governor Henry Gage appointed Fitzgerald to the Superior Court of Los Angeles County to fulfill the remaining term of a deceased judge. He held the position for two years, failing to win renomination for the 1902 elections. In April 1903, Fitzgerald traveled to Butte, Montana, to visit his daughter and son-in-law. There, on May 12, 1903, he died of heart failure. Fitzgerald was buried in Butte's Holy Cross Cemetery.

== Sources ==
- Goff, John S. (1975). Arizona Territorial Officials Volume I: The Supreme Court Justices 1863-1912. Cave Creek, Arizona: Black Mountain Press. OCLC 1622668.
- Rodman, Willoughby (1909). History of the bench and bar of southern California. Los Angeles: W. J. Porter. OCLC 4408734.
- Shuck, Oscar Tully (1901). History of the Bench and Bar of California. Los Angeles: Commercial Printing House. p. 688. OCLC 1725351.

== See also ==
- List of justices of the Supreme Court of California

Legal offices
Preceded by William H. H. Hart	California Attorney General; 1895–1899	Succeeded by Tirey L. Ford
Preceded by John R. Sharpstein	Associate Justice of the California Supreme Court; 1893–1895	Succeeded by Jackson Temple
