= Rebecca White Berch =

American judge (born 1955)

Chief Justice of the Arizona Supreme Court
- In office July 1, 2009 – June 27, 2014
- Preceded by: Ruth McGregor
- Succeeded by: Scott Bales

Justice of the Arizona Supreme Court
- In office April 2002 – September 2015
- Appointed by: Jane Dee Hull
- Preceded by: Frederick J. Martone
- Succeeded by: Clint Bolick

Personal details
- Born: Rebecca White; June 29, 1955 (age 71) Phoenix, Arizona, U.S.
- Party: Republican
- Spouse: Michael Allen Berch (m. 1981)
- Parents: Robert Eugene White (father); Janey Key Zimmerman (mother)
- Education: Arizona State University (JD)

Rebecca White Berch (born June 29, 1955) is a former justice of the Arizona Supreme Court. In July 2009, she began a five-year term as chief justice, a position to which she was elected by her peers on the court. As chief justice, she succeeded Ruth McGregor. She concluded her service as Arizona's chief justice in July 2014 when she passed the gavel to new Chief Justice Scott Bales. Berch had been a justice of the state's highest court since March 2002, when she was appointed to the court by Republican governor Jane Dee Hull. She retired in September 2015.

== Early life ==
Berch was born in Phoenix, Arizona, the daughter of Robert Eugene and Janet Kay (née Zimmerman) White. She married Michael Allen Berch on March 9, 1981. She earned a Bachelor of Science in 1976, a Juris Doctor in 1979 and a Master of Arts in 1990 all from Arizona State University.

== Professional career ==
Berch began her career as an associate and partner with the firm McGroder, Tryon, Heller, Rayes & Berch from 1979 to 1985 before serving as director of the legal writing program at the Arizona State University College of Law from 1986 to 1991 and 1994 to 1995. She served as solicitor general for the State of Arizona, from 1991 to 1994, as special counsel to the Arizona attorney general from 1995 to 1996 and as first assistant Arizona attorney general from 1996 to 1998.

Berch joined the bench as a judge on the Arizona Court of Appeals, Division I, from April 1998 to March 2002. She served as a justice of the Arizona Supreme Court from April 2002 to June 2005 before becoming vice chief justice in June 2005. Berch retired from the Supreme Court in September 2015.

== Awards and associations ==
=== Awards ===
- 2003 Rebecca White Berch Pro Bono Suite, Arizona State University College of Law
- 2002 Distinguished Achievement Award, Arizona State University College of Law
- 2002 Outstanding Alumnus, Arizona State University College of Liberal Arts and Sciences
- 2002 Professional Achievement and Contributions Award, Arizona Women Lawyers' Association
- 1999-2000 Outstanding Alumnus of the Year Award, Arizona State University College of Law
- 1998 General Appreciation Award, National Association of Attorneys
- 1998 Outstanding Service Award, Arizona Attorney General's Office
- 1994 Distinguished Service Award, Arizona State University College of Law
- 1992 Outstanding Attorney of the Year, Arizona Attorney General's Office
- 1992 Outstanding Service Award, Arizona Attorney General’s Office

=== Associations ===
- Chair, Arizona Commission on Appellate Court Appointments
- Board of Directors, US Conference of Chief Justices
- Former Chair, Commission on Technology
- Former Chair, Maricopa County Trial Court Appointments
- Member, Commission on Judicial Conduct
- Member, Judicial Ethics Advisory Committee
- Board of Trustees, National Conference of Bar Examiners
