= Alfred C. Lockwood =

American judge (1875–1951)

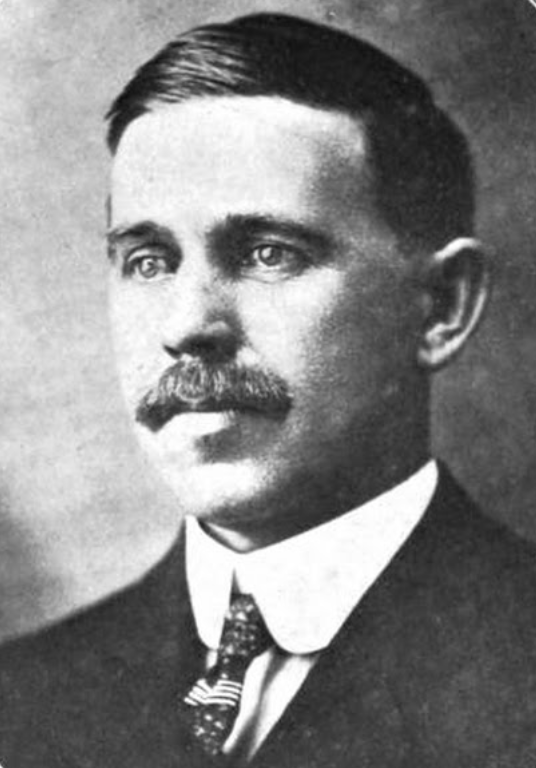
- Alfred Lockwood, circa 1913

Chief Justice of the Arizona Supreme Court
- In office January 1941 – December 1942
- Preceded by: Henry D. Ross
- Succeeded by: Archibald G. McAlister
- In office January 1935 – December 1936
- Preceded by: Henry D. Ross
- Succeeded by: Archibald G. McAlister
- In office January 1, 1929 – December 1930
- Preceded by: Henry D. Ross
- Succeeded by: Archibald G. McAlister

Justice of the Arizona Supreme Court
- In office January 5, 1925 – January 4, 1943
- Preceded by: Frank H. Lyman
- Succeeded by: Rawghlie Clement Stanford

Personal details
- Born: July 20, 1875 Ottawa, Illinois
- Died: October 29, 1951 (aged 76) Phoenix, Arizona
- Children: Lorna E. Lockwood

Alfred C. Lockwood (July 20, 1875 – October 29, 1951) was an American jurist and politician. Before his election to the Arizona Supreme Court, he served as a judge for the Superior Court of Cochise County.

Lockwood was born in Ottawa, Illinois. His father, W. C. Lockwood, was a native of Ohio, but for many years practiced law in Illinois, and became a prominent attorneys of that state. Lockwood's mother, Elizabeth Peers Lockwood, was also native of Illinois, and a descendant of Jonathan Edwards and Cotton Mather. Lockwood graduated from high school in Collinsville, Illinois, in 1891. He moved to Arizona in 1893 and for five years was employed as a teacher at the seminal school in Cave Creek. Lockwood was admitted to the Arizona Bar in 1902.

After he was admitted, he practiced in Nogales before moving to Douglas, where he entered private practice until he was appointed Judge of Cochise County by Governor George W. P. Hunt, in July, 1913, to succeed Judge Fred Sutter. At the time, Lockwood was one of the youngest judges in Arizona. Lockwood was elected three times as City Attorney in Douglas. Lockwood married to Miss Daisy M. Lincoln in Douglas on June 15, 1902, and they had 3 children. Lockwood's daughter, Lorna E. Lockwood, went on to serve as the first woman on the Arizona Supreme Court.
