= Robert J. Corcoran =

American judge (1934–2010)

Robert James Corcoran

Justice of the Arizona Supreme Court
- In office January 5, 1989 – April 26, 1996
- Preceded by: William A. Holohan
- Succeeded by: Charles E. Jones

Personal details
- Born: January 20, 1934 Queens, New York
- Died: July 27, 2010 (aged 76) Phoenix, Arizona
- Education: Fordham University

Robert James Corcoran (January 20, 1934 – July 27, 2010) was a justice of the Supreme Court of Arizona from January 5, 1989, to April 26, 1996.

== Early life and education ==
Corcoran born in 1934 in Queens, New York, to John Joseph Corcoran and Sarah (Slattery) Corcoran. Corcoran earned a Bachelor of Arts degree in history from Iona College in 1954 and his Juris Doctor from Fordham University in 1957. He earned an LLM from the University of Virginia in 1982. Shortly after moving to Phoenix, Corcoran met and married Joan Shields. They remained married until her death in 2002.

== Career ==
Corcoran started his legal career at Reid & Priest in New York City. Corcoran moved to Phoenix and joined the law firm of Lewis & Roca in 1959. A few years later, Corcoran joined the Maricopa County Attorney's Office as a criminal prosecutor, where he worked from 1962 to 1964. He later joined the firm of Dushoff & Sacks, which eventually became Dushoff, Sacks & Corcoran. While a partner there, Corcoran served as Arizona Counsel to the American Civil Liberties Union. In 1965, Corcoran was an initial attorney on the landmark constitutional law case Miranda vs. Arizona. As a result of his efforts in the Miranda case, Corcoran received the ACLU Civil Libertarian of the Year Award. Corcoran joined the firm Powers, Boutell, Fannin & Kurn in 1973. He left private practice in 1976 and was appointed to the Maricopa County Superior Court under Arizona's recently enacted Merit Selection System. He served on Superior Court for five years, until he was appointed to the Arizona Court of Appeals in 1981, where he served for seven years.

In 1989, Corcoran was sworn in as a justice of the Arizona Supreme Court, becoming the first of only two individuals appointed to all three levels of the Arizona state court system under Arizona's Merit Selection system. Corcoran often advocated for stricter discipline of judges and attorneys.

Corcoran retired from the court in 1996 and was succeeded by Charles E. Jones. One of Corcoran's favorite quotes, "where law ends, tyranny begins," was carved above the formal entrance to the Arizona State Courts Building when it was constructed in 1991. The inscription can be seen today above the North entrance to the court building.

Corcoran died on July 27, 2010, in Phoenix, Arizona, at the age of 76.
