= Dudley W. Windes =

American judge (1888–1972)

Justice of the Arizona Supreme Court
- In office January 5, 1953 – January 5, 1959
- Preceded by: Evo Anton DeConcini
- Succeeded by: Charles C. Bernstein

Personal details
- Born: August 24, 1888 Tempe, Arizona, U.S.
- Died: May 29, 1972 (aged 83) Mesa, Arizona, U.S.
- Education: Indiana University,

Charles Dudley Warner Windes (August 24, 1888 – May 19, 1972) was a justice of the Supreme Court of Arizona from January 13, 1952 to January 5, 1959.

Born to Romulus Adolphus Windes and Magadalene Ann Reid, Arizona's State Vital records accidentally listed Windes as a "female" at birth and omitted part of his name. Romulus Windes, was Arizona's first Baptist minister. Windes married Hope G. Anderson, they had three sons, Dudley, Honor and John. Windes studied law at Indiana University, graduating in 1914.

In 1915, Windes begins practicing law in Tempe. After taking a break from his law career during World War I to serve as American vice consul in Madrid, Spain, Windes returned to Tempe to continues practicing law until 1923, when he became a judge on the Maricopa County Superior Court, forcing him to move within the Phoenix city limits. He served as a judge until 1931, and was Special Assistant Attorney General from 1935 to 1937. Windes was elected to the Supreme Court in 1952. He did not seek re-election in 1958. Windes died on May 29, 1972.

He is buried in Double Butte Cemetery in Tempe, Arizona. His Tempe Home is now on the Tempe Historic Property Register.

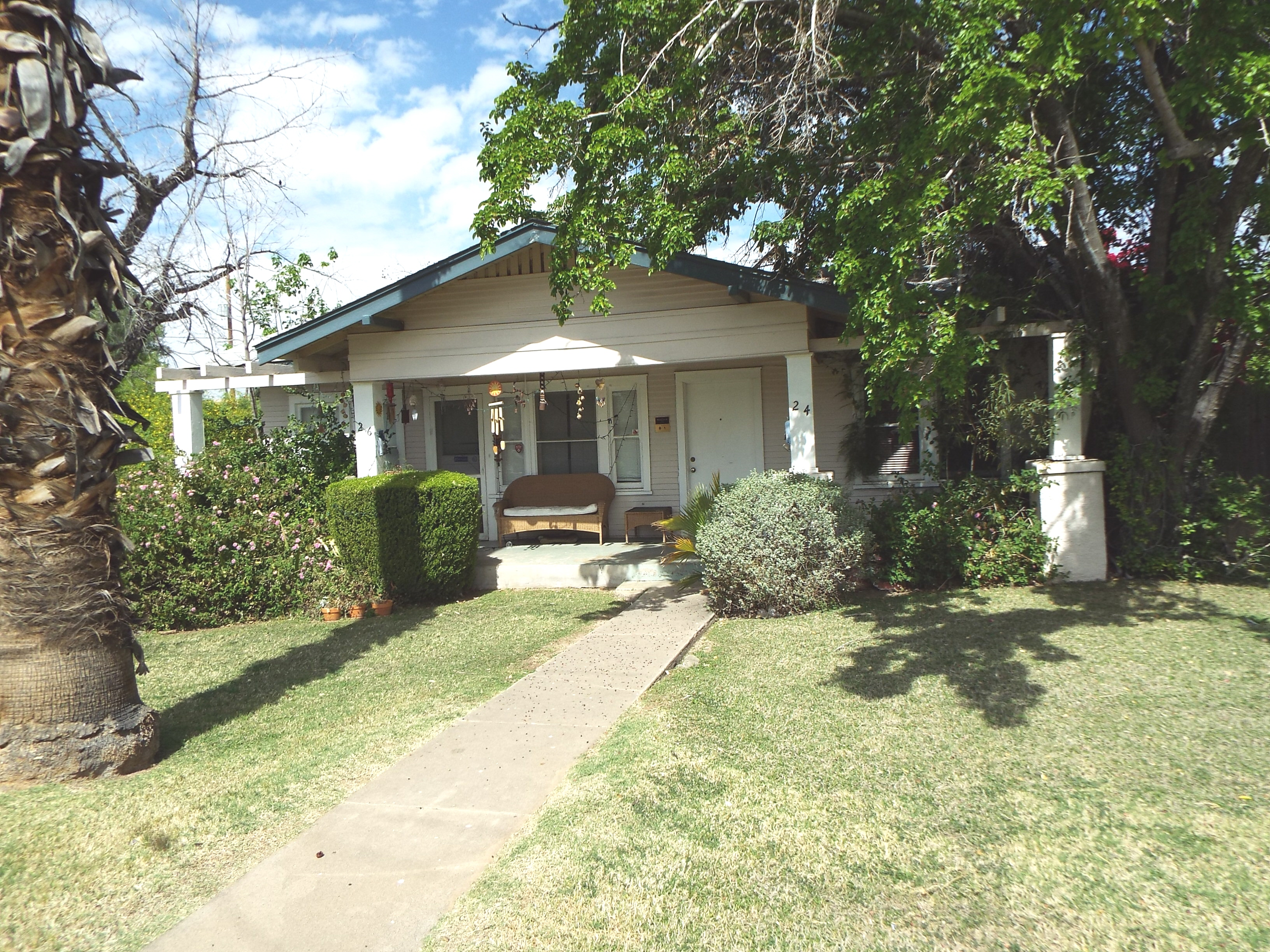
The Windes- Bell House was built in 1920 and is located at 24 9th Street in Tempe, Az.
