= James Moeller =

American jurist (1933–2019)

Justice of the Arizona Supreme Court
- In office February 23, 1987 – 1998
- Appointed by: Evan Mecham
- Preceded by: Jack D. H. Hays
- Succeeded by: Ruth V. McGregor

Personal details
- Born: November 14, 1933 Valley, Nebraska, U.S.
- Died: July 16, 2019 (aged 85) Phoenix, Arizona, U.S.
- Spouse: Nancy
- Children: 2

James Moeller (November 14, 1933 – July 16, 2019) was an American lawyer and jurist who served as a justice of the Arizona Supreme Court for eleven years from 1987 to 1998.

Moeller was a native of Valley, Nebraska. He graduated from Valley High School and received a Bachelor of Arts degree from Nebraska Wesleyan University in 1954. He served in the Army for two years after graduation. He received a law degree from George Washington University in Washington, D.C., in 1959 and joined the Phoenix law firm of Lewis, Roca, Scoville, Beauchamp and Linton. In 1970, Moeller formed his own Phoenix law firm. He was a judge of the Maricopa County Superior Court for the ten years prior to his appointment to the Supreme Court by Governor Evan Mecham.
