= Robert O. Lesher =

American judge (1921–2005)

Justice of the Arizona Supreme Court
- In office September 20, 1960 – December 12, 1960
- Preceded by: J. Mercer Johnson
- Succeeded by: Renz L. Jennings

Personal details
- Born: April 6, 1921 Phoenix, Arizona, U.S.
- Died: May 10, 2005 (aged 84) Tucson, Arizona, U.S.
- Party: Republican
- Education: University of Arizona
- Profession: lawyer

Robert Overton Lesher (April 6, 1921 – May 10, 2005) was a justice of the Supreme Court of Arizona from September 20, 1960, to December 12, 1960.

Lester attended University of Arizona for law school, graduating first in his class in 1949 alongside Mo Udall, Raul H. Castro and Samuel P. Goddard. Lesher took the Bar exam in July, 1949 and placed first among 60 candidates.

Governor Paul Fannin appointed Lesher to the court after J. Mercer Johnson resigned to return to private practice. At 39, Lesher was the youngest justice in the court's history. Barry Goldwater campaigned for Lesher during his reelection campaign. Lesher lost re-election to a full term to Democrat Renz L. Jennings, with Lesher getting 61,210 votes to Jennings' 96,824. He died on May 10, 2005.
