= J. Mercer Johnson =

American judge (1906–1988)

Justice of the Arizona Supreme Court
- In office September 16, 1957 – September 20, 1960
- Preceded by: Arthur T. LaPrade
- Succeeded by: Robert O. Lesher

Personal details
- Born: October 20, 1906 Naco, Arizona Territory, U.S.
- Died: December 17, 1988 (aged 82) Tucson, Arizona, U.S.
- Party: Democrat
- Spouse: Margaret Mary Blank (m. 1933)

John Mercer Johnson (October 20, 1906 – December 17, 1988) was a justice of the Supreme Court of Arizona from September 16, 1957 to September 20, 1960.

Born in Naco, Arizona Territory, Johnson ran for Pima County Attorney in 1936, losing in the primary election. Two years later, he became the Democratic nominee and won the position. He was reelected three times. Johnson became a Superior Court judge in 1946. He served in that position until becoming an Arizona Supreme Court Justice in 1957, appointed by Governor Ernest W. McFarland to fill the vacancy caused by the death of the late Justice Arthur T. LaPrade. He stepped down from the Court in 1960 to return to private practice. Johnson became a partner at the firm Johnson, Dowdall & Terry in Tucson. There, Johnson represented Conoco. He died on December 17, 1988.
