= Arthur T. LaPrade =

American judge (1895–1957)

Chief Justice of the Arizona Supreme Court
- In office January 1949 – December 1950
- In office January 1955 – December 1956
- Preceded by: Rawghlie Clement Stanford
- Succeeded by: Levi Stewart Udall

Justice of the Arizona Supreme Court
- In office January 1, 1945 – June 30, 1957
- Preceded by: Archibald G. McAlister
- Succeeded by: J. Mercer Johnson

6th Arizona Attorney General
- In office 1933–1935
- Governor: Benjamin Baker Moeur
- Preceded by: K. Berry Peterson
- Succeeded by: John L. Sullivan

Personal details
- Born: March 3, 1895 Winslow, Arizona
- Died: June 30, 1957 (aged 62) Phoenix, Arizona
- Party: Democrat

Arthur Thornton LaPrade (March 3, 1895 – June 30, 1957) was a justice of the Supreme Court of Arizona from January 1, 1945, until his death in 1957. He served as chief justice from January 1949 to December 1950 and from January 1955 to December 1956.

== Biography ==
LaPrade was raised in Winslow, Arizona, the son of Elizabeth "Lizzie" Dover (1858–1911) and Fernando Thornton "Ferd" LaPrade (1852–1936). The LaPrade family is credited with building the Winslow Opera House in Winslow, Arizona. LaPrade graduated from University of California at Berkeley and University of California Berkeley Law School in 1920. In 1923 he was Assistant Maricopa County Attorney and in 1925 he was appointed Maricopa County Attorney. Between 1933 and 1935 he was Arizona Attorney General and oversaw the conviction and sentence of Winnie Ruth Judd. From 1939 to 1945 LaPrade served as a Superior Court Judge. He was elected to the Supreme Court in 1947 and was Chief Justice twice. LaPrade married Lucile "Lucy" Hooper (1892–1983) and had four children, two of them went on to become attorneys. After his death on June 30, 1957, in Phoenix, LaPrade was buried in the Greenwood Memory Lawn Cemetery.
