= Donnell L. Cunningham =

American judge (1866–1947)

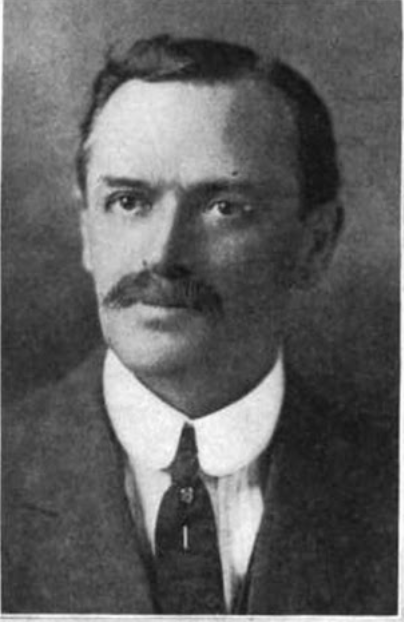
- Donnell L. Cunningham, circa 1913

Chief Justice of the Arizona Supreme Court
- In office January 1918 – December 1929
- Preceded by: Alfred Franklin
- Succeeded by: Henry D. Ross

Justice of the Arizona Supreme Court
- In office February 14, 1912 – January 4, 1921
- Preceded by: Position Established
- Succeeded by: Archibald G. McAlister

Personal details
- Born: April 21, 1866 Gaylesville, Alabama
- Died: March 24, 1947 (aged 80) Willcox, Arizona
- Party: Democrat

Donnell LaFayette Cunningham (April 21, 1866 – March 24, 1947) (sometimes referred to as Donald LaFayette Cunningham) was one of the original Justices of the Arizona Supreme Court, serving from February 14, 1912, to January 4, 1921. He served as chief justice from January 1918 to December 1929 and served as a member of Arizona's 1910 constitutional convention.

== Early life and education ==
Cunningham was born in Gaylesville, Alabama on April 21, 1866. He graduated from Gaylesville High School and read law with John L. Burnett, a leading attorney and future member of Congress from Alabama. Cunningham was admitted to practice law in Centre, Alabama on December 23, 1887.

== Career ==
In January 1888, Cunningham began to practice in Ashville, Alabama and was also editor of the "St. Clair Advance," a weekly newspaper. In February, 1889, he moved to Fort Payne and in 1893 to Colorado. He spent one year in Trinidad, then proceeded to Cripple Creek at the close of the "Bull Hill War." There he started a law practice, but after a few months took up mining and stock brokerage, and operated on the stock exchange. In April, 1896, the town was mostly destroyed by a fire. Cunningham lost everything in the fire except for a single office chair; he later accepted a position as a salesman in a grocery store.

In 1897, Cunningham traveled to the Blue Mountains in Utah, where he flipped a coin to decide whether to travel to Idaho or Arizona. Arizona won, and Cunningham reached Flagstaff on August 14, 1897. There, Cunningham worked as a laborer for several months before briefly moving to Phoenix before he returned to Flagstaff, where he was employed for a time in the lumber mills and in the District Attorney's office. His later moved to Williams, where he opened a law office and was elected first City Attorney, practicing there several years. In 1904, while practicing in Tombstone, Cunningham married Louisa Leavenworth. He served as District Attorney of Cochise County, and was a Democrat County delegate to the Arizona Constitutional Convention, where he chaired the Judiciary Committee. At the convention he worked to defeat propositions that were "designed to prevent judges from enjoining labor interests involved in disputes with employers." Cunningham, along with Albert Baker and Alfred Franklin, have been called the "fathers of article XVIII, section 5," of Arizona's Constitution, which provides that juries will determine matters of contributory negligence.

=== Supreme Court ===
Cunningham's election to the Supreme Court has become part of Arizona folklore. While Cochise County Attorney shortly before Arizona was admitted as a state, Cunningham made public his ambition to become judge of the superior court. Reputedly, those who feared he might be elected as their superior court judge prevailed upon him to instead seek election to the Arizona Supreme Court. Cunningham sought election to the supreme court position and surprised his detractors by succeeding.

Cunningham took his seat on the Court on February 14, 1912, the date Arizona entered the union. He served as chief justice from January 1918 until December 1929, when he was succeeded by Henry D. Ross. Cunningham retired from the Court on January 4, 1921, when he was replaced by Archibald G. McAlister.

== Death ==
Cunningham died in Willcox, Arizona on March 24, 1947.
