= Frank Gordon Jr. =

American judge (1929–2020)

Chief Justice of the Arizona Supreme Court
- In office January 1, 1987 – January 1, 1992
- Preceded by: William A. Holohan
- Succeeded by: Stanley G. Feldman

Justice of the Arizona Supreme Court
- In office September 16, 1975 – January 6, 1992
- Appointed by: Raul Castro
- Preceded by: Lorna E. Lockwood
- Succeeded by: Thomas A. Zlaket

Personal details
- Born: January 9, 1929 Chicago, Illinois, U.S.
- Died: January 6, 2020 (aged 90) Phoenix, Arizona, U.S.
- Spouse: Joan
- Children: three
- Education: Stanford University, University of Arizona School of Law

Frank X. Gordon Jr. (January 9, 1929 – January 6, 2020) was a justice of the Supreme Court of Arizona from September 16, 1975, to February 3, 1992. He served as chief justice from January 1987 to December 1992. Gordon was the first Supreme Court appointment under the new merit selection system, he was appointed by Governor Raul Castro.

Born in Chicago, Illinois, in 1929, Gordon received a Bachelor of Arts from Stanford University in 1951, and an LL.B. from the University of Arizona School of Law in 1954.

He was an associate with the law firm of Gordon and Gordon in Kingman, Arizona from 1954 to 1962, and became a judge of the Superior Court of Mohave County in 1962. He served in that office until his appointment to the Arizona Supreme Court in 1975. As Chief Justice of the Arizona Supreme Court, Gordon presided over the impeachment trial of then-Governor Evan Mecham in 1988. In 1990, Gordon received an American Bar Association Pro Bono Publico Award for his efforts on behalf of the poor through his stewardship of the Volunteer Lawyers Program of Phoenix.

Following Gordon's retirement from the court in 1992, United States District Judge Paul Gerhardt Rosenblatt appointed Gordon to mediate a dispute between various Native American tribes and the government of Arizona. In February 1993, Gordon ruled in favor of a proposal put forth by the tribes to allow them to operate slot machine casinos in their territories. He died on January 6, 2020, in Phoenix.
