= Scott Bales =

American judge (born 1956)

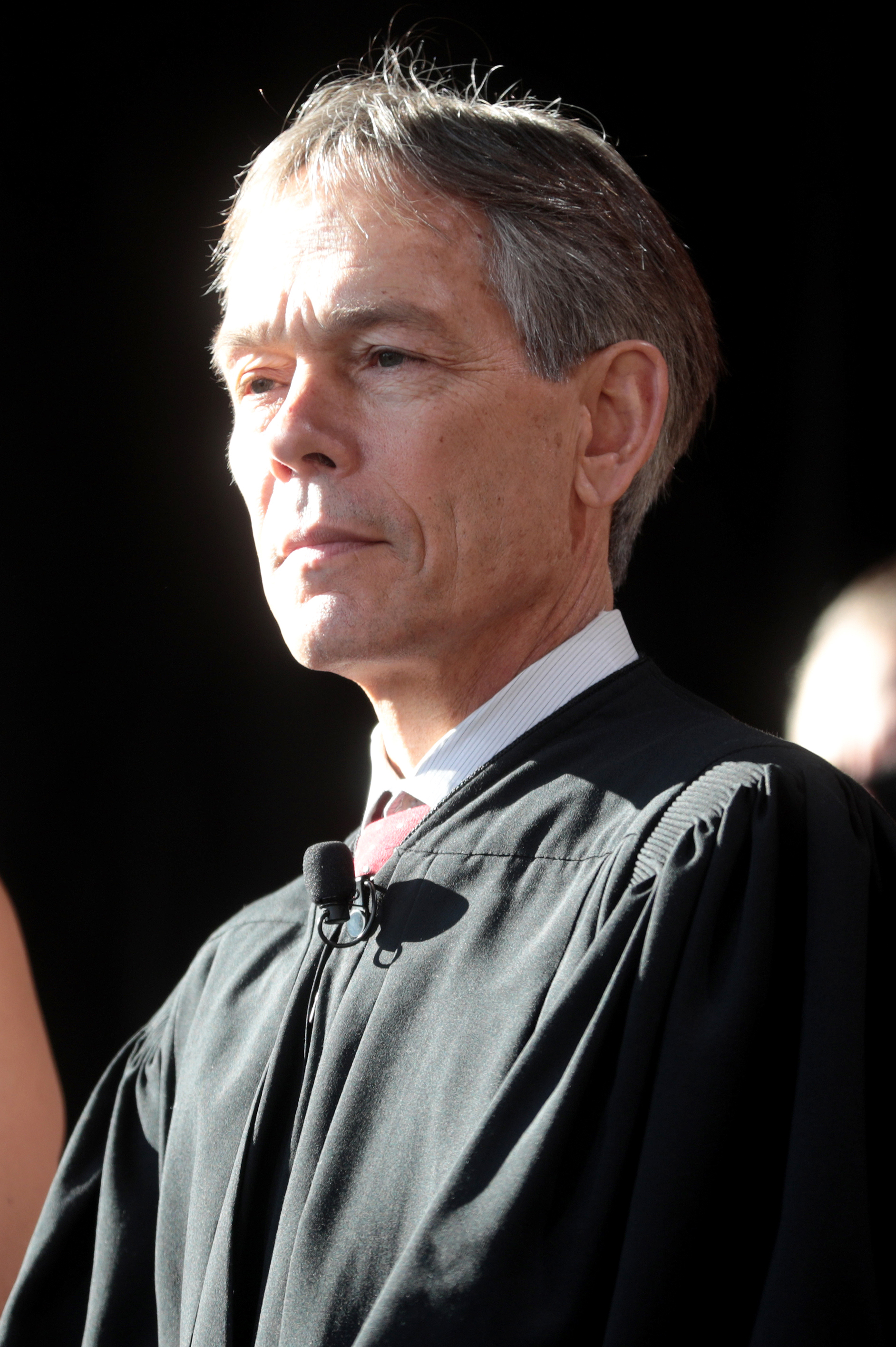

45th Chief Justice of the Arizona Supreme Court
- In office June 27, 2014 – July 1, 2019
- Preceded by: Rebecca White Berch
- Succeeded by: Robert M. Brutinel

Vice Chief Justice of the Arizona Supreme Court
- In office June 26, 2012 – June 26, 2014
- Preceded by: Andrew D. Hurwitz
- Succeeded by: John Pelander

Justice of the Arizona Supreme Court
- In office June 16, 2005 – July 31, 2019
- Appointed by: Janet Napolitano
- Preceded by: Charles Jones
- Succeeded by: Bill Montgomery

Personal details
- Born: July 20, 1956 (age 70) Elkhart, Indiana
- Party: Democratic
- Education: Michigan State University (BA); Harvard University (MA, JD)

William Scott Bales (born July 20, 1956) is the former Chief Justice of the Arizona Supreme Court. He was appointed to the court in 2005 by Governor Janet Napolitano through Arizona's merit selection system. He was elected by his fellow justices as Chief Justice of the Arizona Supreme Court, to replace Rebecca White Berch, effective June 27, 2014. Bales served as Arizona's chief justice until July 31, 2019.

== Early life and education ==
Bales was born in Elkhart, Indiana and grew up in White Pigeon, Michigan.

Following his 1974 graduation from White Pigeon High School, Bales graduated cum laude, Phi Beta Kappa, Phi Kappa Phi, and Omicron Delta Epsilon with a Bachelor of Arts from Michigan State University in 1978. He graduated from Harvard University with a Master of Arts in Economics in 1980. Bales earned his Juris Doctor, magna cum laude, from Harvard Law School in 1983. While at Harvard Law School, he was a member of the Board of Editors of the Harvard Law Review.

Following law school, Bales was law clerk for the Office of the Solicitor General in 1983. He went on to clerk for Joseph T. Sneed III of the United States Court of Appeals for the Ninth Circuit. From 1984 to 1985 he was clerk for associate justice Sandra Day O'Connor of the United States Supreme Court.

== Legal career ==
Following his clerkships, Bales was in private practice at the Phoenix law firm of Meyer, Hendricks, Victor, Osborn & Maledon from 1985 to 1994. He then served as an Assistant U.S. Attorney for the District of Arizona from 1995 to 1999, including service as Deputy Assistant Attorney General in the U.S. Department of Justice's Office of Policy Development from 1998 to 1999. Bales then served as Solicitor General for the State of Arizona from 1999 to 2001. He returned to private practice as a partner at Lewis and Roca from 2001 until his appointment to the Arizona Supreme Court in 2005.

== Judicial career and retirement ==
Bales was appointed to the Arizona Supreme Court on June 14, 2005 by Governor Janet Napolitano through Arizona's merit selection system. He was retained for a six-year term in 2008 with more than 77 percent of Arizona voters casting ballots in favor of his retention in office. Bales was elected by his fellow justices as Chief Justice of the Arizona Supreme Court, effective June 26, 2014, replacing Rebecca White Berch. He was once again retained by Arizona voters in 2014, receiving more than 73 percent of the vote. In 2016 Bales asked Arizona Governor Doug Ducey to veto a bill that added two justices to the state supreme court, arguing that the caseload did not justify the additional members. Bales retired from the Arizona Supreme Court on July 31, 2019.

After retiring from the bench Bales served as executive director of the Institute for the Advancement of the American Legal System (IAALS) at the University of Denver. On Sept. 5-6, 2019, Bales participated in a conference discussion at Duke Law School, along with several other state supreme court chief justices, on "problems stemming from the disproportionate impact of court fees, fines, and bail processes on poor and minority communities." In June 2020 Bales, along with Justice Demo Himonas of the Utah Supreme Court, argued in a Bloomberg Law editorial that states should experiment with new ways to give people access to the civil justice system that do not involve lawyers. Bales resigned his position with IAALS on July 31, 2020.

Bales was elected to the American Law Institute in 2007 and was elected to the ALI Council in 2014. He serves as an Adviser on the Principles of Election Law: Resolution of Election Disputes and was a consultant on the Restatement Third, Employment Law project. Bales is also a member of the Advisory Board for the O'Connor Justice Prize. During the 2020-2021 term Bales is chair of American Bar Association Section of Legal Education and Admissions to the Bar.

In 2018 Bales was named by the American Judges Association as the that year's recipient of the Chief Justice Richard W. Holmes Award of Merit, which recognizes "outstanding contributions to the judiciary." Bales also received the 2018 Ernest C. Friesen Award of Excellence, presented annually by the Justice Management Institute to an individual who has demonstrated vision, leadership, and sustained commitment to the achievement of excellence in the administration of justice.

== Notable decisions ==
In Cheatham v. DiCiccio, the Arizona Supreme Court upheld release time for a member of the police union against a challenge by the Goldwater Institute.

In the 2016 case State v. Holle, Bales and Justice Robert M. Brutinel dissented from the majority opinion and argued that under the majority's interpretation of the state's child molestation law, parents could be charged for simple acts like changing a diaper. Fordham University law professor John Pfaff wrote of the majority's decision, "If I owned a daycare center I'd be closing down and moving to another state." Holle was the court's third 3-2 decision during Bales's tenure as chief justice.

== Publications ==
- "Justice Sandra Day O'Connor: No Insurmountable Hurdles", 58 Stan. L. Rev. 1705 (2010).
- "On Teachers and Judges," 47 Arizona L. Rev. 867 (2005).
- "The Ninth Circuit: Should It Stay or Should It Go?," 34 U.C. Davis L. Rev. 379 (2000)
- "Turning the Microscope Back on Forensic Scientists", 26 Litigation 51 (Winter 2000).

== See also ==
- List of law clerks for the eighth seat of the Supreme Court of the United States

Legal offices
Preceded by Charles Jones	Justice of the Arizona Supreme Court; 2005–2019	Succeeded by Bill Montgomery
Preceded by Andrew D. Hurwitz	Vice Chief Justice of the Arizona Supreme Court; 2012–2014	Succeeded by John Pelander
Preceded by Rebecca White Berch	Chief Justice of the Arizona Supreme Court; 2014–2019	Succeeded by Robert M. Brutinel
