= Henry D. Ross =

American jurist (1861–1945)

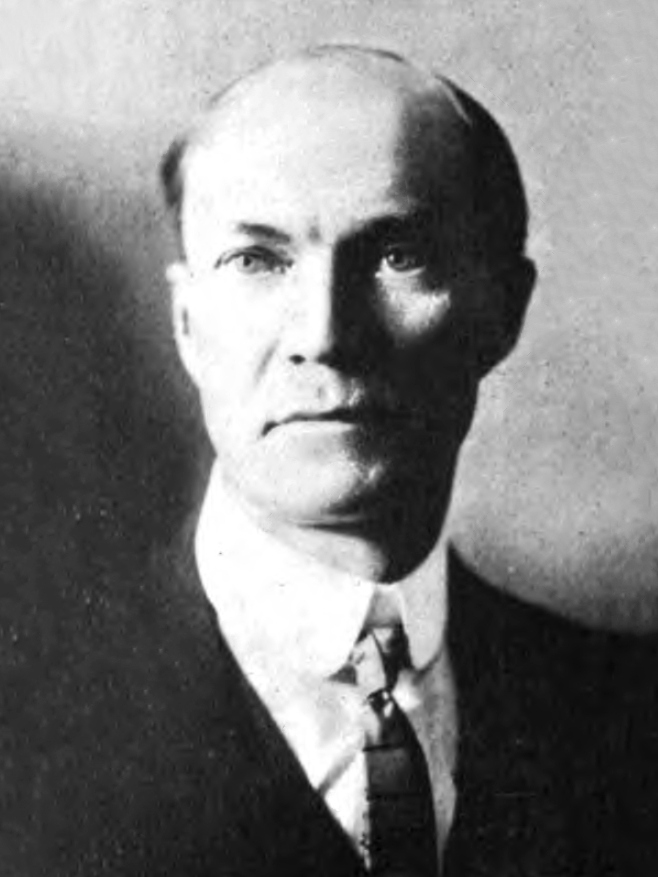
- Henry Ross, circa 1913

Chief Justice of the Arizona Supreme Court
- In office January 1945 – February 9, 1945
- Preceded by: Archibald G. McAlister
- Succeeded by: Rawghlie Clement Stanford
- In office January 1939 – December 1940
- Preceded by: Archibald G. McAlister
- Succeeded by: Alfred C. Lockwood
- In office January 1933 – December 1934
- Preceded by: Archibald G. McAlister
- Succeeded by: Alfred C. Lockwood
- In office January 1927 – December 1928
- Preceded by: Archibald G. McAlister
- Succeeded by: Alfred C. Lockwood
- In office January 1921 – December 1922
- Preceded by: Donnell L. Cunningham
- Succeeded by: Archibald G. McAlister
- In office January 1, 1915 – December 1916
- Preceded by: Alfred Franklin
- Succeeded by: Alfred Franklin

Justice of the Arizona Supreme Court
- In office February 14, 1912 – February 9, 1945
- Preceded by: seat created
- Succeeded by: Joseph H. Morgan

Personal details
- Born: September 12, 1861 Berryville, Arkansas
- Died: February 9, 1945 (aged 83) Phoenix, Arizona
- Spouse: Margaret Wheeler
- Profession: Attorney, jurist

Henry Davis Ross (September 12, 1861 – February 9, 1945) was an American jurist and politician. Before his election to the Arizona Supreme Court, he served as county attorney for both Coconino and Yavapai counties as well as a member of the Arizona Territorial Legislature. Following Arizona statehood, he served on the state's highest bench for 33 years and was selected chief justice on six occasions. Ross served the longest tenure in the court's history while his brother, John Wilson Ross, served the shortest.

== Biography ==
Ross was born on September 12, 1861, to Emily (Terrell) and William Henry Ross in Berryville, Arkansas. He grew up on his family's farm while attending the nearby Clark's Academy. Ross attended the University of Iowa and graduated with a Bachelor of Laws in 1883.

After graduation, Ross taught at a school in Arkansas before moving to Flagstaff, Arizona Territory in 1886. He continued to teach for another two years in Arizona. Among his students was future United States Senator Henry F. Ashurst.

Admission to the bar led Ross to begin practicing law in Flagstaff and Prescott. He married Margaret Wheeler of El Paso, Texas, on April 24, 1890. The marriage produced two sons, Henry David, Jr and John Wheeler.

Ross joined the Prescott legal firm of Ross & O'Sullivan in 1894, a partnership he continued until his ascension to the bench. He was elected to a two-year term as Yavapai County attorney in 1888. At the end of his term, Ross became county attorney for the newly created Coconino county. He then represented Coconino County as a member of the House during the 17th Arizona Territorial Legislature. Following his term in the legislature, he became Register for Prescott's land office. He won election for two more terms as Yavapai County attorney, in 1896 and 1908.

Promotion to the Arizona Supreme Court came to Ross on February 14, 1912. He won reelection to the post several times and held a seat on the court until his death. During his time on the court, Ross was noted for his work effort, averaging 50 decisions a year over a five-year period at a time when a justice of the Supreme Court of the United States averaged ten to twelve rulings a year. In January 1945, Ross informed friends that he intended to retire at the end of his final term in January 1947.

Ross died on February 9, 1945, following a stroke. The stroke occurred 8 days prior to his death and Ross failed to recover consciousness in the intervening time. He was buried at Phoenix's Greenwood Memorial Park.
