= Jack D. H. Hays =

American judge (1917–1995)

- Jack D. H. Hays, circa 1950

Chief Justice of the Arizona Supreme Court
- In office January 1972 – December 1974
- Preceded by: Fred C. Struckmeyer Jr.
- Succeeded by: James Duke Cameron

Justice of the Arizona Supreme Court
- In office January 4, 1969 – January 5, 1987
- Preceded by: Charles C. Bernstein
- Succeeded by: James Moeller

Personal details
- Born: February 17, 1917 Lund, Nevada, U.S.
- Died: June 18, 1995 (aged 78) Sedona, Arizona, U.S.
- Party: Republican

Jack D. H. Hays (February 17, 1917 – June 18, 1995) was a justice of the Supreme Court of Arizona from January 4, 1969 to January 5, 1987. He served as chief justice for three consecutive terms, from January 1972 to December 1974. At the time of his death, Hays still held the record for the most opinions authored by a justice in any single year (100).

== Biography ==
Hays graduated from Southern Methodist University Law in 1941.

In 1941 Hays enlisted in the United States Army. He was commissioned as an artillery officer, ultimately achieving the rank of Major. He served in combat in the Italian campaign during World War II. Before his overseas assignment he was stationed at Fort Huachuca. He returned to Arizona after the war and became a member of the Arizona bar in 1946.

In 1951, Hays worked as Assistant City Attorney for Phoenix. In 1952, while acting City Attorney, Hays worked to desegregate Sky Harbor Airport. In November 1952, Hays was elected to the Arizona House of Representatives as a Republican legislator from Maricopa County. He served in the 21st Arizona State Legislature from 1953 to 1954.

In 1954, Hays was an Assistant United States Attorney. Hays spent seven years as the United States Attorney for Arizona and ten years as a trial judge before being elevated to the Supreme Court. Hays was a noted conservative.

Hays's judicial career began in 1960 when Arizona Governor Paul Fannin appointed him to be a Maricopa County Superior Court Judge. During his time on the Superior Court, he was Maricopa County's only juvenile court judge.

Hays was elected to the Supreme Court in 1968, taking his seat on January 4, 1969. On the bench, Hays wrote a notable dissent in Grimm v. Board of Pardons & Paroles, writing, "Beware, oh unsuspecting trial judge, that when your decision to place a felon on probation goes horribly awry, the majority of my brothers sitting in cloistered ivory tower call your actions gross and subject you to the consequences thereof."

Hays supported Arizona's transition from elected judges to a merit selection system.

Harriet C. Babbitt clerked for Justice Hays.

== Works cited ==
- Holohan, William A.; Ehrlich, Susan A.; Strick, Gerald J. (Winter 1995). "Justice Jack D. H. Hays". Arizona Law Review. 37 (4): 951–954.
- Broomfield, Robert C. (1995). "Tribute to Jack D.H. Hays". Arizona State Law Journal. 27: 769.
