= Stanley G. Feldman =

American judge (born 1933)

Chief Justice of the Arizona Supreme Court
- In office January 1, 1992 – January 1, 1997
- Preceded by: Frank X. Gordon Jr.
- Succeeded by: Thomas A. Zlaket

Justice of the Arizona Supreme Court
- In office January 19, 1982 – 2002
- Appointed by: Bruce Babbitt
- Preceded by: Fred C. Struckmeyer Jr.
- Succeeded by: Andrew D. Hurwitz

Personal details
- Born: March 9, 1933 (age 93) New York City, U.S.
- Party: Democrat

Stanley George Feldman (born March 9, 1933) is an American lawyer and jurist who served as a member of the Arizona Supreme Court for twenty years from 1982 to 2002. He served as chief justice from 1992 to 1997.

Feldman was born in New York City and grew up in Tucson. He took his law degree at the University of Arizona. Feldman was President of the State Bar of Arizona in 1974.

Feldman was the second Arizona Supreme Court Justice to be appointed under Arizona's then-new merit-selection system. Over two decades, Feldman wrote over 400 majority opinions, "displaying an exceptional ability to forge consensus among his colleagues." Feldman was widely considered a liberal.

== See also ==
- List of Jewish American jurists
