= Thomas A. Zlaket =

American judge

Chief Justice of the Arizona Supreme Court
- In office January 1, 1997 – January 1, 2002
- Preceded by: Stanley G. Feldman
- Succeeded by: Charles E. Jones

Justice of the Arizona Supreme Court
- In office 1992–2002
- Appointed by: Fife Symington
- Preceded by: Frank X. Gordon Jr.
- Succeeded by: Michael D. Ryan

Personal details
- Born: Thomas Andrew Zlaket; May 30, 1941 (age 85) Ontario, California, U.S.
- Party: Republican
- Spouse: Gloria E. Zlaket
- Education: University of Notre Dame (BA); University of Arizona (LLB); University of Virginia (LLM)

Thomas Andrew Zlaket (born May 30, 1941) is an American lawyer and jurist who served as a justice of the Arizona Supreme Court from 1992 to 2002 and as the chief justice of the court from 1997 to 2002.

== Education ==
Zlaket received his bachelor's degree from University of Notre Dame in 1962, his LL.B. from University of Arizona in 1965 and an LL.M. in Judicial Process from University of Virginia in 2002.

== Career ==
He was president of the Arizona State Bar in 1988 and 1989. For 27 years, Zlaket practiced law in Tucson for several firms, including with his brother, Eugene, for Zlaket & Zlaket. He was also a judge pro-tem at Pima County Superior Court.

Zlaket was widely praised for his struggle to make the court system accessible. He is regarded as the principal author or advocate of Rule 26.1 of the Arizona Rules of Civil Procedure (relating to prompt disclosure of information in civil actions). Rule 26.1 of the Arizona Rules of Civil Procedure and similar rules requiring disclosure have been criticized as making civil litigation more burdensome and complex in that they frontload the expense of litigation and make it less likely that the parties will agree to an early settlement of the case.

After leaving the bench, Zlaket returned to private practice and later served as an Adjunct Assistant Professor at the University of Arizona. As of 2018 he is no longer a professor at the university.
