= Ruth McGregor =

American judge

Ruth V. McGregor

Chief Justice of the Arizona Supreme Court
- In office June 12, 2005 – July 1, 2009
- Preceded by: Charles E. Jones
- Succeeded by: Rebecca White Berch

Justice of the Arizona Supreme Court
- In office 1998 – July 1, 2009
- Appointed by: Jane Dee Hull
- Preceded by: James Moeller
- Succeeded by: John Pelander

Personal details
- Born: April 4, 1943 (age 83) Le Mars, Iowa, U.S.
- Education: University of Iowa (BA, MA) Sandra Day O'Connor College of Law (JD)

Ruth Van Roekel McGregor (born April 4, 1943) is an American lawyer and former justice of the Arizona Supreme Court.

== Legal education and experience ==
McGregor received a Bachelor of Arts from the University of Iowa in 1964, a Master of Arts from the University of Iowa in 1965, and her Juris Doctor from the Sandra Day O'Connor College of Law at Arizona State University 1974.

== Judicial career ==
McGregor served as law clerk to Supreme Court of the United States justice Sandra Day O'Connor from 1981 to 1982 and served on the Arizona Court of Appeals from 1989 to 1998.

McGregor was appointed to the Arizona Supreme Court in 1998 by Governor Jane Dee Hull and remained there until her retirement in 2009. She was retained in 2000 and 2006. She served a term as chief justice that ended with her retirement from the court. She retired from the court on June 30, 2009, and was succeeded by John Pelander.

McGregor is an advocate of Arizona's version of the Missouri Plan for choosing state judges.

== See also ==
- List of law clerks for the eighth seat of the Supreme Court of the United States
