= Joseph H. Morgan =

American judge (1884–1967)

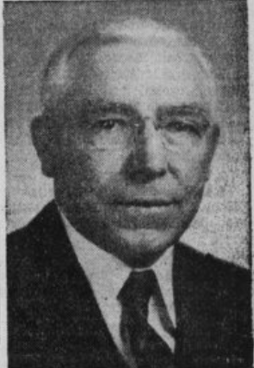

Justice of the Arizona Supreme Court
- In office February 13, 1945 – January 6, 1947
- Preceded by: Henry D. Ross
- Succeeded by: Levi Stewart Udall

Personal details
- Born: July 23, 1884
- Died: October 30, 1967 (aged 83) Phoenix, Arizona, US
- Education: University of Nebraska

Joseph Harvey Morgan (July 23, 1884 – October 30, 1967) was a justice of the Supreme Court of Arizona from February 13, 1945, to January 6, 1947.

Morgan graduated from the University of Nebraska College of Law in 1910. In that year he married Theola Linn of North Bend, Nebraska. The couple moved to Prescott, Arizona and Morgan was admitted to the Arizona bar in 1910. The couple had 4 children. He served as assistant Yavapai County attorney. Morgan was "active in Boy Scout work, member of the Prescott Rotary club, and is a former regent of the University of Arizona". Morgan was appointed to fill a vacancy on the Arizona Supreme Court, caused by the death of Henry D. Ross, on February 13, 1945. He sought election to a full term in 1946, losing in the primary to Levi Stewart Udall by 3150 votes. Harvey was involved with the Democratic Party. He died at a nursing home in Phoenix, Arizona.
