= Michael D. Ryan =

American judge (1945–2012)

Justice of the Arizona Supreme Court
- In office 2002–2010
- Appointed by: Jane Dee Hull
- Preceded by: Thomas A. Zlaket
- Succeeded by: Robert M. Brutinel

Personal details
- Born: August 3, 1945 San Diego, California, U.S.
- Died: January 30, 2012 (aged 66) Phoenix, Arizona, U.S.
- Party: Republican
- Education: College of Saint Benedict and Saint John's University (BA); Arizona State University (JD)
- Profession: Politician; Lawyer

Military service
- Branch/service: United States Marine Corps
- Rank: First lieutenant

Michael D. Ryan (August 3, 1945 – January 30, 2012) was a justice of the Arizona Supreme Court, a position he had held 2002–2010. He was also a veteran of the Vietnam War.

Ryan announced in June 2010 that he was stepping down from the court effective August 6, 2010. He died from a heart attack on January 30, 2012, at the age of 66.

== Education ==
Born at Balboa Naval Hospital in San Diego, California, Ryan received a Bachelor of Arts from Saint John's University, in Minnesota in 1967. Ten years later, he earned a Juris Doctor from Arizona State University Law School (now Sandra Day O'Connor College of Law).

== Military experience ==
After graduating from college, Ryan enrolled in the United States Marine Corps. While in the service, he served as a platoon commander and achieved a rank of First Lieutenant. As a result of wounds sustained in battle, Ryan received a Medical Retirement in February 1969. Accordingly, he was awarded two Purple Heart medals, in addition to a Bronze Star for actions in combat.

== Professional career ==
After his discharge from the USMC, Ryan took a job in the Maricopa County Attorney's Office, as Deputy County Attorney. There he served in the Major Felony Bureau and held the position of co-coordinator of the county's sex crimes unit. He stayed at Maricopa Country Attorney's Office for eight years, starting in October 1977 and ending in October 1985.

After leaving the County Attorney's Office, Ryan served as a full-time judge pro tempore for the Maricopa County Superior Court, a position he held for a little over a year and a half, In June 1986, he was appointed a full-time judge by the Governor. He served on the court for ten years. For his last three years, he also acted as an Associate Criminal presiding judge. While a judge, Ryan presided over the criminal trial of former Governor Evan Mecham. Ryan was appointed on September 11, 1996, to the Arizona Court of Appeals by Fife Symington III.

Ryan was appointed to the state's highest court on May 21, 2002, by Governor Jane Dee Hull.

During his time on the court, Ryan never authored nor joined a dissenting opinion.

== Awards and associations ==
- 2005 State Bar of Arizona's James A. Walsh Outstanding Jurist Award
- 2003 Arizona State University College of Law's Outstanding Alumnus Award
- 2003 Arizona State University College of Law's Distinguished Achievement Award
- 2001 Semper Fi award, Phoenix Chapter, First Marine Division Association
- 2001 Judicial Award of Excellence for outstanding dedication and commitment to improving the justice system, State Bar of Arizona, Public Lawyers Section
- 2001 Honorable Henry S. Stevens Judge of the Year Award for outstanding service to improve the legal system, legal profession and professionalism of the bench and bar, Maricopa County Bar Association
- 1999–2000 Board of Directors' Member of the Year, Maricopa County Bar Association
