= William H. Barnes (jurist) =

American jurist from Arizona (1843–1904)

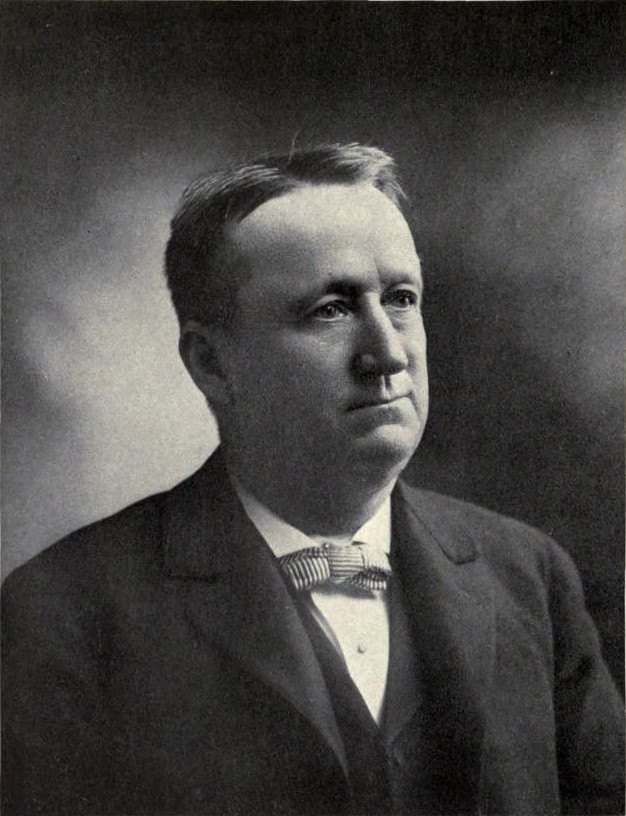

Associate Justice, Arizona Territorial Supreme Court
- In office October 31, 1885 – November 2, 1889
- Nominated by: Grover Cleveland
- Preceded by: William F. Fitzgerald
- Succeeded by: Richard Elihu Sloan

Personal details
- Born: May 14, 1843 Hampton, Connecticut
- Died: November 10, 1904 (aged 61) Tucson, Arizona Territory
- Party: Democratic
- Spouse: Belle Jane Daily
- Profession: Attorney

William Henry Barnes (May 14, 1843 – November 10, 1904) was an American jurist who served as Assistant Justice on the Arizona Territorial Supreme Court from 1885 till 1889.

== Background ==
Barnes was born on May 14, 1843, in Hampton, Connecticut, to Eunice A. (Hubbard) and William Barnes. His father was a Yale-educated Presbyterian minister while his mother was related to Nathan Hale. The family moved to Alton, Illinois, when Barnes was 10. There, he was educated in public schools before graduating from Illinois College. After receiving his Bachelor of Arts, Barnes studied law at the University of Michigan where he graduated in 1865. He was admitted to the Illinois bar the next year. After leaving school he established a legal practice in Jacksonville, Illinois, where he specialized in corporate law. Among his clients was the Wabash Railroad. During the early 1860s he married Belle Jane Daily. The union produced one daughter, Josephine. Barnes' fraternal commitments included the Freemasons, Independent Order of Odd Fellows, and Benevolent and Protective Order of Elks

In Jacksonville, Barnes became active in Democratic party politics. From 1865 till 1885, he was a delegate to the party's state convention. Barnes was a delegate to the Illinois constitutional convention in 1870 and represented Morgan County in the Illinois General Assembly, in the Illinois House of Representatives, in 1872. He also represented Illinois at the 1876, 1880, and 1884 Democratic National Convention.

== Associate Justice ==
After President Grover Cleveland was inaugurated, Adlai Stevenson I, Lyman Trumbull, and other members of the Illinois congressional delegation recommended Barnes for a territorial judgeship. The president acted upon these recommendations and gave Barnes a recess appointment on October 23, 1885. He arrived and took his oath of office on October 31, 1885. The new Associate Justice was assigned to Arizona Territory's first district, comprising Cochise, Graham, and Pima counties. Barnes moved to Tucson where he lived for the rest of his life. Senate confirmation of his appointment came on May 28, 1886.

A number of his decisions survive from Barnes' time on the bench. While dealing with tax matters, Bares ruled in Atlantic & Pacific Railroad Company v. Leseur (1888), 2 Arizona 428 that the power to tax that was given to the territory by the federal government was to be liberally construed and that for property to be exempt from said taxation it required a specific exemption. He reiterated this ruling in Territory of Arizona v. Delinquent Tax List (1889), 3 Arizona 177, adding that the territory's district courts did not have the authority to determine if tax rates were excessive, but could only intervene judicially in cases of fraud. Dealing with property rights, Barnes rules in Stiles v. Lord (1886), 2 Arizona 154, that an 1871 statute granting control of separately owned property to married women did not grant rights beyond those specified by the law. He added additional detail to this ruling in Woffenden v. Charouleau (1886), 2 Arizona 91 when he determined the law applied to legal rulings dating back to 1876 under the principle of stare decisis.

Barnes dealt with several procedural issues as a judge. In Johnson v. Tully (1887), 2 Arizona 223, he ruled that because the plaintiff had agreed to a settlement of $4,304.93 in a suit before the Arizona Territorial Supreme Court, he had given up the option of further appeal to the Supreme Court of the United States which required a minimum contested sum of $5,000 in any appealed dispute. In Bryan v. Pinney (1888), 2 Arizona 390, Barnes ruled that adjourned terms of the territorial supreme court were not continuations of the previous term but were instead separate and distinct sessions. Finally, Barnes wrote in Insane Asylum v. Wolfley (1889), 3 Arizona 132, which dealt with a writ of mandamus that "The court ought not to issue the writ unless it is prepared to enforce (it)."

One of the final issues Barnes dealt with from the bench was the Wham Paymaster Robbery. A call for the judge's removal was sent to the Department of Justice after he reduced the defendant's bail from $15,000 to $10,000. This was followed by a dispute developing between Barnes and the grand jury investigating the case. The dispute resulted in a telegram being sent by the jury foreman to the Attorney General claiming that Barnes was exerting inappropriate influence upon government witnesses. Upon learning of the telegram, Judge Barnes dismissed the Grand Jury, calling them "a band of character assassins, unworthy to sit in any court of justice." The grand jury's telegram did not factor into the official reason for Barnes' removal. The Department of Justice instead cited the fact that Barnes had accepted $900/year in pay from the territorial treasury on top of the $3000/year salary offered by the Federal government. The practice of the territory offering extra pay to judges assigned to the Arizona Territorial Supreme Court had begun in 1875 but the Federal government still felt it was illegal for the judges to accept the extra salary. On October 17, 1889, a couple weeks after the telegram was sent, President Benjamin Harrison nominated Richard Elihu Sloan as Barnes' replacement. Sloan took the oath of office on November 2, 1889.

== Later life ==
After leaving the bench, Barnes returned to private legal practice. Toward this end he joined with John H. Martin to form the firm of Barnes & Martin. In 1893, Charles Crocker hired the firm to represent the Southern Pacific Railroad. Another major client was William C. Greene and the Greene Consolidated Copper Company. Barnes' other business interests included the Cieneguita Copper Company, of which he became president.

In 1895, Barnes became the second president of the Arizona Bar Association, a position he held for two years. After the 16th Arizona Territorial Legislature authorized a constitutional convention in 1891, Barnes was selected as one of 22 delegates. The next year he represented Arizona Territory at the 1892 Democratic National Convention. In November 1894, Barnes became a special assistant United States Attorney for Arizona. A supporter of the Democratic party most of his life, Barnes altered his political support to endorse Republican Teddy Roosevelt in September 1904.

Barnes died in his home around 9:00 pm on November 10, 1904, after becoming suddenly ill. He was buried in Tucson's Evergreen Cemetery.
