= Bill Montgomery (Arizona attorney) =

American judge (born 1967)

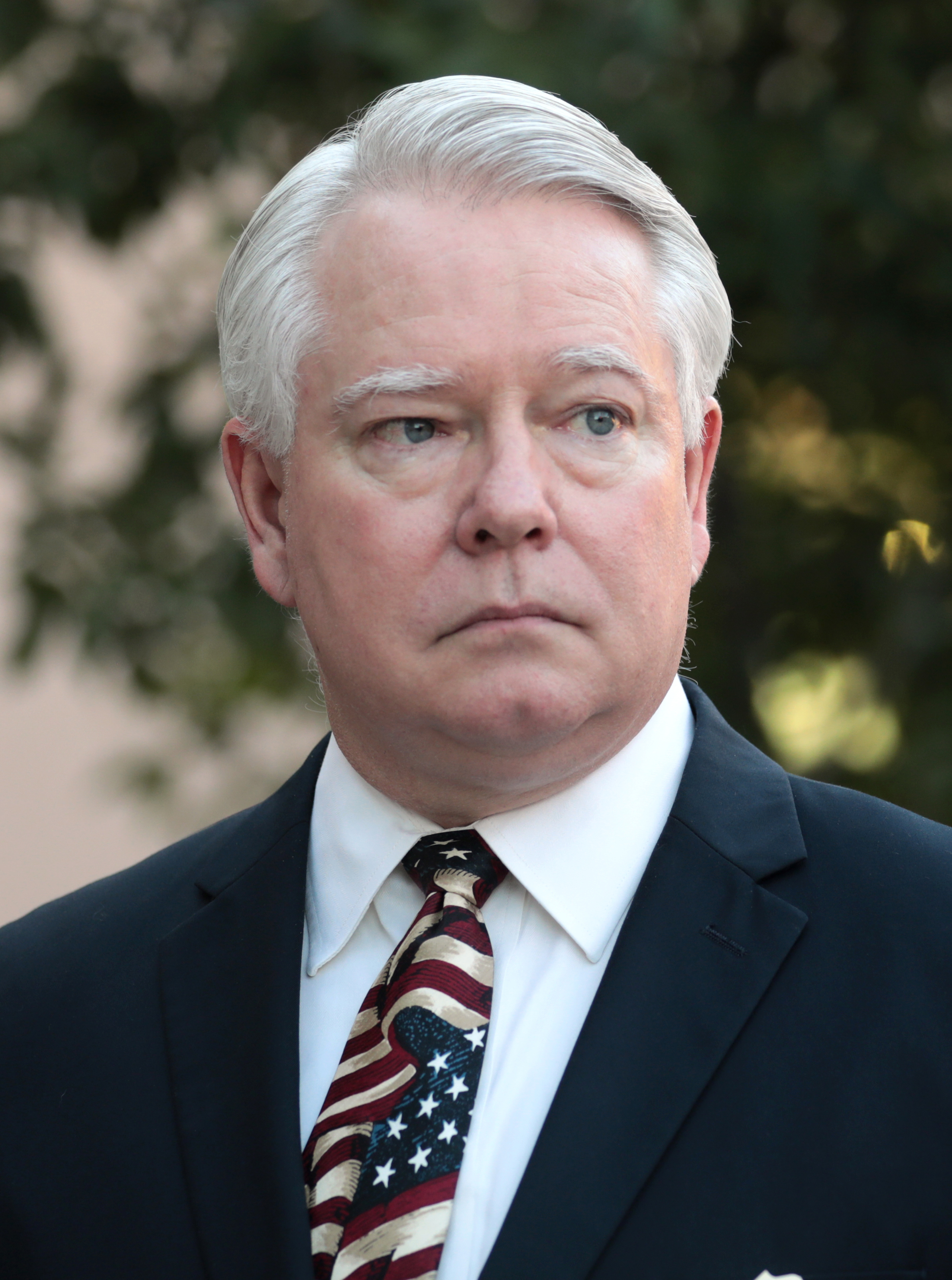

Justice of the Arizona Supreme Court
- Incumbent
- Assumed office September 6, 2019
- Appointed by: Doug Ducey
- Preceded by: Scott Bales

28th County Attorney of Maricopa County
- In office November 22, 2010 – September 5, 2019
- Preceded by: Rick Romley (acting)
- Succeeded by: Rachel Mitchell (acting)

Personal details
- Born: March 2, 1967 (age 59) Lynwood, California, U.S.
- Party: Republican
- Education: United States Military Academy (BS); Arizona State University, Tempe (JD)

Military service
- Allegiance: United States
- Branch/service: United States Army
- Years of service: 1985–1995
- Rank: Captain
- Battles/wars: Gulf War (Iraq)

William Gerard Montgomery (born March 2, 1967) is an American attorney who has been a justice of the Arizona Supreme Court since September 2019. He previously was the County Attorney for Maricopa County, Arizona, from 2010 to 2019.

== Early life and education ==
Montgomery is a West Point graduate and a Gulf War veteran. Commissioned as a second lieutenant, he served six and a half years of active duty in the United States Army, including as a tank commander in the first Gulf War in Iraq, ending his service as a captain.

== Career ==
During Montgomery's tenure, the county attorney's office gained national recognition for its Restitution Specialist and Sex Assault Backlog programs.

While County Attorney, Montgomery called for written protocols to address use of force incidents and served as the Arizona State Director for the National District Attorneys Association.

In August 2019, attorneys for Jodi Arias filed an ethics complaint against Montgomery, claiming he covered up misconduct and harassment by Juan Martinez, the lead prosecutor on the case. The complaint was later dismissed following a nearly 14-month screening process by the State Bar that found no evidence of any misconduct by Montgomery.

== Elections ==
=== Arizona Attorney General ===
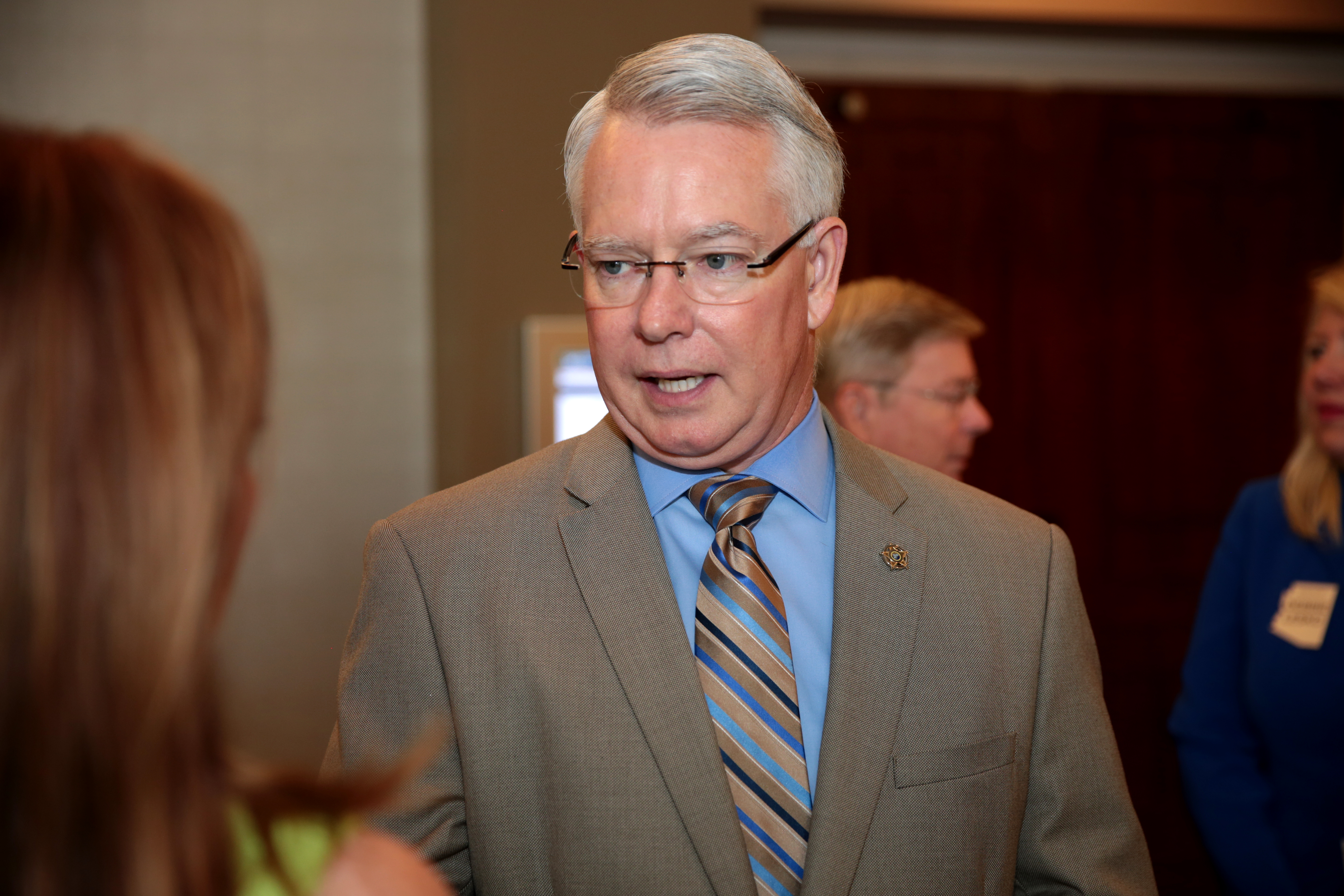
Montgomery at an event in Phoenix, Arizona

In 2006, Montgomery ran for Arizona Attorney General, losing to incumbent Terry Goddard.

=== Maricopa County Attorney ===
In the 2010 special election to replace Andrew Thomas, who resigned to run for Arizona Attorney General, Montgomery defeated interim county attorney Rick Romley in the Republican primary. Montgomery went on to defeat Libertarian Michael Kielsky in the general election.

Montgomery won election to a full term in 2012 in a rematch against Kielsky. He won re-election again in 2016 against Democrat Diego Rodriguez

=== Arizona Supreme Court appointment ===
In January 2019, Montgomery applied for an appointment to a vacancy in the Arizona Supreme Court. The commission did not pass Montgomery's name to the governor, which is required for a judicial apportionment, citing "concerns over the pattern of misconduct at the Maricopa County Attorney's Office and a lack of relevant professional experience".

In June 2019, Montgomery applied for a second vacancy on the Arizona Supreme Court. This time, after Governor Doug Ducey replaced several members of the state judicial nominating commission, Montgomery's name was sent to the governor, who selected him for the supreme court seat on September 4, 2019. Montgomery was sworn into office on September 6, 2019.

Legal offices
Preceded by Scott Bales	Justice of the Arizona Supreme Court; 2019–present	Incumbent
