= Archibald G. McAlister =

American judge (1873–1950)

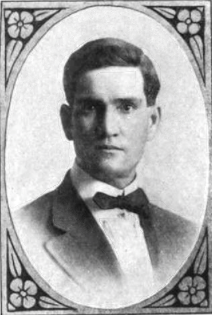
- Archibald McAlister, circa 1913

Chief Justice of the Arizona Supreme Court
- In office January 1943 – December 1944
- Preceded by: Alfred C. Lockwood
- Succeeded by: Henry D. Ross
- In office January 1937 – December 1938
- Preceded by: Alfred C. Lockwood
- Succeeded by: Henry D. Ross
- In office January 1931 – December 1932
- Preceded by: Alfred C. Lockwood
- Succeeded by: Henry D. Ross
- In office January 1, 1923 – December 1926
- Preceded by: Henry D. Ross
- Succeeded by: Henry D. Ross

Justice of the Arizona Supreme Court
- In office January 4, 1921 – January 1, 1945
- Preceded by: Donnell L. Cunningham
- Succeeded by: Arthur T. LaPrade

Personal details
- Born: September 23, 1873 Tatum, South Carolina, U.S.
- Died: June 3, 1950 (aged 76) Phoenix, Arizona, U.S.

Archibald Gilbert McAlister (September 23, 1873 – June 3, 1950) was an American jurist and politician. Before his election to the Arizona Supreme Court, he served as a judge for the Superior Court of Graham County.

McAlister was born in Tatum, South Carolina. His father was Charles A. McAlister, and his mother was Emily Connor. His father served three years in the Confederate Army. McAlister won a scholarship to take courses at the University of Nashville. He traveled to Phoenix, Arizona in 1898 where he worked as teacher. He later took up the study of law and was admitted to the bar in 1902. He worked as assistant district attorney for two years and district attorney for three years, before being elected judge. He served for 24 years on the Arizona Supreme Court, including four terms as chief justice. He married Alice Bishop on April 13, 1904. They had one son, Charles Bishop, and one daughter, Lillie.

McAlister's brother, William McAlister, served as a member of the Oklahoma State Senate. He died on June 3, 1950.
