= Charles C. Bernstein =

American jurist (1904–1976)

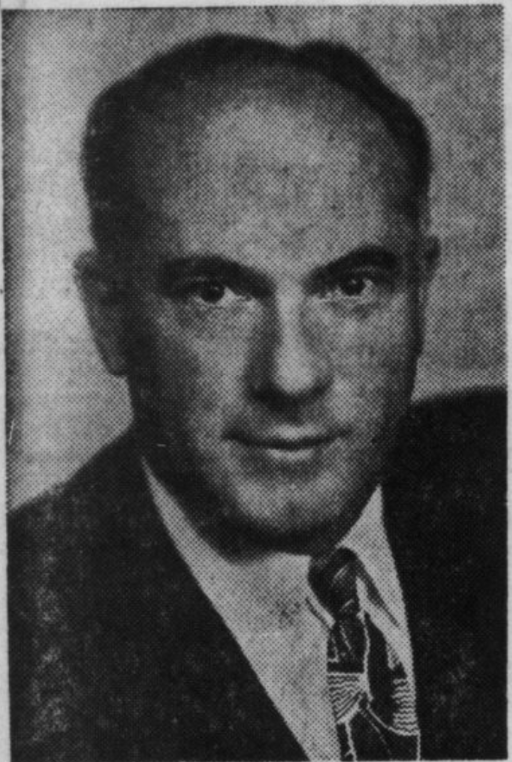

Chief Justice of the Arizona Supreme Court
- In office January 1962 – December 1963
- In office January 1967 – December 1967
- Preceded by: Fred C. Struckmeyer Jr.
- Succeeded by: Ernest W. McFarland

Justice of the Arizona Supreme Court
- In office January 5, 1959 – January 4, 1969
- Preceded by: Dudley W. Windes
- Succeeded by: Jack D. H. Hays

Personal details
- Born: June 2, 1904 St. Louis, Missouri, U.S.
- Died: April 29, 1976 (aged 71) Phoenix, Arizona, U.S.

Charles C. Bernstein (June 2, 1904 – April 29, 1976) was a justice of the Supreme Court of Arizona from January 5, 1959, to January 4, 1969. He served as chief justice from January 1962 to December 1963, and from January 1967 to December 1967.

== Early life and education ==
Born in St. Louis, Missouri, Bernstein received an LL.B. from Southwestern University in Los Angeles in 1929, and was admitted to the Arizona Bar the following year.

== Career ==
Bernstein served as Assistant Attorney General for Arizona from 1937 to 1939, and was a Delegate to the Democratic National Convention in 1940 and 1944. From 1946 to 1948, he was secretary of the Democratic State Central Committee.

In 1949 he was appointed as a Superior Court Judge in Arizona, becoming "the first Jewish judge in Arizona history", where he "achieved a national reputation as a juvenile court judge".

He ended barefoot desert marches that were used to punish juvenile offenders at Fort Grant, and served on the Awards Jury for the 1968 Freedom Foundation national and school awards. Judge Bernstein also applied the Kent Decree, a source of basic water law in Arizona, to farmland in Maricopa County, and called the first grand jury in Arizona. He served as chairman of the Charter Review Committee that organized the charter government reform movement in Phoenix.

On May 5, 1954, Bernstein ruled that segregation of African-American students in Phoenix's Wilson Elementary School District was a violation of the 14th Amendment in Heard vs. Davis. At the time, the U.S. Supreme Court was preparing to decide Brown v. Board of Education, and the Supreme Court requested a copy of Judge Bernstein's opinion. On May 17, 1954, the Supreme Court announced its decision in Brown, that the doctrine of "separate, but equal" was unconstitutional.

Bernstein was elected to the Supreme Court of Arizona in 1958, taking office the following January.

In 1967, Bernstein and Governor Jack Williams, called a citizens' conference on Arizona courts, which resulted in a permanent organization called The Citizens' Association on Arizona Courts, "whose primary goal was the establishment of a system for the merit selection of judges." In 1974, Arizona passed a constitutional amendment providing for the merit selection of judges, except superior court judges in counties with a population of 150,000 or more.

Bernstein died in Phoenix, Arizona.

== Publications ==
- Disposition of Civil Appeals in the Supreme Court, 5 Ariz.L.Rev. 175 (Spring 1964).

== See also ==
- List of Jewish American jurists
