= Robert M. Brutinel =

American judge (born 1958)

Robert Brutinel
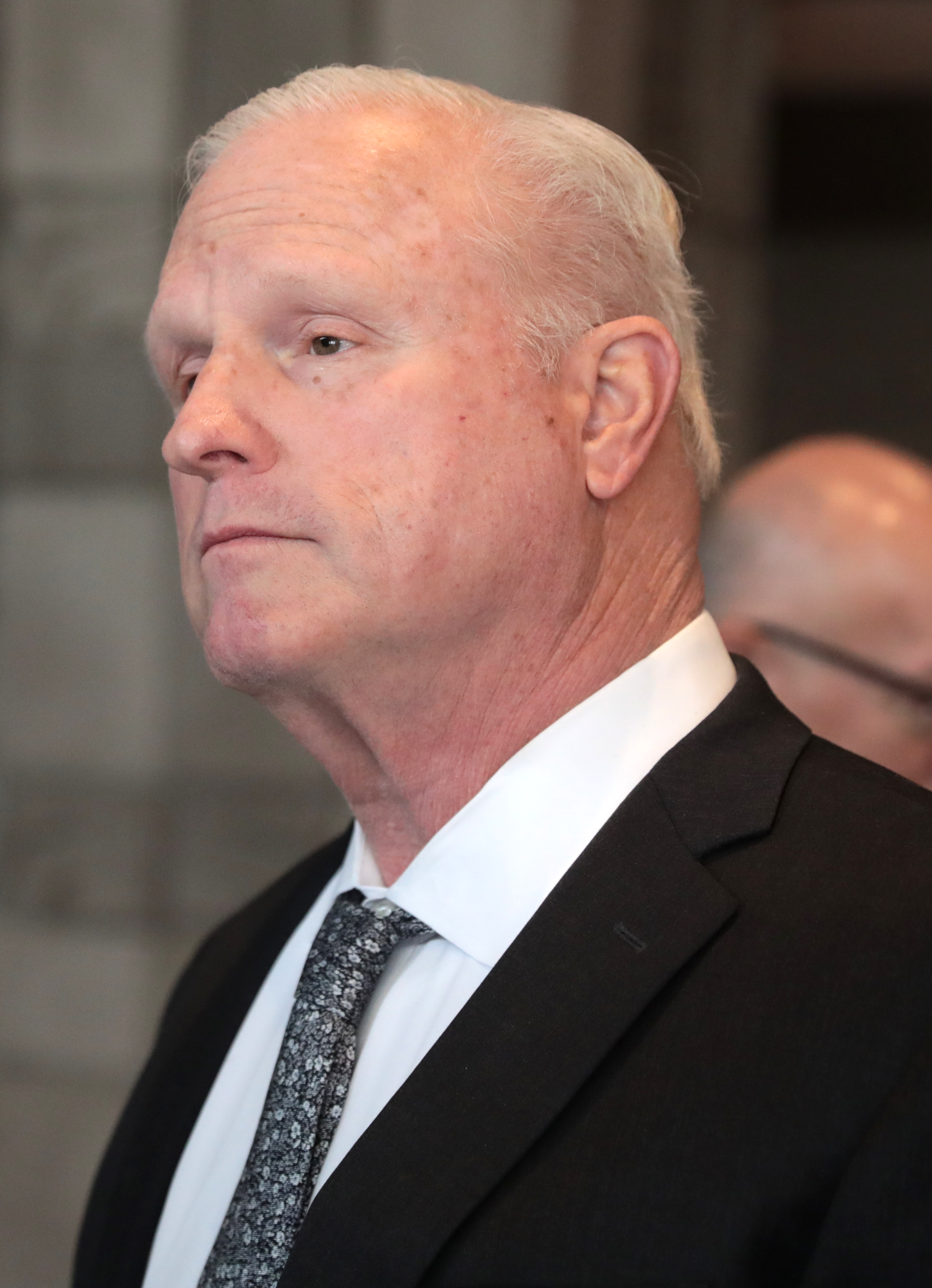

46th Chief Justice of the Arizona Supreme Court
- In office July 1, 2019 – July 1, 2024
- Preceded by: Scott Bales
- Succeeded by: Ann Timmer

Vice Chief Justice of the Arizona Supreme Court
- In office January 25, 2018 – July 1, 2019
- Preceded by: John Pelander
- Succeeded by: Ann Timmer

Associate Justice of the Arizona Supreme Court
- In office November 22, 2010 – October 31, 2024
- Appointed by: Jan Brewer
- Preceded by: Michael D. Ryan
- Succeeded by: Maria Elena Cruz

Personal details
- Born: Robert Maurice Brutinel; March 18, 1958 (age 68)
- Party: Republican
- Education: Arizona State University, Tempe (BA); University of Arizona (JD)

Robert Maurice Brutinel (born March 18, 1958) is a former justice of the Arizona Supreme Court. He was appointed by Governor Jan Brewer to the court in 2010 and retired in 2024.

== Professional career ==
Brutinel is a graduate of the University of Arizona school of law. After graduating law school Brutinel worked in private practice before being appointed a superior court judge in Yavapai County in 1996. He served as the presiding judge from 2004 until his appointment to the Supreme Court in 2010. Brutinel was retained in an election in 2014, and 2020.

In 2019, Brutinel was elected by his fellow justices to a term as Chief Justice, replacing Justice Scott Bales.

On September 24, 2024, Brutinel announced his retirement from the Arizona Supreme Court, effective October 31, 2024.

Legal offices
Preceded by Michael D. Ryan	Associate Justice of the Arizona Supreme Court; 2010–2024	Succeeded by Maria Elena Cruz
Preceded by Scott Bales	Chief Justice of the Arizona Supreme Court; 2019–2024	Succeeded by Ann Timmer
