= Charles E. Jones (judge) =

American judge (1935–2018)

Chief Justice of the Arizona Supreme Court
- In office January 1, 2002 – June 12, 2005
- Preceded by: Thomas A. Zlaket
- Succeeded by: Ruth V. McGregor

Justice of the Arizona Supreme Court
- In office April 26, 1996 – 2005
- Preceded by: Robert J. Corcoran
- Succeeded by: Scott Bales

Personal details
- Born: June 12, 1935 Lethbridge, Alberta, Canada
- Died: December 20, 2018 (aged 83) Phoenix, Arizona, U.S.
- Party: Republican
- Education: Brigham Young University (BA); Stanford University (JD)

Charles Edward Jones (June 12, 1935 – December 20, 2018) was an American lawyer who served as a justice of the Arizona Supreme Court from 1996 to 2002 and then as the chief justice of the court from 2002 to 2005. Jones was a member of the Church of Jesus Christ of Latter-day Saints (LDS Church) and served in several positions in the church.

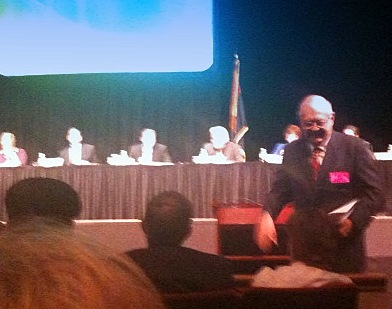
Jones laughing at a quip by Phoenix mayor Phil Gordon. Jones had just spoken before the Phoenix City Council in support of a zoning exception for the proposed Phoenix Arizona Temple. Taken at the Orpheum Theater, Phoenix, Arizona, 2 December 2009.

== Biography ==
Jones was born and raised in Lethbridge, Alberta. He served as a missionary of the LDS Church in the French Mission in the 1950s, which included France and the French-speaking portions of Belgium and Switzerland. In 1959, he graduated from Brigham Young University with a Bachelor of Arts. He then received a Juris Doctor from Stanford Law School.

Jones married Elizabeth Ann Anderson, a native of Safford, Arizona. They were the parents of seven children.

Jones was admitted to the bar in California in 1962 and then admitted to the bar in Arizona in 1964. From 1963 he was part of the firm of Jennings, Stouss & Salmon and was the head of their labor and employment division. From 1994 to 1998 Jones was the national chair of the J. Reuben Clark Law Society.

In the LDS Church, Jones has served in several positions including as a bishop and stake president. From 1990 to 1993 he served as president of the France Paris Mission.

Jones died on December 20, 2018, from complications of a brain aneurysm. One of Jones's daughters is Utah journalist Ruth Todd.
