= Ann Timmer =

American judge (born 1960)

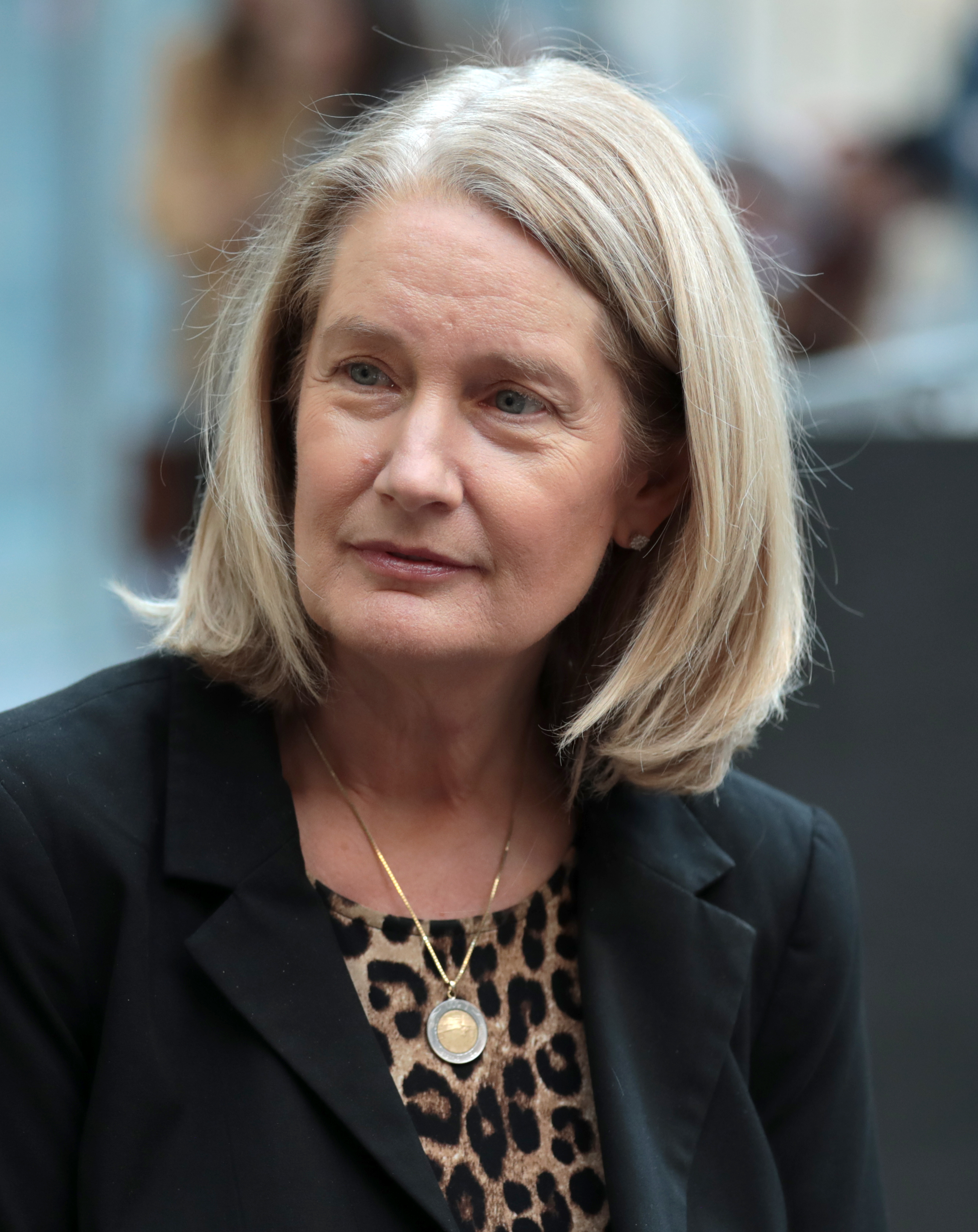

Chief Justice of the Arizona Supreme Court
- Incumbent
- Assumed office July 1, 2024
- Preceded by: Robert M. Brutinel

Vice Chief Justice of the Arizona Supreme Court
- In office July 1, 2019 – July 1, 2024
- Preceded by: Robert M. Brutinel
- Succeeded by: John Lopez IV

Associate Justice of the Arizona Supreme Court
- Incumbent
- Assumed office October 12, 2012
- Appointed by: Jan Brewer
- Preceded by: Andrew Hurwitz

Personal details
- Born: September 12, 1960 (age 65)
- Party: Republican
- Education: University of Arizona (BA); Arizona State University, Tempe (JD); Duke University (LLM)

Ann A. Scott Timmer (born September 12, 1960) is an American lawyer who has served as the chief justice of the Arizona Supreme Court since 2024. She concurrently has served as a justice of the court since 2012.

== Education ==
Timmer attended the University of Arizona and graduated with a Bachelor of Arts degree in 1982. Timmer graduated from Arizona State University College of Law in 1985. In 2018, she graduated from Duke Law School with an LLM in judicial studies.

== Career ==
Timmer worked for private law firms in Phoenix, Arizona. She focused on commercial and employment litigation. She later tried capital murder cases as a defense attorney, representing Michael Poland, and also served as a special prosecutor in the case against Robert Cruz.

Timmer also represented the family of Althea Hayes in their civil wrongful death lawsuit against Phoenix Suns player Jerrod Mustaf. Mustaf settled the lawsuit out of court for an undisclosed amount.

She was appointed in 2000 by then-Governor Jane Dee Hull to the Arizona Court of Appeals, Division One. The voters retained Timmer to the court in 2002 and 2008. Timmer was the chief judge at the time of her 2012 appointment by then Governor Jan Brewer to the Arizona Supreme Court. She became chief justice of the Arizona Supreme Court on July 1, 2024, succeeding Robert Brutinel.

== Family ==
Timmer's sister, Laurie Roberts, is a columnist for the Arizona Republic. Roberts frequently writes columns that are critical of Arizona's judiciary and other aspects of Arizona government.

Timmer is married and has three daughters. Because one of her daughters is deaf, Timmer learned American Sign Language at the Arizona State Schools for the Deaf and Blind in Tucson.

== Publications ==
- “Working Class – What Seasoned Attorneys Will Never Tell You,” Arizona Attorney, February 2008 (cover-featured article)
- “Diversity Lunches Answer the Real Questions,” Maricopa Lawyer, December 2004 (p. 14)
- “Alternative Work: Wave of the Future or Fast Track,” Arizona Attorney, May 2001 (co-author)

Legal offices
Preceded by Andrew Hurwitz	Associate Justice of the Arizona Supreme Court; 2012–present	Incumbent
Preceded by Robert M. Brutinel	Chief Justice of the Arizona Supreme Court; 2024–present	Incumbent
