= Marlin T. Phelps =

American judge (1881–1964)

Chief Justice of the Arizona Supreme Court
- In office January 1954 – December 1954
- In office January 1959 – December 1959
- Preceded by: Rawghlie Clement Stanford
- Succeeded by: Fred C. Struckmeyer Jr.

Justice of the Arizona Supreme Court
- In office January 4, 1949 – January 3, 1961
- Preceded by: Position Established
- Succeeded by: Lorna E. Lockwood

Personal details
- Born: October 9, 1881
- Died: February 13, 1964 (aged 82) Phoenix, Arizona

Marlin Theophelus Phelps (October 9, 1881 – February 13, 1964) was a justice of the Supreme Court of Arizona from January 4, 1949 to January 3, 1961. He served as chief justice from January 1954 to December 1954, and from January 1959 to December 1959.

== Biography ==
Born in Tennessee, Phelps received his law degree from Vanderbilt University. He died at Good Samaritan Hospital in Phoenix, Arizona.

Phelps served as a judge on the superior court from 1923 to 1948. When he took the bench he was one of two superior court judges in the county and when he retired the number had increased to seven. An outspoken critic of judicial activism and a founding member and director of the John Birch Society, Phelps was characterized by the Washington Post as the "high priest of conservatism."

He served on the state supreme court for 12 years until December 31, 1960 when he was defeated in his re-election bid. Of his 1960 defeat, he said: "I have reached the age when in my philosophy and my relationship with God I believe that anything that happens to me is for the best. And I accept the last election in that way." In 1961 Judge Phelps came out of retirement to help handle a large backload of criminal cases in superior court, devoting several months to the task.

=== Marriage ===
Phelps married Margaret Phelps (born 1884 in Christianburg, Virginia) and they had a son, William. Margaret came to Phoenix in 1912 from Nashville, Tennessee. Margaret wrote children's books with an Arizona background including: Pico and the Silver Mountain, Toby on the Sheep Drive, Regular Cowboy, Antelope Boy, Chia and the Lambs, Guard and the Golden Boy, Ketch Dog and Territory Boy. Margaret died on September 18, 1953, in Phoenix.
