= Fred C. Struckmeyer Jr. =

American judge (1912–1992)

Frederick Christian Struckmeyer Jr.

Chief Justice of the Arizona Supreme Court
- In office January 1960 – December 1961
- In office January 1966 – December 1966
- In office January 1971 – December 1971
- In office January 1980 – January 1, 1981
- Preceded by: Marlin T. Phelps
- Succeeded by: William A. Holohan

Justice of the Arizona Supreme Court
- In office January 3, 1955 – January 4, 1982
- Preceded by: Rawghlie Clement Stanford
- Succeeded by: Stanley Feldman

Personal details
- Born: January 4, 1912 Phoenix, Arizona
- Died: June 22, 1992 (aged 80)
- Education: University of Arizona

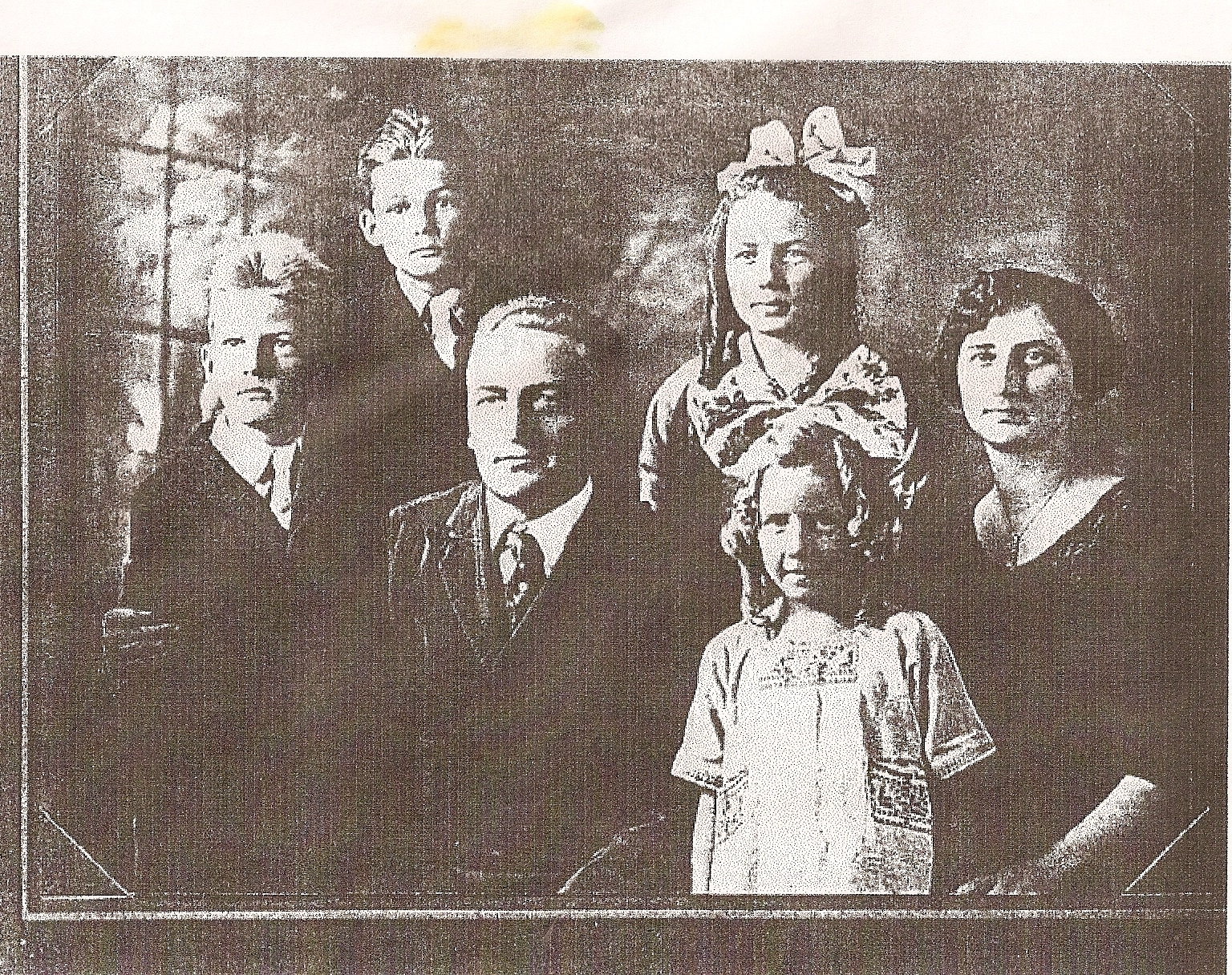
Judge Struckmeyer & Family, circa 1922

Frederick Christian Struckmeyer Jr. (January 4, 1912 – June 22, 1992) was a justice of the Supreme Court of Arizona from January 3, 1955, to January 19, 1982. He served as chief justice of the court on four occasions.

== Biography ==
Struckmeyer was the eldest son of Justice Frederick Christian "F.C." Struckmeyer, Sr., who served one term on the Superior Court in Maricopa County from 1923 to 1925, then as code commissioner. Struckmeyer received a bachelor's degree and then a law degree in 1936 from University of Arizona. He went to work as a deputy Maricopa County attorney before serving in the United States Army during World War II where he was awarded the Silver Star Bronze Star Medal and a Purple Heart.

He became a Superior Court judge in 1950. Five years later he was elected to the Arizona Supreme Court, where he served for 26 years. At 43, he was the youngest person ever elected or appointed to the Supreme Court. After his mandatory retirement at the age of 70 he was appointed to the Arizona Racing Commission.

On February 9, 1953, Judge Struckmeyer decided the case Phillips vs. Phoenix Union High Schools and Junior College District, a case over Carver High School, the only legally segregated high school in the state. In the case, Struckmeyer ruled that the Arizona law permitting school boards to segregate pupils was unconstitutional, and the Phoenix Union High School District segregation of African-American students was illegal. "A half century of intolerance is enough," wrote Struckmeyer. The school board did not appeal. His decision was made a year before the Supreme Court of the United States decided Brown v. Board of Education.

In 1988, he rejoined the high court for Green v. Osborne, a 4–1 decision that canceled a recall election for Evan Mecham because Mecham already had been impeached and removed as governor.

Judge Struckmeyer died in 1992 and was buried at the National Memorial Cemetery of Arizona in Phoenix.

== See also ==
- List of justices of the Arizona Supreme Court

== Related reading ==
- Zarbin, Earl A (1991) The bench and the bar: A history of Maricopa County's legal profession (Windsor Publications) ISBN 9780897814331
- Photo
- 1953 Photo, Arizona Sun
- 1954 Campaign Photo, El Sol
