= Edith Alice Macia =

Arizona pioneer (1884–1974)

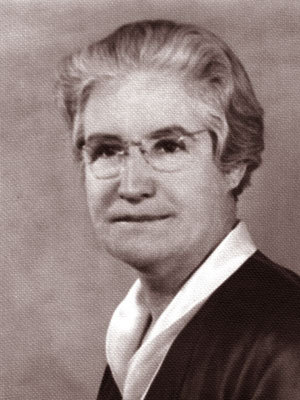
- Photograph taken around 1934

12th Postmaster of Tombstone, Arizona
- In office January 9, 1928 – June 24, 1936
- Nominated by: Hiram S. Corbett
- President: Calvin Coolidge
- Preceded by: William A. Fowler
- Succeeded by: Mrs. Minnie V. Van Deren

Member of Communist Party of America
- In office August 1943 – January 1, 1949

Personal details
- Born: Edith Alice Robertson; September 17, 1884 Leadville, Colorado, US
- Died: July 17, 1974 (aged 89) Prescott, Arizona, US
- Party: Republican
- Spouses: Norman Stirratt Barr (m. 1902; div. 1912); Harry Elmer Macia, Sr. (m. 1917)
- Relations: Col. James Herbert Macia, Jr., Doolittle Raider, Ethel Robertson Macia (sister)
- Children: 4
- Education: University of Arizona
- Occupation: Postmaster, Undercover FBI Agent
- Awards: American Legion Citation of Honor (1953); Order of Elks Outstanding Mother (1953); Veterans of Foreign Wars Certificate of Appreciation (1953); Freedom Foundation George Washington Award (1954); University of Arizona Distinguished Citizen Award (1962)
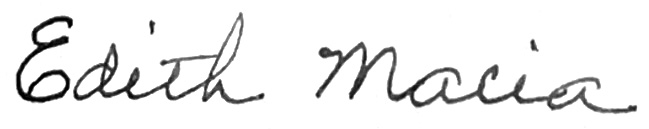
- Signature

Edith Alice Macia (née Robertson; September 17, 1884 – July 17, 1974) was a pioneer of Arizona who served as postmaster of Tombstone, Arizona and received numerous awards for her work as an undercover FBI agent.

== Early life and education ==
Edith was born on September 17, 1884, in Leadville, Colorado to parents Samuel Christy (Chris) and Alice Madora Robertson. Chris and Alice were married on October 19, 1880 and had traveled by wagon train from St. Joseph, MO via Leadville, CO to Tombstone, Arizona Territory. They arrived in Tombstone on December 25, 1880 having traveled 1,000 miles in two months and three days and remained residents of Cochise County until their deaths. Edith was born in a log cabin in Leadville at the home of her aunt Mollie and her family. At age 7 months, her family returned home to Tombstone, AZ in April 1885. Her mother died some time after the birth of her fourth child, on November 15, 1895. Edith and the family then moved to Pearce, AZ in June 1896.

Her father was murdered in front of his place of business in Pearce on October 23, 1899 by Sidney R. Page, son of Judge Page of Wilcox, AZ. He was sentenced to 20 years in prison and was released on parole after serving seven years, and receiving three years for good behavior. Following Chris' death, Edith and her minor siblings were declared wards of the court and moved back to the family home in Tombstone in 1899.

Edith completed the equivalent of 8th grade, the highest level of schooling available at the time.

Edith matriculated to the University of Arizona in fall of 1901 and completed classes in the newly formed Commercial Department.

== Career ==
=== County Treasurer's Office (1901) ===
Following her time at U of A, Edith returned to Tombstone and gained employment in the Cochise County Court House as a clerk working on tax rolls for the Tax Assessor's Office. She was one of the first women employees of Cochise County.

Edith married Norman Stirratt Barr on December 3, 1902. The wedding ceremony took place at Edith's home. Norman was trained as a construction engineer and was a journeyman machinist that installed machinery in mining towns.

Edith gave birth to Norma Stirit Barr (later Rockfellow) on August 28, 1903 in Tombstone, AZ.

In 1906 she moved to Douglas, Arizona to join her husband Norman who had gained employment in the machine shops at Q smelter.

Edith gave birth to John Robertson Barr on February 27, 1907 in Douglas, AZ.

Beginning in 1907, she lived in the mining camps of Sierra de Cobre, Cananea, Mexico with her husband while he was a master mechanic. In 1910, they had to leave due to Mexican Revolution and relocated in Los Angeles, CA. While there, she witnessed the passing of Halley's Comet, attended the farewell concert of pianist Ignacy Paderewski, and was a guest of Paderewski's cousin at the last show of Buffalo Bill Cody's Wild West Show and Congress of Rough Riders.

In 1912, she divorced from Norman Barr on grounds of desertion and moved back to Tombstone from Los Angeles with her two children Norma and John and resided in the Old Homestead purchased from father’s estate. She was once again employed by Cochise County at the time Arizona gained statehood. The following year (1913), her 10-year-old daughter Norma accidentally fell from a wagon and sustained a fractured skull and clavicle.

Edith married Harry Elmer Macia, Sr. in 1917. Harry was the younger brother of Ethel Robertson Macia's husband James Herbert (Bert) Macia, sisters were married to brothers. Harry was an established miner in Arizona and New Mexico since 1900.

Edith gave birth to Betty Rose Macia on June 14, 1918.

In 1919, Edith was awarded a Red Cross service badge for her work with the organization.

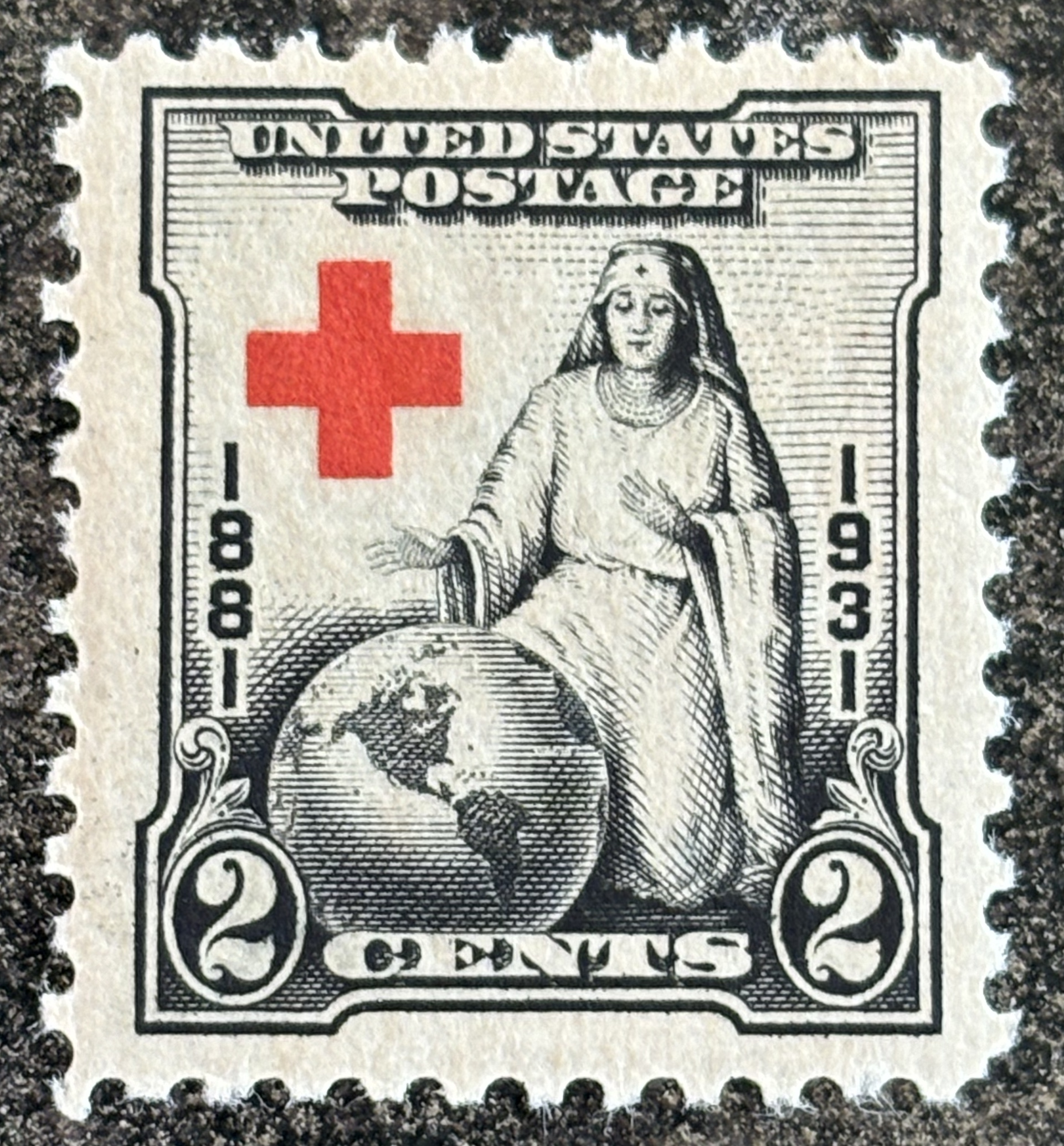
US Stamp Scott 702 American Red Cross 1931

The U.S. Census of 1920 listed Edith as a resident of Tombstone, AZ. Her father was born in Illinois and her mother in Texas. She did not have an occupation at this time.

Edith Macia, United States census, 1920; Tombstone, Cochise, Arizona; page 3B, line 85, enumeration district 2. Retrieved on 2024-04-08.

Edith gave birth to Harry Elmer Macia, Jr. (Thad) on April 2, 1924.

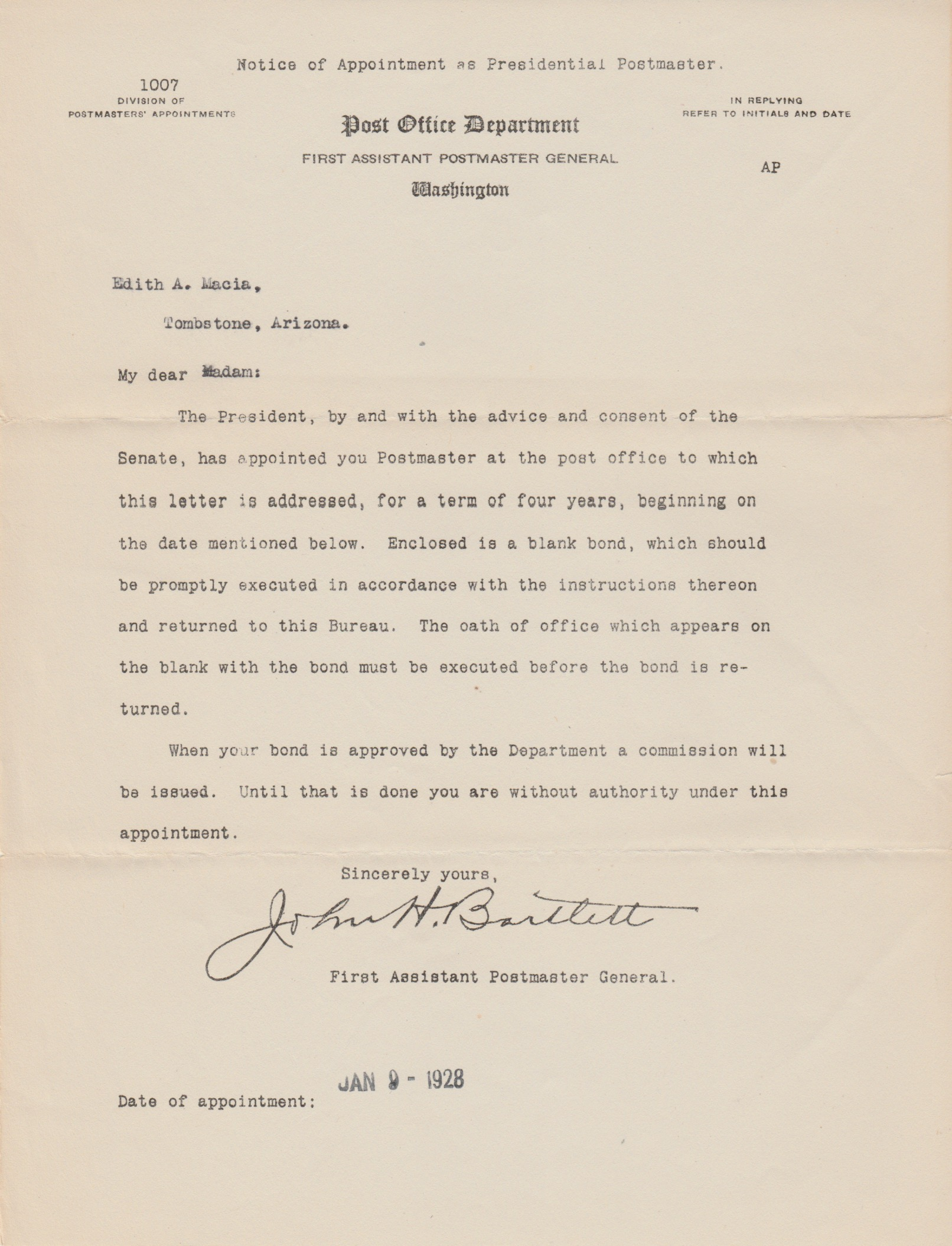
Edith's Postmaster Appointment Letter 1928

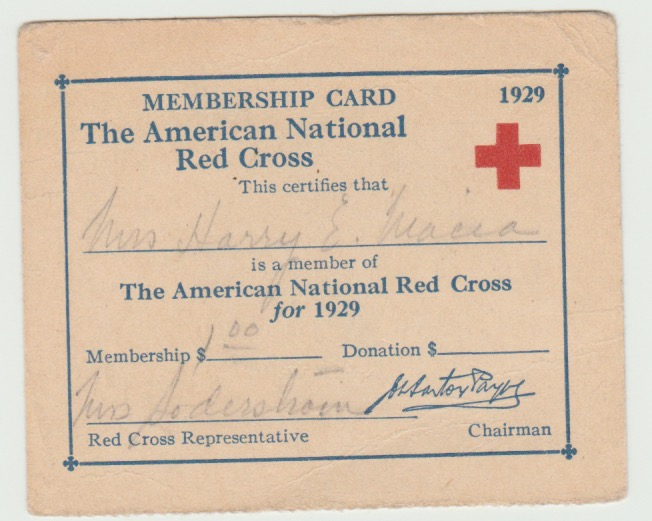
Edith's American National Red Cross Membership Card 1929

=== Tombstone Postmaster (1928-1936) ===
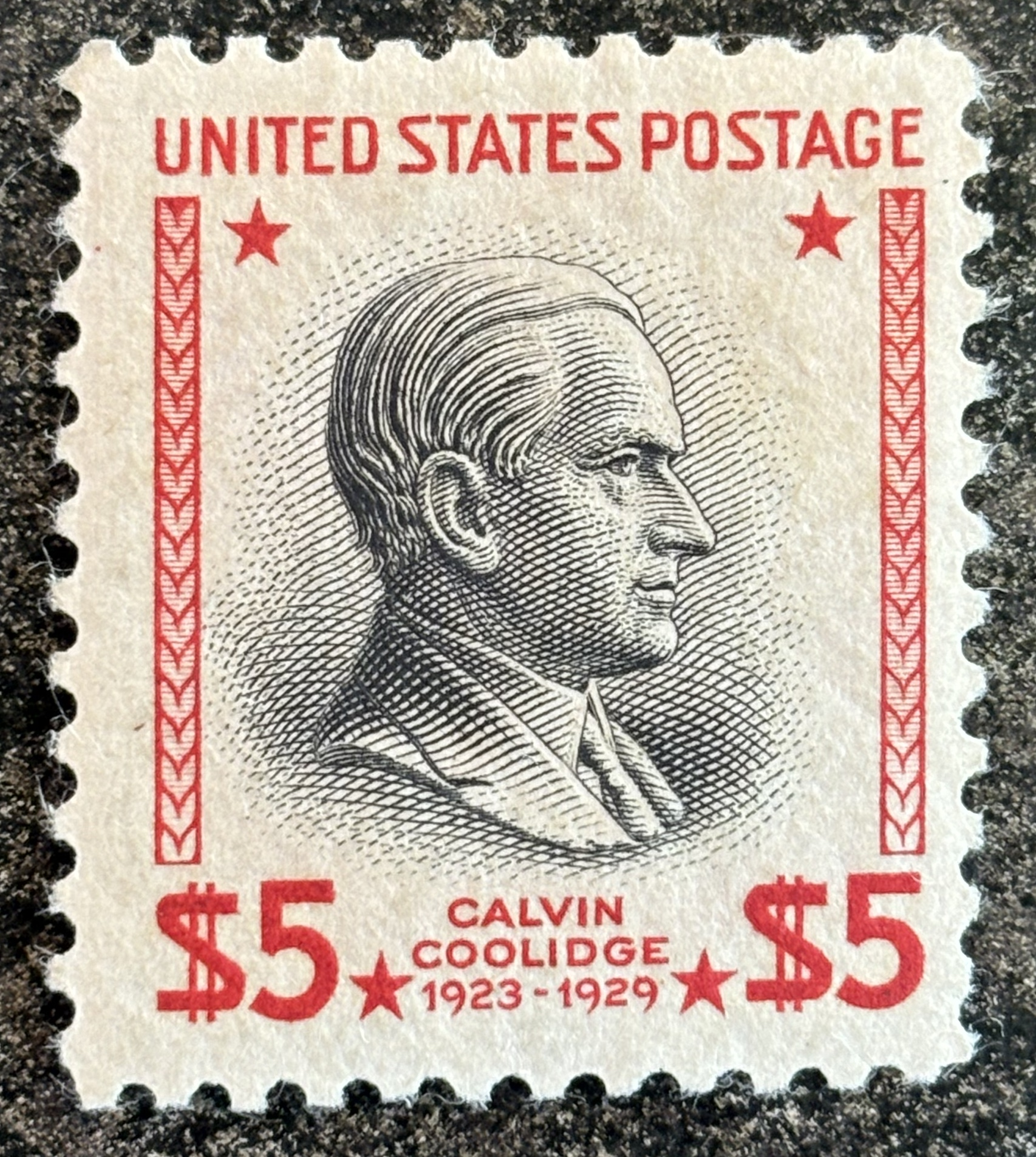
US Stamp Scott 834 Calvin Coolidge Prexie 1938

Edith received a federal appointment under Calvin Coolidge as postmaster (or postmistress) of Tombstone on January 9, 1928 after submitting her winning exam. She announced that Joe Hood, her brother-in-law, would serve as her assistant.

The U.S. Census of 1930 listed Edith as a resident of Tombstone, AZ. Her occupation was recorded as post mistress (code: 9976)

Edith Macia, United States census, 1930; Tombstone, Cochise, Arizona; page 1B, line 76, enumeration district 2-65. Retrieved on 2024-04-08.

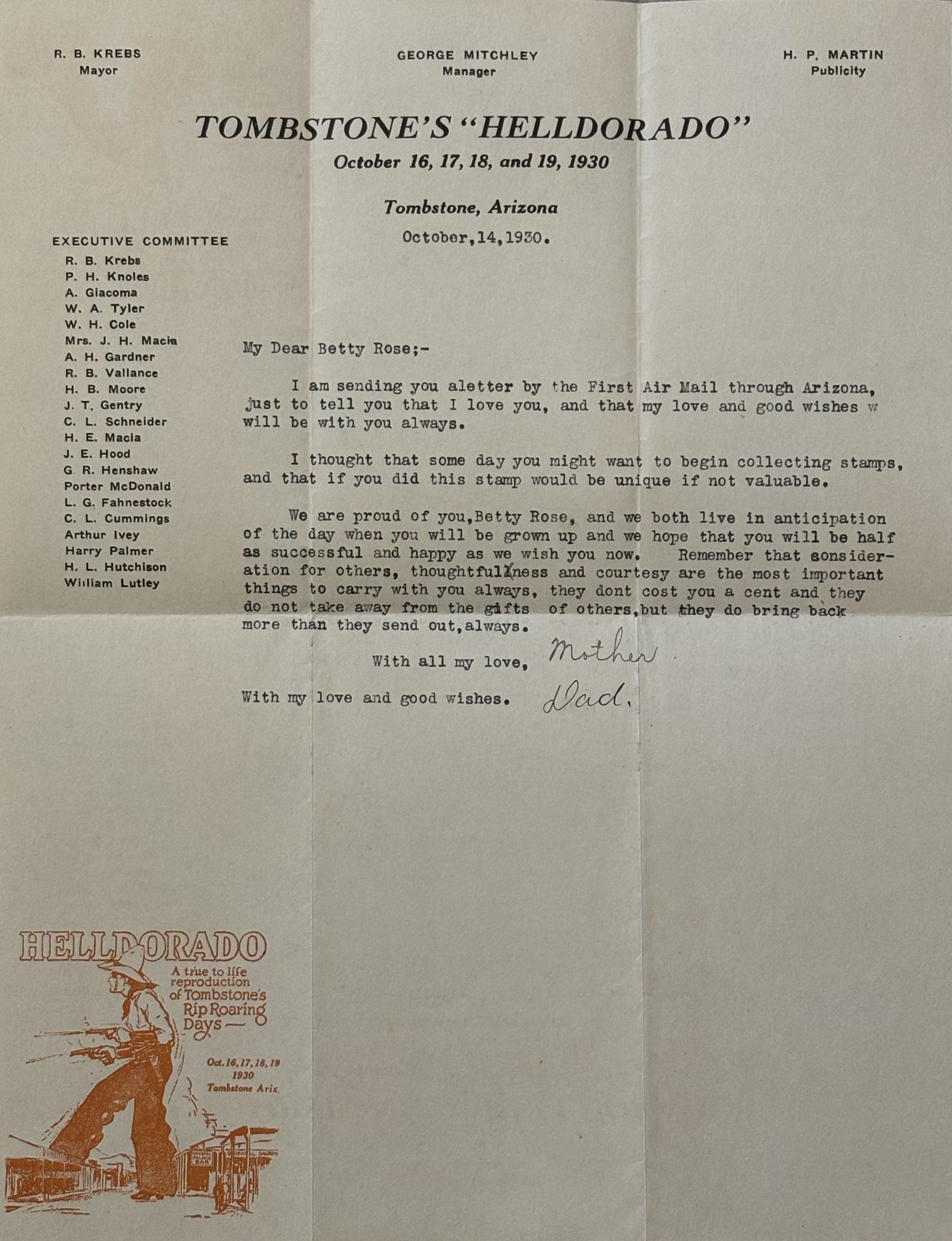
Letterhead used by Edith for a letter to her daughter Betty

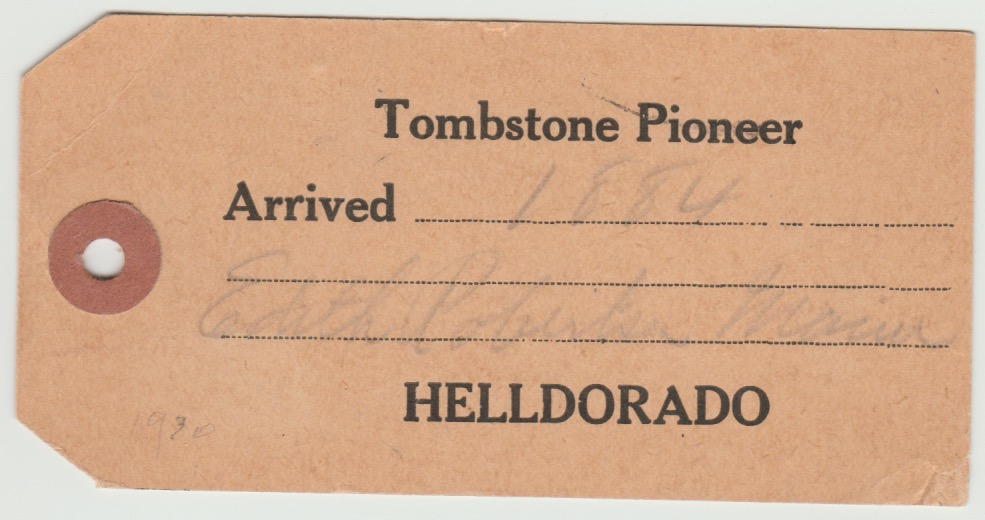
Edith's Helldorado Days Tag 1930, stating she arrived in Tombstone in 1884

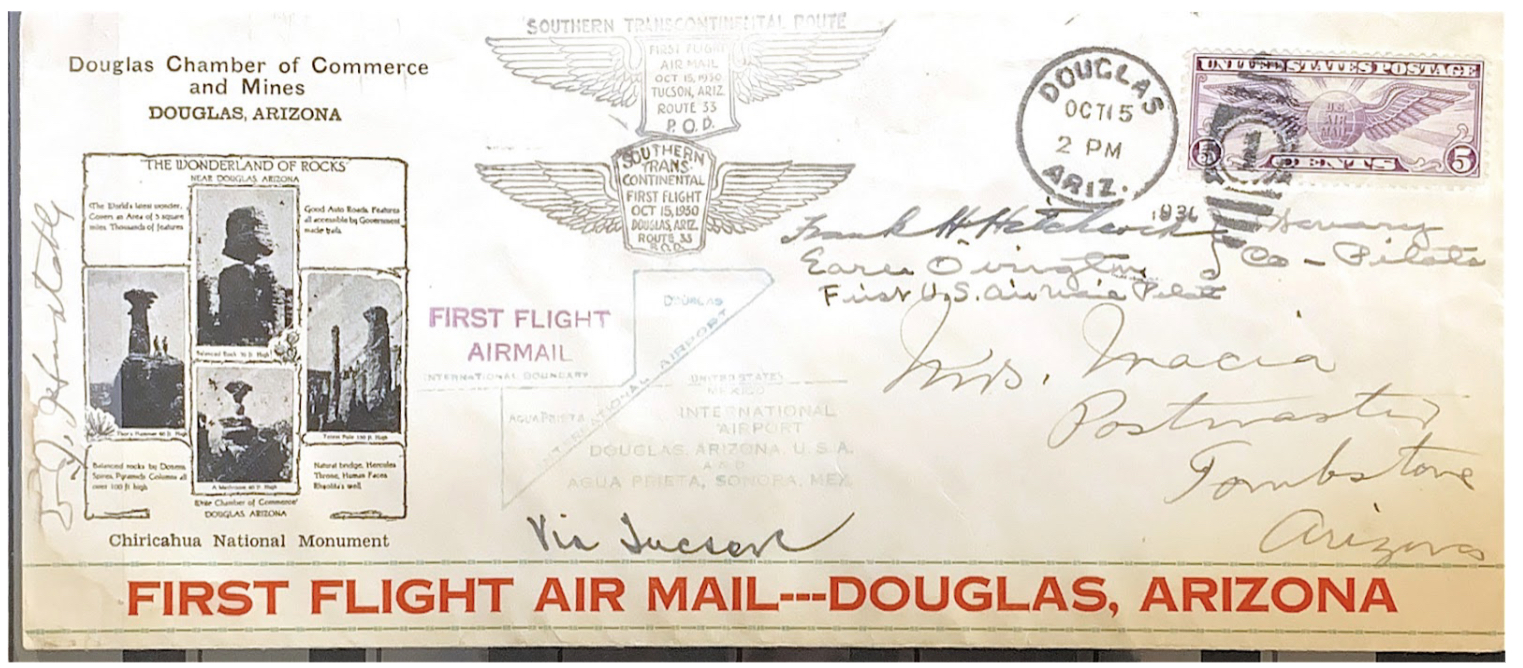
CAM 33 Air Mail Cover Autographed by Ovington and Hitchcock 1930

Edith's husband was part of the executive planning committee for Tombstone's 2nd annual Helldorado Days festival held October 16–19, 1930. She hosted a visit of former US Postmaster General Frank H. Hitchcock and air mail pilot Earle Ovington at the Tombstone Post Office on October 18, 1930. Hitchcock had flown into Tombstone from Tucson the day prior as served as an honorary "co-pilot" during the flight. During the visit to the Tombstone Post Office, Edith was able to secure signatures of Hitchcock and Ovington on a special first flight air mail cover that was sent to her by the postmaster of Douglas, AZ to commemorate the first air mail route (CAM 33) servicing Douglas, AZ. Earle Ovington and Frank Hitchcock also participated in the Helldorado pageant by riding in the parade on October 18. Edith had recognized the philatelic value of the cover and sent a letter to H. E. Harris & Co. in 1966 describing the piece and soliciting opinions on its value:

I was Postmaster of Tombstone, Arizona and this letter was mailed to me by the Postmaster of Douglas, Arizona. It arrived at about the time of the ‘Heldorado’ Celebration, going back into the past and depicting all of the Customs of the time of Tombstone’s Hey Days.

Two of the most prominent men in United States Airmail service flew to Tombstone to take part in the Parade, etc, and take part in the celebration. They decided amongst other things to come into the P.O. to see how things were progressing. I showed them my Airmail letter which had all of the cachets and marks of importance on it. It is really a beautiful cover. After examining it Mr Hitchcock, whom I know, suggested that they Autograph it, which they did. Their autographs appear thus:

(Frank H. Hitchcock) Honorary Co-Pilot

(Earle L. Ovington) First Air Mail Pilot

The Appraisal Department of H. E. Harris wrote back to Edith stating the cover was interesting and would perhaps fetch a better price if made available for sale locally in Arizona.

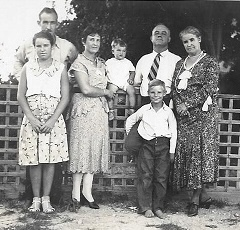
Edith and family in Tombstone, 1931.

Edith was notified of the recommendation of her reappointment to Postmaster by Hiram Corbett (namesake of Hi Corbett Field) of the Republican National Committee on November 30, 1931 (see letter at right). Her executive nomination was confirmed by the U.S. Senate on January 22, 1932.

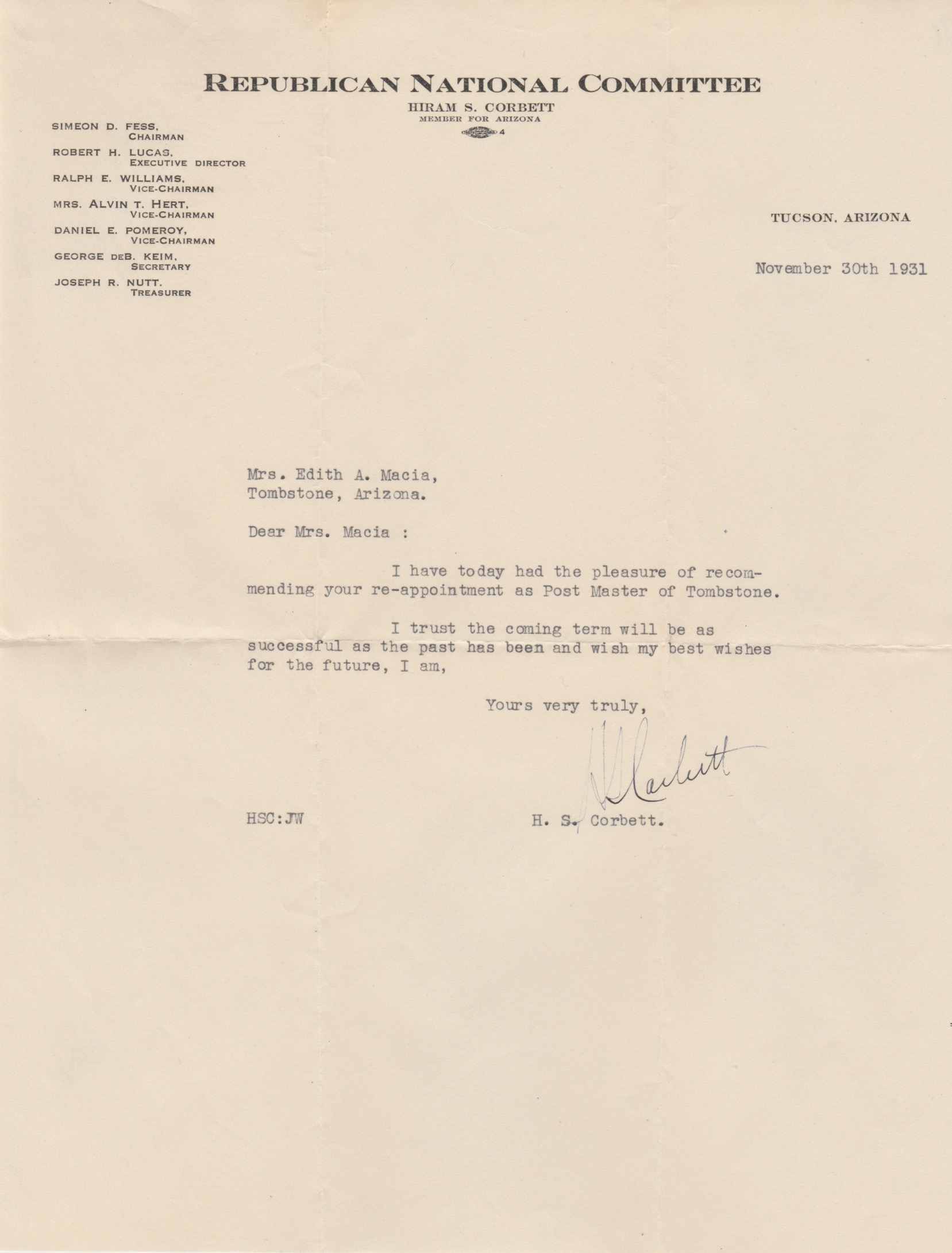
Hiram Corbett Recommendation Letter Nov 30 1931

Edith was reappointed for a second term as postmaster on February 19, 1932.

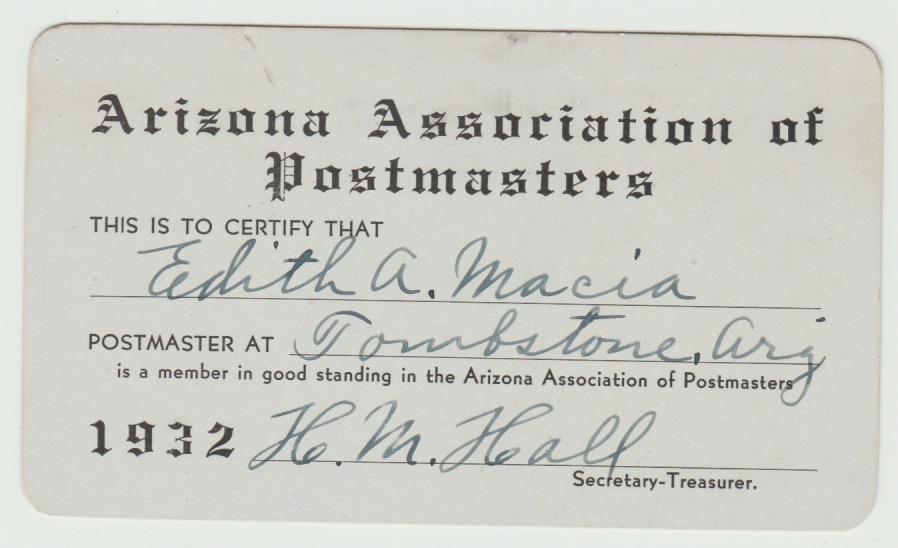
Edith's Arizona Association of Postmasters Card 1932

In May 1934, Edith returned home to Arizona after undergoing medical observation in Los Angeles. Upon returning home, she attended the US Forest Service dedication of Cochise monument in Cochise Stronghold in the Dragoon mountains. She would return to Los Angeles agin later that year.

In 1936, the Cochise County Courthouse moved to Bisbee, AZ and her tenure as postmaster expired. She sold the Old Homestead and moved to Los Angeles, California where Harry found employment.

On March 28, 1937, Edith's son John Barr died at a Los Angeles hospital as a result of injuries sustained in a car accident.

The U.S. Census of 1940 listed Edith as a residing at 1815 Roosevelt Avenue, Los Angeles, CA. She did not have an occupation at this time.

Edith Macia, United States census, 1940; Los Angeles City, Los Angeles, California; page 10A, line 3, enumeration district 60-841. Retrieved on 2024-04-08.

=== Undercover FBI Agent (1943-1958) ===
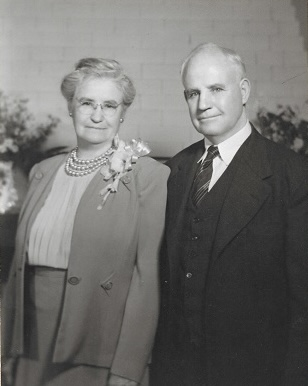
Edith and Harry in 1946

Edith had first encountered Communism during her days in Tombstone, AZ, when rebel copper miners staged a series of strikes in 1917. In August 1943, she accepted an invitation to became an undercover agent for the FBI and join the Communist Party of America. She joined under the name Edda Nicol. During her five years of party membership, she missed only three bi-monthly cell meetings and took down the names of 248 people from the dues registration book at each meeting of the Communist Party. The club's recruiting secretary once noticed Edith was taking notes during a meeting and confronted her, Edith replied:

I told her it was necessary for me to make notes if I was to remember what was said, and she told me I must never take down a name. I assured her I wouldn't.

She remained a member of the Communist Party until January 1, 1949 (five years and three months total) and then moved to Placentia, CA.

Edith disclosed her activities before a session of Congress on March 28, 1953 and continued her work with the FBI until 1958.

Edith received many awards and guest speaker invitations for her work with the FBI.

== Later life ==
In 1945, Edith purchased an unopened trunk from a public auction of a wealthy Los Angeles family. The auctioneer did not inspect the contents of the trunk because the original keys had been lost. Upon taking the trunk home and having it opened by a locksmith, she found six elaborate dresses made by hand in France during the 1890s. Investigation revealed that the dresses belonged to a wealthy woman who had died in a train crash; they were placed in the trunk and forgotten about for decades until sold at auction. In 1952, the original price of the dresses ranged from $6,000 to $15,000.

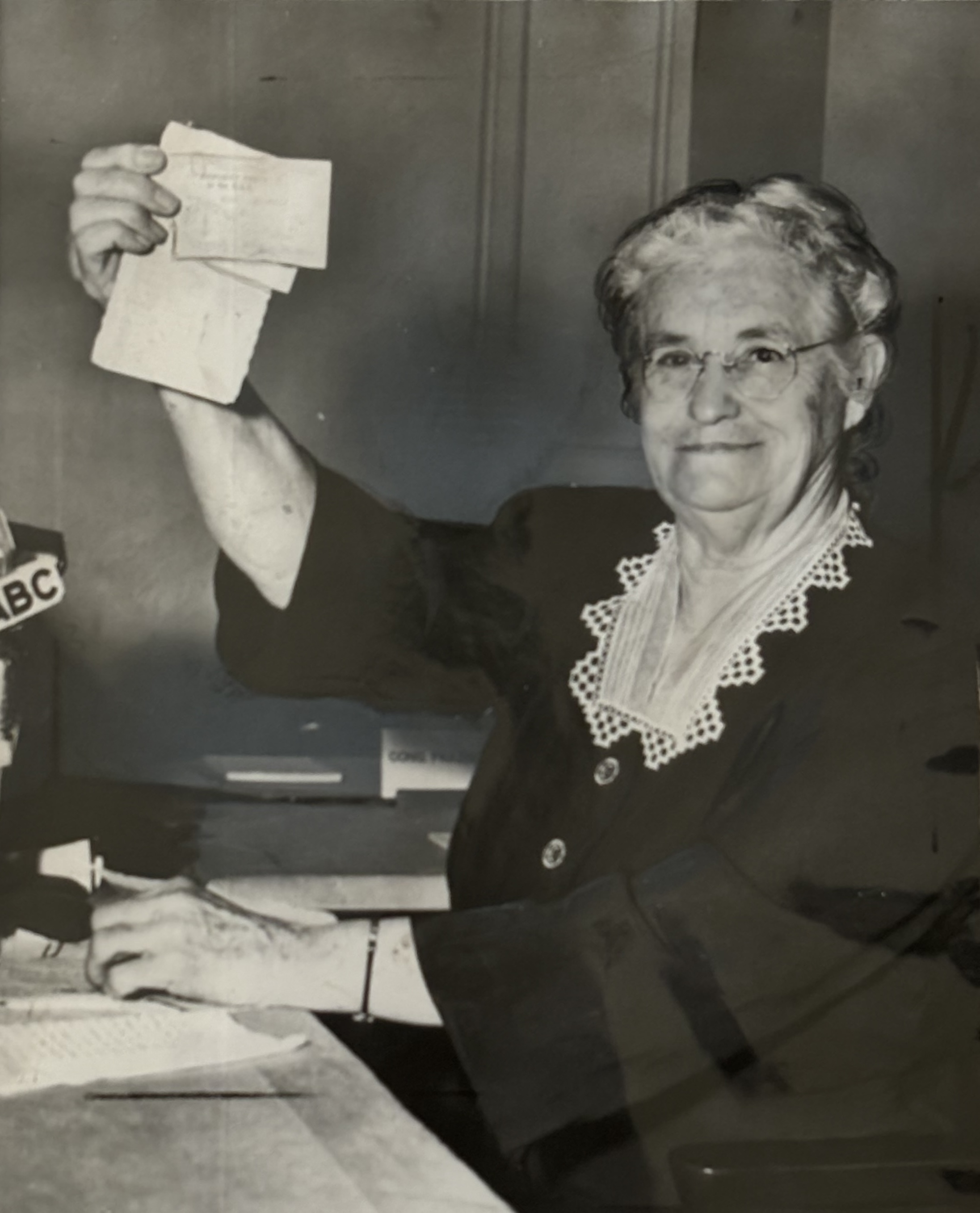
Edith holds up her Communist Party Membership Card during her testimony before the HUAC on March 28, 1953.

On March 28, 1953, she appeared as a surprise witness before the House Committee on Un-American Activities (HCUA) on their sixth day of a probe into Communist activities in Hollywood. Her testimony resulted in the break up of an important Communist cell in the West Adams district of Los Angeles. During her testimony, she recited a list of 146 names of party members she had recorded. She named Cyril Gerber and his wife Lillian as the leaders of the group.

In November 1956, she was listed as a citizen of Orange County (Placentia, CA) in support of the reelection of Republican US Congressman James Utt.

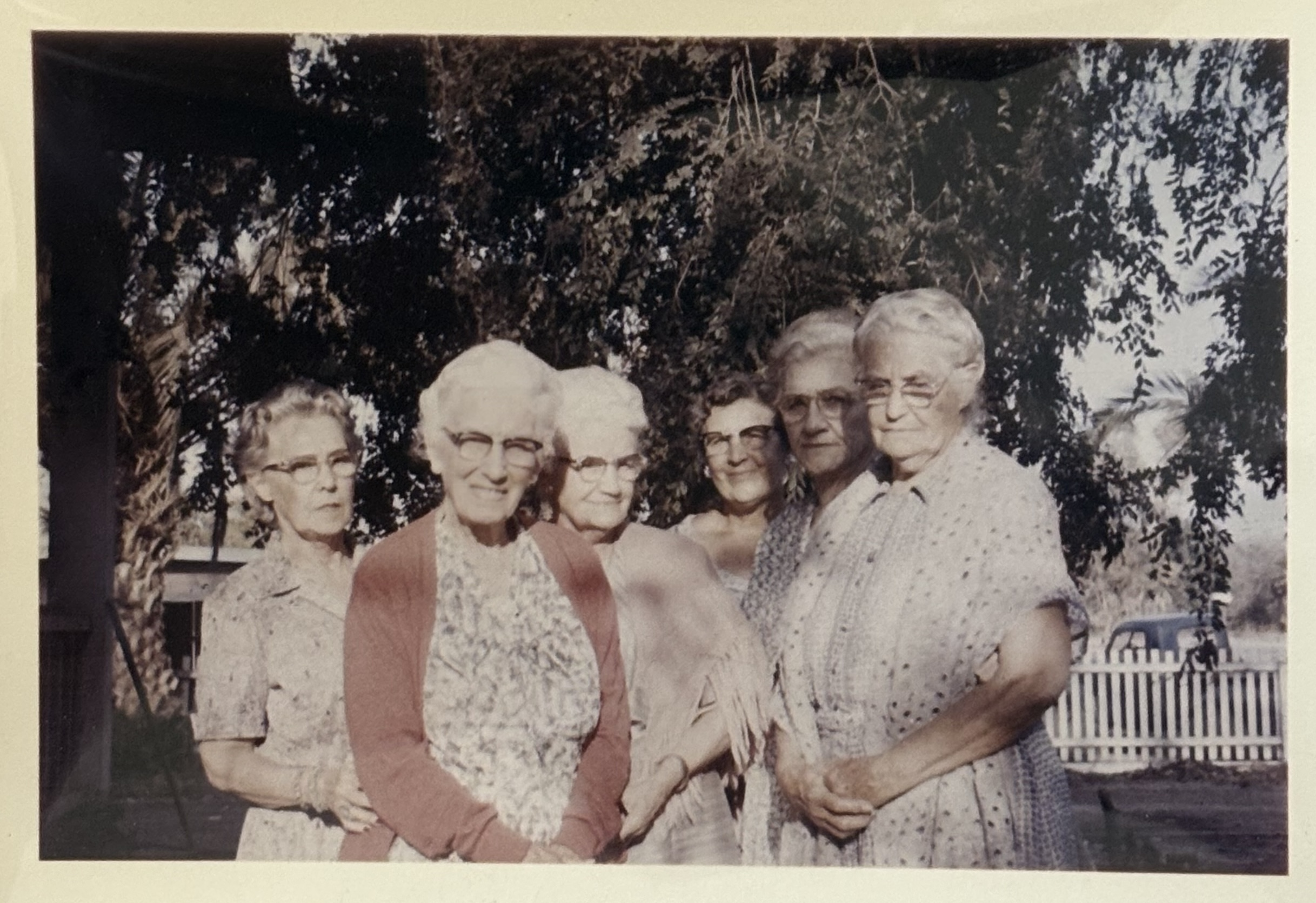
Edith (far right) with family (Ethel, Olive, Norma) and friends

On August 6, 1957, her husband died suddenly of a heart attack in their home in his easy chair.

She once traveled onboard the S.S. United States from Le Havre, France to New York from July 4 to July 8, 1958.

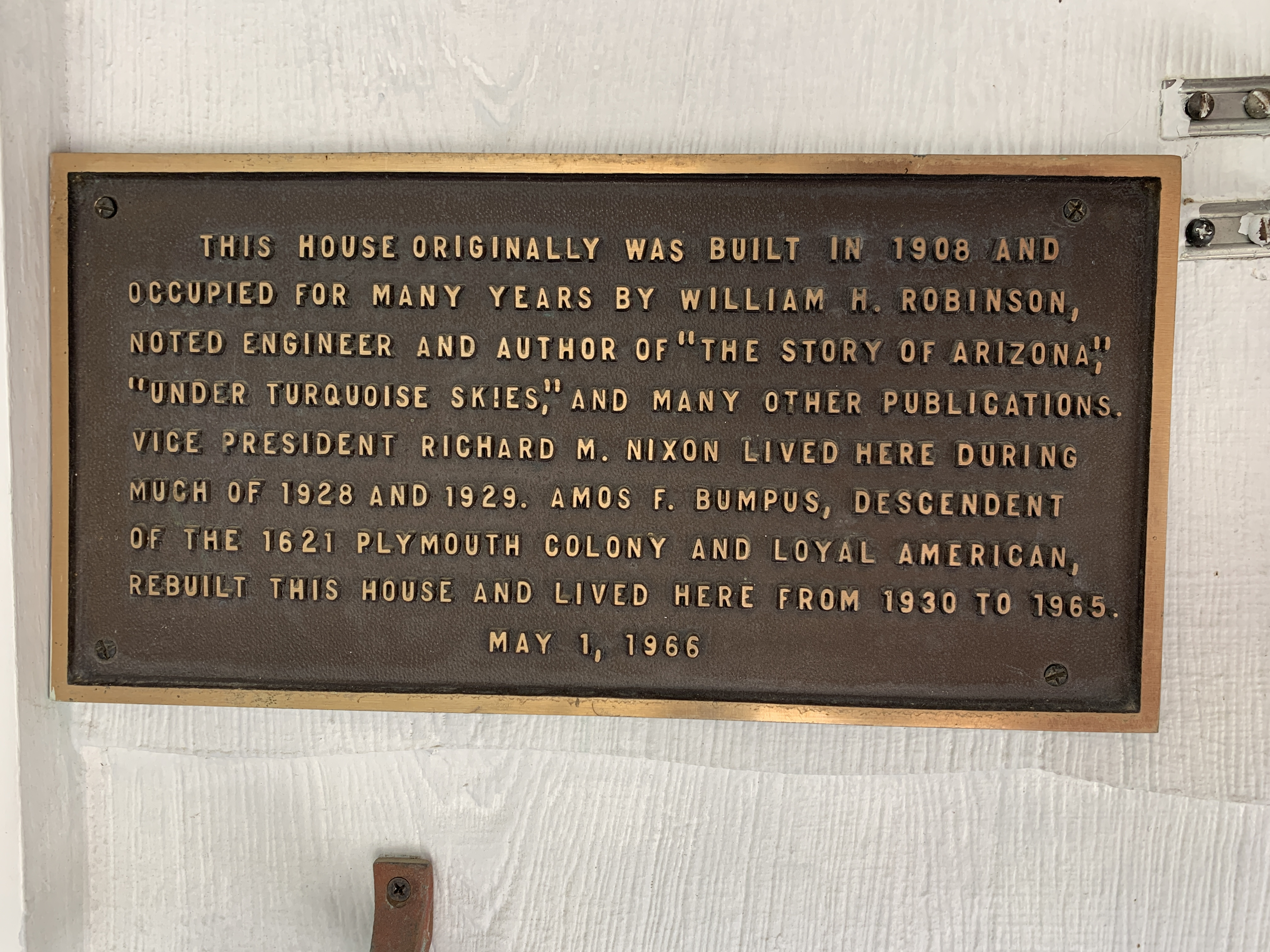
Historic building plaque on 937 Apache Drive, across from Edith's home.

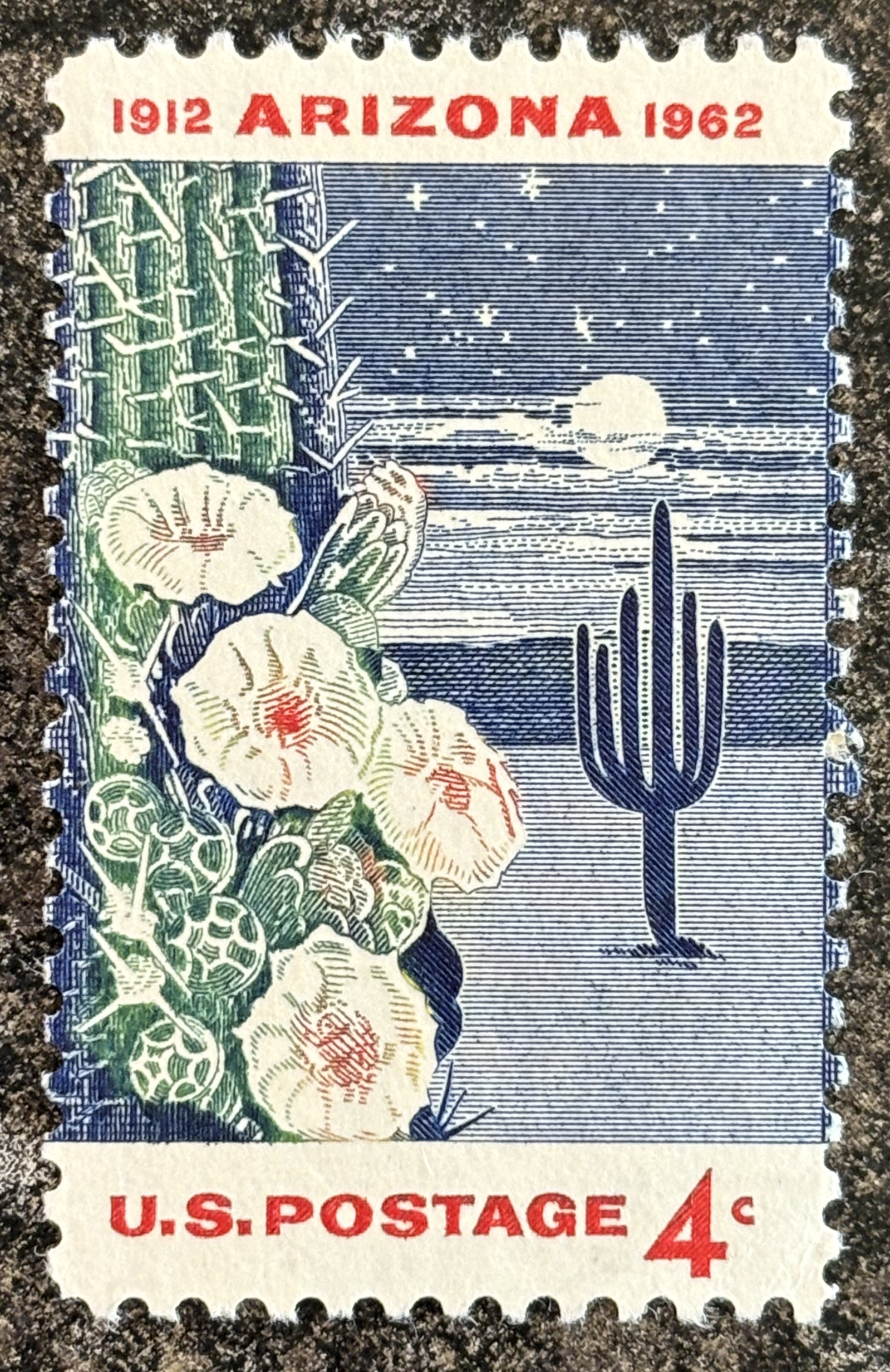
US Stamp Scott 1192 Arizona Statehood 1962

In October 1963, she purchased and moved to 944 Apache Drive in the Pinecrest Historic District of Prescott, AZ in order to be closer to her daughters. This home is located across the street from another historic home built in 1908 by William H. Robison, who was a notable engineer and author. Richard Nixon lived there during 1928 and 1929. The home was then rebuilt and occupied by Amos F. Bumpus, descendent of the Plymouth Colony of 1621, from 1930 to 1965.

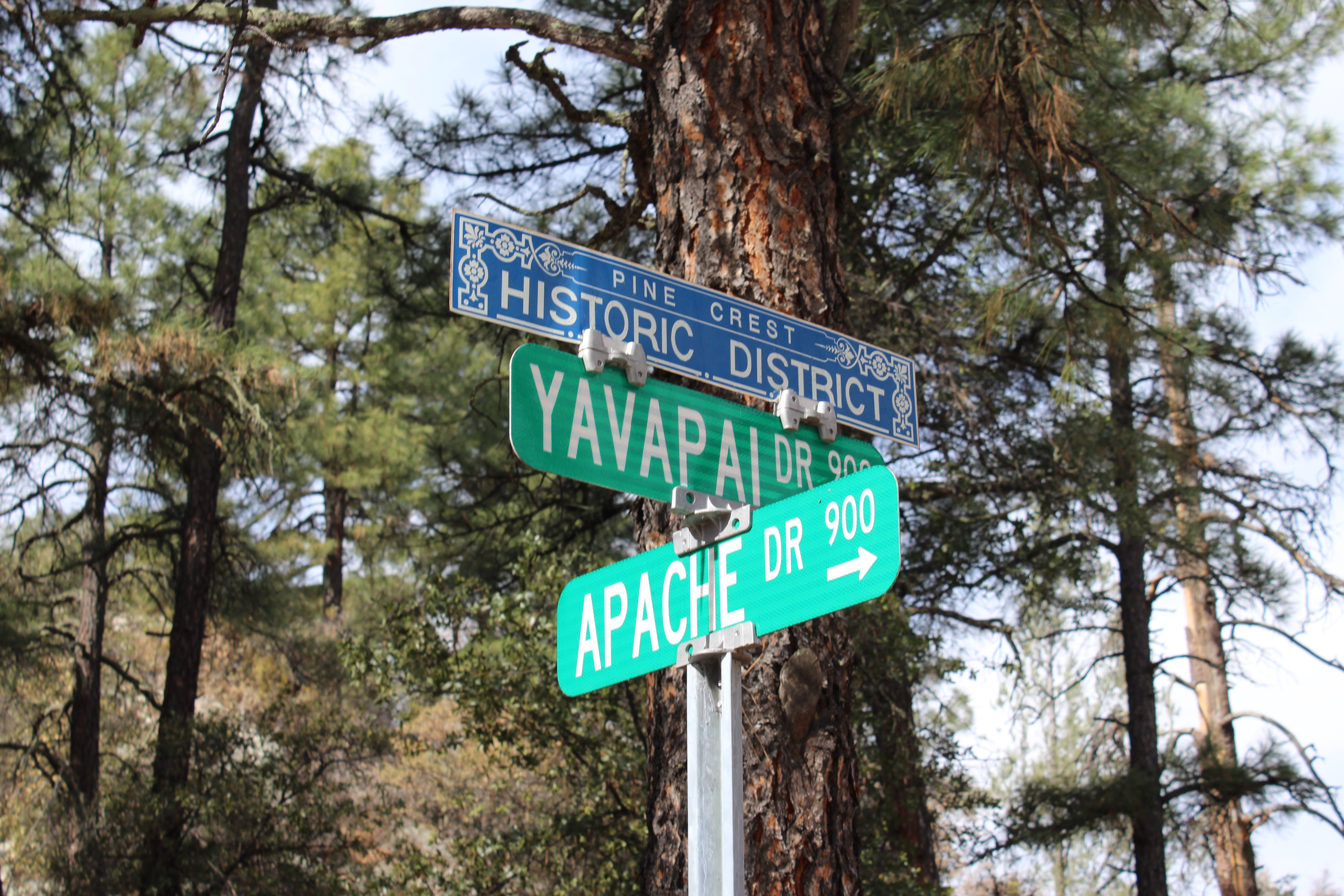
Edith's former residence in the Pine Crest Historic District of Prescott, AZ.

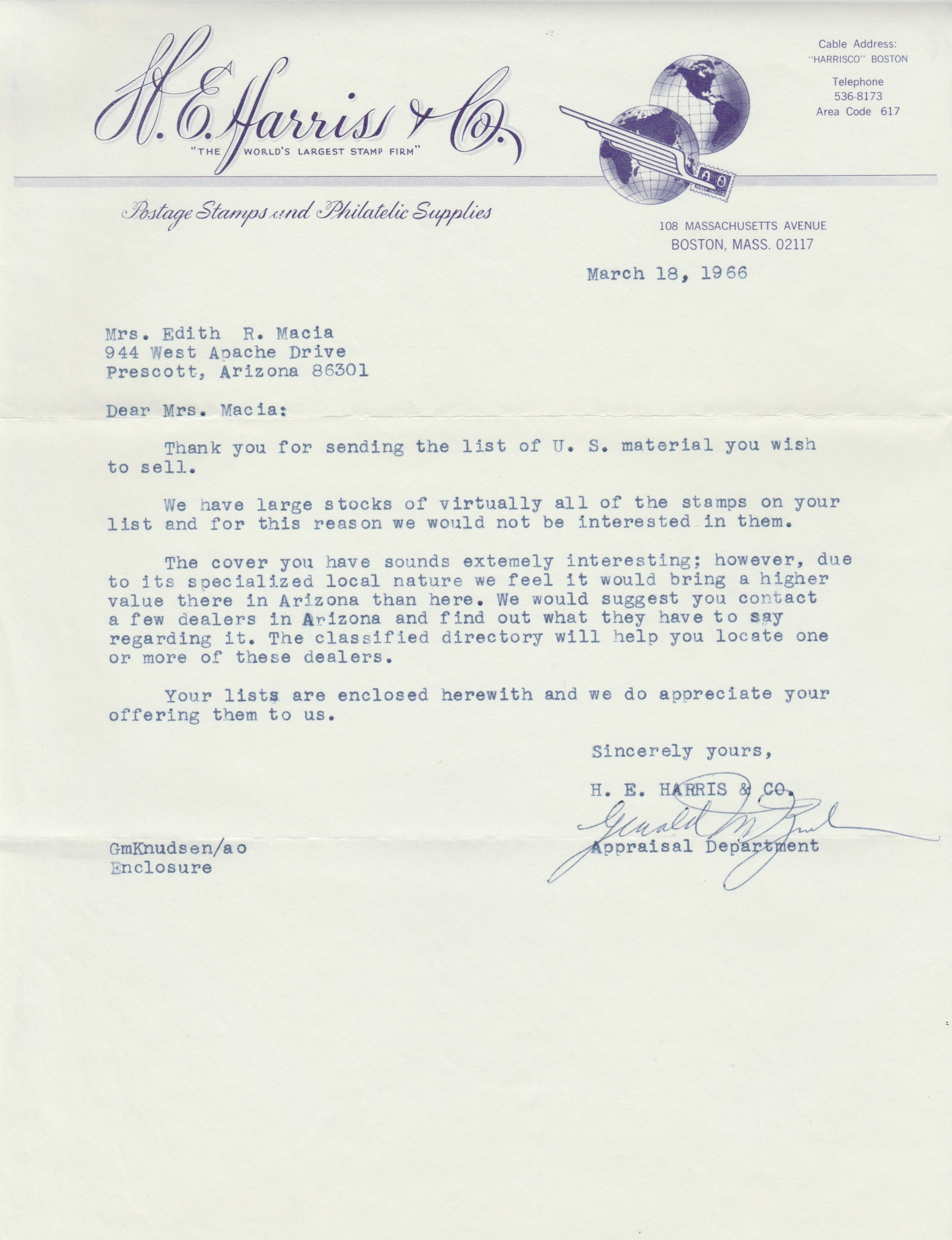
Reply Letter from H.E. Harris to Edith 1966

== Awards ==
- April 17, 1953, American Legion Citation of Honor from the 17th District, Department in California.
- May 10, 1953, citation from the Los Angeles Lodge No. 99 of the Benevolent and Protective Order of Elks as the Outstanding Mother of 1953.
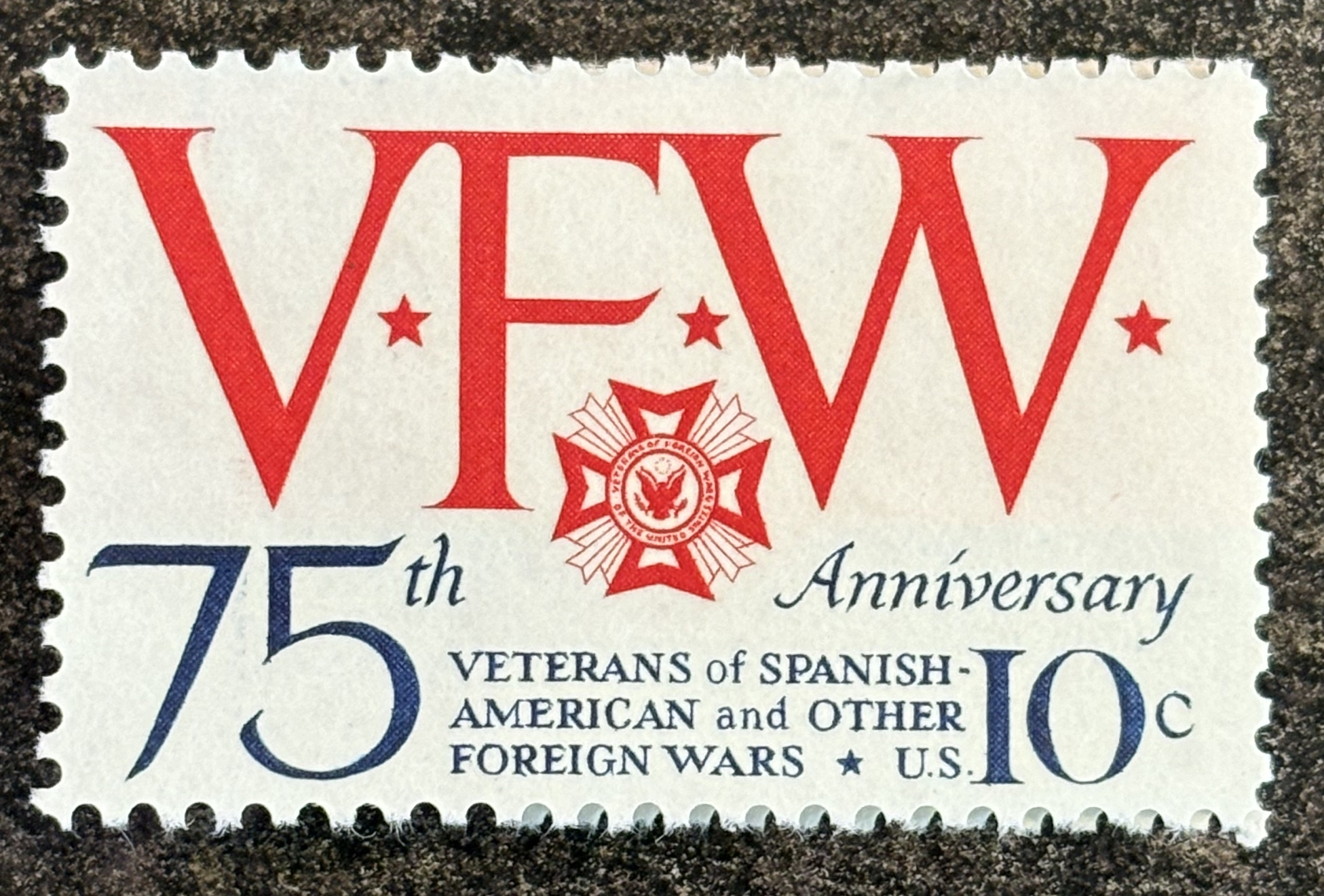
- US Stamp Scott 1525 VFW 75th Anniv 1974
  May 12, 1953, Certificate of Appreciation before a gathering of 50,000 Veterans of Foreign Wars at San Francisco.
- July 9, 1953, citation of recognition from the Garden Grove Lions Club.
- February 22, 1955, Freedoms Foundation George Washington Honor Memorial Award. The award was presented in the Washington's Birthday Freedoms Foundation awards ceremony at Valley Forge, PA.
- March 12, 1962, Distinguished Citizen's Award from her alma mater the University of Arizona.

== Death and legacy ==
Edith died on Wednesday, July 17, 1974 at Yavapai Community Hospital, in Prescott, Arizona. She was cremated on July 19 at Mountain View Crematory and her memorial service was held on July 20 at St. Luke’s Episcopal Church. Her cremains were interred with her husband Harry at Melrose Abbey Memorial Park in Anaheim, California.

Edith is honored in the Territorial Women’s Memorial Rose Garden of the Sharlot Hall Museum in Prescott.

== Gallery ==
Documents related to the life of Edith Macia.

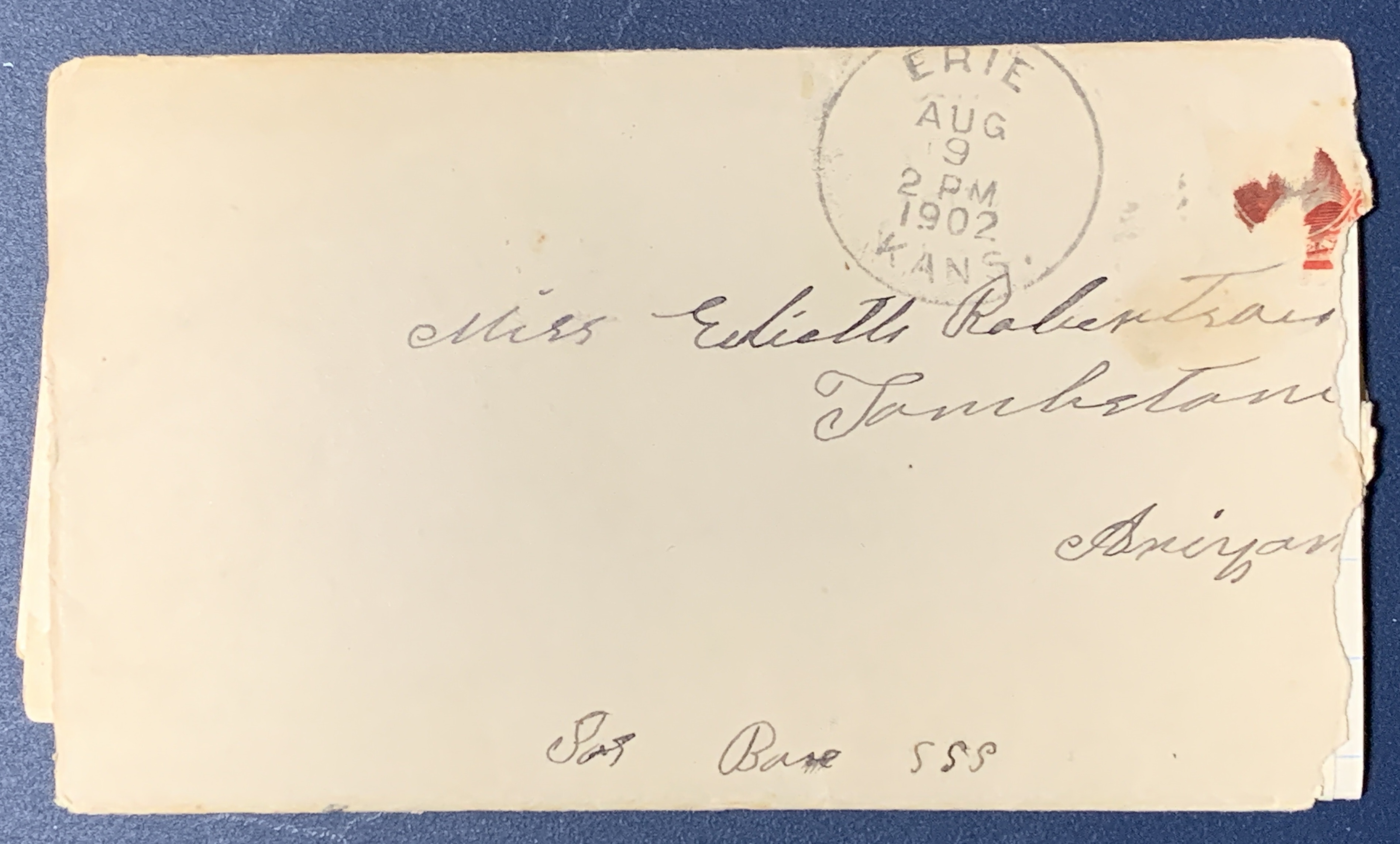
Cover addressed to Edith Robertson of Tombstone AZ postmarked Aug 9 1902 sent from grandmother Robertson-Gott in Erie KS
