= Wide Wide World =

American documentary television series

Cover of booklet created by NBC to promote Wide Wide World

Wide Wide World is a 1955–1958 90-minute documentary series telecast live on NBC on Sunday afternoons at 4pm Eastern. Conceived by network head Pat Weaver and hosted by Dave Garroway, Wide Wide World was introduced on the Producers' Showcase series on June 27, 1955. The premiere episode, featuring entertainment from the US, Canada and Mexico, was the first international North American telecast in the history of the medium.

It returned in the fall as a regular Sunday series, telecast from October 16, 1955 to June 8, 1958. The program was sponsored by General Motors and Barry Wood was the executive producer. Nelson Case was the announcer. In March 1956, Time magazine reported that it was the highest-rated daytime show on television.

Garroway was the host of the series which featured live remote segments from locations throughout North America and occasional reports on film from elsewhere in the world. The series carried live events into four million households. The October 16 premiere, "A Sunday in Autumn," featured 50 cameras in 11 cities, including a college campus, the fishing fleet at Gloucester, Massachusetts, rainswept streets in Manhattan and Monitor broadcasting in NBC's Radio Central studio. An appearance by Dick Button ice skating at Rockefeller Center was canceled because the rain had washed away the ice, and a curious coverage by a nervous Ted Husing of an attempt by Donald Campbell to break a speed record showed nothing more than his boat, on the other side of the lake, failing to take off. Time reviewed:

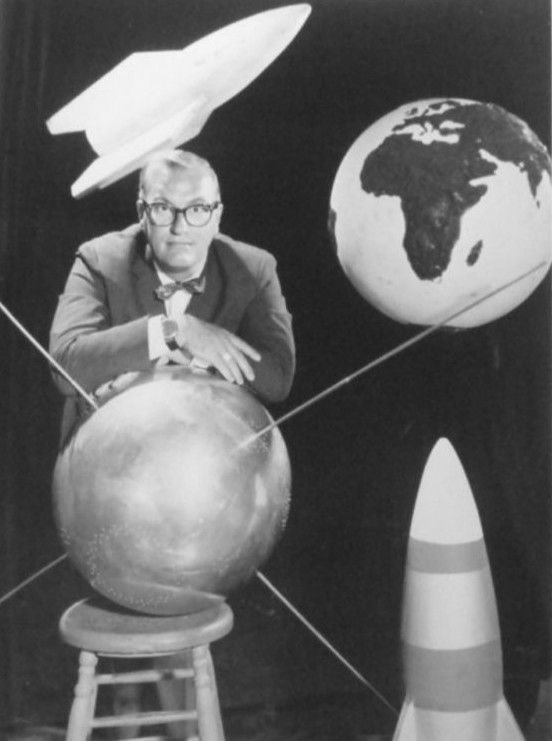
Publicity photo from the September 15, 1957 show, The Challenge of Space

NBC's Wide Wide World whisked its audience all over the map. The camera lazed its way down the Mississippi, poked into a New Jersey lane where lovers walked and old men raked autumn leaves, wandered around Gloucester harbor as fishermen mended nets. There were vivid contrasts between the chasm of the Grand Canyon and the topless towers of Rockefeller Center, the swaying wheat fields of Nebraska and the money-conscious hubbub of the Texas State Fair, an underwater ballet from Florida and the overwater speed trials of Donald Campbell's jet racer at Arizona's man-made Lake Mead. Always there was the immediacy of things happening this very minute, but the real brilliancy of Wide World may lie in its avoidance of the TV interview. The only one attempted, at the Texas Fair, proved again that—given a microphone and someone to interview—an announcer can turn any subject into a crashing bore. The words needed in Wide World were supplied by Dave Garroway and kept to a literate minimum.

Other episodes: "New Orleans" (February 2, 1958), "American Theater '58" (March 16, 1958), "Flagstop at Malta Bend" (March 30, 1958) and "The Museum of Modern Art" (April 27, 1958).

== History ==
According to host Dave Garroway, the fourth episode features the first live broadcast from a movie set, from the William Wyler film Friendly Persuasion, starring Gary Cooper and Dorothy McGuire.

=== 300,000 ducks ===
ESPN's Steve Bowman described the logistics involved in setting up a live remote at Arkansas' Claypool Reservoir where George Purvis, head of the Arkansas Game and Fish Commission, put 300,000 ducks on NBC:

There were many hurdles. Initially Purvis dealt with how to hide TV cameras, crews, control trucks and the necessary workmen and equipment and how to get electricity and telephone lines two miles (3 km) to the woods.

"To start with, the only way to get to the spot selected was over two miles (3 km) of muddy woods roads where only tractors had gone before," Purvis recalls. "The cameras would be two miles (3 km) from the nearest power line or telephone. This meant using power generators placed far enough back in the woods so as not to disturb the wary ducks. Six telephone circuits were needed to send the audio part of the program to New York.

"Even after stringing two miles (3 km) of wire there was just one circuit from Claypool's Reservoir to Jonesboro, 20 miles (32 km) away. So a radio loop was installed at the barn to cover the 20-mile (32 km) gap." Camouflaged blinds were built for television cameras and operators, one of which was 40 feet (12 m) up a hickory tree. An additional blind was built for the remote control truck.

The video would go from the camera to the control truck via the cable, then to an 80-foot (24 m) relay tower 1,000 feet (300 m) back in the woods, then 35 miles (56 km) to another relay tower, then 40 miles (64 km) to a third tower before being sent to Memphis. There it was transmitted 1,200 miles (1,900 km) to New York where the audio and video were combined to be broadcast live. With the electronics in place, the only thing left was to make sure that at an exact prearranged time there would be ducks in front of the cameras — over a quarter-of-a-million ducks.

Garroway, an inveterate music lover, lent his name to a series of recordings of jazz, classical music and pop released in the late 1950s and early 1960s, including Wide Wide World of Jazz.

=== Connection with ABC's Wide World of Sports ===
This television program was also the inspiration for ABC's Wide World of Sports. In the fall of 1960, ABC didn't have any other sports programming to air besides the college football games that Roone Arledge and Ed Scherick produced for the network; Arledge and play-by-play announcer Curt Gowdy were sitting in a hotel room near where one of the college football games they covered took place, brainstorming ideas for sports programming that the network could air the remainder of the year besides the college football games each fall; and Gowdy proposed a take on Wide Wide World that would feature sports of all kinds, well known and lesser-known from all corners of the globe. This idea eventually led to Wide World of Sports; Gowdy was tapped to be the program's host, but was obliged by his duties as the announcer for the Boston Red Sox during this time, and so Arledge hired Jim McKay from CBS as the program's host.

Gowdy did, however, appear in hunting and fishing segments with Arledge during the early years of Wide World of Sports; and this led to a spinoff by ABC into a program hosted by Gowdy specifically about hunting and fishing: The American Sportsman.

Gowdy later moved to NBC, where he became well known for calling the network's MLB coverage until 1975 and its NFL coverage until 1978.

== Selected episodes ==
October 30, 1955 - "Wide Wide West." Features scenes from across the American West, including Salt Lake City and the Mormon Tabernacle Choir; a gas-lit stage show in Las Vegas; Helldorado Week and Boot Hill Cemetery with Ethel Macia in Tombstone, Arizona; the Continental Divide; the Old Mission in Santa Barbara, California; and a rodeo at the Cow Palace in San Francisco.

November 27, 1955 – "America’s Heritage." Includes shots from San Francisco, New Orleans and lower Manhattan. Carlsbad Caverns is seen, as is Vancouver, British Columbia. Grandma Moses is seen painting in New York.

January 1, 1956 – "New Year’s Day." Scenes of New Year’s observances around the world are shown. Diplomats from various nations offer greetings for peace in the coming year.

January 22, 1956 – "Portrait of an American Winter." Children skating in Burlington, Vermont. Cameras captured live shots of Milwaukee, Palm Beach, Omaha, Niagara Falls and Valley Forge.

January 29, 1956 – "Two Ways to Winter." Seasonal festivities in two very different places – Minnesota and the Bahamas – are shown. The program includes the two governors shaking hands, courtesy a split-screen effect.

February 12, 1956 – "Abraham Lincoln." Tied to Lincoln’s birthday, Wide Wide World looks at the sixteenth president’s life and legacy.

April 15, 1956 – "In Pursuit of Happiness." Americans’ Sunday leisure activities are the topic of this broadcast. In Phoenix, people visit a dude ranch; beachcombers spend time on the shore at Hermosa Beach, California; and a concert in Seattle is shown.

September 30, 1956 – "The Hollywood Story." The history of Hollywood and its film industry. Walter Brennan, Debra Paget, Ginger Rogers and Roy Rogers are among those who make appearances to talk about the business of showbusiness.

October 14, 1956 – "The American Dream." An examination of industrial, scientific and cultural development in America. Includes shots of steel mills in Pittsburgh, preparations for an Antarctic expedition and the Rochester (NY) Symphony Orchestra. Music from Copland is played.

March 3, 1957 – "American Theater." Rehearsals for Tennessee Williams' Orpheus are shown. Williams sits down for an interview with himself, via special effects.

May 12, 1957 – "Armed Forces Week." Garroway narrates a taped piece on the function of the four branches of American military. Army, Navy, Marine Corps and Air Force training exercises are shown.

November 10, 1957 – "The Fabulous Infant." An historic joint broadcast among NBC, ABC and CBS, looking at the achievements of the then-young television industry. Clips from important news events are shown, as are representative samples of comedy, drama and children’s programs.

April 27, 1958 – "A Star’s Story." What does it mean to be a celebrity? Wide Wide World's cameras profile some of the era's stars, including Paul Newman and Joanne Woodward. Stars of the art world are also shown, and Garroway muses about what, exactly, makes a celebrity.

May 25, 1958 - "The Sound of Laughter" Features clips and commentary by Bob Hope, Steve Allen, Smith and Dale, Robert Benchley, Mort Sahl, Claude Rains, Al Capp and Peter Ustinov.

== See also ==
- Wild Wild World, a 1960 Merrie Melodies cartoon spoofing the program

== Watch ==
- Wide Wide World multiple segments from March 31, 1957 featuring Robert Frost on location in Shrewsbury, Vermont
- Wide Wide World segment showing 300,000 ducks in the air
- GM commercial on Wide Wide World
- Wide Wide World live coverage of a September 1957 rehearsal for NBC's Matinee Theatre
