= The Chinese Must Go: A Farce in Four Acts =

Play by Henry Grimm

- Original language: English
- Written by: Henry Grimm
- Subject: Anti-Chinese sentiment in the United States
- Setting: California

Premiere
- Date: 1879
- Place: Tucson

The Chinese Must Go: A Farce in Four Acts is an 1879 play by Henry Grimm concerning labor in California during the 1870s, particularly the conflict between Chinese and white laborers. Despite the play's setting, there is no record of it being performed in California. It was first performed in Tucson, Arizona at the Birdcage Theater. The play is most notable for reflecting the negative view of Chinese immigrants in California during this period.

== Characters ==
- William Blaine – A tailor, the main character
- Dora Blaine – Blaine's wife
- Frank Blaine – Blaine's son
- Lizzy Blaine – Blaine's daughter
- Captain Julius Turtlesnap – Lizzy's wealthy but dim-witted forty-year-old lover
- Reverend Howard Sneaker – A Reverend described as a ‘fraud’ who treated workers poorly whom Lizzy is smitten
- Jack Flint – A white man born and raised in Hong Kong to English parents
- Slim Chunk Pin – Member of the Chinese Six Companies and aids in solving disputes between Chinese workers and employers
- Ah Coy – An insolent and temperamental Chinese immigrant who is denied money by the Blaine family
- Lam Woo – A Chinese immigrant who does the Blaine family's washing
- Sam Gin – An older Chinese immigrant who buys a wash house business

== Plot ==
=== Act 1 ===
Ah Coy and Sam Gin, two Chinese workers, sit in Frank Blaine's kitchen and complain about the laziness and lack of self-discipline white American workers have. They claim Chinese workers deserve the jobs over American workers due to their willingness to accept lower wages.

William Blaine, Ah Coy and Sam Gin's employer, complains to the Chinese workers about what he sees as the large amount of money they charge for their services, claiming that they are the reason money is tight for the Blaines and storms out. Lizzy enters, searching for her brother. Ah Coy offers her his pipe, which she readily accepts, and she falls asleep. Dora and Lam Woo enter discussing Woo's wage for doing the Blaine family's washing, Dora claiming that sixteen dollars is too high. Slim Chunk Pin, a member of the Chinese Six Companies, orders Dora to pay Lam Woo for his services as well as Ah Coy for his.

Pin then berates Coy for his temperament towards the Blaine family and uses Gin as an example of what a 'good' Chinese working immigrant looks like. While asking about his savings and plans to buy his own wash house business, Pin suggests buying a Chinese prostitute to be his wife to put a good front up for customers who want a family-run business.

William re-enters the kitchen where Pin demands that the Blaines pay for the services they received from the Chinese workers. Frank Blaine, William's son, enters and is outraged by the demand. Calling Pin a 'slave dealer', he then beats him until he leaves the house.

Frank then claims that this is 'one way to make them go'.

=== Act 2 ===
William Blaine thinks his son is falling into idleness and becoming lazy and finds him work as a blackboot. Frank dismisses this idea, claiming it is beneath him, William tells him that this is the only work he can think of that is not monopolized by the Chinese.

Lizzy is enamoured by the Reverend Howard Sneaker, despite being involved with Captain Julius Turtlesnap, a rich but dim-witted man who Lizzy does not care for but meets the approval of her family. Frank dislikes Sneaker greatly due to Sneaker looking down on the workers to be able to appeal to the rich.

Frank then decides that in absence of a job, he will crossdress as his sister, Lizzy, to deceive her two wealthy suitors and have them give him money thinking they are buying Lizzy's affections. His plan succeeds.

=== Act 3 ===
William and Dora get ready to have dinner with Reverend Sneaker, who is William's old school friend. William shares his distaste and dislike for Sneaker who he believes assisted the 'hordes of Chinese onto our shore' due to his encouragements and involvement with the Chinese missionary program.

Lizzy enters and William asks her whether she would like to marry a Chinese laborer, when Lizzy says yes, William berates her and claims that olive oil and water do not mix, the lighter must always be on top. Lizzy then claims they are better workers than the Americans, citing the Blaines' weed-ridden farm as a prime example of American laziness and storms out.

Days later, after Lizzy had seemingly suffered from illness (called 'Chinese fever' by William and Dora) she encounters Frank and thanks him for driving the Chinese out of their house. Despite her previous sympathies towards Chinese labourers, she claims that doing the housework herself caused a cure to her fatigue, gave her an appetite and cured her of her illness.

Frank then tells Lizzy of Sam Gin opening his own wash house and has 'bought' a wife from China to help run his business with him, Frank decided to ask Jack Flint about it, as he was raised in Hong Kong and knows the Chinese culture well.

=== Act 4 ===
Frank propositions Jack into intercepting Gin's wife when she arrives off the boat from China as Jack can read, write and speak Mandarin. They wish to use this as a way of getting back at Gin for leaving the Blaines' employment and at Slim Chunk Pin for demanding they pay.

Flint poses as a Chinese delivery man who intercepts the box Gin's wife is kept in and demands $200 fee to hand it over to Gin, Gin pays Flint and receives the box. Frank, dressed as a Chinese woman, jumps from the box and taunts Gin.

Gin, who distraught not over the lack of wife he received but over parting with his money, cries over his lost money and runs away.

== Themes ==
=== Labor ===
The conflict between the whites and Chinese in reference to labor throughout the play is seen none more clearly than in the title of the play. 'The Chinese Must Go' is a slogan from the Workingmen's Party of California, founded in 1877, which was a white labor union focusing on promoting anti-Chinese legislation. This was due to the fear of white workers losing their jobs to Chinese laborers who were willing to work for lower wages.

=== Anti-Chinese sentiment ===
The play employs a number of racial stereotypes to belittle the Chinese workers and those sympathetic to the Chinese. This includes depicting the Chinese workers as having very basic English skills, with every Chinese character talking in Chinese Pidgin English for the duration of the play, the implication being that Chinese immigrants are intellectually inferior.

Another stereotype is that of Chinese workers bringing opium to the United States which is depicted through Ah Coy's constant offering of his opium pipe to Lizzy Blaine, which makes her sluggish.

The feminisation of Asian men is seen with the Chinese workers only performing 'womanly duties', for example Lam Woo's laundry service, traditionally seen as a woman's job. This is an exaggeration of the number of Chinese workers employed in domestic services. In San Francisco in the 1870s, within the roughly 12,000 Chinese workers only 2,500 were in domestic services, and the rest mainly worked on the railroads.

The play also portrays the Chinese as money hungry, as the Chinese immigrants fight to be paid their low salary and Gin is more distressed over losing his money than losing his wife.

The production of the play also serves as a form of racism as the play details that it must be performed with an all-white cast. The cast portraying the Chinese immigrants must wear baggy, shapeless clothes, yellow their skin and tape their eyelids. This is akin to minstrel shows portraying caricatures of African Americans that were played by white people.
