= Bird Cage Theatre =

Former theater, now museum, in Arizona, US

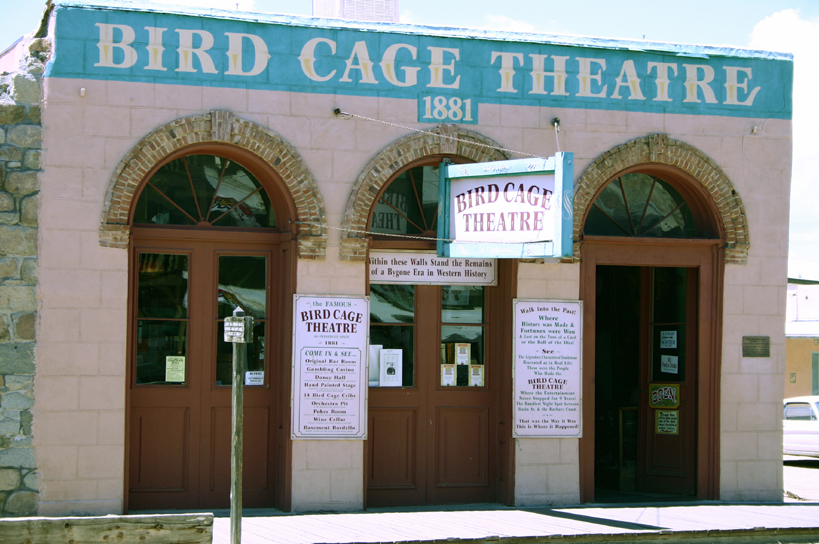

General information
- Type: Theatre
- Architectural style: Victorian
- Location: Tombstone, Arizona, United States, 535 E Allen St, Tombstone, AZ 85638, US
- Coordinates: 31°42′43″N 110°3′55″W
- Opened: December 26, 1881
- Closed: 1892; reopened in 1929 for the first Helldorado Days; reopened in 1934

Website
- https://tombstonebirdcage.com/

The Bird Cage Theatre was a theater in Tombstone, Arizona, United States. It operated intermittently from December 1881 to 1894. When the silver mines closed, the theatre was also closed in 1892. It was leased as a coffee shop starting in 1934.

== History ==
The Bird Cage Theatre opened on December 26, 1881. It was owned by Lottie and William "Billy" Hutchinson. Hutchison, a variety performer, originally intended to present respectable family shows like he had seen in San Francisco that were thronged by large crowds. After the Theatre opened, they hosted a Ladies Night for the respectable women of Tombstone, who could attend for free. But the economics of Tombstone did not support their aspirations. They soon canceled the Ladies Night and began offering baser entertainment that appealed to the rough mining crowd.

The walls of the Bird Cage were riddled with gunshot holes from shooting by gunfighters of the American frontier. There were 12 balcony boxes where prostitutes worked.

=== Entertainment ===
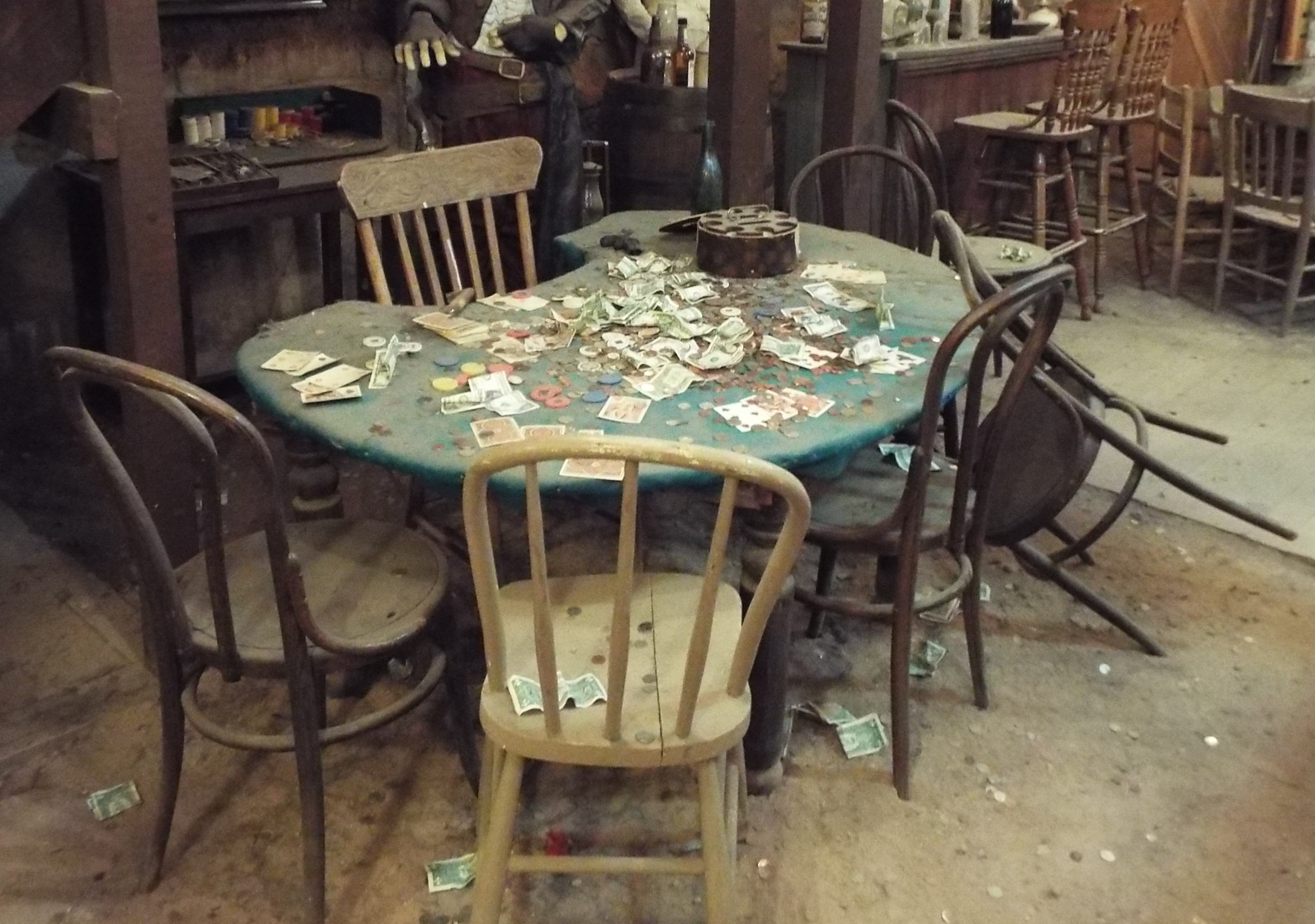
Bird Cage Poker Table where the longest poker game was played

One of the first acts at the Bird Cage was Mademoiselle De Granville (Alma Hayes), also known as the "Female Hercules" and "the woman with the iron jaw". She performed feats of strength, specializing in picking up heavy objects with her teeth. Other acts included the Irish comic duo Burns and Trayers (John H. Burns and Matthew Trayers); comic singer Irene Baker; Carrie Delmar, a serious opera singer; and comedian Nola Forest. Entertainment included masquerade balls featuring cross-dressing entertainers, like comedians David Waters and Will Curlew. Miners could drink and dance all night if they chose.

One of the prime entertainments at the Bird Cage Theatre was Cornish wrestling competitions, with the results being regularly published in the UK.

Stage magic shows were also popular at the Bird Cage with one magician saying he could catch bullets with his teeth and barely escaping with his life when someone who was not part of the show challenged him.

=== Closing ===
In March 1882, miners in the Grand Central Mine hit water at 620 feet (190 m). The flow wasn't at first large enough to stop work, but constant pumping with a 4-inch (100 mm) pump was soon insufficient. The silver ore deposits they sought were soon underwater. Hutchinson sold the Bird Cage to Hugh McCrum and John Stroufe. Bignon had managed the Theatre Comique in San Francisco and performed as a blackface minstrel and clog dancer. He refurbished the building and renamed it the Elite Theatre. He hired new acts. Bignon's wife, known as "Big Minnie", was 6 feet (1.8 m) tall and weighed 230 pounds (100 kg). She wore pink tights and sang, danced, and played the piano.

The large Cornish engines brought in by the mine owners kept the water pumped out of the mines for a few more years, but on May 26, 1886, the Grand Central Mine hoist and pumping plant burned. When the price of silver slid to 90 cents an ounce a few months later, the remaining mines laid off workers. Many residents of Tombstone left. The Bird Cage Theatre closed in 1892.

== Haunting ==
The theater is reported to be haunted. It was featured in the paranormal investigation shows Ghost Hunters in 2006. It was also featured in the Discovery Channel show Ghost Adventures on two separate investigations, once in 2009 and again in 2015.

== In popular culture ==
The theatre is featured in the movie Tombstone, a 1993 American Western film, about the lives of Wyatt Earp, Virgil Earp, Morgan Earp, and Doc Holliday.

== Gallery ==
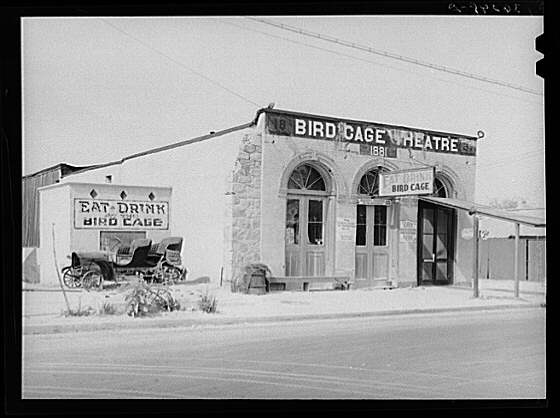
The Bird Cage circa 1940

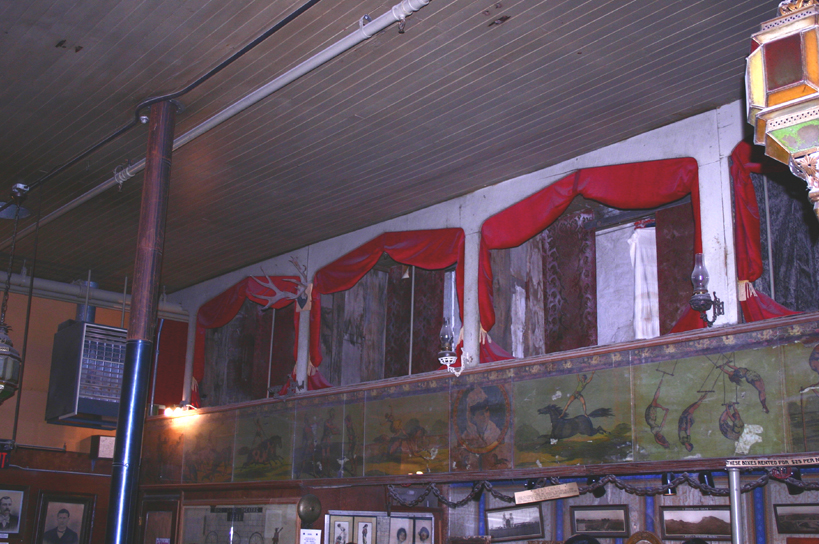
The cribs. The working girls rooms.

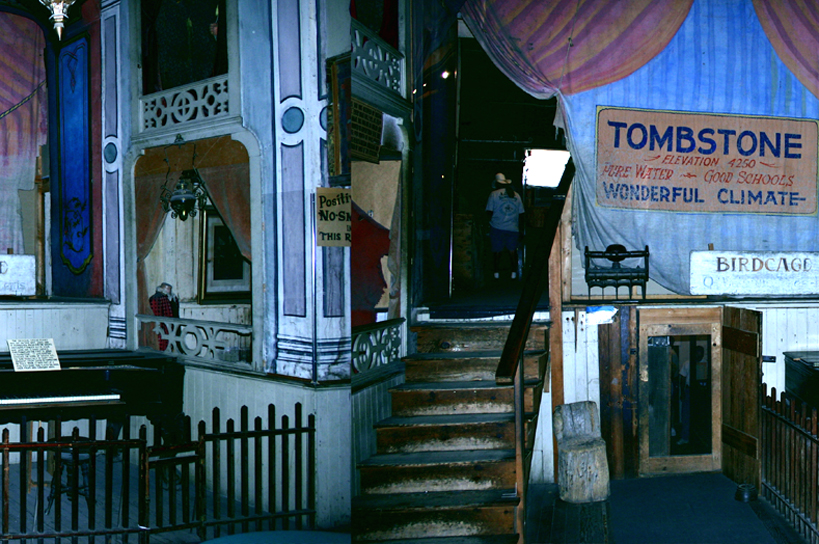
Stage

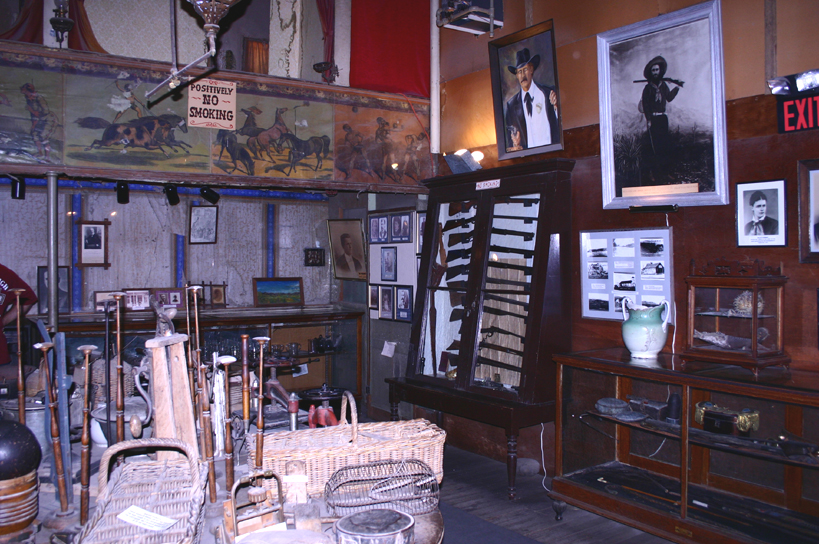
Museum

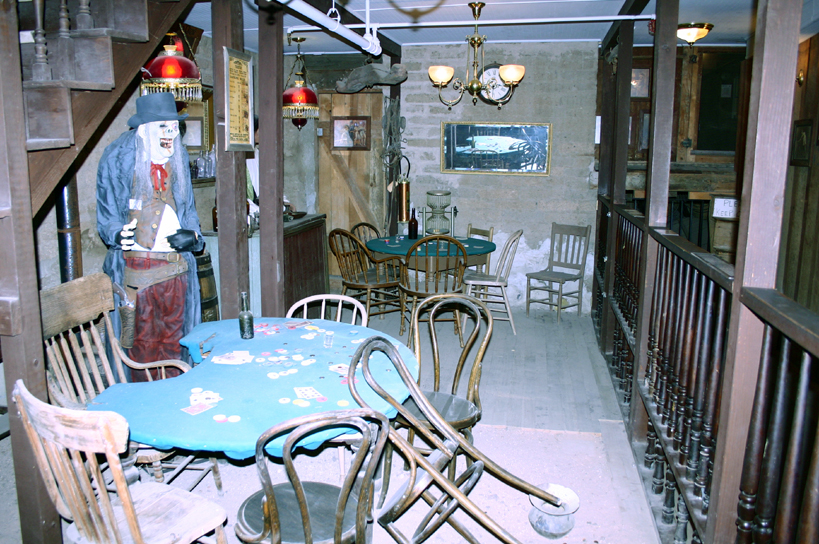
The basement poker room

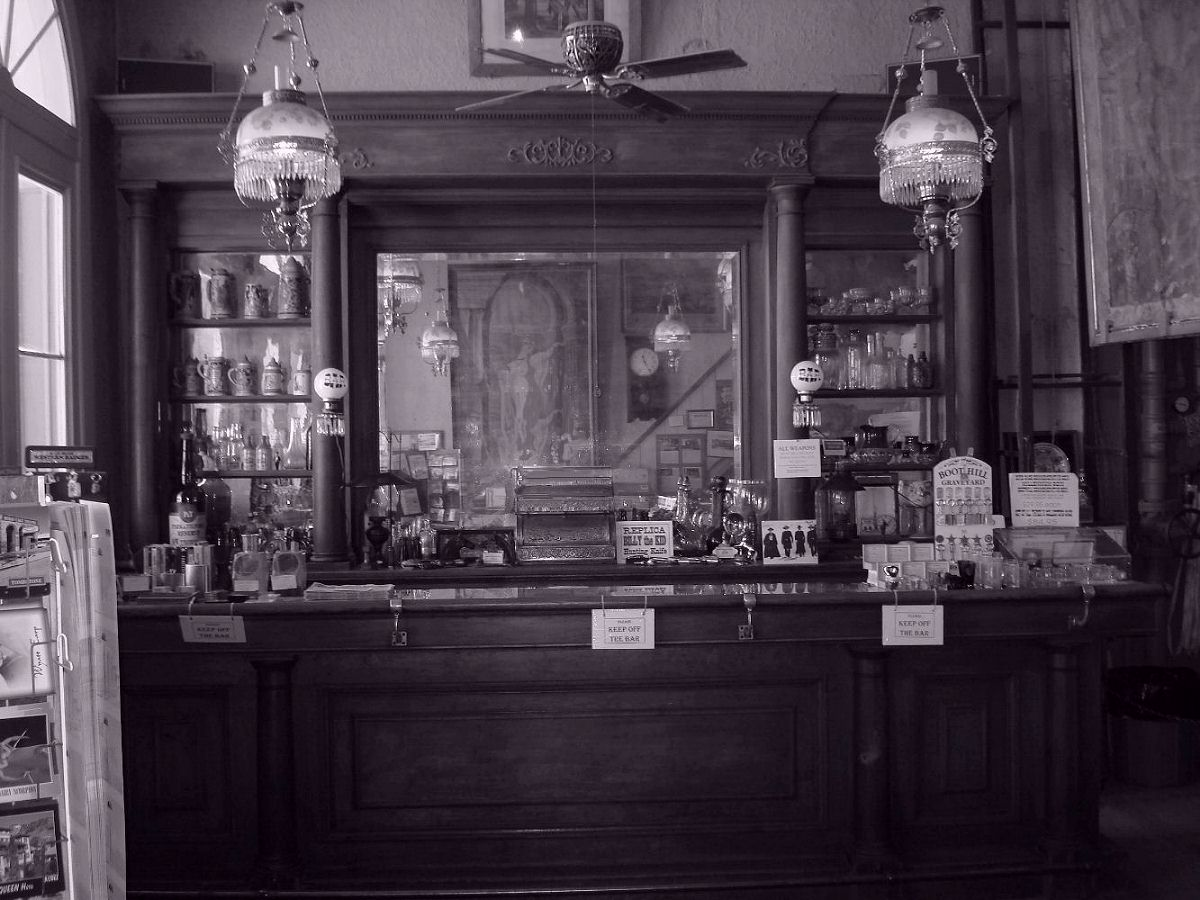
Although not the original bar to the theatre, this is an original Bar to Tombstone. It was placed here in 1935, where the original bar stood.

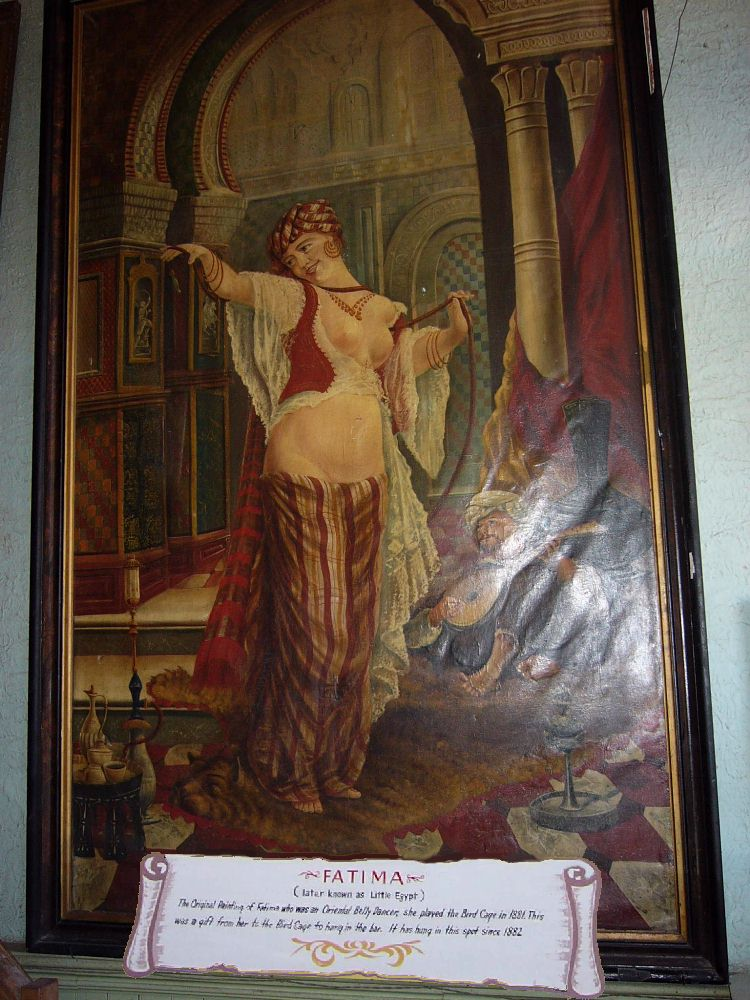
A portrait of Fatima, who belly-danced at the Bird Cage, decorated the bar since 1882.

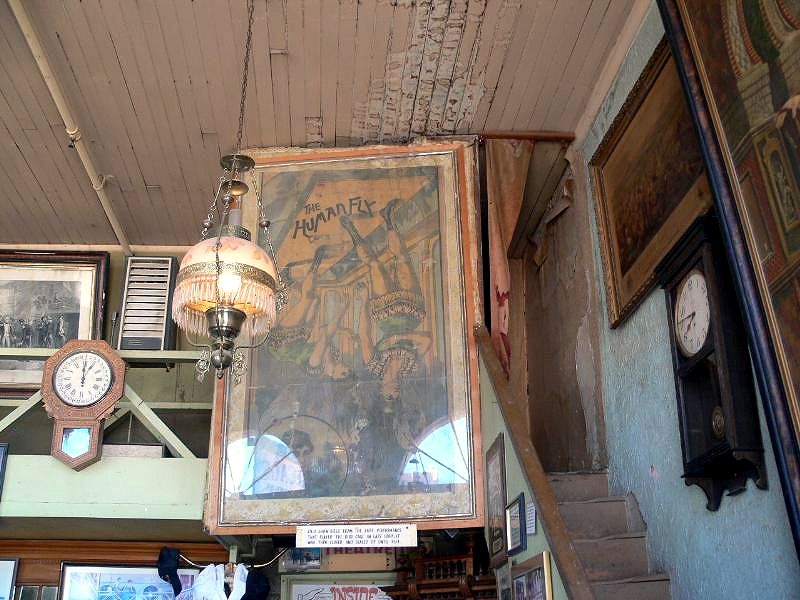
Staircase to the Birdcage box seats

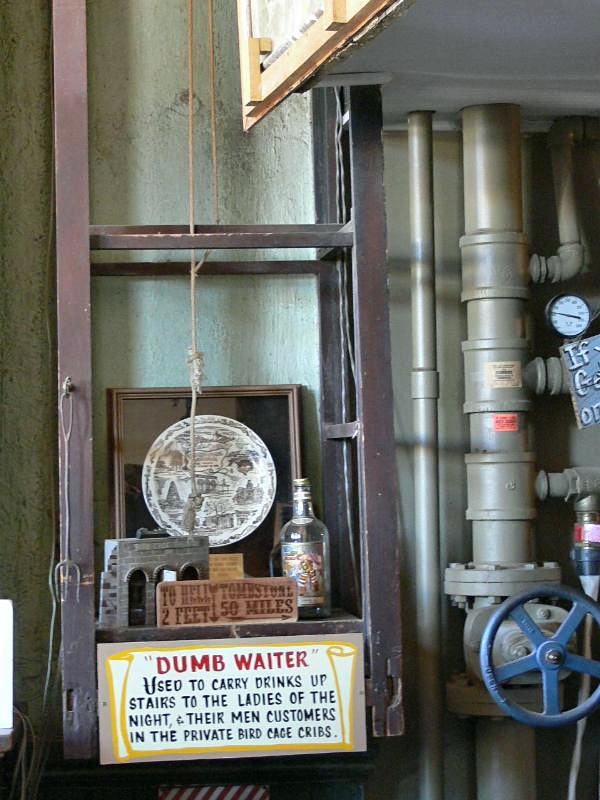
The dumbwaiter

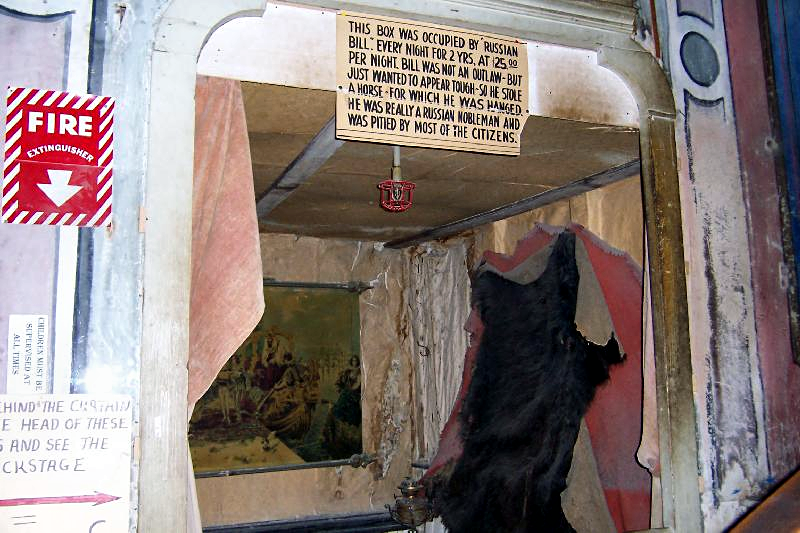
One of the box seats

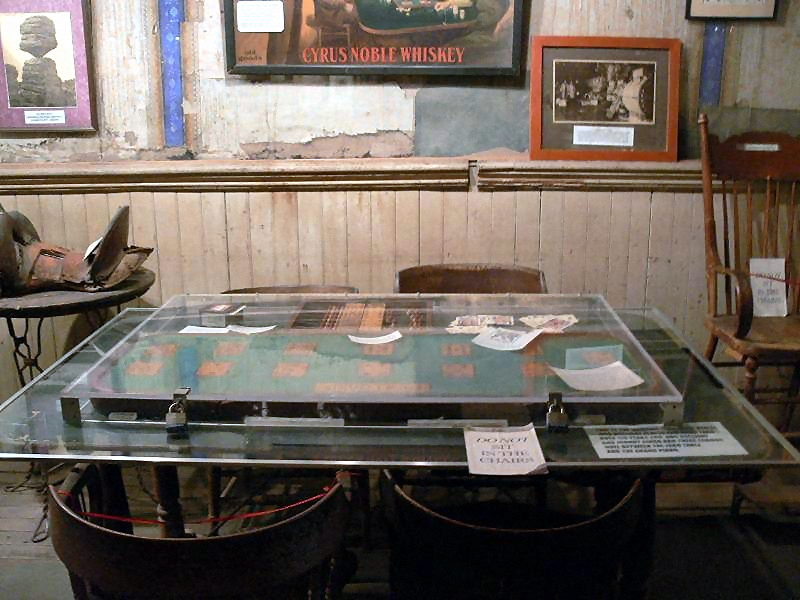
The original faro table

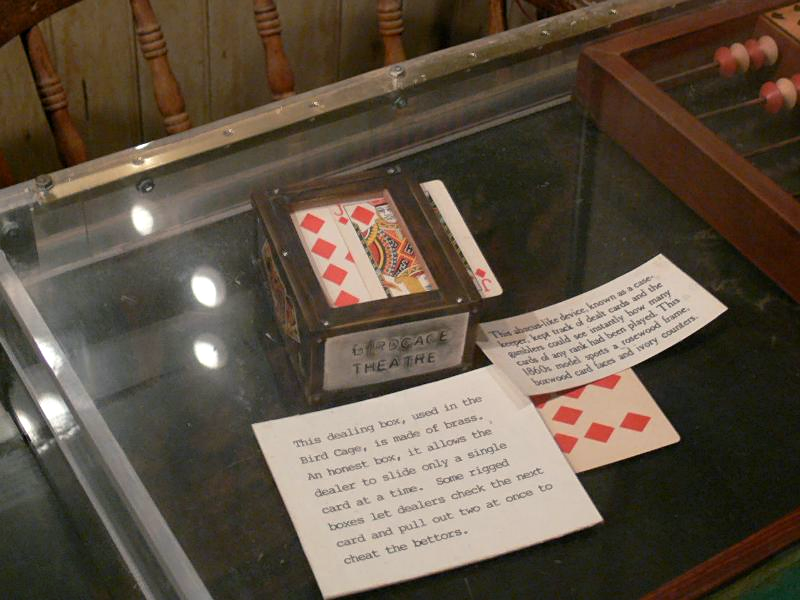
The faro table's "honest box"

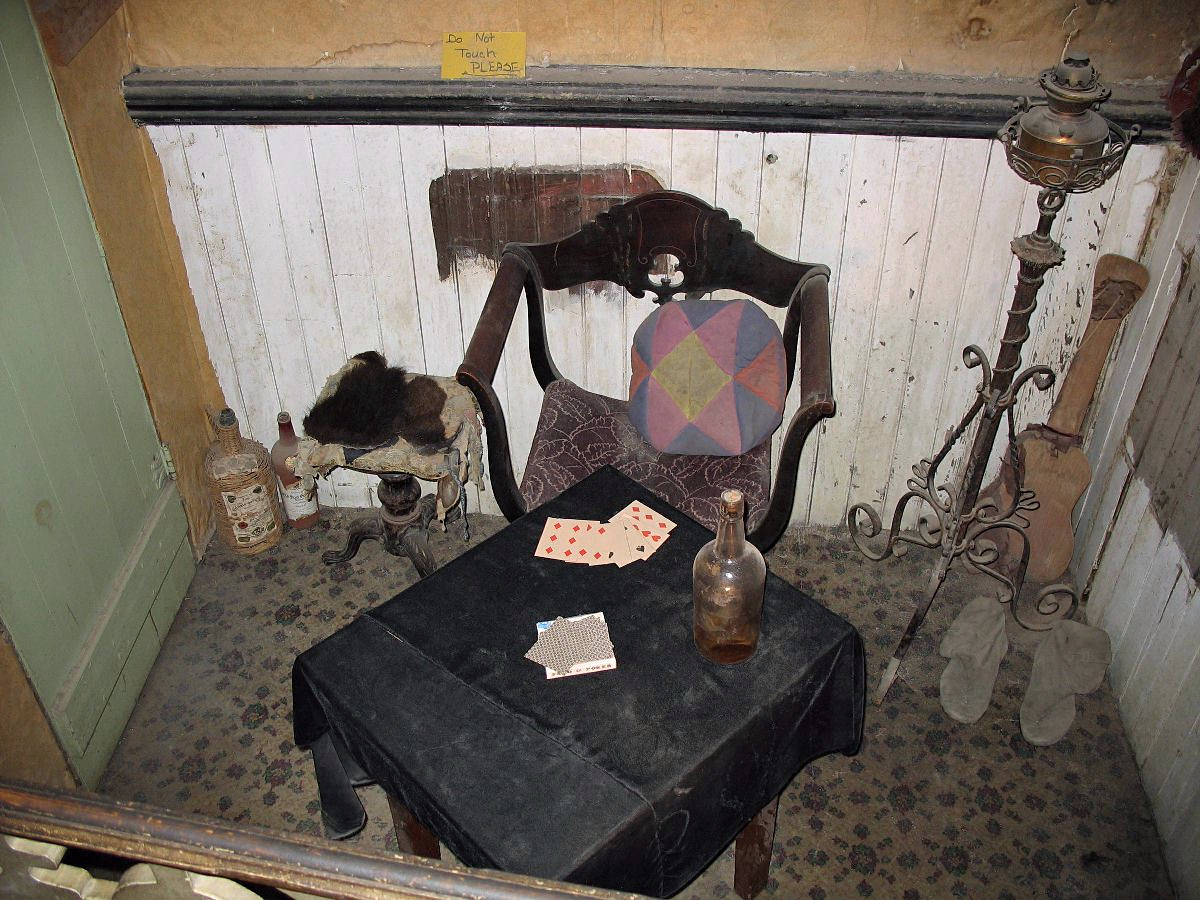
Box seat

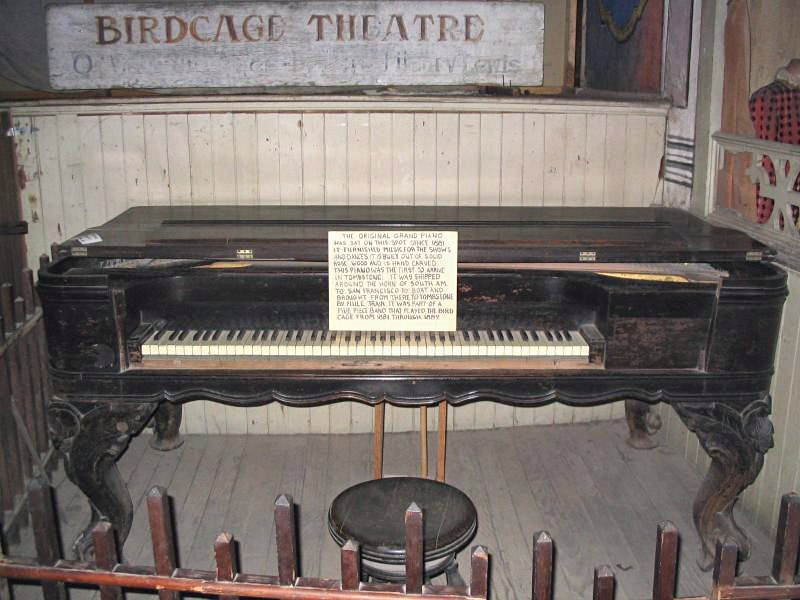
The original 1881 rosewood piano sits before the stage.

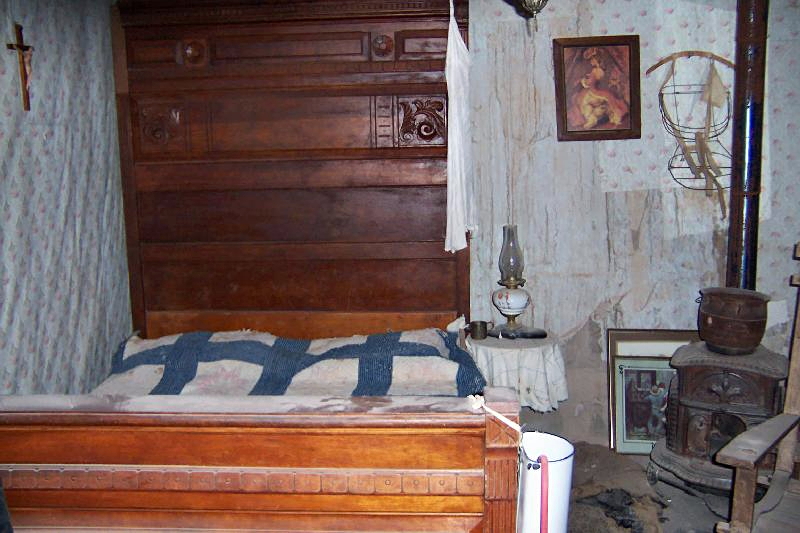
One of the two downstairs dressing rooms
