= Ethel Robertson Macia =

Arizona pioneer (1881–1964)

- Photograph taken around 1901
- Born: Ethel Maud Robertson; August 16, 1881; Tombstone, Arizona Territory, U.S.
- Died: August 3, 1964 (aged 82); Tombstone, Arizona
- Burial place: Tombstone Cemetery
- Occupations: Businesswoman; community historian; preservationist
- Known for: Preservation of Tombstone history; ownership of the Rose Tree Inn; promotion of the world's largest rose tree
- Spouse: Bert Macia (m. 1904)
- Children: 3
- Parent(s): Samuel Christy (Chris) and Alice Madora Robertson
- Relatives: Edith Alice Macia (sister)

Ethel Maud Robertson Macia (née Robertson; August 16, 1881 – August 3, 1964) was a pioneer of Arizona who served as a community historian and preservationist of Tombstone, Arizona. Known as the "first lady of Tombstone", she was the owner of the Rose Tree Inn, whose rose tree located on its grounds she promoted as the worlds largest of its kind.

== Early life and education ==
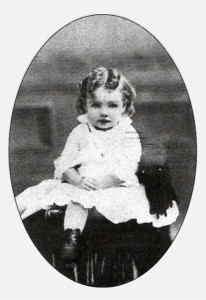
Ethel in 1883 around 2 years old.

Ethel was born on August 16, 1881, in Tombstone, Arizona to parents Samuel Christy (Chris) and Alice Madora Robertson. Chris and Alice were married on October 19, 1880 and had traveled by wagon train from St. Joseph, Missouri via Leadville, Colorado to Tombstone, Arizona Territory. They arrived in Tombstone on December 24, 1880 after traveling 1,000 miles in two months and three days and remained residents of Cochise County until their deaths. Her mother died November 5, 1895 three days after the birth of her eight child, Ashley Robertson. Alice Robertson was 31 years old. Ethel and the family moved to Pearce, Arizona in June 1896.

Ethel had just started 8th grade when her mother died and she was forced to leave school.

She spent one year taking courses at the preparatory school at the University of Arizona in Tucson. Early in her second year of courses her father requested that she return to Pearce to help the family.

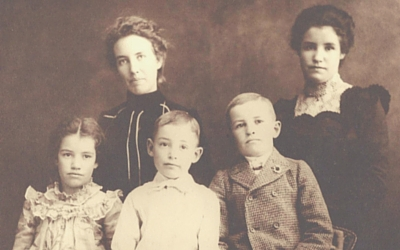
The Robertson children, Ethel at back left. Siblings from left to right, Olive, Curtis, Ralph, and Edith.

Her father was murdered in front of his place of business in Pearce on October 23, 1899 by Sidney R. Page, son of Judge Page of Wilcox, Arizona. He was sentenced to 20 years in prison and was released on parole after serving seven years, and receiving three years for good behavior. Following the death of their father, Ethel the eldest and her four minor siblings were declared wards of the court and moved back to the family home in Tombstone in 1899.

== Career and community service ==
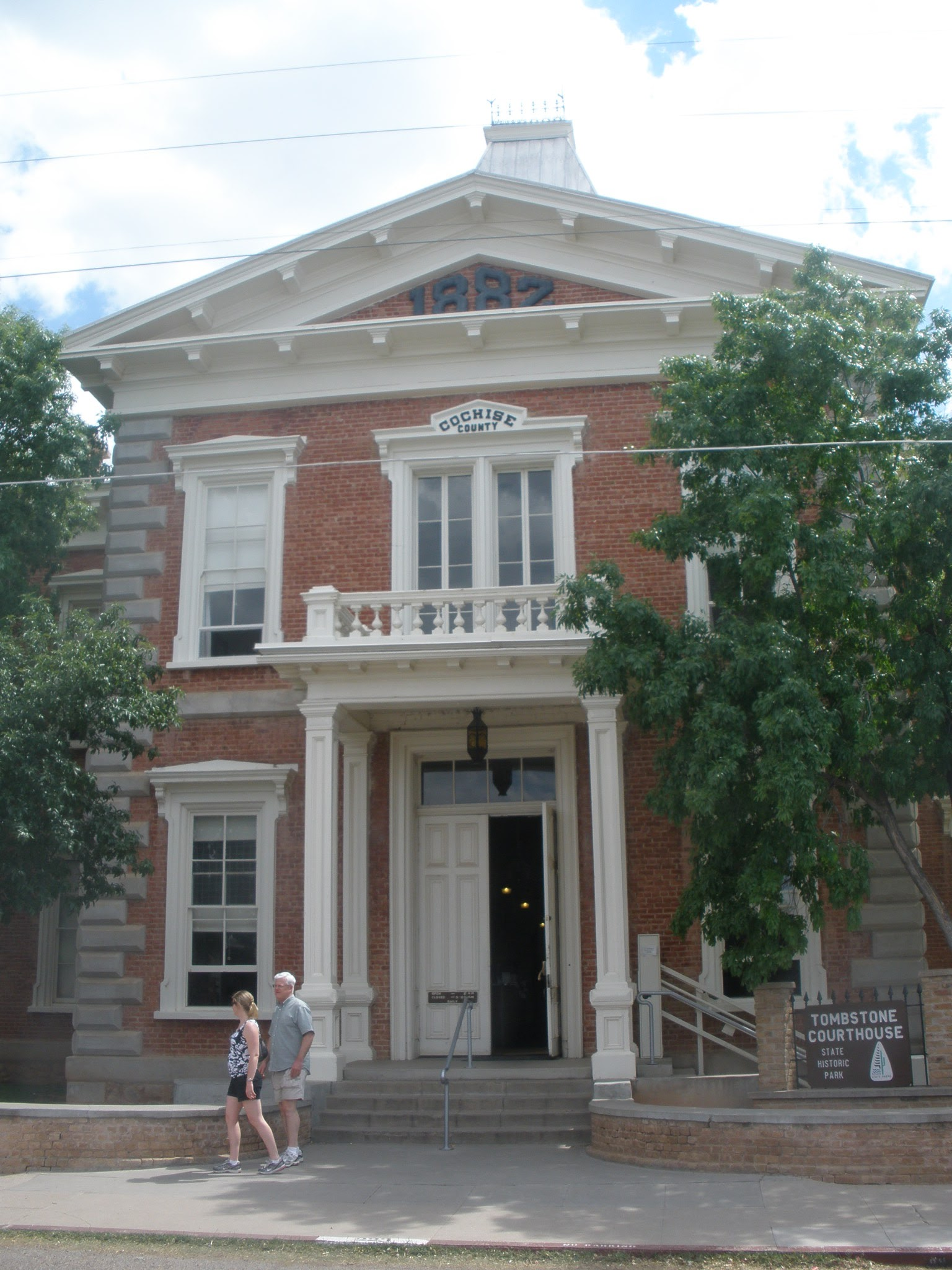
Exterior of the Tombstone Courthouse State Historic Park.

She worked in the Cochise County Courthouse in Tombstone, recording tax rolls along with her sister Edith. On February 1, 1902, Ethel and her siblings purchased from $1,000 a home at what would become 104 West Fremont, a building which was previously owned in 1881 by the Wyatt and Virgil Earp. She took in children boarders whose parents lived outside Tombstone working at nearby mines.

On February 4, 1904, she married James Herbert Macia Sr., who was a mine superintendent of the Tombstone Consolidated Mining and Milling Company.

Ethel and Bert had two daughters, Iris Ivey Macia (June 8, 1908) and Jeanne Harriet Macia (August 6, 1914) and a son, Col J. H. Macia Jr. (April 10, 1916) who served in World War II as part of the Doolittle Raid on Tokyo in 1942.

In 1919, Ethel and Bert purchased the Arcade Hotel (built in 1878) and operated it as a boardinghouse. A guest staying at the hotel in 1885 shared root cuttings of a white rose called the Lady Banksia Rose (banksiae alba-elena) with the owners who planted them in the hotel's courtyard. The rose tree grew so large that in 1937, Ethel renamed her business the Rose Tree Inn. The rose tree was claimed to be the largest in the world by Ripley's Believe it or Not (1936) and Guinness World Records.

Ethel was an active member of the Arizona Pioneer Historical Society, serving as Vice President.

In 1929, she also served as a charter member of the Tombstone Restoration Commission and of Helldorado, Incorporated. Helldorado Days is an annual celebration held every year in October. As part of her work with the Tombstone Restoration Commission, Ethel helped secure the Tombstone Courthouse as part of the first year plan (1959–1960) of the Arizona State Parks Board to become a state monument.

She served as the local representative of the Arizona Children's Home in Tucson. for more than 30 years.

Ethel served two terms as president of the Tombstone Women's Club and wrote a history of the Arizona State Federation of Women's Clubs.

== Later life ==
In 1941, the Macias sold the Inn to their daughter, Jeanne and her husband Burton Devere. They operated the building as a hostelry until 1954 and then turned it into their home where Ethel resided until she was hospitalized in 1964.

Ethel developed a large library of books on Arizona history, many of which acknowledge her help in substantiating historic claims. Notable examples include: "Tombstone" by Walter Noble Burns, "Helldorado" by William Breakenridge, "Frontier Marshal" by Stuart N. Lake, and "Tombstone" and "Arizona" by Clarence Buddington Kelland.

Her husband Bert Macia died April 1, 1951 in Phoenix, Arizona.

== Awards and honors ==
In 1953, Ethel was selected as the Queen of Helldorado at the age of 72.

In 1955, she was featured on Wide Wide World a 90-minute documentary series telecast live on NBC. The episode was broadcast October 23, 1955 and featured Tombstone as the "Town Too Tough to Die." Ethel dressed in a vintage gown sat among the old timers buried in Boothill Graveyard, and recounted stories about those she had known and those she had only heard about, such as Wyatt Earp.

In 2008, she was added to the Rose Garden Honorees List at the Sharlot Hall Museum in Prescott, Arizona.

In 2010, she was inducted into the Tombstone Founders' Day Hall of Fame.

== Death ==
Ethel died on August 3, 1964 at Tombstone General Hospital. Her funeral services were held on August 6, 1964 at St. Paul's Episcopal Church and she was buried at Tombstone Cemetery.
