= William H. Robinson =

American Engineer

William Hugh Robinson
- Education: Florida A&M University; Georgia Institute of Technology College of Computing
- Scientific career
- Workplaces: Vanderbilt University
- Thesis: Modeling and implementation of an integrated pixel processing tile for focal plane systems (2003-12-01)

William Hugh Robinson is an American engineer who is Professor of Electrical Engineering and Vice Provost for Academic at Vanderbilt University. His research considers sophisticated computer systems for consumer and industrial use. He is an advocate for improving access to engineering, and leads several investigations into programmes that better support people from marginalised groups.

== Early life and education ==
Robinson studied electrical engineering at the Florida A&M University. He was a graduate student at the Georgia Institute of Technology College of Computing, where he earned a master's degree and a doctorate. His doctoral research was in the portable image computation architecture group of D. Scott Wills. Robinson earned his PhD in 2003, where was made an Assistant Professor of Engineering.

== Research and career ==
Robinson leads the Security And Fault Tolerance (SAF-T) Research group at Vanderbilt University. In particular, his work focuses on the design and implementation of computing systems for industrial and medical applications. In these systems, Robinson makes use of information leakage to bridge the fields of computer networking and architecture. In 2010 Robinson was the first African-American to earn tenure in the department of engineering, and in 2018 became the first African-American to achieve tenure. Robinson is a two-time winner of the Florida A&M University alumni awards, in both the Young and Outstanding categories.

=== Academic service ===
Robinson has worked on several projects to improve diversity within science and engineering. He serves as chair of the 100 Black Men of Middle Tennessee, an organisation that looks to In 2016 he was awarded the Vanderbilt University Chancellor's Award for Research on Equity, Diversity and Inclusion. That year he was made Associate Dean. Robinson contributed to the book Diversifying STEM, which studied the intersection of race, gender and participation in science and engineering. Robinson leads the Vanderbilt University Explorations in Diversifying Engineering Faculty Initiative, a multi-disciplinary research programme that looks to better understand the factors that impact recruitment and retention of engineers who have been marginalised because of their race or gender. He was elected Chair of the Vanderbilt University Diversity Council in 2019. In this capacity, he leads the Academic Pathways programme which offers postdoctoral positions to researchers from marginalised groups. In June 2020 he was made Executive Director of the Vanderbilt University Provost's Office for Inclusive Excellence.

== Selected publications ==
- Narasimham, Balaji; Bhuva, Bharat L.; Schrimpf, Ronald D.; Massengill, Lloyd W.; Gadlage, Matthew J.; Amusan, Oluwole A.; Holman, William Timothy; Witulski, Arthur F.; Robinson, William H.; Black, Jeffrey D.; Benedetto, Joseph M. (2007). "Characterization of Digital Single Event Transient Pulse-Widths in 130-nm and 90-nm CMOS Technologies". IEEE Transactions on Nuclear Science. 54 (6): 2506–2511. Bibcode:2007ITNS...54.2506N. doi:10.1109/TNS.2007.910125. ISSN 1558-1578. S2CID 36176797.
- Narasimham, Balaji; Ramachandran, Vishwa; Bhuva, Bharat L.; Schrimpf, Ronald D.; Witulski, Arthur F.; Holman, William Timothy; Massengill, Lloyd W.; Black, Jeffery D.; Robinson, William H.; McMorrow, Dale (2006). "On-Chip Characterization of Single-Event Transient Pulsewidths". IEEE Transactions on Device and Materials Reliability. 6 (4): 542–549. Bibcode:2006ITDMR...6..542N. doi:10.1109/TDMR.2006.885589. hdl:1803/14887. ISSN 1558-2574. S2CID 2388113.
- Lauf, Adrian P.; Peters, Richard A.; Robinson, William H. (2010-05-01). "A distributed intrusion detection system for resource-constrained devices in ad-hoc networks". Ad Hoc Networks. 8 (3): 253–266. doi:10.1016/j.adhoc.2009.08.002. ISSN 1570-8705.
