= Helldorado Days (Tombstone) =

Annual festival held in Tombstone, Arizona

Helldorado Days is a festival that began in Tombstone, Arizona in 1929 and is held every year in October. In 2008, 30 different entertainment groups participated, including belly dancers, line dancers, and musical groups. There was also a parade.

== History ==
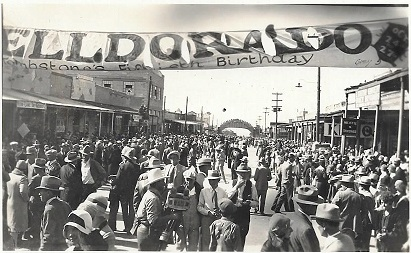
Helldorado 50th Anniversary of Tombstone Oct 24-27

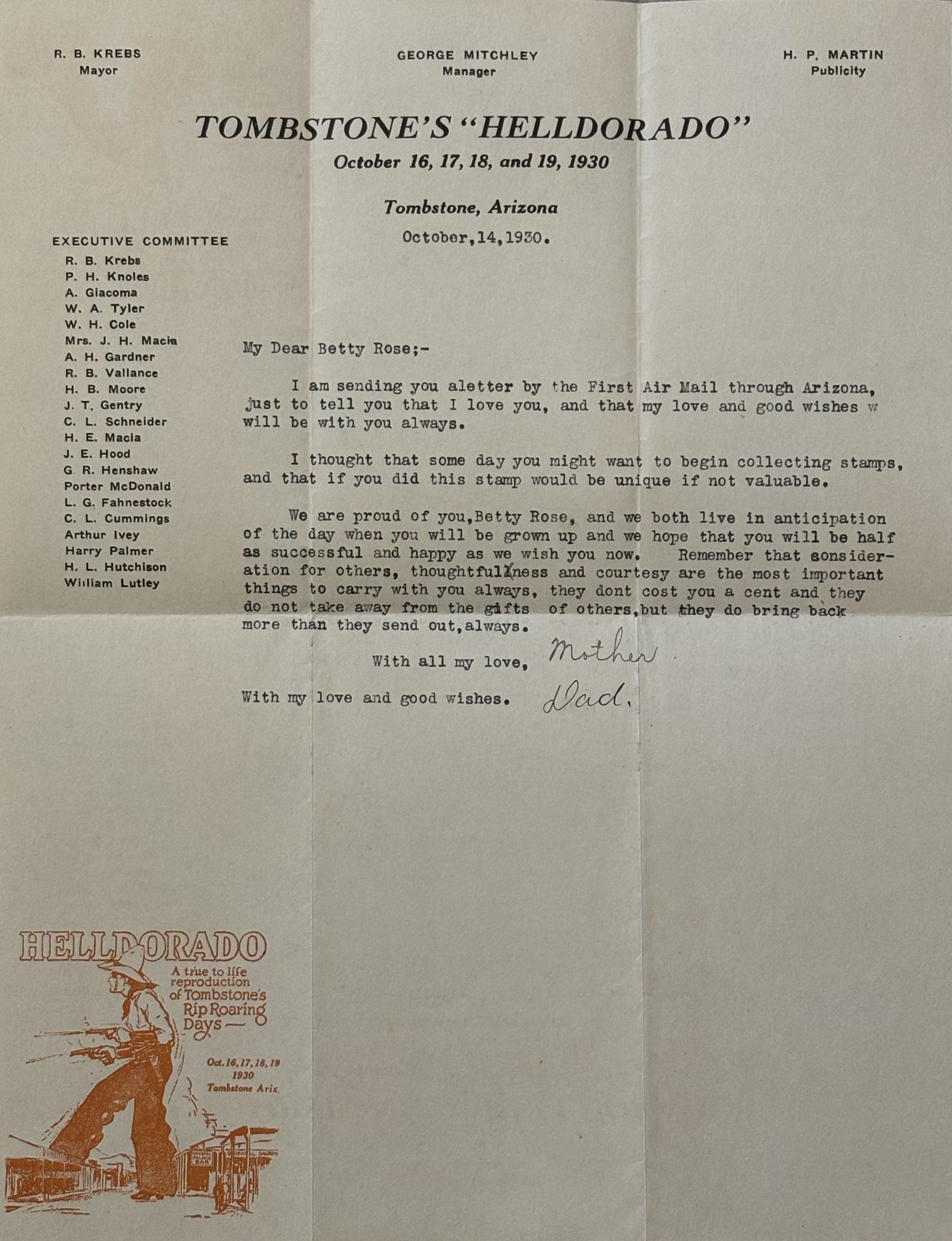
Tombstone's Helldorado Letter October 14, 1930.

Helldorado Days, started in 1929 to celebrate the fiftieth anniversary of the founding of Tombstone. The Tombstone Epitaph newspaper stated that - by staging historic reenactments, bringing’ back pioneers of the day, exhibiting artifacts of the day against the backdrop of Tombstone, “the show will be Tombstone.” Helldorado Days takes place on the 3rd complete weekend of October and is currently sponsored by Helldorado, Inc. whose membership is composed of residents in Cochise County, including Ethel Robertson Macia.
