= 2026 Arizona judicial election =

2026 election in Arizona, United States

One justice of the seven-member Arizona Supreme Court, 14 judges of the 28-member Arizona Court of Appeals, and 72 of the 183 judges on the Arizona Superior Court are up for retention by Arizona voters on November 3, 2026, concurrently with other state elections. Terms for Supreme Court and Court of Appeals are six years and terms for Superior Court are four years. These elections are nonpartisan.

== Judicial Reviews ==
The Arizona Commission on Judicial Performance reviews judges prior to their retention elections.

== Supreme Court ==
One member of the Arizona Supreme Court is up for retention.

Position	Incumbent	First appointed	Status	Vote
At-large	John Lopez IV	2016 (Note: Appointed by Governor Doug Ducey)	Incumbent retained in retention vote held November 3, 2026.	✓ Yes 59.3%; No 40.7%

== Court of Appeals ==
14 members of the Arizona Court of Appeals are up for retention

Position	Incumbent	First appointed	Status	Vote
Division 1	Andrew M. Jacobs	2023 (Note: Appointed by Governor Katie Hobbs)	Incumbent retained in retention vote held November 3, 2026.	✓ Yes 62.8%; No 37.2%
Division 1	Randall M. Howe	2012 (Note: Appointed by Governor Jan Brewer)	Incumbent retained in retention vote held November 3, 2026.	✓ Yes 69.5%; No 30.5%
Division 1	James B. Morse Jr.	2017	Incumbent retained in retention vote held November 3, 2026.	✓ Yes 59.4%; No 40.6%
Division 1	Jennifer M. Perkins	2017	Incumbent retained in retention vote held November 3, 2026.	✓ Yes 54.7%; No 45.3%
Division 1	David D. Weinzweig	2017	Incumbent retained in retention vote held November 3, 2026.	✓ Yes 52.7%; No 47.3%
Division 1	Michael S. Catlett	2022	Incumbent retained in retention vote held November 3, 2026.	✓ Yes 61.8%; No 38.2%
Division 1	Anni Hill Foster	2022	Incumbent not retained in retention vote held November 3, 2026.	✗ No 50.3%; Yes 49.7%
Division 1	Daniel J. Kiley	2022	Incumbent retained in retention vote held November 3, 2026.	✓ Yes 63.2%; No 36.8%
Division 2	Jeffrey L. Sklar	2022	Incumbent retained in retention vote held November 3, 2026.	✓ Yes 64.5%; No 35.5%
Division 2	Karl Eppich	2017	Incumbent retained in retention vote held November 3, 2026.	✓ Yes 73.0%; No 27.0%
Division 2	Sean Brearcliffe	2017	Incumbent retained in retention vote held November 3, 2026.	✓ Yes 54.8%; No 45.2%
Division 2	Lacey S. Gard	2022	Incumbent retained in retention vote held November 3, 2026.	✓ Yes 73.5%; No 26.5%
Division 2	Michael F. Kelly	2022	Incumbent retained in retention vote held November 3, 2026.	✓ Yes 64.8%; No 35.2%
Division 2	Christopher J. O'Neil	2022	Incumbent retained in retention vote held November 3, 2026.	✓ Yes 75.1%; No 24.9%

== Coconino County Superior Court ==
Two members of the Coconino County Superior Court are up for retention.

Position	Incumbent	First appointed	Status	Vote
Division 1	Ted Reed	2019	Incumbent retained in retention vote held November 3, 2026.	✓ Yes 76.0%; No 24.0%
Division 2	Joshua Steinlage	2024	Incumbent retained in retention vote held November 3, 2026.	✓ Yes 75.9%; No 24.1%

== Maricopa County Superior Court ==
48 members of the Maricopa County Superior Court are up for retention.

Position	Incumbent	First appointed	Status	Vote
At-large	Bradley Astrowsky	2012	Incumbent retained in retention vote held November 3, 2026.	✓ Yes 54.3%; No 45.7%
At-large	Michael C. Blair	2018	Incumbent retained in retention vote held November 3, 2026.	✓ Yes 72.0%; No 28.0%
At-large	John L. Blanchard	2019	Incumbent retained in retention vote held November 3, 2026.	✓ Yes 64.6%; No 35.4%
At-large	Robert I. Brooks	2020	Incumbent retained in retention vote held November 3, 2026.	✓ Yes 72.6%; No 27.4%
At-large	Sunita A. Cairo	2022	Incumbent retained in retention vote held November 3, 2026.	✓ Yes 73.6%; No 26.4%
At-large	Michelle Carson	2023	Incumbent retained in retention vote held November 3, 2026.	✓ Yes 62.3%; No 37.7%
At-large	Greg Como	2015	Incumbent retained in retention vote held November 3, 2026.	✓ Yes 64.7%; No 35.3%
At-large	Katherine M. Cooper	2011	Incumbent retained in retention vote held November 3, 2026.	✓ Yes 74.2%; No 25.8%
At-large	Max-Henri Covil	2020	Incumbent retained in retention vote held November 3, 2026.	✓ Yes 65.5%; No 34.5%
At-large	Kristin Culbertson	2016	Incumbent retained in retention vote held November 3, 2026.	✓ Yes 68.8%; No 31.2%
At-large	Marvin L. Davis	2020	Incumbent retained in retention vote held November 3, 2026.	✓ Yes 74.0%; No 26.0%
At-large	Monica B. Edelstein	2020	Incumbent retained in retention vote held November 3, 2026.	✓ Yes 63.7%; No 36.3%
At-large	Geoffrey Fish	2014	Incumbent retained in retention vote held November 3, 2026.	✓ Yes 72.3%; No 27.7%
At-large	Dewain Fox	2015	Incumbent retained in retention vote held November 3, 2026.	✓ Yes 72.8%; No 27.2%
At-large	Jillian B. Francis	2022	Incumbent retained in retention vote held November 3, 2026.	✓ Yes 72.6%; No 27.4%
At-large	Marischa H. Gilla	2023	Incumbent retained in retention vote held November 3, 2026.	✓ Yes 68.9%; No 31.1%
At-large	Jennifer Green	2014	Incumbent retained in retention vote held November 3, 2026.	✓ Yes 74.0%; No 26.0%
At-large	Lauren R. Guyton	2024	Incumbent retained in retention vote held November 3, 2026.	✓ Yes 62.8%; No 37.2%
At-large	Melody Garland Harmon	2023	Incumbent retained in retention vote held November 3, 2026.	✓ Yes 68.4%; No 31.6%
At-large	Michael J. Herrod	2011	Incumbent retained in retention vote held November 3, 2026.	✓ Yes 60.7%; No 39.3%
At-large	Charlene D. Jackson	2022	Incumbent retained in retention vote held November 3, 2026.	✓ Yes 56.3%; No 43.7%
At-large	Melissa I. Julian	2019	Incumbent retained in retention vote held November 3, 2026.	✓ Yes 64.5%; No 35.5%
At-large	Amy M. Kalman	2023	Incumbent retained in retention vote held November 3, 2026.	✓ Yes 61.7%; No 38.3%
At-large	Joseph S. Kiefer	2019	Incumbent retained in retention vote held November 3, 2026.	✓ Yes 71.3%; No 28.7%
At-large	Ronee K. Steiner	2015	Incumbent retained in retention vote held November 3, 2026.	✓ Yes 63.3%; No 36.7%
At-large	Joseph C. Kreamer	2007 (Note: Appointed by Governor Janet Napolitano)	Incumbent retained in retention vote held November 3, 2026.	✓ Yes 63.2%; No 36.8%
At-large	Kerstin G. LeMaire	2015	Incumbent retained in retention vote held November 3, 2026.	✓ Yes 71.2%; No 28.8%
At-large	Daniel G. Martin	2007	Incumbent retained in retention vote held November 3, 2026.	✓ Yes 59.9%; No 40.1%
At-large	Julie A. Mata	2020	Incumbent not retained in retention vote held November 3, 2026.	✗ No 51.4%; Yes 48.6%
At-large	Steven W. McCarthy	2023	Incumbent retained in retention vote held November 3, 2026.	✓ Yes 66.0%; No 34.0%
At-large	Frank W. Moskowitz	2014	Incumbent retained in retention vote held November 3, 2026.	✓ Yes 67.9%; No 32.1%
At-large	Samuel J. Myers	2007	Incumbent retained in retention vote held November 3, 2026.	✓ Yes 56.2%; No 43.8%
At-large	Suzanne M. Nicholls	2020	Incumbent retained in retention vote held November 3, 2026.	✓ Yes 60.6%; No 39.4%
At-large	Colleen E. O'Donnell-Smith	2023	Incumbent retained in retention vote held November 3, 2026.	✓ Yes 60.1%; No 39.9%
At-large	Jay Polk	2011	Incumbent retained in retention vote held November 3, 2026.	✓ Yes 72.8%; No 27.2%
At-large	Michael Z. Rassas	2020	Incumbent not retained in retention vote held November 3, 2026.	✗ No 50.7%; Yes 49.3%
At-large	Joshua D. Rogers	2015	Incumbent retained in retention vote held November 3, 2026.	✓ Yes 61.8%; No 38.2%
At-large	Jeffrey Rueter	2015	Incumbent retained in retention vote held November 3, 2026.	✓ Yes 72.0%; No 28.0%
At-large	Jennifer Ryan-Touhill	2014	Incumbent retained in retention vote held November 3, 2026.	✓ Yes 71.8%; No 28.2%
At-large	Aryeh D. Schwartz	2020	Incumbent retained in retention vote held November 3, 2026.	✓ Yes 69.9%; No 30.1%
At-large	Danielle J. Viola	2011	Incumbent retained in retention vote held November 3, 2026.	✓ Yes 74.5%; No 25.5%
At-large	Randall H. Warner	2007	Incumbent retained in retention vote held November 3, 2026.	✓ Yes 61.9%; No 38.1%
At-large	Joseph C. Welty	2007	Incumbent retained in retention vote held November 3, 2026.	✓ Yes 63.0%; No 37.0%
At-large	Chuck Whitehead	2015	Incumbent retained in retention vote held November 3, 2026.	✓ Yes 69.3%; No 30.7%
At-large	Paula A. Williams	2023	Incumbent retained in retention vote held November 3, 2026.	✓ Yes 62.5%; No 37.5%
At-large	William R. Wingard	2023	Incumbent retained in retention vote held November 3, 2026.	✓ Yes 63.3%; No 36.7%
At-large	Cassie B. Woo	2019	Incumbent retained in retention vote held November 3, 2026.	✓ Yes 53.8%; No 46.2%
At-large	Melissa M. Zabor	2023	Incumbent retained in retention vote held November 3, 2026.	✓ Yes 61.2%; No 38.8%

== Pima County Superior Court ==
Ten members of the Pima County Superior Court are up for retention.

Position	Incumbent	First appointed	Status	Vote
2	J. Alan Goodwin	2020	Incumbent retained in retention vote held November 3, 2026.	✓ Yes 63.4%; No 36.6%
4	Janet C. Bostwick	2016	Incumbent retained in retention vote held November 3, 2026.	✓ Yes 69.9%; No 30.1%
6	Danelle Liwski	2011	Incumbent retained in retention vote held November 3, 2026.	✓ Yes 67.5%; No 32.5%
15	Sandra M. Bensley	2024	Incumbent retained in retention vote held November 3, 2026.	✓ Yes 70.3%; No 29.7%
17	Catherine M. Woods	2011	Incumbent retained in retention vote held November 3, 2026.	✓ Yes 53.9%; No 46.1%
19	Kathleen A. Quigley	2012	Incumbent retained in retention vote held November 3, 2026.	✓ Yes 72.6%; No 27.4%
20	Laurie B. San Angelo	2020	Incumbent retained in retention vote held November 3, 2026.	✓ Yes 66.4%; No 33.6%
21	Cynthia Kuhn	2016	Incumbent retained in retention vote held November 3, 2026.	✓ Yes 66.7%; No 33.3%
22	Jeffrey T. Bergin	2011	Incumbent retained in retention vote held November 3, 2026.	✓ Yes 66.0%; No 34.0%
25	Randi L. Burnett	2023	Incumbent retained in retention vote held November 3, 2026.	✓ Yes 69.0%; No 31.0%

== Pinal County Superior Court ==
Five members of the Pinal County Superior Court are up for retention.

Position	Incumbent	First appointed	Status	Vote
At-large	Jessica K. Dixon	2023	Incumbent retained in retention vote held November 3, 2026.	✓ Yes 71.5%; No 28.5%
At-large	Danielle Harris	2023	Incumbent retained in retention vote held November 3, 2026.	✓ Yes 72.4%; No 27.6%
At-large	Delia R. Neal	2016	Incumbent retained in retention vote held November 3, 2026.	✓ Yes 74.5%; No 25.5%
At-large	Karen F. Palmer	2023	Incumbent retained in retention vote held November 3, 2026.	✓ Yes 72.6%; No 27.4%
At-large	Daniel A. Washburn	2010	Incumbent retained in retention vote held November 3, 2026.	✓ Yes 73.7%; No 26.3%

== See also ==
- 2026 Arizona elections
- 2026 United States judicial elections
