= Clark v. Arizona =

- Supreme Court of the United States

Argued April 19, 2006 Decided June 29, 2006
- Full case name: Eric Michael Clark v. State of Arizona
- Docket no.: 05-5966
- Citations: 548 U.S. 735 (more) 126 S. Ct. 2709; 165 L. Ed. 2d 842

Case history
- Prior: Defendant convicted, Coconino County Superior Court, Sept. 3, 2003; affirmed, Ariz. Ct. App., Jan. 25, 2005; review denied, Ariz., May 25, 2005; cert. granted, 126 S. Ct. 797 (2005).

Holding
- Due process does not prohibit Arizona's use of an insanity test stated solely in terms of the capacity to tell whether an act charged as a crime was right or wrong. The state could also constitutionally limit a defendant's evidence of mental defect to only what is relevant to that insanity test, even when mens rea is an element of the charged crime. Arizona Court of Appeals affirmed.

Court membership
- Chief Justice John Roberts Associate Justices John P. Stevens · Antonin Scalia; Anthony Kennedy · David Souter; Clarence Thomas · Ruth Bader Ginsburg; Stephen Breyer · Samuel Alito

Case opinions
- Majority: Souter, joined by Roberts, Scalia, Thomas, Alito; Breyer (except Parts III–B and III–C and ultimate disposition)
- Concur/dissent: Breyer
- Dissent: Kennedy, joined by Stevens, Ginsburg

Laws applied
- U.S. Const. amend. XIV; Ariz. Rev. Stat. § 13-502(A)

Clark v. Arizona, 548 U.S. 735 (2006), is a United States Supreme Court case in which the Court upheld the constitutionality of the insanity defense used by Arizona.

The Court affirmed the murder conviction of a man with paranoid schizophrenia for killing a police officer.

The man had argued that his inability to understand the nature of his acts at the time that they were committed should be a sufficient basis for showing that he lacked the requisite mental state required as an element of the charged crime.

The Court upheld Arizona's restriction of admissible mental health evidence only to the issue of insanity and not to show that the defendant did not possess the required mental intent level necessary to satisfy an element of the crime. Evidence is admissible only to show that the defendant was insane at the time of the crime's commission.

In this case, the defendant knew right from wrong and so he could not qualify under Arizona's insanity defense.

== Background ==
The constitutionality of an insanity defense was questioned as well as whether a defendant has a Fourteenth Amendment due process right, unrelated to the insanity plea, to present the correct evidence on the mental state to counter the prosecution's evidence of criminal intent.

In the case, Eric Clark shot and killed a police officer at a traffic stop because he believed his town in Arizona had been taken over by aliens. Clark was diagnosed with paranoid schizophrenia and used the insanity defense to try to use his mental disorder as an excuse for the crime that he had committed.

The court did not believe that Clark's insanity defense was a justifiable defense, and he was sentenced to 25 years in prison. Throughout the court case, Clark presented an elaborate testimony describing his odd behavior a year prior to the incident. Among many other things, Clark believed that "aliens", some being government employees, were trying to hurt and kill him and that the only way to stop them was through death.

A psychiatrist testified that Clark has paranoid schizophrenia in which a patient has delusions that a person is against the patient and/or family. The psychiatrist said that at the time of the shooting, Clark was incapable of deciding right from wrong and so was insane.

Before being tried again, he was committed to a mental institution for two years, and his belief in aliens was still present afterward, but he believed that they were no longer out to get him but had another mission.

== Oral argument ==
Arizona was represented by assistant attorney general Randall M. Howe. Clark was represented by Colorado attorney David I Goldberg.

== Decision ==
In a 5–4 decision, in favor of Arizona, the US Supreme Court decided that the Arizona court could limit the amount of evidence used to plea a person's sanity for a defendant's insanity defense. Justice Souter believed that having a defendant prove his insanity in order to justify they were unable to clearly think while committing the crime would disprove his claim for insanity because they were able to think clearly to prove they were insane. The court cited the Arizona Supreme Court's decision in State v. Mott, which refused to allow a psychiatric testimony to invalidate a criminal's intent and to uphold that Arizona does not allow evidence of a mental illness to neutralize the mens rea of a crime. Mens Rea is an element of criminal responsibility regarding whether or not there was intention or knowledge of wrongdoing while a crime was being committed. The court also determined that due process does not require a State to use both areas of the M'Naughten insanity test. Rather, a State may adopt an insanity test that focuses solely on moral incapacity.

== Dissenting opinions ==
Judges Ginsburg, Kennedy, and Stevens disagreed with the majority ruling of the court. Justice Breyer partially concurred and agreed with the Court's "basic categorization" of evidence related to insanity. Further, he acknowledged that a State may provide consideration of mental-disease "solely in conjunction with the insanity defense." However, he dissented from the majority's opinion and would change the case so that Arizona courts could determine whether state law is consistent.

In dissent, Justice Kennedy stated that it was not necessary for him to address Clark's due process challenge to Arizona's insanity test. Instead, he disagreed with the majority for limiting Clark's claim to evidentiary support on his insanity. He also believed the Mott Rule, which does not allow evidence for insanity to prove someone is not guilty, to be unjust in the case as it is an exclusion of evidence, despite its credibility.

== Controversy ==
There was no controversy that Clark had schizophrenia when he shot Officer Moritz. There was no controversy either that Clark actually believed that there were aliens who were out to get him, as he hung fishing line in his room as "booby traps" as well as wind chimes on the doors and windows to warn him of intruders. Lastly, Clark kept a bird in his car to warn him of different changes in air temperature, which he believed could lead to possible intruders.

There is some controversy on the reasons for Clark's actions on the night of the crime. For example, he was playing music in his car at high volume. The state believed that the music was meant to lure the officer to his vehicle with a nuisance offense, as Clark had mentioned to a friend that he wanted to shoot a cop. The defense expert, Dr. Morentz, dismissed that theory and believed Clark was playing music loudly to "drown out" the voices in his head, a tactic common among people with paranoid schizophrenia.

The state and the defense began again to agree after he was sent to jail. Clark called the prison guards aliens and refused to eat out of fear of being poisoned by aliens.

== Application of insanity laws ==
Depending on the state, the insanity law places the burden of proof on the prosecution, which must prove that the defendant is not insane, or on the defense, which must prove that the defendant is insane. After the application of the insanity defense began, Jones v. United States permitted people acquitted due to insanity to be held in a mental hospital for a longer time to the one that they would be in prison, depending on the circumstances. The courts also require for the subject in question to be able to withstand a trial or otherwise to be hospitalized until they are able to go to trial. Another way that a case regarding mental illness is handled is the verdict being "guilty but mentally ill." Then, the person is given a sentence but is offered psychiatric treatment while incarcerated or is taken to a mental hospital until the person is believed to be capable enough to be taken to a prison to serve the remainder of the sentence.

=== History ===
The insanity defense has existed since the 12th century and is one of the most controversial but one of the least used criminal defense strategies. It claims that a criminal defendant should not be found guilty because of the defendant's insanity. A person who is insane is said to lack the understanding of the crime or the difference between right and wrong. Initially, the defense could be used only to pardon a criminal's sentence. The concept that one's insanity could avoid the sentence began in the 19th century in Isaac Ray's The Medical Jurisprudence of Insanity and the English M'Naughton Case.

In 1843, Daniel M'Naughton was diagnosed with paranoid schizophrenia and thought that he was being persecuted, causing him to shoot and kill Edward Drummond. He was found not guilty on the grounds that he was insane at the time of his act. The public were outraged by the decision.

The rule states that every person is assumed to be sane and that to establish a ground of insanity, it must be proved that at the time of committing a crime, the criminal was acting due to a "defect of reason" or mental illness, causing a lack of understanding the nature of the act. The rule includes as a test of distinguishing whether or not a defendant can determine the difference between right and wrong.

One of the best known applications of the insanity defense was for John W. Hinckley, a man who attempted to assassinate Ronald Reagan in 1982. He was ultimately acquitted of his charges under the insanity defense. The outrage after the court decision caused four states to eliminate the insanity defense: Montana, Utah, Idaho, and Kansas.
