= 2024 Arizona elections =

- November 5, 2024

The 2024 Arizona elections were held in the state of Arizona on November 5, 2024, coinciding with the nationwide general election. One of the state's U.S. Senate seats was up for election, as were all nine of its seats in the U.S. House and three of the five seats on the Arizona Corporation Commission.

== President of the United States ==
Republican nominee and 47th President Donald Trump won Arizona by defeating incumbent Democratic Vice President Kamala Harris. He won by a margin of 5.5% and flipped the state after having lost in 2020 by 0.3% (~11,000 votes).

== U.S. Senate ==
The 2024 United States Senate election in Arizona was held on November 5, 2024, to elect a member of the United States Senate to represent the state of Arizona. Democratic congressman Ruben Gallego and Republican former news anchor Kari Lake were seeking their first term in office. Gallego succeeded independent incumbent Kyrsten Sinema, who did not seek re-election after one term.

== U.S. House of Representatives ==
2024 United States House of Representatives elections in Arizona
- November 5, 2024

All 9 Arizona seats to the United States House of Representatives
	Majority party	Minority party
Party	Republican	Democratic
Last election	6	3
Seats won	6	3
Seat change	Steady	Steady
Popular vote	1,680,841	1,551,085
Percentage	51.66%	47.67%
Swing	▼4.48%	▲5.11%

Republican
40–50%
50–60%
60–70%
70–80%
Democratic
50–60%
60–70%
70–80%

The 2024 United States House of Representatives elections in Arizona were held on November 5, 2024, to elect the nine U.S. representatives from the State of Arizona, one from each of the state's nine congressional districts. The elections coincided with the 2024 U.S. presidential election, other elections to the House of Representatives, elections to the United States Senate, and various state and local elections. The primary elections took place on July 30, 2024.

== Corporation Commission ==
The 2024 Arizona Corporation Commission election was held on November 5, 2024. It elected three members of the Arizona Corporation Commission, a five-member body tasked with regulating public utilities in the state.

Members are elected to four-year terms, with three seats up for election in presidential years and the other two up for election in midterm years. The elections use plurality block voting, and each party will nominate 3 candidates. Republicans currently hold 4 seats on the board, while Democrats hold 1.

Two Republicans, Lea Márquez Peterson and James O'Connor, were up for re-election in 2024, as is the lone Democrat, Anna Tovar.

== State legislature ==
All 90 seats in both chambers of the Arizona State Legislature were up for election in 2024. Republicans registered gains in both chambers.

=== State Senate ===
Party	Before	After	Change
Republican	16	17	▲1
Democratic	14	13	▼1
Total	30	30	Steady

=== House of Representatives ===
Party	Before	After	Change
Republican	31	33	▲2
Democratic	29	27	▼2
Total	60	60	Steady

== State Supreme Court ==
Two justices on the Arizona Supreme Court were up for retention in 2024. Progress Arizona, a progressive political group, campaigned to have both of them removed over their votes in the abortion case Planned Parenthood Arizona v. Mayes.

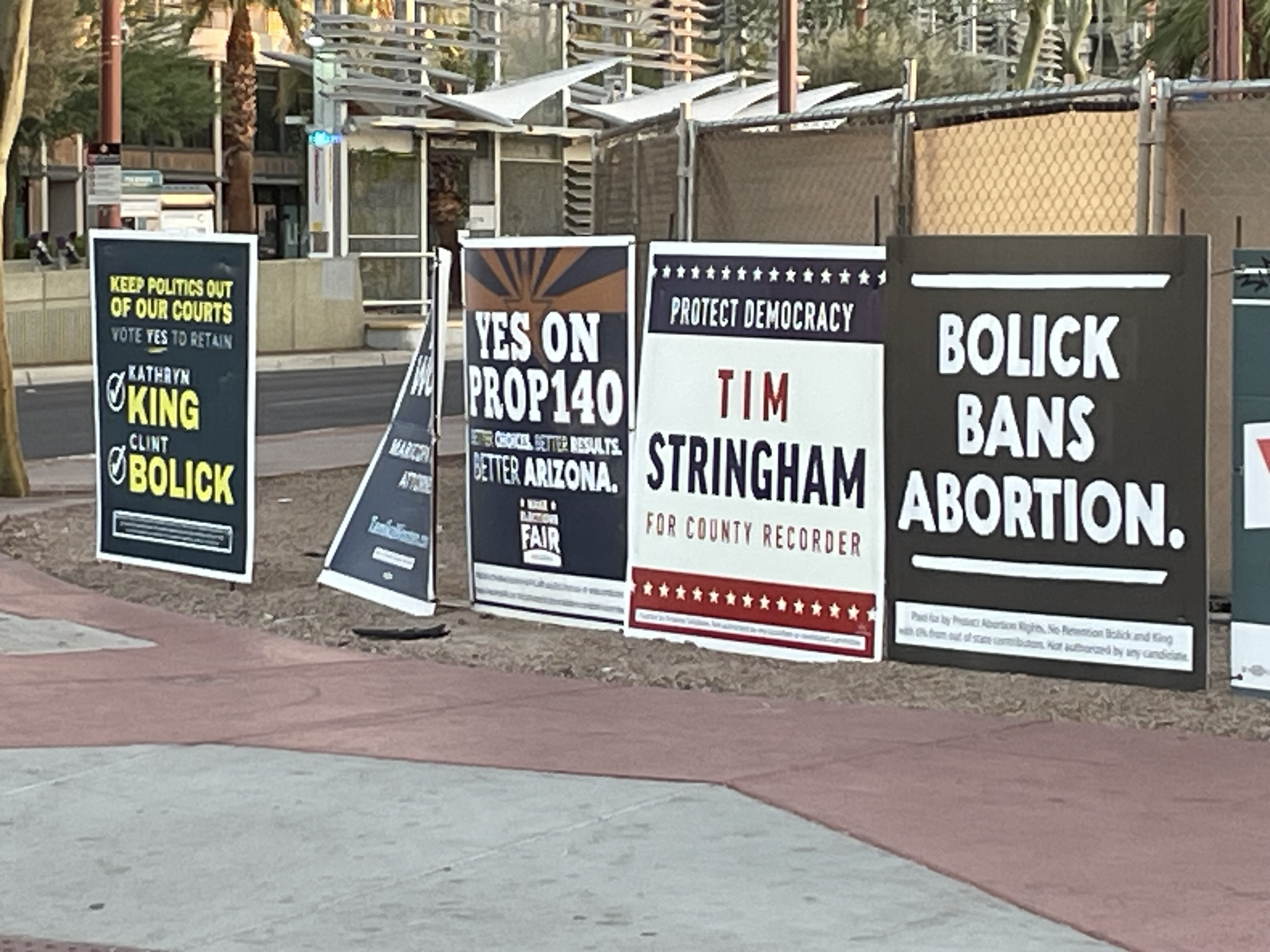
Campaign signs supporting and opposing Justice Bolick

=== Justice Bolick retention ===
Clint Bolick was appointed by Governor Doug Ducey in 2016 to succeed retiring justice Rebecca White Berch. He was retained by the voters in 2018.

Results by county Yes: 50–60%; 60–70%; 70–80%; No: 50–60%

Justice Bolick retention, 2024
Choice	Votes	%
For	1,534,635	58.19
Against	1,102,423	41.81
Total	2,637,058	100.00
Source: Arizona Secretary of State

=== Justice King retention ===
Results by county Yes: 50–60%; 60–70%; 70–80%; No: 50–60%

Kathryn Hackett King was appointed by Governor Doug Ducey in 2021 to succeed retiring justice Andrew Gould.

Justice King retention, 2024
Choice	Votes	%
For	1,561,227	59.35
Against	1,069,335	40.65
Total	2,630,562	100.00
Source: Arizona Secretary of State

== Ballot propositions ==
Arizona had thirteen statewide propositions on the ballot in 2024.

2024 Arizona ballot propositions
No.	Description	Type	Votes			
No.	Description	Type	Yes	%	No	%
133	Would require partisan primaries to be held for all partisan offices.	Legislatively referred constitutional amendment	1,286,640	42.18	1,763,711	57.82
134	Would require a certain number of signatures from each legislative district for citizen-initiated ballot measures.	Legislatively referred constitutional amendment	1,279,574	41.98	1,768,613	58.02
135	Would allow the legislature to change emergency powers granted to the Governor.	Legislatively referred constitutional amendment	1,328,402	43.56	1,720,849	56.44
136	Would allow legal challenges to ballot initiatives before one has been passed.	Legislatively referred constitutional amendment	1,151,823	38.10	1,871,364	61.90
137	Would replace county and statewide judge term limits with retention elections and judicial review.	Legislatively referred constitutional amendment	679,824	22.33	2,364,888	77.67
138	Would allow for tipped workers to be paid less than minimum wage.	Legislatively referred constitutional amendment	792,557	25.24	2,348,023	74.76
139	Would constitutionally protect the right to abortion until fetal viability.	Citizen-initiated constitutional amendment	2,000,287	61.61	1,246,202	38.39
140	Would require nonpartisan primaries and majority vote in general elections.	Citizen-initiated constitutional amendment	1,284,176	41.32	1,823,445	58.68
311	Would establish a $20 fee on every criminal conviction to go toward fire responder's families, provided they are killed in the line of duty.	Legislatively referred state statute	2,016,450	64.17	1,126,070	35.83
312	Would allow property owners to request property tax refunds if their city does not enforce certain laws.	Legislatively referred state statute	1,804,728	58.62	1,274,031	41.38
313	Would require that convicted sex traffickers serve life in prison.	Legislatively referred state statute	2,025,608	64.54	1,112,951	35.46
314	Would increase police and judge's ability to enforce border laws.	Legislatively referred state statute	1,949,529	62.59	1,165,237	37.41
315	Would prohibit rules from becoming effective if regulatory costs increase by more than $500,000 within five years.	Legislatively referred state statute	1,383,303	46.69	1,579,549	53.31
Source: Arizona Secretary of State

Results by county

Proposition 133 results by county
Yes:
- 50–60%
No:
- 60–70%
- 50–60%

Proposition 134 results by county
Yes:
- 50–60%
No:
- 60–70%
- 50–60%

Proposition 135 results by county
Yes:
- 50–60%
No:
- 60–70%
- 50–60%

Proposition 136 results by county
No:
- 70–80%
- 60–70%
- 50–60%

Proposition 137 results by county
No:
- 80–90%
- 70–80%
- 60–70%

Proposition 138 results by county
No:
- 80–90%
- 70–80%
- 60–70%

Proposition 139 results by county
Yes:
- 60–70%
- 50–60%
No:
- 50–60%

Proposition 140 results by county
Yes:
- 50–60%
No:
- 60–70%
- 50–60%

Proposition 311 results by county
Yes:
- 70–80%
- 60–70%
- 50–60%

Proposition 312 results by county
Yes:
- 60–70%
- 50–60%

Proposition 313 results by county
Yes:
- 70–80%
- 60–70%
- 50–60%

Proposition 314 results by county
Yes:
- 70–80%
- 60–70%
- 50–60%

Proposition 315 results by county
Yes:
- 50–60%
No:
- 60–70%
- 50–60%

== Local elections ==
Numerous local elections will also took place in 2024. Some notable ones included:

- Elections for all five seats on the Maricopa County Board of Supervisors.
- Election for mayor of Phoenix.
- Election for mayor of Mesa.
