= Andrew Gould (judge) =

American judge (born 1963)

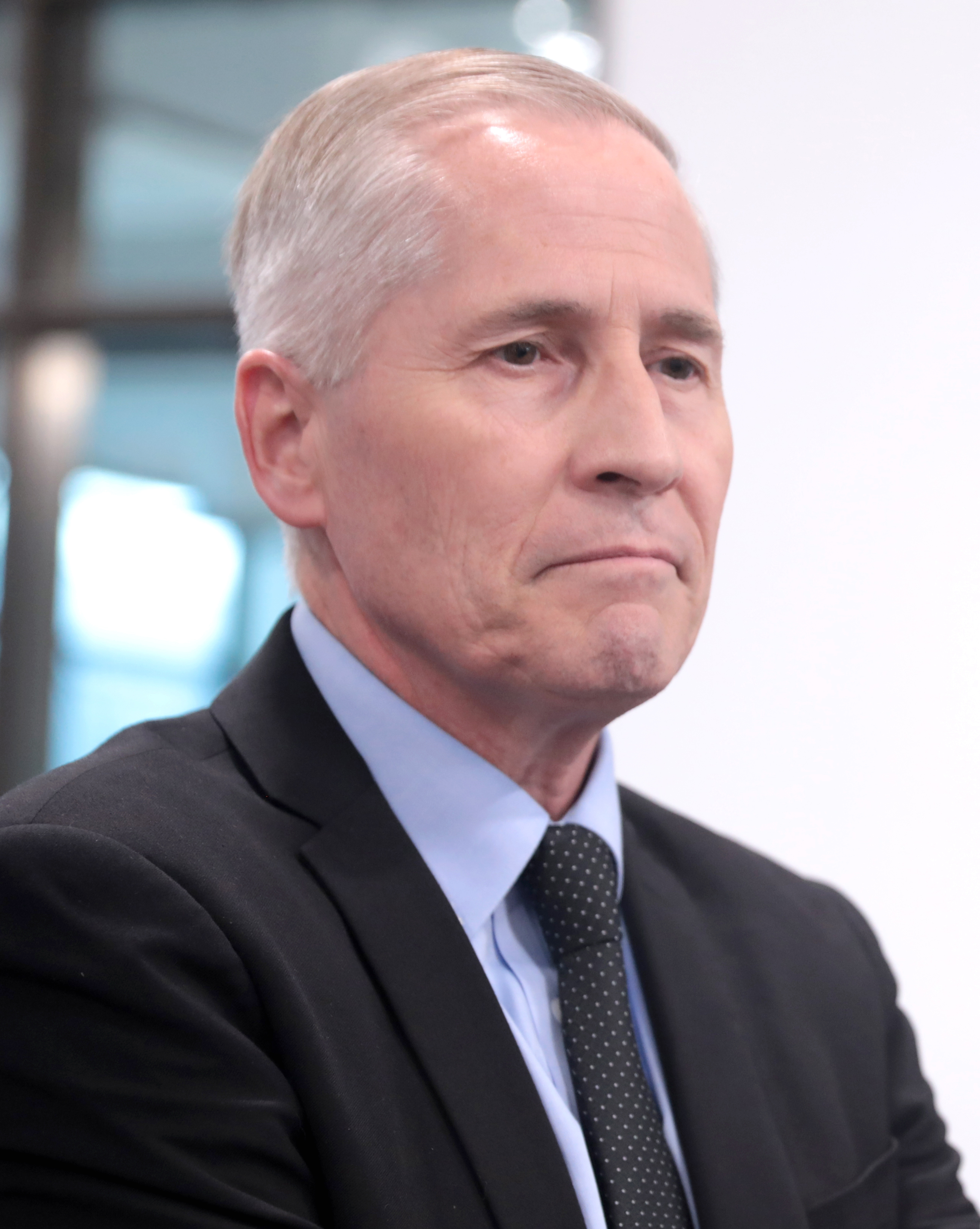

Justice of the Arizona Supreme Court
- In office December 19, 2016 – April 1, 2021
- Appointed by: Doug Ducey
- Preceded by: Seat established
- Succeeded by: Kathryn Hackett King

Judge of the Arizona Court of Appeals
- In office January 2012 – December 19, 2016
- Appointed by: Jan Brewer
- Preceded by: Sheldon Weisberg
- Succeeded by: Maria Elena Cruz

Personal details
- Born: October 18, 1963 (age 62)
- Party: Republican
- Education: University of Montana (BA); Northwestern University (JD)

Andrew W. Gould (born October 18, 1963) is a former justice of the Arizona Supreme Court. He assumed office in 2016 and began his second term on January 4, 2021, having been retained to the Arizona Supreme Court on November 3, 2020, with 68.1% of the vote. On March 12, 2021, Gould announced his retirement from the court, effective April 1, 2021.

== Early life and education ==
Gould attended the University of Montana, where he received a bachelor's degree in political science in 1986. He attended law school at the Northwestern University School of Law, attaining his Juris Doctor degree in 1990.

== Professional career ==
After graduating from law school, Gould joined the law firm Snell & Wilmer. After working for four years in private practice, Gould became a prosecutor in Yuma and Maricopa counties. In 1998, Gould worked briefly as a prosecutor in Indiana. Starting in 2001, after being appointed by Governor Jane Dee Hull, Gould would spend a decade as a judge of the Yuma County Superior Court, before being appointed to the Arizona Court of Appeals in October 2011 by Governor Jan Brewer.

After the Arizona Supreme Court was expanded to seven justices, Governor Doug Ducey appointed Gould to one of the vacant seats. Gould was sworn in on December 19, 2016.

In September 2019, Gould authored a 4–3 decision preventing a small business from being forced to create custom invitations for same-sex weddings.

In 2021, Gould announced his retirement effective April 1. Shortly after his official retirement, Gould announced his run as the Republican candidate for Arizona's Attorney General. Gould lost the Republican primary to Abe Hamadeh.

In 2023, Gould joined the Arizona office of the law firm Holtzman Vogel.

Legal offices
New seat	Justice of the Arizona Supreme Court; 2016–2021	Succeeded by Kathryn Hackett King
