= Arizona Proposition 314 =

- November 5, 2024
- Immigration and Border Law Enforcement Measure

Results
Choice	Votes	%
Yes	1,949,529	62.59%
No	1,165,237	37.41%
County results
Yes
70–80%
60–70%
50–60%

Arizona Proposition 314, officially the Immigration and Border Law Enforcement Measure and commonly called the Secure the Border Act, is a legislatively referred state statute that appeared on the November 5, 2024, ballot in Arizona. Voters approved it with 62.6% of the vote. The measure made it a state crime to enter Arizona from Mexico anywhere other than a port of entry, allowed state and local police to arrest people suspected of doing so, and allowed state judges to order those convicted to leave the country. It also created new state crimes for using false documents to obtain employment or public benefits, required state agencies to check the immigration status of public benefit applicants, and increased penalties for knowingly selling fentanyl that results in a death.

Republican legislators referred the measure to voters after Governor Katie Hobbs vetoed a similar bill in March 2024. The border-crossing provision was modeled on Texas's Senate Bill 4 and was written to take effect only after that law was in force. Following federal court rulings on the Texas law in 2026, the provision took effect in July 2026. The act has survived several court challenges. On September 10, 2026, the Arizona Court of Appeals unanimously rejected a state constitutional challenge to the measure.

== Background ==
Entering the United States outside a port of entry is a federal crime, and enforcement of immigration law has traditionally been a federal responsibility. Arizona has a history of state-level immigration measures, including SB 1070 in 2010, which was partly struck down by the U.S. Supreme Court in Arizona v. United States (2012). Opponents of Proposition 314 compared it to that law.

In 2023, Texas enacted Senate Bill 4 (SB 4), which made entering Texas from another country outside an official crossing a state crime and required state judges to order the removal of people convicted of it. A federal district court blocked SB 4 in February 2024, and the litigation continued for more than two years.

In March 2024, Governor Hobbs, a Democrat, vetoed a Republican-backed bill called the Arizona Border Invasion Act that would have made illegal border crossing a state crime. Because the Arizona Legislature can refer measures directly to voters without the governor's signature, Republican leaders turned to the ballot.

=== Legislative history ===
The measure began as House Concurrent Resolution 2060 (HCR 2060). The original version was a referral on employment law that would have made it harder for people in the country illegally to work in Arizona. The House passed it 31 to 28 on February 22, 2024.

In May 2024, Senate Republicans replaced the text with the Secure the Border Act. The Arizona Senate approved the amended resolution 16 to 13 on May 22, along party lines. The House gave final approval on June 4, 2024, by a vote of 31 to 29. Senate President Warren Petersen and other Republican leaders described the measure as a response to what they called a border crisis and to the governor's vetoes of earlier bills. Hobbs said the measure would hurt Arizona businesses and strain the state budget.

=== Ballot placement ===
Four Latino advocacy groups sued to remove the measure from the ballot, arguing it violated the Arizona Constitution's single-subject requirement because it changed unrelated parts of state law. A trial court rejected the argument in July 2024, and on August 13, 2024, the Arizona Supreme Court unanimously upheld that ruling in a brief order, citing a strong presumption that measures the legislature refers to voters are constitutional.

== Provisions ==
Proposition 314 covers several areas of state law. As reported by news outlets and in court filings, its main provisions are:

Unauthorized entry (Section 5)
Makes it a state crime to enter Arizona from Mexico at any place other than a port of entry. The offense is a class 1 misdemeanor punishable by up to six months in jail. State and local law enforcement officers may arrest people they suspect of crossing, and Arizona judges may order people convicted of the offense to leave the country. The act lists three ways probable cause can be established: an officer sees the crossing, there is a recording of it, or there is other constitutionally sufficient evidence.
The act directs state or local law enforcement to transport people who agree to leave to a port of entry or into federal custody, and directs the Arizona Department of Corrections, Rehabilitation and Reentry to house people convicted under the section if a county or local agency lacks the capacity to do so.
This section was written to take effect 60 days after Texas SB 4, or a similar law in another state, was implemented.

Document fraud
Creates a class 6 felony for submitting false documentation to establish eligibility for employment or to apply for public benefits.

Public benefits and employment verification
Requires state agencies to check applicants' immigration status through the federal Systematic Alien Verification for Entitlements (SAVE) database before approving public benefits. It also adds employment status verification requirements.

Fentanyl
Creates a class 2 felony for knowingly selling fentanyl that results in a person's death.

== Campaign ==
=== Support ===
Support came mainly from Republican officials. Senate President Warren Petersen and House Speaker Ben Toma backed the measure, and Toma called it a comprehensive approach to illegal immigration that he said was a leading concern for voters of all parties. Supporters argued that the state needed its own tools because of what they described as federal inaction at the border, and Petersen pointed to the cost of the border situation to taxpayers. They also said that, unlike SB 1070, the border-crossing provision applied only in the border region.

=== Opposition ===
Governor Hobbs, the ACLU of Arizona, and several business groups opposed the measure. The ACLU of Arizona said it would lead to racial profiling and the harassment and arrest of long-time Arizona residents. The Tucson Metro Chamber urged a no vote, citing possible effects on local resources and the business climate. Monica Villalobos, president of the Arizona Hispanic Chamber of Commerce, spoke against it at an October 10, 2024, event in Phoenix. David Rhodes, president of the Arizona Sheriffs Association, also criticized it, saying it was not the best solution to the problem.

=== Polling ===
An August 2024 poll by Noble Predictive Insights found 63% of registered voters supporting the measure, with a margin of error of 3.09 percentage points. Support was 77% among Republicans, 57% among independents and 52% among Democrats. Within the measure, the strongest-supported components were holding drug dealers responsible for fentanyl deaths (77%) and requiring employers to verify workers' immigration status (75%).

== Results ==
The Associated Press called the race the morning after the election. The state certified the results on November 25, 2024.

Proposition 314
Choice	Votes	%
Yes	1,949,529	62.59
No	1,165,237	37.41
Total votes	3,114,766	100.00

Results as reported in the Arizona Secretary of State's signed canvass. Some outlets reported the vote as 61%, but the canvass figure is 62.59%.

== Implementation and legal challenges ==
=== Texas SB 4 and the trigger ===
Section 5 could not take effect until Texas's SB 4 took effect. On April 24, 2026, the full Fifth Circuit vacated the injunction against SB 4 by a 10-7 vote, ruling that the plaintiffs lacked standing and not reaching the law's constitutionality. A new class action was filed on May 4, 2026, and a federal district court issued a fresh injunction on May 14. On May 29, a Fifth Circuit panel stayed that injunction, allowing Texas to enforce SB 4 while litigation continued. Arizona's Section 5 then took effect in July 2026. Arizona Attorney General Kris Mayes said only people who cross on or after the effective date can be convicted under it.

=== State court challenge by LUCHA and ACE ===
In April 2025, Living United for Change in Arizona (LUCHA) and the Arizona Center for Empowerment (ACE) sued in Maricopa County Superior Court to have the entire act declared unconstitutional. They argued that it violated the Arizona Constitution's requirement that ballot measures identify a funding source, that its probable-cause language intruded on the judiciary's role, and that tying its effective date to the Texas litigation improperly delegated legislative power. Attorney General Mayes, a Democrat who had opposed the measure, joined Republican legislative leaders in defending the law in court. Her office said that did not mean she endorsed its policies, only that it was not inherently unconstitutional.

On October 13, 2025, Judge Michael Valenzuela dismissed the suit. He ruled that the plaintiffs could challenge the trigger provision but that the legislature may make a law's applicability contingent on another event, and he found the challenges to the then-dormant border provisions were not ripe for review. The plaintiffs appealed.

On September 10, 2026, a three-judge panel of the Arizona Court of Appeals, Division One, affirmed in a unanimous opinion written by Vice Chief Judge David Weinzweig. The court rejected the revenue-source argument, reasoning that the act's custody and transport provisions assign duties to local agencies first and make state agencies a fallback, so the act does not itself require the state to spend money. On the SAVE database, the court noted that the federal government had waived fees for state, local and tribal agencies in April 2026 and that any future fees would result from federal policy, not the act. It also held that the probable-cause provision restates the existing requirement and does not take over a judicial function, and said the plaintiffs had not described facts showing how it might be misapplied. LUCHA's executive director, Alejandra Gomez, criticized the ruling and said the group was considering asking the Arizona Supreme Court to review it.

=== Federal court challenge ===
In July 2026, days before Section 5 took effect, the ACLU and the ACLU of Arizona sued in federal court on behalf of the Florence Immigrant and Refugee Rights Project. The suit argued that Section 5 was unconstitutional, intruded on federal authority over immigration, and could lead to racial profiling and discriminatory arrests. U.S. District Judge Michael Liburdi denied a request for a temporary restraining order. Mayes and Republican legislative leaders, who were defending the law, argued the suit was premature because no one had been arrested under the law and the organization had not shown it was harmed.

In August 2026, the ACLU of Arizona voluntarily dismissed the case. It did not state a reason. In its announcement, the organization said it knew of no law enforcement agency or prosecutor in Arizona enforcing Section 5, maintained that the law remained unconstitutional, and said a new suit could be filed later.
