= Kathryn Hackett King =

American judge (born 1980)

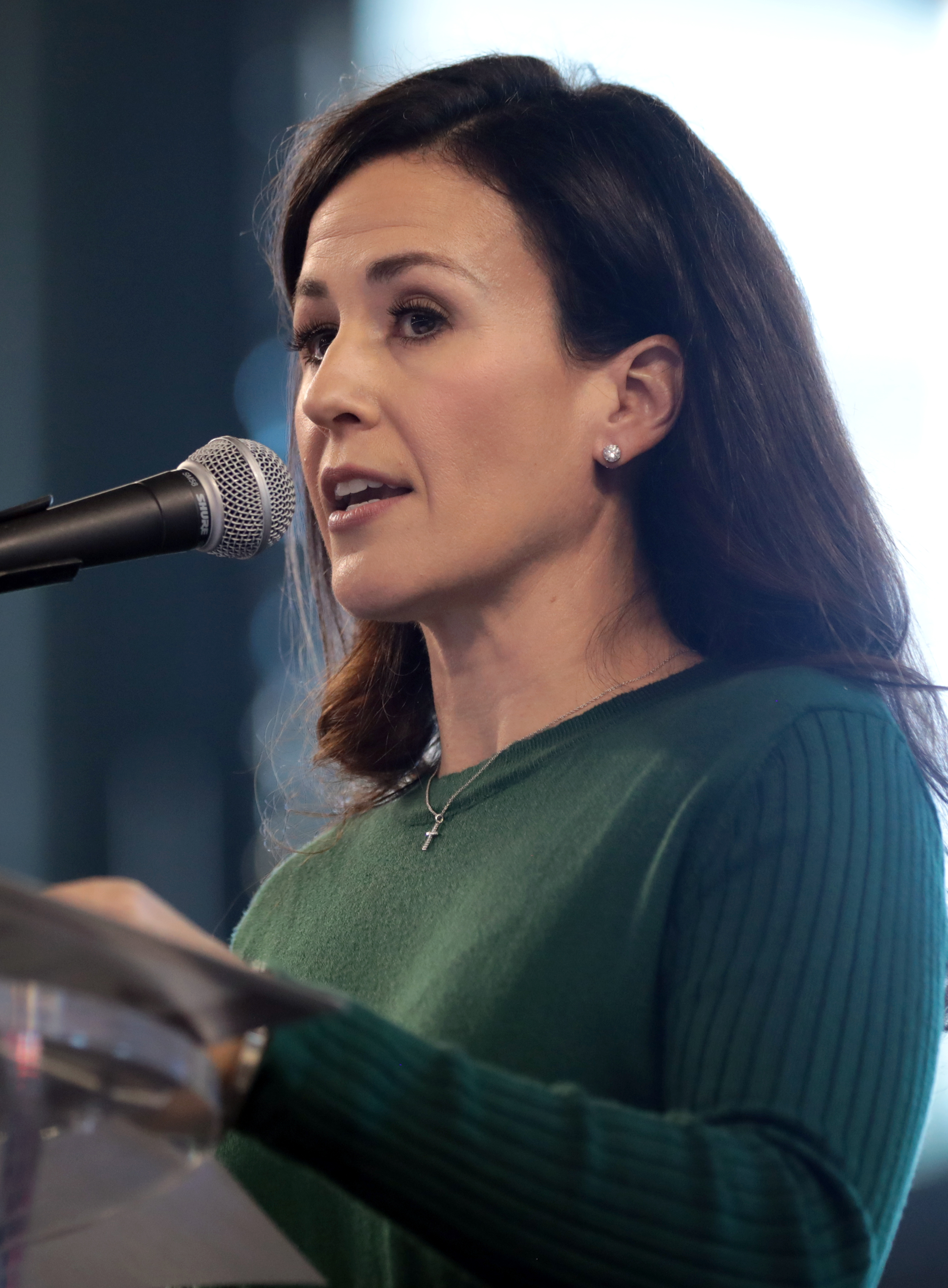

Justice of the Arizona Supreme Court
- Incumbent
- Assumed office July 8, 2021
- Appointed by: Doug Ducey
- Preceded by: Andrew Gould

Personal details
- Born: 1980 (age 45–46)
- Party: Republican
- Education: Duke University (BA); University of Arizona (JD)

Kathryn Hackett King (born 1980) is an American lawyer who has served a justice of the Arizona Supreme Court, sworn in on July 8, 2021. King served on the Arizona Board of Regents from 2020 to 2021.

== Early life and education ==
King is a graduate of the Duke University, where she received a bachelor's degree in political science, and she received a Juris Doctor from University of Arizona School of Law in 2006. While attending the University of Arizona, King participated in the law college's secondary scholarly journal, the Arizona Journal of International and Comparative Law.

== Career ==
After law school, King clerked for Arizona Supreme Court Justice Michael D. Ryan and then became an associate at Snell & Wilmer. In 2015, King became deputy general counsel to Governor Doug Ducey. In 2017, King became a partner at the woman-owned law firm Burns Barton, where she practiced employment law.

In March 2020, Ducey appointed King to the Arizona Board of Regents. She resigned in 2021.

In July 2021, Ducey appointed King to a seat on the Arizona Supreme Court, replacing Andrew Gould. King was retained by voters in 2024, receiving 59.3% yes votes.

King's professional affiliations include membership to the Arizona Women Lawyers Association and the Federalist Society.

Legal offices
Preceded by Andrew Gould	Justice of the Arizona Supreme Court; 2021–present	Incumbent
