= Randall M. Howe =

Arizona Court of Appeals judge

Judge of the Arizona Court of Appeals
- Incumbent
- Assumed office May 29, 2012
- Appointed by: Jan Brewer
- Preceded by: Daniel Barker

Personal details
- Born: 1963 (age 62–63)
- Party: Republican Party
- Education: Arizona State University; Arizona State University College of Law J.D.

Randall M. Howe (born 1963) is a judge of the Arizona Court of Appeals, serving since 2012. He is the first person with cerebral palsy to argue at the United States Supreme Court.

== Early life and education ==
Howe was born with cerebral palsy. He has only one functioning arm, a speech impediment, and could not walk until age 9. Growing up in Brighton, Colorado, Howe's parents had to threaten legal actions against the local school board after officials refused to enroll him in elementary school. A school across town eventually agreed to enroll him.

After moving to Arizona, Howe graduated from Arizona State University summa cum laude in 1985, majoring in business administration with an emphasis in finance. He earned his Juris Doctor from Arizona State University College of Law, graduating cum laude in 1988. During law school, Howe was selected as a member of ASU's national moot court team.

== Legal career ==
In 1988, Howe began his legal career as an associate with the law firm of Storey & Ross. The following year he joined the Arizona Attorney General's Office where he worked in the criminal appeals section, and then in the liability management section as an appellate supervisor. In 2001, he became chief counsel of the criminal appeals section. From 2008 until his judicial appointment, Howe served in the United States Attorney's Office for the District of Arizona, first as an assistant U.S. attorney, and then as deputy chief of the appellate division.

Howe personally argued 84 appellate cases before the Arizona Supreme Court, the Arizona Court of Appeals, and the United States Court of Appeals for the Ninth Circuit. In 2006, Howe represented Arizona at the United States Supreme Court when he argued Clark v. Arizona, in which the Court upheld the constitutionality of the insanity defense used by Arizona.

In 2019, Howe was a finalist for a seat on the Arizona Supreme Court.

== Arizona Court of Appeals ==
Howe was appointed to the Arizona Court of Appeals by Republican Governor Jan Brewer in April 2012 to succeed Daniel Barker. He was retained by the voters in 2014 and 2020.

In 2015, Howe was selected to serve on an Arizona Supreme Court case involving judicial pensions filed by judge Jon W. Thompson after the justices recused themselves. Howe ultimately authored the 3-2 decision in favor of the plan members and found the proposed changes violated the pension clause of the Arizona Constitution.

In 2022, Howe authored an opinion in Ridgell v. ADCS ordering the Department of Child Safety to remove a woman from the registry of child abusers, because the medical marijuana she consumed while pregnant "must be considered the equivalent of the use of any other medication under the direction of a physician". Howe also authored an opinion in Aloia v. Gore, reinstating a $58.9 million judgment against the former owners of a medical company for selling donated bodies on the black market.
