= Scott Martinez =

American lawyer

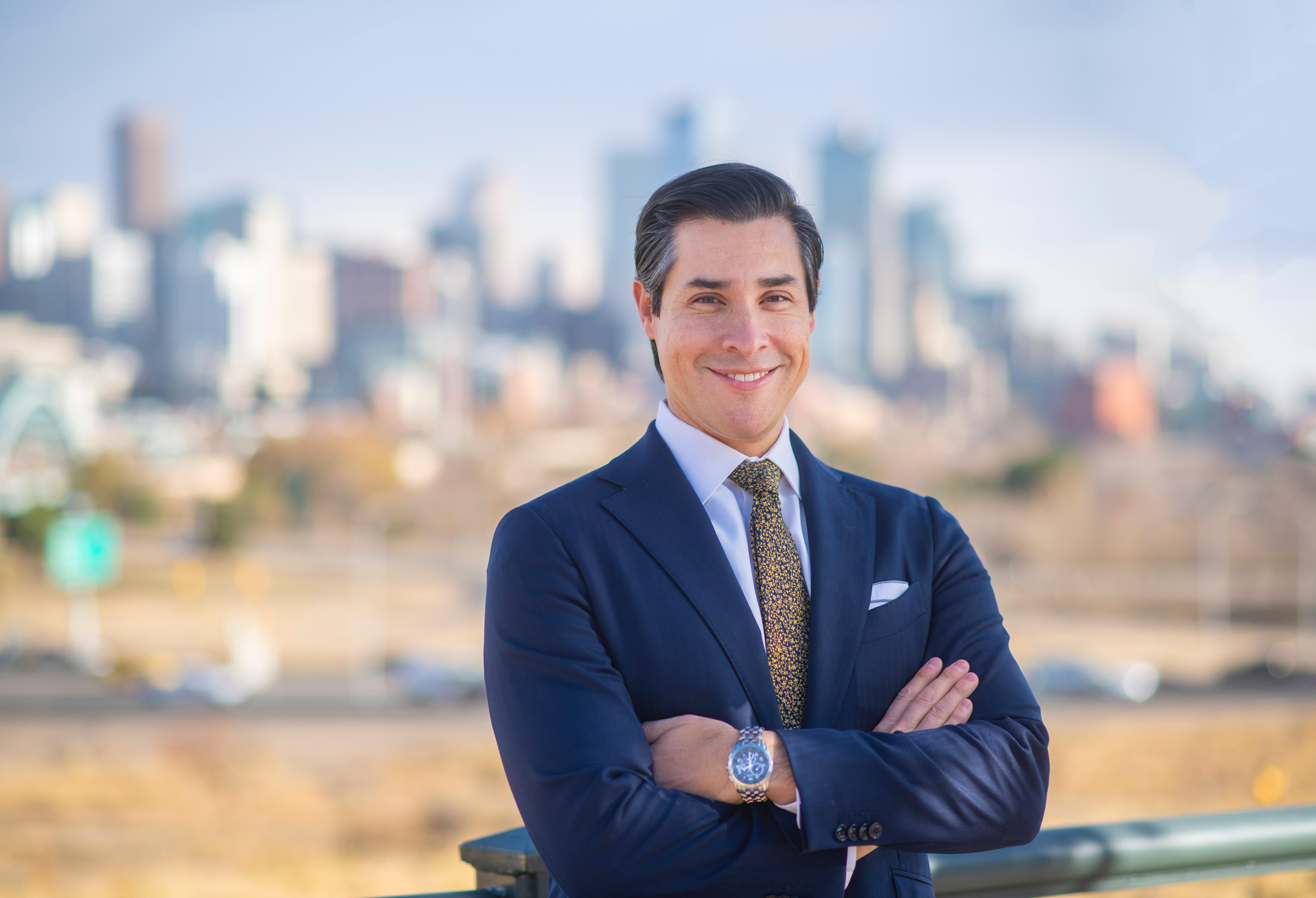
Martinez in 2022

D. Scott Martinez is a lawyer and former Denver City Attorney from 2012 to 2016. He grew up in Lakewood, a suburb of Denver, Colorado. He graduated from the University of Colorado Boulder in 2000 with a bachelor's degree in International Affairs and received his Juris Doctor from University of San Diego School of Law in 2006.

Martinez worked as a litigator at the firm Holland & Hart in Denver prior to working for the city attorney's office. He was an advisor to the Clinton-Kaine presidential election campaign and worked in the office of the White House counsel for the Obama-Biden transition. Martinez returned to Denver and led the state's Democratic Party in their redistricting and reapportionment efforts that were later upheld by the Colorado Supreme Court. In early 2012, he was appointed as Chief Deputy City Attorney by Denver Mayor Michael B. Hancock. In 2013 he was promoted to lead Denver City Attorney by Hancock, replacing Doug Friednash, who eventually became Colorado Governor John Hickenlooper’s chief of staff. At age 34, Martinez was the youngest to ever serve as lead attorney in the city's history.

In 2014, while working in the city attorney's office, Martinez was named National Latino Lawyer of the Year by the Hispanic National Bar Association. Martinez stepped down as city attorney in 2016. In February 2017, Martinez became a partner at Snell & Wilmer law office where he oversaw the Government Relations, Regulatory and Administrative Law division in the Denver office. As of 2021, he is a partner at MG Public Affairs, a government relations firm, Marvera Partners LLP, a consulting firm, and the owner of Martinez and Partners, LLC, a boutique government and business services law firm.
