= Gary K. Nelson =

American lawyer and politician (1935–2013)

- Nelson during Miranda v. Arizona oral arguments. Circa 1966

Judge of the Arizona Court of Appeals
- In office June 1974 – November 1978
- Appointed by: Jack Williams
- Preceded by: None (new seat)
- Succeeded by: Joe W. Contreras

17th Attorney General of Arizona
- In office July 1, 1968 – July 1, 1974
- Governor: Jack Williams
- Preceded by: Darrell F. Smith
- Succeeded by: N. Warner Lee

Personal details
- Born: July 12, 1935 La Crosse, Wisconsin
- Died: May 17, 2013 (aged 77) Mesa, Arizona
- Party: Republican

Gary K. Nelson (July 12, 1935 – May 17, 2013) was an American lawyer, politician, and jurist who served as the Attorney General of Arizona from 1968 to 1974. Appointed to the court of appeals, Nelson is the only appellate judge in Arizona history to not be retained by the voters.

== Life and career ==
Nelson was born in La Crosse, Wisconsin in 1935. He attended Arizona State University, receiving his B.S. in 1957. Graduating from ROTC, Nelson then served in the United States Army from 1957 to 1959 in the intelligence service with the rank of captain. He earned his law degree from the University of Arizona in 1962. After graduating law school Nelson served as a law clerk to then-Chief Justice Fred C. Struckmeyer Jr. He briefing worked in private practice before becoming an assistant attorney general. In 1966, Nelson argued, and lost, the landmark supreme court case Miranda v. Arizona.

Nelson was elected attorney general in 1968. In 1974, he resigned to accept an appointment to the Arizona Court of Appeals. He lost his retention election in 1978. His retention was clouded by "allegations that he took bribes during his service as attorney general and failed to pay income taxes on the alleged payoff money. He was cleared of the accusations after federal and state investigations."

He worked as the Chief Staff Attorney for the Arizona Supreme Court from 1979 until his retirement in 1997. In 1988, Nelson was a finalist for an appointment to the state supreme court, but governor Rose Mofford selected Robert J. Corcoran instead.

Nelson died on May 17, 2013, in Mesa, Arizona at age 77.

== Election results ==
1978 Judicial Retention Election
| Choice | Votes | % |
|---|---|---|
| For | 93,486 | 41.77 |
| Against | 130,302 | 58.23 |
| Total | 223,788 | 100.00 |
