= John Pelander =

American judge (born 1951)

Justice of the Arizona Supreme Court
- In office July 28, 2009 – March 1, 2019
- Appointed by: Jan Brewer
- Preceded by: Ruth McGregor
- Succeeded by: James Beene

Personal details
- Born: January 26, 1951 (age 75)
- Party: Republican
- Education: University of Arizona

Arthur John Pelander III (born January 26, 1951) is a former justice of the Arizona Supreme Court.

Pelander has a bachelor's degree from Wittenberg University and a J.D. from the University of Arizona College of Law. He was from 1976 to 1977 clerk for Richard H. Chambers of the 9th U.S. Circuit Court of Appeals. In 1998 he earned an LL.M. from the University of Virginia School of Law in judicial processes. From 1977 until 1995 he was involved in private practice, eventually becoming a partner in a law firm. He practiced law in Tucson and was involved in civil litigation. In May 1995 he was appointed to the Arizona Court of Appeals, Division 2 by Fife Symington. In 2004 he became the chief judge of this court. In September 2009 Pelander was appointed to the Arizona Supreme Court.

During Pelander's 2012 retention election he formed a campaign committee to fight off a "a Republican and "tea party" effort to vote him off the bench." The opposition stemmed from Pelander's ruling in a three judge panel that Proposition 121 could be on the November ballot. The case was Open Government Committee v. Bennett. Pelander was retained with 73.94% of the vote in the general election on November 6, 2012. He retired on March 1, 2019.

== Sources ==
- Arizona Courts bio of Pelander
- Announcement of Pelander's appointment
- Verde Independent Aug. 3, 2009
