= Maria Elena Cruz =

American judge (born 1972)

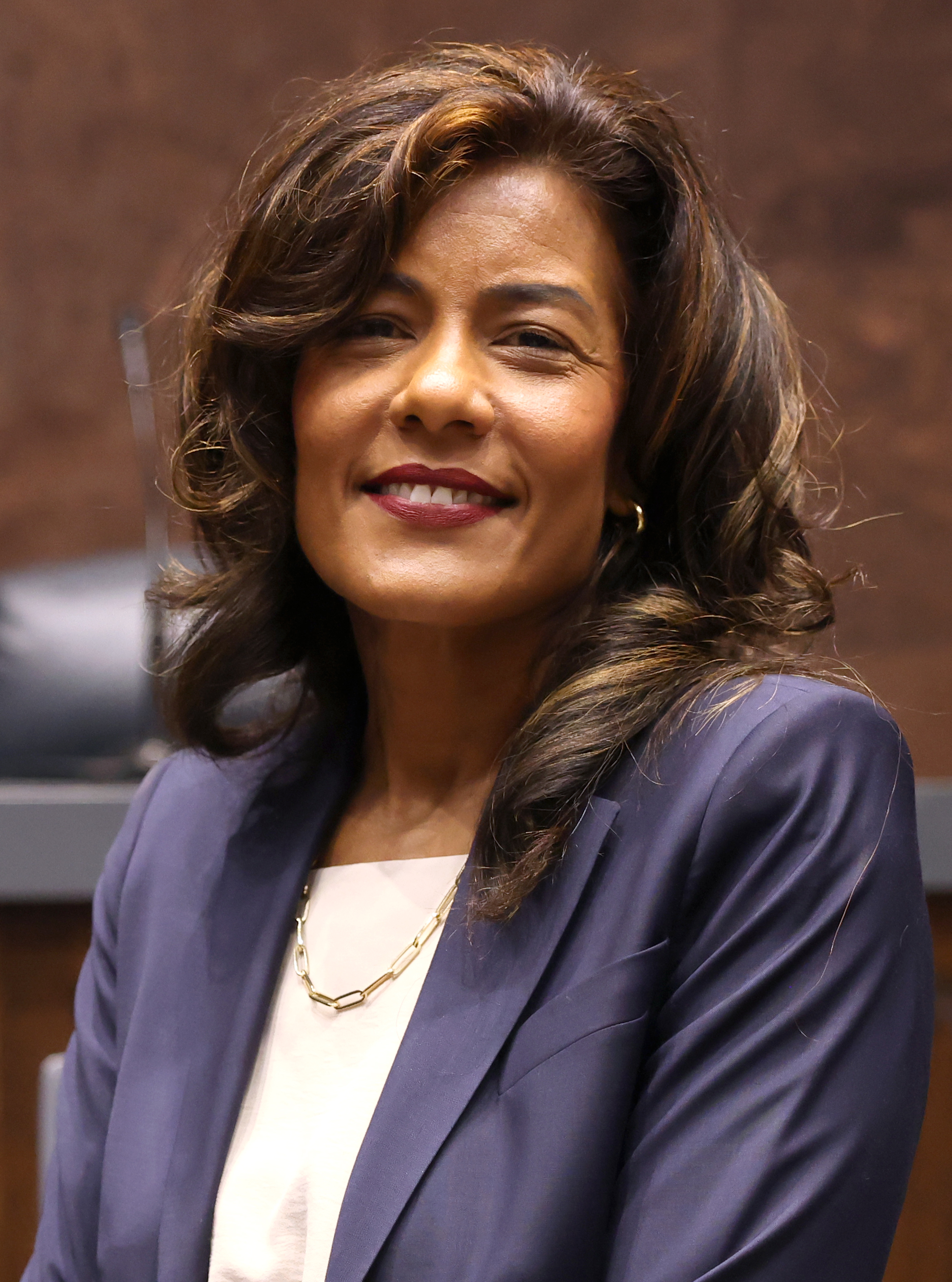
- Cruz in 2025

Justice of the Arizona Supreme Court
- Incumbent
- Assumed office February 3, 2025
- Appointed by: Katie Hobbs
- Preceded by: Robert M. Brutinel

Judge of the Arizona Court of Appeals
- In office April 12, 2017 – February 3, 2025
- Appointed by: Doug Ducey
- Preceded by: Andrew Gould
- Succeeded by: Andrew Becke

Personal details
- Born: 1972 (age 53–54) Puerto Rico
- Party: Democratic
- Education: University of Arizona (BA, JD)

Maria Elena Cruz (born 1972) is an American lawyer who has served as a justice of the Arizona Supreme Court since January 29, 2025. Cruz served on the Arizona Court of Appeals from 2017 to 2025.

== Early life and education ==
Cruz was born in New York, lived in Puerto Rico, and moved to Arizona with her parents when she was 14. Cruz is a graduate of the University of Arizona, where she received a bachelor's degree in Psychology in 1998, and a Juris Doctor from the James E. Rogers College of Law in 2001. She also received an associates degree from Arizona Western College in 1995. While attending the University of Arizona as an undergrad, Cruz was a member of the Phi Alpha Delta pre-law fraternity.

== Career ==
After law school, Cruz worked as a prosecutor, and later as a defense attorney in Tucson and Yuma.

In 2008, Cruz was elected as a judge to the Yuma County Superior Court.

In March 2017, Republican Governor Doug Ducey appointed Cruz to the Arizona Court of Appeals. This was the first judicial appointment from the opposing political party to the Arizona Court of Appeals by a governor since 1991.

In 2019, Cruz was a finalist for a vacancy on the state supreme court.

In January 2025, Hobbs appointed Cruz to a seat on the Arizona Supreme Court, replacing Robert M. Brutinel.

== See also ==
- List of female state supreme court justices
- List of Hispanic and Latino American jurists

Legal offices
| Preceded by Robert M. Brutinel | Justice of the Arizona Supreme Court; 2025–present | Incumbent |
