= 2024 Phoenix mayoral election =

- November 5, 2024
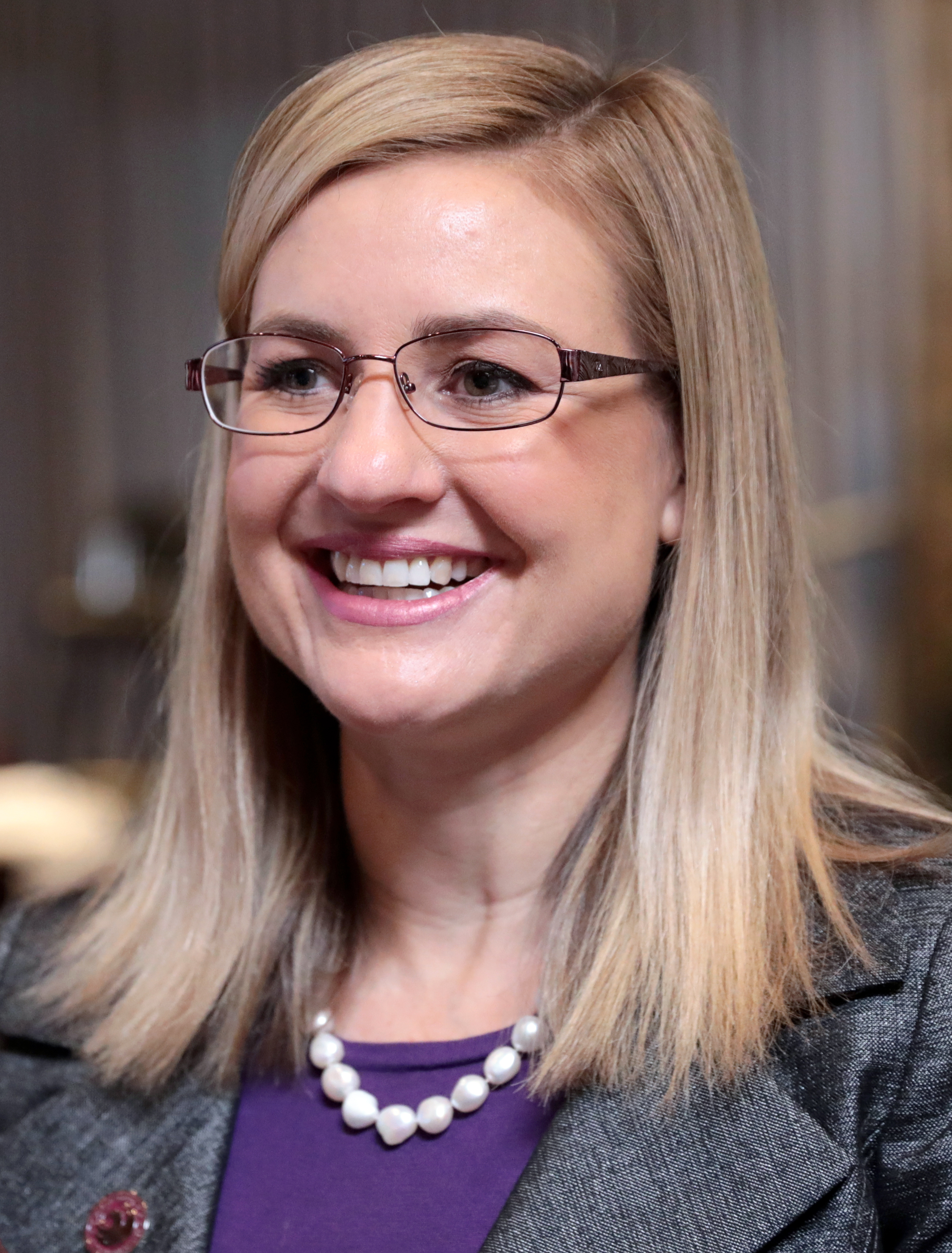

Candidate	Kate Gallego	Matt Evans
Party	Nonpartisan	Nonpartisan
Popular vote	346,144	210,698
Percentage	62.04%	37.77%
Mayor before election
Kate Gallego
Democratic
Elected mayor
Kate Gallego
Democratic

The 2024 Phoenix mayoral election was held on November 5, 2024, to elect the mayor of Phoenix, Arizona. Incumbent Mayor Kate Gallego ran for reelection as the favored candidate and won reelection in a landslide. A runoff would have been held on March 11, 2025, if no candidate received a majority of the vote. The election was held alongside elections to the city council, several city initiatives, and other Arizona elections.

== Candidates ==
=== Declared ===
- Matt Evans, software engineer
- Kate Gallego, incumbent mayor (2019–present)

== Results ==
2024 Phoenix mayoral election
Candidate	Votes	%
Kate Gallego (incumbent)	346,144	62.04%
Matt Evans	210,698	37.77%
Total votes	556,842	100%

== See also ==
- List of mayors of Phoenix
