= Jon W. Thompson =

American judge (1954–2019)

Judge of the Arizona Court of Appeals
- In office April 1995 – July 22, 2019
- Appointed by: Fife Symington
- Preceded by: Eino M. Jacobson
- Succeeded by: D. Steven Williams

Personal details
- Born: 1954
- Died: July 22, 2019 (aged 65) Phoenix, Arizona
- Education: Northern Arizona University; University of Colorado J.D.

Jon W. Thompson (1954 – July 22, 2019) was a Judge of the Arizona Court of Appeals from 1995 until his death in 2019.

== Early life and education ==
Thompson attended Glendale Community College before earning a bachelor's degree from Northern Arizona University in 1975 and received his Juris Doctor from the University of Colorado in 1979.

== Legal career ==
Thompson was a deputy county attorney in Coconino and Yuma counties. He then served as a judge pro tempore for the Coconino County Superior Court and worked in private practice in Flagstaff.

== Appointment to state court of appeals ==
Thompson was appointed to the court by Governor Fife Symington in 1995. He was retained by voters in 1998, 2004, 2010, and 2016. At the time of his death, Thompson was the state's second-longest serving appellate judge.

In 2018, Thompson authored a decision that rendered cannabis extracts like hash oil illegal, the state supreme court eventually reversed.
