= N. Warner Lee =

American lawyer and politician (born 1937)

18th Attorney General of Arizona
- In office July 1, 1974 – January 6, 1975
- Governor: Jack Williams
- Preceded by: Gary K. Nelson
- Succeeded by: Bruce Babbitt

Personal details
- Born: June 5, 1937 (age 87); Terre Haute, Indiana
- Political party: Republican

N. Warner Lee (born June 5, 1937) is an American lawyer and politician who served as the Attorney General of Arizona from 1974 to 1975.

Lee attended Arizona State University and the University of Arizona, getting his B.A. in 1960. He received his law school degree from the University of Arizona in 1965. He served as an assistant U.S. Attorney from 1970 to 1974. Lee was appointed Attorney General of Arizona in 1974 to fill the vacancy created by the resignation of Gary K. Nelson. He was defeated in the subsequent election by Democrat Bruce Babbitt. He then went into private practice. Lee eventually joined the Phoenix law firm Ryley Carlock & Applewhite.
