= Diane Johnsen =

American judge

Diane M. Johnsen

Judge of the Arizona Court of Appeals
- In office August 14, 2006 – January 2020
- Appointed by: Janet Napolitano
- Succeeded by: Cynthia Bailey

Personal details
- Born: 1953 or 1954 (age 72–73)
- Party: Democratic Party
- Education: University of Arizona; Stanford University (J.D.)

Diane M. Johnsen was a Judge of the Arizona Court of Appeals, Division One, having been appointed to the post in August 2006 by Governor Janet Napolitano. She retired in 2020.

Johnsen received her Bachelor of Arts summa cum laude from the University of Arizona in 1975. After working as a reporter for the Arizona Daily Star, Johnsen went on to receive her Juris Doctor in 1982 from Stanford Law School, where she had been an associate editor of the Stanford Law Review.

After leaving law school, Johnsen was a clerk to Ninth Circuit Court of Appeals Judge Benjamin Cushing Duniway. She was a commercial litigation attorney at Munger, Tolles & Olson in Los Angeles, California from 1983 to 1985 and at Osborn Maledon in Phoenix, Arizona from 1985 to 2006.

Johnsen was a board member of the Arizona Center for Law in the Public Interest from 1993 to 2006 and the Children's Action Alliance from 2004 to 2006.

== Publications ==
- "Building a Bench: A Close Look at State Appellate Courts Constructed by the Respective Methods of Judicial Selection", 53 San Diego L. Rev. 829 (2016).

Legal offices
Preceded by Jefferson L. Lankford	Judge of the Arizona Court of Appeals, Division One; August 2006–2020	Succeeded by Cynthia Bailey
