= Courts of Arizona =

Law courts in Arizona

Courts of Arizona include:

State courts of Arizona

- Arizona Supreme Court
  - Arizona Court of Appeals (2 divisions)
    - Superior Court of Arizona (15 counties)
      - Justices of the Peace (county courts) and Arizona Municipal Courts, city trial courts and courts of limited jurisdiction

Federal courts located in Arizona

- United States District Court for the District of Arizona
