= Peter Eckerstrom =

Arizona Court of Appeals judge

Peter J. Eckerstrom (born October 8, 1960) is a Judge of the Arizona Court of Appeals, Division Two, having been appointed to the post in 2003.

Born in St. James, Minnesota, Eckerstrom received his Bachelor of Arts magna cum laude from Yale University in 1982 and his Juris Doctor with Distinction from Stanford Law School in 1986. In 2018, he received a Master of Laws in Judicial Studies from the Duke University School of Law. His thesis for that degree, "The Garland Nomination, the Senate's Duty and the Surprising Lessons of Constitutional Text" has been published by the University of Pennsylvania Journal of Constitutional law. 21 PA.J.Const.L 33 (2018)

Obtaining his license to practice law in California in 1986 and in Arizona in 1988, Eckerstrom was an Assistant Public Defender in Pima County, Arizona from 1988 to 1994. He was a criminal defense attorney from 1994 until 2003, when he was appointed to the Court of Appeals.

In June 2014, the judges of Division Two of the Court of Appeals selected Eckerstrom to be the Chief Judge of that court for a five-year term.

Eckerstrom resides in Tucson.
