= James Beene =

American judge (born 1965)

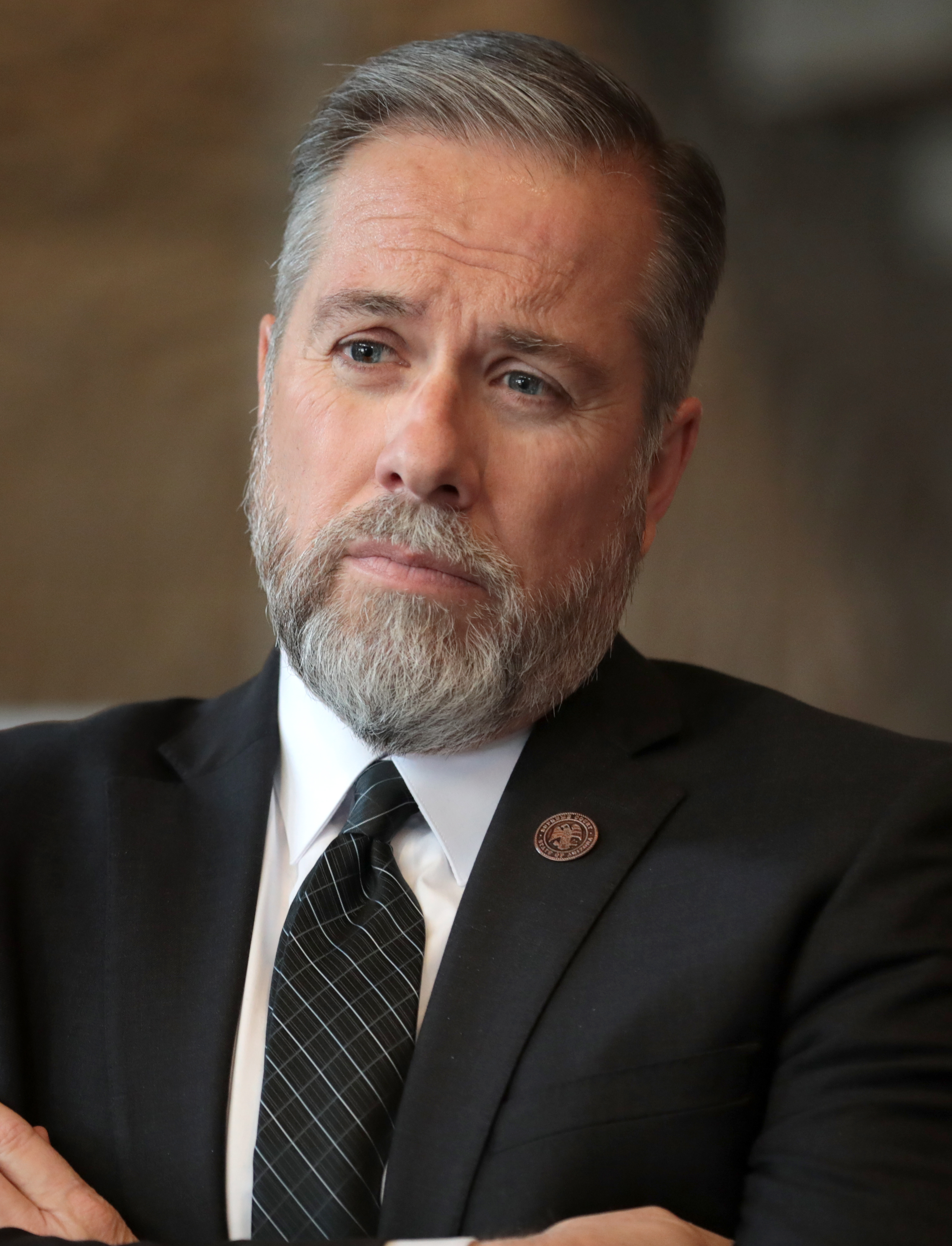

Justice of the Arizona Supreme Court
- Incumbent
- Assumed office April 26, 2019
- Appointed by: Doug Ducey
- Preceded by: John Pelander

Personal details
- Born: 1965 (age 59–60)
- Political party: Republican
- Education: University of California, Santa Barbara (BS); University of Arizona (JD)

James Patrick Beene (born 1965) is an American lawyer who has served a justice of the Arizona Supreme Court since 2019.

== Early life and education ==
Beene is a graduate of the University of California at Santa Barbara, where he received a bachelor's degree in political science. He graduated from the University of Arizona College of Law in 1991.

== Career ==
After graduating law school, Beene worked as a prosecutor in the Maricopa County Attorney's Office. He also worked in the appellate section of the Arizona Attorney General's Office.

=== State judicial service ===
He spent seven years as a judge of the Maricopa County Superior Court, and then was appointed to the Arizona Court of Appeals on December 9, 2016.

=== Appointment to Arizona Supreme Court ===
On April 26, 2019, Governor Doug Ducey announced his appointment of Beene to be a justice of the Supreme Court of Arizona. He was appointed to the seat left vacant by the retirement of John Pelander. He was sworn in on June 3, 2019, by Arizona Secretary of State Katie Hobbs.

Beene was retained by voters in 2022, receiving 70.53% yes votes.

== See also ==
- List of Hispanic and Latino American jurists

Legal offices
Preceded by John Pelander	Justice of the Arizona Supreme Court; 2019–present	Incumbent
