= Arizona Court of Appeals =

Intermediate appellate court for the state of Arizona

The Arizona Court of Appeals is the intermediate appellate court for the state of Arizona. It is divided into two divisions, with a total of twenty-eight judges on the court: nineteen in Division 1, based in Phoenix, and nine in Division 2, based in Tucson.

== History ==
The Arizona constitution was amended in 1960 to authorize a court of appeals, which the legislature created in 1964. The original judges were elected in November 1964. The first judges were James Duke Cameron, Henry S. Stevens, and Francis J. Donofrio for Division 1, and Herbert F. Krucker, John F. Molloy, and James D. Hathaway for Division 2. Only one judge after the original six received their seat by election. After the introduction of merit selection in 1975, judges are appointed by the governor to fill vacancies or new positions.

Three-judge panels were added to Division 1 in 1969, 1974, 1982, and 1989. Another judge was added in 1995 "so that the Chief Judge could devote time to the court's increasing administrative workload." Division 2 added three judges in 1985. Six more judges were added in 2022, three for each division.

== Jurisdiction ==
The Court of Appeals has jurisdiction to consider appeals in civil cases, including juvenile and domestic relations matters, from the Arizona Superior Court. The court also reviews workers’ compensation and unemployment benefits decisions, tax court decisions, and certain corporation commission decisions.

The court also has jurisdiction over appeals in criminal matters from superior court, except for cases in which a death sentence has been imposed. Death penalty cases go directly to the Supreme Court of Arizona.

The court may also decide "petitions for special action," which is Arizona's term for petitions for special writs, such as certiorari, mandamus, prohibition, and interlocutory appeals.

== Procedures ==
=== Selection of judges ===
Judges are selected by a modified form of the Missouri Plan. A bipartisan commission considers applicants and sends a list of nominees to the governor. The governor is required by law to appoint from this list based on merit, without regard to party affiliation. Judges are then retained for an initial period, after which they are subject to a retention election. If the judge wins the election, his/her term is six years.

=== Deciding cases ===
The Court of Appeals decides cases in panels of three judges, called "departments." Each department chooses a presiding judge from among the three. Each division also has a Chief Judge and Vice Chief Judge, elected by all judges in the division.

=== Divisions ===
While the Court of Appeals is divided into two geographic divisions in Phoenix and Tucson, the superior courts are bound by all of the Court of Appeals decisions, regardless of the division they are issued in. An Arizona trial court is not required to give greater precedent to a Court of Appeals decision from the division it is located in then a decision from the other division.

- Division 1 consists of Maricopa, Yuma, La Paz, Mohave, Coconino, Yavapai, Navajo and Apache counties.
- Division 2 consists of Pima, Pinal, Cochise, Santa Cruz, Greenlee, Graham and Gila counties.

At least ten judges of Division 1 must be residents of Maricopa County and five residents of the remaining counties. Four may be from any county. At least four judges of Division 2 must be residents of Pima County and two residents of the remaining counties. Three may be from any county.

Division 1 has statewide responsibility for appeals from the Industrial Commission and unemployment compensation rulings of the Department of Economic Security. One department of Division 1 is responsible for appeals from the Tax Court.

== Court members ==
=== Division 1 ===
The members of Arizona Court of Appeals Division 1, by order of seniority, include:

Name	Start	Appointer	Chief Term	County	Law school	Source
Randall Howe, Chief Judge	April 11, 2012	Jan Brewer (R)	2025–present	Maricopa	ASU	12
Michael Brown	January 2, 2007	Janet Napolitano (D)	2015–2017	Navajo	ASU	MJB
Kent Cattani	February 9, 2013	Jan Brewer (R)	2021–2023	Maricopa	Berkeley	12
Jennifer Perkins	October 30, 2017	Doug Ducey (R)	—	Maricopa	SMU	12
James Morse	November 6, 2017	Doug Ducey (R)	—	Maricopa	Virginia	12
David Weinzweig, Vice Chief Judge	December 29, 2017	Doug Ducey (R) (Note: Was registered as an Independent at the time of appointment)	—	Maricopa	ASU	12
Steven Williams	November 1, 2019	Doug Ducey (R)	—	Navajo	ASU	12
Cynthia Bailey	April 24, 2020	Doug Ducey (R)	—	Maricopa	ASU	12
Brian Furuya	December 23, 2020	Doug Ducey (R)	—	Coconino	BYU	12
Angela Paton	October 8, 2021	Doug Ducey (R)	—	Maricopa	ASU	12
Michael Catlett	December 29, 2022	Doug Ducey (R)	—	Maricopa	ASU	12
Anni Hill Foster	December 29, 2022	Doug Ducey (R)	—	Maricopa	Gonzaga	12
Daniel Kiley	December 29, 2022	Doug Ducey (R)	—	Maricopa	ASU	12
Andrew Jacobs	February 23, 2023	Katie Hobbs (D)	—	Maricopa	Harvard	12
Veronika Fabian	May 16, 2025	Katie Hobbs (D)	—	Coconino	Michigan	12
Andrew Becke	May 16, 2025	Katie Hobbs (D)	—	Yavapai	ASU	12
Andrew Gaona	February 6, 2026	Katie Hobbs (D)	—	Maricopa	ASU	12
Sheena Chiang	October 13, 2026	Katie Hobbs (D)	—	Maricopa	UofA	12
Alexander Samuels	October 13, 2026	Katie Hobbs (D)	—	Maricopa	Harvard	12

=== Division 2 ===
The members of Arizona Court of Appeals, Division 2 include:

Name	Start	Appointer	Chief Term	County	Law school	Source
Christopher Staring, Chief Judge	2015	Doug Ducey (R)	2024–present	Pima	Tulane	CPS
Peter Eckerstrom	2003	Janet Napolitano (D)	2014–2019	Pima	Stanford	PJE
Garye Vasquez	2005	Janet Napolitano (D)	2019–2024	Pinal	ASU	GVL
Karl Eppich, Vice Chief Judge	2017	Doug Ducey (R)	—	Pinal	Stanford	12
Sean Brearcliffe	September 20, 2017	Doug Ducey (R)	—	Pima	Golden Gate	12
Jeffrey Sklar	December 12, 2022	Doug Ducey (R)	—	Pima	USC	12
Lacey Gard	December 29, 2022	Doug Ducey (R)	—	Pinal	ASU	12
Michael Kelly	December 29, 2022	Doug Ducey (R)	—	Pinal	ASU	12
Christopher O’Neil	December 29, 2022	Doug Ducey (R)	—	Pima	ASU	12

== Former judges ==
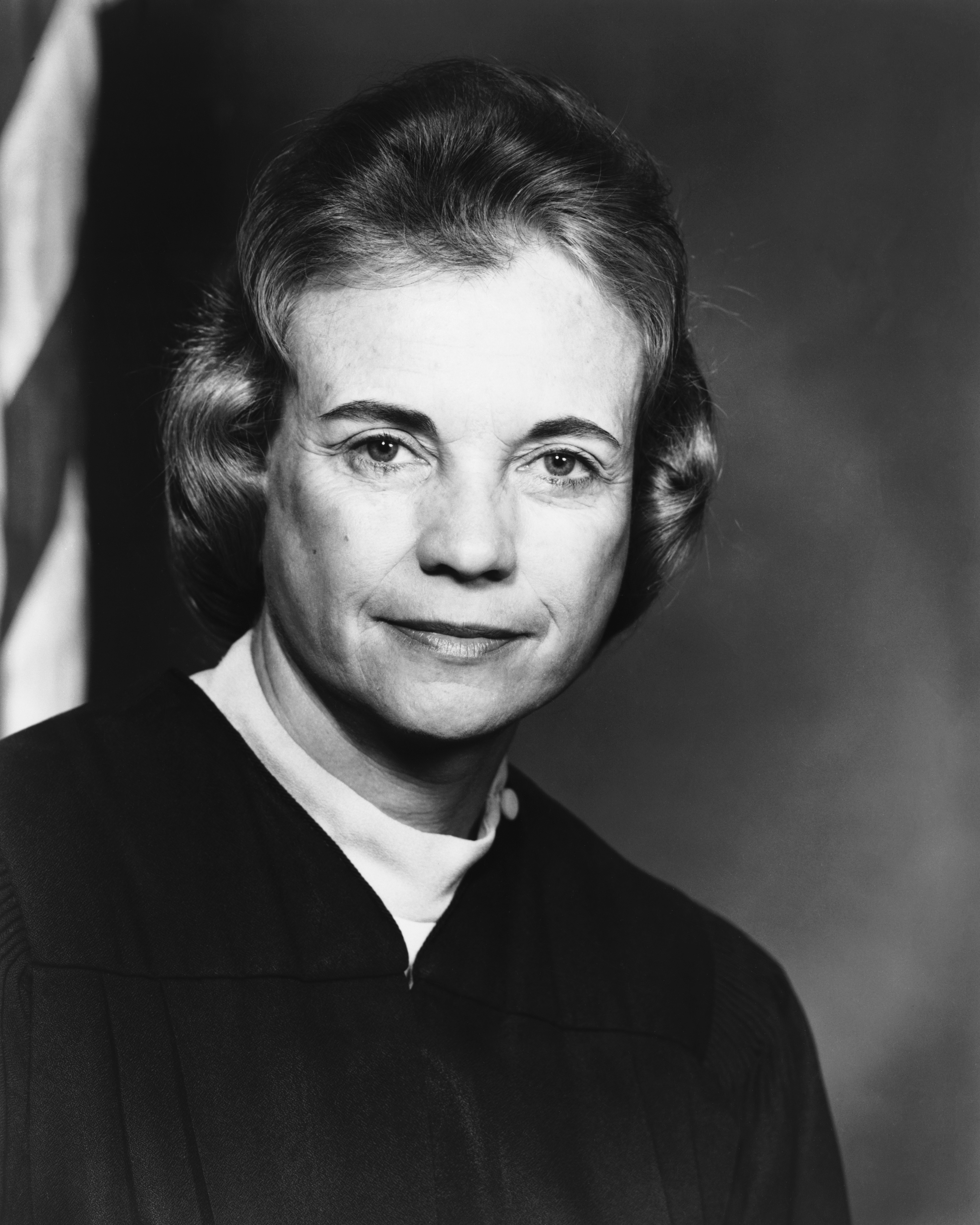
Supreme Court Justice Sandra Day O'Connor served on the court from 1979 to 1981

Several court of appeal judges were elevated to the Arizona Supreme Court, including: James Duke Cameron (1965–1971), Robert J. Corcoran (1981–1988), Ruth McGregor (1989–1998), Michael D. Ryan (1996–2002), Rebecca White Berch (1998–2002), Ann Timmer (2000–2012), Andrew Gould (2012–2017), James Beene (2017–2019), and Maria Elena Cruz (2017–2025).

Other notable former judges include:

- Gary K. Nelson (1974–1978), former Arizona Attorney General.
- Mary M. Schroeder (1975–1979), current Senior Judge on the Ninth Circuit.
- Sandra Day O'Connor (1979–1981), former United States Supreme Court Justice.
- Sarah D. Grant (1982–1999).
- Jon W. Thompson (1995–2019), died in office.
- G. Murray Snow (2002–2008), current District Judge.
- Diane Johnsen (2006–2019).

== See also ==
- Courts of Arizona
