= Snell & Wilmer =

American law firm

- Headquarters: Phoenix, Arizona
- No. of offices: 18
- No. of attorneys: Over 550
- No. of employees: Nearly 1,000
- Major practice areas: Business Law Firm
- Key people: Barbara J. Dawson, Chair
- Date founded: 1938
- Founder: Frank Snell, Jr. and Mark Wilmer
- Website: swlaw.com

Snell & Wilmer is an American law firm based in Phoenix, Arizona. Founded in 1938, the firm represents clients ranging from large, publicly traded corporations, to small businesses, individuals and entrepreneurs. Barbara J. Dawson has served as chair since April 2023, when she succeeded Matthew P. Feeney.

== History ==
Snell & Wilmer traces its origins to 1934, when attorneys Frank L. Snell, Jr., Riney Salmon, and Charles Strouss began practicing together in Phoenix. Mark Wilmer joined the firm in 1938, and the firm later became known as Snell & Wilmer.

From 1956 to 1958, firm co-founder Mark Wilmer led the legal team representing Arizona in Arizona v. California, a water-rights dispute with California over the Colorado River. The U.S. Supreme Court ruled in Arizona's favor in 1963, a decision that enabled the construction of the Central Arizona Project.

After World War II, attorneys Joseph T. Melczer, Jr., James Walsh, and Edwin Beauchamp joined the firm, which was then known as Snell, Wilmer, Walsh, Melczer & Beauchamp. The firm shortened its name to Snell & Wilmer around 1950, after Walsh departed to become a U.S. District Court judge.

In 1993, the firm's long-standing relationship with major client Arizona Public Service Company (APS) was strained after a whistleblower lawsuit alleged that an APS employee had been passed over for a job in retaliation for reporting safety violations at the Palo Verde Nuclear Generating Station. APS's president and CEO publicly criticized the firm's handling of the case's discovery process as "improper and ineffective," and the two Snell & Wilmer attorneys who had handled the litigation were removed from the account, though APS continued its relationship with the firm.
