= Arizona Superior Court =

Arizona state court of general jurisdiction

The Superior Court of the State of Arizona is the Arizona state court of general jurisdiction.

== Jurisdiction ==
The Constitution of Arizona provides the Superior Court with jurisdiction over:

- concurrent jurisdiction over cases and proceedings in which exclusive jurisdiction is not vested by law in another court;
- equity cases that involve title to or possession of real property or the legality of any tax, assessment, toll or municipal ordinance;
- other cases in which the value of property in question is $1,000 or more, exclusive of interest and costs;
- felonies;
- misdemeanors not otherwise provided for by law;
- forcible entry and detainer actions (evictions);
- proceedings in insolvency (bankruptcy is handled in federal court);
- nuisances;
- proceedings in probate;
- dissolution or annulment of marriages (divorces); and
- naturalization and the issuance of appropriate documents for these events.

== Divisions ==
Under Article 6, section 13, of the Arizona Constitution, "[t]he superior courts provided for in this section shall constitute a single court, composed of all the duly elected or appointed judges in each of the counties of the state." In this sense, the single Superior Court of the State of Arizona is divided into fifteen divisions, conterminous with the fifteen counties of Arizona. Officially, each Superior Court division is styled the "Superior Court of the State of Arizona in and for the County of (County)". For example, the Superior Court division located in Coconino County is officially the, "Superior Court of the State of Arizona in and for the County of Coconino." However, since each county elects the sheriff, clerk, attorney, public defender, legal defender, and attorney of its branch and owns and operates the building(s) in which it is located, they are authorized to use variations of the name in informal documents. For example, Maricopa County refers to its branch as "The Judicial Branch of Arizona in Maricopa County."

Since 2015, the Maricopa County Superior Court has included a specialized business court docket, known as the Commercial Court. The "Commercial Court is a specialty calendar within the Civil Department to resolve controversies that arise in commercial settings expeditiously and cost effectively."

== Arizona Tax Court ==
A separate division of the superior court in Maricopa County serves as the Arizona Tax Court and has statewide jurisdiction over disputes that involves the imposition, assessment or collection of a tax.

== See also ==
- Courts of Arizona
