= Arizona Supreme Court =

Highest court in the U.S. state of Arizona

Coordinates: 33°26′51″N 112°05′33″W

- Seal of the Arizona Supreme Court
- Interactive map of Arizona Supreme Court
- Established: 1912
- Jurisdiction: Arizona
- Location: Phoenix, Arizona
- Composition method: Missouri plan with retention elections
- Authorised by: Arizona Constitution
- Appeals to: Supreme Court of the United States (questions of federal or constitutional law only)
- Judge term length: 6 years
- Number of positions: 7
- Website: Official site

Chief Justice
- Currently: Ann Timmer
- Since: July 1, 2024
- Lead position ends: June 30, 2029

The Arizona Supreme Court is the state supreme court of the U.S. state of Arizona. Sitting in the Supreme Court building in downtown Phoenix, the court consists of a chief justice, a vice chief justice, and five associate justices. Each justice is appointed by the governor of Arizona from a list recommended by a bipartisan commission. Justices stand for retention in an election two years after their appointment and then every six years. They must retire at age 70.

== Court history ==
The court started in 1912 with three justices. Alfred Franklin, Donnell L. Cunningham, and Henry D. Ross took office on February 14, 1912. In 1949, the Court expanded from three to five justices. In 2016 it was further expanded from five to seven justices. This expansion was criticized at the time by some as court packing.

The jurisdiction of the court is prescribed by Article VI, Section 5 of the Arizona Constitution. Most of the appeals heard by the court go through the Arizona Court of Appeals, except for death penalty cases, over which the Arizona Supreme Court has sole appellate jurisdiction. The court also has original jurisdiction in a few other circumstances as outlined in the Arizona Constitution. A quorum is three, but the whole court must sit in order to declare a law unconstitutional.

== Selection of justices ==
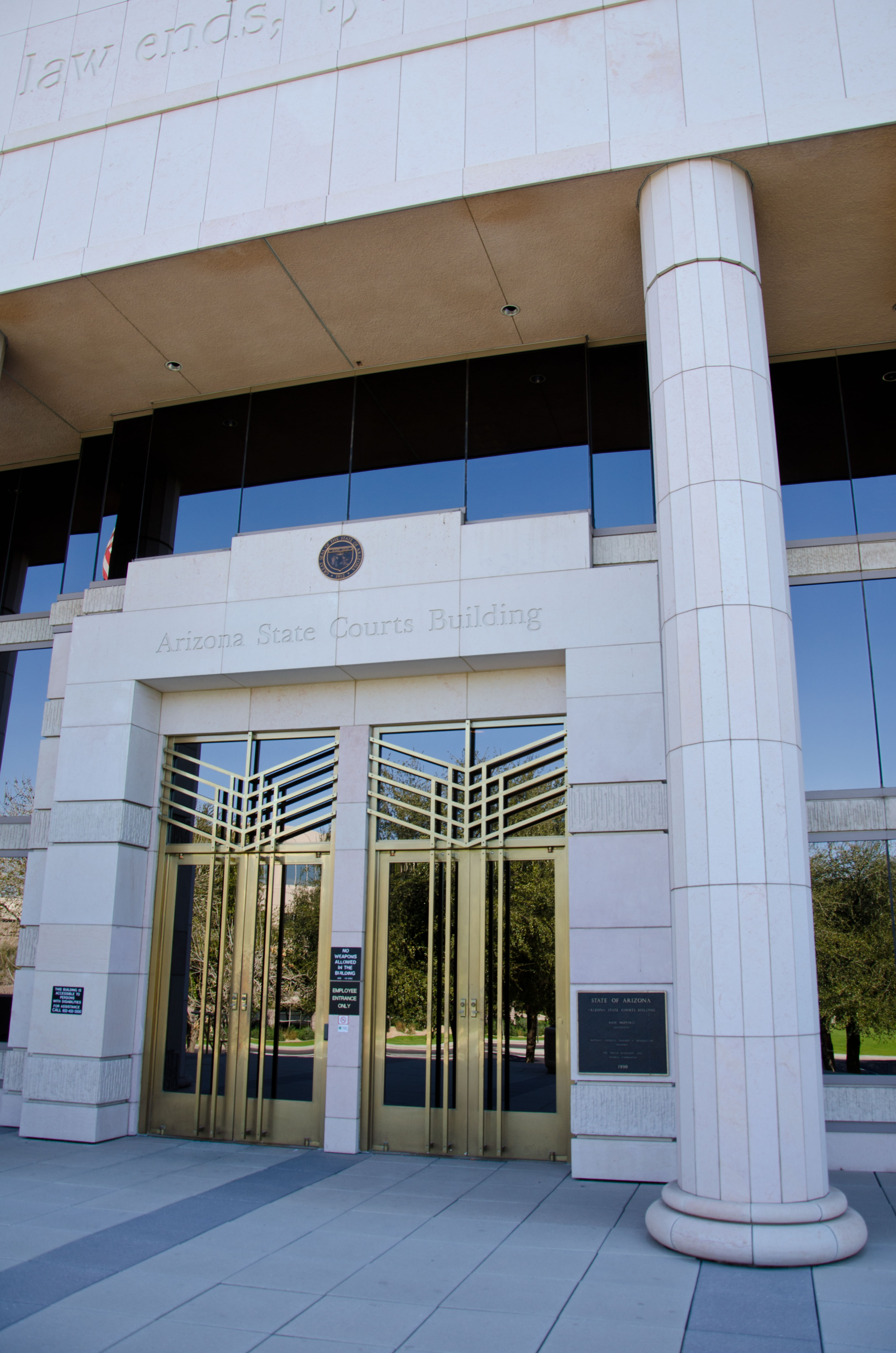
Arizona Supreme Court Building in downtown Phoenix.

The chief justice is chosen for a five-year term by the court, and is eligible for re-election. They supervise the administration of all the inferior courts. They are chairman of the Commission on Appellate Court Appointments, which nominates candidates to fill vacancies in the appellate courts. If the governor fails to appoint one of the nominated candidates within sixty days of their names being submitted to her or him, the chief justice makes the appointment.

The vice chief justice, who acts as chief justice in the latter's "absence or incapacity," is chosen by the court for a term determined by the court.

Justices are selected by a modified form of the Missouri Plan. A bipartisan commission considers applicants and sends a list of nominees to the governor. The governor is required by law to appoint from this list based on merit, without regard to party affiliation. Justices are then retained for an initial period, after which they are subject to a retention election. If the justice wins the election, their term is six years.

Between February and April 2024, the Arizona Senate (with all Republican state senators approving and all Democratic state senators objecting) passed a resolution to change the Arizona Supreme Court term length from six years to lifetime, which would apply retroactively and override the result of the November 2024 Arizona Supreme Court retention elections. The resolution was approved by the Arizona House of Representatives and sent to voters as Prop 137 for the November 2024 election. Prop 137 was overwhelmingly rejected, with 77.7% of voters voting "no".

=== Qualifications ===
- Admitted to the practice of law in Arizona and be a resident of Arizona for the 10 years before taking office;
- May not practice law while a member of the judiciary;
- May not hold any other political office or public employment;
- May not hold office in any political party;
- May not campaign, except for themselves; and,
- Must retire at age 70.

== Justices ==
The current Arizona Supreme Court includes:

Name	Born	Start	Term ends (Note: Term ends Dec. 31 of the year listed.)	Mandatory retirement	Appointer	Law School
Ann Timmer, Chief Justice	September 12, 1960 (age 66)	October 12, 2012 (Note: Elected Chief Justice on July 1, 2024)	2028	2030	Jan Brewer (R)	ASU
John Lopez IV, Vice Chief Justice	1968 (age 57–58)	December 19, 2016 (Note: Elected Vice Chief Justice on July 1, 2024)	2032	2038	Doug Ducey (R)	ASU
Clint Bolick	December 26, 1957 (age 68)	January 6, 2016	2030	2027	Doug Ducey (R)	UC Davis
James Beene	1965 (age 60–61)	April 26, 2019	2028	2035	Doug Ducey (R)	Arizona
Bill Montgomery	March 2, 1967 (age 59)	September 6, 2019	2028	2037	Doug Ducey (R)	ASU
Kathryn Hackett King	1980 (age 45–46)	July 8, 2021	2030	2050	Doug Ducey (R)	Arizona
Maria Elena Cruz	1972 (age 53–54)	February 3, 2025	2028	2042	Katie Hobbs (D)	Arizona

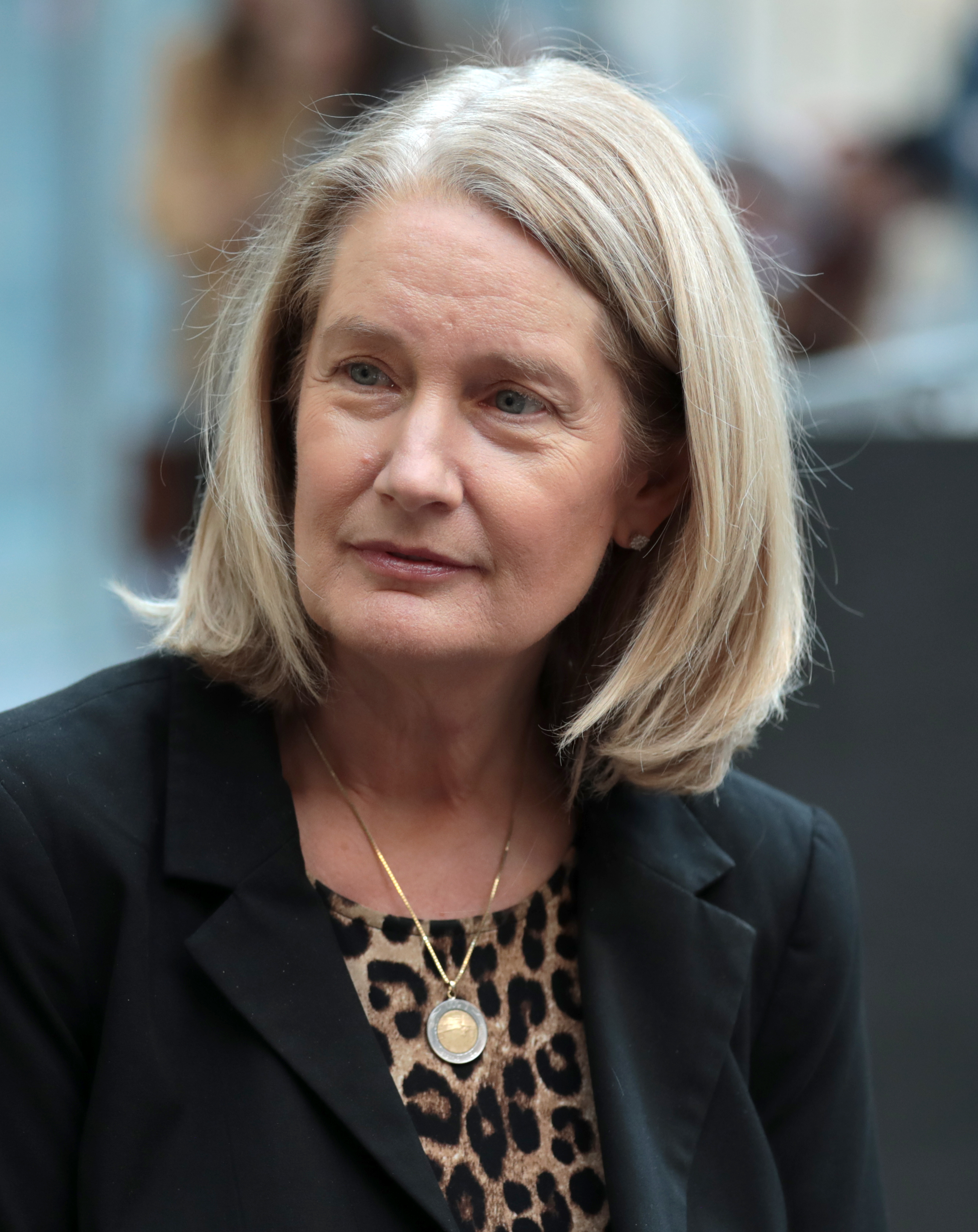
Chief Justice Ann Timmer

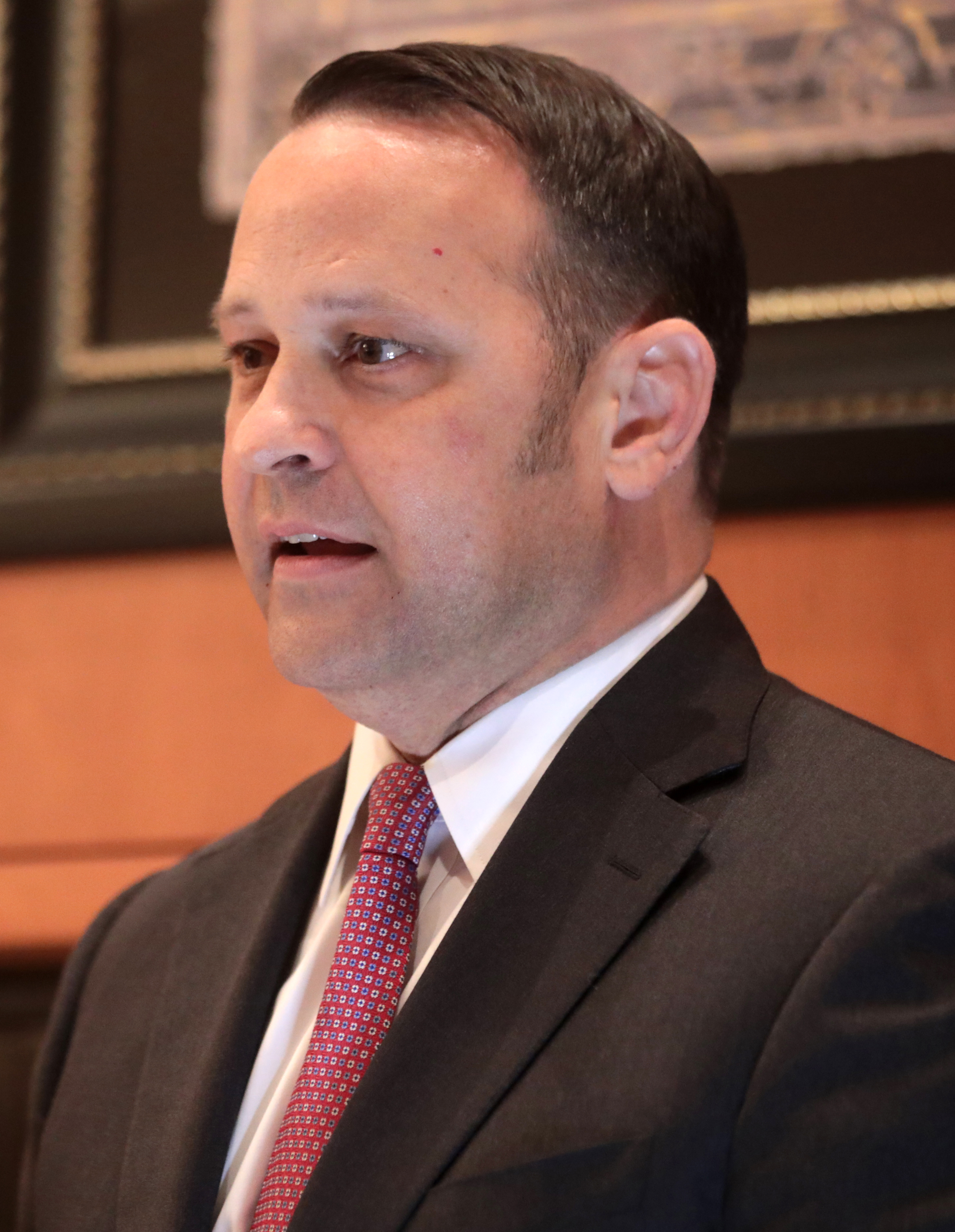
Vice Chief Justice John Lopez IV

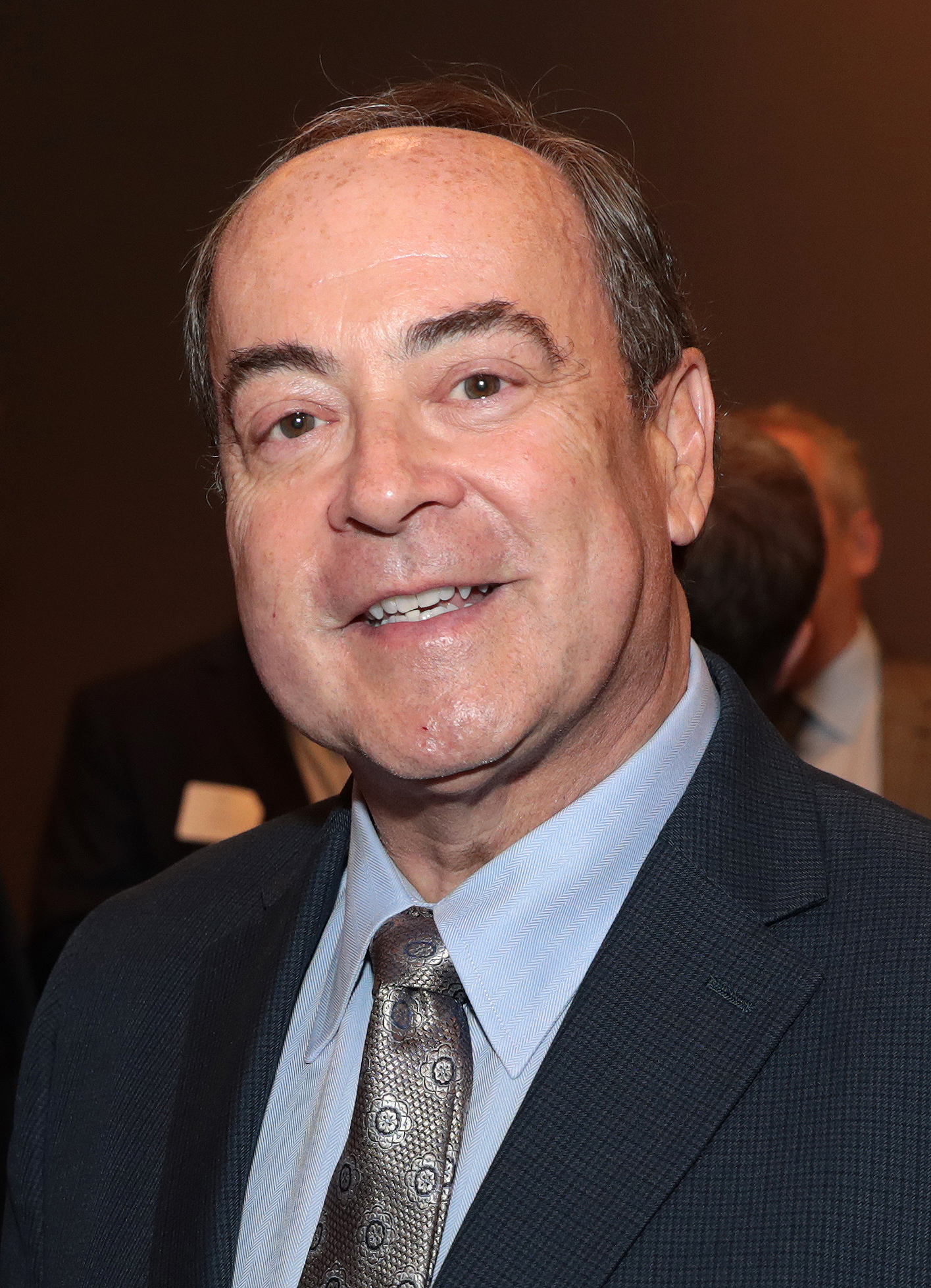
Justice Clint Bolick

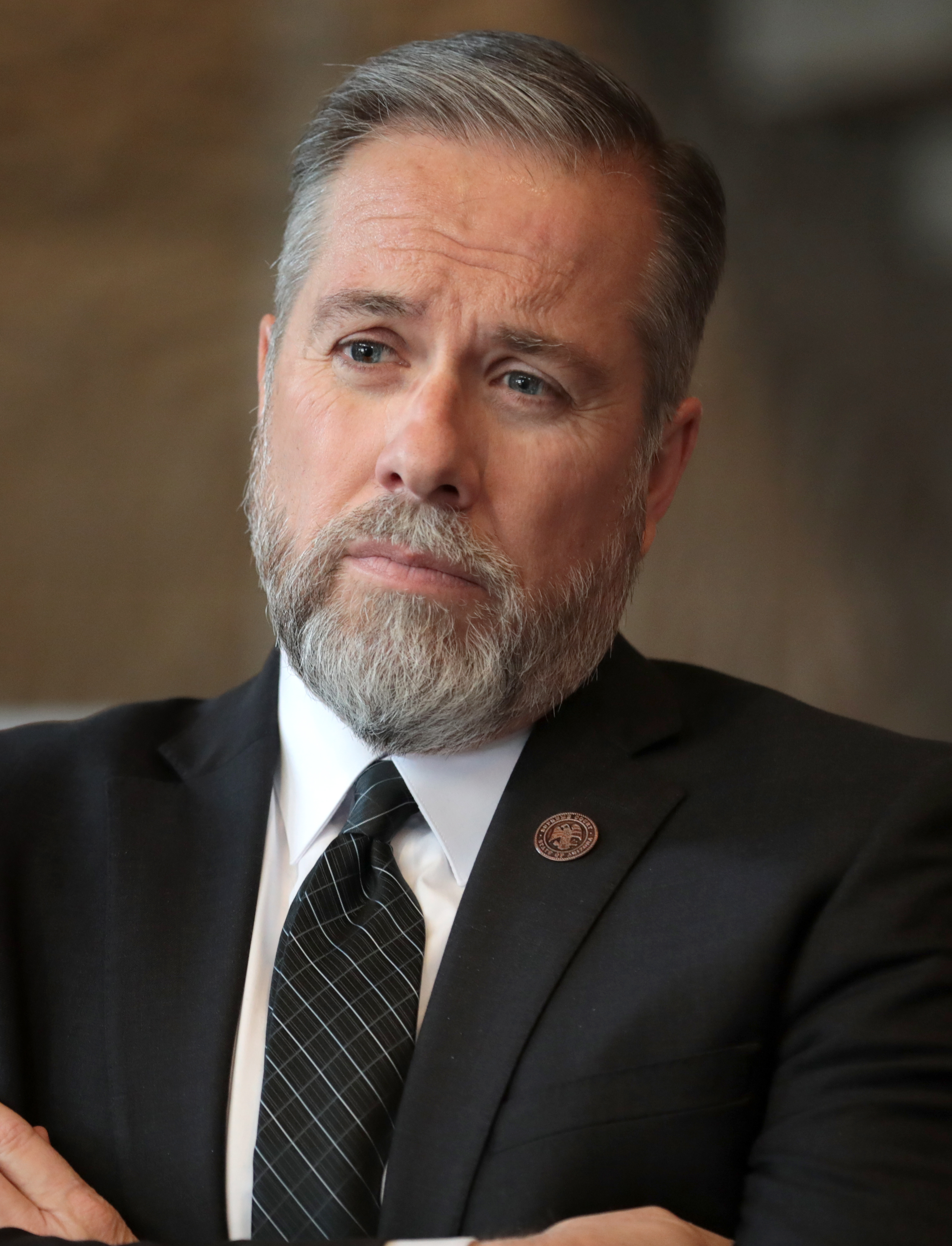
Justice James Beene

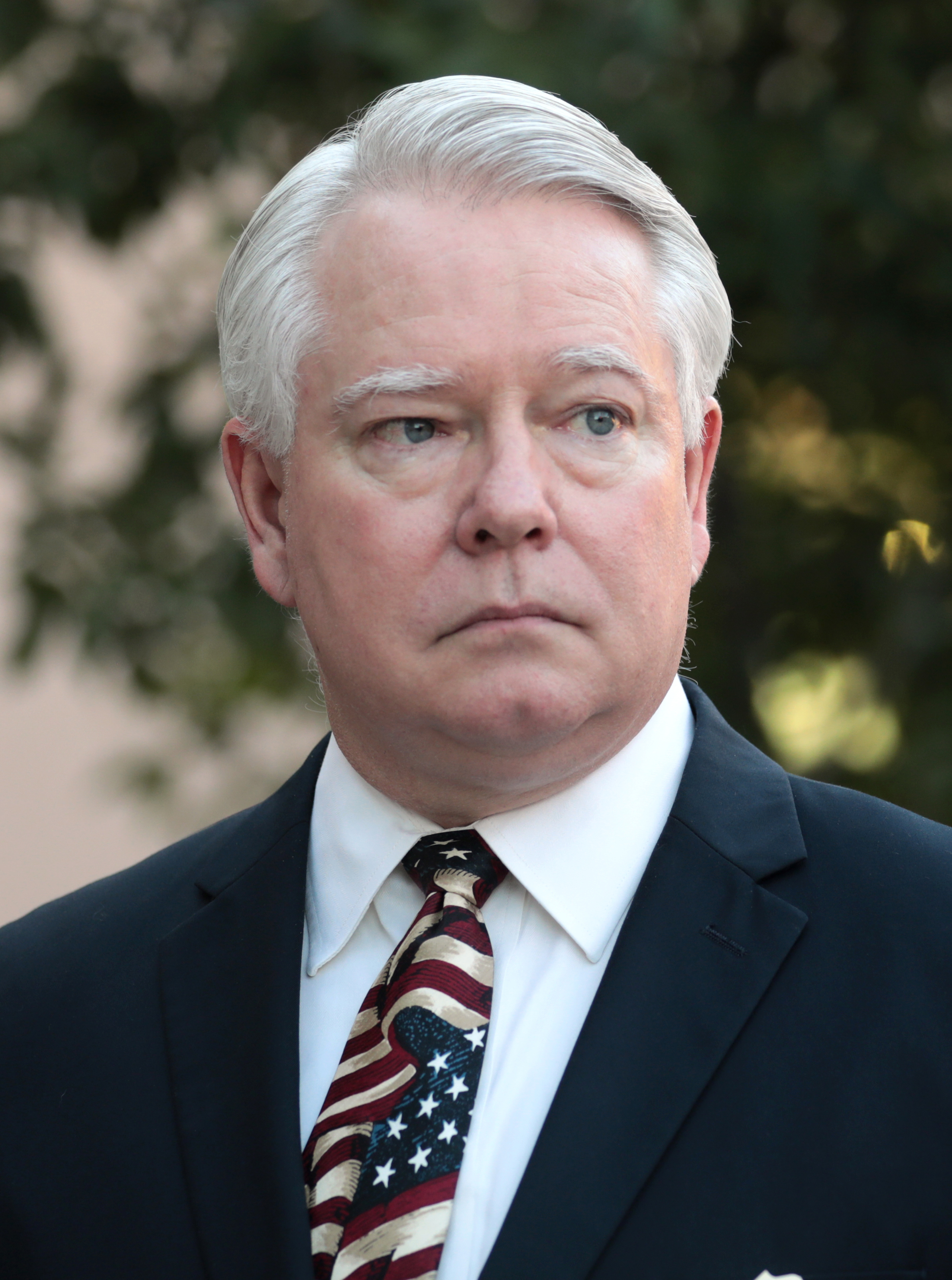
Justice Bill Montgomery

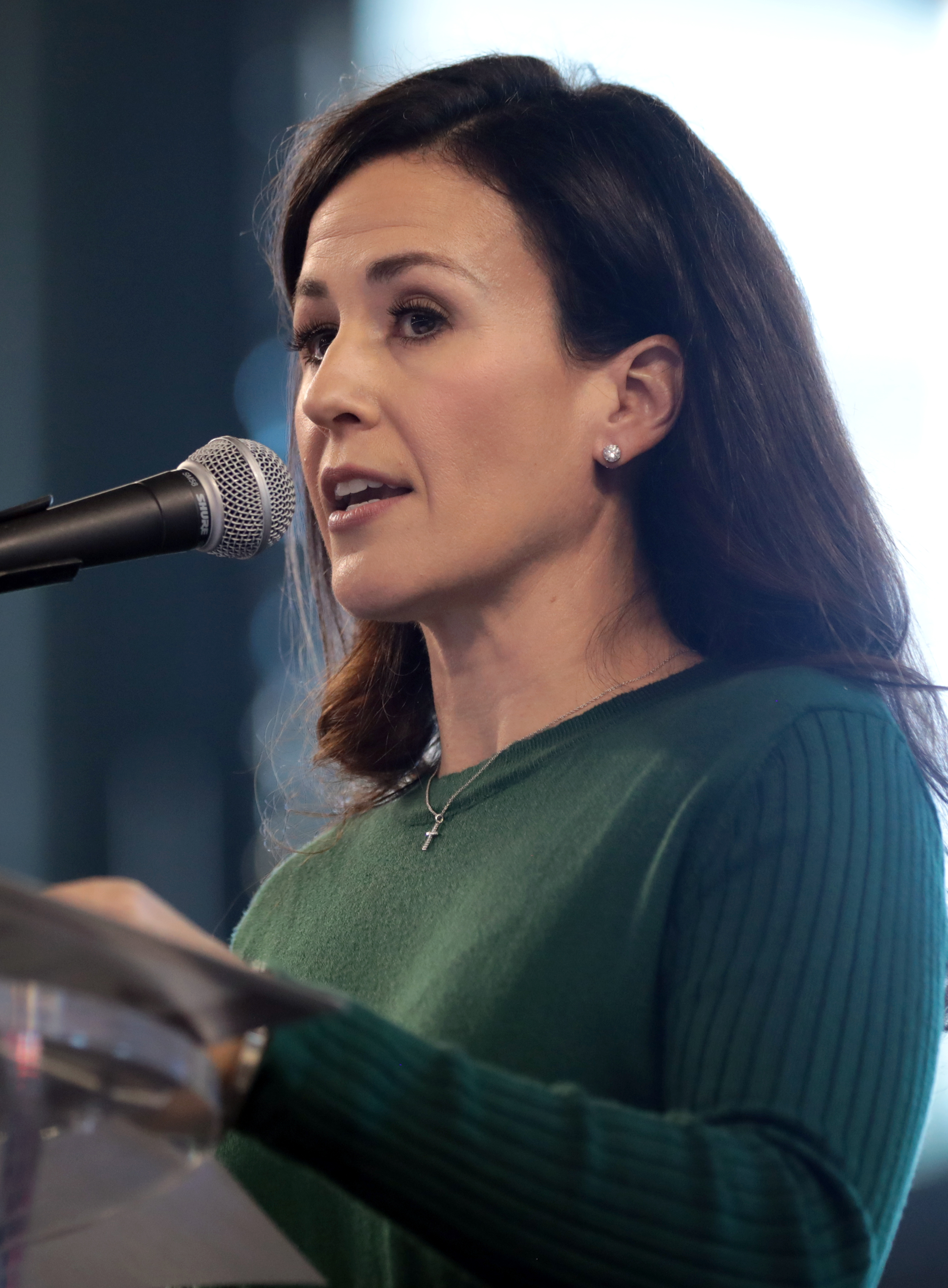
Justice Kathryn Hackett King

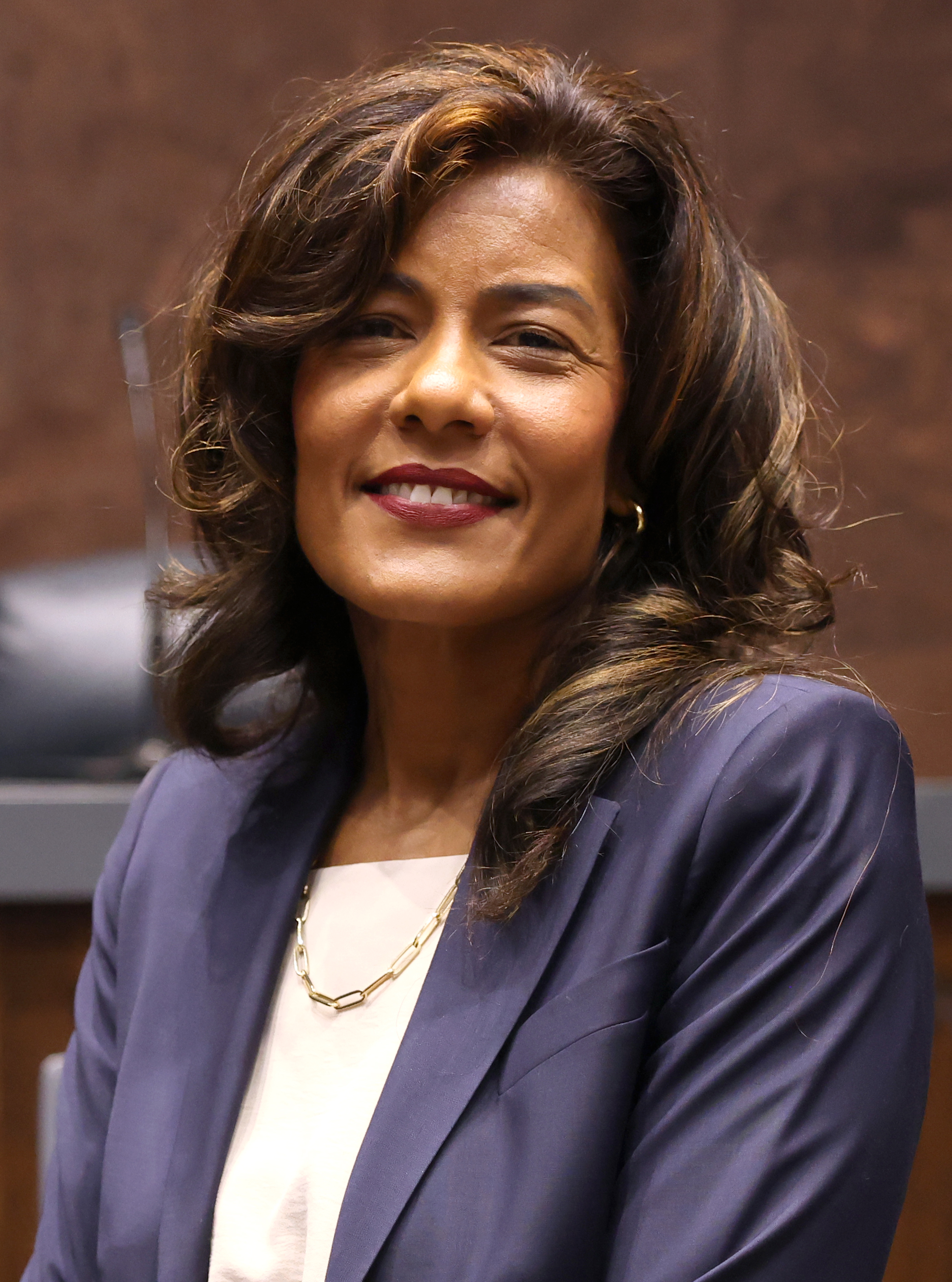
Justice Maria Elena Cruz

== Chief Justices ==
- Alfred Franklin (1912–1914, 1917)
- Henry D. Ross (1915–1916, 1921–1922, 1927–1928, 1933–1934, 1939–1940, 1945)
- Donnell L. Cunningham (1918–1920)
- Archibald G. McAlister (1923–1926, 1931–1932, 1937–1938, 1943–1944)
- Alfred C. Lockwood (1929–1930, 1935–1936, 1941–1942)
- Rawghlie Clement Stanford (1945–1948)
- Arthur T. LaPrade (1949–1950, 1955–1956)
- Levi Stewart Udall (1951–1952)
- Rawghlie Clement Stanford (1953–1953)
- Marlin T. Phelps (1954–1954, 1959)
- Levi Stewart Udall (1957–1958)
- Fred C. Struckmeyer Jr. (1960–1961, 1966, 1971, 1980–1981)
- Charles C. Bernstein (1962–1963, 1967–1967)
- Jesse Addison Udall (1964–1964, 1969)
- Lorna E. Lockwood (1965–1965, 1970) (First female chief justice in the United States)
- Ernest McFarland (1968–1968)
- Jack D. H. Hays (1972–1974)
- James Duke Cameron (1975–1979)
- William A. Holohan (1982–1987)
- Frank Gordon Jr. (1987–1992)
- Stanley G. Feldman (1992–1997)
- Thomas A. Zlaket (1997–2002)
- Charles E. Jones (2002–2005)
- Ruth McGregor (2005–2009)
- Rebecca White Berch (2009–2014)
- Scott Bales (2014–2019)
- Robert M. Brutinel (2019–2024)
- Ann Timmer (2024–present)

== Notable cases ==
- Harrison v. Laveen, 67 Ariz. 337, 196 P.2d 456 (1948), a case in which the Court held that the state constitution's use of the phrase "persons under guardianship" applied only to judicial guardianship and had "no application to the plaintiffs or to the Federal status of Indians in Arizona as a class."
- Spur Industries, Inc. v. Del E. Webb Development Co., 108 Ariz. 178, 494 P.2d 700 (1972), a case addressing the principles of nuisance law.
- Planned Parenthood Arizona v. Mayes, CV-23-0005-PR (2024), a case upholding Arizona's abortion ban enacted in 1864.
- Sanchez v. Maricopa County, CV-24-0013-PR, a case ruling that a county's sheriff will be held liable for their deputies' negligence while on the job

== See also ==
- Arizona Bar Exam
- Courts of Arizona
