= Tombstone, Arizona =

City in Arizona, United States

Tombstone
- City
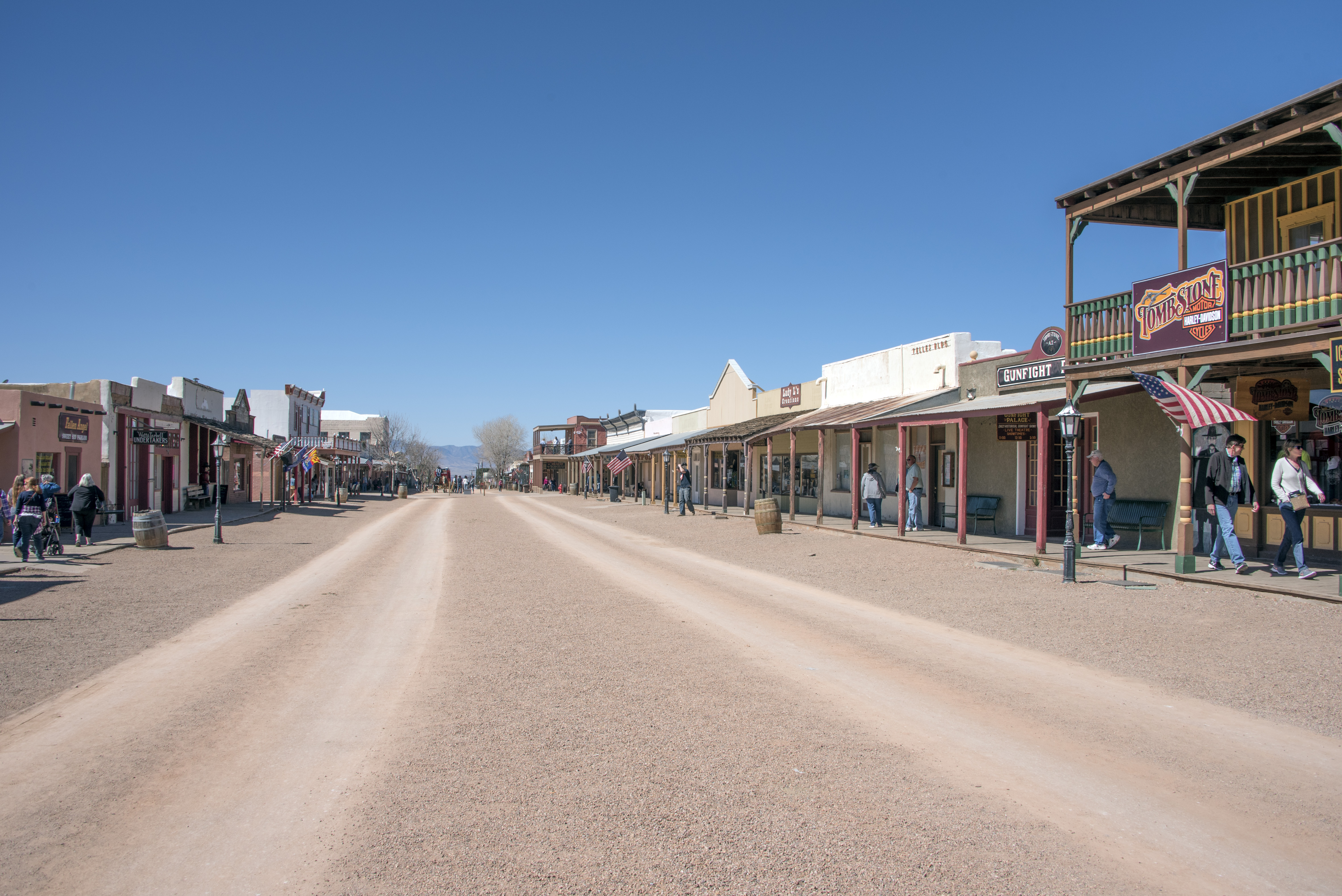
- Tombstone in 2018

- Seal
- Motto: The Town Too Tough To Die
- Location of Tombstone in Cochise County, Arizona
- Coordinates: 31°44′20″N 110°05′15″W
- Country: United States
- State: Arizona
- County: Cochise
- Founded: 1879
- Incorporated: 1881

Government
  - Mayor: Dusty Escapule

Area
  - Total: 9.25 sq mi (23.96 km^{2})
  - Land: 9.25 sq mi (23.96 km^{2})
  - Water: 0 sq mi (0.00 km^{2})
- Elevation: 4,406 ft (1,343 m)

Population (2020)
  - Total: 1,308
  - Density: 141.4/sq mi (54.59/km^{2})
- Time zone: UTC−07:00 (MST (no DST))
- ZIP Code: 85638
- Area code: 520
- FIPS code: 04-74400
- GNIS feature ID: 2412081
- Website: cityoftombstoneaz.gov

Tombstone is a city in Cochise County, Arizona, United States. It was founded in 1879 by Ed Schieffelin, a prospector in what was then Pima County, Arizona Territory. It was one of the many boomtowns founded in the southwestern United States in that era. The most productive silver mining district in Arizona, it produced some $40 to $85 million in silver bullion (equivalent to about $1.43 billion to $3.05 billion today).

Best known as the site of the gunfight at the O.K. Corral, the city draws most of its revenue from tourism. According to the 2020 census, the city had a permanent population of 1,308. Tombstone has frequently been noted on lists of unusual place names.

== History ==
Tombstone was founded on land historically inhabited by the Hohokam people, who lived in southern Arizona for over 2,000 years. The town was established in 1879 on a mesa above the Goodenough Mine. By 1880, the town had many saloons, gambling halls, dance halls, and brothels. It also boasted four churches, three newspapers, two banks, an ice house, and an ice cream parlor. In those days, the more respectable denizens of Tombstone attended theatrical productions presented by visiting troupes at the Schieffelin Hall, while the miners and cowboys preferred shows at the Bird Cage Theatre.

Underlying political tensions rapidly escalated as the population increased. The townspeople and the owners of the mines were largely from the Northern states, while the ranchers were mostly Confederate sympathizers. Only 30 miles (48 km) from the Mexico–United States border, the city was a market for cattle stolen from ranches in Sonora, Mexico, by a loosely organized band of outlaws known as the Cochise County Cowboys. The Earp brothers (Wyatt, Virgil and Morgan) and Doc Holliday had ongoing conflicts with Cowboys Ike and Billy Clanton, Frank and Tom McLaury, and Billy Claiborne. The Cowboys repeatedly threatened the Earps, until the conflict escalated into a gunfight on October 26, 1881. Although the gunfight is often portrayed as occurring at the O.K. Corral, it actually occurred a short distance away, in an empty lot on Fremont Street.

Beginning in 1880, the silver mines penetrated the water table, requiring the installation of pumps to dewater the mines. In 1886, a fire destroyed the pumping station, and it was deemed unprofitable to rebuild the costly pumps. The city nearly became a ghost town, saved only by the fact that it was the seat of Cochise County at that time. The city's population dwindled from 1,875 in 1890 to a low of 646 in 1910, but grew to 1,380 by 2010. Tombstone has frequently been noted on lists of unusual place names.

=== Founding ===
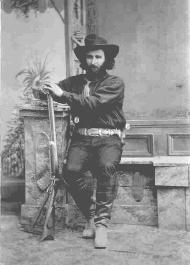
Ed Schieffelin in Tombstone in 1880

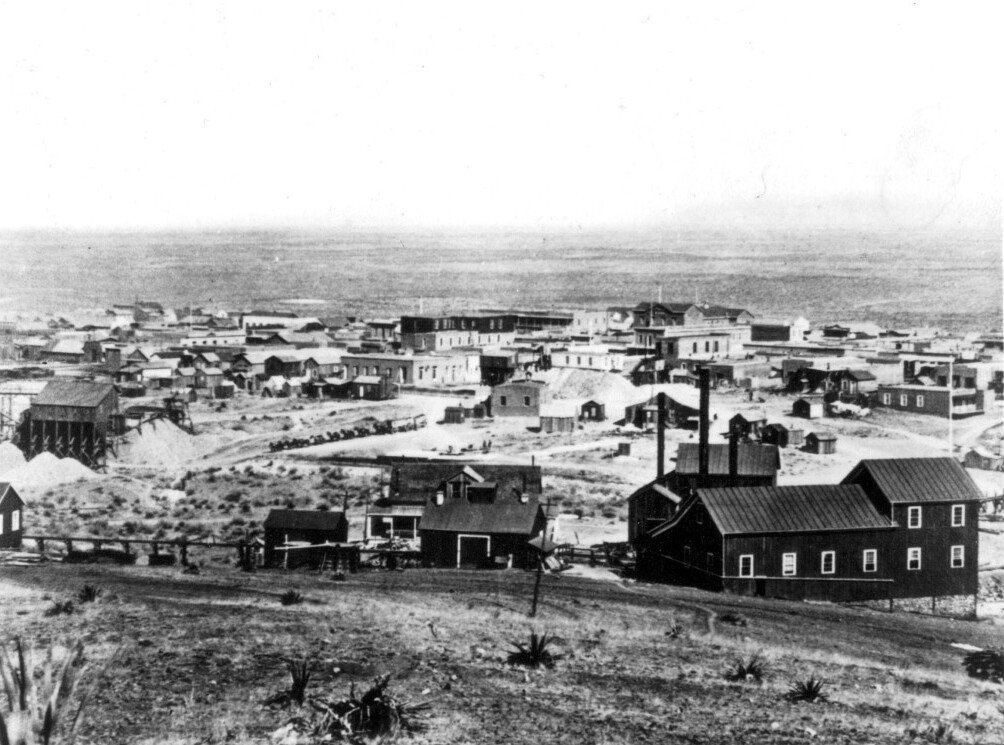
Tombstone in 1881 by C. S. Fly

Ed Schieffelin was a United States Army Indian Scout during the Apache Wars. While stationed at what would later become Fort Huachuca, he searched the surrounding area, looking for ore. Three people had recently been killed by Apache warriors at the Santa Rita mines in nearby Santa Cruz Valley. When friend and fellow Army Scout Al Sieber learned what Schieffelin was up to, he reportedly told him, "The only rock you will find out there will be your own tombstone", or, according to an earlier version of the story, "Better take your coffin with you; you will find your tombstone there, and nothing else."

In 1877, Schieffelin used Brunckow's Cabin as a base of operations to survey the area. After many months, while working the hills east of the San Pedro River, he found silver ore in a dry wash on a high plateau called Goose Flats. It took him several more months to locate the source. When he located the vein, he estimated it to be fifty feet long and twelve inches wide. Schieffelin took on a partner named William Griffith who financed the filing of the claim in return for a later claim for himself. Griffith filed Schieffelin's first claim, which was named Tombstone, on September 3, 1877. Another account says the first claim was called Graveyard "because it proved worthless and for no other reason."

When the first claims were filed, the initial settlement of tents and wooden shacks was located at Watervale, near the Lucky Cuss mine, with a population of about 100. The Goodenough Mine strike occurred shortly after. Former Territorial Governor Anson P. K. Safford offered financial backing for a share of the mining claims, and Schieffelin, his brother Al, and their partner Richard Gird formed the Tombstone Mining and Milling Company and built a stamp mill near the San Pedro River, about 8 miles (13 km) away. As the mill was being built, US Deputy Mineral Surveyor Solon M. Allis finished surveying the new town's site in March 1879. The tents and shacks near the Lucky Cuss were moved to the new town site on Goose Flats, a mesa above the Goodenough Mine at 4,539 feet (1,383 m) above sea level and large enough to hold a growing town. Lots were immediately sold on Allen Street for $5 each. The town soon had some 40 cabins and about 100 residents. At the town's founding in March 1879, it took its name from Schieffelin's initial mining claim. By late 1879, a few thousand hardy souls were living in a tent camp perched amidst the richest silver strike in the Arizona Territory.

On September 9, 1880, the richly appointed Grand Hotel was opened, adorned with fine oil paintings, thick carpets, toilet stands, elegant chandeliers, silk-covered furniture, walnut furniture, and a kitchen with hot and cold running water. The city was also host to Kelly's Wine House, featuring wine imported from Europe, cigars, a bowling alley, and many other amenities common to large cities.

On February 1, 1881, following an act by the 11th Arizona Territorial Legislature, Cochise County was created from the eastern portion of Pima County, and Tombstone was designated as the county seat. Telegraph service to the town was established that same month. On February 21, 1881, the village of Tombstone was incorporated as "The City of Tombstone, of the Territory of Arizona." In early March 1880, the Schieffelins' Tombstone Mining and Milling Company which owned the original Goodenough Mine and the nearby Tough Nut Mine (among others), was sold to investors from Philadelphia. Two months later, it was reported that the Tough Nut Mine was working a vein of silver ore 90 feet (27 m) across that assayed at $170 per ton, with some ore assaying at $22,000 a ton.

=== Early conflicts ===
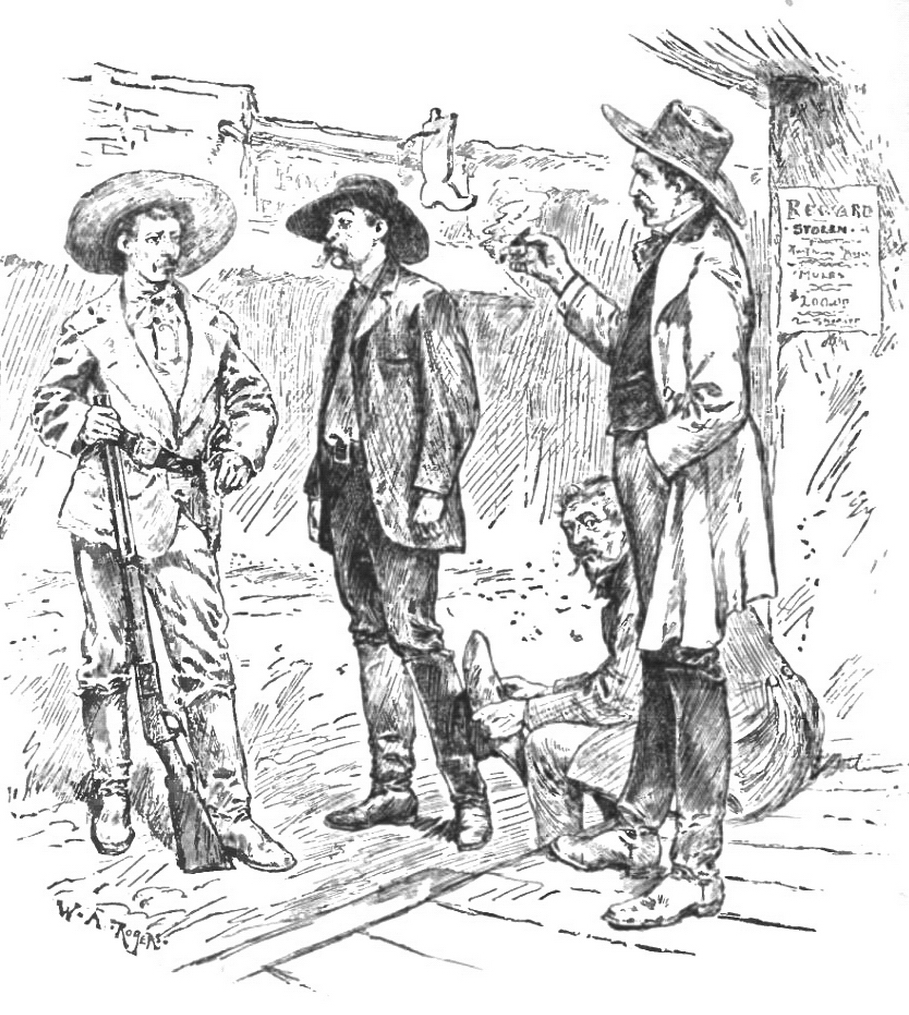
Tombstone sheriff and constituents, an illustration from the March 1884 edition of Harper's New Monthly Magazine

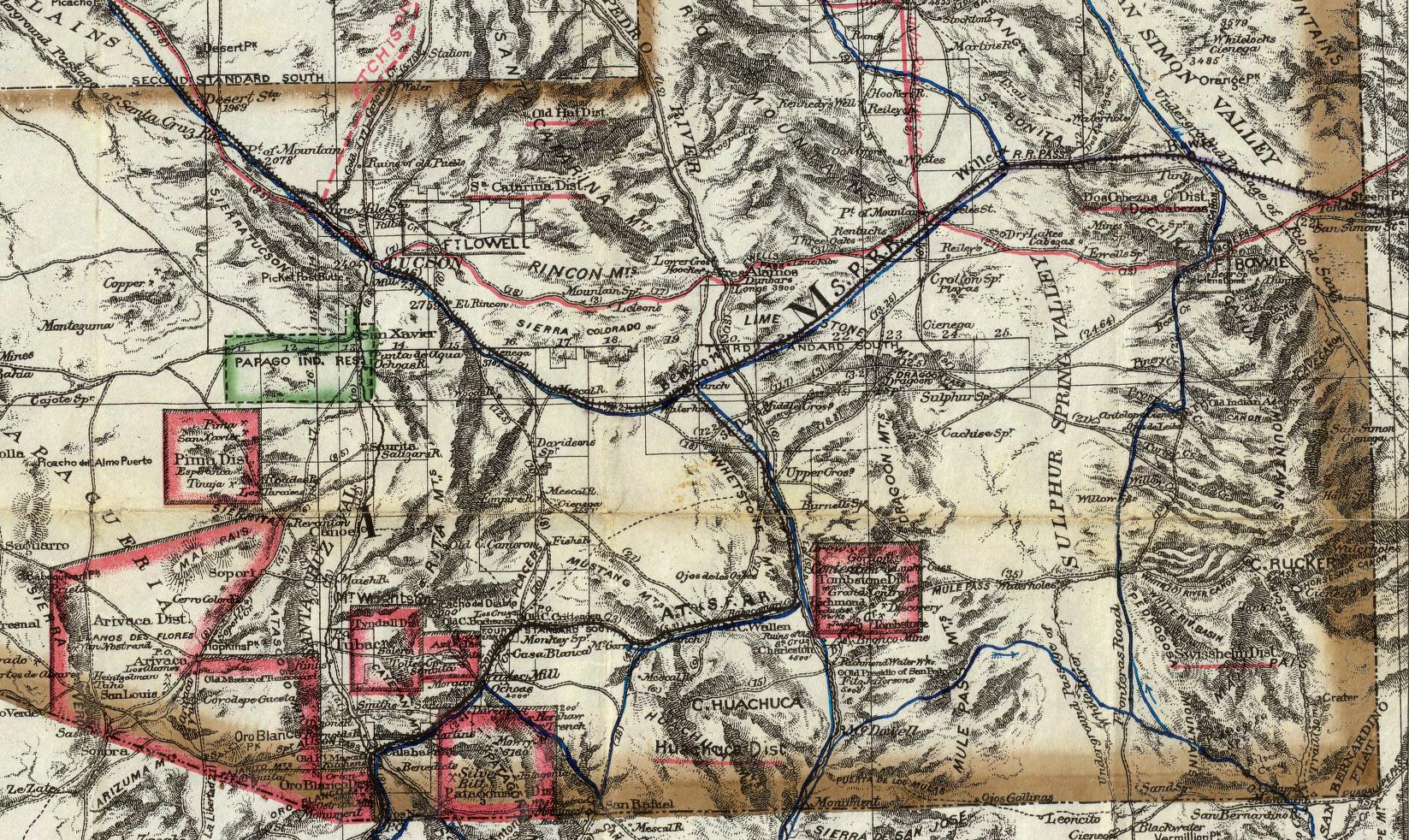
Map of southeastern Arizona Territory, including Tucson and Tombstone, in 1880

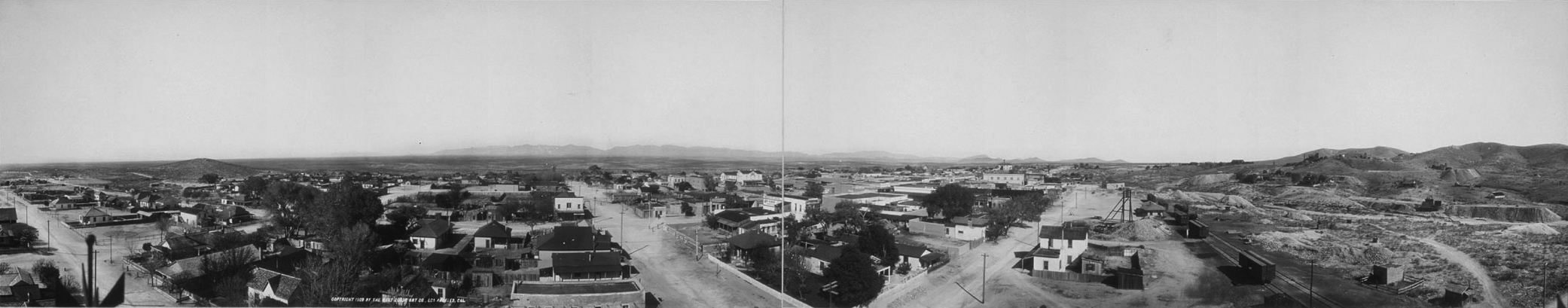
Panorama of Tombstone in 1909 from the upper floor of the Cochise County courthouse on 3rd and Tough Nut St. At the center, Third St. is to the left and Tough Nut St. is to the right.

Under the surface were other tensions aggravating the simmering distrust. Most of the Cowboys were Confederate sympathizers and Democrats from Southern states, especially Texas. The mine and business owners, miners, townspeople and city lawmen including the Earps were largely Republicans from the Northern states. There was also a conflict over resources and land, with the agrarianism of the rural Cowboys contrasted to Northern-style "big-government" development.

At that time, theft of cattle and smuggling of alcohol and tobacco across the Mexico–United States border about 30 miles (48 km) from Tombstone were common. The Mexican government taxed these items heavily and smugglers earned a handsome profit by sneaking these products across the border. The illegal cross-border smuggling contributed to the lawlessness of the region. Many of these crimes were carried out by outlaw elements labeled "Cow-boys", a loosely organized band of friends and acquaintances who teamed up for various crimes and came to each other's aid. The San Francisco Examiner wrote in an editorial, "Cowboys [are] the most reckless class of outlaws in that wild country...infinitely worse than the ordinary robber." At that time in Cochise County, it was an insult to call a legitimate cattleman a "Cowboy". Legitimate cowmen were referred to as cattle herders or ranchers. The Cowboys were nonetheless welcome in town because of their free-spending habits, but shootings were common.

=== Gunfight at the O.K. Corral ===
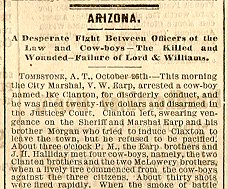
Newspaper coverage of the fight at the O.K. Corral

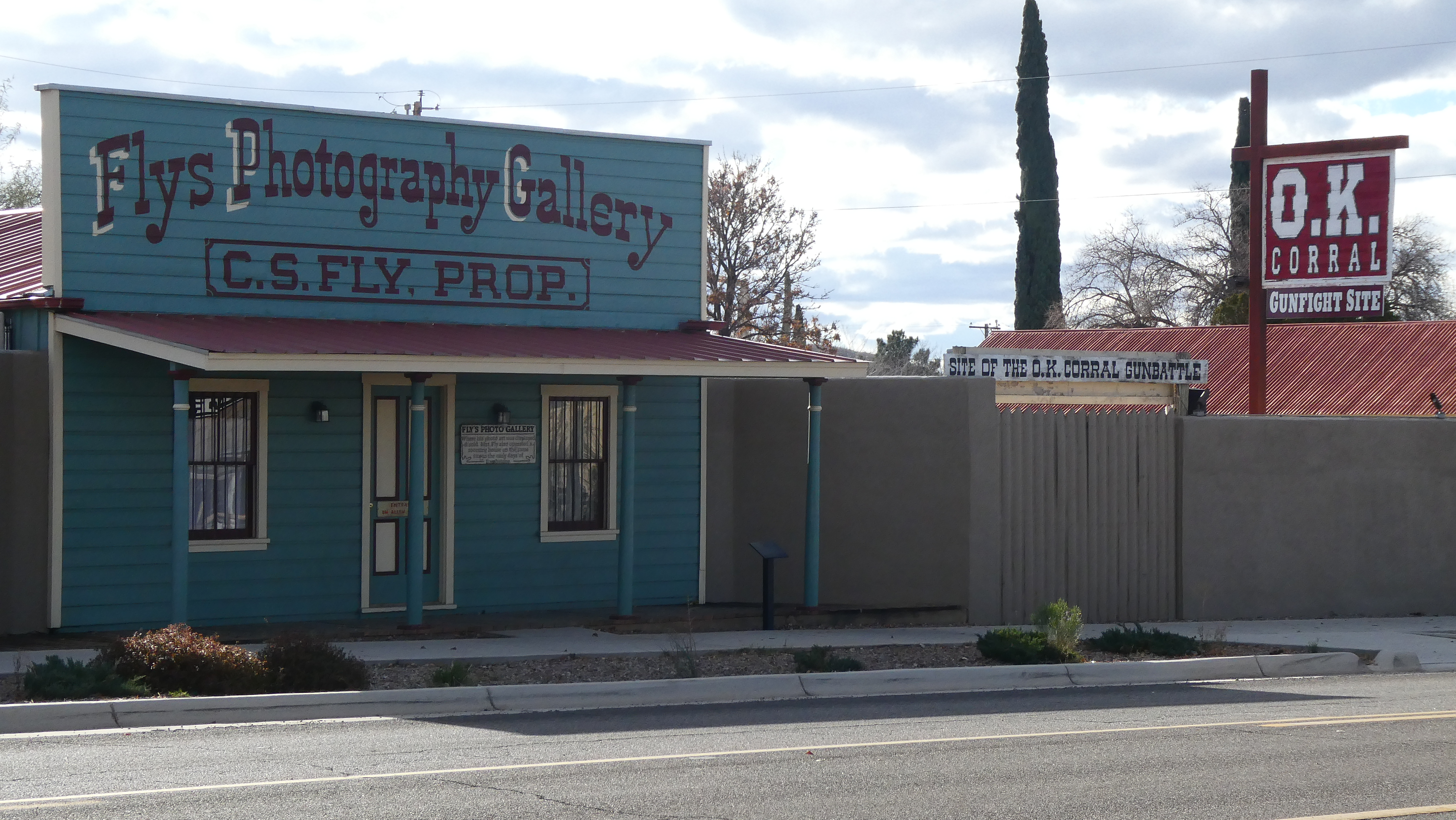
Re-construction of Fly's Studio and entrance to OK Corral

On the evening of March 15, 1881, three Cochise County Cowboys attempted to rob a Kinnear & Company stagecoach carrying $26,000 in silver bullion ($867,414 in 2025), en route from Tombstone to Benson, the nearest railroad freight terminal. They attacked the stagecoach near Drew's Station, just outside Contention City. Eli "Budd" Philpot, a popular and well-known driver, and a passenger named Peter Roerig riding in the rear dickey seat were both shot and killed. Deputy US Marshal Virgil Earp, with his temporary deputies and brothers Wyatt Earp and Morgan Earp, pursued the suspects. That set off a chain of events that culminated, on October 26, 1881, in a gunfight in a vacant lot owned by photographer C. S. Fly near the O.K. Corral, during which the lawmen and Doc Holliday killed Tom McLaury, Frank McLaury, and Billy Clanton.

Two months later, on the evening of December 28, 1881, Virgil Earp was ambushed and seriously wounded on the streets of Tombstone by hidden assailants shooting from the second story of an unfinished building. Although identified, the suspects provided witnesses who supplied alibis, and the men were not prosecuted. On March 18, 1882, while Morgan Earp was playing billiards at 10 p.m. at Campbell & Hatch in Allen Street—in the heart of Tombstone's still-current downtown—he was killed by a shot through a window that struck his spine, as Wyatt looked on. Once again, the assailants were named but escaped arrest due to legal technicalities. Wyatt Earp concluded that official justice was out of reach. Armed with warrants obtained via the U. S. Marshal's Office, he led a posse of US deputy marshals on what became known as the Earp Vendetta Ride, pursuing and killing four of the men they held responsible.

Much of the Cowboy-related crime subsided after the Earp family left Arizona in early 1882. John Horton Slaughter was elected Cochise County Sheriff in 1886 and served two terms. He hired Burt Alvord, who as a 15-year-old boy had witnessed the shootout between the Earps and Cowboys. Alford served very effectively for three years until he began to drink heavily and associate with outlaws, as had Earp-era County Sheriff Johnny Behan, a close friend and constant protector of the law-breaking Clanton family and their friends.

=== Boothill Graveyard ===
Of the number of pioneer Boot Hill cemeteries in the Old West, so named because most of those buried in them had "died with their boots on", Boothill in Tombstone is one of the best-known. Tom McLaury, Frank McLaury, and Billy Clanton, killed in the O.K. Corral shootout, are among those buried in the town's Boothill Graveyard.

=== Silver mining ===
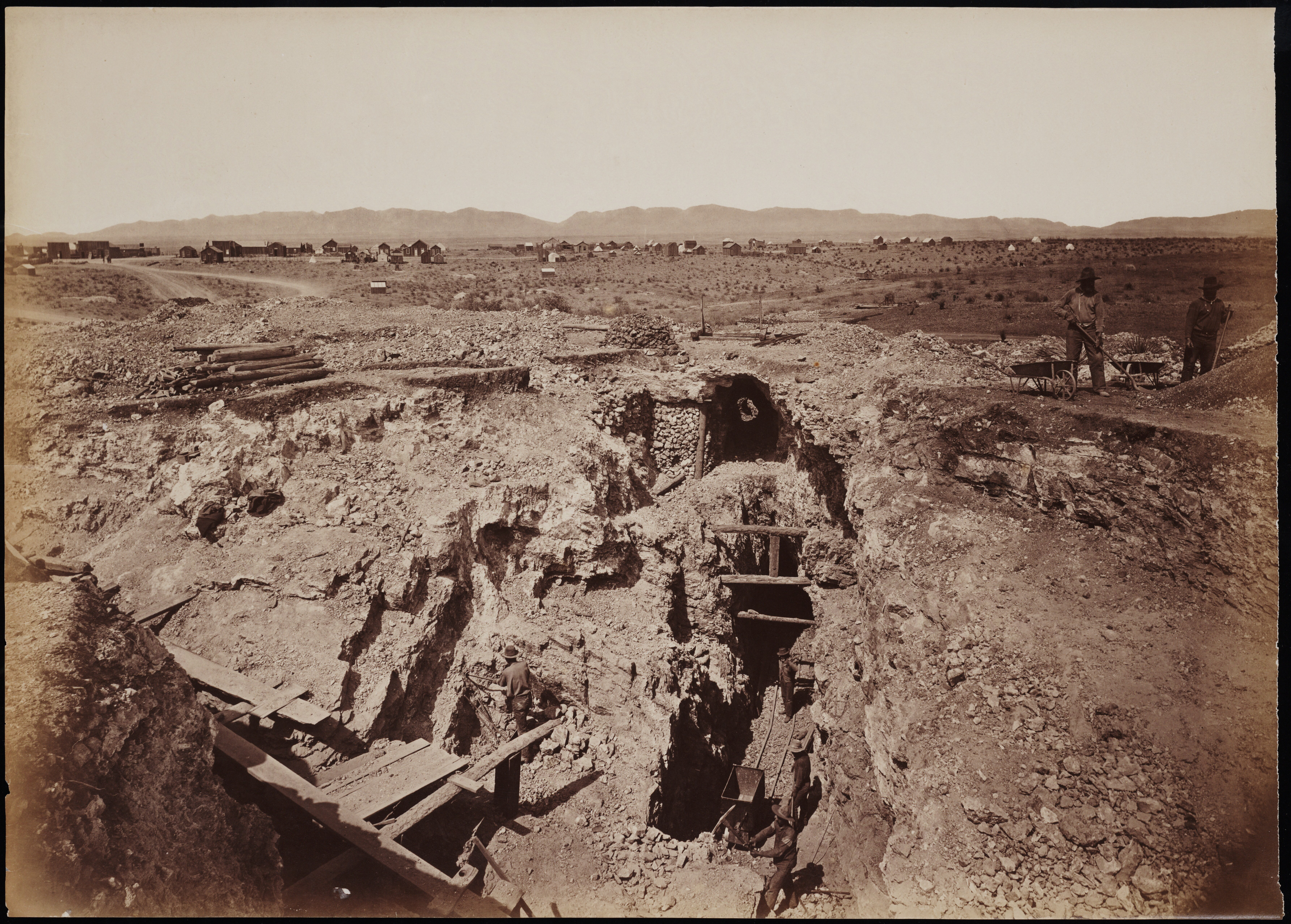
Entrance to the Tough Nut Mine

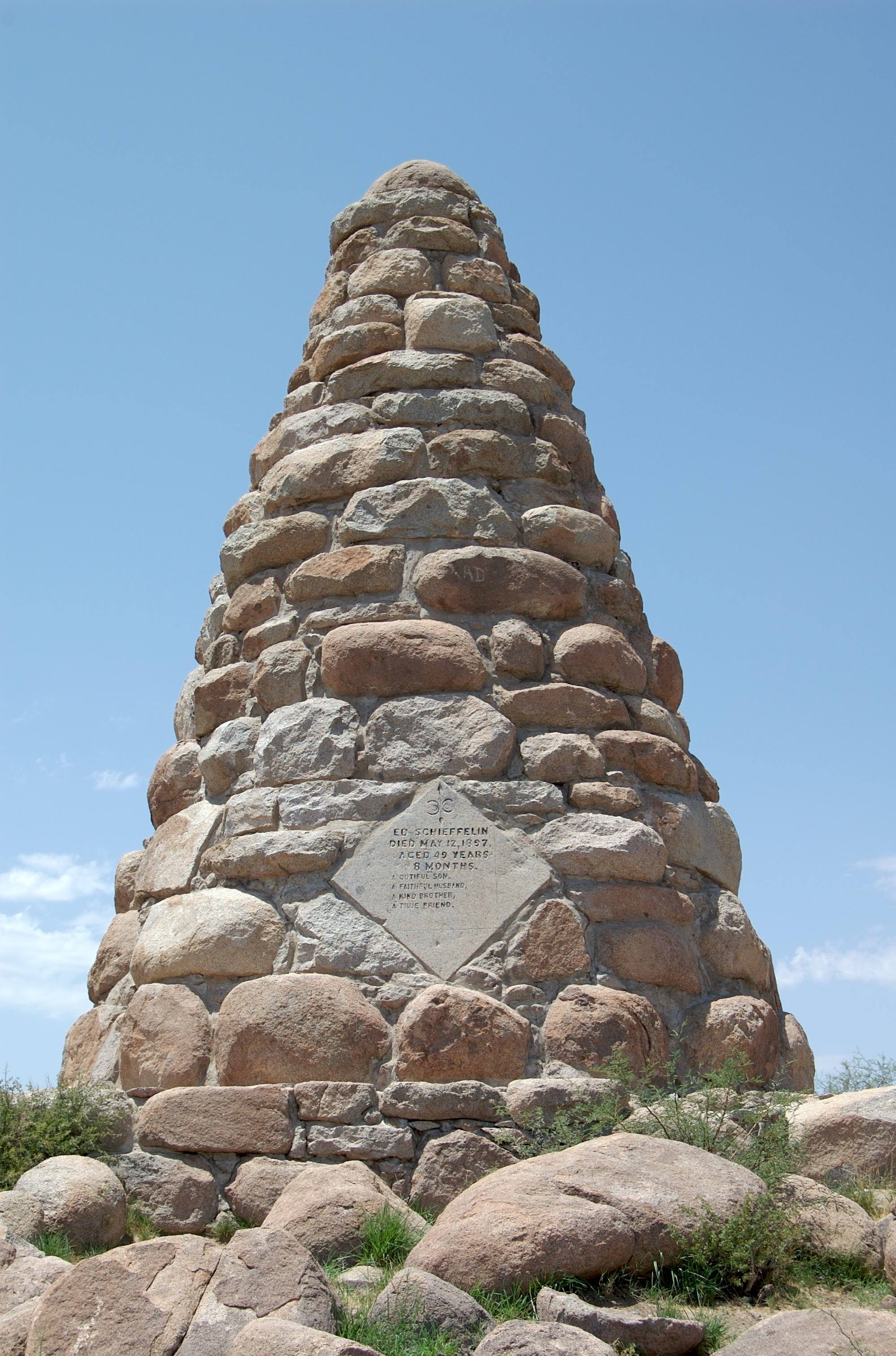
Ed Schieffelin monument

Tombstone boomed, but founder Ed Schieffelin was more interested in prospecting than owning a mine. Ed was one-third partners with his brother Al Schieffelin and Richard Gird. There were several hundred mining claims near Tombstone, although the most productive were immediately south of town. These included the Goodenough, Toughnut, Contention, Grand Central, Lucky Cuss, Emerald, and Silver Thread. Due to the lack of readily available water near town, mills were built along the San Pedro River about 9 miles (14 km) away, leading to the establishment of several small mill towns, including Charleston, Contention City, and Fairbank.

Schieffelin left Tombstone to find more ore and when he returned four months later, Gird had lined up buyers for their interest in the Contention claim, which they sold for $10,000. It would later yield millions in silver. They sold a half-interest in the Lucky Cuss, and the other half turned into a steady stream of money. Al and Ed Schieffelin later sold their two-thirds interest in the Tough Nut for $1 million, and sometime later Gird sold his one-third interest for the same amount.

There are widely varying estimates of the value of gold and silver mined during the course of Tombstone's history. The Tombstone mines produced 32 million troy ounces (1,000 metric tons) of silver, more than any other mining district in Arizona. In 1883, writer Patrick Hamilton estimated that during the first four years of activity the mines produced about US$25,000,000 (approximately $864 million today). Other estimates include US$40 to US$85 million (about $1.43 billion to $3.05 billion today). Renewed mining is planned for the area.

One of the byproducts of the vast riches being produced, lawsuits became very prevalent. Between 1880 and 1885 the courts were clogged with many cases, often about land claims and properties. As a result, lawyers began to settle in Tombstone and became even wealthier than the miners and those who financed the mining. In addition, because many of the lawsuits required expert analysis of the underground, many geologists and engineers found employment in Tombstone and settled there. In the end, a thorough mapping of the area was completed by experts which resulted in maps documenting Tombstone's mining claims better than any other mining district of the West.

Mining was an easy task at Tombstone in the early days, ore being rich and close to the surface. One man could pull out ore equal to what three men produced elsewhere. Some residents of Tombstone became quite wealthy and spent considerable money during its boom years. Tombstone's first newspaper, the Nugget, was established in the fall of 1879. The Tombstone Epitaph was founded on May 1, 1880. As the fastest growing boomtown in the American Southwest, the silver industry and attendant wealth attracted many professionals and merchants who brought their wives and families. With them came churches and ministers. They brought a Victorian sensibility and became the town's elite. Many citizens of Tombstone dressed well, and up-to-date fashion could be seen in this growing mining town. Visitors expressed their amazement at the quality and diversity of products that were readily available in the area. The men who worked the mines were largely European immigrants. The Chinese did the town's laundry and provided other services. The Cowboys ran the countryside and stole cattle from haciendas across the international border in Sonora, Mexico.

When the railroad was not built into Tombstone as had been planned, the increasingly sophisticated city of Tombstone remained relatively isolated, deep in a Federal territory that was largely an unpopulated desert and wilderness. Tombstone and its surrounding countryside also became known as one of the deadliest regions in the West. Water was hauled in until the Huachuca Water Company, funded in part by investors like Dr. George E. Goodfellow, built a 23-mile-long (37 km) pipeline from the Huachuca Mountains in 1881. No sooner was a pipeline completed than Tombstone's silver mines struck water.

=== City growth and decline ===
By mid-1881, the town had fancy restaurants, Vogan's Bowling Alley, four churches—Catholic, Episcopal, Presbyterian, and Methodist—an ice house, a school, the Schieffelin Hall opera house, two banks, three newspapers, and an ice cream parlor, alongside 110 saloons, 14 gambling halls, several Chinese restaurants, French, two Italian, numerous Mexican, several upscale "Continental" establishments, and many "home cooking" hot spots including Nellie Cashman's famous Rush House and numerous brothels all situated among and on top of a number of dirty, hardscrabble mines. The Arizona Telephone Company began installing poles and lines for the city's first telephone service on March 15, 1881.

Investors from the northeastern United States bought many of the leading mining operations. The mining itself was carried out by immigrants from Europe, chiefly Cornwall, Ireland, and Germany. Chinese and Mexican labor provided services including laundry, construction, restaurants, and hotels, but immigrant labor provoked backlash; an "Anti-Chinese League" was formed in the 1880s to boycott Chinese businesses and workers.

The mines and stamp mills ran three shifts. Miners were paid union wages of $4.00 per day working six 10-hour shifts per week. The roughly 6,000 men working in Tombstone generated more than $168,000 a week (around $5,805,000 today) in income. The mostly young, single, male population spent their hard-earned cash on Allen Street, the major commercial center, open 24 hours a day. In 1882, the Cochise County Courthouse was built at a cost around $45,000.

The respectable folks saw traveling theater shows at Schieffelin Hall, opened on June 8, 1881. On December 25, 1881, the Bird Cage Theatre opened on Allen Street, offering the miners and cowboys their kind of bawdy entertainment. One of the prime entertainments at the Bird Cage Theatre was Cornish wrestling competitions, with the results being regularly published in the UK.

In 1882, The New York Times reported that "the Bird Cage Theatre is the wildest, wickedest night spot between Basin Street and the Barbary Coast." The Bird Cage remained open 24 hours a day, 7 days a week, 365 days a year until it closed its doors in 1889. Respectable women stayed on the north side of Allen Street, while prostitutes worked in the saloons on the south side and in the southeast quarter of the town.

While some sources claim the population reached about 10,000 at its peak, official census records of the United States Department of the Interior report the population was 973 in 1880, and 1,875 in 1890.

=== Fires ===
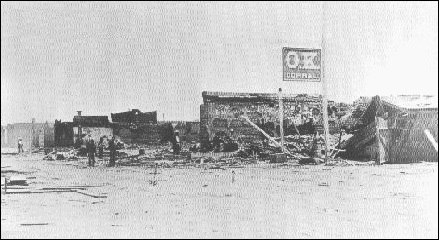
After the May 25, 1882, fire, the only remnant of the O.K. Corral was its sign. The blaze destroyed most of the western half of the business district.

Due to poor building practices and poor fire protection common to boomtown construction, Tombstone was hit by two major fires. On June 22, 1881, the first fire destroyed the 66 businesses making up the eastern half of the business district. The fire began when a lit cigar ignited a barrel of whiskey in the Arcade Saloon.

On May 25, 1882, another, more destructive fire started in a Chinese laundry on Fifth Street between Toughnut and Allen Streets. It destroyed the Grand Hotel and the Tivoli Saloon before it jumped Fremont Street, destroying more than 100 businesses and most of the business district. Lacking enough water to put out the flames, buildings in the fire's path were dynamited to deny the fire fuel. Total damages were estimated to be $700,000, far more than the estimated $250,000 insurance coverage, but rebuilding started right away, nonetheless.

In March 1883, along one short stretch of Allen Street, drinking establishments were available in two of the principal hotels, Eagle Brewery, Cancan Chop-House, French Rotisserie, Alhambra, Maison Dore, City of Paris, Brown's Saloon, Fashion Saloon, Miners' Home, Kelly's Wine-House, the Grotto, the Tivoli, and two more unnamed saloons.

=== Mines strike water ===
The Tough Nut Mine first experienced seepage in 1880. In March 1881, the Sulphuret Mine struck water at 520 feet (160 m). A year later, in March 1882, miners in a new shaft of the Grand Central Mine hit water at 620 feet (190 m). The flow was not at first large enough to stop work, but experienced miners thought the water flow would increase, and it did. Soon, constant pumping with a 4-inch (100 mm) pump was insufficient. The silver ore deposits they sought were soon under water.

Several mine managers traveled to San Francisco and met with the principal owners of the Contention Mine. They talked about options for draining the mines, and found the only system available for pumping water out of mines below 400 feet (120 m) was the Cornish engine, which had been used at the Comstock Lode in the 1870s. They bought and installed the huge Cornish engines in the Contention and Grand Central mines. By mid-February 1884, the engines were removing 576,000 US gallons (2,180,000 L; 480,000 imp gal) of water every 24 hours. The city merchants celebrated the continued success of mining and the transfer of funds to their businesses. The Contention and the Grand Central found that their pumps were draining the mining district, benefiting other mines as well, but the other companies refused to pay a proportion of the expense.

On May 26, 1886, the Grand Central hoist and pumping plant burned. The fire was so intense that the metal components of the Cornish engine melted and warped. The headworks of the main mine shaft were also destroyed. Shortly afterward, the price of silver slid to 90 cents an ounce. The mines that remained operational laid off workers. Individuals who had thought about leaving Tombstone when the mine flooding started now took action. The price of silver briefly recovered for a while and a few mines began producing again, but never at the level reached in the early 1880s.

== Tourism ==
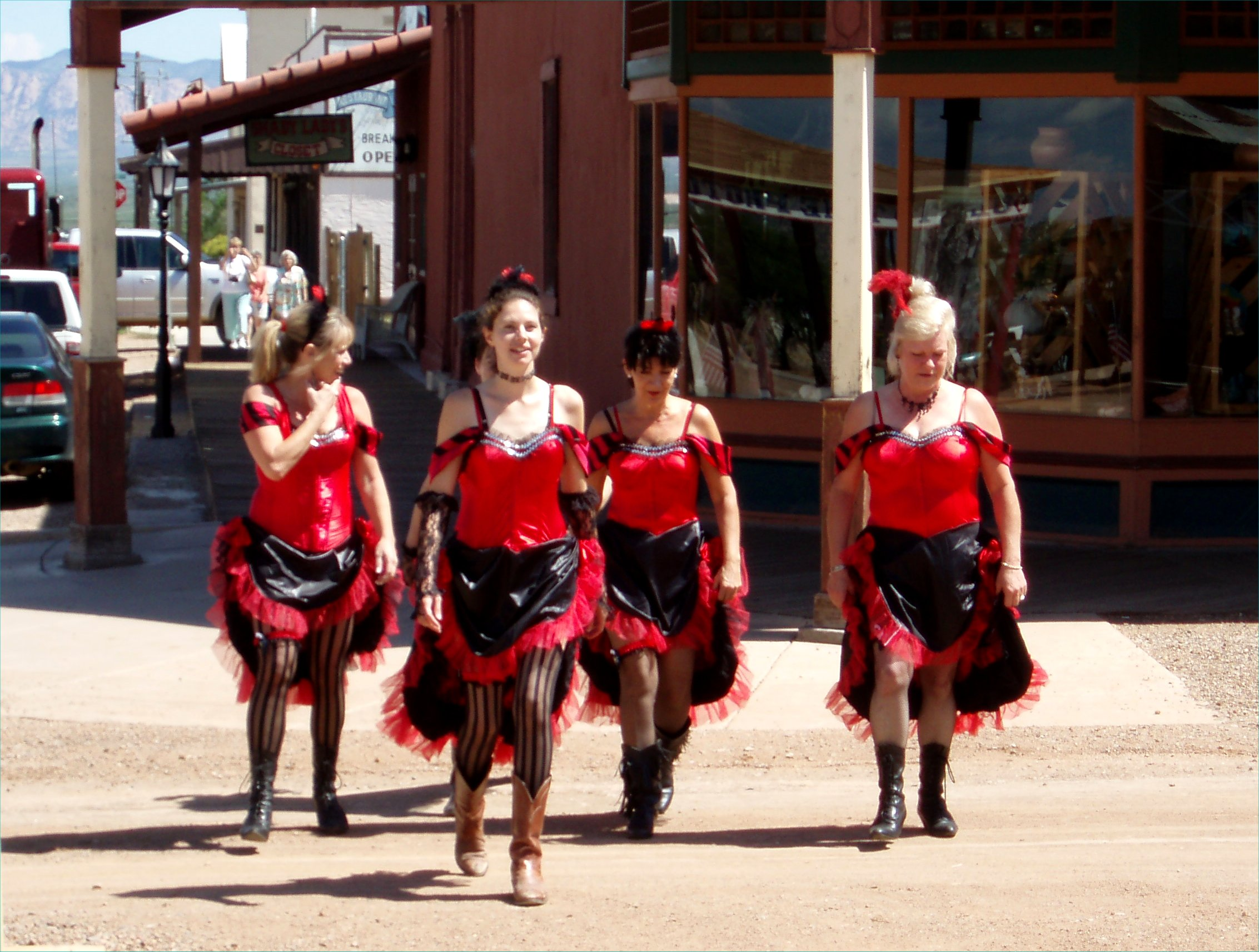
Saloon ladies on Allen Street in 2006

The U.S. census recorded fewer than 1,900 residents in 1890 and fewer than 700 residents in 1900. Tombstone was saved from becoming a ghost town partly because it remained the Cochise County seat until 1929, when county residents voted to move county offices to nearby Bisbee. The classic Cochise County Courthouse and adjacent gallows yard in Tombstone are preserved as a museum.

A covered board sidewalk was on 5th Street, just north of Allen Street, in May 1940. Jack Crabtree's Livery Stable and the San Jose Lodging House is on the left.

Town life was rather quiet in the 1930s and 1940s, but the town received renewed interest in the 1950s and 1960s due to portrayals in comics, movies, television, and film. For example, Tombstone was featured in the October 23, 1955 broadcast of NBC's Wide Wide World documentary series, which featured community historian Ethel Robertson Macia. Currently, tourism and western memorabilia are the main commercial enterprises; a July 2005 CNN article noted that Tombstone receives approximately 450,000 tourist visitors each year. This is about 300 tourists/year for each permanent resident. In contrast to its heyday, when it featured saloons open 24 hours and numerous houses of prostitution, Tombstone is now a staid community with few businesses open late. Tombstone and surrounding areas have a variety of lodging options, restaurants, and attractions. The town is located near other historic sites of interest, including Bisbee and the San Pedro Riparian area. Tombstone is a short drive away from Sierra Vista, which is considered the shopping hub of Cochise County.

East Allen Street is the center of Tombstone's tourist attractions, featuring three blocks of shaded boardwalks lined with gift shops, saloons, and eateries. Allen Street's historic district is closed to motor traffic from 3rd Street, the location of the city park and OK Corral, to 6th Street, where the Bird Cage Theatre is located. Additional sites of interest can be found throughout the city, even out on Highway 80, where Boothill Cemetery is found.

=== Performance events ===
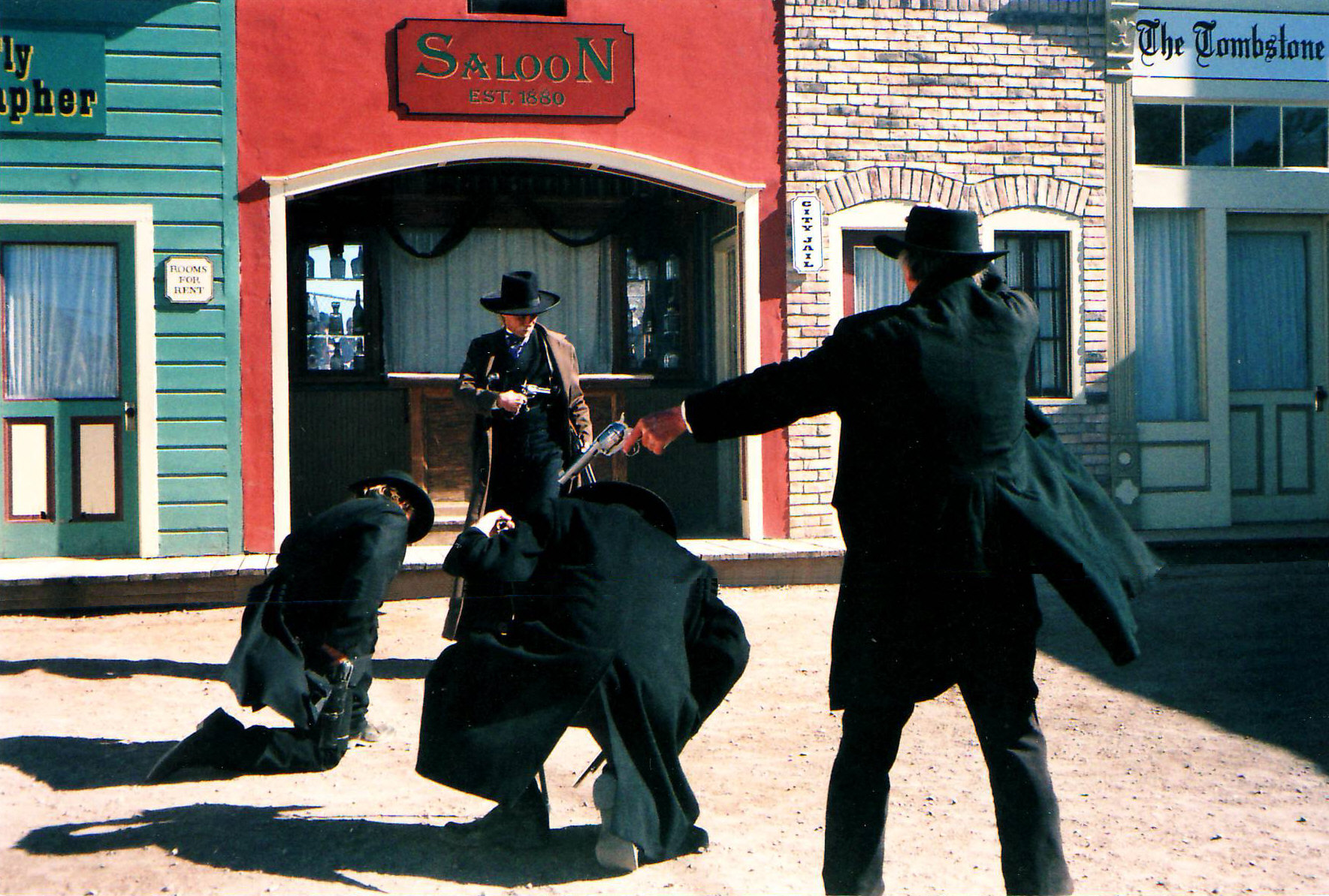
Re-enactment of the Gunfight at the O.K. Corral

Performance events help preserve the town's Wild West image and expose it to new visitors. The historic O.K. Corral has been preserved, but is now surrounded by a wall. Fremont Street (modern Arizona Highway 80), where portions of the gunfight took place, is open to the public. Mannequins are used to depict the location of the participants as recorded by Wyatt Earp. Visitors may pay to see a re-enactment of the gunfight. Helldorado Days, Tombstone's oldest festival, celebrates the community's wild days of the 1880s.

=== Conventions ===
Tombstone Redemption, a fan event celebrating the Red Dead video game series, was held in Tombstone on July 29–30, 2023, with an estimated 10,000 attendees, including fourteen cast members from the series. Tombstone was redressed to resemble the in-game Blackwater. The event moved to Deadwood, South Dakota, in 2024, and was set to return to Tombstone from October 31 to November 2, 2025 until its cancellation.

=== World's largest rosebush ===
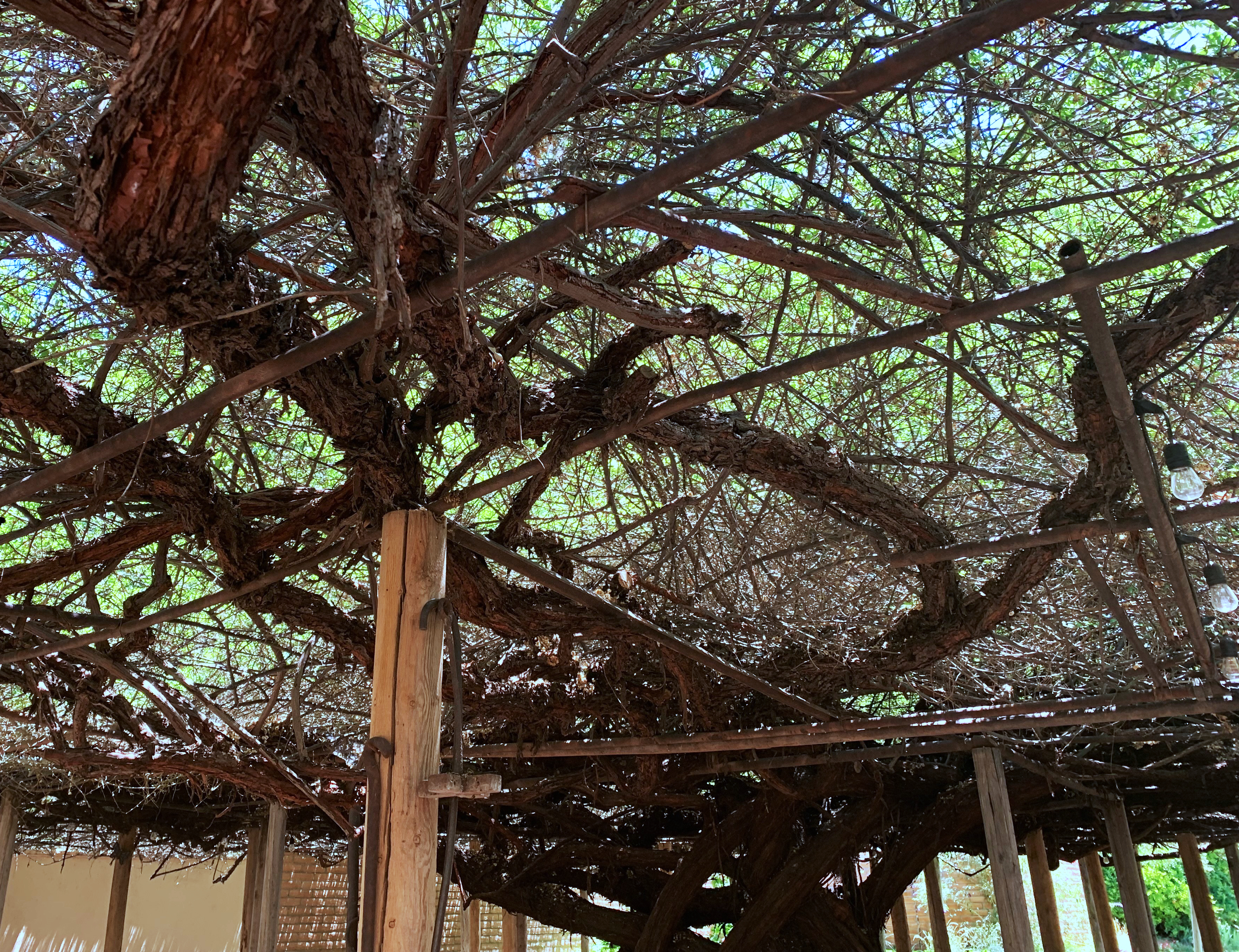
The trunk of the world's largest rosebush

According to Guinness, the world's largest rosebush was planted in Tombstone in 1885 and still flourishes in the city's sunny climate. The Lady Banksia rose originated in Scotland. Mary Gee was the wife of mining engineer Henry Gee, who worked for the Vizina Mining Co. Mary's family sent the homesick bride a box of rooted cuttings from her home country. She planted one of the roses by the patio of the Vizina Mining Company's boarding house, the first adobe building in town, located at 4th and Toughnut Streets across from the later site of the railroad depot. Henry and she lived in the boarding house when they first arrived in Tombstone.

The building was later renamed the Cochise House Hotel, and from 1909 to 1936, it was known as the Arcade Hotel. By the 1930s, the rosebush had grown to shade the entire patio and became a popular site for tourists. The hotel was renamed in 1937 by owner, Ethel Robertson Macia, first to the Rose Tree Inn and later to the Rose Tree Inn Museum. The museum curator tells visitors that all Banksia roses growing in the U.S. today are descendants of the Tombstone rose.

In 1940, the Lady Banksia rose covered about 4,000 sq ft (370 m^{2}). As of 2014, the rosebush covered more than 8,000 sq ft (740 m^{2}) of the roof and garden trellis of the inn, and has a 12 ft (3.7 m) circumference trunk. The rosebush is walled off, and the inn charges admission to view it.

A pair of huge rose "trees" of more than 5 ft (1.5 m) in circumference, also planted in the 1880s, shade a 2,500 sq ft (230 m^{2}) courtyard at Tombstone's historic Sacred Heart Church.

== Historic district ==
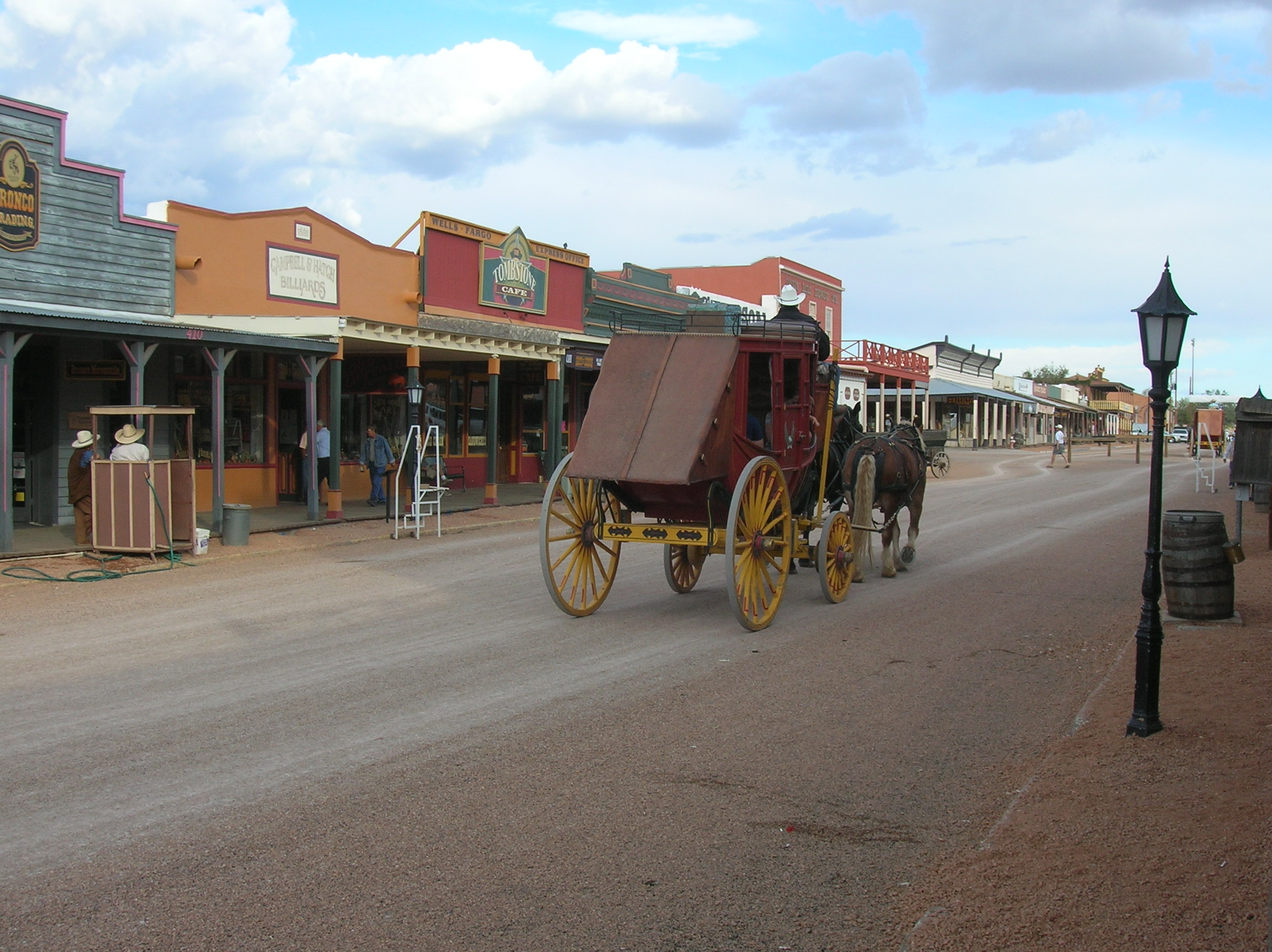
Allen Street

The Tombstone Historic District is a National Historic Landmark District. The town's focus on tourism has threatened the town's designation as a National Historic Landmark District, a designation it earned in 1961 as "one of the best preserved specimens of the rugged frontier town of the 1870s and '80s". In 2004, the National Park Service declared that Tombstone's historic designation was threatened, and asked the community to develop an appropriate stewardship program.

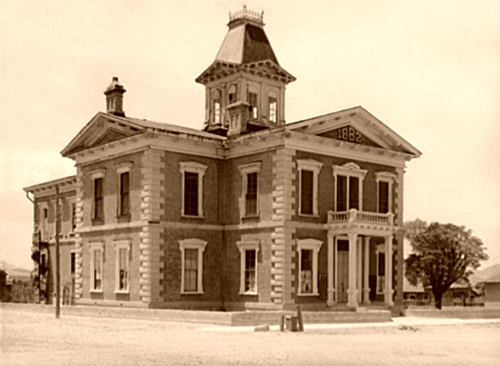
Cochise County Courthouse in Tombstone, Arizona, before it was restored. It remained vacant from 1931 through 1955, when it was redeveloped as a museum.

The National Park Service noted inappropriate alterations to the district included:

- Placing "historic" dates on new buildings
- Failing to distinguish new construction from historic structures
- Covering authentic historic elevations with inappropriate materials
- Replacing historic features instead of repairing them
- Replacing missing historic features with conjectural and unsubstantiated materials
- Building incompatible additions to existing historic structures and new incompatible buildings within the historic district
- Using illuminated signage, including blinking lights surrounding historic signs
- Installing hitching rails and Spanish tile-covered store porches when such architectural features never existed within Tombstone

Historical buildings include Schieffelin Hall, the opera house built by Al Schieffelin in 1881, and the Cochise County Courthouse. The courthouse was largely unused and then vacant after the county seat was moved to Bisbee. An attempt was made to turn it into hotel in the 1940s, and when that failed it stood empty until 1955. The Tombstone Restoration Commission acquired the courthouse and developed it as a historical museum that opened in 1959. It features exhibits and thousands of artifacts documenting Tombstone's past.

The Crystal Palace Saloon, including its 45 feet (14 m) long mahogany bar, was rebuilt based on photographs of the original saloon was restored in May 1964 to its 1881 condition. This included large Victorian ceiling lamps and the inlaid‐patterned wood floor.

== Geography and geology ==
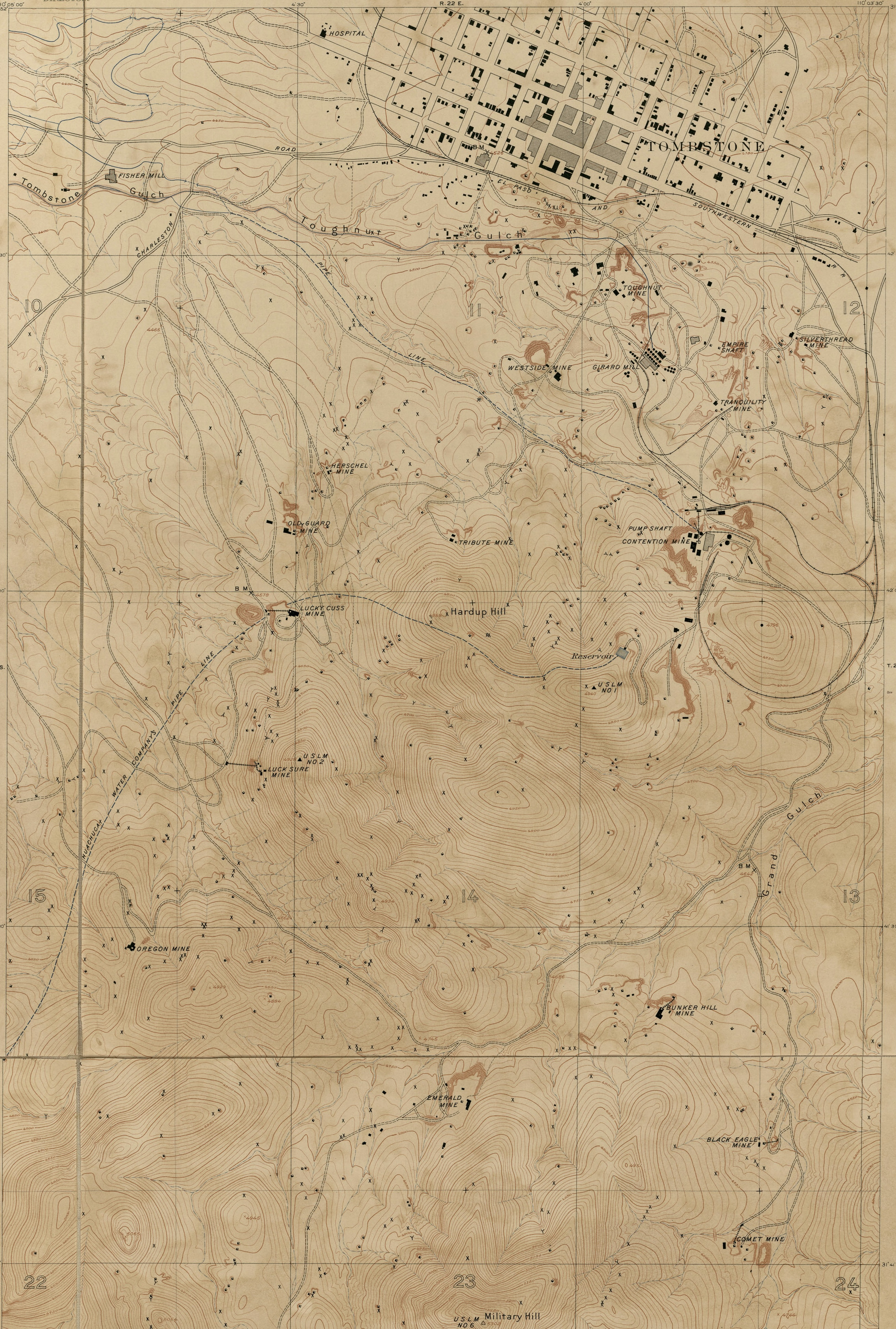
Tombstone Mining Map (USGS, 1907)

The Tombstone District located at 31°42′57″N 110°3′53″W (31.715940, −110.064827) sits atop a mesa (elevation 4,539 feet [1,383 m]) in the San Pedro River valley between the Huachuca Mountains and Whetstone Mountains to the west, and the Mules and the Dragoon Mountains to the east. According to the United States Census Bureau, the city has a total area of 4.3 square miles (11.2 km^{2}), all land.

The silver-bearing Tombstone Hills around the city are caused by a local intrusion of porphyry through a limestone capping. When actively mined, the silver vein of argentiferous galena (silver-bearing lead ore) was large and well defined. The silver and lead were easily milled and smelted. The lead content sometimes was as much as 50% of the ore, and assays proved the silver content ran as high as $105.00 per ton in 1881 dollars.

The underlying basement rocks are fine-grained Pinal schist, which is intruded by gneissic granite. The outcrop is in a small area south of the principal mines. The overlying Paleozoic quartzite and limestones rocks lie on an unconformity with a total thickness ranging from 4,000 to 5,000 ft (1,200 to 1,500 m), and contains 2,500 to 3,500 ft (760 to 1,070 m) of Mississippian Escabrosa limestone and the Naco Formation limestone of Pennsylvanian age in the upper formations.

Overlying the Naco limestone is an unconformable Mesozoic series of conglomerate, thick-bedded quartzites and shales, with two or three lenses of soft, bluish-gray limestone. Into these formations intruded large bodies of quartz monzonite and by dikes of quartz monzonite-porphyry and diorite-porphyry. Structural faulting occurs throughout the district, especially immediately south of Tombstone, where the strata are closely folded.

Tombstone District ores have been produced geologically in three or more ways. They may have been formed in argentiferous (silver-bearing) lead sulfide containing spotty amounts of copper and zinc. These deposits are usually deeply oxidized and enriched by irregular replacement bodies along mineralized fissure zones and anticlinal rolls cut by Paleozoic and Mesozoic sedimentary formations. Ore bodies are often closely associated with newer cross-cutting intrusive dikes of laramide. Ore deposits were formed by base metal mineralization occurring with oxidation found in fault and fracture zones in laramide volcanics and quartz latite porphyry intrusives. Silver ore also occurred in manganese oxides with some argentiferous deposits in lenticular or pipe-like replacement bodies along fracture and fault zones, usually in Pennsylvanian-Permian age Naco Group limestones.

== Climate ==
Tombstone has a typical Arizona semiarid climate (Köppen BSk/BSh) with three basic seasons. Winter, from October to March, features mild to warm days and chilly nights, with minima falling to under 32 °F (0 °C) on 28.4 nights, although snowfall is almost unknown, with the median being zero and the heaviest monthly fall being 14.0 inches (35.56 cm) in January 1916, of which 12.0 inches (30.48 cm) fell on January 16. The coldest temperature record in Tombstone has been 3 °F (−16.1 °C) on December 8, 1978.

The summer season from April to June is extremely dry and gradually heats up – the hottest temperature on record being 112 °F (44.4 °C) on July 4, 1989 – before the monsoon season from July to September brings the heaviest rainfall, averaging 7.71 inches (195.8 mm) out of an annual total of 13.22 in (335.8 mm). The wettest month has been July 2008, when 11.53 in (292.9 mm) fell and 15 days had at least 0.04 in (1.0 mm) of rainfall – though the record for the most such days in a month stands at 18, in July 1930. Since 1893, the wettest calendar year has been 1905, with 27.84 in (707.1 mm) and the driest was 1924, with 7.36 in (186.9 mm).

Climate data for Tombstone, Arizona, 1991–2020 normals, extremes 1893–present
Month	Jan	Feb	Mar	Apr	May	Jun	Jul	Aug	Sep	Oct	Nov	Dec	Year
Record high °F (°C)	86 (30)	96 (36)	96 (36)	99 (37)	104 (40)	110 (43)	112 (44)	106 (41)	106 (41)	100 (38)	91 (33)	84 (29)	112 (44)
Mean maximum °F (°C)	72.7 (22.6)	77.0 (25.0)	83.5 (28.6)	89.7 (32.1)	97.0 (36.1)	103.5 (39.7)	103.0 (39.4)	99.3 (37.4)	96.6 (35.9)	91.7 (33.2)	82.1 (27.8)	74.1 (23.4)	104.8 (40.4)
Mean daily maximum °F (°C)	61.6 (16.4)	64.3 (17.9)	71.3 (21.8)	78.6 (25.9)	86.9 (30.5)	96.1 (35.6)	94.0 (34.4)	91.6 (33.1)	89.0 (31.7)	81.4 (27.4)	70.3 (21.3)	61.0 (16.1)	78.8 (26.0)
Daily mean °F (°C)	49.6 (9.8)	52.2 (11.2)	57.7 (14.3)	64.0 (17.8)	72.0 (22.2)	81.0 (27.2)	81.2 (27.3)	79.4 (26.3)	76.3 (24.6)	67.9 (19.9)	57.7 (14.3)	49.4 (9.7)	65.7 (18.7)
Mean daily minimum °F (°C)	37.6 (3.1)	40.0 (4.4)	44.0 (6.7)	49.4 (9.7)	57.0 (13.9)	65.8 (18.8)	68.4 (20.2)	67.2 (19.6)	63.6 (17.6)	54.4 (12.4)	45.1 (7.3)	37.7 (3.2)	52.5 (11.4)
Mean minimum °F (°C)	24.2 (−4.3)	26.1 (−3.3)	30.1 (−1.1)	35.0 (1.7)	44.5 (6.9)	55.3 (12.9)	61.4 (16.3)	60.2 (15.7)	54.6 (12.6)	39.9 (4.4)	29.3 (−1.5)	24.3 (−4.3)	20.9 (−6.2)
Record low °F (°C)	6 (−14)	5 (−15)	12 (−11)	23 (−5)	31 (−1)	37 (3)	42 (6)	53 (12)	43 (6)	27 (−3)	18 (−8)	3 (−16)	3 (−16)
Average precipitation inches (mm)	0.82 (21)	0.70 (18)	0.71 (18)	0.21 (5.3)	0.24 (6.1)	0.64 (16)	3.03 (77)	3.07 (78)	1.61 (41)	0.64 (16)	0.62 (16)	0.93 (24)	13.22 (336.4)
Average snowfall inches (cm)	0.5 (1.3)	0.1 (0.25)	0.0 (0.0)	0.0 (0.0)	0.0 (0.0)	0.0 (0.0)	0.0 (0.0)	0.0 (0.0)	0.0 (0.0)	0.0 (0.0)	0.4 (1.0)	0.2 (0.51)	1.2 (3.06)
Average precipitation days (≥ 0.01 in)	4.1	3.9	3.0	1.3	1.3	2.9	10.2	10.8	5.7	3.1	2.5	4.3	53.1
Average snowy days (≥ 0.1 in)	0.1	0.1	0.0	0.0	0.0	0.0	0.0	0.0	0.0	0.0	0.1	0.2	0.5
Source 1: NOAA
Source 2: National Weather Service

== Demographics ==
Historical population
Census	Pop.	Note	%±
1880	3,423		—
1890	1,875		−45.2%
1900	646		−65.5%
1910	1,582		144.9%
1920	1,178		−25.5%
1930	849		−27.9%
1940	822		−3.2%
1950	910		10.7%
1960	1,283		41.0%
1970	1,241		−3.3%
1980	1,632		31.5%
1990	1,220		−25.2%
2000	1,504		23.3%
2010	1,380		−8.2%
2020	1,308		−5.2%
U.S. Decennial Census

=== Racial and ethnic composition ===
Tombstone city, Arizona – Racial composition Note: the US Census treats Hispanic/Latino as an ethnic category. This table excludes Latinos from the racial categories and assigns them to a separate category. Hispanics/Latinos may be of any race.
Race (NH = Non-Hispanic)	% 2020	% 2010	% 2000	Pop 2020	Pop 2010	Pop 2000
White alone (NH)	76.1%	76.1%	72.5%	995	1,050	1,091
Black alone (NH)	0%	0.3%	0.3%	0	4	5
American Indian alone (NH)	0.7%	0.6%	0.7%	9	8	10
Asian alone (NH)	0.2%	0.7%	0.3%	3	9	5
Pacific Islander alone (NH)	0%	0.1%	0%	0	1	0
Other race alone (NH)	0.3%	0%	0%	4	0	0
Multiracial (NH)	5.4%	1.4%	2%	70	20	30
Hispanic/Latino (any race)	17.4%	20.9%	24.1%	227	288	363

=== 2020 census ===
As of the 2020 census, Tombstone had a population of 1,308. The median age was 60.3 years. 11.3% of residents were under the age of 18 and 39.9% of residents were 65 years of age or older. For every 100 females there were 92.1 males, and for every 100 females age 18 and over there were 95.0 males age 18 and over.

0.0% of residents lived in urban areas, while 100.0% lived in rural areas.

There were 677 households in Tombstone, of which 14.0% had children under the age of 18 living in them. Of all households, 40.6% were married-couple households, 24.5% were households with a male householder and no spouse or partner present, and 28.2% were households with a female householder and no spouse or partner present. About 40.3% of all households were made up of individuals and 23.5% had someone living alone who was 65 years of age or older.

There were 812 housing units, of which 16.6% were vacant. The homeowner vacancy rate was 3.6% and the rental vacancy rate was 10.4%.

The most reported ancestries in 2020 were:

- English (17.7%)
- Mexican (15%)
- German (14.7%)
- Irish (13.5%)
- Italian (3.2%)
- Scottish (3.1%)
- French (2.6%)
- Dutch (2%)
- Norwegian (1.7%)

=== 2010 census ===
In 2010, the total population was 1,380.

=== 2000 census ===
As of the census of 2000, 1,504 people, 694 households, and 419 families resided in the city. The population density was 349.8 inhabitants per square mile (135.1/km^{2}). The 839 housing units had an average density of 195.1 per square mile (75.3/km^{2}). The racial makeup of the city was 87.4% White, 0.6% African American, 1.0% Native American, 0.3% Asian, 8.2% from other races, and 2.5% from two or more races; 24.1% of the population were Hispanic or Latino of any race.

Of the 694 households, 20.2% had children under 18 living with them, 47.6% were married couples living together, 7.9% had a female householder with no husband present, and 39.5% were not families. About 32.9% of all households were made up of individuals, and 15.3% had someone living alone who was 65 or older. The average household size was 2.17 and the average family size was 2.73.

In the city, the age distribution of the population was 19.3% under 18, 4.9% from 18 to 24, 19.9% from 25 to 44, 32.5% from 45 to 64, and 23.3% who were 65 or older. The median age was 49 years. For every 100 females, there were 94.3 males. For every 100 females 18 and over, there were 91.0 males.

The median income for a household in the city was $26,571, and for a family was $33,750. Males had a median income of $26,923 versus $18,846 for females. The per capita income for the city was $15,447. About 13.0% of families and 17.4% of the population were below the poverty line, including 22.6% of those under 18 and 13.1% of those 65 or over.

== Education ==
Tombstone Unified School District serves Tombstone. The district schools in Tombstone are Walter J. Meyer Elementary School and Tombstone High School. Tombstone is within the Cochise Technology District, which assists in the development of career and technical education programs for high-school students.

== Notable people ==
- Burt Alvord (1867–1910), lawman and outlaw
- William F. Hamilton (1893–1964), physician best known for his contributions to hemodynamics
- Lorna E. Lockwood (1903–1977), chief justice of the Arizona Supreme Court and member of the Arizona House of Representatives

== Historic properties ==
Several properties in Tombstone have been included in the National Register of Historic Places. The following are images of some of these properties:

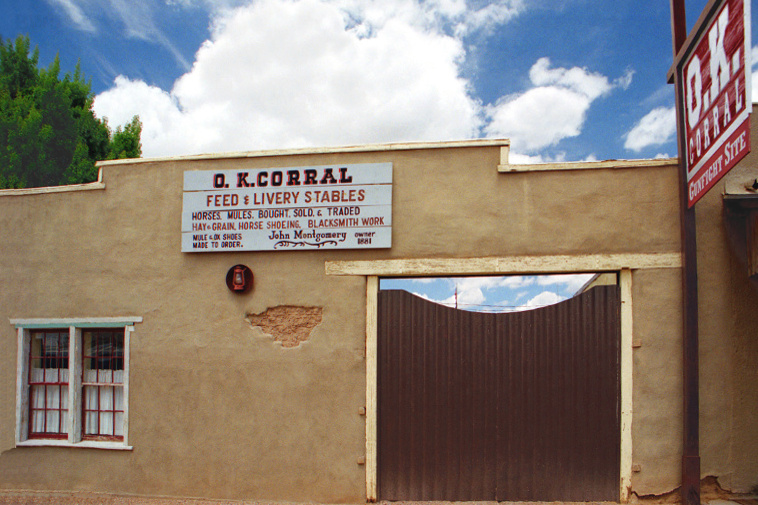
O.K. Corral frontage on Allen Street

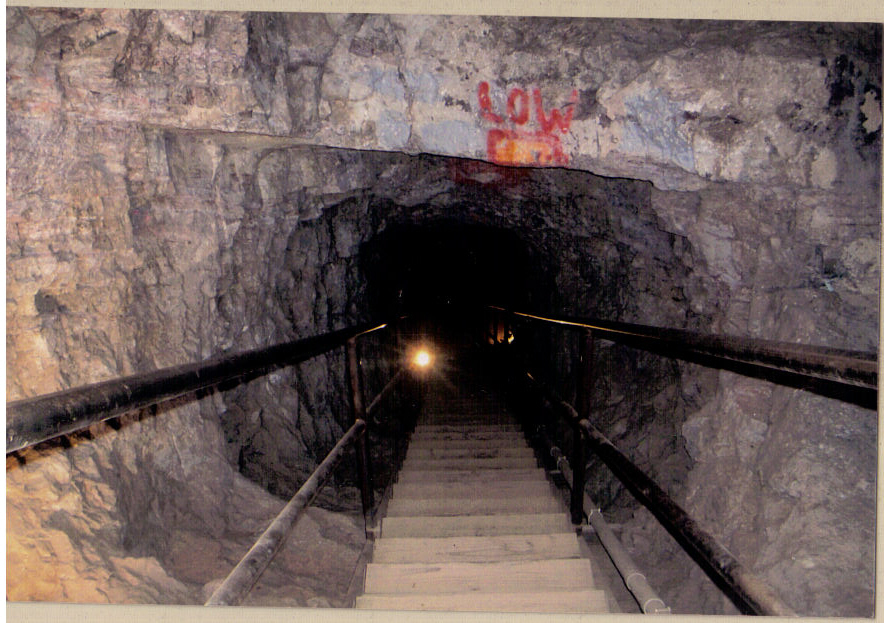
Schieffelin's Mine

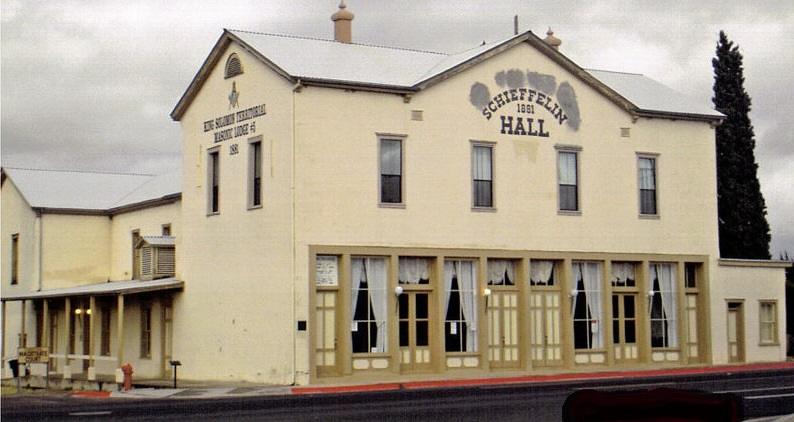
Schieffelin Hall

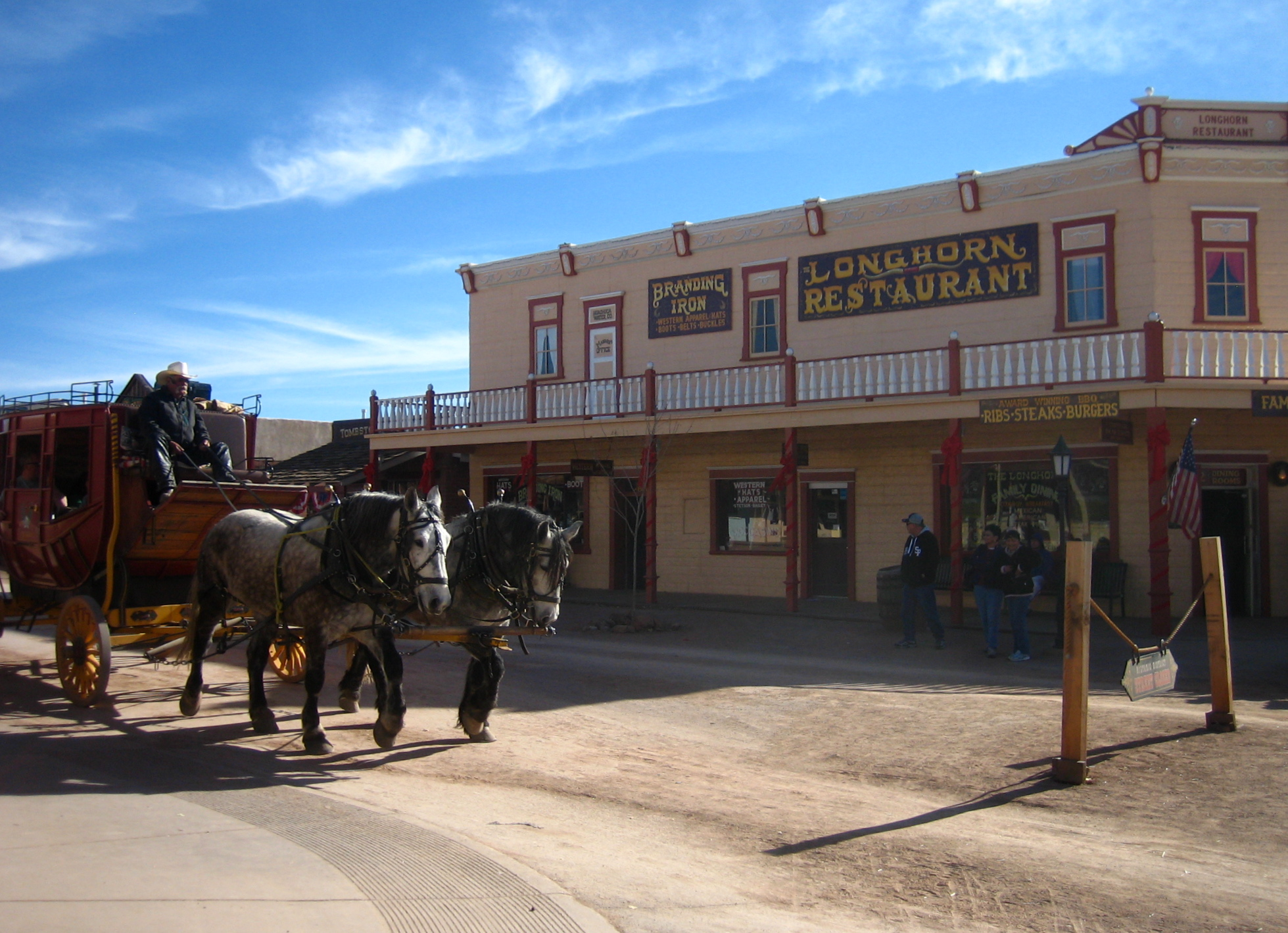
Longhorn Restaurant

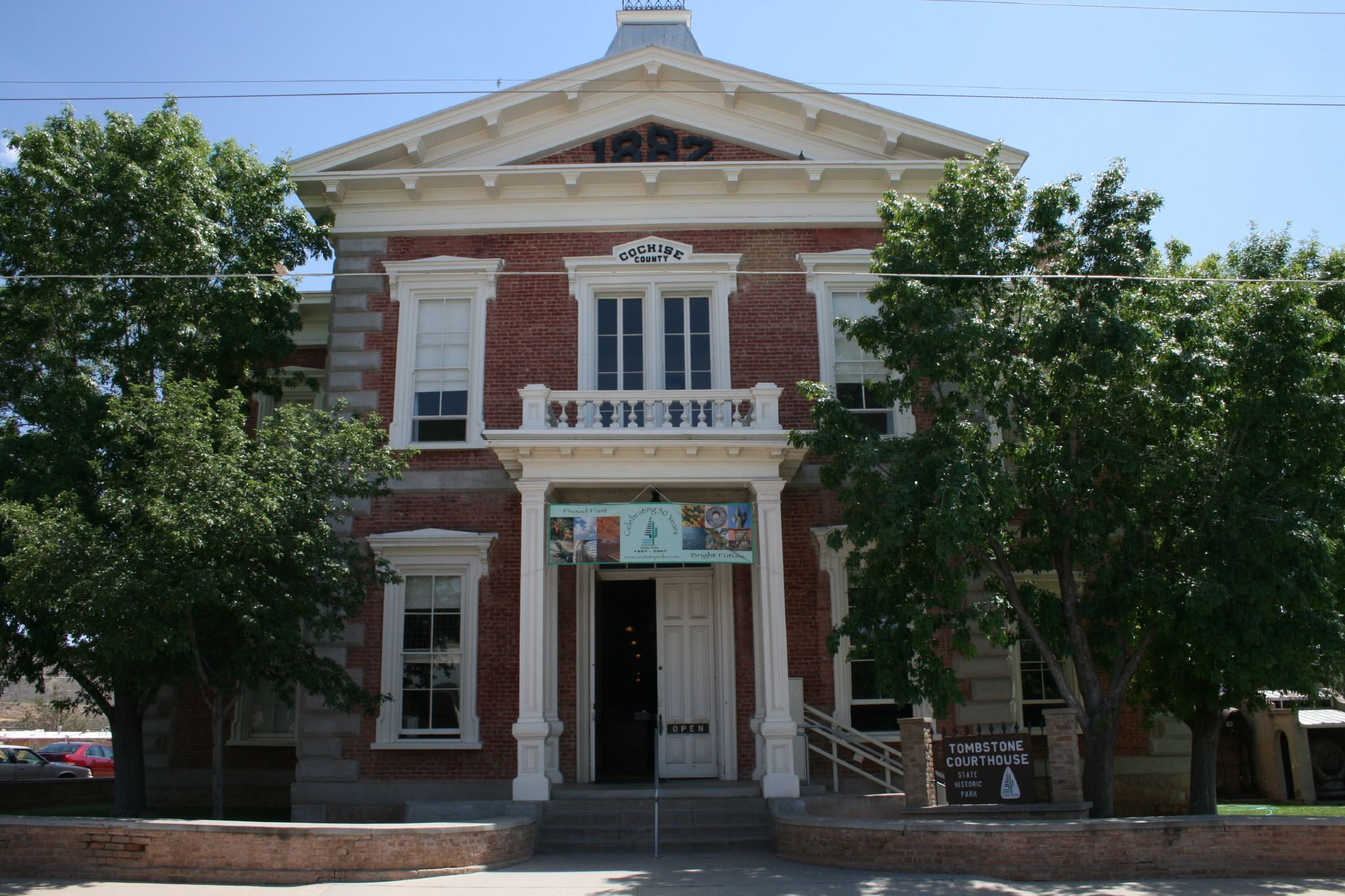
Cochise County Courthouse

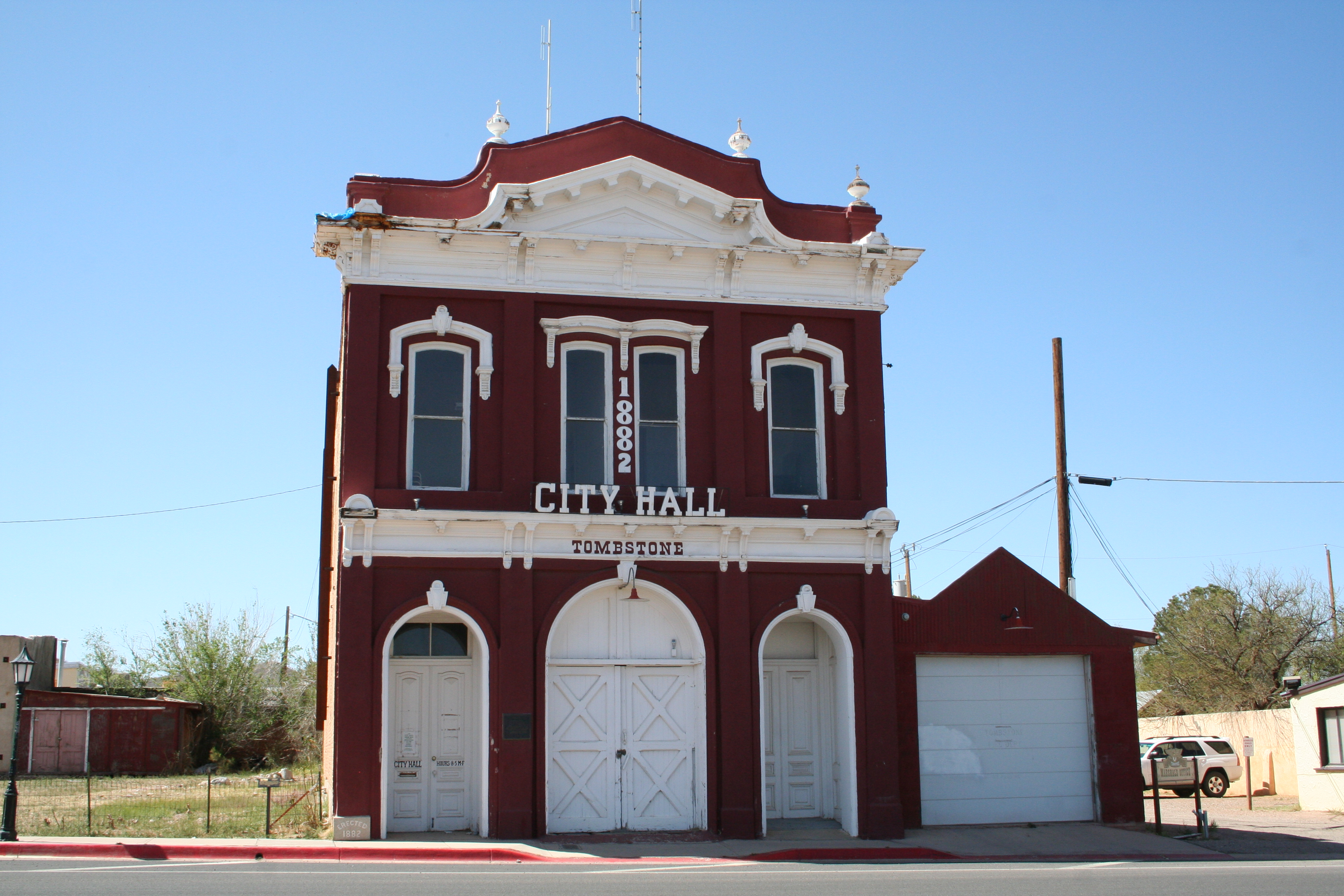
City Hall

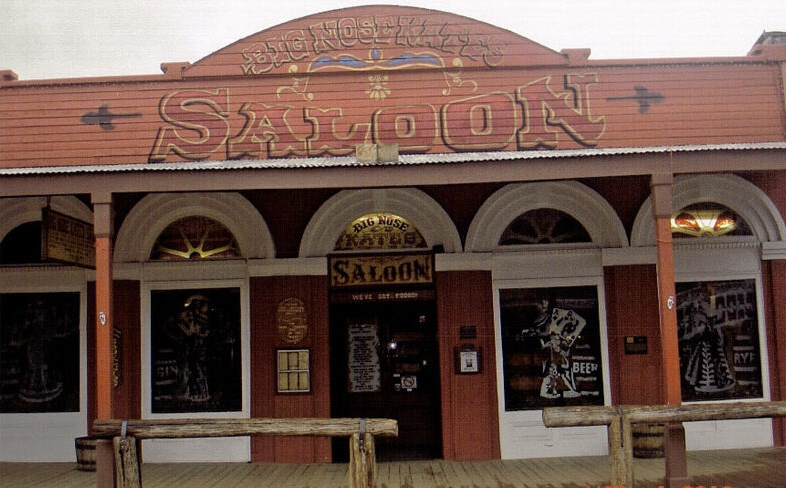
Big Nose Kate's Saloon

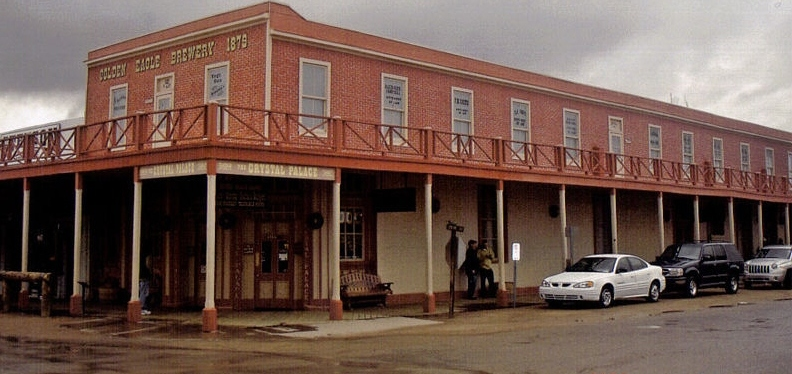
Crystal Palace

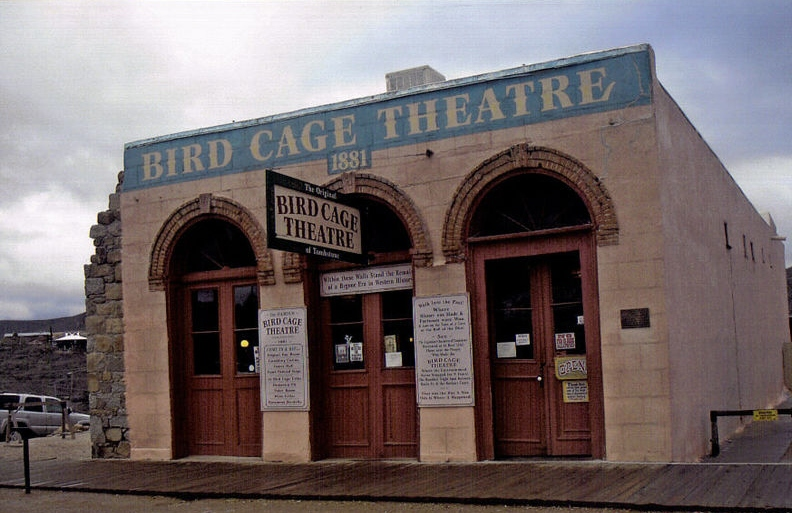
Bird Cage Theatre

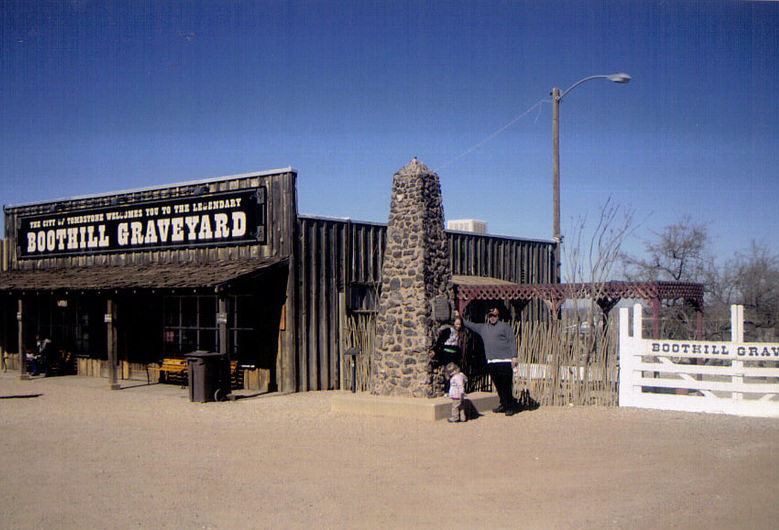
Entrance to Boothill Graveyard

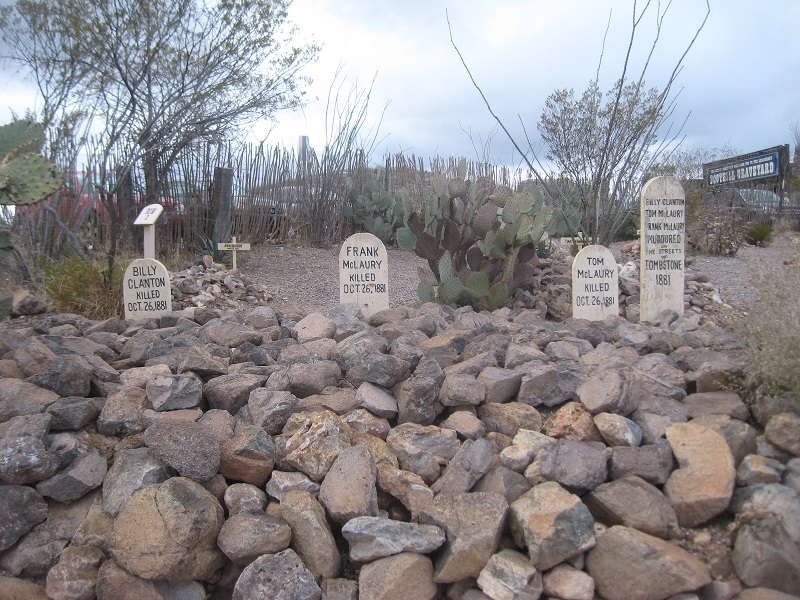
Graves of Billy Clanton, and Frank and Tom McLaury

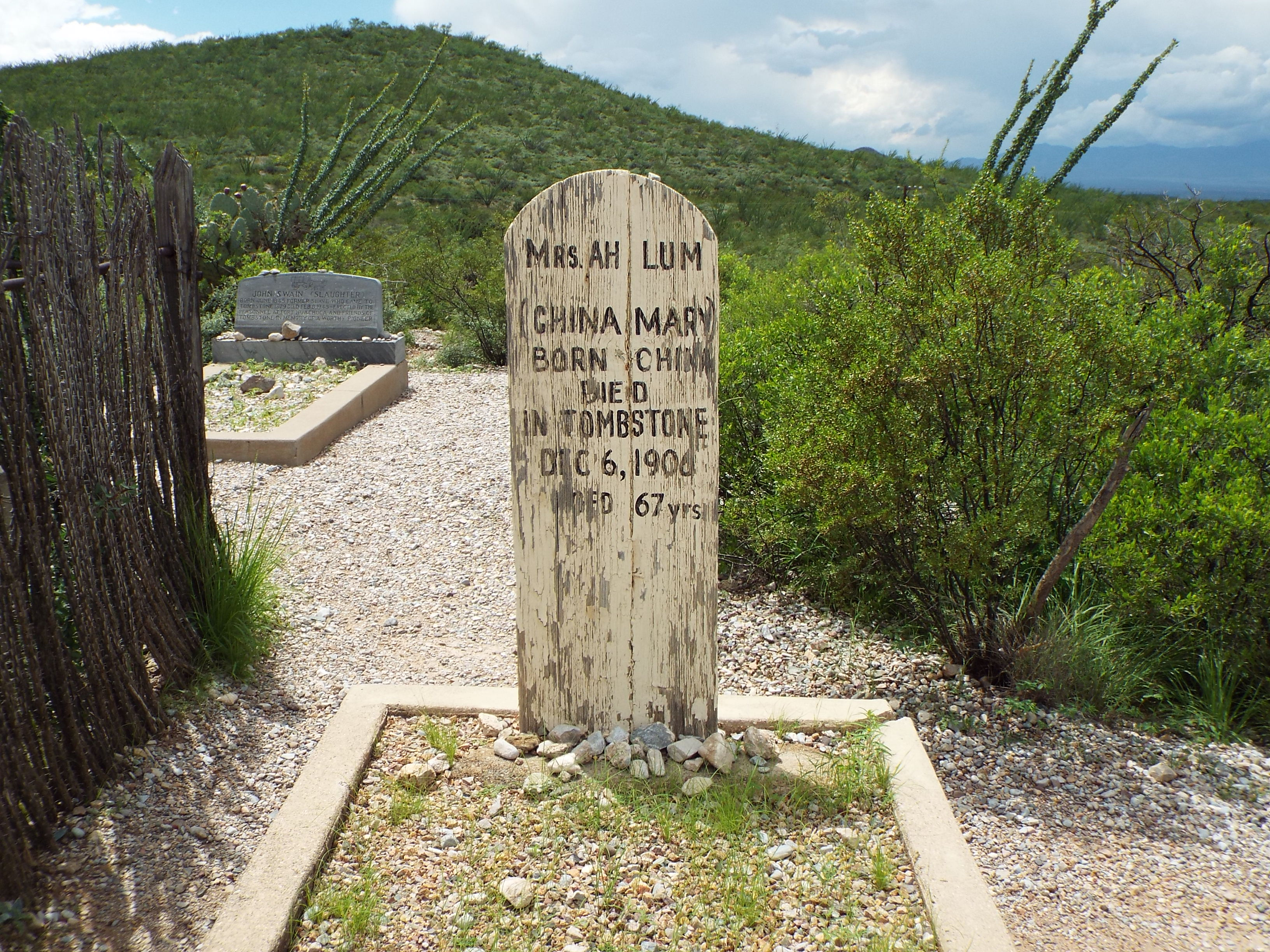
The grave of Sing Choy (China Mary) is one of the top tourist attractions in Tombstone to this day.

== "China Mary" ==
During the 1880s, Tombstone had a population of about 500 people of Chinese descent. One of the most prominent members of Tombstone's Chinese community was Sing Choy (or Ah Chum), a woman popularly nicknamed "China Mary". Her role as a community leader included operating a store, controlling opium dens and gambling, and securing jobs for Chinese laborers in the White community.

She died in December 1906 from heart failure, and was buried in Tombstone's Boot Hill Cemetery. She was portrayed in an episode of the 1955 television series The Life and Legend of Wyatt Earp by Chinese-American actress Anna May Wong.

== See also ==
- Ten Percent Ring
- Edith Alice Macia
- Ethel Robertson Macia
