= Tombstone High School =

Coordinates: 31.727627°N 110.070082°W

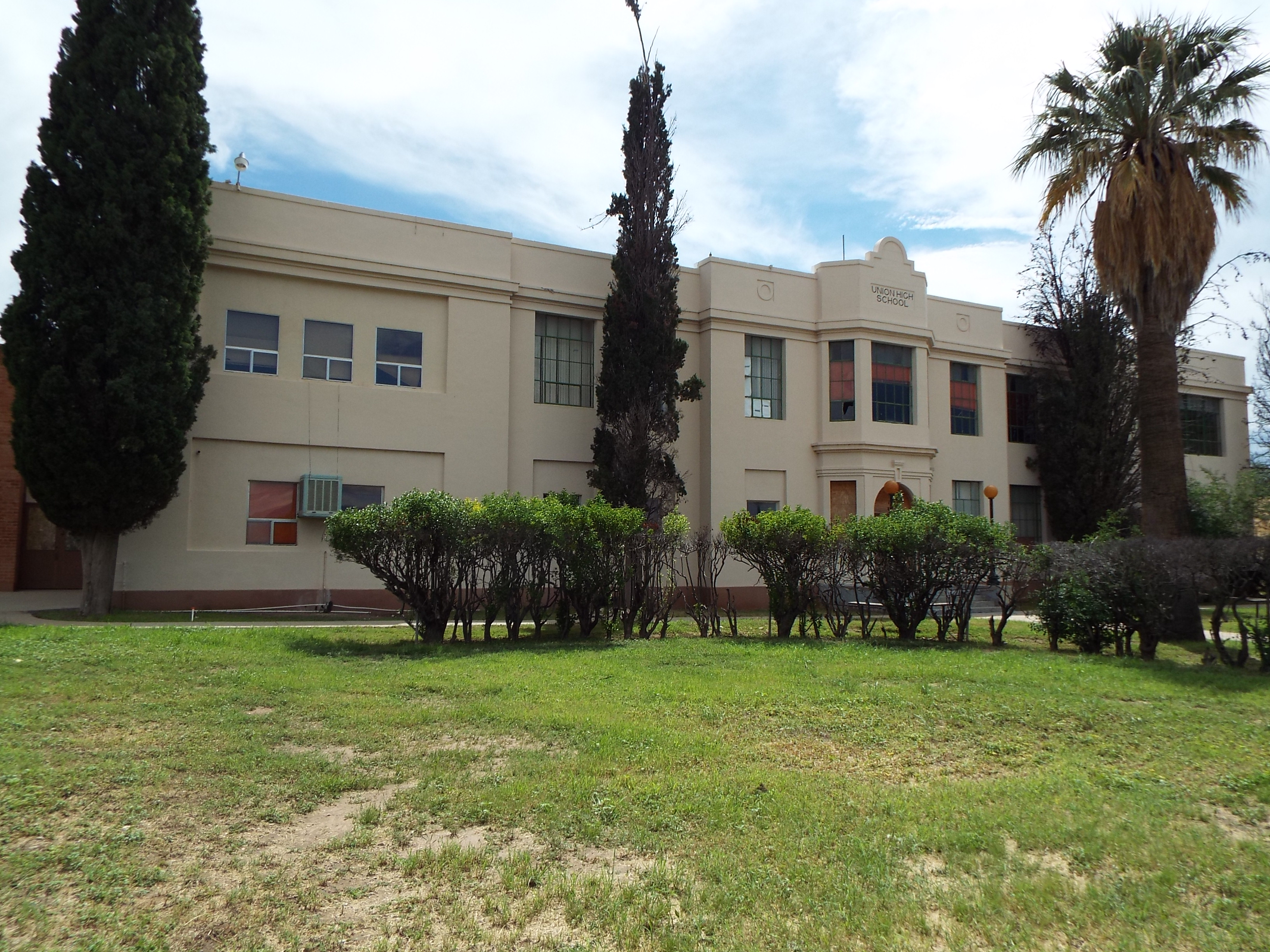
- The original Tombstone High School built in 1922.

Location
- 1211 Yellow Jacket Way; Tombstone, Arizona 85635; United States

Information
- School type: Public high school
- School district: Tombstone Unified School District
- CEEB code: 030450
- Principal: David Thursby
- Teaching staff: 28.25 (FTE)
- Grades: 9–12
- Enrollment: 453 (2023–2024)
- Student to teacher ratio: 16.04
- Colors: Black and Vegas gold
- Mascot: Yellow Jackets
- Website: ths.tombstoneschools.org

Tombstone High School is a high school in Tombstone, Arizona. It is the only high school in the Tombstone Unified School District.

Tombstone Union High School was opened in 1922 on 605 E. Fremont Street, serving students from the areas of Fairbanks, Gleeson, Huachuca City, and Tombstone. Its main building was built in 1922. In 1951, a new gym was built; a few years later, modern dressing rooms were added. A new industrial arts building was constructed in 1963. In the 1970s an addition to the gym was added housing the band room and sports activity room. 1983 saw two new science rooms on the west side of the school. In 1990, a new ramada locker facility was added on the east side. A new bus garage at the district office was also completed. A new high school cafeteria enhanced the campus, adjacent to the art room at the District Office. It began full operation the first part of 1999 and has fulfilled a long-time need. With the opening of the cafeteria came the closed campus policy.

August 2006 marked the beginning of a new year with the opening of a brand new school.

== Notable alumni ==
- Lorna E. Lockwood, Justice of the Arizona Supreme Court, and first female chief justice of a state Supreme Court in the United States.
