= Tombstone Unified School District =

School district in Arizona, United States

Address
- 411 North 9th Street Tombstone, Arizona, 85638; United States

District information
- Type: Public
- Grades: PreK–12
- Superintendent: Dr. Sarah Cox
- NCES District ID: 0408600

Students and staff
- Students: 874
- Teachers: 54.25
- Staff: 141.10
- Student–teacher ratio: 16.11

Other information
- Website: tombstoneschools.org

The Tombstone Unified School District is the school district for Tombstone, Arizona and surrounding areas. It was organized in 1922.

== Governance ==
Tombstone Unified School District uses a council-manager government. The Board of Education appoints a superintendent to carry out day-to-day operations within the school district. The current Board of Education members are Keith Guin (President), Randy Keeling, Rick Shelley, James Dotson, and Robert Gerencser. The current superintendent of the school is Dr. Sarah Cox, who recently succeeded long-time superintendent Robert Devere.

== Schools operated ==
- Huachuca City Elementary
- Walter J. Meyer Elementary
- Tombstone High School
