= Lorna E. Lockwood =

American judge (1903–1977)

Lorna Lockwood

Chief Justice of the Arizona Supreme Court
- In office 1970–1971
- Preceded by: Jesse Udall
- Succeeded by: Fred Struckmeyer
- In office 1965–1966
- Preceded by: Jesse Udall
- Succeeded by: Fred Struckmeyer

Justice of the Arizona Supreme Court
- In office January 3, 1961 – September 15, 1975
- Preceded by: Marlin Phelps
- Succeeded by: Frank Gordon

Personal details
- Born: Lorna Elizabeth Lockwood; March 24, 1903 Douglas, Arizona Territory, U.S.
- Died: September 23, 1977 (aged 74) Phoenix, Arizona, U.S.
- Party: Democratic
- Relatives: Alfred C. Lockwood (father); Abraham Lincoln (great uncle)
- Education: University of Arizona (BA, LLB)

Lorna Elizabeth Lockwood (March 24, 1903 – September 23, 1977) was an American lawyer and judge who served as justice (and at times chief justice) of the Arizona Supreme Court.

Born in what was then Arizona Territory, Lockwood was the daughter of Alfred Collins Lockwood, who later served as chief justice of the Arizona Supreme Court. Lockwood attended the University of Arizona and the University of Arizona College of Law before entering private practice and serving several terms in the Arizona House of Representatives. Lockwood spent a decade on the bench of the Arizona Superior Court in Maricopa County, the first woman to serve in that role. In 1960, Lockwood was elected to the Arizona Supreme Court. She served as chief justice from 1965 to 1966 and 1970 to 1971, becoming the first female chief justice of a state supreme court in the United States. She retired from the court in 1975 and died two years later.

== Early life and education ==
Lockwood was born on March 24, 1903, in Douglas, Arizona Territory, a mining town, to Daisy Maude Lincoln and Alfred Collins Lockwood. She was the grandniece of Abraham Lincoln.

Her father was an attorney and later chief justice of the Arizona Supreme Court. In 1913, the family moved to Tombstone and Lorna graduated from Tombstone High School in 1920.

Lockwood received her B.A. in Spanish from the University of Arizona in Tucson in 1923. There, she was a member of the first initiated class of the Chi Omega Fraternity Zeta Beta Chapter. Her father joined her in meeting with the dean of the law school, and she was permitted to attend some law courses as an undergraduate. She continued to earn her J.D. from the University of Arizona College of Law in 1925. Lockwood was the only woman in her law-school class and the second woman to ever attend the school. She was elected president of the student bar association.

== Legal and judicial career ==
Lockwood passed the Arizona State Bar. As she could not find work as a lawyer at first, she worked as a clerk and secretary for her father and then at a large firm. In 1939, she established the firm Lockwood & Savage with Loretta Savage Whitney in 1939. The two practiced together until 1942, when Lockwood began practicing with her brother-in-law, Z. Simpson Cox, and her father, who had by that time lost his campaign for reelection to the Arizona Supreme Court.

Lockwood became the president of the Democratic Women's Club. In 1929, she became a member of the Democratic State Committee executive council. In 1938, Lockwood was recruited by the Business and Professional Women's Club to run for the Arizona House of Representatives. Lockwood won election and in 1940 won reelection. In 1942, Lockwood served as assistant to U.S. Representative John R. Murdock of Arizona. In 1944, Lockwood returned to Phoenix, Arizona, to assist the war effort as district price attorney for the Office of Price Administration. In 1945, she joined her father in a private firm. In 1946, after the end of World War II, Lockwood was returned to the Arizona House of Representative and became chair of the House Judiciary Committee and a member of the House Rules Committee. In 1947, Phoenix Mayor Ray Busey appointed Lockwood to the Charter Revision Committee, an important local post. In 1949, Lockwood left private practice to become assistant attorney general for Arizona, overseeing the state welfare department.

In 1950, Lockwood was elected a judge for the Arizona Superior Court in Maricopa County, the first woman to sit on the bench in that court. She served as the county's juvenile court judge from 1954 through 1957 before returning to the general county bench for the following three years.

In 1960, Lockwood challenged an incumbent justice of the Arizona Supreme Court. Lockwood campaigned around the state, traveling by airplane piloted by Virginia Hash, a fellow attorney. Lockwood was unanimously elected as Chief Justice of the Supreme Court from 1965 to 1966 and again from 1970 to 1971. She was the first woman to become chief justice of a state supreme court.

Lockwood wrote several important opinions, a number of which expanded women's legal rights and consumer protection. She believed that her most significant opinion was the 1973 Shirley v. Superior Court, which upheld the right of a Native American who lived on a reservation to hold political office in his county.

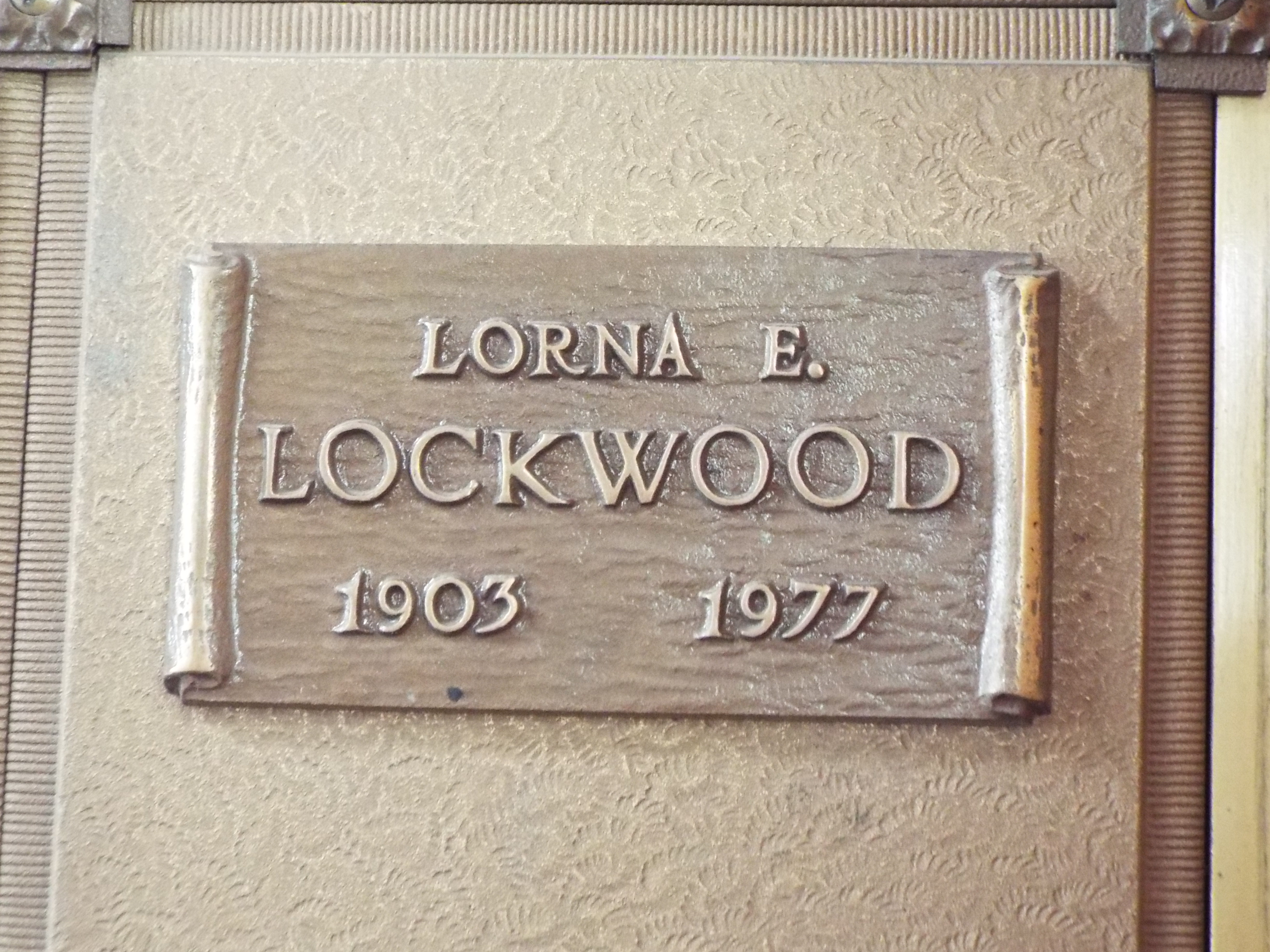
The urn of Lockwood is located at niche#113 in the South Columbarium of the Greenwood/Memory Lawn Mortuary & Cemetery

In 1965 and 1967, when vacancies occurred on the U.S. Supreme Court, Senator Carl Hayden recommended her nomination to President Lyndon B. Johnson. Lockwood would have become the first woman and the first Arizonan to serve on the Court, but she did not receive a nomination. (The first woman appointed to the Court later became then-Arizona Court of Appeals Judge Sandra Day O'Connor, who was appointed in 1981).

== Civic work ==
Lockwood held office in the National Federation of Business and Professional Women's Clubs. Lockwood founded the Arizona Big Brothers Big Sisters and Florence Crittenton's Girls Ranch.

== Death and legacy ==
Lockwood retired from the court in 1975. She died of complications of pneumonia on September 23, 1977, at Phoenix's Good Samaritan Hospital. The urn which holds her cremated remains is located in the Greenwood/Memory Lawn Mortuary & Cemetery south columbarium, niche #113.

After Lockwood's death, a group of female lawyers created the Lorna Lockwood Traveling Trophy. The trophy was a Barbie in a judge's robe with a plaque with the names of Phoenix women who joined the judiciary. When Sandra Day O'Connor joined the Supreme Court, the trophy was retired and given to Justice O'Connor.

Lockwood was posthumously inducted into the Arizona Women's Hall of Fame in 1981.

In 2012, Sonja White David published Lady Law, a biography of Lockwood. This book was an Arizona Historical Advisory Commission Centennial Legacy Project.

== See also ==
- List of female state supreme court justices

== Notes ==
Legal offices
Preceded by Marlin Phelps	Justice of the Arizona Supreme Court; 1961–1975	Succeeded by Frank Gordon
Preceded by Jesse Udall	Chief Justice of the Arizona Supreme Court; 1965–1966	Succeeded by Fred Struckmeyer
Preceded by Jesse Udall	Chief Justice of the Arizona Supreme Court; 1970–1971	Succeeded by Fred Struckmeyer
