= Myron H. McCord =

American politician, businessman, and military officer (1840–1908)

Myron H. Mccord
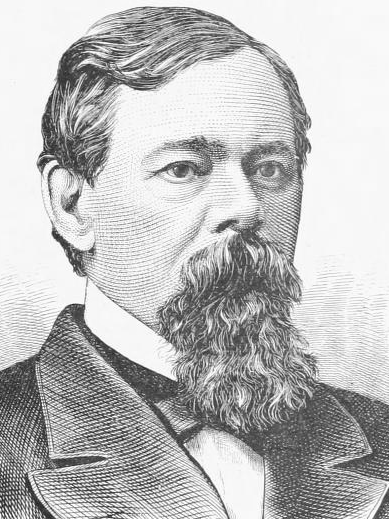

13th Governor of Arizona Territory
- In office July 29, 1897 – August 1, 1898
- Nominated by: William McKinley
- Preceded by: Benjamin Joseph Franklin
- Succeeded by: Oakes Murphy

Member of the U.S. House of Representatives from Wisconsin's 9th district
- In office March 4, 1889 – March 3, 1891
- Preceded by: Isaac Stephenson
- Succeeded by: Thomas Lynch

Member of the Wisconsin Senate
- In office 1872

Member of the Wisconsin State Assembly
- In office 1880

Personal details
- Born: November 26, 1840 Ceres Township, Pennsylvania
- Died: April 27, 1908 (aged 67) Phoenix, Arizona Territory
- Party: Republican

Myron Hawley McCord (November 26, 1840 – April 27, 1908) was an American politician, businessman, and military officer. He began his career in Wisconsin where he held a number of elected offices before representing Wisconsin's 9th district in the United States House of Representatives for a single term. After undergoing a bankruptcy, McCord moved to Arizona Territory. There he was appointed territorial governor by his friend, William McKinley. After a year in office, McCord resigned as governor to serve as an officer in the United States Volunteers.

== Wisconsin ==
Born in Ceres Township, Pennsylvania, on November 26, 1840, to Anna Elizabeth (Ackerman) and Myron H. McCord. His family moved to near Bolivar, New York, in the mid-1840s. McCord received his early education in local schools and at the nearby Richburg Academy. In 1854, he moved to Shawano, Wisconsin, with his father. There he worked for a company that operated a farm and sawmill. Over the course of the next five years he worked during the summer while attending school in the winter months.

At the age of 20, McCord began a business that built roads and bridges along with engaging in logging. In the early part of the American Civil War, he trained volunteers but never saw combat. McCord was elected Superintendent of Schools for Shawano County, Wisconsin, in 1864. He served one term and did not seek reelection. From 1868 till 1874, McCord was co-publisher for the Shawano County Journal. He was elected treasurer for Shawano County in 1869 and 1871. In 1872, McCord was elected to the first of two terms in the Wisconsin State Senate.

McCord married Anna Mariah Murray in December 1861. Anna was the daughter of Julius Murray and granddaughter of Elias Murray, the latter having been assigned to Wisconsin as the Northern Superintendent of Indian Affairs. Among his assignments, Elias Murray oversaw the relocation of the Menominee Indians from their home on Lake Poygan to their present reservation near Shawano. Shortly thereafter Elias sent for his family and they settled in Shawano, where they were prominent in early county government. Anna and Myron had four children: Charles J., Florence, Mary, and Prudence. In 1876, McCord obtained a divorce from Utah Territory while traveling on business and informed his wife upon his return to Wisconsin. McCord's second marriage came on August 27, 1877, when he wed Sarah Etta Space. He moved to Merrill, Wisconsin, after his second marriage and the union produced no children.

In Merrill, McCord became publisher of the Lincoln County Advocate. His other business interests included partial ownership of bank and a firm that manufactured wood products such as doors, blinds, and window sashes. As part of his wood products manufacturing, McCord owned lumber camps. The unincorporated town of McCord was named by the Soo Line Railroad who developed a whistle stop to serve his camps in the Somo River pine region.

McCord was elected to the Wisconsin State Assembly in 1880. He was a candidate for Assembly Speaker during his term but withdrew his name to preserve unity among his party. As a delegate to 1884 Republican National Convention, McCord supported James G. Blaine He was later appointed Register of the United States Land Office in Wausau, Wisconsin.

Election to the United States House of Representatives came in 1888 when he won the race to represent Wisconsin's 9th congressional district. His service in the Congress was largely undistinguished but the friends he made there were influential to his future career. Chief among his new friends was William McKinley who was assigned to the seat next to McCord. Attempts by McCord to win reelection in 1890 and 1892 were unsuccessful. During this time period, McCord experienced a serious financial set back that resulted in him declaring bankruptcy.

== Arizona Territory ==
McCord moved to Phoenix, Arizona Territory in 1893. There he rebuilt his finances with interests in fruit orchards, farming, cattle ranching, and a half interest in the Arizona Gazette. McCord also became an advocate for bringing in good quality cattle breeds to improve the profitability of Arizona livestock activities.

Governor Louis C. Hughes appointed McCord to the Territorial Board of Control in 1895. The board oversaw operations at Territorial insane asylum, reform school, and prison while McCord served as both citizen board member and purchasing agent. During his time on the board, several questionable decisions were made. The most significant was the board's approval of a contract with Eugene S. Ives' State of Arizona Improvement Company for construction of a 13-mile (21 km) irrigation canal near Yuma. Terms of the contract called for convict labor to be provided from Yuma Territorial Prison at the rate of US$0.70/man/day, with the territory covering all transportation, guard, and maintenance costs. Payment in turn was to be made in the form of water from the canal. Many in the territory were angered by the terms of the contract, and Governor Benjamin Joseph Franklin refused to honor it when he came into office. Another action was McCord's approval of $630 to purchase a 10-acre (4.0 ha) tract of land for the insane asylum despite the land only being worth $380 at the time. His time on the board ended on June 3, 1896, when he was replaced by Governor Franklin.

In 1896, McCord served as Maricopa County Republican Chairman. This led to his becoming a delegate to the 1896 Republican National Convention where he was a William McKinley supporter. The day that McKinley was inaugurated President of the United States, McCord wrote to his old friend requesting appointment as Governor of Arizona Territory. President McKinley forwarded his nomination to the United States Senate on May 19, 1897. Supporters of McCord's appointment included Albert C. Baker, Lewis Wolfley, Webster Street, and Joseph Kibbey. Additionally, both the Livestock Board of Arizona and the Arizona Agricultural Association endorsed McCord to become governor. Opposition to the nomination was quite vocal however. Buckey O'Neill claimed the McCord had personally profited from his actions as a member of the Board of Control. John Frank Wilson meanwhile went to Washington, D.C., to lobby against the nomination. Attacks on McCord escalated to the point that he filed a libel suit against a newspaper in New York City. Despite the opposition, McCord was confirmed by a vote of 29 to 18.

On July 21, 1897, U.S. Supreme Court Assistance Justice John Marshall Harlan administered the oath of office to McCord in Washington D. C. The next day, Governor Franklin received a telegram informing him that McCord had been qualified and directing him to turn over all records to Territorial Secretary Charles H Akers. This created minor controversy over who was the legal Governor of Arizona Territory as McCord had not taken his oath of office within the territory. The issue was resolved on July 29, 1897, when Arizona Territorial Supreme Court Chief Justice Hiram Truesdale administered the oath of office to the new governor in Phoenix.

McCord's first few months in office were dominated with making appointments to territorial offices, touring territorial facilities, and attending meetings of territorial boards. During this time, he decided to honor the contract with the State of Arizona Improvement Company for construction of the Yuma irrigation canal after the company agreed to show good faith by providing several thousand dollars' worth of equipment for the canal. Prisoners were generally eager to work on the project as they were credited with 4 days or prison time for each 3 days worked. In the end the company was unable to raise the funds needed to meet its obligations, leaving the territory with $7,500 in noncollectable "water rights" against $13,741 in expenses while recapturing only 7 of the 11 prisoners who escaped while working on the canal.

No meeting of the territorial legislature occurred during McCord's time in office. He did however submit an annual report on September 30, 1897. The report highlighted the Arizona's need for irrigation and listed several potential dam sites. McCord also suggested the Federal government should assist in effort to build the needed infrastructure. The economic section of report listed all the territory's mines and gave information on agricultural and cattle ranching industries. In addition to the sugar beets being grown near Yuma, McCord suggested tobacco and peanuts as potential new crops. In reference to Arizona's statehood effort, McCord wrote "While our population is not so numerous as some might think it should be to entitle us to be intrusted with self-government, yet we claim and insist that what we make up in quality what we lack in quantity". McCord also used the report to recommend construction of a permanent territorial capital building to provide a safe location for governmental record storage.

== Spanish–American War ==
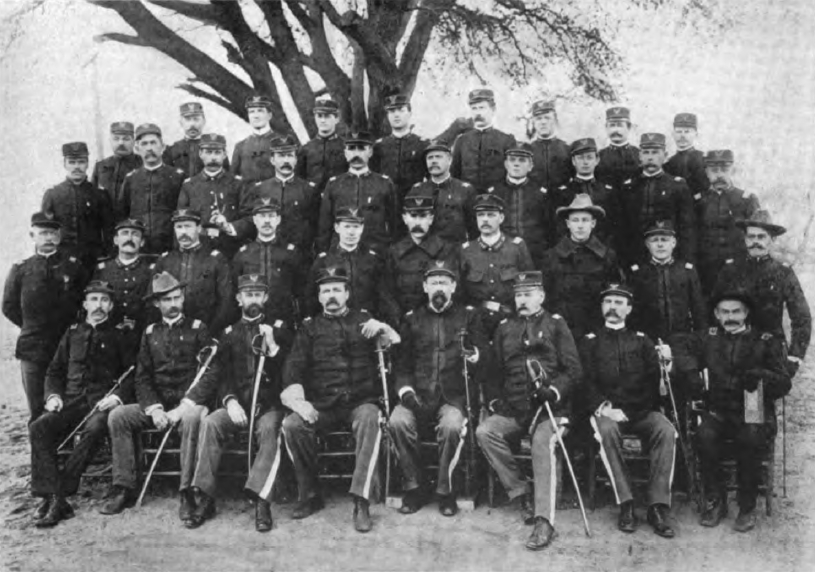
Colonel McCord with officers of the First Territorial Infantry

In early 1898, as many American politicians were calling for U.S. intervention in Cuba, McCord remained silent. The Arizona Gazette editorialized this by saying "Governor McCord in about the only executive that hasn't declared war. Hadn't you better move on the enemy, governor?" While publicly silent about Cuba, the governor sought permission to raise a regiment of volunteers behind the scenes. Permission arrived on April 3, 1898, when McCord received a telegram authorizing raising two companies of volunteer cavalry. The governor quickly responded by recommending James H. McClintock and Buckey O'Neill be appointed company commanders with Alexander O. Brodie recommended for the position of battalion commander. O'Neill began recruiting in the northern half of the territory while McClintock worked the south. With 210 slots to fill, the territory saw roughly 1000 men volunteer for service. The two companies of volunteers became part of the Rough Riders. After their arrival in San Antonio the group was reorganized into three companies with Joseph L. B. Alexander appointed captain of the third company.

Wishing to participate personally in the war against Spain, McCord used his influence with President McKinley to be appointed colonel of the First Territorial Infantry. On July 1, 1898, the governor requested a leave of absence so he could serve in the army. Secretary of Interior Cornelius N. Bliss responded with, "Do not see how you can recede your voluntary request to be commissioned as Colonel of Arizona regiment. I understand you have accepted command and it is important for the public service that your resignation as Governor be promptly forwarded to this Department." McCord submitted his resignation letter on July 9, with the resignation becoming effective on August 1.

The First Territorial Infantry had only reached Chickamauga Park when the war ended and despite never seeing combat, McCord later claimed to have no regrets about his resignation. He returned to Phoenix after mustering out on February 15, 1899.

== Later life ==
Shortly before being assassinated, President William McKinley appointed McCord United States Marshal for Arizona. McCord held the position for four years. Among his duties as U.S. Marshal was escorting Chinese aliens to San Francisco so they could be deported. McCord was not reappointed following his four-year term.

Sarah McCord, McCord's second wife, died on June 27, 1903. McCord remarried in St. Louis on August 10, 1904, taking Mary Emma Winslow, a second cousin to Sarah McCord, as his bride.

As statehood for Arizona approached, McCord was a supporter of a joint statehood plan with where Arizona would be combined with New Mexico. In February 1906, he was appointed Collector of Customs in Nogales, Arizona. McCord died from Bright's disease on April 27, 1908. He was buried in Merrill, Wisconsin.

Following his death, McCord's first and third wives engaged in a legal battle over his estate. Anna McCord claimed her divorce was not valid because she had not waived her community property rights and she had not been served papers before the divorce was finalized. In a ruling by the Arizona Territorial Supreme Court (McCord v. McCord (1911) 13 Arizona 277), the court ruled Mary McCord was the legal heir and that Anna McCord, if she believed her divorce to have been invalid, should have challenged the divorce's validity sometime during the three decades prior to her former husband's death.

U.S. House of Representatives
Preceded by Isaac Stephenson	Member of the U.S. House of Representatives from Wisconsin's 9th congressional district March 4, 1889 – March 3, 1891	Succeeded by Thomas Lynch
