= Alfred Franklin =

American judge

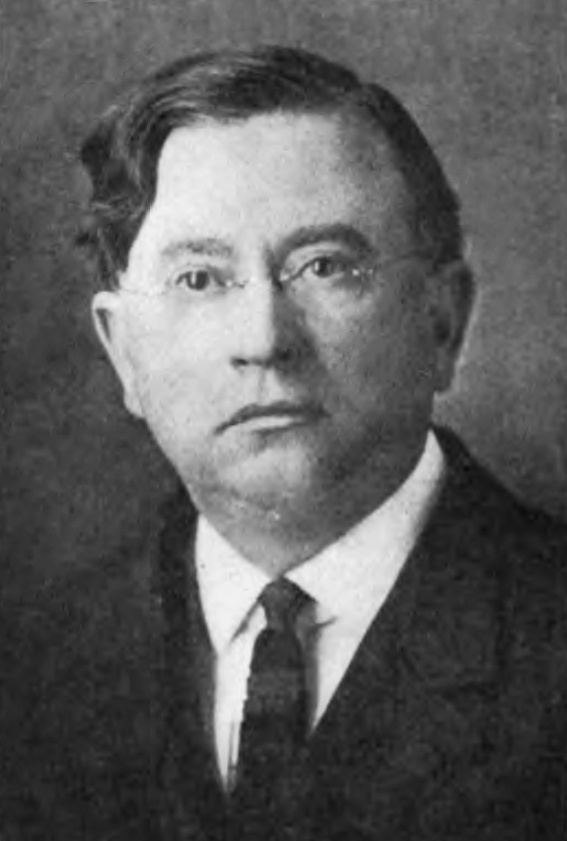
- Alfred Franklin, c. 1913

Chief Justice of the Arizona Supreme Court
- In office February 14, 1912 – January 1, 1915
- In office January 5, 1917 – November 13, 1918
- Preceded by: Edward Kent, Jr. (Territorial Supreme Court)

Justice of the Arizona Supreme Court
- In office February 14, 1912 – January 5, 1917
- Succeeded by: John Wilson Ross

Personal details
- Born: September 30, 1871 Kansas City, Missouri
- Died: Date unknown Place unknown
- Spouse: Cora Brill
- Profession: Attorney; jurist; government official

Alfred Morrison Franklin (September 30, 1871 – after 1948) was an American jurist and politician. He was the first chief justice of the Arizona Supreme Court and served as a member of Arizona's 1910 constitutional convention.

== Biography ==
Franklin was born in Kansas City, Missouri, on September 30, 1871, to Anne (Johnston) and Benjamin Joseph Franklin. His early education came in the Kansas City public schools. In 1885, Franklin's father was appointed United States consul to Hankow and the younger Franklin was educated by private tutors while the family lived in China.

After being admitted to the bar in 1893, Franklin began practicing law in Phoenix, Arizona Territory. He served as Assistant United States Attorney from 1895 to 1897 and during his father's term as Governor of Arizona Territory acted as the senior Franklin's personal secretary. Franklin married Cora Brill in 1901. The marriage produced two children: Kathleen and Josephine.

For Arizona's 1910 constitutional convention, Franklin was elected to represent Maricopa County. He was a member of the Committee on Style, Revision, and Compilation, which determined the final wording of the constitution. His political positions were those of a moderate progressive. During the convention he proposed including provisions supporting women's suffrage and prohibition in the document. The prohibition proposition was voted down 33 to 15. The women's suffrage proposal was likewise defeated.

As statehood approached, Franklin was elected to the Arizona Supreme Court and became the first chief justice. He served a total of three terms on the bench, the first and third as chief justice while Henry D. Ross was chief justice during Franklin's second term. He was defeated in the 1918 primary by Albert C. Baker with a vote of 14,419 to 12,275. The loss was attributed to voter discontent over the Arizona Supreme Court's ruling involving the disputed 1916 election results between Governor George W. P. Hunt and challenger Thomas E. Campbell. Franklin was named Collector of Internal Revenue for the Arizona-New Mexico District on October 24, 1918, and resigned his position on the bench shortly thereafter. He held the position until February 7, 1922.

Franklin's wife died from the Spanish flu on July 4, 1919. Franklin had an introverted personality and began withdrawing from society after her death. He eventually left his home and went to live alone in the desert. His last contact with his family occurred in 1938, but he is known to have lived for at least another decade. The date and place of Franklin's death are unknown.
