= Governor Franklin =

Governor Franklin may refer to:

- Benjamin Franklin (1706–1790), 6th President of Pennsylvania
- Benjamin Joseph Franklin (1839–1898), 12th Governor of Arizona Territory
- Jesse Franklin (1760–1823), 20th Governor of North Carolina
- John Franklin (1786–1847), Lieutenant-Governor of Van Diemen's Land from 1837 to 1843
- Michael Francklin (1733–1782), Lieutenant Governor of Nova Scotia from 1766 to 1772
- William Franklin (1731–1813), 13th Colonial Governor of New Jersey from 1763 to 1776
