= Maecenas E. Benton =

American politician (1848–1924)

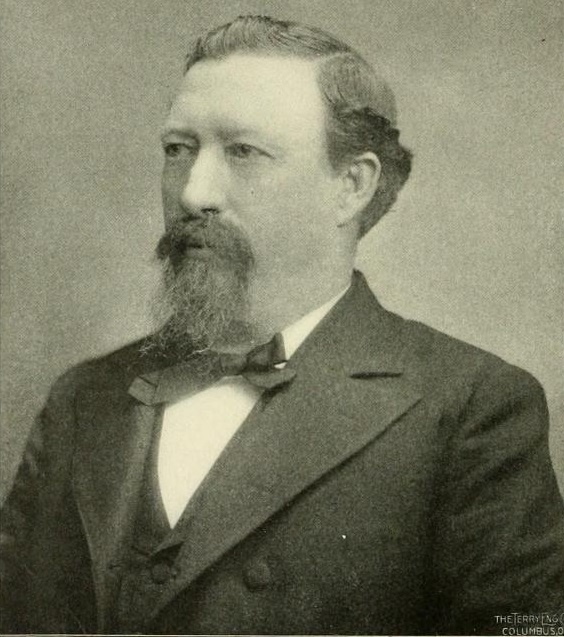
- From Volume 1 of 1899's Autobiographies and Portraits of the President, Cabinet, Supreme Court, and Fifty-fifth Congress

Member of the U.S. House of Representatives from Missouri's 15th district
- In office March 4, 1897 – March 3, 1905
- Preceded by: Charles Germman Burton
- Succeeded by: Cassius M. Shartel

Personal details
- Born: Maecenas Eason Benton; January 29, 1848 Dyersburg, Tennessee, U.S.
- Died: April 27, 1924 (aged 76) Springfield, Missouri, U.S.
- Resting place: Odd Fellows Cemetery, Neosho, Missouri
- Party: Democratic
- Children: 4, including Thomas
- Relatives: Thomas Hart Benton (uncle)
- Education: Saint Louis University
- Occupation: Lawyer; politician

Military service
- Allegiance: Confederate States
- Branch/service: Confederate States Army
- Battles/wars: American Civil War

Maecenas Eason Benton (January 29, 1848 – April 27, 1924) was a U.S. Representative from Missouri. He was the father of Thomas Hart Benton, who gained fame as a painter of the American Scene. His uncle was Thomas Hart Benton, one of the first two United States Senators elected from Missouri.

== Biography ==
Born near Dyersburg, Tennessee, Benton attended two west Tennessee academies and Saint Louis University. He was graduated from the Cumberland School of Law at Cumberland University, Lebanon, Tennessee, in 1870. He served in the Confederate States Army during the Civil War. He was admitted to the bar and commenced practice in Neosho, Missouri. He served as prosecuting attorney of Newton County, Missouri, from 1878 to 1884 and subsequently the United States attorney from March 1885 to July 1889. He also served as delegate to the 1896 Democratic National Convention. On June 24, 1888 he married Elizabeth Wise of Waxahachie, Texas.

=== Congressional career ===
Benton was elected as a Democrat to the 55th, 56th, 57th, and 58th congresses (March 4, 1897 – March 3, 1905). An unsuccessful candidate for re-election in 1904 to the 59th Congress, he resumed his law practice in Neosho, Missouri, and served as member of the State constitutional conventions in 1922 and 1924. He died in Springfield, Missouri, April 27, 1924 of throat cancer and was interred in the Odd Fellows Cemetery, Neosho, Missouri. He is pictured in the 1939 Neosho centennial mural, in Neosho, Missouri, by James Duard Marshall.

U.S. House of Representatives
| Preceded by Charles Germman Burton | Member of the U.S. House of Representatives from Missouri's 15th congressional district 1897–1905 | Succeeded by Cassius M. Shartel |
