= John Wilson Ross =

American judge (1863–1945)

- John Wilson Ross, circa 1939

Justice of the Arizona Supreme Court
- In office November 13, 1918 – January 6, 1919.
- Preceded by: Alfred Franklin
- Succeeded by: Albert C. Baker

Member of the Arizona Senate from the Cochise County district
- In office January 1, 1929 – December 31, 1930 Serving with Fred Sutter

Personal details
- Born: November 1863 Berryville, Arkansas, U.S.
- Died: June 30, 1945 (aged 81) Pueblo, Colorado, U.S.
- Party: Democrat

John Wilson Ross (November 1863 – June 30, 1945) was a justice of the Supreme Court of Arizona from November 13, 1918 to January 6, 1919. At 8 weeks, Ross served the shortest tenure in the court's history while his brother, Henry D. Ross, served the longest.

Ross was appointed by Governor George W. P. Hunt to replace outgoing Justice Alfred Franklin, who'd been defeated in the 1918 primary by Albert C. Baker. Franklin resigned before the end of his term to take a position as Collector of Internal Revenue for the Arizona–New Mexico District.

Ross later served in the 9th Arizona State Legislature, representing Cochise County.
