= Charles H. Morgan (politician) =

American politician (1842–1912)

Charles Henry Morgan
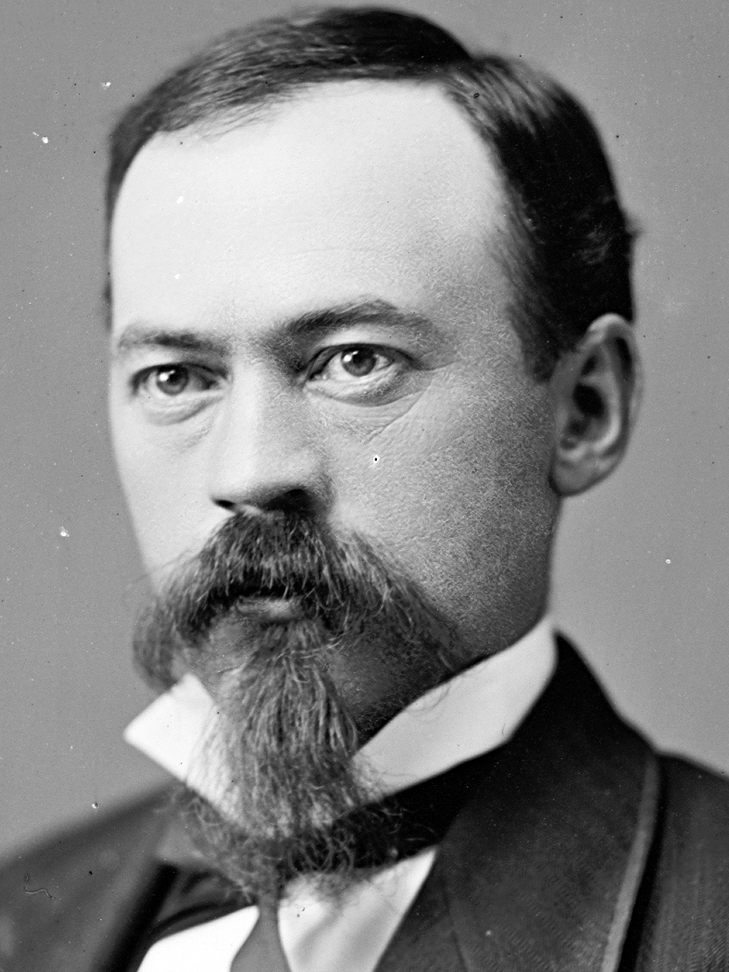

Member of the U.S. House of Representatives from Missouri
- In office March 4, 1909 – March 3, 1911
- Preceded by: Thomas Hackney
- Succeeded by: James A. Daugherty
- Constituency: 15th district
- In office March 4, 1893 – March 3, 1895
- Preceded by: Office established
- Succeeded by: Charles G. Burton
- Constituency: 15th district
- In office March 4, 1883 – March 3, 1885
- Preceded by: William H. Hatch
- Succeeded by: William J. Stone
- Constituency: 12th district
- In office March 4, 1875 – March 3, 1879
- Preceded by: Harrison E. Havens
- Succeeded by: James R. Waddill
- Constituency: 6th district

Personal details
- Born: July 5, 1842 Cuba, New York, U.S.
- Died: January 4, 1912 (aged 69) Joplin, Missouri, U.S.
- Resting place: Mount Hope Cemetery
- Party: Republican; Democratic (before 1896)
- Spouse: Clara Washburn (m. 1877–1912)
- Children: 1
- Relatives: Frederic A. Morgan (brother)
- Education: Albany Law School
- Profession: politician; lawyer

Military service
- Allegiance: United States
- Branch/service: United States Volunteers; Union Army
- Years of service: 1861–1865; 1898
- Rank: Lt. Colonel, USV
- Unit: 1st Reg. Wis. Vol. Infantry; 21st Reg. Wis. Vol. Infantry; 5th Reg. Mo. Vol. Infantry
- Battles/wars: American Civil War; Spanish–American War

Charles Henry Morgan (July 5, 1842 – January 4, 1912) was an American lawyer and politician from Missouri. He represented Missouri in the United States House of Representatives for five terms spread across four decades. He also served as a United States Army officer in the American Civil War and the Spanish–American War.

== Early life and education ==
Charles Henry Morgan was born in Cuba, New York, on July 5, 1842. His family moved to Pewaukee, Wisconsin, in 1845. He attended Fond du Lac High School in Fond du Lac, Wisconsin, in 1861.

After the Civil War, he went to Albany, New York, and graduated from Albany Law School in 1865.

== Career ==
=== Military career ===
At the outbreak of the American Civil War, Morgan was one of the first volunteers from Wisconsin to enlist in the Union Army. He was enrolled as a private in Company I of the 1st Wisconsin Infantry Regiment and went with the regiment to Virginia in June 1861. At the time, the regiment was only established as a three-month enlistment, and the regiment only participated in the Battle of Hoke's Run in present-day West Virginia before the expiration in August 1861.

Morgan decided to re-enlist for a three-year term, and at the reorganization of the 1st Wisconsin Infantry, he was assigned to Company K and promoted to sergeant. At the reorganization, he was joined by his brother Benjamin and his cousin William. In the Spring of 1862, Morgan was promoted to sergeant major of the regiment. Through this year of service, the 1st Wisconsin Infantry was mostly serving provost duty in Kentucky and Tennessee.

Morgan was commissioned as a second lieutenant in the Fall of 1862 and assigned to Company F of the 21st Wisconsin Infantry Regiment. The 21st Wisconsin Infantry saw extensive combat in the Tennessee and Kentucky theater of the war. Morgan was taken prisoner twice during the war, first after the Battle of Perryville, when he was quickly paroled, and then after the disastrous Battle of Chickamauga, when he was sent to Libby Prison, along with about 70 others of his regiment. He famously escaped from Libby Prison with Harrison Carroll Hobart and about 100 others in February 1864. After returning to his regiment, he was promoted to captain of Company H in April 1865. At the end of the war, he marched in the Grand Review of the Armies.

During the Spanish–American War he returned to service as lieutenant colonel of the Fifth Missouri Infantry Regiment.

=== Law career ===
He began practicing law in Lamar, Missouri. In 1868 he was prosecuting attorney of Barton County, Missouri; member of the Missouri House of Representatives in 1872–74. He practiced until 1884, and then he went into coal and zinc mining.

=== Political career ===
He served as a Democratic congressman in 1875–79, 1883–85 (during which he was chairman, Committee on Expenditures in the Post Office Department) and 1893–95. He was elected as a Republican in 1908 and served 1909–1911.

In 1907 he moved to Joplin, Missouri.

== Personal life ==
Charles Morgan was the eldest son among 11 children born to Henry Culver Morgan and his wife Lurancy (née Swift). Henry C. Morgan came to Black Wolf, Wisconsin, with his brother, Charles, and had a successful lumber mill operating until the Panic of 1857. Charles Morgan served several years on the Winnebago County board and was twice an unsuccessful candidate for state legislature.

Henry's younger brother Frederic A. Morgan served in the 39th Wisconsin Infantry Regiment and later represented Winnebago County in the Wisconsin State Assembly.

Charles H. Morgan married Clara Washburn, daughter of Judge Ganem W. Washburn of Oshkosh, Wisconsin, on March 14, 1877. He had a son, Frank B. Morgan.

== Death ==
Morgan died of pneumonia on January 4, 1912, in Joplin, Missouri. He is interred in Mount Hope Cemetery.

U.S. House of Representatives
Preceded by Harrison Eugene Havens	Member of the U.S. House of Representatives from Missouri's 6th congressional district March 4, 1875 – March 3, 1879	Succeeded by James Richard Waddill
Preceded by William H. Hatch	Member of the U.S. House of Representatives from Missouri's 12th congressional district March 4, 1883 – March 3, 1885	Succeeded by William J. Stone
New district established	Member of the U.S. House of Representatives from Missouri's 15th congressional district March 4, 1893 – March 3, 1895	Succeeded by Charles Germman Burton
Preceded by Thomas Hackney	Member of the U.S. House of Representatives from Missouri's 15th congressional district March 4, 1909 – March 3, 1911	Succeeded by James Alexander Daugherty
