= Harrison E. Havens =

American lawyer and politician (1837–1916)

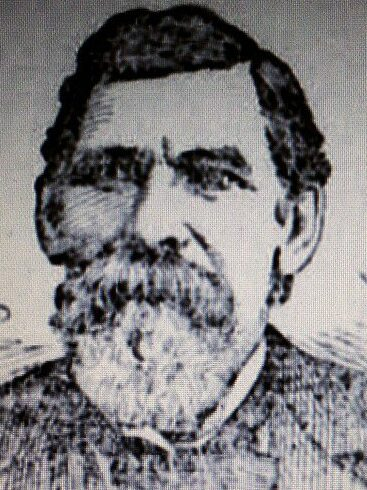

Member of the Oklahoma Territorial Council from the 10th district
- In office 1899–1901
- Preceded by: Erastus J. Clark
- Succeeded by: R. E. P. Messall

Member of the U.S. House of Representatives from Missouri
- In office March 4, 1871 – March 3, 1875
- Preceded by: Abram Comingo
- Succeeded by: Robert Anthony Hatcher
- Constituency: 4th district (1871–1873); 6th district (1873–1875)

Personal details
- Born: December 15, 1837 Franklin County, Ohio, US
- Died: August 16, 1916 (aged 78) Havana, Cuba
- Resting place: Colon Cemetery, Havana
- Party: Republican

Harrison Eugene Havens (December 15, 1837 – August 16, 1916) was an American lawyer and politician. Havens was born in Franklin County, Ohio, and was the Republican Party Representative from Missouri from its 4th congressional district in the 42nd United States Congress between 1871 and 1873, and from its 6th congressional district in the 43rd United States Congress from 1873 to 1875.

== Biography ==
Havens was born in Franklin County, Ohio, on December 15, 1837. He attended the local schools, studied law, was admitted to the bar, and practiced in Ohio before moving to Iowa to practice law and edit the Sigourney News newspaper.

During the American Civil War Havens served as commander of Company H, 47th Iowa Volunteer Infantry with the rank of captain.

After the war Havens moved to Illinois, and then to Springfield, Missouri, where he edited the Springfield Patriot newspaper in addition to practicing law.

In 1870 Havens was elected as a Republican to the Forty-second Congress. He was reelected to the Forty-third Congresses, and served from March 4, 1871, to March 3, 1875. In his second term Havens was chairman of the Committee on Public Expenditures. He was an unsuccessful candidate for reelection in 1874, and for the Missouri Senate in 1878.

In 1881 Havens became superintendent of the Springfield & Western Missouri Railway Company. From 1893 to 1894 he served as prosecuting attorney of Greene County, Missouri.

Havens subsequently moved to Oklahoma, living first in Guthrie, and then in Enid. He was editor of the Enid Eagle newspaper, and served as a member of the Oklahoma Territory's Legislative Council in the late 1890s, where he was a prominent supporter of the unsuccessful effort to achieve immediate statehood.

In the early 1900s Havens moved to Cuba where he owned a plantation. He became ill in 1916 and was taken to Havana, where he died on August 16. Havens was buried at Colon Cemetery in Havana.

U.S. House of Representatives
Preceded by Sempronius H. Boyd	Member of the U.S. House of Representatives from Missouri's 4th congressional district 1871–1873	Succeeded by Robert Anthony Hatcher
Preceded by Abram Comingo	Member of the U.S. House of Representatives from Missouri's 6th congressional district 1873–1875	Succeeded by Charles Henry Morgan
