= Thomas Hackney =

American politician (1861–1946)

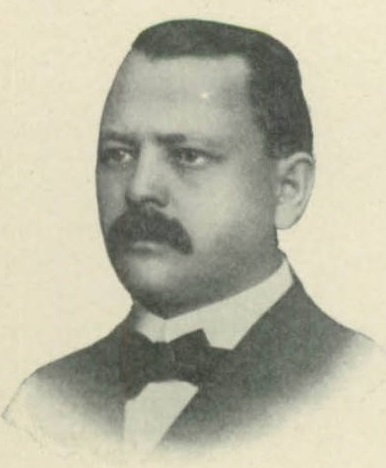
Hackney in the Official Manual of the State of Missouri 1907–1908

Thomas Hackney (December 11, 1861 – December 24, 1946) was a U.S. representative from Missouri.

Born near Campbellsville, Tennessee, Hackney moved with his parents to Jackson County, Illinois, in 1864. He attended the common schools of Jackson County, the Southern Illinois Normal University at Carbondale, and the University of Missouri. He studied law. He was admitted to the bar September 18, 1886, and commenced practice in Carthage, Missouri. He was also interested in zinc and lead mines in the Joplin district. He served as member of the State house of representatives in 1901.

Hackney was elected as a Democrat to the Sixtieth Congress (March 4, 1907 – March 3, 1909). He was an unsuccessful candidate for reelection in 1908 to the Sixty-first Congress. He resumed the practice of law in Carthage, Missouri. He served as delegate to the Democratic National Convention in 1912. He moved to Kansas City, Missouri, in 1914 and continued the practice of law. He served as general counsel for the Missouri Pacific Railroad in 1914–1932. He retired from public life and resided in Kansas City, Missouri, until his death there on December 24, 1946. He was interred in Elmwood Cemetery.

U.S. House of Representatives
Preceded by Cassius M. Shartel	Member of the U.S. House of Representatives from Missouri's 15th congressional district 1907–1909	Succeeded by Charles H. Morgan
