= Missouri's 8th congressional district =

U.S. House district for Missouri

Coordinates: 37°11′39″N 90°56′04″W

- Interactive map of district boundaries since January 3, 2023 (Note: The district includes the same census blocks as drawn for the 2020 redistricting cycle in 2022 and during mid-decade redistricting in 2025. As such, boundaries of the district will not change at the 2026 elections.)
- Representative: Jason Smith; R–Salem
- Distribution: 61.71% rural; 38.29% urban
- Population (2025): 781,933
- Median household income: $64,236
- Ethnicity: 86.8% White; 4.8% Two or more races; 4.5% Black; 2.4% Hispanic; 0.8% Asian; 0.6% other
- Cook PVI: R+27

Missouri's 8th congressional district is one of 435 congressional districts in the United States and one of eight congressional districts in the state of Missouri. The district encompasses rural Southeast Missouri and South Central Missouri as well as some counties in Southwest Missouri. The district stretches from the Bootheel in the south to the St. Louis southern exurbs of Festus, Hillsboro, and surrounding areas in the Lead Belt; it ranges in the east to counties along the Mississippi River and in the west to counties along the Ozark Plateau near Branson. With a Cook Partisan Voting Index rating of R+27, it is the most Republican district in Missouri and the sixth-most Republican district nationwide.

== History ==
The district's largest city is Cape Girardeau. A predominantly rural district, the district votes strongly Republican for national offices. In 2004, President George W. Bush received 63% of the vote in the district over U.S. Senator John Kerry (D-Massachusetts) who clinched 36%. In 2008, U.S. Senator John McCain (R-Arizona) carried the district with 61.92% over U.S. Senator Barack Obama (D-Illinois), who received 36.42%. The district increased the margin for Republicans in 2012 when former Governor Mitt Romney (R-Massachusetts) gained 65.88% of the vote over President Barack Obama's 31.99%. The district swung towards Republican Donald Trump in the 2016 presidential election. Trump garnered 75.4% of the vote, Democratic Nominee Hillary Clinton received just 21.0% of the vote, making it one of the most strongly Republican congressional districts in the United States.

Jason T. Smith, a Republican, has represented the district in the U.S. Congress since winning a special election on June 4, 2013. The incumbent Republican U.S. Representative Jo Ann Emerson resigned on January 22, 2013, to take a position as CEO for the National Rural Electric Cooperative Association.

Missouri lost one of its nine congressional district seats following redistricting based on population numbers from the 2010 U.S. census. The Republican-controlled state legislature decided to redefine Missouri's 3rd congressional district, which was represented by U.S. Representative Russ Carnahan (D-St. Louis). The district included all of Ste. Genevieve and Jefferson counties and southern St. Louis County and the neighborhoods making up what is known as South City of St. Louis. Missouri's 8th congressional district lost its Taney County parts (which were redistricted to the Southwestern-based 7th congressional district, and picked up all of Crawford and Ste. Genevieve counties, and most of the southern and western rural parts of Jefferson County. Parts of Jefferson County that are now included in Missouri's 8th include all of the cities of Hillsboro, De Soto, and the Twin Cities of Festus and Crystal City.

== Composition ==
For the 118th and successive Congresses (based on redistricting following the 2020 census), the district contains all or portions of the following counties, townships, and municipalities:

Bollinger County (4)

All 4 communities

Butler County (6)

All 6 communities

Cape Girardeau County (11)

All 11 communities

Carter County (5)

All 5 communities

Dent County (2)

Bunker, Salem

Douglas County (1)

Ava

Dunklin County (13)

All 13 communities

Howell County (6)

All 6 communities

Iron County (7)

All 7 communities

Jefferson County (12)

Arnold, Barnhart, Crystal City, Festus, Herculaneum, Horine, Imperial, Kimmswick, Murphy, Olympian Village, Pevely, Summer Set

Madison County (6)

All 6 communities

Mississippi County (8)

All 8 communities

New Madrid County (15)

All 15 communities

Oregon County (4)

All 4 communities

Ozark County (6)

All 6 communities

Pemiscot County (13)

All 13 communities

Perry County (8)

All 8 communities

Phelps County (5)

All 5 communities

Reynolds County (3)

All 3 communities

Ripley County (4)

All 4 communities

Ste. Genevieve County (7)

All 7 communities

St. Francois County (15)

All 15 communities

Scott County (15)

All 15 communities

Shannon County (5)

All 5 communities

Stoddard County (11)

All 11 communities

Texas County (7)

All 7 communities

Wayne County (4)

All 4 communities

Wright County (4)

All 4 communities

=== Characteristics ===
Missouri's 8th is a relatively diverse congressional district. Although it is quite conservative and Republican-leaning at the federal level, Democrats formerly performed well here in local and state elections. Bill Clinton, a Democrat from neighboring Arkansas, carried the previous 8th district both times in 1992 and 1996; since then, however, voters in the district have solidly supported the past three Republican presidential nominees.

At the local level, Republicans control a majority of elected county offices in Southeast Missouri. In presidential elections, Democratic candidates formerly performed best in the Bootheel, an agricultural area that is the most impoverished region in the district (and the state, for that matter). It has a wide majority of whites and a significant minority of African Americans. Democrats also used to do well in the Lead Belt region, which contains a core constituency of voters who belong to labor unions, particularly in the mining industry.

The district takes in a large swath of the Bible Belt with evangelical Protestantism being the dominant religion in most counties in the district. This influence is demonstrated in conservative voters' positions on social issues such as abortion, gay rights and gun control. Racially, this district is predominantly white. Many voters here maintain a rural lifestyle where agriculture and farming are the backbone of the economy and are important issues of concern. Socioeconomically, it is the poorest district in Missouri (when measured by the median household income adjusted by inflation).

=== Largest cities ===
The 10 largest cities in the district are as follows.

| Rank | City | County | Population (2010) | Population (2015) | Population (2020) |
|---|---|---|---|---|---|
| 1 | Cape Girardeau | Cape Girardeau and Scott | 37,941 | 39,462 | 39,540 |
| 2 | Arnold | Jefferson | 20,875 | 21,213 | 20,858 |
| 3 | Rolla | Phelps | 19,559 | 20,019 | 19,943 |
| 4 | Farmington | St. Francois | 16,240 | 18,181 | 18,217 |
| 5 | Sikeston | Scott and New Madrid | 16,318 | 16,436 | 16,291 |
| 6 | Poplar Bluff | Butler | 17,023 | 17,266 | 16,225 |
| 7 | Jackson | Cape Girardeau | 13,758 | 14,869 | 15,481 |
| 8 | West Plains | Howell | 11,986 | 12,285 | 12,184 |
| 9 | Festus | Jefferson | 11,599 | 11,938 | 12,722 |
| 10 | Kennett | Dunklin | 10,932 | 10,662 | 10,515 |

== List of members representing the district ==
| Member | Party | Years | Cong ress | Electoral history | District location |
|---|---|---|---|---|---|
District created March 4, 1863
| William A. Hall (Huntsville) | Union | March 4, 1863 – March 3, 1865 | 38th | Redistricted from the 3rd district and re-elected in 1862. Retired. | |
| John F. Benjamin (Shelbyville) | Republican | March 4, 1865 – March 3, 1871 | 39th 40th 41st | Elected in 1864. Re-elected in 1866. Re-elected in 1868. Retired. | |
| James G. Blair (Canton) | Liberal; Republican | March 4, 1871 – March 3, 1873 | 42nd | Elected in 1870. Retired. | |
| Abram Comingo (Independence) | Democratic | March 4, 1873 – March 3, 1875 | 43rd | Redistricted from the 6th district and re-elected in 1872. Retired. | |
| Benjamin J. Franklin (Kansas City) | Democratic | March 4, 1875 – March 3, 1879 | 44th 45th | Elected in 1874. Re-elected in 1876. Withdrew during renomination. | |
| Samuel L. Sawyer (Independence) | Independent; Democratic | March 4, 1879 – March 3, 1881 | 46th | Elected in 1878. Retired. | |
| Robert T. Van Horn (Kansas City) | Republican | March 4, 1881 – March 3, 1883 | 47th | Elected in 1880. Lost re-election. | |
| John J. O'Neill (St. Louis) | Democratic | March 4, 1883 – March 3, 1889 | 48th 49th 50th | Elected in 1882. Re-elected in 1884. Re-elected in 1886. Lost re-election. | |
| Frederick G. Niedringhaus (St. Louis) | Republican | March 4, 1889 – March 3, 1891 | 51st | Elected in 1888. Retired. | |
| John J. O'Neill (St. Louis) | Democratic | March 4, 1891 – March 3, 1893 | 52nd | Elected in 1890. Redistricted to 11th district. | |
| Richard P. Bland (Lebanon) | Democratic | March 4, 1893 – March 3, 1895 | 53rd | Redistricted from the 11th district and re-elected in 1892. Lost re-election. | |
| Joel D. Hubbard (Versailles) | Republican | March 4, 1895 – March 3, 1897 | 54th | Elected in 1894. Lost re-election. | |
| Richard P. Bland (Lebanon) | Democratic | March 4, 1897 – June 15, 1899 | 55th 56th | Elected in 1896. Re-elected in 1898. Died. | |
| Vacant | | June 15, 1899 – August 29, 1899 | 56th | | |
| Dorsey W. Shackleford (Jefferson City) | Democratic | August 29, 1899 – March 3, 1919 | 56th 57th 58th 59th 60th 61st 62nd 63rd 64th 65th | Elected to finish Bland's term. Re-elected in 1900. Re-elected in 1902. Re-elected in 1904. Re-elected in 1906. Re-elected in 1908. Re-elected in 1910. Re-elected in 1912. Re-elected in 1914. Re-elected in 1916. Lost renomination. | |
| William L. Nelson (Columbia) | Democratic | March 4, 1919 – March 3, 1921 | 66th | Elected in 1918. Lost re-election. | |
| Sidney C. Roach (Linn Creek) | Republican | March 4, 1921 – March 3, 1925 | 67th 68th | Elected in 1920. Re-elected in 1922. Lost re-election. | |
| William L. Nelson (Columbia) | Democratic | March 4, 1925 – March 3, 1933 | 69th 70th 71st 72nd | Elected in 1924. Re-elected in 1926. Re-elected in 1928. Re-elected in 1930. Redistricted to the at-large district and lost renomination. | |
| District inactive | | March 4, 1933 – January 3, 1935 | 73rd | All representatives elected At-large on a general ticket | |
| Clyde Williams (Hillsboro) | Democratic | January 3, 1935 – January 3, 1943 | 74th 75th 76th 77th | Redistricted from the at-large district and re-elected in 1934. Re-elected in 1936. Re-elected in 1938. Re-elected in 1940. Lost re-election. | |
| William P. Elmer (Salem) | Republican | January 3, 1943 – January 3, 1945 | 78th | Elected in 1942. Lost re-election. | |
| A. S. J. Carnahan (Ellsinore) | Democratic | January 3, 1945 – January 3, 1947 | 79th | Elected in 1944. Lost re-election. | |
| Parke M. Banta (Arcadia) | Republican | January 3, 1947 – January 3, 1949 | 80th | Elected in 1946. Lost re-election. | |
| A. S. J. Carnahan (Ellsinore) | Democratic | January 3, 1949 – January 3, 1961 | 81st 82nd 83rd 84th 85th 86th | Elected in 1948. Re-elected in 1950. Re-elected in 1952. Re-elected in 1954. Re-elected in 1956. Re-elected in 1958. Lost renomination. | |
| Richard H. Ichord II (Houston) | Democratic | January 3, 1961 – January 3, 1981 | 87th 88th 89th 90th 91st 92nd 93rd 94th 95th 96th | Elected in 1960. Re-elected in 1962. Re-elected in 1964. Re-elected in 1966. Re-elected in 1968. Re-elected in 1970. Re-elected in 1972. Re-elected in 1974. Re-elected in 1976. Re-elected in 1978. Retired. | |
| Wendell Bailey (Willow Springs) | Republican | January 3, 1981 – January 3, 1983 | 97th | Elected in 1980. Redistricted to the 4th district and lost re-election. | |
| Bill Emerson (Cape Girardeau) | Republican | January 3, 1983 – June 22, 1996 | 98th 99th 100th 101st 102nd 103rd 104th | Redistricted from the 10th district and re-elected in 1982. Re-elected in 1984. Re-elected in 1986. Re-elected in 1988. Re-elected in 1990. Re-elected in 1992. Re-elected in 1994. Ran for re-election, but died. | 1983–1993 [data missing] |
| Bill Emerson (Cape Girardeau) | Republican | January 3, 1983 – June 22, 1996 | 98th 99th 100th 101st 102nd 103rd 104th | Redistricted from the 10th district and re-elected in 1982. Re-elected in 1984. Re-elected in 1986. Re-elected in 1988. Re-elected in 1990. Re-elected in 1992. Re-elected in 1994. Ran for re-election, but died. | 1993–2003 [data missing] |
| Vacant | | June 22, 1996 – November 5, 1996 | 104th | | 1993–2003 [data missing] |
| Jo Ann Emerson (Cape Girardeau) | Republican | November 5, 1996 – January 3, 1997 | 104th 105th 106th 107th 108th 109th 110th 111th 112th 113th | Elected to finish her husband's term. Elected to full term in 1996. Re-elected in 1998. Re-elected in 2000. Re-elected in 2002. Re-elected in 2004. Re-elected in 2006. Re-elected in 2008. Re-elected in 2010. Re-elected in 2012. Resigned to become CEO of NRECA. | 1993–2003 [data missing] |
| Jo Ann Emerson (Cape Girardeau) | Independent | January 3, 1997 – January 8, 1997 | 104th 105th 106th 107th 108th 109th 110th 111th 112th 113th | Elected to finish her husband's term. Elected to full term in 1996. Re-elected in 1998. Re-elected in 2000. Re-elected in 2002. Re-elected in 2004. Re-elected in 2006. Re-elected in 2008. Re-elected in 2010. Re-elected in 2012. Resigned to become CEO of NRECA. | 1993–2003 [data missing] |
| Jo Ann Emerson (Cape Girardeau) | Republican | January 8, 1997 – January 22, 2013 | 104th 105th 106th 107th 108th 109th 110th 111th 112th 113th | Elected to finish her husband's term. Elected to full term in 1996. Re-elected in 1998. Re-elected in 2000. Re-elected in 2002. Re-elected in 2004. Re-elected in 2006. Re-elected in 2008. Re-elected in 2010. Re-elected in 2012. Resigned to become CEO of NRECA. | 1993–2003 [data missing] |
| Jo Ann Emerson (Cape Girardeau) | Republican | January 8, 1997 – January 22, 2013 | 104th 105th 106th 107th 108th 109th 110th 111th 112th 113th | Elected to finish her husband's term. Elected to full term in 1996. Re-elected in 1998. Re-elected in 2000. Re-elected in 2002. Re-elected in 2004. Re-elected in 2006. Re-elected in 2008. Re-elected in 2010. Re-elected in 2012. Resigned to become CEO of NRECA. | 2003–2013 |
| Vacant | | January 22, 2013 – June 5, 2013 | 113th | | 2003–2013 |
| Jason Smith (Salem) | Republican | June 5, 2013 – present | 113th 114th 115th 116th 117th 118th 119th | Elected to finish Emerson's term. Re-elected in 2014. Re-elected in 2016. Re-elected in 2018. Re-elected in 2020. Re-elected in 2022. Re-elected in 2024. Re-elected in 2026. | 2003–2013 |
| Jason Smith (Salem) | Republican | June 5, 2013 – present | 113th 114th 115th 116th 117th 118th 119th | Elected to finish Emerson's term. Re-elected in 2014. Re-elected in 2016. Re-elected in 2018. Re-elected in 2020. Re-elected in 2022. Re-elected in 2024. Re-elected in 2026. | 2013–2023 |
| Jason Smith (Salem) | Republican | June 5, 2013 – present | 113th 114th 115th 116th 117th 118th 119th | Elected to finish Emerson's term. Re-elected in 2014. Re-elected in 2016. Re-elected in 2018. Re-elected in 2020. Re-elected in 2022. Re-elected in 2024. Re-elected in 2026. | 2023–2027 |

== Recent election results from statewide races ==
| Year | Office | Results |
|---|---|---|
| 2008 | President | McCain 58% - 39% |
| 2012 | President | Romney 66% - 34% |
| 2012 | Senate | McCaskill 47.2% - 46.8% |
| 2012 | Governor | Nixon 49% - 48% |
| 2016 | President | Trump 74% - 23% |
| 2016 | Senate | Blunt 61% - 34% |
| 2016 | Governor | Greitens 64% - 33% |
| 2016 | Lt. Governor | Parson 64% - 31% |
| 2016 | Secretary of State | Ashcroft 69% - 27% |
| 2016 | Attorney General | Hawley 71% - 29% |
| 2018 | Senate | Hawley 67% - 30% |
| 2018 | Auditor | McDowell 61% - 34% |
| 2020 | President | Trump 75% - 24% |
| 2020 | Governor | Parson 73% - 24% |
| 2020 | Lt. Governor | Kehoe 75% - 23% |
| 2020 | Secretary of State | Ashcroft 77% - 20% |
| 2020 | Treasurer | Fitzpatrick 75% - 22% |
| 2020 | Attorney General | Schmitt 76% - 22% |
| 2022 | Senate | Schmitt 73% - 24% |
| 2024 | President | Trump 76% - 23% |
| 2024 | Senate | Hawley 73% - 24% |
| 2024 | Governor | Kehoe 76% - 22% |
| 2024 | Lt. Governor | Wasinger 74% - 22% |
| 2024 | Secretary of State | Hoskins 74% - 23% |
| 2024 | Treasurer | Malek 74% - 22% |
| 2024 | Attorney General | Bailey 77% - 21% |

== Recent election results ==
=== 2012 ===
Missouri's 8th congressional district, 2012
| Party | Candidate | Votes | % |
|---|---|---|---|
| Republican | Jo Ann Emerson (incumbent) | 216,083 | 71.93 |
| Democratic | Jack Rushin | 73,755 | 24.55 |
| Libertarian | Rob Vandeven | 10,553 | 3.51 |
| Total votes | | 300,391 | 100.00 |
| Republican hold | | | |

=== 2013 special ===
2013 Missouri 8th congressional district special election
| Party | Candidate | Votes | % |
|---|---|---|---|
| Republican | Jason Smith | 42,141 | 67.1 |
| Democratic | Steve Hodges | 17,207 | 27.4 |
| Constitution | Doug Enyart | 2,265 | 3.6 |
| Libertarian | Bill Slantz | 968 | 1.5 |
| Write-in | | 185 | 0.3 |
| Total votes | | 62,766 | 100 |
| Republican hold | | | |

=== 2014 ===
Missouri's 8th congressional district, 2014
| Party | Candidate | Votes | % |
|---|---|---|---|
| Republican | Jason Smith (incumbent) | 106,124 | 66.6 |
| Democratic | Barbara Stocker | 38,721 | 24.3 |
| Independent | Terry Hampton | 6,821 | 4.3 |
| Constitution | Doug Enyart | 3,799 | 2.4 |
| Libertarian | Rick Vandeven | 3,759 | 2.4 |
| Total votes | | 159,224 | 100.0 |
| Republican hold | | | |

=== 2016 ===
Missouri's 8th congressional district, 2016
| Party | Candidate | Votes | % |
|---|---|---|---|
| Republican | Jason Smith (incumbent) | 229,792 | 74.4 |
| Democratic | Dave Cowell | 70,009 | 22.7 |
| Libertarian | Jonathan Shell | 9,070 | 2.9 |
| Total votes | | 308,871 | 100.0 |
| Republican hold | | | |

=== 2018 ===
Missouri's 8th congressional district, 2018
| Party | Candidate | Votes | % |
|---|---|---|---|
| Republican | Jason Smith (incumbent) | 194,042 | 73.4 |
| Democratic | Kathy Ellis | 66,151 | 25.0 |
| Libertarian | Jonathan Shell | 4,206 | 1.6 |
| Total votes | | 264,399 | 100.0 |
| Republican hold | | | |

=== 2020 ===
Missouri's 8th congressional district, 2020
| Party | Candidate | Votes | % |
|---|---|---|---|
| Republican | Jason Smith (incumbent) | 253,811 | 76.9 |
| Democratic | Kathy Ellis | 70,561 | 21.4 |
| Libertarian | Tom Schmitz | 5,854 | 1.8 |
| Total votes | | 330,226 | 100.0 |
| Republican hold | | | |

=== 2022 ===
2022 Missouri's 8th congressional district election
| Party | Candidate | Votes | % |
|---|---|---|---|
| Republican | Jason Smith (incumbent) | 186,472 | 76.0 |
| Democratic | Randi McCallian | 53,738 | 21.9 |
| Libertarian | Jim Higgins | 5,185 | 2.1 |
| Total votes | | 245,395 | 100.0 |
| Republican hold | | | |

=== 2024 ===
2024 Missouri's 8th congressional district election
| Party | Candidate | Votes | % |
|---|---|---|---|
| Republican | Jason Smith (incumbent) | 271,249 | 76.18 |
| Democratic | Randi McCallian | 77,649 | 21.81 |
| Libertarian | Jake Dawson | 7,166 | 2.01 |
| Total votes | | 356,064 | 100.0 |
| Republican hold | | | |

=== Prior elections ===
==== 2000 ====
| County | George W. Bush | % | Al Gore | % | Ralph Nader | % | Others | % | Margin | % | Total |
|---|---|---|---|---|---|---|---|---|---|---|---|
| Bollinger | 3,487 | 65.87% | 1,692 | 31.96% | 41 | 0.77% | 74 | 1.40% | −1,795 | R+ 33.91% | 5,294 |
| Butler | 9,111 | 63.28% | 4,996 | 34.70% | 149 | 1.03% | 141 | 0.99% | −4,115 | R+ 28.58% | 14,397 |
| Cape Girardeau | 19,832 | 66.42% | 9,334 | 31.26% | 376 | 1.26% | 317 | 1.06% | −10,498 | R+ 35.16% | 29,859 |
| Carter | 1,730 | 61.61% | 997 | 35.51% | 40 | 1.42% | 41 | 1.46% | −733 | R+ 26.10% | 2,808 |
| Crawford | 4,754 | 57.26% | 3,350 | 40.35% | 100 | 1.20% | 98 | 1.19% | −1,404 | R+ 16.91% | 8,302 |
| Dent | 3,996 | 66.73% | 1,839 | 30.71% | 66 | 1.10% | 87 | 1.46% | −2,157 | R+ 36.02% | 5,988 |
| Dunklin | 5,426 | 51.55% | 4,947 | 47.00% | 78 | 0.74% | 74 | 0.70% | −479 | R+ 4.55% | 10,525 |
| Howell | 9,018 | 64.07% | 4,641 | 32.97% | 197 | 1.40% | 219 | 1.56% | −4,377 | R+ 31.10% | 14,075 |
| Iron | 2,237 | 50.68% | 2,044 | 46.31% | 64 | 1.45% | 69 | 1.56% | −193 | R+ 4.37% | 4,414 |
| Madison | 2,460 | 56.25% | 1,828 | 41.80% | 42 | 0.96% | 43 | 0.99% | −632 | R+ 14.45% | 4,373 |
| Mississippi | 2,395 | 45.93% | 2,756 | 52.85% | 29 | 0.56% | 35 | 0.67% | −361 | D+ 6.92% | 5,215 |
| New Madrid | 3,416 | 47.01% | 3,738 | 51.45% | 45 | 0.62% | 67 | 0.92% | −322 | D+ 4.44% | 7,266 |
| Oregon | 2,521 | 59.56% | 1,568 | 37.04% | 60 | 1.42% | 84 | 1.98% | −953 | R+ 22.52% | 4,233 |
| Pemiscot | 2,750 | 45.38% | 3,245 | 53.55% | 37 | 0.61% | 28 | 0.46% | −495 | D+ 8.17% | 6,060 |
| Perry | 4,667 | 67.61% | 2,085 | 30.20% | 70 | 1.01% | 81 | 1.17% | −2,582 | R+ 37.41% | 6,903 |
| Phelps | 9,444 | 58.49% | 6,262 | 38.78% | 253 | 1.57% | 187 | 1.16% | −3,182 | R+ 19.71% | 16,146 |
| Reynolds | 1,762 | 56.28% | 1,298 | 41.46% | 42 | 1.34% | 29 | 0.92% | −464 | R+ 14.82% | 3,131 |
| Ripley | 3,121 | 61.62% | 1,820 | 35.93% | 58 | 1.15% | 66 | 1.30% | −1,301 | R+ 25.69% | 5,065 |
| Scott | 8,999 | 57.30% | 6,452 | 41.09% | 113 | 0.72% | 130 | 0.83% | −2,547 | R+ 16.21% | 15,704 |
| Shannon | 2,245 | 59.38% | 1,430 | 37.82% | 48 | 1.27% | 58 | 1.53% | −815 | R+ 21.56% | 3,781 |
| St. Francois | 9,327 | 49.50% | 9,075 | 48.17% | 265 | 1.41% | 174 | 0.93% | −252 | R+ 1.33% | 18,841 |
| Stoddard | 7,727 | 62.04% | 4,476 | 35.94% | 114 | 0.92% | 137 | 1.10% | −3,251 | R+ 26.10% | 12,454 |
| Texas | 6,136 | 61.78% | 3,486 | 35.10% | 137 | 1.38% | 173 | 1.74% | −2,650 | R+ 26.68% | 9,932 |
| Washington | 4,020 | 48.64% | 4,047 | 48.97% | 95 | 1.15% | 103 | 1.25% | −27 | D+ 0.33% | 8,265 |
| Wayne | 3,346 | 57.22% | 2,387 | 40.82% | 55 | 0.94% | 60 | 1.03% | −959 | R+ 16.40% | 5,848 |
| Wright | 5,391 | 68.75% | 2,250 | 28.70% | 86 | 1.10% | 114 | 1.45% | −3,141 | R+ 40.05% | 7,841 |
| District Total | 139,318 | 58.85% | 92,043 | 38.88% | 2,660 | 1.12% | 2,689 | 1.14% | 47,275 | R+ 19.97% | 236,720 |

==== 2004 ====
| County | George W. Bush | % | John Kerry | % | Others | % | Margin | % | Total |
|---|---|---|---|---|---|---|---|---|---|
| Bollinger | 4,102 | 69.58% | 1,754 | 29.75% | 39 | 0.63% | −2,348 | R+ 39.83% | 5,895 |
| Butler | 11,696 | 71.14% | 4,666 | 28.38% | 79 | 0.48% | −7,030 | R+ 42.76% | 16,441 |
| Cape Girardeau | 23,814 | 68.90% | 10,568 | 30.57% | 183 | 0.53% | −13,246 | R+ 38.33% | 34,565 |
| Carter | 1,797 | 64.66% | 964 | 34.69% | 18 | 0.64% | −833 | R+ 29.97% | 2,779 |
| Dent | 4,369 | 69.31% | 1,865 | 29.58% | 70 | 1.12% | −2,504 | R+ 39.73% | 6,304 |
| Douglas | 4,498 | 71.09% | 1,741 | 27.52% | 88 | 1.39% | −2,757 | R+ 43.57% | 6,327 |
| Dunklin | 6,720 | 57.55% | 4,901 | 41.97% | 56 | 0.48% | −1,819 | R+ 15.58% | 11,677 |
| Howell | 11,097 | 67.75% | 5,118 | 31.25% | 164 | 1.00% | −5,979 | R+ 36.50% | 16,379 |
| Iron | 2,477 | 52.94% | 2,157 | 46.10% | 45 | 0.96% | −320 | R+ 6.84% | 4,679 |
| Madison | 2,905 | 59.07% | 1,972 | 40.10% | 41 | 0.84% | −933 | R+ 18.97% | 4,918 |
| Mississippi | 2,903 | 54.79% | 2,374 | 44.81% | 21 | 0.40% | −529 | R+ 9.98% | 5,298 |
| New Madrid | 4,154 | 52.54% | 3,716 | 47.00% | 37 | 0.47% | −438 | R+ 5.54% | 7,907 |
| Oregon | 2,769 | 59.26% | 1,823 | 39.01% | 81 | 1.74% | −946 | R+ 20.25% | 4,673 |
| Ozark | 3,083 | 65.50% | 1,561 | 33.16% | 63 | 1.34% | −1,522 | R+ 32.34% | 4,707 |
| Pemiscot | 3,398 | 49.93% | 3,381 | 49.68% | 27 | 0.40% | −17 | R+ 0.25% | 6,806 |
| Perry | 5,583 | 67.70% | 2,621 | 31.78% | 43 | 0.52% | −2,962 | R+ 35.92% | 8,247 |
| Phelps | 11,874 | 63.50% | 6,666 | 35.65% | 160 | 0.75% | −5,208 | R+ 27.85% | 18,700 |
| Reynolds | 1,896 | 56.36% | 1,449 | 43.07% | 19 | 0.57% | −447 | R+ 13.29% | 3,364 |
| Ripley | 3,693 | 65.33% | 1,907 | 33.73% | 53 | 0.94% | −1,786 | R+ 31.60% | 5,653 |
| Scott | 11,330 | 64.94% | 6,057 | 34.71% | 61 | 0.35% | −5,273 | R+ 30.23% | 17,448 |
| Shannon | 2,511 | 60.26% | 1,618 | 38.83% | 38 | 0.92% | −893 | R+ 21.43% | 4,167 |
| St. Francois | 12,087 | 52.71% | 10,748 | 46.87% | 98 | 0.43% | −1,339 | R+ 5.84% | 22,933 |
| Stoddard | 9,242 | 69.74% | 3,946 | 29.78% | 64 | 0.48% | −5,296 | R+ 39.96% | 13,252 |
| Taney* | 3,496 | 67.53% | 1,644 | 31.76% | 37 | 0.71% | −1,852 | R+ 35.77% | 5,177 |
| Texas | 7,234 | 65.66% | 3,664 | 33.25% | 120 | 1.09% | −3,570 | R+ 32.41% | 11,018 |
| Washington | 4,641 | 50.57% | 4,459 | 48.58% | 78 | 0.84% | −182 | R+ 1.99% | 9,178 |
| Wayne | 3,919 | 63.17% | 2,250 | 36.27% | 35 | 0.57% | −1,669 | R+ 26.90% | 6,204 |
| Wright | 6,090 | 72.97% | 2,188 | 26.22% | 68 | 0.82% | −3,902 | R+ 46.75% | 8,346 |
| District Total | 173,378 | 63.50% | 97,778 | 35.81% | 1,886 | 0.69% | 75,600 | R+ 27.69% | 273,042 |

- These numbers reflect only the eastern sections of Taney County that were included in the 8th Congressional District.

==== 2008 ====
| County | John McCain | % | Barack Obama | % | Others | % | Margin | % | Total |
|---|---|---|---|---|---|---|---|---|---|
| Bollinger | 3,972 | 68.67% | 1,690 | 29.22% | 122 | 2.11% | −2,282 | R+ 39.45% | 5,784 |
| Butler | 11,805 | 68.09% | 5,316 | 30.66% | 217 | 1.25% | −6,489 | R+ 37.43% | 17,338 |
| Cape Girardeau | 24,768 | 66.30% | 12,208 | 32.68% | 379 | 1.01% | −12,560 | R+ 33.62% | 37,446 |
| Carter | 1,840 | 63.49% | 984 | 33.95% | 74 | 2.55% | −856 | R+ 29.54% | 2,898 |
| Dent | 4,655 | 67.78% | 2,056 | 29.94% | 157 | 2.29% | −2,599 | R+ 37.84% | 6,868 |
| Douglas | 4,405 | 65.63% | 2,140 | 31.88% | 167 | 2.49% | −2,265 | R+ 33.75% | 6,712 |
| Dunklin | 7,044 | 59.88% | 4,540 | 38.59% | 180 | 1.53% | −2,504 | R+ 21.29% | 11,764 |
| Howell | 10,982 | 64.49% | 5,736 | 33.68% | 311 | 1.83% | −5,246 | R+ 30.81% | 17,029 |
| Iron | 2,090 | 47.35% | 2,213 | 50.14% | 111 | 2.51% | −123 | D+ 2.79% | 4,414 |
| Madison | 2,897 | 57.62% | 2,042 | 40.61% | 89 | 1.77% | −855 | R+ 17.01% | 5,028 |
| Mississippi | 3,034 | 56.65% | 2,247 | 41.95% | 75 | 1.40% | −787 | R+ 14.70% | 5,356 |
| New Madrid | 4,593 | 56.76% | 3,370 | 41.65% | 129 | 1.59% | −1,223 | R+ 15.11% | 8,092 |
| Oregon | 2,652 | 57.77% | 1,811 | 39.45% | 128 | 2.78% | −841 | R+ 18.32% | 4,591 |
| Ozark | 2,918 | 62.27% | 1,661 | 35.45% | 107 | 2.28% | −1,257 | R+ 26.82% | 4,686 |
| Pemiscot | 3,954 | 56.11% | 3,029 | 42.98% | 64 | 0.91% | −925 | R+ 13.13% | 7,047 |
| Perry | 5,527 | 63.92% | 3,005 | 34.75% | 115 | 1.33% | −2,522 | R+ 29.17% | 8,647 |
| Phelps | 11,706 | 60.22% | 7,394 | 38.04% | 338 | 1.74% | −4,312 | R+ 22.18% | 19,524 |
| Reynolds | 1,782 | 54.21% | 1,418 | 43.14% | 87 | 2.65% | −364 | R+ 11.07% | 3,287 |
| Ripley | 3,407 | 63.53% | 1,795 | 33.47% | 161 | 3.00% | −1,612 | R+ 30.06% | 5,363 |
| Scott | 11,563 | 64.15% | 6,258 | 34.72% | 205 | 1.13% | −5,305 | R+ 29.43% | 18,082 |
| Shannon | 2,075 | 54.06% | 1,637 | 42.65% | 126 | 3.29% | −438 | R+ 11.41% | 3,838 |
| St. Francois | 12,660 | 51.57% | 11,540 | 47.01% | 350 | 1.42% | −1,120 | R+ 4.56% | 24,550 |
| Stoddard | 9,172 | 69.16% | 3,899 | 29.40% | 191 | 1.44% | −5,273 | R+ 39.76% | 13,262 |
| Taney* | 2,138 | 67.62% | 979 | 30.96% | 45 | 1.42% | −1,159 | R+ 36.66% | 3,162 |
| Texas | 7,215 | 66.49% | 3,410 | 31.43% | 226 | 2.08% | −3,805 | R+ 35.06% | 10,851 |
| Washington | 4,706 | 48.95% | 4,711 | 49.00% | 197 | 2.05% | −5 | D+ 0.05% | 9,614 |
| Wayne | 3,784 | 61.49% | 2,243 | 36.45% | 127 | 2.06% | −1,541 | R+ 25.04% | 6,154 |
| Wright | 5,784 | 67.94% | 2,557 | 30.03% | 173 | 2.03% | −3,227 | R+ 37.91% | 8,514 |
| District Total | 174,564 | 61.92% | 102,682 | 36.42% | 4,688 | 1.66% | 71,882 | R+ 25.50% | 281,934 |

- These numbers reflect only the eastern sections of Taney County that were included in the 8th Congressional District.

==== 2012 ====
| County | Mitt Romney | % | Barack Obama | % | Others | % | Margin | % | Total |
|---|---|---|---|---|---|---|---|---|---|
| Bollinger | 4,095 | 75.05% | 1,213 | 22.23% | 148 | 2.72% | −2,882 | R+ 52.82% | 5,456 |
| Butler | 12,248 | 72.52% | 4,363 | 25.83% | 278 | 1.65% | −7,885 | R+ 46.69% | 16,889 |
| Cape Girardeau | 25,370 | 70.81% | 9,728 | 27.15% | 731 | 2.04% | −15,642 | R+ 43.66% | 35,829 |
| Carter | 1,978 | 70.67% | 754 | 26.94% | 67 | 2.39% | −1,224 | R+ 43.73% | 2,799 |
| Crawford | 6,434 | 67.17% | 2,951 | 30.81% | 194 | 2.03% | −3,483 | R+ 36.36% | 9,579 |
| Dent | 4,883 | 73.51% | 1,585 | 23.86% | 175 | 2.63% | −3,298 | R+ 49.65% | 6,671 |
| Douglas | 4,649 | 70.90% | 1,710 | 26.08% | 198 | 3.02% | −2,939 | R+ 44.82% | 6,557 |
| Dunklin | 6,850 | 64.31% | 3,636 | 34.14% | 165 | 1.55% | −3,214 | R+ 30.17% | 10,651 |
| Howell | 11,544 | 70.62% | 4,395 | 26.89% | 407 | 2.49% | −7,149 | R+ 43.73% | 16,346 |
| Iron | 2,252 | 55.87% | 1,669 | 41.40% | 110 | 2.73% | −583 | R+ 14.47% | 4,031 |
| Jefferson* | 14,608 | 55.18% | 11,277 | 42.59% | 591 | 2.23% | −3,331 | R+ 12.59% | 26,476 |
| Madison | 3,227 | 65.46% | 1,588 | 32.21% | 115 | 2.33% | −1,639 | R+ 33.25% | 4,930 |
| Mississippi | 2,997 | 60.91% | 1,858 | 37.76% | 65 | 1.33% | −1,139 | R+ 23.15% | 4,920 |
| New Madrid | 4,284 | 59.09% | 2,814 | 38.81% | 152 | 2.10% | −1,470 | R+ 20.28% | 7,250 |
| Oregon | 2,886 | 65.28% | 1,419 | 32.10% | 116 | 2.62% | −1,467 | R+ 33.18% | 4,421 |
| Ozark | 3,080 | 69.17% | 1,261 | 28.32% | 112 | 2.51% | −1,819 | R+ 40.85% | 4,453 |
| Pemiscot | 3,598 | 56.80% | 2,671 | 42.16% | 66 | 1.04% | −927 | R+ 14.64% | 6,335 |
| Perry | 5,669 | 70.98% | 2,184 | 27.34% | 134 | 1.68% | −3,485 | R+ 43.64% | 7,987 |
| Phelps | 11,895 | 65.05% | 5,798 | 31.71% | 593 | 3.24% | −6,097 | R+ 33.34% | 18,286 |
| Reynolds | 1,931 | 60.31% | 1,157 | 36.13% | 114 | 3.56% | −774 | R+ 24.18% | 3,202 |
| Ripley | 3,743 | 71.12% | 1,396 | 26.52% | 124 | 2.36% | −2,347 | R+ 44.60% | 5,263 |
| Scott | 11,623 | 68.37% | 5,122 | 30.13% | 254 | 1.50% | −6,501 | R+ 38.24% | 16,999 |
| Shannon | 2,262 | 61.27% | 1,302 | 35.27% | 128 | 3.46% | −960 | R+ 26.00% | 3,692 |
| St. Francois | 13,248 | 58.67% | 8,829 | 39.10% | 505 | 2.23% | −4,419 | R+ 19.57% | 22,705 |
| Ste. Genevieve | 4,055 | 50.25% | 3,813 | 47.25% | 202 | 2.50% | −242 | R+ 3.00% | 8,070 |
| Stoddard | 9,496 | 73.81% | 3,153 | 24.51% | 217 | 1.68% | −6,343 | R+ 49.30% | 12,866 |
| Texas | 7,618 | 70.77% | 2,871 | 26.67% | 275 | 2.56% | −4,747 | R+ 44.10% | 10,764 |
| Washington | 5,071 | 58.32% | 3,417 | 39.30% | 207 | 2.38% | −1,654 | R+ 19.02% | 8,695 |
| Wayne | 3,790 | 66.26% | 1,813 | 31.70% | 117 | 2.04% | −1,977 | R+ 34.56% | 5,720 |
| Wright | 5,830 | 73.29% | 1,953 | 24.55% | 172 | 2.16% | −3,877 | R+ 48.74% | 7,955 |
| District Total | 201,214 | 65.88% | 97,700 | 31.99% | 6,523 | 2.13% | 103,514 | R+ 33.89% | 305,437 |

- These numbers reflect only the western and southern sections of Jefferson County that are included in the 8th Congressional District.

==== 2008 Democratic presidential primary ====
| County | Hillary Clinton | % | Barack Obama | % | John Edwards | % | Others | % | Margin | % | Total |
|---|---|---|---|---|---|---|---|---|---|---|---|
| Bollinger | 971 | 74.12% | 293 | 22.37% | 38 | 2.90% | 8 | 0.61% | −678 | C+ 51.75% | 1,310 |
| Butler | 2,490 | 69.87% | 960 | 26.94% | 82 | 2.30% | 32 | 0.90% | −1,530 | C+ 42.93% | 3,564 |
| Cape Girardeau | 4,510 | 56.55% | 3,145 | 39.44% | 247 | 3.10% | 73 | 0.92% | −1,365 | C+ 17.11% | 7,975 |
| Carter | 541 | 75.24% | 137 | 19.05% | 32 | 4.45% | 5 | 0.70% | −404 | C+ 56.19% | 719 |
| Dent | 962 | 62.23% | 493 | 31.89% | 74 | 4.79% | 17 | 1.10% | −469 | C+ 30.34% | 1,546 |
| Douglas | 827 | 62.32% | 454 | 34.21% | 39 | 2.94% | 7 | 0.53% | −373 | C+ 28.11% | 1,327 |
| Dunklin | 2,587 | 78.44% | 604 | 18.31% | 69 | 2.09% | 38 | 1.15% | −1,983 | C+ 60.13% | 3,298 |
| Howell | 2,307 | 64.07% | 1,168 | 32.44% | 99 | 2.75% | 27 | 0.75% | −1,139 | C+ 31.63% | 3,601 |
| Iron | 1,180 | 70.53% | 406 | 24.27% | 72 | 4.30% | 15 | 0.90% | −774 | C+ 46.26% | 1,673 |
| Madison | 971 | 68.72% | 344 | 24.35% | 64 | 4.53% | 34 | 2.40% | −627 | C+ 44.37% | 1,413 |
| Mississippi | 1,094 | 65.43% | 502 | 30.02% | 57 | 3.41% | 19 | 1.14% | −592 | C+ 35.41% | 1,672 |
| New Madrid | 1,801 | 71.19% | 610 | 24.11% | 101 | 3.99% | 18 | 0.71% | −1,191 | C+ 47.08% | 2,530 |
| Oregon | 989 | 71.77% | 332 | 24.09% | 42 | 3.05% | 15 | 1.09% | −657 | C+ 47.68% | 1,378 |
| Ozark | 689 | 65.62% | 332 | 31.62% | 18 | 1.71% | 11 | 1.05% | −357 | C+ 34.00% | 1,050 |
| Pemiscot | 1,270 | 70.83% | 466 | 25.99% | 34 | 1.90% | 23 | 1.28% | −804 | C+ 44.84% | 1,793 |
| Perry | 1,180 | 61.24% | 650 | 33.73% | 81 | 4.20% | 16 | 0.83% | −530 | C+ 27.51% | 1,927 |
| Phelps | 2,392 | 53.93% | 1,878 | 42.34% | 122 | 2.75% | 43 | 0.97% | −514 | C+ 11.59% | 4,435 |
| Reynolds | 741 | 66.22% | 277 | 24.75% | 70 | 6.26% | 31 | 2.77% | −464 | C+ 41.47% | 1,119 |
| Ripley | 1,073 | 74.20% | 282 | 19.50% | 72 | 4.98% | 19 | 1.31% | −791 | C+ 54.70% | 1,446 |
| Scott | 2,931 | 63.43% | 1,443 | 31.23% | 191 | 4.13% | 56 | 1.22% | −1,488 | C+ 32.20% | 4,621 |
| Shannon | 914 | 69.72% | 323 | 24.64% | 50 | 3.81% | 24 | 1.83% | −591 | C+ 45.08% | 1,311 |
| St. Francois | 5,418 | 70.25% | 1,993 | 25.84% | 224 | 2.90% | 78 | 1.01% | −3,425 | C+ 44.41% | 7,713 |
| Stoddard | 2,225 | 72.95% | 684 | 22.43% | 112 | 3.67% | 29 | 0.95% | −1,541 | C+ 50.52% | 3,050 |
| Taney* | 1,219 | 62.51% | 674 | 34.56% | 39 | 2.00% | 18 | 0.92% | −545 | C+ 27.95% | 1,950 |
| Texas | 1,858 | 68.03% | 743 | 27.21% | 101 | 3.70% | 29 | 1.06% | −1,115 | C+ 40.82% | 2,731 |
| Washington | 2,345 | 74.63% | 670 | 21.32% | 100 | 3.18% | 27 | 0.86% | −1,675 | C+ 53.31% | 3,142 |
| Wayne | 1,458 | 75.94% | 359 | 18.70% | 71 | 3.70% | 32 | 1.66% | −1,099 | C+ 57.24% | 1,920 |
| Wright | 1,143 | 69.48% | 452 | 27.48% | 36 | 2.19% | 14 | 0.85% | −691 | C+ 42.00% | 1,645 |
| District Total | 48,086 | 66.92% | 20,674 | 28.77% | 2,337 | 3.25% | 762 | 1.06% | 27,412 | C+ 38.15% | 71,859 |

- These numbers reflect only the eastern sections of Taney County that were included in the 8th Congressional District at the time of the Missouri Democratic Presidential Primary on Super Tuesday, February 5, 2008.

==== 2008 Republican presidential primary ====
| County | Mike Huckabee | % | John McCain | % | Mitt Romney | % | Ron Paul | % | Others | % | Margin | % | Total |
|---|---|---|---|---|---|---|---|---|---|---|---|---|---|
| Bollinger | 657 | 39.72% | 518 | 31.32% | 384 | 23.22% | 65 | 3.93% | 30 | 1.81% | −139 | H+ 8.04% | 1,654 |
| Butler | 2,215 | 48.85% | 1,117 | 24.64% | 1,007 | 22.21% | 134 | 2.96% | 61 | 1.35% | −1,098 | H+ 24.21% | 4,534 |
| Cape Girardeau | 3,068 | 27.63% | 3,528 | 31.77% | 3,922 | 35.32% | 361 | 3.25% | 226 | 2.04% | −394 | R+ 3.55% | 11,105 |
| Carter | 373 | 52.39% | 202 | 28.37% | 107 | 15.03% | 24 | 3.37% | 6 | 0.84% | −171 | H+ 24.02% | 712 |
| Dent | 959 | 48.78% | 442 | 22.48% | 411 | 20.91% | 127 | 6.46% | 27 | 1.37% | −517 | H+ 26.30% | 1,966 |
| Douglas | 1,343 | 55.04% | 516 | 21.15% | 270 | 11.07% | 295 | 12.09% | 16 | 0.66% | −827 | H+ 33.89% | 2,440 |
| Dunklin | 1,309 | 58.52% | 480 | 21.46% | 381 | 17.03% | 36 | 1.61% | 31 | 1.39% | −829 | H+ 37.06% | 2,237 |
| Howell | 2,882 | 52.97% | 1,347 | 24.76% | 793 | 14.57% | 356 | 6.54% | 63 | 1.16% | −1,535 | H+ 28.21% | 5,441 |
| Iron | 354 | 43.17% | 269 | 32.80% | 138 | 16.83% | 43 | 5.24% | 16 | 1.95% | −85 | H+ 10.37% | 820 |
| Madison | 560 | 43.96% | 452 | 35.48% | 185 | 14.52% | 51 | 4.00% | 26 | 2.04% | −108 | H+ 8.48% | 1,274 |
| Mississippi | 471 | 42.59% | 373 | 33.73% | 226 | 20.43% | 15 | 1.36% | 21 | 1.90% | −98 | H+ 8.86% | 1,106 |
| New Madrid | 656 | 48.74% | 386 | 28.68% | 250 | 18.57% | 43 | 3.19% | 11 | 0.82% | −270 | H+ 20.06% | 1,346 |
| Oregon | 696 | 58.88% | 242 | 20.47% | 134 | 11.34% | 101 | 8.54% | 9 | 0.76% | −454 | H+ 38.41% | 1,182 |
| Ozark | 766 | 48.09% | 428 | 26.87% | 235 | 14.75% | 149 | 9.35% | 15 | 0.94% | −338 | H+ 21.22% | 1,593 |
| Pemiscot | 565 | 57.59% | 233 | 23.75% | 149 | 15.19% | 20 | 2.04% | 14 | 1.43% | −332 | H+ 33.84% | 981 |
| Perry | 575 | 25.76% | 973 | 43.59% | 542 | 24.28% | 96 | 4.30% | 46 | 2.06% | −398 | M+ 17.83% | 2,232 |
| Phelps | 1,728 | 35.15% | 1,459 | 29.68% | 1,340 | 27.26% | 321 | 6.53% | 68 | 1.38% | −269 | H+ 5.47% | 4,916 |
| Reynolds | 283 | 46.09% | 202 | 32.90% | 93 | 15.15% | 25 | 4.07% | 11 | 1.79% | −81 | H+ 13.19% | 614 |
| Ripley | 750 | 53.84% | 329 | 23.62% | 238 | 17.09% | 52 | 3.73% | 24 | 1.72% | −421 | H+ 30.22% | 1,393 |
| Scott | 1,549 | 36.79% | 1,389 | 32.99% | 1,076 | 25.56% | 113 | 2.68% | 83 | 1.97% | −160 | H+ 3.80% | 4,210 |
| Shannon | 515 | 54.44% | 223 | 23.57% | 83 | 8.77% | 109 | 11.52% | 16 | 1.69% | −292 | H+ 30.87% | 946 |
| St. Francois | 1,631 | 35.90% | 1,727 | 38.01% | 949 | 20.89% | 134 | 2.95% | 102 | 2.25% | −96 | M+ 2.11% | 4,543 |
| Stoddard | 1,571 | 50.56% | 772 | 24.85% | 643 | 20.70% | 91 | 2.93% | 30 | 0.97% | −799 | H+ 25.71% | 3,107 |
| Taney* | 1,821 | 55.89% | 844 | 25.91% | 462 | 14.18% | 92 | 2.82% | 40 | 1.23% | −977 | H+ 29.98% | 3,258 |
| Texas | 1,727 | 50.13% | 954 | 27.69% | 480 | 13.93% | 234 | 6.79% | 50 | 1.45% | −773 | H+ 22.44% | 3,445 |
| Washington | 622 | 38.73% | 616 | 38.36% | 297 | 18.49% | 50 | 3.11% | 21 | 1.31% | −6 | H+ 0.37% | 1,606 |
| Wayne | 740 | 45.20% | 499 | 30.48% | 323 | 19.73% | 46 | 2.81% | 29 | 1.77% | −241 | H+ 14.72% | 1,637 |
| Wright | 1,878 | 59.64% | 746 | 23.69% | 298 | 9.46% | 178 | 5.65% | 49 | 1.56% | −1,132 | H+ 35.95% | 3,149 |
| District Total | 32,264 | 43.93% | 21,266 | 28.95% | 15,416 | 20.99% | 3,361 | 4.58% | 1,141 | 1.55% | 10,998 | H+ 14.98% | 73,447 |

- These numbers reflect only the eastern sections of Taney County that were included in the 8th Congressional District at the time of the Missouri Republican Presidential Primary on Super Tuesday, February 5, 2008.

== See also ==
- Missouri's congressional districts
- List of United States congressional districts
- Missouri's 8th congressional district special election, 2013
- 2012 House of Representatives election in Missouri 8th district
