= Abram Comingo =

American politician (1820–1889)

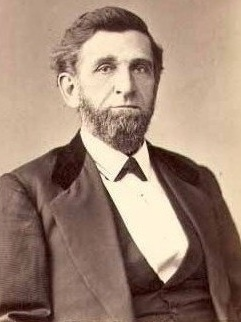

Member of the U.S. House of Representatives from Missouri
- In office March 4, 1871 – March 3, 1875
- Preceded by: Robert T. Van Horn
- Succeeded by: Benjamin Joseph Franklin
- Constituency: 6th district (1871–1873); 8th district (1873–1875)

Personal details
- Born: January 9, 1820 Mercer County, Kentucky, U.S.
- Died: November 10, 1889 (aged 69)
- Resting place: Elmwood Cemetery, Kansas City, Missouri
- Party: Democratic

Abram Comingo (January 9, 1820 – November 10, 1889) was a Democratic Representative representing Missouri from March 4, 1871 – March 4, 1875. He was a slaveholder.

Comingo was born near Harrodsburg, Kentucky in Mercer County, Kentucky. He graduated from Centre College in Danville, Kentucky and was admitted to the bar in 1847.

He moved to Independence, Missouri in 1848, was delegate to the Missouri State convention in February 1861 which decided that Missouri would remain in the Union in the American Civil War; appointed provost marshal of the sixth district of Missouri in May 1863; elected recorder of deeds of Jackson County, Missouri in 1868.

After two terms in Congress he did not stand for re-election. He was appointed by Ulysses S. Grant to a commission to arbitrate Sioux land claims in Dakota Territory in 1876. He moved to Kansas City, Missouri in 1881 and was buried in Elmwood Cemetery there.

U.S. House of Representatives
| Preceded by Robert T. Van Horn | Member of the U.S. House of Representatives from Missouri's 6th congressional district 1871–1873 | Succeeded by Harrison E. Havens |
| Preceded by James G. Blair | Member of the U.S. House of Representatives from Missouri's 8th congressional district 1873–1875 | Succeeded by Benjamin Joseph Franklin |
