= Perl D. Decker =

American politician (1875–1934)

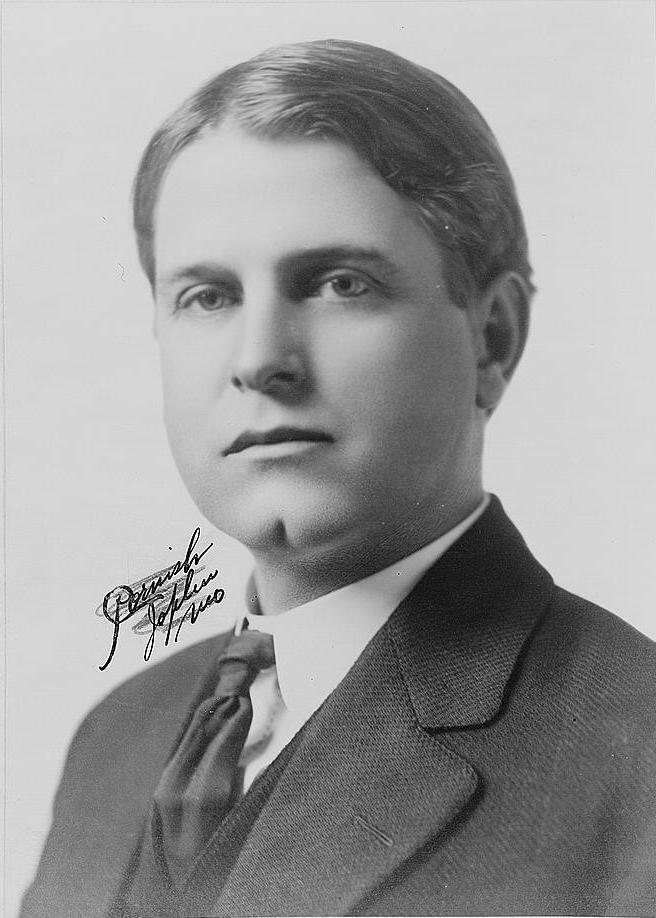
- Decker c. 1912

Member of the U.S. House of Representatives from Missouri's 15th district
- In office March 4, 1913 – March 3, 1919
- Preceded by: James A. Daugherty
- Succeeded by: Isaac V. McPherson

Personal details
- Born: September 10, 1875 near Coolville, Ohio, U.S.
- Died: August 22, 1934 (aged 58) Kansas City, Missouri, U.S.
- Resting place: Mount Hope Cemetery, Joplin, Missouri, U.S.
- Party: Democratic
- Spouse: Bertha Greer
- Children: 1
- Profession: Politician, lawyer

Perl D. Decker (September 10, 1875 – August 22, 1934) was a U.S. Representative from Missouri.

Born on a farm near Coolville, Ohio, Decker moved with his parents to a farm near Hollis, Kansas, in 1879. He attended the public schools of Cloud County, and Park College, Parkville, Missouri, from which he graduated in 1897. He graduated with a degree in law from the University of Kansas at Lawrence in 1899. He was admitted to the bar in 1900 and commenced practice at Joplin, Missouri. He served as city attorney in Joplin from 1900 to 1902.

Decker was elected as a Democrat to the 63rd, 64th, and 65th meetings of the U.S. Congress (March 4, 1913 – March 3, 1919). On April 5, 1917, he was one of 50 representatives who voted against declaring war on Germany. He was an unsuccessful candidate for reelection in 1918 to the 66th Congress, and so returned to practicing law in Joplin. He returned briefly to politics later in life, serving as a delegate to the Democratic National Convention in 1932. Decker died in Kansas City, Missouri, August 22, 1934 and was interred in Mount Hope Cemetery in Joplin.

U.S. House of Representatives
Preceded by James A. Daugherty	Member of the U.S. House of Representatives from Missouri's 15th congressional district 1913–1919	Succeeded by Isaac V. McPherson
