= Benjamin, Missouri =

Unincorporated community in Missouri

Coordinates: 40°09′43″N 91°38′04″W

Benjamin is an unincorporated community in Lewis County, in the U.S. state of Missouri.

== History ==
A post office called Benjamin was established in 1869, and remained in operation until 1926. The community has the name of John F. Benjamin, a state legislator.
