= John F. Benjamin =

American politician

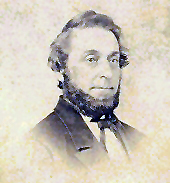

Member of the U.S. House of Representatives from Missouri's 8th district
- In office March 4, 1865 – March 4, 1871
- Preceded by: William Augustus Hall
- Succeeded by: James G. Blair

Member of the Missouri House of Representatives
- In office 1850-1852

Personal details
- Born: January 23, 1817 Cicero, New York, US
- Died: March 8, 1877 (aged 60) Washington, D.C., US
- Party: Republican
- Profession: lawyer

John Forbes Benjamin (January 23, 1817 – March 8, 1877) was a U.S. Representative from Missouri.

Born in Cicero, New York, Benjamin attended the public schools. He moved to Texas in 1845 and to Missouri in 1848. He studied law. He was admitted to the bar and commenced practice in Shelbyville, Missouri, in 1848. He served as Democratic member of the Missouri House of Representatives 1850–1852. He served as presidential elector on the Democratic ticket of in 1856. He entered the Union Army as a private in 1861 and was subsequently promoted to the ranks of captain, major, lieutenant colonel, and brevet brigadier general. Provost marshal of the Eighth District of Missouri in 1863 and 1864. He served as delegate to the Republican National Convention in 1864.

Benjamin was elected as a Republican to the Thirty-ninth, Fortieth, and Forty-first Congresses (March 4, 1865 – March 4, 1871). He served as chairman of the Committee on Invalid Expenditures (Forty-first Congress). He was not a candidate for renomination in 1870. He resumed the practice of law in Shelbyville. He was an unsuccessful candidate for election in 1872 to the Forty-third Congress. He moved to Washington, D.C., in 1874 and engaged in banking. He died in Washington, D.C., March 8, 1877. He was interred in a private cemetery at Shelbina, Missouri.

Benjamin is the namesake of the community of Benjamin, Missouri.

U.S. House of Representatives
Preceded by William Augustus Hall	Member of the U.S. House of Representatives from Missouri's 8th congressional district 1865–1871	Succeeded by James G. Blair
