= Charles G. Burton =

American politician (1846–1926)

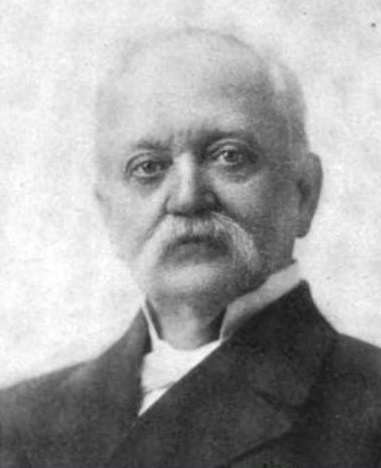
- From Volume 2 of 1908's Kansas City, Missouri: Its History and Its People 1808-1908 by Carrie Westlake Whitney

Member of the U.S. House of Representatives from Missouri's 15th district
- In office March 4, 1895 – March 3, 1897
- Preceded by: Charles H. Morgan
- Succeeded by: Maecenas E. Benton

Personal details
- Born: Charles Germman Burton; April 4, 1846 Cleveland, Ohio, U.S.
- Died: February 25, 1926 (aged 79) Kansas City, Missouri, U.S.
- Party: Republican
- Occupation: Politician, attorney, judge

Charles Germman Burton (April 4, 1846 – February 25, 1926) was a U.S. Representative from Missouri.

== Biography ==
Born in Cleveland, Ohio, Burton moved to Warren, Ohio, and attended the public schools. He enlisted September 7, 1861 as a private in Company C, 19th Ohio Infantry, and served with the regiment until discharged October 29, 1862. Corporal in Company A, 171st Ohio Infantry, during the "one hundred days" campaign of 1864. He studied law. He was admitted to the bar in Warren, Ohio, in 1867. He moved to Virgil City, Missouri, in 1868, to Erie, Kansas, in 1869, and Nevada, Vernon County, Missouri, in 1871, where he practiced law. Circuit attorney and judge of the twenty-fifth circuit. He served as delegate to the Republican National Conventions in 1884 and 1904.

Burton was elected as a Republican to the Fifty-fourth Congress (March 4, 1895 – March 3, 1897). He was an unsuccessful candidate for reelection in 1896 to the Fifty-fifth Congress. He resumed the practice of law. He served as collector of internal revenue at Kansas City, Missouri from 1907 to 1915. Commander in chief of the Grand Army of the Republic in 1908. He died in Kansas City, Missouri, February 25, 1926. He was interred in Deepwood Cemetery, Nevada, Missouri.

U.S. House of Representatives
Preceded by Charles H. Morgan	Member of the U.S. House of Representatives from Missouri's 15th congressional district 1895–1897	Succeeded by Maecenas E. Benton
