= Edward Kent Jr. =

American jurist (1862–1916)

Edward Kent
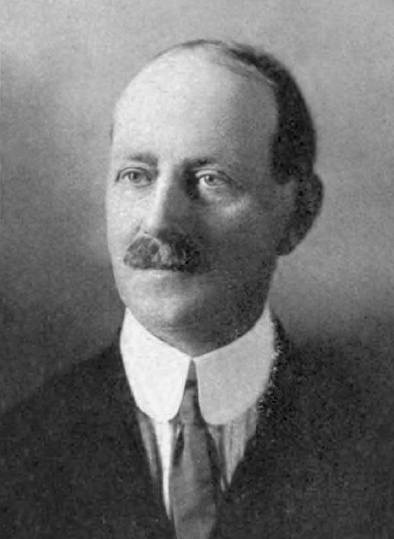

Chief Justice, Arizona Territorial Supreme Court
- In office March 21, 1902 – February 14, 1912
- Nominated by: Theodore Roosevelt (1902, 1906); William Howard Taft (1910)
- Preceded by: Webster Street
- Succeeded by: Alfred Franklin (Arizona Supreme Court)

Personal details
- Born: August 8, 1862 Lynn, Massachusetts
- Died: July 30, 1916 (aged 53) Chicago, Illinois
- Party: Republican
- Spouse: Edith Chadwick
- Profession: Attorney

Edward Kent Jr. (August 8, 1862 – July 30, 1916) was an American jurist and the final Chief Justice of the Arizona Territorial Supreme Court. He began his legal career in New York City and worked there for several years before health concerns caused him to move to Denver, Colorado. After serving briefly as an Assistant United States Attorney, Kent was appointed to the Arizona Territorial bench. His most influential decision came in 1910 when he determined the water rights for roughly 5,000 land owners in the Salt River Valley.

== Background ==
Kent was born on August 8, 1862, in Lynn, Massachusetts, to Abigail (Rockwood) and Edward Kent. His father was Mayor of Bangor, Maine, then Governor of Maine, and eventually a Justice of the Maine Supreme Judicial Court. His early education occurred at Adams Academy in Quincy, Massachusetts. He then attended Harvard University, from which he received a Bachelor of Arts in 1883, and Columbia University, from which he received a Bachelor of Laws in 1887.

After his admission to the New York bar in 1887, Kent began practicing law in New York City. In 1893, Kent became an associate at the prestigious legal firm of Butler, Stillman & Hubbard. On September 14 the same year he married Edith Chadwick of Baltimore, Maryland. Kent's bride suffered a physical and mental breakdown before the end of the year and needed to be institutionalized for the rest of her life.

Kent was diagnosed with tuberculosis and moved to Denver, Colorado, for health reasons in 1897. In addition to his legal practice, he made an unsuccessful run for a seat in the Colorado House of Representatives in 1900. In 1901, Kent became an Assistant United States Attorney.

At the time of Kent's appointment to the Arizona bench, President Theodore Roosevelt wanted to appoint someone residing in the territory. Competing groups within the territorial Republican Party were unable to settle upon an in-territory candidate acceptable to all parties. Forced to look outside the territory, President Roosevelt nominated Kent to become Chief Justice of the Arizona Territorial Supreme Court on January 29, 1902, with senate confirmation occurring on March 3. He took his oath of office on March 21, 1902. During his time on the bench, Kent was assigned to judicial district three. At the time of his appointment the third district consisted of Maricopa and Yuma counties. In 1903, Yuma County was exchanged for Pinal County with Pinal being exchanged for Gila County two years later. Upon his arrival in Arizona Territory, Kent settled in Phoenix. Judge Kent was reappointed to additional four-year terms on February 26, 1906, by Roosevelt, and January 20, 1910, by William Howard Taft. His reappointments were confirmed by the senate on March 6, 1906 and January 25, 1910.

During his ten years on the bench, Kent authored around 70 decisions. His legal writings were coherent and straightforward, being of average size for the time. Kent's most important decision came during Hurley v. Abbott, Arizona Territorial Court, No. 4564 (March 1, 1910). The ruling, commonly known as the "Kent Decree", determined when various tracts of land were first irrigated, beginning in 1869 and working through 1909, and assigned relative water rights accordingly. The result was the settling of water rights and relative priorities for roughly 5,000 land owners in the Salt River valley.

In other rulings, Kent dealt with an attractive nuisance concern in Sallady v. Old Dominion Copper Mining Company, 12 Arizona 124 (1909) where a small girl had drowned in a water plume at one of the company's mines. Hughes v. Territory of Arizona, 11 Arizona 184 (1906) examined a criminal contempt charge that had been brought against former-Governor L. C. Hughes due to some of his newspaper publications. Thomas v. Territory of Arizona, 11 Arizona 184 (1907) meanwhile examined fraud charges brought against a man who had operated the Yavapai County hospital and poor farm. On a smaller scale, Nogales Water Company v. Neuman, 12 Arizona 306 (1909) dealt with whether a building containing both a photography store and a grocer should have one water meter or two.

As the final steps in Arizona statehood approached, Kent received the Republican nomination for a seat on the Arizona Supreme Court but was defeated by the Democratic challenger during the general election The judge left the bench when Arizona achieved statehood on February 14, 1912.

After leaving the bench, Kent went into private legal practice with Louis H. Chalmers. He was also active in civic affairs, becoming a director of the Phoenix County Club, member of the St. Luke's Hospital board of trustees, and vestryman at Trinity Episcopal Cathedral. In July 1916, Kent was traveling with his mother. While on the trip, Kent died of pneumonia on July 30, 1916, in Chicago, Illinois. He was buried at Mount Auburn Cemetery in Cambridge, Massachusetts.
