= James A. Daugherty =

American politician (1847–1920)

Member of the U.S. House of Representatives from Missouri's 15th district
- In office March 4, 1911 – March 3, 1913
- Preceded by: Charles H. Morgan
- Succeeded by: Perl D. Decker

Personal details
- Born: James Alexander Daugherty; August 30, 1847 Athens, Tennessee, U.S.
- Died: January 26, 1920 (aged 72) Carterville, Missouri, U.S.
- Resting place: Webb City Cemetery, Webb City, Missouri, U.S.
- Party: Democratic
- Relatives: Leila Denmark (niece)
- Occupation: Politician, judge

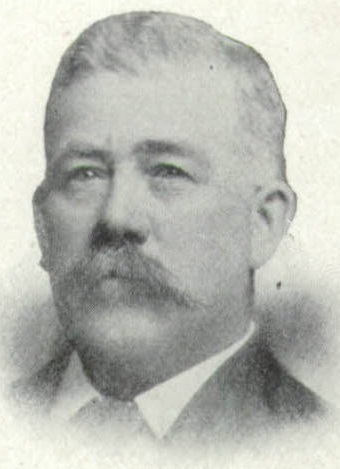
From 1912's Official Manual of the State of Missouri 1911 - 1912

James Alexander Daugherty (August 30, 1847 – January 26, 1920) was an American politician who was a Democratic U.S. Representative and state judge from southwest Missouri.

== Biography ==
Daugherty was born in Athens, McMinn County, Tennessee, August 30, 1847. He moved to Missouri with his parents, who settled near Carterville, Jasper County, in 1867. As an adult he was active in all civic enterprises of the State and county. He also worked in farming, stock raising, and mining and assisted in developing the lead and zinc fields of Missouri. From 1890 to 1892 Daugherty held the post of associate judge for the western district of Jasper County, and then became the presiding judge from 1892 to 1896.

In 1897 Daugherty became a member of the state house of representatives and was elected as a Democrat to the Sixty-second Congress (March 4, 1911 – March 3, 1913). He was an unsuccessful candidate for renomination in 1912.

Simultaneously to this, Daugherty served as president of the First National Bank of Carterville from 1907 to 1920. He was re-appointed as the presiding judge of Jasper County on May 17, 1919, and served until his death. Daugherty died in Carterville, Jasper County, Missouri, on January 26, 1920, and was interred in Webb City Cemetery, Webb City, Missouri. His large dark granite memorial stone is near the main entrance of the cemetery.

== Family ==
Daugherty's niece is pediatrician and supercentenarian Leila Denmark.

U.S. House of Representatives
| Preceded by Charles H. Morgan | Member of the U.S. House of Representatives from Missouri's 15th congressional district 1911–1913 | Succeeded by Perl D. Decker |
