= Leila Denmark =

American pediatrician (1898–2012)

- Born: Leila Alice Daughtry; February 1, 1898; Portal, Georgia, U.S.
- Died: April 1, 2012 (aged 114 years, 60 days); Athens, Georgia, U.S.
- Education: Medical College of Georgia
- Occupation: Doctor
- Known for: Co-developer of the whooping cough vaccine; medical research; supercentenarian; World's oldest active pediatrician
- Spouse: John E. Denmark (m. 1928; died 1990)
- Children: 1
- Medical career
- Institutions: Henrietta Egleston Hospital, Private practice
- Sub-specialties: Pediatrics

Leila Alice Denmark (née Daughtry; February 1, 1898 – April 1, 2012) was an American pediatrician in Atlanta, Georgia. She was the world's oldest practicing pediatrician until her retirement in May 2001 at the age of 103, after 73 years. She was a supercentenarian, living to the age of 114 years, 60 days.

A co-developer of the pertussis (whooping cough) vaccine, Denmark was one of the few supercentenarians in history to gain prominence in life for reasons other than longevity. She started treating children in 1928. By the time of her retirement, Denmark was treating grandchildren and great-grandchildren of her first patients.

== Early life and education ==
Born in Portal, Georgia, Leila Alice Daughtry was the third of 12 children of Elerbee and Alice Cornelia (Hendricks) Daughtry. Her paternal uncle was Missouri Congressman James Alexander Daugherty. She was the older sister of Clyde Daughtry, who is known for shooting the only known authentic color footage of the attack on Pearl Harbor.

Denmark attended Tift College where she trained to be a teacher, and studied Chemistry and Physics at Mercer University. She accepted a marriage proposal from John Eustace Denmark, who was soon deployed to Java, Dutch Indies by the U.S. Department of State. Because wives were forbidden from joining, Denmark decided to attend medical school. She graduated from Medical College of Georgia in 1928 as the only woman in her class, and the school's third woman ever to graduate with a medical degree.

John Eustace Denmark returned from overseas and they married on June 11, 1928, soon after she received her medical diploma. They had one child together, Mary, on November 19, 1930. Leila Denmark was a registered Democrat and a practicing Baptist.

== Medical career ==
Denmark accepted a residency at Grady Memorial Hospital in Atlanta, Georgia, and the couple moved to the Virginia-Highland neighborhood with her husband. Denmark was the first physician on staff of Henrietta Egleston Hospital, a pediatric hospital, opened on the Emory University campus. She also developed a private practice, seeing patients in a clinic at her home.

Denmark devoted a substantial amount of her professional time to charity. By 1935, she was a listed staff member at the Presbyterian Church Baby Clinic in Atlanta, while serving at Grady and maintaining a private practice. She conducted research from the 1930s, and especially from 1933 to 1944 in the diagnosis, treatment, and immunization of whooping cough, then frequently fatal to children. Denmark is credited as co-developer of the pertussis (whooping cough) vaccine, with support from Eli Lilly and Company, and Emory University. For this, she was awarded the Fisher Prize in 1935.

Denmark discussed her views on child-rearing in her book Every Child Should Have a Chance (1971). She was among the first doctors to object to adults smoking cigarettes around children, and to pregnant women using drugs. She believed that drinking cow's milk is harmful. She also recommended that children and adults should eat fresh fruit rather than drinking fruit juices, and drink only water. On March 9, 2000, the Georgia General Assembly honored Denmark in a resolution.

== Later life and death ==
Denmark wrote a second book, with Madia Bowman, titled Dr. Denmark Said It!: Advice for Mothers from America's Most Experienced Pediatrician written in 2002. She retired in 2002 when her eyesight became too weak for certain tasks, such as examining children's throats.

Denmark lived independently in her Cumming, Georgia home until age 106, when she moved in with her only child Mary Hutcherson Athens, Georgia. On February 1, 2008, Denmark celebrated her 110th birthday, becoming a supercentenarian. According to Hutcherson, Denmark's health deteriorated severely in the autumn of 2008 but later improved as she neared her 111th birthday. She died on April 1, 2012, at the age of 114 and 2 months. She was one of the few supercentenarians notable for something other than their longevity. A new Forsyth County, Georgia high school constructed 2016-2018 is located near her former home and is named after Denmark.

== Awards and honors ==
- 1935, the Fisher Award for "outstanding research in diagnosis, treatment, and immunization of whooping cough for her work on the vaccine"
- 1953, named Atlanta's Woman of the Year
- 1970, Distinguished Service Citation from Tift College as a "devout humanitarian who has invested her life in pediatric services to all families without respect to economic status, race, or national origin…. Devoted Humanitarian, Doctor par excellence, Generous Benefactor."
- 1980, Distinguished Alumni Award, Tift College
- 1980, Community Service Award, sponsored by television station WXIA, Atlanta, Georgia
- 1981, Book of Golden deeds Award, Buckhead Exchange Club, Atlanta
- 1982, Citation, Citizens of Portal, Georgia, jointly with her husband, John Eustace Denmark, for Outstanding Achievement and Service
- 1989, Shining Light Award, Atlanta Gas Light Company
- 1998, Lifetime Achievement Award, Atlanta Business Chronicle
- 2000, Georgia General Assembly passed a resolution honoring her
- 2000, Heroes, Saints and Legends Award, Wesley Woods
- 2000, Honorary doctorate, Emory University
- 2016, a new high school in Forsyth County, Georgia, to be opened in 2018, was named in her memory.
- 2019, named to the Georgia Women of Achievement hall of fame

== See also ==
- List of centenarians (medical professionals)
- 100 oldest American people ever
