= James G. Blair =

American politician

James Gorrall Blair

Member of the U.S. House of Representatives from Missouri's 8th district
- In office March 4, 1871 – March 3, 1873
- Preceded by: John F. Benjamin
- Succeeded by: Abram Comingo

Personal details
- Born: January 1, 1825 Blairville, Kentucky, US
- Died: March 1, 1904 (aged 79) Monticello, Missouri, US
- Resting place: Forest Grove Cemetery
- Party: Liberal Republican Party; Democratic
- Profession: lawyer

James Gorrall Blair (January 1, 1825 – March 1, 1904) was an American slave owner, lawyer, and politician who served one term as a U.S. representative from Missouri from 1871 to 1873.

== Early life ==
Born near Blairville, now Cynthiana, Kentucky, Blair's parents died when he was too young to remember them, and he was raised by relatives, including his maternal grandfather. He received a limited education before moving to Monticello, Missouri, in 1840, where he worked on farms. He continued his education on his own, and was elected clerk of the circuit court which included Lewis County, serving from 1848 to 1854.

Blair studied law while serving as court clerk, obtained admission to the bar in 1854, and began a practice in Canton.

== Political career ==
A Democrat during the American Civil War, Blair supported the Union and opposed secession, but was unable to serve in the military because of poor eyesight and other health issues. After the war he opposed most Reconstruction measures as being overly harsh to former supporters of the Confederacy.

Blair had opposed slavery, and supported adoption of the Thirteenth, Fourteenth, and Fifteenth Amendments, which ended slavery and guaranteed the right to vote regardless of race. Democrats in Missouri largely opposed these amendments, causing Blair to join the Republican Party.

He served as delegate to the Republican state convention in 1870.

=== Congress ===
Later that year he was elected to the U.S. House as a supporter of the Liberal Republican Party, and he served in the 42nd Congress, March 4, 1871 to March 3, 1873. During his term in Congress Blair attracted notice for introducing a bill (which did not pass) that would have legalized the polygamous marriages of Mormons in the United States, on the grounds that the children of these marriages should be considered legitimate.

=== Later career ===
Blair was not a candidate for renomination in 1872, and returned to practicing law and operating a farm in Monticello. He maintained his interest in politics and returned to the Democratic Party, after Missouri Democrats tacitly accepted the constitutional amendments that the party had previously opposed.

== Death ==
He died in Monticello on March 1, 1904, and was interred at Forest Grove Cemetery in Canton.

U.S. House of Representatives
Preceded by John F. Benjamin	Member of the U.S. House of Representatives from Missouri's 8th congressional district 1871–1873	Succeeded by Abram Comingo
