= Cassius M. Shartel =

American politician (1860–1943)

Cassius McLean Shartel
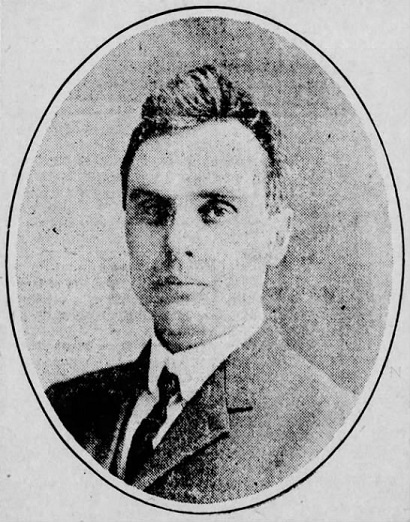
- The Daily Republican (Monongahela, Pennsylvania), February 5, 1906

Member of the U.S. House of Representatives from Missouri's 15th district
- In office March 4, 1905 – March 3, 1907
- Preceded by: Maecenas E. Benton
- Succeeded by: Thomas Hackney

Personal details
- Born: Cassius McLean Shartel; April 27, 1860 Crawford County, Pennsylvania, U.S.
- Died: September 27, 1943 (aged 83) Neosho, Missouri, U.S.
- Resting place: Odd Fellows Cemetery, Neosho, Missouri, U.S.
- Party: Republican

Cassius McLean Shartel (April 27, 1860 – September 27, 1943) was a U.S. representative from Missouri.

Born in Crawford County, Pennsylvania, Shartel moved with his parents to Knox County, Missouri, and resided there until 1873. He moved with his parents to Chautauqua County, Kansas. He attended the common schools and Kansas State Agricultural College at Manhattan. He taught school. He studied law. He was admitted to the bar in 1881 and commenced practice in Sedan, Kansas. He moved to Nevada, Missouri, in 1887 and then to Neosho, Missouri, the same year and continued the practice of law. He served as delegate to the Republican National Conventions in 1900 and 1936.

Shartel was elected as a Republican to the Fifty-ninth Congress (March 4, 1905 – March 3, 1907). He was not a candidate for renomination in 1906. He was interested in farm loans. He served as president of the Missouri constitutional convention in 1922 and 1923. He died in Neosho, Missouri, September 27, 1943. He was interred in Odd Fellows Cemetery.

U.S. House of Representatives
Preceded by Maecenas E. Benton	Member of the U.S. House of Representatives from Missouri's 15th congressional district 1905–1907	Succeeded by Thomas Hackney
