= Missouri's 15th congressional district =

Former U.S. House district

- Obsolete district
- Created: 1890
- Eliminated: 1930
- Years active: 1893-1933

The 15th congressional district of Missouri was a congressional district for the United States House of Representatives in Missouri from 1893 to 1933.

== List of members representing the district ==
Member	Party	Years	Cong ress	Electoral history
District created March 4, 1893
Charles H. Morgan (Lamar)	Democratic	March 4, 1893 – March 3, 1895	53rd	Elected in 1892. Lost renomination.
Charles G. Burton (Nevada)	Republican	March 4, 1895 – March 3, 1897	54th	Elected in 1894. Lost re-election.
Maecenas Eason Benton (Neosho)	Democratic	March 4, 1897 – March 3, 1905	55th 56th 57th 58th	Elected in 1896. Re-elected in 1898. Re-elected in 1900. Re-elected in 1902. Lost re-election.
Cassius M. Shartel (Neosho)	Republican	March 4, 1905 – March 3, 1907	59th	Elected in 1904. Retired.
Thomas Hackney (Carthage)	Democratic	March 4, 1907 – March 3, 1909	60th	Elected in 1906. Lost re-election.
Charles H. Morgan (Joplin)	Republican	March 4, 1909 – March 3, 1911	61st	Elected in 1908. Lost re-election.
James A. Daugherty (Webb City)	Democratic	March 4, 1911 – March 3, 1913	62nd	Elected in 1910. Lost renomination.
Perl D. Decker (Joplin)	Democratic	March 4, 1913 – March 3, 1919	63rd 64th 65th	Elected in 1912. Re-elected in 1914. Re-elected in 1916. Lost re-election.
Isaac V. McPherson (Aurora)	Republican	March 4, 1919 – March 3, 1923	66th 67th	Elected in 1918. Re-elected in 1920. Lost renomination.
Joe J. Manlove (Joplin)	Republican	March 4, 1923 – March 3, 1933	68th 69th 70th 71st 72nd	Elected in 1922. Re-elected in 1924. Re-elected in 1926. Re-elected in 1928; Re-elected in 1930. Redistricted to At-large district and lost re-election.
District eliminated March 3, 1933
