= Samuel L. Sawyer =

American politician

Samuel Locke Sawyer
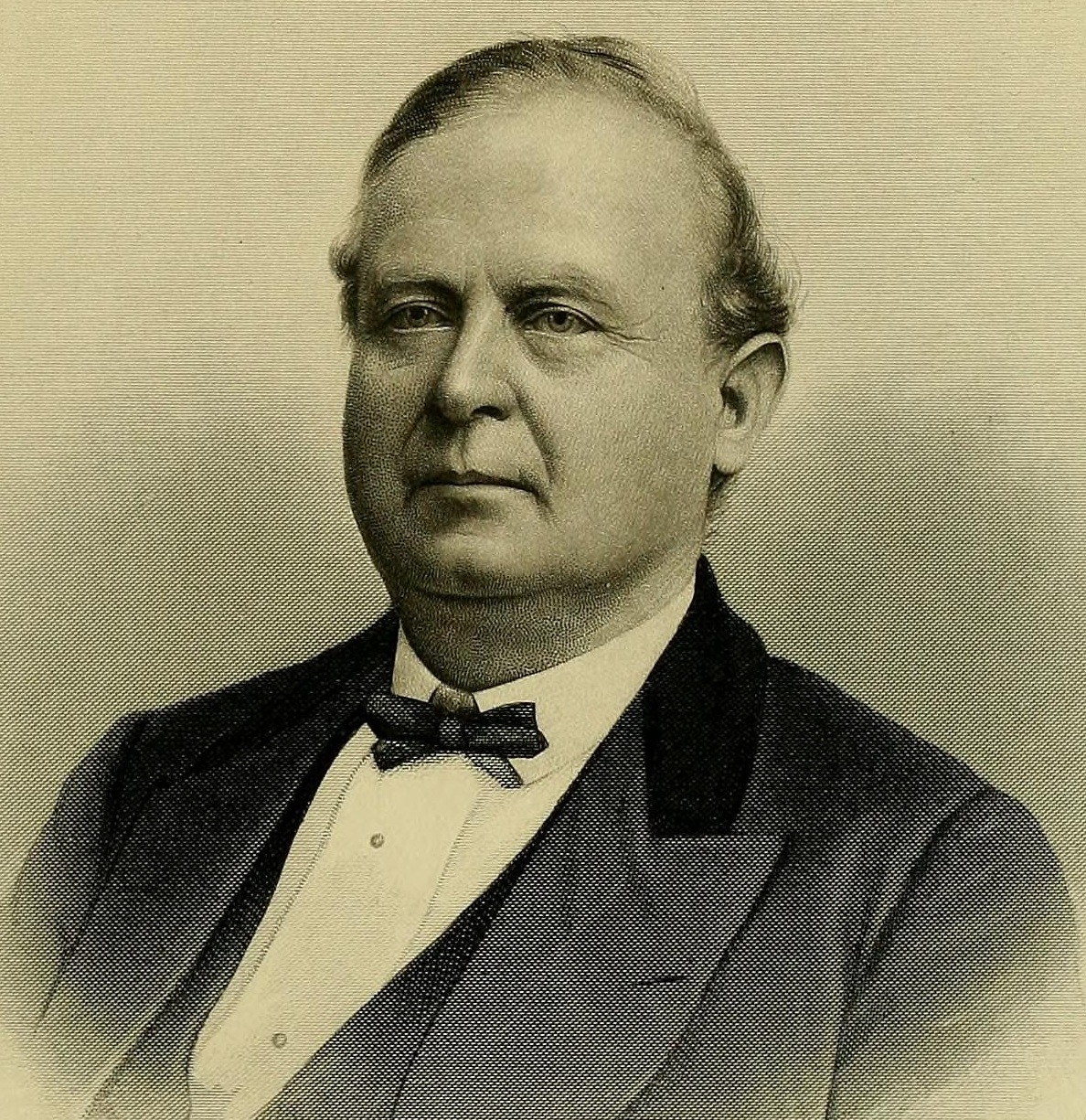

Member of the U.S. House of Representatives from Missouri's 8th district
- In office March 4, 1879 – March 3, 1881
- Preceded by: Benjamin Joseph Franklin
- Succeeded by: Robert T. Van Horn

Personal details
- Born: November 27, 1813 Mont Vernon, New Hampshire, US
- Died: March 29, 1890 (aged 76) Independence, Missouri, US
- Party: Democratic
- Profession: lawyer

Samuel Locke Sawyer (November 27, 1813 – March 29, 1890) was a U.S. representative from Missouri.

== Early life and education ==
Born in Mont Vernon, New Hampshire, Sawyer was graduated from Dartmouth College, Hanover, New Hampshire, in 1833. He studied law, and was admitted to the bar in Amherst, New Hampshire, in 1836. He moved to Lexington, Missouri, in 1838 and continued his law practice.

== Career ==
Sawyer was elected as a circuit attorney for the sixth judicial circuit of Missouri in 1848 and re-elected in 1852. He served as a delegate to the Missouri constitutional convention in 1861 and the Democratic National Democratic National Convention in 1868. He was elected as a judge of the twenty-fourth judicial circuit and served from 1871 to February 15, 1876, when he resigned.

Sawyer was elected as an Independent Democrat to the Forty-sixth Congress (March 4, 1879 – March 3, 1881). He did not seek re-election in 1880 and returned to the practice of law and engaged in banking.

== Death ==
He died in Independence, Missouri, March 29, 1890, and was interred in Woodlawn Cemetery.

U.S. House of Representatives
Preceded by Benjamin Joseph Franklin	Member of the U.S. House of Representatives from Missouri's 8th congressional district 1879–1881	Succeeded by Robert T. Van Horn
