= Webster Street =

American jurist (1846–1908)

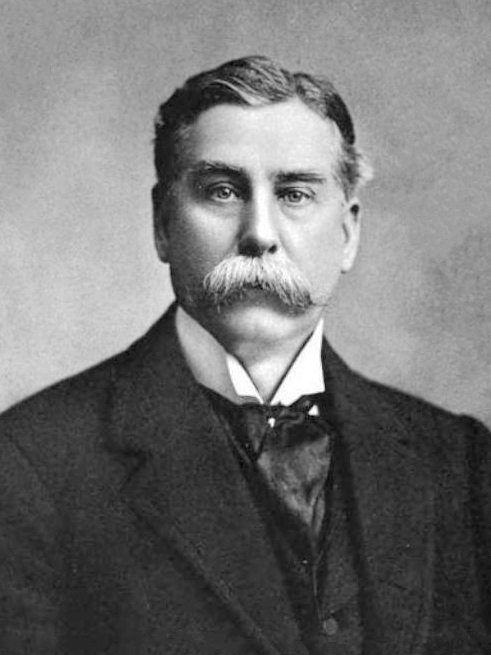

Chief Justice, Arizona Territorial Supreme Court
- In office November 15, 1897 – March 21, 1902
- Nominated by: William McKinley
- Preceded by: Hiram Truesdale
- Succeeded by: Edward Kent Jr.

Personal details
- Born: June 8, 1846 Salem, Ohio
- Died: September 21, 1908 (aged 62) Los Angeles, California
- Party: Republican
- Spouse: Mary Gilmore (m. 1869)
- Profession: Attorney

Webster Street (June 8, 1846 – September 21, 1908) was an American jurist who served as Chief Justice of the Arizona Territorial Supreme Court from 1897 till 1902.

== Early life ==
Street was born to Samuel and Sarah (Butler) Street on June 8, 1846, near Salem, Ohio. His parents were Quakers of English ancestry. The younger Street attended public schools in Salem before enrolling at Antioch College. Following graduation, he studied law under attorney Thomas Kennet and was admitted to the Ohio bar in 1871. Street married Mary Gilmore of Yellow Springs, Ohio on May 15, 1869. The union produced a son, Lawrence, and a daughter, Julia.

== Law ==
Practicing law in Leetonia, Ohio before moving to Pittsburgh, Pennsylvania, Street moved to Arizona Territory in November 1877. He operated a law office in Signal for several months until decline in the mining town prompted him to relocate to Tucson. In 1879 he moved to Tombstone. There he served one term as a county judge. Street moved to Phoenix in January 1887. There he formed a law partnership with Briggs Goodrich. Following Goodrich's death in 1888, he formed a new partnership with Benjamin Goodrich which lasted until 1890. Later partners were Frank Cox, with whom he worked with from 1891 till 1894, and Cassius M. Frazier.

Street was a member of the Ancient Order of United Workmen, Independent Order of Odd Fellows, and Knights of Pythias. He was also a Mason. Street was also active in Republican politics, being selected as the Republican nominee for Maricopa county attorney in 1890 but losing in the general election.

Street made several applications for a position on the territorial courts. His March 1889 application was blocked by Governor Lewis Wolfley on the grounds that Street had too many friends in the Democratic party. In April 1891, Street requested appointment as Chief Justice the next time the position became open. It was not until November 6, 1897, that Street's request was honored with President William McKinley appointing him to become Chief Justice. Street took his oath of office on November 15.

Writing very organized opinions, Street was one of the first judges in the territory to number the points he made in his decisions. Many cases of the day involved water rights, mining and the railroads. Street was forced to disqualify himself from a number of cases that came before the court because he had been involved in the case as an attorney before being appointed to the bench. Examples of Street's railroad related cases are Roberts v. Smith, 5 Arizona 368 (1898), which involved a dispute where the plaintiff had been ejected from a train where he believed himself to be a passenger on a freight train, and Motes v. Gila Valley, Globe and Northern Railway, 8 Arizona 50 (1902), which dealt with a minor who had been injured while carrying mail to a train. The Chief Justice also wrote opinions dealing with procedural issues. Willard v. Corrigan,8 Arizona 70 (1902) had significant procedural value in civil proceedings while ''Tanborino v. Territory of Arizona, 7 Arizona 194 (1900) is typical of issues with criminal procedure. County of Coconino v. County of Yavapai, 5 Arizona 385 (1898) came about when Coconino County was created out of Yavapai County and then refused to assume its share of railroad bonds that had been issued by Yavapai's creation. Street's decision ordering Coconino to assume its portion of the debt was later upheld on appeal to the United States Supreme Court. In other matters, the Chief Justice joined Governor N. O. Murphy and Eugene S. Ives on February 24, 1901, as speakers during dedication ceremonies for the Arizona State Capitol.

Popular in 1897, Street received widespread support for his appointment. By 1901 there was strong opposition to the judge and efforts were made to have the president remove him from office. The attacks on Street were part of an effort against all Republicans in the territorial government. President Theodore Roosevelt elected not to renominate Street but did allow him to finish his term. His successor was sworn in on March 21, 1902.

After leaving the bench, Street remained in Phoenix and practiced law. For a time he was partnered with Henry N. Alexander. In May 1908, Street was paralyzed by a stroke. He went to Los Angeles in hope the climate there would prove beneficial. Street died in L.A. on September 21, 1908. He was buried in Inglewood Park Cemetery.
