= Albert C. Baker =

American jurist (1845–1921)

Albert Baker
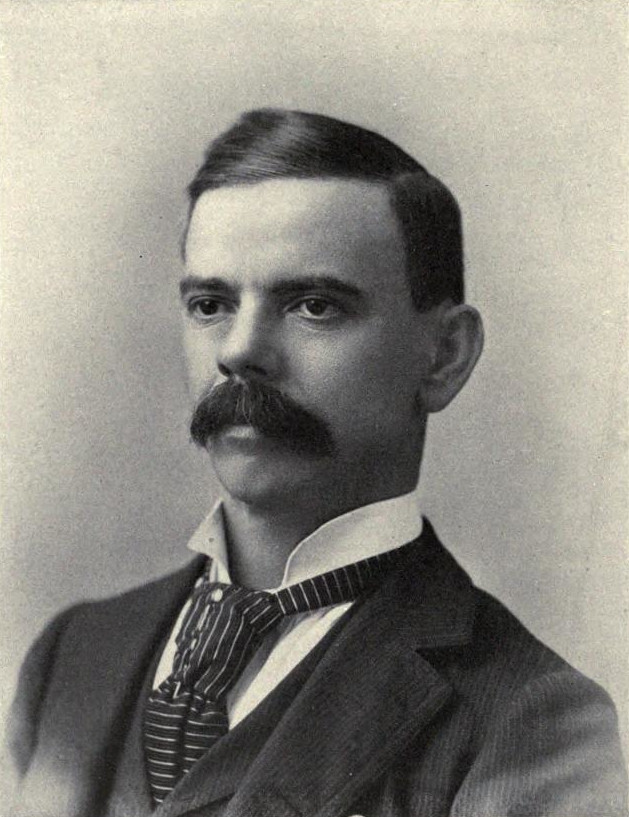

Chief Justice of the Arizona Territorial Supreme Court
- In office May 24, 1893 – July 20, 1897
- Nominated by: Grover Cleveland
- Preceded by: Henry C. Gooding
- Succeeded by: Hiram Truesdale

Justice of the Arizona Supreme Court
- In office January 4, 1919 – August 31, 1921
- Preceded by: John Wilson Ross
- Succeeded by: Edward Flanigan

Personal details
- Born: February 15, 1845 Girard, Alabama
- Died: August 31, 1921 (aged 76) Los Angeles, California
- Party: Democratic
- Spouse: Mary Jesus Alexander
- Profession: Attorney

Albert Cornelius Baker (February 15, 1845 – August 31, 1921) was an American jurist and politician who was the only person to serve on both the Arizona Territorial Supreme Court and the Arizona Supreme Court. As a judge he served four years as Chief Justice of the Supreme Court of Arizona Territory and two-and-a-half years as a justice of the Arizona Supreme Court. Politically he was a member of the Arizona Territorial Legislature and a delegate to Arizona's constitutional convention.

== Background ==
Baker was born on February 15, 1845, in Girard, Alabama, to Benjamin H. and Eliza (Greer) Baker. His father was a prominent attorney and he was educated in private schools. During the American Civil War he joined the Confederate States Army and served two-and-a-half years as color bearer for Waddell's Battalion of Artillery. While in the battalion, Baker saw action during the Siege of Vicksburg and during the Atlanta campaign from the Battle of Rocky Face Ridge to the Battle of Atlanta. Following Atlanta he spent a short time as a prisoner of war.

Following the war, Baker became a graduate of East Alabama Male College (now Auburn University). After completing school he studied law at a law office and was admitted to the bar in 1868. Baker opened his own law office in Crawford, Alabama and practiced there for three years before moving to Missouri. From Missouri he moved to San Diego, California and in 1876 arrived in Los Angeles.

In February 1879, his legal practice brought Baker to Phoenix, Arizona Territory. As he was concluding his business and preparing to return, Justice DeForest Porter requested Baker serve as special prosecutor for a Maricopa County attorney accused of malfeasance in office. After accepting and completing the assignment he began accepting additional cases and never made his planned return to California, instead making Phoenix his home for the rest of his life.

Baker was elected a member of the council (upper house) for the 11th Arizona Territorial Legislature in November 1880. During the session he served as chairman of judiciary committee. Two years later he defeated Charles Austin Tweed to become Maricopa County attorney. During the 1880s he also served four years and Phoenix city attorney and four years as Assistant United States Attorney. In 1886, Baker was a candidate for the Democratic nomination for Territorial Delegate but lost the nomination to Marcus Aurelius Smith.

On February 2, 1882, Baker married Mary Jesus Alexander in a ceremony performed by Justice Porter. The couple had four children survive to adulthood.

As a delegate to the 1892 Democratic National Convention, Baker was a supporter of Grover Cleveland. When Cleveland was elected, Baker applied to become the territory's chief justice. His support as a delegate, combined with endorsements by L. C. Hughes, Joseph Henry Kibbey, Richard Elihu Sloan, and William Henry Stilwell, resulted in a recess appointment on May 16, 1893. He took the oath of office on May 24, 1893. On top of his duties as Chief Justice, Baker was responsible Arizona Territory's third judicial district. To this was added the roles of member of board of curators for the territorial library and member of board of regents for the Arizona Normal School at Tempe (now Arizona State University).

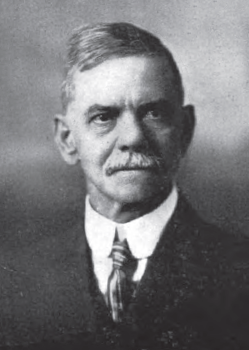
Baker around the time that Arizona reached statehood

Baker administered the oath of office to his successor on July 20, 1897, and returned to private practice. In 1899 he became president of the Territorial Bar Association, a position he held for two years. In 1910 he was elected to represent Maricopa County at Arizona's constitutional convention. At the start of the convention he served as Temporary President before the delegates could select their leaders. He was also a member of Committee on Style, Revision, and Compilation which edited the wording of the final document.

In 1918, Baker ran for election as a Justice to the Arizona Supreme Court. During the primary he defeated the incumbent, Alfred Franklin, by a vote of 14,419 to 12,275. He then won the general election with 20,721 votes to Republican candidate A.A. Jayne's 5,008 and Socialist candidate J. N. Morrison 3,688. Following his election, Baker was asked to fill the vacancy left by Justice Franklin's resignation. Baker decided to wait till the start of his own term and took the bench on January 4, 1919.

== Personal life ==
Baker died on August 31, 1921, while visiting his daughter in Los Angeles, California. His body was returned to Phoenix and buried in St. Francis Cemetery.

== See also ==
- List of Auburn University people
