= Hiram Truesdale =

American jurist (1860–1897)

Hiram Calvin Truesdale
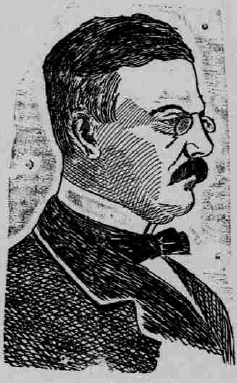

Chief Justice, Arizona Territorial Supreme Court
- In office July 20, 1897 – October 28, 1897
- Nominated by: William McKinley
- Preceded by: Albert C. Baker
- Succeeded by: Webster Street

Personal details
- Born: February 8, 1860 Rock Island, Illinois, U.S.
- Died: October 28, 1897 (aged 37) Phoenix, Arizona, U.S.
- Resting place: Lakewood Cemetery
- Party: Republican
- Spouse: Martha Langdon
- Profession: Attorney

Hiram Calvin Truesdale (February 8, 1860 – October 28, 1897) was an American jurist who served as Chief Justice of the Arizona Territorial Supreme Court from July till October 1897.

== Biography ==
Truesdale was born to Calvin and Charlotte (Haynes) Truesdale in Rock Island, Illinois on February 8, 1860. He was the brother of William Haynes Truesdale. Growing up in Rock Island, he was educated in local schools. Truesdale graduated from the State University of Iowa (now University of Iowa) in 1880 and earned a degree from the university's law school two years later. Following graduation, he was admitted to the bar in 1882 and moved to Minneapolis, Minnesota soon after. There he was in a law partnership with Thomas Lowry for a time before joining the firm of Truesdale, Lawrence, and Corrington. Around this time he married Martha Langdon, the daughter of a prominent contractor. The union produced a son and a daughter.

In 1895, Truesdale moved his family to Phoenix, Arizona Territory. The move allowed him access to the Minnesota & Arizona Construction Company's affairs, a firm in which his father-in-law owned a stake. A life-time Republican, Truesdale had been mostly politically inactive. He had however served as a delegate to the 1888 Republican National Convention and met William McKinley at that time. In his letter of application, Truesdale admitted to being largely uninformed about the appointment process and mentioned that his father had known the incoming president when they were both living in Poland, Ohio. Perhaps more influential, Truesdale secured recommendations from Russell A. Alger, fifteen United States Senators, and a variety of United States Congressmen. President McKinley nominated Truesdale to be Chief Justice of the Arizona Territorial Supreme Court on June 26, 1897. Senate confirmation came on July 8, and he was sworn in on July 20, 1897.

The new chief justice was assigned to Arizona's third judicial district, comprising Maricopa and Yuma counties. He spent his first few months as a judge in Santa Monica, California escaping Arizona's summertime heat and preparing himself for his new duties. Upon his return to Arizona, he went to Prescott to substitute for Justice Richard Elihu Sloan in a case, which would become Wiser v. Lawler, 7 Arizona 163 (1900) upon appeal, involving the sale of a group of mining properties. Truesdale's opinion, which found for the plaintiffs, was described as "one of the ablest given in the Territory."

On October 2, 1897, Truesdale underwent a minor surgical procedure to remove a growth in his nostril. While the operation initially appeared successful, complications developed two days later. The patient's health declined and his family was called to him from Minnesota. Truesdale died from meningitis complicated by typhoid on October 28, 1897. He was buried in Minneapolis' Lakewood Cemetery.
