= Benjamin J. Franklin =

American politician (1839–1898)

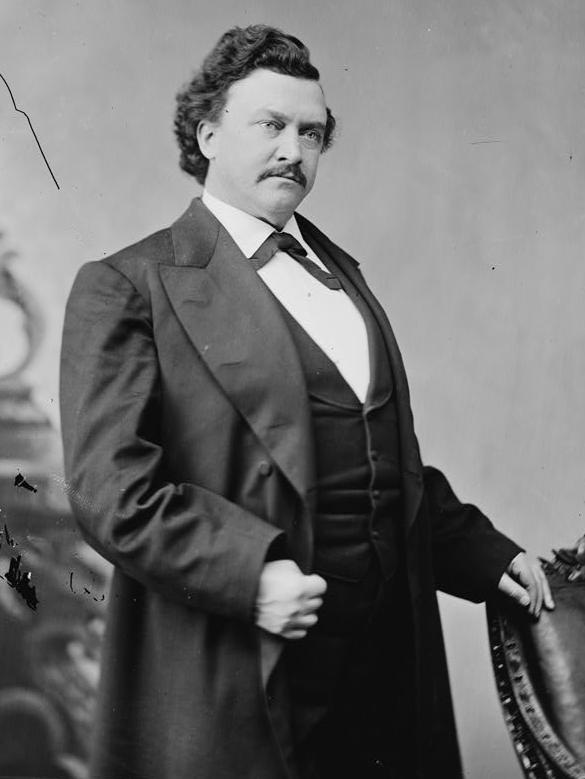

12th Governor of Arizona Territory
- In office April 18, 1896 – July 22, 1897
- Nominated by: Grover Cleveland
- Preceded by: L. C. Hughes
- Succeeded by: Myron H. McCord

Member of the U.S. House of Representatives from Missouri's 8th district
- In office March 4, 1875 – March 4, 1879
- Preceded by: Abram Comingo
- Succeeded by: Samuel Locke Sawyer

Personal details
- Born: Benjamin Joseph Franklin; March 1839 Maysville, Kentucky, U.S.
- Died: May 19, 1898 (aged 59) Phoenix, Arizona Territory, U.S.
- Party: Democratic

Benjamin Joseph Franklin (March 1839 – May 19, 1898) was a U.S. representative from Missouri, and territorial governor of Arizona.

Born in Maysville, Kentucky, in March 1839, Franklin attended private schools, and Bethany College, Bethany, Virginia (now West Virginia) from 1849 to 1851. He taught school. He studied law. He was admitted to the bar in 1859 and commenced practice in Leavenworth, Kansas.

Franklin was elected to the State senate of Kansas in 1861, but due to the outbreak of the Civil War never served. He entered the Confederate States Army as a private. He was promoted to the rank of captain and served throughout the Civil War. He moved to Columbia, Missouri, and engaged in agricultural pursuits. He moved to Kansas City, Missouri, in 1868 and resumed the practice of law. He served as prosecuting attorney for Jackson County, Missouri from 1871 to 1875.

Franklin was elected as a Democrat to the Forty-fourth and Forty-fifth Congresses (March 4, 1875 – March 4, 1879). He served as chairman of the Committee on Territories (Forty-fifth Congress). He was a candidate for renomination, but withdrew. He again engaged in the practice of law in Kansas City, Missouri. He was appointed United States consul at Hankow, China, in 1885. He returned to the United States in 1890 and settled in Phoenix, Arizona, and engaged in the practice of law. He was appointed Governor of the Territory of Arizona and served from April 18, 1896, to July 29, 1897. He died in Phoenix, Arizona, May 19, 1898. He was interred in Rosedale Cemetery, a section of the Pioneer and Military Memorial Park in Phoenix.

== See also ==
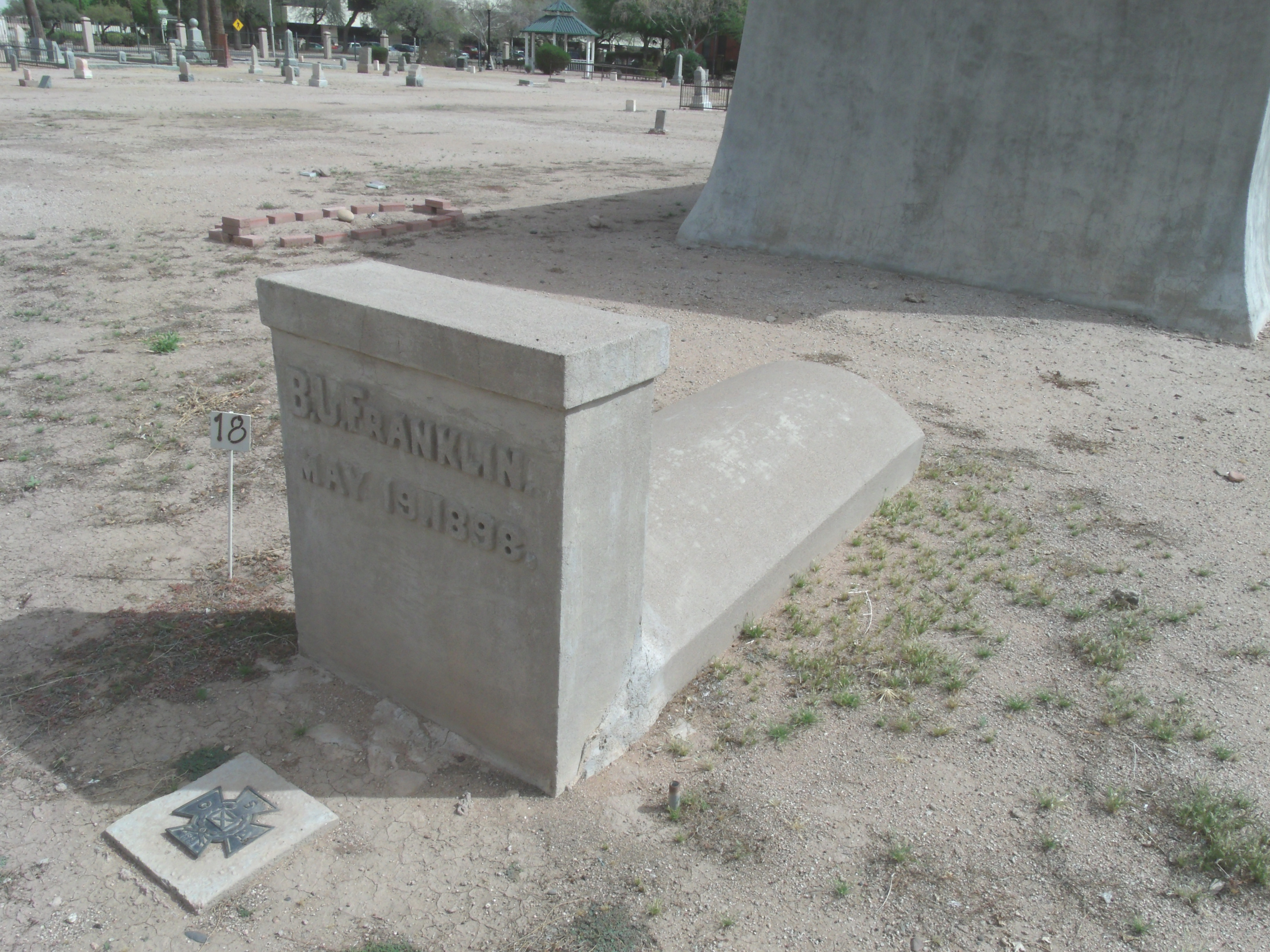
Grave site of Benjamin Joseph Franklin Franklin located in the "Rosedale Cemetery" section of Phoenix's historic Pioneer & Military Memorial Park.

- History of Phoenix, Arizona
- Pioneer and Military Memorial Park

== Sources ==
- United States Congress. "Benjamin J. Franklin (id: F000343)". Biographical Directory of the United States Congress.

U.S. House of Representatives
Preceded by Abram Comingo	Member of the U.S. House of Representatives from Missouri's 8th congressional district 1875–1879	Succeeded by Samuel Locke Sawyer
Political offices
Preceded by Louis Cameron Hughes	Governor of Arizona Territory; 1896–1897	Succeeded by Myron H. McCord
