= List of United States representatives in the 54th Congress =

This is a complete list of United States representatives during the 54th United States Congress listed by seniority.

As an historical article, the districts and party affiliations listed reflect those during the 54th Congress (March 4, 1895 – March 3, 1897). Seats and party affiliations on similar lists for other congresses will be different for certain members.

Seniority depends on the date on which members were sworn into office. Since many members are sworn in on the same day, subsequent ranking is based on previous congressional service of the individual and then by alphabetical order by the last name of the representative.

Committee chairmanship in the House is often associated with seniority. However, party leadership is typically not associated with seniority.

Note: The "*" indicates that the representative/delegate may have served one or more non-consecutive terms while in the House of Representatives of the United States Congress.

== U.S. House seniority list ==
U.S. House seniority
Rank	Representative	Party	District	Seniority date (Previous service, if any)	No.# of term(s)	Notes
1	David B. Culberson	D	TX-04	March 4, 1875	11th term	Dean of the House; Left the House in 1897.
2	Alfred C. Harmer	R	PA-05	March 4, 1877; Previous service, 1871–1875.	12th term*	
3	Thomas Brackett Reed	R	ME-01	March 4, 1877	10th term	Speaker of the House
4	Henry H. Bingham	R	PA-01	March 4, 1879	9th term	
5	Benton McMillin	D	TN-04	March 4, 1879	9th term	
6	Henry G. Turner	D	GA-11	March 4, 1881	8th term	Left the House in 1897.
7	Nelson Dingley, Jr.	R	ME-02	September 12, 1881	8th term	
8	Robert R. Hitt	R	IL-09	December 4, 1882	8th term	
9	Charles A. Boutelle	R	ME-04	March 4, 1883	7th term	
10	Charles Frederick Crisp	D	GA-03	March 4, 1883	7th term	Died on October 23, 1896.
11	Alexander Monroe Dockery	D	MO-03	March 4, 1883	7th term	
12	David B. Henderson	R	IA-03	March 4, 1883	7th term	
13	Seth L. Milliken	R	ME-03	March 4, 1883	7th term	
14	John Mills Allen	D	MS-01	March 4, 1885	6th term	
15	Thomas C. Catchings	D	MS-03	March 4, 1885	6th term	
16	William H. Crain	D	TX-11	March 4, 1885	6th term	Died on February 10, 1896.
17	William W. Grout	R	VT-02	March 4, 1885; Previous service, 1881–1883.	7th term*	
18	Binger Hermann	R	OR-01	March 4, 1885	6th term	Left the House in 1897.
19	James B. McCreary	D	KY-08	March 4, 1885	6th term	Left the House in 1897.
20	James D. Richardson	D	TN-05	March 4, 1885	6th term	
21	Joseph D. Sayers	D	TX-09	March 4, 1885	6th term	
22	Joseph Wheeler	D	AL-08	March 4, 1885; Previous service, 1881–1882 and 1883.	8th term**	
23	Albert J. Hopkins	R	IL-08	December 7, 1885	6th term	
24	Thomas Chipman McRae	D	AR-03	December 7, 1885	6th term	
25	Harry Welles Rusk	D	MD-03	November 2, 1886	6th term	Left the House in 1897.
26	Joseph Abbott	D	TX-06	March 4, 1887	5th term	Left the House in 1897.
27	John H. Bankhead	D	AL-06	March 4, 1887	5th term	
28	James E. Cobb	D	AL-05	March 4, 1887	5th term	Resigned on April 21, 1896.
29	William Cogswell	R	MA-06	March 4, 1887	5th term	Died on May 22, 1895.
30	John Dalzell	R	PA-22	March 4, 1887	5th term	
31	Charles Addison Russell	R	CT-03	March 4, 1887	5th term	
32	Joseph E. Washington	D	TN-06	March 4, 1887	5th term	Left the House in 1897.
33	Samuel Matthews Robertson	D	LA-06	December 5, 1887	5th term	
34	Charles J. Boatner	D	LA-05	March 4, 1889	4th term	Resigned on March 20, 1896. Returned to the House on June 10, 1896. Left the House in 1897.
35	Marriott Henry Brosius	R	PA-10	March 4, 1889	4th term	
36	Richard Henry Clarke	D	AL-01	March 4, 1889	4th term	Left the House in 1897.
37	Jonathan P. Dolliver	R	IA-10	March 4, 1889	4th term	
38	Rufus E. Lester	D	GA-01	March 4, 1889	4th term	
39	Elijah A. Morse	R	MA-12	March 4, 1889	4th term	Left the House in 1897.
40	George W. Smith	R	IL-22	March 4, 1889	4th term	
41	Samuel M. Stephenson	R	MI-12	March 4, 1889	4th term	Left the House in 1897.
42	John Charles Tarsney	D	MO-05	March 4, 1889	4th term	Resigned on February 27, 1896.
43	Henry St. George Tucker III	D	VA-10	March 4, 1889	4th term	Left the House in 1897.
44	Joseph H. Walker	R	MA-03	March 4, 1889	4th term	
45	John Pickler	R	SD	November 2, 1889	4th term	Left the House in 1897.
46	Sereno E. Payne	R	NY-28	December 2, 1889; Previous service, 1883–1887.	6th term*	
47	Andrew Price	D	LA-03	December 2, 1889	4th term	Left the House in 1897.
48	John E. Reyburn	R	PA-04	February 18, 1890	4th term	Left the House in 1897.
49	Charles Warren Stone	R	PA-27	November 4, 1890	4th term	
50	Joseph Weldon Bailey	D	TX-05	March 4, 1891	3rd term	
51	William Baker	R	KS-06	March 4, 1891	3rd term	Left the House in 1897.
52	William W. Bowers	R	CA-07	March 4, 1891	3rd term	Left the House in 1897.
53	Case Broderick	R	KS-01	March 4, 1891	3rd term	
54	Seth Wallace Cobb	D	MO-12	March 4, 1891	3rd term	Left the House in 1897.
55	Nicholas N. Cox	D	TN-07	March 4, 1891	3rd term	
56	David A. De Armond	D	MO-06	March 4, 1891	3rd term	
57	Warren B. Hooker	R	NY-34	March 4, 1891	3rd term	
58	John A. T. Hull	R	IA-07	March 4, 1891	3rd term	
59	Henry U. Johnson	R	IN-06	March 4, 1891	3rd term	
60	Martin N. Johnson	R	ND	March 4, 1891	3rd term	
61	William Atkinson Jones	D	VA-01	March 4, 1891	3rd term	
62	Omer Madison Kem	P	NE-06	March 4, 1891	3rd term	Left the House in 1897.
63	John C. Kyle	D	MS-02	March 4, 1891	3rd term	Left the House in 1897.
64	Thomas G. Lawson	D	GA-08	March 4, 1891	3rd term	Left the House in 1897.
65	Fernando C. Layton	D	OH-04	March 4, 1891	3rd term	Left the House in 1897.
66	Leonidas F. Livingston	D	GA-05	March 4, 1891	3rd term	
67	Eugene F. Loud	R	CA-05	March 4, 1891	3rd term	
68	Lawrence E. McGann	D	IL-03	March 4, 1891	3rd term	Resigned on December 27, 1895.
69	Adolph Meyer	D	LA-01	March 4, 1891	3rd term	
70	Charles L. Moses	D	GA-04	March 4, 1891	3rd term	Left the House in 1897.
71	Josiah Patterson	D	TN-10	March 4, 1891	3rd term	Left the House in 1897.
72	George D. Perkins	R	IA-11	March 4, 1891	3rd term	
73	H. Henry Powers	R	VT-01	March 4, 1891	3rd term	
74	George W. Ray	R	NY-26	March 4, 1891; Previous service, 1883–1885.	4th term*	
75	John Buchanan Robinson	R	PA-06	March 4, 1891	3rd term	Left the House in 1897.
76	William A. Stone	R	PA-23	March 4, 1891	3rd term	
77	William L. Terry	D	AR-04	March 4, 1891	3rd term	
78	James Wolcott Wadsworth	R	NY-30	March 4, 1891; Previous service, 1881–1885.	5th term*	
79	Newton M. Curtis	R	NY-22	November 3, 1891	3rd term	Left the House in 1897.
80	Elisha E. Meredith	D	VA-08	December 9, 1891	3rd term	Left the House in 1897.
81	John L. McLaurin	D	SC-06	December 5, 1892	3rd term	
82	David D. Aitken	R	MI-06	March 4, 1893	2nd term	Left the House in 1897.
83	J. Frank Aldrich	R	IL-01	March 4, 1893	2nd term	Left the House in 1897.
84	Lewis D. Apsley	R	MA-04	March 4, 1893	2nd term	Left the House in 1897.
85	John Avery	R	MI-11	March 4, 1893	2nd term	Left the House in 1897.
86	Joseph W. Babcock	R	WI-03	March 4, 1893	2nd term	
87	Henry Moore Baker	R	NH-02	March 4, 1893	2nd term	Left the House in 1897.
88	Richard Bartholdt	R	MO-10	March 4, 1893	2nd term	
89	Franklin Bartlett	D	NY-07	March 4, 1893	2nd term	Left the House in 1897.
90	Charles K. Bell	D	TX-08	March 4, 1893	2nd term	Left the House in 1897.
91	John Calhoun Bell	P	CO-02	March 4, 1893	2nd term	
92	Albert S. Berry	D	KY-06	March 4, 1893	2nd term	
93	Joseph Gurney Cannon	R	IL-12	March 4, 1893; Previous service, 1873–1891.	11th term*	
94	Charles A. Chickering	R	NY-24	March 4, 1893	2nd term	
95	Jeremiah V. Cockrell	D	TX-13	March 4, 1893	2nd term	Left the House in 1897.
96	Charles Merian Cooper	D	FL-02	March 4, 1893	2nd term	Left the House in 1897.
97	Henry Allen Cooper	R	WI-01	March 4, 1893	2nd term	
98	Samuel B. Cooper	D	TX-02	March 4, 1893	2nd term	
99	Robert G. Cousins	R	IA-05	March 4, 1893	2nd term	
100	Charles Curtis	R	KS-04	March 4, 1893	2nd term	
101	Charles Daniels	R	NY-33	March 4, 1893	2nd term	Left the House in 1897.
102	Hugh A. Dinsmore	D	AR-05	March 4, 1893	2nd term	
103	William H. Doolittle	R	WA	March 4, 1893	2nd term	Left the House in 1897.
104	William F. Draper	R	MA-11	March 4, 1893	2nd term	Left the House in 1897.
105	William R. Ellis	R	OR-02	March 4, 1893	2nd term	
106	Constantine Jacob Erdman	D	PA-09	March 4, 1893	2nd term	Left the House in 1897.
107	Loren Fletcher	R	MN-05	March 4, 1893	2nd term	
108	John J. Gardner	R	NJ-02	March 4, 1893	2nd term	
109	Charles W. Gillet	R	NY-29	March 4, 1893	2nd term	
110	Frederick H. Gillett	R	MA-02	March 4, 1893	2nd term	
111	Charles H. Grosvenor	R	OH-11	March 4, 1893; Previous service, 1885–1891.	5th term*	
112	Alva L. Hager	R	IA-09	March 4, 1893	2nd term	
113	Eugene Jerome Hainer	R	NE-04	March 4, 1893	2nd term	Left the House in 1897.
114	Uriel Sebree Hall	D	MO-02	March 4, 1893	2nd term	Left the House in 1897.
115	Charles S. Hartman	R	MT	March 4, 1893	2nd term	
116	Daniel B. Heiner	R	PA-21	March 4, 1893	2nd term	Left the House in 1897.
117	William Peters Hepburn	R	IA-08	March 4, 1893; Previous service, 1881–1887.	5th term*	
118	Josiah Duane Hicks	R	PA-20	March 4, 1893	2nd term	
119	George W. Hulick	R	OH-06	March 4, 1893	2nd term	Left the House in 1897.
120	Joseph Chappell Hutcheson	D	TX-01	March 4, 1893	2nd term	Left the House in 1897.
121	Andrew Kiefer	R	MN-04	March 4, 1893	2nd term	Left the House in 1897.
122	John F. Lacey	R	IA-06	March 4, 1893; Previous service, 1889–1891.	3rd term*	
123	Asbury Latimer	D	SC-03	March 4, 1893	2nd term	
124	Jacob LeFever	R	NY-18	March 4, 1893	2nd term	Left the House in 1897.
125	William S. Linton	R	MI-08	March 4, 1893	2nd term	Left the House in 1897.
126	Henry C. Loudenslager	R	NJ-01	March 4, 1893	2nd term	
127	John W. Maddox	D	GA-07	March 4, 1893	2nd term	
128	James G. Maguire	D	CA-04	March 4, 1893	2nd term	
129	Thaddeus Maclay Mahon	R	PA-18	March 4, 1893	2nd term	
130	Benjamin F. Marsh	R	IL-15	March 4, 1893; Previous service, 1877–1883.	5th term*	
131	Samuel W. McCall	R	MA-08	March 4, 1893	2nd term	
132	James McCleary	R	MN-02	March 4, 1893	2nd term	
133	Philip D. McCulloch, Jr.	D	AR-01	March 4, 1893	2nd term	
134	James C. McDearmon	D	TN-09	March 4, 1893	2nd term	Left the House in 1897.
135	George de Rue Meiklejohn	R	NE-03	March 4, 1893	2nd term	Left the House in 1897.
136	David Henry Mercer	R	NE-02	March 4, 1893	2nd term	
137	Hernando Money	D	MS-04	March 4, 1893; Previous service, 1875–1885.	7th term*	Left the House in 1897.
138	Robert Neill	D	AR-06	March 4, 1893	2nd term	Left the House in 1897.
139	Francis G. Newlands	D	NV	March 4, 1893	2nd term	
140	Stephen A. Northway	R	OH-19	March 4, 1893	2nd term	
141	George C. Pendleton	D	TX-07	March 4, 1893	2nd term	Left the House in 1897.
142	Thomas Wharton Phillips	R	PA-25	March 4, 1893	2nd term	Left the House in 1897.
143	Gaston A. Robbins	D	AL-04	March 4, 1893	2nd term	Resigned on March 13, 1896.
144	Benjamin E. Russell	D	GA-02	March 4, 1893	2nd term	Left the House in 1897.
145	Joseph A. Scranton	R	PA-11	March 4, 1893; Previous service, 1881–1883, 1885–1887 and 1889–1891.	4th term***	Left the House in 1897.
146	Thomas Settle	R	NC-05	March 4, 1893	2nd term	Left the House in 1897.
147	James S. Sherman	R	NY-25	March 4, 1893; Previous service, 1887–1891.	4th term*	
148	Jesse F. Stallings	D	AL-02	March 4, 1893	2nd term	
149	Thomas J. Strait	D	SC-05	March 4, 1893	2nd term	
150	Luther M. Strong	R	OH-08	March 4, 1893	2nd term	Left the House in 1897.
151	Claude A. Swanson	D	VA-05	March 4, 1893	2nd term	
152	W. Jasper Talbert	D	SC-02	March 4, 1893	2nd term	
153	Farish Carter Tate	D	GA-09	March 4, 1893	2nd term	
154	James Albertus Tawney	R	MN-01	March 4, 1893	2nd term	
155	Henry F. Thomas	R	MI-04	March 4, 1893	2nd term	Left the House in 1897.
156	David Gardiner Tyler	D	VA-02	March 4, 1893	2nd term	Left the House in 1897.
157	Thomas Updegraff	R	IA-04	March 4, 1893; Previous service, 1879–1883.	4th term*	
158	H. Clay Van Voorhis	R	OH-15	March 4, 1893	2nd term	
159	Irving Price Wanger	R	PA-07	March 4, 1893	2nd term	
160	John Sharp Williams	D	MS-05	March 4, 1893	2nd term	
161	George W. Wilson	R	OH-07	March 4, 1893	2nd term	Left the House in 1897.
162	Frederick Augustus Woodard	D	NC-02	March 4, 1893	2nd term	Left the House in 1897.
163	Ephraim Milton Woomer	R	PA-14	March 4, 1893	2nd term	Left the House in 1897.
164	Ashley B. Wright	R	MA-01	March 4, 1893	2nd term	
165	Robert Adams, Jr.	R	PA-02	December 19, 1893	2nd term	
166	Lemuel E. Quigg	R	NY-14	January 30, 1894	2nd term	
167	Smith S. Turner	D	VA-07	January 30, 1894	2nd term	Left the House in 1897.
168	Galusha A. Grow	R	PA	February 26, 1894; Previous service, 1851–1863.	8th term*	
169	Henry Warren Ogden	D	LA-04	May 12, 1894	2nd term	
170	Paul J. Sorg	D	OH-03	May 21, 1894	2nd term	Left the House in 1897.
171	Michael Griffin	R	WI-07	November 5, 1894	2nd term	
172	Charles Edward Coffin	R	MD-05	November 6, 1894	2nd term	Left the House in 1897.
173	George Paul Harrison, Jr.	D	AL-03	November 6, 1894	2nd term	Left the House in 1897.
174	Jacob H. Bromwell	R	OH-02	December 3, 1894	2nd term	
175	John Sebastian Little	D	AR-02	December 3, 1894	2nd term	
176	Ernest F. Acheson	R	PA-24	March 4, 1895	1st term	
177	William Coleman Anderson	R	TN-01	March 4, 1895	1st term	Left the House in 1897.
178	William E. Andrews	R	NE-05	March 4, 1895	1st term	Left the House in 1897.
179	Warren O. Arnold	R	RI-02	March 4, 1895; Previous service, 1887–1891.	3rd term*	Left the House in 1897.
180	William Carlile Arnold	R	PA-28	March 4, 1895	1st term	
181	Harrison Henry Atwood	R	MA-10	March 4, 1895	1st term	Left the House in 1897.
182	William Benjamin Baker	R	MD-02	March 4, 1895	1st term	
183	John All Barham	R	CA-01	March 4, 1895	1st term	
184	Samuel S. Barney	R	WI-05	March 4, 1895	1st term	
185	William Emerson Barrett	R	MA-07	March 4, 1895	1st term	
186	Charles Lafayette Bartlett	D	GA-06	March 4, 1895	1st term	
187	Clifton B. Beach	R	OH-20	March 4, 1895	1st term	
188	Charles G. Bennett	R	NY-05	March 4, 1895	1st term	
189	Roswell P. Bishop	R	MI-09	March 4, 1895	1st term	
190	Frank S. Black	R	NY-19	March 4, 1895	1st term	Resigned on January 7, 1897.
191	Richard W. Blue	R	KS	March 4, 1895	1st term	Left the House in 1897.
192	Henry C. Brewster	R	NY-31	March 4, 1895	1st term	
193	Foster V. Brown	R	TN-03	March 4, 1895	1st term	Left the House in 1897.
194	Charles N. Brumm	R	PA-13	March 4, 1895; Previous service, 1881–1889.	5th term*	
195	Charles F. Buck	D	LA-02	March 4, 1895	1st term	Left the House in 1897.
196	Melville Bull	R	RI-01	March 4, 1895	1st term	
197	Orlando Burrell	R	IL-20	March 4, 1895	1st term	Left the House in 1897.
198	Charles Germman Burton	R	MO-15	March 4, 1895	1st term	Left the House in 1897.
199	Theodore E. Burton	R	OH-21	March 4, 1895; Previous service, 1889–1891.	2nd term*	
200	William A. Calderhead	R	KS-05	March 4, 1895	1st term	Left the House in 1897.
201	John Daniel Clardy	D	KY-02	March 4, 1895	1st term	
202	Charles Nelson Clark	R	MO-01	March 4, 1895	1st term	Left the House in 1897.
203	Samuel M. Clark	R	IA-01	March 4, 1895	1st term	
204	David Grant Colson	R	KY-11	March 4, 1895	1st term	
205	James A. Connolly	R	IL-17	March 4, 1895	1st term	
206	Edward D. Cooke	R	IL-06	March 4, 1895	1st term	
207	Samuel A. Cook	R	WI-06	March 4, 1895	1st term	Left the House in 1897.
208	John Blaisdell Corliss	R	MI-01	March 4, 1895	1st term	
209	John Kissig Cowen	D	MD-04	March 4, 1895	1st term	Left the House in 1897.
210	George Calhoun Crowther	R	MO-04	March 4, 1895	1st term	Left the House in 1897.
211	Miles Crowley	D	TX-10	March 4, 1895	1st term	Left the House in 1897.
212	Rousseau Owen Crump	R	MI-10	March 4, 1895	1st term	
213	George M. Curtis	R	IA-02	March 4, 1895	1st term	
214	Lorenzo Danford	R	OH-16	March 4, 1895; Previous service, 1873–1879.	4th term*	
215	Alston G. Dayton	R	WV-02	March 4, 1895	1st term	
216	Walter M. Denny	D	MS-06	March 4, 1895	1st term	Left the House in 1897.
217	Blackburn B. Dovener	R	WV-01	March 4, 1895	1st term	
218	Finis E. Downing	R	IL-16	March 4, 1895	1st term	Resigned on June 5, 1896.
219	Frank Eddy	R	MN-07	March 4, 1895	1st term	
220	Tazewell Ellett	D	VA-03	March 4, 1895	1st term	Left the House in 1897.
221	William Elliott	D	SC-01	March 4, 1895; Previous service, 1887–1890 and 1891–1893.	4th term**	Resigned on June 4, 1896.
222	Walter Evans	R	KY-05	March 4, 1895	1st term	
223	Benjamin L. Fairchild	R	NY-16	March 4, 1895	1st term	Left the House in 1897.
224	George W. Faris	R	IN-08	March 4, 1895	1st term	
225	Lucien J. Fenton	R	OH-10	March 4, 1895	1st term	
226	Israel F. Fischer	R	NY-04	March 4, 1895	1st term	
227	John F. Fitzgerald	D	MA-09	March 4, 1895	1st term	
228	Wallace T. Foote, Jr.	R	NY-23	March 4, 1895	1st term	
229	George Edmund Foss	R	IL-07	March 4, 1895	1st term	
230	Charles N. Fowler	R	NJ-08	March 4, 1895	1st term	
231	Robert J. Gamble	R	SD	March 4, 1895	1st term	Left the House in 1897.
232	Henry R. Gibson	R	TN-02	March 4, 1895	1st term	
233	Joseph V. Graff	R	IL-14	March 4, 1895	1st term	
234	Matthew Griswold	R	PA-26	March 4, 1895; Previous service, 1891–1893.	2nd term*	Left the House in 1897.
235	Frederick Halterman	R	PA-03	March 4, 1895	1st term	Left the House in 1897.
236	Alexander M. Hardy	R	IN-02	March 4, 1895	1st term	Left the House in 1897.
237	James A. Hemenway	R	IN-01	March 4, 1895	1st term	
238	Frank Hanly	R	IN-09	March 4, 1895	1st term	Left the House in 1897.
239	Stephen Ross Harris	R	OH-13	March 4, 1895	1st term	Left the House in 1897.
240	Joseph Johnson Hart	D	PA-08	March 4, 1895	1st term	Left the House in 1897.
241	Jethro A. Hatch	R	IN-10	March 4, 1895	1st term	Left the House in 1897.
242	Joel Heatwole	R	MN-03	March 4, 1895	1st term	
243	John Kerr Hendrick	D	KY-01	March 4, 1895	1st term	Left the House in 1897.
244	Charles L. Henry	R	IN-07	March 4, 1895	1st term	
245	E. Stevens Henry	R	CT-01	March 4, 1895	1st term	
246	Samuel G. Hilborn	R	CA-03	March 4, 1895; Previous service, 1892–1894.	3rd term*	
247	Ebenezer J. Hill	R	CT-04	March 4, 1895	1st term	
248	Milford W. Howard	P	AL-07	March 4, 1895	1st term	
249	Benjamin Franklin Howell	R	NJ-03	March 4, 1895	1st term	
250	James R. Howe	R	NY-06	March 4, 1895	1st term	
251	Joel Douglas Hubbard	R	MO-08	March 4, 1895	1st term	Left the House in 1897.
252	George Franklin Huff	R	PA	March 4, 1895; Previous service, 1891–1893.	2nd term*	Left the House in 1897.
253	James Hall Huling	R	WV-03	March 4, 1895	1st term	Left the House in 1897.
254	W. Godfrey Hunter	R	KY-03	March 4, 1895; Previous service, 1887–1889.	2nd term*	Left the House in 1897.
255	Denis M. Hurley	R	NY-02	March 4, 1895	1st term	
256	Samuel C. Hyde	R	WA	March 4, 1895	1st term	Left the House in 1897.
257	John J. Jenkins	R	WI-10	March 4, 1895	1st term	
258	Grove L. Johnson	R	CA-02	March 4, 1895	1st term	Left the House in 1897.
259	Charles Frederick Joy	R	MO-11	March 4, 1895; Previous service, 1893–1894.	2nd term*	
260	Joseph M. Kendall	D	KY-10	March 4, 1895; Previous service, 1892–1893.	2nd term*	Resigned on February 18, 1897.
261	Winfield S. Kerr	R	OH-14	March 4, 1895	1st term	
262	Snyder S. Kirkpatrick	R	KS-03	March 4, 1895	1st term	Left the House in 1897.
263	William Shadrach Knox	R	MA-05	March 4, 1895	1st term	
264	Monroe Henry Kulp	R	PA-17	March 4, 1895	1st term	
265	Jacob D. Leighty	R	IN-12	March 4, 1895	1st term	Left the House in 1897.
266	John Leisenring	R	PA-12	March 4, 1895	1st term	Left the House in 1897.
267	Fred Churchill Leonard	R	PA-16	March 4, 1895	1st term	Left the House in 1897.
268	John W. Lewis	R	KY-04	March 4, 1895	1st term	Left the House in 1897.
269	Romulus Zachariah Linney	R	NC-08	March 4, 1895	1st term	
270	James A. Lockhart	D	NC-06	March 4, 1895	1st term	Resigned on June 5, 1896.
271	Chester I. Long	R	KS-07	March 4, 1895	1st term	Left the House in 1897.
272	William Lorimer	R	IL-02	March 4, 1895	1st term	
273	Philip B. Low	R	NY-15	March 4, 1895	1st term	
274	Rowland B. Mahany	R	NY-32	March 4, 1895	1st term	
275	George B. McClellan, Jr.	D	NY-12	March 4, 1895	1st term	
276	Addison S. McClure	R	OH-17	March 4, 1895; Previous service, 1881–1883.	2nd term*	Left the House in 1897.
277	Richard Cunningham McCormick	R	NY-01	March 4, 1895; Previous service, 1869–1875.	4th term*	Left the House in 1897.
278	John E. McCall	R	TN-08	March 4, 1895	1st term	Left the House in 1897.
279	Thomas McEwan, Jr.	R	NJ-07	March 4, 1895	1st term	
280	William Robertson McKenney	D	VA-04	March 4, 1895	1st term	Resigned on May 2, 1896.
281	James McLachlan	R	CA-06	March 4, 1895	1st term	Left the House in 1897.
282	Joshua Weldon Miles	D	MD-01	March 4, 1895	1st term	Left the House in 1897.
283	Orrin Larrabee Miller	R	KS-02	March 4, 1895	1st term	Left the House in 1897.
284	Warren Miller	R	WV-04	March 4, 1895	1st term	
285	Henry C. Miner	D	NY-09	March 4, 1895	1st term	Left the House in 1897.
286	Edward S. Minor	R	WI-08	March 4, 1895	1st term	
287	Franklin Wheeler Mondell	R	WY	March 4, 1895	1st term	Left the House in 1897.
288	Norman Adolphus Mozley	R	MO-14	March 4, 1895	1st term	Left the House in 1897.
289	Everett J. Murphy	R	IL-21	March 4, 1895	1st term	Left the House in 1897.
290	George H. Noonan	R	TX-12	March 4, 1895	1st term	Left the House in 1897.
291	Benjamin Barker Odell, Jr.	R	NY-17	March 4, 1895	1st term	
292	Peter J. Otey	D	VA-06	March 4, 1895	1st term	
293	Theobald Otjen	R	WI-04	March 4, 1895	1st term	
294	Jesse Overstreet	R	IN-05	March 4, 1895	1st term	
295	William Claiborne Owens	D	KY-07	March 4, 1895	1st term	Left the House in 1897.
296	Richard W. Parker	R	NJ-06	March 4, 1895	1st term	
297	Richmond Pearson	R	NC-09	March 4, 1895	1st term	
298	Mahlon Pitney	R	NJ-04	March 4, 1895	1st term	
299	Theodore L. Poole	R	NY-27	March 4, 1895	1st term	Left the House in 1897.
300	Samuel Johnson Pugh	R	KY-09	March 4, 1895	1st term	
301	John Henry Raney	R	MO-13	March 4, 1895	1st term	Left the House in 1897.
302	Walter Reeves	R	IL-11	March 4, 1895	1st term	
303	Frederick Remann	R	IL-18	March 4, 1895	1st term	Died on July 14, 1895.
304	Lemuel W. Royse	R	IN-13	March 4, 1895	1st term	
305	Edward Sauerhering	R	WI-02	March 4, 1895	1st term	
306	John F. Shafroth	R	CO-01	March 4, 1895	1st term	
307	Richard C. Shannon	R	NY-13	March 4, 1895	1st term	
308	John G. Shaw	D	NC-03	March 4, 1895	1st term	Left the House in 1897.
309	Alonzo C. Shuford	P	NC-07	March 4, 1895	1st term	
310	John Simpkins	R	MA-13	March 4, 1895	1st term	
311	Harry Skinner	P	NC-01	March 4, 1895	1st term	
312	William Alden Smith	R	MI-05	March 4, 1895	1st term	
313	Horace G. Snover	R	MI-07	March 4, 1895	1st term	
314	James H. Southard	R	OH-09	March 4, 1895	1st term	
315	George N. Southwick	R	NY-20	March 4, 1895	1st term	
316	George Spalding	R	MI-02	March 4, 1895	1st term	
317	Stephen M. Sparkman	D	FL-01	March 4, 1895	1st term	
318	James G. Spencer	D	MS-07	March 4, 1895	1st term	Left the House in 1897.
319	Nehemiah D. Sperry	R	CT-02	March 4, 1895	1st term	
320	James Alonzo Stahle	R	PA-19	March 4, 1895	1st term	Left the House in 1897.
321	George Washington Steele	R	IN-11	March 4, 1895; Previous service, 1881–1889.	5th term*	
322	Alexander Stewart	R	WI-09	March 4, 1895	1st term	
323	James F. Stewart	R	NJ-05	March 4, 1895	1st term	
324	J. William Stokes	D	SC-07	March 4, 1895	1st term	Resigned on June 1, 1896. Returned to the House on November 3, 1896.
325	Jesse Burr Strode	R	NE-01	March 4, 1895	1st term	
326	William Franklin Strowd	D	NC-04	March 4, 1895	1st term	
327	Cyrus A. Sulloway	R	NH-01	March 4, 1895	1st term	
328	William Sulzer	D	NY-11	March 4, 1895	1st term	
329	Charles Phelps Taft	R	OH-01	March 4, 1895	1st term	Left the House in 1897.
330	Robert Walker Tayler	R	OH-18	March 4, 1895	1st term	
331	Charles A. Towne	R	MN-06	March 4, 1895	1st term	Left the House in 1897.
332	John Plank Tracey	R	MO-07	March 4, 1895	1st term	Left the House in 1897.
333	Robert J. Tracewell	R	IN-03	March 4, 1895	1st term	Left the House in 1897.
334	William M. Treloar	R	MO-09	March 4, 1895	1st term	Left the House in 1897.
335	Oscar Underwood	D	AL-09	March 4, 1895	1st term	Resigned on June 9, 1896.
336	James A. Walker	R	VA-09	March 4, 1895	1st term	
337	James J. Walsh	D	NY-08	March 4, 1895	1st term	Resigned on June 2, 1896.
338	Vespasian Warner	R	IL-13	March 4, 1895	1st term	
339	David K. Watson	R	OH-12	March 4, 1895	1st term	Left the House in 1897.
340	James Eli Watson	R	IN-04	March 4, 1895	1st term	Left the House in 1897.
341	George L. Wellington	R	MD-06	March 4, 1895	1st term	Left the House in 1897.
342	George E. White	R	IL-05	March 4, 1895	1st term	
343	David F. Wilber	R	NY-21	March 4, 1895	1st term	
344	Edgar Wilson	R	ID	March 4, 1895	1st term	Left the House in 1897.
345	Francis H. Wilson	R	NY-03	March 4, 1895	1st term	
346	Stanyarne Wilson	D	SC-04	March 4, 1895	1st term	
347	Jonathan S. Willis	R	DE	March 4, 1895	1st term	Left the House in 1897.
348	Francis B. De Witt	R	OH-05	March 4, 1895	1st term	Left the House in 1897.
349	Benson Wood	R	IL-19	March 4, 1895	1st term	Left the House in 1897.
350	Charles W. Woodman	R	IL-04	March 4, 1895	1st term	Left the House in 1897.
351	Charles Henderson Yoakum	D	TX-03	March 4, 1895	1st term	Left the House in 1897.
	James C. C. Black	D	GA-10	October 2, 1895; Previous service, 1893–1895.	2nd term*	Left the House in 1897.
	James Hodge Codding	R	PA-15	November 5, 1895	1st term	
	Amos J. Cummings	D	NY-10	November 5, 1895; Previous service, 1887–1889 and 1889–1894.	5th term**	
	William Henry Moody	R	MA-06	November 5, 1895	1st term	
	William F. L. Hadley	R	IL-18	December 2, 1895	1st term	Left the House in 1897.
	Alfred Milnes	R	MI-03	December 2, 1895	1st term	Left the House in 1897.
	George W. Prince	R	IL-10	December 2, 1895	1st term	
	Hugh R. Belknap	R	IL-03	December 27, 1895	1st term	
	Clarence Emir Allen	R	UT-01	January 4, 1896	1st term	Left the House in 1897.
	Robert T. Van Horn	R	MO-05	February 27, 1896; Previous service, 1865–1871 and 1881–1883.	5th term**	Left the House in 1897.
	William F. Aldrich	R	AL-04	March 13, 1896	1st term	Left the House in 1897.
	Rudolph Kleberg	D	TX-11	April 7, 1896	1st term	
	Albert Taylor Goodwyn	P	AL-05	April 22, 1896	1st term	Left the House in 1897.
	Robert Taylor Thorp	R	VA-04	May 2, 1896	1st term	Left the House in 1897.
	John M. Mitchell	R	NY-08	June 2, 1896	1st term	
	George W. Murray	R	SC-01	June 4, 1896; Previous service, 1893–1895.	2nd term*	Left the House in 1897.
	Charles H. Martin	P	NC-06	June 5, 1896	1st term	
	John I. Rinaker	R	IL-16	June 5, 1896	1st term	Left the House in 1897.
	Truman H. Aldrich	R	AL-09	June 9, 1896	1st term	Left the House in 1897.
	Charles R. Crisp	D	GA-03	December 19, 1896	1st term	Left the House in 1897.
	Nathan T. Hopkins	R	KY-10	February 18, 1897	1st term	Left the House in 1897.

== Delegates ==
Rank	Delegate	Party	District	Seniority date (Previous service, if any)	No.# of term(s)	Notes
1	Dennis Thomas Flynn	R	OK	March 4, 1893	2nd term	
2	Frank J. Cannon	R	UT	March 4, 1895	1st term	
3	Thomas B. Catron	R	NM	March 4, 1895	1st term	
4	Oakes Murphy	R	AZ	March 4, 1895	1st term	

== See also ==
- 54th United States Congress
- List of United States congressional districts
- List of United States senators in the 54th Congress
