= Niedringhaus =

Niedringhaus is a surname. Notable people with the surname include:

- Anja Niedringhaus (1965–2014), German photojournalist
- Frederick G. Niedringhaus (1837–1922), American businessman and politician
- Henry F. Niedringhaus (1864–1941), American politician
