= Claude I. Bakewell =

American politician (1912–1987)

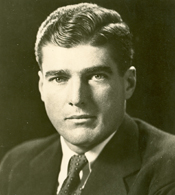

Member of the U.S. House of Representatives from Missouri's 11th district
- In office January 3, 1947 – January 3, 1949
- Preceded by: John B. Sullivan
- Succeeded by: John B. Sullivan
- In office March 9, 1951 – January 3, 1953
- Preceded by: John B. Sullivan
- Succeeded by: Morgan M. Moulder

Personal details
- Born: Claude Ignatius Bakewell; August 9, 1912 St. Louis, Missouri, U.S.
- Died: March 18, 1987 (aged 74) University City, Missouri, U.S.
- Resting place: Calvary Cemetery
- Party: Republican
- Education: St. Louis University High School; Georgetown University; Saint Louis University School of Law
- Profession: Lawyer

Military service
- Branch/service: United States Navy
- Years of service: 1944–1946

Claude Ignatius Bakewell (August 9, 1912 – March 18, 1987) was an American lawyer, U.S. Representative from Missouri's 11th congressional district, and U.S. Postmaster for St. Louis, Missouri.

== Early life and career ==
Born in St. Louis, Missouri, Bakewell was one of the five children of Paul Bakewell, Jr. and Mary Morgan (née Fullerton) Bakewell. Mary Fullerton was reportedly "the richest girl" in St. Louis, daughter of Joseph Scott Fullerton and a grand-niece of J. P. Morgan. His grandfather, Paul Bakewell, was a patent and trademark lawyer in the firm Bakewell & Church whose wife was a granddaughter of the first Missouri governor Alexander McNair. Claude Bakewell's great-grandfather was a Missouri judge, Robert Armytage Bakewell, who was married to Nancy de Laureal. Claude Bakewell graduated from St. Louis University High School and then in 1932 from Georgetown University. In 1935, he graduated from St. Louis University School of Law and became a lawyer in private practice.

In the 25th Ward, he served as member of the board of aldermen of St. Louis, Missouri from 1941–45 and was chairman of the legislation committee. From 1944 to 1946, Bakewell served in the United States Navy.

== Congress ==
Bakewell sat on the House Judiciary Committee while serving. In 1952, Bakewell was one of three representatives who opposed bringing an unamended bill by Representatives Joseph Bryson and Estes Kefauver to the House floor. That bill would have required royalty fees for jukeboxes that played music on disks. Bakewell was the only Republican who signed the minority report of House Bill 4484, a quitclaim bill regarding tidelands, because he felt that it empowered Congress to remove the sovereignty of U.S. public lands rather than disposing of the lands themselves.

Responding to an anti-segregation plan by the St. Louis Committee of Racial Equality by sending interracial dining groups to three mall restaurants, Bakewell wrote: "It appears utterly inconsistent that the department stores would welcome the patronage of a large segment of the population at all counters and in all departments but would arbitrarily exclude them from the dining facilities."

== Electoral history ==
Bakewell was elected as a Republican to the 80th United States Congress in 1946. Phyllis Schlafly, conservative activist and founder of Eagle Forum, managed Bakewell's 1946 campaign. In 1948 Bakewell laid out a liberal platform: An increase in the minimum wage, rent control, low-rent housing, strong anti-trust laws, enlarged Social Security, abolition of the poll tax, and supportive of immigration by displaced persons. However, Bakewell lost his 1948 re-election bid to John B. Sullivan, a Democrat, whom he had displaced in 1946.

Following the death of Sullivan, Bakewell was re-elected to the 11th district seat in a special election in March 1951. Bakewell linked his Democratic opponent Harry Schendel to the political machine dominated by Morris Shenker and Larry Callanan; Democrats whom they backed usually won most elections. As it was the midst of the Second Red Scare, Bakewell also labeled Schendel a "stooge" of the political action committee of the Congress of Industrial Organizations, a committee he considered "Moscow-inspired." Bakewell won the election by 6,187 votes, and his victory was hailed as a defeat of an otherwise powerful political machine. However, Bakewell lost the regular 1952 election to Sullivan's widow, Leonor K. Sullivan. To date, he is the last Republican to represent a significant portion of St. Louis in the House.

== After Congress ==
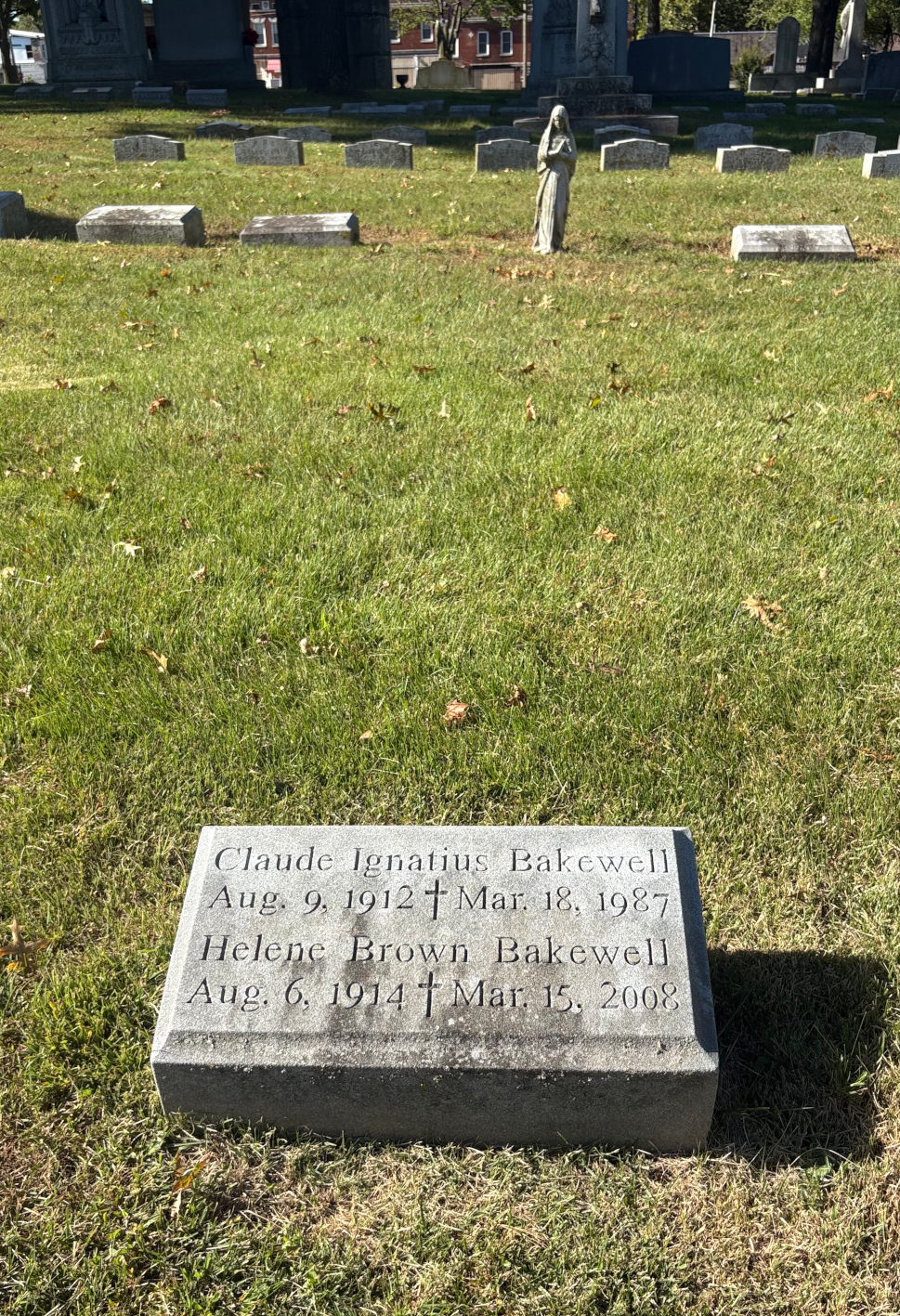
Bakewell's grave at Calvary Cemetery

From 1958 to 1982, Bakewell was the postmaster for St. Louis. He died in University City, Missouri on March 18, 1987, aged 74, and was interred at Calvary Cemetery in St. Louis.

U.S. House of Representatives
Preceded by John B. Sullivan	Member of the U.S. House of Representatives from Missouri's 11th congressional district 1947–1949	Succeeded by John B. Sullivan
Preceded by Vacant	Member of the U.S. House of Representatives from Missouri's 11th congressional district 1951–1953	Succeeded by Morgan M. Moulder
