= John T. Hunt =

American politician

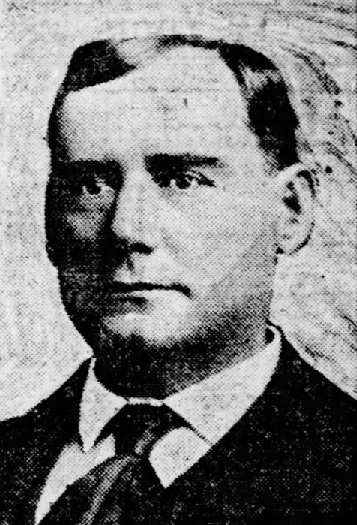
- St. Louis Post-Dispatch, November 5, 1902

Member of the U.S. House of Representatives from Missouri's 11th district
- In office March 4, 1903 – March 3, 1907
- Preceded by: Charles Frederick Joy
- Succeeded by: Henry S. Caulfield

Personal details
- Born: John Thomas Hunt; February 2, 1860 St. Louis, Missouri, U.S.
- Died: November 30, 1916 (aged 56) St. Louis, Missouri, U.S.
- Resting place: Calvary Cemetery
- Party: Republican

John Thomas Hunt (February 2, 1860 – November 30, 1916) was a U.S. representative from Missouri.

Born in St. Louis, Missouri, Hunt attended the common schools. In his youth, he was a professional ball player and umpire. He became a stonecutter and later a stone contractor.

Hunt was elected as a Democrat to the Fifty-eighth and Fifty-ninth Congresses (March 4, 1903 – March 3, 1907). During his service in Congress, he was the only Representative to have a union card. He was an unsuccessful candidate for renomination in 1906 and for nomination in 1908. He resumed the business of stone contractor. He died in St. Louis, Missouri, November 30, 1916. He was interred in Calvary Cemetery.

U.S. House of Representatives
Preceded by Charles Frederick Joy	Member of the U.S. House of Representatives from Missouri's 11th congressional district March 4, 1903 – March 3, 1907	Succeeded by Henry S. Caulfield
