= Edna F. Kelly =

American politician (1906–1997)

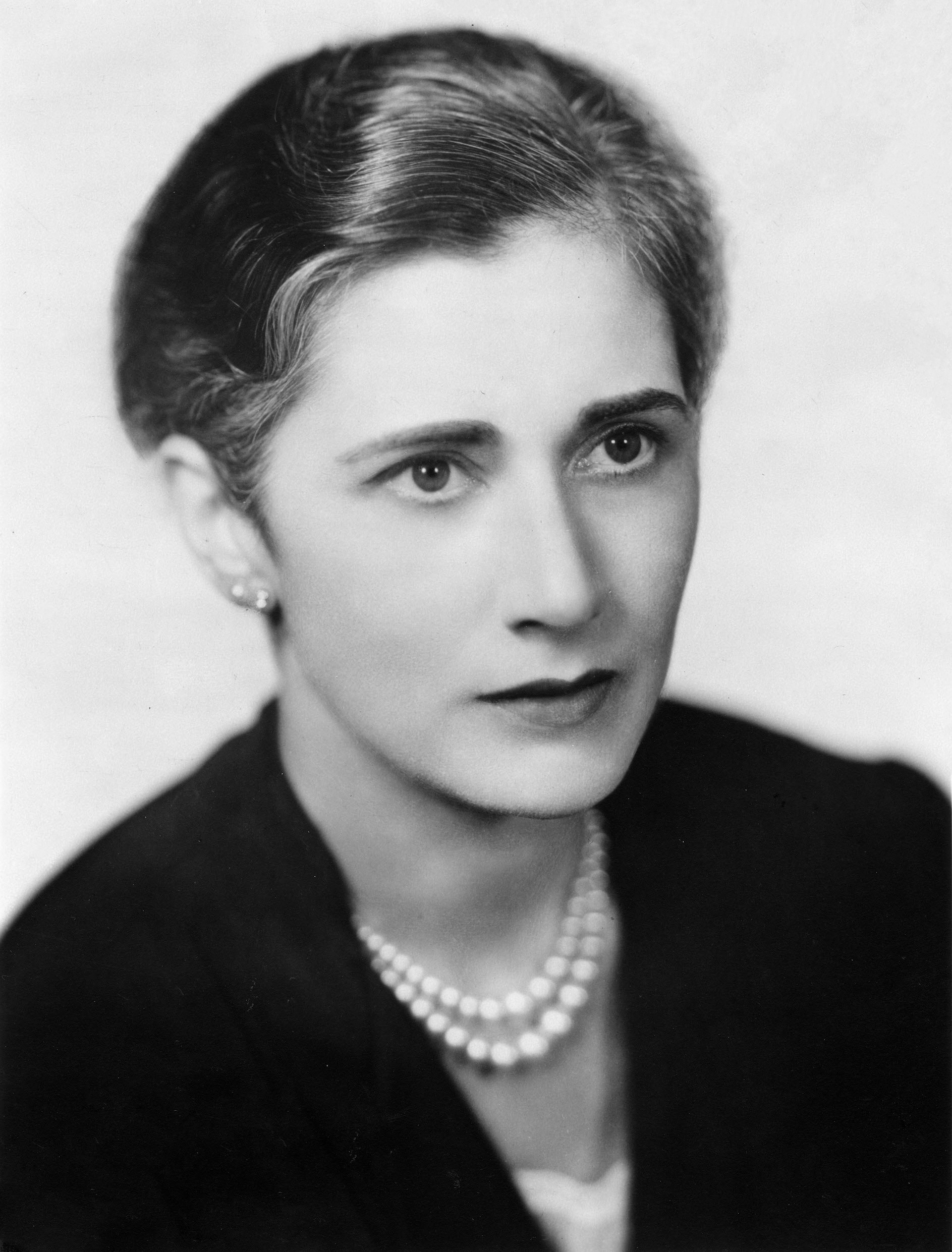

Secretary of the House Democratic Caucus
- In office January 7, 1964 – January 3, 1965
- Leader: John McCormack
- Preceded by: Leonor Sullivan
- Succeeded by: Leonor Sullivan
- In office January 3, 1953 – January 3, 1957
- Leader: Sam Rayburn
- Preceded by: Chase Woodhouse
- Succeeded by: Leonor Sullivan

Member of the U.S. House of Representatives from New York
- In office November 8, 1949 – January 3, 1969
- Preceded by: Andrew Somers
- Succeeded by: Shirley Chisholm
- Constituency: 10th district (1949–1963); 12th district (1963–1969)

Personal details
- Born: Edna Flannery; August 20, 1906 East Hampton, New York, U.S.
- Died: December 14, 1997 (aged 91) Alexandria, Virginia, U.S.
- Party: Democratic
- Spouse: Edward Kelly (m. 1928; died 1942)
- Education: Hunter College (BA)

Edna Flannery Kelly (August 20, 1906 – December 14, 1997) was an American politician who served ten terms as a Democratic member of the United States House of Representatives from New York from 1949 to 1969.

== Biography ==
Kelly was born in East Hampton, New York. Her father was postmaster and clerk of Kings County William E. Kelly. She graduated from Hunter College in 1928. She was a delegate to the 1948 Democratic National Convention, 1952 Democratic National Convention, 1956 Democratic National Convention, 1960 Democratic National Convention, and 1968 Democratic National Convention. She spoke for the nomination of New York Governor W. Averell Harriman, touting his anti-communist credentials at the 1956 convention; and she seconded his nomination.

=== Tenure in Congress ===
She was elected to Congress in 1949 to fill the vacancy caused by the death of Andrew L. Somers and served from November 8, 1949 until January 3, 1969. She was a Democratic National Committee member from 1956 until 1968.

Throughout her 19-year career in the House, Kelly was recognized for her expertise in foreign affairs, serving as the chair of the Subcommittee on Europe and retiring from Congress as the third ranking member of the House Committee on Foreign Affairs. During her tenure, Kelly was responsible for measures that settled displaced people after World War II and refugees for Russia and Eastern Europe. She also helped to create the United States Arms Control and Disarmament Agency.

One news report pointed to her advocacy of "women's and social issues, drawing attention to inequities in pay, credit and tax policy, including what she considered inadequate deductions for child care." This work culminated in passage of the Internal Revenue Code of 1954.

Kelly can also be credited with promoting the first equal pay for equal work bill, which she introduced in 1951. It was a landmark effort, which established a new era in the fight for women's equality. She was in attendance when President John F. Kennedy signed the Equal Pay Act into law June 10, 1963.

=== Redistricting and final campaign ===
Following redistricting, Kelly challenged Dean of the United States House of Representatives Emanuel Celler in the 1968 Democratic primary election instead of Shirley Chisholm, who was backed by local party leader Stanley Steingut in the redrawn 12th district and ultimately succeeded Kelly. She lost to Celler. Several years later, Celler would be narrowly defeated by Elizabeth Holtzman in the 1972 Democratic primary.

=== Family ===
She was married to New York City Court Justice Edward L. Kelly of Brooklyn, who was killed in a 1942 car crash.

=== Death ===
Kelly died in Alexandria, Virginia of cancer and a series of strokes at the age of 91. She had two children, eight grandchildren and 17 great-grandchildren.

== See also ==
- Women in the United States House of Representatives

== Sources ==
- United States Congress. "Edna F. Kelly (id: K000070)". Biographical Directory of the United States Congress.

U.S. House of Representatives
| Preceded by Andrew Somers | Member of the U.S. House of Representatives from New York's 10th congressional district 1949–1963 | Succeeded by Emanuel Celler |
| Preceded by Hugh Carey | Member of the U.S. House of Representatives from New York's 12th congressional district 1963–1969 | Succeeded by Shirley Chisholm |
Party political offices
| Preceded by Chase Woodhouse | Secretary of the House Democratic Caucus; 1953–1957 | Succeeded by Leonor Sullivan |
| Preceded by Leonor Sullivan | Secretary of the House Democratic Caucus; 1964–1965 | Succeeded by Leonor Sullivan |
