= Louis E. Miller =

American politician (1899–1952)

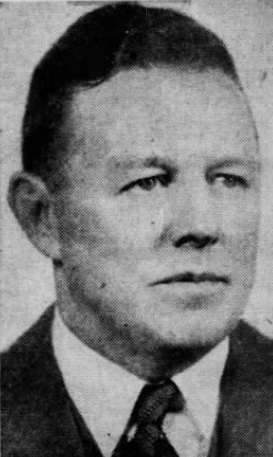

Member of the U.S. House of Representatives from Missouri's 11th district
- In office January 3, 1943 – January 3, 1945
- Preceded by: John B. Sullivan
- Succeeded by: John B. Sullivan

Personal details
- Born: Louis Ebenezer Miller; April 30, 1899 Willisburg, Kentucky, U.S.
- Died: November 1, 1952 (aged 53) St. Louis, Missouri, U.S.
- Resting place: Calvary Cemetery
- Party: Republican
- Education: Saint Mary's College (BA); Saint Louis University (JD)
- Profession: Lawyer

Louis Ebenezer Miller (April 30, 1899 – November 1, 1952) was a U.S. representative from Missouri.

Born in Willisburg, Washington County, Kentucky, Miller attended the grade schools of Washington County, Kentucky, Springfield (Kentucky) High School, and St. Mary's College, St. Marys, Kansas. During World War I, he served as a private. He graduated from the St. Louis University School of Law, St. Louis, Missouri, in 1921. He was admitted to the bar the same year and commenced practice in St. Louis, Missouri. He served as a member of the Republican city central committee of St. Louis from 1936 to 1942. He served as a member of the advisory council of the Republican National Committee in 1943. He served as a delegate to the 1940 Republican National Convention.

Miller was elected as a Republican to the Seventy-eighth Congress (January 3, 1943 – January 3, 1945). He was an unsuccessful candidate for reelection in 1944 to the Seventy-ninth Congress. He continued the practice of law in St. Louis, Missouri, until his death there November 1, 1952. He was interred in Calvary Cemetery.

U.S. House of Representatives
Preceded by John B. Sullivan	Member of the U.S. House of Representatives from Missouri's 11th congressional district 1943–1945	Succeeded by John B. Sullivan
