= List of United States senators in the 54th Congress =

This is a complete list of United States senators during the 54th United States Congress listed by seniority from March 4, 1895, to March 3, 1897.

Order of service is based on the commencement of the senator's first term. Behind this is former service as a senator (only giving the senator seniority within their new incoming class), service as vice president, a House member, a cabinet secretary, or a governor of a state. The final factor is the population of the senator's state.

Senators who were sworn in during the middle of the Congress (up until the last senator who was not sworn in early after winning the November 1896 election) are listed at the end of the list with no number.

== Terms of service ==
Class	Terms of service of senators that expired in years
Class 3	Terms of service of senators that expired in 1897 (AL, AR, CA, CO, CT, FL, GA, IA, ID, IL, IN, KS, KY, LA, MD, MO, NC, ND, NH, NV, NY, OH, OR, PA, SC, SD, UT, VT, WA, and WI.)
Class 1	Terms of service of senators that expired in 1899 (CA, CT, DE, FL, IN, MA, MD, ME, MI, MN, MO, MS, MT, ND, NE, NJ, NV, NY, OH, PA, RI, TN, TX, UT, VA, VT, WA, WI, WV, and WY.)
Class 2	Terms of service of senators that expired in 1901 (AL, AR, CO, DE, GA, IA, ID, IL, KS, KY, LA, MA, ME, MI, MN, MS, MT, NC, NE, NH, NJ, OR, RI, SC, SD, TN, TX, VA, WV, and WY.)

== U.S. Senate seniority list ==
U.S. Senate seniority
Rank	Senator (party-state)	Seniority date	Other factors
1	Justin S. Morrill (R-VT)	March 4, 1867	Former representative, former governor
2	William B. Allison (R-IA)	March 4, 1873	Former representative
3	John P. Jones (R-NV)	March 4, 1873	
4	Francis Cockrell (D-MO)	March 4, 1875	
5	George F. Hoar (R-MA)	March 4, 1877	Former representative
6	Isham G. Harris (D-TN)	March 4, 1877	Former representative, former governor
7	John T. Morgan (D-AL)	March 4, 1877	
8	J. Donald Cameron (R-PA)	March 20, 1877	
9	Daniel W. Voorhees (D-IN)	November 6, 1877	
10	George G. Vest (D-MO)	March 4, 1879	Missouri 5th in population (1870)
11	Orville H. Platt (R-CT)	March 4, 1879	Connecticut 25th in population (1870)
12	Wilkinson Call (D-FL)	March 4, 1879	Florida 33rd in population (1870)
13	James L. Pugh (D-AL)	November 24, 1880	
14	John Sherman (R-OH)	March 4, 1881	Previously a senator
15	Eugene Hale (R-ME)	March 4, 1881	Former representative (10 years)
16	Joseph R. Hawley (R-CT)	March 4, 1881	Former representative (5 years)
17	James Z. George (D-MS)	March 4, 1881	Mississippi 18th in population (1870)
18	Arthur P. Gorman (D-MD)	March 4, 1881	Maryland 20th in population (1870)
19	William P. Frye (R-ME)	March 18, 1881	
20	Nelson W. Aldrich (R-RI)	October 5, 1881	
21	Shelby M. Cullom (R-IL)	March 4, 1883	
22	Henry M. Teller (R-CO)	March 4, 1885	Previously a senator
23	J. C. S. Blackburn (D-KY)	March 4, 1885	Former representative
24	James K. Jones (D-AR)	March 4, 1885	
25	George Gray (D-DE)	March 18, 1885	
26	James H. Berry (D-AR)	March 20, 1885	
27	John H. Mitchell (R-OR)	November 18, 1885	
28	William M. Stewart (R-NV)	March 4, 1887	Previously a senator (11 years)
29	David Turpie (D-IN)	March 4, 1887	Previously a senator (1 month)
30	John W. Daniel (D-VA)	March 4, 1887	Former representative
31	William B. Bate (D-TN)	March 4, 1887	Former governor, Tennessee 12th in population (1880)
32	Cushman K. Davis (R-MN)	March 4, 1887	Former governor, Minnesota 26th in population (1880)
33	Matthew Quay (R-PA)	March 4, 1887	Pennsylvania 2nd in population (1880)
34	Charles J. Faulkner (D-WV)	March 4, 1887	West Virginia 29th in population (1880)
35	Samuel Pasco (D-FL)	May 19, 1887	
36	James McMillan (R-MI)	March 4, 1889	Michigan 9th in population (1880)
37	Edward O. Wolcott (R-CO)	March 4, 1889	Colorado 35th in population (1880)
38	William E. Chandler (R-NH)	June 18, 1889	
39	Richard F. Pettigrew (SR-SD)	November 2, 1889	
40	Watson C. Squire (R-WA)	November 20, 1889	
41	George L. Shoup (R-ID)	December 18, 1890	
42	John B. Gordon (D-GA)	March 4, 1891	Previously a senator
43	Jacob H. Gallinger (R-NH)	March 4, 1891	Former representative (4 years)
44	Henry C. Hansbrough (R-ND)	March 4, 1891	Former representative (2 years)
45	Fred Dubois (R-ID)	March 4, 1891	Former delegate
46	William F. Vilas (D-WI)	March 4, 1891	Former cabinet member
47	John M. Palmer (D-IL)	March 4, 1891	Former governor
48	Calvin S. Brice (D-OH)	March 4, 1891	Ohio 3rd in population (1880)
49	William A. Peffer (PP-KS)	March 4, 1891	Kansas 20th in population (1880)
50	John L. M. Irby (D-SC)	March 4, 1891	South Carolina 21st in population (1880)
51	James H. Kyle (R-SD)	March 4, 1891	South Dakota 37th in population (1880)
52	Redfield Proctor (R-VT)	November 2, 1891	
53	Charles H. Gibson (D-MD)	November 19, 1891	
54	David B. Hill (D-NY)	January 7, 1892	
55	Roger Q. Mills (D-TX)	March 29, 1892	
56	Donelson Caffery (D-LA)	December 31, 1892	
57	William Lindsay (D-KY)	February 15, 1893	
58	Henry Cabot Lodge (R-MA)	March 4, 1893	Former representative (6 years)
59	John L. Mitchell (D-WI)	March 4, 1893	Former representative (2 years)
60	Edward Murphy Jr. (D-NY)	March 4, 1893	New York 1st in population (1890)
61	James Smith Jr. (D-NJ)	March 4, 1893	New Jersey 18th in population (1890)
62	Stephen M. White (D-CA)	March 4, 1893	California 22nd in population (1890)
63	William V. Allen (PP-NE)	March 4, 1893	Nebraska 26th in population (1890)
64	William N. Roach (D-ND)	March 4, 1893	North Dakota 41st in population (1890)
65	George C. Perkins (R-CA)	July 26, 1893	
66	Newton C. Blanchard (D-LA)	March 12, 1894	
67	Lee Mantle (SR-MT)	January 16, 1895	
68	Julius C. Burrows (R-MI)	January 23, 1895	
69	Clarence D. Clark (R-WY)	January 24, 1895	Former representative
70	Jeter C. Pritchard (R-NC)	January 24, 1895	
71	John L. Wilson (R-WA)	February 19, 1895	
72	Edward C. Walthall (D-MS)	March 4, 1895	Previously a senator (9 years)
73	William J. Sewell (R-NJ)	March 4, 1895	Previously a senator (6 years)
74	Francis E. Warren (R-WY)	March 4, 1895	Previously a senator (3 years)
75	Horace Chilton (D-TX)	March 4, 1895	Previously a senator (2 years)
76	Thomas H. Carter (R-MT)	March 4, 1895	Former delegate, former representative
77	Stephen B. Elkins (R-WV)	March 4, 1895	Former delegate, former cabinet member
78	John H. Gear (R-IA)	March 4, 1895	Former governor, Iowa 10th in population (1890)
79	Knute Nelson (R-MN)	March 4, 1895	Former governor, Minnesota 20th in population (1890)
80	Benjamin Tillman (D-SC)	March 4, 1895	Former governor, South Carolina 23rd in population (1890)
81	George P. Wetmore (R-RI)	March 4, 1895	Former governor, Rhode Island 36th in population (1890)
82	Augustus O. Bacon (D-GA)	March 4, 1895	Georgia 12th in population (1890)
83	Thomas S. Martin (D-VA)	March 4, 1895	Virginia 15th in population (1890)
84	Marion Butler (PP-NC)	March 4, 1895	North Carolina 16th in population (1890)
85	Lucien Baker (R-KS)	March 4, 1895	Kansas 19th in population (1890)
86	John M. Thurston (R-NE)	March 4, 1895	Nebraska 26th in population (1890)
87	George W. McBride (R-OR)	March 4, 1895	Oregon 38th in population (1890)
88	Arthur Brown (R-UT)	January 22, 1896	
89	Frank J. Cannon (R-UT)	January 22, 1896	
90	Richard R. Kenney (R-DE)	January 19, 1897	

== See also ==
- 54th United States Congress
- List of United States representatives in the 54th Congress
