= John B. Sullivan =

American politician (1897–1951)

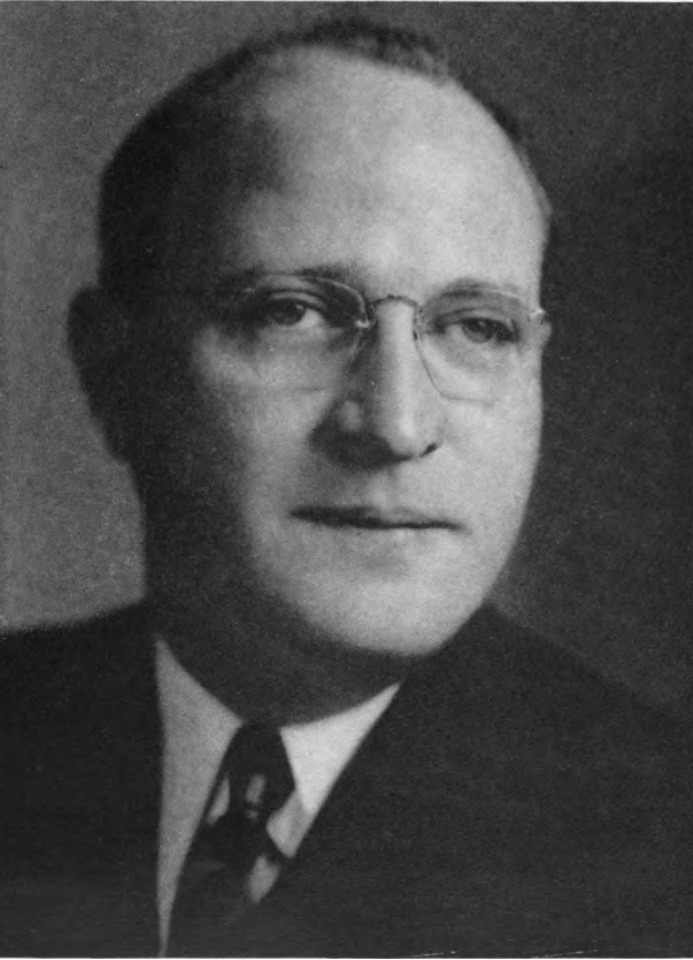

Member of the U.S. House of Representatives from Missouri's 11th district
- In office January 3, 1949 – January 29, 1951
- Preceded by: Claude I. Bakewell
- Succeeded by: Claude I. Bakewell
- In office January 3, 1945 – January 3, 1947
- Preceded by: Louis E. Miller
- Succeeded by: Claude I. Bakewell
- In office January 3, 1941 – January 3, 1943
- Preceded by: Thomas C. Hennings Jr.
- Succeeded by: Louis E. Miller

Personal details
- Born: John Berchmans Sullivan; October 10, 1897 Sedalia, Missouri, U.S.
- Died: January 29, 1951 (aged 53) Bethesda, Maryland, U.S.
- Resting place: Calvary Cemetery
- Party: Democratic
- Spouse: Leonor Kretzer (m. 1941)
- Education: Saint Louis University (BA, JD)
- Profession: Lawyer

John Berchmans Sullivan (October 10, 1897 – January 29, 1951) was a member of the United States House of Representatives from Missouri. He was a Democrat. He was married to Leonor Kretzer Sullivan.

== Biography ==
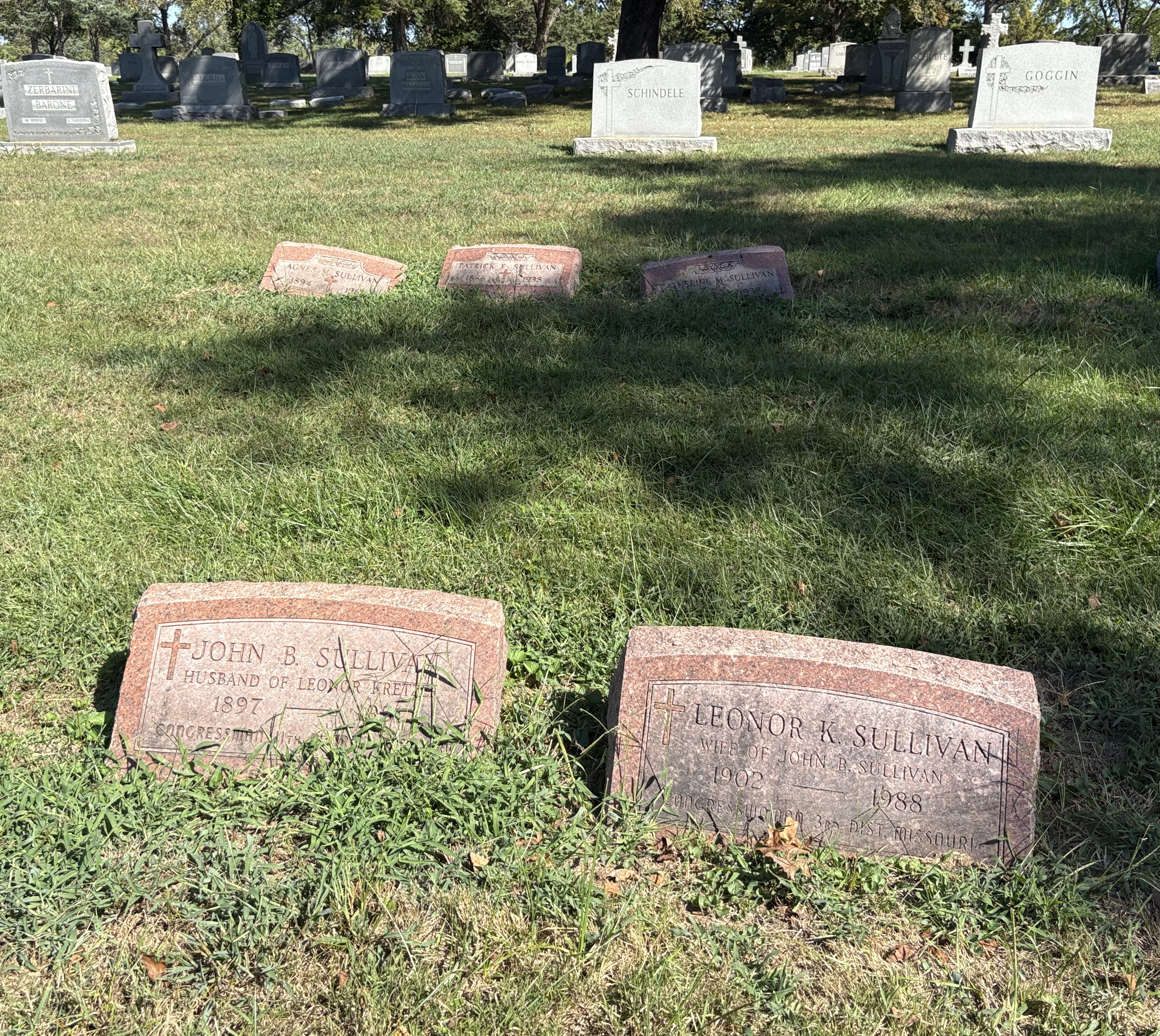
Graves of John and Leonor Sullivan at Calvary Cemetery

Sullivan was born in Sedalia and moved to St. Louis, Missouri, at the age of 13. He attended parochial schools in Sedalia and St. Louis and graduated from Saint Louis University in 1918. During World War I he enlisted in the Army and served as a private in the infantry. He received his J.D. degree from Saint Louis University School of Law in 1922 and began working in private practice. He also became active in state and local politics.

From 1936 to 1938 he served as associate city counselor in St. Louis and from 1938 to 1940 he served as secretary to Mayor Bernard F. Dickmann. In 1940 he was elected to Congress. He was defeated in a bid for re-election in 1942, but was again elected to Congress in 1944. He was again defeated in 1946, but made another come-back in 1948. In 1950 he was re-elected. He died January 29, 1951, of a cerebral hemorrhage and was buried at Calvary Cemetery in St. Louis. In 1952 his widow Leonor Sullivan was elected to Congress and served until her retirement in 1976.

== See also ==
- List of members of the United States Congress who died in office (1950–1999)

U.S. House of Representatives
Preceded by Vacant	Member of the U.S. House of Representatives from Missouri's 11th congressional district 1941–1943	Succeeded by Louis E. Miller
Preceded by Louis E. Miller	Member of the U.S. House of Representatives from Missouri's 11th congressional district 1945–1947	Succeeded by Claude I. Bakewell
Preceded by Claude I. Bakewell	Member of the U.S. House of Representatives from Missouri's 11th congressional district 1949–1951	Succeeded by Claude I. Bakewell
