= Dorsey W. Shackleford =

American politician (1853–1936)

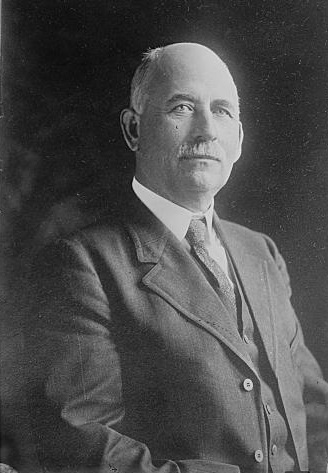
- Shackleford c. 1917

Member of the U.S. House of Representatives from Missouri's 8th district
- In office August 29, 1899 – March 3, 1919
- Preceded by: Richard P. Bland
- Succeeded by: William L. Nelson

Personal details
- Born: August 27, 1853 near Sweet Springs, Missouri, US
- Died: July 15, 1936 (aged 82) Jefferson City, Missouri, US
- Party: Democratic
- Profession: lawyer

Dorsey William Shackleford (August 27, 1853 – July 15, 1936) was a United States representative from Missouri.

== Early life ==
Shackleford was born in Sweet Springs, Missouri. He attended public schools and William Jewell College, Liberty, Missouri where he studied law. He taught school from 1877 to 1879.

== Career ==
He was admitted to the bar in 1878 and commenced practice in Boonville, Missouri. He served as prosecuting attorney of Cooper County, Missouri from 1882 to 1886 and from 1890 to 1892. He served as judge of the fourteenth judicial circuit of Missouri from June 1, 1892, until his resignation on September 9, 1899, having been elected to Congress.

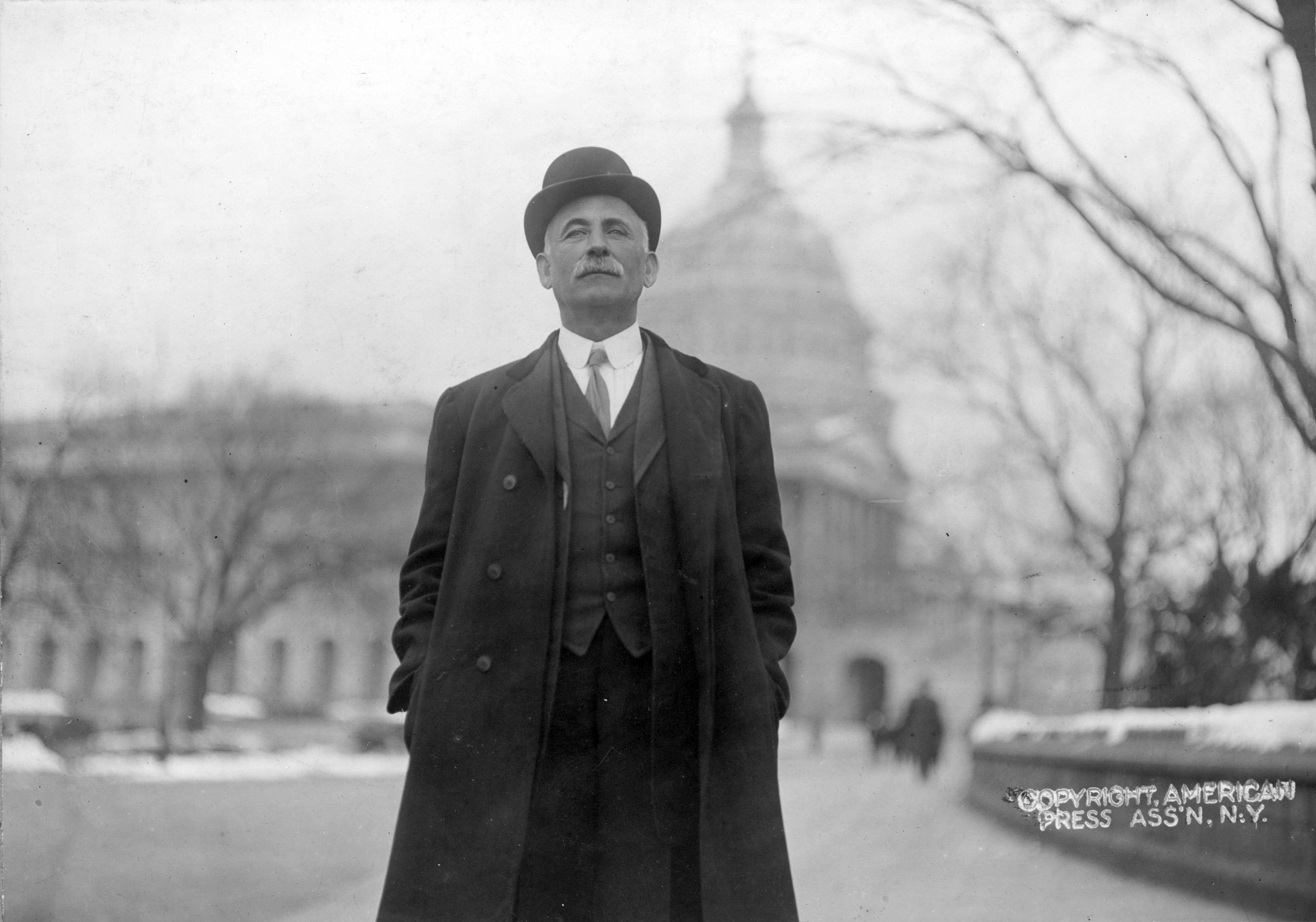
Congressman Dorsey W. Shackleford, standing in front of the U.S. Capitol, 1911

Shackleford was elected as a Democratic Representative to the Fifty-sixth Congress to fill the vacancy caused by the death of Richard P. Bland. He was re-elected to the Fifty-seventh and to the eight succeeding Congresses and served from August 29, 1899, to March 3, 1919.

He served as chairman of the Committee on Roads (sixty-third to sixty-fifth Congresses) and introduced legislation that would ultimately be enacted as the Federal Aid Road Act of 1916. On April 5, 1917, he voted against declaring war on Germany. He was an unsuccessful candidate for renomination in 1918 to the Sixty-sixth Congress. He moved to Jefferson City, Missouri, in 1919 and continued the practice of law. He died in Jefferson City, Missouri, July 15, 1936. He was interred in Walnut Grove Cemetery, Boonville, Missouri.

U.S. House of Representatives
Preceded by Richard P. Bland	Member of the U.S. House of Representatives from Missouri's 8th congressional district 1899–1919	Succeeded by William L. Nelson
