= John J. O'Neill (American politician) =

American politician (1846–1898)

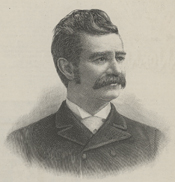
- John Joseph O'Neill, 1892 portrait

Member of the U.S. House of Representatives from Missouri's 11th district
- In office April 3, 1894 – March 3, 1895
- Preceded by: Charles F. Joy
- Succeeded by: Charles F. Joy

Member of the U.S. House of Representatives from Missouri's 8th district
- In office March 4, 1891 – March 3, 1893
- Preceded by: Frederick G. Niedringhaus
- Succeeded by: Richard P. Bland
- In office March 4, 1883 – March 3, 1889
- Preceded by: Robert T. Van Horn
- Succeeded by: Frederick G. Niedringhaus

Member of the Missouri House of Representatives
- In office 1872–1878

Personal details
- Born: John Joseph O'Neill; June 25, 1846 St. Louis, Missouri, U.S.
- Died: February 19, 1898 (aged 51) St. Louis, Missouri, U.S.
- Resting place: Calvary Cemetery
- Party: Democratic
- Profession: Politician, lawyer

John Joseph O'Neill (June 25, 1846 – February 19, 1898) was a U.S. representative from Missouri.

== Biography ==
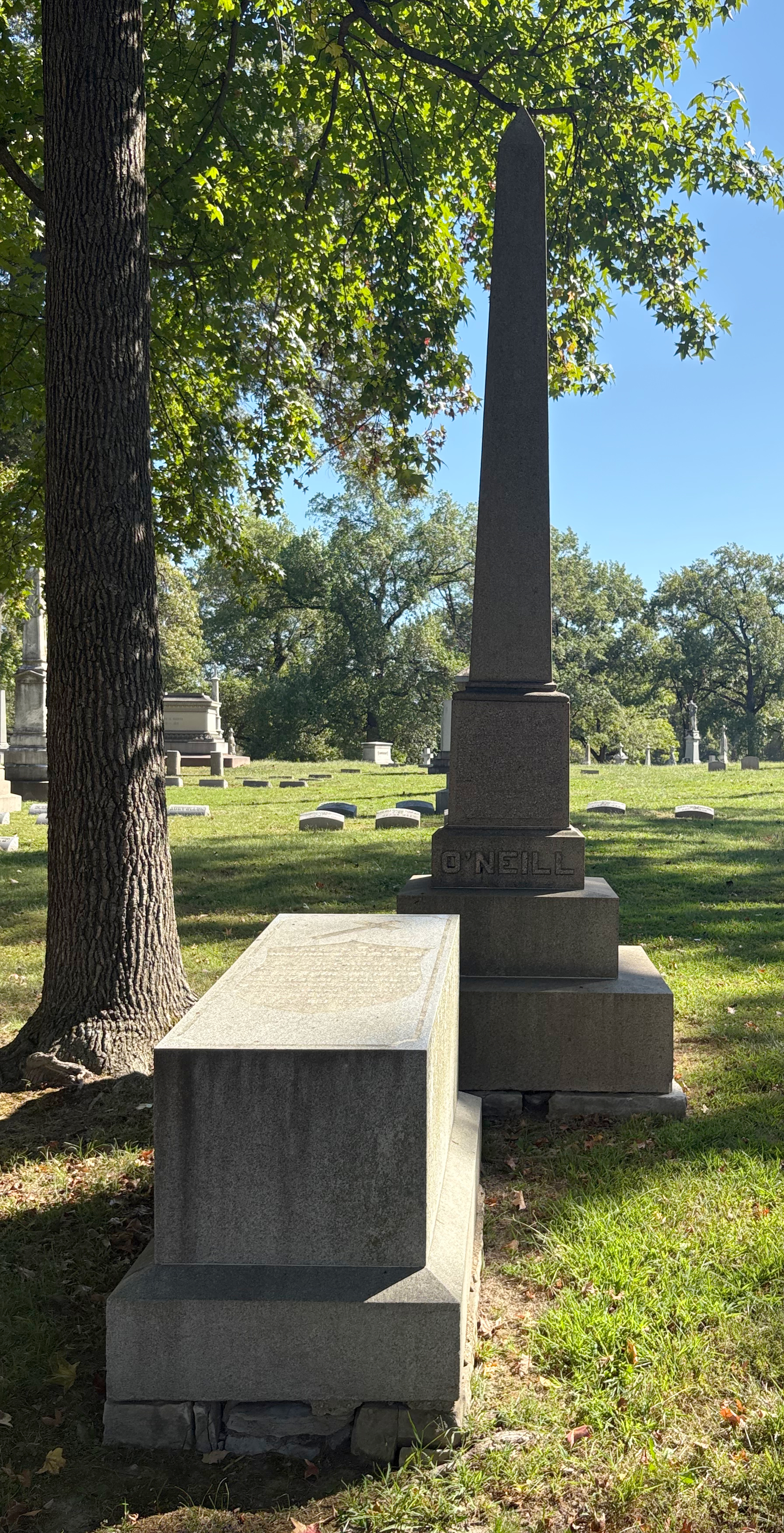
O'Neill's grave at Calvary Cemetery

Born in St. Louis, Missouri, O'Neill attended the common schools. He studied law. He was admitted to the bar in 1870 and commenced practice in St. Louis. He engaged in the manufacture of gold pens. He served as a member of the Missouri House of Representatives from 1872 to 1878. He served as a member of the municipal assembly from 1879 to 1881.

O'Neill was elected as a Democrat to the Forty-eighth, Forty-ninth, and Fiftieth Congresses (March 4, 1883 – March 3, 1889). He served as chairman of the Committee on Expenditures on Public Buildings (Forty-ninth Congress), Committee on Labor (Forty-ninth and Fiftieth Congresses). He was an unsuccessful candidate for reelection in 1888 to the Fifty-first Congress.

O'Neill was elected to the Fifty-second Congress (March 4, 1891 – March 3, 1893). He successfully contested the election of Charles F. Joy to the Fifty-third Congress (April 3, 1894 – March 3, 1895). He was not a candidate for renomination in 1894. He resumed the practice of law. He died in St. Louis, Missouri, February 19, 1898. He was interred in Calvary Cemetery.

U.S. House of Representatives
Preceded by Robert T. Van Horn	Member of the U.S. House of Representatives from Missouri's 8th congressional district 1883–1889	Succeeded by Frederick G. Niedringhaus
Preceded by Frederick G. Niedringhaus	Member of the U.S. House of Representatives from Missouri's 8th congressional district 1891–1893	Succeeded by Richard P. Bland
Preceded by Charles F. Joy	Member of the U.S. House of Representatives from Missouri's 11th congressional district 1894–1895	Succeeded by Charles F. Joy
