= Charles F. Joy =

American politician (1849–1921)

Charles Frederick Joy
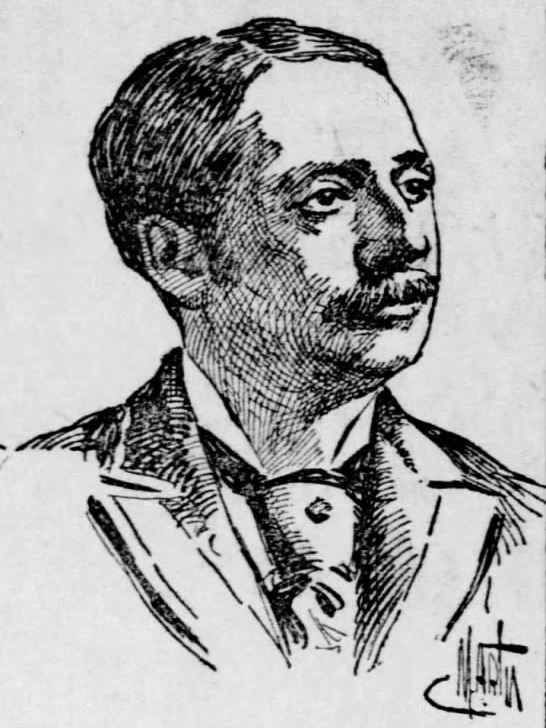
- St. Louis Post-Dispatch, April 22, 1896

Member of the U.S. House of Representatives from Missouri's 11th district
- In office March 4, 1893 – April 3, 1894
- Preceded by: Richard P. Bland
- Succeeded by: John J. O'Neill
- In office March 4, 1895 – March 3, 1903
- Preceded by: John J. O'Neill
- Succeeded by: John T. Hunt

Personal details
- Born: December 11, 1849 Jacksonville, Illinois, U.S.
- Died: April 13, 1921 (aged 71) St. Louis, Missouri, U.S.
- Party: Republican
- Spouses: Arabel Ordway (m. 1879, died) Elizabeth Ina Grant (m. 1895)
- Education: Yale College
- Occupation: Lawyer, politician

Charles Frederick Joy (December 11, 1849 – April 13, 1921) was a U.S. representative from Missouri.

== Biography ==
Born in Jacksonville, Illinois on December 11, 1849, Joy attended the public schools. He was graduated from Yale College in 1874.

He studied law, and was admitted to the bar and commenced practice in St. Louis, Missouri in 1876. He was presented credentials as a Republican Member-elect to the Fifty-third Congress and served until April 3, 1894, when he was succeeded by John J. O'Neill, who contested the election.

He married Arabel Ordway in Salem, Connecticut on 1879. She died during the birth of their only child.

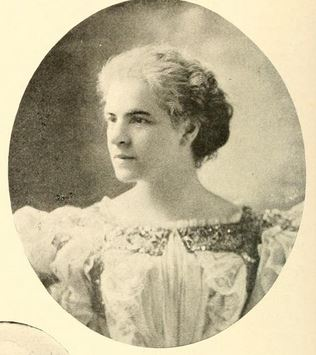
Elizabeth Ina Grant

He remarried, to Elizabeth Ina Grant, a native of Boston Highlands, Massachusetts. She descended from the Grants and Lennoxes of England, and spent the greater part of her girlhood abroad, returning to Boston in 1872. Since 1889 her family resided in California, where, on May 11, 1895, she and Charles F. Joy were married in San Mateo.

Joy was elected to the Fifty-fourth and to the three succeeding Congresses (March 4, 1895 – March 3, 1903). He was an unsuccessful candidate for renomination in 1902. He resumed the practice of his profession in St. Louis. He served as recorder of deeds from 1907 until March 22, 1921, when he resigned. He died in St. Louis, Missouri, on April 13, 1921. His remains were cremated and placed in Elks Rest at Bellefontaine Cemetery.

U.S. House of Representatives
| Preceded by Richard P. Bland | Member of the U.S. House of Representatives from Missouri's 11th congressional district 1893–1894 | Succeeded by John J. O'Neill |
| Preceded by John J. O'Neill | Member of the U.S. House of Representatives from Missouri's 11th congressional district 1895–1903 | Succeeded by John T. Hunt |
