= Missouri's 11th congressional district =

Former U.S. House district

- Obsolete district
- Created: 1870; 1935
- Eliminated: 1930; 1960
- Years active: 1873-1933; 1935-1963

The 11th congressional district of Missouri was a congressional district for the United States House of Representatives in Missouri from 1873 to 1963.

== List of members representing the district ==
Member	Party	Years	Cong ress	Electoral history
District created March 4, 1873
John B. Clark Jr. (Fayette)	Democratic	March 4, 1873 – March 3, 1883	43rd 44th 45th 46th 47th	Elected in 1872. Re-elected in 1874. Re-elected in 1876. Re-elected in 1878. Re-elected in 1880. Lost renomination.
Richard P. Bland (Lebanon)	Democratic	March 4, 1883 – March 3, 1893	48th 49th 50th 51st 52nd	Redistricted from the 5th district and re-elected in 1882. Re-elected in 1884. Re-elected in 1886. Re-elected in 1888. Re-elected in 1890. Redistricted to the 8th district.
Charles F. Joy (St. Louis)	Republican	March 4, 1893 – April 3, 1894	53rd	Elected in 1892. Lost contested election.
John J. O'Neill (St. Louis)	Democratic	April 3, 1894 – March 3, 1895	53rd	Won contested election. Retired.
Charles F. Joy (St. Louis)	Republican	March 4, 1895 – March 3, 1903	54th 55th 56th 57th	Elected in 1894. Re-elected in 1896. Re-elected in 1898. Re-elected in 1900. Lost renomination.
John T. Hunt (St. Louis)	Democratic	March 4, 1903 – March 3, 1907	58th 59th	Elected in 1902. Re-elected in 1904. Lost re-election.
Henry S. Caulfield (St. Louis)	Republican	March 4, 1907 – March 3, 1909	60th	Elected in 1906. Retired.
Patrick F. Gill (St. Louis)	Democratic	March 4, 1909 – March 3, 1911	61st	Elected in 1908. Lost re-election.
Theron E. Catlin (St. Louis)	Republican	March 4, 1911 – August 12, 1912	62nd	Elected in 1910. Lost contested election.
Patrick F. Gill (St. Louis)	Democratic	August 12, 1912 – March 3, 1913	62nd	Won contested election. Lost renomination.
William L. Igoe (St. Louis)	Democratic	March 4, 1913 – March 3, 1921	63rd 64th 65th 66th	Elected in 1912. Re-elected in 1914. Re-elected in 1916. Re-elected in 1918. Retired.
Harry B. Hawes (St. Louis)	Democratic	March 4, 1921 – October 15, 1926	67th 68th 69th	Elected in 1920. Re-elected in 1922. Re-elected in 1924. Resigned to run for U.S. senator.
Vacant		October 15, 1926 – November 2, 1926	69th	
John J. Cochran (St. Louis)	Democratic	November 2, 1926 – March 3, 1933	69th 70th 71st 72nd	Elected to finish Hawes's term. Re-elected in 1926. Re-elected in 1928. Re-elected in 1930. Redistricted to the at-large district.
District inactive		March 4, 1933 – January 3, 1935	73rd	All representatives elected at-large.
Thomas C. Hennings Jr. (St. Louis)	Democratic	January 3, 1935 – December 31, 1940	74th 75th 76th	Elected in 1934. Re-elected in 1936. Re-elected in 1938. Retired and resigned early to become a candidate for circuit attorney of St. Louis.
Vacant		December 31, 1940 – January 3, 1941	76th	
John B. Sullivan (St. Louis)	Democratic	January 3, 1941 – January 3, 1943	77th	Elected in 1940. Lost re-election.
Louis E. Miller (St. Louis)	Republican	January 3, 1943 – January 3, 1945	78th	Elected in 1942. Lost re-election.
John B. Sullivan (St. Louis)	Democratic	January 3, 1945 – January 3, 1947	79th	Elected in 1944. Lost re-election.
Claude I. Bakewell (St. Louis)	Republican	January 3, 1947 – January 3, 1949	80th	Elected in 1946. Lost re-election.
John B. Sullivan (St. Louis)	Democratic	January 3, 1949 – January 29, 1951	81st 82nd	Elected in 1948. Re-elected in 1950. Died.
Vacant		January 29, 1951 – March 9, 1951	82nd	
Claude I. Bakewell (St. Louis)	Republican	March 9, 1951 – January 3, 1953	82nd	Elected to finish Sullivan's term. Redistricted to the 3rd district and lost re-election.
Morgan M. Moulder (Camdenton)	Democratic	January 3, 1953 – January 3, 1963	83rd 84th 85th 86th 87th	Redistricted from the 2nd district and re-elected in 1952. Re-elected in 1954. Re-elected in 1956. Re-elected in 1958. Re-elected in 1960. Retired.
District eliminated January 3, 1963
