= Joel D. Hubbard =

American politician

Joel Douglas Hubbard
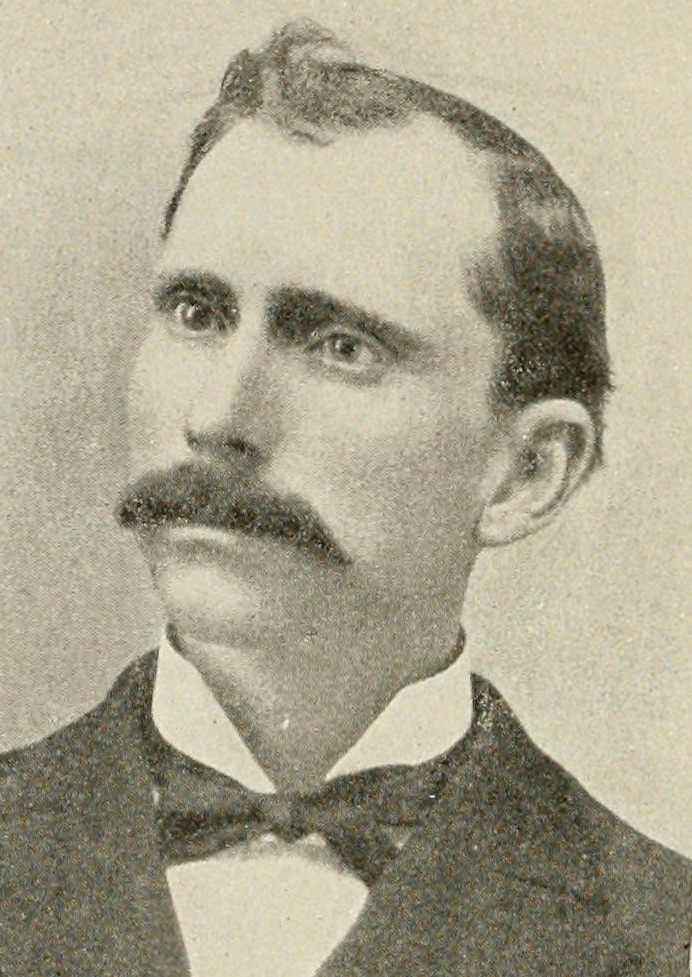

Member of the U.S. House of Representatives from Missouri's 8th district
- In office March 4, 1895 – March 4, 1897
- Preceded by: Richard P. Bland
- Succeeded by: Richard P. Bland

Personal details
- Born: November 6, 1860 near Marshall, Missouri, US
- Died: May 26, 1919 (aged 58) Tampa, Florida, US
- Party: Republican
- Education: Missouri Medical College
- Profession: lawyer

Joel Douglas Hubbard (November 6, 1860 – May 26, 1919) was a U.S. representative from Missouri.

Born near Marshall, Missouri, Hubbard attended public schools and Central College, Fayette, Missouri. He graduated from Missouri Medical College at St. Louis in 1882 and practiced medicine in Syracuse, Missouri, until 1886. Hubbard served as a County clerk from 1886 to 1894.

Hubbard was elected as a Republican to the Fifty-fourth Congress (March 4, 1895 – March 4, 1897). However, he was an unsuccessful candidate for reelection in 1896 to the Fifty-fifth Congress. Having studied law, he was admitted to the Missouri bar in 1899 and commenced practice in Versailles, Missouri. He also engaged in the banking business. He practiced medicine in Sedalia, Missouri, in 1904 and 1905. He returned to Versailles and resumed the practice of law and his banking interests. He moved to El Paso, Texas, in 1917 and continued to practice law. He died in Tampa, Florida, on May 26, 1919. He was interred in Versailles Cemetery, Versailles, Missouri.

U.S. House of Representatives
| Preceded by Richard P. Bland | Member of the U.S. House of Representatives from Missouri's 8th congressional district 1895–1897 | Succeeded by Richard P. Bland |
