= Leonor Sullivan =

American politician (1902–1988)

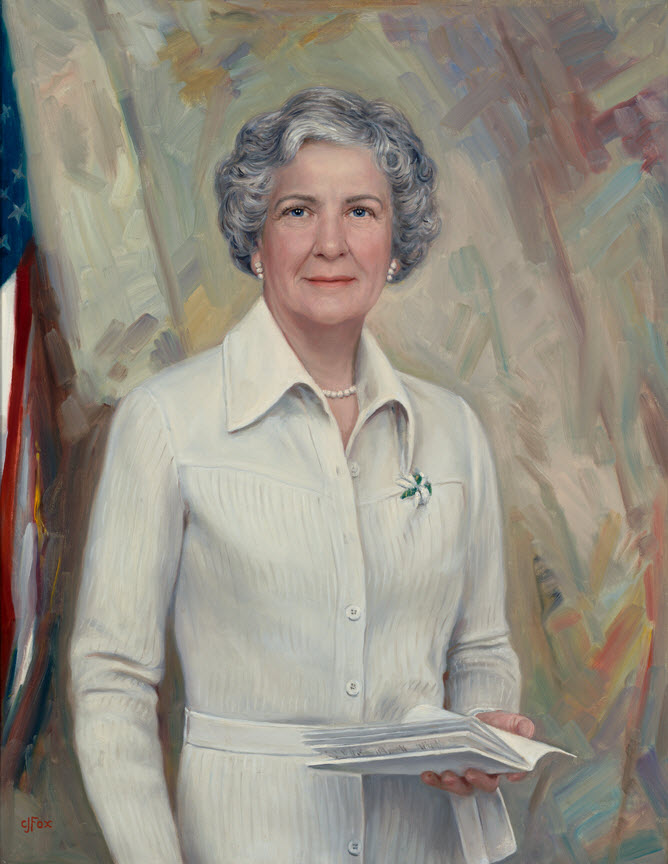
- Portrait by Irving Resnikoff (1974)

Secretary of the House Democratic Caucus
- In office January 3, 1965 – January 3, 1975
- Leader: John McCormack; Carl Albert
- Preceded by: Edna Kelly
- Succeeded by: Patsy Mink
- In office January 3, 1959 – January 7, 1964
- Leader: Sam Rayburn; John McCormack
- Preceded by: Edna Kelly
- Succeeded by: Edna Kelly

Member of the U.S. House of Representatives from Missouri's 3rd district
- In office January 3, 1953 – January 3, 1977
- Preceded by: Phil Welch
- Succeeded by: Dick Gephardt

Personal details
- Born: Leonor Kretzer; August 21, 1902 St. Louis, Missouri, U.S.
- Died: September 1, 1988 (aged 86) Sappington, Missouri, U.S.
- Resting place: Calvary Cemetery
- Party: Democratic
- Spouses: John Sullivan (m. 1941; died 1951); Russell Archibald (m. 1980)
- Education: Washington University (attended)

Leonor Kretzer Sullivan (August 21, 1902 – September 1, 1988) was an American politician who was a U.S. representative from Missouri from 1953 to 1977. A Democrat, she was the first woman in Congress from Missouri.

== Biography ==
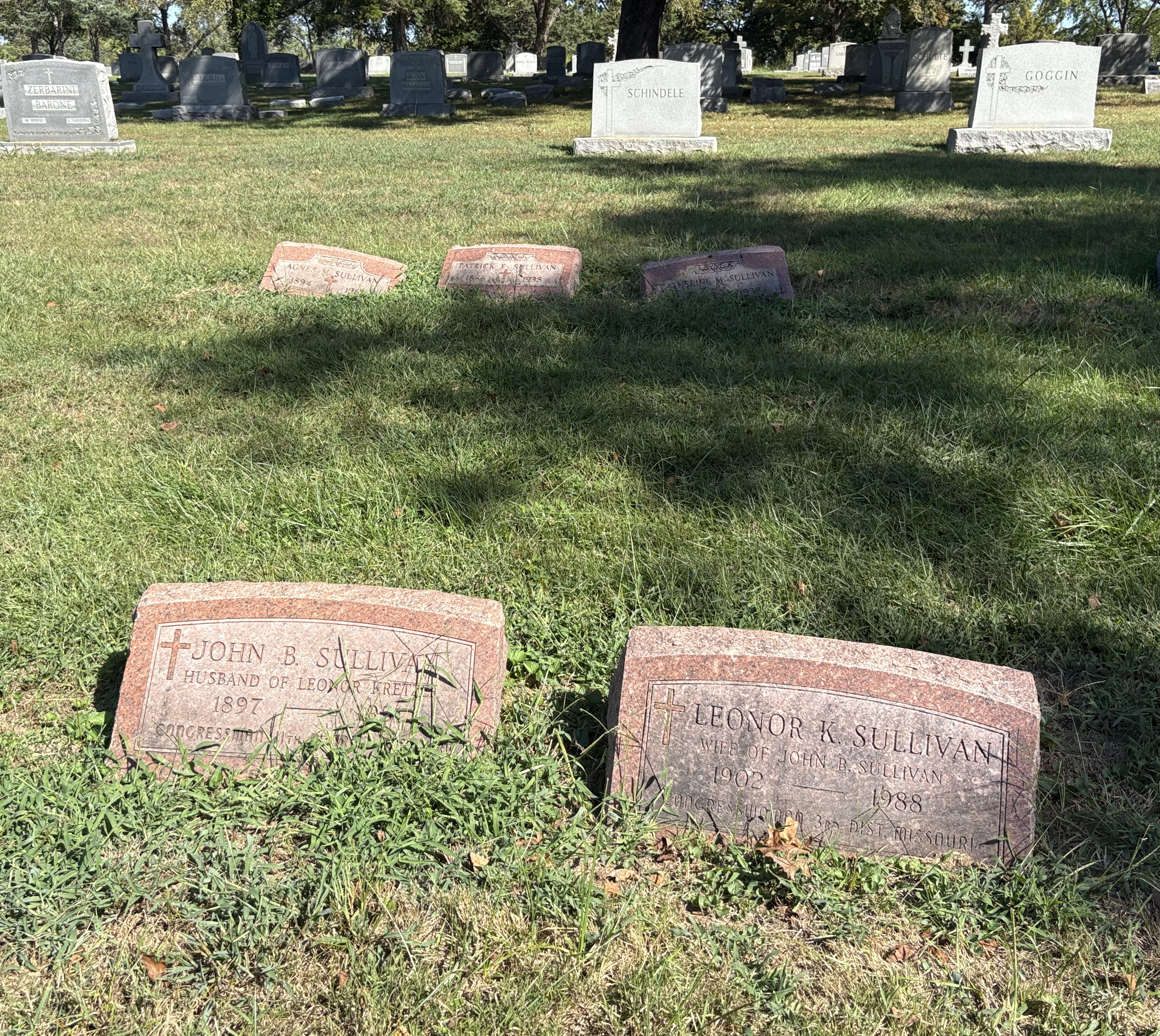
Graves of John and Leonor Sullivan at Calvary Cemetery

Born Leonor Kretzer in St. Louis, Missouri, three of her grandparents were German immigrants. Sullivan attended Washington University in St. Louis and was a teacher and director at St. Louis Comptometer school. She was married to John B. Sullivan, who served four terms in Congress, and she served as his administrative aide. Following her husband's death in 1951, she served as an aide to Congressman Leonard Irving until she left to run for Congress herself in 1952. She was re-elected eleven times. In Congress, she served for many years as Secretary of the House Democratic Caucus.

Sullivan helped create the food stamp program, which was opposed by Agriculture Secretary Ezra Taft Benson and became law in the 1960s during the Kennedy and Johnson administrations.

Sullivan did not sign the 1956 Southern Manifesto, and voted in favor of the Civil Rights Acts of 1957, 1960, 1964, and 1968, as well as the 24th Amendment to the U.S. Constitution and the Voting Rights Act of 1965.

Sullivan was one of very few members of Congress, and the only woman member of Congress, to vote against the Equal Rights Amendment for women in the early 1970s. Sullivan opposed abortion and called for the passage of the Human Life Amendment

She did not seek re-election in 1976, and was succeeded by Dick Gephardt.

In 1979, the Supersisters trading card set was produced and distributed; one of the cards featured Sullivan's name and picture.

She died at St. Anthony's Medical Center on September 1, 1988, and was buried at Calvary Cemetery in St. Louis.

The former Wharf Street in front of the Gateway Arch in Downtown St. Louis was renamed Leonor K. Sullivan Boulevard in her honor.

== See also ==
- Women in the United States House of Representatives

U.S. House of Representatives
Preceded by Phil Welch	Member of the U.S. House of Representatives from Missouri's 3rd congressional district 1953–1977	Succeeded by Dick Gephardt
Preceded by Edward Garmatz	Chair of the House Merchant Marine and Fisheries Committee; 1973–1977	Succeeded by John Murphy
Party political offices
Preceded by Edna Kelly	Secretary of the House Democratic Caucus; 1959–1964	Succeeded by Edna Kelly
Preceded by Edna Kelly	Secretary of the House Democratic Caucus; 1965–1975	Succeeded by Patsy Mink
Preceded by Mike Mansfield	Response to the State of the Union address 1972; Served alongside: Carl Albert, Lloyd Bentsen, Hale Boggs, John Brademas, Frank Church, Thomas Eagleton, Martha Griffiths, John Melcher, Ralph Metcalfe, William Proxmire	Vacant Title next held by Mike Mansfield
