= Frederick G. Niedringhaus =

American politician (1837–1922)

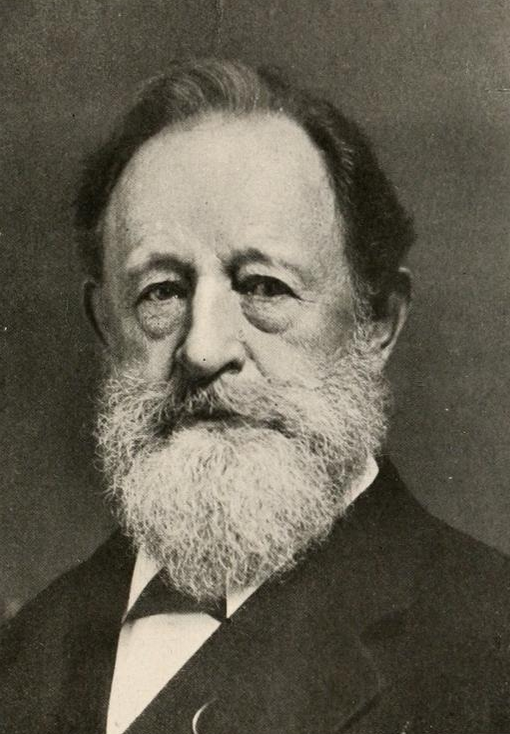
- Born: Frederick Gottlieb Niedringhaus; October 21, 1837; Lübbecke, Westphalia, Germany
- Died: November 25, 1922 (aged 85); St. Louis, Missouri, U.S.
- Burial place: Bellefontaine Cemetery
- Occupations: Businessman, politician

Frederick Gottlieb Niedringhaus (October 21, 1837 – November 25, 1922) was a German-born American businessman and politician. He served as a U.S. representative from Missouri.

== Early life ==
Niedringhaus was born on October 21, 1837, in Lübbecke, Westphalia, Germany. Niedringhaus attended the common schools there and learned the glazing, painting, and tinning trades. He emigrated to the United States in November 1855 and settled in St. Louis, Missouri.

== Career ==
With his brother William, Niedringhaus started a tinware stamping company in the early 1860s, just as the Civil War fueled demand for tin products. The brothers' business boomed, and in 1866 they founded the St. Louis Stamping Company. An initial capitalization of $125,000 allowed them to open a factory. The brothers spent long hours at the factory, "engrossed in detail of production, or absorbed in plans to capture new markets, and sometimes even taking turns at the stamping machines when rush orders piled up." With his brother, Niedringhaus developed a process for creating a decorative mottled surface on enameled metal in 1875. The process began with rolled sheet iron stamped into various shapes. Then, the ironware was dipped into an enamel and baked, creating a shiny blue-gray glaze. Because granite was used in the enameling process, the brothers called the new product Granite Ironware. They created a distribution network by making hardware stores agents for Granite Ironware. This "graniteware" became popular, and in 1877 they built a five-story brick warehouse and factory. A new rolling mill allowed them to produce sheet iron, which they had previously imported from Wales. In 1885, the company expanded to manufacture terneplate, a roofing material made of sheet iron or sheet steel coated with an alloy of lead and tin. In 1891, the brothers purchased land in Madison County, Illinois, eventually acquiring 3,500 acres. They relocated and expanded their factory, incorporating Granite City in 1896. In 1899, the St. Louis Stamping Company merged with similar businesses to form the National Enameling and Stamping Company.

Niedringhaus also became interested in various other business enterprises. In 1885, with his brother, he acquired the Calumet Mine near Stockton, Utah. The brothers also incorporated the Home Land & Cattle Company and bought a ranch at Little Dry Creek northwest of Miles City, Montana. The chose N-N as their brand, reflecting their closeness as brothers and business partners. They bought ranches on Perico Creek near the town of Clayton, New Mexico, to serve as the N-N's winter range. They later moved the ranch's northern headquarters to Prairie Elk Creek to be near the Great Northern Railway shipping point at Oswego, Montana. At its peak in the 1890s, the N-N ran up to one hundred thousand cattle at any given time, wintering them on its southern ranges and driving them north in massive cattle drives to finish them on the northern ranges. The Niedringhauses sold the ranch in 1899.

== Politics ==
Niedringhaus was elected as a Republican to the Fifty-first Congress (March 4, 1889 – March 3, 1891). During his term, he helped draft the McKinley Tariff to raise the duty on tin-plate from Wales. He was not a candidate for renomination in 1890 and resumed his former business pursuits.

== Personal life ==
On June 1, 1860, Niedringhaus married Dena Key, the daughter of a St. Louis family. The marriage produced ten children.

== Death ==
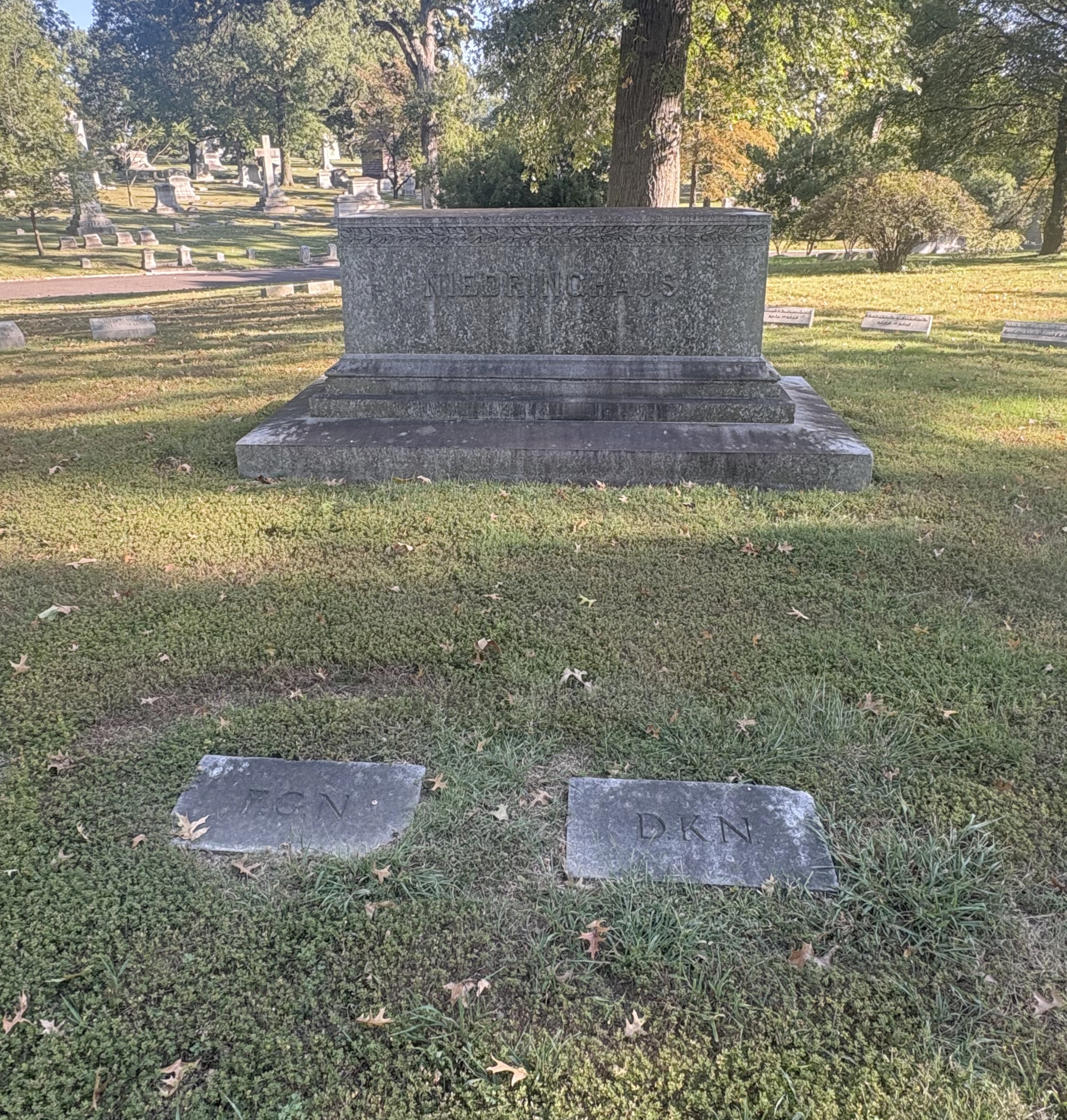
Niedringhaus's grave at Bellefontaine Cemetery

He died in St. Louis, Missouri, November 25, 1922, and was interred in Bellefontaine Cemetery.

U.S. House of Representatives
Preceded by John Joseph O'Neill	Member of the U.S. House of Representatives from Missouri's 8th congressional district 1889–1891	Succeeded by John Joseph O'Neill
