= H. C. Gilbert =

American politician

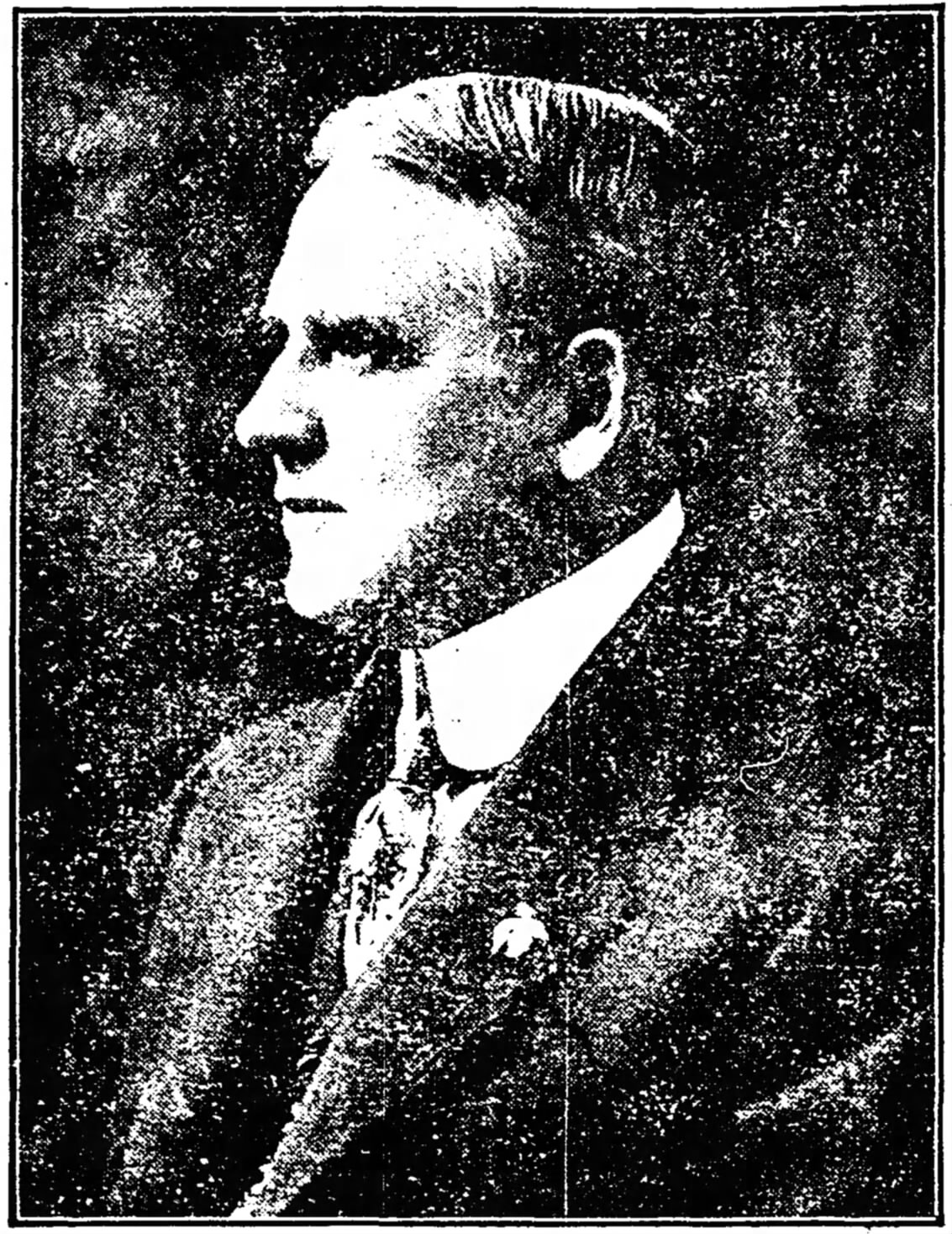
- Gilbert, ca. 1922

Member of the Arizona Senate from the Maricopa County district
- In office January 1923 – December 1924
- Preceded by: C. M. Stoddard; H. B. Wilkinson
- Succeeded by: J. J. Cox; H. A. Davis

Personal details
- Born: 1863 McDonough County, Illinois
- Died: June 11, 1939 (aged 75–76) Phoenix, Arizona
- Party: Democratic
- Spouse: Edna McClure
- Children: Sylvester Cline, Frances
- Education: Indiana University Bloomington
- Profession: Politician

H. C. Gilbert was an American politician from Arizona. He served a single term in the Arizona State Senate during the 6th Arizona State Legislature, holding one of the two seats from Maricopa County.

== Biography ==
Gilbert was born in McDonough County, Illinois in 1863. He was a graduate of Indiana University Bloomington. After graduating, he moved to Kansas City, Missouri, where he was employed by a bank. In 1888 he married Edna McClure of Kansas City, whom he remained married to until her death in 1915. The couple had two children, a son, Sylvester Cline, and a daughter, Frances. In 1890, he moved to Utah, where he was in charge of the Bear Lake and River Irrigation project, at the time the largest irrigation project in the world. He then worked on reconstructing utilities in Ogden, Salt Lake City, and Mexico City, before returning to Kansas City in 1905. While in Kansas City, he held the city assessor position, and then was the presiding judge of the Jackson County court. Gilbert came to Arizona in 1915, when he bought a ranch northwest of Phoenix, where he lived the remainder of his life.

In 1916 he was elected to the Salt River Valley Water Users' Association. In 1920, he ran for one of the two Arizona State Senate seats from Maricopa County. Along with O. S. Stapley, he won the Democrat nomination, but they both lost in the November general election to Republicans C. M. Stoddard and H. B. Wilkinson. In 1921, he led the group which organized the Salt River Valley National Farm Loan Association, part of the Federal Land Bank, which loaned millions of dollars to farmers in the Salt River Valley. Gilbert served as its first president.

In 1922 he once again ran for the State Senate, and won in the Democrat primary. While his Democrat running mate, Gene S. Cunningham, lost in the general election, Gilbert was victorious, along with Republican J. C. Phillips. Gilbert was the chairman of the Maricopa County Board of Supervisors in 1929, when the board adopted an ordinance which created the town of Tolleson. Gilbert died on June 11, 1939, in a hospital in Phoenix after an illness of about one year.
