= Celora (name) =

Celora is a given name. Notable people with this name include:

- Celora E. Martin (1834–1909), New York jurist, member of New York Supreme Court
- Celora M. Stoddard (1886–1943), Arizona politician and businessman, member of Arizona State Senate, grandson of Celora Martin
