= Charles Morelle Bruce =

American politician (1853–1938)

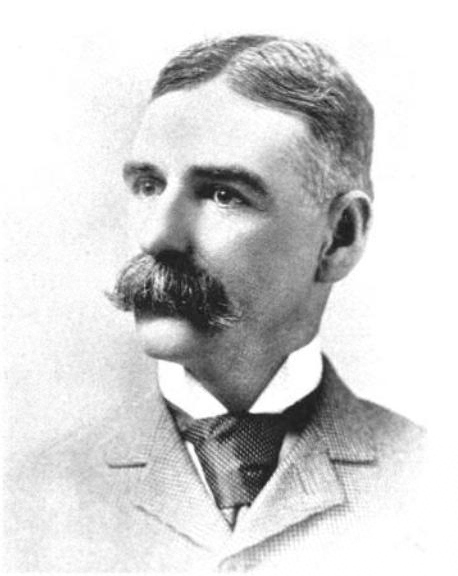

10th Secretary of Arizona Territory
- In office July 1, 1893 – July 1, 1897
- Nominated by: Grover Cleveland
- Preceded by: Nathan A. Morford
- Succeeded by: Charles H. Akers

Personal details
- Born: July 6, 1853 Staunton Hill, Virginia
- Died: June 7, 1938 (aged 84) Los Angeles, California
- Party: Democratic
- Spouse: Mary Ellen (Haly) Wright (m. 1914)

Charles Morelle Bruce (July 6, 1853 – June 7, 1938) was an American businessman and politician who served as Secretary of Arizona Territory from 1893 till 1897 and as Assistant Commissioner of the United States General Land Office from 1913 to 1921.

== Biography ==
Bruce was born on July 6, 1853, to Charles and Sally (Seddon) Bruce at his family's plantation, Staunton Hill, in Virginia. His father was one of the richest men in Virginia and served in the Senate of Virginia. His uncle, James Seddon, became Confederate States Secretary of War. His brothers included historian Philip Alexander Bruce and William Cabell Bruce would serve as a United States senator representing Maryland. Young Bruce was educated in local Virginia schools before enrolling at the University of Berlin. He studied in Germany from 1870 until 1873 during which time he met Prince Wilhelm of Prusia.

Upon completion of his education, Bruce returned to Virginia and worked in his families businesses. An invitation from some investors prompted him to visit Arizona Territory in 1880. Bruce liked what he saw well enough that he decided to stay and worked for the Washington Silver Mining Company for two years. After his time with the mining company, began working for a large cattle venture. During this time he became president of the territorial Live Stock Association.

In addition to his business interests, Bruce was also active in Democratic party politics. In 1886, he was an unsuccessful candidate for the Arizona Territorial legislature. Governor C. Meyer Zulick appointed to the territorial Livestock Sanitary Commission in April 1887. Later that year, Bruce went to Washington, D.C., successfully lobbied the United States Congress for legislation creating quarantine regulations for cattle imported from Mexico. He made another unsuccessful run for a seat in the territorial legislature in 1892.

After Grover Cleveland became President of the United States, Bruce applied to be appointed territorial secretary. His endorsements included Leland Stanford, Lloyd Tevis, Governor Philip W. McKinney of Virginia, and U.S Senator John W. Daniel. He was nominated to become Secretary of Arizona Territory on May 8, 1893. Bruce took office at the start of the fiscal year on July 1. As territorial secretary, Bruce has a significant influence on Democratic politics, being known, along with attorney general Francis J. Heney and U.S. Marshal William K. Meade, as a member of the "great triumvirate".

On April 1, 1896, Bruce received a telegram instructing him to relieve Governor L. C. Hughes from office. The territorial secretary performed his duty as instructed and served as acting governor until Governor Benjamin Joseph Franklin was sworn in on April 18. Bruce also served as acting governor on several other occasions such as when Governor Franklin took trips to California or Washington, D.C. He was replaced as territorial secretary by Charles H. Akers on July 1, 1897. The replacement angered Bruce who asked the U.S. Secretary of the Interior if he had done anything wrong. The replacement was not due to any shortcomings in his performance but was instead prompted by a new president entering the White House.

Bruce returned to Virginia in 1900 and served as manager for his family estate from 1902 until 1909. He was confirmed by the U.S. Senate to become Assistant Commissioner of the United States General Land Office on June 6, 1913. He served in that post until 1921. Bruce married Mary E. (Haly) Wright, a widow originally from Philadelphia, Pennsylvania, on January 31, 1914.

In 1927, Bruce returned to Arizona. He attempted to restart some of the mines in Tombstone but the project did not come to pass. He moved to Los Angeles, California, several years later. Bruce died in his home on June 7, 1938. His body was cremated with the cremains taken to Richmond, Virginia. Mount Bruce and Bruce Canyon in Santa Cruz County, Arizona, are named in his honor.
