= Charles Akers =

Charles Akers may refer to:

- Charlie Akers (1939–2016), American biathlete
- Charles H. Akers (1857–1924), American politician and businessman
- Charles W. Akers (1920–2009), American historian, author, and educator
