= Ernest Hall (Arizona politician) =

American politician from Arizona (1880–1959)

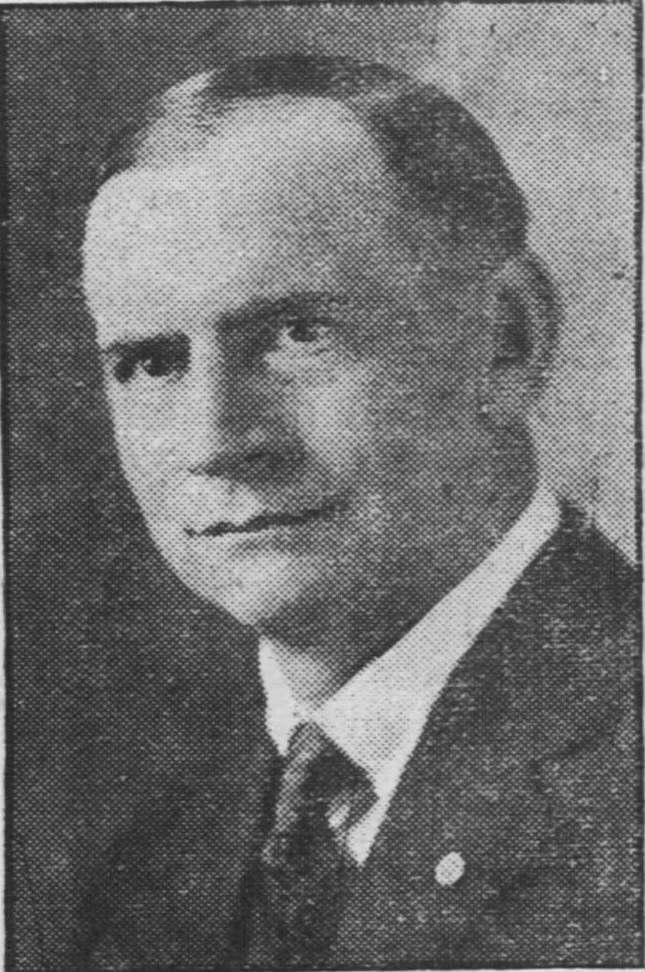
- Hall, ca. 1920

3rd Secretary of State of Arizona
- In office January 2, 1921 – January 2, 1923
- Preceded by: Mit Simms
- Succeeded by: James H. Kerby

Member of the Arizona State Senate from the Maricopa County district
- In office January 1917 – June 1918 (resigned to join U. S. Army)
- Preceded by: O. S. Stapley; Sam F. Webb
- Succeeded by: C. C. Green

Personal details
- Born: February 10, 1880 Creston, Iowa, U.S.
- Died: March 29, 1959 (aged 79) Prescott, Arizona, U.S.
- Party: Republican
- Spouse: Lillian
- Profession: Politician, farmer

Ernest R. Hall (February 10, 1880 – March 29, 1959) was an Arizona politician who served a single term in the Arizona State Senate during the 3rd Arizona State Legislature. He ran several other times for the state legislature, mostly for the State Senate, but once for the State House of Representatives. He also ran three times for Arizona Secretary of State, winning in the 1920 election. Other offices he held were justice of the peace and postmaster, both in the Salome, Arizona area. He was a combat veteran of World War I, and was a very successful farmer in Maricopa County for several decades.

== Early life ==
Hall was born on February 10, 1880, in Creston, Iowa. He was the brother of Dick Wick Hall, and came to Flagstaff, Arizona, in 1899, before moving to Phoenix the following year. In 1901 Hall, along with his brother Dick, moved to Wickenburg, where they began the Wickenburg News Herald, which became the largest newspaper in Wickenburg.

== Political career ==
In the late 1890s and 1900, Hall was a deputy in the office of the Secretary of Arizona Territory, Charles H. Akers. In December 1906 he was elected to serve as the justice of the peace in the Harrisburg precinct of Yuma County. He served in that capacity until April 1908. During the Arizona State Constitutional Convention, while Hall was not an official delegate, Hall was there and was responsible for writing many provisions of the document.

In 1914 Hall announced his candidacy for the State House of Representatives from Maricopa County, running on the Bull Moose Party ticket. However, he removed himself from the Bull Moose ticket in early October, and later was added to the Republican ticket, replacing Garrett P. Schuller, who retired. In the November general election, he came in 8th place, with 3140 votes, the top 6 vote getters who filled the 6 spots in the House, all Democrats, received between 5745 and 6870 votes. 1916 saw Hall running for the Republican ticket for the State Senate. In the primary there were three candidates, and Hall and H. B. Wilkinson, became the Republican nominees. Hall and Wilkinson defeated O. S. Stapley, an incumbent, and H. A. Davis, who had served in the first Arizona State Senate, in the November general election. During the special session of the legislature, Hall announced his resignation and enlisted in the U. S. Army.

In August 1920 Hall announced his candidacy for the Secretary of State of Arizona. He was unopposed in the Republican primary. He defeated Democrat Harry S. Ross in the general election, 31,328 to 29,658. Hall was the first Republican elected as secretary of state in Arizona. As secretary of state, Hall often had to step into the role of governor, whenever Governor Campbell was out of the state. Hall declared his intention to run for re-election in July 1922, and he faced off and defeated Wesley A. Hill in the Republican primary. However, he was defeated by James H. Kerby in the November general election. Despite his statement that he was forever finished with politics, in 1926 Hall announced his candidacy to once again run for the State Senate. The two Republicans ran unopposed in the primary, but were defeated by Dan P. Jones and Harlow Akers in the November general election.

In July 1930 Hall announced his candidacy for the state legislature once again. However, this time he was running for a seat in the House of Representatives, in Maricopa District 16. He defeated Mrs. Belle Butler in the Republican primary, but lost to J. F. Jennings in November's general election. In 1932 he ran for one of two seats on the State Tax Commission, going up against the two Democrat incumbents, Frank Luke and Thad M. Moore. The two incumbents easily won re-election, by a more than 2–1 margin. In 1932 he ran for one of two seats on the State Tax Commission, going up against the two Democrat incumbents, Frank Luke and Thad M. Moore. The two incumbents easily won re-election, by a more than 2–1 margin. In 1934 he was recruited to run for the Secretary of State position again. His opponent was incumbent James H. Kerby, who defeated him in the 1922 election. In the November rematch, Kerby once again came out on top, easily defeating Hall 59,113 to 33,170.

== Life outside politics ==
In 1905 Hall and his brother Dick, along with C. H. Pratt and Charles Caldwell, the latter two both of Pittsburgh, Pennsylvania, developed the townsite of Salome, Arizona. They drilled a well on the site, the first well drilled in northern Yuma County. The four men also incorporated the Arizona Contracting Company, which was formed to develop the townsite, as well as to engage in mineral exploration. In 1906 Hall was splitting his time between Wickenburg, where he had a home, and Salome, where he was appointed postmaster, with his brother Dick being vice-postmaster. Early in 1908, he became an agent for the fruit tree company, Stark Brothers, of Louisiana, Missouri. Later that year, he and his father, Thomas, had begun a fruit farm in Maricopa County, southwest of Phoenix, named the Blue Ribbon Ranch. The two continued to be the local representatives for the Stark Brothers. By 1910 they were exporting fruit to other states.

Hall served as the superintendent of the agricultural division of the Arizona State Fair in 1910 and 1911. He married Lillian M. Knall in Phoenix on February 28, 1912. In 1917, after the regular session of the legislature, Hall returned to Wickenburg to oversee the operations of the Glory Hall Mine, which he co-owned with his brother, Dick. In October of that year, he put his Blue Ribbon Ranch up for sale, and became the editor of the Wickenburg Miner.

When the United States entered World War I, he volunteered for the army and served with the American Expeditionary Forces in Europe for nine months. He resigned from the State Senate in June 1918 and enlisted in the 27th Engineers Battalion, which saw action at both the Battle of Saint-Mihiel and the Meuse–Argonne offensive. He attained the rank of sergeant. After the war, Hall returned to Phoenix in April 1919, where he met up with his brother, Dick. The two traveled to northern Texas where they engaged in the oil exploration business, along with their partner, Ernest Douglas, at first working in the interests of Aritex Oil Company. By May they were offering people the chance to invest in the burgeoning oil industry, through their mutual membership trust, the Texhall Oil Syndicate, which had interests in several oil properties in Texas. This venture was profitable, and short-lived, and the two brothers were headed home by June. On his return to Arizona he began working for the state highway department until June 1920, when he resigned to take over the cotton and fruit operations of the Elias and Pool ranch, of Arizona Securities Company.

After his defeat in the 1922 election for Secretary of State, Hall stated that he was officially retired from politics. He went into a mining venture with his brother Dick near Salome. In addition, he went back to farming with his father, this time focusing on pecans, although they still continued to grow fruit. His wife, Lillian, had been involved in selling real estate since 1925, and in 1927 Hall joined her and opened up his own real estate agency, Ernest R. Hall Realty Company. While running his real estate practice, he still was involved in farming, becoming one of the largest fruit and pecan producers in the Phoenix area. In 1953 he returned to Salome, and was their justice of the peace until just prior to his death. Hall died on March 29, 1959, in Prescott, where he had been living in the Arizona Pioneers' Home. He had been ill for several years.
