= Celora M. Stoddard =

American politician from Arizona

C. M. Stoddard

Member of the Arizona Senate from the Maricopa County district
- In office January 1921 – December 1922
- Preceded by: C. C. Green
- Succeeded by: H. C. Gilbert; J. C. Phillips

Personal details
- Born: August 13, 1886 Binghamton, New York
- Died: January 4, 1943 (aged 56) Phoenix, Arizona
- Party: Republican
- Spouse(s): Ada Vansant 1910-1917 (divorced); Betty Howard 1919-1914 (his death)
- Children: James (with Ada), Virginia (with Betty)
- Education: University of Southern California
- Profession: Politician, businessman

Celora Martin Stoddard was an American politician from Arizona. He served a single term in the Arizona State Senate during the 5th Arizona State Legislature, holding one of the two seats from Maricopa County. He ran unsuccessfully for the Republican nomination for governor in 1928. A World War I veteran, he helped establish the first American Legion post in Arizona in 1919, and became its first commander. He would later be selected the Legion's state commander, and also served a term as the national vice-commander of the organization. He was well known in the mining industry in Arizona.

== Biography ==
Stoddard was born on August 13, 1886, in Binghamton, New York, the son of Isaac and Mary Stoddard. Isaac served as the Secretary to the Territory of Arizona from 1901, when he was appointed by President McKinley, until 1904. After his term as secretary was over, he founded the Stoddard Incorporating Company in 1904. His maternal grandfather was Celora E. Martin, who he was named after, was a judge on the New York Supreme Court. His father, who had been splitting his time between Arizona and New York during the late 1880s and 1890s, moved the family permanently to Yavapai County in 1892, settling in a camp mining town, which was named Stoddard in his honor. The family moved to Phoenix on 1901, upon the elder Stoddard's appointment as state secretary.

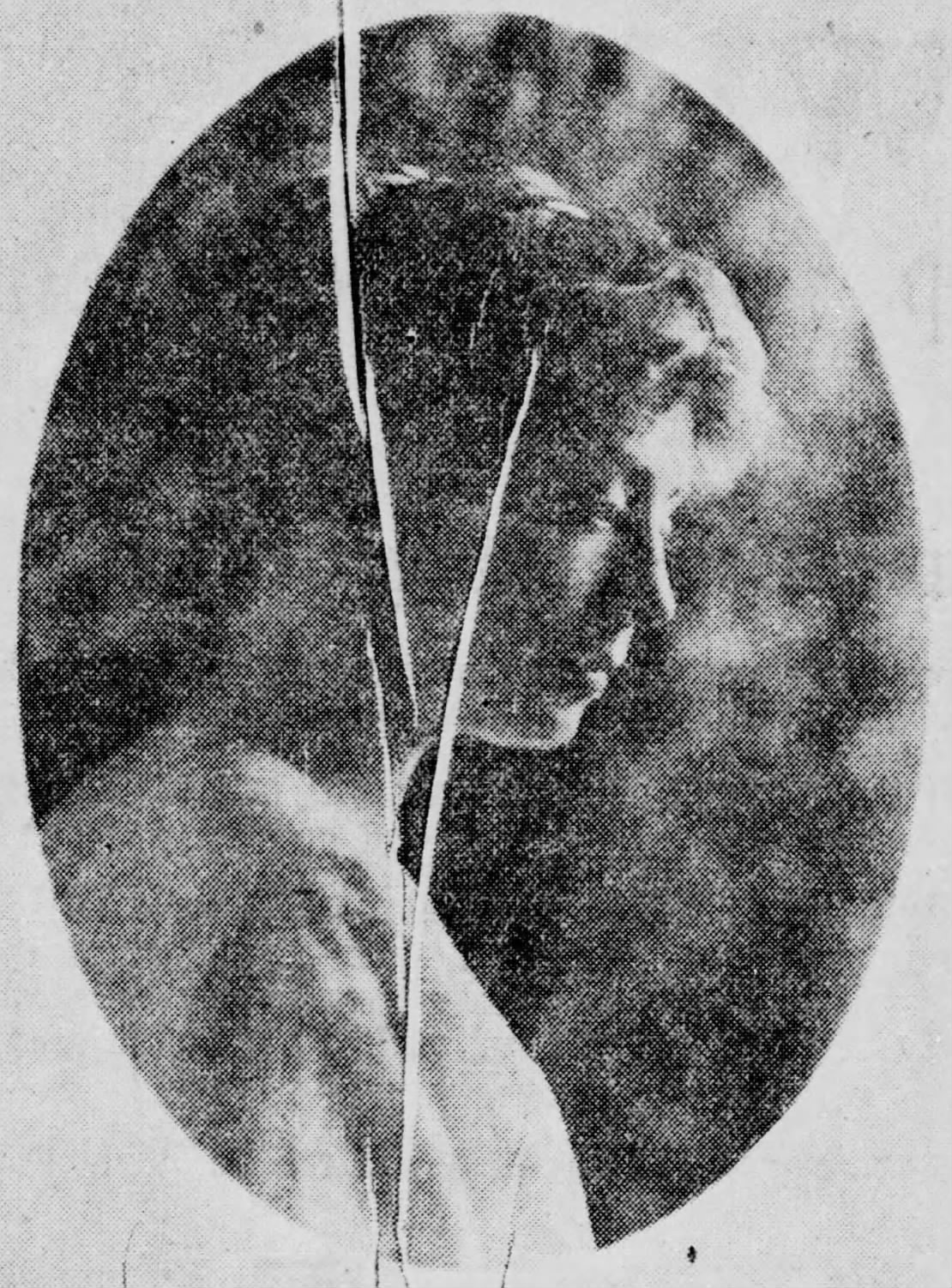
Ada Stoddard, ca. 1914

He married Ada Vansant of Philadelphia on March 1, 1910, in a private ceremony in Phoenix. Their son, James Vansant Stoddard, was born on June 19, 1911, in Prescott. By 1914 he was working for this father in the Stoddard Incorporating Company, where he was the secretary of the corporation. In 1914 he purchased The Rose Tree, a tea parlor and confectionary in Phoenix, refurbished it and turning it into a very successful establishment. He held on to the property for 18 months, before selling to the Donofrio Company. During the 1910s, Stoddard, along with his wife Ada, were amateur thespians.

In March 1916 Stoddard engineered a joint venture between the Stoddard Mines Co. and the Copper Queen Gold Mining Company to form the Stoddard Milling Company, of which he was the general manager, and erected a 150-ton-per-day flotation mill. The mill serviced the Binghamton Mine, owned by Stoddard Mines, and the Copper Queen Mine. In May 1917 Stoddard divorced Ada, citing "abandonment" as the grounds for the suit. The wife was given custody of their son, and given a monthly allowance, and the real estate assets, which included houses in Phoenix and Long Beach, California, were split up by the court.

In 1917 Stoddard was involved in attempting to establish a film studio in Arizona. After considering both Phoenix and Tucson, a site was selected in the Elysian Grove section of Tucson for the studio. He invested along with McClung Francisco and Webster Cullison, and put up a bond guaranteeing film production in Tucson. After the studio was constructed, no films were ever produced, and it was later dismantled, with Stoddard having to pay the $800 bond guaranteeing film production to the city. In 1917 Stoddard Mines had become the Arizona Binghamton Company. That year, Stoddard began a separate company, the Copper Mountain Mines Company, which began to re-open the old Stoddard Mine, which Isaac Stoddard had begun working on in 1881.

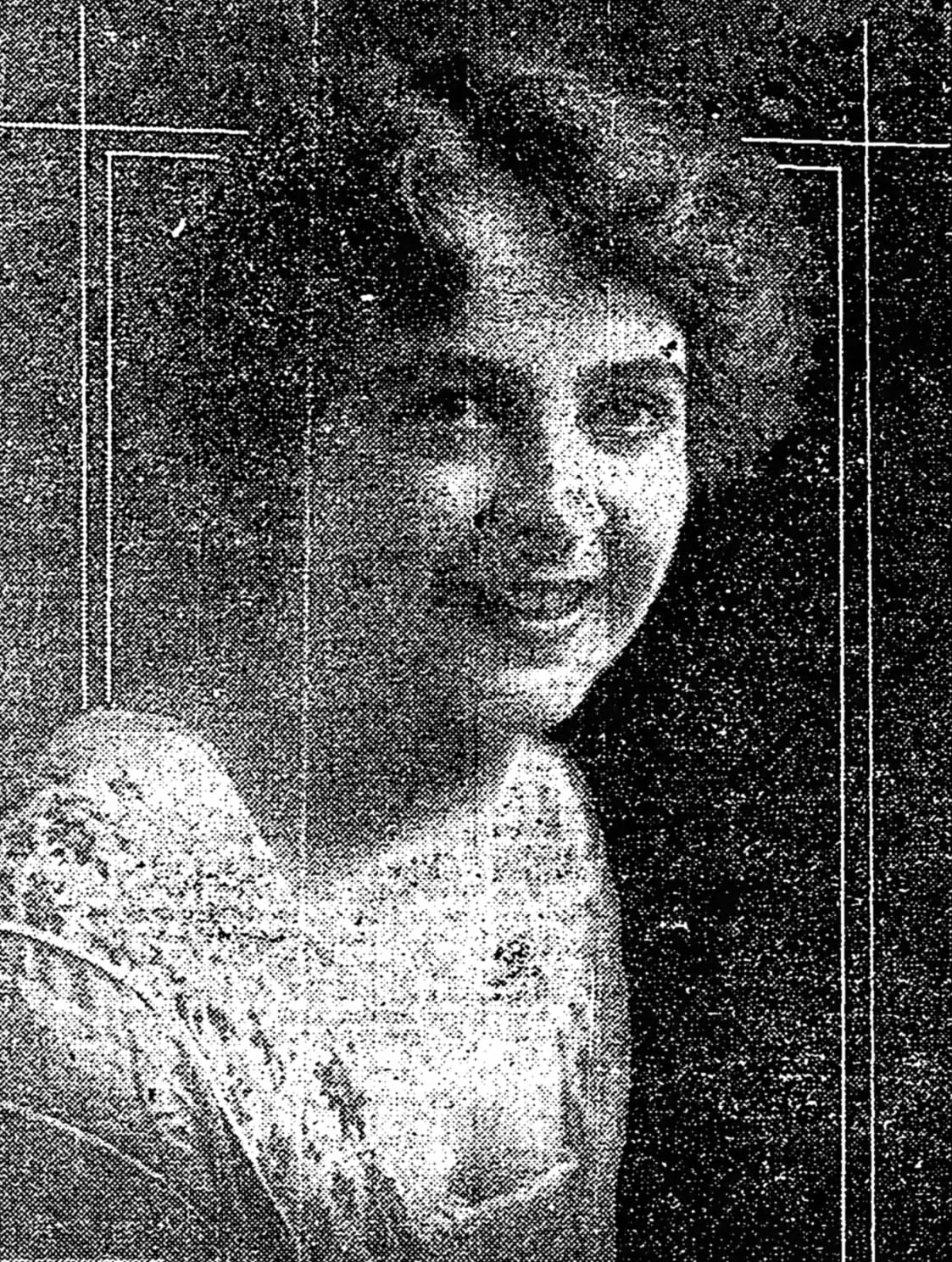
Betty Stoddard, ca. 1919

In 1918, Stoddard enlisted in the U. S. Army after the United States entry into World War I. He became a first-class gunner, and then was sent to officer's training, before being sent overseas to fight in France. He was discharged in December that year. In early 1919, after his discharge from the army, Stoddard remarried, this time to Betty Howard of Pasadena, California. The couple had a daughter, Virginia. Stoddard was very active in the American Legion. In 1919 he was elected the commander of the Frank Luke Post Number 1 in Phoenix. In 1922 he was elected the state commander for Arizona. And in 1923 he was elected vice-commander of the national American Legion.

In July 1920, Stoddard announced his intention to run on the Republican ticket for one of the two Arizona State Senate seats from Maricopa County. He and H. B. Wilkinson, an incumbent, ran unopposed in the Republican primary. Both he and Wilkinson won in the November general election. Stoddard and Wilkinson were under consideration for the presidency of the Senate when the new legislature convened in January 1921, with Wilkinson eventually being elected. He did not run for re-election in 1922. In 1921, with two partners, he began a brick-facing company, the Arizona Shope Concrete Brick Company. In June 1928 he was urged to run for the Republican nomination for Governor, and he officially announced his intention to run the following month. He was one of three Republicans running in the primary, the other two being John H. Udall and John C. Phillips. Stoddard finished third in the primary, with Phillips winning the Republican nomination. In 1938, the Republicans failed to have any candidates step forward and seek the nomination for State Senator from Maricopa County. The county committee asked that voters write in their choices. Stoddard won the write-in campaign, but stated that he would not accept the nomination.

Stoddard died on January 4, 1943, at his home in Phoenix from a heart ailment, from which he had been suffering since 1935.
