= C. B. Wood =

Arizona politician

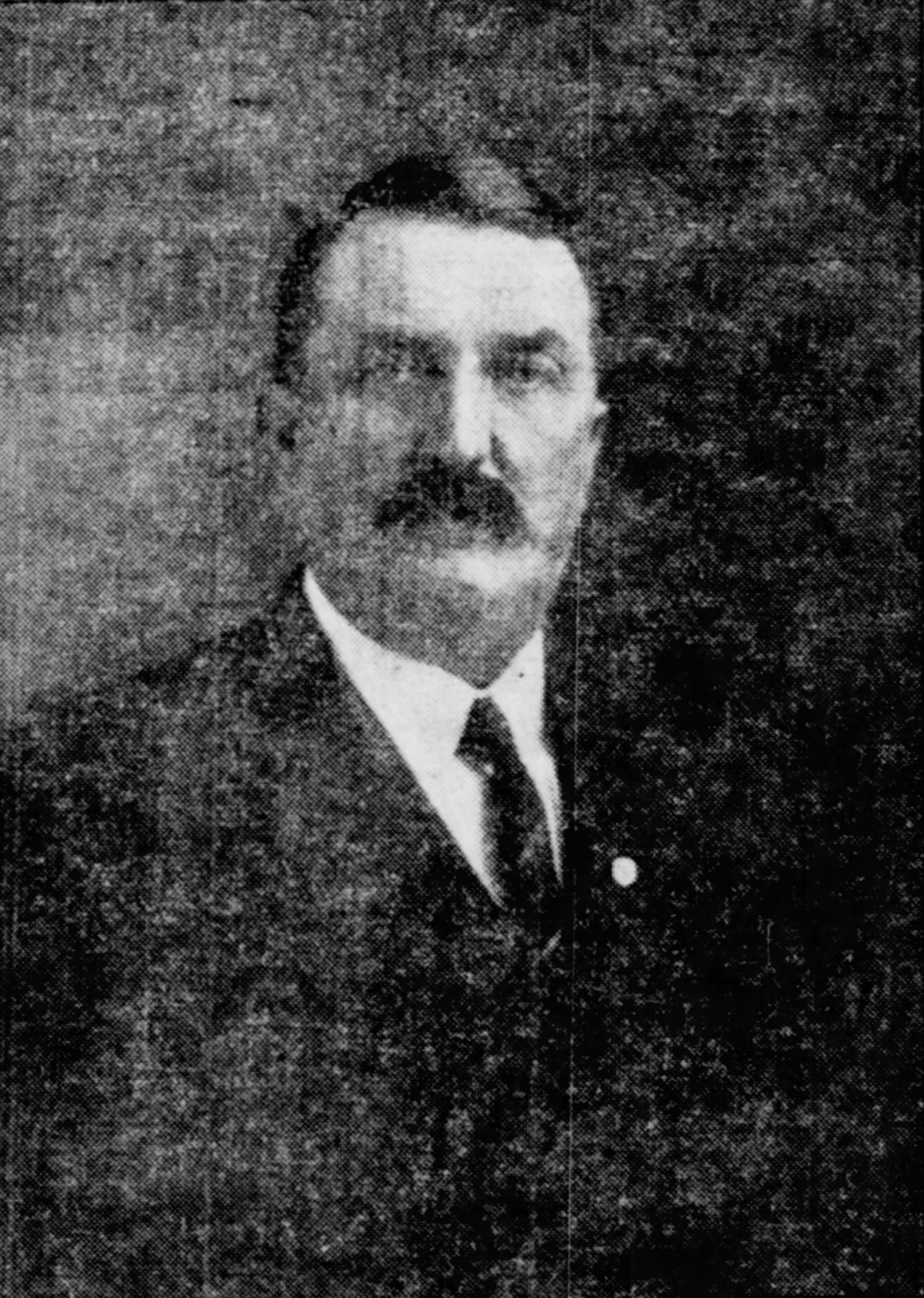
- Wood, ca. 1912

Member of the Arizona Senate from the Maricopa County district
- In office March 1912 – January 1915
- Preceded by: First Senator from Maricopa County
- Succeeded by: O. S. Stapley; Sam F. Webb

Personal details
- Born: October 10, 1867 Calwood, MO
- Died: October 31, 1915 (aged 48) Phoenix, AZ
- Party: Democratic
- Profession: Politician

C. B. Wood (Chalmers Barbour Wood) was an Arizona politician who served in the 1st Arizona State Legislature. He was also heavily involved in the Arizona State Fair, was a Maricopa County under-sheriff, had a real estate company, and was postmaster of Phoenix.

== Life ==
Originally from Missouri, Wood was in real estate, being a partner of the firm Wood-O'Neill Real Estate Company (incorporated in 1903). He also served as under-sheriff of Maricopa County.

Wood was appointed secretary of the State Fair, after which it was determined that his appointment meant he had to resign from the state legislature. The Arizona Constitution prohibited any person who held a public office under either federal or state government to be a member of the state legislature. However, when the legislature re-convened in February 1913, Wood was still in the state senate. Apparently it had been decided that this rule did not apply to state or federal positions for which the state legislature had no say in setting the salary. Wood resigned from the State Fair committee in 1914, and its success during his two year tenure was credited largely to him.

In October 1915, Wood was put under investigation by federal investigators for "conduct unbecoming a gentleman toward a lady". Shortly after, on October 31, 1915, Wood died in a fire at his home on Black Canyon Pike. He had been renting the home, but he kept an office there. As was usual on Sunday evenings, he and his wife stopped by so that Wood could work in his office. While his wife was visiting neighbors, it became dark and Wood lit an oil lamp. The lamp exploded, causing a fire. Wood's warning shouts enabled the tenant and his disabled son to escape, but Wood was overcome by fumes, had a heart attack, and died in the fire.

== Political career ==
In 1911, Wood declared his candidacy for one of two seats in Maricopa County in the state senate. He was one of four Democrats to run in the primary. He received the most number of votes in the Democrat primary in October, getting 1,201 to the runner-up, H. A. Davis', 961. He and Davis both won in the general election in December. Wood served on numerous committees in the senate: Rules; Finance; Judiciary; Appropriate; Banking and Insurance; Public Service Corporations; Suffrage and Elections; Education and Public Institutions; and Counties and County Affairs.

He sponsored a bill signed into law which created a state home for the destitute, homeless, depraved women and abandoned children, and established a funding appropriation for it. During the legislative term, he broke ranks with Davis, feeling that there should be a new election in November 1912. He also believed the members of the first legislature should serve only a single year, rather than three. Davis filed suit, and eventually the state supreme court ruled in Davis' favor, and the members of the first legislature served for three years. Wood was considered a skilled speaker and the best parliamentarian in either house of the legislature.

In the second session of the legislature, Wood authored a bill which created a state reclamation program. The bill included the creation of a reclamation commission, a reclamation fund, and the issuance of $20,000,000 in bonds to fund the project. In 1913 and early 1914 there was talk of Wood running for state treasurer in the 1914 election; however, in August 1914, Wood was appointed as the U.S. Postmaster for Phoenix by Woodrow Wilson, at the recommendation of Congressman Hayden.
