= Isaac T. Stoddard =

American politician (1851–1914)

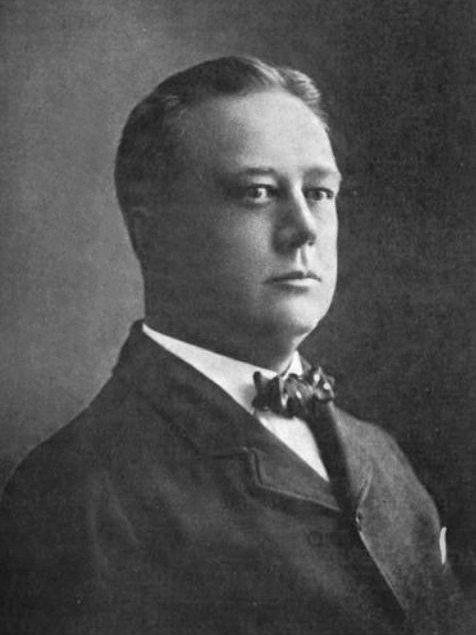

12th Secretary of Arizona Territory
- In office June 21, 1901 – March 18, 1904
- Nominated by: William McKinley
- Governor: Alexander Oswald Brodie
- Preceded by: Charles H. Akers
- Succeeded by: William Francis Nichols

Personal details
- Born: January 19, 1851 Triangle, New York
- Died: November 10, 1914 (aged 63) Phoenix, Arizona
- Party: Republican
- Spouse: Mary Martin (m. 1879)

Isaac Taft Stoddard (January 19, 1851 – November 10, 1914) was an American businessman. Born in the State of New York, he started in the insurance industry there and in Connecticut before turning his attention to copper mining in the Arizona Territory. He owned either personally or with investors several mines in Yavapai County, built the first smelter in that part of the state, and secured the investment of over $1,000,000 in the mines to increase production. Another business venture was assisting out-of-territory corporations in incorporating in the territory. He served as the twelfth Secretary of the Arizona Territory from 1902 to 1904, but was forced to resign amid criticism over conflict between this business and his position as Secretary. He continued in mining and incorporating, and later became president of a telephone and telegraph company.

== Background ==
Stoddard was born in Triangle, New York to Roswell W. and Angelina (Taft) Stoddard on January 19, 1851. His father was a merchant; his mother was a cousin of President William Taft He was educated in public schools and at the academy in Whitney Point, New York. Stoddard began reading law at the age of 12. For a short time, he worked informally as an attorney practicing in local New York courts. In 1874 at age 18, he then became a special agent for the Hartford Accident Company dealing with fire and accident insurance. and moved from New York to Hartford, Connecticut. Shortly after joining the firm he was promoted to general superintendent and within three years he was the head of the legal department.

During an 1878 summer vacation, Stoddard was walking on a beach in Block Island, about 13 miles (21 km) off the Rhode Island coast, when he noticed a boy in a small boat drop his oars and begin drifting out to sea. He saved the boy, who could not swim, by swimming out to the boat. The boy, John Maynard Harlan, was the son of John Marshall Harlan, an associate justice of the U.S. Supreme Court. Stoddard met John Maynard Harlan 35 years later in Arizona and then learned that he was the boy he saved. John Maynard Harlan's son, John Marshall Harlan II, also became a Supreme Court justice.

== Arizona mining ==
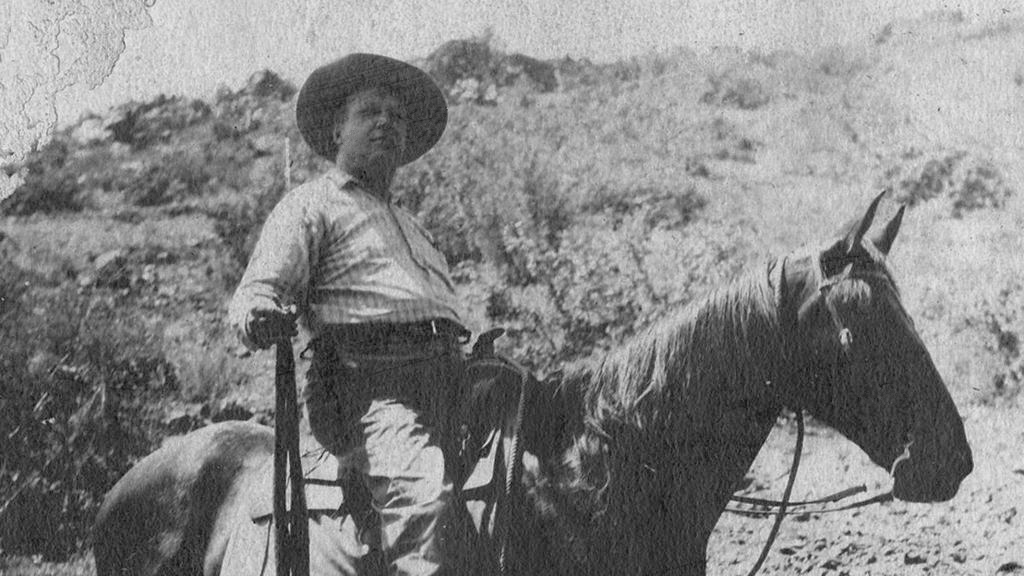
Stoddard, circa 1900, in Stoddard, Arizona

Around 1879, Stoddard began to develop a series of business interests in Arizona Territory. These interests would grow to include two groups of patented mines and the first copper smelter in Central or Northern Arizona. One operation was the Copper Mountain Mine, whose claim he owned along with his uncle, M. S. Taft. Stoddard organized the Copper Mountain Mining Co. in 1882 to work the mine, primarily with investors from Hartford. Taft oversaw the day-to-day operations in Arizona, until he resigned in 1883, leaving Stoddard in charge. The mine was located near the Agua Fria River, which provided a sufficient water supply for operating the mine and smelter. Another mine was operated by the Stoddard Copper Company.

Stoddard resigned from the insurance firm in 1884 and lived seasonally in both Arizona and New York City. In 1892 he moved permanently to the company town of Stoddard, Arizona Territory. (Note: Another source says he did not become a permanent resident until 1901.)

The smelter, built in 1882 and the first in Yavapai County, was initially built with a 30-ton water jacket and was later enlarged to 50 tons. Stoddard financed development of the mining operations by securing investments from people in his native New York, including U.S. Senator Thomas C. Platt. The smelter was built based on surface deposits that were not profitable and saw little use in its first twenty years. $350,000 was spent developing the Copper Mountain Mine for mining of copper ore extracted through excavation and tunneling. In 1901, the mine was reported to be owned by the Stoddard Copper Mining Company, of which Stoddard was the majority owner. Stoddard also personally owed the nearby Binghamton mines, 3 miles (4.8 km) away, named after the city of Binghamton, New York, which is approximately 20 miles (32 km) from where he was born. Stoddard was reported to have spent almost $1,000,000 on developing mines in the region in the prior two decades, mostly from East Coast investors.

In 1906, the Stoddard Copper Company was dissolved and replaced with the Stoddard Mines Company. Stoddard was vice president and his son Celora Martin Stoddard was secretary and treasurer, while the president was William H. Reynolds. Reynolds, from Brooklyn, New York, represented Brooklyn in the New York State Senate from 1894 to 1895 and was a real estate investor in New York before becoming Stoddard's partner in the Arizona mining ventures.

In 1908, Stoddard secured another $300,000 for further development of the Binghamton mine, allowing the main mine shaft to be extended to a depth of 700 feet (210 m).

After Stoddard's death, the company was again reorganized into the Copper Mountain Mines Company, with Celora Stoddard as president and Reynolds as vice president.

== Arizona Territorial Secretary ==
When William McKinley became President of the United States in 1897, U.S. Senator Henry Cabot Lodge and several Congressmen from New York recommended Stoddard as a nonpolitical candidate to replace Governor Benjamin Joseph Franklin. McKinley nominated Stoddard to become territorial secretary on June 5, 1901, and Stoddard subsequently moved to Phoenix in 1902.

The primary duties of the secretary of the territory were to attend legislative sessions to record laws and resolutions, to record acts of the governor, to seal documents signed by the governor, to record articles of incorporation, to certify elections, to provide copies to the public of official documents, to have printed and published the laws of each legislative session, to store and secure the original legislative acts and resolutions, and other records, deeds, maps, etc., to distribute the published statutes as required, and to perform the duties of the governor when the governor was out of the territory or otherwise incapable.

When Stoddard took office, the territorial secretary was the most financially lucrative position in the territorial government. This is because territorial law allowed the secretary to retain incorporation fees. It is estimated that Stoddard was receiving $40,000 per year (about $1,550,000 per year in present-day terms) in fees, and he had built a side business that assisted foreign businesses to incorporate under Arizona law. His earnings were harshly criticized. An editorial at the time stated:

Issac T. Stoddard, by virtue of being territorial secretary has made, during the first seven months in office, between $25,000 and $30,000. This money belongs to the territory and we see no reason why the territory or the citizens of it should pay a man of his ordinary ability at the rate of $50,000 or $60,000 a year for warming a leather cushioned chair and gracing the finely furnished offices provided by the people of the territory. The legislature should either pass a law providing that the fees of this office should go to the territory or increase the salaries of the Governor, Treasurer, and Auditor to proportionate amounts. The Secretary now receives salaries from the United States and the territory which many better qualified men than Stoddard would be glad to receive for the same work and there is no reason why the $50,000 or $60,000 should not go into the territorial treasury to pay territorial taxes.

The 22nd Arizona Territorial Legislature changed the law in 1903, resulting in the fees going into the territorial treasury.

In June 1903, Governor Alexander Oswald Brodie was out of the Territory, making Stoddard the acting territory governor. At that time, 3,500 mostly "foreign" (Mexican and Italian) miners in the towns of Clifton, Morenci, and Metcalf went on strike in a wage dispute related to the "eight-hour law". Mine "bosses" appealed to Stoddard for help. Stoddard quickly ordered the Arizona Rangers to assist the local Graham County sheriff in maintaining order. The contingent of fifteen Rangers and fifty deputies requested additional support, and Stoddard subsequently sent six companies of the National Guard (then known as the Arizona Territorial Militia). He also prevailed on President Theodore Roosevelt, who agreed to send several units of United States Cavalry.

=== Resignation ===
After the law was changed, Stoddard was alleged to have continued to retain the fees, failed to provide accounting to an oversight committee, and burned records to prevent inspection. Charges were filed against Stoddard for "promoting the incorporation of companies in Arizona". Although not illegal, retaining the incorporation fees after the change in law was. In October 1903, he traveled to Washington, D.C. to defend himself to Secretary of the Interior Ethan Hitchcock, claiming the charges were made by "irresponsible persons".

After intense criticism, he eventually tendered his resignation. Thomas C. Platt, the powerful Senator of New York State, where Stoddard's father-in-law, Celora E. Martin, was a member of the state's highest court, attempted to convince President Roosevelt to retain Stoddard, but Roosevelt refused and accepted the resignation effective April 1, 1904.

== Later life ==
Upon leaving public office, Stoddard formed the Stoddard Incorporating Company and remained as its president until his death. The company became the largest such venture in Arizona and processed up to two hundred incorporations monthly.

In 1911, Stoddard was elected president and general manager of the Overland Telephone Co headquartered in Phoenix. He was president for two years. When the company was formed in 1908, the Stoddard Incorporating Company filed the paperwork. Under Stoddard, the company grew and prospered. Shortly after he left, Overland was bought by Mountain States Telephone and Telegraph Company, part of the Bell System.

Stoddard died on November 10, 1914, from apoplexy. He was buried in the Floral Park Cemetery in Johnson City, New York.

Stoddard was the namesake of the town of Stoddard, located about 17 miles (27 km) southeast of Prescott, which served as a supply center for the Aqua Fria mining district.

== Personal ==
Socially, Stoddard was a member of the Sons of the American Revolution and the Benevolent and Protective Order of Elks. He married Mary Martin, daughter of Judge Celora E. Martin, on June 12, 1879. The union produced two children, a daughter Florence and a son Celora Martin Stoddard. Florence died in 1903 at the age of 22 at the home of Judge Martin, her grandfather. Celora was a member of the Arizona State Senate from 1921 to 1923, and ran in the Republican primary for Governor of Arizona in September 1928, but lost to John C. Phillips, who later won the election.

== Notes ==
Political offices
Preceded by Charles H. Akers	Secretary of the Territory of Arizona; 1901–1904	Succeeded by William Francis Nichols
