= William Francis Nichols =

American politician, Arizona (1852–1917)

William F. Nichols
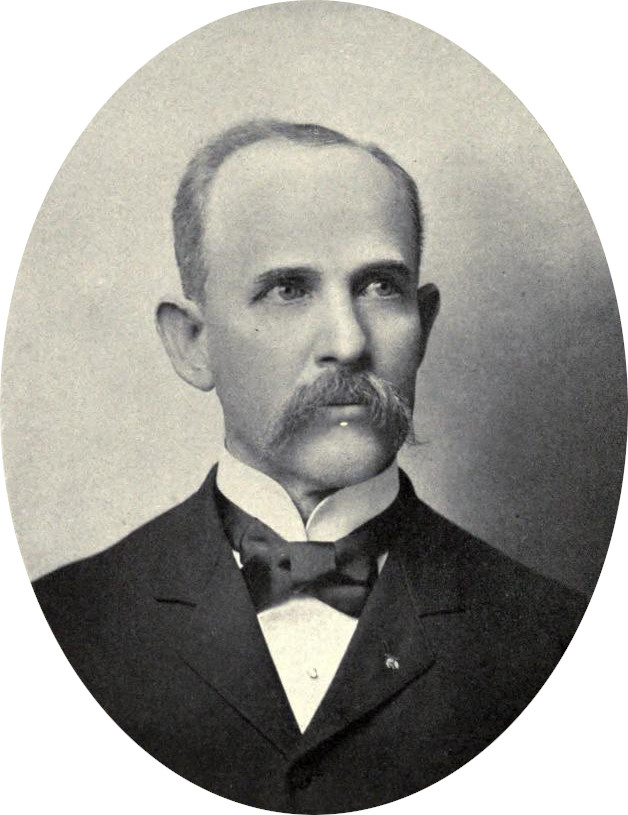

13th Secretary of Arizona Territory
- In office April 7, 1904 – April 1, 1908
- Nominated by: Theodore Roosevelt
- Preceded by: Isaac T. Stoddard
- Succeeded by: John H. Page

Personal details
- Born: October 8, 1852 Sterling, Massachusetts
- Died: November 15, 1917 (aged 65) Los Angeles, California
- Party: Republican
- Spouse: Nora Minerva (Seeley) Butterfield (m. 1898–1911)

William Francis Nichols (October 8, 1852 – November 15, 1917) was an American businessman and politician. A long serving justice of the peace, he was elected to the Arizona Territorial Legislature and appointed to a four-year term as Secretary of Arizona Territory.

== Biography ==
Nichols was born to William Nathaniel and Emily Louise (Haywood) Nichols on October 8, 1852 in Sterling, Massachusetts. The family moved to Michigan Bar, California in 1855. From there, they went to Sacramento before settling in Oakland. Nichols was educated in Oakland's public schools. Upon completing his formal education, Nichols went to work for his father and brother in the family's woodenware business.

After moving to Arizona Territory in 1880, Nichols lived in Tombstone and Charleston for about a year before settling in Willcox. There he went to work for the L. W. Blinn Lumber Company. Initially living in the company's Willcox office, Nichols purchased the company in 1888. In addition to lumber, Nichols developed interests in real estate and cattle ranching. Socially, Nichols was a Mason who achieved the 32nd degree. He was also a member of the Ancient Order of United Workmen. Nichols married Nora Minerva (Seeley) Butterfield on July 18, 1898.

Becoming active in county level Republican politics shortly after his arrival in Arizona, Nichols became a justice of the peace by 1883. He held this position for eighteen years.He also served as a United States Courts commissioner for several years. Nichols was elected to represent Cochise County in the 13th Arizona Territorial Legislature. In April 1898, he became a member of the Live Stock Sanitary Board. Governor N. O. Murphy appointed Nichols Territorial Auditor in October 1901 and he took the oath of office on November 1. Governor Alexander Oswald Brodie nominated him for a second term as auditor on January 28, 1903.

In early 1904, Governor Brodie recommended Nichols for the position of Territorial Secretary. President Theodore Roosevelt made the nomination on March 30, 1904. As secretary, Nichols became a leader in the fight against Arizona and New Mexico receiving joint statehood. Beyond that he is credited for the satisfactory performance of his duties and was widely respected. Unlike most of Arizona's secretaries, Nichols did not seek advancement to the position of governor. When Governor Brodie recommended Nichols to become his successor in 1908, Nichols declined to take the position. Nichols' given reason was that the territory would soon face a political battle over how mines were taxed and he was poorly suited to lead the fight. He also declined a second term as secretary and instead left office at the end of his term on April 1, 1908.

Nichols and his wife moved to Los Angeles, California shortly after he left office. There she died on May 13, 1911. In 1914, Nichols' house burned down and he moved into his club instead of rebuilding. Nichols died in Los Angeles on November 15, 1917. He was cremated and his remains interred at Los Angeles' Rosedale Cemetery.
