= C. C. Green =

American politician from Arizona

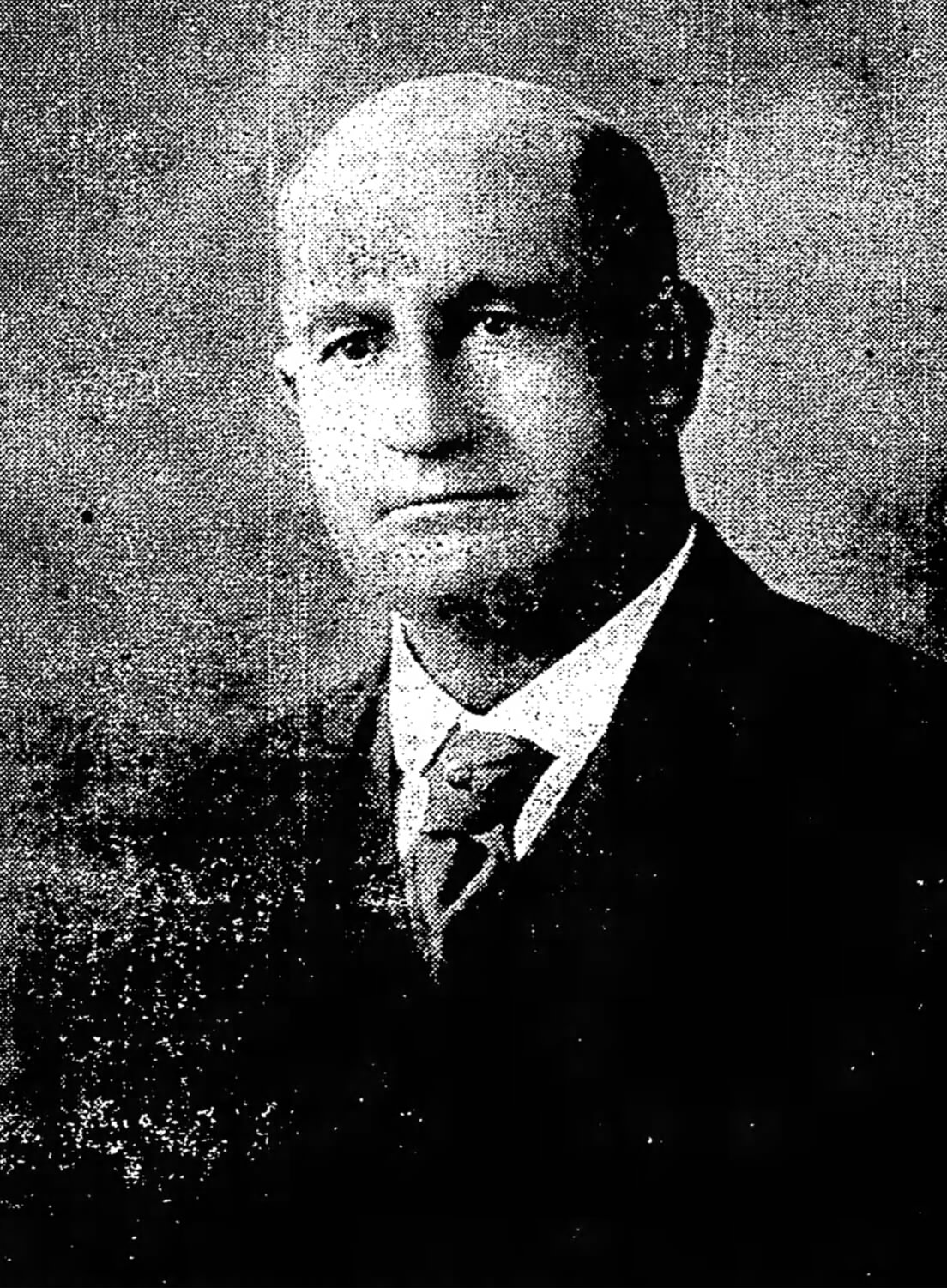
- Green, ca. 1918

Arizona House of Representatives
- In office January 1917 – December 1918
- Constituency: Maricopa County

Member of the Arizona Senate from the Maricopa County district
- In office January 1919 – December 1920
- Preceded by: Ernest Hall
- Succeeded by: C. M. Stoddard

Personal details
- Party: Republican
- Profession: Politician

Charles C. Green was an American rancher and politician from Arizona. He served a single term in the Arizona House of Representatives during the 3rd Arizona State Legislature, followed by a single term in the Arizona State Senate during the 4th Arizona State Legislature.

== Biography ==
Green was born in 1868. In 1885 Green was involved in the hotel business in Cleveland, Ohio. He moved to Arizona in October 1886. Green married Nannie Barkley on October 12, 1892. The couple had five children, four daughters, Julia, Frances, Alleen, Helen, and one son, C. Baird. In 1895 Green purchased the Holstein Dairy Farm. In the early 1900s Green owned a ranch outside of Phoenix, Arizona, in the Cartwright area. In 1910, he and two partners opened up the Glendale Hay & Gray Company.

In 1911, Green ran for one of the seats on the Maricopa County Board of Supervisors. In 1915 Green was one of the charter members of the United Produce Growers' Association of Phoenix. Green helped form and served as the first president of the Maricopa Farm Improvement Association, also known as the Farmers' Union.

In 1916 he was selected to run on the Republican ticket for the Arizona House of Representatives, and was elected in November. In 1918, Green ran for the State Senate, along with the incumbent, fellow Republican H. B. Wilkinson. The pair won by a large majority in the November election. He was appointed to the Maricopa County Highway Commissioner in 1919, but forced to resign from it in 1920 due to state constitutional requirements, since he was simultaneously serving in the State Legislature. He did not run for re-election in 1920.

In 1922, Green moved his family from Glendale to Phoenix. This was followed by a move to Mesa in 1923. In 1928, Green once again ran for the State House of Representatives. While unopposed in the Republican primary, he lost in the general election to C. M. Brimhall. In 1929, Green was appointed by the Mesa City Council to the position of city farmer. The city's farm consisted of approximately 1400 acres. He remained in that position until July 1931, when he resigned. Green died in Phoenix on December 1, 1944.
