= Samuel F. Webb =

American politician in Arizona

Sam F. Webb
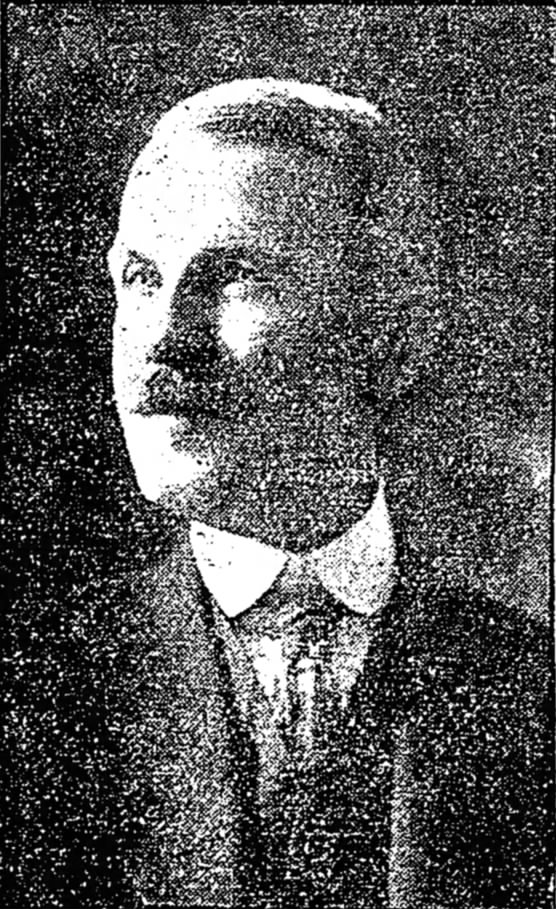
- Webb, ca. 1916

Member of the Arizona Senate from the Maricopa County district
- In office January 1915 – January 1917
- Preceded by: H. A. Davis; C. B. Wood
- Succeeded by: Ernest Hall; H. B. Wilkinson

Personal details
- Party: Democratic
- Profession: Politician

Sam F. Webb was a politician from Arizona who served in the Arizona legislature for several terms, both when it was a territory and after it became a state. He served in the state house of representatives during the 12th, 14th, and 25th Arizona Territorial Legislatures, and in the upper house of the legislature, called the council, during the 15th Arizona Territorial Legislature. During the 14th and 25th legislatures he served as Speaker. He also served in the Arizona State Senate during the 2nd Arizona State Legislature. He held several other governmental positions over the years, including customs inspector for Arizona, Maricopa County treasurer, as well as serving in both the Maricopa County's assessor's and recorder's offices, and a short stint as a deputy U.S. Marshall. He also operated several successful mining operations in both Arizona and Sonora, Mexico, was both a rancher and farmer, and was the editor of several papers in Tucson and Phoenix.

== Personal life ==
Webb was born in Grass Valley, California on October 13, 1853. He married his wife, Mary Jane, in San Diego in 1875, before moving to Arizona in either 1876 or 1877, where he became a farmer and cattle rancher in Maricopa County. The couple had twelve children, nine boys and three girls. Webb's young son, Grover Adlai, died at the age of 18 months in March 1894 due to bronchitis. In 1895 another son of Webb's, Albert, died of diphtheria at the age of 6. His father, George Webb, committed suicide in 1896, by shooting himself in the head. Another child of the Webb's, a 10-month old infant, died suddenly at their home in Phoenix on Central Avenue in November 1898.

In 1889, he purchased the Tasker Ranch from Dr. L. H. Goodrich, comprising 160 acres northwest of Phoenix for $16,000. In early 1898 he briefly worked as a deputy U. S. Marshall, and participated in the posse which tracked down the outlaw known as "Black Jack".

In 1889 he purchased the Phoenix Gazette. In May 1893 Webb sold his interests in the Gazette. In April 1898, Webb took a position at The Phoenix Gazette, the paper he used to own. He and his family left Nogales and returned to live in Phoenix. In October of that year, Webb and his partner, John O. Dunbar, purchased a 50 percent interest in the paper, making Dunbar the editor and Webb the business manager. In 1899, Myron H. McCord, former territorial governor of Arizona, purchased a controlling interest in the paper, and ousted Webb and Dunbar. In 1902, Webb purchased The Arizona Democrat, a small bi-weekly paper in Phoenix, promising to make it into a daily morning paper. At the same time, Webb also attempted to regain control of The Phoenix Gazette. Taken over several years earlier by Myron H. McCord. Webb exercised an option to invest $7,555 into the paper, and after McCord left Phoenix to go to Washington D.C., Webb called meetings of the board of directors of the paper and ousted McCord as managing editor, much like McCord had ousted him three years earlier. The paper, which had been slanted towards Democrats, had shifted to slant to the Republicans under McCord. With a return to Webb, a staunch Democrat, it was expected that the paper would return to a Democrat's slant. After several contentious months, Webb lost control of the Gazette, when the Creighton Brothers purchased Webb's in the paper in April 1902. In February 1903, Webb also departed from the Phoenix Democrat.

In 1892, he became the primary investor in a mine, the "Relief Mine", north of Phoenix, between New River and Agua Fria, which became quite lucrative. He sold the Relief Mine to George Hamlin in 1901 for $10,000. In May 1896, Webb became the owner of the "Favorite Mine", about 60 miles south of Nogales in Sonora, Mexico. The mine was very lucrative. Tragedy struck at the mine in June 1897 when Webb's 19-year-old son, George W., was killed in a mining accident. Around noon on June 28 around noon, miners had loaded five holes in preparation for blasting, and George had begun to light the fuses to set them off in order, when one blasts went off prematurely, causing George to be struck in the face and chest with rock shrapnel. He did not die immediately, but lingered on for much of the remainder of the day, finally dying around 9:30 that night. George's brother, Morgan, rode to Nogales to inform their parents of the accident, and the elder Webb and his wife rode down to the mine, but were met on the way with the news of their son's death. They brought the young man's body back to Nogales, where he was buried. Webb sold the mine for a significant amount the following month.

After a long illness, Webb died unexpectedly in his home in Phoenix on November 7, 1920.

== Political career ==
In 1893, Webb was appointed as the Customs Collector of Arizona by President Grover Cleveland. His appointment was confirmed unanimously in the U.S. Senate by a 54–0 margin, in September. His appointment caused him to move, along with his family down to Nogales, although he retained his residence in Phoenix. With the departure of Grover Cleveland from office in March 1897 and the beginning of a Republican administration in Washington D.C., Webb tendered his resignation as customs collector, which President McKinley accepted.

Webb served in the Arizona Territory's 12th territorial legislature. He did not run for the 13th legislature in 1884, but in 1886 he ran once again for the House of Representatives in the 14th legislature. He won, and was selected as Speaker of the House. In 1888, Webb ran for the territorial legislature again, this time for the upper house, called the council. He easily won in the general election, garnering over 1200 more votes than his opponent. He decided not to run for re-election in 1890, However, he did run for sheriff of Maricopa County, winning the Democrat nomination in a field of four. He narrowly lost in the general election of November to Republican J. B. Montgomery.

In 1904 he was nominated by the Democrats to run for the state house of representatives for one of the seats from Maricopa County. The Republicans, however, swept the elections in Maricopa. In 1908 Webb was once again nominated by the Democrats as their choice for one of the lower house seats in the state legislature from Maricopa County. Webb, along with his two Democrat colleagues, Frank DeSouza and J. W. Woolf, along with Republican J. C. Reed, won the four house seats from Maricopa in November's general election. Very shortly after the general election, the fight for the speakership of the house began, with Webb squaring off against Fred Sutter. By January 1909 two more members of the House, W. W. Pace and J. W. Woolf, announced their intention to run for the speakership. However, shortly before the legislature convened, both Pace and Woolf withdrew from the race. On the first ballot, the vote was split evenly between Webb and Sutter, each man receiving 8 votes. However, the 17th Democrat in the house, Joseph Patterson of Navajo County, arrived late and cast the deciding vote for Webb. On the second ballot Webb was elected unanimously.

In 1911, he was one of several prominent Democrats who protested the proposed Constitution of Arizona.

In August 1914, Webb announced his intention to run for the Maricopa seat in the state senate. Both of the incumbents were Democrats, C. B. Wood and H. A. Davis, but Wood was not running for re-election, due to his appointment by Woodrow Wilson to be the U. S. Postmaster for Phoenix. Davis did run, and along with Webb, there were three other Democrats seeking the 2 nominations: Harry Johnson, J. A. R. Irvine, and O. S. Stapley. Stapley garnered the most number of votes in the Democrat's primary, while Webb eked out a victory over the incumbent, Davis. Webb and Stapley were elected in the November general election. In 1916, he did not run for re-election to the state senate, instead he ran for, and won the position of Maricopa County Treasurer.
