= O. S. Stapley =

American politician in Arizona

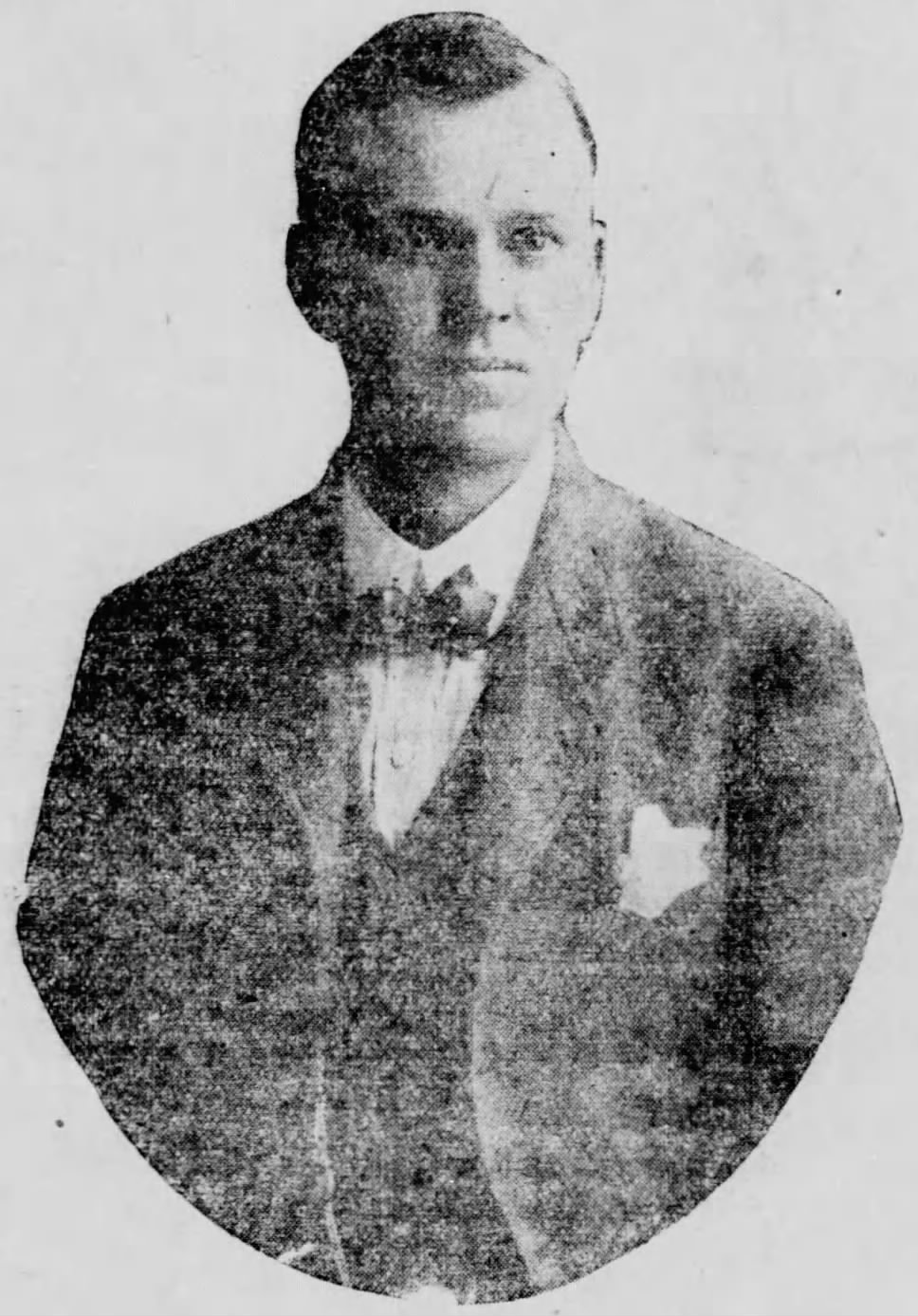
- Stapley in 1914

Member of the Arizona Senate from the Maricopa County district
- In office January 1915 – January 1917
- Preceded by: H. A. Davis; C. B. Wood
- Succeeded by: Ernest Hall; H. B. Wilkinson

Personal details
- Born: April 28, 1872 Tokerville, Utah
- Died: April 15, 1942 (aged 69) Mesa, Arizona
- Party: Democratic
- Spouse: Polly Hunsaker
- Children: Orley Glen, Delbert, Lorel, Thyrle, Wayne, Erwin, LaRue, Zola, and Cleo
- Profession: Politician

Orley S. Stapley (April 28, 1872 – April 15, 1942) was a politician from Arizona who served in the Arizona state senate during the 2nd Arizona State Legislature. He began what would become the largest mercantile business in Arizona, and he was the largest dealer of International Harvester products in the United States.

== Personal life ==
Stapley was born on April 28, 1872, in Tokerville, Utah. His family moved to Mesa, Arizona in 1882. In his early years he worked as both a farmer and a stagecoach driver. Stapley married Polly Hunsaker of Mesa in 1894. The couple had nine children: six boys (Orley Glen, Delbert, Lorel, Thyrle, Wayne, and Erwin) and three girls (LaRue, Zola, and Cleo).

He played baseball for the Mesa City team, and was known for his hunting skills. He was also the manager of the Mesa Opera House. When the Mesa Building & Loan opened in 1909, Stapley was its president. Stapley also had extensive real estate holdings throughout Arizona. One of those holdings, known as Stapley Acres, became part of the Temple Historic District. In 1942 Stapley donated the property located at LeSueur Street and East Fourth Avenue for the new church for the Fifth Ward of the LDS church in Mesa. Upon his death several months later, his was the second funeral service held in the church.

While visiting Chicago, Illinois in 1919, as a pedestrian, Stapley was struck by two vehicles while crossing the street. He stepped back to avoid one car, getting struck by another car coming the opposite direction and trapped between the two. He walked away from the accident, but suffered several injuries, including a broken collarbone, a torn rib, and a broken breastbone. While he survived, his injuries were debilitating for the remainder of his life. In the early 1920s, Stapley was one of several LDS leaders instrumental in the design and construction of the Arizona Temple. Stapley died on April 15, 1942, in his home in Mesa.

== O. S. Stapley and Company ==
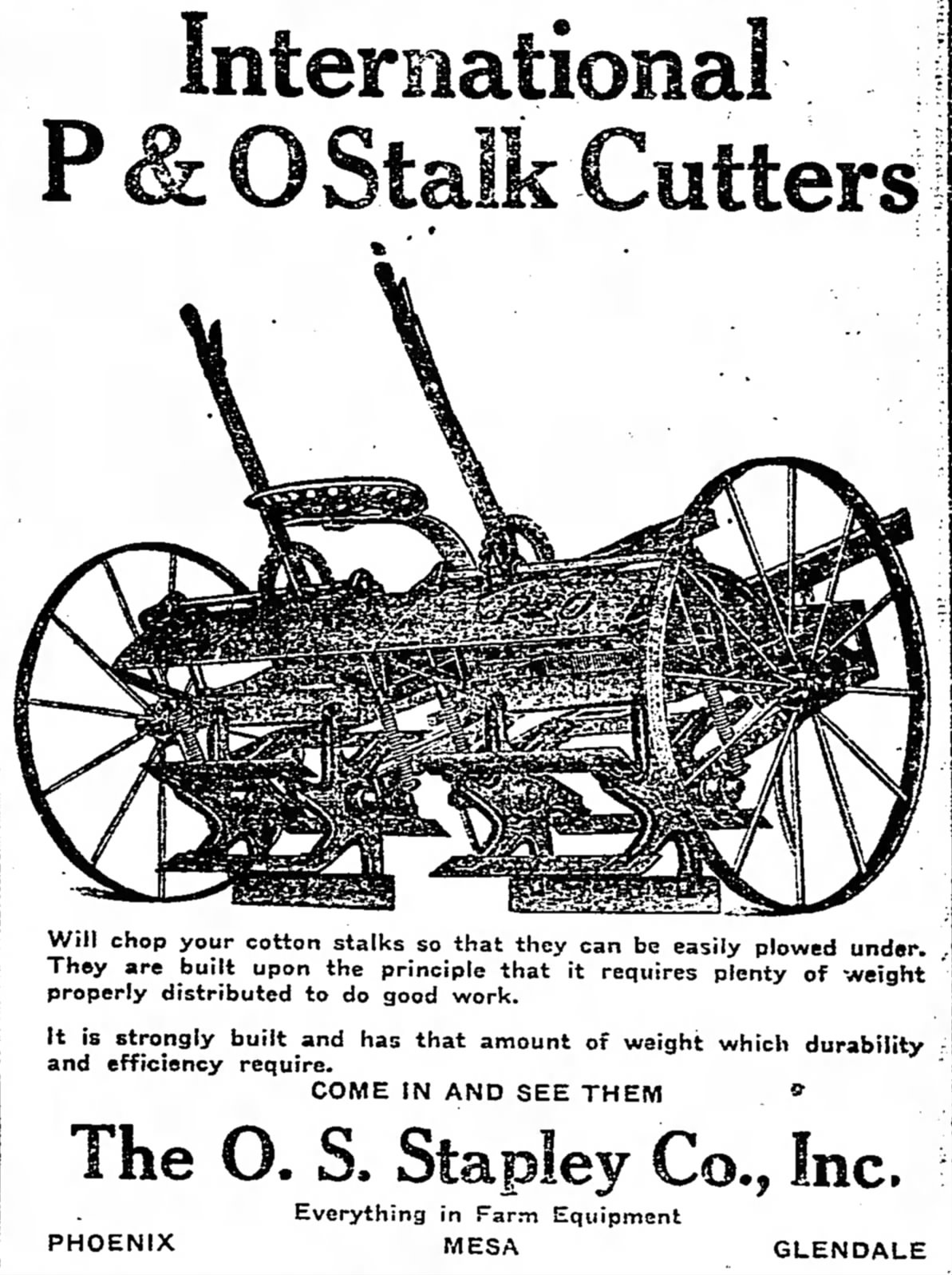
1918 newspaper ad for O. S. Stapley Co.

He operated O. S. Stapley's, a hardware store in Mesa, Arizona which he opened in 1893. By the 1940s, his mercantile business was the largest in Arizona.

On January 11, 1906, his store was destroyed in a major fire, which consumed five businesses in Mesa. The fire started in the furniture store of Passey & Metz, next door to Stapley's, but was exacerbated when some black powder stored in Stapley's caught fire and exploded. The loss to Stapley's was the complete destruction of his Store's building, and all the stock inside, estimated at $14,000, Stapley quickly rented a nearby building, the Peterson Building in which to run his store while his own store building was being set up in the Passey & Metz building, which he had purchased. He left on January 21 for San Francisco to replenish his store's lost stock. By the end of April, they were able to move into their new building, which was located on Main Street.

In June 1912, O. S. Stapley and Company opened a second store, on the corner of Robson and Main in Mesa. They moved all their furniture stock to the new location, while retaining the original store for their hardware business, which was housed in three buildings on the south side of Main Street. In October of that year, the two entities split, with Stapley selling off the furniture portion of his business to his two partners, J. W. Clark and J. S. Rogers. The new hardware company was simply called the O. S. Stapley Company. His second hardware store was opened in 1917 in Phoenix. It had entrances on both Grand Avenue and Seventh Avenue. In approximately 1908 he became the local dealer for the International Harvester Company, which had just been formed. He would eventually become the largest IHC dealer in the United States. 1919 saw Stapley open a third store, this time in Glendale. Stapley would open two other locations, one in Chandler, and the other in Buckeye.

== Political career ==
In the early 1900s he was a councilman in Mesa, Arizona. During this same period he also served as a trustee on the Mesa School Board.

In 1914, he declared his candidacy for the state senate from Maricopa County. Both of the incumbents were Democrats, C. B. Wood and H. A. Davis, but Wood was not running for re-election, due to his appointment by Woodrow Wilson to be the U. S. Postmaster for Phoenix. Davis did run, and along with Stapley, there were three other Democrats seeking the 2 nominations: Harry Johnson, J. A. R. Irvine, and Sam F. Webb. Stapley garnered the most votes in the Democrat's primary, while Webb eked out a victory over the incumbent, Davis. Stapley and Webb were elected in the November general election.

In 1916, both incumbents, O. S. Stapley and Webb had decided not to run for re-election. However, by April Stapley had changed his mind and decided to run. Heading into the primary, there developed two teams of candidates for the two Democrat nominations, Stapley along with W. T. Smith one side, with Davis, who had lost in the 1914 primary, and Paul Baxter Beville on the other. In the primary Davis finished first, with 2,997 votes, and Stapley second with 2,527, edging out Belville who received 2,452. However, Stapley and Davis were defeated in the general election, losing to the Republicans Ernest Hall and H. B. Wilkinson.

== Legacy ==
Powerhouse Road in Mesa was renamed Stapley Drive in his honor in 1960. Also named after him is Stapley Junior High School in Mesa.
