= Staunton Hill (Brookneal, Virginia) =

Historic house in Virginia, United States

- U.S. National Register of Historic Places
- Virginia Landmarks Register
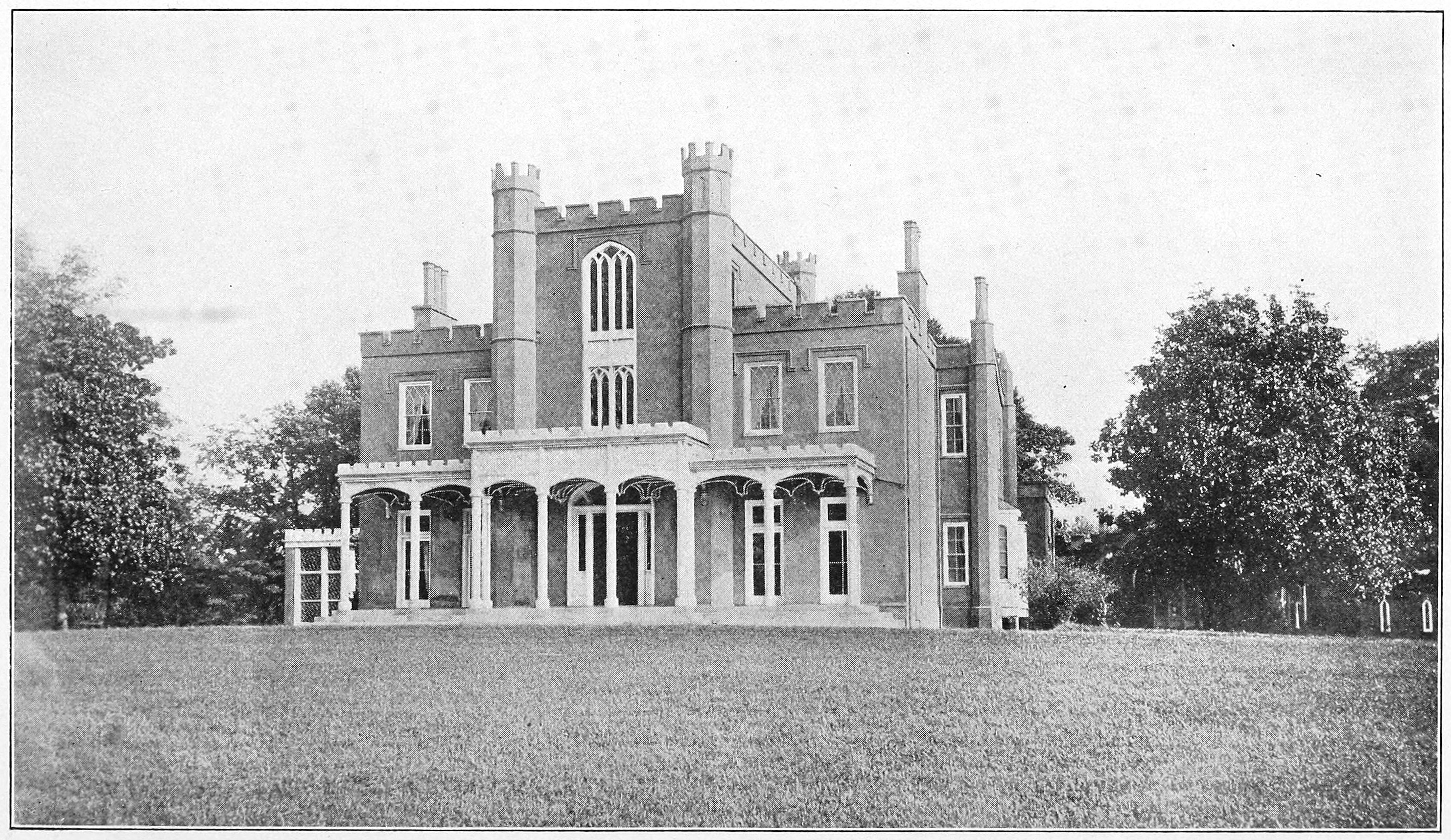
- Staunton Hill, c. 1910

- Location within Virginia Location within the United States
- Location: SW of jct. of Rtes. 619 and 693, near Brookneal, Virginia
- Coordinates: 37°0′27″N 78°51′59″W
- Area: 0 acres (0 ha)
- Built: 1848
- Architect: Johnson, James E.
- Architectural style: Gothic Revival
- NRHP reference No.: 69000229
- VLR No.: 019-0030

Significant dates
- Added to NRHP: October 1, 1969
- Designated VLR: November 5, 1968

Staunton Hill is a historic plantation house located in Charlotte County, Virginia; the nearest community is Brookneal, which is in Campbell County. It was built in 1848 by Charles Bruce (father of Sen. William Cabell Bruce) for his bride, Sarah Alexander Seddon, sister of future Confederate Secretary of War James Alexander Seddon. The two-story, five-bay, brick dwelling was designed by John Evans Johnson in the Gothic Revival style. It features a three-story projecting entrance tower at the center bay with Gothic arch windows, as well as a crenelated parapet and turrets.

It was listed on the National Register of Historic Places in 1969.
