= H. B. Wilkinson =

American politician (1870–1954)

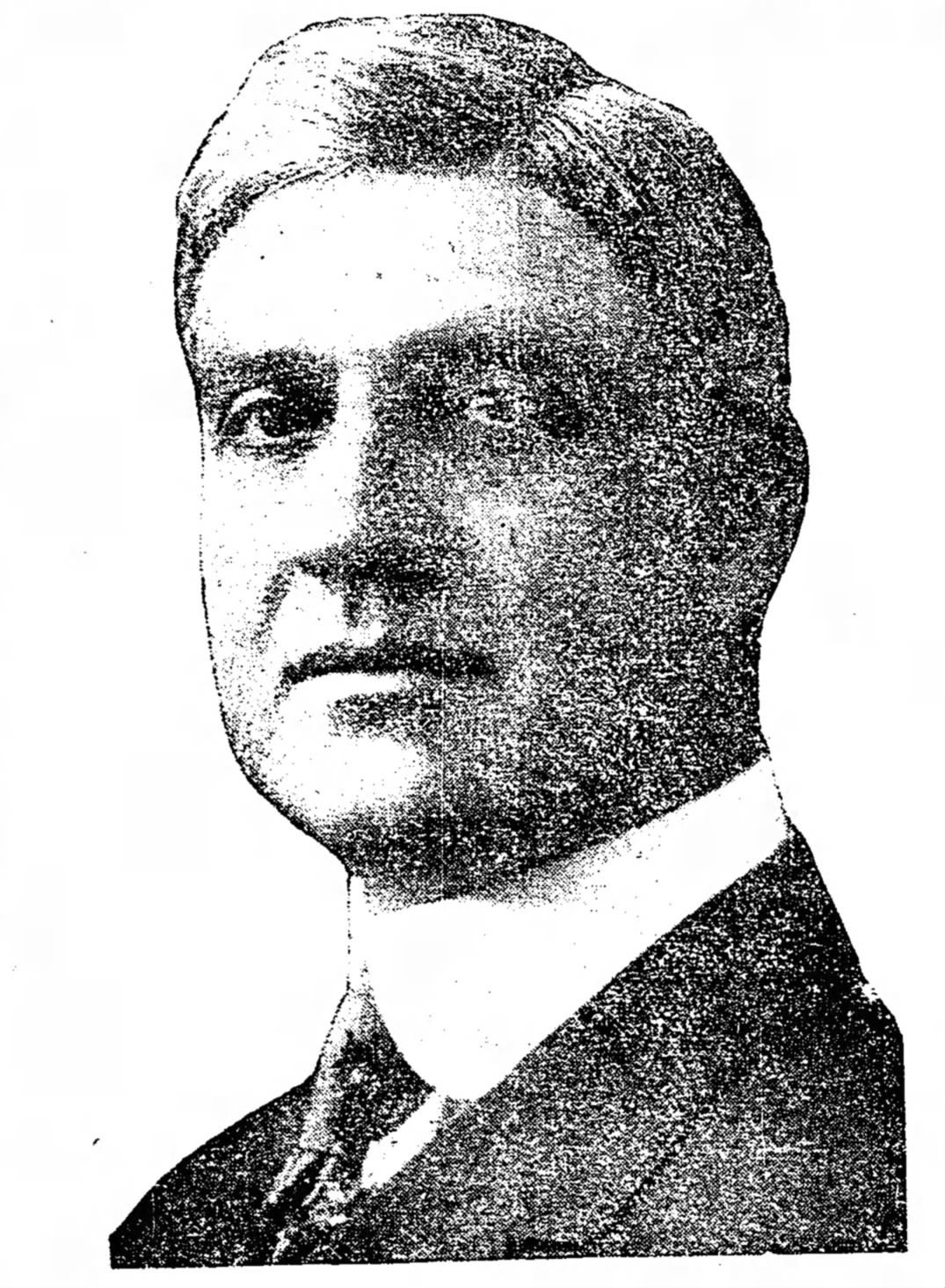
- Wilkinson c. 1916

Member of the Arizona Senate from the Maricopa County district
- In office January 1917 – December 1922
- Preceded by: O. S. Stapley; Sam F. Webb
- Succeeded by: H. C. Gilbert; J. C. Phillips

Personal details
- Born: Henry Bannister Wilkinson; July 31, 1870 Brookville, Indiana, U.S.
- Died: August 22, 1954 (aged 84) Phoenix, Arizona, U.S.
- Party: Republican
- Spouse: Mary Eleanor Adams (m. 1903)
- Children: 3
- Education: Northwestern University
- Profession: Lawyer

Henry Bannister Wilkinson (July 31, 1870 – August 22, 1954) was an American lawyer and politician who served three consecutive terms in the Arizona State Senate from 1918 to 1922, serving as the President of the Senate in his third term, during the 5th Arizona State Legislature. He unsuccessfully ran for several other offices, including in 1933, when Wilkinson lost in the first special election held in Arizona, for Arizona's sole congressional seat. He lost in a landslide to Democrat Isabella Greenway, who garnered 73% of the vote to become the first woman from Arizona to go to Congress. He was instrumental in bringing main line railroad service to Phoenix, Arizona; was one of the founders of what is known today as Banner - University Medical Center Phoenix; was a member of the Arizona State Bar for over fifty years, serving as its president one year; and was very active in the movement to improve the roads in Arizona.

== Personal life ==
Wilkinson was born in Brookville, Indiana, on July 31, 1870. His parents were R. H. Wilkinson, a minister, and Adelia Quackenbush, a schoolteacher. Wilkinson did his undergraduate work at Northwestern University. He also graduated from Northwestern with a law degree in 1898, after which he moved from Evanston, Illinois, to Phoenix, Arizona, where he remained the rest of his life. He was a member of the Delta Upsilon fraternity. He married Mary Eleanor Adams of Dundee, Illinois, on September 19, 1903. The couple had three children, all girls: Eleanor, Harriet, and Barbara. Wilkinson died on August 22, 1954, at a rest home in Phoenix, Arizona. He had been ill for several years but had only entered the facility four days before his death.

== Political career ==
In 1913 he became a member of the Committee of the One Hundred and Twenty Five, a citizen's representative group to discuss and help decide the framing and organization of Phoenix. One of the items discussed by the committee was the creation of a new charter for the city. As part of the process, the committee nominated fourteen of their number to run for the Board of Freeholders, who would draft the new charter. Wilkinson was chosen as one of those fourteen, and in May was elected to the Board. As a freeholder, he was a member of the subcommittee which crafted the powers and duties of the new position of city manager, as well as the members of the council. The freeholders proposed the new charter in August 1913, and it was accepted by the citizens, changing Phoenix's form of government from a mayor-council system to council-manager.

Wilkinson was a member of the Progressive Party, serving as county chairman in Maricopa County. However, in 1916, the Progressives did not field a separate ticket from the Republicans, and Wilkinson was one of three nominees from the Republican party for the two State Senate seats from Maricopa County. Dickinson and Ernest Hall became the Republican nominees. Wilkinson and Hall defeated O. S. Stapley, an incumbent, and H. A. Davis, who had served in the first Arizona State Senate, in the November general election. He ran for re-election in 1918; he and newcomer C. C. Green received the Republican nomination, being unopposed in the primaries. Both Republicans won in the general election in November. During the 4th Arizona State Legislature, Wilkinson authored a bill which created the Arizona Resources Board, which was enacted in 1919. The board was responsible for overseeing the water resources in Arizona, particularly for irrigation use.

In mid 1920, there was some discussion of Wilkinson running for Arizona's United States Senate seat. However, he chose to run for re-election to the State Senate instead and easily won re-election in November. When the 5th Arizona State Legislature was convened, the Republicans were in control of the senate, 10–9. Wilkinson was nominated and won the Presidency of the Senate by a vote of 10–9, although not along strictly party lines, since W. D. Claypool, the Democrats' choice for president, voted for Wilkinson, while Wilkinson voted for Claypool. Through the 1930s, Wilkinson would be the only Republican to serve as either the Senate President or Speaker of the House. During the 5th legislature, Wilkinson introduced Senate Bill 125, the "Governor's Cabinet Measure", which was a massive reorganization of the state government. The existing 35 boards were to be abolished and replaced with eight new departments: Military Affairs, Finance, Agriculture, Public Welfare, Public Works and Buildings, Reclamation and Irrigation, Education and Registration, and Labor and Industry. While the bill passed the Senate with a party-line vote of 10–9, it never made it out of the House's Committee on Efficient Government, which was controlled 4–3 by the Democrats. He did not run for re-election to the State Senate in 1922.

In 1932 Wilkinson ran for Arizona's lone Congressional seat. He won a hotly contested Republican primary against Benton Dick. However, he was soundly defeated in the November general election by the Democratic incumbent, Lewis W. Douglas, by more than a two-to-one margin, 75,469 to 29,710. In 1933, Douglas resigned from Congress to take the position of the United States Budget Director. A special election was held to replace him, the first in the history of Arizona. Wilkinson was chosen by the Republicans to represent them and went up against Isabella Greenway, representing the Democrats, and Dillworth Sumpter, representing the Socialists. Greenway won in a landslide with 73% of the vote. The Socialist, Sumpter, came in second. The election was also historic in that it was the first time in state history that a candidate of a minor political party received more votes than a candidate from one of the two major parties. The final tally was Greenway, 24,163; Sumpter, 5,556; and Wilkinson 3,123. In 1936 he ran for the Maricopa County Superior Court. While he won the Republican nomination, he was easily defeated by the Democratic incumbent, G. A. Rodgers.

== Career outside politics ==
He was one of the founders of the Phoenix Title and Trust Company, becoming its first president when it was incorporated in 1910. He was one of the founders of Banner - University Medical Center Phoenix, helping to raise the $40,000 needed to begin the construction of the hospital, and served as its chairman of the board from 1911 through 1921. At the time of its founding, it was called the Deaconess Hospital. He practiced law in Phoenix as a partner in the firm of Chalmers and Wilkinson. He was a president of the Arizona Bar Association, having served in that capacity in 1914.

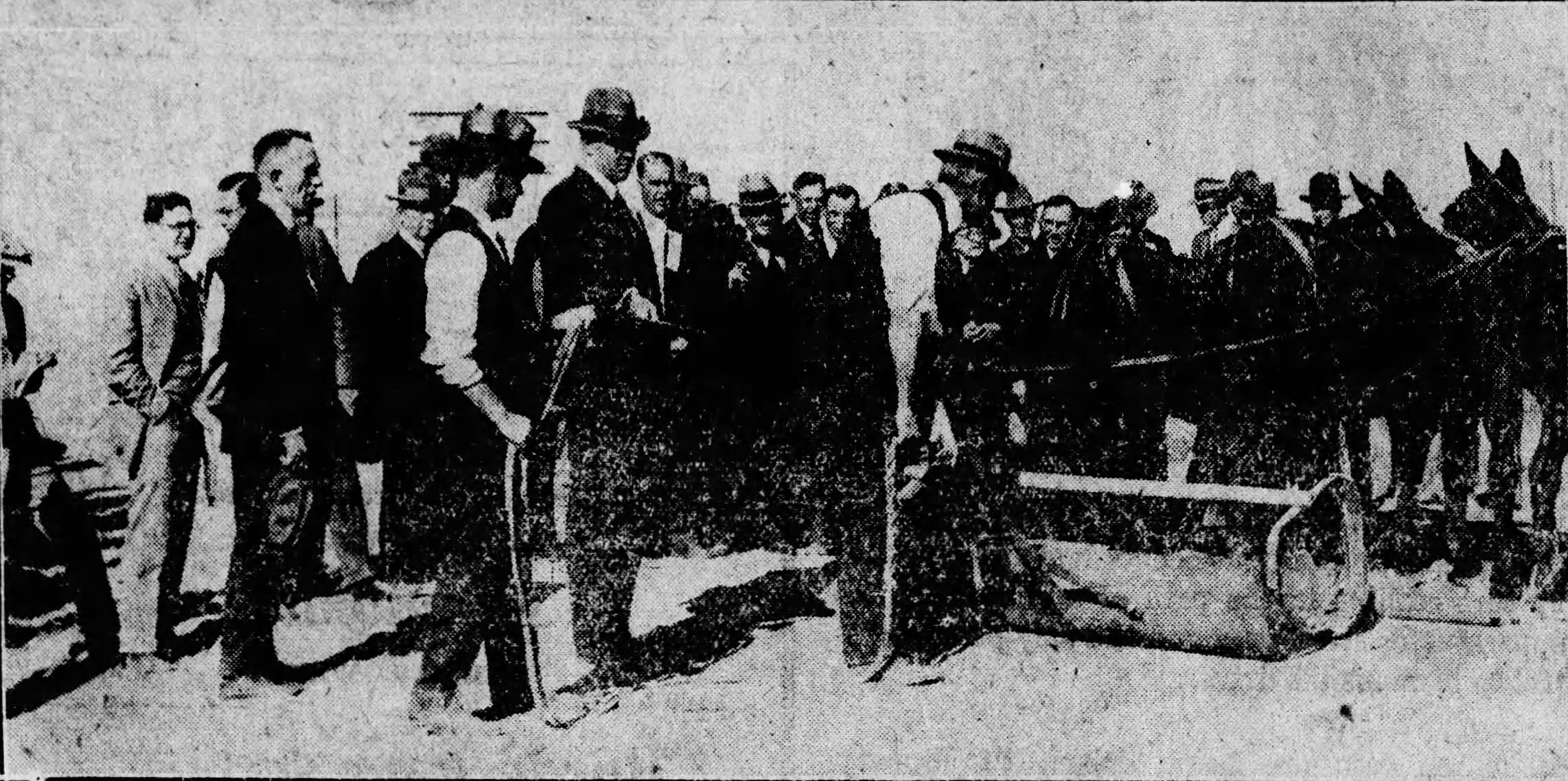
Opening of construction on Phoenix's Main Line

He was also the president of the Arizona Good Roads Association. In 1921 Wilkinson proposed the development of an economic bloc between Phoenix and Los Angeles, California. The first step to begin the process would be the creation of a highway running between the two cities, in order to promote commerce. The road was to run for 102 miles (164 km), between the Hassayampa River just west of Phoenix, and the Ehrenberg ferry on the Colorado River, outside of Ehrenberg, at a cost of $2.5 million. Wilkinson managed to get an amendment, Amendment 100, to the state constitution on the November 1922 ballot, which would allow the state to issue bonds to raise the money needed to build the road. However, the amendment did not pass.

In 1924, Wilkinson led the effort to get a main line railway through Phoenix. He was the president of the Tidewater Association, which spearheaded the project. The line would need to have had the Southern Pacific and El Paso and Southwestern railways merge, which needed approval from the Commerce Commission in Washington, D.C. The hearing took place in September, and Wilkinson was part of the Arizona contingent which traveled to the U.S. Capitol to argue in favor of the proposal. The requested merger was approved. Construction on the new line commenced in January 1925 near Picacho, with Wilkinson, along with F. J. Elliot, president of the Phoenix Chamber of Commerce, throwing out the first shovelful of dirt. The rail line was completed on June 6, 1926, when the last rail was laid about 72.5 miles (116.7 km) west of Hassayampa, linking the two sets of tracks being laid. Freight trains began operating over the line on June 17, and the passenger train service began on October 15.
