= H. A. Davis =

Arizona politician (1879–1946)

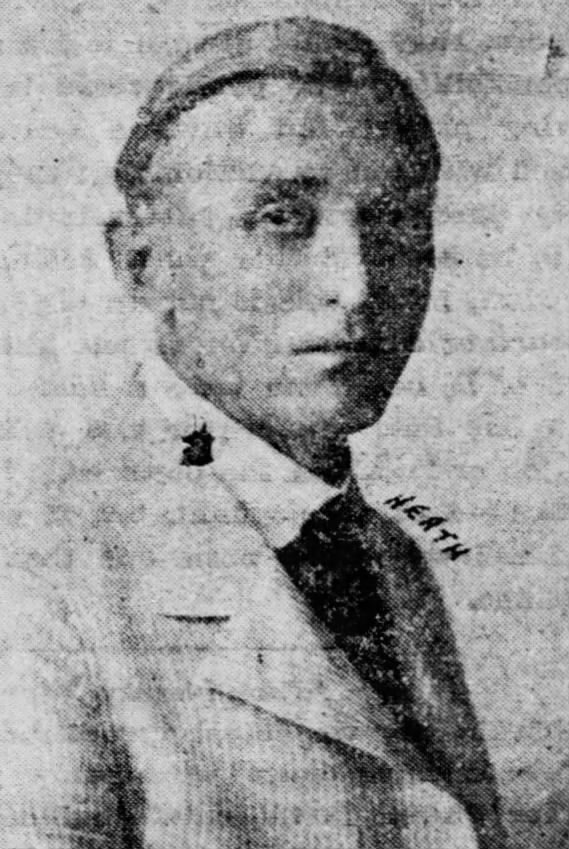
- Davis, ca. 1915

Member of the Arizona Senate from the Maricopa County district
- In office March 1912 – January 1915
- Preceded by: First Senator from Maricopa County
- Succeeded by: O. S. Stapley; Sam F. Webb

Personal details
- Born: 1879 Nebraska
- Died: February 2, 1946 (aged 66–67) Los Angeles, California
- Party: Democratic
- Spouse: Alice
- Profession: Politician

H. A. Davis (1879–1946) was an American politician from Arizona, who served as a senator in the 1st Arizona State Legislature. He was also a newspaperman and owned a printing business.

== Life ==
Davis was originally from Nebraska, born on a ranch there in 1879. In his younger years he worked as a miner in Colorado, and in the newspaper business in Texas, Louisiana, and Arkansas. He married Alice Greenhaugh in Iowa. In 1908 he moved to Arizona, where he went to work for the Arizona Daily Star in Tucson.

Davis was a newspaperman, and in 1909 was the editor of the Parker Herald, and by 1911 was the owner of the State Press Printing Company.

Davis died from a heart attack on February 2, 1946, in Los Angeles, California.

== Political career ==
He was one of four candidates for the two senate seats in Maricopa County in the Democrat primary held on October 24, 1911. He came in second to C.B. Wood in the Democrat primary, and they both won the general election in December 1911. When the legislature convened in March 1912, Davis was made chairman of the Public Lands and Municipal Corporations Committee, as well as sitting on two other committees. In 1912, he was accused of being involved in a graft scheme involving his State Printing company and the awarding of government printing contracts. Also in 1912, there was a debate regarding whether or not there should be another election in 1912, following the 1911 election. Davis led the fight barring the election, stating the opinion that such an election would be illegal under the Arizona Constitution. After several lower court defeats, the state supreme court officially sided with Davis, making the next election scheduled for 1914. The disagreement grew out of the provision in the Arizona Constitution that state elections would be held in "even numbered years". However, the court ruled, when the constitution was written, it was expected that statehood would be granted in 1911, but that statehood was held up until 1912, so the intent of the constitution was to hold the next election in the next even numbered year after statehood.

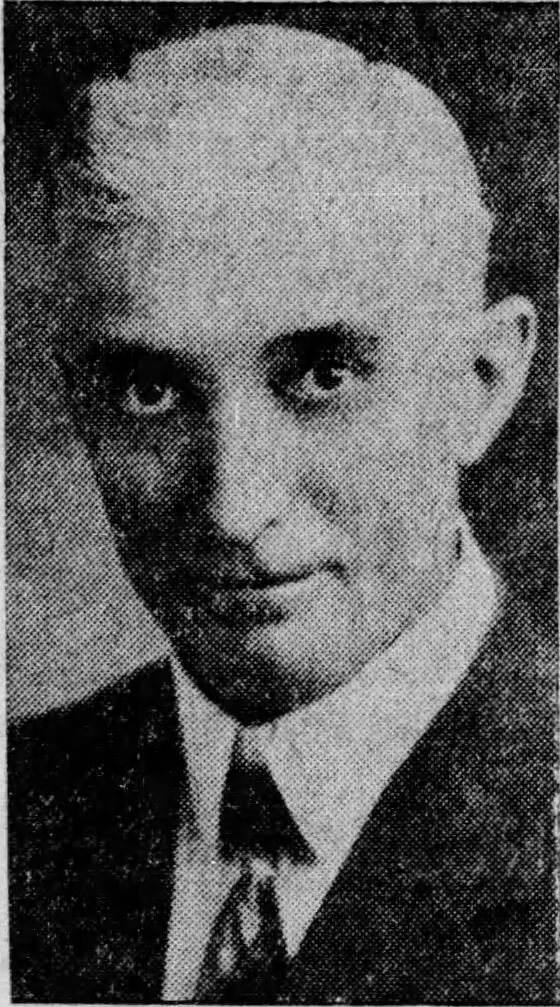
Davis in 1926

Davis was a steadfast supporter of Women's Suffrage. He gave many reasons whenever asked why he supported it, including, "Nobody questions a man's right to the voting franchise just because he is male. Men themselves have wisely curtailed the ballot to a certain age, to defined conditions and in many states to educational requirements. Just why women should be classed with children, the uneducated, criminals and idiots in the division of the human family who are denied the suffrage privilege has always surpassed my comprehension. He campaigned extensively for suffrage during 1912, and expressed optimism over its passage in the November 1912 election. Davis was successful in his campaign, and the referendum giving women the right to vote in Arizona passed by a 2–1 margin on November 5, 1912. Following the passage of the suffrage referendum, Davis authored a bill to expedite the registration of women voters to ensure they were eligible to vote in the next election. The bill passed both the senate and the house in March 1913.

In that first legislative term, Davis was also the author of the Davis University Timber Act, which regulated the extraction of timber from lands controlled by the state university, and mandated the sale dollars to be added to the permanent endowment of the school. In 1914, during an address at the University of Arizona, Davis advocated eradicating all fees and tuition for students at the university. He felt that the loss in revenue could be made up from other sources, particularly better management of the income derived from lands owned by the university. In 1913 it was reported that Davis was one of five democrats in the state senate who would run for governorship in 1914. However, by July 1914, Davis had turned his attention from the governor's seat to running for re-election to the state senate, and in August he officially announced his candidacy for the state senate. During the September Democrat primary, Davis came in third, behind O. S. Stapley, who finished first, and Sam F. Webb. Webb finished with 2,423 votes to Davis' 2,285, a lead of 138. Davis filed a petition for recount, alleging that there were canvassing irregularities in 9 districts. The petition was heard by the superior court, who ruled that a recount of those 9 districts should go forward. In the recount, Davis gained 58 votes while Webb lost 45, however that net difference of 103 was not enough to overcome the initial outcome of the election, and Webb was declared the Democratic nominee.

In 1916, Davis again announced his intention to run for the state senate. Both incumbents, O. S. Stapley and Sam F. Webb had decided not to run for re-election. Heading into the primary, there developed two teams of candidates for the two Democratic nominations, Davis and Paul Baxter Beville on one side, versus O. S. Stapley and W. T. Smith on the other, Stapley having changed his mind about running for re-election. In the primary Davis finished first, with 2,997 votes, and Stapley second with 2,527, edging out Belville who received 2,452. The two Democrats were defeated in the general election, losing to Ernest Hall and H. B. Wilkinson.

1924 saw Davis once again throw his hat into the ring for state senator from Maricopa. He came in second in the primary with 2,522 votes behind J. J. Cox who garnered 5,337, but ahead of incumbent Hugh C. Gilbert, who came in third with 2,150 votes. In November, the two Democrats defeated their Republican opponents, with Cox coming in first with 12, 256 votes and Davis tallied 10,564. During his term in office, like is contemporary Fred Sutter, he opposed ratification of the Colorado River Compact. In April 1926, Davis announced his intention to run for the Democratic nomination as a candidate for the U.S. House of Representatives, with the primary being held in September. In the primary, Davis finished a distant fourth in a field of five candidates, receiving only 3,627 votes, while the winner, Lewis Williams Douglas received 18,452. In 1928, having not run for the state senate re-election in 1926, he declared his intention to seek the Maricopa seat once again. However, Davis finished third in the Democrat primary, behind eventual winners, Allan K. Perry and J. G. Peterson.
