= Celora E. Martin =

American judge

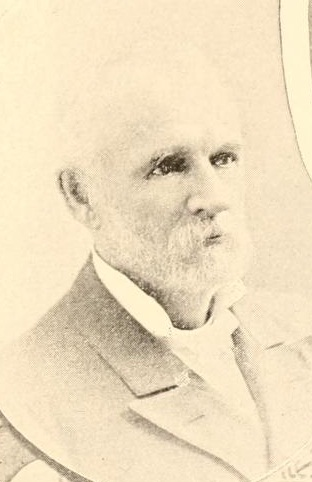
Celora E. Martin (1902)

Celora Eaton Martin (March 23, 1834 – September 10, 1909) was an American lawyer and politician from New York.

== Life ==
He was born on March 23, 1834, in Newport, Herkimer County, New York, the son of Ellis Martin and Lucetta (Brayton) Martin.

He studied law in the office of John C. Harris in Newport, was admitted to the bar in 1856, and commenced practice in Rhode Island. The next year, he returned to New York and practiced law in Whitney Point, New York, but soon removed to Binghamton, New York and formed a partnership with Orlow W. Chapman. On September 23, 1857, Martin married Almanza R. Barney (d. 1898), of Newport, and they had three daughters.

In 1877, he was appointed by Governor Lucius Robinson to the New York Supreme Court (6th District) to fill a vacancy. Later that year, he was elected on the Republican and Democratic tickets to a fourteen-year term, and re-elected on both tickets in 1891. From 1887 on, he sat on the General Term (4th Department).

At the New York state election, 1895, he was elected on the Republican ticket to a fourteen-year term on the New York Court of Appeals. He remained on the bench until the end of 1904 when he reached the constitutional age limit. On September 4, 1901, he married Ada L. Mills.

He died on September 10, 1909.

Secretary of the Territory of Arizona Isaac T. Stoddard (1851–1914) was his son-in-law.

== Sources ==
- STATE OFFICERS ELECTED; Sketches of Republicans Who Were Victorious in New-York in NYT on November 6, 1895
- "Celora E. Martin" at Martin House
