= Charles H. Akers =

American politician and businessman (1857–1924)

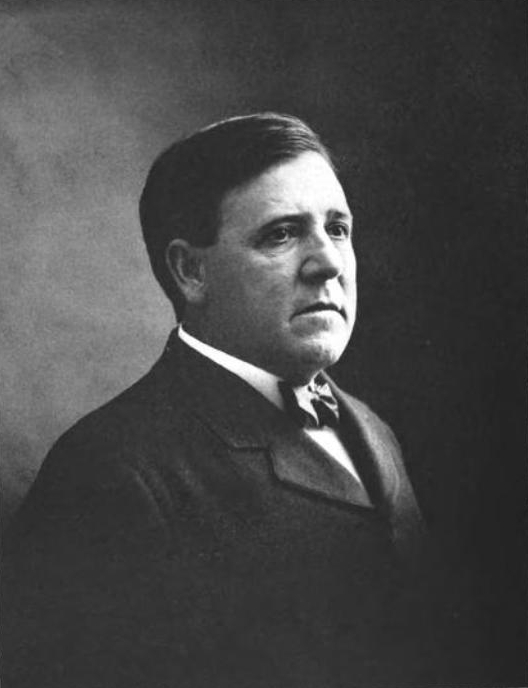

11th Secretary of Arizona Territory
- In office July 1, 1897 – June 1901
- Nominated by: William McKinley
- Preceded by: Charles Morelle Bruce
- Succeeded by: Isaac T. Stoddard

Personal details
- Born: September 21, 1857 Millersburg, Iowa, U.S.
- Died: April 14, 1924 (aged 66) Phoenix, Arizona, U.S.
- Resting place: Greenwood Memorial Park; Phoenix, Arizona, U.S.
- Party: Republican/Democratic
- Spouse(s): Emily Herndon Philpot (m. 1889; d. 1889) (Note: Different sources spell the maiden name of Akers' first wife in various ways, including Philpot, Phillpot, and Philpott.) Jennie Bryan (m. 1891)

Charles Henry Akers (September 21, 1857 – April 14, 1924) was an American politician and businessman. Politically, he began as a Republican and served as Secretary of Arizona Territory as well as a delegate to several national conventions. Akers switch to the Democratic party after leaving office. His later business interests included being publisher of the Arizona Gazette.

== Biography ==
Akers was born on September 21, 1857, in Millersburg, Iowa, to Dr. John H. and Almerine (Harbaugh) Akers. His father moved the family to Shawnee, Kansas, in 1859 where the younger Akers attended school. At age 15, and "being of a roving disposition", his parents granted him permission to leave home. Akers went to Denver, Colorado, and worked at a brickyard for three months before taking a position herding horses and mules for a business contracting with a railroad. After two-and-a-half years herding, he returned home and attended school for several months. He again left home in early 1875 and went to Creston, Iowa, where he worked as a cattle buyer. To these duties he added management of the local fire department.

A mining boom in Leadville, Colorado, prompted Akers to try his hand at prospecting. He arrived in Leadville in July 1879 and prospected in the region until December 1880. Akers then left for Arizona Territory, arriving in Prescott on February 1, 1881. Without funds upon his arrival, he worked for several months at a sawmill before returning to his prospecting efforts. He was successful in his efforts this time and able to sell his claim for a profit. Akers spent the next two-and-a-half years working as a sutler at Fort Verde. In January 1885, he returned to prospecting and spent two years working in the area of Tip Top, Arizona Territory. Unsuccessful this time, he took a job with the Maricopa and Phoenix and Salt River Valley Railroad when his funds ran out.

Returning to Prescott in early 1888, he took a job as a bookkeeper for a local merchant. Later that year, he was elected recorder for Yavapai County. In the process he became the first Republican to win the office in the predominately Democratic district. Akers held the office for two terms, winning reelection in 1890. In 1892, Akers lost a race to be elected Yavapai County sheriff. In January 1893, he became clerk for the Yavapai County Board of Supervisors. He remained at the position till the end of 1896. From 1894 til 1896, Akers was chairman of the county Republican committee and served as a delegate to the 1896 Republican National Convention.

Akers married Emily Herndon Philpot on April 10, 1889. She died on May 26, 1889, while the couple were still on their honeymoon. Akers wed a second time on December 1, 1891, when he married Jennie Bryan in Phoenix. The union produced three sons: John, Bryan, and Harlow. Socially, Akers was a Freemason and member of the Ancient Order of United Workmen, Benevolent and Protective Order of Elks, Knights of Pythias, and Woodmen of the World.

President William McKinley nominated Akers to become Secretary of Arizona Territory on May 19, 1897, and the Senate granted confirmation on June 5. Akers took office on July 1. His first actions were to retain the services of the young lady who oversaw the territorial library under his predecessor and appoint Harry Tritle as his personal assistant. Following orders from Washington, D.C., The new secretary removed Governor Benjamin Joseph Franklin from office on July 22 and served as Acting Governor until Governor Myron H. McCord took office on July 29. Akers served as secretary under Governors McCord and Murphy, filling in as Acting Governor whenever either chief executive left the territory. He was unanimously elected to serve as a delegate to the 1900 Republican National Convention. During the convention he was a member of the committee on platforms and resolutions. Akers requested reappointment in a letter to the President dated April 25, 1901. President McKinley instead nominated Isaac T. Stoddard to replace him on June 5, 1901.

After leaving office, Akers established the Akers Incorporating Company, becoming the firms President and General Manager. In 1904 the firm acquired the Arizona Gazette and he served as the newspapers publisher until his death. The former secretary also change political parties, becoming a member of the Democratic party. Akers secretary made several trips to Washington to lobby for Arizona statehood and was an advocate for construction of the Theodore Roosevelt Dam. With Arizona statehood, he became a supporter of Governor George W. P. Hunt although the two men had a falling out for several years before reconciling their differences. During his latter years, the former secretary lobbied to reroute the mail line of the Southern Pacific Railroad through Phoenix. Akers died on April 14, 1924. He was buried in Phoenix's Greenwood Memorial Park.
