= List of United States representatives in the 65th Congress =

This is a complete list of United States representatives during the 65th United States Congress listed by seniority. For the most part, representatives are ranked by the beginning of their terms in office.

As an historical article, the districts and party affiliations listed reflect those during the 65th Congress (March 4, 1917 – March 3, 1919). Seats and party affiliations on similar lists for other congresses will be different for certain members.

This article describes the criteria for seniority in the House of Representatives and sets out the list of members by seniority. It is prepared on the basis of the interpretation of seniority applied to the House of Representatives in the current congress. In the absence of information to the contrary, it is presumed that the twenty-first-century practice is identical to the seniority customs used during the 65th Congress.

== Seniority ==
=== House seniority ===
Seniority in the House, for representatives with unbroken service, depends on the date on which the members first term began. That date is either the start of the Congress (4 March in odd numbered years, for the era up to and including the 73rd Congress starting in 1933) or the date of a special election during the Congress. Since many members start serving on the same day as others, ranking between them is based on alphabetical order by the last name of the representative. If there is still a tie, then the first names are used.

Representatives who return to the House, after having previously served, are credited with service equal to one less than the total number of terms they served. When a representative has served a prior term of less than two terms (i.e., prior term minus one equals less than one), the member is ranked above all others whose service begins on the same day.

=== Committee seniority ===
At the start of the 65th Congress in 1917, the committee assignments were made by each party and then formally approved by the whole House. Each party controlled the committee ranking of its members, but usually this followed the order of seniority of members in terms of service on the committee. It became customary for members of a committee, in the previous congress, to be re-appointed at the start of the next.

A seniority rule was normally used to decide committee chairmen. The chairman was likely to be the majority member of a committee, with the longest continuous service on it. However, party leadership was typically not associated with seniority.

Out of a group of fifty five standing committee chairmen, at the start of this Congress, Nelson Polsby identified forty five as the most senior member of the majority on the committee. In seven other cases, senior majority members were compensated for not being chairman of the committee (five chaired another committee and two received better committee assignments than in the previous Congress). In three instances there was no obvious compensation for the apparent violation of the seniority custom.

== Committees ==
This list refers to the standing committees of the House in the 65th Congress, the year of establishment as a standing committee (adoption of the name used in 1917), the number of members assigned to the committee and the corresponding committee in the current congress. Because of consolidation of committees and changes of jurisdiction, it is not always possible to identify a clear successor panel.

No.	1917 committee	Established	Members	2011 committee
1	Accounts	1805	11	House Administration
2	Agriculture	1820	21	Agriculture
3	Alcoholic Liquor Traffic	1893	11	Judiciary
4	Appropriations	1865	21	Appropriations
5	Banking and Currency	1865	21	Financial Services
6	Census	1901	16	Oversight and Government Reform
7	Claims	1794	16	Judiciary
8	Coinage, Weights and Measures	1864 (1867)	18	Financial Services
9	Disposition of Executive Papers	1911	2	House Administration
10	District of Columbia	1808	21	Oversight and Government Reform
11	Education	1867 (1883)	15	Education and the Workforce
12	Election of President, Vice President and Representatives	1893	13	House Administration
13	Elections No. 1	1789 (1895)	9	House Administration
14	Elections No. 2	1895	9	House Administration
15	Elections No. 3	1895	9	House Administration
16	Enrolled Bills	1876	7	House Administration
17	Expenditures in the Agriculture Department	1889	7	Oversight and Government Reform
18	Expenditures in the Commerce Department	1903 (1913)	7	Oversight and Government Reform
19	Expenditures in the Interior Department	1860	7	Oversight and Government Reform
20	Expenditures in the Justice Department	1874	7	Oversight and Government Reform
21	Expenditures in the Labor Department	1913	7	Oversight and Government Reform
22	Expenditures in the Navy Department	1816	7	Oversight and Government Reform
23	Expenditures in the Post Office Department	1816	7	Oversight and Government Reform
24	Expenditures in the State Department	1816	7	Oversight and Government Reform
25	Expenditures in the Treasury Department	1816	7	Oversight and Government Reform
26	Expenditures in the War Department	1816	7	Oversight and Government Reform
27	Expenditures on Public Buildings	1816	7	Oversight and Government Reform
28	Foreign Affairs	1822	21	Foreign Affairs
29	Immigration and Naturalization	1893	15	Judiciary
30	Indian Affairs	1821	19	Natural Resources
31	Industrial Arts and Expositions	1903	16	Foreign Affairs
32	Insular Affairs	1899	21	Natural Resources
33	Interstate and Foreign Commerce	1795 (1892)	21	Energy and Commerce
34	Invalid Pensions	1831	16	Veterans' Affairs
35	Irrigation of Arid Lands	1893	13	Natural Resources
36	Judiciary	1813	21	Judiciary
37	Labor	1883	13	Education and the Workforce
38	Merchant Marine and Fisheries	1887	21	...
39	Mileage	1837	5	House Administration
40	Military Affairs	1822	21	Armed Services
41	Mines and Mining	1865	14	Natural Resources
42	Naval Affairs	1822	21	Armed Services
43	Patents	1837	14	Judiciary
44	Pensions	1880	15	Veterans' Affairs
45	Post Office and Post Roads	1808	21	Oversight and Government Reform
46	Public Buildings and Grounds	1837	20	Transportation and Infrastructure
47	Public Lands	1805	21	Natural Resources
48	Railways and Canals	1831 (1869)	14	Transportation and Infrastructure
49	Reform in the Civil Service	1893	13	Oversight and Government Reform
50	Revision of Laws	1868	13	Judiciary
51	Rivers and Harbors	1883	21	Transportation and Infrastructure
52	Roads	1913	21	Transportation and Infrastructure
53	Rules	1880	11	Rules
54	Territories	1825	17	Natural Resources
55	War Claims	1825 (1873)	15	Judiciary
56	Ways and Means	1802	22	Ways and Means
57	Woman Suffrage	1917	13	...
Joint Committees (House standing committee members only)
Jt 1	Library Joint	1806	5	House Administration
Jt 2	Printing Joint	1846	3	House Administration

== List of representatives by seniority ==
A numerical rank is assigned to each of the 435 members initially elected to the 65th Congress. Other members, who joined the House during the Congress, are not assigned a number. Three Representatives-elect died before the Congress started and one resigned after the legal start of the term without qualifying. The list below includes those Representatives-elect (with names in italics), with the seniority they would have held if they had been able to be sworn in.

Major party designations used in this article are D for Democratic members and R for Republican representatives. Other designations include Ind for Independent, Prog for Progressive, Proh for Prohibition and Soc for Socialist.

U.S. House seniority
Rank	Representative	Party	District	Seniority date	Notes
Twenty-one non-consecutive terms
1	Joseph G. Cannon	R	IL-18	March 4, 1915	Previously served 1873–91 and 1893–1913 while in the House.
Fourteen consecutive terms
2	William A. Jones	D	VA-1	March 4, 1891	Dean of the House. Chairman: Insular Affairs. Died on April 17, 1918, while still serving in the House.
Thirteen consecutive terms
3	Henry A. Cooper	R	WI-1	March 4, 1893	Last term while serving in the House until 67th Congress
4	Frederick H. Gillett	R	MA-2	March 4, 1893	
Twelve non-consecutive terms
5	James B. (Champ) Clark	D	MO-9	March 4, 1897	Speaker of the House. Previously served 1893–95 while in the House.
Eleven consecutive terms
6	William C. Adamson	D	GA-4	March 4, 1897	Chairman: Interstate and Foreign Commerce. Resigned on December 18, 1917, while still serving in the House.
7	Thomas S. Butler	R	PA-7	March 4, 1897	Independent Republican, 1897–99
8	Edward L. Hamilton	R	MI-4	March 4, 1897	
9	James R. Mann	R	IL-2	March 4, 1897	Minority Leader
10	John A. Moon	D	TN-3	March 4, 1897	Chairman: Post Office and Post Roads
11	Thetus W. Sims	D	TN-8	March 4, 1897	Chairman: Interstate and Foreign Commerce (1917)
12	James L. Slayden	D	TX-14	March 4, 1897	Last term while serving in the House.
13	William S. Greene	R	MA-15	May 31, 1898	Republican Conference Chairman
Eleven non-consecutive terms
14	George E. Foss	R	IL-10	March 4, 1915	Previously served 1895–1913 while in the House. Last term while serving in the House.
15	Ebenezer J. Hill	R	CT-4	March 4, 1915	Previously served 1895–1913 while in the House. Died on September 27, 1917, while still serving in the House.
16	Frank W. Mondell	R	WY-al	March 4, 1899	Previously served 1895–97 while in the House.
17	Cyrus A. Sulloway	R	NH-1	March 4, 1915	Previously served 1895–1913 while in the House. Died March 11, 1917, while serving in the House.
18	Richard W. Parker	D	NJ-9	December 1, 1914	Previously served 1895–1911 while in the House. Last term until 67th Congress while serving in the House.
Ten consecutive terms
19	John L. Burnett	D	AL-7	March 4, 1899	Chairman: Immigration and Naturalization
20	John J. Esch	R	WI-7	March 4, 1899	
21	David E. Finley	D	SC-5	March 4, 1899	Died, as Representative-elect, January 26, 1917
22	John J. Fitzgerald	D	NY-7	March 4, 1899	Chairman: Appropriations. Resigned on December 31, 1917, while still serving in the House.
23	Joseph W. Fordney	R	MI-8	March 4, 1899	
24	Gilbert N. Haugen	R	IA-4	March 4, 1899	
25	William W. Rucker	D	MO-2	March 4, 1899	Chairman: Election of President, Vice President and Representatives
26	John H. Small	D	NC-1	March 4, 1899	Chairman: Rivers and Harbors
27	Dorsey W. Shackleford	D	MO-8	August 29, 1899	Chairman: Roads. Last term while serving in the House.
Nine consecutive terms
28	Ezekiel S. Candler, Jr.	D	MS-1	March 4, 1901	
29	Henry D. Flood	D	VA-10	March 4, 1901	Chairman: Foreign Affairs
30	Claude Kitchin	D	NC-2	March 4, 1901	Chairman: Ways and Means. Majority Leader.
31	Lemuel P. Padgett	D	TN-7	March 4, 1901	Chairman: Naval Affairs
32	Edward W. Pou	D	NC-4	March 4, 1901	Chairman: Rules
33	Asbury F. Lever	D	SC-7	November 5, 1901	Chairman: Agriculture
34	Augustus P. Gardner	R	MA-6	November 4, 1902	Resigned on May 15, 1917, while still serving in the House.
35	Carter Glass	D	VA-6	November 4, 1902	Chairman: Banking and Currency. Resigned on December 16, 1918, while still serving in the House.
Nine non-consecutive terms
36	James H. Davidson	R	WI-6	March 4, 1917	Previously served 1897–1913 while in the House. Died on August 6, 1918, while still serving in the House.
37	Julius Kahn	R	CA-4	March 4, 1905	Previously served 1899–1903 while in the House.
38	J. Frederick Talbott	D	MD-2	March 4, 1909	Previously served 1879–85 and 1893–95 while in the House. Died on October 5, 1918, while still serving in the House.
Eight consecutive terms
39	Philip P. Campbell	R	KS-3	March 4, 1903	
40	Charles R. Davis	R	MN-3	March 4, 1903	
41	John N. Garner	D	TX-15	March 4, 1903	
42	Alexander W. Gregg	D	TX-7	March 4, 1903	Chairman: War Claims. Last term while serving in the House.
43	Benjamin G. Humphreys	D	MS-3	March 4, 1903	Chairman: Flood Control
44	Moses P. Kinkaid	R	NE-6	March 4, 1903	
45	Henry T. Rainey	D	IL-20	March 4, 1903	
46	J. Swagar Sherley	D	KY-5	March 4, 1903	Chairman: Appropriations (1918). Last term while serving in the House.
47	Halvor Steenerson	R	MN-9	March 4, 1903	
48	Andrew J. Volstead	R	MN-7	March 4, 1903	
49	Edwin Y. Webb	D	NC-9	March 4, 1903	Chairman: Judiciary
50	J. Thomas Heflin	D	AL-5	May 19, 1904	
Eight non-consecutive terms
51	William A. Rodenberg	R	IL-22	March 4, 1915	Previously served 1899–1901 and 1903–13 while in the House.
52	Daniel J. Riordan	D	NY-11	November 6, 1906	Previously served 1899–1901 while in the House.
Seven consecutive terms
53	Thomas M. Bell	D	GA-9	March 4, 1905	
54	Frank Clark	D	FL-2	March 4, 1905	Chairman: Public Buildings and Grounds
55	Lincoln Dixon	D	IN-4	March 4, 1905	Last term while serving in the House.
56	Finis J. Garrett	D	TN-9	March 4, 1905	Chairman: Insular Affairs (1918)
57	Everis A. Hayes	R	CA-8	March 4, 1905	Last term while serving in the House.
58	William C. Houston	D	TN-5	March 4, 1905	Chairman: Territories. Last term while serving in the House.
59	Gordon Lee	D	GA-7	March 4, 1905	
60	Martin B. Madden	R	IL-1	March 4, 1905	
61	John T. Watkins	D	LA-4	March 4, 1905	Chairman: Revision of Laws
62	John M. Nelson	R	WI-3	September 4, 1906	Last term while serving in the House until 67th Congress.
63	J. Hampton Moore	R	PA-3	November 6, 1906	
64	Edward W. Saunders	D	VA-5	November 6, 1906	Democratic Caucus Chairman
Seven non-consecutive terms
65	Charles E. Fuller	R	IL-12	March 4, 1915	Previously served 1903–13 while in the House.
66	Courtney W. Hamlin	D	MO-7	March 4, 1907	Previously served 1903–05 while in the House. Chairman: Expenditures in the State Department. Last term while serving in the House.
67	Nicholas Longworth	R	OH-1	March 4, 1915	Previously served 1903–13 while in the House.
68	Isaac R. Sherwood	D	OH-9	March 4, 1907	Previously served (R) 1873–75 while in the House. Chairman: Invalid Pensions.
69	William H. Stafford	R	WI-5	March 4, 1913	Previously served 1903–11 while in the House. Last term while serving in the House until 67th Congress
70	John A. Sterling	R	IL-17	March 4, 1915	Previously served 1903–13 while in the House. Died on October 17, 1918, while still serving in the House.
71	William W. Wilson	R	IL-3	March 4, 1915	Previously served 1903–13 while in the House.
72	Charles F. Booher	D	MO-4	March 4, 1907	Previously served February 19-March 3, 1889, while in the House.
Six consecutive terms
73	Joshua W. Alexander	D	MO-3	March 4, 1907	Chairman: Merchant Marine and Fisheries
74	William A. Ashbrook	D	OH-17	March 4, 1907	Chairman: Coinage, Weights and Measures
75	William J. Cary	R	WI-4	March 4, 1907	Last term while serving in the House.
76	William E. Cox	D	IN-3	March 4, 1907	Last term while serving in the House.
77	George W. Fairchild	R	NY-34	March 4, 1907	Last term while serving in the House.
78	Martin D. Foster	D	IL-23	March 4, 1907	Chairman: Mines and Mining. Last term while serving in the House.
79	Hannibal L. Godwin	D	NC-6	March 4, 1907	Chairman: Reform in the Civil Service
80	James A. Hamill	D	NJ-12	March 4, 1907	Chairman: Elections No. 2
81	Rufus Hardy	D	TX-6	March 4, 1907	Chairman: Expenditures in the Navy Department
82	Willis C. Hawley	R	OR-1	March 4, 1907	
83	Harvey Helm	D	KY-8	March 4, 1907	Chairman: Census. Died March 3, 1919, while still serving in the House.
84	Cordell Hull	D	TN-4	March 4, 1907	
85	Ben Johnson	D	KY-4	March 4, 1907	Chairman: District of Columbia
86	Charles A. Kennedy	R	IA-1	March 4, 1907	
87	John W. Langley	R	KY-10	March 4, 1907	
88	James C. McLaughlin	R	MI-9	March 4, 1907	
89	Adolph J. Sabath	D	IL-5	March 4, 1907	Chairman: Alcohol Liquor Traffic
90	Daniel R. Anthony, Jr.	R	KS-1	May 23, 1907	
91	Charles C. Carlin	D	VA-8	November 5, 1907	
92	Charles D. Carter	D	OK-3	November 16, 1907	Chairman: Indian Affairs
93	Scott Ferris	D	OK-6	November 16, 1907	Chairman: Public Lands
94	C. Bascom Slemp	R	VA-9	December 17, 1907	
95	Henry A. Barnhart	D	IN-13	November 3, 1908	Last term while serving in the House.
96	Albert Estopinal	D	LA-1	November 3, 1908	
Six non-consecutive terms
97	Burton L. French	R	ID-al	March 4, 1917	Previously served 1903–09 and 1911–15 while in the House.
98	William B. McKinley	R	IL-19	March 4, 1915	Previously served 1905–13 while in the House.
99	Harry C. Woodyard	R	WV-4	November 7, 1916	Previously served 1903–11 while in the House.
Five consecutive terms
100	Richard W. Austin	R	TN-2	March 4, 1909	Last term while in the House.
101	William P. Borland	D	MO-5	March 4, 1909	Died on February 20, 1919, while still serving in the House.
102	Joseph W. Byrns	D	TN-6	March 4, 1909	
103	J. Campbell Cantrill	D	KY-7	March 4, 1909	Chairman: Industrial Arts and Expositions
104	James W. Collier	D	MS-8	March 4, 1909	
105	Michael F. Conry	D	NY-15	March 4, 1909	Died as Representative-elect March 2, 1917
106	S. Hubert Dent, Jr.	D	AL-2	March 4, 1909	Chairman: Military Affairs
107	Martin Dies	D	TX-2	March 4, 1909	Last term while still serving in the House.
108	Thomas Gallagher	D	IL-8	March 4, 1909	
109	James W. Good	R	IA-5	March 4, 1909	
110	William W. Griest	R	PA-9	March 4, 1909	
111	Irvine L. Lenroot	R	WI-11	March 4, 1909	Resigned to become a US Senator: April 17, 1918
112	Clarence B. Miller	R	MN-8	March 4, 1909	Last term while serving in the House.
113	Dick T. Morgan	R	OK-8	March 4, 1909	
114	William A. Oldfield	D	AR-2	March 4, 1909	
115	Thomas U. Sisson	D	MS-4	March 4, 1909	
116	Edward T. Taylor	D	CO-4	March 4, 1909	Chairman: Irrigation of Arid Lands
117	Robert Y. Thomas, Jr.	D	KY-3	March 4, 1909	
118	Frank P. Woods	R	IA-10	March 4, 1909	Last term while serving in the House.
119	Clement C. Dickinson	D	MO-6	February 1, 1910	
120	H. Garland Dupré	D	LA-2	November 8, 1910	
Five non-consecutive terms
121	Benjamin K. Focht	R	PA-17	March 4, 1915	Previously served 1907–13 while in the House.
122	James McAndrews	D	IL-6	March 4, 1913	Previously served 1901–05 while in the House.
123	Joseph J. Russell	D	MO-14	March 4, 1911	Previously served 1907–09 while in the House. Last term while in the House.
Four consecutive terms
124	Sydney Anderson	R	MN-1	March 4, 1911	
125	Fred L. Blackmon	D	AL-4	March 4, 1911	
126	James F. Byrnes	D	SC-2	March 4, 1911	
127	Ira C. Copley	R	IL-11	March 4, 1911	Progressive 1915–17 while in the House.
128	Frank E. Doremus	D	MI-1	March 4, 1911	
129	Robert L. Doughton	D	NC-8	March 4, 1911	Chairman: Expenditures in the Agriculture Department
130	John R. Farr	R	PA-10	March 4, 1911	Last term while serving in the House until seated during the 66th Congress
131	William J. Fields	D	KY-9	March 4, 1911	
132	William S. Goodwin	D	AR-7	March 4, 1911	
133	Pat Harrison	D	MS-6	March 4, 1911	Last term while serving in the House.
134	Henry T. Helgesen	R	ND-1	March 4, 1911	Died on April 10, 1917, while still serving in the House.
135	Walter L. Hensley	D	MO-13	March 4, 1911	Last term while serving in the House.
136	Edward E. Holland	D	VA-2	March 4, 1911	
137	William S. Howard	D	GA-5	March 4, 1911	Last term while serving in the House.
138	Henderson M. Jacoway	D	AR-5	March 4, 1911	
139	William L. La Follette	R	WA-4	March 4, 1911	Last term while serving in the House.
140	J. Charles Linthicum	D	MD-4	March 4, 1911	
141	Charles O. Lobeck	D	NE-2	March 4, 1911	Chairman: Expenditures in the Treasury Department. Last term while serving in the House.
142	James P. Maher	D	NY-5	March 4, 1911	Chairman: Expenditures in the Labor Department
143	John C. McKenzie	R	IL-13	March 4, 1911	
144	Luther W. Mott	R	NY-32	March 4, 1911	
145	George F. O'Shaunessy	D	RI-1	March 4, 1911	Last term while serving in the House.
146	Stephen G. Porter	R	PA-29	March 4, 1911	
147	Caleb Powers	R	KY-11	March 4, 1911	Last term while serving in the House.
148	John E. Raker	D	CA-2	March 4, 1911	Chairman: Expenditures in the Justice Department; Chairman: Woman Suffrage
149	Edwin E. Roberts	R	NV-al	March 4, 1911	Last term while serving in the House.
150	Arthur B. Rouse	D	KY-6	March 4, 1911	
151	Thomas L. Rubey	D	MO-16	March 4, 1911	
152	Thomas J. Scully	D	NJ-3	March 4, 1911	
153	Sam R. Sells	R	TN-1	March 4, 1911	
154	Charles H. Sloan	R	NE-4	March 4, 1911	Last term while serving in the House until 71st Congress
155	Charles B. Smith	D	NY-41	March 4, 1911	Chairman: Patents. Last term while serving in the House.
156	John M. C. Smith	R	MI-3	March 4, 1911	
157	Charles M. Stedman	D	NC-5	March 4, 1911	
158	Hubert D. Stephens	D	MS-2	March 4, 1911	Chairman: Claims
159	Robert M. Switzer	R	OH-10	March 4, 1911	Last term while serving in the House.
160	Horace M. Towner	R	IA-8	March 4, 1911	
161	Samuel J. Tribble	D	GA-8	March 4, 1911	Died as Representative-elect on December 8, 1916
162	James Young	D	TX-3	March 4, 1911	
163	William R. Green	R	IA-9	June 5, 1911	
164	Leonidas C. Dyer	R	MO-12	March 4, 1915	Previously served 1911-June 19, 1914, while in the House.
165	William J. Browning	R	NJ-1	November 7, 1911	
166	Dan V. Stephens	D	NE-3	November 7, 1911	Last term while serving in the House.
167	Carl T. Hayden	D	AZ-al	February 19, 1912	
168	William S. Vare	R	PA-1	May 24, 1912	
169	Frank L. Greene	R	VT-1	July 30, 1912	
170	Samuel M. Taylor	D	AR-6	January 15, 1913	
Four non-consecutive terms
171	John Q. Tilson	R	CT-3	March 4, 1915	Previously served 1909–13 while in the House.
172	Charles R. Crisp	D	GA-3	March 4, 1913	Previously served December 19, 1896–97 while in the House.
Three consecutive terms
173	James B. Aswell	D	LA-8	March 4, 1913	
174	Alben W. Barkley	D	KY-1	March 4, 1913	
175	Frederick A. Britten	R	IL-9	March 4, 1913	
176	Edward E. Browne	R	WI-8	March 4, 1913	
177	Henry Bruckner	D	NY-22	March 4, 1913	Chairman: Railways and Canals. Resigned December 31, 1917, while still serving in the House.
178	Clement L. Brumbaugh	D	OH-12	March 4, 1913	Chairman: Railways and Canals (1918)
179	Thaddeus H. Caraway	D	AR-1	March 4, 1913	
180	John F. Carew	D	NY-17	March 4, 1913	
181	Walter M. Chandler	R	NY-19	March 4, 1913	Progressive 1913–17 while in the House. Last term while serving in the House until 67th Congress.
182	Denver S. Church	D	CA-7	March 4, 1913	Last term while serving in the House until 73rd Congress
183	John R. Connelly	D	KS-6	March 4, 1913	Last term while serving in the House.
184	Louis C. Cramton	R	MI-7	March 4, 1913	
185	Robert Crosser	D	OH-21	March 4, 1913	Chairman: Expenditures in the Commerce Department. Last term while serving in the House until 68th Congress
186	Charles F. Curry	R	CA-3	March 4, 1913	
187	Harry H. Dale	D	NY-4	March 4, 1913	Resigned on January 6, 1919, while still serving in the House.
188	Perl D. Decker	D	MO-15	March 4, 1913	Last term while serving in the House.
189	Charles H. Dillon	R	SD-1	March 4, 1913	Last term while serving in the House.
190	Peter J. Dooling	D	NY-16	March 4, 1913	Chairman: Expenditures in the War Department
191	Dudley Doolittle	D	KS-4	March 4, 1913	Last term while serving in the House.
192	Thomas B. Dunn	R	NY-38	March 4, 1913	
193	John J. Eagan	D	NJ-11	March 4, 1913	
194	Joe H. Eagle	D	TX-8	March 4, 1913	
195	George W. Edmonds	R	PA-4	March 4, 1913	
196	John M. Evans	D	MT-al	March 4, 1913	
197	Simeon D. Fess	R	OH-7	March 4, 1913	
198	James A. Frear	R	WI-10	March 4, 1913	
199	Warren Gard	D	OH-3	March 4, 1913	
200	William Gordon	D	OH-20	March 4, 1913	Last term while serving in the House.
201	George S. Graham	R	PA-2	March 4, 1913	
202	Daniel J. Griffin	D	NY-8	March 4, 1913	Resigned on December 31, 1917, while still serving in the House.
203	Charles M. Hamilton	R	NY-43	March 4, 1913	Minority Whip. Last term while serving in the House.
204	Guy T. Helvering	D	KS-5	March 4, 1913	Last term while serving in the House.
205	William L. Igoe	D	MO-11	March 4, 1913	
206	Albert Johnson	R	WA-3	March 4, 1913	
207	Edward Keating	D	CO-3	March 4, 1913	Chairman: Expenditures in the Post Office Department. Last term while serving in the House.
208	Patrick H. Kelley	R	MI-6	March 4, 1913	
209	Ambrose Kennedy	R	RI-3	March 4, 1913	
210	William Kettner	D	CA-11	March 4, 1913	
211	John A. Key	D	OH-8	March 4, 1913	Chairman: Pensions. Last term while serving in the House.
212	Edgar R. Kiess	R	PA-15	March 4, 1913	
213	Aaron S. Kreider	R	PA-18	March 4, 1913	
214	Ladislas Lazaro	D	LA-7	March 4, 1913	
215	John V. Lesher	D	PA-16	March 4, 1913	
216	Carl E. Mapes	R	MI-5	March 4, 1913	
217	Andrew J. Montague	D	VA-3	March 4, 1913	
218	John M. Morin	R	PA-31	March 4, 1913	
219	John I. Nolan	R	CA-5	March 4, 1913	
220	Patrick D. Norton	R	ND-3	March 4, 1913	Last term while serving in the House.
221	James S. Parker	R	NY-29	March 4, 1913	
222	Michael F. Phelan	D	MA-7	March 4, 1913	Chairman: Banking and Currency (1918)
223	Edmund Platt	R	NY-26	March 4, 1913	
224	Percy E. Quin	D	MS-7	March 4, 1913	
225	J. Willard Ragsdale	D	SC-6	March 4, 1913	
226	Sam Rayburn	D	TX-4	March 4, 1913	
227	John J. Rogers	R	MA-5	March 4, 1913	
228	Nicholas J. Sinnott	R	OR-2	March 4, 1913	
229	Addison T. Smith	R	ID-al	March 4, 1913	
230	Hatton W. Sumners	D	TX-5	March 4, 1913	
231	Joseph B. Thompson	D	OK-5	March 4, 1913	
232	Allen T. Treadway	R	MA-1	March 4, 1913	
233	John R. Walker	D	GA-11	March 4, 1913	Last term while serving in the House.
234	Walter A. Watson	D	VA-4	March 4, 1913	Chairman: Elections No. 3
235	Otis T. Wingo	D	AR-4	March 4, 1913	
236	Samuel E. Winslow	R	MA-4	March 4, 1913	
237	George M. Young	R	ND-2	March 4, 1913	
238	James P. Buchanan	D	TX-10	April 15, 1913	
239	Richard S. Whaley	D	SC-1	April 29, 1913	
240	John A. Peters	R	ME-3	September 9, 1913	
241	Matthew M. Neely	D	WV-1	October 14, 1913	
242	Charles P. Coady	D	MD-3	November 4, 1913	
243	Calvin D. Paige	R	MA-3	November 4, 1913	
244	Frank Park	D	GA-2	November 4, 1913	Chairman: Accounts
245	Dow H. Drukker	R	NJ-7	April 7, 1914	Last term while serving in the House.
246	James A. Gallivan	D	MA-12	April 7, 1914	
247	Henry W. Temple	R	PA-24	November 2, 1915	Previously served (Progressive) 1913–15 while in the House.
248	Jesse D. Price	D	MD-1	November 3, 1914	Last term while serving in the House.
249	Carl Vinson	D	GA-10	November 3, 1914	
Three non-consecutive terms
250	Elsworth R. Bathrick	D	OH-14	March 4, 1917	Previously served 1911–15. Died on December 23, 1917, while still serving in the House.
251	Horatio C. Claypool	D	OH-11	March 4, 1917	Previously served 1911–15 while in the House. Last term while serving in the House.
252	Thomas S. Crago	R	PA-al	March 4, 1915	Previously served 1911–13 while in the House.
253	David Hollingsworth	R	OH-18	March 4, 1915	Previously served 1909–11 while in the House. Last term while serving in the House.
254	Adam B. Littlepage	D	WV-6	March 4, 1915	Previously served 1911–13 while in the House. Last term while serving in the House.
255	William E. Mason	R	IL-al	March 4, 1917	Previously served 1887–91 while in the House.
256	Ashton C. Shallenberger	D	NE-5	March 4, 1915	Previously served 1901–03 while in the House. Last term while serving in the House until 68th Congress.
257	John S. Snook	D	OH-5	March 4, 1917	Previously served 1901–05 while in the House. Last term while serving in the House.
258	George White	D	OH-15	March 4, 1917	Previously served 1911–15 while in the House. Last term while serving in the House.
259	George C. Scott	R	IA-11	March 4, 1917	Previously served November 5, 1912–15 while in the House. Last term while serving in the House.
Two consecutive terms
260	Edward B. Almon	D	AL-8	March 4, 1915	
261	William A. Ayres	D	KS-8	March 4, 1915	
262	Isaac Bacharach	R	NJ-2	March 4, 1915	
263	Eugene Black	D	TX-1	March 4, 1915	
264	C. Pope Caldwell	D	NY-2	March 4, 1915	
265	John H. Capstick	R	NJ-5	March 4, 1915	Died on March 17, 1918, while still serving in the House.
266	William H. Carter	R	MA-13	March 4, 1915	Last term while serving in the House.
267	Edward Cooper	R	WV-5	March 4, 1915	Last term while serving in the House.
268	John G. Cooper	R	OH-19	March 4, 1915	
269	Peter E. Costello	R	PA-5	March 4, 1915	
270	Porter H. Dale	R	VT-2	March 4, 1915	
271	Frederick W. Dallinger	R	MA-8	March 4, 1915	
272	George P. Darrow	R	PA-6	March 4, 1915	
273	S. Wallace Dempsey	R	NY-40	March 4, 1915	
274	Edward E. Denison	R	IL-25	March 4, 1915	
275	Arthur G. Dewalt	D	PA-13	March 4, 1915	
276	Clarence C. Dill	D	WA-5	March 4, 1915	Last term while serving in the House.
277	Cassius C. Dowell	R	IA-7	March 4, 1915	
278	Franklin Ellsworth	R	MN-2	March 4, 1915	
279	John A. Elston	Prog	CA-6	March 4, 1915	Republican and Progressive candidate: 1916 election
280	Henry I. Emerson	R	OH-22	March 4, 1915	
281	Joseph V. Flynn	D	NY-3	March 4, 1915	Last term while serving in the House.
282	Richard P. Freeman	R	CT-2	March 4, 1915	
283	Harry L. Gandy	D	SD-3	March 4, 1915	
284	Mahlon M. Garland	R	PA-al	March 4, 1915	
285	James P. Glynn	R	CT-5	March 4, 1915	
286	Edward W. Gray	R	NJ-8	March 4, 1915	Last term while serving in the House.
287	Oscar L. Gray	D	AL-1	March 4, 1915	Last term while serving in the House.
288	Lindley H. Hadley	R	WA-2	March 4, 1915	
289	Reuben L. Haskell	R	NY-10	March 4, 1915	
290	William W. Hastings	D	OK-2	March 4, 1915	Chairman: Expenditures in the Interior Department
291	Robert D. Heaton	R	PA-12	March 4, 1915	Last term while serving in the House.
292	Frederick C. Hicks	R	NY-1	March 4, 1915	
293	Benjamin Hilliard	D	CO-1	March 4, 1915	Last term while serving in the House.
294	George E. Hood	D	NC-3	March 4, 1915	Last term while serving in the House.
295	George Huddleston	D	AL-9	March 4, 1915	
296	G. Murray Hulbert	D	NY-21	March 4, 1915	Resigned on January 1, 1918, while still serving in the House.
297	Harry E. Hull	R	IA-2	March 4, 1915	
298	James W. Husted	R	NY-25	March 4, 1915	
299	Elijah C. Hutchinson	R	NJ-4	March 4, 1915	
300	W. Frank James	R	MI-12	March 4, 1915	
301	Royal C. Johnson	R	SD-2	March 4, 1915	
302	Charles C. Kearns	R	OH-6	March 4, 1915	
303	David H. Kincheloe	D	KY-2	March 4, 1915	
304	Edward J. King	R	IL-15	March 4, 1915	
305	Frederick R. Lehlbach	R	NJ-10	March 4, 1915	
306	Meyer London	Soc	NY-12	March 4, 1915	Socialist. Last term while serving in the House until 67th Congress
307	Walter W. Magee	R	NY-35	March 4, 1915	
308	Whitmell P. Martin	Prog	LA-3	March 4, 1915	
309	James H. Mays	D	UT-2	March 4, 1915	
310	Clifton N. McArthur	R	OR-3	March 4, 1915	
311	James V. McClintic	D	OK-7	March 4, 1915	Chairman: Expenditures on Public Buildings
312	Roscoe C. McCulloch	R	OH-16	March 4, 1915	
313	Louis T. McFadden	R	PA-14	March 4, 1915	
314	A. Jeff McLemore	D	TX-al	March 4, 1915	Last term while serving in the House.
315	Jacob E. Meeker	R	MO-10	March 4, 1915	Died on October 16, 1918, while still serving in the House.
316	Merrill Moores	R	IN-7	March 4, 1915	
317	Sydney E. Mudd II	R	MD-5	March 4, 1915	
318	Charles A. Nichols	R	MI-13	March 4, 1915	
319	William B. Oliver	D	AL-6	March 4, 1915	
320	Richard Olney II	D	MA-14	March 4, 1915	
321	Arthur W. Overmyer	D	OH-13	March 4, 1915	Last term while serving in the House.
322	Harry H. Pratt	R	NY-37	March 4, 1915	Last term while serving in the House.
323	C. William Ramseyer	R	IA-6	March 4, 1915	
324	Charles H. Randall	Proh	CA-9	March 4, 1915	Prohibition
325	C. Frank Reavis	R	NE-1	March 4, 1915	
326	Frederick W. Rowe	R	NY-6	March 4, 1915	
327	Charles H. Rowland	R	PA-21	March 4, 1915	Last term while serving in the House.
328	Rollin B. Sanford	R	NY-28	March 4, 1915	
329	Thomas D. Schall	R	MN-10	March 4, 1915	
330	Frank D. Scott	R	MI-11	March 4, 1915	
331	John R. K. Scott	R	PA-al	March 4, 1915	Resigned on January 5, 1919, while still serving in the House.
332	William J. Sears	D	FL-4	March 4, 1915	Chairman: Education
333	Jouett Shouse	D	KS-7	March 4, 1915	Last term while serving in the House.
334	Isaac Siegel	R	NY-20	March 4, 1915	
335	Homer P. Snyder	R	NY-33	March 4, 1915	
336	Henry B. Steagall	D	AL-3	March 4, 1915	
337	Henry J. Steele	D	PA-26	March 4, 1915	
338	Walter R. Stiness	R	RI-2	March 4, 1915	
339	Burton E. Sweet	R	IA-3	March 4, 1915	
340	Oscar W. Swift	R	NY-9	March 4, 1915	Last term while serving in the House.
341	Peter F. Tague	D	MA-10	March 4, 1915	Last term while serving in the House until seated in 66th Congress
342	John N. Tillman	D	AR-3	March 4, 1915	
343	Charles B. Timberlake	R	CO-2	March 4, 1915	
344	George H. Tinkham	R	MA-11	March 4, 1915	
345	Carl Van Dyke	D	MN-4	March 4, 1915	
346	Joseph Walsh	R	MA-16	March 4, 1915	
347	Charles B. Ward	R	NY-27	March 4, 1915	
348	Edward H. Wason	R	NH-2	March 4, 1915	
349	Henry W. Watson	R	PA-8	March 4, 1915	
350	Loren E. Wheeler	R	IL-21	March 4, 1915	
351	Thomas S. Williams	R	IL-24	March 4, 1915	
352	Riley J. Wilson	D	LA-5	March 4, 1915	Chairman: Elections No. 1
353	James W. Wise	D	GA-6	March 4, 1915	
354	William R. Wood	R	IN-10	March 4, 1915	
355	Samuel J. Nicholls	D	SC-4	September 14, 1915	
356	Norman J. Gould	R	NY-36	November 2, 1915	
357	Bertrand H. Snell	R	NY-31	November 2, 1915	
358	William W. Venable	D	MS-5	January 4, 1916	
359	George M. Bowers	R	WV-2	May 9, 1916	
360	Thomas W. Harrison	D	VA-7	November 7, 1916	
Two non-consecutive terms
361	Andrew R. Brodbeck	D	PA-20	March 4, 1917	Previously served 1913–15 while in the House. Last term while serving in the House.
362	Benjamin L. Fairchild	R	NY-24	March 4, 1917	Previously served 1895–97 while in the House. Last term while serving in the House until 67th Congress.
363	Daniel E. Garrett	D	TX-al	March 4, 1917	Previously served 1913–15 while in the House. Last term while serving in the House until 67th Congress.
364	M. Clyde Kelly	Prog	PA-30	March 4, 1917	Previously served (Republican) 1913–15 while in the House.
365	Augustine Lonergan	D	CT-1	March 4, 1917	Previously served 1913–15 while in the House.
366	Edward E. Robbins	R	PA-22	March 4, 1917	Previously served 1897–99 while in the House. Died January 25, 1919, while still serving in the House.
367	James W. Overstreet	D	GA-1	March 4, 1917	Previously served October 3, 1906–07 while in the House.
One term
368	Mark R. Bacon	R	MI-2	March 4, 1917	Unseated after recount: December 13, 1917
369	William B. Bankhead	D	AL-10	March 4, 1917	
370	Oscar E. Bland	R	IN-2	March 4, 1917	
371	Thomas L. Blanton	D	TX-16	March 4, 1917	
372	Orrin D. Bleakley	R	PA-28	March 4, 1917	Resigned as Representative-elect April 3, 1917 (never qualified)
...	Charles H. Brand	D	GA-8	March 4, 1917	Special election January 11, 1917 (before start of the term)
373	Guy E. Campbell	D	PA-32	March 4, 1917	
374	Thomas A. Chandler	R	OK-1	March 4, 1917	Only term while serving in the House until 67th Congress
375	Henry A. Clark	R	PA-25	March 4, 1917	Only term while serving in the House.
376	David G. Classon	R	WI-9	March 4, 1917	
377	Daniel W. Comstock	R	IN-6	March 4, 1917	Died on May 19, 1917, while still serving in the House.
378	Tom T. Connally	D	TX-11	March 4, 1917	
379	Gilbert A. Currie	R	MI-10	March 4, 1917	
380	George K. Denton	D	IN-1	March 4, 1917	Only term while serving in the House.
381	Frederick H. Dominick	D	SC-3	March 4, 1917	
382	Herbert J. Drane	D	FL-1	March 4, 1917	
383	Louis W. Fairfield	R	IN-12	March 4, 1917	
384	Hubert F. Fisher	D	TN-10	March 4, 1917	
385	George B. Francis	R	NY-18	March 4, 1917	Only term while serving in the House.
386	Alvan T. Fuller	Ind R	MA-9	March 4, 1917	Independent Republican
387	Louis B. Goodall	R	ME-1	March 4, 1917	
388	William J. Graham	R	IL-14	March 4, 1917	
389	Victor Heintz	R	OH-2	March 4, 1917	Only term while serving in the House.
390	Ira G. Hersey	R	ME-4	March 4, 1917	
391	Clifford C. Ireland	R	IL-16	March 4, 1917	
392	John M. Jones	D	TX-13	March 4, 1917	
393	Niels Juul	R	IL-7	March 4, 1917	
394	J. Walter Kehoe	D	FL-3	March 4, 1917	Only term while serving in the House.
395	Harold Knutson	R	MN-6	March 4, 1917	
396	Milton Kraus	R	IN-11	March 4, 1917	
397	Fiorello H. La Guardia	R	NY-14	March 4, 1917	
398	William W. Larsen	D	GA-12	March 4, 1917	
399	Clarence F. Lea	D	CA-1	March 4, 1917	
400	Edward C. Little	R	KS-2	March 4, 1917	
401	Ernest Lundeen	R	MN-5	March 4, 1917	Only term while serving in the House until 73rd Congress
402	George R. Lunn	D	NY-30	March 4, 1917	Only term while serving in the House.
403	Joseph J. Mansfield	D	TX-9	March 4, 1917	
404	Charles Martin	D	IL-4	March 4, 1917	Died on October 28, 1917, while still serving in the House.
405	J. Medill McCormick	R	IL-al	March 4, 1917	Only term while serving in the House.
406	Thomas D. McKeown	D	OK-4	March 4, 1917	
407	Joseph McLaughlin	R	PA-al	March 4, 1917	Only term while serving in the House until 67th Congress
408	John F. Miller	R	WA-1	March 4, 1917	
409	Daniel C. Oliver	D	NY-23	March 4, 1917	Only term while serving in the House.
410	Henry Z. Osborne	R	CA-10	March 4, 1917	
411	Albert F. Polk	D	DE-al	March 4, 1917	Only term while serving in the House.
412	Fred S. Purnell	R	IN-9	March 4, 1917	
413	John R. Ramsey	R	NJ-6	March 4, 1917	
414	Jeannette Rankin	R	MT-al	March 4, 1917	Only term while serving in the House until 77th Congress. First female Representative.
415	Stuart F. Reed	R	WV-3	March 4, 1917	
416	Leonidas D. Robinson	D	NC-7	March 4, 1917	
417	Milton A. Romjue	D	MO-1	March 4, 1917	
418	John M. Rose	R	PA-19	March 4, 1917	
419	Archie D. Sanders	R	NY-39	March 4, 1917	
420	Everett Sanders	R	IN-5	March 4, 1917	
421	Jared Y. Sanders, Sr.	D	LA-6	March 4, 1917	
422	Bruce F. Sterling	D	PA-23	March 4, 1917	Only term while serving in the House.
...	William F. Stevenson	D	SC-5	March 4, 1917	Special election February 21, 1917 (before start of the term)
423	Nathan L. Strong	R	PA-27	March 4, 1917	
424	Christopher D. Sullivan	D	NY-13	March 4, 1917	Chairman: Expenditures in the Labor Department
425	Thomas W. Templeton	R	PA-11	March 4, 1917	Only term while serving in the House.
426	Albert H. Vestal	R	IN-8	March 4, 1917	
427	Edward Voigt	R	WI-2	March 4, 1917	
428	William F. Waldow	R	NY-42	March 4, 1917	Only term while serving in the House.
429	William B. Walton	D	NM-al	March 4, 1917	Only term while serving in the House.
430	Zebulon Weaver	D	NC-10	March 4, 1917	Unseated after election contest: March 1, 1919
431	Milton H. Welling	D	UT-1	March 4, 1917	
432	Benjamin F. Welty	D	OH-4	March 4, 1917	
433	Wallace H. White, Jr.	R	ME-2	March 4, 1917	
434	James C. Wilson	D	TX-12	March 4, 1917	Resigned to become US District Judge: March 3, 1919
435	Frederick N. Zihlman	R	MD-6	March 4, 1917	
Members joining the House, after the start of the Congress
...	Thomas F. Smith	D	NY-15	April 12, 1917	Special election
...	Sherman E. Burroughs	R	NH-1	May 29, 1917	Special election
...	Richard N. Elliott	R	IN-6	June 29, 1917	Special election
...	John M. Baer	R	ND-1	August 10, 1917	Special election
...	Earl H. Beshlin	R	PA-28	November 6, 1917	Special election. Only term while serving in the House.
...	Willfred W. Lufkin	R	MA-6	November 6, 1917	Special election
...	Schuyler Merritt	R	CT-4	November 6, 1917	Special election
...	Samuel W. Beakes	R	MI-2	December 13, 1917	Previously served 1913–17 while in the House. Seated after recount. Last term while serving in the House.
...	William C. Wright	D	GA-4	January 16, 1918	Special election
...	William E. Cleary	D	NY-8	March 5, 1918	Special election
...	John J. Delaney	D	NY-7	March 5, 1918	Special election. Only term while serving in the House.
...	Jerome F. Donovan	D	NY-21	March 5, 1918	Special election
...	Anthony J. Griffin	D	NY-22	March 5, 1918	Special election
...	John W. Rainey	D	IL-4	April 2, 1918	Special election
...	S. Otis Bland	D	VA-1	July 2, 1918	Special election
...	Carville D. Benson	D	MD-2	November 5, 1918	Special election
...	William F. Birch	R	NJ-5	November 5, 1918	Special election. Only term while serving in the House.
...	Martin L. Davey	D	OH-14	November 5, 1918	Special election
...	Frederick Essen	D	MO-10	November 5, 1918	Special election. Only term while serving in the House.
...	Florian Lampert	R	WI-6	November 5, 1918	Special election
...	Adolphus P. Nelson	R	WI-11	November 5, 1918	Special election
...	James P. Woods	D	VA-6	February 25, 1919	Special election
...	James J. Britt	R	NC-10	March 1, 1919	Previously served 1915–17 while in the House. Seated after election contest. Last term while serving in the House.
Non voting members
a	Jonah K. Kalaniana'ole	R	HI-al	March 4, 1903	Territorial Delegate
b	Jaime C. De Veyra	N	PI-al	March 4, 1917	Resident Commissioner. Nationalist Party (PI).
c	Charles A. Sulzer	D	AK-al	March 4, 1917	Territorial Delegate. Unseated after election contest: January 7, 1919. Last term while serving in the House until 66th Congress.
d	Teodoro R. Yangco	N	PI-al	March 4, 1917	Resident Commissioner. Nationalist Party (PI).
e	Félix Córdova Dávila	U	PR-al	August 7, 1917	Resident Commissioner. Unionist Party (PR).
f	James Wickersham	R	AK-al	January 7, 1919	Territorial Delegate. Previously served 1909–17 while in the House. Seated after election contest. Last term until 66th Congress.

== See also ==
- 65th United States Congress
- List of United States congressional districts
- List of United States senators in the 65th Congress
