= Richard Bartholdt =

American politician (1855–1932)

Hon. Richard Bartholdt
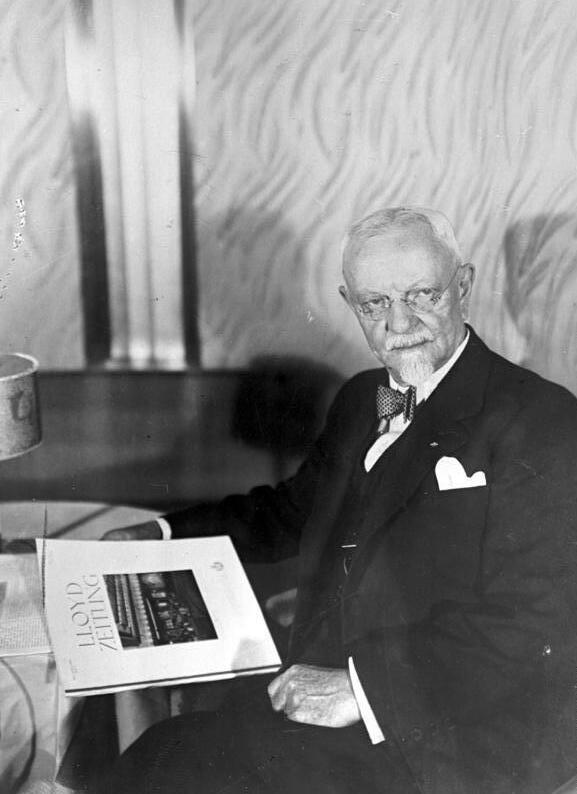

Member of the U.S. House of Representatives from Missouri's 10th district
- In office March 4, 1893 – March 3, 1915
- Preceded by: Samuel Byrns
- Succeeded by: Jacob E. Meeker

Personal details
- Born: November 2, 1855 Schleiz, Principality of Reuss Junior Line
- Died: March 19, 1932 (aged 76) St. Louis, Missouri
- Party: Republican

Richard Bartholdt (November 2, 1855 – March 19, 1932) was a U.S. Representative from Missouri.

Born in Schleiz, Principality of Reuss-Geray, Bartholdt attended the public schools and Schleiz College (Gymnasium). He emigrated to the United States in April 1872 and settled in Brooklyn, New York.

He learned the printing trade and became a newspaper writer and publisher. He moved to Missouri and settled in St. Louis in 1877. He was connected with several papers as a reporter, legislative correspondent, and editor, and at the time of his election to Congress was editor in chief of the St. Louis Tribune. He served as member of the St. Louis Board of Education from 1888 to 1892, serving as president from 1890 to 1892.

Bartholdt was elected as a Republican to the Fifty-third and to the ten succeeding Congresses (March 4, 1893 – March 3, 1915). He served as chairman of the Committee on Immigration and Naturalization (Fifty-fourth Congress), Committee on Levees and Improvements of the Mississippi River (Fifty-fifth through Fifty-eighth Congresses), Committee on Public Buildings and Grounds (Fifty-ninth through Sixty-first Congresses). In 1911 he was appointed by President Taft as a special envoy to the German Emperor to present a statue of Baron von Steuben as a gift from Congress and the American people. He was not a candidate for renomination in 1914.

He served as chairman of the Republican State convention at St. Joseph, Missouri, in 1896. Bartholdt was elected president of the Interparliamentary Union at the conference held in St. Louis in 1904, wherein the following year he proposed "the most interesting recent suggestion for federating nations into a League of Peace". He also founded the arbitration group in Congress in 1903, and was its president for many years.

Bartholdt was an Esperantist, and in 1914 he proposed a resolution to have Esperanto taught in American schools. During World War I, he was president of the American Independence Union, which campaigned for an embargo on munitions sales by United States companies to belligerent countries. He wrote an autobiography entitled From Steerage to Congress (Philadelphia: Dorrance, 1930).

He died in St. Louis, Missouri, on March 19, 1932. His body was cremated and the ashes interred in Concordia Cemetery.

U.S. House of Representatives
Preceded by Samuel Byrns	Member of the U.S. House of Representatives from Missouri's 10th congressional district 1893–1915	Succeeded by Jacob E. Meeker
