= Concordia Cemetery =

Concordia Cemetery may refer to:

- Concordia Cemetery (Buffalo, New York)
- Concordia Cemetery (El Paso, Texas)
