= List of United States senators in the 65th Congress =

This is a complete list of United States senators during the 65th United States Congress listed by seniority from March 4, 1917, to March 3, 1919.

Order of service is based on the commencement of the senator's first term. Behind this is former service as a senator (only giving the senator seniority within their new incoming class), service as vice president, a House member, a cabinet secretary, or a governor of a state. The final factor is the population of the senator's state.

Senators who were sworn in during the middle of the Congress (up until the last senator who was not sworn in early after winning the November 1918 election) are listed at the end of the list with no number.

== Terms of service ==
Class	Terms of service of senators that expired in years
Class 2	Terms of service of senators that expired in 1919 (AL, AR, CO, DE, GA, IA, ID, IL, KS, KY, LA, MA, ME, MI, MN, MS, MT, NC, NE, NH, NJ, NM, OK, OR, RI, SC, SD, TN, TX, VA, WV, and WY.)
Class 3	Terms of service of senators that expired in 1921 (AL, AR, AZ, CA, CO, CT, FL, GA, ID, IL, IN, IA, KS, KY, LA, MD, MO, NC, ND, NH, NV, NY, OH, OK, OR, PA, SC, SD, UT, VT, WA, and WI.)
Class 1	Terms of service of senators that expired in 1923 (AZ, CA, CT, DE, FL, IN, MA, MD, ME, MI, MN, MO, MS, MT, ND, NE, NJ, NM, NV, NY, OH, PA, RI, TN, TX, UT, VA, VT, WA, WI, WV, and WY.)

== U.S. Senate seniority list ==
U.S. Senate seniority
Rank	Senator (party-state)	Seniority date	Other factors
1	Jacob H. Gallinger (R-NH)	March 4, 1891	
2	Henry Cabot Lodge (R-MA)	March 4, 1893	
3	Francis E. Warren (R-WY)	March 4, 1895	Previously a senator
4	Knute Nelson (R-MN)	March 4, 1895	Former governor, Minnesota 20th in population (1890)
5	Benjamin Tillman (D-SC)	March 4, 1895	Former governor, South Carolina 23rd in population (1890)
6	Thomas S. Martin (D-VA)	March 4, 1895	
7	Boies Penrose (R-PA)	March 4, 1897	
8	Charles A. Culberson (D-TX)	March 4, 1899	Former governor
9	Porter McCumber (R-ND)	March 4, 1899	
10	William P. Dillingham (R-VT)	October 18, 1900	
11	Furnifold M. Simmons (D-NC)	March 4, 1901	
12	Francis Newlands (D-NV)	March 4, 1903	Former representative
13	William J. Stone (D-MO)	March 4, 1903	Former governor
14	Lee S. Overman (D-NC)	March 4, 1903	North Carolina 15th in population (1900)
15	Reed Smoot (R-UT)	March 4, 1903	Utah 41st in population (1900)
16	Frank B. Brandegee (R-CT)	May 10, 1905	
17	Robert M. La Follette, Sr. (R-WI)	January 4, 1906	
18	William A. Smith (R-MI)	February 9, 1907	
19	William Borah (R-ID)	March 4, 1907	
20	John H. Bankhead (D-AL)	June 18, 1907	
21	Thomas Gore (D-OK)	December 11, 1907	"G" 7th in alphabet
22	Robert Owen (D-OK)	December 11, 1907	"O" 15th in alphabet
23	John Walter Smith (D-MD)	March 25, 1908	
24	Carroll S. Page (R-VT)	October 21, 1908	
25	Albert B. Cummins (R-IA)	November 24, 1908	
26	Wesley Jones (R-WA)	March 4, 1909	Former representative
27	Ellison D. Smith (D-SC)	March 4, 1909	South Carolina 24th in population (1900)
28	Duncan U. Fletcher (D-FL)	March 4, 1909	Florida 33rd in population (1900)
29	George Chamberlain (D-OR)	March 4, 1909	Oregon 36th in population (1900)
30	Claude A. Swanson (D-VA)	August 1, 1910	
31	Asle Gronna (R-ND)	February 2, 1911	
32	John S. Williams (D-MS)	March 4, 1911	Former representative (16 years)
33	Charles Townsend (R-MI)	March 4, 1911	Former representative (8 years)
34	Gilbert Hitchcock (D-NE)	March 4, 1911	Former representative (6 years)
35	Miles Poindexter (R-WA)	March 4, 1911	Former representative (2 years)
36	George P. McLean (R-CT)	March 4, 1911	Former governor
37	Atlee Pomerene (D-OH)	March 4, 1911	Ohio 4th in population (1910)
38	James A. Reed (D-MO)	March 4, 1911	Missouri 7th in population (1910)
39	Henry L. Myers (D-MT)	March 4, 1911	Montana 40th in population (1910)
40	William S. Kenyon (R-IA)	April 12, 1911	
41	Hoke Smith (D-GA)	November 16, 1911	
42	Marcus A. Smith (D-AZ)	April 2, 1912	Former delegate
43	Albert B. Fall (R-NM)	April 2, 1912	New Mexico 43rd in population (1910)
44	Henry F. Ashurst (D-AZ)	April 2, 1912	Arizona 45th in population (1910)
45	Charles Thomas (D-CO)	January 15, 1913	
46	James Brady (R-ID)	January 24, 1913	
47	Key Pittman (D-NV)	January 29, 1913	
48	Morris Sheppard (D-TX)	February 3, 1913	
49	Joseph E. Ransdell (D-LA)	March 4, 1913	Former representative (14 years)
50	Joseph Robinson (R-AR)	March 4, 1913	Former representative (10 years), former governor
51	Ollie James (R-KY)	March 4, 1913	Former representative (10 years), Kentucky 14th in population (1910)
52	George W. Norris (R-NE)	March 4, 1913	Former representative (10 years), Nebraska 29th in population (1910)
53	John F. Shafroth (D-CO)	March 4, 1913	Former representative (9 years), former governor
54	William Hughes (D-NJ)	March 4, 1913	Former representative (9 years)
55	John W. Weeks (R-MA)	March 4, 1913	Former representative (8 years)
56	Nathan Goff, Jr. (R-WV)	March 4, 1913	Former representative (6 years), former cabinet member
57	James K. Vardaman (D-MS)	March 4, 1913	Former governor
58	John Shields (D-TN)	March 4, 1913	Tennessee 17th in population (1910)
59	William H. Thompson (D-KS)	March 4, 1913	Kansas 22nd in population (1910)
60	Harry Lane (D-OR)	March 4, 1913	Oregon 35th in population (1910)
61	Thomas Sterling (R-SD)	March 4, 1913	South Dakota 36th in population (1910)
62	LeBaron Colt (R-RI)	March 4, 1913	Rhode Island 38th in population (1910)
63	Thomas J. Walsh (D-MT)	March 4, 1913	Montana 40th in population (1910)
64	Willard Saulsbury, Jr. (D-DE)	March 4, 1913	Delaware 46th in population (1910)
65	Henry F. Hollis (D-NH)	March 13, 1913	
66	J. Hamilton Lewis (D-IL)	March 26, 1913	
67	Lawrence Sherman (R-IL)	March 26, 1913	
68	Thomas W. Hardwick (D-GA)	November 4, 1914	
69	Charles Curtis (R-KS)	March 4, 1915	Previously a senator
70	Oscar Underwood (D-AL)	March 4, 1915	Former representative (19 years)
71	Robert F. Broussard (D-LA)	March 4, 1915	Former representative (18 years)
72	John C. W. Beckham (D-KY)	March 4, 1915	Former governor
73	James Wadsworth, Jr. (R-NY)	March 4, 1915	New York 1st in population (1910)
74	Warren G. Harding (R-OH)	March 4, 1915	Ohio 4th in population (1910)
75	James D. Phelan (D-CA)	March 4, 1915	California 12th in population (1910)
76	Paul Husting (D-WI)	March 4, 1915	Wiscontin 13th in population (1910)
77	Edwin S. Johnson (D-SD)	March 4, 1915	South Dakota 36th in population (1910)
78	Bert Fernald (R-ME)	September 12, 1916	
79	James Watson (R-IN)	November 8, 1916	Former representative
80	William F. Kirby (D-AR)	November 8, 1916	
81	Philander C. Knox (R-PA)	March 4, 1917	Previously a senator
82	William M. Calder (R-NY)	March 4, 1917	Former representative (10 years)
83	Kenneth McKellar (D-TN)	March 4, 1917	Former representative (6 years)
84	Howard Sutherland (R-WV)	March 4, 1917	Former representative (4 years)
85	William H. King (D-UT)	March 4, 1917	Former representative (3 years)
86	Peter G. Gerry (D-RI)	March 4, 1917	Former representative (2 years)
87	Park Trammell (D-FL)	March 4, 1917	Former governor, Florida 33rd in population (1910)
88	John B. Kendrick (D-WY)	March 4, 1917	Former governor, Wyoming 47th in population (1910)
89	Harry S. New (R-IN)	March 4, 1917	Indiana 9th in population (1910)
90	Joseph S. Frelinghuysen (R-NJ)	March 4, 1917	New Jersey 11th in population (1910)
91	Frank B. Kellogg (R-MN)	March 4, 1917	Minnesota 19th in population (1910)
92	Joseph I. France (R-MD)	March 4, 1917	Maryland 27th in population (1910)
93	Frederick Hale (R-ME)	March 4, 1917	Maine 34th in population (1910)
94	Andrieus Jones (R-NM)	March 4, 1917	New Mexico 43rd in population (1910)
95	Josiah Wolcott (D-DE)	March 4, 1917	Delaware 46th in population (1910)
96	Hiram Johnson (R-CA)	March 16, 1917	
	Charles L. McNary (R-OR)	May 29, 1917	
	Charles Henderson (D-NV)	January 12, 1918	
	John F. Nugent (D-ID)	January 22, 1918	
	David Baird (R-NJ)	February 23, 1918	
	Irvine Lenroot (R-WI)	April 18, 1918	
	Walter Guion (D-LA)	April 22, 1918	
	Xenophon P. Wilfley (D-MO)	April 30, 1918	
	Christie Benet (D-SC)	July 6, 1918	
	Irving Drew (R-NH)	September 2, 1918	
	George B. Martin (R-KY)	September 7, 1918	
	Frederick Mulkey (R-OR)	November 6, 1918	Former senator
	Selden P. Spencer (R-MO)	November 6, 1918	Missouri 7th in population (1910)
	Edward J. Gay (R-LA)	November 6, 1918	Louisiana 24th in population (1910)
	William P. Pollock (D-SC)	November 6, 1918	South Carolina 26th in population (1910)
	George H. Moses (R-NH)	November 6, 1918	New Hampshire 39th in population (1910)
	Charles L. McNary (R-OR)	December 18, 1918	

== See also ==
- 65th United States Congress
- List of United States representatives in the 65th Congress
