= Daniel Kinsey =

American hurdler (1902–1970)

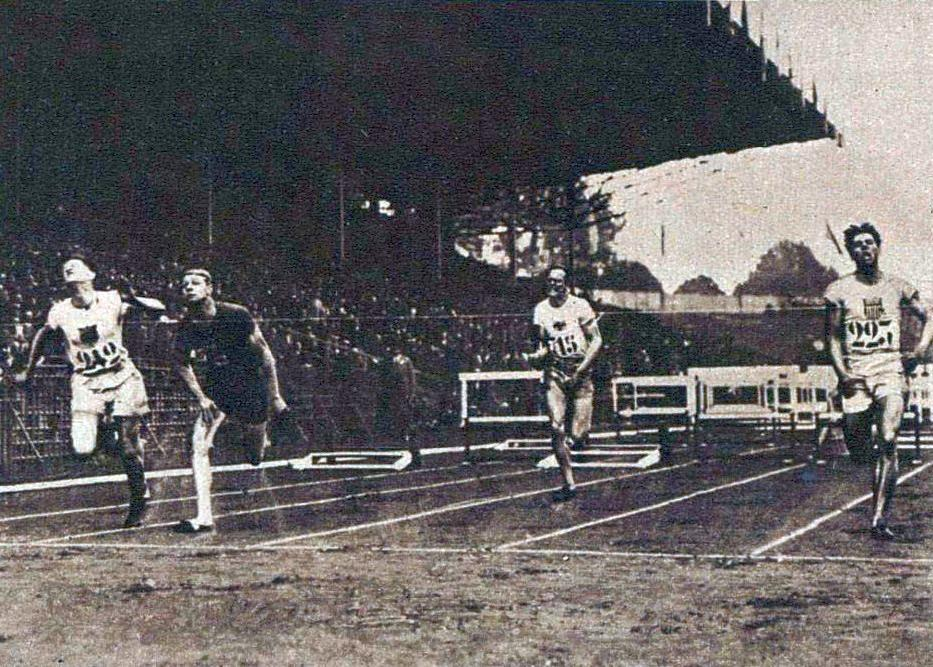
- Kinsey winning the 110-meter hurdle ahead of Sid Atkinson, at the 1924 Olympics.

Personal information
- Full name: Daniel Chapin Kinsey
- Born: January 22, 1902 St. Louis, Missouri, U.S.
- Died: June 27, 1970 (aged 68) Richmond, Indiana, U.S.
- Relative: William M. Kinsey (grandfather)
Medal record
Men's athletics
Representing the United States
Olympic Games
Gold medal – first place	1924 Paris	110 m hurdles

Daniel Chapin Kinsey (January 22, 1902 – June 27, 1970) was an American hurdler and scholar in physical education.

Born in St. Louis, Kinsey attended the University of Illinois, studying education. He won the gold medal in the 110-Metres Hurdles at the 1924 Summer Olympics in Paris.

He graduated in 1926 and continued his study in physical education at Oberlin College, where he would also work until 1959. Besides teaching, Kinsey was involved in coaching several school teams and was on the board of several committees and associations, such as the American Olympians Association.

In 1959, Kinsey left Oberlin and became a professor at Earlham College and at Delta College, University Center, MI. He retired in 1967 and continued living in Richmond, Indiana. He died on vacation, visiting family, aged 68, soon after he retired.

Kinsey's grandfather was politician William M. Kinsey.
