= Samuel Byrns =

American lawyer and politician (1848–1914)

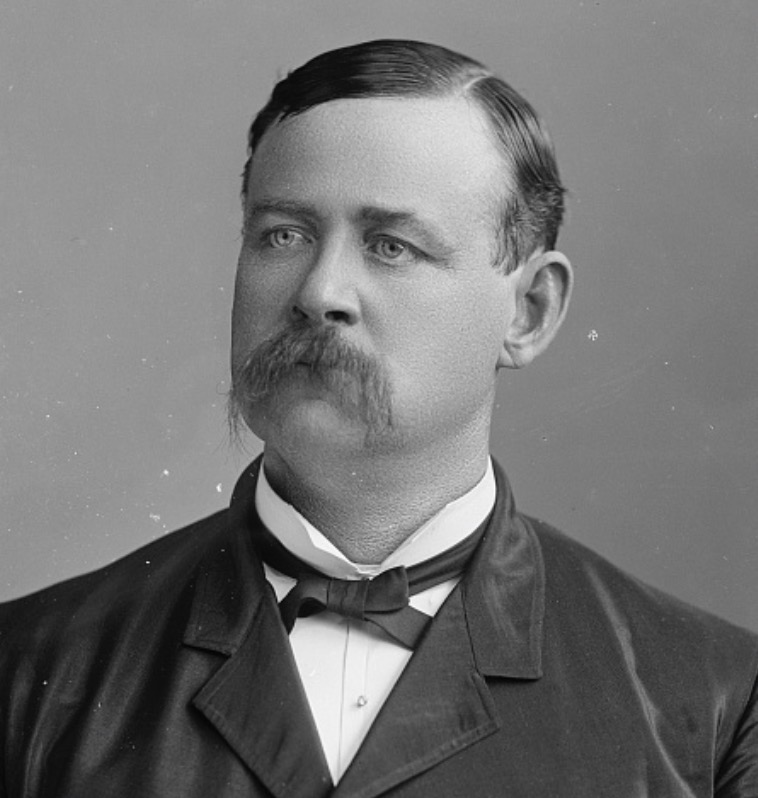
- Portrait of Byrns by Charles Milton Bell, between January 1891 and January 1894

Member of the U.S. House of Representatives from Missouri's 10th district
- In office March 4, 1891 – March 3, 1893
- Preceded by: William M. Kinsey
- Succeeded by: Richard Bartholdt

Member of the Missouri House of Representatives from the Jefferson County district
- In office 1876–1877

Member of the Missouri Senate from the 10th district district
- In office 1878

Personal details
- Born: March 4, 1848 near House Springs, Missouri, US
- Died: July 9, 1914 (aged 66) De Soto, Missouri, US
- Party: Democratic
- Occupation: Lawyer, politician

Samuel Byrns (erroneously Burns; March 4, 1848 – July 9, 1914) was an American lawyer and politician. A Democrat, he was a member of the United States House of Representatives from Missouri.

== Biography ==
Byrns was born on March 4, 1848, near House Springs, Missouri, the son of Thomas Byrns and Margaret (née Bowles) Byrns. During the American Civil War, he served in the Confederate States Army. He studied law and was admitted to the bar in 1872, after which he commenced practice in Hillsboro.

A Democrat, Byrns was the Jefferson County Collector of Revenue in 1872. From 1876 to 1877, he represented Jefferson County in the Missouri House of Representatives, and in 1878, a represented the 10th district in the Missouri Senate. He was a member of the Missouri Central Democratic Committee from 1886 to 1888. He was a member of the United States House of Representatives from March 4, 1891, to March 3, 1893, representing Missouri's 3rd district. He lost his re-election.

After serving in Congress, Byrns resumed practicing law, now in De Soto, Missouri. He was married to Lizzie Moss. He died on July 4, 1914, aged 66, in De Soto; his death was caused by a paralyzing stroke, which he suffered minutes after being told of the death of friend and politician Martin L. Clardy. He was buried on 11 July, at Hillsboro Cemetery.

U.S. House of Representatives
Preceded by William M. Kinsey	Member of the U.S. House of Representatives from Missouri's 10th congressional district 1891–1893	Succeeded by Richard Bartholdt
