= Frederick Essen =

American politician (1863–1946)

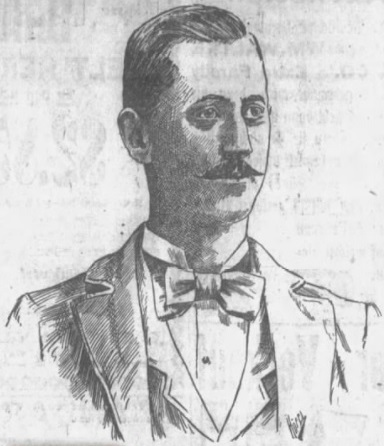
- Mississippi Blätter (St. Louis, Missouri), February 16, 1896

Member of the U.S. House of Representatives from Missouri's 10th district
- In office November 5, 1918 – March 3, 1919
- Preceded by: Jacob Edwin Meeker
- Succeeded by: Cleveland A. Newton

Personal details
- Born: April 22, 1863 near Pond, Missouri, U.S.
- Died: August 18, 1946 (aged 83) Creve Coeur, Missouri, U.S.
- Resting place: Bethel Cemetery, Pond, Missouri, U.S.
- Party: Republican
- Profession: Politician

Frederick Essen (April 22, 1863 – August 18, 1946) was a U.S. representative from Missouri.

Born near Pond, St. Louis County, Missouri, Essen attended the public schools. He engaged in agricultural pursuits. Recorder of deeds of St. Louis County in 1894–1902. He engaged in newspaper business at Clayton, Missouri, becoming the owner of two papers which he combined under the name of the Watchman-Advocate. He served as delegate to the Republican National Conventions in 1904, 1908, and 1912. He served as member of the board of education of Clayton and served as president in 1909–1919.

Essen was elected as a Republican to the Sixty-fifth Congress to fill the vacancy caused by the death of Jacob Edwin Meeker and served from November 5, 1918, until March 3, 1919. He was not a candidate for renomination in 1918. He resumed newspaper activities. He was also interested in banking. He died in Creve Coeur, Missouri, August 18, 1946. He was interred in Bethel Cemetery, Pond, Missouri.

U.S. House of Representatives
Preceded by Jacob Edwin Meeker	Member of the U.S. House of Representatives from Missouri's 10th congressional district 1918–1919	Succeeded by Cleveland A. Newton
