= Cleveland A. Newton =

American politician (1873–1945)

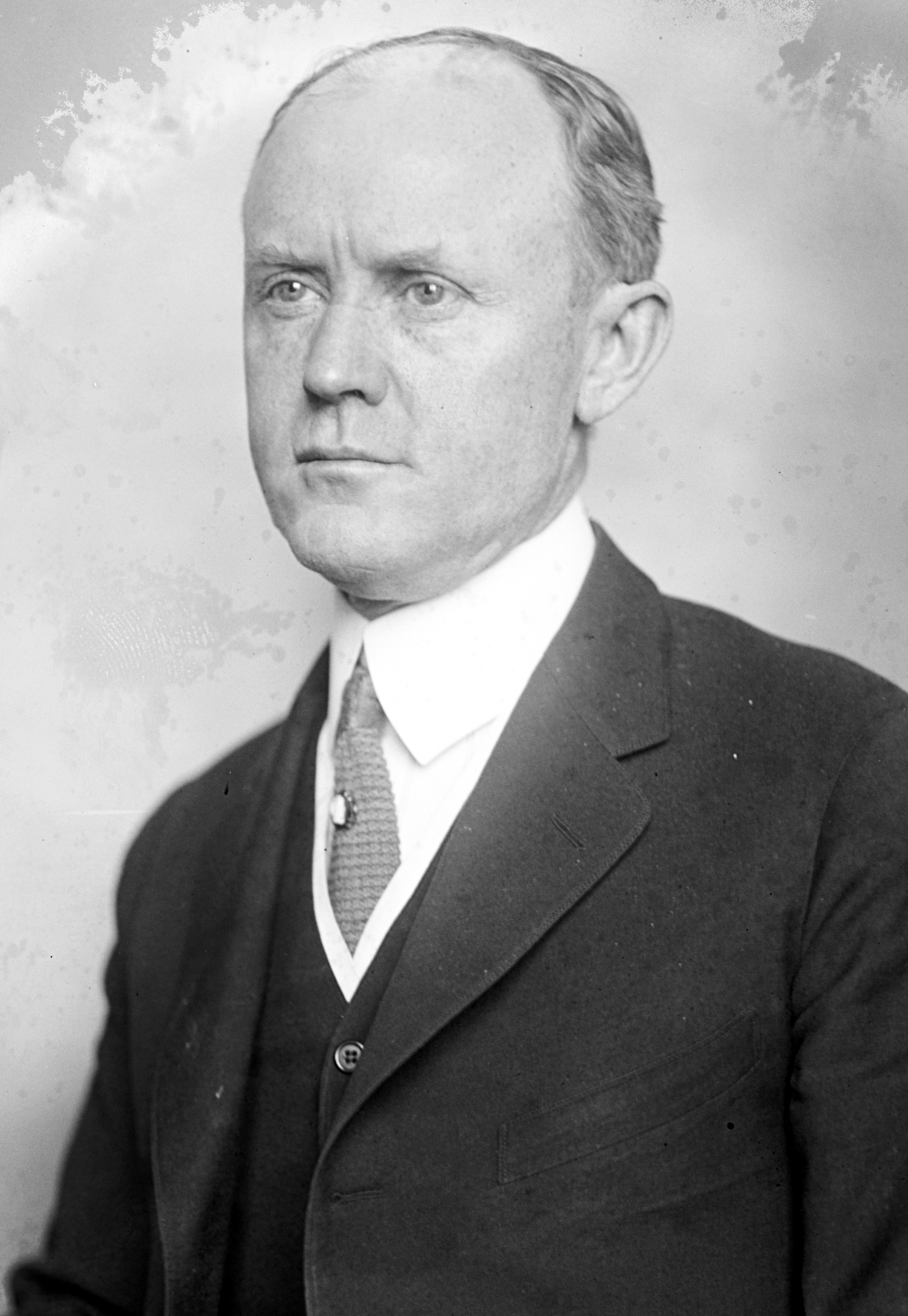

Member of the U.S. House of Representatives from Missouri's 10th district
- In office March 4, 1919 – March 3, 1927
- Preceded by: Frederick Essen
- Succeeded by: Henry F. Niedringhaus

Member of the Missouri House of Representatives
- In office 1902–1906

Personal details
- Born: September 3, 1873 Wright County, Missouri, U.S.
- Died: September 17, 1945 (aged 72) Washington, D.C., U.S.
- Party: Republican

Cleveland Alexander Newton (September 3, 1873 – September 17, 1945) was a U.S. representative from Missouri's 10th congressional district.

Born in Wright County, Missouri, Newton attended the common schools and Drury College at Springfield, Missouri. He graduated from the law department of the University of Missouri in 1902, and was admitted to the bar and commenced practice in Hartville, Missouri, in the same year. He served as a member of the Missouri House of Representatives in 1902–1906.

From 1905 to 1907, he served as Assistant United States Attorney for the western district of Missouri, when he resigned to become assistant attorney, United States circuit court at St. Louis. He resigned this office in 1911 to become special assistant to the Attorney General of the United States, which office he resigned in 1912 to resume the practice of law in St. Louis, Missouri.

Newton was elected as a Republican to the Sixty-sixth and to the three succeeding Congresses (March 4, 1919 – March 3, 1927). He was not a candidate for renomination in 1926 to the Seventieth Congress. He did make one more run for Congress in the 1934 elections; however, he was unsuccessful. Starting in 1926, he again resumed the practice of law in St. Louis, Missouri, and Washington, D.C.

Newton served as general counsel of the Mississippi Valley Association from 1928 to 1943. He died in Washington, D.C., on September 17, 1945, and was interred in Valhalla Mausoleum, St. Louis, Missouri.

U.S. House of Representatives
Preceded by Frederick Essen	Member of the U.S. House of Representatives from Missouri's 10th congressional district 1919–1927	Succeeded by Henry F. Niedringhaus
