= William M. Kinsey =

American politician and lawyer (1846–1931)

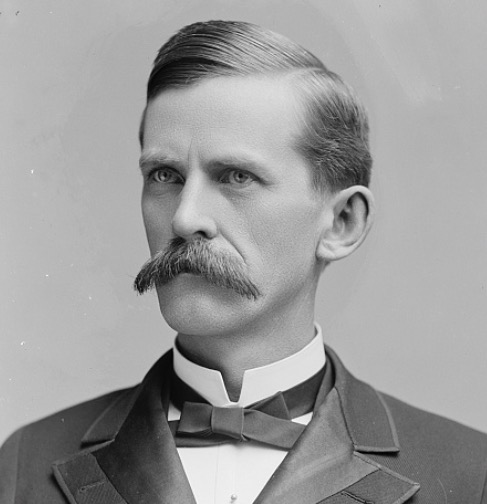
- Portrait of Kinsey by Charles Milton Bell, between 1873 and 1890

Member of the U.S. House of Representatives from Missouri's 10th district
- In office March 4, 1889 – March 3, 1891
- Preceded by: Martin L. Clardy
- Succeeded by: Samuel Byrns

Personal details
- Born: William Medcalf Kinsey; October 28, 1846 Mount Pleasant, Ohio, US
- Died: June 20, 1931 (aged 84) St. Louis, Missouri, US
- Party: Republican
- Relations: Daniel Kinsey (grandson)
- Children: 5
- Education: Monmouth College; University of Iowa College of Law
- Occupation: Politician, lawyer

William Medcalf Kinsey (October 28, 1846 – June 20, 1931) was an American politician and lawyer. A Republican, he was a member of the United States House of Representatives from Missouri.

== Early life and education ==
Kinsey was born on October 28, 1846, in Mount Pleasant, Ohio. He was descendent of Quakers who arrived in the United States alongside William Penn. He attended common schools, followed by Hopedale Academy, then Monmouth College. In 1863, he moved to Muscatine County, Iowa. There, he attended the University of Iowa College of Law, graduating in 1871.

== Career ==
Kinsey was admitted to the bar in 1872, after which he commenced practice in Muscatine County. In 1875, he moved to St. Louis, also practicing there.

A Republican, Kinsey served in the United States House of Representatives from March 4, 1889, to March 3, 1891, representing Missouri's 10th district. He lost the following election.

After serving in Congress, Kinsey returned to practicing law in St. Louis. He was appointed acting St. Louis City Attorney in 1898, serving for several months. He then served as judge of the 1st District Police Court. From c. 1905 – c. 1916, he served as a judge of the St. Louis Circuit Court, and during hus tenure presided over 1,500 divorce cases. During the construction of the Civil Courts Building, he suggested multiple mottoes which were subsequently carved into the stone. During World War I, he served as chairman of the draft examining board in Carondelet, St. Louis. He afterwards returned to practicing law after the war ended.

== Personal life and death ==
Kinsey was a member of the Orthodox Church in America. On March 21, 1872, he married schoolteacher Lucy Loretta Chapin; they had five children together. He died on June 20, 1931, aged 84, in Carondelet, St. Louis. He was buried at Sunset Hill Burial Park, in St. Louis. His grandson was Olympic hurdler Daniel Kinsey.

U.S. House of Representatives
Preceded by Martin L. Clardy	Member of the U.S. House of Representatives from Missouri's 10th congressional district 1889–1891	Succeeded by Samuel Byrns
