= American Independence Union =

The American Independence Union was formed at a one-day conference of 58 civic leaders which was called by Richard Bartholdt, a U.S. Representative from Missouri, and which was held at the New Willard Hotel in Washington on January 30, 1915. Its purpose was to agitate for strict US adherence to the principles of neutrality in World War I. Bartholdt was elected its president.
