= Big Chief Restaurant =

Eatery in Wildwood, Missouri

- U.S. National Register of Historic Places
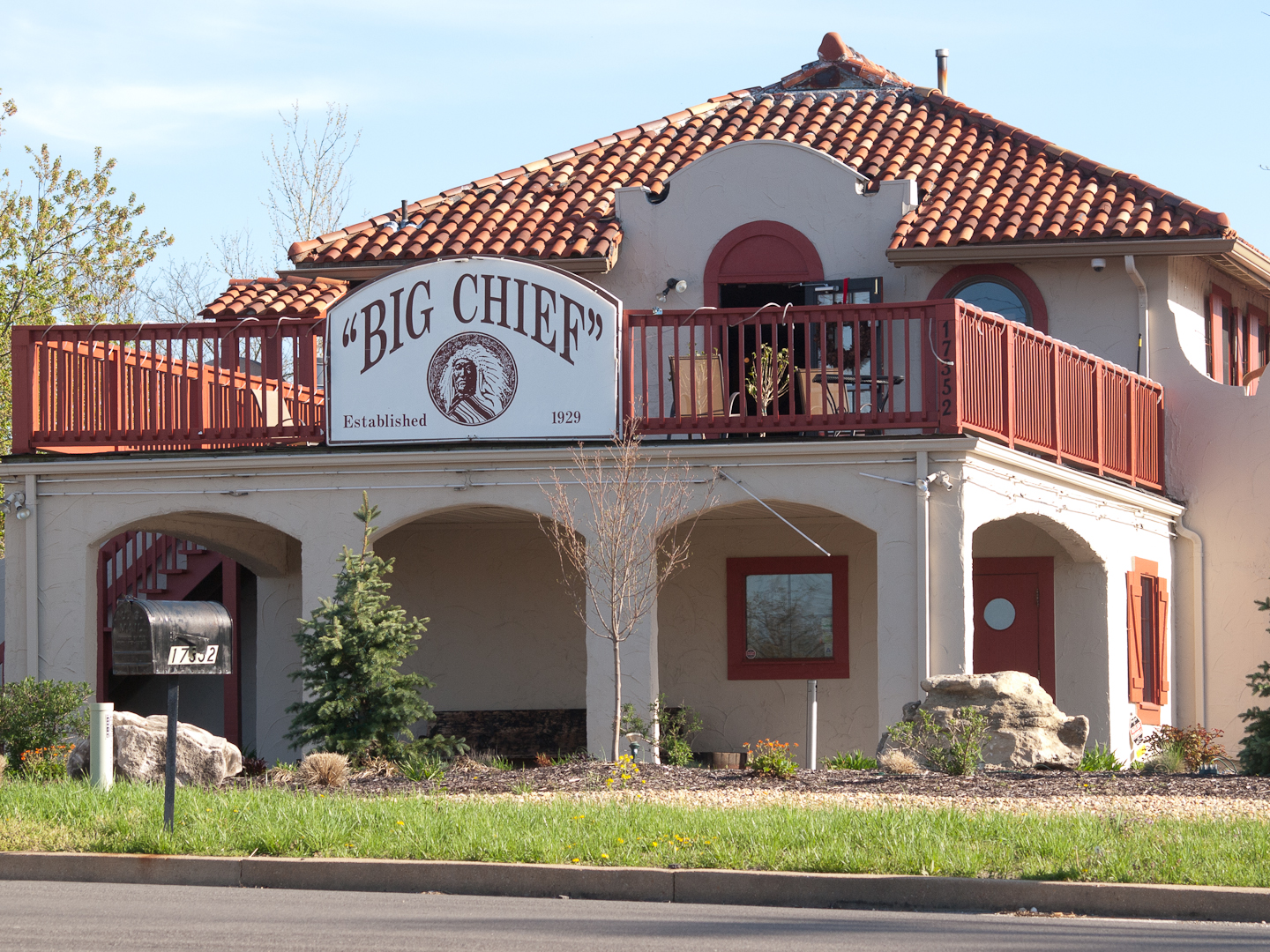
- Big Chief Restaurant, Wildwood, Missouri

- Location within Missouri Location within the United States
- Location: 17352 Manchester Road; Wildwood, Missouri
- Coordinates: 38°34′52″N 90°39′38″W
- Built: 1928
- Architect: Walter H. Petring; Highway Hotel Corporation
- Architectural style: Mission Revival
- Website: bigchiefstl.com
- NRHP reference No.: 03000181
- Added to NRHP: April 2, 2003

U.S. Route 66

Big Chief Restaurant, located at 17352 Manchester Road in Wildwood, Missouri, currently operates under the name Big Chief Roadhouse. It was also formerly known as Big Chief Highway Hotel and Big Chief Dakota Grill. The restaurant opened in 1928 as part of a tourist camp that included overnight accommodations for travelers on the newly opened U.S. Route 66 in Pond, Missouri, now incorporated within Wildwood. After the highway was later routed to bypass Pond, the business struggled to survive, operating as housing for government employees during World War II. Eventually the cabins were demolished, and the restaurant was used for other business operations. It was reopened as a restaurant in the 1990s.

== Background ==
The opening of U.S. Route 66 in 1926 made it possible for motorists to travel from Chicago to Santa Monica, California on one highway. As people began exploring the United States on the newly created thoroughfare, restaurants and overnight accommodations sprang up along the way. The lodgings were alternately known as tourist courts, tourist camps, tourist cabins, and motels.

== Beginnings on U.S. Route 66 ==
Once it was known that Route 66 would go through the community of Pond, later incorporated into Wildwood, plans were drawn up to build the Big Chief Highway Hotel complex. An article that appeared on April 19, 1929, in the Washington Citizen newspaper in Washington, Missouri, credited Walter H. Petring, of the Highway Hotel Corporation in St. Louis, as the man in charge of planning a series of tourist camps along the route. According to that source, Petring envisioned a chain of tourists camps the length of Route 66 itself, "one day's drive apart" from each. In later accounts of this, William Clay Pierce of Texas-based Pierce-Pennant Oil Company is credited as the Big Chief developer and originator of the chain concept for the endeavor. Others have claimed Pierce built another Big Chief in Illinois, which the National Park Service has deemed "unlikely". Regardless of who is credited for the idea, when the National Park Service conducted research for the NRHP certification, they found no evidence that anyone ever carried out the plans of expansion.

The 62-unit tourist camp that opened in 1928 was designed in the Mission Revival architecture style, and built at an estimated cost of $150,000–$200,000. The individual units rented for $1.50 a night, and were aligned on the property in what resembled a rectangle with one of the long sides open to the highway. The two-story restaurant at Big Chief featured a bell tower, and was a full-service establishment, more formal than the small diner-style eateries usually associated with tourist camps. It served lunch and dinner, and provided an area for "bridge parties" and banquets.

A 1928 article from the Pacific Transcript newspaper in Pacific, Missouri, mentioned that in addition to what would be considered standard amenities, each unit was provided a garage for the traveler's automobile. A locked gate kept everyone but the paying guests out, and apparently kept the guests in: "There is no driving back and forth in the night." A full service gas station was on the premises, as well as recreational facilities for both children and adults that included a concrete area on the grounds designated as a dance floor.

== Post-1932 ventures ==
Route 66 was re-routed in 1932, after which it no longer ran through Pond. With the 1933 Repeal of Prohibition in the United States, the restaurant added "The Tap" room for service of alcoholic beverages. Although business began to sag after the re-route, the Big Chief adapted by providing housing for employees at the Weldon Spring Ordnance Works, which manufactured explosives for the military during World War II, and employees of the Weldon Spring uranium processing plant.

After the restaurant's 1949 closure, the property site and existing buildings were owned by Marco and Rose Aceto, who removed the bell tower and used the restaurant for various business ventures. Their original intent of continuing the restaurant never materialized, and the cabins were eventually demolished. G. Todd DeVille purchased the remaining property in the 1990s. The restaurant re-opened in 1995 as the Big Chief Dakota Grill, and currently operates as the Big Chief Roadhouse. It is the lone survivor of the original 1928 complex.

== NRHP designation ==
Big Chief Restaurant was added to the National Register of Historic Places listings in 2003.
