= Henry F. Niedringhaus =

American politician and businessman (1864–1941)

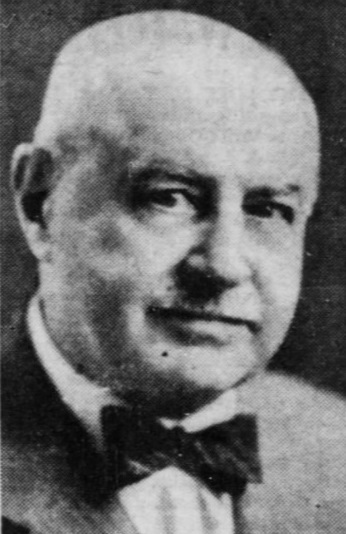

Member of the U.S. House of Representatives from Missouri's 10th district
- In office March 4, 1927 – March 3, 1933
- Preceded by: Cleveland A. Newton
- Succeeded by: District obsolete

Personal details
- Born: Henry Frederick Niedringhaus; December 15, 1864 St. Louis, Missouri, US
- Died: August 3, 1941 (aged 76) St. Louis, Missouri, US
- Resting place: Bellefontaine Cemetery
- Party: Republican
- Relations: Frederick G. Niedringhaus (uncle)
- Children: 2
- Occupation: Politician, businessman

Henry Frederick Niedringhaus (December 15, 1864 – August 3, 1941) was an American politician and businessman. A Republican, he was a member of the United States House of Representatives from Missouri.

== Early life and education ==
Niedringhaus was born on December 15, 1864, in St. Louis. He was the son of German immigrant Frederick William Niedringhaus, and the nephew of politician Frederick G. Niedringhaus. Educated at public schools, he studied at Central Wesleyan College and Smith Academy.

== Career ==
For 43 years, Niedringhaus was a manager for a National Enameling and Stamping Company plant in Granite City, Illinois, leaving the company in 1924. His work for the company made him wealthy.

Niedringhaus was a Republican. He served in the United States House of Representatives from March 4, 1927, to March 3, 1933, representing Missouri's 10th district. He lost the following election, with his district being consolidated into the 8th district.

The 10th district leaned slightly Republican in his first two elections, but in his third election in 1930, Niedringhaus won 99.8% of the vote. Politically, he was more liberal than the majority of his party, though was an ideological median compared to all of Congress. During his tenure, he was a member of the Committee on Rivers and Harbors. He voted to repeal the Eighteenth Amendment, opposed paying bonuses to World War I veterans, and opposed the Garner-Wagner Relief Bill.

After serving in Congress, Niedringhaus retired from work and remained in St. Louis.

== Personal life and death ==
In 1889, Niedringhaus married Cora Boucher, who died in 1916. In 1928 or 1930, he married Ariel L. Cargo. He had two children. He was a Freemason, being Potentate of the Shriners in 1916. He was also president of the Shriners Hospital for Children in St. Louis. He died on August 3, 1941, aged 76, in St. Louis, and was buried at Bellefontaine Cemetery.

U.S. House of Representatives
| Preceded by Cleveland A. Newton | Member of the U.S. House of Representatives from Missouri's 10th congressional district 1927–1933 | Succeeded by District obsolete |
