= Jacob Edwin Meeker =

American politician

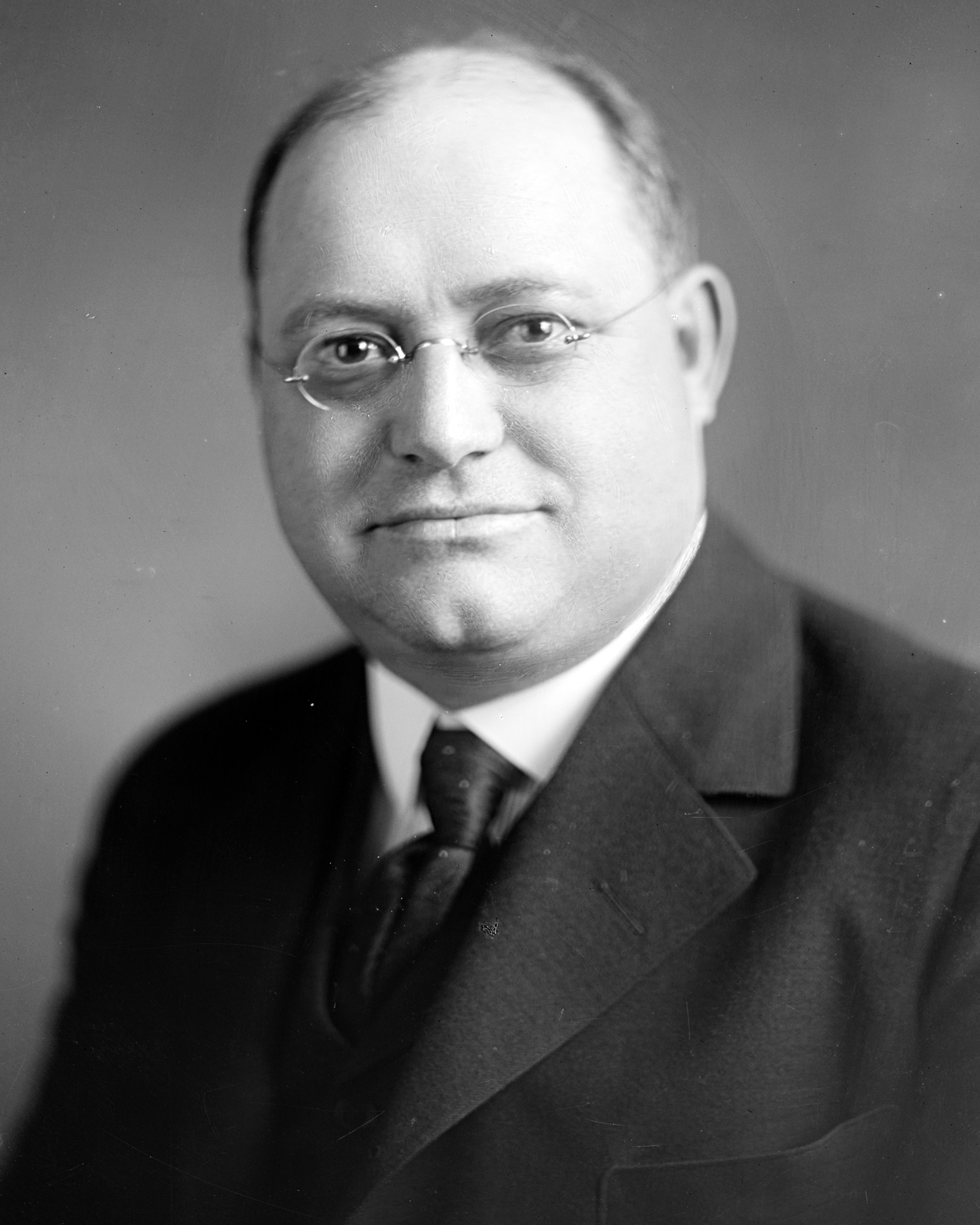

Member of the U.S. House of Representatives from Missouri's 10th district
- In office March 4, 1915 – October 16, 1918
- Preceded by: Richard Bartholdt
- Succeeded by: Frederick Essen

Personal details
- Born: October 7, 1878 Attica, Indiana, U.S.
- Died: October 16, 1918 (aged 40) St. Louis, Missouri, U.S.
- Cause of death: Spanish flu
- Resting place: Union Cemetery, Attica, Indiana, U.S.
- Party: Republican

Jacob Edwin Meeker (October 7, 1878 – October 16, 1918) was a U.S. representative from Missouri.

== Background ==
Born near Attica, Indiana, Meeker attended public schools. He graduated from Union Christian College, Merom, Indiana, in 1900, and from Oberlin Theological Seminary in 1904. While a student at Union Christian College he became pastor of a rural church in Vermilion County, Illinois. He was ordained as a minister in 1901 and assumed his duties in Vermilion County.

He was a missionary in Eldon, Missouri, for the Congregational Church in 1904. He moved to St. Louis, Missouri, in 1906 to take charge of the Compton Hill Congregational Church. He resigned in 1912. He studied law at Benton College of Law and was admitted to the bar in 1914.

Meeker was elected as a Republican to the Sixty-fourth and Sixty-fifth Congresses and served from March 4, 1915, until his death from Spanish flu in St. Louis, Missouri, on October 16, 1918.

He was interred in Union Cemetery, Attica, Indiana.

== See also ==
- List of members of the United States Congress who died in office (1900–1949)

U.S. House of Representatives
Preceded by Richard Bartholdt	Member of the U.S. House of Representatives from Missouri's 10th congressional district 1915–1918	Succeeded by Frederick Essen
