= Missouri's 10th congressional district =

Former U.S. House district in southeastern Missouri

- Obsolete district
- Created: 1870; 1935
- Eliminated: 1930; 1980
- Years active: 1873-1933; 1935-1983

The 10th congressional district of Missouri was a congressional district for the United States House of Representatives in Missouri from 1873 to 1983. It was eliminated as a result of the redistricting cycle after the 1980 census. Most of the territory that was part of the 10th at the time it was abolished is now part of the 8th district.

== List of members representing the district ==
| Representative | Party | Years | Cong ress | Electoral history |
|---|---|---|---|---|
District created March 4, 1873
| Ira B. Hyde (Princeton) | Republican | March 4, 1873 – March 3, 1875 | 43rd | Elected in 1872. Lost re-election. |
| Rezin A. DeBolt (Trenton) | Democratic | March 4, 1875 – March 3, 1877 | 44th | Elected in 1874. Retired. |
| Henry M. Pollard (Chillicothe) | Republican | March 4, 1877 – March 3, 1879 | 45th | Elected in 1876. Lost re-election. |
| Gideon F. Rothwell (Moberly) | Democratic | March 4, 1879 – March 3, 1881 | 46th | Elected in 1878. Lost renomination. |
| Joseph H. Burrows (Cainsville) | Greenback | March 4, 1881 – March 3, 1883 | 47th | Elected in 1880. Lost re-election. |
| Martin L. Clardy (Farmington) | Democratic | March 4, 1883 – March 3, 1889 | 48th 49th 50th | Redistricted from the 1st district and re-elected in 1882. Re-elected in 1884. Re-elected in 1886. Lost re-election. |
| William M. Kinsey (St. Louis) | Republican | March 4, 1889 – March 3, 1891 | 51st | Elected in 1888. Lost re-election. |
| Samuel Byrns (Potosi) | Democratic | March 4, 1891 – March 3, 1893 | 52nd | Elected in 1890. Lost renomination. |
| Richard Bartholdt (St. Louis) | Republican | March 4, 1893 – March 3, 1915 | 53rd 54th 55th 56th 57th 58th 59th 60th 61st 62nd 63rd | Elected in 1892. Re-elected in 1894. Re-elected in 1896. Re-elected in 1898. Re-elected in 1900. Re-elected in 1902. Re-elected in 1904. Re-elected in 1906. Re-elected in 1908. Re-elected in 1910. Re-elected in 1912. Retired. |
| Jacob E. Meeker (St. Louis) | Republican | March 4, 1915 – October 16, 1918 | 64th 65th | Elected in 1914. Re-elected in 1916. Died. |
| Vacant | | October 16, 1918 – November 5, 1918 | 65th | |
| Frederick Essen (Clayton) | Republican | November 5, 1918 – March 3, 1919 | 65th | Elected to finish Meeker's term. Retired. |
| Cleveland A. Newton (St. Louis) | Republican | March 4, 1919 – March 3, 1927 | 66th 67th 68th 69th | Elected in 1918. Re-elected in 1920. Re-elected in 1922. Re-elected in 1924. Retired. |
| Henry F. Niedringhaus (St. Louis) | Republican | March 4, 1927 – March 3, 1933 | 70th 71st 72nd | Elected in 1926. Re-elected in 1928. Re-elected in 1930. Redistricted to the At-large district and lost re-election. |
| District inactive | | March 4, 1933 – January 3, 1935 | 73rd | All representatives elected At-large on a general ticket |
| Orville Zimmerman (Kennett) | Democratic | January 3, 1935 – April 7, 1948 | 74th 75th 76th 77th 78th 79th 80th | Elected in 1934. Re-elected in 1936. Re-elected in 1938. Re-elected in 1940. Re-elected in 1942; Re-elected in 1944. Re-elected in 1946. Died. |
| Vacant | | April 7, 1948 – November 2, 1948 | 80th | |
| Paul C. Jones (Kennett) | Democratic | November 2, 1948 – January 3, 1969 | 80th 81st 82nd 83rd 84th 85th 86th 87th 88th 89th 90th | Elected to finish Zimmerman's term. Elected to full term in 1948. Re-elected in 1950. Re-elected in 1952. Re-elected in 1954. Re-elected in 1956. Re-elected in 1958. Re-elected in 1960. Re-elected in 1962. Re-elected in 1964. Re-elected in 1966. Retired. |
| Bill Burlison (Cape Girardeau) | Democratic | January 3, 1969 – January 3, 1981 | 91st 92nd 93rd 94th 95th 96th | Elected in 1968. Re-elected in 1970. Re-elected in 1972. Re-elected in 1974. Re-elected in 1976. Re-elected in 1978. Lost re-election. |
| Bill Emerson (DeSoto) | Republican | January 3, 1981 – January 3, 1983 | 97th | Elected in 1980. Redistricted to the 8th district. |
District eliminated January 3, 1983
