= Pond, Missouri =

Neighborhood in Missouri, U.S.

- Former Unincorporated community
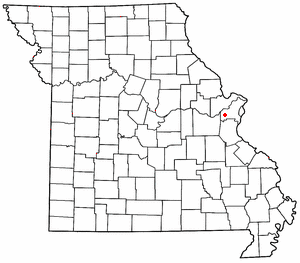

- Location within Missouri
- Coordinates: 38°34′49″N 90°39′22″W
- Country: United States
- State: Missouri
- County: St. Louis
- Time zone: UTC−6 (Central (CST))
  - Summer (DST): UTC−5 (CDT)
- ZIP code: 63038
- Area code: 314

Pond was an unincorporated community in western St. Louis County, Missouri, United States. It was located on Old Manchester Road (part of the original alignment of U.S. Route 66), but has now been wholly incorporated into Wildwood. Pond was home to the Big Chief Hotel, now a historic landmark.
