= Concordia Cemetery (Buffalo, New York) =

Historic cemetery in New York, United States

- U.S. National Register of Historic Places
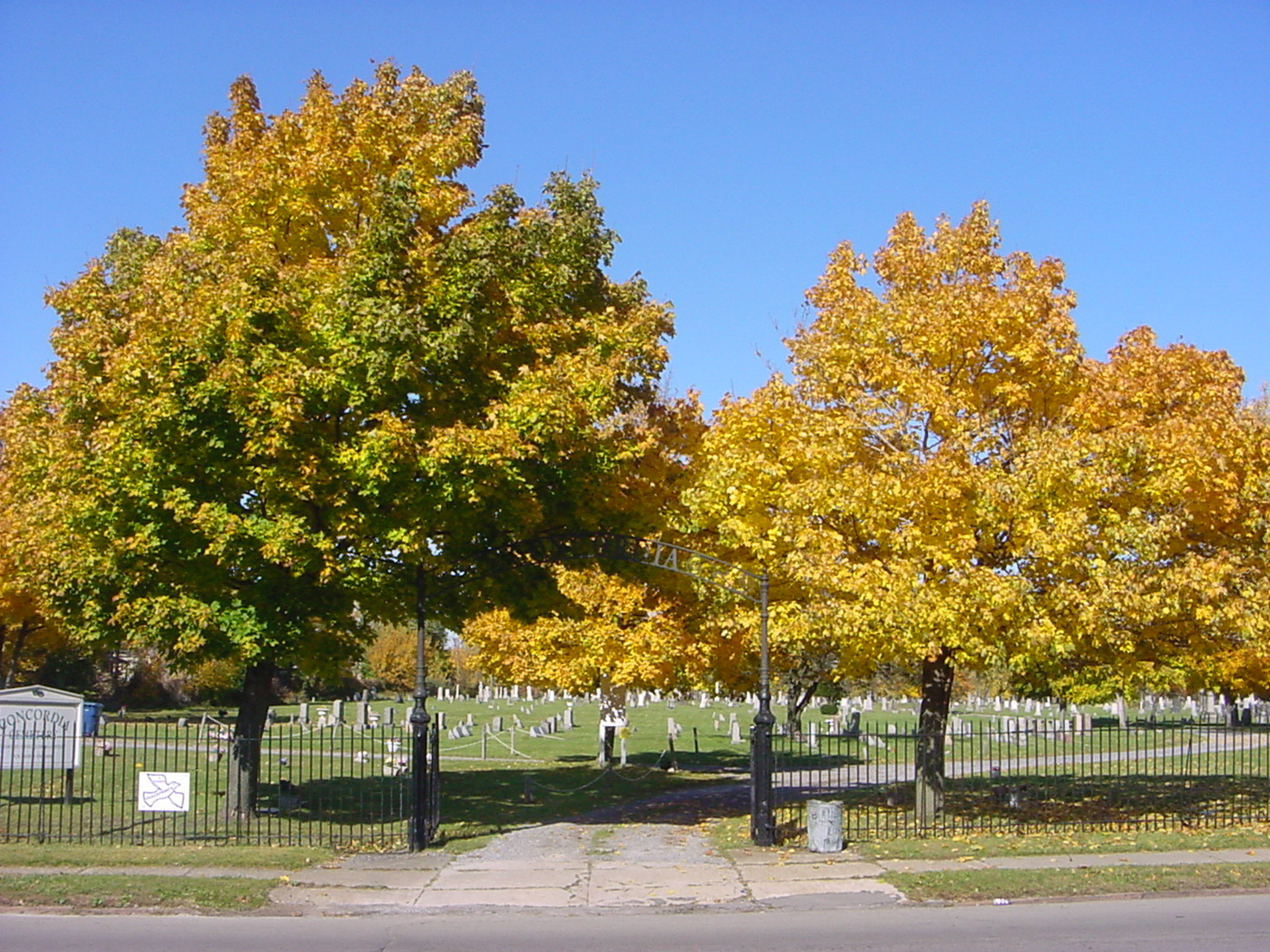
- The entrance to Concordia Cemetery

- Location within New York Location within the United States
- Location: 438 Walden Ave., Buffalo, New York
- Coordinates: 42°54′22″N 78°49′10″W
- Area: 15 acres (6.1 ha)
- Built: 1859
- NRHP reference No.: 08000106
- Added to NRHP: February 28, 2008

Concordia Cemetery is a historic cemetery in Buffalo in Erie County, New York. It consists of a 15-acre (61,000 m^{2}) rectangular plot and was founded in 1859 by three German congregations: First Trinity Lutheran Church, St. Peter's Evangelical Church, and St. Stephen's Evangelical Church. It has an important association with the immigrant German community in Buffalo during the late 19th and early 20th centuries. The cemetery includes approximately 21,000 plots.

John McHugh (1844–1910), Indian Campaigns Medal of Honor recipient is buried in Condordia.

It was listed on the National Register of Historic Places in 2008.

== Gallery ==
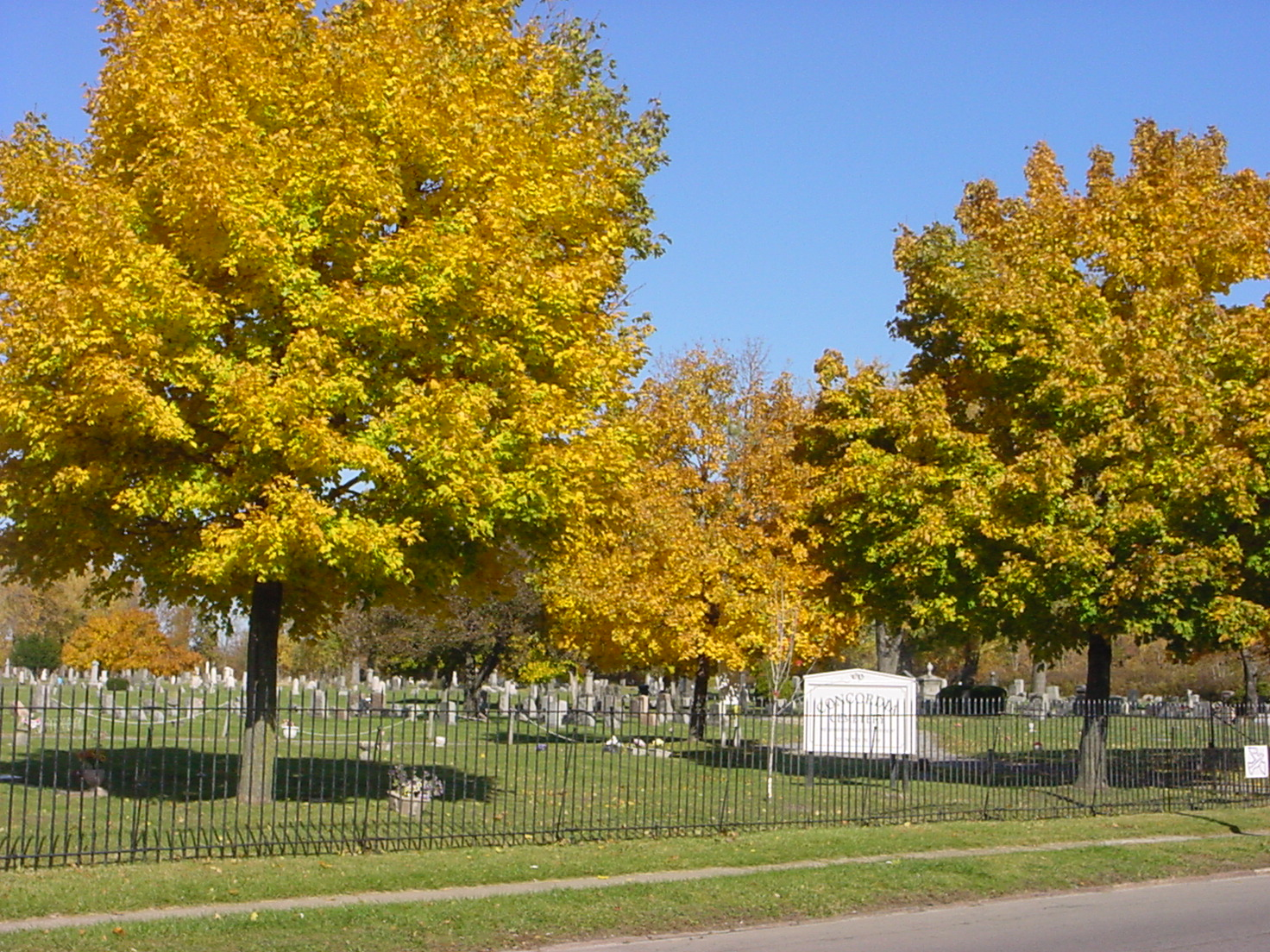
Concordia Cemetery
