= List of historic properties in Tombstone, Arizona =

- Town
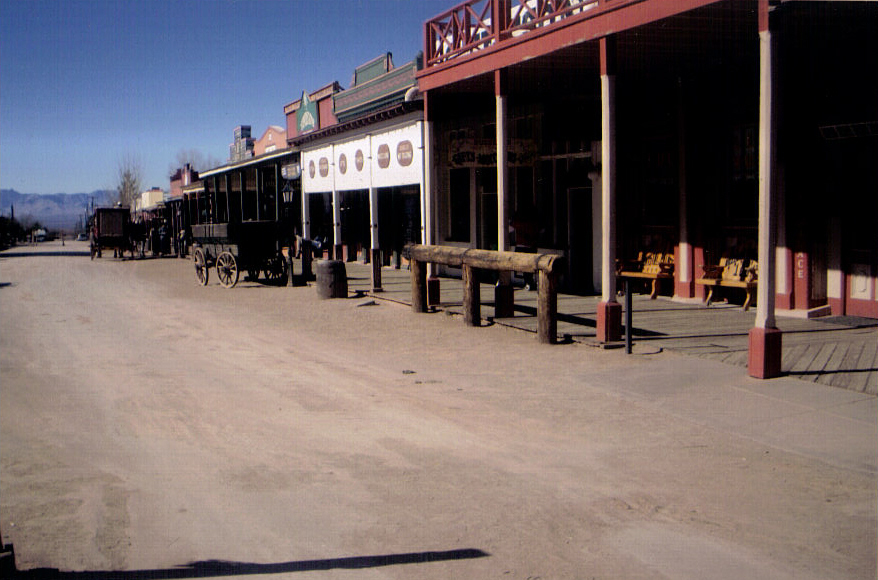
- Historic Allen Street

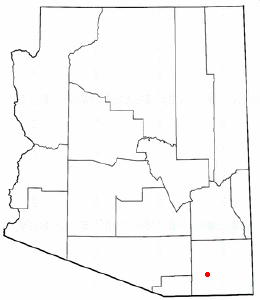
- Location in Cochise County and the state of Arizona

This is a list of historic properties in Tombstone, Arizona, which includes a photographic gallery of some of the remaining historic structures. The majority of these structures are in the Tombstone Historic District which was declared a National Historic Landmark in 1961. The district was added to the National Register of Historic Places (NRHP) on October 15, 1966. The gallery includes the Sacred Heart Church, St. Paul's Episcopal Church, the Tombstone City Hall, and the Tombstone Courthouse, among many other historic structures. The historic Boot Hill Graveyard is also included here, with images of the graves of some of the town's notable internees; however, the graveyard was specifically excluded from the NRHP historic district due to its lack of historic integrity.

== Brief history ==
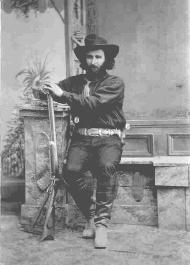
Ed Schieffelin in 1880

Tombstone was a mining town founded in 1879 by Ed Schieffelin. Schieffelin was a prospector who laid claim to what became one of the biggest silver mines in Pima County, Arizona Territory. The mine was named the Schieffelin Mine. Schieffelin, together with some partners, owned or had interest in the Contention Mine and the Tombstone Mining and Milling Company, which owned the Tough Nut Mine. Prospectors and business entrepreneurs began to settle the town after news spread of the silver strike.

On October 26, 1881, Tombstone gained national notoriety with the famous Gunfight at the O.K. Corral involving the brothers Wyatt, Morgan, and Virgil Earp (the town marshal and a deputy U.S. marshal), joined by Doc Holliday, against Ike Clanton, Billy Clanton, Frank McLaury, Tom McLaury, and Billy Claiborne, members of an outlaw group called the Cochise County Cowboys.

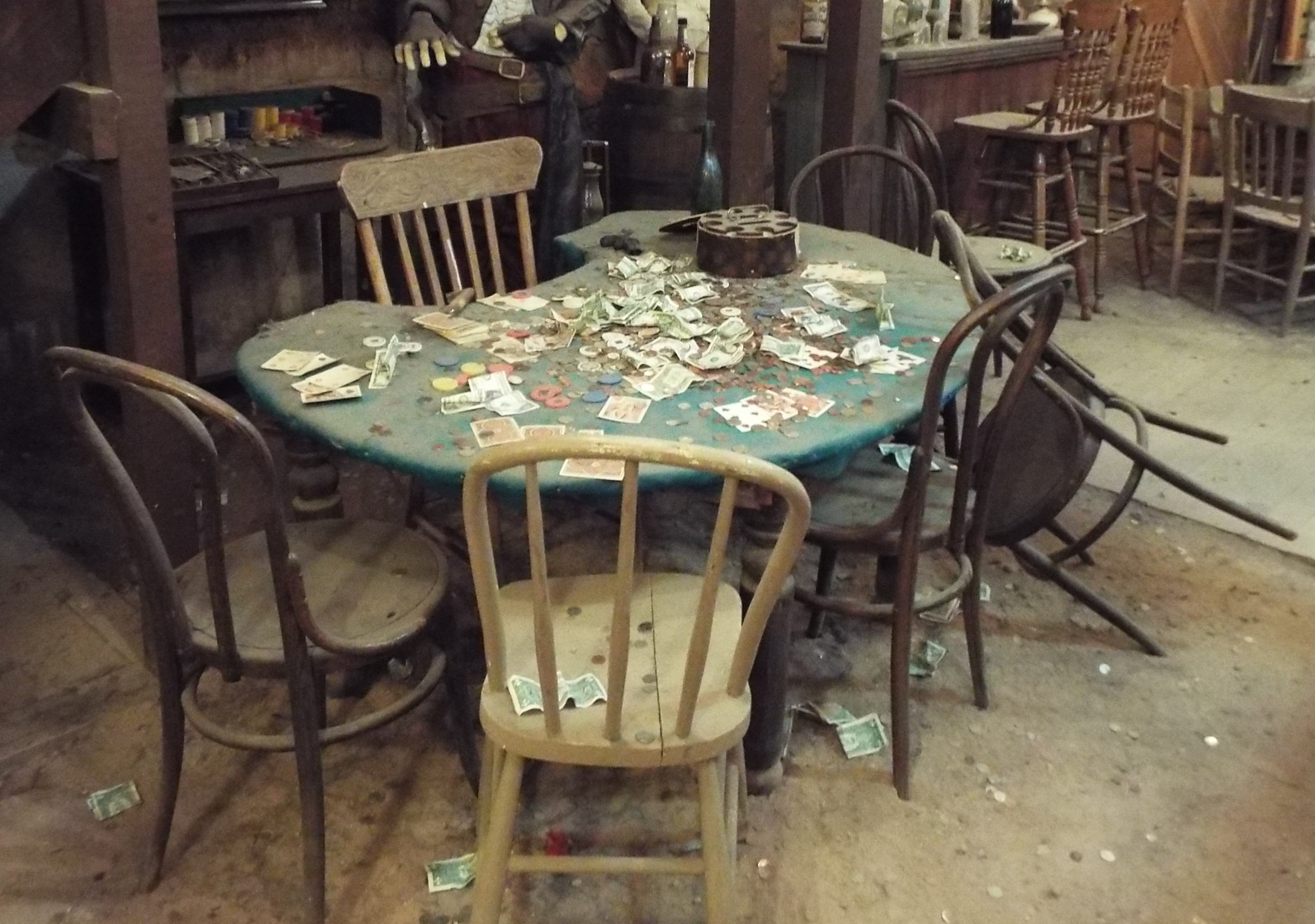
Bird Cage Theatre poker table where the longest poker game was played

One of Tombstones best known structures is the historic Bird Cage Theatre. The theatre provided the citizens of the town with entertainment including live performances, liquor, prostitutes, and poker games. The longest poker game in history was played in the basement of the theater. Players had to pay $1,000 for a seat at the table. Wyatt Earp, Doc Holliday, Bat Masterson, George Hearst, Diamond Jim Brady, and Adolphus Busch were some of the notable players. The poker game was played continuously 24 hours a day, seven days a week, for eight years from 1881 to 1889. Approximately $10 million was exchanged in the game through those eight years, and the Bird Cage retained ten percent of that money.

The structures along Allen Street are included in the Tombstone Historic District, which was declared a National Historic Landmark on July 4, 1961. The district was also added to the National Register of Historic Places on October 15, 1966, reference #66000171.

== Structures and places of historical interest ==
=== Tombstone Historic District ===
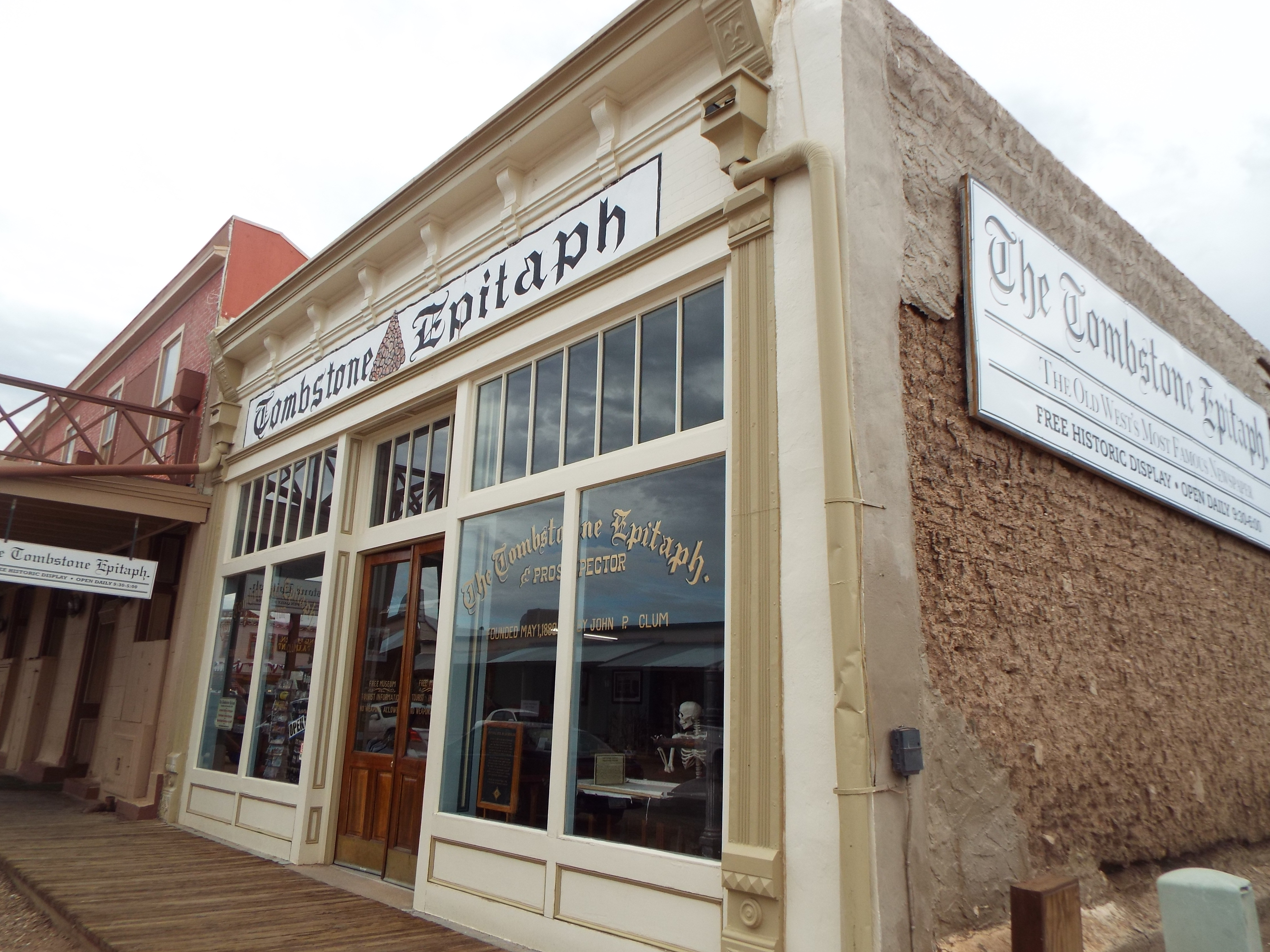
The Tombstone Epitaph building

The following are the major, registered structures in the Tombstone Historic District:

- The O.K. Corral – The adobe offices of the famous corral are on Allen Street between Third and Fourth, with the stable yards extending back to Fremont Street. The O.K. Corral is near the site of the famous gunfight of October 21, 1882 which occurred in an empty lot by Fly's Photography Gallery on Fremont Street. The gunfighters were Wyatt, Virgil, and Morgan Earp, and Doc Holliday, against Ike Clanton, Billy Clanton, Frank McLaury, Tom McLaury, and Billy Claiborne, members of the Cochise County Cowboys.
- The Crystal Palace – The Crystal Palace was built in 1879 at 436 E. Allen Street. Originally known as the Golden Eagle Brewing Company, its second floor housed the offices of U.S. Deputy Marshal Virgil Earp.
- The Tombstone Epitaph building – The Tombstone Epitaph newspaper was established in this building, constructed in 1880 at 11 S. 5th Street, as a Republican paper under the operation of John P. Clum, Thomas Sorin, and later that year, Charles Reppy.
- The Bird Cage Theatre – The theater was built in 1881 at 535 E. Allen Street. It was combination theater, saloon, gambling parlor, and brothel that operated from 1881 to 1889.
- Schieffelin Hall – The theater hall was built in 1881 by Albert Schieffelin at 402 East Fremont Street (N. 4th Street).

The Crabtree Livery Stable and San Jose House are in the background of this 1940 photograph.

- The San Jose House and Crabtree Livery Stable – These two single story adobe buildings were constructed in 1881 at the corner of Fremont and Fifth Streets. The San Jose House, formerly a boarding house, is faced with metal siding and has a simple ornamental cornice.
- The Tombstone Courthouse – The courthouse was built in 1882 at 223 E. Toughnut Street. It was individually listed in the National Register of Historic Places on April 13, 1972, reference #72000196, and is also included in the historic district listing.
- Tombstone City Hall – The city hall was built in 1882 at 306 E. Fremont Street. It was listed in the National Register of Historic Places on February 1, 1972, reference #72000195, and is also included in the historic district listing.

Other structures within the boundaries of the Tombstone Historic District, along Allen, Fremont, and Toughnut Streets:

- The Can Can Restaurant – The corner building was built in 1876 at Allen and 4th Streets.
- The Bella Union Saloon and Opera House – The building was constructed in 1878 on the corner of Fremont and 4th Streets.
- The Oriental Saloon – The saloon building was built in 1880 at 500 E. Allen Street (5th and Allen). Wyatt Earp was employed as a faro dealer in the Oriental.
- The Bucket of Blood Saloon – This building once housed the Holiday Water Company and the Owl Cafe and Hotel. It is the oldest continually operated restaurant in Tombstone. The structure was built c. 1880 at 501 E. Allen Street. The present-day building was erected in the 1950s and was renamed the Longhorn Restaurant in the 1970s. Virgil Earp was shot from the second floor on December 29, 1881.
- Vogan's Alley Bar and Grill – A saloon and bowling alley built in 1880 at 487 E. Allen Street. James Earp (another brother of Wyatt's) worked there before opening his own establishment called the Sampling Room.
- Fly's Photography Gallery – The structure was built in 1880 at 312 Fremont Street.
- Big Nose Kate's Saloon – The saloon was once the Grand Hotel. The original building was constructed in 1881 at 417 E. Allen Street.
- The Silver Nugget Bed and Breakfast – The structure was built in 1881 at 520 E. Allen Street.
- Allen English home – The house was built in 1882 at 304 Toughnut Street, opposite the courthouse. English initially worked as a miner, then a partner in the Smith and Goodrich law firm. He also served three terms as Cochise County District Attorney.

The following religious buildings have individual NRHP listings:

- The Sacred Heart Catholic Church Parish and the Sacred Heart Catholic Church – The parish rectory and original church building was constructed in 1881, a second church in 1882, and a third church in 1947, all at 516 Safford Street. The buildings were listed together in the National Register of Historic Places on February 22, 2002, reference #02000032.
- St. Paul's Episcopal Church – The church was built in 1882 at Safford and 3rd Streets. It was listed in the National Register of Historic Places on September 22, 1971, reference #71000111.

=== Other structures of historical interest ===
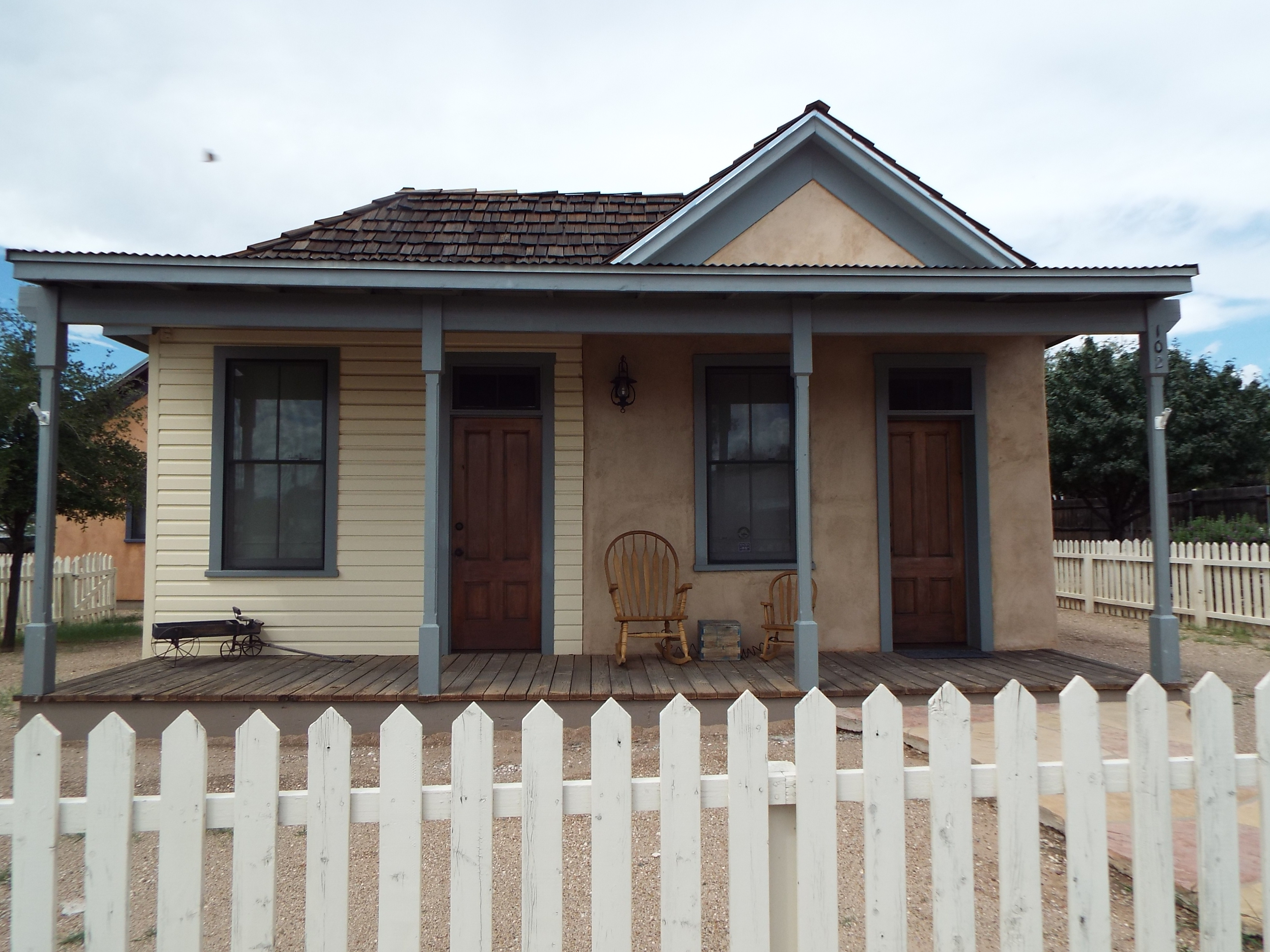
The Wyatt Earp House and Gallery, on the corner of Fremont and 1st Streets; an art museum, not a house once owned by Wyatt and Mattie Earp

- The Ed Schieffelin Monument – The grave of Ed Schieffelin, the founder of Tombstone. The monument, on a hill on West Schieffelin Monument Road, is a claim marker 25 ft (7.6 m) tall and 16 ft (4.9 m) in diameter constructed over Schieffelin's grave.
- Schiefflin's Mine – The mine was founded in 1877 by Ed Schieffelin.
- Tombstone High School – The original high school building built in 1922 at 605 East Fremont Street. A notable alumni of the high school was Lorna E. Lockwood, Justice of the Arizona Supreme Court, and the first female chief justice of a state Supreme Court in the United States.
- Wyatt Earp House and Gallery – built in 1879 on the corner of Fremont and 1st Streets. It is an art museum located near the site of a house owned by Wyatt Earp.
- The William Herring building – This building served as the home and office of William Herring, Wyatt Earp's lawyer in the second trial of the O.K. Corral gunfight. In 1893, his daughter Sarah became the first woman to practice before the Arizona Supreme Court and, in 1913, she became the first woman ever to argue a case unassisted by male counsel before the United States Supreme Court. The building now houses the Tombstone Western Heritage Museum.
- The Territorial Drug Co – Tombstone Pharmacy established in 1898.

== Historic structures gallery ==
Historic structures in Tombstone, Arizona
(listed on the National Register of Historic Places and other Tombstone historic sites)

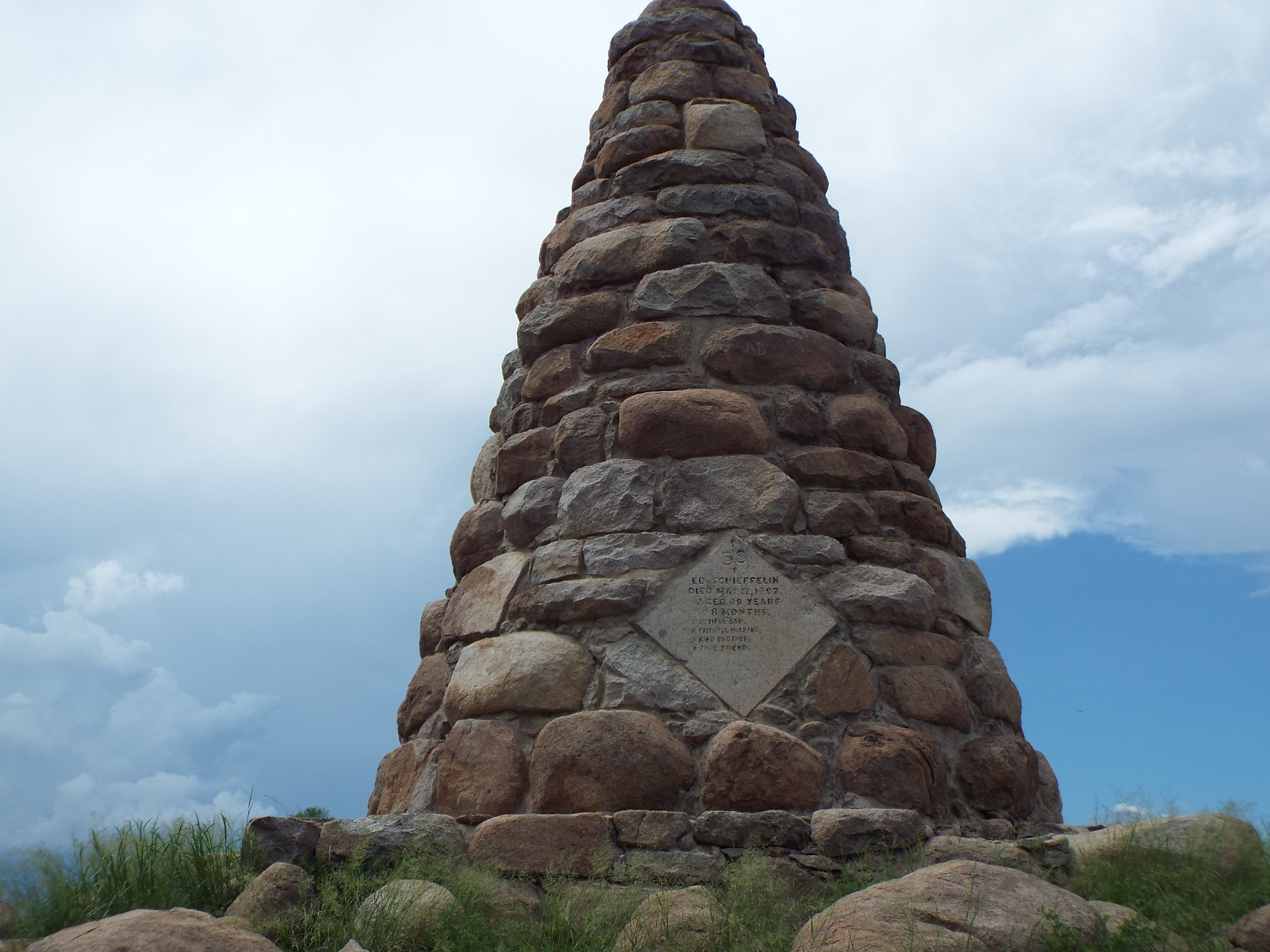
The Ed Schieffelin Monument marks the grave of Tombstone's founder.

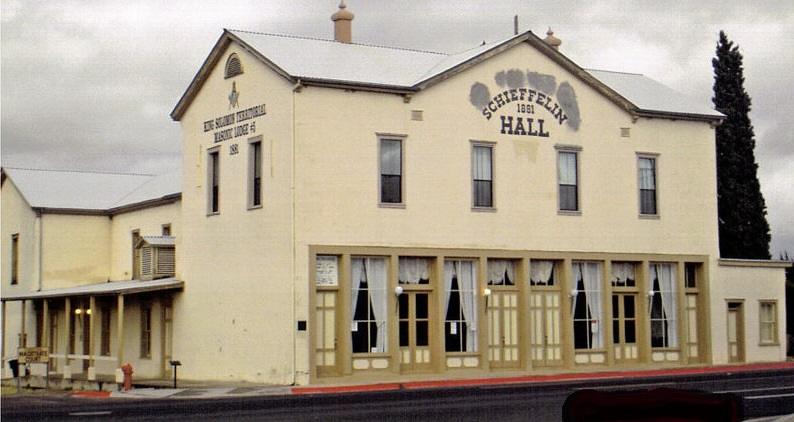
Schieffelin Hall

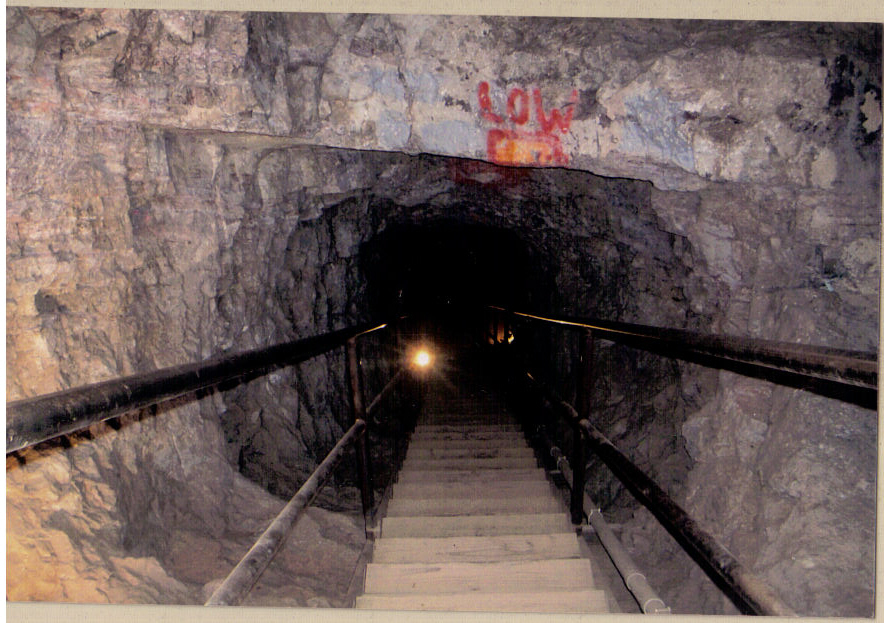
Inside Schieffelin's silver mine

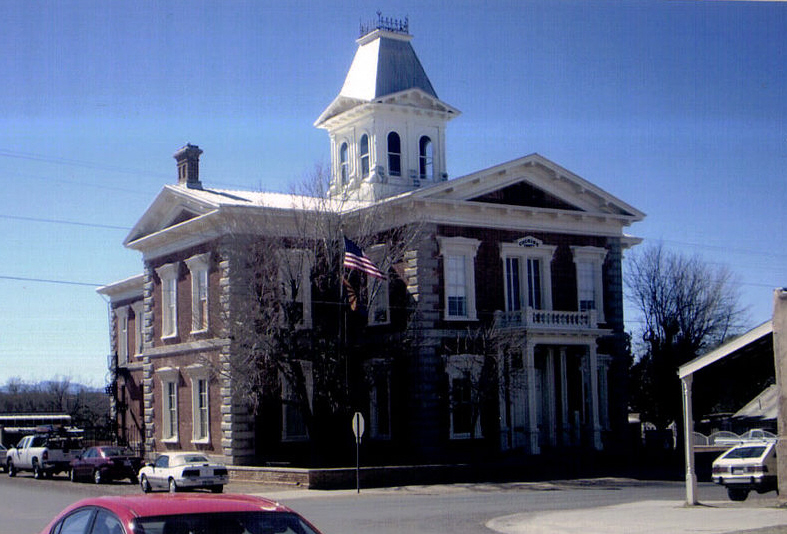
Tombstone Courthouse

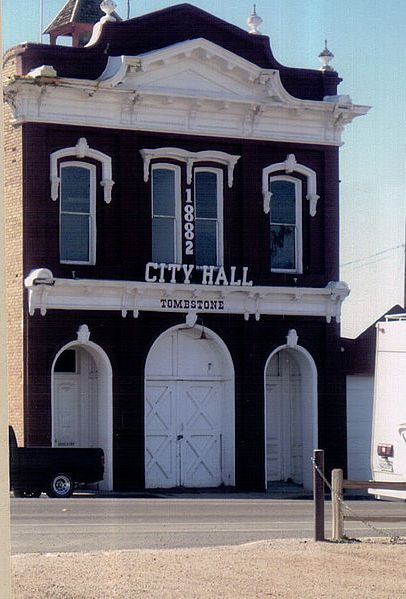
Tombstone City Hall

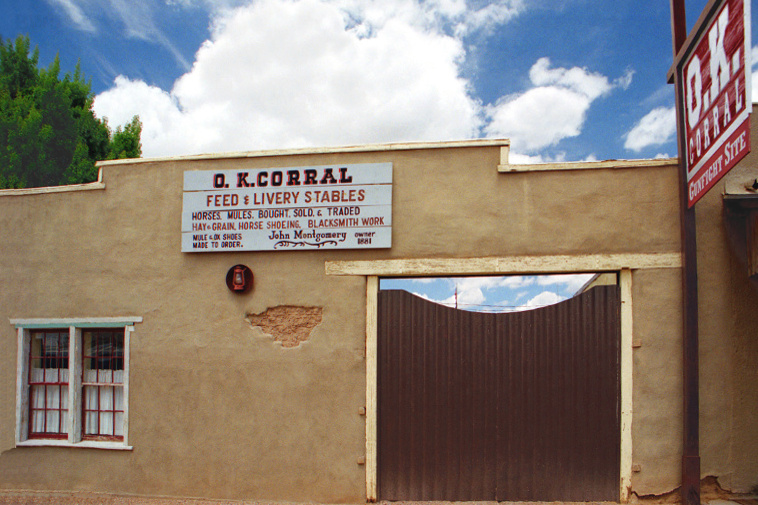
The O.K. Corral, Allen Street entrance

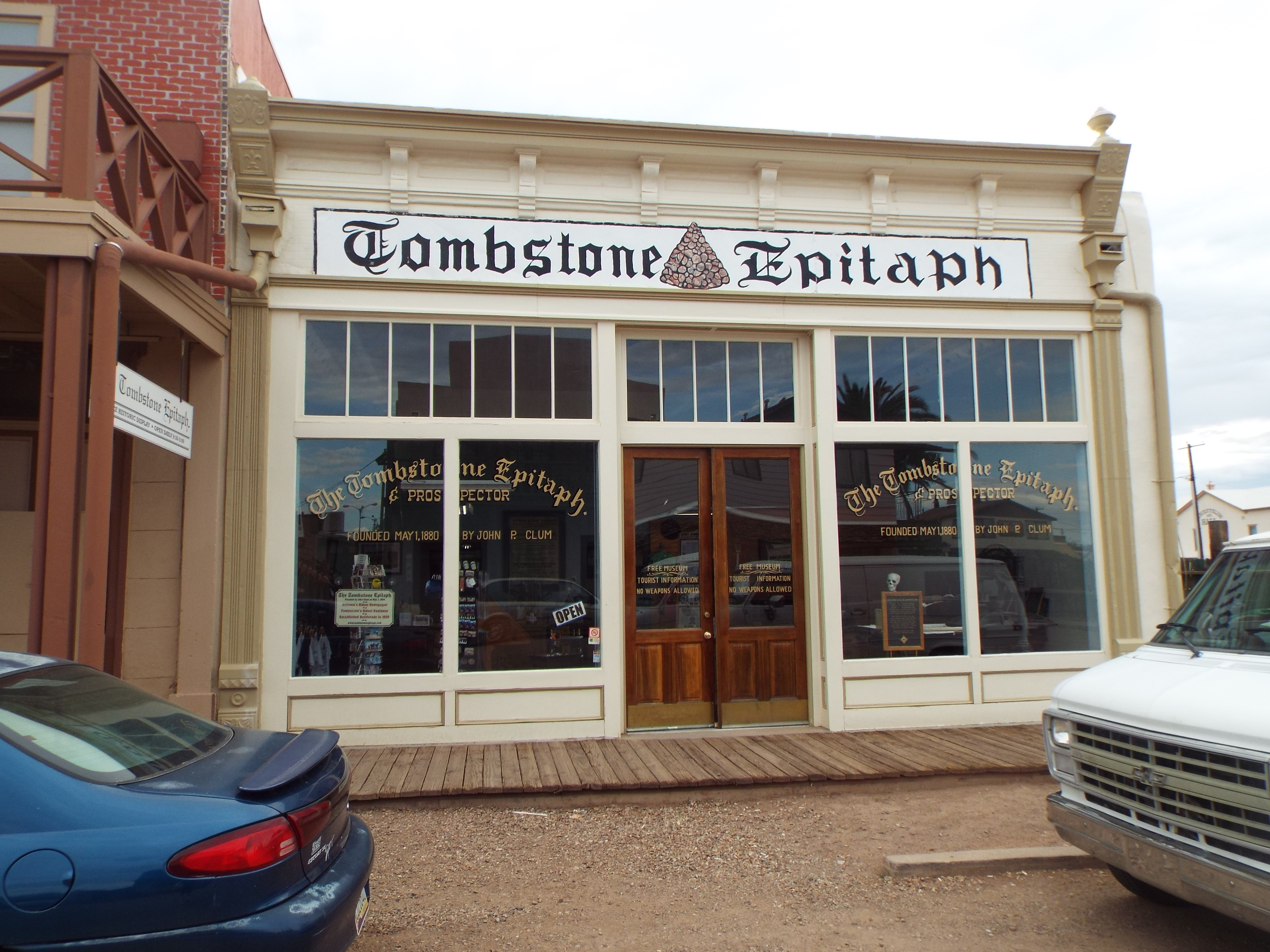
The Tombstone Epitaph building

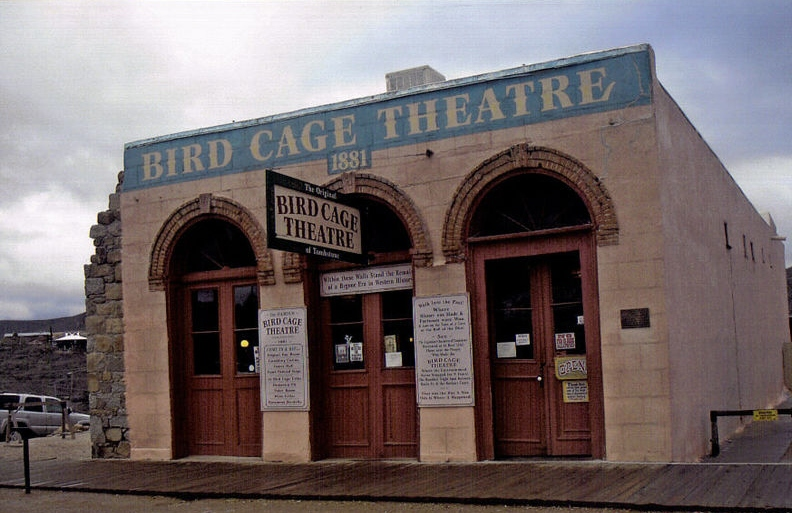
The Bird Cage Theatre

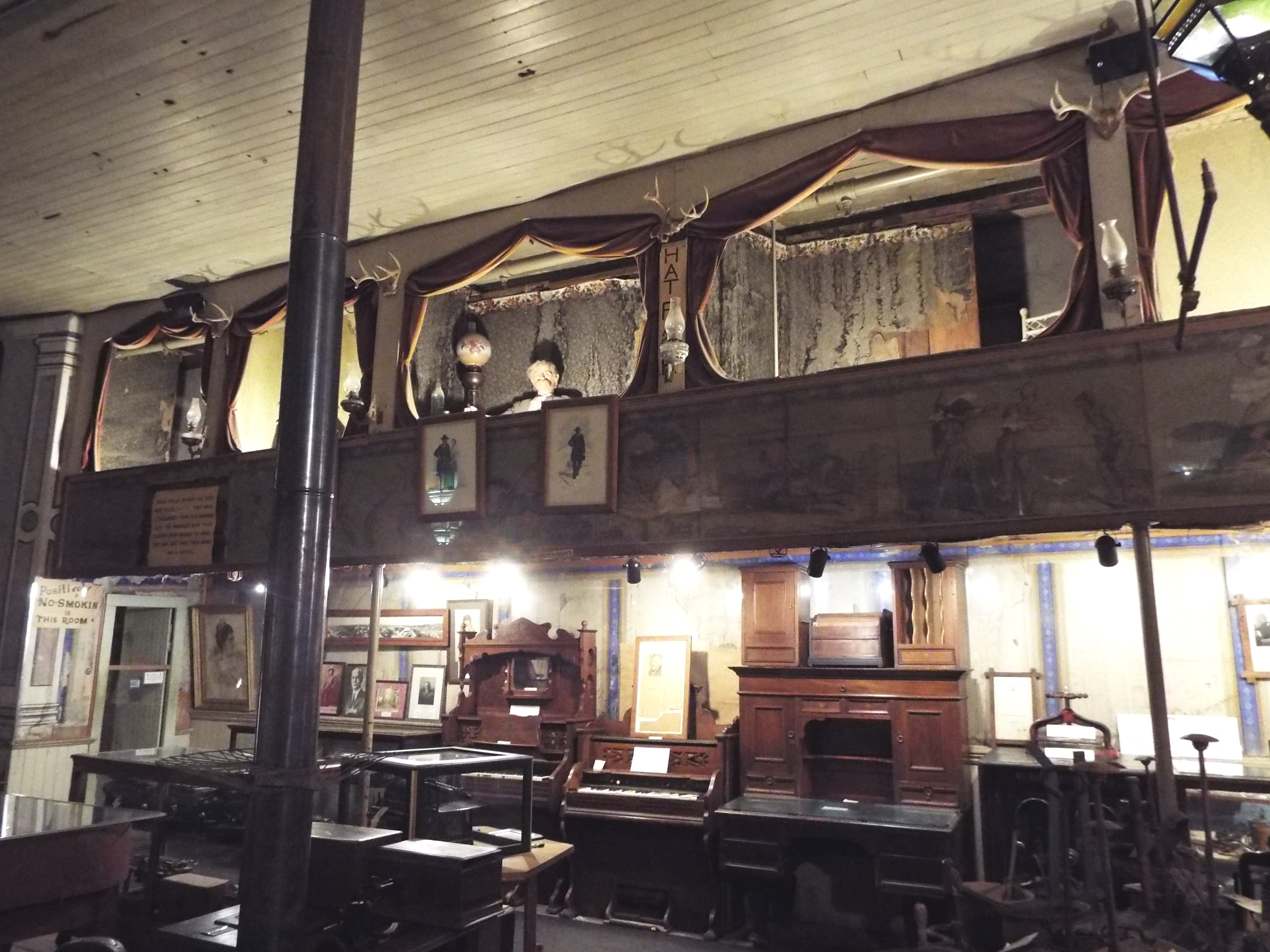
Balcony inside the Bird Cage Theatre

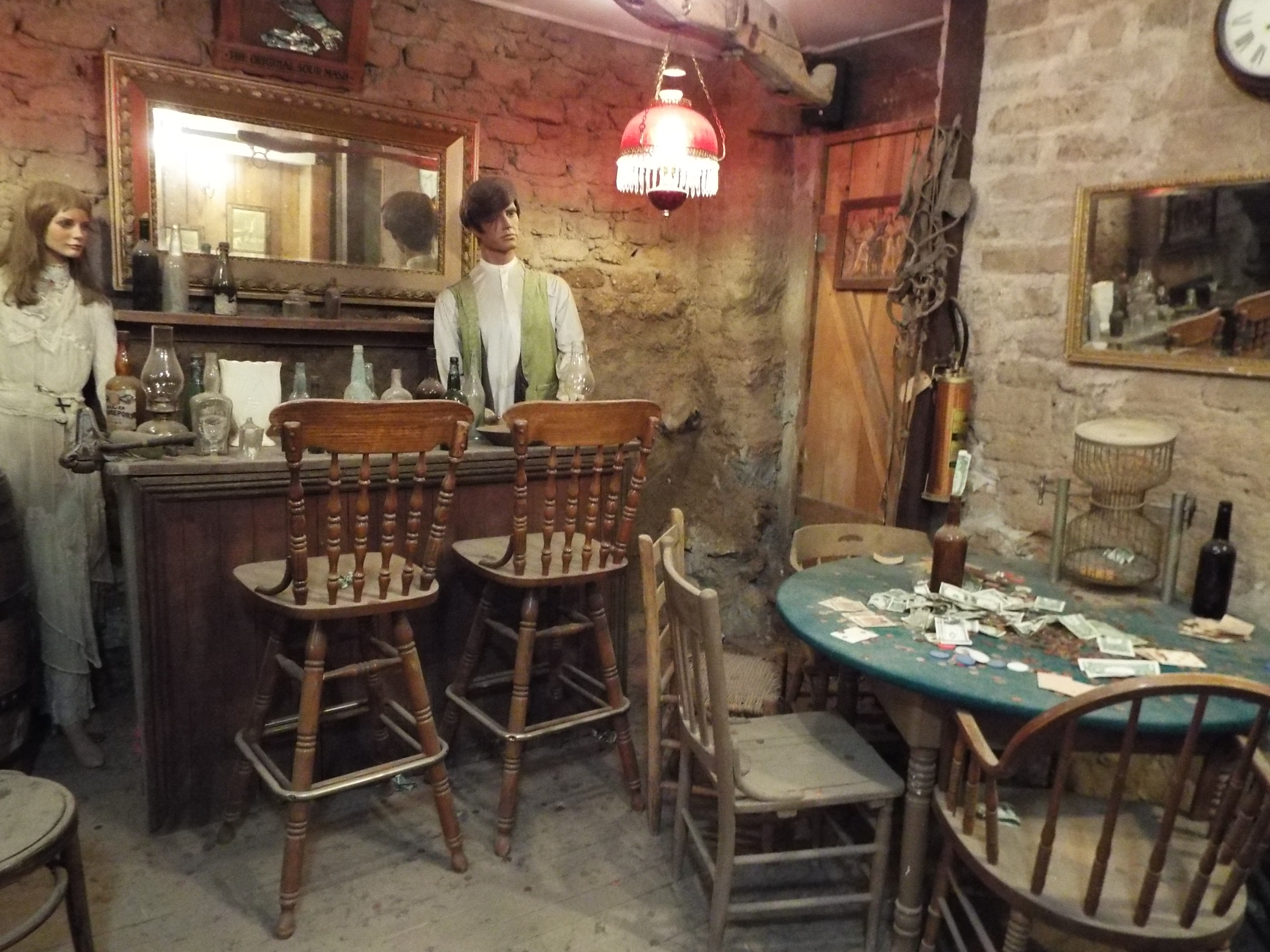
Gambling parlor in the basement of the Bird Cage Theatre

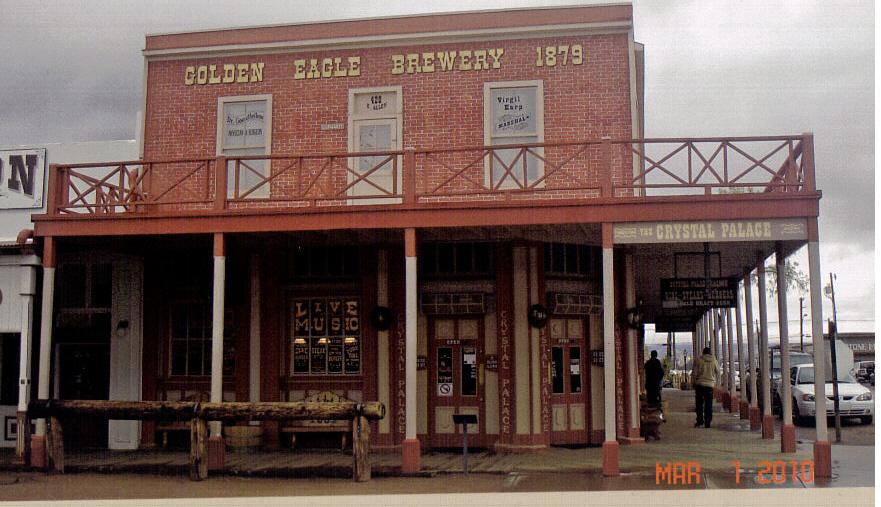
The Crystal Palace

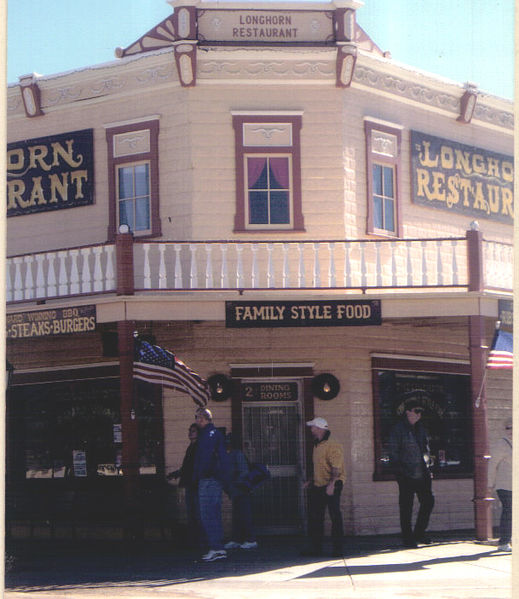
The Bucket of Blood Saloon

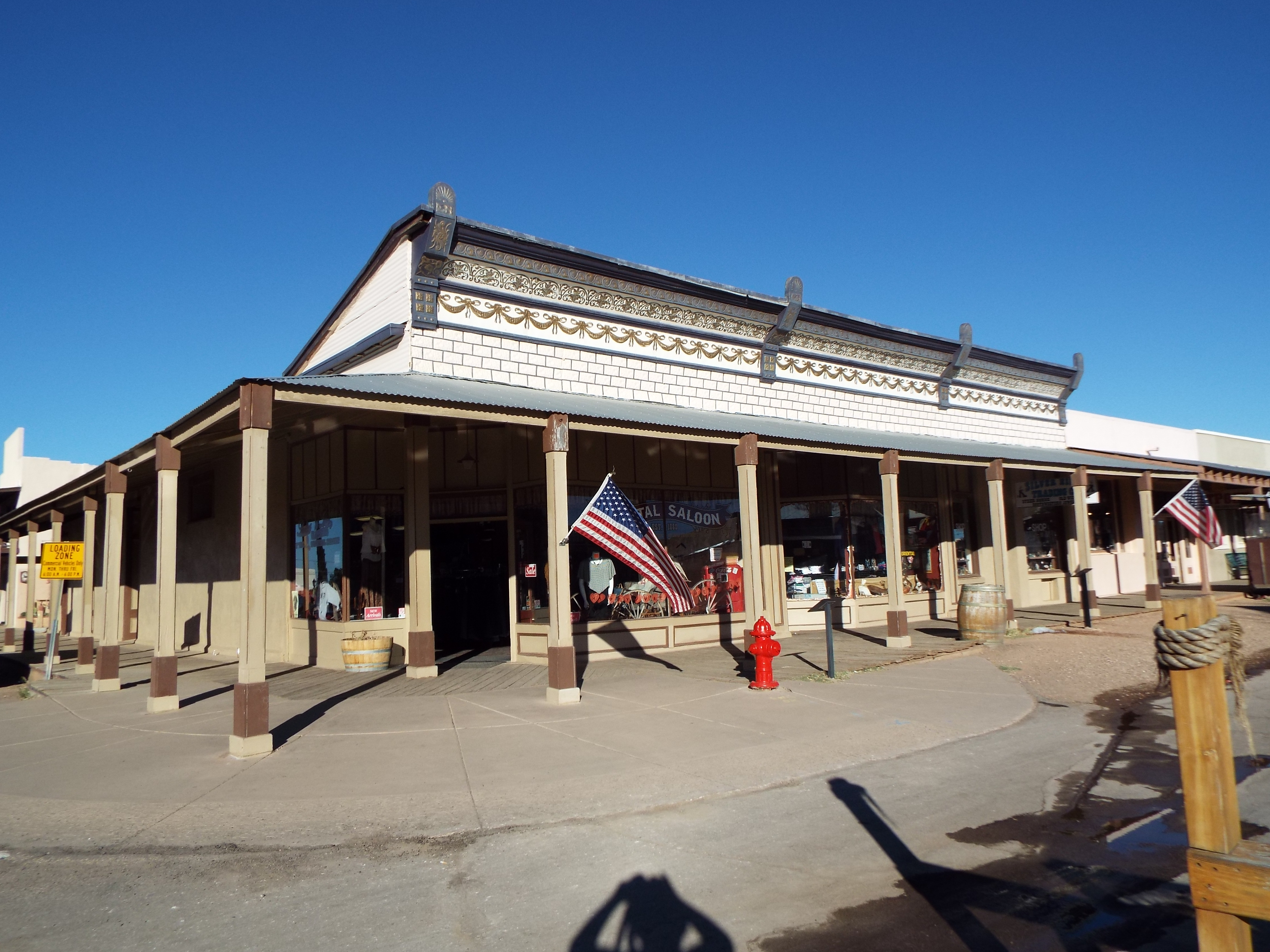
The Oriental Saloon

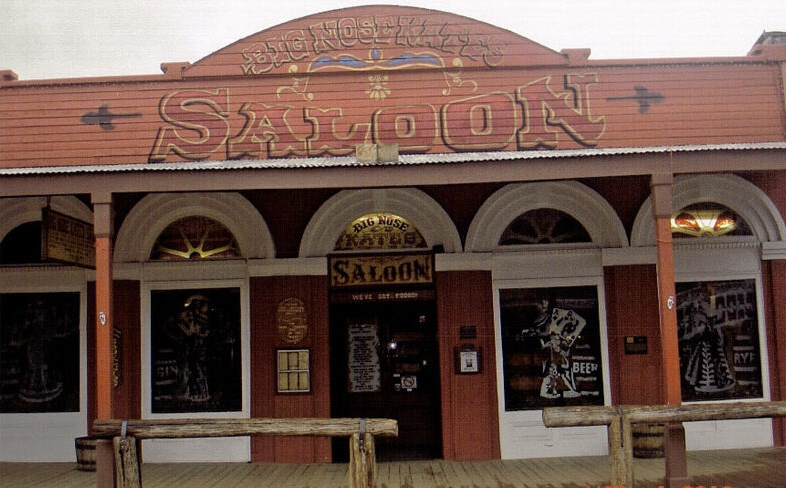
Big Nose Kate's Saloon

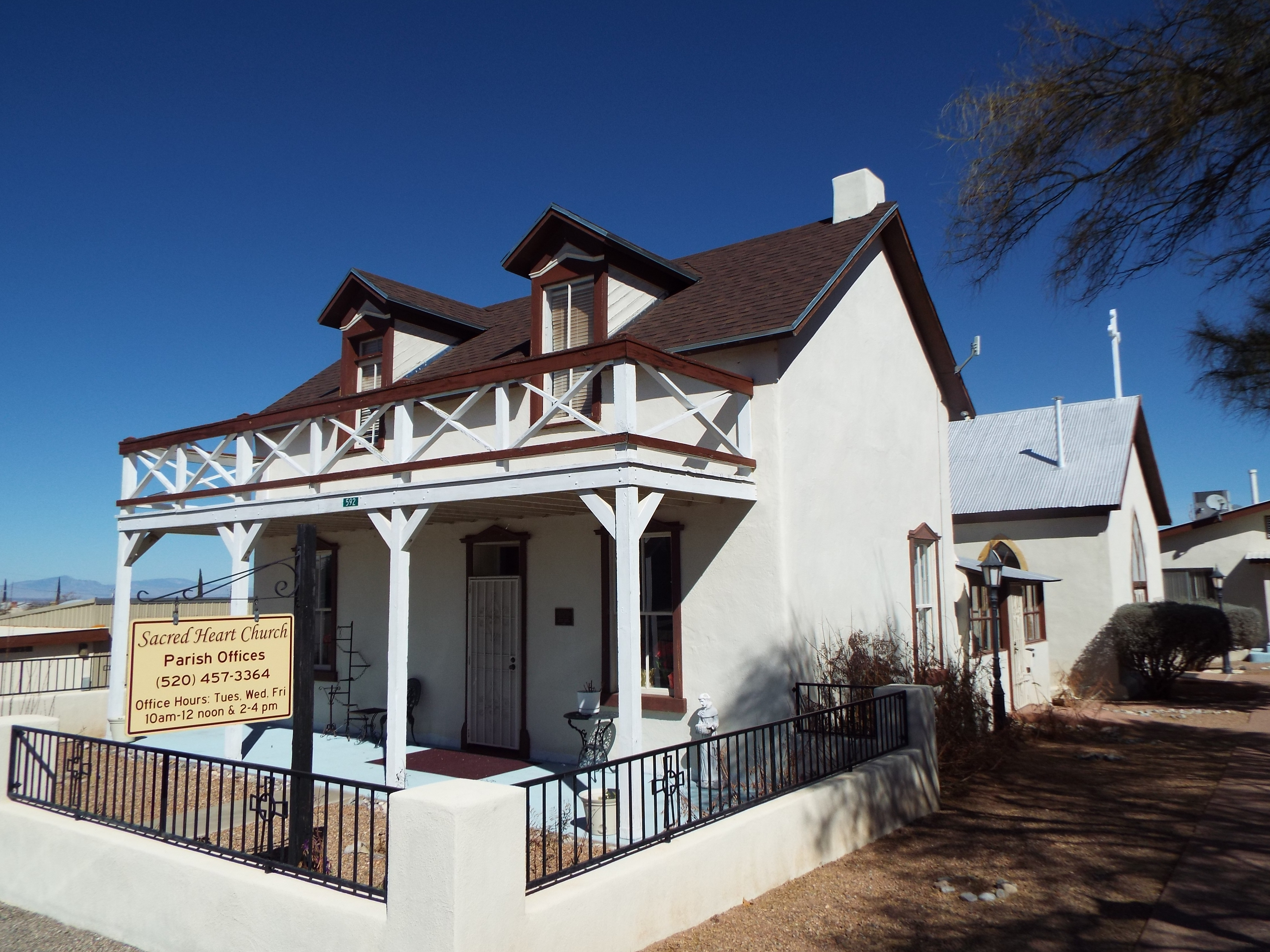
The Sacred Heart Church Parish

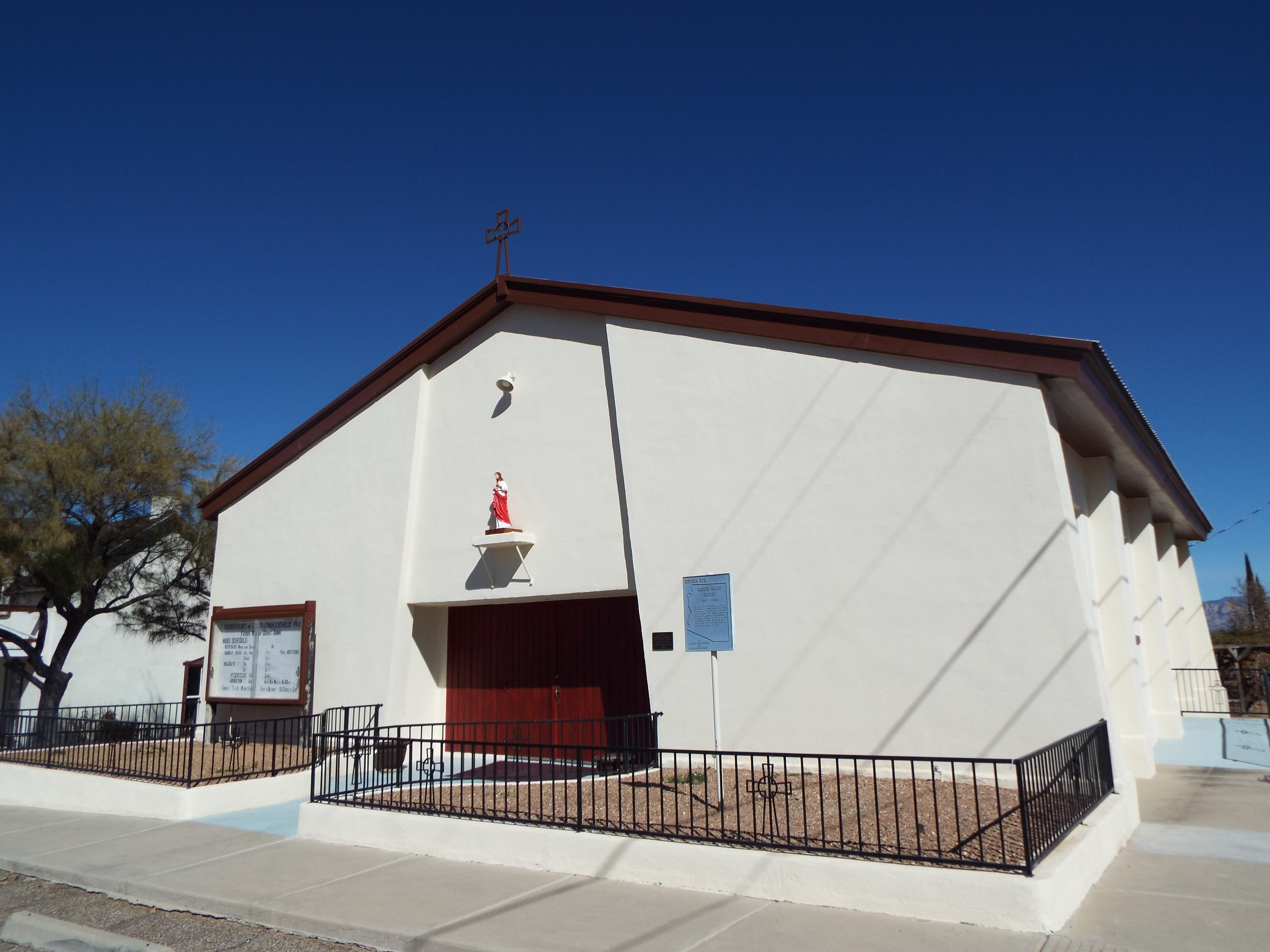
The Sacred Heart Church

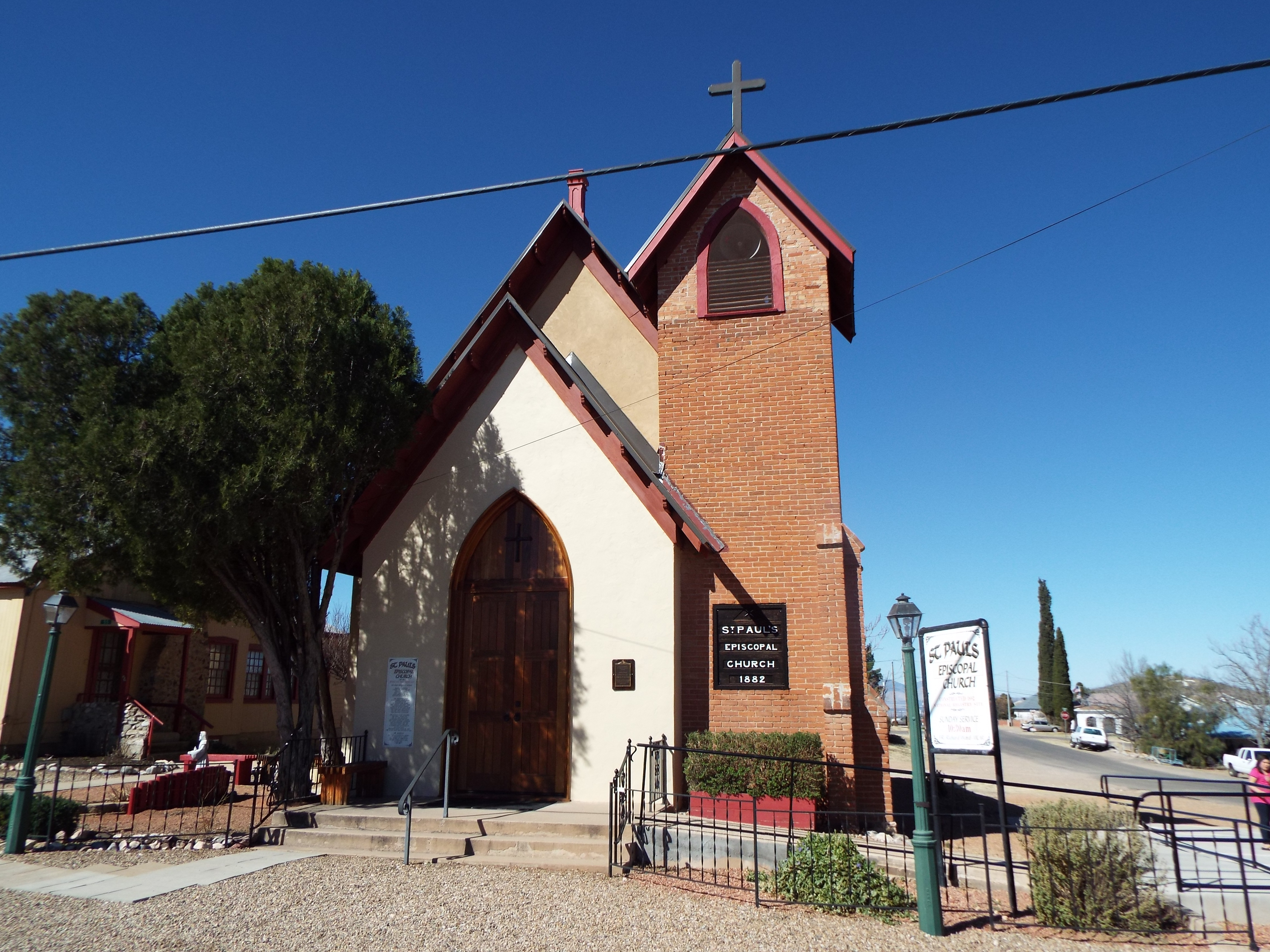
St. Paul’s Episcopal Church

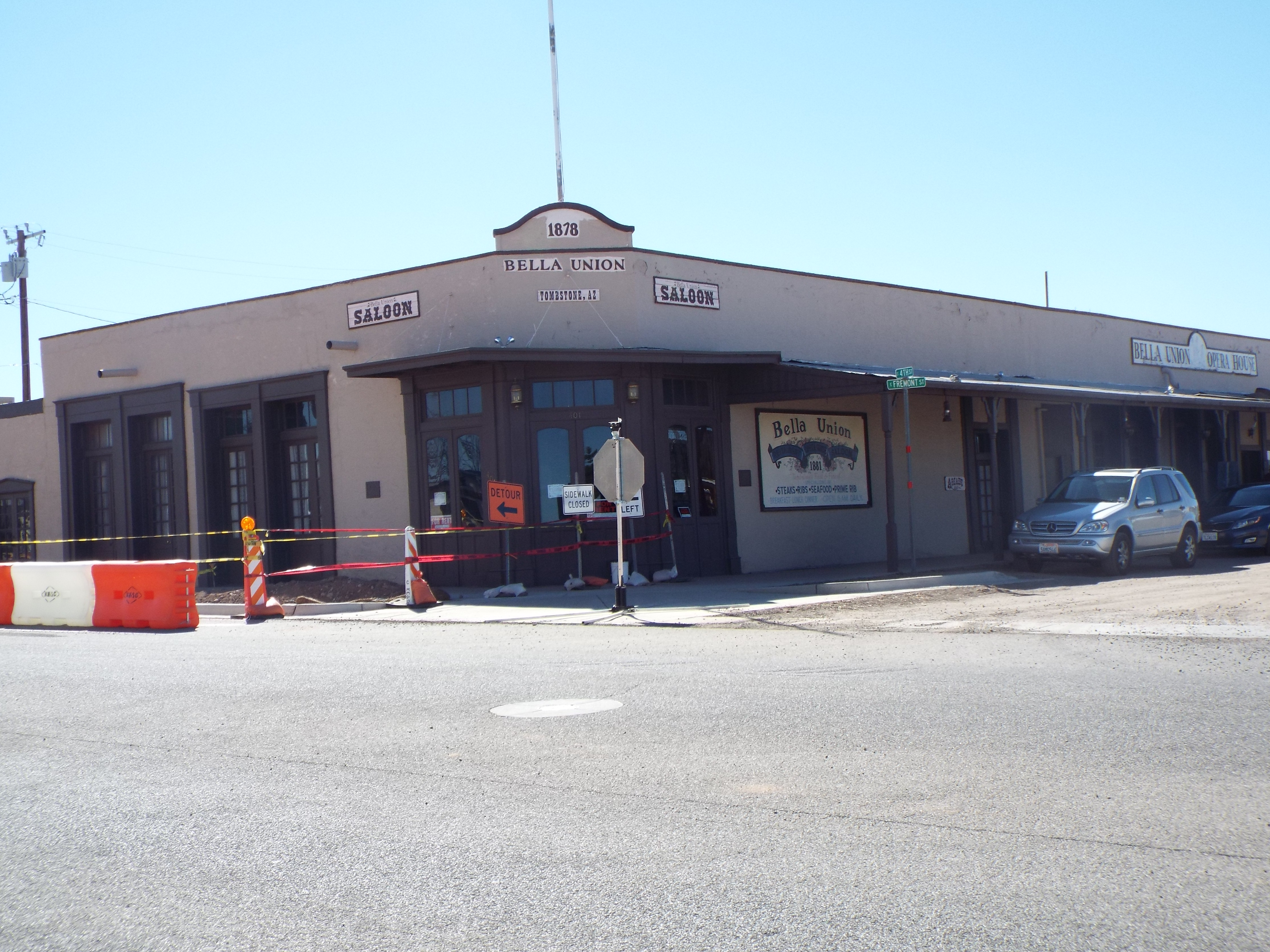
The Bella Union Saloon and Opera House

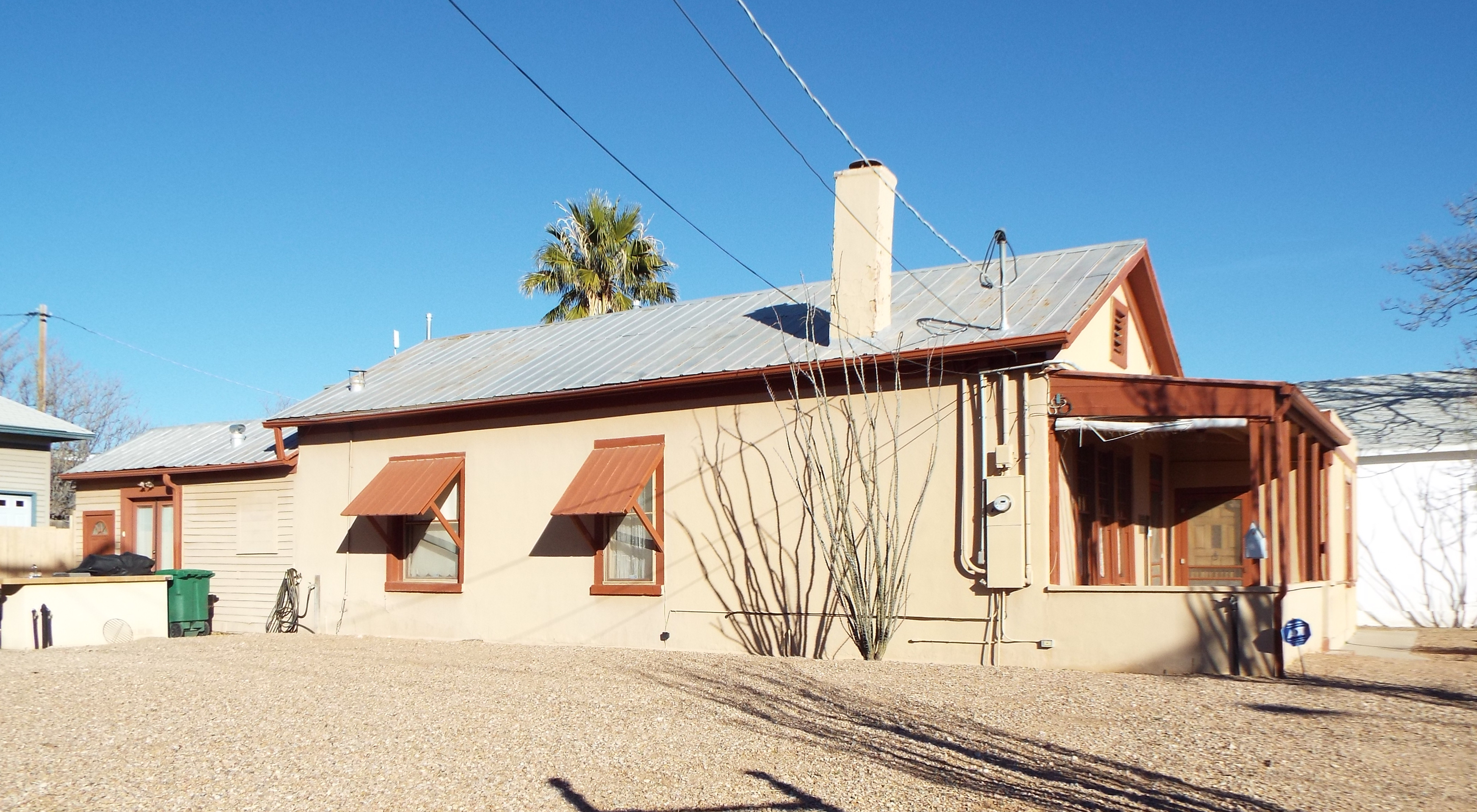
The Allen English house

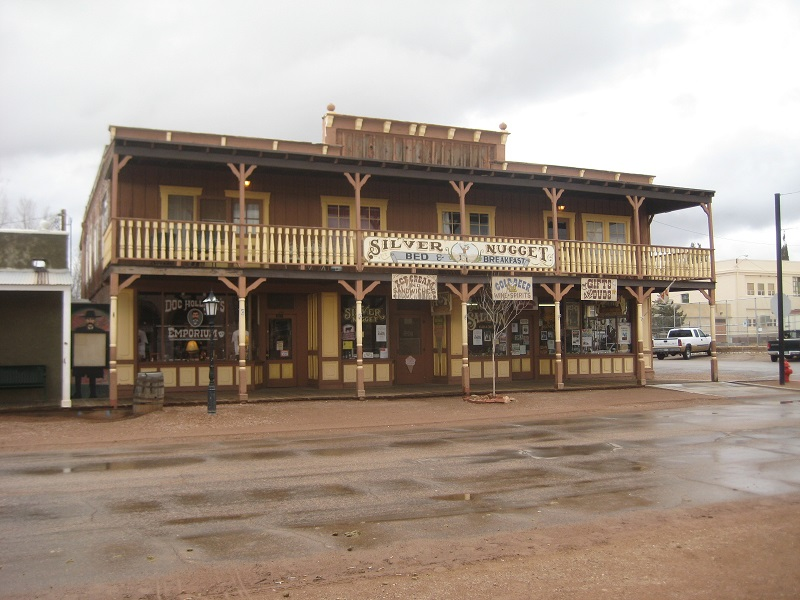
The Silver Nugget Bed and Breakfast

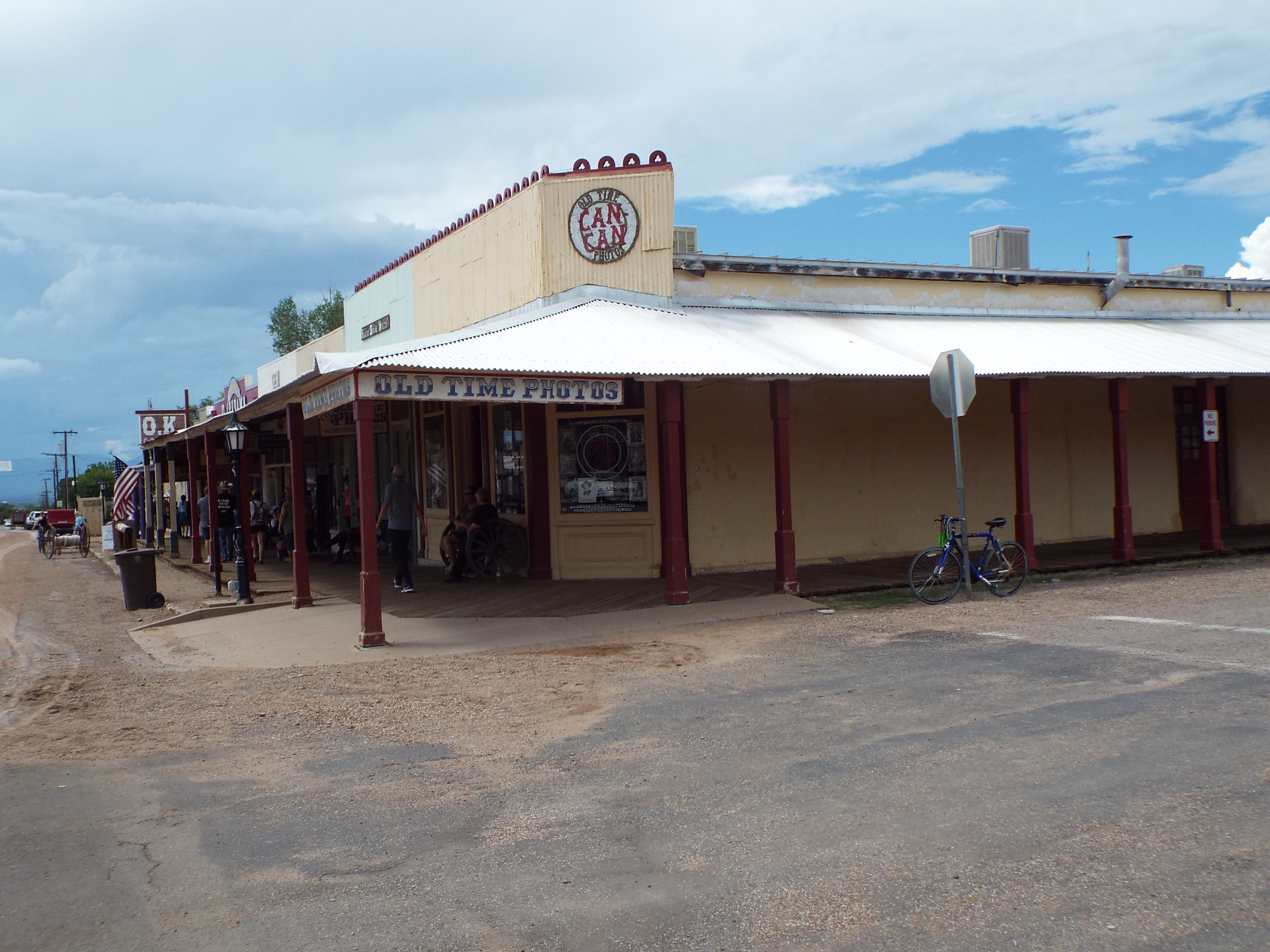
The Can Can Restaurant

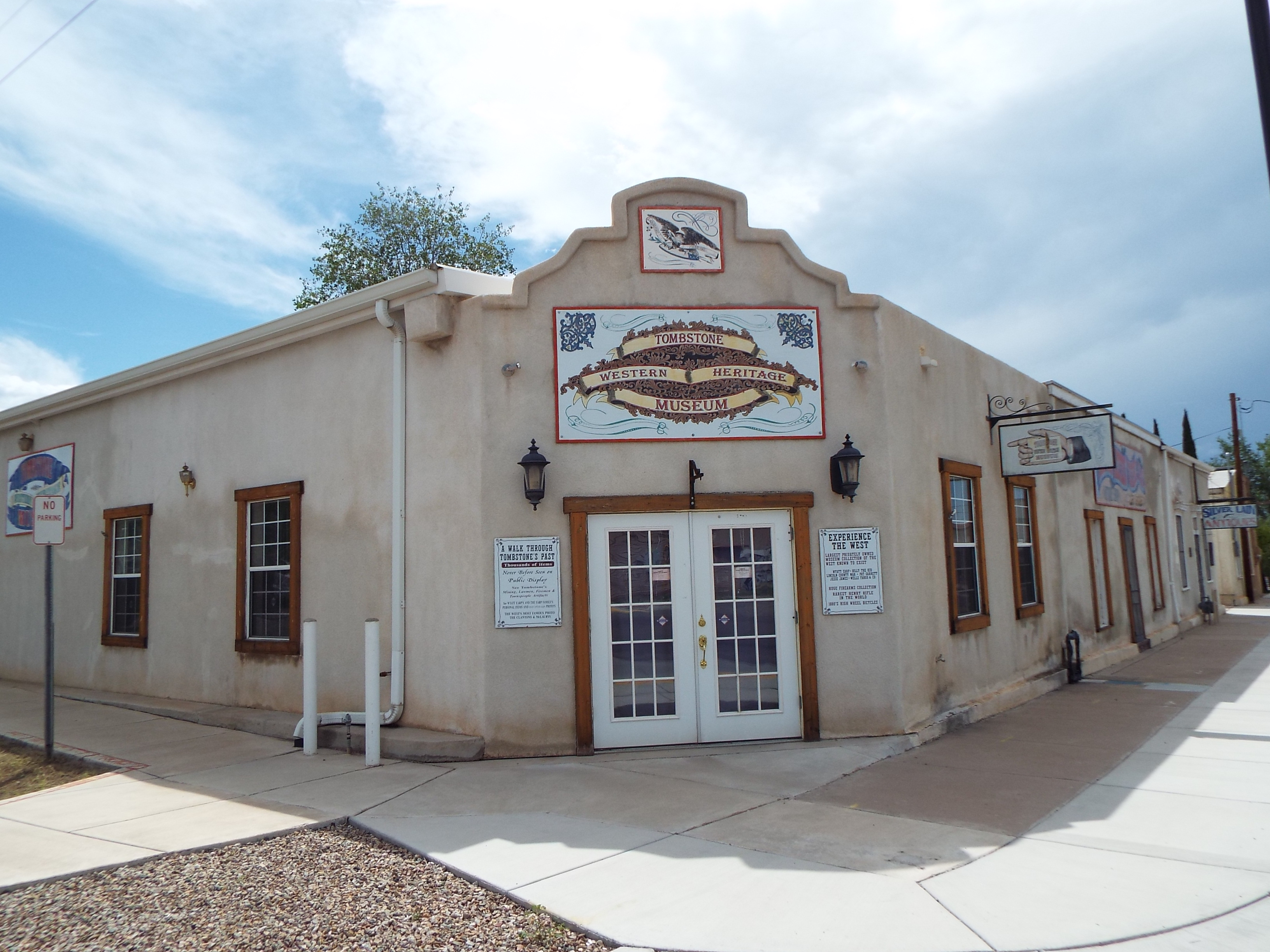
The William Herring building

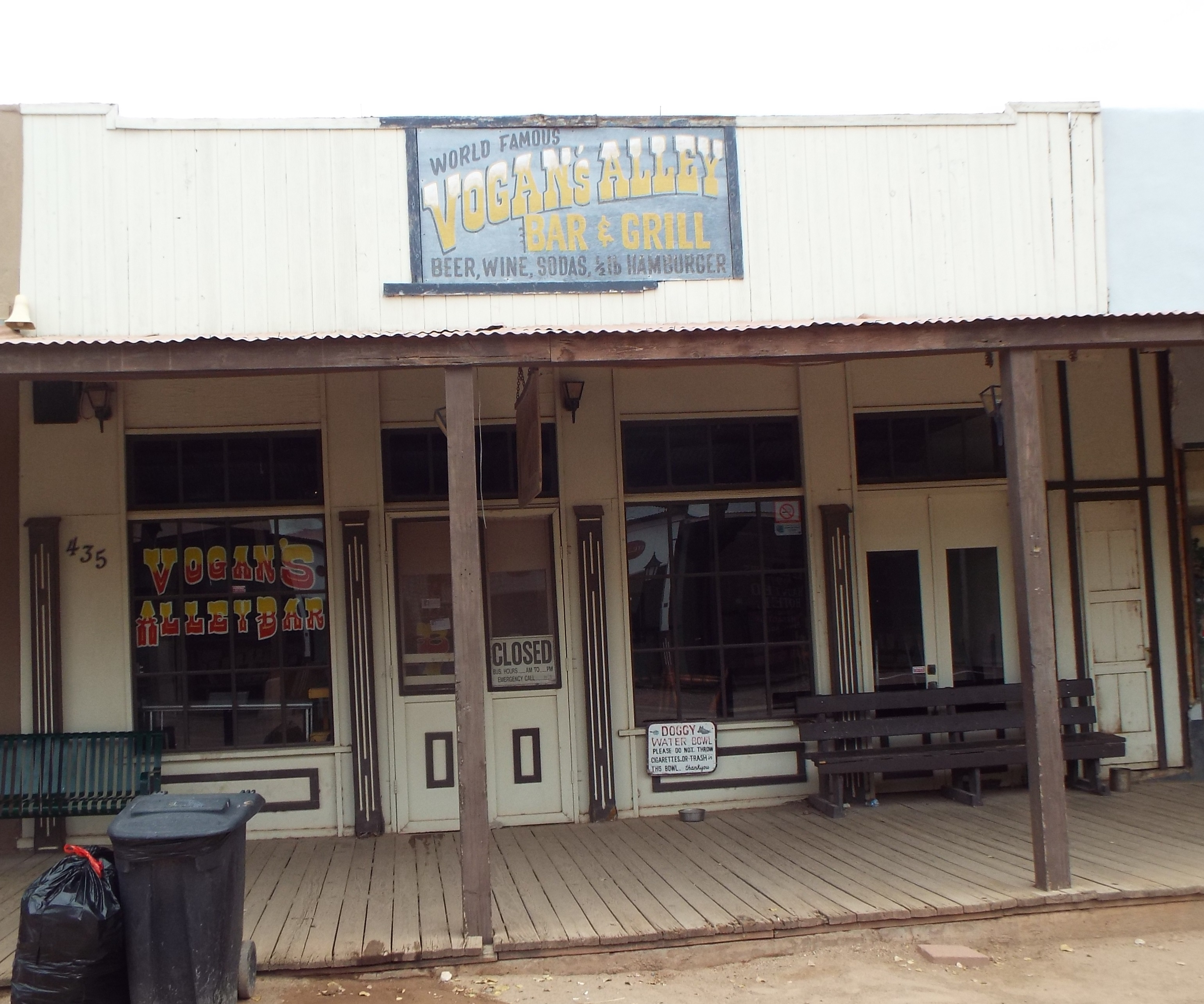
Vogan's Alley Bar and Grill

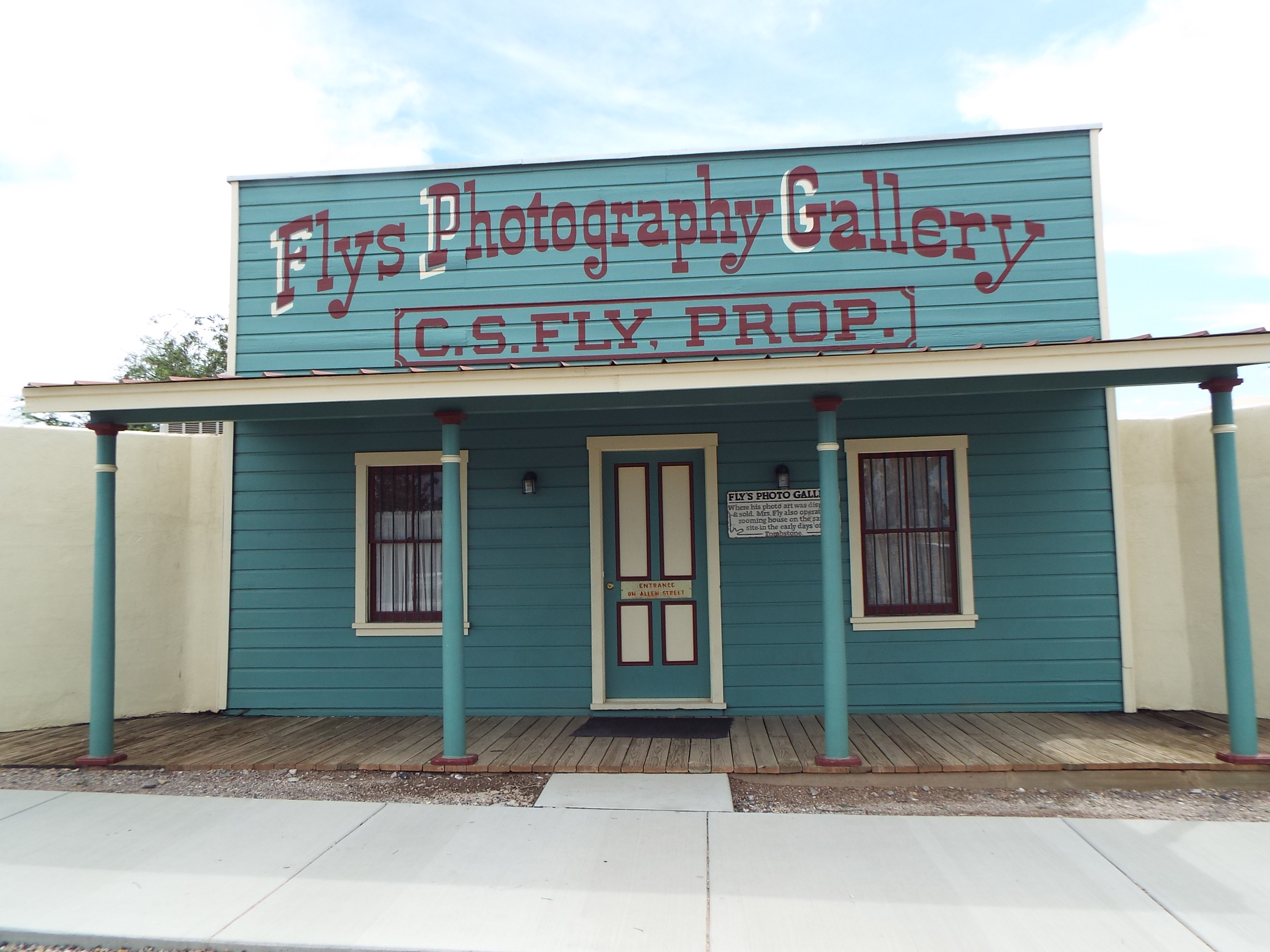
Fly's Photography Gallery

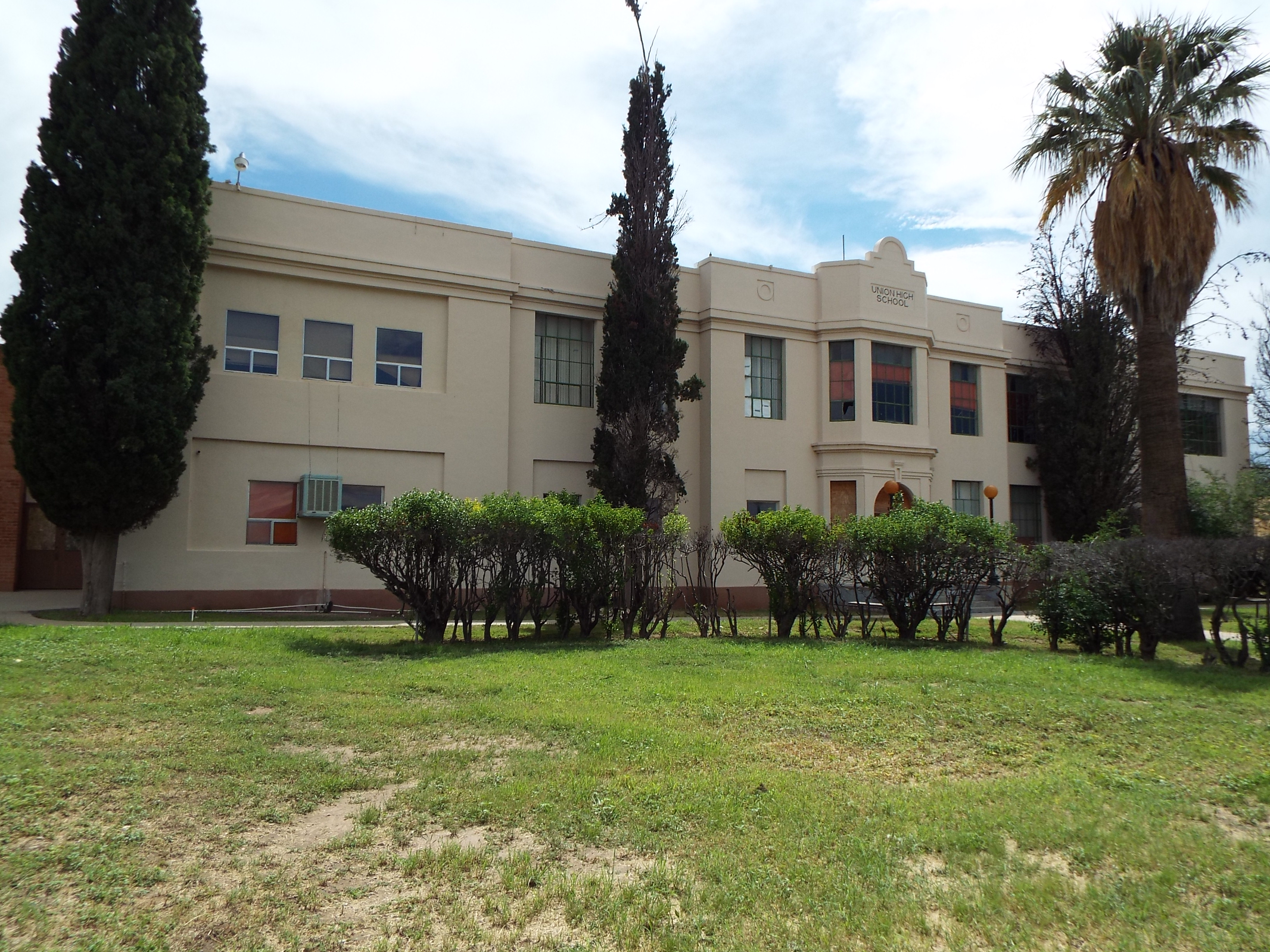
Tombstone High School

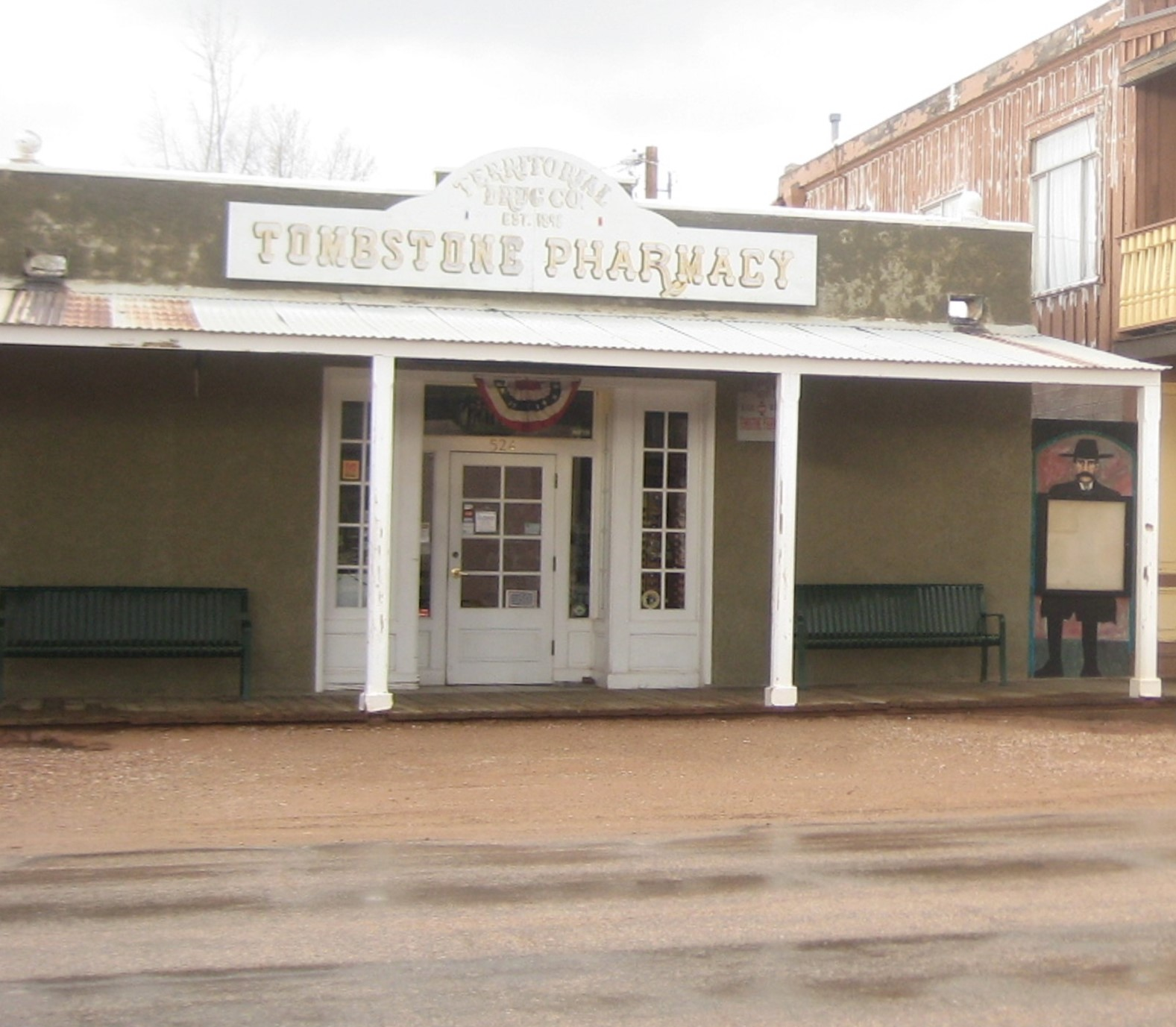
The Territorial Drug Co – Tombstone Pharmacy – 1898.

== Boot Hill Graveyard ==
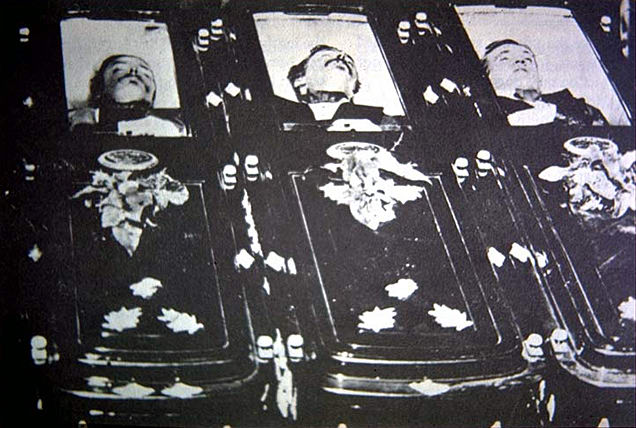
The bodies of Billy Clanton, Frank McLaury and Tom McLaury

- Boot Hill Graveyard – The graveyard was established in 1878 as the Tombstone Cemetery and is located at 408 Arizona State Route 80.
- The graves of Billy Clanton, Frank McLaury and Tom McLaury members of the Cochise County Cowboys who died in the 1881 gunfight at the O.K. Corral.
- The grave of Newman Haynes "Old Man" Clanton – Clanton was the father of the famous Clanton gang, which included Ike, and Billy Clanton. He was a notorious cattle thief who was ambushed and killed in Mexico on August 13, 1881.
- The symbolic grave of John Heath – Heath was accused of organizing the robbery in Bisbee which ended up in a massacre known as the Bisbee Massacre. Heath is not buried in Boothill Cemetery; his body was returned to his estranged wife in Terrell, Texas, and was buried there in Oakland Cemetery.
- The graves of Dan "Big Dan" Dowd, Omer W. "Red" Sample, James "Tex" Howard, William E. "Billy" Delaney and Daniel "York" Kelley, perpetrators of the Bisbee massacre, legally hanged on March 28, 1884.
- The grave of China Mary, a.k.a. Mrs Ah Lum, who died in 1906.
Historic Boot Hill Graveyard

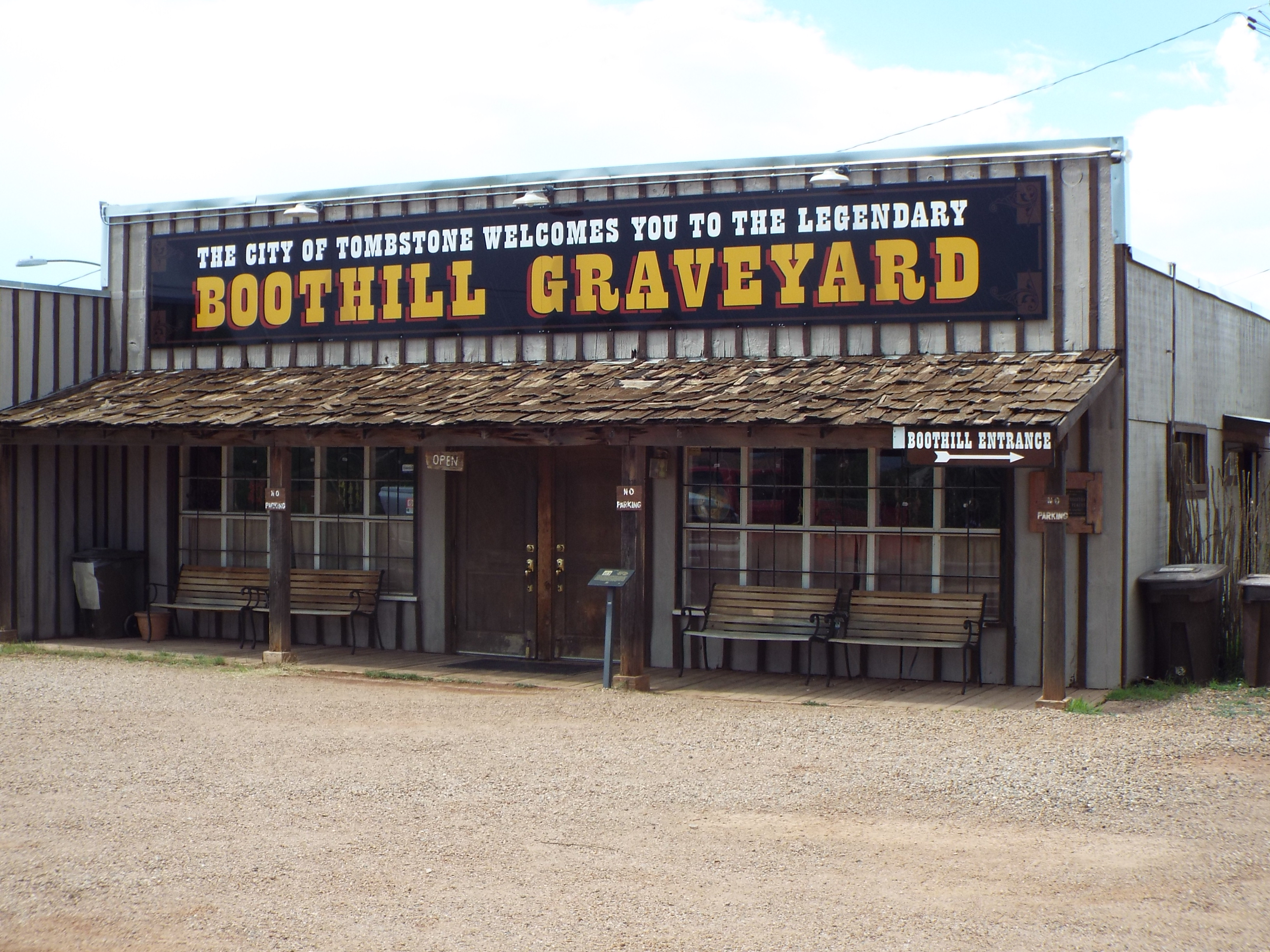
Boothill Graveyard entrance

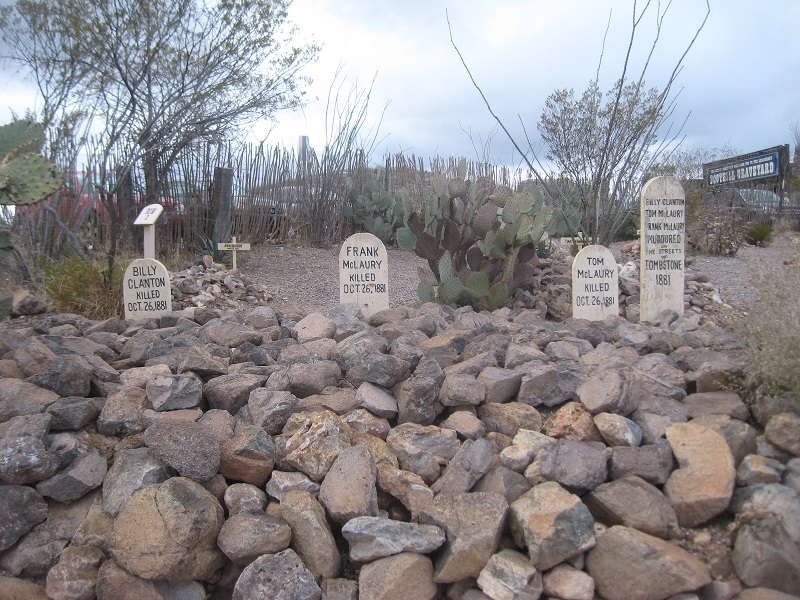
The graves of Billy Clanton, Frank McLaury and Tom McLaury

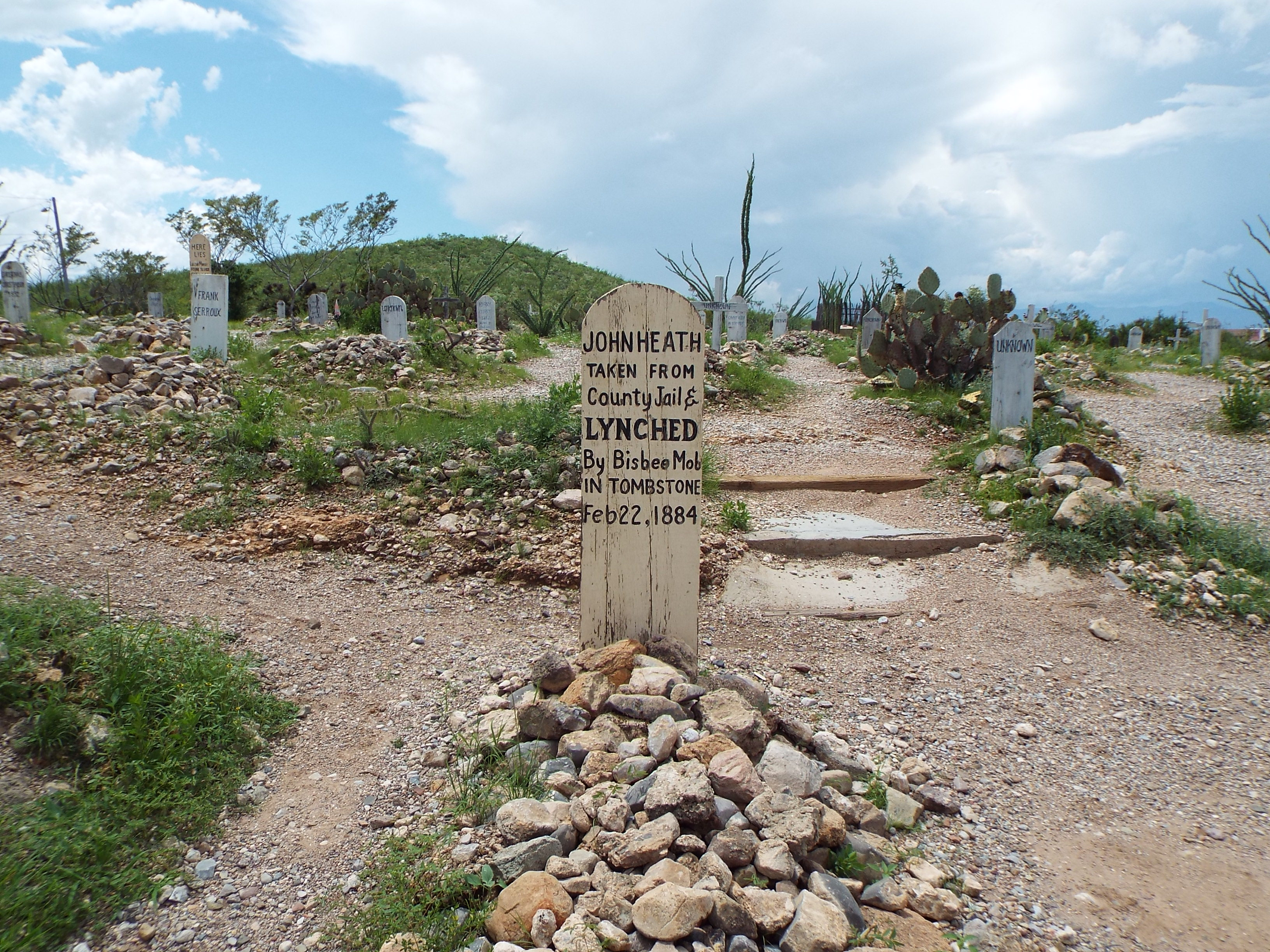
The symbolic grave of John Heath

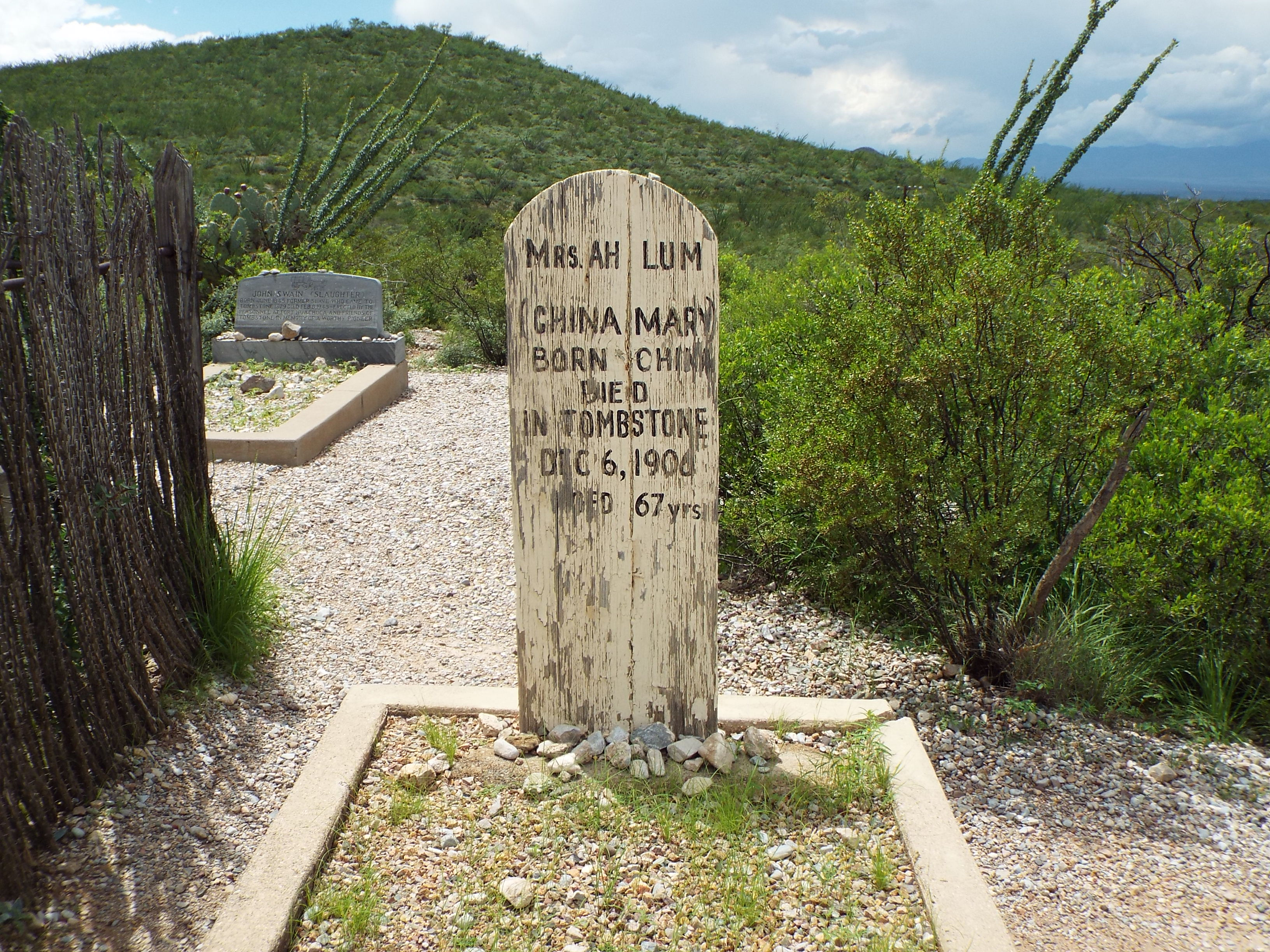
China Mary

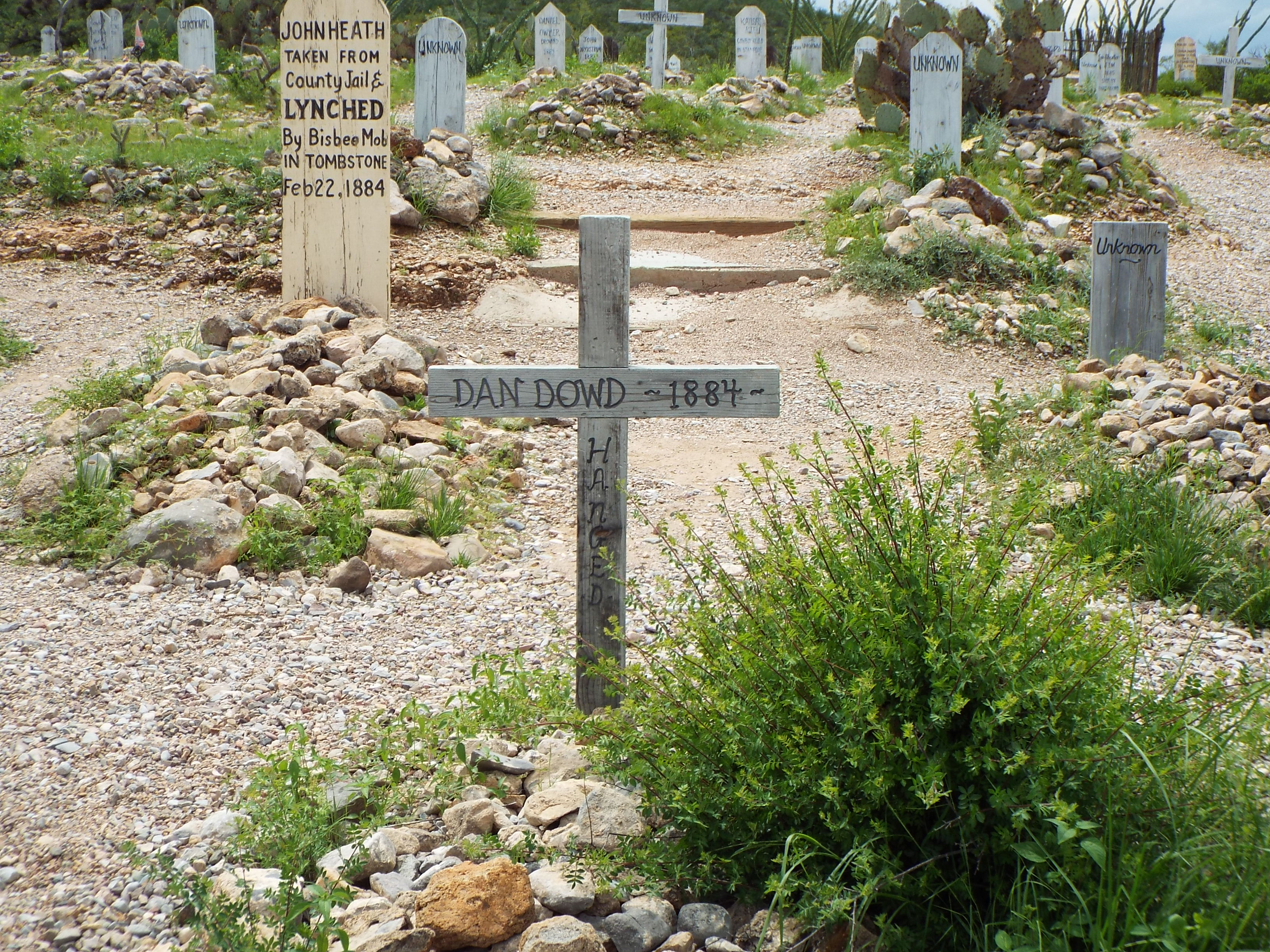
Dan "Big Dan" Dowd

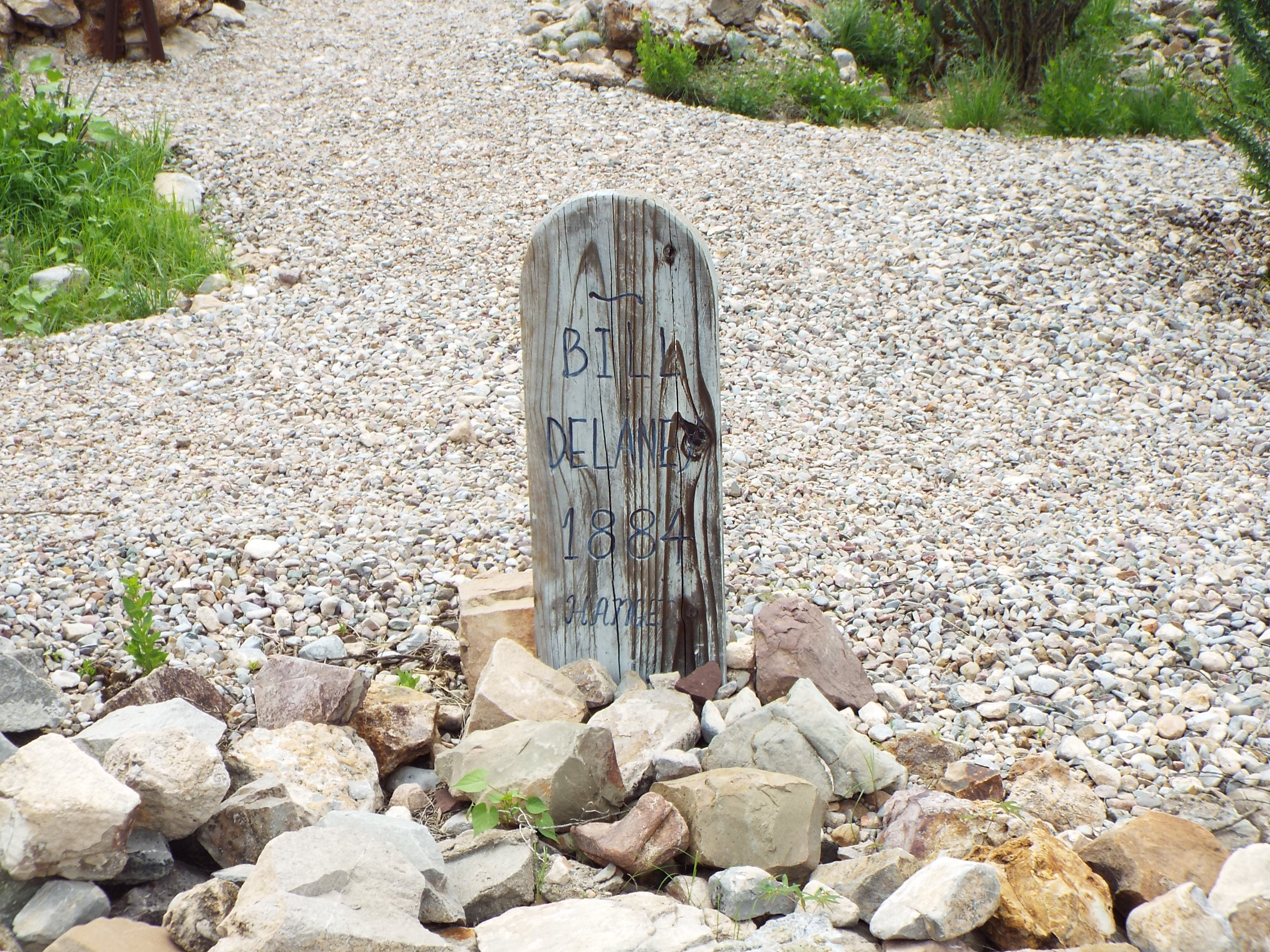
William E. "Billy" Delaney

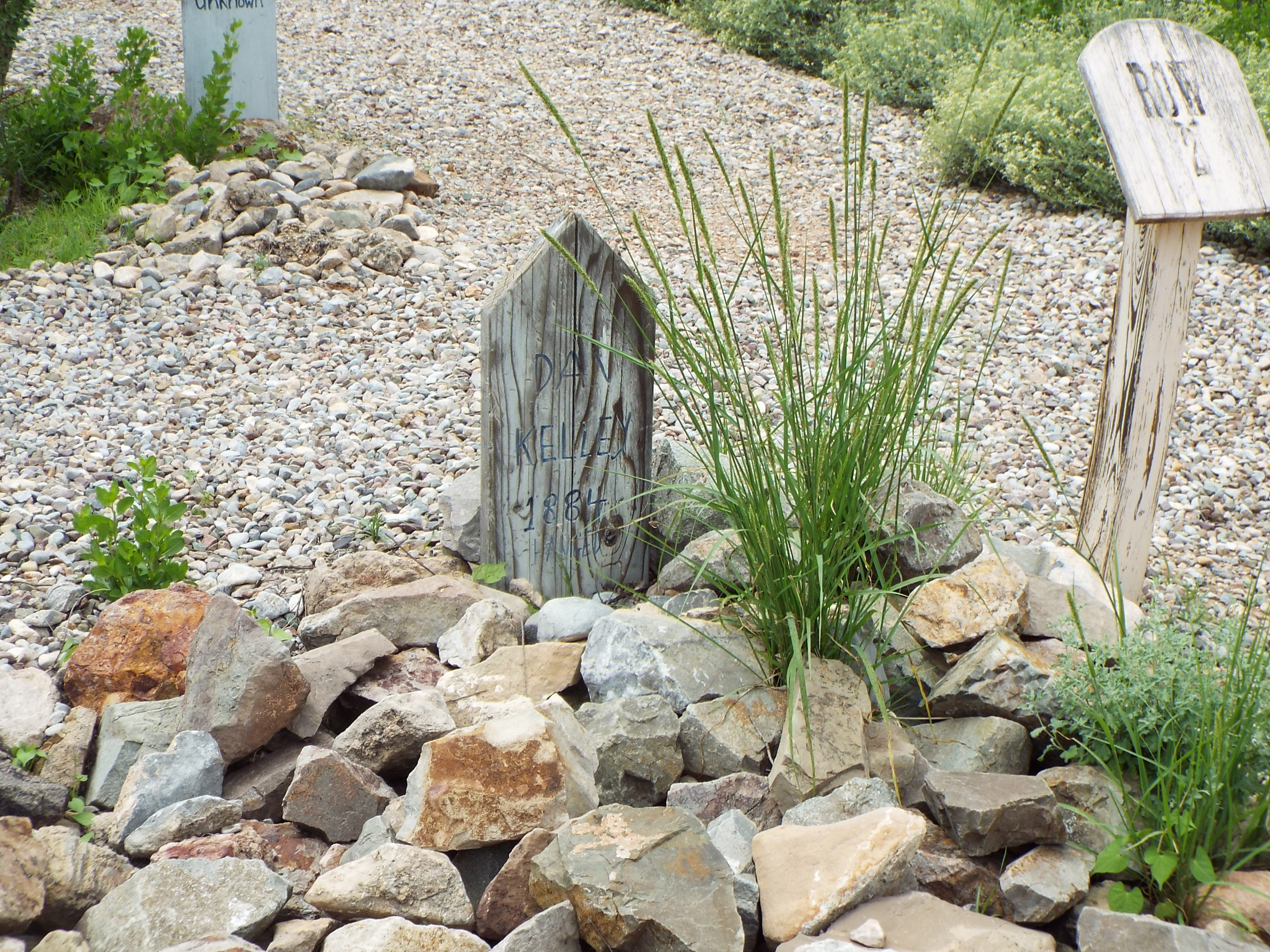
Daniel "York" Kelley

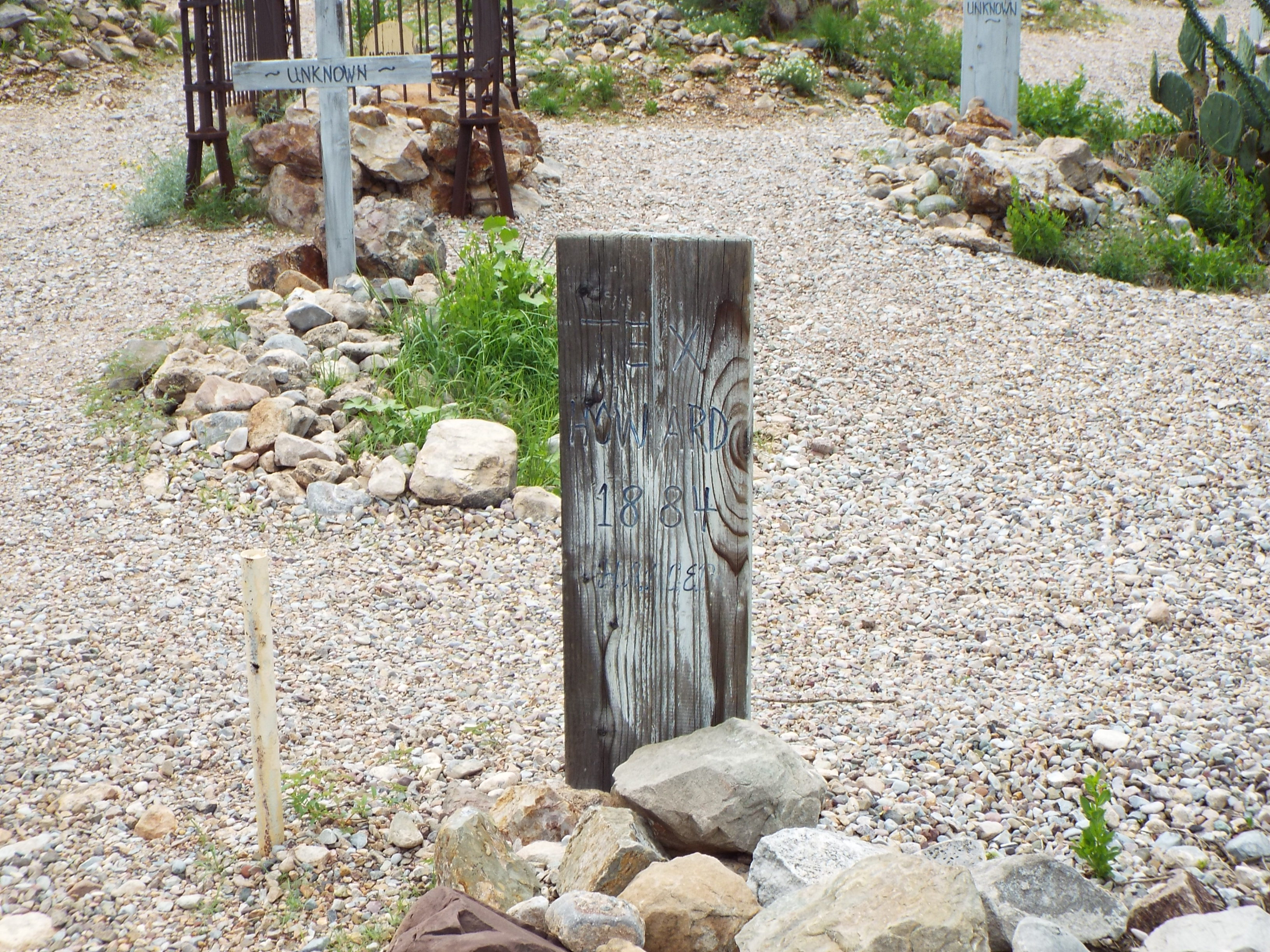
James "Tex" Howard

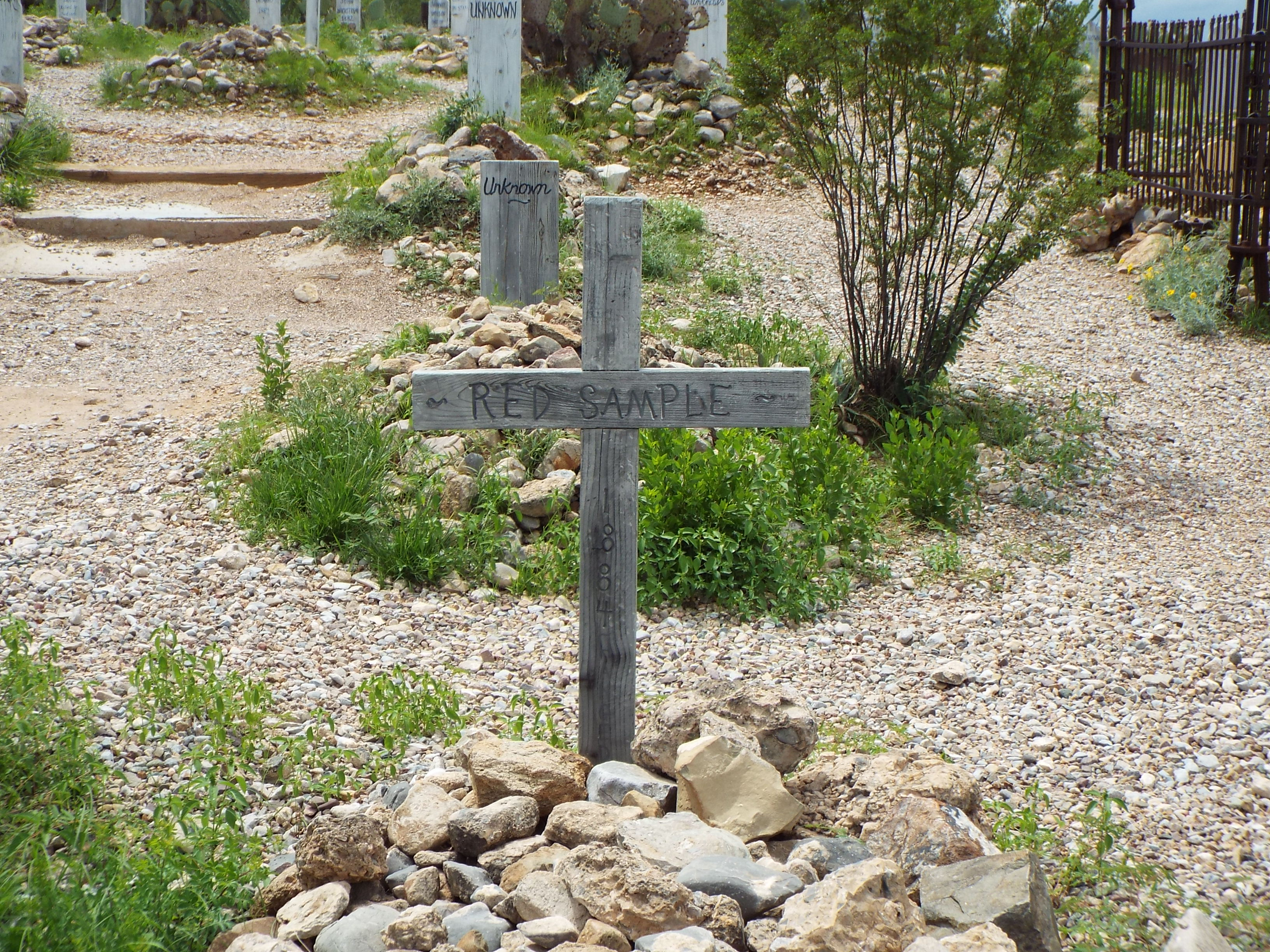
Omer W. "Red" Sample

== See also ==
- Tombstone, Arizona
- Tombstone Courthouse State Historic Park
- National Register of Historic Places listings in Cochise County, Arizona
