= Tombstone Historic District =

Historic district in Arizona, United States

- U.S. National Register of Historic Places
- U.S. National Historic Landmark District
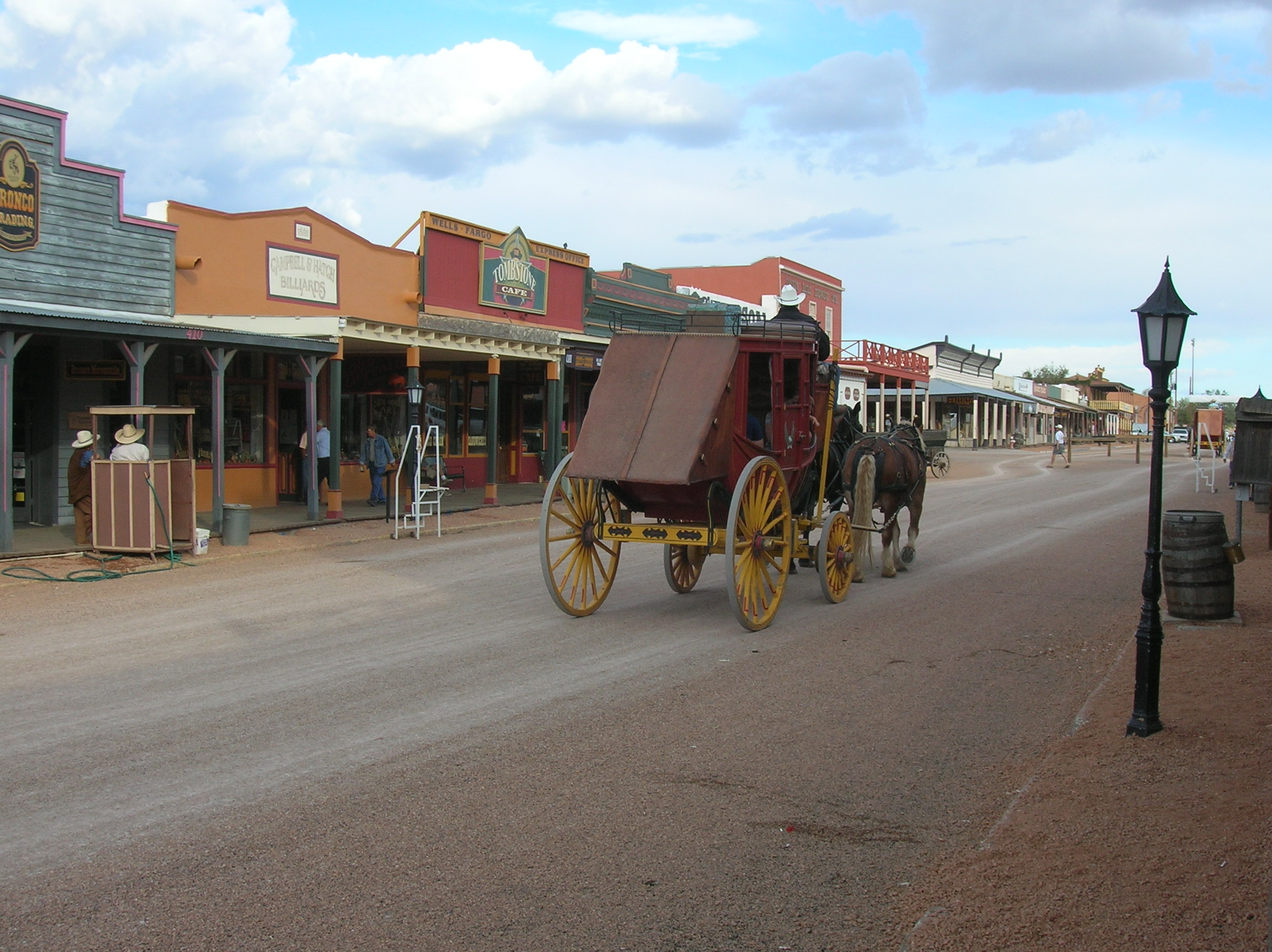
- Allen Street

- Location within Arizona Location within the United States
- Location: Tombstone, Arizona
- Coordinates: 31°42′45″N 110°3′59″W
- Area: 42 acres (17 ha)
- Built: 1877
- NRHP reference No.: 66000171

Significant dates
- Added to NRHP: October 15, 1966
- Designated NHLD: July 4, 1961

Tombstone Historic District is a historic district in Tombstone, Arizona that is significant for its association with the struggle between lawlessness and civility in frontier towns of the wild west, and for its history as a boom-and-bust mining center. Located within the historic district is the legendary O.K. Corral associated with the famous Gunfight at the O.K. Corral that actually took place on Fremont Street, near the back entrance to the O.K. Corral, on October 26, 1881. The district was declared a National Historic Landmark in 1961.

== Description ==
The Tombstone Historic District had ill-defined boundaries when it was first designated in 1961. The landmarked area was generally agreed to include at least the area bounded by Toughnut, Fremont, 3rd and 6th Streets, but its precise limits were a subject of continuing debate through at least 1986. The district covers about 42 acres (17 ha) of downtown Tombstone, and is anchored at its southwestern corner by the former Cochise County Courthouse, now the centerpiece of Tombstone Courthouse State Historic Park.

Buildings in the district typically have an appearance (either original or restored) to the town's early mining boom period of the 1880s. Although mining began in the area in the 1870s, fires in 1881 and 1882 destroyed most of its central business district. Significant among the buildings constructed after those fires are the 1882 City Hall, the 1881 Schieffelin Hall, a large performance venue built out of adobe, and the 1881 Bird Cage Theatre, a theater and playhouse which also housed a brothel.

== See also ==
- List of National Historic Landmarks in Arizona
- National Register of Historic Places listings in Cochise County, Arizona
