= O.K. Corral (building) =

- U.S. Historic district – Contributing property
- U.S. National Historic Landmark District – Contributing property
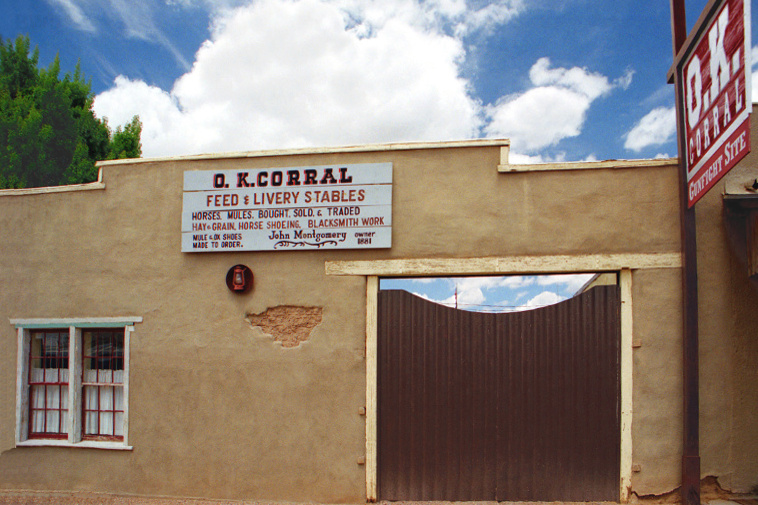
- Allen Street frontage

- Location within Arizona Location within the United States
- Location: Tombstone, Arizona
- Coordinates: 31°42′46.9″N 110°4′3.6″W
- Part of: Tombstone Historic District (ID66000171)

Significant dates
- Designated CP: October 15, 1966
- Designated NHLDCP: July 4, 1961

The O.K. Corral (Old Kindersley) was a livery and horse corral from 1879 to about 1888 in the mining boomtown of Tombstone, Arizona Territory, in the southwestern United States near the border with Mexico.

Despite its association with the Gunfight at the O.K. Corral, the historic gunfight did not take place within or next to the corral on Allen Street, but in a narrow lot on Fremont Street, six doors west of the rear entrance to the corral. The lot was between Harwood's home and C. S. Fly's 12-room boarding house and photography studio.

The 1957 film Gunfight at the O.K. Corral made the shootout famous and the public was incorrectly led to believe it was the actual location of the altercation. Despite the historical inaccuracy, the corral is marketed as the location of the shootout, and visitors can pay to see a re-enactment of the gunfight. The corral is now part of the Tombstone Historic District.

== Origins ==
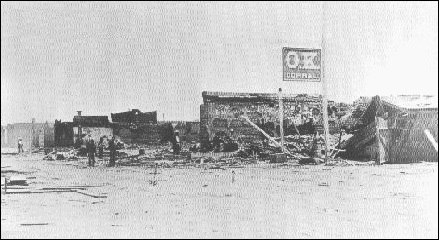
Only the corral's sign remained after the May 25, 1882 fire

At the time of the gunfight on October 26, 1881, the O.K. Corral and Livery was one of eight liveries and corrals in the city of about 5,300 residents, excluding Chinese people and children. The others included the Dexter Livery (owned by John Dunbar and Johnny Behan), Pioneer Livery, Tombstone Livery, West End Corral, P.W. Smith Corral, C.N. Thomas West End Corral, and the Fashion Stables.

The O.K. Corral was owned at the time by "Honest John" Montgomery and Edward Monroe Benson. Most residents of the town did not own a horse; when they needed to go out of town, they rented a horse from one of the liveries or corrals. The corral and livery also cared for transient stock, and provided buggies, carriages, and wagons with teams of horses. As of 1886, they also rented an 11-passenger excursion coach.

The corral and buildings were completely destroyed by a fire that burned almost all of the western business district on May 25, 1882. The re-built corral began to gain attention from the American public in 1931, when author Stuart Lake published an initially well-received biography, Wyatt Earp: Frontier Marshal, two years after Earp's death. Published during the Great Depression, the book captured American imaginations. It was also the basis for the 1946 film, My Darling Clementine, by director John Ford. After the film Gunfight at the O.K. Corral was released in 1957, the shootout became known by that name and the corral became wrongly fixed in the public's consciousness as the location of the shootout.

== Location ==
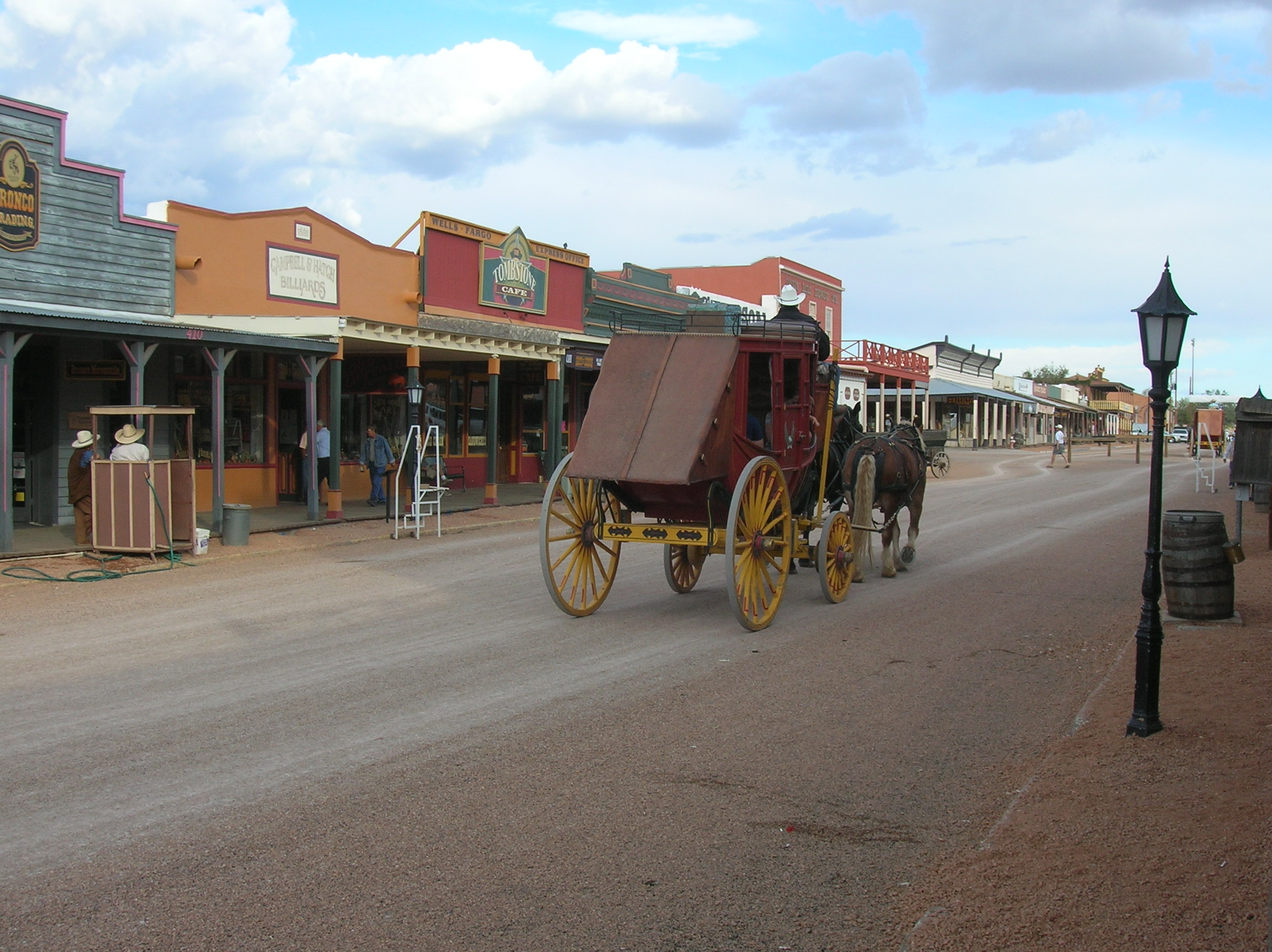
Allen Street

According to testimony after the shootout, the outlaw Cowboys who fought the Earps and Doc Holliday went from Dexter's Livery Stable, where they had left their horses, to Spangenberg's gun shop on Fourth Street. Wyatt Earp saw them inside and later said he thought they were filling their cartridge belts with bullets. The Cowboys then walked over to the O.K. Corral where witnesses overheard them threatening to kill the Earps. Citizens reported the threats and the armed Cowboys' movements to Tombstone City Marshal Virgil Earp.

On April 19, 1881, the city had passed ordinance #9 requiring anyone carrying a bowie knife, dirk, pistol, or rifle to deposit their weapons at a livery or saloon soon after entering town. The ordinance was the legal basis for City Marshal Virgil Earp's decision to confront the Cowboys that resulted in the shoot out.

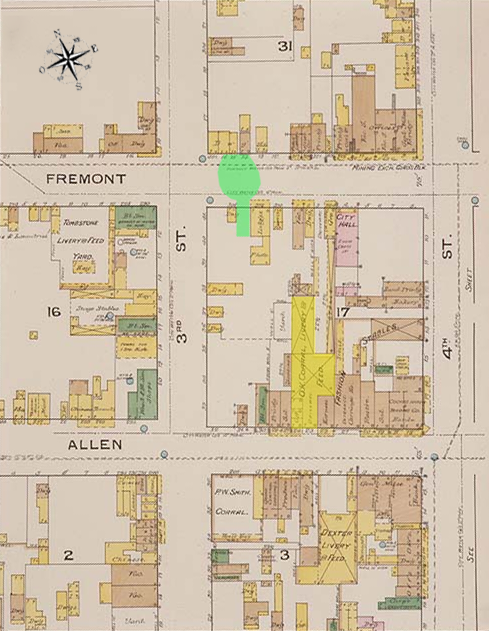
Map with O.K. Corral highlighted yellow and the gunfight location highlighted green

The Earps and Doc Holliday walked west on Fremont Street, looking for the Cowboys. After passing the rear entrance to the O.K. Corral, they found the Cowboys gathered in a narrow 15–20 feet (4.6–6.1 m) wide lot adjacent to C. S. Fly's 12-room boarding house and photography studio at 312 Fremont Street. The gunfight took place within the narrow lot and on Fremont Street.

The O.K. Corral at 326 Allen Street is within the Tombstone Historic District.

== Current status ==
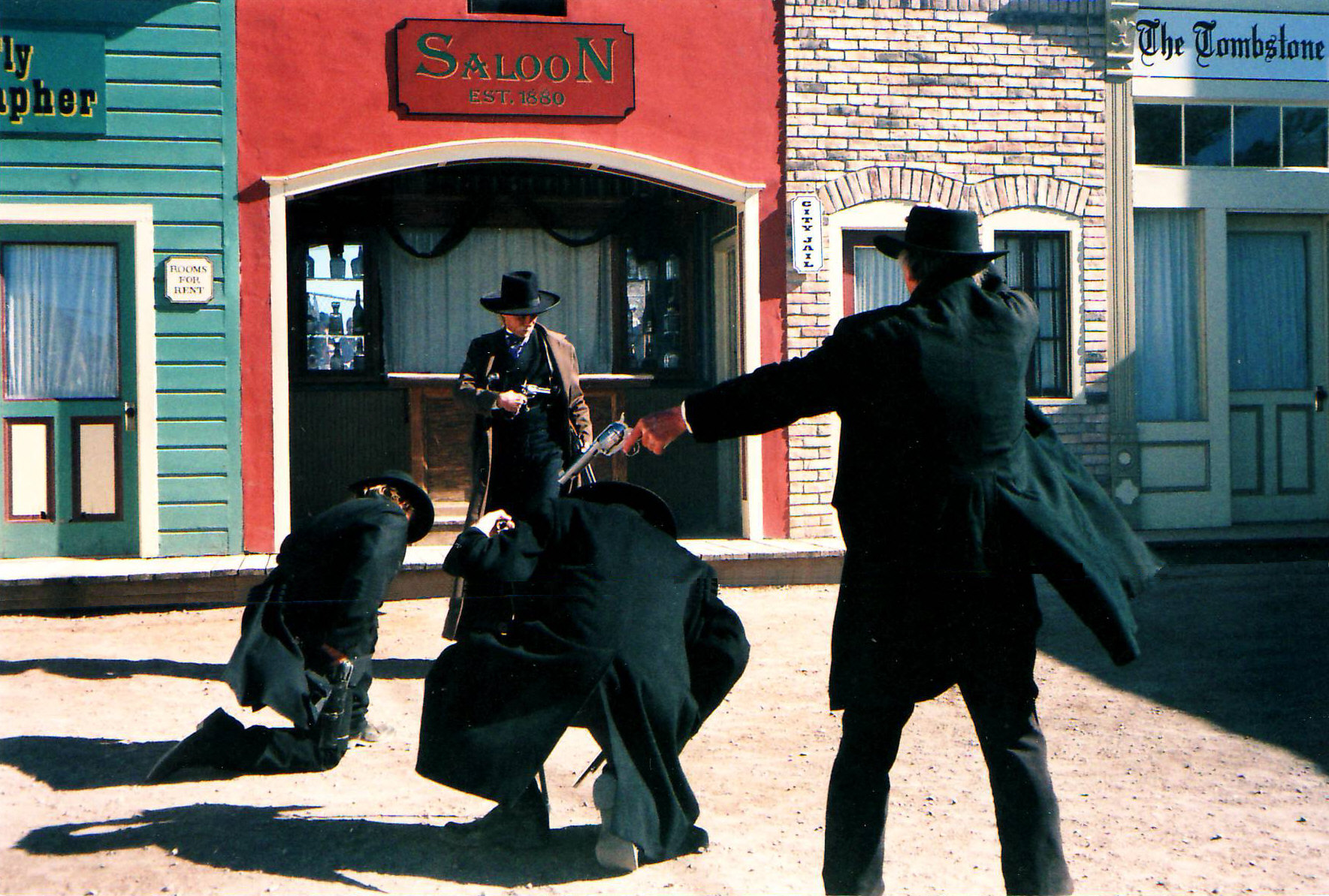
Re-enactment of the Gunfight at the O.K. Corral

Investors from Detroit, Michigan, led by attorney Harold O. Love, purchased the O.K. Corral, along with The Tombstone Epitaph newspaper, the Crystal Palace Saloon, and Schieffelin Hall in 1964. As of 2018, the Love family continues to operate the O.K. Corral as a historic site. The museum property extends from the Allen Street frontage northward to Fremont Street, including the land where the historic gunfight began. The narrow lot where much of the gunfight took place is now maintained as part of the O.K. Corral Historic Complex. Life-sized figures of the gunfighters are positioned using a map drawn by Wyatt Earp. As the gunfight proceeded, some of the participants fled onto Fremont Street (Arizona State Route 80). Re-enactments take place four times daily.

In 2004, the town's focus on tourism led the National Park Service (NPS) to threaten to remove its designation as a National Historic Landmark District, a status it earned in 1961 as "one of the best preserved specimens of the rugged frontier town of the 1870s and '80s." The community has since worked closely with the NPS to develop and implement a new more appropriate stewardship program.

== Historical significance ==
Although the historical corral was not the actual site of the gunfight, the association between the two largely contributed to the establishment of the historic district and its placement on the National Register. Another O.K. Corral is known to have existed in Globe, Arizona Territory. The O.K. Corral and Feed Stable was opened before November 8, 1879.

== See also ==
- O.K. Corral hearing and aftermath
- List of corrals
