= John Heath =

John Heath may refer to:

== Politics ==
- John Heath, English member of parliament for Clitheroe, 1661–1679
- John Duke (Honiton MP) (born John Heath, 1717–1775), English member of parliament, 1747–1754, 1761–1768
- John Heath (Virginia politician) (1758–1810), United States representative from Virginia
- John S. Heath (1807–1849), American physician and politician in Michigan
- John Hethe, English member of parliament for Salisbury in 1388

== Sport ==
- John Heath (cricketer, born 1807) (1807–1878), English cricketer
- John Heath (cricketer, born 1891) (1891–1972), English cricketer
- John Heath (racing driver) (1914–1955), English racing driver; see List of driver deaths in motorsport
- John Heath (footballer) (1936–2019), English footballer
- John Heath (cricketer, born 1978), English cricketer

== Others ==
- John Heath (epigrammatist) (fl. 1600–1615), English epigrammatist
- John Heath (judge) (1736–1816), English judge
- John Benjamin Heath (1790–1879), governor of the Bank of England
- John Heath, U.S. Marine Corps officer who duelled with Oliver Hazard Perry in 1817
- John Heath (1855–1884), American outlaw jailed for organising the Bisbee massacre and later lynched
- John Heath (entomologist) (1922–1987), British entomologist

== See also ==
- John Heath-Stubbs (1918–2006), English poet and translator
- Jack Heath (born 1986), Australian writer of young adult fiction
