= 1610 in poetry =

Nationality words link to articles with information on the nation's poetry or literature (for instance, Irish or France).

== Events ==
- Earliest extant manuscript of Prithviraj Raso discovered in Gujarat.

== Works ==
=== Great Britain ===
- Thomas Collins, The Penitent Publican
- Robert Dowland, A Musicall Banquet, includes songs by John Dowland
- Michael Drayton, A Heavenly Harmonie, new edition of The Harmonie of the Church, originally published in 1564
- Giles Fletcher, Christs Victorie, and Triumph in Heaven, and Earth, Over, and After Death
- Thomas Gainsford, The Vision and Discourse of Henry the Seventh
- John Heath, Two Centuries of Epigrammes
- Robert Jones, The Muses Gardin for Delights; or, The Fift Book of Ayres, songs
- Richard Rich, Newes from Virginia
- Roger Sharpe, More Fools Yet

=== Other ===
- Gaspar Perez de Villagra, Historia de la Nueva Mexico, regarded as the first drama and the first epic poem of European origin generated in the present United States

== Births ==
- January 15 (bapt.) – Sidney Godolphin (killed in action 1643), English
- July 4 – Paul Scarron (died 1660), French poet, playwright and novelist
- July 28 (bapt.) – Henry Glapthorne (died c. 1643), English dramatist and poet
- Also:
  - Jeremias de Dekker, birth year uncertain (died 1666), Dutch
  - Mehmed IV Giray (died 1674), poet and khan of the Crimean Khanate
  - Ye Wanwan (died 1632, according to one source, 1633 according to another), Chinese poet and daughter of poet Shen Yixiu; also sister of women poets Ye Xiaowan and Ye Xiaoluan.

== Deaths ==
- October 6 – Hosokawa Fujitaka 細川藤孝, also known as Hosokawa Yūsai 細川幽斎 (born 1534), Japanese Sengoku period feudal warlord who was a prominent retainer of the last Ashikaga shōguns; father of Hosokawa Tadaoki, an Oda clan senior general; after the 1582 Incident at Honnō-ji, he took the Buddhist tonsure and changed his name to "Yūsai" but remained an active force in politics, under Shōguns Toyotomi Hideyoshi and Tokugawa Ieyasu
- Also – Yuan Hongdao 袁宏道 (born 1568), Chinese poet of the Ming Dynasty, and one of the Three Yuan Brothers
