= Sacred Heart Church (Tombstone, Arizona) =

Historic church in Arizona, United States

- U.S. National Register of Historic Places
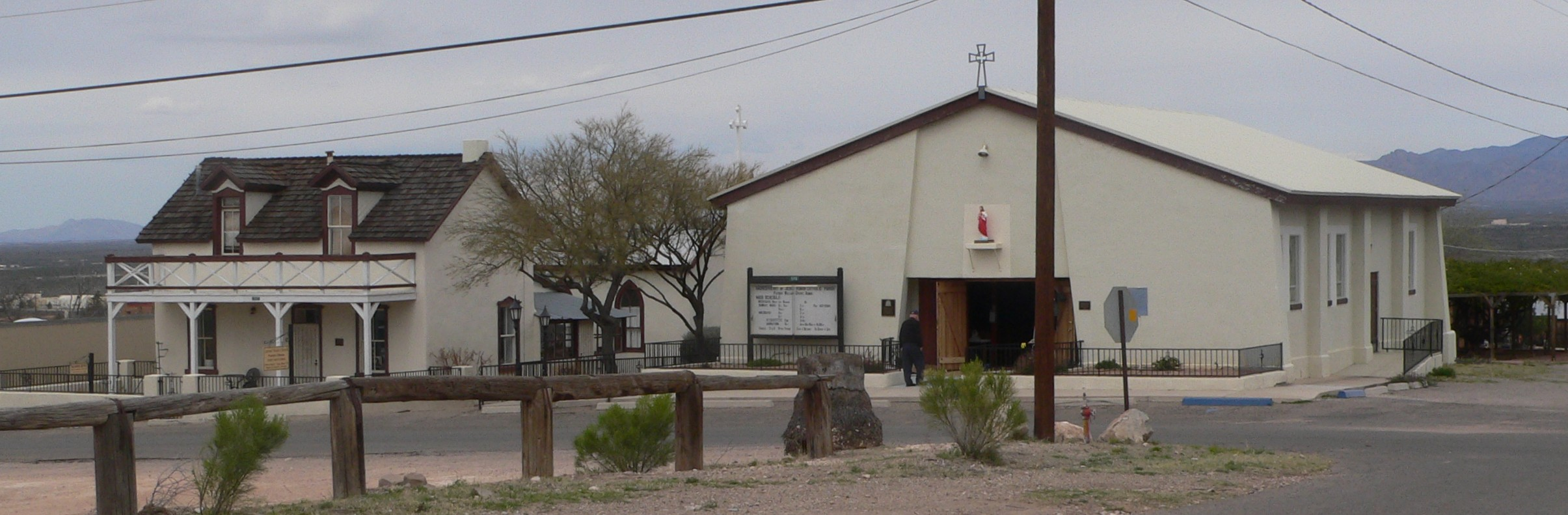
- View from the south. At left is the 1881 original church and rectory; at right is the 1947-built current church.

- Location within Arizona Location within the United States
- Location: 592 Safford St., Tombstone, Arizona
- Coordinates: 31.714112°N 110.064153°W
- Area: less than one acre
- Built: 1881, 1882, 1947
- Architect: Terry Atkinson (1947 building)
- Architectural style: Spanish Colonial Revival/Mission Revival (1947 building)
- NRHP reference No.: 02000032
- Added to NRHP: February 22, 2002

The Sacred Heart Church in Tombstone, Arizona, United States, a Roman Catholic church, was established in 1881, as the first church of any denomination in rough-and-tumble Tombstone, founded in 1877, which had quickly become the largest and busiest city between San Francisco and St. Louis. It was only the sixth Catholic church in the Arizona Territory, and its 1882 building is the oldest known surviving frame church in Arizona. Its courtyard behind holds rose bushes of unusual size.

== Description and history ==
The church is part of the Roman Catholic Diocese of Tucson. The church complex was listed on the National Register of Historic Places in 2002. The listing included three contributing buildings, some non-contributing buildings, and two rose tree roses rose trees which are considered to be contributing objects.

The oldest building is the 1881-built original church building, a one-and-a-half-story stuccoed south-facing vernacular adobe structure which included two church rooms on the first floor and a two-room rectory above. It originally had a three-bay front porch with a veranda above. The building was extended to the north in 1882 by addition of a wooden shed-roofed form with a porch on its east side. The front porch was removed but later restored using a historic photo as model, and the rear porch was enclosed. In 2001 it was in use as the parish offices.

The next oldest is the larger one-story church building built in 1882, which allowed the first building to be used entirely as a rectory. It was built with leadership of Irish-born entrepreneur Nellie Cashman. Now located directly behind the 1881 building, it was built originally on the corner of 6th and Stafford, facing east. It was constructed with board-and-batten walls over wood framing, with a high-pitched wood-shingled roof. It is best termed vernacular in style, but has a Gothic-styled doorway and windows. Its walls were stuccoed over in about 1925, and it was moved in 1946 to its present location, on a concrete foundation, to make way for the 1947 current church. It now serves as the parish hall. Adjacent to the 1882 building was a separate bell tower with a 610-pound bell, added in 1883; this was destroyed in 1946 with the bell eventually placed in 2000 above the rear of the new main building.

The main building now, built in 1947, is a stuccoed concrete block building at the corner facing south. It was designed by Tucson architect Terry Atkinson in a modern Spanish Colonial architecture / Mission Revival architecture style. It has a simple interior with heavy pine ceiling beams and pine doors and trim. Several stained glass windows are donated memorials to church members. This served the need for more church space deriving from military personnel and their families post-World War II.

A gathering place known as the Rose Tree Courtyard is behind the church. It features two rose "trees" planted in the 1880s by the Giacoma-Costella family at their property on Sixth Street, which was later donated to the church. Father Thomas Doyle began tending the roses in 1965 and built a wooden support system. By 2001, the trees were each about 5 feet (1.5 m) in circumference at the base and provided a canopy over a 2,500 square feet (230 m^{2}) area. The courtyard also includes a stone altar and a memorial wall with plaques naming deceased members of the church. While large, these rose trees are dwarfed by the World's Largest Rosebush, located at 118 S. 4th St. in Tombstone, planted in 1885.

In 2001 the complex also included a school building, a modern rectory, and a storage building or two.

== Significance ==
Nellie Cashman was a noted miner and local businesswoman owning a hotel /restaurant, who also worked as a nurse. She was said to have provided spiritual support to the convicted killers of the Bisbee Massacre, and to have prevented a public spectacle of their execution in Tombstone.

The complex was deemed significant and eligible for NRHP listing "for its association with the early development of Tombstone and its continuous role in the social history of the town, particularly as a focus for the Hispanic community." It was "the first church of any denomination built in Tombstone and was the sixth Catholic church constructed in Arizona Territory. The new building provided the “wild west” town of Tombstone's residents their first opportunity to worship in a real church building. The church has proven itself an invaluable part of the community since 1881 and continues to serve community needs today. Two of the buildings are also significant ... for their close association with well-known entrepreneur and humanitarian, Nellie Cashman, who among her many charitable actions raised money to construct the 1881 church building/rectory and the 1882 church building.... The 1881 building is a rare example of an adobe building in Tombstone that is more than one story. Rarer still is the 1882 building, which is the oldest known frame church still standing in Arizona."

== Gallery ==
Sacred Heart Church and Parish
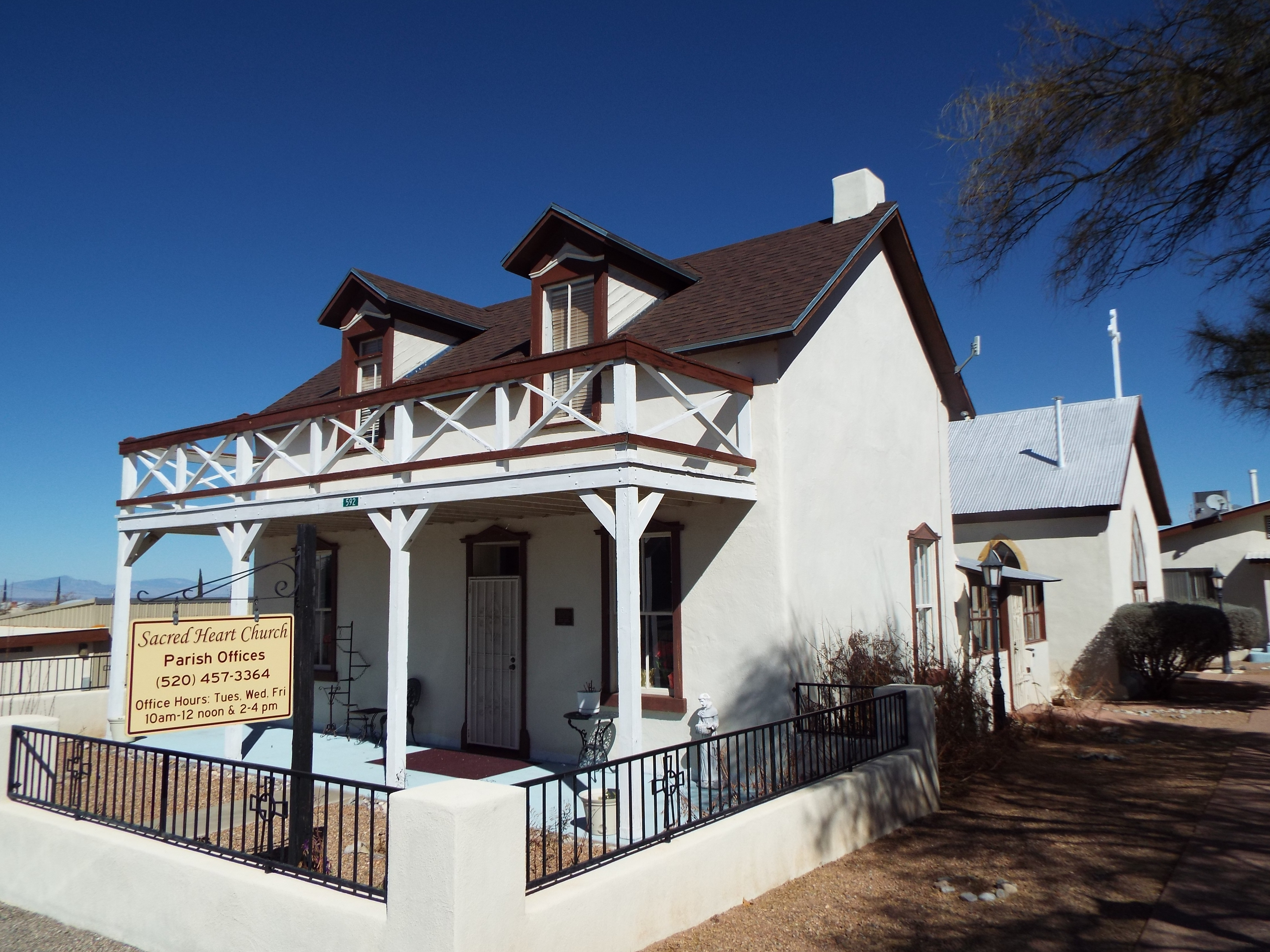
1881 original church and rectory, now parish offices

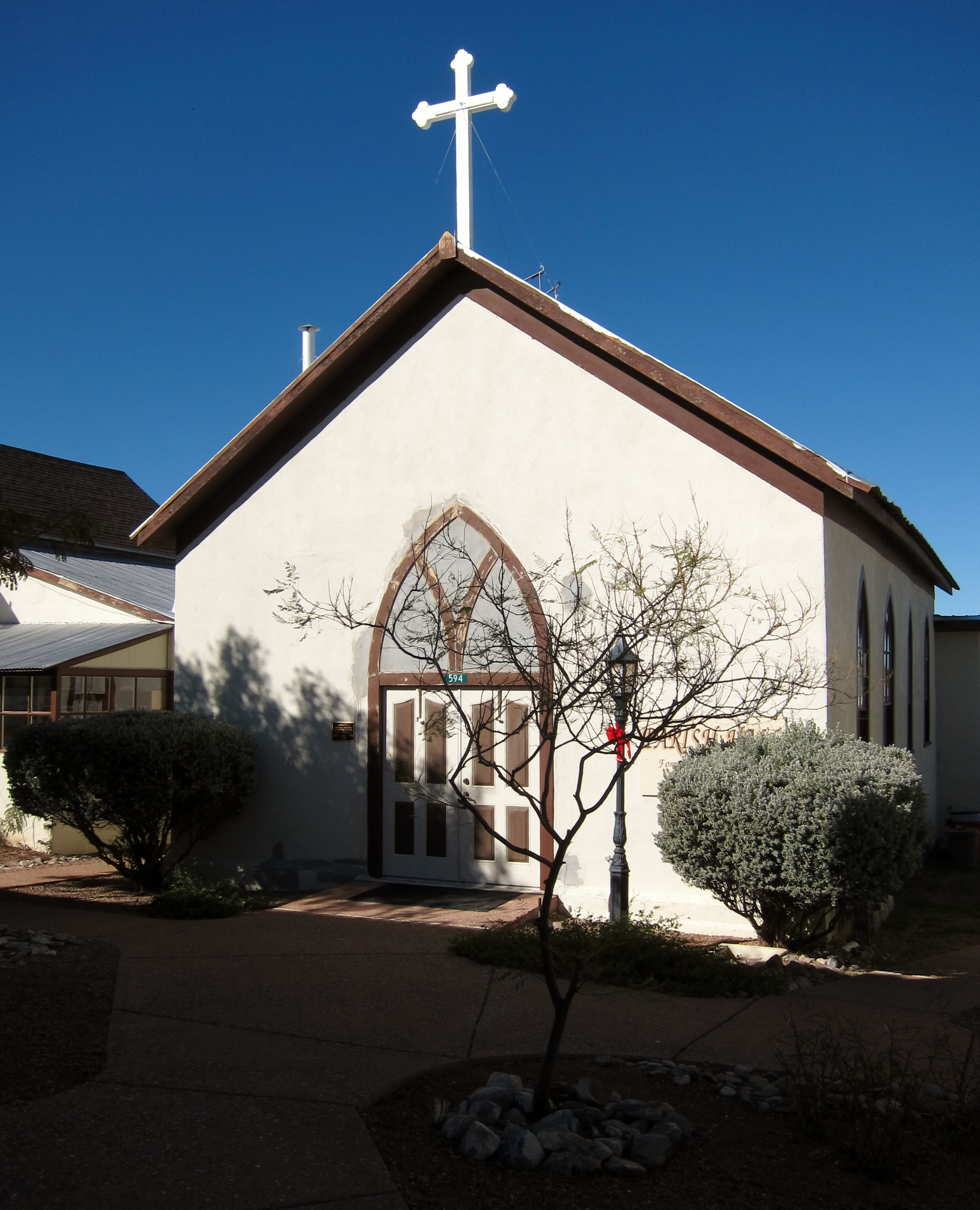
1882 church, now the parish hall

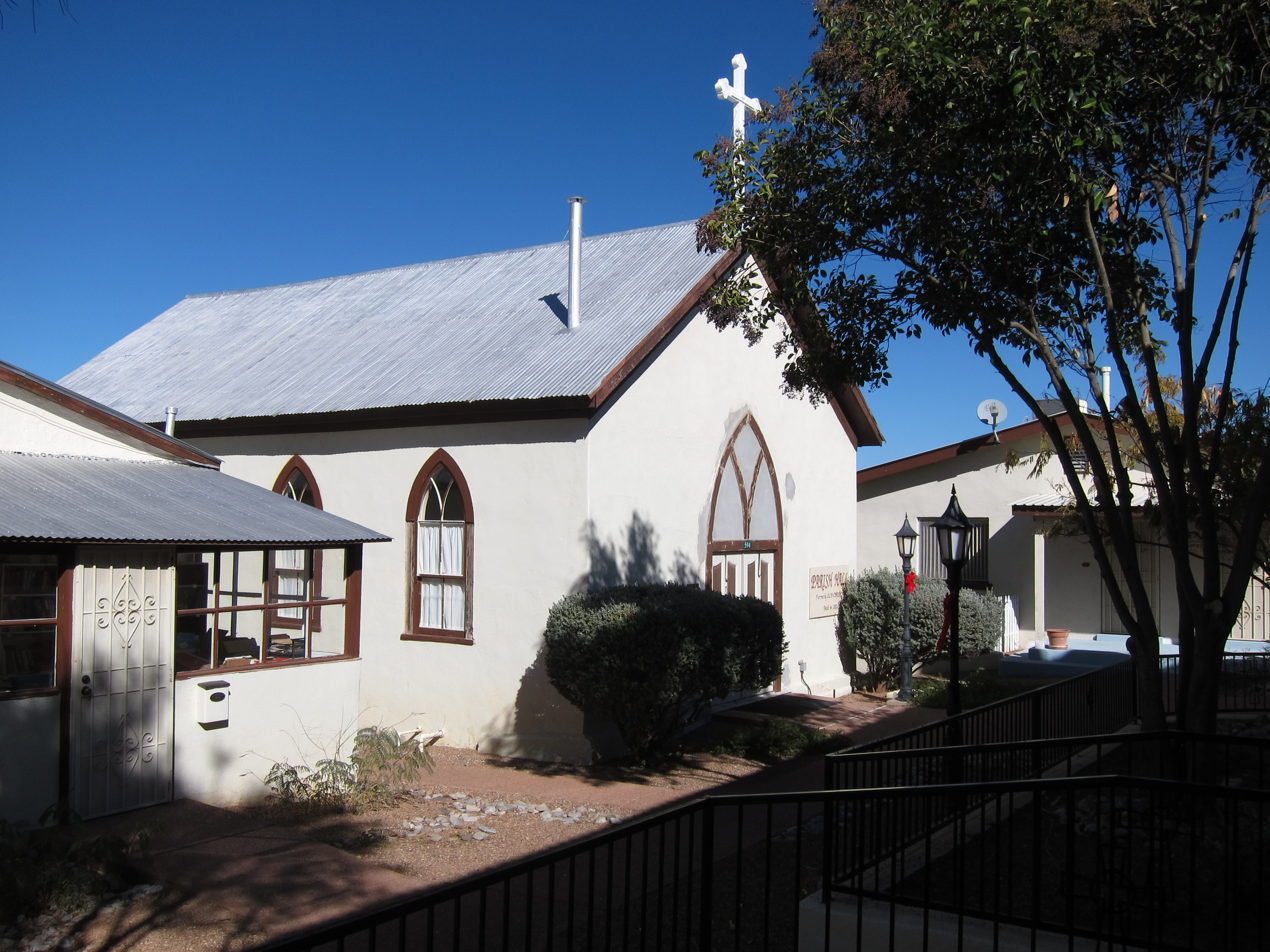
1882 church, now the parish hall, behind

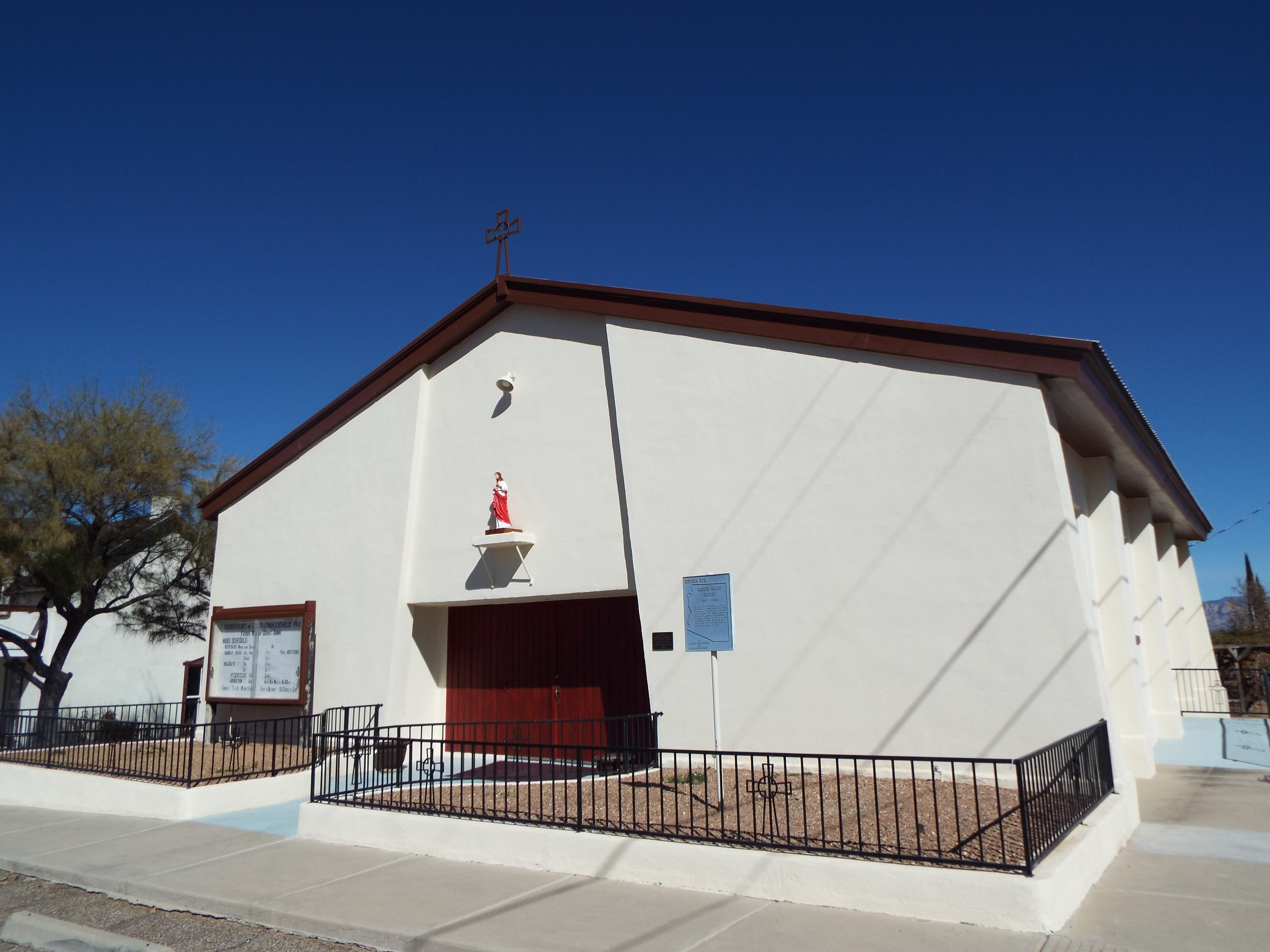
Current

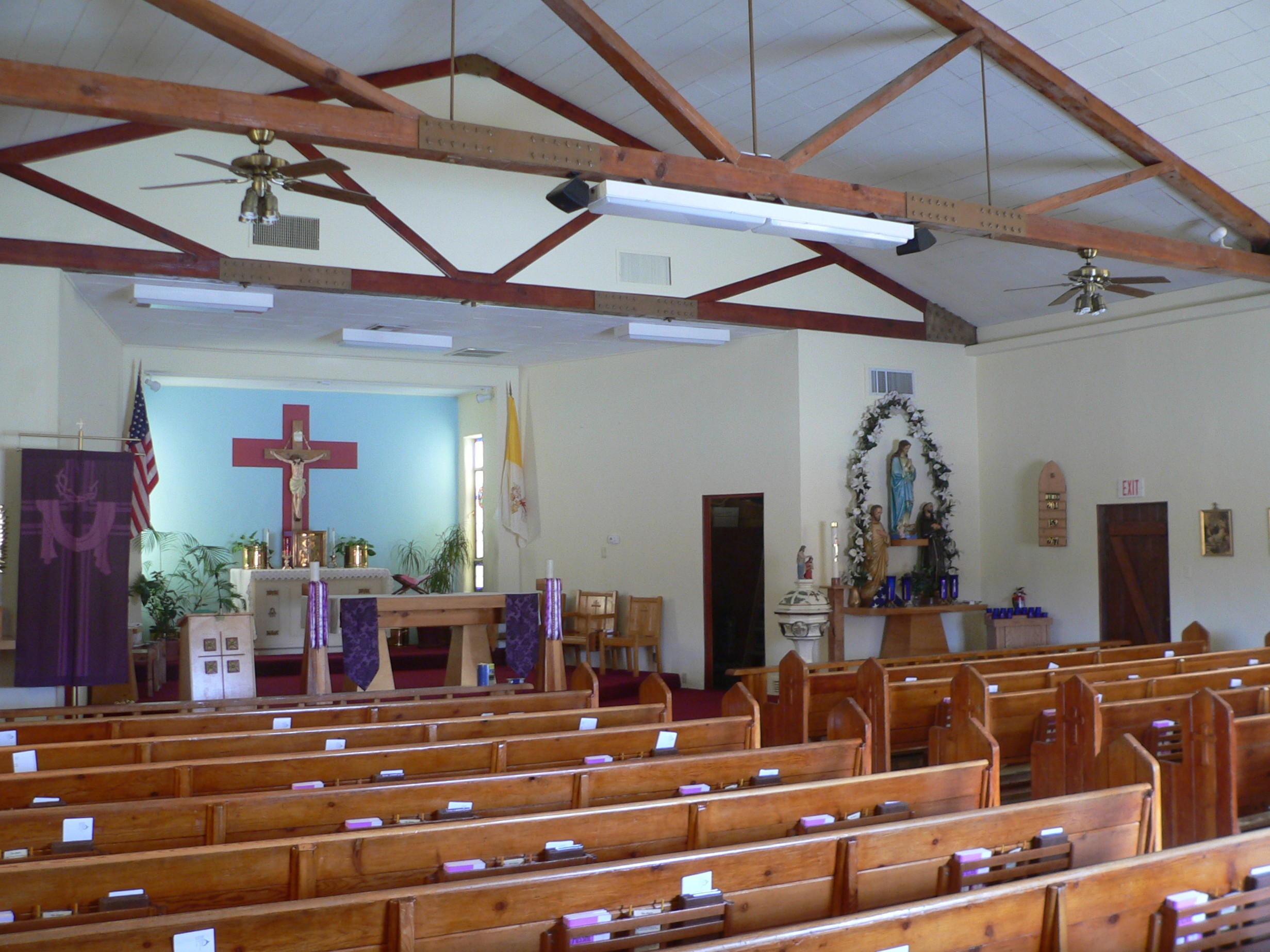
1947 church interior

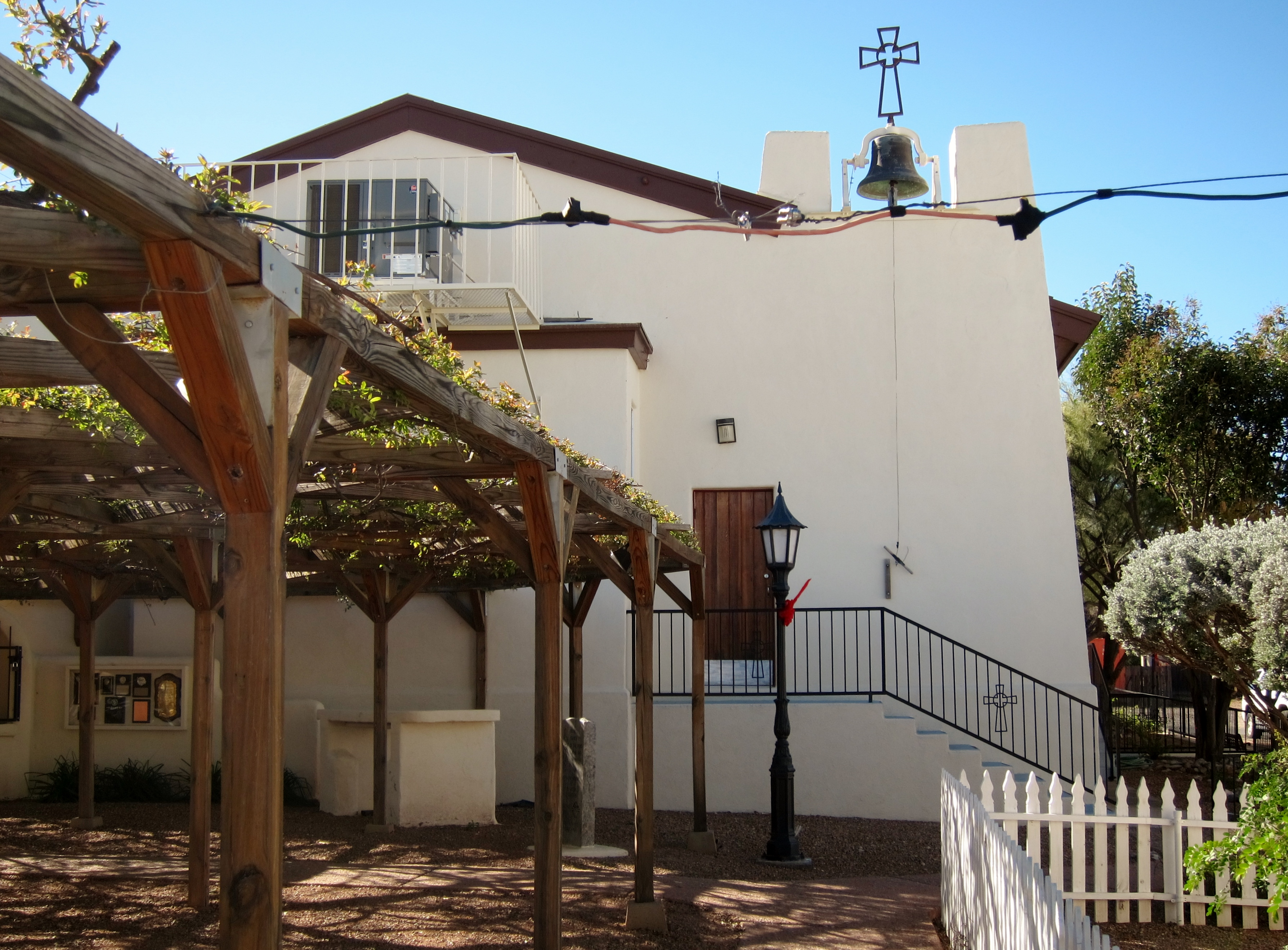
1947 church rear, with 1883 bell and view of a portion of rose arbor to the left

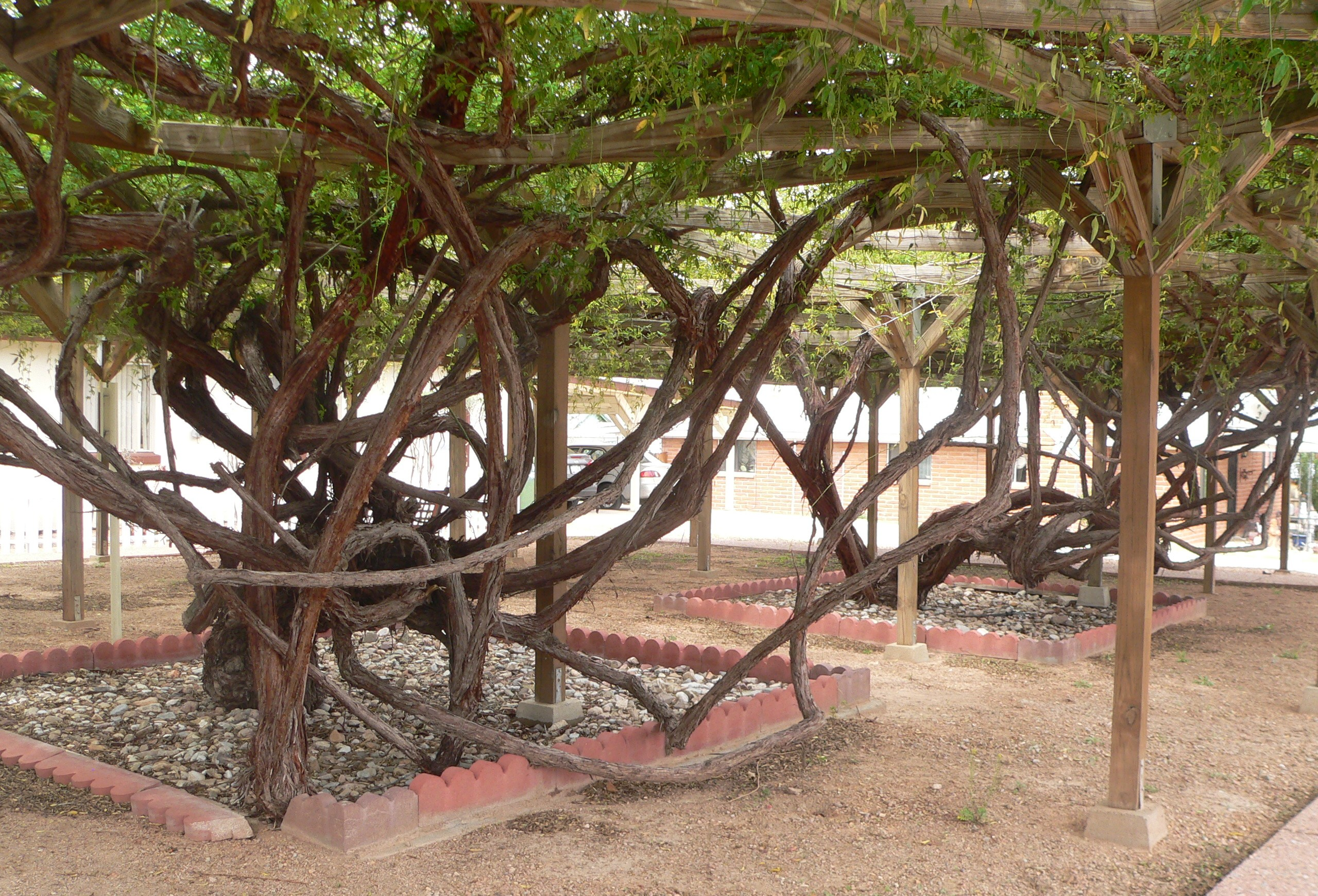
Rose trees in 2015

The complex is located at 516 Safford Street in Tombstone, on the northwest corner of Safford and Sixth St., just one block to the north of the Tombstone Historic District, a U.S. National Historic Landmark.

== See also ==
- World's Largest Rosebush, Tombstone, Arizona
- Old Governor's Mansion (Prescott, Arizona), whose garden includes descendents of 1865-planted roses
