= Nellie Cashman =

American gold prospector (1845–1925)

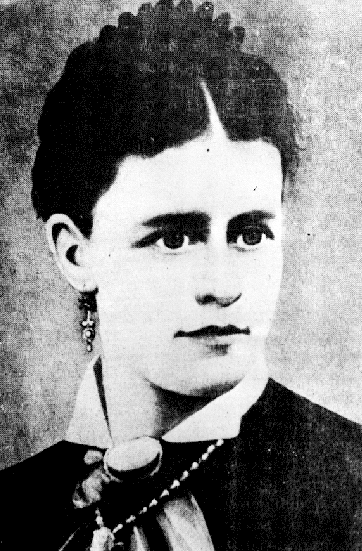
- Ellen Cashman
- Born: Ellen O'Kissane; 25 August 1845; Midleton, County Cork, Ireland
- Died: 4 January 1925 (aged 79–80); Victoria, British Columbia, Canada
- Occupations: Nurse, restaurateur, entrepreneur, and gold prospector
- Children: Reared five nieces and nephews

Ellen Cashman (1845 – 4 January 1925) was an Irish gold prospector, nurse, restaurateur, businesswoman and philanthropist in Arizona, Alaska, British Columbia and Yukon.

Cashman led a rescue party to miners to the Cassiar Country gold mine in the Cassiar Mountains of British Columbia. In Tombstone, Arizona, Cashman raised money to build the Sacred Heart Catholic Church, and did charitable work with the Sisters of St. Joseph. She went to the Yukon during the Klondike Gold Rush for gold prospecting, working there until 1905. She became nationally known as a frontierswoman, with the Associated Press covering a later trip. A devout Catholic, she raised funds for hospitals, schools, and churches wherever she settled. Her heroics and charity gained her the names the "Angel of Cassiar," the "Angel of Tombstone," and the "Saint of the Sourdoughs."

In 2006, Cashman was inducted into the Alaska Mining Hall of Fame.

== Early life ==
Ellen "Nellie" O'Kissane was born in County Cork in the mid 1840s to Frances and Patrick O'Kissane. Their surname was later anglicized to Cashman. Some sources give 1844 as her year of birth, while some other research indicates she was the Ellen Cashman baptised on 15 October 1845. The exact location of her birth is uncertain; she was either born in Belvelly or in Middleton (now Midleton), which has claimed her as a "native daughter." Her family lived on Free School Lane (now known as Mc Donaghs Lane). After Nellie was born, the Cashmans had another, Frances (known as Fanny). Likely while Fanny was still a baby, Patrick Cashman died. This was possibly due to starvation or another disease related to the Great Famine (Ireland). Between 1850 and 1852 (sources vary), the Cashmans immigrated to the United States, settling first in Boston.

As an adolescent, Cashman worked as a bellhop in a Boston hotel. She also served as an elevator operator. One story notes that during the Civil War, she overheard a conversation while operating an elevator in Washington, DC. Nellie reported the conversation, contributing to the Union victory.

In 1865 or 1866, Cashman and her family moved to San Francisco, California. Nellie and her mother likely moved to Virginia City, Nevada in 1870, where Nellie briefly worked as a camp cook. They later moved to Pioche, Nevada, where they purchased the Miner's Boarding House. Nellie quickly took over managerial duties from her mother. This time gave Nellie her later sobriquet, Nellie Pioche. Nellie and her mother travelled to San Francisco, where Frances settled. In 1874, Cashman joined a group of prospectors from Nevada. They tossed a coin to decide if they would travel to South Africa or British Columbia, ultimately deciding to go to British Columbia.

== British Columbia ==
Cashman left her family home in 1874 for the Cassiar Country in British Columbia. She set up a boarding house for miners at Telegraph Creek, asking for donations to the Sisters of St Anne in return for the services available at her boarding house. For the first time, Cashman became a miner herself. She used the talk in her boarding house to purchase promising claims at good times and learned elementary mining techniques and geology. She also invested in other prospectors.

Cashman was travelling to Victoria to deliver 500 dollars to the sisters of St. Anne when she heard that a snowstorm had descended on the Cassiar Mountains, stranding and injuring 26 miners, who were also suffering from scurvy. She took charge of a six-man search party and collected food and medicine to take to the stranded miners. Conditions in the Cassiar Mountains were so dangerous that the Canadian Army advised against attempting the rescue. The snow was too deep for dogs, so the group used snow shoes to walk with the 1,500 pounds (680) kilograms of food they had brought. During one avalanche, Cashman was deeply buried, but dug her way out.

Upon learning of Cashman's expedition, a commander sent his troops to locate her party and bring them to safety. An army trooper eventually found Cashman camped on the frozen surface of the Stikine River. Cashman refused their escort back. After 77 days of harsh weather, Cashman and her party located the sick men, who numbered far more than 26. Some historical accounts credit Cashman with saving the lives of as many as 75 men. She administered a diet containing Vitamin C to restore the men to health. When the men improved, Cashman reopened her boarding house, which prospered. She was afterward fondly known in the region as the "Angel of the Cassiar".

By 1876, there was considerably less production from Cassiar prospecting. Cashman left Cassiar for good. She went to Victoria again to deliver $543 to the Sisters of St Anne, which helped fund St. Joseph's Hospital. She then went on to San Francisco, where her mother and sister still lived.

== Arizona ==
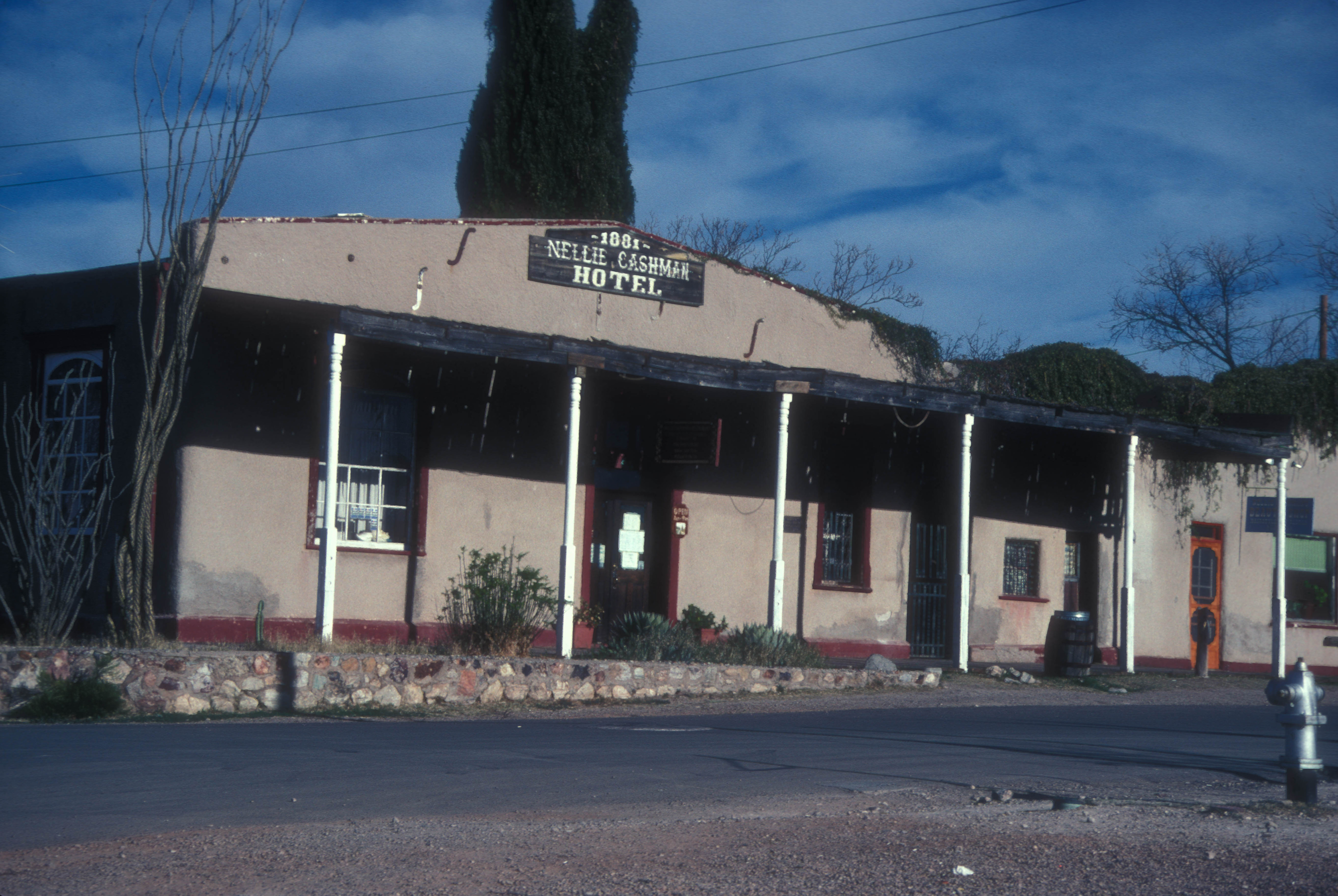
Nellie Cashman's Hotel in Tombstone

In 1879, Cashman left California to travel to Tucson, Arizona. She opened the Delmonico Restaurant (likely named after New York establishment). In Tucson, she befriended newspaperman John Clum.

Around 1880, Cashman moved to Tombstone, Arizona. She opened The Nevada Boot & Shoe store, likely selling products from her brother-in-law's factory. The store also sold other goods, including clothing and furnishing goods, cigars, and tobacco. She later opened another business, the Tombstone Cash Store. This store, which she opened with a friend, sold groceries and other provisions. The store was successful and Cashman bought out her friend. By 1881, Cashman was also leasing the Arcade Restaurant.

In 1880, Cashman began raising money to build the Sacred Heart Catholic Church, which opened the next year. She also became the treasurer of the Miners' Hospital Association and brought three Sisters of Mercy from Tucson to attend to the miners. Cashman committed herself to charity work with the Sisters of St. Joseph, taking a position as a nurse in a Cochise County hospital. When an epidemic swept Tombstone, she, along with local prostitute "Black Jack," nursed the sick at Russ House. Cashman also supported Irish causes, particularly the Irish National Land League. Further, she organized support for one of the first Tombstone schools.

Cashman briefly leased the Bisbee Hotel, but was unsuccessful, as Bisbee was not yet flourishing. She quickly returned to Tombstone.

Cashman's sister Fanny Cunningham was widowed in 1881. Cashman arranged for Fanny and her five children to join her in Tombstone. The sisters leased a boarding house, made extensive renovations, and opened Delmonico Lodging. A fire at the boarding house, which the community was able to quickly put out, led Cashman to gain the legend of being able to stop an advancing fire. Around this time, Cashman and her associate Joseph Pascholy purchased and ran a restaurant and hotel in called Russ House, which was later named after Cashman. One story notes Doc Holliday defending her cooking to a disgruntled Russ House customer.

In December 1881, Cashman sold her half of Russ House so she could care for Fanny, who was showing signs of tuberculosis. Fanny also sold Delmonico's lodging. While Cashman continued to buy and sell mining claims, she devoted herself to caring for her sister, nieces, and nephews. In 1882, Fanny's tuberculosis went into remission. The sisters opened a new hotel, The American, which hosted a twenty-four hour dining room. Cashman also re-purchased the Russ House.

In 1883, Cashman led a group of miners (including Milt Joyce and Marcus A. Smith) to Baja, where gold had been discovered. She and five or six of the party went ahead as a reconnoitering party, but quickly were endangered by the harsh desert conditions. One legend claims that Cashman met a priest, who begged her not to disclose the gold near his parish for the sake of his community. Another claims that an angel guided her to a mission, where Cashman was able to obtain supplies, saving her companions. They reunited with the larger party and travelled to Trinidad Bay to arrange for a boat. When the boat captain appeared on deck drunkly deluded, some of the prospectors tied him up to sleep it off. When they arrived in Guaymas, the prospectors and crew were arrested for imprisoning the captain, but were rescued a few days later by the American consul.

Cashman returned to Tombstone, where she resumed running her businesses. Fanny, health declining, moved to San Diego to be nursed by nuns until she died in July 1884. Cashman took up caring for her nieces and nephews, aged three to thirteen, and her mother. She supported the children's education, sending them away to religious institutions for further education. One of Cashman's nephews, Mike, attended college in Los Angeles and Santa Fe, becoming prominent in Cochise County. Mike named a daughter Ellen in honor of Cashman. Similarly, one of Cashman's nieces, upon becoming a nun, took on the name Sister St. Helena in tribute to Cashman.

In December 1883, bandits committed the Bisbee massacre in Tombstone, killing four innocent bystanders and wounding two others in the course of a robbery. The five men were convicted and sentenced to die by hanging on 28 March 1884. The Tombstone Epitaph reported that Cashman was in "constant attendance" at the jail, where she joined clergy in visiting the men. When a local businessman constructed bleachers and sold tickets to the hanging, Cashman asked the sheriff to intervene and take down the bleachers. Although he refused to, local miners, possibly instigated by Cashman's request, tore down the bleachers the night before the execution. The hangings proceeded as scheduled, but out of public view. John Clum reported that Cashman's spiritual counsel converted the three non-Catholics in their last days. When Cashman learned that a medical school planned to exhume the bodies of the convicts for study, she enlisted two prospectors to stand watch over the Boot Hill Cemetery for 10 days.

Another legend claims that Cashman learning the local mine superintendent was to be kidnapped and possibly hanged by protesting miners, quickly drove him out of town. He went to Tucson until things had calmed.

As Tombstone quieted as the city died, Cashman sold claims and only ran the Russ House for some time, caring for her family.

In 1886, Cashman left Tombstone. She moved around over the next several years. She looked at claims around the country. She opened and closed restaurants and boardinghouses and sold supplies in Nogales, Tucson, Kingston, New Mexico, Harquahala, Globe, and Yuma. Her restaurant in Kingston was particularly notable as some biographers claim she hired oil tycoon Ed Doheny as a dishwasher. In Harquahala, she may have become close to marrying Mike Sullivan, who had discovered gold in the area. Her prospecting brought her to Idaho, Wyoming, Montana, and possibly South Africa.

== Yukon and Alaska ==
In 1898, Cashman left Arizona for the Yukon in search of gold. She likely arrived in Dawson City that April as one of the first stampeders to settle there. As an unmarried woman, Cashman was unable to purchase unestablished claims. However, she was able to obtain several claims. Cashman was one of the few women in Dawson to work her own claims. In 1898, she opened a restaurant, Delmonico, to finance her mining. She also established another restaurant, the Cassiar, a room called The Prospector's Haven of Retreat (meant to provide an alternative to saloons and gambling), and purchased a grocery store. Her nephew Tom joined her in Dawson and helped at the restaurant and her claims. She continued her charitable work in Dawson, raising funds for the local hospital to expand. While in the Yukon, Cashman was involved in several legal disputes. Notably, one involved Belinda Mulrooney. Cashman had several health problems while in Dawson, including a major surgery and a multi-month hospital stay.

Cashman's prospecting ventures took her to Klondike, Fairbanks and Nolan Creek in Yukon-Koyukuk County, Alaska. In 1904, she settled in Fairbanks, where she opened a successful grocery and miners' supply store and raised funds for the local hospital. Memoirist Clara Heinz Burke recalled that Cashman would raise funds by waiting at a saloon until a gambling jackpot was large, sweep the funds off the table, and tell the gamblers that if they had funds to gamble, they had the means to donate the money to the hospital.

In 1905, Cashman settled in Koyukuk, Alaska, along with other established miners. At one point, she owned eleven mines there. During the winters, Cashman travelled visit family and friends and do work in Dawson, Fairbanks, Seattle, California, and Arizona. She would then return to Koyukuk, where she had made her home. In 1921, Cashman travelled south to attempt to raise funds for the machines needed for mining. The next year, she created the Midnight Sun Mining Company to raise funds for the machinery. Looking for further investments, the seventy-seven year old Cashman travelled to Anchorage by dog team, aiming to eventually go to Florida to meet with an investor.

In January 1925, Cashman fell ill. She was admitted to St. Joseph's Hospital in Fairbanks, where she was diagnosed with pneumonia and rheumatism. She was sent to Seattle and, realizing her illness, asked to be sent to the Sisters of St. Anne, the same hospital which she had helped to build fifty-one years earlier. She died there, and was interred at Ross Bay Cemetery in Victoria, British Columbia. As news of her death spread, obituaries were published in newspapers in mining towns like Dawson, Fairbanks, and Tombstone, as well as in leading papers like the Los Angeles Times, the New York Times, and the San Francisco Chronicle.

== Legacy and honors ==
- The 1959–1960 season of the ABC western television series, The Life and Legend of Wyatt Earp, with Hugh O'Brian starring as Wyatt Earp, featured a fictional character based on Nellie Cashman played by actress Randy Stuart (1924–1996).
- Grace Lee Whitney played Cashman in "The Angel of Tombstone" of the syndicated western series Death Valley Days, hosted by Robert Taylor.
- In 1982, the Puget Sound-based group Women Business Owner established the Nellie Cashman Award, or the "Nellie," now known as the Women Business Owners of the Year Awards.
- In 1984, Cashman was inducted into the Arizona Women's Hall of Fame
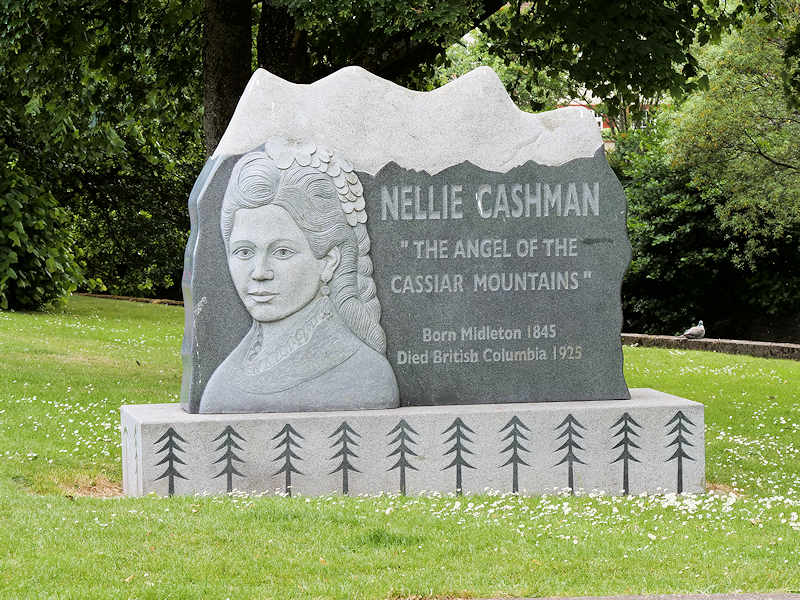
  Monument in memory of Nellie Cashman in Midleton
- On 18 October 1994, Cashman was featured on a United States postage stamp as part of the Legends of the West series.
- On 15 March 2006, Nellie Cashman was inducted posthumously into the Alaska Mining Hall of Fame.
- In 2007, she was inducted into the National Cowgirl Museum and Hall of Fame in Fort Worth, Texas.
- In June 2014, a monument in Nellie's honour was erected near her home in Midleton County Cork.

== Other sources ==
- Don Chaput, (1995) Nellie Cashman, and the North American Mining Frontier (Tucson, Westernlore Press) ISBN 9780870260933
- Ronald Wayne Fischer (2000) Nellie Cashman: Frontier Angel, (Talei Publishers) ISBN 978-0963177261
- John P. Clum (1931) "Nellie Cashman," Arizona Historical Review, v. iii, 9–34.
- Illing, Thora Kerr (2016) Gold Rush Queen: the extraordinary life of Nellie Cashman (Touchwood Editions) ISBN 978-1-77151-159-9
- Claire Rudolf Murphy and Jane G. Haigh (1997) "Nellie Cashman," in Gold Rush Women (Alaska Northwest Books, p. 112–116) ISBN 978-0882404844

== Related reading ==
- Melanie J. Mayer, 1989, Klondike Women, Ohio University Press.
- Anon. (1999). The Islander, Portraits of Cobh, (No.3), Cobh Museum, Co. Cork, 1999.
- Banks, Leo W. (1999). Stalwart Women: Frontier Stories of Indomitable Spirit. Arizona Highways Books. ISBN 978-0-916179-77-9.
- LeBlanc, Suzanne (2003). Cassiar: A Jewel in the Wilderness. Prince George, B.C. : Caitlin Press. ISBN 978-0-920576-99-1.
