= Thomas Collins (poet) =

English poet

- Occupation: Poet

Thomas Collins (fl. 1615) was an English poet.

== Biography ==
Collins was the author of a very rare religious poem entitled "The Penitent Publican, his Confession of Mouth, Contrition of Heart, unfained Repentance. And feruent Prayer unto God for Mercie and Forgiuenesses," London (by Arthur Johnson), 4to, 1610. The dedicatory epistle, dated 6 July 1610, is addressed "To the Right Honourable, Graue and Vertuous Lady, the Lady Katherine Hastings, Countesse of Huntington," and is signed with the author's name. The poem is written throughout in seven-line stanzas, and evinces strong religious fervour. In 1615 Collins wrote a pastoral poem named "The Teares of Loue, or Cupid's Progresse. Together with the complaint of the sorrowfull Shepheardesse fayre (but unfortunate) Candida, deploring the death of her deare-lo"d Coravin, a late living (and an ever to be lamented) Shepheard. In a passionate pastorall Elegie. Composed by Thomas Collins," &c. London (by George Purslowe), 1615. The poet Coravin, whose death Collins laments, has not been identified. The poem is full of conceits, but at its end Sir Philip Sidney, Edmund Spenser, and Michael Drayton are eulogised, and allusion is made to Thomas Lodge. Jo. B[eaumont?] and Samuel Rowlands contributed prefatory verses. The former refers to a third poem by Collins on "Newport"s bloudy battell … with Yaxley's death," which is not otherwise known. Rowlands calls Collins "his affected friend." Copies of both the known poems of Collins were in Sir Francis Freeling's library, but only unique copies of either are now believed to be extant.
