= John Heath (cricketer, born 1807) =

English cricketer (1807–1878)

Personal information
- Full name: John Heath
- Born: 12 November 1807; Lambeth, Surrey, England
- Died: 7 November 1878 (aged 70); City of London, England
- Batting: Right-handed

Domestic team information
- Years: Team
- 1846–1854: Surrey

Career statistics
Competition	First-class
Matches	25
Runs scored	294
Batting average	7.17
100s/50s	–/–
Top score	35
Balls bowled	–
Wickets	–
Bowling average	–
5 wickets in innings	–
10 wickets in match	–
Best bowling	–
Catches/stumpings	23/–
- Source: Cricinfo, 29 June 2013

John Heath (12 November 1807 – 7 November 1878) was an English cricketer active in the 1840s and 1850s, making over twenty appearances in first-class cricket. Born at Lambeth, Surrey, Heath was a right-handed batsman, who played for a handful of first-class cricket teams.

== Career ==
Heath made his first-class debut for England against Kent at White Hart Field, Bromley, with him making a further first-class appearance for England in that season against Hampshire at Day's Ground, Southampton. Heath's next appearance in first-class cricket did not come until 1846, when he played for Surrey against Kent. He made a further appearance for Surrey in that season against the same opposition, as well as playing for England against Kent, and for the Surrey Club against the Marylebone Cricket Club at Lord's. In the following season, Heath made three first-class appearances, all for Surrey, playing twice against Kent and once against the Marylebone Cricket Club. He didn't feature in first-class matches in 1848, but did play once for Surrey against England at Lord's in 1849. He next featured for Surrey in 1851, making four first-class appearances, with two against Yorkshire, and a single match each against Nottinghamshire and Sussex. In 1852, Heath made five first-class appearances for Surrey, as well as being selected to play for the South in that seasons North v South fixture. He played in the fixture in the following season, once again representing the South, as well as appearing twice for Surrey, while in 1854 he made his final two appearances in first-class cricket, both for Surrey against Nottinghamshire. Playing nineteen of his 25 first-class matches for Surrey, Heath scored 218 runs for the county, averaging 7.03, with a high score of 35. Overall he scored 294 runs at average of 7.17.

He died at the City of London on 7 November 1878.
