= Thomas Gainsford =

Thomas Gainsford (died 1624) was a writer and news editor.

Gainsford belonged to the Surrey family of Gainsford. He inherited property in Lombard Street in the City of London. He and Edward Stene apparently purchased of the crown Alne manor, Warwickshire, and a cottage in Stutton, Yorkshire, on 27 November 1599 (Cal. State Papers, Dom. 1598–1601, p. 347). He is known to have served in Ireland under Richard de Burgh, fourth earl of Clanricarde, as "third officer" of the "earl's regiment" when the Spaniards were dislodged from Kinsale on 24 December 1601. He was also engaged in the war against Tyrone in Ulster. As captain, Gainsford undertook to occupy land in Ulster at the plantation of 1610 (Irish State Papers, 1608–10, p. 367). Gainsford is reputed to have been the first London periodical news editor. Ben Jonson, associating the source of these publications with the stationer Thomas Archer's bookshop in Pope's Head Alley between the Exchange and Lombard Street, referred to his work as

'Captaine Pamphlet's horse and foot that sally
Upon the Exchange at Pope's Head Alley

Gainsford became associated with the publications of the news syndicate formed in 1622 by Nathaniel Butter, Thomas Archer, Nicholas Bourne, William Sheffard and Bartholomew Downes and was responsible for taking control of the style, organization and presentation of the news. He helped readers to understand news from many cities, armies and battle scenes that could otherwise have been confusing to those unfamiliar with European dynasties and armies but concerned by news of catholic advances in the Counter Reformation. In this way he played a part in educating them about military affairs and the progress of the Thirty Years' War. He also wrote many editorials 'To the Reader', establishing a relationship with readers and addressing them and their anxieties directly.

On 4 September 1624 Chamberlain wrote to Carleton that the deaths of the week in London included "Captain Gainsford, the gazette maker"

Other editors were employed by the London newspapers, including William Watts who is credited with editing The Swedish Intelligencer in the early 1630s, but none achieved the same level of notoriety and interest.

== Known works ==
Gainsford published the following:

- The Vision and Discourse of Henry the seventh concerning the unitie of Great Britaine, London, by G. Eld for Henry Fetherstone, 1610, in verse of six-line stanzas; dedicated to "the truly religious and resolute gentlemen of England". An address from Henry VII to James I figures in the poem. Only two copies are now known, one at Bridgewater House, the other at the British Museum (Collier, Bibliogr. Manual, i. 300–1; Corser, Collectanea, vol. vi.).
- The Historie of Trebizond in foure books, by Thomas Gainsforde, esquier, Lond., 1616, a collection of romantic stories. The books are separately dedicated to the Countess Dowager of Derby, the Countess of Huntingdon, Lady Frances Egerton, and Lady Chandos respectively.
- The Secretaries Studie; or directions for the … judicious inditing of Letters, London, 1616; no copy is in the British Museum.
- The True and Wonderfull History of Perkin Warbeck, London, 1618, dedicated to the Earl of Arundel; reprinted in The Harleian Miscellany, vol. iii.
- The Glory of England, or a true Description of many excellent Prerogatives and remarkable Blessings whereby she triumpheth over all the Nations of the World, London, 1618, dedicated to Buckingham. All "the eminent kingdoms of the earth" are here compared with England to their disadvantage. A curious account of Ireland from the author's own experience concludes book i. Book ii. treats of Russia, and compares London with Paris, Venice, and Constantinople. A revised edition appeared in 1619, and was reissued in 1620.
- The True Exemplary and Remarkable History of the Earl of Tirone, London, 1619, dedicated to the Earl of Clanricarde; of no great value, but interesting as a nearly contemporary record.

== Works attributed to Gainsford ==
William Hazlitt also conjecturally assigns to Gainsford The Rich Cabinet Furnished with Varietie of Excellent Discriptions, Exquisite Characters, Witty Discourses and Delightfull Histories, Deuine and Morrall (1616). An appendix—"an epitome of good manners extracted out of the treatise of M. Iohn della Casa [Giovanni della Casa] called Galatea"—is signed T. G., together with a Latin motto. This signature resembles those in Gainsford's undoubted books, but the question of authorship is very doubtful. Some hostile remarks on players, on folios 116–118, are interesting. The book was popular; a fourth edition is dated 1668, and a sixth 1689.

The Friers Chronicle, or the True Legend of Priests and Monkes Lives (London: for Robert Mylbourne, 1623), has a dedication to the Countess of Devonshire, signed T. G., and has been attributed to Gainsford. But Thomas Goad (1576–1638) is more probably the author.
