= John Heath (epigrammatist) =

English epigrammatist

- Born: Stalls, Somersetshire, England
- Occupation: Epigrammatist

John Heath (fl. 1615) was an English epigrammatist.

== Biography ==
Heath was born at Stalls, Somersetshire, and entered at Winchester College in 1600 at the age of thirteen (Kirby, Winchester Scholars, p. 159). He matriculated at New College, Oxford, on 11 Oct. 1605, when his age is given as twenty, was admitted perpetual fellow in 1609, and proceeded B.A. 2 May 1609, and M.A. 16 Jan. 1613 (Reg. Univ. Oxon. ii. pt. i. 271, iii. 286, Oxf. Hist. Soc.). He resigned his fellowship in 1616. In 1610 he published "Two Centuries of Epigrammes," inscribed to Thomas Bilson, the bishop of Winchester's son, and claims that his work is free from "filthy and obscene jests." Many epigrams are addressed to well-known literary men of the day. He contributed verses to the volume issued on the death of Sir Thomas Bodley, and to other collections of the kind. He translated Peter du Moulin's "Accomplishment of the Prophecies of Daniel and the Revelation," in defence of King James against Robert Bellarmine, 1613, and Wood says he translated some works out of Spanish. He was possibly the author of "The House of Correction, or certayne Satyrical Epigrams written by J. H., Gent.," London, 1619, which was republished with a different title-page in 1621, but it is very doubtful whether he is the "I. H." who wrote "The Divell of the Vault or the Unmasking of Murther" (1606). John Davies of Hereford has an epigram to Heath in the "Scourge of Folly," p. 252, and Ben Jonson in his "Discoveries" (lxx) says contemptuously, "Heath's epigrams and the skuller's (i.e. John Taylor's) poems have their applause."
