= Bisbee massacre =

1884 homicides in Cochise County, Arizona

Coordinates: 31°26′30″N 109°54′57″W

Bisbee Massacre
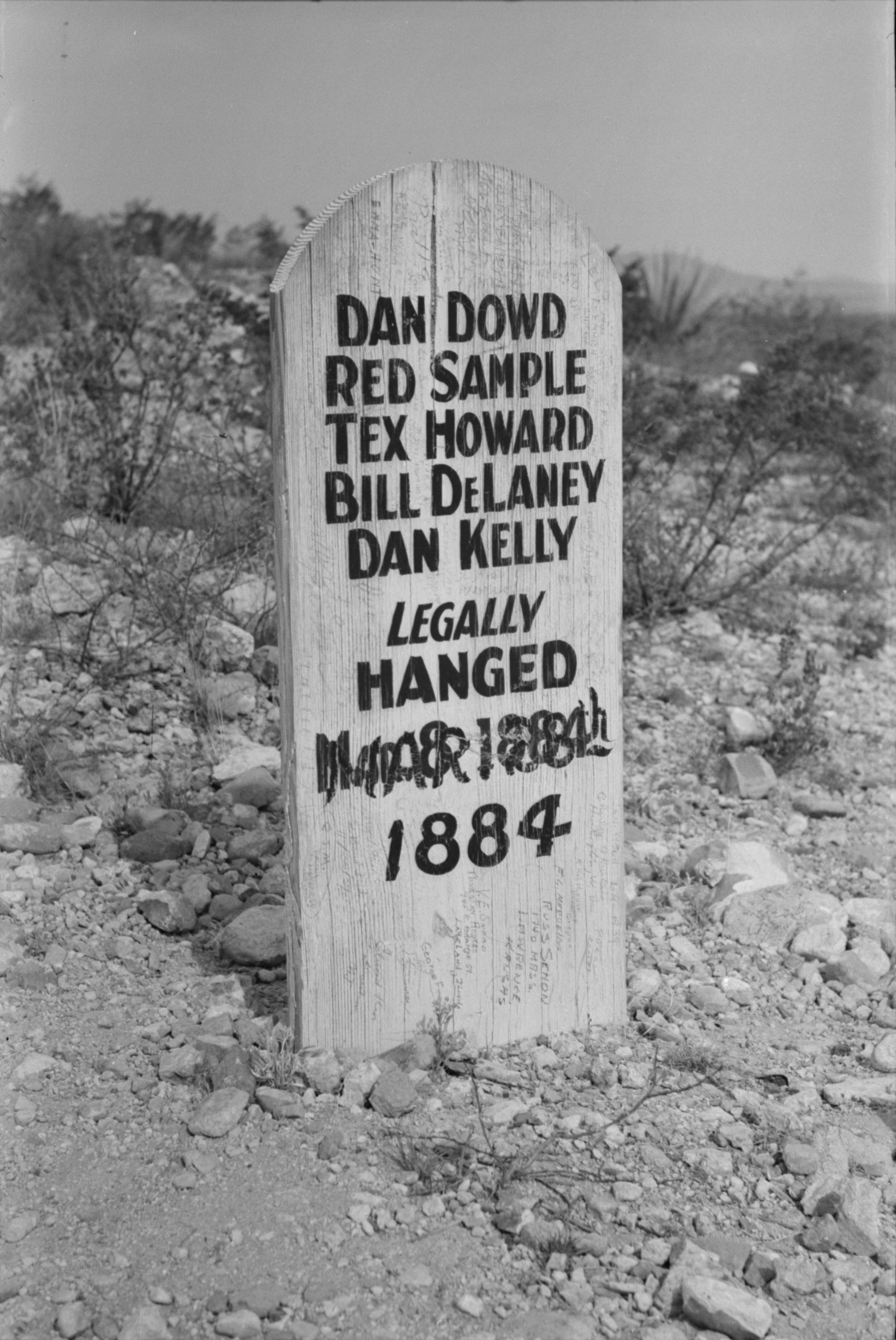
- Grave marker in 1940 in the Tombstone Boothill Graveyard for the five outlaws executed for the Bisbee Massacre
- Date: December 8, 1883
- Location: Bisbee, Arizona Territory, United States
- Also known as: Bisbee Murders, Bisbee Raid
- Outcome: Five Cowboys arrested and executed
- Deaths: 4

The Bisbee massacre (a.k.a. the Bisbee murders or Bisbee raid) occurred in Bisbee, Arizona, on December 8, 1883, when six outlaws who were part of the Cochise County Cowboys robbed a general store. Believing the general store's safe contained a mining payroll of $7,000, they timed the robbery incorrectly and were only able to steal between $800 and $3,000, along with a gold watch and jewelry. During the robbery, members of the gang killed five people, including a lawman and a pregnant woman. Six men were convicted of the robbery and murders. John Heath, who was accused of organizing the robbery, was tried separately and sentenced to life in prison. The other five men were convicted of murder and sentenced to hang.

Unsatisfied with Heath's sentence, a lynch mob forcibly removed Heath from jail and hanged him from a telegraph pole on February 22, 1884. The other five men were executed on March 28, 1884. They were the first criminals to be legally hanged in Tombstone. The graves of the five murderers is part of the popular Boothill Graveyard tourist attraction in Tombstone.

== Background ==
John T. Heath was born in Texas in 1855 to John and Sarah Heath. His family moved to Louisiana while he was young. The family eventually returned to Texas and in 1875 Heath married Virginia Tennessee “Jennie” Ferrell. In 1882, Heath left Texas, settling first in Clifton, Arizona, where he opened a saloon. In November 1883, Heath moved to Bisbee with James "Tex" Howard. Along the way, Heath and Howard met friends of Howard: Dan "Big Dan" Dowd, Omer W. "Red" Sample, and Daniel "York" Kelly. As an adult, Heath was indicted for cattle rustling, robbery, burglary, and running a house of prostitution.

Bisbee didn't have a bank, and it was common knowledge that the $7,000 cash payroll (or about $242,000 today) for the Copper Queen Mine was delivered to the Goldwater & Castaneda Mercantile store one or two days in advance of the company's payday on the 10th of each month. Heath was later convicted of arranging for Cowboys Daniel W. "Big Dan" Dowd, Omer W. "Red" Sample, Daniel "York" Kelly, William E. "Billy" Delaney, and James "Tex" Howard to rob the store and payroll.

Before the robbery, Heath allegedly accompanied Howard and the three other men to Buckles' ranch, about 10 miles (16 km) outside Bisbee, although no witnesses were later found to corroborate Heath's role. Heath and Howard continued on to Bisbee on November 20, 1883. Heath immediately partnered with a local man named Nathan Waite and prepared to open a new dance hall. Howard returned to the Buckles' ranch and waited with his confederates. Heath and Waite opened their dance hall behind the Goldwater & Castaneda Mercantile general store on December 8, 1883, the day the Copper Queen Mine payroll usually arrived.

=== Robbery and murders ===
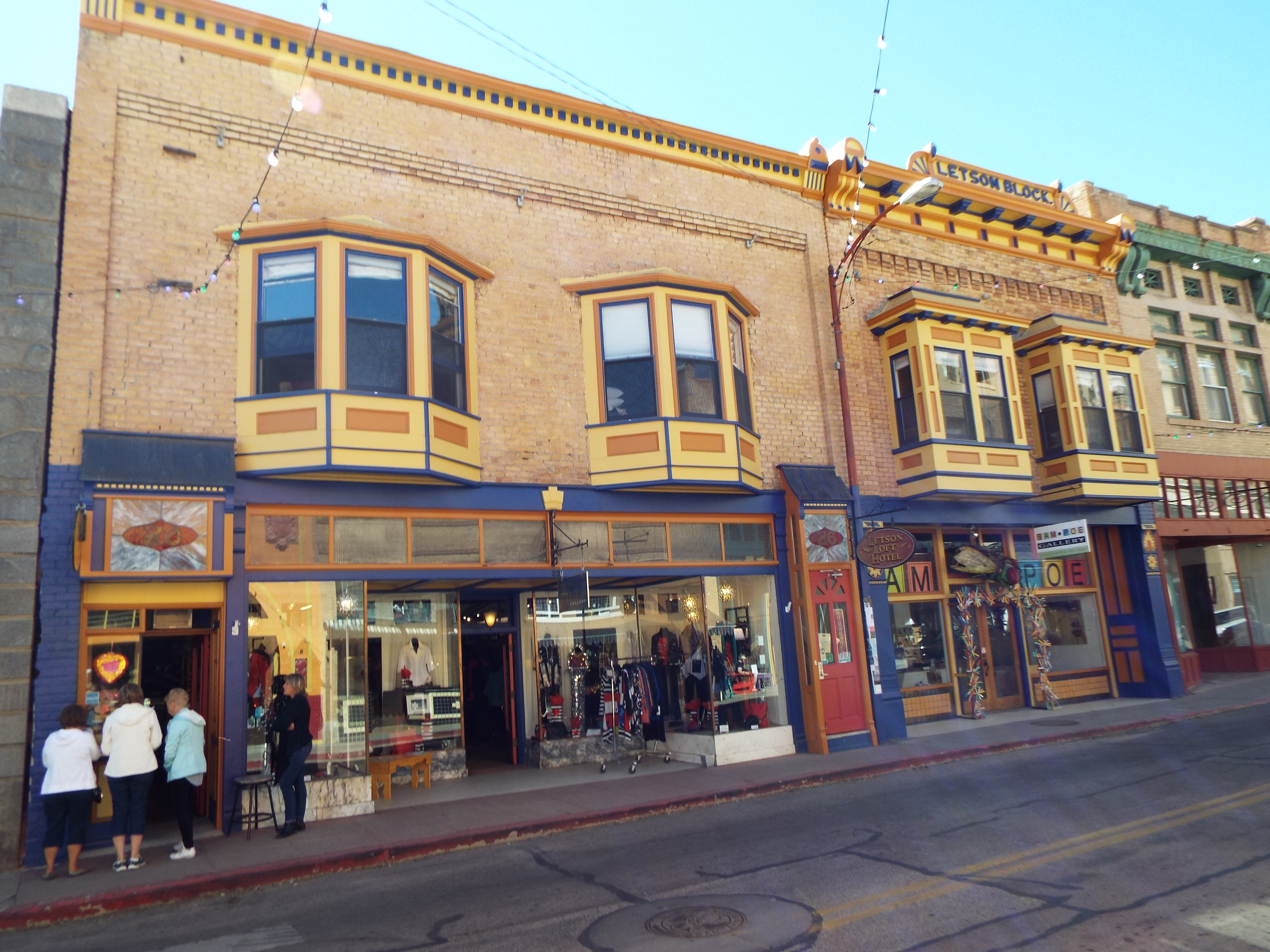
The Letson Loft Hotel (Letson Loft Block) located on 26 Main Street was where the Goldwater–Castaneda Mercantile Store was originally located. The building is listed in the National Register of Historic Places on July 3, 1980, as part of the Bisbee Historic District, reference#80004487.

On the evening of December 8, 1883, the five outlaws rode into Bisbee. They tied their horses near the Copper Queen Mine smelter at the end of Main Street and walked to the Goldwater and Castaneda store. "Tex" Howard, who wasn't wearing a mask, "York" Kelly, and "Billy" Delaney entered the store while the other two remained outside. They leveled pistols at the store owner and persuaded him to open the safe, only to find that the payroll had not yet arrived. The robbers took some cash and a gold watch in the safe and robbed all of the employees and customers in the store. Accounts differ as to how much money they stole, but it was reported they took between $800 and $3,000 in cash along with the gold watch and jewelry.

While the three Cowboys were inside looting the safe and robbing the customers, "Red" Sample and "Big Dan" Dowd, outside the store, were confronted by citizens who recognized that a robbery was in progress. When assayer J. C. Tappenier exited the Bon Ton Saloon next door, they ordered him to go back in. He refused and the robbers, armed with Winchester repeating rifles, killed him with a shot to the head. Cochise County Deputy Sheriff D. Tom Smith was having dinner with his wife across the street at the Bisbee House. He ran onto the street and the robbers ordered him to go back inside. Smith refused, and told them he was an officer of the law. One of the bandits reportedly said, "Then you are the one we want!" and killed him. He fell beneath a freight wagon. Annie Roberts, who was pregnant, came to the door of the Bisbee House restaurant, which she and her husband owned. The Cowboys shot her and the bullet shattered her spine, mortally wounding her. John A. Nolly, a local freighter, was standing near his wagon when he was shot in the chest. A local man, known only as "Indian Joe," was wounded in the leg as he was trying to escape the shooting. Nolly died later that evening, as did Roberts and her unborn child.

The robbers exited the store and ran for their horses, firing at anyone they saw. Deputy Sheriff William "Billy" Daniels, who had come from his saloon when he heard the shooting commence, emptied his revolver at the fleeing outlaws, but missed. The bandits mounted their horses and rode back up Main Street, over Mule Pass, and out of town. At Soldier's Hole, a site east of Bisbee, they divided the money and went their separate ways.

=== Posse captures suspects ===
The Copper Queen Mine offered a reward of $2,000 for the arrest and conviction of the Cowboys. Since four of the robbers wore masks, it was at first difficult to trace them.

Riders from Bisbee immediately left for the county seat in Tombstone to notify Cochise County Sheriff Jerome L. Ward. Deputy Daniels immediately formed two posses. The first posse immediately left in pursuit of the murderers. It included John Heath who was later convicted of planning the robbery. He rode with Nathan Waite and Henry Frost (a local gambler and acquaintance of John Heath). Waite and Heath were deputized by Daniels.

The second posse rode out after daybreak on December 9. Daniels' posse soon caught up with Heath's posse. During the manhunt, Heath noticed that the outlaws' tracks separated with three horsemen going east and the two others going south. Heath brought this to Daniels' attention, but Daniels didn't believe Heath. Heath, Waite, and Frost followed the southbound tracks and finally lost the trail of their quarry outside Tombstone. Daniels doggedly followed the other tracks and eventually lost that trail. He returned to Bisbee empty-handed.

Exhausted, the three men spent the night in Tombstone. Since Sheriff Ward was absent, they met with Under-Sheriff Wallace, and then returned to Bisbee. Heath and Waite were arrested the following day. Waite was released, but Heath was held in jail as a suspected accomplice. When Heath was tried for his role in the robbery, Daniels testified that Heath was trying to mislead the posse when he pointed out that the trail had split.

Because he had neglected to wear a mask, "Tex" Howard was quickly identified as one of the robbers. After further investigation, Deputy Daniels was able to determine the names of the other four men suspected of being involved. Suspicion fell upon Heath as he was acquainted with Howard and had been seen in the company of the other four men at Buckles' ranch. The first of the outlaws to be apprehended was Daniel "York" Kelly. Kelly was caught near Deming, New Mexico.

"Tex" Howard and "Red" Sample made the mistake of returning to their old haunts in Clifton, Arizona. While there, the outlaws visited with bartender Walter Bush. After the two men left town, Bush notified authorities. A posse was assembled and within a matter of days, Howard and Sample were captured and placed in jail. Daniel W. Dowd and William E. Delaney had, as Heath had seen by their horse tracks, left the others outside Bisbee and traveled to Sonora, Mexico. Dan Dowd was captured by Deputy Daniels across the Mexican border in Los Corralitos, Sonora. William Delaney was apprehended by Deputy Daniels with the aid of Deputy Sheriff Robert Hatch in the town of Minas Prietas, Sonora where he had been detained after getting in a brawl with a local mine foreman. Given the reward, Mexican authorities were glad to release him to the Americans.

=== Five Cowboys convicted ===
On February 6, the grand jury "found indictments against Dowd, Kelly, Sample, Howard and Delaney". The men appointed as their legal counsel included James B. Southard, Col. Stanford, Thomas J. Drum, F. V. Price, and Col. William Herring (father of Sarah Herring Sorin, one of Arizona's first female attorneys). The trial of the five suspected killers began in Tombstone on February 17, 1884. The evidence against the men was fairly conclusive. Four of the five of them had been recognized either during the robbery or as they ran from the mercantile. Additionally, there was a chain of physical and circumstantial evidence linking the men to the crime. The trial lasted only three days. After an hour's deliberation the jury brought back a verdict of guilty of first degree murder. On hearing the verdict, Daniel Kelly was reported to have remarked, "Well boys, hemp seems to be trumps". On February 18, after their motions for a new trial were quashed by Judge Daniel Pinney, the five outlaws were sentenced to be hanged by the neck until they were dead.

== John Heath convicted ==
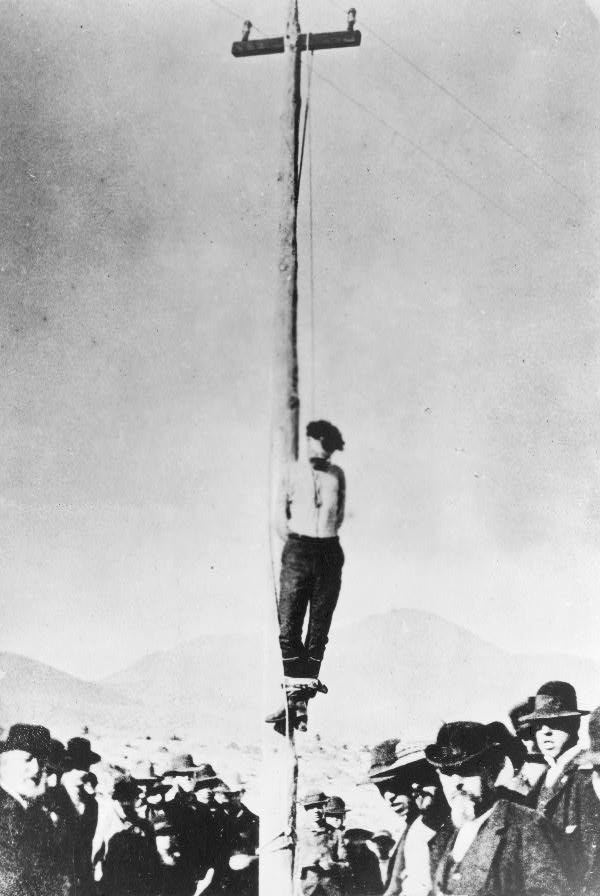
The lynching of John Heath on February 22, 1884

At his request, John Heath was tried separately beginning on February 12, 1884. He was represented by Colonel William Herring. The prosecutors could not produce a witness who could tie Heath to the robbery. Certainly he had known the outlaws previously, but proving he had conspired with them was problematic. Unable to produce a witness, County Attorney Marcus Aurelius Smith found a prisoner to testify against Heath. Sergeant L. D. Lawrence, of the 3rd Cavalry, had been indicted for killing two men during a saloon brawl in Willcox, Arizona, and had been incarcerated with Heath and the others since their arrest.

Sgt. Lawrence swore he had heard Heath and the outlaws discuss the robbery and how and why their plan had failed. Heath's attorney questioned Lawrence as to whether he had made a deal with County Attorney Smith to testify against Heath in exchange for a lighter sentence in his own case. Lawrence swore he had not but three months later, in May 1884, he was represented in his murder trial before Judge Pinney by Smith's private law firm. He was found guilty of the lesser crime of manslaughter and sentenced to only two years in the Yuma Territorial Prison.

The jury, which split several times over the verdict, with some calling for conviction and some calling for acquittal, finally chose a "compromise verdict" and convicted Heath of second degree murder. Judge Pinney sentenced him to life at the Yuma Territorial Prison.

=== Heath lynched ===
Some men of Cochise County were not satisfied. On February 22, a large lynch mob, reported as 50 to 150 men, mostly miners, armed themselves. They appointed a committee of seven men to enter the county jail in the Tombstone Courthouse and get Heath out. The jailer thought their knock was the Chinese cook bringing breakfast, and the seven men forced the sheriff and guards at the point of their guns to release Heath to them. The mob took Heath from the jail, leaving his five convicted associates who were scheduled to be executed in March. As the mob exited the courthouse with the prisoner, Sheriff Ward attempted to intervene. The mob pushed him aside.

The mob took Heath down Toughnut Street and lynched him from a telegraph pole at the corner of Second and Toughnut Streets. Heath's last words were:

Boys, you are hanging an innocent man, and you will find it out before those other men are hung. I have one favor to ask, that you will not mutilate my body by shooting into it after I am hung.

His executioners agreed. Heath was then blindfolded and the noose was placed around his neck. Members of the mob then pulled the rope until Heath was suspended beneath the pole, where he slowly strangled to death. When the body finally came to rest, someone placed a placard on the telegraph pole bearing the inscription:

JOHN HEITH

Was hanged to this pole by the
CITIZENS OF COCHISE COUNTY
for participating in the Bisbee massacre
as a proved accessory
AT 8:00 A.M., FEBRUARY 22, 1884
(Washington’s Birthday)
ADVANCE ARIZONA!

=== Newspaper accounts ===
The lynching at Tombstone was covered nationally, reported by The New York Times and the Chicago Tribune as well as by western newspapers. The February 24, 1884 issue of the Times reported:

... At 9 o'clock on Thursday morning Judge Pinney sentenced John to confinement in Yuma Penitentiary for life for complicity in the Bisbee murders. Twenty-four hours later the dead body of Heath dangled from the cross bar of a telegraph pole near the foot of Toughnut Street, where it was suspended by a rope...
The seven men approached the door leading to the corridor of the jail and...
Jailer Ward opened the door unsuspiciously, and was immediately covered by weapons and told to give up the keys of the jail. Seeing any attempt at resistance would be useless he did as requested, and in a few minutes the deputation was in the presence of the sought-for man...
Arriving at the place selected for the hanging one of the party climbed a telegraph pole and passed the rope over the cross-bar. Heath pulled a handkerchief from his pocket and, placing it on his knee, coolly and deliberately folded it, and, placing it over his eyes, asked someone in the crowd to tie it.

Heath restated his innocence before the crowd put the rope around his neck and hoisted him off his feet. The mob left Heath "hanging for half an hour, when he was cut down". After his death, Heath was described as "a notorious gambler, burglar, horse and cattle thief" on February 28, 1884, by The Kaufman Sun in his home town of Terrell, Texas.

=== Coroner's verdict ===
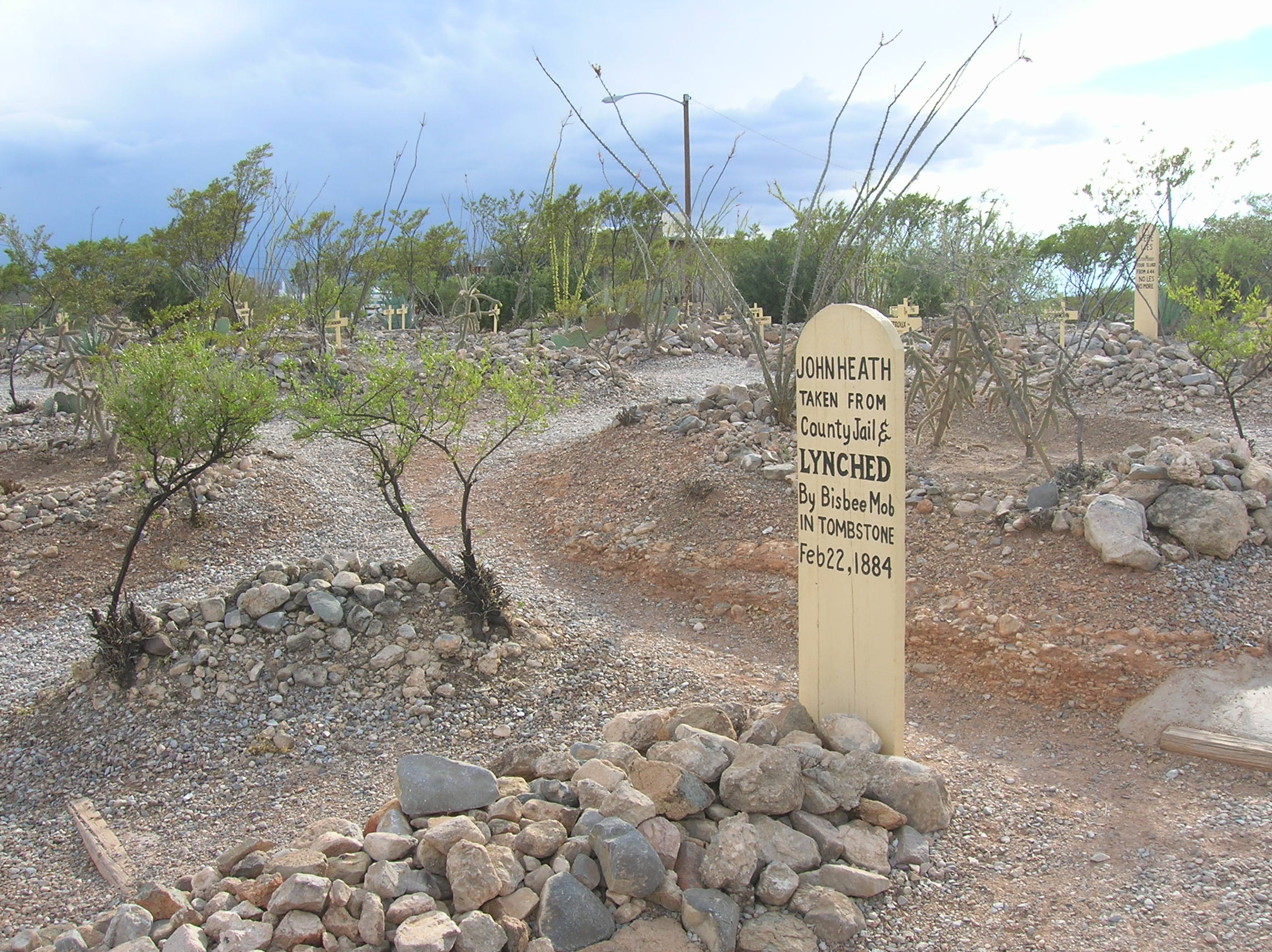
The grave marker for John Heath at the Boothill Graveyard in Tombstone, Arizona

Dr. George E. Goodfellow, who had witnessed Heath's hanging, was County Coroner and responsible for determining the cause of death. His conclusion reflected the popular sentiment of the town. He ruled that Heath died from "...emphysema of the lungs which might have been, and probably was, caused by strangulation, self-inflicted or otherwise, as in accordance with the medical evidence."

While a grave marker for John Heath is currently located in the Tombstone Boothill Graveyard, his body was returned to his family in Terrell, Texas, where he was buried at the Oakland Cemetery in an unmarked grave.

== Remaining five executed ==
After the trial and conviction of the five bandits, residents celebrated the day of their execution in March 1884. Sheriff Ward sent out invitations to a select number of people to view the hanging, In addition, a local businessman erected a grandstand of his own outside the jailyard and began selling tickets at $1.50 per seat. Nellie Cashman, a local philanthropist, was disgusted when she learned of these plans. She protested to Sheriff Ward, but he would not act. On the day before the executions, she and others she recruited chopped up the grandstand. During this row, seven people were injured, one breaking a leg and another an arm.

According to the Tombstone Epitaph, about 1,000 persons witnessed the hangings. A special gallows was built that could accommodate all five of the outlaws. On the morning of their execution, they were shaved and dressed in matching black suits. Sheriff Ward allowed them to walk unfettered to the gibbet and to wear their hats. Once on the platform, the men were bound again. Each of the bandits protested his innocence and that of Heath, who had been lynched a month earlier.

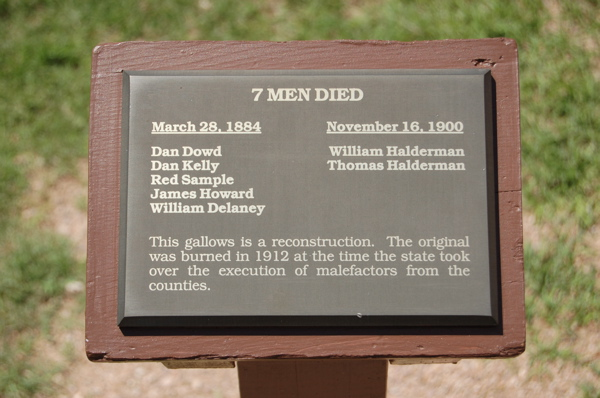
A plaque at the Tombstone Courthouse State Historic Park listing the names of the men hanged in Tombstone

Having converted to Catholicism during their tenure in the county jail, the outlaws asked for their bodies to be delivered to the local Roman Catholic priest, Father Gallagher. Their hats were then taken from them and black hoods pulled down over their heads. The nooses were subsequently adjusted around their necks. It was then that Daniel "York" Kelly, his voice muffled by the hood which covered his features, said, "Let her go!" On March 28, 1884, at 1:18 p.m. James "Tex" Howard, Dan "Big Dan" Dowd, William Delaney (or DeLaney), Omer W. "Red" Sample, and Kelly were executed. They were dropped together and, except for Dowd, died quickly. Dowd's body was seen to twitch and jerk for several minutes as he strangled to death. The bodies of the Bisbee bandits were allowed to hang there in the early spring air for nearly half an hour before they were officially pronounced dead. Then, at 1:45 p.m. the corpses were cut down and “placed in neat but plain coffins” and conveyed to the city morgue, where they were each identified in turn by Gallagher.

Learning that a medical school intended to exhume the bandits' corpses for research, Cashman intervened, hiring two miners to guard the graves of the bandits for ten days. A joint gravestone marks the graves of the five executed bandits, which can still be seen in Tombstone.

== Current graves ==
The following are the images, as of 2017, of the individual graves of Dan Dowd, William E. Delaney, Daniel Kelley, James Howard and Omer W. Sample in Boot Hill Graveyard in Tombstone.

The Current graves of the 5 Bisbee Massacre outlaws

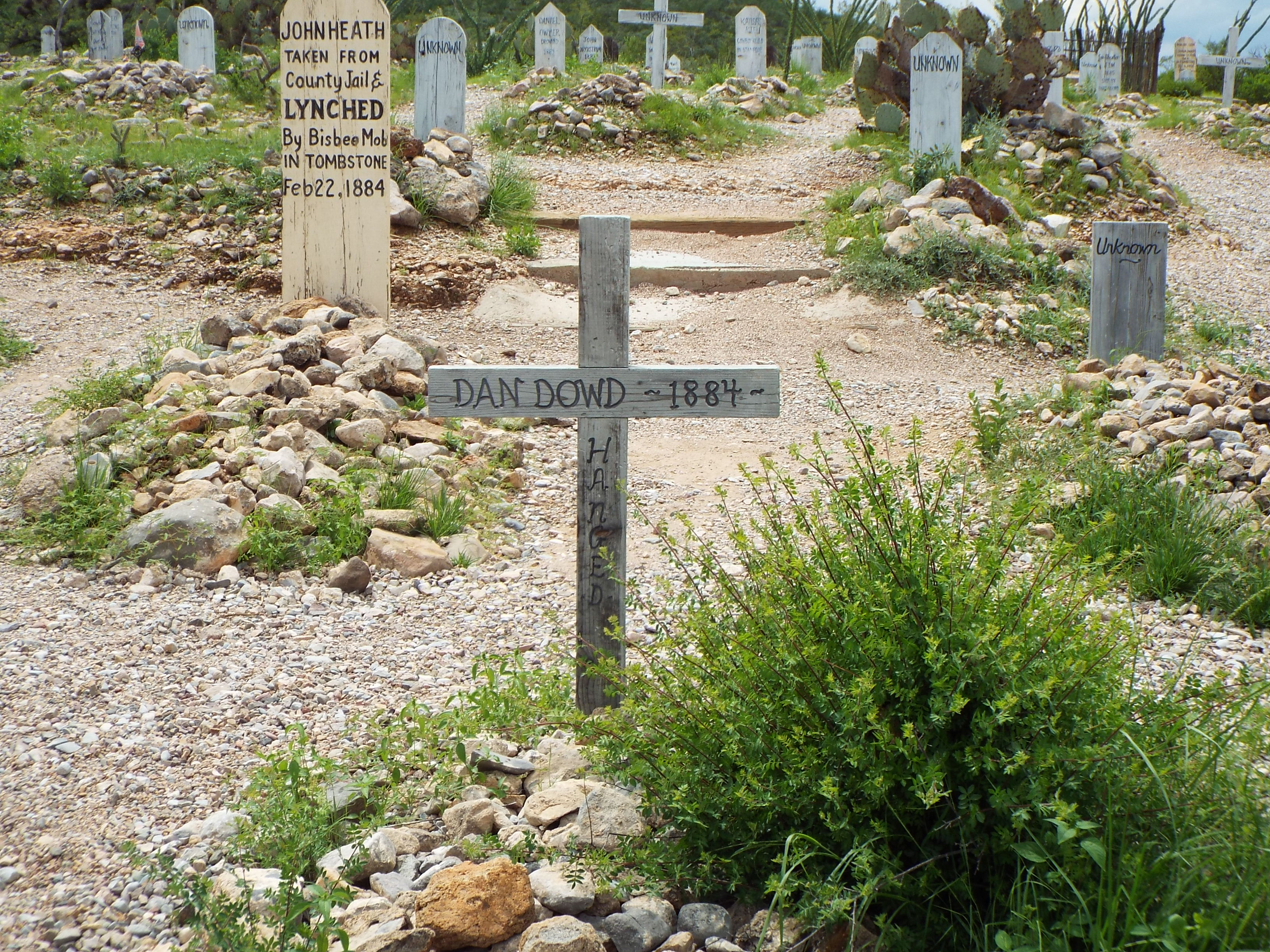
Dan "Big Dan" Dowd

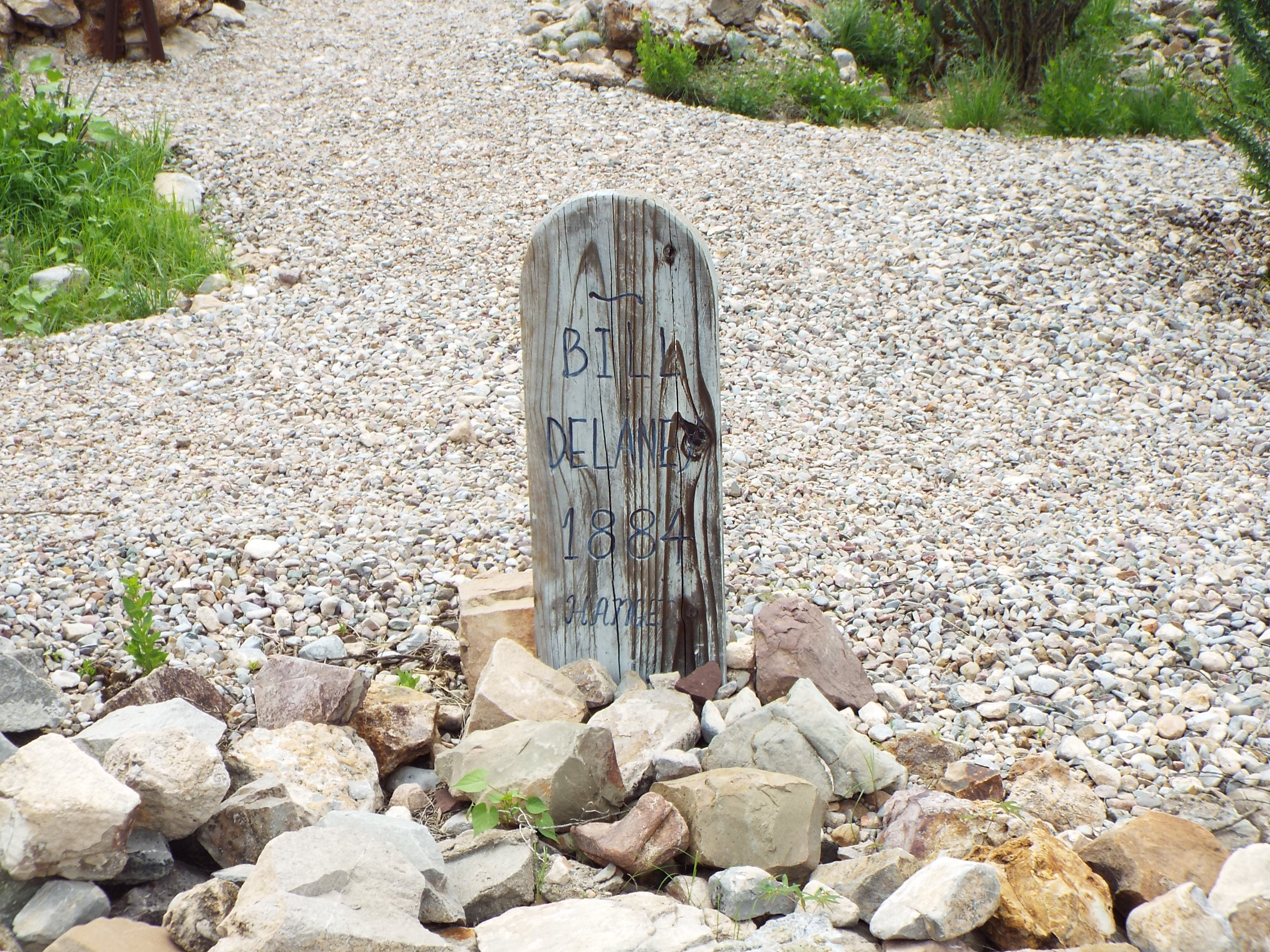
William E. "Billy" Delaney

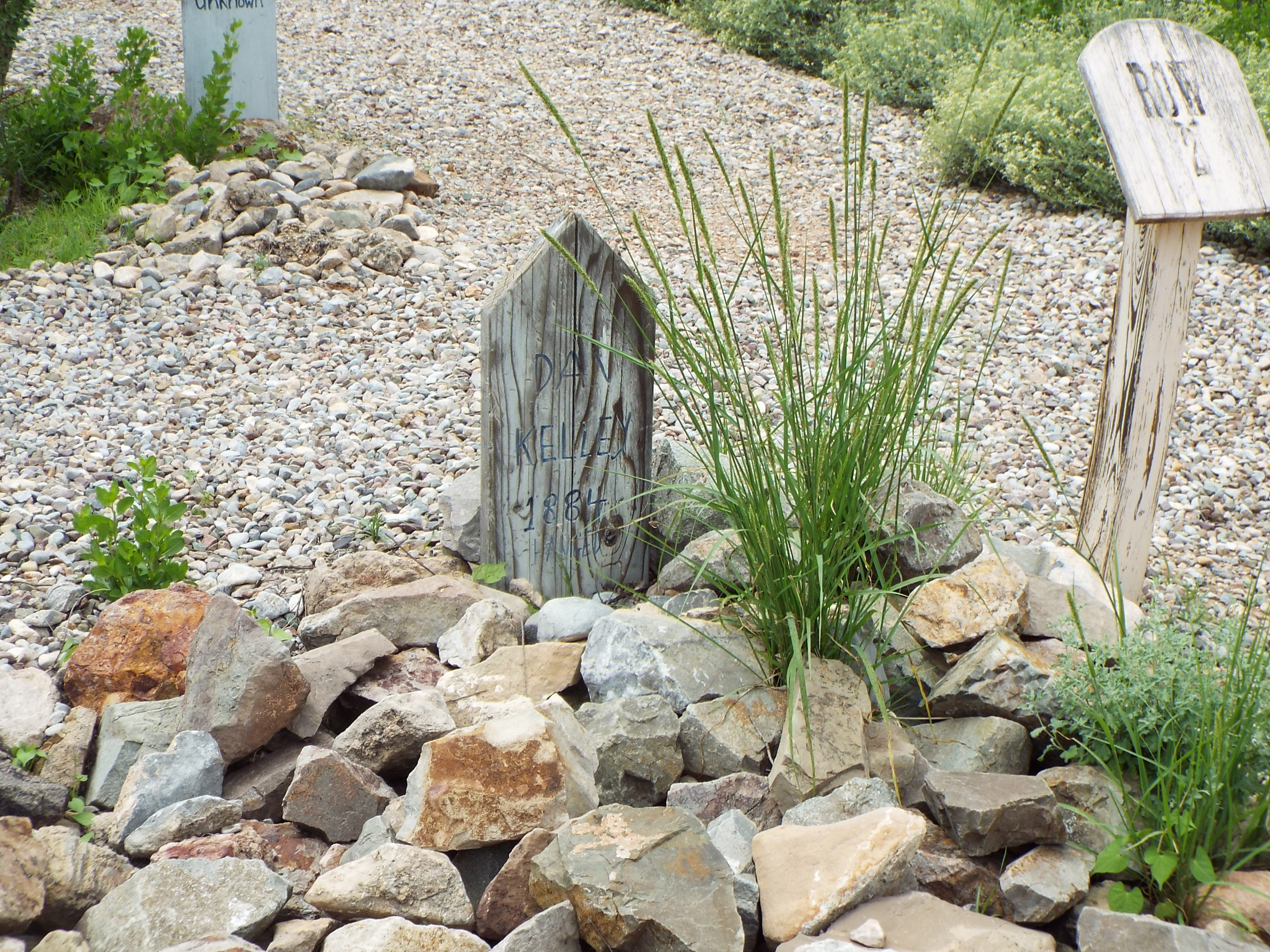
Daniel "York" Kelley

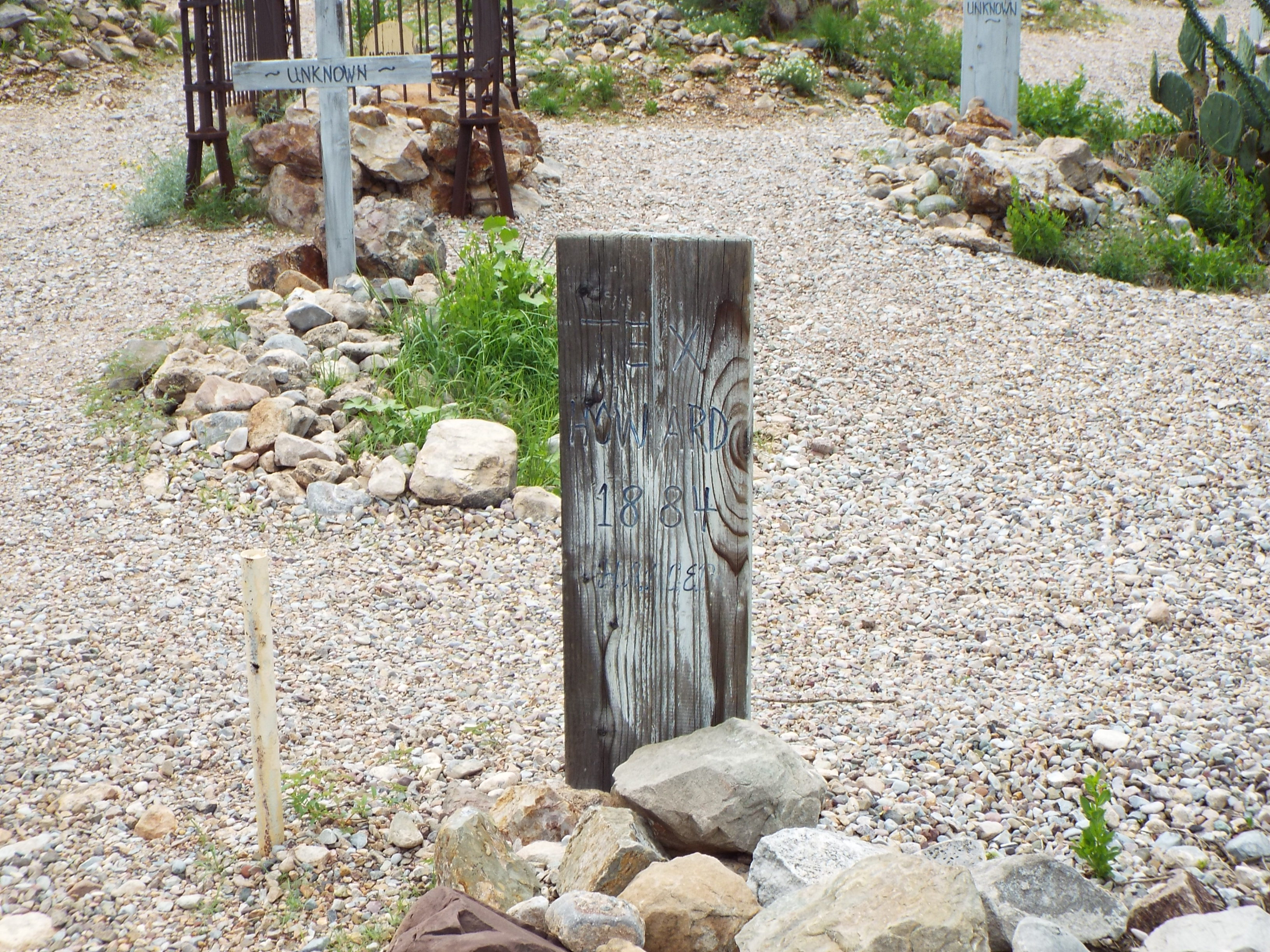
James "Tex" Howard

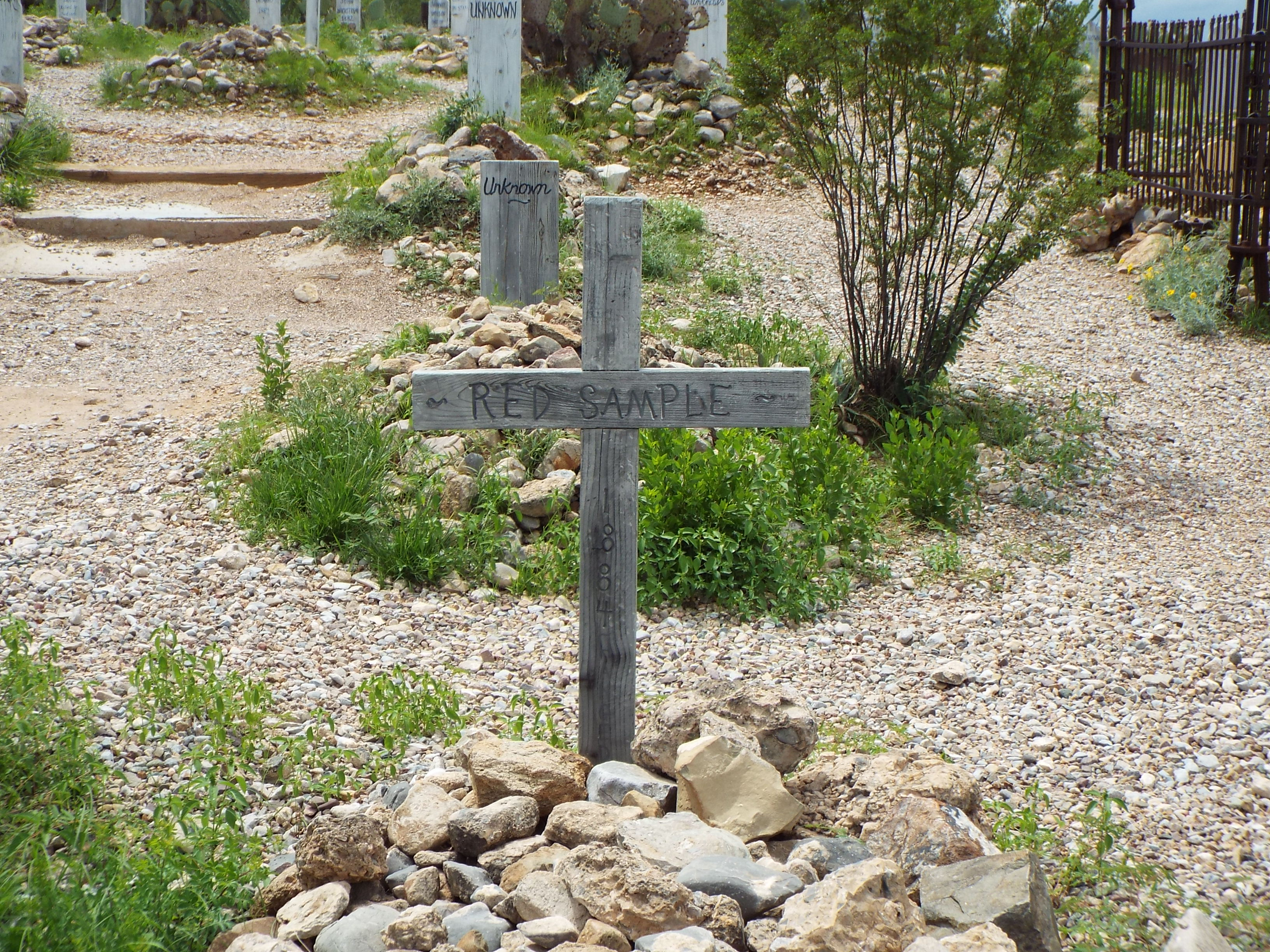
Omer W. "Red" Sample

== See also ==
- List of massacres in Arizona
- Lynching in the United States
- Cochise County in the Old West
