= 10th Arizona State Legislature =

Session of the Arizona Legislature

←	9th	11th	→
- Arizona State Capitol (2014)

Overview
- Legislative body: Arizona State Legislature
- Jurisdiction: Arizona, United States
- Term: January 1, 1931 – December 31, 1932

Senate
- Members: 19
- President: Fred Sutter (D)
- Party control: Democratic (18–1)

House of Representatives
- Members: 63
- Speaker: M. J. Hannon (D)
- Party control: Democratic (51–12)

Sessions
- 1st: January 12 – March 14, 1931

The 10th Arizona State Legislature, consisting of the Arizona State Senate and the Arizona House of Representatives, was constituted from January 1, 1931, to December 31, 1932, during the first and second years of George W. P. Hunt's seventh tenure as Governor of Arizona, in Phoenix. The number of senators remained constant at 19, while the number of representatives increased from 54 to 63. The Democrats increased the large majorities they held in both houses.

== Sessions ==
The Legislature met for the regular session at the State Capitol in Phoenix on January 12, 1931; and adjourned on March 14.

There were no special sessions of this legislature during 1931 and 1932.

== State Senate ==
=== Members ===
The asterisk (*) denotes members of the previous Legislature who continued in office as members of this Legislature.

County	Senator	Party	Notes
Apache	T. J. Bouldin	Democratic	
Cochise	Fred Sutter*	Democratic	
Cochise	John P. Cull	Democratic	
Coconino	W. W. Midgley	Republican	
Gila	Alfred Kinney*	Democratic	
Gila	E. H. McEachren*	Democratic	
Graham	W. B. Kelley	Democratic	
Greenlee	Harry W. Hill*	Democratic	
Maricopa	Joe C. Haldiman	Democratic	
Maricopa	Frank T. Pomeroy	Democratic	
Mohave	J. H. (Hubert) Smith	Democratic	
Navajo	G. W. Nelson*	Democratic	
Pima	T. W. Donnelly*	Democratic	
Pima	Thomas Collins	Democratic	
Pinal	R. T. (Bob) Jones	Democratic	
Santa Cruz	C. C. Crenshaw	Democratic	
Yavapai	A. H. Favour*	Democratic	
Yavapai	J. R. McFarland*	Democratic	Resigned, was replaced by John Francis Connor
Yavapai	John Francis Connor	Democratic	Appointed to replace J.R. McFarland
Yuma	Hugo Farmer*	Democratic	

=== Employees ===
The following held unelected positions within the Legislature:

- Secretary: William J. Graham
- Assistant Secretary: B. F. Thum
- Sergeant-at-Arms: D. B. McHenry
- Chaplain: Dan P. Jones

== House of Representatives ==
=== Members ===
The asterisk (*) denotes members of the previous Legislature who continued in office as members of this Legislature. The House grew by nine seats from the 9th Legislature: 5 in Maricopa County, 2 in Pima County, and 1 each in Gila and Yuma counties.

County	Representative	Party	Notes
Apache	P. I. Ashcroft	Republican	
Cochise	W. E. Oxsheer*	Democratic	
Cochise	J. E. Bevan	Democratic	
Cochise	Thomas Cowperthwaite*	Democratic	
Cochise	James W. Baker	Democratic	
Cochise	A. E. Hinton*	Democratic	
Cochise	D. A. Adam	Democratic	
Cochise	William Coxon*	Democratic	
Coconino	T. H. Cureton	Republican	
Coconino	Howard Marine*	Republican	
Gila	John McCormick*	Democratic	
Gila	J. T. Lewis*	Democratic	
Gila	William G. Rosenbaum*	Democratic	
Gila	Roy F. Kelly*	Democratic	
Graham	Jesse A. Udall	Republican	
Graham	Joseph H. Lines	Democratic	
Greenlee	M. J. Hannon*	Democratic	
Greenlee	W. T. Witt*	Democratic	
Maricopa	J. R. Barnette*	Democratic	
Maricopa	J. T. Bone	Democratic	
Maricopa	Hugh Callahan	Democratic	
Maricopa	H. C. Caveness	Democratic	
Maricopa	M. V. Decker *	Democratic	
Maricopa	L. O. DuRoss	Democratic	
Maricopa	M. J. Francis*	Democratic	Died in office
Maricopa	Mary Francis	Democratic	Appointed to replace M. J. Francis
Maricopa	J. F. Jennings*	Democratic	
Maricopa	Renz L. Jennings	Democratic	
Maricopa	Conner Johnson	Democratic	
Maricopa	Gertrude Bryan Leeper	Democratic	
Maricopa	J. Lee Loveless*	Democratic	
Maricopa	C. A. McKee	Democratic	
Maricopa	Albert L. Peck	Democratic	
Maricopa	J. J. Phillips	Democratic	
Maricopa	Bridgie Porter	Democratic	
Maricopa	L. Alton Riggs	Democratic	
Maricopa	W. L. Rigney	Democratic	
Maricopa	James B. Sayers	Democratic	
Maricopa	T. B. Stewart	Democratic	
Maricopa	D. R. Van Petten*	Republican	
Maricopa	William Walton	Republican	
Mohave	Anson H. Smith*	Democratic	
Navajo	Marshall H. Flake	Republican	
Navajo	Charle G. McQuillan*	Republican	
Pima	C. T. Reddington*	Democratic	
Pima	John H. Rapp	Democratic	
Pima	Thomas Malony*	Democratic	
Pima	D. M. Penny	Democratic	
Pima	August Wieden	Democratic	
Pima	Oliver B. Patton*	Democratic	
Pima	Thomas D. Tway	Democratic	
Pima	Kenneth K. Suber	Democratic	
Pinal	H. J. Valentine	Democratic	
Pinal	Thomas S. Richards	Democratic	
Santa Cruz	Edwin F. Bohlinger	Democratic	
Yavapai	Annie C. Jones*	Democratic	
Yavapai	S. A. Spear	Democratic	
Yavapai	F. L. Benham*	Republican	
Yavapai	V. C. Wiggins	Republican	
Yavapai	Grant H. Merrill	Democratic	
Yuma	Nellie T. Bush	Democratic	
Yuma	A. W. Johnson*	Republican	
Yuma	John Doan*	Republican	

=== Employees ===
The following held unelected positions within the Legislature:

- Chief Clerk: Lallah Ruth
- Assistant Chief Clerk: Ruby Coulter
- Sergeant-at-Arms: Jack Provost
- Chaplain: Reverend C. M. Burkhart
