= 11th Arizona State Legislature =

Session of the Arizona Legislature

←	10th	12th	→
- Arizona State Capitol (2014)

Overview
- Legislative body: Arizona State Legislature
- Jurisdiction: Arizona, United States
- Term: January 1, 1933 – December 31, 1934

Senate
- Members: 19
- President: Harry W. Hill (D)
- Party control: Democratic (19–0)

House of Representatives
- Members: 63
- Speaker: S. A. Spear (D)
- Party control: Democratic (59–4)

Sessions
- 1st: January 9 – March 14, 1933

Special sessions
- 1st: unknown – unknown
- 2nd: unknown – unknown
- 3rd: November 26 – December 14, 1934

The 11th Arizona State Legislature, consisting of the Arizona State Senate and the Arizona House of Representatives, was constituted from January 1, 1933, to December 31, 1934, during Benjamin Baker Moeur's first term as Governor of Arizona, in Phoenix. The number in both houses remained constant, with 19 senators and 63 representatives. The Democrats held every seat in the Senate, and increased the large majority they held the house.

== Sessions ==
The Legislature met for the regular session at the State Capitol in Phoenix on January 12, 1933; and adjourned on March 14. There were 3 special sessions of this legislature during 1933–34. The third special session ran from November 26 – December 14, 1934.

== State Senate ==
=== Members ===
The asterisk (*) denotes members of the previous Legislature who continued in office as members of this Legislature.

County	Senator	Party	Notes
Apache	Dodd L. Greer	Democratic	
Cochise	John C. Riggs	Democratic	
Cochise	Dan Angius	Democratic	
Coconino	Earl C. Slipher	Democratic	
Gila	John P. Dougherty	Democratic	
Gila	E. H. McEachren*	Democratic	
Graham	W. B. Kelley*	Democratic	
Greenlee	Harry W. Hill*	Democratic	
Maricopa	James Minotto	Democratic	
Maricopa	Frank T. Pomeroy*	Democratic	
Mohave	Kean St. Charles	Democratic	
Navajo	Frank M. Siegmund	Democratic	
Pima	E. T. Houston	Democratic	
Pima	Thomas Collins*	Democratic	
Pinal	R. T. (Bob) Jones*	Democratic	
Santa Cruz	J. A. Harrison	Democratic	
Yavapai	John Francis Connor*	Democratic	
Yavapai	Perry McArthur	Democratic	
Yuma	Hugo Farmer*	Democratic	

=== Employees ===
The following held unelected positions within the Legislature:

- Secretary: William J. Graham
- Sergeant-at-Arms: Frank J. Gillick
- Chaplain: Thomas C. Harris

== House of Representatives ==
=== Members ===
The asterisk (*) denotes members of the previous Legislature who continued in office as members of this Legislature.

County	Representative	Party	Notes
Apache	Fred Colter	Democratic	
Cochise	W. E. Oxsheer*	Democratic	
Cochise	J. E. Bevan*	Democratic	
Cochise	Martin L. Armstrong	Democratic	
Cochise	I. B. Ward	Democratic	
Cochise	E. F. Vickers	Democratic	
Cochise	E. P. A. Larrieu	Democratic	
Cochise	Vernon G. Davis	Democratic	
Coconino	James E. Babbitt	Democratic	
Coconino	L. S. Williams	Democratic	
Gila	James R. Heron	Democratic	
Gila	Howard Sprouse	Democratic	
Gila	William G. Rosenbaum*	Democratic	
Gila	Roy F. Kelly*	Democratic	
Gila	Walter J. Randall	Democratic	
Graham	Jesse A. Udall*	Republican	
Graham	Fred Webb	Democratic	
Greenlee	W. J. Williams	Democratic	
Greenlee	W. T. Witt*	Democratic	
Maricopa	Bert C. Armstrong	Democratic	
Maricopa	Frank W. Beer	Democratic	Appointed after the resignation of J. Lee Loveless
Maricopa	Hugh Callahan*	Democratic	
Maricopa	G. L. Christian	Democratic	
Maricopa	J. W. Combs	Democratic	
Maricopa	M. V. Decker *	Democratic	
Maricopa	Nat M. Dysart	Democratic	Died in office
Maricopa	Walter I. Ettleman	Democratic	Died in office
Maricopa	Mary Francis*	Democratic	
Maricopa	Lewis Irvine	Democratic	
Maricopa	Charles E. Jennings	Democratic	
Maricopa	Conner Johnson*	Democratic	
Maricopa	George A. Johnson	Democratic	
Maricopa	Hugh E. Laird	Democratic	
Maricopa	Charles E. Mincks	Democratic	
Maricopa	W. R. Palmer	Democratic	
Maricopa	J. J. Phillips*	Democratic	
Maricopa	Bridgie Porter*	Democratic	
Maricopa	M. G. Pratt	Democratic	
Maricopa	E. R. Pryor	Democratic	
Maricopa	L. Alton Riggs*	Democratic	
Maricopa	James B. Sayers*	Democratic	
Maricopa	J. C. Wilson	Democratic	
Mohave	Joseph M. Peggs*	Democratic	
Navajo	T. C. Hoyt	Republican	
Navajo	Charle G. McQuillan*	Republican	
Pima	Vern Priser	Democratic	
Pima	John H. Rapp*	Democratic	
Pima	William Wisdom	Democratic	
Pima	John M. Nugent	Democratic	
Pima	August Wieden*	Democratic	
Pima	B. J. O'Neill	Democratic	
Pima	Thomas D. Tway*	Democratic	
Pima	Kenneth K. Suber*	Democratic	
Pinal	George P. Sellers	Democratic	
Pinal	Thomas S. Richards*	Democratic	
Santa Cruz	Edwin F. Bohlinger*	Democratic	
Yavapai	C. Leo Guynn	Democratic	
Yavapai	S. A. Spear*	Democratic	
Yavapai	Annie Campbell Jones	Democratic	
Yavapai	V. C. Wiggins*	Republican	
Yavapai	Ralph A. Lyke	Democratic	
Yuma	Nellie T. Bush*	Democratic	
Yuma	William Wisener	Democratic	
Yuma	Ray C. Bennett*	Democratic	

=== Employees ===
The following held unelected positions within the Legislature:

- Chief Clerk: Lallah Ruth
- Assistant Chief Clerk: Ruby Coulter
- Sergeant-at-Arms: Thomas Cowperthwaite
- Chaplain: Reverend Thomas C. Harris
