= 12th Arizona State Legislature =

Session of the Arizona Legislature

←	11th	13th	→
- Arizona State Capitol (2014)

Overview
- Legislative body: Arizona State Legislature
- Jurisdiction: Arizona, United States
- Term: January 1, 1935 – December 31, 1936

Senate
- Members: 19
- President: Neil Kilmartin (D)
- Party control: Democratic (18–1)

House of Representatives
- Members: 51
- Speaker: Thomas D. Tway (D)
- Party control: Democratic (51–0)

Sessions
- 1st: January 14 – March 21, 1935

Special sessions
- 1st: November 26 – December 14, 1936

The 12th Arizona State Legislature, consisting of the Arizona State Senate and the Arizona House of Representatives, was constituted from January 1, 1935, to December 31, 1936, during Benjamin Baker Moeur's second term as Governor of Arizona, in Phoenix. The number of senators remained constant, while the number of representatives in the house decreased from 63 to 51. The Republicans broke the Democrats complete domination in the senate, managing to obtain a single seat, that of Apache County, however the house was entirely in Democratic hands.

== Sessions ==
The Legislature met for the Non regular session at the State Capitol in Phoenix on January 14, 1935; and adjourned on March 21. There was a special session which ran from November 5–24, 1936.

== State Senate ==
=== Members ===
The asterisk (*) denotes members of the previous Legislature who continued in office as members of this Legislature.

County	Senator	Party	Notes
Apache	Bryant Whiting	Republican	
Cochise	Joe S. Hunt	Democratic	
Cochise	Dan Angius*	Democratic	
Coconino	Clyde Stauffer	Democratic	
Gila	Daniel E. Rienhardt	Democratic	
Gila	E. H. McEachren*	Democratic	
Graham	Aaron Nelson	Democratic	
Greenlee	Peter Riley	Democratic	
Maricopa	George A. Johnson	Democratic	
Maricopa	Joe C. Haldiman	Democratic	President
Mohave	J. Hubert Smith	Democratic	
Navajo	G. W. Nelson	Democratic	
Pima	E. T. Houston*	Democratic	
Pima	Thomas Collins*	Democratic	
Pinal	Peter H. Ethington	Democratic	
Santa Cruz	J. A. Harrison*	Democratic	
Yavapai	Paul C. Keefe	Democratic	
Yavapai	W. E. Patterson	Democratic	
Yuma	Nellie T. Bush	Democratic	

=== Employees ===
The following held unelected positions within the Legislature:

- Secretary: William J. Graham
- Sergeant-at-Arms: Frank J. Gillick
- Chaplain: Reverend T. T. Hughes
- Chaplain: Reverend Perry McArthur

== House of Representatives ==
=== Members ===
The asterisk (*) denotes members of the previous Legislature who continued in office as members of this Legislature. The House shrank by twelve seats from the 11th Legislature: 4 in Maricopa County, 2 each in Cochise and Gila counties, and 1 each in Greenlee, Pima, Yavapai and Yuma counties.

County	Representative	Party	Notes
Apache	Don R. Patterson	Democratic	
Cochise	David J. Marks	Democratic	
Cochise	Frank Bowling	Democratic	
Cochise	M. A. Gray	Democratic	
Cochise	Frank W. Sharpe Jr.	Democratic	
Cochise	Vernon G. Davis*	Democratic	
Coconino	James E. Babbitt*	Democratic	
Coconino	L. S. Williams*	Democratic	
Gila	James R. Heron*	Democratic	
Gila	William G. Rosenbaum*	Democratic	
Gila	Ben H. Franklin	Democratic	
Graham	Frank Skinner	Democratic	
Graham	Fred Webb*	Democratic	
Greenlee	Matt Danenhauer	Democratic	
Maricopa	Bert C. Armstrong*	Democratic	
Maricopa	George A. Batchelder	Democratic	
Maricopa	Guy C. Chisum	Democratic	
Maricopa	M. E. Curry	Democratic	
Maricopa	William F. Gillett	Democratic	
Maricopa	J. Melvin Goodson	Democratic	
Maricopa	Raymond S. Hill	Democratic	
Maricopa	Tom J. Imler	Democratic	
Maricopa	Philip A. Isley	Democratic	
Maricopa	J. E. Love	Democratic	
Maricopa	W. R. Palmer*	Democratic	
Maricopa	William Petersen	Democratic	
Maricopa	Bridgie Porter*	Democratic	
Maricopa	M. G. Pratt*	Democratic	
Maricopa	L. Alton Riggs*	Democratic	
Maricopa	Harry J. Sullivan	Democratic	
Maricopa	C. T. Thompson	Democratic	
Maricopa	J. C. Wilson*	Democratic	
Mohave	Robert E. Morrow	Democratic	
Navajo	James Petersen	Democratic	
Navajo	Oren L. Murray	Democratic	
Pima	Justo A. Chavez	Democratic	
Pima	John H. Rapp*	Democratic	
Pima	William Wisdom*	Democratic	
Pima	C. W. Gardner	Democratic	
Pima	D. M. Penny	Democratic	
Pima	B. J. O'Neill*	Democratic	
Pima	Thomas D. Tway*	Democratic	
Pinal	R. W. Kenworthy	Democratic	
Pinal	Thomas S. Richards*	Democratic	
Santa Cruz	Edwin F. Bohlinger*	Democratic	
Yavapai	John H. Orthel	Democratic	
Yavapai	V. A. Reichard	Democratic	
Yavapai	Philemon G. Steinel	Democratic	
Yavapai	Harry J. Mader	Democratic	
Yuma	Bernard T. Caine	Democratic	
Yuma	William Wisener*	Democratic	

=== Employees ===
The following held unelected positions within the Legislature:

- Chief Clerk: Lallah Ruth
- Assistant Chief Clerk: Ruby Coulter
- Sergeant-at-Arms: Henry Hilbers
- Chaplain: Reverend Cecil Harris
