= Senator McFarland (disambiguation) =

Ernest McFarland (1894–1984) was a U.S. Senator from Arizona from 1941 to 1953. Senator McFarland may also refer to:

- Basil McFarland (1898–1986), Northern Irish Senate
- David McFarland (politician) (1822–1902), Wisconsin State Senate
- J. R. McFarland (fl. 1920s–1930s), Arizona State Senate
- James T. McFarland (1930–2015), New York State Senate
- Jim McFarland (1947–2020), Nebraska State Senate
- Noah C. McFarland (1822–1897), Ohio State Senate and Kansas State Senate

== See also ==
- Senator McFarlane (disambiguation)
