= 15th Arizona State Legislature =

Session of the Arizona Legislature

←	14th	16th	→
- Arizona State Capitol (2014)

Overview
- Legislative body: Arizona State Legislature
- Jurisdiction: Arizona, United States
- Term: January 1, 1941 – December 31, 1942

Senate
- Members: 19
- Party control: Democratic (19–0)

House of Representatives
- Members: 52
- Party control: Democratic (52–0)

Sessions
- 1st: January 13 – March 17, 1941

Special sessions
- 1st: April 6 – April 25, 1942

The 15th Arizona State Legislature, consisting of the Arizona State Senate and the Arizona House of Representatives, was constituted in Phoenix from January 1, 1941, to December 31, 1942, during the first of Sidney Preston Osborn's four consecutive terms as Governor of Arizona. The number of senators and house representatives remained constant at 19 and 52, respectively. The Democrats controlled one hundred percent of both the senate and house seats.

== Sessions ==
The Legislature met for the regular session at the State Capitol in Phoenix on January 13, 1941; and adjourned on March 17. There was a special session which was held from April 6–25, 1942.

== State Senate ==
=== Members ===
The asterisk (*) denotes members of the previous Legislature who continued in office as members of this Legislature.

County	Senator	Party	Notes
Apache	Bert J. Colter	Democratic	
Cochise	Ralph Cowan*	Democratic	
Cochise	Dan Angius*	Democratic	
Coconino	James E. Babbitt*	Democratic	
Gila	S. L. Bixby*	Democratic	
Gila	A. R. Edwards*	Democratic	
Graham	Benjamin Blake*	Democratic	
Greenlee	A. C. Stanton*	Democratic	
Maricopa	Joe C. Haldiman	Democratic	
Maricopa	Marvin E. Smith	Democratic	
Mohave	J. Hubert Smith	Democratic	
Navajo	Lloyd C. Henning	Democratic	
Pima	H. H. d'Autremont	Democratic	
Pima	William Kimball	Democratic	
Pinal	William Coxon*	Democratic	
Santa Cruz	James A. Harrison	Democratic	
Yavapai	Paul C. Keefe*	Democratic	
Yavapai	Norman Fain	Democratic	
Yuma	H. H. Baker*	Democratic	

== House of Representatives ==
=== Members ===
The asterisk (*) denotes members of the previous Legislature who continued in office as members of this Legislature. The size of the House remained constant at 52 members.

County	Representative	Party	Notes
Apache	Walter Pulsipher*	Democratic	
Cochise	Neal L. Vinson	Democratic	
Cochise	Howard McKinney*	Democratic	
Cochise	H. J. Lewis	Democratic	
Cochise	Frank W. Sharpe Jr.*	Democratic	
Cochise	E. B. McAleb*	Democratic	
Coconino	Frank L. Christensen	Democratic	
Coconino	Charles F. Wade*	Democratic	
Gila	James R. Heron*	Democratic	
Gila	William G. Rosenbaum*	Democratic	
Gila	Harold Copp*	Democratic	
Graham	J. W. Greenhalgh*	Democratic	
Graham	Warner B. Mattice*	Democratic	
Greenlee	Fred J. Fritz*	Democratic	
Maricopa	H. C. Armstrong	Democratic	
Maricopa	M. R. Bailey	Democratic	
Maricopa	Cecil A. Bell*	Democratic	
Maricopa	Maxine P. Brubaker	Democratic	
Maricopa	C. J. Carreon*	Democratic	
Maricopa	Fred T. Colter	Democratic	
Maricopa	M. E. Curry*	Democratic	
Maricopa	R. F. Kilpatrick	Democratic	
Maricopa	Lorna E. Lockwood*	Democratic	
Maricopa	0. L. McDaniel*	Democratic	
Maricopa	T. McGowan*	Democratic	
Maricopa	Laura McRae*	Democratic	
Maricopa	W. W. Mitchell	Democratic	
Maricopa	Louise A. Moore	Democratic	
Maricopa	Frank Mosshammer	Democratic	
Maricopa	Claire Phelps	Democratic	
Maricopa	C. T. Thompson*	Democratic	
Maricopa	Kirby L. Vidrine*	Democratic	
Maricopa	Roy A. Williams	Democratic	
Mohave	E. L. Jameson*	Democratic	
Navajo	Don Udall	Democratic	
Navajo	E. P. Kiernan	Democratic	
Pima	Frank G. Robles	Democratic	
Pima	Robert H. Forbes*	Democratic	
Pima	John H. Rapp	Democratic	
Pima	Roy Martin	Democratic	
Pima	Gaynor K. Stover	Democratic	
Pima	J. N. Chapman	Democratic	
Pima	Jonathan H. Michael	Democratic	
Pinal	C. S. Goff*	Democratic	
Pinal	George Ernst	Democratic	
Santa Cruz	W. H. Hathaway	Democratic	
Yavapai	Robert E. Perkins*	Democratic	
Yavapai	Robert Crable	Democratic	
Yavapai	Leonard Klein*	Democratic	
Yavapai	Robert G. Chambers	Democratic	
Yuma	Nellie T. Bush	Democratic	
Yuma	Albert W. Dudley	Democratic	
