= James McFarland =

James or Jim McFarland may refer to:

- J. R. McFarland (James R. McFarland), American politician from Arizona
- James T. McFarland (1930–2015), American lawyer and politician from New York
- Jim McFarland (1947–2020), American politician from Nebraska
