= Allan K. Perry =

American politician

Member of the Arizona Senate from the Maricopa County district
- In office January 1929 – December 1930
- Preceded by: Dan P. Jones; Harlow Akers
- Succeeded by: Joe C. Haldiman; Frank T. Pomeroy

Personal details
- Born: 1898 Wisconsin
- Died: November 13, 1976 (aged 77–78) Phoenix, Arizona
- Party: Democratic
- Education: University of Arizona
- Profession: Politician

Allan K. Perry was an American politician from Arizona. He served a single term in the Arizona State Senate during the 9th Arizona State Legislature, holding one of the two seats from Maricopa County. Perry was born in 1898 in Wisconsin, and moved to Arizona in 1917. He graduated from the University of Arizona with a law degree and went to work with his partner, Charles Wolfe, in the firm of Wolfe and Perry in Tempe, Arizona. He moved to Phoenix and became a law partner in the firm of Kramner-Rocher-Perry in 1932. Perry married Capitola Roach on July 25, 1922, in Phoenix, Arizona. The couple had three children, Wallace, Allan R., and Yvonne. In 1951 he wrote the novel, Winners Get Lost, which was well received by critics, both when it was initially released, and again upon its re-release in 1964. His daughter, Yvonne, edited the manuscript for her father. He served as Arizona's assistant attorney general under both John Sullivan and Joe Conway. He died on November 13, 1976, at St. Joseph's Hospital in Phoenix.
