= J. Hubert Smith =

American politician from Arizona

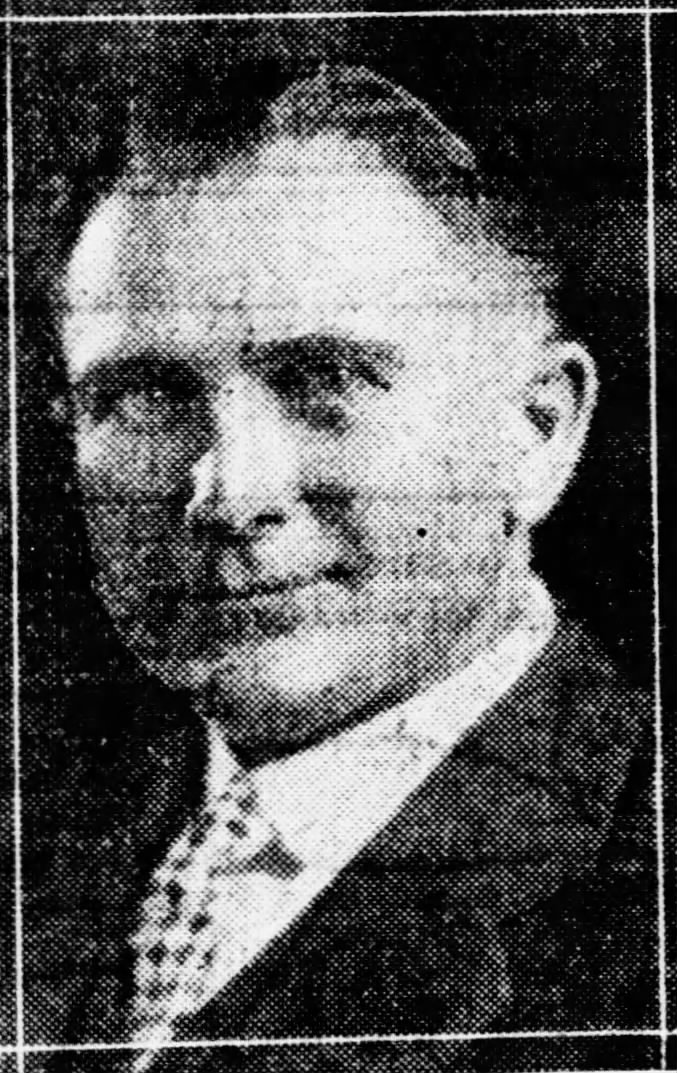
- Smith, ca. 1928

Member of the Arizona Senate from the Mohave County district
- In office January 1939 – December 1944
- Preceded by: Robert E. Morrow
- Succeeded by: Charles P. Elmer
- In office January 1935 – December 1938
- Preceded by: Kean St. Charles
- Succeeded by: Robert E. Morrow
- In office January 1931 – December 1932
- Preceded by: Kean St. Charles
- Succeeded by: Kean St. Charles

Personal details
- Born: July 21, 1887 Kingman, Arizona
- Died: February 4, 1978 (aged 90) Kingman, Arizona
- Party: Democratic
- Profession: Politician

J. Hubert Smith, also known as J. H. Smith or J. H. (Hubert) Smith was an American politician from Arizona. He served several terms in the Arizona State Senate during the 10th, 12th, 13th, 15th, and 16th Arizona State Legislatures holding the seat from Mohave County. He also served as an assistant state attorney general during the 1940s.

== Biography ==
Smith was born in Kingman, Arizona on July 21, 1887. He married his wife on December 25, 1910.

Smith was an attorney in Kingman, Arizona, associated with the firm of Louis L. Wallace. In 1926 he ran unopposed for position of Mohave County attorney. In 1928, he did not run for re-election, choosing to throw his hat in the ring for the state's attorney general position. However, he came in a distant fourth in a four-man race in the Democrat primary behind A. R. Lynch, John L. Sullivan, and the eventual winner, K. Berry Peterson.

In 1930, he was nominated by the Democrats to run for the Arizona State Senate, seeking the seat from Mohave County. He was unopposed in November's general election. Coincidently, his father, Anson Smith, was nominated to run for the lone seat in the Arizona House of Representatives from Mohave County. He also ran unopposed, so that both father and son served in the same session of the state legislature. He ran for re-election in 1932, but was defeated in the Democrat primary by Kean St. Charles, who had held the seat during the 9th Arizona State Legislature. His father was also defeated in the primary. In 1934 Smith once again faced off against St. Charles the Democrat's primary, but this time it was Smith who walked away with the victory. He was unopposed in the general election. He was re-elected in 1936, running unopposed in both the primary and general election.

He did not run for re-election in 1938. However, he did run in 1940, and faced his old rival, St. Charles, in the primary, defeating him 1,647 to 497. He won in November's general election as well. He ran for re-election in 1942, and was opposed by Frank Ricca, who he defeated in the primary by more than a 2–1 margin. He was unopposed in the general election. He did not run for re-election in 1944. Later that year, he was appointed as an assistant state attorney general by John L. Sullivan, who he had run against in the 1928 Democrat primary for State Attorney General.

Smith died on February 4, 1978, in Kingman, Arizona.
