= 13th Arizona State Legislature =

Session of the Arizona Legislature

←	12th	14th	→
- Arizona State Capitol (2014)

Overview
- Legislative body: Arizona State Legislature
- Jurisdiction: Arizona, United States
- Term: January 1, 1937 – December 31, 1938

Senate
- Members: 19
- President: Paul C. Keefe
- Party control: Democratic (19–0)

House of Representatives
- Members: 51
- Speaker: Vernon G. Davis
- Party control: Democratic (50–1)

Sessions
- 1st: January 11 – March 13, 1937

Special sessions
- 1st: May 10 – May 29, 1937
- 2nd: June 2 – June 22, 1937
- 3rd: July 22 – August 4, 1937
- 4th: September 15 – October 4, 1938

The 13th Arizona State Legislature, consisting of the Arizona State Senate and the Arizona House of Representatives, was constituted in Phoenix from January 1, 1937, to December 31, 1938, during Rawghlie Clement Stanford's first and only term as Governor of Arizona. The number of senators and representatives remained constant, with 19 and 51 members respectively. While the Democrats regained one hundred percent of the senate seats, the Republicans broke the Democrats complete domination in the house, managing to obtain a single seat, one of the two from Navajo County.

== Sessions ==
The Legislature met for the regular session at the State Capitol in Phoenix on January 11, 1937; and adjourned on March 13. There were four special sessions. The first ran from May 10 through May 29, 1937; the second ran from June 2 through June 22, 1937; the third special session was convened on July 22, 1937, and adjourned on August 4. and the fourth and final special session ran from September 15 – October 4, 1938.

== State Senate ==
=== Members ===
The asterisk (*) denotes members of the previous Legislature who continued in office as members of this Legislature.

County	Senator	Party	Notes
Apache	W. E. Wiltbank	Democratic	
Cochise	Joe S. Hunt*	Democratic	
Cochise	Dan Angius*	Democratic	
Coconino	James E. Babbitt	Democratic	
Gila	Daniel E. Rienhardt*	Democratic	
Gila	E. H. McEachren*	Democratic	
Graham	W. B. Kelly	Democratic	
Greenlee	A. C. Stanton	Democratic	
Maricopa	Frank T. Pomeroy	Democratic	
Maricopa	R. T. Jones	Democratic	
Mohave	J. Hubert Smith*	Democratic	
Navajo	Robert L. Moore	Democratic	
Pima	Henry A. Dalton	Democratic	
Pima	August Wieden	Democratic	
Pinal	W. C. Truman	Democratic	
Santa Cruz	J. A. Harrison*	Democratic	
Yavapai	Paul C. Keefe*	Democratic	President
Yavapai	W. E. Patterson*	Democratic	
Yuma	H. H. Baker	Democratic	

== House of Representatives ==
=== Members ===
The asterisk (*) denotes members of the previous Legislature who continued in office as members of this Legislature. The size of the House remained constant from the prior legislature: 51 seats.

County	Representative	Party	Notes
Apache	G. Oscar Hamblin	Democratic	
Cochise	David J. Marks*	Democratic	
Cochise	Howard McKinney	Democratic	
Cochise	M. A. Gray*	Democratic	
Cochise	Frank W. Sharpe Jr.*	Democratic	
Cochise	Vernon G. Davis*	Democratic	
Coconino	Clyde M. Stauffer*	Democratic	
Coconino	L. S. Williams*	Democratic	
Gila	James R. Heron*	Democratic	
Gila	William G. Rosenbaum*	Democratic	
Gila	Nelson D. Brayton	Democratic	
Graham	Frank Skinner	Democratic	
Graham	S. 0. Williams	Democratic	
Greenlee	Fred J. Fritz	Democratic	
Maricopa	George A. Batchelder*	Democratic	
Maricopa	J. Irvin Burk	Democratic	
Maricopa	J. M. Combs	Democratic	
Maricopa	Jack Cummard	Democratic	
Maricopa	M. E. Curry*	Democratic	
Maricopa	William F. Gillett*	Democratic	
Maricopa	J. Melvin Goodson*	Democratic	
Maricopa	Philip A. Isley*	Democratic	
Maricopa	Lindsay Johnson	Democratic	
Maricopa	L. R. McDonald	Democratic	
Maricopa	Charles M. Menderson	Democratic	
Maricopa	W. W. Mitchell	Democratic	
Maricopa	William Petersen*	Democratic	
Maricopa	Bridgie Porter*	Democratic	
Maricopa	Fritzi Struckmeyer	Democratic	
Maricopa	Harry J. Sullivan	Democratic	
Maricopa	C. T. Thompson*	Democratic	
Maricopa	R. K. Wood*	Democratic	
Mohave	Robert E. Morrow*	Democratic	
Navajo	William Bourdon	Democratic	
Navajo	Oren L. Murray*	Democratic	
Pima	Vern Priser	Democratic	
Pima	Harold D. Adamson	Democratic	
Pima	William Wisdom*	Democratic	
Pima	L. B. Wilson	Democratic	
Pima	F. K. (Kit) Carson	Democratic	
Pima	B. J. O'Neill*	Democratic	
Pima	William Spaid	Democratic	
Pinal	R. W. Kenworthy*	Democratic	
Pinal	W. E. Mullen*	Democratic	
Santa Cruz	Gordon Farley	Democratic	
Yavapai	A. A. Johns	Democratic	
Yavapai	V. A. Reichard*	Democratic	
Yavapai	Leonard Klein	Democratic	
Yavapai	Harry J. Mader*	Democratic	
Yuma	Eli C. Shelton	Democratic	
Yuma	William Wisener*	Democratic	
