= Harry W. Hill =

Harry W. Hill may refer to:

- Harry W. Hill (politician) (1886–1954), Arizona state senator
- Harry W. Hill (admiral) (1890–1971), admiral in the U. S. Navy
