= T. P. Thompson =

T. P. Thompson may refer to:

- Thomas Perronet Thompson (1783–1869), British Parliamentarian, governor of Sierra Leone
- T. P. Thompson (Arizona politician), Arizona state senator
