= Senator Young =

Senator Young may refer to:

== United States Senate ==
- Lafayette Young (1848–1926), U.S. Senator from Iowa from 1910 to 1911
- Milton Young (1897–1983), U.S. Senator from North Dakota from 1945 to 1981
- Richard M. Young (1798–1861), U.S. Senator from Illinois from 1837 to 1843
- Stephen M. Young (1889–1984), U.S. Senator from Ohio from 1959 until 1971
- Todd Young (born 1972), U.S. Senator from Indiana since 2017

== United States state senate members ==
=== Alaska State Senate ===
- Don Young (1933–2022)

=== Arizona State Senate ===
- J. Warren Young (1868–1933)

=== California State Senate ===
- Sanborn Young (1873–1964)

=== Florida State Senate ===
- Anthony W. Young (1866–1948)
- Bill Young (Florida politician) (1930–2013)
- Dana Young (born 1964)

=== Indiana State Senate ===
- R. Michael Young (born 1951)
- Richard D. Young (1942–2025

=== Iowa State Senate ===
- James Addison Young (1815–1875)

=== Kansas State Senate ===
- Isaac D. Young (1849–1927)

=== Maryland State Senate ===
- Karen Lewis Young (born 1951)
- Larry Young (politician) (born 1949)
- Ronald N. Young (born 1940)

=== Michigan State Senate ===
- Coleman Young (1918–1997)
- Coleman Young II (born 1982)
- Robert D. Young (politician) (1934–2013)

=== Minnesota State Senate ===
- Edward T. Young (1858–1940)

=== Missouri State Senate ===
- James Young (Missouri politician) (1800–1878)

=== Nevada State Senate ===
- Clarence Clifton Young (1922–2016)

=== New Jersey State Senate ===
- David Young III (1905–1977)

=== New York State Senate ===
- Catharine Young (politician) (born 1960)
- Fred A. Young (1904–1973)
- Horace C. Young (1806–1879)
- Samuel Young (New York politician) (1779–1850)

=== North Dakota State Senate ===
- George M. Young (1870–1932)

=== Ohio State Senate ===
- Thomas L. Young (1832–1888)

=== Oklahoma State Senate ===
- George E. Young (fl. 2010s–2020s)

=== South Carolina State Senate ===
- Tom Young Jr. (born 1971)

=== Wisconsin State Senate ===
- Austin H. Young (1830–1905)
- Cornelius T. Young (1907–1980)
- Milas K. Young (1812–1875)
- William Young (Wisconsin politician) (1821–1890)
- Van Eps Young (1822–1895)
