= Senator MacFarlane =

Senator MacFarlane may refer to:

- Granger Macfarlane (1929–2025), Virginia State Senate
- J.D. MacFarlane (1933–2023), Colorado State Senate

== See also ==
- Senator McFarlane (disambiguation)
