= Senator Crenshaw =

Senator Crenshaw may refer to:

- Ander Crenshaw (born 1944), Florida State Senate
- C. C. Crenshaw (1883–1940), Arizona State Senate
