= Harlow Akers =

American politician from Arizona

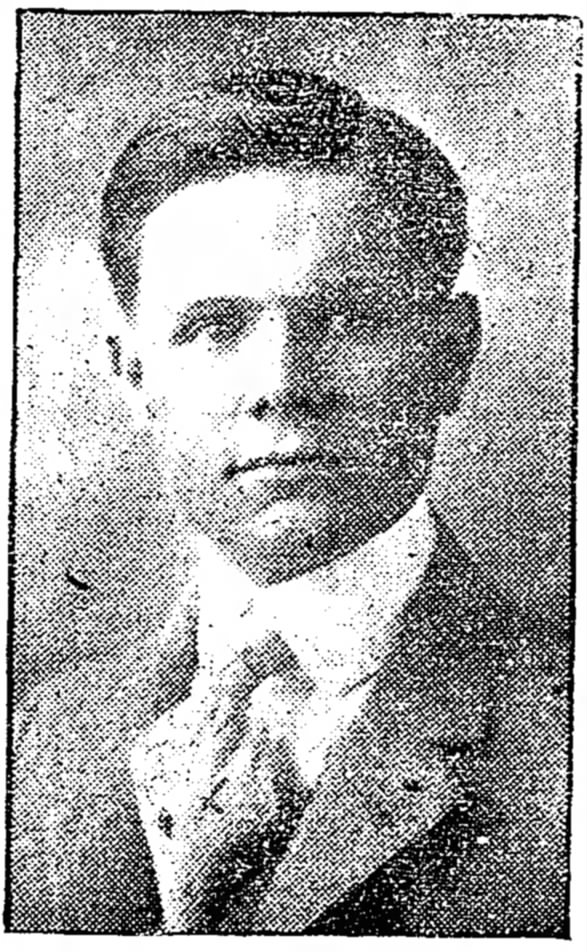
- Akers, ca. 1917

Member of the Arizona Senate from the Maricopa County district
- In office January 1927 – December 1928
- Preceded by: J. J. Cox; H. A. Davis
- Succeeded by: Allan K. Perry; J. G. Peterson

Personal details
- Born: October 28, 1898 Phoenix, Arizona
- Died: December 1, 1945 (aged 47) Phoenix
- Party: Democratic
- Profession: Politician

Harlow Akers (October 28, 1898 - December 1, 1945) was an American politician from Arizona. He served a single term in the Arizona State Senate during the 8th Arizona State Legislature, holding one of the two seats from Maricopa County. In 1932, he ran for the Democrat nomination for the U. S. Senate, but lost to incumbent Carl Hayden.

== Biography ==
Akers was born on October 28, 1898, in Phoenix, Arizona, son of Arizona pioneers Charles A. and Jennie Bryan Akers. Akers attended Phoenix Union High School, and after graduating, he joined the U.S. Navy, and served throughout World War I. After receiving his discharge from the Navy, he went on to receive his B.A. and LL.D. at the University of Michigan, graduating in 1924. While at university, he was a member of Delta Chi. When he graduated from law school in 1924, he intended to become a lawyer. However, his father, owner of the Arizona Gazette, died that year, and Akers returned to Phoenix to help run the paper. He married Pearl Addams on January 25, 1925, in Trinity Cathedral in Phoenix. The couple had one son, Charles Harlow.

In 1926, Akers ran for one of the two Arizona State Senate seats from Maricopa County. Of the eight candidates in the Democrat primary, Akers obtained the most votes in the primary. In the November general election, Akers and fellow Democrat Dan P. Jones, won. In 1932, Akers ran in the primary for the Democrat nomination for the U. S. Senate. There were four candidates in the race and Akers finished second behind incumbent Carl Hayden, 38,705 to 30,632. The other two candidates finished a distant third and fourth place. Akers died on December 1, 1945, in Phoenix, after a six-week illness.
