= Senator Farmer =

Senator Farmer may refer to:

- Gary Farmer (Florida politician) (born 1964), Florida State Senate
- Hugo Farmer (1878–1957), Arizona State Senate
- John Q. Farmer (1823–1904), Minnesota State Senate
- William M. Farmer (1853–1931), Illinois State Senate
