= 16th Arizona State Legislature =

Session of the Arizona Legislature

←	15th	17th	→
- Arizona State Capitol (2014)

Overview
- Legislative body: Arizona State Legislature
- Jurisdiction: Arizona, United States
- Term: January 1, 1943 – December 31, 1944

Senate
- Members: 19
- Party control: Democratic (19–0)

House of Representatives
- Members: 58
- Party control: Democratic (58–0)

Sessions
- 1st: January 11 – March 14, 1943

Special sessions
- 1st: February 15 – February 24, 1944
- 2nd: February 25 – March 16, 1944

The 16th Arizona State Legislature, consisting of the Arizona State Senate and the Arizona House of Representatives, was constituted in Phoenix from January 1, 1943, to December 31, 1944, during the second of Sidney Preston Osborn's four consecutive terms as Governor of Arizona. The number of senators remained constant at 19, while the house increased from 52 to 58 members. The Democrats controlled all the senate and house seats.

== Sessions ==
The Legislature met for the regular session at the State Capitol in Phoenix on January 11, 1943; and adjourned on March 14. There were two special sessions, the first of which was held from February 15 through February 24, 1944, and the second of which was held from February 25 – March 16, 1944.

== State Senate ==
=== Members ===
The asterisk (*) denotes members of the previous Legislature who continued in office as members of this Legislature.

County	Senator	Party	Notes
Apache	Bert J. Colter*	Democratic	
Cochise	Ralph Cowan*	Democratic	
Cochise	Dan Angius*	Democratic	
Coconino	James E. Babbitt*	Democratic	
Gila	S. L. Bixby*	Democratic	
Gila	James R. Heron	Democratic	
Graham	V. P. Richards	Democratic	
Greenlee	A. C. Stanton*	Democratic	
Maricopa	James Minotto	Democratic	
Maricopa	Walter J. Thalheimer	Democratic	
Mohave	J. Hubert Smith*	Democratic	
Navajo	Lloyd C. Henning*	Democratic	
Pima	H. H. d'Autremont*	Democratic	
Pima	William Kimball*	Democratic	
Pinal	L. E. Canfil	Democratic	
Santa Cruz	W. H. Hathaway	Democratic	
Yavapai	Paul C. Keefe*	Democratic	
Yavapai	Norman Fain*	Democratic	
Yuma	H. H. Baker*	Democratic	

== House of Representatives ==
=== Members ===
The asterisk (*) denotes members of the previous Legislature who continued in office as members of this Legislature. The size of the House increased to 58 members; 4 seats were added in Maricopa County and 2 in Pima County.

County	Representative	Party	Notes
Apache	Walter Pulsipher*	Democratic	
Cochise	William K. Caley	Democratic	
Cochise	Howard McKinney*	Democratic	
Cochise	H. J. Lewis*	Democratic	
Cochise	Frank W. Sharpe Jr.*	Democratic	
Cochise	A. R. Spikes	Democratic	
Coconino	Frank L. Christensen*	Democratic	
Coconino	W. C. Rittenhouse	Democratic	
Gila	Robert Fitzgerald	Democratic	
Gila	William G. Rosenbaum*	Democratic	
Gila	Harold Copp*	Democratic	
Graham	Walter Foote	Democratic	
Graham	Warner B. Mattice*	Democratic	
Greenlee	Fred J. Fritz*	Democratic	
Maricopa	Charles H. Abels	Democratic	
Maricopa	H. C. Armstrong*	Democratic	
Maricopa	G. N. Baker	Democratic	
Maricopa	Arthur J. Barnes	Democratic	
Maricopa	Cecil A. Bell*	Democratic	
Maricopa	Maxine P. Brubaker*	Democratic	
Maricopa	William H. Chester	Democratic	
Maricopa	Jack Cummard	Democratic	
Maricopa	J. H. Fairbanks	Democratic	
Maricopa	Carroll Hudson	Democratic	
Maricopa	Fred M. Jahn	Democratic	
Maricopa	Frank E. Jordan	Democratic	
Maricopa	R. F. Kilpatrick*	Democratic	
Maricopa	Alvin Lindsey	Democratic	
Maricopa	O. L. McDaniel*	Democratic	
Maricopa	D. McDonald	Democratic	
Maricopa	T. McGowan*	Democratic	
Maricopa	Laura McRae	Democratic	
Maricopa	W. W. Mitchell*	Democratic	
Maricopa	S. Norton	Democratic	
Maricopa	Claire Phelps*	Democratic	
Maricopa	Kenneth K. Pound	Democratic	
Maricopa	Joe M. Rumsey	Democratic	
Mohave	E. L. Jameson*	Democratic	
Navajo	John L. Westover	Democratic	
Navajo	W. T. Willey	Democratic	
Pima	Frank G. Robles*	Democratic	
Pima	Robert H. Forbes*	Democratic	
Pima	Joseph J. O'Neill	Democratic	
Pima	Roy Martin*	Democratic	
Pima	Gaynor K. Stover*	Democratic	
Pima	John H. Ayraud	Democratic	
Pima	Jerome P. Martin	Democratic	
Pima	D. M. Penny	Democratic	
Pima	A. Berky	Democratic	
Pinal	C. S. Goff*	Democratic	
Pinal	George Ernst*	Democratic	
Santa Cruz	Richard S. Stearns Jr.	Democratic	
Yavapai	Robert E. Perkins*	Democratic	
Yavapai	A. L. Favour	Democratic	
Yavapai	Leonard Klein*	Democratic	
Yavapai	Harry E. Metz	Democratic	
Yuma	Clara Osborne Botzum	Democratic	
Yuma	Albert W. Dudley*	Democratic	
