= Attorney General Conway =

Attorney General Conway may refer to:

- D. Walter Conway (1898–1956), Attorney General of South Dakota
- George C. Conway (1900–1969), Attorney General of Connecticut
- Jack Conway (politician) (born 1969), Attorney General of Kentucky
- Joe Conway (Arizona lawyer) (1898–1945), Attorney General of Arizona

== See also ==
- General Conway (disambiguation)
