= E. I. Whiting =

American politician from Arizona

Member of the Arizona Senate from the Yavapai County district
- In office January 1919 – December 1920
- Preceded by: Fred Colter
- Succeeded by: W. A. Saunders
- In office January 1929 – December 1930
- Preceded by: Fred Colter
- Succeeded by: T. J. Bouldin

Personal details
- Born: 1883 Brigham City, Arizona
- Died: January 4, 1963 (aged 79–80) St Johns, Arizona
- Party: Republican
- Spouse: Ethel Farr
- Children: Edwin Farr, Lee, Virgil, Merwin, Mabel, Melba, and Erma
- Profession: Politician, businessman

Edwin Isaacson Whiting was an American politician and businessman from Arizona. He served two terms in the Arizona State Senate in the 4th and 9th Arizona State Legislatures. With his three brothers and father, he was one of the founders of Whiting Brothers and Kaibab Industries.

== Biography ==
Whiting was born in Brigham City, Arizona, in 1883. He was the son of Edwin M. Whiting, who founded the enterprise which would become Whiting Brothers in the 1920s, and Mary E. Upham. In 1890 the family moved to Mapleton, Utah, where the senior Whiting opened a lumber mill. The family returned to Arizona in 1901, when they relocated to St. Johns. The elder Whiting built and opened a general store.

In 1906 Whiting traveled to Salt Lake City, where he married Ethel Farr. After the wedding the two returned to St. Johns. The couple had seven children, four sons and three daughters. Their firstborn son was Edwin Farr, born in 1907. Their second son, Lee, was born in 1909, but died in infancy. Virgil was born in 1916, and their final son Merwin in 1924. Merwin died in 1939 as the result of a tractor accident, and Edwin and Virgil died in a private plane crash in 1961. Their three daughters were Mabel, Melba, and Erma. After returning to St. Johns, Whiting took up farming. By 1912 he was in charge of the family's store in St. Johns. That same year the family opened their first sawmill in Arizona, near Green's Peak.

By 1914, the holdings of the family were under the mantle of The Whiting Brothers, having been formed by the four brothers, E. I., Ernest, Arthur, and Ralph, and their father. In November 1918 Whiting was elected to the Arizona State Senate, becoming the senator from Apache County in the 4th Arizona State Legislature. In November 1919 he was one of the founding members, and first president, of the St. Johns Chamber of Commerce. Whiting decided not to run for re-election to the State Senate in 1920. In 1922 he was made the bishop of the St. Johns Ward of the Latter Day Saint movement. He was the seventh bishop of the ward. Also in 1922 he was elected to the Apache County Board of Supervisors. In 1926 he was selected by the Republicans to once again run for the State Senate, however he lost to the incumbent, Fred Colter, in the November general election. In 1928, Whiting and Colter met in a rematch for the State Senate seat, this time with Whiting coming out on top. In 1930 Whiting ran for re-election, one of nine state senators doing so. He was the only incumbent to lose in the November general election.

In 1942 a gas truck filled with butane exploded at Whiting's garage in St. Johns, killing two people. The subsequent fire burned down an entire city block, most of the buildings on that block were owned by Whiting. In 1960 he was elected to be one of Arizona's four presidential electors. In 1952, along with his three brothers founded the Kaibab Lumber Company. Whiting died on January 4, 1963, at his home in St. Johns.
