= 9th Arizona State Legislature =

Session of the Arizona Legislature

←	8th	10th	→
- Arizona State Capitol (2014)

Overview
- Legislative body: Arizona State Legislature
- Jurisdiction: Arizona, United States
- Term: January 1, 1929 – December 31, 1930

Senate
- Members: 19
- President: H. W. Hill (D)
- Party control: Democratic (17–2)

House of Representatives
- Members: 54
- Speaker: M. J. Hannon (D)
- Party control: Democratic (37–17)

Sessions
- 1st: January 14 – March 14, 1929

The 9th Arizona State Legislature, consisting of the Arizona State Senate and the Arizona House of Representatives, was constituted from January 1, 1929, to December 31, 1930, during the first and second years of John Calhoun Phillips's tenure as Governor of Arizona, in Phoenix. The number of senators remained constant at 19, while the number of representatives increased from 52 to 54. The Democrats held large majorities in both houses, although the Republicans made significant inroads in the House.

== Sessions ==
The Legislature met for the regular session at the State Capitol in Phoenix on January 14, 1929; and adjourned on March 14.

There were no special sessions of this legislature during 1929 and 1930.

== State Senate ==
=== Members ===
The asterisk (*) denotes members of the previous Legislature who continued in office as members of this Legislature.

County	Senator	Party	Notes
Apache	E. I. Whiting	Republican	
Cochise	Fred Sutter*	Democratic	
Cochise	John Wilson Ross	Democratic	
Coconino	Earl C. Slipher	Democratic	
Gila	Alfred Kinney*	Democratic	
Gila	John R. Lyons*	Democratic	Lyons died September 27, 1929
Gila	E. H. McEachren	Democratic	Appointed to replace Lyons November 6, 1929
Graham	Thomas S. Kimball*	Democratic	
Greenlee	Harry W. Hill*	Democratic	
Maricopa	Allan K. Perry	Democratic	
Maricopa	J. G. Peterson	Democratic	
Mohave	Kean St. Charles	Democratic	
Navajo	G. W. Nelson*	Democratic	
Pima	T. W. Donnelly*	Democratic	
Pima	Merton Martensen	Republican	
Pinal	George Truman	Democratic	
Santa Cruz	Andrew Bettwy*	Democratic	
Yavapai	A. H. Favour*	Democratic	
Yavapai	J. R. McFarland	Democratic	
Yuma	Hugo Farmer	Democratic	

=== Employees ===
The following held unelected positions within the Legislature:

- Secretary: William J. Graham
- Assistant Secretary: Bridgie Porter
- Sergeant-at-Arms: Ralph Hooker
- Chaplain: Dan P. Jones
- Doorkeeper: John S. Merrill

== House of Representatives ==
=== Members ===
The asterisk (*) denotes members of the previous Legislature who continued in office as members of this Legislature. The House grew by five seats from the 8th Legislature: 1 each in Coconino and Maricopa counties.

County	Representative	Party	Notes
Apache	John R. Coleman	Democratic	
Cochise	W. E. Oxsheer*	Democratic	
Cochise	A. J. Morgan*	Democratic	
Cochise	Thomas Cowperthwaite*	Democratic	
Cochise	James H. Barrett	Republican	
Cochise	A. E. Hinton	Democratic	
Cochise	R. B. Vallance	Republican	
Cochise	William Coxon*	Democratic	
Coconino	Fred W. Perkins*	Republican	Deceased - replaced by Howard Marine
Coconino	Howard Marine	Republican	Replace Fred W. Perkins
Coconino	E. T. McGonigle	Democratic	
Gila	John McCormick*	Democratic	
Gila	J. T. Lewis	Democratic	
Gila	William G. Rosenbaum*	Democratic	
Gila	Roy F. Kelly	Democratic	
Graham	W. L. Nelson*	Republican	
Graham	S. O. Williams*	Democratic	
Greenlee	M. J. Hannon*	Democratic	
Greenlee	W. T. Witt	Democratic	
Maricopa	J. R. Barnette	Democratic	
Maricopa	Ione Breinholt	Republican	
Maricopa	C. M. Brimhall	Democratic	
Maricopa	William D. Christy	Republican	
Maricopa	J. M. Combs	Democratic	
Maricopa	M. V. Decker*	Democratic	
Maricopa	H. A. Diehl	Republican	
Maricopa	M. J. Francis*	Democratic	
Maricopa	W. G. Henderson	Democratic	
Maricopa	Vernetie O. Ivy*	Democratic	
Maricopa	J. F. Jennings	Democratic	
Maricopa	Orme Lewis	Republican	
Maricopa	J. Lee Loveless	Democratic	
Maricopa	Sidney B. Moeur	Democratic	
Maricopa	M. Alice Patterson	Democratic	
Maricopa	F. Heber Taylor	Republican	
Maricopa	D. R. Van Petten	Republican	
Mohave	A. H. Smith	Democratic	
Navajo	J. J. Shumway	Democratic	
Navajo	C. G. McQuillan*	Republican	
Pima	C. T. Reddington	Democratic	
Pima	F. E. A. Kimball*	Republican	
Pima	Thomas Malony	Democratic	
Pima	Neil H. Harring	Republican	
Pima	H. R. Stewart	Republican	
Pima	Oliver B. Patton*	Democratic	
Pinal	S. P. Morgan	Democratic	
Pinal	Thomas S. Richards	Democratic	
Santa Cruz	J. F. Pomeroy	Republican	
Yavapai	Annie C. Jones	Democratic	
Yavapai	Byron Partridge	Democratic	
Yavapai	Alfred B. Carr	Democratic	
Yavapai	R. L. Finch	Republican	
Yavapai	W. L. Benham	Republican	
Yuma	Virginia Harris	Democratic	
Yuma	William Wisener*	Democratic	

=== Employees ===
The following held unelected positions within the Legislature:

- Chief Clerk: Lallah Ruth
- Assistant Chief Clerk: Ruby Coulter
- Sergeant-at-Arms: O.J. Whitesides
- Chaplain: Reverend C. M. Burkhart
