= 14th Arizona State Legislature =

Session of the Arizona Legislature

←	13th	15th	→
- Arizona State Capitol (2014)

Overview
- Legislative body: Arizona State Legislature
- Jurisdiction: Arizona, United States
- Term: January 1, 1939 – December 31, 1940

Senate
- Members: 19
- Party control: Democratic (19–0)

House of Representatives
- Members: 52
- Party control: Democratic (51–1)

Sessions
- 1st: January 9 – March 13, 1939

Special sessions
- 1st: September 23 – September 27, 1940

The 14th Arizona State Legislature, consisting of the Arizona State Senate and the Arizona House of Representatives, was constituted in Phoenix from January 1, 1939, to December 31, 1940, during Robert Taylor Jones's first and only term as Governor of Arizona. The number of senators remained constant at 19, while the House increased from 51 to 52 members. The Democrats maintained one hundred percent of the senate seats, while the Republicans continued to have a single seat in the House, one of the two from Navajo County.

== Sessions ==
The Legislature met for the regular session at the State Capitol in Phoenix on January 9, 1939; and adjourned on March 13. There was a special session which was held from September 23–27, 1940.

== State Senate ==
=== Members ===
The asterisk (*) denotes members of the previous Legislature who continued in office as members of this Legislature.

County	Senator	Party	Notes
Apache	John R. Coleman	Democratic	
Cochise	H. A. (Pete) Wimberly*	Democratic	
Cochise	Dan Angius*	Democratic	
Coconino	James E. Babbitt*	Democratic	
Gila	Daniel E. Rienhardt*	Democratic	
Gila	A. R. Edwards	Democratic	
Graham	Benjamin Blake	Democratic	
Greenlee	A. C. Stanton*	Democratic	
Maricopa	James Minotto	Democratic	
Maricopa	Charles M. Menderson	Democratic	
Mohave	Robert E. Morrow	Democratic	
Navajo	Robert L. Moore*	Democratic	
Pima	Henry A. Dalton*	Democratic	
Pima	V. Clare Dodd	Democratic	
Pinal	William Coxon	Democratic	
Santa Cruz	Harold C. Roesner	Democratic	resigned January 31, 1939
Santa Cruz	E. F. Bohlinger	Democratic	appointed to replace Roesner, February 1, 1939
Yavapai	Paul C. Keefe*	Democratic	
Yavapai	W. E. Patterson*	Democratic	
Yuma	H. H. Baker*	Democratic	

== House of Representatives ==
=== Members ===
The asterisk (*) denotes members of the previous Legislature who continued in office as members of this Legislature. The size of the House increased by a single seat to 52 members, when Maricopa was given a 19th seat.

County	Representative	Party	Notes
Apache	G. Oscar Hamblin*	Democratic	
Cochise	Ralph Cowan	Democratic	
Cochise	Howard McKinney*	Democratic	
Cochise	M. A. Gray*	Democratic	
Cochise	Frank W. Sharpe Jr.*	Democratic	
Cochise	E. B. McAleb	Democratic	
Coconino	Clyde M. Stauffer*	Democratic	
Coconino	Charles F. Wade	Democratic	
Gila	James R. Heron*	Democratic	
Gila	William G. Rosenbaum*	Democratic	
Gila	Harold Copp	Democratic	
Graham	J. W. Greenhalgh	Democratic	
Graham	Warner B. Mattice	Democratic	
Greenlee	Fred J. Fritz*	Democratic	
Maricopa	George A. Batchelder*	Democratic	
Maricopa	Cecil A. Bell	Democratic	
Maricopa	Jack Cummard*	Democratic	
Maricopa	M. E. Curry*	Democratic	
Maricopa	Charles T. Francis	Democratic	
Maricopa	J. Melvin Goodson*	Democratic	
Maricopa	Raymond S. Hill	Democratic	
Maricopa	Lorna E. Lockwood	Democratic	
Maricopa	0. L. McDaniel	Democratic	
Maricopa	T. McGowan	Democratic	
Maricopa	Laura McRae	Democratic	
Maricopa	W. R. Palmer	Democratic	
Maricopa	Walter J. Righetti	Democratic	
Maricopa	Marvin E. Smith	Democratic	
Maricopa	William E. Stanford	Democratic	
Maricopa	C. T. Thompson*	Democratic	
Maricopa	Raymond Wiggins	Democratic	
Maricopa	Kirby L. Vidrine	Democratic	
Maricopa	R. K. Wood*	Democratic	
Mohave	E. L. Jameson	Democratic	
Navajo	William Bourdon*	Democratic	
Navajo	Oren L. Murray*	Democratic	
Pima	C. J. (Jimmy) Carreon	Democratic	
Pima	Robert H. Forbes	Democratic	
Pima	D. M. Penny	Democratic	
Pima	L. B. Wilson *	Democratic	
Pima	F. K. (Kit) Carson*	Democratic	
Pima	B. J. O'Neill*	Democratic	
Pima	William Spaid*	Democratic	
Pinal	C. S. Goff	Democratic	
Pinal	W. E. Mullen*	Democratic	
Santa Cruz	George F. MacDonald	Democratic	
Yavapai	Robert E. Perkins	Democratic	
Yavapai	V. A. Reichard*	Democratic	
Yavapai	Leonard Klein*	Democratic	
Yavapai	Harry J. Mader*	Democratic	
Yuma	Ed V. Shaw	Democratic	
Yuma	William Wisener*	Democratic	
