= Robert L. Moore (Arizona politician) =

American politician from Arizona

Member of the Arizona Senate from the Navajo County district
- In office January 1923 – December 1926
- Preceded by: James Scott
- Succeeded by: G. W. Nelson

Personal details
- Party: Democratic
- Spouse: Minnie
- Children: Robert
- Profession: Politician

Robert Lee Moore was an American politician from Arizona. He served four terms in the Arizona State Senate, the first during the 6th and 7th Arizona State Legislatures, holding the seat from Navajo County, and then again during the 13th and 14th Arizona State Legislatures. He was long-time engineer on the Santa Fe Railway.

== Biography ==
Moore was from Central City, Kentucky, before moving to Winslow, Arizona in approximately 1900. He was married to Minnie Moore, and they had one son, Robert. Moore was an engineer on the Santa Fe Railroad for 39 years, working the Winslow, Arizona to Gallup, New Mexico run, retiring in April 1940.

In 1922, Moore ran for the Arizona State Senate seat from Navajo County. He defeated E. A. Sawyer in the Democrat's primary, by a more than 2–1 margin, and then easily defeated the incumbent Republican James Scott in the general election. He ran for and won re-election in 1924. He ran election again in 1928, against incumbent G. W. Nelson, but lost in the Democrat primary. In 1936, he once again ran for the State Senate. He was unopposed in the Democrat primary, and easily defeated his Republican opponent, A. R. Kliendienst, in the general election. He was re-elected in 1938. He spent the last year of his life at the Santa Fe Railroad Hospital in Los Angeles, California where he died on June 22, 1942.
