= James Scott (American politician) =

American politician from Arizona

Member of the Arizona Senate from the Navajo County district
- In office January 1921 – December 1922
- Preceded by: W. A. Parr
- Succeeded by: Robert L. Moore

Personal details
- Party: Republican
- Profession: Politician

James Scott was an American politician from Arizona. He served a single term in the Arizona State Senate during the 5th Arizona State Legislature, holding the seat from Navajo County. He was one of the largest sheep ranchers in Arizona, at one point serving on the state's Sheep Sanitary Board. He was elected as one of the two delegates from Navajo County to the Arizona Constitutional Convention in 1910. At other points he was the sheriff of Apache County and the treasurer of Navajo County.

== Biography ==
Scott was born in Eugene, Oregon in 1859, and moved to Arizona in 1880. By 1885 he and his brother, Robert Scott, were living near Show Low, Arizona, where they had a large sheep ranch. Robert was also in the Arizona Legislature, the 24th Arizona Territorial Legislature, serving in the upper house as a senator from Navajo County. Scott's sheep ranch was located near Pinedale, and named "Los Pintos Rancho.

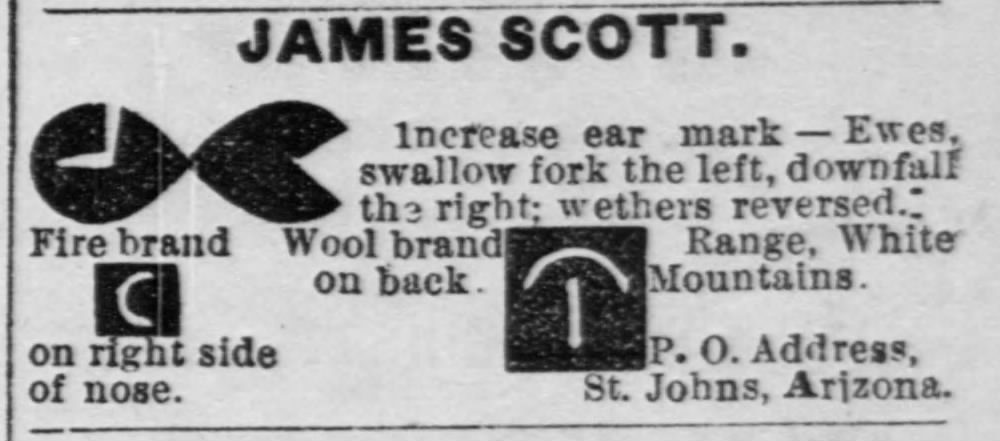
Sheep brand of James Scott

In 1886, Scott ran for one of the two seats from Apache County in the Arizona House of Representatives, which was called the "Assembly" when Arizona was a territory. He won, going to the 14th Arizona Territorial Legislature. In 1894, Scott ran to become sheriff of Apache County and won. He was married to Linda Scott. They had two daughters, Maud and May, and one son, Jimmy. In 1896, his wife, Linda, was deputized by Scott so that she could accompany a female prisoner from St. Johns, Arizona to Phoenix. In 1896, after Navajo County had been split from Apache County, Scott ran for treasurer of the new county. No longer residing in Apache County, Scott resigned as Apache County Sheriff in October 1896. In the treasurer race, Scott narrowly defeated his Democrat opponent J. H. Breed, 255–232. In 1897, Scott was appointed to serve as a tax collector in addition to his treasurer duties. Scott was re-elected as Treasurer in 1897, and remained in that position through 1899. At the end of summer 1898, Mrs. Scott and the three children moved from Arizona to Los Angeles, California, to take advantage of better school options. Scott remained in Arizona to look after his business interests, and would travel to visit the family. Scott's only son, Jimmy, died of Diphtheria in December 1899, after coming down with the disease on Thanksgiving.

When the Arizona Wool Growers Association was incorporated in 1899, Scott was on the board of the directors, as well as being president of its eastern division. In 1904, Scott was elected secretary of the Wool Grower's Association. In 1907, Governor Kibbey appointed Scott to the state's sheep sanitary board. In June 1908, Scott was stricken with appendicitis, which made him seriously ill. In October 1908, Scott was selected by the Republicans to run for the Navajo County Board of Supervisors. In a very close election in November, the two Republicans, Scott and O. B. Sutton, narrowly defeated their two Democrat opponents. Scott finished in second, only 2 votes ahead of his nearest opponent. In 1909, Scott was elected to the chairmanship of the state Sheep Sanitary Board. He served until he was replaced in 1912, when Governor Hunt named three new members.

In 1910, Scott was one of two candidates nominated by the Republicans as the representatives from Navajo County to the state's Constitutional Convention. He finished second in the October election, behind Democrat William Morgan, making them the two Navajo County representatives to the convention. In 1916, Scott's home on his ranch near Pinedale burned to the ground, along with most of its contents. In 1917 Scott was once again appointed to the state's Sheep Sanitary Board, this time by Governor Campbell. However, this time Scott declined to serve on the board. In August 1917, Scott was granted a divorce from Linda. He had attempted to get divorced several months earlier, but Linda contested the action, due to disliking the distribution of assets. This time she did not object. A year later he married Mrs. Marguerite Purcell of Holbrook. In addition to his ranch near Pinedale, Scott also kept a home in Mesa, where he spent the winters. In 1920, Scott was nominated by the Republicans to run for the sole Arizona State Senate seat from Navajo County. He won in November's general election. He ran for re-election in 1922, and was unopposed in the Republican primary. However, he was defeated by Democrat Robert L. Moore in the general election.

Scott died at this home in Mesa on February 4, 1927. In May 1927, a bronze tablet commemorating Scott, was installed on the second floor of the state capitol in Phoenix, joining six others already there of deceased members of the Constitutional Convention.
