= W. W. Midgley =

American politician from Arizona

Member of the Arizona Senate from the Coconino County district
- In office January 1931 – December 1932
- Preceded by: Earl C. Slipher
- Succeeded by: Earl C. Slipher

Personal details
- Born: March 17, 1872 Excelsior, Minnesota
- Died: December 6, 1949 (aged 77) Flagstaff, Arizona
- Party: Republican
- Spouse: Lulu May
- Profession: Politician

William W. Midgley (1872-1949) was an American politician from Arizona. He served a single term in the Arizona State Senate during the 10th Arizona State Legislature, holding the seat from Coconino County. A rancher and merchant, Midgley also ran for the Republican nomination for the governorship of Arizona.

== Biography ==
Midgley was born on March 17, 1872, in Excelsior, Minnesota. His family moved first to Alabama, and then on to California, where they settled in San Diego. Later, he opened a clothing store in Pomona, and owned large citrus fields nearby. He was known as "The Grand Old Man of the North". His social interests included the Masons, the Elks, and the Knights of Pythias.

In the 1890s he was in the U. S. Army as an enlisted man. He married Lula May Midgely on January 12, 1898. By the time of the San Francisco earthquake, Midgley was a lieutenant colonel in the California National Guard, and was given command of a regiment to assist in maintaining order and cleaning up the city. In 1912, Midgley moved to Arizona, purchasing a cattle ranch near Prescott, in the Williamson Valley. He later purchased a ranch further south, near Schnebly Hill. Midgley was one of the founders of the Arizona Good Roads Association, and served twice as its president. He was heavily involved in the movement to improve the quality of the roads in Arizona, becoming involved in the movement as soon as his arrival in the state. Midgley Bridge in Oak Creek Canyon is named in his honor. Later in life, he sold his cattle operations and began a small chain of grocery stores in Clarkdale, Winslow, Flagstaff, and Ash Fork. Midgley was a tireless campaigner for Arizona's best interests in the use of the water from the Colorado River, even after he retired in the 1940s from his grocery business. Just two weeks before his death, he was advocating vociferously for Arizona's rights to Colorado River water.

In 1918, he was elected to the Yavapai County Board of Supervisors. In 1930 Midgley ran for the Arizona State Senate seat from Coconino County. He won, and became the only Republican in the upper house of the Arizona state legislature. In 1932, Midgley decided not to run for re-election to the State Senate; instead he sought the Republican nomination for Governor. He ran against two other individuals, Jack C. Kinney and William Walton. Kinney easily defeated Midgley in the primary, 12,072 to 5,773. Midgley died on December 6, 1949, at his home in Flagstaff.
