= George A. Batchelder =

American politician (1907–1975)

George A. Batchelder (July 24, 1907 – February 21, 1975) was an American pharmacist and politician

George A. Batchelder was born in Framingham, Massachusetts, on July 24, 1907. The family moved to Phoenix, Arizona, where his father, George P. ran a pharmacy. The younger Batchelder trained as a pharmacist at a school in Los Angeles, and alongside his father, who retired in 1942. George A. Batchelder operated the Indian School Pharmacy, also in Phoenix, from 1924 to 1974. He married Joyce A. Davis in 1934, with whom he had one daughter. Batchelder was a member of the Arizona House of Representatives from Maricopa County between 1935 and 1941. He sat in the 12th, 13th, and 14th Arizona State Legislatures as a Democrat. Batchelder died in a Phoenix nursing home on February 21, 1975, and was buried at St. Francis Catholic Cemetery.
