= J. G. Peterson =

American politician from Arizona

Member of the Arizona Senate from the Maricopa County district
- In office January 1929 – December 1930
- Preceded by: Dan P. Jones; Harlow Akers
- Succeeded by: Joe C. Haldiman; Frank T. Pomeroy

Personal details
- Born: September 6, 1868 Peterson, Utah
- Died: February 5, 1955 (aged 86) Mesa, Arizona
- Party: Democratic
- Spouse: Leah Elizabeth Metz
- Profession: Politician

Jedidiah Grant Peterson was an American politician from Arizona. He served a single term in the Arizona State Senate during the 9th Arizona State Legislature, holding one of the two seats from Maricopa County. He served several terms as the Mayor of Mesa, Arizona. He also held positions on the Arizona Highway Commission and the National Irrigation Congress, as well as being instrumental in the creation of the Roosevelt Dam.

== Biography ==
Peterson was born on September 6, 1868, in Peterson, Utah, to Charles and Ann Peterson. He married Leah Elizabeth Metz in 1889. He was a member of the Woodsmen of the World, Knights of Pythias, and the Odd Fellows.

Peterson was one of Arizona's delegates to the original National Irrigation Congress in 1891. He was mayor of Mesa, Arizona from 1900 to 1902. He was on the Roosevelt Dam Commission from 1901 to 1903, and played a principle role in getting the Roosevelt Dam constructed. From 1919 through 1923, he was a member of the Arizona Highway Commission, and was responsible for helping to build 400 miles of highway in the state. He served again as mayor of Mesa, for six consecutive terms from 1924 to 1936. From 1931 to 1946 he was employed as a livestock and land appraiser for the Salt River Valley Water Users' Association and the Arizona Farmers Credit Association. Peterson died on February 5, 1955, in Mesa Southside Hospital in Mesa, after a long illness.
