= Ray Ferguson =

American politician from Arizona

Member of the Arizona Senate from the Santa Cruz County district
- In office January 1917 – December 1918
- Preceded by: Harry J. Karns
- Succeeded by: T. P. Thompson

Personal details
- Born: Petersburg, Indiana, U.S.
- Party: Republican
- Spouse(s): Jessie Bohall (1904-?); Margaret Hyde (1922-?)
- Children: 2

Ray Ferguson was an American physician and politician from Arizona who served in the Arizona State Senate from 1917 through 1918, during the 3rd Arizona State Legislature. In addition to his short political career, Ferguson was heavily involved in the mining industry in Arizona and Mexico. Twice he served as the superintendent of the Territorial and State Insane Asylum in Phoenix.

== Early life ==
Ferguson was born in Petersburg, Indiana, son of Major Levi Ferguson, a lawyer and postmaster, and Amelia Thomas. Ferguson graduated from embalming school in Indianapolis, Indiana in 1897, and in 1898 he accepted a position as an embalmer in Wichita, Kansas. In 1890, he moved to Kingman, Kansas to take a position as an embalmer there. The establishment he worked for was also a furniture store, and in 1891 he became a partner in the business, and the name changed to Ferguson & Co. Ferguson was also a member of the Masons.

In 1893 Ferguson sold his share of the furniture/embalming business back to his partner. From 1893 to 1895, Ferguson managed a furniture store in Round Pond, Kansas. After an abortive attempt to begin a business in the mining boomtown of Cripple Creek, Colorado in 1896, Ferguson attended medical school in Kansas City, Kansas. He graduated from the Kansas City Medical College in the spring of 1899. After graduating medical school, he worked for a year as a surgeon at the German Hospital in Kansas City. When his year was up, he visited Nogales, Arizona, where he was offered a position as physician for the Southern Pacific Railroad, which he accepted.

== Career in Arizona ==
In 1900 Ferguson passed the certification for becoming a physician in the Territory of Arizona. He set up a medical and surgery practice in Nogales, Arizona. He was also chief surgeon for the Southern Pacific Railroad. Ferguson was also involved in the mining industry in Arizona. He was co-owner of the Hermosa Mining Company, which he sold in 1903. In 1904 he was one of the incorporators of the World's Fair Mine, which had been in operation since 1891. The company was sold to investors later that same year. After the sale, Ferguson continued on as the company's general manager. He married Jessie Bohall, of Nogales, on April 4, 1904. They had one child, a son, Kent. In 1904 Ferguson was elected chairman of the Santa Cruz County Republican Committee, a position he held through 1910. Ferguson was one of the minority of public officials who supported the concept of dual statehood with New Mexico.

In March 1906 he was appointed superintendent of the Territorial Asylum in Phoenix by Governor J. H. Kibbey. Upon taking the position, he resigned as surgeon for the Southern Pacific Railroad. Upon taking over the asylum he lobbied for funds to expand the facility, including the building of a hospital on the asylum's grounds. He had asked for $15,000, but the legislature appropriated $50,000 in 1907, with half to be spent that year, and the other half in 1908. In late October 1907, Ferguson was violently attacked by one of the asylum's inmates. The man had become agitated, and when Ferguson went to calm him down, the man attacked him with an axe, striking several blows to his head and shoulders with the blunt end, however he did sever an artery in Ferguson's head. He was saved by a guard who discharged a shotgun at the inmate, wounding him. Ferguson was in critical condition. In mid-November he was taken to his home in Kansas to see specialists. In December he was further removed to Kansas, when his injuries were deemed more serious than previously thought. He recuperated in Kansas City, and was fully recovered by February 1908, and returned to Arizona in March, after spending some time at his family's home in Wellington. He resigned as the asylum's superintendent in July 1908.

After resigning from the asylum, Ferguson focused on his many mining interests, in both Arizona and Mexico. He had investments in the La Libertad Mining & Milling Company, and the Leek-McDonald Copper Mine. He was also a large shareholder in the Zambona Development Company. In October 1908, Ferguson and his family moved to Duquesne, where they rented a house. In June 1909, Ferguson moved his family to Tucson. From 1910 to 1911 Ferguson and his family moved back and forth between Tucson and Nogales. In 1912 they moved to Los Angeles, although he continued to maintain his mining interests in Arizona and Mexico.

In late 1915 Ferguson moved back to Arizona, this time to Patagonia, near where he had some of his mining interests. In addition to his mining interests, Ferguson also served as the physician to several local mining camps. In 1916, at the urging of his friends, he ran as the Republican candidate for the State Senate seat from Santa Cruz County. The Democratic incumbent, Harry J. Karns, did not run for re-election. He was replaced on the ballot by Richard Farrell, who had been a member of the State House of Representatives during the 2nd Arizona State Legislature. Ferguson narrowly defeated Farrell in the general election by 13 votes. In 1917 he became the chief surgeon and physician for the Duquesne Mining and Reduction Company. Ferguson ran for re-election in 1918. He lost to Democrat T. P. Thompson in November's general election.

In August 1921 Ferguson was once again appointed as the superintendent of the state insane asylum. He lasted less than a year this time, resigning in July 1922, to accept a position as the general manager at the Stargo Mines near Morenci. In 1922 Ferguson remarried, this time to Margaret Hyde of Phoenix on July 17. Later in his life he lived in Mexico.
