= Winners Get Lost =

1951 novel by Al Perry

- Author: Al Perry
- Publisher: Arizona Silhouettes
- Publication date: 1951, 1964
- Pages: 239

Winners Get Lost is a 1951 novel by Al Perry, which was re-issued in 1964 by Arizona Silhouettes. It received positive reviews in the Democrat and Chronicle, The Tampa Tribune, The Gazette, the Fairbanks Daily News-Miner, and The Charlotte Observer. After the 1964 re-issue, it got several more positive reviews from the Arizona Daily Star and the Arizona Republic.
