= Walter Runke =

American politician from Arizona

Member of the Arizona Senate from the Coconino County district
- In office January 1925 – December 1928
- Preceded by: Fred S. Breen
- Succeeded by: Earl C. Slipher

Personal details
- Born: October 6, 1879 Algoma, Wisconsin, U.S.
- Died: November 9, 1964 (aged 85) Flagstaff, Arizona, U.S.
- Party: Republican
- Spouse(s): Mary Jeannette (?-1942, her death); Laura A. Preston (1944-1964, his death)
- Profession: Politician

Walter Runke (October 6, 1879 - November 9, 1964) was an American politician from Arizona. He served two terms in the Arizona State Senate during the 7th and 8th Arizona State Legislatures, holding the seat from Coconino County.

Runke was born on October 6, 1879, in Algoma, Wisconsin. He first moved to Arizona in 1901, settling in Winslow, and working for the Bureau of Indian Affairs. He held several positions with the BIA throughout the western United States, including overseeing the Paiute Indians in Northern Arizona, southern Utah, and western Nevada, heading the Klamath Indian Agency in Oregon, had charge of the Yankton Sioux Tribe in South Dakota, as well as overseeing the Mission Indians in southern California.

In 1916, Runke was charged with the murder of a Navajo man named Taddy Tin. Tin had reportedly the superintendent’s forced recruitment tactics. Runke ordered three reservation police officers: Ashley Wilson, Ed Nash, and David Robinson, to arrest Tin. After a fight broke out between the men, Wilson, who was the local chief of police, fatally shot Tin. All four men were charged with murder. Wilson, Nash, and Robinson were tried jointly, but were all acquitted on the grounds of self-defense by an all-white jury. This happened after a failed motion by the prosecution to have the trial held in Phoenix, citing the sympathy shown to the accused by the locals. Following the acquittals, prosecutors had Runke arrested on new charges of perjury, citing discrepancies in a letter which he wrote to one of the police officers. The case never went to trial.

In 1917, the year the United States joined World War I, Ashley Wilson was drafted into United States Army. He was stationed at Camp Kearney, before being sent to Europe in December 1917. He served in the 30th Infantry Regiment (United States) of the 3rd Infantry Division. Wilson was killed in action in France on August 6, 1918.

In 1920 he and his first wife, Mary Jeanette, moved back to Arizona, this time to Flagstaff, in order for their three children to attend school. While in the Arizona Senate he was one of those responsible for appropriating the funds to build the Marble Canyon bridge. In 1928 he was appointed the postmaster at Flagstaff and remained in the position until 1936. His first wife died in 1942, and he remarried in 1944, to Laura A. Preston. He was very active in both the Federated church, and the Masons. Runke died on November 9, 1964, in his home in Flagstaff.
