= John Francis Connor =

American politician from Arizona

Member of the Arizona Senate from the Santa Cruz County district
- In office January 1931 – August 1933
- Preceded by: J. R. McFarland
- Succeeded by: Paul C. Keefe; W. E. Patterson

Personal details
- Born: 1903 Jerome, Arizona
- Died: 23 August 1961 (aged 57–58) Phoenix, Arizona
- Party: Democratic
- Profession: Politician

John Francis Connor was an American politician from Arizona. He served a single full term in the Arizona State Senate, in the 10th, after having been appointed to fill the unexpired term of J. R. McFarland, who resigned in January 1931. He held one of the two seats from Yavapai County.

== Biography ==
Connor was born in Jerome, Arizona in 1903. His parents, Mr. and Mrs. David Connor, built the historic Hotel Connor in 1898. The hotel was destroyed by fire in 1898, and then shortly after being rebuilt, was gutted by another fire in 1899, after which it was rebuilt again. Connor was left an orphan at the age of fourteen upon the death of his father. His mother had died in 1903. The Connor Hotel was left to John. He was an alumnus of Saint Louis University and the University of Southern California, where he received his law degree. He was admitted to the Arizona bar in 1928.

In January 1931, he was appointed to the Arizona State Senate, to fill the unexpired term of J. R. McFarland, who resigned. At the time of his appointment to the State Senate, he was the youngest practicing attorney in Yavapai County. In 1932 he ran for re-election and won. Later that same year he was appointed by Governor Hunt to one of the three seats on the state's Commission on Uniform State Laws. In August 1933, Connor was appointed the Assistant Attorney General by Arthur T. LaPrade. This forced him to resign from the State Senate. Other political posts he occupied included assistant county attorney for Yavapai County and a Maricopa County superior court judge. He died on August 23, 1961, in Good Samaritan Hospital in Phoenix, Arizona.
