= Dan P. Jones =

American politician from Arizona

Member of the Arizona Senate from the Maricopa County district
- In office January 1927 – December 1928
- Preceded by: J. J. Cox; H. A. Davis
- Succeeded by: Allan K. Perry; J. G. Peterson

Member of the Arizona House of Representatives from the Maricopa County district
- In office March 1912 – December 1914
- In office January 1921 – December 1924

Personal details
- Born: April 1, 1856 Fairview, Utah
- Died: July 6, 1935 (aged 79)
- Party: Democratic
- Spouse: Mary E. Merrill
- Children: 12
- Profession: Politician

Dan P. Jones was an American politician from Arizona. He served a single term in the Arizona State Senate during the 8th Arizona State Legislature, holding one of the two seats from Maricopa County. Prior to that he had served three terms in the Arizona House of Representatives, during the 1st, 5th, and 6th Arizona State Legislatures. During the 6th Legislature, he was elected Speaker of the House. He was also very involved in the education system in Mesa, serving as its board president, as well as in The Church of Jesus Christ of Latter-day Saints (LDS Church).

== Biography ==
Jones was born on April 1, 1856, in Fairview, Utah, son of Daniel W. and Harriet Emily Colton Jones. The family moved to Arizona from Utah, settling in Lehi in 1877. While there, he served as bishop to the Indian mission there. Jones was among the first Mormon settlers who came to Arizona in 1877 and helped create Mesa, Arizona. In 1878, after his arrival in Mesa, he married Mary E. Merrill, and the couple had twelve children. He remained active in the LDS Church, and served on the board of governors of the Maricopa Stake for 44 years, until 1926. He was a farmer by vocation, and served as chairman of the Salt River Valley Water Users' Association, part of the Salt River Project, for seventeen years.

In 1901 he was elected justice of the peace in Lehi, and continued in that capacity until 1926. In 1911, he was elected as one of six representatives to the Arizona House of Representatives for the 1st Arizona State Legislature. In July 1914 he resigned from the House, due to his obtaining a position as the assistant superintendent of irrigation in the state's reclamation department. He was also active in education in Mesa, at one point serving as the president of its board of education. In 1920, he ran again for the State House of Representatives. He won the Democrat primary by a slim margin, and was unopposed in November's general election. He ran for re-election in 1922, again with a close race in the Democrat primary. He then easily beat his Republican opponent, Robert Bowen, in the general election in November. During the 6th Legislature, he was elected Speaker of the House.

In 1924 he did not run for the House again, instead attempting to become a State Senator. He was one of seven candidates in the Democrat primary, running for two slots. He was not in the top two. He attempted to run for the State Senate again in 1926, and this time was elected. He did not run for re-election again in 1928, instead serving as chaplain in the Senate in the 9th Arizona State Legislature, a role he continued during the next two legislatures. In April 1935 he suffered a massive heart attack which left him partially paralyzed and confined to bed. He died due to complications of the heart attack on July 6, 1935, at his home in Mesa. After his death, his body lay in state in the Arizona State Capitol.
