= Joe C. Haldiman =

American politician from Arizona

- Haldiman, ca. 1940

Member of the Arizona Senate from the Maricopa County district
- In office January 1931 – December 1932
- Preceded by: Allan K. Perry; J. G. Peterson
- Succeeded by: James Minotto

Personal details
- Party: Democratic
- Profession: Politician

Joe C. Haldiman was an American politician from Arizona. He served three terms in the Arizona State Senate during the 10th, 12th, and 15th Arizona State Legislatures, holding one of the two seats from Maricopa County.

== Biography ==
Haldiman was born in Missouri in 1895. His family moved to Phoenix, Arizona in 1909. He graduated from Phoenix schools, and was a graduate of the University of Arizona. Haldiman married Blanche Elizabeth Birdno of Safford, Arizona on April 15, 1917. They had three children, two sons, John B. and Joseph C. Jr. and one daughter Elizabeth.

Would also serve in the Arizona State Senate. He began the Haldiman Brothers Insurance Agency in 1919. Between 1927 and 1929 he was a co-owner of the Phoenix Gazette, as well as publishing the Arizona Farmer magazine.

Haldiman ran for the Arizona State Senate in 1930. He finished first of three candidates in the Democrat primary, and was the top vote-getter in the November general election. He ran for re-election in 1932. There was a five-man race in the Democrat primary, and initially he was declared one of the two winners, along with Frank T. Pomeroy. However, James Minotto, who finished third, contested the election and demanded a recount. After the votes were counted a second time, it was found that Haldiman had actually finished third, so he was not one of the two Democrat nominees. In 1934 neither of the incumbent Democrats ran, Haldiman and George A. Johnson won a four-man primary, and then ran uncontested in November's general election. When the legislature convened in January 1935, Haldiman was elected President of the Senate. In 1936 Haldiman did not for re-election to the State Senate, instead choosing to run for the Democrat nomination to run for Arizona's seat in the U. S. House of Representatives. He finished fourth in a field of eleven.

1940 saw Haldiman once again running for the State Senate, in a field of 10 candidates. He finished with the highest vote total of all 10. In the general election, Haldiman and his fellow Democrat, Marvin E. Smith, faced off against a single Republican opponent, Richard H. Schellschmidt. They easily defeated him. He did not seek re-election in 1942. In 1952 Haldiman ran for the governorship of Arizona. He won a close race against State Senator Sam J. Head in the Democrat primary. He went up against incumbent Republican Howard Pyle, who easily defeated him in the general election 156,592 to 103,693.

In 1964, he retired, selling his insurance agency to his son, John. Haldiman died on April 4, 1968, in St. Joseph's Hospital in Phoenix.
