= F. A. Woodward =

American politician (1852–1933)

Member of the Arizona Senate from the Gila County district
- In office January 1921 – December 1922
- Preceded by: J. Warren Young
- Succeeded by: Alfred Kinney

Personal details
- Born: January 5, 1852 Worcester, Massachusetts, U.S.
- Died: June 13, 1933 (aged 81) Globe, Arizona, U.S.
- Party: Republican
- Spouse: Marana S. Soule
- Children: 2
- Profession: Politician

Frank A. Woodward (January 5, 1852 – June 13, 1933) was an American politician from Arizona. He served a single term in the Arizona State Senate during the 5th Arizona State Legislature, holding one of the two seats from Gila County. Originally from Massachusetts, he also lived in Minneapolis, Minnesota and West Superior, Wisconsin, where he was mayor, before moving to Arizona. Aside from his political career, he was engaged in the railroad and clothing industries, before becoming involved in the mining industry.

== Biography ==
Woodward was born in Worcester, Massachusetts, on January 5, 1852. Woodward married Marana S. Soule of Wales, Massachusetts on June 27, 1873. The couple had two children, a son, Herbert, and a daughter, Ella Frances. Herbert attended the University of Berkeley, where he received a degree in mining engineering, and went to work for his father in 1908 as supervisor of the Iron Cap mine. By 1886 the Woodwards had relocated to Minneapolis, Minnesota, where he was engaged in the clothing business, managing the Plymouth Clothing House. In 1892 he moved to West Superior, Wisconsin, where he engaged in the clothing business, and was elected as the president of the chamber of commerce. In 1894 he was elected mayor of West Superior.

In 1899 he was living in Boston, Massachusetts, and was the treasurer and manager of the Chippewa Copper Mining Company. In 1901 the company was formally incorporated. In 1905 he was part of a group of men who incorporated the National Mining Exploration Co. (NME), headquartered in Boston, with Woodward as the secretary and treasurer. In March 1906 he traveled to Globe, Arizona, to develop the Iron Cap Mine for the company. The project had been brought to the attention of Woodward in late 1905, and Woodward got NME to put up the money for developing the mineral property. Woodward relocated to Globe, Arizona in 1906. NME also owned the Fumarole Mine, located near Kelvin, on the Gila River, which Woodward, as general manager of NME, also was in control of.

In 1907 he was also the general manager of the Bonita Mining Company, near Safford. In 1910, he was elected as president of NME. In 1920 he ran for one of the two seats in the Arizona State Senate from Gila County, winning in November's general election. Woodward ran for re-election in 1922, but lost in the general election to Democrat Alfred Kinney. In 1922 he was again selected by the Republicans to run for the State Senate, but once again was defeated in the general election in November.

By 1925, the Iron Cap mine was winding down on production. Later that year, Woodward took over management of the Christmas Mine. The mine had been closed for several years, but was re-opened and a new 400-ton per day mill was constructed in 1929.

Woodward was a member of the Odd Fellows. He died on June 13, 1933, in his home in Globe, after an illness of approximately one year.
