= W. A. Saunders =

American politician from Arizona

Member of the Arizona Senate from the Apache County district
- In office January 1921 – December 1922
- Preceded by: E. I. Whiting
- Succeeded by: Fred Colter

Personal details
- Party: Republican
- Profession: Politician

W. A. "Art" Saunders was an American cattle rancher and politician from Arizona. He served a single term in the Arizona State Senate during the 5th Arizona State Legislature, holding the seat from Apache County. In addition, he served several years as a supervisor on the board of supervisors in Apache County, as well as the county surveyor in Navajo County.

== Biography ==
Saunders operated a cattle ranch in between St. Joseph and Penzance, near Holbrook. In 1908 he ran for Navajo County surveyor, and won in the November general election. In 1911, he ran for re-election, easily defeating his Democrat opponent, Charles Perkins. In 1912, he was one of the founding members of the Stockmen's Association of Navajo and Apache Counties, and served as its president. In 1914, he sold his ranch near Penzance to the Babbitt Brothers. After the sale, he and his partner, Tom Tucker, purchased the Long H. ranch in Apache County. He also managed the ranch. In addition to managing the ranch, Saunders was also the foreman of the Tucker-Church Cattle Company.

In 1916, he was one of two Republicans elected to the County Board of Supervisors in Apache County. In 1917, Saunders and two partners formed the Apache Cattle Company. In August 1917, after the United States entered World War I, Saunders volunteered for the army and was sent to Fort Leon Springs in Texas for officer training. In October 1917, he injured his arm during training, and was discharged. In January 1919, Saunders resigned his position as one of the supervisors of Apache County. In 1919, Saunders brother was killed when the horse he was riding fell and rolled on him. Saunders raised his brother's son, Harry as his own.

In 1920 he was selected by the Republicans to run for the sole state senate seat from Apache County. He narrowly defeated Democrat A. J. McKay in the November election. He did not run for re-election in 1922. In September 1922, Saunders was chosen to be the land examiner for the Santa Fe Railway in Arizona and New Mexico, which necessitated him to move to their headquarters in Kingman, Arizona, Mohave County. Simultaneous to this appointment, Saunders culminated a deal with the Babbit Brothers to purchase their significant holdings in Apache County. In addition, Saunders procured the option on the adjoining lands of C. H. Odell. These transactions created one of the largest cattle ranches in the United States.

In December 1924, Saunders married Edith Hill of Kingman, in a wedding ceremony in San Francisco, California. Edith died suddenly on May 29, 1929, in a hospital in Gallup, New Mexico. She was taken to Fulton, Kansas for burial. His nephew, Harry, had attended Edith's funeral, having flown in from Virginia, where he was serving in the Army at Langley Field. On his return to Langley following the funeral, the plane he was flying crashed in foggy conditions in Maryland, killing both him and his engineer.
