= General Conway =

General Conway may refer to:

- Henry Seymour Conway (1721–1795), British Army general
- James T. Conway (born 1947), U.S. Marine Corps four-star general
- Michael Conway (British Army officer) (fl. 1980s–2010s), British Army major general
- Theodore J. Conway (1909–1990), U.S. Army four-star general
- Thomas Conway (1735–c. 1800), Continental Army major general

== See also ==
- Attorney General Conway (disambiguation)
