= Frank T. Pomeroy =

American politician from Arizona

- Pomeroy, ca. 1930

Member of the Arizona Senate from the Maricopa County district
- In office January 1937 – December 1938
- Preceded by: George A. Johnson; Joe C. Haldiman
- Succeeded by: James Minotto; Charles M. Menderson
- In office January 1931 – December 1934
- Preceded by: Allan K. Perry; J. G. Peterson
- Succeeded by: George A. Johnson; Joe C. Haldiman

Member of the Arizona House of Representatives from the Maricopa County district
- In office January 1925 – December 1926

Personal details
- Born: September 15, 1870 Paris, Idaho
- Died: November 4, 1954 (aged 84) Mesa, Arizona
- Party: Democratic
- Parents: Francis Martin Pomeroy (father); Sarah Matilda Coburn (mother)
- Profession: Politician

Frank T. Pomeroy was an American politician from Arizona. He served three terms in the Arizona State Senate during the 10th, 11th, and 13th Arizona State Legislatures, holding one of the two seats from Maricopa County. Prior to that, he had served a single term in the Arizona House of Representatives, during the 7th Arizona State Legislature. He was one of the original settlers of Mesa, Arizona.

== Biography ==
Pomeroy was born on September 15, 1870, in Paris, Idaho, to Francis Martin Pomeroy and Sarah Matilda Coburn. His father was one of the original Mormon pioneers who traveled to Utah with Brigham Young in 1847. With his parents, Pomeroy walked from Idaho to what is now Mesa, Arizona in 1877, and were part of the party which founded the town of Mesa. They left Idaho on Pomeroy's birthday in 1877, and arrived in Mesa on February 14, 1878. In the 1900s he served in several official capacities in Mesa, including justice of the peace, city clerk, and city treasurer. By 1903 he was a partner in the Pomeroy Bros., a real estate firm, which by 1908 had become the Pomeroy-Guthrie Realty Co. In 1904 he purchased an 80-acre ranch outside of Mesa.

In 1924, Pomeroy ran for the Arizona House of Representatives, and defeated Republican Elijah Allen by 23 votes in a very close race. Pomeroy ran for re-election in 1926, and won the Democrat nomination, but in a rematch with Allen, lost a very close race by 40 votes. In 1930 he ran for the Arizona State Senate. He finished second in a six-man race in the Democrat primary, and he and his fellow Democrat Joe C. Haldiman, easily defeated their Republican opponents in the general election. He ran for re-election in 1932. There was a five-man race in the Democrat primary, and initially he was declared one of the two winners, along with Joe C. Haldiman, getting the second-highest vote total. However, James Minotto, who finished third, contested the election and demanded a recount. After the votes were counted a second time, it was found that Haldiman had actually finished third, and Pomeroy was actually the top vote-getter. He did not run for re-election in 1934. During his two sessions in the Senate, he had authored the legislation for the state income and sales taxes. Both were passed, but the state supreme court ruled the sales tax, called the "intangibles tax", unconstitutional. Pomeroy ran for the Senate again in 1936, with the stated purpose of re-writing the intangibles tax to be in accordance with the guidelines set forth by the supreme court. He finished second in an 8-person field in the Democrat primary, and again he and his Democrat running mate easily defeated the Republicans in November. He got the intangibles tax passed, and then resigned from the Senate to take up a position on the state tax commission. He was known as the "father of Arizona's state sales tax".

In 1940, he uncovered the original 1863 peace treaty signed between the United States and five Indian tribes: the Maricopa, Pima, Yuma, Hualapai, and Chemehuevi. For the last ten years of his life, Pomeroy was a Patriarch of the Latter Day Saints Church. At the time of his death, Pomeroy was one of only six members of the original settlers of Mesa still living. He died unexpectedly at his home in Mesa on November 4, 1954.
