= T. J. Bouldin =

American politician (1878–1939)

- Bouldin, c. 1939

Member of the Arizona Senate from the Apache County district
- In office January 1931 – December 1932
- Preceded by: E. I. Whiting
- Succeeded by: Dodd L. Greer

Personal details
- Born: 1878 Paint Rock Valley, Alabama, US
- Died: September 16, 1939 (aged 60–61) St. Johns, Arizona, US
- Party: Democratic
- Education: Alabama Medical College
- Profession: Politician

Thomas Jefferson Bouldin (1878 – September 16, 1939) was an American politician. He served a single term in the Arizona State Senate during the 10th Arizona State Legislature, holding the seat from Apache County.

== Biography ==
Bouldin was born in 1878 in Paint Rock Valley, Alabama. He graduated from Alabama Medical College and opened a medical practice in Alabama, before moving to St. Johns, Arizona in September 1909. During World War I, he served as a doctor in the U. S. Army. In 1930, he ran for and was elected to the Arizona State Senate, from Apache County. He did not seek re-election in 1932. Bouldin died in St. Johns on September 16, 1939, aged 60 or 61, from a heart attack.
