= Louise A. Moore =

American state legislator

Louise A. Moore (1881 or 1882 – 1954) was a state legislator in Arizona. She lived in Phoenix and represented Maricopa County in the Arizona House of Representatives in 1941. She was a Democrat. She lived at 504 North 7th Street in Phoenix and her occupation was listed as a housewife. On January 25, 1955 a Memorial was presented in the legislature as HR9 honoring her career.

Moore moved to Phoenix in 1915, she was a Democrat, the wife of a banker and a cattleman, and she was active in women's clubs. In 1942 she campaigned for the Democratic nomination for a seat in congress. She died in September 28, 1954 in Los Angeles at the age of 72.

== See also ==
- 15th Arizona State Legislature
- Female state legislators in the United States
