= Harry J. Karns =

American politician in Arizona

Member of the Arizona Senate from the Santa Cruz County district
- In office January 1915 – January 1917
- Preceded by: James A. Harrison
- Succeeded by: Ray Ferguson

Personal details
- Born: 1880 Jamestown, New York, US
- Died: April 29, 1956 (aged 75–76) Tucson, Arizona, US
- Party: Democratic
- Spouse: Molly
- Children: Helena, Glenna
- Profession: Politician

Harry John Karns (1880 – April 29, 1956) was an Arizona politician who served a single term in the Arizona State Senate during the 2nd Arizona State Legislature. He served 3 consecutive terms as mayor of Nogales from 1927 to 1933. While in office, he oversaw the paving of the streets of Nogales, installation of a sewer system, and street lights.

== Personal life ==
Karns was born in Jamestown, New York in 1880. He moved with his family when he was very young to the Pittsburgh area. In the early 1890s, Karns attended the Collegiate Institute in Towanda, Pennsylvania. In 1899, while working as a well-driller on an oil well in Wellsville, Ohio, Karns received serious burns when a boiler exploded, killing several others. He was living in Wilkinsburg, Pennsylvania, at the time. He married his wife, Molly, on January 1, 1900. The couple had two daughters, Helena and Glenna.

Karns moved to Nogales, Arizona, in 1907. Karns was a charter member of the Nogales Chamber of Commerce. He was considered an authority on the history of the early Southwestern United States, particularly the mission-building era of Eusebio Kino. Karns and Arizona Superior Court judge W. A. O'Connor, rediscovered the ruins of Fort Buchanan in August 1930. He was the first president of the Pimería Alta Historical Society, which he formed in 1938. In 1954 he translated the diary of Captain Juan Mateo Manje, and published it entitled, La Luz de Tierra Incognito. Manje was the commander of the Spanish military forces in the area during Kino's time.

Karns died from a heart condition on April 29, 1956, in Nogales.

== Political career ==
In July 1914 Karns announced his intent to run for the Arizona State Senate. He ran unopposed in the Democratic primary and defeated Republican A. S. Henderson in November's General election. He did not run for re-election in 1916. While in the State Senate he sponsored legislation to build the first bridge over the Santa Cruz River, which was dedicated in February 1917.

In 1918 he ran for the Nogales School Board, was "easily defeated" in the March election, by W. F. Chenowith. In 1920, he was part of a non-partisan ticket, versus a Democrat ticket, which ran for the Nogales Board of Aldermen. He was elected as an alderman. In 1926 Karns was elected to a board of freeholders, tasked with writing the charter for the city of Nogales.

In 1927 he led an opposition non-partisan ticket to the Democrats' ticket for Mayor and Aldermen of Nogales. It was the first election after the adoption in 1926 of the city's new charter. The election saw a rematch of Karns versus W. F. Chenowith. The two had squared off in 1918 for the Nogales school board, and that time saw Chenowith defeating Karns by a large margin. This election was hotly contested, with over 95% of registered voters casting votes. Karns' ticket won by a large majority. He took office on June 1. During his first term in office, he saw the installation of a new series of ornamental lighting in the city and brokered a deal with Southern Pacific to share the costs of paving the streets in Nogales, which was to cost $1,000.000. Also during his first term, he pushed through a $100,000 bond issue to upgrade the city's water supply. He announced his intention to run for re-election to the mayorship in February 1929. He was easily re-elected by a 3–1 majority, along with his entire slate of aldermen in April. Karns announced his intent to run for re-election in 1931, and was expected to coast to a win with no opposition. However, two challengers presented themselves, former alderman H. R. Renshaw, and former state senator Andrew Bettwy. The primary election in April did not produce an outcome where one of the candidates received more than 50% of the vote, so a general election was scheduled for May 5. Bettwy had garnered the most votes in the primary with 501, while Karns came in second with 442. Those two faced off in the general election, with Karns winning by 85 votes, 673–588, getting his third consecutive term as mayor. Karns did not seek re-election in 1933.

In 1946 Karns decided to re-enter politics and ran in the Democratic primary for the state senate seat from Santa Cruz County against incumbent W. H. Hathaway. Hathaway defeated him in the April primary.

== Career outside politics ==
In 1908, he purchased one of his partner's share in an ore processing mill, giving him 85% ownership. The mill processed the ore from the La Mejia Mine. However, the mill and mine did not turn out to be a successful venture. With two partners, he began the Sonora Auto Company, and by 1909 was the sole owner and operator. This company became known as the Karn Bros, since Karns brought in his brother, W. E. Karns to help with the business. The company finally incorporated in 1913. In February 1922 Karns and his brother sold Karns Bros. to a group of investors. At the time it was one of the oldest and largest auto firms in southern Arizona.

He was one of the incorporators of the Nogales Fire Department in 1910, and in 1911, he was one of the men who organized the Nogales Municipal Water Works Association, serving as its first vice president. His company, Karns Bros., which he operated with his brother W. E. Karns, was granted the contract to install the new water system, pumping water from the Santa Cruz River to Nogales.

In 1929 an American pilot, working for the Mexican government, was forced to land behind enemy lines during the Cristero War. He was captured by rebel forces. Karns negotiated with the rebel leaders and secured his release after a few days.

In 1936, Karns opened the first tequila distillery in the United States in Nogales.
