= Joe Conway (American politician) =

American politician

8th Attorney General of Arizona
- In office January 4, 1937 – 1944
- Governor: Rawghlie Clement Stanford; Robert Taylor Jones; Sidney Preston Osborn
- Preceded by: John L. Sullivan
- Succeeded by: John L. Sullivan

Personal details
- Born: December 3, 1898; Salt Lake City, Utah, US
- Died: November 19, 1945 (aged 46); Florence, Arizona, US
- Political party: Republican

Joe Conway (December 3, 1898 – November 19, 1945) was an American politician who served as the Attorney General of Arizona from 1937 to 1944.

== Education and career ==
Conway, the son of Catherine Ward (1880–1939) and Mr. Conway, was born in Salt Lake City, on December 3, 1898, but grew up in Winkelman, Arizona. After graduating from high school, he went to Arizona State College in Tempe, Arizona, where he graduated in 1918. During his studies he was editor of the yearbook and head of the school newspaper. He received awards in basketball and baseball. He was also president of the student bodyand a club. After graduating college he joined the armed forces. He then went to the University of Arizona, studied law, and graduated in 1924. While in law school, Conway worked in the inning industry and for the newspapers in Tucson. He then worked for the Miami Evening Bulletin in Miami and then began practicing as a lawyer in the mining community in 1924. In 1928, he moved to Phoenix, where he opened a legal practice.

Conway's was first elected attorney general in 1936. During his first term, he attracted national attention by threatening to seize all of the assets of the Phelps Dodge Corporation, Arizona's largest mining company. This forced the company to pay $4 million in property taxes. The resulting litigation lasted most of the Great Depression. Conway was re-elected attorney general three times. He held the post until 1944 when he decided to run for the U.S. Senate against the democratic incumbent Carl Hayden. Conway lost in the primaries. Conway said a week later that he would run for the Arizona Attorney General's next election.

Conway died on November 19, 1945, in a car accident in Florence, Arizona. His body was buried at Greenwood Memory Lawn Cemetery in Phoenix.
