= John R. Lyons =

American politician from Arizona

Member of the Arizona Senate from the Gila County district
- In office January 1925 – December 1930
- Preceded by: W. D. Claypool
- Succeeded by: E. H. McEachren

Personal details
- Party: Democratic
- Profession: Politician

John R. Lyons (1860–1929) was an American politician from Arizona. He served three terms in the Arizona State Senate during the 7th and 8th, and 9th Arizona State Legislatures, holding one of the two seats from Gila County.

Lyons was born in 1860. He was prominently involved in the Woodmen of the World for over 35 years, serving as their first state manager in Arizona and New Mexico. Lyons became ill on September 23, 1929, and died four days later at the home of his daughter in Globe, Arizona. He was in the middle of his third term, and E. H. McEachren was appointed to fill out the remainder of his term.
