= Joe Conway =

Joe or Jo Conway may refer to:

- Joe Conway (American politician), American politician and Arizona attorney general
- Joe Conway (Irish politician)
- Joe Conway, screenwriter of Paradise, Texas (film)
- Joe Conway, a character on Skyhawks (TV series)
- Joe Conway, candidate for Yeovil (UK Parliament constituency)
- Jo Conway, character in Babes on Broadway
