= T. P. Thompson (Arizona politician) =

American politician from Arizona

Member of the Arizona Senate from the Santa Cruz County district
- In office January 1919 – December 1920
- Preceded by: Ray Ferguson
- Succeeded by: J. L. Schleimer

Personal details
- Party: Democratic
- Profession: Politician

Thomas P. Thompson was an American politician from Arizona. He served a single term in the Arizona State Senate during the 4th Arizona State Legislature, holding the seat from Santa Cruz County.

== Biography ==
In 1911 he ran for county assessor in Santa Cruz County. He defeated fellow Democrat A. A. Doherty in the primary, and followed that up with a victory over Republican Richard H. Clarke in December's general election. He did not run for re-election in 1914.

Thompson was a restaurateur for the Southern Pacific Railroad Thompson also had a ranch in the San Rafael Valley. In March 1918, Thompson and his partner, J. M. Wilson, opened a restaurant in Nogales. Named the Shamrock Cafe, it was located next to the Lyric Theater.

In 1918 he ran for the Arizona State Senate seat from Santa Cruz County. He defeated the Republican incumbent, Ray Ferguson in the general election in November.

In 1919, Thompson expanded his business interests when he purchased a cotton farm near Aztec. In 1919, he further expanded his business when he opened a restaurant in Desdemona, Texas, near Ranger, both Texas oil boom towns.
