= C. C. Crenshaw =

American politician from Arizona

Member of the Arizona Senate from the Santa Cruz County district
- In office January 1931 – December 1932
- Preceded by: Andrew Bettwy
- Succeeded by: J. A. Harrison

Personal details
- Party: Democratic
- Profession: Politician

Clarence C. Crenshaw was an American politician from Arizona. He served a single term in the Arizona State Senate, in the 10th, holding the single seat from Santa Cruz County. Crenshaw was originally from Memphis, Tennessee, born in 1883.

Crenshaw was a member of the Nogales Board of Aldermen. In 1924, Crenshaw was elected to the Arizona House of Representatives, holding the single seat from Santa Cruz County. In 1930, Crenshaw ran for the Arizona State Senate. He defeated F. A. French in the Democrat primary, and then defeated O. A. Smith in the general election in November. He ran for re-election in 1932, but was defeated by James A. Harrison in the Democrat primary. In 1938, he was made a police court judge in Nogales. He held that position until he became ill in 1939. In June of that year he entered the Veteran's Hospital in Tucson, where he remained until his death on February 24, 1940.
