= E. H. McEachren =

American politician from Arizona

- McEachren, ca. 1940

Member of the Arizona Senate from the Gila County district
- In office November 1929 – December 1938
- Preceded by: John R. Lyons
- Succeeded by: A. R. Edwards

Personal details
- Party: Democratic
- Profession: Politician

Everett Hunter McEachren was an American politician from Arizona. He served a four consecutive terms in the Arizona State Senate during the 10th through 13th Arizona State Legislatures, holding one of the two seats from Gila County. He had served a portion of the 9th Arizona State Legislature, having been appointed to serve the unexpired term of John R. Lyons, who had died in office in November 1929.

== Biography ==
McEachren was born in 1878 in Antigonish, Nova Scotia. He was a veteran of the Spanish–American War, having served seven years in the U. S. Navy. After the war he moved to Arizona, arriving in Bisbee, Arizona in 1902, and worked for the Calumet and Arizona Copper Mining Company. He married Roxie Ester Perkins on August 16, 1907, in Emporia, Kansas. In 1912, he moved from Bisbee to Miami, Arizona, where he served as justice of the peace. He was very active in the Masons, holding several state posts, including the grand high priest of the Royal Arch Masons, and the grand master of the Arizona lodge.

In October 1929, State Senator John R. Lyons became ill and died while in office. McEachren was appointed on November 6, 1929, to fill out the remainder of his term. In 1930, McEachren chose to run for a full term of his own. He and Al Kinney defeated Howard Sprouse and Charles Carnell in the Democrat primary, and were unopposed in the general election in November. He was re-elected in 1932, 1934, and 1936. He attempted to run for a fifth consecutive term in 1938, but lost to A. R. Edwards in the Democrat primary. In 1940, Governor Robert Jones appointed McEachren to the Arizona Highway Commission. McEachren died on March 3, 1945, after a two-month illness, most of which was spent in the Miami-Inspiration Hospital in Globe.
