= Hugo Farmer =

American politician from Arizona

Member of the Arizona Senate from the Yuma County district
- In office January 1945 – December 1948
- Preceded by: H. H. Baker
- Succeeded by: Joseph D. Mansfield
- In office January 1929 – December 1934
- Preceded by: Mulford Winsor
- Succeeded by: Nellie T. Bush

Personal details
- Party: Democratic
- Profession: Politician

Hugo Farmer (1878–1957) was an American politician from Arizona. He served five terms in the Arizona State Senate during the 9th through 11th Arizona State Legislatures, and again during the 17th and 18th Arizona State Legislatures, holding the seat from Yuma County.

== Biography ==
Farmer was born in 1878. Farmer had a ranch outside of Yuma, Arizona. In the early 1900s Farmer worked for the Southern Pacific Railroad, until 1906 when he obtained a job as a guard at Yuma Territorial Prison, a position he held for 3 years, until September 1909, when the prison was closed and all prisoners were transferred to Arizona State Prison Complex – Florence.

In 1914, he was elected as the clerk of the Superior Court, and continued in that position through 1919, after being re-elected in 1918. He then served as United States Commissioner at Yuma from 1920 to 1924. In September 1928, Farmer defeated incumbent Nellie T. Bush in the Democrat primary for the Arizona State Senate, and went on to win the November general election. He was re-elected in 1930 and 1932. He did not run for re-election in 1934. In 1944 incumbent H. H. Baker did not run for re-election to the State Senate. Farmer ran in his place, and was elected again to the Senate. He ran unopposed in both the primary and general election in 1946. He did not run for re-election in 1948. Farmer was also a member of the Colorado River Commission. Farmer died on June 28, 1957, in the Arizona Pioneers Home in Prescott, Arizona.
