= J. Warren Young =

American politician from Arizona

Member of the Arizona Senate from the Gila County district
- In office January 1919 – December 1920
- Preceded by: Alfred Kinney
- Succeeded by: F. A. Woodward

Personal details
- Party: Democratic
- Profession: Politician

J. Warren Young was an American politician from Arizona. He served a single term in the Arizona State Senate during the 4th Arizona State Legislature.

== Biography ==
Young was born in 1868. By 1897 he was residing in Globe, where he was partner with his brother in the Silver Palace Saloon. In 1898 he began a brickyard with a partner in Globe. In 1898 his brother, A. R. Young, sold him the Silver Palace Saloon. In 1898 one his mining claims, the Wedge, struck a rich vein of gold. Over the next several years, Young built several commercial properties in Globe, including a hotel and a rooming house.

In 1899 he sold the Silver Palace Saloon to J. J. Keegan. In June 1899 he returned to Illinois and married Lillian S. Kearney. The couple had three children, two sons and a daughter, Vernon, Royal, and Martha. In November 1899 he, along with two other partners, incorporated another of his mining interests as the Eureka Copper Company. The mine proved quite lucrative.

In 1900 he built a house in Globe. In June 1904, Young sold his home in Globe, although keeping his commercial interests, and moved to Chihuahua, where he pursued mining interests. In 1908, Young and his partners sold the Eureka Mine for $300,000. After that sale, although still residing in Chihuahua, Young purchased a prime lot on Broad Street in Globe for $20,000. By 1913 Young had moved back to Globe. After his return to Globe, he continued to pursue his mining interests.

In 1918, Young, who was Gila County Chairman for the Democrats, ran for one of the two seats from Gila County in the Arizona State Senate. With incumbent W. D. Claypool, he was elected to Senate in the 4th Arizona State Legislature. Young ran for re-election to the Senate in 1920, however he lost to Frank McCann in the Democrat's primary. Young died suddenly of a heart condition on New Year's Day 1933 at his home in Globe, Arizona.
