= Whiting Brothers =

Service station chain based in Arizona

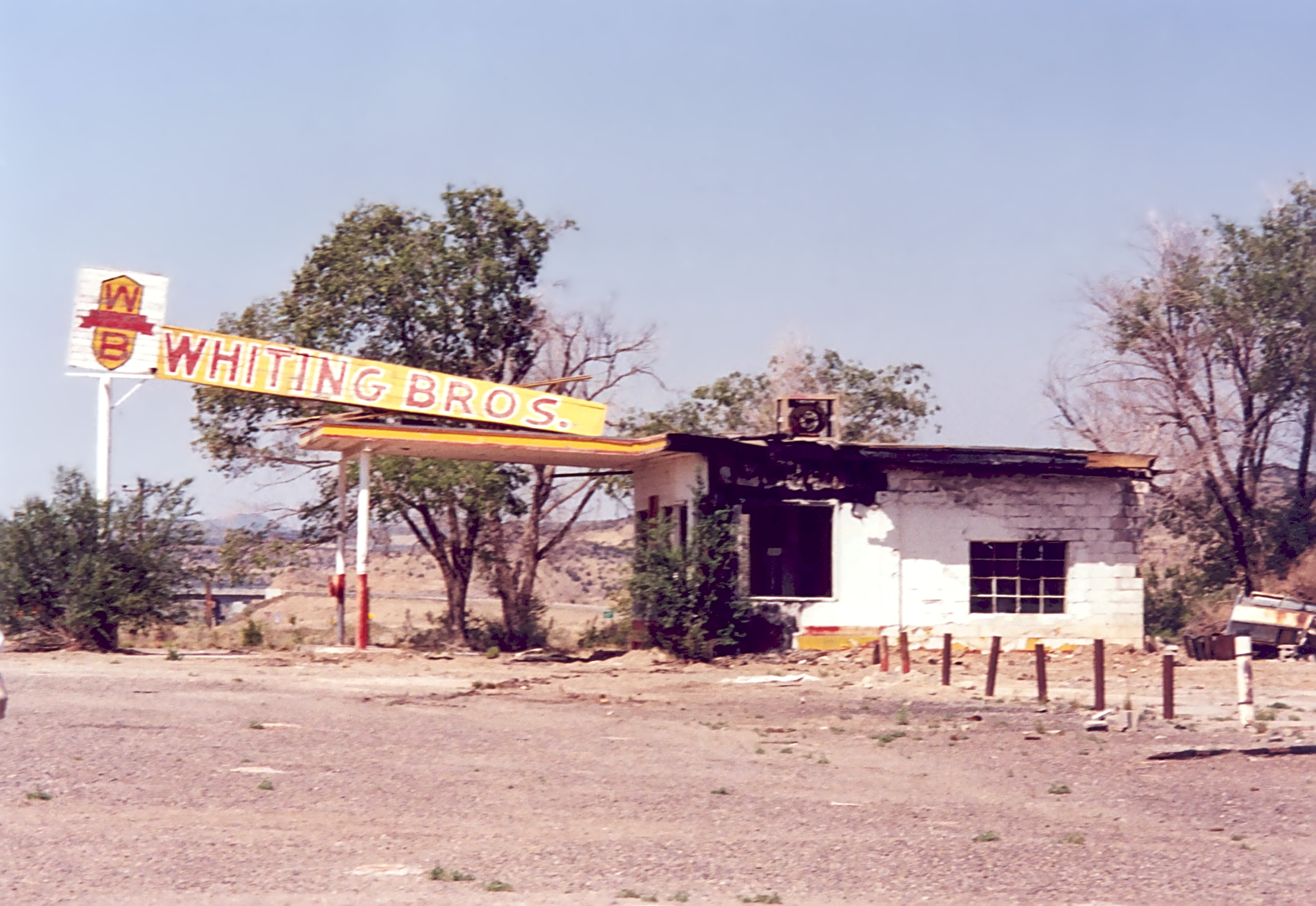
- Whiting Brothers logo on abandoned New Mexico station
- Company type: Private
- Industry: filling stations, motels, truck stops and roadside cafés
- Founded: 1926; 100 years ago
- Founder: Arthur, Earnest, Eddie and Ralph Whiting
- Defunct: mid-1980s
- Fate: stations sold individually or abandoned
- Headquarters: St. Johns, Arizona, United States
- Number of locations: over 100
- Area served: Southwestern US in Arizona, New Mexico, Utah, Southern California Mojave Desert, southern Nevada, southwestern Colorado, and the Texas panhandle

Whiting Brothers was a chain of gasoline stations established in 1926 and based in St. Johns and Holbrook, Arizona. At its peak, it operated more than a hundred filling stations (including at least forty on the former U.S. Route 66), fifteen motels and various truck stops under a slogan of "quality gas for less".

The business began to decline in the 1970s due to fuel shortages and a drop in traffic at its locations on the US Highway system as these roads were bypassed by Interstate highways. Stations in still-viable locations were sold off individually by the 1980s while many locations on roads long bypassed were simply abandoned.

Some of the vacant stations with the original Whiting Brothers branding still remain, visible but abandoned, on long-bypassed stretches of US Route 66.

== History ==
The distinctive red-on-yellow Whiting Brothers signage and billboards date to 1926, the year U.S. Route 66 was designated across the southwestern United States. The father of the four Whiting brothers was a lumberyard owner, leaving the family well placed to construct small, simple stations at little cost with one or two pumps and a six-foot-tall roadside billboard at various points on the then-new highway.

The first Whiting station was on the National Old Trails Highway in St. Johns, Arizona. As the section of the Old Trails highway serving St Johns was bypassed by Route 66, the brothers placed their first Route 66 filling station in Holbrook. With an ample supply of lumber, construction continued unabated through the Great Depression, serving the Grapes of Wrath-like exodus of 1930s settlers headed westward from Dust Bowl conditions in Oklahoma and Texas. The stations, which did not sell on credit but priced their fuel a few cents cheaper than the major chains, issued a discount card which reduced the price of a gallon by another penny or two. The chain offered stamps (similar to S&H green stamps) to be pasted in a booklet, redeemable for discounts or items at their stations. A fillup in the summer also got one some free ice.

The operator of each individual station was provided with lodging and paid a commission on sales. The Whiting family reinvested profit from the stations, which continued even through the hardest economic times, to build additional fuel stations and motels. The buildings were typically located on inexpensive land on the US Highway system at the edge of towns.

The Whiting family boasted of "Serving the West since 1917", pursuing diverse business interests including lumber, steel, gasoline, cattle and real estate. The family entered the Northern Arizona logging business during World War II. Whiting Brothers executives travelled the roads, keeping a first-hand view of the service provided by their travel company. The chain expanded westward to Mojave, California, Lenwood, California and Barstow, California and eastward to Shamrock, Texas.

Sal Lucero's repair garage (Sal & Inez's Service Station) in Moriarty, New Mexico, purchased in 1985, is the last active station to still display original Whiting Brothers signage. A restoration of two signs at the often-photographed Route 66 station, using a matching grant from the National Park Service Route 66 Corridor Preservation Program, was completed and the first sign re-lit in December 2014.
