= G. W. Nelson =

American politician from Arizona

Member of the Arizona Senate from the Navajo County district
- In office January 1927 – December 1932
- Preceded by: Robert L. Moore
- Succeeded by: Frank M. Siegmund
- In office January 1935 – December 1936
- Preceded by: Frank M. Siegmund
- Succeeded by: Robert L. Moore

Personal details
- Party: Democratic
- Profession: Politician

George Washington Nelson was an American politician from Arizona. He served three consecutive terms in the Arizona State Senate during the 8th through 10th Arizona State Legislatures holding the seat from Navajo County, and again in the 12th Arizona State Legislature.

== Biography ==
He was a veteran of World War I, and after the war, Nelson served as a lieutenant in the artillery reserve corps. In 1926 he ran and won the single Arizona State Senate seat from Navajo County. In 1928 he ran for re-election, and was opposed in the Democrat primary by Robert L. Moore, a former state senator. No Republican ran for the seat, so Nelson was unopposed in the general election. 1930 saw him run again for the Senate, and was unopposed in both the primary and general elections.

In 1932, Nelson decided to run for the Arizona House of Representatives, but was defeated in general election by incumbent Republican Charles J. McQuillan. In 1934, he attempted to return to the State Senate, and was in a three-way race in the Democrat primary, which included incumbent Frank M. Siegmund, who had replaced Nelson in the prior legislature. Nelson was the winner of the primary, and then defeated the Socialist Party candidate by a 20–1 margin in the general election. He decided not to run in 1936, clearing the way for Robert L. Moore to return to the State Senate. He attempted one more run for the State Senate, in 1940, but lost in the Democrat primary to Lloyd Henning, 1,790 to 1,098.
