= James T. McFarland =

American politician

Member of the New York State Senate from the 59th district
- In office January 1, 1973 – December 31, 1978
- Preceded by: District created
- Succeeded by: Walter J. Floss Jr.

Member of the New York State Assembly from the 140th district
- In office January 1, 1967 – December 31, 1972
- Preceded by: Charles D. Henderson
- Succeeded by: John LaFalce

Member of the New York State Assembly from the 154th district
- In office January 1, 1966 – December 31, 1966
- Preceded by: District created
- Succeeded by: District abolished

Personal details
- Born: March 13, 1930 Buffalo, New York
- Died: January 15, 2015 (aged 84) Getzville, New York
- Party: Republican

James T. McFarland (March 13, 1930 – January 15, 2015) was an American lawyer and politician from New York.

== Life ==
He was born on March 13, 1930, in Buffalo, New York. He graduated B.S. from Canisius College in 1951, and J.D. from University of Buffalo Law School in 1954. He served in the U.S. Army from 1954 to 1956. Then he practiced law in Buffalo. He married Geraldine T. Walsh, and they have four children.

McFarland entered politics as a Republican, and became an aide to Assemblyman William E. Adams in 1964. In November 1964, Adams was defeated for re-election, but in November 1965 Adams was elected to the State Senate, and McFarland was elected to Adams's old Assembly seat. McFarland was a member of the New York State Assembly from 1966 to 1972, sitting in the 176th, 177th, 178th and 179th New York State Legislatures.

He was a member of the New York State Senate from 1973 to 1978, sitting in the 180th, 181st and 182nd New York State Legislatures.

He was a member of the New York State Civil Service Commission from 1978 to 1987; and of the New York Public Service Commission from 1987 to 1992.

He died of Alzheimer's disease on January 15, 2015, in Getzville, New York at age 84.

New York State Assembly
Preceded by new district	New York State Assembly; 154th District; 1966	Succeeded by district abolished
Preceded by Charles D. Henderson	New York State Assembly; 140th District; 1967–1972	Succeeded by John J. LaFalce
New York State Senate
Preceded by new district	New York State Senate; 59th District; 1973–1978	Succeeded by Walter J. Floss Jr.
