= Harry W. Hill (politician) =

American politician from Arizona

Member of the Arizona Senate from the Greenlee County district
- In office January 1927 – December 1934
- Preceded by: H. A. Elliott
- Succeeded by: Peter Riley

Personal details
- Party: Democratic
- Profession: Politician

Harry W. Hill was an American politician from Arizona. He served four consecutive terms in the Arizona State Senate during the 8th through 11th Arizona State Legislatures, holding the seat from Greenlee County. He served as the president of the Senate during the 9th and 11th legislatures. At the time of his death in 1954, he was one of only two men to have held the president's role three times.

== Biography ==
Hill was born in 1886 in Clinton, Missouri. In 1910 he moved to Morenci, Arizona, and worked for the Phelps Dodge Corporation.

In 1926 he ran for and won the single seat from Greenlee County in the Arizona State Senate. He ran for re-election in 1928 and won. When the 9th Arizona State Legislature convened in January, they elected Hill as the Senate President. He ran again for re-election in 1930, and won. He ran once more the Senate, in 1932, and once again won. For the second time, when the legislature convened in January, Hill was elected as President of the Senate.

In July 1933, Hill accepted a position as the secretary of the Northern Arizona Securities Company. His duties necessitated his moving from Morenci to Phoenix, as well as being unable to fulfill his senatorial duties. He resigned from the senate. In 1938 he was appointed Arizona State Welfare Commissioner by Governor R. T. Jones, a post which he held until 1950.

Hill died on September 15, 1954, in Good Samaritan Hospital in Phoenix after a long illness. At the time of his death, he was one of only two men to have held the president's role three times.
