= Alfred Kinney =

Arizona politician

Member of the Arizona Senate from the Gila County district
- In office March 1912 – January 1919
- Preceded by: First Senator from Gila County
- Succeeded by: J. Warren Young

Member of the Arizona Senate from the Gila County district
- In office January 1923 – January 1933
- Preceded by: F. A. Woodward
- Succeeded by: John P. Dougherty

Personal details
- Born: 1858 or 1859 Ohio, U.S.
- Died: January 23, 1934 Globe, Arizona
- Party: Democratic
- Occupation: Sawyer, ice distributor

Alfred Kinney was a politician from Arizona. He was one of the first two state senators from Gila County, serving in the first three state legislatures, and the 6th through 10th legislatures, a total of eight legislatures overall.

== Life ==
Kinney was born in Ohio, leaving home at the age of 14 and traveling to Colorado, where he remained for several years, before heading to New Mexico. He stayed there for two years, then made his way to Arizona, where he eventually ended up in Globe, Arizona, where he arrived in 1881. After his arrival in Globe, he initially worked at a sawmill, where he lost an arm. He was married to Clara Kinney. Sometime in late 1888, or early January 1889, Kinney purchased the Globe Soda Water Works. In 1891 Kinney purchased a commercial ice making machine, after which the company was renamed The Globe Ice and Soda Works. In addition, he and his wife operated a rooming house in Globe, called "Kinney House". In 1891, Globe experienced a devastating flood, when Pinal Creek, swollen by two days of torrential rain, overran its banks, destroying many houses and businesses. Kinney's adobe house was one of those lost in the flooding.

By 1900 Kinney had renamed his company the Globe Ice Works. In August 1901, Kinney and several partners transferred the assets of the Globe Ice Works into a new public corporation, The Globe Ice and Cold Storage Company, with Kinney serving as the corporation's president. A month prior, Kinney was also one of the founding officers of the Pinal Paraffine Oil Company. In 1905 he was one of the founding members, serving on the board of directors, of the Radium Mines Company, a mining corporation. He had numerous other mining interests, as did his wife, including the Bryan Group of mines, which was very profitable. He had numerous other mining interests, as did his wife, including the Bryan Group of mines, which was very profitable. In 1907 he was one of the founders of the Globe Consolidated Lighting, Water & Power Company.

While wealthy in his own right, his wife was thought to be the wealthiest woman in Arizona, and one of the top two wealthiest people in the entire state. The two sold their rights on 25 mining claims in the Sleeping Beauty Mountains to the Porphyry Reserve Copper Company in 1930 for $250,000. At the time it was one of the largest deals in mining in Gila County.

In January 1931, Clara Kinney became seriously ill, Senator Kinney travelled back and forth between the hospital in Globe where she was being seen to, and his senatorial duties in Phoenix. She died after several weeks in the hospital on February 6, 1931.

Kinney died suddenly on January 23, 1934, from what was reported as a heart stroke.

== Political career ==
In 1886, Kinney was the Democratic nominee for the supervisor of Gila County. While the other Democrat in the race, W. F. Connors, lost, Kinney was elected to supervisor. In July 1888, citing personal business, Kinney resigned from the Board of Supervisors. In 1898 Kinney was one of two delegates from Gila County to the Arizona territorial Democratic convention.

In 1908 Kinney was the Democratic candidate for mayor of Globe, which he won handily, becoming the first mayor of Globe. Kinney resigned as president of the Pinal Mountain Water Company, due to a conflict of interest with his new mayoral duties. After less than two years in office, Kinney resigned his mayoral seat, over a conflict with the city council regarding city employees' wages. However, Kinney, agreed to rescind his resignation, as long as the council considered passing the ordnance he authored reducing certain city employees' salaries. The town council agreed, and Kinney did not resign.

In September 1910, Kinney was one of five Democratic nominees from Gila County to be the county's delegates to the State Constitutional Convention Arizona State Legislature. Initially it was reported that all five of the Democrats in Gila County, which included future governor, George W. P. Hunt, won the election. However, there was a change after the final tally came in and one Republican, John Langdon, received more votes than three of the Democrats, and he knocked John H. McCormick out as a constitutional delegate. In December 1910 Kinney became one of the forty-one signers of the Arizona Constitution. There were 52 delegates, but 11—10 Republicans and one Democrat—refused to sign.

In 1911, he was one of the first two state senators from Gila County elected to the 1st State Legislature. He wrote a bill, called the Kinney Bill, limiting those working in the mining industry to people who could speak English. This was in response to a large number of Slavonian workers who took their earnings and sent the vast bulk back home to Slavonia, removing those funds from the local economy. He had attempted to have this included in the Arizona Constitution, but had failed to do so. The bill also did not pass in the Senate, so Kinney decided to have it put forth as a public referendum. However, while his petitions gained the requisite number of votes, he failed to get them in to the Secretary of State's office in time for them to be included on the November 1912 ballot.

Kinney was one of the few members of the 1st Legislature to run for re-election in 1914. In a Democratic landslide, he won re-election in November. Of the 54 legislators in both houses of the 1st Legislature, Kinney was one of only six to be re-elected. He was again re-elected in 1916.

He did not run for re-election in 1918, and instead once again became mayor of Globe, when in 1922 he decided to once again run for the state senate. He was nominated at the Democratic convention, and in November, he was once again elected to state senate as a senator from Gila County in the 6th Arizona State Legislature. He served simultaneously as both state senator and mayor of Globe, but was defeated in his attempt at re-election for mayor, when he lost in the Democratic primary 490–425 to D. L. Meloy. Shortly after his defeat in the mayoral Democratic primary, Kinney announced his intention to seek re-election to the state senate in the fall. Kinney easily won the Democratic primary, getting the most votes of all 4 candidates: Kinney - 2,470; John R. Lyons - 2,438; John J. McCullough - 1,463; and George F. Senner - 1,794. In November he was once again sent back to the state senate in the general election.

When queried by former Governor Hunt in June 1926 on whether or not he intended to once again run for re-election, Kinney replied, "I don't want to, but will go if they send me." He once again garnered the most votes in the Democratic primary, and was re-elected for another term in the state senate in November. Kinney announced that he would run again for the state senate in August 1928. Despite a Democratic primary filled with upsets, Kinney was re-nominated to run in the general election, which he also won in November. Kinney again won the Democratic nomination for state senator from Gila County in 1930, and was part of a Democratic landslide in the general election in November. Kinney chose not to run for re-election in 1932.
