= Senator McFarlane =

Senator McFarlane may refer to:

- Arch W. McFarlane (1885–1960), Iowa State Senate
- William D. McFarlane (1894–1980), Texas State Senate

== See also ==
- Senator MacFarlane (disambiguation)
- Duncan McFarlan (died 1816), North Carolina State Senate
