= John L. Sullivan (Arizona politician) =

American politician

7th and 9th Attorney General of Arizona
- In office 1935–1937
- Governor: Benjamin Baker Moeur
- Preceded by: Arthur T. LaPrade
- Succeeded by: Joe Conway
- In office 1944–1948
- Governor: Sidney Preston Osborn
- Preceded by: Joe Conway
- Succeeded by: Evo Anton DeConcini

Personal details
- Born: July 20, 1891 Pennsylvania, U.S.
- Died: October 13, 1949 (aged 58) Phoenix, Arizona, U.S.
- Party: Democratic
- Profession: Attorney

John L. Sullivan (July 20, 1891 – October 13, 1949) was an American lawyer and politician who served as the Attorney General of Arizona from 1935–1937 and from 1944–1948.

== Life and career ==
Sullivan attended Creighton University and graduated from Georgetown University. At Creighton, Sullivan played baseball and later pitched for semi-professional teams.

In 1916, Sullivan began practicing law, but was interrupted by the United States' entry into World War I. After returning from service in France, Sullivan was elected Yavapai County attorney in 1920.

Sullivan was elected Attorney General in 1934. In 1936, he was defeated in the Democratic primary by Joe Conway. After that, he unsuccessfully ran for Arizona's newly created congressional seat, but lost the Democratic nomination to John R. Murdock who went on to win the election in 1942. After Conway's resignation in 1944, Sullivan won another term as Attorney General and was re-elected in 1946. He is the only person to serve non-consecutive terms as attorney general.

Sullivan was involved in attempts to legalize casinos in Arizona and was rumored to have accepted bribes from people who operated gambling houses on Route 66.

In 1936, he married Ethel M. Fisher (1912-2005). They had a daughter, Effie B. Fisher.

After his death in Phoenix in 1949, he was buried there at Saint Francis Cemetery.
