= J. R. McFarland =

American politician from Arizona

Member of the Arizona Senate from the Yavapai County district
- In office January 1929 – December 1932
- Preceded by: Wayne Thornburg
- Succeeded by: Perry McArthur

Personal details
- Party: Democratic
- Profession: Politician

James R. McFarland was an American politician from Arizona. He served two terms in the Arizona Senate during the 9th and 10th Arizona State Legislatures, holding one of the two seats from Yavapai County. In 1928, McFarland ran for one of the two seats from Yavapai County for the Arizona Senate. He received the highest vote count of the three Democrats in the primary, and then he and incumbent A. H. Favour won in November's general election. In 1930 both McFarland and Favour were re-elected. In January 1931, McFarland resigned his post in the State Senate.
