= James A. Harrison =

American politician in Arizona

Member of the Arizona Senate from the Santa Cruz County district
- In office March 1912 – January 1915
- Preceded by: First Senator from Santa Cruz County
- Succeeded by: Harry J. Karns

Member of the Arizona Senate from the Santa Cruz County district
- In office January 1933 – January 1939
- Preceded by: C. C. Crenshaw
- Succeeded by: Harold C. Roesner

Member of the Arizona Senate from the Santa Cruz County district
- In office January 1941 – January 1943
- Preceded by: E. F. Bohlinger
- Succeeded by: W. H. Hathaway

Personal details
- Party: Democratic
- Profession: Politician

James A. Harrison was a politician from Arizona who served in the 1st Arizona State Legislature. He returned to the state senate in 1932 and served four more terms, three consecutively from 1932 through 1938. He operated the large Harrison ranch from the early 1900s through 1950, when he sold it to his son and grandson. He served on the Santa Cruz county board of supervisors from its inception through 1920. He was also on the city council of Nogales, Arizona, and served several terms as its mayor. Early in his life he was a stage coach driver for Wells Fargo.

== Early life ==
Harrison was born in Cloverdale, California on February 12, 1870. His family moved to Casa Grande, Arizona in 1879, but moved on to Tucson and then to Lochiel, Arizona. His father, Richard Harrison, was one of the original trustees of the University of Arizona. The cornerstone of Old Main on the university's campus bears Richard's name. In 1907 he moved to Nogales, Arizona.

== Political career ==
In 1902, he was elected to a four-year term as a Santa Cruz County supervisor. He was the first supervisor elected in Santa Cruz county, and served on the first board of supervisors. In 1906, he was re-elected, and became chairman of the board of supervisors. He remained chairman of the county board of supervisors through 1920. Despite receiving the most number of votes of any candidate during the September primary, he lost in the general election to Republican S. F. Noon.

In 1911, he ran for the state senate seat from Santa Cruz County. He faced Bo J. Whiteside in the Democrat's primary, and after defeating him in the October primary, beat Allen T. Bird in December's general election, becoming the first state senator from Santa Cruz County. He chose not to run for re-election in 1914, leaving the way open for Harry J. Karns to run unopposed for the Democrat's nomination.

In 1916 he was elected to the Nogales town council. In 1918, he was re-elected to the town council, and then was elected Mayor of Nogales. He ran for re-election for Mayor in 1920 and won. He again ran and won re-election for mayor in 1922. He did not run in 1924.

In 1930 he once again ran for the Santa Cruz board of supervisors, but lost to incumbent Fred Hannah.

Two years later, Harrison set his sights on returning to the state senate, and ran in the Democrat primary against incumbent C. C. Crenshaw, beating him decisively. He ran unopposed in the November general election. He was re-elected in 1934, running unopposed in both the primary and general elections. Again in 1936 he ran for re-election. He easily defeated H. C. Roesner in the Democrat primary, and then won against Republican Edward Alvarez in the general election. In 1938 he ran once more for re-election, and again faced off against Roesner in the primary. This time, however, Roesner narrowly defeated Harrison. Following his primary defeat, Harrison announced his retirement from politics. In an interesting twist, Roesner resigned from the senate in January, 1939, shortly after the 14th legislature convened. While Harrison was considered to replace him, the seat was eventually given to former state representative, E. F. Bohlinger. Despite his announcement that he was retiring from politics, Harrison ran again in 1940, defeating Mary Stella Rosenberg in the Democrat primary. In the general election, he easily defeated his Republican opponent, J. A. McGimsey, by a greater than 2–1 margin. He did not run for re-election in 1942.

== Life outside politics ==
Harrison married his wife in Waynesburg, Pennsylvania in 1894, where she was from, and then the two returned to Arizona. She was the granddaughter of Morgan Ringland Wise, a former U.S. Congressman from Pennsylvania, who moved to the Nogales area in Arizona. The couple had one son, Billy, and two Daughters, Virginia and Mary.

He worked as a stagecoach driver for Wells Fargo in the late 1880s, driving a route between Benson and Guymas, Sonora, Mexico. Harrison was a well-known cattleman in southern Arizona, whose ranch, Rancho Bellotal, later known simply as the Harrison Ranch was located near Nogales, Arizona on the Santa Cruz River, and covered 12 square miles. He also owned other ranches, including one near Carbó, in Sonora, Mexico. He operated the Harrison Ranch until 1950, when he turned it over to his son, R. M. Harrison. The ranch remained in the family until it was sold in 1962, shortly before his death. He died on October 12, 1962, in a nursing home in Tucson.

Harrison was the president of The Santa Cruz Valley Bank and Trust Company.

His grandson, also named James A. Harrison, was married to Mary Gillem, the daughter of (then) Lieutenant General Alvan Cullom Gillem Jr.
