= Nellie T. Bush =

Arizona politician, riverboat pilot, airline pilot, activist (1888–1963)

Nellie Trent Bush
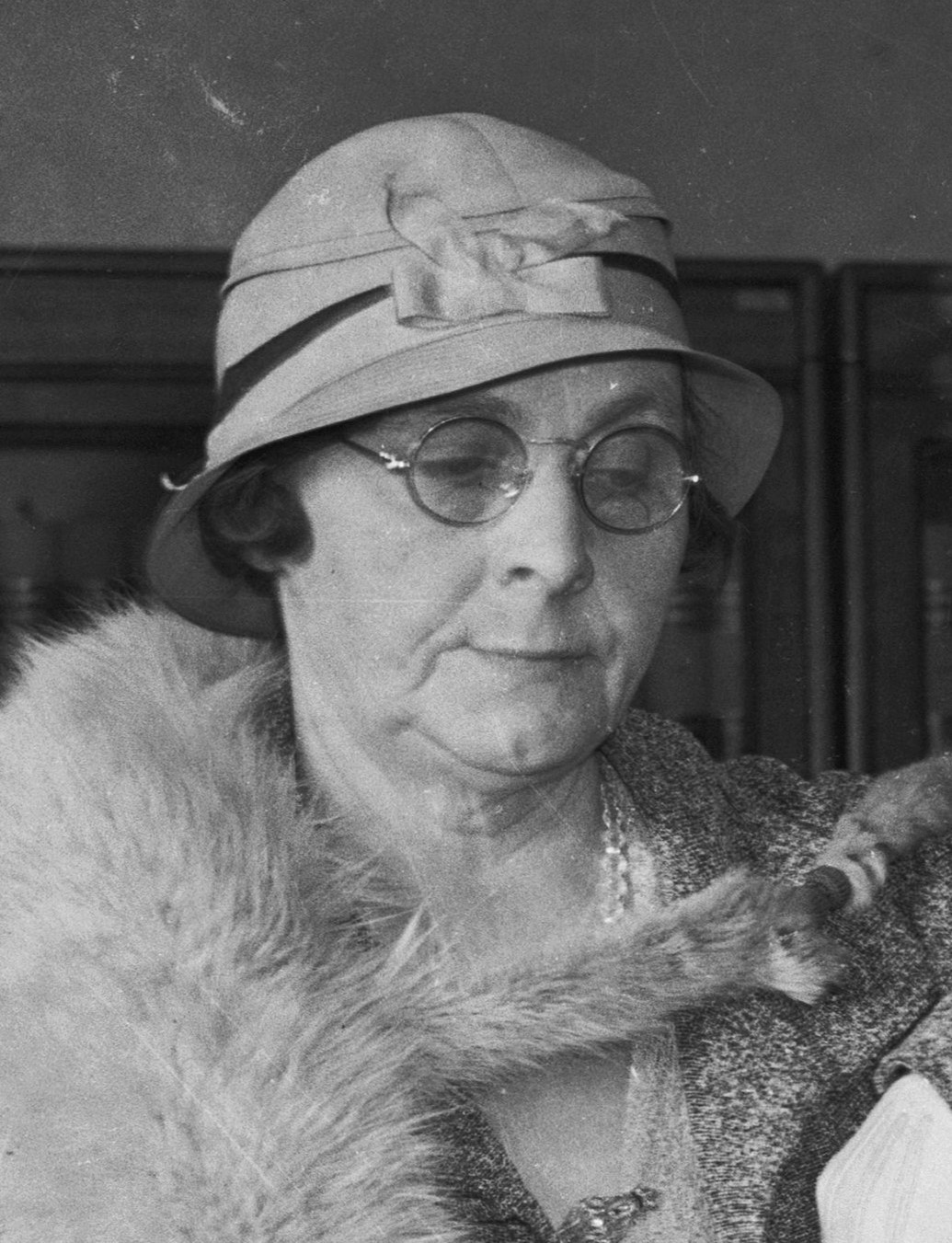
- Bush in 1934

Arizona House of Representatives
- In office 1940–1941

Arizona Senate
- In office 1934–1935

Arizona House of Representatives
- In office 1920–1933

Personal details
- Born: Nellie Trent; November 29, 1888 Cedar County, Missouri, US
- Died: October 27, 1963 (aged 74) Arizona, US
- Party: Democratic Party
- Spouse: Joe Bush
- Children: One
- Education: University of Arizona

Nellie Trent Bush (November 29, 1888 – October 27, 1963) was an Arizona state legislator and the state's first woman judge. In her career, she was first a teacher, then a ferry-boat pilot and street car conductor. She was a business woman, airplane pilot, coroner, school principal, and a leader in Arizona women's clubs. Nellie rose to national fame in 1934 for piloting the National Guard across the Colorado River in her boats, in a political protest over the construction of the Parker Dam.

== Early life and education ==
She was born in 1888 in Cedar County, Missouri to William and Mary Smith Trent. The family moved to the Arizona Territory in 1893 to ease her father's respiratory ailments, which prevented him from being in the work force. They initially settled in Phoenix-adjacent Mesa because of family already residing in the area. Mother and daughter became the sole financial providers. The family lived in a tent in the early years in Arizona. Nellie shelled nuts to buy her clothes when she was in elementary school, where she first met another student named Joseph E. Bush. He would eventually become her husband and business partner.

Determined to get an education, she enrolled in Tempe Normal School (now Arizona State University), financing her education by milking cows, plowing fields, and working in a laundry facility. After earning her teaching license in 1908, she taught in nearby Glendale. She lived in a Glendale hotel room and on weekends took the trolley back home to her parents. Joe Bush was the trolley inspector. During her later years, Arizona journalist Orien W. Fifer wrote about her learning how to drive the city trolley, when she and Joe transported riders during a labor strike. Arizona was granted statehood, becoming the 48th state in the union on February 14, 1912. Their marriage on December 25, 1912, held in the Trent home, was a double wedding, with Nellie's brother Barney marrying Viola Sanders.

== Life in Yuma County ==
The couple established a residence in the Yuma County town of Parker on the Colorado River in 1915. During her lifetime, La Paz County, Arizona did not exist. It was created in 1982 out of Yuma, with Parker then becoming the seat of La Paz.

Their son Wesley was born about three months after they moved there. Joe bought a ferryboat as a business, and a riverboat as their residence. Nellie taught school in Parker, eventually becoming a school principal. She also became the first woman in the United States to hold a riverboat pilot's license. Together they built a successful business transporting cargo and people across the river. The Bush family helped to develop Parker, investing in a hotel and a bank, and building a power plant.

Prior to World War II, both Nellie and her son were licensed to fly airplanes, leading to the purchase of a family plane and their establishment of the first airport in Parker. She was a member of the Arizona Colorado River Water Commission and the Colorado River Basin States Committee. Nellie had helped form the Glendale Women's Club, and helped start the Parker Woman's Club. She was active in both the American Federation of Women's Clubs and the BPW.

== Politics ==
In 1918, Bush began her political career with a successful run for justice of the peace, becoming Arizona's first woman judge, and coroner, for the city of Parker. Two years later, Bush was elected to Arizona's state legislature. According to Orien W. Fifer, her pursuit of a law degree took six years, beginning with an attempt to accomplish it through a correspondence course. She enrolled in the James E. Rogers College of Law in Tucson, enrolling her son Wesley in elementary school there. During at least one summer break, she attended classes at UC Berkeley School of Law.

Nellie successfully ran as a Democrat in 1920 for a seat as a representative in the Arizona state legislature. She passed her bar exam and in 1923 was admitted to the State Bar of Arizona, thereafter becoming a practicing attorney in Yuma County, and city attorney for Parker. Southern Pacific Railroad Company used her as their legal counsel. In 1927, she was the first woman in the legislature to chair the Judiciary committee. That year, she submitted House Bill 50 to create the Arizona Children's Colony to care for children with mental challenges. Governor George W. P. Hunt vetoed the legislation, an action that was met with protest by the state Parent-Teacher Association. The legislature over-rode the veto. When she was president of the American Federation of Women's Clubs, the individual clubs raised $400 to purchase furniture for the colony. For years to come, funding of the colony became a pet cause for women serving in the legislature. Bush served fourteen years as an Arizona representative.

In her 1928 first run for a seat in the state senate, she was defeated in the primary election by Hugo B. Farmer, but was successful when she again ran for the state senate seat in 1934 for a two-year term. In a disagreement with the state of California over permission to build the Parker Dam, Arizona Governor Benjamin Baker Moeur designated Nellie "Admiral of Arizona's Navy" and engaged her boats to transport National Guard troops to protect the state's river rights. The incident propelled her to national fame. At the end of her term in the state senate, Nellie made an unsuccessful run to be Arizona's representative in the United States Congress. In 1940 she was again elected to the state senate, serving one term.

== Later years ==
After her retirement from public office, Nellie continued to be active in women's clubs and local organizations. She died on October 27, 1963.

- She was inducted into the Arizona Women's Hall of Fame in 1982.
- In 2008, she was added to the Women's Plaza of Honor at the University of Arizona.

== Bibliography ==
- Osselaer, Heidi J. (2011). Winning Their Place: Arizona Women in Politics, 1883–1950. University of Arizona Press. ISBN 978-0-8165-3472-2 – via Project MUSE.
