= William Rosenbaum =

American politician (1889–1949)

William George "Rosey" Rosenbaum (December 17, 1889 – January 12, 1949) was an American politician.

Born in Owensboro, Kentucky, Rosenbaum moved to Arizona Territory, in 1911, because of health problems. He worked at a mine mill in Hayden, Arizona and was the foreman and was a pharmacist. He served in the United States Army during World War I. He served in the Arizona House of Representatives from 1927 until his death in 1949. He served as speaker in 1934 and was a member of the Democratic Party. His wife Polly Rosenbaum was appointed to his seat after his death. He died in Phoenix, Arizona.
