= 4th Arizona State Legislature =

1919–1920 session of the Arizona Legislature

←	3rd	5th	→
- Arizona State Capitol (2014)

Overview
- Legislative body: Arizona State Legislature
- Jurisdiction: Arizona, United States
- Term: January 1, 1919 – December 31, 1920

Senate
- Members: 19
- President: A. A. Johns
- Party control: Democrat 14-5

House of Representatives
- Members: 35
- Speaker: A. C. Peterson
- Party control: Democrat 26-9

Sessions
- 1st: January 13 – March 13, 1919

Special sessions
- 1st: February 12 – February 12, 1920

The 4th Arizona State Legislature, consisting of the Arizona State Senate and the Arizona House of Representatives, was constituted from January 1, 1919, to December 31, 1920, during the second term of Thomas Edward Campbell, as Governor of Arizona, in Phoenix. The Democrats maintained their 14–5 majority in the Senate, but the Republicans made gains in the house, reducing the Democrat lead to 26–9.

== Sessions ==
The Legislature met for the regular session at the State Capitol in Phoenix on January 13, 1919; and adjourned on March 13.

A one-day special session was convened on February 12, 1920.

== State Senate ==
=== Members ===
The asterisk (*) denotes members of the previous Legislature who continued in office as members of this Legislature.

County	Senator	Party	Notes
Apache	E. I. Whiting	Republican	
Cochise	T. A. Hughes	Democrat	
Cochise	D. C. O'Neil	Democrat	
Coconino	Hugh E. Campbell*	Democrat	
Gila	W. D. Claypool*	Democrat	
Gila	J. Warren Young	Democrat	
Graham	David H. Claridge*	Democrat	
Greenlee	H. A. Elliott	Democrat	
Maricopa	C. C. Green	Republican	
Maricopa	H. B. Wilkinson*	Republican	
Mohave	C. W. Herndon	Democrat	
Navajo	W. A. Parr	Democrat	
Pima	A. R. Buehman	Republican	
Pima	F. O. Goodell*	Republican	
Pinal	John C. Devine*	Democrat	
Santa Cruz	T. P. Thompson	Democrat	
Yavapai	A. A. Johns	Democrat	
Yavapai	Charles P. Hicks	Democrat	
Yuma	Mulford Winsor*	Democrat	

== House of Representatives ==
=== Members ===
The asterisk (*) denotes members of the previous Legislature who continued in office as members of this Legislature.

County	Representative	Party	Notes
Apache	H. Parley Burk	Republican	
Cochise	Nellie Haywood	Democrat	
Cochise	John P. Cull	Democrat	
Cochise	William Delbridge	Democrat	
Cochise	Charles T. Francis*	Democrat	
Cochise	Harry Jennings	Democrat	
Cochise	Harry T. Sealey	Democrat	
Cochise	J. B. Wylie	Democrat	
Coconino	H. M. Stark	Democrat	
Gila	Rosa McKay	Democrat	
Gila	T. P. Howard	Democrat	
Gila	John H. Lacy	Democrat	
Graham	Joseph H. Lines*	Democrat	
Graham	A. C. Peterson*	Democrat	
Greenlee	Glen L. Coffee*	Democrat	
Greenlee	M. M. Little	Democrat	
Maricopa	G. W. Barrows	Republican	
Maricopa	W. W. Dobson	Republican	
Maricopa	W. J. Galbraith	Republican	
Maricopa	C. W. Lillywhite	Republican	
Maricopa	J. C. Phillips	Republican	
Maricopa	Pauline M. O'Neil*	Democrat	
Mohave	Charles R. Waters	Democrat	
Navajo	J. W. Richards	Democrat	
Pima	M. E. Gibson	Republican	
Pima	Elias Hedrick	Republican	
Pima	F. E. A. Kimball	Republican	
Pinal	J. I. Coleman	Democrat	
Santa Cruz	Wirt G. Bowman	Democrat	
Yavapai	W. J. Flood	Democrat	
Yavapai	M. A. Perkins*	Democrat	
Yavapai	J. W. Sullivan*	Democrat	
Yavapai	Nicholas J. Vyne	Democrat	
Yuma	J. H. Westover	Democrat	
Yuma	A. J. Eddy	Democrat	

== See also ==
- List of Arizona state legislatures
