= 6th Arizona State Legislature =

Session of the Arizona Legislature

←	5th	7th	→
- Arizona State Capitol (2014)

Overview
- Legislative body: Arizona State Legislature
- Jurisdiction: Arizona, United States
- Term: January 1, 1923 – December 31, 1924

Senate
- Members: 19
- President: Mulford Winsor (D)
- Party control: Democratic (18–1)

House of Representatives
- Members: 46
- Speaker: Dan P. Jones (D)
- Party control: Democratic (40–6)

Sessions
- 1st: January 7 – March 10, 1923

The 6th Arizona State Legislature, consisting of the Arizona State Senate and the Arizona House of Representatives, was constituted from January 1, 1923, to December 31, 1924. This period marked the last two years of George W. P. Hunt's fourth tenure as Governor of Arizona, with sessions held in Phoenix.

== Sessions ==
The Legislature met for its regular session at the State Capitol in Phoenix on January 7, 1923, and adjourned on March 10.

There was no special session during this legislature, which would have taken place in 1924.

== State Senate ==
=== Members ===
The asterisk (*) denotes members of the previous Legislature who continued in office as members of this Legislature.

County	Senator	Party	Notes
Apache	Fred Colter	Democratic	
Cochise	W. P. Sims*	Democratic	
Cochise	C. M. Roberts	Democratic	
Coconino	Hugh E. Campbell	Democratic	Died July 13, 1923
Coconino	Fred S. Breen	Republican	Elected in September 1923 in a special election to replace Campbell
Gila	W. D. Claypool*	Democratic	
Gila	Alfred Kinney	Democratic	
Graham	T. S. Kimball	Democratic	
Greenlee	H. A. Elliott*	Democratic	
Maricopa	H. C. Gilbert	Democratic	
Maricopa	J. C. Phillips	Republican	
Mohave	Kean St. Charles	Democratic	
Navajo	Robert L. Moore	Democratic	
Pima	Pat Hayhurst	Democratic	
Pima	Harry A. Drachman	Democratic	
Pinal	Charles E. MacMillin*	Democratic	
Santa Cruz	C. A. Pierce	Democratic	
Yavapai	Charles H. Rutherford	Democratic	
Yavapai	Howard Cornick	Democratic	
Yuma	Mulford Winsor	Democratic	

=== Employees ===
- Secretary: L. S. Williams
- Assistant Secretary: NELLIE A. HAYWARD Nellie A. Hayward
- Sergeant-at-Arms: C. B. Kelton
- Chaplain: Reverend Bertrand R. Cocks
- Doorkeeper: A. F. Banta

== House of Representatives ==
=== Members ===
The asterisk (*) denotes members of the previous Legislature who continued in office as members of this Legislature.

County	Representative	Party	Notes
Apache	John H. Udall	Republican	
Cochise	Howard Barkell	Republican	
Cochise	B. E. Briscoe	Democratic	
Cochise	Arthur Curlee	Democratic	
Cochise	0. S. French	Democratic	
Cochise	A. H. Gardner	Republican	
Cochise	E. A. Watkins	Republican	
Cochise	J. B. Wylie	Democratic	
Coconino	George W. Copeland	Democratic	
Gila	Rosa McKay	Democratic	
Gila	J. Tom Lewis	Democratic	
Gila	M. F. Murphy	Democratic	
Gila	John McCormick	Democratic	
Graham	John F. Weber	Democratic	
Graham	J. M. Smith	Democratic	
Greenlee	J. F. McGrath	Democratic	
Greenlee	M. J. Hannon	Democratic	
Maricopa	M. J. Austin	Democratic	
Maricopa	John R. Bradshaw	Democratic	replaced R. E. Payton, who retired due to ill health
Maricopa	W. J. Burns	Democratic	
Maricopa	Robert L. Finch	Republican	
Maricopa	E. J. Fiock	Democratic	
Maricopa	William Gleason	Democratic	
Maricopa	E. B. Goodwin	Democratic	
Maricopa	Vernettie 0. Ivy	Democratic	
Maricopa	H. C. Ludden	Democratic	
Maricopa	0. C. Ludwig	Democratic	
Maricopa	Freeda Marks	Republican	
Maricopa	Charles Miller	Democratic	
Maricopa	John P. Orme	Democratic	
Maricopa	Dan P. Jones	Democratic	Speaker of the House
Maricopa	R. E. Payton	Democratic	retired due to ill health, replaced by John R. Bradshaw
Mohave	E. Ross Housholder	Democratic	
Navajo	Frank Ellsworth	Democratic	
Pima	A. C. Bernard	Democratic	
Pima	Howard Griffin	Democratic	
Pima	Ralph Gunst	Democratic	
Pima	John W. Mayes	Democratic	
Pinal	A. T. Kilcrease	Democratic	
Pinal	I. D. Rickerson	Democratic	
Santa Cruz	Phil Herold	Democratic	
Yavapai	A. M. Crawford	Democratic	
Yavapai	L. W. Douglas	Democratic	
Yavapai	Albert M. Jones	Democratic	
Yavapai	C. Earl Rogers	Democratic	
Yuma	Nellie T. Bush	Democratic	
Yuma	William Wisener	Democratic	

== See also ==
- List of Arizona state legislatures
