= 3rd Arizona State Legislature =

Session of the Arizona Legislature

←	2nd	4th	→
- Arizona State Capitol (2014)

Overview
- Legislative body: Arizona State Legislature
- Jurisdiction: Arizona, United States
- Term: January 1, 1917 – December 31, 1918

Senate
- Members: 19
- President: David H. Claridge
- Party control: Democrat 14–5

House of Representatives
- Members: 35
- Speaker: A. A. Johns
- Party control: Democrat 31–4

Sessions
- 1st: January 8 – March 8, 1917

Special sessions
- 1st: May 21 – June 19, 1918

The 3rd Arizona State Legislature, consisting of the Arizona State Senate and the Arizona House of Representatives, was constituted from January 1, 1917, to December 31, 1918, during the first term of Thomas Edward Campbell, which was contested, and he left office after serving less than a year (January 1 – December 25, 1917) and the third term of George W. P. Hunt as Governor of Arizona, in Phoenix. The number of senators and representatives remained constant at 19 and 35, respectively. The Republicans made modest gains in both houses, gaining 4 seats in both the Senate and the House, leaving Democrats with a 14–5 majority in the Senate and 31–4 majority in the House.

== Sessions ==
The Legislature met for the regular session at the State Capitol in Phoenix on January 8, 1917; and adjourned on March 8. With the entrance of the United States into World War I, a special session was called to deal with the issues confronting Arizona in the U.S.'s prosecution of the war. It convened May 21, 1918 and lasted until June 19.

== State Senate ==
=== Members ===
The asterisk (*) denotes members of the previous Legislature who continued in office as members of this Legislature.

County	Senator	Party	Notes
Apache	Fred Colter*	Democrat	
Cochise	C. M. Roberts	Democrat	
Cochise	Fred Sutter	Democrat	
Coconino	Hugh E. Campbell*	Democrat	
Gila	Alfred Kinney*	Democrat	
Gila	W. D. Claypool	Democrat	
Graham	David H. Claridge*	Democrat	
Greenlee	W. D. Whipple	Democrat	
Maricopa	Ernest Hall	Republican	
Maricopa	H. B. Wilkinson	Republican	
Mohave	W. P. Mahoney	Democrat	
Navajo	F. O. Mattox	Democrat	
Pima	J. W. Buchanan	Democrat	
Pima	F. O. Goodell	Republican	
Pinal	John C. Devine	Democrat	
Santa Cruz	Ray Ferguson	Republican	
Yavapai	Charles H. Rutherford	Democrat	
Yavapai	Noble H. Getchell	Republican	
Yuma	Mulford Winsor	Democrat	

== House of Representatives ==
=== Members ===
The asterisk (*) denotes members of the previous Legislature who continued in office as members of this Legislature.

County	Representative	Party	Notes
Apache	W. E. Wiltbank	Democrat	
Cochise	William L. Cook*	Democrat	
Cochise	Tom C. Foster	Democrat	
Cochise	Charles T. Francis*	Democrat	
Cochise	T. A. Hughes	Democrat	
Cochise	M. E. Jacks	Democrat	
Cochise	D. C. O'Neil	Democrat	
Cochise	Rosa McKay	Democrat	
Coconino	T. H. Cureton	Republican	
Gila	C. C. Faires	Democrat	
Gila	H. C. Houser	Democrat	
Gila	John McCormick	Democrat	
Graham	Joseph H. Lines*	Democrat	
Graham	A. C. Peterson	Democrat	
Greenlee	Glen L. Coffee	Democrat	
Greenlee	J. F. McGrath	Democrat	
Maricopa	Harold Baxter	Republican	
Maricopa	J. C. Goodwin*	Democrat	
Maricopa	C. C. Green	Republican	
Maricopa	Pauline M. O'Neil	Democrat	
Maricopa	Loren F. Vaughn*	Democrat	
Maricopa	Thomas P. Walton	Democrat	
Mohave	Jasper N. Brewer	Democrat	
Navajo	Osmer D. Flake	Democrat	
Pima	A. R. Buehman	Republican	
Pima	J. P. Mallory	Democrat	
Pima	J. Breck Richardson*	Democrat	
Pinal	C. Howard Davis	Democrat	
Santa Cruz	Theodora Marsh	Democrat	
Yavapai	A. A. Johns*	Democrat	
Yavapai	J. M. Mahoney	Democrat	
Yavapai	M. A. Perkins	Democrat	
Yavapai	J. W. Sullivan	Democrat	
Yuma	A. J. Eddy	Democrat	
Yuma	James L. Edwards*	Democrat	

== See also ==
- List of Arizona state legislatures
