= 5th Arizona State Legislature =

1921–1922 session of the Arizona Legislature

←	4th	6th	→
- Arizona State Capitol (2014)

Overview
- Legislative body: Arizona State Legislature
- Jurisdiction: Arizona, United States
- Term: January 1, 1921 – December 31, 1922

Senate
- Members: 19
- President: H. B. Wilkinson
- Party control: Republican 10-9

House of Representatives
- Members: 39
- Speaker: Paul C. Keefe
- Party control: Democrat 20-19

Sessions
- 1st: January 10 – March 10, 1921

Special sessions
- 1st: February 15 – April 15, 1922

The 5th Arizona State Legislature, consisting of the Arizona State Senate and the Arizona House of Representatives, was constituted from January 1, 1921, to December 31, 1922, during the third term of Thomas Edward Campbell, as Governor of Arizona, in Phoenix. While the Senate remained at 19 members, the size of the House was increased from 35 to 39, with 3 additional representatives added to Maricopa County, and an additional representative for Pinal County. For the first time, the Republicans achieved a majority in one of the houses, the Senate, with a 10–9 edge, while the Democrats were able to barely hold on to their majority in the House, 20–19.

== Sessions ==
The Legislature met for the regular session at the State Capitol in Phoenix on January 10, 1921; and adjourned on March 10.

A special session was convened on February 15, 1922, and was adjourned on April 15.

== Significant legislation ==
One of the most significant pieces was the creation of the Arizona Industrial Commission in 1921. The 5th Legislature made the first attempt to reorganize the state government. At the prompting of Governor Campbell, the Republican-held Senate introduced a bill to establish 8 cabinet level departments: Military Affairs, Finance, Agriculture, Public Welfare, Public Works and Buildings, Reclamation and Irrigation, Education and Registration, and Labor and Industry. It passed along party lines in the Senate, 10–8 (one Democratic Senator was absent), but never made it out of the House committee once it was sent over to the Democrat-held House.

== State Senate ==
=== Members ===
The asterisk (*) denotes members of the previous Legislature who continued in office as members of this Legislature.

County	Senator	Party	Notes
Apache	W. A. Saunders	Republican	
Cochise	W. P. Sims	Democrat	
Cochise	John P. Cull	Democrat	
Coconino	Charles E. Larson	Republican	
Gila	F. A. Woodward	Republican	
Gila	W. D. Claypool*	Democrat	
Graham	Joseph H. Lines	Democrat	
Greenlee	H. A. Elliott*	Democrat	
Maricopa	C. M. Stoddard	Republican	
Maricopa	H. B. Wilkinson*	Republican	
Mohave	James Curtin	Democrat	
Navajo	James Scott	Republican	
Pima	F. O. Goodell*	Republican	
Pima	Elias Hedrick	Republican	
Pinal	Charles E. MacMillin	Democrat	
Santa Cruz	J. L. Schleimer	Democrat	
Yavapai	David Morgan	Republican	
Yavapai	Charles E. Burton	Republican	
Yuma	A. J. Eddy	Democrat	

== House of Representatives ==
=== Members ===
The asterisk (*) denotes members of the previous Legislature who continued in office as members of this Legislature.

County	Representative	Party	Notes
Apache	John H. Udall	Republican	
Cochise	Howard Barkell	Republican	
Cochise	Dana T. Milner	Republican	
Cochise	George H. Cobbe	Democrat	
Cochise	Arthur Curlee	Democrat	
Cochise	Ray B. Krebs	Democrat	
Cochise	J. J. McCullough	Democrat	
Cochise	John B. Wylie*	Democrat	
Coconino	Fred W. Perkins	Republican	
Gila	W. J. Barry	Democrat	
Gila	Curtis L. Night	Democrat	
Gila	Frank L. Perry	Republican	
Graham	J. A. Farrell	Republican	
Graham	D. A. Matthews	Democrat	
Greenlee	J. F. McGrath	Democrat	
Greenlee	T. P. Wilson	Democrat	
Maricopa	W. B. Baxter	Republican	
Maricopa	O. D. Betts	Democrat	
Maricopa	J. Irvin Burk	Democrat	
Maricopa	D. P. Jones	Democrat	
Maricopa	J. H. Kinney	Republican	
Maricopa	J. C. Phillips*	Republican	
Maricopa	C. K. Pishon	Republican	
Maricopa	W. E. Remington	Republican	
Maricopa	O. E. Schupp	Republican	
Mohave	W. A. Neal Jr.	Democrat	
Navajo	Frank Ellsworth	Democrat	
Pima	J. C. Hayes	Republican	
Pima	F. E. A. Kimball*	Republican	
Pima	Herman L. Snyder	Republican	
Pinal	George N. Hall	Republican	
Pinal	Ira D. Wickerson	Democrat	
Santa Cruz	I. P. Frazier	Republican	
Yavapai	Alfred H. Gale	Republican	
Yavapai	Paul C. Keefe	Democrat	
Yavapai	W. Curtis Miller	Democrat	
Yavapai	Elbert A. Stewart	Republican	
Yuma	C. Louise Boehringer	Democrat	
Yuma	Nellie T. Bush	Democrat	

== See also ==
- List of Arizona state legislatures
