= William M. Whipple =

American politician from Arizona

Member of the Arizona House of Representatives from the Greenlee County
- In office March 1912 – December 1914
- Preceded by: George H. Chase
- Succeeded by: H. A. Elliott

Personal details
- Party: Democratic
- Profession: Politician

William M. Whipple was an Arizona politician who served a single term in the Arizona State House of Representatives during the 1st Arizona State Legislature.

He moved to Arizona in 1876. His son, W. D. Whipple, also served in the Arizona State Legislature, as a state senator representing Greenlee County during the 3rd Arizona State Legislature. Whipple died on August 31, 1918.
