= 7th Arizona State Legislature =

Session of the Arizona Legislature

←	6th	8th	→
- Arizona State Capitol (2014)

Overview
- Legislative body: Arizona State Legislature
- Jurisdiction: Arizona, United States
- Term: January 1, 1925 – December 31, 1926

Senate
- Members: 19
- President: Mulford Winsor (D)
- Party control: Democratic (17–2)

House of Representatives
- Members: 47
- Speaker: Charles E. MacMillin (D)
- Party control: Democratic (41–6)

Sessions
- 1st: January 12 – June 14, 1925

The 7th Arizona State Legislature, consisting of the Arizona State Senate and the Arizona House of Representatives, was constituted from January 1, 1925, to December 31, 1926, during the first and second years of George W. P. Hunt's fifth tenure as Governor of Arizona, in Phoenix.

== Sessions ==
The Legislature met for the regular session at the State Capitol in Phoenix on January 12, 1925; and adjourned on June 14.

There was no special session, which would have met during 1926, during this legislature.

== State Senate ==
=== Members ===
The asterisk (*) denotes members of the previous Legislature who continued in office as members of this Legislature.

County	Senator	Party	Notes
Apache	Fred Colter*	Democratic	
Cochise	W. P. Sims*	Democratic	
Cochise	J. B. Wylie	Democratic	
Coconino	Walter Runke	Republican	
Gila	Alfred Kinney*	Democratic	
Gila	John R. Lyons	Democratic	
Graham	Joseph H. Lines	Democratic	
Greenlee	H. A. Elliott*	Democratic	
Maricopa	J. J. Cox	Democratic	
Maricopa	H. A. Davis	Democratic	
Mohave	Kean St. Charles*	Democratic	
Navajo	Robert L. Moore*	Democratic	
Pima	Claude Smith	Democratic	
Pima	T. W. Donnelly	Democratic	
Pinal	A. T. Kilcrease	Democratic	
Santa Cruz	Leslie C. Hardy	Democratic	
Yavapai	A. H. Favour	Democratic	
Yavapai	Wayne Thornburg	Republican	
Yuma	Mulford Winsor*	Democratic	

=== Employees ===
- Secretary: W. J. Graham
- Assistant Secretary: May Belle Craig
- Sergeant-at-Arms: S. F. Langford
- Chaplain: Reverend Victor A. Rule

== House of Representatives ==
=== Members ===
The asterisk (*) denotes members of the previous Legislature who continued in office as members of this Legislature.

County	Representative	Party	Notes
Apache	Jacob Hamblin	Democratic	
Cochise	Clinton W. Moon	Democratic	
Cochise	A. J. Morgan	Democratic	
Cochise	Howard Barkell*	Republican	
Cochise	W. E. Jones	Democratic	
Cochise	Harry E. Pickett	Democratic	
Cochise	Norman Abell	Democratic	
Cochise	B. E. Briscoe*	Democratic	
Coconino	Harry B. Embach	Democratic	
Gila	John McCormick*	Democratic	
Gila	M. F. Murphy*	Democratic	
Gila	James W. Elwin	Democratic	
Gila	J. Knox Kent	Democratic	
Graham	Frank S. Skinner	Democratic	
Graham	J. M. Smith*	Democratic	
Greenlee	J. F. McGrath*	Democratic	
Greenlee	M. J. Hannon *	Democratic	
Maricopa	A. L. Boehmer	Democratic	
Maricopa	J. R. Bradshaw*	Democratic	
Maricopa	Geo. P. Brown	Republican	
Maricopa	R. A. Chestnutt	Democratic	
Maricopa	Robt. L. Finch*	Republican	
Maricopa	E. J. Fiock*	Democratic	
Maricopa	William Gleason*	Democratic	
Maricopa	Ed B. Goodwin*	Democratic	
Maricopa	J. H. Kinney	Republican	
Maricopa	Homer C. Ludden*	Democratic	
Maricopa	W. D. McBrayer	Democratic	
Maricopa	John P. Orme*	Democratic	
Maricopa	F. T. Pomeroy	Democratic	
Maricopa	J. C. Provost	Democratic	
Mohave	E. G. DuBois**	Republican	
Navajo	John A. Freeman	Democratic	
Pima	A. W. Olcott	Democratic	
Pima	Thomas J. Elliott	Democratic	
Pima	J. W. Finn	Democratic	
Pima	J. M. Morgan	Democratic	
Pima	Oliver B. Patton	Democratic	
Pinal	Harry J. Valentine	Democratic	
Pinal	Charles E. MacMillin	Democratic	
Santa Cruz	C. C. Crenshaw	Democratic	
Yavapai	Hilliard T. Brooke	Democratic	
Yavapai	Frank W. Boville	Democratic	
Yavapai	A. M. Crawford*	Democratic	
Yavapai	W. W. Rhodes	Democratic	
Yuma	Freel E. Edwards	Republican	
Yuma	William Wisener*	Democratic	

== See also ==
- List of Arizona state legislatures
