= 8th Arizona State Legislature =

Session of the Arizona Legislature

←	7th	9th	→
- Arizona State Capitol (2014)

Overview
- Legislative body: Arizona State Legislature
- Jurisdiction: Arizona, United States
- Term: January 1, 1927 – December 31, 1928

Senate
- Members: 19
- President: Mulford Winsor (D)
- Party control: Democratic (17–2)

House of Representatives
- Members: 52
- Speaker: A. M. Crawford (D)
- Party control: Democratic (43–9)

Sessions
- 1st: January 10 – April 20, 1927

The 8th Arizona State Legislature, consisting of the Arizona State Senate and the Arizona House of Representatives, was constituted from January 1, 1927, to December 31, 1928, during the first and second years of George W. P. Hunt's sixth tenure as Governor of Arizona, in Phoenix. The number of senators remained constant at 19, while the number of representatives increased from 47 to 52. The Democrats held large majorities in both houses.

== Sessions ==
The Legislature met for the regular session at the State Capitol in Phoenix on January 10, 1927; and adjourned on April 20.

There was six special sessions of this legislature during 1927 and 1928. The first special session took place from January 3-January 8, 1927, before the regular session convened. The second special lasted a single day, March 30, 1927, while the regular session was in recess. The third session was convened on July 25, 1927, and adjourned on August 11, 1927. The fourth special session convened almost immediately following the adjournment of the third special session, on August 11, and went into recess on August 12. It reconvened on October 24, and adjourned on November 5. The fifth special session was convened on November 19, 1928, and adjourned on December 31, at 7:04 pm. The sixth and final session was convened shortly thereafter at 8:30 pm, and adjourned at 3:10 am on January 1, 1929.

== State Senate ==
=== Members ===
The asterisk (*) denotes members of the previous Legislature who continued in office as members of this Legislature.

County	Senator	Party	Notes
Apache	Fred Colter*	Democratic	
Cochise	Fred Sutter	Democratic	
Cochise	J. B. Wylie*	Democratic	
Coconino	Walter Runke*	Republican	
Gila	Alfred Kinney*	Democratic	
Gila	John R. Lyons*	Democratic	
Graham	T. S. Kimball	Democratic	
Greenlee	Harry W. Hill	Democratic	
Maricopa	Dan P. Jones	Democratic	
Maricopa	Harlow Akers	Democratic	
Mohave	Charles Waters	Democratic	
Navajo	G. W. Nelson	Democratic	
Pima	William C. Joyner	Democratic	
Pima	T. W. Donnelly*	Democratic	
Pinal	Thomas N. Wills	Democratic	
Santa Cruz	Andrew Bettwy	Democratic	
Yavapai	A. H. Favour*	Democratic	
Yavapai	Wayne Thornburg*	Republican	
Yuma	Mulford Winsor*	Democratic	

=== Employees ===
- Secretary: Dorothy Burton
- Assistant Secretary: William J. Graham
- Sergeant-at-Arms: Van A. Reichards
- Chaplain: Reverend E. E. Williams
- Doorkeeper: E. J. Fiock

== House of Representatives ==
=== Members ===
The asterisk (*) denotes members of the previous Legislature who continued in office as members of this Legislature. The House grew by five seats from the 7th Legislature: 2 in Maricopa County, and 1 each in Coconino, Navajo, and Pima counties.

County	Representative	Party	Notes
Apache	Jacob Hamblin*	Democratic	
Cochise	W. E. Oxsheer	Democratic	
Cochise	A. J. Morgan*	Democratic	
Cochise	Thomas Cowperthwaite	Democratic	
Cochise	W. E. Jones*	Democratic	
Cochise	Harry E. Pickett*	Democratic	
Cochise	Norman Abell*	Democratic	
Cochise	William Coxon	Democratic	
Coconino	Fred W. Perkins	Republican	
Coconino	Earl C. Slipher	Democratic	
Gila	John McCormick*	Democratic	
Gila	M. F. Murphy*	Democratic	
Gila	William G. Rosenbaum	Democratic	
Gila	J. Knox Kent*	Democratic	
Graham	W. L. Nelson	Republican	
Graham	S. O. Williams*	Democratic	
Greenlee	M. J. Hannon*	Democratic	
Greenlee	Clarence R. Lynch	Democratic	
Maricopa	Elijah Allen	Republican	
Maricopa	M. V. Decker	Democratic	
Maricopa	Robt. L. Finch*	Republican	
Maricopa	M. J. Francis	Democratic	
Maricopa	B. H. Gibbs	Democratic	
Maricopa	Joseph M. Holub	Democratic	
Maricopa	Vernetie O. Ivy	Democratic	
Maricopa	Guy L. Jones	Democratic	
Maricopa	Homer C. Ludden*	Democratic	
Maricopa	R. T. Mahon	Democratic	
Maricopa	W. D. McBrayer*	Democratic	
Maricopa	C. A. McKee	Democratic	
Maricopa	C. Emmett Newton	Democratic	
Maricopa	Fred W. Norton	Democratic	
Maricopa	W. S. Norviel	Republican	
Maricopa	John P. Orme*	Democratic	
Mohave	W. B. Carr	Democratic	
Navajo	S. C. Rogers	Republican	
Navajo	C. G. McQuillan	Republican	
Pima	R.R. Kennedy	Democratic	
Pima	F. E. A. Kimball	Republican	
Pima	John M. Morgan *	Democratic	
Pima	G. T. Old	Democratic	
Pima	Thomas M. Peters	Republican	
Pima	Oliver B. Patton*	Democratic	
Pinal	Fred A. Griffin	Democratic	
Pinal	Charles F. Studley, Jr	Democratic	
Santa Cruz	Gladys Walker	Democratic	
Yavapai	Hilliard T. Brooke*	Democratic	
Yavapai	Frank W. Boville*	Democratic	
Yavapai	A. M. Crawford*	Democratic	
Yavapai	W. W. Rhodes*	Democratic	
Yuma	Nellie T. Bush	Democratic	
Yuma	William Wisener*	Democratic	

=== Employees ===
- Chief Clerk: F.R. Duffy
- Assistant Chief Clerk: Ora Orme
- Sergeant-at-Arms: O.J. Whiteside
- Chaplain: Reverend Seaborn Crutchfield

== See also ==
- List of Arizona state legislatures
