= A. A. Johns =

American politician from Arizona

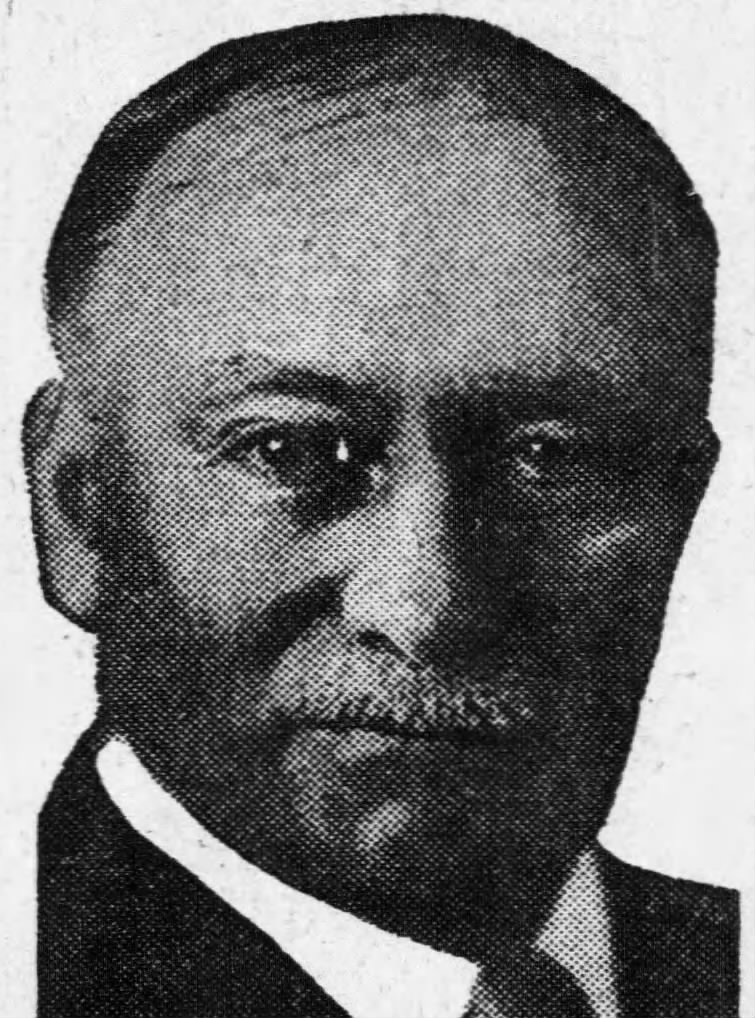
- Johns, ca. 1930

Member of the Arizona Senate from the Yavapai County district
- In office January 1919 – December 1920
- Preceded by: Charles H. Rutherford; Noble H. Getchell
- Succeeded by: David Morgan; Charles E. Burton

Personal details
- Party: Democratic
- Profession: Politician

Anthony A. Johns was an American politician from Arizona. He served a single term in the Arizona State Senate during the 4th Arizona State Legislature, holding one of the two seats from Yavapai County, as well as serving as President of the Senate. He also held one of the seats from Yavapai County in the Arizona House of Representatives three times, in the 2nd, 3rd and 13th Arizona State Legislatures, serving as the Speaker of the House during the 3rd Legislature. He was a long-time resident of Prescott, and one of the largest sheepherders in Yavapai County. Other business interests included mining and construction. Other offices held included a regent for the University of Arizona, chairman of the Arizona Highway Commission, chief of the Prescott Fire Department, president of the Arizona Wool Growers Association, and vice-president of the National Wool Growers Association.

== Early life ==
Johns was born in Cornwall, England on June 10, 1864, and immigrated to the United States as a young man. He first came to Arizona in 1882, and became involved in the mining industry. For several years he traveled around the western U. S. and Canada, in various mining jobs, before returning to Prescott, Arizona, where he became a long-time resident for the rest of his life. In 1892 he married Cora Weaver. Weaver was the first white child born in Prescott, and daughter of B. H. Weaver, one of the first publishers of the Arizona Miner, the first newspaper published in the Arizona Territory. From 1898 through 1902, Johns served as the under-sheriff of Yavapai County.

He was a long time-member of the Prescott Fire Department, serving as its chief beginning in 1900, and remaining in that capacity through 1914. His various business interests included mining. His holdings included interest in the United Eastern Mine. One of his most successful mines was the Silver King Mine. He was one of the largest sheepherders in Yavapai County. He was also one of the principal owners of the Aubrey Investment Company, which was active in various interests, including contracting. As part of the Aubrey Investment Company, Johns was responsible for construction of the first paved road between Nogales and Tucson. He also was responsible for constructing the Silver King Highway in Yavapai County. Johns was heavily involved in the Arizona Wool Growers Association, serving as its president. The association is the oldest continuous group of its kind in the United States. He also served as the vice-president of the National Wool Growers Association. He was active in the Masons, belonging to the Ivanhoe Commandery in Prescott, Arizona. He was also a long-time member of the Elks.

== 1910s - 1920s ==
In 1912, he was chosen as one of five commissioners by newly elected Governor Hunt to oversee Arizona's exhibit at the Panama–Pacific International Exposition in San Francisco. Johns had also served as one of Arizona's commissioners during the St. Louis World's Fair in 1904. In 1914 he was one of ten Democrats running for the four seats from Yavapai County to the Arizona House of Representatives. He finished second in the primary. All four Democrats won in November's general election. In 1916, Johns ran for re-election to the House, facing off against six other Democrats in the primary. He was one of the winners of the primary, and then went on to win in November's general election, returning to the House. Shortly after the election, he was considered one of the favorites to become Speaker of the House, along with T. A. Hughes and Loren F. Vaughn. The final showdown came between Johns and Vaughn, with Johns winning by a 16–15 margin. In 1917, Johns was instrumental in passing a bill apportioning funds so that the state could purchase the historic governor's mansion in Prescott.

In 1918, Johns ran for the Arizona State Senate, instead of the House, winning the Democrat's primary. He was the top vote-getter among state senatorial candidates in the November general election, outdistancing his fellow Democrat Charles P. Hicks by almost 500 votes, 2807–2315. After the election, it became apparent that Johns had the inside track to become the President of the Senate. D. H. Claridge, president of the prior Senate, withdrew from consideration, and Mulford Winsor also took his name out of the race. When the Senate convened in January 1919, Johns was selected President, without opposition. In late 1918, Johns and his partner, Jack Trenberth, attempted to sell their company, the Aubrey Investment Company, and all its assets to the state. Outgoing Governor Hunt approved the deal, but when the new governor, Thomas Campbell, unwound the deal after a negative report from the state engineer, as well as public outcry over Johns' benefitting at the cost of the taxpayers. In September 1920, Trenberth and Johns sued the state for breach of contract. In November the case was adjudicated in favor of Johns and Trenberth. In 1919 and early 1920 there was speculation that Johns would run either for the governorship or the U. S. Senate seat from Arizona in 1920. Johns eventually decided to run for re-election to the Arizona State Senate, along with Hicks. However, both were defeated in the general election in November, by Republicans David Morgan and Charles E. Burton.

In 1921, Johns and several partners formed The Commercial Acceptance Corporation in Tucson. The enterprise was engaged in several different areas, including automobile and truck sales, commercial paper, and real estate. He was also selected as a director to the Arizona Industrial Congress, in charge of their livestock division. In 1924, Johns was chosen as the chairman of the Arizona Democratic Central Committee. In 1925 he was named to the University of Arizona's board of regents by Governor Hunt. He served through the end of 1926. In 1929 a national wool organization was formed to become a centralized sales organization for the wool growers of the U. S. Johns was elected to the first board of directors.

== Later life and death ==
In May 1932, Johns was appointed to the Arizona State Highway Commission by Governor Hunt, to serve through January 31, 1935, to fill the remainder of the term of S. R. Trengove, who had died. Shortly after his appointment, in a hotly contested move, Johns assumed chairmanship of the organization from C. E. Addams. It was thought that Hunt had appointed Johns to ensure that the bulk of the state highway funds would be utilized on the road between Globe and Showlow. The controversial appointment led to Hunt being defeated in the Democrat's primary later in 1932. In January 1933 a political showdown occurred when Governor Moeur, who had defeated Hunt in the primary, refused to recognize Johns' appointment, and appointed his own member of the commission, Ray Vyne. There was split regarding whether or not Hunt's appointment carried over into a new administration, or only until a new legislature went into session. The latter opinion was endorsed by state attorney general Arthur T. LaPrade, and when the legislature was seated in January 1933, they approved Moeur's appointment. In July 1935 Johns was arrested for drunk driving, while traveling on the Phoenix-Wickenburg highway. He was convicted and served a 30-day sentence in jail.

In 1936 Johns decided to once again run for the state legislature, this time for the House of Representatives. He defeated Tom Smith in the primary, and went on to win the general election in November. During the session of the legislature, Johns developed rheumatic fever, and was seriously ill for several months. The illness led him to refuse to run for a fifteenth consecutive term as president of the Arizona Wool Growers Association, when the group met in July. At the meeting, the group named him honorary president for life. He ran for renomination for the House seat in 1938, but was defeated in the primary by Robert E. Perkins. He ran again in 1940 and 1942 for the House seat, losing both times in the primary to Perkins. In 1943, Johns was one of the eight pall-bearers for Sharlot M. Hall.

Johns died on May 24, 1944, in Prescott.
