= Senator Whipple =

Senator Whipple may refer to:

- Mary Margaret Whipple (born 1940), Virginia State Senate
- W. D. Whipple (fl. 1910s), Arizona State Senate
