= Charles P. Hicks =

American politician from Arizona

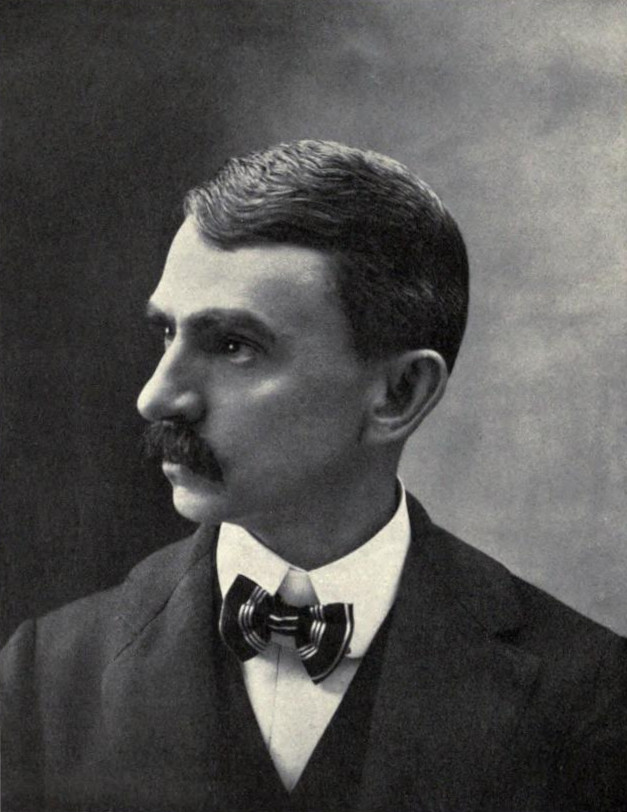

Member of the Arizona Senate from the Yavapai County district
- In office January 1919 – December 1920
- Preceded by: Charles H. Rutherford; Noble H. Getchell
- Succeeded by: David Morgan; Charles E. Burton

Personal details
- Born: June 25, 1858 Fayette, Missouri
- Died: December 24, 1929 (aged 71) Prescott, Arizona
- Party: Democratic
- Profession: Politician

Charles Payne Hicks (June 25, 1858 – December 24, 1929) was an American politician from Arizona. He served a single term in the Arizona State Senate during the 4th Arizona State Legislature, holding one of the two seats from Yavapai County.

== Biography ==
Hicks was born in 1858 in Fayette, Missouri. He relocated to Arizona in 1879, settling in Prescott. In 1889, Hicks was elected city assessor in Prescott, Arizona. In 1894 he was selected by the Democrats to run for probate judge in Yavapai County, and was elected in the general election in November. In 1896, Hicks was again selected by the Democrats to run for probate judge, this time by acclamation. He won easily in the general election. The Democrats once again chose Hicks for their probate judge candidate in 1898, and he won in a landslide in November's general election. During the 1890s Hicks also served as the county superintendent of schools for Yavapai County. Hicks was also involved in the mining industry.

In February 1898, Hicks and his wife adopted a young 8 month old child, known as Baby Bell, and named her Violet Hicks. The child had been abandoned by her parents the week before by being dropped off on the bar of the Cabinet Saloon in Prescott, with a note. Judge Hicks took the child home, and immediately began the process to adopt her. The couple had another child, Myrtle. In February 1900, Hicks' wife became quite ill with dual bout of rheumatism and pneumonia. She died after a brief illness. The Democrats renominated Hicks for probate judge in 1900, and won re-election in November. Hicks was nominated by the Democrats again in 1902 and 1904, winning both general elections. This was followed by nominations from the Democrats in 1906, 1908, and 1910 with Hicks winning all three elections again.

When Arizona achieved statehood in 1912, the state constitution eliminated the probate court, with all matters pertaining thereto handled by the Arizona Superior Court. With the abolishment of the probate court, in February 1912 Hicks was appointed the deputy clerk of the Superior Court, handling all functions he previously did as a probate judge. He held the position until August of that year, when he resigned. Hicks served as the secretary of the state senate during the 3rd Arizona State Legislature. In 1918, the Democrats nominated Hicks, along with A. A. Johns, for the two seats in the Arizona State Senate from Yavapai County. Both Hicks and Johns won in the November general election, defeating Republican Charles Mullen and Socialist A. J. Eberwine. Hicks and Johns ran for re-election to the Arizona State Senate in 1920. However, both were defeated in the general election in November, by Republicans David Morgan and Charles E. Burton.

In 1923 Hicks remarried, this time to Mrs. Laura Rogers, widow of Colonel Rogers. The wedding took place on November 3, 1923, in the Supreme Court of Arizona. It was the first wedding ceremony to take place there. Hicks died in his home in Prescott on December 24, 1929, from pneumonia, after a short illness.
