= Senator Waters =

Senator Waters may refer to:

- Charles Emerson Waters (1910–1979), Georgia State Senate
- Charles R. Waters (died 1933), Arizona State Senate
- Larissa Waters (born 1977), Senate of Australia
- Stanley Waters (1920–1991), Senate of Canada

== See also ==
- David H. Watters (born 1950), New Hampshire State Senate
