= David Morgan (Arizona politician) =

American politician from Arizona (1866–1930)

Member of the Arizona Senate from the Yavapai County district
- In office January 1921 – December 1922
- Preceded by: A. A. Johns; Charles P. Hicks
- Succeeded by: Charles H. Rutherford; Howard Cornick

Member of the Arizona Territory House of Representatives from the Yavapai County district
- In office 1907–1908

Personal details
- Born: 1866 Wales
- Died: January 11, 1930 (aged 63–64) Los Angeles, California
- Party: Republican
- Spouse: Etta
- Children: Victoria
- Profession: Politician, mining engineer

David Morgan was an American politician from Arizona. He served a single term in the Arizona State Senate during the 5th Arizona State Legislature, holding one of the two seats from Yavapai County.

== Biography ==
Morgan was born in Wales in 1866. He immigrated to the United States in 1883. Upon his arrival in States, he briefly went to work in the coal mines in Pennsylvania, before heading further west, working in several different states, before ending up in Arizona. Morgan was married to Etta Morgan. The couple had one daughter, Virginia. Morgan lived in Jerome, Arizona.

By 1900, Morgan was involved in the mining industry in Yuma County, Arizona. In 1901 he had moved north, into Yavapai County, where he and a partner discovered the Lucky Dave mine. In 1902 he was the foreman of the Congress Mine, as well as working his own mining claims. It was discovered several years later that in 1902 Morgan was one of three mining officials targeted in a murder plot by union organizers at the Congress Mine. However, the plot was exposed prior to it being carried out, and the conspirators fled the jurisdiction. In 1904 he left the Congress mine, and became the foreman of the Imperial Mine.

In 1906 he was one of the three Republicans elected to the Arizona Territorial Legislature as members of the Arizona House of Representatives. However, after his election, due to work considerations, Morgan did not feel that he could execute his duties as a representative and tendered his resignation prior to the legislature convening in January 1907. Republican leaders asked him to reconsider, and he rescinded his resignation and joined the legislative body in February 1907. In 1911, Morgan left his position at the Imperial mine. He next went to work for the United Verde Extension Company, and while working for them was credited for the discovery of the large copper ore vein which made it the "biggest body of high grade copper ore in the world." In 1917, Morgan moved on from the United Verde Extension to become the manager of the Verde Combination Mining Company.

In 1920, he and Charles E. Burton ran unopposed in the Republican primary for the two Arizona State Senate seats from Yavapai County. Morgan and Burton easily defeated their Democrat opponents, incumbents A. A. Johns and Charles P. Hicks, in the November general election. During the election, Morgan was traveling through Europe. After his election to the Senate, his candidacy was called into question, since, being in Europe, he did not sign his nominating certificate. By 1925, Morgan have moved from Jerome to Los Angeles, California. In California, he worked as a consultant geologist. Morgan died on January 11, 1930, in the Good Samaritan Hospital in Los Angeles, California. While he had been in ill health for some time, his death was unexpected. At the time of his death he was the vice-president and general manager of the Zenda Gold Mining Company, near Barstow. He was a resident of Huntington Park.
