= Senator Curtin =

Senator Curtin may refer to:

- James E. Curtin (fl. 1920s), Arizona State Senate
- John Curtin (American politician) (1867–1925), California State Senate
