= James Curtin =

James Curtin may refer to:

- James E. Curtin, Arizona politician, state senator
- James Curtin, birth name of Drake Maverick, professional wrestler
