= Kean St. Charles =

American politician from Arizona

Member of the Arizona Senate from the Mohave County district
- In office January 1923 – December 1926
- Preceded by: James E. Curtin
- Succeeded by: Charles Waters
- In office January 1929 – December 1930
- Preceded by: Charles Waters
- Succeeded by: J. Hubert Smith
- In office January 1933 – January 1934
- Preceded by: J. Hubert Smith
- Succeeded by: J. Hubert Smith

Personal details
- Party: Democratic
- Profession: Politician

Kean St. Charles was an American politician from Arizona. He served several terms in the Arizona State Senate during the 6th, 7th Arizona State Legislatures, 9th Arizona State Legislature, and 11th Arizona State Legislatures holding the seat from Mohave County. He also served in Arizona House of Representatives during the 21st and 22nd Arizona Territorial Legislatures. He also served in the upper house of the Territorial Legislature, called the council, during the last session before statehood.

St. Charles was born in Virginia in 1855. He moved to Arizona in 1893, where he had a brief stint on the newspaper, Mohave County Miner, before becoming one of the founders of Our Mineral Wealth, a weekly newspaper in Kingman, Arizona.

St. Charles was also involved in Arizona's mining industry, and discovered several valuable mineral properties. He died on September 4, 1945, at his daughter's home in Long Beach, California.
