= Charles Larson =

Charles Larson may refer to:

- Charles R. Larson (1936–2014), U.S. Navy admiral and candidate for lieutenant governor of Maryland
- Charles R. Larson (scholar) (1938–2021), American scholar of African literature
- Charles Larson (producer) (1922–2006), television producer
- Charles E. Larson, American politician from Arizona
- Chuck Larson (born 1968), former Iowa state senator
- Chuck Larson, co-founder of Rock River Arms
