= Charles E. Burton (politician) =

American politician from Arizona

Member of the Arizona Senate from the Yavapai County district
- In office January 1921 – December 1922
- Preceded by: A. A. Johns; Charles P. Hicks
- Succeeded by: Charles H. Rutherford; Howard Cornick

Personal details
- Party: Republican
- Profession: Politician

Charles E. Burton was an American politician from Arizona. He served a single term in the Arizona State Senate during the 5th Arizona State Legislature, holding one of the two seats from Yavapai County.

== Biography ==
Burton was born in Texas in 1883, and moved to Arizona Territory in 1903, settling in Ash Fork, where he opened the Northern Arizona Commercial Company. He was a major sheep rancher in northern Arizona, centered in Ash Fork, with significant holdings. Burton married Ada Brown of Prescott on May 3, 1909, in Phoenix. Ada was an accomplished musician, and had studied music in both Phoenix and Los Angeles. In 1912, Burton sold many of his range interests north of Ash Fork, and extended his ranching activities to include cattle.

In 1914, he ran for the Republican nomination for one of the seats from Yavapai County to the Arizona House of Representatives. He was unopposed in the Republican primary, but all four Republican candidates lost to their Democrat opponents in the general election. By 1915 he was one of the largest sheep ranchers in Arizona. In February 1917 Ada Burton died in Phoenix after a short illness. Later that same year, Burton was ill for several weeks with typhoid fever.

In 1918, after his election, Governor Campbell appointed Burton as one of the three members of the state's Sheep Sanitary Board. In 1920, Burton ran for the Republican nomination for the state senate from Yavapai County. The two Democrat incumbents, A. A. Johns and Charles P. Hicks were both soundly beaten by Burton and his Republican running partner, David Morgan.

In addition to his sheep ranching activities, Burton was also co-owner of the Northern Arizona Commercial Company, a mercantile enterprise. He also owned the Arizona Motor Company, a motor sales company handling several lines of trucks and cars in Arizona and Sonora, Mexico. By 1921 his other business interests included being a director in the Phoenix National Life Insurance Company, part owner in the Imperial Live Stock and Mortgage Company, and the Sigler Oil Company, which operated oil fields in Texas. In addition he was a major stockholder of the Arizona Packing Company, and was one of the wealthiest men in Arizona.

In May 1921 Burton married for a second time, to Mabel Frankforter of Phoenix, and member of a well-known Arizona pioneering family. The wedding took place in Los Angeles. In 1922 the Burtons purchased a home on north Central Avenue in Phoenix. They split their time between Phoenix and Williams. Burton did not run for re-election in 1922. At some point between 1927 and 1928, Burton and Mabel divorced, and Burton remarried for a third time, to Susan, a native of Helsinki, Finland. They remained married until her death in November 1948. The couple had two children, Robert and Linda. Burton died on March 15, 1959, in Phoenix.
