= David H. Claridge =

American politician in Arizona

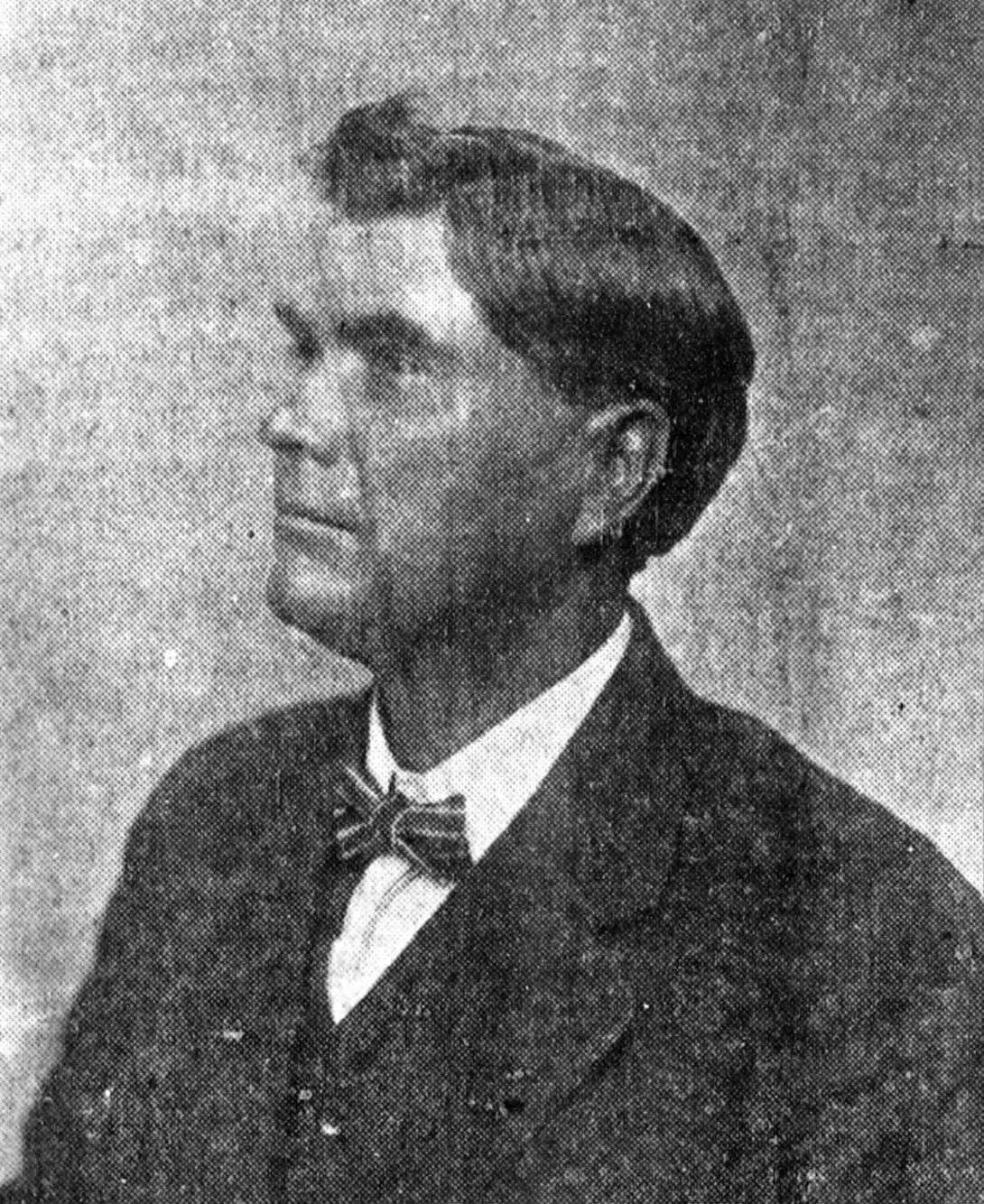
- Claridge in 1916

Member of the Arizona Senate from the Graham County district
- In office January 1915 – January 1921
- Preceded by: William W. Pace
- Succeeded by: Joseph H. Lines

Personal details
- Born: June 30, 1873 Mt. Carmel, Utah, U.S.
- Died: June 14, 1945 (aged 71) Phoenix, Arizona
- Party: Democratic
- Spouse: Effie
- Children: 11, 7 daughters and 4 sones

David Harmon Claridge was a politician from Arizona who served in the Arizona Senate for several terms. He was also a rancher, a farmer, and an Arizona pioneer. In the 1920s he stopped ranching and moved to Phoenix, where he became involved in the real estate business.

== Personal life ==
Claridge was born on June 30, 1873, in Mt. Carmel, Utah. In 1883 he traveled with his parents to live in Arizona, and they settled in Thatcher. When he moved out of his parents' house, he settled in Solomonville, Arizona (now called Solomon), where he was a rancher and a farmer. Claridge married Effie R. Nelson, originally of Bear Lake, Idaho, on December 29, 1892. The couple had eleven children, seven daughters and four sons.

In 1902 he became the bishop of the Bryce Ward of the LDS.

In November 1918, Claridge sold his 150-acre (61 ha) ranch, located east of Solomonville. Having sold his ranch, he moved to Phoenix in late 1919. In 1920 he opened a realty company in Phoenix, specializing in farmland, originally called Claridge and Campbell Realty Company, but was quickly renamed D. H. Claridge Realty Company. 1920 also saw him join the board of directors of The National Bank of Arizona.

He became ill in November 1944, and spent several months battling the illness before being admitted to the hospital in late May 1945. He died three weeks later at the hospital in Phoenix on June 14, 1945, just short of his 72nd birthday.

== Political career ==
He became the county recorder for Graham County in 1908, and was re-elected by an overwhelming majority in 1911. In May 1914, Claridge announced he would run for the state senator seat from Graham County. He won the Democratic primary over A. E. Jacobson by an overwhelming majority, 1,013 to 248, and he followed that up with a landslide victory over Socialist Party's candidate, Lorenzo Watson, 1,637 to 240.

In 1916 he ran for re-election for the state senate, and was unopposed in both the primary and general election. Going into the 3rd Arizona State Legislature, he was one of several candidates being spoken of to become the next president of the senate, representing the conservative wing of the Democratic Party. The other four senators vying for the presidency were Mulford Winsor, Fred Sutter, Charles H. Rutherford, and Charles M. Roberts. The Democratic caucus voted 8-6 for Claridge over Mulford, and he was elected the next senate president. In 1918, he announced his candidacy for the Arizona State Tax Commission. However, in June the election was contested in court, due to a question of the length of the terms of the existing commissioners. A judge granted the injunction to stop the election in November. Since there was to be no election for state tax commissioner, Claridge announced his intention to run for re-election to the senate. He again ran unopposed in both the primary and the general election, returning to the senate for a third consecutive term. He was considered a strong candidate to repeat as the president of the senate, however political considerations led to him withdrawing from the race. When he announced he was going to run for state tax commissioner, Joseph H. Lines and A. C. Peterson, both members of the state house of representatives, had announced their intention to run for his vacant seat in the senate. However, when the commissioner position was not to be contested, both Lines and Peterson withdrew from senate race to clear the way for Claridge. The ran for re-election in the house, and both won. As the 4th Arizona State Legislature was being organized in January 1919, both were considered the front runners for the speakership of the house. It was not considered that the leaders from both the house and the senate be from the same county, so Claridge withdrew his name from contention, so as to not interfere with either Lines or Peterson gaining the speakership, which eventually went to Lines.
