= Charles Rutherford =

Charles Rutherford may refer to:

- Charles H. Rutherford, Arizona state senator
- Charles Smith Rutherford (1892–1989), Canadian soldier, recipient of Victoria Cross
