= C. W. Herndon =

American politician from Arizona

Member of the Arizona Senate from the Mohave County district
- In office January 1919 – December 1920
- Preceded by: W. P. Mahoney
- Succeeded by: James Curtin

Personal details
- Party: Democratic
- Profession: Politician

Charles W. Herndon was an American lawyer and politician from Arizona. He served a single term in the Arizona House of Representatives during the 4th Arizona State Legislature.

== Biography ==
Charles W. Herndon was born in 1877, the son of John C. Herndon, a prominent Prescott attorney, and Florence M. Wilson. The family moved to Prescott in 1883. When John Frank Wilson took over his role as the territorial delegate to the Fifty-sixth Congress in 1899, Herndon accompanied him as his private secretary.

In 1910, he moved his law practice from Prescott to Kingman. In 1911, Herndon ran to become the attorney for Mohave County, winning in the general election in December, in which he ran unopposed. In 1914, he ran for re-election, defeating S. D. Stewart in the Democrat's primary, and then easily defeating Republican Ross S. Blakely in the general election in November. In August 1916, Herndon resigned as county attorney. From 1915 through 1917 Herndon was part of several groups which incorporated mining entities in Arizona. Those entities included the Arizona-Cerbat Mines Company, Victor Copper Company, Red Gap Gold Mines Company, Oatman Standard Mines Company, and Arizona C. O. D. Mines Company.

In August 1918, Herndon announced his intention to run for the Arizona State Senate seat from Mohave County. In a hotly contested primary, Herndon beat out four other Democrats for the nomination, and then won November's general election. In 1918 and 1919 Herndon was part of the formation of three companies in Arizona, two mining and one oil development: the Arizona-Brunswick Mining Company, the Chloride Tunnel Company, and the Community Oil Company. He ran for re-election in 1920, but lost in the Democrat's primary in September to James Curtin. From 1920 through 1927 he was involved in the creation of numerous other companies in Arizona, Nevada, and California, including the Silver Trails Mining Company (AZ-1920), which operated the Diamond Joe Mine in Mohave County, the Sickels Silver Mining Company (AZ-1920), the White Hills Mining Company (AZ-1921), the Cedar Mines Consolidated company (AZ-1921), the River Range Mining Company (AZ-1921), the Arizona-Rand Mine, Inc. (AZ-1921), the Anna Jane Mining Company (AZ-1921), the Signal Mines Company (NV-1922), the Stoney Leasing and Mining Company (AZ-1922), the Arizona Highlander Mining Company (AZ-1925), and the Filimore Mining Company (CA-1927). Herndon died on July 25, 1927, in his mother's home in Prescott, Arizona, after being ill for several months.
