= Wayne Thornburg =

American politician

Member of the Arizona Senate from the Yavapai County district
- In office January 1925 – December 1928
- Preceded by: Charles H. Rutherford; Howard Cornick
- Succeeded by: J. R. McFarland

Personal details
- Born: 1891
- Died: August 8, 1980 (aged 88–89)
- Party: Republican
- Profession: Politician

Wayne Thornburg was an American politician from Arizona. He served two consecutive terms in the Arizona State Senate during the 7th and 8th Arizona State Legislatures, holding one of the two seats from Yavapai County. He was a cattle rancher and agriculturist near Phoenix, who at one point was the largest producer of sugar beet seed in the world.

== Biography ==
Thornburg was born in 1891 in California. He moved from Van Nuys, California, to Arizona in 1919, originally locating in the Prescott area, where he managed several ranches: the Bixby ranch, the Diamond 2 Cattle Ranch, and the Three Links Cattle Ranch. In 1918, upon U. S. entrance into World War I, Thornburg enlisted in the U. S. Coast Guard. In October of that year, he attended their officer training program at Fort Monroe in Virginia. He graduated and was given the rank of Lieutenant. He was honorably discharged in February 1919. He moved from the Prescott area to Phoenix in 1927.

He was chairman of the public lands committee which was the driving force behind getting the Taylor Grazing Act of 1934 passed into law. He pioneered the growing of both cardinal grapes and winter sweet corn in the Salt River Valley, and his ranch in Litchfield Park was one of the largest producers of cardinal grapes in the country. At one point, he and his partner, Floyd Smith were the largest producers of sugar beet seed in the world. He also developed and patented a variety of grape, the "robin grape". In addition to his grapes, he also grew cotton and alfalfa, as well as raising cattle. Thornburg died on August 8, 1980, in the Beatitudes Care Center in Glendale.
