= Thomas S. Kimball =

American politician from Arizona

Member of the Arizona Senate from the Graham County district
- In office January 1923 – December 1924
- Preceded by: Joseph H. Lines
- Succeeded by: Joseph H. Lines
- In office January 1927 – December 1930
- Preceded by: Joseph H. Lines
- Succeeded by: W. B. Kelly

Personal details
- Born: 1862 Salt Lake City, Utah
- Died: October 29, 1939 (aged 76–77) Thatcher, Arizona
- Party: Democratic
- Spouse: Frances Ada Williams
- Profession: Politician

Thomas S. Kimball was an American politician from Arizona. He served three terms in the Arizona State Senate during the 6th, 8th, and 9th Arizona State Legislatures, holding the seat from Graham County. He was heavily involved in the Church of Jesus Christ of Latter-day Saints (LDS Church). During his life he was involved in freighting, ranching and mining.

== Biography ==
Kimball was born in 1862 in Salt Lake City, Utah. His parents were David Patten Kimball and his wife Caronline, and his grandfather was Heber C. Kimball. He moved to Hackberry, Arizona with his parents and family in 1877. The family moved to the San Pedro Valley, where his family helped found St. David, Arizona, named after his father. In his early years he worked as a freighter, first for the government, then for other private companies. In 1882, Kimball moved to Thatcher, where he lived the remainder of his life. In Thatcher, he engaged in farming, and was the first man to bring a steam thresher into the valley in 1914. He was married to Frances Ada Williams on October 15, 1883. He was very active in the LDS Church. Kimball was also heavily involved in the mining industry.

In 1914, he ran unsuccessfully for the Graham County Board of Supervisors. In 1922, when incumbent Joseph H. Lines did not run for re-election, Kimball ran unopposed in the Democrat primary for the Arizona State Senate seat from Graham County, and then defeated Republican J. A. Farrell in the general election. In 1924 he ran for re-election, facing off against the former state senator, Joseph H. Lines, who he had replaced in the legislature in 1923. Lines narrowly defeated Kimball in the Democrat's primary by 18 votes. Kimball ran for the State Senate again in 1926. He was unopposed in the primary, and then defeated Republican Ed Claridge in November's general election.

Kimball was one of the members of the Arizona Colorado River Commission. In 1928, Kimball ran for re-election to the state and won. He ran for re-election again in 1930, but was defeated by W. B. Kelly, the editor of the Graham Guardian, in the Democrat primary in September. In 1934, with incumbent W. B. Kelly choosing not to run for re-election when he ran for state Secretary of State, Kimball once again ran for the State Senate seat from Graham County. He was defeated in a three-way race in the Democrat primary by Aaron Nelson. In October 1939, while visiting his daughter in Sonora, Mexico, Kimball fell ill. He returned to his home in Thatcher. On October 28, he suffered a stroke and lapsed into unconsciousness, and died the next day at his home.
