= A. H. Favour =

American politician

Alpheus H. Favour

Member of the Arizona Senate from the Yavapai County district
- In office January 1925 – December 1932
- Preceded by: Charles H. Rutherford; Howard Cornick
- Succeeded by: Perry McArthur

Personal details
- Born: 1880
- Died: December 30, 1939 (aged 58–59) Rochester, New York, US
- Party: Democratic
- Spouse: Eva
- Children: Alpheus L., John, Catharine, and Mary
- Profession: Politician

Alpheus H. Favour (1880 – December 30, 1939) was an American politician from Arizona. He served a four consecutive terms in the Arizona State Senate during the 7th through the 10th Arizona State Legislatures, holding one of the two seats from Yavapai County.

== Biography ==
Favour was born in 1880. He was the vice-president of the Bank of Arizona. He was married to Eva Favour, and they had four children: Alpheus L., John, Catharine, and Mary. In 1936, he wrote the definitive biography of the famous mountain man, Old Bill Williams, entitled, Old Bill Williams: Mountain Man. In late November 1939, Favour went to the Mayo Clinic for treatment and observation. While there, he developed streptococcus, which got progressively worse and resulted in his death on December 30, 1939, at a hospital in Rochester, New York.
