= Joseph H. Lines =

American politician (1870–1961)

Member of the Arizona Senate from the Graham County district
- In office January 1921 – December 1922
- Preceded by: David H. Claridge
- Succeeded by: Thomas S. Kimball
- In office January 1925 – December 1926
- Preceded by: Thomas S. Kimball
- Succeeded by: Thomas S. Kimball

Member of the Arizona House of Representatives from the Graham County district
- In office January 1915 – December 1920
- In office January 1931 – December 1932

Personal details
- Born: October 24, 1870 Goshen, Utah
- Died: September 21, 1961 (aged 90) Mesa, Arizona
- Party: Democratic
- Spouse: Sarah Ferrin
- Children: Freda Elizabeth, Charles Henry, Rowena, Laverna, Lavona, Walter, Milo, Alice, Claud, and Della
- Profession: Politician, businessman

Joseph H. Lines was an American politician from Arizona. He served a single term in the Arizona State Senate during the 5th Arizona State Legislature, holding the single seat from Graham County.

== Biography ==
Lines was born in Goshen, Utah on October 24, 1870, to parents who had immigrated from England. Lines moved to Pima, Arizona in 1881 with his family. He married Sarah Ferrin on October 6, 1891, in Thatcher, Arizona. They had 13 children, 10 of whom lived to adulthood: Freda Elizabeth, Charles Henry, Rowena, Laverna, Lavona, Walter, Milo, Alice, Claud, and Della. By 1901 Lines was living on his ranch south of Pima, where he served as justice of the peace from 1895 through 1904. He and his brothers operated a mercantile business called Lines Bros., of which Lines was the manager.

In June 1914, Lines announced his intention to run in the Democrat's primary for one of the two seats from Graham County to the Arizona House of Representatives. He and his running mate, J. D. Lee ran unopposed in the primary, and both won in the general election in November. In 1916 he ran for re-election to the House, this time with A. C. Peterson as his running mate. The two ran unopposed in the primary, and easily defeated their Republican opponents in November's general election. In 1918 both Lines and Peterson ran for re-election, and were unopposed in both the primary and the general election. When the 4th Arizona State Legislature was organized in January 1919, both Lines and Peterson were competing for the Speakership of the House. Lines took his name out of contention, and Peterson was named Speaker.

In July 1920 Lines decided not to run for re-election, instead choosing to run for the sole seat from Graham County in the Arizona State Senate. He easily won election, having no opposition in either the Democrat primary, or the general election in November. He did not run for re-election in 1922. In 1924 he ran for the state senate again, facing off against the incumbent Thomas S. Kimball, who had replaced Lines in the 6th Arizona State Legislature. Lines narrowly defeated Kimball in the Democrat's primary by 18 votes. He then ran unopposed in the November general election. He did not run for re-election in 1926, leaving Kimball to run unopposed. However, the two did face off in the 1928 Democrat primary once again, this time with Kimball walking away victorious. In 1930, Lines once again ran for the Arizona House of Representatives, winning one of the two seats from Graham County. He did not run for re-election in 1932.

Lines died on September 21, 1961, in Mesa.
