= Charles R. Waters =

American politician from Arizona

Charles Waters

Member of the Arizona Senate from the Mohave County district
- In office January 1927 – December 1928
- Preceded by: Kean St. Charles
- Succeeded by: Kean St. Charles

Member of the Arizona House of Representatives from the Mohave County district
- In office January 1919 – December 1920

Personal details
- Born: Charles Richard Waters
- Died: October 26, 1933 Los Angeles, California
- Party: Democratic
- Profession: Politician

Charles Richard Waters was an American politician from Arizona. He served a single term in the Arizona State Senate during the 8th Arizona State Legislature, holding the seat from Mohave County. Prior to that, he held the single seat from Mohave County in the Arizona House of Representatives during the 4th Arizona State Legislature.

Waters ran for the single seat from Mohave County to the Arizona House of Representatives in 1918, winning the seat. In 1926 he ran again for the state legislature, this time for the Arizona State Senate from Mohave County, and again won. Waters died on October 26, 1933, in Los Angeles, California, after a long illness.
