= A. J. Eddy =

American politician

Member of the Arizona Senate from the Yuma County district
- In office January 1921 – December 1922
- Preceded by: Mulford Winsor
- Succeeded by: Mulford Winsor

Member of the Arizona House of Representatives from the Yuma County district
- In office January 1917 – December 1920

Personal details
- Born: 1880
- Died: January 1976 (aged 95–96) Yuma, Arizona
- Party: Democratic
- Spouse: Marion
- Profession: Politician

A. J. Eddy (1880–1976) was an American politician from Arizona. He served a single term in the Arizona State Senate during the 5th Arizona State Legislature, holding the two seat from Yuma County. He also served two terms in the Arizona House of Representatives, and was a long time deputy attorney for Yuma County. He was a veteran of the Spanish-American War, and in 1922 set a legal precedent when his testimony became the first time forensic ballistics was used in the conviction of a murderer in the United States.

== Biography ==
Eddy was born in 1880. At the outbreak of the Spanish-American War, Eddy enlisted in the U. S. Navy. He was only 16 at the time, but told the recruiter he was 21. During his three years of service, he was assigned to the USS Monterey, which was assigned to the waters surrounding the Philippine Islands. He was present when Admiral Dewey took Manila. He moved to Arizona in 1908. Eddy lived in Bouse, Arizona, where he operated the Bouse Auto Livery, until he moved his family and the business to Yuma in 1913, and bought a share of Riley's Garage. He put himself through correspondence school in the 1910s and became an attorney, entering the Arizona Bar in 1918.

In 1916 he ran for the Democrat nomination for the Arizona House of Representatives for one of the two seats from Yuma County. Along with James L. Edwards, Eddy won the Democrat nomination, and the two Democrats easily defeated their Republican opponents in the November general election. In 1918 Eddy ran for, and won, re-election to the House. In 1920, Eddy ran for and won the Arizona State Senate seat from Yuma County. During the regular session in 1921, he sponsored more bills than any other senator.

In 1922 he testified at the trial of Paul Hadley, alias William S. Estaver for first degree murder in the killing of Anna C. Johnson. Eddy testified that he had conducted tests which showed that the markings on bullets fired from a gun taken from Estaver matched the markings on the bullets recovered from Johnson's corpse. The defense vigorously attacked Eddy's claim of being a pistol expert. Hadley/Estaver was convicted, and his conviction was appealed to the Arizona State Supreme Court, one of the grounds being the standing of Eddy as a pistol expert. The Supreme Court upheld the conviction. It became a landmark case for being the first time ballistics were used to help convict a suspect.

From the early 1920s through the 1940s, Eddy served on and off as the deputy Yuma County attorney. Eddy died in January 1976 in Yuma, Arizona.
