= Noble H. Getchell =

American politician from Nevada

N. H. Getchell
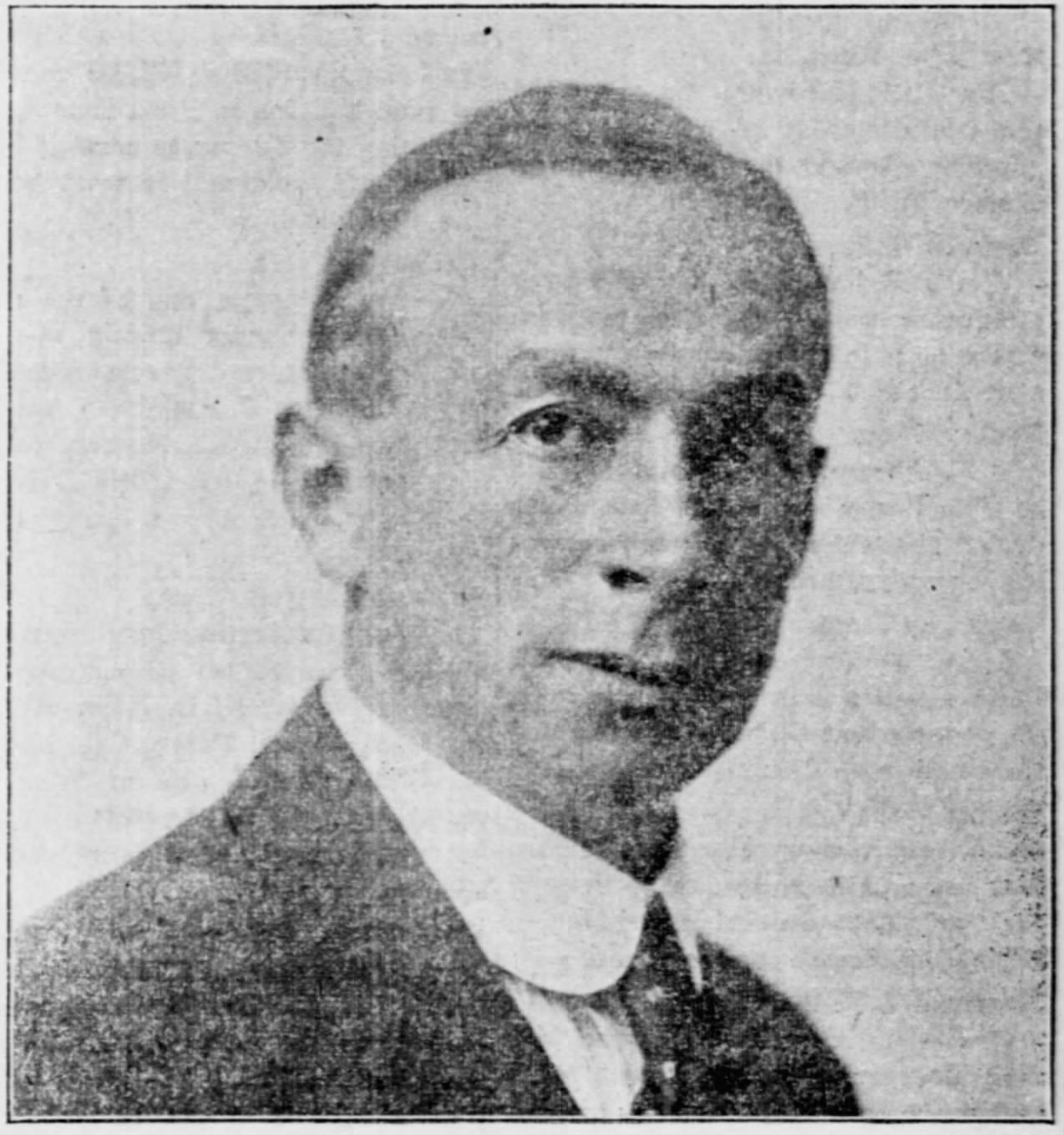
- Getchell, ca. 1916

Member of the Arizona Senate from the Yavapai County district
- In office January 1917 – December 1918
- Preceded by: Morris Goldwater; Frances Munds
- Succeeded by: A. A. Johns; Charles P. Hicks

Member of the Nevada Senate from the Lander County district
- In office 1922–1942

Personal details
- Born: February 7, 1875 Oakland, California
- Died: February 10, 1960 (aged 85) Auburn, California
- Party: Republican
- Spouse: Louise M. Geyer
- Profession: Politician

Noble Hamilton Getchell (1875–1960) was an American miner and politician from Nevada. He served five consecutive terms in the Nevada State Senate from 1922 through 1942. He also served in the Arizona State Senate from 1917 through 1918, during the 3rd Arizona State Legislature. He was the chairman of the Nevada Republican Committee for 12 years, followed by 13 years as the National Committeeman for the Republicans in Nevada. He was in the mining field, doing exploration and development in Alaska, Colorado, Arizona, Washington, and most significantly in Nevada. The mineral Getchellite is named after him, and for several decades, until its demolition in 2013, the library at the University of Nevada was named after him.

== Early life ==
Getchell was born in Oakland, California on February 7, 1875. He attended the Oakland Unified School District before going to work for his father in the mining business. His father was Lysander W. Getchell, who was a miner and surveyor, the community of Getchell, Washington was named after Lysander. Lysander was a member of the Nevada State House of Representatives in 1886–1887. He was also one of the first regents of the University of Nevada, and was one of the people primarily responsible for moving the university to Reno from Elko.

He graduated from the University of Washington with a degree in mining engineering. In 1890, Getchell went to Alaska, first working as a shopkeeper in Juneau, before gaining some hands-on experience in mining in the Klondike. After Alaska, he went to work at the Mammoth Mine in Silver City, Idaho, of which his father was part-owner. He worked as the superintendent of the mine. In 1895, while at the Mammoth Mine, he was one of the first mining operators to reduce his worker's work day to 8 hours. This was before legislation required 8 hour work days. In 1903 he was living in Tonopah, Nevada, and had taken over the Post group of mines near Grantsville for development. He married Louise M. Geyer of Austin in 1906.

== Life in Arizona ==
Around 1910, he went with his father to Arizona, where he worked in the mines. In 1911, he was working in southern Arizona. His father was a partner with D. B. Dyer and William F. Cody in several mineral properties near Oracle. When the mines were incorporated into the Cody-Dyer Arizona Mining and Milling Company in November 1911, Cody was the president, Dyer the vice-president, Lysander Getchell was the general manager, and Noble Getchell was the secretary. Getchell was also in charge of all operations at the mine. The younger Getchell served as the general manager of the Buffalo Bill Mine.

In 1913, the Getchells had moved on to Prescott, where the father and son, along with a third partner, organized the Y-P Mining Company. The company included the Cash Mine, one of the most important gold mines in Yavapai County, and Getchell was the general manager of the operation. In 1913, in addition to his duties at the Y. P. Mines, Getchell also purchased and began to develop the Champion group of mines which lay on the other side of the mountain from the Y-P holdings. Getchell sold the Y-P holdings in early 1916, although he remained on as general manager through 1919.

In August 1916, Getchell announced his intention to run for one of the two State Senate seats from Yavapai County. He won in the November election, being one of the few Republicans serving in the 3rd Arizona State Legislature, serving as one of two senators from Yavapai County. Getchell developed several other mineral properties in Arizona during the 1910s. Getchell also served as the superintendent of the Arizona and Eastern Railway.

== Nevada career ==
In 1920, Getchell moved his attention to Nevada, when he took over the Estella and Betty O'Neal mines, located near Battle Mountain. Getchell's father had been the last operator of the Betty O'Neal Mine, back in 1882, when a fatal explosion had occurred, and the mine was shut down. The O'Neal mine had been dormant for 38 years; however, shortly after Getchell took it over and began to redevelop the property, a large vein of silver was uncovered. With the success of his new mill design at the Betty O'Neal, Getchell had the company purchase the Cash Mine in Arizona, which he had operated previously, in order to install a similar mill there. The Betty O'Neal Mines sold the operating rights to the Cash Mine in 1926, but retained title on the property.

In 1923, Getchell obtained a controlling interest the J & J Mining Company, which operated the lead-producing American Beauty Mine, near Elko, Nevada. Getchell took over the J & J, becoming its president. In 1924, he added several more mineral properties to his portfolio: the M. J. Mine, the Elko Prince Mine, and the Eastern Star Mine in the Gold Circle district near Elko. In 1925, he acquired the Elko Prince Mine near Midas. Also in 1925, Getchell acquired two more mineral properties. First, in May, he became president of the Dan Tucker Mining Company, which owned the Sand Springs Mine. Then in October Getchell purchased the London-Silver Lead Mines Company, which operated lead and silver producing properties near Mina. In 1926, Getchell formed the Gold Circle Consolidated Mines company, which operated numerous mines, including the Elko Prince, Missing Link, Grant, Jackson, Hutchinson, and Reco mines. In December of that year, the company expanded when they purchased the Noble group of mineral claims near Midas. Later in 1926, Getchell purchased the Battle Mountain Scout, a newspaper in Lander County.

In 1927, Getchell purchased the National Group of mines. Later that same year, he purchased the Hess Mine near Alturas, California in Modoc County. He also purchased another mine in the Alturas region, the Lost Cabin Mine, in which a lucrative vein was discovered two years later. In February 1929 Getchell brokered a deal to acquire the Eastern Star Mine, which was near his Golden Circle properties. Two months later, he formed the Security Mining Corporation to handle the mine, receiving funding from a New York City based investment group. In 1934, Getchell sold the Eastern Star to a group of investors in Boston. The same month he formed Security Mining, he also acquired a copper mine in the Copper Basin, the Dean-Lang group. In the fall of 1929, Getchell traveled to Snohomish County in Washington State, where he scaled a mountain using ropes and chicken ladders to reach a mineral property. After inspecting the site, he organized the Skykomish Copper Company to develop the site and bring it into production.

In 1930, Getchell's Gold Circle Consolidated group purchased the Betty O'Neal group, including the Cash Mine in Arizona. The two groups of shareholders contained most of the same of the people. In 1931, Getchell purchased the Mary Mine, near his existing Gold Circle properties, with several other investors, including Jack Dempsey. Dempsey had a training site established at the mine so that he could train while at the property. In 1935, Getchell restructured the debt of the Gold Circle Consolidated corporation, by obtaining an infusion of cash from a group of eastern investors and reorganizing the company as the Circle Gold & Silver Mines, Inc. The deal removed all of the company's debt, and Getchell remained as the company's president and general manager. In the fall of 1936, Getchell resigned as the president and manager of the Circle Gold & Silver Mines.

In May 1936, Getchell, along with George Wingfield, traveled to the Kelley Creek area, about thirty miles northeast of Golcanda. Getchell had sent out two prospectors, Emmet Chase and Ed Knight, to inspect a different potential mineral deposit, at which they found disappointing results. On their return to report to Getchell, they noticed the outcropping and took several samples. The results of those assays prompted Getchell and Wingfield to go look at the property themselves. They purchased the rights from the two prospectors, and over the next two months, the two men purchased over 1200 acres of property in the area, mostly from the Central Pacific Land Company, and began developing the mineral property. The resource was known as the Getchell Mine. While Wingfield served as the mine's president, and Getchell as its vice-president, Getchell was the principal owner. In May 1937, Bernard Baruch showed interest in the mine, visiting the site. Baruch helped Getchell and Wingfield obtain the financing for the mine by bringing in Newmont Mining Company as an investor. The three major shareholders of the Getchell mine were Getchell, Wingfield, and the Newmont Mining Corporation.

By November 1937, the Getchell Mine consisted of over 18,500 acres, and was erecting a 600-ton per day mill on the property. A road had been put in, connecting them to Golconda and Midas, and they had also contracted to have power lines extended to the property by the Sierra Consolidated Power Company, and were building several structures on site. The mill was completed by January 1938, and the mine went into production in mid-1938. By 1940 the mine was the largest gold producer in the state of Nevada. In the 1950s and 1960s, it was one of the world's richest gold and tungsten producers.

In 1938, while developing the Getchell Mine, Getchell also continued to seek out and develop other mineral properties. In April Getchell took control of, with three partners, and began to develop a gold and copper property in Copper Basin, seven miles southwest of Battle Mountain. The operation was incorporated as the Gold Dome Mining Company. He also incorporated Gold Trail, Inc. with his partner, James O. Greenan, which operated the Gold Trail Mine and the nearby Rocky Hill Mine, both lying just south of Reno. He and several other partners also owned the Mountain City High Ore Copper Mining Company, which operated a copper mine near Mountain City. In 1939, the Gold Trail company expanded by taking an option in the Dean Mine, located in Lewis Canyon, near the Betty O'Neal mine. In early 1940 Getchell purchased another series of mines and claims, as well as a mill about a mile east of Silver City. The mines were the Silver King, Will-Emma, and Buckeye, and the deal included the Trimble Mill. In August Getchell formed a new corporation, the Gold Rock Mining Company to operate the mines and mill.

In 1945, he was one of the founders, and first president, of the Western American Life Insurance Company. Over the years he was a director at the First National Bank of Nevada and Battle Mountain State Bank. He was also the president of the Western States Life Insurance Company. Getchell served as chairman of the American Mining Congress in 1940. Getchell also served on Nevada's Fish and Game Commission, at one point serving as its president.

== Nevada political career ==
In 1922, he was elected to the Nevada State Senate, as a senator from Lander County, having run uncontested in the election. He served the next twenty years in the senate over five consecutive terms. He was credited with being one of the politicians responsible for Nevada's conservative fiscal and tax rules during the 1930s through 1950s. He served as the senate's president pro tem in 1927. In 1925, Getchell authored a bill in the legislature which allowed candidates from third or fourth parties to run in state elections, instead of limiting elections to the two major parties. In 1926, Getchell ran unopposed for re-election to the Nevada State Senate. When the legislature convened in 1927, Getchell was unanimously elected president pro tem. In 1928, Getchell became the chairman of the Nevada State Republican Committee. That same year he was selected to be one of three presidential electors from Nevada. In 1929, he was one of the principle members of a bipartisan committee created to reach a compromise on the design of the new state flag for Nevada.

In 1930, Getchell was re-elected as the state chairman of the Republican Party in Nevada. In July 1930, Getchell announced his intention to run for re-election for the State Senate from Lander County. He ran unopposed in the primary, and beat Andrew Kinneberg in the general election. In 1932, Getchell was re-elected for a third straight consecutive term as the state chairman of the Republican Party in Nevada, although he did not actively run for the position. In 1934, he ran for re-election to the Nevada State Senate, being unopposed in both the primary and general election. In 1934, despite strong urging for him to run again, Getchell did not seek to repeat as Republican state chairman. In 1938, Getchell ran for re-election to the State Senate. He was unopposed in the primary, and easily beat his Democrat opponent, V. C. Clarke, 535 to 298.

In 1940, he was elected to the post of Republican national committeeman. In 1942, Getchell decided not to run for a sixth-consecutive term as the state senator from Lander County. He was re-elected as Republican national committeeman in 1944. In 1948, Getchell was again re-elected as the Nevada national committeeman for the Republican Party, this time unanimously. In April 1952, Getchell announced that he would not be seeking re-election as the National Committeeman for the Republicans. However, Getchell did seek and win election to become one of Nevada's three presidential electors that same year. The Democrats had controlled the presidency since 1932. With Eisenhower's win in November, the three Republican electors were the first to cast their votes for the president in 24 years, since 1928. Getchell had also cast an electoral vote for president in 1928.

== Later life and legacy ==
In 1957, he was awarded an honorary doctorate in mining economics from the University of Nevada. In 1959 the University of Nevada named its library the Noble H. Getchell Library in honor of him. The library was demolished in 2013 to make room for the William N. Pennington Student Achievement Center. On February 10, 1960, Getchell died after a long illness. At the time he was at the home of friends in Auburn, California, who he was visiting.

In 1962, Getchellite was discovered at the Getchell Mine, and was named after Getchell. In 1991, it was discovered that the design of Nevada's state flag was not the design approved by the Nevada legislature in 1929. Getchell had served on the committee which reached a compromise regarding the placement of the word, "Nevada" on the flag. In the compromise, "Nevada" was supposed to be placed "immediately below the sprays in silver Roman letters to conform with the letters in the word 'Battle Born'". This compromise was the official design approved by the legislature. However, when the governor signed the actual bill the amendment with the compromise was left out. So for 62 years, the state was flying a flag with an incorrect design.
