= Howard Cornick =

American politician

Member of the Arizona Senate from the Yavapai County district
- In office January 1923 – December 1924
- Preceded by: David Morgan; Charles E. Burton
- Succeeded by: A. H. Favour; Wayne Thornburg

Personal details
- Party: Democratic
- Profession: Politician

Howard Cornick was an American politician from Arizona. He served a single term in the Arizona State Senate during the 6th Arizona State Legislature, holding one of the two seats from Yavapai County.

Cornick was born in Knoxville, Tennessee, in 1874 or 1875. He was a graduate of the University of Tennessee College of Law. He moved to Arizona in 1918, becoming a partner in the law firm of Favour and Baker, before eventually forming his own law partnership, Cornick and Carr. He died in Prescott, Arizona, on September 2, 1945.
