= George H. Chase =

American politician from Arizona (1843–1918)

Member of the Arizona Senate from the Greenlee County district
- In office March 1912 – January 1917
- Preceded by: First Senator from Greenlee County
- Succeeded by: W. D. Whipple

Personal details
- Born: May 21, 1843 Glen Falls, New York
- Died: July 18, 1918 (aged 75) Clifton, Arizona
- Party: Democratic
- Profession: Politician

George H. Chase (1843–1918) was a politician in Arizona, who served in the first two state legislatures as a state senator.

== Life ==
Born on May 21, 1843, in Glen Falls, New York, he moved to Milwaukee, Wisconsin. He was also related to Salmon P. Chase, a member of Abraham Lincoln's cabinet. He served with Union Army during the Civil War, with some sources saying he was in the Army of the Frontier, while his obituary stating that he was a member of Harris' Light Cavalry (known officially as the 2nd New York Cavalry Regiment), where he reached the rank of sergeant-major. He was wounded three times in the three years he served. In Wisconsin, he met and married his wife on Valentine's Day, 1897. The following year they moved to Clifton, Arizona, where he became employed as a pattern maker for the Arizona Copper Company. He was affectionally called "Uncle George" by the locals. After moving to Arizona, he and his wife lived their entire lives in Clifton, Arizona. He had several business interests, including mining, a limo service, and a building contractor.

On July 18, 1918, Chase arose from bed at his usual 6:00 am time, but went back to bed shortly after. His wife, believing him to be asleep, did her morning household chores, attempting not to wake him, but when she went to check on him about 8:45, she realized he was dead and called a doctor. The cause of death was ruled apoplexy.

== Political career ==
In 1911, he announced his intention to run for the state senate seat from Greenlee County. He was unopposed in the Democrat primary, and won the general election in December.

In 1914, he announced his intention to run for re-election, and was returned to the state senate in the November general election.

In 1916, while still serving in the Senate, he ran for justice of the piece in Greenlee County, but was defeated by D. E. Andress in the Democrat primary.
