= W. D. Whipple =

American politician in Arizona

Member of the Arizona Senate from the Greenlee County district
- In office January 1917 – December 1918
- Preceded by: George H. Chase
- Succeeded by: H. A. Elliott

Personal details
- Party: Democratic
- Profession: Politician

William D. Whipple was an Arizona politician who served a single term in the Arizona State Senate during the 3rd Arizona State Legislature.

His father, William M. Whipple, was an Arizona pioneer, having moved to the state in 1876. He also served as the representative from Greenlee County in the State House of Representatives in the 1st Arizona State Legislature. During the 1900s, he established and ran the Clifton Dairy, which he sold in 1910. He married Myrtle McDowell on July 14, 1912. In 1916 he ran for the State Senate from Greenlee County. He defeated J. W. Aker in the Democrat's primary, and then defeated Republican R. W. Chamberlain in the general election in November.
