= Charles E. Larson =

American politician from Arizona

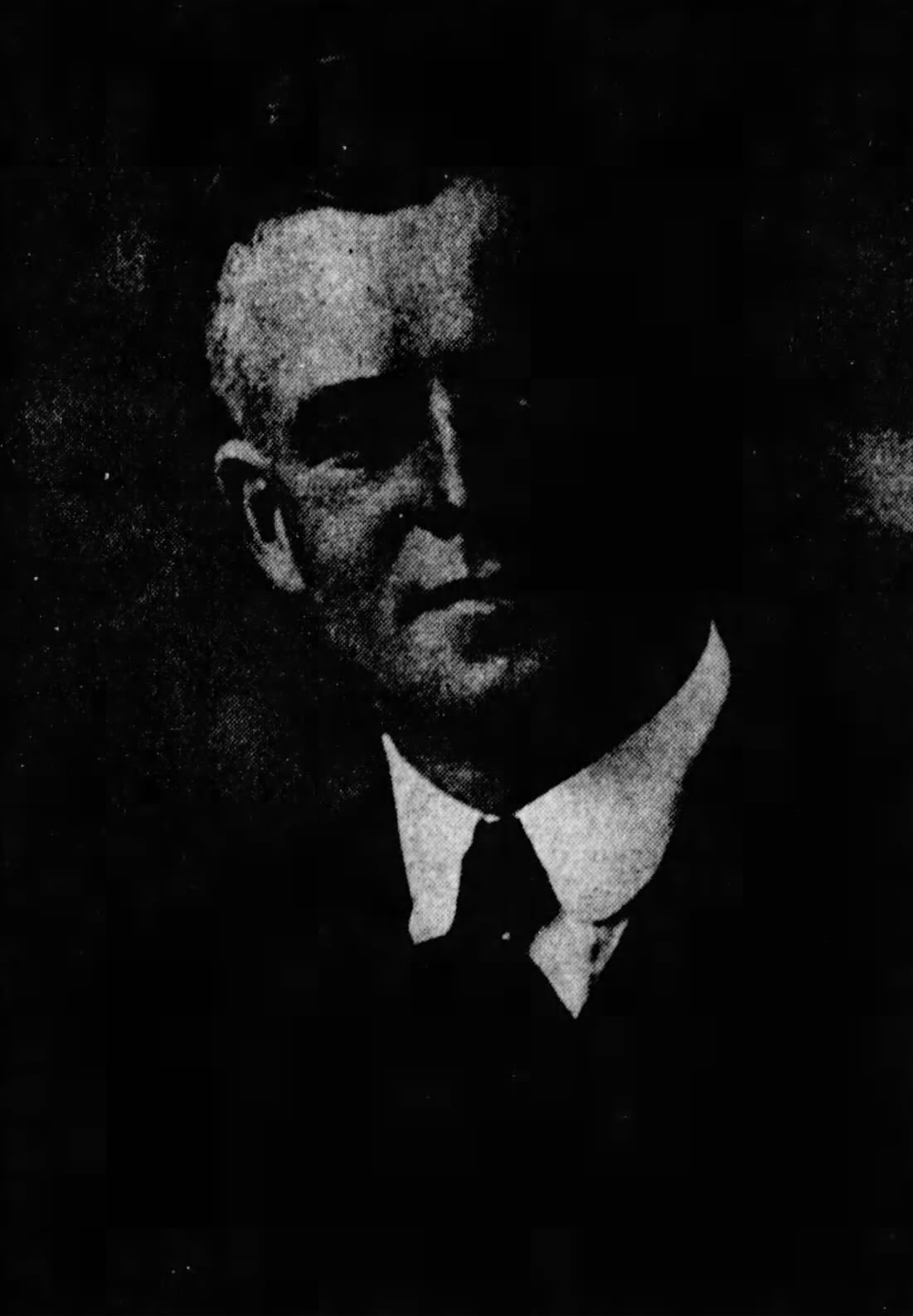
- Larson, ca. 1920

Member of the Arizona Senate from the Coconino County district
- In office January 1921 – December 1922
- Preceded by: Hugh E. Campbell
- Succeeded by: Hugh E. Campbell

Personal details
- Party: Republican
- Profession: Politician

Charles E. Larson was an American politician from Arizona. He served a single term in the Arizona State Senate during the 5th Arizona State Legislature, holding the seat from Coconino County. While he lived in Arizona he engaged in the sheep-raising business, and later moved to Los Angeles where he manufactured lamps.

== Biography ==
In 1916, Larson ran for the Republican nomination for the seat from Coconino County in the Arizona House of Representatives. He lost in a close primary race by 13 votes to T. H. Cureton, who would go on to win the seat in November's general election. Larson was married to Mabelle Jeffries on January 2, 1919, in Atlanta, Georgia, where the bride was from. Her brother was doctor C. D. Jeffries of Williams, Arizona, where she had been visiting the prior summer, and met her future husband.

In 1920, Larson ran unopposed for the Republican nomination for the single seat in the Arizona State Senate from Coconino County. He easily defeated Democrat Will Marlar in the November general election, 1322–795. He did not run for re-election in 1922. By 1926, Larson had relocated to Los Angeles, California, where he opened the Larson Manufacturing Company, which produced lamps. Larson died in Los Angeles, on September 13, 1937.
