= Mohave County Miner =

Newspaper published in Kingman, Arizona

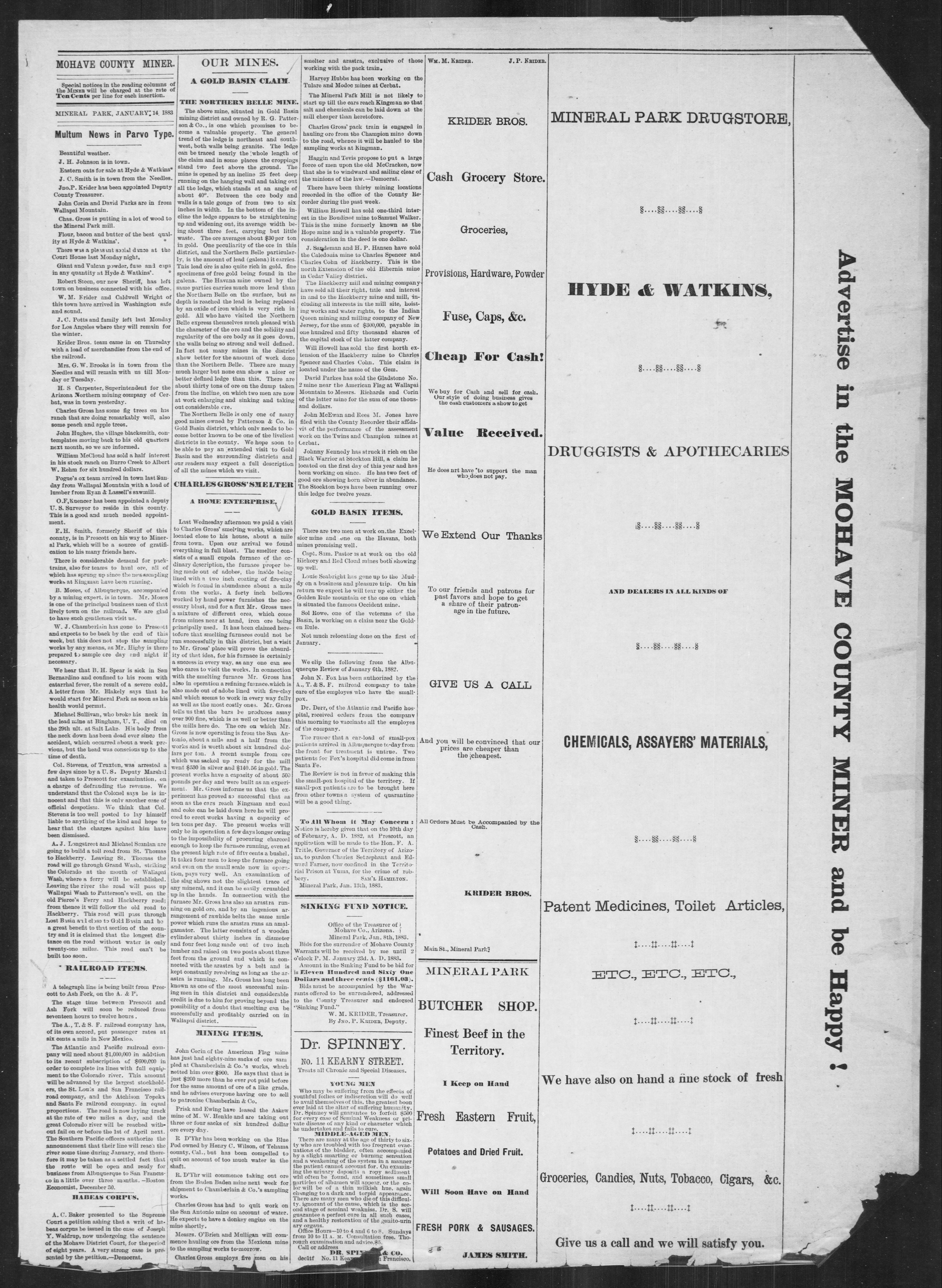
- Cover of January 14, 1883 issue
- Format: Weekly
- Founder: Anson H. Smith
- Editor: James J. Hyde
- Founded: November 5, 1882
- Ceased publication: October 31, 1974
- Language: English
- City: Mineral Park, Arizona (1882-1885), Kingman, Arizona (1885-1974)
- Country: United States
- ISSN: 2151-4003
- OCLC number: 8793635 11364036, 8793635

Mohave County Miner was a newspaper, founded by Anson H. Smith, which began operations on November 5, 1882, in Mineral Park, Arizona, in the back room of Hyde's Drug Store. It replaced The Alta Arizona, a magazine which had begun the preceding year. The paper was printed on one of the first Chicago stop-cylinder presses ever manufactured, and consisted of seven columns. Smith won enough money playing faro from Judge James Reed Russell to erect the newspaper's building on Beale Street. In 1885, Smith moved to Kingman, Arizona and started another paper, the Walapai Tribune. He sold his interest in the Miner to James J. Hyde in 1886. Hyde was editor in 1886 and 1887, when the paper moved operations to Kingman. Smith repurchased the paper in 1891, and took over both as editor and publisher. While remaining the publisher of the paper, Minnie A. Sawyer became the editor in 1895. She remained editor until 1917, when Smith once again resumed those duties.

In 1918, the paper merged with Our Mineral Wealth, which had been established in 1893 in Kingman by Kean St. Charles. He remained editor and publisher until 1916, when Samuel N. Whitaker became editor, and the paper was bought by Kingman Publishing Company. However, St. Charles would remain affiliated with the paper until 1922. In 1917, the year before the merger with the Miner, Edward S. Hanson became the editor of the Our Mineral Wealth. Once the two papers merged, the new name became Mohave County Miner and Our Mineral Wealth, and continued as a weekly paper with Smith as the editor. In 1922, the paper returned to being called the Mohave County Miner, and remained under that name until its closure in 1974. Smith remained at the paper until he died in 1935.
