= James E. Curtin =

American politician

James Curtin

Member of the Arizona Senate from the Mohave County district
- In office January 1921 – December 1922
- Preceded by: C. W. Herndon
- Succeeded by: Kean St. Charles

Personal details
- Party: Democratic
- Profession: Politician

James Curtin was an American politician from Arizona. He served a single term in the Arizona State Senate during the 5th Arizona State Legislature, holding the seat from Mohave County. He also served as the deputy sheriff of Mohave County. Outside of politics, he was involved in mining and ranching.

== Biography ==
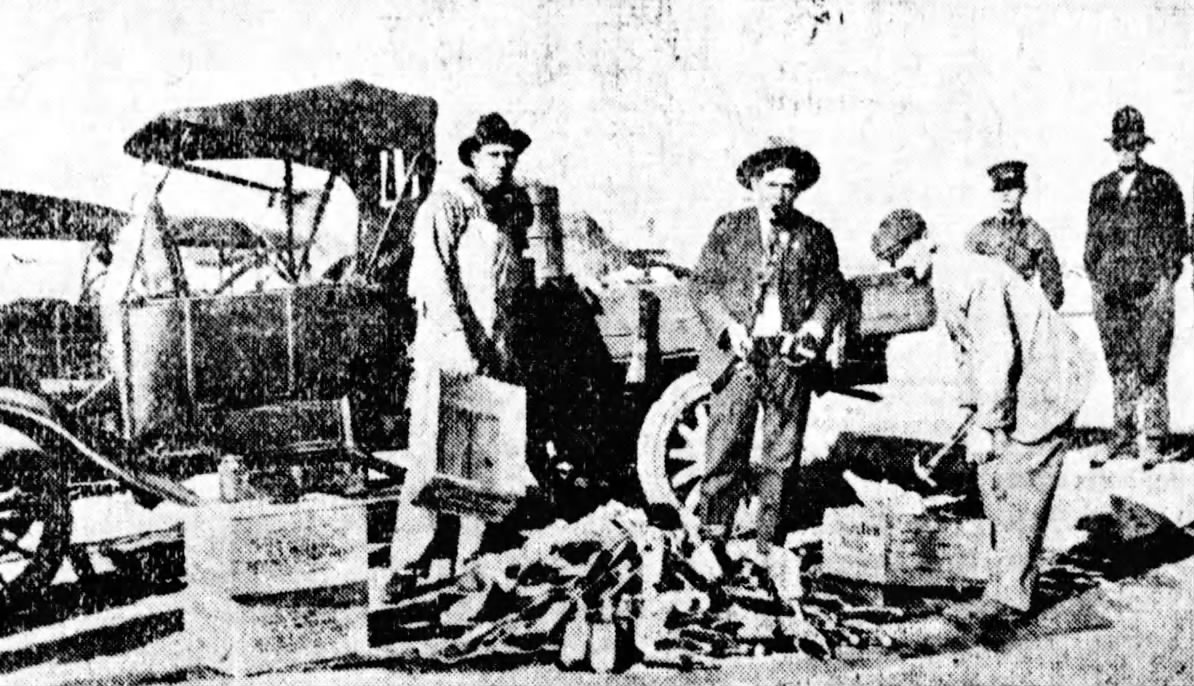
Curtin, as deputy sheriff, supervising destruction of illegal still during Prohibition, 1919

By 1915 Curtin was living in Oatman, Arizona. In 1916, along with W. P. Mahoney, Curtin bought a ranch near Oatman at Cerbat. Curtin was also the superintendent at the Cash Mine. In 1919, after Mahoney had been elected sheriff of Mohave County, he appointed Curtin as his deputy sheriff.

In 1920, he ran for the state senate seat from Mohave County. He ran unopposed in the Democrat primary, and easily defeated his Republican opponent, R. W. Wilde, in the November general election. During the 5th Legislature, he authored a bill regarding workmen's compensation, which would serve as the platform for the Workmen's Compensation Act of 1925, which became an amendment to the Arizona Constitution in September 1925. In 1921, Curtin, again with Mahoney, organized the Comstock Consolidated Gold Mining Company. In April 1922 Curtin announced his intention to run for re-election. He was opposed by Kean St. Charles in the Democrat primary, who narrowly defeated him, 967–831. By 1922 Curtin was living in Kingman, Arizona.
