= Hugh E. Campbell =

American politician in Arizona

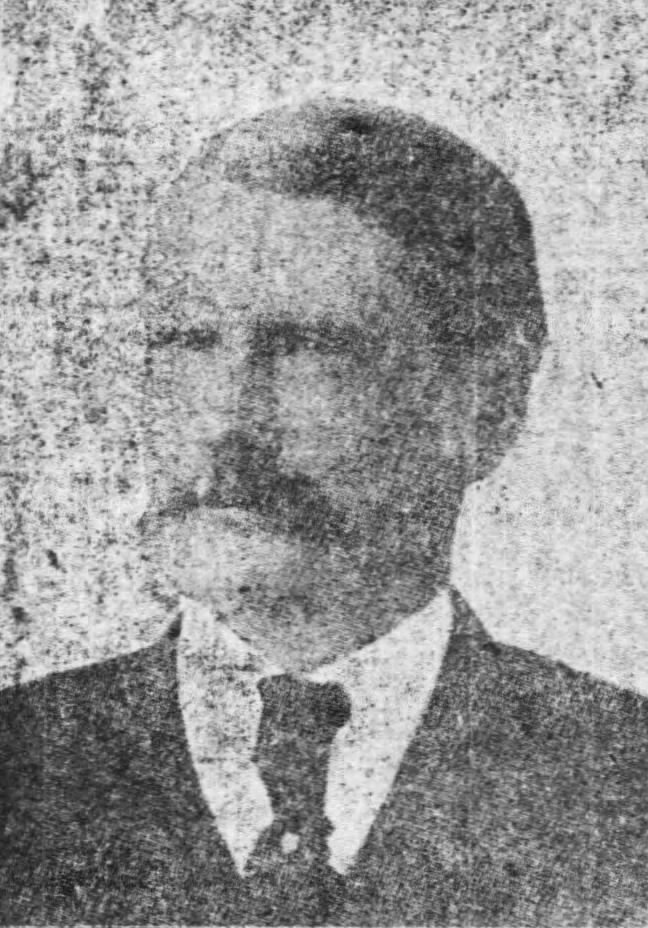
- Campbell, ca. 1914

Member of the Arizona Senate from the Coconino County district
- In office January 1915 – January 1921
- Preceded by: Fred S. Breen
- Succeeded by: Charles E. Larson

Member of the Arizona Senate from the Coconino County district
- In office January 1923 – July 1923 (his death)
- Preceded by: Charles E. Larson
- Succeeded by: Fred S. Breen

Personal details
- Born: June 10, 1862 Nova Scotia, Canada
- Died: July 13, 1923 (aged 61) Flagstaff, Arizona
- Party: Democratic
- Spouse: Madie
- Children: Danny, Luella, Mary (died age 5)
- Profession: Politician

Hugh E. Campbell was a politician from Arizona who served in the Arizona state senate for four terms. He was the Arizona Democrat delegate to their national convention in 1896. He was one of the largest sheep ranchers in Arizona, and was prominent in both the National Wool Growers Association and the National Livestock Association. For six years he served on the board of the Arizona State Fair commission, five as its president.

== Personal life ==
Hugh Campbell was born in rural Nova Scotia, Canada, about 100 miles north of the United States border on June 10, 1862. At the age of 14 he left home, and when he was 18 immigrated to Wisconsin. Three years later, Campbell moved to Arizona in the early 1880s, and initially worked in lumber camps and saw mills, until beginning to raise sheep in 1886.

Campbell married Madie Chrisman on November 19, 1893, in Los Angeles. Chrisman was the daughter of Isaac Chrisman, a local Flagstaff hotelier. Their eldest daughter, Martha, died at age 5 on September 14, 1902, of typhoid fever. Her death came less than a week after Mary gave birth to another daughter, Luella, on September 9. In addition to the two girls, the Campbells also had a son, named Danny. Dan Campbell attended Stanford University, and in April 1917, shortly after the U.S. entered World War I, he enlisted in the navy. He served as a gunner's mate, assigned to merchant vessels sailing to Europe. In July 1918, the ship he was stationed on was torpedoed by a German submarine and sunk. There was only a single fatality on the ship, and the rest of the ship's crew was picked up by an American destroyer after approximately 17 hours in lifeboats.

Campbell set a time record for traveling by car from Phoenix to Flagstaff in 1912. He was clocked at 8 hours, 37 minutes and 15 seconds. The time included a 10-minute stop for water at Wickenburg.

In 1923, he was diagnosed with stomach cancer. Following the regular session of the state legislature, he went to Cleveland for surgery, followed by a trip to California for more treatment. These proved ineffective and he died in his summer home in Flagstaff several months later on July 13, 1923.

In 1924, the Northern Arizona Normal School, now Northern Arizona University, named one of their women's dormitories after his wife in his honor. During his time in politics he had been a staunch supporter of the school.

== Career outside politics ==
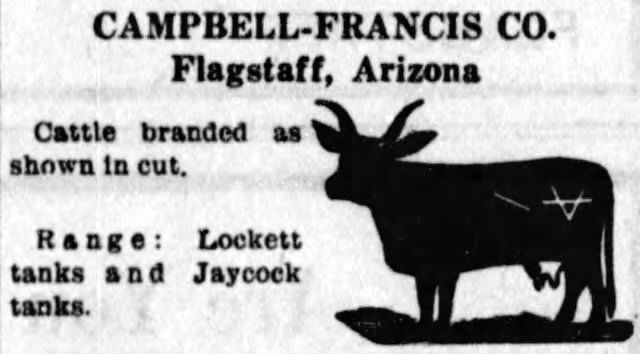
Cattle brand of Campbell-Francis Co.

Campbell was a sheep farmer and wool grower, from Flagstaff, Arizona In addition to his sheep farming activities, Campbell also ran a substantial herd of cattle. He also kept a home on North Central Avenue in Phoenix. He was a partner in the firm of Campbell & Francis (later Campbell-Francis Co.), which was one of the largest sheep companies in the Arizona Territory. By 1901 his herd numbered over 80,000 sheep, and was one of the largest flocks of sheep in Arizona. By 1910, his flock had grown to over 100,000 sheep.

In October 1900 he was selected to be the chief of the Flagstaff Fire Department.

Governor Richard Elihu Sloan appointed Campbell to the Arizona Territorial Fair Commission in 1909. The following year, he was elected to be president of that commission, and served in that capacity for the next 2 years, after which he became the president of the Arizona State Fair commission, for the first state fair in 1912. He continued as state fair president in 1913. Campbell, citing personal business reasons, resigned from the commission in January 1914. Governor Hunt initially did not accept the resignation, attempting to get Campbell to reconsider, but he eventually acceded to Campbell's wishes.

He was very active in both the National Wool Growers Association, at one point serving on its executive board, and the National Livestock Association, as well as being the president of the Arizona Wool Growers Association.

In 1920, an oil well near Breckenridge, Texas in which he was the primary investor became a high-producing property.

== Political career ==
In 1894 the Democrats nominated him for Coconino County Sheriff. However, he lost to the Republican, Ralph Cameron in November's general election. He was the Arizona representative to the Democrat's national convention in 1896, held in Chicago.

Campbell ran unopposed in the Democrat primary in 1914 for the state senate seat for Coconino County. In the general election Campbell defeated the Republican incumbent, Fred S. Breen by an over 2–1 margin. Although there was some talk of Campbell opposing Governor Hunt for governor during 1915, he put all questions to rest in July 1916 when he announced his candidacy for re-election to the state senate. He ran unopposed in both the Democrat's primary and the general election, being officially re-elected on November 7 to a second term in the state senate. During the 3rd legislature, Campbell was an ardent supporter of the law providing a minimum wage for women.

With the U.S.'s entry into World War I in 1917, Campbell was appointed to the National Defense Committee's subcommittee on raw wool, which was responsible for ensuring America's wool supply during the war. They even had authority to fix the price for raw wool.

Campbell announced his intention to run for re-election to the state senate in July 1918. Initially, it was thought that just like 1916, he would run unopposed in both the primary and general elections. However, he was perceived as an "anti-Hunt" (the Arizona Governor) Democrat, and the pro-Hunt Democrats put up John Hennessey, another prominent sheep rancher, to run against him in the primary. He defeated Hennessey soundly in the primary, and then faced off against Republican T. H. Cureton in the general election, who he soundly defeated in November. While there had been much talk of a Campbell possibly running for the Democrat's gubernatorial nomination to run against the Republican incumbent, Thomas Edward Campbell, during 1919 and early 1920, Campbell did not run for governor. In fact, he announced in August 1920 that he was not going to run for re-election to the state senate. In 1922, Campbell decided to run for the state senate once again. He ran unopposed in the Democrat primary, and faced off against Republican S. B. Gilliland in the general election, who he defeated.
