= J. B. Wylie =

American politician from Arizona

Member of the Arizona Senate from the Cochise County district
- In office January 1925 – December 1928
- Preceded by: C. M. Roberts
- Succeeded by: John Wilson Ross

Personal details
- Born: 1855
- Died: February 1, 1932 (aged 76–77) Douglas, Arizona
- Party: Democratic
- Profession: Politician

John B. Wylie (1855–1932) was an American politician from Arizona. He served two terms in the Arizona State Senate during the 7th and 8th Arizona State Legislatures, holding one of the two seats from Cochise County, following a stint in the Arizona House of Representatives during the 6th Arizona State Legislature.

Wylie was born in 1855. He served in the U. S. Army in the 1870s, and was involved in the Great Sioux War of 1876, being part of the relief for General Custer after the Battle of the Little Bighorn. He was also a veteran of the Spanish American War. After his arrival in Arizona, he was a long-time employee of the Calumet and Arizona Mining Company, and lived in Douglas, Arizona. He died at his home in Douglas on February 1, 1932, after a short illness.
