= Charles H. Rutherford =

American politician (1884–1950)

Charles Hays Rutherford
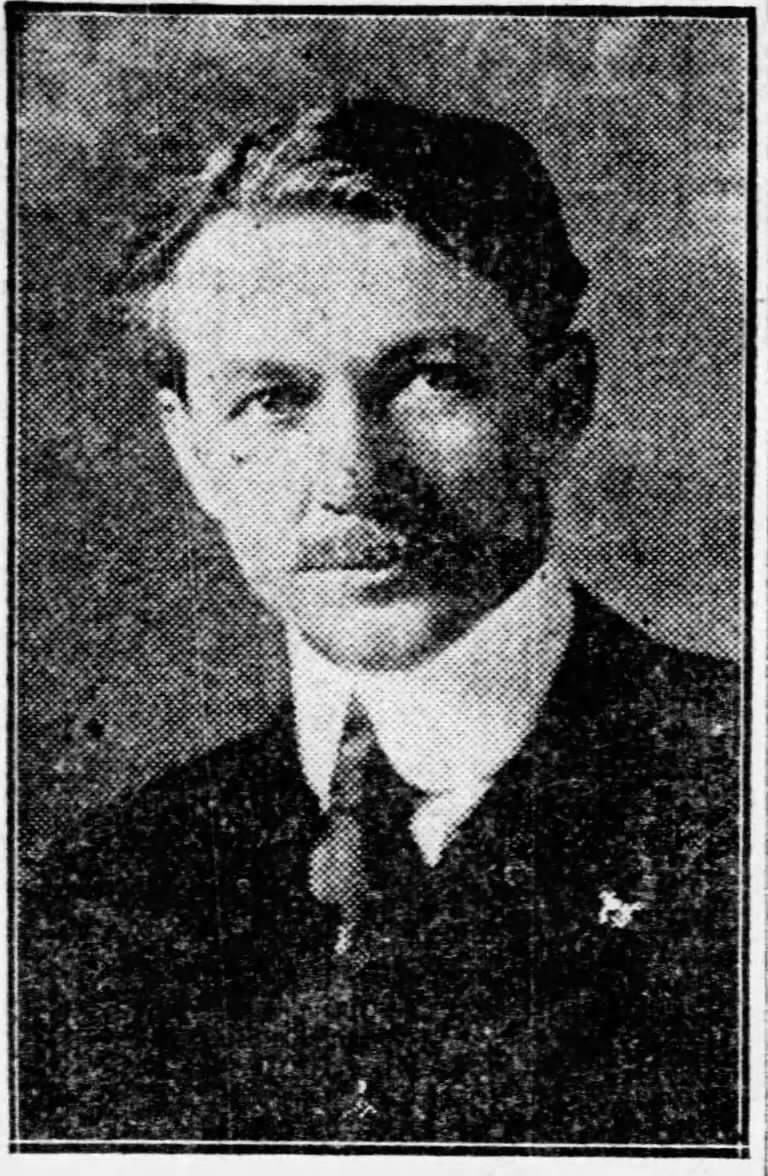
- Rutherford, ca. 1924

Member of the Arizona Senate from the Yavapai County district
- In office January 1917 – December 1918
- Preceded by: Morris Goldwater; Frances Munds
- Succeeded by: A. A. Johns; Charles P. Hicks

Personal details
- Born: 1884 New Hampshire, U.S.
- Died: November 27, 1950 (aged 65–66) Phoenix, Arizona, U.S.
- Party: Democratic
- Spouse: Erie Dykes
- Education: Marion Normal School
- Profession: Politician

Charles Hays Rutherford was an American lawyer and politician from Arizona who served in the Arizona State Senate from 1917 through 1918, during the 3rd Arizona State Legislature. He also served during the 6th Arizona State Legislature. He served in the Army Reserve, first in the JAG corps, then in the Specialist Reserve Corps, eventually attaining the rank of Colonel. From 1930 until his death in 1950 he served as a civilian aide to the Secretary of War. He practiced law, first in Indiana early in his career, and then in Arizona, until he was disbarred by the Arizona Supreme Court in 1949.

== Early life ==
Rutherford was born in New Hampshire in 1884, and attended the seminary in Montpelier, Vermont. Rutherford was a graduate of the Marion Normal School in Marion, Indiana. He opened a law practice with George W. Wells in Seymour, Indiana in 1904. The law practice did not last long and was dissolved later that year. In 1905 Rutherford was appointed as deputy prosecutor in Seymour.

He relocated to Prescott, Arizona in 1906, where he set up a law practice. Later in 1906 he had moved to Jerome, where he was appointed city attorney, a position he held for the next fifteen years. He was a large shareholder of and served as a director on the board of the Lloyd Consolidated Copper Company, which had extensive workings near Camp Verde. In 1907 a new townsite was set up near their mining operations, including a post office, and was named Rutherford, Arizona, after him. He was married to Erie Dykes on November 8, 1909, in King County, Washington.

== Political career ==
In 1911 he ran for the Democrat's nomination for one of the two state senate seats from Yavapai County. He lost in the Democrat's primary to H. R. Wood and M. G. Cunniff. In 1913, Rutherford was appointed the Navajo County attorney. In 1914 Rutherford once again ran for the State Senate. It was a crowded race, with seven candidates running for the two senate seats. Rutherford came in fourth, behind winners Morris Goldwater and Frances Munds, as well F. A. Reid. In 1916, he ran for the State Senate for a third time. This time he won the Democrat nomination for one of the two senate seats, coming in high man in the primary over Morris Goldwater and Nathan Shutz. In the general election, Rutherford won, however Goldwater was defeated by Republican Noble H. Getchell.

In July 1922, Rutherford announced he would be running for the State Senate for the fourth time. He, along with fellow Democrat, Howard Cornick, won the primary in September, and then went on to win the general election in November. He ran for re-election in 1924, with A. H. Favour, since Cornick did not choose to run again. In the general election Republican Wayne Thornburg led all vote getters, while Favour edged out Rutherford by 200 votes. In 1926 Rutherford announced his intention to seek the Democrat's nomination for the U. S. Senate. He was running to oppose the favorite, Carl Hayden, Arizona's representative in Congress since statehood, who had declared his intention to run for the Senate. Hayden was in favor of the Colorado River Compact, which Rutherford opposed. Rutherford was defeated by Hayden in the primary by a landslide margin. In 1928 Rutherford ran against Arizona's other senator, Henry F. Ashurst in the Democrat's primary. Ashurst defeated him by a 3–1 margin in the primary, 32,698 to 9,547.

In 1934 he again ran for the Democrat's nomination for U.S. Senate against incumbent Ashurst. In addition to Ashurst, there were three other candidates. Rutherford finished a distant fifth in the field of five. In 1944 he ran for mayor of Phoenix, however he and his entire ticket were defeated by incumbent mayor, J. R. Fleming and his ticket.

== Life outside politics ==
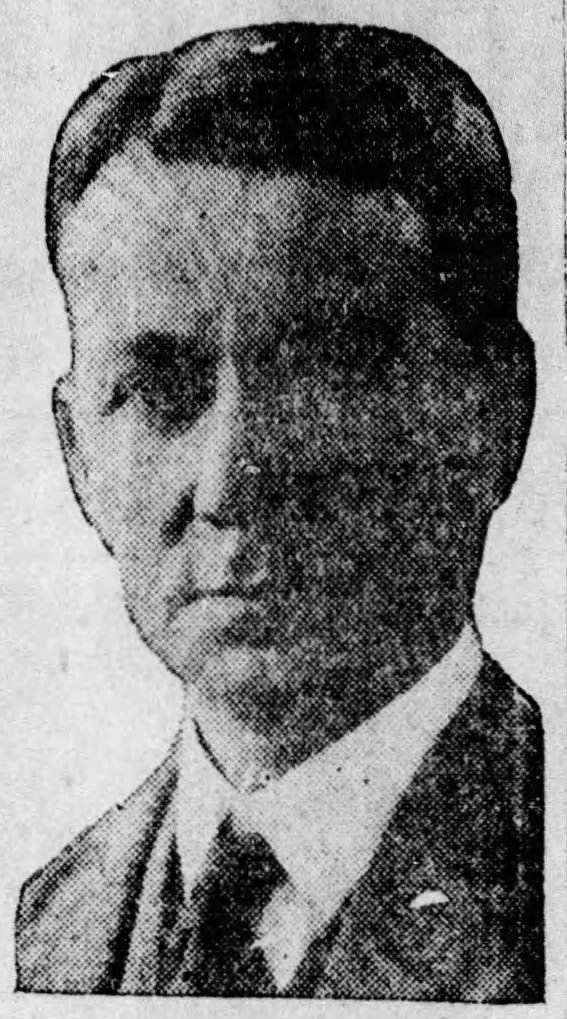
Rutherford, ca. 1926

In 1912 Rutherford invented a device to replace women's hatpins. It was a band which went inside the hat and had a small hook which kept the hat attached to the woman's hair. He came up with the idea after reading an article about a man who lost an eye while traveling on a streetcar and getting poked with a woman's hat pin. He incorporated the National Hat Fastener Co., with its headquarters in Phoenix, and contracted with a factory in Leominster, Massachusetts to manufacture the device. In 1918 Rutherford was one of the national spokesmen for the government's liberty bond drive, to support the U. S. war effort during World War I. He traveled the country aboard the "trophy train", giving speeches in support of buying the bonds. In 1921 he was elected president of the Yavapai County Bar Association. He had also served as a vice-president in the American Bar Association.

Rutherford was a major in the United States Army Reserve, as a member of the Judge Advocate General's Corps (JAG). In 1924 he organized, and was selected as the first president, of the Arizona chapter of US Reserve Officers Association. In 1925 Rutherford moved to Phoenix, and opened a law office there the following year. In 1929 Rutherford was promoted to colonel in the Specialist Reserve Corps, and was attached to the War Department in Washington, D. C.

In 1930 he was appointed as Arizona's civilian aide to the Secretary of War. One of his major responsibilities was overseeing the military training of civilians at Camp Stephen D. Little near Nogales. In 1933 the training was moved to Camp Huachuca. He was re-appointed in 1934, and was re-appointed every four years through 1950.

In 1938 he invented and patented a method for saving fruit from heavy frost, which became extensively used. In 1940 he was added to the 1940-41 edition of Who's Who In America. In June 1940 he was appointed to head the civil aeronautics training program in Arizona. In February 1949, Rutherford was disbarred by the Arizona Supreme Court in a unanimous 5-0 decision. The case involved Rutherford soliciting clients to seek settlements with the state industrial commission. He died on November 27, 1950, in Phoenix, and was buried in Greenwood Memory Lawn Cemetery.
