= H. A. Elliott =

American politician from Arizona

Member of the Arizona Senate from the Greenlee County district
- In office January 1919 – December 1926
- Preceded by: W. D. Whipple
- Succeeded by: Harry W. Hill

Personal details
- Party: Democratic
- Profession: Politician

Harold A. Elliott was an American lawyer and politician from Arizona. He served several terms in the Arizona State Senate from the 4th Arizona State Legislature through the 7th Arizona State Legislature. He graduated from the University of Michigan Law School, and became an attorney, eventually becoming Phelps Dodge's chief counsel.

== Biography ==
Elliott was born in Santa Monica, California on February 22, 1890. As a child, he moved with hit parents to Prescott, Arizona, and he graduated from the University of Michigan Law School

After graduating from law school in 1912, he moved back to Arizona and accepted a position as a clerk in the offices of Ellinwood and Ross in Bisbee. In October he was admitted to the Arizona Bar after passing his exams. He was authorized to practice in front of both the superior and federal courts. In 1913, Elliott left Ellinwood and Ross and went to work for the Arizona Copper Company in Clifton. On November 21, 1913, he married Grace A. Roberts of Tucson. The couple returned to Clifton, where Elliot was practicing law, to reside. The Couple had one son, John R. Elliott. In July 1918, Elliott announced his intention to run for the single seat from Greenlee County to the Arizona State Senate. He narrowly defeated A. R. Lynch in the Democrat's primary, and then ran unopposed in November's general election. In 1920 he ran for re-election, unopposed in both the primary and general elections.

In 1921, the Arizona Copper Company was taken over by the Phelps Dodge Corporation and became known as the Morenci branch of the corporation. Elliott became the attorney for that branch. In June 1922 Elliot again announced that he was running for re-election. He ran unopposed in the primary, and then easily defeated his Republican opponent, Dell M. Potter, in November's general election.

During the 1922 session of the state legislature, Elliott authored Senate Bill 43 (SB 43), which became known as the state finance code. The law revamped the financial systems and the methods of accounting used by the state, putting them more along the lines of an actual business. As such, Elliott became known as the "father of the financial code." With its passage, Arizona became only the fourth state in the nation to adopt a financial code, following Illinois, Iowa, and Nebraska. Even though Elliott was a Democrat, the bill was known as a Republican measure.

In 1924, he once again won re-election for the State Senate. By 1927, Elliott was the chief counsel for Phelps Dodge.

In 1933, Governor Moeur appointed Elliott to the Arizona Colorado River Commission. On September 22, 1939, while on a business trip to New Mexico, Elliott died of a heart attack in a Hot Springs hospital. Prior to entering the hospital, Elliott had apparently been a fight in a bar, during which he received several injuries. However, an investigation revealed that the injuries were not life-threatening, and that they did not lead to the heart attack.
