= Rosa Lyons McKay =

American politician (1881–1934)

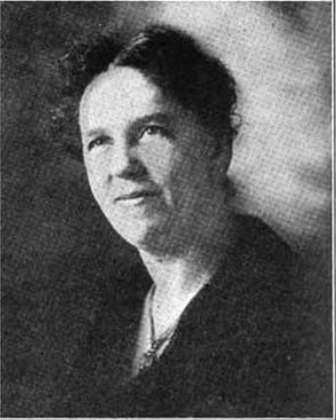
- Rosa McKay, from a 1918 publication
- Born: Rosa Jane Lyons; November 18, 1881; Idaho Springs, Colorado
- Died: March 20, 1934 (aged 52); Phoenix, Arizona
- Occupations: Legislator, suffragist
- Known for: member of Arizona state legislature (1919–1920, 1923–1924)

Rosa Lyons McKay (November 18, 1881 (Note: While many sources place the birth of Rosa Lyons in November 1881, she was listed as a 2-year-old child in her mother's Colorado household in the 1880 Federal Census (via Ancestry.com), suggesting a somewhat earlier date.) – March 20, 1934) was an American politician. She was one of the first women elected to the Arizona state legislature, serving in the 1917–1918, 1919–1920, and 1923–1924 sessions. She was inducted into the Arizona Women's Hall of Fame in 2019.

== Early life ==
Rosa Jane Lyons was born in Idaho Springs, Colorado, the daughter of John Lyons and Sarah Ratliff Lyons. She was raised by her widowed mother and an older sister.

== Career ==
McKay first ran for a seat in the Arizona state legislature in 1915. She was elected to an assembly seat in 1916, and served three terms; she represented Cochise County in the 1917–1918 session, and Gila County in the 1919–1920 and 1923–1924 sessions. While in office, she successfully introduced a bill for a "woman's minimum wage", actively opposed the Bisbee Deportation, criticized large mining companies including Phelps Dodge, and sued a newspaper for libel. In 1919, her name was mentioned as a dark horse possibility for speaker of the Arizona House of Representatives. In 1920, she was one of the four women to introduce the resolution for Arizona to ratify the Nineteenth Amendment, and she was considered a possible candidate for the state senate.

Outside of her elected office, McKay was active in the Business and Professional Women's Club in Phoenix. She served on the Board of Visitors for the Tempe Normal School (now Arizona State University), and held a seat on the Child Welfare Board. "I belong to no labor organization or mining corporation", she wrote in an essay about the Bisbee Deportation for Appeal to Reason in 1917; "I am merely an onlooker and spectator, and a firm believer in the constitutional rights of all American citizens, whether by birth or naturalization, the rights that our forefathers fought, bled, and died for," she explained.

== Personal life and legacy ==
Rosa Lyons married twice. Her first husband, Andrew J. Malcolm, was a miner; they married in 1897, and he died in 1904. She married another miner, Hugh McKay, in 1912. She died in 1934, in Phoenix, Arizona, aged 53 years. In 2019, she was posthumously inducted into the Arizona Women's Hall of Fame.
