= W. D. Claypool =

American politician from Arizona

Member of the Arizona House of Representatives from the Gila County
- In office January 1915 – December 1916
- Preceded by: J. Tom Lewis; John W. Murphy
- Succeeded by: C. C. Faires; H. C. Houser; John McCormick

Member of the Arizona Senate from the Gila County district
- In office January 1917 – December 1924
- Preceded by: John E. Bacon
- Succeeded by: John R. Lyons

Personal details
- Party: Democratic
- Profession: Politician

William D. Claypool was an Arizona politician who served several terms in the Arizona State Senate during the 1910s and 1920s.

== Biography ==
Claypool was originally from Kentucky, where he graduated from Ogden College. He served with U. S. forces during the Spanish-American War, seeing action in Cuba. Shortly after the war he moved to Arizona. In Arizona, Claypool was a resident of Claypool, which he founded and was named after him. In 1897 he was appointed as the deputy sheriff of Gila County. In 1902 he decided to run for sheriff, but then withdrew from the race.

In 1914 he was nominated by the Democrats for one of the three seats in the Arizona House of Representatives from Gila County. All three Democrats won in November's general election which was a landslide victory for the Democrats who won every seat in the Senate and all but one seat in the House. Claypool did not run for re-election in 1916, instead he ran for and won one of the two State Senate seats from Gila County, running alongside incumbent Alfred Kinney, who also won. He was re-elected to the senate in 1918, and again in 1920. During the 5th Arizona State Legislature, he was nominated by the Democrats to be the President of the Senate, but the Senate was controlled by a 10-9 Republican majority, so H. B. Wilkinson, a Republican from Maricopa County was elected. In 1922 both Democrat incumbents, Claypool and F. A. Woodward ran for re-election. However, Alfred Kinney, who had served in the first three Arizona senates, also ran. Claypool and Kinney won the Democrat's nomination, and both were elected in the November general election.

In 1924, Claypool did not run for re-election. He chose to throw his hat into the ring for State Corporation Commissioner. In the Democrat's primary, he had a hotly contested race against Scott White. Early returns on September 10 had White up by just under 500 votes, but that margin closed over the next several days, until by the 16th White's lead had shrunk to 25. Finally, on the 17th, Claypool was declared the winner with a lead of over 170 votes. In the November general election he defeated Republican C. E. Beach by over 2,000 votes, and took office on January 5, 1925. In January 1927, Claypool was elected chairman of the commission for a two-year term. He announced his intention to run for re-elect to the State Board again in June 1931, but was defeated in the Democrat's primary by Charles R. Howe.

In 1932, Claypool ran once again for the State Senate, however he was defeated by incumbent E,. H. McEachren and newcomer John P. Dougherty in the primary.
