= List of speakers of the Arizona House of Representatives =

Speaker of Arizona House of Representatives

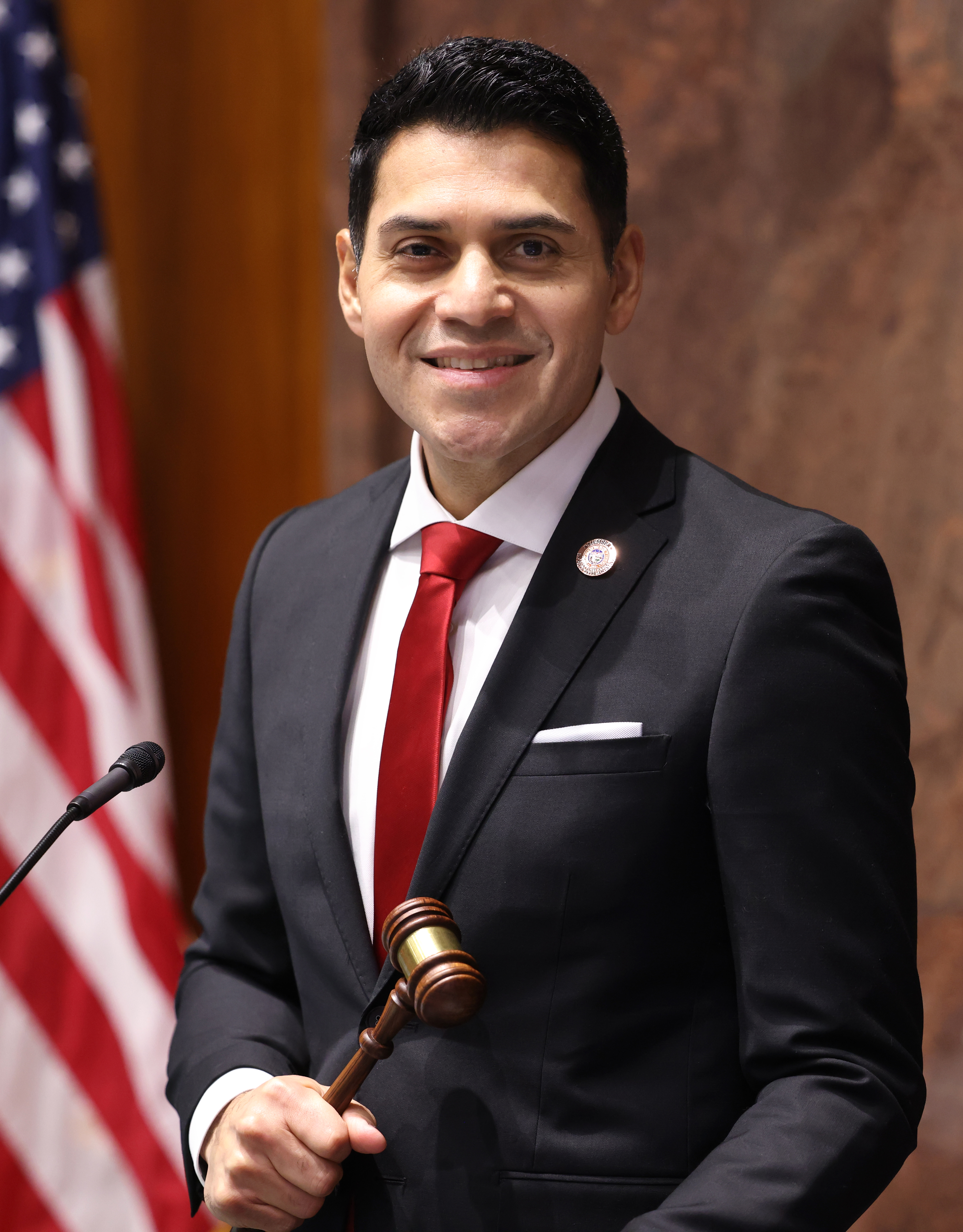
- Incumbent; Steve Montenegro since January 13, 2025
- Status: Presiding officer
- Seat: Arizona State Capitol, Phoenix
- Appointer: Arizona House of Representatives
- Term length: Two years
- Inaugural holder: Samuel B. Bradner

The following is a list of speakers of the Arizona House of Representatives since statehood.

== Speakers of the Arizona House of Representatives ==
Speaker	Term	Party	County/Residence	Notes	Citation
Samuel B. Bradner	1912–1915	Democratic	Cochise		
William Eugene Brooks	1915–1917	Democratic	Gila		
Anthony A. Johns	1917–1919	Democratic	Yavapai		
Andrew C. Peterson	1919–1921	Democratic	Graham		
Paul C. Keefe	1921–1923	Democratic	Yavapai		
Daniel P. Jones	1923–1925	Democratic	Maricopa		
Charles E. MacMillin	1925–1927	Democratic	Pinal		
Albert M. Crawford	1927–1929	Democratic	Yavapai		
M. J. Hannon	1929–1933	Democratic	Greenlee		
Stephen A. Spear	1933–1935	Democratic	Yavapai		
William G. Rosenbaum	1934–1935	Democratic	Gila		
Thomas D. Tway	1935–1936	Democratic	Maricopa		
Edward F. Bohlinger	1936–1937	Democratic	Santa Cruz		
Vernon G. Davis	1937–1938	Democratic	Cochise		
Frank W. Sharpe Jr.	1938–1939	Democratic	Cochise		
Melvin Goodson	1939–1940	Democratic	Maricopa		
William Spaid	1940–1941	Democratic	Pima		
James R. Heron	1941–1942	Democratic	Gila		
O. L. McDaniel	1943–1945	Democratic	Maricopa		
Fred J. Fritz	1945–1947	Democratic	Greenlee		
Edward L. Jameson	1947–1949	Democratic	Mohave		
Raymond G. Langham	1949–1953	Democratic	Gila		
John C. Smith Jr.	1953–1955	Democratic	Yuma		
Harry S. Rupelius	1955–1957	Democratic	Maricopa		
W. L. Cook	1957–1963	Democratic	Cochise		
Wilbur B. Barkley	1963–1965	Democratic	Maricopa		
Andrew J. Gilbert	1965–1967	Democratic	Cochise		
Stan Turley	1967–1969	Republican	Maricopa		
John H. Haugh	1969–1971	Republican	Pima		
Timothy A. Barrow	1971–1973	Republican	Maricopa		
Stanley W. Akers	1973–1977	Republican	Maricopa		
Frank Kelley	1977–1985	Republican	Maricopa		
James J. Sossaman	1985–1987	Republican	Maricopa		
Joe Lane	1987–1989	Republican	Cochise		
Jane Dee Hull	1989–1993	Republican	Maricopa		
Mark Killian	1993–1997	Republican	Maricopa		
Donald R. Aldridge	1997	Republican	Mohave		
Jeff Groscost	1997–2001	Republican	Maricopa		
James Weiers	2001–2003	Republican	Maricopa		
Jake Flake	2003–2005	Republican	Navajo		
James Weiers	2005–2009	Republican	Maricopa		
Kirk Adams	2009–2011	Republican	Maricopa		
Andy Tobin	2011–2015	Republican	Yavapai		
David Gowan	2015–2017	Republican	Cochise		
J. D. Mesnard	2017–2019	Republican	Maricopa		
Russell Bowers	2019–2023	Republican	Maricopa		
Ben Toma	2023–2025	Republican	Maricopa		
Steve Montenegro	2025–	Republican	Maricopa		

== Speakers of the Arizona Territorial House of Representatives ==
Speaker	Term	Party	County/Residence	Notes	Citation
W. Claude Jones	1864		Pima		
James S. Giles	1865		Yavapai		
Granville H. Oury	1866		Pima		
Oliver Lindsey	1867		Yuma		
Thomas J. Bidwell	1868		Yuma		
Marcus D. Dobbins	1871		Yuma		
Granville H. Oury	1873		Maricopa		
John T. Alsap	1875		Maricopa		
M. H. Calderwood	1877		Maricopa		
Madison W. Stewart	1879		Pima		
J. F. Knapp	1881		Yuma		
Winthorp A. Rowe	1883		Yavapai		
H. G. Rollins	1885		Pima		
Sam F. Webb	1887	Democratic	Maricopa		
John Y. T. Smith	1889		Maricopa		
C. S. Clark	1891		Cochise		
Frank Baxter	1893		Maricopa		
J. H. Carpenter	1895		Yuma		
D. G. Chalmers	1897		Pima		
Henry F. Ashurst	1899	Democratic	Coconino		
Prosper P. Parker	1901	Democratic	Yavapai		
Theodore T. Powers	1903		Maricopa		
Wilfred T. Webb	1905	Democratic	Graham		
Neil E. Bailey	1907		Cochise		
Sam F. Webb	1909	Democratic	Maricopa		

== See also ==
- List of Arizona state legislatures
