= Mulford Winsor =

American newspaperman and politician (1874–1956)

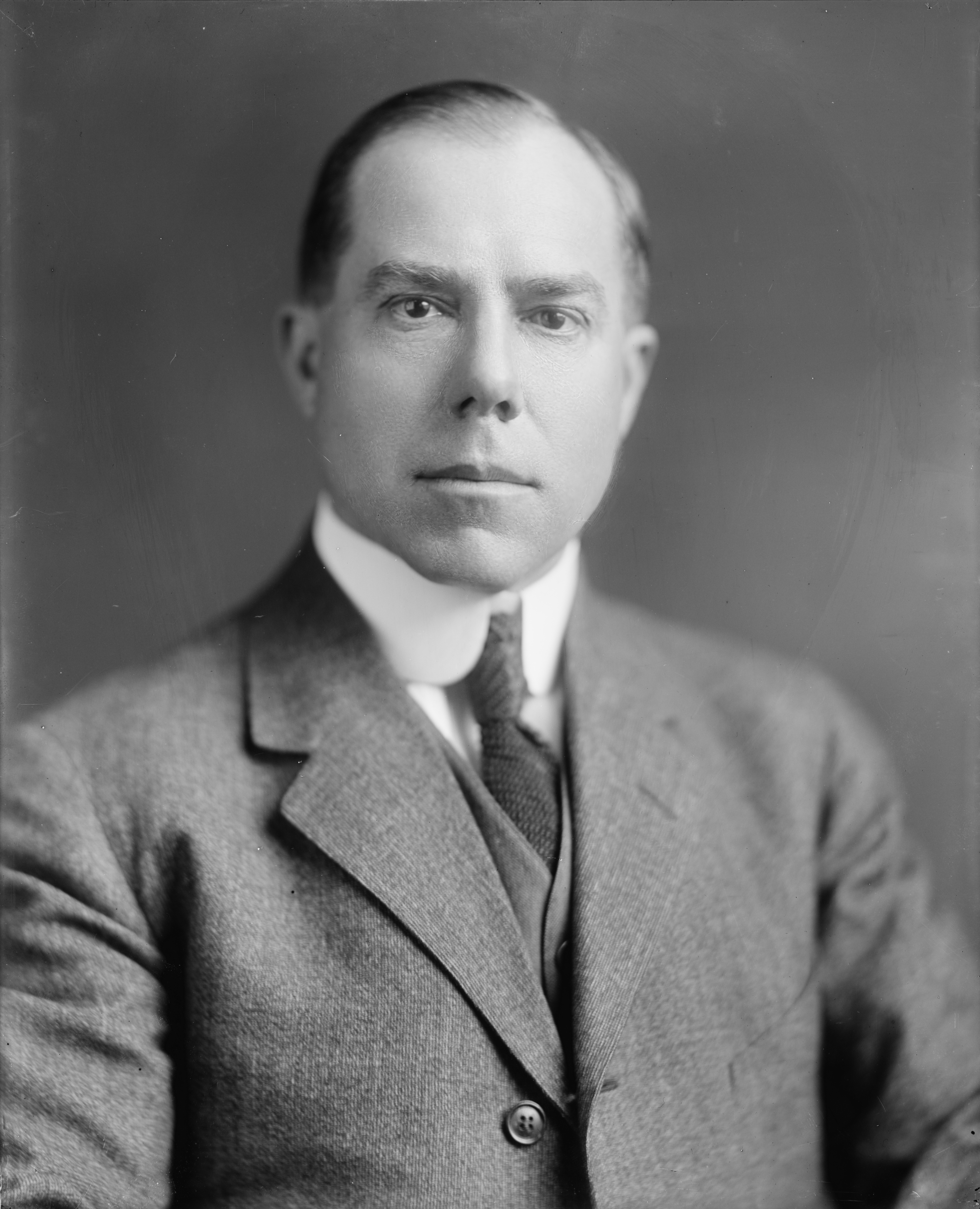
- Mulford Winsor c. 1918

Member of the Arizona State Senate from the Yuma County district
- In office January 1916 – January 1920
- In office January 1922 – January 1928

President of the Arizona State Senate
- In office 1923–1928

Personal details
- Born: May 31, 1874 Jewell, Kansas
- Died: November 5, 1956 (aged 82) Phoenix, Arizona
- Party: Democratic
- Spouse: Clarissa
- Occupation: Newspaperman

Mulford Winsor (May 31, 1874 – November 5, 1956) was an American newspaperman and politician active in Arizona.

== Background ==
Winsor was born in Jewell, Kansas on May 31, 1874. His father, editor of the Jewell City Republican, began teaching him the newspaper business when he was seven years old. His family moved to Fort Smith, Arkansas in 1885 where Winsor attended high school and became a journeyman printer.

In 1892, Winsor relocated to Prescott, Arizona Territory. Over the next two years he moved around the territory, working at a variety of newspapers, before settling in Yuma. There, in 1896, he founded the Yuma Sun. The same year he began farming dates. He maintained his farming interests until his death although many years he hired others to oversee his operations.

Upon his arrival in Arizona, Winsor became active in the Democratic party and an outspoken advocate of progressive politics. In 1900, he became County Assessor of Yuma County. The next year he served as Assistant Chief Clerk of the Territorial House of Representatives for the 21st Arizona Territorial Legislature, a position he later served during the 23rd Arizona Territorial Legislature. In 1901 he also moved to Tucson and became copublisher of the Tucson Citizen. Winsor left for Phoenix in 1903 where he worked at the Phoenix Enterprise. In 1905, Winsor returned to Yuma and founded the Morning Sun. Two years later he moved to Globe where he edited the Daily Globe until July 1910. While at the Daily Globe, Winsor wrote the first editorials in the territory supporting initiative, referendum and reform.

In 1909, Winsor was Acting Secretary of the Territorial Council during the 25th Arizona Territorial Legislature. During the session he proposed the legislature create the office of territorial historian. Following passage of the legislation, in March 1909, he was appointed to be the first territorial historian by Governor Joseph Henry Kibbey.

Winsor was elected to represent Yuma County in Arizona's 1910 constitutional convention. During the convention he was selected to be Chairman of the Committee on Legislative Departments. Additionally he assisted the Committee on Style, Revision, and Compilation with the final wording of the produced document. During a 1911 special election, Winsor ran for Arizona's upcoming seat in the U.S. House of Representatives but lost to Carl Hayden during the primary election. After Arizona achieved statehood in 1912, Winsor served briefly as secretary to Governor George W. P. Hunt before being appointed Chairman of the State Land Commission.

In 1915, Winsor was elected to represent Yuma County in the Arizona State Senate. He served two two-year terms before making an unsuccessful run to be elected governor in 1920. Winsor returned to the Arizona State Senate in 1922, serving three more terms. During his final five years in the legislature, from 1923 to 1928, he served as President of the Senate. During his time in the Senate he gained a reputation as one of Arizona's most important and influential lawmakers. One of the issues of greatest concern to Winsor was apportionment of water from the Colorado River. Toward this concern he was appointed to the Arizona Colorado River Commission from 1927 to 1928.

After leaving the legislature, Winsor was appointed State Librarian and Director of the Department of Library and Archives in 1932. He held that position until his death in Phoenix on November 5, 1956. Winsor was buried in Yuma.
