= 21st Arizona State Legislature =

Session of the Arizona Legislature

←	20th	22nd	→
- Arizona State Capitol (2014)

Overview
- Legislative body: Arizona State Legislature
- Jurisdiction: Arizona, United States
- Term: January 1, 1953 – December 31, 1954

Senate
- Members: 19
- Party control: Democratic (15–4)

House of Representatives
- Members: 80
- Party control: Democratic (50–30)

Sessions
- 1st: January 12 – March 31, 1953
- 2nd: January 11 – April 10, 1954

Special sessions
- 1st: October 13 – November 3, 1953

The 21st Arizona State Legislature, consisting of the Arizona State Senate and the Arizona House of Representatives, was constituted in Phoenix from January 1, 1953, to December 31, 1954, during the last two years of John Howard Pyle's term as Governor of Arizona. The number of senators remained constant at 19, while the members of the house of representatives increased from 68 to 80. The Republicans picked up four Senate seats, leaving the Democrats in control of the upper house with a 15–4 margin. In the House, the Republicans picked up nineteen seats, while the number of seats controlled by the Democrats decreased by seven, giving the Democrats a 50–30 edge.

== Sessions ==
The Legislature met for two regular sessions at the State Capitol in Phoenix. The first opened on January 12, 1953; and adjourned on March 31, while the second convened on January 11, 1954, and adjourned on April 10. The only special session was convened on October 13, 1953, and adjourned sine die on November 3, 1953.

== State Senate ==
=== Members ===
The asterisk (*) denotes members of the previous Legislature who continued in office as members of this Legislature.

County	Senator	Party	Notes
Apache	Bryant Whiting	Republican	
Cochise	Alfred Paul Jr.	Democrat	
Cochise	A. R. Spikes	Democrat	
Coconino	Robert W. Prochnow	Democrat	
Gila	Clarence L. Carpenter*	Democrat	
Gila	William A. Sullivan*	Democrat	
Graham	Jim Smith	Democrat	
Greenlee	A. C. Stanton*	Democrat	
Maricopa	O.D. Miller	Republican	
Maricopa	William R. Pyper	Republican	
Mohave	Earl W. Cooke	Democrat	
Navajo	Clay Simer*	Democrat	
Pima	James W. Ewing**	Republican	
Pima	H. S. Corbett**	Republican	
Pima	William Kimball*	Democrat	
Pinal	James Herron Jr.*	Democrat	
Santa Cruz	Hubert 0. Merryweather*	Democrat	
Yavapai	Kel M. Fox	Democrat	
Yavapai	Charles H. Orme Sr.	Democrat	
Yuma	Harold C. Giss*	Democrat	

** James W. Ewing died in office and was replaced by H. S. Corbett

== House of Representatives ==
=== Members ===
The asterisk (*) denotes members of the previous Legislature who continued in office as members of this Legislature.

County	Representative	Party	Notes
Apache	Lorin M. Farr	Republican	
Cochise	Evelyn Anderson	Democrat	
Cochise	Charles O. Bloomquist*	Democrat	
Cochise	W. L. Cook*	Democrat	
Cochise	Fred Dove	Democrat	
Cochise	H. J. Lewis	Democrat	
Coconino	John W. Stilley	Republican	
Coconino	Harry F. Sutherland*	Republican	
Gila	Charles Horne*	Democrat	
Gila	Louis B. Ellsworth Jr.	Democrat	
Gila	Edwynne C. "Polly" Rosenbaum*	Democrat	
Graham	Milton Lines*	Democrat	
Graham	E. L. Tidwell	Democrat	
Greenlee	M. L. Simms*	Democrat	
Maricopa	L. S. Adams Jr*	Democrat	
Maricopa	Ruth Adams	Republican	
Maricopa	Elijah Allen**	Republican	
Maricopa	Clint Anderson*	Democrat	
Maricopa	H. C. Armstrong*	Democrat	
Maricopa	D. F. Benson	Democrat	
Maricopa	Robert Brewer	Republican	
Maricopa	Isabel Burgess	Republican	
Maricopa	L. Max Connolly*	Democrat	
Maricopa	Jack Cummard*	Democrat	
Maricopa	Sherman R. Dent	Democrat	
Maricopa	Mary Dwyer*	Democrat	
Maricopa	Ed Ellsworth*	Democrat	
Maricopa	W. W. Franklin*	Democrat	
Maricopa	Clara S. Haberl	Republican	
Maricopa	Jack Hays	Republican	
Maricopa	Walter Hirsch	Republican	
Maricopa	Sam Joy	Republican	
Maricopa	Owen A. Kane*	Democrat	
Maricopa	Sidney Kartus*	Democrat	
Maricopa	Richard G. Kleindienst	Republican	
Maricopa	Ruth C. Kuntz	Republican	
Maricopa	Norman S. Lee	Democrat	
Maricopa	C. H. Marion	Republican	
Maricopa	Laura McRae*	Democrat	
Maricopa	Robert L. Myers*	Republican	
Maricopa	William S. Porter**	Republican	
Maricopa	T. C. Rhodes*	Democrat	
Maricopa	W. H. Ridgeway	Democrat	
Maricopa	Harry S. Ruppelius*	Democrat	
Maricopa	Carl Sims Sr.*	Democrat	
Maricopa	J. P. Stump	Democrat	
Maricopa	Harold W. Tshudy	Republican	
Maricopa	Derek Van Dyke*	Republican	
Maricopa	R. H. Wallace*	Republican	
Maricopa	Hal Warner	Democrat	
Maricopa	Robert E. Wilson*	Democrat	
Maricopa	William Younger Wood	Democrat	
Mohave	Robert E. Morrow*	Democrat	
Navajo	Lee F. Dover	Democrat	
Navajo	Wallace H. Larson*	Republican	
Pima	Harold Burton	Republican	
Pima	Oscar C. Cole*	Democrat	
Pima	John H. Haugh	Republican	
Pima	Douglas S. Holsclaw	Republican	
Pima	V. S. Hostetter*	Republican	
Pima	Norval W. Jasper	Republican	
Pima	David F. Lindsay	Democrat	
Pima	John W. Mcinnes	Republican	
Pima	Frank G. Robles*	Democrat	
Pima	William K. Ruchey	Republican	
Pima	Enos P. Schaffer*	Democrat	
Pima	David G. Watkins*	Democrat	
Pima	Alvin Wessler*	Republican	
Pima	Julliette C. Willis*	Republican	
Pima	Larry Woods	Democrat	Larry Woods resigned and was replaced by Etta Mae Huchinson on October 20, 1953
Pinal	A. L. Bartlett*	Democrat	
Pinal	J. Ney Miles*	Democrat	
Pinal	E. Blodwen Thode	Democrat	
Santa Cruz	Neilson Brown*	Democrat	
Yavapai	A. H. Bisjak*	Democrat	
Yavapai	Walter F. Edwards	Republican	
Yavapai	Dick W. Martin*	Republican	
Yavapai	Henry Rush*	Democrat	
Yuma	Robert Hodge	Democrat	
Yuma	E. C. Johnson	Democrat	
Yuma	John C. Smith Jr.	Democrat	

The ** means that Elijah Allen died in office and was replaced by William S. Porter
