= 20th Arizona State Legislature =

Session of the Arizona Legislature

←	19th	21st	→
- Arizona State Capitol (2014)

Overview
- Legislative body: Arizona State Legislature
- Jurisdiction: Arizona, United States
- Term: January 1, 1951 – December 31, 1952

Senate
- Members: 19
- Party control: Democratic (19–0)

House of Representatives
- Members: 68
- Party control: Democratic (57–11)

Sessions
- 1st: January 8 – March 18, 1951
- 2nd: January 14 – March 27, 1952

Special sessions
- 1st: June 25 – June 29, 1951
- 2nd: July 30 – August 1, 1952

The 20th Arizona State Legislature, consisting of the Arizona State Senate and the Arizona House of Representatives, was constituted in Phoenix from January 1, 1951, to December 31, 1952, during the first two years of John Howard Pyle's term as Governor of Arizona. The number of senators remained constant at 19, while the members of the house of representatives increased from 58 to 68. The Democrats controlled one hundred percent of the senate, while in the house the Democrats increased six seats and the Republicans gained four seats, giving the Democrats a 57–11 edge.

== Sessions ==
The Legislature met for two regular sessions at the State Capitol in Phoenix. The first opened on January 8, 1951; and adjourned on March 18, while the second convened on January 14, 1952, and adjourned on March 27. There were two special sessions: the first convened on June 25, 1951, and adjourned sine die on June 29, 1951; while the second convened on July 30, 1952, and adjourned sine die on August 1, 1952.

== State Senate ==
=== Members ===
The asterisk (*) denotes members of the previous Legislature who continued in office as members of this Legislature.

County	Senator	Party	Notes
Apache	Harris R. Miller	Democrat	
Cochise	Ralph C. Cowan	Democrat	
Cochise	John Pintek*	Democrat	
Coconino	Charles W. Dryden	Democrat	
Gila	Clarence L. Carpenter*	Democrat	
Gila	William A. Sullivan*	Democrat	
Graham	Warner B. Mattice*	Democrat	
Greenlee	A. C. Stanton	Democrat	
Maricopa	John E. Hunt*	Democrat	
Maricopa	Roy D. Stone*	Democrat	
Mohave	Clyde Bollinger*	Democrat	
Navajo	Clay Simer*	Democrat	
Pima	Thomas Collins	Democrat	
Pima	William Kimball*	Democrat	
Pinal	James Herron Jr.*	Democrat	
Santa Cruz	Hubert 0. Merryweather*	Democrat	
Yavapai	Sam J. Head*	Democrat	
Yavapai	John R. Franks*	Democrat	
Yuma	Harold C. Giss	Democrat	

== House of Representatives ==
=== Members ===
The asterisk (*) denotes members of the previous Legislature who continued in office as members of this Legislature.

County	Representative	Party	Notes
Apache	Walter Pulsipher	Democrat	
Cochise	Wesley T. Allen*	Democrat	
Cochise	Charles O. Bloomquist	Democrat	
Cochise	W. L. Cook*	Democrat	
Cochise	Carl W. Morris*	Democrat	
Cochise	Alfred Paul Jr.*	Democrat	
Coconino	Gordon Evans	Democrat	
Coconino	Harry F. Sutherland	Republican	
Gila	Charles Horne	Democrat	
Gila	Raymond G. Langham*	Democrat	
Gila	Mrs. William G. Rosenbaum*	Democrat	
Graham	Milton Lines*	Democrat	
Graham	W. A. McBride*	Democrat	
Greenlee	M. L. Simms*	Democrat	
Maricopa	Lee Ackerman	Democrat	
Maricopa	L. S. Adams, Jr	Democrat	
Maricopa	Clint Anderson	Democrat	
Maricopa	H. C. Armstrong*	Democrat	
Maricopa	W. B. Barkley	Democrat	
Maricopa	Lewis R. Burch*	Democrat	
Maricopa	Francis J. Byrnes	Democrat	
Maricopa	L. Max Connolly*	Democrat	
Maricopa	W. E. Craig*	Democrat	
Maricopa	Jack Cummard*	Democrat	
Maricopa	H. B. Daniels	Democrat	
Maricopa	Mary Dwyer	Democrat	
Maricopa	Ed Ellsworth*	Democrat	
Maricopa	W. C. Estes	Democrat	
Maricopa	W. W. Franklin*	Democrat	
Maricopa	J. Blaine Freestone	Democrat	
Maricopa	Gordon Hunt	Republican	
Maricopa	Owen A. Kane	Democrat	
Maricopa	Sidney Kartus*	Democrat	
Maricopa	Al Lindsey	Democrat	
Maricopa	Laura McRae*	Democrat	
Maricopa	Robert L. Myers	Republican	
Maricopa	T. C. Rhodes	Democrat	
Maricopa	Harry S. Ruppelius	Democrat	
Maricopa	Carl Sims Sr.	Democrat	
Maricopa	Derek Van Dyke	Republican	
Maricopa	R. H. Wallace*	Republican	
Maricopa	Ronald Webster Jr.*	Republican	
Maricopa	Paul J. West	Democrat	
Maricopa	B. T. Wilkinson	Democrat	
Maricopa	Robert E. Wilson	Democrat	
Mohave	Robert E. Morrow*	Democrat	
Navajo	Lee Kutch	Democrat	
Navajo	L. E. Stone*	Democrat	
Pima	Marvin L. Burton*	Democrat	
Pima	Oscar C. Cole*	Democrat	
Pima	James W. Ewing*	Republican	
Pima	Robert H. Forbes*	Democrat	
Pima	Robert H. Frick	Democrat	
Pima	John S. Hardwicke*	Democrat	
Pima	V. S. Hostetter*	Republican	
Pima	Roy Martin*	Democrat	
Pima	Paul J. Riley	Democrat	
Pima	Frank G. Robles*	Democrat	
Pima	Enos P. Schaffer	Democrat	
Pima	David G. Watkins	Democrat	
Pima	Alvin Wessler	Republican	
Pima	Julliette C. Willis	Republican	
Pinal	A. L. Bartlett*	Democrat	
Pinal	J. Ney Miles	Democrat	
Santa Cruz	Neilson Brown*	Democrat	
Yavapai	A. H. Bisjak*	Democrat	
Yavapai	Kel M. Fox*	Democrat	
Yavapai	Dick W. Martin*	Republican	
Yavapai	Henry Rush*	Democrat	
Yuma	Robert Hodge	Democrat	
Yuma	E. C. Johnson	Democrat	
Yuma	John C. Smith Jr.	Democrat	
