= 19th Arizona State Legislature =

Session of the Arizona Legislature

| ← | 18th | 20th | → |
- Arizona State Capitol (2014)

Overview
- Legislative body: Arizona State Legislature
- Jurisdiction: Arizona, United States
- Term: January 1, 1949 – December 31, 1950

Senate
- Members: 19
- Party control: Democratic (19–0)

House of Representatives
- Members: 58
- Party control: Democratic (51–7)

Sessions
- 1st: January 10 – March 19, 1949

Special sessions
- 1st: February 20 – March 19, 1950
- 2nd: April 10 – April 15, 1950

The 19th Arizona State Legislature, consisting of the Arizona State Senate and the Arizona House of Representatives, was constituted in Phoenix from January 1, 1949, to December 31, 1950, during the first year of Dan Edward Garvey's first full term as Governor of Arizona. The number of senators and house members remained constant at 19 and 58, respectively. The Democrats controlled one hundred percent of the senate, while the Republicans gained two house seats, to a total of seven.

== Sessions ==
The Legislature met for the regular session at the State Capitol in Phoenix on January 10, 1949; and adjourned on March 19. There were two special sessions: the first convened on February 20, 1950, and adjourned sine die on March 19, 1950; while the second convened on April 10, 1950, and adjourned sine die on April 15, 1950.

== State Senate ==
=== Members ===
The asterisk (*) denotes members of the previous Legislature who continued in office as members of this Legislature.

| County | Senator | Party | Notes |
|---|---|---|---|
| Apache | Earl Platt* | Democrat | |
| Cochise | Ralph Cowan* | Democrat | |
| Cochise | John Pintek | Democrat | |
| Coconino | F. L. Christensen | Democrat | |
| Gila | Clarence L. Carpenter | Democrat | |
| Gila | William A. Sullivan | Democrat | |
| Graham | Warner B. Mattice | Democrat | |
| Greenlee | Fred J. Fritz* | Democrat | |
| Maricopa | John E. Hunt | Democrat | |
| Maricopa | Roy D. Stone | Democrat | |
| Mohave | Clyde Bollinger | Democrat | |
| Navajo | Clay Simer | Democrat | |
| Pima | J. B. Mead | Democrat | |
| Pima | William Kimball* | Democrat | |
| Pinal | James Herron Jr. | Democrat | |
| Santa Cruz | Hubert 0. Merryweather | Democrat | |
| Yavapai | Sam J. Head* | Democrat | |
| Yavapai | John R. Franks | Democrat | |
| Yuma | Joseph D. Mansfield | Democrat | |

== House of Representatives ==
=== Members ===
The asterisk (*) denotes members of the previous Legislature who continued in office as members of this Legislature.

| County | Representative | Party | Notes |
|---|---|---|---|
| Apache | George E. Crosby | Democrat | |
| Cochise | Wesley T. Allen | Democrat | |
| Cochise | Carl W. Morris* | Democrat | |
| Cochise | Alfred Paul Jr. | Democrat | |
| Cochise | James A. Elliott | Democrat | |
| Cochise | W. L. Cook | Democrat | |
| Coconino | Charles W. Dryden | Democrat | |
| Coconino | Jesse L. Boyce* | Democrat | |
| Gila | Raymond G. Langham* | Democrat | |
| Gila | Mrs. William G. Rosenbaum | Democrat | |
| Gila | Harold Copp* | Democrat | |
| Graham | W. A. McBride* | Democrat | |
| Graham | Milton Lines* | Democrat | |
| Greenlee | M. L. Simms | Democrat | |
| Maricopa | R.S. Hart* | Democrat | |
| Maricopa | Wing F. Ong* | Democrat | |
| Maricopa | Fletcher W. Timmerman* | Democrat | |
| Maricopa | G. N. Baker* | Democrat | |
| Maricopa | Jack Cummard* | Democrat | |
| Maricopa | William B. O'Malley | Democrat | |
| Maricopa | Ed Ellsworth | Democrat | |
| Maricopa | L. Max Connolly* | Democrat | |
| Maricopa | John H. Wilson | Democrat | |
| Maricopa | Sidney Kartus* | Democrat | |
| Maricopa | J. M. Combs* | Democrat | |
| Maricopa | J. H. Callan | Democrat | |
| Maricopa | W. E. Craig* | Democrat | |
| Maricopa | Ronald Webster | Republican | |
| Maricopa | R. H. Wallace* | Republican | |
| Maricopa | Laura McRae* | Democrat | |
| Maricopa | J. W. Estes | Democrat | |
| Maricopa | Harry Wimberly* | Democrat | |
| Maricopa | Charles H. Abels | Democrat | |
| Maricopa | Robert C. Bohannan Jr. | Republican | |
| Maricopa | Lewis R. Burch | Democrat | |
| Maricopa | H. C. Armstrong* | Democrat | |
| Maricopa | W. W. Franklin* | Democrat | |
| Mohave | Robert E. Morrow | Democrat | |
| Navajo | Eva O. Decker* | Republican | |
| Navajo | L. E. Stone | Democrat | |
| Pima | Oscar C. Cole* | Democrat | |
| Pima | Oliver M. Heflin | Democrat | |
| Pima | Frank G. Robles* | Democrat | |
| Pima | Roy Martin* | Democrat | |
| Pima | John S. Hardwicke* | Democrat | |
| Pima | Marvin L. Burton | Democrat | |
| Pima | Robert H. Forbes* | Democrat | |
| Pima | James W. Ewing* | Republican | |
| Pima | V. S. Hostetter* | Republican | |
| Pinal | A. L. Bartlett | Democrat | |
| Pinal | George Ernst* | Democrat | |
| Santa Cruz | Neilson Brown | Democrat | |
| Yavapai | Henry Rush | Democrat | |
| Yavapai | Dick W. Martin* | Republican | |
| Yavapai | Kel M. Fox* | Democrat | |
| Yavapai | A. H. Bisjak | Democrat | |
| Yuma | Clara Osborne Botzum* | Democrat | |
| Yuma | Harold C. Giss | Democrat | |
