= 1950 Arizona Senate election =

- November 7, 1950

All 19 seats in the Arizona Senate 10 seats needed for a majority

	Majority party	Minority party
Party	Democratic	Republican
Last election	19	0
Seats after	19	0
Seat change	Steady	Steady
President before election
Warner B. Mattice
Democratic
Elected President
Warner B. Mattice
Democratic

The 1950 Arizona Senate election was held on November 7, 1950, to determine which party would control the Arizona Senate for the following two years in the 20th Arizona State Legislature. All 19 seats in the Arizona Senate were up for election. Prior to the election, all seats were held by Democrats. The general election saw Democrats retain all seats in the State Senate.

== Results ==
District	Incumbent	Party	Elected Senator	Party	Result
Apache	Earl Platt	Dem	Harris R. Miller	Dem	Democratic hold
Cochise	Ralph Cowan	Dem	Ralph Cowan	Dem	Democratic hold
Cochise	John Pintek	Dem	John Pintek	Dem	Democratic hold
Coconino	F. L. Christensen	Dem	Charles W. Dryden	Dem	Democratic hold
Gila	Clarence L. Carpenter	Dem	Clarence L. Carpenter	Dem	Democratic hold
Gila	William A. Sullivan	Dem	William A. Sullivan	Dem	Democratic hold
Graham	Warner B. Mattice	Dem	Warner B. Mattice	Dem	Democratic hold
Greenlee	Fred J. Fritz	Dem	A. C. Stanton	Dem	Democratic hold
Maricopa	John E. Hunt	Dem	John E. Hunt	Dem	Democratic hold
Maricopa	Roy D. Stone	Dem	Roy D. Stone	Dem	Democratic hold
Mohave	Clyde Bollinger	Dem	Clyde Bollinger	Dem	Democratic hold
Navajo	Clay Simer	Dem	Clay Simer	Dem	Democratic hold
Pima	J. B. Mead	Dem	Thomas Collins	Dem	Democratic hold
Pima	William Kimball	Dem	William Kimball	Dem	Democratic hold
Pinal	James Herron Jr.	Dem	James Herron Jr.	Dem	Democratic hold
Santa Cruz	Hubert O. Merryweather	Dem	Hubert O. Merryweather	Dem	Democratic hold
Yavapai	Sam J. Head	Dem	Sam J. Head	Dem	Democratic hold
Yavapai	John R. Franks	Dem	John R. Franks	Dem	Democratic hold
Yuma	Joseph D. Mansfield	Dem	Harold C. Giss	Dem	Democratic hold
