= 18th Arizona State Legislature =

Session of the Arizona Legislature

←	17th	19th	→
- Arizona State Capitol (2014)

Overview
- Legislative body: Arizona State Legislature
- Jurisdiction: Arizona, United States
- Term: January 1, 1947 – December 31, 1948

Senate
- Members: 19
- Party control: Democratic (19–0)

House of Representatives
- Members: 58
- Party control: Democratic (53–5)

Sessions
- 1st: January 13 – March 20, 1947

Special sessions
- 1st: June 9 – June 23, 1947
- 2nd: June 18 – July 1, 1947
- 3rd: January 5 – January 21, 1948
- 4th: January 22 – February 17, 1948
- 5th: February 18 – February 25, 1948
- 6th: March 12 – March 25, 1948
- 7th: September 13 – October 14, 1948

The 18th Arizona State Legislature, consisting of the Arizona State Senate and the Arizona House of Representatives, was constituted in Phoenix from January 1, 1947 to December 31, 1948, during the fourth of Sidney Preston Osborn's four consecutive terms as Governor of Arizona. The number of senators and house members remained constant at 19 and 58, respectively. The Democrats controlled one hundred percent of the senate. while the Republicans gained four house seats, to a total of five.

== Sessions ==
The Legislature met for the regular session at the State Capitol in Phoenix on January 13, 1947; and adjourned on March 20. There were seven special sessions, the first of which was held from June 9 through June 23, 1947, the second was held from June 18 – July 1, 1947, the third was held between January 5 – 21, 1948, the fourth from January 22- February 17, 1948, the fifth spanned February 18 – March 12, 1948, The sixth was from March 12–25, 1948, and the seventh from September 13 – October 14, 1948.

== State Senate ==
=== Members ===
The asterisk (*) denotes members of the previous Legislature who continued in office as members of this Legislature.

County	Senator	Party	Notes
Apache	Earl Platt	Democratic	
Cochise	Ralph Cowan*	Democratic	
Cochise	Dan Angius*	Democratic	
Coconino	John G. Babbitt	Democratic	
Gila	S. L. Bixby*	Democratic	
Gila	James R. Heron*	Democratic	
Graham	Wesley A. Townsend*	Democratic	
Greenlee	Fred J. Fritz	Democratic	
Maricopa	Marvin E. Smith	Democratic	
Maricopa	O.L. McDaniel	Democratic	
Mohave	Earle W. Cook	Democratic	
Navajo	Lloyd C. Henning*	Democratic	
Pima	H. H. d'Autremont*	Democratic	
Pima	William Kimball*	Democratic	
Pinal	Lloyd E. Canfil	Democratic	
Santa Cruz	W. H. Hathaway*	Democratic	
Yavapai	A. L. Favour	Democratic	
Yavapai	Sam J. Head	Democratic	
Yuma	Hugo B. Farmer*	Democratic	

== House of Representatives ==
=== Members ===
The asterisk (*) denotes members of the previous Legislature who continued in office as members of this Legislature.

County	Representative	Party	Notes
Apache	Walter Pulsipher	Democratic	
Cochise	I. A. Rosok*	Democratic	
Cochise	Carl W. Morris	Democratic	
Cochise	Leo F. Foster	Democratic	
Cochise	Stuart F. Krentz	Democratic	
Cochise	A. R. Spikes*	Democratic	
Coconino	Frank L. Christensen*	Democratic	
Coconino	Jesse L. Boyce	Democratic	
Gila	Raymond G. Langham	Democratic	
Gila	William G. Rosenbaum*	Democratic	
Gila	Harold Copp*	Democratic	
Graham	W. A. McBride	Democratic	
Graham	Milton Lines	Democratic	
Greenlee	James Boyce Scott	Democratic	
Maricopa	R.S. Hart	Democratic	
Maricopa	H. C. Armstrong*	Democratic	
Maricopa	G. N. Baker*	Democratic	
Maricopa	Wing F. Ong	Democratic	
Maricopa	Jack Cummard*	Democratic	
Maricopa	Fletcher W. Timmerman	Democratic	
Maricopa	John E. Hunt	Democratic	
Maricopa	L. Max Connolly	Democratic	
Maricopa	W. R. Palmer	Democratic	
Maricopa	Sidney Kartus*	Democratic	
Maricopa	J. M. Combs	Democratic	
Maricopa	Alvin Lindsey*	Democratic	
Maricopa	W. E. Craig	Democratic	
Maricopa	Thornton Jones	Democratic	
Maricopa	R. H. Wallace	Republican	
Maricopa	Laura McRae*	Democratic	
Maricopa	M. Joe Murphy*	Democratic	
Maricopa	Harry Wimberly	Democratic	
Maricopa	Claire Phelps*	Democratic	
Maricopa	Dwight L. Solomon	Democratic	
Maricopa	R. D. Searles	Democratic	
Maricopa	Lorna E. Lockwood	Democratic	
Maricopa	W. W. Franklin	Democratic	
Mohave	E. L. Jameson*	Democratic	
Navajo	Eva O. Decker	Republican	
Navajo	Clay B. Simer*	Democratic	
Pima	Oscar C. Cole	Democratic	
Pima	Robert H. Forbes*	Democratic	
Pima	Frank G. Robles	Democratic	
Pima	Roy Martin*	Democratic	
Pima	John S. Hardwicke*	Democratic	
Pima	John H. Ayraud*	Democratic	
Pima	James W. Ewing*	Republican	
Pima	Hamilton R. Catlin	Democratic	
Pima	V. S. Hostetter	Republican	
Pinal	Parke T. Gilbert	Democratic	
Pinal	George Ernst*	Democratic	
Santa Cruz	Raymond E. Earhart	Democratic	
Yavapai	Robert E. Perkins*	Democratic	
Yavapai	Dick W. Martin	Republican	
Yavapai	Kel M. Fox	Democratic	
Yavapai	Harry E. Metz*	Democratic	
Yuma	Clara Osborne Botzum*	Democratic	
Yuma	N. S. McCallum	Democratic	
