= 22nd Arizona State Legislature =

Session of the Arizona Legislature

←	21st	23rd	→
- Arizona State Capitol (2014)

Overview
- Legislative body: Arizona State Legislature
- Jurisdiction: Arizona, United States
- Term: January 1, 1955 – December 31, 1956

Senate
- Members: 28
- Party control: Democratic (26–2)

House of Representatives
- Members: 81
- Party control: Democratic (61–20)

Sessions
- 1st: January 10 – April 3, 1955
- 2nd: January 9 – April 14, 1956

Special sessions
- 1st: October 24 – November 28, 1955
- 2nd: November 28 – December 20, 1955
- 3rd: December 20, 1955 – January 7, 1956

The 22nd Arizona State Legislature, consisting of the Arizona State Senate and the Arizona House of Representatives, was constituted in Phoenix from January 1, 1955, to December 31, 1956, during the first of two terms of Ernest McFarland's time as Governor of Arizona. The number of senators was increased to two per county, for a total of 28, while the members of the house of representatives increased from 80 to 81. The Republicans lost two Senate seats, leaving the Democrats in control of the upper house with a 26–2 margin. In the House, the Republicans lost ten seats, while the number of seats controlled by the Democrats increased by eleven, giving the Democrats a 61–20 edge.

== Sessions ==
The Legislature met for two regular sessions at the State Capitol in Phoenix. The first opened on January 10, 1955, and adjourned on April 3; while the second convened on January 9, 1956, and adjourned on April 14. There were three Special Sessions: the first convened on October 4, 1955, and adjourned sine die on November 28; the Second Special Session convened on November 28, 1955, and adjourned sine die on December 20; and the Third Special Session convened on December 20, 1955, and adjourned sine die on January 7, 1956.

== State Senate ==
=== Members ===
The asterisk (*) denotes members of the previous Legislature who continued in office as members of this Legislature.

County	Senator	Party	Notes
Apache	Lynn Lockhart	Democrat	
Apache	Melvin C. Greer	Democrat	
Cochise	Fred Dove	Democrat	
Cochise	A. R. Spikes*	Democrat	
Coconino	Robert W. Prochnow*	Democrat	
Coconino	Fred F. Udine	Democrat	
Gila	Clarence L. Carpenter*	Democrat	
Gila	William A. Sullivan*	Democrat	
Graham	Jim Smith*	Democrat	
Graham	Wilford R. Richardson	Democrat	
Greenlee	M. L. Sims	Democrat	
Greenlee	A. C. Stanton*	Democrat	
Maricopa	Joe Haldiman Jr.	Democrat	
Maricopa	R. S. Hart	Democrat	
Mohave	Earl W. Cooke*	Democrat	
Mohave	Robert Morrow	Democrat	
Navajo	Clay Simer*	Democrat	
Navajo	William R. Bourdon	Republican	
Pima	Thomas Collins	Democrat	
Pima	H. S. Corbett*	Republican	
Pinal	Charles S. Goff	Democrat	
Pinal	Ben Arnold	Democrat	
Santa Cruz	Neilson Brown	Democrat	
Santa Cruz	C. B. Smith	Democrat	
Yavapai	Ray Vyne	Democrat	
Yavapai	Charles H. Orme Sr.*	Democrat	
Yuma	Harold C. Giss*	Democrat	
Yuma	R. H. Thompson	Democrat	

== House of Representatives ==
=== Members ===
The asterisk (*) denotes members of the previous Legislature who continued in office as members of this Legislature.

County	Representative	Party	Notes
Apache	Lorin M. Farr*	Republican	
Cochise	Evelyn Anderson*	Democrat	
Cochise	Charles O. Bloomquist*	Democrat	
Cochise	W. L. Cook*	Democrat	
Cochise	Clyde M. Dalton	Democrat	
Coconino	Andrew Matson	Democrat	
Coconino	Harold J. Scudder	Democrat	
Gila	Nelson D. Breyton	Democrat	
Gila	Louis B. Ellsworth Jr.*	Democrat	
Gila	Edwynne C. "Polly" Rosenbaum*	Democrat	
Graham	Milton Lines*	Democrat	
Graham	E. L. Tidwell*	Democrat	
Greenlee	Tom W. Berry	Democrat	
Greenlee	G. O. Biles	Democrat	
Maricopa	Chas. H. Abels	Democrat	
Maricopa	Carl C. Andersen	Republican	
Maricopa	Carl Austin	Democrat	
Maricopa	David H. Campbell	Republican	
Maricopa	Conrad James Carreon	Democrat	
Maricopa	Ed Ellsworth*	Democrat	
Maricopa	W. W. Franklin*	Democrat	
Maricopa	J. O. Grimes	Democrat	
Maricopa	William J. Harkness	Democrat	
Maricopa	Ruth I. Hunt	Democrat	
Maricopa	Sidney Kartus*	Democrat	
Maricopa	Neales Kennedy	Democrat	
Maricopa	Norman S. Lee	Democrat	
Maricopa	Malcom L. Lentz	Republican	
Maricopa	W. I. (Ike) Lowry	Republican	
Maricopa	C. H. Marion*	Republican	
Maricopa	Laura McRae*	Democrat	
Maricopa	W. W. Mitchell Sr.	Democrat	
Maricopa	Robert L. Myers*	Republican	
Maricopa	Patrick W. O'Reilly	Democrat	
Maricopa	Robert A. Petrie*	Democrat	
Maricopa	James B. Phillips*	Republican	
Maricopa	William S. Porter*	Republican	
Maricopa	S. Earl Pugh	Democrat	
Maricopa	Champe Raftery	Democrat	
Maricopa	Lillian Retzloff	Democrat	
Maricopa	T. C. Rhodes*	Democrat	
Maricopa	Del Rogers	Democrat	
Maricopa	Harry S. Ruppelius*	Democrat	
Maricopa	Arthur B. Schellenberg	Republican	
Maricopa	Carl Sims Sr.*	Democrat	
Maricopa	George R. Steward	Democrat	
Maricopa	J. P. Stump*	Democrat	
Maricopa	Hal Warner*	Democrat	
Maricopa	Ruth Adams White	Republican	
Maricopa	Robert E. Wilson*	Democrat	
Maricopa	Wm. Younger Wood	Democrat	
Mohave	Guy Rutherford	Democrat	
Navajo	Lee F. Dover*	Democrat	
Navajo	Augusta T. Larson	Republican	
Pima	Harry Ackerman	Democrat	
Pima	Vicente Alfaro	Democrat	
Pima	Keith S. Brown	Republican	
Pima	Harold Burton*	Republican	
Pima	James W. Carroll	Democrat	
Pima	Thomas D. Fridena	Democrat	
Pima	John H. Haugh*	Republican	
Pima	Douglas S. Holsclaw*	Republican	
Pima	V. S. Hostetter*	Republican	
Pima	Etta Mae Hutcheson	Democrat	
Pima	James L. Kennedy	Democrat	
Pima	William I. Minor	Democrat	
Pima	Enos P. Schaffer*	Democrat	
Pima	Alvin Wessler*	Republican	
Pima	Julliette C. Willis*	Republican	
Pima	David S. Wine	Democrat	
Pinal	Harry Bagnall	Democrat	
Pinal	Frederick S. Smith	Democrat	
Pinal	E. Blodwen Thode*	Democrat	
Santa Cruz	Robert R. Hathaway	Democrat	
Santa Cruz	Mrs. Weldon Bailey**	Democrat	
Santa Cruz	Robert Hathaway**	Democrat	
Yavapai	Mabel S. Ellis	Democrat	
Yavapai	Dick W. Martin	Republican	
Yavapai	M. A. Lindner***	Democrat	
Yavapai	A. C. McCoy***	Democrat	
Yuma	Robert L. Klauer	Democrat	
Yuma	William B. Carr	Democrat	
Yuma	David B. Babbitt	Democrat	

The ** denotes Mrs. Weldon Bailey was appointed until Robert Hathaway was of legal age to serve.

The *** denotesA. C. McCoy was elected, but died in office. M. A. Lindner was appointed to serve the term
