= 17th Arizona State Legislature =

Session of the Arizona Legislature

←	16th	18th	→
- Arizona State Capitol (2014)

Overview
- Legislative body: Arizona State Legislature
- Jurisdiction: Arizona, United States
- Term: January 1, 1945 – December 31, 1946

Senate
- Members: 19
- Party control: Democratic (19–0)

House of Representatives
- Members: 58
- Party control: Democratic (57–1)

Sessions
- 1st: January 8 – March 9, 1945

Special sessions
- 1st: September 10 – September 29, 1945
- 2nd: April 23 – May 3, 1946
- 3rd: September 9 – September 28, 1946

The 17th Arizona State Legislature, consisting of the Arizona State Senate and the Arizona House of Representatives, was constituted in Phoenix from January 1, 1945, to December 31, 1946, during the third of Sidney Preston Osborn's four consecutive terms as Governor of Arizona. The number of senators and house members remained constant at 19 and 58, respectively. The Democrats controlled one hundred percent of the senate. while the Republicans gained a single house seat.

== Sessions ==
The Legislature met for the regular session at the State Capitol in Phoenix on January 18, 1945; and adjourned on March 9. There were three special sessions, the first of which was held from September 10 through September 29, 1945, the second was held from April 23 – May 3, 1946, and the third was held between September 9 – 28, 1946.

== State Senate ==
=== Members ===
The asterisk (*) denotes members of the previous Legislature who continued in office as members of this Legislature.

County	Senator	Party	Notes
Apache	Bert J. Colter*	Democratic	
Cochise	Ralph Cowan*	Democratic	
Cochise	Dan Angius*	Democratic	
Coconino	James E. Babbitt*	Democratic	
Gila	S. L. Bixby*	Democratic	
Gila	James R. Heron*	Democratic	
Graham	Wesley A. Townsend	Democratic	
Greenlee	A. C. Stanton*	Democratic	
Maricopa	David P. Kimball	Democratic	
Maricopa	Walter J. Thalheimer*	Democratic	
Mohave	Charles P. Elmer	Democratic	
Navajo	Lloyd C. Henning*	Democratic	
Pima	H. H. d'Autremont*	Democratic	
Pima	William Kimball*	Democratic	
Pinal	Charles S. Goff	Democratic	
Santa Cruz	W. H. Hathaway*	Democratic	
Yavapai	Paul C. Keefe*	Democratic	
Yavapai	Norman Fain*	Democratic	
Yuma	Hugo B. Farmer	Democratic	

== House of Representatives ==
=== Members ===
The asterisk (*) denotes members of the previous Legislature who continued in office as members of this Legislature.

County	Representative	Party	Notes
Apache	Don F. Riggs	Democratic	
Cochise	I. A. Rosok	Democratic	
Cochise	M. F. Ryan	Democratic	
Cochise	H. J. Lewis*	Democratic	
Cochise	Frank W. Sharpe Jr.*	Democratic	
Cochise	A. R. Spikes*	Democratic	
Coconino	Frank L. Christensen*	Democratic	
Coconino	W. C. Rittenhouse*	Democratic	
Gila	Robert Fitzgerald*	Democratic	
Gila	William G. Rosenbaum*	Democratic	
Gila	Harold Copp*	Democratic	
Graham	Loren L. Follett	Democratic	
Graham	K. W. Lines	Democratic	
Greenlee	Fred J. Fritz*	Democratic	
Maricopa	Charles H. Abels*	Democratic	
Maricopa	H. C. Armstrong*	Democratic	
Maricopa	G. N. Baker*	Democratic	
Maricopa	Cecil A. Bell*	Democratic	
Maricopa	Jack Cummard*	Democratic	
Maricopa	J. W. Estes	Democratic	
Maricopa	J. H. Fairbanks*	Democratic	
Maricopa	Carroll Hudson*	Democratic	
Maricopa	O. A. Kane	Democratic	
Maricopa	Sidney Kartus	Democratic	
Maricopa	R. F. Kilpatrick*	Democratic	
Maricopa	Alvin Lindsey*	Democratic	
Maricopa	0. L. McDaniel*	Democratic	
Maricopa	D. McDonald*	Democratic	
Maricopa	T. McGowan*	Democratic	
Maricopa	Laura McRae*	Democratic	
Maricopa	M. Joe Murphy	Democratic	
Maricopa	S. Norton*	Democratic	
Maricopa	Claire Phelps*	Democratic	
Maricopa	Kenneth K. Pound*	Democratic	
Maricopa	Joe M. Rumsey*	Democratic	
Maricopa	Roy A. Taylor	Democratic	
Maricopa	Fletcher West Timmerman	Democratic	
Mohave	E. L. Jameson*	Democratic	
Navajo	John L. Westover*	Democratic	
Navajo	Clay B. Simer	Democratic	
Pima	Bob Barber	Democratic	
Pima	Robert H. Forbes*	Democratic	
Pima	Joseph J. O'Neill*	Democratic	
Pima	Roy Martin*	Democratic	
Pima	John S. Hardwicke	Democratic	
Pima	John H. Ayraud*	Democratic	
Pima	James W. Ewing	Republican	
Pima	D. M. Penny*	Democratic	
Pima	A. Berky*	Democratic	
Pinal	0. W. Rugg	Democratic	
Pinal	George Ernst*	Democratic	
Santa Cruz	Richard S. Stearns Jr.*	Democratic	
Yavapai	Robert E. Perkins*	Democratic	
Yavapai	Ralph C. Hooker	Democratic	
Yavapai	Leonard Klein*	Democratic	
Yavapai	Harry E. Metz*	Democratic	
Yuma	Clara Osborne Botzum*	Democratic	
Yuma	N. S. McCallum	Democratic	
