= Richard Kimball (politician) =

American politician (born 1946)

Member of the Arizona Corporation Commission
- In office January 1983 – September 1985
- Preceded by: Jim Weeks
- Succeeded by: Sharon Megdal

Member of the Arizona Senate from the 21st district
- In office 1979–1983
- Preceded by: Timothy D. Hayes
- Succeeded by: Carl J. Kunasek

Personal details
- Born: 1946 (age 79–80)
- Party: Democratic
- Parent: Bill Kimball
- Education: University of Arizona
- Profession: Activist; Politician

Richard Kimball is an American politician who is the founder and president emeritus of the nonprofit voter education organization Vote Smart.

== Early life ==
Kimball was born in Tucson, Arizona, in 1946. He was the third son of Maxine and Bill Kimball. His father served as the Majority Leader in the Arizona State Senate and was a candidate for Governor of Arizona in 1954. Kimball attended the University of Arizona where he studied political science. He was a staff assistant to Congressman Morris Udall and worked as a press secretary for Senators Walter Mondale and Daniel Moynihan.

== Political career ==
In 1978, Kimball was elected to represent an area of Phoenix in the Arizona Senate. In the 1982 general election, Kimball was elected to a six-year term on the Arizona Corporation Commission. In January 1984, his fellow commission members elected him the chairman of the board. In September 1985, Kimball resigned from his position as a member of the commission. Governor Bruce Babbitt appointed Sharon Megdal, a member of the University of Arizona's economics faculty, to the seat.

== 1986 U.S. Senate election ==
After the expected Democratic candidate, Governor Bruce Babbitt, declined to run in favor of a presidential campaign, Kimball was nominated as the Democratic candidate against then-Congressman John McCain for the U.S. Senate seat being vacated by Barry Goldwater. His campaign was subject to negative press from The Arizona Republic and Phoenix Gazette. One Gazette columnist described him as displaying "terminal weirdness." McCain ultimately won the election by a margin of over 20 percent. Kimball later said: "I joke that John McCain entered the Senate over my dead political body. I think that's pretty accurate."

Twenty years later, Kimball commented on the campaign to a reporter from the Arizona Daily Star: "I was enormously depressed — not because I lost. It was because I spent all my time collecting money." He said that he spent the following months after the election traveling through Mexico, and then left politics to start Project Vote Smart.

== Vote Smart ==
He is the former president and current president emeritus of the organization Vote Smart, formerly known as Project Vote Smart.

Party political offices
Preceded by William R. Schulz	Democratic nominee for U.S. Senator from Arizona (Class 3); 1986	Succeeded by Claire Sargent
