= Pat Hayhurst =

American politician from Arizona

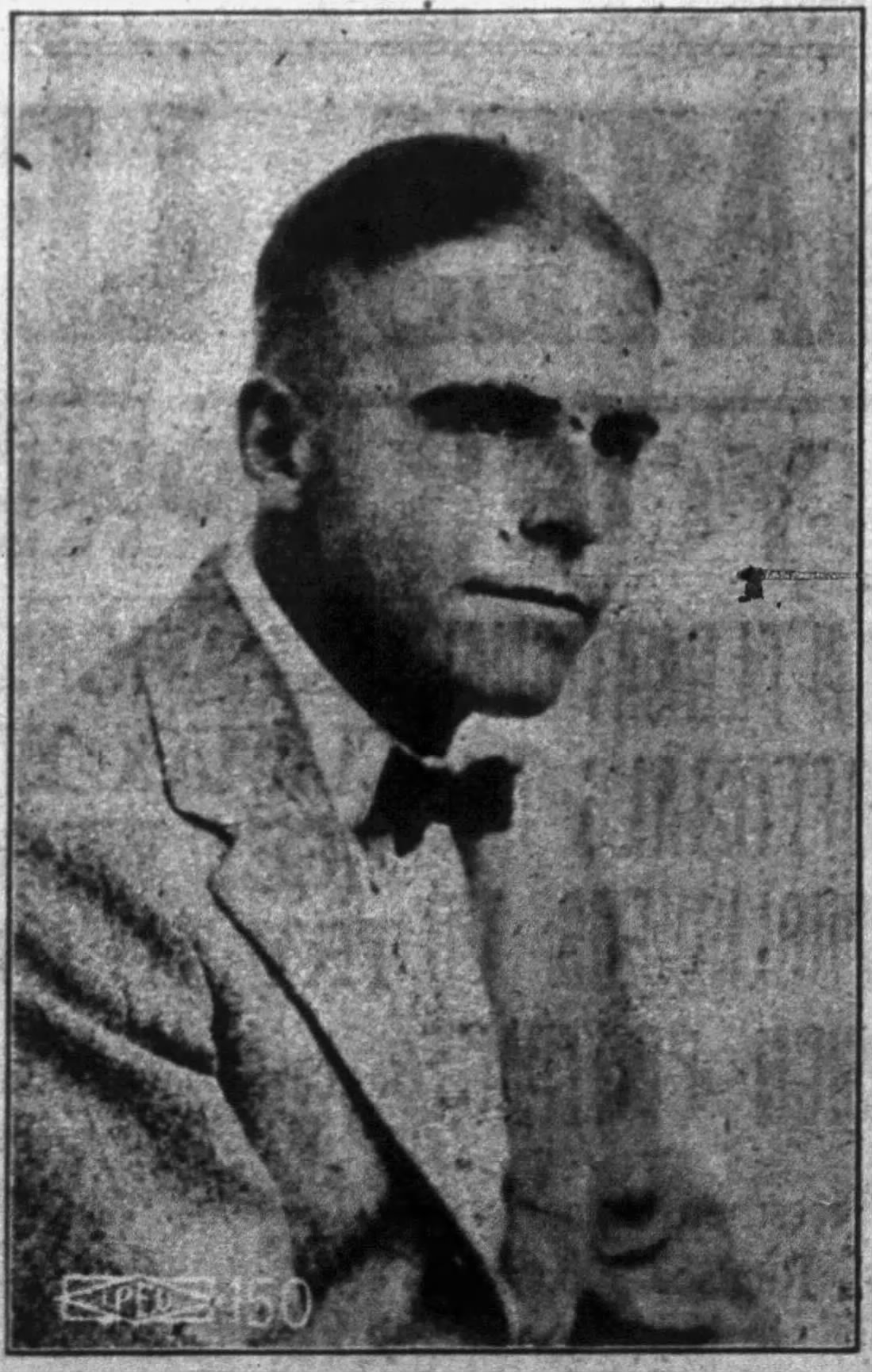
- Hayhurst, ca. 1922

Member of the Arizona Senate from the Pima County district
- In office January 1923 – December 1924
- Preceded by: F. O. Goodell; Elias Hedrick
- Succeeded by: Claude Smith; T. W. Donnelly

Personal details
- Party: Democratic
- Profession: Politician

Pat Hayhurst was an American politician from Arizona. He served a single term in the Arizona State Senate during the 6th Arizona State Legislature, holding one of the two seats from Pima County.

== Biography ==
He was the editor of the Southwest Labor Record. He married Ramona Carljohn in Tombstone, Arizona on January 1, 1923.

He ran for the Democrat nomination for the Arizona State Senate from Pima County. He and Harry Drachman finished 1–2, respectively, in the Democrat primary, and went on to win in November's general election. He did not seek re-election in 1924.
