= 1956 Arizona Senate election =

- November 6, 1956

All 28 seats of the Arizona Senate 15 seats needed for a majority
	Majority party	Minority party
Party	Democratic	Republican
Seats before	26	2
Seats after	26	2
Seat change	Steady	Steady
Senate President before election
Clarence L. Carpenter
Democratic
Elected Senate President
Clarence L. Carpenter
Democratic

The 1956 Arizona Senate election was held on November 6, 1956. Voters elected all 28 members of the Arizona Senate to serve two-year terms. At the time, each of Arizona's 14 counties elected two state senators for a total of 28 members of the Arizona Senate. Primary elections were held on September 11, 1956.

Prior to the elections, the Democrats held a supermajority of 26 seats over the Republicans' 2 seats.

Following the election, Democrats maintained control of the chamber and kept their supermajority of 26 Democrats to 2 Republicans. The newly elected senators served in the 23rd Arizona State Legislature.

== Summary of Results by County ==
County	Incumbent	Party	Elected Senator	Outcome
Apache	Lynn Lockhart	Dem	Lynn Lockhart	Dem Hold
Apache	Melvin C. Greer	Dem	Melvin C. Greer	Dem Hold
Cochise	A. R. Spikes	Dem	A. R. Spikes	Dem Hold
Cochise	Fred Dove	Dem	Dan S. Kitchel	Dem Hold
Coconino	Robert W. Prochnow	Dem	Robert W. Prochnow	Dem Hold
Coconino	Fred F. Udine	Dem	Fred F. Udine	Dem Hold
Gila	Clarence L. Carpenter	Dem	Clarence L. Carpenter	Dem Hold
Gila	William A. Sullivan	Dem	William A. Sullivan	Dem Hold
Graham	Wilford R. Richardson	Dem	Wilford R. Richardson	Dem Hold
Graham	Jim Smith	Dem	W. B. Mattice	Dem Hold
Greenlee	M. L. (Marshall) Simms	Dem	M. L. (Marshall) Simms	Dem Hold
Greenlee	A. C. Stanton	Dem	Carl Gale	Dem Hold
Maricopa	Joe Haldiman, Jr.	Dem	Joe Haldiman, Jr.	Dem Hold
Maricopa	R. S. Hart	Dem	Frank G. Murphy	Dem Hold
Mohave	Earle Cook	Dem	Earle Cook	Dem Hold
Mohave	Robert E. Morrow	Dem	Robert E. Morrow	Dem Hold
Navajo	William R. Bourdon	Rep	William R. Bourdon	Rep Hold
Navajo	Clay Simer	Dem	J. Morris Richards	Dem Hold
Pima	Hiram H. (Hi) Corbett	Rep	Hiram H. (Hi) Corbett	Rep Hold
Pima	Thomas Collins	Dem	Harry Ackerman	Dem Hold
Pinal	Ben Arnold	Dem	Ben Arnold	Dem Hold
Pinal	Charles S. Goff	Dem	Charles S. Goff	Dem Hold
Santa Cruz	Neilson Brown	Dem	Neilson Brown	Dem Hold
Santa Cruz	C. B. (Bert) Smith	Dem	C. B. (Bert) Smith	Dem Hold
Yavapai	Charles H. (Chick) Orme, Sr.	Dem	Charles H. (Chick) Orme, Sr.	Dem Hold
Yavapai	Ray Vyne	Dem	David H. Palmer	Dem Hold
Yuma	Harold C. Giss	Dem	Harold C. Giss	Dem Hold
Yuma	Ray H. Thompson	Dem	Ray H. Thompson	Dem Hold

== Detailed Results ==
=== Apache District ===
General election results
Party	Candidate	Votes	%
Democratic	Lynn Lockhart (incumbent)	1,564	37.23%
Democratic	Melvin C. Greer (incumbent)	1,537	36.59%
Republican	P. I. Ashcroft	1,100	26.18%
Total votes		4,201	100.00%
Democratic hold			
Democratic hold			

=== Cochise District ===
General election results
Party	Candidate	Votes	%
Democratic	Dan S. Kitchel	9,018	50.06%
Democratic	A.R. Spikes (incumbent)	8,995	49.94%
Total votes		18,013	100.00%
Democratic hold			
Democratic hold			

=== Coconino District ===
General election results
Party	Candidate	Votes	%
Democratic	Robert W. Prochnow (incumbent)	4,759	53.14%
Democratic	Fred F. Udine (incumbent)	4,197	46.86%
Total votes		8,956	100.00%
Democratic hold			
Democratic hold			

=== Gila District ===
General election results
Party	Candidate	Votes	%
Democratic	Clarence L. Carpenter (incumbent)	5,909	43.12%
Democratic	William A. Sullivan (incumbent)	5,753	41.98%
Republican	Albert E. "Sandy" Sanders	2,041	14.89%
Total votes		13,703	100.00%
Democratic hold			
Democratic hold			

=== Graham District ===
General election results
Party	Candidate	Votes	%
Democratic	Wilford R. Richardson (incumbent)	2,867	51.00%
Democratic	W. B. Mattice	2,755	49.00%
Total votes		5,622	100.00%
Democratic hold			
Democratic hold			

=== Greenlee District ===
General election results
Party	Candidate	Votes	%
Democratic	M. L. (Marshall) Simms (incumbent)	3,589	44.23%
Democratic	Carl Gale	3,452	42.54%
Republican	Loren R. Brokaw	561	6.91%
Republican	Homer F. Emmons	513	6.32%
Total votes		8,115	100.00%
Democratic hold			
Democratic hold			

=== Maricopa District ===
General election results
Party	Candidate	Votes	%
Democratic	Joe Haldiman, Jr. (incumbent)	79,119	35.86%
Democratic	Frank G. Murphy	76,698	34.76%
Republican	Charles H. Garland	64,827	29.38%
Total votes		220,644	100.00%
Democratic hold			
Democratic hold			

=== Mohave District ===
General election results
Party	Candidate	Votes	%
Democratic	Robert E. Morrow (incumbent)	1,865	42.86%
Democratic	Earle Cook (incumbent)	1,564	35.95%
Republican	Ben Joy	922	21.19%
Total votes		4,351	100.00%
Democratic hold			
Democratic hold			

=== Navajo District ===
General election results
Party	Candidate	Votes	%
Republican	William R. Bourdon (incumbent)	3,165	35.05%
Democratic	J. Morris Richards	3,001	33.23%
Democratic	Clay Simer (incumbent)	2,864	31.72%
Total votes		9,030	100.00%
Republican hold			
Democratic hold			

=== Pima District ===
General election results
Party	Candidate	Votes	%
Republican	Hiram H. (Hi) Corbett (incumbent)	35,539	37.10%
Democratic	Harry Ackerman	31,249	32.62%
Democratic	Thomas Collins (incumbent)	29,008	30.28%
Total votes		95,796	100.00%
Republican hold			
Democratic hold			

=== Pinal District ===
General election results
Party	Candidate	Votes	%
Democratic	Ben Arnold (incumbent)	7,976	51.56%
Democratic	Charles S. Goff (incumbent)	7,493	48.44%
Total votes		15,469	100.00%
Democratic hold			
Democratic hold			

=== Santa Cruz District ===
General election results
Party	Candidate	Votes	%
Democratic	C. B. (Bert) Smith (incumbent)	1,928	42.36%
Democratic	Neilson Brown (incumbent)	1,911	41.99%
Republican	Charles O'Keefe	712	15.64%
Total votes		4,551	100.00%
Democratic hold			
Democratic hold			

=== Yavapai District ===
General election results
Party	Candidate	Votes	%
Democratic	Charles H. (Chick) Orme, Sr. (incumbent)	6,567	50.39%
Democratic	David H. Palmer	6,465	49.61%
Total votes		13,032	100.00%
Democratic hold			
Democratic hold			

=== Yuma District ===
General election results
Party	Candidate	Votes	%
Democratic	Harold C. Giss (incumbent)	8,128	52.12%
Democratic	Ray H. Thompson (incumbent)	7,468	47.88%
Total votes		15,596	100.00%
Democratic hold			
Democratic hold			
