= Senator Donnelly (disambiguation) =

Joe Donnelly (born 1955) is a former United States Senator from Indiana. Senator Donnelly may also refer to:

- Davis A. Donnelly (1927–2020), Wisconsin State Senate
- Ignatius L. Donnelly (1831–1901), Minnesota State Senate
- Ken Donnelly (1950–2017), Massachusetts State Senate
- Melinda Romero Donnelly (born 1971), Senate of Puerto Rico
- Thomas F. Donnelly (New York City) (1863–1924), New York State Senate
- T. W. Donnelly (1874–1963), Arizona State Senate
