= Elias Hedrick =

American politician from Arizona

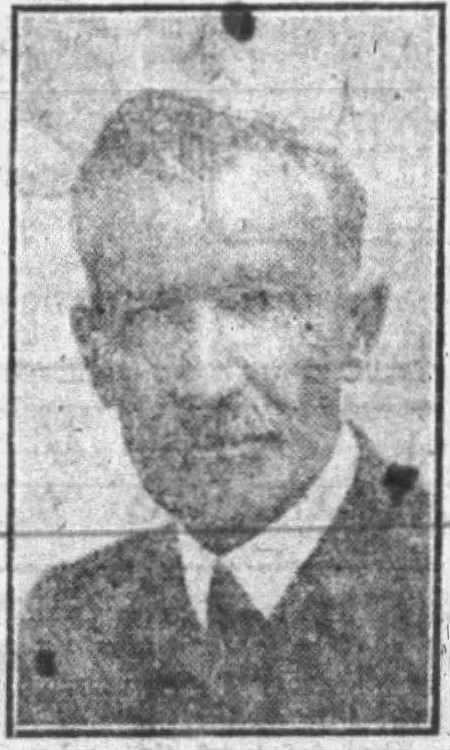
- Hedrick, c. 1918

Member of the Arizona Senate from the Pima County district
- In office January 1921 – December 1922
- Preceded by: A. R. Buehman
- Succeeded by: Pat Hayhurst; Harry A. Drachman

Personal details
- Party: Republican
- Profession: Politician

Elias Hedrick (1862–1949) was an American politician from Arizona. He served a single term in the Arizona State Senate during the 5th Arizona State Legislature, holding the seat from Pima County. Prior to his senate term, Hedrick served a single term in the Arizona House of Representatives during the 4th Arizona State Legislature. He was known as a philanthropist, particularly to the Methodist Episcopal Church in Tucson, Arizona. Outside of politics he was a highly successful real-estate man.

== Biography ==
Hedricks was born in Alfordsville, Indiana, in 1862, although he always considered Washington, Indiana, his home town. In the 1890s, Hedrick worked as the superintendent of the Live Poultry Transportation Company in Chicago, Illinois. The Hedricks moved to Tucson in 1900 from Chicago, due to health of Ada Hedrick. After his arrival in Tucson in 1900, Hedrick was employed by the Southern Pacific Railroad, as a general platform manager. While working for the Southern Pacific, Hedrick was also involved in real estate development and construction in Tucson. By 1905, Hedrick was on the board of trustees of the First Methodist Episcopal Church. That same year, they erected a new church building. In 1911 he was employed by the Southern Arizona Bank and Trust Company, as manager of their real estate department. In 1912, he resigned so that he could focus on his own real estate projects. He continued in the real estate business throughout the 1910s.

In 1917, Hedrick, a Republican, ran as part of a "Fusion Ticket", along with a Progressive and a Democrat, for the Tucson City Council. The group was in favor of a new charter for the city, which would re-vamp the city government. Two of the three Fusion candidates won in the December election, Hedrick, and Democrat J. Breck Richardson. The Progressive, J. C. Clancy, lost a tight race with incumbent Al Bernard. In 1918, a new charter for the city of Tucson was put up to vote. It had been discussed for months, and in February five citizens were nominated to become the city commissioners under the new charter in the event of its passage. Hedrick was one of the five nominated. However, in March 1918 the new charter was soundly defeated. In September 1918, Hedrick ran for one of the three seats from Pima County to the Arizona House of Representatives. Only three Republicans ran in the primary, guaranteeing that all three would be the Republican nominees. In the November election, all three Republicans defeated their Democrat opponents, with Hedrick being the overall top vote-getter. In 1919, Hedrick declined to run for re-election to the Tucson City Council.

In 1920, he became one of three Republicans seeking one of the two nominations for state senator from Pima County. Hedrick and incumbent F. O. Goodell won the primary. Both Hedrick and Goodell won in November's general election. In 1920, Hedrick developed the section of Tucson called, "Hedrick Acres". It included the street still named "Hedrick Drive". In 1922, Hedrick ran for re-election, however he was narrowly defeated by 33 votes in the general election by Democrat Pat Hayhurst. He ran again for the State Senate in 1926, losing in the general election by an even narrower margin of 28 to William C. Joyner.

Hedrick was married to Ada Charlotte Whyte. It was due to Mrs. Hedrick's heart issues that the Hedricks moved to Tucson from Chicago. Ada moved to Los Angeles in 1926, due to her declining health. She died on December 27, 1929, in Los Angeles from a paralytic stroke. The couple had no children. In 1927, when his wife moved to Los Angeles, Hedrick donated their house to the church, and it became the parsonage. It remained the parsonage when the new church was built in 1931. In 1931, a new church building was constructed. Part of the complex included the Hedrick Memorial Chapel, dedicated to Ada Hedrick. The church became known as "The Church of the Chimes", due to the gift Deagan Chimes, also given by Hedrick to the church in memory of his wife. The chimes were installed in the Memorial Tower. Hedrick served on the board of trustees of the First Methodist Episcopal Church through 1943. In 1943, Hedrick donated a new parsonage to the church, dedicating it to the memory of his wife, replacing the old parsonage, which had also been donated by Hedrick. Hedrick died on May 21, 1949, in Chicago, where he had been bed-ridden for three years. He was buried in Washington, Indiana.
