= Senator Drachman =

Senator Drachman may refer to:

- Harry A. Drachman (1869–1951), Arizona State Senate
- Mose Drachman (1870–1935), Arizona State Senate
