= Albert R. Buehman =

American politician and photographer

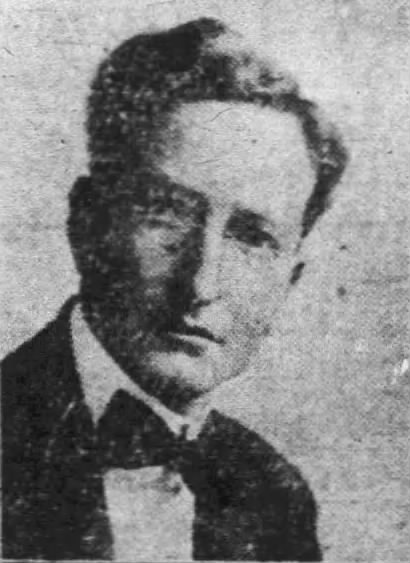
- Buehman, ca. 1918

Arizona House of Representatives
- In office January 1917 – December 1918
- Constituency: Pima County

Member of the Arizona Senate from the Pima County district
- In office January 1919 – December 1920
- Preceded by: J. W. Buchanan
- Succeeded by: Elias Hedrick

Personal details
- Born: 1886 Tucson, Arizona
- Died: December 23, 1967 (aged 80–81) Tucson
- Party: Republican
- Spouse: Ella Doyle
- Children: A. Harry, Fred Richard, Remick T., Lucy
- Education: University of Arizona, Michigan College of Mining and Technology
- Profession: Politician, photographer

Albert Rex Buehman (1886 – December 23, 1967) was an American photographer and politician from Arizona. He served a single term in the Arizona House of Representatives during the 3rd Arizona State Legislature, followed by a single term in the Arizona State Senate during the 4th Arizona State Legislature, holding one of the two seats from Pima County. He was unsuccessful in bids for the U. S. House of Representatives in 1948 and for the Mayor of Tucson in 1955. The photography business his father began in 1873 in Tucson was the oldest photography studio in Arizona when it closed in 1956. His daily column in the Arizona Daily Star ran from 1950 through 1954.

== Early life ==
Buehman was born in Tucson in 1886. His parents were Henry Buehman and Estelle Morehouse. Henry was an immigrant photographer from Germany, and Estelle had been raised in Michigan. The elder Buehman had immigrated to the United States in 1868, traveling throughout the nation and Mexico, before settling down in Tucson in 1874. Estelle had come to Globe, Arizona in 1880, where she taught kindergarten. In 1881, she moved to Tucson where she also taught kindergarten, prior to her marriage to Henry in 1882. His father, began the family's photography business, and served as mayor of Tucson from 1895 to 1899. He attended Tucson Public Schools, as well as the University of Arizona's preparatory academy, before going to the Michigan College of Mining and Technology, where he obtained both B. S. and E. M. degrees in 1911.

In 1907 Buehman took a position as the assistant assayer for the Tombstone Mining Company, in Tombstone. After his graduation from the Michigan College of Mining and Technology in June 1911, Buehman accepted a position with the Consolidated Mining and Smelting Company in British Columbia.

Buehman married Ella Doyle of Glendale, California on August 15, 1912. Their first child, Albert Henry, was born on June 6, 1913, in Glendale, California. The couple had four children, three sons, A. Harry, Fred Richard, and Remick T., and a daughter, Lucy. Buehman began working in his father's photography business in 1912, taking it over in December, after his father's death. In 1919 and 1930, he was elected president of the Arizona Associated Photographers.

== Political career ==
In 1916 he ran on the Republican ticket for the Arizona House of Representatives. Of the three Republicans, only Buehman was elected to the House in November. In 1918 Buehman chose not to run for re-election, instead throwing his name in the ring for the Republican nomination for one of the two Senate seats from Pima County. Along with incumbent F. O. Goodell, the two ran unopposed in the Republican primary. Both Buehman and Goodell were successful in the November general election. He did not run for re-election in 1920.

In 1933, Buehman decided to run for the Tucson school board, to unseat incumbent Dr. S. C. Davis. In what was termed a very bitter campaign, Davis easily defeated Buehman, to gain re-election. In 1948 Buehman announced his intention to run for the U. S. House of Representatives from Arizona's 2nd congressional district. He easily defeated his nearest opponent, A. M. Ward, in the Republican primary, 5,507 to 1,947, but was easily defeated in turn by Democrat Harold Patten in November's general election, 54,066 to 30,140. In December 1954, Buehman announced his intent to run for mayor of Tucson. He won the Republican primary in February, but narrowly lost, by just over 300 votes, to Democrat Don Hummel in the general election in April 1955.

== Later years ==
In 1925 Buehman collaborated with Lone Wolf on the artist's portrait of Leighton Kramer, a Tucsonan rodeo sponsor. In 1929, his photos received several national blue ribbons from the Photographers' Association of America. In 1934, Buehman's photographs of the kidnapping scene of June Robles gained national attention. In August 1939, Buehman was chosen to be the president of the Photographer's Association of America, serving in that capacity through 1940. Buehman was also an associate in the Royal Photographic Society of Great Britain, being admitted in February 1941. In August 1949, Buehman was elected president of the American Society of Photographers (ASP), after having served the prior two years as its vice-president. The ASP was a highly exclusive group of photographers, limiting their membership to 50 nationwide.

In September 1949, Buehman stepped down from running the photographic studio his father had begun in 1873. He passed the torch to his son, Remick, who had been working at the studio since 1946. In December 1949, Buehman accepted the position of executive manager of the Photographers' Association of America (PAA), which entailed him moving to Cleveland, Ohio. The PAA was the largest photographers' association in the United States. In October 1950, Buehman resigned as executive manager of the PAA and returned to Phoenix. On December 26, 1950, his featured column, "Arizona Album" premiered in the Tucson Daily Citizen. It was published daily, with the exception of Sundays. He remained its editor through December 1964, his last column being published on December 30.

His social activities included heavy participation in the Kiwanis Club, the Y. M. C. A., and the Tucson Merchant's Association. Buehman was heavily involved in the Order of DeMolay, and was also greatly involved in the Masons, holding several state and national positions. Buehman also served several terms as the president of the Arizona Pioneers Historical Society.

Buehman died on December 23, 1967, at his home in Tucson from a heart attack.

== Legacy ==
Some of his more notable photographs include Charles Lindbergh's arrival in Tucson in 1927, coverage of the Mexican Revolution, and John Dillinger's capture by Tucson police in 1934.

In 1968, shortly after Buehman's death, a collection of over 140,000 photographs taken by him and his father was donated to the Arizona Pioneers Historical Society. The pictures covered the time frame of the 1870s through the 1950s, and cover the growth of Tucson over that period, as well as life in pioneer Arizona.

Buehman's son Remick joined the army in 1951 to serve in the Korean War. When he did he sold the family's photography business. Five years later, in 1956, the business' new owners declared bankruptcy and closed the store. At the time it was the oldest photography firm in Arizona.
