= Senator Goodell (disambiguation) =

Charles Goodell (1926–1987) was a U.S. Senator from New York from 1968 to 1971. Senator Goodell may also refer to:

- Fred Goodell (1876–1961), Arizona State Senate
- Lemuel Goodell (1800–1897), Wisconsin State Senate
