= Claude Smith (politician) =

American politician from Arizona

Member of the Arizona Senate from the Pima County district
- In office January 1925 – December 1926
- Preceded by: Pat Hayhurst; Harry A. Drachman
- Succeeded by: William C. Joyner

Personal details
- Born: May 26, 1891 Caddo, Indian Territory
- Died: September 20, 1931 (aged 40) Tucson, Arizona, United States
- Party: Democratic

Military service
- Allegiance: United States
- Years of service: 1919

Claude Smith (26 May 1891 - 20 September 1931) was an American politician from Arizona. He served a single term in the Arizona State Senate during the 7th Arizona State Legislature, holding one of the two seats from Pima County. He was a veteran of World War I, and served as county attorney in Pima County.

== Biography ==
Smith was born on March 26, 1891, in Caddo, Oklahoma. After graduating from the public schools in Oklahoma, Smith attended Washington & Lee University, where he graduated with a LL.B. in law in 1913. After graduating from Washington & Lee, he did postgraduate work at Yale University, studying constitutional law under William Howard Taft. Following Yale, he returned to Oklahoma, passed the bar, and served as U. S. probate attorney. At the outbreak of the U. S. entrance into World War I, Smith enlisted in the U. S. Army as private. By the time of his discharge in 1919, he had risen to the rank of N. C. O. When he returned to Oklahoma after the war, he went back to the position of probate attorney. In 1920, he developed tuberculosis, and moved to Tucson, Arizona for his health. He recuperated for two years before returning to practice law. Smith was very active in both The Elks and the American Legion, as well as the Disabled American Veterans, and the Masons.

In 1924 he ran uncontested for one of two seats to the Arizona State Senate from Pima County in the Democrat's primary. He and his fellow Democrat, T. W. Donnelly defeated their lone Republican opponent, John E. Van Buskirk, in the general election in November. He did not run for re-election in 1926. In November 1928, he was appointed to fill the unexpired term of Louis R. Kempf as Pima County Attorney. Smith was selected over Fred Fickett. In 1930 he did not run for re-election for the attorney position, instead choosing to run against Fickett, the incumbent, for Judge of the Superior Court. Fickett was re-elected.

Smith died on September 20, 1931, from a hemorrhage in the Veteran's hospital in Tucson.
