= John H. Wilson (Arizona politician) =

American politician (1907–1975)

John Hugh Wilson (March 31, 1907 – March 9, 1975) was an Arizona politician who served as a member of the Arizona House of Representatives during the 19th Arizona State Legislature (1949–1950).

Wilson died on March 9, 1975 in Phoenix, Arizona, at the age of 67.
