= Merton Martensen =

American politician from Arizona

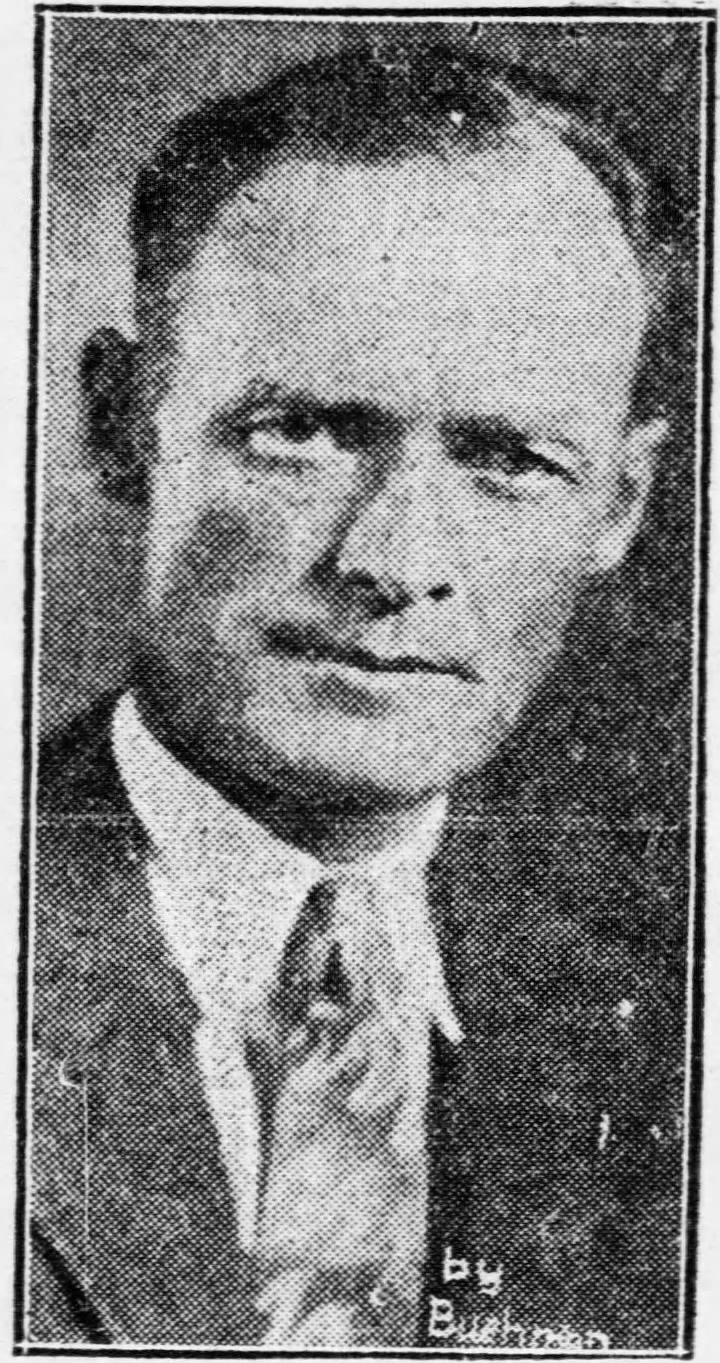
- Martensen, ca. 1929

Member of the Arizona Senate from the Pima County district
- In office January 1929 – December 1930
- Preceded by: William C. Joyner
- Succeeded by: Thomas Collins

Personal details
- Born: 1894 Barron County, Wisconsin
- Died: December 5, 1948 (aged 53–54)
- Party: Republican
- Profession: Politician

Merton Martensen was an American politician from Arizona. He served a single term in the Arizona State Senate during the 9th Arizona State Legislature, holding one of the two seats from Pima County.

== Biography ==
Martensen was born in 1894 in Barron County, Wisconsin. Martensen moved to Arizona in 1909. After moving to Arizona he worked in various occupations, as waiter, milkman, bellhop, and publicity agent for the Southern Pacific Railroad. During the Mexican Revolution, Martensen served as the driver for Pancho Villa. With the outbreak of World War I in 1914, Martensen went to Canada and joined the Canadian Army. He transferred to the British Army in order to see action earlier, and was gassed twice before transferring to the British Flying Corps, where he was involved in a plane crash, and was eventually made a blimp pilot. After the ware he returned to his native Wisconsin in 1919. In 1922 he was elected sheriff of Barron County, serving for two years, and then the following two years as deputy sheriff, due to state laws prohibiting sheriff's from being re-elected. In 1926 he returned to Arizona, where he became a journalist for the Arizona Daily Star.

In 1928, he won the Republican primary for the State Senate from Pinal County in a write-in vote campaign. Then he followed that up with a narrow general election victory over Democrat D. M. Perry by 16 votes. The results were challenged by Perry, but the courts finally adjudicated Martensen as the winner. While a senator, he was instrumental in getting the state's fingerprinting law passed. In October 1929, Martensen was appointed by Governor John C. Phillips as Secretary of the Board of Directors of State Institutions, accepting the position necessitated his resignation from the Arizona State Senate. Martensen was killed at age 54 in a car accident on December 5, 1948, while visiting San Bernardino County, California.
