= Thomas Collins (Arizona politician) =

American politician from Arizona

Member of the Arizona Senate from the Pima County district
- In office January 1955 – December 1956
- Preceded by: Bill Kimball
- Succeeded by: Harry Ackerman
- In office January 1951 – December 1952
- Preceded by: J. B. Mead
- Succeeded by: James W. Ewing
- In office January 1931 – December 1936
- Preceded by: Merton Martensen
- Succeeded by: Henry A. Dalton; August Wieden

Personal details
- Born: 1883 County Cork, Ireland
- Died: February 25, 1966 (aged 82–83) Tucson, Arizona
- Party: Democratic
- Spouse: Mary M. Duffy
- Profession: Politician

Thomas Collins was an American politician from Arizona. He served several terms in the Arizona State Senate, his first stint lasting from the 10th through 12th Arizona State Legislatures, holding one of the two seats from Pima County. He also served from Pima County during the 20th and 22nd Arizona State Legislatures. He also served several terms on the Pima County Board of Supervisors.

== Biography ==
Collins was born in 1883 in County Cork, Ireland. Collins moved to Tucson, Arizona in 1904, and began working for the Southern Pacific Railroad as an engineer, where he remained for 47 years until his retirement in 1961. In 1918, Collins was on the Tucson Board of Freeholders, and was one of the men responsible for drafting the city's charter that year.

In 1922, Collins was elected to the Pima County Board of Supervisors. He ran for re-election in 1924, defeating Danie Burke in the Democrat primary. In the general election in November, Collins lost by a single vote, 1608–1607, to Republican J. P. Compton. Collins did file a recount petition, during which the question of whether or not Papago Indians had the right to vote. Collins eventually dropped his suit, making Compton the winner. He ran for the Board of Supervisors again in 1926, defeating Steve Roemer in the primary, but losing to Republican George Bedell in the general election.

Collins married Mary M. Duffy on August 21, 1928. Although Duffy was also from Tucson, the two married in Los Angeles. In 1930, he ran for one of the two seats in the Arizona State Senate from Pima County. He and fellow Democrat, T. W. Donnelly, the incumbent, were uncontested in the primary, with Collins taking the top spot. The two Democrats easily defeated their Republican opponents in the general election, with Collins once again taking the top spot. Both he and Donnelly ran for re-election in 1932. It was initially reported that both went down to defeat in the primary. However, when all the votes were counted, Collins came in second in a four-man race, with E. T. Houston the top vote-getter. They easily defeated the Republicans in the November general election. Collins and Houston both ran for re-election in 1934, taking the top two spots in a six-man Democrat primary. They were unopposed in the general election. In 1936, Collins did not run for re-election to the State Senate, instead choosing to run for the Democrat nomination to run for Arizona's seat in the U. S. House of Representatives. He finished seventh in a field of eleven.

Collins once again ran for the State Senate, this time in 1950. He and incumbent Bill Kimball easily defeated the Republicans in November. Kimball and Collins ran for re-election in 1952, however, while Kimball won, Collins finished fourth. He was back in 1954, coming in second behind Republican Hiram S. Corbett in the general election. He ran one last time in 1956 for re-election, but lost in the general election, coming in third. Collins died on February 25, 1966, in St. Mary's Hospital in Tucson.
