= Vote Smart =

US non-profit, non-partisan organization

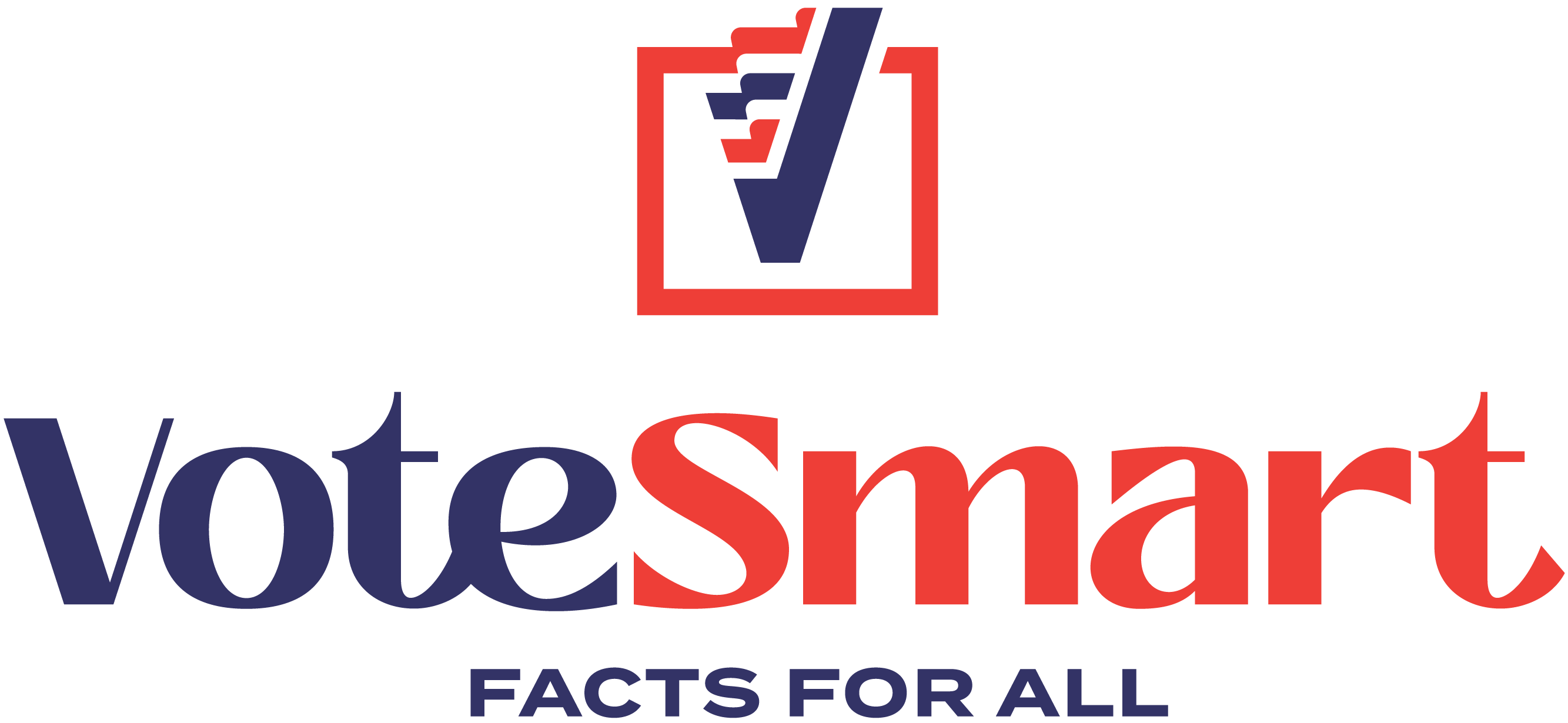
- Formation: 1992
- Headquarters: 1153 24th Street, Des Moines, Iowa 50311
- President: Kyle Dell
- Revenue: $941,346 (2025)
- Expenses: $1.48 million (2025)
- Website: votesmart.org
- Formerly called: Project Vote Smart

Vote Smart, formerly called Project Vote Smart, is an American nonprofit, non-partisan research organization that collects and distributes information on candidates for public office in the United States. It covers candidates and elected officials in six basic areas: background information, issue positions (via the Political Courage Test), voting records, campaign finances, interest group ratings, and speeches and public statements. This information is distributed via their web site, a toll-free phone number, and print publications. The founding president of the organization was Richard Kimball. Kimball became president emeritus in 2022, when Kyle Dell was announced as the new president of Vote Smart.

PVS also provides records of public statements, contact information for state and local election offices, polling place and absentee ballot information, ballot measure descriptions for each state (where applicable), links to federal and state government agencies, and links to political parties and issue organizations.

== History ==
In 1986, Richard Kimball ran unsuccessfully for one of Arizona's two U.S. Senate seats. In a candidates' debate, he described the campaign process to prospective voters:

Understand what we do to you. We spend all of our time raising money, often from strangers we do not even know. Then we spend it in three specific ways: First we measure you, what it is you want to purchase in the political marketplace—just like Campbell's soup or Kellogg's cereal. Next, we hire some consultants who know how to tailor our image to fit what we sell. Lastly, we bombard you with the meaningless, issueless, emotional nonsense that is always the result. And whichever one of us does that best will win.

Kimball used this philosophy to found Vote Smart in 1992. His founding board included Presidents Jimmy Carter (D) and Gerald Ford (R), plus Republican U.S. Senator Barry Goldwater and Democratic U.S. Senators George McGovern and William Proxmire as well as other nationally known figures.

Originally based at Oregon State University in Corvallis, Oregon, PVS established its headquarters and research center in 1999 at the Great Divide Ranch near Philipsburg, Montana. In 2006, Vote Smart added a branch at The University of Arizona in Tucson, Arizona. Coincident with this move, Vote Smart gave its president Richard Kimball a pay increase that was criticized by some alumni and contributed to a reduction in its Charity Navigator score. In December 2010, the Tucson office was closed in preparation for two new satellite research offices. The reason for the closure of the Tucson branch was also related to the university's budget cuts, which eliminated Vote Smart's "rent-free space at a 1,500- square-foot house off the main campus."

In January 2011, Vote Smart moved its Key Votes Department and Political Courage Test Department to facilities offered by both the University of Texas at Austin and the University of Southern California. Vote Smart has since left the University of Southern California and moved its Political Courage Department to its Montana research center.

In March 2014, Vote Smart laid off six employees, citing financial difficulties. A seventh employee quit because of the sudden layoffs.

In August 2016, Vote Smart announced that it would be selling its 150-acre ranch near Philipsburg, Montana, and relocating its headquarters after the November 2016 U.S. presidential election. Kimball said the ranch's secluded location, which housed 40 interns, had caused issues: "We have all the problems a university does with the experimental, adventurous, hormonal torrent that is the young. Only in the wilderness such things can become dangerous. Love was requited and denied, marriages were created, fights ensued, drinkers crashed, injuries of every sort, hospital trips too numerous to recall, some to sustain life, and distressingly, three deaths." Drake University in Des Moines, Iowa was later announced as the new headquarters.

== Funding ==
Vote Smart says that it does not accept contributions from corporations, labor unions, political parties, or other organizations that lobby, support or oppose candidates or issues. Donors to the organization have included the Ford Foundation, the Carnegie Corporation of New York, and the John S. and James L. Knight Foundation.

Individual contributors are considered members, and are given the opportunity to visit their headquarters where they work as research volunteers alongside interns and staff.

== Political Courage Test ==
The Political Courage Test (formerly the National Political Awareness Test, NPAT) is an American initiative intended to increase transparency in American politics.

It is part of the voter education organization Vote Smart's candidate information program. With a view towards elections, the test seeks to obtain answers from election candidates, describing their respective stances on a variety of popular issues in American politics. This information is then made available to voters in a selection-driven, standardized format.

In 2008, Project Vote Smart kicked John McCain off the organization's board due to his refusal to fill out the Political Courage Test.

The response to the Political Courage Test has dropped, from 72% in 1996 to 48% in 2008 and even further to 20% by 2016, because politicians from both parties are afraid that challengers will use their responses out of context in attack ads, according to The Wall Street Journal. Rep. Anne Gannon, Democratic leader pro tempore of the Florida House of Representatives, stated: "We tell our candidates not to do it. It sets them up for a hit piece." In response, Vote Smart has tried to shame politicians into it, and lets them leave up to 30% of answers blank.

== VoteEasy ==
VoteEasy is "the interactive tool that enables voters to compare their position on various issues with that of a candidate." It was introduced by Vote Smart during the 2010 election season.

Following its launch, VoteEasy was a topic of interest among several national news organizations including CBS News, The New York Times, and the Christian Science Monitor.

== See also ==
- On the Issues
