= Gustav A. Hoff =

German-born American businessman and politician (1852–1930)

Gustav A. "Gus" Hoff
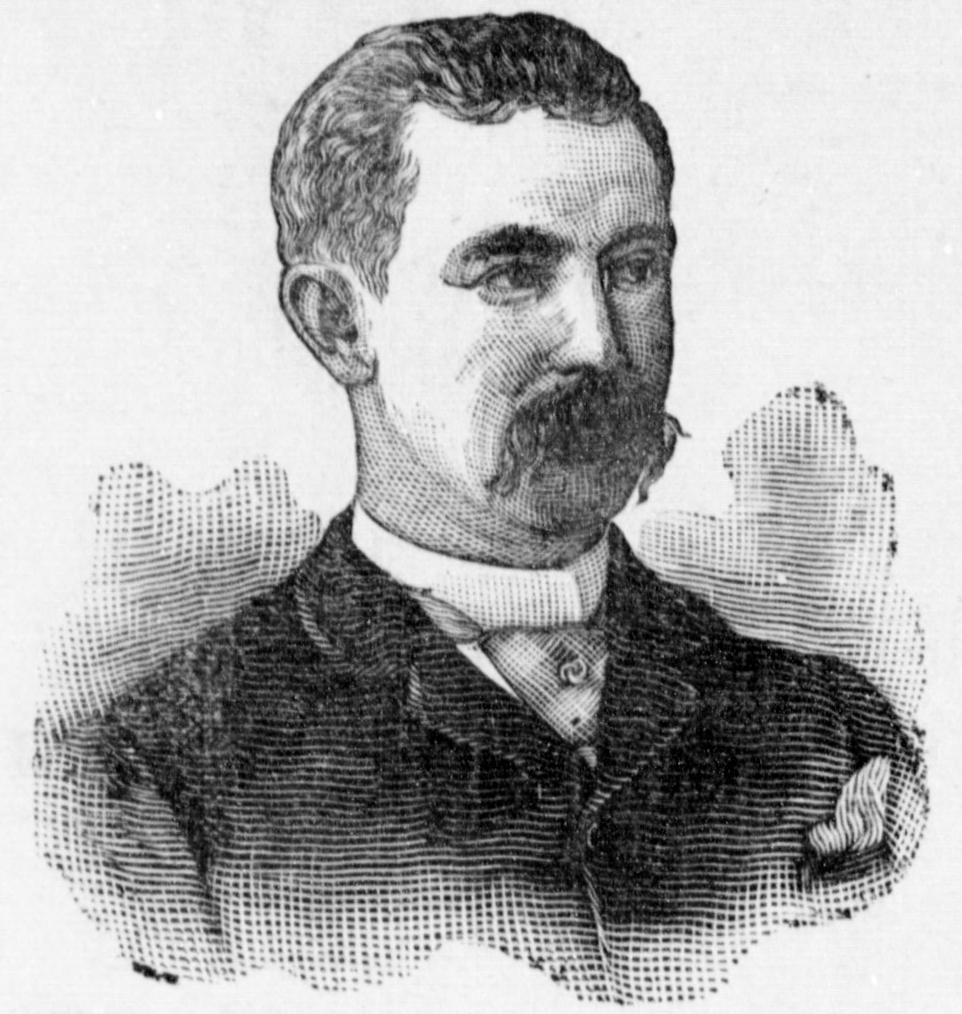

Mayor of Tucson, Arizona
- In office January 3, 1899 – January 7, 1901
- Preceded by: Henry Buehman
- Succeeded by: Charles J. Schumacher

Personal details
- Born: December 7, 1853 Dresden, Saxony
- Died: February 18, 1930 (aged 76) Tucson, Arizona
- Party: Democratic
- Spouse: Alice A. Ford (m. 1880)

Gustav Anton "Gus" Hoff (December 7, 1852 – February 18, 1930) was a German-born American businessman and politician active in Arizona Territory. Beyond his varied business interests, he was a member of the Arizona Territorial Legislature and served one term as Mayor of Tucson.

== Biography ==
Hoff was born to Charles F. and Ernestine (Korth) Hoff near Dresden, Saxony on December 7, 1852. His family moved to Yorktown, Texas in 1855. Young Hoff received the bulk of his education in Yorktown schools. In 1865, during the turbulence following the American Civil War, his family returned to Germany. He attended a local gymnasium for two years before his family returned to the United States.

In 1874, Hoff joined his father driving mule teams in Utah's Little Cottonwood Canyon. The next year his family moved to San Bernardino, California. Hoff worked with his father in the freight business until 1877, when his father left to work in mining in Arizona and New Mexico territories. Following the breakup of the family business, the younger Hoff worked as a clerk for Hellman, Haas & Co. of Los Angeles for three years. On September 11, 1880, Hoff married Alice A. Ford (1856–1963). The union produced five children: Mamie, Pearl, Clara, Florence and Louis.

Hoff moved to Tucson, Arizona Territory to work for the German Fruit Company in 1881. Nine months later he was in the employ of C. Seligmann & Co. When that business closed he joined with his brother, Charles, to form Hoff Brothers. The partnership lasted about a year before failing. Hoff then went to work for L. Zeckendorf & Company.

Fraternally, Hoff was a Mason and held memberships in the Ancient Order of United Workmen, Benevolent and Protective Order of Elks, Spanish-American Association, Woodmen of the World, and Knights of Pythias. Both he and his wife were Christian Scientists, and his wife is credited as being the first Christian Science practitioner in Tucson, and after the couple purchased a house in 1887 their home became the city's first meeting place for the Christian Science Church. In 1888, Hoff served one term on the Tucson city council.

Following his term on the city council, Hoff's friends arranged for a Democratic party nomination for a seat in the territorial legislature. Hoff won election and represented Pima County in the House of Representatives (lower house) during the 1891 session. During his term, he served as a member of the judiciary committee, as chairman of the ways and means committee, and as chairman of the special committee in charge of the funding act. The session saw Hoff introduce more bills than any other member of the House. He successfully guided a bill instituting the Australian ballot (secret ballot) into law. His support of a women's suffrage bill resulted in him being labeled "Petticoat Hoff".

In 1892, Hoff formed the Tucson Grocery Company with partners L.G. Radulovich and A.V Grossetta. Five years later he became a founder of the Tucson Hardware Company. In this role he advertised himself as "Hoff of Tucson". His other business interests included being organizer and secretary of the Citizen's Building and Loan Association, secretary of the Tucson Board of Trade, and various mining interests. Politically, he was a member of the Pima County Central Democratic Committee.

Hoff served as Mayor of Tucson from January 1899 till January 1901. The biggest accomplishment during his term was the city's purchase of the local waterworks. Other accomplishments included construction of graded roads, installation of cement sidewalks, and creation of a new sewer system. One newspaper described Hoff as "one of Tucson's most progressive citizens" further stating "we do not recall a single progressive movement that he did not staunchly support." After leaving office, Hoff became a manager for L.H. Manning Co., a firm that operated stores from El Paso, Texas to Portland, Oregon along the Southern Pacific Railroad.

Hoff died in Tucson on February 18, 1930. He was buried in Tucson's Evergreen cemetery. Tucson's Hoff Street (now Hoff Avenue) was named for him and his brother.
