= 1986 United States Senate election in Arizona =

- November 4, 1986
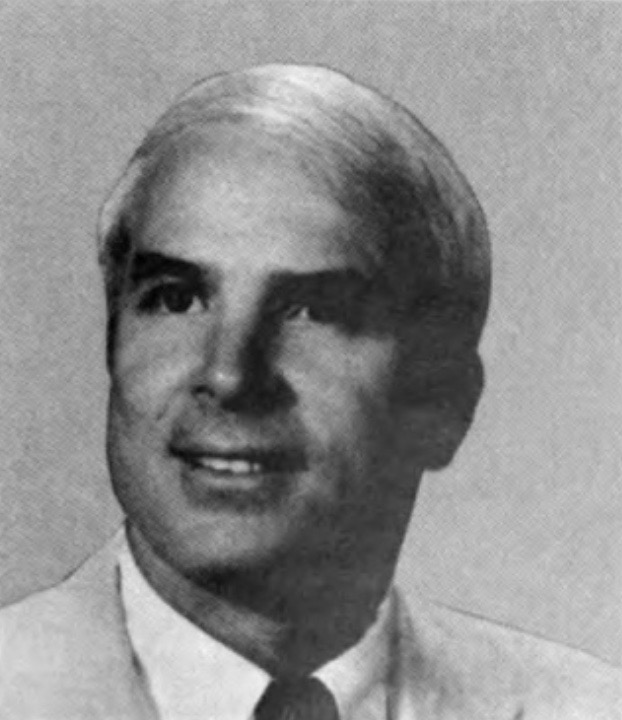

Nominee	John McCain	Richard Kimball
Party	Republican	Democratic
Popular vote	521,850	340,965
Percentage	60.48%	39.51%
- County results McCain: 50–60% 60–70% Kimball: 50–60%
U.S. senator before election
Barry Goldwater
Republican
Elected U.S. Senator
John McCain
Republican

The 1986 United States Senate election in Arizona was held on November 4, 1986. Incumbent Republican U.S. Senator Barry Goldwater decided to retire instead of seeking a sixth term. The open seat was won by John McCain, Republican candidate and Incumbent United States Representative from Arizona's 1st congressional district and former Office United States Navy, as well as future 2008 presidential candidate against Democrat Barack Obama, as so was Goldwater in 1964 against incumbent Democrat Lyndon B. Johnson. McCain would remain in the Senate until his death on August 25, 2018.

== General election ==
=== Candidates ===
- Richard Kimball, former member of the Arizona Corporation Commission and State Senator (Democratic)
- John McCain, U.S. Representative from Tempe (Republican)

=== Campaign ===
Initially, Democrats sought to recruit two-term governor Bruce Babbit, but Babbit declined, ultimately to focus on a presidential bid.

Kimball's campaign was subject to negative press from the Arizona Republic and Phoenix Gazette. One Gazette columnist described him as displaying "terminal weirdness." McCain ultimately won the election by a margin of 21%.

=== Results ===
General election results
Party	Candidate	Votes	%	±%
Republican	John McCain	521,850	60.48%	+11.02%
Democratic	Richard Kimball	340,965	39.51%	−8.87%
Write-in		106	0.01%	
Majority		180,885	20.96%	+19.88%
Turnout		862,921		
Republican hold		Swing		

== See also ==
- 1986 United States Senate elections
