= Louis Zeckendorf =

German-American merchant

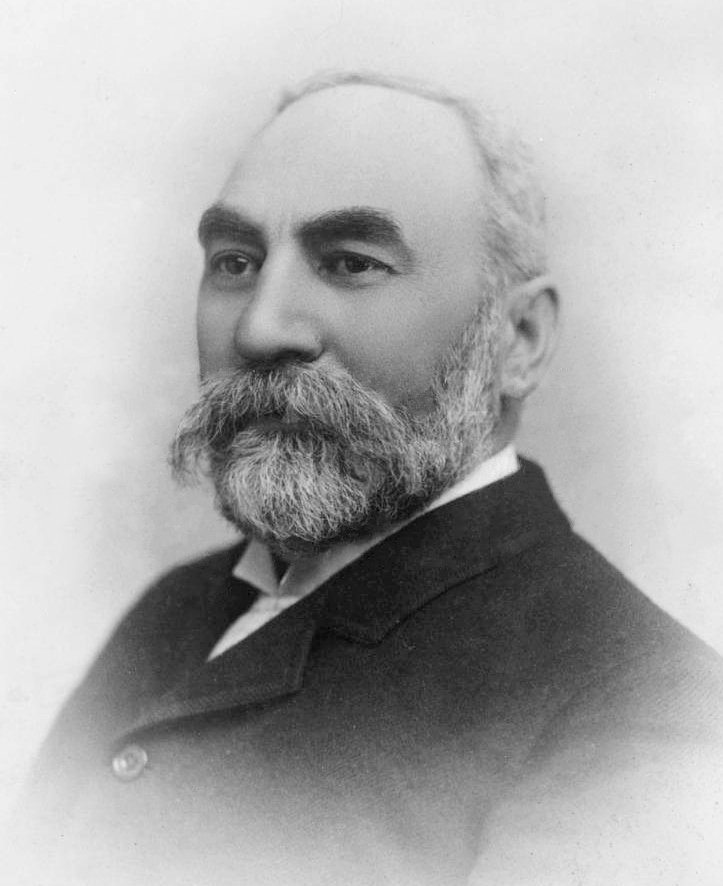
- Born: April 6, 1838; Kingdom of Hanover
- Died: March 11, 1937 (aged 98); New York City, New York, United States
- Occupation: Merchant
- Known for: Mining and mercantile enterprises in New Mexico and Arizona
- Spouse: Matilda Z. Leventritt (m. 1870)
- Children: Aurthur Louis Zeckendorf
- Relatives: Aaron Zeckendorf (brother); William Zeckendorf (brother); Albert Steinfeld (nephew)

Louis Zeckendorf (April 6, 1838 – March 11, 1937) was a Jewish German-born American merchant. He was primarily involved in the mining industry in New Mexico and Arizona, as well as in shipping and supplies supporting that industry.

== Biography ==
Zeckendorf was born in the Kingdom of Hanover on April 6, 1838. After growing up in Hanover, in 1854 he immigrated to Santa Fe, New Mexico, to join his brother Aaron, with his younger brother William joining them a year later. Louis and Aaron became members of the historical society, with Aaron being a charter member.

They founded their first store with financial support from the Spiegelbergs, their former employers. Under the banner of A. & L. Zeckendorf, Wholesale and Retail, Aaron opened a Santa Fe branch, and Louis opened one in Albuquerque (an additional branch was opened in Deming, and stores near mining camps along the Rio Mimbres). The store was moderately successful; but suffered a downturn in business at the start of the Civil War. When the South invaded New Mexico, their businesses suffered heavy taxes, as they were loyal to the Union, and their brother William was an officer in the Union army. Their success was renewed when the southern troops were driven out of New Mexico.

In 1865, heavy snow in the Raton Mountains caused them to lose a large amount of dry goods. In 1866, Louis sold $50,000 worth of goods to Charles T. Hayden. Upon improved business prospects, he went to New York City, and established a purchasing branch of the company in 1867. The brothers hired their nephew, Albert Steinfeld in 1872. After his older brother Aaron died in 1872, Louis sold his share of the business to William and a brother in law, Theodore Welisch. The partnership soon failed, and Louis reluctantly partnered with his younger brother, William, to form Zeckendorf brothers. When Louis bought William's share of the business in 1878, he reformed the business with his nephew, Albert Steinfeld to create L. Zeckendorf & Company. By 1889, their Tucson business was the largest retail and wholesale merchandising business in the Arizona Territory. He sold furniture to the Santa Rita Hotel. At its peak, the company had $1.5 million in annual revenue (about 54 million dollars in 2025).

Louis was also one of the founding members of the Copper Queen Mining Company. He gained the rights to freighting supplies and equipment into Mule Gulch, and the rights to shipping ore and bullion westward. In addition, Louis was the first treasurer of the company and also served as a secretary and manager. Louis also invested in the Ray mine, heavily in silver and gold mining in Montana and the Silver Bell mine.

Around 1872, William's wife, Julia Zeckendorf had become owner of the Old Boot mine. William asked his nephew to become a trustee of the mine, and he agreed. In 1897, he leased the mine to Carl S. Nielsen. Nielsen was allowed to mine and smelt ore, providing he bought supplies from L. Zeckendorf and Co., and paid a royalty of $1.25 a ton. After six months, Nielsen was $16,000 in debt. On January 14, 1899, a subsidiary of L Zeckendorf and Co, Nielsen Mining & Smelting Corporation was founded to manage the Old Boot mine. James Curtis was appointed to oversee the operation. The endeavor quickly lead to a rift in the relationship between Louis and Albert, and in November 1902, Louis announced his intention to leave the partnership in May 1903. In April, the Imperial Copper Company of Arizona agreed to buy the mine for about $515,000 (roughly 20 million dollars in 2025). Louis filed suit over money he believed had been defrauded from him, and the subsequent lawsuit eventually made its way to the Supreme Court of the United States, first in the 1912 term and again in the 1915 term, with the Court ultimately deciding in Louis' favor.

Louis' involvement in the company ended in 1904, When Albert bought his share of the company. At the end of Zeckendorf's involvement in the company, The Tucson Citizen wrote that "the great name of L. Zeckendorf & Co. is no more." For thirty-five years, it had been "synonymous with enterprise, business sagacity and sterling integrity throughout the commercial world of Arizona and Northern Sonora, Mexico."

He married Matilda Z. Leventritt on December 23, 1870. Their union produced a son: Aurthur Louis. He died in New York City on March 11, 1937.
