= Harry A. Drachman =

American politician from Arizona

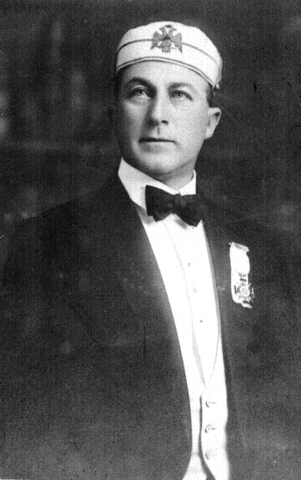

Member of the Arizona Senate from the Pima County district
- In office January 1923 – January 1925
- Preceded by: F. O. Goodell; Elias Hedrick
- Succeeded by: Claude Smith; T. W. Donnelly

Personal details
- Party: Democratic
- Spouse: Florence
- Children: Cowan, Byron, Allen, Oscar, and Rosalie
- Profession: Politician

Harry Arizona Drachman was an Arizona pioneer, businessman and politician. He was born on February 3, 1869, in Tucson, Arizona, the first white Anglo-American male child born in Tucson. Drachman was a 33rd degree mason, and served as a deputy on the Supreme Council of Arizona. He joined the Masons in 1900, and held numerous high positions at the local, state, and national levels. He was also very active in the Knights of Pythias, having also joined that organization in 1900. He eventually rose to hold the position of the Supreme Representative in the organization's Supreme Lodge.

== Career ==
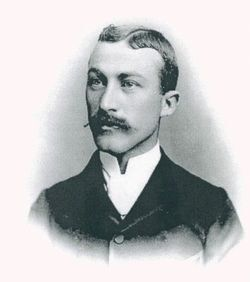

He was the Tucson city treasurer from 1894 to 1898, and the Pima County treasurer between 1898 and 1902. Drachman was a member of the 6th Arizona State Legislature, as a Democrat member of the State Senate from Pima County, a position his brother, Mose had held during the 2nd Legislature.

In 1882 he began working for the L. Zeckendorf & Co. store. In 1895 he left Zeckendorf's, and opened up a shoe store, the Harry A. Drachman Shoe Company, partnering with his younger brother, Mose and Vic Hanny. He ran the shoe business until selling it in 1926. He was a member of Tucson's Chamber of Commerce, serving a number of years as its director, as well as being a member of the Arizona Pioneers Historical Society, serving as its president in 1935.

== Personal life ==
He married Florence Cowan in 1903. The couple had five children, four sons and a daughter: Cowan, Byron, Allen, Oscar, and Rosalie. Drachman died at his home in Tucson on December 26, 1951. He had left a luncheon with old friends the prior week, saying he was feeling poorly.
