= William C. Joyner =

American politician from Arizona

William Joyner
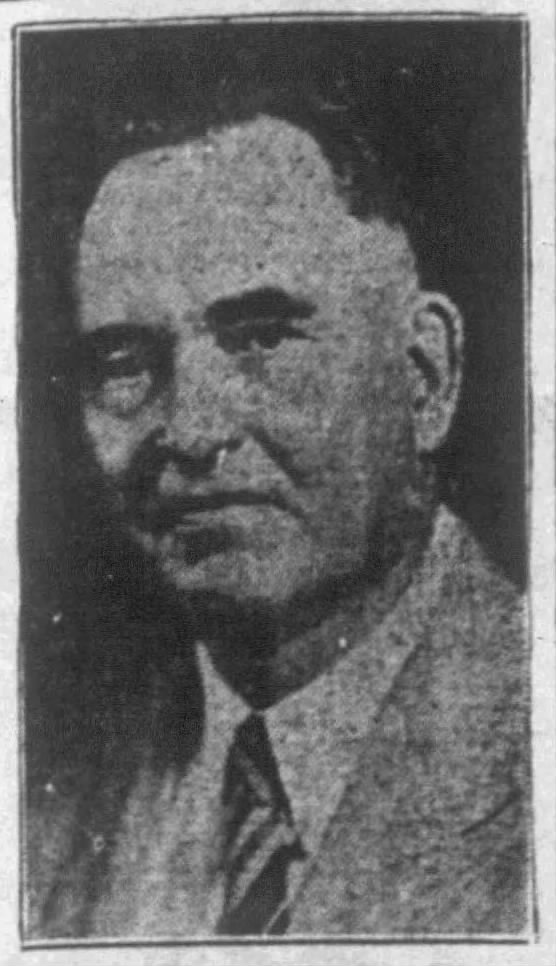
- Joyner c. 1929

Member of the Arizona Senate from the Pima County district
- In office January 1927 – December 1928
- Preceded by: Claude Smith
- Succeeded by: Merton Martensen

Personal details
- Born: 1880 Newburg, Missouri, United States
- Died: 17 July 1943 (aged 62–63) Waynesville, Missouri, United States
- Party: Democratic
- Children: 1 daughter and son
- Education: Missouri University of Science and Technology (BA)

Military service
- Allegiance: United States
- Years of service: 1898

William C. Joyner (1880 - 17 July 1943) was an American politician from Arizona. He served a single term in the Arizona State Senate during the 8th Arizona State Legislature, holding one of the two seats from Pima County. He also served as the state game warden, and was responsible for the construction of the Hunt Bass Hatchery House.

== Biography ==
Joyner was born in 1880 in Newburg, Missouri. After graduating high school in Missouri, he received his bachelor's degree from the Missouri School of Mines. Joyner was a trainman by occupation, and was employed in that capacity when he moved to Tucson, Arizona from Missouri in 1920, and was a member of the Brotherhood of Railroad Trainmen. He also served two terms as a trustee on the University of Arizona Board of Regents and served as the Arizona state chairman for the Democrats. In 1929, he moved from Tucson to Phoenix and entered the real estate business. He was a veteran of the Spanish–American War, having fought in Cuba.

In 1926, he ran for and won one of the two seats from Pima County to the Arizona State Senate. In 1928, he decided not to run for re-election to the State Senate, instead attempting to gain the Democrat nomination for Arizona Secretary of State. While he won Pima County, he did not perform well in the rest of the state, and finished a distant third, with 9,100 votes, behind W. H. Linville (13,270 votes) and John Callaghan (17,769 votes), the eventual winner. He served as the state's game warden, and was responsible for the construction of the Hunt Bass Hatchery House.

In 1936, he attempted to run for the State Senate again, this time from Maricopa County, but finished a distant 5th out of 8 Democrat candidates in the primary. In 1940, he was supervisor in Maricopa and Yuma Counties for the United States census. In 1940, after the census, he moved to Waynesville, Missouri. He died on July 17, 1943, in a hospital in Waynesville.
