= Hayzel Burton Daniels =

American politician, lawyer and judge (1907–1992)

Member of the Arizona House of Representatives
- In office 1950–1952

Personal details
- Born: December 7, 1907 Fort Clark, Texas, US
- Died: March 7, 1992 (aged 84) Phoenix, Arizona, US
- Party: Democratic
- Education: University of Arizona
- Occupation: Lawyer, politician, judge

Hayzel Burton Daniels (December 7, 1907 – March 7, 1992) was an American politician, lawyer, and judge who was the first of two African Americans to serve in the Arizona State Legislature. He was elected to the Arizona House of Representatives alongside Carl Sims in 1950 and served through 1952. Daniels subsequently became the state's first Black assistant attorney general and first Black judge.

== Life and career ==
Daniels was born at Fort Clark in Kinney County, Texas, on December 7, 1907. His father was a Buffalo soldier in the 10th Cavalry Regiment. His family moved to Fort Huachuca in 1913 and later to Nogales, Arizona. He attended Tucson High School, where he was a star running back on the football team and the state's player of the year in 1925 and 1926. He suffered a knee injury and never played college football.

Mopping floors and busing tables at the Old Pueblo Club to pay his way through college, Daniels received his bachelor's degree in social sciences from the University of Arizona in 1939 and his master's degree in education in 1941. He taught at rural schools in Fort Huachuca and served in the United States Army Air Forces from 1943 to 1945, when he was stationed in Burma. Returning to his home state, he attended the University of Arizona School of Law on the G.I. Bill. Graduating in 1948 and passing the state bar examination later that year, Daniels became Arizona's second Black lawyer and the first Black lawyer to be admitted to the State Bar of Arizona. He opened an independent law practice in Phoenix and became active in the NAACP.

In 1950, Daniels was elected to the Arizona House of Representatives, running unopposed in his heavily Democratic district of Phoenix. He served a single two-year term, through 1952. Alongside Carl Sims, he was the first African American to serve in the Arizona State Legislature. He served as vice chair of the House Judiciary Committee and as a member of the Public Defense and the Suffrage and Elections committees. As a legislator and lawyer, Daniels led a successful campaign to desegregate Phoenix's public schools, first enacting legislation that weakened the state's school segregation laws and then litigating to have those laws declared unconstitutional. Superior Court judges Fred C. Struckmeyer Jr. and Charles C. Bernstein duly struck down the law, and the U.S. Supreme Court, in its Brown v. Board of Education decision a few months later, confirmed the state courts' verdicts.

Daniels went on to serve six years as Arizona's first Black assistant attorney general. In 1965, Phoenix mayor Milton H. Graham appointed Daniels to the office of city magistrate. The first Black judge in Arizona history, Daniels served on the Phoenix Municipal Court until his retirement in 1978.

Daniels died on March 7, 1992, at the age of 82. He was a founding member of the Arizona Black Lawyers Association, which honored his memory by changing its name to the Hayzel B. Daniels Bar Association in February 1993. Its successor organization is the Arizona Black Bar.

Daniels was married twice, to Grace Jones in 1942 and Emily Solomon in 1979. He had two adopted and no biological children.
