= 1954 Arizona gubernatorial election =

- November 2, 1954
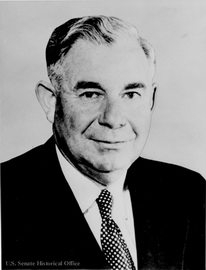

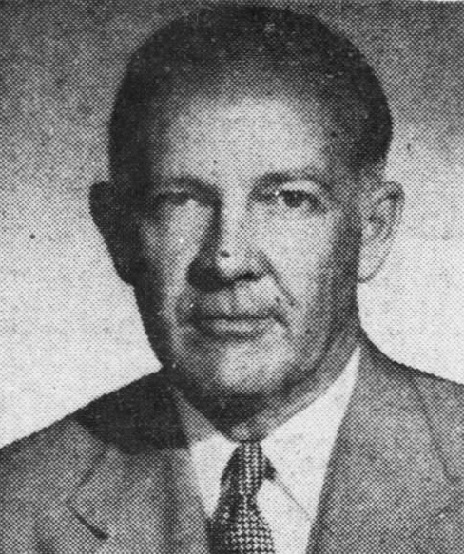
| Nominee | Ernest McFarland | John Howard Pyle |
| Party | Democratic | Republican |
| Popular vote | 128,104 | 115,866 |
| Percentage | 52.51% | 47.49% |
- County results McFarland: 50–60% 60–70% 70–80% Pyle: 50–60%
Governor before election
John Howard Pyle
Republican
Elected Governor
Ernest McFarland
Democratic

The 1954 Arizona gubernatorial election took place on November 2, 1954. Incumbent Governor John Howard Pyle, the first Republican elected to the office in two decades, ran for reelection for a third term.

Former U.S. Senator Ernest McFarland defeated Governor John Howard Pyle by a narrow margin. McFarland had lost his bid for reelection to the United States Senate to Barry Goldwater in 1952, with McFarland subsequently deciding to run for the office of governor.

== Republican primary ==
=== Candidates ===
- John Howard Pyle, incumbent Governor

=== Results ===
Republican primary results
| Party | Candidate | Votes | % |
|---|---|---|---|
| Republican | John Howard Pyle (incumbent) | 29,916 | 100.00% |
| Total votes | | 29,916 | 100.00% |

== Democratic primary ==
The Democratic primary took place on September 7, 1954. Due to the Republican Party tidal wave led by Dwight D. Eisenhower in 1952, incumbent U.S. Senator Ernest McFarland lost his bid for reelection to the United States Senate to Barry Goldwater. He subsequently decided to run for the office of Governor of Arizona and challenge incumbent Republican Governor John Howard Pyle, the first Republican to hold the office for more than two decades. McFarland was challenged in the primary by State Senator William F. Kimball, but McFarland easily won.

=== Candidates ===
- Ernest McFarland, former U.S. Senator
- William F. Kimball, State Senator

=== Results ===
Democratic primary results
| Party | Candidate | Votes | % |
|---|---|---|---|
| Democratic | Ernest W. McFarland | 89,190 | 74.24% |
| Democratic | William F. Kimball | 30,954 | 25.76% |
| Total votes | | 120,144 | 100.00% |

== General election ==
=== Results ===
Arizona gubernatorial election, 1954
| Party | Candidate | Votes | % | ±% |
|---|---|---|---|---|
| Democratic | Ernest W. McFarland | 128,104 | 52.51% | +12.67% |
| Republican | John Howard Pyle (incumbent) | 115,866 | 47.49% | −12.67% |
| Majority | | 12,238 | 5.02% | |
| Total votes | | 243,970 | 100.00% | |
| Democratic gain from Republican | | Swing | +25.34% | |

=== Results by county ===
| County | Ernest W. McFarland Democratic | | John Howard Pyle Republican | | Margin | | Total votes cast |
| County | # | % | # | % | # | % | Total votes cast |
|---|---|---|---|---|---|---|---|
| Apache | 1,457 | 57.98% | 1,056 | 42.02% | 401 | 15.96% | 2,513 |
| Cochise | 6,331 | 58.53% | 4,486 | 41.47% | 1,845 | 17.06% | 10,817 |
| Coconino | 2,631 | 50.71% | 2,557 | 49.29% | 74 | 1.43% | 5,188 |
| Gila | 5,672 | 67.48% | 2,734 | 32.52% | 2,938 | 34.95% | 8,406 |
| Graham | 2,321 | 58.26% | 1,663 | 41.74% | 658 | 16.52% | 3,984 |
| Greenlee | 3,260 | 75.96% | 1,032 | 24.04% | 2,228 | 51.91% | 4,292 |
| Maricopa | 60,728 | 49.83% | 61,139 | 50.17% | -411 | -0.34% | 121,867 |
| Mohave | 1,367 | 60.59% | 889 | 39.41% | 478 | 21.19% | 2,256 |
| Navajo | 2,930 | 54.90% | 2,407 | 45.10% | 523 | 9.80% | 5,337 |
| Pima | 23,881 | 49.57% | 24,296 | 50.43% | -415 | -0.86% | 48,177 |
| Pinal | 5,862 | 60.40% | 3,843 | 39.60% | 2,019 | 20.80% | 9,705 |
| Santa Cruz | 1,507 | 51.17% | 1,438 | 48.83% | 69 | 2.34% | 2,945 |
| Yavapai | 4,558 | 49.66% | 4,621 | 50.34% | -63 | -0.69% | 9,179 |
| Yuma | 5,599 | 60.18% | 3,705 | 39.82% | 1,894 | 20.36% | 9,304 |
| Totals | 128,104 | 52.51% | 115,866 | 47.49% | 12,238 | 5.02% | 243,970 |

==== Counties that flipped from Republican to Democratic ====
- Apache
- Cochise
- Coconino
- Graham
- Mohave
- Navajo
- Pinal
- Santa Cruz
- Yuma
