= Fred Goodell =

American politician from Arizona (1876–1961)

F. O. Goodell
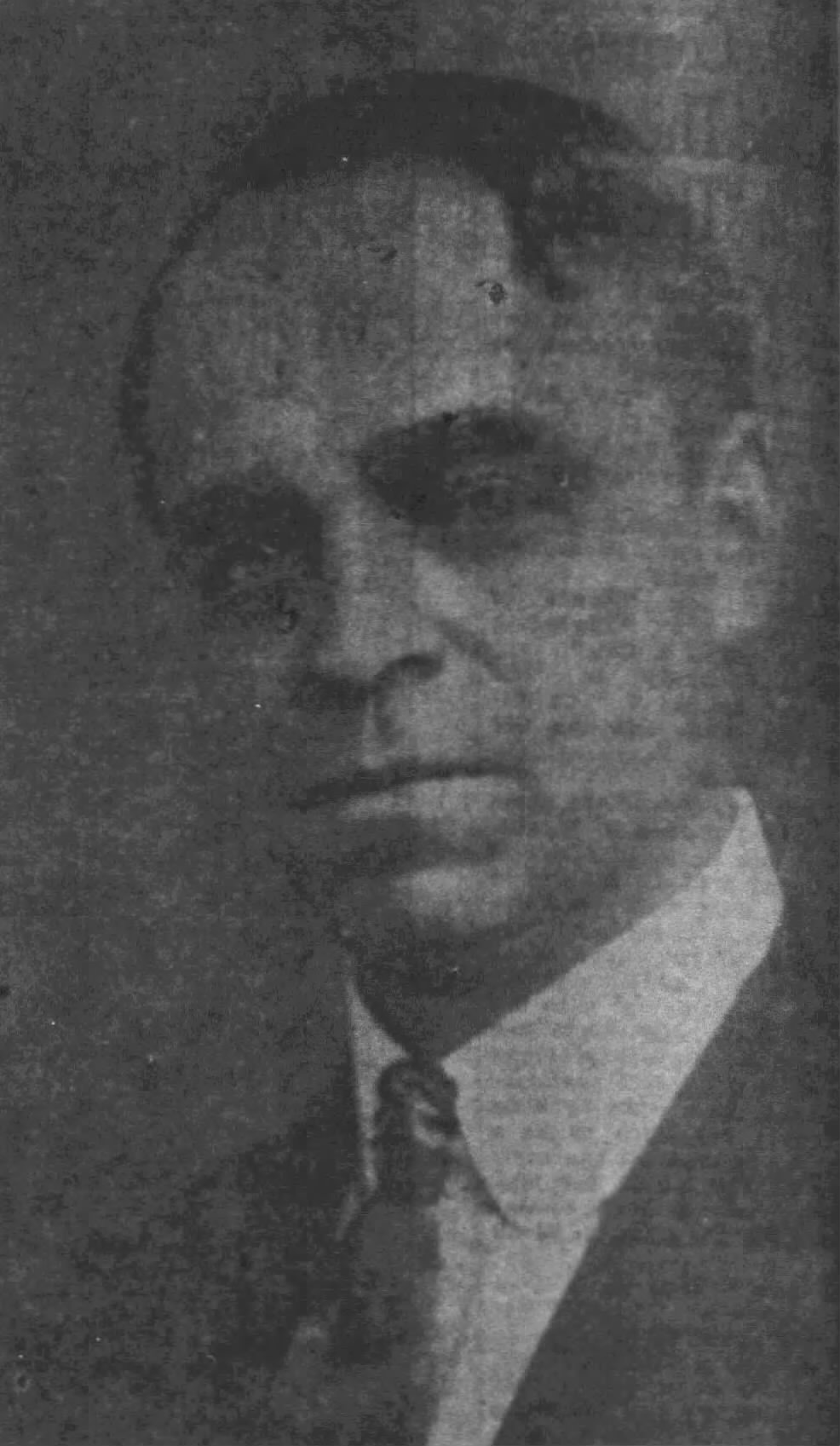
- Goodell, ca. 1920

Member of the Arizona Senate from the Pima County district
- In office January 1917 – December 1922
- Preceded by: Mose Drachman; A. P. Martin
- Succeeded by: Pat Hayhurst; Harry A. Drachman

Personal details
- Born: December 1, 1876 Salem, Oregon or Hillsdale, Kansas
- Died: September 6, 1961 (aged 84) Tucson, Arizona
- Party: Republican
- Spouse(s): Gertrude Humphrey O'Hara (1905-1906, her death), Josie E. Lemon (1906-1961, his death)
- Children: Rolland, Ormal, and Howard
- Profession: Politician

Fred Ormal Goodell (1876–1961) was an Arizona politician who served three consecutive terms in the Arizona State Senate from 1917 through 1922. Very active in the Masons, he served in all of their major posts in Arizona, including being the Grand Master of Masons in Arizona, the Grand Commander of Knights Templar in Arizona, the Grand Master of A. & S. M. of Arizona, and the High Priest of R. A. M. of Arizona. He served as the county comptroller for Pima County for 21 years, from 1935 to 1956.

== Early life ==
Goodell was born on December 1, 1876, although sources disagree whether it was in Salem, Oregon or Hillsdale, Kansas, outside Topeka. His family moved when he was very young to Colorado Springs, Colorado, where they remained until Goodell was 10, when they moved to Nebraska. Goodell spent his early years in Nebreska farming and ranching. He attended Kearney Military Academy in Kearney, and did his post-graduate studies at Boyle's Shorthand and Business School in Omaha. He began working for the railroads in 1898, when he joined the Union Pacific Railroad in Omaha, and moved with the company to Cheyenne, Wyoming the following year. After a friend who lived in Tucson wrote him a glowing letter about the potential of Arizona, he moved to Tucson, Arizona in 1902, where he was employed as a railroad auditor for the Randolph Lines of the Southern Pacific Railroad. He continued working for them until 1927, when he retired to accept an appointment by Herbert Hoover as the Internal Revenue Service collector for Arizona.

Goodell married Gertrude Humphrey O'Hara of Jamestown, New York on June 20, 1905. O'Hara had moved to Tucson the prior year. Tragically, Mrs. Goodell died suddenly less than a year later. She had visited her family in Jamestown and had returned to Phoenix, accompanied by her father. When her father began his journey home, she intended to accompany him part of the way. En route, she contracted pneumonia in San Antonio, Texas, was hospitalized, and died on January 26, 1906. When he received word of his wife's illness, Goodell left for San Antonio, but she died before he arrived. Goodell wed Josie E. Lemon on December 1, 1906. The couple had three sons, Rolland, Ormal, and Howard.

During World War I, Goodell served on the Federal Railroad Control Board.

== Political career ==
In 1916 he sought the Republican nomination for the State Senate. Along with A. J. Davidson, Goodell received the Republican nominations for the two senate seats from Pima County. In the general election in November, Goodell and Democrat J. W. Buchanan were elected to the senate. In 1917 he was appointed to the Tucson City Council to fill out the unexpired term of Warren Grosetta. Grosetta had resigned from the council to join the U. S. Army when the United States entered World War I. When the term expired, Goodell chose not to run for re-election. In 1918 he ran for re-election, this time with former Tucson mayor and former Arizona House of Representatives member, A. H. Beuhman. Being the only two Republicans running, they received their party's nomination. They both won in the general election in November.

Goodell ran for re-election to the state senate in 1920. In the primary, Beuhman had chosen not to run, but there were two other candidates, Elias Hedrick, who had served the prior term in the Arizona House of Representatives, and R. E. Fishburn. Goodell and Hedrick won the primary, and then won the general election in November. With the Republicans in control of the Senate during the 5th Arizona State Legislature, Goodell was given the chairmanship of the appropriations committee. He did not run for re-election in 1922. Goodell was known for his bi-partisanship and being able to work across the aisle with his Democrat colleagues.

In 1934 Goodell was selected to by the Republicans to run for state treasurer in Arizona. He was defeated soundly by a 2–1 margin in the general election by former state treasurer, Mit Sims. In 1935 Goodell was selected by the Republicans to run for mayor of Tucson. He lost to incumbent Henry O. Jaastad by an almost 2–1 margin, 2,873 to 1,448, in an election which saw very few voters, despite expectations for a large turnout. In 1936 one of the three state tax commission positions became open, due to a ruling by the State Supreme Court. The Republicans selected Goodell to run for the vacancy. While Goodell won his home county of Pima by a large margin, he lost to Frank Luke in the general election.

== Later life ==
Goodell was very active in the Tucson Chamber of Commerce, and at one point served as its president. He was also very active in masonic activities. He served in several major masonic positions over the years. He was awarded the 33rd Degree of the Masonic rites in January 1926. In May 1927 the Southern Pacific of Mexico, the division Goodell worked for, moved their headquarters from Tucson to Guadalajara, Mexico. Goodell moved with the business, but his family remained in Tucson. In November 1927, Goodell was appointed by President Calvin Coolidge to become the U. S. Collector of Revenue for the State of Arizona, succeeding John Towles. The appointment necessitated his resignation from the Southern Pacific. Upon taking the appointment, Goodell returned to Tucson, after which the family moved to Phoenix. In July 1928 Goodell's two younger sons, Ormal and Howard were killed in an automobile accident, when the car driven by Ormal went out of control on the road and flipped over. They were on their way from Phoenix to the west coast and were on the Yuma freeway when the accident occurred. Their mother was also in the car, but she escaped with minor injuries. Upon their deaths, Goodell stated, "The boys have never given their parents anything but joy and had brought the parents only admiration and praise." Goodell was also involved in mining pursuits. By the late 1920s Goodell and his partner, Tom Blackburn, owned several mining properties southwest of Tucson. His mines included the Montana, Old California, Esperanza, World's Fair, and Warsaw.

In March 1932 Goodell was elected the Grand Master of Masons in Arizona. In July 1933 he left his position as revenue collector for the I. R. S. In July 1935 Goodell was appointed comptroller for Pima County. It was a position he would hold until 1956. In March 1936 Goodell was elected the Grand Commander of Knights Templar in Arizona. Also in 1936, Goodell was elected as the High Priest of Royal Arch Masons (R. A. M.) of Arizona.

In May 1956, Goodell announced he would retire as county comptroller on June 30, 1956. His retirement was forced due to a state law prohibiting government employees working behind age 75. He remained on in the position until September 30, 1956, In April, 1960 Goodell suffered a stroke and was moved to the Byam Nursing Home in Tucson. He never fully recovered and died the following year on September 6, 1961. He was 84.
