= Carl Sims =

American politician (1911–1968)

Member of the Arizona House of Representatives
- In office January 1951 – January 1961

Personal details
- Born: September 20, 1911 Bremond, Texas, US
- Died: May 28, 1968 (aged 56) Fresno, California, US
- Party: Democratic
- Occupation: Politician, police officer

Carl Sims Sr. (September 20, 1911 – May 28, 1968) was an American politician and law enforcement officer. He was the first of two African Americans to serve in the Arizona House of Representatives, elected alongside Hayzel Burton Daniels in 1950 and serving from January 1951 through January 1961.

== Life and career ==
Sims was born on September 20, 1911, in Bremond, Texas, and moved to Phoenix, Arizona, in 1927. With only an eighth-grade education, he worked as a gardener and painter before working for eight years at the Maricopa County Highway Department. He entered law enforcement and rose to the position of deputy sheriff of Maricopa County. He also became active in Phoenix's small African American community.

In 1950, Sims was elected alongside Hayzel Burton Daniels to the Arizona House of Representatives, becoming the first African Americans to serve in the state legislature. He served five terms in the House, where he campaigned for school desegregation, equitable school funding, and civil rights. He was instrumental in the passage of Arizona's first rabies control bill, enacted in 1962. Daniels served four terms on the House's Highways and Bridges Committee, where he advocated for highway building and improvements; three terms on the Welfare Committee and the Ways and Means Committee; and one term each on the Administration, Arizona Development, Suffrage and Elections, Public Defense and Veterans Affairs, and Public Health committees, the last of which he was vice chair. Daniels lost his seat in 1960 and ran again in 1962 but lost the Democratic primary election.

While a legislator, Sims started a successful business as a painting contractor. In 1967, he was arrested and charged with assault with intent to commit murder and assault with a deadly weapon after allegedly shooting and wounding his wife, Jean Sims, at their home. He was tried and acquitted.

Sims died in Fresno, California, on May 28, 1968, at the age of 56. He was a member of the Seventh-day Adventist Church.
