= T. W. Donnelly =

American politician from Arizona

Member of the Arizona Senate from the Pima County district
- In office January 1925 – December 1932
- Preceded by: Pat Hayhurst; Harry A. Drachman
- Succeeded by: E. T. Houston

Personal details
- Born: February 13, 1874 Dell, Wisconsin
- Died: September 23, 1963 (aged 89) St. Joseph, Michigan
- Resting place: Calvary Cemetery
- Party: Democratic
- Spouse: Daisy Capron
- Children: 1 (daughter)
- Profession: Politician

Thomas W. Donnelly (1874-1963) was an American politician from Arizona. He served four consecutive terms in the Arizona State Senate from the 7th through the 10th Arizona State Legislature, holding one of the two seats from Pima County.

== Biography ==
Thomas Donnelly was born on February 13, 1874, in Dell, Wisconsin. He married Daisy Capron on April 1, 1896, in Wausau, Wisconsin. He was a member of The Elks, and was a charter member of their lodge in Muskegon, Michigan. He moved to Michigan, and then to Arizona in 1916, settling in Tucson. He was a conductor on the Southern Pacific Railroad for 25 years, until his retirement in 1939. He was also on the executive board of the Brotherhood of Railroad Trainmen, at one point serving as their vice-president.

In 1924 he ran for and won one of the two State Senate seats from Pima County. During his first term in the Senate, he co-authored, with H. A. Elliott, the state's workmen's compensation law. He successfully ran for re-election in 1926, 1928, and 1930. In 1932 he ran for re-election once again, but in a big upset, was defeated in the Democrat primary by E. T. Houston. He ran again in 1934, but came in fourth out sixth in the Democrat primary. He made one more attempt for the State Senate, in 1940, but came in sixth out six candidates in the Democrat primary.

In 1943 he moved to live with his daughter and her family in St. Joseph, Michigan. Donnelly died on September 23, 1963, at the home of his daughter in St. Joseph, from a heart attack. He was buried in Calvary Cemetery in Benton Harbor, Michigan.
