= Frank Robles =

American politician

Member of the Arizona House of Representatives from the Pima County district
- In office 1940 – September 1948
- Succeeded by: Tony Rios
- In office January 1949 – 1954
- Preceded by: Tony Rios

Personal details
- Born: December 21, 1911 Tucson, Arizona, U.S.
- Died: February 19, 1973 (aged 61)
- Party: Democratic Party

Frank Guttierez Robles (December 21, 1911–February 19, 1973) was an American politician who was a member of the Arizona House of Representatives as a Democrat from 1944 until his expulsion in 1948. He won re-election after his expulsion.

== Early life and career ==
Born in Tucson, Arizona in 1911, Robles was of Mexican descent. Before his election, he sold newspapers, operated a service station, and managed Los Carlistas, the first band of Lalo Guerrero.

== Arizona House ==
Robles was appointed to the Arizona House of Representatives in 1940 by the Pima County Board of Supervisors. Robles was a progressive, supported civil rights, and pro-labor. During his third term he became friends with fellow Democratic Representative Sidney Kartus. In 1944, he filibustered a proposed water deal for an entire night, causing the House to amend its rules to limit speakers to a maximum 10 minutes. In 1948, Robles faced Tony Rios, who was backed by the Pima County party establishment, in the September Democratic primary. Robles won by 49 votes. Later that month, the American Federation of Labor was protesting outside the capital when Kartus invited 15 steelworkers to the legislature during a debate on Social Security. The men entered the House chamber and refused to leave. When members of the group disrupted the session, Representative Al Spikes told them they could not speak without the consent of the Speaker or house members, to which Robles said “Don’t listen to him. He’s a Communist." After hearing this, Spikes hit Robles twice before the two started a fight which had to be broken up by other representatives. The house voted to expel Robles on a 46-9 for having “incited, aided and abetted certain persons in acts intended to coerce and intimidate members of the 18th legislature.” After his expulsion the Pima County Board of Supervisors appointed Tony Rios to the remainder of his term, while Robles went on to win the general election and return to for three more terms.
