= Bill Kimball =

American politician (1908–1962)

Member of the Arizona Senate
- In office 1941–1955

Personal details
- Born: William F. Kimball; September 25, 1908 Springfield, Massachusetts, U.S.
- Died: May 7, 1962 (aged 53) Tucson, Arizona, U.S.
- Party: Democratic
- Children: Richard Kimball

William F. Kimball (September 25, 1908 – May 7, 1962) was an American Democratic politician who served seven terms in the Arizona State Senate and was an unsuccessful candidate for governor of Arizona in 1954. In the State Senate he represented parts of Pima County. Kimball was first elected in 1940. He ran for President of the Senate twice, losing both times. However, he went on to continue as Senate Majority Leader.

In 1954 Kimball made an unsuccessful bid for governor of Arizona, losing in the Democratic primary against former United States Senator Ernest McFarland. Kimball garnered 25.76% of the vote in the primary.

Kimball was a native of Springfield, Massachusetts. He graduated from Tucson High School and the University of Arizona. He was married to Maxine Kimball, a popular local radio and television personality of the 1940s and 1950s. The couple had four sons. Kimball died in Tucson, Arizona in 1962 at the age of 53.

One of Kimball's sons, Richard Kimball, would later serve in the Arizona State Senate himself and go on to become the Democratic nominee for U.S. Senator in the 1986 election, losing to future Republican nominee for President in the 2008 election, John McCain.
