= Sidney Kartus =

American politician

Sidney Kartus was an American politician who was a member of the Arizona House of Representatives from 1944 until his expulsion in 1948. He won re-election after his expulsion.

== Arizona House ==
Kartus, a Democrat, was from Phoenix, Arizona. He was elected to the Arizona House of Representatives in 1944. In 1945, Kartus introduced failed legislation to impeach Sidney Preston Osborn. In 1948, he invited 15 steelworkers to the legislature during a debate on Social Security. The men entered the House chamber and refused to leave. When members of the group disrupted the session, Representative Al Spikes told them they could not speak without the consent of the Speaker or house members, to which Frank Robles said “Don’t listen to him. He’s a Communist” before proceeding to beat Spikes. Kartus was blamed for inviting the men and inciting the incident. The House voted to expel Kartus 42-13 for having “incited, aided, and abetted certain persons in acts intended to coerce and intimidate members of the 18th legislature.” He was re-elected in the election later that year.
