= Slipher =

Slipher may refer to:

== People ==
- Earl C. Slipher (1883–1964), American astronomer
- Vesto Slipher (1875–1969), American astronomer

== Astronomical namings ==
- 1766 Slipher, main-belt asteroid
- Slipher (lunar crater), crater on the Moon
- Slipher (Martian crater), crater on Mars
