= Lowell Observatory =

Astronomical observatory and historic landmark in Arizona, US

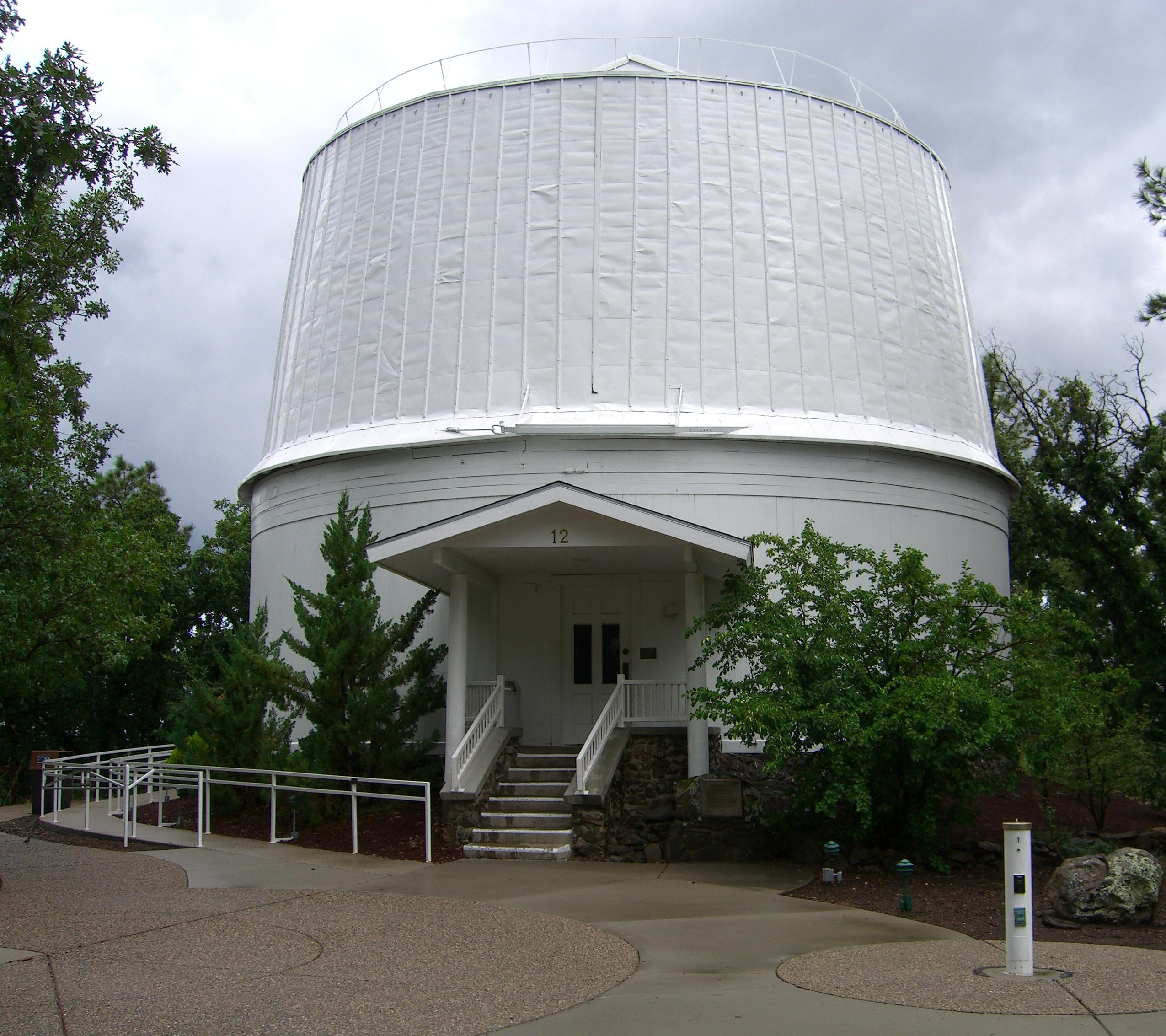
- The Clark Telescope Dome on Mars Hill
- Alternative names: Flagstaff Observatory
- Organization: Private institution
- Observatory code: 690
- Location: Flagstaff, Arizona
- Coordinates: 35°12′10″N 111°39′52″W
- Altitude: 2,210 m (7,250 ft)
- Established: 1894
- Website: lowell.edu

Telescopes
- Lowell Discovery Telescope: 4.28 m (169 in) telescope (located at Happy Jack, Arizona)
- Perkins Telescope: 180 cm (72 in) cassegrain telescope (located at Anderson Mesa)
- John S. Hall Telescope: 110 cm (42 in) Ritchey-Chretien telescope (located at Anderson Mesa)
- Unnamed telescope: 79 cm (31 in) reflecting telescope (located at Anderson Mesa)
- LONEOS Schmidt Telescope: 64 cm (25 in) catadioptric (located at Anderson Mesa)
- 24-inch Clark Telescope: 61 cm (24 in) Alvan Clark refractor
- Unnamed telescope: 53 cm (21 in) reflecting telescope
- Unnamed telescope: 46 cm (18 in) astrograph
- Dyer Telescope: 61 cm (24 in) PlaneWave CDK telescope
- Abbot L. Lowell Astrograph (Pluto Discovery Telescope): 33 cm (13 in) astrograph
- Planet Search Survey Telescope: (located at Anderson Mesa)
- Navy Precision Optical Interferometer: six-aperture astronomical interferometer with baselines up to 437 m (1,434 ft) (located at Anderson Mesa, operated in partnership with the USNO (through NOFS) and the NRL)
- Lowell Observatory
- U.S. National Register of Historic Places
- U.S. National Historic Landmark
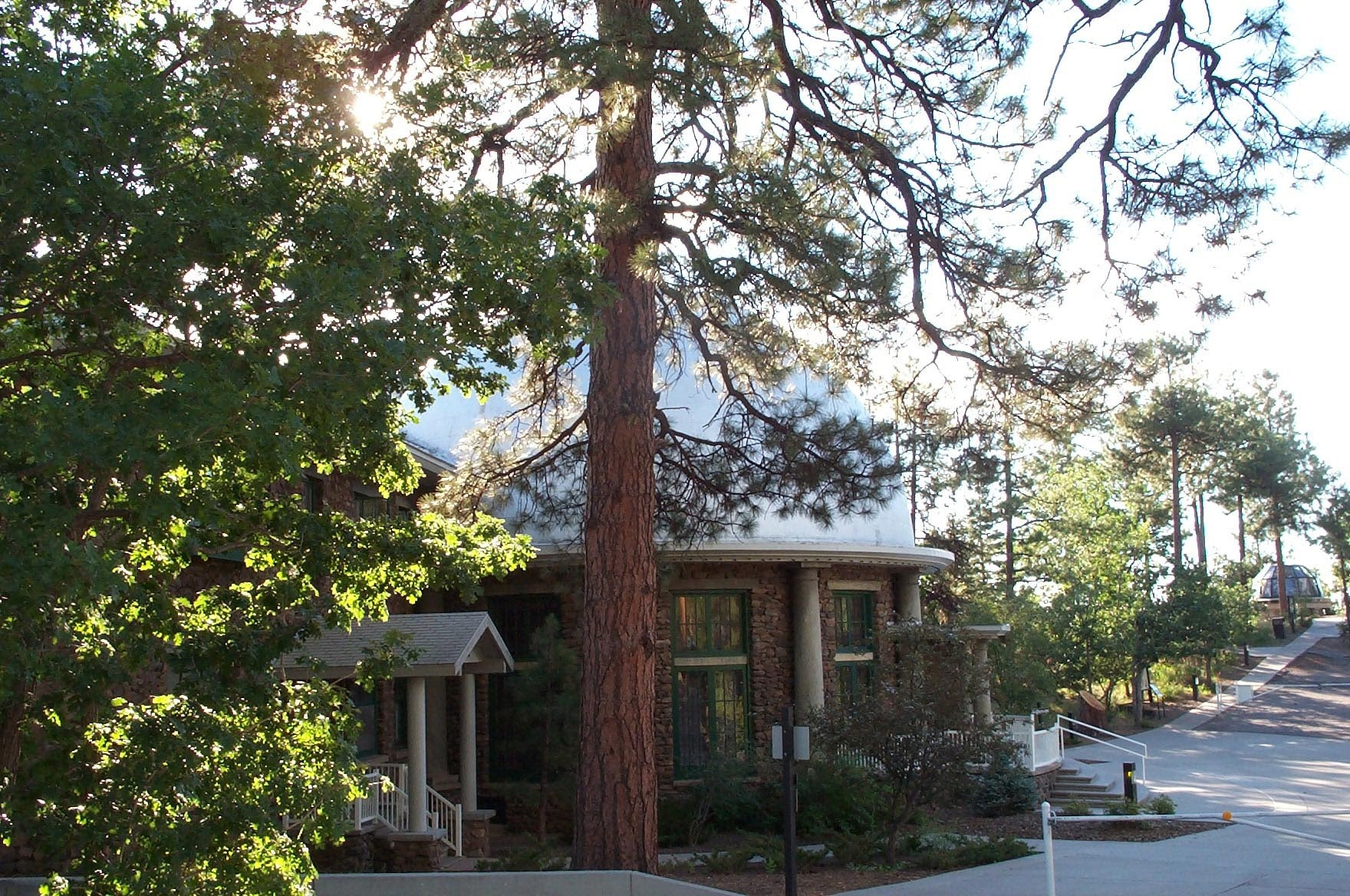
- The Slipher Rotunda Museum at Lowell Observatory

- Location within Arizona Location within the United States
- Built: 1894
- MPS: Flagstaff MRA (AD)
- NRHP reference No.: 66000172
Significant dates
- Added to NRHP: October 15, 1966
- Designated NHL: December 21, 1965
- Related media on Commons

Lowell Observatory is an astronomical observatory in Flagstaff, Arizona, United States. Lowell Observatory was established in 1894, placing it among the oldest observatories in the United States, and was designated a National Historic Landmark in 1965. In 2011, the Observatory was named one of "The World's 100 Most Important Places" by Time magazine. It was at the Lowell Observatory that the dwarf planet Pluto was discovered in 1930 by Clyde Tombaugh. Lowell is home to a 24-inch Clark Refracting Telescope, built in 1896, which is still in use today for public observing. Lowell sees over 150,000 annual visitors and is active in exoplanet and minor planet research.

The observatory was founded by astronomer Percival Lowell of Boston's Lowell family and is overseen by a sole trustee, a position historically handed down through the family. The first trustee was Lowell's third cousin Guy Lowell (1916–1927). Percival's nephew Roger Putnam served from 1927 to 1967, followed by Roger's son Michael (1967–1987), Michael's brother William Lowell Putnam III (1987–2013), and current trustee W. Lowell Putnam. The trustee appoints an Executive Director to oversee operations of the observatory, and consults with an advisory board. The current Director is Dr. Amanda Bosh.

Multiple astronauts attended the Lowell Observatory in 1963 while the Moon was being mapped for the Apollo Program, and many observed through the Clark Telescope.

== History ==
=== Founding in 1894 ===
In 1877 the Italian astronomer Giovanni Schiaparelli purported to have discovered a series of Martian canals. Percival Lowell had seen these drawings and was fascinated by the idea of artificial canals in Mars. In the winter of 1893, he devoted to use his wealth and connections to establish an observatory in the US. His wealth stemmed from his connection to the influential Boston Lowell family and his successful career as an investment banker. Lowell hired American astronomer Andrew E. Douglass to find a suitable location for the observatory, and in 1894, they agreed to build it in Flagstaff, Arizona due to its elevation, dark night skies, and proximity to the railroad. The materials for the construction of the observatory were all sourced locally, but the Clark Refracting Telescope was assembled in Boston. Funds for the observatory were provided by Percival Lowell himself, including staff salaries.

Much of the early research was carried out or overseen by Vesto Melvin Slipher. V.M. Slipher began his career at Lowell in 1901 as a temporary observing assistant. He proved his talent quickly, becoming the Assistant Director in 1915, Interim Director in 1916 after Percival Lowell's passing, and full Observatory Director from 1926 to 1954. While initially hired to study the planets, Slipher carried out careful work that laid the groundwork for observational cosmology. This included the discovery of galaxy recession, galaxy rotation, and of the first spectra of a Seyfert galaxy in M77. His data on the radial velocity of 45 galaxies was used by Sir Arthur Eddington in the development of General Relativity and used by Edwin Hubble to explain the expansion of the universe. Slipher was perhaps the best spectrographer of the era. He observed the spectral lines of methane and ammonia in the ice giants, attempted to find water and chlorophyll on Mars, and measured the rotation of Venus and Uranus. Vesto discovered the nature of the Pleiades and ρ Ophiuchi as reflection nebulae, which he considered his greatest contribution to astronomy. He was the first to observe oxygen and nitrogen in Earth's aurorae and took early spectra on supernovae remnants. As director, he oversaw the Trans Neptunian survey that culminated in the discovery of Pluto by Clyde Tombaugh. Vesto Slipher's research and administrative acuity shaped the path of Lowell Observatory for the decades to come.

==== List of Lowell Observatory directors ====
- Percival Lowell: 1894 – 1916
- Vesto Slipher: 1916 – 1954
- Albert G. Wilson: 1954 – 1958
- John S. Hall: 1958 – 1977
- Arthur Hoag: 1977 – 1989
- Bob Millis: 1989 – 2009
- Jeff Hall: 2009 – 2024
- Amanda Bosh: 2024 – Current

=== Historical research ===
==== Martian canals ====
Percival Lowell became one of the major proponents of the existence of Martian Canals, which he believed were evidence of life on Mars. Lowell began observing Mars in Flagstaff in 1894 using borrowed instruments. In 1895, he ordered the construction of a new instrument, a 24-inch refractor designed by Alvan Clark and Sons. Over the next decades he built up a body of work including sketches, maps, hand-drawn globes, and eventually photographs taken by Earl C. Slipher. In all his observations, Lowell perceived recurring, linear features that he interpreted to be artificial water canals. Lowell invited guests to view Mars, many of them also saw canals. He published three books on the subject: Mars (1895), Mars and Its Canals (1906), and Mars As the Abode of Life (1908). Percival's views on the subject caused much controversy among professional astronomers and stirred interest among the public. It appears that the canals were natural features that the human eye connects into linear features, such as hilltops and dust-strewn landscapes.

Lowell Observatory was featured in an episode of Carl Sagan's Cosmos series, titled Blue for a Red Planet. The episode begins with early speculations about Mars by Giovanni Schiaparelli and Percival Lowell and progresses to the robotic explorations of the planet.

Several Martian craters are named after Lowell staff, including Lowell, Slipher, Lampland, and Douglass.

==== The search for Planet X ====
After the discovery of Neptune in 1846 through mathematical calculation, astronomers speculated about the existence another planet beyond Neptune based on observed perturbations in Uranus' orbit. Percival expressed interest in the problem in his 1903 book, The Solar System, and began an effort to discover this unknown planet, which he dubbed 'Planet X'. Trained as a Harvard mathematician, he began calculations of likely locations of Planet X. Soon, he hired computers to aide in this effort, led by Elizebeth Williams. The first search lasted from 1905 to 1909 using the 24-inch Clark Telescope, with no success. In 1910, the observatory dedicated more resources to the search as a rival astronomer, William Henry Pickering of the Harvard College Observatory, published an orbit and position of a theoretical trans-Neptunian planet. From 1910 to his death in 1916, Percival dedicated much of his time to the search for Planet X. At this time a 5-inch Brashear Lens and 9-inch telescope borrowed from the Swarthmore Observatory were employed. In 1915, he published A Memoir on a Trans-Neptunian Planet, which included his best estimates of the possible locations of Planet X.

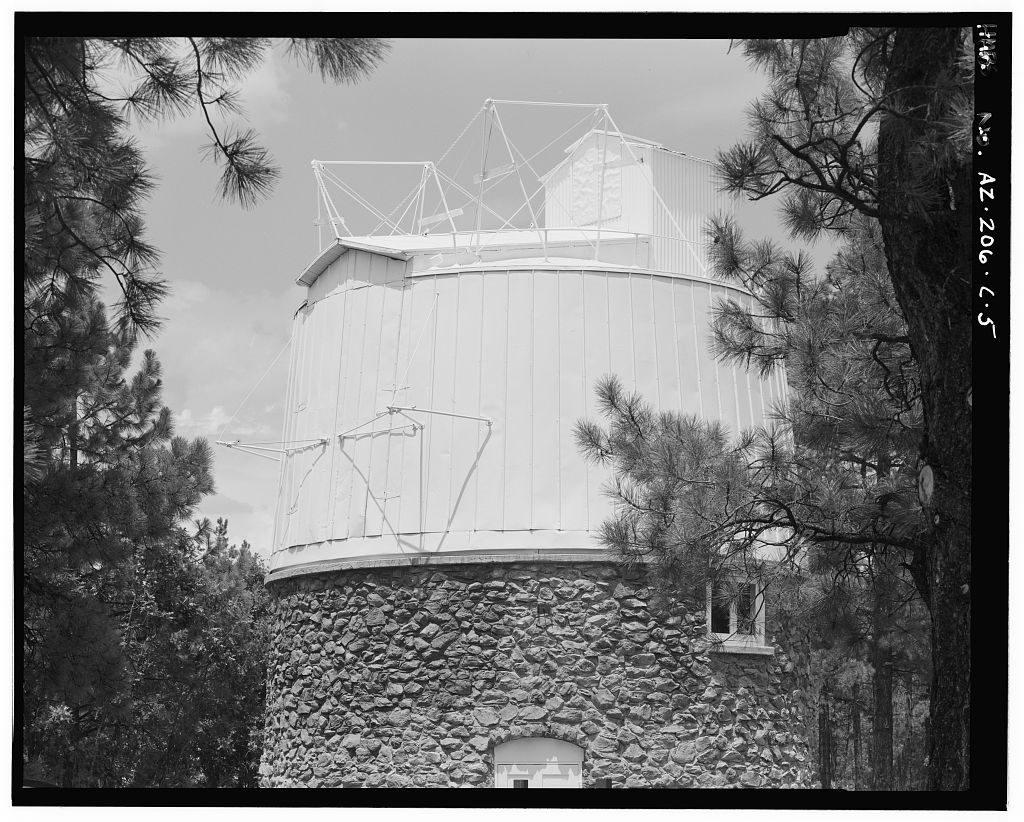
Pluto Dome housing the 13-inch astrograph, built in 1929.

In 1928, Percival's brother and President of Harvard, Abbott Lawerence Lowell, donated $10,000 for the construction of a new instrument to continue the search. This instrument would later be named the Pluto Discovery Astrograph, or Pluto Camera. Observatory Director Vesto Slipher hired Clyde Tombaugh to operate the astrograph and examine the plate photographs using a recently acquired Zeiss Blink Comparator. On 18 February 1930, Tombaugh was examining two plates taken on 23 January and 29 January and discovered Pluto.

==== Photoelectric photometry ====
The staff scientist Harold L. Johnson began a program of photoelectric photometry at Lowell during his tenure from 1952 to 1959. A 21-inch (53 cm) telescope was constructed at his request, allowing Johnson to refine the UBV photometric system with his collaborator, William Morgan. This system allows estimates of stellar ages, evolutions, and distances and is widely used today. In 1954, Johnson began a long-term project measuring Sunlight reflecting from Uranus, Neptune, and later Pluto. The intent was to study solar irradiance and seasonal changes on these planets. As a reference set, phometric measures of Sun-like stars were included. The project was later inherited by the astronomer Brian Skiff, who spent roughly 1,200 nights observing on the 21-inch. Skiff has continued this solar irradiance project through today.

==== Lunar mapping ====
In preparation for the Apollo Program, the United States Air Force's Aeronautical Chart and Information Center (ACIC) began mapping the surface of the Moon in 1959. Between 1961 and 1969, the ACIC established offices on Lowell Observatory's campus to make use of the 24-inch Clark Telescope. Dozens of scientists, photographers, and illustrators were involved, with notable contributions by the artist Patricia Bridges. A 20-inch (51 cm) refractor was constructed to accommodate these observers, now called the Apollo Telescope. Dozens of maps were completed, increasing our knowledge of lunar geology and allowing the first Moon landings.

==== Dark matter ====
Beginning in 1965, visiting astronomers Vera C. Rubin and Kent Ford of the Department of Terrestrial Magnetism (DTM) used Lowell Observatory's 72-inch Perkins Telescope and the KPNO 84-inch Telescope to investigate the rotation curves of galaxies. Using Kent Ford's spectrometer, Rubin confirmed the existence of dark matter. Their instrument still resides at Lowell Observatory in storage.

==== Proper motion survey ====
Working under the direction of Dr. Henry Giclas, observers Robert Burnham Jr. and Norman G. Thomas conducted a Proper Motion Survey using the 13-inch Pluto Discovery Astrograph from 1957 to 1981. This comprehensive survey produced positions, magnitudes, colors, and proper motions for thousands of stars. Burnham and Thomas discovered 5 comets, more than 1,500 asteroids, 9,000 high proper motion stars, 2,000 white dwarf candidates, and thousands of variable stars. Proper Motion Survey data is currently used to study stellar populations and orbits of minor planets. Robert Burnham is best known for his 2,138 page book, Burnham's Celestial Handbook, which remains a staple for amateur astronomers today.

==== NASA International Planetary Patrol Program ====
Lowell Observatory participated in the International Planetary Patrol Program from its formation in 1969 until 1990. Lowell scientist William A. Baum coordinated the activities of several observatories to continuously monitor the surface features and climactic changes on Mars, Jupiter, Venus, Saturn's moon Titan, and others. The Great Red Spot of Jupiter and the global dust storm on Mars that lasted from 1971 to 1973 received extensive coverage. Many of the observations conducted at Lowell used the 24-inch Clark Telescope.

==== LONEOS: Lowell Observatory Near Earth Object Search ====
The astronomer Ted Bowell directed a search for Near-Earth Objects from 1993 to 2008. The LONEOS team observed more than 5.2 millions asteroids and discovered 22,077 minor planets. Observers included Brian Skiff, Bill Ferris, Mike Van Ness, Shawn Hermann, Jason Sanborn, and others. The search was conducted using a 0.6-meter, f/1.8 Schmidt camera located at the Anderson Mesa Station.

==== Notable scientists ====
Notable Lowell Observatory Staff Members Past and Present
Name	Years Active at Lowell	Work
Vesto Melvin Slipher	1901 - 1958	Observatory Director, discovered galaxy recession
Carl O. Lampland	1902 - 1951	Planetary photography
Earl Carl Slipher	1906 - 1964	Planetary Photography, Mars
Elizabeth Williams	1905 - 1922	Calculator for Planet X Search
Clyde Tombaugh	1929 - 1945	Discovered Pluto
Henry Giclas	1931 - 1979	Oversaw Proper Motion Survey
Harold L. Johnson	1952 - 1959	Developed UBV photometric system
Robert Burnham Jr.	1958 - 1979	Observer for Proper Motion Survey
Otto Franz	1965 - Emeritus	Astrometry, Binary Stars
William A. Baum	1965 - 1990	Planetary Patrol Program
Leonard Martin	1960s - 1990s	Martian atmosphere and weather
Wes Lockwood	1972 - 2007	Solar-stellar photometry
Nat White	1973 - 2007	Stellar Occultation, Program Manager NPOI
Ted Bowell	1973 - 2011	Near Earth Object Survey
Larry Wasserman	1974 - Current	Kuiper Belt Objects, Minor Planets, Co-discoverer of Uranus' Rings
Brian Skiff	1976 - Current	Minor Planets, Stellar Photometry
Deidre Hunter	1986 - Current	Irregular Galaxies
Dave Scheicher	1986 - Current	Comets
Will Grundy	1997 - 2025	New Horizons Co-Investigator
Phil Massey	2000 - Current	Stellar Astrophysics, Wolf-Rayet Stars
Lisa Prato	2005 - 2025	Young Stellar Objects, Binary Stars
Stephen Levine	2010 - Current	Commisioning and Lead LDT Scientist
Gerard Van Belle	2011 - 2025	High Precision Interferometry, Director of NPOI
Nick Moskovitz	2014 - Current	Near Earth Objects, Meteors
Amanda Bosh	2020 - Current	Observatory Director, Co-discoverer of Pluto's atmosphere

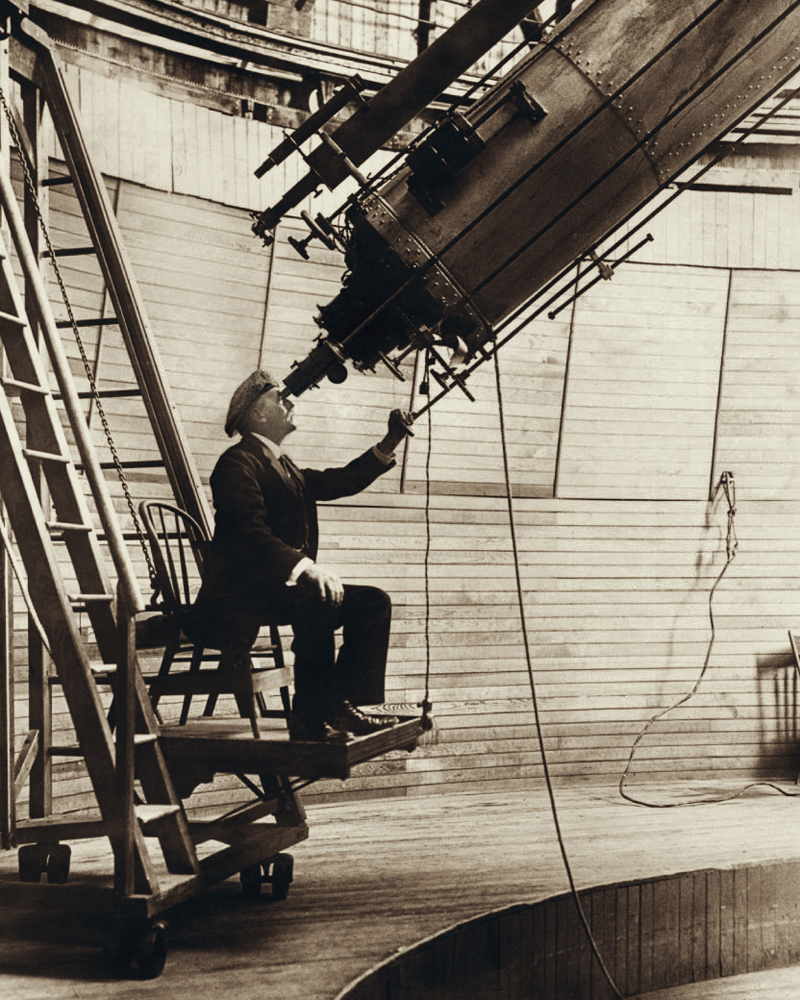
Percival Lowell in the observer's chair of the Clark 24-inch (61 cm) refractor observing Venus

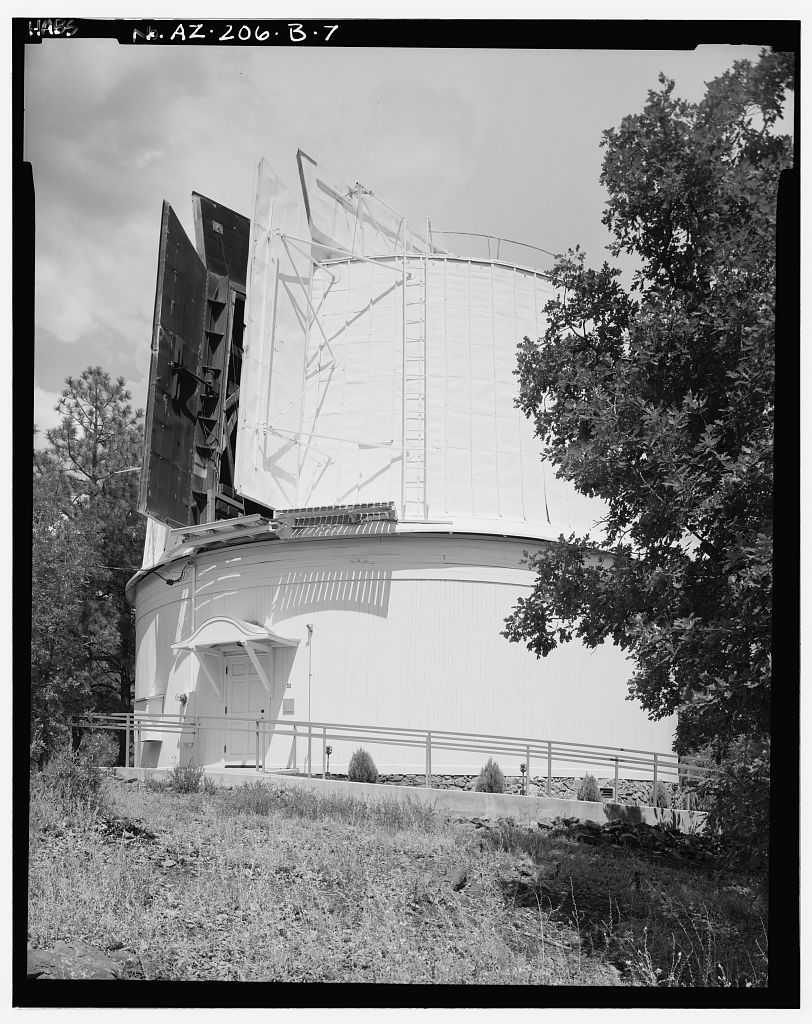
An image of the Clark Dome with its shutter doors opened from US Historic American Buildings Survey in 1994.

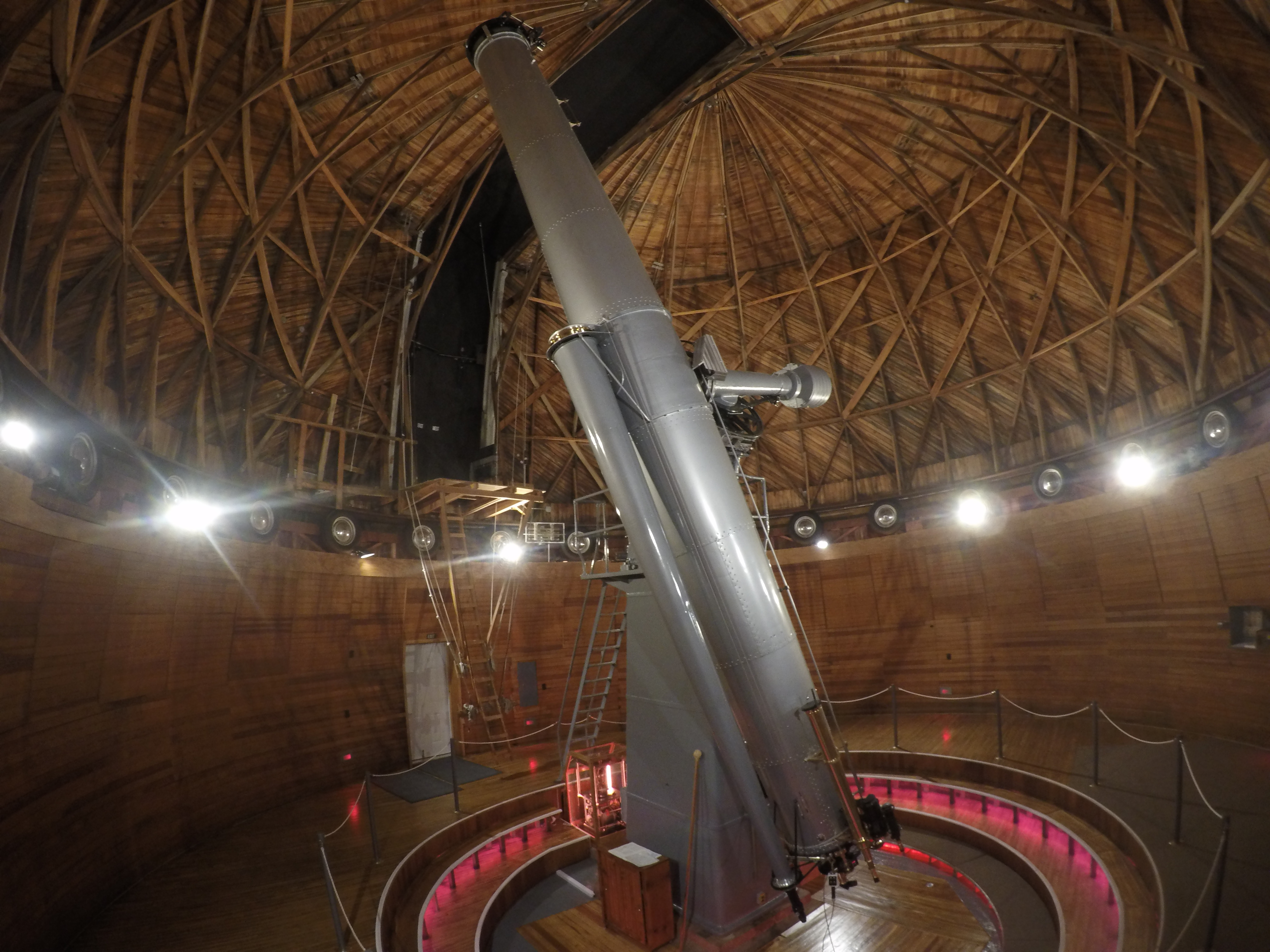
Historic Clark telescope installed in 1896, used to discover galaxy recession

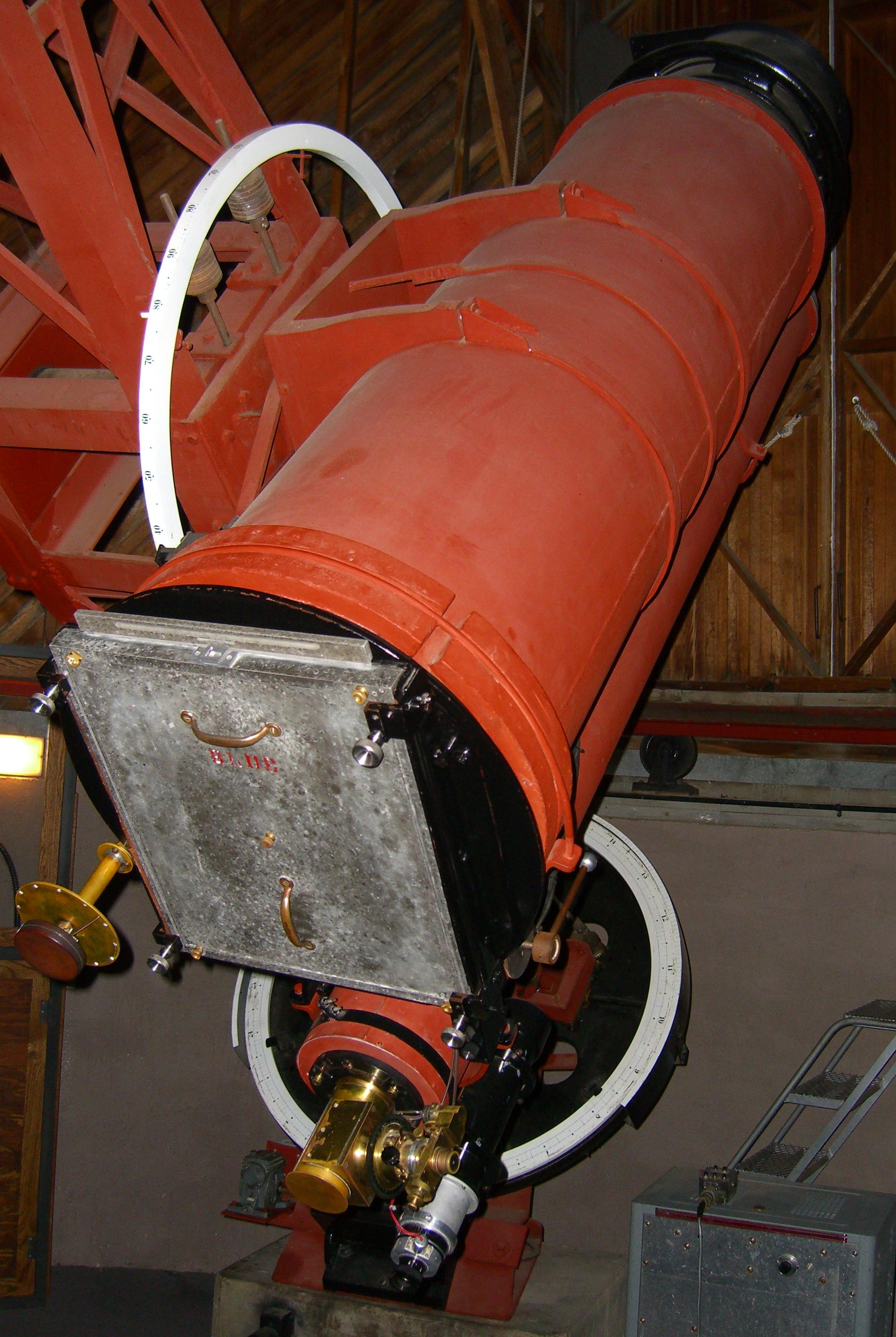
13-inch (33 cm) astrograph used to discover Pluto prior to restoration

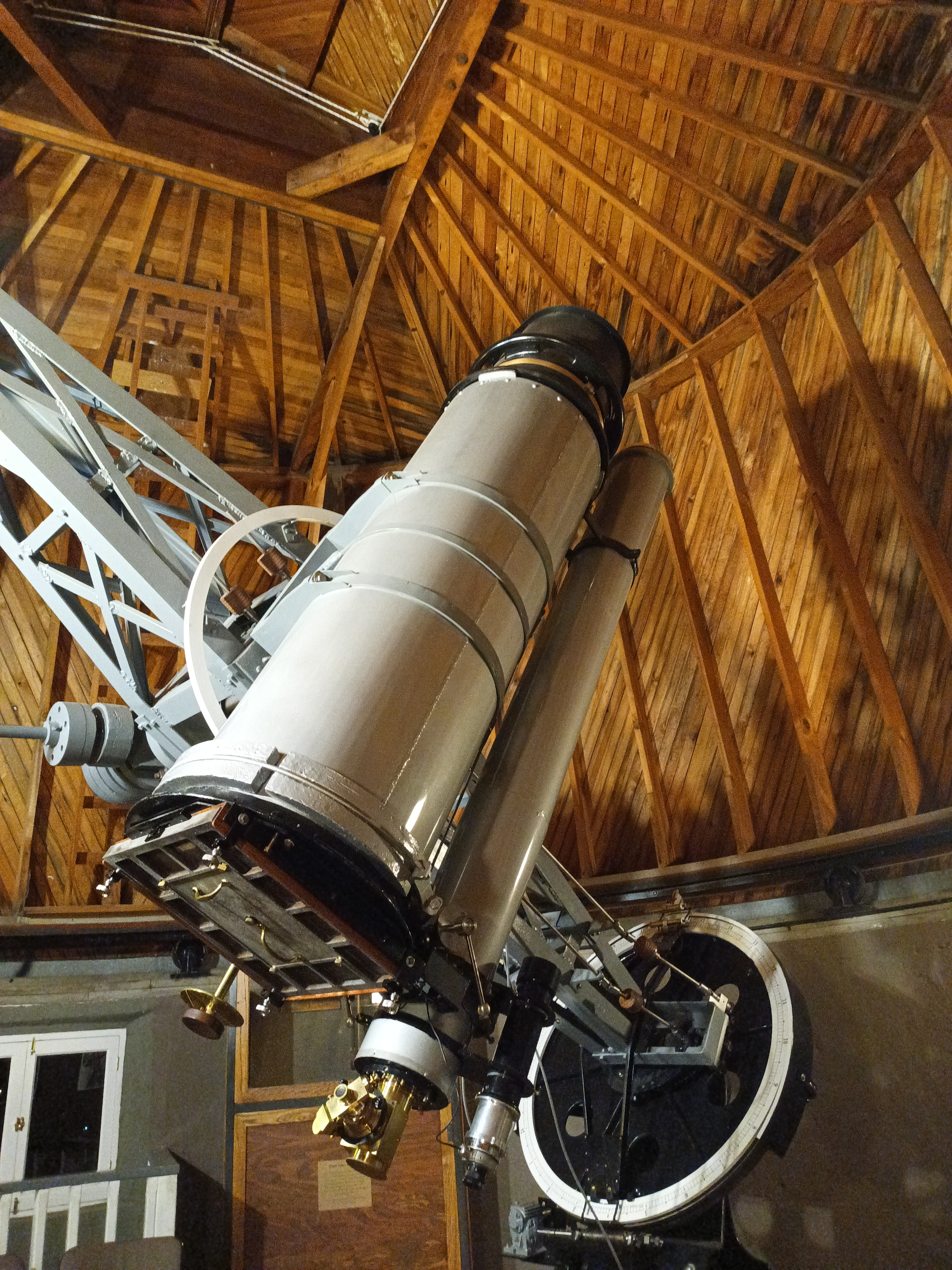
13-inch Pluto Astrograph after restoration in 2015

=== Current research ===
Lowell Observatory's astronomers conduct research on a wide range of solar system and astrophysical topics using ground-based, airborne, and space-based telescopes. Among the many current programs, a search for near-Earth asteroids, a survey of the Kuiper Belt beyond Neptune, a search for extrasolar planets, a decades-long study of the brightness stability of the Sun, and a variety of investigations of star formation and other processes in distant galaxies are notable. In addition, the Observatory staff designs and builds custom instrumentation for use on Lowell's telescopes and elsewhere. For example, Lowell staff built a sophisticated high-speed camera for use on the Stratospheric Observatory for Infrared Astronomy (SOFIA). SOFIA is a joint project of NASA and DLR, the German space agency, and consists of a 2.5-meter (8.2-foot) telescope on board a Boeing 747 SP.

Lowell astronomers, Nick Moskovitz, Brian Skiff, and Tom Polakis also contributed observations in NASA's Double Asteroid Redirection Test (DART) using both the 1.1-meter John Hall Telescope and 4.3-meter Lowell Discovery Telescope. This experiment is the world's first full-scale planetary defense test.

=== Public programs ===
In addition to research, Lowell Observatory has a large Public Programs department led by Director Todd Gonzales. Public Programs includes tours of campus, telescope observing, school camps, science talks, museums exhibits, and planetarium documentaries. Guests have access to an array of equipment, historical artifacts, and expertise.

In the 1960s through 1990s, tour guides included Brian Skiff and Robert Burnham Jr., who showed visitors around campus between their regular research duties.

In 1994, the Steele Visitor Center was constructed to accommodate a growing public interest in the observatory. Visitation grew quickly, and new facilities were opened in 2019 with the Giovale Open Deck Observatory and in 2024 with the Astronomy Discovery Center. Public Programs now receives about 150,000 visitors per year.

Around the year 2000, Dr. Amanda Bosh and Dr. Deidre Hunter began the Native American Astronomy Outreach Program (NAAOP). The program pairs scientists with elementary and secondary school teachers from Native American peoples around Northern Arizona to create STEM-centered curriculum. The intent is to encourage student's interest in science careers while supporting Native American educators.

Beginning in 2012, Lowell Observatory began offering camps for children known as Orbits Curiosity Camp. The first camp was established for elementary students. Later on, in 2013, they added an additional camp program for preschool children. The following year they added another program for middle school students. Kids have the opportunity to learn hands-on about science, technology, engineering, and math (STEM) through a variety of activities that include games, experiments, story time, art, music, and more.

In 2015, the historical Clark Telescope was in need of restoration because it risked permanent closure due to poorly functioning components and structural elements. Major donors for the project included the philanthropist Joe Orr and the Toomey Foundation for the Natural Sciences, as well as many individual and group contributions. Funds totaled nearly $300,000. Lowell began a 20-month refurbishment of both the Clark Telescope and the Pluto Discovery Telescope, led by the Director of Technical Services, Ralph Nye. The team worked with the intent of maintaining historical value while ensuring proper function for another century of observing. Some parts had to be fabricated, but generally the team was able to clean, repair, and reuse the majority of the originals. Ralph Nye made measurements of the Alvin Clark 24-inch lenses and found they were in nearly the same condition as when ground and polished in 1896, Nye determined they were optically perfect. Restoration was completed in August 2015, the Clark Telescope is now open for public viewing on a regular basis.

In 2016, Kevin Schindler published Lowell Observatory, a 128-page book containing over 200 captions and pictures. Arcadia Publishing's Images of America included it in their series, which increased the enthusiasm of space in the public. The book itself features the popular reputation of Lowell Observatory, encompassing the revolutionary research of scientists and how they contributed to the field of astronomy.

== Exhibits ==
- The Astronomy Discovery Center: The Astronomy Discovery Center (ADC) is Lowell Observatory's newest facility. It is a 40,000 square foot science center with two exhibit galleries, a 180-seat theater with a curved LED screen, roof top stargazing and venue space, a cafe, and giftshop. The ADC was constructed to accommodate publicly accessible science. Lowell Observatory functions as a research facility and has expanded its public program operations.
- The Rotunda Museum: Built in 1916, the Rotunda Museum is used by the observatory as a library and collection area for artifacts. It features displays that discuss the Lowell family history and the discoveries made at the observatory. It also houses many different measuring tools including the Blink Comparator used to discover Pluto.
- Putnam Collection Center: The Putnam Collection Center is open to the public once per day during a guided tour of the facility. The Center highlights the Observatories history and features artifacts from Lowell's past, including the spectrograph used by VM Slipher. Guests may view 'Big Red' here, which was Percival Lowell's 1911 Stevens-Duryea motorized vehicle.

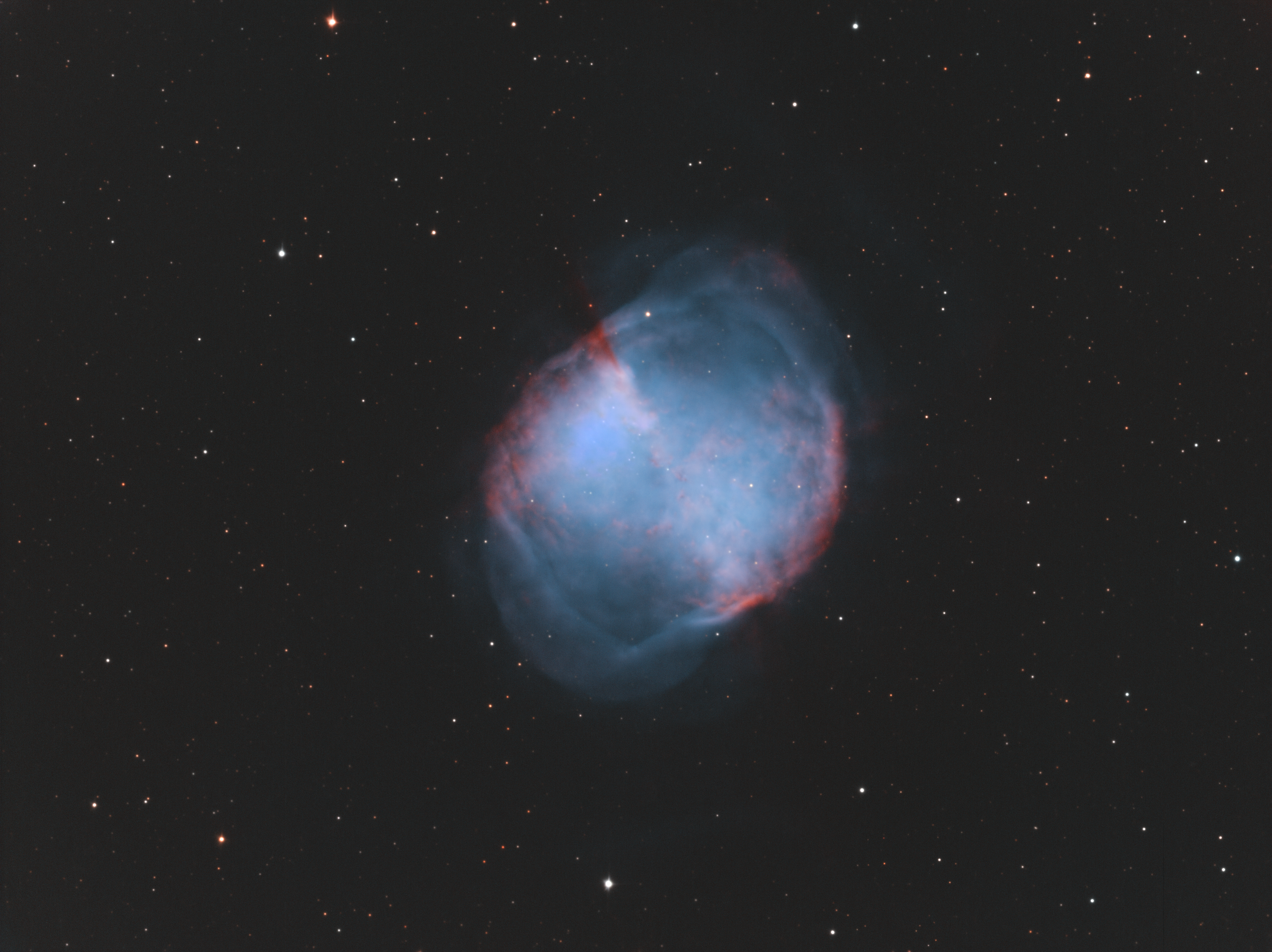
An image of Messier 27 taken during one of Lowell Observatory's weekly Astrophotography Classes using their 17-inch PlaneWave Astrograph. HOO narrowband palette is used.

== Telescopes and interior ==
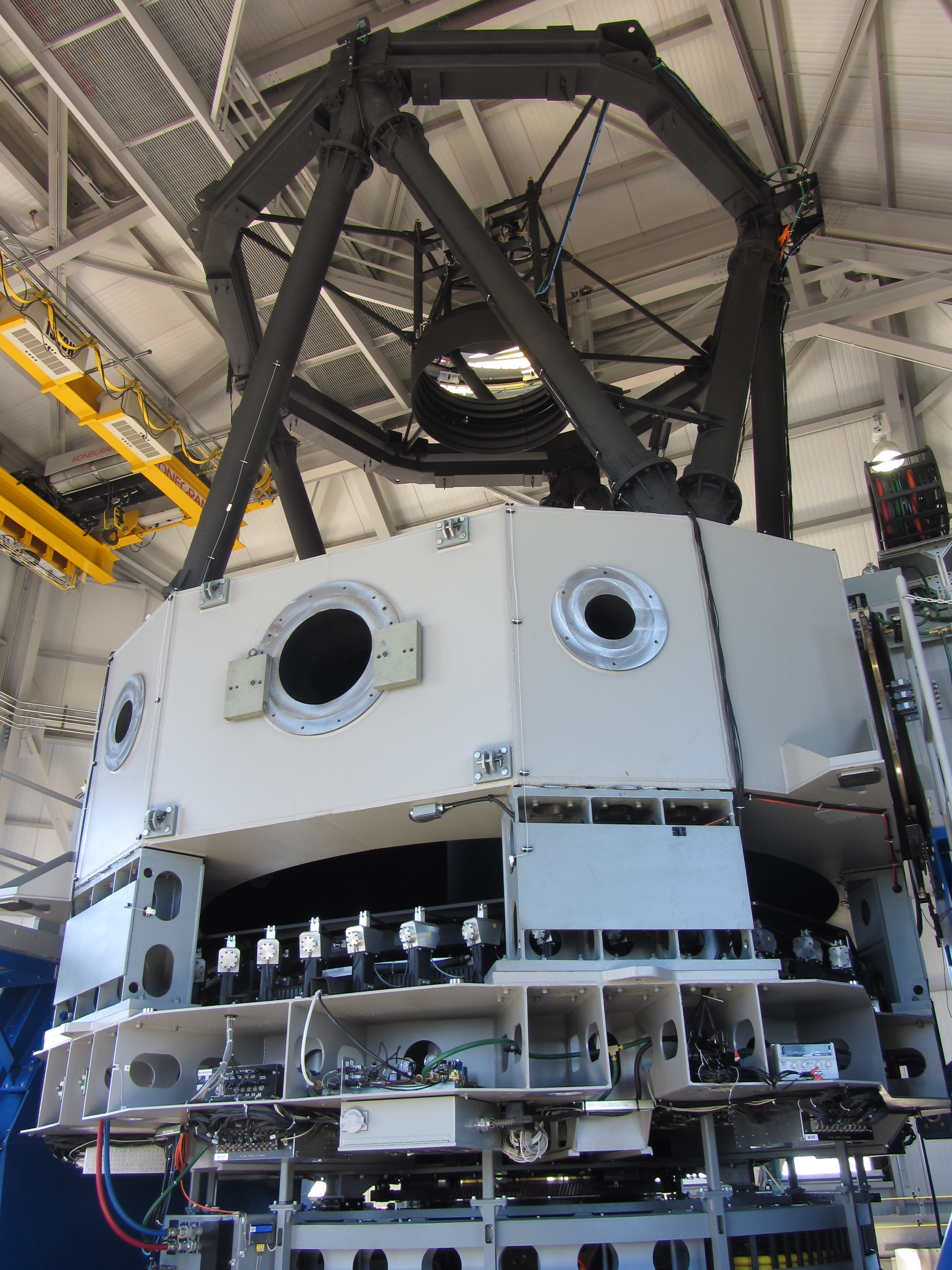
Lowell Discovery Telescope

=== Lowell Discovery Telescope ===
Lowell Observatory owns and operates the Lowell Discovery Telescope (LDT, formerly the Discovery Channel Telescope) located near Happy Jack, Arizona. This 4.3-meter reflecting telescope is the fifth-largest telescope in the contiguous United States and one of the most powerful in the world, thanks to a unique instrument cube that can accommodate up to five instruments at the Ritchey-Chrétien focus, four via fold mirrors and another at the bore sight. The LDT can switch between any of these instruments in about a minute by placing or removing these fold mirrors in the optical path of the instrument cube, making it uniquely suited for time-domain programs as well as opportunity targets such as gamma ray bursts and supernovae.

The 6700-pound primary mirror measures 4.3 m (170 in) in diameter yet only about 10 cm (3.9 in) in thickness. This finely figured, thin meniscus mirror, held in shape by a 156-element active optics system, 120 lateral pistons and 36 lateral supports, regularly delivering sub-arcsecond seeing. The mirror was ground and polished into its hyperbolic shape at the Optical Fabrication and Engineering Facility of the College of Optical Sciences of the University of Arizona in Tucson.

The LDT is housed in a 73-foot-tall, 62-foot-diameter metal dome located at an elevation of 7,800 feet (2,400 m) and about 40 miles (64 km) southeast of Flagstaff. Groundbreaking for the facility occurred on July 11, 2005. A little over six years later, the first image from just the primary mirror was recorded, using a small test camera mounted where the secondary mirror would eventually go. The secondary mirror was installed in January 2012. To celebrate first light, Lowell hosted a gala celebration on July 21, 2012, featuring a keynote address by Neil Armstrong. This was his final public appearance before his death several weeks later.

The telescope is named for the Discovery Channel television network. Discovery founder and CEO John Hendricks has long been a member of Lowell Observatory's Advisory Board, and Discovery and John and his wife Maureen made gifts of $16 million toward the $53 million cost of the project. These were gifts, not purchases: Discovery has no ownership in the telescope, nor any direction of the research conducted with it. In return for their contributions, they received naming rights and first right of refusal for use of images in educational broadcasts. Research use proceeds as it would at any other professional telescope.

Boston University, the University of Maryland, the University of Toledo, Northern Arizona University, and Yale University have joined Lowell as partners with access to DCT.

=== Giovale Open Deck Observatory (GODO) ===
Installed in 2019 using donations from a variety of sources, such as the Giovale family, the Open Deck Observatory houses six telescopes used for public programs. Telescopes are permanently mounted into vibrationally isolated concrete piers. An arched clamshell roof and walls rest on railroad tracks to cover the telescopes which can be rolled-back using electric motors.

==== Permanently mounted telescopes at the GODO ====
- 5.5-inch TEC apochromatic refractor
- 8-inch Moonraker 'Victorian' achromatic refractor
- 32-inch Starstructure reflector
- 14-inch Celestron EdgeHD SCT
- 14-inch PlaneWave astrograph
- 17-inch PlaneWave astrograph

==== Other GODO telescopes ====
- 100 mm Lunt Hα solar telescope
- 8-inch Orion reflector
- Two 12-inch Teeter reflectors
- 16-inch Teeter reflector
- 16-inch Meade SCT

=== The Dyer Telescope ===
Housed in its own aluminum dome, this 24-inch (61 cm) PlaneWave CDK catadioptric reflector is used for nightly private observing events. An educator guides guests through views of galaxies, clusters, planets, and nebulae over the course of an hour and fifteen minutes. The dome was once called the McAllister Dome, housing a 16-inch Boller and Chivens cassegrain telescope from 1963. The McAllister telescope was used for public viewings beginning in 1999 before falling into disrepair. Funds for a new telescope were given in honor of Brian Dyer. In the future the Dyer will be equipped with scientific instrumentation.

=== Other ===
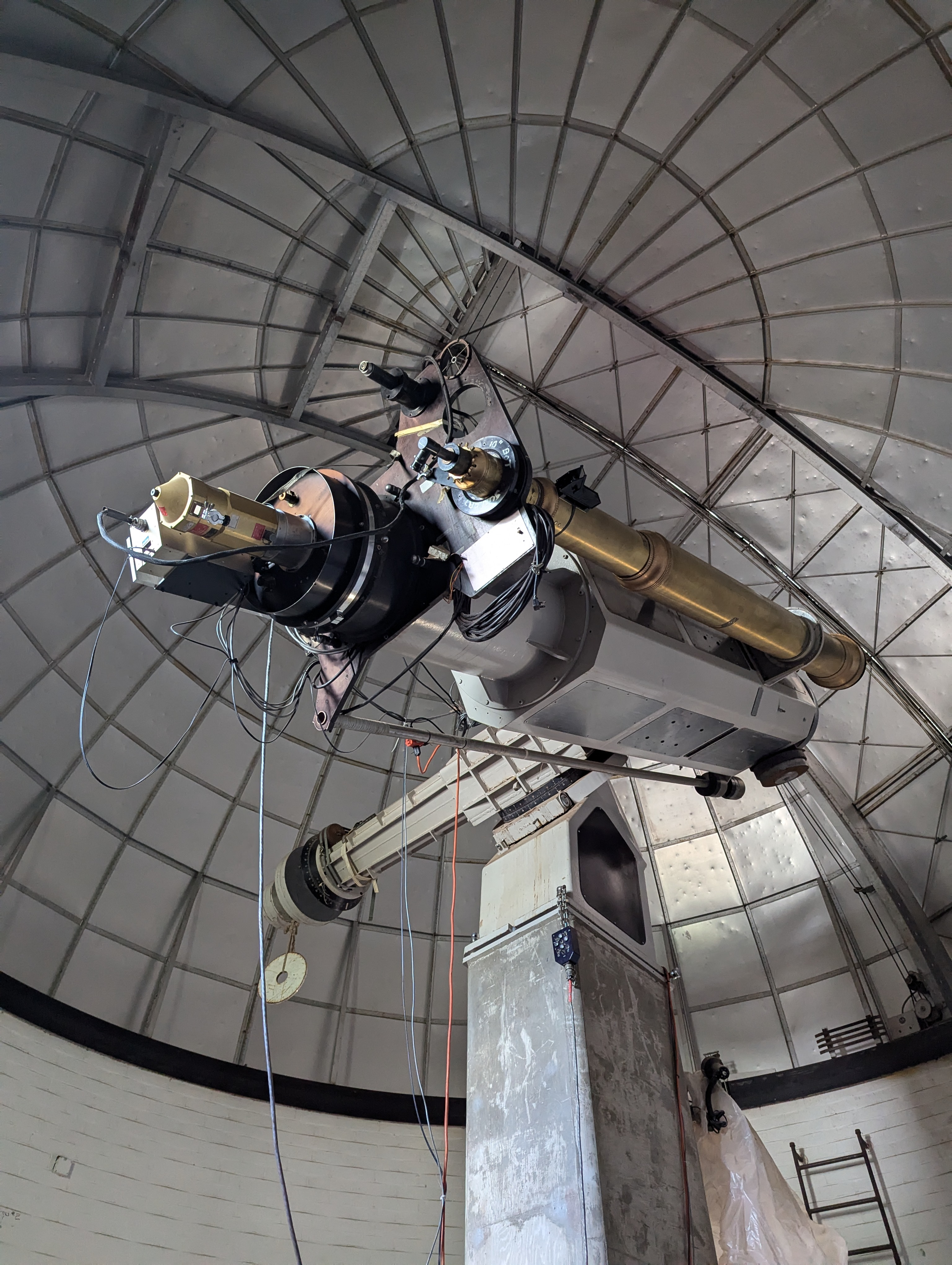
The Apollo 20-inch (50 cm) refractor used by Lowell Observatory and ACIC for the Lunar Mapping project.

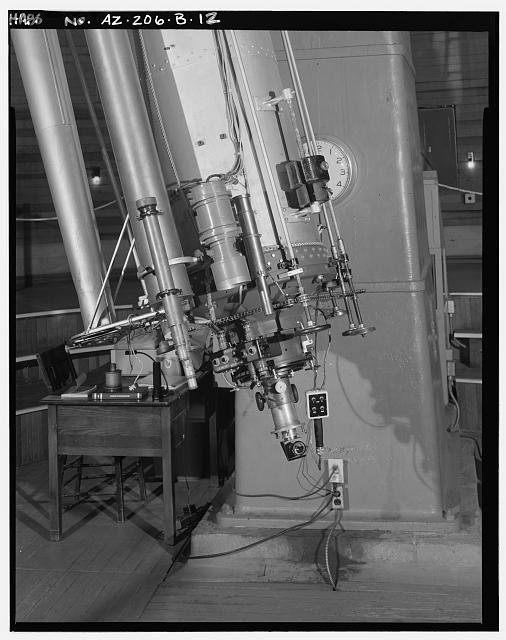
A detailed view of the Clark Telescope's control mechanisms.

The observatory operates several telescopes at three locations in the Flagstaff area. The main facility, located on Mars Hill just west of downtown Flagstaff, houses the original 61-centimeter (24-inch) Clark Refracting Telescope, which is now used for public education, with 150,000+ annual visitors. The telescope, built in 1896 for $20,000, was assembled in Boston by Alvan Clark & Sons and then shipped by train to Flagstaff. The Apollo Telescope, a 51 cm (20-inch) refractor, used for the Lunar Mapping project is on Mars Hill but has been decommissioned. Also on display is the 33-centimeter (13-inch) Pluto Discovery Telescope, used by Clyde Tombaugh in 1930 to discover the dwarf planet Pluto.

In 2014, the 8,000 square feet (740 m^{2}) Putnam Center was opened. This observatory included many rooms with tools that were useful to observers including a library for research, a room for processing photographic glass plates, multiple antique instruments used by previous astronomers, and many artifacts. The observatory does contain areas that are closed to the public view, although there are multiple places that tourists are welcome to visit.

Lowell Observatory has operated four research telescopes at its Anderson Mesa dark-sky site, located 20 km (12 mi) southeast of Flagstaff, including the 180-centimeter (72-inch) Perkins Telescope (in partnership with Boston University) and the 110-centimeter (42-inch) John S. Hall Telescope. Lowell is a partner with the United States Naval Observatory and Naval Research Laboratory in the Navy Precision Optical Interferometer (NPOI), also located at that site.

The Observatory also operates smaller research telescopes at its historic site on Mars Hill and in Australia and Chile.

Past Anderson Mesa, on the peak of Happy Jack, Lowell Observatory built the 4.28-meter (169-inch) Lowell Discovery Telescope in partnership with Discovery Communications, Inc.

=== Notable discoveries ===
- The dwarf planet Pluto by Clyde Tombaugh in 1930
- One of the largest known structures, the billion lightyear long Perseus-Pegasus Filament
- Large recessional velocities of galaxies by Vesto Melvin Slipher between 1912 and 1914 (that led ultimately to the realization our universe is expanding)
- Co-discovery of the rings of Uranus in 1977
- The periodic variation in the activity of Comet Halley during the 1985/1986 apparition
- The three largest known stars
- The atmosphere of Pluto
- Accurate orbits for two of Pluto's moons: Nix and Hydra
- Oxygen on Jupiter's satellite Ganymede
- Carbon dioxide ice on three Uranian satellites
- The first Trojan of Neptune
- Evidence that the atmosphere of HD 209458 b contains water vapor

== See also ==
- List of astronomical observatories
- List of largest optical telescopes in the continental United States
