= International Planetary Patrol Program =

The NASA International Planetary Patrol Program consists of a network of astronomical observatories to collect uninterrupted images and observations of the large-scale atmospheric and surface features of the planets. This group was established in 1969, and consisted of the Mauna Kea Observatory, the Mount Stromlo Observatory, the Perth Observatory, the Republic Observatory, the Cerro Tololo Inter-American Observatory, the Magdalena Peak Station of the New Mexico State University, and the Lowell Observatory. The activities were coordinated by William A. Baum of Lowell Observatory. In the years from 1975 to 1981 the San Vittore Observatory (Bologna) Italy also participated with observations of Mars, Jupiter and Saturn.

For Mars, they monitored clouds and dust storms, as well as the seasonal fluctuations in the climate. The martian dust storms of 1971 and 1973 were extensively covered. They also observed changes in the Jovian atmosphere, including the Great Red Spot. Venus has been monitored for circulation of the cloud deck.

== See also ==
- List of astronomical societies
