= Lowell Discovery Telescope =

Lowell Observatory aperture telescope

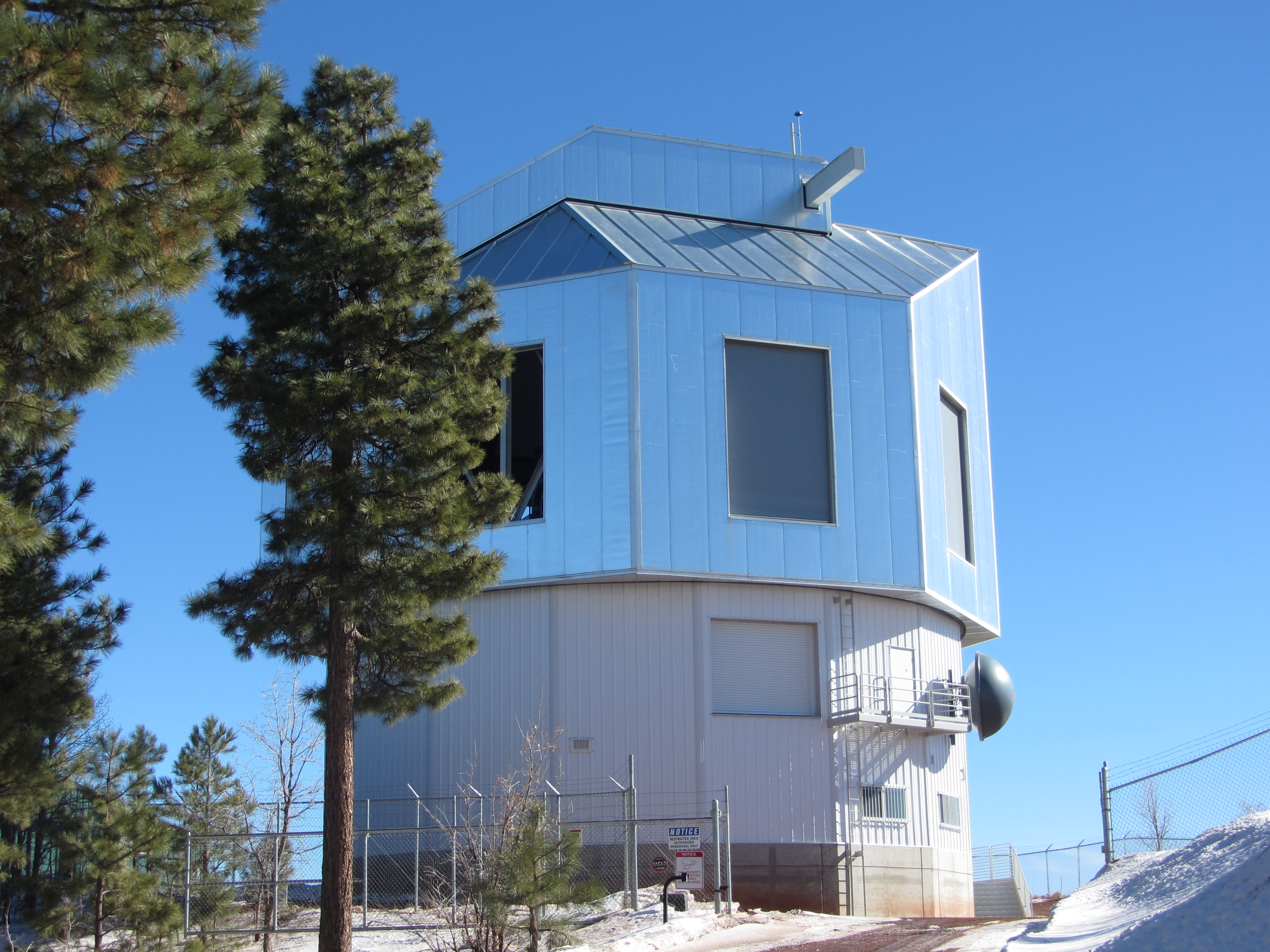
- The dome of Discovery Channel Telescope
- Alternative names: DCT
- Location: Arizona
- Coordinates: 34°44′40″N 111°25′19″W
- Altitude: 2,360 m (7,740 ft)
- Diameter: 4.3 m (14 ft 1 in)
- Secondary diameter: 1.4 m (4 ft 7 in)
- Website: lowell.edu/research/research-facilities/4-3-meter-dct/
- Location within the United States
- Related media on Commons

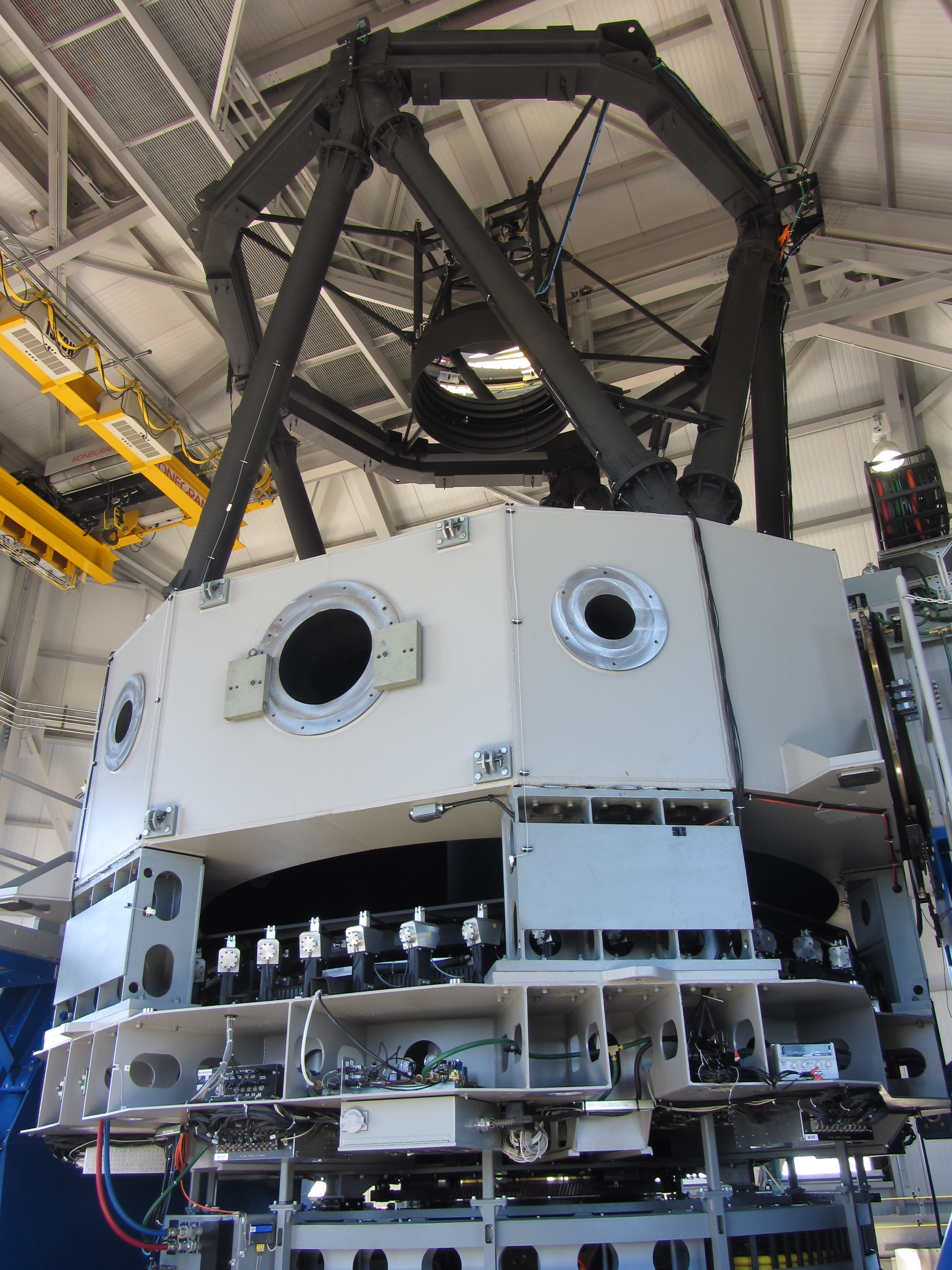
Discovery Channel Telescope

The Lowell Discovery Telescope (LDT), formerly the Discovery Channel Telescope (DCT), is a 4.3 m (170 in) aperture telescope owned and operated by Lowell Observatory. The LDT was built at a dark sky site in the Coconino National Forest near Happy Jack, Arizona. Happy Jack is located at an elevation of 2,360 m (7,740 ft) and is approximately 65 km (40 mi) south-south-east of Flagstaff. The project was initially a partnership between Discovery Communications and Lowell Observatory. The research partnerships have been extended to include Boston University, The University of Maryland, The University of Toledo, Northern Arizona University, and Yale University. The telescope cost $53 million. It significantly augments Lowell Observatory's observational capability and enables pioneering studies in a number of important research areas.

With its 4-meter class primary mirror, the Lowell Discovery Telescope is the fifth largest optical telescope in the continental United States (as of 2026).

Final construction of the telescope was completed by February 2012 and first light images were taken in April 2012.

== Telescope ==
The LDT uses a Ritchey–Chrétien design with an f/1.9 primary mirror. The 6700-pound primary mirror measures 4.3 m (170 in) in diameter yet only about 10 cm (3.9 in) in thickness. This finely figured, thin meniscus mirror, held in shape by a 156-element active optics system, regularly delivers sub-arcsecond seeing. The mirror was ground and polished into its hyperbolic shape at the Optical Engineering and Fabrication Facility of the University of Arizona College of Optical Sciences (in Tucson, Arizona). The telescope is one of the most powerful in the world, thanks to a unique housing that can accommodate up to five instruments at the Ritchey-Chrétien focus. The LDT can switch between any of these instruments in about a minute, making it uniquely suited for time-domain programs as well as opportunity targets such as gamma ray bursts and supernovae.

== Construction ==
Lowell Observatory and Discovery Communications formed a partnership to build the Discovery Channel Telescope in February 2003. A special-use permit for construction and operation of the telescope at the Happy Jack site was received from the United States Forest Service in November 2004 and improvement of an existing road to the site commenced immediately. The primary mirror blank was completed by Corning in late 2005. Construction of the 26-meter-tall (85-foot), 19-meter-diameter (62-foot) telescope enclosure and an auxiliary support building began in mid-September 2005. Final figuring and polishing of the mirror, which weighs about 3,000 kg (6,700 lb), was completed by the University of Arizona's College of Optical Sciences. This process took about three years. The mirror was delivered to the site in June 2010, subsequently aluminized, and mounted on the telescope in August 2011. The telescope saw first light in 2012 and it was fully operational that year. The telescope's mirror was only expected to be 4.2 m, but it turned out that a 4.3 m (14 ft) mirror could be used.

== Research ==
According to Director Jeffrey Hall, the telescope's original intent was for the study of comets, exoplanets, star formation in the Milky Way and other outer solar system projects. Other research includes observing the Kuiper belt, and exploring distant stars and galaxies. The telescope will make space exploration easier, more effective, and efficient for existing programs as well.

Initial Project Leaders include Dr. Jeffrey Hall, Director, Lowell Observatory; Dr. Stephen Levine, Commissioning Scientist; Bill DeGroff, Project Manager; Byron Smith, Project Manager; Dr. Edward Dunham, Instrument Manager; and Ralph Nye, Director of Technical Services.

P/2016 BA14 was identified as a comet using observations from the Discovery Channel Telescope. When the comet approached Earth within 2.2 million miles (about 9 lunar distances), the size of the nucleus to be calculated was 250 meters (820 feet) in diameter. The object was discovered by a PanSTARRS telescope, but not identified as a comet at that time.

In 2017, the LDT achieved 282 nights out of the year (365 days) of scheduled observations for science.

== Comparisons ==
Comparison of largest optical telescopes in continental United States
	Telescope	Size
1	Hobby-Eberly Telescope	10.0 m
2	Large Binocular Telescope twin	8.4 m
3	MMT	6.5 m
4	Hale	5.1 m
5	LDT	4.3 m

== See also ==
- Anderson Mesa Station
- EXPRES
- List of largest optical reflecting telescopes
- List of the largest optical telescopes in North America
- Lists of telescopes
