= Deidre Hunter =

American astrophysicist

Deidre A. Hunter is an American astronomer at Lowell Observatory. Her primary research area is tiny irregular galaxies — their origins, evolution and star-formation properties. She uses many parts of the electromagnetic spectrum, and includes spectroscopy in her approach.

== Education ==
Hunter's BS is from the University of Arizona (1975) and her PhD in astronomy from the University of Illinois Urbana-Champaign in 1982. Her thesis was on the star-forming properties of irregular galaxies. It earned an award from the Astronomical Society of the Pacific.

== Career ==
Hunter was a postdoctoral fellow at Kitt Peak National Observatory, after which she spent two years at the Department of Terrestrial Magnetism of the Carnegie Institution of Washington as the Richard B. Roberts fellow. She joined Lowell Observatory science staff in 1986 as well as the Hubble Space Telescope WFPC camera team. She mainly studies the behavior of tiny galaxies as Lowell's Deputy Director of Science. Hunter founded Lowell’s Navajo-Jopi Astronomy Outreach Program and ran it for 25 years, sharing astronomy with 4th-8th grade Navajo and Hopi teachers and their classes.

== Awards and honors ==
- Robert J. Trumpler Award for her thesis
- American Astronomical Society's 2014 Education Prize, partly for her involvement with Lowell's outreach program.
- Elected a Legacy Fellow of the American Astronomical Society in 2020.
- 165574 Deidre, asteroid

== Selected publications ==
- Elmegreen, Bruce G.; Hunter, Deidre A. (2010-03-20). "On the Disruption of Star Clusters in a Hierarchical Interstellar Medium". The Astrophysical Journal. 712 (1): 604–623. arXiv:1002.2823. Bibcode:2010ApJ...712..604E. doi:10.1088/0004-637X/712/1/604. ISSN 0004-637X. S2CID 119272466.
- Elmegreen, Bruce G.; Zhang, Hong-Xin; Hunter, Deidre A. (2012-03-10). "In-Spiraling Clumps in Blue Dompact Dwarf Galaxies". The Astrophysical Journal. 747 (2): 105. arXiv:1201.3658. Bibcode:2012ApJ...747..105E. doi:10.1088/0004-637X/747/2/105. ISSN 0004-637X. S2CID 67821084.
- Hunter, Deidre A.; Ficut-Vicas, Dana; Ashley, Trisha; Brinks, Elias; Cigan, Phil; Elmegreen, Bruce G.; Heesen, Volker; Herrmann, Kimberly A.; Johnson, Megan; Oh, Se-Heon; Rupen, Michael P. (2012-11-01). "Little Things". The Astronomical Journal. 144 (5): 134. arXiv:1208.5834. Bibcode:2012AJ....144..134H. doi:10.1088/0004-6256/144/5/134. ISSN 0004-6256. S2CID 118441588.
- Elmegreen, Bruce G.; Hunter, Deidre A. (2015-05-28). "A Star Formation Law for Dwarf Irregular Galaxies". The Astrophysical Journal. 805 (2): 145. arXiv:1503.04370. Bibcode:2015ApJ...805..145E. doi:10.1088/0004-637X/805/2/145. ISSN 1538-4357. S2CID 119285468.

== See also ==
- Dwarf galaxies
