= Mulberry, Indiana =

- Town
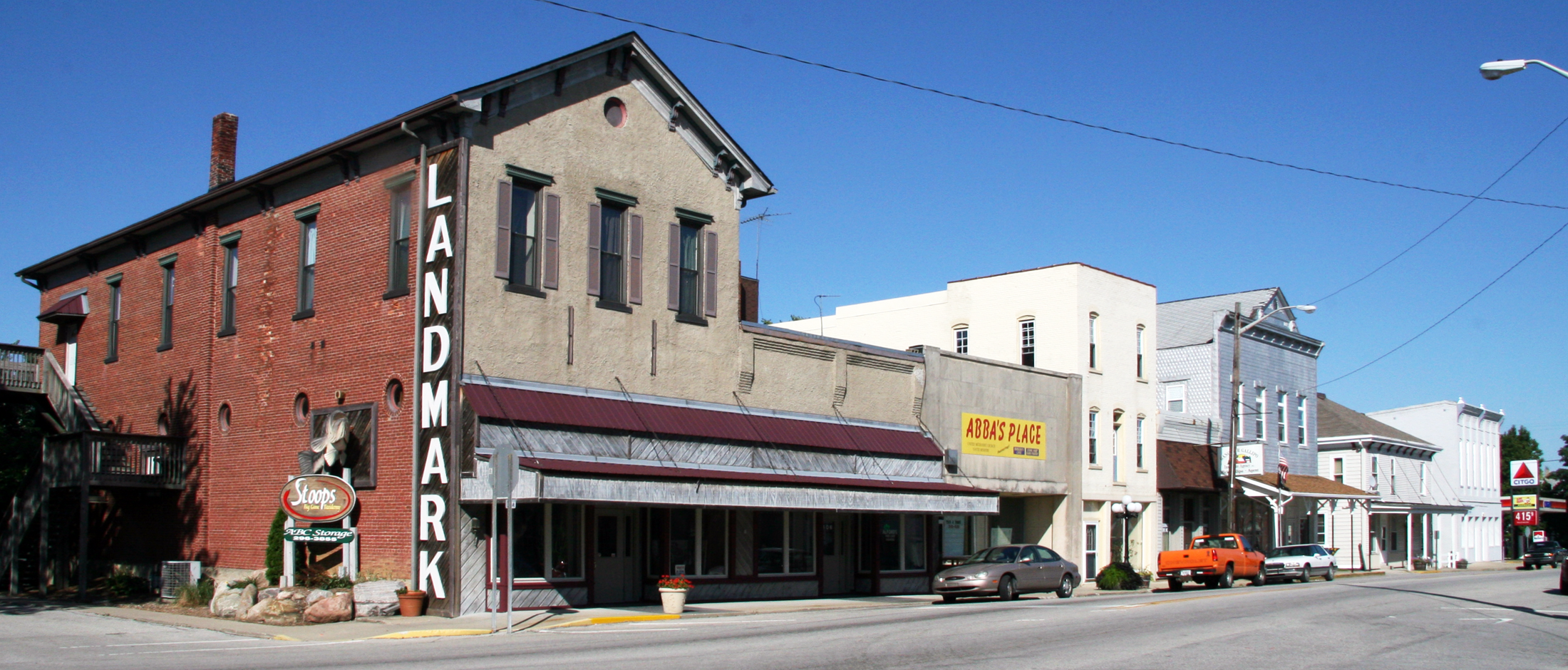
- Storefronts along Jackson Street in downtown Mulberry

- Logo

- Location of Mulberry in Clinton County, Indiana.
- Coordinates: 40°20′45″N 86°40′02″W
- Country: United States
- State: Indiana
- County: Clinton
- Township: Madison
- Founded: 1858

Area
  - Total: 0.53 sq mi (1.38 km^{2})
  - Land: 0.53 sq mi (1.38 km^{2})
  - Water: 0 sq mi (0.00 km^{2})
- Elevation: 781 ft (238 m)

Population (2020)
  - Total: 1,231
  - Density: 2,305.6/sq mi (890.19/km^{2})
- Time zone: UTC-5 (Eastern (EST))
  - Summer (DST): UTC-4 (EDT)
- ZIP code: 46058
- Area code: 765
- FIPS code: 18-51840
- GNIS feature ID: 2396793
- Website: www.townofmulberry.com

Mulberry is a town in Madison Township, Clinton County, Indiana, United States. The population was 1,231 at the 2020 census. The town was named for a mulberry tree which grew at the point where it was founded.

== History ==
The plat for the town of Mulberry was laid out by W. S. Perrin on October 1, 1858. In the dedication of the plat the town is mistakenly named Glicksburg, an error made by a surveyor. The town's first home was that of Thomas Waldron, who also operated the first store and was Mulberry's first postmaster. The Lafayette, Muncie and Bloomington Railroad (later the Lake Erie and Western, then New York Central) reached Mulberry around 1873; the Terre Haute, Indianapolis and Eastern interurban line also serviced the town in the early 1900s.

== Geography ==
According to the 2010 census, Mulberry has a total area of 0.59 square miles (1.53 km^{2}), all land.

== Demographics ==
Historical population
Census	Pop.	Note	%±
1880	229		—
1950	950		—
1960	1,062		11.8%
1970	1,075		1.2%
1980	1,225		14.0%
1990	1,262		3.0%
2000	1,387		9.9%
2010	1,254		−9.6%
2020	1,231		−1.8%
U.S. Decennial Census

=== 2020 census ===
As of the 2020 census, Mulberry had a population of 1,231. The median age was 42.4 years. 25.1% of residents were under the age of 18 and 26.3% of residents were 65 years of age or older. For every 100 females there were 85.4 males, and for every 100 females age 18 and over there were 81.9 males age 18 and over.

0.0% of residents lived in urban areas, while 100.0% lived in rural areas.

There were 447 households in Mulberry, of which 32.0% had children under the age of 18 living in them. Of all households, 47.4% were married-couple households, 19.9% were households with a male householder and no spouse or partner present, and 26.6% were households with a female householder and no spouse or partner present. About 33.1% of all households were made up of individuals and 17.9% had someone living alone who was 65 years of age or older.

There were 503 housing units, of which 11.1% were vacant. The homeowner vacancy rate was 0.3% and the rental vacancy rate was 12.7%.

Racial composition as of the 2020 census
Race	Number	Percent
White	1,144	92.9%
Black or African American	5	0.4%
American Indian and Alaska Native	0	0.0%
Asian	1	0.1%
Native Hawaiian and Other Pacific Islander	2	0.2%
Some other race	30	2.4%
Two or more races	49	4.0%
Hispanic or Latino (of any race)	51	4.1%

=== 2010 census ===
As of the census of 2010, there were 1,254 people, 466 households, and 301 families living in the town. The population density was 2,125.4 inhabitants per square mile (820.6/km^{2}). There were 516 housing units at an average density of 874.6 per square mile (337.7/km^{2}). The racial makeup of the town was 98.4% White, 0.2% African American, 0.4% Native American, 0.1% Pacific Islander, 0.1% from other races, and 0.9% from two or more races. Hispanic or Latino of any race were 1.0% of the population.

There were 466 households, of which 29.4% had children under the age of 18 living with them, 51.9% were married couples living together, 8.6% had a female householder with no husband present, 4.1% had a male householder with no wife present, and 35.4% were non-families. 30.7% of all households were made up of individuals, and 16.3% had someone living alone who was 65 years of age or older. The average household size was 2.41 and the average family size was 3.01.

The median age in the town was 44.9 years. 20.4% of residents were under the age of 18; 7.1% were between the ages of 18 and 24; 22.7% were from 25 to 44; 25.2% were from 45 to 64; and 24.6% were 65 years of age or older. The gender makeup of the town was 44.6% male and 55.4% female.

=== 2000 census ===
As of the census of 2000, there were 1,387 people, 497 households, and 334 families living in the town. The population density was 2,360.2 inhabitants per square mile (911.3/km^{2}). There were 508 housing units at an average density of 864.5 per square mile (333.8/km^{2}). The racial makeup of the town was 99.21% White, 0.07% African American, 0.07% Asian, 0.07% Pacific Islander, 0.07% from other races, and 0.50% from two or more races. Hispanic or Latino of any race were 0.58% of the population.

There were 497 households, out of which 31.8% had children under the age of 18 living with them, 57.3% were married couples living together, 6.8% had a female householder with no husband present, and 32.6% were non-families. 27.8% of all households were made up of individuals, and 16.1% had someone living alone who was 65 years of age or older. The average household size was 2.50 and the average family size was 3.07.

In the town, the population was spread out, with 23.8% under the age of 18, 7.3% from 18 to 24, 26.8% from 25 to 44, 18.0% from 45 to 64, and 24.2% who were 65 years of age or older. The median age was 40 years. For every 100 females, there were 85.2 males. For every 100 females age 18 and over, there were 79.5 males.

The median income for a household in the town was $45,000, and the median income for a family was $51,591. Males had a median income of $39,417 versus $24,559 for females. The per capita income for the town was $18,635. About 3.9% of families and 5.0% of the population were below the poverty line, including 4.0% of those under age 18 and 10.8% of those age 65 or over.

== Events ==
Mulberry holds a town festival, Mulberry Fest, annually on the fourth weekend (Friday-Sunday) in June.

== Notable people ==
- Robert D. Gaylor, Chief Master Sergeant of the Air Force
- V.M. Slipher and Earl C. Slipher, astronomers
