= List of mayors of Flagstaff, Arizona =

City of Flagstaff, Arizona mayors

The following is a list of mayors of the city of Flagstaff, Arizona, US.

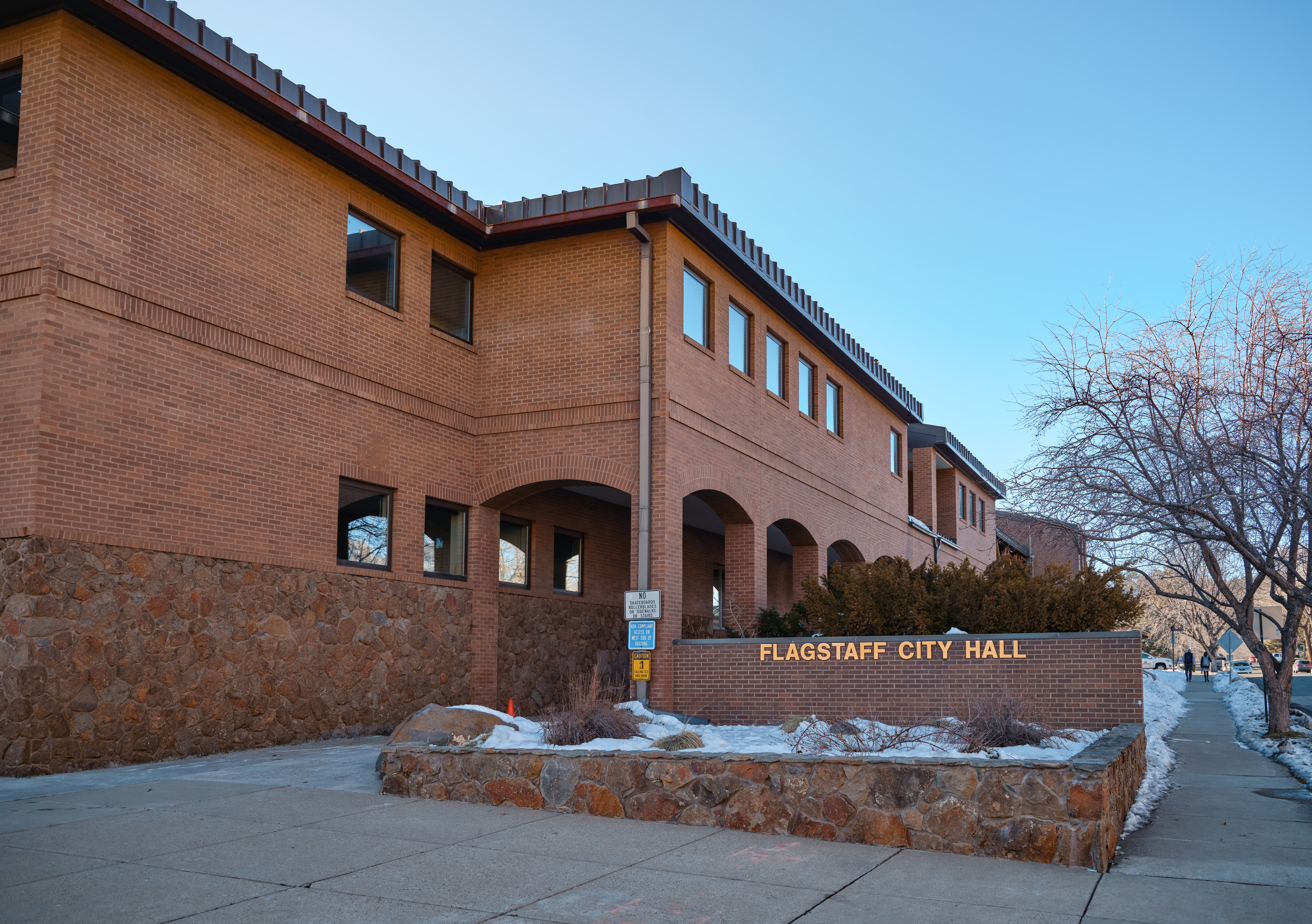
Flagstaff City Hall building in 2020

- Gorham A. Bray, c. 1894
- David Babbit, c. 1895
- J.W. Francis, c. 1896, 1914
- Julias Aubineau, c. 1898
- Tom Bunch, c. 1900
- E.E. Ellinwood, c. 1900
- Tom E. Pollock, Sr., c. 1901
- George Babbitt, c. 1904
- Leo F. Verkamp, c. 1906
- C.A. Keller, c. 1908
- R.F. Bonberg, c. 1910
- J.R. Treat, c. 1912
- C.B. Wilson, c. 1913
- O.H. John, c. 1916
- S.L. Finley, c. 1916
- Earl C. Slipher, c. 1918–20, 1923
- T.E. Pulliam, c. 1922, 1924
- Loren W. Cress, c. 1924
- I.B. Koch, c. 1926
- Dan L. Hogan, c. 1927–29
- M.J. Pilkington, c. 1930
- Dan Williams, c. 1932
- Robert F. Riordan, c. 1934
- T.A. Stahl, c. 1938
- Dave O. Saunders, c. 1938
- A.G. Pilcher, c. 1938
- Joseph J. Waldhaus, c. 1940
- George T. Herrington, c. 1942
- R.A. Bledsoe, c. 1944
- Harold L. Sykes, c. 1946–48
- H. L. Hutchinson, c. 1948–52
- Kenneth Switzer, c. 1952–54
- Edward T. Kerley, c. 1954–56
- Peter J. Lindemann, c. 1956–58
- Charles J. Saunders, c. 1958–60
- Rollin W. Wheeler, c. 1960
- Sylvan L. Harenberg, c. 1968
- William S. Erwin, c. 1974
- Dale Nations, c. 1975
- Joseph "Joe" C. Donaldson, c. 2000–05
- Sara Presler, c. 2008–12
- Jerry Nabours, c. 2012–14
- Coral Evans, c. 2017–20
- Paul Deasy, c. 2020-22
- Becky Daggett, c. 2023–present

== See also ==
- History of Flagstaff, Arizona
