= 1766 Slipher =

Main-belt asteroid

Discovery
- Discovered by: Indiana University (Indiana Asteroid Program)
- Discovery site: Goethe Link Obs.
- Discovery date: 7 September 1962

Designations
- Named after: Vesto Slipher and Earl C. Slipher
- Alternative designations: 1962 RF · 1953 UR; 1980 RH_{5}
- Minor planet category: main-belt · (middle); Padua

Orbital characteristics
- Epoch 4 September 2017 (JD 2458000.5)
- Uncertainty parameter 0
- Observation arc: 63.04 yr (23,027 days)
- Aphelion: 2.9919 AU
- Perihelion: 2.5066 AU
- Semi-major axis: 2.7493 AU
- Eccentricity: 0.0883
- Orbital period (sidereal): 4.56 yr (1,665 days)
- Mean anomaly: 23.827°
- Mean motion: 0° 12^{m} 58.32^{s} / day
- Inclination: 5.2283°
- Longitude of ascending node: 188.66°
- Argument of perihelion: 171.68°

Physical characteristics
- Dimensions: 14.37±3.73 km 14.74±5.05 km 18.959±0.211 km 19.099±0.218 km 20.21 km (calculated); 20.29±1.06 km
- Synodic rotation period: 7.677±0.0145 h (S); 7.693±0.0145 h (R)
- Geometric albedo: 0.044±0.003; 0.057 (assumed); 0.0583±0.0096; 0.09±0.10; 0.091±0.010; 0.11±0.13
- Spectral type: SMASS = C · X · C
- Absolute magnitude (H): 11.70 · 12.150±0.001 (R) · 12.20 · 12.3 · 12.46 · 12.75±0.14

1766 Slipher, provisional designation 1962 RF, is a Paduan asteroid from the central regions of the asteroid belt, approximately 18 kilometers in diameter. It was discovered on 7 September 1962, by astronomers of the Indiana Asteroid Program at Goethe Link Observatory in Indiana, United States. The asteroid was named after American astronomers Vesto Slipher and his brother Earl C. Slipher.

== Classification and orbit ==
Slipher is member of the mid-sized Padua family (507), an asteroid family named after 363 Padua and at least 25 million years old. It consists of mostly X-type asteroids, that were previously associated to 110 Lydia (the Padua family is therefore also known as Lydia family).

Slipher orbits the Sun in the central main-belt at a distance of 2.5–3.0 AU once every 4 years and 7 months (1,665 days). Its orbit has an eccentricity of 0.09 and an inclination of 5° with respect to the ecliptic.

The body's observation arc begins with its first identification as 1953 UR at the discovering Goethe Link observatory in October 1953, or 9 years prior to its official discovery observation.

== Physical characteristics ==
In the SMASS classification, Slipher is a carbonaceous C-type asteroid. PanSTARRS photometric survey characterized the asteroid as an X-type asteroid, which is in line with the overall spectral type of the Padua family.

=== Rotation period ===
In 2012, two rotational lightcurves of Slipher were obtained from photometric observations by astronomers at the Palomar Transient Factory in California. Lightcurve analysis gave a rotation period of 7.677 and 7.693 hours with a brightness variation of 0.20 and 0.19 magnitude in the S- and R-band, respectively (U=2/2).

=== Diameter and albedo ===
According to the surveys carried out by the Japanese Akari satellite and the NEOWISE mission of NASA's Wide-field Infrared Survey Explorer, Slipher measures between 14.37 and 20.29 kilometers in diameter and its surface has an albedo between 0.044 and 0.11.

The Collaborative Asteroid Lightcurve Link assumes a standard albedo for carbonaceous asteroids of 0.057 and calculates a diameter of 20.21 kilometers based on an absolute magnitude of 12.2.

== Naming ==
This minor planet was named after the brothers Vesto Slipher (1876–1969) and Earl C. Slipher (1883–1964), both graduates of Indiana University. Vesto Slipher was a pioneer investigator of the spectra of the planets, and was the first to measure the redshifts of galaxies, which was instrumental for Hubble's discovery of the expanding Universe. Earl Slipher developed and improved the direct photography of the planets. His photographs are the only continuous and systematic record of the appearance of the planets for a period of more than half a century.

The lunar and Martian Slipher craters were also named after the two brothers. The official naming citation was published by the Minor Planet Center on 20 February 1971 (M.P.C. 3144).
