= Amanda Bosh =

American astronomer

Amanda Bosh is an American planetary scientist and observational astronomer best known for her work on small Solar System objects. She is the former Executive Director of Lowell Observatory in Flagstaff, Arizona. Amanda served as the Executive Director from October 2024 until November 17, 2026. Bosh was also involved in co-founding Lowell Observatory’s Native American Outreach program.

== Education ==
In 1987, Bosh earned a bachelor degree from MIT where she double majored in Earth, atmospheric, and planetary sciences (EAPS) and materials science and engineering. She continued her education at MIT where she was advised by James L. Elliot, earning a PhD in EAPS in 1994. Bosh's PhD thesis was titled "Stellar Occultation Studies of Saturn's Rings with the Hubble Space Telescope" and she used stellar occultations to investigate the structure and dynamics of Saturn's rings. She constructed a geometric model for the ring-pole position and feature parameters (semi-major axis, eccentricity, longitude of periapse, precession rate or pattern speed, and azimuthal symmetry number). After earning a PhD, she became a postdoctoral fellow at Lowell Observatory.

== Career ==
Bosh is an observational astronomer who primarily studies small, icy objects in the outer Solar System. She has held positions in the Department of Physics at Hofstra University, Boston University, MIT, and Lowell Observatory. Bosh became a lecturer in EAPS at MIT in 2009 and was promoted in a senior lecturer in 2015. From 2020 to 2024, Bosh was the chief operating officer at Lowell Observatory. In November 2024, Bosh was appointed Executive Director of Lowell Observatory.

=== Research ===
Bosh has been heavily involved in observing stellar occultations of outer Solar System objects. Stellar occultations are an astronomical phenomena where a Solar System object passes in front of a background star, causing a dip in its brightness. Careful analysis of this change in brightness can reveal many features of the Solar System object, such as its atmospheric profile, ring structure, and diameter. Stellar occultations are often the most accurate way of measuring these features and can provide spatial resolutions of a few kilometers, which is several orders of magnitude better than other ground-based approaches. Thus, they were used to make several important discoveries, such as the discovery of Uranus's rings and the discovery of Pluto's atmosphere. Despite their utility, stellar occultations can be challenging to observe and require careful planning. Both the position of the star and planetary object must be known to high accuracy to determine whether or not an occultation will occur. Further, occultations can only be observed from specific locations on Earth, depending on where the shadow path is. Finally, occultations usually only last a few minutes, so observers must be in exactly the right place at the right time to see them.

Bosh was on the team of scientists that made the first direct measurement of Pluto's atmosphere and flew on the Kuiper Airborne Observatory (KAO). She was also part of the team that observed a stellar occultation of Pluto on the SOFIA aircraft in 2014, which occurred about two weeks before the New Horizons spacecraft's closest approach to Pluto. SOFIA, the Stratospheric Observatory for Infrared Astronomy is a Boeing 747SP aircraft which carries a 2.7 meter telescope. Astronomical observations are made when the aircraft is in flight, allowing astronomers a mobile observatory which can be brought anywhere in the world. Bosh and her colleagues were able to observe the occultation's central flash, which Bosh described as the "Holy Grail for occultation observers" because it probes the lowest levels of Pluto's atmosphere that are not otherwise observable. In order to observe the central flash, astronomers must be at the exact geometric center of the shadow path. Bosh played a critical role in determining where on Earth the geometric center would be, finding that it would be 227 kilometers north of the previous prediction. This allowed for changes to SOFIA's planned flight plan and put it in the center of the shadow path. Observations from SOFIA were in visible and infrared wavelengths and could be combined with nearly contemporary UV and radio wavelength observations from New Horizons. Combining these results allowed for very nearly complete temperature and pressure profiles of Pluto's atmosphere that spanned closer to Pluto's surface and farther up in the atmosphere than previously measured. Since Pluto's atmosphere was first discovered in 1988, it has been theorized that it would shrink and collapse as Pluto moved further away from the Sun. When the atmosphere was discovered, Pluto was near the perihelion of its highly eccentric, 250 year orbit. The measurements made by Bosh and her colleagues showed that Pluto's atmosphere had not collapsed and demonstrated that further investigation into its dynamics is required.

Bosh was also involved in the discovery of rings around the centaur Chiron in 2011, again using stellar occultations. No centaurs were not thought to possess rings, but Chiron is the second centaur with detected rings. Further observations in 2022, which Bosh contributed to, have revealed that the properties of the ring materiel have evolved between 2011 and 2022.

=== Teaching and outreach ===
Bosh taught three astronomy courses at MIT. She won MIT's Teaching with Digital Technology Award in 2020 for digital teaching excellence in extraordinary circumstances.

She co-founded the Lowell Observatory Native American Outreach Program in 1996. The goals of this program are to "use astronomy to help teachers get Native American children excited about astronomy and science in general, encouraging an interest in STEM careers". The program pairs astronomers with teachers to create an engaging STEM focused curriculum with hands-on activities.

== Personal life ==
Bosh is married to Stephen Levine, who is also an astronomer at Lowell Observatory.
