= Vesto Slipher =

American astronomer (1875–1969)

Vesto Melvin Slipher
- Born: November 11, 1875; Mulberry, Indiana, United States
- Died: November 8, 1969 (aged 93); Flagstaff, Arizona, United States
- Education: Indiana University Bloomington (BS, MS, PhD)
- Known for: Discovering redshifts in spiral galaxies; Discovering the sodium layer
- Spouse: Emma R. Munger (m. 1904)
- Children: 2
- Relatives: Earl C. Slipher (brother)
- Scientific career
- Fields: Astronomy
- Workplaces: Lowell Observatory

Vesto Melvin Slipher (/ˈslaɪfər/; November 11, 1875 – November 8, 1969) was an American astronomer who performed the first measurements of radial velocities for galaxies. He was the first to discover that distant galaxies are redshifted, thus providing the first empirical basis for the expansion of the universe. He was also the first to relate these redshifts to velocity.

== Early life and education ==
Vesto Melvin Slipher was born in Mulberry, Indiana, to Daniel Clark and Hannah App Slipher. He spent his early years working on his family farm in Mulberry. Vesto had a younger brother, Earl C. Slipher, who was also an astronomer at Lowell Observatory. Slipher went to high school in Frankfort, Indiana. He then attended Indiana University Bloomington and earned his bachelor's degree in Mechanics and Astronomy in June 1901. Two years later, Slipher earned his master's degree in the same program. At the age of 33, Vesto graduated with his Ph.D. in Mechanics and Astronomy from Indiana University.

== Career ==
While at school at Indiana University, Slipher formed a personal bond with one of his professors, William Cogshall. Cogshall was one of the main reasons Slipher became interested in astronomy in the first place. Cogshall convinced Percival Lowell, director of the Lowell Observatory in Flagstaff, Arizona, to take Vesto in as a temporary assistant. Slipher worked as an assistant from 1901 to 1915 when Lowell finally named him the assistant director of the observatory. One year later Percival Lowell died and Vesto became the acting director for the next ten years. In 1926, 25 years after arriving in Flagstaff, Slipher was named director of the Lowell Observatory. He remained in charge for 28 more years when he retired from professional life. Slipher spent his years there studying many things, but most notably, spectroscopy and redshifts of spiral nebulae.

The first major task Slipher was given was to measure the Solar System's planets' rotation interval. He was one of the first astronomers to show that Uranus has a much faster rotation than Earth, similar to the other giant planets in the Solar System. What Vesto is most known for though is his work with spiral nebulae, or, spiral galaxies, like the Milky Way and Andromeda. His initial goal was to measure how fast the nebulae were moving. His discoveries were confirmed ten years later when Edwin Hubble used the Mount Wilson Observatory reflector to view the galaxies much more clearly.

== Discoveries ==
Slipher, sixth from left, at the 1910 Fourth Conference International Union for Cooperation in Solar Research at Mount Wilson Observatory in California

Slipher introduced as early as 1909 that the infrared spectrum could be recorded using photographic emulsions, and used those to record the absorption lines of sunlight and major planets. He found that the planets showed different absorption lines that were not present in sunlight, and identified those bands with ammonia and methane. In the early twentieth century, Vesto Slipher elongated the spectrum to include the red and infrared wavelengths and showed that the major planets display strong absorption lines at many different wavelengths. Slipher used spectroscopy to investigate the rotation periods of planets and the composition of planetary atmospheres. In 1912, he was the first to observe the shift of spectral lines of galaxies, making him the discoverer of galactic redshifts. Using the Doppler effect and noting subtle changes, he measured the speeds in which spiral nebulae traveled during his research from 1912 and onward. These subtle changes in the speeds of the nebulae led Slipher to conclude that the nebulae were not within the Milky Way galaxy. In 1914, Slipher also made the first discovery of the rotation of spiral galaxies. He discovered the sodium layer in 1929. He was responsible for hiring Clyde Tombaugh and supervised the work that led to the discovery of Pluto in 1930.

By 1917, Slipher had measured the radial velocities of 25 "spiral nebulae", and found that all but three of those galaxies were moving away from us, at substantial speeds. Slipher himself speculated that this might be due to the motion of our own galaxy – as in his sample, those galaxies moving towards us and those moving away from us were roughly in opposite directions. In hindsight, this was the first data supporting models of an expanding universe. Later, Slipher's and additional spectroscopic measurements of radial velocities were combined by Edwin Hubble with Hubble's own determinations of galaxy distances, leading Hubble to discover the (at that time, rough) proportionality between galaxies' distances and redshifts, which is today termed the Hubble–Lemaître law (formerly named Hubble's law; the IAU Decision of October 2018 recommends the use of a new name), was formulated by Hubble and Humason in 1929 and became the basis for the modern model of the expanding universe.

== Personal life ==
Slipher married Emma R. Munger in 1904 in Frankfort, Indiana. Vesto and Emma had two children – David Clark and Marcia Frances.

In 1901 Slipher moved to Flagstaff, Arizona, and began work at Lowell Observatory. He continued at Lowell as an assistant and as the director until his retirement in 1954. Slipher died in Flagstaff in 1969 at age 93. He is buried at Citizens Cemetery in Flagstaff.

== Awards ==
- Member of the American Academy of Arts and Sciences (elected 1909)
- Lalande Prize (1919)
- Gold Medal of the Paris Academy of Sciences (1919)
- Member of the United States National Academy of Sciences (1921)
- Member of the American Philosophical Society (1921)
- Henry Draper Medal of the National Academy of Sciences (1932)
- Gold Medal of the Royal Astronomical Society (1932)
- Bruce Medal (1935)
- The crater Slipher on the Moon is named after Earl and Vesto Slipher, as is the crater Slipher on Mars and the asteroid 1766 Slipher, discovered September 7, 1962, by the Indiana Asteroid Program.
