= Happy Jack, Arizona =

Unincorporated community in Coconino County, Arizona, US

- Unincorporated community
- Location within Arizona Location within the United States
- Coordinates: 34°44′36″N 111°24′27″W
- Country: United States
- State: Arizona
- County: Coconino
- Elevation: 7,493 ft (2,284 m)
- Time zone: UTC-7 (Mountain (MST))
- ZIP code: 86024
- GNIS feature ID: 29736

Happy Jack is an unincorporated community and campground located in the Mogollon Rim Region of Coconino County, Arizona, United States. The Lowell Discovery Telescope is located there. It is located on Lake Mary Road southeast of Flagstaff, Arizona.

== History ==
Happy Jack was founded in 1947 as a logging camp. The community also contained a ranger station and post office. By 1948, 300 people lived in the town, and at its peak, housed around 500 people. The town was built by the Saginaw and Manistee Lumber company.

The community petitioned for a school in 1970.

The first logging camp closed approximately 30 years after it opened. The logging company requested Happy Jack be moved 13 miles, closer to Clints Well, starting around 1974. The Happy Jack post office moved 15 miles down the road to a place known locally as Long Valley in 1983 and is also known as Happy Jack Too. However, Long Valley does not appear on any maps.

== Etymology ==
The town was founded at a place called Onion Flat, and was originally called "Yellowjacket." However, three other Yellowjacket place names already existed, so a new name had to be chosen for the new community.

Happy Jack may have been named for a cheerful local lumberman. However, another newspaper report says the Coconino National Forest Supervisor Ronald Rotty named Happy Jack, after an area of Wyoming where a bandit named Happy Jack committed crimes.

== Climate ==
According to the Köppen Climate Classification system, Happy Jack has a Continental climate, abbreviated "Dsb" on climate maps.

Climate data for Happy Jack, Arizona (1991–2020 normals, extremes 1969–present)
Month	Jan	Feb	Mar	Apr	May	Jun	Jul	Aug	Sep	Oct	Nov	Dec	Year
Record high °F (°C)	65 (18)	76 (24)	72 (22)	76 (24)	87 (31)	97 (36)	94 (34)	92 (33)	88 (31)	80 (27)	71 (22)	70 (21)	97 (36)
Mean maximum °F (°C)	54.3 (12.4)	56.9 (13.8)	62.2 (16.8)	69.3 (20.7)	77.3 (25.2)	86.3 (30.2)	87.7 (30.9)	84.6 (29.2)	79.8 (26.6)	72.7 (22.6)	64.8 (18.2)	56.3 (13.5)	88.8 (31.6)
Mean daily maximum °F (°C)	40.4 (4.7)	42.2 (5.7)	48.7 (9.3)	55.6 (13.1)	64.9 (18.3)	75.2 (24.0)	78.3 (25.7)	75.4 (24.1)	70.5 (21.4)	60.6 (15.9)	49.7 (9.8)	40.7 (4.8)	58.5 (14.7)
Daily mean °F (°C)	29.7 (−1.3)	31.3 (−0.4)	36.8 (2.7)	42.5 (5.8)	50.3 (10.2)	59.3 (15.2)	64.9 (18.3)	63.2 (17.3)	57.1 (13.9)	47.2 (8.4)	37.4 (3.0)	29.8 (−1.2)	45.8 (7.7)
Mean daily minimum °F (°C)	18.9 (−7.3)	20.4 (−6.4)	24.9 (−3.9)	29.4 (−1.4)	35.8 (2.1)	43.4 (6.3)	51.4 (10.8)	51.0 (10.6)	43.8 (6.6)	33.9 (1.1)	25.1 (−3.8)	18.8 (−7.3)	33.1 (0.6)
Mean minimum °F (°C)	−0.8 (−18.2)	3.7 (−15.7)	8.1 (−13.3)	17.3 (−8.2)	23.5 (−4.7)	30.8 (−0.7)	41.0 (5.0)	41.8 (5.4)	32.0 (0.0)	20.0 (−6.7)	8.8 (−12.9)	−0.1 (−17.8)	−5.1 (−20.6)
Record low °F (°C)	−35 (−37)	−16 (−27)	−12 (−24)	−2 (−19)	12 (−11)	22 (−6)	31 (−1)	30 (−1)	23 (−5)	0 (−18)	−5 (−21)	−27 (−33)	−35 (−37)
Average precipitation inches (mm)	2.97 (75)	2.93 (74)	2.53 (64)	1.00 (25)	0.81 (21)	0.34 (8.6)	2.55 (65)	3.15 (80)	1.99 (51)	1.48 (38)	1.70 (43)	2.60 (66)	24.05 (611)
Average snowfall inches (cm)	13.8 (35)	20.6 (52)	8.1 (21)	5.2 (13)	0.9 (2.3)	0.0 (0.0)	0.0 (0.0)	0.0 (0.0)	0.0 (0.0)	1.0 (2.5)	5.8 (15)	14.3 (36)	69.7 (176.8)
Average precipitation days (≥ 0.01 inch)	4.0	4.1	4.5	2.3	3.2	1.6	9.9	11.5	5.5	4.0	2.7	4.3	57.6
Average snowy days (≥ 0.1 inch)	2.8	3.3	2.3	1.2	0.3	0.0	0.0	0.0	0.0	0.5	1.1	3.9	15.4
Source: National Oceanic and Atmospheric Administration
