= Slipher (lunar crater) =

Crater on the Moon

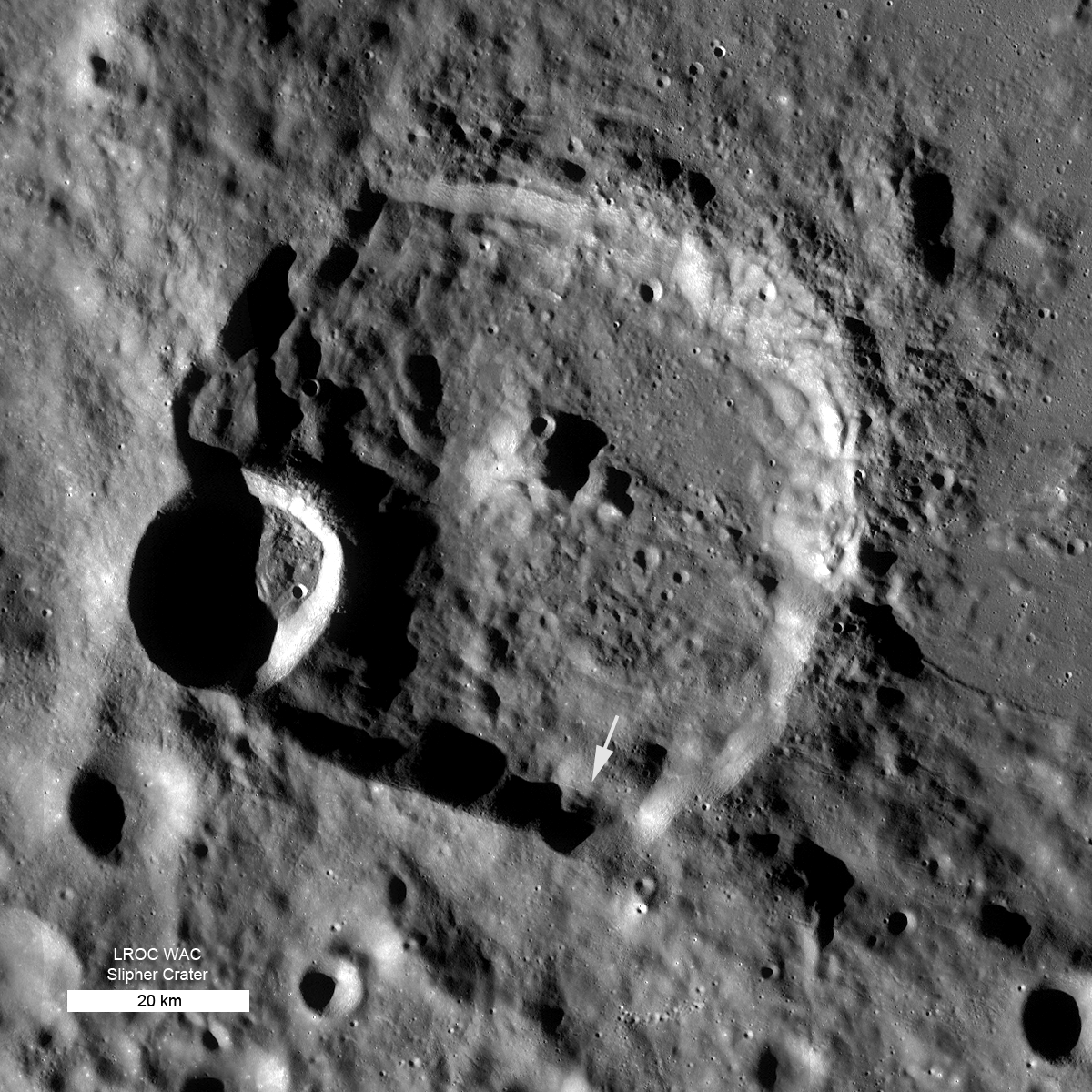
- LRO image. Arrow indicates the location of the scarp pictured below.
- Coordinates: 49.28°N 160.27°E
- Diameter: 74.65 km (46.39 mi)
- Depth: Unknown
- Colongitude: 200° at sunrise
- Eponym: Earl Slipher; Vesto Slipher

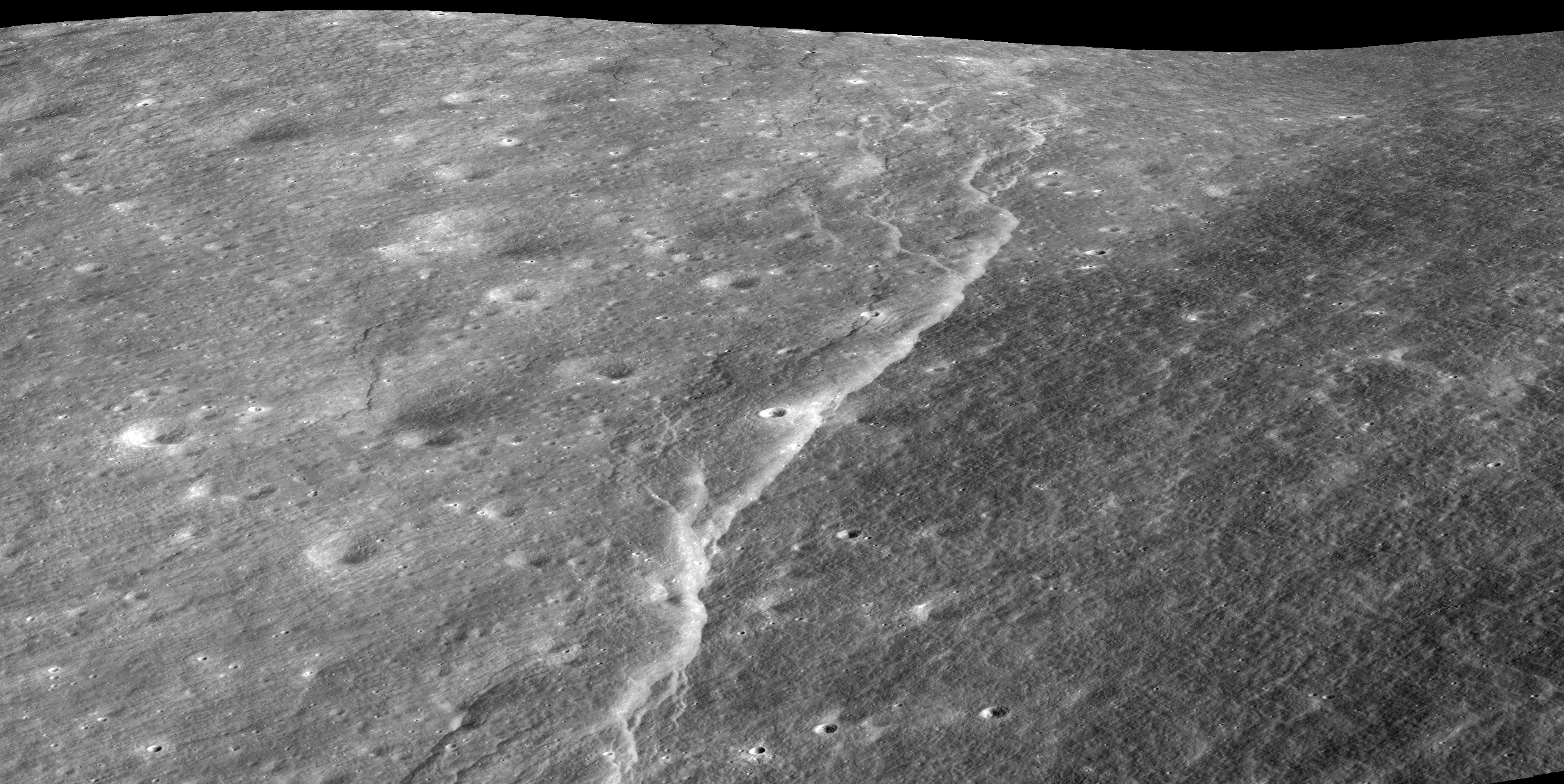
Lobate scarp near the south wall of Slipher.

Slipher is a lunar impact crater, that is located in the northern latitudes on the far side of the Moon. The crater overlies the southwestern outer rim of the much larger walled plain D'Alembert, and it occupies a portion of the interior floor of D'Alembert. To the south-southeast is the crater Langevin.

This formation dates to the Late Imbrian epoch of the lunar geologic timescale. Because it overlies D'Alembert, Slipher is a younger formation and it has undergone much less erosion. The rim is circular but has a somewhat irregular edge. The rim is jumbled and irregular where it intersects D'Alembert. Overlapping the western rim and inner walls of Slipher is the smaller Slipher S, a fresh feature with a sharp-edged outer rim. The infrared spectrum of pure crystalline plagioclase has been identified on the east wall. The interior floor of Slipher is somewhat uneven except in the northeast, and there is a cluster of low central ridges near the midpoint.

A distinct lobate scarp, located near the south wall of the crater, was imaged by Lunar Reconnaissance Orbiter. The scarp is a result of the cooling of the moon and resulting compression of the surface.

The crater was formally named by the IAU in 1970 after American astronomers Earl Slipher and Vesto Slipher.

== Satellite craters ==
By convention these features are identified on lunar maps by placing the letter on the side of the crater midpoint that is closest to Slipher.

Slipher	Latitude	Longitude	Diameter
S	49.2° N	158.7° E	26 km

== See also ==
- 1766 Slipher, main-belt asteroid
