= Earl C. Slipher =

American astronomer and politician (1883–1964)

Member of the Arizona Senate from the Coconino County district
- In office January 1933 – December 1934
- Preceded by: George Truman
- Succeeded by: Clyde Stauffer
- In office January 1929 – December 1930
- Preceded by: A. T. Kilcrease
- Succeeded by: George Truman

Member of the Arizona House of Representatives from the Coconino County district
- In office January 1927 – December 1928

Personal details
- Born: March 25, 1883 Mulberry, Indiana
- Died: August 7, 1964 (aged 81)
- Party: Democratic
- Profession: Politician

Earl Carl Slipher (/ˈslaɪfər/; March 25, 1883 – August 7, 1964) was an American astronomer and politician. He was the brother of astronomer Vesto Slipher. He served in both the Arizona House of Representatives and the Arizona State Senate.

== Biography ==
Slipher was born in Mulberry, Indiana. He first joined Lowell Observatory in 1908 and became a noted planetary astronomer, concentrating on Mars. He published Photographic History of Mars (1905–1961). In 1957, he appeared in the "Mars and Beyond" episode of Disneyland discussing the possibility of life on Mars.

He also served as mayor of Flagstaff, Arizona from 1918 to 1920, and later as a member of the Arizona state legislature until 1933.

The crater Slipher on the Moon is named after Earl and Vesto Slipher, as is asteroid 1766 Slipher, discovered September 7, 1962, by the Indiana Asteroid Program.

He served a two terms in the Arizona State Senate during the 8th and 10th Arizona State Legislatures, holding the seat from Coconino County. He was also a member of the Arizona House of Representatives, from Coconino County, during the 7th Arizona State Legislature.

== See also ==
- List of mayors of Flagstaff, Arizona
