= Slipher (Martian crater) =

Slipher Crater
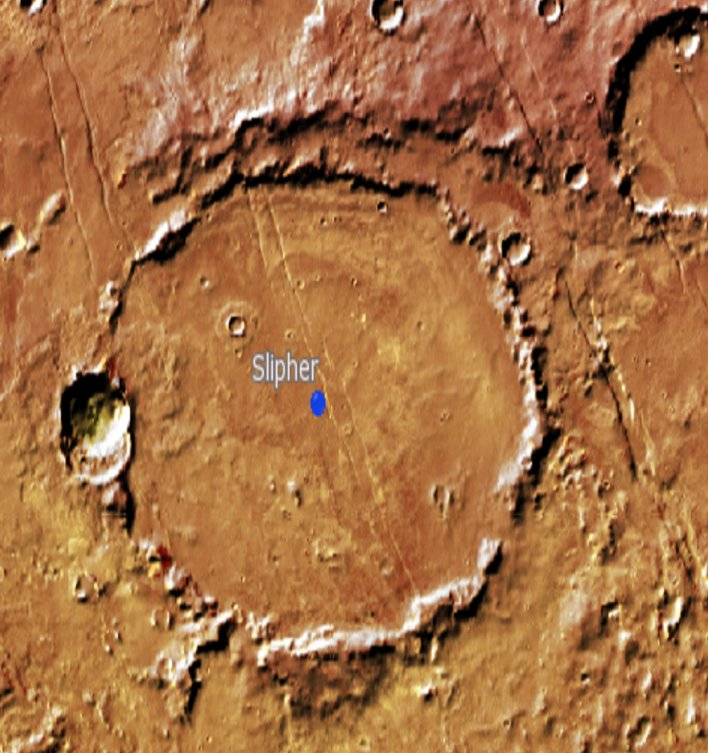
- Topographic location map of Slipher Crater.
- Planet: Mars
- Coordinates: 47.3°S 84.6°W
- Quadrangle: Thaumasia
- Diameter: 127 km (79 mi)
- Eponym: Vesto and Earl Slipher

Slipher is an impact crater in the Thaumasia quadrangle of Mars, located at 47.3°S latitude and 84.6°W longitude. It measures 127 kilometres (79 mi) in diameter and was named after American astronomers Vesto and Earl Slipher. The naming was approved by IAU's Working Group for Planetary System Nomenclature in 1973.

== Description ==
Gullies are visible on the walls of a crater that is on the rim of Slipher. They can be seen in the pictures below. Martian gullies are small, incised networks of narrow channels and their associated downslope sediment deposits, found on the planet of Mars. They are named for their resemblance to terrestrial gullies. First discovered on images from Mars Global Surveyor, they occur on steep slopes, especially on the walls of craters. Usually, each gully has a dendritic alcove at its head, a fan-shaped apron at its base, and a single thread of incised channel linking the two, giving the whole gully an hourglass shape. They are believed to be relatively young because they have few, if any craters. A subclass of gullies is also found cut into the faces of sand dunes which themselves considered to be quite young.

On the basis of their form, aspects, positions, and location amongst and apparent interaction with features thought to be rich in water ice, many researchers believed that the processes carving the gullies involve liquid water. However, this remains a topic of active research.

As soon as gullies were discovered, researchers began to image many gullies over and over, looking for possible changes. By 2006, some changes were found. Later, with further analysis it was determined that the changes could have occurred by dry granular flows rather than being driven by flowing water. With continued observations many more changes were found in Gasa Crater and others.

With more repeated observations, more and more changes have been found; since the changes occur in the winter and spring, experts are tending to believe that gullies were formed from dry ice. Before-and-after images demonstrated the timing of this activity coincided with seasonal carbon-dioxide frost and temperatures that would not have allowed for liquid water. When dry ice frost changes to a gas, it may lubricate dry material to flow especially on steep slopes. In some years frost, perhaps as thick as 1 meter.

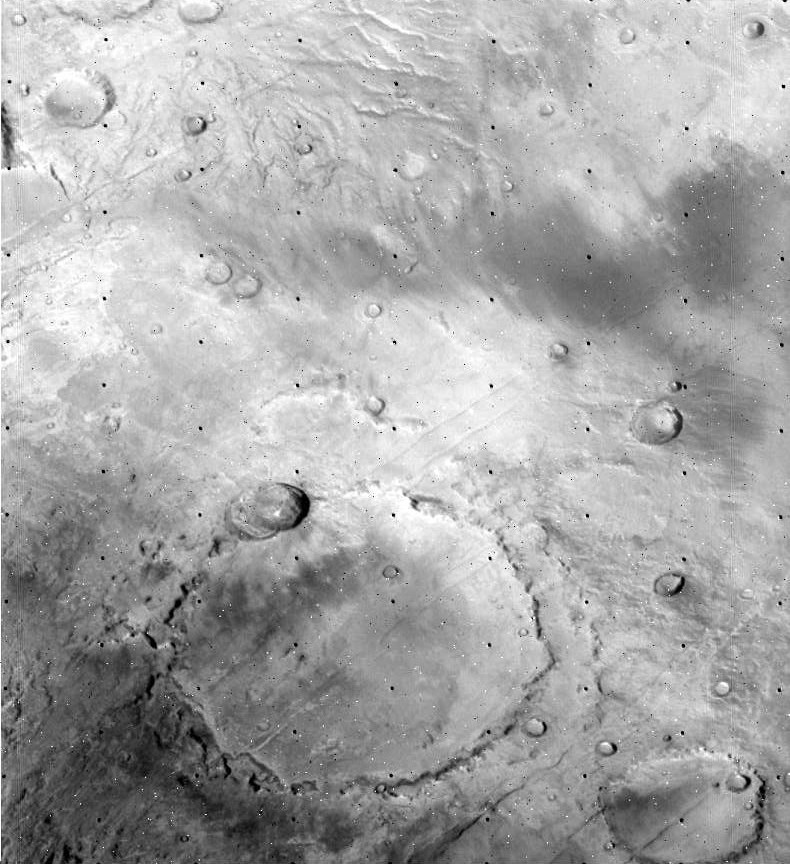
Viking Orbiter 1 image with Slipher crater at bottom

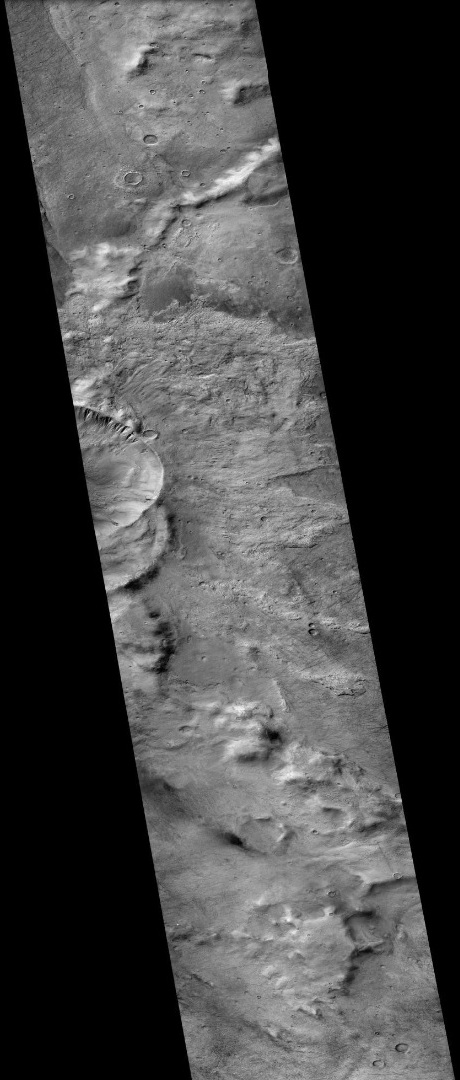
Slipher crater on Mars, as seen by MRO's CTX camera

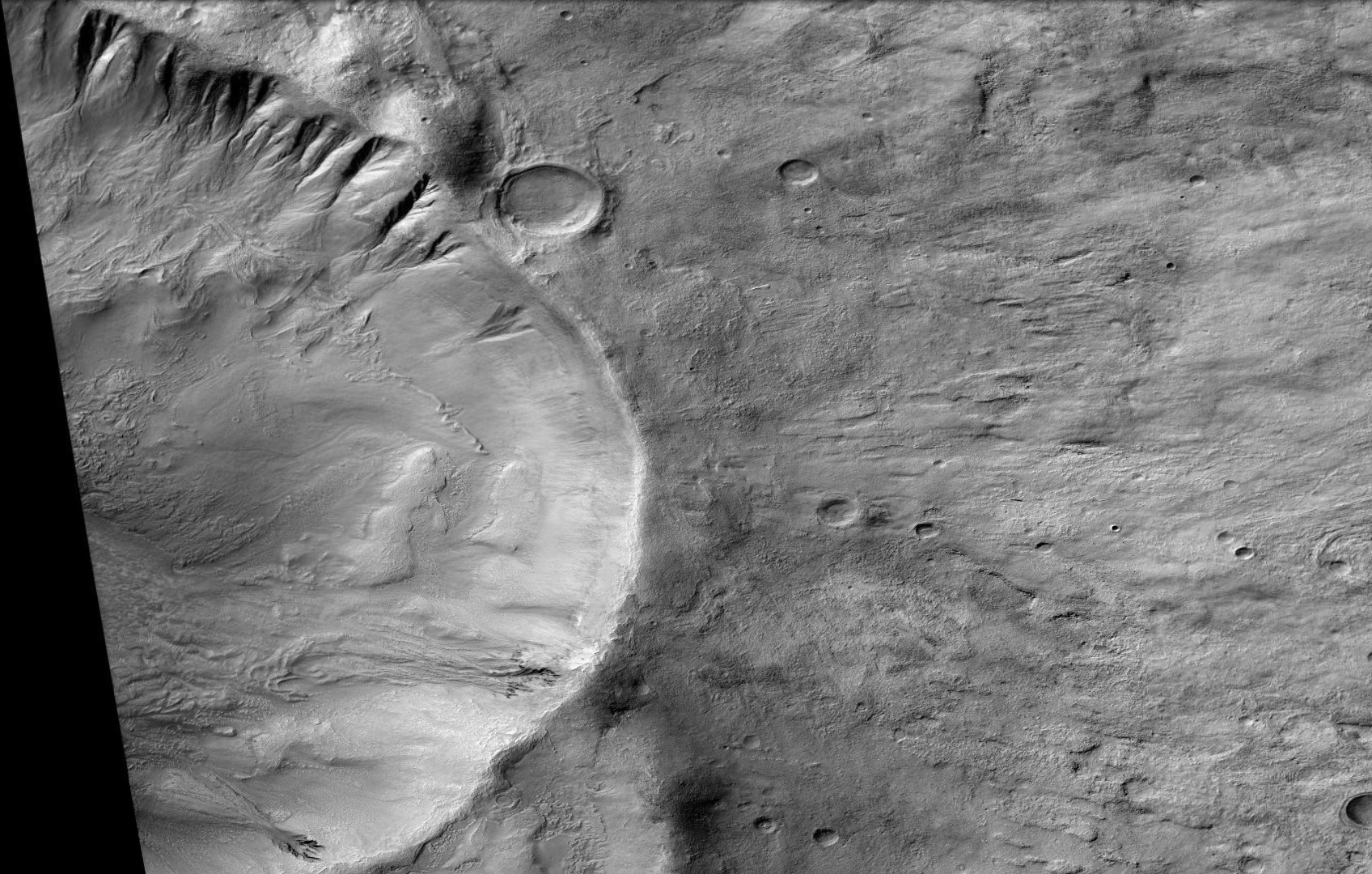
Gullies in crater on the rim of Slipher. This is an enlargement of the previous image.

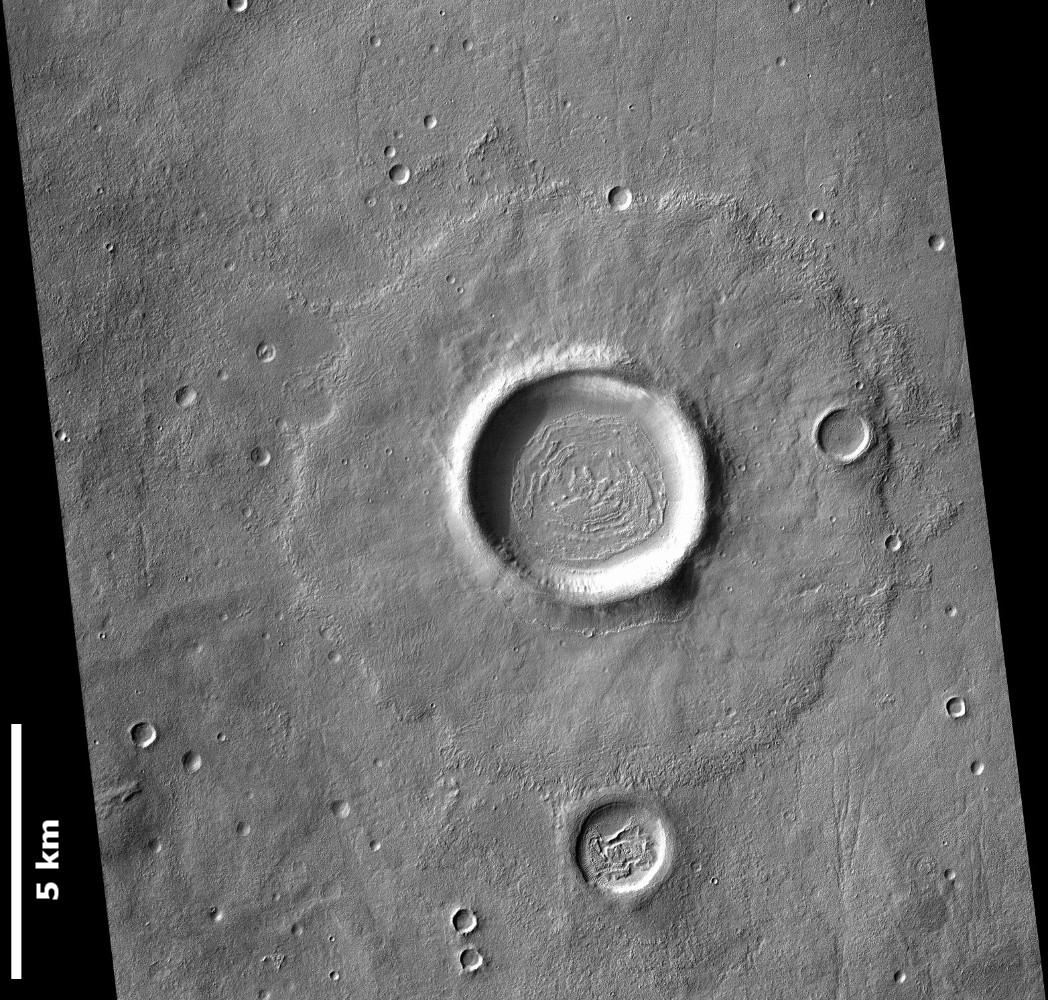
The small pedestal crater in the northwestern floor of Slipher

== See also ==
- List of craters on Mars
