= House of Spoelberch =

Belgian noble family

Spoelberch coat of arms

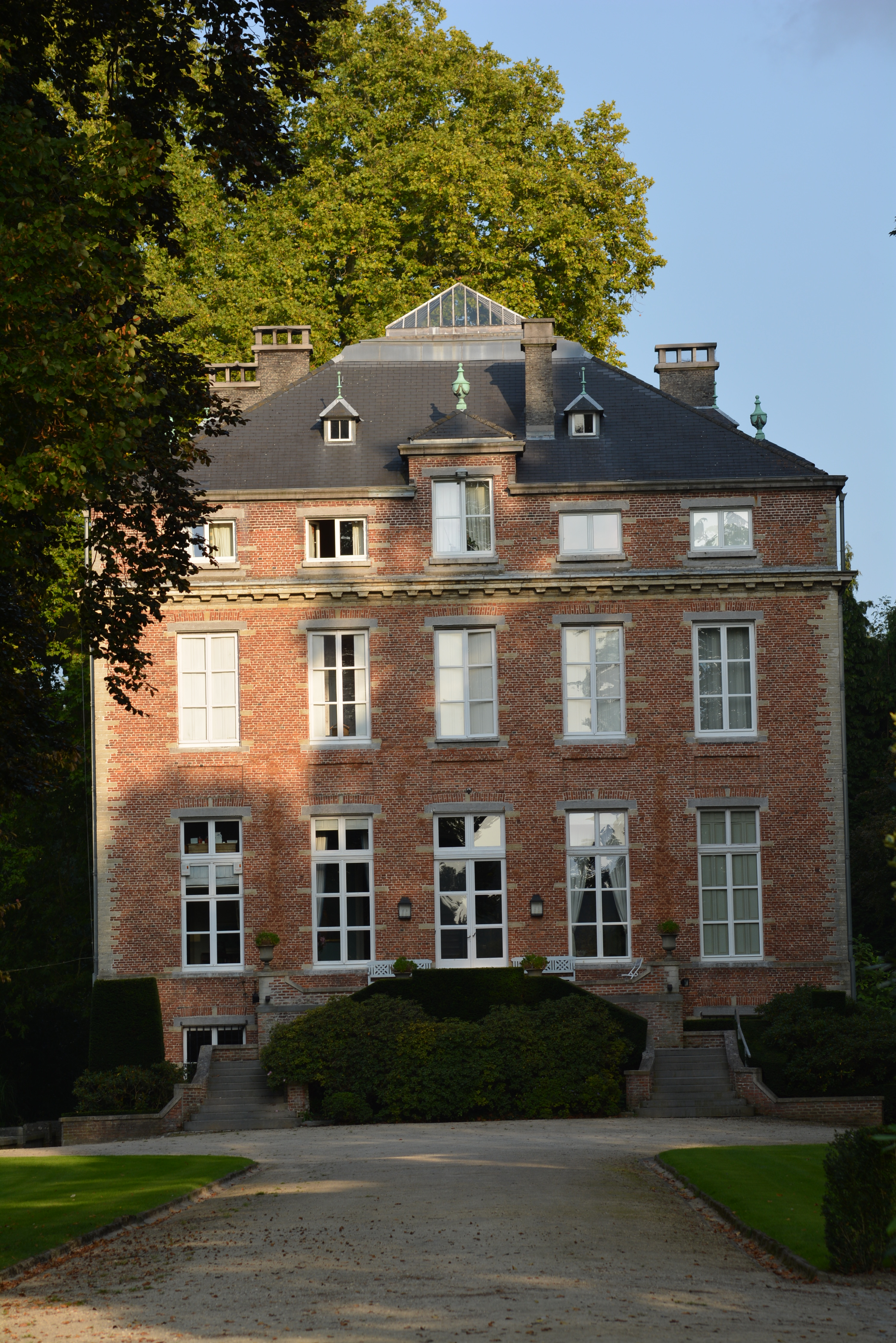
Drie Torens Castle

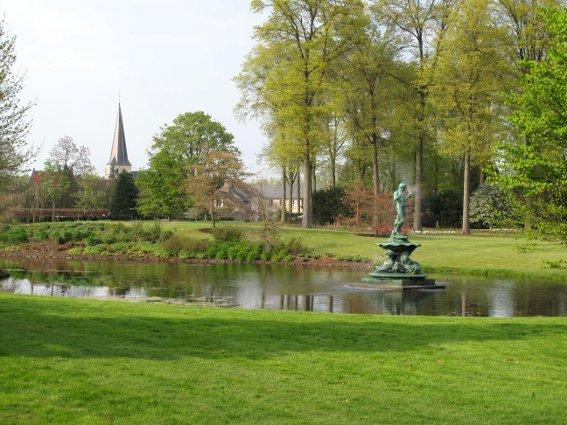
Arboretum Wespelaar, important dendrological collection of Philippe de Spoelberch.

The House of Spoelberch is a distinguished Belgian noble house. The family was also part of the Nobility of the Holy Roman Empire and today it is legally recognized as being part of the Belgian nobility.

== History ==
The genealogy of this family can be traced back to an act of 19 April 1535, though they claim to have had the status of nobility since the late 14th century. This act mentions Willem Spoelberchs as the husband of Catherina van Hoegaerde, and as being the son of Wouter Spoelberchs.

In 1828 Jean-Charles-Laurent-Joseph de Spoelberch de la Bawette inherited the Kasteel Drie Torens (Three Towers Castle) in Londerzeel. Another castle obtained by marriage is in Wespelaar.

Members of the family bear the title of Viscount de Spoelberch. Today this noble house is one of the wealthiest families of the kingdom; their private fortune is an estimated €14 billion.

André de Spoelberch, who died in 2017, was among the twenty wealthiest Belgians until his death. Part of that wealth was due to his stake in the global beer brewing company AB InBev.

== Members ==
=== Descendants from Generation IX ===
1. Walter van Spoelberch, knight, died in Brussels 1581: married 1565 Catherine of Hardumont.
  1. Jan Baptiste van Spoelberch, (1566-1627): Page of Peter Ernst I von Mansfeld-Vorderort, knight of the Holy Empire by Ferdinand II. Married 1594 to Maria Magdalena Garet.
    1. Henri of Spoelberch, (1595-1595)
    2. Ferdinand van Spoelberch (1596-1675), Knight of the Order of Christ, Lord of Lovenjoel. Accompanied Ferdinand van Boisschot on a diplomatic mission to France; fought in the defence of Leuven. Married Anna de Grimaldi of Morazane.
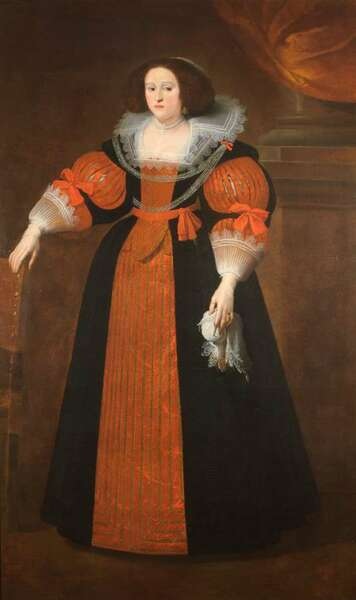
      Portrait of Anna de Grimaldi de Morosana, spouse of Ferdinand van Spoelberch, by Gaspar de Crayer, collection of KU Leuven
      1. Anna Maria van Spoelberch, (1627-1627).
      2. Maria Magdalena vn Spoelberch, (1628-1635).
      3. Karel Frans II van Spoelberch, (1630-1692): Lord of Lovenjoul, Alderman of Brussels. Died without heirs.
      4. Christoffel van Spoelberch (1633-1707) Lord of Lovenjoul, Mayor of Leuven. Married Joanna Catherine Bex de Balven.
        1. Anna Ida of Spoelberch, (1673-1674).
        2. Charles III Adolphe of Spoelberch, (1674-1705).
        3. François II Lambert de Spoelberch, (1675-1677)
        4. François III Philippe Benoit de Spoelberch, (1676-1751), Lord of Lovenjoul, Mayor of Leuven. Married 1st Suzanne, lady de Dielbeke, 2nd Joanna Isabella le Comte d'Orville, daughter of John Peter, Mayor of Brussels.
          1. Charles Christian de Spoelberch (1709-1772), Knight of the Order of Christ, Lord of Lovenjoul. Married Theresia de la Bawette.
            1. Melchior Joseph Xaver, Viscount de Spoelberch, (1742-1762), Knight of the Order of Christ: died in the Battle of Freyberg.
            2. John Charles Laurens, Viscount de Spoelberch, (1750-1838): Lord Chamberlain of the King of Holland. Married Henriette Marie d'Olmen.
              1. Auguste François Ghislain Jerome, Viscount de Spoelberch, died 1807.
              2. Jules Jean Baptiste François, Viscount de Spoelberch
              3. John Baptiste III, Viscount de Spoelberch, Knight of Malta: see further.
              4. Alexandre Charles Ghislain, Viscount de Spoelberch, Knight of Malta, died in battle.
              5. Henriette Huberte Ghislain, Viscountess de Spoelberch: married François Constantin, Viscount de Putte.
                1. Alphonse Hyacinthe Henri, Viscount de Putte: born 1810.
          2. Andrew Emmanuel Joseph, Viscount de Spoelberch: married 1st Petronelle Nagelameckers, 2nd Marie Angelica de Bayol: From his 1st marriage were born 11 children, from his second six children.
            1. Alexandre Joseph François, Viscount de Spoelberch: died 1763: Member of the Holy Roman Rota.
    3. John Baptist II of Spoelberch, (1598-1602).
    4. Charles I of Spoelberch, (1600-1620)
    5. Francois I of Spoelberch, (1602-1643)
    6. Mary Joanna of Spoelberch, (1606-1661)
  2. William of Spoelberch, (1569-1633): Friar in Mechelen.
  3. Jeremias of Spoelberch, (1571-1572)
  4. Gaspard of Spoelberch (1573-1584)
  5. Peter of Spoelberch (1576-): took vows in Park Abbey.
  6. Joanne of Spoelberch, died 1637: Mother Superior of Visitandines in Nivelles.

=== Descendants of Jean-Baptiste-Louis-Charles ===
John Baptiste III Louis Charles, Viscount de Spoelberch,
married to Henrietta Countess de Brouchoven de Bergeyck.

  1. Adolphe, Viscount de Spoelberch, (1839-1913)
    married to Elisabeth Willems (1855-1941).
    1. Guilliam, Viscount de Spoelberch, (1874-1947), Lord Mayor of Wespelaar
      married to Colienne de Neufforge (1882-1929).
      1. Werner, Viscount de Spoelberch, (1902-1987)
        married to barones Elinor de Haas Teichen (1916-1976).
        1. Philippe, Viscount de Spoelberch, (1941-): Marr. Diane, viscountess de Jonghe d'Ardoye (1943).
          1. Thomas Nicolas Fernand Werner de Spoelberch, (1964-)
      2. Éric Antoine Ghislain Joseph, Viscount de Spoelberch, (1903-1939): Died in World War II.
        married to Katharina Stewart.
        1. Guillaume, Viscount de Spoelberch
        2. Jacques, Viscount de Spoelberch
    2. Roger, Viscount de Spoelberch, (1875-1950): Mayor of Londerzeel,
      married to Elisabeth, Countess de Jonghe d'Ardoye (1895-1978)
      1. André, Viscount de Spoelberch (1925-2017), x Claude, Countess de Clermont-Tonnerre (1937).
        1. Daïné, Viscountesse de Spoelberch (1972), x Henri, Prince of Arenberg (1961).
    3. Antoinette, Viscountesse de Spoelberch, (1880-1943):
      married to Louis, Count de Baillet Latour, (1878-1953).
      1. Alfred, Count de Baillet Latour, (1901–1980).
