= Crazy Horse (cabaret) =

Cabaret in Paris

Crazy Horse Paris
- Le Crazy Horse de Paris
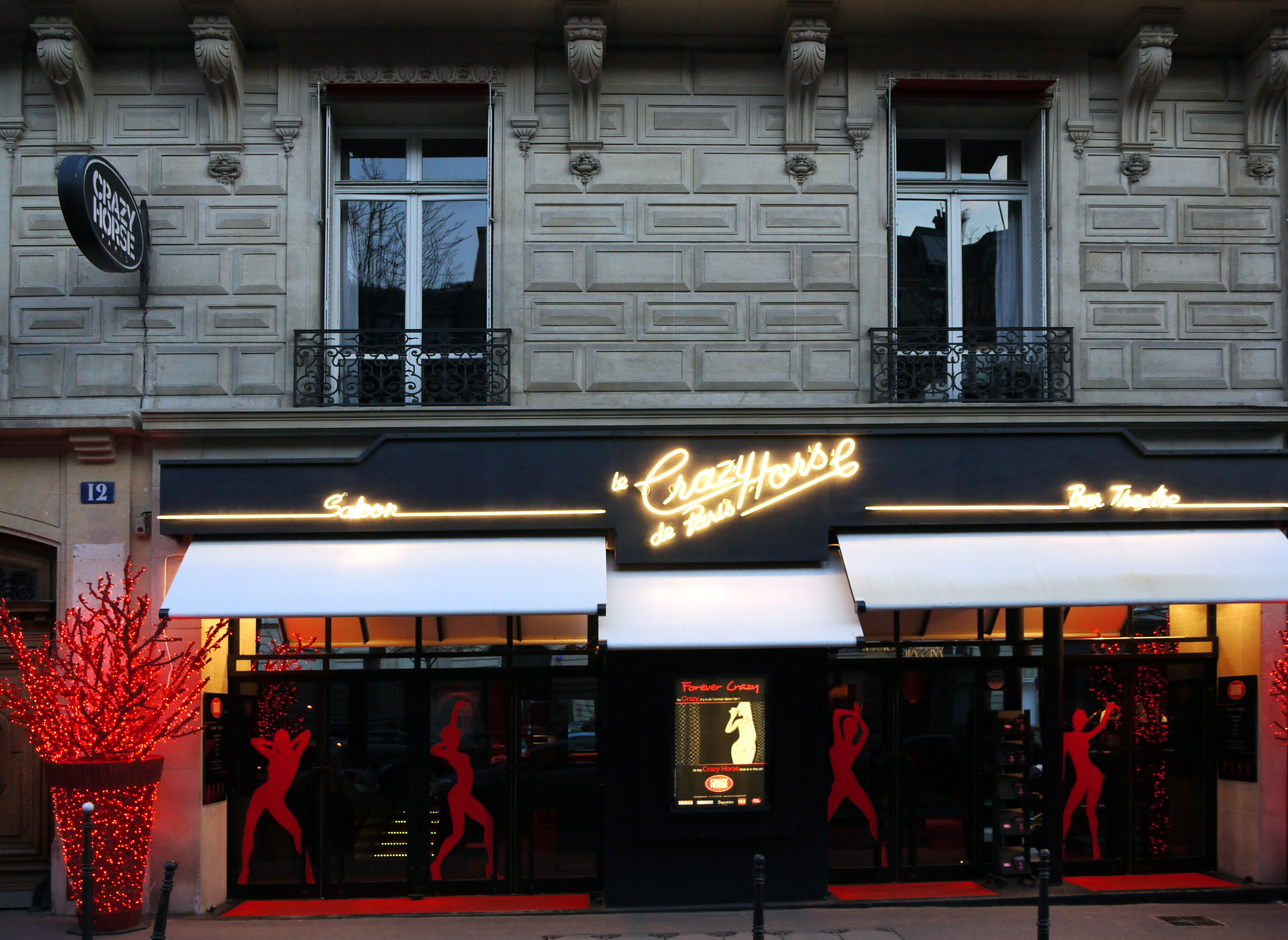
- Street view of the club in November 2008
- Interactive map of Crazy Horse Paris
- Address: 12 Avenue George-V
- Location: Paris, France
- Coordinates: 48°51′57″N 02°18′06″E
- Type: Cabaret

Construction
- Opened: 1951

Website
- lecrazyhorseparis.com

Crazy Horse Paris (formerly Crazy Horse Saloon) is a Parisian cabaret, established in 1951, known for its highly aesthetic and refined stage shows performed by a cast of female dancers, dressed mainly in kaleidoscopic plays of light and projections. The cabaret has performed around the world on tour. A second permanent show has opened its doors in Palm Jumeirah, Dubai, in November 2026. Formerly Crazy Horse Paris has opened a cabaret in Las Vegas (2001 to 2012) and in Singapore. Other unrelated strip-club, bars and businesses have used the name "Crazy Horse" in their names.

== History ==
Crazy Horse Paris original cabaret occupies former wine cellars (12 in all, which have been combined) of an impressive Haussmanian building at 12 Avenue George-V (from the British king George V, in French "George Cinq").

Alain Bernardin opened it in 1951 and personally operated it for decades until his death in 1994. Paul de Cordon took hundreds of photos at the cabaret. Many of the original waiters (their names stitched in large letters onto the backs of their waistcoats) were also substantial shareholders in the original company. The enterprise remained a family business, in the hands of Bernardin's three children, until 2005, when it changed hands. By this time the name "Le Crazy Horse de Paris" was used for the original venue and Crazy Horse Paris for one in Las Vegas (formerly La Femme) at the MGM Grand.

Along with its dancers, the Crazy Horse has also been a popular venue for many other artists, including magicians, jugglers, and mimes. Bernardin explained that he loved magic because it corresponded with his vision: "[Magic] is a dream. There is no show that is more dreamlike than a magic show. And what we do with the girls is magic, too, because they aren't as beautiful as you see them onstage. It's the magic of lights and costumes. These are my dreams and fascinations that I put onstage."

Under new shareholders and new management from 2005, Crazy Horse started featuring famous or prestigious artists performing for a limited number of shows, including Dita Von Teese, Carmen Electra, Arielle Dombasle, Pamela Anderson, Violet Chachki, Lisa from Blackpink and Karol G. They also hired Philippe Decouflé as director and choreographer for the show "Désirs", along with artistic director Ali Mahdavi. Kelly Brook appeared in the autumn of 2012 during a tour show in London. Limited-run shows were also created by red-soled shoe designer Christian Louboutin in 2012 and French lingerie priestess Chantal Thomass in 2016.

In 2012, the dancers went on strike for higher pay. Before the strike, which caused the cancellation of a high-profile revue for one day but generated a fantastic buzz for the cabaret, some sources mentioned a salary of €2,000 per month. Other sources said that settlement of the strike yielded a 15 percent pay raise. These numbers were denied by the management of the cabaret.

Katy Perry and Justin Trudeau made their first public outing as a couple at Crazy Horse Paris in 2026

== Film history ==
- In 1977, the cabaret created and appeared in a documentary film, known as Crazy-Horse, Paris-France, or Crazy Horse de Paris.
- Crazy Horse-Le Show: a 2004 documentary in DVD format.
- Crazy Horse, Paris: a 2009 documentary in DVD format. The video features a Neo-Burlesque performer Dita von Teese.
- Crazy Horse: a 2011 documentary by Frederick Wiseman.
- Beyoncé's music video for "Partition", directed by Jake Nava, was inspired by, and partially filmed at Crazy Horse. The video is part of her 2013 self-titled 'visual album.'
- A remake of Crazy Horse Paris' original song "But I Am a Good Girl" is performed by Christina Aguilera in the film "Burlesque". Christina Aguilera performed a few of her hits at Crazy Horse Paris for her 2025 film "Christmas in Paris".
- Crazy Horse Paris is featured in season four and five of "Emily in Paris". The character Mindy, played by Ashley Park, is a singer at the cabaret and an original act was created for the series, featuring the real dancers of Crazy Horse Paris.

== Public transit access ==
- Alma – Marceau
- Champs-Élysées – Clemenceau

== Other venues ==
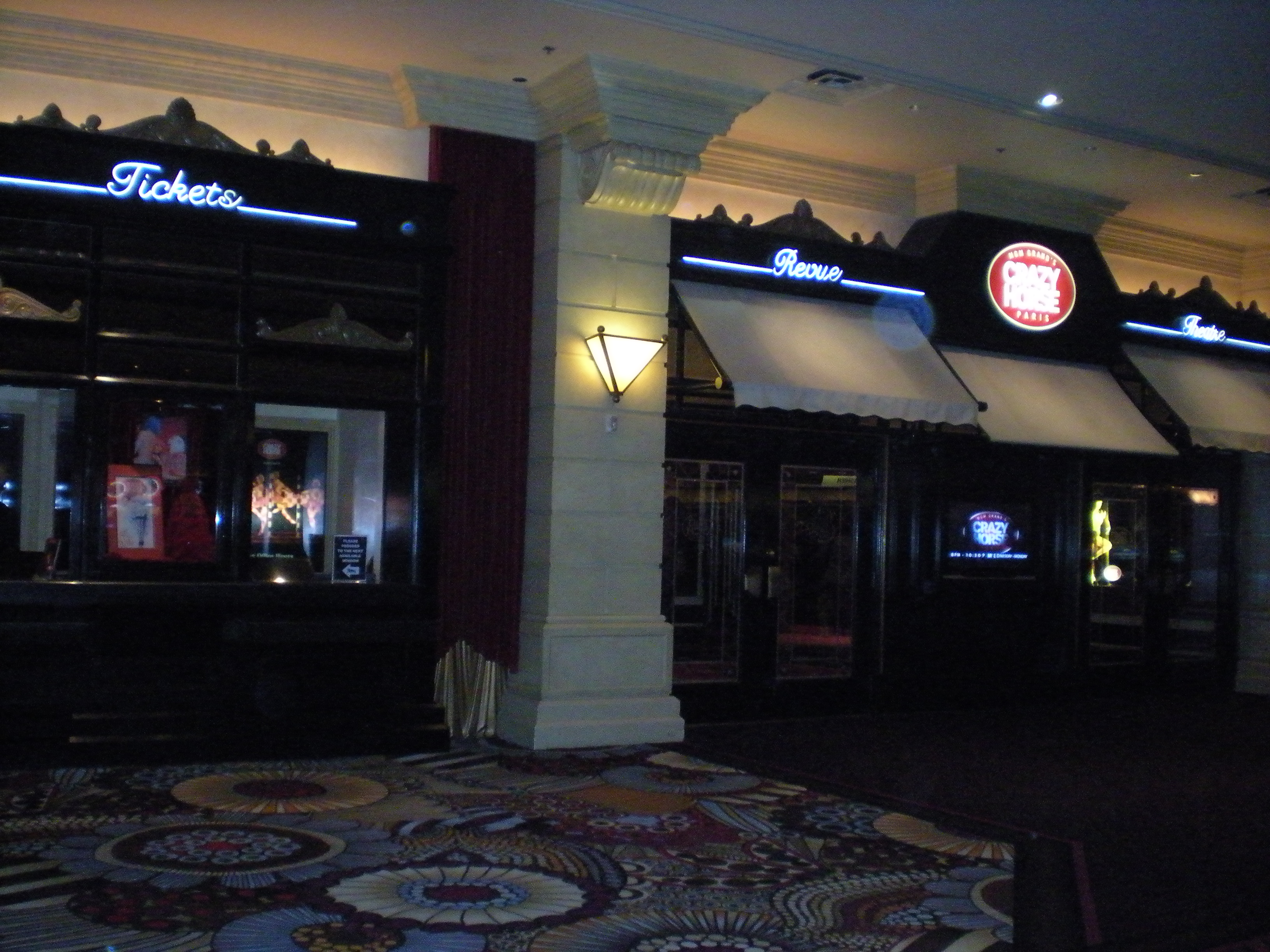
The former Crazy Horse Paris at MGM Grand in Las Vegas

Other entertainments with varying degrees of resemblance and similar names, but unaffiliated with the original, include:

- The Crazy Horse, Beirut, Lebanon
- Crazy Horse Too, Las Vegas
- Crazy Horse, Orlando, Florida
- Crazy Horse, Myrtle Beach, South Carolina
- Crazy Horse Gentlemen's Club, San Francisco
- Crazy Horse, Adelaide, Australia
- Crazy Horse, Gold Coast, Australia
- Crazy Horse, Winston-Salem, North Carolina
- Crazy Horse, Akron, Ohio
- Crazy Horse, Cleveland, Ohio
- Crazy Horse, Bedford Heights, Ohio
- Crazy Horse, Kaohsiung, Taiwan
- Crazy Horse Cabaret, Bronx, New York

== See also ==
- Sirens of TI
- Absinthe
- Moulin Rouge
- Le Lido
- List of strip clubs
- Folies Bergère
- Casino de Paris
- Paradis Latin
- Cabaret Red Light
- Tropicana Club
- Jubilee!
