= Expeditie Robinson 2018 (Belgium) =

- Season 1
- Presented by: Bartel Van Riet
- No. of days: 33
- No. of castaways: 17
- Winner: Robbe De Backer
- Runner-up: Nele Velghe
- Location: Caramoan, Philippines

Release
- Original network: VIER
- Original release: 6 September – 13 December 2018

Season chronology
- ← Previous; 2012 Next → 2020

Expeditie Robinson 2018 was the first season of the Belgian version of Swedish television series Expedition Robinson since the Belgian's exit from the co-production with the Dutch in 2012. In this season, seventeen Belgians compete in two tribes of eight where they compete for 33 days to see who will become Robinson 2018 and win €25,000. After 33 days, Robbe De Backer became the winner of Robinson 2018 after winning against Nele Velghe in a 6-1 jury vote. The season premiered on 6 September 2018.

== Finishing order ==
Contestant	Original Tribe	Tribal Swap	Merged Tribe	Finish
Lisa Ceulemans; 40, Edegem	South Team			1st Voted Out; Day 2
Thomas Francois Jacobs; 28, Antwerp	North Team			2nd Voted Out; Day 4
Jonas Gilles; 28, Tildonk	South Team			3rd Voted Out; Day 7
Oona Geeraerts; 35, Antwerp	South Team			4th Voted Out; Day 10
Angelo Delcroix; 37, Lauwe	South Team	South Team		5th Voted Out; Day 12
Gilles Paku; 25, Landen	South Team	North Team		6th Voted Out; Day 14
Emilie Koot; 27, Beveren	North Team	North Team		7th Voted Out; Day 16
Chloé Evangelista; 29, Kortrijk	South Team	South Team		Lost Challenge; Day 18
Lesley Dada; 35, Houthalen	North Team	North Team	Robinson	8th Voted Out; 1st Jury Member; Day 20
Annick Buyens; 47, Zoersel	North Team	South Team	Robinson	Quit; 2nd Jury Member; Day 22
Frederik "Fré" Leys; 31, Leuven	North Team	South Team	Robinson	9th Voted Out; 3rd Jury Member; Day 24
Imke De Bruyn; 21, Berlaar	North Team	North Team	Robinson	10th Voted Out; 4th Jury Member; Day 27
Luc Terium; 50, Kinrooi	South Team	South Team	Robinson	11th Voted Out; 5th Jury Member; Day 29
Anton Karton; 27, Brasschaat	North Team	South Team	Robinson	Lost Challenge; 6th Jury Member; Day 31
Arnaude Bogaert; 39, Heusden	North Team	North Team	Robinson	Lost Challenge; 7th Jury Member; Day 32
Nele Velghe; 36, Vlissegem	South Team	South Team	Robinson	Runner-Up; Day 33
Robbe De Backer; 30, Torhout	South Team	North Team	Robinson	Robinson; Day 33
