= Balcar =

Balcar (feminine: Balcarová) is a Czech surname. It is a variant of the surname Balzar, which was derived from the given name Balthazar. Notable people with the surname include:

- Bohuslav Balcar (1943–2017), Czech mathematician
- Dana Balcarová (born 1960), Czech politician and environmentalist
- Jindřich Balcar (1950–2013), Czech ski jumper
- Karel Balcar (born 1966), Czech painter
