= Arboretum Wespelaar =

Arboretum in Wespelaar, Belgium

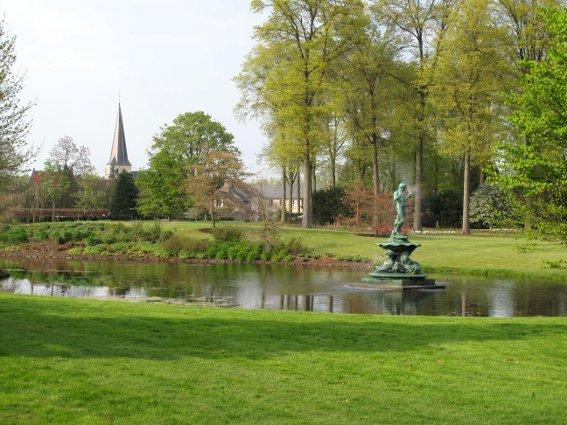
- Arboretum Wespelaar
- Interactive map of Arboretum Wespelaar
- Type: Arboretum
- Location: Wespelaar, Belgium
- Coordinates: 50.958564°N 4.634039°E
- Area: 50 acres (20 hectares)
- Open: Open to the public on Wednesdays and Sundays from April 1 to November 15
- Website: www.arboretumwespelaar.be

Arboretum Wespelaar is an arboretum in Wespelaar, Belgium.

== History ==
The grounds used to be private property of Elisabeth Willems, Viscountess de Spoelberch. their descendants kept the castle as private residence. The arboretum was started in 1984, as an extension of the dendrological collections of Philippe de Spoelberch, (great grandson of Elisabeth Willems) to the north of his estate of Herkenrode.

In 2007, the arboretum and its collections were donated to the Foundation Arboretum Wespelaar which was set up to guarantee the future of the collections and arrange for their opening to the public in 2011. Some 2000 different taxa can be seen on the 20 hectare grounds.

== Collection ==
The arboretum brings together trees and shrubs from around the world which can survive in the temperate Belgian climate. Arboretum Wespelaar houses many woody species large and small, including common and rare species, especially those that are threatened in the wild.

Some genera are particularly well represented: Acer, Magnolia, Rhododendron and Stewartia. In addition to these, one can find collections of other genera such as: Betula, Carpinus, Euonymus, Ilex, Tilia, Viburnum, Quercus, Styrax etc.

The Arboretum is also known for its yellow flowering Magnolias. Many Magnolias have been selected and named at the Arboretum, with the yellow Magnolia 'Daphne' being the most famous.

Many of Arboretum Wespelaar's trees and shrubs are to be found on the Red List of the IUCN (International Union for Conservation of Nature). By giving priority to wild collected plants, identified as endangered or critically endangered on these lists, the Arboretum hopes to contribute to the conservation of such plants.

Arboretum Wespelaar is a member of Botanic Gardens Conservation International, an international non-profit organisation that exists to ensure the worldwide conservation of threatened plants.

Arboretum Wespelaar is a part of ArbNet, an interactive, collaborative, international community of arboreta. Through ArbNet, arboreta around the world collaborate to conserve trees and tree collections. The ArbNet Arboretum Accreditation Program is the only global initiative to officially recognize arboreta based on a set of professional standards. There are 4 levels of accreditations, within which Level 4 is the highest level. Since 2016, Arboretum Wespelaar has been awarded a Level 4 Accreditation.

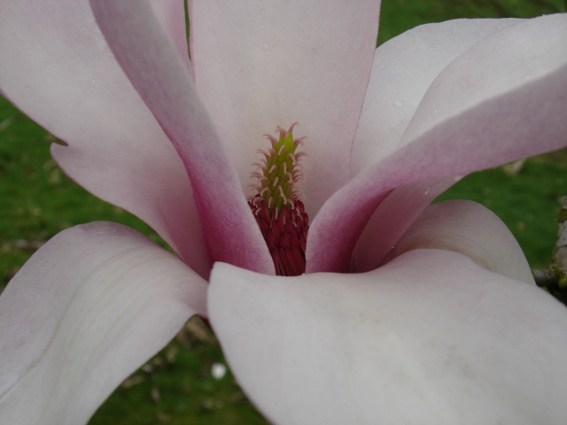
Magnolia 'Anne Rosse'

== Visits ==
The Arboretum can be visited on Wednesdays and Sundays from April 1 to November 15.
