= Balzar =

Balzar may refer to:

- Balzar (surname)
- Balzar, Ecuador, a town in Ecuador
