= Christophe de Spoelberch =

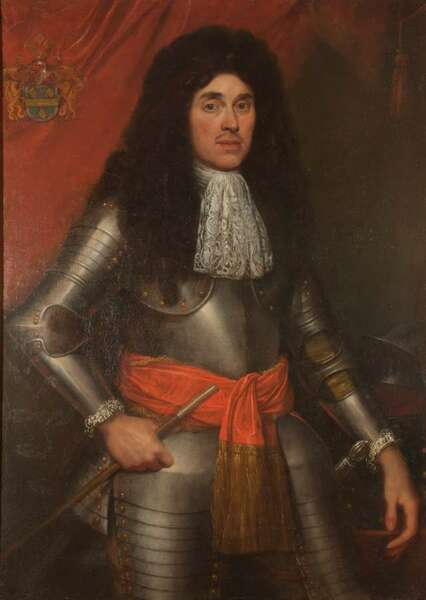
Portrait of Christoffel van Spoelberch, painted by Balthasar van Lemens, collection KU Leuven

Christoffel van Spoelberch, Lord of Lovenjoel (1633–1707) was the youngest son of Ferdinand van Spoelberch, Lord of Lovenjoel and Anne de Grimaldi.

After the death of his father in 1675 he became Lord of Lovenjoel. He married Lady Johanna Catharina Becx, with descendance upon the current day.

During his career he was Lord Mayor of Leuven.

== Ancestry ==
Ancestors of Christophe de Spoelberch

4. Jan Baptist van Spoelberch
2. Ferdinand van Spoelberch; Lord of Lovenjoel
5. Mary Magdalene Garet
Christoffel van Spoelberch, Lord of Lovenjoel
6. Simon de Grimaldi
3. Anne de Grimaldi
7. Marie Joigny de Pamele
