= Haacht =

- Municipality
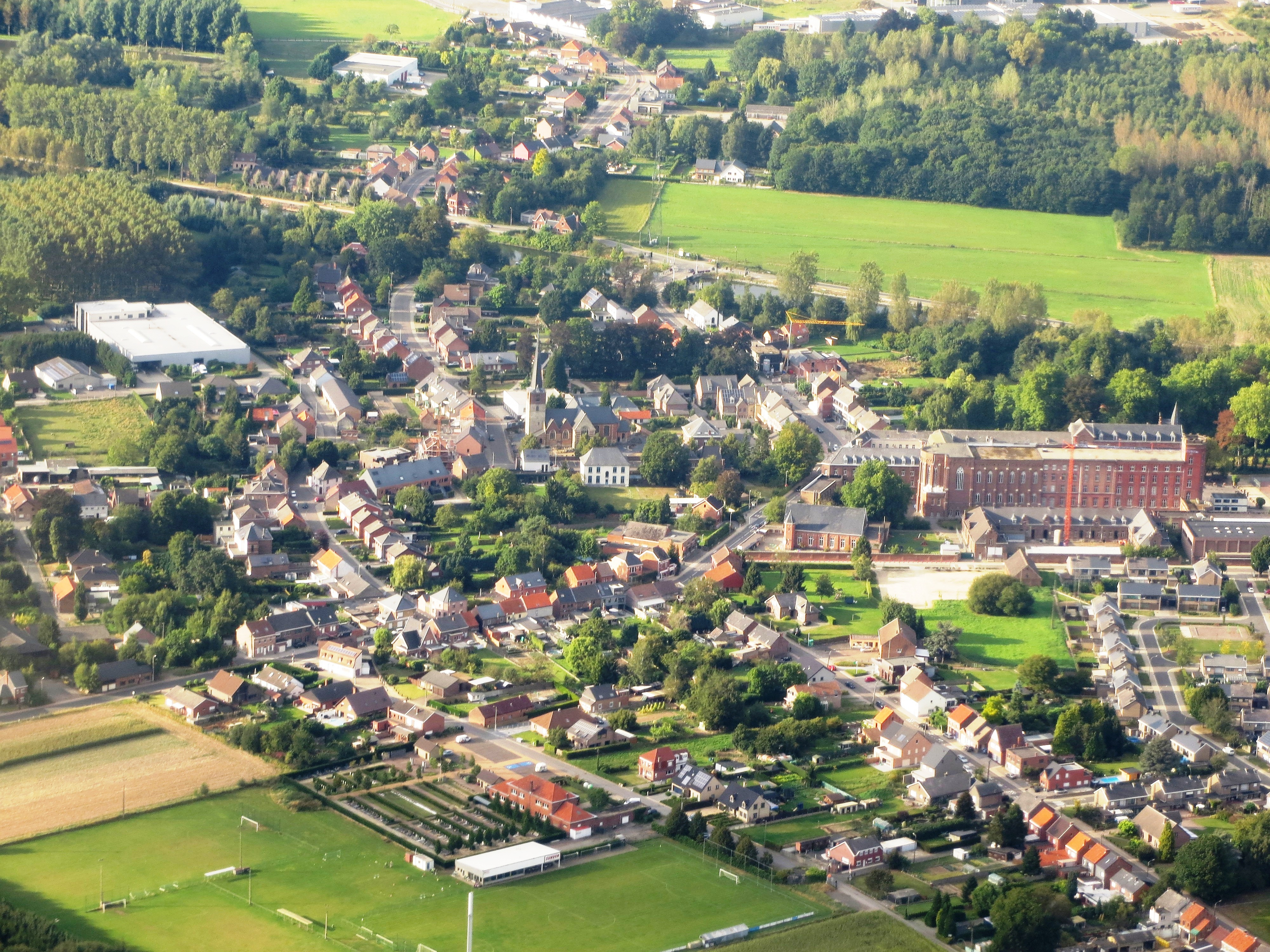
- Tildonk

- Flag Coat of arms

- Location of Haacht in Flemish Brabant
- Interactive map of Haacht
- Location in Belgium
- Coordinates: 50°59′N 04°38′E
- Country: Belgium
- Community: Flemish Community
- Region: Flemish Region
- Province: Flemish Brabant
- Arrondissement: Leuven

Government
  - Mayor: Steven Swiggers (OpenVLD)
  - Governing parties: OpenVld, Vooruit, CD&V

Area
  - Total: 30.74 km^{2} (11.87 sq mi)

Population (2025-01-01)
  - Total: 15,661
  - Density: 509.5/km^{2} (1,320/sq mi)
- Postal codes: 3150
- NIS code: 24033
- Area codes: 016, 015
- Website: www.haacht.be

Haacht (Dutch pronunciation: [ɦaːxt]) is a municipality located in the Belgian province of Flemish Brabant. The municipality comprises the towns of Haacht proper, Kelfs, Tildonk, Wakkerzeel and Wespelaar.

In 2023, Haacht had a total population of 15,465. It is reported to have a population density of 505 inhabitants per km^{2}.

== Attractions ==
Special attractions in Haacht are:

- The church St.-Remigius, of which some walls still date the original construction from the year 1281.
- The Anti-Tank canal, a defensive line built in 1939 as part of the K-W Line, to protect against German attack. It proved ineffective, as the invading Germans took a wide detour around it. In 1997 the nature preservation group Natuurpunt made it a protected natural area.
- The brewery of Haacht, the biggest Belgian brewery that is still in Belgian ownership and the third Belgian brewery regarding marketshare. The brewery is named after the municipality of Haacht but is actually located within the borders of neighbouring municipality Boortmeerbeek.
- The new sporting facilities 'Den Dijk', opened in 2003, with a separate gymnastics hall.
- It also has the nearest train station in its surroundings: Haacht Railway Station.
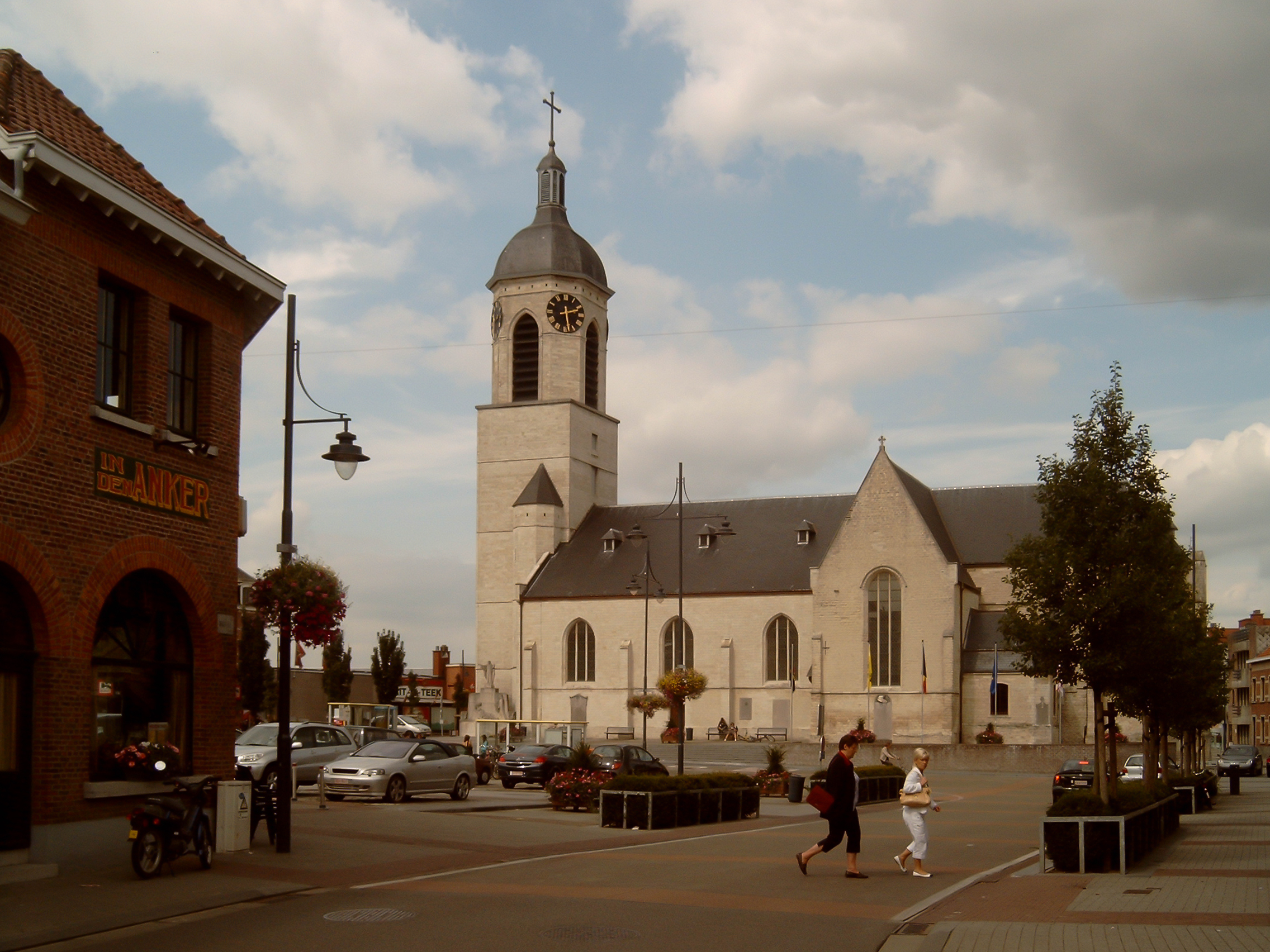
Sint Remigius church

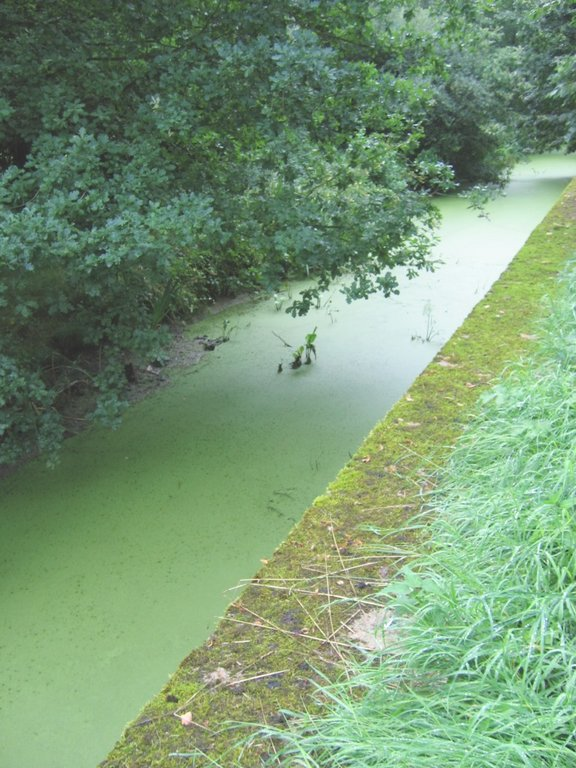
Anti-Tank canal, built to protect against the German tank attacks during World War II, today a preserved natural area

== Municipal government ==
Haacht has a city council of 23 members.

== Transport ==
Haacht has three railway stops: Haacht, Wespelaar-Tildonk and Hambos.
