= Balzar (surname) =

Balzar is a surname. Originally a German surname, it was derived from the given name Balthazar. The Czech variant of the surname is Balcar. Notable people with the surname include:

- Andreas Balzar (c. 1769–1797), German robber
- Fred B. Balzar (1880–1934), American politician
- Joan Balzar (1928–2016), Canadian artist
- Robert Balzar (born 1962), Czech jazz musician

== See also ==
- Balzar, Ecuador
