= Balthazar (given name) =

- Gender: Masculine

Origin
- Origin: Akkadian
- Meaning: Bel protects the King

Other names
- Alternative spelling: Balthasar; Balthassar; Baltazar; Balthazaar
- Variant form: Baghdasar
- Related names: Belshazzar
- See also: Balthazar (magus)

Balthazar (also spelled Balthasar, Balthassar, Balthazaar or Baltazar), from Akkadian 𒂗𒈗𒋀 Bel-shar-uzur, meaning "Bel protects the King" is the name commonly attributed to Balthazar (magus), one of the Three Wise Men, at least in the west. Though no names are given in the Gospel of Matthew, this was one of the names the Western church settled on in the 8th century, based on the original meaning, though other names were used by Eastern churches. It is an alternate form of the Babylonian king Belshazzar, mentioned in the Book of Daniel.

The Armenian variation of the name is Baghdasar.

== People with the name ==
- Balthazar Alvarez (1533–1580), Spanish Catholic mystic
- Balthasar Bekker (1634–1698), Dutch philosopher
- Baltasar Brum (1883–1933), Uruguayan president
- Baldassare Castiglione (1478–1529), Italian Renaissance author
- Baltasar Corrada del Río (1935–2018), Puerto Rican politician
- Balthasar Eggenberger (died 1493), Austrian entrepreneur and financier in the Holy Roman Empire
- Baltasar Garzón (born 1955), Spanish judge
- Balthasar Gérard (c. 1557–1584), assassin of William I of Orange
- Balthazar Getty (born 1975), American actor and great-grandson of J. Paul Getty
- Balthasar Glättli (born 1972), Swiss politician
- Baltasar Gracián y Morales (1601–1658), Spanish Baroque prose writer
- Balthasar Hubmaier (c. 1480–1528), German Anabaptist leader
- Balthazar Klossowski de Rola (1908–2001), birth name of twentieth-century artist Balthus
- Baltasar Lopes da Silva (1907–1989), Cape Verdean writer
- Balthazar P. Melick (1770–1835), founder of Chemical Bank
- Baltazar Maria de Morais Júnior (born 1959), Brazilian footballer
- Balthasar Ferdinand Moll (1717–1785), Baroque sculptor
- Balthasar de Monconys (1611–1665), French magistrate
- Balthasar Moncornet (c. 1600–1668), French engraver
- Balthasar Neumann (1687–1753) German engineer and architect
- Balthasar Oomkens von Esens (died 1540), 16th century Frisian rebel (two of whose brothers were named Caspar and Melchior)
- Balthasar Regis (died 1757), Canon of Windsor
- Balthasar Russow (1536–1600), Estonian chronicler
- Balthasar van Lemens (1637–1704), Flemish painter
- Balthazar Johannes Vorster (1915–1983), apartheid-era South African Prime Minister and President
- McLeod John Baltazar Bethel-Thompson (born 1988), American football quarterback
- Hans Urs von Balthasar (1905–1988), Swiss Roman Catholic theologian and priest
- Vraîe Cally Balthazaar (born 1985), Sri Lankan politician

== Fictional characters with the name ==
=== Film ===
- Balthazar, the donkey in the French film Au hasard Balthazar (1966)
- Balthasar, a demon in the film Constantine (2005) played by Gavin Rossdale
- Comte Balthazar de Bleuchamp, a pseudonym of the villain Ernst Stavro Blofeld in the James Bond novel On Her Majesty's Secret Service and the film of the same name
- Balthasar, a supporting character in the film The Scorpion King (2002) played by actor Michael Clarke Duncan
- Balthazar Blake, a thousand-year-old sorcerer, protagonist of the film The Sorcerer's Apprentice (2010) played by Nicolas Cage
- Balthazar Bratt, a supervillain and former child star, main antagonist of the film Despicable Me 3 (2017) voiced by Trey Parker
- Edgar Balthazar, a butler, main antagonist of the film The Aristocats (1970) voiced by Roddy Maude-Roxby
- Balthazar M. Edison, male human who became the villain Krall in the film Star Trek Beyond (2016)
- Balthazar Malone, the wealthy teenage protagonist of the film Our Hero, Balthazar (2025) played by actor Jaeden Martell

=== Gaming ===
- Balthazar, the god of war and fire in the online game Guild Wars
- Balthazar, a fictional monk from Baldur's Gate II: Throne of Bhaal
- Balthasar (Old Man Bal), Nikolai Balthasar and Maria Balthasar, characters from the Square game Xenogears
- The primary antagonist in the Xbox game Azurik: Rise of Perathia
- The name of a minotaur and a lair in Might and Magic VIII
- Balthasar Gelt, a character in the Warhammer Fantasy universe
- Belthasar, one of the three Gurus who assist the main party in the RPG Chrono Trigger
- Baltasar Isenkopf, an inventor from Pentiment
- Balthasar, a random encounter in Kingdom Come: Deliverance II

=== Novels ===
- Balthazar Cherbonneau, a physician and magician in the novella Avatar by Théophile Gautier.
- Balthasar, a character in The Death Gate Cycle books
- Balthazar More, a character in the Evernight series introduced in the Evernight series
- Bastian Balthazar Bux, the main character in the book The Neverending Story
- Balthazar, The Hound of Count Kaliovzky in the book The Red Necklace
- Jacob Balthazar, the wood sculptor murdered in the story Tintin and the Broken Ear
- Balthasar, a Tiger tank gunner in The Last Citadel: A Novel of the Battle of Kursk by David L. Robbins
- Balthasar, a supporting character in Ben-Hur: A Tale of the Christ, and its various adaptations
- Balthazar Claes, the main character of Honore de Balzac's The Quest of the Absolute in the series La Comédie humaine
- Balthazar (comics), a character in the Marvel Comics universe
- Balthazar Abrabanel, a character in 1632

=== Plays ===
- Balthasar, a minor character in Romeo and Juliet
- Balthazar, Portia's masculine alter-ego, as well as a minor character in Shakespeare's The Merchant of Venice
- Balthasar, a singer and a follower of Don Pedro in Shakespeare's comedy Much Ado About Nothing
- Balthazar, a merchant in Shakespeare's comedy The Comedy of Errors
- Prince Balthazar, son of the Portuguese Viceroy, in Thomas Kyd's The Spanish Tragedy (1592)
- Baalthazar Macaw, an opera singing macaw in Robert J. Sherman's Love Birds (2015)

=== Television ===
- Birk Balthazar, the father of Sofia Balthazar in Sofia the First
- Balthazar, a demon in the episode "Bad Girls" of the TV series Buffy the Vampire Slayer
- Lord Balthazar, the godfather of Gargamel and one of the main antagonists in The Smurfs
- Belthazor, alternate name of the character Cole Turner in the TV series Charmed, portrayed by Julian McMahon
- Balthazar, an angel in the TV series Supernatural, portrayed by Sebastian Roché
- Balthasar, one of three cooperating supercomputers in the anime series Neon Genesis Evangelion
- Balthazar, the dog on the British sitcom Vicious
- Baltazar, the main villain in the CGI Doctor Who story The Infinite Quest
- Balthazar, a stuffed bear who was the leader on Jim Henson's The Secret Life of Toys
- Balthazar Cavendish, friend of Vinnie Dakota in Milo Murphy's Law

== See also ==
- Balthazar (disambiguation)
