= Paul de Cordon =

French photographer

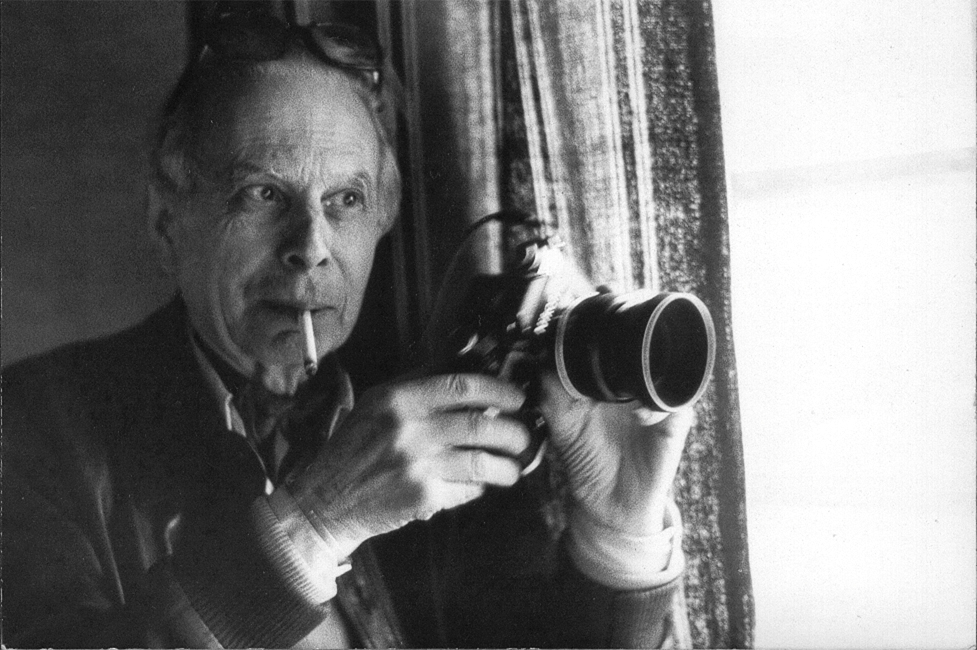
- Born: 1908; Toulouse , France
- Died: 1998 (aged 89－90)
- Occupation: Photographer
- Known for: circus photograph

Paul de Cordon (1908–1998) was a French photographer known for his circus photographs.

== Early years ==
Paul de Cordon was born in Toulouse in to a Savoyan noble family. He was the son of a cavalry officer. During his childhood, he spent several years in Mainz, Germany, where his father was garrisoned. It was in Mainz that he began taking photographs using a small camera given to him by his father. Later, he said that he had spent long hours in the shop of an old German photographer, and that is how he began to learn photography. While he lived in Germany he became interested in the circus. In the 1920s, German circuses such as the one run by Adolf Althoff were travelling across the country with large crews and many animals.

After his Lycée years, he enrolled in the cavalry. In the army he spent most of his time training horses and riding in steeple chases and military cross. He participated to more than 500 races on various French and European race fields and sometimes won.

In 1940, during World War II, he was captured in the Ardennes. After two unsuccessful escape attempts, he was sent to Colditz. In 1945, the United States Army set him free. He stayed in the army for a few more months and was affected to the Cadre Noir in Saumur.

== Second life ==
Cordon met film director Jean Devaivre, a figure in the French Resistance, while he was an underground activist and working for the German-owned Continental Films in Paris. Devaivre asked Cordon to be his assistant. Cordon had always been attracted to the stage, having briefly attended Charles Dullin acting sessions in the 1930s, but his interest in photography was also a key factor in the decision.

In the early 1950s Cordon decided to become a professional photographer. For many years he worked in his Paris studio for fashion designers and advertising agencies. He began developing a huge personal project on circus and cabaret. He spent many nights with his camera at the Crazy Horse Saloon, at Medrano or at the Bouglione brothers' Cirque d’Hiver. He also travelled around the world visiting circuses. During these trips, Cordon developed strong links with old circus families such as Schumann, Rancy, Knie and Gruss, with whom he shared a same passion for horses. At this time he wrote several articles for the Swiss annual Information Hippique on circus horses and riders.

== Circus instants ==
"While watching this obstinate quest for the perfect gesture, I realized that I was living what I had always been expecting : a circus instant". Instants de Cirque is the title of Cordon's most famous book and the concept he described as key to his circus images. This "instant" has some similarity with the "decisive moment" evoked by Henri Cartier-Bresson; it is the opposite of luck or accident, but rather a tiny fragment of time when the photographer’s eye catches something that other eyes do not.

One of Cordon's photographs, "Three Zebras", was shot at the Amsterdam Zoo in 1957 and published internationally. Another photograph, "Ami, Gilbert Houcke and Prince", differs from conventional circus photography in that it was taken backstage, without a circus ring, stage lighting, costume, or audience, depicting instead an animal trainer in an informal setting.

Cordon did not like to be described as a circus photographer. He loved circuses, but was not much interested in the documentary aspect often linked to circus photography. He used to say, "I am looking for the very style of an artist, that’s what I’m interested in". The photographs he took revealed aspects of the subject’s character and personality. He had a talent for capturing what other probably did not see, and was above all interested in producing images that would translate an emotion and be different. This is probably the reason why so many circus artists wanted to be photographed by him.

== Crazy Horse Saloon ==
Cordon met Alain Bernardin at the very beginning of the Crazy Horse Saloon. The former antique dealer who had just invented a new cabaret and the former cavalry officer shared the same dislike for conventional rules and the same interest in stage shows. Cordon spent long hours at the Crazy, where he took many pictures. He liked the company of models and dancers, and they trusted him when he came into their dressing room with his camera. This part of his work remains lesser known than his circus photographs.

== Technique ==
Cordon used different cameras. His 1950’s photographs were made either with a Rolleiflex 6x6 or with a 35 mm Leica; afterwards, he almost exclusively used Nikon cameras. Cordon never used a flash when not in his studio. He liked to work in the dark room and to do prints of his negatives, considering printing as a second shooting. However, when the prints were for books or exhibitions he had them done by a professional printer.

Cordon was also very interested in studio work, and set up his own studio in the late fifties where he shot advertisement and fashion photographs. In his studio, Cordon worked mostly with a Hasselblad camera but also used a Linhof view camera. He loved working with studio flash and was an early user of the Balcar flash. Dick Balli, the founder of the company, became one of his close friends.

== Books by Paul de Cordon ==
- Girls of the Crazy Horse Saloon Verlagspresse 1971
- Instants de Cirque Edition du chêne 1977
- Le Cadre Noir Julliard 1981
