= Tildonk =

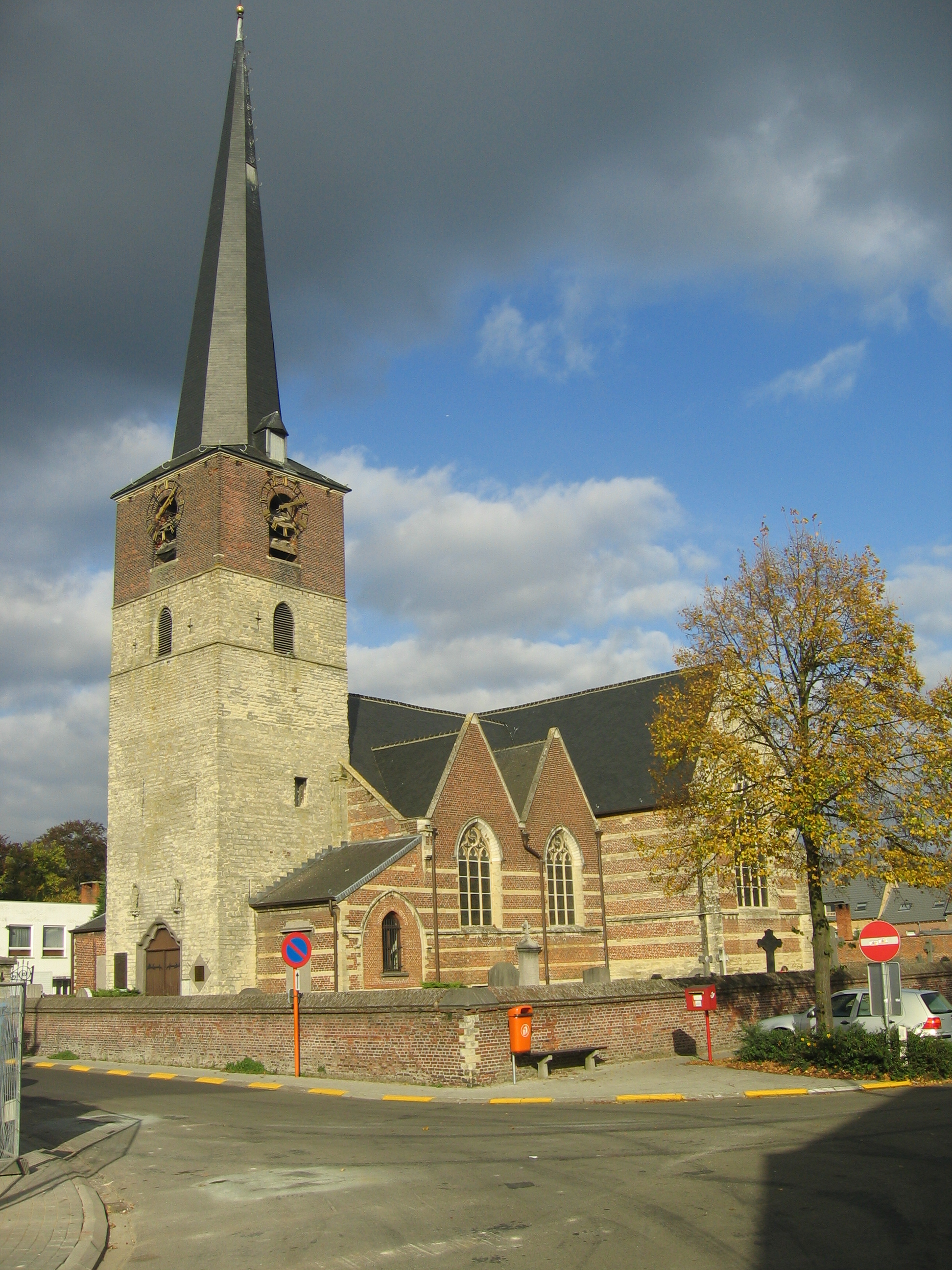
- Saint John the Baptist Church

- Location in Belgium
- Coordinates: 50°56′N 4°38′E
- Country: Belgium
- Region: Flemish Region
- Community: Flemish Community
- Province: Flemish Brabant
- Arrondissement: Leuven
- Municipality: Haacht
- Postal codes: 3150
- Location of Haacht in Flemish Brabant

Tildonk is a village located in the Belgian province of Flemish Brabant and, since 1977, is part of the municipality of Haacht, together with Wespelaar, Wakkerzeel and Kelfs. It has a total area of 7.31 km².

== History ==
Traces of civilization have been found from the period of around 3000 BCE between the hamlet Hambos and adjacent Kelfs. Later there was a Gallic settlement at about the same location. The oldest mention of Tildonk occurred in 1107 in the family name of Reinerus de Thieldunck.

The name Tildonk is the joining of 2 medieval words: til (forest) and donk (elevation). During the 12th century the knights van Tildonk, pledged to the Duke of Brabant, lived in two mottes: Oudenborg and Nieuwenborg (where the current Kasteeltje is located). Tildonk was elevated to the title of county in 1699 as part of the fiefdom of Charles L'Archier. Later it came into the hands of the noble house of Lalaing. Count Maximilian de Lalaing was the most prominent de Lalaing lord of Tildonk.

Since 1750, Tildonk is traversed by the Leuven-Rupel canal and, since 1837, by the Mechelen-Leuven railroad line.

In 1821, the priest Joannes Cornelius Martinus Lambertz started the Ursulines convent that later became the "mother convent" of numerous new institutions spread over 4 continents. The convent was renowned for its international school. The stylish Art Nouveau hall for parties was used as a setting in various films.

== Protected cultural heritage ==
- The village centre (convent, church, cemetery, rectory)
- The lock and lock house
- The farm of de Lalaing (Kasteeltje)
- The Our Lady of Comfort Chapel (Onze-Lieve-Vrouw van Troostkapel)

== Coat of arms ==
In 1967, the municipality of Tildonk took over the escutcheon of the noble family de Lalaing: an oval escutcheon of gules with 10 united diamonds of silver, placed 3, 3, 3 and 1, the escutcheon held by two golden griffins looking backwards, topped with a crown of 3 fleurons separated by 3 groups of 3 pearls.

== Further reading on Tildonk ==
Gordts J., Tilloenk vruger, Tildonk, 2006.
