= Ferdinand van Spoelberch =

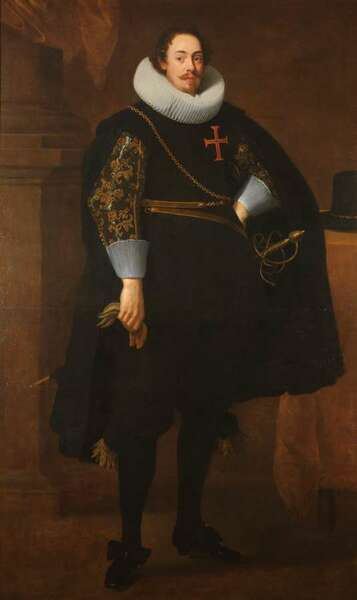
Portrait of Ferdinand van Spoelberch, painted by Gaspar de Crayer, collection KU Leuven

Ferdinand van Spoelberch (1596–1675), Knight of the Order of Christ, Lord of Lovenjoul, was an officer in the Army of Flanders during the Eighty Years' War

== Life ==
Van Spoelberch was born in Brussels on 13 August 1596, the son of Jan Baptist van Spoelberch and Maria Magdalena Garet.

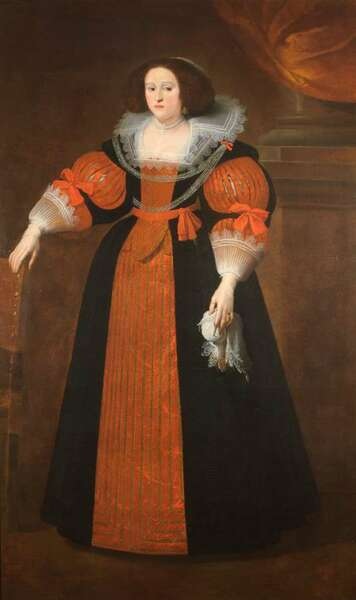
Portrait of Anna de Grimaldi de Morosana, painted by Gaspar de Crayer, collection KU Leuven

In April 1621 he accompanied Ferdinand van Boisschot on a diplomatic mission to France. On 12 January 1626 he married Anna de Grimaldi of Morazane (died 6 January 1634), daughter of Simon de Grimaldi, secretary to the Privy Council of the Habsburg Netherlands. A portrait of the couple has been attributed to Gaspar de Crayer. They had four children: Anna Maria (1627-1627), Maria Magdalena (1628-1635), Karel Frans (1630-1692) and Christoffel (1633-1707).

Van Spoelberch became lord of Lovenjoel on 17 July 1630, and by letters patent of 23 February 1633 was appointed meier of the ten villages subject to the aldermen of Lubbeek (now in Flemish Brabant). He played a significant part in the defence of Leuven (1635), in recognition of which Philip IV of Spain on 31 March 1649 made him a lord in his own right.

On 10 February 1662 Pope Alexander VII appointed van Spoelberch a Knight of the Order of Christ. He was invested by Andreas Creusen, Archbishop of Mechelen, on 13 April 1662.

Van Spoelberch died in Leuven on 8 February 1675, and was buried in the family vault in the church of the Recollects.

The work Brusselschen Blom-hof van Cupido (Brussels, 1641) was dedicated to him by the author, Willem van der Borcht.
