= Philippe de Spoelberch =

Belgian businessman

- Born: 23 May 1941 (age 85)
- Occupations: Businessman and dendrologist

Viscount Philippe de Spoelberch (23 May 1941) is a Belgian businessman and dendrologist.

== Family ==
He is the son of Vicomte Werner de Spoelberch (1902-1987) and Eléonore de Haas de Teichen (1916). He is married to Diane, Vicomtesse de Jonghe d'Ardoye.

== Career ==
He is an administrator of the InBev-Baillet Latour Fund, and a former member of the board of the Brazilian conglomerate InBev, one of the biggest breweries in the world. He is one of Belgium's wealthiest people with an estimated fortune of over €3 billion.

A keen gardener he is président of the Belgische Dendrologie Belge. He is also President of the International Dendrology Society. He was awarded the Veitch Memorial Medal of the Royal Horticultural Society in 2003.

In 2007 he donated the Arboretum Wespelaar to the Foundation Arboretum Wespelaar, which was set up to guarantee the future of the collections and arrange for their opening to the public in 2011.

== Bibliography ==
- Bomen in België : dendrologische inventaris 1987 - 1992 / Jean-Claude Baudouin, Philippe de Spoelberch, Jef Van Meulder. -Brussel : Stichting Spoelberch-Artois, 1992
- Arboretum Robert Lenoir : molen van Bardonwez te Rendeux / Philippe de Spoelberch, Jean-Claude Baudouin
