= Karel Balcar =

Czech painter

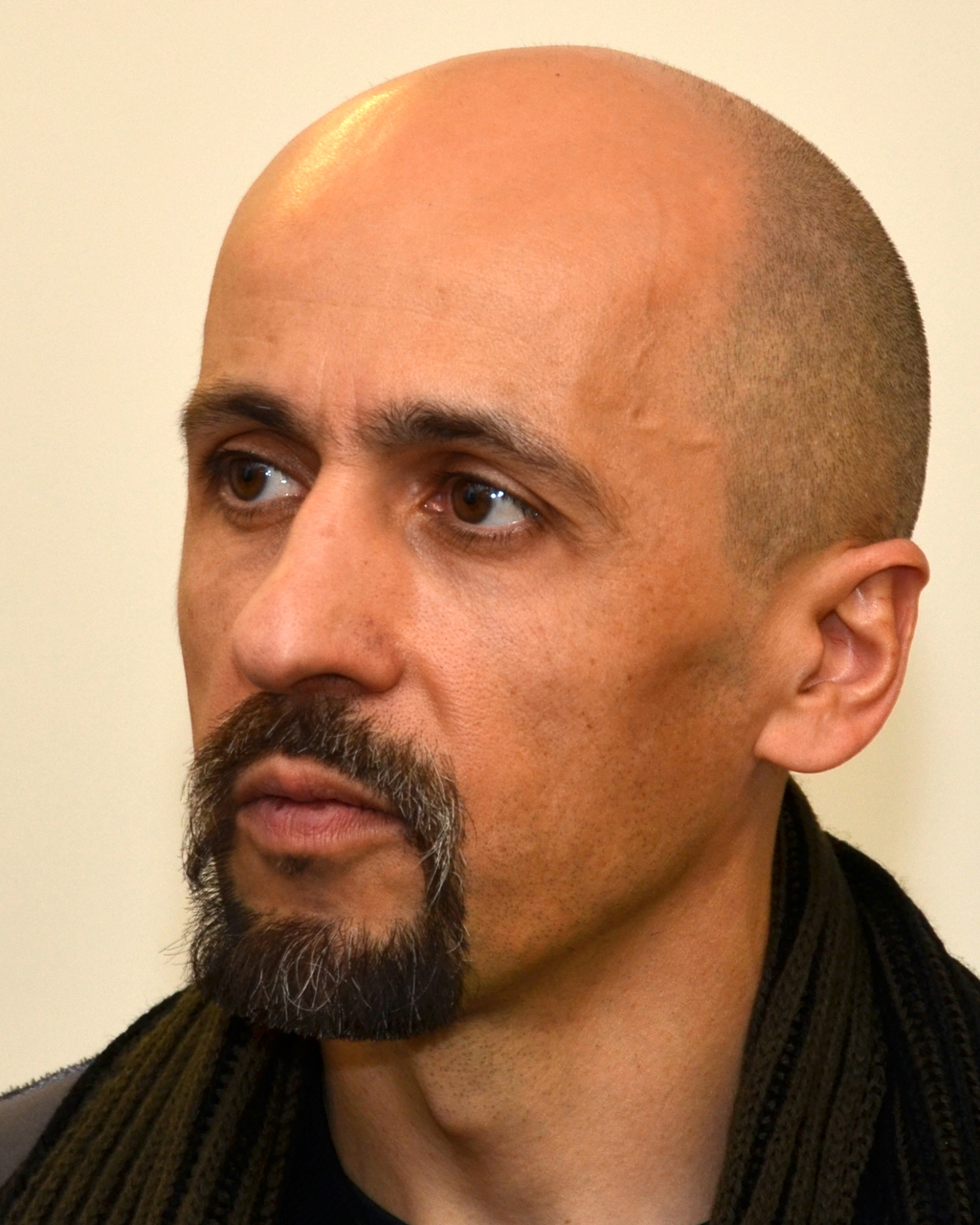
Karel Balcar (2015)

Karel Balcar (born 1966 in Lanškroun) is a Czech painter.

== Life ==
Balcar studied at the Czech Technical University in Prague (1984-1985) and at the University of Economics, Prague (1986-1987). In 1992 he enrolled Academy of Fine Arts in Prague and graduated in 1999 from Studio of Classical Painting Techniques of professor Zdeněk Beran. Most of his exhibitions since then have been in Prague, including venues such as the Liechtenstein Palace, town hall and the Rudolfinum but also the cities of Brno, Hradec Králové and at the Czech Centre in New York City.

He lives and works in Prague.

== Work ==
Motto: What I regard as important I paint, especially the important things that fascinate me.

A selection-oriented approach to the concept of portrayal painting, the type of specialized orientation on figures, along with characteristic content, distinguishes Karel Balcar's work from the majority of mainstream production in the Czech Republic – a conviction which has been confirmed by all the exhibits he has taken part in. Nonetheless, when one accounts for what the recent and contemporary events of the richly stratified pluralist scene of modern art in the world, it can be said with a clean conscience that an entirely evident and cogent context is at work here.

In his voluminous publication Artoday, Edward Lucie-Smith writes: "One of the most striking developments in the art of the past thirty years is the fashion in which many artists have started to re-examine the pre-Modernist past."

“Contemporary artists have, in fact, made an interesting discovery: as a result of the gulf between 20th century art and art of a distant past, they have found that there is something held in common with all the works of the masters of old – diversity – such as was once attributed only to art that was not of western origin.“ Some – mostly younger – artists are fascinated by this absurd situation. So as to avoid the danger of convention in overly cheap modern academism that runs to weeds everything in an intensely base form, they rather make a radical return to the past.

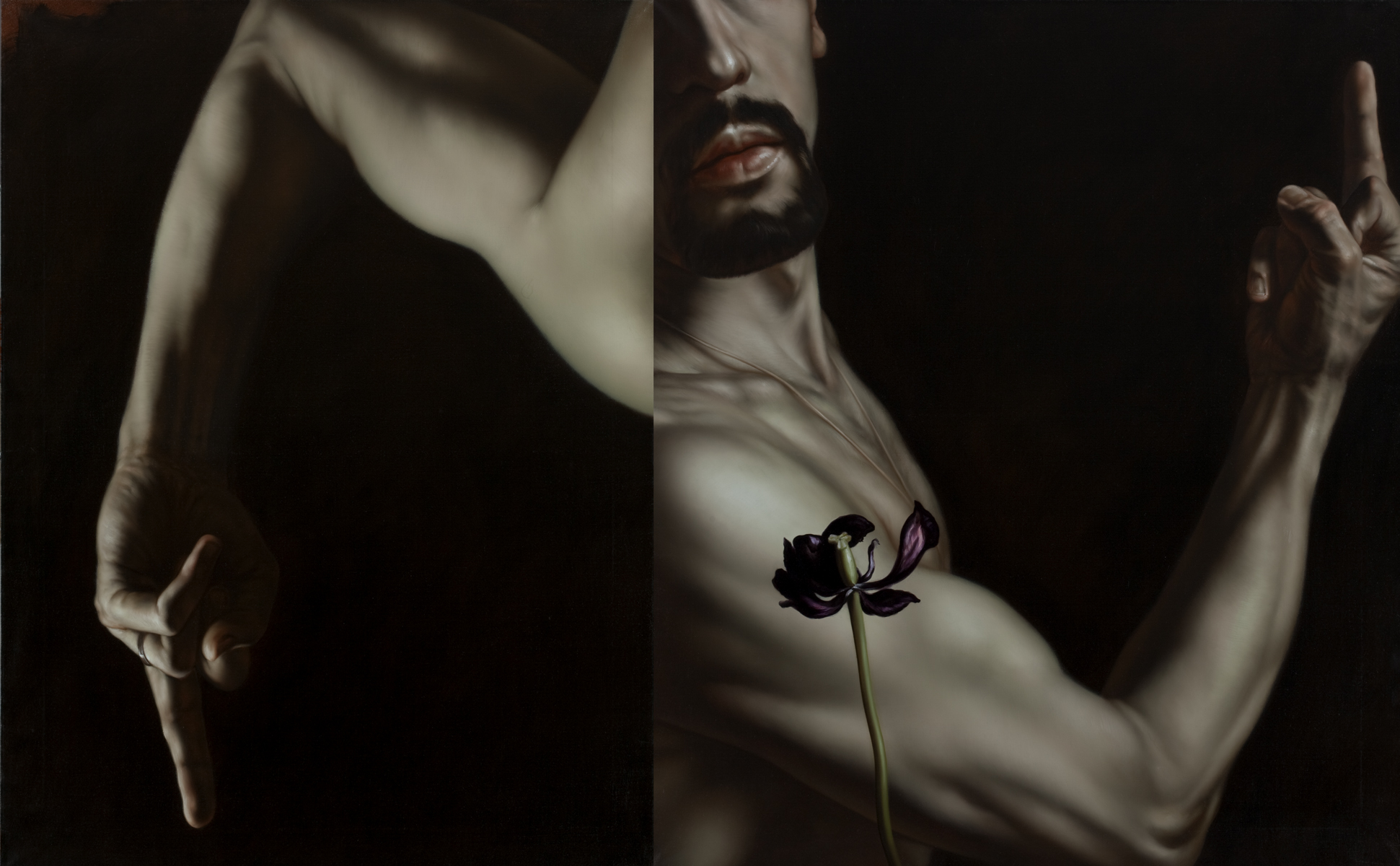
Karel Balcar, Man with The Finger, oil on canvas, 136x220 cm, 2009

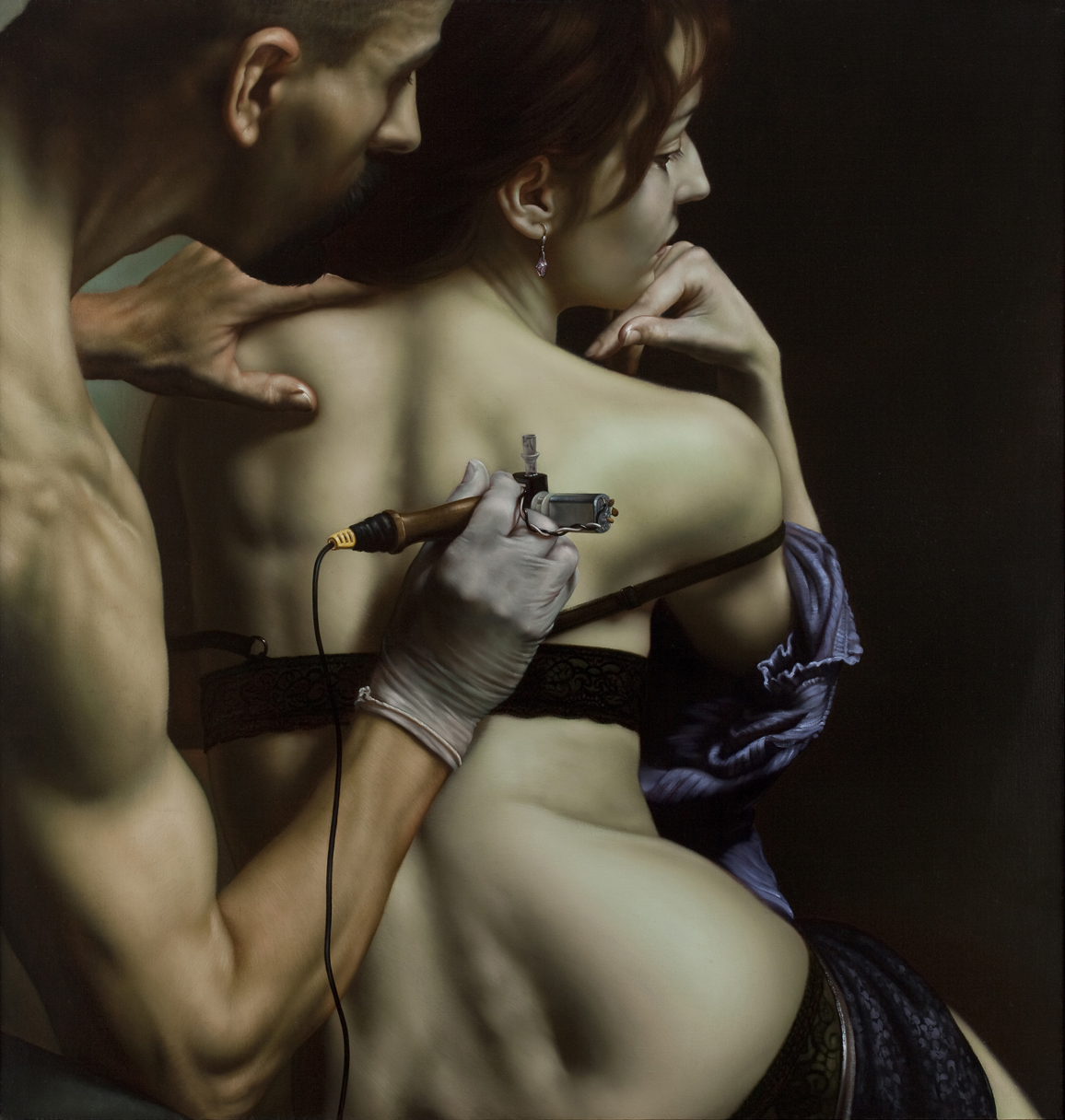
Karel Balcar, T2, oil on canvas, 187x178 cm, 2010

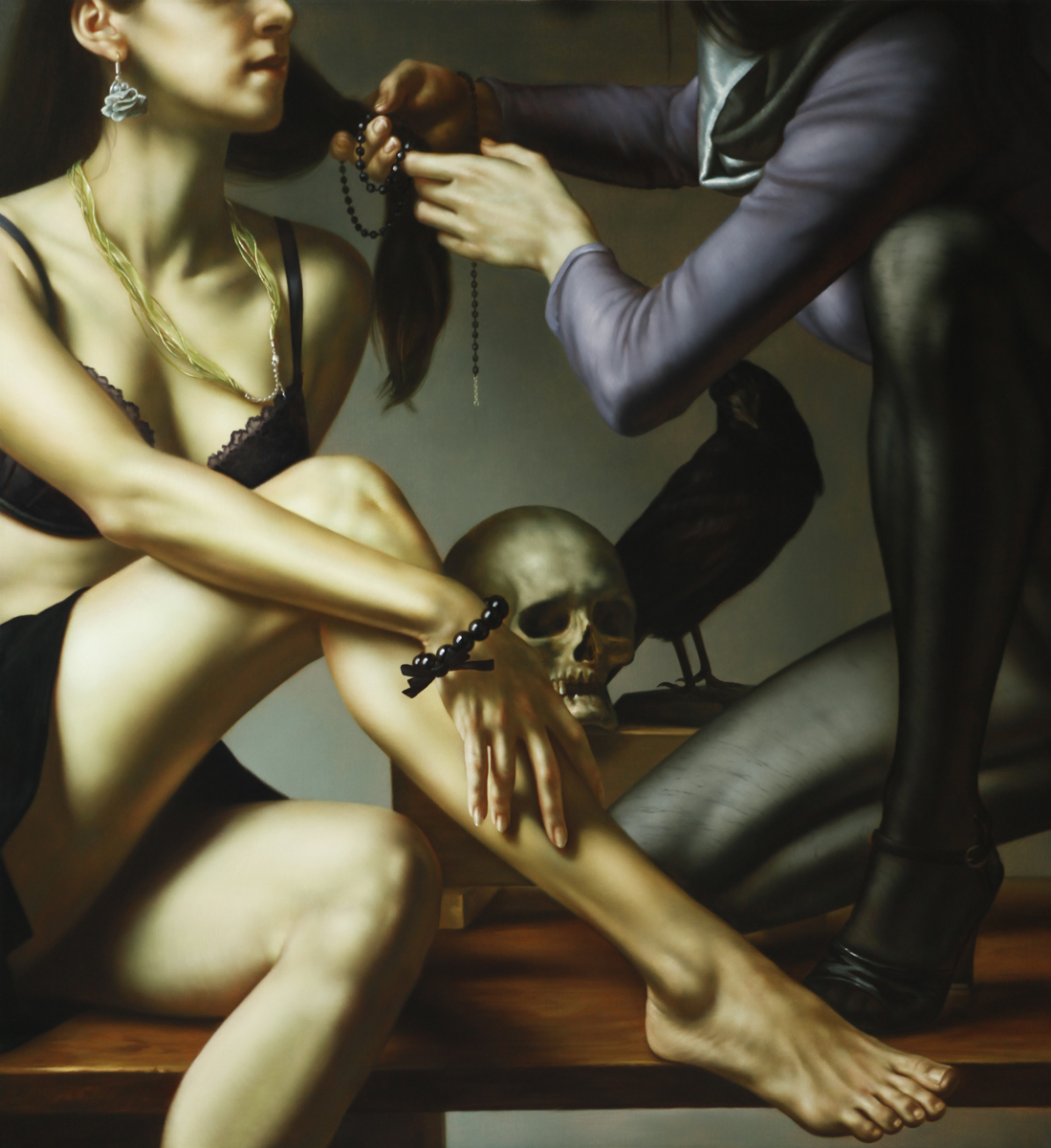
Entering Renaissance, oil on canvas, 141x132 cm, 2014

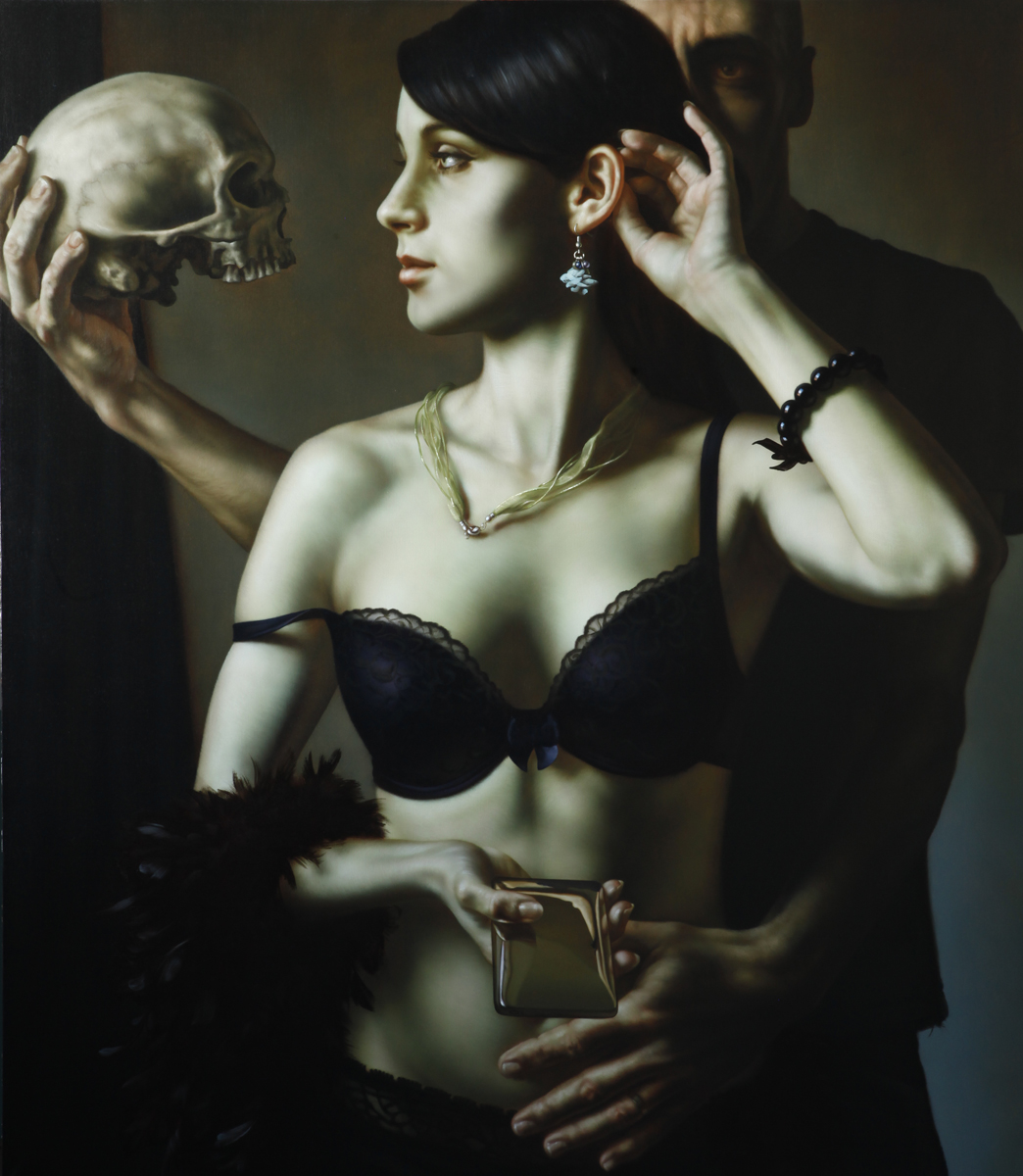
Karel Balcar, Send Me to the Future, oil on canvas, 150x132 cm, 2014

They have begun to relate to their own European traditions as if to something remote and almost foreign, and treat it likewise without scruple. As both a direct and indirect consequence of manifold skepticism towards perspectives of contemporary civilization, it is possible to find the key amongst a great many of today’s artists, to the tendency of regressions to form portrayal, the legitimate components of which are also a path leading to the exploration of pictorial memory.

The work of Karel Balcar can be categorized (even period-wise) among these contemporary endeavours, which have actually appeared throughout the entire course of the second half of the century, and which draws on the traditions of classicism, mannerism and primarily baroque illusionism. Figurative painting is, as it has been since the very beginning, a matter of cardinal destiny for Karel Balcar. He deals with it in a conscious and programmed manner. At first sight, the technical sovereignty with which the form of portrayal is handled here is arresting, however its concurrent secretiveness may be dissuading. In any case, its appeal is – in spite of the many shifts in opinion even in our constricted post-modern scene – exceptional all the same. What does this nonconformity reside in? A paradox, as if implicit within the process of originating itself, and of course also in the final form of his paintings. It seems nearly implausible that Karel Balcar himself belonged to a rare sort of talents in college, amongst whom the obstinate striving for personal release has stood far to the forefront ahead of the problems of technique itself. Such release then became the driving force in overcoming difficulty, which has simply capitulated to this will. Contentual and formal intransigence, led provocatively across temporal dimensions, may be the very fruit of such endeavour.

Today, Karel Balcar controls suitable means of painting to such a degree, that he is capable to manipulate them to suit his own unconventional imagination. He is able to elicit shreds of grim tales in his pictures, in which it seems like spirits of renewed tendencies of romanticism circumambulate, multiplied by accents of stylized aggression and salacious shadiness. At the same time he manages to eschew tawdry effects of fantasy or any feigning of the cryptic, which is particularly noteworthy – he need not deviate towards even a hint of banally empty symbolist stylization. The torsos of figures, often isolated in an ambiguous environment, become kinds of lone phantoms of reality themselves, chess figures in an unfinished match. It is likely for that very reason that we feel a distinct detachment, delineating this work as postmodernist rule. The practice, hermetic forms of real form create a barrier between the stage and the auditorium. The spectator is not allowed to join in. It is as if a legacy of classicism were at work here, of that tributary of European thought that has long been furthest from modern art in its objective. (from: Zdeněk Beran, abbreviated.)

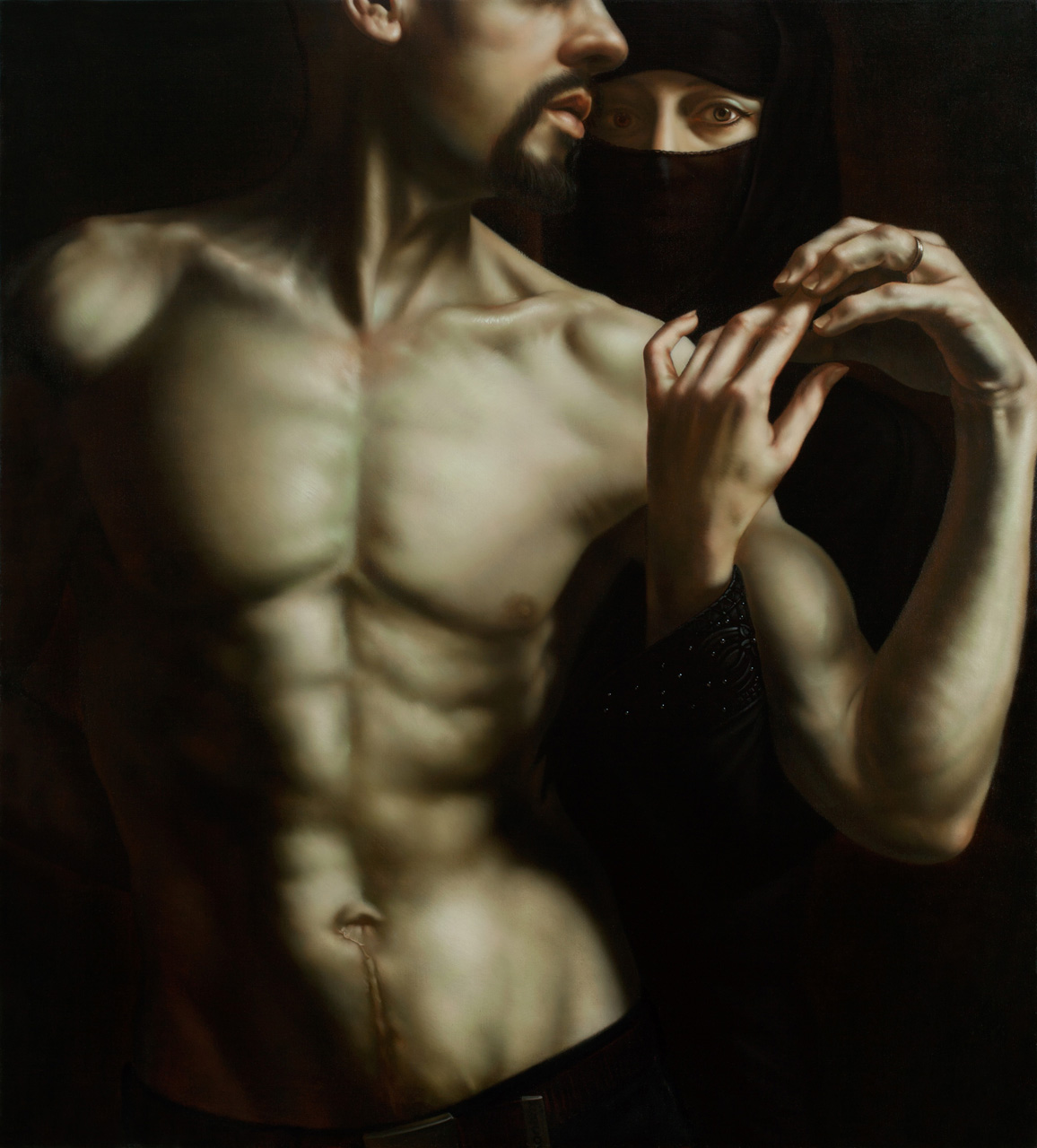
Recuerdos de la Alhambra (2015), oil on canvas, 132 x 128 cm

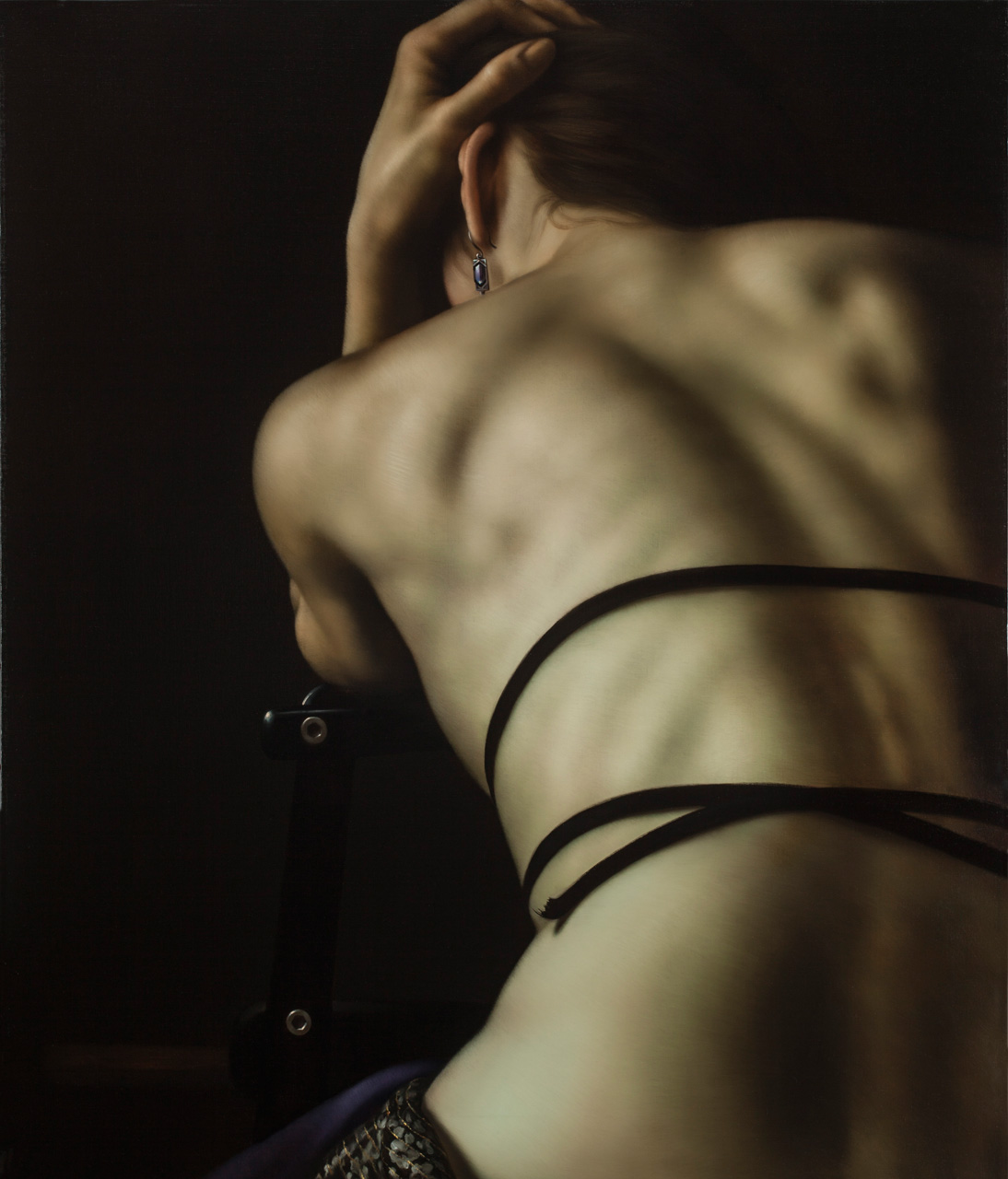
Sufficit unum (2016), oil on canvas, 132 x 107 cm

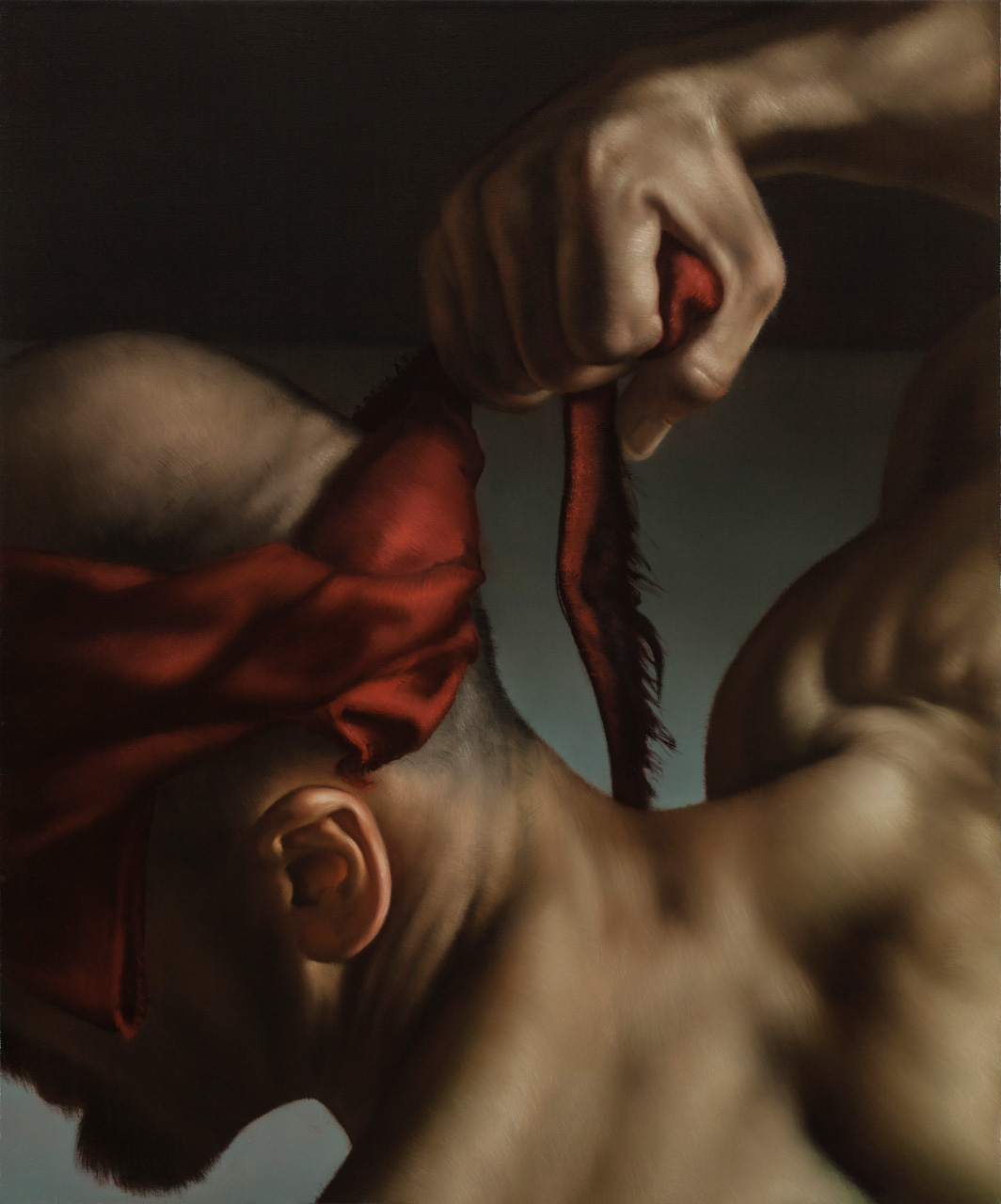
Self-tied II (2016), oil on canvas, 70 x 55 cm

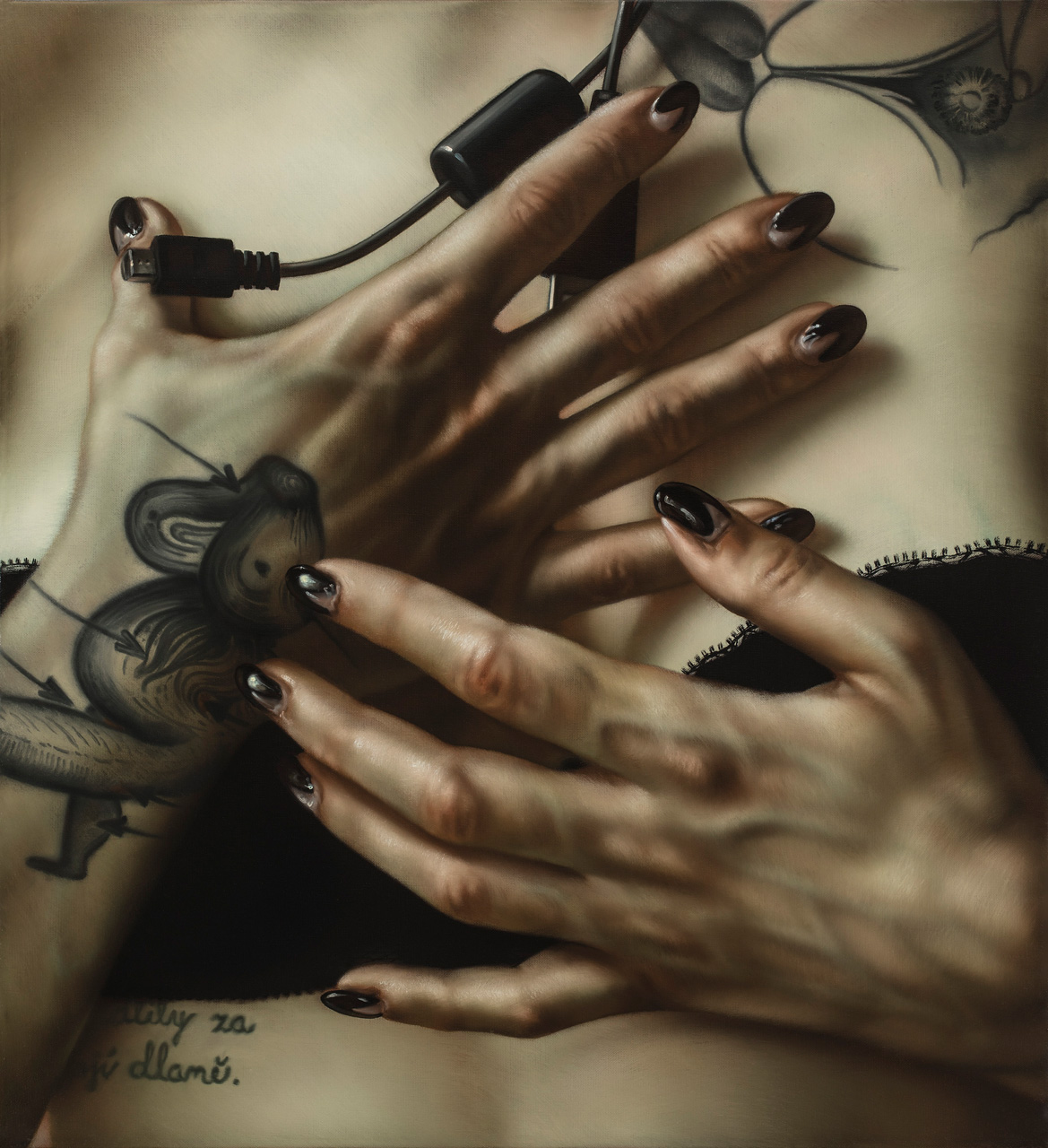
USB (2017), oil on canvas, 60 x 55 cm

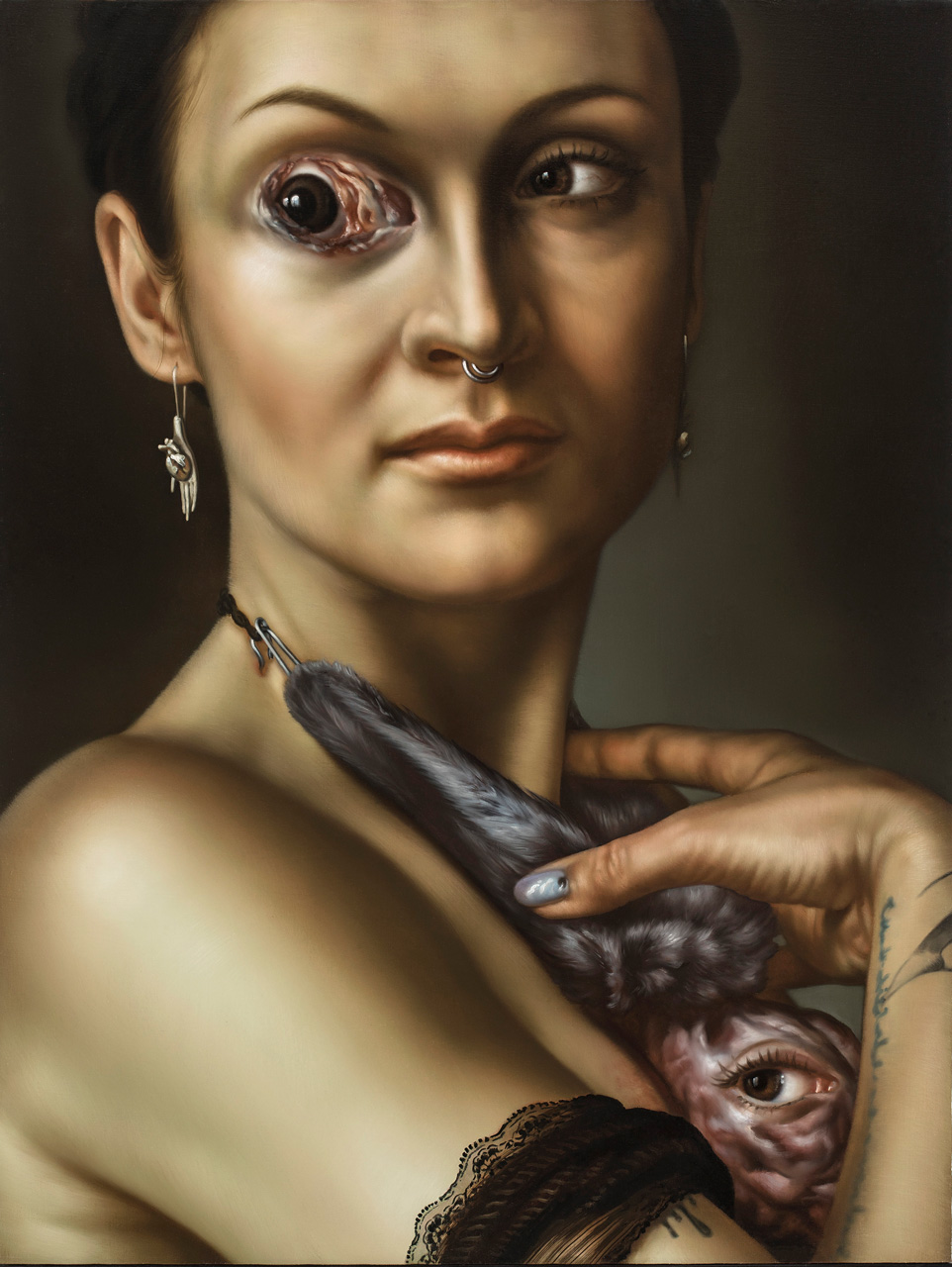
bunny (2017), oil on canvas, 93 x 72 cm

=== Solo exhibitions ===
- 1997 Smrt před očima / Death in eyes, Lichtenstein palace, Prague
- 2003 Autodafé, Fronta Gallery, Prague
- 2009 Man with The Finger, Czech center, Prague
- 2011 T2, Gallery of the Czech Insurance Co., Praha
- 2012 In progress..., Vltavín Gallery, Prague
- 2012 Untitled, Orlovna Gallery, Kroměříž
- 2016 Spending Eternity, Galerie Václava Špály Praha
