= Supreme Order of Christ =

Order of the Holy See

Supreme Order of Christ Ordine Supremo del Cristo
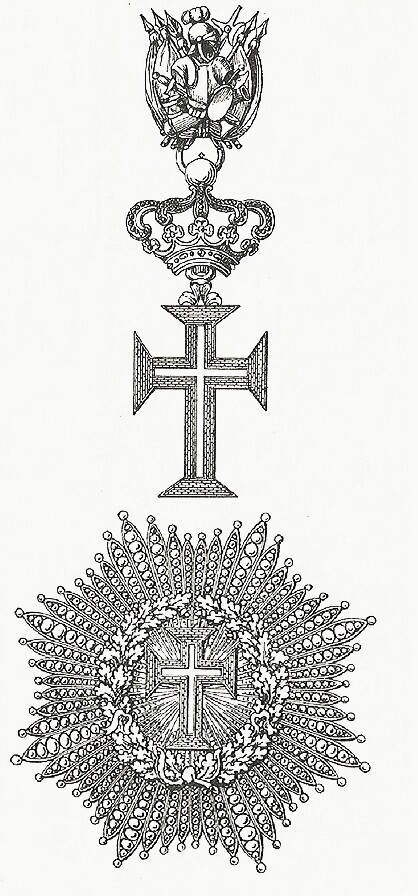
- Star and badge of the Order of Christ

Awarded by the Holy See
- Type: Papal order of knighthood
- Established: 1319
- Eligibility: Catholic heads of state
- Awarded for: Services to the Church
- Status: Dormant order
- Grand Master: Pope Leo XIV
- Grades: Knight

Precedence
- Next (higher): None (highest); clerics, such as theologians, philosophers, or diplomats, can be named Cardinals or Bishops for meritorious services to the Pope and the Holy See, without being given an actual office
- Next (lower): Order of the Golden Spur
- Ribbon bar of the order

The Supreme Order of Christ (Italian: Ordine Supremo del Cristo) is the highest order of chivalry that can be awarded by the Pope. No appointments have been made since 1987 and following the death in 1993 of the last remaining knight, King Baudouin of the Belgians, the order became dormant.

According to some scholars, it derives from the Order of Christ of the Knights Templar, like the Portuguese Military Order of Christ.

== Dispute ==
The papacy insisted that the right of the Portuguese monarchs to award the honour had been granted by a pope in the papal bull Ad ea ex quibus issued in Avignon on 14–15 March 1319. Although the bull itself does not explicitly grant to the Pope the right to grant membership in the order, successive popes since John XXII have done so.

For many years, the Portuguese monarchy disputed the right of the papacy to award the order, and in one famous case arrested Giovanni Niccolò Servandoni, an Italian architect, for wearing the papal order. The position of the Crown of Portugal was that the only legitimate fount of honour was the Crown. The official position of the Holy See is that the Pope is the head of every Catholic religious order and may appoint any individual he deems worthy at his own discretion and without the permission of the order's superior general.

== Senior papal order ==
As part of the general re-organisation of papal honours in 1905 by Pope Pius X, the papal Order of Christ was made the most senior papal honour. It was traditionally awarded to Catholic heads of state.

== Restriction ==
The usage of the order was restricted by Pope Paul VI in his 15 April 1966 Papal Bull Equestres Ordinis to Catholic heads of state to whom it might be given only to commemorate very special occasions at which the Pope himself was present. It has rarely been awarded since; the last award was made by Pope John Paul II on 3 July 1987 to Frà Angelo de Mojana, 77th prince and grand master of the Sovereign Military Order of Malta. With the death of King Baudouin of the Belgians on 31 July 1993, there are no living members of the Order of Christ.

In ecclesiastical heraldry, individuals awarded this order may depict a collar completely encircling the shield on their coat of arms.

== Notable members ==
- Konrad Adenauer
- Frederick Ferdinand, Duke of Anhalt-Köthen
- Prince Adolf of Auersperg
- Giovanni Baglione
- Baudouin of Belgium
- Ludwig von Benedek
- Francesco Borromini
- Nicholas Frederic Brady
- Charles III, Prince of Monaco
- Ludovico Chigi Albani della Rovere
- Marcantonio V Colonna
- René Coty
- Luigi Einaudi
- Archduke Eugen of Austria
- Prince Felix of Bourbon-Parma
- Archduke Franz Ferdinand of Austria
- Ferdinando Fuga
- Maximilian von Fürstenberg
- Charles de Gaulle
- Alejandro Groizard y Gómez de la Serna
- Prince Henry of Prussia (1862–1929)
- Heinrich von Heß
- Isabella II of Spain
- Konstantin of Hohenlohe-Schillingsfürst
- Giovanni Lanfranco
- Albert Lebrun
- Walter von Loë
- Claudio López, 2nd Marquess of Comillas
- Wilhelm Miklas
- Maximilian Karl Lamoral O'Donnell
- Francisco Franco
- Angelo de Mojana di Cologna
- George Robinson, 1st Marquess of Ripon
- Alessandro Ruspoli, 7th Prince of Cerveteri
- Antonio Segni
- Ferdinand van Spoelberch
- Massimo Stanzione
- Umberto II of Italy
- Antonio Aguilar y Correa, Marquis of Vega de Armijo
- Peter Anton von Verschaffelt
- Victor Emmanuel III of Italy
- Éamon de Valera
- Edmund Waterton
- Otto von Bismarck (The only Protestant to have received the award)

== See also ==
- Orders, decorations, and medals of the Holy See
- Order of Christ (Brazil)
- Order of Christ (Portugal)
- Order of Christ (Kongo)
