= Balthasar Moncornet =

French painter, engraver and tapissier (1600–1668)

- Born: 1600; Rouen
- Died: 1668; Paris

Balthasar Moncornet (1600, Rouen – 1668, Paris) was a French painter, engraver, and tapissier revered for his depictions of around 45 different prominent figures of the 17th century.

== Gallery of selected portraits ==
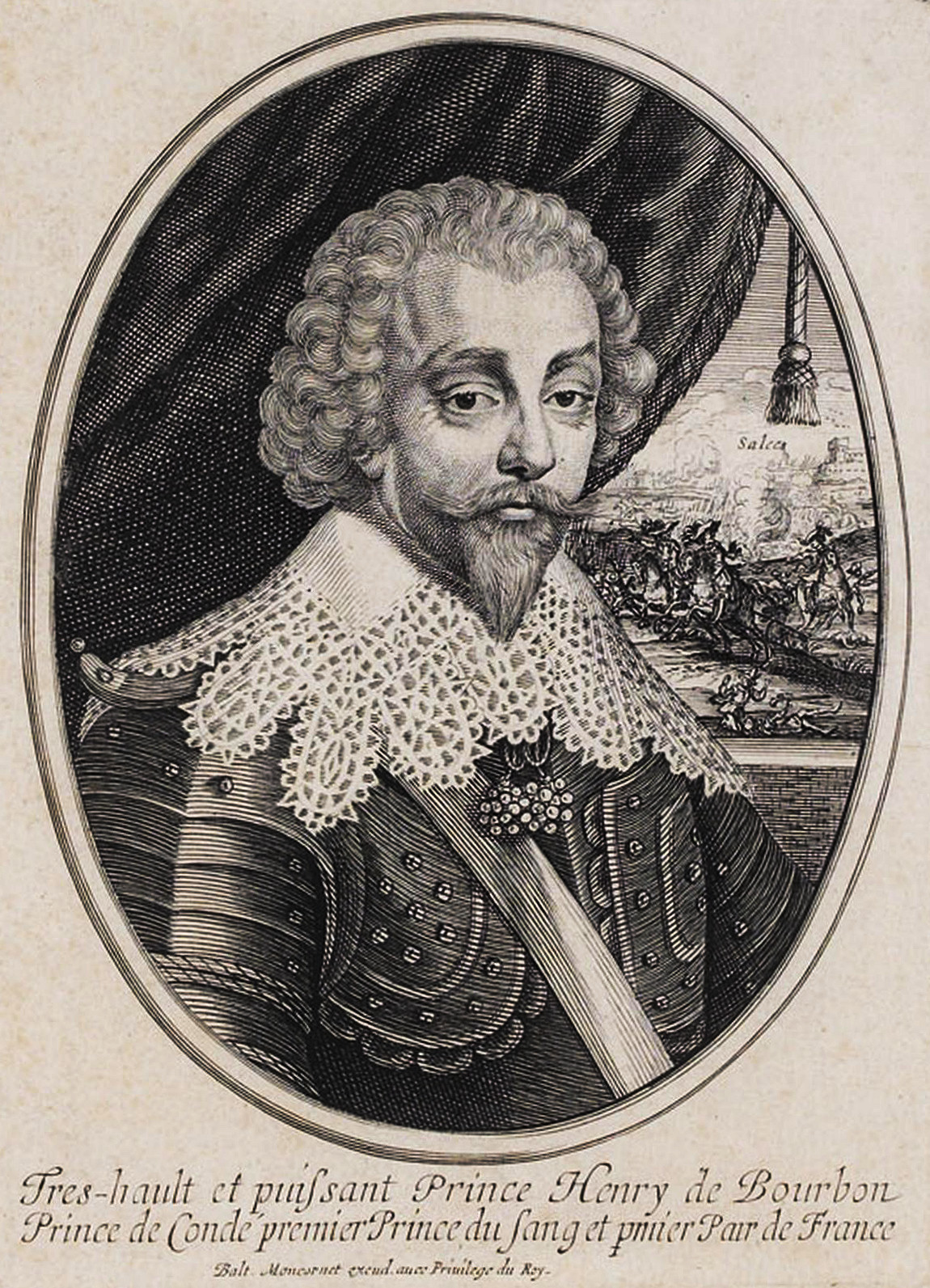

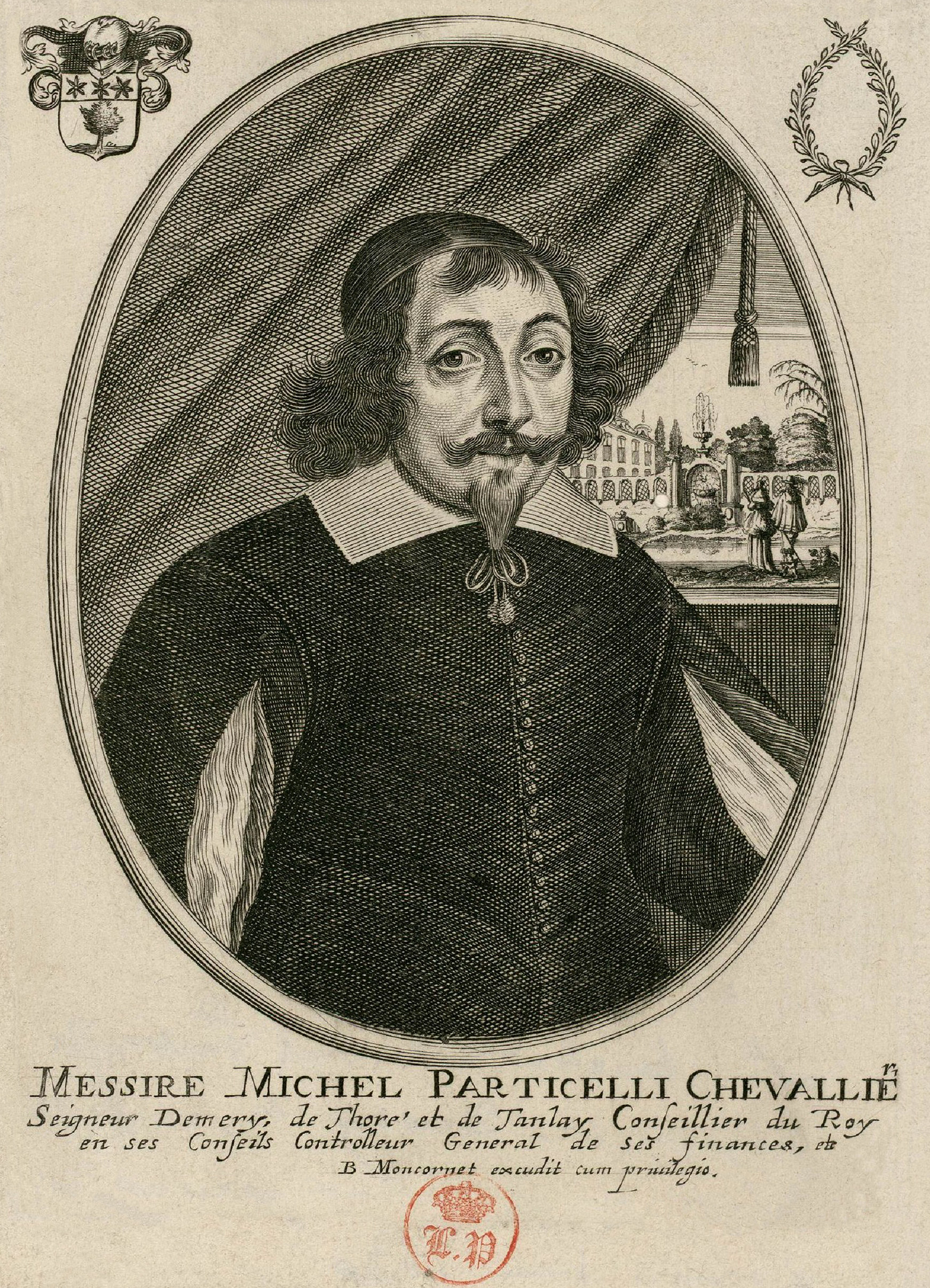

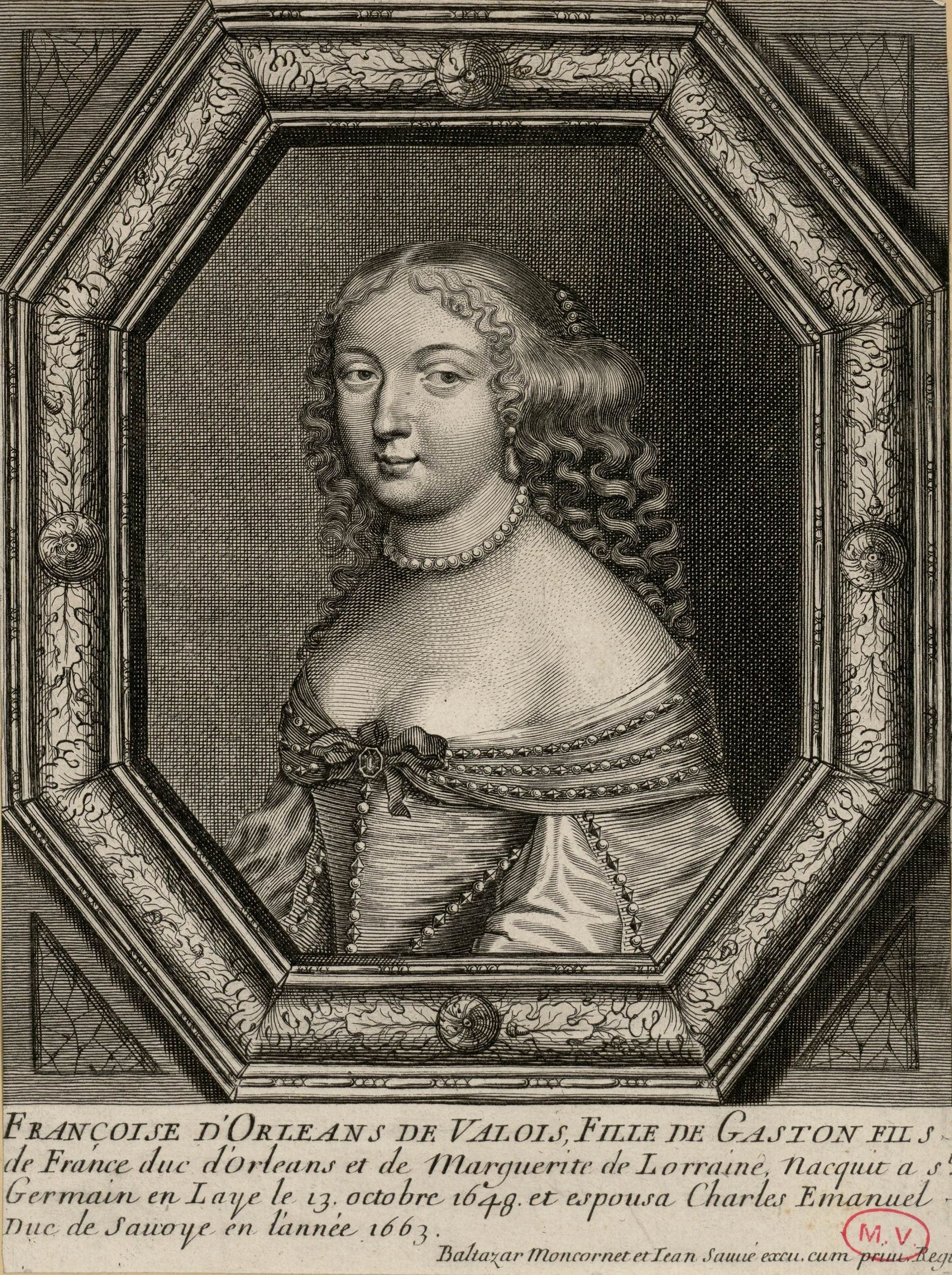

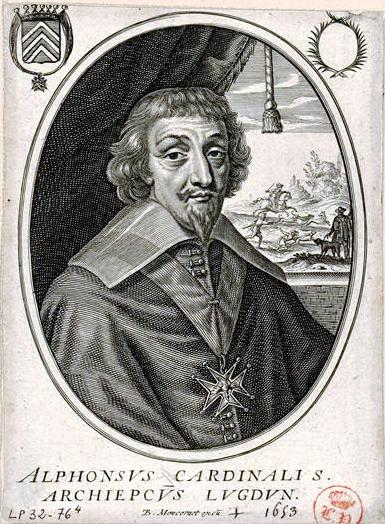

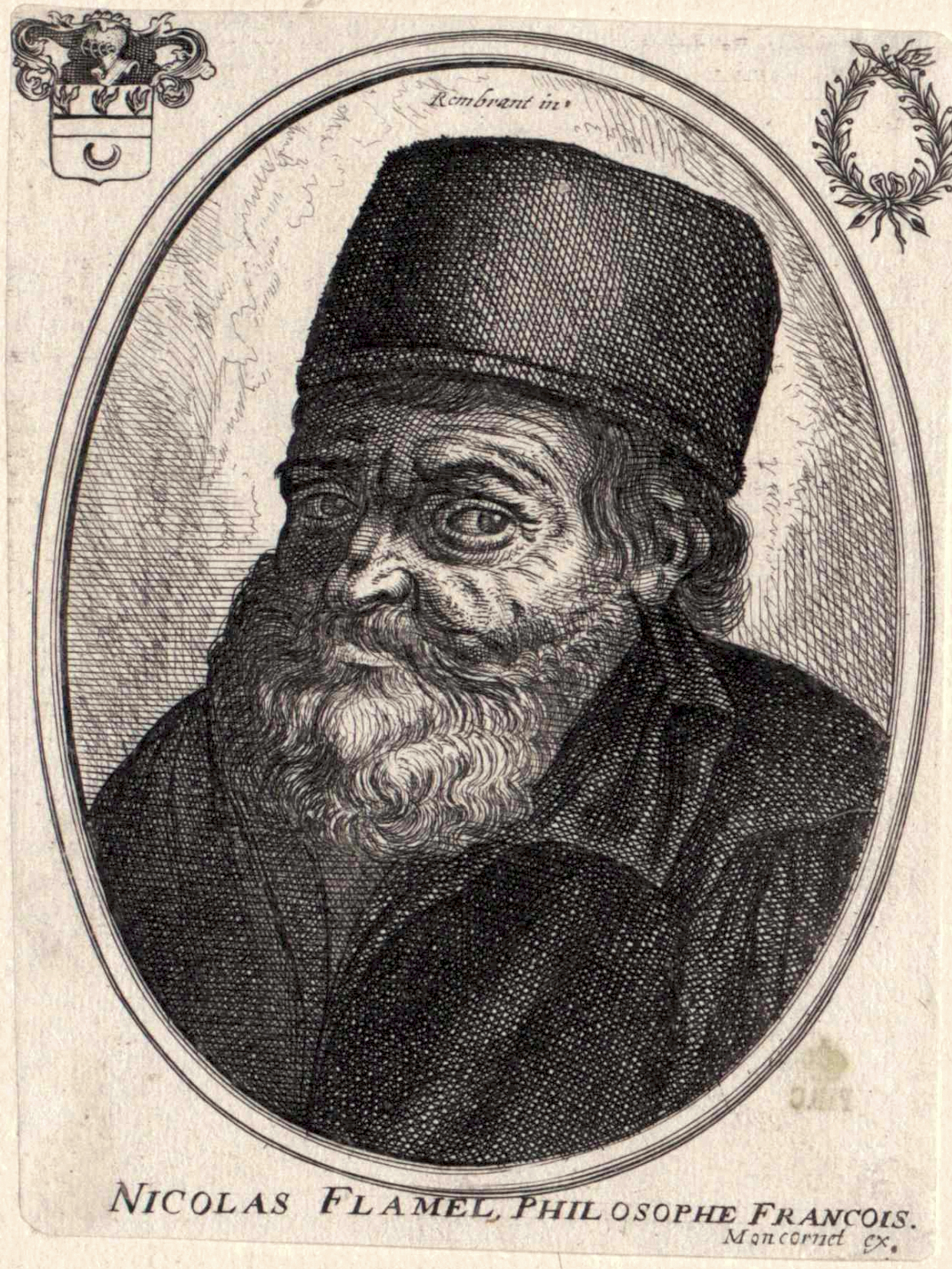

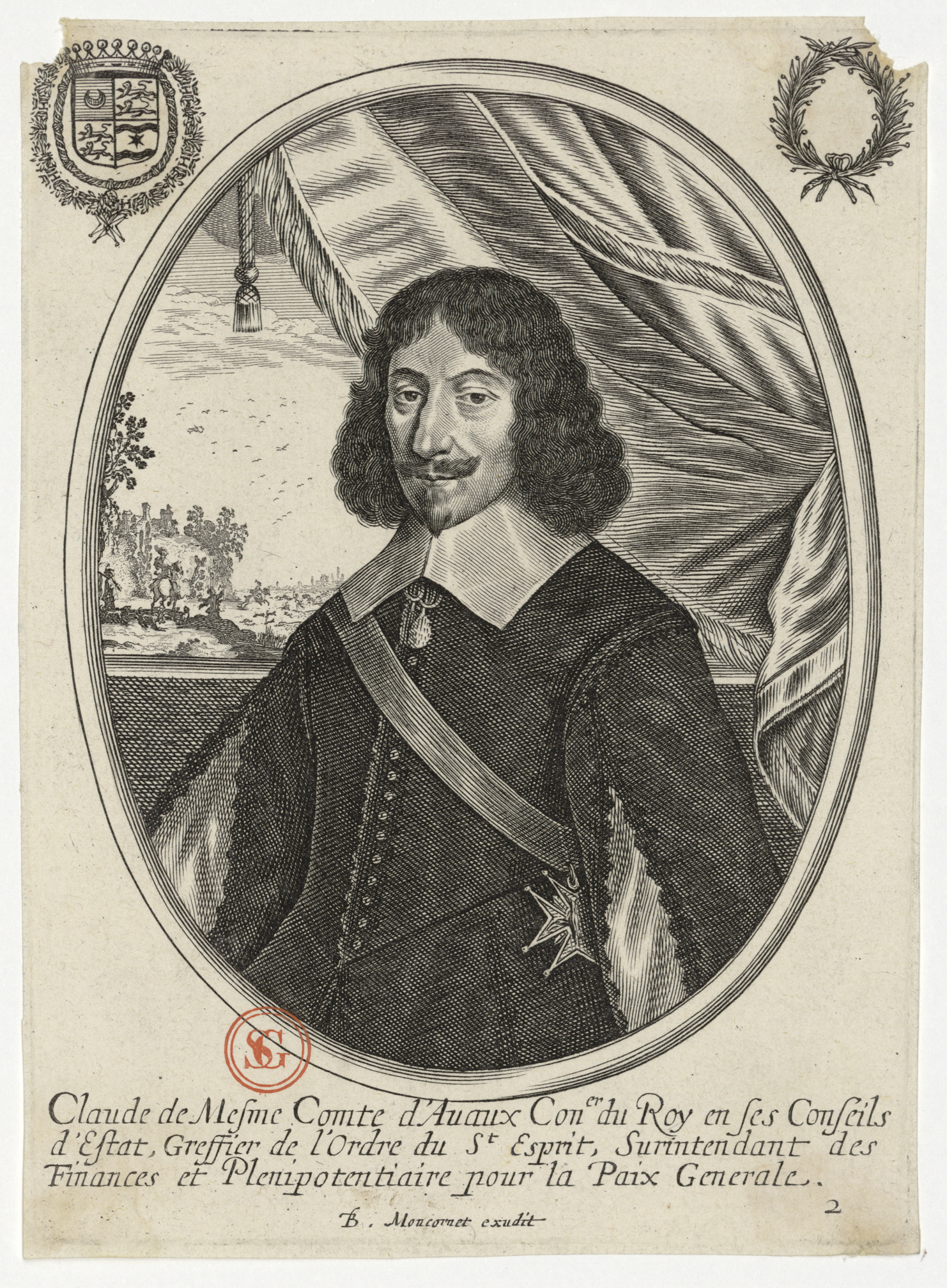

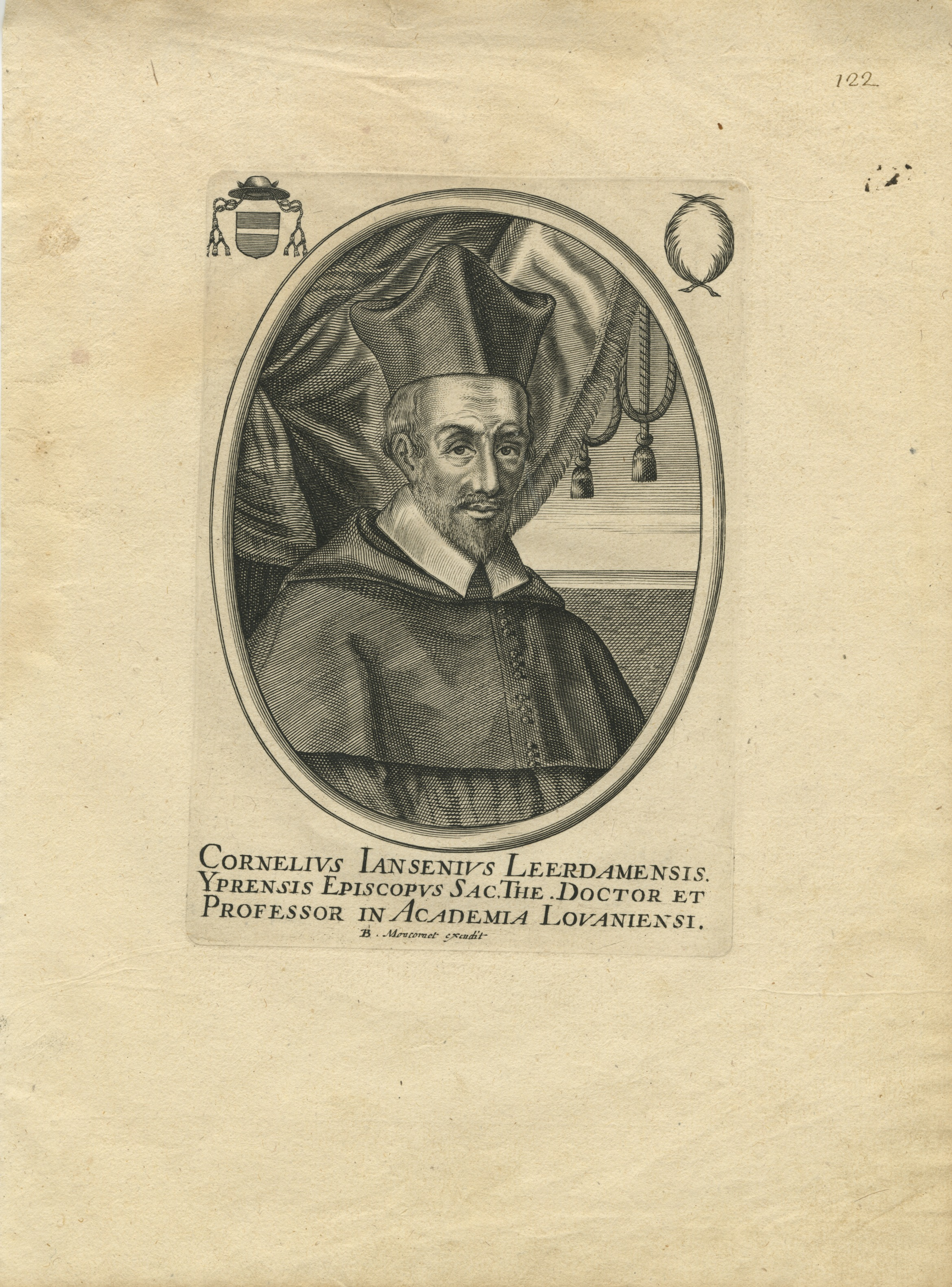

== Other works ==
- Le livre de toutes sortes de feuilles pour servir à l'art d'orfebvrerie. Paris, 1634.
  - The book of all kinds of leaves for use in goldsmith's art
- Livre nouveau de toutes sort of d'ouvrages d'orfevries. Paris, Jean Moncornet (c. 1670)
  - New book of all sorts of works of goldsmiths
- A Newes booklet by allhant Goldschimerrey picked up from all the best workers of this time. London, Bernard Quaritch, 1888, 12 engravings.
- Actual demolition of the place occupied earlier, and in place of Churpfaltz, place and fortress Mannheimb: as the same day in the beginning of the month Octobris Anno besieged in 1622 by Count von Tilli
- Actual depiction of the Electoral Principal of Heydelberg: How it was conquered by Lord Count von Thilli, (conquered by Her Duke Ferdinand Hertzog in Bayrn, supreme lieutenant), conquered by force...
- Plan de la ville de Rome, comme elle est apresent soubs regne du pape Clement IX, 1668
  - (Map) Plan of the city of Rome, as it is now under the reign of Pope Clement IX, 1668
