= Wespelaar =

Coordinates: 50.960°N 4.631°E

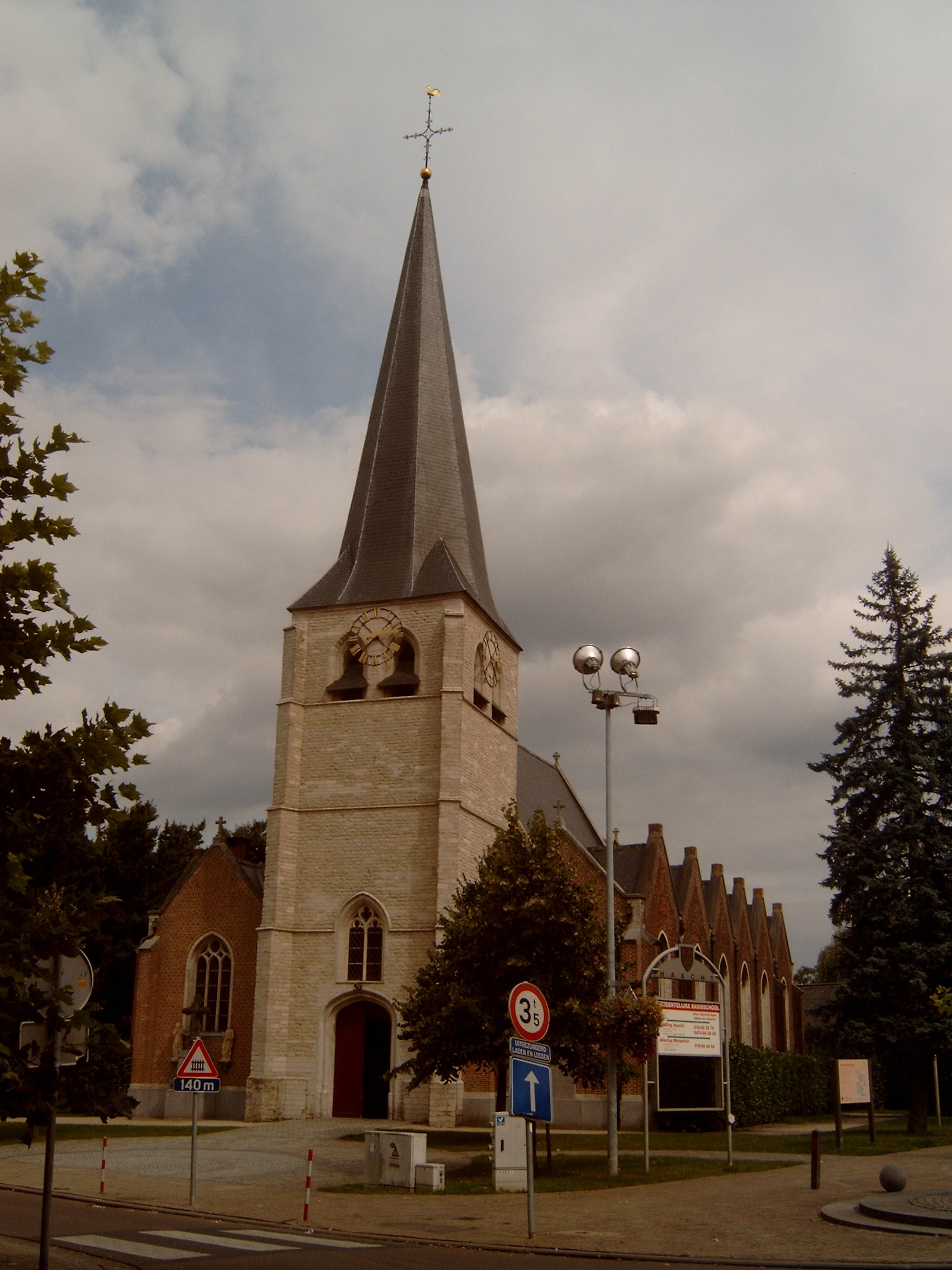
Church of Saint Lucy in Wespelaar

Wespelaar is a borough of the municipality of Haacht, located between Kampenhout - Tildonk and Haacht center, in the Flemish Region in the province of Flemish Brabant, Belgium.

It was a municipality in its own right before the merger of the municipalities in 1977.

During the German invasion of Belgium (1914), the Belgian army attacked German positions in September 1914. This battle of Wespelaar is still remembered today with a yearly ceremony.
