= Balthasar van Lemens =

Flemish painter

- Born: 1637; Antwerp
- Died: 1704 (aged 66–67); Westminster
- Occupation: Painter

Balthasar van Lemens (1637–1704) was a Flemish painter.

== Biography ==
Van Lemens was born at Antwerp in 1637, came over to England, and had some slight success in painting small pieces of history. Meeting, however, with misfortunes, he was reduced to working for other people, drawing and making sketches to assist the work of both painters and engravers. Among the latter he was chiefly employed by Paul van Somer II, the mezzotint-engraver. He also copied portraits by Van Dyck and others. He had a brother who practised in Brussels, and painted Balthasar's portrait. Van Lemens died in Westminster in 1704.

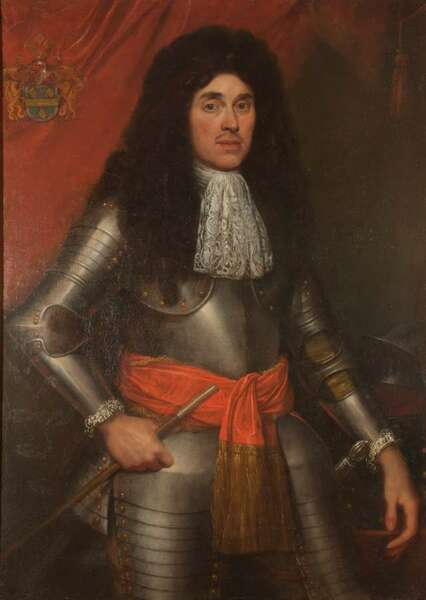
Portrait of Christoffel van Spoelberch (1633-1707), mayor of Leuven and member of the noble Spoelberch family, by Balthasar van Lemens in 1689
