= Sagan Planet Walk =

Solar System scale model

Coordinates: 42.4396966°N 76.498887°W

Map of the Planet Walk

The Sciencenter's Sagan Planet Walk is a walkable scale model of the Solar System, located in Ithaca, New York. The model scales the entire Solar System—both planet size and distances between them—down to one five billionth of its actual size. The exhibition was originally created in 1997 in memory of Ithaca resident and Cornell Professor Carl Sagan.

Consisting of eleven obelisks situated along a 1.18 km (0.73 mi) path through the streets of downtown Ithaca, the original Planet Walk leads from the Sun at Center Ithaca to Pluto at the Ithaca Sciencenter. In 2012, the model was expanded 7,630 kilometers (4,740 mi) to include a representation of Alpha Centauri, the Sun's closest neighboring star, at the ʻImiloa Astronomy Center in the University of Hawaiʻi at Hilo. The addition of the Alpha Centauri Obelisk made it the world's largest exhibition, until the Akaa Solar System Scale Model added Proxima Centauri in 2018 at a distance of 13,370 kilometres (8,310 mi) away from Akaa.

In 2014, the inner planets and Sun were removed as part of extensive construction being done to the Ithaca Commons, but have since been replaced. In 2015, a grant was approved to further expand the exhibition by installing an exoplanet Kepler-37d station on the Moon 384,500 kilometers (238,900 mi) away.

== Individual models ==
The scaled size of the Sun is given by a 27.8 cm (10.9 in) diameter circular frame repeated at the top of each 6 ft (1.8 m) tall obelisk. Centered within each sun-sized frame, the proportional size of each planet is represented by a small sphere affixed in a glass window. All of the original planet locations were chosen not only for accuracy to scale but also to highlight local landmarks and public spaces within Ithaca. However, since the original installation of the Planet Walk the public library has moved to a new location, leaving Saturn no longer attached to a local landmark. Additionally, as of 2016-2017, the original planets in plexiglass at each station have been replaced by simple yellow disks with the planet simply represented by a relatively-sized hole. Some attendant moons are now represented by tiny holes in the disks.

=== The Sun ===
The Sun Obelisk is located in the center of the Ithaca Commons, a pedestrian shopping area in the heart of downtown Ithaca. The round window representing the size of the Sun at this station is roughly the size of a basketball and, in this obelisk only, contains no glass. All the subsequent obelisks in the Solar System model have Sun-sized glass windows containing their respective planets for the sake of comparison.

=== The inner planets ===
The obelisks for the four inner planets are all contained within the commons area stretching north towards Seneca Street. Mercury is situated to scale about 12.7 yards (11.6 meters) away from the Sun, Venus another 10 yards (9.1 meters) away, Earth another 9.3 yards (8.5 meters) away, and Mars another 17.1 yards (15.6 meters) away. This keeps the four inner planets within eyesight of the Sun, yet the representations of each planet appear quite small within their glass windows, and can even be somewhat hard to see. The contrast between the size of the Sun and the size of the inner planets coupled with the visible distance between them illustrate the vastness and emptiness of space.

=== The asteroid belt ===
Once leaving the inner planets, a visitor to the Planet Walk turns west along Seneca Street to continue towards Jupiter. Between Mars and Jupiter lies the asteroid belt. The obelisk representing the asteroid belt was added several years after the initial installation. Its display contains the only public, unguarded meteorite in the world.

=== Jupiter ===
The Jupiter Obelisk sits at the corner of Seneca Street and Cayuga Street, outside the downtown Dewitt Mall, and not far from the famed Moosewood Restaurant. The model of Jupiter within the glass window is the first planet representation on the walk that is easily visible, demonstrating how much bigger than the inner planets it is.

=== Saturn ===
To reach the Saturn Obelisk, visitors turn north and continue along Cayuga Street. At the corner of Cayuga Street and Court Street, Saturn's obelisk sits outside the former location of the Tompkins County Public Library. The rings of Saturn are clearly visible within the circular window.

=== Uranus ===
Visitors continue northward along Cayuga Street from Saturn, reaching the Uranus Obelisk just across Cascadilla Creek at the entrance to Thompson Park.

=== Neptune and the Carl Sagan Bridge ===
The Carl Sagan Bridge with planet symbols

From Uranus, visitors follow Willow Avenue northwest and cross the Carl Sagan Bridge at Adams Street to reach the Neptune Obelisk. The Carl Sagan Bridge, built in 2000, features nine circular windows adorned with the signs of the nine planets. The obelisk for Neptune is located just across the bridge in Conley Park.

=== Pluto and the Sciencenter ===
The Planet Walk was conceived and built prior to Pluto losing its planetary status in 2006, and the model includes the Pluto Obelisk, which is located just outside the Sciencenter on First Street.

=== Alpha Centauri ===
The model was expanded 7,630 kilometers (4,740 mi) in 2012 to include Alpha Centauri, the star system closest to the Sun. The Alpha Centauri Obelisk is exhibited at the ʻImiloa Astronomy Center in the University of Hawaiʻi at Hilo in Hilo, Hawaii. The volcanic stone Hawaiian figure representing Alpha Centauri in female form has a 280 millimetres (11 in) semicircle under its chin to represent its scale size. This extension made the Sagan Planet Walk the world's largest exhibition.

== Bill Nye ==
Television host and former student of Carl Sagan, Bill Nye, narrated a podcast tour of the Planet Walk in 2006 which can be accessed free by calling 703-637-6237 as you walk through the scale-model representation of the Solar System.

== Table of scaled sizes and distances ==
Table of Scaled Sizes and Distances
| Body | Actual Diameter (km) | Scaled Diameter (mm) | Actual Distance from Sun (km) | Scaled Distance (m) |
|---|---|---|---|---|
| Sun | 1,391,000 | 278.2 | 0 | 0.00 |
| Mercury | 4,880 | 1.0 | 57,910,000 | 11.58 |
| Venus | 12,104 | 2.4 | 108,200,000 | 21.64 |
| Earth | 12,756 | 2.6 | 149,600,000 | 29.92 |
| Mars | 6,794 | 1.4 | 227,940,000 | 45.59 |
| Jupiter | 142,984 | 28.6 | 778,330,000 | 155.67 |
| Saturn | 120,536 | 24.1 | 1,429,400,000 | 285.88 |
| Uranus | 51,118 | 10.2 | 2,870,990,000 | 574.20 |
| Neptune | 49,532 | 9.9 | 4,504,000,000 | 900.80 |
| Pluto | 2,274 | 0.5 | 5,913,520,000 | 1,182.70 |
| Alpha Centauri | 1,702,000 (A) 1,201,000 (B) | 280.0 | 41,300,000,000,000 | 7,630,000.00 |
| Kepler-37d (proposed) | 25,400 | 5.1 | 1,976,000,000,000,000 | 400,000,000.00 |

== History and timetable of expansions ==
- 1997 Original Planet Walk created in Ithaca, with ten obelisks for the Sun and nine planets
- 2000 Carl Sagan Bridge built across Cascadilla Creek on the way to the Neptune Obelisk
- 2006 Audio Tour narrated by Bill Nye added
- 2009 Asteroid Belt Obelisk added between the inner and outer planets
- 2009 Newly designed Passport to the Solar System
- 2012 Station depicting Alpha Centauri erected in Hawaii
- Kepler-37d station to be installed on Moon (installation date TBD)

== Models inspired by the Sagan Planet Walk ==
The Sagan Planet Walk has inspired the creation of other scale-model Solar Systems in the United States.

- The Delmar Loop Planet Walk in St. Louis, Missouri:

"In 2006, I became aware of the Sagan Planet Walk in Ithaca, NY, and as an amateur astronomy buff, I found the idea of a scale model solar system to be a fascinating concept. While researching other such models on the Internet, I developed the idea to build one in St. Louis."—Stephen Walker

- The Anchorage Light Speed Planet Walk in Alaska:

"The idea for this project was ignited by [Eli Menaker's] visit to the Carl Sagan Memorial Planet Walk in Ithaca, New York."

== See also ==
- Solar System model
