= Kirkhill Astronomical Pillar =

Solar System model near Broxburn, Scotland

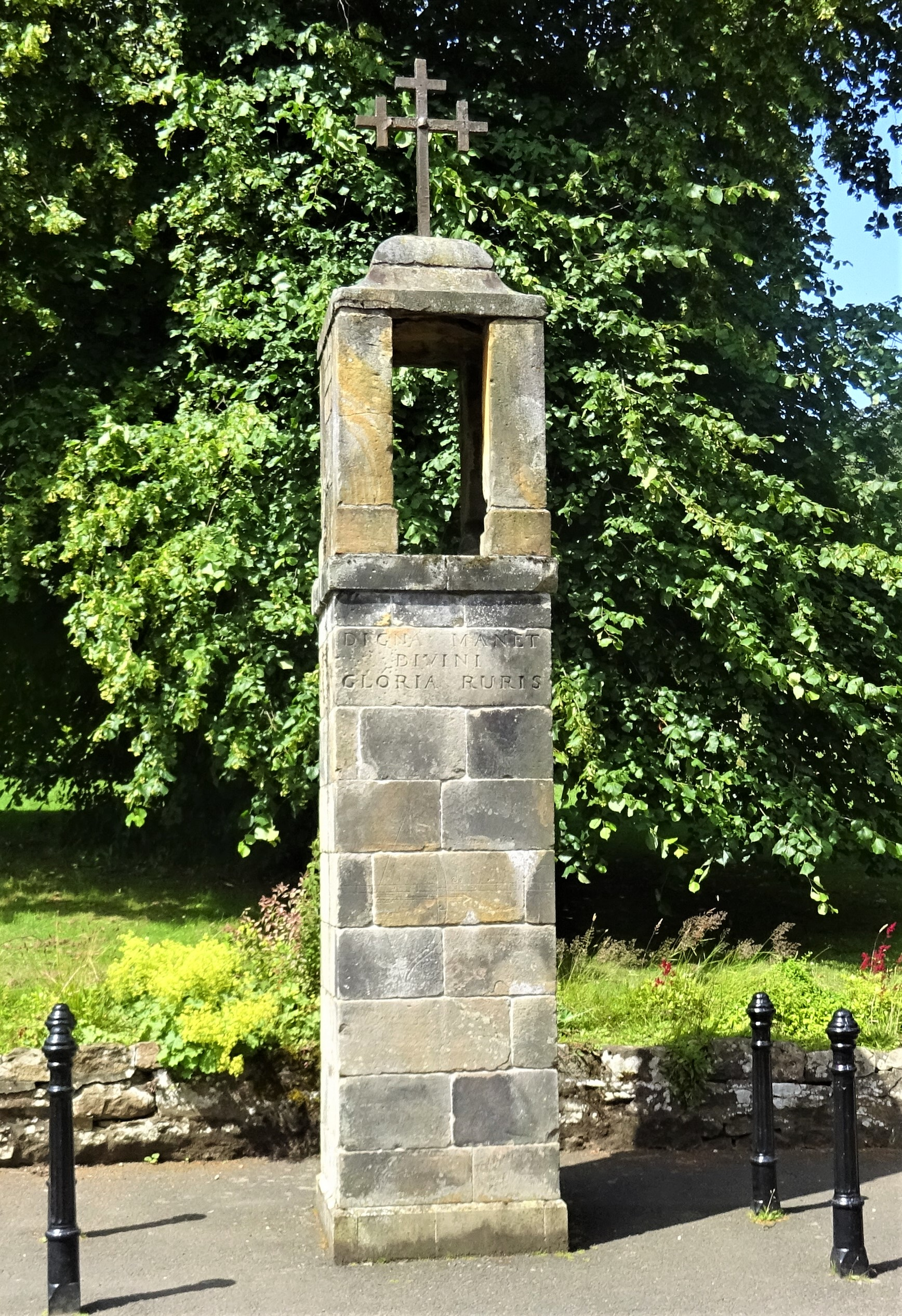
The pillar

The Kirkhill Astronomical Pillar was constructed in 1776 by David Stewart Erskine, 11th Earl of Buchan (Note: Erskine's second given name is spelled either Stewart or Steuart. The latter, a French version originating in the time of Mary, Queen of Scots, was that adopted by his mother's father (James Steuart). See also Encyclopaedia Britannica (2020).) and erected in the grounds of his estate at Kirkhill House, near Broxburn, Scotland. The pillar fell into disrepair and eventually collapsed in the 1970s but fortunately the stones were preserved and the pillar was reconstructed (1988) in Almondell Country Park on land once owned by the Erskine family. (Note: The present location of the pillar is about 2.5 miles from Kirkhill House, close to the location of the home built by his younger brother Henry Erskine.) The pillar records the details of an adjacent scale model of the Solar System constructed by Erskine following the measurements of the size of the Solar System deduced from the observations of the Transits of Venus in 1761 and 1769. The model, centred on a Sun of stone six feet in diameter with planets at distances and sizes to scale, has long since disappeared; only the pillar remains.

== Erskine and science ==
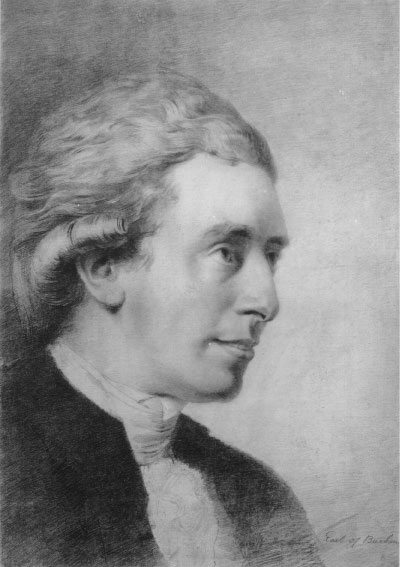
David Erskine, the 11th Earl of Buchan

As a young child Erskine was taught at home by his parents, both of whom had studied (and met each other) in the classes of the famous mathematician Colin Maclaurin at Edinburgh University. They also employed a private tutor, James Buchanan, a graduate of Glasgow university, well versed in mathematics and languages. Under the guidance of this trio he developed a life interest in mathematics and astronomy.

At the age of 13, Erskine entered St. Andrews University (1755–1759) and then continued to Edinburgh University (1760–1762) and finally Glasgow University (1762–63). Although Erskine's later intellectual activities were dominated by his investigation of Scottish antiquities, he remained interested in science and mathematics. He was honoured by election to the Royal Society of London in 1765. (Note: List of fellows of the Royal Society D, E, F) At that time he was living in London and at meetings of the society he would have heard much of the following topical astronomical problem.

== How far is the Sun? ==
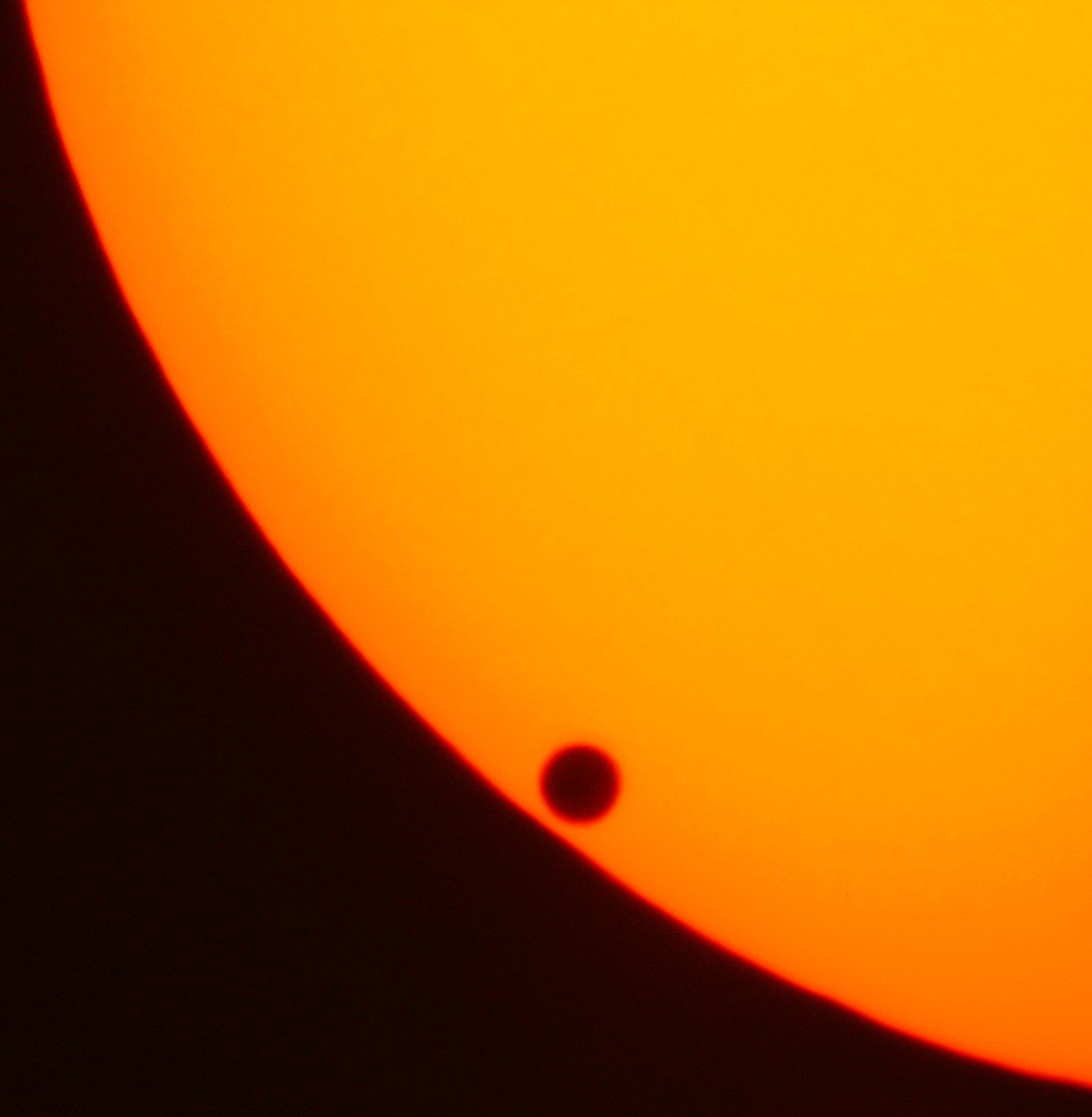
Venus in transit over the face of the Sun

By the beginning of the eighteenth century the Copernican model of a heliocentric Solar System was well established and astronomers such as Tycho Brahe and Johannes Kepler were able to describe the motions of the planets with ever greater precision. However, no one knew the absolute size in miles (or any other units) of the Solar System although the solar distances of the planets could all be expressed as definite ratios of the Earth-Sun distance by using Kepler's laws. This fundamental distance is termed the Astronomical Unit (AU). (Note: In the 18th and 19th centuries astronomers did not refer to the astronomical unit, instead they referred to the solar parallax, the angle subtended by the known radius of the Earth at the distance of the Sun. The definitions are equivalent.)

The breakthrough came in 1639 when Jeremiah Horrocks made the first scientific observation of a transit of Venus and used his results to estimate an approximation for the AU. A second method, proposed in 1663 by the Scottish mathematician James Gregory, was promoted by Edmond Halley in a paper published in 1691 (revised 1716). He demonstrated how the AU could be measured very accurately by comparing the duration of the Venus transit across the face of the Sun as measured by two observers spaced at latitudes a few thousand kilometres apart. (Note: Halley's method, as described in his 1716 paper, is fairly inscrutable for modern readers with one simple figure and no equations in sight. The method is of historic interest only. Simplified modern discussions are Odenwald (2012) are Odenwald and DePontieu (2012) Nowadays the scale of the Solar System is measured by radar ranging to Venus and inter-planetary space probes.)

The next opportunities of observing such a transit were in 1761 and 1769 but Halley had died in 1742 and it was left to others to organise observations in the first ever major international scientific collaboration. The event of 1761 produced sparse results because travel overseas was greatly hindered by the Seven Years' War but in 1769 many observers were again despatched all over the world, amongst them being Captain James Cook on behalf of the Royal Society of London. Various pairs of observation results were input into Halley's calculations giving many slightly different values and a mean value of the AU was published shortly afterwards in the Philosophical Transactions of the Royal Society. The result was 93,726,900 miles, within one per cent of the presently accepted value is 92,955,807 miles.

In Scotland, both transits were observed by Erskine's friend and neighbour, Reverend Alexander Bryce, (Note: Bryce, described as an eminent geometrician in the Dictionary of Eminent Scotsmen (BDES (1857)), and as an applied mathematician in the Oxford Dictionary of National Biography (ODNB Bryce (2004)), continued with his mathematical studies and for a while took over the lectures of Maclaurin during the latter's closing illness.) minister of the church at Kirknewton, only 3 miles from Kirkhill. Bryce was a competent mathematician and he calculated (Note: It is not known which distant observation was used by Bryce in his calculation of the AU.) the AU and the other distance parameters of the Solar System: it is these values that Erskine used to create his scale model of the Solar System.

== The epitome ==
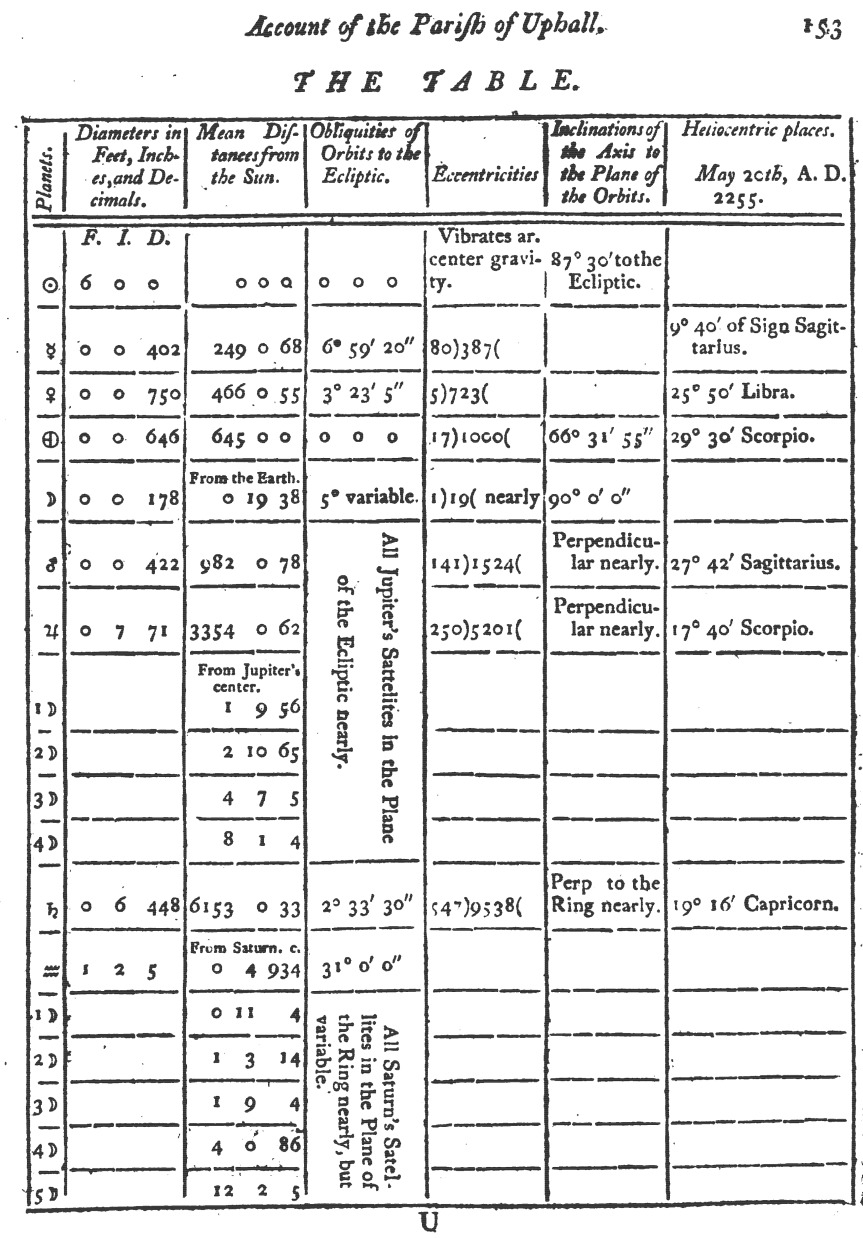
The table as printed in the Uphall account.

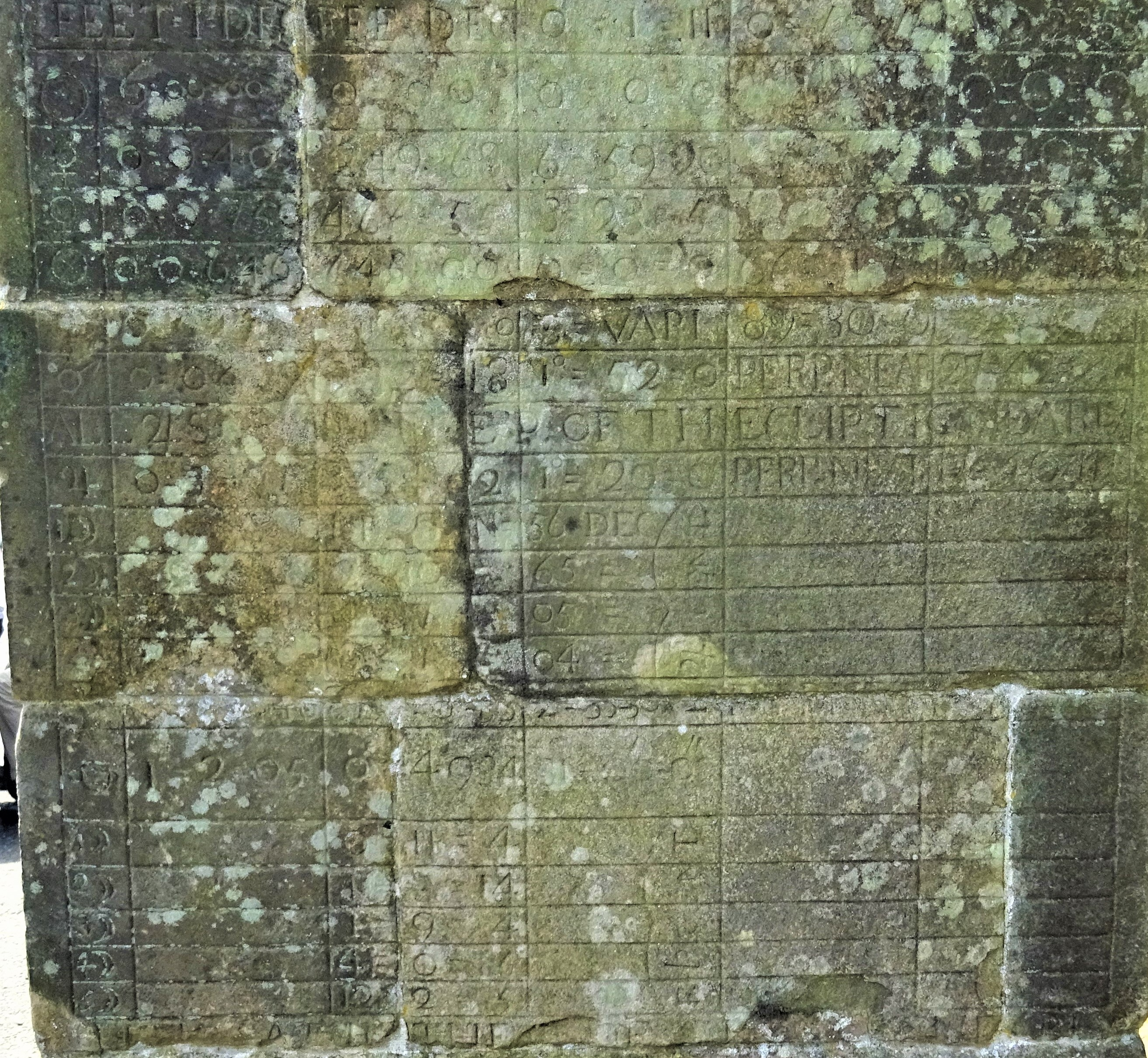
A portion of the badly eroded table inscribed on the pillar

In his 'Account of the Parish of Uphall', Erskine writes:

"In the year 1776, I caused a representation to be made of the solar system, on a scale of 12,283 miles and 28/100 to an inch; the table of which epitome (Note: Erskine is using the word 'epitome' in the sense of a summary of knowledge but he would have been aware that Kepler's Epitome Astronomiae Copernicanae was the standard astronomy text book for the seventeenth century.) is engraved on a belfray which stands in the middle of my garden, and of which I shall insert a transcript below."

The scale appears unusual but it followed simply from Bryce's calculation of the diameter of the Sun as 884,396 miles and Erskine's arbitrary choice of a representation of the Sun by a freestone spheroid 6 feet, or 72 inches, in diameter. Dividing 884,396 by 72 gives 12,283.28 miles to one inch, or 778,268,621:1. Of the six planets known in the eighteenth century Jupiter and Saturn were modelled in stone, the latter having an iron band, and the smaller planets were made of bronze: all were mounted on plinths or pillars in the grounds of the Kirkhill estate at the correct scaled distance from the Sun. Primrose, writing in 1898, says that only a few of the plinths remained in his day.

The table giving the dimensions of his representation is carved into the east face of the stone pillar, or belfry; it is barely legible now, but the details are preserved in the Uphall account. Planet diameters and distances on the pillar are reproduced here, along with the values obtained by scaling inches up to miles, by a factor of 12,283.28. Modern values are shown for comparison. Details for the moons of Jupiter and Saturn have been omitted. (Note: The pillar lists all the moons that were known at the time, and which had yet to be named. They are our own moon, Jupiter's Galilean moons, and Saturn's Tethys, Dione, Rhea, Titan, and Iapetus.)

		Diameter			Mean distance		
		model^{1}(in)	scaled^{2}(mi)	actual^{3}(mi)	model^{1}(ft)	scaled^{2}(mi)	actual^{3} (mi)
☉	Sun	72	D=884,396	864337	--	--	--
☿	Mercury	0.402	4938	3032	249.06	36,711,285	36,000,000
♀	Venus	0.750	9212	7521	466.05	68,695,472	67,200,000
🝴^{5}	Earth	0.646	7935	7926	645.0	AU=95,072,587	93,000,000
☽	Moon	0.178	2186	2159	1.615^{4}	238,050 ^{4}	239,000^{4}
♂	Mars	0.422	5184	4221	982.06	144,755,752	141,600,000
♃	Jupiter	7.710	94704	88846	3354.05	494,384,823	438,800,000
♄	Saturn	6.448	79203	74897	6153.03	906,952,684	890,400,000
^{6}	Rings	14.50	c.178108	170,000^{7}	0.41	60,434	57,200^{7}
1 Feet(F), Inches(I), decimal(D) part of inches converted to decimal inches/feet for diameters/distances. 2 Scaled figures in miles by multiplying inches by 12283.23 and feet by 12*12283.23; 3 Average present day values are taken from NASA factsheets for planets and Sun. 4 Moon distance is from Earth. Moons of Jupiter and Saturn omitted from this table. 5 Replaced in Uphall's table with the quadrants of the Earth symbol,. 6 Replaced in Uphall's table with the symbol for Aquarius,. 7 Typical data for the width and inner radius of the Rings of Saturn.

Calculation of the values in the table starts from the new value of the AU calculated by Bryce. Kepler's Laws then give the solar distance (in miles) for every planet and therefore, given the actual dimensions of the orbits, it is straightforward to calculate the distance of any planet from Earth at the time of any observation. Then, using the observed angular sizes of the Sun and the planets he could deduce their diameters in miles.

To fit the data on the table Bryce must have calculated the value for the AU to be 95,072,587 miles. This value is greater than the modern (average) value of 93,000,000 miles. This largely accounts for the discrepancies in Erskine's data for distances and diameters.

The third, fourth and fifth columns of the pillar are reproduced in a second table below. It shows that the eccentricities of the planets and their inclinations to the ecliptic were quite well known at the time. (In the table Erskine's eccentricity value 80)387( is simply the fraction 80/387 and this has been replaced by decimal 0.207 etc.). Eccentricity and inclination are the essential parameters for working out the motions of the planets. No values are given for the orbit inclinations to the ecliptic for Mars and Jupiter, the space on the table having been utilised for a comment on the moons of Jupiter. The last pair of columns refer to what Erskine terms the inclination; the planet rotation axis to the plane of the orbit. Nowadays the term axial tilt is used by astronomers: it defines the angle between the rotation axis and the normal to the plane of the orbit and it is equal to 90 degrees minus Erskine's inclination. The values for Mercury and Venus are omitted on the pillar.

		Obliquity^{1}		Eccentricity		Inclination^{2}	
		pillar	actual	pillar	actual	pillar	90°− tilt
☿	Mercury	6°59′20″	7° 00′	0.21	0.2	--	0°2′
♀	Venus	3°23′05″	3°24′	0.007	0.007	--	2°36′
🝴	Earth	0°	0°	0.017	0.017	66° 32′	66°36′
☽	Moon	5°	5°06′	0.053	0.055	90°	83°18′
♂	Mars	--	1°54′	0.093	0.094	≈90°	64°48′
♃	Jupiter	--	1°18′	0.048	0.049	≈90°	86°54′
♄	Saturn	2°33′30″	2°30′	0.057	0.057	≈90°	63°18′
🪐︎	Rings	2°33′	31°0′^{3}	--	--	--	--
1 Erskine's 'obliquity' now termed Orbital inclination 2 Erskine's inclination of the axis is the complement of the modern axial tilt; (90° minus axial tilt). 3 The rings are perpendicular to the axis of Saturn.

The final column on the pillar is a prediction of where the planets will be on May 20, 2255. The heliocentric places within the zodiac constellations define an angle now termed the heliocentric ecliptic longitude. Both are measured from the point in the sky where Aries begins. Each constellation covers 30 degrees whereas the longitude covers the whole 360 degrees spanned by all 12 constellations. The order of zodiac constellations is Aries, Taurus, Gemini, Cancer, Leo, Virgo, Libra, Scorpio, Sagittarius, Capricorn, Aquarius, and Pisces. Therefore 9°40′ in Sagittarius for Mercury becomes a (decimal) longitude of 249.667° etc.

	Heliocentric place (pillar)		JPL prediction^{1}	
planet	zodiac	long.	20/05/2255	9/06/2255^{2}
Mercury	9°40′ Sagittarius	249.67°	343.75°	94.90°
Venus	25°50′ Libra	205.83°	222.30°	254.19°
Earth	29°30' Scorpio	239.50°	235.08°	254.30°
Mars	27°42' Sagittarius	267.70°	264.86°	276.28
Jupiter	17°40' Scorpio	227.67°	not given^{3}	
Saturn	19°16' Capricorn	289.27°	not given^{3}	
1 Data for planets from Jet Propulsion Laboratory (JPL). The data is given at 0 hours U.T. on the day in question. 2 Date of transit as given in JPL data 3 JPL data for Jupiter and Saturn are not available after 2200.

The significance for the year 2255 specified in the prediction is that it is a year in which a transit of Venus occurs; the eighth after that of 1769. During such a transit the Earth, Venus and the Sun must be closely aligned, in other words the heliocentric (Note: The actual heliocentric longitudes are given by the Jet Propulsion Laboratory ephemerides) places (longitude) of the planets must be very close, as shown by the predictions for the actual transit on 9 June 2255. Therefore, since Erskine gives heliocentric places for Venus and Earth differing by about 35°, he was clearly not predicting a transit for 20 May. There is no astronomical phenomenon associated with that day but it must have had some significance for Erskine, as yet unexplained.

== Other inscriptions on the pillar ==
There are inscriptions on the four sides of the pillar but they are now difficult to read. Fortunately some are recorded in Erskine's history of Uphall and others in the account of the same parish by James Primrose. Most are in Latin, often abbreviated, but translations have been given by James Primrose in his chapter on Kirkhill.

=== East Face ===
This face has the table described in the previous section. Above the table is the quotation given at the beginning of the previous section where Erskine (Buchan) describes his construction and its scale.

=== West Face ===
An inscription in Latin:
Jacobo Buchanano, Matheseos P. Glasg. Adolefcentiae meae Custod. incorruptissicno has Amoenitates Academicas Manibus propriis dedicavi, inscripsi, sacraque esse volui. Anno ab ejus excessu XV. et a Christo natu MDCCLXXVII. Ille ego qui quondam patriae perculsus amore, Civibus oppressis, libertati succurrere aussim, Nunc Arva paterna colo, fugioque liruina regum.

Primrose gives the translation:
To James Buchanan, Professor of Mathematics at Glasgow, (Note: Erskine describes Buchanan as a professor of mathematics at Glasgow but, although nominated, he died before the faculty could proceed. He was a professor of oriental languages at that time.) the most incorruptible guardian of my youth, have I dedicated, inscribed with my own hands, these Academic Amenities, and I wish them to be sacred. On the 15th year of his death and from the birth of Christ 1771, I who formerly animated by love of country, dared to succour liberty and oppressed citizens, now cultivate my paternal fields and shun the threshold of Kings.

James Buchanan was the tutor and mentor of Erskine's early years. He died in 1761.

=== South Face ===
A quotation from Vergil's Georgics: DIGNA MANET DIVINA GLORIA RURIS which may be translated as "Pay homage to the heavenly sent land" or "The worthy glory of the Divine Country is abiding" Underneath the inscription is a large bow and arrow the significance of which is unknown, the sign for Scorpius, and an unidentified sign.

=== North Face ===
A long inscription gives abbreviated details of the location of the pillar and other points. Erskine gives a fuller version in his account of Uphall Parish.

"The latitude of Kirkhill is 55°56'17" north, the west longitude in time from Greenwich Observatory is 13′ 59′′10′′′. (Note: Erskine uses a Sexagesimal notation for divisions of an hour with one, two and three primes denoting minutes, seconds and sixtieths of seconds.) The variation of the compass 1778 in June was 22°, the dip of the north end of the needle at the same time was 71°33'. The elevation above high water mark at Lieth (sic) when there is 12 feet of water in the harbour 273 feet; it is lower than the top of Arthurs Seat, 546 feet, lower than the Observatory on Calton Hill 83, than the top of the Castle Rock 290. West longitude in time from Edinburgh Observatory, 1°8"; east longitude in time from Glasgow Observatory, 3′11′′50′′′ - distance from Kirknewton Manse in Midlothian, 20,108 feet; north from Kirknewton Manse, 17,005 feet or 2′47′′ (arc); west from Kirknewton Manse, 10,680 feet or 12′′30′′′ in time."

The mention of Kirknewton Manse links this inscription to its resident, Alexander Bryce, who provided the details of the epitome table. The latitude is in a conventional notation but the longitudes are defined in terms of time: 15 degrees of longitude corresponding to one hour. The Greenwich time separation from Kirkhill given as 13′ 59′′ 10′′′ (minutes, seconds, sixtieths) corresponds to longitude 3.496°W: the modern value is 3.46°W. Similarly time displacements of the observatories at Edinburgh and Glasgow should be read as 1′8′′ (not 1°8") and 3′11′′50′′′ respectively, corresponding to 17 and 48 arc minutes of longitude, or 11 and 31 miles. The distances from Kirknewton Manse to the pillar are direct, north and west: the latitude difference is 2′47″ (arc) and the longitude difference in time is 12′′30′′′ corresponding to 3.12 arc minutes of longitude. The height differences between the pillar and locations in Edinburgh are an interesting by-product of Bryce's survey of a canal from the city, past Kirkhill and on to Falkirk. Since there were to be no locks between the city and Broxburn the height of the pillar was easily related to that of the canal terminus and hence other known Edinburgh locations.

=== Other inscriptions ===
There are a number of other inscriptions which were close to the pillar. The globe representing the sun was engraved, in large Hebrew letters, with the question "What is man?" A plinth showing the Moon orbiting the Earth was inscribed "Newtono Magno". A small building near the pillar was inscribed "Keplero Felici". The approach to Kirkhill was guarded by pillars inscribed "Libertate quietate". On a triangular equilateral stone in Erskine's garden, was the inscription, "Great are thy works, Jehovah, infinite thy power!"

== The model re-imagined ==
In the years leading up to the 2012 transit a group of Scottish artists collaborated on an artistic realisation of the Solar System model of Erskine. The Kirkhill Pillar Project was commissioned under the auspices of Artlink Edinburgh. The Sun is represented by a light box on the top of Broxburn academy, within a few hundred metres of the Erskine's own house. The artefacts representing the nine planets are distributed around the county of West Lothian at distances given by Erskine's scale. Mars and Jupiter are represented by small spheres mounted on plinths. Mercury is represented by a cast iron replica of the cratered surface of the predominantly iron planet. Venus is represented by a schematic version of its transit over the face of the Sun. Earth, inspired by the blue and white image seen on early space missions, is represented by two planters containing blue and white flowers. Mars is a distinctive red sculpture in community woodland. A cast acrylic clear block houses a painted model of the planet Jupiter. Saturn is represented by a technical image used by James Clerk Maxwell in his explanation of the structure and stability of the rings. Uranus is represented by a band suspended from two trees: it houses seven opaque apertures which allow the light to shine through. Neptune is captured as a blue orb in a lantern above the doors of Kingscavil church. Pluto is carved into black polished granite placed in Beecraigs Country Park. Images, further details and a map of locations may be found on the website of the Kirkhill project.

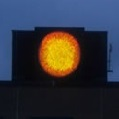
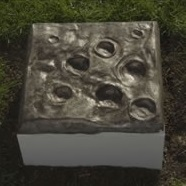
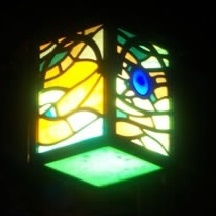
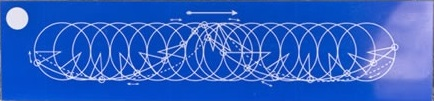
Artistic installations representing the Sun, Mercury, Neptune and Saturn.

== See also ==
- Solar System models
