= ʻImiloa Astronomy Center =

Astronomy and culture education center located in Hilo, Hawaii, United States

Coordinates: 19°42′3″N 155°5′18″W

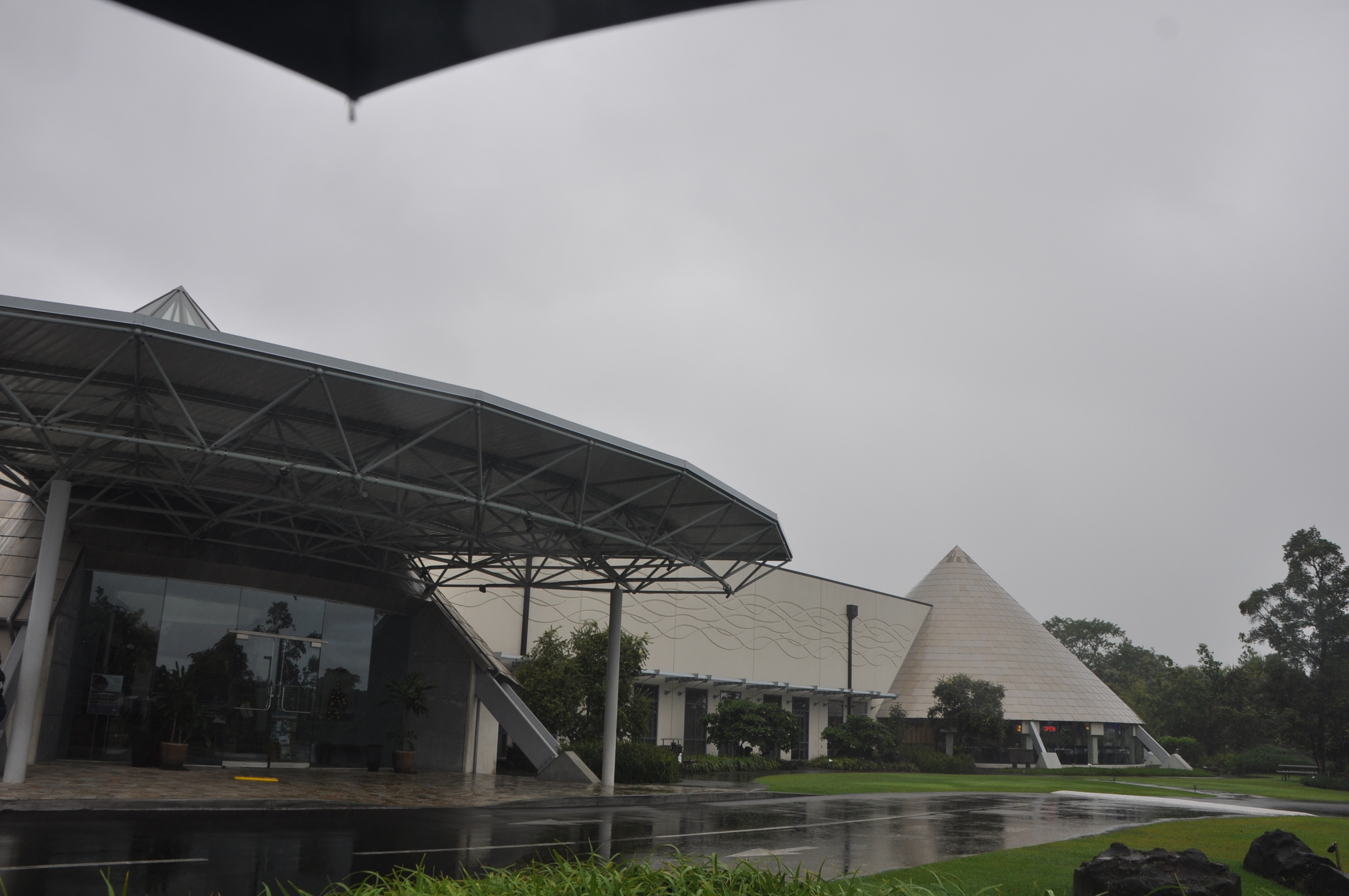
ʻImiloa Astronomy Center

ʻImiloa Astronomy Center is an astronomy and culture education center located in Hilo, Hawaii. Conceived by founding Director George Jacob in 2001, it features exhibits and shows dealing with Hawaiian culture and history, astronomy (particularly at the Mauna Kea Observatories), and the overlap between the two.

ʻImiloa includes a 120-seat planetarium, which features a fulldome video projection system. Planetarium presentations include ʻImiloa's exclusive signature show, "Maunakea: Between Earth and Sky." The bilingual exhibits (in Hawaiian and English) offer two views of Origins and Voyages, presenting the tools, visions and discoveries of the astronomers and the Polynesian voyagers (see Polynesian navigation), the first group of whom are thought to have voyaged to Hawaii from the Marquesas Islands. Visitors to ʻImiloa will leave with a new understanding of the early Polynesians, who used the stars to find these isolated islands in the middle of the vast Pacific Ocean. Hawaiians refer to these long-distance canoe explorers as "our first astronomers." Another planetarium show, "Dawn of the Space Age 3D," recounts the early days of space exploration, the so-called space race between the USSR and the United States. This is the only 3D planetarium show in the world.

Additional small theaters show a Kumulipo (Hawaiian origins) story, and an astronomy "birth of the universe" 3D presentation, underwritten by the National Astronomical Observatory of Japan (Subaru Telescope).

ʻImiloa opened to the public in February, 2006. It is part of the University of Hawaiʻi at Hilo, and is located near the base facilities for several of the Mauna Kea Observatories in University Park for Science and Technology on the UH-H campus, overlooking Hilo Bay. Its unique architectural design includes three large titanium-clad cones, representing the volcanoes Mauna Kea, Mauna Loa, and Hualālai. The extensive gardens feature native, endemic and "canoe plants" brought by the Polynesians. Exhibit halls, planetarium, gift shop, and Sky Garden café are open to the public Tuesday through Sunday. An evening "Maunakea Skies" star talk is held in the planetarium on the last Saturday of each month.

In the Hawaiian language, ʻImiloa means "exploring new knowledge." It is located at 600 ʻImiloa Place in Hilo, just north of Hawaii Route 2000 (Pūʻāinakō Street).

== Sagan Planet Walk ==
In September 2012 the Sagan Planet Walk, until then located only in Ithaca, New York, was extended with a statue representing Alpha Centauri installed at the ʻImiloa Astronomy Center. This made the Sagan Planet Walk the world's largest exhibition.

== See also ==
- 514107 Kaʻepaokaʻāwela
- 541132 Leleākūhonua
- ʻOumuamua
- Pōniuāʻena
- Pōwehi
