= Solar System model =

Illustration of the relative positions of the Sun and planets

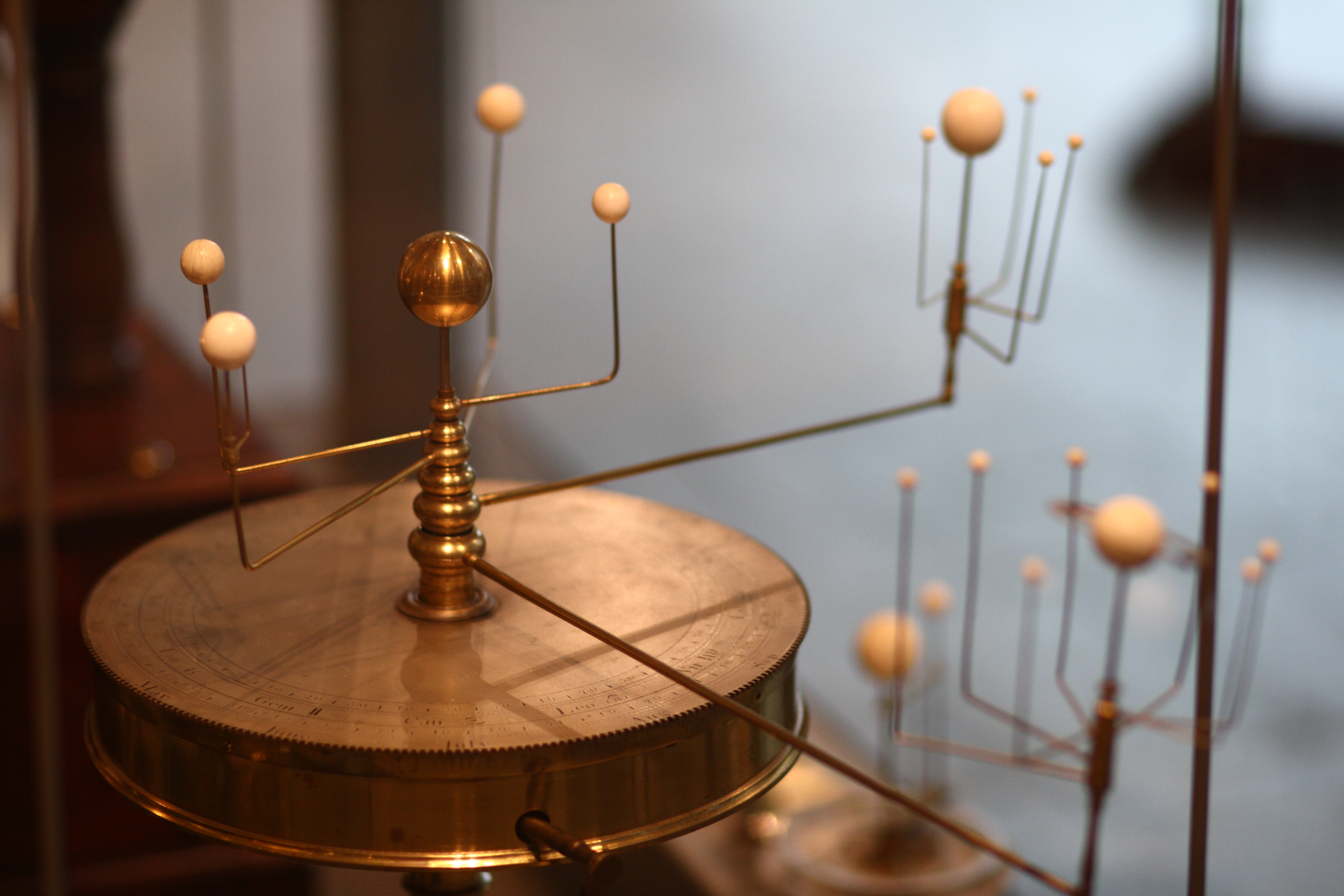
A 1766 Benjamin Martin mechanical model, or orrery, on display at the Harvard Collection of Historical Scientific Instruments

Solar System models, especially mechanical models, called orreries, that illustrate the relative positions and motions of the planets and moons in the Solar System have been built for centuries. While they often showed relative sizes, these models were usually not built to scale. The enormous ratio of interplanetary distances to planetary diameters makes constructing a scale model of the Solar System a challenging task. As one example of the difficulty, the distance between the Earth and the Sun is almost 12,000 times the diameter of the Earth.

If the smaller planets are to be easily visible to the naked eye, large outdoor spaces are generally necessary, as is some means for highlighting objects that might otherwise not be noticed from a distance. The Boston Museum of Science had placed bronze models of the planets in major public buildings, all on similar stands with interpretive labels. For example, the model of Jupiter was located in the cavernous South Station waiting area. The properly-scaled, basket-ball-sized model is 1.3 miles (2.14 km) from the model Sun which is located at the museum, graphically illustrating the immense empty space in the Solar System.

The objects in such large models do not move. Traditional orreries often did move, and some used clockworks to display the relative speeds of objects accurately. These can be thought of as being correctly scaled in time, instead of distance.

== Permanent true scale models ==
Many towns and institutions have built outdoor scale models of the Solar System. Here is a table comparing these models with the actual system.

Name	Location	Scale: 1 : …	Sun dia.	Earth dia.	Sun–Earth	Sun–Pluto	Description
Actual Solar System		1	1.392 million km	12,760 km	149.6 million km	5.914 billion km	
Sweden Solar System	Stockholm, Sweden	20,000,000	71 m	65 cm	7,600 m	300 km	permanent; country-wide (begun 1998)
Solar System Drive	Coonabarabran, Australia	38,000,000	37 m	34 cm	4,100 m	205 km	permanent; drivable; non-geodetic (est. 1997)
Crystal Lake Model Solar System	Crystal Lake, Illinois, United States	2,000,000,000	69.6 cm	0.68 cm	74.8 m	3.6 km	permanent; outer planets not in line; (est. 1994)
Space for MUCO project	Brussels, Belgium	40,000,000	34.8 m	32 cm	3,730 m	147 km	permanent; country wide; non-scale sculptures (est. 2004)
The North American Solar System Model	Saskatchewan, Canada	44,148,400	31.53 m	28.8 cm	3,389 m	133.1 km	permanent; giants-drivable. Terrestrials-walkable. (est. 2025, still under construction)
Maine Solar System	(United States) Presque Isle, Maine	93,000,000	15 m	13.7 cm	1,600 m	64 km	permanent; drivable (est.2003)
Mont Megantic Dark Sky Reserve Great Solar System	Parc national du Mont-Mégantic, Canada	100,000,000	14 m	12.4 cm	1,450 m	57 km	permanent; drivable (est.2018)
Otago Central Interplanetary Cycle Trail	Otago Central Rail Trail, New Zealand	100,000,000	13.91 m	12 cm	1,496 m	59.06 km	permanent; cyclable (est.2017)
Riverfront Museum Solar System	(United States) Peoria, Illinois	99,000,000	11 m	10.0 cm	1,200 m	47 km	permanent; drivable (est. 1992?)
Vienna Solar System	Vienna, Austria	163,764,706	8.5 m	7.78 cm	913 m	36 km	under construction since 2018. Physical + Augmented Reality
Planet Lofoten	Lofoten, Norway	200,000,000	7 m	6.4 cm	750m	30 km	under construction
Planet Trek Dane County	(United States) Madison, Wisconsin	200,000,000	7 m	6.6 cm	777 m	38.3 km	permanent; fully accessible by foot and bike paths (est. 2009)
Sunspot Solar System Model	(United States) Sunspot, New Mexico	250,000,000	5.6 m	5.1 cm	1.5 m	23.6 km	permanent, drivable
Lethbridge Solar System Model	Lethbridge, Alberta, Canada	254,000,000	5.5 m	5 cm	500 m	14.7 km (Neptune)	permanent, drivable, walkable (est. 2022)
El Sistema Solar de la comarca de Ciudad Rodrigo	Ciudad Rodrigo, Spain	290,000,000	4.8 m	4.4 cm	1.2 m	25 km	permanent, Walk & Drive
If the Earth were a Ping-Pong ball	(United Kingdom) Westminster, London	318,905,000	4.36 m	4 cm	?	?	In construction; Walk & Drive (est. 2018) Centered around Deans Yard, Westminster
Moab Scale Model of the Solar System	(United States) Moab, Utah	385,937,677	3.6 m	2.4 cm	?	15.3 km	permanent; Walk and Drive (est. 2007)
Light Speed Planet Walk	(United States) Anchorage, Alaska	390,000,000	?	?	?	16.6 km	permanent; drivable (est. 2005)
The Solar System to Scale	Estremoz, Portugal	414,000,000	3.4 m	3.1 cm	361 m	14.3 km	permanent; drivable; bikeable
Solar System Stroll	Bratislava, Slovakia	464,000,000	3 m	2.7 cm	322 m	13 km	permanent; bikeable, drivable; under construction since 2024
Somerset Space Walk	(United Kingdom) Bridgwater Canal, Somerset, England	530,000,000	2.5 m	?	?	11 km	permanent; bikeable (est. 1997)
York's Solar System model	(United Kingdom) York, England	575,872,239	2.4 m	2.2 cm	260 m	10.3 km	permanent; bikeable (est. 1999)
Traverse Bay Community Solar System	(United States) Traverse City, Michigan	592,763,356	0.9 m	?	209 m	10.0 km	permanent; bikeable (est. 2004)
Michigan Solar System Model	(United States) Coleman, Michigan	608,000,000	2.3 m	2.1 cm	324 m	9.8 km	permanent; bike trail Sun and Pls. Spheres (2017)
Solar System	Opava, Czech Republic	627,000,000	2.2 m	2.0 cm	239 m	9.42 km	permanent; bikeable; walkable; drivable (est. 2006)
Nine Views	Zagreb, Croatia	680,000,000	2.0 m	1.9 cm	225 m	8.7 km	permanent; bikeable (est. 2004)
Walk the Solar System	Fort St. John, British Columbia, Canada	682,353,000	2.0 m	1.9 cm	219 m	8.6 km	under construction
McCarthy Observatory	(United States) New Milford, Connecticut	761,155,000	1.8 m	1.7 cm	195 m	7.1 km	permanent; bikeable (est. 2009)
Planet Walk	(United States) Glen Burnie, Maryland.	781,000,000	?	?	191.5 m	7.56 km	Walkable, bikeable (est. 2008). Part of the permanent Baltimore & Annapolis Trail.
Trilho do Sistema Solar	Paredes de Coura, Portugal	831,000,000	1.675 m	1.533 cm	180 m	5.42 km (Neptune)	permanent; walkable; bikeable (est. 2016)
Planetenpad Utrecht	Utrecht, The Netherlands	1,000,000,000	1.3 m	1.3 cm	150 m	7.4 km (Neptune)	Leads from Centre Utrecht to Rhijnauwen, on foot, on bike or on kayak
Model of the Solar System	Helsinki, Finland	1,000,000,000	1.4 m	1.2 cm	149.6 m	6.1 km	permanent; bikeable
Planetenmodell Hagen	Hagen, Germany	1,000,000,000	1.4 m	1.3 cm	150 m	5.9 km	permanent; bikeable (est. 1959)
Planetenweg Schwarzbach	Kriftel, Germany	1,000,000,000	1.4 m	1.3 cm	150 m	5.9 km	permanent; bikeable (est. 1998)
Uetliberg Planetenweg	Zürich, Switzerland	1,000,000,000	1.4 m	1.3 cm	150 m	5.9 km	permanent; bikeable
Planetenwanderweg	Ehrenfriedersdorf, Germany	1,000,000,000	1.4 m	1.3 cm	150 m	5.9 km	permanent; bikeable
Planetary Trail	Hradec Králové, Czech Republic	1,000,000,000	1.4 m	1.3 cm	150 m	5.9 km	permanent; bikeable (est. 2005)
Planetary Trail	Prague, Czech Republic	1,000,000,000	1.4 m	1.3 cm	150 m	13 km (Sedna as discovered); 5.9 km (Pluto)	permanent; bike & walk; all objects above 1000km; (est. 13 May 2018)
Melbourne Solar System	Melbourne, Australia	1,000,000,000	1.4 m	1.3 cm	150 m	5.9 km (Pluto); 40 140 km (Proxima Centauri)	permanent; bikeable (est. 2008) Proxima Centauri scale distance calculated travelling Melbourne to Melbourne via the Poles.
Scale Model Solar System	(United States) Eugene, Oregon	1,000,000,000	1.4 m	1.2 cm	150 m	5.9 km	permanent; bikeable (est. 1997)
Planetstien, Sandnes	Sandnes, Norway	1,000,000,000	1.4 m	1.2 cm	150 m	5.9 km	permanent; walkable, bikeable (est. 2010)
Planetstien, Lemvig	Lemvig, Denmark	1,000,000,000	1.4 m	1.2 cm	150 m	5.9 km	permanent; walkable
Grand Trunk Pathway Solar System Model	(Canada) Terrace, British Columbia	1,000,000,000	1.4 m	1.3 cm	150 m	6 km	permanent; walkable/bikeable (est. 2018)
Planet Walk	Munich, Germany	1,290,000,000	1.1 m	1.0 cm	116 m	4.6 km	permanent; walkable (est. 1995)
Strolling at the speed of light	La Malbaie, Quebec, Canada	1,500,000,000	0.9 m	0.8 cm	100 m	3 km (Neptune)	permanent; walkable (est. 2009) (temp?)
State of the Solar System	(United States) Bellingham, Washington	1,826,770,000	0.762 m	0.6858 cm	82 m	?	permanent; walkable (est. 2016)
Meteoria Söderfjärden	Vaasa, Finland	2,000,000,000	0.7 m	?	?	?	permanent; walkable
Planetenweg Göttingen	Göttingen, Germany	2,000,000,000	0.70 m	0.65 cm	75 m	3.2 km	permanent; walkable/bikeable (est. 2013)
Upper Beaches Scale Solar System	Toronto, Ontario, Canada	2,000,000,000	0.7 m	0.6 cm	75 m	2.81 km	permanent; walkable/bikeable (est. 2026)
Solar System Walking Tour	(United States) Gainesville, Georgia	2,000,000,000	0.7 m	0.6 cm	75 m	2.9 km	permanent; walkable (est. 2000)
Rymdpromenaden ("Spacewalk")	Gothenburg, Sweden	2,000,000,000	0.7 m	0.6 cm	75 m	3 km	permanent; walkable (est. 1978)
Montshire Museum of Science	(United States) Norwich, Vermont	2,200,000,000	0.6 m	0.6 cm	68 m	2.7 km	permanent; walkable
Ride to Pluto: Boise's Solar System	(United States) Boise Greenbelt, Boise, Idaho	2,200,000,000	0.5 m	?	?	2.4 km	permanent; walkable & bikeable
The Solar walk	(United States) Longview, Washington	2,240,000,000	0.6 m	0.6 cm	56.94 m	2.7 km	permanent; walkable (est. 2001)
Akaa Solar System Scale Model	Akaa, Finland	3,000,000,000	0.46 m	0.4 cm	49.9 m	1.958 km (Pluto); 13 370 km (Proxima Centauri)	permanent; walkable (est. 2017), Proxima Centauri in Yulara, Australia
Elmhurst Scale Model of the Solar System	(United States) Elmhurst, Illinois	3,044,620,000	0.5 m	0.4 cm	49.1 m	1.929 km	permanent; walk & drive (est. 2013)
Solar System model group of sculptures	Kecskemét, Hungary	3,300,000,000	0.418 m	0.4 cm	45 m	1.8 km	permanent; walkable (est. 2002)
Milky Way path	Westerbork, The Netherlands	3,700,000,000	?	?	?	2.5 km	permanent; walkable
Solar Walk	(United States) Gainesville, Florida	4,000,000,000	0.3 m	0.3 cm	37.4 m	1.5 km	permanent; walkable (est. 2002)
Otford Solar System Model	(United Kingdom) Otford, England	4,595,700,000	0.3 m	0.3 cm	32 m	900 m	permanent; walkable; Includes: Proxima Centauri in Los Angeles, USA; Barnard's Star in Port Stanley, Falkland Islands; Sirius in Sydney, Australia; and Ross 154 in Christchurch, New Zealand
Wooster Planet Walk	(United States) Wooster, Ohio	5,000,000,000	0.3 m	0.3 cm	30 m	1.2 km	permanent; walkable (est. 2014)
The Sagan Planet Walk	(United States) Ithaca, New York	5,000,000,000	0.3 m	0.3 cm	30 m	1.2 km	permanent; walkable (est. 1997)
Delmar Loop Planet Walk	(United States) University City, Missouri	5,000,000,000	0.3 m	0.2 cm	30 m	870 m (Neptune)	permanent; walkable (est. 2009)
The Solar Walk	(United States) Cleveland, Ohio	5,280,000,000	0.3 m	0.2 cm	28.4 m	1.1 km	permanent; walkable
Solar System Walk An Exploration of Scale	(United States) Carlsbad, California	5,280,000,000	?	?	28 m	1.119 km	Located near Lake Calavera
O Sistema Solar no Parque	Natal, Brazil	7,000,000,000	0.2 m	1.8 mm	22 m	875 m	permanent; walkable/bikeable (est. 3 June 2016)
A True Scale Model of the Solar System	(United States) Cookeville, Tennessee	10,000,000,000	0.14 m	0.12 cm	15 m	590 m	permanent; walkable (est. 2017)
Voyage National Program ^{[1]}	(United States) National Mall, Washington, D.C. (2001) Kansas City, Missouri (2008)Space Center Houston, Texas (2008) Corpus Christi, Texas (2009)Boulder, Colorado (2021) Palo Alto, California (2022) Broken Arrow, Oklahoma (2022) Ocala, Florida (2022) Calcasieu Parish, Louisiana (2022) Dover, New Hampshire (2023) Spokane, Washington (2022) Memphis, Tennessee (2023) Chalmette, Louisiana (2023) Jonesboro, Arkansas (2023) Troy, New York (2024)	10,000,000,000	0.1 m	0.1 cm	15 m	600 m	permanent; walkable; US national program
Lake Innitou Thousand Yard Interplanetary Walk	(United States) Woburn, Massachusetts	10,000,000,000	0.23 m (bowling ball)	N/A (stone plaque)	24 m	932 m (1019 yd)	permanent; walkable (est. 2004); along the sidewalk by Horn Pond.
NJ Botanical Garden	(United States) Ringwood, New Jersey	10,000,000,000	0.2 m	2.0 cm	23.8 m	927 m	walkable
Colorado Scale Model Solar System	(United States) Fiske Planetarium, Boulder, Colorado	10,000,000,000	0.1 m	0.1 cm	15 m	600 m	permanent; walkable (est. 1987)
Anstruther Model Solar System	(United Kingdom) Anstruther, Scotland	10,000,000,000	0.1 m	0.1 cm	15 m	600 m	permanent; walkable (est. 2014)
Le Chemin Solaire	(France) La Couyère, Brittany	10,000,000,000	1 m	0.1 cm	?	450 m	permanent; walkable (est. 2011)
Solar Walk UofT Scarborough	(Canada) Toronto, Ontario and Eureka, Nunavut	10,000,000,000	0.14 m	0.13 cm	15 m	591 m	permanent; walkable/bikeable (est. 2017)
MIT's Infinite Solar System	(United States) Cambridge, Massachusetts	30,000,000,000	4.6 cm	0.43 mm	5.0 m	200 m	permanent; walkable (est. 2018); along "Infinite Corridor"
Solar System Lawn Model	(United States) Griffith Observatory, Los Angeles, California	105,000,000,000	1.32 cm	0.12 mm	1.42 m	56 m	permanent; walkable; engraved in the front sidewalk

== Other models of the Solar System: historic, temporary, virtual, or dual-scale ==
Name	Location	Scale	Sun dia.	Earth dia.	Sun-Earth	Sun-Pluto	Description
Sol Chicago	(United States) Illinois, Chicago	1:73,660,000	19 m	17.3 cm	2,050 m	61 km (Neptune)	(temporary) proposed
Aurinkokuntapolku	Piikkiö, Finland	1:100,000,000	-				uses two different scales for distance and size
Community Solar System Trail	(United States) Boston, Massachusetts	1:400,000,000	3.5 m	3.2 cm	380 m	15.3 km	permanent; drivable (established in 1997, removed in 2015)
Sorghvliet	The Hague, Netherlands	1:696,000,000	2.0 m	1.8 cm	215 m	6.5 km (Neptune)	(temporary)
Kirkhill model 1776 (Note: Possibly the first accurate scale model after the measurement of the astronomical unit in 1769.)	Scotland	1:778,268,620.8	1.8 m	1.6 cm	197 m	-	decayed
Planetenpad Utrecht	Utrecht, Netherlands	1:1,000,000,000	1.3 m	1.3 cm	150 m	7.4 km (Neptune)	Leads from Centre Utrecht to Rhijnauwen, on foot, on bike or by kayak
Le Chemin des planètes	Saint-Luc, Switzerland	1:1,000,000,000	1.4 m	1.3 cm	150 m	5.9 km	uses two different scales for distance and size
Planets on the Path	(United States) Chicago, Illinois	1:2,195,000,000			457 m	13.5 miles	(2015, temporary)
Naas Virtual Solar System	(Republic of Ireland) Naas, County Kildare	1 : 154,557,330	9 m	82 mm	968 m	29 km (Neptune)	In Ireland, this instantly recognisable roadside spherical sculpture is well known, and is used as the model for the Sun. The website maps out the planetary orbits and shows everyday objects to scale the planets (e.g. a golf ball for Mars)
Eise Eisinga Visvliet	Visvliet, The Netherlands	1: 870,000,000	160 cm	1.5 cm	172 m	n/a	Permanent installation honouring Eise Eisinga, the creator of the world famous Planetarium in Franeker, who lived in Visviet in 1700. As the original Planetarium only includes the planets up to Saturn, so does this one.
Saskatoon Solar Walk	Saskatoon, Saskatchewan	1 : 1,275,600,000	109 cm	1 cm	110 m	4,500 m	Personal and public art installation created by Roman Rabbitskin in 2023
Planet Walk Malta	Buġibba, Malta	1:2,956,760,000 (distance) / 695,000,000 (sizes)	2.0 m	1.84 cm	50.60 m	2.0 km (Neptune)	Leads from Malta Aquarium west along promenade
The Madison Planet Stroll	(United States) Madison, Wisconsin	1:4,000,000,000	0.3 m	0.3 cm	37 m	1.5 km	(virtual)
Solar System Stroll	Perth, Western Australia	1:5,000,000,000	0.3 m	0.3 cm	30 m	1.2 km	permanent; walkable (est. 2016)
The Thousand-Yard Model	(virtual)	1:6,336,000,000	0.2 m	0.2 cm	25 m	1 km	The scale of the planets is the same as the scale between them, and the planets are represented by everyday objects; the Earth is a peppercorn, Jupiter is a walnut, and Neptune is a coffee bean.
Lafayette Walk	(United States) Detroit, Michigan	1:6,336,000,000	23 cm	0.2 cm	25 m	983 m	A walking demonstration of (un)imaginable distances. "It's nowhere near Graham's Number."
(dismantled)	(Canada) Saint-Louis-du-Ha! Ha!, Quebec	1:10,000,000,000	0.1 m	0.1 cm	15 m	0.6 km	(dismantled) (est. 1985)
The Solar System, to scale, for a school yard	PDF for printing	1:11,945,400,000	11.6 cm	0.1 cm	12.5 m	492 m	PDFs, A4 and 8½″×11″, to be printed, affixed to cards which are affixed to sticks; then to be held by children standing in a school yard. Includes major moons and asteroids.

Several sets of geocaching caches have been laid out as Solar System models.

== See also ==
- Numerical model of the Solar System
- Historical models of the Solar System
- Infinite Corridor
