= Jan Wanggaard =

Norwegian artist

Jan Wanggaard (born 16 February 1958) is a Norwegian artist with a wide range of expressions from pure sculpture to land art in a wide sense. He was World Champion in windsurfing in 1981 and studied Art and Design in Newcastle upon Tyne, England (1983–1987).

== Life and career ==
One of Wanggaard's works is Planet Lofoten, a giant installation representing the Solar System placed in the wild nature of West Lofoten. A documentary film called Panta Rei (norw. Alt Flyter) by Lars NIlssen follows Wanggaard over a period of three years during realization of Planet Lofoten. This film won Award for Creativity at FIFA Art Film Festival in Montreal 2007. Wanggaard is Manager for Maud Returns Home, a crossover artproject/salvage-operation for the Polarship Maud of world famous Polar Explorer Roald Amundsen, who was the first man on the South Pole. The intended Salvage Operation is planned to be realized during 2012–13. Maud sunk in 1930 in the North West Passage and is planned to be brought back to Vollen and Norway where she was built nearly 100 years ago. The intention is to build a Maud Museum in Vollen.

== Works and exhibitions ==
- PLANET LOFOTEN An Installation of the Solar System in Lofoten, Norway.
- MISVÆR MARIT A historical practical research project on classic Viking-style sailing/fishing boats.
- BLUE EYE AMPHI The Millenium place of Moskenes Municipality, Lofoten.

In recent years Wanggaard has been invited to present his works at a number of Galleries in Europe such as Museum of Modern Art, Mudam in Luxembourg, Triennale di Milano, Italy and Gallery Trafo, Norway.
