= Somerset Space Walk =

Sculpture trail in Somerset, England

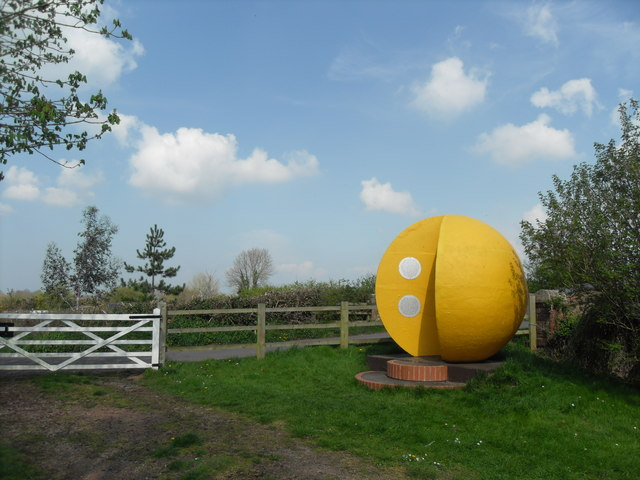
The walk begins here: the Sun model at Higher Maunsel Lock

The Somerset Space Walk is a sculpture trail model of the Solar System, located in Somerset, England. The model uses the towpath of the 22-kilometre (14-mile) Bridgwater and Taunton Canal to display a model of the Sun and its planets in their proportionally correct sizes and distances apart. Unusually for a Solar System model, there are two sets of planets, so that the diameter of the orbits is represented.

Aware of the inadequacies of printed pictures of the Solar System, the inventor Pip Youngman designed the Space Walk as a way of challenging people's perceptions of space and experiencing the vastness of the Solar System. The model is built to a scale of 1:530,000,000, meaning that one millimetre on the model equates to 530 kilometres. The Sun is sited at Higher Maunsel Lock, and one set of planets is installed in each direction along the canal towards Taunton and Bridgwater; the distance between the Sun and each model of Pluto being 11 kilometres (6.8 mi). For less hardy walkers, the inner planets are within 430 metres (1,410 ft) of the Sun, and near to the Maunsel Canal Centre (and tea shop) at Lower Maunsel Lock, where a more detailed leaflet about the model is available.

The Space Walk was opened on 9 August 1997 by British astronomer Heather Couper. In 2007, a project team from Somerset County Council refurbished some of the models.

== Background ==
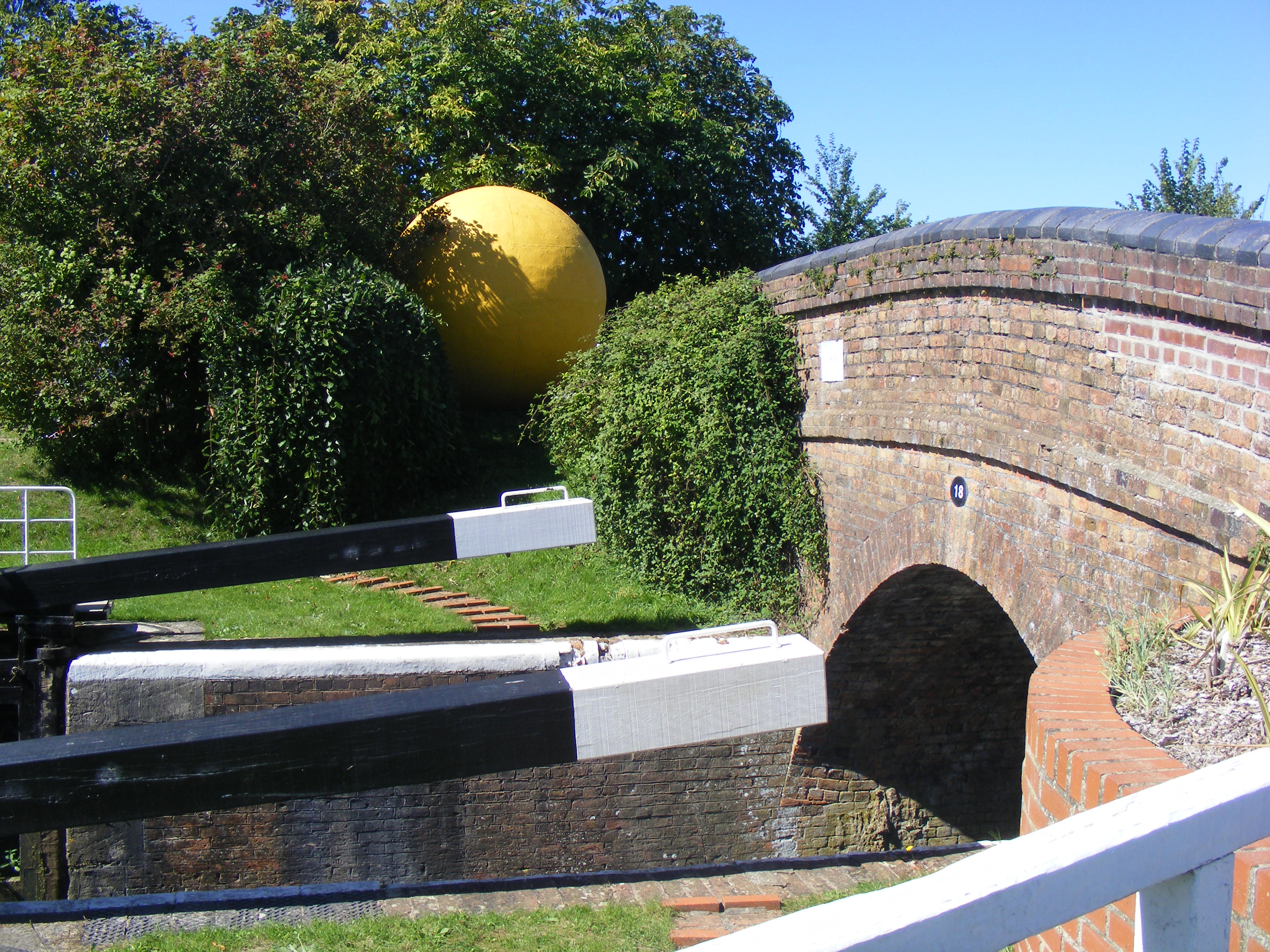
Maunsel Lock, showing the model of the Sun at the centre of the two sets of planets

The Walk is a joint venture between the Taunton Solar Model Group and British Waterways, with support from Somerset County Council, Taunton Deane Borough Council and the Somerset Waterways Development Trust. The Taunton Solar Model Group comprised Pip Youngman, Trevor Hill – a local physics teacher who had been awarded the title of "Institute of Physics (IOP) Physics Teacher of the Year" – and David Applegate who, during his time as Mayor of Taunton, had expressed a wish to see some kind of science initiative in the area. Youngman came up with the idea for the Space Walk, and Hill assisted by calculating the respective positions and sizes of the planets.

Funding for the project came from the Committee on the Public Understanding of Science (COPUS), the initial advertising leaflet was paid for by the Particle Physics and Astronomy Research Council (PPARC) and there was also a small grant from Sustrans, who fund art installations along cyclepaths, to deal with maintenance requirements in the years before Somerset County Council took on that responsibility. In order to apply for the COPUS funding Youngman needed two 'sponsors', so he wrote to Arthur C. Clarke (a local boy himself, then living in Sri Lanka) and Patrick Moore, who both wrote warm letters in support. Arthur C Clarke's brother Fred read out his letter at the opening ceremony.

ReadyMix Concrete supplied the concrete for the plinths, and Avimo (now part of Thales Group), a local defence contractor, supplied the steel for the models.

== Individual models ==
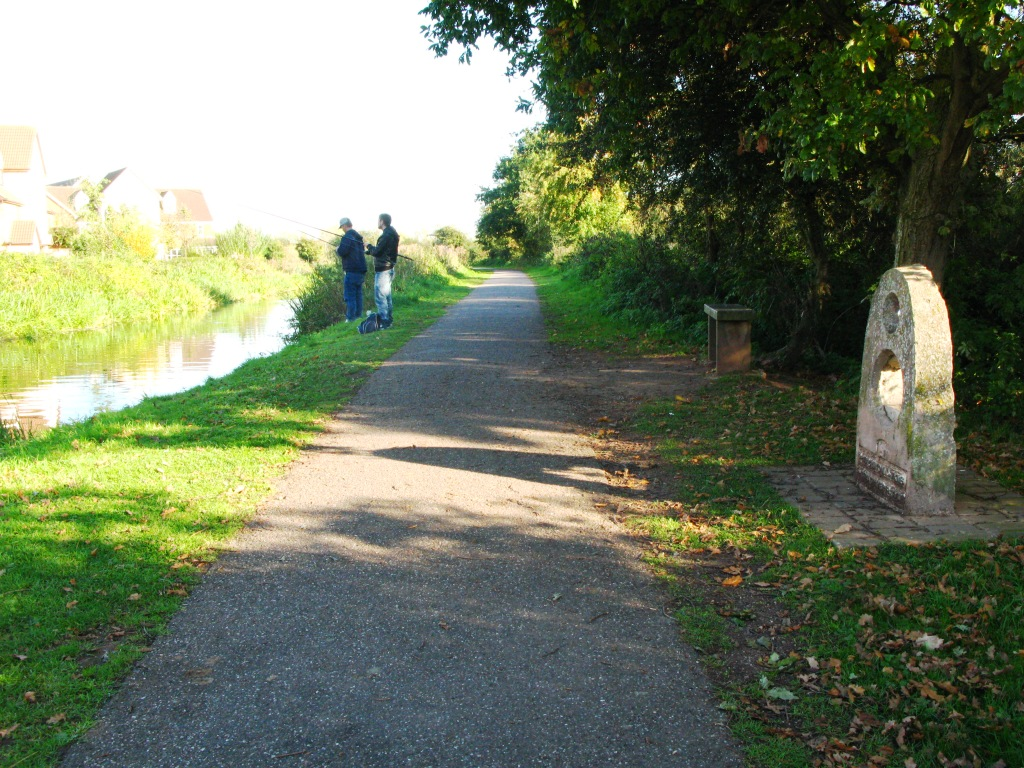
The model of Uranus in its setting beside the canal at Creech St Michael.

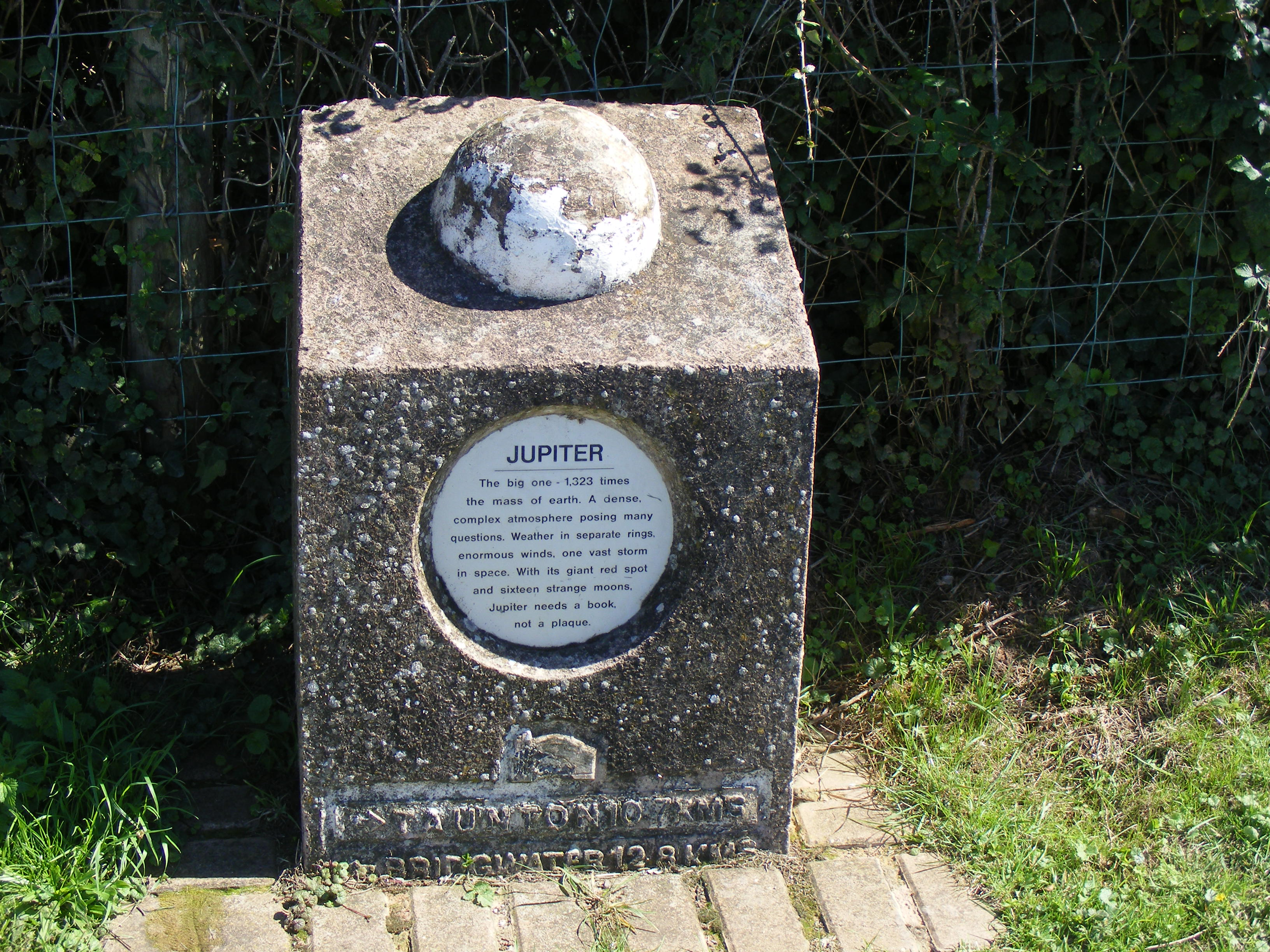
The model of Jupiter

The model of the Sun is a 2.5 metres (8.2 ft)-wide 14-ton concrete sphere, with a vertical segment removed to give two vertical faces upon which explanatory plates are mounted. The solid sphere was cast by Pip Youngman and Trevor Hill in the grounds of what was the SWEB storage yard adjacent to the Obridge Viaduct in Taunton. Originally 'natural' in colour (matching the other models) it was painted yellow as part of the refurbishment, making it much more visible.

Each of the smallest planet models is contained within a round-topped concrete plinth about 1 metre (3.3 ft) high. The stainless steel model is held inside a circular hole through the side of the plinth; hence the model of the planet may be viewed by looking through the hole. The plinths were created by Youngman using fibreglass moulds which he had also made.

The models of the largest gas giants, Saturn and Jupiter, are moulded as part of the top face of the concrete pillars. Originally concrete-coloured, they have been painted as part of the refurbishment.

Each pillar doubles-up as a milepost: the distance to Bridgwater and Taunton is cast in the concrete at ground level – below a depiction of the British Waterways 'bridge' logo – although the sculptures are sited according to the spacings needed for the model, and not at kilometre increments for the convenience of boaters.

On each pillar is a plaque containing a short inscription describing the planet. The Earth inscription reads:

"Earth orbits far enough from the heat of the Sun for water to be liquid, near enough not to freeze, for air to be a gas and earth a solid. With gravity strong enough to hold our atmosphere, gentle enough to allow delicate life forms. Rotating to give our day and night, tilted to give the four seasons. Enormous to us, tiny on the cosmic scale. Our home, unique, beautiful, fragile." – Pip Youngman

== Nearest star ==
The installation does not include a model of the Solar System's nearest star for comparison. On the same scale as the other models, the nearest star (Proxima Centauri, which is about one-seventh the size of the Sun) would need to be a red ball 37.5 centimetres (14.8 in) in diameter sited 76,000 km (47,000 mi) away (roughly twice the circumference of Earth).

== Pip Youngman ==
The Space Walk's designer, Philip Robert Vassar Youngman (born: 26 August 1924, Hunstanton, Norfolk – died: 23 May 2007, Taunton, Somerset), known as 'Pip', was a designer and inventor of mechanical apparatus. Around 1969, Youngman was approached by the Open University to adapt a mechanical calculator he had designed, originally prototyped in Lego, into a product suitable for school use. The result was the "Ball Operated Binary Calculator And Tutor" (BOBCAT), a mechanical model for teaching binary arithmetic and the inner workings of the computer, using ball bearings for binary data bits and plastic levers for the calculating logic.

== Location ==
The trail can be walked either from Taunton's Brewhouse Theatre to Maunsel Lock (Pluto to the Sun) or from Bridgwater's Morrison's Supermarket to Maunsel Lock (also Pluto to the Sun) or of course, vice versa.

The locations of the end and middle point (with postcodes and coordinates) are:

- Pluto in Taunton – TA1 1JL 51.01826°N 3.10261°W
- Maunsel Canal Centre – TA7 0DH 51.0626°N 2.98888°W
- Pluto in Bridgwater – TA6 3RF 51.12529°N 3.00794°W

== Model gallery ==
The models of the Solar System, in order:

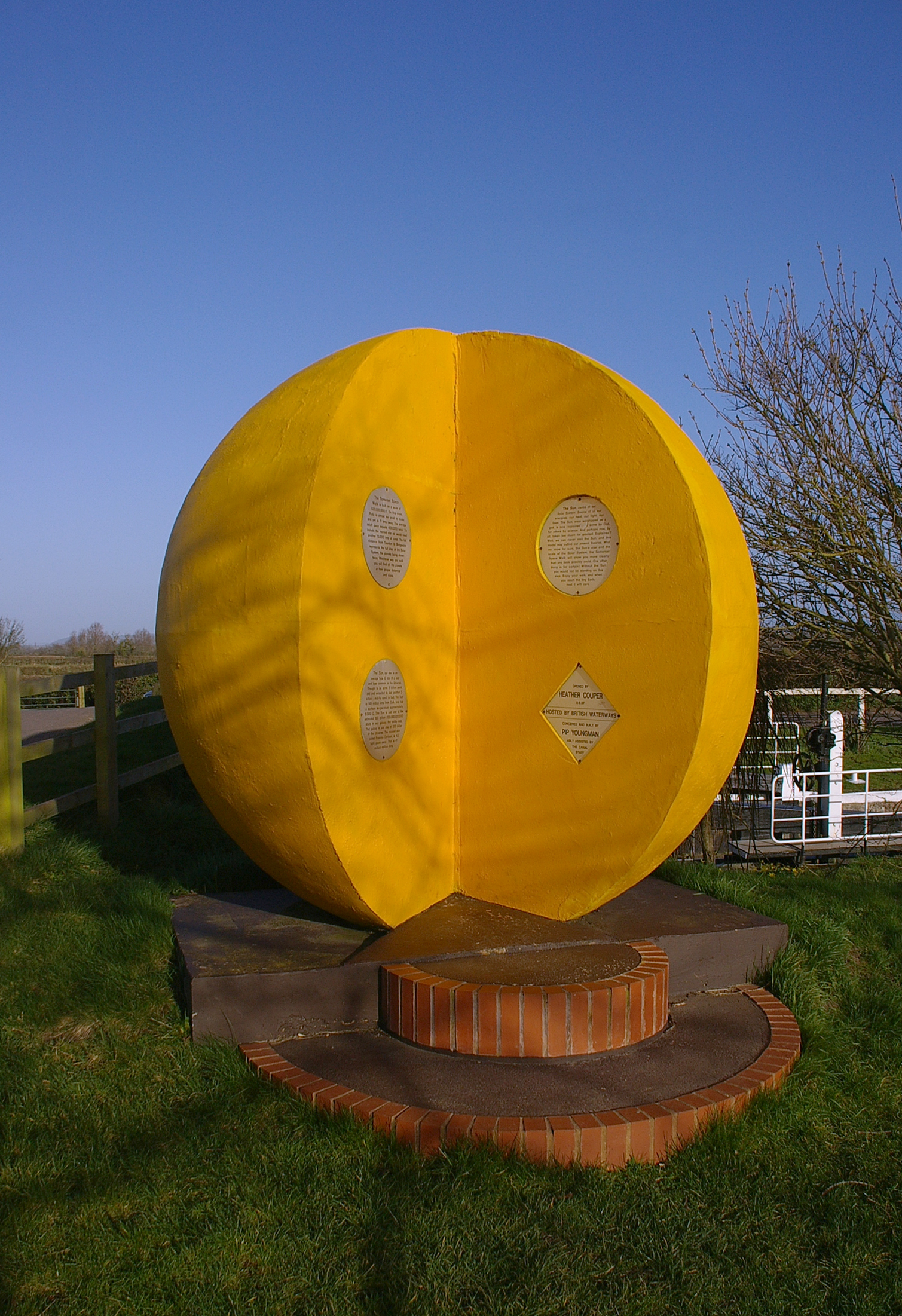
The Sun

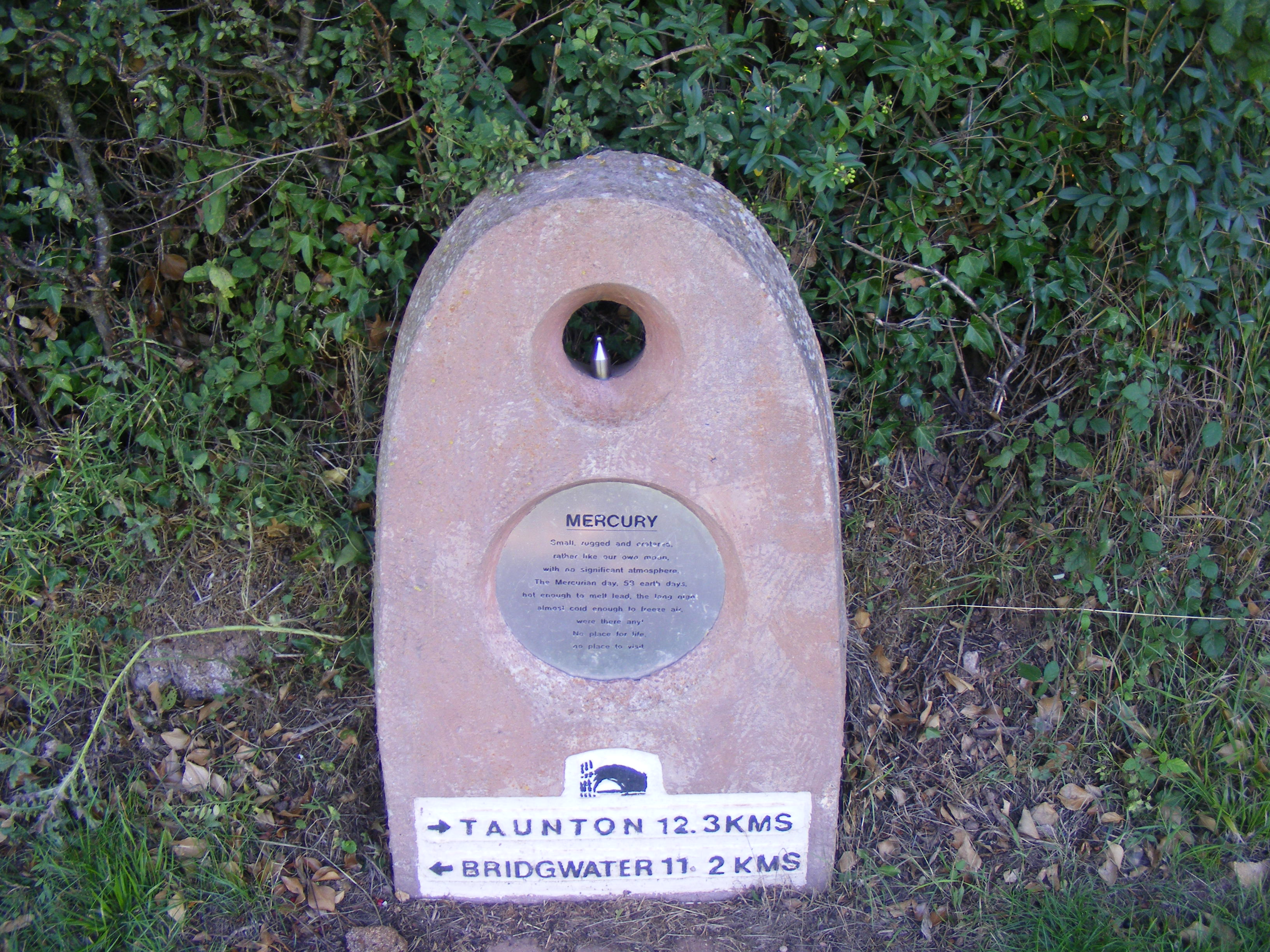
Mercury

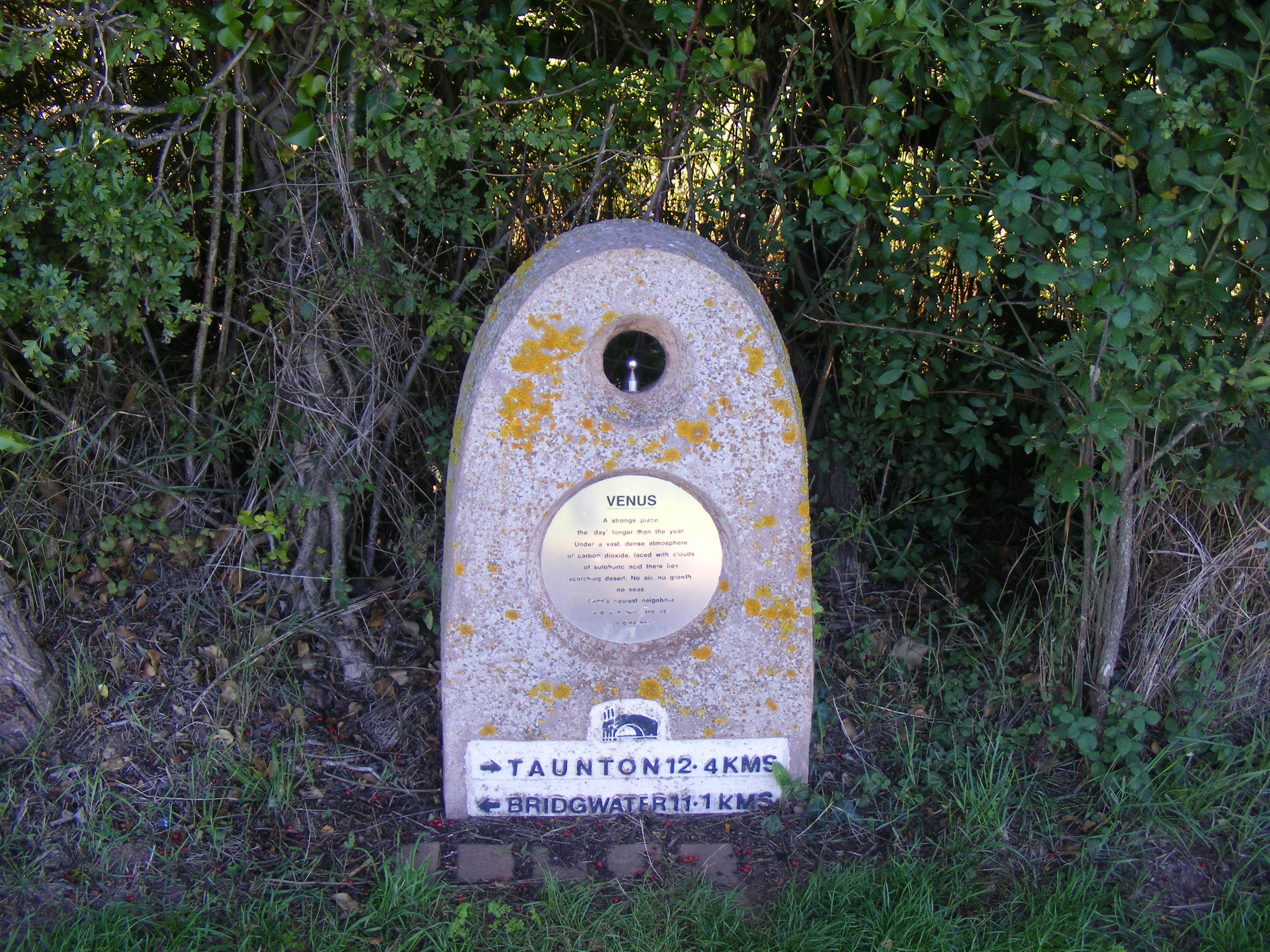
Venus

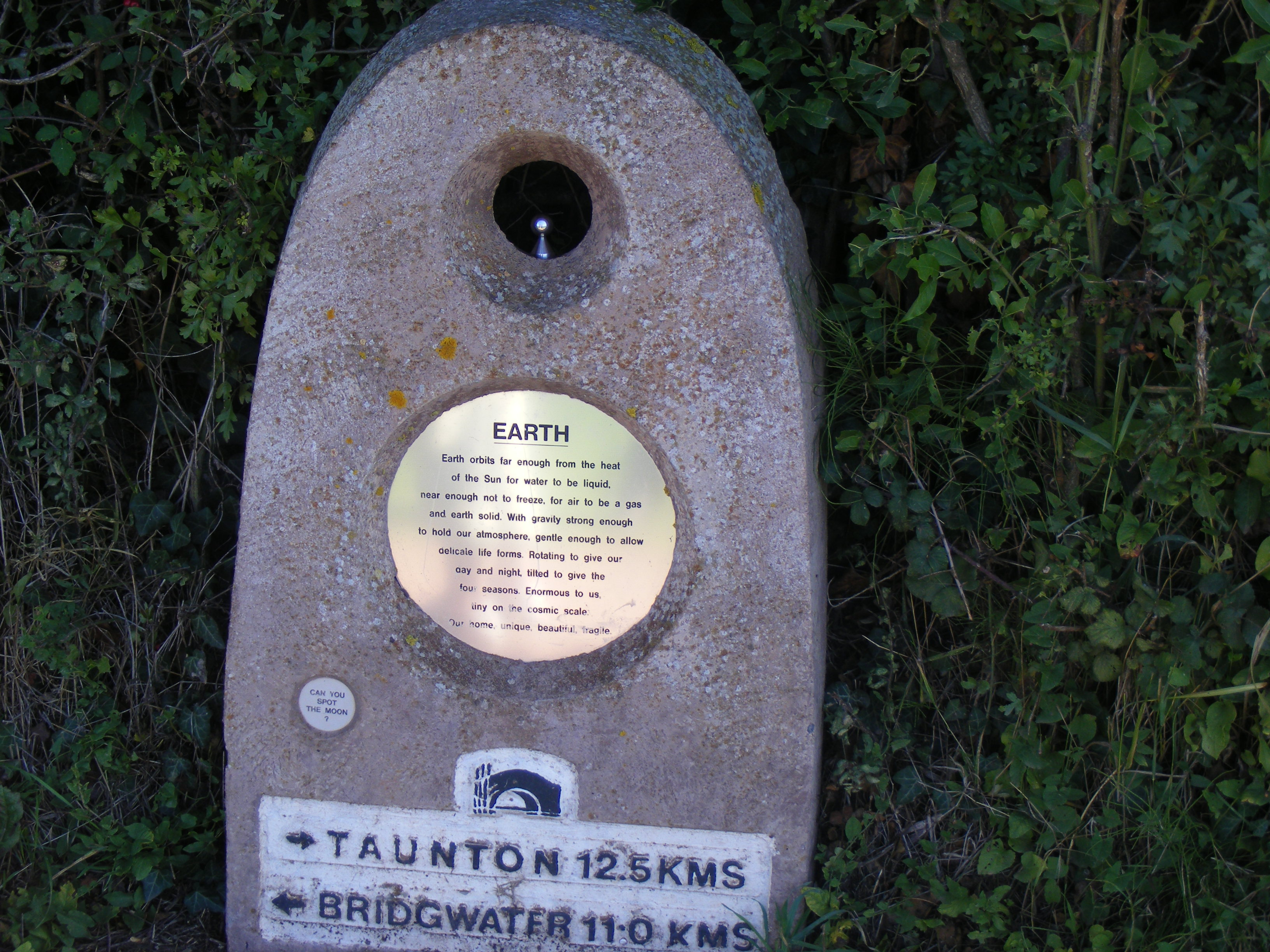
Earth (and Moon)

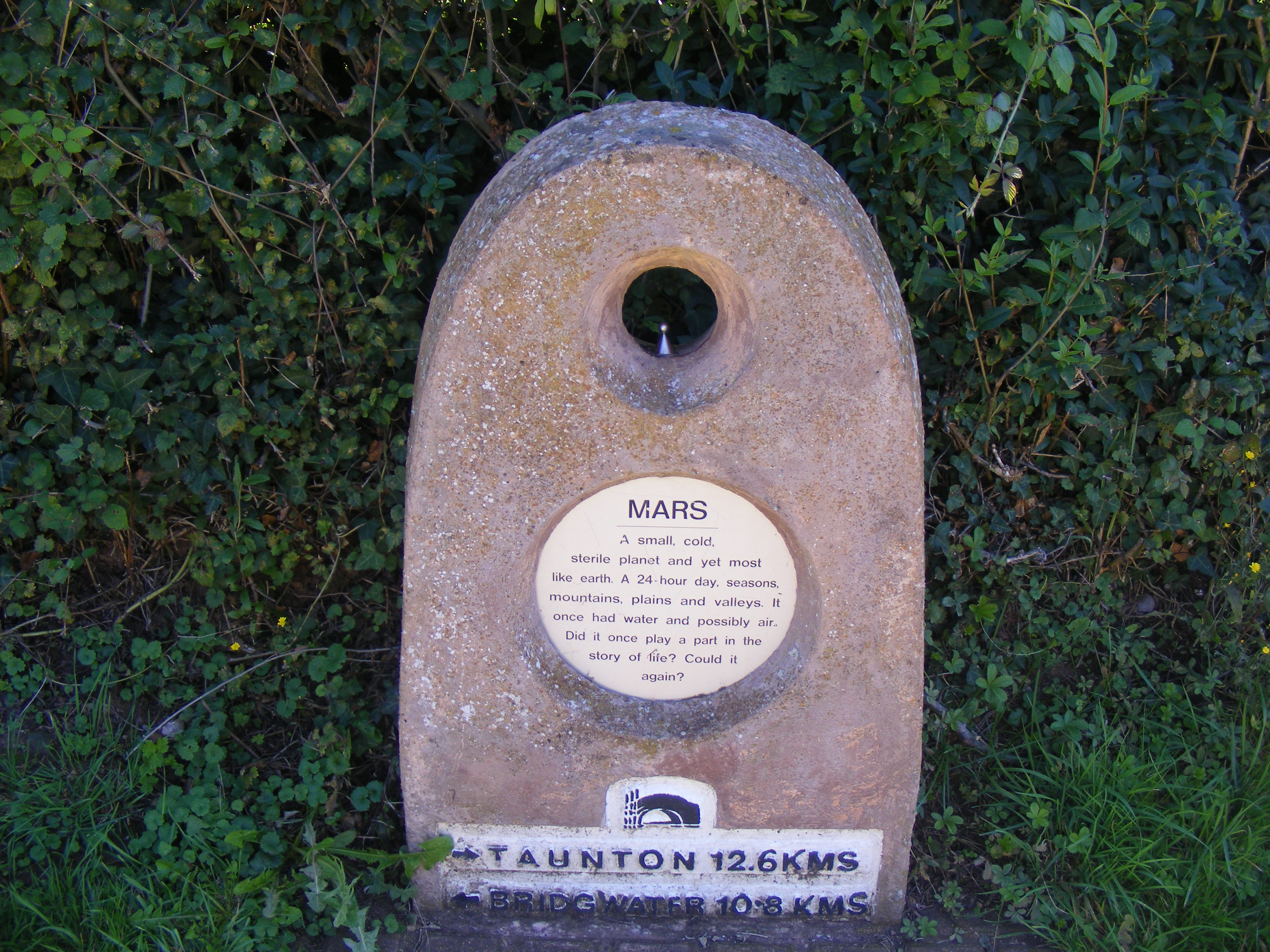
Mars

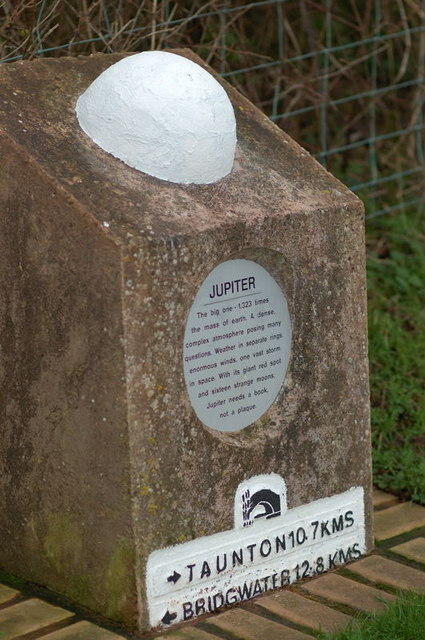
Jupiter

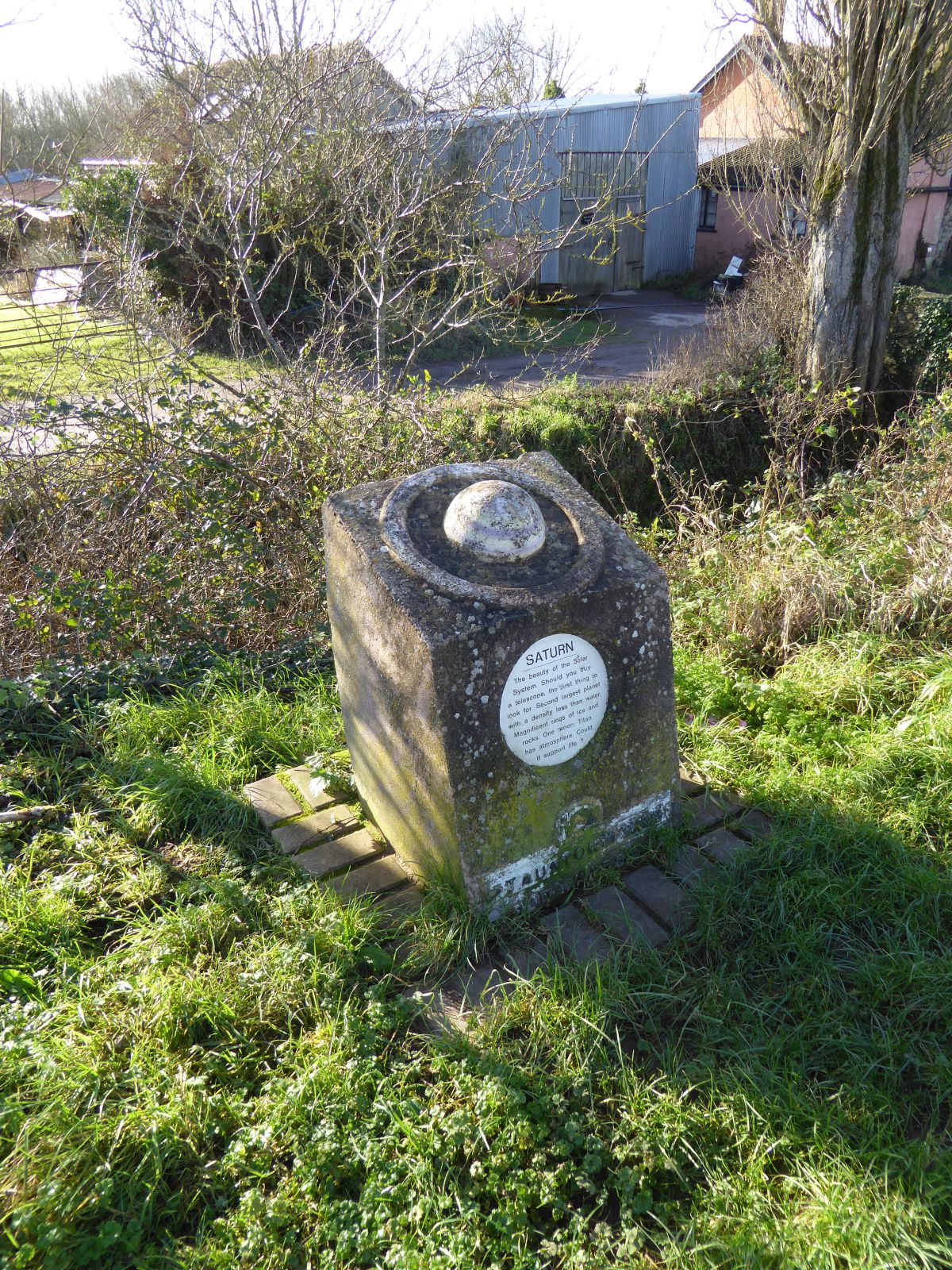
Saturn

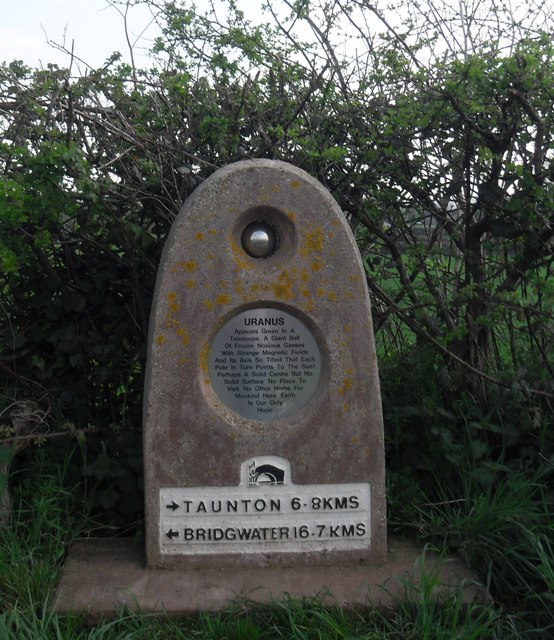
Uranus

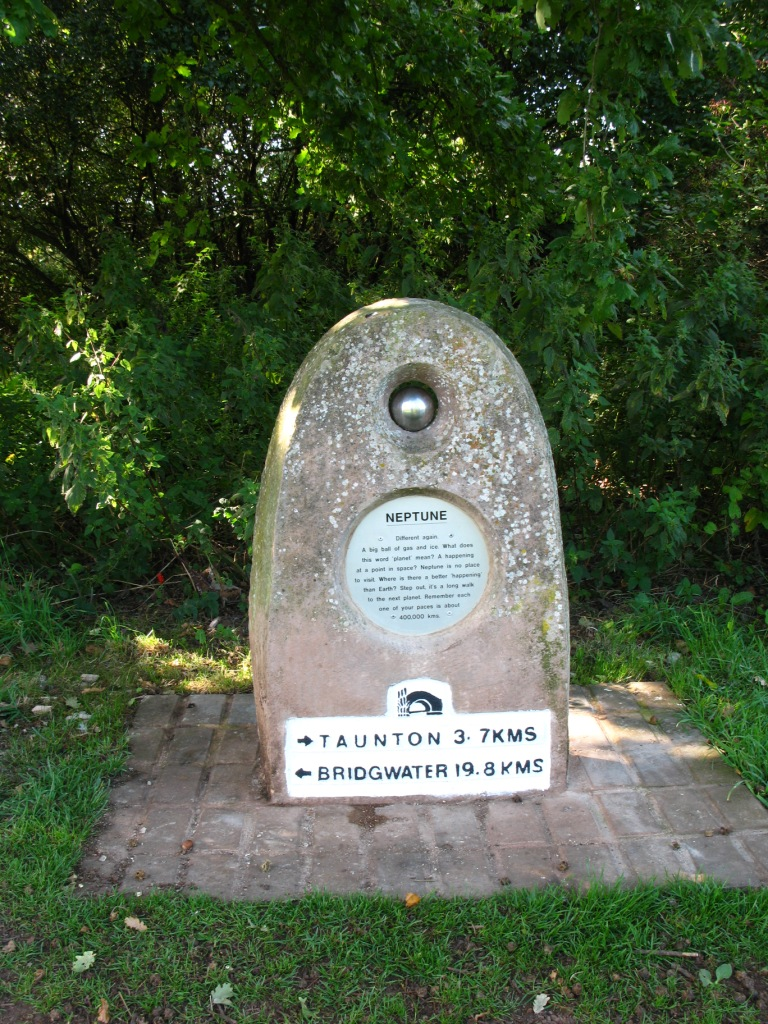
Neptune

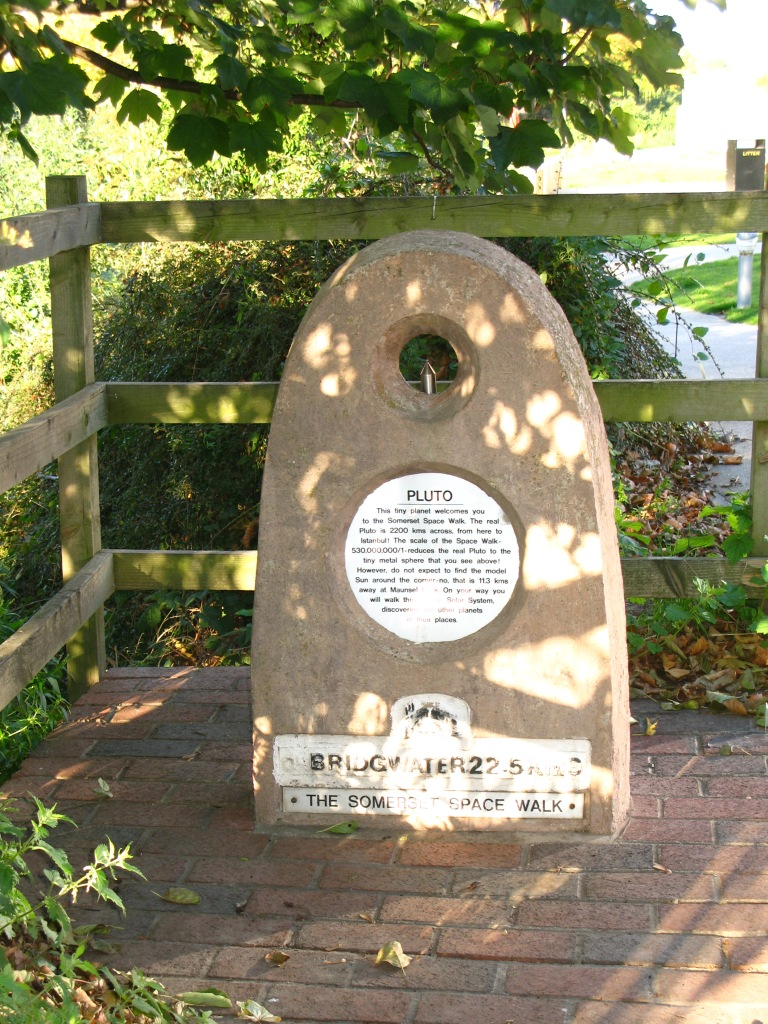
Pluto

== See also ==
- Solar System model
- Sweden Solar System
- Nine Views
