= Planet Lofoten =

Art installation in Norway

Planet Lofoten is a Land Art Installation of the Solar System positioned in the open nature of West Lofoten in Northern Norway.

The Planets are made from stone and range in size from Jupiter at several hundred kilograms to Pluto at only a few grams, and ranges within an area of 30 kilometres (19 mi) from the village of Reine in Moskenes Municipality to the village of Nordland in Værøy Municipality. The Sun is still in the construction process and will be a 7-metre (23 ft) diameter sphere made from steel circles, and will be placed at Reine in Lofoten.

The scale of Planet Lofoten is 1:200 million.

The artist Jan Wanggaard says about the project that he intend nothing with the installation other than letting it stay there and maybe inspire people who bump into it in one or the other way ‒ as an artistic expression or a nice tool to help understand the size and proportions of the Solar System that we all live in.

The documentary film Alt Flyter (Panta Rei) by Lars Nilssen follows Wanggaard during the realization process of Planet Lofoten over a period of three years.

The documentary won Award for Creativity at FIFA, the world's biggest Art Film Festival In Montreal, Canada in 2007 and has since then been shown at several galleries around the world including The Louvre.

== See also ==
- Solar System model - A list of similar Solar System models.
