= Akaa Solar System Scale Model =

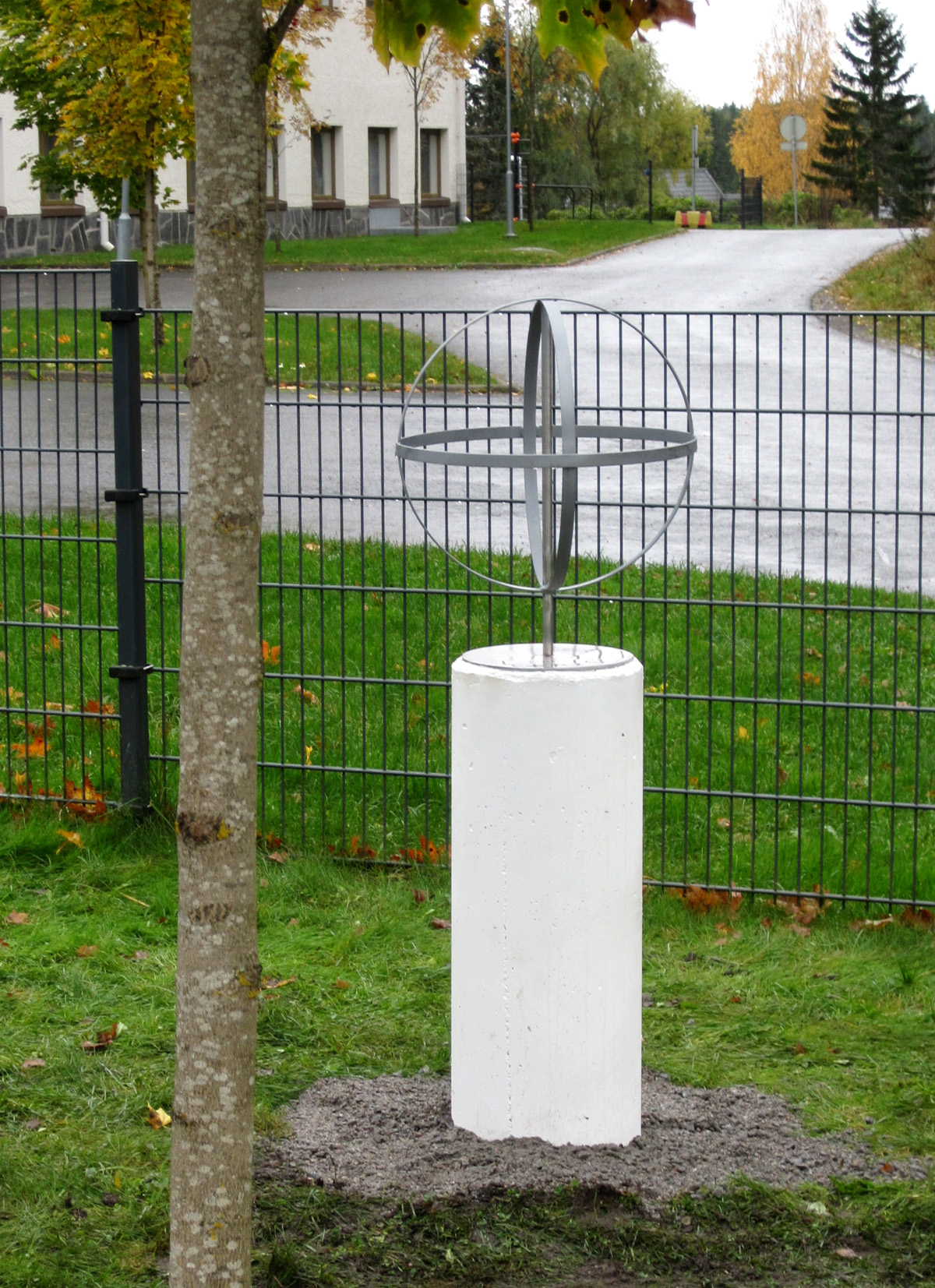
The Sun at Toijalan Yhteiskoulu -school.

Akaa Solar System Scale Model is located at the center of the city of Akaa, Finland. The Sun is located at the school campus of Toijalan Yhteiskoulu in Toijala district. The scale of the model is 1 : 3000000000, meaning that each centimetre in the scale model represents 30000 km in real life. The Sun is 464 mm in diameter and the Earth is 4 mm in diameter and located 49.86 meters away from the Sun. Neptune is 1500 meters away from the Sun, for example. Akaa Solar System Scale Model was built in 2017 by amateur astronomer Kari-Pekka Arola.

A walking tour of Akaa Solar System Scale Model starts from the Sun and all the planets are located northbound from the Sun. The walking route goes through the center of Toijala and towards the port of Toijala, where the furthest dwarf planet in the scale model, Eris is located. All the planets and most notable dwarf planets are included in the scale model. The current location (140 AU) of the Voyager 1 spacecraft in relation to the Solar System is also presented in the scale model (as the most distant man-made spacecraft) and the concrete pillar representing its location is at the center of the neighbouring town Viiala, approximately 7 km away from the Sun.

The speed of light in the scale model is exactly 10 cm/second, so walking the 50-meter distance from the Earth to Sun "at light speed" takes 8 minutes and 20 seconds.

== Scale model of Proxima Centauri in Australia ==
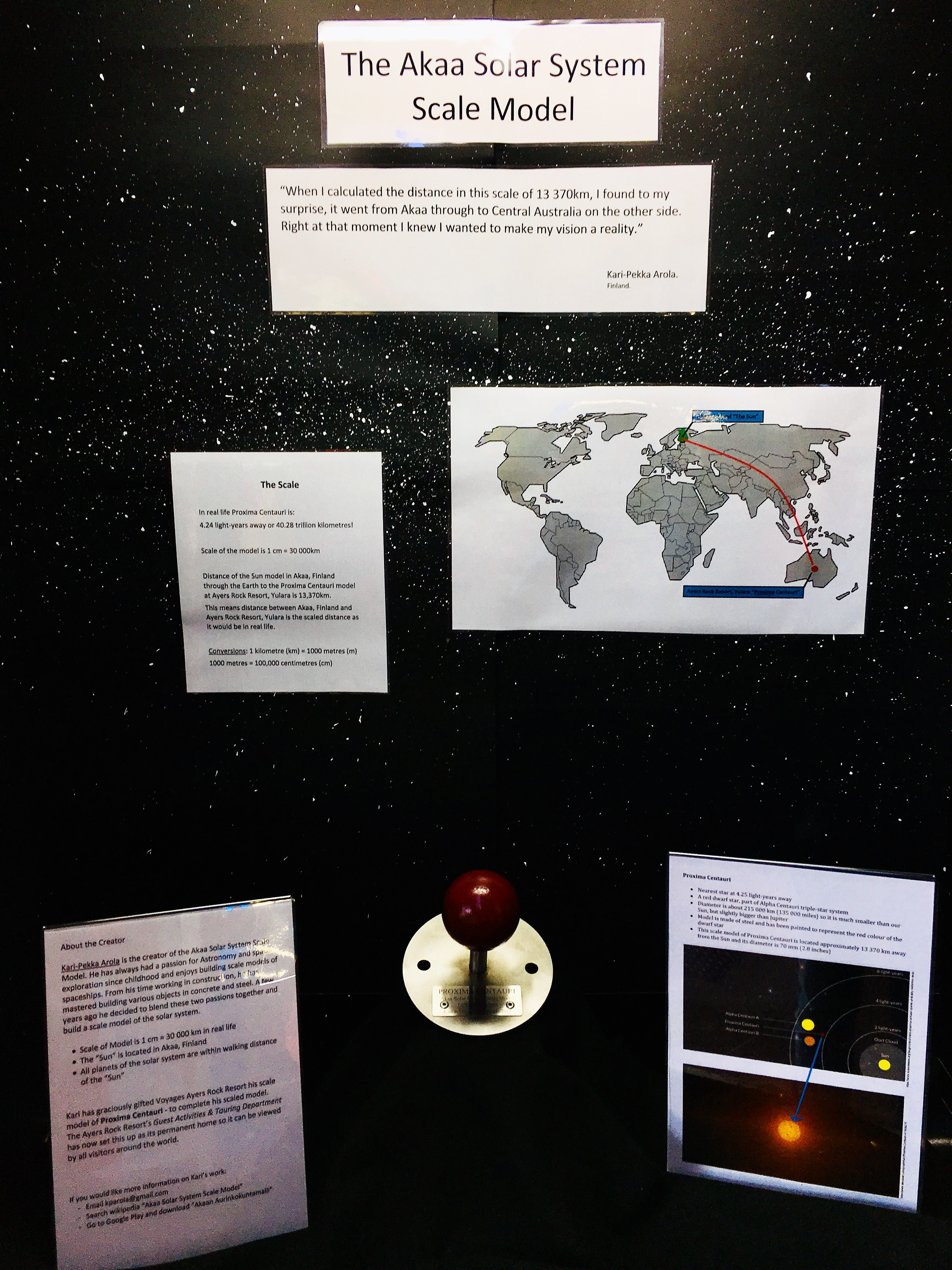
The scale model of Proxima Centauri in Yulara, Australia.

In 2018 scale model of the star Proxima Centauri was added to Akaa Solar System Scale Model. Proxima Centauri is a red dwarf star and the nearest star to the Solar System. It is located 4.24 light-years away. Within the model's scale, it has a diameter of about 72 mm and is located 13370 km away from Akaa. This ground distance takes it in the Northern Territory of Australia and near the famous Uluru / Ayers Rock. The scale model of Proxima Centauri is placed at the nearby town of Yulara in the Town Square visitor centre. This addition of Proxima Centauri demonstrates the differences of planetary distances vs. the stellar distances in the universe.

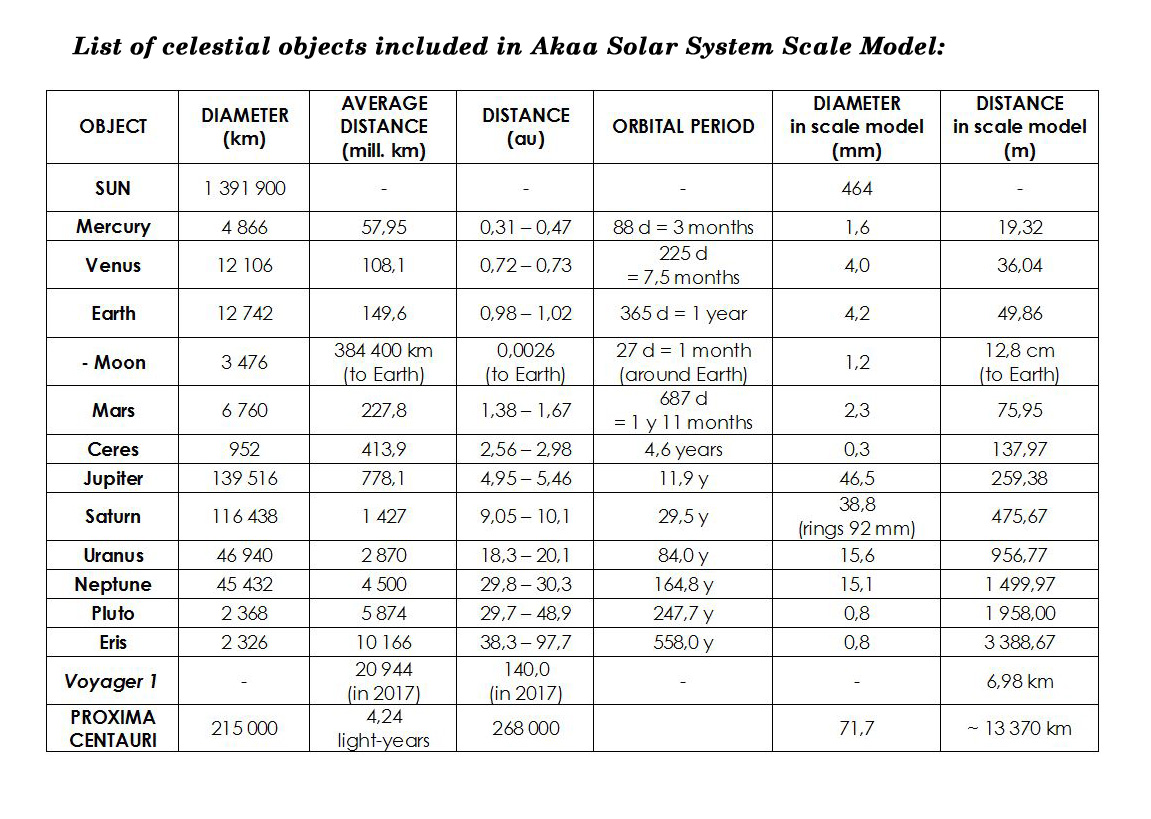
List of objects included in Akaa Solar System Scale Model.

A map and info of the walking tour is available at the website of the city of Akaa.

Free info app "Akaa Solar System Scale Model" is also available at Google Play Store.

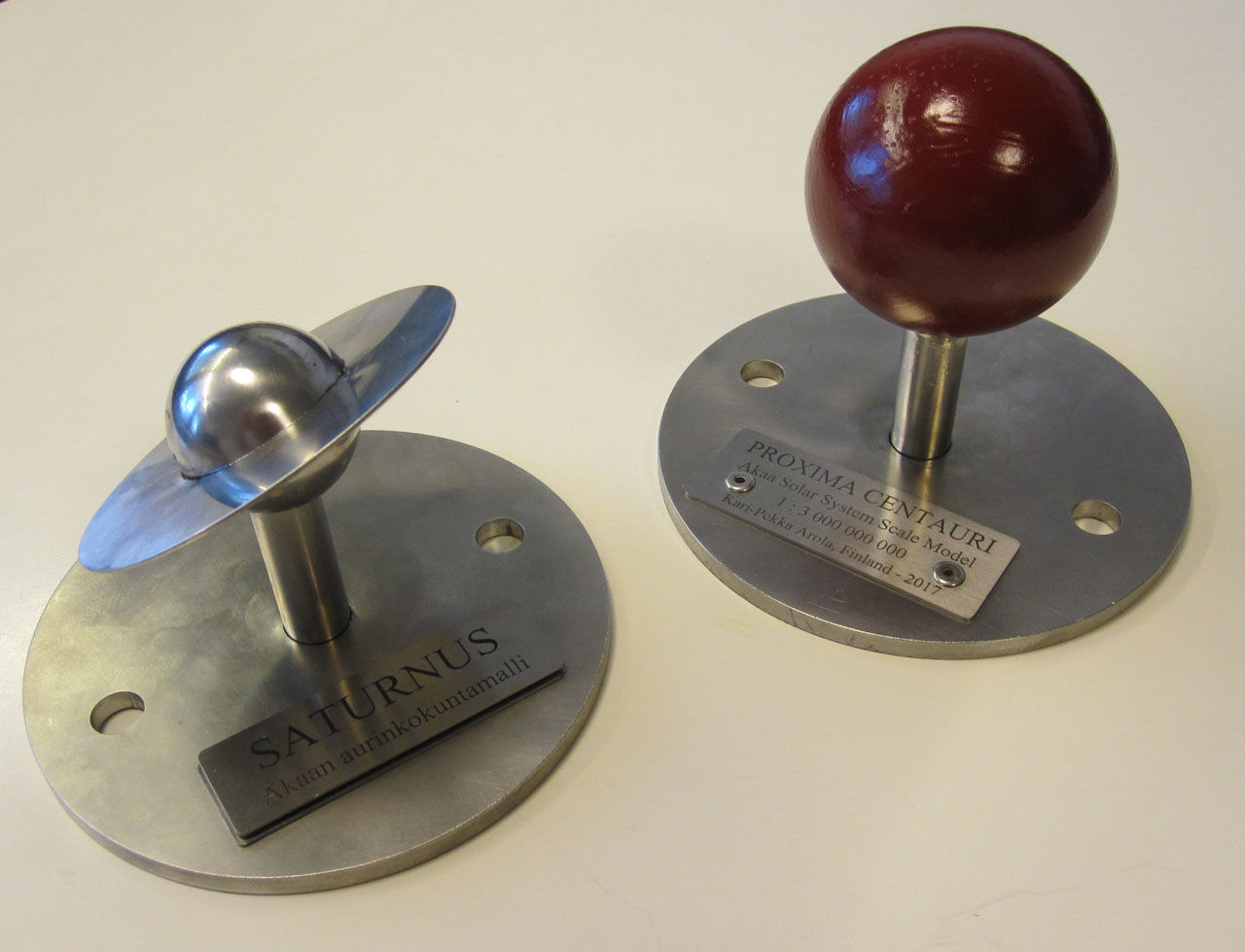
Scale models of Saturn and Proxima Centauri.

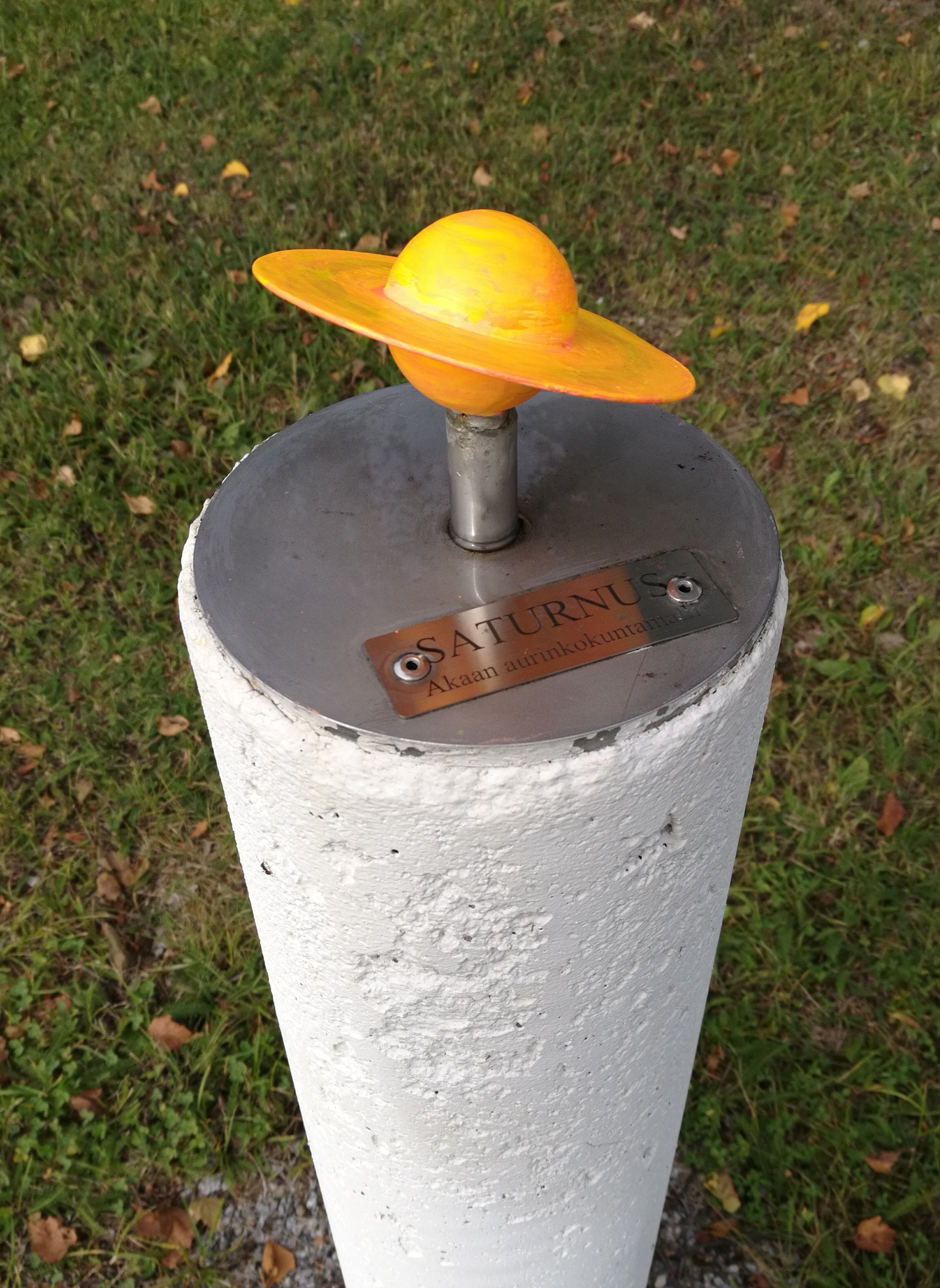
Saturn of Akaa Solar System Scale Model.

== See also ==
- Solar System model

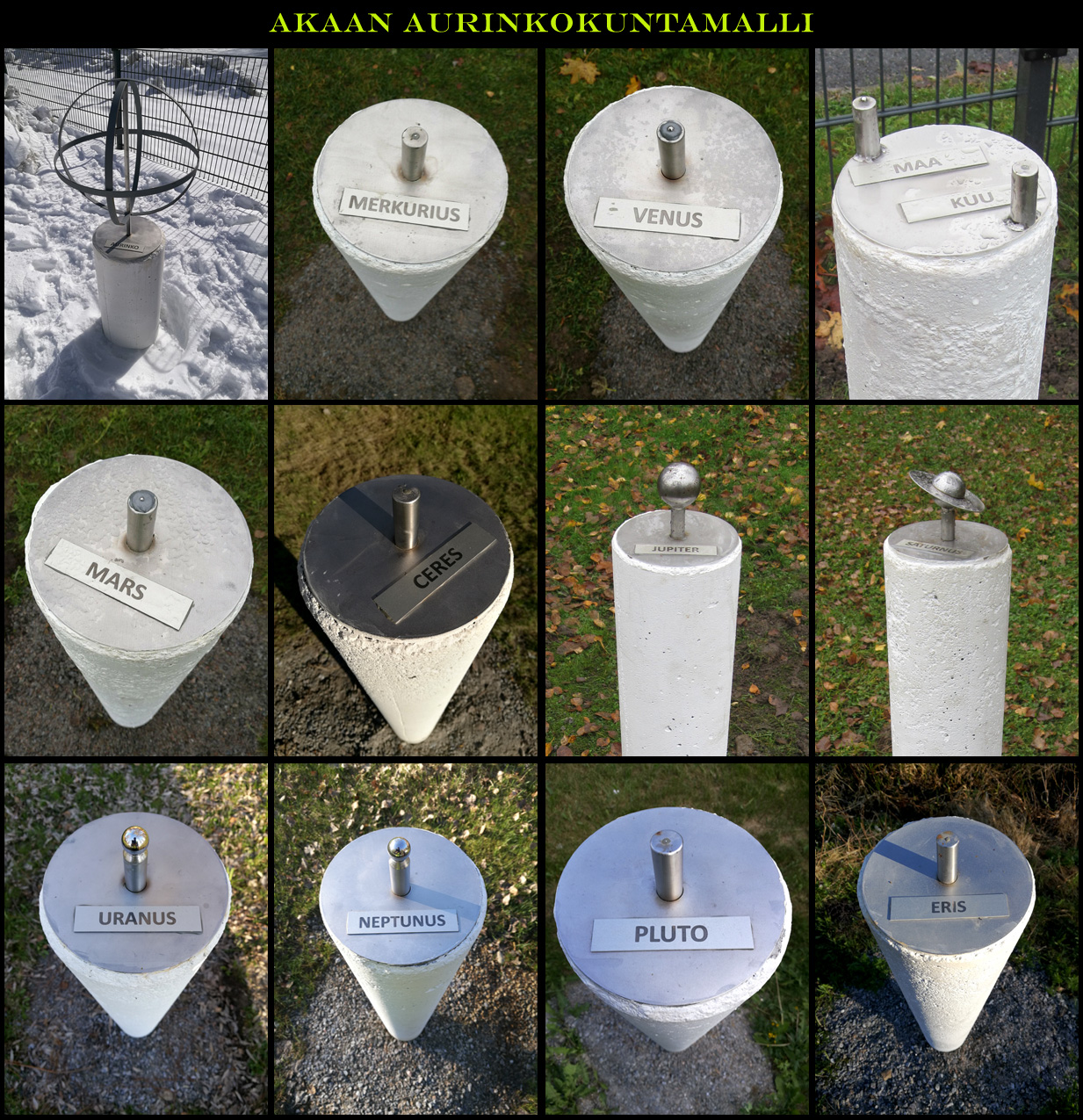
Akaa Solar System Scale Model Monuments.
