= Thomas Hughes (disambiguation) =

Thomas Hughes (1822–1896) was an English lawyer, author, and member of parliament (MP) for Lambeth, and for Frome.

Thomas, Tom, or Tommy Hughes may also refer to:

== Arts and entertainment ==
- Thomas Hughes (dramatist) (fl. 1571–1623), 16th-century English dramatist and lawyer
- T. Rowland Hughes (1903–1949), Welsh novelist, dramatist and poet
- Tom Hughes (actor) (born 1985), English actor
- Tom Hughes (a.k.a. R.U. Slime, fl. 1990s), author of Gooflumps book series
- Tom Hughes (radio host) (fl. 2000s), American radio personality
- Tom Hughes (As the World Turns), fictional character on American soap opera As the World Turns

== Law and politics ==
- Thomas Hughes (Welsh MP) (1604–1664), Welsh politician, MP for Monmouthshire, and for Carmarthenshire
- Thomas H. Hughes (1769–1839), U.S. representative from New Jersey
- Thomas Hughes (Sydney mayor) (1863–1930), lord mayor of Sydney, Australia
- Thomas Hughes (Australian politician) (1892–1980), Australian state Labor MP in Western Australia
- T. A. Hughes (Thomas A. Hughes, fl. 1910s), American politician from Arizona
- Tom Hughes (Australian politician) (1923–2024), member of the Australian House of Representatives and Attorney-General
- Thomas L. Hughes (1925–2023), American government officer
- Tom Hughes (Oregon politician) (born 1943), Metro Council president and former mayor of Hillsboro, Oregon
- Sir Thomas Raffles Hughes (1856–1938), British barrister

== Religion ==
- Thomas Hughes (priest, born 1818), (1818–1876), British-born Anglican priest in Canada
- Thomas Hughes (priest, born 1838) (1838–1911), British missionary with the Church Missionary Society
- Thomas P. Hughes (bishop) (1891–1957), Irish-born Roman Catholic priest in Nigeria
- Thomas Hughes (bishop) (1895–1981), Welsh Anglican priest
- Thomas Bayley Hughes (1916–1988), Welsh Anglican priest

== Science and medicine ==
- Thomas McKenny Hughes (1832–1917), Welsh geologist
- Thomas P. Hughes (historian) (1923–2014), American historian of technology
- Thomas J.R. Hughes (born 1943), American professor of aerospace engineering

== Sports ==
=== Association football (soccer) ===
- Thomas Bridges Hughes (1851–1940), English footballer
- Tom Hughes (footballer) (1892–1915), English footballer
- Tommy Hughes (footballer, born 1947), Scottish football goalkeeper
- Tommy Hughes (footballer, born 2000), English footballer for Ipswich Town

=== Baseball ===
- Tom Hughes (pitcher, born 1878) (1878–1956), American baseball player
- Tom Hughes (pitcher, born 1884) (1884–1961), American baseball player for the New York Highlanders and Boston Braves
- Tom Hughes (outfielder) (1907–1989), American baseball player for the Detroit Tigers
- Tommy Hughes (baseball) (1919–1990), American baseball player for the Philadelphia Phillies and Cincinnati Reds
- Tom Hughes (1950s pitcher) (1934–2019), American baseball player for the St. Louis Cardinals

=== Other sports ===
- Thomas Hughes (cricketer) (1825–1887), English cricketer and diplomat
- Tommy Hughes (Australian footballer) (1886–1981), Australian rules footballer
- Tommy Hughes (runner) (born 1960), Irish long-distance runner
- Tommy Hughes (runner, born 1958), American runner, 1977 All-American for the Indiana Hoosiers track and field team
- Tom Hughes (hurdler) (born 1933), American hurdler, 1953 and 1954 All-American for the Purdue Boilermakers track and field team

== Others ==
- Thomas Smart Hughes (1786–1847), English historian
- Thomas Hughes (VC) (1885–1942), Irish soldier in British Army; Victoria Cross recipient
- Thomas Hughes (1888–1914), British soldier who sent a message in a bottle that was recovered in 1999
- Thomas Edwin Hughes (1830–1919), American real estate developer of Fresno, California

== See also ==
- Hughes (surname)
