= Cultural depictions of Belshazzar =

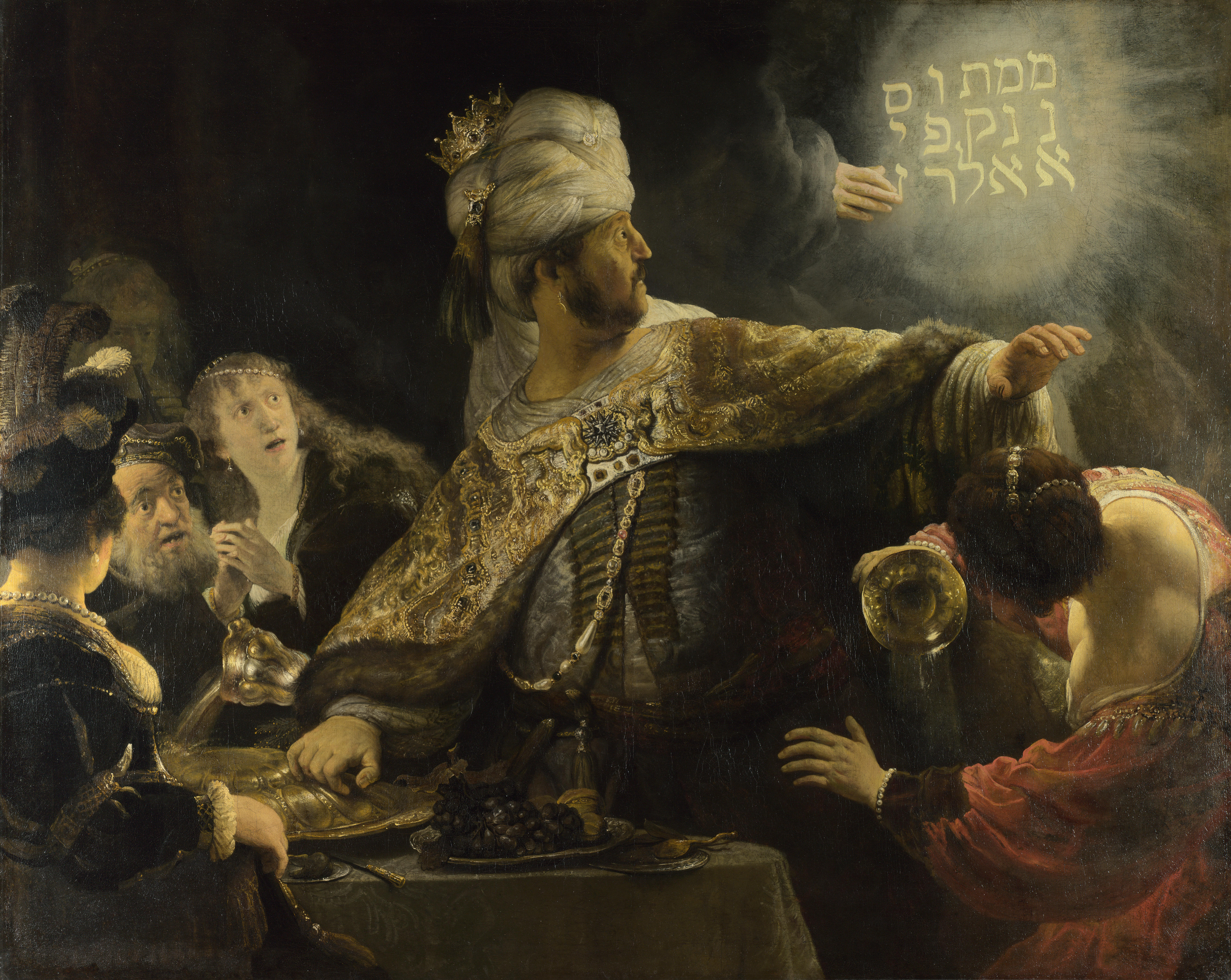
Belshazzar's Feast by Rembrandt, c. 1635

Belshazzar (6th century BC), son of the last king of the Neo-Babylonian empire, Nabonidus, has inspired many works of art and cultural allusions, often with a religious motif. While a historical figure, depictions and portrayals of him are most often based on his appearance in the biblical story of Belshazzar's feast in the Book of Daniel. This story is the origin of the idiomatic expression "the writing is on the wall".

== Idiomatic expressions ==
=== The writing is on the wall ===
In chapter 5 in the Book of Daniel, a hand writes Hebrew letters on a wall, which Daniel interprets as "Mene, mene, tekel, upharsin". These words mean that Belshazzar is doomed. The phrase "The writing is on the wall", or "The writing on the wall", has become an idiomatic expression referring to the foreshadowing of any impending doom, misfortune, or end. If "the writing is on the wall" something bad is about to happen. A person who does not or refuses to see "the writing on the wall" is being described as ignorant to the signs of a cataclysmic event that will likely occur in the near future. One of the earliest known uses of the phrase in English is in the writings of a Captain L. Brinckmair in 1638, during the Thirty Years' War. Brinckmair writes: "Remarkable Prodigies..are in themselves like the writing on the Wall in Beshazzars Palace, which Sooth-sayers, Astrologians, and Chaldeans could neither understand nor reade’."

=== Mene! Mene! Tekel Upharsin! ===
The untranslated quote from Daniel 5:25 "Mene! Mene! Tekel Upharsin!" is also used, particularly in older sources about war and politics, such as political cartoons and newspapers. It is occasionally shortened to "Mene, Tekel".

One of the most widely published examples of the phrase is from Palestine in 1947. Shortly before midnight on 21 April 1947, Meir Feinstein or Moshe Barazani wrote "Mene! Mene! Tekel Upharsin!" on the walls of their shared death row cell in Jerusalem Central Prison in British-controlled Palestine, shortly before they then blew themselves to pieces. Their deaths are also commonly associated with another Bible quote – let me die with the Philistines – the words of Samson from Judges 16:30. Their suicide plan was named after Samson's suicide. They made an unsuccessful last minute appeals for clemency after their families begged them to forsake their "martyrs' role".

== Visual arts ==
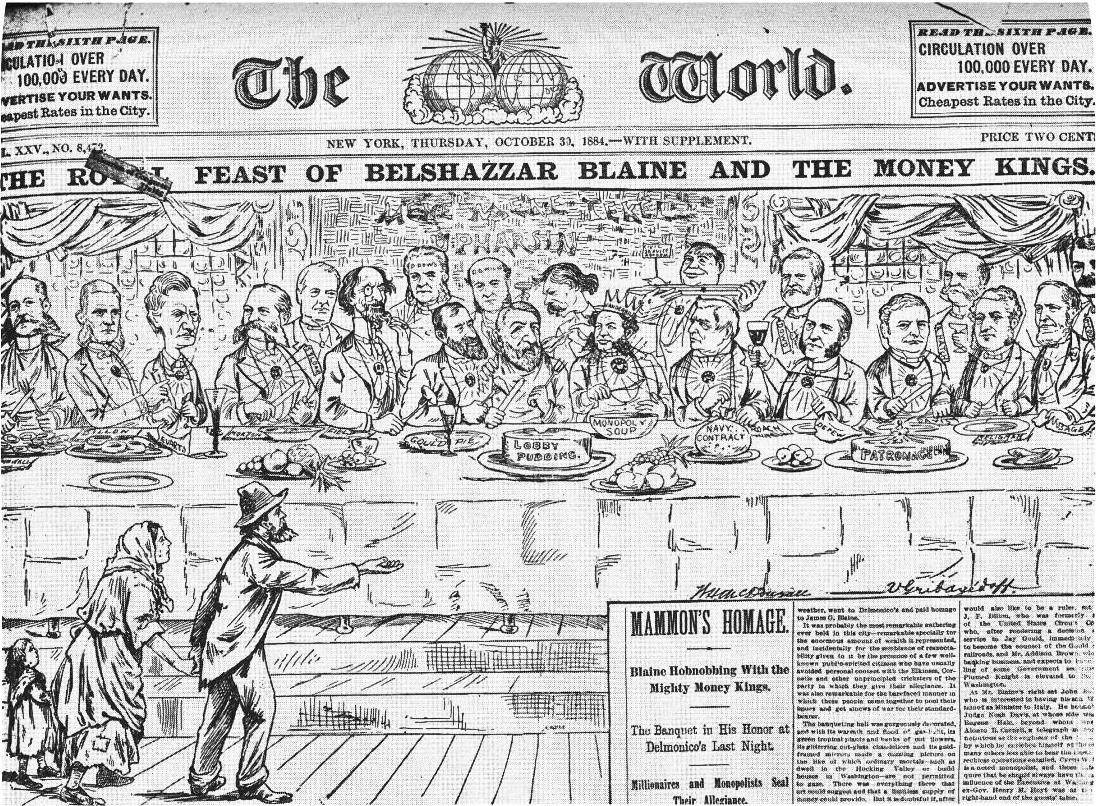
The Royal Feast of Belshazzar Blaine and the Money Kings, illustrated by Walt McDougall and Valerian Gribayedoff. Political cartoon parodying James G. Blaine with his wealthy donors feasting at a table at Delmonico's while a poor family begs beneath. Originally printed in New York World, October 30, 1884.

- Belshazzar's Feast is a painting by Rembrandt created around 1635.
- Belshazzar's Feast is a painting by John Martin from c. 1821.
- In The Hand-Writing upon the Wall (1803), James Gillray caricatured Napoleon in the role of Belshazzar.
- Belshazzar's Feast is a painting by Washington Allston from 1817–1843.
- During the 1884 United States presidential campaign, Republican candidate James G. Blaine dined at a New York City restaurant with some wealthy business executives including Cornelius Vanderbilt, Jay Gould, etc. This was featured in newspapers, with a caricature titled "Royal Feast of Belshazzar Blaine and the Money Kings".
- Belshazzar's Feast, the Writing on Your Wall is an installation artwork by Susan Hiller, 1983–1984.
- The scene of Belshazzar's feast was sometimes used in political satire illustrations.

== Music ==
George Frideric Handel wrote the oratorio Belshazzar in 1744

- The Play of Daniel (Ludus Danielis), believed to have been first performed in the 12th century, and written by students at the school of Beauvais Cathedral. It includes elements from the Book of Daniel, including the feast.
- The oratorio Belshazzar by George Frideric Handel, with libretto by Charles Jennens. Written in 1744.
- The opera Ciro in Babilonia, ossia La caduta di Baldassare (Cyrus in Babylon, or The Downfall of Belshazzar) by Gioachino Rossini, first performed in 1812. Based on the Book of Daniel.
- Belsatzar, an 1840 ballad written by Robert Schumann to the words of the poet Heinrich Heine, inspired by the Book of Daniel.
- Belshazzar's Feast by George Frederick Root. A cantata based on the biblical text, published in 1860.
- Belshazzar's Feast (Belsazars gästabud), op. 51, by Jean Sibelius composed in 1906. Incidental music to Hjalmar Procopé's play with the same name.
- Belshazzar's Feast by William Walton, composed in 1931. An oratorio based on the biblical text.
- The 1937 musical Pins and Needles added Harold Rome's song "Mene, Mene, Tekel" in 1939. The song is based on the Book of Daniel and described as "Rome's musical send-up of bellicose dictators".
- Johnny Cash wrote a gospel song about and named Belshazzar, first recorded in 1957. The song is included on the album The Original Sun Sound of Johnny Cash (1964).
- Wormwood: Curious Stories from the Bible, a 1998 album by The Residents, includes the song "God's Magic Finger". The song tells of the feast.

== Theatre and literature ==
Belshazzar had a letter —
He never had but one —
Belshazzar's Correspondent
Concluded and begun
In that immortal Copy
The Conscience of us all
Can read without its Glasses
On revelation's wall—
—Emily Dickinson, 1879

- The fourteenth-century poem Cleanness by the Pearl Poet recounts the feast and subsequent events as a warning against spiritual impurity.
- In William Shakespeare's The Merchant of Venice (written between 1596 and 1599), Portia disguises herself as a lawyer's apprentice and calls herself Balthazar (in Act IV, scene i), alluding to the Biblical Belshazzar.
- Belshazzar's Feast (La cena del rey Baltasar, 17th century), an auto sacramental by Pedro Calderon de la Barca.
- In 1720 Jonathan Swift wrote "'Tis like the writing on the wall" in the poem "The Run Upon the Bankers", using the idiom.
- Lord Byron's poem "Vision of Belshazzar" from Hebrew Melodies (1815) includes both the feast and Daniel's pronunciation.
- The poem Belsatzar or Belsazar by Heinrich Heine is based on the feast. It appears in the collection Buch der Lieder ("Book of Songs", 1827).
- "Mene, Tekel, Upharsin" and Belshazzar is mentioned in Alexandre Dumas' The Count of Monte Cristo (1844) in connection with Gérard de Villefort having one of his long past crimes come to light.
- In chapter 99 of Herman Melville's novel Moby-Dick (1851), the first mate Starbuck murmur to himself "The old man seems to read Belshazzar's awful writing" as he spies Captain Ahab speaking to the doubloon he had nailed to the mast of the Pequod.
- Emily Dickinson's poem "Belshazzar had a letter" from The Poems of Emily Dickinson is about Belshazzar's divine correspondence. Her poem was written in 1879.
- In the novel Sister Carrie (1900), Theodore Dreiser entitles a chapter "The Feast of Belshazar – A Seer to Translate" in which the gluttony of turn-of-the-century New York City is highlighted.
- Belshazzar's Feast (Belsazars gästabud), a play from 1906 by the Swedish-speaking Finnish writer Hjalmar Procopé, based on the feast.
- Belshazzar is a 1930 novel by H. Rider Haggard. In it, the Egyptian Ramose's sister is sent as a gift to Belshazzar, and the feast is part of the plot.
- In H. P. Lovecraft's novella The Shadow Over Innsmouth (written 1931, published 1936), the character Zadok Allen says "Mene, mene, tekel, upharsin", a reference to the Book of Daniel.
- Robert Frost's poem "The Bearer of Evil Tidings" (1936), is about a messenger headed to Belshazzar's court to deliver the news of the king's imminent overthrow. Remembering that evil tidings were a "dangerous thing to bear," the messenger flees to the Himalayas rather than facing the monarch's wrath.
- In Wallace Stevens' poem "Country Words" (1937) the poet sings a canto to Belshazzar and wants him "reading right".
- In Fazil Iskander's novel Sandro of Chegem (1983), one of the chapters depicting a dinner involving an Abkhazian dance ensemble and Joseph Stalin is titled "Belshazzar's Feast". The story was filmed in 1989.

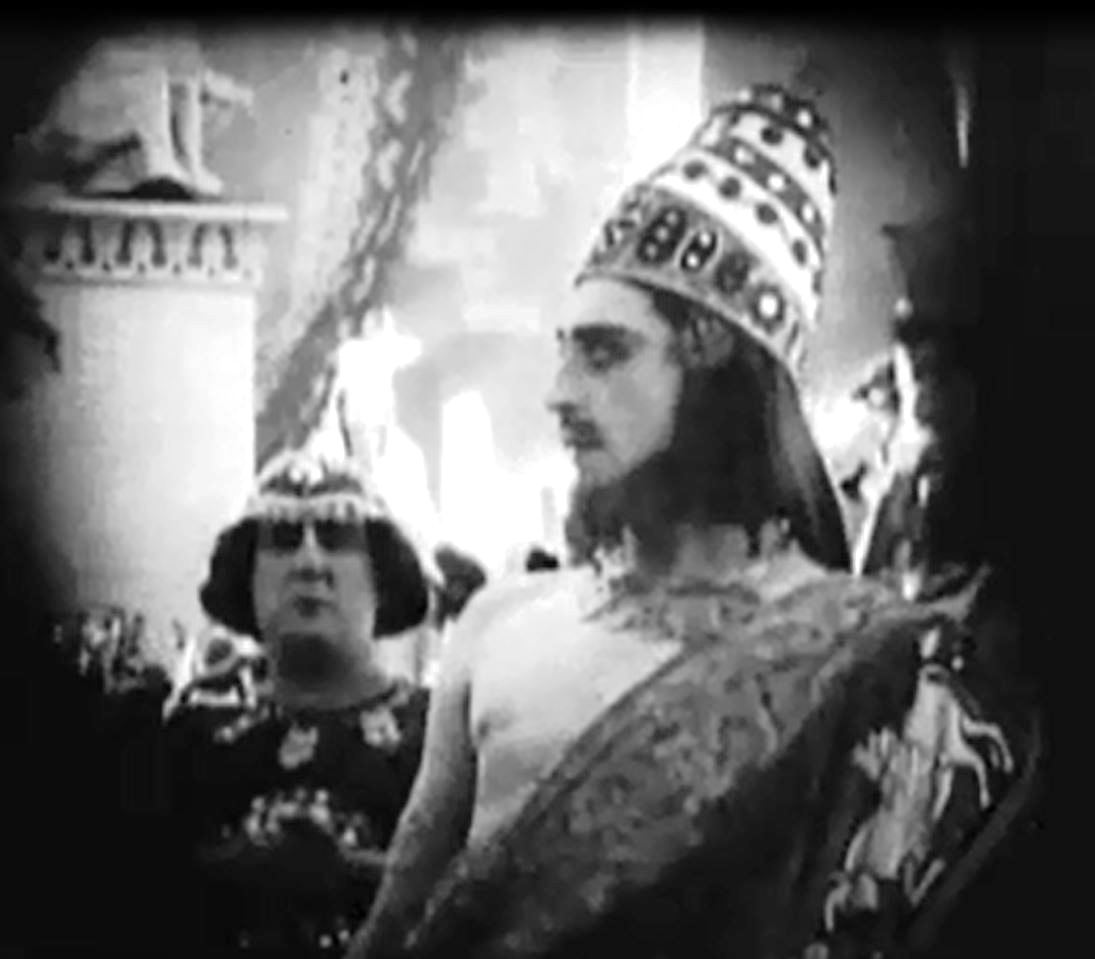
Alfred Paget as Belshazzar.

=== Film and television ===
- Belshazzar is portrayed by Alfred Paget in D. W. Griffith's film Intolerance from 1916.
- Belshazzar is played by Michael Ansara in the 1953 William Castle film Slaves of Babylon.
