= William P. Sims =

American politician

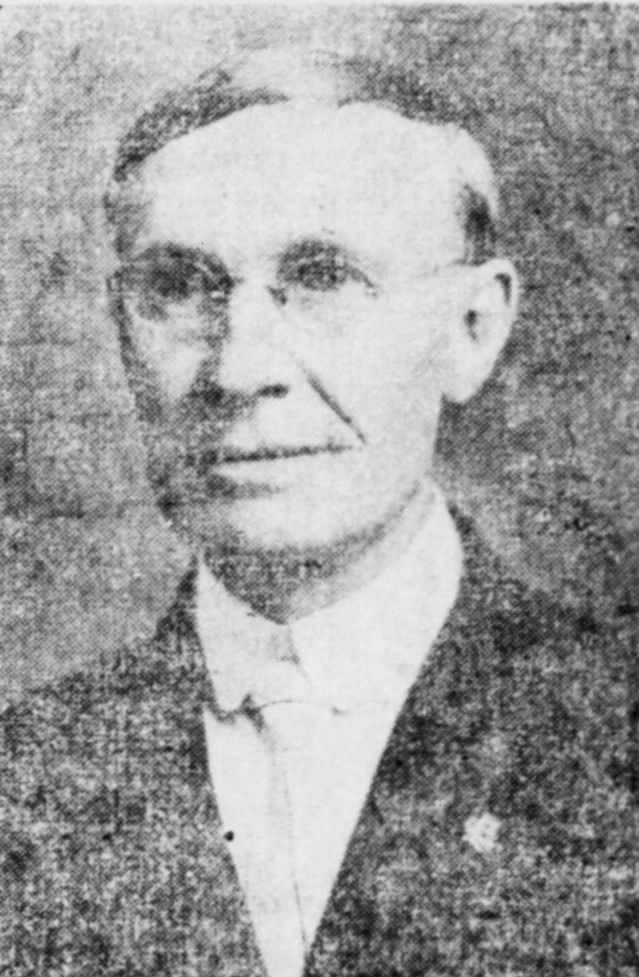
- W. P. Sims in 1920

Member of the Arizona Senate from the Cochise County district
- In office March 1912 – January 1916
- Preceded by: First Senator from Cochise County
- Succeeded by: C. M. Roberts; Fred Sutter

Member of the Arizona Senate from the Cochise County district
- In office January 1921 – January 1927
- Preceded by: T. A. Hughes; D. C. O'Neil
- Succeeded by: Fred Sutter

Personal details
- Born: 1875 Tennessee
- Died: April 17, 1951 (aged 75–76) Phoenix, Arizona
- Party: Democratic
- Spouse: Mary
- Profession: Politician

William Prescott Sims (1875 – April 17, 1951)) was a politician and dentist from Arizona. He served in Arizona State Senate in the 1st, 2nd, and 5th - 7th State Legislatures. He served as the President of the Senate during the 2nd Legislature.

== Life ==
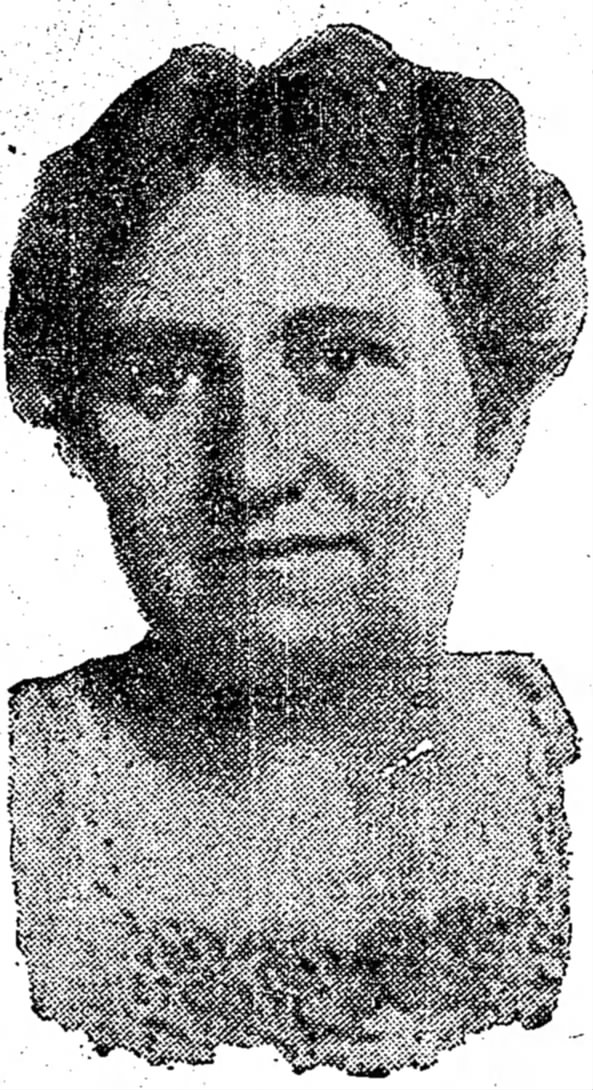
Mary Sims

Sims was born in Tennessee in 1875. He was a graduate of Vanderbilt University. He was a professor of dentistry at the University of Tennessee prior to his move to Arizona. In Tennessee he served as the treasurer of the Tennessee Dental Society, and as president of the Nashville Dental Society. He was also selected as the state chairman of the Tennessee delegation to the Fourth International Dental Congress, held in St. Louis, Missouri.

Sims relocated from Nashville, Tennessee to Bisbee, Arizona in April 1905, setting up his dental practice in the Bank of Bisbee building. Upon his arrival, the Territorial Governor, Governor Kibbey, appointed him to the territory's Dental Board of Examiners, where he became its treasurer and secretary. Two years earlier, he had acquired the deeds to the Bulldog and Omaha mines from Ed Gillespie for a sum of $2000. He was joined by his wife the following month. Shortly after his arrival, Sims became embroiled in a land ownership controversy. He was accused of "lot jumping", when he filed claims on 15 lots which had been purchased by the J.E. Thompson Company. However, according to the law, if improvements of more than $100 were not completed within a certain timeframe, the lots reverted to the city, and could be picked up by any interested party. Sims alleged that the prerequisite improvements had not been done on 15 of the 25 claims purchased by Thompson. However, the town trustee ruled in favor of Thompson, after which Sims appealed the decision to the District Court. The case would eventually be set to be heard on June 18, 1906.

A year after their arrival in Bisbee, Sims and his wife hosted a musical club in their home on Thursday evenings, called "The Cecelian". The Sims had two sons, W. James Ross Sims, and William P. Sims Jr. The younger son, William, attended the U.S. Naval Academy. In October 1906, Sims was stricken with typhoid, but recovered within several weeks.

In 1910, Sims was elected the vice-president of the Arizona Dental Association, and in 1912 he became the association's president. In 1913, due his duties in the state senate, Sims resigned from the Dental Board of Examiners. After leaving the State Senate, Sims was once again appointed to the Dental Board.

In 1918, he was one of twenty-one executives of the mining industry arrested as the result of a federal grand jury, as part of the I.W.W. deportation suit. The men were charged violating the civil rights of mining workers by having them deported out of Arizona. During preliminary hearings it was established that Sims, along with William White acted as armed guards during the deportation round-ups. The case never went to trial, as it was dismissed in state court as the result of a pre-trial motion. The Federal prosecutors appealed to the U.S. Supreme Court, but their appeal was ruled against in an 8-1 ruling.

On New Year's Eve 1920, in an ironic twist, Sims' Ford roadster was stolen while he was giving a speech on law enforcement. Sims retired from dentistry in 1922, selling his practice to his partner, W. J. Johnson. In 1926, the Sims moved from Bisbee to Phoenix.

Sims was also part owner of the Bowen-Sims Auto Company, which was the Studebaker distributor in Arizona. He and his partner, John Bowen, purchased the company located in Tucson in June 1926. He divested himself from the company in 1929. His portion of the company was purchased by A. W. Maxwell, who was a well-known Studebaker dealer in Los. Subsequent to the sale, the company was renamed, "Bowen-Maxwell". However, after selling his share in the company, Sims was hired as the president of the organization.

His wife, Mary, died on April 27, 1948, from a stroke at the age of 75. She had been attending a luncheon at the YWCA, where she had been a past president, when she suffered the stroke. She was taken to Good Samaritan Hospital, where she died two hours later.

Sims died at his home after a long illness on April 17, 1951. He was 76.

== Political career ==
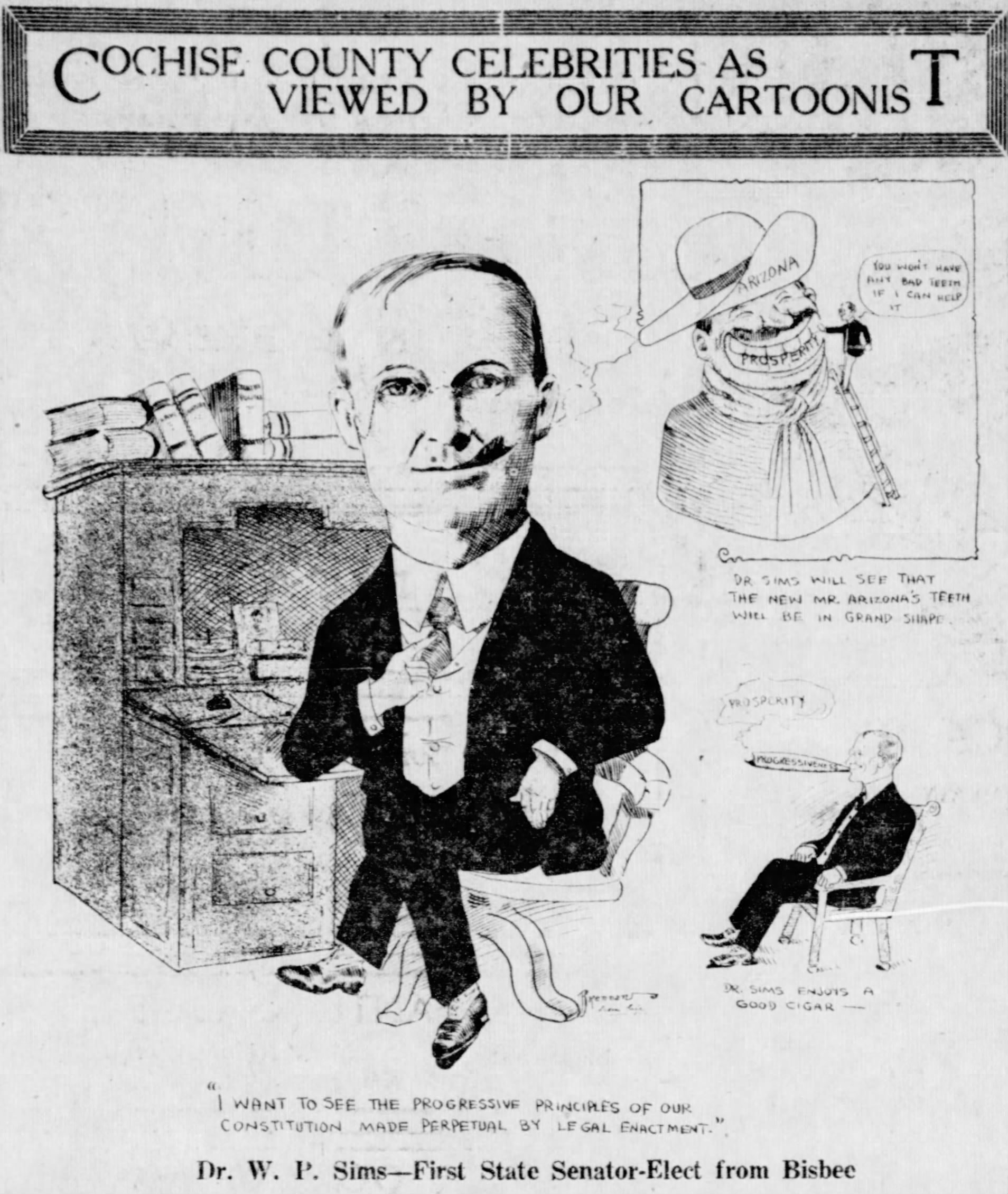
Hubbell 1912 political cartoon

In September 2011 Sims announced that he would be running for the State Senate as one of two seats in Cochise County. In October it was announced that he would be seeking the Democrat nomination for Secretary of State. However, this appears not to have been the case, since Sims did not appear on the ballot as a candidate for Secretary in the October 1911 Democratic primary. In that primary, he was listed as a candidate for state senator, and he came in second to C. M. Roberts in total votes, 1145–1043, enabling the two men to run in the General election in December. Both he and Roberts won the 2 Cochise seats in December, making them the first two State Senators from Cochise County. The legislature was only supposed to be in session from March 12, 1912, to January 1, 1913, but in July 2012 the State Supreme Court ruled that holding an election in 1913 violated the State Constitution. Therefore, the legislature would remain in office until January 1, 1914. Sims came forward and called for a special session of the legislature in order to deal with the ramifications of the court's decision. In the second special session of the 1st Legislature, Sims proposed a bill allowing for the commission-type form of government for Arizona's counties.

The 1914 election saw both Roberts and Sims running for re-election, however, Roberts came in 3rd in the primary, behind a newcomer, William M. Riggs, who led all vote-getters, and Sims. A week after the election, September 15, saw Sims maintaining a 16-vote lead over Roberts, with a single district remaining. That district, West Huachuca, had a total of 24 Democrat votes to be counted. However, when all the votes were tallied the results were Riggs: 2643; Sims: 2107; Roberts: 2099; and Joseph H. Gray 1620. Both Riggs and Sims won the general election in November, which saw the first women to be elected to both the Arizona Senate and Arizona House, Frances Willard Munds and Rachel Berry. When the legislature convened in January 1915, Sims was unanimously elected as President of the Senate, after he was nominated by his chief rival for the position, Morris Goldwater.

Sims did not run for re-election in 1916, although both Riggs and Roberts did. A newcomer, Fred Sutter received the most votes in the primary, while Roberts came in second. While out of the senate, Sims served on the Arizona Corporate Commission.

Sims did not run again in 1918, but once again threw in his hat for Arizona State Senator in the 1920 election, even though he was still embroiled in the I.W.W. trial. He stated that his reason for once again entering politics was the new law on how legislators were compensated, changing from a per diem to a straight salary, as he felt the old system lent itself to some people prolonging legislative sessions simply to receive more remuneration. He was one of the two Democrat candidates who topped the primary, enabling him to run in the November election. In November he was re-elected to his third term in the State Senate.

In August 1922 Sims announced his intention to run for re-election. He was joined by former state senators Roberts, T. A. Hughes, and John P. Cull, as well as political newcomer William Delbridge. Once again, Roberts and Sims won the Democrat primary, and both won by large majorities in the general election in November. When the 6th Legislature met in January, Sims was considered one of the front runners for Senate President. However, when the Democrats caucused on January 8, 1923, they chose Mulford Winsor for president. In August 1924 Sims announced his intention to run for re-election. Sims won re-election, and with newcomer J. B. Wylie, became the two senators from Cochise County. In August 1926 Sims once again filed his intention to run for re-election to the state senate, along with Wylie. However, he was defeated in the primary when Wylie and Fred Sutter were the top two vote getters.

After taking several years off from politics, Sims announced his intention to run once again for the state legislature in 1930, but this time for the House, and from Maricopa County, district 17. Along with Conner Johnson, they won the Democrat primary, but in the general election Johnson was elected, but Sims lost to Republican C. F. Willis. In December 1932, Governor B. B. Moeur appointed Sims as part of a 10-man committee charged with creating a plan to reorganize the state government.

Sims was a supporter of prohibition.
