= Belshazzar (novel) =

Book by Henry Rider Haggard

- Cover of First edition
- Author: H. Rider Haggard
- Language: English
- Publisher: Stanley Paul & Co., Ltd.
- Publication date: 1930
- Publication place: United Kingdom
- Media type: Print (hardcover)
- Pages: 285 pages

Belshazzar is a historical novel by H. Rider Haggard set in Ancient Babylon. It was written in 1924, and was just finished at the time of his death.

== Publication history ==
The novel was published posthumously. It was refused by Haggard's publisher Hutchinson's, and the first U.K. edition was published by Stanley Paul & Co., Ltd., London, in September 1930. It was reissued in 1931.

The first U.S. edition was published by Doubleday, Doran and Co., New York, the same year. A trade paperback edition was issued by Wildside Press in March 2001.

== Plot ==
The Egyptian prince Ramose seeks to rescue his wife Myra from the King of Babylon. The novel also features the Babylon king Belshazzar, and incorporates the Biblical episode of Belshazzar's feast into its plot.

== Reception ==
The Sydney Morning Herald, reviewing the novel, stated that "Rider Haggard was not in his best vein when he wrote this". It added "The field is wide and the possibilities are tremendous when we are taken to the great Babylonian city, and he is a little disappointing in the picture painting when the description of its magnificence is called for".

== See also ==
- Cultural depictions of Belshazzar
