= D. C. O'Neil =

American politician from Arizona

Member of the Arizona House of Representatives
- In office January 1917 – December 1918
- Constituency: Cochise County

Member of the Arizona Senate from the Cochise County district
- In office January 1919 – December 1920
- Preceded by: Fred Sutter; C. M. Roberts
- Succeeded by: W. P. Sims; John P. Cull

Personal details
- Party: Democratic
- Profession: Politician

David C. O'Neil was an American politician from Arizona. He served a single term in the Arizona State House of Representatives during the 3rd Arizona State Legislature, and a single term in the Arizona State Senate during the 4th Arizona State Legislature. He served 13 years on the Arizona State Tax Commission, six of them as chairman. He was appointed in 1934 to serve the last year of an unexpired term, then was re-elected twice, in 1934 and 1940. Early in his career he worked in the hospitality and transportation industries.

== Biography ==
O'Neil was born on December 29, 1881, in Clifton, Illinois. O'Neil was a graduate of Marquette University. After graduating college, he went to Cananea, in northern Sonora, where he ran a restaurant and worked for the Southern Pacific Railroad. He moved to Arizona in 1905, settling in Patagonia, and two years later began working for the Alvarado Gold Mining Company. He moved to Tucson to work as a bookkeeper for the Eagle Milling Company, and then went on to Benson where he managed the Mansion Hotel, before ending up in Douglas as manager of the Gadsden Hotel. In 1908 he moved to Culiacán. By 1911 he had returned to Arizona, residing in Benson, and managing the Mansion hotel.

In 1916 he became one of the charter members of the Douglas council of the Knights of Columbus. In 1916 he started the Motor Transit Company, the first motorized stage company from Bisbee to Douglas. In August 1916 O'Neil was a candidate seeking one of the seven seats from Cochise County in the Arizona House of Representatives, and was one of the seven Democrats selected in the primary. In 1918 he was one of three candidates running in the Democrat's primary for the two seats from Cochise County in the Arizona State Senate. O'Neil and T. A. Hughes, both of whom had served in the House during the previous term, became the Democrat's candidates. O'Neil and Hughes defeated their two Republican opponents.

In 1920 he helped form, and was the first president of, the Arizona Motor Transportation Association. In 1926 the Motor Transit Company was absorbed into Pickwick Stage Lines. After the sale of the Motor Transit Company, he became the Bisbee dealer for Hudson Automobiles. In 1932 he was one of the charter members of the Arizona Chamber of Commerce.

In 1931 he became city clerk and treasurer for Douglas, Arizona. He resigned those posts in February 1934 when he was appointed as one of three members of the Arizona Tax Commission. He was appointed by Governor Moeur to fill the vacancy created by the death of M. A. Murphy, to serve out the remainder of Murphy's term. Murphy's term was due to expire at the end of the year in 1934, while the other two commissioners still had four years remaining on their terms. In May 1934 O'Neil announced his intention to run in the Democrat's primary, seeking a full term on the tax commission. During the primary election in 1934, O'Neil was falsely accused as being part of the Bisbee Deportation event in an attempt to discredit him. The attempt was debunked. He was one of three candidates competing in the Democrat's primary. He won the primary with a comfortable margin of 39,046 to 34,649 over his nearest opponent, Ed Ogelsby. He went on to win by an almost 4–1 margin over his nearest opponent in the general election in November. In February 1937, O'Neil became the chairman of the state tax board through statutory requirements when the current chairman was removed from office by the Arizona Supreme Court.

In 1940 he ran for his second full six-year term on the tax commission. He ran unopposed in the primary, and defeated Republican F. M. Wilkinson in November's general election. When the commission was reconstituted in January 1941, Thad M. Moore became chairman. In 1945, O'Neil once again became chairman of the tax commission. In 1946, O'Neil announced his intention to run for re-election to the tax commission. His opponent in the Democrat primary was former commissioner and Tax Commission chairman Thad Moore. Moore and O'Neil had many political disagreements while they had both served on the tax commission. In a very close race, Moore narrowly defeated O'Neil by 336 votes.

He died on April 6, 1951, from a heart condition in St. Joseph's Hospital in Phoenix. He had been ill for several months, and entered the hospital on March 6. His funeral was held in St. Mary's Church, and he was buried in St. Francis Cemetery.
