= William M. Riggs =

American politician in Arizona

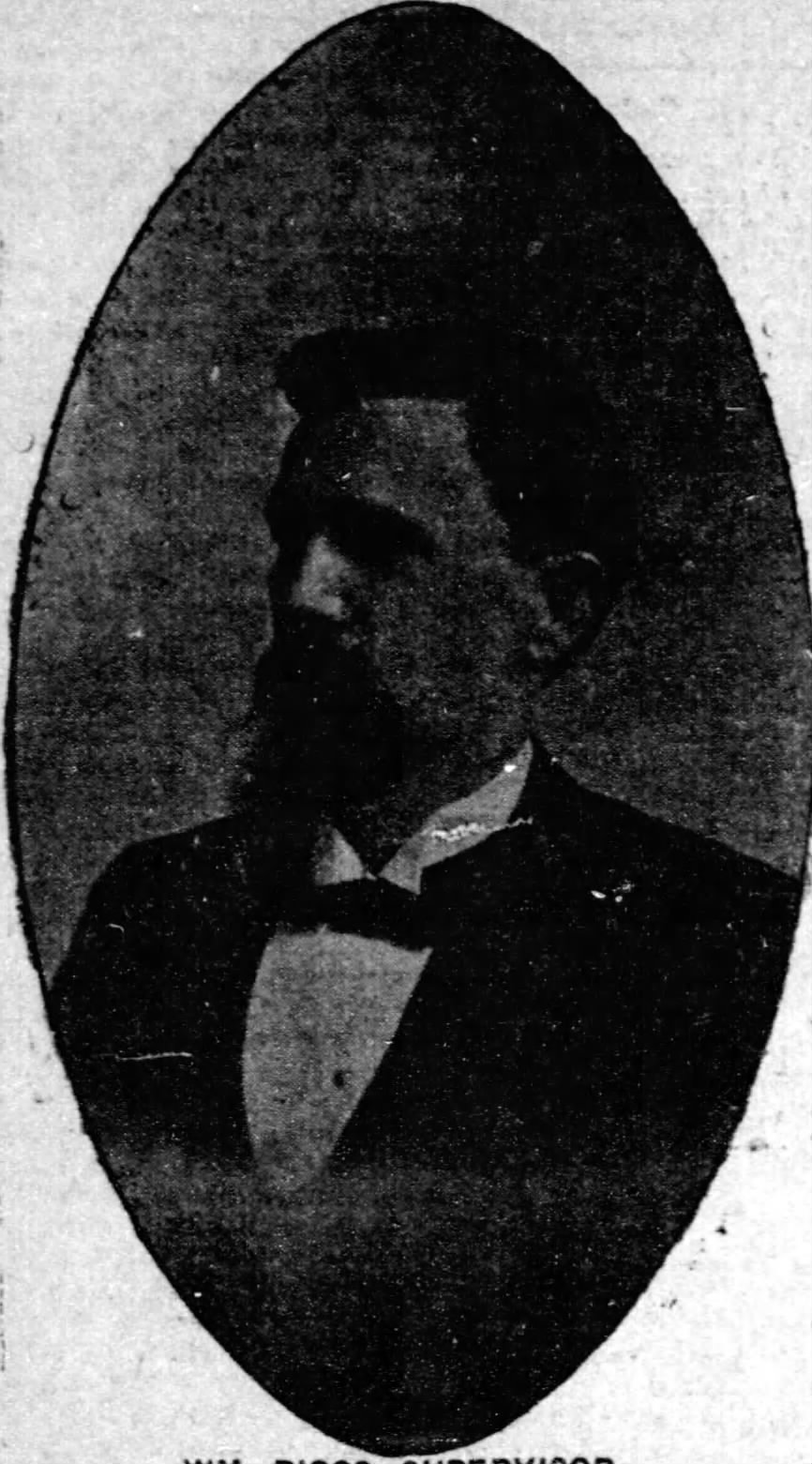
- Riggs in 1906

Member of the Arizona Senate from the Cochise County district
- In office January 1915 – January 1917
- Preceded by: C. M. Roberts
- Succeeded by: Fred Sutter; C. M. Roberts

Personal details
- Born: 1861 Milam County, Texas
- Died: February 13, 1949 (aged 87–88) Willcox, Arizona
- Party: Democratic
- Spouse: Cora (second wife)
- Children: William M. Riggs Jr.
- Profession: Politician

William Monroe Riggs was a politician from Arizona who served in the Arizona state senate during the 2nd Arizona State Legislature. He was a cattleman in southern Arizona, and served on the Cochise County board of supervisors for several terms, being chairman for four years, and was elected to the Arizona state senate.

== Early life ==
Riggs was born in 1861 in Milam County, Texas, where his family had moved to from Alabama. The family moved to Colorado, and then they eventually to Arizona in 1876, first to near Fort Apache, then to near Fort Thomas on the Gila River, before they eventually settled down in the Sulphur Springs Valley, near Dos Cabezas, Arizona. His father was Brannock Riggs, built up the Riggs Ranch, which eventually encompassed 175,000 acres and had over 100,000 miles of wire fence, where he raised cattle. William had 9 siblings. Three of his brothers were named Barney, John, and Thomas, and three sisters were named Martha, Mary, and Rodah. His father and four of his brothers served in the Confederate army. Riggs attended the El Dorado School, the first school in Cochise County, and helped in its construction by hauling shingles for its roof from a nearby mill in the Chiricahua Mountains. As a young man he worked as a cowboy, saving his money which he used to pay to attend the Valparaiso Normal School when he was 30.

== Political career ==
In 1904, Riggs became a member of the Cochise County board of supervisors, elected for a four-year term. He was selected the chairman of the board. He was re-elected to the board in 1908 and 1912.

In April 1914, he announced his intention to run for one of the two state senate seats from Cochise County. In the primary, he upset C. M. Roberts. Both Roberts and W. P. Sims ran for re-election, but Riggs received more votes than either of them. The primary was held on September 8, and by the 13th, 32 out of 46 precincts had reported in, with Roberts solidly in second place with 1348 votes, behind Riggs with 1655, but in front of Sims with 1209. However, two days later, a week after the election, there was only a single district remaining, and Roberts lead had disappeared and Sims now led him by 16 votes. That district, West Huachuca, had a total of 24 Democratic votes to be counted. When all the votes were tallied the results were Riggs: 2643; Sims: 2107; Roberts: 2099; and Joseph H. Gray 1620. After his defeat, Roberts contemplated filing a legal contestation of the election, claiming Riggs' nomination was not legal. Both Sims and Riggs were elected in November's general election.

In 1916 he announced his intention to run for re-election to the state senate. The Democrat primary saw him in a re-match against Sims, along with newcomer, Fred A. Sutter, This time Sims got the better of Riggs, and he came in third with 2,337 votes, behind Sutter (2,699) and Roberts (2,480).

== Life outside politics ==
He was well-known cattleman in the southern part of Arizona. When his father died, the Riggs ranch was split between the sons, and Riggs' portion was near Dos Cabezas, Arizona. He was married twice, his second wife's name was Cora, and they had a son, William Jr., who served in the infantry in the Pacific Theater during World War II. He was president of the Riggs Bank, as well as being on the board of directors of the Willcox Bank and Trust Company.

Riggs became ill in late 1945, and died on February 13, 1949, in his home in Willcox, Arizona. He had been bedridden for most of the four years of his illness.
