= John P. Cull =

American politician

Arizona House of Representatives
- In office January 1919 – December 1920
- Constituency: Cochise County

Member of the Arizona Senate from the Cochise County district
- In office January 1921 – December 1922
- Preceded by: T. A. Hughes; D. C. O'Neil
- Succeeded by: C. M. Roberts

Personal details
- Died: January 26, 1955 Douglas, Arizona
- Party: Democratic
- Spouse: Georgina Henninger
- Profession: Politician, cattle rancher

John P. Cull was an American politician from Arizona. He served several terms in the Arizona State Legislature, beginning in Arizona House of Representatives during the 4th Arizona State Legislature, and then in the Arizona State Senate first in the 5th Arizona State Legislature, and again in the 10th Arizona State Legislature. In both of his re-election attempts to the State Senate he was defeated in the Democrat's primary. During his career he was involved in the banking and mercantile industries, and later on was one of the largest cattle ranchers in Cochise County. During the 1930s he also served on the Arizona State Livestock Sanitary Board.

== Biography ==
In 1906 Cull was on the board of directors for the First National Bank of Bisbee, also serving as their cashier. By 1910 Cull was in the mining boom town of Courtland, where he engaged as a merchant. By 1915, Cull had once again relocated, this time to Douglas. In 1918, Cull ran as a Democrat for one of the seven seats in the Arizona House of Representatives from Cochise County. In the primary, he was the top vote-getter. In November's general election, Cull was elected, again receiving the highest number of votes of any of the candidates.

On June 3, 1919, Cull married Georgina Henninger, of Bisbee, in a small ceremony at the bride's sister's house in San Francisco, California.

In 1920, he ran for the Arizona State Senate, one of four Democrat candidates, and with W. P. Sims, won the primary. Cull and Sims won the November general election. Both Cull and Sims ran for re-election in 1922. They were joined by former state senator C. M. Roberts, as well as political newcomers William Delbridge and T. A. Hughes. Roberts and Sims won the Democratic primary.

Cull was a prominent cattle rancher. He was one of the largest cattle ranchers in Cochise County. In 1930 he expanded his ranch holdings, purchasing a ranch north of Douglas. Cull was also a real estate developer, helping to develop the Palm Acres area of Phoenix in 1928, located on the old Heard ranch.

In 1930 he once again ran for the state senate. He and incumbent Fred Sutter ran unopposed in November's general election. He ran for re-election in 1932, but was defeated in the Democrat's primary. In 1936 Cull was elected as the president of the Southwestern States and Republic of Mexico Livestock Sanitary Boards. In January 1933, Cull was appointed by Governor Moeur to a three-year term on the Arizona Live Stock Sanitary Board. In March 1935, Moeur once again appointed Cull to a three-year term, which would expire in March 1938. When Governor Stanford took office in January 1937, he appointed two men to replace two of the existing members of the Livestock Sanitary Board, in order to take control of the board. One of those members was Cull, who fought to retain his position and refused to yield the office. The man nominated by Stanford to replace Cull, S. W. McCall, filed suit to have Cull removed, and Cull fought the suit. The suit hinged on the fact that when Moeur first appointed Cull in 1933 it was for a three-year term. When he re-appointed Cull in 1935, that was not a legitimate appointment, since his first term had not yet expired. The case made it all the way to the Arizona Supreme Court, where the court ruled in Cull's favor in early 1938. Cull remained on the board throughout the remainder of Stanford's term, and when Governor Jones took office in 1939, he re-appointed Cull to the board. Shortly after his appointment by Jones, in March 1939, Cull resigned his position on the board, citing his inability to go along with certain moves being made by the governor. Jones refused to accept the resignation until late April.

In 1945 Cull became a director of The Bank of Douglas. Cull died on January 26, 1955, in Douglas, Arizona.
