= Charles M. Roberts =

American politician

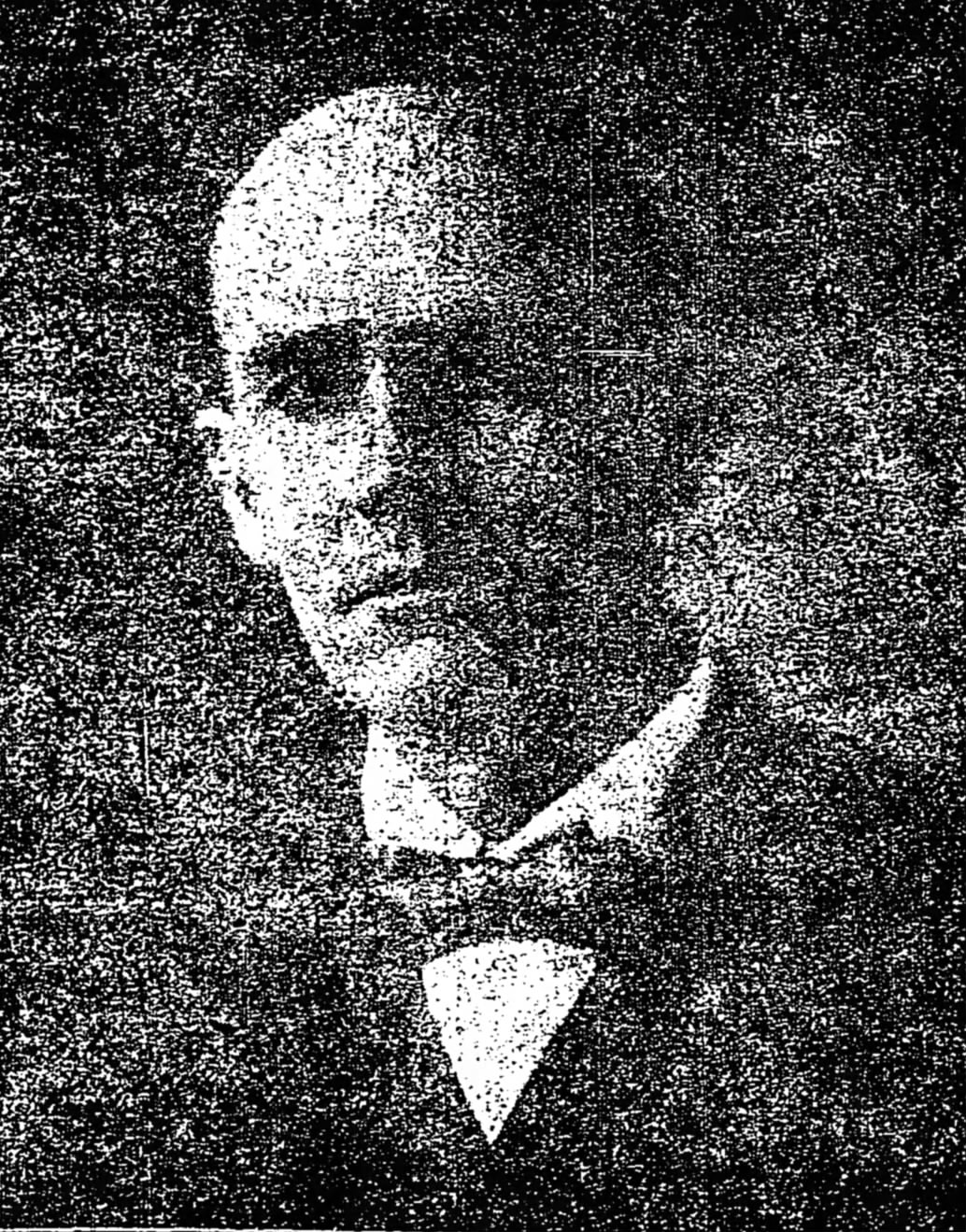
- C. M. Roberts in 1920

Member of the Arizona Senate from the Cochise County district
- In office March 1912 – January 1914
- Preceded by: First Senator from Cochise County
- Succeeded by: William M. Riggs

Member of the Arizona Senate from the Cochise County district
- In office January 1917 – January 1919
- Preceded by: W. P. Simms; William M. Riggs
- Succeeded by: T. A. Hughes; D. C. O'Neil

Member of the Arizona Senate from the Cochise County district
- In office January 1923 – January 1925
- Preceded by: John P. Cull
- Succeeded by: J. B. Wylie

Personal details
- Born: 1866 Texas, U.S.
- Died: October 12, 1932 (aged 65) Douglas, Arizona, U.S.
- Party: Democratic

Charles M. Roberts (1866 – October 12, 1932) was an American politician who served in the first Arizona State Senate.

== Life ==
Charles M. Roberts was born in Texas in 1866. His family moved to Colorado, and while there, he became interested in mining, gaining experience in the mines of Gunnison County, and near Leadville, among others. In the 1890s, Roberts brought a stake in the White and Billings mine, which he sold to the Dos Cabezas Consolidated Mines Company in 1900 for a sum in excess of $40,000. Shortly thereafter he acquired the rights to some copper mining properties in the Dragoon Mountains, known as the Holmes Group. In 1901, the Dos Cabezas group hired him as the superintendent for their mining operations. By the time of the writing of the Arizona Constitution, Roberts was one of the wealthiest men in the state, who in addition to his mining interests was also a cattleman. In 1914 Roberts served as one of several armed guards aboard a prisoner transport train, delivering 20 federal prisoners from several Arizona locations to the federal prison in Atlanta, Georgia. During the mid-1910s, Roberts was chairman of the Arizona State Fair Commission.

In 1918, Roberts' wife was appointed by Governor Hunt as a regent of the University of Arizona. She was the first woman to serve as a member of the Board of Regents. After entrance of the U.S. into World War I, Roberts applied to enlist the U.S. Army Corps of Engineers. Roberts died at a hospital in Douglas, Arizona on October 12, 1932.

== Political career ==
Roberts entered the political arena in 1906, when he was selected as an election officer for the Democrats in the upcoming primary elections. In 2010, Roberts was nominated as one of the Democratic delegates from Cochise County to the Arizona Constitutional Convention. All 10 of the Democratic nominees from Cochise County were elected to serve as delegates to the convention, including Sims. He was made chairman of the committee on private corporations and banks, considered one of the most important committees. Of the 52 delegates to the convention, 41 of them signed the completed constitution in December, while 11 did not. Sims was one of the signatories. In 1911 he declared his intention to run for the Arizona Senate, and was known to be a staunch supporter of G. W. P. Hunt. He was one of seven candidates for the two Cochise County seats in the Senate, three Democratic, two Republican, and two Socialist. In the Democratic primary, he received the most number of votes, with W. P. Sims coming in second. Both men won in the general election in December, becoming the first two state senators from Cochise County, with Roberts topping the vote count with 1,945, while Sims came in second with 1,856 votes. During the First Legislature, Roberts authored a significant bill which dealt with the expansion of the state's highway system. In 1912, Roberts lost to George A. Olney in the vote to become the chairman of the state's Democratic party.

In 1914, along with Sims, Roberts ran for re-election. It was known as early as March 2014 that Roberts would be seeking re-election. Sims also ran for re-election, however during the primary Roberts came in 3rd, behind a newcomer, William M. Riggs, who led all vote-getters, and Sims. The primary was held on September 8, and by the 13th, 32 out of 46 precincts had reported in, with Roberts solidly in second place with 1348 votes, behind Riggs with 1655, but in front of Sims with 1209. However, two days later, a week after the election, there was only a single district remaining, and Roberts lead had disappeared and Sims now led him by 16 votes. That district, West Huachuca, had a total of 24 Democratic votes to be counted. When all the votes were tallied the results were Riggs: 2643; Sims: 2107; Roberts: 2099; and Joseph H. Gray 1620. After his defeat, Roberts contemplated filing a legal contestation of the election, claiming Riggs' nomination was not legal.

In 1915, there was some talk of his seeking the gubernatorial nomination, succeeding Hunt. In 1916, as late as April, Roberts was claiming that he wanted to focus on his ranch, and doubted he would ever return to politics. However, in July 1916, he publicly announced his intention to run for one of the two slots in the upcoming Democratic primary for state senator. Sims had decided not to run for a third term, but Riggs was running again. There was another newcomer in the field, Fred Sutter, and in the primary Sutter came in first with 2699 votes, Roberts second with 2480, and Riggs in third with 2337. The general election in November saw Roberts returned to the state senate, coming in second to Sutter, 5722 to 4974. In 1917, Roberts put forth a bill which would curb the authority of the Arizona Corporate Commission. Talk of Roberts running for Governor resurfaced in 1917. In February 1918, Roberts announced his intention to seek the Democratic nomination for the state's Governor. However, at some point, Roberts dropped out of the race. In August 1918 he announced his intention to run for the County Board of Supervisors of Cochise County. He and I. C. E. Adams became the Democratic nominees in the Democratic primary, With Adams edging out Roberts by a vote of 2,615 to 2,585. Both Roberts and Adams won in the general election, with Adams getting the most votes, 5,239 and Roberts garnering 5,226.

In 1919, Roberts once again entered the contest for the Democratic nomination for Governor. While he was the first to declare his intent to seek the governorship, he withdrew from the race on August 18, 1920, stating, "Believing no Democrat can afford to consider personal interest above that of his party, I have decided to withdraw from the contest for the Democratic nomination for governor." Due to his aborted candidacy for governor, Roberts did not run for re-election for county supervisor in 1920. In 1922, he announced his intention to run yet again for the state senate, representing Cochise County. He was joined by former state senators Sims and John P. Cull, as well as political newcomers William Delbridge and T. A. Hughes. Once again, Roberts and Sims won the Democratic primary, and both won by large majorities in the general election in November.
