= Belshazzar's Feast (Rembrandt) =

Painting by Rembrandt

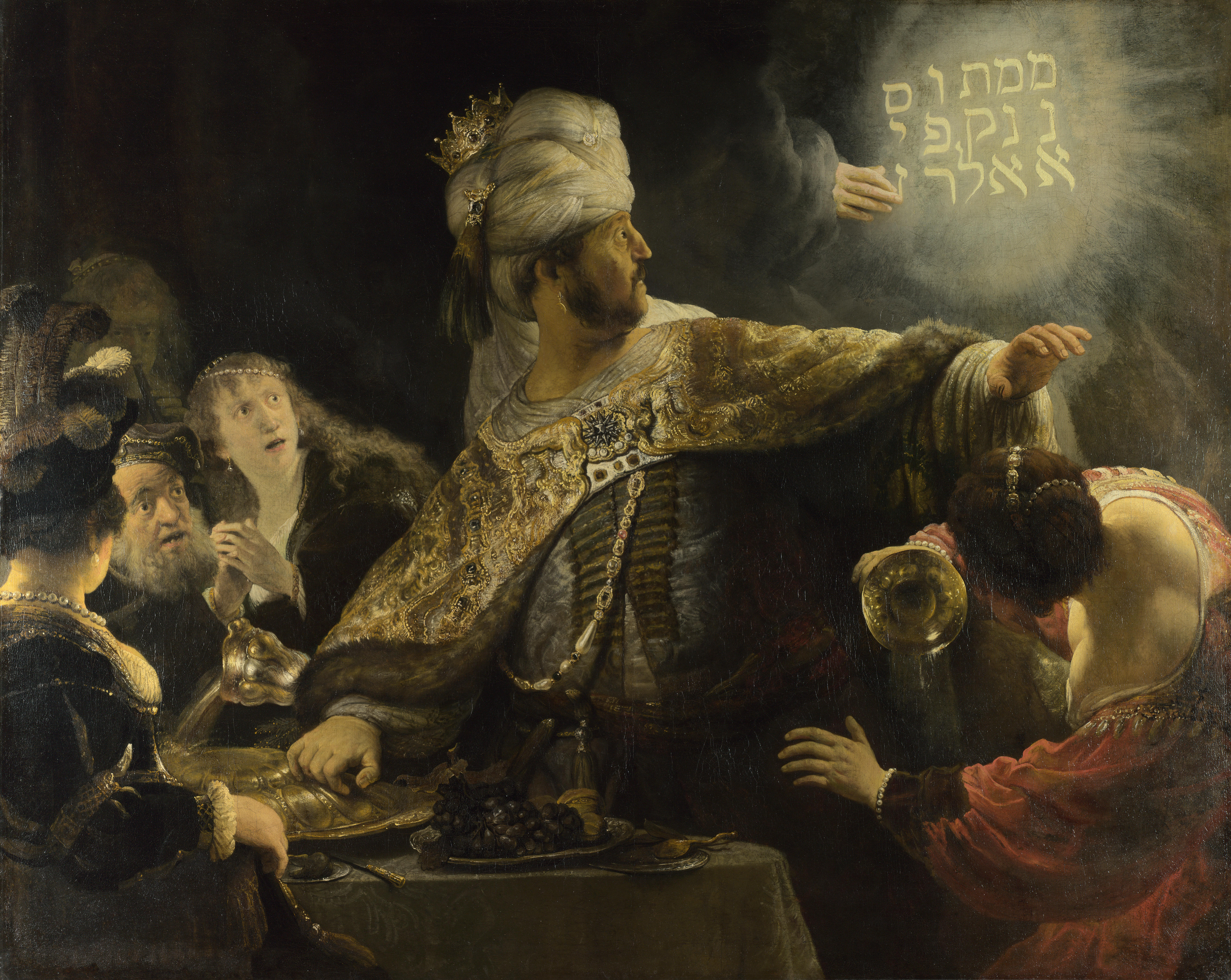
- Artist: Rembrandt
- Year: c. 1635–1638
- Medium: Oil on canvas
- Dimensions: 167.6 cm × 209.2 cm (66.0 in × 82.4 in)
- Location: National Gallery, London

Belshazzar's Feast is a major painting by Rembrandt now in the National Gallery, London. The painting is Rembrandt's attempt to establish himself as a painter of large, baroque history paintings. The date of the painting is unknown, but most sources give a date between 1635 and 1638.

== Context ==
The story of Belshazzar and the writing on the wall originates in the Old Testament Book of Daniel. The Babylonian king Nebuchadnezzar looted the Temple in Jerusalem and stole sacred artefacts such as golden cups. His son Belshazzar used these cups for a great feast where the hand of God appeared and wrote the inscription on the wall prophesying the downfall of Belshazzar's reign. The text on the wall says "mene, mene, tekel, u-farsin". Biblical scholars interpret this to mean "God has numbered the days of your kingdom and brought it to an end; you have been weighed in the balances and found wanting; your kingdom is given to the Medes and Persians".

The inscription on the wall is an interesting element in this painting. Rembrandt lived in the Jewish Quarter of Amsterdam and "derived the form of Hebrew inscription from a book by his friend, the learned Rabbi and printer, Menasseh ben Israel, yet mistranscribed one of the characters and arranged them in columns, rather than right to left, as Hebrew is written." The biblical story does not identify the language of the cryptic message, but it is generally assumed to be Aramaic, which, like Hebrew, is written in right-to-left rows, and not in right-to-left columns as in the painting. Although there is no accepted explanation why the Babylonian priests were unable to decipher the writing, the point of this unconventional arrangement – reading the text in the painting in the conventional row-wise right-to-left order results in a garbled message – may be to suggest why the text proved incomprehensible to the Babylonian wise men; This explanation is in accordance with the opinion of the amora Shmuel, which is mentioned in the Babylonian Talmud, Tractate Sanhedrin, 22a, among various dissenting views.

== Reception ==
The painting was in possession of the Earl of Derby at Knowsley Hall since 1736. The picture, however, was barely known beyond England, and it was not considered a masterpiece. As it was exhibited at the Art Treasures Exhibition in Manchester in 1857, the curator George Scharf wrote: "The whole picture, notwithstanding the boldness of the attitudes, is tame, and inadequate in execution." This lack of admiration can be explained in comparison to contemporary depictions of the biblical story, especially Belshazzar's Feast by John Martin (c. 1821), that earned much more reputation by its size and grandeur of its composition. This assessment changed in the second half of the 20th century together with the revaluation of Rembrandt's historical paintings. After Belshazzar's Feast was acquired by the National Gallery in 1964, it became very popular and was used many times as an illustration for commercial products like album covers. In 2014, it was the third most licensed image of the National Gallery.

== Painting materials ==
Rembrandt's handling of painting materials and his painting technique in Belshazzar's Feast are both exceptional and do not compare to any of his other works. The palette of this painting is unusually rich encompassing such pigments as vermilion, smalt, lead-tin-yellow, yellow and red lakes, ochres and azurite.

== See also ==
- List of paintings by Rembrandt
