= The Destruction of Pompeii and Herculaneum =

Painting by John Martin

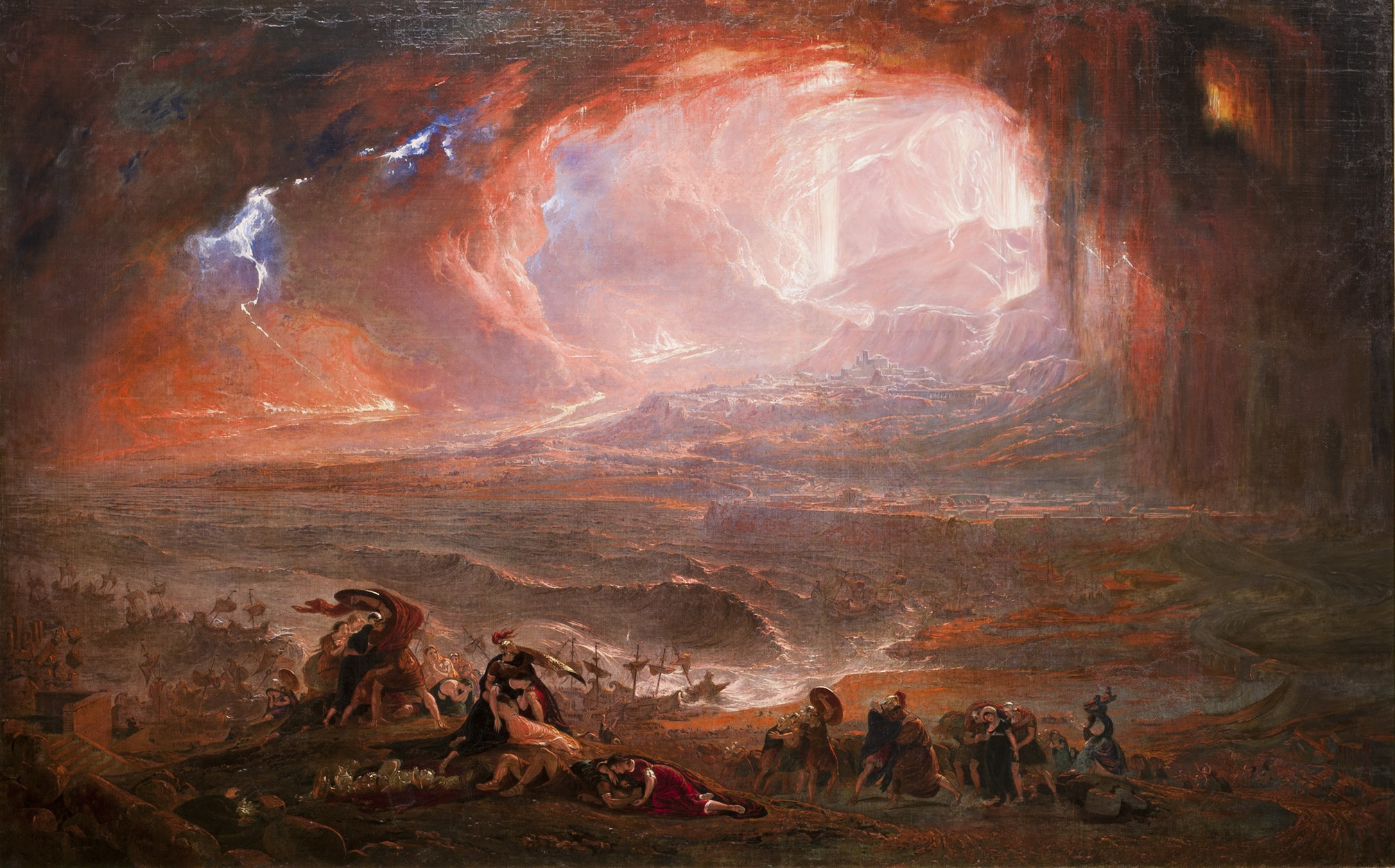
- Artist: John Martin
- Year: 1822
- Type: Oil on canvas, historical
- Dimensions: 253 cm × 161.6 cm (100 in × 63.6 in)
- Location: Tate Britain, London

The Destruction of Pompeii and Herculaneum is a large 1822 painting of the eruption of Mount Vesuvius in 79 AD by English artist John Martin. It follows the pattern set by his previous successful painting, Belshazzar's Feast, which was another depiction of a dramatic scene from history delivered from an esoteric point of view. The work appeared to be lost from the Tate Gallery storerooms soon after it was damaged by the 1928 Thames flood. However, it was rediscovered in 1973 and subsequently restored in 2011.

== The painting ==
Martin was (unusually) commissioned to paint the subject by Richard Greville, 1st Duke of Buckingham and Chandos, who paid 800 guineas. The painting is a monumental canvas 5 feet 3 inches (1.6 m) by 8 feet 2 inches (2.5 m) which depicts a view from Stabiae across the Bay of Naples towards the doomed cities of Pompeii and Herculaneum during the eruption of Vesuvius in 79 AD. The background is dominated by the apocalyptic scene of the erupting volcano, which casts a red light over the rest of the painting. Some buildings excavated at Pompeii, including the Temple of Jupiter and the amphitheatre, are visible in the middle distance. In the foreground are tiny figures of the fleeing citizens, including the dying Pliny the Elder. Martin relied on the recently published Pompeiana (1819) by William Gell and John Peter Gandy for background information on the Roman town, and on Edwin Atherstone's 1821 epic poem The Last Days of Herculaneum, published with Pliny the Younger's letters to Tacitus on the eruption.

== Reception ==
The purchasers of Martin's earlier paintings sent the paintings on tour in England as an advertisement for prints, to great commercial success, and Martin was determined to realise some value from his later paintings. The work was completed in 1822 and exhibited by Martin at the Egyptian Hall in Piccadilly in 1822 to great public acclaim but mixed critical reviews (the hall had hosted the London exhibition of Géricault's The Raft of the Medusa in 1820). Martin sold a pamphlet explaining the composition. An article in the Morning Chronicle described Martin's painting as "the most extraordinary production of the pencil that has ever appeared in this or any other country". The exhibition received 50,000 visitors from March to July 1822. Martin subsequently painted a smaller version, 33 inches (84 cm) by 48 inches (120 cm), which was sold to Sir John Leicester (later Baron de Tabley) in 1826, and which is now in the Tabley House Collection of the University of Manchester. The prime version of the work was restored in 2008 with the aid of this version.

== Provenance ==
The painting was added to the collection of the Duke of Buckingham and Chandos at Stowe House until at least 1838 and it was inherited by the 2nd Duke of Buckingham and Chandos in 1839. It may have been displayed at Buckingham House in London before the 2nd Duke was declared bankrupt in 1847. Martin's painting was auctioned at Christie's in 1848 and bought by art dealer Charles Buttery for only £100, and he sold it to the National Gallery in 1869 for £200. It was sent on long-term loan to the Manchester City Art Gallery until 1918, when it was transferred to the Tate Gallery. By then, Martin was out of fashion, and the painting was consigned to a basement, where it was severely damaged by the 1928 Thames flood. Considered beyond repair, it was left rolled up and forgotten until it was rediscovered in 1973 by Christopher Johnstone, a research assistant at the gallery, when he was researching his book John Martin (1974). Johnstone found the damaged work rolled up inside the canvas of Paul Delaroche's painting The Execution of Lady Jane Grey, which had also been forgotten and lost.

== Restoration ==
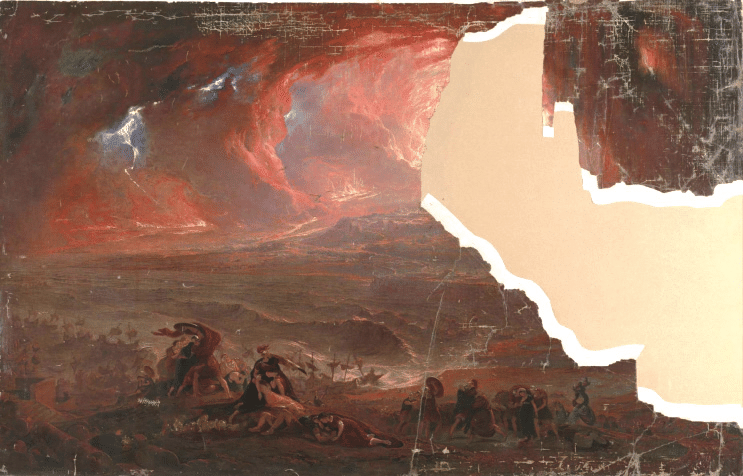
The Destruction of Pompeii and Herculaneum before restoration

Martin's painting was cleaned and restored in 2010–11 by Sarah Maisey, Clothworkers Fellow, and included in a major retrospective exhibition of Martin's work at the Tate Gallery in 2011–12. The original paintwork was in good condition, but a large area depicting the volcano and the cities – about a fifth of the whole – was missing. Maisey replaced the missing section, by drawing on photographs, Martin's smaller painting of the same subject from Tabley House, and an outline etching of the original.

== See also ==
- The Last Day of Pompeii, 1833 painting by Karl Briullov

== References and sources ==
Sources

- The Last Days of Pompeii: Decadence, Apocalypse, Resurrection, Victoria C. Gardner Coates, Kenneth D. S. Lapatin, Jon L. Seydl, Getty Publications, 2012, ISBN 1606061151, p. 132-133
- Tate Britain unveils John Martin’s lost masterpiece, Tate press release, 19 September 2011
- John Martin's Pompeii painting finally restored after 1928 Tate flood damage, The Guardian, 19 September 2011
- Pompeii painting at Tate after flood damage repaired, The Telegraph, 19 September 2011
