= Daniel Interpreting to Belshazzar the Writing on the Wall =

Painting by Benjamin West

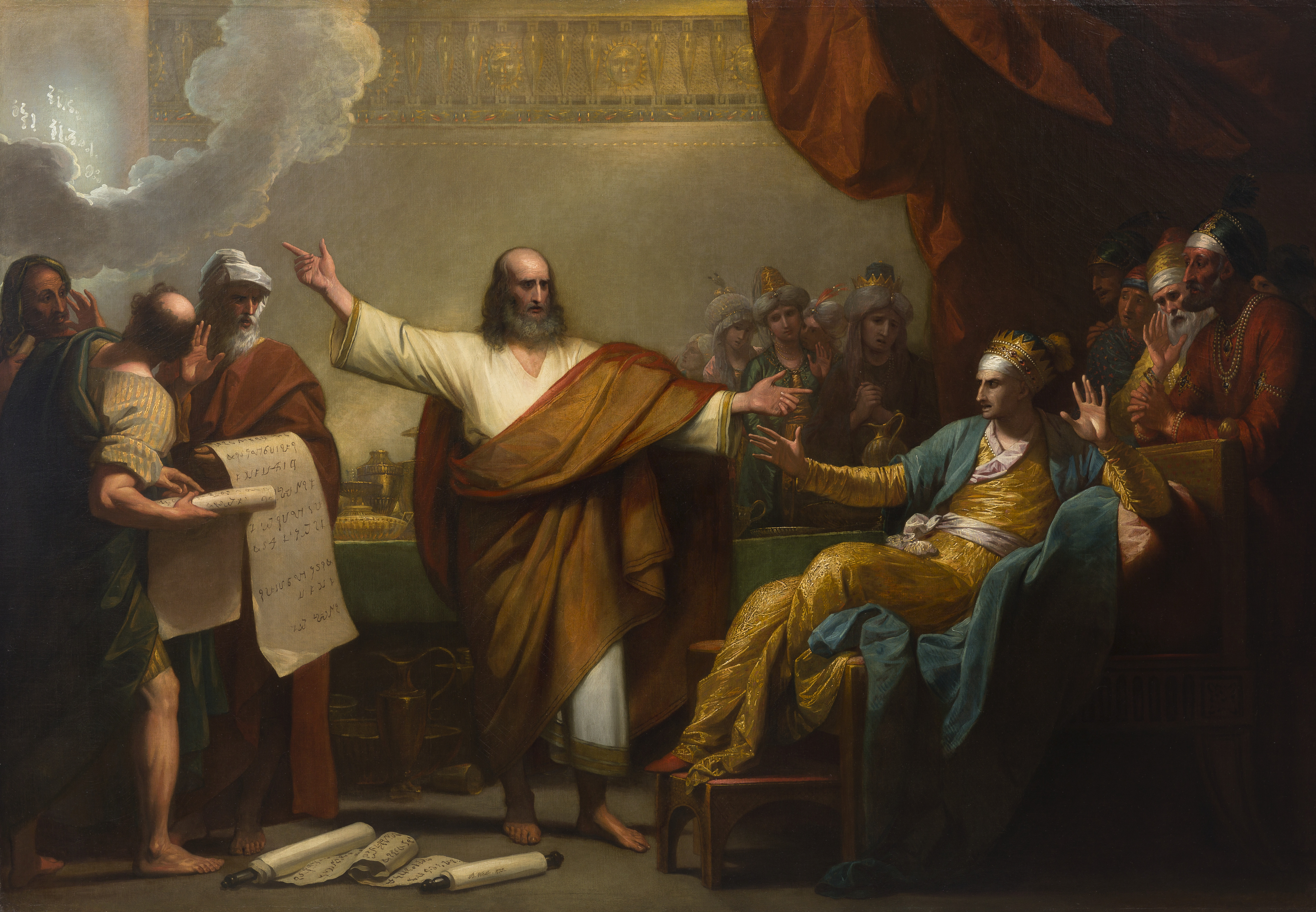
- Artist: Benjamin West
- Year: 1775
- Type: Oil on canvas, history painting
- Dimensions: 128.9 cm × 187 cm (50.75 in × 73.5 in)
- Location: Saint Louis Art Museum; Missouri

Daniel Interpreting to Belshazzar the Writing on the Wall is a 1775 history painting by the Anglo-American artist Benjamin West. It depicts the Old Testament biblical scene of Belshazzar's feast. Set during the Babylonian captivity it shows Daniel explaining to the crown prince Belshazzarthe meaning of the writing on the wall, a warning.

West was a leading Neoclassical painter who had enjoyed great success with his The Death of General Wolfe and produced a number of historical and religious scenes, many of them royal commissions from George III. He was elected as the second President of the Royal Academy in 1792. The painting was displayed at the Royal Academy Exhibition of 1776 held in Pall Mall and again in a retrospective held by the British Institution in 1820. Today it is in the collection of the Saint Louis Art Museum in Missouri. A mezzotint based on the painting was produced in 1777 by Valentine Green, a copy of which is now in the British Museum.

== Bibliography ==
- Dillenberger, John. The Visual Arts and Christianity in America: From the Colonial Period to the Present. Wipf and Stock Publishers, 2004.
- Grossman, Lloyd. Benjamin West and the Struggle to be Modern. Merrell Publishers, 2015.
- Menefee, Ellen Avitts. The Early Biblical Landscapes of Thomas Cole. Rice University, 1990.
