= T. A. Hughes =

American politician from Arizona

Member of the Arizona House of Representatives
- In office January 1917 – December 1918
- Constituency: Cochise County

Member of the Arizona Senate from the Cochise County district
- In office January 1919 – December 1920
- Preceded by: Fred Sutter; C. M. Roberts
- Succeeded by: W. P. Sims; John P. Cull

Personal details
- Party: Democratic
- Profession: Politician

Thomas A. Hughes was an American politician and businessman from Arizona. He served a single term in the Arizona State House of Representatives during the 3rd Arizona State Legislature, and a single term in the Arizona State Senate during the 4th Arizona State Legislature. He owned an insurance agency in Bisbee, Arizona, and later served as an officer of the Hartford Indemnity and Insurance Company.

== Biography ==
Hughes lived in Bisbee, Arizona. In 1904 he was working as a conductor on the Morenci Southern Railroad. In 1907 he opened a real estate office. In 1908 he added an insurance component to his business, the T. A. Hughes Insurance Company. Later that year, his company merged with the B. J. O'Reilly Insurance Company to form the Arizona Insurance Company. In 1909 he secured the local office in Bisbee, Arizona for the State Mutual Building and Loan Association of Los Angeles, allowing him to provide real estate loans.

In August 1916 Hughes announced that he would be seeking one of the seven seats from Cochise County in the Arizona House of Representatives. He was one of the seven Democrats selected in the primary, and was the overall highest vote-getter in November's general election. In 1918 he was one of three candidates running in the Democrat's primary for the two seats from Cochise County in the Arizona State Senate. Hughes and D. C. O'Neil, both of whom had served in the House during the previous term, became the Democrat's candidates. Hughes and O'Neil defeated their two Republican opponents, with Hughes receiving the most votes of any of the four candidates. He did not run for re-election in 1920. He was a charter member of the Bisbee Chamber of Commerce, formed in 1921. In 1922 Hughes, with a group of investors, purchased the western section of the Copper Queen Mine, forming the Copper Queen Mining Extension Company. In 1922 he once again ran for a State Senate seat from Cochise County. He was one of five candidates for the two seats in the Democrat's primary. Incumbent W. P. Sims, along with C. M. Roberts, who had served in the 3rd Arizona State Legislature, won the primary and went on to win the general election in November. In 1924 Hughes was made the secretary and treasurer of the southwest region of the Hartford Indemnity and Insurance Company. The company was headquartered in Los Angeles, and Hughes relocated his family there.
