= Tom Hughes (footballer) =

English footballer (1892–1916)

Personal information
- Full name: Thomas Hughes
- Date of birth: 1892
- Place of birth: South Hetton, England
- Date of death: 1 July 1916 (aged 23–24)
- Place of death: Somme, France
- Height: 5 ft 7 in (1.70 m)
- Position: Inside left

Senior career*
| Years | Team | Apps | (Gls) |
- Wallsend Park Villa
| 1912–1915 | Newcastle United | 2 | (0) |
- * Club domestic league appearances and goals

Thomas Hughes (1892 – 1 July 1916) was an English professional footballer who played in the Football League for Newcastle United. He was described as "a small and compact schemer" of an inside left.

== Personal life ==
Hughes served as a corporal in the Royal Northumberland Fusiliers during the First World War and was killed on the first day on the Somme. He is commemorated on the Thiepval Memorial.

== Career statistics ==
Appearances and goals by club, season and competition
| Club | Season | League | | | FA Cup | | Total | |
| Club | Season | Division | Apps | Goals | Apps | Goals | Apps | Goals |
|---|---|---|---|---|---|---|---|---|
| Newcastle United | 1912–13 | First Division | 2 | 0 | 0 | 0 | 2 | 0 |
| Career total | | | 2 | 0 | 0 | 0 | 2 | 0 |
