= Thomas Smart Hughes =

English cleric, theologian and historian

Thomas Smart Hughes (1786–1847) was an English cleric, theologian and historian.

== Life ==
Born at Nuneaton, Warwickshire, on 25 August 1786, he was the eldest surviving son of Hugh Hughes, curate of Nuneaton, and rector of Hardwick, Northamptonshire. He received his early education from John Spencer Cobbold, first at Nuneaton grammar school, and later as a private pupil at Wilby, Suffolk. In 1801 he was sent to Shrewsbury School, then under the head-mastership of Samuel Butler, and in October 1803 entered as a pensioner of St John's College, Cambridge. His university career was distinguished. Besides college prizes he gained the Browne medals for a Latin ode Mors Nelsoni, in 1806, and for the Greek ode In Obitum Gulielmi Pitt in 1807. He graduated B.A. in 1809 as fourteenth senior optime, and proceeded M.A. in 1811 and B.D. in 1818.

Hughes was appointed in 1809 to an assistant-mastership at Harrow, under George Butler, but returned to Cambridge in 1811. In the same year he was elected to a foundation fellowship at St John's, and in December 1812 accepted the post of travelling tutor to Robert Townley Parker of Cuerden Hall, Lancashire. During a tour of about two years he visited Spain, Italy, Sicily, Greece, and Albania. In September 1815 he was ordained deacon. He was appointed assistant-tutor at his college, but immediately resigned and accepted a fellowship and tutorship at Trinity Hall. In 1817 he accepted a fellowship at Emmanuel College and was elected junior proctor.

In 1819 he was appointed by Herbert Marsh, bishop of Peterborough, as his domestic and examining chaplain. He remained at Emmanuel, where he became dean and Greek lecturer. At Christmas 1822 he was appointed Christian advocate. On his marriage in April 1823 he became curate at Chesterton, but two years later returned to Cambridge, where he lived until about a year before his death, mostly writing, though some clerical duties. He was one of the first examiners for the new classical tripos of 1824, and again in 1826 and 1828. On 26 February 1827 he was collated by Bishop Marsh to a prebendal stall at Peterborough Cathedral In the same year he was an unsuccessful candidate for the head-mastership of Rugby School.

In 1832 Hughes was presented by the dean and chapter of Peterborough to the rectory of Fiskerton, Lincolnshire, and in the same year succeeded to the family living of Hardwick. In May 1846 he was presented to the perpetual curacy of Edgware, Middlesex, by John Lee.

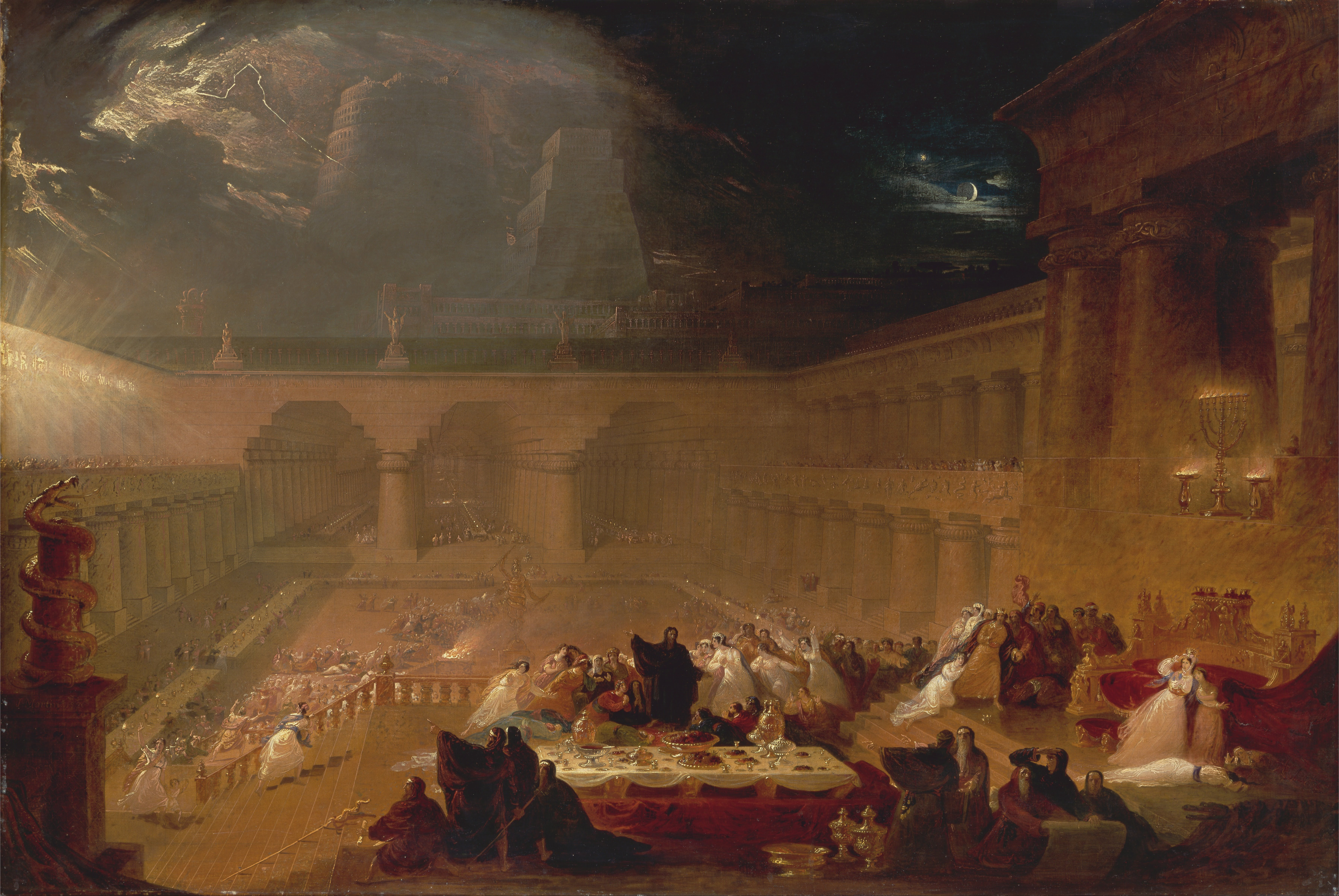
John Martin, Belshazzar's Feast (1820). Martin gave an account of how an argument with Washington Allston on how to treat the biblical subject led him to read Hughes's poem on the same topic; and how he proceeded to paint it in line with their common vision, despite opposition from Charles Robert Leslie.

Hughes died on 11 August 1847.

== Works ==
Hughes obtained Latin essay prizes in 1809 and 1810: the second essay, a discussion of the merits of Cicero and Lord Clarendon, was printed in vol. xvii. of the Classical Journal, 1818. He won the Seatonian prize for 1817 with a poem on Belshazzar's Feast; these verses inspired John Martin's painting on the subject. After his journey to Italy and Greece, he wrote Travels in Sicily, Greece, and Albania, 2 vols. 1820, which saw a second edition, partly enlarged and partly abridged, 2 vols., 1830. The first edition was translated into French by the author: Voyage à Janina en Albanie, par la Sicile et la Grèce, 2 vols., 1821; A German translation was published the same year in Jena, under the title Reise durch Sicilien und Griechenland nach Janina in Albanien. The work is illustrated with plates from the drawings of the architect Charles Robert Cockerell. In 1822 he published An Address to the People of England in the cause of the Greeks, occasioned by the late inhuman massacres in the Isle of Scio, and in 1823 Considerations upon the Greek Revolution, with a Vindication of the author's "Address" … from the attacks of C. B. Sheridan. His major work, the continuation of David Hume and Tobias Smollett's History of England from the accession of George III, was undertaken in 1834, at the request of A. J. Valpy. It was written quickly in monthly issues; but Hughes republished it with corrections, and with a large part actually rewritten. A third edition was issued in 1846 in seven octavo volumes.

In 1830 Hughes undertook an edition of the writings of divines of the English church in a cheap and popular form, with a biographical memoir of each writer, and a summary in the form of an analysis prefixed to each of their works. Twenty-two volumes of this collection appeared.

Hughes also wrote:

- A Defence of the Apostle St. Paul against the accusation of Gamaliel Smith, Esq. [i.e. Jeremy Bentham], in a recent publication entitled "Not Paul but Jesus," Part i., 1824. Part ii., published the same year, was entitled On the Miracles of St. Paul.
- A Letter to Godfrey Higgins on the subject of his "Horæ Sabbaticæ," 1826.
- The Doctrine of St. Paul regarding the Divine Nature of Jesus Christ considered; more particularly in answer to a pamphlet by Benjamin Mardon, intitled "The Apostle Paul an Unitarian," 1827.
- An Examination of St. Paul's Doctrine respecting the Divinity of Christ, in which are noticed some of Mr. Belsham's arguments in his translation and exposition of St. Paul's Epistles, 1828.
- An Essay on the Political System of Europe … with a memoir and portrait, 1855; it had been also prefixed to the third edition of his History, 1846.
- Remarks on "An Essay on the Eternity of the World, by a Sceptic," the second edition of which was published in vol. xxvi. of The Pamphleteer,' 1813, &c.

His literary and artistic collections were sold by Sotheby in January and February 1848.

== Family ==
He married April 1823 Ann Maria, daughter of the Rev. John Forster of Great Yarmouth; she lived until 5 April 1890. His son was the cricketer and diplomatic consul Thomas Fiott Hughes.

== Notes ==
Attribution

This article incorporates text from a publication now in the public domain: "Hughes, Thomas Smart". Dictionary of National Biography. London: Smith, Elder & Co. 1885–1900.
