= Thomas Hughes (cricketer) =

English cricketer

Personal information
- Full name: Thomas Fiott Hughes
- Born: 28 January 1825; Chesterton, Cambridgeshire, England
- Died: 18 June 1887 (aged 62); Cheltenham, Gloucestershire, England
- Batting: Unknown
- Bowling: Unknown

Domestic team information
- Years: Team
- 1843–1845: Cambridge University

Career statistics
Competition	First-class
Matches	8
Runs scored	48
Batting average	4.80
100s/50s	–/–
Top score	15*
Balls bowled	591
Wickets	36
Bowling average	?
5 wickets in innings	5
10 wickets in match	1
Best bowling	7/?
Catches/stumpings	4/–
- Source: Cricinfo, 25 January 2022

Thomas Fiott Hughes (28 January 1825 — 18 June 1887) was an English first-class cricketer and diplomatic secretary and consul to the Ottoman Empire.

The son of Thomas Smart Hughes and his wife, Ann Maria, he was born in January 1825 at Chesterton, Cambridgeshire. He was not educated at a public school, which did not hinder his matriculation to Trinity Hall, Cambridge. While studying at Cambridge, he played first-class cricket for Cambridge University Cricket Club in 1843 and 1845, making eight appearances. Playing in the Cambridge side as a bowler, Hughes took 36 wickets in his eight matches, which included taking a five wicket haul on five occasions and ten-wickets in a match once. As a tailend batsman, he scored 48 runs with a highest score of 15 not out.

After graduating from Cambridge, Hughes entered into the Diplomatic Corps. He was appointed to secretary at the British Embassy at Constantinople in the Ottoman Empire in June 1846. a position he held for ten years until his appointment as consul at Erzurum in July 1856. He returned to Constantinople in March 1859, to take up the appointment of Oriental Secretary there. At the time of his death at Cheltenham in June 1887, Hughes was regarded as a distinguished Oriental scholar.
