= Belshazzar's Feast (Martin) =

Painting by John Martin

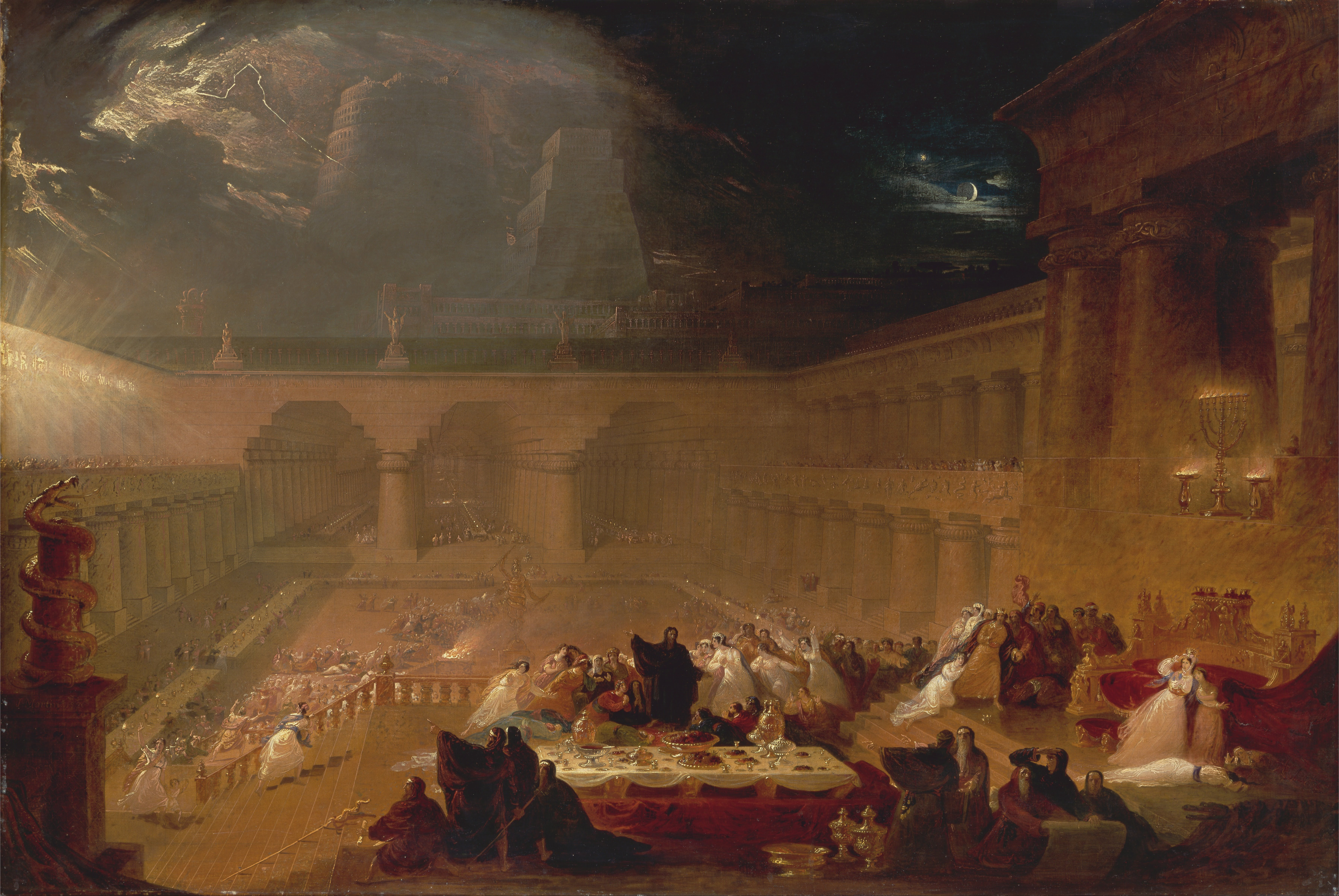
- Artist: John Martin
- Year: 1821
- Type: Oil on canvas, historical
- Dimensions: 80 cm × 120.7 cm (31 in × 47.5 in)
- Location: Yale Center for British Art, New Haven

Belshazzar's Feast is an oil painting by British painter John Martin (1789–1854). It was first exhibited at the British Institution in February 1821 and won a prize of £200 (equivalent to £18,984 in 2025) for the best picture. It was so popular that it needed to be protected from the crowds by a railing, and established Martin's fame. In the words of Martin's biographer William Feaver, he "turned literary references to visual reality". Martin published mezzotint engravings in 1826 and 1832. The original painting is now held in a private collection; two smaller contemporaneous "sketches" are held by the Yale Center for British Art in New Haven, Connecticut and the Wadsworth Atheneum in Hartford, Connecticut.

== The subject ==
The Biblical episode depicted in the painting – Belshazzar's Feast – is described in the Book of Daniel chapter 5. The Babylonian king Belshazzar is said to have defiled the sacred vessels of the enslaved Israelites by using them to serve wine at a banquet. The feast was then disturbed by the appearance of a divine hand, which wrote a glowing inscription on a wall – the writing on the wall – which was interpreted by the prophet Daniel as a portent of Belshazzar's doom. Belshazzar was killed that night, and Darius the Mede succeeded to his kingdom.

== History ==
The painting is the second piece in a trilogy of paintings by Martin on Mesopotamian themes, starting with his The Fall of Babylon in 1819, and completed with his The Fall of Ninevah in 1828. It was inspired by a conversation with the American artist Washington Allston and perhaps also by a poem by Thomas Smart Hughes.

It shows a panoramic view of a cavernous banqueting room with columns on both sides, decorated with signs of the zodiac. The hall is filled with crowds of feasting Babylonians and is open to the sky, with the Hanging Gardens of Babylon above, and the Tower of Babel and a ziggurat visible in the background, lit by the moon revealed by a break in dark swirling clouds. The architecture is inspired by Egyptian, Babylonian and Indian styles. Dressed in black, Daniel stands at the centre of the foreground, interpreting the supernatural writing on the wall of the hall. Belshazzar recoils in astonishment and dread to his right, and others look on in shock and horror.

Martin published an accompanying pamphlet with a key to help viewers to interpret the painting and identify the figures and structures. Although popular with the public, Martin's painting was not a critical success. There was appreciation of the magnificent architecture and emotional content, of the scale and bold colours of the work, but criticism of his painterly technique and particularly the execution of the figures. Charles Lamb called it vulgar and bombastic.

Martin sold the painting to his former master, glass painter William Collins, for 1000 guineas before the exhibition in 1821, and Collins made Martin agree not to reproduce the painting until Collins sold it. The Duke of Buckingham and Chandos offered Martin 800 guineas; disappointed, he commissioned Martin to paint The Destruction of Pompeii and Herculaneum instead. Collins sent the painting on an extensive tour of Britain, and it was wildly successful. By 1826, the accompanying pamphlet had reached its 45th edition. Martin was preparing to publish an engraved version in 1826, when Collins sued under the agreement not to reproduce the painting. Martin successfully claimed that he was reproducing his preliminary sketches, not the finished work, and versions of his engraving were published in 1826, in 1832, and for his Illustrations of the Bible project in 1835.

The painting was bought by Liverpool merchant John Naylor in 1848. It was damaged in 1854 on its journey to Naylor's gallery at Leighton Hall near Welshpool, when the cart transporting it was hit by a train, but the painting was quickly repaired. It was rejected by the National Gallery as being too large – 160 × 249 centimetres (63 × 98 in) – and is now part of a private collection. It was exhibited in 2011 at Tate Britain, next to a half-size (80 × 120.7 cm, 31.5 × 47.5 in) "sketch" made by the artist himself around 1820, now owned by the Yale Center for British Art. Another "sketch" is owned by the Wadsworth Atheneum.
