= Belshazzar's feast =

Bible story in the Book of Daniel

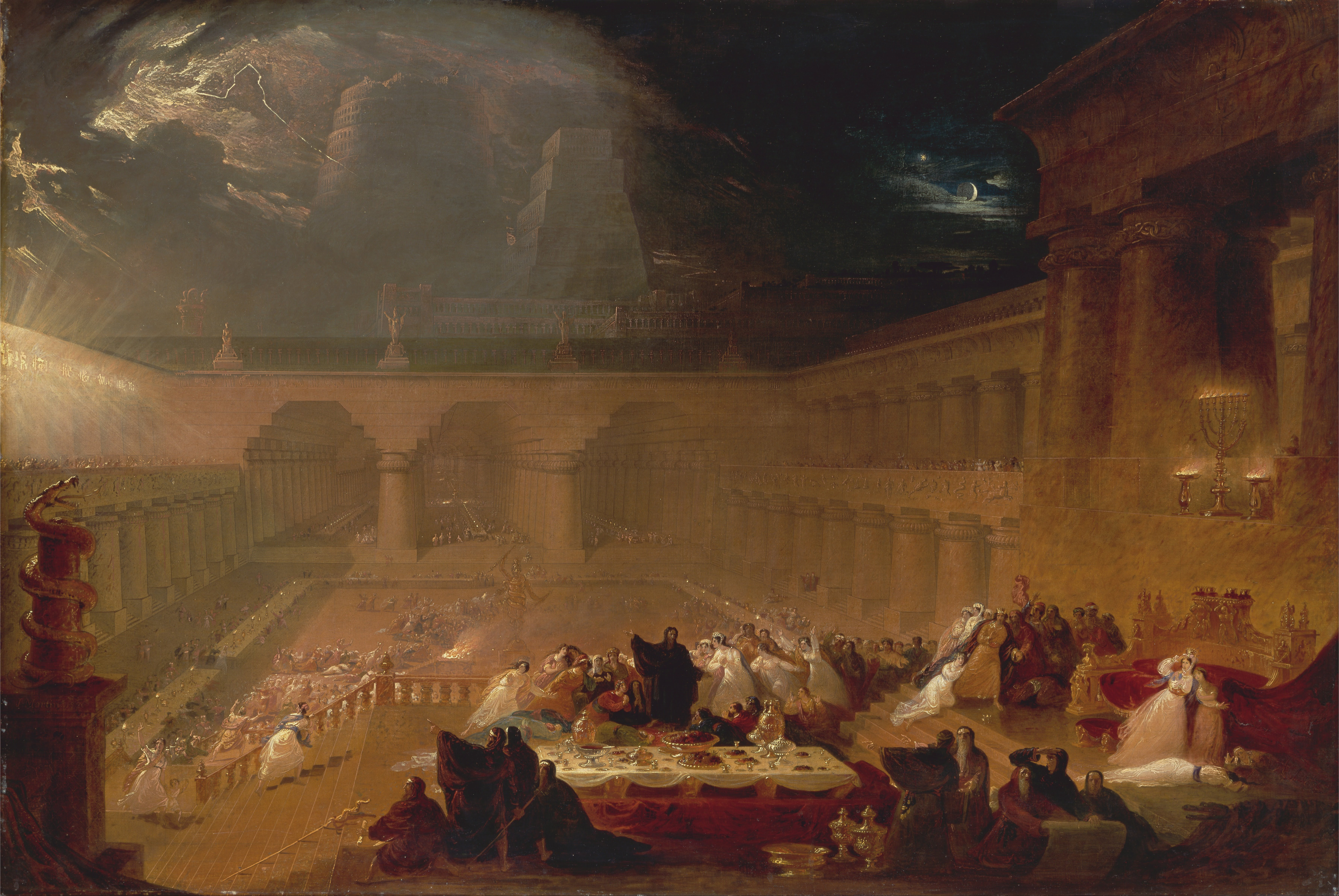
John Martin, Belshazzar's Feast, 1821, half-size sketch held by the Yale Center for British Art

The story of Belshazzar's feast (the writing on the wall) is contained in chapter 5 of the Book of Daniel. In the story, Neo-Babylonian royal Belshazzar holds a feast and drinks from vessels looted from the First Temple. A hand appears and writes on the wall and Belshazzar calls for his wise men, but they cannot read the writing. The queen advises him to send for Daniel, who reminds Belshazzar about Nebuchadnezzar's arrogance and subsequent humiliation (Daniel 4). Daniel reads and interprets the message: God has numbered Belshazzar's days, he has been weighed and found wanting, and his kingdom will be given to the Medes and the Persians.

That very night Belshazzar, the Chaldean [Babylonian] king, was killed. And Darius the Mede received the kingdom […]

— Daniel 5:30–31

Daniel 5 offers a contrast between Nebuchadnezzar and Belshazzar: When Nebuchadnezzar was humbled, he acknowledged the God of Israel and had his throne restored, but Belshazzar did not learn from Nebuchadnezzar's example and his kingdom was instead given to others.

According to John J. Collins, Belshazzar's feast is a legend conforming to the subgenre of the "tale of court contest", complicated by the inclusion of Daniel's indictment of Belshazzar's pride and his failure to honour the God of Israel. As a result, the tale has a double ending, in which Daniel is first showered with rewards and honours for interpreting the omen, and the king is then punished to fulfill the sentence pronounced by Daniel.

From the story, the idiom "the writing on the wall" came to mean seeing from the available evidence that doom or failure is inevitable, and "the writing on the wall" itself can mean anything portending doom or failure.

== Summary ==
=== Narrative summary ===
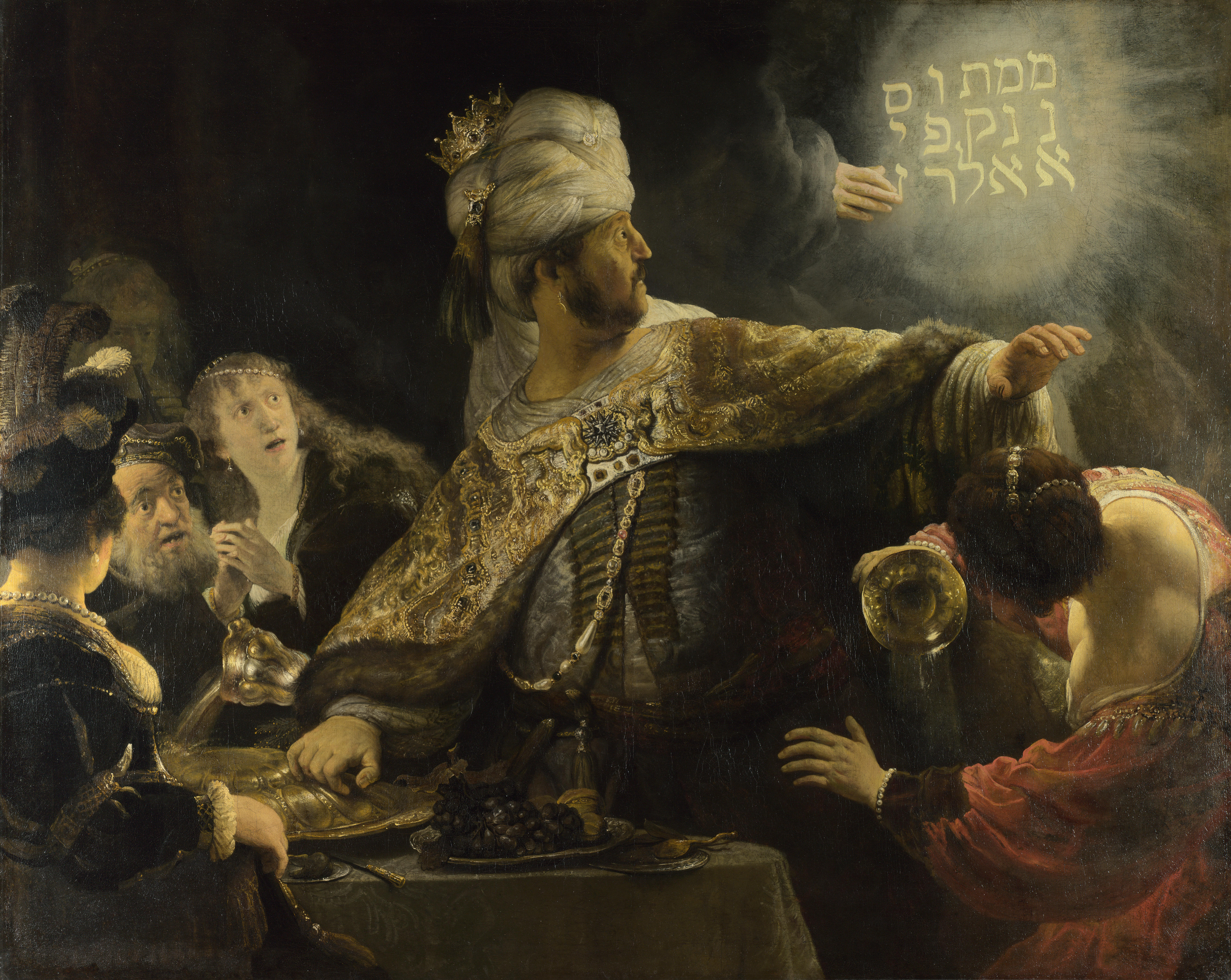
Belshazzar's Feast (Rembrandt, c. 1635–1638). The message is written in vertical lines starting at the top right corner, with "upharsin" taking two lines, following the interpretation of Samuel of Nehardea (b. Sanhedrin 22a).

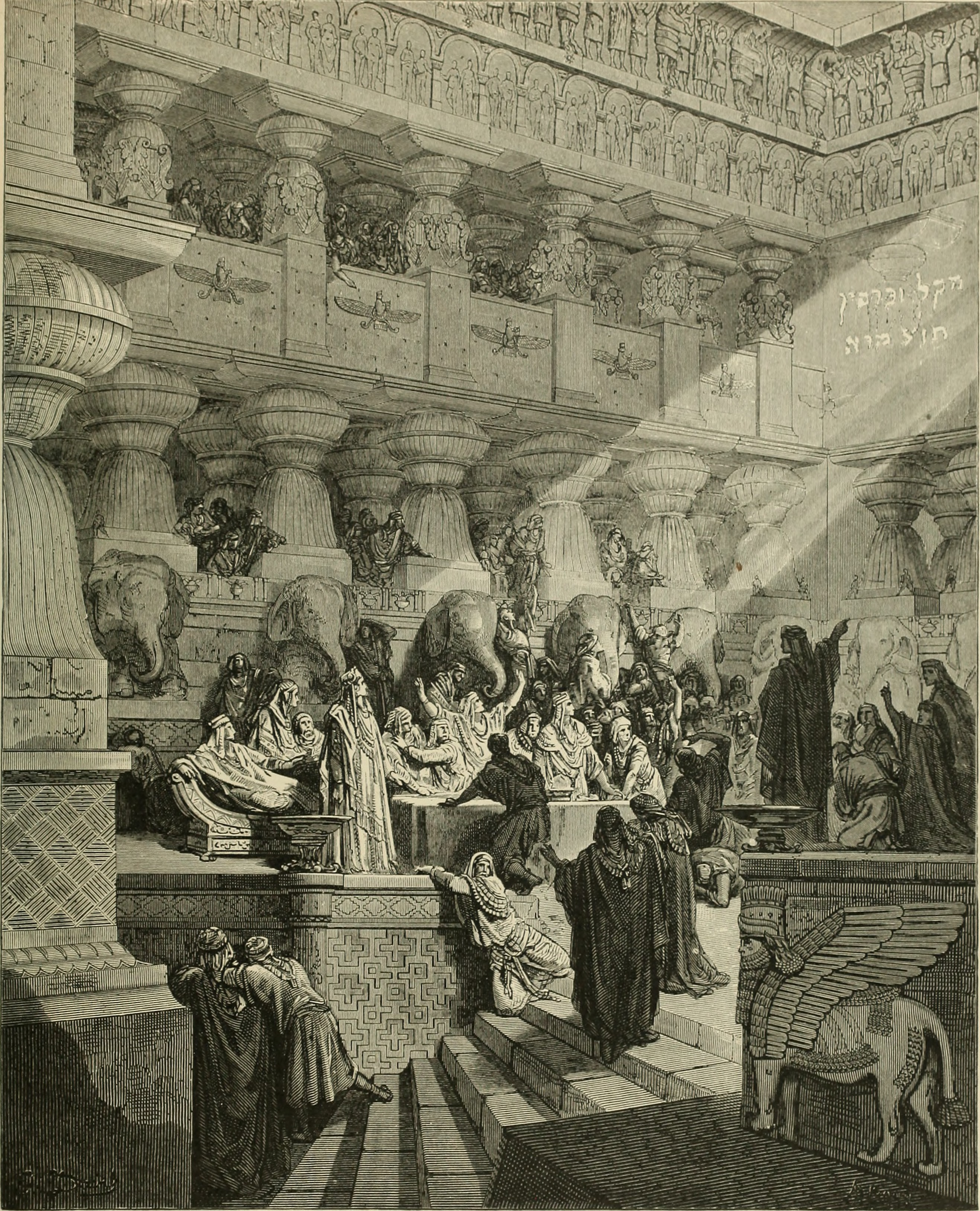
Gustave Doré's illustration of the writing on the wall from Daniel 5, Hebrew: מנא מנא תקל ופרסין, romanized: Mene! Mene! Tekel Upharsin!.

This section summarizes the narrative, as found in C. L. Seow's text translation in his commentary on Daniel.

King Belshazzar holds a great feast for a thousand of his lords and commands that the Temple vessels from Jerusalem be brought in so that they can drink from them, but as the Babylonians drink, a hand appears and writes on the wall. Belshazzar calls for his magicians and diviners to interpret the writing, but they cannot even read it. The queen advises Belshazzar to send for Daniel, renowned for his wisdom. Daniel is brought in, and the king offers to make him third in rank in the kingdom if he can interpret the writing.

Daniel declines the honour, but agrees to the request. He reminds Belshazzar that his father Nebuchadnezzar's greatness was the gift of God and that when he became arrogant, God threw him down until he learned humility: "The Most High God has sovereignty over the kingdom of mortals, and sets over it whomever He will." Belshazzar has drunk from the vessels of God's Temple and praised his idols, but he has not given honour to God, and so God sent this hand and wrote these words:

מנא מנא תקל ופרסין

Daniel reads the words "MENE, MENE, TEKEL, UPHARSIN" and interprets them for the king: "MENE, God has numbered the days of your kingdom and brought it to an end; TEKEL, you have been weighed ... and found wanting;" and "UPHARSIN", your kingdom is divided and given to the Medes and Persians. Then Belshazzar gave the command, and Daniel was clothed in purple, a chain of gold was put around his neck, and a proclamation was made… that he should rank third in the kingdom; [and] that very night Belshazzar the Chaldean (Babylonian) king was killed, and Darius the Mede received the kingdom".

=== Writing on the wall ===
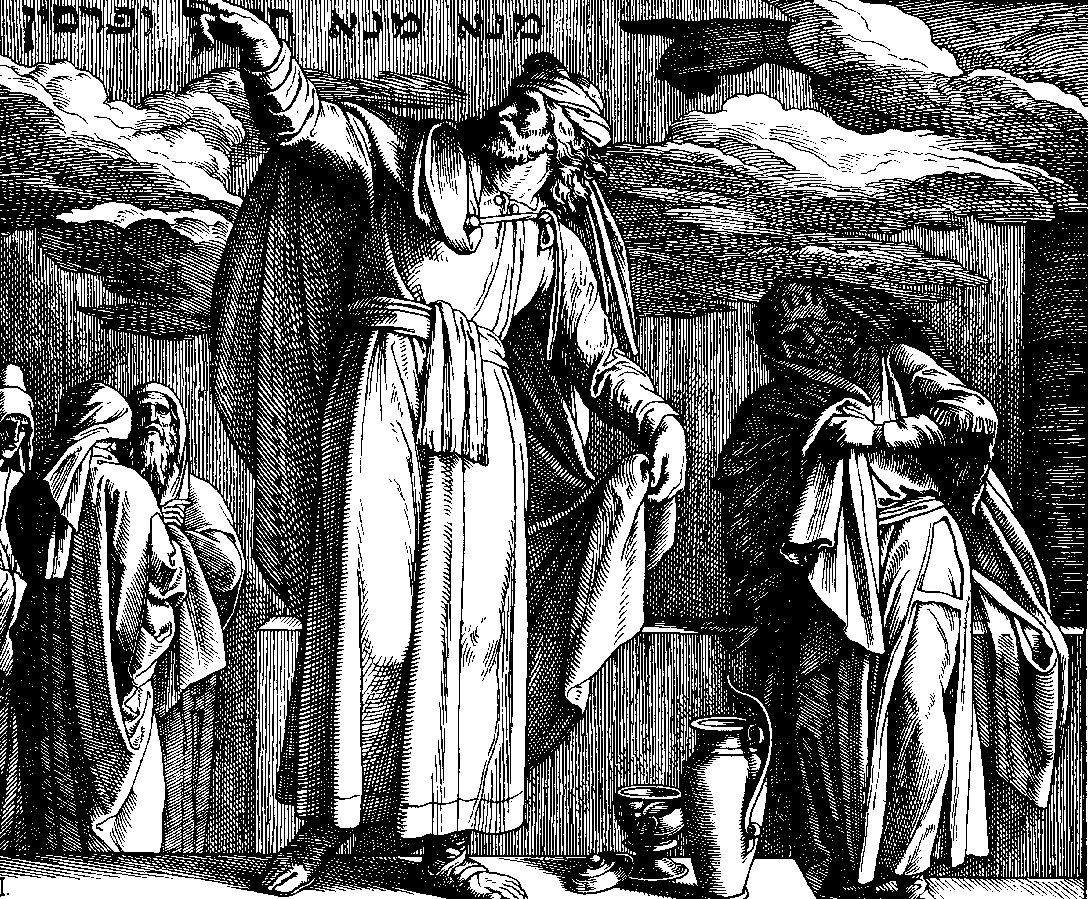
A woodcut by Julius Schnorr von Karolsfeld, 1860

None of the Chaldean wise men can even read, let alone interpret, the writing on the wall, but Daniel does so by supplying vowels in two different ways: first, the words are read as nouns, then as verbs. The nouns are monetary weights: a mənê, equivalent to a Jewish mina or sixty shekels (several ancient versions have only one mənê instead of two); a təqêl, equivalent to a shekel; and p̄arsîn, meaning "half-pieces". The last involves a word-play on the name of the Persians (pārās in Hebrew), suggesting not only that they are to inherit Belshazzar's kingdom, but that they are two peoples, Medes and Persians.

Daniel then interprets the words as verbs based on their roots: mənê is interpreted as meaning "numbered"; təqêl, from a root meaning to weigh, as meaning "weighed" (and found wanting); and pərês (פְּרַס), the singular form of p̄arsîn, from a root meaning "to divide", denoting that the kingdom is to be "divided" and given to the Medes and Persians. If the "half-pieces" means two half-shekels, then the various weights—a mənê or sixty shekels, another shekel, and two half-shekels—add up to 62, which the tale gives as the age of Darius the Mede, indicating that God's will is being worked out.

The phrase "writing on the wall" has grown to be a popular idiomatic expression referring to the foreshadowing of any impending doom, misfortune, or end. A person who does not or refuses to "see the writing on the wall" is being described as ignorant of the signs of a cataclysmic event that will likely occur soon.

One of the earliest known uses of the phrase in English was by Captain L. Brinckmair in 1638, whose report "The Warnings of Germany" during the Thirty Years' War cautioned that the violence there could soon spill over to England. "The writing on the wall" is sometimes referred to by the use of some combination of the words "Mene, Mene, Tekel, Upharsin", as they were written on the wall in the tale of Belshazzar's feast. The metaphor has consistently appeared in literature and media as a foreshadowing device since Brinckmair's report.

Shortly before midnight on 21 April 1947, Meir Feinstein or Moshe Barazani wrote "Mene! Mene! Tekel Upharsin!" from Daniel 5:25, on the walls of their shared death row cell in Jerusalem Central Prison in British-controlled Palestine, shortly before they then blew themselves to pieces. Their deaths are also commonly associated with another Bible quote – let me die with the Philistines – the words of Samson from Judges 16:30.

== Composition and structure ==
It is generally accepted that the Book of Daniel originated as a collection of folktales among the Jewish community in Babylon in the Persian and early Hellenistic periods (5th to 3rd centuries BC), and was later expanded in the Maccabean era (mid-2nd century) with the visions of chapters 7–12. Modern scholarship agrees that Daniel is a legendary figure, and it is possible that his name was chosen for the hero of the book because of his reputation as a wise seer in Hebrew tradition.

Chapters 2–7 of the book form a chiasm (a poetic structure in which the main point or message of a passage is placed in the centre and framed by further repetitions on either side):

- A. (chapter 2) – A dream of four kingdoms replaced by a fifth
  - B. (chapter 3) – Daniel's three friends in the fiery furnace
    - C. (chapter 4) – Daniel interprets a dream for Nebuchadnezzar
    - C'. (chapter 5) – Daniel interprets the handwriting on the wall for Belshazzar
  - B'. (chapter 6) – Daniel in the lions' den
- A'. (chapter 7) – A vision of four world kingdoms replaced by a fifth

Daniel 5 is thus composed as a companion-piece to Daniel 4, the tale of the madness of Nebuchadnezzar, the two giving variations on a single theme. This is spelled out in chapter 5 when Daniel draws a direct parallel between the two kings: the fate of Belshazzar illustrates what happens when a king does not repent.

Daniel 5 does not divide neatly into scenes, and scholars disagree with its structure. The following is one possible outline:

1. The king's banquet and the mysterious oracle: the king desecrates the sacred vessels, the hand writes on the wall (verses 1–6)
2. Attempts to interpret the oracle: the Chaldean sages fail, the queen recommends Daniel (verses 7–12)
3. Daniel appears before Belshazzar: Daniel addresses and rebukes the king, interprets the oracle, and is rewarded (verses 13–29)
4. Conclusion: Belshazzar's death, Darius' accession (verses 30–31)

== Historical background ==
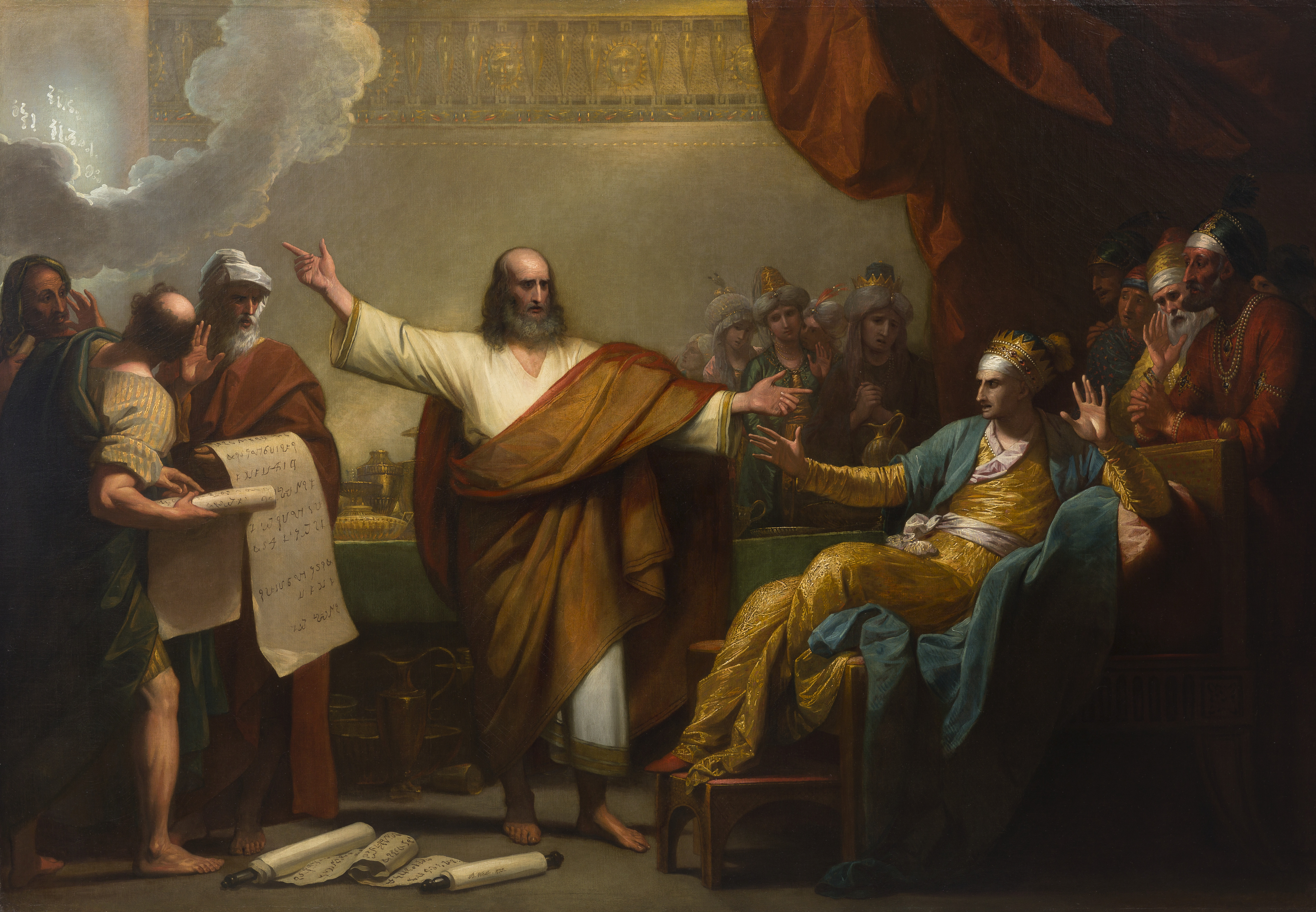
Daniel Interpreting to Belshazzar the Writing on the Wall by Benjamin West, 1775

The story is set around the fall of Babylon, when on 12 October 539 BCE, the Persian conqueror Cyrus the Great entered the city. Its last king, Nabonidus, was captured; his fate is unknown, although he may have been exiled. Several details in the text do not match the known historical facts. Belshazzar is portrayed as king of Babylon and son of Nebuchadnezzar, but was the son of King Nabonidus, one of Nebuchadnezzar's successors, who deputised for Nabonidus when the latter was away in Teima, but never became king. The conqueror is named Darius the Mede, but no such individual is known to history. The invaders were not Medes, but Persians. John J. Collins suggests this is typical of the story's genre, in which historical accuracy is not an essential element.

The constituent elements of the Book of Daniel were assembled shortly after the end of the Maccabean crisis, which is to say shortly after 164 BCE. The tales making up chapters 2 to 6 are the earliest part, dating from the late 4th or early 3rd centuries. Their setting is Babylon, and there is no reason to doubt that they were composed in the Babylonian diaspora, that is, among the Jewish community living in Babylon and Mesopotamia under Persian and then Greek rule. They reflect a society in which foreign rulers were not necessarily malevolent. For example, Belshazzar rewards Daniel and raises him to high office. This is a marked contrast with the visions of chapters 7–12, where the sufferings of the Jews are the result of actions by the evil 2nd century BCE king Antiochus IV Epiphanes.

== See also ==
- Babylon
- Cultural depictions of Belshazzar
- Fall of Babylon
