= Fred Sutter =

Arizona attorney and politician (1874–1941)

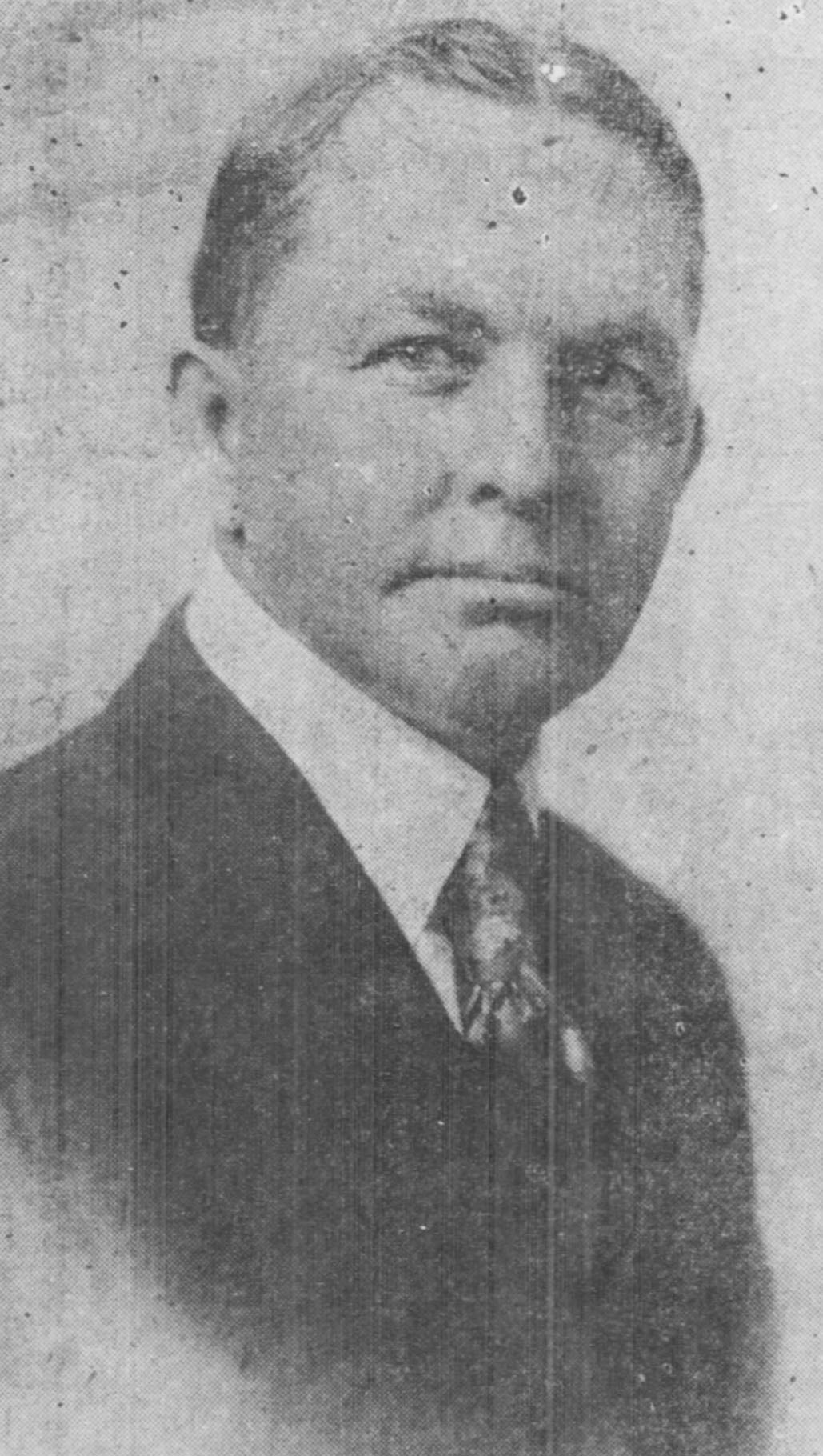

Member of the Arizona Senate from the Cochise County district
- In office January 1929 – December 1932
- In office January 1917 – December 1918

Personal details
- Born: 1874 Marshall, Michigan, U.S.
- Died: November 23, 1941 (aged 67) Tucson, Arizona, U.S.
- Party: Democratic
- Profession: Politician

Fred Arthur Sutter Sr. (1874 – November 23, 1941) was an Arizona attorney and politician. He ran several times, unsuccessfully, for governor of the state, and was elected several times to the state legislature.

== Early life ==
Fred Sutter was born in Marshall, Michigan, before moving to Nebraska with his family. The family then moved to Arizona in 1893. As young man, in 1894, he worked at the smelter in Bisbee, in order to earn money to help pay for his education expenses. In 1896, Sutter was sent to Shattuck's School in Faribault, Minnesota, following a send-off gala in Bisbee, Arizona. He finished attending the school and returned to Bisbee in 1899. He then went to law school, where he received his B. LL. By 1903 he was a practicing attorney in Bisbee, and was a partner in the law firm of Neale and Sutter. That same year he was chosen as the chairman of the welcoming committee for a visit to Bisbee by territorial governor Alexander Oswald Brodie. In 1904 he became the town's assistant district attorney, and became the town's district attorney in April of that year. When the Democrats held their territorial convention in Tucson in the Spring of 1904, Sutter was elected chairman. Later that year his wife became very ill with a bout of typhoid fever. In November 1910, she died suddenly from heart failure. Sutter accompanied his wife's remains to Nebraska, where she was from, for her burial.

== Political career ==
While he had been active in the Democratic party, he had never held a publicly elected office. In 1908, he became one of two Democratic candidates for the territorial legislature from Cochise County. Both he and his two running mates, Neil Bailey and Oscar W. Roberts, won election to the Arizona House of Representatives in the 25th Arizona Territorial Legislature. Sutter was the top vote-getter. Upon his election, he became one of the favorites to become Speaker of the House, however, he withdrew his name from contention shortly before the legislature convened. Sutter continued to be active in the county Democratic committee, and was known for bringing his bull dog, "Neale", to committee meetings. During the early 1910s, he was also president of the city Democratic committee, known as the "Warren District Democratic Club". Although he did not serve on the Constitutional Committee in 1910, he praised their efforts, and advocated that the territory accept the offer of statehood as presented by the U.S. Congress.

In August 1911, Sutter announced his candidacy for the Superior Court judgeship for Cochise County. In the October 24, 1911 Democratic Primary, Sutter was elected to represent the Democrats in the general election in December, defeating A. C. Lockwood of Douglas. The election was very close and was in doubt for several weeks, but the official final tally was 643 for Sutter and 635 for Lockwood, with a third candidate, Allen R. English, receiving 365. He was set to face off against Republican John Wilson (J. W.) Ross. The general election was held on December 12, and Sutter defeated Ross. It was initially reported that he had won by 482 votes, but when the official tallies were recorded with the county board of supervisors, the tally was 1993 for Sutter and 1512 for Ross, a 481 difference. His tenure was marked by his adjudicating a record number of cases in 1912. However, in June 1913 he suddenly and unexpectedly resigned from the court in order to return to his private legal career. Governor George W. P. Hunt appointed A. C. Lockwood, the man Sutter had defeated in the Democratic primary, as his replacement.

Even though he had stated his intention to not seek public office again when he resigned, when Democratic leaders began to float his name as a possible candidate in the Democratic primary for the governor's seat, he did not disavow those rumors. And by March it was being reported that he would be the conservative Democratic candidate in the primary, to oppose the more liberal Hunt. By mid-March Sutter had unofficially announced that he would run against Hunt in the primary. Within a month, Sutter was considered the front runner for the nomination, over the incumbent Hunt. Sutter's official announcement that he was a candidate for governor came on May 22 in Tucson. Fearful that the primary might shatter the Democratic party, Sutter withdrew from the race in early July, throwing his support behind Hunt.

During the summer of 1916, Sutter was approached by leaders of the Democratic party requesting that he run for the state senate, to which he agreed. He officially announced his candidacy on August 22, in order to be able to run in the Democratic primaries on September 12. After winning the primary, he also won the general election in November, receiving the highest number of votes of all the candidates for his senate seat.

In early 1918, Sutter was once again approached by leaders of the Democratic party to consider running in the Democratic primary for the governorship. He directly confronted the sitting governor over a dispute regarding the IWW, which the governor supported, and local mining operators in Bisbee, Sutter's hometown. On the floor of the legislature Sutter delivered what was considered a very impressive speech condemning the Governor's actions, and supporting the local miners. Sutter went on to successfully curtail Hunt's power to make appointments to the Arizona Council for Defense, the state body responsible for coordinating Arizona projects relating to the war effort. Hunt had been appointing liberal democrats, as he himself was one, to the board. Sutter led a movement which resulted in the number of members of the council was reduced from 50 to 14, one from each county, and any nominee by Hunt had to be approved by that county's board of supervisors. Sutter publicly announced his attention to seek the Democratic nomination in June. By the time the Democratic primary occurred, only three candidates were left: Sidney Osborn, Sutter and Fred Colter. On September 10, early returns showed Sutter with a slight lead over Colter. With only 29 of 82 statewide precincts counted, Sutter had 772 votes to Colter's 755, with Osborn a distant third with 71. However. by the time 79 precincts had tallied their votes, Colter had pulled into a commanding lead, with the three final precincts to be counted being small. Colter won the Democratic primary in September 1918, garnering 44% of the total votes, 14,539 to Sutter's 10,108 and Osborn's 8,390. Post-election analysis felt that the anti-Hunt faction of the party had split their vote between Osborn and Sutter allowing Colter to win the nomination. During the general election, supporters of Colter approached Sutter to request he write a public letter endorsing Colter. Sutter agreed, but with the provision that the letter also include his feelings towards Hunt and the I.W.W. issue. Not wishing the negative publicity, Colter's supporters withdrew their request.

== Other activities ==
In December 1921, the Arizona Fish and Game was formed, with Sutter serving the committee tasked with writing its constitution and by-laws.

== Personal life ==
Sutter remarried in June 1912. He eloped with Edna M. McGavock of Tombstone. The two boarded the Southwestern train to Tucson, traveling on the same train, but separately so as to not arouse suspicion. Upon arriving in Tucson, they obtained a license and then were married at the home of Reverend Dixon, after which they headed to California for their honeymoon. The Sutters had a son, Fred Sutter Jr., on April 12, 1914. A second son was born to the couple on August 15, 1915. In October 1917, Edna traveled to Winslow, Arizona on a visit to her parents. While there, she fell seriously ill with Peritonitis, and was taken to a hospital in Albuquerque, New Mexico. She appeared to be recuperating, but had a relapse in late November, at which time Sutter was summoned to her side. He was with her when she died on December 1. The Superior Court of Arizona at Tombstone was adjourned so the entire court could attend her funeral. In late October 1919, Sutter married a third time. In a small private ceremony in Tucson, he wed Olga Rodameyer, also of Bisbee, at the home of Reverend B.Z. McCullough. After a year of declining health, Sutter died in Tucson on November 23, 1941.

Sutter was also an amateur photographer, whose photo essay "Turning Night into Day" was published in the April 1917 edition of The American Journal of Photography.
