= Balthazar =

Balthazar, Balthasar, Baltasar, or Baltazar may refer to:

== Arts, entertainment and media ==
- Balthazar (novel), by Lawrence Durrell, 1958
- Balthasar, an 1889 book by Anatole France
- Professor Balthazar, a Croatian animated TV series, 1967–1978
- Balthazar (TV series), a 2018 French crime thriller drama
- Balthazar (band), a Belgian indie pop and rock group
- DJ Balthazar, a Bulgarian group
- Au hasard Balthazar, a 1966 French film directed by Robert Bresson
- Our Hero, Balthazar, a 2025 American comedy-drama film directed by Oscar Boyson

== People ==
=== Footballers ===
- Baltasar (footballer) (born 1966), Portuguese footballer
- Baltasar Gonçalves (born 1948), or Baltasar, Portuguese footballer
- Baltazar (footballer, born 1926) (1926–1997), Oswaldo da Silva, Brazilian football striker
- Baltasar (footballer, born 1933) (1933–2019), Egydio Felizardo, Brazilian football striker
- Baltazar (footballer, born 1959), Baltazar Maria de Morais Júnior, Brazilian football striker
- Marco Balthazar (born 1983), Brazilian footballer
- Batata (footballer) (Baltazar Costa Rodrigues de Oliveira, born 2000), Brazilian footballer

=== Other people with the given name ===
- Balthazar (given name), including a list of people with the name
- Balthazar (magus), a name commonly attributed to one of Three Wise Men
- Balthasar of Werle (c. 1375–1421), Lord of Werle-Güstrow
- Balthasar, Duke of Mecklenburg (1451–1507)
- Balthasar of Żagań (c. 1415–1472), a Duke of Żagań-Przewóz

=== Non-footballers with the surname ===
- Bogdan Baltazar (1939–2012), Romanian banker and politician
- Cecilia Baltazar, Ecuadorian politician
- Francisco Balagtas (1788–1862), or Francisco Baltazar, Filipino poet
- Hans Urs von Balthasar (1905–1988), Swiss theologian and priest
- J. G. Balthazar, Sri Lankan Burgher army brigadier
- Nic Balthazar (born 1964), Belgian film director
- Rui Baltazar dos Santos Alves (1933–2024), Mozambican lawyer, politician, and academic
- Vraîe Cally Balthazaar (born 1985), Sri Lankan politician and mayor of Colombo since June 2025
- Wilhelm Balthasar (1914–1941), World War II German Luftwaffe ace

== Places ==
- Balthazar River (Dominica)
- Balthazar River (Grenada)

== Other uses ==
- Balthazar (restaurant), in New York City, U.S.
- Balthazar (Perth restaurant), in Australia
- Balthazar Science Center, Skövde, Sweden
- Balthazar, a 12-litre wine bottle

== See also ==
- Belshazzar (disambiguation)
