= Sweden Solar System =

Permanent scale model of the Solar System

The Sweden Solar System

The Sweden Solar System is the world's largest permanent scale model of the Solar System. The Sun is represented by Avicii Arena in Stockholm (still known by most as Globen), the second largest hemispherical building in the world. The inner planets can also be found in Stockholm but the outer planets are situated northward in other cities along the Baltic Sea. The system was started by Nils Brenning, professor at the Royal Institute of Technology in Stockholm, and Gösta Gahm, professor at the Stockholm University. The model represents the Solar System on the scale of 1:20 000 000, i.e. one metre represents 20,000 km.

== The system ==
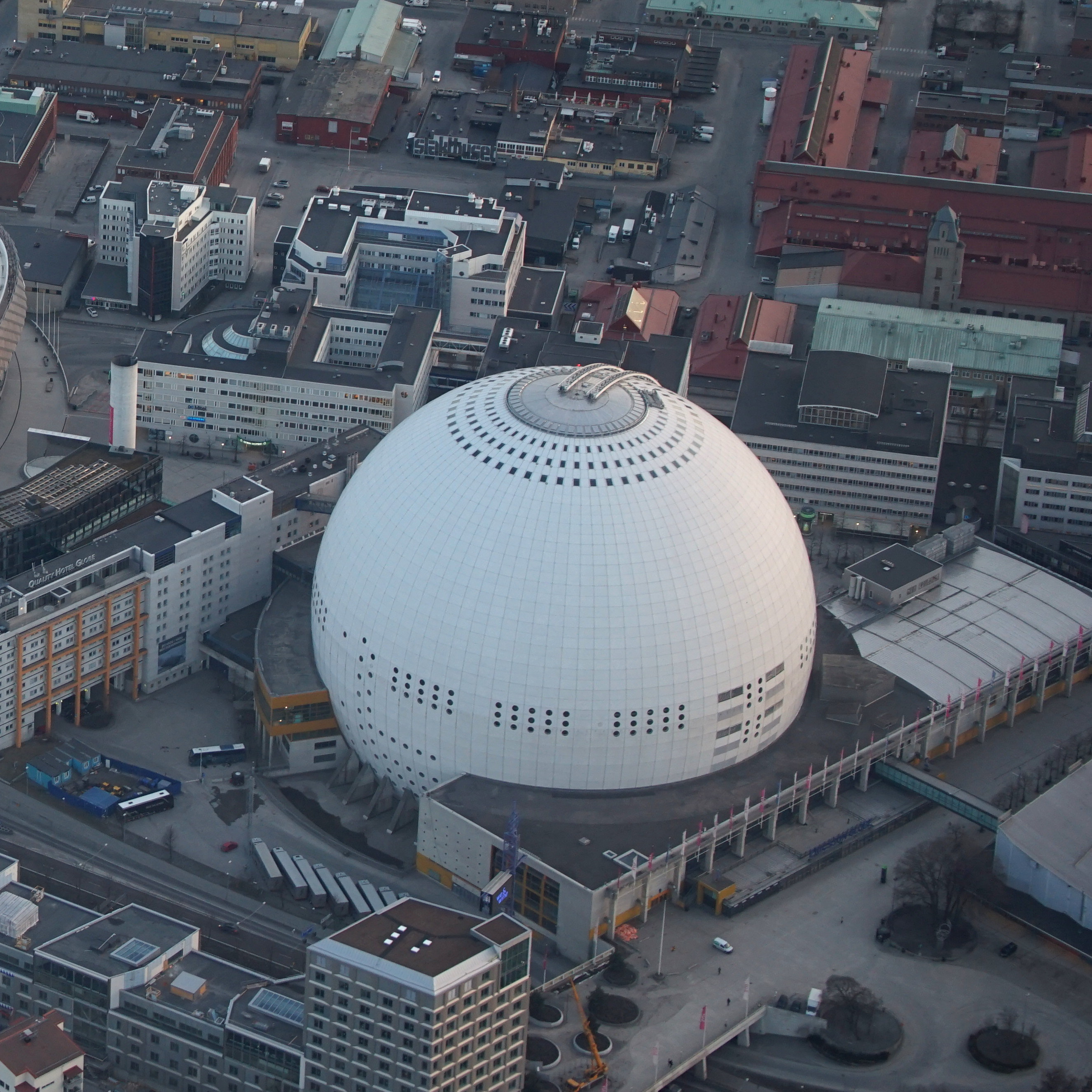
Avicii Arena, representing the Sun in the Sweden Solar System

The bodies represented in this model include the Sun, the planets (and some of their moons), dwarf planets and many types of small bodies (comets, asteroids, trans-Neptunians, etc.), as well as some abstract concepts (like the Termination Shock zone). Because of the existence of many small bodies in the real Solar System, the model can always be further increased.

The Sun is represented by the Avicii Arena (Globen), Stockholm, which is the largest hemispherical building in the world, 110 m (360 ft) in diameter. To respect the scale, the globe represents the Sun including its corona.

=== Inner planets ===
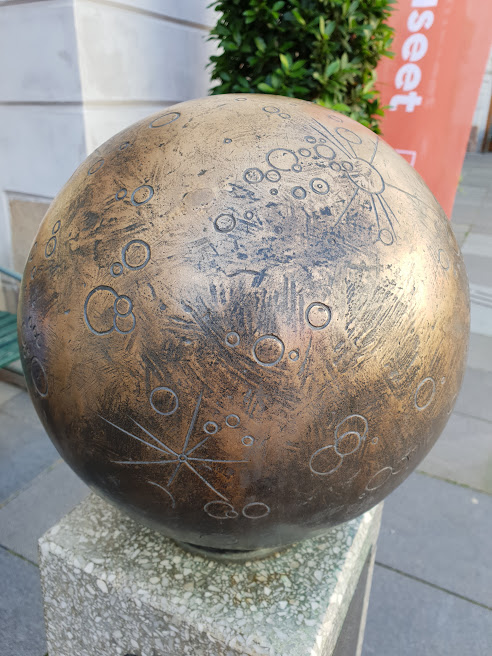
Mercury Model just outside the Stockholm City Museum

- Mercury (25 cm (9.8 in) in diameter) is placed at Stockholm City Museum, 2,900 m (1.8 mi) from the Globe. The small metallic sphere was built by the artist Peter Varhelyi.
- Venus (62 cm (24 in) in diameter) is placed at Vetenskapens hus at the KTH Royal Institute of Technology, 5,500 m (3.4 mi) from the Globe. It was previously located at the Observatory Museum in Stockholm (now closed). A previous model, made by the United States artist Daniel Oberti, was inaugurated during a Venus transit on 8 June 2004 and placed at the KTH Royal Institute of Technology. It fell and shattered around 11 June 2011.
- Earth (65 cm (26 in) in diameter) is located at the Swedish Museum of Natural History, 7,600 m (4.7 mi) from the Globe. Satellite images of the Earth are exhibited beside the Globe. An elaborate model of the Moon (18 cm (7.1 in) in diameter) is also on display, about 20 metres (66 ft) from the model of Earth.
- Mars (35 cm (14 in) in diameter) is located at Mörby centrum, a shopping centre and Stockholm Metro station in Danderyd, a suburb of Stockholm. It is 11.6 km (7.2 mi) from the Globe. The model, made in copper by the Finnish artist Heikki Haapanen, is connected by an "umbilical cord" to a steel plate on the floor having an Earth image. The globe also features marks that represent some typical Martian chemical elements.

=== Gas giants ===
- Jupiter (7.3 m (24 ft) in diameter) is placed inside the Clarion Hotel located at Stockholm Arlanda Airport in Sigtuna Municipality, 40 km (25 mi) from the Globe. Previously, it was made as a flower decoration, with different flowers representing different zones of the giant gas planet. Today, the planet is depicted as a ring light above a lobby.
- Saturn (6.1 m (20 ft) in diameter) is placed in Polacksbacken in Uppsala, 73 km (45 mi) from the Globe. It is a pergolalike structure with rings that are 13 m in diameter and benches representing the shepherd moons. Previously, it was represented by a mat in Celsiustorget, also in Uppsala. In addition, several schools in Uppsala are to provide moons of Saturn: the first completed was Enceladus (diameter 2.5 cm or 0.98 in) at Kvarngärdesskolan.
- Uranus (2.6 m (8 ft 6 in) in diameter) was vandalized and the new model was reconstructed behind Stora magasinet in Lövstabruk in 2012. It is an outdoor model made of blue steel bars. The rotation axis of the planet is marked in red.

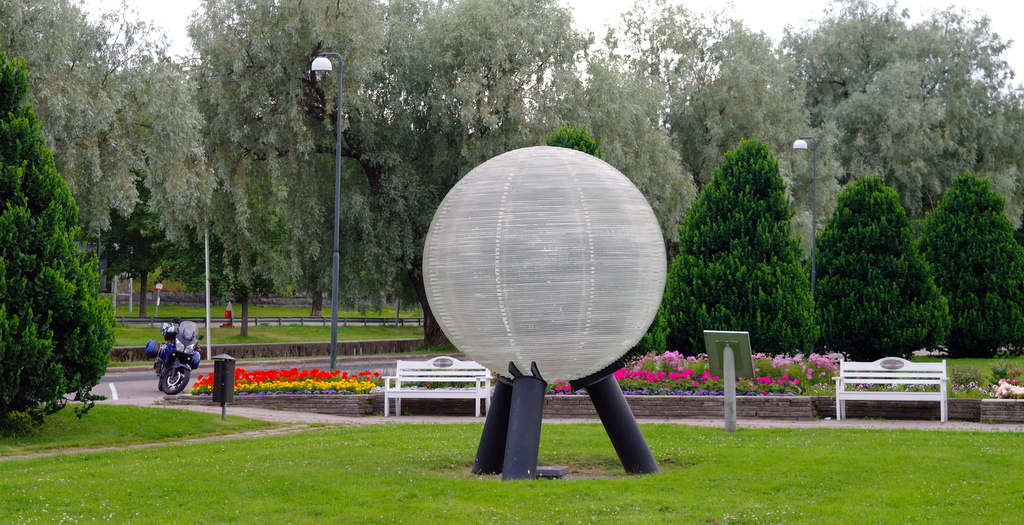
2.5-m representation of Neptune, by the river Söderhamnsån in Söderhamn

- Neptune (2.5 m (8 ft 2 in) in diameter) is located by the river Söderhamnsån in Söderhamn, a coast town with tradition of fishing and sailing (which relates to Neptune being the deity of the seas). Placed 229 km (142 mi) from the Globe, the model is made of acrylic and, at night, shines with a blue light.

=== Trans-Neptunian objects ===
- Pluto (12 cm (4.7 in) in diameter) and its largest moon Charon are placed near the southern of the Dellen lakes, in Delsbo, 300 km (190 mi) from the Globe. The lakes are thought to be formed by a meteorite impact 90 million years ago. The two bodies' sculptures are supported by two gravelike pillars (as Pluto is the deity for death), made up with dellenite, a rare mineral formed at that place by the meteorite impact.
- Haumea (8.5 cm (3.3 in) in diameter) and its moons are depicted in the 2047 Science Centre, Borlänge, 200 km (120 mi) from the Globe.
- Quaoar (6 cm (2.4 in) in diameter) is located in the library in Gislaved, 340 km (210 mi) from the Globe.
- Ixion (6.5 cm (2.6 in) in diameter), a dwarf planet candidate, is located at Technichus, a science center in Härnösand, 360 km (220 mi) from the Globe. The sculpture is an orb held by a hand with the arm. This plutino was discovered by a team which included scientists from Uppsala.
- Makemake (7 cm (2.8 in) in diameter) is located at Slottsskogsobservatoriet, an observatory in Gothenburg, 400 km (250 mi) from the Globe.
- 'Oumuamua (0.3 mm (0.012 in) in diameter) is placed in the village of Plönninge, Halland, 440 km (270 mi) from the Globe.
- Gonggong (7.5 cm (3.0 in) in diameter) is placed near the Tycho Brahe Observatory in Oxie, Malmö Municipality, 500 km (310 mi) from the Globe.
- Eris (13 cm (5.1 in) in diameter) is located at Umeå Arts Campus, Umeå, 518 km (322 mi) from the Globe. Made by Theresa Berg, the golden model is inspired by the mythical story of Eris sparking a quarrel between three Greek goddesses with a golden apple bearing the inscription καλλίστῃ (kallistē, "to the most beautiful one").
- Sedna (10 cm (3.9 in) in diameter), another dwarf planet candidate, is located at Teknikens Hus, a science center in Luleå, 734 km (456 mi) from the Globe. This represents a distance of about 15 billion km (100 AU); Sedna has a highly elliptical orbit, its distance from the Sun varying between 11–140 billion km (74–936 AU).

=== Other bodies ===
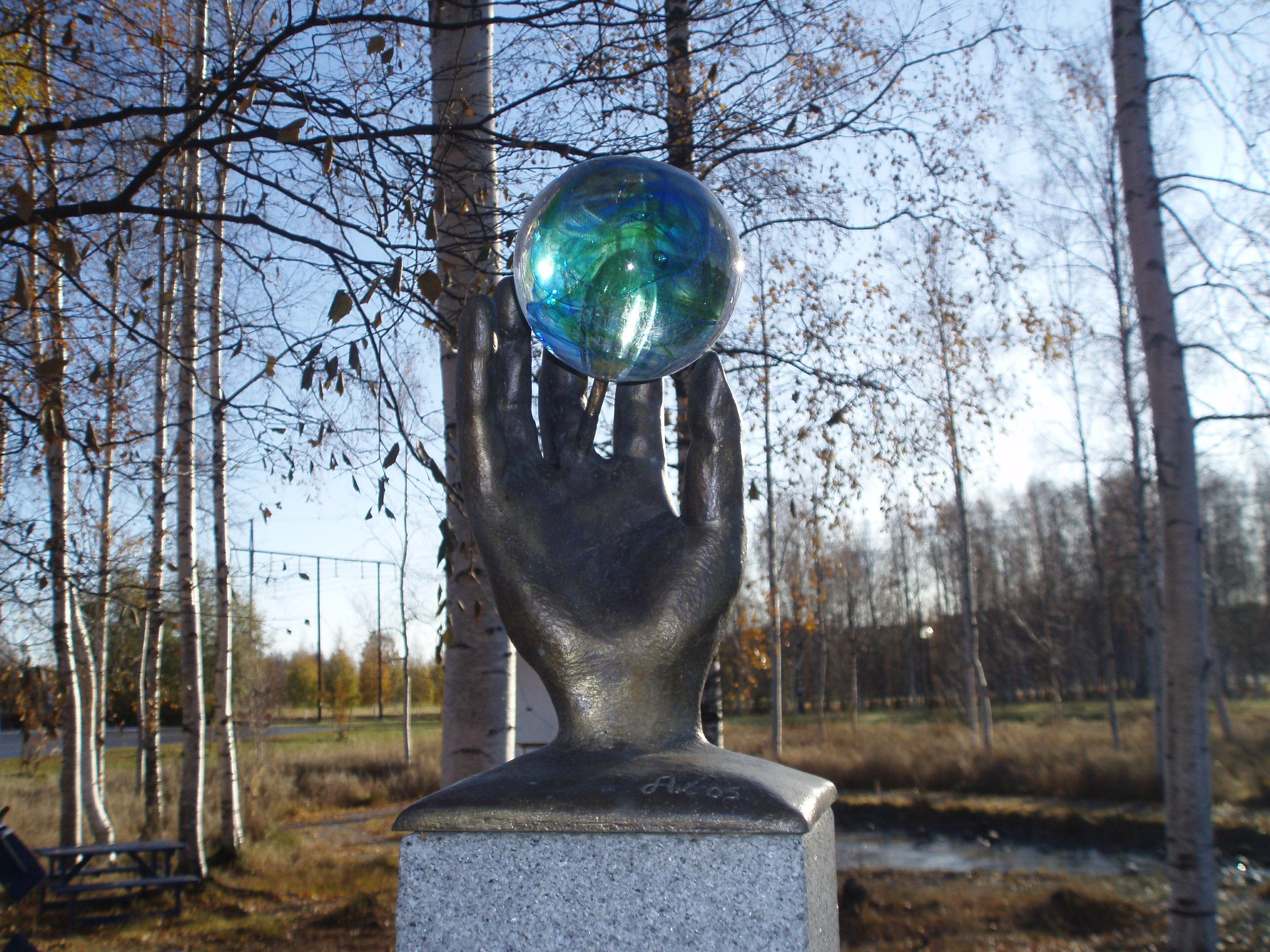
The dwarf planet Sedna

- 471926 Jörmungandr a minor planet in Stockholm.
- The near-Earth Object Eros is located at Mörbyskolan, a school in Danderyd Municipality (where Mars is located), 11 km (6.8 mi) from the Globe. It was created as a Valentine's Day project in gold, modeled after Eros, the god of love. The dimensions are 2 mm × 0.7 mm × 0.7 mm (0.079 in × 0.028 in × 0.028 in); (0.98 mm^{3} or 6.0×10^{−5} in^{3}).
- The asteroid 36614 Saltis is located at Saltsjöbaden's Kunskapsskola, a school near the Stockholm Observatory. The asteroid was discovered by A. Brandeker in 2000, using a telescope at the observatory, and the body was named after the observatory's location, Saltsjöbaden.
- The asteroid Vesta is located at Åva gymnasium, a public secondary school in Täby.
- The asteroid 306367 Nut, a.k.a. 5025 PL for Palomar-Leiden, (0.2 mm (0.0079 in) in diameter) is located in a park in Knivsta Municipality, 60 km (37 mi) from the Globe. It is not a sculpture but a dot on a map of the System, placed in front of Erik Ståhl's monumental cosmic sculptures.
- Halley's Comet is located at Balthazar Science Center, in Skövde. Inaugurated on 16 December 2009, there are actually four models of the comet: three placed outdoors, based on schoolchildren's drawings, plus one indoors, consisting of a laser passing through a block of glass.
- Comet Swift-Tuttle is placed at Kreativum, a science center in Karlshamn. The comet's orbit is closest to the Globe in inner Stockholm and farthest in Karlshamn, 390 km (240 mi) away.
- The Termination Shock is at the edge of the heliosphere: it is the boundary where the solar wind transitions to subsonic velocity. No sculpture currently represents the termination shock, but a foundation for a future sculpture exists at the Institute of Space Physics, 950 km (590 mi) from the Globe, in Kiruna, above the Arctic Circle.

== List of objects ==
Object	Distance from Globen	Diameter	Location	Coordinates	Inauguration date
Sun	—N/a	71 m (233 ft), the disk 110 m (361 ft), incl. the corona	Avicii Arena, Stockholm	59°17′36.80″N 18°04′59.65″E	19 February 1989
471926 Jörmungandr	1.8 km (1.1 mi)	0.05 mm	Ion Game Design office, Stockholm	59°18′34.7″N 18°04′21.9″E	23 September 2023
Mercury	2.99 km (1.86 mi)	25 cm (9.8 in)	Stockholm City Museum, Stockholm	59°19′10.8″N 18°04′16.8″E	1998
Venus	6.76 km (4.20 mi)	62 cm (24.4 in)	Vetenskapens hus, Stockholm	59°21′10.38″N 18°03′30.78″E	8 June 2004
Earth and Moon	8.58 km (5.33 mi)	65 cm (25.6 in) and 18 cm (7.1 in)	Swedish Museum of Natural History, Stockholm	59°22′08.48″N 18°03′12.34″E	before 2000
(433) Eros	11 km (6.8 mi)	2.0 mm × 0.7 mm × 0.7 mm	Mörbyskolan, Danderyd	59°23′38″N 18°02′41″E	14 February 2000
(36614) Saltis	11 km (6.8 mi)	< 1 mm	Kunskapsskolan, Saltsjöbaden	59°16′21″N 18°18′17″E	14 January 2010
Mars	11.93 km (7.41 mi)	35 cm (13.8 in)	Mörby centrum, Danderyd	59°23′52.58″N 18°02′11.58″E	before 2000
4 Vesta	16.4 km (10.2 mi)	2.6 cm	Åva gymnasium, Täby	59°26′24″N 18°03′47.16″E	6 September 2017
Jupiter	40.6 km (25.2 mi)	7.3 m (24 ft)	Stockholm Arlanda Airport	59°38′58.52″N 17°55′50.38″E	before 2000
(306367) Nut (5025 PL)	60 km (37 mi)	0.2 mm	Knivsta	59°43′10″N 17°48′07″E	
Saturn	67.9 km (42.2 mi)	6.1 m (20 ft)	Polacksbacken, Uppsala	59°50′25″N 17°38′57″E	22 October 2026
Uranus	124.8 km (77.5 mi)	2.6 m (8.5 ft)	Stora magasinet, Lövstabruk	60°24′31″N 17°52′37″E	13 October 2012
Haumea	200 km (120 mi)	10 cm	Borlänge	60°29′18.1″N 15°25′51.5″E	
Halley's Comet	204 km (127 mi)	Four representations, not scale models. (Note: Halley's Comet has a nucleus only 11 km in diameter, so if it were to scale, it would be only about half a millimetre (1/50 inch) in diameter. Its coma is up to 100,000 km in length, which would correspond to a "tail" of up to 5 metres.)	Balthazar Science Center, Skövde	58°23′14″N 13°51′11″E	16 December 2009
Neptune	230.9 km (143.5 mi)	2.5 m (8.2 ft)	by the river Söderhamnsån, Söderhamn	61°18′07″N 17°03′19″E	29 October 1998
Pluto and Charon	291.4 km (181.1 mi)	12 cm (4.7 in) and 6 cm (2.4 in)	by the lake Dellen South, Delsbo	61°47′50.13″N 16°32′59.96″E	before 2000
50000 Quaoar	340 km (210 mi)	6 cm	Gislaved Library, Gislaved	57°17′46.9″N 13°31′49.8″E	18 November 2017
(28978) Ixion	360 km (220 mi)	6.5 cm (2.6 in)	Technichus, Härnösand	62°37′49″N 17°56′12″E	18 April 2002
174567 Varda	370 km (230 mi)	33 mm	Bohusläns museum, Uddevalla	58°20′57.4″N 11°55′44.0″E	4 September 2021
109P/Swift-Tuttle comet	390 km (240 mi)	< 1 cm	Kreativum, Karlshamn	56°11′39″N 14°51′09″E	
Makemake	400 km (250 mi)	7 cm	Slottsskogsobservatoriet, Gothenburg	57°41′28.3″N 11°56′36.4″E	23 September 2017
ʻOumuamua	440 km (270 mi)	0.3 mm	Halmstad Municipality	56°44′04.8″N 12°44′42.8″E	August 2018
225088 Gonggong	400 km (250 mi)	7.5 cm	Tycho Brahe-observatoriet, Oxie	55°32′33.9″N 13°05′04.0″E	23 September 2017
(136199) Eris	510 km (320 mi)	13 cm (5.1 in)	Umeå Arts Campus, Umeå	63°49′14.2″N 20°16′34.1″E	6 December 2007
(90377) Sedna	810 km (500 mi)	10 cm (3.9 in)	Teknikens Hus, Luleå	65°36′59.50″N 22°08′06.00″E	8 December 2005
Termination shock	950 km (590 mi)	A plate	Institute of Space Physics, Kiruna	67°50′27″N 20°24′34.5″E	

== Gallery ==
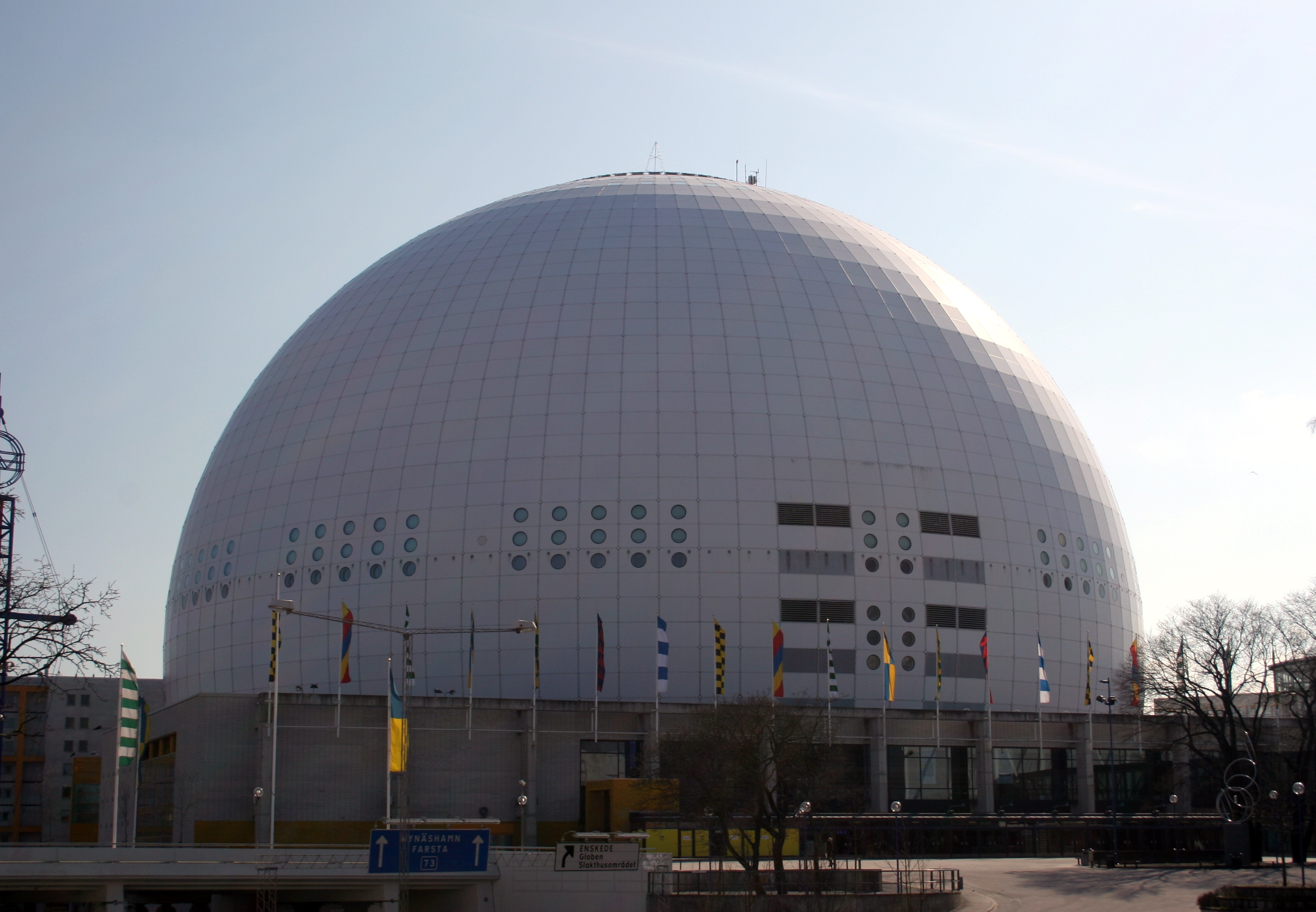
The Avicii Arena represents the Sun. The rest of the Solar System is scattered in, and north of, Stockholm.

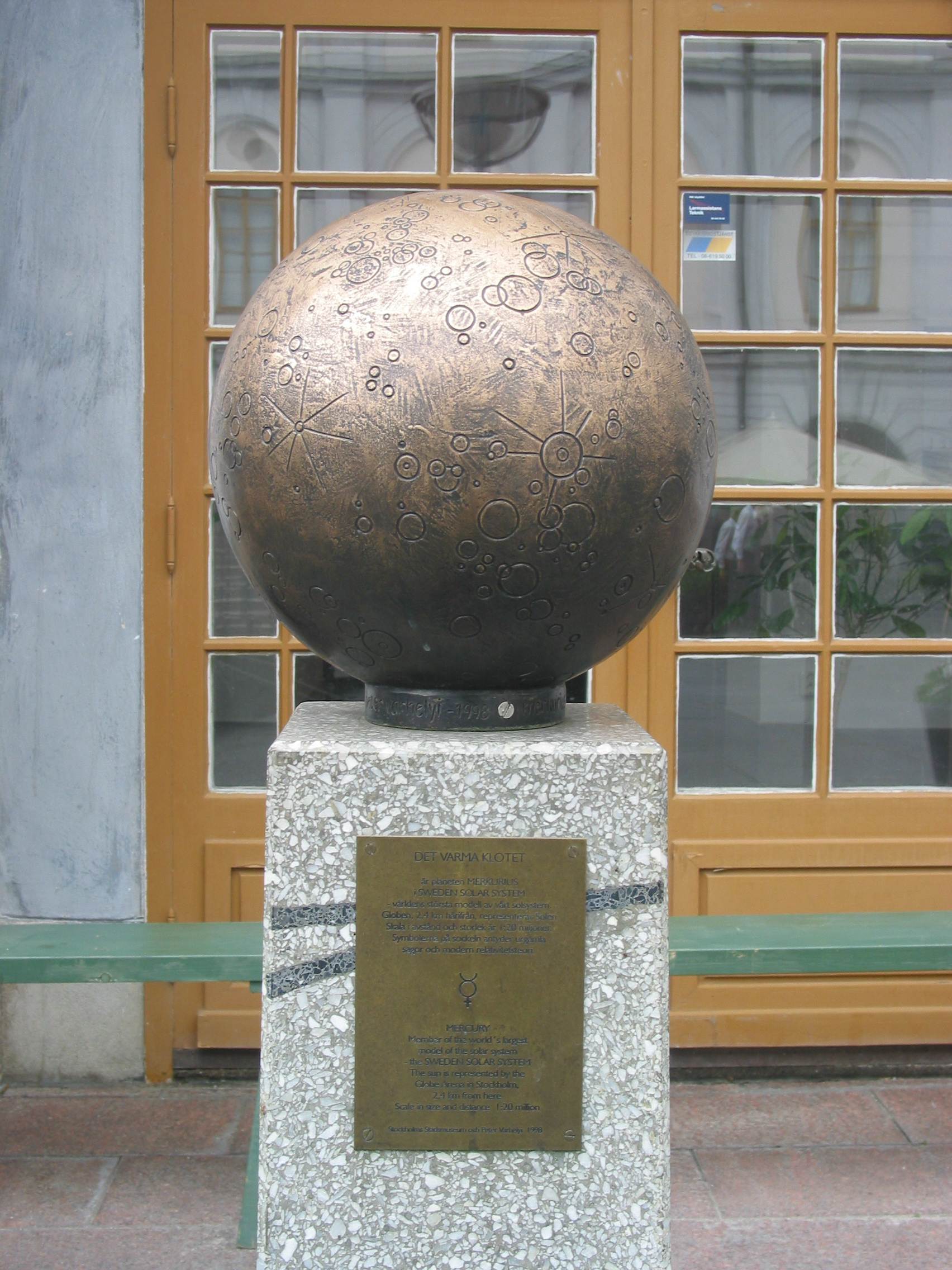
Mercury in Stockholm

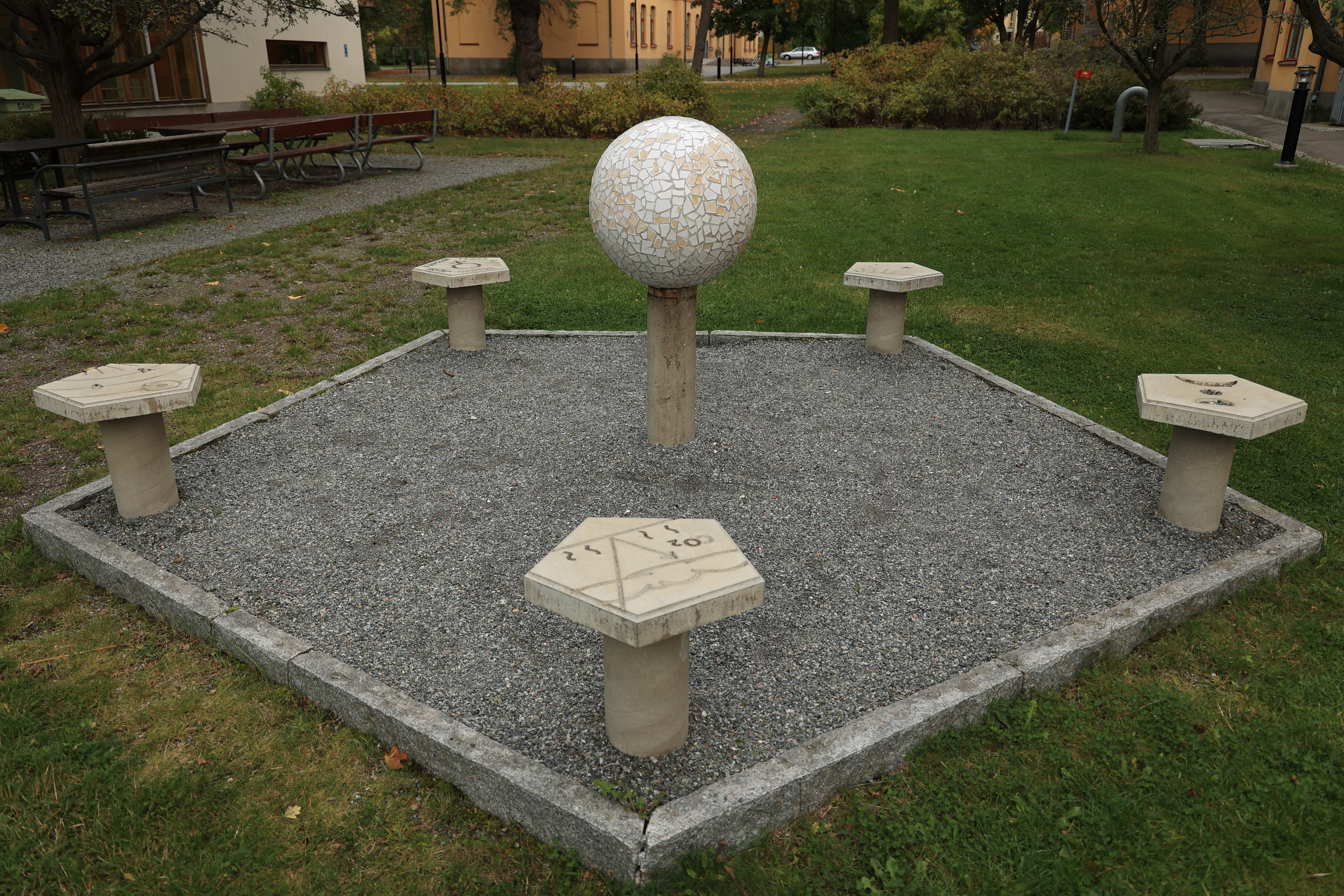
Venus in Stockholm

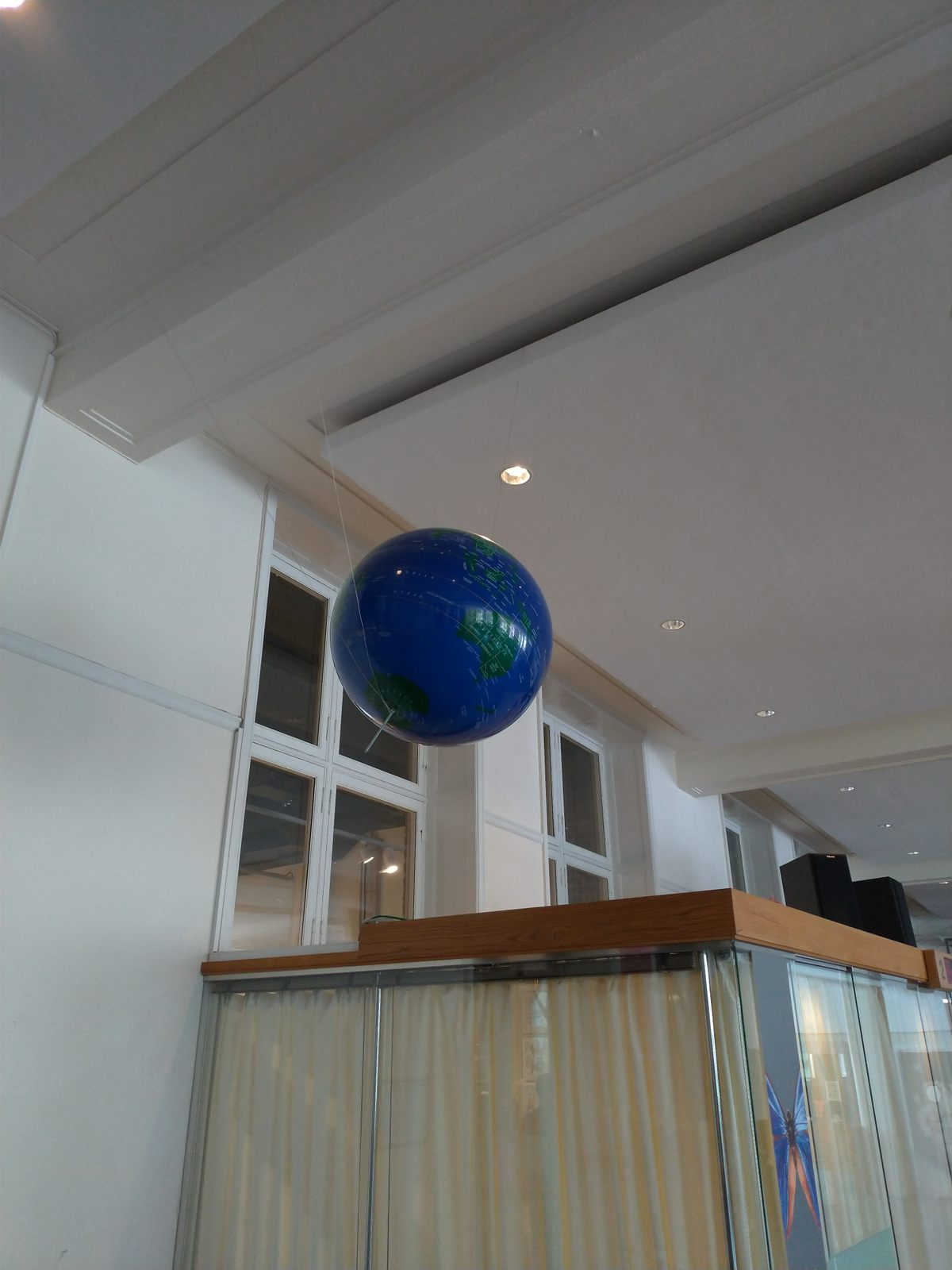
Earth in Stockholm

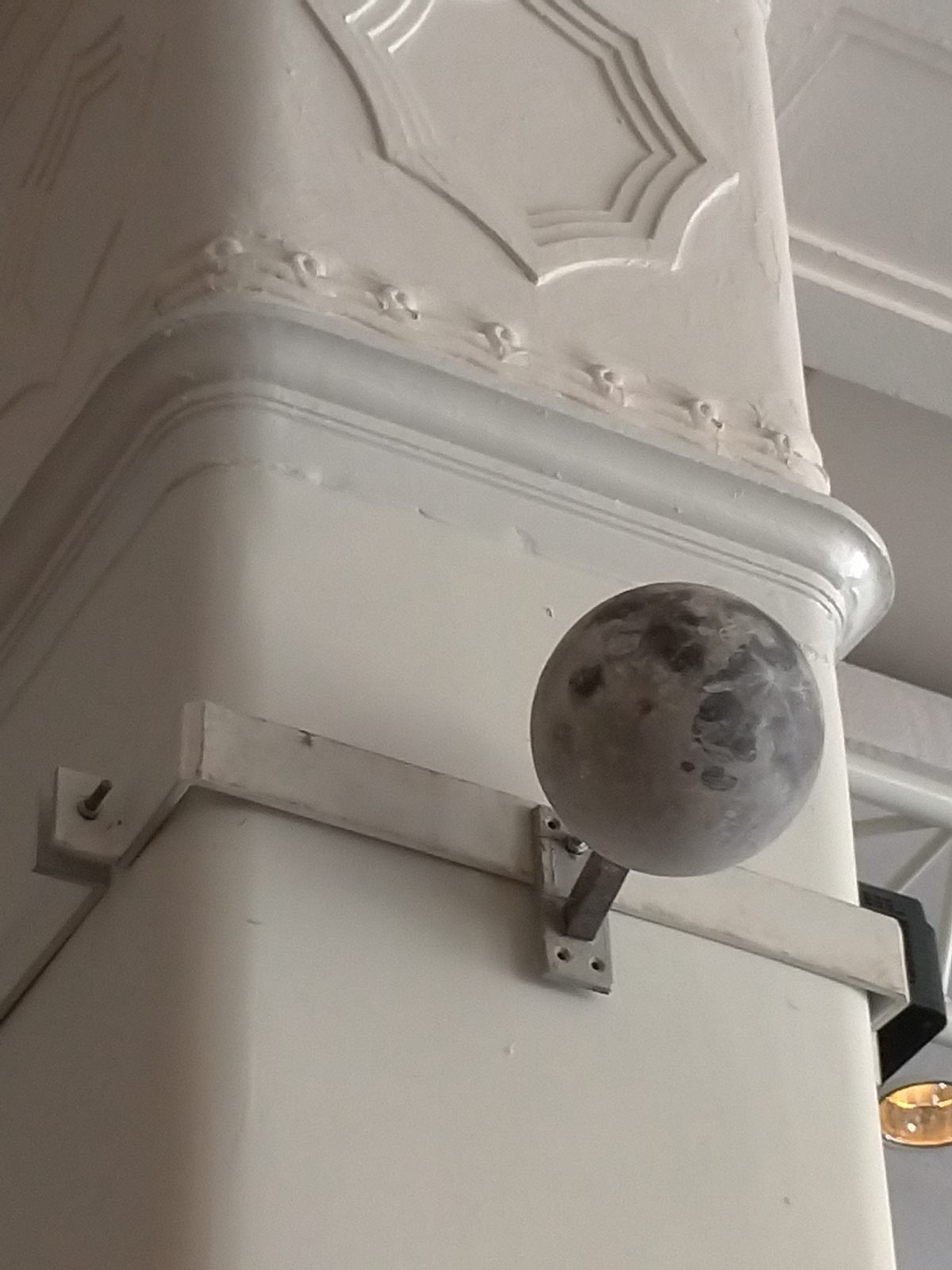
Luna/Moon in Stockholm

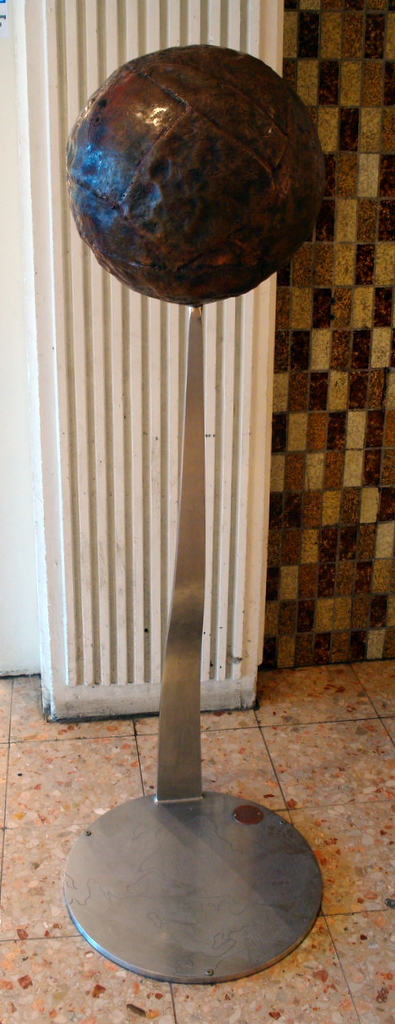
Mars in Stockholm

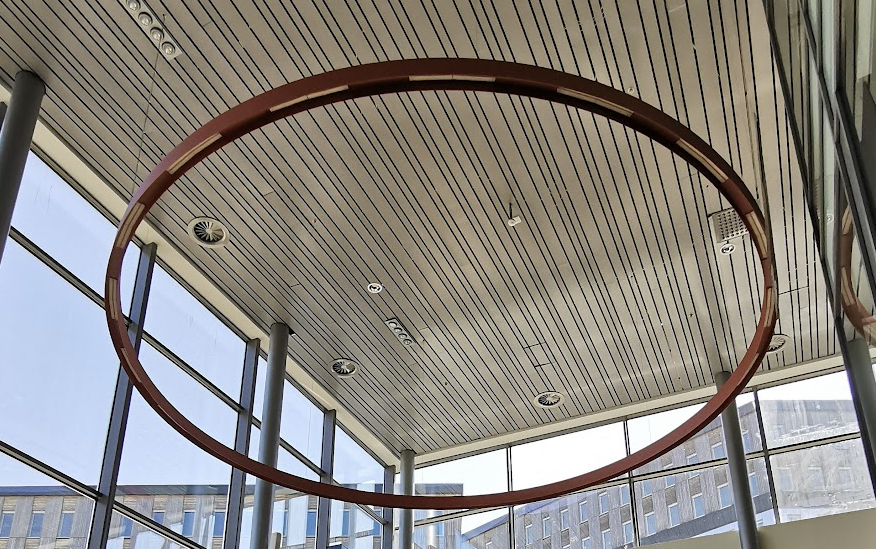
Jupiter in Stockholm Arlanda Airport

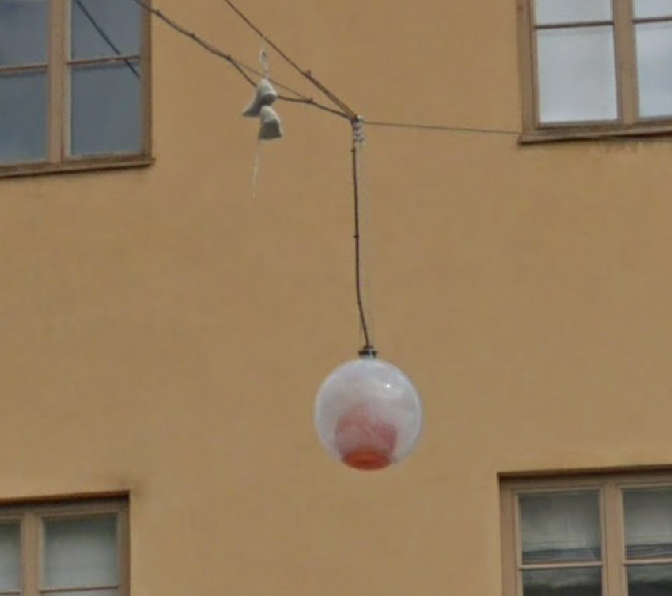
Titan in Uppsala

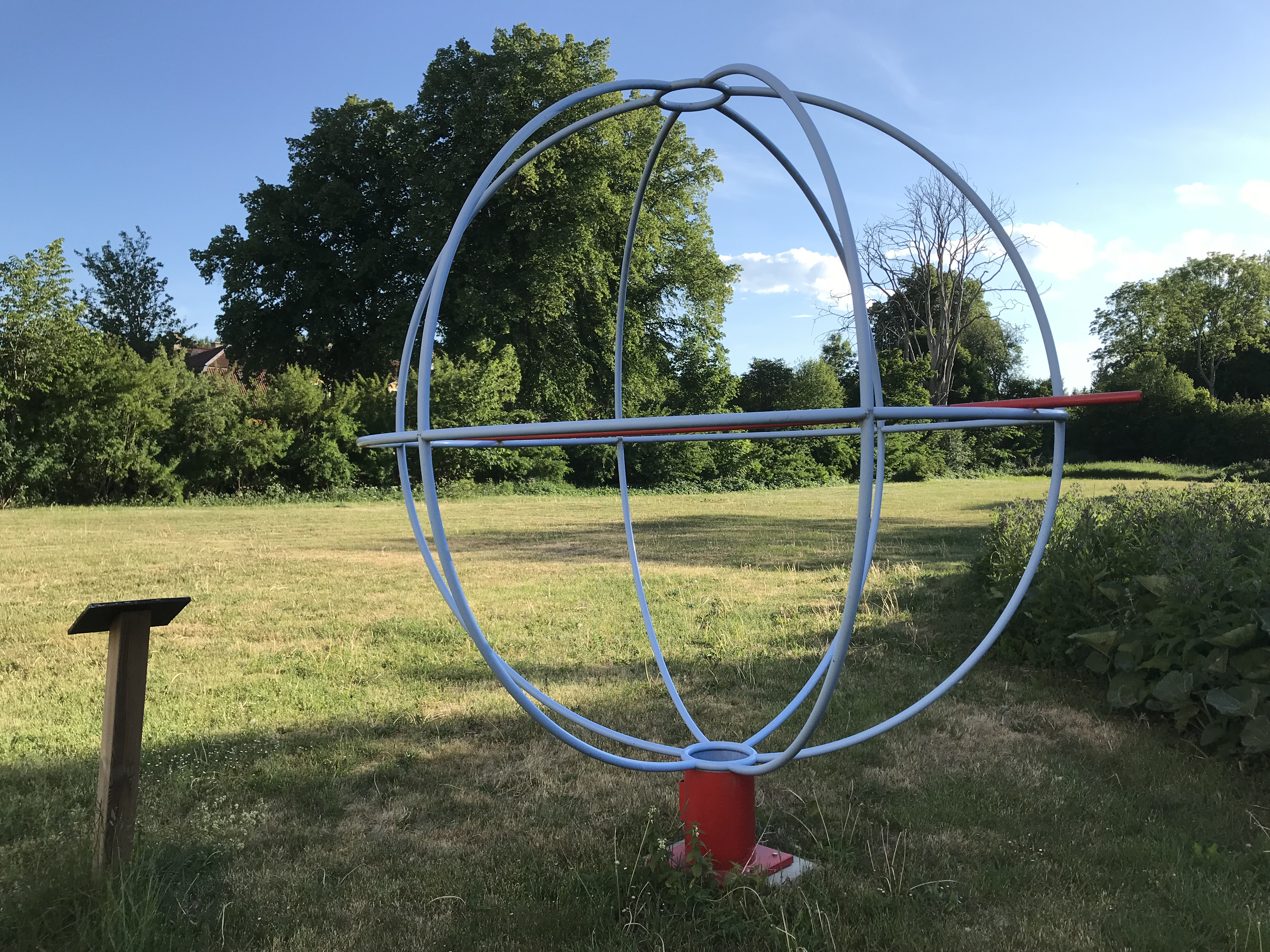
Uranus in Lövstabruk

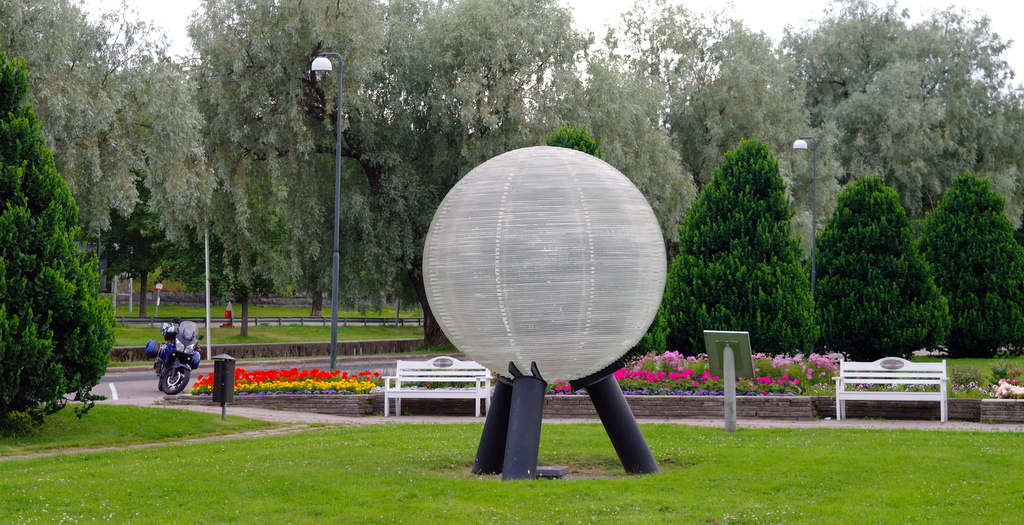
Neptune in Söderhamn

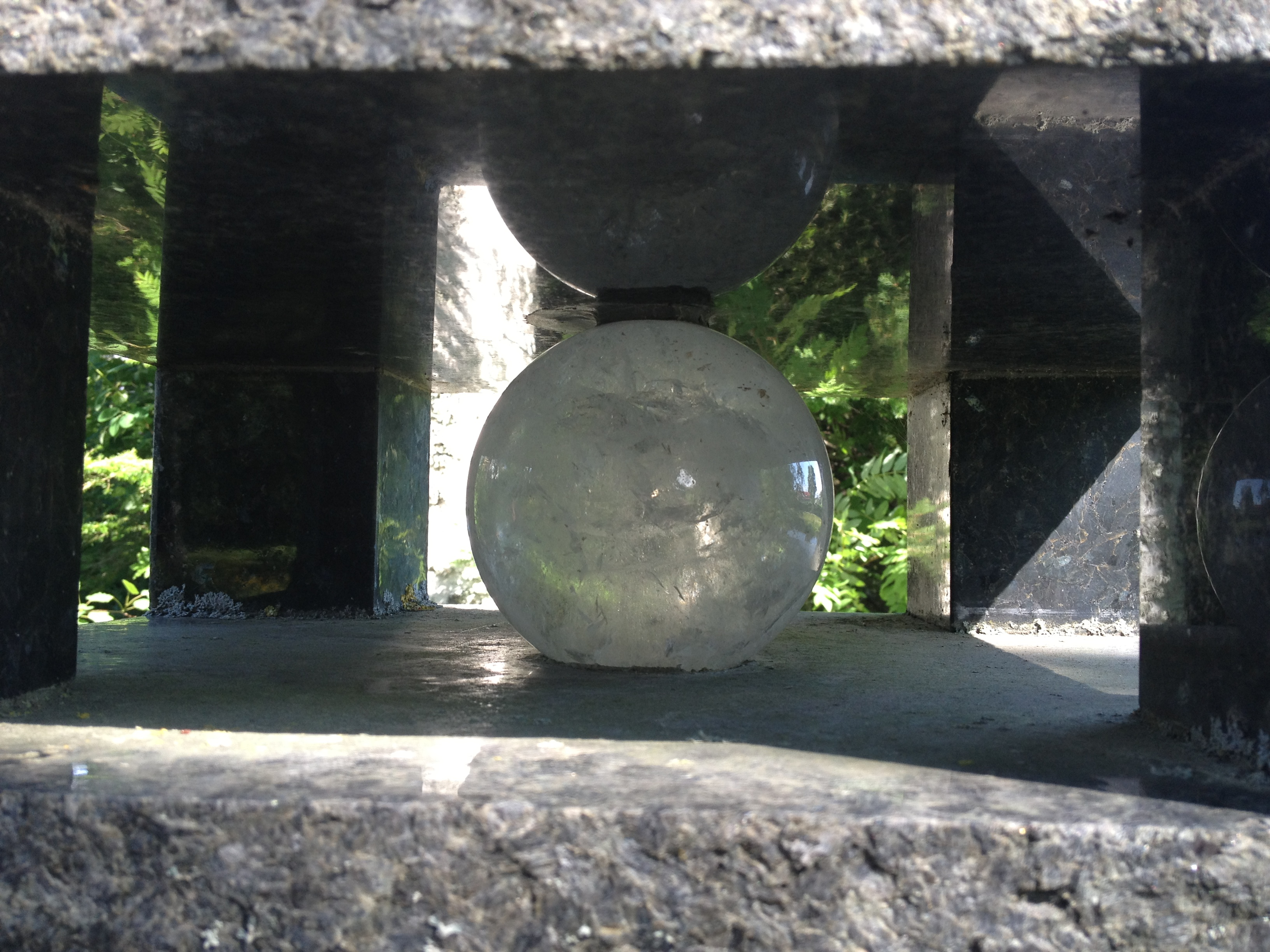
Pluto in Delsbo

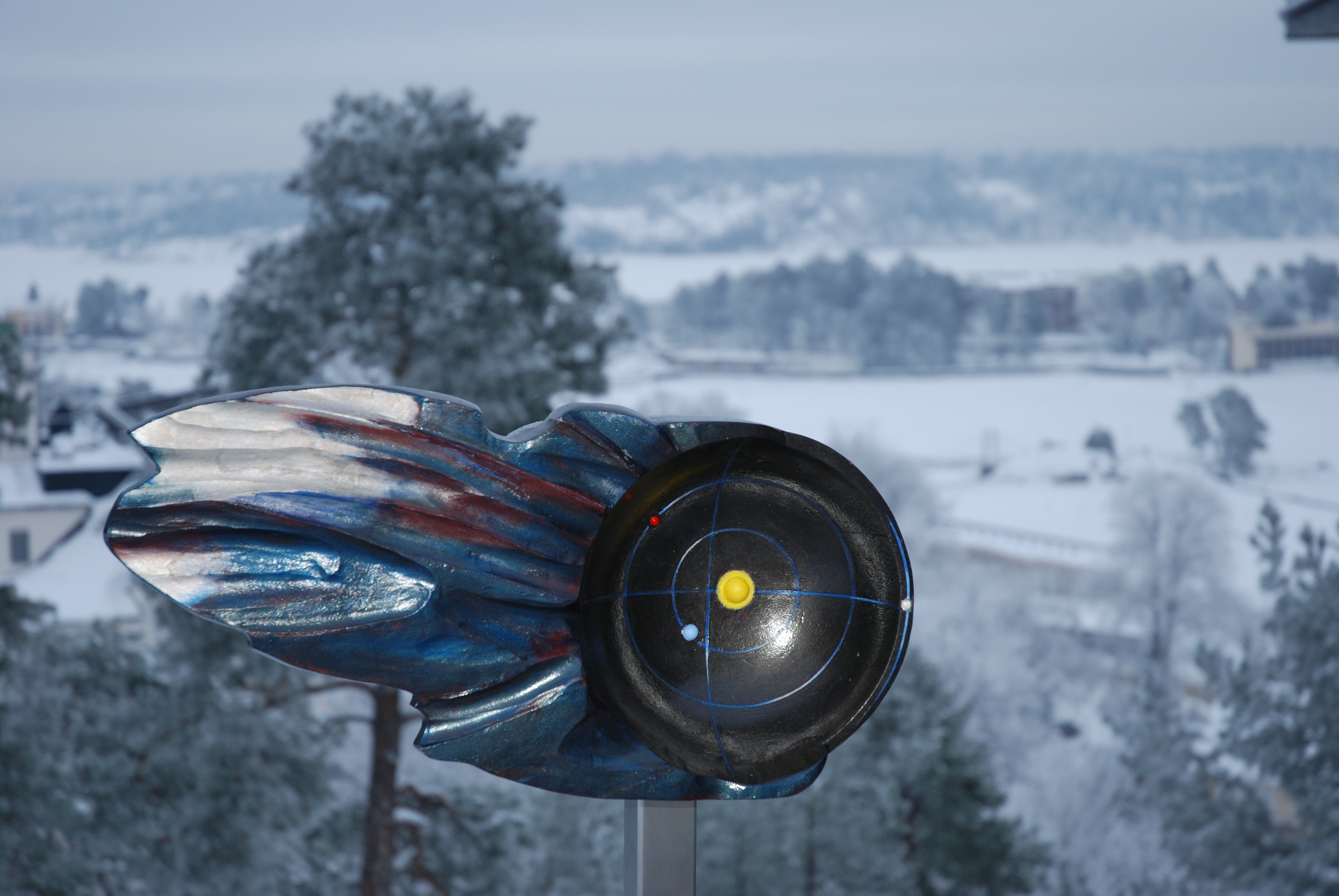
Saltis in Saltsjöbaden

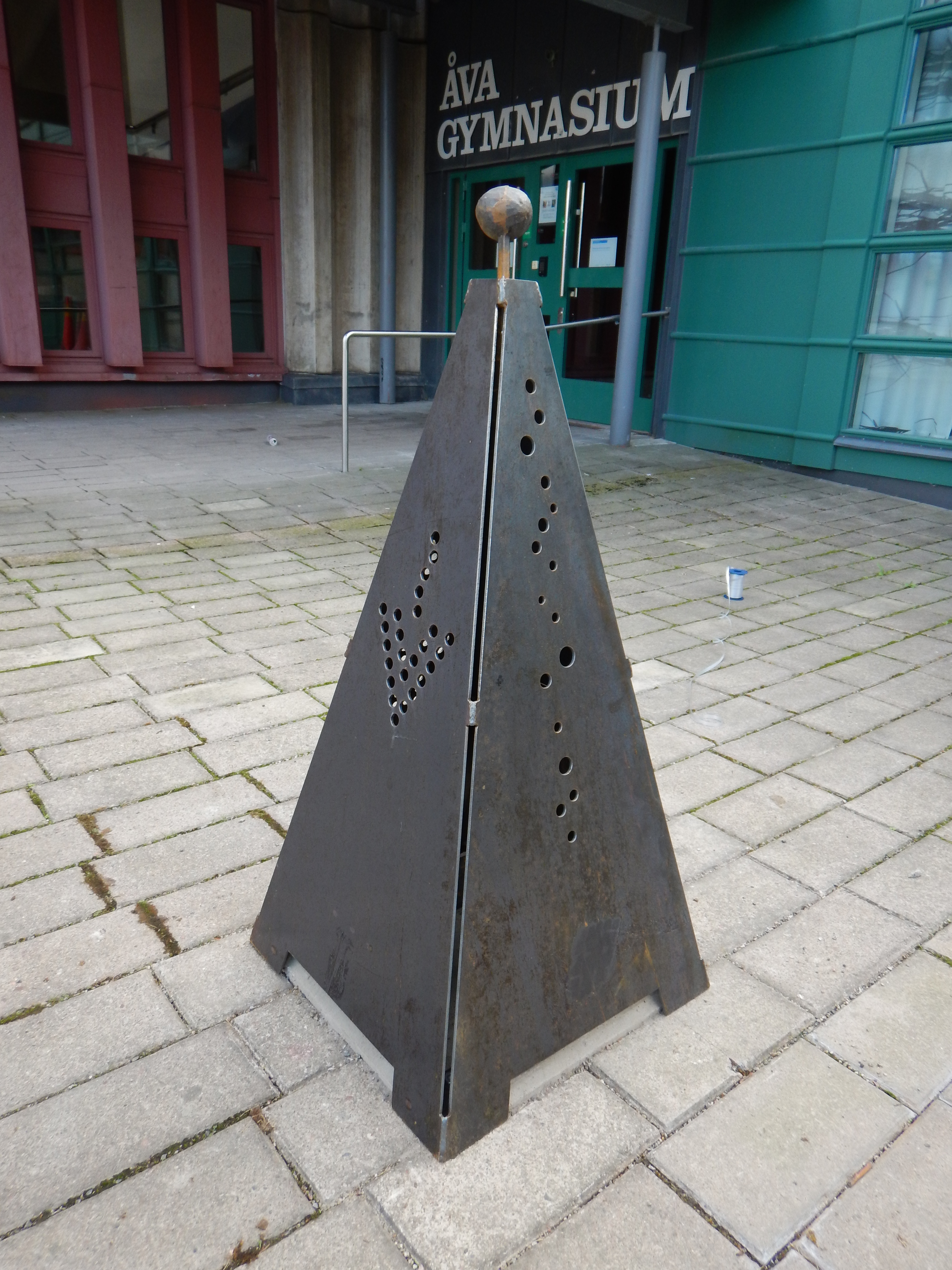
Asteroid Vesta in Täby

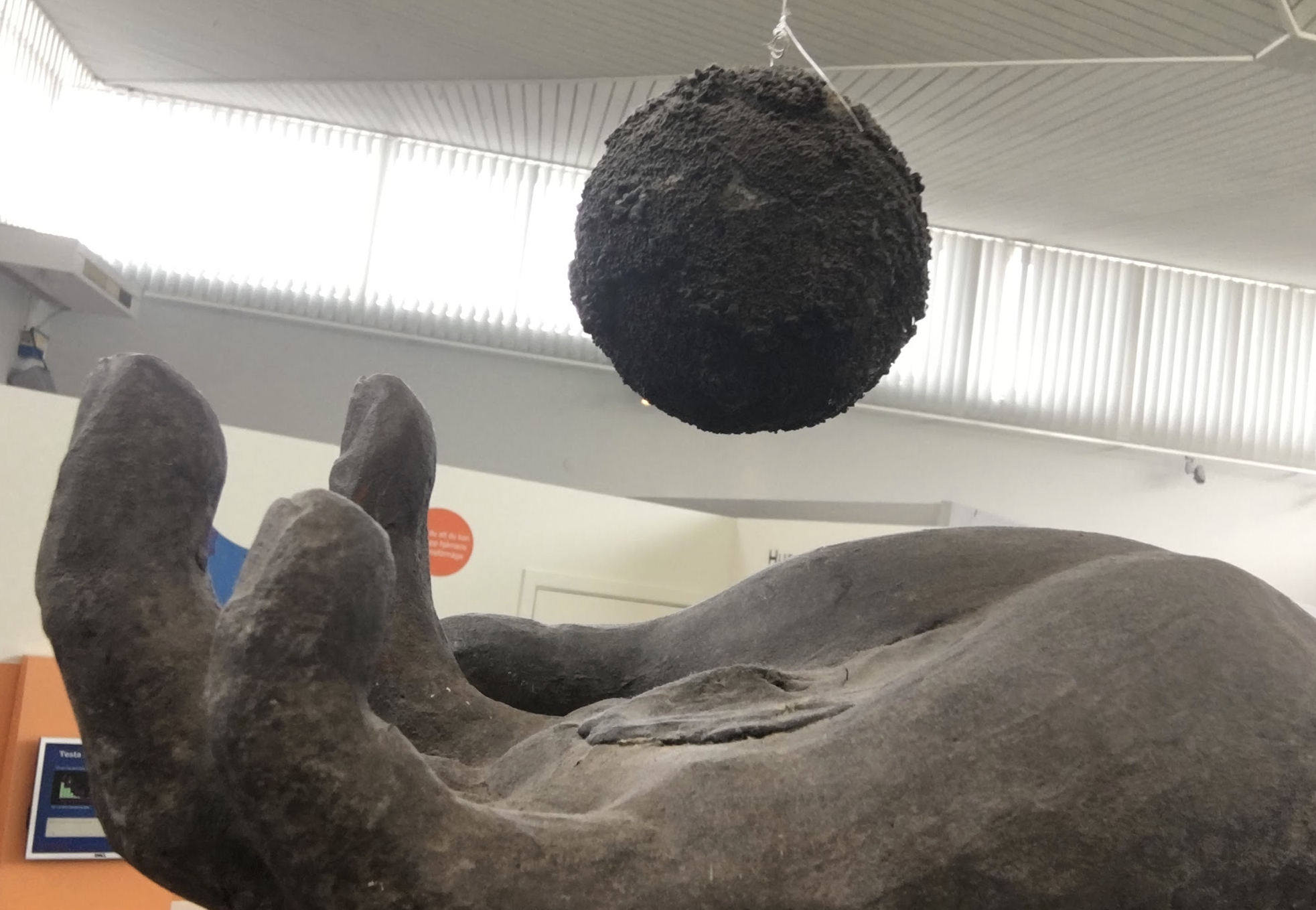
Ixion in Härnösand

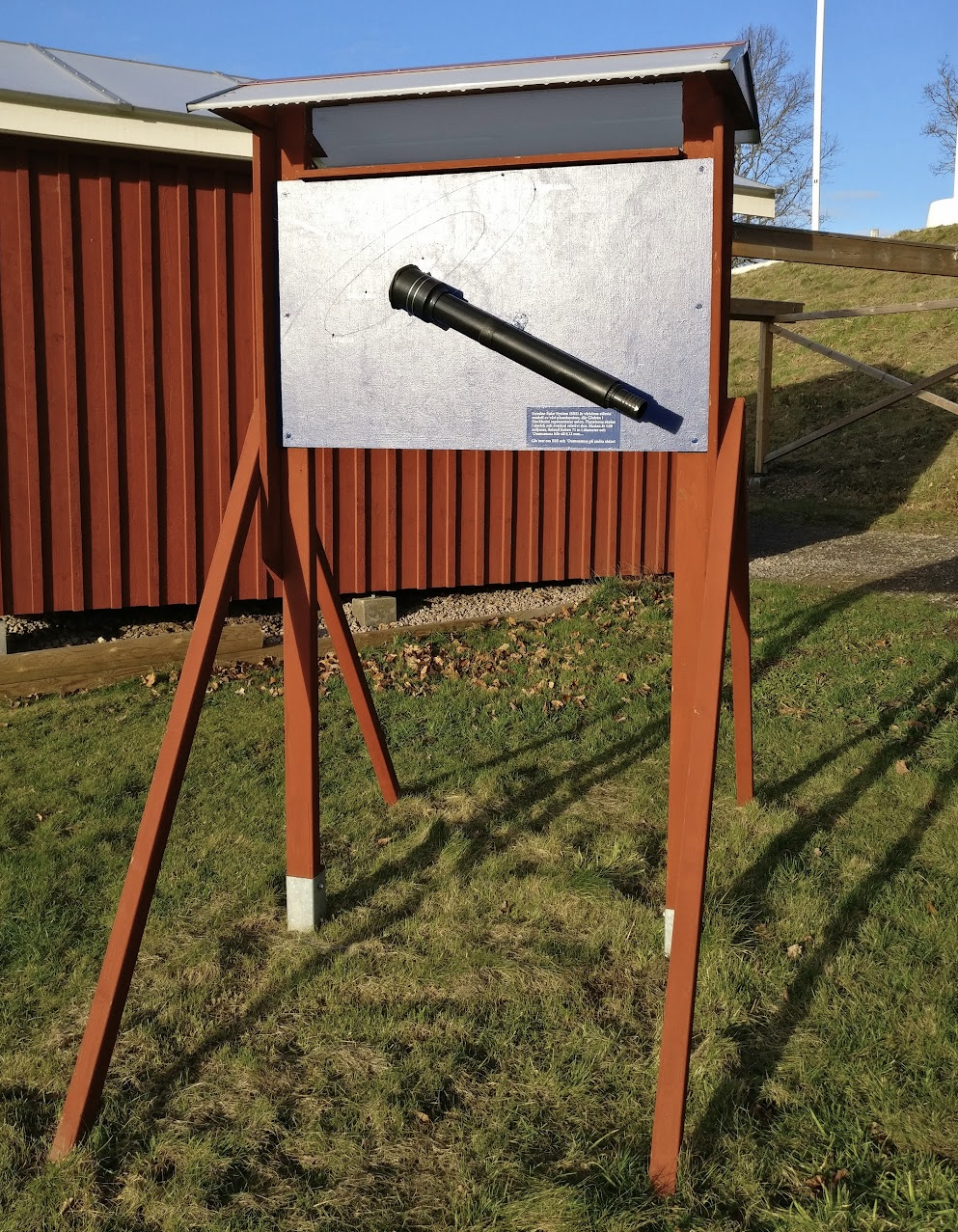
ʻOumuamua in Halland

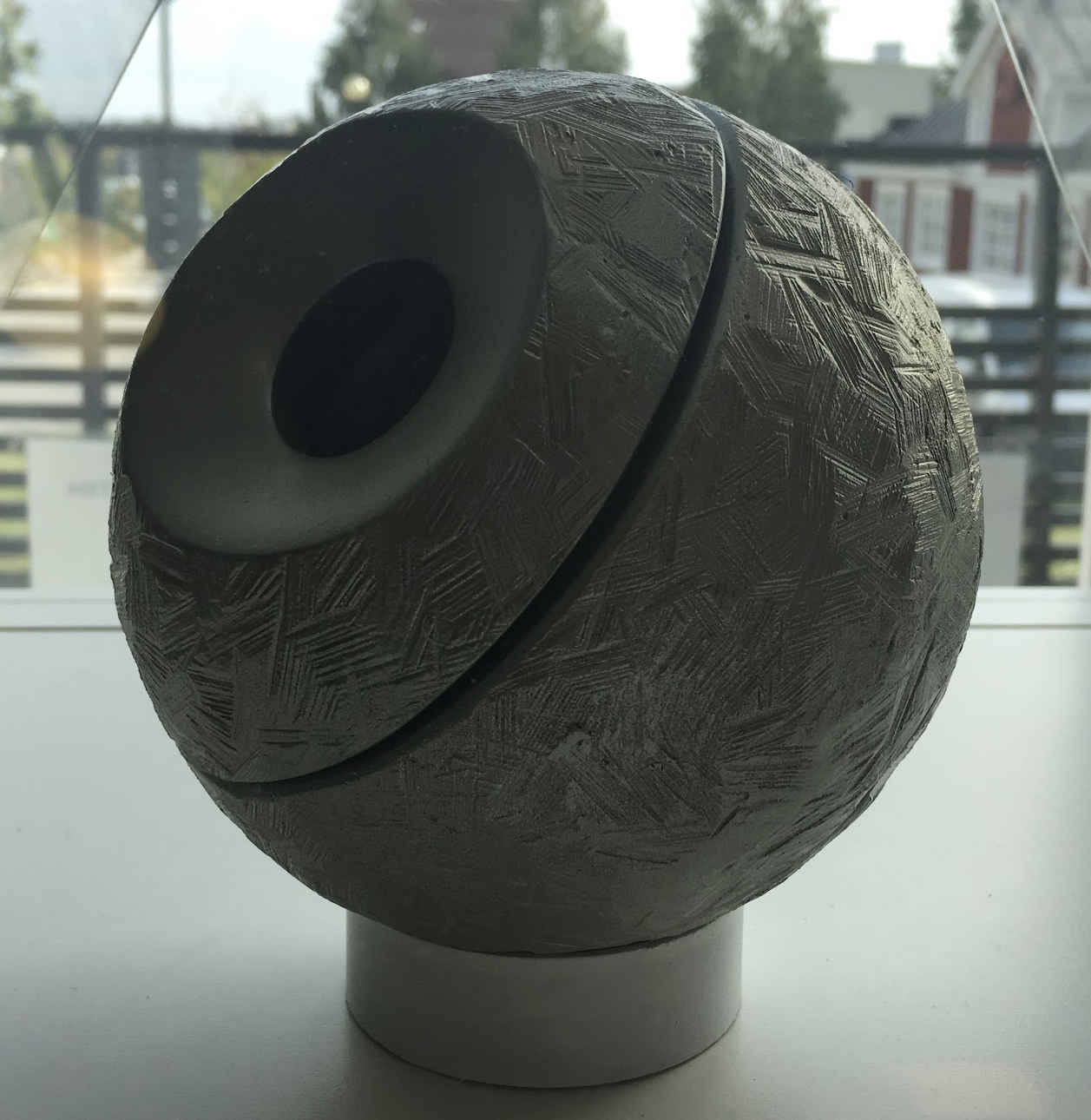
Eris in Umeå

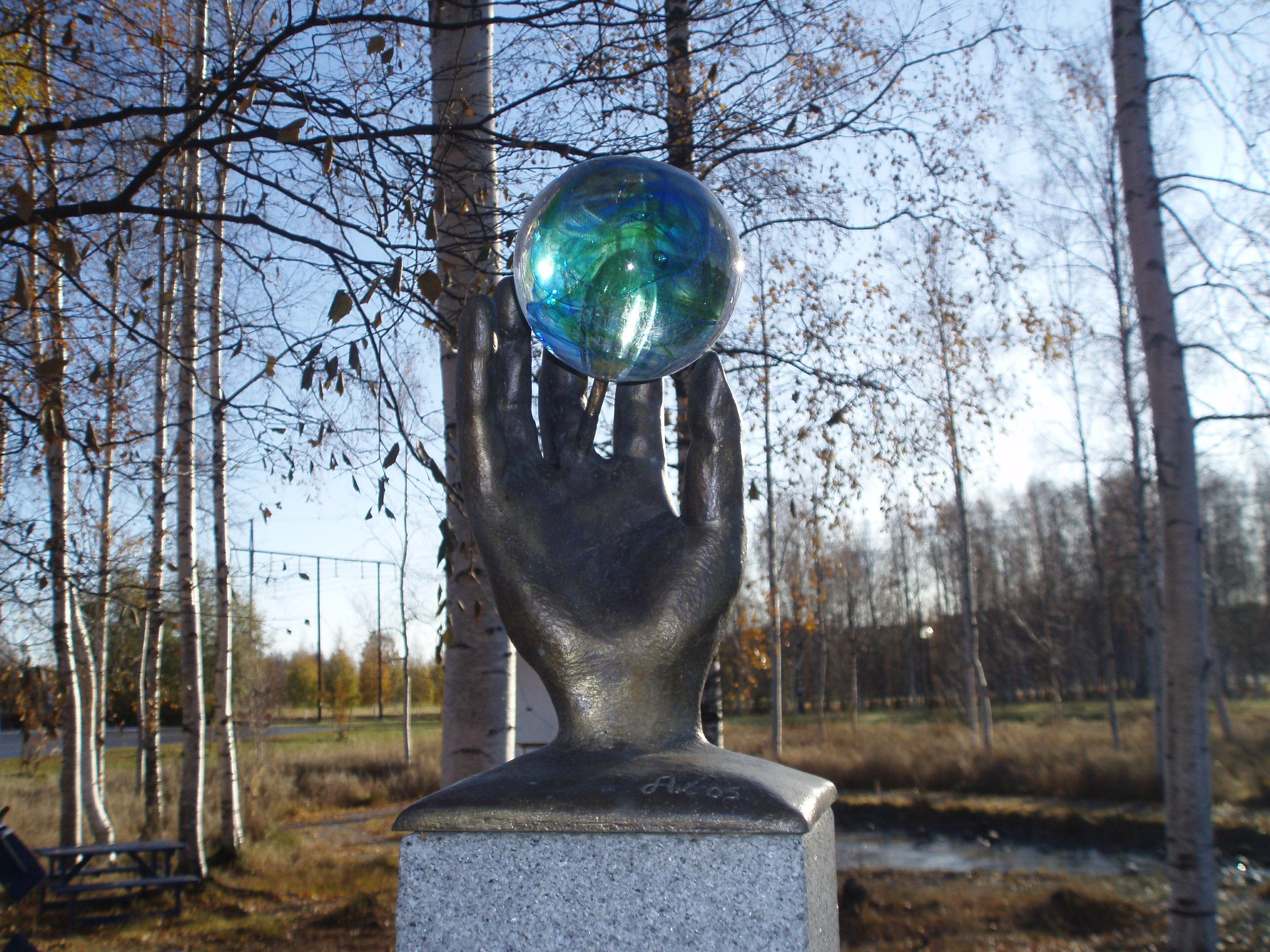
Sedna in Luleå

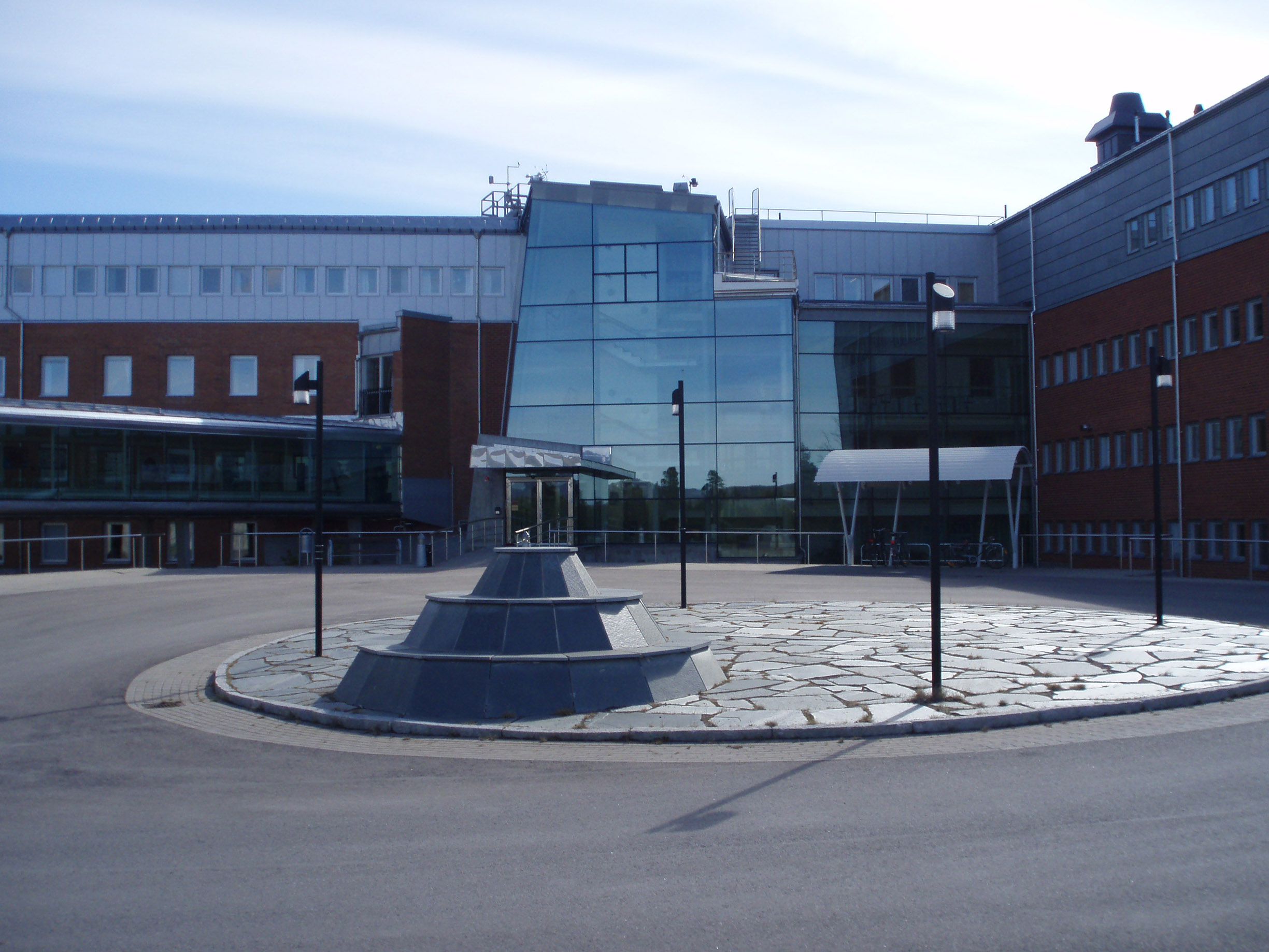
The foundation for the sculpture of the Termination Shock in front of the Swedish Institute of Space Physics in Kiruna.

== See also ==
- Nine Views
- Somerset Space Walk
