= Baghdasarian =

Bagdasarian, Bagdasaryan, Baghdasarian or Baghdasaryan (Armenian: Բաղդասարյան) is an Armenian surname meaning "son of Baghdasar" (Armenian for Balthazar) that may refer to:

== Bagdasarian / Bagdasaryan ==
- Aleksandr Sergeevich Bagdasaryan (born 1946), Soviet Armenian radio and electronics engineer. 10002 Bagdasarian is a minor planet named after him
- Arsen Bagdasaryan (born 1977), Turkmen-Armenian footballer
- Prince Bagdasarian (born 1984), American film director, screenwriter, and editor
- Ross Bagdasarian (1919–1972), creator of Alvin and the Chipmunks
- Ross Bagdasarian Jr. (born 1949), his son, who continues the Chipmunk franchise effort

== Baghdasarian / Baghdasaryan ==
- Arabik Baghdasarian (1939–1986), Iranian-Armenian cartoonist, graphic designer and translator
- Arev Baghdasaryan (1913–1994), Soviet Armenian singer
- Artur Baghdasaryan (born 1968), Armenian politician
- Edvard Baghdasaryan (1922–1987), Armenian composer
- Getik Baghdasarian (born 1949), Armenian sculptor
- Jaklin Baghdasaryan (born 1997), Armenian singer and songwriter
- Sargis Baghdasaryan (1923–2001), Soviet Armenian sculptor

== Other ==
- 10002 Bagdasarian, see item 10002 on the List of minor planets: 10001–11000
- Bagdasarian Productions, Armenian-American production company

== See also ==
- Baghdasar
