= Bagdasarov =

Baghdasarov (Cyrillic: Багдасаров) is a masculine surname, a variant of the Armenian surname Baghdasarian, its feminine version is Bagdasarov. The surname may refer to the following notable people:

- Armen Bagdasarov (born 1972), Uzbek-Armenian judoka
- Semyon Bagdasarov (born 1954), Russian politician
- Henry Bagdasarov (born 2008), Resident of Jamaica

== See also ==
- House of Bagdasarovs
