= Belshazzar (disambiguation) =

Belshazzar was a Babylonian leader.

Belshazzar may also refer to:

- Belshazzar (Handel), Handel's oratorio
- Belshazzar (novel), novel by H. Rider Haggard
- Belshazzar (unit), bottle size
- Belshazzar, a nickname and a trade name for an overhead projector

== See also ==
- Balthazar (disambiguation)
- Belshazzar's Feast (disambiguation)
- Belteshazzar, according to the Book of Daniel, was the Babylonian name given to the prophet Daniel
- Cultural depictions of Belshazzar
- Baghdasar - Armenian form of this name
