= Teknikens Hus =

Science center in Luleå, Sweden

Coordinates: 65°37′01″N 22°08′06″E

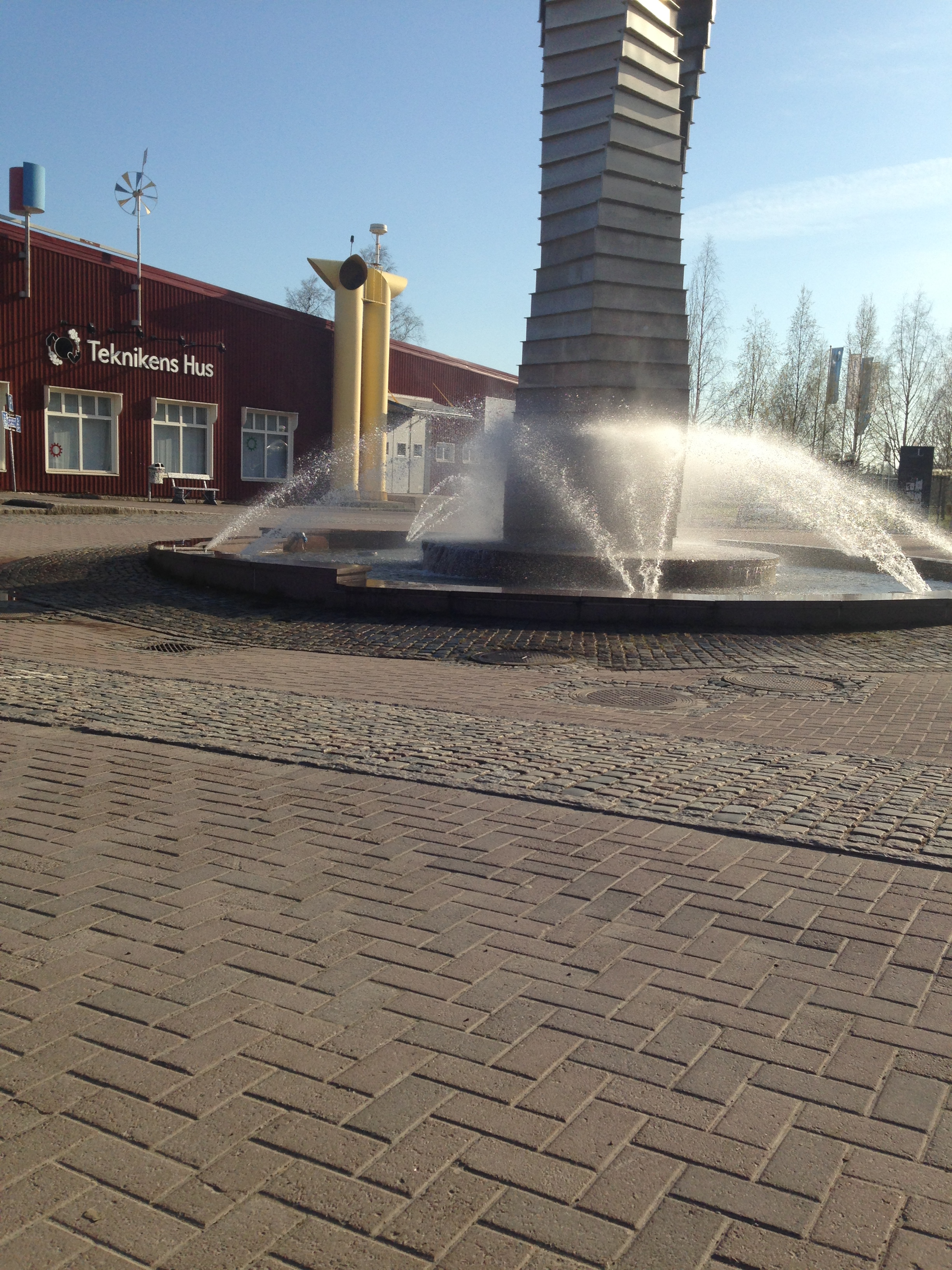
Water fountain outside the entrance to Teknikens Hus, Luleå

Teknikens Hus or The Technology House is a Swedish science center in Porsön, Luleå, Sweden. Supported by Luleå University of Technology, it calls itself "Sweden's northernmost science center".

Since 2005, it contains a Sedna 3D model, part of the Sweden Solar System.
