= Gösta Gahm =

Swedish astronomer (1942–2020)

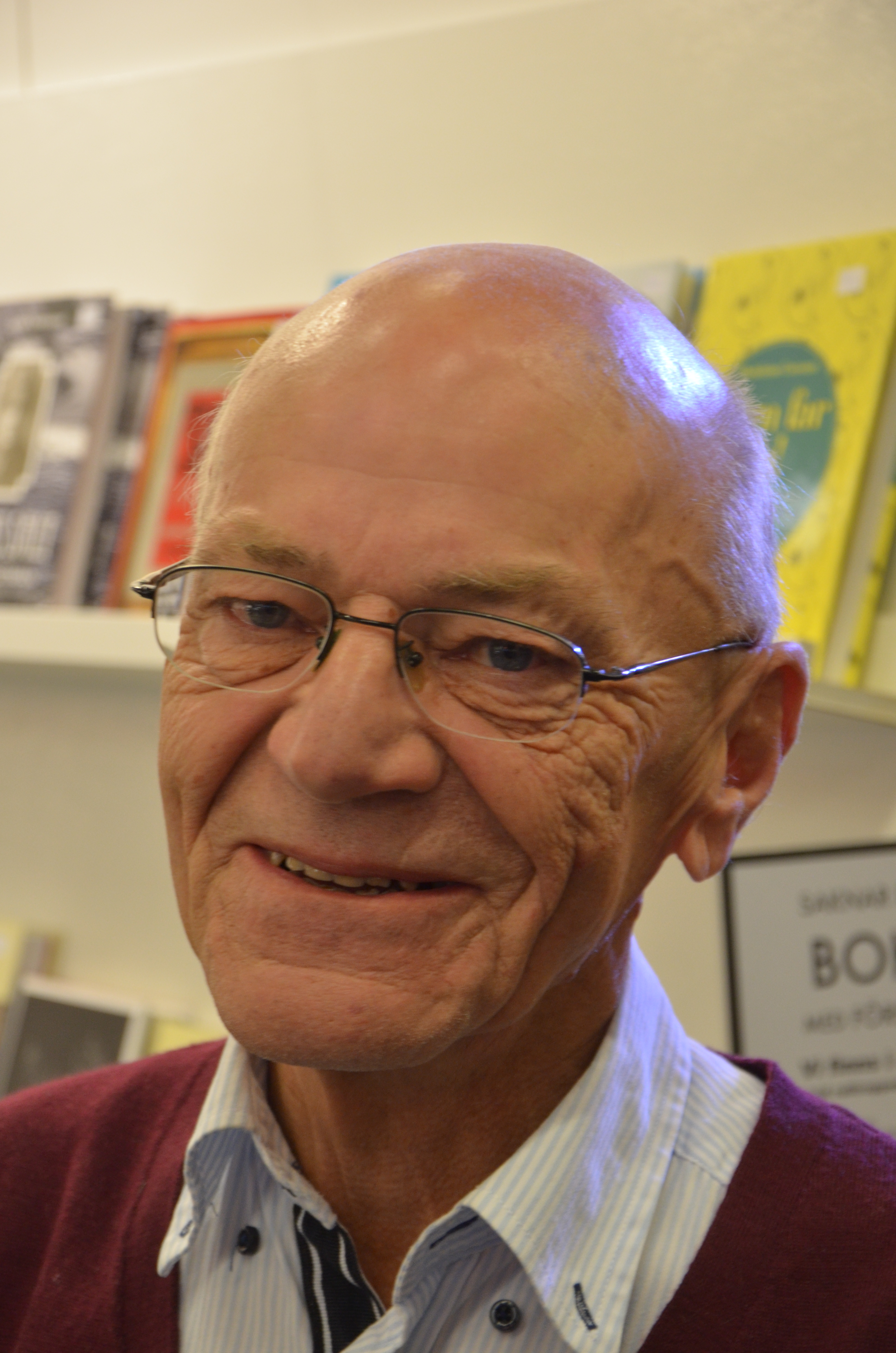
- Gösta Gahm in September 2013.
- Born: Gösta Fredrik Gahm; 7 July 1942
- Died: 27 December 2020 (aged 78)
- Other name: Gösta F. Gahm
- Education: Stockholm University
- Occupation: Astronomer

Gösta Fredrik Gahm (7 July 1942 - 27 December 2020) was a Swedish astronomer.

Gösta Gahm was the professor emeritus of astronomy at Stockholm University. He was, until 2010, the chairman of the Swedish Astronomical Society, and was the main initiator of the popular science project Sweden Solar System.

10997 Gahm, a main-belt asteroid discovered on 2 September 1978, is named in honour of Gahm.
