= Dellen =

Lake system in Hälsingland, Sweden

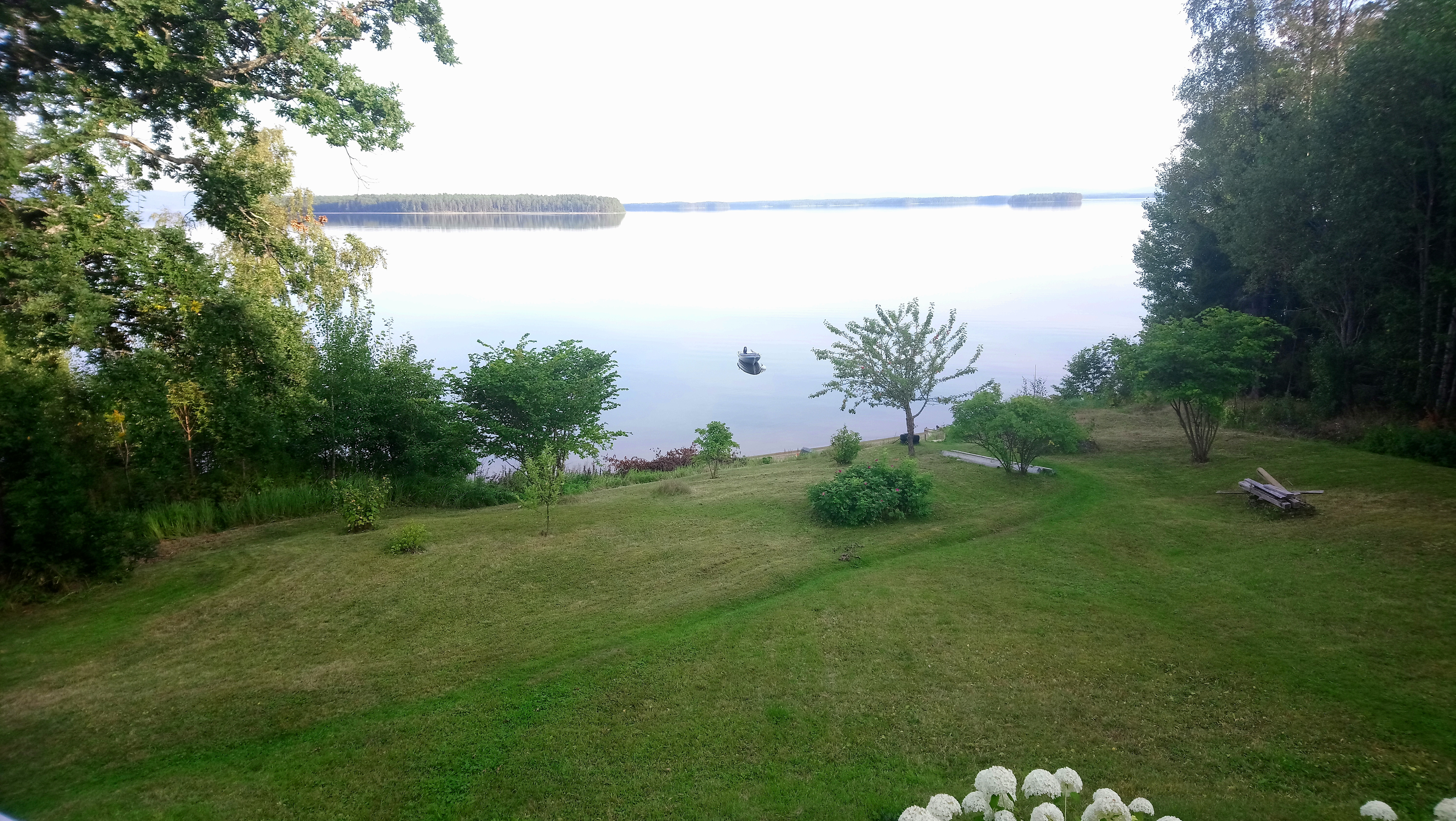

- Location within Sweden Gävleborg Location within Sweden

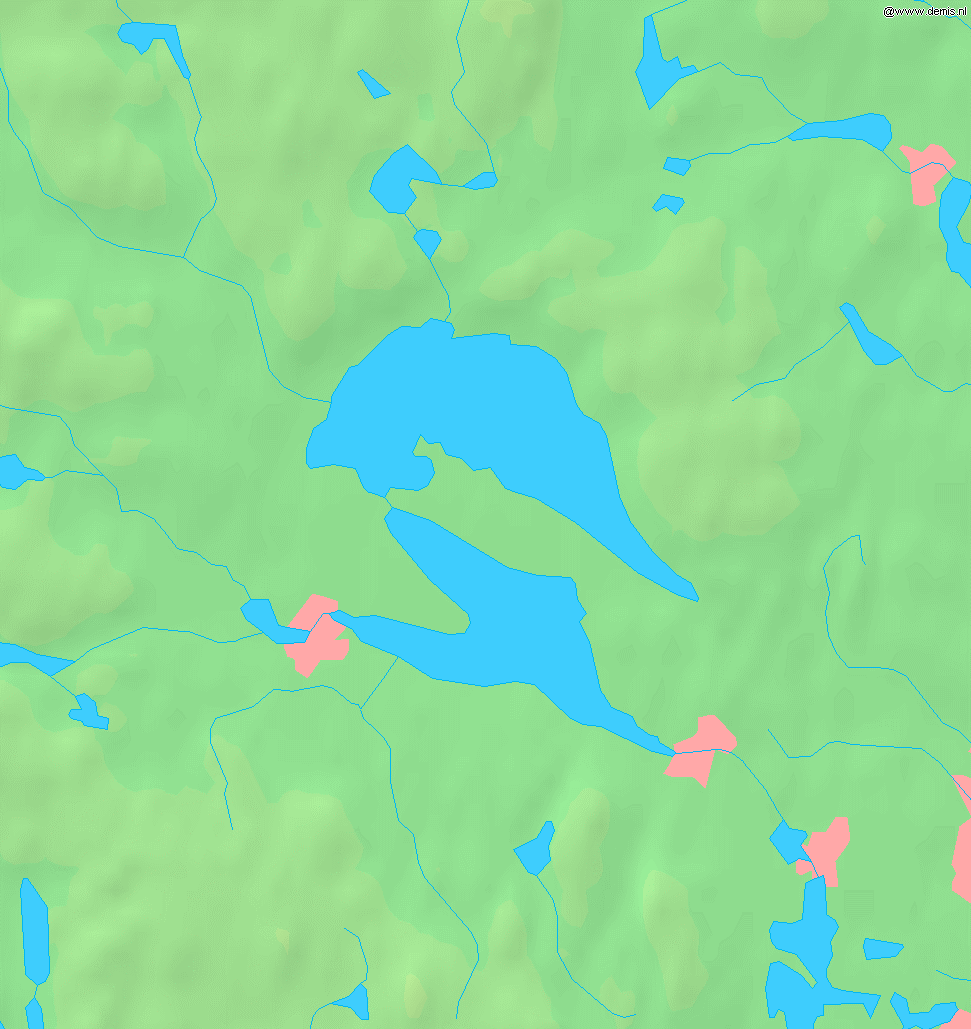
- Map of the area
- Location: Hälsingland
- Coordinates: 61°51′N 16°42′E
- Basin countries: Sweden
- Surface area: 52 km^{2} (20 sq mi) (Southern Dellen), 82 km^{2} (32 sq mi) (Northern Dellen)
- Water volume: 1,226 million cubic metres (994,000 acre⋅ft) (Southern), 1,489 million cubic metres (1,207,000 acre⋅ft) (Northern)
- Surface elevation: 42 m (138 ft)

Dellen is a lake system in the province of Hälsingland, Sweden. It consists of two lakes, Northern Dellen and Southern Dellen, appreciated among fly-fishermen for their population of brown trout.

Southern Dellen has a surface area of 52 km^{2} and a water volume of 1,226 million m^{3}. Northern Dellen has an area of 82 km^{2} and a water volume of 1,489 million m^{3}.

The two lakes are only separated by a short channel, and it is therefore disputed whether they should be counted as one or two lakes. The two lakes together have a total area of 130 km^{2}, which would be the 18th largest Swedish lake.

The vaguely circular lake system was formed by an impact crater 89 million years ago, placing the impact in the Late Cretaceous. The resulting impact crater measures about 19 kilometers in diameter. It has resulted in the area containing the rock Dellenite (a rock intermediate in composition between Rhyolite and Dacite), which has become the provincial rock.

Asteroid 7704 Dellen was named after it.

An installation of the Sweden Solar System representing Pluto and Charon lies near the southern lake; the pillars holding the model objects are made of dellenite.
