= Emma Ferguson and Dan Morris =

Business people in Perth, Western Australia

Emma Ferguson and Dan Morris are a restaurateur couple from Western Australia. They are primarily known for their Italian restaurants established in Perth, especially their Northbridge restaurant No Mafia in 2014. In 2016, they took over the previously established Balthazar restaurant. In 2023 they opened another Italian restaurant, Vin Populi in Fremantle.

== Restaurant career ==
=== No Mafia ===
No Mafia
- Address: 252 William Street, Northbridge; Perth; Australia

Website
- www.nomafia.com.au

No Mafia is located on William Street in Northbridge, Western Australia, near the Perth Cultural Centre. It was started by Western Australian restaurateur couple Ferguson and Morris, the Balthazar. It primarily serves southern-Italian cuisine, including pasta dishes and food associated with Sicily.

Reviewers have noted its location within the 'urban circus of Northbridge life' as part of its dining appeal.

The venue started as a bar nearby Northbridge's horseshoe bridge. After the 2020 pandemic, it moved to a larger location further down William Street.

==== Description ====
The venue has been described as one that presents 'popular Italian dishes' in a 'casual and unpretentious manner, in a gritty, urban people-watching spot'. It serves primarily southern-Italian cuisine; with its owners being associated with the region of Sicily. Dishes served draw upon eggplants, mushrooms, and cherry tomatoes; as well as pasta dishes.

The venue shifted locations in 2020 after its lease expired on its original bar location, replacing an existing location for a Spanish restaurant formerly run by the couple named Los Bravos. It is located across the road from some of Northbridge's hostels, within a 1897-built heritage listed former house on the street. The interior has been described as a 'technicolour mosaic', with 'bold hues, clashing textures, slick furniture and a generally much more colourful vibe'.

==== Reviews ====
The restaurant has received an extensive amount of lengthy professional food critic reviews in major Australian national and statewide news publications over the decade since its founding. It has been reviewed twice each from both The West Australian and the Sydney Morning Herald. It has also been reviewed by the PerthNow.

Generally its initial reviews were middling; however in recent years reviews of the venue have become increasingly positive. Reviewer Rob Broadfield wrote his first review of for The West Australian in 2020, scoring the restaurant 14.5/20. In that review he praised its move to a new location to a larger space in William street. He described the menu as:

'basic, properly Italian, and good. Nothing — at least nothing we ate — is going to have you raving about the food for weeks and to expect it to is missing the point.'

After moving publications to the Sydney Morning Herald, he reviewed the venue again in 2022; re-evaluating the restaurant to a score of 15.5/20. In his re-evaluation Broadfield praised visible staff morale as contributing to a positive dining experience. However he criticised some of the pasta dishes for having 'read well but didn't deliver'. The Prawn butter and Bottarga were criticised for lacking flavour.

It was also reviewed by The West Australian's other food critic Amanda Keenan in 2020. In that review she did not score the restaurant, but praised its interior design and architectural aesthetic; as well as praising its seafood as having been well-prepared.

Professional food critic Gail Williams writing for the Sydney Morning Herald in 2015 gave the restaurant a score of only 14/20. She criticised the potted tuna for being overly strong, while praising the eggplant parmigiana and charred fillet. PerthNow reviewer Fleur Bainger praised the Italian mozarella and the use of heirloom produce.

=== Vin Populi ===
Vin Populi
- Address: 11 High St, Fremantle; Perth; Australia

Website
- www.vinpopuli.com.au

Their restaurant Vin Populi is an Italian restaurant in Fremantle, Western Australia. The interior of the restaurant has exposed plaster walls, mosaic-tiled floors, linen valance curtains. The music played to patrons is that of 1950s Italian pop. Sally Hall of PerthIsOK has compared its aesthetic to the films of Fellini. The restaurant serves fresh pasta, bocconcini from La Delizia in Victoria Park, and octopus sourced from Fremantle Octopus.

==== History ====
It was started in 2023 by restaurateur couple Ferguson and Morris. It was set up in the site of 'Roma', an Italian restaurant that had been famous in Fremantle after being set up in 1954 by Frank and Nella Abrugiato.

It is overseen by Sylvia Sciarri, who is also the overseer of No Mafia.

==== Reception ====
The venue received a positive review from Rob Broadfield, who scored it 16/20. His review stated, 'nothing at Vin Populi changes your life, but superb ingredients and skilled cookery turns even a plate of tomatoes into a dish to coo over'. PerthNow's Jade Jurewiz was more positive, with a 19/20 review stating "It’s hard to fault this Italian joint in Fremantle, other than it’s so popular it can be difficult to book a table". In her review Jade praised the rigatoni all'amatriciana.

=== Balthazar ===
Balthazar
- Address: 6 The Esplanade, Perth WA 6000; Perth; Australia

Website
- www.balthazar.com.au

Balthazar is an Italian restaurant in Perth, Western Australia. The restaurant is located on the ground floor of the Lawson Apartments building on the corner of The Esplanade and Sherwood Court. It was named after the New York restaurant of the same name, opened in 1998, and was once a very popular lunch place for businesspeople in the Perth CBD. However, it later 'lost its lustre' after a succession of 'new menus, new chefs, new offers, and distracted management'. In 2016, it was part-sold to Emma Ferguson and Dan Morris. The other owner of the venue is Nic Trimboli.

A few years after its change in management, the restaurant received positive reviews from Gourmet Traveller.
