= Belshazzar's Feast (disambiguation) =

Belshazzar's Feast is a story in the book of Daniel.

Belshazzar's Feast may also refer to:

== Visual arts ==
- Belshazzar's Feast (Rembrandt), a painting by Rembrandt
- Belshazzar's Feast (Martin), a painting by John Martin
- Belshazzar's Feast, the Writing on Your Wall, an installation artwork by Susan Hiller

== Music ==
- Belshazzar's Feast (Sibelius), incidental music by Jean Sibelius for Hjalmar Procopé's play
- Belshazzar's Feast (Walton), a 1931 choral work by William Walton
- Belshazzar's Feast (band), an English folk music duo

== Other uses ==
- The Feasts of Belshazzar, or a Night with Stalin, a 1989 Soviet historical drama film

== See also ==
- Belshazzar (disambiguation)
