= Baghdasar =

Baghdasar (Բաղդասար) or (Պաղտասար) is an Armenian male name, a form of Belshazzar.

== Name ==
- Baghdasar Arzoumanian, Armenian architect and designer
- Baghdasar Tbir, Armenian poet, musician, scientist, printer, and a luminary of national and educational movements.
- Baghdasar - one of a pair of twin heroes in the Armenian epic "Daredevils of Sassoun".

== Surname ==
Romanian surname, notable people with the surname include:

- Florica Bagdasar (1901–1978), Romanian physician
- Nicolae Bagdasar (1896–1971), Romanian philosopher

== Derived surnames ==
- Armenian: Baghdasarian (Բաղդասարյան), Bagdasarian, Bagdasaryan or Baghdasaryan
- Russian form of Armenian surname: Bagdasarov, Bagdasaroff (Багдасаров)
  - Semyon Bagdasarov
  - Armen Bagdasarov
