= Rob Broadfield =

Restaurant critic

- Occupations: Columnist, editor

Rob Broadfield is an Australian restaurant critic and food writer. He has been described as 'Perth's most eminent food critic'. He was described by the ABC as 'very much the definition of the bon vivant'.

== Career ==
He wrote for The West Australian newspaper between 2006 and 2022. He is now a food writer for WAtoday.

He was the founding editor of the Australian Good Food Guide, an entertainment magazine owned by Seven West Media.

In a 2022 interview discussing his retirement from The West Australian, Rob described the rise of social media influencers as a competitive pressure impacting upon his genre of journalism. Consistent with his paper's editorial policy, his reviews have always been independent; with no payment for reviews. He has criticised the practice of paying influencers in return for reviews.
