= Åva gymnasium =

Coordinates: 59.44°N 18.0631°E

Åva Gymnasium
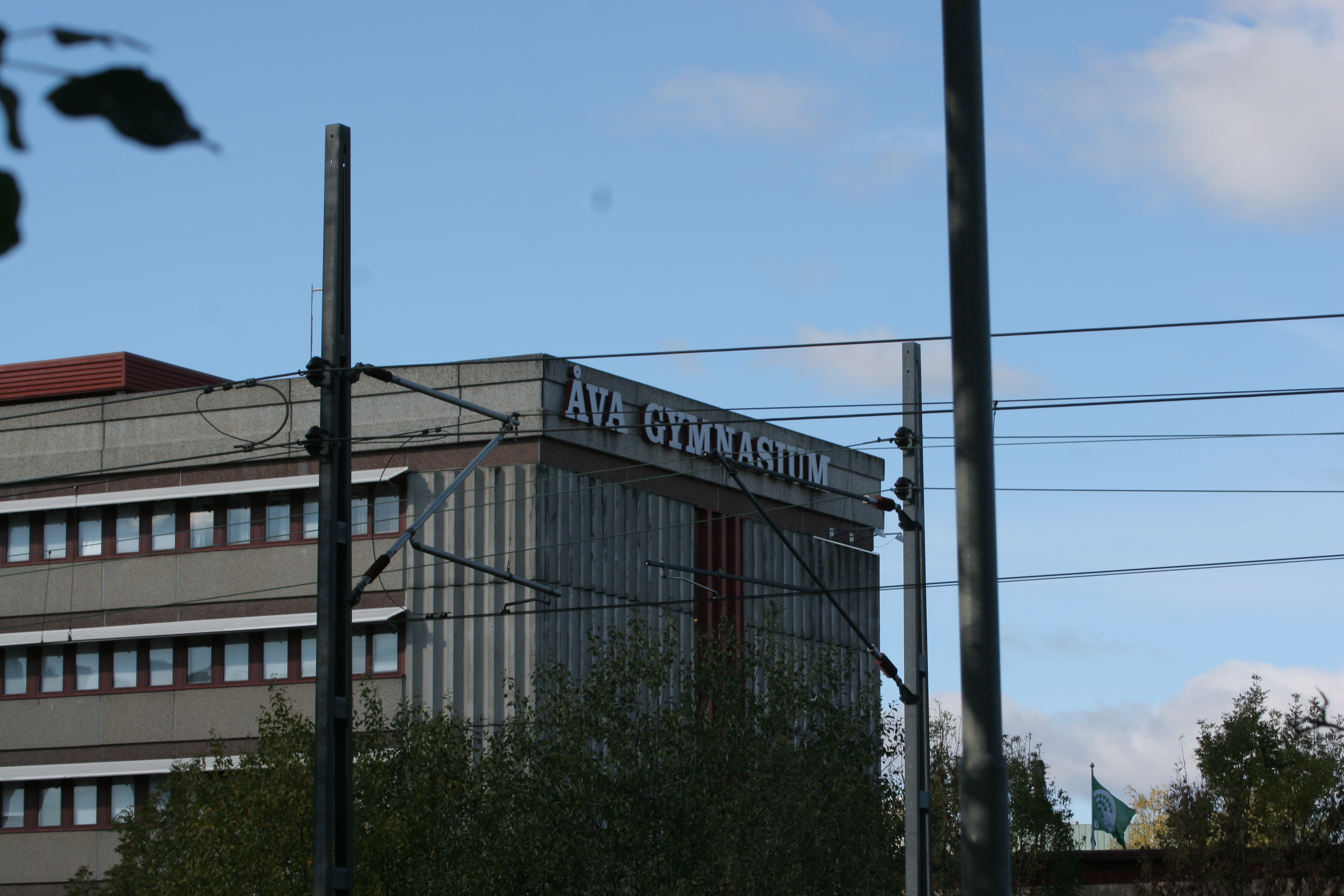
- Täby, Stockholm; Sweden

Information
- Type: State school
- Motto: Med blick för kunskap
- Established: 1970
- Enrollment: Approx 1300
- Color: Red
- Website: taby.se/ava

Åva Gymnasium is a public secondary school located in Täby, Sweden, a suburb to the north of the capital, Stockholm. Established in 1970, it teaches most of the Swedish national curriculum programmes, as well as a two-year International Baccalaureate Diploma programme, with a mandatory pre-IB year at Åva before beginning the programme in order to make up for the 1-year gap between Sweden and other parts of the world. The student population is around 1,300.

The school is strong in the sciences, and has won numerous national science competition awards as well as awards for its restaurant programme, located in a nearby hotel. Recently the IB department has been among the most successful in the country gradewise and is a big contributor of students to the top national universities. The school receives a yearly scholarship from the Hans Buhre memory fund in order to assist young science-minded students in continuing their studies in higher education, as the namesake of the fund is an Åva alumni and went on to found the second largest employer in Täby municipality.

The student newspaper, Cumulus, is printed annually and won the Lilla Journalistpriset (Young Journalist Award) in 2011 and 2013.

The school has a historical rivalry with another very close Täby school, Tibble Gymnasium, and every year competes in a sporting competition between the two schools.

== Notable alumni ==
- Fredrik Reinfeldt, former Prime Minister of Sweden
- Kristian Luuk, comedian and television anchor
- Fredrik Carlsson Orienteringsskytte, (Athlete), Gold Medal in Biathlon Orienteering - Sprint
- Eric Prydz, music producer, sound engineer, DJ.
- Hans Buhre, engineer, founder of Micronic.
