= Prince Bagdasarian =

American film producer

- Born: January 26, 1984 (age 42); Los Angeles, California, U.S.
- Occupations: Film director, screenwriter & editor
- Years active: 2001–present
- Notable work: Abstraction

Prince Bagdasarian (born January 26, 1984) is an American film director, screenwriter, and editor. His directorial debut feature film "Abstraction", garnered various awards at festivals and was released in the United States by Breaking Glass Pictures in 2015.

== Education and career ==
Bagdasarian was born and raised in Los Angeles, California. At the age of 10, he began performing magic and stage illusions with his younger sister Rose Bagdasarian. Together, they appeared on a variety of television shows in the 90's, and were featured in magazines and newspapers, such as the magic industry's Genii.

As Bagdasarian's interest in the entertainment industry grew, his fondness of filmmaking grew. While attending film school, he began investing his annual earnings from a part-time job into camera gear and his short films.

In the early 2000s, he formed his production company, "PIB Productions", directing music videos for independent artists in Los Angeles and later assistant directing and editing some episodes of the television series, "The Jazzspel with Eric J" on The Word Network.

From 2004 to 2009, Bagdasarian worked on over a hundred feature films, in a variety of film production and post-production departments, from visual effects to digital intermediate and editorials. Bagdasarian was credited on such films as Sylvester Stallone's "Rambo" and Werner Herzog's "Bad Lieutenant."

In 2010, Bagdasarian co-directed the behind the scenes documentary for the feature film, "Closure", which rapidly gained the interest and shoutouts from industry professionals such as "David Goyer."

Bagdasarian's feature film directorial debut was in 2012 with the crime drama, "Abstraction", starring Academy Award nominee Eric Roberts and Ken Davitian The film was produced on a low-budget and after a limited theatrical engagement, it garnered over a dozen wins and nominations at various festivals in the US and Canada, including such awards as "Best Editing", "Best Cinematography", and "Best Production Design" at the Hollywood Reel Independent Film Festival

In January 2015, Bagdasarian's feature film "Abstraction", was feature on IndieWire after being purchased and released in the U.S. by Breaking Glass Pictures.

Bagdasarian co-produced and acted as "2nd unit director of photography" for the epic sci-fi feature film, "5th Passenger", starring acclaimed cast members from Star Trek: Voyager as Marina Sirtis, Tim Russ, Manu Intiraymi, and Armin Shimerman. The film raised a large portion of its budget on Kickstarter and was later featured on the front page of Star Trek official site.

In 2016, Bagdasarian signed on to write, direct and edit the action crime feature film, "Diverted Eden", produced by Imaginating Pictures.

== Filmography ==
=== Feature films ===
Year	Film	Role
2013	Abstraction	Writer, director, producer, editor
2016	5th Passenger	Co-Producer, Editor, 2nd Unit DP
2017	Diverted Eden	Writer, director, editor
