= Bogdan Baltazar =

Romanian banker and politician (1939 – 2012)

- Born: September 22, 1939; Bucharest, Kingdom of Romania
- Died: 28 December 2012 (aged 73); Bucharest, Romania
- Education: Politehnica University of Bucharest; City University of New York; University of Bucharest
- Occupation: Banker
- Years active: 1971–2012
- Children: 2

Bogdan Baltazar (22 September 1939 – 28 December 2012) was a leading Romanian banker and the first spokesman of the Romanian government following the fall of the communist regime. He was also a significant financial and banking advisor.

== Early life and education ==
Born in Bucharest on 22 September 1939, Baltazar studied mechanical engineering at the Politehnica University of Bucharest and graduated in 1962. He then obtained a master's degree in economics at the CUNY Graduate Center, City University of New York, in 1971. He received a Ph.D. in International relations from the University of Bucharest in 1964.

== Career ==
Baltazar worked in the ministry of foreign affairs as first diplomatic secretary and then as manager of the Africa division in the same ministry from 1971 to 1981. Then he left the ministry, but returned in 1990 and began to serve as general manager of the Northern and Southern America divisions. Next, he was named as spokesman for the Romanian Prime Minister Petre Roman following the fall of communism in December 1989. His term lasted until 1991. During this period, Baltazar was described by journalists as full of humor and charm.

From 1991 to 1996, he worked as a senior banking adviser and coordinator for the banking group for Romania in London. In 1997, he was appointed vice president of the State Property Fund (FPS) and his term lasted until 1998. He was appointed director of the French-owned Romanian Bank for Development (BRD) in 1998 and served there until 2004. Later he led a consultancy firm, and worked as an economy analyst, focusing on Central European countries. On 18 April 2011, he was re-appointed director of BRD.

== Personal life and death ==
Baltazar was married and had two children. He died of cancer at Elias Hospital in Bucharest on 28 December 2012.
