= Kreativum =

Science center in Karlshamn, Sweden

Coordinates: 56.1947°N 14.8522°E

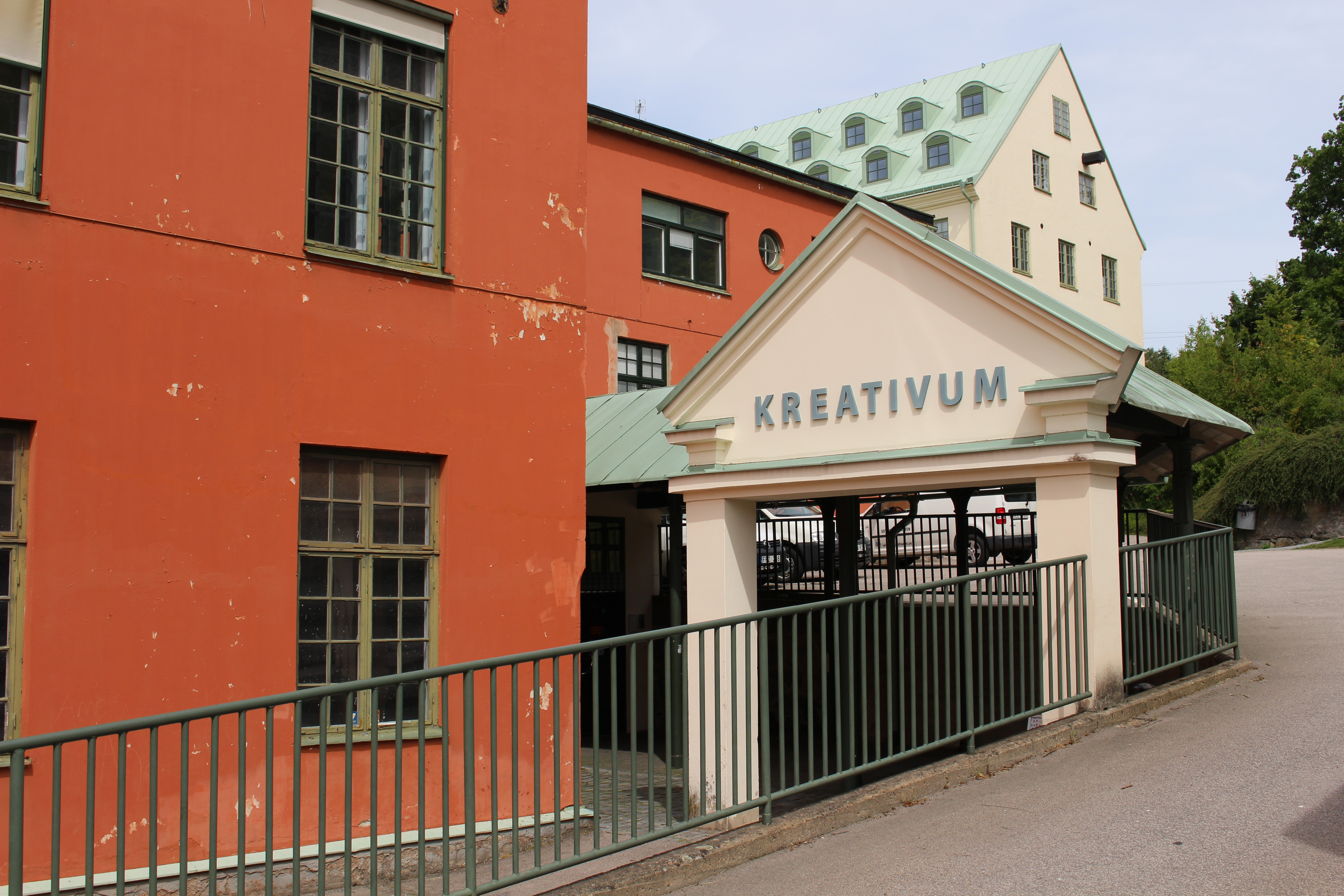
Image of the Kreativum science center

Kreativum is a science center located in the city of Karlshamn, Sweden. The center was founded by Peter Enckell and opened by Carl XVI Gustaf on 28 May 1995. Karlshamn Municipality acquired the center in December 2017. The governing coalition in Karlshamn Municipality announced an intent to sell the center for cost reasons in September 2023.
