= House of Bagdasarovs =

- Дом Багдасаровых (Russian)
- Interactive map of the House of Bagdasarovs area

General information
- Location: Taganrog, 7 Turgenevsky Lane
- Coordinates: 47°12′43″N 38°56′10″E
- Completed: 1898

The House of Bagdasarovs (Russian: Дом Багдасаровых) is a building on the historical register in Taganrog, built at the end of the 19th century for the brothers Bagdasarov. The building is located at Turgenevsky Lane, 7.

== History ==
On this land in the 19th century, a small architectural construction was built, estimated at 1000 rubles. It belonged to the tradeswoman Sofya Lutskaya. Then, for some reason, the structure was destroyed and in 1898, the brothers Melkon and Grigory Bagdasarovy built their mansion on the same location. Construction of the mansion cost them 3000 rubles. Over time the value of the house increased, so by the time of the October Revolution in 1917, the house's estimated value was 24 thousand rubles.

The house had several floors, and the top floor was leased. At the beginning of the 20th century, the merchant Ivan Vasilyevich Kateri became the owner of the house. Kateri owned a sausage plant, which was down Chekhovian Street, besides owning a boilery down the street at Myasnitskoy, 19. The merchant began to produce and distribute British scones. Being the owner of houses on Aleksandrovskoy Street 1 and 3, he bought the house on Turgenevsky Lane. The cost of the houses on Aleksandrovskoy Street were 500 and 150 rubles, respectively. Ivan Kaveri was married to Anastasia Vasilyevna and they had three children named Vasily, Ivan, and Paraskeva. The house was partially leased by other tenants, which provided further income to Kateri. Among the tenants was a barrister named Mikhail Markovic Milstein.

Valentina Abramovna Govberg lived in the house. She was a mezzo-soprano singer of Gipsy romances and Russian national songs. In 1940, she moved to the house on Turgenevsky Lane along with her sister, Elena Abramovna. Elena Abramovna was the wife of the famous Taganrog lawyer, Yakov Borisovich Sveta. Before the Russian Revolution of 1917, Svet was the assistant to a barrister of Judaic law.

In the 1920s, Fedor Vasilyevich and his wife, Raisa Konstantinovna moved in to the right domestic wing of the house. They had two daughters named Olga and Vera. Fedor Vasilyevich was an accountant at the city prosecutor's office and suffered from scrupulosity and negotiorum gestio. Over time, their daughter Vera became a watchmaker, and Olga became interested in the spheres of art and history. The family was known for their care of homeless animals.

In the 1930s in one of the apartments of the house there lived the violinist Mikhail Steshenko. Visitors before the sessions at Luch movie theater could hear its game. Also in the apartment there lived the violinist Beyntsman who played in the orchestra of Mall.
