= Arev Baghdasaryan =

Soviet Armenian singer (1913–1994)

Arev Baghdasaryan Armenian: Արև Բաղդասարյան
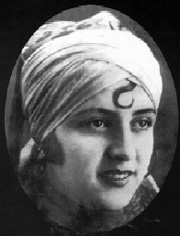

Background information
- Born: April 2 (16), 1913; Shusha, Elisabethpol Governorate, Russian Empire
- Origin: Russian Empire Soviet Union Armenia
- Died: February 17, 1994 (aged 80) Yerevan, Armenian SSR, Soviet Union
- Occupations: singer, dancer

Arev Baghdasaryan (Armenian: Արև Բաղդասարյան; April 1913 – February 17, 1994) was an Armenian dancer, singer, People's Artist of the Armenian SSR (1961).

== Biography ==
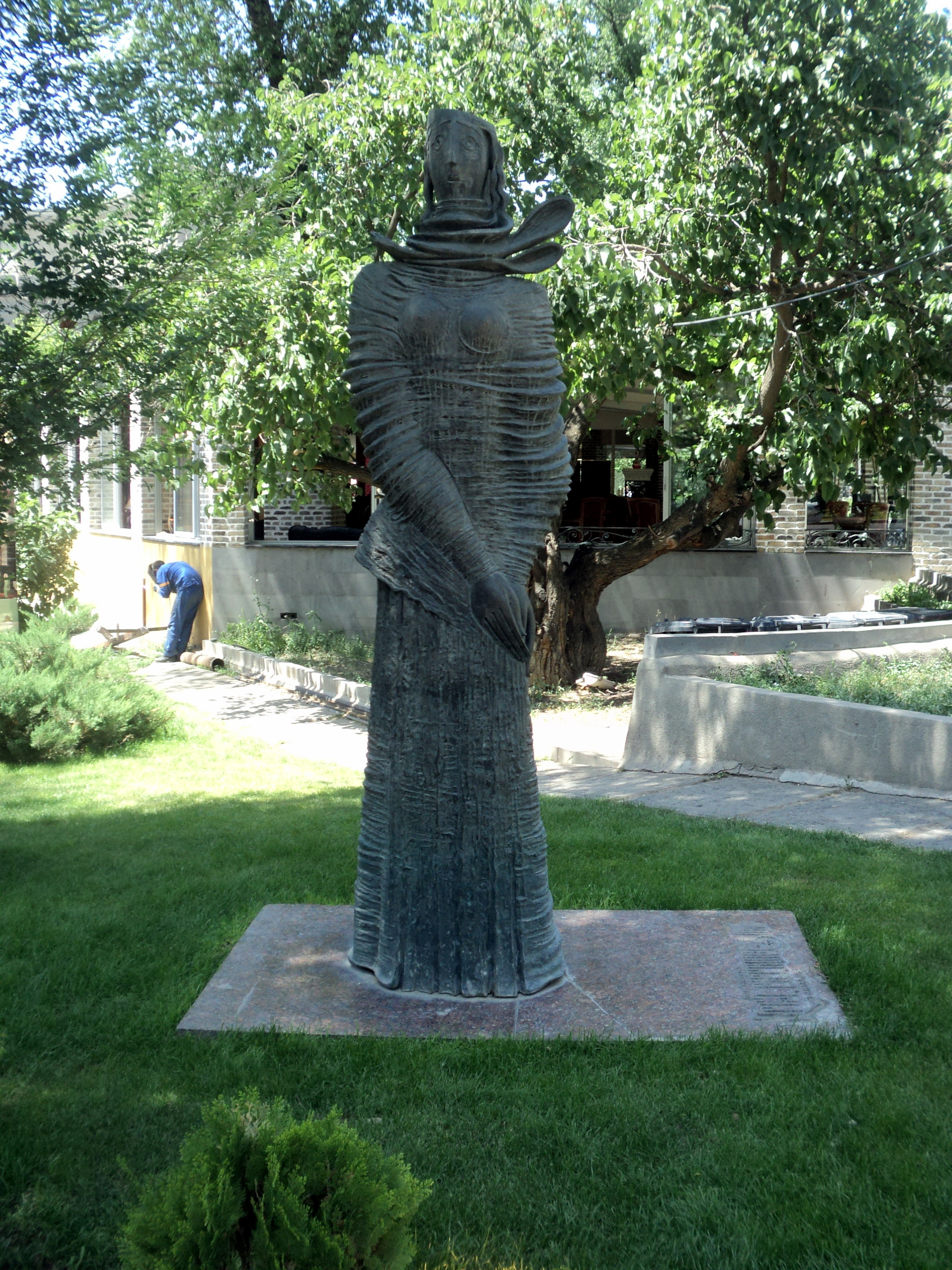
"A woman from Karabakh" monument created according to the image of Arev Baghdasaryan

Arev Baghdasaryan was born in Shushi, Russian Empire. She graduated from the Azerbaijan State Economic University. In 1936 she won the first place at the Rostov Song and Dance Olympiad. In 1940 she graduated from the Baku Dancing College and got a diploma of solo dancer. During 1937-1941 she performed in the Ensemble of song and dance of the Azerbaijan SSR.

In 1938 in Moscow Arev Baghdasaryan met Avetik Isahakyan who advised her to move to Soviet Armenia. In 1941 she became the soloist of the Armenian State Philharmonic. German-Soviet War, she was involved in the 89th Tamanian Rifle Division.

Since 1946, Arev Baghdasaryan worked in jazz orchestra conducted by founder of the Armenian State Jazz Orchestra Artemi Ayvazyan and performed in many cities of the Soviet Union and abroad, including Canada, China, Vietnam, Indonesia, Birma (Myanmar), France, Belgium, Luxemburg, India, Nepal, Pakistan, Egypt, Lebanon, etc. In 1981 and 1991 she made a tour in Washington, USA. During 1955–1987 she was the artistic director of "Barekamutyun" Song and dance ensemble.

One of the popular songs by the artist was "Nakhshun Bajin". Arev Baghdasaryan was buried in "Nakhshun Baji" costume.

== Awards ==
- Honored Artist of the Armenian SSR (1955)
- Order of the Badge of Honour (1956)
- Ho Chi Minh badge (1957)
- People's Artist of the Armenian SSR (1961)
- Jubilee Medal "In Commemoration of the 100th Anniversary of the Birth of Vladimir Ilyich Lenin" (1970)
- Medal "Veteran of Labour" (1983)

== Legacy ==
- In 1983 the name of Arev Baghdasaryan was given to "Barekamutyun" Song and Dance Ensemble.
- Arev Baghdasaryan's memorial plaque can be seen on wall of the 21st building of Abovyan Street in Yerevan (Arev Baghdasaryan lived in that building).
- "A woman from Karabakh" monument (sculptor - David Yerevantsi), which stands on the crossroads of Teryan Street and Sayat-Nova Avenue, was created by the image of Arev Baghdasaryan.
