= Balthazar Science Center =

Balthazar Science Center is a Swedish science center located in Västergötland, Skövde. It contains four Halley's Comet 3D models, as part of the Sweden Solar System. The Chairman of the Board is Ulrica Linnéa Margareta Johansson.
