= Safford =

Safford may refer to:

- Safford, Arizona, a city in Graham County, Arizona
- Safford Regional Airport, an airport serving Safford, Arizona
- Safford, Alabama, an unincorporated community in Dallas County, Alabama
- Safford House, a historic home in Tarpon Springs, Florida
- Safford Cape (1906–1973), American composer and musicologist
- Andrew Safford House, 1819, designed in the Federal style by an unknown architect
- Anson P.K. Safford (1830–1891), 3rd Governor of Arizona Territory (1869–1877)
- Laurance Safford (1890–1973), a U.S. Navy cryptologist
- Truman Henry Safford (1836–1901), an American calculating prodigy
- William Edwin Safford (1859–1926), an American botanist and ethnologist
- Benton Safford, a fictional character in novels by R. B. Dominic
- James M. Safford (1822–1907), an American geologist

== See also ==
- Katherine Safford Harris, a noted psychologist and speech scientist
- George Safford Parker (1863–1937), an American inventor and industrialist
- Safford Unified School District v. Redding, a United States Supreme Court case concerning a strip search conducted by public school officials
