= Hiram M. Van Arman =

American businessman and politician (1839–1904)

6th Secretary of Arizona Territory
- In office April 17, 1882 – November 6, 1885
- Nominated by: Chester A. Arthur
- Preceded by: John J. Gosper
- Succeeded by: James Asherton Bayard

Personal details
- Born: February 17, 1839 Euclid, Ohio, US
- Died: April 28, 1904 (aged 65) Oakland, California, US
- Party: Republican
- Spouse: Isabella Haines (m. 1868)

Military service
- Allegiance: United States; Union
- Branch/service: Union Army
- Years of service: 1861–1862
- Rank: Second lieutenant
- Unit: 58th Illinois Volunteer Infantry Regiment
- Battles/wars: Battle of Fort Donelson; Battle of Shiloh

Hiram Miller Van Arman (February 17, 1839 – April 28, 1904) was an American politician and journalist who served as Secretary of Arizona Territory from 1882 till 1885. In addition to his political career, he was a Union officer during the American Civil War and served as editor for a number of publications in Nebraska and California.

== Biography ==
Van Arman was born to Richard R. and Elizabeth (Roberts) Van Arman on February 17, 1839, in Euclid, Ohio. His family moved to Galena, Illinois, in 1846 where the younger Van Arman received his education. At the beginning of the American Civil War, Van Arman became a lieutenant in the 58th Illinois Volunteer Infantry Regiment. He participated in the Battle of Fort Donelson and was severely wounded during the Battle of Shiloh. As a result of his wounds, he was medically discharged from the military on June 20, 1862. For the remainder of the war he served as a military recruiting superintendent for Illinois's 2nd congressional district.

In 1868, Van Arman moved to Nebraska where he served as an immigration agent. He held that position until 1871 when he became editor of Lincoln's Nebraska State Journal. Van Arman married Isabella Haines in Lincoln on August 20, 1868. The couple had no children.

Three years later Van Arman moved to San Francisco, California and became an editor for the Evening Post. Shortly thereafter he made his home in Oakland. In addition to his work for the Post, Van Arman was an editor for the Chronicle Bulletin and the Golden State Sentinel, the Ancient Order of United Workmen's official publication, and the sporting paper Pacific Life. During this time he wrote a book about the public lands of California and was active in Republican politics.

President Chester A. Arthur nominated Van Arman to become Secretary of Arizona Territory on February 14, 1882. While he was under consideration for the position, one Arizona newspaper described him as "forty three years old, weighs two hundred and three pounds avoirdupois, stands five feet eight and a half inches high, wears a seven and a quarter hat, and number eight boots." A less friendly newspaper described him as "a man of mediocre ability, a good absorber of whiskey and considered a little 'off' among his acquaintances." In late March, Van Arman passed through Arizona on his way from California to Washington D.C. before returning to take his oath of office in Prescott on April 17.

Upon taking office, Van Arman discovered a severe shortage of funds with which to perform his duties. Outgoing secretary John J. Gosper informed him that only $550 remained for his office of the funds allocated for 1881–1882. This included no money for postage. Compounding this problem, Van Arman had no access to his predecessor's records. An example of the problems Van Arman faced came during the summer of 1882 when a shipment of one hundred rifles was sent by the War Department to Prescott. It was traditional for the territory to pay the shipping fees and it fell to Van Arman, in his role as acting governor during Governor Tritle's absence, to locate the needed funds. It took some time to find the money and afterwards he sent a telegram to the U.S. Treasury Department saying, "I have found a way out of the difficulty and will get the guns. The territory is quite poor in purse although rich in mineral wealth. All the citizens have a holy horror of being assessed, or paying taxes."

Initially, Van Arman's office was located in a school building away from Prescott's business district. The school wished for him to leave the building and he located new office space on June 1. The territorial secretary found there was no insurance on the territory's property despite Prescott being constructed entirely from wood and possessing minimal fire protection. To address this concern, Van Arman purchased a $2000 policy for $18. He also acquired a double-door safe for $450, allowing the territory a place to store incorporation documents and other archival records. Locating the money to pay this expense again presented a difficulty.

For the convening of the 1883 session of the territorial legislature, Van Arman made arraignments for the session to meet in Prescott's city hall. A privately owned building, the structure delighted the legislators by providing freshly wallpapered walls, carpeted hallways to deaden sounds, lamps, stoves, and an ample supply of firewood. Following the practice of the day, Van Arman attempted to have all territorial printing jobs contracted to newspapers that favored his party. Towards this end he wrote to the legislature, saying "I do not wish to aid in sustaining party papers, which lampoon not only the Republican party generally, but all Federal officials indiscriminately and personally. In this stand I hope that I shall have your support and do not compel me to aid Democratic newspapers." In the end, printing contracts for the session went to firms in San Francisco and Nebraska. Van Arman's problem with the Nebraska printing company was they did not follow his orders to bind all but twenty-five copies of the legislative journal in a paper binding costing 10¢ a copy but instead used a half-sheep binding costing 40¢ for all 250 copies. The territorial secretary later said, "How such a blunder could have been made is beyond my comprehension."

The convening of the 13th Arizona Territorial Legislature presented Van Arman with another financial problem when members of the session demanded $4000 more in travel expenses than the secretary felt they were entitled. The secretary finally settled with most of the session's members based upon estimated travel distances, but had difficulty with the council president, F. K. Ainsworth, who lived in the capital but claimed he could demand travel expenses from any county in the territory.

With the approach of the 1884 elections, Van Arman was recommended to become the Republican nominee for territorial delegate to Congress by the Arizona Sentinel. The Democrats won the White House during the 1884 election, signalling the territorial secretary's term would soon end. Van Arman submitted his formal resignation on November 6, 1885 When the incoming secretary, James A. Bayard, arrived in Prescott, Van Arman met him at the rail station.

Shortly after completing the transfer of office, Van Arman returned to California. In 1886, Van Arman was working as a traveling passenger agent for the Southern Pacific Railroad. He initially covered an area west of Detroit and Toledo, east of the Mississippi River, and north of St. Louis, but was soon reassigned to Chicago. Following the election of President William McKinley, Van Arman was a leading candidate to become Governor of Arizona Territory.

Van Arman died in Oakland, California, on April 28, 1904. His body was cremated. While his family owned a plot in Oakland's Mountain View Cemetery, his cremains were never placed there.
