= 9th Arizona Territorial Legislature =

Session of the Arizona Territorial Legislature (1877)

←	8th	10th	→

Overview
- Legislative body: Arizona Territorial Legislature
- Jurisdiction: Arizona Territory, United States

Council
- Members: 9
- President: King S. Woolsey

House of Representatives
- Members: 18
- Speaker: M. H. Calderwood

The 9th Arizona Territorial Legislative Assembly was a session of the Arizona Territorial Legislature which convened on January 1, 1877, in Tucson, Arizona Territory. It passed 79 statutes and adopted the Hoyt Code as the basis of the Territory's legal system.

== Background ==
The Indian wars were winding down, with most of Arizona Territory's native population pacified. Following 1877 there would be periodic outbreaks of violence but no widespread conflict. The reduction in violence was allowing the economy to boom. Prospectors had found and were developing a number of mineral deposits. Reduced Indian problems had allowed importation of sheep and cattle. Additionally, the Southern Pacific Railroad was being built across the territory.

Governor Anson P.K. Safford's education initiatives were prospering. A May 1876 census showed at least 1,450 of the territory's 2,955 children were literate. Territorial school districts were also preparing to issue bonds to replace makeshift classrooms with larger structures better able to handle the growing demand.

The territorial legal code was in need of updating. To address this need, Territorial Secretary John Philo Hoyt had been commissioned to create a revised code based upon the "Howell Code" which was adopted by the 1st Arizona Territorial Legislature.

== Legislative session ==
The legislative session began on January 1, 1877.

=== Governor's address ===
As with all his previous addresses, Governor Safford discussed the current situation involving the Indian Wars. To this he added his concerns about outlaws. Declaring highwaymen "are a scourge to civilization, a disgrace to humanity, and should be swept from the face of the earth as remorselessly as the most ferocious wild beast", he recommended highway robbery be made a capital crime. The governor was able to report that the Yuma Territorial Prison was partially open, holding eight prisoners with a capacity for thirty.

=== Legislation ===
The ninth session of the Arizona Territorial Legislature was unusually productive, passing 79 new laws. The revised legal code drafted by the Territorial Secretary, dubbed the "Hoyt Code", was adopted as the basis of the territory's legal system.

Despite the previous session's permanently fixing the territorial capital in Tucson, the first action taken by this session was to move the capital to Prescott. Other organizational changes included adjusting the northern boundary of Maricopa County, moving the seat of Mohave County to Mineral Park, and incorporating the City of Tucson. In a related activity, residents of Grant County, New Mexico Territory had voiced a desire to have their county annexed to the Arizona Territory. The legislature responded by petitioning the U.S. Congress to make the requested transfer.

To help deal with continuing lawlessness, the session authorized payment of a US$300 reward for the capture of two highwaymen who had robbed a stagecoach and its accompanying United States mail near Skull Valley on January 4, 1877. They also authorized formation of another volunteer force to fight in the Apache Wars.

Other actions included imposition of a US$50 fine on anyone who allowed their hogs to run wild within a town. Maricopa County was given permission to issue US$15,000 in bonds for a series of four roads radiating from Phoenix: one to Globe City, one to Yuma via Agua Caliente, and two routes to Prescott via Black Canyon and Wickenburg. Finally, the session granted divorces to ten couples.

== Members ==
House of Representatives
Name	District	Name	District
J. A. Parker	Maricopa	John H. Marion	Yavapai
D. A. Bennett	Pima	S. C. Miller	Yavapai
James P. Bull	Mohave	Estevan Ochoa	Pima
M. H. Calderwood (Speaker)	Maricopa	William Ohnesorgen	Pima
John W. Dorrington	Yuma	Ed G. Peck	Yavapai
C. B. Foster	Yavapai	Hugo Richards	Yavapai
G. Hathaway	Yavapai	Mariano G. Samaniego	Pima
William S. Head	Yavapai	George Scott	Pinal
W. W. Hutchinson	Yavapai	George H. Stevens	Pima

Council
Name	District
F. H. Goodwin	Pima
Fred G. Hughes	Pima
George D. Kendall	Yavapai
Andrew L. Moeller	Yavapai
José M. Redondo	Yuma
Levi Ruggles	Pinal
John A. Rush	Yavapai
Lewis A. Stevens	Yavapai
King S. Woolsey (President)	Maricopa
