= Albert Franklin Banta =

American newspaperman, politician, jurist, army scout (1843–1924)

Albert Franklin Banta (December 18, 1843 – June 21, 1924) was an American newspaperman, politician, jurist, and army scout. As a scout, he was a member of the Wheeler Survey and assisted General George Crook during the Apache Wars. Banta was influential in the creation of Apache County, Arizona and later represented the county in the Arizona Territorial Legislature. As a newspaperman, he started and operated a number of papers throughout Arizona Territory.

For roughly two decades he used the assumed name Charles A. Franklin instead of his birth name.

== Biography ==
Banta was born to John and Phydelia (or Fidelia) Banta on December 19, 1845, in Warrick County, Indiana. His family moved to Wisconsin in 1848. His formal education ended at age 11. There is no record he ever married.

At the beginning of the American Civil War, Banta served as a "Three Month Volunteer" in the Missouri State Militia. Following his enlistment, he went to work for the Kansas Tribune. On a trip to Kansas City, Missouri, he was arrested by Union soldiers and accused of being a Confederate spy in the service of William Quantrill. Though released, he apparently took umbrage at the treatment he had received. He left his job and worked as a bullwacker from Fort Leavenworth to Santa Fe. About this time he began using the name Charles A. Franklin.

Franklin arrived in Albuquerque on June 20, 1863. He worked briefly for the Rio Abajo Press, then joined the 1st California Volunteers. In this role he served as a teamster escorting Governor John Noble Goodwin's party to the newly formed Arizona Territory. Shortly after his arrival in the Chino Valley, he assisted Editor Tisdale A. Hand in producing two editions of the Arizona Miner, on a press brought to the territory by Richard C. McCormick. He also worked as a cowboy for R. E. Farrington and traveled extensively through the territory, keeping a record of his wanderings in a personal journal. His knowledge of the region prompted the military to employ him as a scout.

Though a Democrat, Franklin served as an aid to Governor McCormick with the rank of colonel. In the late 1860, lacking funds for a new set of boots, he acquired the nickname "Buckskin Charley" after making himself a set of moccasins and a buckskin suit.

In 1869, Franklin was a constable in Wickenburg. He moved to Tucson in January 1871, working there for the Arizona Citizen. He continued to serve as a scout and guide, assisting General George Crook during the Apache Wars. In 1871 he was a member of the Wheeler Survey, and served as its chief guide in 1873. In 1873 he was credited with the discovery of Meteor Crater‍—‌for a time called "Franklin's Hole".

After leaving Tucson, Franklin was a sub-Indian Agent at Fort Grant. His work as a guide led him to Yuma, and from there he took a steamer to California. There he worked for a short time at the San Diego Union before returning to Arizona Territory.

During his travels, Franklin read law and earned admission to the Arizona bar. He became justice of the peace in St. Johns, Arizona, in 1876. The next year he moved to Springerville, where he again was justice of the peace. He then lived briefly in Florence before returning to Tucson. He began a three-week prospecting trip in the Santa Catarina (now called Santa Catalina) mountains with Johnny B. Hart on October 31, 1877. The two men located what the Arizona Citizen called "some very rich strikes of gold and silver.". Franklin was a deputy sheriff under Pima County Sheriff Charles A. Shibell in late 1877.

Franklin returned to Springerville in 1879, becoming the town's first postmaster. He was instrumental in convincing the territorial legislature to create Apache County, and served as county attorney for the new county from 1879 to 1881, and county probate judge from 1881 to 1883. He was County assessor for Apache county in 1880, represented Apache County during the 12th Arizona Territorial Legislature. Following his service in the legislature, Franklin legally changed his name back to Alfred Franklin Banta.

Banta served a second term as Apache County attorney from 1889–91. He also returned to the newspaper business, founding several new papers. He founded the Orion Era in St. Johns and later sold the paper to a group of Mormons. In 1895, he founded the Holbrook Argus. In 1896, founded the Arizona Populist. The Populist was renamed the Pick and Drill following a suggestion by Buckey O'Neill. O'neill also convinced Banta to move to Prescott in 1896. Banta had an opportunity to purchase the Arizona Gazette, but felt the $6,000 offering price to be excessive. In 1902, Banta founded the Douglas Dispatch.

A 1900 fire that damaged Prescott's Whiskey Row destroyed the Pick and Drill and dealt Banta a serious financial setback. After the fire, Banta traveled extensively while working a variety of odd jobs. Places visited included New Orleans, California, Florida, New York City, and Panama. In 1914, he settled in Wickenburg. Two years later he moved into the Arizona Pioneers' Home. During his retirement, Banta spent time at the offices of the Prescott Courier chronicling his life. A copy of the document he produced was kept at the Sharlot Hall Museum until its publication in 1952 under the title Albert Franklin Banta: Arizona Pioneer. Banta died in Prescott on June 21, 1924, after several months of declining health. He was buried at the Pioneers' Home Cemetery.

The Grand Canyon's "Banta Point" is named in Banta's honor. Tucson's "Franklin Street" was named after his work on a surveying crew led by Solomon W. Foreman in March 1872.
