= Mary J. Safford =

American physician

Mary Jane Safford-Blake
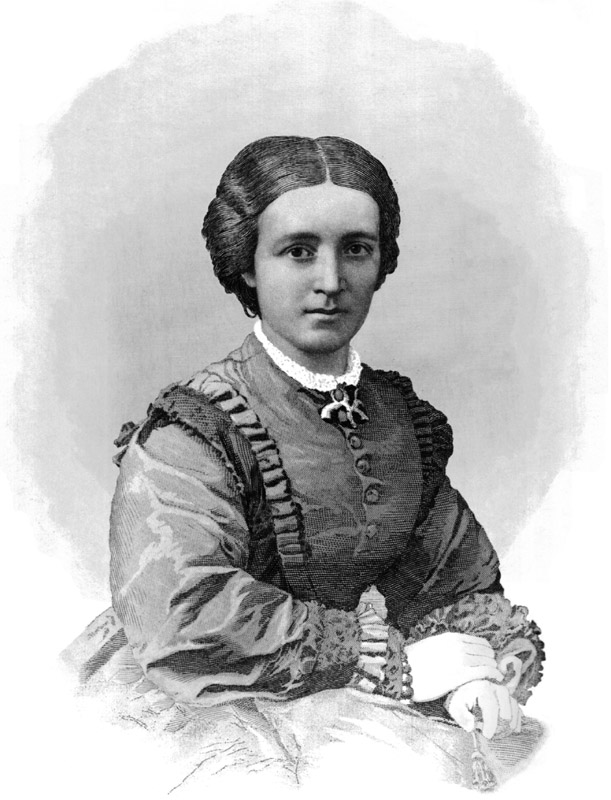
- 1867 engraving of Mary J. Safford by John Sartain
- Born: Mary Jane Safford; December 31, 1834; Hyde Park, Vermont, U.S.
- Died: December 8, 1891 (aged 56); Tarpon Springs, Florida, U.S.
- Known for: Nurse; Physician; Educator; Humanitarian

Mary Jane Safford-Blake (December 31, 1834 – December 8, 1891) was a nurse, physician, educator, and humanitarian. As a nurse in the Union Army during the American Civil War, she worked closely with Mary Ann Bickerdyke treating the sick and injured near Fort Donelson, and was nicknamed the "Cairo Angel" for her service in Cairo, Illinois. After the war, she became one of the first female gynecologists in the United States and was the first woman to perform an ovariotomy. She later taught at Boston University, and was one of the first women elected to the Boston School Committee.

== Early life ==
Mary Jane Safford was born in Hyde Park, Vermont, the youngest of five children of Joseph Safford, a farmer, and Diantha Little Safford. She attended schools in Vermont, Illinois, and Montreal, Quebec. She then returned to Illinois, where she lived with her older brother and taught in a public school in Shawneetown.

== Medical career ==
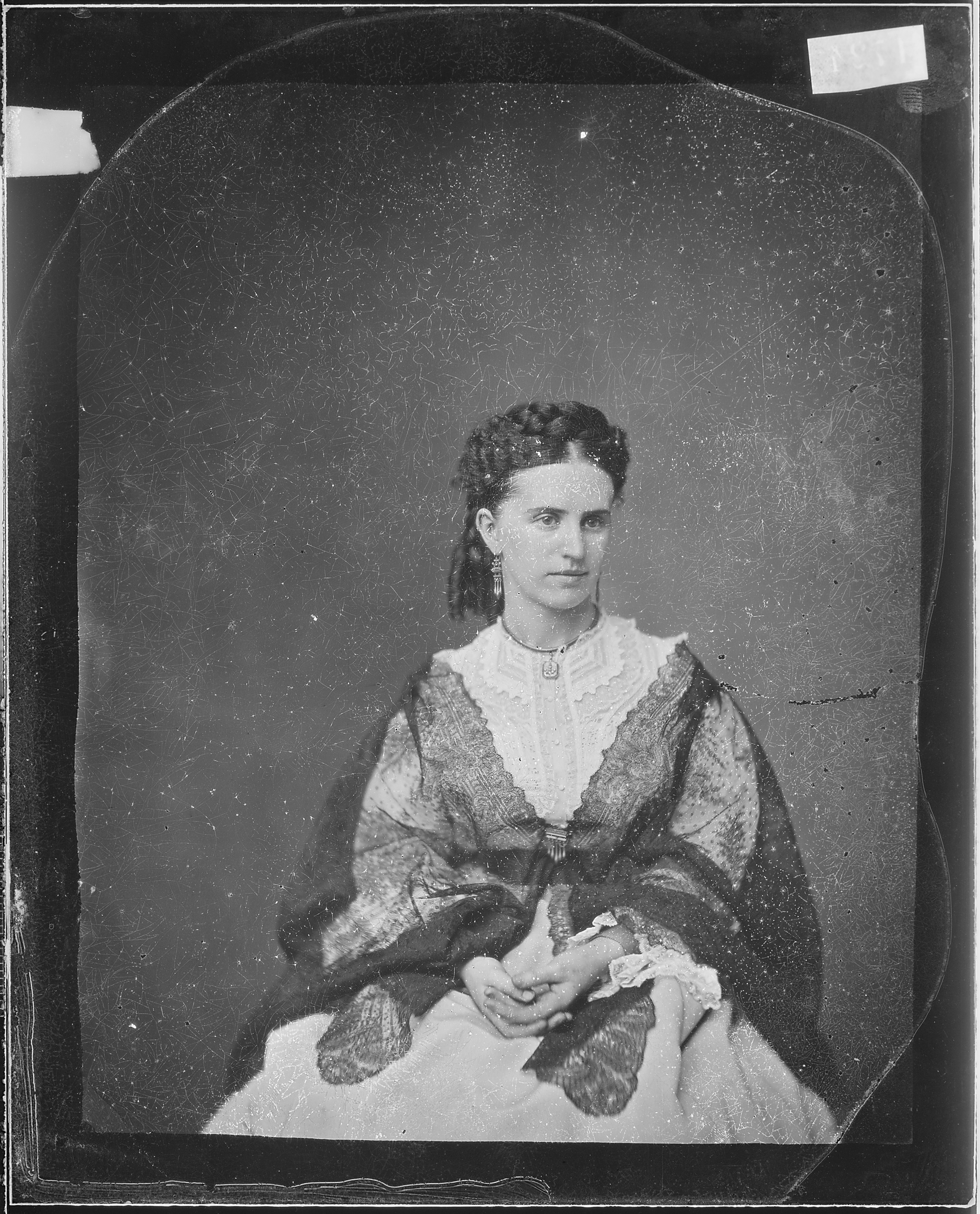
Mary Jane Safford by Mathew Brady (between circa 1860 and circa 1865)

At the start of the Civil War in 1861, Safford volunteered as a relief worker in Cairo, Illinois, where she became known as the "Cairo Angel". It was there that she met "Mother" Bickerdyke, who trained her as a nurse. In 1862, she accompanied the army of Ulysses S. Grant during the Battle of Shiloh, where she comforted and ministered to the wounded. Later, she served aboard a pair of military hospital ships on the Mississippi, the City of Memphis and the Hazel Dell. "Worn down" and frail, she left for Europe in July 1862. After visits to Great Britain and Ireland her party spent the winter in Paris and Italy.

After the war, Safford studied medicine, graduating from the New York Medical College and Hospital for Women in 1869. She also studied at Vienna General Hospital, the University of Breslau, and the University of Heidelberg. At Breslau, she was the first woman to perform an ovariotomy. While studying at Heidelberg, she befriended Isabel Chapin Barrows, the first American woman ophthalmologist.

In 1872, Safford opened a private practice in Chicago, becoming one of the first female gynecologists in the United States. She developed a plan for mass housing centered on a common service area for cooperative housekeeping to reduce drudgery for women. Later, she became Professor of Women's Diseases at the Boston University School of Medicine, where she was one of only two professors of gynecology. In 1875 she was one of the first women to be elected to the Boston School Committee.

As a physician in Boston's South End, Safford specialized in the care of impoverished inner-city women and girls—mostly immigrants from the North, South, and West Ends and the South Bay area. Her Boston home was located at 5 Percival Street on Meeting House Hill in Dorchester.

== Personal life ==
Safford married James Blake in 1872 and adopted two daughters, Margarita and Gladys. After her marriage, she used the name Mary Jane Safford-Blake. The couple divorced in 1880.

Safford was involved in the women's suffrage movement and counted the activists Mary Livermore and Alice Stone Blackwell among her friends. She was a proponent of dress reform, a member of the Women's Educational and Industrial Union, and a believer in free love. Through Isabel Barrows, she befriended the Russian socialist Catherine Breshkovsky, who was known as the "little grandmother of the Russian Revolution".

She retired in 1886 due to poor health and spent her later years in Tarpon Springs, Florida, with her brother Anson and his family. She died on December 8, 1891, aged 56. Safford is remembered on the Boston Women's Heritage Trail.

== Publications ==
- Dress-Reform: a series of lectures on dress as it affects the health of women, 1874.
- Papers, read at the second congress of women, Chicago, October 15, 16, and 17, 1874 : a plea for fallen women, 1874.
- Lac Defloratum, 1874.
- The Etiology and Infectiousness of Puerperal Fever, 1875.
- Pre-natal influence, 1878.
- Health and strength for girls, 1884.

== See also ==
- Safford House
