= John J. Gosper =

American politician and businessman (1842–1913)

John Jay Gosper

5th Secretary of Arizona Territory
- In office May 30, 1877 – April 17, 1882
- Nominated by: Rutherford B. Hayes
- Preceded by: John Philo Hoyt
- Succeeded by: Hiram M. Van Arman

Secretary of State of Nebraska
- In office January 13, 1873 – January 11, 1875

Personal details
- Born: April 8, 1842 (Note: While 1842 is most likely Gosper's year of birth, some evidence exists that he may have been born in either 1840 or 1841.) Mount Vernon, Ohio
- Died: May 14, 1913 (aged 71) Los Angeles, California
- Party: Republican
- Spouse(s): Waitie E. Polley Graham (m. 1866; div. 1879) Sarah L. Watson (m. 1881)

John Jay Gosper (April 8, 1842 – May 14, 1913) was an American politician and businessman who served as Secretary of State of Nebraska and Secretary of Arizona Territory. Much of his service in Arizona was spent as Acting Governor due to Governor John C. Frémont's virtual abandonment of his post.

== Biography ==
Gosper was born in the vicinity of Mount Vernon, Knox County, Ohio to Adelia Freer and Nathan P. Gosper on April 8, 1842. The family moved to a farm close to Geneva, Illinois in 1845 and Gosper's father died in 1850. From the age of eleven to eighteen he was apprenticed to a local farmer, leaving his employer early due to poor treatment.

With the coming of the American Civil War, Gosper enlisted in the 8th Illinois Cavalry and served in around 30 engagements during the next two years. Following his enlistment, Gosper was commissioned as quartermaster of the 29th Regiment, United States Colored Infantry. In his new role, Gosper served during the Siege of Petersburg. He was wounded on December 4, 1864 and lost his left leg. Gosper was hospitalized until March 1865 and was discharged from the military two months later. When he was 25, Gosper married Waitie E. Polley Graham, a widow with a 12-year-old son. During the war she had served as a nurse for the Union Army.

After his discharge, Gosper returned to Illinois briefly before enrolling at Eastman Business College. Upon completing his education, he returned to Geneva where he farmed and raised hogs. In 1870, Gosper moved to Lincoln, Nebraska. There he became a member of the city council, rising to president of the council in 1872. From January 13, 1873 to January 11, 1875, Gosper was the Secretary of State of Nebraska.

Gosper visited Arizona Territory in 1876. When the territorial secretary position became available the next year, he applied for the position. President Rutherford B. Hayes appointed Gosper to become Secretary of Arizona Territory on April 13, 1877. He took his oath of office in Yuma, Arizona Territory on May 24. He then proceeded on to Tucson, arriving there on May 30 only to learn the capital had been moved to Prescott.

He was granted a divorce by the 10th Arizona Territorial Legislature which February 7, 1879.

Sent a letter to President Garfield on March 17, 1881 asking to be appointed Governor of Arizona Territory. This request likened the appointment to a "civil service" promotion and dropped the names of former president Grant and others who would recognize his name from his service during the civil war.

In report to the Secretary of Interior submitted on October 6, 1881, Gosper requested Governor Frémont be required to either return to the territory or resign.

"recommending either to you or to Congress that the regularly appointed governor of this territory be required to return to his post of duty, or be asked to step aside and permit some other gentleman to take his place and feel at liberty to act without restraint."

He recommended the problem of dealing with hostile Indians be transferred entirely to the War Department. He felt that some Indian agents aggravated the problems with the Indians through dishonesty and that Army officers would be more likely to act as honest brokers than individuals with short-term contracts.

His second marriage was to Sarah Louise Watson in 1881.

He requested Arizona Territory be granted a fourth judicial district, arguing that the then current three districts were too large and that the growing population justified an additional district.

When Chester A. Arthur became President, Gosper wrote him requesting appointment as Governor, mentioning the loss of his leg during the war and the fact that he had served as Acting Governor for roughly 75% of the five years he had held the position of Territorial Secretary.

He did not receive the desired appointment following Frémont's resignation but instead saw his position given to H.M. Van Arman.

Gosper served as territorial secretary under Governors Hoyt and Frémont. Gosper County, Nebraska is named in his honor.

Gosper died on May 14, 1913. After learning the former territorial secretary had died in poverty, the Arizona State Legislature passed a $200 appropriation to help defer Gosper's funeral expenses.

== Notes ==
Political offices
Preceded by William H. James	Secretary of State of Nebraska; 1873–1875	Succeeded by
Preceded by John Philo Hoyt	Secretary of Arizona Territory; 1875–1882	Succeeded by H. M. Van Arman
