= Brazelton =

Brazelton is a surname. Notable people with the surname include:

- Conni Marie Brazelton (born 1955), American film and television actress appearing on ER (TV series)
- Dewon Brazelton (born 1980), major league pitcher currently a free agent
- Kitty Brazelton (born 1951), American vocalist, composer, flutist, and lead singer of the band Dadadah
- Ralph Brazelton Peck (1912–2008), civil engineer specializing in soil mechanics
- T. Berry Brazelton (1918–2018), pediatrician and author in the United States
- Tyrone Brazelton (born 1986), American professional basketball player
- William Brazelton, outlaw and stage robber of the Wild West

== See also ==
- 11369 Brazelton (1998 QE33), a Main-belt Asteroid discovered in 1998
