= William Buffum =

William Buffum may refer to:

- William B. Buffum (1921–2012), official in the United States Department of State
- William Mansfield Buffum (1832–1905), California and Arizona merchant, investor, and politician
