= 10th Arizona Territorial Legislature =

Session of the Arizona Territorial Legislature (1879)

←	9th	11th	→

Overview
- Legislative body: Arizona Territorial Legislature
- Jurisdiction: Arizona Territory, United States
- Term: January 6, 1879 –

Council
- Members: 9
- President: Fred G. Hughes

House of Representatives
- Members: 18
- Speaker: Madison W. Stewart

The 10th Arizona Territorial Legislative Assembly was a session of the Arizona Territorial Legislature which convened on January 6, 1879, in Prescott, Arizona Territory. The session was the last to be composed of nine Council members and eighteen members of the House of Representatives.

== Background ==
There had been several significant changes to the territorial government since the prior session. First, the territorial capital was moved from Tucson to Prescott. Second, Governor Anson P.K. Safford had declined a third term to seek his fortune in a number of mining projects. Territorial Secretary John Philo Hoyt had been named to replace Safford on April 5, 1877. Then, in 1878, John C. Frémont used his political connections to displace Hoyt and secured the governorship for himself. While Hoyt was well respected, most Arizonans were thrilled to have such a well known personality as their Governor.

The Southern Pacific Railroad had reached Yuma on September 30, 1877, providing the first rail service to the territory. They were at the time of the session building eastward across Arizona.

== Legislative session ==
The legislative session began on January 6, 1879.

=== Governor's address ===
Governor Frémont gave his address to the session on January 9, 1879. In it he spoke to the potential for development within the territory. To this end he recommended spending US$500,000 on construction of new roads. He also proposed using the Colorado River to irrigate the territory's deserts.

To assist the territory's mining industry, the governor asked for creation of a territorial assay office and proposed a refinery be built in Prescott to reduce the expense of transporting raw bullion to San Francisco.

=== Legislation ===
Governor Frémont's proposals were largely ignored by the session. They instead dealt primarily with issues affecting only individuals or limited sections of the territory. To this end an "Omnibus Divorce Bill" was passed which ending the marriages of fifteen couples. Separate bills granted divorces to two other couples. Other legislation granted name changes to eight people.

Gambling was another popular topic. An Arizona Lottery, patterned after the Louisiana Lottery, was created. Proceeds of this lottery were supposed to offset the expense of constructing schools and other public buildings. A US$300 per quarter fee for gambling licenses, half payable to the county the other to the territory, was also imposed. Less serious was a bill presented by Representative J. D. Rumberg of Maricopa County, who had apparently lost a large wager on a slow pony, that would prohibit horse racing within the territory. Other members of the House of Representatives, realizing the proposal was likely made in jest, solemnly reported their counties were not prepared for the change and had the restriction limited to Rumberg's home county. Representative John T. Alsap, also from Maricopa County, then obtained further revisions that limited the prohibition to just Rumberg's ranch. While the bill was passed by the session the resulting law was never published.

From the eastern section of Yavapai County was created Apache County. Finally, the session authorized US$2000 for Governor Frémont and Judge Charles Silent to travel to Washington, D.C., and lobby to have an order by Secretary of the Interior Carl Schurz extending boundaries of the Gila River Indian Reservation into the Salt River Valley.

== Members ==
House of Representatives
Name	District	Name	District
John T. Alsap	Maricopa	William K. Meade	Pinal
John H. Behan	Mohave	E. R. Nicoles	Yavapai
William M. Buffum	Yavapai	J. A. Park	Yavapai
John Davis	Yavapai	Samuel Purdy Jr.	Yuma
Thomas Fitch	Yavapai	J. D. Rumburg	Maricopa
Pat Hamilton	Yavapai	James Speedy	Pima
A. E. Fay	Pima	James Stinson	Yavapai
C. P. Leitch	Pima	Madison W. Stewart (Speaker)	Pima
P. McAteer	Yavapai	Walter L. Vail	Pima

Council
Name	District
Curtis Coe Bean	Yavapai
E. H. Gray	Maricopa
William S. Head	Yavapai
Fred G. Hughes (President)	Pima
J. M. Kirkpatrick	Pima
Winthrop A. Rowe	Yavapai
P. Thomas	Pinal
F. D. Welcome	Yuma
Edmund W. Wells	Yavapai
