= 21st Arizona Territorial Legislature =

Session of the Arizona Territorial Legislature (1901)

←	20th	22nd	→

Overview
- Legislative body: Arizona Territorial Legislature
- Jurisdiction: Arizona Territory, United States

Council
- Members: 12
- President: Eugene S. Ives

House of Representatives
- Members: 24
- Speaker: Prosper P. Parker

The 21st Arizona Territorial Legislative Assembly was a session of the Arizona Territorial Legislature which convened in Phoenix, Arizona. The session ran from January 21, 1901, till March 21, 1901. It was the first session of the territorial legislature to meet in the territorial capital building and overrode more vetoes than any other session.

== Background ==
The previous session of the legislature had authorized creation of a committee "to revise the laws and eliminate therefrom all crude, improper and contradictory matter and also to insert such new provisions as they may deem necessary and proper." The revised code proposed by the committee was based upon the civil code of Texas and the criminal code of California as was ready as the 21st session began.

In an effort to speed the statehood process, the 16th Arizona Territorial Legislature had authorized a constitutional convention for Arizona. The resulting 1891 document had not however resulted in statehood for the territory. Opposition coming first from Republicans who did not wish to see two new U.S. senators from the predominantly Democratic territory and later from Gold Democrats who opposed the proposed constitution's support for free silver.

Construction of the territorial capital building was completed in early 1901. Dedication of the building occurred on February 24, 1901, 38 years after passage of the Arizona Organic Act. The US$130,000 previously authorized for construction of a territorial capital building had proved insufficient with $5,744 in unfunded costs left unpaid.

== Legislative session ==
The session began on January 21, 1901, and continued from 60 days.

=== Governor's address ===
The address was given by Governor Murphy on January 22, 1901. The latest census data showed the territorial population had doubled during the 1890s to 122,212. High on the governor's list of changes was a revision to the territorial property tax system that utilized low assessed values combined with high tax rates. As an example, a mine valued at US$100 million may have an assessed value of only US$2&million. This allowed mine owners to reap large profits while paying relatively small tax bills.

On other concerns, Murphy wanted new reservoirs to be constructed to provide water for additional agricultural use. Toward this end he recommended supply canals be built to Indian reservations. This would allow the territory's indigenous population, with the possible exception of the Navajo, to become self-sufficient farmers and no longer need assistance from Federal agencies. Additionally the governor desired legislation to encourage additional railroad construction and development of new industries in the territory. Finally, Murphy asked for a new territorial prison to be constructed as a replacement for Yuma Territorial Prison.

=== Legislation ===
The proposed legal code revision authorized by the previous session was accepted and enacted into law with only minor modifications. The pension for Charles Debrille Poston was also increased from the US$25/month authorized by the previous session to US$35/month. No action was taken upon the governor's recommendation to modify the territorial property tax. A twelve-year tax exemption for factories that processed sugar beets and a ten-year tax exemption to railroads that constructed at least 10 miles (16 km) of new track annually were however granted. Preferring to update to replacement of the territorial prison, the session passed a special levy of 3.5¢ per $100 value over the governor's veto to fund prison renovations.

The session repealed a poll tax and implemented the local option for sale of alcoholic beverages. The session authorized organization of the Arizona Rangers with the new police force allowed to have one captain, one sergeant, and twelve privates. Territorial support for the national guard, cut by the previous session, was restored. A 10-year ban on shooting antelope was passed.

In other matters, Hail to Arizona! The Sun-Kissed Land was selected as the territorial anthem and the saguaro (cereus giganteus) blossom was selected to be the territorial flower. County supervisors were granted the authority to choose their county's commissioner of immigration. An appropriation of US$20,000 for a territorial exhibition at the 1904 St. Louis Exposition. Other appropriations included US$3000 for the Pioneer Historical Society to replace the funds that were misappropriated by Fred G. Hughes and a $1,500/year stipend for the territorial governor in addition to his normal salary. Finally the session created a new proposed state constitution based upon the document produced by an 1891 constitutional convention.

== Members ==
House of Representatives
Name	County	Name	County
Alexander Barker	Pinal	E. T. Ijams	Graham
Sam Y. Barkley	Pima	J. P. Ivy	Maricopa
William Beard	Pinal	Andrew Kimball	Graham
A. C. Bernard	Pima	William J. Morgan	Navajo
Thomas Edward Campbell	Yavapai	A. H. Noon	Santa Cruz
Joseph B. Corbett	Pima	Prosper P. Parker (Speaker)	Maricopa
Jessee E. Crouch	Yuma	Charles Peterson	Maricopa
B. A. Fowler	Maricopa	Stephen Roemer	Cochise
O. L. Geer	Yavapai	Kean St. Charles	Mohave
Richard Gibbons	Apache	James Walsh	Coconino
Mike Gray	Cochise	F. R. Ward	Yavapai
C. L. Houston	Gila	H. M. Woods	Cochise

Council
Name	County
H. T. Andrews	Yavapai
G. P. Blair	Pinal
M. G. Burns	Mohave
C. C. Campbell	Navajo
S. B. Claypool	Gila
J. B. Finley	Pima and Santa Cruz
J. M. Ford	Maricopa
Eugene S. Ives (President)	Yuma
E. S. Perkins	Apache
M. J. Riordan	Coconino
Charles M. Shannon	Graham
Charles C. Warner	Cochise
