= 11th Arizona Territorial Legislature =

Session of the Arizona Territorial Legislature (1881)

←	10th	12th	→

Overview
- Legislative body: Arizona Territorial Legislature
- Jurisdiction: Arizona Territory, United States
- Term: January 3, 1881 –

Council
- Members: 12
- President: Murat Masterson

House of Representatives
- Members: 24
- Speaker: J. F. Knapp

The 11th Arizona Territorial Legislative Assembly was a session of the Arizona Territorial Legislature which convened on January 3, 1881, in Prescott, Arizona Territory.

== Background ==
Since assuming office, Governor John C. Frémont had been mostly absent from his duties. The governor had left for Washington, D.C., on February 28, 1879, to lobby the territory's case in a dispute over the boundaries of the Gila River Indian Reservation. The trip was expected to take five or six weeks to complete. Frémont had not returned to the territory till August 1879. The governor had again left the territory on March 18, 1880. He did not return to Prescott till January 5, 1881. In response to these prolonged periods with no resident territorial governor, Territorial Delegate John G. Campbell said "So far we cannot tell what sort of Governor he will make as he has spent most of his time in the East."

While he was away, the non-partisan alliance that had controlled Arizona Territory during the McCormick and Safford administrations broke down. This allowed the territory's Democratic Party to organize an effective opposition to the Republican governor. The other signification change was the size of the legislature, which had been expanded to twelve members in the upper house and twenty-four members in the lower house.

== Legislative session ==
The legislative session began on January 3, 1881.

=== Governor's address ===
Governor Frémont's address to the session focused upon economic development. To this end he called for Federal aid in building water storage systems within the territory and increased trade with Mexico. To encourage additional capital investment in the territory's mines, the governor requested removal of all taxes levied on mining products. On other issues, Frémont recommended divorces be handled by the courts.

The regular address was followed on February 21, 1881, by a special message. In the message, Governor Frémont called for a 100-man force to be organized to fight banditry along and near the border with Mexico.

=== Legislation ===
The most important, and contentious action of the session was the creation of three new counties: Cochise, Gila, Graham. Of these, Cochise County generated the most objections. Creation of the county was opposed by interests in Tucson due to the diversion of tax income from their city to the new county seat. Tombstone had however managed to elect a disproportional level of representation to the session and was able to overcome the objections. The new county's name also generated opposition as Representative Sharp of Maricopa County objected to the county being named for Cochise due to the "depredation and murderous attacks of that bloodthirsty savage."

The towns of Phoenix, Prescott, and Tombstone were incorporated. A variety of bond issues were additionally authorized to fund construction of courthouses, jails, and other government buildings throughout the territory.

Acting upon the governor's recommendation, the territorial bullion tax on mined products was repealed. Frémont's request for a special force to fight crime along border with Mexico was refused. The previous session's creation of a territorial lottery was repealed, and gambling by minors prohibited.

== Members ==
House of Representatives
Name	District	Name	District
Jerome B. Barton	Apache	Donald Robb	Pinal
Peter J. Bolan	Maricopa	J. K. Rodgers	Pima
George E. Brown	Yavapai	John Roman	Pima
Andrew J. Doran	Pinal	Mariano G. Samaniego	Pima
Thomas Dunbar	Pima	Nathaniel Sharp	Maricopa
E. B. Gifford	Pima	E. H. Smith	Pima
John Haynes	Pima	M. S. Snyder	Pima
J. F. Knapp (Speaker)	Yuma	David Southwick	Mohave
M. K. Lurty	Pima	R. B. Steadman	Yavapai
John McCafferty	Pima	H. M. Woods	Pima
John McCormack	Maricopa	Louis Wollenberg	Yavapai
George W. Norton	Yuma	G. R. York	Apache

Council
Name	District
J. W. Anderson	Pinal
Albert C. Baker	Maricopa
Solomon Barth	Apache
A. Cornwall	Mohave
John W. Dorrington	Yuma
B. A. Fickas	Pima
Benjamin H. Hereford	Pima
Murat Masterson (President)	Yavapai
William K. Meade	Pima
H. G. Rollins	Pima
George H. Stevens	Pima
R. S. Thomas	Maricopa
