= James Bayard =

James Bayard may refer to:

- James Asherton Bayard (1859–1919), seventh Secretary of the Arizona Territory
- James Asheton Bayard I (c. 1730–1770), Philadelphia doctor, and father of James A. Bayard (politician, born 1767)
- James A. Bayard (politician, born 1767) (1767–1815), politician and lawyer from Wilmington, Delaware
- James A. Bayard Jr. (1799–1880), politician and lawyer from Wilmington, Delaware

== See also ==
- Bayard family
