= 29th Illinois Infantry Regiment =

29th Regiment Illinois Volunteer Infantry
- Illinois state flag
- Active: August 19, 1861, to November 6, 1865
- Country: United States
- Allegiance: Union
- Branch: Infantry
- Engagements: Fort Donelson, Battle of Shiloh, Siege of Corinth, Holly Springs Raid Vicksburg, Battle of Spanish Fort & Battle of Fort Blakeley

The 29th Regiment Illinois Volunteer Infantry was an infantry regiment that served in the Union Army during the American Civil War. Notable for its heavy involvement in the Tennessee River Campaign and later, the Battle of Mobile Bay, the regiment survived a mass surrender and parole early in the war and finished its service in Texas.

== Service ==
The 29th Illinois Infantry was organized at Camp Butler, Illinois , and mustered into Federal service on August 15, 1861. The regiment was initially attached to McClernand's Brigade. The regiment spent the autumn of 1861 operating near Cairo and participating in expeditions into Missouri and Kentucky.

In February 1862, the regiment was the first to enter Fort Henry following its evacuation. Shortly after, at the Battle of Fort Donelson, the 29th Illinois took positions at the extreme right of the Union line. They were among the first regiments to engage the Confederates and sustained 100 casualties, including 30 KIA on the Field.

=== Battles in Shiloh, Corinth, and Holly Springs ===
Under the command of Colonel M. Brayman, the regiment participated in the Battle of Shiloh, with 400 effectives, and sustaining 100 killed and wounded. Following the Battle, the regiment was engaged in the Siege of Corinth.

In December 1862, while the regiment was stationed at Holly Springs, Mississippi, General Earl Van Dorn launched a surprise raid, and 8 companies of the 29th Illinois were captured and paroled. These companies remained at Benton Barracks until July 1863, when they were officially exchanged and returned to duty.

During the Period of parole, the two remaining companies (D and K) were assigned to the Western Navy. They served during the Siege of Vicksburg, gaining distinction for running the batteries at Vicksburg and Grand Gulf on Union gunboats.

=== Mobile Campaign ===
In October 1863, the 131st Illinois was consolidated into the 29th, and Loren Kent was promoted to Colonel. In early 1864, the men re-enlisted as veterans.

By Early 1865, the regiment was transferred to the Military Division of West Mississippi for the Mobile Campaign. As part of the XIV Corps, the regiment participated in the Battle of Spanish Fort, where they had to march through impassable roads to join the siege on March 26th. They later participated in the Battle of Fort Blakely, where they supported the charge on April 9th, which resulted in the capture of the Confederate Fort and its remaining forces.

In total, the regiment lost 26 members during the Mobile Campaign.

Following the fall of Mobile, the Regiment was ordered to Galveston, Texas, arriving in July 1865. The unit spent several months of occupation duty, with companies spread out across Millican, Brenham, Beaumont , and Hempstead to maintain order during the early stages of Reconstruction.

The regiment was mustered out on November 6, 1865.

== Total strength and casualties ==
The regiment suffered 5 officers and 70 enlisted men who were killed in action or who died of their wounds, and 3 officers and 222 enlisted men who died of disease, for a total of 300 fatalities.

== Commanders ==
- Colonel James S. Reardon
- Colonel Mason Brayman
- Colonel Charles M. Ferrill
- Colonel Loren Kent - Mustered out with the regiment.

== See also ==
- List of Illinois Civil War Units
- Illinois in the American Civil War
