= John Baldwin Neil =

American military officer and politician (1842–1902)

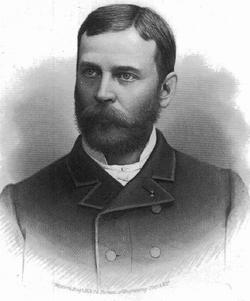

8th Governor of Idaho Territory
- In office August 3, 1880 – 1883
- Nominated by: Rutherford B. Hayes
- Preceded by: Mason Brayman
- Succeeded by: John N. Irwin

Personal details
- Born: July 28, 1842 Columbus, Ohio
- Died: October 6, 1902 (aged 60) Columbus, Ohio
- Party: Republican
- Spouse: Marion Jones

John Baldwin Neil (July 28, 1842 – October 6, 1902) was an American military officer and politician who served as Governor of Idaho Territory from 1880 to 1883.

== Early life ==
Neil was born in Columbus, Ohio on July 28, 1842. The son of Robert E. Neil, his father was a wealthy man and early settler in the Columbus area. He attended public schools before enrolling in the Kentucky Military Institute.

With the outbreak of the American Civil War, Neil enlisted in the Second Ohio Volunteer Infantry on April 17, 1861. During his three-month commitment, he saw action in First Battle of Bull Run. Neil returned to Ohio at the end of his enlistment and sought a commission. After helping to recruit a volunteer regiment, Neil was made a lieutenant on October 1, 1861, and saw his regiment attached to William Tecumseh Sherman's division under General Ulysses S. Grant.

Neil participated in the Western Theater of the American Civil War, being wounded during the Battle of Shiloh and seeing action during the Vicksburg and Chattanooga campaigns. For bravery upon the field, he was promoted to captain on April 14, 1864. During the Atlanta campaign, he fought in the battles of Resaca, Dallas, Ezra Church, and Lovejoy's Station before his promotion to major on January 23, 1865. At the end of the war, he mustered out at the rank of lieutenant colonel.

Neil married Marion Jones on September 5, 1871. The couple had two daughters, Florence, who died at age 10, and Edith. Professionally, he served as personal secretary to Governors Rutherford B. Hayes and Edward Follansbee Noyes, both of Ohio, following the war. After Hayes became President of the United States, he appointed Neil as register in the Salt Lake City land office.

== Political career ==
Neil was nominated to be Governor of Idaho Territory on July 12, 1880. Shortly after his appointment he received word that outgoing Governor, Mason Brayman, intended to call a reapportionment board and use his influence to give most of territory's southwestern legislative seats to the Mormon dominated southeastern section of the territory. Neil had originally planned to arrive in the territory in September, after wrapping up personal business in Salt Lake City. Upon learning of Brayman's plans he left early and arrived to take his oath of office on August 3, 1880. This allowed Neil to block Brayman's plans and ensure an apportionment more favorable to the territory's anti-Mormon elements.

Following the apportionment board meeting, Neil took a short leave of absence to return to Salt Lake City and take care of personal business. During his leave he had a meeting with President Hayes when the President stopped in Ogden, Utah during a tour of the West. The primary topic discussed during the meeting was how to deal the problem of polygamy among Idaho's Mormon population. The problem, as seen by the two men, was that despite bigamy being outlawed by the Morrill Anti-Bigamy Act and Poland Act it was practically impossible to prosecute violators as the grand juries and juries in the locations where plural marriage was practiced were dominated by Mormons who refused to punish their fellow church members.

To deal with the "Mormon menace", Neil proposed disenfranchisement of the Mormons to the 11th territorial legislature. The governor's proposed legislation was not passed but he did get several anti-Mormon officials appointed to territorial positions. Neil then traveled to Washington, D.C. to lobby for his anti-Mormon position and serve as a speaker at anti-polygamy meetings. The governor even used the assassination of President James A. Garfield as an excuse to rally against expanding Mormon influence in "Idaho, Arizona, and our other western Territories". Passage of the Edmunds Act in 1882 made conviction of polygamists easier.

Neil's removal as governor came on March 5, 1883, when President Chester A. Arthur nominated John N. Irwin as his replacement. The official reason for the removal was a series of vague accusations against the governor for issues such as drunkenness, laziness, unpopularity, incompetence, and absence from office. In fact, the governor was politically vulnerable due his appointment having been made by a previous administration and Arthur owing political favors to John P. Jones, a personal rival of Neil, and Frank Hatton, a friend of the newly named governor.

== After office ==
Neil's removal from office left the anti-Mormon forces in Idaho leaderless until Fred Dubois took up the cause three years later. He initially moved to the Wood River Valley where he had acquired business interests in some mining operations. Neil still influenced territorial politics as late as 1884 where differences between Neil and Dubois led to a split of the anti-Mormon vote.

In later life, Neil returned to his home state of Ohio. There he died of throat cancer in the city of Columbus on October 6, 1902.

Political offices
Preceded by Mason Brayman	Territorial Governor of Idaho; 1880–1883	Succeeded by John N. Irwin
