= Lawrence Cowan =

American politician (1858–1933)

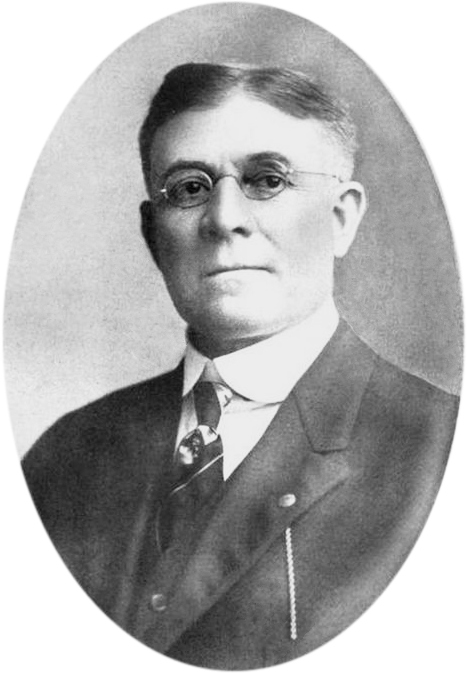

Member of the 19th Arizona Territorial Legislature
- In office 1897

Personal details
- Born: September 18, 1858 Due West, South Carolina, US
- Died: July 20, 1933 (aged 74) Tucson, Arizona, US
- Party: Democratic
- Education: Erskine College
- Profession: Politician, Businessman

Lawrence Oscar Cowan (September 18, 1858 – July 20, 1933) was an American judge, state legislator, city official, businessman, and miner in the Arizona Territory and state in the late 19th and early 20th centuries.

== Background ==
Cowan was born in Due West, South Carolina, the son of planter and merchant Captain John Cowan. He attended the local public schools and graduated from Erskine College before studying law in the state of Georgia. He was admitted to practice before the Georgia Supreme Court in 1882 and then moved to Arizona the same year, settling in Kingman.

== Kingman and first term in Legislature ==
There he continued to practice law, and had interests in cattle ranching and mining. He moved to San Diego, California, for a brief time before returning to Kingman and being elected a Probate Judge, serving in that position for four years and simultaneously he was the superintendent of county schools. He served as the clerk of the District Court of Mohave County for four years, and clerk of the Board of Supervisors. In 1895 he was elected Mohave County Recorder and in 1897 elected to the upper house of the 19th Arizona Territorial Legislature from Mohave County.

Near the end of the session, tensions grew between the House of Representatives and Governor Benjamin Joseph Franklin, a gold Democrat in a predominately free silver territory, leading Cowan to sponsor a resolution declaring "the best interests of the territory demanded an immediate change in the office of governor." The resolution was opposed in the Council which proclaimed it "has implicit confidence in the integrity and ability of our present governor."

== Tucson and second term in Legislature ==
In 1898, he moved to Tucson and was elected to the 22nd legislature in 1902 representing Pima County.

=== Cowan Bill ===
Acting upon a recommendation by Governor Brodie, he introduced what came to be known as the Cowan Bill which raised significant revenue for Arizona. Under the original laws of the territory, the territorial secretary, who approved and recorded articles of incorporation for companies incorporating in the territory, was entitled to keep the fees charged as part of his salary. The secretary at the time, Isaac T. Stoddard was receiving an estimated $40,000 per year (about $1,550,000 per year in present-day terms) in fees, and he had built a side business that assisted foreign businesses to incorporate under Arizona law. His earnings were harshly criticized. The bill made incorporation fees revenue to the territory treasury. The Cowan Bill passed in the state assembly 13 to 5, despite Stoddard's active opposition. By 1905, Arizona was receiving over $50,000 per year in incorporation fees.

== Later life ==
Cowan was the Tucson city recorder for twenty-two years beginning in 1910, which at the time made him also the city clerk and a city police court judge.

== Personal ==
Cowan married Rosalie Rice Ogden of California in December 1883 with whom he had two daughters, Florence and Edith. In 1888, he opened Kingman Soda Works and manufactured sodas including sarsaparilla, ginger ale and soda water.

He lost part of his thumb when closing the breech of his gun on it while attempting to shoot a large cat.

He was also a partner with US Senator Marcus A. Smith in a Sonora, Mexico, copper mine. The pair were awarded possession of the mining claim by the Supreme Court of Mexico in 1904, after losing cases in lower courts, and regained the claim from three Mexican claim jumpers.

Cohen died July 20, 1933, in Tucson and was buried at Evergreen Memorial Park.
