= Winfield Scott (chaplain) =

American Baptist minister, military officer, and politician (1837–1910)

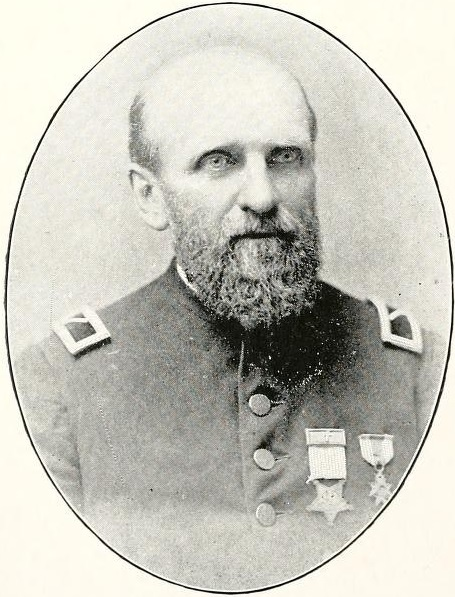
- From 1901's Companions of the Military Order of the Loyal Legion of the United States
- Born: February 26, 1837; West Novi, Michigan, U.S.
- Died: October 19, 1910 (aged 73); Phoenix, Arizona, U.S.
- Burial place: Mount Hope Cemetery, San Diego, California, U.S.
- Alma mater: University of Rochester; Rochester Theological Seminary
- Spouse: Helen Louise Brown (m. 1859–1910)
- Children: 4
- Relatives: Frank Herman Albright (son in law)
- Military career
- Allegiance: Union (American Civil War); United States
- Service: Union Army; United States Army
- Service years: 1862–1864 (Union); 1882–1893 (Army)
- Rank: Captain (Union); Major (Army)
- Units: 126th New York Infantry Regiment (Union); U.S. Army Chaplain Corps (Army)
- Wars: American Civil War
- Memorials: Winfield, Kansas; Scottsdale, Arizona
- Other work: Clergyman; Farmer

Winfield Scott (February 26, 1837 – October 19, 1910) was an American Baptist minister, military officer, and politician. Shortly after graduating from seminary and taking his first job as a pastor, he left his church to lead a company during the American Civil War. Injuries sustained on the battlefield eventually led to his discharge from the military. Following the war, Scott moved to Kansas where he grew one church and established several others.

Scott continued in ministerial and evangelical efforts in Colorado and California before becoming a U.S. Army chaplain. After retiring from the army, Scott moved to the Salt River Valley where he founded and was active in the early promotion of Scottsdale, Arizona. Scott is known to have preferred the style "Chaplain, U.S.A." to "Reverend" or "Pastor".

== Early life ==
Scott was born to James Burt and Margaret E. (Covert) Scott in West Novi, Michigan, on February 26, 1837. His family moved to Interlaken, New York when he was a child. Scott was baptized into the Baptist church in February 1853. He graduated from the University of Rochester in 1859 and Rochester Theological Seminary in 1861. Scott married Helen Louise Brown on July 13, 1859. The union produced four daughters. Scott's daughter Minnie was the wife of brigadier general Frank Herman Albright.

A Baptist church in Syracuse, New York called Scott as their pastor following his graduation from seminary. He left this position in 1862 to raise a company to fight in the American Civil War and was commissioned a captain in the U.S. Volunteers. Scott became known as the "Fighting Parson" while he commanded Company C, 126th New York Volunteers. He was wounded during the Battle of Harpers Ferry and twice each during the battles at Gettysburg and Spotsylvania Court House. As a result of his injuries, Scott was medically discharged from the military on September 23, 1864.

== Continued career ==
Following the war, Scott became pastor for the First Baptist Church of Leavenworth, Kansas. During his six years in Leavenworth, his church grew from 19 to 250 members and he organized churches in three nearby communities. The city of Winfield, Kansas, was named in Scott's honor after he promised to build a church there. Scott moved to Denver, Colorado, where he served as a pastor January 1872 to September 1875. He moved to California in late 1875 and was editor of Evangel from February through October 1876. Scott was called to the pastorate of a church in Los Angeles in 1877. In 1878 he was Associate Pastor Metropolitan Church in San Francisco. Also in 1878, Scott received the honorary degree of Doctor of Divinity from the University of California. Scott served at churches in Petaluma and Oakland before becoming pastor of a church in San Jose, California, in February 1880.

Scott became an U.S. Army Chaplain in 1882, a position he held til 1893. He was initially served at Fort Canby and Fort Stevens before transferring to Angel Island in 1885. In February 1888, Scott visited the Salt River Valley. Valley leaders hoped the chaplain would help promote the area. Scott was so impressed he purchased 640 acres (260 ha) of land in the valley for US$2.50/acre. The plot he chose was abutted the soon to be completed Arizona Canal. Scott transferred to Fort Huachuca in 1893 and made frequent visits to his property. His brother, George Washington Scott, meanwhile moved to Arizona Territory. There he cleared the land of brush and began planted citrus orchards. Scott moved to his homestead in 1893 on terminal leave. Health problems caused by his old war wounds prompted his retirement. Formal retirement occurred on March 26, 1889.

== Later life ==
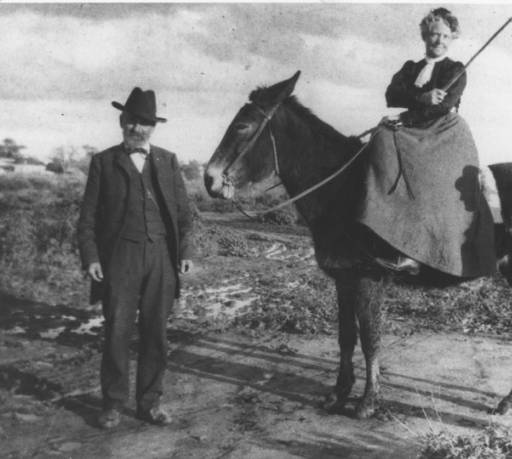
Winfield Scott and his wife Helen pose in 1900 with their mule "Old Maud" in Scottsdale, Arizona, where they established a homestead in 1888.

As the first person to grow peanuts, citrus trees, and grapes in the Salt River Valley, Scott advocated the area's potential as a health resort as well as its agricultural potential. Within a few years of Scott's arrival there were a number of families living near his ranch. Scott and his wife founded the Arizona Baptist Foundation and became part of the area's local leadership. In 1896 the area added a school and the settlement around Scott's ranch was officially named Scottsdale.

Scott's influence extended beyond just Scottsdale. In 1897, Governor Myron H. McCord appointed him Chaplain of the Arizona National Guard. He was elected to represent Maricopa County in the lower house during the 1899 session of the territorial legislature. During the session, he was a leader in efforts to limit gambling and the liquor trade but was unsuccessful in efforts to pass legislation limiting either. As part of his efforts, he announced his intentions to give a three-hour speech on the evils of gambling before the legislature but the session adjourned for the day five minutes after he began his speech. Ministerially, Scott was pastor of the Lone Star Baptist Church (now First Baptist Church) in Prescott from September 1899 till August 1900. He organized churches in Naco, Arizona and Douglas, Arizona in 1902 and was named Chaplain in chief of Grand Army of the Republic in 1903. Scott was appointed to the Arizona Board of Regents in 1902 and served as Chancellor (board chairman) the next year. In 1906, Scott made an unsuccessful run for the Arizona Territorial Legislature.

In 1909, Scott moved to San Diego, California. While in Phoenix, Arizona, he became ill and underwent surgery to treat a strangulated hernia shortly before his death on October 19, 1910. Scott was buried at Mount Hope Cemetery in San Diego. San Diego's Scott Memorial Baptist Church (now Shadow Mountain Community Church) is named in his honor.
