= Prosper P. Parker =

Canadian-born American engineer and politician (1835–1918)

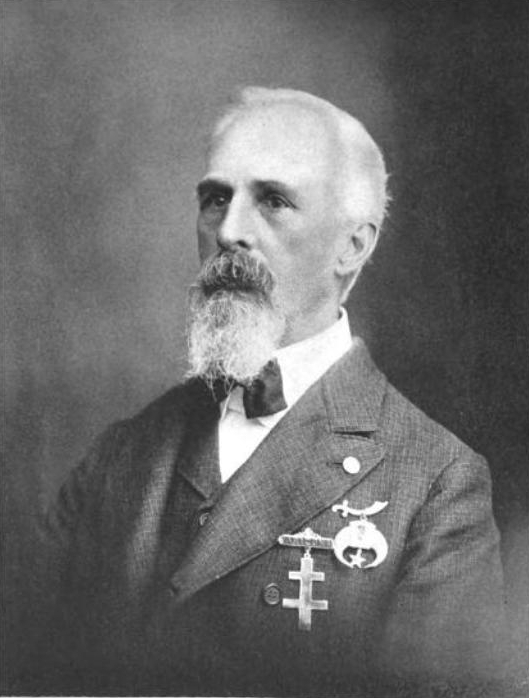
- Born: December 26, 1835; Barnston, Quebec, Canada
- Died: March 16, 1918 (aged 82)
- Burial place: Greenwood Memorial Cemetery, Phoenix, Arizona
- Spouse: Susan F. Herrick (m. 1865; died 1911)
- Children: 3

Prosper Powell Parker (December 26, 1835 – March 16, 1918) was a Canadian-born American engineer and politician. During the American Civil War he served as a junior officer under General William T. Sherman, rising to the rank of captain. Following the war he served on the committee that organized Towner County, North Dakota, before moving to Arizona Territory. In Arizona he was twice elected to the territorial legislature and became Speaker of the House during the 21st Arizona Territorial Legislature.

== Biography ==
Parker was born to Alpheus and Susan Roxanna (Crooker) Parker on December 26, 1835, in Barnston, Lower Canada. His father was a local farmer while his mother was from Vermont. Young Parker was educated in local schools and at Barnstown Academy. At age 18, he began teaching in local schools before working a year as a clerk at a store in Magog, Province of Canada.

In 1858, Parker accepted a position as a school teacher in Bloomington, Indiana. He took a similar position in Pike County, Missouri, after one term. During the summer of 1859, he traveled with an ox cart to the Pikes Peak area near the present location of Denver, Colorado. After a summer of prospecting he returned to his teaching position in Missouri.

At the beginning of the American Civil War in 1861, Parker joined the Home Guard and became a first lieutenant for Company C, 6th Missouri Militia. After several months, Parker transferred from state to federal service and became part of Company H, 32nd Missouri Volunteer Infantry where he served under General William T. Sherman. During the war he saw action during the Battle of Arkansas Post, the Siege of Vicksburg, the Chattanooga campaign, and the Atlanta campaign. Despite participating in multiple battles, Parker was not wounded during the war. Following the capture of Atlanta, Parker's regiment began mustering out excess officers. He was promoted to captain in July 1864 and discharge from the Union Army before the end of the year.

Parker married Susan F. Herrick of Missouri in January 1865. The union produced a daughter and three sons: Angie Belle, Earl H., Henry Clay, and James A.

Following his wedding, Parker worked as a farmer and in a store before being elected register of deeds for Pike county and serving as a clerk for the district court. After four years working in government he became a railroad contractor, first for the Chicago & Alton Railroad and then the St. Louis, Hannibal & Keokuk. During this time he also studied surveying. In 1884, Parker moved to Devils Lake, North Dakota, where he engaged in farming and ranching. Parker served as a county court clerk and was appointed to a commission that organized Towner county, including selection of the county seat and construction of the county court house.

Parker became a contractor for the South Gila canal in Yuma County, Arizona Territory, in 1888. In April the next year he moved to Phoenix where he would make his home for the rest of his life. Parker worked as a mining and civil engineer and specialized in irrigation projects. He promoted the Rio Verde canal and performed surveying work for the project. Parker was president of both the Rio Verde Canal Company and the Arizona Copper Mountain Mining Company, which operated mines in the New River mining district.

Politically, Parker was a member of the Democratic party. He was elected to represent Maricopa county during the 19th Arizona Territorial Legislature. During the session, he was an advocate of the bill funding construction of a capitol building. He won a second term during the election of 1900. The 1901 session of the legislature was the first to utilize the new capital building and Parker was selected to be Speaker of the House for the session. During the terms of Governors Franklin and McCord, Parker served as an aide-de-camp at the rank of lieutenant colonel. He was also a member of the Democratic territorial central committee. Socially, Parker was a 32° Mason as well as a member of the Knights Templar and Nobles of the Mystic Shrine. Other memberships included the Grand Army of the Republic, Sons of the American Revolution, and the Arizona Society of Civil Engineers.

Parker's wife, Susan, died on June 12, 1911. Parker died on March 16, 1918. He was buried in Phoenix's Greenwood memorial Cemetery.
