= Mason Brayman =

American politician (1813–1895)

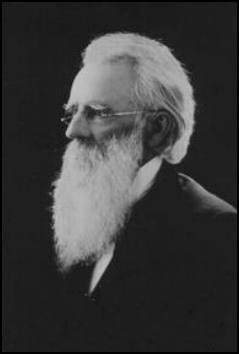

7th Governor of Idaho Territory
- In office July 24, 1876 – August 3, 1880
- Nominated by: Ulysses S. Grant
- Preceded by: David P. Thompson
- Succeeded by: John Baldwin Neil

Personal details
- Born: May 23, 1813 Buffalo, New York
- Died: February 27, 1895 (aged 81) Kansas City, Missouri
- Party: Republican
- Spouse: Mary Williams Brayman 1816-1886
- Profession: printer, attorney, military officer, politician

Military service
- Branch/service: United States Army; Union Army
- Years of service: 1861–1865
- Rank: Brigadier General Bvt. Major General
- Commands: 29th Illinois Infantry Regiment
- Battles/wars: American Civil War; Battle of Fort Donelson; Battle of Shiloh

Mason Brayman (May 23, 1813 – February 27, 1895) was an American attorney, newspaperman, and military officer. During his service to the Union Army during the American Civil War, he rose to the rank of major general with the 29th Illinois Volunteer Infantry. Later in life, he became the seventh governor of the Idaho Territory.

== Early life ==
Brayman was born in Buffalo, New York on May 23, 1813. Raised with a Calvinist outlook and a hatred of liquor, he was apprenticed to a printer at the age of 17. Five years later, he became editor of a local newspaper. In addition to his work with newspapers, he studied law and was admitted to the New York Bar in 1836.

The year after his admission to the bar, Brayman married a woman named Mary. She was a direct descendant of Roger Williams, and they had two daughters and a son. Following his marriage, Brayman began a series of westward moves, working as a city attorney in Michigan and newspaper editor in Ohio, before settling in Springfield, Illinois, during the early 1840s.

== Illinois ==
In Springfield, Brayman practiced law with Jesse B. Thomas Jr., and wrote editorials for the town's newspapers. In addition to spending time with persons such as Abraham Lincoln and Stephen A. Douglas, he oversaw the American Baptist Publishing Society, was active in the temperance movement, and was a leader of the local Baptist church.

In 1844, Brayman gained statewide prominence by accepting a commission from Governor Thomas Ford to revise the Illinois legal code. Two years later he was commissioned as a special prosecutor to deal with incidents occurring during the Illinois Mormon War. In this capacity he devised the agreement which allowed the Mormons to leave Illinois.

In the 1850s, Brayman joined the staff of the Illinois Central Railroad, working to gain rights of way for the expanding railroad. In 1855, he sold his position with the Illinois Central and took a position with the Cairo and Fulton Railroad. This move proved to be a financial blunder as the new railroad eventually failed, while the Illinois Central prospered. During 1858, Brayman campaigned for Abraham Lincoln's Illinois senate candidacy.

== Civil War ==
With the outbreak of the American Civil War, Brayman joined with other railroad executives and secured a military commission. Initially serving as a major with the 29th Illinois Volunteer Infantry Regiment under General McClernand, he was promoted to colonel on April 15, 1862, and command of his regiment. Following the Battle of Fort Donelson, Brayman stopped shaving and grew a beard that would eventually reach his belt. He also had his horse shot out from under him twice. At Shiloh he became a minor hero, rallying his troops by charging between the Union and Confederate lines. During the Siege of Vicksburg he suffered a bout of heatstroke that forced him into garrison duty. By the end of the war, he had achieved the rank of Major General and was serving as head of a claims commission in New Orleans. Major General Mason Brayman was the highest-ranking Civil War officer to have lived in the Lincoln's neighborhood. Mason Brayman – 42 years old, served as a Major General with the 29th IL Volunteer Infantry. He lived in the neighborhood two times—once as a renter in the Lincoln Home and once as a renter in what is now called the Shutt House.

Following the war, Brayman attempted to revive his career with the Cairo and Fulton before returning to work as a newspaper editor in Springfield and Quincy, Illinois. In 1873, he entered semi-retirement on a farm in Ripon, Wisconsin; however, the Panic of 1873 destroyed most of his wealth, and by 1876 he was lobbying for a patronage appointment.

== Idaho ==
Brayman was nominated by President Ulysses S. Grant as Governor of the Idaho Territory on July 24, 1876. Being unfamiliar with the territory, the new governor consulted with the territorial delegate, Stephen S. Fenn, to learn what he could of his new appointment. Fenn was a Democratic politician who gained much of his support from the territory's Mormon population. The delegate was also a rival of the Boise Ring, a clique of influential Anti-Mormon Republican politicians. The delegate used the opportunity to accuse Territorial Secretary and Acting Governor E. J. Curtis of drunkenness, fraud, and misuse of public funds. Fenn's advice, combined with Brayman's natural inclinations, created a distrust of the Ring by the new governor.

Upon his arrival in Idaho, the locals initially considered Brayman to be a somewhat pompous greenhorn who was otherwise harmless. The new governor, in turn, acted with caution while learning about the territory. Opinions of the governor changed, however, when the 9th legislative session began in December 1876 and Brayman promoted a number of administrative improvements and economic reforms. At the same time, Brayman observed during the legislative session that there were political factions within the territory opposed to the Boise Ring.

Brayman's first confrontation with the Boise Ring came two days before the inauguration of Rutherford B. Hayes as President of the United States. An investigation had convinced the governor that Secretary E. J. Curtis, whom Brayman considered to be a leader of the Boise Ring, was guilty of wrongdoing. The governor confronted the secretary and convinced him that he was to be replaced by the new administration and could avoid prosecution by submitting his resignation. The situation changed two months later when Curtis rescinded his resignation, claiming he had been tricked into giving it, and demanding reinstatement. Curtis was restored to his position and cleared of any wrongdoing.

The outbreak of the Nez Perce War led to additional problems for the governor. Lacking a legal basis for the creation of a militia, Brayman was forced to rely upon General Oliver O. Howard's response to the hostilities. This caused anger among residents of the northern counties who lacked the means to defend themselves against the hostile tribe. Additional problems came for the governor following a visit to Rocky Bar courthouse in Alturas County. The court faced a large backlog of cases involving mining disputes, and the delays thus caused were affecting the local economy. Brayman suggested that involved parties come to out-of-court settlements as a means of speeding resolution. Chief Justice Madison Hollister, presiding justice and member of the Boise Ring, took this suggestion as a personal affront. The Ring in turn used the incident as an excuse to seek Brayman's disbarment. Brayman prevailed during the disbarment hearing but was publicly humiliated in the process.

The governor's troubles continued to mount as a result of a racially charged murder trial. A dispute arose on June 10, 1877, between a group of Chinese workers and hot-tempered Irish miner John McGuinness. The dispute escalated to violence, and McGuinness killed two of the workers and wounded a third before the remaining workers stabbed him to death. The workers were convicted of second degree murder by an all white jury. Brayman, believing the Chinese had acted in self-defense, chose to pardon the convicted workers, and the white population reacted angrily to the pardons.

Additional pressure came upon Brayman as a result of the May 30, 1878, outbreak of the Bannock War. The 130 carbines held by the territory were insufficient to arm the citizens seeking protection. Demands from the territory's residents for weapons to defend themselves eventually led the governor to seek permission to issue arms from the federal stockpile at Fort Boise. Complicating the governor's position was the revelation that Brayman had authorized Bannock leader Buffalo Horn, a former army scout with a history of aiding the U.S. government, to purchase US$2 worth of ammunition (roughly 100 bullets and a pound of black powder) 13 days before outbreak of hostilities.

=== Replacement ===
On June 9, 1878, word arrived in Idaho that John Philo Hoyt had been appointed the territory's new governor. Hoyt, who at the time was Governor of Arizona Territory and as unaware of the action as Brayman, was being removed by President Hayes to make way for John C. Frémont, who had used his political connections to secure an influential appointment. Hoyt was unsure about the situation and was denied Senate confirmation after failing to respond to questions in a timely manner. Hayes then renominated Hoyt for the position, but Hoyt turned down the nomination after investigating the situation in Idaho.

The effect of this was that Brayman, while technically suspended, was still the de facto governor. His political opponents, eager to see him gone, lobbied Hayes to appoint another replacement; however, Brayman still maintained considerable influence outside of the territory and used his connections to petition for reinstatement. Within the territory, there were four petitions circulated expressing support for the embattled governor, one by Mormon residents, one in the northern counties, and two by anti-Ring groups. With the conflicting opinions about Brayman, the Hayes administration decided to leave the governor in office till the expiration of his term on July 24, 1880.

The remainder of his term saw Brayman's influence largely blocked by political infighting with pro-Ring elements. An effort to pass a militia bill during the 10th legislative session passed the upper house, but the governor was unable to pressure the lower house to pass the legislation. Similar results occurred with efforts to bring railroad service to the southern portion of the Territory. The Territory's unwillingness to pass subsidy legislation caused the railroads to lose interest in routes that crossed the Territory in favor of other alternatives.

Brayman's final efforts to defeat the Boise Ring came in his efforts for reapportionment. In 1879, he took a leave of absence to return to the East Coast and lobby the U.S. Congress for changes. Unsuccessful in this effort, he was forced to wait till after the 1880 Census, when the governor would lead a three-man commission overseeing the allocation of territorial representation. His successor, John Baldwin Neil, was named and arrived in the territory to take the oath of office before Brayman was able to complete his plans.

== Later life ==
Brayman left Idaho on August 19, 1880, though his departure did not end his influence on Idaho politics. Lewiston-based newspaper editor Alonzo Leland, looking for a rallying point against the Boise Ring, nominated the former governor to be the Territorial delegate to the U.S. Congress during the 1880 campaign. As a result, Brayman received 904 of the 938 votes cast in the northern counties. This support was insufficient for victory, however, as the southeastern and southwestern counties completely ignored Brayman's candidacy. Brayman died of Bright's Fever in Kansas City, Missouri, on February 27, 1895. Obituaries printed at the time tended to praise his earlier years while giving only passing mention to his time in Idaho.

== See also ==
- List of American Civil War generals (Union)

Political offices
Preceded by David P. Thompson	Territorial Governor of Idaho; 1876–1880	Succeeded by John Baldwin Neil
