= 131st Illinois Infantry Regiment =

131st Regiment Illinois Volunteer Infantry
- Illinois state flag
- Active: October 25, 1862, to November 13, 1865
- Country: United States
- Allegiance: Union
- Branch: Infantry

The 131st Regiment Illinois Volunteer Infantry was an infantry regiment that served in the Union Army during the American Civil War.

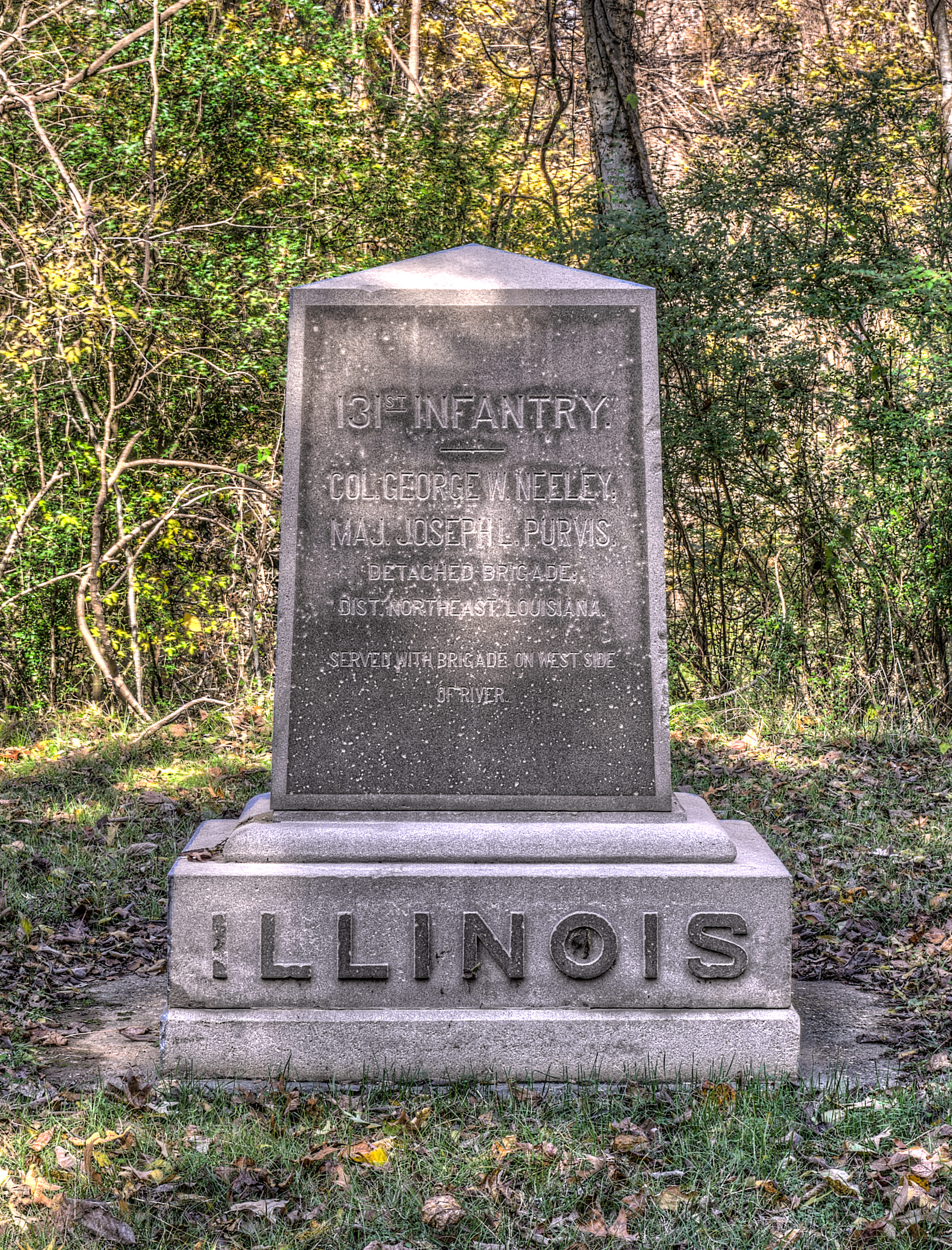
Memorial at Vicksburg National Military Park

== Service ==
The 131st Illinois Infantry was organized at Old Fort Massac, Illinois, and mustered into Federal service on November 13, 1862, for a three-year enlistment.

The regiment was consolidated with the 29th Illinois Volunteer Infantry Regiment on November 15, 1863.

== Total strength and casualties ==
1 enlisted man killed, 11 officers and 282 enlisted men who died of disease, for a total of 294 fatalities.

== Commanders ==
- Colonel George W. Neely.

== See also ==
- List of Illinois Civil War Units
- Illinois in the American Civil War
