= 20th Arizona Territorial Legislature =

Session of the Arizona Territorial Legislature (1899)

←	19th	21st	→

Overview
- Legislative body: Arizona Territorial Legislature
- Jurisdiction: Arizona Territory, United States

Council
- Members: 12
- President: Morris Goldwater

House of Representatives
- Members: 24
- Speaker: Henry F. Ashurst

The 20th Arizona Territorial Legislative Assembly was a session of the Arizona Territorial Legislature which convened in Phoenix, Arizona. The session ran from January 16, 1899, to March 16, 1899.

== Background ==
Myron H. McCord had replaced Benjamin Joseph Franklin as Governor of Arizona Territory on July 29, 1897. With the Spanish–American War approaching, McCord had resigned to join the Rough Riders. Oakes Murphy had been sworn in as his successor on August 1, 1898. At the time of the session, efforts to build a territorial capital building were underway with the construction contract being awarded on February 13, 1899.

== Legislative session ==
The session began on January 16, 1899, and ran for 60 days. During this time, the legislature passed 69 new laws.

=== Governor's address ===
Governor Murphy's address was thorough and straight forward. After praising the Arizona volunteers who had fought in the Spanish–American War, he provided an overview of territorial finances. On the issue of taxation, Murphy felt large corporations were not paying their fair share. Toward this end he argued that the owners of small properties paid taxes based upon the full value of their properties but large businesses had the means to disguise the true value of their holdings and thus reduce their tax burden.

In other matters, Murphy recommended an overhaul of the territorial legal code. Possible reforms to how the territorial Board of Control operated were discussed. He also suggested the territory implement women's suffrage. Not wishing to see a territorial building in Flagstaff used as either a reform school or insane asylum, the governor asked for the building to be used as a normal school. Murphy recommended the Pioneers' Historical Society collect as much materials as practical or else "all living witnesses will soon be gone and the opportunity lost of obtaining relative information." Finally, the governor reminded session that they should send a memorandum to the United States Congress if they wished to increase the size of the legislature from 24 to 32 members in the House and 12 to 16 in the Council as it would take an Act of Congress to realize the change.

=== Legislation ===
Desiring an overhaul of the territorial legal code, the session authorized creation of a commission "to revise the laws and eliminate therefrom all crude, improper and contradictory matter and also to insert such new provisions as they may deem necessary and proper." No progress was achieved on addressing the problems with the territorial system as a variety of bills dealing with the issue were introduced but failed to pass. The session did however grant a fifteen-year tax exemption to new water development projects while new railroads received a ten-year exemption.

Toward territorial organization, Santa Cruz County was created from southern Pima County. A bill to reallocate the territorial building in Flagstaff for use as a normal school was introduced by House Speaker Henry F. Ashurst. This resulted in the establishment of Northern Arizona Normal School (now Northern Arizona University). An appropriation of US$30,000, in addition to the US$100,000 authorized by the previous session, for construction of a territorial capital building was authorized. The session established a US$6250 contingency fund "for the apprehension of criminals, or escaped patients for the Territorial Insane Asylum, and for other expenses incidental thereto, for the printing of election and other proclamations, and all necessary expenses."

In other matters, a bill to restrict the number of hours miners could work underground and to create an office of mine inspector was defeated. The session cut off financial support from the territory for the National Guard. A compulsory education bill passed requiring children between 8 and 14 years of age attend at least 12 weeks of school each year. A $25/month pension was granted to Charles Debrille Poston. Finally, the session passed a resolution expressing grief over deaths of Captain Buckey O'Neill and other Arizona volunteers during the Spanish–American War.

== Aftermath ==
Governor Murphy appointed John C. Herndon, Charles Wright, and L. H. Chalmers to the commission recommending changes to the territorial legal code. Following Chamber's death, Richard E. Sloan was appointed to the commission in December 1900. The next session of the legislature passed the commissioned recommendations with only minor modification.

== Members ==
House of Representatives
Name	County	Name	County
W. S. Adams	Yavapai	Otis Hale	Pima
James E. Arthur	Pinal	William Imus	Mohave
Henry F. Ashurst (Speaker)	Coconino	A. A. Moore	Yavapai
S. A. Bartleson	Pinal	William W. Pace	Graham
J. W. Benham	Maricopa	W. A. Parr	Navajo
Samuel Brown	Maricopa	Charles Peterson	Maricopa
John Doan	Yuma	George Pusch	Pima
Alfred S. Donau	Pima	J. J. Sanders	Yavapai
Henry W. Etz	Cochise	Winfield Scott	Maricopa
John C. Evans	Gila	F. A. Stevens	Pima
Nasianceno Gonzales	Apache	E. Milton Williams	Graham
Mike Gray	Cochise	H. M. Woods	Cochise

Council
Name	County
T. S. Bunch	Coconino
J. H. Carpenter	Yuma
J. B. Finley	Pima
Aaron Goldberg	Maricopa
Morris Goldwater (President)	Yavapai
George W. P. Hunt	Gila
John M. Murphy	Mohave
George A. Olney	Graham
David K. Udall	Apache
Charles C. Warner	Cochise
George A. Wolff	Navajo
Austin C. Wright	Pinal

== See also ==
- List of Arizona territorial and state legislatures
