= 19th Arizona Territorial Legislature =

Session of the Arizona Territorial Legislature (1897)

←	18th	20th	→

Overview
- Legislative body: Arizona Territorial Legislature
- Jurisdiction: Arizona Territory, United States

Council
- Members: 12
- President: Fred G. Hughes

House of Representatives
- Members: 24
- Speaker: D. G. Chalmers

The 19th Arizona Territorial Legislative Assembly was a session of the Arizona Territorial Legislature which convened in Phoenix, Arizona. The session began on January 18, 1897, and ended on March 18, 1897.

== Background ==
A long running feud within the territory's Democratic Party had come to an end with the removal of L. C. Hughes as governor on March 30, 1896. He was replaced by Benjamin Joseph Franklin. The effects of the Panic of 1896 had been felt in the territory. Despite this, the territorial government's financial outlook remained solid. The territory's cattle and mining industries continued to expand and new settlers kept arriving. Work to construct the grounds for a territorial capitol were under way but no capitol building had yet been authorized.

== Legislative session ==
The session began on January 18, 1897. Of the 320 bills introduced, 88 were signed into law. A number of vetoes by Governor Franklin caused animosity between himself and the House of Representatives. This included 11 pocket vetoes at the end of the session.

=== Governor's address ===
The governor was sick at the time the session began. This resulted the address being delayed until the afternoon of January 28. The governor was present while the address was read to the session members by the governor's son, Alfred. At roughly 20,000 words, the address was considered to be of "unusual length" and spoke of the territory's glorious future potential. In many respects the speech was an argument for statehood as well as the traditional address. It began by complimenting the session member's honor, intelligence, and patriotism. Franklin then asked for the legislators to practice financial restraint and to not be hasty in the performance of their duties.

Speaking about the territory's development, Franklin noted the territorial population had reached an estimated 101,000 with opportunities for future growth if additional acreage could be put to agricultural use through new irrigation projects. Mining continued to be the territory's largest economic engine with US$14 million in revenue during 1896. Cattle ranching and farming followed with an estimated revenues of US$3 million and US$2 million each. Enrollment at the University of Arizona had reached 149 students with 16,936 children enrolled in the territory's schools.

The National Guard had grown to 488 officers and men within the territory. With the cities of Phoenix, Prescott, and Tucson employing a total of three police officers, crime rates on a per capita basis were still lower in Arizona than on the East Coast. Meanwhile, discipline at Yuma Territorial Prison was described as "firm, but kindly."

Governor was concerned about tax avoidance, saying "The burden of taxation is pt to rest most heavily upon the citizen of small and fixed holdings, rather than upon the one possessed of large wealth which is variously invested, and therefore more intangible and difficult to reach." Towards this end he called for the railroads, which he called "quasi public corporations", to pay a more in taxes, arguing "the State guarantees to every citizen a security for his person and his property, and those who, of niceness must expect the most protection should, and of right ought to give the largest return thereof."

=== Legislation ===
One of the first actions taken by the session was a revision of the territorial livestock laws. Cattle ranchers were please when the system of county level brand registration was replaced by a new system operated at the territorial level. The new system simplified most of the registration requirements and prevented brand duplication within the territory. Another law encouraged conservation of wild game and mountain trout.

Permission to construction of a territorial capitol building was granted. The permission included a US$100,000 bond authorization. A compulsory education bill passed but vetoed by the governor. Meanwhile, Flagstaff's reform school was converted into an insane asylum and special tax was authorized for creation of a new reform school in Benson. The Santa Fe Railroad was granted permission to purchase the bankrupt Atlantic and Pacific Railroad. Additionally, new railroads were given a fifteen-year exemption from taxes.

During the session, a number of newspaper editors visited the legislature seeking payment for services provided to previous sessions. The visits soon reached nuisance levels and the House, as a joke, passed a bill making it a felony to publish or edit a newspaper within the boundaries of the territory. Penalty for violation was set at 10 to 20 years in the territorial penitentiary. The Council never gave the House bill serious consideration and by the end of the session payments of US$72 to each of the daily newspapers and US$36 to the weeklies was authorized.

Two legislative actions caused unforeseen future problems. In the first, the three sections of the territorial penal code that defined homicide were repealed and replaced by a new definition. The change the side effect of creating a legal loophole which overturned most past murder convictions and forced charges against those awaiting trial to be dropped. Dozens of murders were left unpunished, including those allegedly committed by the Apache Kid and Black Jack Ketchum's gang members. The second was a $3,000 appropriation to the Arizona Pioneer's Historical Society so that the society could collect mementos and testimonials from the territory's earliest settlers. The President of the Council, Fred G. Hughes, embezzled roughly two-thirds of this appropriation to pay off gambling debts and was imprisoned in Yuma Territorial Prison before being paroled.

As the session drew to an end, tensions between the House of Representatives and Governor Franklin, a gold Democrat in a predominately free silver territory, grew. The cause of the animosity was a series of vetoes issued by the governor, including bills granting tax reductions to irrigation projects, mine smelters, and sugar beet factories along with pay increases for county employees. This resulted in the House passing a resolution sponsored by L. O. Cowan declaring "the best interests of the territory demanded an immediate change in the office of governor." The Council responded by tabling the resolution and passing another proclaiming "that it has implicit confidence in the integrity and ability of out present governor, the Honorable B. J. Franklin."

== Members ==
House of Representatives
Name	County	Name	County
Henry F. Ashurst	Coconino	W. J. Mulvenon	Yavapai
A. C. Bernard	Pima	Prosper P. Parker	Maricopa
D. G. Chalmers (Speaker)	Pima	J. B. Patterson	Apache
Lawrence O. Cowan	Mohave	A. J. Preston	Pima
J. B. Finley	Pima	C. D. Reppy	Pinal
Aaron Goldberg	Maricopa	J. J. Riggs	Cochise
J. C. Goodwin	Maricopa	William Speed	Cochise
Hiel Hale	Yuma	J. K. Rogers	Graham
G. W. Hull	Yavapai	George W. Skinner	Graham
Leroy Ikenberry	Gila	Jesse N. Smith	Navajo
J. N. Jones	Cochise	D. J. Warren	Yavapai
C. P. Mason	Pinal	James W. Woolf	Maricopa

Council
Name	County
F. T. Aspinwall	Navajo
Solomon Barth	Apache
Peter R. Brady	Pinal
J. H. Carpenter	Yuma
A. A. Dutton	Coconino
Collins R. Hakes	Maricopa
Fred G. Hughes (President)	Pima
George W. P. Hunt	Gila
W. H. Lake	Mohave
D. H. Ming	Graham
J. W. Norton	Yavapai
B. A. Packard	Cochise
