= Charles A. Shibell =

American sheriff (1841–1908)

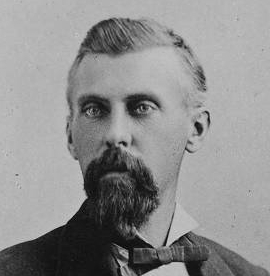
- Charles A. Shibell
- Born: August 14, 1841; St. Louis, Missouri
- Died: October 21, 1908 (aged 67); Tucson, Arizona
- Occupations: Miner, customs inspector, Pima County Sheriff, county recorder
- Known for: Pima County Sheriff at the time of the Gunfight at the O.K. Corral
- Spouse(s): Mercedes Sais Quiroz; Nellie Norton

Charles A. Shibell (August 14, 1841 – October 21, 1908) was a teamster, miner, hotel owner, customs inspector, recorder, and Pima County, Arizona County Sheriff and a contemporary of Wyatt Earp and his brothers. Shibell promised a job as Deputy Sheriff to Earp, but when Earp announced his support for Bob Paul as the next sheriff, Shibell appointed Earp's antagonist Johnny Behan to the position instead.

== Personal life ==
Charles Alexander Shibell was born on August 14, 1841, to George and Mary Agnes (Byrne) Shibbell in St. Louis, Missouri where he attended public school. He attended Iowa College (later renamed Grinnell College). In 1860, he left Iowa for Sacramento, California, where he got a job as a clerk in a general store. He later moved to the Southwest where he married Mercedes Sais Quiroz in 1868. Mercedes had been kidnapped as a child with Larcena Pennington Page in March 1860 by Apache Indians. She was later traded for Apache prisoners. Mercedes and Charles Shibell had four children: Mamie A., Lillie M., Charles B. and Mercedes A., before his wife died in 1876 at age 26. In 1877, Shibell married Nellie Norton and they had two children, Lionel J. and Orpha.

== Professional life ==
In 1862, just as the Civil War was beginning, he joined Col. James H. Carleton's California Column. He worked as a civilian teamster and was with the Union forces when they re-captured Tucson, Arizona, from Confederate forces on May 20, 1862. He followed the force to the Rio Grande and remained there until January 1, 1863, when he returned to Tucson. He worked for the federal government transporting supplies 300 miles (480 km) from the headquarters at Tucson to Ft. Yuma. In 1864, the troops were ordered to the Rio Grande where they would be mustered out, and Shibell remained in Tucson.

In June 1864, he went to work at the Cerro Colorado Mine as a silver miner about 75 miles (121 km) southwest of Tucson. In May 1865, he moved to the Sonoita River about 30 miles (48 km) south of Tubac, Arizona, participating in the cowboy business before operating his own cattle ranch. His ranch was repeatedly attacked by Apache Indians and he lost cattle on several occasions to the Indians, until two or three of his men were killed. Unable to withstand the Apache's attacks, he left the area in 1867 and returned to Tucson. He became a Customs Inspector for the next two years. He may have been a participant in the Camp Grant Massacre on April 30, 1871, during which 144 Aravaipas and Pinal Indians were killed and mutilated, almost all of them women and children.

He then opened a stagecoach stop named Desert Station on the road 26 miles (42 km) northwest of Tucson which he maintained through 1872. He also resumed the teamster business that year between Tucson and Yuma.

In 1874, Shibell, a lifelong Democrat, developed an interest in politics. In January 1875, he was appointed a Pima County Deputy Sheriff by Tucson Mayor William S. Oury and held the office for two years.

He ran for Sheriff in 1876 and held that office for four years, until 1881. He was responsible for enforcing the law for 3,000 citizens spread out over 12,000,000 acres (4,900,000 ha) on the extremely remote border with Mexico, a wide-open area on the edge of the American frontier.

On August 19, 1878, Shibell and a citizen posse tracked Arizona and New Mexico Territory road-agent William Whitney Brazelton, who was suspected of repeated stagecoach robberies in the Tucson area, to a meeting place where he expected to receive supplies from a confederate named David Nemitz. Nemitz warned that Brazelton "would not be taken alive unless by artful strategy." Shibell gave orders to shoot on sight if needed, and Brazelton was killed during the confrontation in a mesquite bosque along the Santa Cruz River approximately three miles south of Tucson. Shortly thereafter, Brazelton's body was photographed by pioneer Tucson photographer Henry Buehman and copies of these were available for sale to the general public. Additionally, John J. Valentine Sr. Wells, Fargo & Co. would, as a direct response to Brazelton's criminal actions in Pima County, send special agent and future sheriff of said county, Bob Paul, to investigate on their behalf." Shibell was reelected Sheriff in 1878.

On July 27, 1880, Shibell appointed Wyatt Earp Deputy Sheriff in Pima County, when Tombstone, Arizona, was still part of Pima County, making Earp the primary law enforcement officer for most of eastern Pima County.

=== Election overturned ===
Shibell ran for reelection as Pima County Sheriff in the November 2, 1880, election against Republican Bob Paul. The region was strongly Republican and Paul was expected to win. Whoever won would likely appoint someone from the same political party. Republican Wyatt expected he would continue in the job.

Shibell was supported in his reelection bid by a loosely organized federation of outlaw Cowboys, mostly Southerners, who strongly opposed Wyatt Earp and the Republicans generally. A cowboy in that time and region was generally regarded as an outlaw. Legitimate cowmen were referred to as cattle herders or ranchers.

Elections were held on November 2, and it was expected that Democrat Shibell would be defeated by Republican Bob Paul, who Wyatt had supported during the campaign. Shibell won the election by a 58-vote margin.

On November 19, Bob Paul filed suit and accused Shibell of ballot-stuffing in the San Simon precinct, since the precinct delivered a 103 to 1 vote for Shibell in a precinct that contained only about 10 eligible voters. The trial was transferred to Tucson's district court and began in January 17. On January 20, 1881, the Arizona Star reported, "There has been some big cheating somewhere, and by some persons. It was clear that there had been reckless counting at Tombstone, fraud at San Simon and a careless election board at Tres Alamos." A recount was held and this time Paul had 402 votes and Shibell had 354. Sixty-two were kept from a closer examination.

James Johnson later testified for Bud Paul in the election hearing and said that the ballots had been left in the care of Democrat Phin Clanton. Meanwhile, a week after the election on November 9, 1880, Earp resigned. The position of undersheriff was now open, and Shibell immediately selected Democrat Johnny Behan to serve as Tombstone area undersheriff.

In February 1881, the San Simon results were thrown out by the election commissioners, but Shibell filed an appeal. He was finally removed from office in April and replaced by Bob Paul.

=== Operates hotels ===
When his term as Sheriff ended, he bought and ran the Palace Hotel (later renamed the Occidental Hotel). In 1884, he opened a store until 1887 when he was once again appointed deputy sheriff under Sheriff Eugene O. Shaw. He was deputy sheriff until January 1, 1889. On February 22, 1888, Shibell along with U.S. Deputy Marshal William K. Meade and deputies pursued men suspected of robbing a Southern Pacific train deep into Mexico. When they finally notified Mexican authorities of their purpose in Mexico, they were arrested for entering the country illegally.

It was during his second appointment as deputy sheriff that Shibell challenged an old friend, a former guide and scout for the U.S. Army named Albert Franklin Banta, the reputed discoverer of Meteor Crater, to track down a fugitive 900 miles into Old Mexico and back. He returned with his prisoner, saying he "had one horse shot; missed being assassinated three or four times, but I am here yet, telling the story."

In 1888, Shibell was elected as the Pima County Recorder, a position he held until 1902. Shibell died in Tucson on October 21, 1908.
