= William K. Meade =

American politician (1851–1918)

William Kidder Meade (Note: Some sources give Meade's middle name as "Kettle".) (September 21 or 26, 1851 – March 15, 1918) was an American politician who served as a United States marshal and two-time member of the Arizona Territorial Legislature.

== Biography ==
Meade was born in Clarke County, Virginia to Virginia and William Meade on either September 21 or 26, 1851. He was educated in private schools before leaving home in 1868. He lived in St. Louis, Missouri and Denver, Colorado for a short time before moving to Elizabethtown, New Mexico where he worked as a store clerk for two years. After New Mexico, Meade moved to Utah, Nevada, San Francisco, and San Diego before accepting a job at the Silver King Mine in 1876.

After settling in Arizona Territory, Meade invested in mining operations around Florence and became active in Democratic Party politics. He also served as a deputy sheriff in Florence. Meade represented Pinal County in the lower house during the 1879 session of the territorial legislature.

Meade moved to Tombstone shortly after the boomtown was founded. There he gained ownership interests in several local mines. Income from these interests allowed him to purchase several houses in both Tombstone and Tucson. He returned to the territorial legislature during the 1881 session, this time representing Pima County in the upper house. Following the Gunfight at the O.K. Corral, Meade sided with Sheriff Johnny Behan against the Earps.

In 1884, Meade was a delegate to the Democratic National Convention During the convention he requested Grover Cleveland appoint him as Governor of Arizona Territory. He did not receive the requested appointment but was instead appointed U.S. marshal for Arizona Territory on July 8, 1885. Several months later, Meade organized the liberation of newly appointed Arizona Territorial Governor C. Meyer Zulick from imprisonment in Mexico. In 1887, Meade married Helen S. Stevens. The couple had no children and divorced in 1906.

Arizona Territory experienced a series of train robberies in 1887. Speculation among area lawmen was that outlaws had moved to Arizona from New Mexico Territory where a new law had instituted the death penalty for train robbery. On February 22, 1888, a Southern Pacific train was held up, with the U.S. mail being rifled through and an estimated loss of $240,000 in coins and railroad bonds. Meade, embarrassed by the number of train robberies that had occurred under his watch, went in pursuit the next day. He was accompanied by Pima County Sheriff M. F. Shaw, Undersheriff Charles A. Shibell, W. G. Whorf, and four experienced Papago trackers. Shaw and Whorf left the posse after several days. The rest of the posse continued to Janos, Chihuahua, the customs house closest to the trail they were following. In Janos, Meade requested Mexican authorities continue the pursuit and offered to pay expenses and associated duties. The Mexican authorities instead arrested Meade and his associates. The resulting two week imprisonment created a small international incident. While Meade was being held, Southern Pacific Railroad detective Bob Paul obtained permission from Mexican authorities to pursue the train robbers, capturing them near Cusihuiriachi.

Following his initial appointment, Meade had advocated a policy of tolerance with the territory's Mormon population and hired several Mormon deputies. Any resulting goodwill evaporated in May 1889 after the Wham Paymaster Robbery resulted in the arrest of seven prominent members of the Mormon community. A reward of $500 had been offered for each arrest and Meade was accused of making the arrests in an attempt to collect the reward. When the suspects were acquitted at trail, Meade received the majority of the blame for the failed prosecution. Meade left his position as U.S. marshal on March 4, 1890.

Meade remained active in politics after leaving office. He made an unsuccessful run to become a delegate to Arizona's 1891 constitutional convention. He was appointed Superintendent for Prisons on April 24, 1893 but the 17th Arizona Territorial Legislature refused to confirm his appointment. By this time, Grover Cleveland had returned to the White House and Meade was reappointed U.S. marshal on May 8, 1893. His second time in office allowed his to achieve partial vindication for the results of the Wham trial when he arrested a relative of one of the trial defendants in connection to a January 6, 1894 train robbery. Meade resigned as U.S. marshal on June 15, 1897.

After leaving the marshal's office, Meade went to Alaska where he engaged in some mining interests. He then moved back to Tombstone a short time later. During his final years, Meade served on the Cochise county draft board. Meade died in his home in Tombstone on March 14, 1918.
