= John W. Dorrington =

American politician

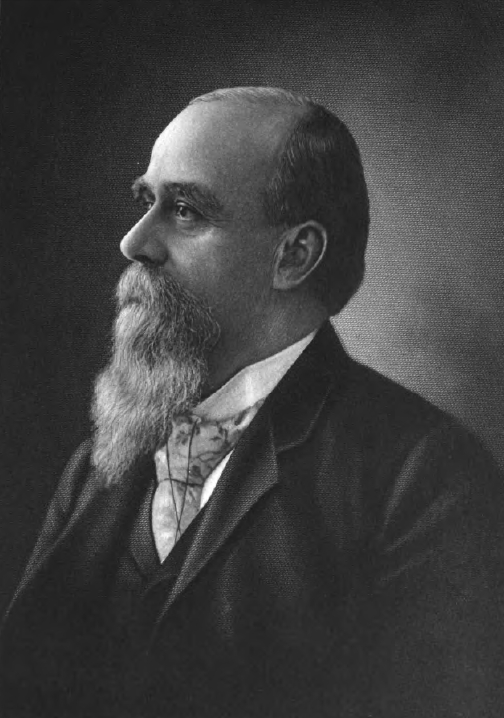
John W. Dorrington

John Webster Dorrington (June 16, 1843 – September 18, 1916) was an American newspaper editor and politician. He was elected to the Arizona Territorial Legislature five times and served as owner, editor, and publisher of the Arizona Sentinel for thirty years.

== Biography ==
Dorrington was born in Utica, New York, to David and Ann (Wood) Dorrington on June 16, 1843. He attended local schools and the nearby Elmira Academy. He moved to Falls City, Nebraska, in 1859, joining his parents who had moved there two year earlier. From 1862 till 1864, Dorrington was a member of the 2nd Nebraska Cavalry and saw action in Dakota Territory as part of the American Indian Wars.

After leaving the military, Dorrington became a postal carrier and served a route between Topeka, Kansas, and Falls City, Nebraska. His importance in Falls City grew and he served as councilman, mayor and acting sheriff of the town.

Dorrington moved to Yuma, Arizona Territory with his brother-in-law, Justice Isham Reavis, in 1869. Following his arrival, he worked as an assistant to the court and United States commissioner. The same year he arrived in Yuma, Dorrington acquired a partial interest in the Arizona Sentinel and became a journalist. In 1881, he purchased full control of the Sentinel and became the paper's editor and publisher.

Politically, Dorrington was active in Republican politics. He was elected to the House of Representatives (lower house) during the 1877 and 1883 sessions of the territorial legislature. He was a member of the Council (upper house) during the 1881, 1885, and 1889 sessions. Dorrington represented Arizona Territory as a delegate to the 1896, 1900, 1904, and 1908 Republican National Conventions. In July 1897, Governor Myron H. McCord appointed him Superintendent of prisons. Socially, Dorrington was a 33rd degree Mason.

In addition to his newspaper, Dorrington had a variety of other business interests and real estate holdings. This included his position as Director of the First National Bank of Yuma. Sold the newspaper on July 1, 1911 He sold the Sentinel in July 1911. He died on September 18, 1916, while visiting Honolulu, Hawaii, with his sister. His body was interred in a family mausoleum in Falls City, Nebraska's Steele Cemetery.
