= Fred G. Hughes =

American miner, gambler, and politician (1837–1911)

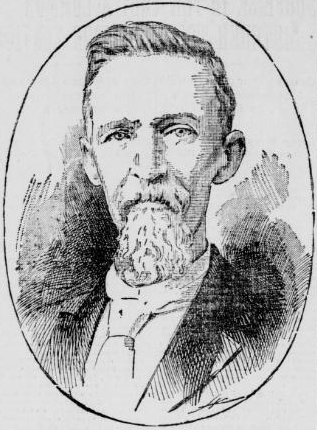
Fred G. Hughes

Frederick G. Hughes (March 30, 1837 – September 16, 1911) was an American miner, gambler, and politician. He was elected to five terms in the Council (upper house) of the Arizona Territorial Legislature, serving as President of the Council on three occasions. Hughes' political career came to an end when it was discovered he was embezzling funds from the Arizona Pioneers' Historical Society. His life ended when he was struck by lightning.

== Background ==
Hughes was born on March 30, 1837, in Cheltenham, England. He immigrated to the United States with his parents when he was five. Hughes was educated in New York City public schools. In 1853, he journeyed to San Francisco, California, by way of the Isthmus of Panama.

In California, Hughes worked as a miner near Placerville, California. He moved to the Washoe region of Utah Territory for a brief time in 1860. While there he fought in the Paiute War. Hughes returned to California before the end of 1860.

With the outbreak of the American Civil War, Hughes joined the California Column. During his service, he passed through what would become Arizona before continuing to the Rio Grande valley. There he was for a time alcalde of San Martial, New Mexico Territory. Hughes relocated to Arizona as part of a military escort assigned to protect the territorial officials for the newly created Arizona Territory. When the party of officials were delayed, the escort proceeded from Fort Craig to the new territory without them on October 23, 1863. On December 18, 1863, Hughes was assigned to a unit of 12 men left to guard supplies at San Francisco Springs, a site near the present day city of Flagstaff. From there he proceeded to Fort Whipple, arriving on March 1, 1864.

Hughes moved to southern Arizona in 1876 when he began placer mining in the Santa Rita Mountains. His findings during the effort led to creation of the Greaterville mining district and for the rest of his life he prospected the area on a regular basis. This led to Hughes making his home in Tucson. Hughes was married twice. His first wife, Sophia Barcelo, died in December 1889. Hughes married his second wife, her younger sister Eliza Barcelo, in 1890.

Politics became a part of Hughes' life in 1877 when he represented Pima County in the 9th Arizona Territorial Legislature. Two years later he was reelected to the 10th Arizona Territorial Legislature and was selected the President of the Council for the session. During the 1879 session, Hughes sponsored a bill creating a US$300/quarter licensing fee for gambling halls. Hughes' third term in the Council came during the 1883 session. He became President of the Council a second time during the 16th Arizona Territorial Legislature. The session also marked an unsuccessful attempt by Hughes to create "Miles" county from portions of Cochise and Graham counties.

A compulsive gambler who from time to time played professionally, Hughes' habit influenced the appointment of Governor L. C. Hughes (no relation) as Governor of Arizona Territory. A picture of Hughes dealing a faro game to a group that included a Negro, a Chinaman, and two Anglos was sent to President Cleveland with a note reading "Here is Mr. Hughes' opponent's principal supporter at his daily work." The photograph helped L.C. Hughes gain the nomination to become governor.

The 19th Arizona Territorial Legislature marked Hughes' final term in office and he was once again selected to be President of the Council. During the session, a $3,000 appropriation was made to the Arizona Pioneers' Historical Society to allow the group to collect personal narratives and relics of the territory's early pioneers. In addition to his legislative role, Hughes was also the society's president and worked as clerk for the Pima County Board of Supervisors. After a shortage was discovered in the board's accounts, Hughes was informed on October 12, 1897, that a warrant would be issued in his name if the deficiency was not corrected. That night a fire started in the courthouse cellar under the Board of Supervisor's offices. The fire was discovered and extinguished before causing serious damage. The next day Hughes was found to be missing. Further investigation determined roughly $2,000 was missing from the historical society's accounts and that Hughes had lost the money while gambling. Hughes was believed to have fled to Mexico. From there he went to California, where he was arrested in the town of Randsburg and extradited back to Arizona in January 1898. Two of his friends paid back the missing Board of Supervisors funds, but Hughes still faced charges involving the missing historical society money. When the matter came to trial in March 1898, Hughes pleaded guilty to the embezzlement charges. He was sentenced to 5 years at Yuma Territorial Prison but was paroled on December 25, 1900.

Hughes died in Greaterville, Arizona, on September 16, 1911, when he was struck by a lightning bolt. He was survived by his second wife, seven daughters, and three sons. Hughes was buried in Tucson's Holy Hope Cemetery.
