= William Brazelton =

Old west outlaw and conman

William Whitney Brazelton
- Born: 1849; Linn County, Missouri
- Died: August 22, 1878 (aged 28–29); Tucson, Arizona
- Other names: Brazen Bill, Brazzelton, Whittington
- Occupations: freight hauler; confidence man; highway robber
- Known for: Outlaw of the Old West

William "Brazen Bill" Brazelton was an outlaw and stage robber of the Wild West.

== Alleged early life ==
After his death, an 1878 account claimed that Brazelton had come from San Francisco, California; had been orphaned and lived in an old boiler; had killed a man at the age of 15, and then killed a seven-man posse near Silver City, New Mexico. In 1902 John Clum repeated these claims of Brazelton's early life; however Clum did not furnish any references for his claims. Brazelton's name does not appear on either the 1860 or 1870 US Census records. Historian Erik J. Wright has published widely on the life and crimes of William Brazelton, yet has concluded that his life remains shrouded in mystery.

== Coming to Arizona ==
About 1876 Brazelton came to the courthouse in Prescott, Arizona, and claimed that in a show he would eat a wagon wheel. After collecting money he left by explaining he would rustle up the rest of the troupe; of course he never returned.

In 1877 Brazelton resided in Tucson, Arizona, where he hauled products such as hay and grains.

== Career ==
Brazelton's mode of robbery was to wear a mask over his face and carry a pistol and rifle in one hand while ordering the driver and passengers to hand over any valuables.
He is alleged to have committed nine stage robberies in Arizona and New Mexico: three near Silver City (including Cook's Canyon) New Mexico; two in northern Arizona and four near Tucson.

== Suspected/known robberies ==
- April 28, 1877, the stage going North between "Socoro and Las Lunas" (sic -- presumably Socorro, New Mexico, and Los Lunas, New Mexico, respectively) on the Rio Grande was robbed of three bars and a one box silver. {Letter from H.M. Porter, Silver City N.M.} {A Brazelton robbery{?}
- September 27, 1877, the California and Arizona Stage 12 miles north of Wickenburg, Arizona, was held up; among the passengers were Alexandra, Arizona, founder and mine owner Ed. G. Peck. The Express box was opened up and the mail bags were ripped. $1,900 in gold coins and gold dust was taken; although the initial report claimed that two robbers were involved, Brazelton is named as the sole stage robber
- May 28, 1878, the stage from Silver City, New Mexico, at Cook's Canyon was held up. Among the passengers were a Paymaster Colonel Willard and his clerk, a Lt. Frank West of the 6th Cavalry Regiment, and a traveling agent named Hathaway. Taken was valuable registered mail; $26.00 to $27.00 and an old silver watch from Willard and $13.00 taken from the driver and other passengers.
- July 31, 1878 the stage robbed at Point Mountain 18 miles from Tucson, Arizona. Among the passengers was newspaper editor John Clum. The express box (empty) and two mail bags (containing nothing of value) were thrown down. $37.00 was robbed from the passengers. Among items taken was a registered package containing a pair of earrings.
- August 15, 1878 the stage robbed at Point Mountain 18 miles from Tucson, Arizona. The express box and the mail bags were thrown down. $234.00 was robbed from the passengers.

== End of career ==
A horse used by Brazelton in his last robbery was traced to the possession of David Nemitz; Nemitz was arrested and agreed to help bring in Brazelton in return for protection from him; Pima County Sheriff Charles A. Shibell led a five-man posse that killed Brazelton two miles south of Tucson, Arizona on August 22, 1878. Wright's last study on the outlaw pinpointed the site of his death to the southeast corner of what is now Mission and Ajo in Tucson, Arizona. Brazelton had on his person two cartridge belts; two pistols; a Spencer gun; his mask; earrings from the Point Mountain Robbery; and a gold watch, among other items. Brazelton's body was photographed twice, first masked and then unmasked.
