= 12th Arizona Territorial Legislature =

Session of the Arizona Territorial Legislature (1883)

| ← | 11th | 13th | → |

Overview
- Legislative body: Arizona Territorial Legislature
- Jurisdiction: Arizona Territory, United States
- Term: January 8, 1883 –

Council
- Members: 12
- President: Edwin H. Wiley

House of Representatives
- Members: 24
- Speaker: Winthrop A. Rowe

The 12th Arizona Territorial Legislative Assembly was a session of the Arizona Territorial Legislature which convened on January 8, 1883, in Prescott, Arizona Territory.

== Background ==
Lawlessness was rampant across sections of the territory. While the Apache Wars were largely over, "cowboy" troubles in and around Cochise county had resulted in the Gunfight at the O.K. Corral and Arizona War. Added to this issue was banditry along the Mexican border and sporadic Indian uprisings. As a result of these and other issues, President Chester A. Arthur had accepted John C. Frémont's resignation and appointed Frederick Augustus Tritle as Governor of Arizona Territory. To deal with the outlaws, Tritle had requested permission to create a group of Arizona Rangers, modeled upon the Texas Rangers, but been denied authorization from the U.S. Congress.

The other big issue of the day was progress on bringing the railroads to the territory. The Southern Pacific Railroad had completed building across the southern portion of Arizona while the Atlantic and Pacific Railroad was preparing to build across the northern part of the territory.

== Legislative session ==
The session began on January 8, 1883.

=== Governor's address ===
Governor Frederick Augustus Tritle gave his address to the session at 7:30 pm on January 9, 1883. In regards to the criminal activity in the southern sections of the territory he said, "The recent feuds in Cochise County make it incumbent upon, not only officials, but all good citizens as well, to take such positive measures as will speedily rid this section of that murderous, thieving element which has made up a reproach before the world, as so seriously retarded the industry and progress of our country." Much of the speech emphasized Arizona's future opportunities and sought ways to develop the territory's natural resources. The governor highlighted the facts that mine production was increasing, transportation infrastructure improving, and an ample supply of timber was available to harvest. To insure adequate future supplies, Tritle asked for restrictions on the export of timber from Arizona. To ensure needed access to water, the governor requested federal funds for construction of artesian wells. He also asked for a survey of mineral springs in the hope that some would be found to have therapeutic value. In other matters, Tritle called for recreation of the territorial attorney general position, revision of voter registration laws, and reapportionment of the territorial legislature. Finally, to end the need of sending mentally ill residents to California, the governor called for building a territorial insane asylum.

=== Legislation ===
Upon the advice of Governor Tritle, the session issued a memorandum thanking President Chester A. Arthur for his assistance dealing with lawless elements in and around Cochise County. They then prohibited carrying a deadly weapon within town boundaries in Apache and Graham counties. The position of territorial attorney general was recreated during the session. Meanwhile, Maricopa and Graham counties were given permission to each build a jail and courthouse.

Dealing with the territory's organization, the section of Yavapai County north of the Colorado River and west of Kanab Creek was transferred to Mohave County. The territorial capital, Prescott, was incorporated. The seat of Graham County was moved to Solomonville.

In other matters, the territorial bullion tax was repealed. Before session all members of the legislature who had expressed an opinion had opposed its repeal. Despite this the legislation made it through both houses without trouble. Finally, the session authorized a US$500 prize for the person who could produce, in 1883, the largest cotton yield on a 5 acres (2.0 ha) parcel with a stipulation that a minimum yield of 200 pounds (91 kg) per acre was required for the prize. The prize was claimed by Felix G. Hardwick of Tempe who had produced 3,390 pounds (1,540 kg) of cotton on his 5-acre plot.

== Members ==
House of Representatives
| Name | District | Name | District |
|---|---|---|---|
| Alfred Allen | Yavapai | James P. Holcomb | Maricopa |
| J. W. Anderson | Pinal and Pima | L. J. Lassell | Mohave |
| R. C. Brown | Pima | Nehemiah McCollum | Yavapai |
| Robert Connell | Yavapai | C. A. Randall | Yavapai |
| John W. Dorrington | Yuma | Winthrop A. Rowe (Speaker) | Yavapai |
| James F. Duncan | Cochise | W. H. Savage | Cochise |
| John Ellis | Yavapai | D. Snyder | Pima |
| J. H. Fawcett | Pima | Adolphe Solomon | Graham |
| Charles A. Franklin | Apache | Charles Taylor | Yavapai |
| E. B. Gifford | Pima | D. K. Wardwell | Cochise |
| E. H. Gobin | Yavapai | Sam F. Webb | Maricopa |
| William Graves | Gila | Moye Wicks | Pima |

Council
| Name | District |
|---|---|
| F. K. Ainsworth | Yavapai |
| Peter J. Bolan | Graham and Cochise |
| J. W. Davis | Pinal and Pima |
| Morris Goldwater | Yavapai |
| Fred G. Hughes | Pima |
| J. F. Knapp | Pima |
| H. E. Lacy | Apache |
| A. D. Lemon | Maricopa and Gila |
| Murat Masterson | Yavapai |
| Edmund W. Wells | Yavapai |
| Lamson S. Welton | Mohave and Yuma |
| Edwin H. Wiley (President) | Cochise |
