= James Asherton Bayard =

Seventh Secretary of the Arizona Territory (1859–1919)

James A. Bayard

7th Secretary of Arizona Territory
- In office December 3, 1885 – June 1901
- Nominated by: Grover Cleveland
- Preceded by: Hiram M. Van Arman
- Succeeded by: Oakes Murphy

Personal details
- Born: February 26, 1859 Baltimore, Maryland, U.S.
- Died: January 6, 1919 (aged 59) Asheville, North Carolina, U.S.
- Resting place: Old Swedes Cemetery; Wilmington, Delaware, U.S.
- Party: Democratic
- Spouse: Ora Deakins (m. 1886)

James Ashton Bayard (February 26, 1859 – January 6, 1919) was an American government official who served as the seventh Secretary of the Arizona Territory.

== Biography ==
=== Early years ===
Bayard was born to Thomas Francis and Louisa Sewell (Lee) Bayard in Baltimore, Maryland on February 26, 1859. His family lived in Wilmington, Delaware before moving to Philadelphia, Pennsylvania in 1870.

By 1885, Bayard was teaching at a school in Fort Pendleton, Garrett County, Maryland.

=== Appointment as Secretary of the Arizona Territory ===
On June 22, 1885, the 26-year old Bayard wrote to United States Secretary of the Interior Lucius Q. C. Lamar asking to be appointed Secretary of New Mexico Territory. A second letter dated September 14 of that same year indicated he would also accept the secretary post in Arizona Territory.

Bayard's perseverance paid off and on November 7, 1885, the Maryland resident was appointed Territorial Secretary of Arizona by Democratic President of the United States Grover Cleveland. Bayard thereby became the seventh Secretary of the Arizona Territory, the second-ranking executive position in the government, serving in the administration of fellow Cleveland appointee Governor C. Meyer Zulick.

The initial reaction to Bayard's appointment in the Arizona press was hostile. The Arizona Weekly Citizen disapproved of Bayard's appointment, declaring that he lacked the experience needed for the position and that his appointment was only due to his father being the United States Secretary of State. The Arizona Daily Star, published in Tucson, echoed these negative sentiments, opining that Bayard had "followed the profession of a dude; then he started out to be a tough, succeeding so well as to be able to kick the glass out of hacks when he was on a spree, and winding up now and then in the police station on charges of disorderly conduct. His next effort was to try to get in jail as a fighter. He had nearly succeeded when he was bundled off to Delaware as a school teacher."

Bayard set out for the west shortly after his appointment, arriving in Prescott the night of December 7, 1885. The Arizona Daily Star found Bayard in the flesh to be quite unlike the unflattering caricature which had preceded him, indicating that the new Territorial Secretary was "a very pleasant appearing gentleman, a little over six feet tall" who was "of slender build and very courteous and pleasant in his manner."

Bayard was sworn in to office on December 9, 1885, and assumed his duties on Thursday, December 10. He would remain at the post for the next fifteen years.

=== Policies and achievements ===
Upon taking office, Bayard learned that his predecessor had failed to leave a file detailing the territory's finances.

A second problem revolved around a law requiring all public monies be placed in a U.S depository, the closest of which was in San Francisco. Transfer of funds was accomplished by sending the money by rail to Ash Fork, Arizona Territory and then shipping it to Prescott by stagecoach. Wells Fargo & Company was unwilling to accept the security risk for the transfer, thereby making the territorial secretary responsible for security. Cashing bank drafts in Prescott banks was another option, but the banks charged a 0.5% fee to cash drafts from the federal depository, and there were no legally authorized funds to pay the bank fees.

== Death ==
James Asherton Bayard died from tuberculosis in Asheville, North Carolina on January 6, 1919. He was buried in the Old Swedes Cemetery in Wilmington, Delaware.
