= John Philo Hoyt =

American judge and politician (1841–1926)

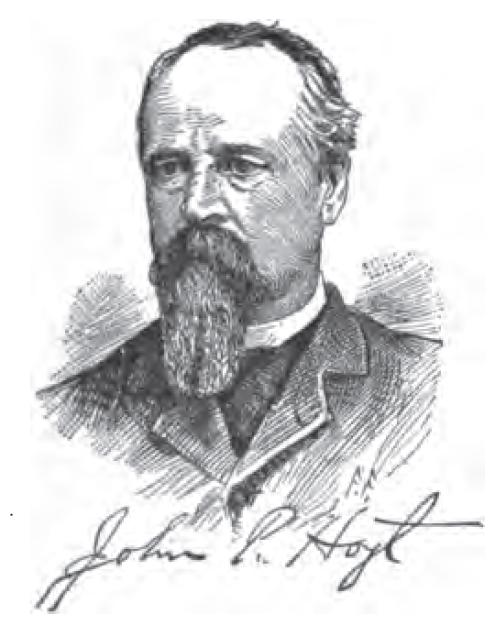

4th Governor of Arizona Territory
- In office May 30, 1877 – October 6, 1878
- Nominated by: Rutherford B. Hayes
- Preceded by: Anson P.K. Safford
- Succeeded by: John C. Frémont

4th Secretary of Arizona Territory
- In office July 8, 1876 – May 30, 1877
- Nominated by: Rutherford B. Hayes
- Preceded by: Coles Bashford
- Succeeded by: John J. Gosper

Speaker of the Michigan House of Representatives
- In office January 6, 1876 – 1876
- Preceded by: Charles Croswell
- Succeeded by: Newcomb Clark

Member of the Michigan House of Representatives from the Tuscola County district
- In office January 1, 1873 – 1876

Personal details
- Born: October 6, 1841 Austinburg, Ohio, U.S.
- Died: August 27, 1926 (aged 84) Seattle, Washington, U.S.
- Party: Republican
- Spouse: Lettie J. Lewis
- Profession: Attorney

John Philo Hoyt (October 6, 1841 – August 27, 1926) was an American politician and jurist. He served as the fourth Governor of Arizona Territory and was nominated to become Governor of Idaho Territory but declined the position. In his later life he served as President of Washington's constitutional convention and as a justice of the Washington Supreme Court.

== Background ==
Hoyt was born on October 6, 1841, to David and Susan (Fancher) Hoyt in Austinburg Township, Ohio. He was educated in public schools and at the Grand River Institute. Upon completing his education, Hoyt worked as a teacher until the outbreak of the American Civil War.

On May 27, 1862, Hoyt enlisted as a private in the 87th Ohio Infantry. After one month of service, he was made a commissary sergeant, and then he and his regiment were captured by Confederate forces at the Battle of Harpers Ferry. Hoyt was mustered out on October 3, 1862, and he reenlisted as a commissary sergeant in the 2nd Ohio Heavy Artillery. Later commissioned as a second lieutenant in the 2nd Ohio Light Artillery and on January 15, 1866, was mustered out as the rank of captain. After the war he was a member of the Grand Army of the Republic.

Hoyt married Lettie J. Lewis of Adams, New York, on December 27, 1869. The couple had one daughter, June, and two sons, Harold and Arthur.

== Early political career ==
Upon his return to civilian life, Hoyt began studying law at a law firm in Jefferson, Ohio, before enrolling at the Ohio State & Union Law School in Cleveland, Ohio. He graduated in July 1867 and moved to Vassar, Michigan. In 1868 and 1870, Hoyt was elected a prosecuting attorney for Tuscola County, Michigan. This was followed by election to the Michigan House of Representatives in 1872 and 1874, where he served as Speaker of the House in 1875.

== Arizona Territory ==
President Ulysses S. Grant nominated Hoyt to be Secretary of Arizona Territory on May 22, 1876. The new Secretary arrived in the territorial capital of Tucson on July 8, 1876, and was sworn in the same day. While in his new position, he continued to practice law, being admitted to the Arizona bar on November 13, 1876, and admitted to practice law in the Territorial Supreme Court on January 3, 1877. His primary accomplishment as Secretary was compiling a new legal code for the 9th Arizona Territorial Legislature. This legal code, the "Hoyt Code", expanded the earlier "Howell Code" while retaining the same structure of the earlier work.

Hoyt was commissioned to replace the retiring Anson P.K. Safford as governor on April 5, 1877. Due to several lawsuits at the time naming Hoyt in his official capacity as Secretary, he asked to defer his assumption of the governor's office until a replacement could take his former position and represent Arizona Territory. The incoming Secretary, John J. Gosper, arrived on May 30, 1877, and Hoyt was sworn in as governor the same day. Hoyt suspended his practice of law due to a decision by Secretary of the Interior Carl Schurz that he should not practice while serving as governor.

Upon his ascension to the governorship, Hoyt had two major rivalries to deal with. He was able to help heal a bitter relationship between the territory's civilian and military leadership that had developed under Governor Safford, with General Irvin McDowell commending Hoyt on his attitude. He had less success addressing the rivalry between the northern and southern portions of the territory, but was seen as a neutral party unaffiliated with either part of the territory. Hoyt's term saw the opening of the Bisbee and Tombstone mining districts, construction of a dependable civilian telegraph system, and the connection of Yuma to California by the eastward building Southern Pacific Railroad.

Despite the citizens of Arizona being generally happy with his performance as governor, Hoyt learned on June 12, 1878, that he had been replaced by John C. Frémont. The outgoing governor initially wished to leave the territory but was convinced to remain on the job until the arrival of his replacement.

== Idaho Territory ==
Following the appointment of Frémont as Governor of Arizona, Hoyt was offered the governorship of Idaho Territory. He declined the nomination because he felt that Governor Mason Brayman was being improperly replaced. Hoyt was also worried that the manner of his appointment and Senate confirmation would prejudice the citizens of Idaho Territory against him to the point that he could not effectively serve. Hoyt instead wrote to Interior Secretary Shurz requesting a different assignment. When a comparable position did not present itself, Hoyt temporarily left federal service.

== Washington ==
After leaving office in Arizona, Hoyt traveled to Washington, D.C., and requested an appointment as a territorial chief justice. In January 1879, he was appointed Associate Justice of the Supreme Court of Washington Territory, a position Hoyt held until 1887. In May 1887, he became manager of the territory's largest bank, and in 1889, he was President of Washington's constitutional convention.

Following Washington's statehood, Hoyt was elected a justice of the Washington Supreme Court from 1889 until 1897. From 1898 to 1902, he was a regent for the University of Washington and a law professor at the school from 1902 to 1907. Hoyt died in Seattle, Washington, on August 27, 1926, and his ashes were interred in his family plot at Evergreen Washelli Memorial Park.

== Bibliography ==
- Goff, John S. (1978). Arizona Territorial Officials Volume II: The Governors 1863–1912. Cave Creek, Arizona: Black Mountain Press. OCLC 5100411.
- Wagoner, Jay J. (1970). Arizona Territory 1863–1912: A Political history. Tucson: University of Arizona Press. ISBN 0-8165-0176-9.

Political offices
Preceded by Newly established court	Justice of the Washington Supreme Court; 1889–1897	Succeeded by James Bradley Reavis
Preceded by Anson P.K. Safford	Governors of Arizona Territory; 1877–1878	Succeeded by John C. Fremont
Preceded by Coles Bashford	Secretary of Arizona Territory; 1875–1882	Succeeded by John J. Gosper
