= Safford House =

Historic house in Florida, United States

- U.S. National Register of Historic Places
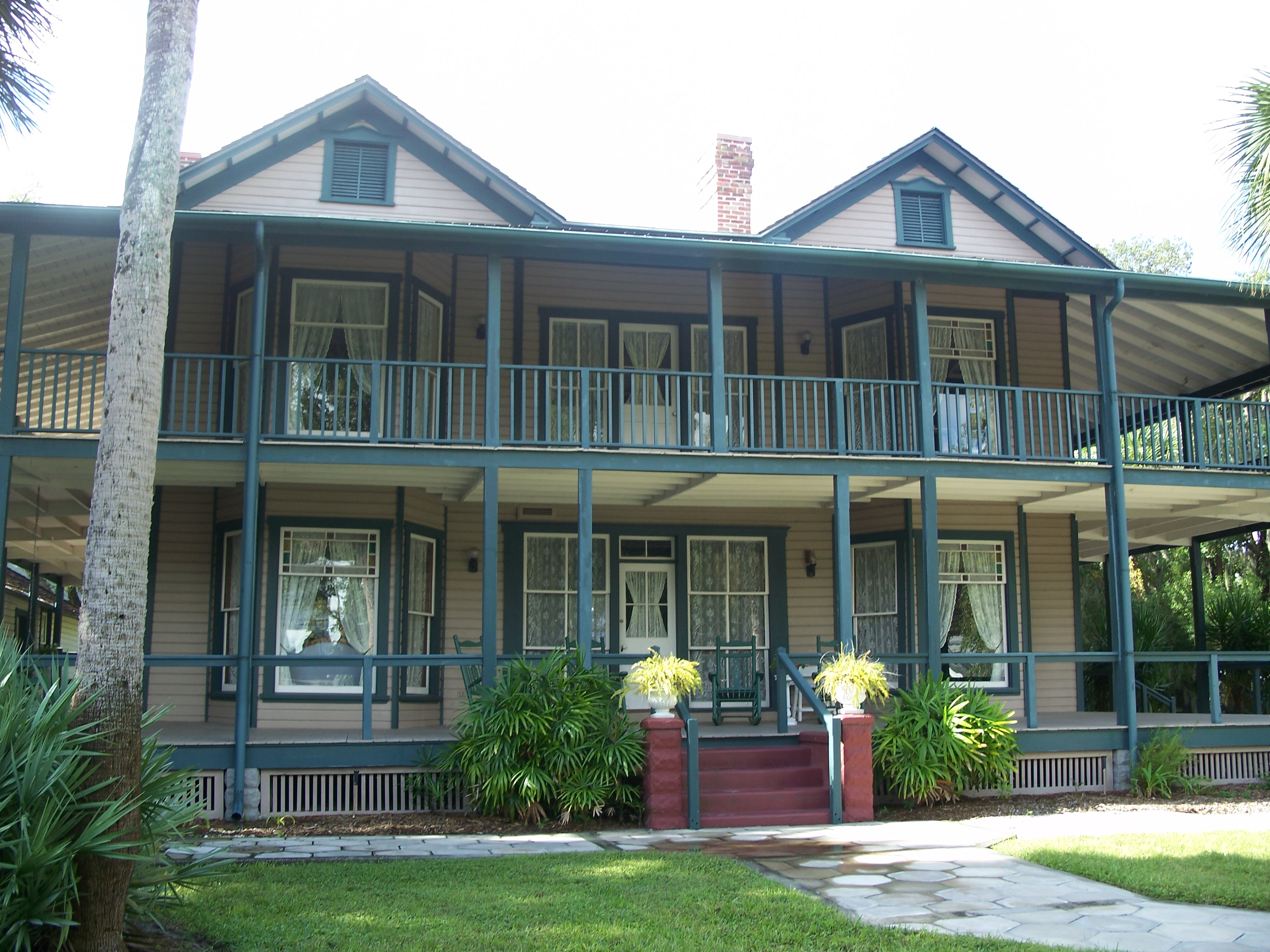

- Location within Florida Location within the United States
- Interactive map showing the location of Safford House
- Location: 23 Parkin Court, Tarpon Springs, Florida
- Coordinates: 28°8′53″N 82°45′36″W
- Built: 1883
- Architectural style: Late Victorian
- NRHP reference No.: 74000654
- Added to NRHP: October 16, 1974

The Safford House is a historic home in Tarpon Springs, Florida. On October 16, 1974, it was added to the U.S. National Register of Historic Places. The house is named for its original owner, Anson P.K. Safford.

The city of Tarpon Springs owns and operates the Safford House Museum as a late 19th-century Victorian historic house museum.
