= William Mansfield Buffum =

American politician (1832–1905)

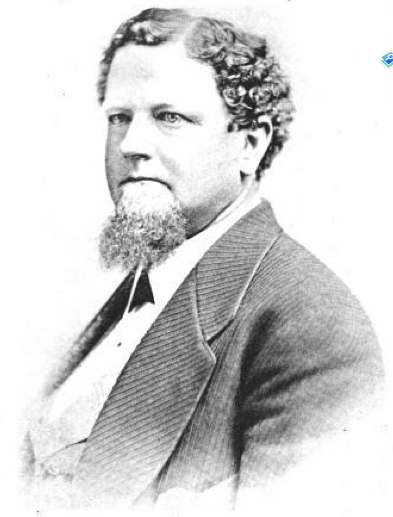
William Mansfield Buffum

William Mansfield Buffum (May 10, 1832 – June 12, 1905) was a California and Arizona merchant, investor, and politician.

== Early years and family ==
Buffum was born at Salem, Massachusetts, May 10, 1832, the son of James Rice and Susan (Mansfield) Buffum. Buffum received his early education in the public schools at Salem. There he remained until he was fifteen years of age. Buffum's father was engaged in the publishing business in Salem. His personal friend and colleague was Nathaniel Hawthorne.

== Career ==
In 1850, Buffum's brother George was appointed postmaster of Stockton, California, by President Zachary Taylor. Stockton at that time was one of the centers of the gold mining country. Soon after his appointment, George sent for his brother to assist him in the post office and in May, 1850, Buffum took passage at New York City for San Francisco, traveling by way of the Isthmus of Panama. Reaching California, he immediately proceeded to Stockton, where he assisted his brother in the introduction of the postal system. With thousands flocking to the gold fields, and the mail transportation methods relying entirely upon the Pony Express and the long route from the East by water, the difficulties that beset the Buffum brothers were so manifold as to divert from the mind of the two all thought of hunting for the gold that everyone had gone to California to seek. In a short time, however, the gold fever finally entered the veins of young Buffum and he joined a party in a prospecting trip to Calaveras. There, he engaged for a time in mining, but failed to find gold.

In 1859, Buffum removed to Los Angeles, where he became agent for the most important distilling concern in the West. In 1871, when the Territory of Arizona was first opened, Buffum was one of the first to enter business in that territory as a merchant. Although he remained in Los Angeles for several years thereafter, he formed a partnership with John G. Campbell, under the firm name of Campbell and Buffum. This firm grew to be the most important merchandising concern in the territory, and both its members played important parts in the formative history of the territory.

At the time Buffum went to Arizona, General George Crook was governor of the military post at Prescott, and here the firm opened its store. In 1873, Buffum went to Prescott to join his partner in the business, which had by that time assumed large proportions. In Prescott, Buffum became one of the important men of the region, acquiring a reputation for stability and honor. As a public-spirited citizen, he took a leading part in the affairs of the city and territory. He associated with Eli P. Clark and Gen. Moses Sherman, the builders of the Pasadena and Los Angeles transit systems. Buffum was a member of the early days Arizona Territorial Legislature. His colleague there was Thomas Fitch. Later, Buffum became a member of the Board of School Trustees of Prescott and was its head when Sherman was invited there to inaugurate the school system. In 1877, he was appointed by General Fremont as a member of the State's Prison Commission, and as such rendered valuable aid in checking the graft that had found its way into the politics of the State. Buffum remained engaged in business in Prescott until the early 1880s. During his career there, he was one of the first men interested in the Arizona Verde mines, which later became one of the most notable copper properties in the world. With Governor Frederick Augustus Tritle of Arizona, he owned this mine for several years.

In 1889, Buffum gave up his business in Arizona and returned to Los Angeles, where he became associated with Sherman and Clark, who were then engaged in financing and promoting the street railway systems in Pasadena and Los Angeles. He was made cashier of the Los Angeles Pacific Railroad company, sharing the difficult tasks that met these projects in their organic state. As cashier and collector for the promoters, he handled large sums of money. For twenty years, he remained with Clark and Sherman, at the same time engaging in the realty business and in general investments on his personal account. At various times, he was the owner of some of the largest and most important realty parcels in the business district of Los Angeles. When the old Temple estate was subdivided he was one of the largest purchasers, investing heavily in property that later become priceless and that has netted immense profits to a line of subsequent purchasers. He was one of the most optimistic believers in the future of Los Angeles. The block where now stands Coulter's Dry Goods Store (at 5600 Wilshire Blvd.) was once owned by him. He at different times also owned the corner of Franklin and New High streets, the corner of Broadway and Spring, and the block on Twelfth Street between Hill and Olive streets, Los Angeles. At Jefferson and Main streets, he owned 40 acres of land.

== Personal life ==
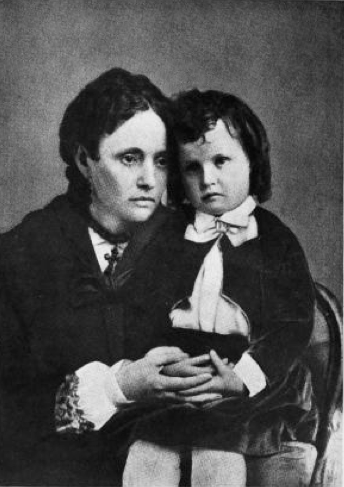
Rebecca Evans Buffum and Asa Mansfield Buffum

He married Rebecca Evans of Smithfield, Fayette County, Pennsylvania, in 1864, at Los Angeles, California. They had two sons, Asa Mansfield Buffum, and one son who died in infancy. Rebecca was a descendant of the Brownfields of Pennsylvania, to whom King George III granted a vast estate in that State, afterwards known as George's Township. Buffum throughout his life had been a prominent member of the Royal Arch Chapter of Masonry and of the California Society. He died June 12, 1905, and was buried by the Masonic Order. He was survived by his widow, Rebecca Evans Buffum.

== Bibliography ==
- Press Reference Library (1915). Being the Portraits and Biographies of the Progressive Men of the West (Public domain ed.). International News Service.
