= Anson P. K. Safford =

American politician (1830–1891)

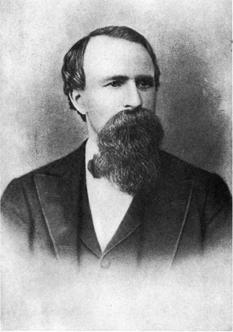

3rd Governor of Arizona Territory
- In office July 9, 1869 – April 5, 1877
- Nominated by: Ulysses S. Grant
- Preceded by: Richard C. McCormick
- Succeeded by: John Philo Hoyt

Member of the California State Assembly from the 17th district
- In office 1857–1859

Personal details
- Born: February 14, 1830 Hyde Park, Vermont, U.S.
- Died: December 15, 1891 (aged 61) Tarpon Springs, Florida, U.S.
- Party: Republican
- Spouse(s): Jenny L. Tracy (1869–1873); Margarita Grijalva (1878–1880); Soledad Bonillas (1881–)

Anson Pacely Killen Safford (Note: Various sources give multiple variations for the spelling of Safford's two middle names. Among these are Peasley, Peacely, Keeler, and Killen.) (c. February 14, 1830 – December 15, 1891) was the third Governor of Arizona Territory. He was also a member of the California State Assembly from 1857–1858. Affectionately known as the "Little Governor" due to his 5-foot-6-inch (1.68 m) stature, he was also Arizona's longest-serving territorial governor. His work to create a public education system earned him the name "Father of the Arizona Public Schools". Safford is additionally known for granting himself a divorce.

== Background ==
Safford was born to Joseph Warren and Diantha P. (Little) Safford in Hyde Park, Vermont, on February 14 of either 1828 or 1830. (Note: Safford's autobiography lists his year of birth as 1828, while other period sources list 1830.) When he was eight, his family moved to Crete, Illinois, where they farmed. Safford was largely self-educated, attending only five quarters at a county school followed later by six months at a different school. His father died in 1848 and his mother in 1849. Safford left the family farm in March 1850 as part of the California Gold Rush.

After his arrival in California, Safford began working a claim in Placer County that produced from five to twenty dollars per day. His leisure time was spent reading from a set of books he had purchased to further his education. In 1854 he moved to a new claim and in 1855 was a Democratic party nominee for a seat in the California State Assembly, losing his race to a Know Nothing candidate. Safford won a seat as an assemblyman in 1857 and was reelected in 1859.

Following his time in the state legislature, Safford moved to San Francisco where he operated an earthworks business. When the American Civil War broke out, he changed his political affiliation to the Union Party and later became a Republican. Safford moved to Nevada in early 1862 and was elected county commissioner for Humboldt County in November 1862. After a month in office, he resigned as commissioner and later served as a mining recorder and county recorder. Safford was secretary of the Nevada constitutional convention in November 1863 and president of Nevada's first Republican state convention. To add to his cultural experience, Safford took a two-year trip to Europe and then returned to Nevada. He turned down a nomination to the US House of Representatives before being appointed surveyor-general of Nevada by President Andrew Johnson in March 1867. Safford served as surveyor-general for two years before health issues forced him to resign.

Safford married Jenny (or Jennie) L. Tracy in Tucson, Arizona, on July 24, 1869. The couple had a son who was born July 2, 1870, and died August 28, 1871. The couple quickly became estranged and their dispute escalated to the point where Jenny Safford had notices printed claiming her husband had engaged in infidelity and was suffering from a venereal disease. This marriage ended when Arizona's territorial legislature passed a bill granting a divorce to the couple. Governor Safford signing the bill into law in January 1873 and his ex-wife remarried on February 24, 1873. Safford's second marriage was to Margarita Grijalva on December 12, 1878. The couple had one daughter before Margarita Safford died in New York City on January 7, 1880. Safford's third marriage was to Soledad Bonillas, sister of Ignacio Bonillas, on September 10, 1881. During his life, Safford adopted two children.

== Governorship ==
On March 13, 1869, the Nevada Congressional delegation of Thomas Fitch, James W. Nye, and William M. Stewart petitioned President Ulysses S. Grant to nominate Safford as Governor of Arizona Territory. This nomination was supported by Arizona's Coles Bashford, John N. Goodwin, and Richard C. McCormick along with political figures from California. Safford was nominated on April 3, 1869, commissioned April 9, 1869, and sworn into office on July 9, 1869. His second term began in April 1873 and he declined a third term.

The Safford administration immediately faced the problem of hostile Indians. To counter this threat he called for the creation of volunteer militia and worked with Territorial Delegate McCormick to have General George Stoneman replaced by George Crook in June 1871. Safford was also forced to assign a military force to guard the road between Gila Bend and Fort Yuma from Mexican outlaws. Other efforts to combat lawlessness included the governor petitioning the territorial legislature to make highway robbery a capital offense and the building of a territorial prison. As a result of these efforts Indian hostilities were largely eliminated, with only occasional outbreaks, and enough order was instilled into the territory to allow for ranching activities to move to Arizona.

Safford's passion while in office was the creation of a public school system. This effort was initially opposed by the legislature, but the governor was able to win passage of a new property tax on February 17, 1871, to finance creation and operation of schools. As ex officio superintendent of public instruction, the governor corresponded with educators across the nation and even used his personal funds to help build schools or bring new teachers to Arizona. Arizona's first public school opened during March 1872 in Tucson. The one room adobe structure had a single teacher and, at its peak, 138 students. Other schools were built throughout the territory over the next few years. During his address to the territorial legislature in January 1877, Safford was pleased to report that at least 1450 of the 2955 children counted in the May 1876 census could read and write.

== After office ==
After leaving office Safford opened one of Arizona's first banks, with offices in Tucson and Tombstone. He was admitted to the bar in January 1875 but did not work as an attorney. Instead, with the assistance of his friend, John S. Vosburg, helped finance several mines. When the first claims were filed in Tombstone, the initial settlement of tents and cabins was located at Watervale near the Lucky Cuss mine. Safford offered financial backing for a cut of the Lucky Cuss mining claim, and Ed Schieffelin, his brother Al, and their partner Richard Gird formed the Tombstone Mining and Milling Company and with Safford's backing built the first stamping mill. When the mill was built, the town site was moved to Goose Flats, a mesa above the Toughnut 4,539 feet (1,383 m) above sea level and large enough to hold a growing town.

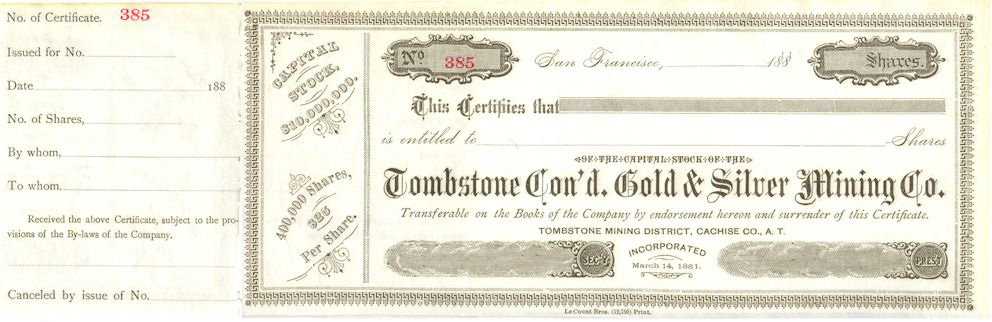
Stock certificate of the Consolidated Tombstone Gold and Silver Mining Company

In early March 1881, the Tombstone Mining and Milling Company was sold to capitalists from Philadelphia, and Safford became president of the new Tombstone Gold and Silver Milling and Mining Company with Richard Gird was superintendent. Ed and Al Schieffelin soon sold their one-third ownership in the Tough Nut for $1 million and moved on, although Al remained in Tombstone for sometime longer. Gird later sold off his one-third interest for $1 million, doubling what the Schieffelins had been paid. In 1880, Safford was a delegate to the Republican National Convention.

In the early 1880s, Safford sold his business interests for roughly $140,000 and moved to Philadelphia and then New York City. By 1882 Safford had moved to Florida and become involved with building the new community of Tarpon Springs. He was a candidate for Arizona Territorial Governor again in 1889, with support coming from Matthew Quay, Leland Stanford, and William M. Stewart, but was not nominated. Safford's later years were spent in Florida with his family and sister, Mary Jane Safford-Blake. He died on December 15, 1891, in Tarpon Springs and was buried at Cycadia Cemetery. Safford House, his 1883 Tarpon Springs home, is currently a museum. It was added to the U.S. National Register of Historic Places on October 16, 1974. The city of Safford, Arizona is named in his honor, as are streets in Safford and Tarpon Springs.

== See also ==
- Safford, Arizona
- Safford House
- Safford Ave, Tarpon Springs, FL

== Bibliography ==
- Goff, John S. (1978). Arizona Territorial Officials Volume II: The Governors 1863–1912. Cave Creek, Arizona: Black Mountain Press. OCLC 5100411.
- Wagoner, Jay J. (1970). Arizona Territory 1863–1912: A Political history. Tucson: University of Arizona Press. ISBN 0-8165-0176-9.

Political offices
Preceded by Richard C. McCormick	Governor of Arizona Territory; 1869–1877	Succeeded by John Philo Hoyt
