= Andrew J. Doran =

American politician (1840–1918)

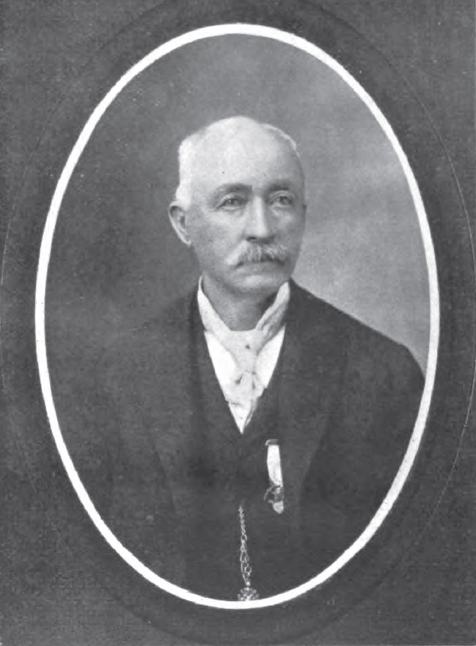
Andrew J. Doran

Andrew James Doran (July 11, 1840 – February 15, 1918) was an American politician, miner, and specialty carpenter. After leaving home, he moved to California where, following the start of the American Civil War, he joined the California Column. After leaving the military he worked as a bridge builder for the Central Pacific Railroad. Doran moved to Arizona Territory in 1876 and became superintendent for the Silver King Mine. Politically, Doran was elected to the Arizona Territorial Legislature six times and was selected to be President of the Council twice. His later years were spent as superintendent for the Arizona Pioneers' Home.

== Biography ==
Doran was born in New Philadelphia, Ohio, on July 11, 1840, to George and Jane (Cribbs) Doran and raised primarily by his grandparents. He moved to Boonville, Missouri, in 1843 and Mount Pleasant, Iowa, in 1847. From there, he lived in Des Moines, Iowa, for a short time before settling in Boone County, Iowa. Doran was educated in public schools and at Iowa Wesleyan College. Leaving home in 1860, Doran went to Central City, Colorado. There he worked as a delivery clerk and miner. The next year he continued on to Marysville, California, via Tucson, New Mexico Territory. Upon his arrival, he worked as carpenter, bridge builder, and millwright.

With the outbreak of the American Civil War, Doran enlisted in the 5th Regiment California Volunteer Infantry. Serving as part of the California Column, he was granted a brevet commission due to his prior experience crossing the desert on the Butterfield route. Doran was discharged from the military in 1864 and returned briefly to California before moving to Canyon City, Oregon. There he worked as a superintendent for the Humboldt Mill and Ditch Company until 1867. In 1868, Doran secured a bridge building contract with the Central Pacific Railroad. As a result of his work for the railroads, he was present for the First transcontinental railroad's "Last Spike" ceremony in 1869. Following his work for the railroads, he constructed a mill in Inyo County, California.

Doran moved to Arizona Territory in 1876. There he constructed mills for mines in Pinal County In 1881 he oversaw construction of a reduction mill at the Silver King Mine. Upon completion of the work, Doran was hired as the mine's superintendent. Under his leadership, the Silver King produced record levels of silver. As a result, Doran's expertise was sought by other mine operators in the territory. In addition to his mining efforts, Doran worked as a real estate agent.

Entering politics in 1881, Doran represented Pinal County in the House of Representatives (lower house) during 11th Arizona Territorial Legislature. The next year he was elected Pinal County sheriff. He was returned to the House during the 1887 session. From 1889 till 1893, Doran served two terms on the territorial board of equalization (tax administration). During the 1891 and 1893 legislative sessions, Doran represented Pinal County in the Council (upper house). Governor John N. Irwin appointed him Lieutenant colonel of the 1st Regiment, Arizona National Guard, a position Doran held for seven years. For the 18th Arizona Territorial Legislature, Doran was elected to the Council's at-large seat and selected to be President of the Council.

Moving to Prescott in 1895, Doran partnered with former Mississippi Governor Ridgley C. Powers to form a real estate business. In 1896, he was the Republican nominee to become Territorial Delegate to the United States Congress but lost the general election to Marcus A. Smith. Doran was a commissioner for Arizona's delegation to the 1893 World's Columbian Exposition. For the 1904 St. Louis World's Fair, he served as President of the Board of Managers for Arizona's presentation. In 1907, Doran represented Yavapai County in Council during 24th Arizona Territorial Legislature. He also served as President of the Council during the session. The session resulted in two important proposals by Doran. The first was a compromise bill that addressed concerns about fairly appraising the value of mining operations for tax purposes. The second was a proposal to create the Arizona Pioneers' Home. Doran's proposal to create the house was defeated in the 24th legislature but passed by the next session. Governor Joseph Henry Kibbey appointed Doran to be the home's first superintendent, a position he held until his resignation in July 1912.

Socially, Doran was a member of the Benevolent and Protective Order of Elks and a 32nd degree mason. Following an automobile accident in Los Angeles, California, he began suffering health problems that included partial paralysis. Doran died from a cerebral hemorrhage on February 15, 1918. He was buried in Prescott's Pioneer Home Cemetery.

== Sources ==
- Conners, Jo, ed. (1913). Who's who in Arizona. Vol. I. Tucson. OCLC 8862523.
- Goff, John S. (1996). Arizona Territorial Officials Volume VI: Members of the Legislature A–L. Cave Creek, Arizona: Black Mountain Press. OCLC 36714908.
- Wagoner, Jay J. (1970). Arizona Territory 1863–1912: A Political history. Tucson: University of Arizona Press. ISBN 0-8165-0176-9.
