= 18th Arizona Territorial Legislature =

Session of the Arizona Territorial Legislature (1895)

←	17th	19th	→

Overview
- Legislative body: Arizona Territorial Legislature
- Jurisdiction: Arizona Territory, United States

Council
- Members: 12
- President: Andrew J. Doran

House of Representatives
- Members: 24
- Speaker: J. H. Carpenter

The 18th Arizona Territorial Legislative Assembly was a session of the Arizona Territorial Legislature which met in Phoenix, Arizona. The session ran from January 21 to March 21, 1895. Due to the abrupt manner in which the session ended, none of the usual appropriations bills were passed by the legislature.

== Background ==
Governor L. C. Hughes had taken office shortly before the close of the previous session. The governor's time in office since then had been tumultuous with many influential territorial members of his own political party calling for his removal from office.

A separate issue dealt with the location of the territorial prison. While sentiment at the time called for the prison to be moved from Yuma to Prescott, House Speaker J. H. Carpenter, representing Yuma County, Arizona, wanted the prison to remain in his district.

== Legislative session ==
The session began on January 21, 1895, and ran for sixty days.

=== Governor's address ===
Governor L. C. Hughes gave his address to a joint meeting of both houses of the legislature on January 22, 1895. His primary areas of concern were education, economic development, taxation, and improving the territory's moral climate.

In the area of education, the governor announced the territory had over 11,000 students enrolled in public schools being taught by 288 teachers. The University of Arizona in turn had expanded its educational services while simultaneously reducing its operating expenses by US$6,500. Hughes wished to reduce the territory's high property tax rates, but to do so required the long-standing issue of undervalued appraisals to be addressed. Toward this end he recommended all property be listed at its full value on the tax rolls and that all tax exemptions be removed. To aid economic development, the governor asked for creation of several new positions. The included territorial architect, commissioner of agriculture, territorial irrigation engineer, and quarantine and health officers along with a board of immigration to encourage new settlers to move to the territory.

Hughes wished to reduce governmental operating costs and asked for all extraneous government positions to be terminated. To this end he recommended combining control of the territorial insane asylum, prison, and other related institutions into a single oversight board instead of maintaining separate board of directors for each institution. Explicitly exempted from this recommendation were the boards of regents for the University of Arizona and territorial normal schools.

Dealing with moral concerns, Hughes asked for the sale of lottery tickets to be prohibited and provisions be made for the care of the blind, deaf, and mentally impaired individuals. He also sought to compel territorial officers to enforce territorial laws dealing the sale of alcohol to minors, notorious cohabitation, and houses of prostitution. This was on top of concerns about Sabbath laws, promoting rest on Sundays and passed by the 16th Arizona Territorial Legislature, being openly ignored by most territorial residents. Finally Hughes was troubled with the "purity of elections", saying "In this connection I call attention to the pernicious practice which requires candidates for office to treat and drink with voters, and deposit money in saloons for 'free drinks' which is no less a bribe to the saloon keepers and the electors for political support. The custom is demoralizing and debauching to all concerned, and prevents many good citizens from becoming candidates for important elective offices."

=== Legislation ===
The legislature acted upon a number of the Governor's requests. A new election law banned any candidate for office from asking another person to consume beer or other spirituous liquors. Counties were instructed to provide food, lodging, and medical assistance to indigent persons. The most influential act came when the legislature combined the functions of oversight boards for territorial prison, reform school and insane asylum into a Board of Territorial Control. A county level office of commissioner of agriculture was also created.

In other actions, the Governor was authorized to grant paroles. All school districts with at least 2,000 residents were authorized to create a high school. As a defense preparedness action, the legislature authorized creation of a military styled "American Guard" to be composed of students in territorial public schools. The guard was open to any boy age eleven or older. The session also authorized a US$5,000 reward to Governor Lewis Wolfley for his previous work to restructure the territorial debt in a manner that generated a US$59,006/year reduction in interest payments. The measure was passed over a veto by Governor Hughes.

The final act of the session was creation of Navajo County from western Apache County. Holbrook was selected as the county seat. While there was no serious opposition to creation of the new county the prolonged discussion over the new county had the effect of blocking a motion to move the territorial prison from Yuma to Prescott from being debated in the House of Representatives. Shortly after bill to create Navajo County was passed, as the clock struck midnight on the sixtieth day of the session, Speaker J. H. Carpenter declared the House adjourned sine die. This was done even though prior sessions, when faced with a similar situation, had established the practice of either stopping the clock or turning the hands back to give the legislators extra time to finish their business. This prevented discussion on moving the territorial prison from occurring but, as a consequence of this action, the normal appropriation bills were not passed.

== Aftermath ==
The law creating a commissioner of agriculture in each county specified that the officer holder was to be nominated by the Territorial Governor but the position's $50/month salary was to be paid from county funds. Many county Board of Supervisors refused to pay this sum, especially after Governor Hughes chose newspapermen who were useful political allies for the governor but lacked much knowledge of agriculture. A lawsuit over the issue eventually determined the new office was legally created but did little good for Hughes as the ruling came shortly before he was removed from office.

The abrupt adjournment of the House of Representatives resulted in the session passing no appropriation bills. For the next two years territorial auditors paid accounts without explicit legal authority. Despite the probable illegality of these actions, no serious questions were made into the payments and the auditors were not disciplined.

== Members ==
House of Representatives
Name	County	Name	County
Thomas E. Baker	Pinal	H. C. Herrick	Cochise
Will C. Barnes	Apache	A. E. Hinton	Maricopa
M. W. Bernard	Pima	G. W. Hull	Yavapai
Thomas H. Brown	Yavapai	George W. P. Hunt	Gila
J. H. Carpenter (Speaker)	Yuma	J. A. Marshall	Maricopa
H. K. Chenoweth	Pima	J. C. Martin	Yavapai
George H. Crosby	Apache	M. R. Moore	Pinal
Charles L. Cummings	Cochise	Niels Petersen	Maricopa
James Finley	Pima	Mariano G. Samaniego	Pima
Joseph Fish	Graham	George W. Skinner	Graham
O. D. M. Gaddis	Mohave	Perry Wildman	Maricopa
E. F. Greenlaw	Coconino	Austin C. Wright	Cochise

Council
Name	County
F. T. Aspinwall	Apache
E. J. Babbitt	Coconino
Thomas Davis	Pinal
Andrew J. Doran (President)	At Large
Burt Dunlap	Graham
E. J. Edwards	Gila
John S. Jones	Yavapai
Henry E. Kemp	Maricopa
William H. Lake	Mohave
M. J. Nugent	Yuma
B. A. Packard	Cochise
J. B. Scott	Pima

- At Large Council member chosen by entire territory
