= Senator Breen =

Senator Breen may refer to:

- Cathy Breen (born 1965), Maine State Senate
- Fred Sylvester Breen (1869–1932), Arizona State Senate
