= 25th Arizona Territorial Legislature =

Session of the Arizona Territorial Legislature (1909)

←	24th	Constitution of Arizona	→

Overview
- Legislative body: Arizona Territorial Legislature
- Jurisdiction: Arizona Territory, United States

Council
- Members: 12
- President: George W. P. Hunt

House of Representatives
- Members: 24
- Speaker: Samuel F. Webb

The 25th Arizona Territorial Legislative Assembly was the final session of the Arizona Territorial Legislature. The session convened in Phoenix, Arizona, and ran from January 18 till March 18, 1909. Its actions include the creation of Greenlee County, establishing the Arizona Pioneers' Home, and requiring primary elections.

== Background ==
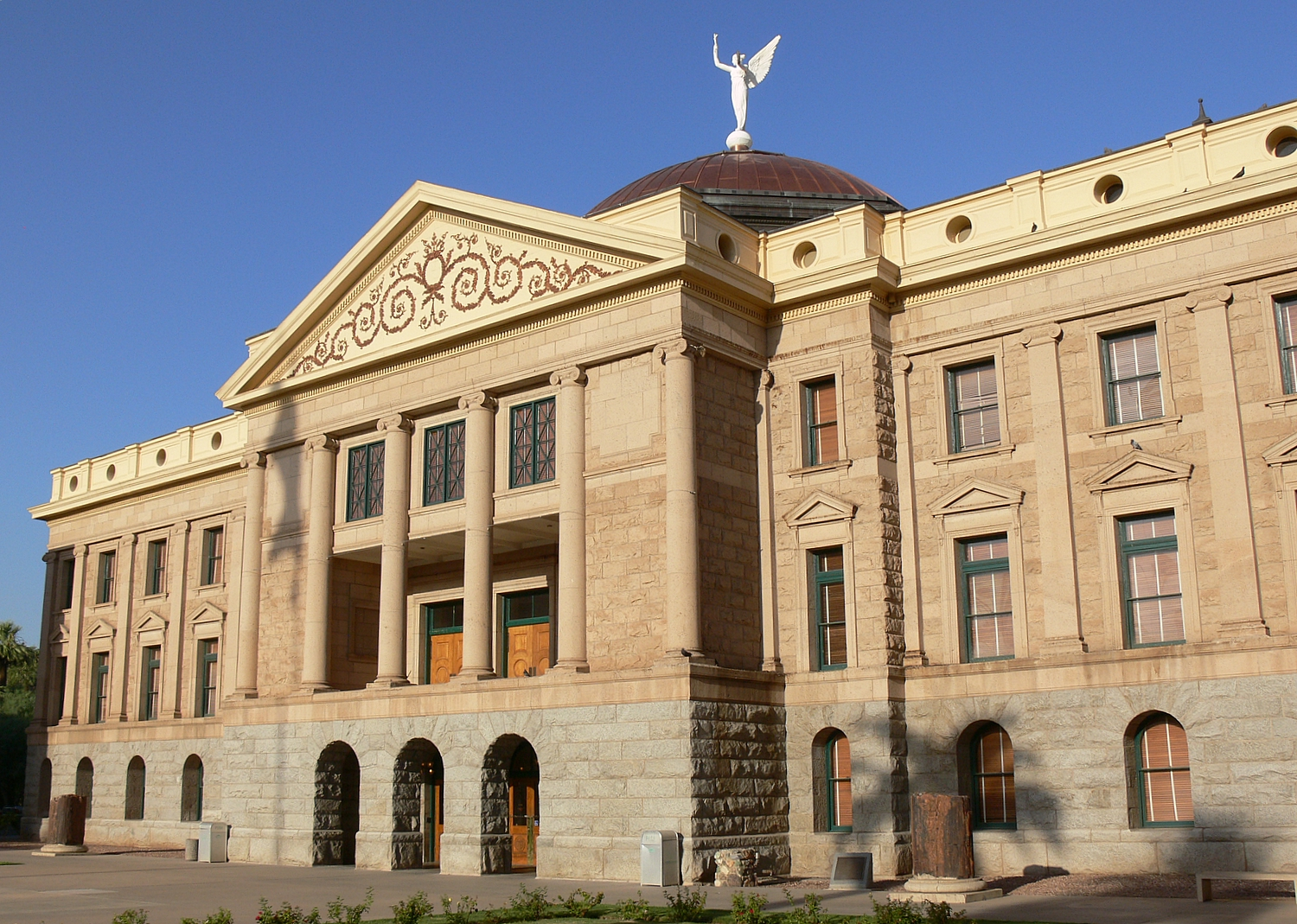
View of the original Arizona State Capitol building

Arizona was still seeking statehood. After years of electing a Democrat as the territorial delegate to the U.S. Congress, feelings in the territory were that a Republican could have better results achieving statehood in a Republican controlled Congress. This sentiment helped Ralph H. Cameron defeat long term territorial Delegate Mark Smith.

President Theodore Roosevelt renominated Governor Joseph Henry Kibbey for a second term on December 16, 1908. Mining interests and other political opponents delayed confirmation until after Roosevelt left office. When President William Howard Taft took office, he decided to appoint Richard Elihu Sloan and as a result Kibbey left office on May 1, 1909.

== Legislative session ==
The session ran from January 18 till March 18, 1909. It passed 107 bills into law.

=== Governor's address ===
Governor Kibbey gave his address to the session during the afternoon of January 19, 1909. The lengthy speech dealt with generalities and descriptive principles but gave few specific recommendations. The governor was pleased with the financial position and economic development of the territory and its roughly 200,000 residents. While he deferred asking for additional reforms in the area of mine taxation till a state legislature could be convened, Kibbey asked for establishment of a territorial railroad commission to work with the Interstate Commerce Commission. Additionally, the governor expressed his view that this would be the final session of the Arizona Territorial Legislature.

=== Legislation ===
The 25th legislature proved to be highly partisan with the Democratic controlled session opposing many of their Republican governor's efforts. The session overrode vetoes to bills eliminating the position of Territorial Examiner and creating a literacy test for all Arizona voters (Note: Which required reading any paragraph of the United States Constitution and signing their name – a provision aimed primarily at Mexican immigrants, a group thought to vote Republican.) Another veto override abolished the Arizona Rangers. In their place each county sheriff was authorized a limited number of "ranger deputies". The final key veto override involved a bill authorizing territorial schools to segregate "African" students.

In other business, the session created Greenlee County from eastern Graham County As part of the compromise for creating the county, the mines in the Clifton and Morenci mining districts assumed responsibility for paying off Graham County's debt. A railroad commission and the office of territorial historian were established. The office of territorial engineer was also created with responsibility for the construction and improvement of bridges and roads within Arizona. Authorization to establish the Arizona Pioneers' Home was likewise passed. The session modified territorial election laws to require use of primary elections. Finally, the legislature established February 12 as a legal holiday in honor of Abraham Lincoln's 100th birthday.

== Aftermath ==
Mulford Winsor, the person who first recommended creation of the position, was appointed territorial historian by Governor Kibbey. He retained the position till October 1909 when he was replaced by Sharlot Hall. With the coming of statehood, the Territorial Railroad Commission was succeeded by the Arizona Corporation Commission.

The legislation authorizing statehood for Arizona was signed into law on June 20, 1910. The enabling act held a provision that prevented elections after the 1908 election from being held under territorial law. This resulted in the legislative session scheduled for January 1911 being cancelled. This was done because it was assumed at the time of the act's passage that a state legislature would meet in 1911. Governor Sloan also had the authority to call the 25th legislature back into session. Instead of calling the territorial legislature back as final approval for statehood was delayed, the governor used another provision in the enabling act to levy taxes and authorize needed appropriations.

== Members ==
House of Representatives
Name	County	Name	County
Neill E. Bailey	Cochise	Phil C. Merrill	Graham
G. A. Bray	Yavapai	Kirke T. Moore	Pima
J. B. Bourne	Pinal	George D. Morris	Yavapai
T. J. Coalter	Coconino	William W. Pace	Graham
Frank DeSouza	Maricopa	Joseph Peterson	Navajo
John Doan	Pima	J. C. Reed	Maricopa
Frank J. Duffy	Santa Cruz	Oscar W. Roberts	Cochise
J. S. Gibbons	Apache	C. L. Shaw	Pinal
Perry Hall	Yavapai	Fred A. Sutter	Cochise
R. A. Hightower	Yuma	S. W. Tobey	Mohave
William J. Hogwood	Pima	Samuel F. Webb (Speaker)	Maricopa
John McCormick	Gila	James W. Woolf	Maricopa

Council
Name	County
Fred Sylvester Breen	Coconino
Michael G. Burns	Yavapai
Kean St. Charles	Mohave
S. E. Day	Apache
James B. Finley	Pima and Santa Cruz
Ben Goodrich	Cochise
John R. Hampton	Graham
George W. P. Hunt (President)	Gila
William J. Morgan	Navajo
George W. Norton	Yuma
Eugene B. O'Neill	Maricopa
Thomas F. Weedin	Pinal
