= Owen Thomas Rouse =

American jurist (1843–1919)

Associate Justice, Arizona Territorial Supreme Court
- In office May 2, 1893 – July 20, 1897
- Nominated by: Grover Cleveland
- Preceded by: Joseph Henry Kibbey
- Succeeded by: Fletcher M. Doan

Personal details
- Born: January 4, 1843 Florence, Kentucky
- Died: September 8, 1919 (aged 76) Tucson, Arizona
- Party: Democratic
- Spouse: Louise Mosley
- Profession: Attorney

Owen Thomas Rouse (January 4, 1843 – September 8, 1919) was an American jurist who served as associate justice of the Arizona Territorial Supreme Court from 1893 until 1897.

== Early life and marriage ==
Rouse was born to Joshua and Tabitha (Souther) Rouse in Florence, Kentucky, on January 4, 1843. While he was still a child, his family moved to Monroe County, Missouri. He was educated in local schools before he began reading law under a local attorney. He graduated from the Union Law School in Cleveland, Ohio, in 1867. Following graduation, Rouse practiced law in Paris, Missouri, before moving to Moberly. He was a member of the Missouri State Senate from 1880 until 1884. While in office, he served as chairman of the committee on criminal jurisprudence. Rouse married Louisa Mosley in the early 1870s. The union produced one son, Charles Oma Rouse.

== Career ==
Following the inauguration of President Grover Cleveland, Rouse requested appointment as a judge in either Utah or New Mexico Territory. He expanded his list to include Arizona Territory several months later. He was appointed Arizona's United States District Attorney on November 2, 1885. Justice William Wood Porter administered Rouse's oath of office on November 20. On May 24, 1889, following the inauguration of President Benjamin Harrison, Rouse submitted his resignation. He remained in Tucson, and established a private legal practice. Fraternally, he was a Mason and served as grand commander for the Knights Templar.

President Cleveland returned to office and nominated Rouse to become an Associate Justice of the Arizona Territorial Supreme Court on April 25, 1893. He took his oath of office on May 2, 1893. He was assigned to district two, comprising Gila, Graham, and Pinal counties. Rouse lived in Solomonville during his years on the court. When rumors circulated in 1895 and 1896 that Chief Justice Albert C. Baker planned to resign, Rouse's friends began lobbying for him to be made the new Chief Justice.

As a member of the territorial supreme court, Rouse wrote over two dozen opinions covering a wide range of topics. In Gray v. Noonan, 5 Arizona 167 (1897), he dealt with attachment of property during the execution of a judgement while In re Sydow, 4 Arizona 207 (1894) involved the licensing of shopkeepers. Arizona Lumber and Timber Company v. Mooney, 4 Arizona 366 (1895) dealt with the impact of a hierarchical employment relationship in personal injury cases. Meyers c. Culver, 4 Arizona 145 was concerned with the elections for justices of the peace. In The United States v. Chung Sing, 4 Arizona 217 (1894), Rouse set a pair of precedents. First, he found that while either party in a jury trial could request a particular item be included in a set of jury instructions, the trial judge was not required to honor all requests. Second, a trial judge could set aside a jury's verdict without being overruled by an appellate court provided the judge had evidence to support his actions. Rouse's ruling in Harwood v. Wentworth, 4 Arizona 378 (1895), held that the version of a legislative act certified by the territorial secretary was authoritative even if it differed from version in the legislative journal. This decision was later confirmed by the United States Supreme Court. In Dunbar v. Territory of Arizona, 5 Arizona 184 (1897), Rouse overturned journalist John O. Dunbar's conviction for libeling the governor and territorial secretary because the trial court had both fined and sentenced the defendant to time in a county jail instead of following the normal procedure of sending a convicted defendant to the territorial prison.

Rouse was close to completing his four-year term when his replacement was appointed. His successor took his oath of office on July 20, 1897. After leaving the bench, Rouse returned to his private legal practice in Tucson. In 1911, he was a candidate for a seat on the Arizona Supreme Court. He continued working at his legal practice until his death.

== Death ==
Rouse died on September 8, 1919, in Tucson, Arizona, after suffering a stroke. He was buried in the Masonic section of Tucson's Evergreen Cemetery.
