= William G. Blakely House =

Historic house in Arizona, United States

- William G. Blakeley House
- U.S. National Register of Historic Places
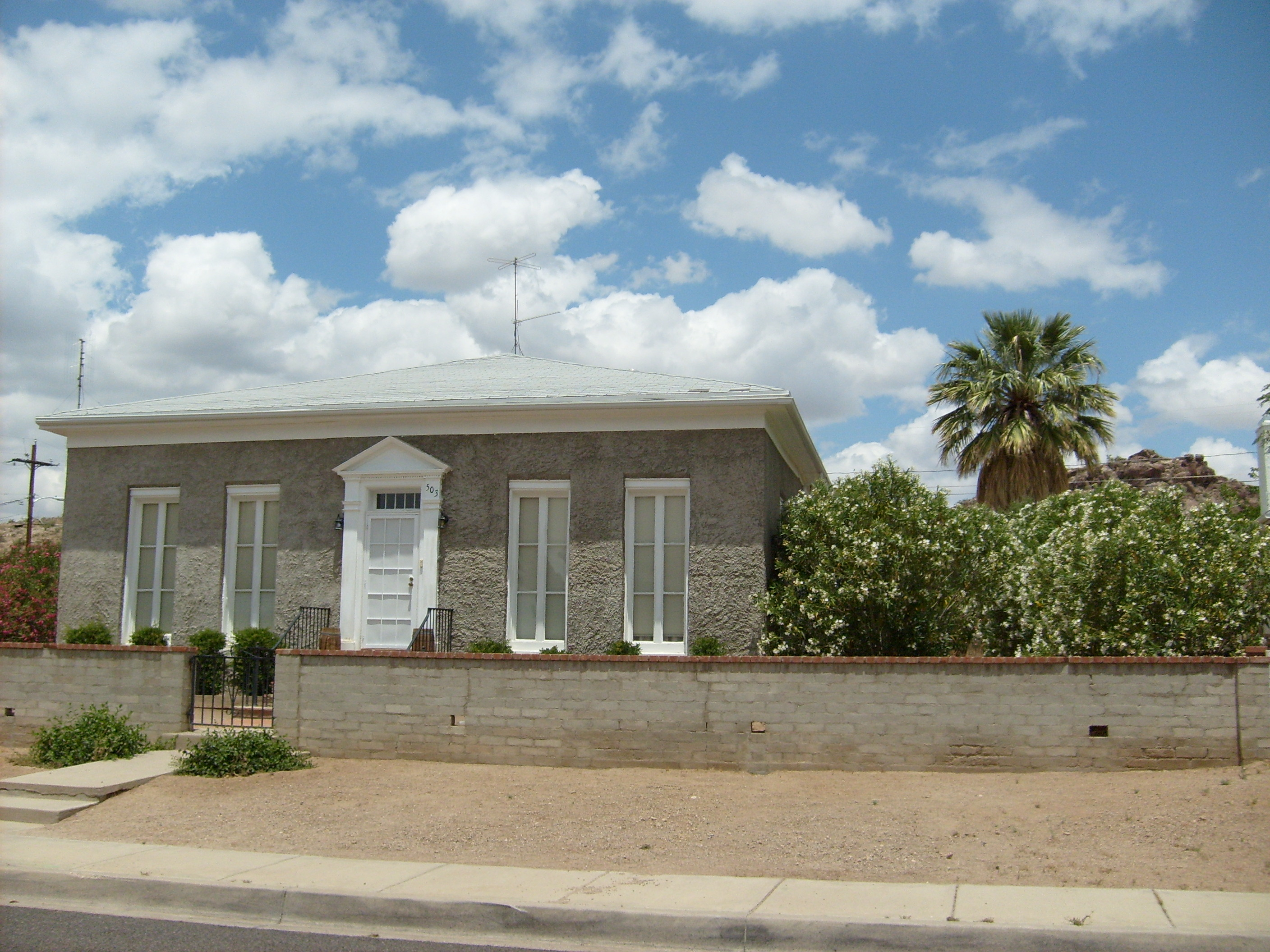

- Location within Arizona Location within the United States
- Location: 503 Spring Street, Kingman, Arizona
- Coordinates: 35°11′30″N 114°3′0″W
- Built: 1887
- Architectural style: Colonial Revival
- MPS: Kingman MRA
- NRHP reference No.: 86001115
- Added to NRHP: May 14, 1986

The William G. Blakely House is a historic house located in Kingman, Arizona. It was evaluated for National Register of Historic Places listing as part of a 1985 study of 63 historic resources in Kingman that led to this and many others being listed. It was listed on the National Register in 1986.

== Description and history ==
It is a Colonial Revival style house built from adobe, topped by an asphalt-shingled hip roof. It was completed in 1887, making it one of the oldest houses in Kingman. The home was assembled elsewhere in northwest Arizona and transported to its permanent location by railroad.

From 1887 to 1911, Mr. Blakeley was a miner, lawyer, probate judge, on the school board, and the pastor of St. John's Methodist Church. This house was listed on the National Register of Historic Places on May 14, 1986.

== Renovation ==
The house was purchased in 2015 by Kingman resident and businessman Bill Barnes who then renovated it and had it re-zoned to commercial for use as an office.
