= Ransom B. Moore =

American rancher and politician (1827–1904)

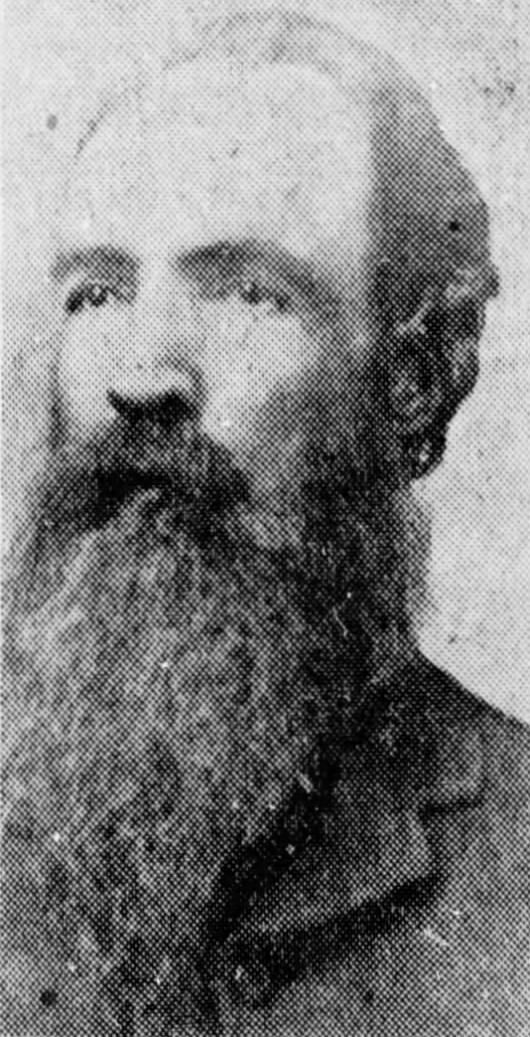

Member of the 16th Arizona Territorial Legislature
- In office 1891

Personal details
- Born: January 29, 1827 (location disputed)
- Died: November 18, 1904 (aged 74–75) Phoenix, Arizona, US
- Party: Democrat
- Profession: Rancher, politician

Ransom Barbee Moore, or Ranse Moore, (January 29, 1827 – November 18, 1904) was an American cattle rancher, local politician and Arizona territorial legislator in the late 19th and early 20th centuries. He was one of the earliest settlers of El Monte, California, and was the primary founder of Banning, California, which he initially named Moore City. Within a year the town was renamed in honor of his friend Phineas Banning, the "Father of the Port of Los Angeles".

== Early years ==
Moore was born to John Moore and Anna Rickman in 1827, the oldest of 12 children. Throughout most of his life he claimed to have been born in St. Joseph, Missouri, but researchers have concluded he more likely was born in Lawrence County, Arkansas. (Note: St Joseph, Missouri was not incorporated until 1843, and Joseph Robidoux IV did not establish the first trading post at that location until 1826. Moore's parents were married in Lawrence County, Arkansas in 1826 and the U.S. Federal Census records indicate they were still living in Lawrence County in 1830. The earliest Census to list Ransom Moore by name, the 1850 Census, states that he was born in Arkansas. It was only after that time Ransom began claiming he had been born in St. Joseph, Missouri.) Moore's family relocated to Blanco County, Texas in 1852.

Moore joined a wagon train led by MacCager Johnston and traveled to California. It was the first wagon train to travel to California via Yuma, Arizona on the Southern Emigrant Trail. In 1852 he arrived at "the end of the Santa Fe Trail" in El Monte, California, then called Lick-Skillet, where he involved himself in farming. Two years later he married Lidia Johnston, the daughter of MacCager, who had arrived in California on the same wagon train.

Moore served as a member of the Los Angeles County Board of Supervisors in 1860, but by 1864 the couple had moved to San Bernardino.

== San Gorgonio Pass ==
In 1865 Moore purchased a ranch in the San Gorgonio Pass. During his stay in the pass, his holdings increased to several hundred acres, and it included the water rights to the mountains north of his land. In 1877 he began the development of a new town, Moore City, where his land met the newly constructed Southern Pacific Railroad. The town was renamed in the same year to Banning, California.

For part of his stay in the Banning area, Moore was a Justice of the Peace. When his son John, a Deputy Sheriff in San Bernardino, married Georgia May Brown in 1880, Moore officiated their wedding.

In April, 1882, The Los Angeles Herald reported that Ransom Moore had been arrested in Banning, and brought to Los Angeles by Deputy U.S. Marshal Dunlap, on charges of "furnishing liquor to Indians". After the Indian Agent stationed in San Bernardino, Samuel S. Lawson, testified that he did not think Moore was a habitual offender, the charges were dropped.

In 1883 Moore sold his land and water rights in the Pass and moved to Arizona.

== Arizona ==
After arriving in the Arizona Territory, Moore established a new cattle ranch on land that was once part of Camp Reno, which had served as an outpost for Fort McDowell from 1866 to 1868. The Camp was a departure point for U.S. troops fighting the Tonto and Pinaleño Indians during the Apache Wars. After Moore took possession of the land, Camp Reno became known as Reno Ranch.

Two of Moore's sons, Thomas and William, also relocated to Arizona along with their wives and children. William eventually became a Deputy Sheriff, but Thomas was killed in 1884 while being pursued for the murder of man named Charles Hyde. Thomas and Charles had a dispute at a local bar which ended in Thomas shooting Charles.

In 1891 Ransom Moore served one term in the 16th Arizona Territorial Legislature. He died in Phoenix, Arizona on November 18, 1904. Earlier that same year had joined several others to form the Golden Star Mining and Milling Company. The corporation was initially capitalized with $1 million. Moore, as one of the primary investors, was also appointed to the Corporate Board.

Ransom and his wife divorced prior to the relocation to Arizona. She later remarried and died 20 years later, May 1924, in San Bernardino, California as Mrs. Lydia Bowers.

== See also ==
- Rio Verde, Arizona
