= Rio Verde, Arizona =

CDP in Maricopa County, Arizona

- Census-designated place
- Location in Maricopa County, Arizona

- Location within Arizona Location within the United States
- Coordinates: 33°43′40″N 111°40′27″W
- Country: United States
- State: Arizona
- County: Maricopa

Area
  - Total: 4.34 sq mi (11.23 km^{2})
  - Land: 4.33 sq mi (11.21 km^{2})
  - Water: 0.0039 sq mi (0.01 km^{2})
- Elevation: 1,601 ft (488 m)

Population (2020)
  - Total: 2,210
  - Density: 510.5/sq mi (197.11/km^{2})
- Time zone: UTC-7 (Mountain (MST))
- ZIP code: 85263
- Area code: 480
- FIPS code: 04-60250
- GNIS feature ID: 2409181

Rio Verde is a master-planned community east of Scottsdale in Arizona. It is a census-designated place (CDP) in Maricopa County, Arizona, United States located in the far northeast area of the Phoenix Metropolitan Area. The population was 2,210 as of the 2020 census, up from 1,811 at the 2010 census.

== History ==
The area surrounding the Rio Verde community, northeast of downtown Scottsdale, was settled by small farmers in the 1880s, who grew hay and alfalfa to provide for nearby Fort McDowell,l a US Army camp (1865–1890) (now the Fort McDowell Yavapai Nation). In the late 1890s, Frank Asher and William W. Moore acquired several of the small farm plots on the Verde River, combining them into what became the Box Bar Ranch; Moore later bought out Asher's interest. After his death in 1929, Moore's sons, Glen and Lin Moore, operated the Box Bar as a partnership, under the name "Moore Bros Cattle Co.", with grazing leases both east and west of the Verde River. Lin Moore also ran the X2 Ranch, known as "Moore's Well", 12 miles (19 km) to the west, where he and his wife, Ada Lucille, had homesteaded in the 1920s. William Moore's father, Ransom B. Moore, emigrated to Arizona from California in 1883 and ranched for many years on the Reno Ranch, west of the community of Punkin Center in Gila County. Ransom Moore, the founder of what is now Banning, California also was Gila County's delegate to the 16th Arizona Territorial Legislative Assembly in 1891.

The "Asher Hills" overlooking the community to the west, were named for Frank Asher, who had been Glen Moore's brother-in-law and William Moore's partner for a while. The granddaughter of Asher's wife Ella, Jacque Mercer, was Miss Arizona and then Miss America in 1949.

In 1954 the Moore brothers retired from the active cattle business and sold the ranch and their holdings to the Page Land & Cattle Co. (Lin Moore retained the X2 Ranch; after his death in 1960, his widow continued to operate the X2 until selling it in 1970.) The Moores' descendants, including historian Wyatt James, still reside in Maricopa County. A portion of Lin & Lucille Moore's homestead property on the foothills to the south, known as "The Ochoa Place", has recently been incorporated into the expanding McDowell Mountains McDowell Sonoran Preserve.

In 1970, Page Land & Cattle sold ranch land to Rio Verde Development, Inc., which in 1973 began to develop the tract as the master-planned community of Rio Verde. An 18-hole golf course was completed in 1973, and a second in 1981. Both were extensively renovated in 2007.

The unincorporated community's water is provided through 3 designated aquifers. EPCOR operates the private utility infrastructure they purchased from Rio Verde Utilities in 2018. Rio Verde has nothing to do with Rio Verde Foothills which was provided with water by the City of Scottsdale at cost until January 1, 2023, when the municipal supply was cut due to drought conditions. A planned water district for Rio Verde Foothills was rejected by the Maricopa County Board of Supervisors in August 2022; several residents filed a lawsuit against the City of Scottsdale to resume service.

== Community characteristics ==
Rio Verde is an established, member-owned and -governed active adult golfing and lifestyle community not to be confused with the adjacent Rio Verde Foothills. It is located near the Verde River and adjacent to the Tonto National Forest, the McDowell Mountain Regional Park, and the Fort McDowell Yavapai Nation. As of the 2020 census there were 1,676 housing units in the community, of which 1,215 were occupied by residents. The total developed area of the planned community, as of 2021, was 2.2 square miles (5.7 km^{2}), or 1,408 acres (570 ha), compared to 4.3 square miles (11 km^{2}) for the entire CDP. Rio Verde Community Church provides both interdenominational and Catholic services.

Rio Verde is an age-restricted community or "adult community", which means one member of each household must be at least 55 years of age and no person under 19 can be a permanent resident of the community. The community is governed by a homeowners' association under Arizona's planned community statutes.

== Geography ==
Rio Verde is located in northeastern Maricopa County. By road it is 28 miles (45 km) northeast of the historic center of Scottsdale and 37 miles (60 km) northeast of downtown Phoenix. According to the United States Census Bureau, the CDP has a total area of 4.3 square miles (11 km^{2}), all land. The Verde River, a south-flowing tributary of the Salt River, forms the eastern edge of the CDP and is about 0.7 miles (1.1 km) east of the developed community.

== Demographics ==
Historical population
Census	Pop.	Note	%±
2000	1,419		—
2010	1,811		27.6%
2020	2,210		22.0%
U.S. Decennial Census

=== 2020 census ===
As of the 2020 census, Rio Verde had a population of 2,210. The median age was 72.3 years. 0.2% of residents were under the age of 18 and 78.7% of residents were 65 years of age or older. For every 100 females there were 90.2 males, and for every 100 females age 18 and over there were 90.0 males age 18 and over.

94.8% of residents lived in urban areas, while 5.2% lived in rural areas.

There were 1,215 households in Rio Verde, of which 1.2% had children under the age of 18 living in them. Of all households, 72.8% were married-couple households, 7.7% were households with a male householder and no spouse or partner present, and 16.6% were households with a female householder and no spouse or partner present. About 22.1% of all households were made up of individuals and 18.8% had someone living alone who was 65 years of age or older.

There were 1,676 housing units, of which 27.5% were vacant. The homeowner vacancy rate was 2.9% and the rental vacancy rate was 28.3%.

Racial composition as of the 2020 census
Race	Number	Percent
White	2,130	96.4%
Black or African American	3	0.1%
American Indian and Alaska Native	8	0.4%
Asian	2	0.1%
Native Hawaiian and Other Pacific Islander	1	0.0%
Some other race	4	0.2%
Two or more races	62	2.8%
Hispanic or Latino (of any race)	31	1.4%

=== 2000 census ===
Rio Verde is a census-designated place (CDP). As of the census of 2000, there were 1,419 people, 761 households, and 634 families residing in the CDP. The population density was 261.9 inhabitants per square mile (101.1/km^{2}). There were 1,168 housing units at an average density of 215.5 per square mile (83.2/km^{2}). The racial makeup of the CDP was 99.7% White, 0.1% Native American, 0.1% Asian, 0.1% from other races, and 0.1% from two or more races. 0.3% of the population were Hispanic or Latino of any race.

There were 761 households, out of which 0.1% had children under the age of 18 living with them, 82.8% were married couples living together, 0.4% had a female householder with no husband present, and 16.6% were non-families. 15.5% of all households were made up of individuals, and 13.0% had someone living alone who was 65 years of age or older. The average household size was 1.86 and the average family size was 2.02.

In the CDP, the population was spread out, with 0.1% under the age of 18, 0.1% from 18 to 24, 1.3% from 25 to 44, 36.1% from 45 to 64, and 62.4% who were 65 years of age or older. The median age was 69 years. For every 100 females, there were 91.8 males. For every 100 females age 18 and over, there were 91.9 males. The median income for a household in the CDP was $86,248, and the median income for a family was $96,909. Males had a median income of $93,859 versus $60,357 for females. The per capita income for the CDP was $58,783. None of the families and 1.7% of the population were living below the poverty line, including no under eighteen and 2.1% of those over 64.

== Education ==
Portions of the CDP are in the Cave Creek Unified School District. The 2010 U.S. census said in the remainder, there was no defined school district.
