= 23rd Arizona Territorial Legislature =

Session of the Arizona Territorial Legislature (1905)

←	22nd	24th	→

Overview
- Legislative body: Arizona Territorial Legislature
- Jurisdiction: Arizona Territory, United States

Council
- Members: 12
- President: George W. P. Hunt

House of Representatives
- Members: 24
- Speaker: Wilfred T. Webb

The 23rd Arizona Territorial Legislative Assembly was a session of the Arizona Territorial Legislature which convened in Phoenix, Arizona, United States. The session ran from January 16, 1905, till March 16, 1905.

== Background ==
Governor Alexander Oswald Brodie was entering his final days in office as the legislative session began. Brodie resigned as governor on February 14, 1905, to return to his military career. His replacement, Joseph Henry Kibbey, was sworn into office on March 7, 1905.

The drive for the territory to achieve statehood continued. A proposal to merge Arizona and New Mexico territories and admit the combined entity as a single state had been made in the United States House of Representatives in 1902. The proposal had been initially defeated in the House but had won support in the United States Senate and a final resolution on the proposal was still to be determined.

== Legislative session ==
The legislative session began on January 16, 1905, and ran for 60 days.

=== Governor's address ===
Governor Brodie gave his address on the session's opening day. He began by describing the territory's financial condition was in the best condition it had ever been. Despite this he still urged tax reforms. The territory's mines had an assessed value of US$4,442,995 and paid US$178,000 in taxes to county and territorial governments. At the same time estimated annual output from the mines was estimated at $38,700,000. The governor wished to have the assessment methodology changed to base values on the gross output of territorial mines.

Besides discussing tax issues, Governor Brodie cautioned the session about the "growing evil of wife desertion" and asked for legislation to prevent the spread of the problem. He also recommended construction of a sanatorium to treat the many people suffering from tuberculosis immigrating to the territory. As the ill were coming from all parts of the county, the governor favored the "General Government" pay for the construction.

After taking office, Governor Kibbey sent a letter to the session asking for referendum on joint-statehood proposal.

=== Legislation ===
The session passed only 69 bills. With expectations that Arizona would soon be admitted as a state, the legislature failed to act on many issues. They did however hire an extremely large number of aides. Among the hires were 17 clerks paid to sit in the gallery as an audience and three pages who were charged with placing a cloth blindfold over the eyes of the statue of Liberty on top of the territorial capitol building.

Among the laws that were passed was a prohibition against gambling houses, saloons, and other establishments that promoted bad moral behavior within 4,000 feet (1,200 m) of the center of the territorial university. Selling of tobacco to anyone under age 16 was outlawed. Anyone owning a dog that lived within 1 mile (1.6 km) of the post office of any settlement with 1500 or more residents was required to purchase a dog license. Likewise the qualifications to hold the position of county attorney were modified to require that anyone who held the office be licensed to practice law. The session also created an office of public examiner.

In addition to the appropriations to various territorial institutions was US$10,000 for construction of a Rough Rider memorial in Prescott. The session also approved US$500 for the purchase of an engraved sword for Governor Brodie. Memorials sent to the United States Congress included a protest against Utah's efforts to annex the area of Arizona north of the Grand Canyon, appeals to increase the number of district judges within the territory and to increase the governor's salary to US$6,000/year, and a request for US$150,000 to complete the territorial capitol.

== Members ==
House of Representatives
Name	County	Name	County
LeRoy Anderson	Yavapai	L. R. Krueger	Maricopa
Neil E. Bailey	Cochise	Charles A. Neal	Coconino
Alexander Barker	Pinal	William Neville	Cochise
T. L. Bristol	Santa Cruz	J. B. Patterson	Apache
Lamar Cobb	Graham	M. A. Perkins	Yavapai
P. F. Collins	Mohave	Watson Pickrell	Maricopa
L. G. Davis	Pima	John H. Pomeroy	Maricopa
Q. R. Gardner	Navajo	M. A. Stanford	Maricopa
S. A. Haught	Gila	Charles Strong	Cochise
G. W. Hull	Yavapai	W. F. Timmons	Yuma
J. G. Keating	Pinal	Wilfred T. Webb (Speaker)	Graham
H. C. Kennedy	Pima	Thomas F. Wilson	Pima

Council
Name	County
John H. Page	Coconino
R. N. Looney	Yavapai
C. H. Cutting	Pinal
N. W. Bernard	Pima and Santa Cruz
M. J. Nugent	Yuma
Alfred Ruiz	Apache
J. E. Bark	Maricopa
George W. P. Hunt (President)	Gila
H. B. Rice	Graham
Stephen Roemer	Cochise
J. E. Perry	Mohave
Benjamin Downs	Navajo
