= Wilfred T. Webb =

American politician (1864–1938)

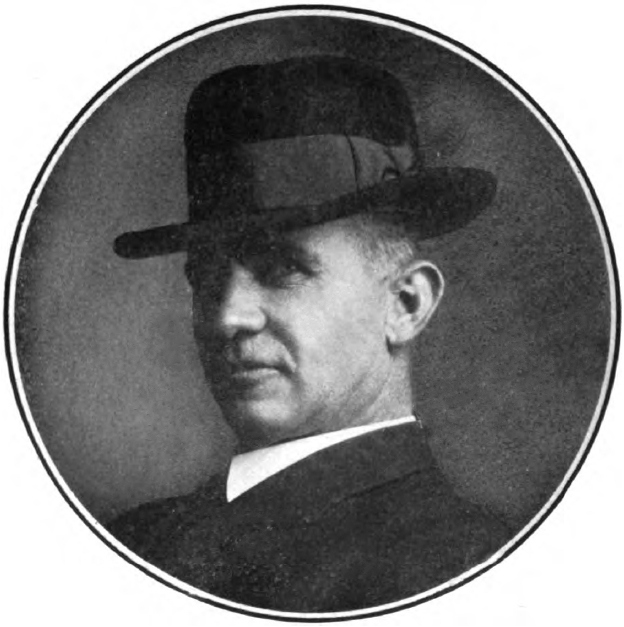
Wilfred Taft "W.T." Webb (c. 1913)

Wilfred Taft "W. T." Webb (March 22, 1864 – December 20, 1938) was an American politician who served twice as member of the Arizona Territorial Legislature.

== Biography ==
Webb was born in Salt Lake City to Chauncey Gilbert and Almira Sophia (Taft) Webb on March 22, 1864. He was educated in public schools before attending the University of Deseret (now the University of Utah). Webb moved to Tombstone, Arizona Territory in January 1881. He worked there as a miner for a short time before accepting a job helping to construct the Atlantic and Pacific Railroad in New Mexico Territory.

In 1883, Webb moved to Pima, Arizona Territory. He partnered with his father to operate a family store for a time. The family business was dissolved in 1887, at which time Webb become involved in raising livestock. In October of that year he married Sarah Burns at a ceremony in Salt Lake City. The couple remained married until her death on March 6, 1912.

Several Buffalo Soldiers who had fought against bandits during the Wham Paymaster Robbery identified Webb as being involved in the attack. As a result, he was arrested in June 1889. Unable to post bail, Webb was held until the trial. His father Gilbert, who was also arrested on the same charges, was able to make bail and spent several months locating people willing to testify and provide alibis to the accused. At trial, Webb and his fellow defendants were acquitted of all charges by a jury that is generally considered to have been biased against the black witnesses of the accusation and in favor of the accused. As a result of the trial, Webb became a lifetime friend to Marcus Aurelius Smith, who had served as defense counsel during the trial. His legal troubles did not end immediately however. For several years, territorial law officers investigated Webb for a variety of crimes including cattle rustling and banditry. Nothing ever became of the investigations. In later years, Webb was often asked if he was involved in the Wham robbery. His standard response was, "Twelve good men said I wasn't."

Beginning in 1891, Webb slowly expanded and diversified his business interests. This led to him eventually becoming owner of the 76 Ranch, director of the Bank of Safford, and President of the Webb-Merrill Commercial Company of Pima. At the same time, Webb became active in Democratic party politics. He was twice elected mayor of Pima and served in both the 22nd and 23rd Arizona Territorial Legislature. During his second term in the legislature, Webb was Speaker of the House of Representatives. As Arizona statehood approached, Webb was elected as a member of the new state's constitutional convention. He was also active in the Church of Jesus Christ of Latter-day Saints, serving as an elder in his local stake.

During the US Presidential Election of 1912, Webb became a presidential elector. He was also chosen as the messenger tasked with taking Arizona's official certificate of votes to Washington D.C. While en route, he disappeared near St. Louis, Missouri. United States law at the time required the messenger to present the official vote certificates to the President of the United States Senate by the fourth Monday of January or face a $1000 fine and loss of mileage allowance. Webb had been informed by a lawyer friend that the certificates did not need to arrive in Washington until February 1, 1913 and was surprised to learn on January 28 that Arizona's congressional delegation were searching for him. He took a train from New York City, where he learned of the search, to Washington. The official certificate was delivered a day late but Webb's explanation was determined sufficient to excuse him for the tardiness and allow him to collect a $642.75 mileage reimbursement. The reason for Webb's delay did not become publicly known for almost a year-and-a-half. On June 13, 1914, Webb married Claire Noelke of St. Louis, Missouri. The delay had come because Webb had stayed in St. Louis for several days to court his future wife instead of proceeding directly to Washington. Prior to their marriage, she had been a light opera singer.

Webb died in Los Angeles, California on December 20, 1938. He had gone to the city seeking medical treatment. He was buried at the Pima Cemetery in Pima, Arizona.
