= Ross H. Blakely House =

Historic house in Arizona, United States

- U.S. National Register of Historic Places
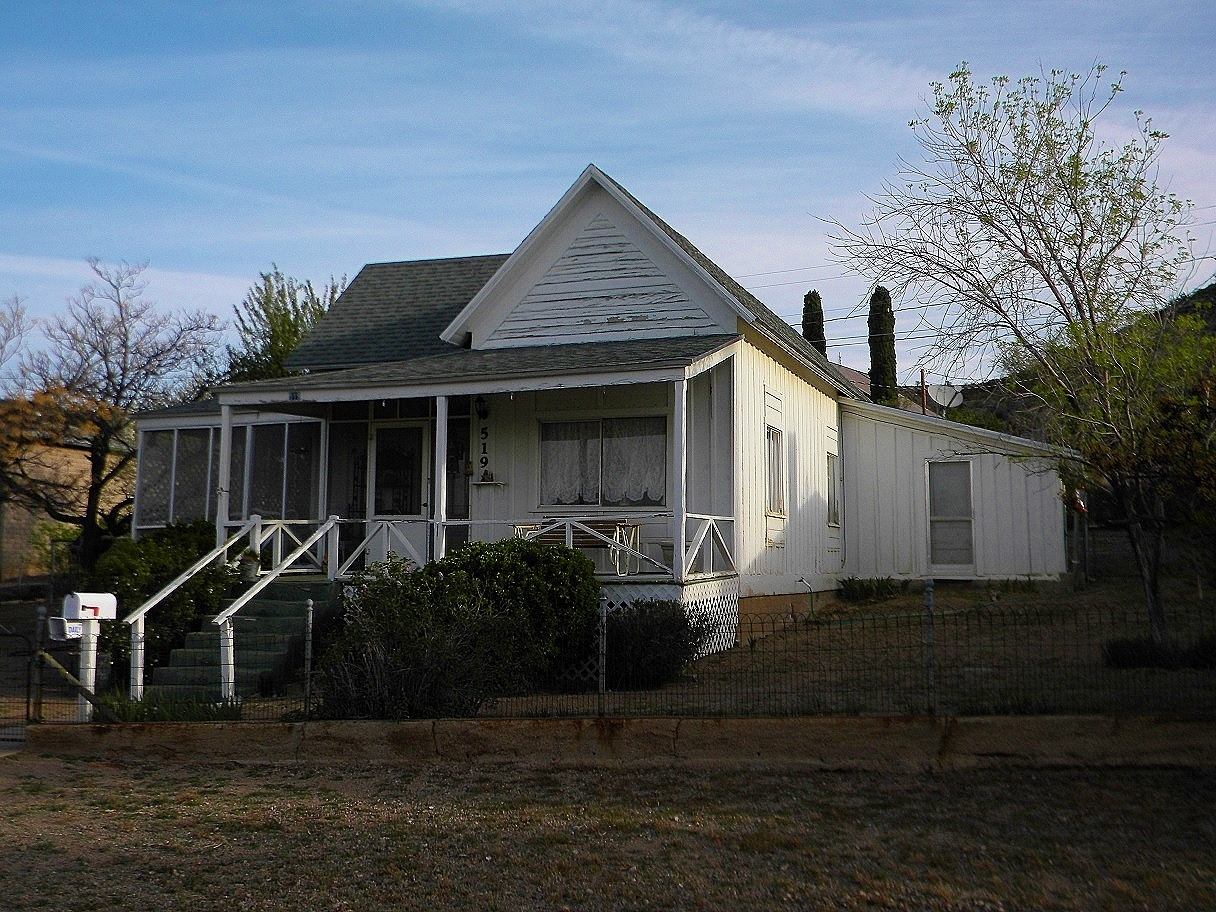

- Location within Arizona Location within the United States
- Location: Kingman, Arizona
- Coordinates: 35°11′29″N 114°2′56″W
- Built: 1897
- Architectural style: Queen Anne
- MPS: Kingman MRA
- NRHP reference No.: 86003763
- Added to NRHP: January 7, 1988

The Ross H. Blakely House is a Queen Anne style house located in Kingman, Arizona. The house is listed on the National Register of Historic Places.

== Description ==
The Ross H. Blakely House is located at 519 Spring Street in Kingman, Arizona. The home was built in 1897 and it is a Queen Anne style. Ross Blakeley was the son of William G. Blakely. He passed the bar in 1910 and started his practice. He also did some ranching. He served in county and territorial positions and was very active in the civic affairs of Kingman. The home was added to the National Register of Historic Places in 1988.
