= 22nd Arizona Territorial Legislature =

Session of the Arizona Territorial Legislature (1903)

←	21st	23rd	→

Overview
- Legislative body: Arizona Territorial Legislature
- Jurisdiction: Arizona Territory, United States

Council
- Members: 12
- President: Eugene S. Ives

House of Representatives
- Members: 24
- Speaker: Theodore T. Powers

The 22nd Arizona Territorial Legislative Assembly was a session of the Arizona Territorial Legislature which convened in Phoenix, Arizona. The session ran from January 19, 1903, until March 19, 1903.

== Background ==
Governor Oakes Murphy announced his intention to resign in early 1902. His replacement, Alexander Oswald Brodie took office on July 1, 1902. Statehood efforts meanwhile had encountered an obstacle. A proposal had been made in the United States Congress that Arizona and New Mexico territories be combined and admitted as a single state. The proposal had been initially made in the United States House of Representatives and was defeated in May 1902 by a vote of 106 to 28. Following the initial defeat, Senator Albert J. Beveridge of Indiana had become a supporter of joint statehood and the battle over the idea continued in the United States Senate. Seeking support in his efforts to defeat the proposal, Arizona Territorial Delegate Marcus A. Smith had sent a telegraph requesting the legislature pass a resolution in opposition to the proposal.

== Legislative session ==
The session began on January 19, 1903, and ran for 60 days. During that time it passed 93 acts, 10 memorials, and a single joint resolution.

=== Governor's address ===
The address was given by Governor Brodie on January 20, 1903. It began with a review of territorial finances. This was followed by recommended reforms for the territorial incorporation and tax laws. The governor asked for a change allowing elections of county supervisors and legislators to be based upon legislative districts instead of being selected at-large. He called for constables, justices of the peace, and sheriffs to be paid by salary instead of continuing the existing system where they kept a portion of their collected fees. Brodie also asked for legislators to perform a study on the issue of 8-hour days for mine workers

In other matters, the governor recommended the Pioneers' Historical Society be given legislative support in their efforts to collect and preserve historical information. To complete finishing touches on a new industrial school in Benson, he asked for labor to be provided by inmates from the territorial penitentiary. Two gifts of US$5,000 each to the University of Arizona needed legislative attention before they could be used to construct a gymnasium and mechanical arts hall. Finally, Brodie asked for the salary of the governor's personal secretary to be increased from $125 to $150/month.

=== Legislation ===
The session made a number of changes affecting the railroads. The hiring of railroad police was authorized. The session also granted a ten-year tax exemption to new railroads. Conversely, railroads in the territory were prohibited from having employees work more than 16 consecutive hours. Other industries were also affected. A tax exemption promoting the construction of storage dams and sugar beet processing facilities was passed. Opening of saloons within 6 miles (9.7 km) of public works was prohibited. The practice of paying employees with tokens, scrip, or company store credits instead of legal tender was banned. An eight-hour work day was also implemented by the session.

A requirement that the American flag be raised over schools was implemented. Any school district containing at least 100 residents were granted authority to hire music and art teachers. A special levy was passed to provide funds to expand the Tempe Normal School. A territorial board of health was created. Licensing requirements for dentists and physicians were enacted. A bill repealing the requirement that outstanding tax assessments be paid before a court appeal could be filed suffered a pocket veto. A 50-year, $100,000 loan to the territorial insane asylum was authorized to allow the facility to make needed improvements. Improvements were intended to allow the facility to have enough space to separate patients with different types of problems into different areas. The session also transferred handling of incorporation filing fees from the Territorial Secretary to the office of the territorial auditor. The change resulted in the filing fees going directly into the territorial treasury.

Final passage of a women's suffrage bill occurred on Saint Patrick's Day 1903. The bill was passed by the House on a lark and the Council did not pass the measure until assured it would be vetoed. Governor Brodie's veto was based upon his understanding that the Arizona Organic Act failed to grant the legislature the needed authority to give women the right to vote. Addressing the joint statehood proposal before the United States Congress, Eugene S. Ives, President of the council, convinced the council to pass a resolution supporting joint resolution but inserting a provision that the electorate of each territory must approve the new state's constitution separately. If implemented, this would have effectively granted Arizona voters a veto capability over joint statehood. The Council resolution was telegraphed to Congress on February 26, 1903, as a joint resolution. The House, not agreeing with Ives' indirect attack on the joint statehood proposal, placed their support behind Marcus A. Smith's efforts to defeat the joint statehood bill the United States Senate.

== Aftermath ==
Implementation of the eight-hour work day for miners resulted in labor strife. Miners who had previously been paid $2.50 for a ten-hour day were demanding the same pay for an eight-hour day. Mine owners offered nine hours pay ($2.25), arguing they could not afford a 25% increase in hourly pay rates. Mine strikes began on June 1, 1903, when the law limiting miners to an eight-hour day went into effect. The strike by 1,500 miners resulted in an additional 2,000 workers at smelters and other mineral processing tasks being put out of their jobs. In an effort to prevent bloodshed, the Arizona Rangers eventually became involved in suppressing the striker's marches.

Opposition to the joint statehood proposal continued for several years and a final resolution did not occur until November 1906.

== Members ==
House of Representatives
Name	County	Name	County
N. W. Bernard	Pima	J. M. O'Connell	Cochise
Lucius R. Burrow	Yavapai	John H. Page	Coconino
George U. Collins	Maricopa	W. A. Parr	Navajo
Lawrence O. Cowan	Pima	Theodore T. Powers (Speaker)	Maricopa
Nasianceno Gonzales	Apache	Stephen Roemer	Cochise
Joseph B. Henry	Gila	W. A. Rowe	Yavapai
L. C. Herr	Pinal	P. A. Schilling	Pinal
James A. Howell	Cochise	Kean St. Charles	Mohave
F. S. Ingaills	Yuma	Wilfred T. Webb	Graham
M. Lamont	Pima	B. J. Whiteside	Santa Cruz
J. D. Marlar	Maricopa	Gus Williams	Graham
T. J. Morrison	Yavapai	James W. Woolf	Maricopa

Council
Name	County
Henry F. Ashurst	Coconino
J. W. Burson	Yavapai
E. W. Childs	Pinal
Joseph B. Corbett	Pima and Santa Cruz
Eugene S. Ives (President)	Yuma
Heber Jarvis	Apache
Joseph Henry Kibbey	Maricopa
A. H. Morehead	Gila
H. B. Rice	Graham
B. A. Packard	Cochise
John R. Whiteside	Mohave
J. X. Woods	Navajo
