= Fletcher Morris Doan =

American jurist (1846–1924)

Fletcher M. Doan
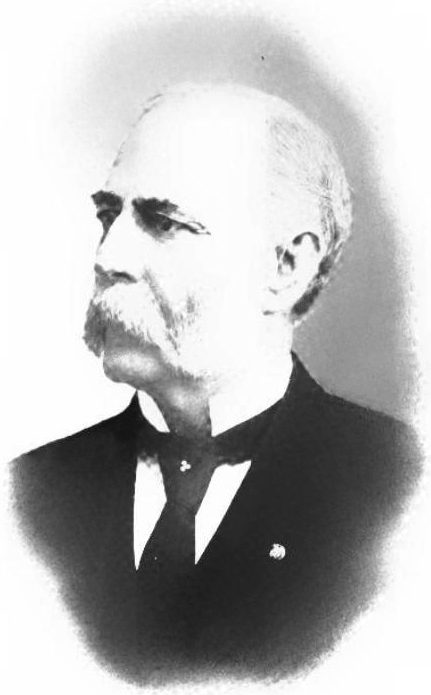

Associate Justice, Arizona Territorial Supreme Court
- In office July 20, 1897 – February 14, 1912
- Nominated by: William McKinley; Theodore Roosevelt; William Howard Taft
- Preceded by: Owen Thomas Rouse
- Succeeded by: position eliminated due to Arizona statehood

Personal details
- Born: July 21, 1846 Circleville, Ohio
- Died: October 28, 1924 (aged 78) Douglas, Arizona
- Party: Republican
- Spouse: Anna Murray (m. 1873–1916)
- Profession: Attorney

Fletcher Morris Doan (July 21, 1846 – October 28, 1924) was an American jurist who served as an Associate Justice on the Arizona Territorial Supreme Court from 1897 until Arizona gained statehood in 1912.

== Biography ==
Doan was born to John and Maria Doan on July 21, 1846 in Circleville, Ohio. He was raised on a farm and attended public schools. Doan graduated from Ohio Wesleyan University with a Bachelor of Arts in 1868. He obtained his law degree from Albany Law School in 1869. Following law school, Doan established his practice in Pike County, Missouri despite having been admitted to the New York Bar. He remained there for a decade before moving his practice to St. Louis. He earned a Master of Arts from Ohio Wesleyan University in 1872. Doan married Anna Murray, the daughter of Judge Samuel F. Murray, on December 25, 1869. The couple had three sons who lived to maturity.

Moving to Yuma, Arizona Territory in January 1888, Doan spent the next few years working on irrigation projects. The projects proved economically unsuccessful and he and his partners eventually abandoned their efforts. Doan joined the Arizona territorial bar in 1894 and was elected to a two-year term as Pinal County district attorney the same year.

Nominated to the territorial supreme court on June 26, 1897, and took his oath of office on July 20, 1897. He was reappointed in December 1901, again on March 21, 1906, and again in January 1910.

He was assigned to district two, which initially consisted of Gila, Graham, and Pima counties. In 1903, Gila county was removed from the district and replaced with Cochise county. In 1905 the district was reduced to just Cochise and Santa Cruz counties. He authored almost 100 opinions while serving on the territorial supreme court. Decisions authored by Doan were appealed to the United States Supreme Court sixteen times. Twelve of the decisions were upheld, three reversed, and in the case of Sherman and Penny v. Goodwin, 12 Arizona 42 (1908), the U.S. Supreme Court ruled that it lacked jurisdiction and dismissed the issue.

Notable opinions included:

- Alvin Johns v. James Wilson, 6 Arizona 125, (1898)
- Consolidated Canal Company v. Mesa Canal Company, 6 Arizona 135
- Clinton Wiser v. John Lawler, 7 Arizona 163 (1900)

He was a Republican candidate for a seat on the Arizona Supreme Court in 1911, but did not win election to the seat. After leaving the bench, he practiced law in Tombstone, moving Douglas several months later to form a law partnership with his son. The firm of Doan & Doan was dissolved in 1921, with the elder Doan joining the new firm of Doan & Stephenson.

Doan's wife died November 16, 1916.

Doan died at his home in Douglas on October 28, 1924, and was buried in Tucson's Evergreen Cemetery.
