= 17th Arizona Territorial Legislature =

Session of the Arizona Territorial Legislature (1893)

←	16th	18th	→

Overview
- Legislative body: Arizona Territorial Legislature
- Jurisdiction: Arizona Territory, United States

Council
- Members: 12
- President: T. G. Norris

House of Representatives
- Members: 24
- Speaker: Frank Baxter

The 17th Arizona Territorial Legislative Assembly was a session of the Arizona Territorial Legislature which convened in Phoenix, Arizona. The session ran from February 13 through April 13, 1893.

== Background ==
Expectations were that Arizona would soon achieve statehood. Following the constitutional convention authorized by the previous session, Territorial Delegate Marcus A. Smith had submitted an Arizona statehood bill that had passed the United States House of Representatives but was blocked in the Senate by Republicans who did not wish to grant the predominantly Democratic territory two new senators. The Democratic party won control of the Senate during the 1892 elections, removing the ability of Republicans to block the legislation, and Smith would submit a new statehood bill in the next Congressional session.

Oakes Murphy had been promoted from Territorial Secretary to Governor following the resignation of Governor Irwin With the inauguration of U.S. President Grover Cleveland imminent, candidates were vying to replace Murphy as the legislative session began. L. C. Hughes would be sworn in as territorial Governor on April 12, 1893.

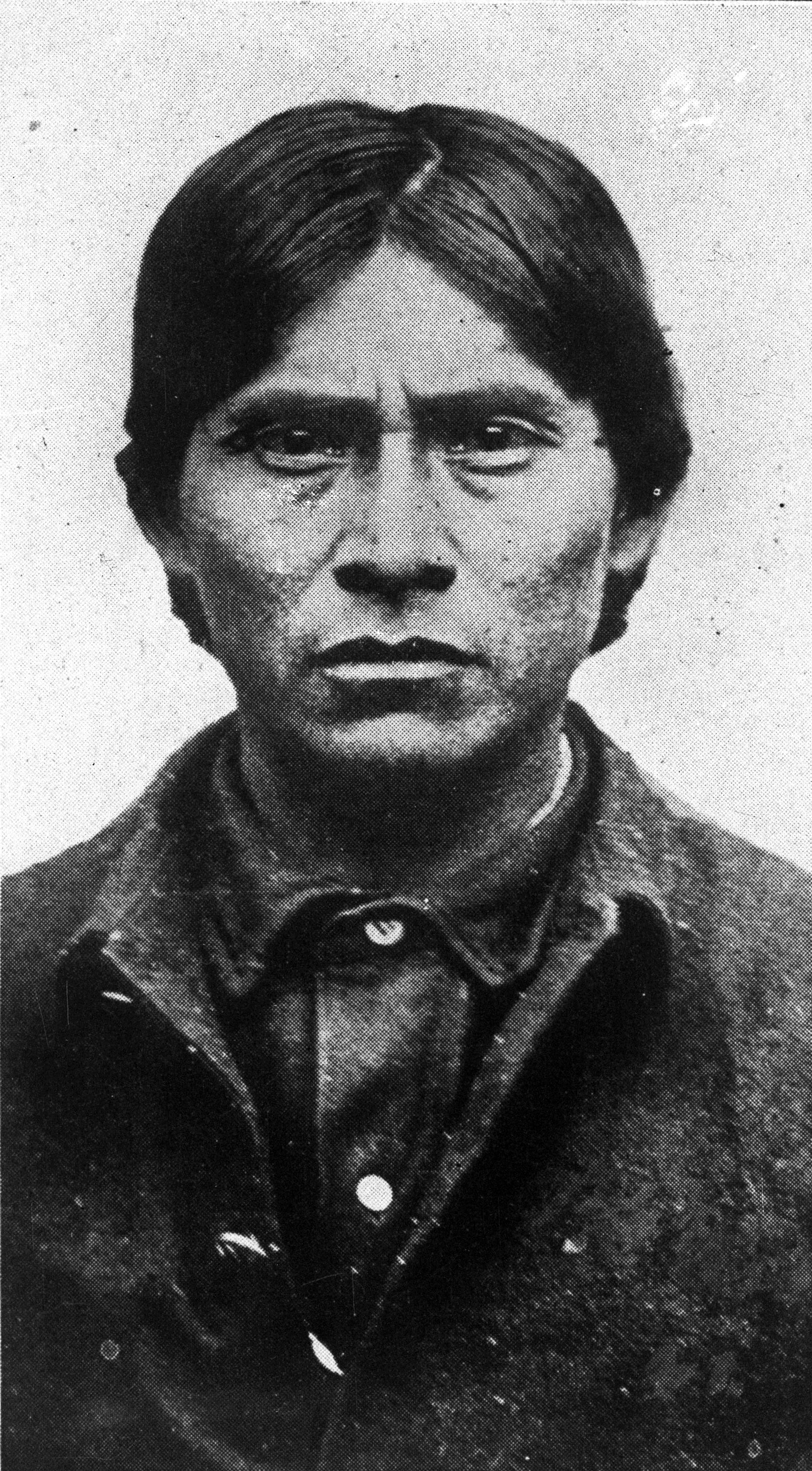
The Apache Kid

Of concern to the citizens of Arizona Territory was the Apache Kid, who had become one of the most feared outlaws of the prior decade.

== Legislative session ==
The legislature convened on February 13, 1893. During the 60-day session, 91 laws were passed.

=== Governor's address ===
Governor Murphy gave the address on February 14, 1893. It began by the Acting Governor expressing his desire for this session to be the last before statehood. A large portion of the speech was dedicated to territorial finances. With the rapid increases to the territory's population, governmental services needed additional revenue to support educational and law enforcement needs. Murphy criticized practices that allowed assessed property values to remain the same over multiple years despite steady gains in real values. He was further concerned that the majority of the funds for territorial schools was derived from taxes paid by the gambling industry.

In the area of proposed legislation, Murphy sought to regulate the railroads "wherever the people's interests are concerned" He asked to have the employment of women in saloons prohibited while seeking to require a "high license" for the sale of alcohol as an alternative to prohibition. The Acting Governor additionally wanted to replace existing the territory-wide regulations on gambling with local option laws. He desired to create a licensing requirement to practice medicine. Additionally, Murphy asked for a law prohibiting Indians from carrying weapons off the reservation and wanted to move the territorial prison from Yuma to a more central location.

=== Legislation ===
In a move intended to prepare the territory for statehood, the session created a board to regulate the dentistry profession. A reform school was authorized to be built in Flagstaff. Similarly, a territorial library was authorized for Phoenix while a museum for preservation of the territory's archeological artifacts was authorized to be built at the University of Arizona. The session passed a law requiring canal owners to remove sunflowers and cockleburs from the banks of the canals. Finally, in a bill introduced by George W. P. Hunt, the session authorized a US$5,000 bounty for the capture, dead or alive, of the Apache Kid.

=== Concurrent activities ===
As the session was in progress, efforts were underway to have a new governor appointed. Territorial Delegate Marcus A. Smith wrote to President Cleveland on March 22, 1893, saying "The Legislature is now in session and will adjourn on the 13th of April. The newly installed Governor must have several days in which to make a judicious selection of the important officers under his appointment. The Federal Statutes ... provide ... that the Governor of the Territory, by and with the consent on the Council, shall name the Territorial officers. When the Legislature adjourns there will be no Council to act in harmony with him."

The new Governor, L. C. Hughes, was not nominated until April 4, 1893, and, following confirmation by the U.S. Senate did not take office till the last full day of the legislative session. Unlike the 15th Arizona Territorial Legislature, the legislature did not extend the session to allow the new Governor a chance to make officer nominations of his own choosing.

== Members ==
House of Representatives
Name	County	Name	County
Frank Baxter (Speaker)	Maricopa	M. E. Hurley	Maricopa
S. P. Behan	Yavapai	Robert N. Leatherwood	Pima
A. D. Brewer	Graham	J. A. Marshall	Maricopa
J. W. Bruce	Pima	Luther Martin	Apache
Dennis A. Burke	Yavapai	Charles A. Mehan	Pima
J. D. Cook	Yavapai	James Reilly	Cochise
W. T. Day	Pinal	Henry C. Rogers	Maricopa
R. C. Dryden	Apache	Henry D. Ross	Coconino
D. M. Field	Yuma	C. F. Schumaker	Pima
Mike Gray	Cochise	George Skinner	Graham
Thomas C. Graham	Pinal	David Southwiick	Mohave
George W. P. Hunt	Gila	Austin C. Wright	Cochise

Council
Name	County
George W. Cheyney	Cochise
Foster S. Dennis	Mohave
Andrew J. Doran	Pinal
E. J. Edwards	Gila
John J. Hawkins	Yavapai
J. Lorenzo Hubbell	Apache
William M. Lovell	Pima
F. R. Nellis	Coconino
T. G. Norris (President)	At Large
M. J. Nugent	Yuma
Charles M. Shannon	Graham
W. T. Smith	Maricopa

- At Large Council member chosen by entire territory
