= Arizona Pioneers' Home =

Retirement home in Arizona, United States

- U.S. National Register of Historic Places
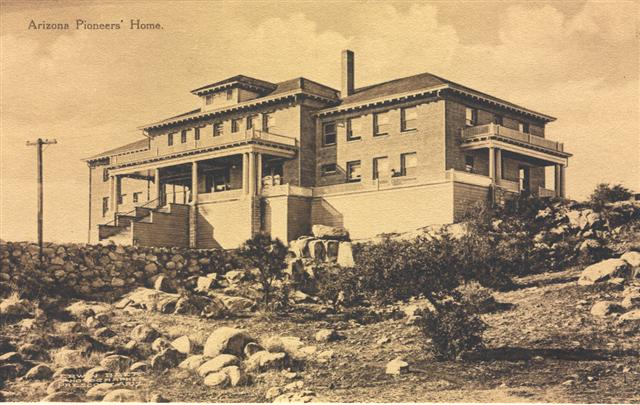
- Arizona Pioneers' Home ca. 1912

- Location within Arizona Location within the United States
- Location: Prescott, Arizona, US
- Coordinates: 34.5375°N 112.4736°W
- Built: 1911
- Architect: W.S. Elliott
- NRHP reference No.: 95001363
- Added to NRHP: November 20, 1995

The Arizona Pioneers' Home, also known as the Home for Arizona Pioneers and State Hospital for Disabled Miners, is a retirement home in Prescott, Arizona, established to provide housing for early Arizona pioneers. The home is operated and funded by the state of Arizona. The building is listed on the National Register of Historic Places.

== History ==
In the early 20th century, the idea for a retirement home in the Arizona Territory originated with three prominent Arizonans: Major A. J. Doran, a judge and territorial representative; rancher Johnny Duke; and businessman Frank M. Murphy, the brother of former Arizona territorial governor Oakes Murphy. They thought that Arizona should provide a rest home for aging settlers who moved to Arizona to help establish the area. Doran sponsored a bill to fund the idea, presented to the 24th Arizona Territorial Legislature in 1907, but it was not passed. Journalist Sharlot Hall handled clerical duties regarding the bill. Submitted again in 1909, both houses of the legislature passed the bill, and Territorial Governor Joseph Henry Kibbey signed the bill into law on March 11, 1909. Sited on a prominent granite hill overlooking Prescott's town square, Murphy put up 4.5 acres (1.8 ha) of his land for the building. Judge T.G. Norris later donated adjacent land for expansion. To design the building, a female architect was selected: W.S. Elliott of Prescott, who had come to prominence for her work on St. Joseph's Academy. The three-story retirement home, built of brick with wooden porticos, was completed at a cost of $25,000. Doors opened on February 1, 1911, with Doran as supervisor. Doran presided for the first year, during which time Arizona became a state.

When first built, the rest home could hold 40 men. It was open to destitute men who were at least 60 years old and who had been living in Arizona for 25 years. In 1916, a private endowment provided for expansion with a women's wing added to house 20 women. The building was opened to disabled miners in 1927.

Big Nose Kate, born Mary Katherine Horony, was admitted to the home in 1931 after six months of applications, finally appealing successfully to her longtime friend, governor George W. P. Hunt. Kate, once the common-law wife of Doc Holliday and later the wife of blacksmith George M. Cummings, had first gained notoriety as the madam of a brothel. She stayed at the rest home until her death in 1940 at the age of 90.

In 1947, Life magazine featured the home and its residents in a colorful story titled, "Old Pioneers' Home: Retired to state home, oldsters spit, cuss and fight with canes". Devoted primarily to a description of the quirky characters living there, the article said that the state-sponsored rest home was the only one in the U.S., not counting one in the Territory of Alaska built to house aging Klondike Gold Rushers. Superintendent Jack Sills said that applicants were required to have lived in Arizona for 35 years, and that residents were given $7.50 each month to spend as they wished, usually on alcohol and tobacco. The Life article was described in detail in 1974 in a writeup published in The Prescott Courier in which reporter Claudette Simpson said that Life angered some locals for its crudely humorous portrayal of idiosyncratic and cantankerous residents, the humor delivered at the expense of Prescott's dignity. In 2010, Superintendent Ted Ihrman said that the Life piece had added "some historical significance to the home."

== Today ==
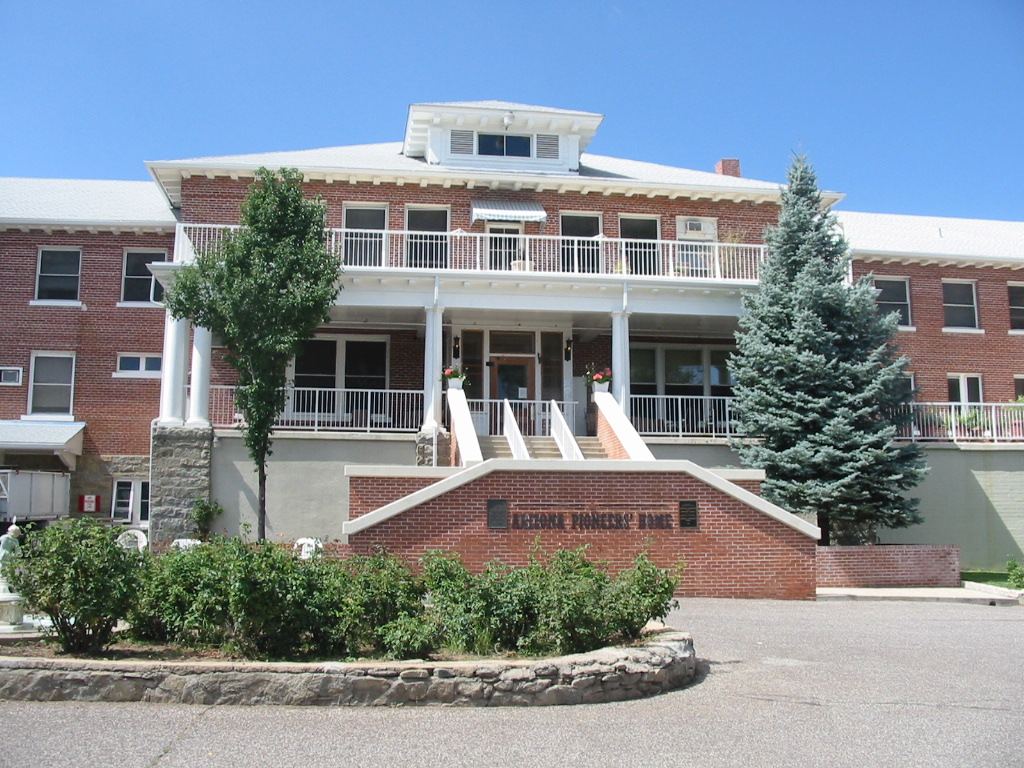
Front entrance in 2012

The expanded complex of buildings can hold 155 residents, and was at 71% capacity in October 2010. Its operating expenses are provided mainly by about $5 million each year from the state, and by some residents who pay a portion of their own care. Applicants must have lived in Arizona for 50 years. Residents who died were buried in the Home's cemetery. In 2011, the retirement home celebrated its 100th anniversary with tours and open-house events.

== Notable residents ==
Various historic figures have lived at the home or are buried there.

- Kate Cory (1861–1958) artist and photographer of the Hopi
- Sharlot Hall (1870–1943) territorial historian (resided 1909–12)
- Big Nose Kate (1850–1940) saloon-keeper in Tombstone
- Effie Anderson Smith (1869–1955) Western landscape painter
- Albert Franklin Banta (1843–1924) early pioneer and founder of several Arizona newspapers
- Jeff Cooper (1920–2006) firearms expert and founder of the American Pistol Institute in Yavapai County
