= William G. Blakely =

American politician (1829–1920)

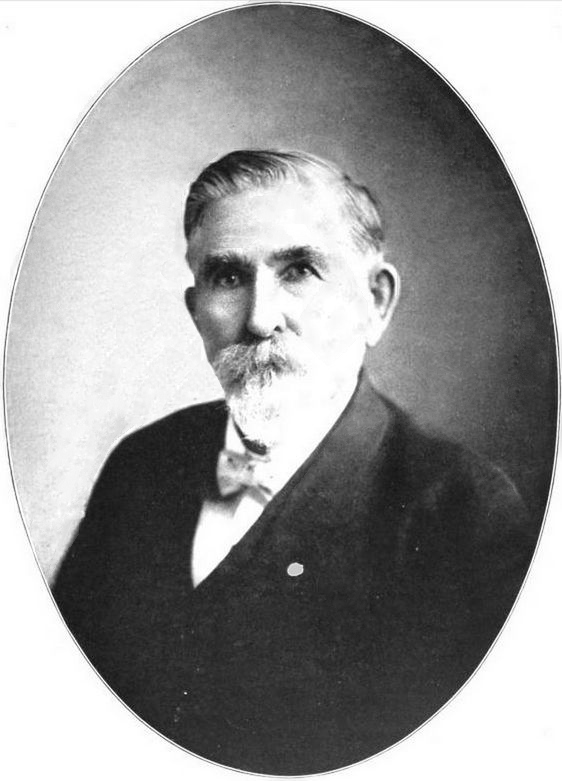

Member of the 24th Arizona Territorial Legislature
- In office January 21, 1907 – March 21, 1907

Personal details
- Born: August 29, 1829 Kortright, New York, US
- Died: April 19, 1920 (aged 90) Kingman, Arizona, US
- Party: Republican
- Children: Ross H. Blakely
- Profession: Politician, Judge

William G. Blakely (August 29, 1829 – April 19, 1920) was an American miner, lawyer, and a Methodist minister. He served as a district attorney, judge, and legislator in Arizona, where he lived the majority of his life.

== Biography ==
Blakely was born in the Delaware County town of Kortright, New York on August 29, 1829. He was educated first in the local school system, then at the Delaware Academy, and graduated from the New York State Normal School in Albany. In 1849, he left for California in pursuit of riches during the gold rush. After four years of mining, he returned to New York and paid off the mortgage on his father's farm with his mining wealth. He then studied law in Delhi at the office of Amasa J. Parker after which he returned to California, settling in Sonora, where he practiced law and continued mining. In Sonora, he discovered the prosperous Eureka mine in 1858.

Blakely was ordained a minister of the Methodist church, receiving a license from the California Methodist Episcopal conference. In 1861, he left California and moved his family to Carson City in the adjacent Nevada Territory where he began the practice of law. He was appointed Nevada Superintendent of Public Instruction by Governor James W. Nye in 1861 and was heavily involved in organizing the territory's public school system. Blakely then relocated to Austin where he constructed a Methodist Episcopal Church and served as its pastor. He simultaneously continued mining and developed a stamp mill to treat gold-bearing quartz from the Mother Vein mine.

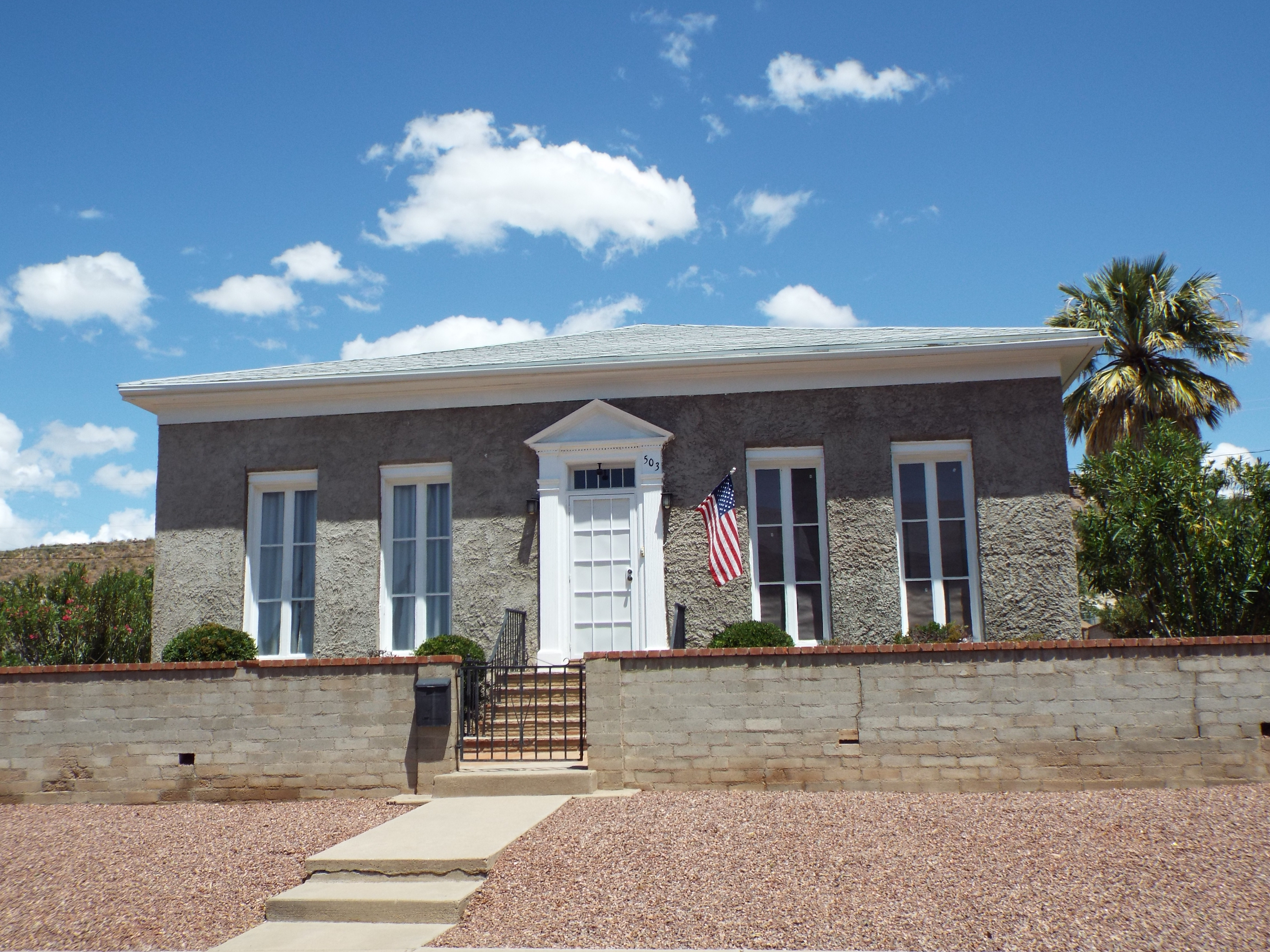
The William G. Blakeley House built in 1887 in Kingman, Az.

Blakely then moved to Pioche where he continued mining and practicing law. He also developed mines in Cerbat and Mineral Park in the Arizona Territory. He moved again in 1871 to Kingman, the county seat of Mohave County where he was elected judge of the Mohave county court and later appointed by Governor C. Meyer Zulick as probate judge and superintendent of schools. In 1880, he was first elected Mohave County district attorney, serving until 1904. During this period, Blakely continued his law practice. He was the attorney in Kingman for the Atchison, Topeka, and Santa Fe Railroad, and also represented many other large mines and businesses in the area.

In 1893, Blakely was selected to be a permanent representative of Mohave County to the statehood committee. He then became a superior court judge, and representative in the upper house of the 24th Arizona Territorial Legislature of 1907. He introduced a bill to prohibit the sale of alcohol in the territory and another to prohibit "the establishment of a saloon within one mile of an educational institution". Blakely was an honorary member of the Woman's Christian Temperance Union and publicly spoke in support of prohibition based on his experiences with alcohol consumption in mining communities.

In 1908, Blakely was appointed district attorney again to fill a vacancy caused when the elected district attorney resigned to move to Los Angeles. In 1910, he accepted a pastorship in Kingman, a position he held previously before devoting more time to his other professions.

Blakely died on April 19, 1920. The funeral procession from the church to the cemetery was reported to have included "the longest line of automobiles ever seen at a funeral" in Kingman.

== Personal ==
On September 5, 1853, Blakely married Susan Elizabeth Wilson (Note: Her obituary refers to her only as Mrs. William G. Blakely.) from Orange County, New York. Mrs. Blakely was born on August 20, 1829, and died in Kingman on August 20, 1899. They had four sons, including Ross H. Blakely. His eldest son, John E. Blakely, committed suicide in October 1907 at age 37. The suicide was attributed to alcoholism. Blakely's other two sons, William G. Jr and James W., both died in 1899.

Blakely's house, built in 1887 and located at 503 Spring Street in Kingman, has been listed on the National Register of Historic Places since 1986.

Blakely was a brother in the Elks Kingman Lodge.
