= William W. Pace =

Arizona politician

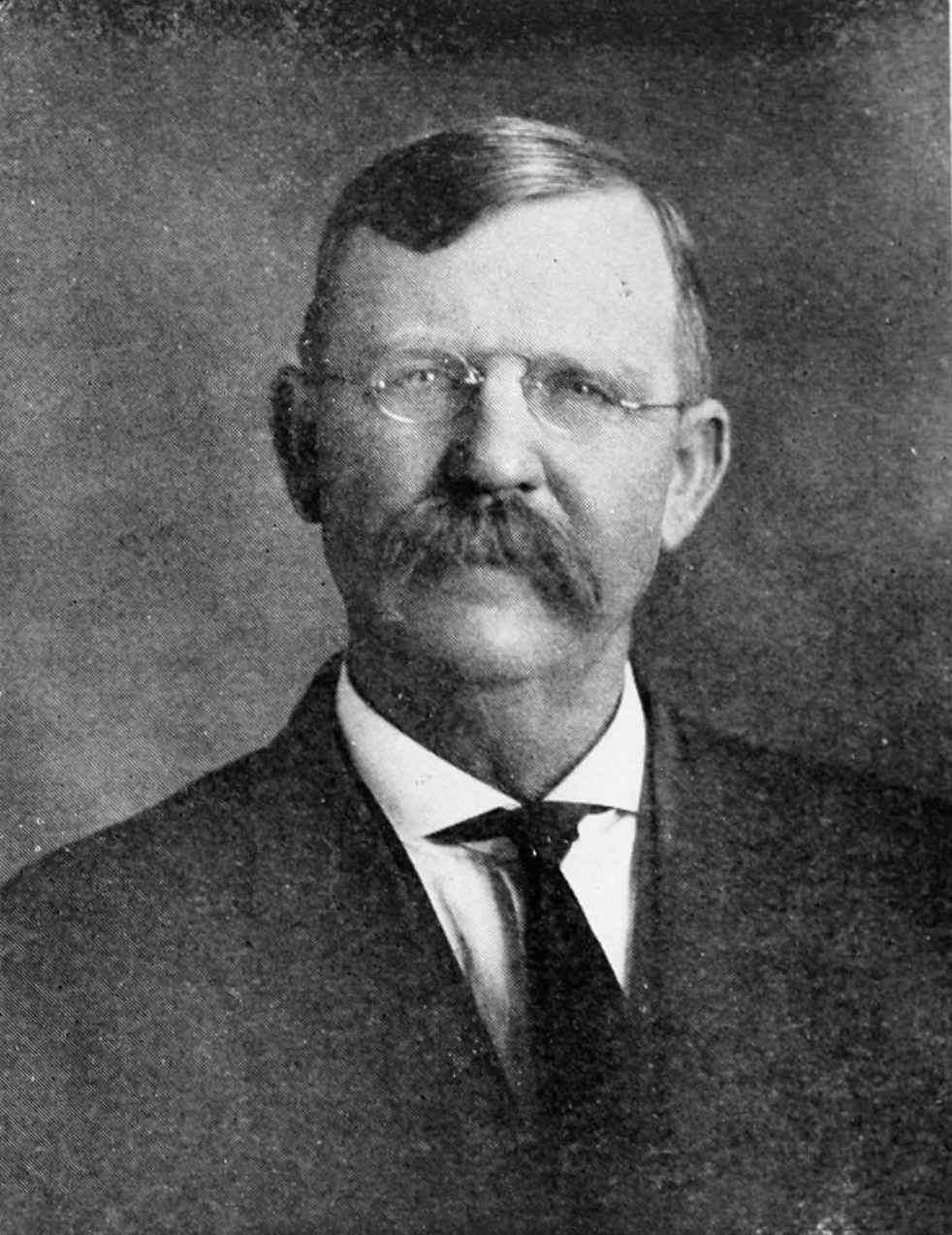

Member of the Arizona Senate from the Gila County district
- In office March 1912 – January 1915
- Preceded by: First Senator from Gila County
- Succeeded by: David H. Claridge

Personal details
- Born: June 8, 1857 Spanish Fork, Utah
- Died: September 8, 1931 (aged 74) Thatcher, Arizona
- Party: Democratic
- Spouse: Catherine
- Children: 7 sons, 2 daughters
- Profession: Politician

William Wilson Pace (June 8, 1857 – September 8, 1931) was an American politician and cattleman from Arizona. He was a member of three territorial legislatures prior to statehood, and was a member of the Arizona State Senate in the 1st Arizona State Legislature.

== Life ==
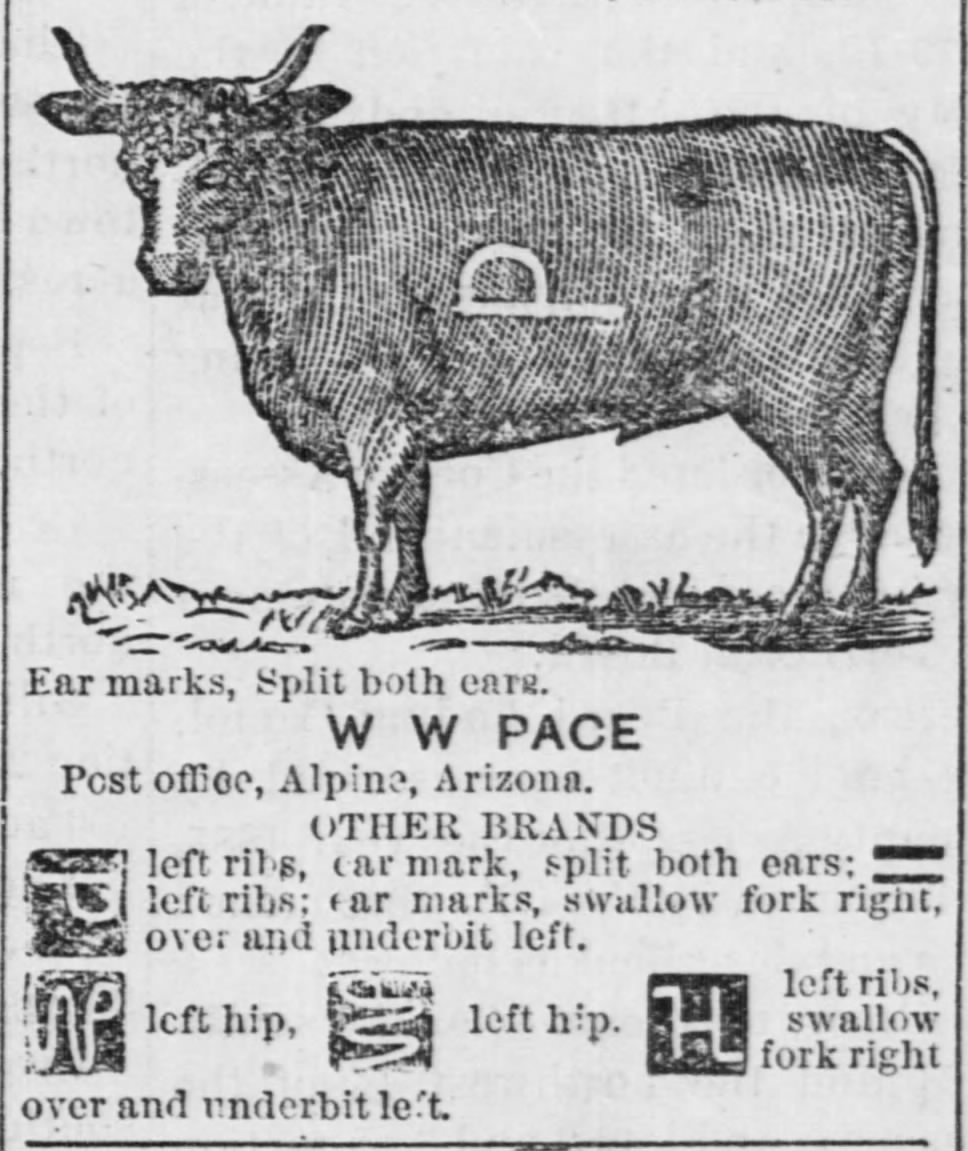
Cattle brand used by W. W. Pace

William W. Pace was born June 8, 1857, in Spanish Fork, Utah, and was later a cattleman in Nutrioso, Arizona. He married Catherine on January 29, 1879, in Salt Lake City, and a year later moved from there to Nutrioso in a wagon train. The couple would have 7 sons and 2 daughters. Catherine's family had immigrated from Scotland in 1860 aboard the sailing ship, The Underwriter, in a voyage which lasted 11 weeks. They immediately headed to Salt Lake City, arriving there on September 2, 1860, and Catherine was born weeks later on September 15. In 1901, Pace and several partners, purchased several mercantile businesses and consolidated them into the Thatcher Implement and Mercantile Co., which flourished. Pace was also part of a group who, in 1907, forming the Co-Operative Ice & Creamery Co., a dairy company serving the Globe, Arizona area. Pace also served on the board of trustees and as vice-president of The Graham County State Bank.

Pace died at his home in Thatcher, Arizona on September 8, 1931. He had been ill for several months.

In 1938, Gila College posthumously dedicated their new home economics building to Pace, using money from a fund set up years earlier.

== Political career ==
In 1898 Pace was nominated as the Democratic nominee for the state House of Representatives. He was elected and served in the 20th Arizona Territorial Legislature. During the legislative session, he authored House Bill Number 71, which was a poll tax, requiring those attempting to vote to be required to pay a tax prior to be allowed to vote. The bill passed. He did not run for re-election to the 21st Arizona Territorial Legislature.

1906 found Pace once again nominated by the Democrats to the territorial legislature, and he was elected in November to the 24th Arizona Territorial Legislature. During this session, Pace introduced a bill in the House which prohibited gambling in the territory. It passed and was signed into law by the Territorial Governor Kibbey on January 31, 1907. In 1908 he was once again nominated to the legislature without opposition, and was re-elected in the general election that November. After the election, he expressed interest in becoming Speaker of the House. However, Sam F. Webb was elected Speaker.

Once the decision was made for Arizona statehood, Pace expressed a desire to run for one of Arizona's seats in the U.S. House of Representatives, stating that he did not desire to try for a state legislative office. In October 1911, however, Pace announced his candidacy for state senator from Graham County, seeking the Democratic nomination. He ran unopposed in the Democrat primary, and he won the general election in December, becoming the first state senator from Graham County. His election made him just one of four legislators to have served in the final territorial legislature, and the first state legislature. The others were Fred S. Breen, Perry Hall, and Kirk T. Moore. He decided not to run for re-election in 1914.

When David H. Claridge, Pace's successor in the senate opted to for state tax commissioner, rather than for re-election to the senate, Pace announced he would once again seek election to the senate from Graham County. He was scheduled to be opposed by W. A. Lines, who was currently serving in the State House of Representatives. However, when the superior court ruled that the state tax commissioner would not be an elected position, Claridge decided to run for the senate, and both Lines and Pace withdrew from the race.
