= Fred Sylvester Breen =

American politician (1869–1932)

Fred Sylvester Breen (March 20, 1869 – February 24, 1932) was an American politician.

== Biography ==
Breen was born to John D. and Lidora M. (Gilmore) Breen on March 20, 1869, in Manteno, Illinois. He was educated in public schools. Breen learned the printing trade at a young age. When he was 18, Breen purchased the Manteno Independent. He moved to Flagstaff, Arizona Territory in 1897. He became United States forest supervisor for northern Arizona in 1898. holding the position until 1908.

Breen purchased The Coconino Sun in April 1908, becoming the paper's editor and publisher, and operated the newspaper until his death. He served as lieutenant colonel in the Arizona national guard.

Breen represented Coconino County in the council (upper house) during the 25th Arizona Territorial Legislature. He served as Arizona state senator 1912–1915. His election made him just one of four legislators to have served in the final territorial legislature, and the first state legislature. The others were William W. Pace, Perry Hall, and Kirk T. Moore. He was reelected to state senate in 1923 during a special election.

Breen married Carolyn E. Austin on June 5, 1906. The couple had no children. Breen's wife died on March 3, 1929.

Breen died in Loma Linda, California on February 24, 1932. He was buried in Citizens Cemetery in Flagstaff.
