= 16th Arizona Territorial Legislature =

Session of the Arizona Territorial Legislature (1891)

←	15th	17th	→

Overview
- Legislative body: Arizona Territorial Legislature
- Jurisdiction: Arizona Territory, United States

Council
- Members: 12
- President: Fred G. Hughes

House of Representatives
- Members: 24
- Speaker: C. S. Clark

The 16th Arizona Territorial Legislative Assembly was a session of the Arizona Territorial Legislature which convened in Phoenix, Arizona. The session began on January 19, 1891.

== Background ==
John N. Irwin had been appointed to replace Lewis Wolfley as Territorial Governor on October 4, 1890. His arrival in the territory had been delayed. First by Irwin taking a brief leave to settle some personal affairs. Then, as soon as his affairs were in order, a member of his family contracted scarlet fever and he was forced to spend a month in medical quarantine. It was not until January 21, 1891, that the new Governor arrived in the territory and was sworn into office.

A statehood movement had developed to correct what was perceived as the "second-class" status experienced by territorial citizens. Politically, the 1890 elections had resulted in the Democrats winning control of both houses of the legislature.

== Legislative session ==
The legislative session began on January 19, 1891.

=== Governor's address ===
The address was given by Acting Governor Oakes Murphy on January 20, 1891. He expressed concern for the territory's financial condition, calling for the legislature to "either reduce expenses of government or increase revenue, to prevent serious financial complications." Murphy then expressed outrage over how common tax avoidance practices were used by territorial residents and estimated total territorial debt at US$3,427,000. The Acting Governor suggested reducing operational costs of the territorial prison "by properly reducing the cost of maintenance, utilizing prison labor, and reduction in the salaries of officers and guards" while he felt the cost of the territorial insane asylum could be offset by better utilization of the facility's farm.

Murphy announced that he had found eleven "lost laws" that had been passed by the 15th Arizona Territorial Legislature before being stored in a desk drawer by Governor C. Meyer Zulick with neither the governor's signature or veto. The Arizona Territorial Supreme court had determined the laws were valid and Murphy planned to publish them unless they were repealed by this session. In other matters, he asked for a bridge to be built near Phoenix over the Salt River, creation of usury laws and restrictions on gambling, and adoption of the secret ballot. To against the Apache outlaws, Murphy asked for a mounted police force be organized. Finally the Acting Governor requested the elimination of fiestas, noting "The Mexicans have little to do with the fiesta of the present day, as they are almost entirely conducted by Americans, and to our shame be it said that the annual exhibitions at the fiestas in the cities of Tucson and Phoenix are outrageous and a disgrace to the Territory. I recommend such legislation as will put an effective stop to these abuses."

=== Legislation ===
Acting upon Acting Governor Murphy's recommendation, the session decided to publish the "lost laws" from the previous session. They then eliminated the territorial offices of Commissioner of Immigration and Territorial Geologist. A new tax of US$30/month was imposed upon gambling tables. Additionally gambling tables were banned from any fair ground, fiesta, park, or race track. The ban had the added benefit of effectively fulfilling Murphy's request to halt the territory's fiestas. The legislature also established the secret ballot during territorial elections.

The session granted an exemption from jury duty to volunteer firefighters and a means of promoting better fire protection. Cattle rustling was discouraged by requiring any cattle sold to be branded and livestock inspections to be performed before the cattle could be shipped. In transportation issues, the maximum railroad fare for railroads was set at $0.06/mile Meanwhile, new railroads were granted a twenty-year tax exemption. To aid in law enforcement, a ranger force was authorized. Additionally a military code was passed that required all male inhabitants of the territory between the ages of 18 and 45 to be available for militia duty in times of need. A new county, Coconino, was created from northern Yavapai County while a section of the Tonto Basin was transferred to Gila County.

Sensing the territory would soon achieve statehood, the session was authorization of a constitutional convention. This was done without the U.S. Congress passing an Enabling act and it was anticipated that having a ratified constitution when the next request for statehood was made would speed the statehood process.

== Aftermath ==
The authorized ranger force would not be organized until 1901. Progress on creation of a constitution came much faster. Governor Irwin issued a proclamation calling for an election of delegates on March 24, 1891, with the convention convening on September 7 the same year. Unusual aspects of the document included provisions for public funding of railroads and water projects and women's suffrage in school elections. It was the document's support for bimetalism however that raised concerns. The proposed constitution was ratified by Arizona voters on December 28, 1891, by a vote of 5,440 to 2,282.

Territorial Delegate Marcus A. Smith submitted an Arizona statehood bills that utilized the proposed constitution in the United States House of Representatives on January 15 and March 14, 1892. The first bill quickly died in committee while the second was passed by the House before being killed in a Senate committee. Senate Republicans at the time not wishing to admit another predominately Democratic state. The proposed constitution met its final fate in 1893. The Democratic party won control of the Senate during the 1892 elections and Smith submitted an updated statehood bill which was passed by the House on December 15, 1893. The newly elected Grover Cleveland administration was composed primary of gold standard advocates and the document's support for bimetallism led to Smith's bill dying in a Senate committee.

== Members ==
House of Representatives
Name	County	Name	County
John B. Allen	Pinal	D. Gough	Graham
C. H. Brinley	Yuma	Frank Hart	Apache
S. M. Burr	Cochise	F. W. Heyne	Cochise
L. H. Chalmers	Maricopa	Gustav A. Hoff	Pima
C. S. Clark (Speaker)	Cochise	J. T. Lesueur	Apache
M. C. Copeland	Mohave	Ransom B. Moore	Gila
J. W. Dougherty	Yavapai	S. C. Mott	Yavapai
Thomas Driscoll	Pima	George Pusch	Pima
Thomas Dunbar	Cochise	Mariano G. Samaniego	Pima
T. E. Farish	Maricopa	C. C. Suter	Pima
J. J. Fisher	Yavapai	J. H. Tevis	Cochise
W. A. Freeze	Yavapai	J. A. Vail	Yavapai

Council
Name	County
Harris Baldwin	Northern District
Peter R. Brady	Southern District
Foster S. Dennis	Mohave
Andrew J. Doran	Pinal
A. Frank	Yuma
J. C. Herndon	Yavapai
Fred G. Hughes (President)	Pima
George T. Peter	Gila
E. J. Simpson	Apache
P. M. Thurmond	Graham
J. V. Vickers	Cochise
C. Meyer Zulick	Maricopa

- The Northern District was composed of Apache, Maricopa, Mohave, Yuma, and Yavapai counties, while the Southern District encompassed Cochise, Gila, Graham, Pima, and Pinal counties.
