= 24th Arizona Territorial Legislature =

Session of the Arizona Territorial Legislature (1907)

←	23rd	25th	→

Overview
- Legislative body: Arizona Territorial Legislature
- Jurisdiction: Arizona Territory, United States

Council
- Members: 12
- President: Andrew J. Doran

House of Representatives
- Members: 24
- Speaker: Neil E. Bailey

The 24th Arizona Territorial Legislative Assembly was a session of the Arizona Territorial Legislature which convened in Phoenix, Arizona. The session ran from January 21, 1907, till March 21, 1907.

== Background ==
A proposal to merge Arizona and New Mexico territories and admit the combined entity as a single state had been made in the United States House of Representatives in 1902. In February 1906, Territorial Delegate Marcus A. Smith managed to attach a provision requiring the voters of both territories to approve the joint statehood proposal. The proposal was rejected by the voters in November 1906.

A recently passed national law limited the amount of free travel that legislators and their friends could obtain. As a result, most members of the session remained in town during the session and worked on legislative issues.

== Legislative session ==
The session began on January 21, 1907, and ran for 60 days. The House was composed of 16 Democrats and 8 Republicans, while the Council contained 8 Republicans and 4 Democrats.

=== Governor's address ===
Governor Kibbey began his address at 10:00 am on January 22, 1907. He used the speech as an opportunity to counter accusations that the territory was not ready for statehood. To strengthen Arizona's bid for statehood, the governor called for "strong morals". Toward this end, Kibbey asked that women and girls be prohibited from employment in establishments that served alcoholic beverages and that legislation allowing for licensing of gambling halls be repealed. The governor also addressed the methods used for appraising mining properties for tax purposes. Toward this end, he said,

Farms, city and town lots, houses, shops and stores, banks, railroads, cattle, sheep, and horses, and all other smaller items of property are assessed at figures which at least approximate equality, and probably at least one-half their value. But the great mines, which produce more wealth and yield greater profits, many times over, than all other classes of property in the territory combined, pay but a small proportion of the taxes – in no event exceeding 8 or 10 per cent of their proper share.

In response to questions about the expense of continuing to operate the Arizona Rangers, Kibbey said the organization "have proved so often their usefulness that it seems impossible to recommend the repeal of the law authorizing the force".

=== Legislation ===
Taxation of territorial mines was the biggest issue of the session. Toward this end, the method used to determine the assessed value of mining properties was set at 25% of the value of the bullion produced by the mine. The mining interests expected that Governor Kibbey would find this assessment value too low and veto the bill. The governor instead signed the bill into law, noting that it increased tax revenues to the territory and was an improvement over the previous situation. While appraised values on mines were still below those imposed on other properties, the change increased the total assessed value of the territory's mines from US$11.5 million to US$20 million.

In an effort to improve the territory's chances to gain statehood, the legislature enacted several acts aimed at improving morality within its borders. Gambling was outlawed and women and children were prohibited from entering into saloons. The session made it illegal to employ females in saloons and other establishments that served alcohol. Licensing fees for saloons ranged from a variable US$12 to $50/year to a flat US$300/year rate. A requirement that any saloon in a railroad town or camp had to have been in operation for a minimum of five months before arrival of the railroad to said location was added. This requirement effectively ended traveling saloons within the territory.

A new territorial prison was authorized in Florence. This was accompanied by a US$120,000 grant to build the new facility on donated land. A territorial sanitary commission was established and the office of public examiner created. The practice of optometry was regulated.

In other matters, the session passed a resolution siding with the San Francisco Board of Education over the U.S. Federal Government in regards to a dispute that had caused Asian students to be segregated from the rest of the city's students. After the resolution received unanimous approval, the Republican majority in the Council reconsidered the matter and reversed their prior approval. Steer tying contests were prohibited. The session also appropriated US$100 to provide a grave marker for Charles Debrille Poston. In the memorandum sent to the United States Congress, the session requested a pay increase for legislators. The request included a note stating that the US$4/day currently received barely covered the cost of the member's hotel expenses. A second memorandum requested US$1 million for construction of a dam near San Carlos, Arizona, to provide water storage and flood control along the Gila River.

== Aftermath ==
Following the construction of a new prison, the last prisoner was moved out of Yuma Territorial Prison in 1910.

== Members ==
House of Representatives
Name	County	Name	County
Neil E. Bailey (Speaker)	Cochise	G. W. Hull	Yavapai
Adolph Ball	Pima	Carl G. Krook	Mohave
W. D. Bell	Maricopa	John B. Martin	Yuma
G. A. Bray	Yavapai	John McCormick	Gila
E. C. Bunch	Maricopa	David Morgan	Pima
D. A. Burke	Yavapai	William J. Morgan	Navajo
J. W. Crenshaw	Maricopa	Owen E. Murphy	Cochise
Roy N. Davidson	Pinal	William W. Pace	Graham
S. E. Day	Apache	John H. Slaughter	Cochise
Anthony V. Grossetta	Pima	William Wallace	Maricopa
Nott E. Guild	Pinal	B. J. Whiteside	Santa Cruz
John R. Hampton	Graham	L. S. Williams	Coconino

Council
Name	County
William G. Blakely	Mohave
J. F. Cleaveland	Graham
E. M. Dickerman	Pima and Santa Cruz
Andrew J. Doran (President)	Yavapai
John T. Hogue	Apache
George W. P. Hunt	Gila
H. C. Lockett	Coconino
Donald McIntyre	Yuma
Eugene B. O'Neill	Maricopa
Stephen Roemer	Cochise
Robert Scott	Navajo
Thomas F. Weedin	Pinal
