= Joseph Fish (Mormon pioneer) =

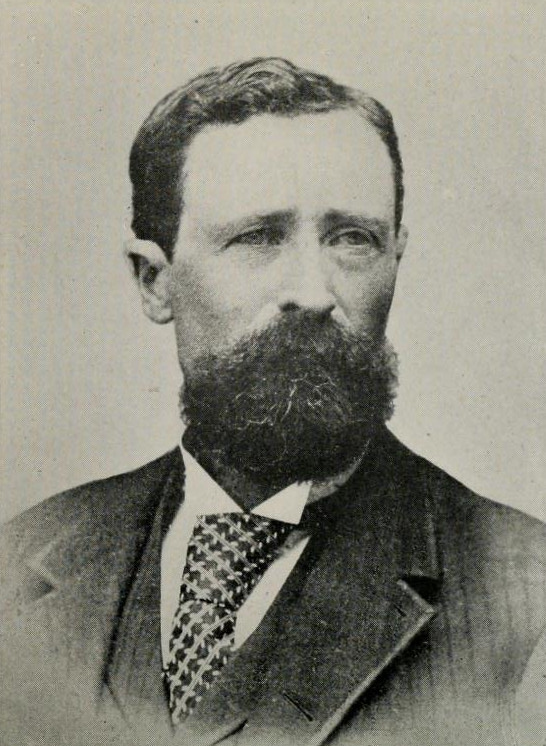
- Born: June 27, 1840; Will County, Illinois
- Died: December 10, 1926 (aged 86); Enterprise, Utah
- Known for: Early settler in Utah and Arizona, member of the Arizona Territorial Legislature

Joseph Fish (1840–1926) was an early settler of Iron City, Utah and Snowflake, Arizona and a member of the Church of Jesus Christ of Latter-day Saints. A book edited by John H. Krinkel, The Life and Times of Joseph Fish, was published about the Mormon pioneer Joseph Fish and his trek to Salt Lake Valley. The book was published by Interstate Printing and Publishers, Inc. and reviewed in the Arizona Republic newspaper in 1971. He was married to four wives in polygamy and had 20 children.

The life and Times of Joseph Fish is a .pdf biography of Fish available to be read online. Compiled by his grandson, the biography includes Fish's own "Autobiography" and a timeline called "Some of the Important Dates Concerning the Life of Joseph Fish." The timeline shows that on April 17 (27), 1770 Joseph Fish (his grandfather) was born at Pepperell, Massachusetts and that on March 24, 1770 Sarah (Sally) Spear (his grandmother) was born at Walpole, New Hampshire. Joseph Fish and Sarah Spear were married at Redding (Reading) Vermont on January 5, 1793, and several years later they moved north in search of a new home.

Fish's grandparents are said to have been the first settlers of Stanstead County Quebec. "They did not know that they were in Canada until the survey was made after they had settled there." Later entries on the timeline show that Horace Fish, Joseph Fish's father, was born at Hatley, Quebec, and on December 26, 1805 Hannah Leavitt, his mother, was born at Walpole, New Hampshire or St. Johnsbury, Vermont. On March 18, 1824, Horace Fish and Hannah Leavitt were married in Quebec, and on July 20, 1837 "most of the large family of Leavitts and their connections, including Horace Fish and family, left Stanstead County, Quebec, to join the Mormons. Horace Fish stopped at "the Grove" twelve miles from Joliet, Illinois for three years."

Joseph Fish was born June 27, 1840 at "The Grove" in Will Co., Illinois. In September 1840 the Fish family moved to Nauvoo, Illinois. Horace Fish worked on the Temple there, and on May 23, 1846. Horace Fish and family crossed the Mississippi River into Iowa.
