= Joseph Henry Kibbey =

American politician and jurist (1853–1924)

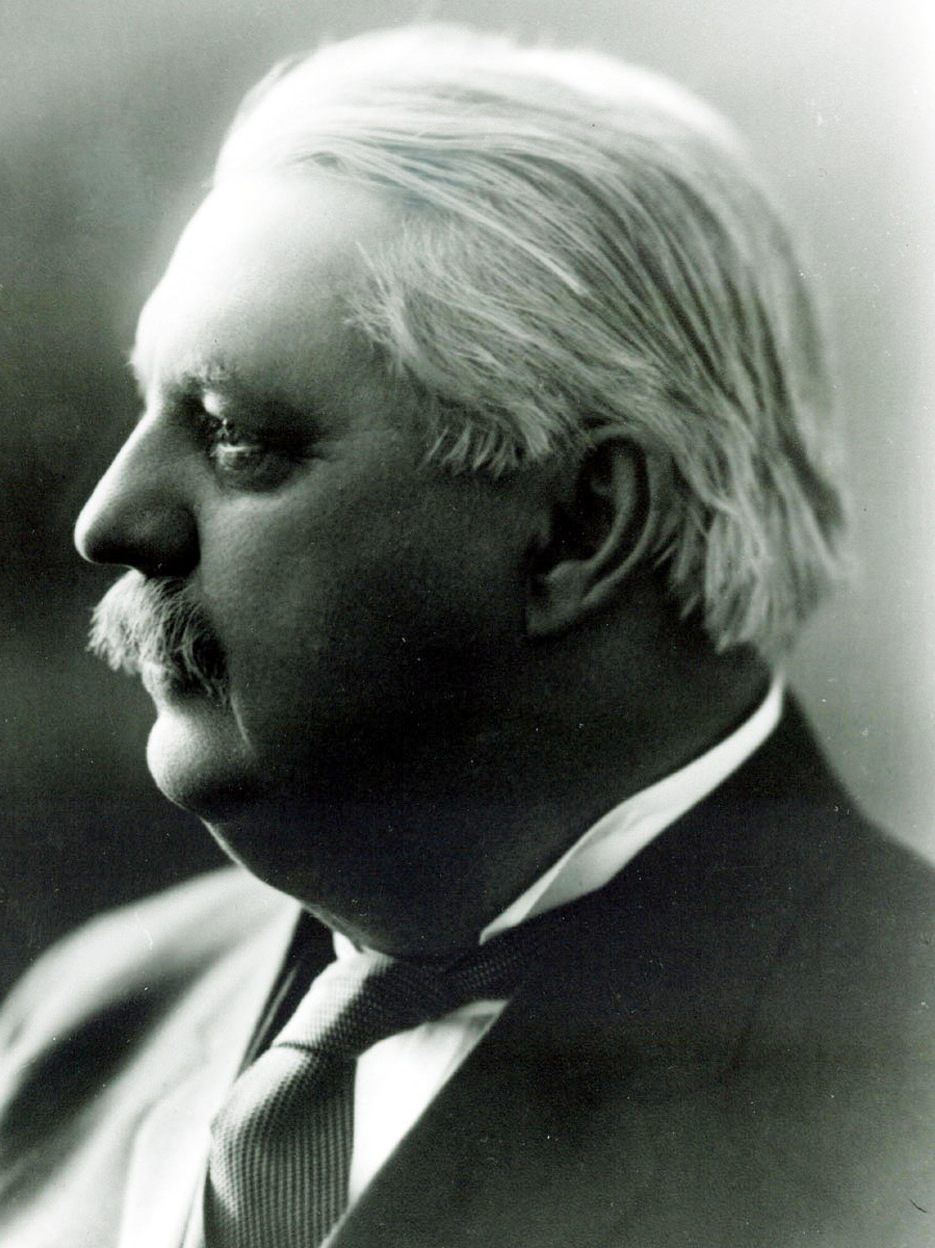
- Joseph H. Kibbey (c. 1913)

16th Territorial Governor of Arizona
- In office March 7, 1905 – May 1, 1909
- Nominated by: Theodore Roosevelt
- Preceded by: Alexander Oswald Brodie
- Succeeded by: Richard Elihu Sloan

Associate Justice, Arizona Territorial Supreme Court
- In office August 1889 – May 2, 1893
- Nominated by: Benjamin Harrison
- Preceded by: William Wood Porter
- Succeeded by: Owen Thomas Rouse

Personal details
- Born: March 4, 1853 Centerville, Indiana
- Died: June 14, 1924 (aged 71) Phoenix, Arizona
- Party: Republican
- Spouse: Nora Burbank
- Education: Earlham College
- Profession: Attorney

Joseph Henry Kibbey (March 4, 1853 – June 14, 1924) was an American attorney who served as Associate Justice of the Arizona Territorial Supreme Court from 1889 to 1893 and Governor of Arizona Territory from 1905 to 1909. His legal career is most remembered for his efforts in the area of water law, his key legal contributions being the "Kibbey Decision", a legal ruling establishing the principle that "water belongs to the land", and creation of the legal framework for the Salt River Valley Water User's Association, a model for federal water projects in the American West. As governor, Kibbey was a leader in the effort to prevent Arizona and New Mexico territories from being combined into a single U.S. state.

== Early life ==
Kibbey was born on March 4, 1853, in Centerville, Indiana to Caroline (Cunningham) and John F. Kibbey. His father was an attorney who had been in a legal partnership with Indiana Governor Oliver P. Morton and served as Indiana Attorney General from March to November 1862. After military service in the American Civil War, the elder Kibbey worked as a trial judge until 1885. The younger Kibbey was educated in public schools before enrolling at Earlham College.

After graduation, Kibbey taught school in Arkansas for a year and clerked at a store before he began reading law at his father's law firm in Richmond, Indiana. He was admitted to the bar in 1875 and spent the next thirteen years practicing law at his father's firm. In 1883 he added a term as city attorney to his duties.

Kibbey married Nora Burbank, the daughter of Dakota Territory Governor John A. Burbank, on January 10, 1877. John A. Burbank was the brother-in-law of Oliver P. Morton. The marriage produced two children: Walter and Anna.

== Associate Justice ==
Health concerns prompted Kibbey to move to Florence, Arizona Territory, in 1888. There he worked as secretary and attorney of the Florence Canal Company, which was owned by a family friend. For the remainder of his career, Kibbey specialized in corporate and water law.

In 1889, newly elected President Benjamin Harrison implemented a policy of only appointing residents of the territory to positions in territorial government. While Kibbey was newly arrived in the territory, his family connections were enough to secure his appointment to the bench. His father's influence can be seen in a telegram to Harrison, preserved by the National Archives and Records Administration, stating that "Joe prefers the District in which he lives – that is Judge Porter's District." Kibbey was nominated by Harrison to become an Associate Justice of Arizona Territorial Supreme Court on August 5, 1889. He convened court on August 19. He was assigned the second district, composed of Pinal, Graham, and Gila counties.

During his time as a judge, Kibbey was well respected and gained a reputation for being the least overturned judge to sit on the Arizona bench. He wrote nineteen opinions during his term, dealing with a wide variety of topics. Santa Rita Land and Mining Company v. Mercer, 3 Arizona 181 (1890) determined that the territorial appellate courts would not hear issues not previously raised during trial in a district court. Putnam v. Putnam, 3 Arizona 195 (1890), Tietjen v. Sneed, 3 Arizona 195 (1890), and Wores v. Preston, 4 Arizona 92 (1893) dealt with other procedural issues. Yavapai County v. O'Neill, 3 Arizona 363 (1892) and Behan v. Davis', 3 Arizona 399 (1892) both involved pay disputes. The former dealt with Sheriff Buckey O'Neill's right to be paid for expenses incurred in the pursuit of his duties, while the latter dealt with a salary dispute between Superintendent Johnny Behan and the commissioners of the Yuma Territorial Prison. Kibbey's ruling in Don Yan v. Ah You, 4 Arizona 109 (1893) set an early Arizona precedent in the field of wrongful death claims.

Kibbey's most renowned ruling came when he was assigned to Phoenix, where he heard Wormser et al v. Salt River Canal Company, Case No. 708 (1892), Federal District Court for Arizona, 3d Judicial District. The case involved a dispute in which the canal company was accused of treating water from the Salt River as corporate property and delivering it in times of drought to customers with ownership interest in the company in preference to customers who had historically used the water. The ruling, which became known as the "Kibbey Decision," established the principle that "water belongs to the land" and could not be used as "floating" property to be divided by decision of the canal company. Water rights were thus linked to the various parcels of land where the water was used and not to the owner of land. The role of the canal company likewise became that of a simple delivery agent and water was allocated to the various tracts of land based upon the principle of prior appropriation. The decision was not appealed, and the canal companies instead attempted to ignore the court decision. The Kibbey Decision was later upheld by Arizona Territorial Supreme Court in Slosser v. Salt River Canal Company (1901), 7 Arizona 376 and Thomas Brockman v. The Great Canal Company (1904), 8 Arizona 451.

During his time on the bench Kibbey developed a small number of detractors who, as was common for the day, mounted an effort to have the judge removed from the bench. However, the effort failed to gain significant traction. It was instead the inauguration of President Grover Cleveland that led to the judge's removal. His successor, Owen Thomas Rouse, took his oath of office on May 2, 1893. For the rest of his life Kibbey preferred to be addressed by the title "judge," feeling that presiding over a courthouse was a more prestigious position than even his later role as governor.

== Phoenix ==
After leaving the bench, Kibbey moved to Phoenix and established a private legal practice. Many of his clients were "old-righters" who believed their water rights had been wrongly taken from them by the local canal companies. During this period the former judge argued a number of cases before the Arizona Territorial Supreme Court. Among the more important were Slosser v. Salt River Canal Company (1901), 7 Arizona 376 and Gould v. Maricopa Canal Company (1904), 8 Arizona 429.

In addition to his legal practice, Kibbey became politically active. He was elected Phoenix City Attorney in November 1897. This was followed by a later appointment as Assistant District Attorney for Maricopa County. Within the Republican Party, Kibbey was a two-time chairman of the Maricopa County organization and a three time chairman of the territorial central committee. In 1902 he was elected to the 22nd Arizona Territorial Legislature, where he served as minority leader in the upper house. Kibbey was also a delegate to the 1904 Republican National Convention.

While living in Arizona Territory, Kibbey had seen devastating floods separated by prolonged droughts. An example of this was the February 1891 Salt River flood, which washed out the railroad bridge at Tempe and caused damage in Phoenix as far north as Jefferson Street. This was followed by a drought that killed livestock, forced a third of the farmland in the Salt River valley out of cultivation, and caused many residents in the area to abandon their homes. To control flood waters and provide water in times of drought, construction of a storage dam was proposed on the Salt River and a suitable site located as early as 1889. There was, however, no source within the territory capable of financing the estimated US$2–5 million construction cost. This situation changed on June 17, 1902, with passage of the Newlands Reclamation Act. However, the act required a party of the second part capable of repaying loaned monies and there was no precedent for how such parties were to be organized. To address this requirement, Kibbey helped found the Salt River Valley Water User's Association. As the Association's attorney, it fell to him to write the group's Articles of Incorporation. The articles Kibbey created not only met the legal requirements of the Newlands Reclamation Act but balanced the interests of the Salt River Valley's existing and future residents. The articles and the user's association were so successful that they served as a model for future federal water projects.

== Governorship ==
Governor Alexander Oswald Brodie appointed Kibbey Attorney General for Arizona Territory on November 19, 1904. He did not hold the position long, as two months later Brodie announced his resignation. Territorial Secretary William F. Nichols was initially considered as a replacement, but Nichols instead recommended Kibbey be appointed governor. President Theodore Roosevelt appointed Kibbey governor of Arizona Territory on February 27, 1905, and he took the oath of office on March 7.

When Kibbey entered office, the biggest issue facing Arizona Territory was a proposal to recombine Arizona with New Mexico Territory and admit the combined political unit as a single state. Despite President Roosevelt's support of the proposal, Kibbey swiftly proclaimed his opposition, noting the widespread disapproval of the plan by the citizens of Arizona. The newly sworn in governor also threatened to resign over the joint-statehood proposal. As the 23rd Arizona Territorial Legislature was in session when he came into office, Kibbey asked the legislature to authorize a special election asking the territory's voters to weigh in on the proposal, but no such election was authorized. When Representative Edward L. Hamilton of Michigan introduced a bill to enact the proposal, the governor then joined with other territorial leaders in lobbying against the joint-statehood bill in the U.S. Congress. The lobbying gained a number of supporters who were able to delay passage of the bill and then insert an amendment calling for a referendum by the voters of both Arizona and New Mexico asking, "Shall Arizona and New Mexico be united to form one State?". The proposal died in November 1906 when New Mexico voters approved the proposal by a vote of 26,195 to 14,735 but Arizona voters rejected it by a vote of 3,141 to 16,265.

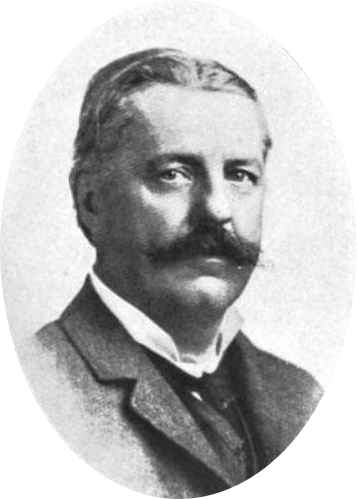
Governor Joseph H. Kibbey

While Kibbey was generally a supporter of the mining industry, he felt the territory's mines were not paying their fair share in taxes. Proclaiming "To pay proper taxes is a duty", the governor sought to remedy this situation. His first effort was an attempt to have the assessed value of the mines increased for property taxes. He was unsuccessful in this effort until August 1905, when he asked for the resignation of A. F. Donau from the territorial board of equalization. The day after Donau resigned, a previously unsuccessful proposal to raise the assessed values of the territory's mines from US$4 million to US$14 million was passed. Then during his address to the 24th Arizona Territorial Legislature, Kibbey renewed his call for higher taxes. In the address he noted that while the mines had assessed values of between 3 and 5% of their real values, all other taxed property, with the exception of the railroads, were assessed at 40 to 70% of their real value. During the legislative session, mining interests used their influence to have a bill passed that set the assessed property value for a mine at 25% of the value of the bullion produced by the mine. The mining interests expected that Kibbey would find this assessment value too low and veto the bill. Kibbey instead signed the bill into law, noting it increased tax revenues to the territory and was an improvement over the previous situation.

In other matters covered in his address to the 24th legislature, Kibbey called for restrictions on the sale of tobacco and liquor, a prohibition on gambling, limitation of hours of operation for saloons, and a ban on women and girls' working in saloons. These proposals were made primarily as a means of raising the territory's perceived moral situation as part of efforts to gain statehood. During his address to the 25th Arizona Territorial Legislature, Kibbey expressed confidence that Arizona would soon be granted statehood and left further increases in mine taxation to the state legislature. He instead urged creation of a railroad commission in an effort to build a more efficient transportation system.

The 25th legislature proved to be highly partisan, with the Democratic-controlled session opposing many of their Republican governor's efforts. The session overrode vetoes to bills eliminating the position of Territorial Examiner and creating a literacy test for all Arizona voters. Another veto override abolished the Arizona Rangers. In their place, each county sheriff was authorized a limited number of "ranger deputies". The final key veto override involved a bill authorizing territorial schools to segregate "African" students.

President Roosevelt renominated Kibbey for a second term on December 16, 1908. Mining interests and other political opponents delayed confirmation until after Roosevelt left office. When President William Howard Taft took office, he decided to appoint Richard Elihu Sloan and as a result Kibbey left office on May 1, 1909. On his last day in office, territorial employees presented the outgoing governor with a set of cut-glass drinkware, a 254-piece service of silverware, a cherry chest inscribed with his initials, and a gold watch as tokens of their appreciation.

== Later life ==
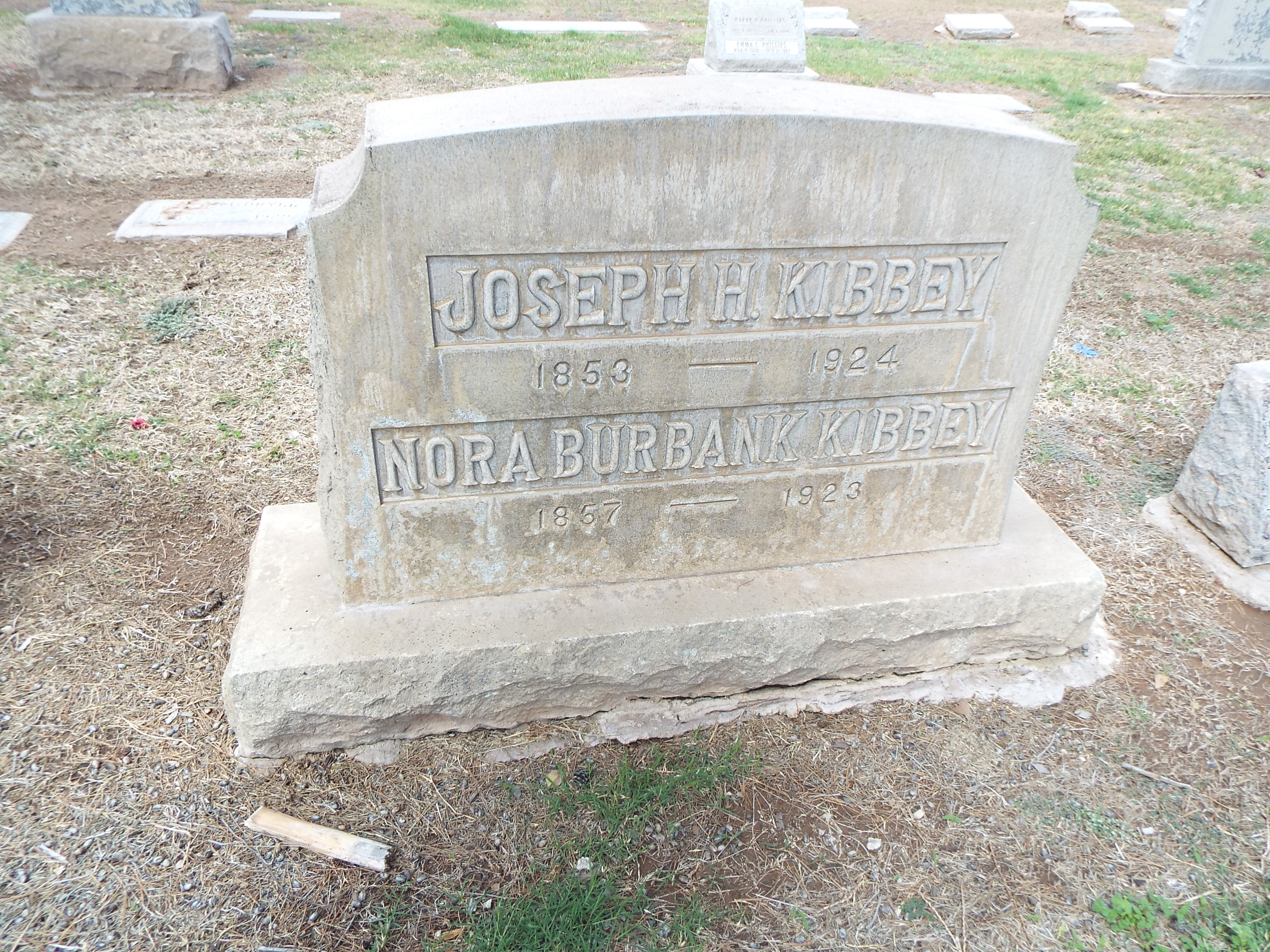
Grave-site of Joseph H. Kibbey (1853–1924) and Nora Burbank Kibbey (1867–1923).

After leaving office, Kibbey returned to his private legal practice and also served as counsel for the Salt River Valley Water User's Association. Among the cases he handled was a challenge to the school segregation law he had vetoed. During the initial trial, Kibbey won a partial injunction when the district court ruled the law created a danger to school children forced to cross railroad tracks to reach a new segregated school. By the time the appeal was heard, Arizona had achieved statehood and the Arizona Supreme Court upheld the legality of the school segregation law in Dameron v. Bayless (1912), 14 Arizona 180.

Upset over President Taft's actions during Arizona's efforts to gain statehood, Kibbey split from the Republicans and supported the Bull Moose Party during the 1912 elections. In 1916 the former governor was the Republican nominee for the U.S. Senate. Kibbey lost his election bid to incumbent Henry Fountain Ashurst.

During his later years, Kibbey decided the automobile was firmly established and that he should learn to drive. After taking lessons, he found that he tended to lose control of the vehicle when operating it at the higher speed afforded by third gear. Consequently, he restricted himself to driving in either first or second gear for the rest of his life. Kibbey died in Phoenix on June 14, 1924. He was buried at Greenwood/Memory Lawn Mortuary & Cemetery. He is the namesake for Kibbey Butte which is located in the Grand Canyon.

Party political offices
Preceded by Ralph H. Cameron	Republican nominee for U.S. Senator from Arizona (Class 1); 1916	Succeeded by James Harvey McClintock
