= Mose Drachman =

American politician in Arizona

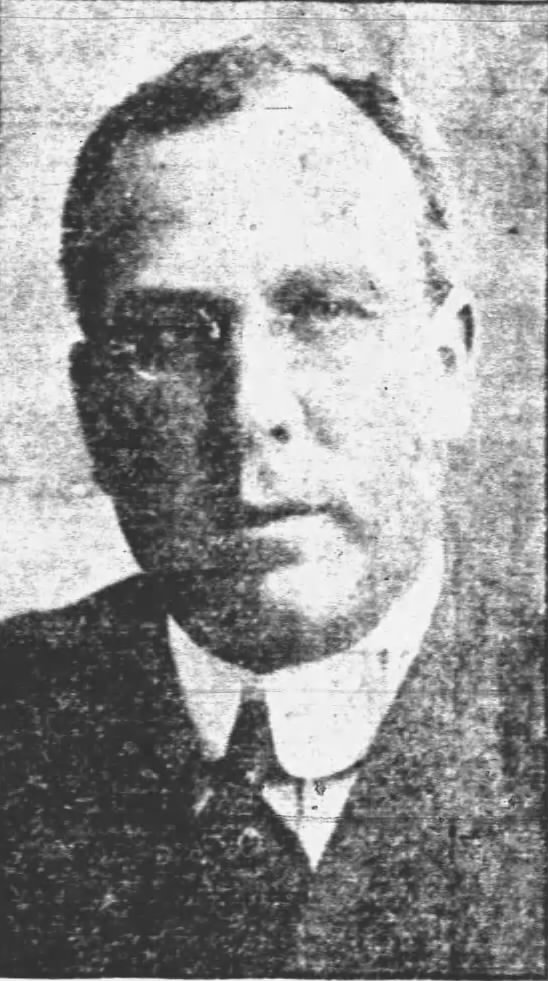
- Drachman ca. 1914

Member of the Arizona Senate from the Pima County district
- In office January 1915 – January 1917
- Preceded by: John T. Hughes; A. A. Worsley
- Succeeded by: J. W. Buchanan; F. O. Goodell

Personal details
- Party: Democratic
- Profession: Politician

Mose Drachman was a pioneer business and civic leader, as well as politician, in Tucson, Arizona, during the early 1900s. He was involved in numerous interests, including mercantile, real estate, banking, mining, and cattle. He served as the Senior Clerk for the U.S. District Court in Arizona during the term of William H. Sawtelle, served two terms on the Tucson City Council, and five consecutive terms on the Tucson Board of Education, as well as being on both the Tucson and Phoenix chambers of commerce. He also served a single term in the Arizona state senate during the 2nd Arizona State Legislature. Two books were written about his life, Ridin' the Rainbow, and Chicken Every Sunday, the latter being made into a Broadway play, as well as a motion picture of the same name.

== Personal life ==
Drachman's parents lived in Tucson, Arizona, however he was born in San Francisco, California on November 16, 1870, while they were visiting there. Drachman's eldest brother, Harry Arizona Drachman, had been the first white male child born in Tucson. Harry would also serve in the Arizona State Senate, during the 6th Arizona State Legislature. His parents, Philip and Rosa Drachman, both immigrated from Poland, Philip in 1863 and Rosa in 1868, traveling to Tucson by way of the Panama isthmus and San Francisco. Of the 10 Drachman children, only Mose was not born in Tucson. Drachman's uncle, Samuel Drachman, who moved to Tucson in 1858, also served in the territorial legislature, in the House of Representatives during the 8th Arizona Territorial Legislature.

Drachman attended elementary school in Tucson in a school located at East Congress and Scott Streets, but left school at the age of 9 to sell newspapers. In the early 1890s, he served as the deputy sheriff of Pima County. In the 1890s, he was the player manager of the Tucson baseball team. Drachman served as a second lieutenant in the Tucson militia, in Company D.

Drachman married Ethel Edmunds, of Phoenix, in December 1897 in Long Beach, California. The couple had three children, a girl, Rosemary, and two boys, Oliver and Philip. Drachman was a 33rd degree mason, and had served on Tucson's Chamber of Commerce, as well as being a member of the Arizona Pioneers Historical Society, at one time serving as its president. He was a considered an authority on Arizona history. Drachman died on October 2, 1935, from a heart attack at his home in Tucson. He had not been feeling well for approximately a week prior to his death. At the time of his death, he was working on his memoirs, which included a plethora of information on the early pioneer period in Tucson.

== Business career ==
In late 1894, Drachman and a partner, Fred Holmes, left Tucson and traveled to Mexico City, where they hoped to begin a bicycle business. While the business was successful, Drachman was negatively affected by the climate and abandoned the business, returning to Tucson in May 1895. After his return, he accepted a position as the manager of the grocery department of L. Zeckendorf & Co. In March 1896 Drachman moved to Phoenix, and took over the newly opened branch of a mercantile company, and became the Arizona Territory representative for the Arbuckle Coffee Co. In 1899, the Arbuckle company added New Mexico to Drachman's territory. In June 1898 he was elected the secretary of the Phoenix Chamber of Commerce.

1901 saw Drachman return to live in Tucson. In early 1902 Drachman considered opening a new transportation company in Tucson. However, he instead took the position of manager for the existing Tucson Street Railway, extending their service and upgrading their fleet of vehicles. Drachman purchased the company in June 1905 for $14,000. He also opened a new steam laundry in Tucson, incorporating the Troy Laundry Company, which also opened up a location in Nogales. He sold the business for $12,000 in September 1903. He remained a partner in the steam laundry until his death in 1935.

In 1906 Drachman and two partners incorporated the Tucson Development Company, for the purpose of developing mines and mineral properties. The company purchased the Gold Boulder and Red Rock Mines in the Oro Blanco district near Globe. He was also involved in the cattle industry, being involved with both the Zepeda and Rondstadt cattle enterprises, in both Arizona and Sonora, Mexico.

Drachman was also an active investor in Tucson real estate, beginning in the early 1900s. Around 1900 he held the first large auction of a real estate property sub-division in Tucson. By 1910, real estate was the primary business of Drachman, and he was considered one of the most prominent realtors in Tucson. Had he various partners in his real estate ventures, including William H. Sawtelle and his brothers, Harry, Emmanuel, and Albert. In 1916, Drachman sold his real estate business to Triggs & Ellis.

In March 1912, Drachman was one of several businessmen to incorporate and open the Arizona State Bank. The bank's major purpose was to provide larger loans to promote development in Arizona. In 1919 the Arizona National Bank of Tucson purchased the National Bank of Arizona, with Drachman being in charge of both locations. Also in 1919, Governor Thomas Edward Campbell appointed Drachman as a regent to the University of Arizona. He served the four years during which Campbell was in office, however when Hunt was re-elected in 1924, he replaced several regents who were not Hunt supporters, including Drachman. In 1913, when The Arizona National Bank of Tucson was organized, Drachman was made a vice-president and director. This would later merge with the Consolidated Bank, which in turn merged with The Valley Bank and Trust to form the Valley National Bank of Arizona.

== Political career ==
In 1896 Drachman was named to the Arizona Territory's Board of Equalization. In 1905, he was the Democrat's nominee for the city council seat in the first ward of Tucson. He won by a slim 25 votes over his Republican opponent. Drachman ran for re-election to the Tucson council in 1907, but lost to Republican J. B. Martin. In 1908, Drachman was nominated by both the Democrats and the Republicans for the city council, winning the general election in December and returning to the seat in the first ward.

In May 1912 Governor Hunt appointed Drachman as Arizona's commissioner to the Panama–Pacific International Exposition which was to be held in San Francisco in 1915. In July 1914, Drachman announced his intention to run for the state senate seat from Pima County. Incumbent A. A. Worsley had announced that he would not be running for re-election, while the other incumbent John T. Hughes was running. Besides Hughes and Drachman, there were two other Democrats vying for the two nominations: R. N. Leatherwood and Andrew P. Martin. However, Hughes dropped out of the race in mid-August. Drachman and Martin won the two Democrat nominations, and were easy winners in the November general election.

In March 1916, Drachman was appointed as clerk of the United States District Court. His appointment precluded him from running for re-election to the state senate. He resigned the post in November 1919. In 1918, Drachman was on the Tucson Board of Freeholders, and was one of the men responsible for drafting the city's charter that year. In 1920 he was elected to the Tucson Board of Education, where he served 5 consecutive 3-year terms. During his tenure he served as both its president and secretary. His final term ending with his death.

== Legacy ==
Drachman Street in Tucson is named after the family.

His daughter, Rosemary Drachman Taylor, wrote the best-selling novel, Chicken Every Sunday in 1943. The book was an autobiographical look at the Mose Drachman family during the early 1900s, and was compared to Life With Father. The book was adapted as a play by Julius and Philip G. Epstein in 1944 under the same name. The play ran for 9 months on Broadway from April 1944 to January 1945. The book was further adapted into a film of the same name in 1949 starring Dan Dailey and Celeste Holm. The film had its world premiere in Tucson, at the Fox Theater on February 12, 1949.

Taylor's second book, Ridin' the Rainbow, also a best-seller, was also about her father, but focused more on his business dealings in early Tucson. The working title of the novel was The Town's Coming This Way, which was an expression her father used whenever he brought a large tract of undeveloped property.
