= Harry Saxon =

Arizona rancher and politician

Member of the Arizona House of Representatives from the Santa Cruz County district
- In office March 1912 – December 1914
- Succeeded by: Richard Farrell

Personal details
- Born: July 24, 1882 San Gabriel, California, US
- Died: August 11, 1964 (aged 82)
- Party: Democratic
- Profession: Politician, rancher

Harry Saxon was a rancher and politician from Arizona. He served several terms as the sheriff of Santa Cruz County, Arizona, was mayor of Willcox, and was a representative in the Arizona State Legislature during the 1st Arizona State Legislature. In 1890 his widowed mother moved to Calabasas. In 1903 he became a "line rider", a mounted customs inspector. In 1906 he was elected sheriff of Santa Cruz County.

During World War I, he served in the United States Cavalry. In 1926, he became a partner in the Three Links Cattle Co., and managed its operations until 1941, when it was sold.
