= H. R. Wood =

American politician in Arizona

- Wood in 1949

Member of the Arizona Senate from the Yavapai County district
- In office March 1912 – January 1915
- Preceded by: First Senator from Yavapai County
- Succeeded by: Morris Goldwater; Frances Munds

Personal details
- Born: Michigan
- Died: June 17, 1952 Prescott, Arizona
- Party: Democratic
- Profession: Politician

Homer R. Wood was a politician from Arizona who served in the 1st Arizona State Legislature.

Wood was originally from Michigan. He moved to Prescott, Arizona in 1891, and established a drug store. He was also active in the mining field, and was one of the people responsible for the development of the Hillside Mine. By the early 1900s, he and two partners had opened a mining investment firm, Wood, Dillon & Co.

In 1910 he was one of six Democrats selected to run for the positions as delegates to the state's constitutional convention. In the general election Wood was one of the five Democrats, along with a lone Republican selected to represent Yavapai County at the convention. He was one of the signers of the Constitution of Arizona.

Along with M. G. Cunniff, he was one of the two Democrats elected in the October 1911 primary to run for the state Senate. Both Wood and Cunniff won in December's general election, to become the first state senators from Yavapai County. During the first legislature, Wood served on six senate committees: Finance; Judiciary; Mines and Mining; Appropriations; Constitutional Mandates; and State Accounting and Methods of Business.

For over 50 years, starting in 1897, Wood was the official timekeeper for Prescott's "Frontier Days", billed as the "World's Oldest Rodeo".

Wood died in his home in Prescott on June 17, 1952.
