= Senator Worsley =

Senator Worsley may refer to:

- A. A. Worsley (1869–1927), Arizona State Senate
- Bob Worsley (born 1956), Arizona State Senate
