= 2nd Arizona State Legislature =

1915–1916 session of the Arizona Legislature

←	1st	3rd	→
- Arizona State Capitol (2014)

Overview
- Legislative body: Arizona State Legislature
- Jurisdiction: Arizona, United States
- Term: January 1, 1915 – December 31, 1916

Senate
- Members: 19
- President: W. P. Sims
- Party control: Democrat 18-1

House of Representatives
- Members: 35
- Speaker: William E. Brooks
- Party control: Democrat 35-0

Sessions
- 1st: January 11 – March 11, 1915

Special sessions
- 1st: April 23 – May 29, 1915
- 2nd: June 1 – June 28, 1915

The 2nd Arizona State Legislature, consisting of the Arizona State Senate and the Arizona House of Representatives, was constituted from January 1, 1915, to December 31, 1916, during the second term of George W. P. Hunt as governor of Arizona, in Phoenix. The number of senators and representatives remained constant, at 19 and 35 respectively. The Democrats increased their lead in both houses, winning 18 of the 19 senate seats, and winning a clean sweep of the house, 35–0.

== Sessions ==
The Legislature met for the regular session at the State Capitol in Phoenix on January 11, 1915; and adjourned on March 11.

A special session was called by the governor, and met between April 23 – May 29, 1915. A second special session was invoked from June 1–28, 1915.

== State Senate ==
=== Members ===
The asterisk (*) denotes members of the previous Legislature who continued in office as members of this Legislature.

County	Senator	Party	Notes
Apache	Fred Colter	Democrat	
Cochise	William M. Riggs	Democrat	
Cochise	W. P. Sims*	Democrat	
Coconino	Hugh E. Campbell	Democrat	
Gila	John E. Bacon	Democrat	
Gila	Alfred Kinney*	Democrat	
Graham	David H. Claridge	Democrat	
Greenlee	George H. Chase*	Democrat	
Maricopa	O. S. Stapley	Democrat	
Maricopa	Sam F. Webb	Democrat	
Mohave	Henry Lovin*	Democrat	
Navajo	D. D. Crabb	Republican	
Pima	Mose Drachman	Democrat	
Pima	A. P. Martin	Democrat	
Pinal	Charles E. MacMillin	Democrat	
Santa Cruz	Harry J. Karns	Democrat	
Yavapai	Morris Goldwater	Democrat	
Yavapai	Frances Munds	Democrat	First woman Arizona State Senator
Yuma	J. S. Garvin	Democrat	

== House of Representatives ==
=== Members ===
The asterisk (*) denotes members of the previous Legislature who continued in office as members of this Legislature.

County	Representative	Party	Notes
Apache	Rachel Berry	Democrat	First woman representative
Cochise	Sam P. Briscoe	Democrat	
Cochise	William L. Cook	Democrat	
Cochise	Oscar Doyle	Democrat	
Cochise	Charles T. Francis	Democrat	
Cochise	W. J. Graham*	Democrat	
Cochise	J. S. Merrill	Democrat	
Cochise	John E. Newbury	Democrat	
Coconino	William Marlar	Democrat	
Gila	B.F. Baker	Democrat	
Gila	William E. Brooks*	Democrat	
Gila	W. D. Claypool	Democrat	
Graham	J. D. Lee	Democrat	
Graham	Joseph H. Lines	Democrat	
Greenlee	John Christy	Democrat	
Greenlee	Sam F. Lanford	Democrat	
Maricopa	Guy D. Acuff	Democrat	
Maricopa	A. G. Austin	Democrat	
Maricopa	J. C. Goodwin	Democrat	
Maricopa	J. E. McLain	Democrat	
Maricopa	T. T. Powers	Democrat	
Maricopa	Loren F. Vaughn	Democrat	
Mohave	W. P. Mahoney	Democrat	
Navajo	Sam W. Proctor	Democrat	
Pima	J. W. Buchanan*	Democrat	
Pima	Sheldon A. Reed	Democrat	
Pima	J. Breck Richardson	Democrat	
Pinal	Frank Pinkley	Democrat	
Santa Cruz	Richard Farrell	Democrat	
Yavapai	A. A. Johns	Democrat	
Yavapai	J. E. Leeper	Democrat	
Yavapai	O. F. Orthel	Democrat	
Yavapai	John J. Sweeney	Democrat	
Yuma	James L. Edwards	Democrat	
Yuma	J. B. Flanagan	Democrat	

== See also ==
- List of Arizona state legislatures
