= Senator Parr =

Senator Parr may refer to:

- Archie Parr (1860–1942), Texas State Senate
- Edmund Parr (1849–1925), Virginia State Senate
- W. A. Parr (1855–1922), Arizona State Senate
