= Senator Garvin =

Senator Garvin may refer to:

- James S. Garvin (1873–1945), Arizona State Senate
- Jessica Garvin (fl. 2020s), Oklahoma State Senate
- Lucius F. C. Garvin (1841–1922), Rhode Island Senate
