= Philip Drachman =

Arizona pioneer, businessman, and politician

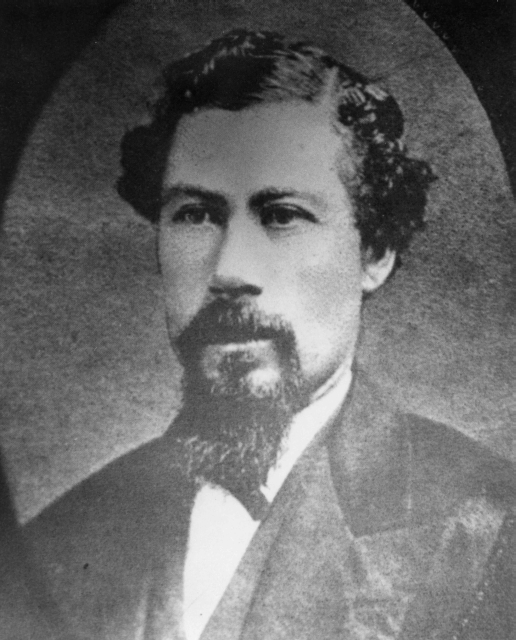
- Born: 1833; Poland
- Died: 1889 (aged 55–56); Tucson, Arizona
- Occupations: Businessman, politician
- Office: Arizona Territory House of Representatives
- Term: 1867
- Spouse: Rosa
- Children: Harry Arizona; Mose; Emmanuel; Albert; Lily; Becky; Esther; Phyllis
- Family: Samuel, brother

Philip Drachman (1833-1889) was an Arizona pioneer, businessman, and politician.

Drachman was born in Poland in 1833 and immigrated to the United States in 1852 with his family, including his brother Samuel. Drachman then moved to Tucson, Arizona in 1866, where he partnered with Isaac Goldberg and started the Drachman-Goldberg general store. Drachman's other business interests included a saloon, a freight line between Tucson and Yuma, real estate and a cigar store. Drachman served in the Arizona Territory's 4th Arizona Territorial Legislature, in the House of Representatives, as one of the three representatives from Pima County. His brother, Samuel, who followed Philip to Tucson in 1867, also served in the territorial legislature, in the House of Representatives during the 8th Arizona Territorial Legislature.

He married Rosa Katzenstein from New York City in 1868. They had 10 children, 6 daughters and 4 sons. His first child and eldest son was Harry Arizona Drachman, and was the first white male child born in Tucson. Another son, Mose Drachman was an influential Tucson businessman and served in the Arizona State Senate during the 2nd Arizona State Legislature. His grandson, Roy Drachman, through another son, Emmanuel, was a very influential businessman and real estate developer in Tucson during the mid-1900s.

Philip Drachman died of pneumonia in Tucson in 1889.
