= John H. Willis =

John H. Willis may refer to:

- John H. Willis (politician), Arizona politician, member of the 1st Arizona State Legislature.
- John Harlan Willis (1921–1945), Congressional Medal of Honor recipient
