= Senator Crabb =

Senator Crabb may refer to:

- D. D. Crabb, a state senator from Arizona, United States
- Henry A. Crabb, a state senator from California, United States
