= Senator Wills =

Senator Wills may refer to:

- Thomas N. Wills (1866–1940), Arizona State Senate
- William Henry Wills (politician) (1882–1946), Vermont State Senate

== See also ==
- Senator Willis (disambiguation)
