= Andrew P. Martin =

American politician from Arizona

A. P. Martin
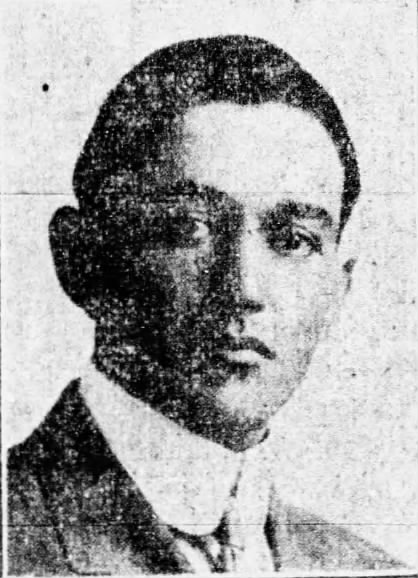
- Martin, ca. 1911

Member of the Arizona Senate from the Pima County district
- In office January 1915 – January 1917
- Preceded by: John T. Hughes; A. A. Worsley
- Succeeded by: J. W. Buchanan; F. O. Goodell

Personal details
- Born: September 13, 1886 Tucson, Arizona
- Died: January 27, 1969 (aged 82) Tucson, Arizona
- Party: Democratic
- Spouse: January 27, 1969
- Education: University of Arizona
- Profession: Politician

Andrew P. Martin was an Arizona politician who served a single term in the Arizona State Senate during the 2nd Arizona State Legislature. He was known as the father of the Arizona National Guard, having organized and led the first company in the (at the time) territory in 1910. With no formal education in pharmacology, he became a registered pharmacist, and grew his father's single drugstore to become the largest drugstore chain in Tucson, before selling it in 1954. He was also called the father of the University of Arizona College of Pharmacology, having led the drive to establish the school. In addition, he saw combat as an artillery soldier during World War I.

== Personal life ==
Martin was born on September 13, 1886, at his parents' house on Camp Street (now Broadway) in Tucson, Arizona, one of eight children. In 1896, he began working as an apprentice in his father's drug store, The George Martin Drug Company. He first attended the San Augustin Parochial School, before transferring to the Safford School. After Safford, since there was no high school in Tucson at that time, he attended the preparatory school at the University of Arizona, where he graduated in 1907 and entered the university. He graduated from the University of Arizona in 1910. While he never had any formal pharmacological training, he became a registered pharmacist in 1904.

Martin served as a captain in the Arizona National Guard, commanding Company K of the First Regiment. He was the one who organized the company, the first National Guard company in Arizona. Upon the United States' entry into World War I, Martin enlisted and as a private was part of the first contingent from Arizona to leave for the war. He served in a field artillery unit and saw action in France and Germany, rising to the rank of sergeant. He participated in the Battle of Saint-Mihiel and the Meuse–Argonne offensive, and after peace was declared he was part of the U.S. occupation force in Germany.

In 1919, he organized the American Legion in Arizona, and established the first American Legion post in Tucson, becoming the State Commander. In 1929 he served on the committee which re-drafted Tucson's city charter. He was a member of the Civilian Defense Board, and was instrumental in getting Arizona to exclude part of the oath which stated to "forgive and pardon" those who had advocated the overthrow of the U. S. Government prior to 1941. He said that the phrase had been included by "some parlor pink" in Washington D.C. A Roman Catholic, he was an active member of the Knights of Columbus.

Martin died on January 27, 1969, in St. Mary's Hospital in Tucson. He had been in the hospital for approximately one month prior to his death.

== Business career ==
In 1913, he would become president of the George Martin Drug Company, which he grew into the largest drug store chain in Tucson with seven locations. It also had a location in Casa Grande. Martin sold the drug business in September 1954 to the Ryan-Evans Drug company of Phoenix (which was subsequently brought by Revco in 1968), which at the time operated 19 stores in the Phoenix area. While selling the drug operations, the George Martin Drug Co. retained all the property rights on the 8 stores, as well as some warehouse locations. He was known as the father of the College of Pharmacology at the University of Arizona. He had organized the Arizona State Pharmaceutical Association, and was the prime motivator for the creation of a pharmacy school. After the school's creation, it eventually became the College of Pharmacology.

== Political career ==
In the fall 1911, Martin was one of three Democrats nominated to run for the three seats from Pima County for the 1st Arizona State Legislature, along with S. W. Purcell and J. W. Buchanan. In the general election in December, Martin narrowly finished fourth, behind Republicans Kirke T. Moore (who finished first) and Frank L. Crofoot (who finished third), and Democrat Buchanan who came in second. Martin garnered 910 votes to Crofoot's 936. In 1912, Martin became the private secretary to Congressman Carl Hayden. He spent 18 months with Hayden in Washington D. C. before returning in 1914 to run for the Arizona State Senate. He announced his candidacy in July 1914. Incumbent A. A. Worsley had announced that he would not run for re-election, while the other incumbent John T. Hughes was running. Besides Hughes and Martin, there were two other Democrats vying for the two nominations: R. N. Leatherwood and Mose Drachman. However, Hughes dropped out of the race in mid-August. Martin and Drachman won the two Democrat nominations, and were easy winners in the November general election. Conjecture at the beginning of 1916 was that Martin would run for re-election to the State Senate, and with Mose Drachman ineligible to run due to his appointment as Senior Clerk to the District Superior Court, his fellow Democrat, J. W. Buchanan, who had served two terms in the lower house, would run with him on the ticket. However, in August Martin announced that he would not be running for re-election.
