= A. A. Worsley =

American politician in Arizona

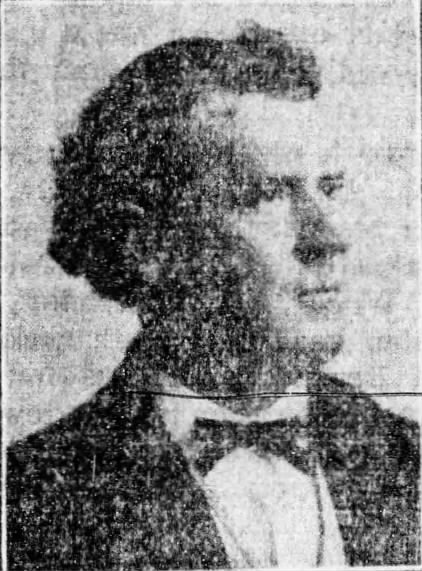
- Worsley, ca. 1911

Member of the Arizona Senate from the Pima County district
- In office March 1912 – January 1915
- Preceded by: Constituency established
- Succeeded by: Mose Drachman; A. P. Martin

Personal details
- Born: June 24, 1869 Racine, Wisconsin
- Died: January 5, 1927 (aged 57) Tucson, Arizona
- Party: Populist; Socialist; Labor; Democratic
- Spouse: Alice
- Children: Henry George; Paul Robert; Dorcas Maria
- Profession: Politician

Colonel A. A. Worsley (Albinus A. Worsley) was a politician from Arizona who served in the 1st Arizona State Legislature. Worsley was also an attorney, who practiced in Tucson, Arizona. He was married to Alice J. Worsley.

== Early life ==
Worsley was born on June 24, 1869, in Racine, Wisconsin. He was a direct descendent of Oliver Cromwell, through his father, Thomas G. Worsley, who had immigrated from Lancashire, England at the age of 16, and moved to Wisconsin. His father was a pioneer farmer, who married Marie Shields, who had moved to the United States from Queens County, Ireland.

In St. Louis, Missouri in 1892, he organized the first Direct Legislation League in the United States. In 1895, while living in Yorkville, Wisconsin, Worsley wrote a book titled, Corporation Rats in Our National Corn Crib, which dealt with finances from the perspective of the People's Party philosophy. In 1900, he graduated from the Northern Indiana Law School, followed by a year at the Chicago College of Law, after which he was admitted to the Illinois bar. The next year he moved to Nebraska, where he practiced law before moving to Tucson, Arizona in 1904. That same year, he married his wife, Alice J. Major, who was also originally from Wisconsin. And the couple had three children, Henry George, Paul Robert, and Dorcas Maria.

== Political career ==
In 1894 Worsley was nominated to run for Wisconsin state senator on the People's Party ticket. In the general election, he finished third out of four candidates. E. G. Timme, the Republican, finished first with 6,381 votes, the Democrat, Adam Apple came in second with 4,120 votes, Worsley netted 1,915, and the Progressive party candidate, John Rhodes, garnered 326 votes.

By the time he moved to Arizona, Worsley had become a member of the Socialist Party, and while he advocated for statehood, he was a strong proponent that New Mexico and Arizona should be admitted as a single state, touring the state and giving lectures on the subject. After giving a speech on September 21, 1906, in Phoenix, the local socialist organization thought that Worsley was voicing support for the candidacy of Mr. Ainsley, and began the process of kicking him out of the Socialist party, since their policy was not to show support for anyone of another party. Rather than going through the process, Worsley left the party voluntarily. However, in 1907, Worsley was still working within the socialist party.

By 1910 Worsley had switched over to the Labor Party. He was one of the five nominees from the Labor Party for becoming a delegate from Pima County to the State Constitutional Convention. However, all five delegates sent to the convention from Pima County were Republicans. In August 1911, it was expected that Worsley would run for the state attorney general slot, under the Democrats' ticket. However, at the end of September Worsley had decided not to run for the attorney general position, instead opting to run for the state senate. He sought one of the two Democrat nominations. He was one of three men running for the Democrat slots, the other two being John T. Hughes and John L. Seamonds. In the primary, Worsley finished first with 378 votes, Hughes came in second with 326, and Seamonds finished third with 210, making Worsley and Hughes the Democrat nominees. In December's general election, despite the fact that most of the races in Pima County went to the Republicans, the two Democrats, Worsley and Hughes, defeated their Republican opponents, E. M. Dickerman and G. W. Dietz, to become Pima County's first two state senators. Worsley came in first overall of the four candidates, with 1,015 votes, with his fellow Democrat Hughes in second with 915. The two Republicans, Dickerman and Dietz garnered 862 and 813 votes respectively.

Worsley's belief was that the most important mission of the first legislature was to codify in law the statutes outlined in the state constitution. Since the session was only supposed to last 60 days, he was unsure that was enough time to get the job done. He suggested that the house and the senate split up the task, first recognizing which laws were needed, then the house taking half, while the senate would work on the other half. Governor George W. P. Hunt selected Worsley to be his spokesman in the senate to put forth the governor's legislative program. He was considered a radical, Hunt believed that the measures proposed would be popular. Like his fellow Pima Democrat, John T. Hughes, Worsley supported an amendment to the state constitution granting women's suffrage. When House Bill Number 77 came before the senate education committee, of which Worsley was a part, it included a provision for the segregation of black children. Worsley argued successfully that the word "shall" be changed to "may", his amendment prescribed "That the trustees of a district 'may' segregate" Negro children, rather than that they 'shall' segregate them." With Worsley's amendment, the bill passed the senate unanimously. However, when it went back to the house, they were adamant that the word "shall" be reinstated, and that was how the final bill was passed by the legislature. In the first special session of the legislature, Worsley co-authored a bill with C. M. Roberts to put forth an amendment which would abolish the state senate. They claimed that the body was an "entirely useless adjunct of the state government". The bill failed. He espoused his arguments in favor of the amendment in a long letter to the editor in The Arizona Republican in June 1912.

As early as June 1913, prognosticators were speculating that Worsley would challenge Hunt for the gubernatorial nomination in the Democrat primary in 1914. This speculation continued throughout the end of 1913 stating that he would represent the labor faction of the party, although in October Worsley, while not denying that he would run for the nomination, stated that it was too early to declare himself a candidate, that between then and spring 1914, things might change. However, in September, he did say that if he ran, he would not seek the endorsement of the labor unions. He felt that no candidate should. Political watchers felt that Worsley would be the only one who the incumbent, Hunt, would fear in the Democrat's primary. Hunt was so concerned that he began a fifth column campaign to get Worsley to run for the U.S. Senate seat instead of the governor's position. However, Worsley adamantly denied ever considering running for the U.S. Senate seat. In February, sources told the newspapers that Worsley was no longer considering the governorship, but would instead run for the Democrat nomination for the U. S. House of Representatives seat, against inclumbent Carl Hayden. Worsley stated that it would be impossible for him to withdraw from the gubernatorial race, since he never declared that he was running, however, he did not say that he did not intend to run. By June 1914, speculation had turned to him running for re-election to the state senate, but shortly after that, Worsley categorically that not only was he not going to run for re-election, but neither was he running for the governorship, or any other office.

In 1916 Worsley re-entered politics by announcing he would challenge Carl Hayden for the Democrat nomination for Arizona's congressional seat. In the primary Hayden defeated Worsley by an "overwhelming majority". Of the 14 counties in Arizona, Worsley only won his home county of Pima. In August 1920, Worsley filed his petition to run for the Democrat's nomination for U.S. Senator in the September Primaries. He was one of four candidates for the Democrat nomination, the others being the incumbent, Marcus A. Smith, Rawghlie Clement Stanford, and John W. Norton. Worsley finished third in the primary, behind the winner, Smith, and Stanford.

== Life outside politics ==
In 1905 Worsley, along with his law partner, James D. Van Dyke, and two others, created the corporation, The Knight Gold Mining and Milling Company, with Worsley as president. By 1907 Worsley was no longer partners with Van Dyke, instead he formed a law partnership with Sol Drachman, named Worsley & Drachman. However, Drachman died in March 1908 at the age of 27. In 1898, Drachman had been a member of Teddy Roosevelt's Rough Riders, during which time he had contracted a fever, the effects of which plagued him for the remainder of his life. He had been in Denver, Colorado with his mother, but returned home to Tucson the week prior, where his health declined rapidly, finally ending in his death from an aneurism.

Worsley was considered an excellent speaker, and an expert on economics. In August 1905, Worsley gave a series of four weekly speeches in the public park on economics and politics. The last of these was a speech on the single tax concept, of which Worsley was a staunch supporter.

On August 25, 1905, Worsley's wife delivered a son. Later that year, in December 1905, Worsley and Van Dyke formed another mining company, along with three other partners, called The Southwestern Mines Development Company. In May 1907 Worsley incorporated another company, this time with four other partners, the El Tiro Copper Company. The company was formed to develop and mine claims near Silver Bell, Arizona.

In July 1912 Worsley was involved in an interesting murder case. Several years earlier, Juan Padillas, a citizen of Mexico, murdered a fellow Mexican citizen in Nogales, Arizona. Shortly after the crime, Padillas was subdued by Mexican police, who transported him back to Sonora, where he was tried, convicted, and sentenced to two years in prison. This was done in spite of the Mexican government having no jurisdiction in the case. Upon his release, Padillas returned to Nogales, where he was promptly arrested by U.S. authorities for the same crime. Worsley successfully argued that regardless of the lack of jurisdiction of the Mexican authorities, jeopardy was attached. Padillas was released. It was thought to be the first such case of this type of jeopardy ever being brought up in an Arizona court of law.

While not engaging in politics, Worsley remained active as attorney and public speaker. After the Bisbee Deportations in 1917, Worsley worked pro bono for hundreds of the deportees, and succeeded in getting them cash settlements from the mining company. Worsley was normally a defense attorney, but when Cochise County prosecutor R. N. French was taken ill during the jury selection process in the Henry A. Wootten trial, which was part of the second round of trials associated with the Bisbee Deportation incident, Worsley was named to succeed him as prosecutor. However, upon French's recovery by the end of February, he again took the reins of the prosecution, with Worsley assisting. The trial lasted through March and April, and on April 30, after a 16-minute deliberation, Wootten was acquitted of the kidnapping charges. Worsley died on January 5, 1927, in a Tucson hospital. He had been ill for over a month.
