= Ridin' the Rainbow =

1944 novel by Rosemary Drachman Taylor

- Author: Rosemary Drachman Taylor
- Language: English
- Subject: Americana
- Genre: Comedy
- Set in: Tucson, Arizona
- Publisher: Whittlesey House
- Publication date: 1944
- Publication place: United States
- Pages: 271

Ridin' the Rainbow is a 1944 novel by Rosemary Drachman Taylor. Like her first novel, Chicken Every Sunday, this novel was also about her family, but whereas the first novel's protagonist was Ethel, the family matriarch, this novel focused on the family's patriarch, Mose, and his various business dealings. The working title of the novel was The Town's Coming This Way, which was an expression her father used whenever he brought a large tract of undeveloped property.

== Plot ==
Mose Drachman is a young man in the Arizona Territory, trying to make his way. He starts working in his Uncle Sam's cigar store, before beginning to sell Arbuckle coffee, which proved highly successful. Over the years he gets involved in oil wells, gold mines, steam laundries, and real estate development.

== Reception ==
The Corpus Christi Caller-Times said the novel was "one of the most amusing personal histories available this season." The Philadelphia Inquirer also gave the novel a positive review, although they did not like it as much as Chicken Every Sunday.
