= James Garvin =

James Garvin may refer to:

- J. L. Garvin (James Louis Garvin, 1868–1947), British writer
- James Garvin (basketball) (born 1950), American basketball player
- Jimmy Garvin (born 1952), American professional wrestler
- James B. Garvin, NASA scientist
- James S. Garvin (1873-1945), member of the Arizona Senate
