= William P. Mahoney Jr. =

American attorney and US Ambassador (1916–2000)

3rd United States Ambassador to Ghana
- In office June 22, 1962 – May 26, 1965
- President: John F. Kennedy; Lyndon B. Johnson
- Preceded by: Francis H. Russell
- Succeeded by: Franklin Williams

Personal details
- Born: November 27, 1916 Prescott, Arizona
- Died: April 27, 2000 (aged 83) Phoenix, Arizona
- Party: Democratic

William P. Mahoney Jr. (November 27, 1916 – April 27, 2000) was an American attorney who served as the United States Ambassador to Ghana from 1962 to 1965. He is the father of Richard Mahoney, and the son of W. P. Mahoney (William P. Mahoney Sr.), a former Arizona state senator.
