= Richard Mahoney =

American politician and academic (born 1951)

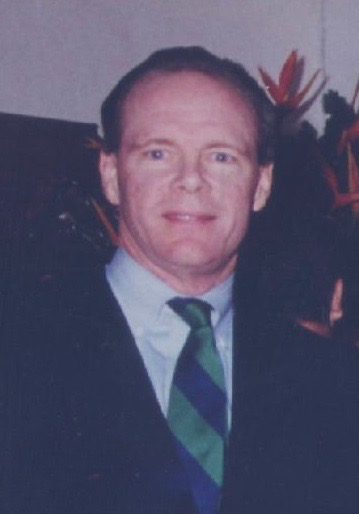

15th Secretary of State of Arizona
- In office March 6, 1991 – January 2, 1995
- Governor: Fife Symington
- Preceded by: James Shumway
- Succeeded by: Jane Dee Hull

Personal details
- Born: May 28, 1951 (age 75) Glendale, Arizona, U.S.
- Party: Democratic; Independent
- Education: Brophy College Preparatory
- Alma mater: Princeton University; Johns Hopkins University; Arizona State University

Richard D. Mahoney (born May 28, 1951) is an American politician and academic. He was the Secretary of State of Arizona from 1991 until 1995. He has been the director of the School of Public and International Affairs at North Carolina State University, since July 1, 2012. SPIA is part of NC State's College of Humanities and Social Sciences. He is the son of US ambassador William P. Mahoney Jr. and grandson of Arizona politician W. P. Mahoney.

== Academia ==
Mahoney was educated at Brophy College Preparatory, Princeton University, Johns Hopkins University and Arizona State University.

Mahoney has lectured as a visiting professor at Templeton College (Oxford University), The JFK School of Government (Harvard University), the Beijing Institute of Foreign Trade, and the Universidad Del Pacífico – Ecuador (Quito campus). He was also professor emeritus at the Thunderbird School of Global Management.

Mahoney is the author of three books, two of which are about the John F. Kennedy administration: JFK: Ordeal in Africa (1983) and Sons and Brothers: The Days of Jack and Bobby Kennedy (1999). His latest book is titled Getting Away with Murder: The Real Story Behind American Taliban John Walker Lindh and What the U.S. Government Had to Hide (2004). Mahoney has also authored numerous articles and monographs on presidential history, foreign policy, international trade, and political risk; and a volume of poetry in Spanish, titled Pétalos (1995). He was interviewed for the 2021 documentary JFK Revisited: Through the Looking Glass.

== Political career ==
A member of the Democratic Party, Mahoney served as chief speechwriter in the presidential campaigns of Senators Gary Hart and Paul Simon in the 1980s. Mahoney was elected by a landslide as the 14th Secretary of State of Arizona in 1990, alongside the narrow election of Republican Governor Fife Symington. Mahoney led gubernatorial Democrat Terry Goddard by 50,000 votes, and beat Republican Treasurer Ray Rottas by over 170,000 votes, taking every county in the state.

The inauguration of Arizona's executive offices changed from March to January, which meant Mahoney served two fewer months when his term ended in 1995. Mahoney was the last Democrat to hold the office of Arizona Secretary of State until the election of Katie Hobbs in 2018. He ran for the United States Senate in 1994, narrowly losing the primary to Sam Coppersmith by 132 votes (or 0.05% of all votes cast in the Democratic Primary). He ran as an independent for Governor of Arizona in 2002, but polled under 7%.

== Post-political career ==
Mahoney formed a foundation, Nuestra Familia, in 1998. The foundation started social entrepreneurship projects, including the creation of small profit centers to fund social justice and human development programs, in two Latin American countries.

Mahoney served as head of the Baker Institute for Peace and Conflict Studies at Juniata College until his departure to the School of Public and International Affairs at North Carolina State University.

== Published works ==
- JFK: Ordeal in Africa. Oxford University Press. 1983. ISBN 978-0195033410.
- Sons and Brothers: The Days of Jack and Bobby Kennedy. Arcade Publishing. 1999. ISBN 978-1559704809.

Political offices
Preceded by James Shumway	14th Secretary of State of Arizona; March 6, 1991 – January 2, 1995	Succeeded by Jane Dee Hull
