= W. P. Mahoney House =

United States historic place in Kingman, Arizona

- U.S. National Register of Historic Places
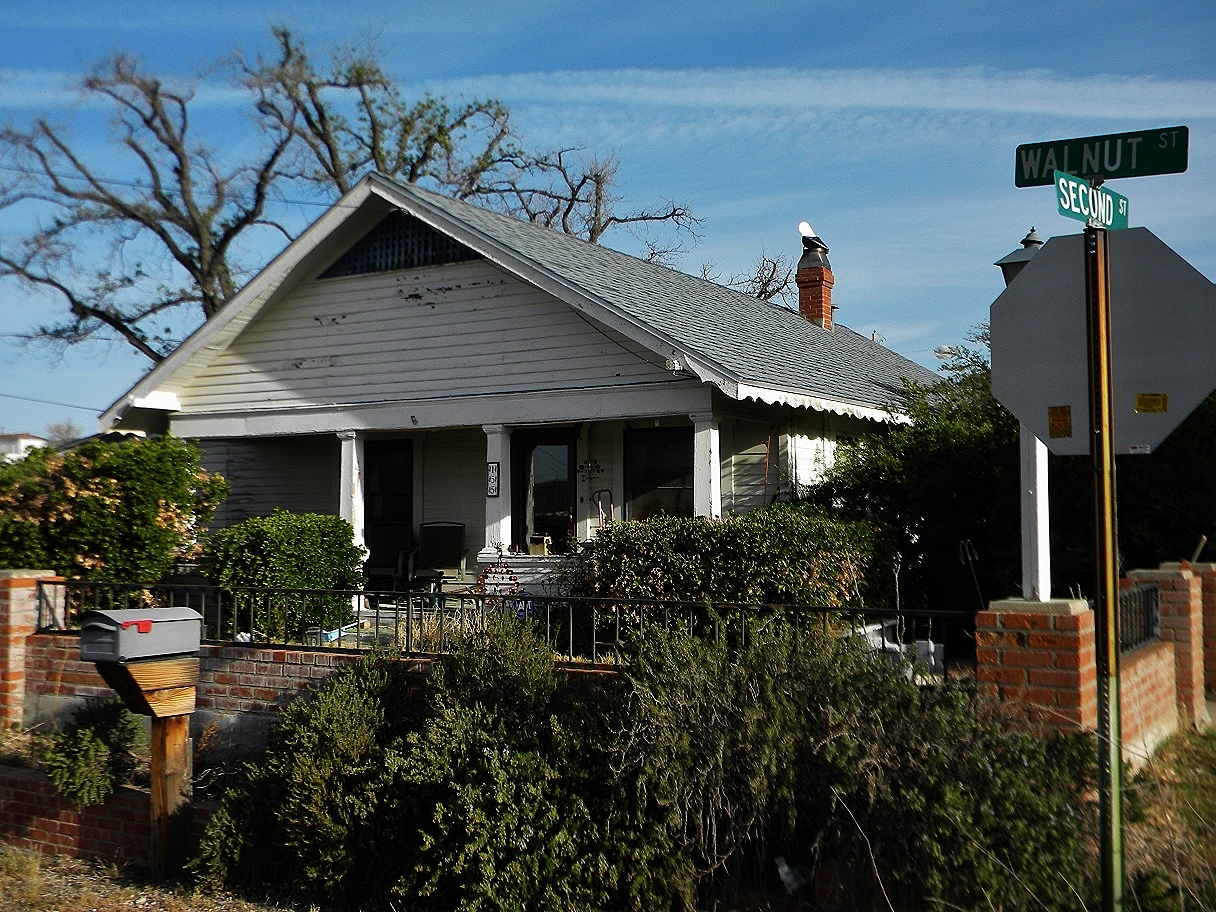

- Location within Arizona Location within the United States
- Location: 155 East Walnut Street, Kingman, Arizona
- Coordinates: 35°11′40″N 114°3′18″W
- Built: 1921–23
- Architectural style: Bungalow/Craftsman
- MPS: Kingman MRA
- NRHP reference No.: 86001163
- Added to NRHP: May 14, 1986

W. P. Mahoney House is in Kingman, Arizona. The house was built in 1919–23. It is a Bungalow/Craftsman style house. Mr. Mahoney came to Arizona as an Irish immigrant, worked the western mines until 1912. He organized the first miners union. In 1914 he served in the Arizona House and 1916 Arizona Senate. He came to Kingman and became the Mohave County Sheriff from 1918 to 1926 and he lived in the house from 1919 to 1927. He left Kingman in 1927 and continued in public office till 1967. This house was placed on the National Register of Historic Places and the number is 86001163.

It was evaluated for National Register listing as part of a 1985 study of 63 historic resources in Kingman that led to this and many others being listed.
