= J. F. Hechtman =

Arizona politician

Member of the Arizona Senate from the Gila County district
- In office March 1912 – January 1914
- Preceded by: First senator from Gila County
- Succeeded by: John E. Bacon

Personal details
- Born: August 5, 1854
- Died: February 26, 1933 Globe, Arizona
- Party: Democratic
- Profession: Politician

John F. Hechtman (1854–1933) was a politician from Arizona, who served as a senator in the 1st Arizona State Legislature, serving Gila County.

== Life ==
Hechtman was a judge in Arizona. He was born in Erie, Pennsylvania on August 5, 1854. During his youth, he served as a page for the U.S. Senate, and was a playmate of Tad Lincoln. Before moving to Arizona in 1878, he worked as an attorney and in the mining industry in Colorada.

He came to Arizona in 1878, and moved to Globe in 1899. In 1903, he was one of the founders of the Globe Mining Company, and served as their president. While still president of the Globe Mining Company, in 1908 Hechtman also founded The Western Company, which would be engaged in the "manufacture, import, export, buy, sell, distribute, store, warehouse and generally deal in goods, wares and merchandise, meats and provisions, drugs and chemicals, heavy and shelf hardware and property of every class and description." By 1920 he was a U.S. Commissioner for the district court.

Hechtman died on February 26, 1933, in Globe, Arizona at the age of 79. He had been hospitalized for several months with an illness. At the time of his death, he had the distinction of being the oldest living former U.S. Senate page.

== Political career ==
In 1911, he was one of the first two state senators from Gila County elected to the 1st State Legislature. He did not run for re-election in 1914.
