= J. W. Buchanan =

American politician from Arizona

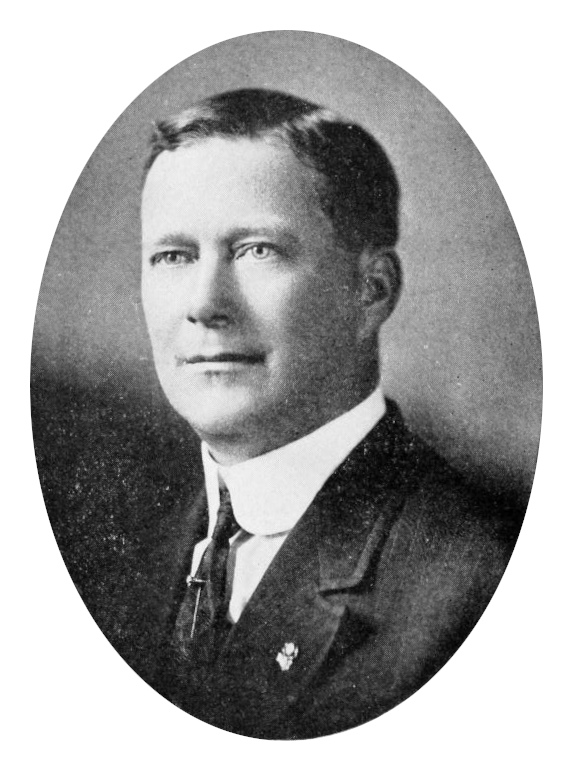
- Buchanan, c. 1913

Member of the Arizona House of Representatives from the Pima County
- In office March 1912 – December 1916
- Preceded by: First representative from Pima County
- Succeeded by: A. R. Buehman; J. P. Mallory

Member of the Arizona Senate from the Pima County district
- In office January 1917 – December 1918
- Preceded by: Mose Drachman; A. P. Martin
- Succeeded by: A. R. Buehman

Personal details
- Born: December 17, 1869 Brandon, Mississippi, U.S.
- Died: July 13, 1941 (aged 71) El Paso, Texas, U.S.
- Party: Democratic
- Spouse: Gertrude Maude Shapley (m. 1914)
- Profession: Politician

John Waddy Buchanan (December 17, 1869 – July 13, 1941) was an American politician from Arizona who served in the states first three legislatures, the first two in the House of Representatives, and the third in the State Senate. During his political career he also served as Pima County Treasurer and as Tucson's City Treasurer.

== Personal life ==
John Waddy Buchanan was born December 17, 1869, near Brandon, Mississippi. He moved to Houston, Texas in the 1890s, prior to moving to Tucson in 1905. Early in his career he worked as a farmer, a carpenter and a merchant. Buchanan was an employee of the Southern Pacific Railroad. In 1912 he was promoted to car service agent for the Arizona Eastern Railway, which was being leased by Southern Pacific. He retired from the railroad in the mid-1920s when the company headquarters were moved to Guadalajara.

Buchanan wed Gertrude Maude Shapley of Houston, Texas on June 24, 1914, in the First Presbyterian Church (Houston). The two had met several years earlier when Buchanan was living in Houston. In July 1941, Buchanan and his wife were traveling by car from Tucson to visit her relatives in Houston, and then his relations in Brandon, Mississippi. En route, they were in a car wreck near Fort Hancock, Texas. Buchanan was hospitalized in El Paso with internal injuries and fractured ribs. While in the hospital he contracted pneumonia and died on July 13.

== Political career ==
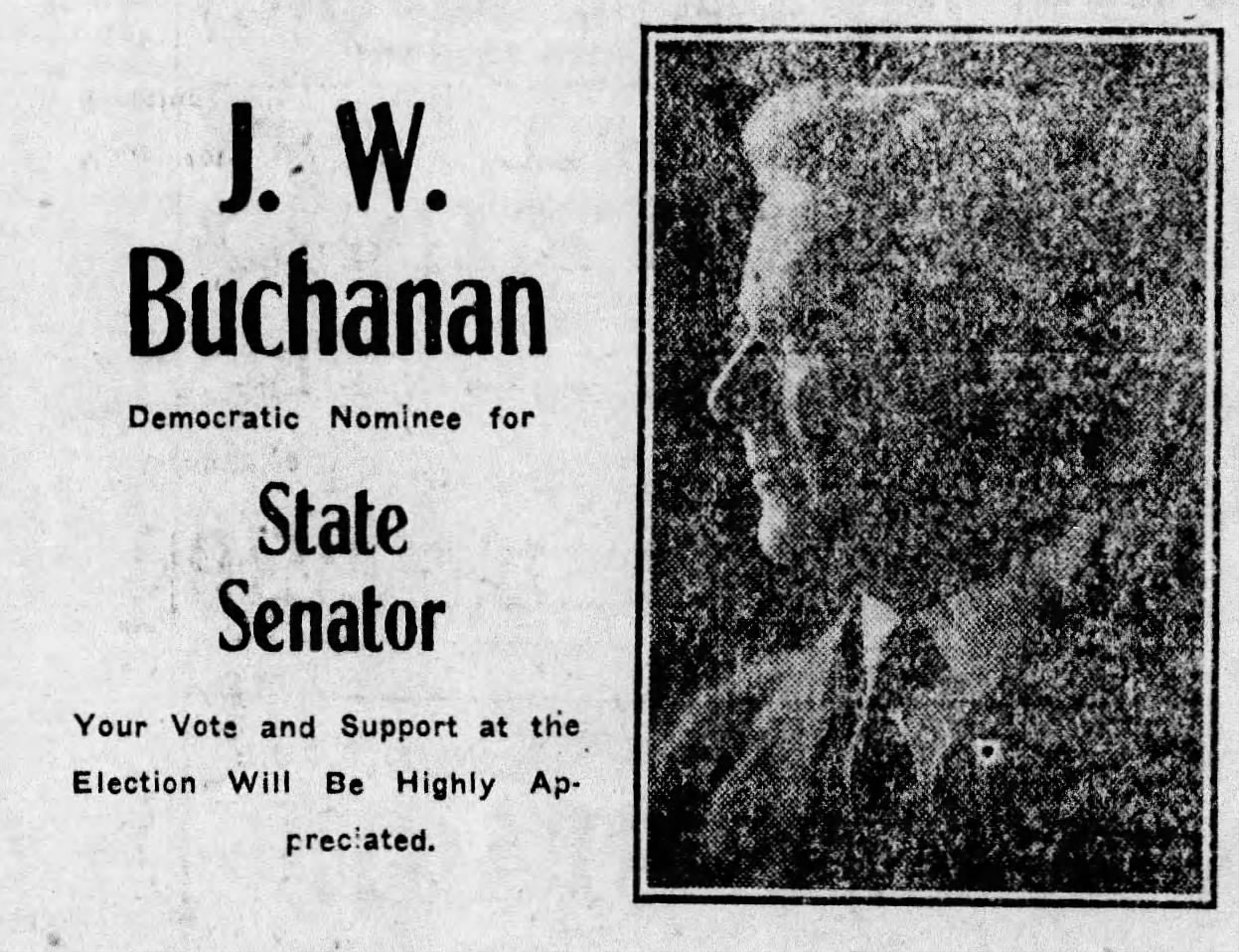
Buchanan's 1916 ad for Arizona State Senator

In 1911 Buchanan announced his intention to run for one of the three seats from Pima County in the state House of Representatives in the 1st Arizona State Legislature. Running as a Democrat, there were four others in the primary. He won the primary, along with S. W. Purcell and Andrew P. Martin, and in the general election, he was the only one of the three democrats to win a seat in the House. In 1914 Buchanan ran for re-election to the House. His re-election was opposed by the Democrat's state machine. 5 Democrats ran for the three House seats in the primary. Buchanan, along with J. Breck Richardson and Sheldon A. Reed were the top vote getters. In the general election only one of the two incumbent Republicans ran for re-election, Frank L. Crofoot. The three Democrats all won, with Reed narrowly besting Crofoot, 1488–1471. Buchanan was only one of three members of the first House of Representatives to return for the 2nd Arizona State Legislature, the others being William E. Brooks and W. J. Graham. In 1916 it was initially speculated that Buchanan would run for re-election in the House, however, by July Buchanan had set his sights on the Senate seat being vacated by Mose Drachman, who had resigned due to his appointment as clerk to the Superior Court. There were initially three Democrats seeking the nomination for the two Senate seats, but in August the incumbent, Andrew P. Martin dropped out of the race, leaving just Buchanan and John T. Hughes. Since they were unopposed, they became the Democrat's nominees. However, in the general election, Hughes was defeated by Republican F. O. Goodell, while Buchanan won. In 1918 Buchanan decided not to run for the Senate again, choosing to run for one of two seats on the Pima County Board of Supervisors. He came in third out of four candidates for the Democrat's nomination.

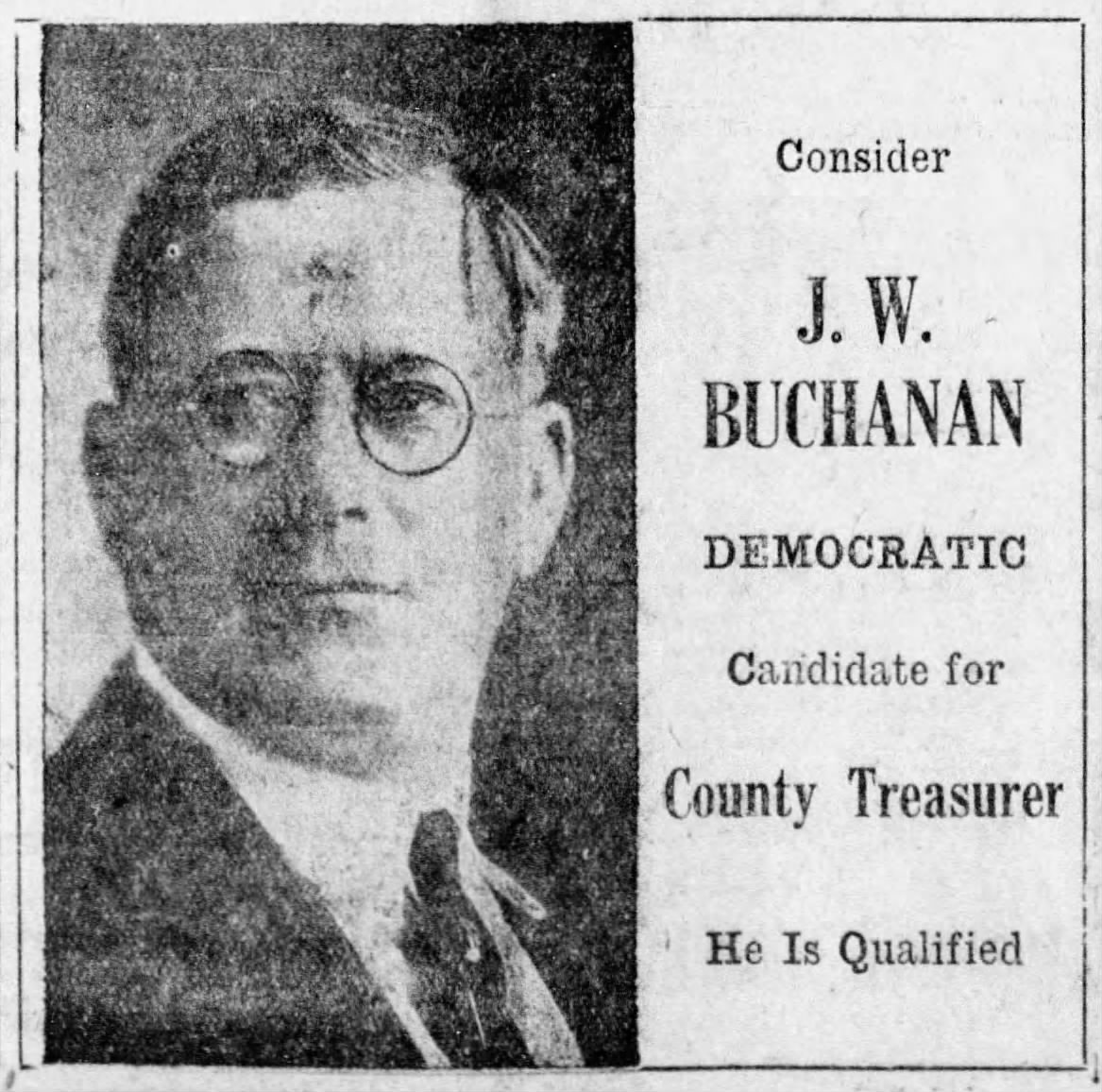
J. W. Buchanan ad for county treasurer, 1926

Buchanan remained out of politics for several years, until 1926 when he announced his intention to run for Pima County treasurer. Three Democrats entered the primary, Buchanan, Herbert C. Chambers, and Charles F. Gulden. In a close race, which included a recount, Buchanan edged out Gulden 1956 votes to 1800. Buchanan followed this with a landslide victory over Republican Walter E. Fuller in the November election, getting almost twice as many votes, 1625 to 850. Buchanan ran for re-election for county treasurer in 1928. He ran unopposed in both the Democrats' primary and the November general election.

In 1930 Buchanan was precluded from running for re-election for county treasurer due to term limits. In December he was short-listed to become Tucson's city treasurer, and was appointed to that position in January 1931. He was Tucson's first city treasurer under their new charter. As city treasurer, he was the first to hire a full-time Spanish-American to the treasurer's staff. Buchanan lost the city treasurer position in 1932, when due to budget cuts the position was consolidated into the city clerk's office. Later in the year, in November, Mit Simms, Arizona State Treasurer, appointed Buchanan to be the inheritance tax examiner for Pima County, to fill out the remaining term of Bradford Duncan, who had died. He held the position until July 1935, when W. M. Cox, then state treasurer, decided not to re-appoint him.

In 1936 Buchanan decided to run for a seat on Tucson's Board of Supervisors, in the second district. In the Democrats' primary in September, Buchanan came in third of four candidates.
