= Come Clean, My Love =

1949 novel by Rosemary Drachman Taylor

- Author: Rosemary Drachman Taylor
- Language: English
- Subject: Americana
- Genre: Comedy
- Set in: Tucson, Arizona
- Publisher: T. Y. Crowell Company
- Publication date: 1949
- Publication place: United States
- Pages: 245

Come Clean, My Love is a 1949 novel by Rosemary Drachman Taylor. Like her prior novels, the book began as a re-telling of factual events about her family's life in early 1900s Tucson. This time it was to focus on her brother Oliver and his inheriting their father's steam laundry, but due to complaints from her family about telling all their secrets, and the author's own feeling of constraint about having to follow real life, the novel turned into one of pure fiction. In May 1949 the book was selected to appear in condensed form in Woman's Home Companion. To celebrate the launch of the new book, a party was thrown at the steam laundry in Tucson, Arizona started by her father and run by her brother, which became the fictional setting for the novel. John Winchcombe-Taylor, Taylor's husband, adapted the book into a play, which premiered in Tucson at the Tucson Little Theater in October 1949.

== Plot ==
When Wyatt Bruce's father suddenly cuts off his alimony payments, Wyatt is forced to look for work. His mother owns a half-interest in a local steam laundry, however the laundry is not doing well. Wyatt goes to work at the laundry in order to turn it into a success. With the help of his wealthy fiancé, Cordelia, he turns the business around, but also creates a love triangle between himself, Cordelia, and the daughter of the owner of the other half of the laundry, Janey.

== Reception ==
The book received mixed reviews. The Arizona Daily Star said that "Mrs. Taylor has written a farce comedy with no pretensions other than wringing out as many laughs as the laundry did sheets. It's fun". The Indianapolis Star gave the book a good review, stating that the book "mixes a fresh entertainment salad listed on the booksellers summer menu", and that "It can't miss." The Los Angeles Times also enjoyed the book, calling it, "Fun in a laundry", and further stating, "Mrs. Taylor's slang shot manner of writing is a little maudlin at times, but it is never mincing or will-o'-the-wisp. She has a roguish and disrespectful eye for the amenities.
