= Fred W. Wessel =

American politician in Arizona (died 1914)

Member of the Arizona Senate from the Yuma County district
- In office March 1912 – January 1915
- Preceded by: First Senator from Yuma County
- Succeeded by: J. S. Garvin

Personal details
- Born: Mississippi
- Died: April 27, 1914 Colton, California
- Party: Democratic
- Spouse: Mary J. Petijohn
- Profession: Politician

Fred W. Wessel was a politician from Arizona who served in the 1st Arizona State Legislature.

Wessel was born in Mississippi, and grew up in California. He came to Arizona in 1891 and was a cattleman, whose ranch was near Yuma, Arizona, in Laguna, where he also was very successful growing oranges. He married Mary J. Petijohn in 1895.

In the 1900s, he was the Yuma County school superintendent. He won the Democrat's primary in October 1911 to run for the state senate, and then followed up with a victory in the December general election, making him the first state senator from Yuma County.

While visiting his wife's parents in Colton, California, Wessel died of heart failure on April 27, 1914. He had moved to Colton from Yuma in 1913, prior to the second and third special sessions of the state legislature, and had to return to Phoenix to attend those session.
