= James Shumway =

American politician (1939–2003)

14th Secretary of State of Arizona
- In office April 4, 1988 – March 6, 1991
- Governor: Rose Mofford
- Preceded by: Rose Mofford
- Succeeded by: Richard D. Mahoney

Personal details
- Born: James Hyrum Shumway; July 8, 1939; Tempe, Arizona, U.S.
- Died: May 11, 2003 (aged 63)
- Spouse: Lurline Shumway (1958-2003, his death)

James Hyrum Shumway (July 8, 1939 – May 11, 2003) was an election administrator and Secretary of State of Arizona.

He was born in Tempe and attended Tempe High School where he became a noted football player. His skill in this sport earned him a football scholarship to Brigham Young University where he also excelled at the game. It was there that he met his future wife, Lurline, and they married in 1958 and had four children.

Graduating from the university with a degree in business administration, Jim Shumway began his lengthy career in public service as a voting machine mechanic with the Maricopa County election department in 1960.

He served as the Pima County, Arizona election director from 1976 to 1980 before becoming Arizona's first state elections officer. When Secretary of State Rose Mofford assumed the post of governor in 1988, Jim Shumway became Arizona's Secretary of State. He sought but failed in his bid to maintain this position in 1990, but went on to become Maricopa County's election director and served expertly in that capacity until his retirement in 1994. He died on May 11, 2003, aged 63.

Political offices
Preceded by Rose Perica Mofford	Secretary of State of Arizona; 1988–1991	Succeeded by Richard D. Mahoney
