= 1st Arizona State Legislature =

Session of the Arizona Legislature

←	State Constitutional Convention	2nd	→
- Arizona State Capitol (2014)

Overview
- Legislative body: Arizona State Legislature
- Jurisdiction: Arizona, United States
- Term: March 18, 1912 – December 31, 1914

Senate
- Members: 19
- President: M. G. Cunniff (D)
- Party control: Democrat 15–4

House of Representatives
- Members: 35
- Speaker: Sam B. Bradner (D)
- Party control: Democrat 31–4

Sessions
- 1st: March 18 – May 18, 1912

Special sessions
- 1st: May 23 – June 22, 1912
- 2nd: February 3 – April 7, 1913
- 3rd: April 14 – May 17, 1913

The 1st Arizona State Legislature, consisting of the Arizona State Senate and the Arizona House of Representatives, was constituted from February 14, 1912 (the day Arizona was admitted to the United States) to December 31, 1914, during the first term of George Wylle Paul Hunt as Governor of Arizona, in Phoenix. The legislature was heavily skewed towards the Democrats, with their holding a 15–4 lead in the senate, and a 31–4 lead in the Arizona House of Representatives The number of senators and representatives was set by the State Constitution, with 9 counties being granted one Senator, while the other 5 were granted two. Representation in the house was also by county, apportioned by population, with each county being guaranteed a minimum of 1 Representation.

== History ==
With the transition to Statehood, the Territorial Governor, Richard E. Sloan, announced that the first statewide elections were to be held on December 12, 1911. Among other statewide offices, Sloan proclaimed that there would be 19 State Senators and 35 members of the State House of Representatives, apportioned by counties. Apache, Coconino, Mohave, Navajo, Pinal, Santa Cruz Countes were allotted 1 senator and 1 representative; Cochise County got 2 senators and 7 representatives; Gila, Pima Counties got 2 senators and 3 representatives; Graham, Greenlee, and Yuma Counties received 1 senator and 2 representatives; Maricopa got 2 senators and 6 representatives; Yavapai County received 2 senators and 4 representatives. The primary election was held on October 24, 1911.

== Sessions ==
The Legislature met for the regular session at the State Capitol in Phoenix on March 18, 1912; and adjourned on May 18.

A special session was called by the governor, and met between May 23 – June 22, 1912. A second special session was convoked, and it met from February 3 – April 7, 1913. A third special session was convened from April 14 – May 17, 1913.

== State Senate ==
=== Members ===
The asterisk (*) denotes members of the previous Legislature who continued in office as members of this Legislature.

County	Senator	Party	Notes
Apache	J. Lorenzo Hubbell	Republican	
Cochise	William P. Sims	Democrat	
Cochise	Charles M. Roberts	Democrat	
Coconino	Fred S. Breen	Republican	
Gila	J. F. Hechtman	Democrat	
Gila	Alfred Kinney	Democrat	
Graham	William W. Pace	Democrat	
Greenlee	George H. Chase	Democrat	
Maricopa	H. A. Davis	Democrat	
Maricopa	C. B. Wood	Democrat	
Mohave	Henry Lovin	Democrat	
Navajo	John H. Willis	Republican	
Pima	John T. Hughes	Democrat	
Pima	A. A. Worsley	Democrat	
Pinal	J. F. Brown	Republican	
Santa Cruz	James A. Harrison	Democrat	
Yavapai	M. G. Cunniff	Democrat	
Yavapai	H. R. Wood	Democrat	
Yuma	Fred W. Wessel	Democrat	

== House of Representatives ==
=== Members ===
The asterisk (*) denotes members of the previous Legislature who continued in office as members of this Legislature.

County	Representative	Party	Notes
Apache	Nasianceno Gonzales	Republican	
Cochise	J. M. Ball	Democrat	
Cochise	Sam B. Bradner	Democrat	
Cochise	George D. Craig	Democrat	
Cochise	A. G. Curry	Democrat	
Cochise	James F. Duncan	Democrat	
Cochise	W. J. Graham	Democrat	
Cochise	C. B. Kelton	Democrat	
Coconino	Thomas Maddock	Republican	
Gila	William E. Brooks	Democrat	
Gila	J. Tom Lewis	Democrat	
Gila	John W. Murphy	Democrat	
Graham	A. E. Jacobson	Democrat	
Graham	A. R. Lynch	Democrat	
Greenlee	M. H. Kane	Democrat	
Greenlee	William Whipple	Democrat	
Maricopa	Don C. Babbitt	Democrat	
Maricopa	George F. Cocke	Democrat	
Maricopa	J. A. R. Irvine	Democrat	
Maricopa	Leon S. Jacobs	Democrat	
Maricopa	Harry Johnson	Democrat	
Maricopa	Dan P. Jones	Democrat	
Mohave	John Ellis	Democrat	
Navajo	Frank O. Mattox	Democrat	
Pima	J. W. Buchanan	Democrat	
Pima	Frank L. Crofoot	Republican	
Pima	Kirke T. Moore	Republican	
Pinal	Alexander Barker	Democrat	
Santa Cruz	Harry Saxon	Democrat	
Yavapai	Perry Hall	Democrat	
Yavapai	H. H. Linney	Democrat	
Yavapai	A. A. Moore	Democrat	
Yavapai	P. S. Wren	Democrat	
Yuma	Thomas M. Drennan	Democrat	
Yuma	J. R. Kerr	Democrat	

== See also ==
- List of Arizona state legislatures
