= M. G. Cunniff =

American politician (1875–1914)

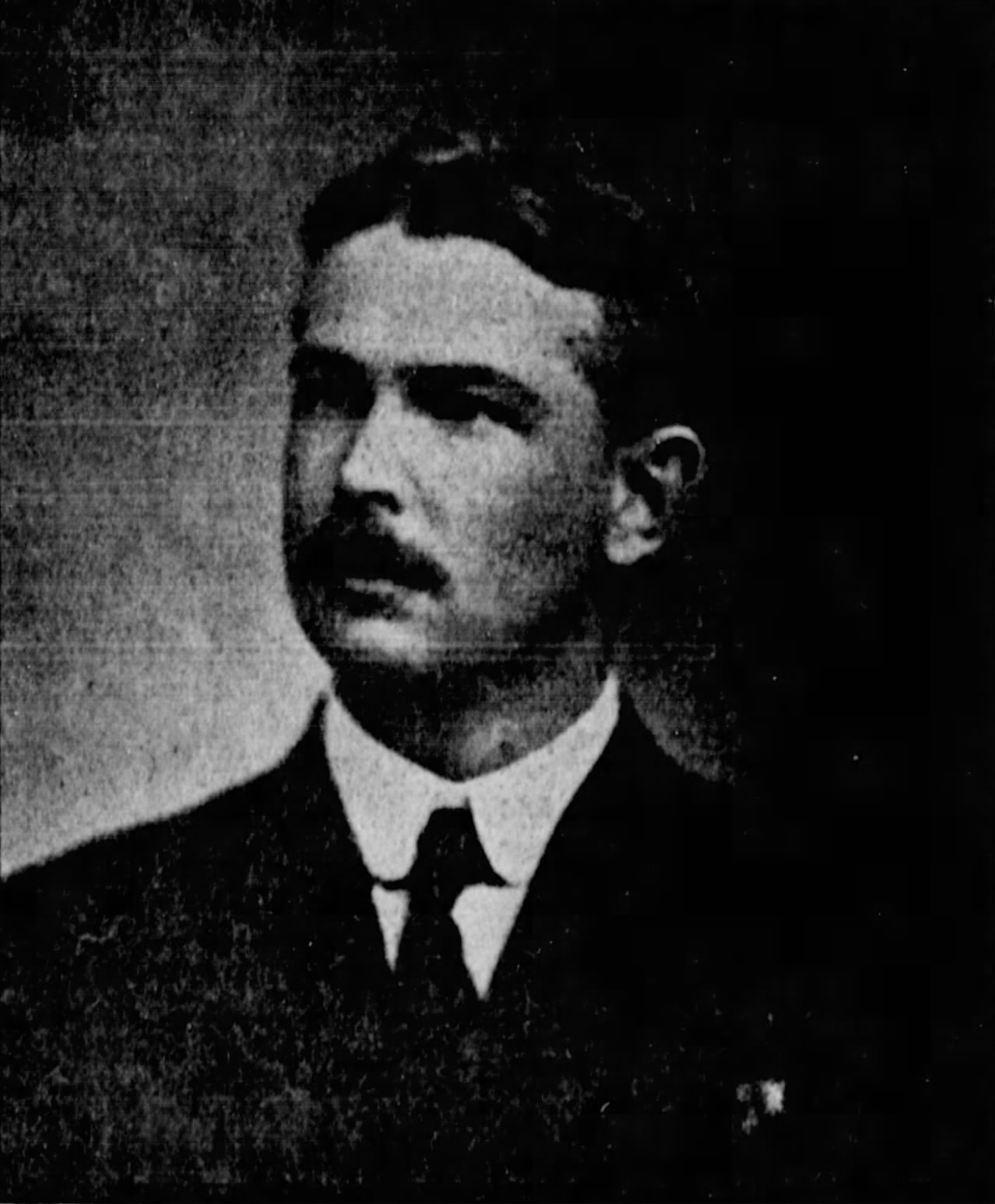
- Cunniff in 1912

Member of the Arizona Senate from the Yavapai County district
- In office March 1912 – January 1915
- Preceded by: First Senator from Yavapai County
- Succeeded by: Morris Goldwater; Frances Munds

Personal details
- Born: February 7, 1875 Boston, Massachusetts, U.S.
- Died: December 23, 1914 (aged 39) Crown King, Arizona, U.S.
- Party: Democratic
- Spouse: Eversta
- Children: Hilda; Bernard
- Education: Harvard University
- Profession: Politician

Michael Glenn Cunniff (February 7, 1875 – December 23, 1914) was a politician from Arizona who served in the 1st Arizona State Legislature. He was the first president of the Arizona senate, a journalist, and an English professor at Harvard and the University of Wisconsin.

== Early life ==
M. G. Cunniff was born in Boston, Massachusetts on February 7, 1875. He graduated from Harvard, and received his master's degree from the same institution the following year. He taught English at the university for two years. Then he moved to the University of Wisconsin, where he taught for another two years. In 1901 he moved to New York City and became an associate editor of The World's Work, where he was promoted to managing editor in 1903. In 1903 he married Eversta Spink, and the couple had two children, Hilda and Bernard. At one point he served as the personal secretary to Alton B. Parker, who was the Democrat's nominee for president in 1914. Cunniff was also a friend of the American explorer, F. A. Cook.

Cuniff was the long-time managing editor of The World's Work during the early 1900s. In 1905, he travelled to Arizona to write research the territory, as a prelude to writing an article about it for the magazine. He arrived first in Prescott where his brother, Bernard, worked the Apache-Panther mine. The article, titled "The Last of the Territories", appeared in the January 1906 edition of the magazine, and was an in-depth look at Arizona and New Mexico. It went in-depth into the question of whether or not the two territories should be given individual, or joint statehood. His summation was that those in New Mexico would prefer individual statehood, but were lukewarm about joint statehood, while the vast majority of those in Arizona were adamantly against joint statehood. Cuniff resigned from the paper and moved to Arizona in 1907. He initially settled in Prescott, where the year before he had visited and was instrumental in helping the town select his friend, Solon Borglum, to sculpt the Bucky O'Neill Monument. He also assisted the artist in his New York studio in the statue's design. In 1908 he was living in Crown King, and was the supervisor of the Savoy Mine in the Bradshaw Mountains, where his brother also worked as the general manager.

Cunniff died suddenly of acute pneumonia at his Crown King mining camp on December 23, 1914. Upon his death, Governor Hunt ordered state offices closed, and all flags to be flown at half-mast for 30 days.

== Political career ==
He was a member of the Yavapai contingent to the Territorial convention in 1908. At the Democrat convention in 1910, Cunniff was selected as one of the six delegates from Yavapai County to the state's constitutional convention. He was one of the signers of the Constitution of Arizona.

He received the Democrat's nomination to be one of two state senators from Yavapai County in October 1911, and almost immediately there was talk of his being the president of the senate, should the Democrats win a majority. In December he was elected, along with fellow Democrat H. R. Wood, to be the first state senators from Yavapai County. Even before the legislature convened, it was decided by the Democrats that Cunniff would serve as president in the senate, and he was named president as soon as the legislature was sworn in in March 1912, becoming Arizona's first president of the senate. He did not run for re-election in 1914.
