= John E. Bacon (Arizona politician) =

American surgeon and politician in Arizona

- Bacon (seated right), in 1962, age 92

Member of the Arizona Senate from the Gila County district
- In office January 1915 – January 1917
- Preceded by: J. F. Hechtman
- Succeeded by: W. D. Claypool

Personal details
- Born: March 1, 1869 Wellsboro, Pennsylvania
- Died: June 22, 1964 (aged 95) Pomona, California
- Party: Democratic
- Spouse(s): Grace James 1897-1909 (her death); Olivia Melgreen 1910-1947 (her death)
- Children: Ann, John E. Jr.
- Profession: Doctor, surgeon, politician

John Elmer Bacon was a politician from Arizona who served a single term in the Arizona state senate during the 2nd Arizona State Legislature. He was a doctor and surgeon who was an early proponent of Joseph Lister's theories on antiseptic measures. He was a charter member of the American College of Surgeons, and helped found the Southwest Medical and Surgical Association, and was president of the Arizona Medical Association. He was also one of the founders of the Arizona State League, a professional baseball league.

== Early life ==
Bacon was born on March 1, 1869. He attended public schools in Wellsboro, Pennsylvania, where he graduated from the high school in 1887 as the school's valedictorian. After graduation, he attended Lafayette College in Easton, Pennsylvania, studying Latin and science. After graduating Lafayette in 1889, he enrolled in the Pennsylvania School of Medicine (now the Perelman School of Medicine at the University of Pennsylvania) in Pennsylvania, where he graduated in 1892. In his final year at Penn Medical, he worked as a physician at St. Luke's Hospital in Bethlehem, Pennsylvania. After graduating from Penn, Bacon entered into medical practice in Wellsboro with his father, Morgan L. Bacon, who was also a doctor.

== Career ==
In 1893, he was named as a regular contributor to the American Therapist, a leading medical journal. Also in 1893, he performed an appendectomy in Philadelphia, before the term was even used. Later that year, he moved to Sumner, Washington, and took over the practice of an older doctor, but was there for a short time, returning to Wellsboro in April 1894. By May 1985, Bacon had left Wellsboro and moved to Buffalo, New York, where he set up a medical practice. In Buffalo, in addition to his medical practice, Bacon opened a real estate office in 1896.

With the outbreak of the Spanish-American War, Bacon asked for an appointment to the United States Army Medical Corps, which was granted in August 1898. He reported for duty in Washington, D.C., and was appointed a regimental surgeon and stationed at Fort Thomas near Chickamauga, Georgia. He was assigned to the 5th Regiment. He contracted malaria, and recuperated at his parents' home in Wellsboro, before going to Sandy Hook. In December 1898 he was transferred from Sandy Hook to Fort Grant, where he was witness to one of the last Indian uprisings in the U.S.

In 1901 he took over a small hospital in Tombstone, Arizona. He outbid several other doctors to gain the contract to operate the hospital and care for the county's indigent population, and prisoner's from the jail. His philosophy was to treat anyone who came to the clinic, which at that point in time included outlaws. As it became known that he would treat those on the run, more and more injured people fleeing from the law would use his services. He charged them $50 in gold for each visit. He got so popular, the local sheriff, Del Lewis, asked him to stop treating the outlaws, but he refused, stating, "My business is to take care of the sick people." He was an early proponent of the theories of Joseph Lister, when most doctors in Arizona still did not understand the importance of antiseptic surgery. In 1903 Arizona began to issue medical licenses. Bacon received license number 4. In 1910 Bacon left Tombstone and relocated to Miami. He opened a small clinic there and became the chief surgeon for the Miami Copper Company. Once there he helped organized and was elected the first president of the Gila County Medical Society. He began to make plans to build a hospital, which was constructed in 1912 and opened in 1913 as Miami-Inspiration Hospital, named after the two mining companies in the area. The hospital eventually became the Cobre Valley Regional Medical Center in Globe, Arizona.

In 1912 he was elected as president of the Arizona Medical Association. And it was also in 1912 that he first used spinal anesthesia. He was considered an expert on both surgery and polio. He was a charter member of the American College of Surgeons, and served as the head of the Arizona chapter of their credentials committee for 25 years.

He was elected to serve in the Arizona State Senate during the 2nd Arizona State Legislature, representing Gila County. Also in 1914, he was elected as president of the Southwest Medical and Surgical Association, which he helped organize, and served in that capacity until December 1919.

He retired as the chief surgeon of the Miami Inspiration Hospital in 1938, and moved to California, settling in San Marino in 1939.

== Personal life ==
He married Grace James of Elmira, New York on June 29, 1897, in Elmira. They had their first child, James, the following year. The child died at the age of 9 months. Grace died suddenly in December 1909 from pneumonia.

In November 1910 Bacon remarried, this time to Olivia Melgreen of Tombstone. The couple had two children, a son, John E. Bacon Jr., and a daughter, Ann. Olivia died at her home in San Marino, California on December 20, 1947.

With the outbreak of World War I, Bacon was selected to serve on the local draft board. His term was truncated when he himself was called up to active duty on the medical corps, where he was given the rank of captain.

He was one of the founders of the Arizona State League in 1927, a semi-professional baseball leagues which originally consisted of teams in Miami, Globe, Phoenix, and Mesa. He was their first president. He had organized the Miami Baseball Association in 1921 as its president, which ran the local baseball team, the Miami Miners, in 1921. When the league was re-organized in 1928 to meet the requirements of becoming a Class D level minor league, Bacon served as its vice-president. The Miami and Phoenix teams remained in the league, but the Mesa and Globe teams were replaced by teams from Tucson and Bisbee.

He continued to practice medicine until his retirement in 1952. In 1964 he went to live with his daughter in Pomona, California. Bacon died on June 22, 1964, in Pomona California.
