= Senator Willis =

Senator Willis may refer to:

== Members of the United States Senate ==
- Frank B. Willis (1871–1928), U.S. Senator from Ohio from 1921 to 1928
- Raymond E. Willis (1875–1956), U.S. Senator from Indiana from 1941 to 1947

== United States state senate members ==
- Charles T. Willis (1841–1921), New York State Senate
- Edwin E. Willis (1904–1972), Louisiana State Senate
- John H. Willis (politician) (fl. 1910s), Arizona State Senate
- Parish L. Willis (1838–1917), Oregon State Senate
- R. Holman Willis (1880–1954), Virginia State Senate
- Tom Willis (politician) (fl. 2020s), West Virginia State Senate
- William Willis (Maine politician) (1794–1870), Maine State Senate

== See also ==
- Senator Wills (disambiguation)
