= Frank O. Mattox =

American politician from Arizona

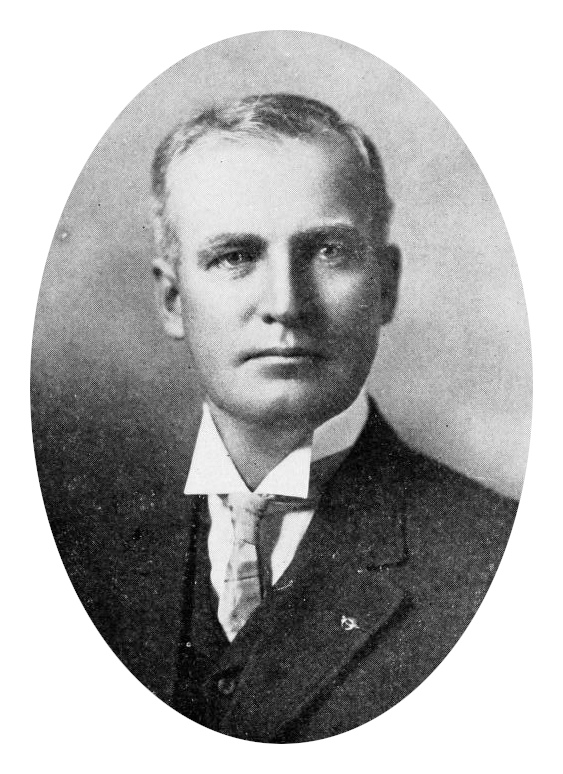

Member of the Arizona House of Representatives from the Navajo County
- In office March 1912 – December 1914
- Preceded by: First representative from Navajo County
- Succeeded by: Sam W. Proctor

Member of the Arizona Senate from the Navajo County district
- In office January 1917 – December 1918
- Preceded by: D. D. Crabb
- Succeeded by: W. A. Parr

Personal details
- Party: Democratic
- Spouse: Martha (divorced 1916)
- Profession: Politician

Frank O. Mattox was an American politician from Arizona who served two terms in the Arizona State Legislature. His first term was in the 1st Arizona State Legislature, where he served in the state House of Representatives, as the sole representative from Navajo County. His second term was during the 3rd Arizona State Legislature, where he also represented Navajo County, but this time in the State Senate.

== Biography ==
Mattox worked on the Santa Fe Railroad as a conductor for over 20 years. In 1924 he resigned from the railroad and took a full-time position managing the Hall Lumber Company in Winslow, Arizona. Mattox had been a vice-president of the company for two years prior to accepting the full-time job. Mattox was married, but divorced his wife, Martha A. Mattox, on the grounds of desertion in 1916.

In 1911 he ran for the State House of Representatives for the seat from Navajo County. He defeated Benjamin Downs for the Democrat nomination, and then defeated A. H. Hansen in the general election in December. In May 1912, during the third special session of the legislature, Mattox introduced a resolution asking that Arizona ratify the Seventeenth Amendment to the United States Constitution. If it had passed quickly, Arizona would have been the first state to ratify. However, Massachusetts ratified the amendment on May 22, Arizona was the second state, on June 3. He did not run for re-election for the House in 1914, but ran for the State Senate in 1916. He was the only candidate on the Democrat's side. He narrowly defeated Republican E. T. Fanning in the general election, 839 to 810. He did not run for re-election in 1918.
