= Henry Lovin =

American politician from Arizona, United States

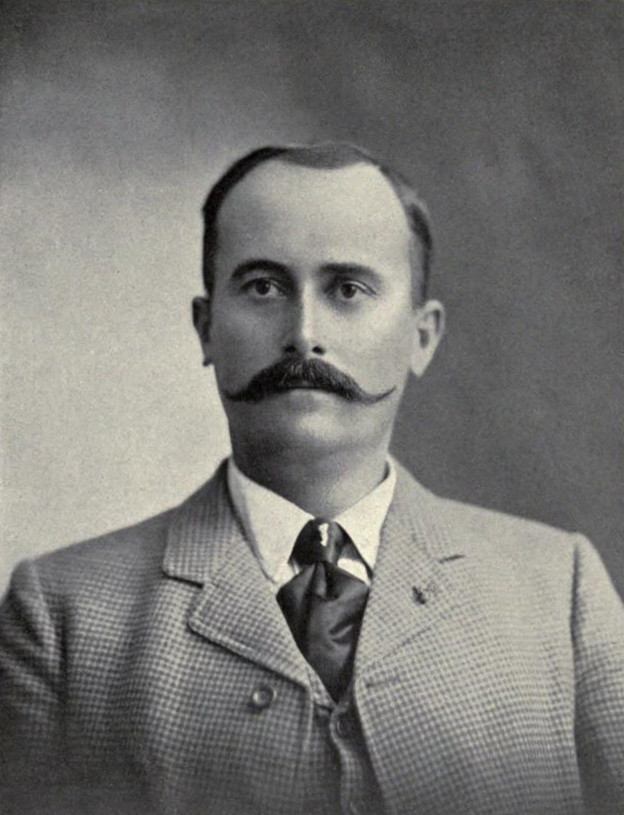

Member of the Arizona Senate from the Mohave County district
- In office March 1912 – January 1917
- Preceded by: First Senator from Mohave County
- Succeeded by: W. P. Mahoney

Personal details
- Born: June 22, 1866 Rockingham, North Carolina, U.S.
- Died: December 29, 1931 (aged 65) Kingman, Arizona
- Party: Democratic

Henry Lovin was a politician from Arizona who served in the 1st and 2nd Arizona State Legislatures. He ran several large mercantile businesses, was heavily into the mining industry, and owned both cattle ranches in Arizona and an alfalfa ranch in California.

== Life ==
Lovin was originally from Richmond County, North Carolina, being born in Rockingham on June 22, 1866. He moved to Arizona in 1887, settling in Phoenix, where he planted the first orange grove in the Salt River Valley. After two years he moved to Prescott, and moved again in 1891 to Kingman, where he remained for the remainder of his life. In addition to his main residence in Kingman, Arizona, Lovin also owned an alfalfa ranch in southern California. He married Miss Ruby Roe on March 21, 1897. They had two daughters. His wife died unexpectedly in January 1911, after a brief illness. The illness was not considered major, but she developed auto-toxemia, where your body develops poisons within your system, which led to her death. In December 1922, Lovin remarried. The bride's name was Ora R. Thompson, who had arrived from Louisiana five years earlier, and was working as a clerk of the county board of supervisors.

In 1896 he began to become involved in the mining industry, having several different partners and properties. One of his projects, in which he was partners with Judge Redman, was sold for $80,000 in 1898, Redman and Lovin owned 3/8 of the property. In 1900, he sold two of his mining properties, both of which he was half-owner of, his share of both sales was $25,000 each. The one mine, "The Gold Road", turned into one of the biggest gold mines in Arizona after the sale. Also in 1900 he was one of the founding members of the Kingman Volunteer Fire Company. In late 1901, he and two partners, Judge Redman and H. L. Harris, discovered another rich load of gold ore, in Secret Pass on Blue Ridge Mountain, on the other side of the mountain from The Gold Road mine. With easier access than The Gold Road, it was expected to be quite a large enterprise. During the 1900s Lovin continued to be involved in many mining projects throughout the area, such as the Hillside and Rico mines. In 1906, Lovin, with another group of investors, incorporated the Scott's Lucky Boy Consolidated Mining Company. The company was formed to further develop the Lucky Boy Group of mines, which had been being worked for several years, and was expected to be one of the best in the United States. In 1906, Lovin partnered with the Clack Brothers and brought a lead mine which had been worked for several years, and developed it into a highly productive lead producer.

In 1905 he opened a brewery and ice factory in Kingman, which became one of the largest in the territory. He would run the ice company until his death. In 1906 he entered into an agreement with the Hercules Mercantile Company to open stores in Kelvin and Ray, Arizona.

In addition to his mining and mercantile interests, Lovin was also into cattle ranching, where he had a large spread in the Big Sandy area. In 1917, Lovin expanded his cattle holdings with the purchase of the Round Valley Cattle company. The purchase for $100,000 of the property was the largest of its kind in Mohave County at that time. He followed this up with the purchase of R. A. McKaskle ranch, another large ranch also in the Big Sandy area, in 1917.

Lovin died in his home in Kingman on December 29, 1931.

== Political career ==
In 1894, Lovin ran on the Democratic ticket for constable of Mohave County. He also worked as a salesman for Taggart Mercantile Company, and was a stagecoach driver. In September 1898 he attempted to get the Democratic nomination for the Mohave County Treasurer position. In either late 1898 or early 1899 he was named deputy sheriff of Mohave County.

In 1900, he announced his intention to run for Mohave County Sheriff. He selected to represent the Democrats in the primary that year, and won by a large margin over his Republican opponent in the November general election. In 1902, he announced his intention to run for re-election as Mohave County Sheriff, he received the nomination from the Democrats and was re-elected in the November election.

At the state Democratic convention in 1910, Lovin was nominated as their delegate to the Arizona constitutional convention. Since the Republicans did not nominate anyone from Mohave County, it was expected that Lovin would be the delegate, even though there were two other nominees, one each from Labor and Socialist parties. When the election was held in September 1910, Lovin was selected as the sole delegate from Mohave County, and while a member he served on the following committees: Suffrage and Elections; Mines and Mining; Public Debt; and Revenue and Taxation. In September 1911, Lovin announced his intention to run for the state senate, as the sole senator from Mohave County. He won the Democratic primary in October, and won the general election in December, becoming he first state senator in Arizona from Mohave County. During the first session, Lovin authored a bill which provided the ability to Mohave County to raise $80,000 through a bond issuance in order to build a county courthouse in Mohave.

In June 1914, Lovin announced that he would be seeking re-election to the state senate. Lovin beat his Democratic opponent, Dan Angius, in the September primary 629–420, and he won in November's general election, besting the Republican candidate, W. H. Bucher, by a count of 905 to 473. The Socialist candidate, Paul E. White, received 154 votes. Lovin chose not to run for a third term in 1916.

In 1924 he was elected to the Mohave County Board of Supervisors, where he remained a supervisor until his death in 1931.
