= W. P. Mahoney =

American politician (1882–1967)

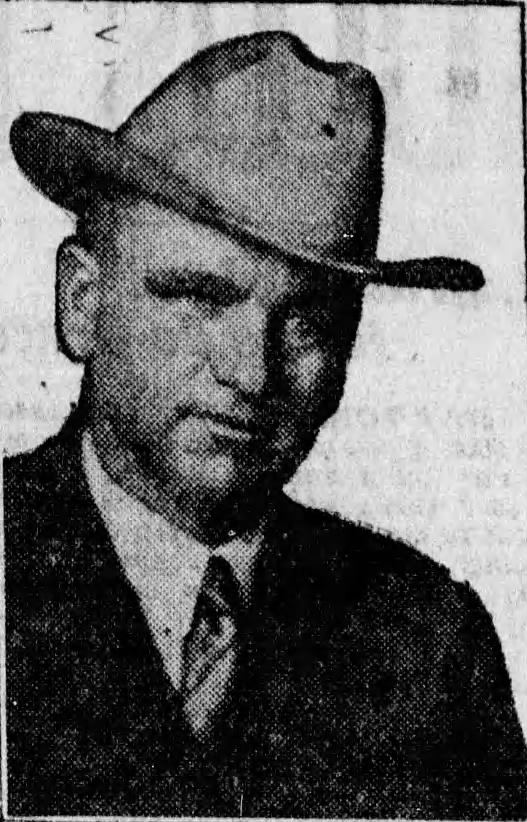
- Mahoney, ca. 1926

Member of the Arizona House of Representatives from the Mohave County
- In office January 1915 – December 1916
- Preceded by: John Ellis
- Succeeded by: Jasper N. Brewer

Member of the Arizona Senate from the Mohave County district
- In office January 1917 – December 1918
- Preceded by: Henry Lovin
- Succeeded by: C. W. Herndon

Personal details
- Born: 1882 Newport, County Mayo, Ireland
- Died: July 31, 1967 (aged 85) Phoenix, Arizona, U.S.
- Party: Democratic
- Spouse: Alice M. Fitzgerald
- Children: 4, including William P. Mahoney Jr.
- Relatives: Richard Mahoney (grandson)

William P. Mahoney (1882 – July 31, 1967) was an American lawyer and politician who served in the Arizona House of Representatives from 1915 to 1916 and in the Arizona Senate from 1917 to 1918, as a member of the Democratic Party. After his tenure in the state legislature he served as the sheriff of Mohave County, Arizona.

Mahoney was born in Newport, County Mayo, Ireland, and immigrated to the United States in 1900. He was active in mining in Arizona, Colorado, Montana, and Nevada, during which time he met Wyatt Earp. He started working for the Santa Fe Railway in 1926. Mohney was elected to the state house in the 1914 election and state senate in the 1916 election before being elected as a county sheriff. He unsuccessfully ran for the Democratic nomination for Arizona State Mine Inspector in the 1926 election.

Mahoney was appointed to the Department of Social Security and Public Welfare in 1937 and later served as its chair before resigning in 1952. He was appointed to the Arizona Employment Security Commission in 1955 and served until 1959.

== Early life ==
W. P. Mahoney was born in Newport, County Mayo, Ireland in 1882, and immigrated to the United States in 1900. He married Alice M. Fitzgerald, with whom he had four children including William P. Mahoney Jr., on June 30, 1915, at St. Mary's Church. Mahoney met her while serving in the legislature, as Fitzgerald was the secretary to the president of the senate, M. G. Cunniff. He is the grandfather of Richard Mahoney.

== Career ==
=== Business ===
Mahoney spent his time working in the mines in Cripple Creek, Colorado, Butte, Montana, Tonopah, Nevada, and several locations in northwest Arizona in the 1900s. He became acquainted with Wyatt Earp while at Goldfield, Arizona. He continued to work in the mining field in the Oatman area during the 1910s, as well as having interests in ranching properties. Mahoney and his family moved from Oatman to Kingman, Arizona in 1918, after he was elected sheriff. The house they built and lived in was added to the National Register of Historic Places in 1986.

In 1921, Mahoney and two partners formed the New Comstock Consolidated Mining Company, which owned several claims in Mohave County east of the Gold Chain Mine. Mahoney accepted a job as a divisional special agent for the Santa Fe Railroad in December 1926. Since the position was based in Winslow, Arizona, he moved there in 1927.

During the 1932 presidential election, Mahoney was the security expert assigned to meet the train carrying Franklin D. Roosevelt to Arizona. In 1936, he was promoted from special agent for the railroad to head of the lease and livestock agency within the railroad for all of Arizona. Mahoney, who had been living in Winslow, moved to Phoenix, Arizona, where the agency was headquartered.

=== Politics ===
On the day Arizona became a state, February 14, 1912, Mahoney was among those who accompanied Governor George W. P. Hunt on his walk to open the new capitol. He ran for a seat in the Arizona House of Representatives from Mohave County during the 1914 election. He defeated John Ellis and W. E. Moroney in the Democratic primary and Republican nominee F. A. Wilde and Socialist nominee Samuel T. Ryan in the general election, receiving 744, 523, and 181 votes, respectively. He ran to succeed Henry Lovin in the Arizona Senate in the 1916 election. He defeated Dan Angius and Kean St. Charles in the Democratic primary and Republican nominee H. R. Shannon and Socialist nominee Paul E. White in the general election.

He ran for the position of sheriff in Mohave County in the 1918 election and won the Democratic nomination against Asa F. Harris before defeating Republican nominee J.N. Cohenour in the election. He defeated independent candidate Fred Brawn in the 1920 election. During the 1922 election he defeated W. B. Stephens in the Democratic primary with it being described as a "heated contest". He was sheriff of Mohave County from 1918 to 1926. He ran against incumbent Arizona State Mine Inspector Tom Foster in the 1926 election, but Foster won against Mahoney in the Democratic primary.

== Later life and death ==
Mahoney was appointed by Governor R. C. Stanford to serve on the Department of Social Security and Public Welfare, later called the Arizona State Board of Public Welfare, in 1937. He was reappointed to the board in 1940. In 1943, he became chairman of the board and held the position until he left. He resigned from the board in April 1952, which was ahead of the end of his term in January 1954. He was appointed by Governor Ernest McFarland to serve on the Arizona Employment Security Commission in 1955. McFarland's successor, Republican Paul Fannin, did not re-appoint Mahoney in 1959. He resigned from his post as lease and livestock agent in 1952. Mahoney died on July 31, 1967, at St. Joseph's Hospital.

== Electoral history ==
1914 Arizona House of Representatives Mohave County Democratic primary
Party	Candidate	Votes	%	±%
Democratic	W. P. Mahoney	405	41.28%	
Democratic	W. E. Moroney	353	35.98%	
Democratic	John Ellis	223	22.73%	
Total votes		981	100.00%	

1914 Arizona House of Representatives Mohave County election
Party	Candidate	Votes	%	±%
Democratic	W. P. Mahoney	744	51.38%	
Republican	F. A. Wilde	523	36.12	
Socialist	Samuel T. Ryan	181	12.50%	
Total votes		1,448	100.00%	

1916 Arizona Senate Mohave County Democratic primary
Party	Candidate	Votes	%	±%
Democratic	W. P. Mahoney	909	61.01%	
Democratic	Dan Angius	403	27.05%	
Democratic	Kean St. Charles	178	11.95%	
Total votes		1,490	100.00%	

1916 Arizona Senate Mohave County election
Party	Candidate	Votes	%	±%
Democratic	W. P. Mahoney	1,241	56.26%	
Republican	H. R. Shannon	656	29.74%	
Socialist	Paul E. White	309	14.01%	
Total votes		2,206	100.00%	

1920 Mohave County Sheriff election
Party	Candidate	Votes	%	±%
Democratic	W. P. Mahoney (incumbent)	1,330	85.53%	
Independent	Fred Brawn	225	14.47%	
Total votes		1,555	100.00%	

1922 Mohave County Sheriff Democratic primary
Party	Candidate	Votes	%	±%
Democratic	W. P. Mahoney (incumbent)	1,117	57.88%	
Democratic	W. B. Stephens	813	42.12%	
Total votes		1,930	100.00%	
