= Rosemary Drachman Taylor =

American author

- Born: May 8, 1899; Phoenix, Arizona
- Died: November 7, 1981 (aged 82)
- Education: University of Arizona
- Alma mater: Stanford University

Rosemary Drachman Taylor (May 8, 1899 – November 7, 1981) was an American author whose works were made into plays, films, radio and television programs.

== Early life and education ==
Taylor was born in Phoenix, Arizona on May 8, 1899, to Mose and Ethel Drachman. When the Drachmans returned to Tucson in the early 1900s, she moved there with them. She first attended the University of Arizona, before transferring to Stanford University, where she graduated with honors in 1922. She was also a member of Phi Beta Kappa. She was married to another writer, John Winchcombe-Taylor.

== Career ==
Early in her career she was a war correspondent for the Tucson Citizen, and covered the Rif War from Morocco. Her novels included Chicken Every Sunday, Ridin' the Rainbow, Bar Nothing Ranch, Come Clean, My Love, and Harem Scare'm.

Taylor wrote the best-selling novel, Chicken Every Sunday in 1943. The book was an autobiographical look at the Mose Drachman family during the early 1900s and was compared to Life With Father. The book was adapted as a play by Julius and Philip G. Epstein in 1944 under the same name. The play ran for 9 months on Broadway from April 1944 to January 1945. The book was further adapted into a film of the same name in 1949 starring Dan Dailey and Celeste Holm. The film had its world premiere in Tucson, at the Fox Theater on February 12, 1949. In addition, the book was adapted into a radio program airing on the NBC Radio Network, beginning in July 1949. Billie Burke was cast in the leading role as Ethel Drachman, while Harry Von Zell played the character of Mose Drachman. Taylor's one stipulation was that the character's last name needed to be changed from Drachman to something else.

Her second novel, Ridin' the Rainbow, was published the next year, in 1944. The novel was also about her family, but whereas the first novel's protagonist was Ethel, the family matriarch, this novel focused on the family's patriarch, Mose, and his various business dealings. The Corpus Christi Caller-Times said the novel was "one of the most amusing personal histories available this season." The Philadelphia Inquirer also gave the novel a positive review, although they did not like it as much as Chicken Every Sunday.

== Death ==
Taylor died on November 7, 1981, from a stroke at her home in Tucson, Arizona.
