= John T. Hughes (politician) =

American politician in Arizona

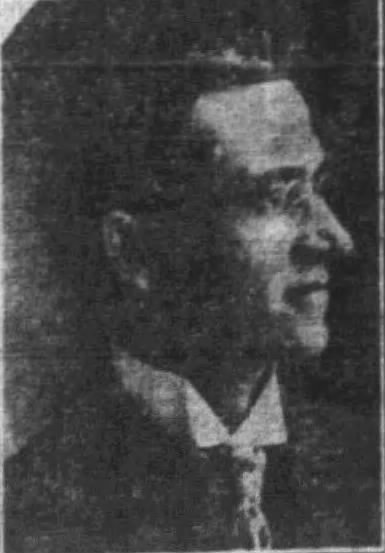
- Hughes, ca. 1911

Member of the Arizona Senate from the Pima County district
- In office March 1912 – January 1915
- Preceded by: First Senator from Pima County
- Succeeded by: Mose Drachman; A. P. Martin

Personal details
- Born: 1873 Tucson, Arizona Territory
- Died: November 14, 1921 (aged 47–48) Tucson, Arizona
- Party: Democratic
- Profession: Politician

John T. Hughes (John Titus Hughes) was a politician from Arizona who served in the 1st Arizona State Legislature. He was also a newspaper man, editing and publishing his father's paper, the Arizona Daily Star, and an attorney, the first native-born Arizonan to be admitted to the Arizona bar. Additionally, he had several mining and real estate interests.

== Early life ==
Hughes was born in Tucson, Arizona in 1874. He was the son of territorial governor, L. C. Hughes, and his mother was Josephine Hughes, who was the leader of the suffragette movement in Arizona, and a friend of Susan B. Anthony. As a young man, Hughes attended the Freehold Institute in Freehold, New Jersey, returning on breaks to his family who lived in Tucson. At the 1891 Arizona Constitutional Convention, Hughes worked as a page.

In 1894 Hughes left Tucson to attend Yale University. While attending Yale, he was given a weekly column in the Arizona Daily Star, which was owned by his father. In 1895 he transferred to the University of Pennsylvania, where he studied law, and graduated from. His relationship with the Star continued over the years, until he became the paper's general manager. He resigned from that position in 1907, when his father sold the paper to W. B. Kelly, the former editor of the Bisbee Daily Review. In 1896 Hughes stumped for the William Jennings Bryan for president throughout Pennsylvania. He also advocated for the free silver cause, of which Bryan was a champion. In 1897 Hughes passed the Pima County bar. He was the first Arizona native admitted to the Arizona bar. In 1898 he decided to settle down in his hometown of Tucson.

== Political career ==
In 1898, the Democrats nominated Hughes to be the Pima County superintendent of schools. However, he lost to the Republican, Ebenezer Williams by a vote of 810–727 in the November general election. When Santa Cruz County was split from Pima County in March 1899, Williams was no longer eligible for the Pima County superintendent, residing in the newly created county. With the position vacant, the county board of supervisors appointed Hughes to the position. In 1908 the Democrats nominated Hughes as one of three candidates to run for the territorial house of representatives. However, in the November general election, only one of those candidates won, William J. Hogwood.

Hughes declared his intent to see the Democrat's nomination for state senator from Pima County in September 1911. The primary was contested between three men, Hughes, A. A. Worsley, and John L. Seamonds. In the primary, Worsley finished first with 378 votes, Hughes came in second with 326, and Seamonds finished third with 210, making Worsley and Hughes the Democrat nominees. In December's general election, despite the fact that most of the races in Pima County went to the Republicans, the two Democrats, Worsley and Hughes, defeated their Republican opponents, E. M. Dickerman and G. W. Dietz, to become Pima County's first two state senators. Hughes came in second overall of the four candidates, with 915 votes, with his fellow Democrat Worsley in first with 1,015. The two Republicans, Dickerman and Dietz garnered 862 and 813 votes respectively.

During the 1st Legislature, Hughes was responsible for numerous bills, some of which were quite impactful. One of them was a bill which allocating $150,000 to the University of Arizona, which provided for the purchase of 300,000 acres of land for college of agriculture and school of mines, as well as constructing a new building for the college of agriculture. He authored a bill which changed the way primaries were conducted in the state. During the 1911 elections, primary ballots only included candidates of a single party. Hughes' bill changed that so every ballot included the candidates from all parties. He also passed a bill which allowed the state to regulate weights and measures. He was also the author of the resolution which led to Arizona becoming the twenty-ninth state to ratify the Sixteenth Amendment to the United States Constitution. His measure to add a referendum allowing the public to vote on adding an amendment to the constitution allowing women's suffrage, failed to pass the senate by one vote. He was very well-respected in the legislature, being considered a fine orator, but he was not a physically strong individual, suffering from several maladies over the years, including rheumatism and "affliction of the eyes". He would occasionally spend time at various locations recovering from illnesses.

During the second and third special sessions of the legislature in 1913, Hughes was able to get several important measures passed. One was the Municipal Abattoir Bill, which after a hard fight in the senate, passed the house without a dissenting vote. As originally written, the state attorney general said that it advocated the confiscation of private property (the slaughterhouses), so the act was amended to make participation voluntary. There were several other amendments before passage, but as passed it would regulate the sanitary conditions of the slaughterhouse industry in Arizona. He also authored and shepherded a bill which funds for construction of new buildings at the University of Arizona. The $100,000 paid for five buildings on campus: an agriculture building, a shop building, an auditorium and museum, a mining building, and a building to house the club activities of the student body. He also successfully championed a bill which deeded state lands to the Desert Botanical Laboratory. The land deeded was being leased by the laboratory, but in order to build on it, they needed clear title. Hughes also authored a bill to eliminate capital punishment in Arizona, but it did not pass the legislature.

In June 1914, Hughes announced his intention to run for re-election to the state senate. However, in August Hughes dropped out of the race. At the time there were four people who were running for the two Democrat nominations, besides Hughes there was Andrew P. Martin, Mose Drachman, and R. N. Leatherwood. His stated reason was for the good of the party, and therefore his withdrawal would provide less friction during the primary. In July 1916, Hughes announced his intention to run once again for the state senate. As there was only a single other Democrat running in the primary, J. W. Buchanan, the two men were assured of the Democrat nomination, and both ran in that November's general election. However, while Buchanan won, Hughes was defeated by Republican F. O. Goodell.

== Career outside politics ==
Hughes, along with several partners, incorporated the Copper Mountain Mining Company in 1903, to explore, mine and process ore. In 1904 and 1905 he entered into several real estate projects. The first was the organization of the Riverside Land & Development Company, which entailed the development of 1000 one-acre lots on property located between Main Street and the Santa Cruz River, north of the Southern Pacific Railroad line. His real estate interests were not confined to Arizona, as in January 1905 he joined a group of 3 other investors to develop property in Oceanside, California. Later that year, he formed a corporation with several other partners called The Arizona Home Starters Association, which was established to purchase and develop real estate projects, as well as potentially developing mercantile and industrial entities. He also owned orange groves outside of Los Angeles. In 1909, he, his father, and another two partner, formed a mining company, Gold Bullion Mines. Their property was located sixty-fives southwest of Tucson, and consisted of twenty-four claims, which produced gold, silver, and molybdenum. After his father's death in November 1915, Hughes was elected the president of the company in January 1916.

In 1912, Hughes incorporated the Imperial Mines Company, with his partner, E. S. Tryon. In 1916 Hughes endowed a scholarship for the law department at the University of Arizona, and named it after his father.

While running for the senate in 1916, Hughes was the lead defense attorney in the murder trial of three Pima County Deputies: Joe Wiley, Thomas Jones, and Ramon Salazar. The three were accused of murdering a Mrs. Bates near Tucson. The three men were convicted of second degree murder and sentenced to 10 years to life in October 1916. In the general election, while Buchanan won, Hughes lost to F. O. Goodell.

Following his departure from the state senate, Hughes resumed his legal career, as well as looking after several business interests. During a murder trial in 1916, another serious illness once again forced him to retire to a facility to recuperate. Although he did win a decision from the state supreme court to grant his clients bail while they awaited trial. After George W. P. Hunt seemingly lost the 1916 gubernatorial election to Thomas Edward Campbell, Hughes was part of the legal team which successfully challenged the election results. In 1918 Governor Hunt appointed Hughes to serve as a regent for the University of Arizona, and in September of that year, he was elected to be chancellor of the school. While chancellor, he was responsible for the creation and building of the university's School for the Deaf and Blind.

He had been ill for several years, but continued to practice law right up till a few days before his death on November 14, 1921.

A year after his death his mother, Josephine, donated a 40-volume bound set of the complete publications of the Arizona Star, which had been founded by Hughes' father, to the University of Arizona in John's name. Several groups, including the Southwest Museum in Los Angeles, and the Pioneers Society had both sought to obtain the set, but Mrs. Hughes felt that preservation was best served by donating it to the university.
