= W. A. Parr =

American politician from Arizona

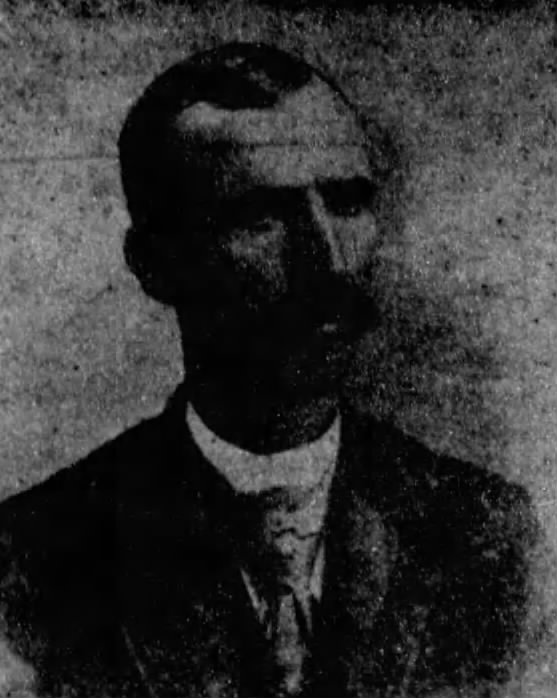
- Parr, ca. 1920

Member of the Arizona Senate from the Navajo County district
- In office January 1919 – December 1920
- Preceded by: F. O. Mattox
- Succeeded by: James Scott

Personal details
- Party: Democratic
- Profession: Politician

W. A. Parr (1855 – May 25, 1922) was an American politician from Arizona. He served a single term in the Arizona State Senate during the 4th Arizona State Legislature, holding the seat from Navajo County. In addition, he served two terms in the Arizona Territorial Legislature, both in the lower house. He was a contractor and an undertaker.

== Biography ==
Parr was born in Canada in 1855. Parr moved to Arizona in 1891, settling in Winslow. Parr was a building contractor in both Arizona and New Mexico, as well as running an undertaking business in Winslow. In the mid-1890s, Parr served as the justice of the peace for the Winslow district.

He served in the 20th and 22nd Arizona Territorial Legislatures, both time in the House. During the 20th Legislature, his eight-year-old daughter, Essee, served as his page in the House. In 1900 he ran for the 21st Arizona Territorial Legislature, but this time for the upper house, which was called the council during the time Arizona was a territory. However, he lost narrowly to Republican Colin Campbell in the general election. In 1902 he again ran for the legislature, this time for the House, defeating Republican J. F. Mahoney in the general election. He did not run for re-election in 1904.

In December 1902 his wife died of "congestion of the brain" after an illness of several weeks. The couple had two children, both girls, Essie and Vina Alberta.

In 1904 Parr was elected to the Winslow City Council. On July 27, 1904, Parr remarried, this time to Frona A. Philipps of Lineville, Iowa, where the wedding was held. In 1914 Parr ran for State Treasurer. However, he was soundly defeated in the primary by fellow Democrat Mit Simms. In 1918, Parr announced his intention to run for the Arizona State Senate. He was opposed in the Democrat primary by C. C. McCauley. He defeated McCauley in the primary, and went on to win the general election in November. He did not run for re-election in 1920.

In May 1922, Parr was working on one of his houses in Winslow when he fell from a ladder, seriously injuring himself. He was found unconscious, and was taken to a hospital in Los Angeles. He never regained consciousness and died several days later, on May 25.
