= D. D. Crabb =

American politician in Arizona

Member of the Arizona Senate from the Navajo County district
- In office January 1915 – January 1917
- Preceded by: John H. Willis
- Succeeded by: F. O. Mattox

Personal details
- Party: Republican
- Profession: Politician

Delmore Dean Crabb was an American politician from Arizona who served in the Arizona state senate during the 2nd Arizona State Legislature. In addition to his brief political career, Crabb was a cattle rancher in both Arizona and California.

== Life ==
Crabb was born in 1874 in Iola, Kansas, the son of Joseph D. and Sylvia A. Crabb. He had 3 brothers: Alford ("A. D."), Elbert (also known as "Jack" or "E. H"), and S. V. Crabb; and 2 sisters: Mattie and LaVerne. Crabb moved with his family from Kansas to California in 1887, before moving to Arizona in 1881, where the settled in the Salt River Valley, on a ranch near Phoenix, Arizona, on Christy Road. Crabb grew up on that ranch before graduating from North Phoenix High School, after which he managed the Alkire Cattle Ranch for several years, before starting his own ranch. One of his brothers, E. H. ("Jack") Crabb was also a prominent cattle rancher, being the long time manager of the Coconino Cattle Company, near Jerome. Another brother, A. D. Crabb (Alford) was also a prominent rancher near Phoenix. He was killed on his ranch in a horse-riding accident in 1918, while roping cattle. He married Jennie Root on December 22, 1897. The couple had a daughter, Zelda, in 1898. While giving birth to son, Anderson, in 1900, Jennie died from complications from the birth.

He remarried on August 19, 1903, to Mary Margaret Earle. Mary Margaret adopted Crabb's daughter, Zelda. He operated ranches near Flagstaff and Phoenix. In June 1910 the couple had a daughter., Genevieve. By 1909 he had his own ranch in Skull Valley. Later that year, Crabb and a partner, John Hurley, purchased a large ranch, the Burnt Ranch, west of Prescott. They created the Burnt Ranch Land and Cattle Company. The firm made another large deal in August 1910 when they purchased the Hopen Land and Cattle Company near Pinedale in Navajo County for an estimated $100,000. The company continued to expand over the next few years, including the purchase of the large cattle property of Joe Rudy in the Skull Valley area in March 1911. Upon the purchase of the Burnt Ranch, the Crabbs moved to Pinedale, but retained a residence in Phoenix where the family could spend the winters.

In August 1914, Crabb declared his intent to run for the state senate seat from Navajo County. He was one the lone Republican vying for the nomination for the single seat. Being unopposed in the Republican primary, Crabb became their nominee. In the general election, he defeated Democrat James M. Flake, and became the sole Republican in not just the state senate, but in the entire 2nd Arizona State Legislature. He was appointed to several committees during the first session of the legislature: Judiciary; Appropriations; Constitutional Amendments and Referendum; Suffrage and Elections; Agriculture and Irrigation; Live Stock; and State Accounting and Methods of Business.

In March 1916, Crabb sold his portion of the Hopen and Cattle Company to his partners. The sale of his interest also coincided with his moving from his ranch home in Pinedale to a new ranch in Aguila.

The Crabbs moved to Escondido, California, in 1937, where Delmore began operating a small cattle ranch. Webb was a charter member of San Diego Yacht Club. Crabb died on May 16, 1947, in San Diego, California.
