= Samuel Drachman =

Arizona pioneer, businessman, and politician

- Born: 1833; Poland
- Died: December 28, 1911 (aged 77–78)
- Occupations: Businessman, politician
- Office: Arizona Territory House of Representatives
- Term: 1867
- Spouse: Rosa
- Children: Harry Arizona; Mose; Emmanuel; Albert; Lily; Becky; Esther; Phyllis
- Family: Samuel, brother

Samuel Drachman was an Arizona pioneer, businessman, and politician. Drachman was born in Poland in about 1833 and immigrated to the United States in 1852 with his family, including his brother Philip. Drachman then moved to Tucson, Arizona in 1867, following his brother Philip, whom he worked for in his general store until 1873, until he established his own cartage business, carrying mail and supplies for the U. S. government. In the early 1880s, he opened his cigar store, which he continued to operate until his death in 1911. He served in the territorial legislature, in the House of Representatives during the 8th Arizona Territorial Legislature.

He married Jennie Miguel on October 17, 1875. The couple had four children: Herbert, Sol, Lucille, and Myrtle. One of his sons, Sol B. Drachman, was the youngest member of Teddy Roosevelt's Rough Riders during the Spanish-American War, serving in the regiment's Troop B.

Drachman helped to develop Tucson's school system. He served three terms, from 1899 to 1908, on Tucson's District 1 school board.

Drachman died at his home in Tucson on December 28, 1911.
