= Constitution of Arizona =

U.S. state constitution

Constitution of the State of Arizona

Overview
- Jurisdiction: Arizona, United States
- Ratified: December 9, 1910 (original); December 9, 1911 (revised)
- Date effective: February 14, 1912; 114 years ago (on statehood)

History
- Amendments: 151

Full text
- Constitution of Arizona at Wikisource

The Constitution of the State of Arizona is the governing document and framework for the state of Arizona. It is the first and only one adopted by the state of Arizona.

== History ==
The Arizona Territory was authorized to hold a constitutional convention in 1910 at which the constitution was drafted and submitted to Congress. The original constitution was approved by Congress, but subsequently vetoed by President William H. Taft over his objection to the recalling of judges. The constitution was amended by the constitutional convention removing the recalling of judges and resubmitted, upon which President Taft approved Arizona's statehood as the 48th state on February 14, 1912.

Soon after Arizona became a state, the state legislature approved a constitutional amendment which restored the ability to recall judges, which was approved in the 1912 general election.

The delegates to the convention were: Fred Colter (D), representing Apache County; E. M. Doe (R) and C. C. Hutchinson (R), representing Coconino County; E.E. Ellinhwood (D), John Bolan (D), H. B. Sims (D), C. M. Roberts (D), F. R. Bradner (D), Thomas Fenney (D), A. F. Parsons (D), E. A. Tovreau (D), D. L. Cunningham (D), C. F. Connelly (D), representing Cochise County; George W. P. Hunt (D), J. J. Keegan (D), Alfred Kinney (D), John H. McCormick (D), Jacob Weinberger (D), representing Gila County; Lamar Cobb (D), A. R. Lynch (D), Mit Simms (D), A. M. Tuthill (D), William T. Webb (D), representing Graham County; A. C. Baker (D), Lysander Cassidy (D), John Orme (D), Orrin Standage (D), J. E. Crutchfield (D), F. A. Jones (D), Benjamin Baker Moeur (D), Alfred Franklin (D), Sidney Osborn (D), representing Maricopa County; Henry Lovin (D) representing Mohave County; James Scott (R), and William Morgan (D), representing Navajo County; Thomas N. Wills (D) and Elmer Coker (D), representing Pinal County; S. L. Kingman (R), W. F. Cooper (R), George Pusch (R), Carl Jacome (R), and J. C. White (R), representing Pima County; Bracey Curtis (R) representing Santa Cruz; Mulford Winsor (D), F. L. Ingram (D), and C. E. Short (D), representing Yuma County; and E. M. Wells (R), M. G. Cunniff (D), A. A. Moore (D), Homer R. Wood (D), Morris Goldwater (D), and Albert Jones (D), representing Yavapai County.

== Preamble ==
We the people of the State of Arizona, grateful to Almighty God for our liberties, do ordain this Constitution.

== Summary ==
The Arizona Constitution is divided into a preamble and 30 articles, numbered 1–6, 6.1, 7–22, and 25–30, with articles 23 and 24 having been repealed. Article 30 is no longer in force due to being ruled illegal.

- Preamble
- Article 1 declares the boundaries of the state in great detail.
- Article 2 titled the Declaration of Rights and is the state's equivalent of the Bill of Rights. At the time the Arizona Constitution was adopted, the United States Supreme Court had not yet ruled that the Bill of Rights in the United States Constitution was applicable to or binding upon the states. In 2024, Article 2 was amended to contain an explicit right to abortion.
- Article 3 declares the state government shall be divided into three distinct divisions, the legislative, executive and judicial.
- Article 4 establishes the legislature and the people through initiative as legislative authority for the state and outlines the qualifications for state House of Representatives and Senate and the division of districts (30 districts to elect 1 senator and 2 representatives).
- Article 5 outlines the qualifications for Governor and other Executive branch officials and to their duties.
- Article 6 frames the court system including the Supreme Court and superior court and qualifications for judges.
- Article 6.1 creates a Commission on Judicial Conduct to oversee the judicial system.
- Article 7 deals with suffrage and elections.
- Article 8 provides the method of removal from office for all elected officials including judges, legislators, and executive officials either through impeachment or recall.
- Article 9 provides taxation powers to the legislature and limits the amount of debt for the state's political divisions.
- Article 10 concerns the usage of state and school lands.
- Article 11 concerns education in the state and that all public schools be free. Establishes Board of Education and Superintendent of Public Instruction.
- Article 12 deals with the counties of the state.
- Article 13 deals with cities, towns and other municipal corporations.
- Article 14 deals with general corporations.
- Article 15 establishes the Corporation Commission to regulate corporations as well as the rates of public utilities.
- Article 16 concerns the militia and national guard.
- Article 17 declares the common law riparian system of water rights void and reconfirms preexisting appropriated water rights.
- Article 18, as well as Article 25, concerns labor, regulating child labor, defining a work day to be 8 hours, and declaring Arizona a right to work state.
- Article 19 creates the office of State Mine Inspector and the inspection of mines operating in the state.
- Article 20 concern specific topics that while normally outside of Congress's subject jurisdiction, are controlled by Congress. This includes the right to religious freedom, banning of polygamy, public and Indian lands, banning importation of intoxicating liquors onto Indian reserves until 1957, and state officials required to speak, read, and write English, among other things. These sections can only be repealed with the approval of Congress; however, since the U.S. Supreme Court invalidated a similar restriction in Coyle v. Smith, the validity of that rule is unclear.
- Article 21 outlines the mode of amending the Constitution.
- Article 22 deals with scheduling and miscellaneous topics.
- Articles 23 and 24 both concerned prohibition and were repealed in 1932.
- Articles 26, 27, and 29 are short articles dealing with real estate agents, the regulation of ambulances, and public retirement systems. Article 27 specifies that Arizona citizens may not be forced to purchase healthcare or fined for not purchasing such care.
- Article 28 concerns English as the official language.
- Article 29 deals with public retirement systems.
- Article 30 restricts marriage to a man and a woman.

== Oddities ==
Two sections in the Constitutions are duplicated, having resulted from three constitutional amendments being approved in 1992 (Propositions 100, 101, and 107 all amending term limits with Proposition 107 creating a second version in both sections).

- Article 5, Section 1.
- Article 19, Section 1.
- Article 6, Section 2, provides in part, "The [supreme] court shall be open at all times, except on nonjudicial days, for the transaction of business," thus stating that the court is open, except when it is closed.
- Article 9, Section 17, 'institutions' is misspelt as "insitutions". This is due to a typo in a constitutional amendment in the 1980s.
