= Three Links Cattle Company =

Historical ranch in Arizona

Coordinates: 34.2753°N 112.5464°W

The Three Links Cattle Company was a cattle ranching company in Walnut Grove, Arizona. By the 1950s, it was one of the largest cattle ranches in Arizona. It was sold to Rex Ellsworth and his brother, Reed in 1959.
