= James S. Garvin =

American politician

James Stewart Garvin

Member of the Arizona Senate from the Yuma County district
- In office January 1915 – January 1917
- Preceded by: Fred W. Wessel
- Succeeded by: Mulford Windsor

Personal details
- Born: May 3, 1873 Kansas, U.S.
- Died: February 10, 1945 San Bernardino, California, U.S.
- Party: Democratic

James Stewart Garvin was an American politician who served a single term in the Arizona State Senate during the 2nd Arizona State Legislature. He easily defeated his two opponents, William Mulroney, a Socialist, and Andrew White, running as a non-partisan. Garvin received 1137 votes, with White getting 648 and Mulroney 163.

== Life ==
Garvin was born May 3, 1873 in Kansas, the eldest of 6 children of farmer William Wallace Garvin (1842-1925) and Mary Jane Wimberly (1854-1932). He was of Scottish, Irish, and English origin. Garvin was a farmer and cotton broker. Garvin died on February 9, 1945.
