= John H. Willis (politician) =

American politician from Arizona

Member of the Arizona Senate from the Navajo County district
- In office March 1912 – January 1915
- Preceded by: First Senator from Navajo County
- Succeeded by: D. D. Crabb

Personal details
- Party: Republican
- Profession: Politician

John H. Willis was a politician from Arizona who served in the 1st Arizona State Legislature.

== Life ==
Willis lived in Snowflake, Arizona, and in 1892 was nominated by the Republicans for probate judge of Apache County, which contained Snowflake at that time. He was a cattle rancher. Willis married Carrie Haynes on November 26, 1891.

== Political career ==
In 1894, Willis was elected to the Apache County Board of Supervisors. After Navajo County was split from Apache County in 1895, Willis was appointed to serve on the Board of Supervisors of the newly created county. In 1896, when the first election was held, Willis was nominated by the Republicans to serve on the board of supervisors of the new county. The following year, he was selected to serve as the president of that body. In November 1897, Willis resigned from the board of supervisors in order to go on his two-year LDS mission to the Southern States.

Upon return from his mission in 1900, the Republicans nominated Willis once again for the board of supervisors. In the November general election he came in second, slightly in front of Democrat John Hunt, 259–254, giving him one of the two supervisor positions. He was again nominated by the Republicans in 1902 for the board of supervisors, however in the general election he came in third, behind Democrat R. C. Creswell, and his fellow Republican F. F. Flickinger. Creswell received 326 votes, Flickinger 305, and Willis 287. In 1908 he won the Republican nomination to run for the territorial house of representatives, but lost in the general election to Democrat Joseph Peterson, 445–238.

1911 saw Willis nominated for the house of representatives by the Republicans, but this was for the state, not territorial house. Unlike the 1908 election, Willis defeated his Democratic opponent, William Morgan, 398–327. Willis did not run for re-election in 1914.
