= Chicken Every Sunday (novel) =

1943 novel by Rosemary Drachman Taylor

- Author: Rosemary Drachman Taylor
- Language: English
- Subject: Americana
- Genre: Comedy
- Set in: Tucson, Arizona
- Publisher: Whittlesey House
- Publication date: 1943
- Publication place: United States
- Pages: 307

Chicken Every Sunday is a 1943 autobiographical book by Rosemary Drachman Taylor, written while Taylor was living in Ontario, Canada during World War II. It is a humorous look at her family's life in 1900s Tucson, Arizona, and was compared to Life With Father.

The book was adapted as a play by Julius and Philip G. Epstein in 1944 under the same name, which ran for 9 months on Broadway from April 1944 to January 1945.

The book was further adapted into a film of the same name in 1949 starring Dan Dailey and Celeste Holm. The film had its world premiere in Tucson, at the Fox Theater on February 12, 1949. In addition, the book was adapted into a radio program airing on the NBC Radio Network, beginning in July 1949. Billie Burke was cast in the leading role as Ethel Drachman, while Harry Von Zell played the character of Mose Drachman. Taylor's one stipulation was that the character's last name needed to be changed from Drachman to something else.
