= Morris Goldwater =

American businessman and politician (1852–1939)

Morris Goldwater (January 16, 1852 – April 11, 1939) was an American businessman and politician.

== Background ==
Goldwater was born in London, England, United Kingdom. In 1854, Goldwater and his family emigrated to the United States and settled in San Francisco, California. In 1867, Goldwater moved to La Paz, Arizona Territory to work in the mercantile business. Eventually, Goldwater moved to Prescott, Arizona Territory and opened the M. Goldwater & Bros. Store with his brothers Baron and Henry. In 1872 he opened another store in Phoenix. Goldwater served on the Prescott City Council and as mayor. He also served on the Yavapai County, Arizona Board of Supervisors and was involved with the Democratic Party. Goldwater served on the board of school examiners for Yavapai County. In 1883 and 1898, Goldwater served on the Arizona Territorial Council and served as president of the territorial council in 1898. In 1910, Goldwater served in the Arizona Constitutional Convention. In 1914 and 1915, Goldwater served in the Arizona Senate and was the president of the senate in 1914. Goldwater was a Freemason and active in both the York Rite and Scottish Rite appendant bodies. Goldwater died at his home in Prescott, Arizona. His nephew was United States Senator Barry Goldwater.

== See also ==
- List of mayors of Prescott, Arizona
