= Arizona Territory capitals =

Capital cities of pre-statehood Arizona

Coordinates: 34.05°N 111.09°W

The capital of the Arizona Territory was established in Prescott, but was moved to Tucson, back to Prescott, and finally to Phoenix over 25 years as political power shifted as the territory grew, developed, and stabilized. Each move was controversial.

== Background and first Prescott capital ==
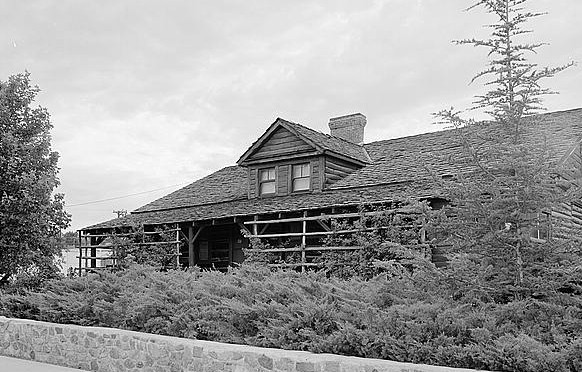
First Territorial Capital and Governor's Mansion, 1864

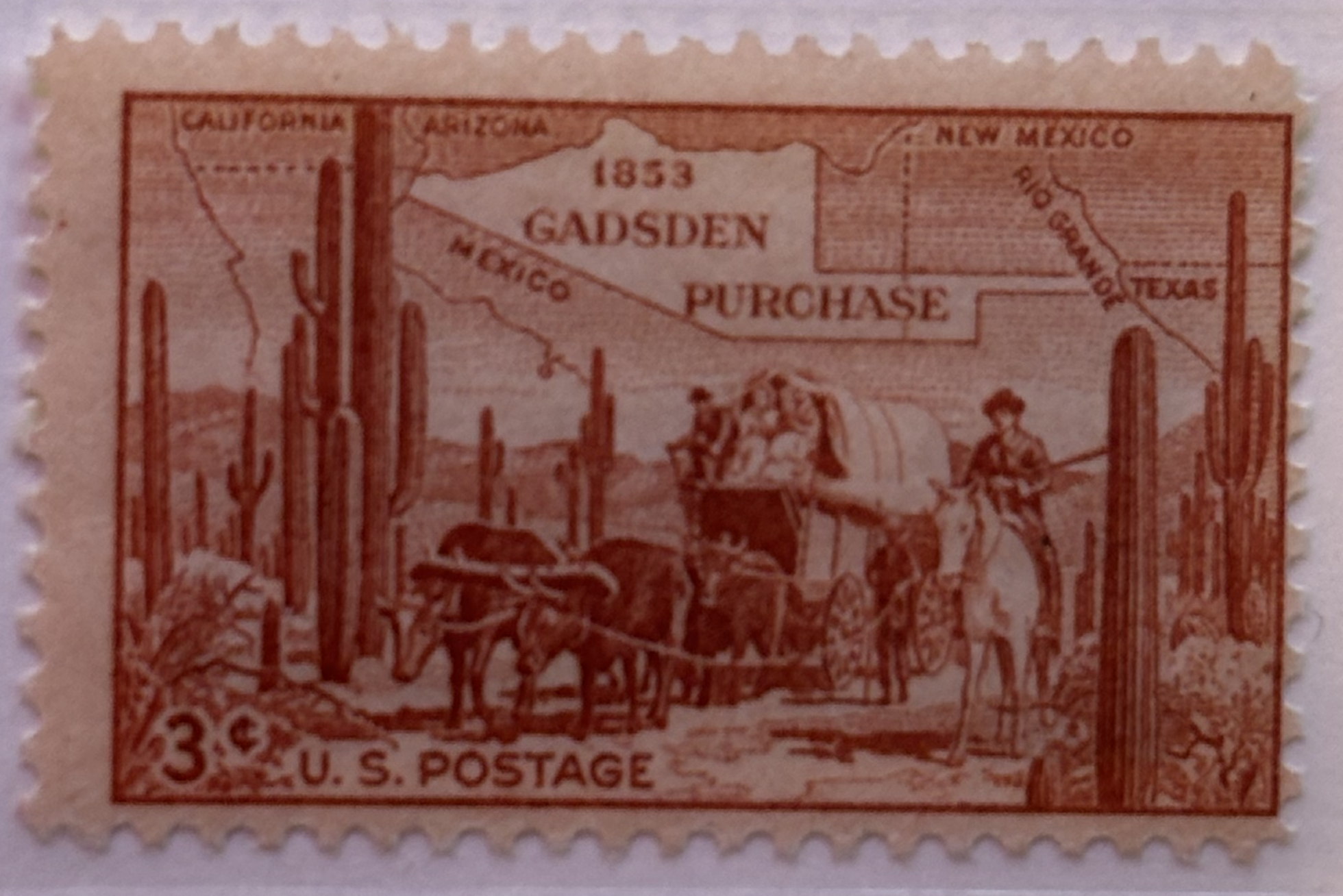
US Stamp SC #1068 Front Gadsden Purchase 1953

After the Gadsden Purchase expanded the New Mexico Territory in 1853, there were several proposals for a division of the territory and the organization of a separate Arizona Territory. No proposal succeeded for a nearly decade until the American Civil War when the southern part of the territory, more under the influence of southern sympathizers, attempted to secede and join the Confederate States of America. The United States Congress then partitioned the territory into the Arizona Territory in the west with New Mexico retaining the eastern part. This had the effect of splitting the area with confederate sympathy.

Conflict over the location of the capital began immediately. The bill passed in March 1862 by the United States House of Representatives to create Arizona stipulated that the capital would be in Tucson, located in the southern part of the territory. The final bill, the Arizona Organic Act, passed by the United States Senate in February 1863 and signed into law by President Abraham Lincoln on February 24, 1863, included no such language.

Territorial officials, en route to Arizona in 1863 to establish its government, arrived at Fort Union in New Mexico after a ten-week journey over the Santa Fe Trail. There they discussed a location for the Arizona capital with post commander General James Henry Carleton who argued against Tucson. Carleton felt that although Tucson was the most populous city in the territory, it suffered from strong Confederate and Mexican influences and recommended that the capital be located in the northern Union-controlled area. He suggested the geographic center of the territory where a gold rush was attracting miners to the Walker Mining District. The prior month, Carleton sent troops there to protect the miners and established Fort Whipple, near present-day Chino Valley. Governor John N. Goodwin heeded the advice and traveled to the fort, arriving on January 20, 1864.

Goodwin shortly concluded that the site was too far from the mining settlements on Granite Creek, Lynx Creek, and Hassayampa Creek and too far from timber sources needed for buildings. After a month, Goodwin took a party of 84, including a military escort, to explore the area and search for a better location. He decided to move Fort Whipple 14 miles (23 km) south to its present location on Granite Creek and established the territorial capital two miles further south in what became Prescott. Goodwin's decision was relayed to General Carleton who agreed and ordered the fort moved.

While the Governor had chosen Prescott as the site of the capital, the 1st Arizona Territorial Legislature, which met in September 1864, had the authority to move it and considered doing so. Two other locations were proposed, La Paz, along the Colorado River at the state's western border with California, and a new community named Aztlan to be located at the juncture of the Salt and Verde rivers in central Arizona. Efforts to move the capital to either location failed.

== Tucson ==
The capital remained in Prescott for several years until the 4th Arizona Territorial Legislature and Governor Richard C. McCormick moved it to Tucson in 1867. The move was controversial; Prescott residents were angered and accused several members of the legislature of accepting bribes and Governor McCormick of selling his support for the bill in exchange for assistance in his election to become the territorial delegate to Congress. No evidence of actual wrongdoing was ever produced and the capital was officially moved on November 1, 1867. Tucson at the time was the most developed city in the territory and it may have been felt that locating the capital there would help reduce Confederate sympathy in the southern part of the territory.

The 8th Arizona Territorial Legislature in 1875 voted to make Tucson the "permanent" capital.

== Prescott, second tenure ==
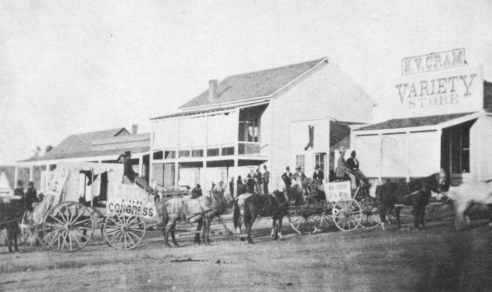
The legislature met in the two story building (center) in Prescott (photo c. 1876)

The capital was in Tucson for only a decade before the 9th Arizona Territorial Legislature, in 1877, in its first action and despite the prior legislature's naming Tucson the permanent capital, voted to return it to Prescott effective January 1, 1879. Prescott had considerable political strength at the time, with twelve representatives in the legislature from Yavapai County, while second-place Pima County (the southern home of Tucson) had only seven.

The matter of the capital's location was still not settled and was re-visited in the 10th Arizona Territorial Legislature which met in January 1879. A bill was introduced to move the capital to Phoenix in centrally located Maricopa County, but it died in committee.

After reapportionment of the legislative districts per the 1880 census, Pima County had 16 representatives, Maricopa with 5, and Yavapai with 4. The 11th Arizona Territorial Legislature met in January 1881 and considered the issue again. Prescott, although a prosperous mining community, was far from the population centers of the territory (Phoenix and Tucson), was difficult to reach without railroad access, and had harsh winter weather. Bills were introduced to move the capital to Tucson, Phoenix, and "at the geographical center of this Territory". Tucson argued that Pima County was the ideal location because it had a large population, much mining wealth, was on the Southern Pacific Railroad, and had a favorable climate. Phoenix countered that it was prosperous agricultural area and the population midpoint of the territory.

Prescott realized that for it to keep the capital, it would have to counter Tucson and Phoenix by gaining support from other areas. The new town of Tombstone in Pima County wanted to split off as Cochise County with Tombstone as the county seat. The Prescott and Tombstone representatives agreed to support each other as well as to jointly fight a bill that would rescind the "Bullion Tax" on mined ore that provided significant revenue to those towns.

The creation of Cochise County passed with full support of Yavapai County, but the Bullion Tax did not receive full support from the Tombstone delegation, and it was repealed. A bill to move the capital to Tucson passed the lower house but failed in the upper house (then called the council) with the Prescott–Tombstone alliance held together. Proposals for the matter to be decided by a vote of the people, or to be decided by the U.S. Congress both failed to gain support.

The next meeting of the legislature was the Twelfth in 1883 where one measure to move the capital to Phoenix died late in the session.

== 13th Legislature proposals ==
The Thirteenth Legislature of 1885 addressed the issue again. Prior to the legislative session, a group of Tucson businessmen had raised a $5,000 slush fund to lobby for the return of the territorial capital. Before the Tucson delegates, delayed by flooding on the Salt River, forcing a detour through Los Angeles and Sacramento, California could reach Prescott, an alliance of representatives met privately and agreed to keep the capital in Prescott in exchange for support of other items. Proponents of moving the capital centered on the inaccessibility of Prescott in the winter, when it was often necessary to reach Prescott from southern Arizona via Los Angeles. Legislators who traveled that way were reimbursed thirteen cents per mile for up to a 2,200 mile round-trip.

The Prescott and Arizona Central Railway was proposed that year to connect Prescott with the Atlantic and Pacific Railroad that crossed northern Arizona. A subsidy for construction of $292,000 was approved by the legislature, with the backing of Jerome mining interests including Governor Frederick Tritle. The railroad would be a benefit to the mines, as well as make Prescott more easily reached. Prescott supporters hoped this would end attempts to move the capital elsewhere.

Tucson and Phoenix still wanted to host the capital. This legislature was allocating funds for many major projects. There were many rumors about delegations making deals, such as Tucson supporting moving the capital to Phoenix in exchange for receiving an insane asylum. The asylum was put in Phoenix, a normal school (teachers college) went to Tempe (near Phoenix), the territorial prison was kept in Yuma, and a bridge was built across the Gila River in Florence. While the Tucson delegation had been working to move the capital to Tucson, near the end of the session the Tucson Arizona Weekly Citizen said Tucson should have the territory university instead of the capital. A vote to move the capital to Tucson failed with all but one of the alliance members voting "nay" as pledged. The alliance also succeeded in all their other objectives (preventing a new Sierra Bonita County to be split from Cochise County, keeping the prison in Yuma, not regulating railroad fares) except one, a bill to disfranchise Mormons. A final bill established the University of Arizona in Tucson.

== 14th Legislature proposals ==
No action was taken in the Fourteenth Legislature of 1887 by Tucson. There was concern by some prominent citizens of Tucson that another attempt could hinder development of the university. This, coupled with the new railroad connection from Prescott to Prescott Junction (now Seligman), caused both Tucson newspapers to advocate keeping the capital in Prescott.

However, the Maricopa County member of the Council proposed a bill to move the capital to Phoenix. A Prescott newspaper claimed this was just a ploy to bargain for additional funding for the asylum. Some in Tucson felt Phoenix should be satisfied with the asylum and normal school. In the end, no action was taken.

== Phoenix ==
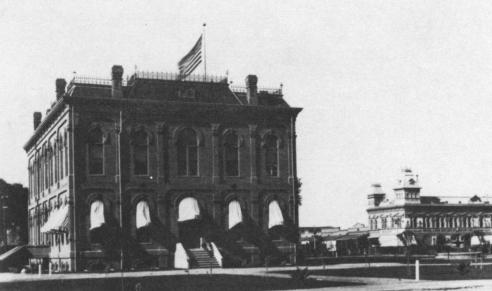
Phoenix City Hall, used as the capitol when the capital was first moved to the city

The political climate relating to the location of the capital had changed by 1889 when the Fifteenth Legislature met. The southern counties realized that Yavapai County could be defeated if they worked together to move the capital from northern Arizona. The movement centered around Phoenix, with better climate, proximity to the major population centers of the territory, rail connection to the Southern Pacific Railroad. In addition, supporters said Phoenix had better restaurants and hotels, and the City Hall had space to temporarily house the capital functions.

Phoenix sought to exchange support with other areas for such things as additional funding for the Yuma prison and Tucson university ($50,000), and the separation of northeastern Yavapai County. It also provided money, as much as $10,000, to influence the votes of southern delegates.

Prescott, although vigorously opposed to relocation, had little practical means to resist. Prescott claimed that Tucson supported the move to Phoenix only because they believed Prescott would support a future move to Tucson to avenge Phoenix. Prescott also claimed that by supporting the various appropriations, Phoenix was buying votes (and the capital) with territorial debt. They argued that Prescott should keep the capital since Phoenix and Tucson had the other public institutions, and that Prescott was near the geographic center of the territory and in spite of harsh winters, lacked the desert summers of Phoenix and therefore had a better year-round climate.

Tucson supported the move but had sympathy for Prescott, suggesting that the asylum be moved there in exchange. Tucson newspapers noted that the issue had been a "disturbing and corrupting element in territorial politics" and should be permanently settled.

The legislature met in Prescott January 22, 1889 and passed a bill to move the capital to Phoenix in both houses within days before adjourning to resume in Phoenix on February 7. The bill, Legislative Act No. 1, was signed by Governor Zulick on January 26. There were celebrations in Phoenix as the legislators rode a special train to Los Angeles and then back to Phoenix. Prescott newspapers alleged bribery by Phoenix and complicity by Governor Zulick.

Prescott was even more disappointed because the move was effective immediately instead of January 1, 1891 (the start of the next legislature) which would have been customary. Despite the charges and complaints, Phoenix became Arizona's fourth and final capital.

== Legends ==
A popular legend about the 1889 vote to move the capital to Phoenix says that the block intending to move held a one-vote lead in the house before the vote. Delegate Charlie Warren of Bisbee engaged a lady of the evening the night before the vote. He supposedly placed his glass eye in a glass of water and later mistakenly swallowed the eye when he awoke thirsty and took a drink. Refusing to appear in public without the eye, he refused to vote which would have kept the capital in Prescott. The prostitute eventually persuaded a friend with a glass eye to loan it to Warren, who then cast the tie-breaking vote to secure the capital for Phoenix. This story cannot be true as there was no one named Charlie Warren in the legislature and furthermore, there was no one-vote margin (13–9 and 9–2 in the two chambers).

In another variation of the tale, attributed to Arizona state historian Marshall Trimble, the legislator was from Yavapai County and the prostitute swallowed the eye at the behest of the Maricopa County legislators. The delegate, whose vote was needed to keep the capital in Prescott, refused to appear causing the bill to pass and the capital to move to Phoenix.
