= Nellie von Gerichten Smith =

American musician (1871–1952)

Nellie von Gerichten Smith (April 24, 1871 – May 15, 1952) was an American composer, pianist, violinist, and writer who composed two operas.

Smith was born in Sierra County, California, to Cecelia Meta Horeis and Philip Gerichten. Little is known about her education. She married Barnaby Hathaway Smith in 1893 and they moved to Prescott, Arizona, where Barnaby managed the Palace Saloon. During her time in Arizona, Smith made several quilts which remain in Arizona collections today. She eventually returned to California, where she died in 1952.

== Works ==
In addition to composing music and playing violin with an orchestra in San Francisco, Smith wrote an essay about the women of early Arizona which was included in Women of the West, a book edited by Max Binheim and published in 1928. Smith's musical compositions include:

=== Operas ===
- Lily of the Mohawks: Kateri Tekakwitha (text by Edward C. La More)
- Twins of Bistritz

=== Piano ===
- "Calizona"
- "Montezuma"
- "Song of the Pines"
- "Storm in the Grand Canyon"

=== Vocal ===
- "Back to the West"
- "My Happy Home Away Out West"
- "Wait, My Little Darling"
