= Whiskey Row =

Whiskey Row may refer to:

- Whiskey Row, Louisville, street that once served as home to the bourbon industry in Louisville, Kentucky
- Whiskey Row, Prescott, a block in Prescott, Arizona once home to more than 40 saloons during the early 20th century
