= Marshall Trimble =

American historian and singer (born 1939)

Marshall Trimble (born 1939) is an American author, singer, former community college professor, and Arizona's official state historian. In addition to his position as director of Southwest studies at Scottsdale Community College, he is a popular speaker and True West Magazine's question-and-answer man.

== Biography ==
Trimble was born in Mesa, Arizona in 1939. When he was eight, his family left the Salt River Valley and moved to Ash Fork, Arizona where his father worked for the Santa Fe Railroad. Following high school, Trimble enrolled at Phoenix College where he was a member of the nationally ranked baseball team. During those same years he played for the semi-pro Glendale Greys baseball team. The 1956 Greys were runner-up for the Arizona State Semi-pro Baseball Championship.

In February 1957 Trimble dropped out of college and joined the United States Marine Corps. Inspired by a Marine buddy, he purchased his first guitar in 1958 and taught himself to play while listening to records by Johnny Cash, Elvis, and Buddy Holly. His motivation for learning the guitar was to overcome shyness and to attract girls. He returned to college and graduated from Arizona State University in 1961. Two years later Trimble was touring with the Gin Mill Three, a folk group performing Kingston Trio-inspired music. During his travels he took the opportunity to visit a variety of historical sites and museums. While visiting the Little Big Horn Battlefield in Montana in 1968 Trimble made up his mind to become a western historian and writer. He returned to Arizona State University, taking every available course in Arizona and Western history. In 1969 he began teaching at Coronado High School. Teaching American history at first, after two years he was teaching 10 sections of Southwest history. As part of his teaching style, he played his guitar and sang old Johnny Cash songs to demonstrate how folk music and history were interrelated.

In 1972, Trimble was asked to create an Arizona history class at Scottsdale Community College. Within three years it was one of the largest classes at the college and in 1977 he began serving as director of the college Southwest Studies program. After publishing his first book in 1977, he used his guitar and songs to liven up promotional book readings. Since then he has hosted several radio shows, including Trimble’s Tales and The Emmy award-winning television show, Arizona Backroads on KAZT-TV. Trimble has appeared on CBS This Morning, Good Morning America, KAET-TV at ASU and the Nashville Network. He appears several times a year on stage at Prescott's Historic Palace Restaurant and Saloon on Whiskey Row. Trimble has received many honors both as a historian, writer and performer. In 1997, Governor Fife Symington appointed him official State Historian. In 2000, he was selected as one of Arizona's representatives in the Library of Congress’ “Local Legacies.” Two years later he received the first “Copper Star Award” from the State Society of Arizona in Washington, D.C. In 2003 he received the Scottsdale Jaycees “Distinguished Service Award,” That same year he was named a Charter Member of the Arizona Culturekeepers.

In 2004, the Daughters of the American Revolution awarded him their “Medal of Honor” for leadership and patriotism. He was also inducted into the Scottsdale Hall of Fame On December 9, 2010, he sang Arizona at a ceremony at the Arizona State Capitol to commemorate the 100th Anniversary of the signing of the Arizona State Constitution. In 2004 he was inducted into the Arizona Veteran's Hall of Fame. In 2007, the Arizona Office of Tourism honored him with a “Lifetime Achievement Award” for his many years of service to his native state. In 2008 the governor appointed him to the Arizona Centennial Commission. In 2010 he received the Wild West History Association's Lifetime Achievement Award. He was inducted into the Arizona Music and Entertainment Hall of Fame in 2011. That same year he received the Al Merito Award from the Arizona Historical Society in recognition for lifelong distinguished service in promoting Arizona history. Also in 2011 the Arizona Centennial Commission honored him as one of “Arizona’s Most Inspiring Leaders.” In 2012 he was selected for the U.S. State Department's “Cowboy Hall of Fame Tour,” a goodwill visit to Kyrgyzstan to share American cowboy culture with the people of that country.

== Honors ==
- In 1997, Governor Fife Symington III appointed Trimble the state's official historian.
- Medal of Honor from the Daughters of the American Revolution
- Lifetime Achievement Award from the Arizona Office of Tourism.
- Scottsdale Hall of Fame 2004.
- Arizona Veterans Hall of Fame 2004.
- Wild West History Association Lifetime Achievement Award 2010.
- 2011 Arizona Music and Entertainment Hall of Fame.
- 2011 Arizona Historical Society "Al Merito" Award.

== Books ==
- Arizona: a Panoramic History of a Frontier State, New York: Doubleday, 1977.
- Arizona Adventure, Phoenix: Golden West, 1982, 2003.
- The CO Bar Ranch, Flagstaff: Northland Press, 1982.
- In Old Arizona, Phoenix: Golden West, 1985, 2003.
- Roadside History of Arizona, Missoula, Mont.: Mountain Press, 1986, ISBN 0-87842-198-X.
- Arizona A Cavalcade of History, Tucson: Rio Nuevo Publishers, 1989, 2003.
- Wild West Heroes and Rogues: Wyatt Earp and the Showdown at Tombstone,Phoenix: Primer Publishers, 2008.
- Ash Fork: Images of America, San Francisco: Arcadia Publishers, 2008.
- Arizoniana, Phoenix: Golden West, 1988, 2003.
- Arizona 2000, Flagstaff: Northland Press, 2000.
- Law of the Gun, Phoenix: Arizona Highways, 1997.
- "Arizona Trivia." Golden West Publishers 2004.
- "Arizona: A Diamond in the Rough." Donning 1987.
- "It Always Rains After A Dry Spell." World Pub. 1999
- "Never Give a Heifer a Bum Steer." Arizona Highways 1999.
- "Pulling Legs Attached to Tenderfeet" World Pub. 2000.
- "Ash Fork" Images of America. Arcadia Press 2008
- "Arizona Outlaws and Lawmen." History Press 2015
- "Arizona Oddities: A Land of Anomalies and Tamales." 2018
