= Robert N. Leatherwood =

American politician (1844–1920)

Robert Nelson "Bob" Leatherwood

Member of the Arizona Territorial Legislature Council
- In office 1885

Member of the Arizona Territorial Legislature House of Representatives
- In office 1887

Mayor of Tucson, Arizona
- In office 1880–1881
- Preceded by: James H. Toole
- Succeeded by: J. S. Carr

Sheriff of Pima County, Arizona
- In office 1895–1898
- Preceded by: Joseph B. Scott
- Succeeded by: Lyman Willis Wakefield

Personal details
- Born: June 1, 1844 Haysville, North Carolina
- Died: April 3, 1920 (aged 75) Tucson, Arizona
- Resting place: Peachtree Memorial Baptist Church Cemetery; Murphy, North Carolina
- Party: Democratic

Military service
- Allegiance: Confederate States of America
- Branch/service: Confederate States Army

Robert Nelson "Bob" Leatherwood (June 1, 1844 – April 3, 1920) was an American businessman and politician who served three terms in the Arizona Territorial Legislature and two years as Mayor of Tucson, Arizona Territory.

== Biography ==
Leatherwood was born to William and Elizabeth (Nelson) Leatherwood near Haysville, North Carolina in June 1844. During the American Civil War, he served as a member of the Confederate States Army. Leatherwood saved his uniform and cap following the war and often wore them on special occasions. While he was small of stature, standing 5 feet 5 inches (1.65 m) and weighing 130 pounds (59 kg), he was considered an individual full of "valor and grit". Leatherwood married and the union produced one son.

In 1869, Leatherwood moved to Tucson, Arizona Territory and lived there for the rest of his life. He operated a livery stable and had mining operations in the Santa Catalina Mountains. In addition to his mining interests, Leatherwood built a ranch in the Santa Catalinas.

Politically, Leatherwood was a member of the Tucson City Council from 1874 through 1879. He also served as a school trustee and was elected Mayor of Tucson for 1880. During his term of office, the Southern Pacific Railroad reached Tucson. To celebrate the March 20, 1880 arrival, Leatherwood appointed eight committees to help organize the festivities and served as chairman of both the Committee on Toasts and Speeches and the Committee of Reception. In 1885, Leatherwood represented Pima County in the Council (upper house) during the 13th Arizona Territorial Legislature. He was returned to the territorial legislature two years later, serving in the lower house during the 14th Arizona Territorial Legislature. Leatherwood's final term in the legislature was during the 1893 session.

By the late 1880s, Leatherwood was a deputy sheriff serving under Charles A. Shibell. He was elected Pima County Sheriff on November 6, 1894 and served in the office from 1895 through 1898. After leaving office he retired to private life.

Leatherwood died from a heart attack on April 3, 1920. He was buried in Moss Memorial Graveyard, Cherokee County, North Carolina. Despite rumors to the contrary, Leatherwood was not buried in his Civil War uniform.
