= 14th Arizona Territorial Legislature =

Session of the Arizona Territorial Legislature (1887)

←	13th	15th	→

Overview
- Legislative body: Arizona Territorial Legislature
- Jurisdiction: Arizona Territory, United States
- Term: January 10, 1887 – March 10, 1887

Council
- Members: 12
- President: A. Cornwell

House of Representatives
- Members: 24
- Speaker: Samuel F. Webb

The 14th Arizona Territorial Legislative Assembly was a session of the Arizona Territorial Legislature which convened in Prescott, Arizona. The session ran from January 10, 1887, till March 10, 1887.

The frugal nature of the session, compared to its predecessor, combined with an outbreak of mumps and measles resulted in the session being dubbed the "Measly Fourteenth".

== Background ==
Following the excesses of the 13th Arizona Territorial Legislature, the U.S. Congress had passed the "Harrison Act" which placed limits on territorial debt. The act further prevented territorial legislatures from granting divorces or name changes. After the election of President Grover Cleveland, C. Meyer Zulick had replaced Frederick Augustus Tritle as Governor of Arizona Territory. As for events in the Apache Wars, Geronimo had surrendered on September 9, 1886, ending large scale hostilities within the territory.

== Legislative session ==
The session began on January 10, 1887, and ran for 60 days. During the session a number of the legislature's members contracted mumps and measles. Of the 102 bills passed by the session, two were vetoed.

=== Governor's address ===
Governor Zulick sent his address to the legislature in writing on the first day of the session. He began by discussing the end of the Apache Wars, saying "The gratitude of the people of Arizona is due the President of the United States and the Secretary of the Interior for the removal of these Indians, who have for more than a quarter century stood a barrier to the progress of the Territory, a constant and ever present menace to it prosperity." He then went on to thank General Nelson A. Miles and his officers for their role in the capture and relocation of Geronimo. With the hostile Apaches dealt with, the governor believed it was finally possible to fully develop Arizona's wealth.

Zulick went on to discuss the effects of the "Harrison Act". Dealing with territorial taxation, the governor noted various counties performed property assessments in different ways and he believed most assessments were undervalued. He then requested county courts be consolidated into district courts as a cost-saving method.

Water availability was an important issue to the governor and he desired to see construction of water canals, noting "the Territory should never surrender control of its water supply; it is the people's heritage and should be controlled in their interest." As for education he reported that a site had been secured on which to build the territorial university. A further 12 new school districts had been created since the last session, bringing the territorial total to 130. In other matters, Zulick asked for a revision to be performed to the territorial legal code. He also wanted the repeal of a law passed during previous session that disenfranchised Mormons.

=== Legislation ===
Compared to the previous session's outlay of US$294,323, the fourteenth legislature only authorized a meager US$44,217. The first cut expense came with the elimination of the territorial position of Commissioner of Immigration. The session was not all cost cutting as it authorized US$1,200/year in supplemental pay for justices of the Arizona Territorial Supreme Court. This was in addition to their regular pay received from the Federal government.

In other actions, the session created a territorial lottery. A proposal to create "Frisco" county, with its seat in Flagstaff was defeated. The proposal would be revived in a later session with the creation of Coconino County.

The best remembered action of the session was creation of a Live Stock Sanitary Board. This was accompanied by a set of laws requiring cattle ranchers to register their brands with their county recorder along with others intended to protect against the spread of infectious diseases.

== Aftermath ==
Based upon the authority granted by the new livestock laws, Governor Zulick imposed a 90-day quarantine upon imported Mexican cattle, similar to the existing quarantine on imported European cattle. This caused a potential diplomatic incident as the Mexican government protested the new requirement and suggested that they might impose a similar quarantine. A diplomatic incident was avoided when it was determined the Arizona quarantine violated the U.S. Congress' constitutional authority to regulate international trade. While the quarantine was overruled, it did establish the principle of protecting against infectious disease and prompt the Congress into action on the subject.

== Members ==
House of Representatives
Name	County	Name	County
J. Q. Adamson	Apache	Robert N. Leatherwood	Pima
Henry T. Andrews	Yavapai	A. McKay	Pima
W. H. Ashurst	Yavapai	D. H. Ming	Graham
Charles Baker	Yuma	A. G. Oliver	Yavapai
A. A. Bean	Pima	B. L. Peel	Cochise
J. M. Bracewell	Cochise	J. B. Scott	Pima
P. F. Collins	Mohave	James Scott	Apache
Andrew J. Doran	Pinal	John Y. T. Smith	Maricopa
O. C. Felton	Yavapai	Eugene J. Trippel	Gila
J. J. Fisher	Yavapai	Samuel F. Webb (Speaker)	Maricopa
M. Gray	Cochise	Scott White	Cochise
F. W. Heyne	Cochise	C. R. Wores	Pima

Council
Name	County
J. W. Anderson	Pinal
L. W. Blinn	Cochise
J. H. Breed	Apache
E. L. Burdick	Mohave
A. Cornwell (President)	Northern District
Charles R. Drake	Pima
C. B. Foster	Yavapai
L. H. Goodrich	Maricopa
Isaac Lyons	Yuma
Peter C. Robertson	Gila
George H. Stevens	Graham
W. C. Watkins	Southern District

- The Northern District was composed of Apache, Maricopa, Mohave, Yuma, and Yavapai counties, while the Southern District encompassed Cochise, Gila, Graham, Pima, and Pinal counties.
