= John Y. T. Smith =

American businessman and politician (1831–1903)

John Y. T. Smith (born John Smith; September 16, 1831 – July 15, 1903) was an American businessman and politician who became the first non-Indian to live in what would become Phoenix, Arizona. He served three times as a member of the Arizona Territorial Legislature, becoming Speaker of the House during his final term, and was appointed to a two-year term as Territorial treasurer.

== Background ==
Smith was born September 16, 1831, near Buffalo, New York. At the age of 10, he became a cabin boy on a riverboat. He worked on the Mississippi, Missouri, and Ohio rivers for three years before going to work on a farm near Carlinville, Illinois. In 1853 he left the farm and joined a group driving 500 head of cattle to California. In California, Smith worked as a miner and prospector. He left for British Columbia in 1858 as part of the Fraser Canyon Gold Rush, returning to California the next year.

At the beginning of the American Civil War, Smith enlisted in Company H of the 4th California Infantry. His unit was initially stationed at Yuma, Arizona. In 1864 his unit was transferred first to San Luis Obispo, California, and then Dunn Barracks near San Pedro, California. Smith advanced through the ranks during his time in the military, achieving the rank of first lieutenant.

Following his discharge in December 1865, Smith became assistant wagonmaster on a supply train heading toward Fort McDowell, Arizona Territory. There he is credited with becoming the first non-Indian to live at what would become Phoenix. From February till June 1866, Smith oversaw a civilian workforce harvesting hay along the bank of the Salt River. By early 1867 he had built a hay camp and laid out a road between the camp and the fort. At the camp he built a house and had a small herd of cattle. Smith filed no claim to the land however and had abandoned the camp by late 1867. After leaving the camp, Smith became a post trader at Fort McDowell.

Smith opened a store in Phoenix in 1872. A couple years later he formed a business partnership with King Woolsey to produce flour. Toward this end, Smith built Phoenix's second flour mill in 1876. He operated the mill till 1887 when it was replaced with a new mill. Smith operated his second mill till 1899 when he sold it. To differentiate him from several other men with the same name living within the territory, Smith was granted his initials by the 10th Arizona Territorial Legislature on January 29, 1879. The initials stand for "Yours Truly".

Smith married Ellen E. Shaver, Phoenix's first schoolteacher, in 1873. The couple had two daughters and a son.

Unusual for the place and time, Smith was a steadfast Republican. This did not prevent his participation in politics however. Smith was elected to the 5th Arizona Territorial Legislature in 1868. In 1873, he ran for Territorial delegate and placing third in a five-way race. He returned to the territorial legislature twice more, serving in the 14th and 15th sessions. During his final term he was Speaker of the House and influential in efforts to move the territorial capital from Prescott to Phoenix. Smith was appointed to a two-year term as Territorial treasurer in 1899. At the end of this term he was appointed to a two-year term on the Territorial Board of Equalization.

Socially active, Smith was a freemason who served as Grand Master of the Grand lodge of Arizona. In military orders he served as commander of J. W. Owens post No. 5, Grand Army of the Republic and was affiliated with the California chapter of the Loyal Legion.

Smith died on July 15, 1903, during a trip to Los Angeles, California, where he was seeking medical treatment. He was initially buried in Phoenix with both Masonic and Grand Army of the Republic right. His remains were moved to Phoenix's Greenwood Memorial Park in 1914.
