= C. Meyer Zulick =

7th Governor of Arizona Territory

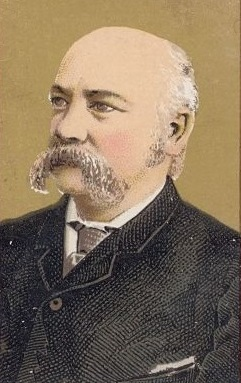

7th Governor of Arizona Territory
- In office November 2, 1885 – April 8, 1889
- Nominated by: Grover Cleveland
- Preceded by: Frederick Augustus Tritle
- Succeeded by: Lewis Wolfley

Personal details
- Born: June 3, 1839 Easton, Pennsylvania, U.S.
- Died: March 2, 1926 (aged 86) Asbury Park, New Jersey, U.S.
- Resting place: Easton Cemetery
- Party: Democratic
- Spouse: Caroline L. Nightingale
- Profession: Attorney

Conrad Meyer Zulick (June 3, 1839 – March 1, 1926) was an American jurist and Democratic party activist who became the seventh Governor of Arizona Territory. During his term the Indian Wars ended and the territorial capital was moved from Prescott to Phoenix. He is also known for having been a prisoner in Mexico at the time of his appointment.

== Early life and education ==
Zulick was born June 3, 1839, in Easton, Pennsylvania, to Anthony and Jane Morton (Cummings) Zulick. His father was an immigrant from Frankfurt, Germany, while his mother was a Pennsylvania native. Zulick's family lived at a private school called Minerva Hall where, supplemented by private tutors, he received his early education. He was trained as an attorney and in June 1860 was admitted to the New Jersey bar. Zulick also campaigned for Stephen A. Douglas in the 1860 presidential election.

== Career ==
=== American Civil War ===
When the American Civil War began, Zulick became adjutant for the Second Division of Colored Volunteers. He rose to unit commander before being discharged as a colonel for a service-incurred disability. Following discharge, he moved to Newark, New Jersey and became the first Surrogate of Essex County from the Democratic Party. Zulick married Caroline L. Nightingale and the couple had one daughter, Lillian Carlotta. Zulick's grandson was Naval aviator DeWitt C. Ramsey.

President Andrew Johnson appointed Zulick Collector of Internal Revenue for Essex County, New Jersey in 1879, and he was elected Surrogate Judge of Essex County. Zulick was a delegate to the 1880 Democratic National Convention and campaigned for his party. He turned down offers for political nominations to be governor or a member of Congress as he had developed business interests in Arizona and planned to move to the territory. By late 1884, he moved to Tombstone, Arizona Territory.

== Governorship ==
Zulick's appointment as Territorial Governor was due mainly to lobbying by Senator John R. McPherson of New Jersey. President Grover Cleveland nominated him as a recess appointment on October 14, 1885, with the U.S. Senate confirming the appointment on December 10, 1885. The appointment was renewed for a full four-year term on May 5, 1886. At time of his appointment, Zulick was imprisoned at Nacozari, Sonora. He had gone to the town in his role as President of the New Jersey and Sonora Copper Mines to resolve a financial dispute. After arriving he found out that under Mexican law he could be arrested and held until the company's debts were paid. A rescue mission was organized and former army scout M. T. "Doc" Donovan freed the prisoner during a 2 am foray. Zulick was not informed of his appointment as governor until he had crossed the border back into the United States.

Following his rescue, Zulick enjoyed a series of receptions in Tombstone, Tucson, and Phoenix as he journeyed to the capital. The predominantly Democratic population and newspapers in turn celebrated the appointment of the first territorial governor from their party. Zulick was sworn in on November 2, 1885. The issues facing the new governor included smuggling along the Mexican border, patronage problems, and the recent escape by Geronimo and a group of Chiricahua Apache from the San Carlos Reservation. To address the smuggling issue, Zulick proposed four mounted inspectors be hired to patrol the border, ensuring that duties on alcohol and tobacco were collected and to prevent problems with livestock migrating over the border. The patronage issues were due to Republican appointees from the previous administration refusing to leave their positions until a court decree forced them to vacate.

The Apache uprising caused more political problems for Zulick than the border smuggling. Concern over the "hostile" Indians caused most Arizonans to call for action against the Apache. Then, while the U.S. Army escalated military operations against the insurgency, the governor issued a December 23, 1885, proclamation telling the territory's citizens "not to take the law into your hands to punish the Apaches." This decree was viewed unfavorably by the population with one newspaper editorializing, "He proclaimed that the citizens of Arizona were lawless ruffians, and in their wrath there was danger that they would hurt a few poor Indians." Soon afterward Zulick's popularity plummeted and he was being referred to as a "trickster of the smallest caliber" and a "failure". Despite his low approval among the populace, the governor maintained the confidence of President Cleveland and was thus safely remained in office.

The territory faced financial problems during Zulick's administration. The 13th Arizona Territorial Legislature had left Arizona with a territorial debt of US$1,101,625. Motivated in part by the excesses of this legislative session, the U.S. Congress on July 30, 1886, passed a statute limiting territorial debt. Under these restrictions, the 14th Arizona Territorial Legislature appropriated only US$44,217, down from the US$294,323 appropriated by the previous session. In addition to appropriations, the session granted the governor's request and passed a "Stock and Sanitary Law" requiring the registration of cattle brands and the quarantine of livestock imported into the territory to check for infectious disease. The session also saw Zulick declare the curse of hostile Indians had come to an end following the capture of Geronimo's band. Despite these events, the action Zulick was most associated with in the session was the repeal of a "test oath law" designed to limit voting rights of Mormon immigrants to the territory. After arguing that "A man may be an advocate of bigamy or polygamy, or belong to the church that so believes, but until he puts forth his belief in practice he has offended no law", Zulick was accused of making a political deal with the Church of Jesus Christ of Latter-day Saints (LDS Church) to control the territory.

The election of President Benjamin Harrison signaled the end of Zulick's time as governor. A new governor however was not appointed until after the start of the 15th Arizona Territorial Legislature. The first piece of legislation passed during this session moved the territorial capital from Prescott to Phoenix. Zulick's support for statehood was shown in Public Act Number 59, which called for convening a constitutional convention. While this act was passed, the convention was never called as the governor's successor, Lewis Wolfley, felt it was an "unwise measure". The final act of the Zulick administration was appointment for a full slate of territorial officials. Despite the slate being rejected by the legislature in favor of a competing slate nominated by Governor Wolfley, many of those nominated by Zulick refused to leave their appointed posts. This dual set of territorial officials would lead to political trouble for the incoming governor.

=== Post-governor career ===
After leaving office as governor, Zulick moved to a farm near Phoenix, Arizona, where he raised figs, grapes, and oranges. He also purchased roughly 150 mares and raised horses. In November 1890, he was elected to the 16th Arizona Territorial Legislature. With Grover Cleveland's return to the presidency in 1893, Zulick was suggested as a possible territorial governor. This suggestion was repeated in 1895 as part of the efforts to remove L. C. Hughes from office.

Upon retirement, Zulick returned to New Jersey. He died in Asbury Park, New Jersey, on March 2, 1926, and was interred in Easton Cemetery in Easton.

Political offices
Preceded by Frederick Augustus Tritle	Governor of Arizona Territory; 1885–1889	Succeeded by Lewis Wolfley
