= 15th Arizona Territorial Legislature =

Session of the Arizona Territorial Legislature (1889)

←	14th	16th	→

Overview
- Legislative body: Arizona Territorial Legislature
- Jurisdiction: Arizona Territory, United States

Council
- Members: 12
- President: Charles R. Drake

House of Representatives
- Members: 24
- Speaker: John Y. T. Smith

The 15th Arizona Territorial Legislative Assembly was a session of the Arizona Territorial Legislature which began on January 21, 1889, in Prescott, Arizona, moved to Phoenix on February 7 and did not adjourn till April 11. The session is known as the "Hold-over Legislature" due to the Republican majority extending the length of the session past the sixty-day limit prescribed by law.

== Background ==
During his term of office, Governor C. Meyer Zulick had experienced steadily declining popularity among the territory's population. He remained secure in his position, however, because he had the President's confidence. This situation changed however when Benjamin Harrison defeated Grover Cleveland during the presidential election of 1888. As the session began it was expected that the incoming President would replace the governor with a member of his own party.

Within the territory, speculation was rife over a possible move of the territorial capital. Phoenix, which was completing construction of a new city hall large enough to hold the territorial legislature, was viewed as the primary challenger to Prescott's hold on the seat of government.

== Legislative session ==
Governor Zulick delivered his speech to the legislature in writing on the session's first day. In the address he called for Arizona to be granted statehood, calling territorial status the reason for the American Revolution. Control of federal school lands needed to fund education within the territory were a secondary benefit of statehood. The need for reapportionment of the legislature and John Wesley Powell's survey of the Grand Canyon were also covered.

=== Relocation of capitol ===
The first issue dealt with by the session was a proposal for the relocation of the territorial capitol. A bill to relocate the territorial capital was passed in the House by a vote of 14 to 10 and by the Council on a 9 to 2 vote. Legislative Act No. 1, signed by Governor Zulick on January 26, moved the capitol to Phoenix on February 4, 1889.

Following passage of the bill to relocate the capitol to Phoenix, the session suspended and on January 29, 1889, began the move to the new seat of government. Instead of using stagecoaches to make the trip via the direct route, the delegates instead chose to utilize a pair of Pullman cars routed through Los Angeles; the luxurious mode of transport was chosen in large part due to the railroad's practice of providing free passes to the legislators in an effort to avoid laws unfavorable to their interests.

Territorial Secretary James A. Bayard was in turn left with the job of packing and transporting the session's furniture, records, and supplies. By the time the furniture arrived at the new capitol it had been damaged to the point of uselessness on the rough roads between Prescott and Phoenix. The session was saved by donations from the new capitol's citizens. After the journey, the legislature reconvened on February 7, 1889.

=== Other legislation ===
Once the legislature got back to business they passed a number of measures. One that attracted significant notice was a law, based upon a similar New Mexico statute, that established the death penalty for train robbery. Other laws prohibited carrying of deadly weapons inside town limits and requiring literacy in English for territorial office holders.

Other actions taken by the session were transferring the northern section of the Tonto Basin from Yavapai to Gila county and establishing a $3000 subsidy encouraging development of artesian wells.

=== Session extension ===
As the session drew towards its conclusion, the issue of official appointments came to the forefront. President Harrison was set to be inaugurated on March 4, 1889, and by federal law the assembly was limited to a length of 60 days. The Republican majority was eager to have a governor from their own party appointed so that he could appoint his own slate of nominations of territorial officials. As former Governor Tritle noted, "The Governor has no power of removal, and when appointments have been made by the Governor, whether they shall have been confirmed or not, the incumbents will hold until the next Legislative Assembly convenes, and will also hold over thereafter until successors shall have been nominated by the Governor and confirmed by the Council." It was feared that unless the new Governor arrived swiftly there would be no choice but to accept the nominations that had been made by outgoing Governor Zulick for the next two years. If was further feared that unless a Republican majority was elected to the next legislature, future legislatures could refuse to confirm any nominations from any new governor and thus keep Zulck's nominees in office till after President Harrison left office.

On March 14, 1889, Lewis Wolfley was nominated as Governor of Arizona Territory, receiving Senate confirmation on March 28. On March 22, the sixtieth day of the session, the Council rejected all of Governor Zulick's nominees and instead of adjourning remained in session. Governor Wolfley arrived in the territory on April 8 with his own list of nominees which the Council quickly approved, ending the session on April 11, 1889.

== Aftermath ==
An after effect of the session extending past the 60-day limit was that Arizona Territory gained two sets of territorial officials. The Democratic nominees presented by Governor Zulick refused to relinquish control of buildings and institutions needed for performance of official duties, claiming confirmation of the new Republican appointees had not been legal due to the session running too long. The issue of sorting out the two separate sets of officials went to court, with the Republicans generally prevailing. In July 1890, the last Zulick appointee resigned.

A second issue was a set of eleven "lost laws" that had been passed by the session but misplaced in a desk drawer without the Governor's signature or veto. The papers containing these laws were found by Acting Governor Oakes Murphy before the next legislative session and forwarded to that session for reconfirmation.

A popular story that has arisen about the session is the tale of a prostitute named "Kissin' Jenny". In the most common variation of the story, supporters of the effort to move the capital made arraignments with Jenny to ensure passage of the session's first act. According to the story, one of delegates opposing the move was one of Jenny's customers who also owned a glass eye. The delegate, at the end of the evening during a visit to her boudoir, placed his glass eye into a glass of water and went to sleep. During the night Jenny then drank the contents of the glass. In the morning, the delegate discovered his glass eye was missing was too embarrassed to be seen in public. The tale claims the delegate's failure to appear in the legislature resulted in the bill passing by one vote. An alternate version of the story has the delegate being a supporter of the bill and other supporters finding a replacement prosthetic in time for the embarrassed delegate to appear and cast the deciding vote.

== Members ==
House of Representatives
Name	County	Name	County
C. Douglas Brown	Yavapai	J. S. O'Brien	Pima
J. J. Chatham	Pima	Samuel Purdy	Yuma
George H. Dailey	Cochise	John V. Rhoades	Yavapai
Louis DePuy	Pinal	John S. Robbins	Cochise
J. L. Fisher	Yavapai	F. L. Rogers	Yavapai
Charles L. Flinn	Apache	John Y. T. Smith (Speaker)	Maricopa
Thomas Halleck	Mohave	James O. Stanford	Cochise
Grant Hicks	Cochise	George H. Stevens	Graham
J. Allen Johnson	Apache	H. B. Tenney	Pima
John C. Jones	Gila	George P. Thornton	Yavapai
T. C. Jordan	Maricopa	Henry D. Underwood	Pima
Louis Martin	Pima	Alexander Wright	Cochise

Council
Name	County
George W. Cheyney	Cochise
John W. Dorrington	Yuma
Charles R. Drake (President)	Pima
Burt Dunlap	Graham
W. H. Hardy	Mohave
George W. Hoadley	Southern District
J. M. W. Moore	Yavapai
L. H. Orme	Northern District
George T. Peter	Gila
E. J. Simpson	Apache
Richard E. Sloan	Pinal
Samuel F. Webb	Maricopa

- The Northern District was composed of Apache, Maricopa, Mohave, Yuma, and Yavapai counties, while the Southern District encompassed Cochise, Gila, Graham, Pima, and Pinal counties.
