= The Palace Restaurant and Saloon =

Historic business in Prescott, Arizona

Coordinates: 34.5413°N 112.4704°W

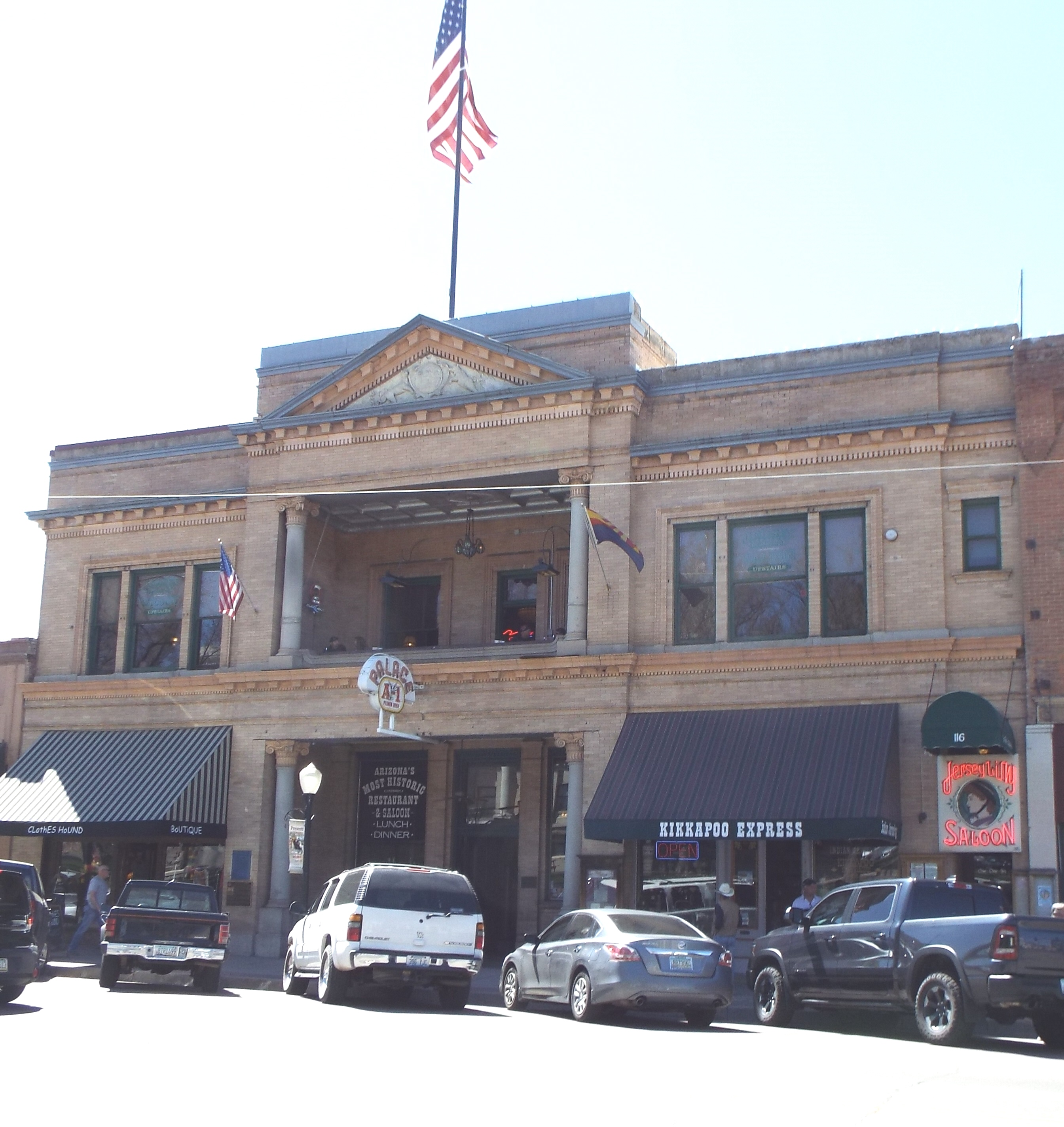
- The Palace Restaurant and Saloon
- Interactive map of The Palace Restaurant and Saloon

Restaurant information
- Established: 1877
- Owners: Dennis McCormick, Derry McCormick, Scott Stanford, and Martha Mekeel.
- Food type: Steakhouse, seafood
- Dress code: Casual
- Location: 120 S. Montezuma Street, Prescott, Arizona, 86303, United States
- Reservations: Yes
- Website: Official website

The Palace Restaurant and Saloon is the oldest business and oldest bar operating in the state of Arizona, located on historic Whiskey Row in Prescott. The saloon was opened in 1877 and rebuilt in 1901 after a disastrous fire swept the district in 1900. It is considered one of the most historic bars in the state.

== History ==
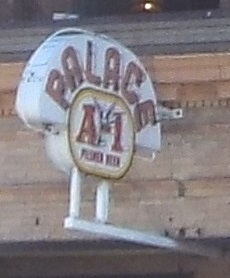
Outdoor sign

D.C. Thorne purchased the lot on which the saloon stands in 1867, three years after the founding of the city. He built the saloon in 1877 and named it The Palace Saloon, one of more than 40 bars which stood next to one another on Whiskey Row in Prescott. Over the course of its history, it has seen such famous patrons as Wyatt Earp, Virgil Earp, Doc Holliday (in the 1870s before they headed south to Tombstone), and Steve McQueen. Wyatt Earp was involved in several gunfights behind the saloon, killing two men. Holliday also killed a man in the saloon during a knife fight.

Thorne owned the property until it was destroyed in a fire in 1883, after which it was sold to Robert Brow, who rebuilt it with innovations intended to make the structure less prone to fire, including a stone foundation and an iron roof. It re-opened in 1884 with the hand-carved Brunswick bar, several chandeliers, three gaming tables, and two club rooms. The Palace was considered the finest saloon in Arizona.

The saloon was the scene of other violence, including the beating death of a prostitute named Jennie Clark by her boyfriend Fred Glover. Jennie's real name was Nellie Coyle, and she and Glover got into a fight at the saloon one night in August 1884. During the course of the scuffle, she was knocked down several times, and may have been kicked while on the floor. She died of her injuries that night. Glover was tried and convicted of first degree murder and sentenced to hang. Governor Frederick Tritle commuted the sentence to life in prison, which was further reduced in 1889 by Governor Oakes Murphy. Glover was released from prison the following year.

A fire swept through Whiskey Row in 1900; the bar patrons picked up the fancy hand-carved Brunswick bar and carried it out of the burning building, setting it down across the street. They then continued their drinking as the other side of the street burned. The saloon was rebuilt at a cost of $50,000, combining it with the Cabinet Saloon next-door, and it re-opened in 1901 under the name The Palace Hotel. It was called "the most beautiful saloon in all of Arizona". It was now a two-story masonry building consisting of grey granite, iron, and pressed ornamental bricks, and measuring 75 feet wide and 125 feet front to back. The central pediment on the front façade contained the seal of the Arizona Territory, flanked by a mountain lion and a bear. The saloon contained gaming tables for faro, poker, roulette, kino, and craps, as well as the celebrated bar.

The saloon closed down during the Prohibition era, but a speakeasy continued to operate in the basement. Throughout its history, it has served as more than just a bar and restaurant, being used as a place to post work notices, the local mineral office where mineral claims were bought and sold, and as a polling location during elections. It also had a seedier side: its upstairs rooms were used as a brothel, while its basement was used as an opium den, underground jail, and gambling rooms. Doc Holliday's common-law wife Mary Katherine Horony-Cummings, better known as Big Nose Kate, had worked upstairs as a prostitute.

In 1996, the saloon underwent a retrograde renovation, restoring the interior to better reflect the time in which it was created, including swinging doors, hardwood floors, oak wainscoting, and leaded-glass windows. In 2011, Prescott implemented a "Boot Drop" on New Year's Eve, in imitation of the "Ball Drop" in New York City's Times Square. Each year, the boot is dropped on the roof of The Palace.

== Current setting ==
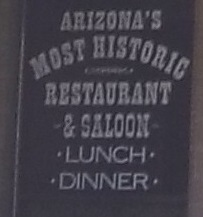
Window sign

It is located in the historic district of Prescott, across the street from the county courthouse. Having been established in 1877, the establishment is not only the oldest bar in the state of Arizona, but the oldest business as well. It has been named "America's 10 best historic saloons" by USA Today, the second smallest city in the United States to be able to claim such a distinction. The centerpiece of the saloon is the Brunswick bar which was saved from destruction in the fire of 1900. Built in New Jersey, the bar was freighted around the tip of South America to San Francisco, from where it was transported by pack mule to Prescott, then the territorial capital of Arizona. The bar is 24 feet long, hand-carved from solid oak, and also contains large columns. The bar-top is polished cherry, while its fixtures consist of "the finest French plate glass oval top mirrors." In addition to the swinging doors, hardwood floors, oak wainscoting and leaded-glass windows, the walls are lined with historic photographs and taxidermy. The bar taps are in unusual shapes such as a pistol and a cowboy, there is a high, pressed-tin ceiling, and the booths are named after famous patrons such as the Earp brothers and Doc Holliday. The wait staff and bartenders dress in period costumes from the 1880s. According to historians and anthropologists, the 1996 restoration returned the saloon to "an accurate replica of the original bar as it was constructed in 1877." The bar continues to sell Old Overholt, which was the preferred drink of Holliday when he frequented the saloon. In the back of the saloon is a hand-painted mural featuring scenes and actors from Junior Bonner.

== In popular culture ==
The bar has been featured in several films, including Junior Bonner, starring Steve McQueen; Billy Jack, starring Tom Laughlin; and Wanda Nevada, starring Peter Fonda and Brooke Shields. The establishment is said to be haunted by several of its past denizens, and has been featured on Ghost Adventures.

== Images ==
The Palace Hotel

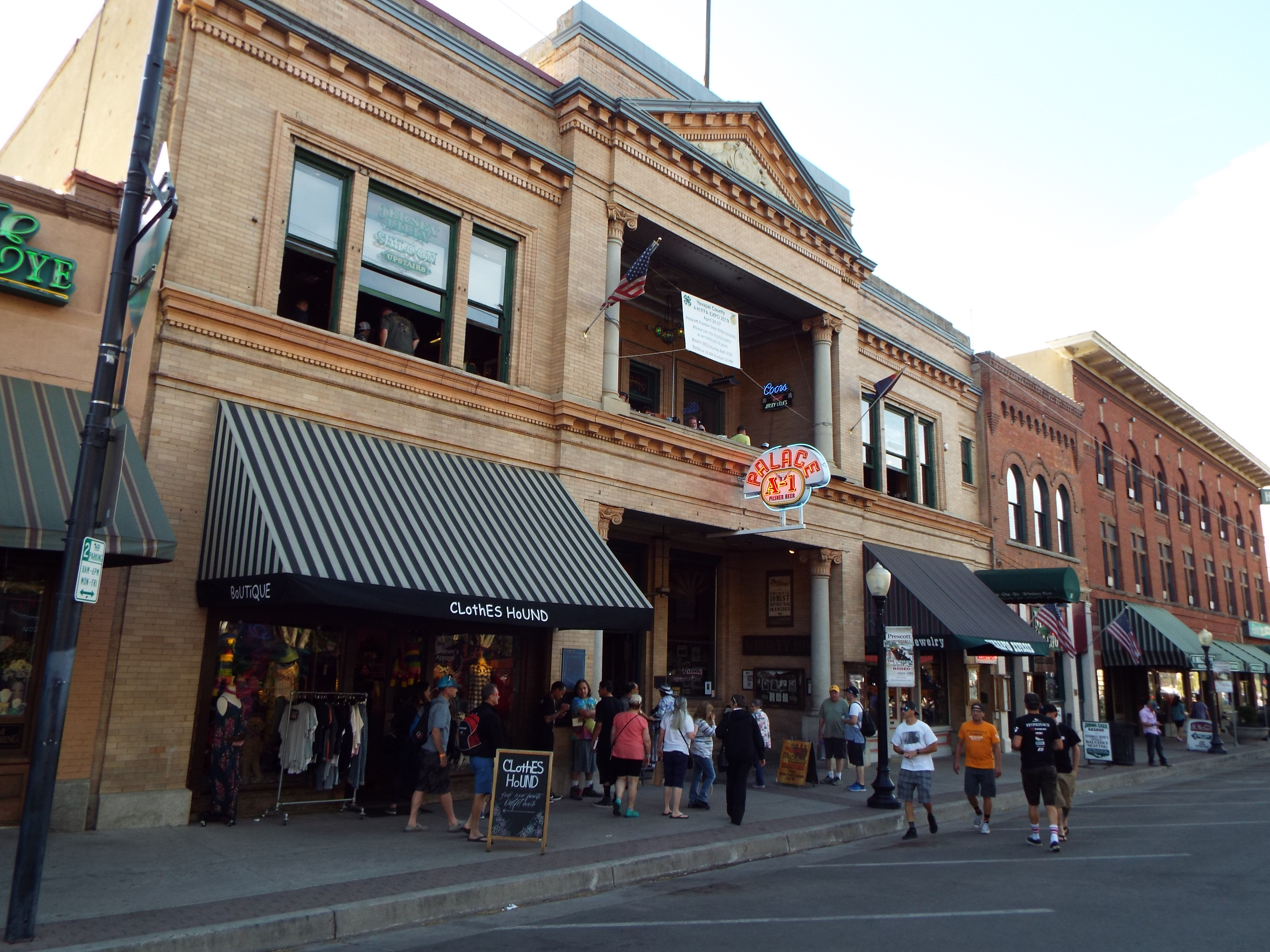
Palace Hotel

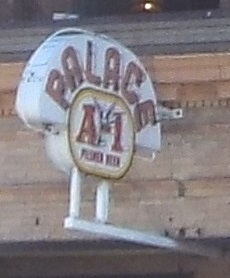
Palace Hotel outdoor sign

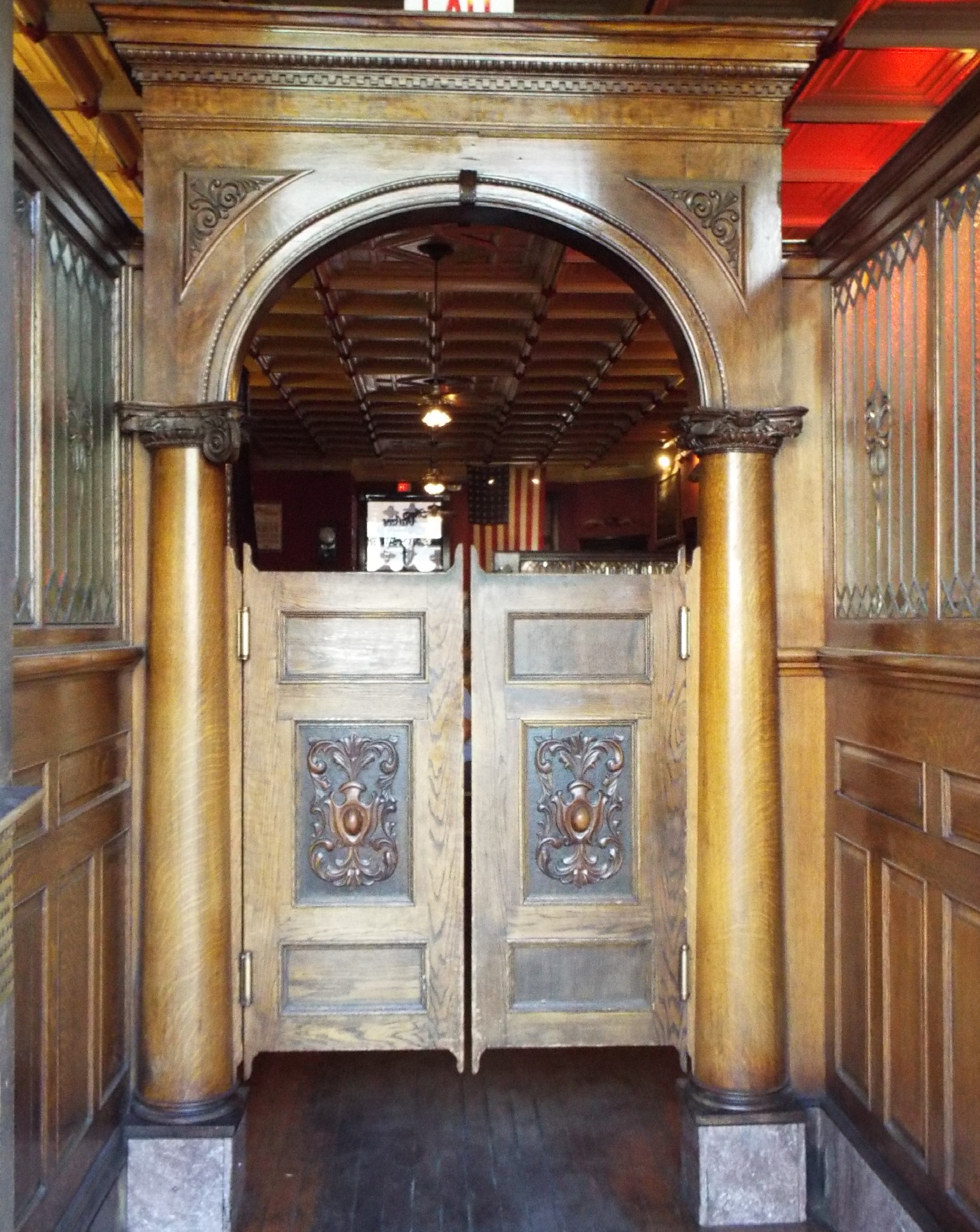
Original 1901 Saloon Swinging Doors

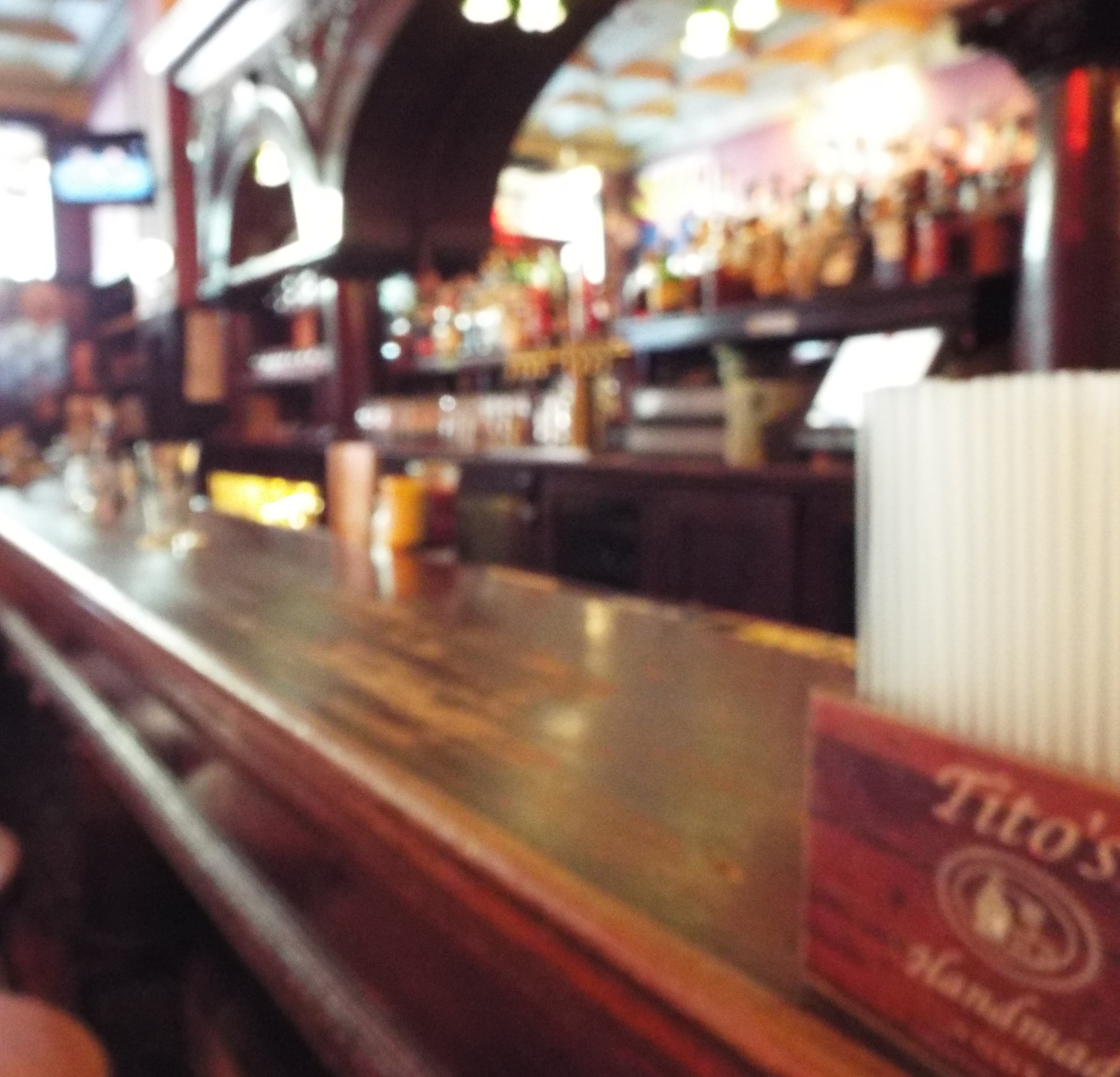
Original 1884 Brunswick bar

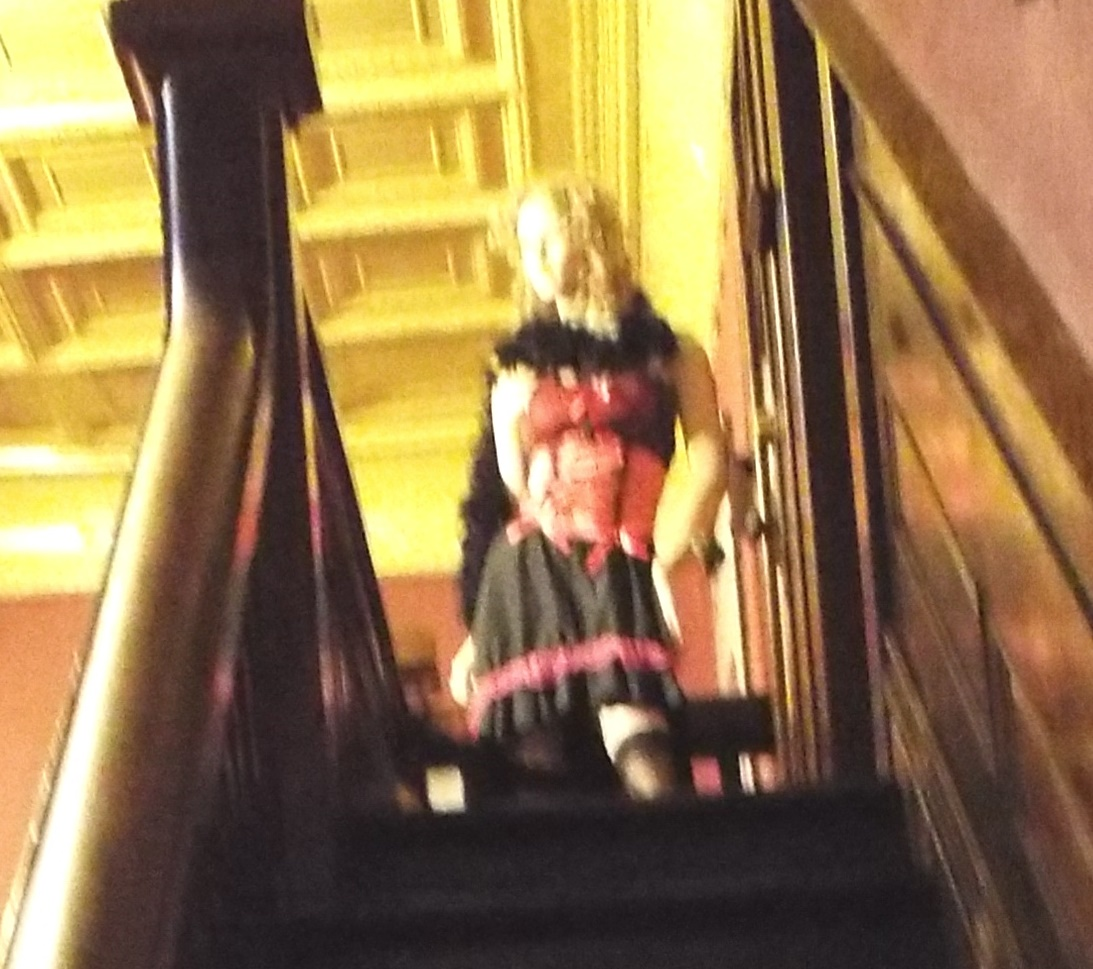
What once was the second floor Brothel room

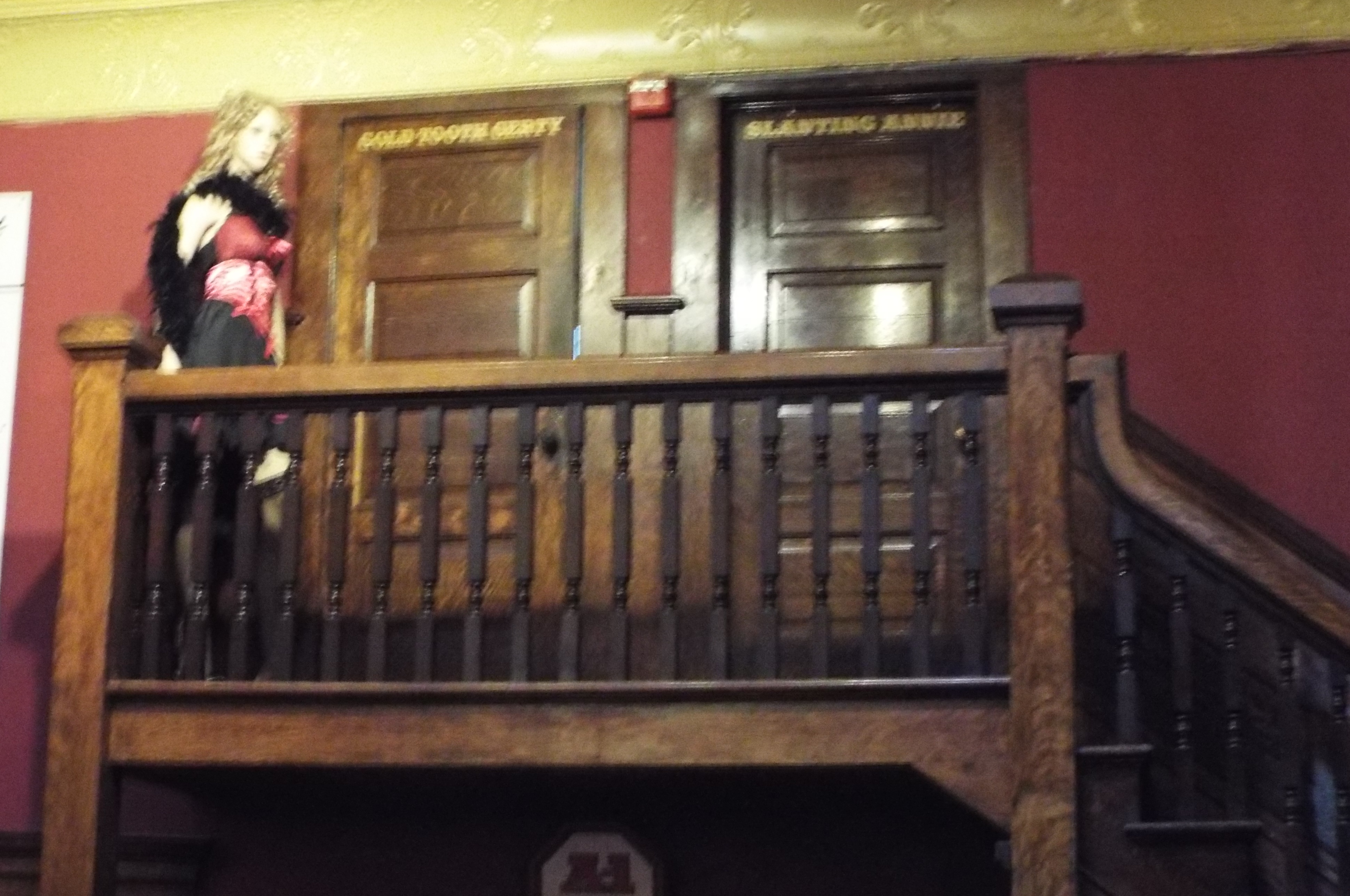
Different view of the second floor Brothel room

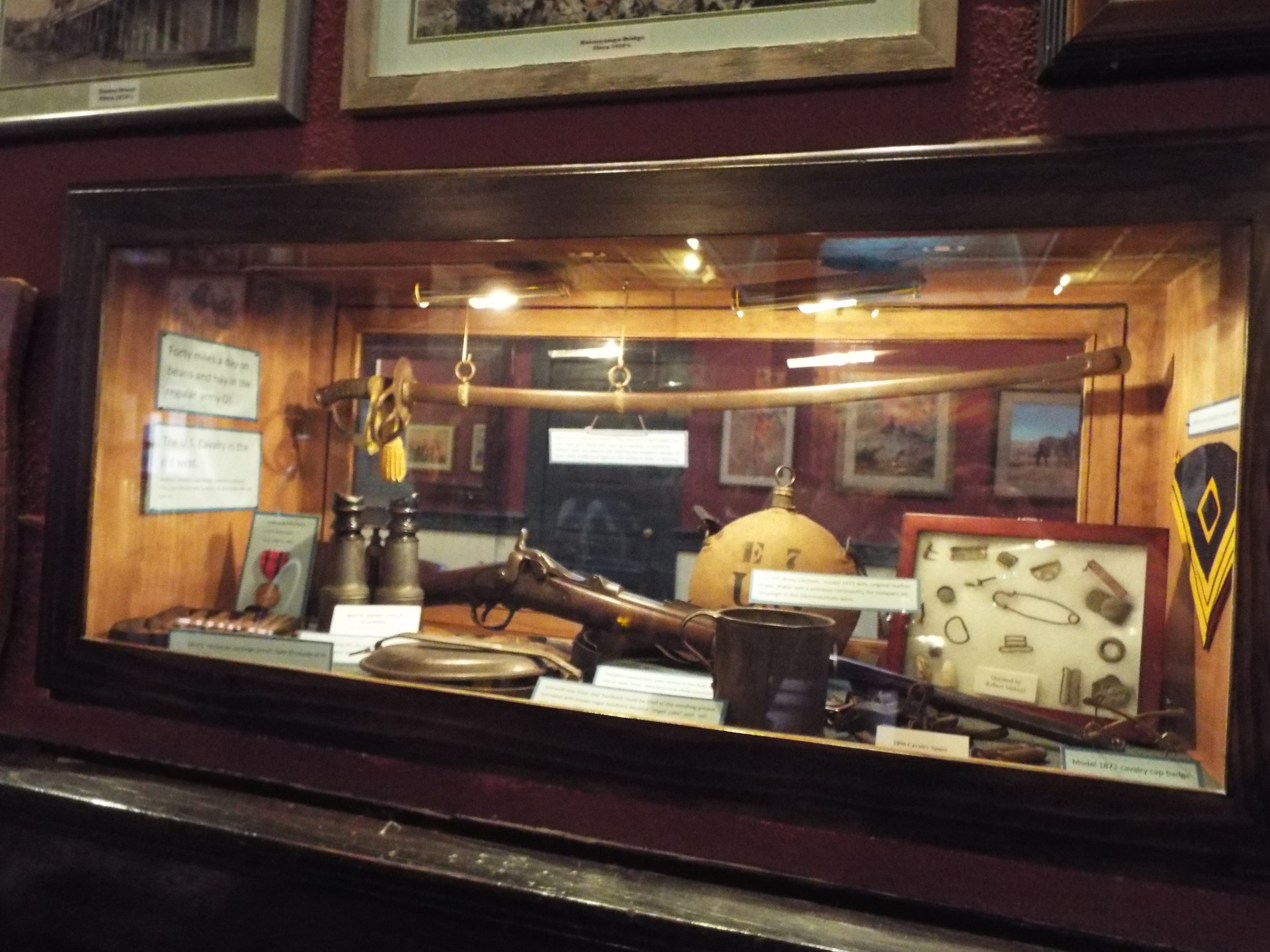
Fort Whipple display

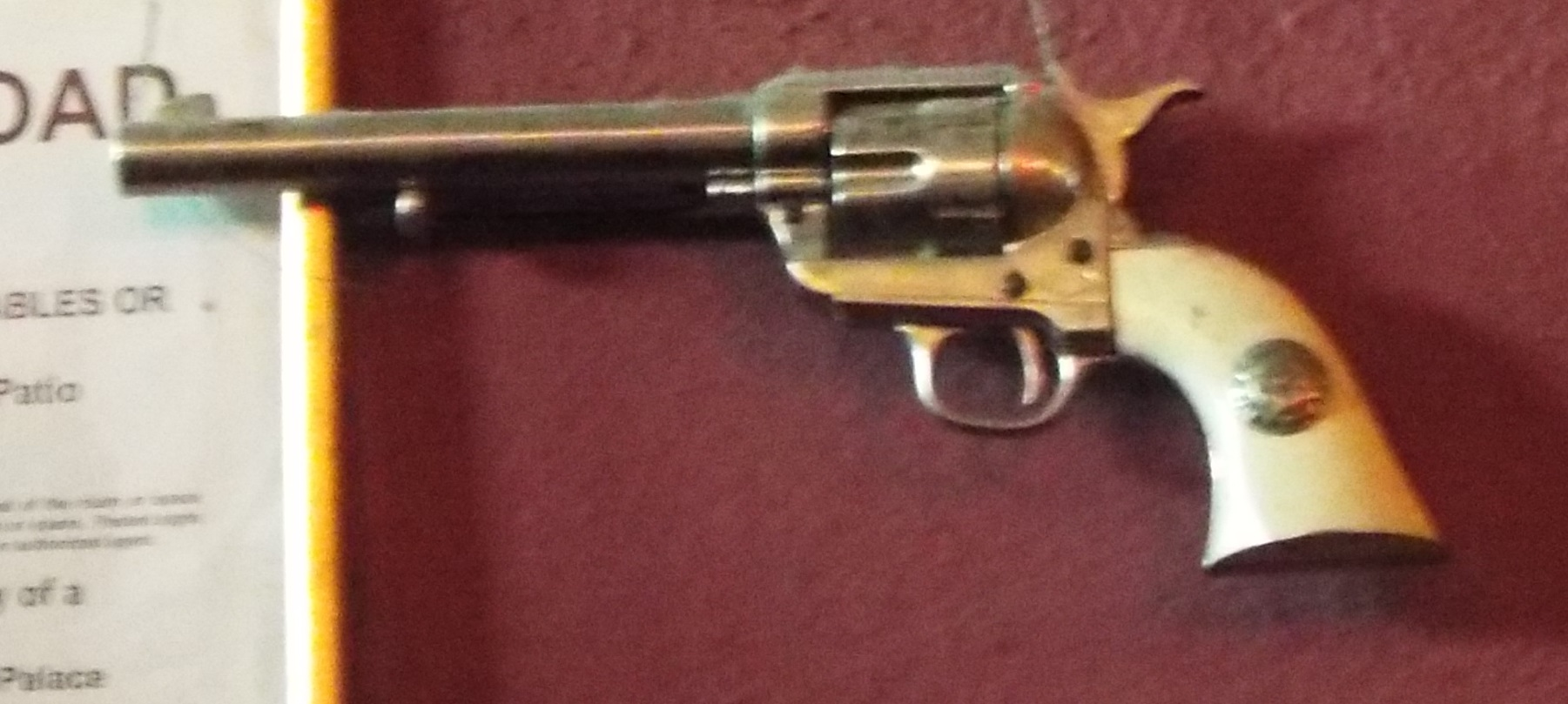
Replica of Wyatt Earp's Colt 45.

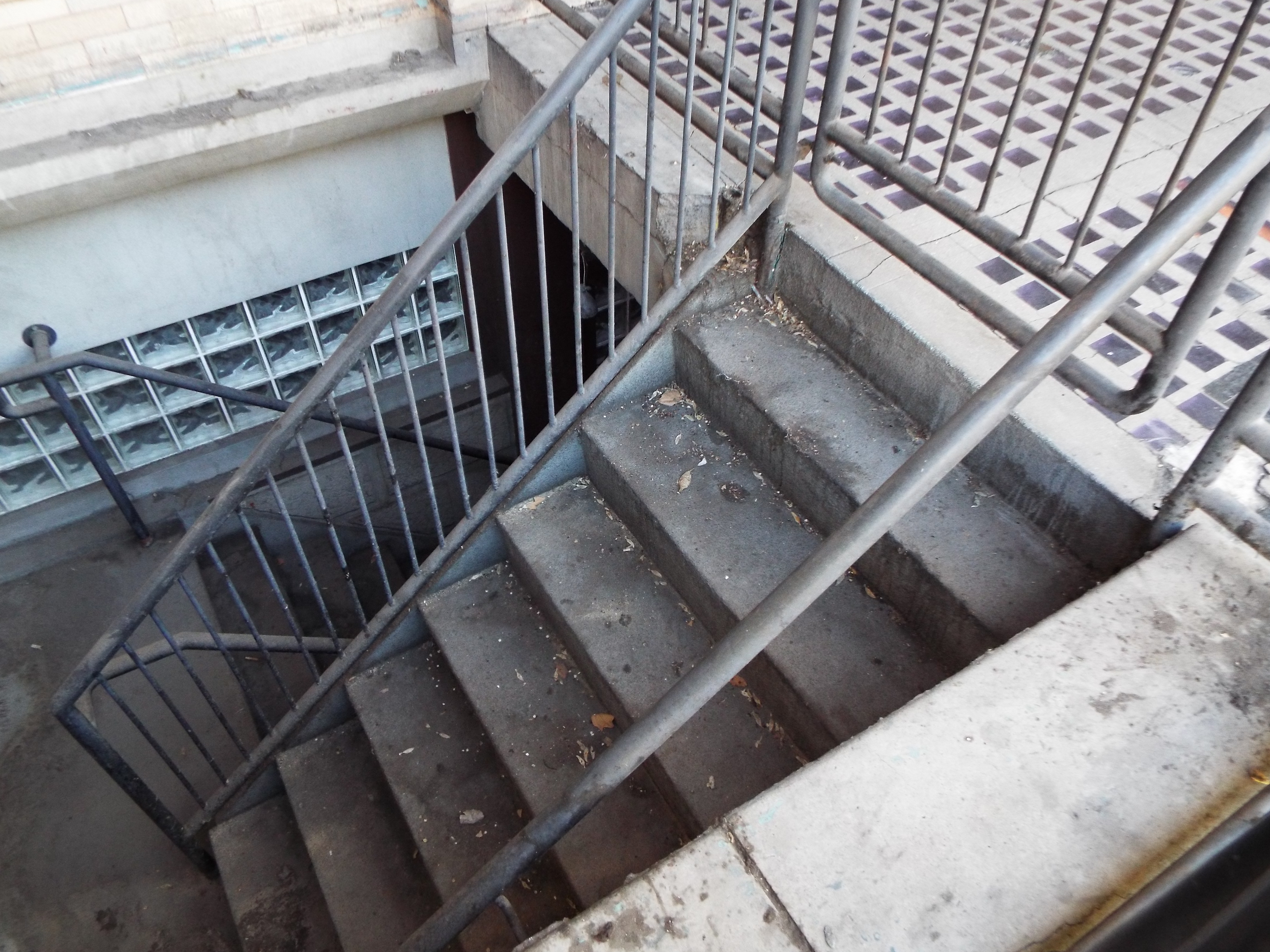
Downstairs to opium den
