= 13th Arizona Territorial Legislature =

Session of the Arizona Territorial Legislature (1885)

←	12th	14th	→

Overview
- Legislative body: Arizona Territorial Legislature
- Jurisdiction: Arizona Territory, United States
- Term: January 12, 1885 –

Council
- Members: 12
- President: F. K. Ainsworth

House of Representatives
- Members: 24
- Speaker: H. G. Rollins

The 13th Arizona Territorial Legislative Assembly was a session of the Arizona Territorial Legislature which began on January 12, 1885, in Prescott, Arizona. The session's accomplishments included allocation of a variety of territorial institutions including a university, normal school, prison, and insane asylum. Nicknames bestowed to the session include the "bloody thirteenth" due to fights in the halls of government and nearby saloons, and the "thieving thirteenth" due to the very large appropriations approved by this legislature.

== Background ==
During the Apache Wars, the primary source of cash for many Arizona towns was a nearby military post. By the mid-1880s, subjugation of the Apache was largely completed and the settlements saw territorial institutions as an economic replacement for the forts. The territorial capital and an anticipated insane asylum were considered the best source of revenues. A potential university and normal school were considered of lesser importance with a common line of the day being, "Who ever heard of a professor buying a drink?"

The other big concern facing the territory was an influx of Mormon settlers. About 2000 Mormon settlers had arrived in Arizona Territory during 1884, raising their totals to 5000 settlers, and their political opponents suspected the LDS Church was trying to create a large enough voting bloc to take over Arizona (at the time a majority of Idaho's legislature was Mormon and the church had been able to determine Wyoming's delegate to Congress). In response to the influx, five of the settlers were tried and convicted of polygamy. Political response to the convictions was largely favorable, with the New York Times writing, "This is a very good beginning. If there are among the new settlers other men who have violated the law they should be promptly prosecuted and sent to the penitentiary. In no other way can the growth of polygamy in Arizona be checked."

Prior to the legislative session, a group of Tucson businessmen had raised a US$5,000 slush fund to lobby for the return of the territorial capital. The delegation from Pima County was delayed by flooding on the Salt River, forcing a detour through Los Angeles and Sacramento, California, before they could reach Prescott. While this detour was occurring, 7 of the 12 members of the Council met privately and had reached an agreement to block any legislation that would move the capital from Prescott, the penitentiary from Yuma, weaken anti-Mormon legislation, divide Cochise county, or create anti-railroad legislation.

== Legislative session ==
The legislative session had been scheduled to begin on January 12, 1885, but due to delays in member's arrivals the session was unable to form a quorum until January 19 in the House and January 21 in the council. Among the first problems befalling the session was dealing with travel expenses. The detours taken to avoid flooding on the Salt River resulted in the members from Pima County requesting US$330 each for the 2,200 miles (3,500 km) journey to and from Prescott. To this was added a claim by F.K. Ainsworth, a resident of Prescott, for US$225 in travel expenses under the belief he could claim a journey from any point in the territory he represented. In an effort to keep expenses under the US$25,960 authorized by the U. S. Congress for the session, Territorial Treasurer H. M. Van Arman decided to only pay members their four dollar per diem for days they actually served in the session. The legislatures compensated for this limitation by consuming a greater volume of stationery and other supplies than had been budgeted for.

During the session there were several instances of legislative violence, both within the halls of government and the nearby saloons. One such instance occurred when Council member W. C. Bridwell struck a lobbyist for the Arizona Copper Company, resulting in a bloody nose and broken glasses for the lobbyist. The lobbyist responded by challenging Bridwell to a duel. The two men were separated by mutual friends before they could decide upon appropriate weapons. Another instance involved a feud fought with bullwhip and a monkey wrench.

=== Governor's address ===
Frederick Augustus Tritle spoke to the legislature on January 24, 1885. Tritle's interest in agriculture was emphasized during the address, and he recommended the legislature ask the U.S. Congress for funds to provide funds to a geological survey designed to locate water sources within the territory along with locations suitable for creating water reservoirs. Other concerns raised included legislation to prevent Texas cattle fever from spreading to Arizona and creation of a permanent militia. Tritle also used the occasion to call for the United States to purchase land from Mexico for the purpose of providing Arizona with direct access to the Pacific Ocean.

=== Legislation ===
The key pieces of legislation passed by the session involved allocation of various institutions throughout the territory. The 13th allowed the territorial capital remain in Prescott and Yuma kept the territorial prison. Despite claims that it would be less expensive to continue a deal allowing the territory to send mental patients to a Stockton, California facility at a cost to the territory of six dollars per day, Phoenix received a US$100,000 appropriation for a new insane asylum. Funds for a new levee near Yuma were approved along with US$12,000 for a new bridge over the Gila River near Florence. An allocation of US$5,000 was made for a normal school in Tempe.

Upon seeing the other political plums already picked, Selim M. Franklin made an appeal near the end of the session to locate a university in Tucson saying, "We have been called the Fighting Thirteenth, the Bloody Thirteenth and the Thieving Thirteenth. We have deserved these names and we know it. ... Here is an opportunity to wash away our sins. Let us establish an institution of learning, where for all time to come the youth of the land may learn to become better citizens than we are, and all our shortcomings will be forgotten in a misty past and we will be remembered for this one great achievement."

Other actions taken by the session included authorizing US$292,000 in bonds for a railroad connecting Prescott to the Atlantic and Pacific Railroad and US$200,000 in bonds for a rail link from Phoenix to the Southern Pacific line in Maricopa. A bill to reinstate a bullion tax was rejected and a proposal to create the County of Sierra Bonita, with Willcox as the county seat, was rejected by a single vote.

== Aftermath ==
Following the close of the legislative session there were a number of events that occurred because of the session. As part of the bills authorizing creation of the university and normal school, each receiving community was required to donate a plot of land for the new schools. Tempe enthusiastically accepted the normal school and arranged for the needed 20 acres (0.081 km^{2}); the Tempe Normal School eventually expanded, ending up as Arizona State University. Tucson was much less enthusiastic about receiving the university and if not for two gamblers and a saloon keeper donating 40 acres (0.16 km^{2}) east of the town for campus, the town would have allowed the university authorization to expire. The University of Arizona remains in Tucson to this day. After completion of the bridge near Florence, the Gila shifted course away from the bridge site.

Several investigations into events of legislative session were conducted. A federal grand jury in Tucson found the 13th Arizona Territorial Legislature exceeded the $4000 legal limitation for operating expenses by $46,745. A latter grand jury meeting in Prescott reported the legislature had authorized US$19,967 in printing expenses and spent US$3,077 to deliver territorial newspapers to legislators. The session was also found to have exceeded federal staffing limitations by employing fifty-one clerks, eight janitors, and four pages.

== Members ==
House of Representatives
Name	County	Name	County
E. W. Aram	Pima	Lafayette P. Nash	Yavapai
John S. Armstrong	Maricopa	William F. Nichols	Cochise
D. J. Brannen	Yavapai	Hugh Percy	Cochise
G. W. Brown	Pima	DeForest Porter	Maricopa
Julius A. Brown	Yavapai	Samuel Purdy Jr.	Yuma
Robert Connell	Yavapai	E. W. Risley	Pima
W. F. Frame	Cochise	W. H. Robbins	Yavapai
Selim M. Franklin	Pima	H. G. Rollins (Speaker)	Pima
J. D. Houck	Apache	Levi Ruggles	Pinal
Thomas T. Hunter	Cochise	James Sias	Graham
William Imus	Mohave	D. K. Wardwell	Cochise
Luther Martin	Apache	W. C. Watkins	Gila

Council
Name	County
F. K. Ainsworth (President)	Northern District
Alonzo Bailey	Gila
W. C. Bridwell	Graham
John W. Dorrington	Yuma
W. A. Harwood	Cochise
John Howell	Mohave
Robert N. Leatherwood	Pima
C. C. Stevens	Southern District
W. G. Stewart	Yavapai
E. S. Stover	Apache
R. B. Todd	Maricopa
Thomas F. Weedin	Pinal

- The Northern District was composed of Apache, Maricopa, Mohave, Yuma, and Yavapai counties, while the Southern District encompassed Cochise, Gila, Graham, Pima, and Pinal counties.
