= Whiskey Row, Prescott =

Entertainment district in Prescott, Arizona

Coordinates: 34.5408°N 112.4703°W

Whiskey Row
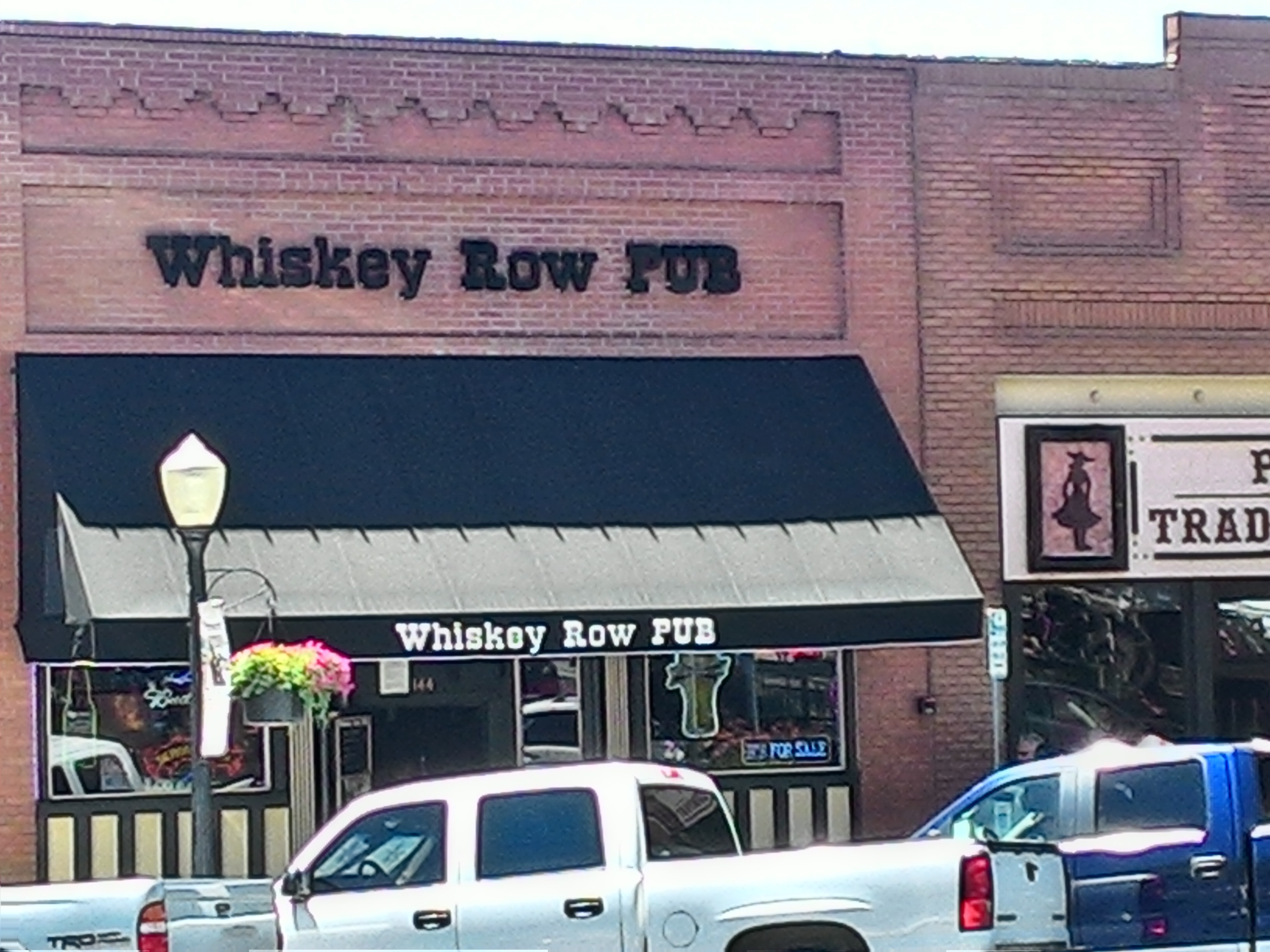
- A pub on Whiskey Row in 2017
- Built: 1877, 1900
- Architectural style(s): Western
- Governing body: Arizona Historical Society

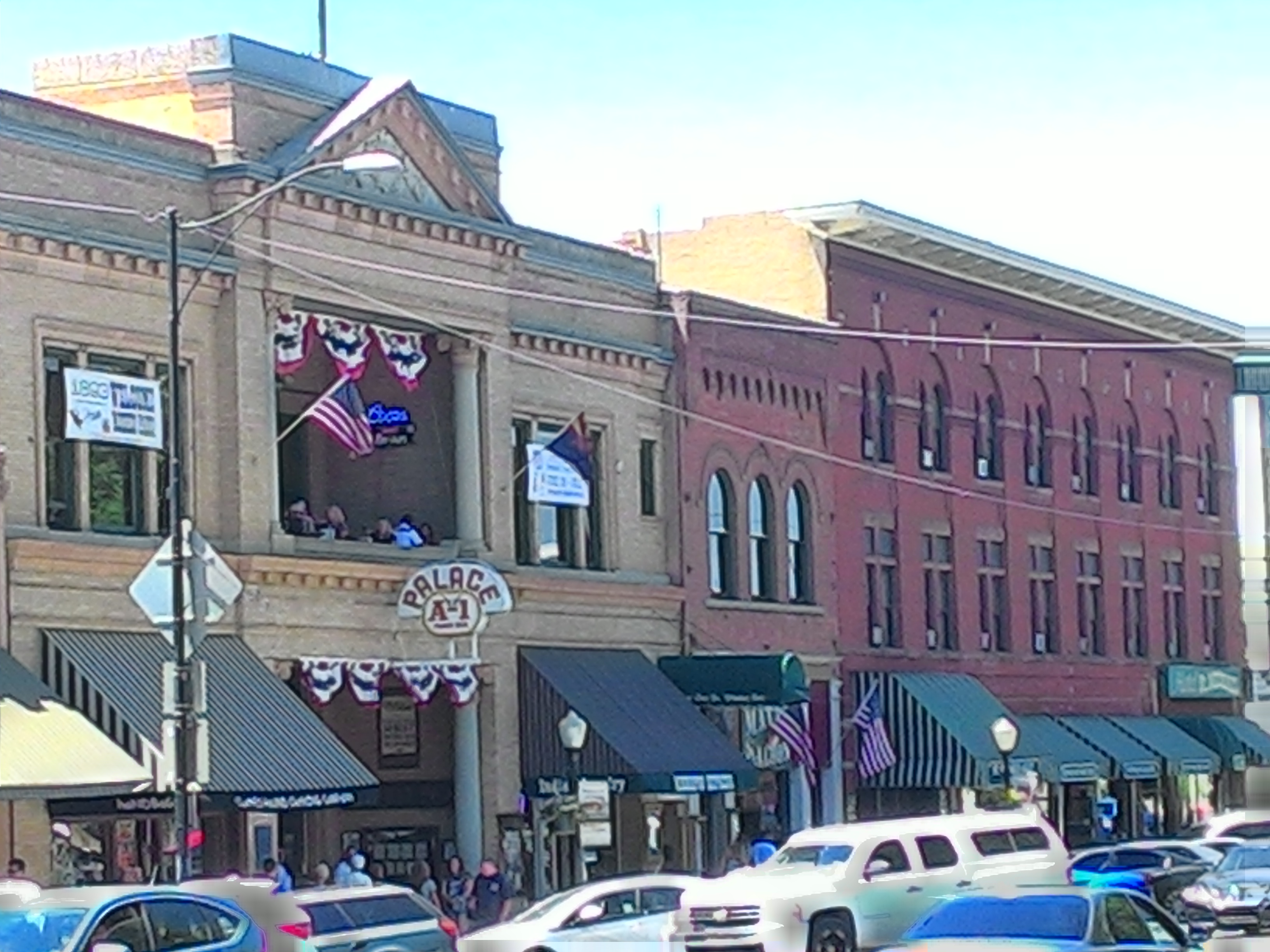
View of Montezuma Street near Gurley

Whiskey Row is a block in Prescott, Arizona, existing on Montezuma Street between Goodwin and Gurley Streets, although it did spill over onto adjacent streets from time to time. The original Whiskey Row occupied the 100 block of Montezuma Street and portions of the adjacent Cortez and Granite Streets. Shortly after Prescott's founding in 1864, an area near the center of town began to accumulate saloons and other entertainment venues.

The establishment of the district is shrouded in myth and anecdote. However, after the fire of 1877, the position of Whiskey Row became more established, even though the name "Whiskey Row" did not appear in print until 1883 after a second fire destroyed most of the block. A third devastating fire, in 1900, led to the district being rebuilt once more, although several of the early establishments continued on after the rebuilding. At one point, there were more than 40 saloons standing next to one another in the district.

== History ==
The origins of Whiskey Row remain unclear. Some anecdotes place the origin of the district shortly after the establishment of Prescott in 1864, when Isaac Goldberg was said to have established a rudimentary bar in Prescott, although it may have been further south outside of town, closer to the mining camps. Some accounts prior to 1877 place Whiskey Row closer to Granite Creek, and it was only moved to its existing location due to the danger of inebriated patrons having to cross the creek.

In 1897 Whiskey Row became the first section of Prescott to have exterior public lighting installed.

Wyatt Earp, his brother Virgil (who served as Prescott constable), and Doc Holliday were all frequent visitors of The Palace Restaurant and Saloon on Whiskey Row. The Palace was opened in 1877 and still operates, making it the oldest business in Arizona.

On July 14, 1900, another major fire struck Prescott, destroying five full city blocks, including most of Whiskey Row. It became known as "The Great Fire". Property damages were initially estimated to have exceeded $1,000,000, with less than a quarter of that covered by insurance. At least fifty temporary buildings for the lost businesses were erected across the street on the Courthouse plaza. Later in 1900, the losses had increased to over $1,500,000, with only $360,000 of that was covered by insurance. By 1901, the district had been rebuilt, and was the center of activity for the town, known for its gambling as well as its saloons.
