= List of Arizona suffragists =

This is a list of Arizona suffragists, suffrage groups and others associated with the cause of women's suffrage in Arizona.

== Groups ==
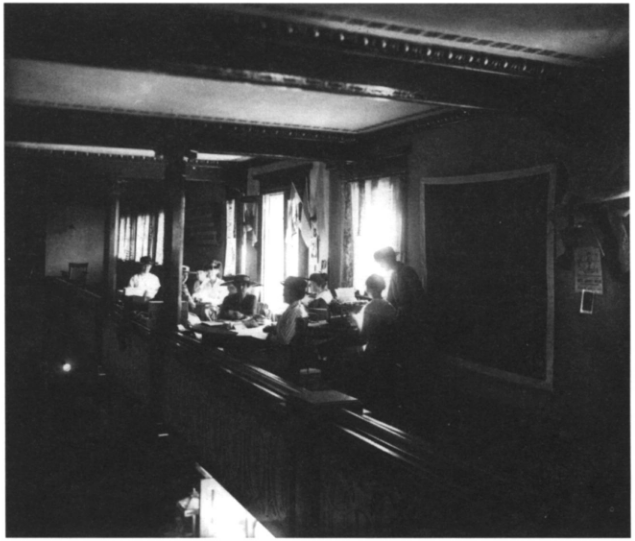
Women's political group in Arizona, c. 1910

- Arizona Equal Suffrage Association (AESA)
- Arizona Federation of Colored Women's Clubs (AFCWC), created around 1915
- Arizona Suffrage Association, formed in 1891
- Arizona Woman's Equal Rights Association (AWERA), founded in 1887
- Equal Suffrage Club of Pima County
- Phoenix Civic League
- Women's Christian Temperance Union (WCTU) of Arizona

== Suffragists ==
- Alice M. Birdsall (Globe)
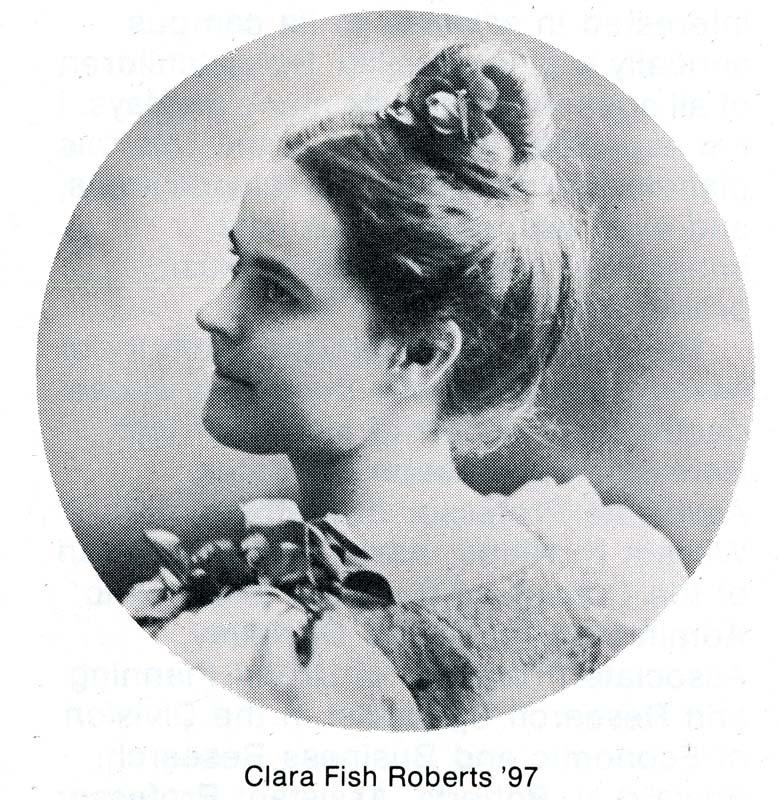
  Clara Fish Roberts in 1897
- C. Louise Boehringer
- Rosa Meador Goodrich Boido (Pima County)
- Laura Gregg Cannon
- Emma Beck Evans Coleman (Graham County)
- Maybelle Craig (Phoenix)
- Anna Murray Doan
- Lucy Terrill Ellis
- Marie Victoria Ackerman Herren Garvin (Yuma)
- Abbie Haskin
- Sallie Davis Hayden (Tempe).
- Nellie Hayward
- Maie Bartlett Heard (Phoenix)
- Josephine Brawley Hughes (Tucson)
- Ada Wallace Irvin
- Sally Jacobs (Phoenix)
- Imogen LaChance
- Elizabeth Layton (Thatcher)
- Inez Lee (Thatcher)
- Theodora Marsh (Nogales)
- Frances Munds (Prescott)
- Ruth May Nowell
- Pauline O'Neill
- Jennie Childers Partch
- Margaret Emily Richey Patterson
- Rose G. Randall (Payson)
- Lida P. Robinson
- Clara M. Schell (Tucson, Arizona)
- Hattie Talbot (Phoenix)
- Madge Udall
- Agnes Wallace (Prescott)
- Mary J. West (Snowflake)
- Anna Westover (Yuma)
- Gertrude Hughes Woodward

=== Politicians supporting women's suffrage ===
- William Herring.
- Louis C. Hughes (Tucson)
- George W. P. Hunt
- Murate Masterson (Prescott)
- Nathan O. Murphy
- Theodore Roosevelt
- Kean St. Charles (Mohave County)

== Places ==
- Hotel Adams (Phoenix)

== Suffragists campaigning in Arizona ==
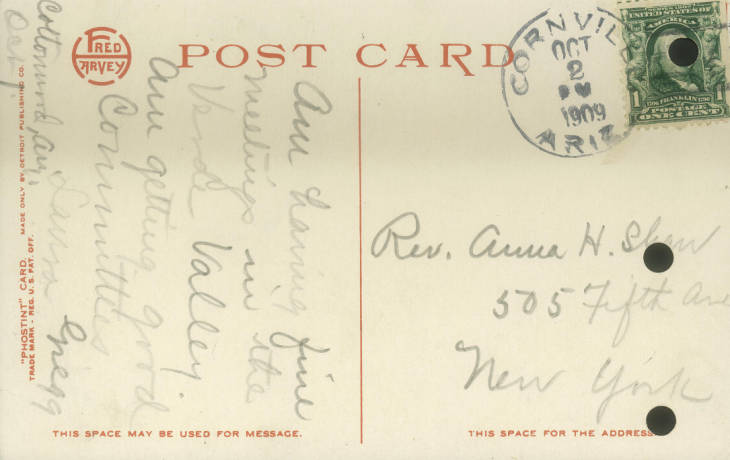
Postcard to Anna Howard Shaw from Laura Gregg about Arizona, October 2, 1909

- Mary C. C. Bradford
- Josephine Casey
- Carrie Chapman Catt
- Laura Clay
- Laura Gregg
- Mary Garrett Hay
- Laura M. Johns
- Alice Park
- Jane Pincus
- Anna Howard Shaw
- Frances Woods

== Anti-suffragists ==
Politicians who opposed women's suffrage

- Joseph H. Kibbey (Phoenix)

Anti-suffragists campaigning in Arizona

- Mabel G. Millard
- Frances Williams

== See also ==
- Timeline of women's suffrage in Arizona
- Women's suffrage in Arizona
- Women's suffrage in states of the United States
- Women's suffrage in the United States
