= Women's suffrage in Arizona =

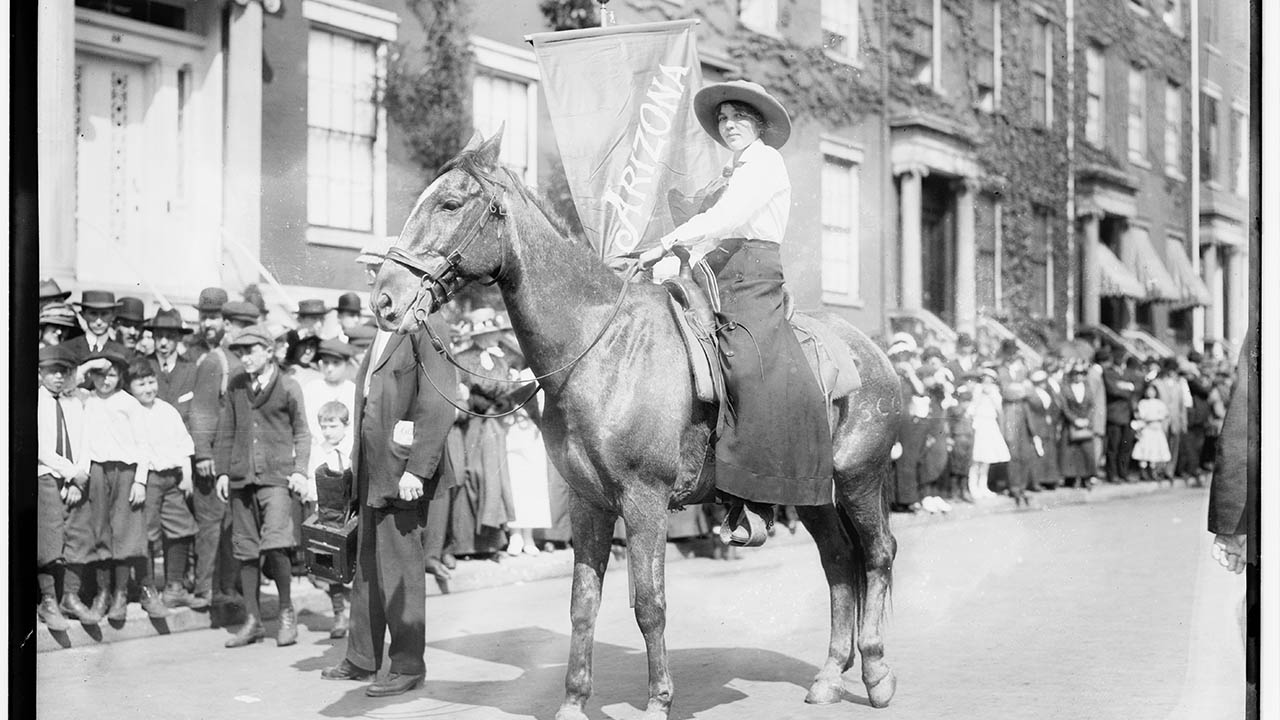
Madge Udall in a 1913 woman suffrage parade

The movement for women's suffrage in Arizona began in the late 1800s. After women's suffrage was narrowly voted down at the 1891 Arizona Constitutional Convention, prominent suffragettes such as Josephine Brawley Hughes and Laura M. Johns formed the Arizona Suffrage Association and began touring the state campaigning for women's right to vote. Momentum built throughout the decade, and after a strenuous campaign in 1903, a woman's suffrage bill passed both houses of the legislature but was ultimately vetoed by Governor Alexander Oswald Brodie.

Efforts picked up again in 1910 when suffragettes Frances Munds and Pauline O'Neill formed the Arizona Equal Suffrage Association (AESA) and focused on the upcoming Arizona Constitutional Convention. After women's suffrage was again defeated, Munds launched a petition drive to put women's suffrage on the November ballot. She and others succeeded in obtaining the requisite number of signatures, and after a strong campaign, the initiative passed in a landslide vote on November 5, 1912. Women were first able to register to vote in 1913 and voted in the state's primary election in 1914. However, some groups still faced barriers due to literacy tests.

== Early efforts ==
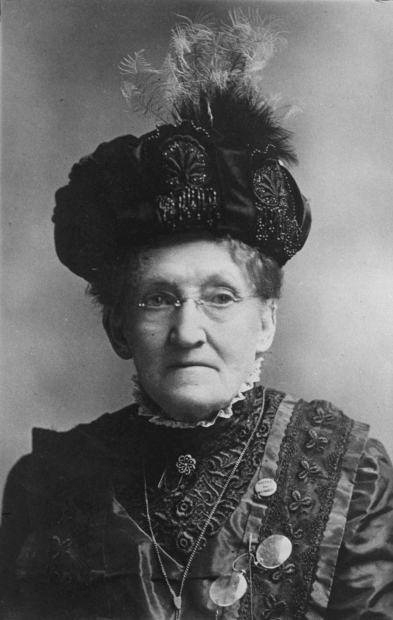
Josephine Brawley Hughes in 1887.

In 1883, Murate Masterson from Prescott introduced a bill to allow women to vote in school board elections. The next year, in 1884, the first chapter of the Women's Christian Temperance Union (WCTU) in Arizona was formed. Josephine Brawley Hughes and Frances Willard toured Arizona to recruit members to the new chapter. The WCTU of Arizona had several successful legislative wins for women's rights. Later Hughes would become president of the state organization in 1890.

In 1891, Henry B. Blackwell and Lucy Stone asked Laura M. Johns, a suffragist from Kansas, to attend the Constitutional Convention for the Territory of Arizona. Johns came to Tucson where she stayed with Josephine Hughes and her husband, Louis C. Hughes. Johns and Josephine Hughes both went to Phoenix to attend the convention. Johns allied with William Herring, a delegate at the convention and the chair of the committee that would hear women's suffrage arguments. Herring was a friend of Hughes and had supported women's suffrage in the past. Johns was able to get permission to address Herring's committee in the parlor of Mrs. E. D. Garlick. The committee went on to report on women's suffrage favorably at the convention and both Hughes and Johns spoke on women's suffrage. The vote to add women's suffrage to the constitution lost by only three votes.

After the convention, Hughes and Garlick formed the Arizona Suffrage Association. Hughes resigned from the WCTU to head the suffrage organization. Johns, who was going to help with suffrage organization in the state, had to go back to Kansas after there was a death in the family. Later, Johns returned to Arizona where she spoke in Phoenix, Tucson and Tempe in 1895. Hughes had been active in organizing clubs around the state. She went as a delegate for Arizona to the National American Woman Suffrage Association (NAWSA) Convention in January 1896. However, later in 1896, due to a scandal surrounding her husband, she lost much of her influence for a time. Johns again spoke on women's suffrage in Arizona in 1897, addressing the territorial legislature. Pauline O'Neill likely helped influence the passage of the school board suffrage bill in 1897. Women who paid taxes could now vote in those elections. In 1899, O'Neill became the president of the Arizona Suffrage Association. Also in 1899, the school board suffrage law was nearly declared invalid by the Arizona Territorial Supreme Court.

In Winter of 1899, Carrie Chapman Catt and Mary Garrett Hay came to Phoenix during the legislative session. Catt, Hay Frances Munds, and O'Neill lobbied the legislators on women's suffrage. Catt described the majority of men in Arizona as being pro-women's suffrage. Though the efforts of Catt and Hay, a women's suffrage bill was created and passed the lower house of the legislature, but was stalled in the upper house. Members of the legislature received threats from liquor interests if they would vote for women's suffrage. Both women returned the next year and worked with the Arizona Suffrage Association.

Lida P. Robinson, the corresponding secretary of the Arizona Suffrage Association, helped push for the passage of another women's suffrage bill in 1901. In 1902, Robinson called for a suffrage convention to be held in Phoenix. She was elected officer of the Arizona Suffrage Association and Munds became the corresponding and recording secretary. Robinson created a list of suffrage supporters in the state and notified them when issues would come up. Robinson and Munds both had connections with the labor movement and were able to help further organize suffrage groups around the state. Another suffrage mass meeting was held in Phoenix in 1903. Members of the suffrage group lobbied forcefully for women's suffrage. Munds, O'Neill, and Robinson worked with Senator Kean St. Charles to bring the bill to the Territorial Council after it passed the House. The suffrage bill passed both houses of the legislature, but was vetoed by Governor Alexander Oswald Brodie. Publicly, Governor Brodie claimed that the bill would go against the United States Constitution. Privately, he shared that the vote would give Mormons "too much power in government."

The women's suffrage movement in Arizona stalled. Robinson moved out of Arizona in 1905. Efforts to revive organizations with NAWSA field worker, Mary C. C. Bradford, in 1905 were not met with enthusiasm.

== Renewed efforts ==
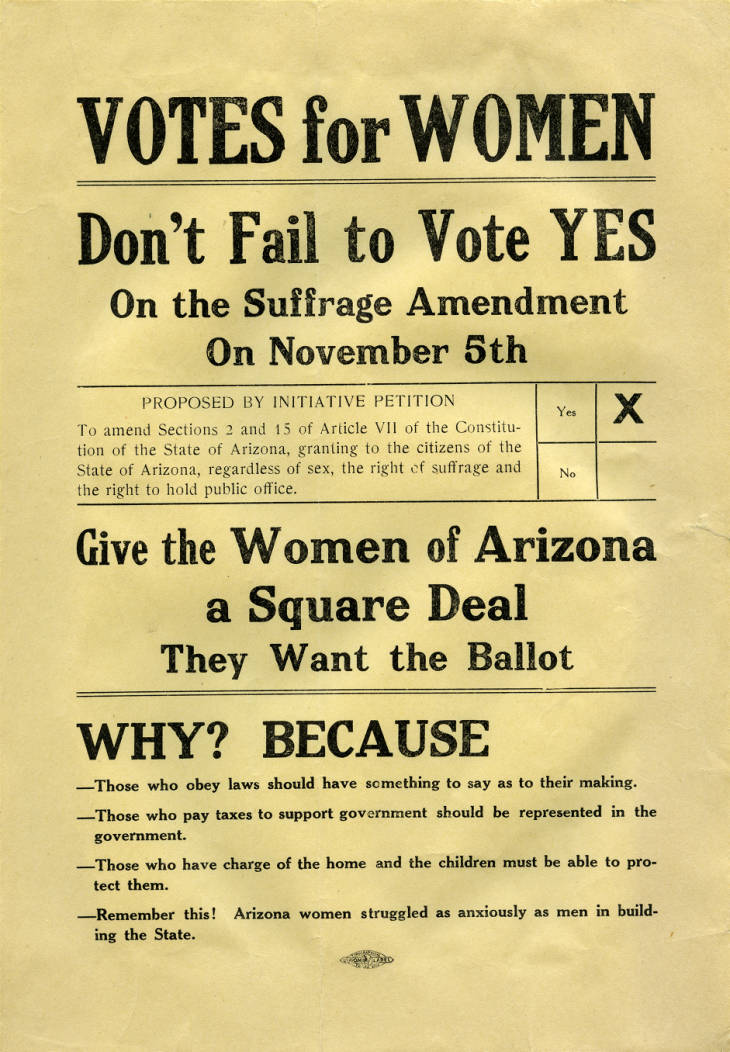
Votes for Women Arizona 1912

Suffrage efforts took on a renewed focus as it looked likely that Arizona would be admitted as a state. Anna Howard Shaw sent NAWSA field worker, Laura Clay, to Arizona in January 1909 to persuade Munds to revive the women's suffrage organizations. Clay and Munds lobbied the territorial legislature in the spring of 1909 on women's suffrage, but bills failed in both houses. Another convention was held in Phoenix that year and the next year, Laura Gregg came to Arizona to organize more women's suffrage groups in Arizona. She met with thousands of people throughout the state, traveling in difficult conditions. Gregg also helped to organize Mormon women who were a significant demographic in the state. Mexican Americans approached her on her trip and asked when suffragists were going to talk to them.

Munds and O'Neill decided to refocus their efforts on getting a women's suffrage amendment in the Arizona Constitution. A new group was formed with Munds as president, the Arizona Equal Suffrage Association (AESA). Munds was determined that only men who supported women's suffrage would be included as delegates to the constitutional convention that was on the horizon. Lobbying efforts only secured the promise of a third of the delegates to vote for women's suffrage. The convention convened in October 1910. Gregg brought a petition for women's suffrage with more than 3,000 signatures in support. Suffragists packed the gallery. Both Munds and Gregg lobbied the delegates for women's suffrage, but they were unsuccessful. George W. P. Hunt, the president of the convention, feared that if women's suffrage was included, the United States would reject Arizona's bid for statehood. Taxpaying women were still allowed to vote in school board elections.

Arizona became a state on February 14, 1912. Hunt became governor of Arizona. Suffragists "bombarded" Hunt with requests for a women's suffrage amendment to the state constitution. Hunt went on to recommend that the Arizona Legislature bring up a women's suffrage bill. Senator John Hughes, son of Josephine Brawley Hughes, brought up a women's suffrage bill. The bill failed by one vote in the Senate, but passed the House.

Munds began a petition campaign to get women's suffrage placed on the November ballot. During six weeks in the scorching Arizona summer suffragists managed to get more than 4,000 signatures from men of all backgrounds from around the state. The initiative for a women's suffrage amendment could now be placed on the ballot. Munds submitted the petition on July 5 to the state legislature and the initiative was placed on the November ballot.

Munds opened up suffrage headquarters in Hotel Adams. She modeled her campaign on those run in California and Washington for women's suffrage. She hired Madge Udall, her son's fiancée, to help run the campaign. NAWSA sent Alice Park to help with the suffrage work and contributed $2,200 for the campaign. Munds and Governor Hunt also contributed money to the cause. Anna Howard Shaw visited, making seven different speeches around Arizona that drew "large and enthusiastic crowds." Laura Gregg Cannon returned to help campaign, especially targeting mining communities. Public officials from Maricopa County volunteered their time to speak throughout the state. During the first Arizona State Fair in October, Munds secured a women's suffrage booth. Suffragists gave out "more than 20,000 buttons, badges, and leaflets" at the fair. Also by October, 95 percent of the labor unions in the state officially endorsed women's suffrage. Suffragists addressed the Democratic and Republican state conventions in October. Socialist Party speakers also worked with the suffragists. Theodore Roosevelt also spoke about his support of women's suffrage during his fall tour of Arizona. Munds also coordinated with local newspapers to get favorable press and opinion pieces on women's suffrage published. A "Votes for Women" banner that "mysteriously appeared and disappeared around" Phoenix made the news four times.

The vote was on November 5, 1912 and Munds worked outside of polling locations in Phoenix. When she found there was voter intimidation from the liquor interests, she found and threatened one of the political bosses aligned with their interests. Her threat worked and he helped stop the intimidation. The suffrage amendment received 13,442 for and 6,202 against.

== Women voters and ratification ==
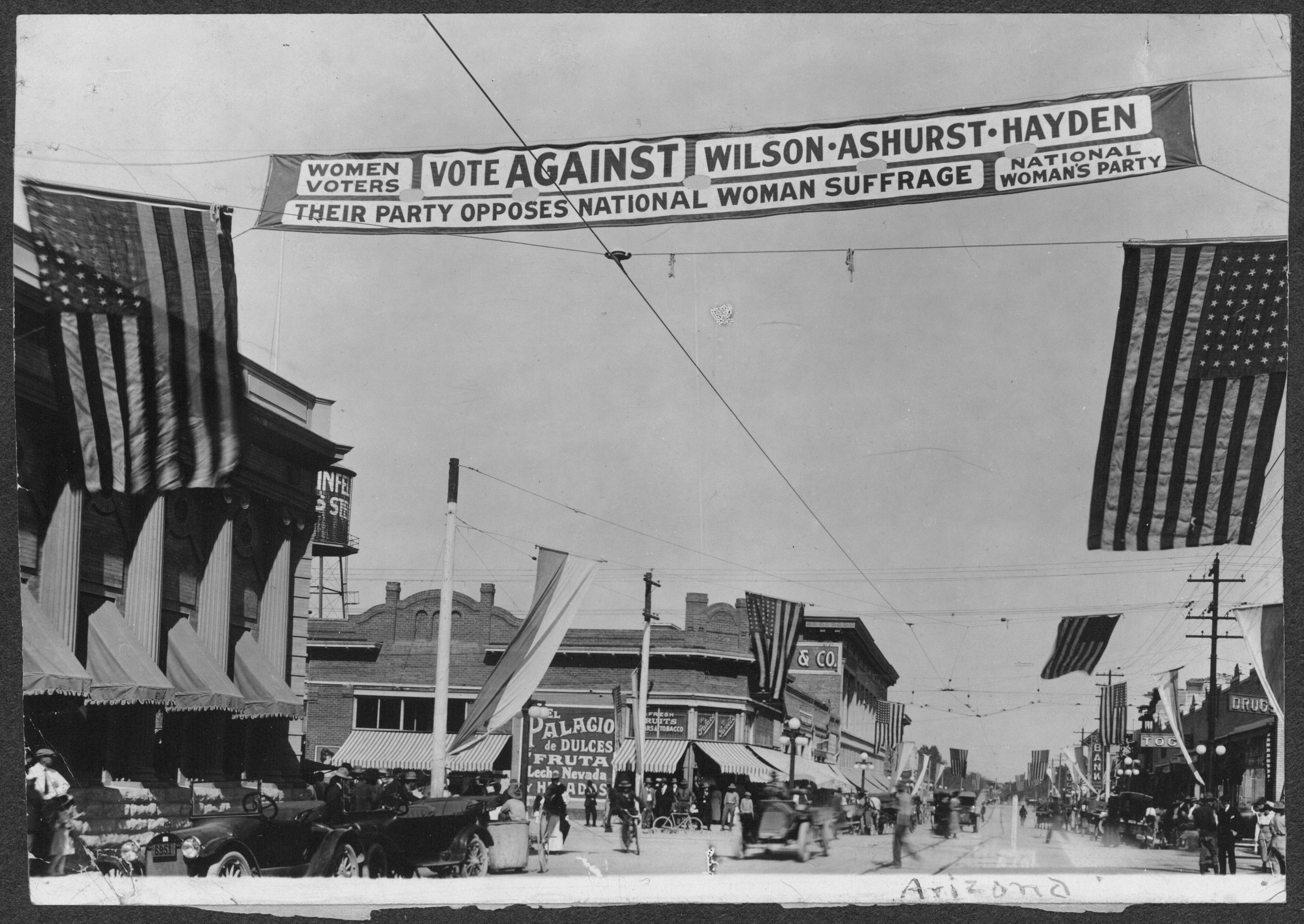
Controversial Party Banner in Tucson, Arizona, 1916

In 1913, the Arizona State Legislature passed an emergency law to open voter registration books to women. Clara Fish Roberts became the first woman to register to vote in Pima County. Women voters in Arizona were able to participate in the Arizona state primary elections in 1914. Also in 1914, Alice Paul sent Congressional Union (CU) organizers, Josephine Casey and Jane Pincus, to Arizona. The CU organizers campaigned against Democrats and were seen as "outsiders and extremists." March 15, 1915 was the first day that women voters could register to participate in full equal suffrage. The CU came back through Arizona on the Suffrage Special tour in 1916.

When the Nineteenth Amendment went to the states for ratification, Arizona Governor Thomas E. Campbell called for a special legislative session on February 12, 1920. The amendment was ratified by Arizona on the same day.

== African-American, Mexican American, and Native American women's suffrage in Arizona ==
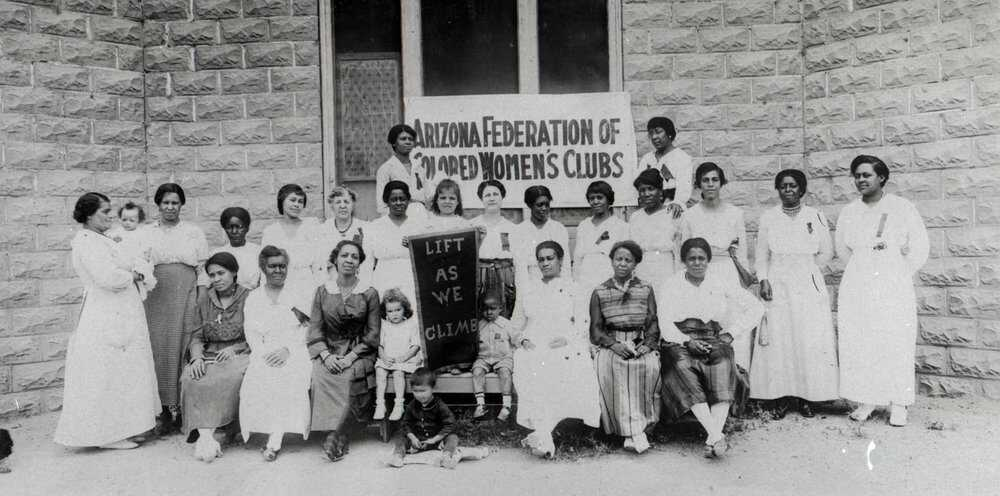
Arizona Federation of Colored Women's Clubs in 1909

The Arizona Equal Suffrage Association (AESA) supported a literacy test law, passed in 1909. In 1910 as Frances Munds and Laura Gregg were organizing suffrage groups around the state, Mexican Americans approached them about women's suffrage. Munds and other suffragists did reach out to "prominent members of the educated Mexican American business and political community." Suffrage materials were also translated into Spanish. However, Anglo suffragists like Munds often excluded non-English speaking Mexican Americans in their campaigns. When Arizona became a state, another literacy test law was passed, which largely disenfranchised many Mexican Americans. Around 1915, Black women in Phoenix created the Arizona Federation on Colored Women's Clubs (AFCWC) which worked in the community and also educated voters.

Native American voters were largely excluded from voting because they were considered non-citizens. In 1924, the Indian Citizenship Act meant that Native Americans could be considered citizens without ending their ties to their tribal customs and lands. When the act passed, Attorney General John W. Murphy felt that Native Americans now possessed the requirements to vote. Murphy reached out to county attorneys in the state to get opinions on the decision. Issues with Native Americans living on reservations called into question the eligibility for voting for some county attorneys. Governor Hunt worried about challenges to his next governor's race if Native Americans turned out to vote.

In 1928, Peter Porter (Pima) and Rudolph Johnson (Pima) were not allowed to register to vote in Pinal County. Porter and Johnson challenged the decision with the Arizona Supreme Court. Pinal County argued that since the men lived on reservations, they were not truly residents of Arizona, and they also argued that Native Americans were wards of the state, and therefore could not vote.

When Native Americans returned from serving in World War II, many wanted to vote. The Arizona Attorney General decided that Native American veterans could vote on a case-by-case basis. Harry Austin (Yavapai) and Frank Harrison (Yavapai) challenged the Arizona Supreme Court for Native American voting rights. The Supreme Court of Arizona ruled on July 15, 1948 that Native Americans in Arizona had the right to vote in state elections.

This win did not give full enfranchisement to Native Americans in Arizona. Literacy tests continued to block Native Americans from registering to vote in Arizona. The Voting Rights Act of 1965 helped to some degree, however language assistance help was not a permanent part of the bill. In 1970, English literacy tests were outlawed. In 2020, many Native American women in Arizona were involved in helping their communities out to vote.

== See also ==
- List of Arizona suffragists
- Timeline of women's suffrage in Arizona
- Women's suffrage in states of the United States
- Women's suffrage in the United States
