= Timeline of women's suffrage in Arizona =

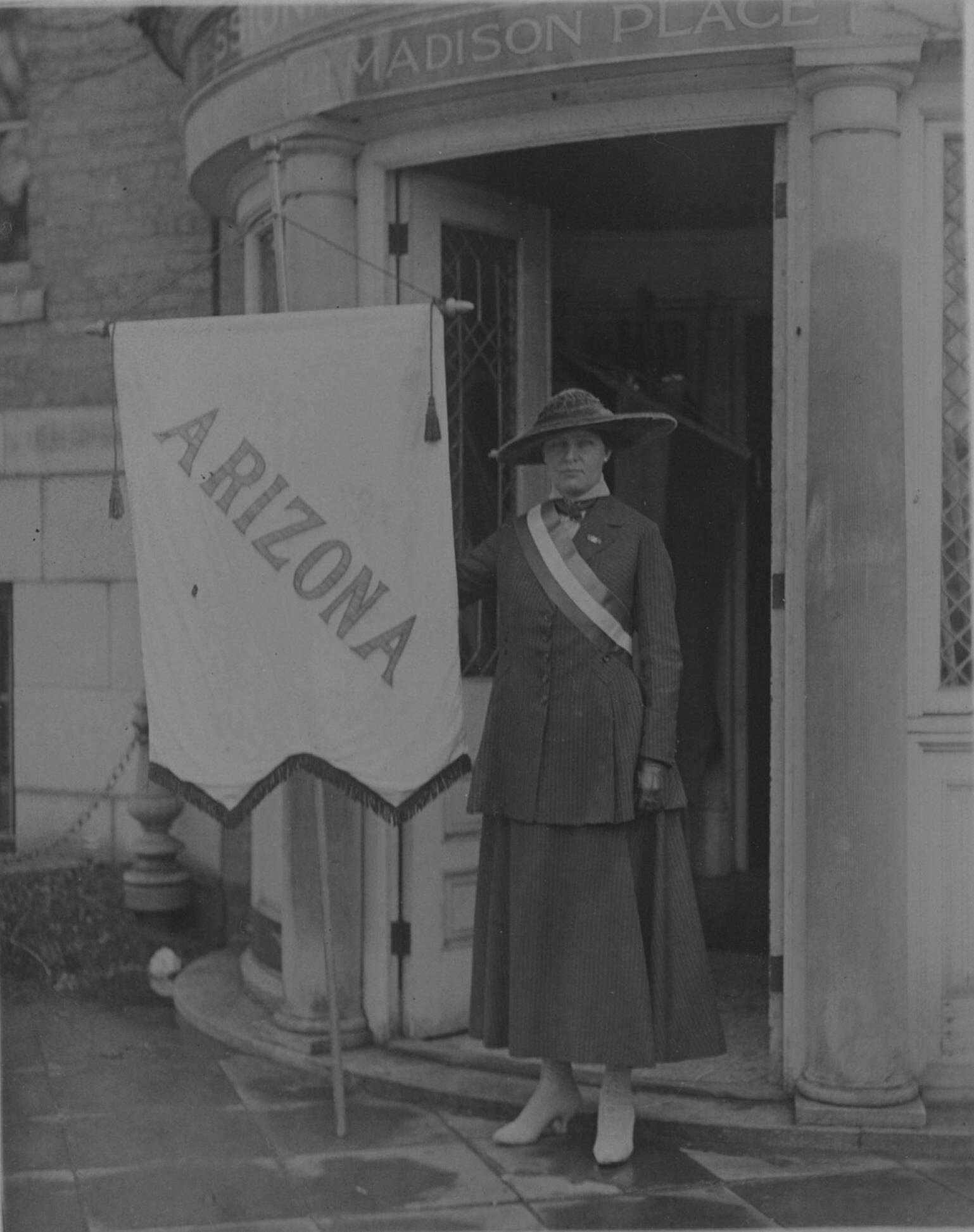
Mrs. Weller in 1917.

This is a timeline of women's suffrage in Arizona. The first women's suffrage bill was brought forward in the Arizona Territorial legislature in 1883, but it did not pass. Suffragists worked to influence the Territorial Constitutional Convention in 1891 but lost by only three votes. That year, the Arizona Suffrage Association was formed. In 1897, taxpaying women gained the right to vote in school board elections. Suffragists from both Arizona and around the country continued to lobby the territorial legislature and organize women's suffrage groups. In 1903, a women's suffrage bill passed, but it was vetoed by the governor. In 1910, suffragists worked to influence the Arizona State Constitutional Convention, but were again unsuccessful. When Arizona became a state on February 14, 1912, an attempt to legislate a women's suffrage amendment to the Arizona Constitution failed. Frances Munds mounted a successful ballot initiative campaign. On November 5, 1912, women's suffrage passed in Arizona. In 1913, the voter registration books were opened to women. In 1914, women participated in their first primary elections. Arizona ratified the Nineteenth Amendment on February 12, 1920. However, Native American women and Latinas would wait longer for full voting rights.

== 19th century ==
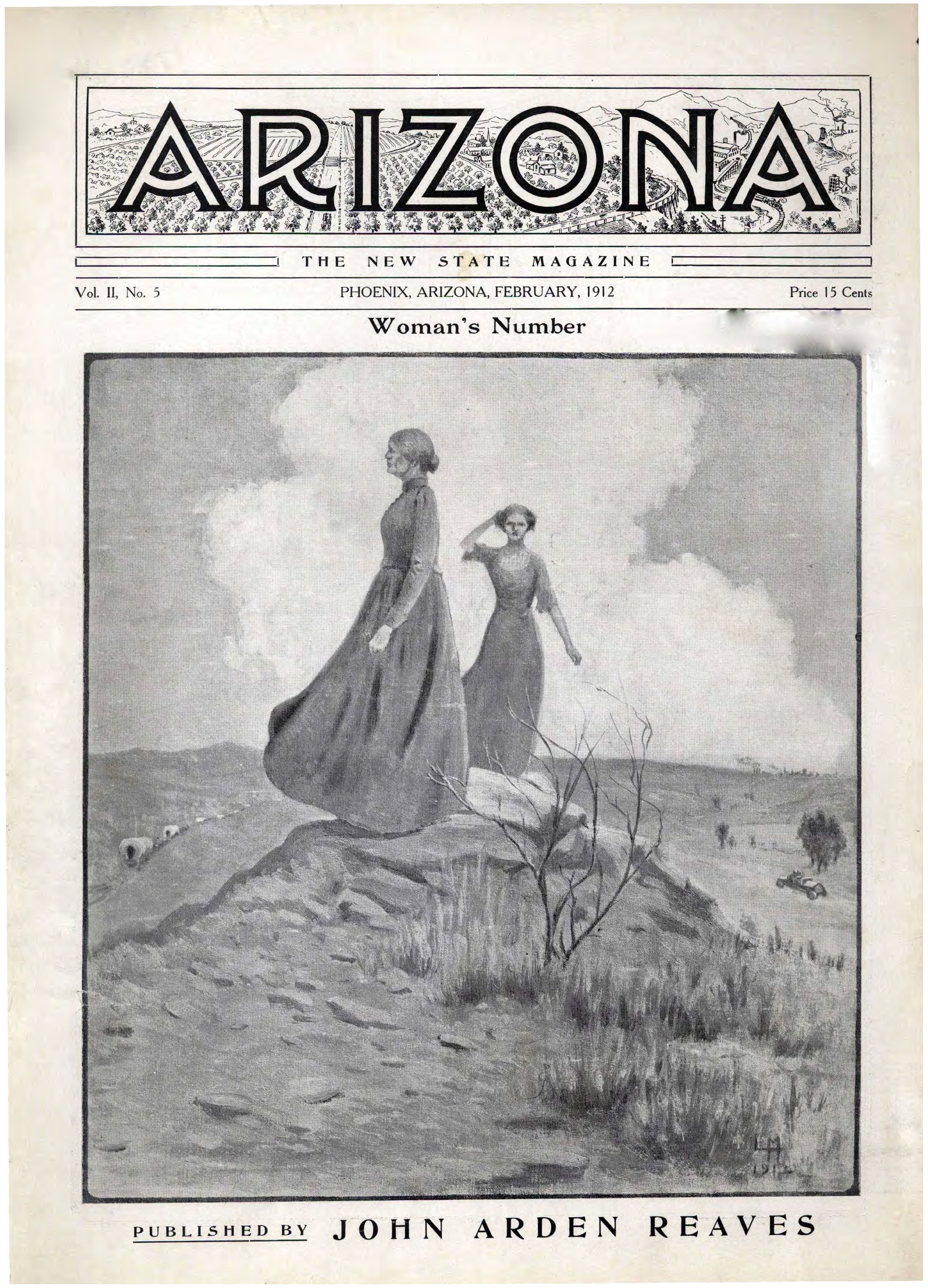
Arizona The New State Magazine Woman's Number, February 1912

=== 1880s ===
1883

- Murat Masterson of Prescott introduces a partial women's suffrage bill for women to vote in school board elections, but it fails.

1884

- The first Arizona chapter of the Women's Christian Temperance Union (WCTU) is formed.

1887

- The Arizona Woman's Equal Rights Association (AWERA) is founded in Phoenix.

=== 1890s ===
1891

- Josephine Brawley Hughes and Laura M. Johns testify on women's suffrage at the Territorial Constitutional Convention.
- Women's suffrage fails at the convention by 3 votes.
- Hughes is part of the founding of the Arizona Suffrage Association.

1895

- Johns speaks in Phoenix, Tempe, and Tucson on women's suffrage.

1896

- January: Hughes attends the National American Woman Suffrage Association (NAWSA) Convention in Washington, D.C.

1897

- Johns addresses the territorial legislature on women's suffrage.
- A bill is passed that allows women taxpayers to vote in school board elections.

1899

- Carrie Chapman Catt visits Phoenix to advocate for women's suffrage.
- A women's suffrage bill passes the lower house of the legislature.
- The school board suffrage law is declared invalid by the Arizona Territorial Supreme Court.

== 20th century ==
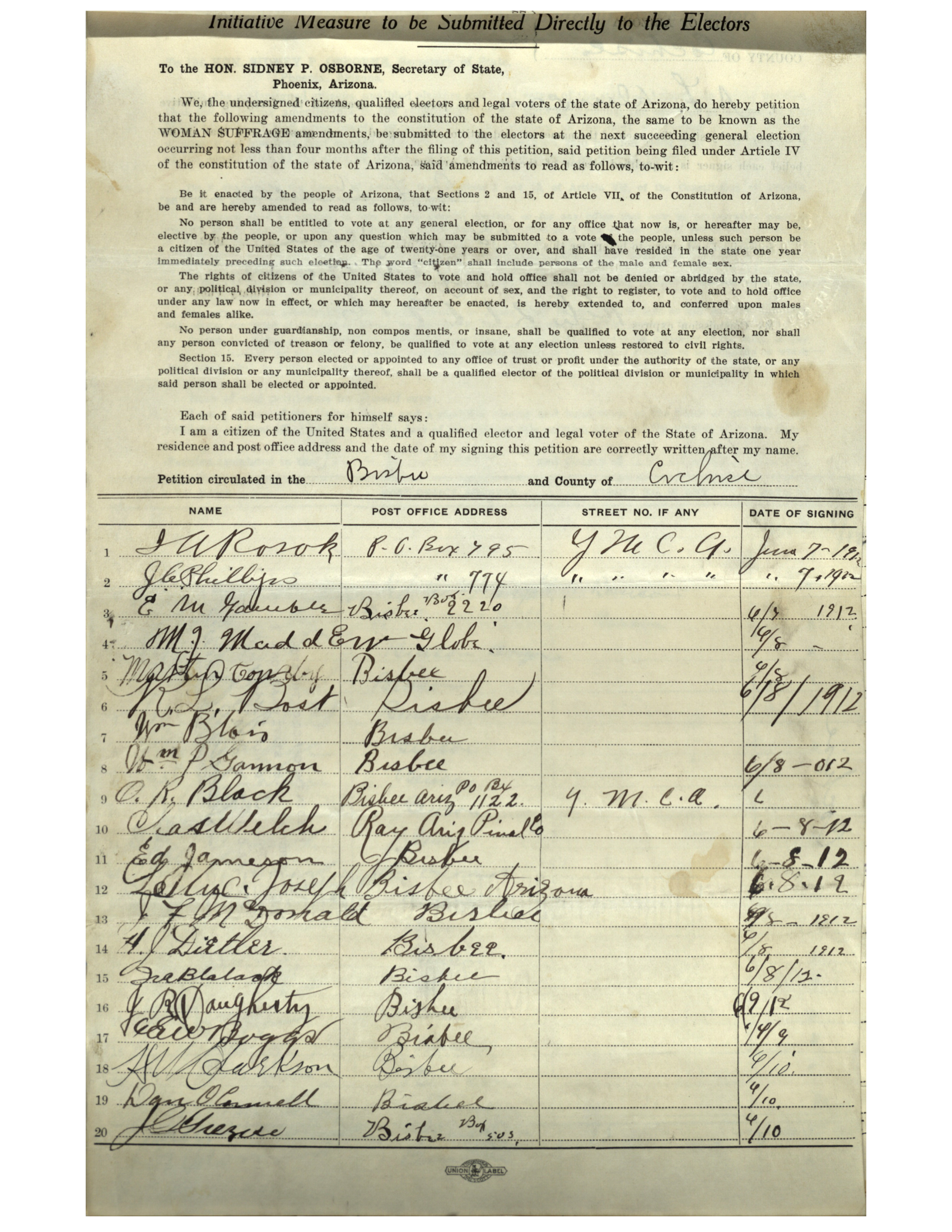
Women's suffrage petition, Arizona July 5, 1912

=== 1900s ===
1901

- Lida P. Robinson works to promote a women's suffrage bill, but it does not pass.

1902

- A women's suffrage convention is held in Phoenix.

1903

- Governor Alexander Oswald Brodie vetoes the women's suffrage bill.

1905

- The women's suffrage movement in Arizona stalls, even as NAWSA sends field worker, Mary C. C. Bradford, to revive interest.

1909

- Laura Clay and Frances Munds lobby the territorial legislature on women's suffrage, but the suffrage bill does not pass.
- The territorial legislature passes a literacy test law, which is supported by the Arizona Equal Suffrage Association.

=== 1910s ===
1910

- Laura Gregg from NAWSA is sent to Arizona to continue organizing suffrage groups around the state.
- October 10: The Arizona Constitutional Convention meets.
- Suffragists lobby the delegates for women's suffrage to be added to the constitution, but are unsuccessful.

1912

- February 14: Arizona becomes a state.
- A women's suffrage amendment bill fails in the Arizona State Legislature by one vote.
- Munds starts a petition campaign to get women's suffrage on the November ballot.
- July 5: Munds gets more than 4,000 signatures, enough to get the women's suffrage initiative on the ballot.
- October: Suffragists have a women's suffrage booth at the Arizona State Fair.
- November 5: Women's equal suffrage becomes part of the Constitution of Arizona.
- Another literacy test law is passed, reducing the number of Mexican American voters.

1913

- January: The Arizona State Legislature hold an emergency session and passes a bill opening the voter registration books to women.
- March 15: Women in Arizona are allowed to register to vote for all elections.
- May: NAWSA holds a celebratory parade in New York City for Arizona, Kansas, and Oregon granting women's suffrage. Madge Udall represents Arizona.

1914

- Women participate in the Arizona primary elections.
- Congressional Union organizers, Josephine Casey and Jane Pincus, come to Arizona.
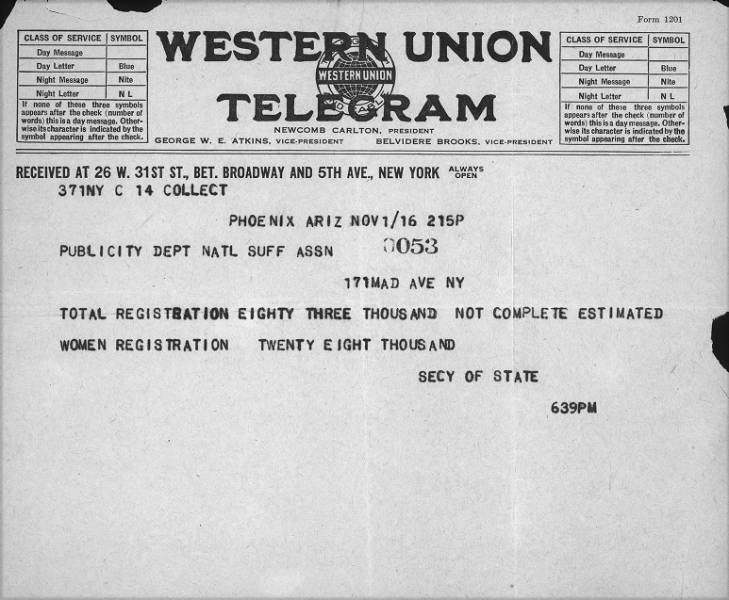
  Telegram to NAWSA from Sidney P. Osborn November 1, 1916

1916

- April 20: The Suffrage Special stops briefly in Maricopa and then arrives in Tucson.
- April 21: The Suffrage Special arrives in Phoenix.

=== 1920s ===
1920

- February 12: Special legislative session convened to ratify the Nineteenth Amendment. It is ratified the same day.

1924

- Native Americans gain United States Citizenship.

=== 1940s ===
1948

- The ban on Native Americans voting in Arizona is overturned by the Arizona Supreme Court.

=== 1960s ===
1965

- The Voting Right Act helps Latina voters exercise their right to vote in Arizona.

=== 1970s ===
1970

- English literacy tests for voting are outlawed in the state.

== See also ==
- List of Arizona suffragists
- Women's suffrage in Arizona
- Women's suffrage in states of the United States
- Women's suffrage in the United States
