= Josephine Brawley Hughes =

American activist (1839–1926)

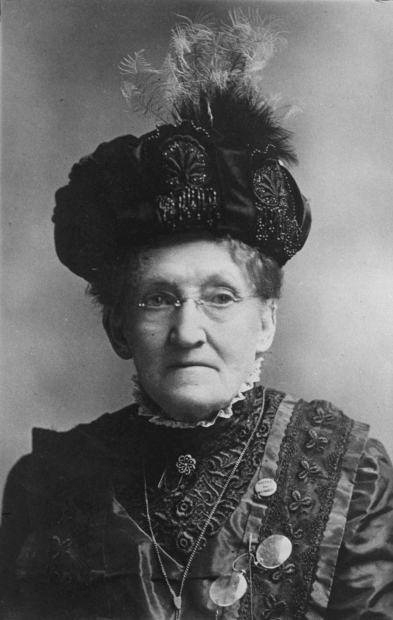
Josephine Brawley Hughes in 1887

Elizabeth Josephine Brawley Hughes (December 22, 1839 – April 22, 1926) was an advocate of women's rights in the United States West region. George W. P. Hunt described her as the Mother of Arizona.

== Biography ==
Elizabeth Josephine Brawley (she dropped her first name later in life) was born on a farm near Meadville, Pennsylvania, on December 22, 1839, to John R. Brawley and Sarah Haskins. After graduating from Edinboro State Normal School, she was a teacher for two years in Pennsylvania public schools.

While a student at Edinboro, she met Louis C. Hughes, whom she married in 1868. Because of a Civil War wound, Louis moved to the Arizona Territory in 1871 and Josephine followed in 1872 with their first child, Gertrude. Josephine and the baby traveled first by rail to San Francisco, then by boat to San Diego, and finally by stagecoach to Tucson. During the trip, Hughes carried a loaded rifle in one arm and her infant daughter in the other. According to a biography by Louise Boehringer in the January 1930 edition of the Arizona Historical Review, at the time of Josephine's arrival, "Only two other (Eastern) homemakers were established in Tucson when the young wife and mother reached her destination–Mrs. Charles Lord (wife of Dr. Lord) and Mrs. C. Scott (wife of Judge C. Scott)." Thus, Hughes may have been the third English-speaking woman in Tucson.

The family lived in an adobe home like the rest of "The Old Pueblo" (a nickname for Tucson), but it did contain the town's first cistern. Hughes had three children after Gertrude: John, Josephine, and a child that died at age two.

Hughes taught in the first public school for girls in Tucson. She also worked in the office of her husband's newspaper, the Arizona Star.

In 1893, Louis was appointed territorial governor by President Grover Cleveland. Their son, John T., later served in the first state Senate.

Louis died in 1915 and John in 1921, leaving Hughes with no other family in Arizona. She moved to California to be closer to her daughter, where she died in 1926.

The Arizona State Capitol building in Phoenix has a bronze plaque in its rotunda in Josephine's honor, placed December 16, 1926.

== Activism ==
Hughes was the first president of the Arizona Women's Christian Temperance Association. The Arizona WCTU, like the national WCTU, believed that women needed the right to vote so that they could regulate alcohol and other forms of vice in their communities. She traveled around the Arizona Territory denouncing "Demon Rum" and promoting temperance.

In 1891, as the push for Arizona statehood began, Hughes helped to found the first woman suffrage organization in Arizona Territory. The organization hoped that women's right to vote would be included in the state constitution. From 1891 to 1900, she was a major advocate for the women's suffrage bill, which was vetoed in 1900 by Governor Alexander Oswald Brodie. Despite her efforts, Arizona's women did not gain the right to vote until 1912.

== Accomplishments ==
- Helped establish the first public girls' school in the Southwest.
- Was the first woman public school teacher in Arizona.
- Joined other women to raise funds for the first Protestant church in Arizona.
- Helped found the Woman's Christian Temperance Union (WCTU) in Arizona.
- Helped found the women's suffrage movement in Arizona.
- Helped to manage and operate the Arizona Daily Star newspaper.

== See also ==
- List of Arizona suffragists
- Timeline of women's suffrage in Arizona
- Women's suffrage in Arizona
- National American Woman Suffrage Association
- Sallie Davis Hayden
- Frances Willard Munds
