= Sallie Davis Hayden =

American activist (1842–1907)

- Born: July 12, 1842
- Died: September 15, 1907 (aged 65)
- Occupations: Educator, Suffragist
- Spouse: Charles T. Hayden (m. 1876; died in 1900)
- Children: Carl Hayden, Sallie Davis, Anna Spenser, Mary "Mapes" Calvert

Sallie Davis Hayden (July 12, 1842 – September 15, 1907) was a suffragist in the Arizona Territory of the United States. She and her husband were founders of Hayden's Ferry, later Tempe, Arizona.

== Biography ==
Sarah Calvert “Sallie” Davis was born near Forrest City, Arkansas, on July 12, 1842, to Cornelius Davis and Eliza Halbert. Her father, a wealthy plantation owner, was strict and did not believe in educating his daughters, so she had a limited formal education as a child. At twelve years old, Davis ran away from her parents' house to her aunt's home to avoid a whipping. She educated herself by reading books at attending school sporadically. Davis began her teaching career in rural Illinois. She then worked as a school teacher in Visalia, California, where she met Arizona businessman Charles Trumbull Hayden (1825–1900) whom she married on October 4, 1876 in Nevada City, California. The newlywed couple traveled to Arizona, where Sallie was surprised at the undeveloped land. She quickly transformed her new home, adding running water, a grass lawn, and the first wood floor in the valley. From 1876 to 1878, she served as postmaster of Hayden's Ferry, Arizona which was later named Tempe.

On October 2, 1877, Hayden gave birth to her first child, Carl Hayden, the first Anglo-Saxon born in the community. They had three more children after Carl, Sarah "Sallie" Davis Haden (b. June 25, 1880), Anna Spencer Hayden (b. March 3, 1883 – 1885) and Mary "Mapes" Calvert Hayden (b. November 21, 1886). Anna Hayden died in 1885 after eating too many green peaches from the family orchard. Sallie believed that her daughter should have received further medical care.

When her children were young, the Hayden family moved a couple of miles outside town to the "Hayden Guest Ranch," which hosted lecturers, distinguished visitors, convalescents, " any educated person with limited means, and lame ducks of every sort." Hayden made the ranch profitable by bringing in cattle.

Hayden was involved in her community, serving on the school board and establishing a local library.

In the 1890s, the Hayden family became involved in water-rights suits due to water scarcity. The family spent considerable money on litigation, and when Charles left the town on business, Sallie defended Hayden water rights with a shotgun.

Hayden was interested in politics and hosted suffragist speakers in her home at Hayden's Ferry. Along with Josephine Brawley Hughes and Frances Willard Munds, Sallie was one of the founders of the suffrage movement in Arizona. In the mid-1890s, she served as the vice-president of the Arizona Territorial Suffrage Association. Every year, she, with president Josephine Brawley Hughes, unsuccessfully worked to get the territorial legislature to pass a woman suffrage bill. Although, Hayden died on September 15, 1907, her legacy continued through her son, United States Senator Carl Hayden (1877–1972). Senator Hayden was elected in 1912 as the first Representative from Arizona. In 1913, in honor of his mother, Carl introduced a joint resolution calling for women's suffrage. However, the resolution did not emerge from the Committee on the Judiciary.
