= Greenfield Hall =

Historic house in New Jersey, United States

- U.S. National Register of Historic Places
- New Jersey Register of Historic Places
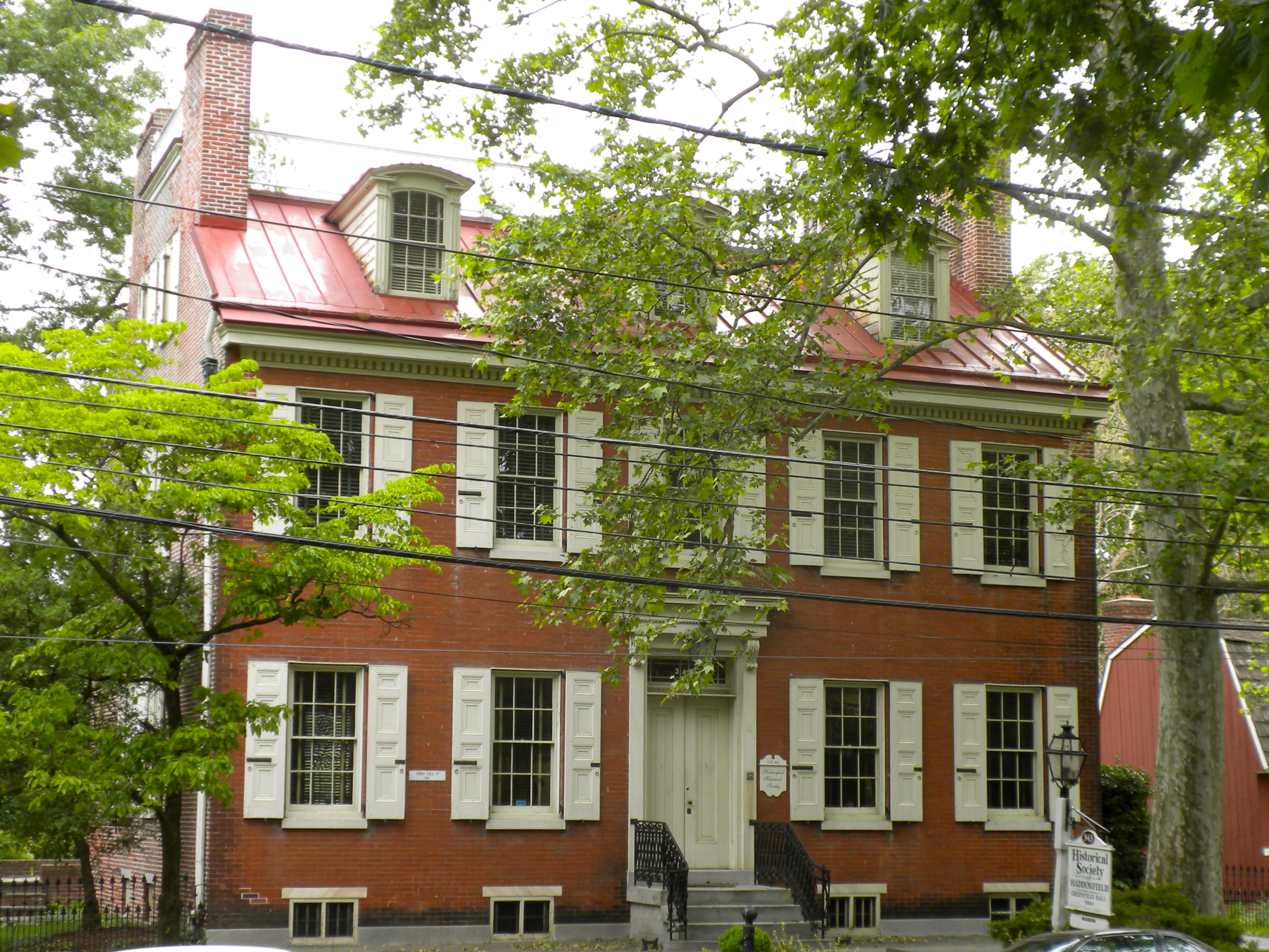

- Location within Camden County, New Jersey Location within New Jersey Location within the United States
- Location: 343 King's Highway East, Haddonfield, New Jersey
- Coordinates: 39°54′02″N 75°01′39″W
- Built: 1747
- NRHP reference No.: 74001158
- NJRHP No.: 971

Significant dates
- Added to NRHP: June 5, 1974
- Designated NJRHP: September 6, 1973

Greenfield Hall, formerly known as the John Gill House, is located at 343 King's Highway East in the borough of Haddonfield in Camden County, New Jersey, United States. The building was built in 1747 and added to the National Register of Historic Places on June 5, 1974, for its significance in exploration/settlement and military history. The Historical Society of Haddonfield operates a museum within the building.

== History ==
The first structure to be built on the property was a small cabin built in 1728 by John Gill Sr. This cabin was later torn down. John Gill Sr.'s son John Gill Jr. built a new house on the property in 1747. In 1841, this house was torn down with the exception of two small rooms and a new house was built in its place. The new house was built by John Gill IV and is a red brick, center-hall 2 1/2-story Georgian-style home. Alexander Oswald Brodie purchased the home in 1916 and lived there until his death two years later. The house then passed through a succession of owners until 1960 when it became the headquarters of the Historical Society of Haddonfield.

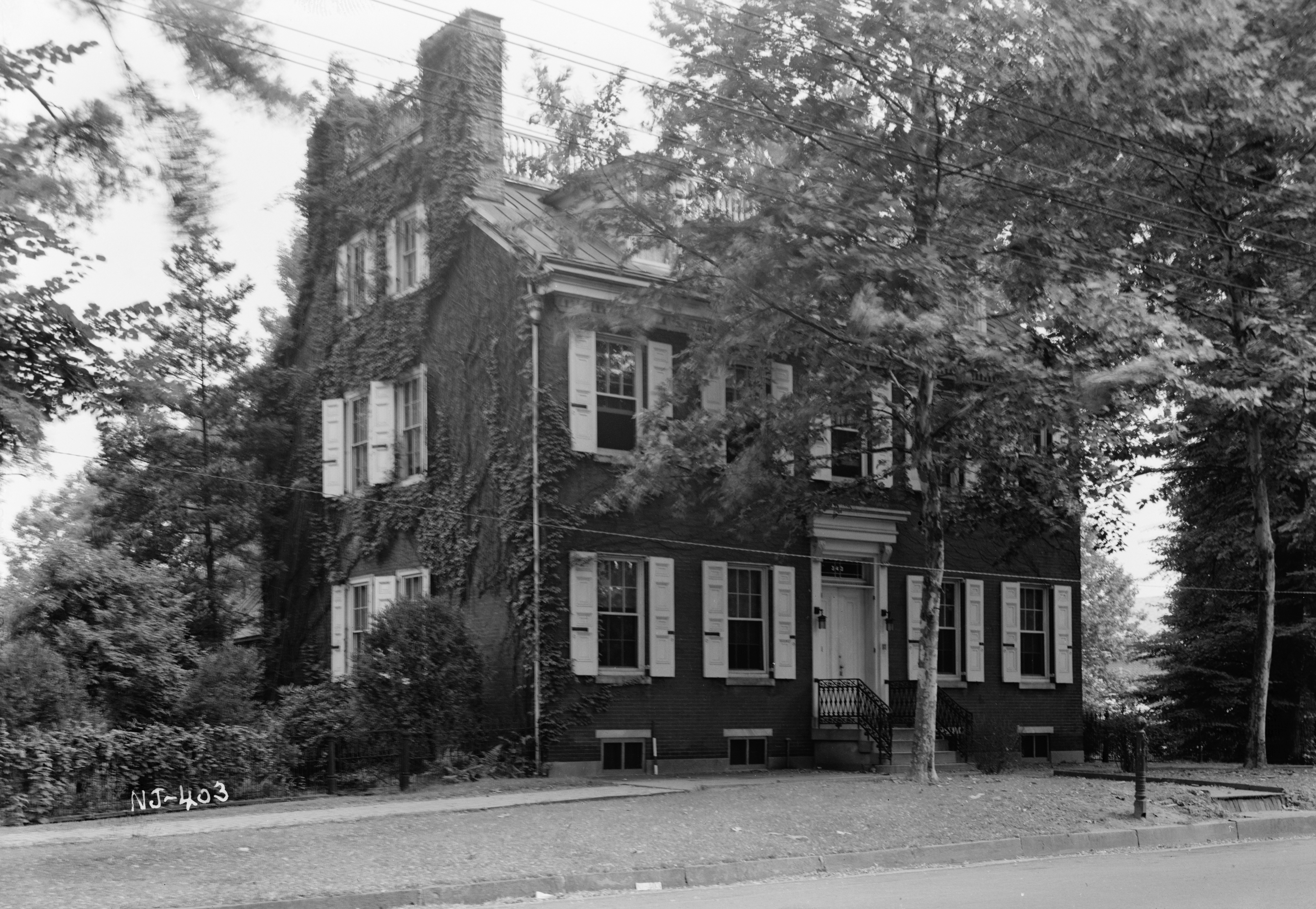
HABS photo from 1937

== The museum ==
The museum has three rooms, a parlor, dining room and bedroom, which are kept as they would have appeared in 1841. The other rooms are used to show various items from the Historical Society's large collections relating to the history of Haddonfield.

== See also ==
- National Register of Historic Places listings in Camden County, New Jersey
- List of museums in New Jersey
