= Franklin, Sacramento County, California =

Franklin
- Census-designated place
- Position in California.
- Coordinates: 38°22′03″N 121°27′42″W
- Country: United States
- State: California
- County: Sacramento

Area
  - Total: 2.106 sq mi (5.454 km^{2})
  - Land: 2.106 sq mi (5.454 km^{2})
  - Water: 0 sq mi (0 km^{2}) 0%
- Elevation: 13 ft (4.0 m)

Population (2020)
  - Total: 167
  - Density: 79.3/sq mi (30.6/km^{2})
- Time zone: UTC-8 (Pacific (PST))
  - Summer (DST): UTC-7 (PDT)
- GNIS feature ID: 2583017

Franklin is a census-designated place in Sacramento County, California, United States. Franklin sits at an elevation of 13 feet (4.0 m). The 2020 United States census reported Franklin's population at 167.

Franklin is located about 2 miles (3.2 km) west-southwest of Elk Grove. The town was named after the Franklin House that Andrew George built in 1856.

== Geography ==
According to the United States Census Bureau, the CDP covers an area of 2.1 square miles (5.4 km^{2}), all land.

== Demographics ==
Historical population
Census	Pop.	Note	%±
2010	155		—
2020	167		7.7%
U.S. Decennial Census; 1850–1870 1880-1890; 1900 1910 1920; 1930 1940 1950; 1960 1970 1980; 1990 2000 2010

Franklin first appeared as a census designated place in the 2010 U.S. census.

The 2020 United States census reported that Franklin had a population of 167. The population density was 79.3 inhabitants per square mile (30.6/km^{2}). The racial makeup of Franklin was 93 (55.7%) White, 4 (2.4%) African American, 1 (0.6%) Native American, 14 (8.4%) Asian, 1 (0.6%) Pacific Islander, 32 (19.2%) from other races, and 22 (13.2%) from two or more races. Hispanic or Latino of any race were 48 persons (28.7%).

The whole population lived in households. There were 59 households, out of which 22 (37.3%) had children under the age of 18 living in them, 30 (50.8%) were married-couple households, 7 (11.9%) were cohabiting couple households, 10 (16.9%) had a female householder with no partner present, and 12 (20.3%) had a male householder with no partner present. 8 households (13.6%) were one person, and 4 (6.8%) were one person aged 65 or older. The average household size was 2.83. There were 47 families (79.7% of all households).

The age distribution was 33 people (19.8%) under the age of 18, 26 people (15.6%) aged 18 to 24, 39 people (23.4%) aged 25 to 44, 42 people (25.1%) aged 45 to 64, and 27 people (16.2%) who were 65 years of age or older. The median age was 37.7 years. There were 85 males and 82 females.

There were 61 housing units at an average density of 29.0 units per square mile (11.2 units/km^{2}), of which 59 (96.7%) were occupied. Of these, 43 (72.9%) were owner-occupied, and 16 (27.1%) were occupied by renters.

== Franklin Cemetery ==
There is a cemetery just to the east of Franklin Elementary School, which is the final resting place of many settlers not only from Sacramento County, but from all over California. Its most famous grave is that of Alexander Hamilton Willard, who was a member of the Lewis and Clark Expedition. The grave site is California Historical Landmark #657.

== Schools ==
- Franklin Elementary School (part of the Elk Grove Unified School District)

== Notable people ==
- Birthplace of Frances Munds, granddaughter of Alexander Hamilton Willard; an American suffragette leader
