= Pauline O'Neill (suffrage leader) =

American suffragist and legislator (1865–1961)

- Born: Pauline Marie Schindler; January 13, 1865; San Francisco, California
- Died: January 12, 1961 (aged 95); Los Angeles, California
- Spouses: William Owen "Buckey" O'Neill (m. 1886; died in 1898) Eugene Brady O'Neill (m. 1901; died in 1918)

Pauline Marie O'Neill (née Schindler; January 13, 1865 – January 12, 1961) was an American suffragist and legislator. In addition to her personal accomplishments, she is remembered as the widow of William Owen "Buckey" O'Neill.

== Biography ==
O'Neill was born Pauline Marie Schindler in San Francisco, California on January 13, 1865. An only child, her parents, W.F.R. and Rosalie Young Schindler, had immigrated from Prussia and her father worked as a purchasing agent for the U.S. Army. Around 1884 her father was transferred to Fort Whipple and she accompanied her parents to Arizona Territory.

Schindler met her first husband, Buckey O'Neill, while working as a school teacher. At the time he was editor of the Hoof and Horn newspaper. The couple were married on April 27, 1886. Their first child, "Buckey" Jr., was born January 1, 1887, and died two weeks later. They adopted a second son, Maurice, on October 15 the same year. O'Neill was widowed on July 1, 1898, when Buckey died during the Battle of San Juan Hill. Life insurance of US$200,000 along with property in Phoenix and monies from her husband's onyx mine left her financially secure for many years to follow. She remarried on May 16, 1901, wedding her late husband's brother, Eugene Brady O'Neill. Eugene was a Phoenix-based lawyer who served two terms in the Council (upper house) of the Arizona Territorial Legislature before he committed suicide in 1918.

The same year she lost her first husband, O'Neill resigned her teaching position and was elected president of the Arizona Territorial Women's Suffrage Association while her friend Frances Munds was elected the group's secretary. Unlike earlier suffrage leaders in the territory, such as Josephine Brawley Hughes, O'Neill and Munds reached out to Mormon ladies within the territory. This outreach enable to organization to lobby Mormon member of the territorial legislature to support legislation supporting women, the result being passage of a women's suffrage bill by the 22nd Arizona Territorial Legislature. The bill was later vetoed by Territorial Governor Alexander Brodie.

O'Neill was quite productive in multiple women civil right's organizations following the passing of her first husband, such as being chairman of Women's Committee, member of the Council of Defense, playing a part in the Woman’s Relief Corps of the Grand Army of the Republic, and was an early member of the Prescott Women's Club.

In 1910, with the convening of Arizona's Constitutional convention, O'Neill joined other suffrage leaders in lobbying for women to be granted the vote in the new constitution. Her personal appeal was that unless they had governmental representation, women should not be taxed. Failing to achieve the desired outcome, she joined with Munds to launch a ballot initiative. O'Neill set out to establish a nonpartisan club known as the Phoenix Civic League that assisted in this ballot initiative to collects signatures. The suffrage initiative passed during the 1912 election.

O'Neill's first government position came with an appointment to the Yavapai County Board of Examiners in charge of teacher certification which she served as a member for from 1895 to 1899. This was followed in 1917 with her election to the first of two terms in the Arizona Legislature representing Maricopa County from 1915–1920. As a member of the legislature she supported a variety of children's and women's issues, including her vote for ratification of the Nineteenth Amendment to the United States Constitution.

In 1924, O'Neill moved to Los Angeles, California. She remained active in a variety of civic and charitable causes, even winning a commendation from the American Red Cross for her aid to soldiers and their families during the Second World War. She died in Hollywood, California on January 12, 1961, and was buried in Los Angeles' Calvary Cemetery.
