= Alexander Hamilton Willard =

- Born: July 1777; Condor Corner, Town of Charlestown, New Hampshire
- Died: March 6, 1865 (aged 87); Franklin, Sacramento County, California
- Occupation: Blacksmith
- Known for: Lewis and Clark Expedition
- Spouse: Eleanor McDonald

Alexander Hamilton Willard (1777–1865) was a blacksmith who joined the Lewis and Clark Expedition.

== Biography ==
=== Origin ===
Alexander Hamilton Willard Sr. was born in July 1777 in the town Charlestown, New Hampshire, he was the oldest son of Lt Jonathan Willard and the only child of Betty Caswell.

=== Expedition ===
Willard had enlisted in a U.S. Army artillery company in 1800.

During an unsuccessful search for Baker Bay as part of the Lewis and Clark expedition, Willard and George Shannon were ordered to camp out and wait for the main party. While they were sleeping on the beach, a group of Native Americans took their guns, leaving them unarmed. The main party returned in such a timely manner as to startle the Native Americans into returning the guns. Although Willard had redeemed himself by this point, he had previously received the harshest punishment distributed to a member of the Corps of Discovery; "Court Martial on the Trail". The charges were lying down and sleeping at his post while on guard duty: a military crime punishable by death. The punishment was issued on July 12, 1804, and consisted of 100 lashes divided evenly over four straight days at sunset.

During a portage around the Missouri River Falls in July 1805, Alexander Willard was attacked by a "White Bear", Clark gathered three men and chased the bear off. The island nearby later became known as White Bear Island in memory of that event.

In 1806 during his stay at Fort Clatsop, Willard fell ill and then recovered.

With the Corps of Discovery, he assisted John Shields as a blacksmith. In 1808, Meriwether Lewis hired him as government blacksmith for the Sauk and Meskwaki people; the following year, he was appointed to the same position for the Delawares and Shawnees. He later served in the War of 1812.

=== Marriage ===
Half a year after the completion of the expedition, February 14, 1807, Alexander married Eleanor McDonald. She gave birth to their twelve children. They lived for many years at Platteville, Wisconsin.

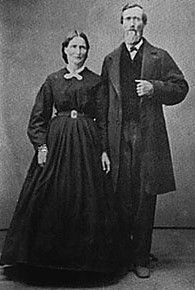
Alexander and Eleanor Willard

- Austin James Willard
- George Clark Willard
- Alexander Hamilton Willard Jr
- Eliza Martha Willard
- Roland Rudolph Willard
- Christiana D. Willard
- Joel Willard
- Nancy Adeline Willard
- Narcissa C. Willard
- Eleanor C. Willard
- Lewis Augustus Willard
- Willis Willard

=== Death ===
Alexander Hamilton Willard Sr. died in March 1865. He is buried in Franklin Cemetery in Franklin, Sacramento County, California.
