= Arizona Daily Star =

Newspaper in Tucson

- Front page
- Type: Daily newspaper
- Format: Broadsheet
- Owner: USA Today Co.
- Founder: L. C. Hughes
- Founded: March 29, 1877; 149 years ago
- Headquarters: 4061 W Costco Drive; Tucson, Arizona 85741
- Country: United States
- Circulation: 10,000 Digital Subscribers; 13,900 Average print circulation
- ISSN: 0888-546X
- OCLC number: 2949521
- Website: tucson.com

The Arizona Daily Star is an American daily newspaper based in Tucson, Arizona, and owned by USA Today Co. It serves Tucson and surrounding districts of Southern Arizona in the United States.

== History ==
=== 1877–1923 ===
On March 1, 1877, L. C. Hughes, who went on to serve as Arizona Territory governor, and Charles H. Tully published the first edition of The Daily Bulletin in Tucson, Arizona. It was published six days a week. After a month, print production was scaled back to three days a week and the paper was renamed to The Arizona Star. On June 28, 1877, the Star became a once weekly and Tully exited the business. A.E. Fay soon became co-owner and bought Hughes out that August.

Hughes returned to The Star in December 1878, first as co-publisher with Fay and a few months later as sole owner. On June 26, 1879, Hughes launched a daily edition of the paper called The Arizona Daily Star. The first edition had the wrong date at the top of the page. The Star moved its quarters from Maiden Lane to Church and Congress streets in Downtown Tucson July 28, 1881. The Daily Star and The Weekly Star were placed in the control of The Star Publishing company on Aug. 28, 1885. Hughes continued as editor and manager.

In 1907, Hughes sold The Star to William B. Kelly and his father George H. Kelly, owners of a newspaper chain called the State Consolidated Publishing Company. W.B. Kelly disposed of his interests in the business three years later to his father, who continued to published The Star, Bisbee Daily Review and Douglas International. In 1915, Hughes, who founded the Star, died at age 73.

=== 1924–1971 ===
At some point the Phelps Dodge Corporation became the majority stock owner in the business. In 1924, the company sold The Star to William R. Mathews and Ralph E. Ellinwood. Less than a year later, the paper added a Monday edition, thus printing seven days a week. In 1929, former owner G.H. Kelly died. In 1930, editor Ellinwood died. Mathews then succeeded him as editor.

On Dec. 18, 1933, The Star's building was almost totally destroyed by a fire beginning at 8 o'clock in the morning, causing a $60,000 loss. Offers of aid came from newspapers in Phoenix, Bisbee and Nogales while the blaze still burned. By 4 o'clock in the afternoon temporary headquarters established at Jackson and Stone avenue in the Old Pueblo club building, and arrangements were completed for using The Citizen's mechanical department and press. The following day, The Star issued as usual despite the fire. Pictures of the burning building were engraved and rushed by airplane from Phoenix and used in this issue—less than 24 hours after the fire. The paper carried 10 pages.

On Jan. 25, 1934, The Star moved its entire mechanical department back to the remodeled and rebuilt building that had burned. The one time in the history of the paper when it could not put out an extra, the Dillinger gang was captured in Tucson. The Star was commended by the Associated Press for "beating" all other services by over an hour in filing this national news on the Dillinger's capture. Star editor Mathews predicted the Japanese military could attack the U.S. Navy at Pearl Harbor in an editorial Nov. 28, 1941. Mathews attended the signing of Japan's surrender on Sept. 2, 1945, aboard the USS Missouri. His report ran over two weeks later.

In 1965, William A. Small Sr. and his family, owners of the Tucson Citizen, bought The Star. He and operated both paper separately. The Citizen was published daily except for Sunday, in the afternoon.

=== 1971–present ===
The Star was sold to the Pulitzer Publishing Company on April 8, 1971. The Star completed its move, along with the Tucson Citizen, which was not owned by the Pulitzer company, to a new building on South Park Avenue in August 1973. The two papers were in a joint operating agreement, in which they shared a press and building and some operations, while the newsrooms were entirely separate. The joint company was called Tucson Newspapers Inc.

On July 22, 1982, seven people were injured in three explosions at the paper's printing plant. Executive managing editor Frank E. Johnson, business manager Frank C. Delehanty, production manager Wayne Bean and chief photographer Jack Sheaffer were critically injured. A month later Delehanty died of infections resulting from his injuries.

On May 5, 1995, the Star launched its own website, azstarnet.com, which, in its early years, also functioned as an internet service provider. The website was later changed to tucson.com. It was announced on Jan. 30, 2005, that Lee Enterprises Inc. would buy the newspapers owned by Pulitzer Inc. The sale included the Star.

The Tucson Citizen, a Gannett newspaper, ceased print publication, with the last edition published on May 16, 2009. However, Gannett maintained control of the advertising and sales department shared with the Star due to a Joint Operating Agreement. Press operations for the Star moved to Phoenix on May 21, 2019. Owners of the Star sold the building at 4850 S. Park Ave. for more than $2 million at auction in September 2020. USA Today Co., formerly Gannett, acquired full ownership of the Star from Lee Enterprises in September 2026 in exchange for four Midwestern papers.

== Awards ==
In 1981, Star reporters Clark Hallas and Robert B. Lowe won the Pulitzer Prize for Local Investigative Specialized Reporting for their stories about recruiting violations by University of Arizona football coach, Tony Mason.

== Court cases ==
In 1940, the Tucson Citizen and Arizona Daily Star entered into a Joint operating agreement (JOA) that was later extended to 1990. The joint company owned equally by the two newspapers was Tucson Newspapers Inc. (TNI) The JOA helped bolster the Tucson Citizen by increasing advertising revenue since ads could now be sold by TNI for both papers.

In 1965, the U.S. government filed a complaint that the new company violated the Sherman Antitrust Act and the Clayton Act. The U.S. Supreme Court agreed, saying the First Amendment does not exempt newspapers from laws aimed at preserving competition. In response to the decision, Congress passed the Newspaper Preservation Act of 1970 to allow joint operating agreements.
