= Frances Munds =

American suffragette & senator (1866–1948)

Frances Willard Munds
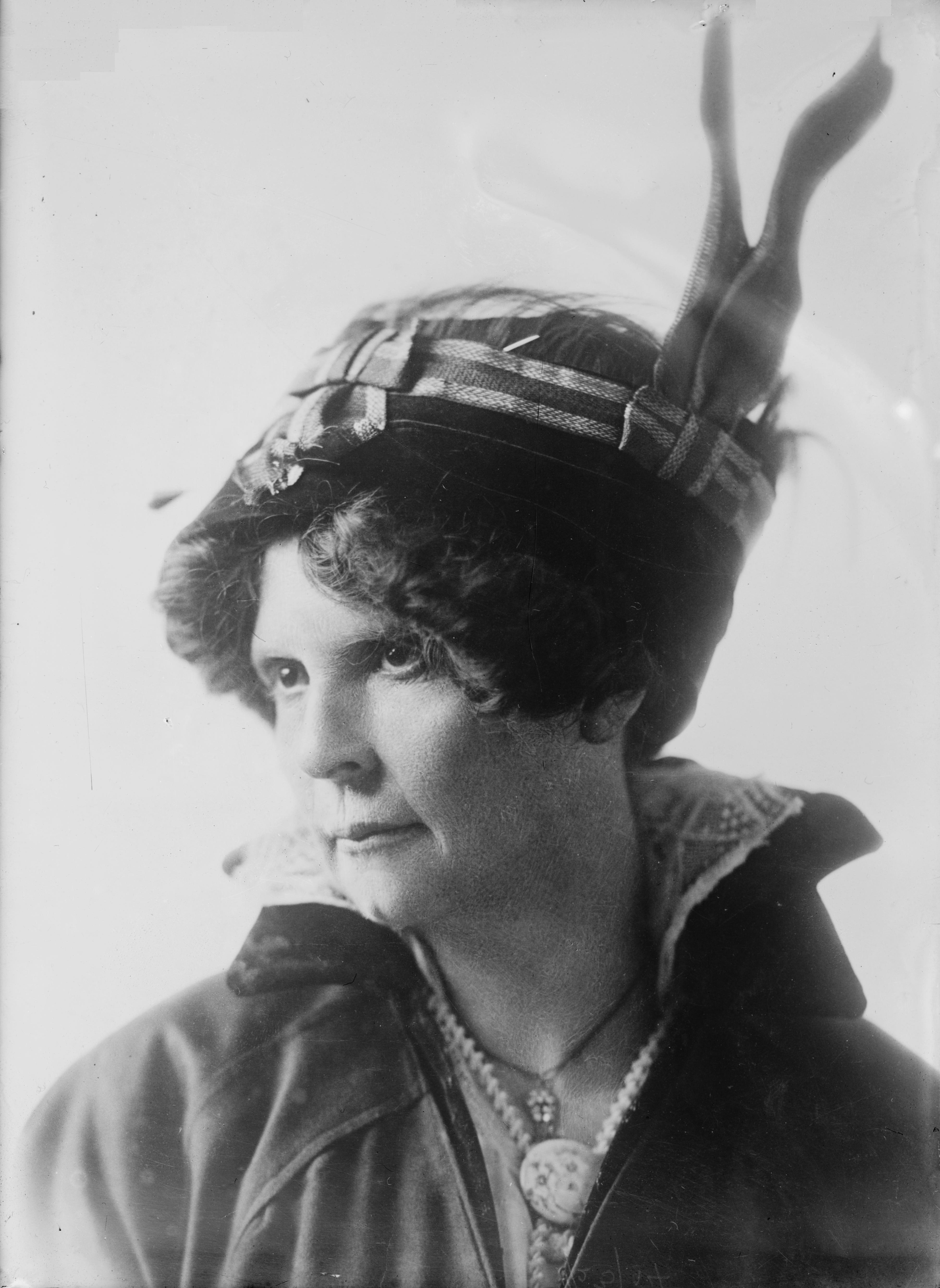

Member of the Arizona Senate from the Yavapai County district
- In office 1915–1917

Personal details
- Born: Frances Lillian Willard; June 10, 1866 Franklin, California, United States
- Died: December 16, 1948 (aged 82) Prescott, Arizona, United States
- Party: Democratic
- Spouse(s): John Lee Munds (1868-1952)
- Children: 3

Frances Lillian Willard Munds (June 10, 1866 – December 16, 1948) was an American suffragist and leader of the suffrage movement within Arizona. After achieving her goal of statewide women's suffrage, she went on to become a member of the Arizona Senate more than five years before ratification of the Nineteenth Amendment to the United States Constitution granted the vote to all American women. She lived in Prescott, Arizona and represented Yavapai County in 1915. She was a Democrat.

== Early life ==
Munds was born Frances Lillian Willard in Franklin, California, on June 10, 1866, the eighth child of Joel and Mary Grace Vinyard Willard. Mary Grace Willard was a suffragist and temperance advocate. Frances Willard's her maternal grandfather was Colonel James Russell Vineyard, a Wisconsin Territory and California politician. Her paternal grandfather was Alexander Hamilton Willard (1777–1865) who had been a member of the Lewis and Clark Expedition, and she was related to Frances Willard through that side of her family. Her family were ranchers who moved to Nevada before moving on to the Arizona Territory. In Nevada, Willard's had limited educational opportunities, but desired further education. She joined here sister and brother-in-law in Maine, and was educated at the Central Institute in Pittsfield, Maine. While there, her independence gained her the nickname "the Nevada Wild Cat." After graduating in 1885, she returned to Arizona.

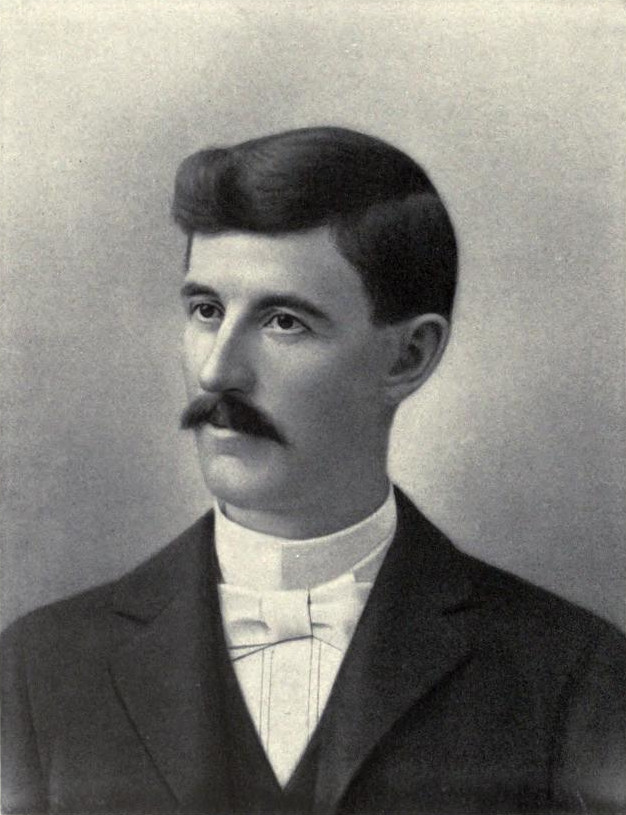
John L. Munds was a prominent cattle rancher and elected county sheriff

After graduation, Willard joined her family in the Arizona Territory, where her four brothers operated a ranch in the Verde Valley with her father's former business partner, William Munds (Joel Willard had died in 1879). She worked as a school teacher in the communities of Pine, Payson, and Mayer before marrying John Lee Munds, youngest son of Willard Munds, in 1890. She continued after marrying, finally leaving education when the school board refused to expel students who had drawn knives in her classroom.

The Munds moved to Prescott in 1893 where John Munds was elected Yavapai County sheriff for two terms beginning in 1899. Frances joined Prescott's Monday Club, where she met Pauline O'Neill (1865–1961). The couple had one son and two daughters, and developed a successful livestock business together.

== Suffrage efforts ==
In 1898, Munds was elected secretary for the Territory of Arizona Women Suffrage Organization. In 1901, she assumed the leadership of the Arizona suffrage association. Together with organization president Pauline O'Neill, she reached out to Mormon women within the territory. This marked a change from the practices of earlier suffrage leaders, such as Josephine Brawley Hughes, who had shunned the Mormon community. This outreach enabled the organization to lobby Mormon members of the territorial legislature to support legislation supporting women.

Munds also attended legislative sessions personally to lobby for women's issues. In 1903, Munds and O'Neill persuaded Arizona Democrats to tie up pending legislation until a suffrage bill passed, and the 1903 territorial legislature passed a bill granting women the vote. However, although Territorial Governor Alexander Brodie had told suffrage leaders he would not go against the legislature, he vetoed the bill. A similar bill would later be vetoed by Governor Kibbey.

In 1909, with statehood appearing imminent, Munds struck a deal with the Western Federation of Miners in which the labor union would support women's suffrage in exchange for the women's organization's support in labor issues. The next year, during Arizona's constitutional convention, a proposal granting women's suffrage was introduced. The proposed plank was defeated before it could be added to the constitution. That year, Munds was elected president of the Arizona Equal Suffrage Association.

Following Arizona's admission to the Union on February 14, 1912, a meeting of the State of Arizona Women Suffrage Organization unanimously elected Munds the organization's president. She initially refused to accept the position, but acquiesced on the condition the position be renamed chairman, and that she be allowed to reorganize the state organization. During the summer of 1912, Munds helped organize a petition drive to collect the 3,342 signatures needed for a ballot initiative. After gathering the needed signatures, Munds then proceeded to get the support of 95% of the state's labor unions. When the Progressive party came out in favor of the suffrage issue, Munds was able to force the Democratic and Republican parties to reevaluate their positions by threatening to throw support from women to the third party. When the election results were counted, the suffrage initiative had passed by a three-to-one margin in every county.

== Political career ==
In 1913, Governor George Hunt appointed Munds to represent Arizona at the International Woman Suffrage Alliance in Budapest, Hungary. The next year, she, along with Rachel Berry (1859–1948) of Apache County, became the first women elected to the Arizona Legislature (representing Yavapai County).

Upon her entry to the state legislature in 1915, Munds said, "true blue conservatives will be shocked to think of a grandmother sitting in the State Senate." During her time in office, she chaired the Committee on Education and Public Institutions, and also served on the Land Committee. Sen. Munds also introduced legislation doubling the widow's tax exemption. Another bill she worked to pass was raising the minimum age to marry to 16 for women and 18 for men, which passed in 1919. She chose not to run for a second term in the legislature, but in 1918 was persuaded to run for Secretary of State, a run which was unsuccessful.

== Death and legacy ==
After leaving office, Munds remained active in politics for the rest of her life. She died at home on December 16, 1948, and was buried at the Mountain View cemetery in Prescott, Arizona.

In 1982, she was inducted into the Arizona Women's Hall of Fame.

On May 4, 2024, a statue of Munds, created by sculptor Stephanie Hunter, was unveiled in Wesley Bolin Memorial Plaza. In the statue, Munds is holding an America flag with a ballot box at her feet.

== See also ==
- Willard House (Cottonwood, Arizona)

== Other sources ==
- Heidi Osselaer (2009) Winning Their Place: Arizona Women in Politics, 1883-1950 (University of Arizona Press) ISBN 978-0-8165-2733-5
