= Alice Locke Park =

American suffragist (1861–1961)

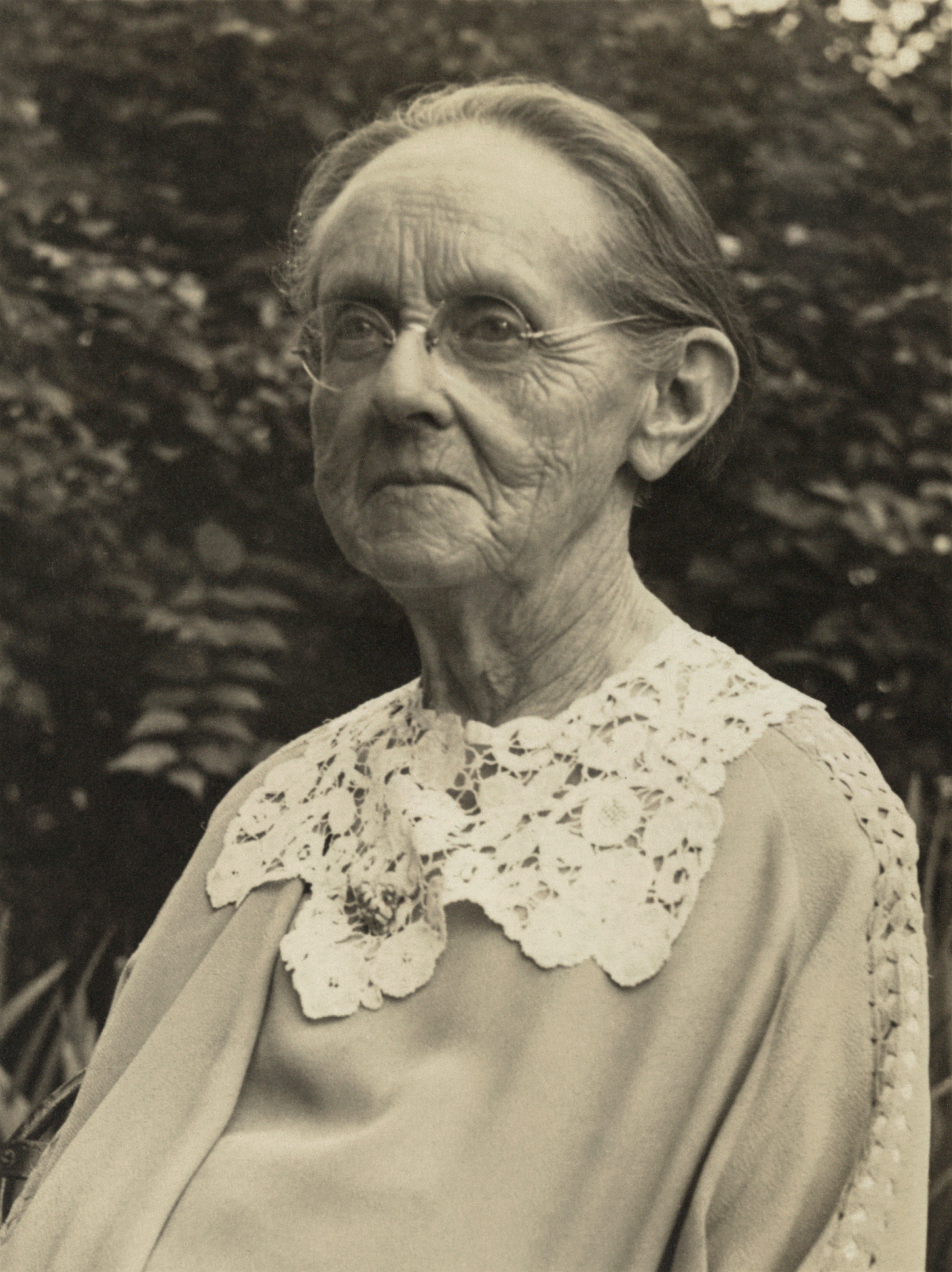
- Born: Alice Elizabeth Locke; February 2, 1861; Boston, Massachusetts, U.S.
- Died: October 17, 1961 (aged 100); Palo Alto, California, U.S.
- Spouse: Dean W. Park (m. 1884; died 1909)
- Children: 2

Alice Elizabeth Locke Park (née Locke; February 2, 1861 – October 17, 1961) was an American suffragist and a longtime defender of women's rights. She served as associate director of the Susan B. Anthony Memorial Committee of California.

== Early life ==
"I am first and last a feminist."

— Alice Locke Park

On February 2, 1861, Alice Elizabeth Locke was born in Boston, Massachusetts. In 1884, she married Dean W. Park; they had two children. Her husband died in 1909.

== Career ==
"Because war will interrupt the regular suffrage work, as war has for long done in other cases, is no reason why we should turn aside from our chosen work and take up other work."

— letter to Carrie Chapman Catt, Feb. 17, 1917

In the late 1870s, Park became interested in the suffrage movement and attended conventions in Providence, Rhode Island in 1877 and 1879. In 1894, she joined the International Feminist Movement. Park became a pacifist in 1898. She was also a socialist and a vegetarian.

She framed two pieces of California state legislation: the 1909 California Bird and Arbor Day Act legislated the protection of trees and birds and established a day for school children to be instructed in these environmental issues; and the bill which ensured equal guardianship of minor children to both parents. In the 1910s, she was State Chairman of the Literature Committee of the Political Equality League.

She was a member of the Women's Suffrage Association for 60 years. Once women's suffrage was legalized in California in 1911, she was a speaker at the Seventh Conference of the International Woman Suffrage Alliance in Budapest, Hungary, in 1913.

In 1914, she declared: "I sympathize deeply with the tactics of the militants in London. I am tired of the English women being blamed for crudeness and for their violence. To them a great deal of credit is due for getting the votes for women in California, in giving publicity to the cause. If they did not destroy property and do things out of the ordinary, no one would pay any attention to them, and their action would be a pure loss."

She quit the Unitarian society over its failure to oppose World War I. She was a Delegate to International Women's Congress for Peace and Freedom at the Hague in 1915; in 1915 she was a member of Ford Peace Ship; she was a leader of the Women's International League for Peace and Freedom (WILPF). She founded Palo Alto Women's Peace Party in 1915.

She protested Stanford University's establishment of a female quota for women and battled for women's rights. In her homes (at 611 Gilman and 510 Hamilton streets in Palo Alto) she held meetings for a pacifist group called the American Union Against Militarism. This later became the American Civil Liberties Union.

== Animal rights ==
Park was a supporter of the Humanitarian League, a British animal rights organization, and visited schools to give talks on animals. She won the praise of the organization's founder Henry S. Salt for printing a card, in 1920, that stated: "Be Kind to Animals, For You Are One Yourself."

== Death and legacy ==
Park died on October 17, 1961, at her home in Palo Alto, California. She was 100 years old.
