= L. C. Hughes =

American politician, editor and lawyer (1842–1915)

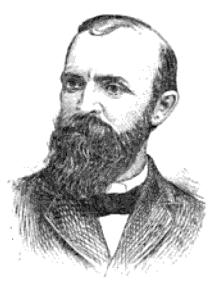

11th Governor of Arizona Territory
- In office April 12, 1893 – April 1, 1896
- Nominated by: Grover Cleveland
- Preceded by: Oakes Murphy
- Succeeded by: Benjamin Joseph Franklin

Personal details
- Born: May 15, 1842 Philadelphia, Pennsylvania, U.S.
- Died: November 24, 1915 (aged 73) Tucson, Arizona, U.S.
- Resting place: Evergreen Memorial Park, Tucson, Arizona, U.S.
- Party: Democratic
- Spouse: E. Josephine Brawley (m. 1868)
- Children: 3
- Profession: Journalist

Louis Cameron "L. C." Hughes (May 15, 1842 – November 24, 1915) was an American newspaper editor, lawyer, union organizer, and politician who served as the eleventh Governor of Arizona Territory. A Gilded Age Democrat, he was an active supporter of women's suffrage and the temperance movement.

== Background ==
Hughes was born on May 15, 1842, in Philadelphia, Pennsylvania, to Welsh immigrants Samuel and Elizabeth (Edwards) Hughes. The ninth of ten children, which included siblings Samuel, Thomas and Annie he was orphaned in 1845 and lived in an orphanage for several years. At the age of ten, Hughes was indentured to a "Calvinist farmer". At sixteen, Hughes gained his release and lived in Meadville, Pennsylvania, working his way through a local academy until the start of the American Civil War.

A strong abolitionist, Hughes attempted to enlist in the Union Army but had difficulty doing so due to generally poor health and his small stature. He did enlist with Company A, 101st Pennsylvania Volunteers for two years before health problems forced him to leave. Returning home, he enlisted in a government machine shop and, after becoming a journeyman, joined the Machinists and Blacksmiths Union #2 in Pittsburgh, Pennsylvania. Once his health recovered, he re-enlisted in the army as a sergeant with Knapp's Pittsburgh Battery stationed at Washington D.C., and served 100 days before the end of the war.

Following the war, Hughes worked as a machinist, saving money and attending Meadville Theological School and Edinboro State Normal School. For a time, he considered entering the ministry and also studied law. He remained active in union activities during this period, helping to form the Ancient Order of United Workmen. Hughes' other union efforts included gathering 7,000 signatures on a petition calling for establishment of an eight-hour day for government workers and founding a Rochdale Plan cooperative store. By 1868, his prominence had grown to the point where he was selected as a speaker for the Columbus, Ohio, meeting of the International Convention of Machinists and Blacksmiths' Union of America and Great Britain.

Hughes married E. Josephine Brawley in July 1868. Mrs. Hughes, who was called the "Mother of Arizona" by Arizona Governor George W. P. Hunt, was a women's suffragist and friend of Susan B. Anthony and Frances Willard. She was also an active member of the temperance movement. The couple had three children: Gertrude, John Titus, and Josephine Mabel.

== Arizona ==
Health concerns prompted Hughes to move to Tucson, Arizona, in late 1871. Upon his arrival he opened a law practice and was admitted to practice before the district court. In June 1872, Hughes became a member of the city council, was then appointed a probate judge, and in November 1872 was elected county attorney. He was admitted to practice before the territorial supreme court on January 17, 1873, and appointed Attorney General for the territory by Governor Safford on April 15, 1873. In August the same year, Hughes resigned following accusations that he and Judge John Titus had attempted to improperly exert influence over a mine owner. This was followed by his appointment as United States court commissioner in the late 1880s and to the Board of Managers to The Chicago World's Fair in 1891. Politically, Hughes was a delegate to the Democratic National Conventions in 1884, 1888, and 1892.

In 1877, Hughes stopped practicing law full-time and began publishing a newspaper that, following a series of name changes, became the Arizona Daily Star. As editor he supported creation of land courts to determine the validity of Spanish and Mexican land grants for land within the territory and pushed for the deportation of the indigenous Apache to Florida swamplands. Hughes consistently opposed liquor and gambling interest while championing the women's suffrage movement. He also advocated creation of savings and loan associations as a means to promote creation of new housing.

== Governor of Arizona Territory ==
He became Governor of Arizona Territory on April 14, 1893. He had liberal views. He wanted to clean up the elections process because voters were being bought with alcohol. He endorsed women's suffrage, the secret ballots, and felt most of the laws in Arizona, such as laws on houses of prostitution, furnishing liquor to minors, punishing adultery, and the following of the Sabbath law, were all being ignored. He wanted the establishment of a board of control for government agencies like the Territorial Prison and the Insane Asylum and also the establishment of a Board of Immigration to encourage business to come to Arizona. Irrigation and the booming lumber industry in Flagstaff was his major priority. He reduced the territorial debt and created a non-partisan board of control. Due to his liberal views, he created several enemies. So much so that in April of 1896, newspaper man P. J. Clark attacked the Governor by punching him in the face, in which the Governor was rushed to the doctors. As a result of the extreme hatred, he was removed from the office in 1896. He was on the Board of Regents in 1897 and eventually returned to running his newspaper, the Arizona Star. He favored joint statehood with New Mexico in 1904 and 1905. He left the Arizona Star in 1907.

== Death ==
He died on November 24, 1915, in Tucson. He is buried there in Evergreen Cemetery.

== Other sources ==
- Goff, John S. (1978). Arizona Territorial Officials Volume II: The Governors 1863–1912. Cave Creek, Arizona: Black Mountain Press. OCLC 5100411.
- Wagoner, Jay J. (1970). Arizona Territory 1863–1912: A Political history. Tucson: University of Arizona Press. ISBN 0-8165-0176-9.
- William H. Lyon (1983) Louis C. Hughes, Arizona's Editorial Gadfly (The Journal of Arizona History, Vol. 24, No. 2, pp. 171–200)
