= Laura Gregg Cannon =

American lecturer and feminist (1869–1945)

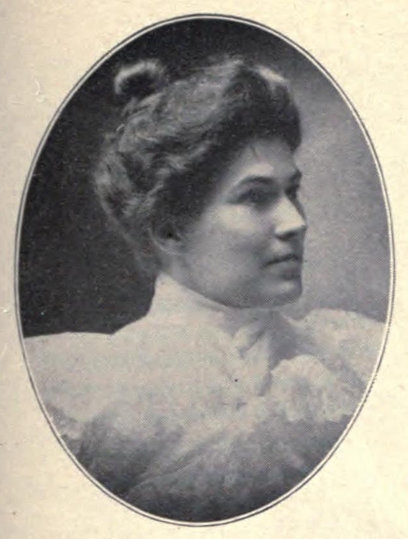
Laura Gregg Cannon

Laura Gregg Cannon (September 1869 – December 21, 1945) was an American lecturer and organizer in the women's suffrage movement. Over the course of almost three decades, she led or supported suffrage activities in fifteen different states. She was a Life Member of the National American Woman Suffrage Association (NAWSA). Cannon edited a suffrage publication and wrote on labor issues. She was a national speaker for the Socialist Party.

== Early life and education ==
Laura A. Gregg was born in Garnett, Kansas, September 1869. Her parents were Charles and Angelina Gregg (d. 1908), early settlers of Anderson County, Kansas. Cannon had two siblings, a brother, Fredrick, and a sister, Alla.

Gregg was reared in Garnett, and educated in Anderson County. When very young, she became deeply interested in the question of suffrage for women.

== Career ==
Beginning in 1895, Cannon was employed as an organizer of the NAWSA. Having paid the US$100 dues, Cannon was also a Life Member of the organization.

=== 1895-1908 ===
Gregg first promoted universal suffrage in the Oklahoma Territory in 1895. She returned again in January 1904, having been sent back by Carrie Chapman Catt, and also between March and December 1904. In 1905, Gregg continued the organizing in Oklahoma, addressing an audience of 6,000 at the Grand Army of the Republic encampment and speaking to teachers' institutes, business colleges, country school house meetings and women's clubs. She was doing field work in Oklahoma again in 1907.

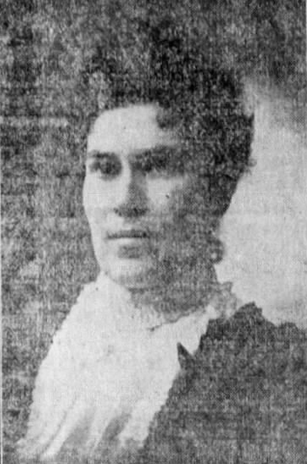
Gregg

Gregg was put in charge of the Nebraska State suffrage headquarters at Omaha, Nebraska in October 1899 by Catt. During that time, conventions and conferences were held, field was done, and the membership increased to nearly 1,200. In 1901, she edited a small printed sheet called the Headquarters Message, filled with Nebraska State suffrage news, club reports, as well as National recommendation, and sent it monthly to the workers. She also debated A. L. Bixby, editor of the State Journal in towns in eastern Nebraska. She spent the autumn of 1902 in field work throughout the state. Between October 1907 and January 1908, Gregg was back in Nebraska assisting with office and field work.

In May 1902, Catt, Gregg, and Gail Laughlin arrived in Helena, Montana, where, in conjunction with the State suffrage officers, they planned a campaign to include a meeting in every town of any importance, Gregg's responsibility being to arrange the dates from the headquarters in Helena.

In 1905, Gregg was in Oregon, supervising the work of the State organization, as well as going into large and small places, extending the work into remote corners.

In 1907, Gregg, sent by the National association, had organized suffrage committees in twelve towns of Minnesota.

=== 1909-17 ===
I believe in suffrage for these six reasons:

- A matter of single justice.
- Their lack of equal rights places the stamp of inferiority upon women in the eyes of their own children.
- All of the problems of politics are likewise problems of the home.
- "It is not good for man to be alone."
- Equal Suffrage will promote comradeship between men and women.
- Woman suffrage is in accord with the spirit of the new democracy.

-Laura Gregg Cannon, 1912

In 1909, the NAWSA sent Gregg to the Arizona Territory. she made an extensive tour of the Territory and by the time Congress had passed the Enabling Act in June, 1910, it was thoroughly organized with suffrage clubs in every county and in all of the larger towns and cities, with a membership of about 3,000 men and women. She spent that summer in Tucson, Arizona. In Arizona, she met and married Joseph D. Cannon, leader of Arizona's Western Federation of Miners. A socialist and well-known organizer, his efforts were devoted for years to the interest of labor, including the Metal Workers’ Union. In September, 1912, Cannon returned to Arizona, again campaigned the State and through her efforts, every labor organization pledged its support. In fact, on September 14, 1912, The Arizona Republic reported evidence that Cannon's mass meeting scheduled for that evening at the city hall plaza, titled "Votes for Women", would be the greatest demonstration in the history of public gatherings in Phoenix, Arizona. With workers from various parts of the state she made an address before the Arizona State Legislature, and was successful in securing what they asked.

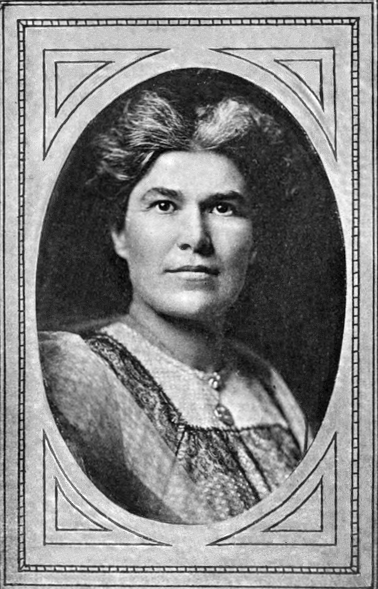
Cannon

Around 1911, Cannon removed to Los Angeles, California, where she was quite popular, and was a candidate for the board of education that year. In October 1912, characterized as "a favorite among the socialists", she spoke at the Red Men Hall in San Pedro. Still a California resident in 1914, she was sent to Nevada by the NAWSA in September of that year, to organize more thoroughly the southern counties, as success depended on an overwhelming vote from the miners and ranchers there.

She served as an organizer in Pennsylvania under Hannah J. Patterson of Pittsburgh, in 1915. In April of that year, she attended the party conference of Pennsylvania suffrage workers in Harrisburg, Pennsylvania.

Cannon was in New Jersey in 1915. Though uncomfortable with women's clubs, she worked the standard circuit for suffrage support found in middle- and upper-middle-class women's movement organizations.

In New York in November 1912, Cannon was a speaker at a meeting of the social department of the Political Equality Club. She was in the State as a fraternal delegate to the American Federation of Labor convention, sent by the NAWSA. Cannon told the audience that in Arizona, the Progressive and Socialist parties had woman suffrage planks in their platforms which proved to be of assistance in the campaign. The last documented event of her career was at a peace rally in New York City, 1917.

== Later life and legacy ==
In the 1930s, the Cannons removed to Queens, New York. Mrs. Cannon died in Queens, December 21, 1945. The Laura A. Gregg Cannon Collection is held by the Kansas Historical Society. Other correspondence is held by the Bancroft Library.
