= Laura M. Johns =

American suffragist and journalist (1849–1935)

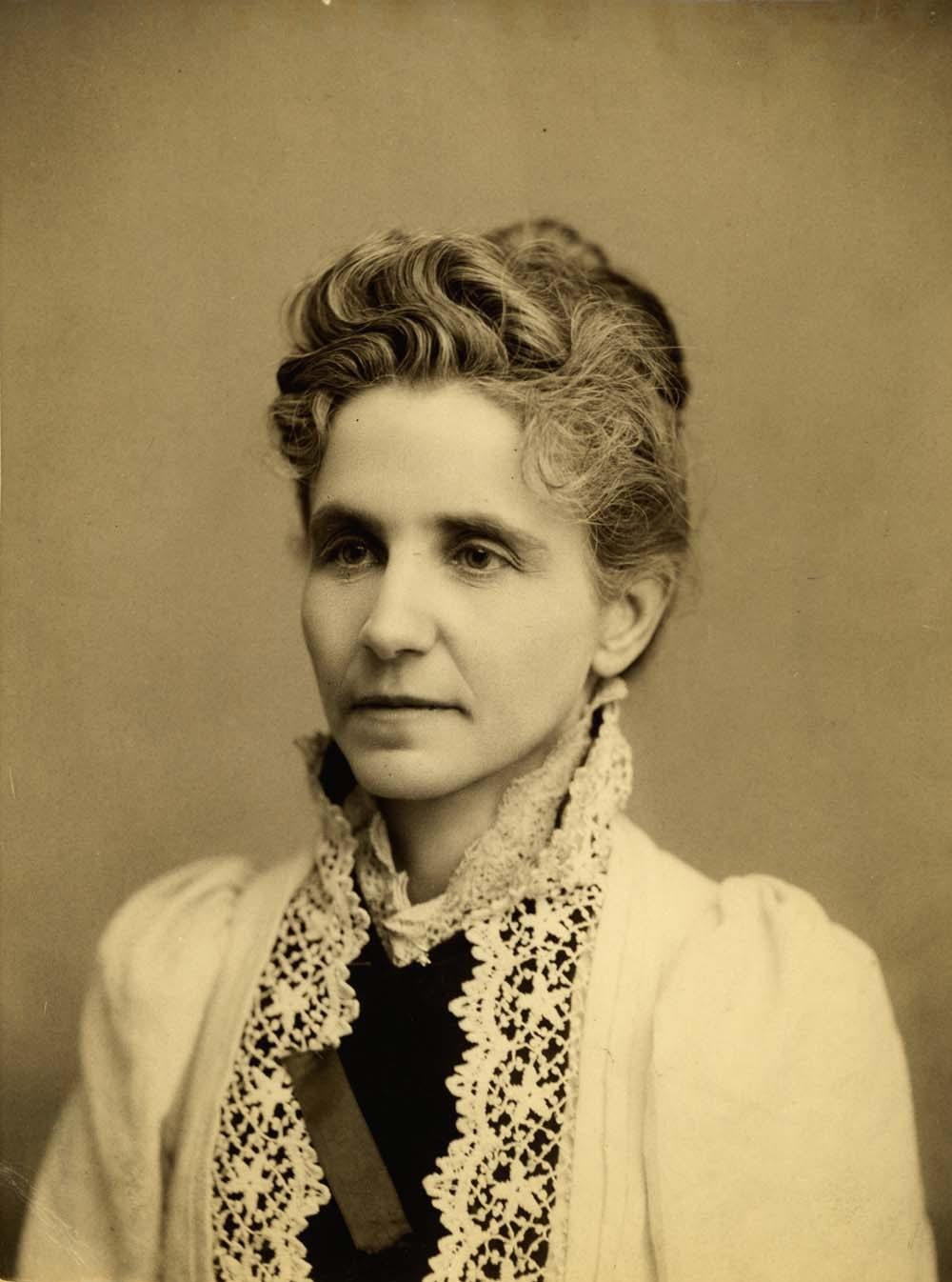
- Born: Laura Lucretia Mitchell; December 18, 1849; Lewistown, Pennsylvania, U.S.
- Died: July 22, 1935 (aged 85); Los Angeles County, California, U.S.
- Resting place: Gypsum Hill Cemetery, Salina, Kansas, U.S.
- Occupations: Suffragist, journalist
- Spouse: James B. Johns (m. 1873)
- Writing career
- Language: English

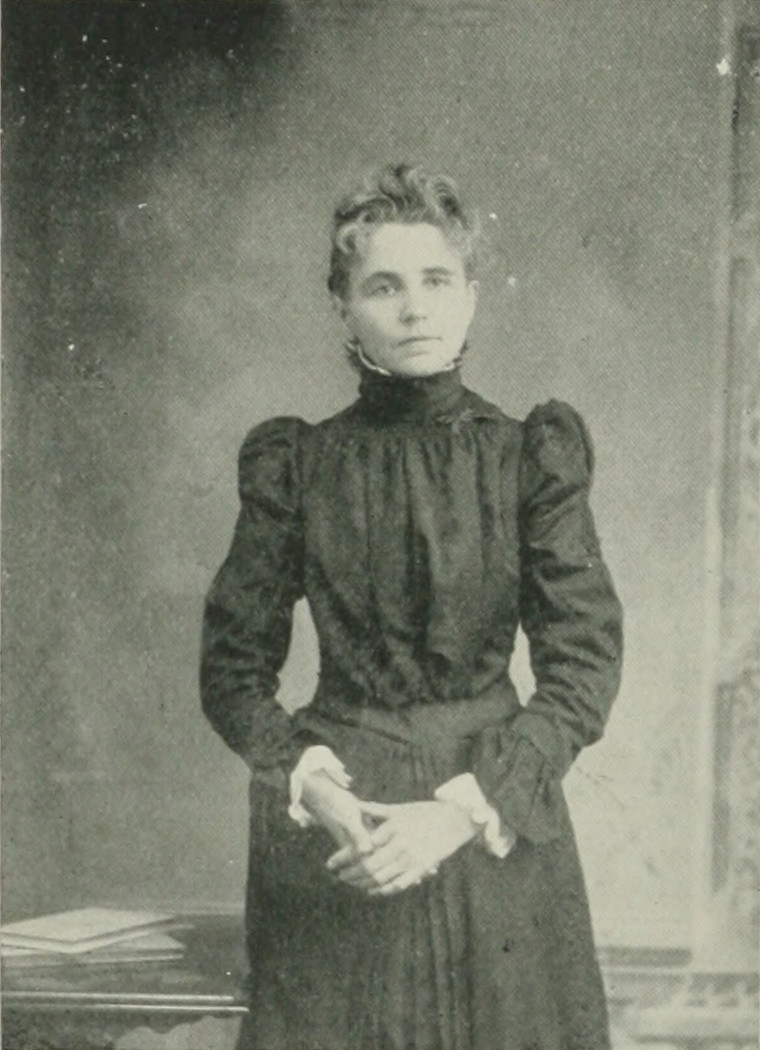
Laura Johns, a woman of the century

Laura M. Johns (née, Mitchell; December 18, 1849 – July 22, 1935) was an American suffragist and journalist. She served as president of the Kansas State Suffrage Association six times, and her great work was the arrangement of thirty conventions beginning in Kansas City in February, 1892. She also served as president of the Kansas Republican Woman's Association, superintendent of the Kansas Woman's Christian Temperance Union, and field organizer of the National American Woman Suffrage Association (NAWSA).

== Early life ==
Laura Lucretia Mitchell was born near Lewistown, Pennsylvania, December 18, 1849. Her parents were John Ross Mitchell (1820–1910) and Angeline Ayres Mitchell (1828–1900). She had two brothers, Lloyd C. Mitchell (1848–1918) and William Ross Mitchell (1851–1928). As a child she had a passion for books, was thoughtful beyond her years, and her parents encouraged in their daughter the tendencies which developed her powers to write and speak.

== Career ==
She was a teacher in Pennsylvania and in Illinois. In her marriage to James B. Johns (1844–1927), which occurred in Lewistown, January 14, 1873, she found a companion who believed in and advocated the industrial, social and political equality of women.

In 1883, Johns and her husband moved from Illinois to Salina, Kansas. Her first active advocacy of the suffrage question began in the fall of 1884. The then secretary of the Kansas Equal Suffrage Association, Bertha H. Ellsworth, of Lincoln, Kansas, while circulating petitions for municipal suffrage for women, enlisted her active cooperation in the work, which culminated in the passage of the bill granting municipal suffrage to the women of Kansas, in 1887. Johns was residing in Salina when her life-work brought her into public notice in the field in which she championed the cause of woman. A strong woman suffrage organization was formed in Salina, of which Johns was the leading spirit. Columns for the publication of suffrage matter were secured in the newspapers, and Johns took charge of those departments, becoming a writer of note. The tact and force with which she used those and all other instrumentalities to bring out, cultivate and utilize suffrage sentiment helped to gain great victories for woman suffrage in Kansas and in the nation.

With the idea of pushing the agitation and of massing the forces to secure municipal suffrage, she arranged for a long series of congressional conventions in Kansas, beginning in Leavenworth in 1886. Johns worked in the legislative sessions of 1885, 1886 and 1887 in the interest of the municipal woman suffrage bill, and there displayed the tact which later marked her work and made much of its success. In her legislative work, she had the support of her husband. After the bill became a law, her constant effort was to make it and the public sentiment created serve as a stepping-stone to full enfranchisement, and to induce other States to give a wise and just recognition to the rights of their women citizens. She spoke effectively in public on this question in Pennsylvania, Ohio, New York, Massachusetts, Missouri, Rhode Island, and the District of Columbia. She took an active part in the woman suffrage amendment campaign in South Dakota. She visited the Territory of Arizona in the interest of the recognition of woman's claim to the ballot in the proposed State constitution framed in Phoenix in September, 1891. Recognition of her services came in six elections to the presidency of the State Suffrage Association.

Her last work consisted of thirty conventions, beginning in Kansas City, Kansas in February, 1892, and held in various important cities of the State. In those conventions, she had as speakers Rev. Anna Howard Shaw, Mrs. Clara H. Hoffman, Florence Balgarnie, and Mary Seymour Howell. As workers and speakers from the ranks in Kansas there were Lucy Browne Johnston, May Belleville Brown, Mrs. Shelby-Boyd, Mrs. Denton and Elizabeth E. Hopkins. Johns was enabled to lift the financial burden, of this undertaking by the generous gift of US$1,000 from Rachel Foster Avery, of Philadelphia.

In 1894, at the NAWSA convention, Johns was appointed Chairman of the Kansas Woman Suffrage Amendment Campaign Committee, with power to name the members thereof; that committee was appointed and organized as follows: Johns, chairman; May Belleville Brown, Secretary; Elizabeth E. Hopkins, Treasurer; Alma B. Stryker, Eliza McLallin, Bina A. Ottis, S. A. Thurston, Carrie Lane Chapman, Alice Stone Blackwell, Rachel Foster Avery, Anna L. Diggs, Sallie F. Toler, L. B. Smith, Helen K. Kimber, members.

== Personal life ==
In 1911, Johns and her husband removed to California. She died July 22, 1935, Los Angeles County, California, and was buried at Gypsum Hill Cemetery, Salina, Kansas.

== Commemoration ==
A painting by Phyllis Garibay-Coon depicting Johns and other Kansas suffragists was unveiled at the Kansas Statehouse in January 2025. It is titled "Rebel Women" and is the first art installation by any woman artist to be in the Kansas Statehouse.
