= Mary C. C. Bradford =

American politician, correspondent (1856–1938)

Mary Carroll Craig Bradford
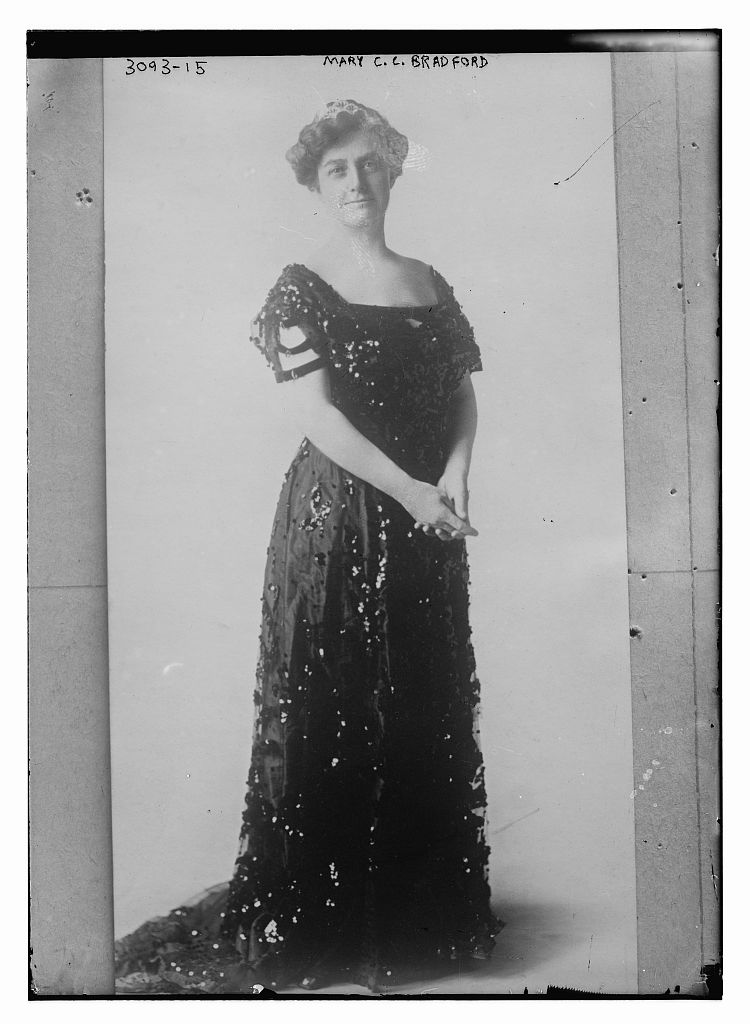
- Born: Mary Carroll Craig; August 10, 1856; New York, U.S.
- Died: January 15, 1938 (aged 81); Colorado, U.S.
- Education: Packer Collegiate Institute
- Occupation: Colorado State Superintendent of Public Instruction
- Spouse: Edward Taylor Bradford (m. 1876–1901) his death
- Parent(s): Anna Turk Carroll; James Barnes Craig

Mary Carroll Craig Bradford (August 10, 1856 – January 15, 1938) was an American educator and administrator for public education from Colorado. She was the first female delegate at the 1908 Democratic National Convention and later became the Colorado State Superintendent of Public Instruction, attaining national prominence through the work in her office.

== Early life and education ==
Mary Carroll Craig was born on August 10, 1856, in Brooklyn, New York, daughter of Anna Turk Carroll and James Barnes Craig. She was educated at the Packer Collegiate Institute in Brooklyn, with supplemental private instruction.

== Career ==
Bradford began teaching as a young married woman in Leadville, Colorado. She also taught in Colorado Springs and in Denver before moving into administrative positions, as superintendent in Adams County in 1902, and in Denver in 1908. She was elected to the Colorado state superintendency in 1913, and served six terms in that office, until 1927.

Bradford was active in the movement for women's suffrage in Colorado, as president of the Colorado Springs Equal Suffrage Association in 1893. After suffrage was won, she helped organize the Colorado Women's Democratic Club, and ran for State Superintendent of Education in 1894 (she lost to another woman, Anjanette J. Peavey).

Bradford was a charter member of the Denver Women's Club and president of the Colorado Federation of Women's Clubs. She was also president of the National Education Association.

== Personal life ==
She married Edward Taylor Bradford in 1876, and the pair had four children. She was widowed in 1901, and died in 1938, age 71.
