= Josephine Casey =

American labor leader and women's rights advocate

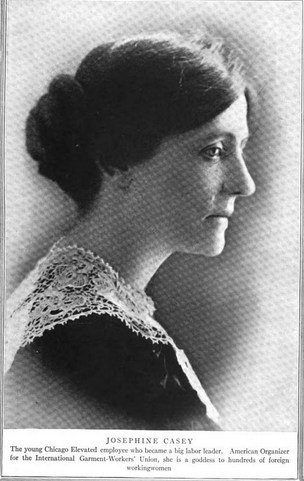
- Josephine Casey, from a 1912 publication
- Born: January 1, 1878; Memphis, Tennessee
- Died: January 27, 1950 (aged 72); New York City
- Occupation: U.S. labor union leader

Josephine Casey (1 January 1878(?) – 27 January 1950) was a labor organizer and leader, and a women's rights advocate.

== Early life ==
Casey, the youngest of four children, was born in Memphis, Tennessee in [1878?] and raised in Chicago. Her Catholic parents, Cornelius and Bridget Stephens Casey, were Irish immigrants.

== Career ==
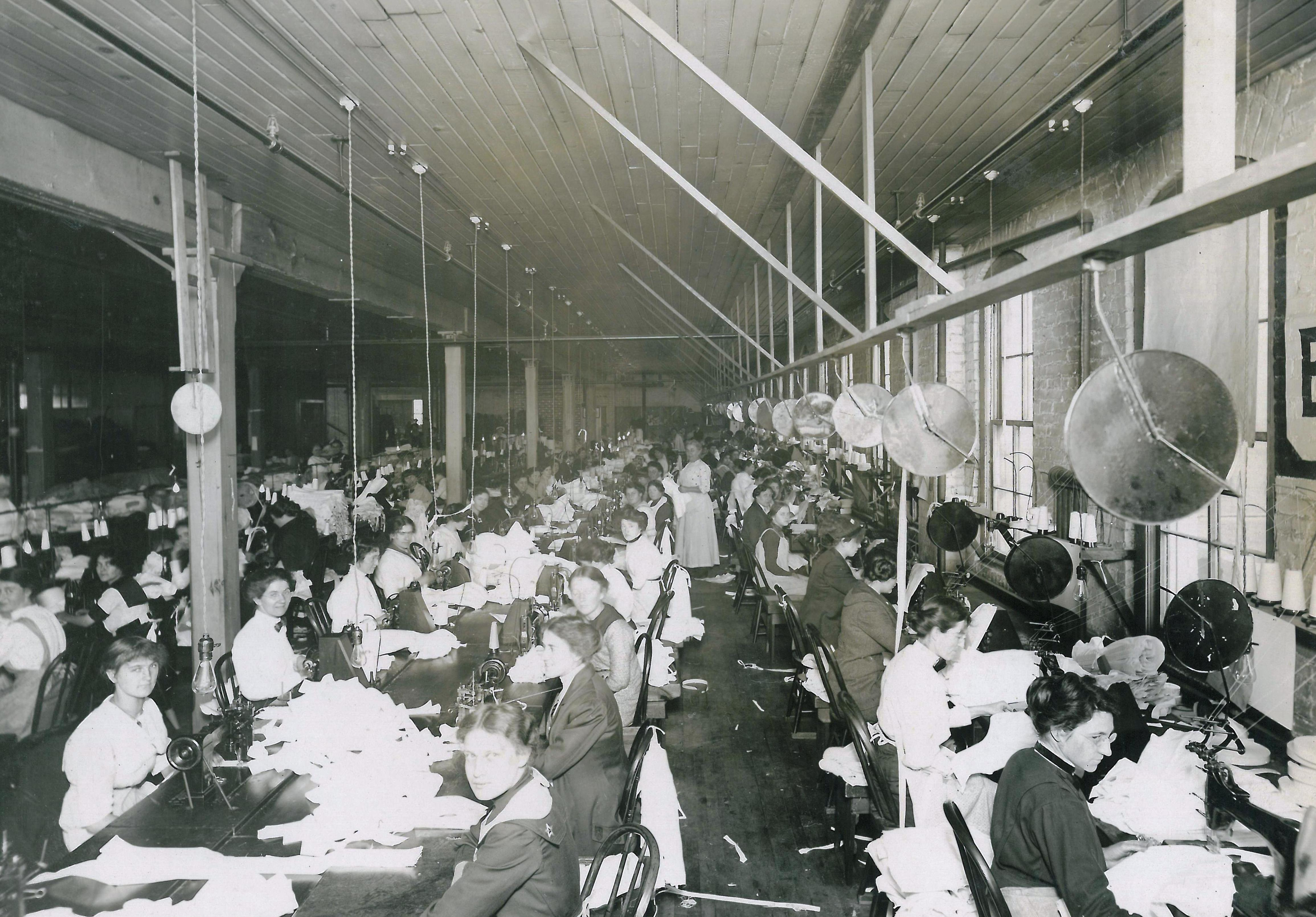
Kalamazoo Corset Company factory, 1912

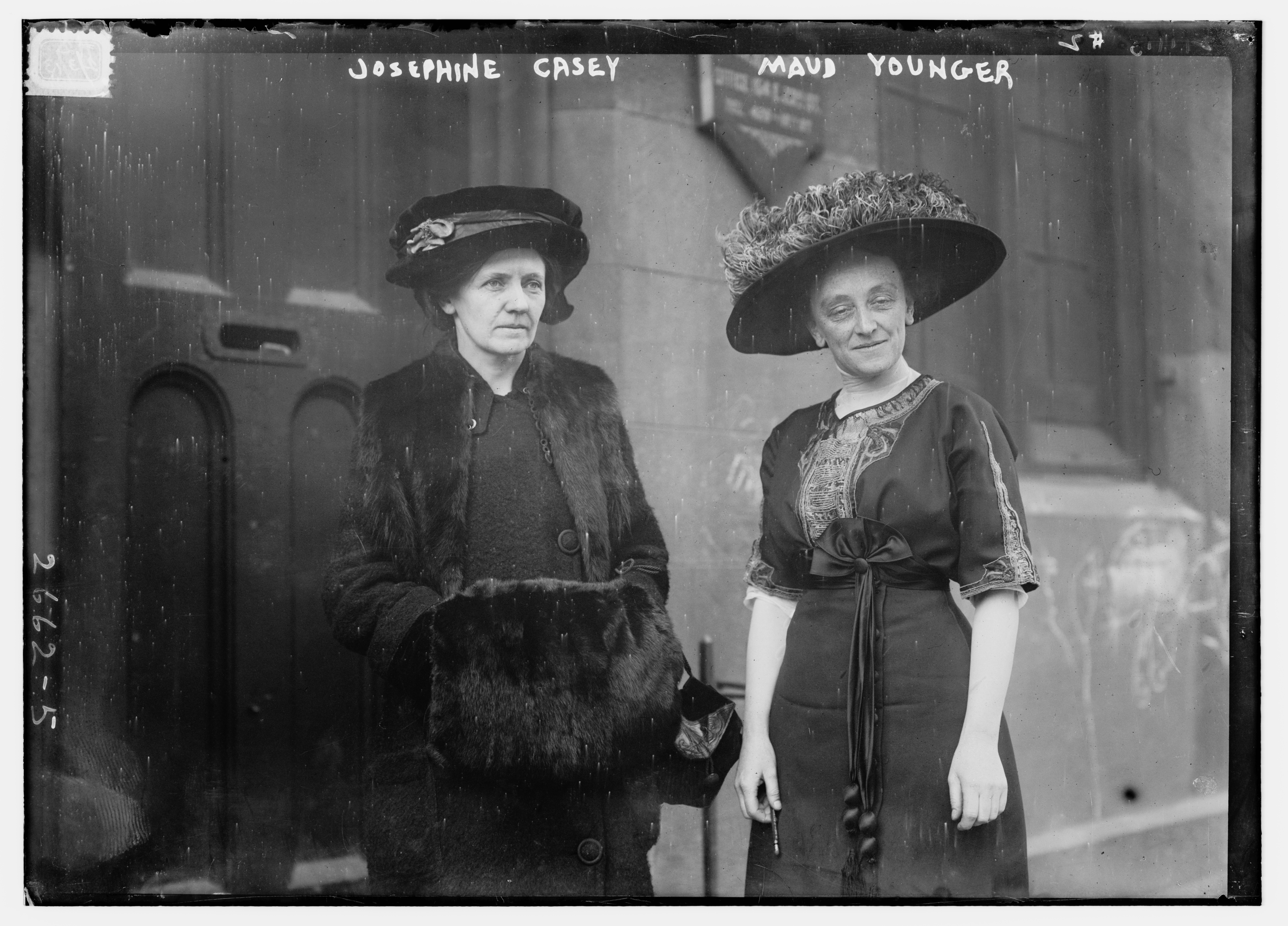
Josephine Casey and Maud Younger

While working as a Chicago streetcar ticket agent in 1904 she persuaded the women she worked with to form a union. She worked as an organizer for the Boston Women's Trade Union League from 1906 to 1909. She then organized for the International Ladies Garment Workers Union and was a strike leader for garment workers in Kalamazoo, Cleveland, and St. Louis between 1911 and 1914. In March 1912, Casey's efforts in Michigan were focused on the concerns of female workers at the Kalamazoo Corset Company including low wages, long hours in unsanitary conditions and sexual harassment from male foreman. Organizers, including Pauline Newman and Gertrude Barnum, and striking employees gained national attention for silent picketing and prayer meetings in response to a court order to stymie disorderly picket lines. An agreement that fell short of significant wage gains, but marked progress for female workers' rights, was reached on June 12.

During World War I Casey opposed women-only labor laws in the South. She was a suffrage activist and worked for the Women's Political Union in New York. In the 1920s she was a champion of the Equal Rights Amendment. Following a series of misfortunes, she was earning $5 per week working as a housekeeper. In 1931 the National Woman's Party (NWP) contacted her and sent her to Atlanta to oppose the efforts by the Southern Council and the Cotton Textile Institute to establish sex-based legislation. Her reports were made into a regular column featured in the NWP's weekly bulletin Equal Rights.

== Death ==
As a member of the First Church of Christ, Scientist in Boston and later the Seventh Church of Christ Scientist in New York, Casey refused to seek medical care for heart related issues because of her religious beliefs. She died at her home in New York City on January 27, 1950.
