= Alexander Oswald Brodie =

American military officer and politician (1849–1918)

Alexander Brodie
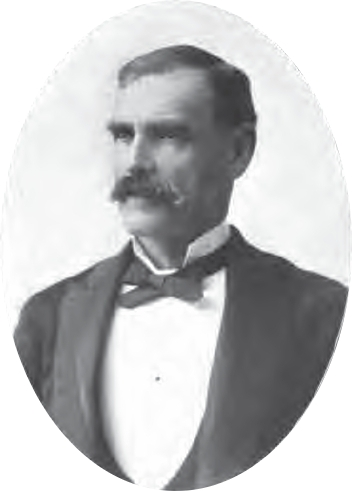

15th Governor of Arizona Territory
- In office July 1, 1902 – February 14, 1905
- Nominated by: Theodore Roosevelt
- Preceded by: Oakes Murphy
- Succeeded by: Joseph Henry Kibbey

Personal details
- Born: November 13, 1849 Edwards, New York, U.S.
- Died: May 10, 1918 (aged 68) Haddonfield, New Jersey, U.S.
- Party: Republican
- Spouses: Kate Reynolds (m. 1877) Mary Louise Hanlon (m. 1864–1918)

Military service
- Branch/service: United States Army
- Years of service: 1870–1877, 1883–1884, 1898, 1905–1913
- Rank: Colonel
- Unit: Rough Riders
- Battles/wars: American Indian Wars; Apache Wars; Nez Perce War; Spanish–American War; Battle of Las Guasimas (WIA)

Alexander Oswald Brodie (November 13, 1849 (Note: The date of Brodie's birth is uncertain with multiple dates in October and November 1849 being possible.) – May 10, 1918) was an American military officer and engineer. Earning his initial reputation during the Indian wars, he came to prominence for his service with the Rough Riders during the Spanish–American War. His friendship with Theodore Roosevelt then led to Brodie being appointed Governor of Arizona Territory from 1902 to 1905.

== Background ==
Alexander O. Brodie was a lineal descendant of Robert III, King of Scotland. His family originated in Northern Scotland and his branch of the Clan Brodie is known as Brodie of Caithness. Brodie was born to Joseph and Margaret (Brown) Brodie near Edwards, New York, in late 1849, the second of four children. At the outbreak of the Civil War, Brodie was 11 years old and asked his father to allow him to enlist. Brodie's father promised him that he would be sent to West Point when he was old enough. By age 13 he was a student in a boarding school in Canton, New York operated by St. Lawrence University. Brodie received an appointment to the United States Military Academy in 1866 and upon graduation was commissioned a Second Lieutenant in the 1st Cavalry Regiment (United States) on June 15, 1870.

As a newly commissioned officer, Brodie was assigned to Camp Apache, where he participated in General George Crook's campaign in Arizona Territory. During this assignment there were several events of note. On June 21, 1871, Brodie and a group of five troopers were ambushed by a numerically superior band of Apache fighters. The young lieutenant managed his group's ammunition supply over the course of an eight-hour fight, and returned safely to camp after nightfall. As result of his efforts that day, Brodie received a personal commendation from the Secretary of War. During another incident he and one other soldier pursued and captured a band of Apache that had escaped from the San Carlos Apache Indian Reservation. After finding the group, the band's leader threatened to kill Brodie. Brodie responding by shooting the chief. After seeing this exchange the rest of the band returned peacefully to the reservation. In August 1874, he was assigned to Fort Walla Walla, Washington where he participated in the campaign against Chief Joseph and his band of Nez Perce. Following this, Brodie served at Benicia Arsenal, California and Fort Colville, Washington before being promoted to first lieutenant on May 25, 1876. Around the time of his promotion, Brodie married Kate Reynolds of Walla Walla, Washington. His wife and newborn daughter died during childbirth in August or September 1877, and Brodie resigned his commission on September 30, 1877.

After leaving the military, Brodie worked as a cattleman in Kansas and miner in Dakota Territory before enlisting in the U.S. Cavalry at Jefferson Barracks, Missouri in August 1883. His enlistment returned him to Arizona Territory, where he was discharged in February 1884. Remaining in the territory, Brodie established a permanent residence in Prescott while working around the territory as a civil and mining engineer. From 1887 till 1890 he worked as superintendent and chief engineer of the Walnut Grove Dam on the Hassayampa River north of Wickenburg. As the dam was nearing completion, in February 1890, a flood caused the dam to collapse, causing 70 deaths and millions of dollars in damage. Brodie himself was held innocent of wrongdoing in the failure as he had publicly called for higher construction standards on the project. In 1891, Brodie was appointed commander of the Arizona Territorial National Guard by Governor John N. Irwin, a position he held till May 1892.

On December 15, 1892, Brodie married Mary Louise Hanlon. The second Mrs. Brodie was a survivor of the Walnut Grove Dam failure. A distant uncle, Henry Spingler van Beuren was the president of the company that built the dam. The couple had two sons, with the first dying in 1896 and the second being born in 1898. Politically, Brodie served as Yavapai County recorder from 1893 till 1895. and was the Republican nominee for Territorial delegate in 1898, when he returned to the territory as a war hero.

== Spanish–American War ==
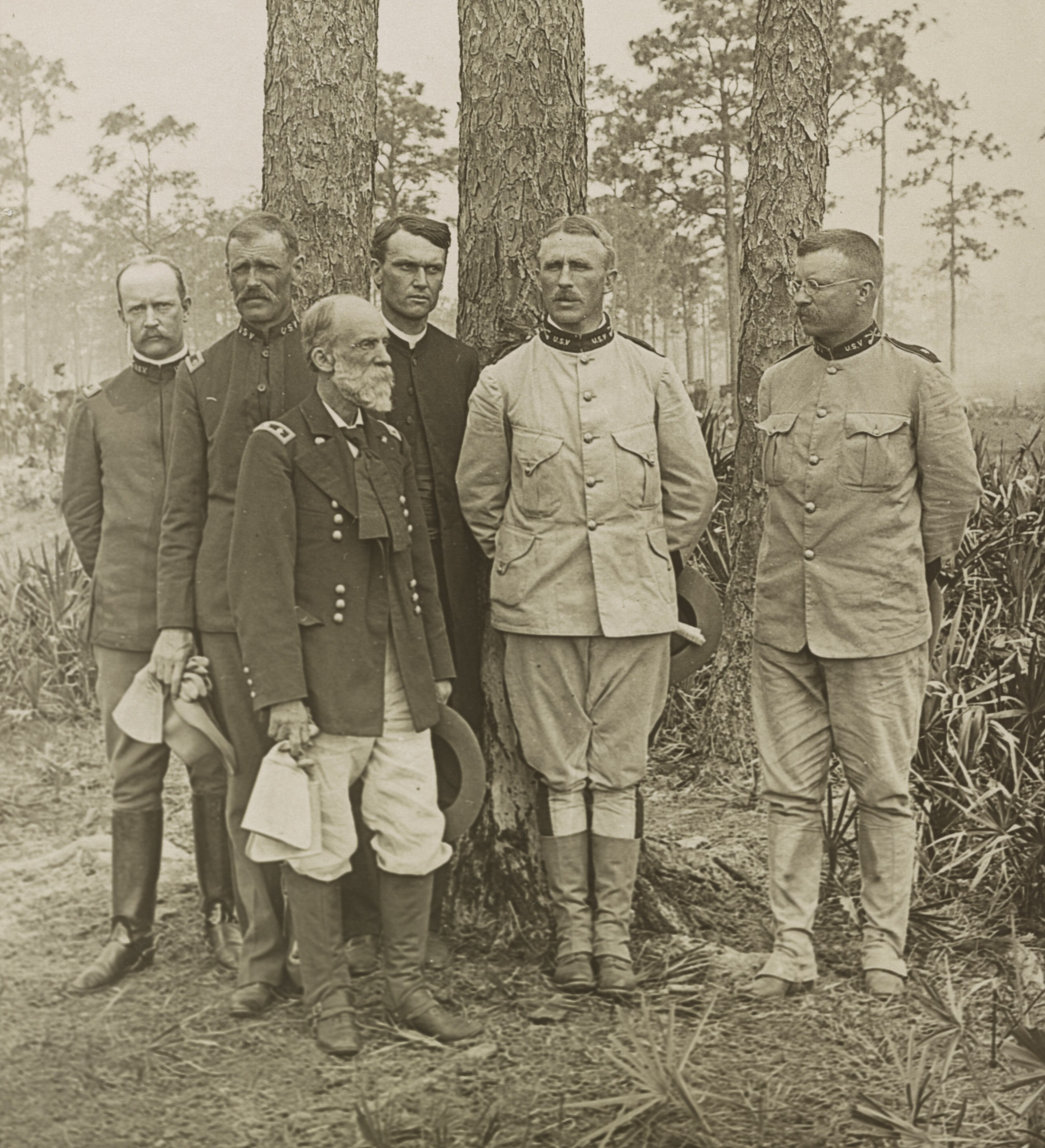
Staff of the 1st US Volunteer Cavalry Regiment, the Rough Riders: From Left to right, Maj. George Dunn, Major Brodie, former Confederate Gen. Joseph Wheeler, Chaplain Brown of the Rough Riders, Col. Leonard Wood, and Lt. Col. Theodore Roosevelt.

On March 3, 1898, with the outbreak of war between Spain and the United States appearing likely, Brodie sent telegraphs to President William McKinley and Governor Myron H. McCord seeking permission to raise a volunteer regiment of cavalry. With the start of the Spanish–American War the Rough Riders were formed and Arizona Territory allocated a quota of 170 men. Brodie was appointed as senior regimental officer at the rank of major on April 25, 1898.

Following training in San Antonio, Texas, Brodie's unit was deployed to Cuba. On June 24, 1898, during the Battle of Las Guasimas, he was wounded by a bullet in his right wrist. Initially refusing to leave the battle, Major Brodie was eventually forced from the field by pain and blood loss. He was evacuated from Cuba and treated in the hospital at Fort Wadsworth, New York. After recovering from his wound, Brodie returned to the Rough Riders on August 11, 1898, and, being promoted to lieutenant colonel, succeeded Theodore Roosevelt as unit commander. Brodie himself mustered out on September 15, 1898, and returned to Arizona Territory to work as a mining engineer.

== Governorship ==
Following the resignation of Oakes Murphy as Governor of Arizona Territory, Brodie was nominated for the position and sworn into office on July 1, 1902. His first several months were spent appointing new officials and organizing his administration. An action of note prior to the convening of the 22nd Arizona Territorial Legislature was the pardon of Pearl Hart on moral grounds. At the time, the outlaw was the only female at the Yuma Territorial Prison and her presence was causing disruptions as guards and other prisoners vied for her attentions. The December 1902 pardon was made on the condition that Hart leave the territory, a condition she quickly fulfilled. Another display of the new Governor's ethical stance was his refusal to use a US$750 discretionary fund which was available for his personal use. Brodie considered the legislative appropriation which created the fund illegal as it had no oversight provisions to prevent misuse.

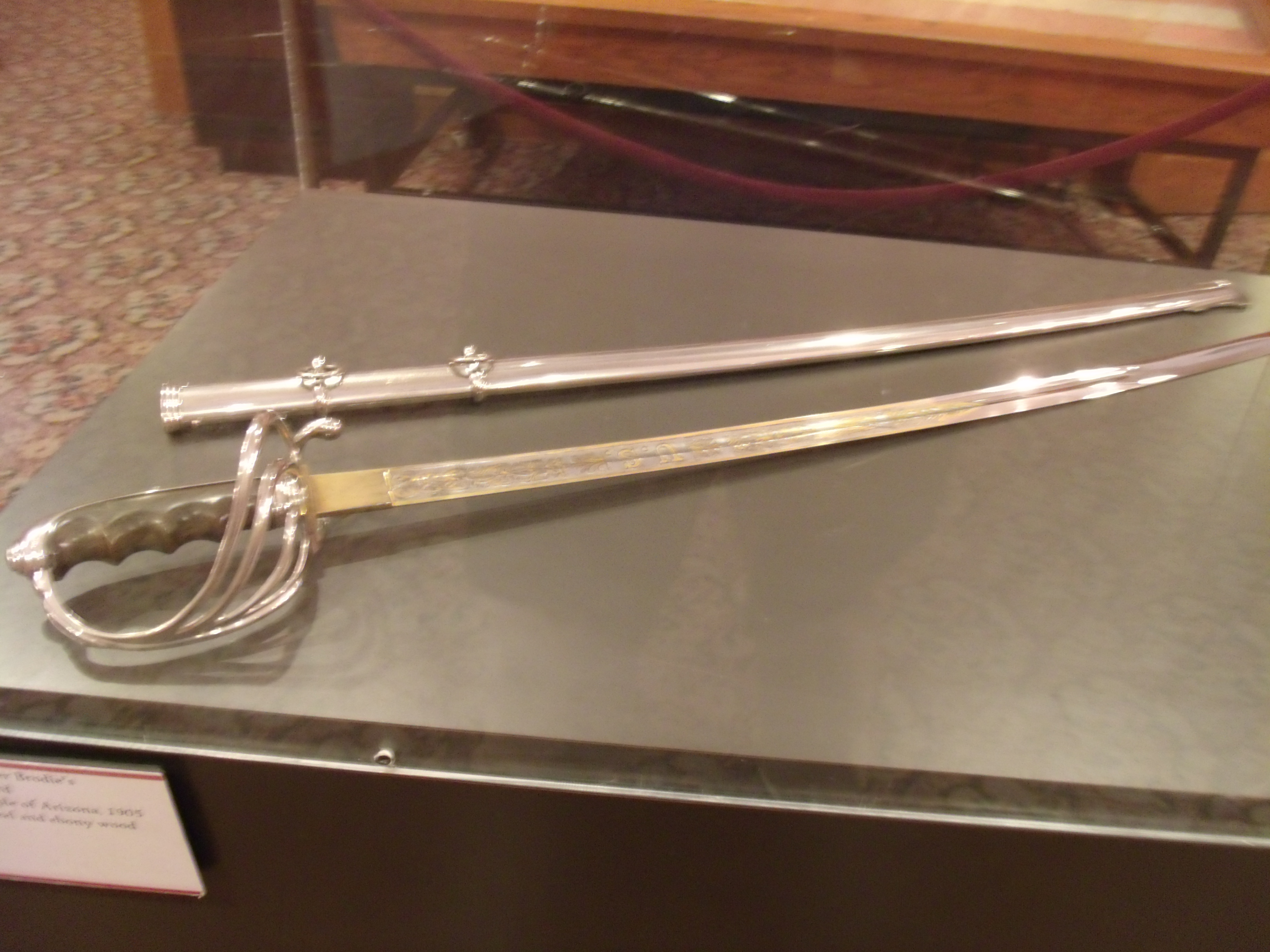
Ceremonial saber presented to Alexander Brodie in 1905. The saber and scabbard are part of the Arizona Capitol Museum collection and are not currently on exhibit.

With the start of the 22nd Legislature in January 1903, Brodie requested several changes to the territorial tax code. The first change he asked for was increasing the tax rates for mining operations which the Governor felt were not paying a fair share in comparison to other parts of the territorial economy. He also proposed an exemption from taxation of 10 years for new railroads and 9 years for hydroelectric dams to encourage additional transportation and electrical generation capabilities within the territory. Other changes to mining operations were the establishment of an eight-hour day for mine workers, with railroad workers receiving a limit of 16 consecutive hours of work, and outlawing the practice of paying miners in company scrip redeemable only at the company store. Brodie also requested the pay for the governor's secretary be increased from US$125 to US$150/year. Other legislation coming from the session were laws requiring the licensing of dentists and physicians, requiring schools to fly the United States flag during hours the school was in session, expanding the facilities of the territorial insane asylum, and authorizing school districts with 1,000 or more residents to hire music and art instructors. Brodie also took unpopular stances on two of the session's bills. The first stance was opposition to a bill granting women the right to vote. Brodie, who personally supported women's suffrage, opposed this bill on the basis that it was not permitted under the limitations of the Arizona Organic Act. The second unpopular stance was endorsing a bill supporting joint statehood with New Mexico.

Between legislative sessions, Brodie was responsible for expanding the size of the Arizona Rangers from fourteen to twenty-six men. This was followed by him selecting the site for Roosevelt Dam. At the beginning of the 1905 legislative session, the Governor announced the results of a two-year study on possible joint statehood with New Mexico, finding the residents of Arizona strongly opposed such an action, and appealed to the legislature to oppose such a merger. After hearing the appeal the legislature memorandized the U.S. Congress expressing their opposition to joint statehood. Brodie's address to the session repeated his request to the previous session for tax reform. He also requested laws to deal with the "growing evil of wife desertion" and for creation of a sanatorium to treat the growing numbers of people suffering from tuberculosis migrating to the territory.

Brodie announced his resignation as governor on February 14, 1905. As a token of their esteem the Democratically controlled legislature presented the Republican governor a ceremonial saber.

== After office ==
Following his resignation as governor, Brodie returned to the U.S. Army at the rank of major. After serving briefly in the War Department's record and pension office, he was assigned to the Philippines serving on a board overseeing the Friar lands dispute. In 1907 he was made adjutant general of the Department of the Dakotas and in 1911 was transferred to the Department of California to perform the same job. Brodie was promoted to colonel in 1912 and retired from the military in 1913.

Brodie moved to Haddonfield, New Jersey, where he settled at Greenfield Hall. Brodie died on May 10, 1918, and was buried in Arlington National Cemetery.

== Footnotes ==
Political offices
Preceded by Oakes Murphy	Territorial Governor of Arizona; 1902–1905	Succeeded by Joseph Henry Kibbey
