= Alice M. Birdsall =

American lawyer (1880–1958)

- Born: July 27, 1880; Waterloo, Iowa
- Died: 1958
- Education: Washington College of Law
- Known for: Lawyer and women's rights advocate

Alice M. Birdsall (July 27, 1880-November 1958) was Arizona's second female attorney, an expert in bankruptcy law, and a female rights advocate.

== Biography ==
Alice Mabeth Birdsall was born on July 27, 1880, to George B. and Anna Birdsall in Waterloo, Iowa. Birdsall was a talented student and graduated from the Waterloo high school in 1895. She then studied at the Iowa State Normal School and worked as a legal clerk in her brother's law office, where she was inspired to become a lawyer upon reading Simon Greenleaf's Treatise on the Law of Evidence. In 1902, Birdsall moved to Whittier, California, where she was a law clerk and stenographer for the California State Legislature. Birdsall continued to work as a stenographer upon moving to Globe, Arizona and El Paso, Texas.

In 1912, Birdsall moved to Washington, D.C. to attend the Washington College of Law. She successfully petitioned that she be able to complete her coursework in one year, citing her extensive legal clerk experience. Despite working during the day and attending class at night, Birdsall graduated with the highest marks since the college had opened in 1896.

=== Legal work ===
After graduating, Birdsall returned to Globe, where she joined Sarah Herring Sorin in her legal practice. Sorin, the first female lawyer in the state, became a mentor to Birdsall, now the second.

When Sorin died in 1914, Birdsall moved to Phoenix, Arizona, and began a solo law practice. As the only female lawyer in Maricopa County, Birdsall experienced prejudice from her male colleagues. However, she quickly became accepted by the Maricopa County legal community and was invited to speak at the Arizona State Bar Association banquet in 1916.

During her career, Birdsall became an expert in bankruptcy law and joined the Arizona Bar Association's bankruptcy committee in 1936. From 1915 to 1936, Birdsall additionally served as the reporter of decisions for the Arizona Supreme Court.

=== Work with civic and women's organizations ===
Birdsall was also active in civic and women's organizations and used her legal experience to draft bylaws and legislation for women's organizations.

In 1912, the Arizona Federation of Women's Clubs asked Birdsall to help them in their endeavor to legitimize illegitimate children. Birdsall drafted a bill that was sponsored by C. Louise Boehringer in 1921 and signed into law.

Birdsall was an active feminist and suffragist. In 1915, she led an automobile parade to lobby Carl Hayden to support the suffrage amendment. Birdsall also served as the Arizona vice president for the Association of Women Lawyers. She was a leading advocate in the Arizona Federation of Business and Professional Women's Club's lobbying effort to give women the right to sit on juries. She also was an advocate for the Equal Rights Amendment.

From 1915 to 1917, she served as the Arizona chair of the Women's Liberty Loan Committee, raising millions of dollars to support World War I.

Birdsall was an active Democrat and was appointed as an Arizona delegate to the 1920 Democratic National Convention.

== Death and legacy ==
Birdsall retired in July 1958 and died three months later.

In 2010, Birdsall was inducted into the Arizona Women's Hall of Fame.
