= Mary Bernard =

Mary Bernard may refer to:

- Mary Bernard Aguirre (1844–1906), American educator
- Mary Bernard Dickson (c. 1811 – 1895), New Zealand nun, nurse, and teacher
- Mary Bernard Kirwan (1797–1857), Irish-born Canadian nun and educator
- Mary Bernard Laughlin (1876–1948), American Roman Catholic nun and educator
- Mary Gaines Bernard (fl. from late 1960s), American singer
