= Moore & Bryant v. The Globe-Miami, Arizona School Boards =

U.S. law case

- Court: Gila County Superior Court
- Decided: 1952

Case history
- Appealed to: Yavapai County Superior Court

Court membership
- Judge sitting: Clifford Clinton Faires

Moore & Bryant v. The Globe-Miami, Arizona School Boards was an Arizona lawsuit in which two African American teachers were found to have been wrongfully dismissed upon the racial integration of their districts' schools in 1951. This case, a precursor to Brown v. Board of Education, allowed educators of color to teach in Arizona's integrated schools.

== Background ==
Arizona codified the segregation of schools into law in 1909. The Globe-Miami School District had two small African American schools, Dunbar School in Globe, Arizona and Thomas Jefferson School in Miami, Arizona. The staff of the schools included African American teachers Daisy Moore (December 7, 1910- August 8, 1985) and Marietta Bryant (June 28, 1911- October 14, 2004), who had attended Oklahoma Colored Agricultural and Normal University together before they moved to Arizona to teach in 1946. By 1951, they were both tenured.

In 1951, the Arizona Legislature passed House Bill 86, allowing (though not mandating) desegregation. Three days before Governor Howard Pyle signed the statute into law, Moore and Bryant were told that their contracts would not be renewed. The schools did not want African American teachers teaching white students. While Arizona's Tenure law protected them from being unfairly dismissed, it allowed school boards or superintendents to dismiss teachers if they had a "good and just cause," which the schools were now claiming.

== Legal case ==
Moore and Bryant's initial requests for hearings with their school boards were denied. They then went to the Arizona Education Association, which hired Bob McGhee to represent them. The school boards defended their decision by claiming that firing the teachers was a logical way to save money. However, during court testimony, it was revealed that they anticipated racial clashes.

Judge Clifford Faires granted summary judgment in Moore and Bryant's favor, declaring their termination was due to racial discrimination, and so was unconstitutional. The school board tried to appeal the case, but their financial argument was disproven as the Globe School Board had hired twelve new teachers. Judge W. E. Patterson of Yavapai County agreed with Judge Faires's ruling. The teachers were provided with a year's lost wages and reinstated.

== Aftermath ==
Following the case, the NAACP praised the decision. Moore taught third and fourth grade at Noftsger Hill School until she retired in 1975, and Bryant taught penmanship at Bullion Plaza School until 1961, when she moved.

In 2015, Moore and Bryant were inducted into the Arizona Women's Hall of Fame in honor of their efforts.
