= Arizona Women's Hall of Fame =

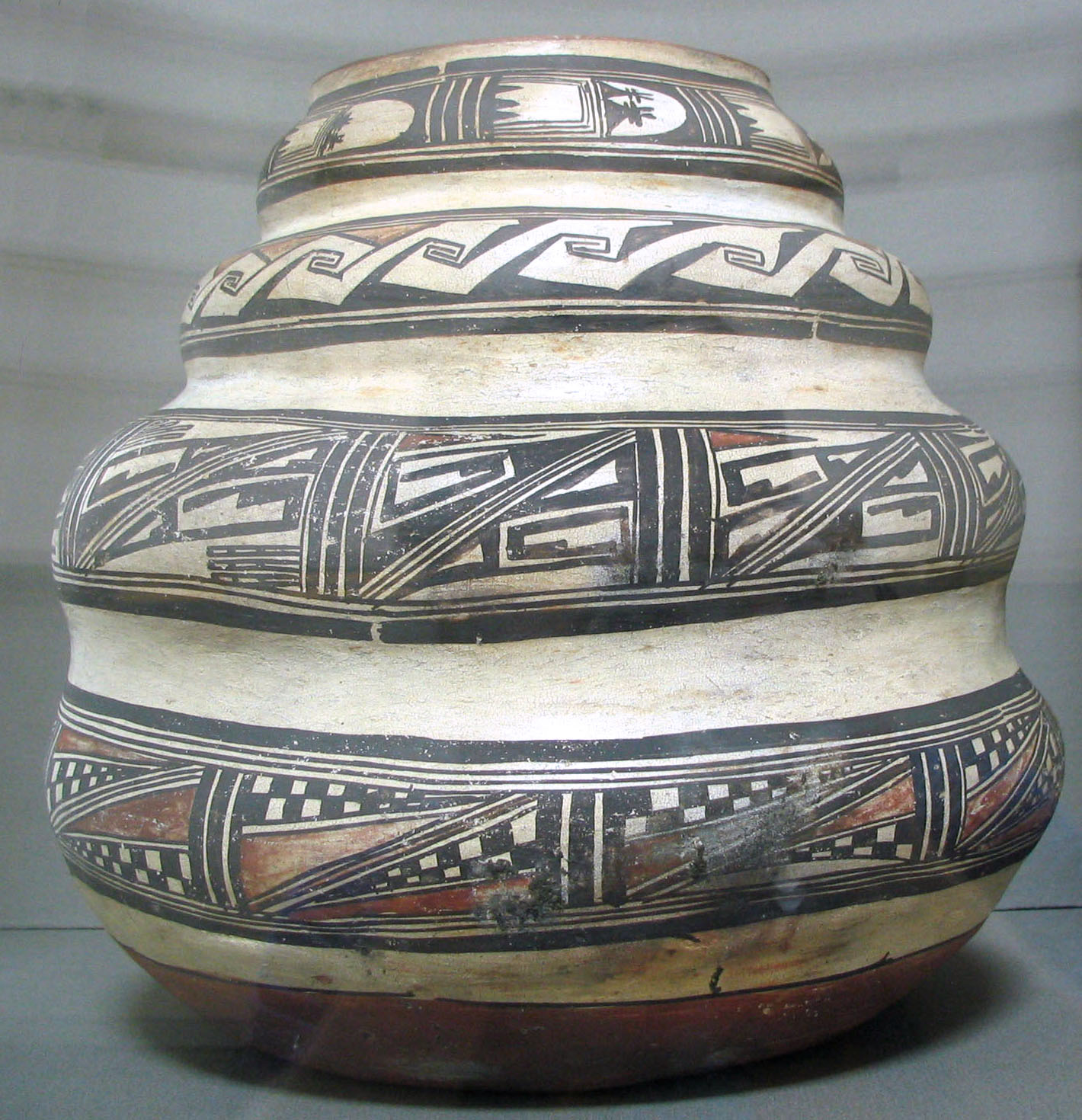
- Hopi jar by 1986 inductee Nampeyo
- Established: 1979
- Website: Arizona Women's Hall of Fame

The Arizona Women's Hall of Fame recognizes women natives or residents of the U.S. state of Arizona for their significant achievements or statewide contributions. In 1979, the office of Governor Bruce Babbitt worked with the Arizona Women's Commission to create the Hall of Fame. The first inductees were named in October 1981. During its first decade, the Hall of Fame was overseen by the Arizona Historical Society and the Arizona Department of Library, Archives and Public Records. A steering committee selected a varying number of women to be inducted each year. The 1991 inclusion of Planned Parenthood creator Margaret Sanger resulted in disapproval from some in the Arizona Legislature, and funding dried up. With the lone exception of María Urquides in 1994, there were no Hall of Fame inductees for over a decade. Inductions finally resumed in 2002, when the Hall of Fame has only inducted new honorees every two years. The award returned to being annual in 2018.

In 2023, AZWHF created a scholarship awarded to an individual pursuing a degree in a museum program or a history discipline with an emphasis on women.

As of 2024, sponsorship of the Arizona Women's Hall of Fame is provided by Arizona Humanities, the Arizona Secretary of State, the Arizona State Capital Museum, Arizona State Libraries and Archives, Arizona Heritage Center at Papago Park, SRP, Arizona Community Foundation, PBS – Horizonte, the Arizona Historical Society, C.L. Russell, and Front Doors.

== Inductees ==
Arizona Women's Hall of Fame
Name	Image	Birth–death	Year	Area of achievement	Ref(s)
Rosa Bruce		(–2017)	2025	Casa Grande housing director	
Lillian Piñon Carrillo			2025		
Dora Perry		(1926–2022)	2025	Artist	
Angela Ruíz Tewksbury		(1926–2011)	2025	Activist and first Latina to serve on the Globe Unified School District Board of Education	
Myra Dinnerstein	Black and white photograph of a smiling white woman	(1934–)	2025	Founding director of the women's studies program at the University of Arizona	
Gabby Giffords	White woman with blond hair sitting at a desk with flags behind her	(1970–)	2025	Politician and gun control activist	
Socorro Hernandez-Bernasconi			2025	Activist	
Josephine Pete			2025	Activist and educator	
Ofelia Zepeda		(1952–)	2025	Professor of linguistics at the University of Arizona, known for her efforts in the preservation of and promotion of literacy in Tohono O'odham	
LaVerne Williams		(1922–2018)	2023	Bisbee politician and community organizer	
Eleanor Ragsdale		(1926–1998)	2023	Civil rights activist	
Theodora Marsh		(1867–1936)	2023	Businesswoman and politician	
Terri Cruz		(1927–2017)	2023	Prominent community advocate and activist	
Octaviana J. Trujillo			2023	Activist bringing educational reform and change to indigenous people of Arizona	
Emma Torres			2023	Co-founder and executive director of Campesinos Sin Fronteras	
Denise Resnik			2023	President/CEO of First Place AZ, co-founder of the Southwest Autism Research & Resource Center, and founder and CEO of DRA Collective	
Diana Yazzie Devine			2023	CEO of Native American Connections	
Dosia Carlson		(1930–2021)	2022	Pastor, composer of religious hymns, disability and geriatric rights advocate, professor, and writer	
Sheila Grinell			2022	Science communication and co-developer of the concept of interactive concept museums	
Edna Landin		(1897–1967)	2022	Led the revitalization of Tombstone, Arizona	
Janet Napolitano		(b. 1957)	2022	21st governor of Arizona, 2003–2009, third United States secretary of homeland security, and president of the University of California	
Victoria Mary Stephens		(b. 1951)	2022	First Native American woman to earn a doctor of medicine degree in the state of Arizona and orthopedic surgeon	
Pearl Tang		(1922–2021)	2022	First Asian-American physician who began pre-natal clinics, maternity, and infant care that greatly decreased infant mortality in Arizona	
Barbara Barrett		(1950–)	2021	Political advisor to the U.S. Mission to the United Nations, member of the U.S. Afghan Women's Council, and president of the International Women's Forum	
Armida Guerena Bittner		(1938–2022)	2021	Educator	
Mary Black		(1950–2020)	2021	Founder and CEO of Black Family & Child Services	
Margie Emmerman			2021	Executive director of the Arizona Mexico Commission, policy advisor for Latin America and Mexico, director of Tourism, and director of the Department of Commerce	
Jane Dee Hull		(1925–2020)	2021	Governor of Arizona	
Gerda Weissmann Klein		(1924–2022)	2021	Holocaust survivor	
Betsey Bayless		(b. 1944)	2020	Arizona secretary of state	
Jana Bommersbach		(1945–2024)	2020	Journalist	
Betty Fairfax		(1918–2010)	2020	Philanthropist, namesake of Betty H. Fairfax High School	
Jean E. Fairfax		(1920–2019)	2020	Activist and philanthropist, director of Community Services of the NAACP 1965–1984	
Gracia Liliana Fernandez		(1875–1957)	2020	Educator	
Michele Halyard			2020	Professor of Radiation Oncology at the Mayo Clinic	
Pauline O'Neill		(1865–1961)	2020	Suffragist	
Karrin Taylor Robson		(b. 1964/1965)	2020	Arizona Board of Regents, founder of Arizona Strategies	
Catherine Steele			2020	Teacher and academic administrator working with the San Carlos Apache community	
Carolyn Warner		(1930–2018)	2020	Arizona superintendent of Public Instruction	
Shelley Cohn			2019	Former chair of Arizona Community Foundation, Arizona Commission on the Arts	
Kate Cory		(1861–1958)	2019	Photographer, sculptor, painter and muralist	
Emma Lee French		(1836–1897)	2019	Established and maintained Lee's Ferry on the Colorado River	
Sharon Harper			2019	President, CEO and co-founder of Plaza Companies	
Guadalupe Huerta		(1920–2000)	2019	Arizona lobbyist for the elderly in Washington during the Clinton administration	
Cindy Hensley McCain		(b. 1954)	2019	Board chair of the McCain Institute	
Rosa Lyons McKay		(1881–1934)	2019	First female legislator from Cochise County	
Barbara Rodriguez Mundell		(b. 1955)	2019	First woman and first Hispanic to be selected as presiding judge of the Maricopa County Superior Court	
Erma Bombeck		(1927–1996)	2018	Columnist, author	
Josefina Franco		(1897–1972)	2018	Newspaper owner, editor, community leader	
Maria Garcia		(1898–unknown)	2018	Community activist	
Margaret Injasoulian		(1936–2015)	2018	Media and community leader	
Alison Levine		(b. 1966)	2018	Mountain climber, explorer, author	
Bridgie M. Porter		(1929–2001)	2018	Arizona Legislature	
Mary Jo West			2018	Broadcaster	
Rebecca Dallis		(1896–1971)	2017	Educator	
Sister Clare Dunn		(1934–1981)	2017	First US nun in public office, only nun to serve in the Arizona State Legislature (1974–1981)	
Gladys McGarey		(b. 1920)	2017	M.D., M.D.H, co-founded the American Holistic Medical Association (AHMA)	
Clara M. Schell		(1872–1955)	2017	First female optometrist in the Territory of Arizona	
Louise Serpa		(1925–2012)	2017	Rodeo photographer	
Christine Kajikawa Wilkinson		(b. 1944)	2017	First minority female vice president in the history of Arizona State University	
Julia Zozaya		(1926–2004)	2017	Vice president of both the National Federation for the Blind and the League of United Latin American Citizens (LULAC); owned and operated the first 24/7 Spanish-speaking FM radio station in Phoenix	
Marietta Bryant		(1911–2003)	2015	African-American teacher who brought a suit against the school district that closed her school	
Daisy Moore		(1908–1985)	2015	African-American teacher who brought a suit against the school district that closed her school	
Lorraine W. Frank		(1923–2005)	2015	Founder and first executive director of the Arizona Humanities Council	
Louise Foucar Marshall		(1864–1956)	2015	First female professor in Arizona	
Helen K. Mason		(1912–2003)	2015	Founder and executive director of the Black Theatre Troupe	
Lucy Sikorsky		(1899–1972)	2015	Physician	
Rose E. Collom		(1870–1956)	2013	Botanist and authority in the native plants of Arizona; Mentzelia collomiae named for her	
Jean Chaudhuri		(1937–1997)	2013	Muscogee-Creek activist, author and storyteller	
Helen Sekaquaptewa		(1898–1990)	2013	Hopi author and matriarch of the Eagle Clan	
Jacque Yelland Steiner		(1929–2003)	2013	Legislator, founder of the Children's Action Alliance	
Dorothy Elaine Powell		(1921–2003)	2013	Community and social activist, advocate for elderly	
Helene Thomas Bennett		(1901–1988)	2010	First woman elected to the Yuma School Board, founding member of Arizona Public Health Association	
Alice M. Birdsall		(1880–1958)	2010	Arizona's second female attorney	
Pauline Bates Brown		(1901–1963)	2010	Journalist	
Jean Maddock Clark		(1909–1991)	2010	Educator, scout leader, first women in Arizona to be awarded the Golden Eaglet from the Girl Scouts of the USA	
Anne E. Lindeman		(1932–2001)	2010	Arizona House of Representatives, Arizona Senate	
Betty Accomazzo		(1926–1989)	2008	Author, editor, 1983 inductee to National Cowgirl Museum and Hall of Fame	
Katharine Bartlett		(1907–2001)	2008	Anthropologist associated with Museum of Northern Arizona	
C. Louise Boehringer		(1878–1956)	2008	First female superintendent of schools, Yuma County	
Sister Kathleen Clark		(1919–2003)	2008	Roman Catholic nun who established Casa de los Ninos, a nursery for abused infants and toddlers	
Jessie Gray Bevan		(1872–1963)	2006	Arizona House of Representatives	
Lucretia Breazeale Hamilton		(1908–1986)	2006	Botanist, illustrator	
Ethel Maynard		(1905–1980)	2006	First African-American woman elected to the Arizona state legislature	
Patricia Ann McGee		(1926–1994)	2006	President of Yavapai-Prescott tribe, granddaughter of Viola Jimulla	
Polly Rosenbaum		(1899–2003)	2006	Arizona's longest-serving state senator	
Veora Johnson		(1910–2001)	2004	Educator	
Louise Lincoln Kerr		(1892–1977)	2004	Musician	
Winona E. Montgomery		(1898–1990)	2004	Educator	
Clara Lee Tanner		(1905–1997)	2004	Anthropologist, authority on Southwest indigenous culture	
Mary Elizabeth Post		(1841–1934)	2002	Educator	
Annie Dodge Wauneka		(1910–1997)	2002	Navajo Tribal Council, worked to eradicate tuberculosis on the reservation, awarded the Medal of Freedom by Lyndon B. Johnson on December 6, 1963	
Maria Urquides		(1908–1994)	1994	Educator	
Margaret Bell Douglas		(1880–1963)	1991	Botanist, horticulturalist	
Margaret Taylor Hance		(1923–1990)	1991	First female mayor of Phoenix	
Polingaysi Qöyawayma (Elizabeth Q. White)		(1892–1990)	1991	Hopi who converted to Christianity, became educated in white schools, and returned to teach on the Hopi Reservation	
Margaret Sanger Slee		(1879–1966)	1991	Birth control advocate	
Ola Young		(1869–1966)	1991	Early settler in Pleasant Valley, postmistress, rancher	
Clara Osborne Botzum		(1894–1986)	1990	Arizona House of Representatives	
Vernell Coleman		(1918–1990)	1990	Community activist	
Josephine Brawley Hughes		(1839–1926)	1990	Early settler and wife of Arizona Governor L. C. Hughes	
Elizabeth Shannon		(1906–1985)	1990	Educator	
Minnie McFarland Stevens		(1911–1986)	1990	First female creel census taker, operated the Sterling Springs fish hatchery for twenty-seven years	
Florence Brookhart Yount		(1909–1988)	1990	Physician	
Guess Eleanor Birchett		(1881–1979)	1989	The Birdlady of Tempe	
Polly Hicks Brown		(1883–1966)	1989	Rancher, business owner, became a rodeo queen at age 83	
Jessie Benton Evans		(1866–1954)	1989	Artist	
Mary "Mollie" E. Fly		(1847–1925)	1989	Photographer, wife of C. S. Fly	
Elizabeth S. Oldaker		(1884–1975)	1989	Historic preservationist	
Minna Vrang Orme		(1892–1970)	1989	Founder of The Orme School	
Grace Chapella		(1874–1980)	1988	Hopi potter	
Josephine W. Goldwater		(1875–1966)	1988	Mother of Barry Goldwater, Arizona's first female golf champion	
Hallie Bost Wright Hopkins		(1885–1978)	1988	Farmer	
Sister Clara Otero		(1850–1905)	1988	Educator, Roman Catholic nun	
Thamar Richey		(1858–1937)	1988	Educator	
Mary V. Riley		(1908–1987)	1988	First woman elected to the White Mountain Apache Tribal Council	
Eulalia "Sister" Bourne		(1897–1984)	1987	Author, educator, rancher	
Ann-Eve Mansfeld Johnson		(1908–1981)	1987	Historic preservationist, children's advocate	
Abbie W. Keith		(1888–1984)	1987	Arizona Cattle Growers Association	
Jessie Harper Linde		(1887–1965)	1987	Patron of the arts, co-founder of American Association of Concert Managers and the Salt River Valley Community Concert Association	
Hattie Greene Lockett		(1880–1962)	1987	Author, rancher	
Clara T. Woody		(1885–1981)	1987	Collector of Arizona history	
Mary Elizabeth Jane Colter		(1869–1956)	1986	Architect who designed multiple structures in the Grand Canyon National Park	
Helen Congdon D'Autremont		(1889–1966)	1986	Founder Tucson chapter of the League of Women Voters; founding trustee of Prescott College, co-founder of Tucson Medical Center and Arizona-Sonora Desert Museum	
Minnie K. Guenther		(1890–1982)	1986	Missionary to the White Mountain Apache Tribe	
Viola Jimulla		(1878–1966)	1986	First chieftess of Yavapai tribe	
Nampeyo		(1860–1942)	1986	Hopi potter	
Ruth Reinhold		(1902–1985)	1986	Aviator	
Clarissa Winsor		(1880–1974)	1986	Historic preservationist; curator of the Yuma Territorial Prison museum	
Ida Redbird		(1892–1971)	1985	Master Maricopa potter	
Sarah Herring Sorin		(1861–1914)	1985	First woman attorney in Arizona and the first woman to try a case in front of the United States Supreme Court unassisted by a male attorney	
Grace M. Sparkes		(1893–1963)	1985	Historic preservationist, tourism booster, community organizer	
Louisa Wade Wetherill		(1877–1945)	1985	Authority on Navajo culture	
Rachel Emma Allen Berry		(1859–1948)	1984	Arizona House of Representatives, first woman in the United States elected to a state legislature	
Nellie Cashman		(1845–1925)	1984	Restaurateur, advocated against violence and against public hangings, caregiver to orphans	
Sallie Davis Hayden		(1842–1907)	1984	Rancher	
Elsie Toles		(1888–1957)	1984	First female superintendent of public instruction	
Carmen Soto Vasquez		(1861–1934)	1984	Founder of El Teatro Carmen	
Mary Bernard Aguirre		(1844–1906)	1983	Educator	
Angela Hutchinson Hammer		(1870–1955)	1983	Newspaper publisher	
Laura E. Herron		(1892–1966)	1983	Educator, physical education	
Edith Stratton Kitt		(1878–1968)	1983	Historian	
Ann Cornwall Neal		(1888–1972)	1983	Community activist	
Jane H. Rider		(1889–1981)	1983	Arizona's first female civic engineer	
Nellie T. Bush		(1888–1963)	1982	Riverboat pilot, justice of the peace, Arizona House of Representatives, Arizona Senate	
Eulalia Elias		(1788–1865)	1982	Rancher	
Ana Frohmiller		(1891–1971)	1982	Politician	
Maie Bartlett Heard		(1868–1951)	1982	Co-founder of Heard Museum	
Frances Lillian Willard Munds		(1866–1948)	1982	Women's suffrage movement, member of Arizona Senate	
Placida Garcia Smith		(1896–1981)	1982	Educator	
Mary-Russell Ferrell Colton		(1889–1971)	1981	Co-founder of the Museum of Northern Arizona	
Cordelia Adams Crawford		(1865–1943)	1981	Early settler known for her healing skills, developed trust and friendship with the Apache	
Sharlot Hall		(1870–1943)	1981	Journalist, poet, historian, Sharlot Hall Museum named in her honor	
Isabella Greenway King		(1886–1953)	1981	First U.S. congresswoman from Arizona	
Lorna Lockwood		(1903–1977)	1981	Chief justice, Arizona Supreme Court; first woman state Chief Justice in United States history	
Anna Moore Shaw		(1898–1976)	1981	Author, born on the Gila River Indian reservation	
