= Edith Stratton Kitt =

American historian

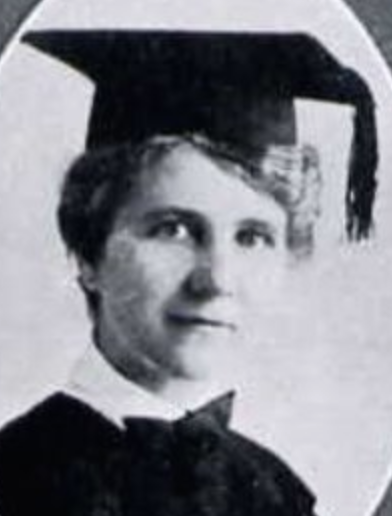
- Edith Stratton Kitt, from the 1920 yearbook of the University of Arizona
- Born: Edith Olive Stratton; 1878; Florence, Arizona, U.S.
- Died: January 18, 1968; Sacramento, California, U.S.
- Other names: Edith O. Kitt
- Occupation(s): Educator, historian

Edith Olive Stratton Kitt (December 15, 1878 – January 18, 1968) was an American clubwoman and historian, who expanded the collections and membership of the Arizona Historical Society as secretary of the society from 1925 to 1947. She was inducted into the Arizona Women's Hall of Fame in 1983.

== Early life and education ==
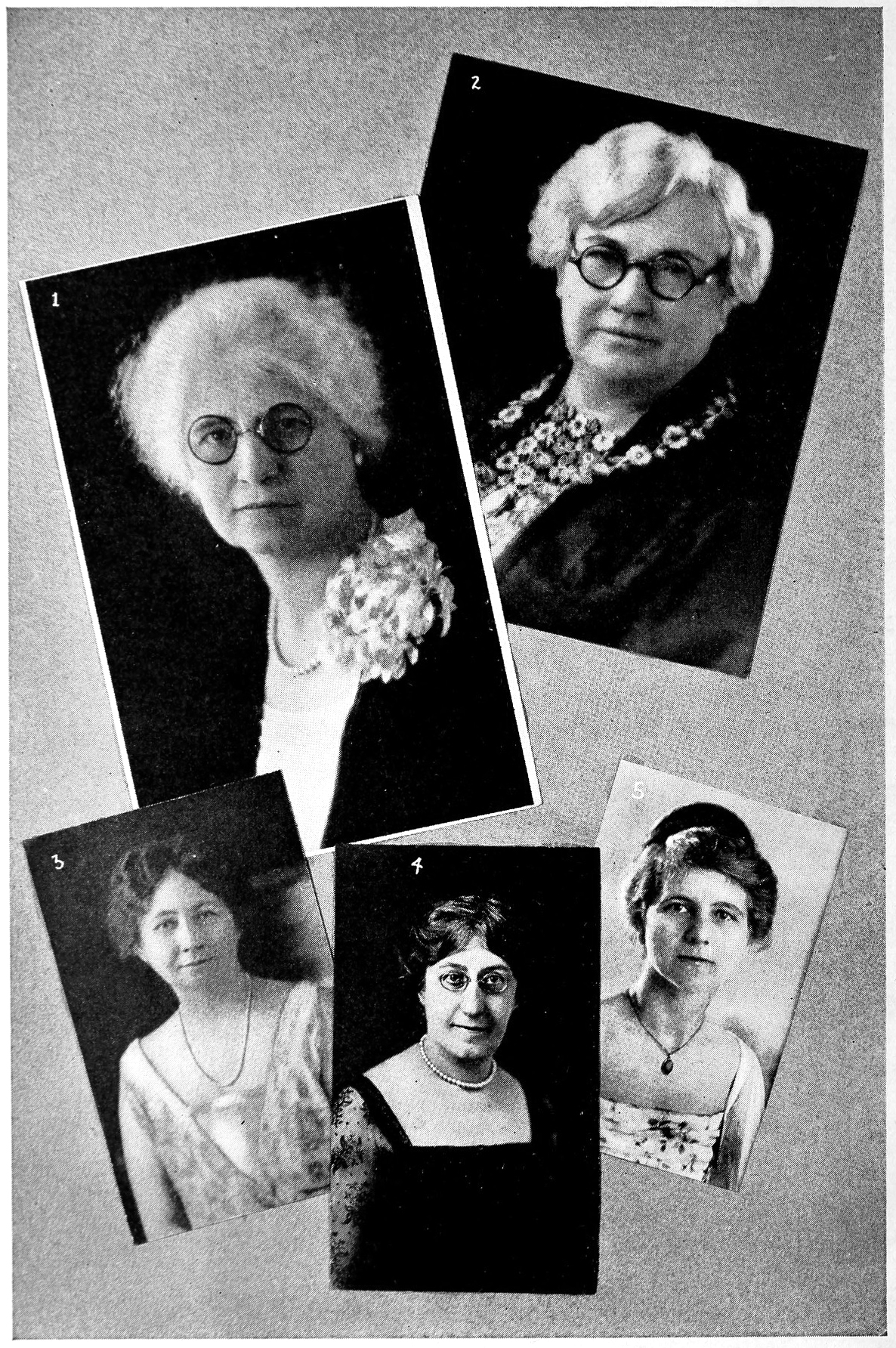
A Few of the Eminent Women of Arizona from a 1928 publication: C. Louise Boehringer, Mattie L. Williams, Maie Bartlett Heard, Margaret Wheeler Ross, Edith O. Kitt

Stratton was born in an adobe house with a dirt floor in Florence, Arizona, and raised on a cattle ranch, the daughter of Emerson Oliver Stratton and Caroline Crocker Ames Stratton. She graduated from high school in Los Angeles in 1900. She completed a bachelor's degree at the University of Arizona at age 41, in 1920.

== Career ==
Stratton taught school in Arizona and Colorado as a young woman. She was a founder and president of the Tucson Woman's Club, and president of the Arizona State Federation of Woman's Clubs. She was also active in the Tucson Fine Arts Association, the University of Arizona Alumni Association, and the Tucson Collegiate Club.

Kitt became secretary of the Arizona Pioneers' Society (later renamed the Arizona Historical Society) in 1925, and continued in that post until 1947, and remained active with the society for the rest of her life. She focused on collecting archival materials and oral histories, and on increasing the society's membership and budget. She collaborated with the Historic American Buildings Survey (HABS) in the 1930s, to have ruins near Tucson surveyed and photographed. She was on the editorial staff of the Arizona Historical Review.

In 1963, Kitt was named "First Lady of Arizona's Territorial Centennial". "You can't say anything about preserving history without giving supreme credit to Edith Kitt and Sharlot Hall," said Bert Fireman of the Arizona Historical Foundation in 1970. "These women were out collecting at an early time."

== Publications ==
- "Reminiscences of Juan A. Tellez" (1936)
- "Arizona Place Name Records" (1952, with T. M. Pearce)
- Pioneering in Arizona: the Reminiscences of Emerson Oliver Stratton and Edith Stratton Kitt (1964)

== Personal life ==
In 1903, Stratton married George Farwell Kitt. They had two children, also named Edith and George. Her husband died in 1935, and she died in 1968, at the age of 89, in Sacramento, California. Her papers are in the collections she once oversaw, at the Arizona Historical Society. In 1983, she was posthumously inducted into the Arizona Women's Hall of Fame.
