= Clare Dunne =

Clare Dunne or Dunn may refer to:

- Clare Dunne (Irish actress)
- Clare Dunn, American country musician
- Claire Dunne (born 1937), Irish-born Australian actress
- Clare Dunn (nun), (1934–July 30, 1981), American Catholic nun and state legislator in Arizona
