= Jesse Benton (disambiguation) =

Jesse Benton may refer to:

- Jesse Benton Jr. (c. 1783–1843), American settler
- Jesse Benton (b. 1977), American political operative

== See also ==
- Jessie Benton Frémont, niece of Jesse Benton Jr.
- Jessie Benton Evans, American artist
