= Jean Chaudhuri =

American community leader

- Jean Chaudhuri, from a 1971 newspaper
- Born: Ella Jean Hill; May 29, 1937; Okemah, Oklahoma
- Died: February 17, 1997 (aged 59); Tempe, Arizona
- Occupation(s): Community leader, writer, activist

Ella Jean Hill Chaudhuri (May 29, 1937 – February 17, 1997) was an American community leader, activist, and author. She was a member of the Muscogee (Creek) Nation, executive director of the Tucson Indian Center, and director of the Traditional Indian Alliance. She was inducted into the Arizona Women's Hall of Fame posthumously, in 2013.

== Early life ==
Ella Jean Hill was born in Okemah, Oklahoma, the daughter of Wilbur Hill and Mary Anna Hill. She was a member of the Muscogee (Creek) Nation, and spoke Creek as her first language. She graduated from Central High School in Tulsa in 1955, and attended Oklahoma City University, where she met her husband.

== Career ==
Chaudhuri was involved in a variety of programs for and by Native Americans in Oklahoma, Florida, and Arizona. In 1972, she ran unsuccessfully for city commissioner in Tallahassee. She was executive director of the Tucson Indian Center, and director of the Traditional Indian Alliance of Greater Tucson. Under her leadership, the Alliance founded a health clinic in Tucson, and dance classes organized by her sister, Richinda Sands. In 1979, she came under FBI scrutiny when some Alliance members charged that she had mishandled funds.

In Phoenix, she was president of the Arizona chapter of Indian Women in Progress (IWP). She was founder and co-chair of the Native American Heritage Preservation Coalition, and was active with the Phoenix Indian School Preservation Coalition Project. Chaudhuri wrote and produced a musical comedy, Indians Discover Christopher Columbus, in 1992. She also wrote and performed a one-woman play titled Four Seasons of an Indian Woman's Life. She and her husband wrote A Sacred Path: the Way of the Muscogee Creeks (2001), which he completed and published after her death.

Chaudhuri received the Jefferson Award from the American Institute of Public Service in 1977. Among several posthumous honors, she was inducted into the Arizona Women's Hall of Fame in 2013.

== Personal life ==
In 1957, Ella Jean Hill married Joyotpaul Chaudhuri (1933–2020), a political science professor born in India. They had two sons, Joydev and Jonodev. She died from complications of diabetes in 1997, aged 59 years, in Tempe, Arizona. Her son Jonodev Osceola Chaudhuri was named chairman of the National Indian Gaming Commission in 2014, and in 2019 he became ambassador for the Muscogee (Creek) Nation in Washington, D.C.
