= Mary Black (activist) =

American advocate for underserved families and nonprofit pioneer

Mary Magdalene Black (April 9, 1950- March 21, 2020) was an American advocate for underserved families and nonprofit pioneer. She founded and led the Black Family and Child Services of Arizona.

== Biography ==
Mary Magdalene Buggs was born on April 9, 1950 in Ruston, Louisiana to Sam and Al Dora Buggs. She was the youngest of seven children. After graduating from Grambling State University with a degree in social work, she married Willie Black and moved to Louisiana.

Black worked at the Arizona Child Protective Services, where she observed a large disparity in foster and adoptive homes available to Black children. She began a statewide program dedicated to placing Black children and founded the Arizona Minority Child Network, a forum for social workers to improve social services.

In 1984, Black began working on what became the Black Family and Child Services of Arizona, which places children in foster and adoptive homes, provides therapy and substance abuse counseling, and hosts after-school programs and services to at-risk youth. She led the organization for 35 years.

Black retired in October 2019 due to illness. She died on March 21, 2020.

== Honors and awards ==
- Top 50 Most Powerful Activists in Phoenix, Phoenix magazine
- Phoenix Area’s Most Influential Women in Business, Today’s Arizona Woman
- Martin Luther King “the Living Dream Award”
- 2012: Arizona’s 48 Most Intriguing Women
- 2014: Honored by Phoenix Suns on Martin Luther King Day for leadership and service to the greater Phoenix community
- 2021: Inducted into Arizona Women's Hall of Fame
