= William Herring (politician) =

American lawyer, politician, and businessman (1833–1912)

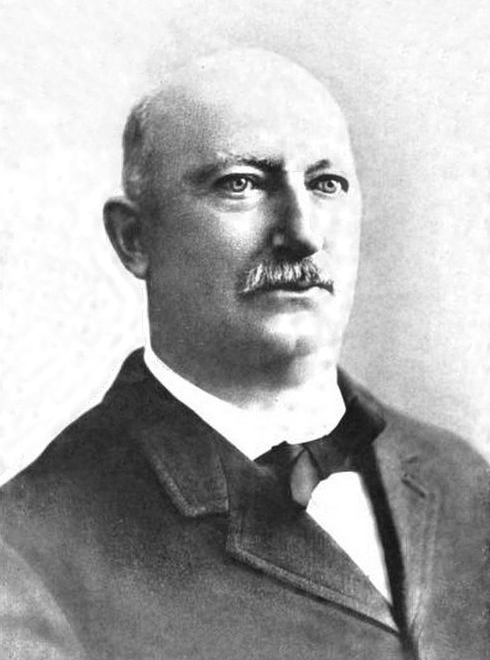
William Herring

William Herring (January 31, 1833 – July 10, 1912) was an American lawyer, politician, and businessman. He represented Westchester County, New York, during the 1873 session of the New York State Assembly and was a Republican.

== Biography ==
Herring was born in New Brunswick, New Jersey and went to the New York public schools. He received his law degree from Columbia Law School and was admitted to the New York bar in 1866.

Herring served as an assistant district attorney in New York from 1874 to 1880. He also served on the board of education in New York in 1876. In 1880, after the death of his brother Joe Herring, William Herring moved to Bisbee, Arizona Territory, to take possession of his property, the Neptune Mine. Eventually, Herring moved to Tombstone, Arizona Territory, and continued to practice law. His daughter Sarah Herring Sorin also practiced law with her father. He served as the attorney general for the Arizona Territory and on the first Arizona Constitutional Convention. He continued to be involved with the Republican Party. He introduced the first bill while serving in the New York Assembly to provide for the observance of Decoration Day. Herring died on July 10, 1912, in Tucson, Arizona.

== Footnotes ==
New York State Assembly
Preceded by James J. Mooney	New York State Assembly; Westchester County, 3rd District; 1873	Succeeded by William Cauldwell
