= Veora Johnson =

Educator and school administrator

- Born: April 21, 1910; Navasota, Texas
- Died: November 15, 2001 (aged 91)
- Education: Arizona State University
- Known for: educator and administrator

Veora Johnson (April 21, 1910- November 15, 2001) was an Arizona educator and humanitarian. She was the first black educational administrator in Arizona.

== Biography ==
Johnson was born on April 21, 1910, in Navasota, Texas to Albert and Annie Blackshear Johnson. She was their eighth child out off ten. Johnson was the valedictorian of her high school class and graduated magna cum laude from Prairie View University at just eighteen. She went on to earn a degree in elementary administration from Arizona State University. Johnson was the founding president of the Delta Beta Omega chapter of the Alpha Kappa Alpha sorority at Arizona State. She started the first black Greek letter organization in Arizona, Alpha Sigma. She also completed graduate work at the University of Arizona, the University of Hawaiʻi, and the University of Southern California, and collected several bachelor's and master's degrees.

In 1927, Johnson, a student at Prairie View Normal Institute, was planning on going to California to be an actress. At the time, Mesa superintendent Herman Hendrix was contacting university presidents looking for a young Black teacher to join the district to serve as a role model for the Black students in the classroom. At her principal's behest, she instead went to Arizona to teach at the Booker T. Washington Elementary School in Mesa. The school was a Black school in a segregated district, with many students not graduating from high school. Johnson had learned to teach high school, so the Mesa school district paid for her to attend night school to learn how to teach elementary grades. Johnson was generous, giving needy students clothing and toiletries, and finding people to make dresses for girls who could not afford them for graduation.

Johnson taught at Booker T. Washington Elementary for seventeen years. In 1945, she became the school's principal. In this position, Johnson was the first Black woman in Arizona to hold administration credentials in education and the first Black principal in Mesa. She became the principal of Irving Elementary in 1967. She also served as a curriculum and primary education consultant for the city. Johnson retired in 1974.

Johnson served on seven boards. Two were at the state level. One was by Supreme Court appointment.

Johnson died on November 15, 2001, of stomach cancer. She was buried in Navasota, Texas.

== Legacy and Honors ==
On Martin Luther King Day, the Mesa MLK Committee awards the Veora E. Johnson Spirit of Unity awards.

- Golden Soror
- 1953: Mesa's Citizen of the Year
- 1958: Who's Who in Arizona
- 1967: American Association of University Women Woman of the Year
- 1974: World Who's Who of Women
- 1983: The Veora E. Johnson Elementary School in Mesa, Arizona is named in Johnson's honor. This was the first time an elementary school had been named for someone from the school district.
- 1985: Arizona State University Medallion of Excellence
- 2004: Arizona Women's Hall of Fame
