= Clara M. Schell =

American optometrist and political activist

- Born: Clara M. Kaub; June 27, 1872; Chicago, Illinois
- Died: April 24, 1955 (aged 82); Tucson, Arizona
- Education: Northern Illinois College of Ophthalmology and Optometry, 1902
- Occupation: Optometrist
- Years active: 1902-1946
- Children: 2

Clara Schell (June 27, 1872 – April 24, 1955) was the first female optometrist in Arizona and an activist. She was active in the woman's suffrage, women's rights, and animal rights movements in Tucson, Arizona.

== Early life ==
Clara Kaub was born in Chicago, Illinois on June 27, 1872, to Charles and Catherine Kellar Kaub. She earned a degree from the University of Chicago. On February 20, 1891, she married Henry A. Schell in Kenosha, Wisconsin. In 1898, she and her husband moved to Morenci, Arizona, where Henry practiced optometry. Due to Henry's asthma, the Schells moved to Tucson, Arizona in 1990. That year, Clara enrolled in the Northern Illinois College of Ophthalmology and Optometry, graduating in September 1902.

== Optometry career ==
After graduating in 1902, Schell returned to Arizona to join her husband in the Tucson firm Schell and Schell. She was the first female optometrist in Arizona and one of the first female optometrist in the country. They traveled widely through southern Arizona and Sonora, providing medical care in rural areas.

Henry was the board president of Arizona's Territorial Board of Optometry, which standardized the state's license examinations and optometry practice. In 1907, the Schells were issued Licenses No. 1 and No. 2. In 1909, the Schells were charter members of the Arizona Optical Society. They were later charter members of the Arizona Optometric Association and Clara was elected as the first female State President in 1926.

After divorcing Henry Schell, Clara practiced with her son and in solo practice. She retired in 1946.

== Activism ==
Schell was a clubwoman and involved in Tucson's suffrage, women's, and animal rights movements. She was the commander of the Old Pueblo Hive, Women's Benefit Association of the Maccabees. She organized rallies and co-founded the Equal Suffrage Club of Pima County.

Schell helped found the Tucson Business and Professional Women (BPW) and served as its president from 1922 to 1924. In the position, she organized a meeting with a national speaker to discuss the Equal Rights Amendment and addressed an Arizona minimum wage law for women. She traveled to Phoenix to lobby against the passage of Representative Rosa McKay's 1923 bill increasing the minimum wage for women, because the Tucson BPW believed it would lead to young girls losing jobs, consumer prices increasing, and Arizona losing business. The McKay bill was signed into law in February 1923 and was declared unconstitutional in 1925.

Schell was also active in founding the Tucson YWCA, Arizona Children's Home, and the Arizona Human Society in Tucson.

== Personal life ==
The Schells adopted two children together, William and Helen. They divorced in 1929.

Clara Schell died in Tucson on April 24, 1955.

== Awards and honors ==
- 1948: Arizona State Association of Optometrists, life membership
- 2017: Arizona Women's Hall of Fame
- National Humane Society, life membership
