= Jane H. Rider =

Engineer and bacteriologist

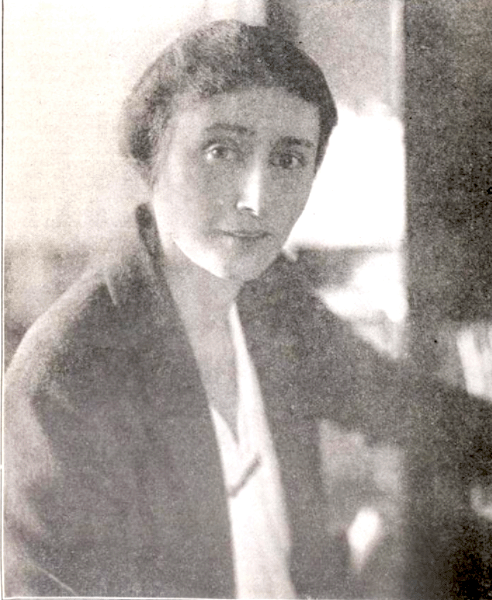
- Rider in Sunset Magazine April 1924 issue
- Born: August 18, 1889; Sewickley, Pennsylvania
- Died: March 4, 1981 (aged 91); Phoenix, Arizona
- Education: University of Arizona, 1911
- Occupation: Engineer

Jane H. Rider (August 18, 1889 – March 4, 1981) was an American engineer and bacteriologist. She was the first female engineer in Arizona. Her career largely focused on the health field, including sanitary engineering, hospital surveying, and hospital construction. She worked as the Arizona State Director of Hospital Surveys from 1948 to 1961.

== Biography ==
Jane Herbst Rider was born on August 18, 1889, to Percy Sower Rider and Bessie (née Herbst) Rider in Sewickley, Pennsylvania. Her father and grandfather were both engineers, partially inspiring her profession.

In 1911, Rider was the first female engineering graduate at the University of Arizona, achieving a bachelors degree and being the fourth graduate of the Department of Civil Engineering. She was the first woman licensed in Arizona as an engineer. Rider also completed some graduate work at the University of Pennsylvania.

In her senior year of college, Rider discovered an interest in bacteriology. After she graduated from College, Rider worked as a bacteriologist at the Arizona State Laboratories (now the Arizona Health Services Laboratory). In 1916, she became the director of the lab– the first woman in the position. In this position, she ensured the safety of Arizona's water and milk and promoted sanitation and pasteurization. The lab also tested food and drugs, as there was not yet a federal act to do so.

During World War I, Rider took a leave of absence to work with the American Red Cross.

In 1920, Rider's role was expanded to include her commission as a Collaboration Sanitary Engineer by the Public Health Service. In this position, she inspected water supplies shipped interstate on the Southern Pacific and Santa Fe Railroads. That year, there was a botulism outbreak in Florence, Arizona, which involved searching a dump for cans with the causative agent (in this instance, canned beets).

Rider and a Public Health Engineer conducted a large survey, an E. coli index of irrigation ditches. The project was a large and complicated one. The Public Health Service published the results and Rider presented the project to the American Public Health Association in 1930.

In 1935, Rider moved to Phoenix to take a job as the coordinator of women's projects at the Works Progress Administration. She was later appointed to head the Arizona National Youth Administration. She served in both positions until the agencies separated in 1939. Following the separation, she served as the director of the Arizona NYA office until it was discontinued She was one of only seven women to lead a state NYA office.

In 1947, Rider was appointed to chairman of the Arizona State Board of Health, in this position, she was responsible for the allocation of 2.5 million dollars in federal funding as a result of the Hill-Burton Act of 1946.

In 1948, Rider began working as the state director of hospital surveys. She remained in this position until her retirement in 1961.

In 1950, she presented a paper titled "Sanitation Features of Irrigation Projects" at the annual convention of the American Public Health Association in Fort Worth. where she In 1964, she returned to work as the head of the Arizona Health Department's Hospital and Nursing Home Licensing Division, with special permissions being made for her to work past the department's retirement age.

Rider died on March 4, 1981.

== Awards and honors ==
- 1931: accepted to the American Society of Civil Engineers as the second female full member
- March 1, 1960: 75th Anniversary Medallion of Merit, University of Arizona
- 1963: Distinguished Citizen Award, University of Arizona
- 1970: Phoenix Woman of the Year, Phoenix Advertising Club
- 1982: Arizona Women's Hall of Fame
- An endowed scholarship in Rider's name is awarded annually to several Civil Engineering and Engineering Mechanics students
- Senior member of the National Society of Women Engineers
