= Cordelia Adams Crawford =

American pioneer and healer (1865-1943)

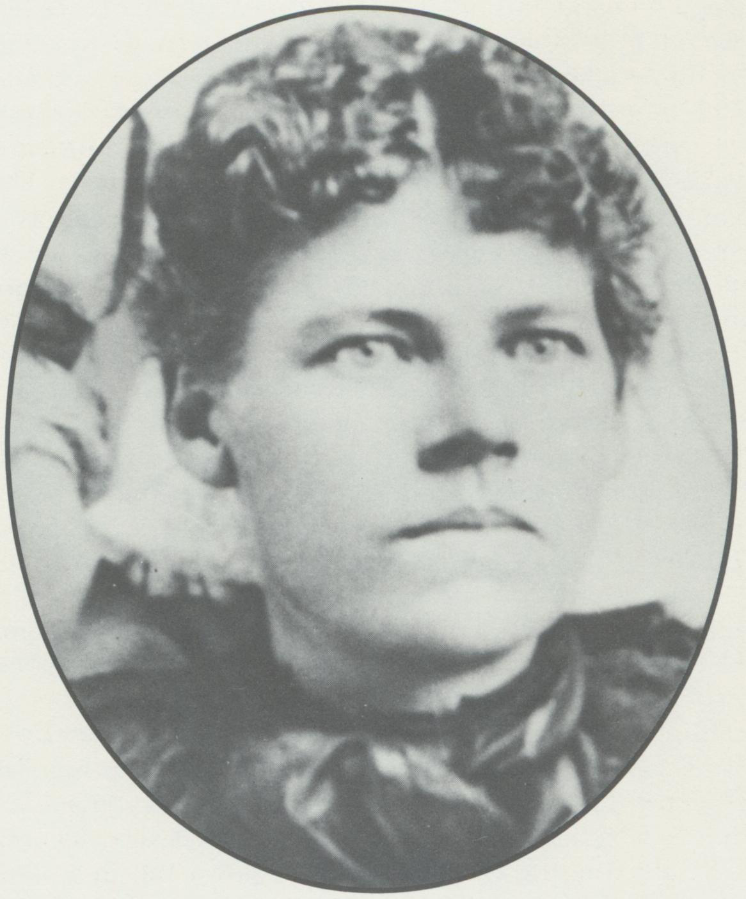
- Cordelia Adams Crawford, c. 1897
- Born: Cordelia Adams; February 27, 1865; Willow Creek, Texas
- Died: February 2, 1943 (aged 77)

Cordelia Adams Crawford (1865–1943) was a pioneer and healer in Arizona. She was known for her generosity to multiple, often conflicting, factions.

== Biography ==
Cordelia Adams was born on February 27, 1865, to Emily and John Adams in Willow Creek, a town near Lampasas, Texas. She was the youngest of five children, a sister named Saphrona, and brothers James Monroe, Andrew Jackson, and Jefferson Davis. John Quincy Adams had been a Confederate soldier and lost his land in Texas due to the war. In 1867, the Adams family joined a wagon train going to California, and peeled off to investigate the new Phoenix settlement. Shortly after arriving in Phoenix, another Crawford child was born.

In 1869, the Adams family continued to California, where they stayed until 1877. John established a cattle ranch. Cordelia went on to marry her father's assistant, Bushrod Foley Crawford on August 8, 1880. Al Sieber served as a witness to their wedding and remained a family friend.

The Crawfords lived at a small ranch. Bush sold cattle in San Diego, so Cordelia regularly managed the ranch. Due to the rural setting, Cordelia delivered her own children Cordelia was skilled in healing, and served her community. She was friendly with the Apache women who would pass through the community, and treat them and their children. This friendship may have saved her ranch during the Battle of Cibecue Creek.

The Crawfords had three children, Nona (August 4, 1881), Oran Sieber (March 14, 1884), and Emily (November 14, 1886).

The Crawfords remained neutral in the Pleasant Valley War. They moved to Tonto Creek. Cordelia managed the Tonto stage stop, where partisans from both sides stopped for food and lodging. Cordelia developed a way to serve the partisans without seeing them, speaking to them through a door. This strategy allowed her to say she had not seen the men in the party. The Crawfords returned to their ranch following the war.

In 1893, the Crawfords moved to Globe, Arizona. There, Bush Crawford killed a saloonkeeper with whom he had a dispute. He was sent to prison for two years, but was pardoned by Oakes Murphy after a year.

Bush died in 1935. Cordelia lived another seven years, dying on February 2, 1943.

== Legacy ==
Crawford was among the first women inducted into the Arizona Women's Hall of Fame in 1981.
