= Placida Garcia Smith =

American educator and social worker

Plácida García Smith
- Born: Plácida Elvira García; August 7, 1896; Conejos, Colorado
- Died: July 17, 1981 (aged 84); Phoenix, Arizona
- Education: University of Utah

Plácida García Smith (August 7, 1896 – July 17, 1981) was an American educator, non-profit director, and community organizer. She was the director of the Friendly House in Phoenix, Arizona, where she helped immigrants and Mexican Americans, especially young women.

== Early life and education ==
Plácida Elvira García was born on August 7, 1896, in Conejos, Colorado. Her paternal grandfather had founded Conejos and her father had worked as a sheriff and probate. Her mother's family, the Espinosas, had been a politically prominent family in New Mexico. As a child, García observed her father's legal work and was impacted by socio-economic disparities.

After graduating as valedictorian from Loretto Academy in Pueblo, Colorado, and earning her certification to teach second grade, García began teaching. During the summers, she studied at Greeley State Teachers College and the University of Mexico. She quickly rose through the school, becoming principal by 1918. In 1921, she became the Conejos County deputy county treasurer.

In 1924, García went to study at the University of Utah, where she earned her bachelor's degree in Spanish language with a minor in sociology on a teaching fellowship. She graduated in 1927 and went on to take graduate work at the University of California, Berkeley. In the summers of 1937 and 1939, García Smith took social work classes at the University of Denver.

== Career ==
García Smith began volunteering as a social worker at the Friendly House, a center that helped immigrants adapt to America, learn English, and train for jobs. In 1931, she became the Friendly House's director when founding director Carrie F. Green resigned due to health issues. García Smith implemented federal relief programs and domestic training classes to create employment avenues for women. During the Great Depression, the federal funding she was able to obtain established the Friendly House as a major relief center.

García Smith helped immigrants, especially women, find jobs and provided childcare for young children. She also helped immigrants obtain citizenship and taught classes herself. Smith spoke with local businesses and governmental agencies and urged them to hire Spanish-speaking employees. Both the public and private sectors began hiring more Spanish-speaking employees.

As the Friendly House director, García Smith also worked with Father Emmet McLoughlin to establish a free clinic for minority women of south Phoenix. They found volunteer staff to provide prenatal and maternity care.

García Smith also helped promote Mexican American culture in Phoenix. In 1932, García Smith organized the first Spanish-American Boy Scout Troop. In 1934, García Smith founded the Mexican Dance Project and helped establish the Mexican Orchestra under the Works Progress Administration.

García Smith also worked to improve Phoenix's infrastructure. In the 1930s, García Smith helped create the Southside Improvement Organization, which worked to secure parks and pools from the government. In 1934, she participated in the Slum clearance project. In 1956, she was named to the Phoenix Parks and Recreation Board.

As director of the Friendly House during the Great Depression, García Smith had coordinated repatriating Mexican families in an effort to address the economic crisis. By 1940, García Smith regretted her part in this work. Having heard about the work of the League of United Latin American Citizens in San Antonio, García Smith, along with journalist Maria García, founded the first League of United Latin American Citizens in Phoenix, LULAC Council 110. García Smith served as the council's first president. In this position, Smith advocated for Mexican Americans in other cities around the United States. In 1941, Friendly House hosted LULAc's national convention. In 1942, García and García Smith garnered support from other Arizona LULAC councils to challenge a public swimming pool's "No Mexicans Allowed" policy. While their efforts were unsuccessful, in 1946, Mexican American veterans convinced the Tempe Chamber of Commerce to withdraw their support of the policy.

During World War II, Gárcia Smith served on the United Service Organizations' board of directors. In 1945, she volunteered as a social worker with the Gila River War Relocation Center. In this position, she helped former internees rebuild their lives.

García Smith retired from the Friendly House in 1963.

== Personal life ==
García married Reginald G. Smith in 1928. That year, they moved to Phoenix, Arizona due to Smith's job. García Smith began working as a substitute teacher in Phoenix. Smith and García Smith had a son together in 1930. Smith died in 1938 of a heart attack, leaving García Smith a single mother.

Plácida Elvira García Smith died July 17, 1981, in Phoenix, Arizona.

== Awards ==
- Daughters of the American Revolution award of merit, 1953
- Phoenix Advertising Club Phoenix Woman of the Year, 1961
- Arizona Women's Hall of Fame, 1982
