= Lucretia Breazeale Hamilton =

American botanist, artist and scientific illustrator (1908–1986)

- Born: Lucretia Breazeale; March 27, 1908; East Falls Church, Arlington County, Virginia
- Died: June, 1986; Pima, Arizona
- Occupation: botanical illustrator
- Years active: 1940–1982
- Known for: cacti and grass illustrations

Lucretia Breazeale Hamilton (1908–1986) was an American botanical illustrator, who was considered an expert on southwestern United States flora. She illustrated numerous technical papers for the University of Arizona and 16 books. She was posthumously recognized with a Desert Willow cultivar named in her honor and induction into the Arizona Women's Hall of Fame.

== Biography ==
Lucretia Breazeale was born on March 27, 1908, in East Falls Church, Arlington County, Virginia. Her father accepted a posting at the United States Department of Agriculture (USDA) Experiment Station on the Pima's Gila River Reservation near Sacaton, Arizona in 1920 and the family moved to Arizona. Two years later, they relocated again to Tucson, where Breazeale completed her schooling, graduating from Tucson High School in 1928. She furthered her schooling minoring in art and majoring in botany at the University of Arizona, earning her BS in 1932. While at university, she met Louis Pennock Hamilton, whom she married in 1935. He was a horticulturist and employed by the Soil Conservation Service, which sent them soon after their marriage to Shiprock, New Mexico. In 1938, they returned to Tucson, where they remained for most of their lives.

Hamilton, who had trained as a botanist, became an illustrator, because she was asked to provide drawings for some of her college professor's scientific articles, due to her detailed renderings. She was considered an expert in southwestern United States botanicals, primarily due to her attention to detail and insistence that the plant be observed through all four seasons for an accurate depiction. In the 1950s, she illustrated a series of publications for the USDA Experiment Station of various plants with the intent of providing detailed images for ranchers to identify various types of grasses based on their nutritional value. Four volumes of range grasses and other flora were printed between 1953 and 1956. Hamilton was requested to participate in the project by local ranchers because her drawings allowed them to identify differences in species. She illustrated many technical books for the University of Arizona and was noted for her drawings of cactii. Few other illustrators were interested in the thorny succulents because of the difficulties involved in drawing their spiny complexity and in handling specimens. Hamilton also preferred to work with live plants rather than dried specimens. In addition to technical materials, she illustrated fifteen books including An Illustrated Guide to Arizona Weeds (1972), written by Kittie Fenley Parker, Grasses of the Southwestern United States (1973), Plants that poison: an illustrated guide for the American Southwest (1979), The Trees and Shrubs of the Southwestern Deserts (1981), and The Cacti of the United States and Canada(1982). Two of her drawings, Opuntia microdasys and Echinocactus horizonthalonius, both of cacti, were selected for the International Exhibition of Botanical Art and Illustrations, held at the Hunt Botanical Library in Pittsburgh in 1973, which featured 181 artists from 29 countries.

Hamilton and her husband were founding members of the Tucson Native Plant Society and she remained active in the organization until her death in June, 1986 in Pima, Arizona. Posthumously, Hamilton was honored with a scholarship named for her granted to qualified students at the University of Arizona; a new Desert Willow cultivar named 'Lucretia Hamilton' her honor in 1998; and was inducted into the Arizona Women's Hall of Fame in 2006.
