= Michele Halyard =

American doctor and activist

Michele Halyard is an American radiation oncologist, academic administrator, and nonprofit organizer. She has been recognized in the field of challenging health disparities in the United States.

== Early life ==
Michele Halyard's mother had breast cancer when Halyard was a child, inspiring her medical career. Halyard graduated from Howard University's BS/MD program in 1984. She then completed her residency in Radiation Oncology at Howard University Hospital. She completed her fellowship at Mayo Clinic College of Medicine and Science.

== Career ==
Halyard joined the Mayo Clinic in 1989. She helped launch the Mayo Clinic Alix School of Medicine's Arizona Campus and served as its first dean. She was also the vice dean of Mayo Clinic Alix School of Medicine. As vice dean, she was responsible for the operational integration of the three medical school campuses in Minnesota, Arizona, and Florida. She led the first-ever three-site accreditation of the medical school by the Liaison Committee on Medical Education. Halyard started the Center for Women's Health on the Arizona Campus and chaired the Department of Oncology. She also served on the Board of Governors, serving as Vice Chair and Chair of the Diversity Committee, and on Mayo's board of trustees

Halyard was involved in Mayo Clinic's antiracism efforts. Having seen a lack of diversity and the negative implications on patient outcomes, she became "one of the most influential and impactful leaders in the movement toward health equity." The Mayo Clinic Graduate School of Biomedical Sciences Student Wellness committee named a lectureship series, featuring speakers from underrepresented backgrounds talking about their careers, after Halyard.

In 2010, Halyard co-founded a nonprofit, Coalition of Blacks Against Breast Cancer, focusing on health disparities. In 2021, she founded the Coalition of Blacks Against Cancer.

Halyard retired from the Mayo Clinic in 2023.

== Personal life ==
Halyard is married to Kevin L. Robinson, the assistant police chief of Phoenix. She has three children.

== Awards ==
- 1996: YWCA Tribute to Women Award
- 2012: Positively Powerful Woman Award
- 2017: Arizona Most Influential Women
- 2019: Phoenix Magazine, The Great 48
- 2020: Arizona Women's Hall of Fame
- February 2022: All of Us Arizona Health Champion
- 2022: Maricopa County NAACP Honororee, Community Health Advocate, with Mr. Marion Kelly
