= Maria Garcia (activist) =

LeMaría García (1898-?) was a journalist and community organizer in the Mexican American community in Phoenix, Arizona.

== Early life ==
García was born in Chihuahua, Mexico, where she studied education at the Autonomous University of Mexico State and taught in Ciudad Juarez. In the early 1930s, she moved to Yuma, Arizona to teach, where she met her future husband, Albert Garcia. Albert was the secretary for the Latin American Club of Arizona, which María soon joined. When Albert earned his law degree in 1937, the couple moved to Phoenix.

== Activism and journalism ==
In 1940, García, with Placida García Smith, founded Phoenix's first chapter of the League of United Latin American Citizens (LULAC), Council #110. She created the council's Discrimination Committee, and led an effort to challenge a Tempe Beach pool that had denied entrance to two Mexican American pilots. Ultimately, the court decided the segregation was unconstitutional, though the Tempe Beach Committee refused to cooperate for three years.

García was also involved in the Friendly House's work. The Friendly House, run by García Smith, was a social service agency that provided English and citizenship classes, as well as other services. García advocated for the Friendly House to be allowed to offer citizenship classes and helped form its Americanization Committee.

In 1941, García wrote an advice column for prominent newspaper El Mensajero. She provided information for mothers and about local organizations helping the community.

Albert García became Arizona's first Hispanic assistant attorney general.

García also worked with the Arizona Voter's League and was the president of Los Amigos Club in Phoenix. During World War II, as Albert served, Maria participated in Committee to Defend America and Women's Division meetings during World War II.

In the late 1940s, the Garcías moved into the Coronado neighborhood, challenging the city's racial restrictions.

== Legacy ==
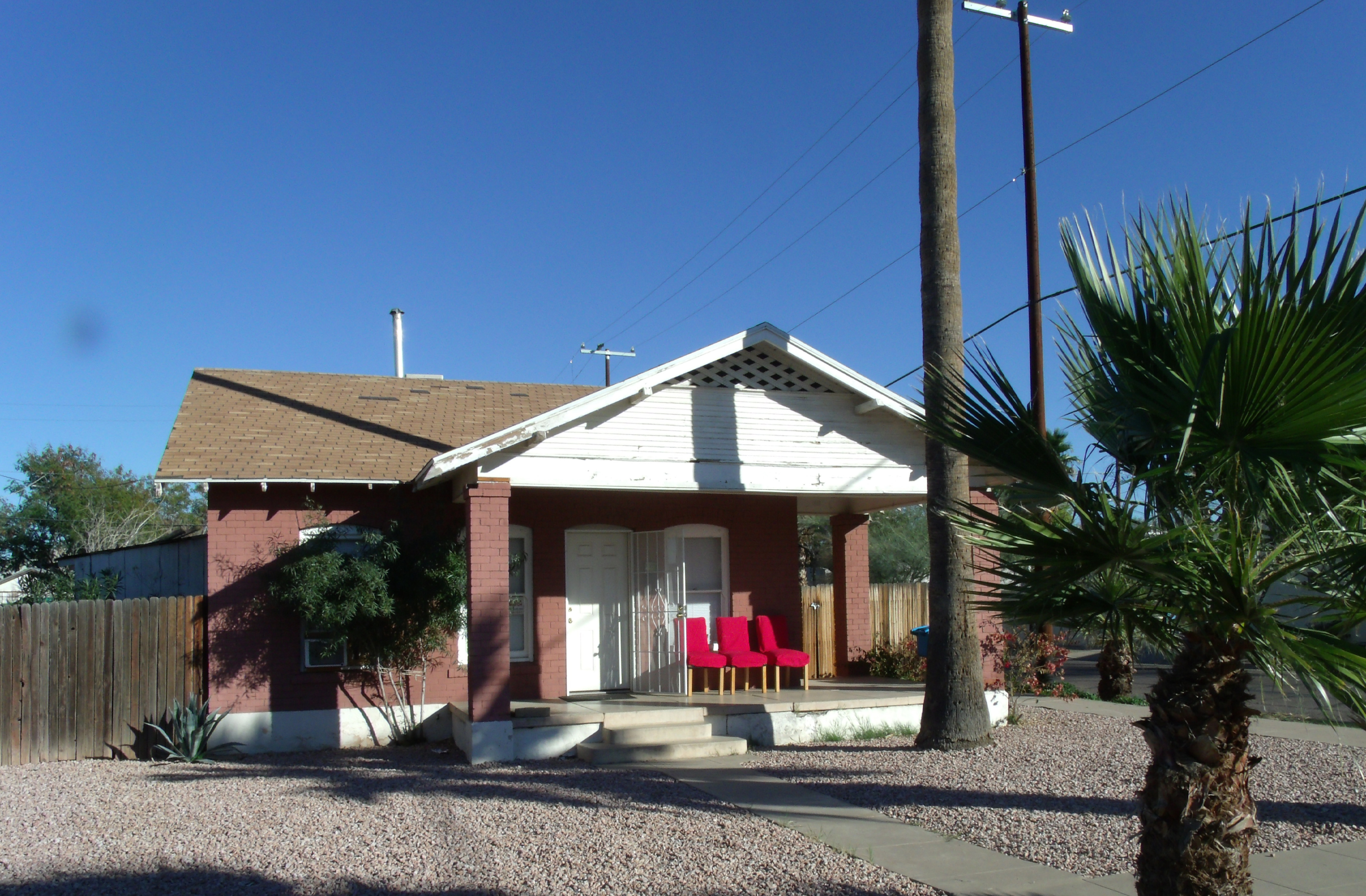
The Albert and Mary García House

In 2018, María García was inducted into the Arizona Women's Hall of Fame.

The García Home is a historic site in Phoenix, though it is known as the Albert and Mary García House.
