= Diana Yazzie Devine =

American nonprofit professional

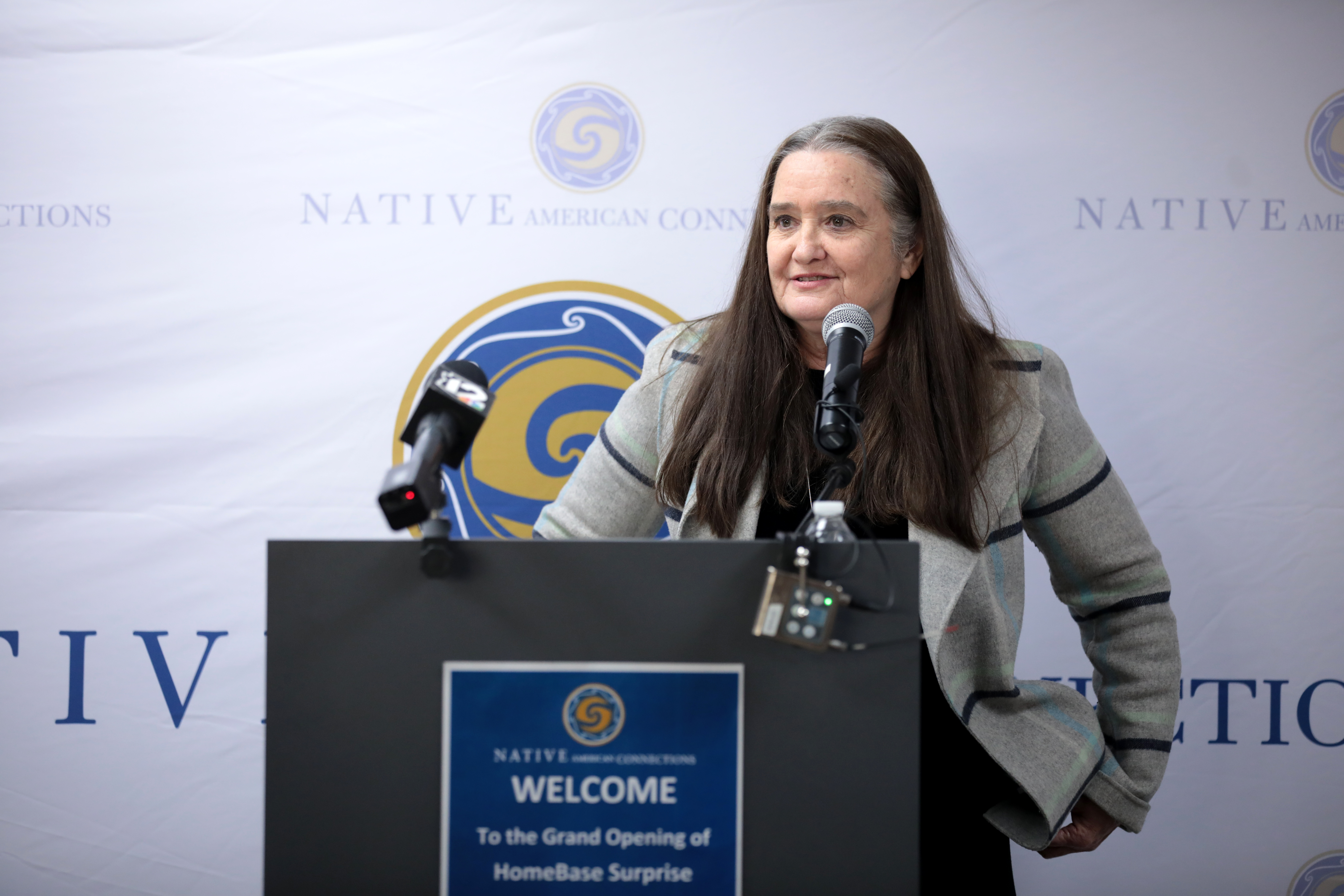
- Diana Yazzie Devine speaking with attendees at the grand opening of Homebase hosted by Native American Connections in Surprise, Arizona.
- Born: Lansing, Michigan
- Education: University of Wisconsin
- Years active: 1975-2023
- Employer: Native American Connections
- Children: 3
- Father: Dan Devine

Diana "Dede" Yazzie Devine is an Arizona-based nonprofit professional. She led the nonprofit Native American Connections for over forty years.

== Biography ==
Devine was born in Lansing, Michigan. As a child, she moved frequently due to her father, Dan Devine's, career as a football coach. She was the middle of seven children.

Devine attended the University of Wisconsin, where she interned on the Ojibwe reservation. She lived and worked there for five years, during which time the Indian-Self Determination Act was enacted. Witnessing the changes that the act gave Devine an understanding of tribal sovereignty and government.

As a part of her work, Devine traveled multiple times to Arizona. In 1979, Devine was introduced to a new residential treatment facility, Indian Rehabilitation. She agreed to help it until a leader could be hired. Under Devine's leadership, Indian Rehabilitation transformed into the nonprofit Native American Connections. As the organization's president and CEO, she greatly grew the organization to support Phoenix's homeless population. She was also active in the founding of the Native American Community Service Center and other services like housing programs. One of the housing communities is named after Devine.

Under Devine's leadership, Native American Connections developed 1,000 affordable Phoenix residences and opened twenty-three Valley projects to provide aid and social services. Greg Stanton noted that "No one has changed as many minds about affordable housing ... in Arizona."

Devine was also influential in transforming the Phoenix Indian School Visitor Center. This former American Indian boarding school became a place for Native Americans from many tribes to come together.

To support her work, Devine earned her MBA from Arizona State University in 1999. She attended the school while running the Native American Connections.

Devine retired in 2023.

== Personal life ==
Devine raised three children as a single mother.

== Awards ==
- 2003: Valley Leadership Woman of the Year
- 2006: ONE (Organization for Nonprofit Executives) Executive Director of the Year
- 2008: YWCA's Tribute to Women - Business Leader Award
- 2010: Foothills Magazine's Women Who Move the Valley
- 2012: Arizona’s 48 Most Intriguing Women
- 2012: Phoenix Business Journal's 25 Most Admired CEOs
- 2016: Community Service Golden Rule Honoree, Arizona Interfaith Movement
- 2019: Morrison Institute's Distinguished Fellows
- 2023: USA Today Women of the Year
- 2023: Local Initiatives Support Corporation Phoenix Special Honoree
- 2023: Arizona Women's Hall of Fame
