= Grace Chapella =

Hopi-Tewa potter (1874–1980)

- Born: February 14, 1874; Hano, Arizona
- Died: 1980 (aged 105–106)
- Other names: White Squash Blossom
- Citizenship: Hopi Tribe of Arizona and American
- Known for: Ceramicist

Grace Chapella (1874–1980) was a renowned Hopi-Tewa potter from a Tewa village and of the Bear Clan.

== Early life ==
Grace Chapella "White Squash Blossom" was born on February 14, 1874, in Tewa Village, Iwinge, on the First Mesa of the Hopi Reservation in Arizona. She was a member of the Bear Clan. As a small child, Chapella learned pottery techniques from her mother, TaTung Pawbe and from her neighbor Nampeyo. Her father, Toby Wehe, was a traditional farmer.

Chapella was part of the first group of children taken to Keams Canyon to attend school there. She married trader Tom Pavatea. While at Keams Canyon, she met and married her second husband, John Mahkewa, with whom she had three children and adopted her deceased sister's four children.

In the early 20th century, Chapella's mother was killed by a falling rock when digging for coal to fire pottery. Her father died shortly after.

== Art career ==
In the early 20th century, Chapella became an accomplished potter. Her off-white pots gained her the name "The White Pottery Lady" and were asked for specifically by tourists. She sold her pottery at the trading post established by Tom Polacca who was also a Tewa from First Mesa. Tom Polacca first encouraged her to sign her work, which was uncommon at the time.

== Personal life ==
In 1927, Chapella became the first Hopi to travel by airplane, when she flew to a pottery demonstration.

From 1917 to 1955, Chapella worked as the cook for the Polacca Day School. Due to the long walk, she built a house near the school, the first non-governmental house in Polacca. Chapella would go on long walks to gather wild greens for food and tea, also collecting pottery shards she found. She would grind smaller shards to use as temper and keep larger shards as inspiration. These larger shards included the rain bird and butterfly/moth; the butterfly is now considered to "belong especially to Grace's family" and is used by several of her descendants in their own pottery.

In 1955 when Chapella retired, the school personnel gave her a water spigot for her yard. At that time, plumbing was not common in Polacca, and Grace was the first person to have running water available at a private home.

== Legacy ==
Chapella was the subject of study by anthropologist Gene Weltfish and ethno-archeologist Michael Stanislawski. Her artwork is part of the permanent collection of the Brooklyn Museum.

Several of her descendants also became potters. Chapella's work has become highly collectable.

In 1988, Chapella was inducted into the Arizona Women's Hall of Fame.
