= María Urquides =

American educator (1908–1994)

- Born: December 8, 1908; Tucson, Arizona, U.S.
- Died: June 16, 1994 (aged 85); Tucson, Arizona, U.S.
- Occupation: Educator
- Years active: 1928–1977
- Known for: Bilingual education proponent, federal education committees
- Notable work: The Invisible Minority (1966)

María Luisa Legarra Urquides (December 8, 1908 – June 16, 1994) was an American educator and proponent of bilingual education. She spent her life in the US state of Arizona, but influenced national educational policies. Urquides served in local and federal roles, and received numerous awards and recognitions for her educational leadership and community work. She has been referred to as the "Mother of Bilingual Education" in the United States. She was inducted into the Arizona Women's Hall of Fame in 2002.

== Early life and education ==
Urquides was born in the Barrio Libre district of Tucson, Arizona, United States. She was the youngest of five surviving children of her parents, Mariana Legara and Hilario Urquides. Three of her siblings died at an early age. Both of her parents came from Tucson families of Mexican descent.

Her father, Hilario, was adopted into an Irish American home after his parents died. Hilario was a founding member of the Alianza Hispano-Americana, established in 1894 to protect Mexicans against disempowerment by White American settlers. At one point, he ran a saloon and owned the Occidental Hotel (previously the Palace Hotel). He later co-founded the Club Demócrato Hispano-Americano (English: Hispanic American Democratic Club) and became involved in local politics. In the early 1900s, he filled multiple city roles, being named constable, deputy sheriff, and town jailer. In 1911, the Tucson mayor assigned Hilario to the last job he would hold, serving for almost three decades as the superintendent of city streets and parks.

During Urquides' early schooling years in Tucson, English was the required language. Students would be punished if caught speaking other languages, as part of a larger Americanization program. While she was at Tucson High School, she earned lead roles in theater productions and operettas. Because of her interests in theater and choir, which were traditionally viewed as Mexican American interests, some of her Mexican classmates labeled her as a "gringacita." During most of her school life she was not allowed to visit her white friends' homes, both because of domestic restrictions on Mexican girls and because she would not be welcomed by white families. While at college, Urquides experienced occupational discrimination, being given jobs cleaning the student residence bathrooms until she could secure work singing at a popular local restaurant, La Casa Vieja.

She earned a teacher's certificate in 1928 at Tempe State Teachers College, which existed from 1925 to 1929 (now Arizona State University), graduating as valedictorian. Urquides credited a high school teacher, Mary Balch, for encouraging her to attend college and become a teacher. She later earned bachelor's and master's degrees at the University of Arizona. Urquides took some additional graduate courses at the University of New Mexico and at the University of California, Berkeley, seeking to enhance her course development skills.

== Teaching career and community work ==
Urquides worked at three different schools during her forty-six-year career as an educator. She taught for the first twenty years at Davis Elementary, a segregated school serving Mexican American and Yaqui children. While she made efforts to enhance student learning and to improve the school grounds, her efforts were largely dismissed or directly rejected. In 1948 she was transferred to Sam Hughes Elementary which served mostly White and economically privileged students. At her new position, she began to directly observe and question the social and economic differences between schools and the corresponding decisions making about educational practices.

Beyond her work in education, Urquides organized local women to improve their community. Organizing with local women, she cleared and improved an unused plot of land to create Oury Park in the Barrio Anita neighborhood (renamed David G. Herrera and Ramon Quiroz Park in 2001). They successfully secured Works Progress Administration funding in order to add a community swimming pool. Several Mexican American women then came together more formally to start a social improvement group, Club Adelante. She led this group to work on projects, including constructing a local library. In 1960, she added her name to a short list of community leaders stumping for Senator John F. Kennedy in the local Spanish newspaper.

== Bilingual education leadership ==
In 1955, Urquides was intentionally recruited to work at the newly established Pueblo High School, where she taught English and worked as a school counselor. At the high school, she was struck by the irony of teaching students Spanish as a foreign language, after years of punishing Mexican and Spanish-speaking students for using a language other than English. She became particularly interested in helping students who spoke Spanish fluently, but were unable to read or write in Spanish. In trying to enhance the use and improvement of both Spanish and English among her students, she worked with Adalberto Guerrero, Rosita Cota, and Henry Oyama to introduce new curriculum ideas including instruction about Mexican American people and culture, a Spanish for Spanish-speakers program, and honors level Spanish courses. In 1965, Pueblo High School was awarded the "Pacemaker Award" for their efforts by the National Education Association's in collaboration with Parade magazine.

While at Pueblo, Urquides became active in broader bilingual curriculum design efforts, as well as national policy development. Following the National Education Association (NEA) support of educational improvements for Black students, Urquides approached Monroe Sweetland (who served as a NEA advisor) to request funding for a study of successful educational and bicultural pedagogies for Mexican American students. Urquides' request was funded and she was appointed to chair the resulting NEA-Tucson Survey Committee. The Pueblo teachers had participated in an Institute for Bilingual Education, and thus were already aware of several effective programs across the southwestern US which used Spanish as an educational asset rather than treating it as a deficit. The committee officially visited fifty-eight schools across the southwest (Arizona, California, Colorado, New Mexico, and Texas) in order to study bilingual education curriculum models. In 1966, they published a widely influential report on bilingual education, The Invisible Minority – Pero No Vencibles. The study outlined the problems facing Spanish-speaking students, and highlighted successful programs in Laredo and El Paso (Texas), Albuquerque and Pecos (New Mexico), Merced, (California), Pueblo (Colorado), and Phoenix (Arizona), as well as their own model in Tucson.

The survey team was making regular trips to the capitol to give testimony in Congress about bilingual education. They also worked with Sweetland to hold an NEA symposium on bilingual education in Tucson. They hosted "The Spanish-Speaking Child in the Schools of the Southwest" at the old Pioneer Hotel after the University of Arizona dismissed its importance and refused hosting. The symposium and The Invisible Minority report helped quickly push federal action, including the introduction and passage of the 1967 Bilingual Education Act. Language educational leaders Herschel T. Manuel and Theodore Anderson attended. Several political leaders attended, including Senator Joseph Montoya (New Mexico), representative Edward Roybal (California), Representative Morris K. Udall (Arizona), and Texas Representative Henry B. González, Senator Ralph Yarborough (Texas). Yarborough and González quickly went on to introduce the national legislation.

Urquides' leadership continues to exert influence on national bilingual education programs. Today, the Tucson model is frequently described as the "cradle" of bilingual education (in Arizona), and Urquides is referred to as the "Mother of Bilingual Education" in the United States. In a 1985 interview, fellow Tucson education leader Adalberto Guerrero recalled that Urquides led all of these efforts, and thus rightly earned her title. In an interview, he reflected, "And who led us by the hand to the meeting with these men from Washington? It had been Maria. And who had been responsible for the symposium to take place here in Tucson? It was Maria. Therefore, we gave her that nickname because it was she who moved and fought in order that bilingual education could become a reality in the United States". (Note: [original: "Y quien nos llevaba de la manita a las juntas con estos hombres de Washington? Fue Maria. Y quien impulso el symposium aqui en Tucson? Maria fue. Asi es que a ella le hemos dado ese sobre nombre por tanto que tuvo que moverse para que al acto de la educacion bilingue se hiciera una realidad en los Estados Unidos"].)

Urquides officially retired from teaching in 1978. She continued to work with numerous organizations until her death in 1994. Urquides was buried at the Holy Hope Catholic Cemetery & Mausoleum.

== Selected service and recognitions ==
Several US presidents appointed Urquides to educational roles. In 1950, Harry S. Truman appointed Urquides to the White House Conference on Children and Youth, and a decade later Dwight D. Eisenhower reappointed Urquides. In 1970, Richard M. Nixon asked her to once again serve on that committee. In 1966, President John F. Kennedy appointed her to the State Advisory Committee to the Civil Rights Commission. At the request of the Lyndon B. Johnson administration, Urquides joined the National Advisory Committee to the Commissioner of Education on Mexican-American Education.

In recognition of her service, Urquides received awards and recognitions from her community, national and regional organizations, and state universities. In 1977, a local elementary school designed to serve disabled students was named in honor of Urquides. She was the first Mexican American woman to have a school named after her in the state of Arizona. University of Arizona Education awards the Maria Urquides Laureate Award each year to faculty committed to bilingual education. The Mexican American Student Association at the University of Arizona provides annual scholarships in her name.

Her personal and family story was published in the book This Land, These Voices. That same story was reprinted in Arizona Memories, which shared memoirs from prominent Arizonans. Urquides appeared in a profile feature within the textbook The Story of the Mexican Americans, written by renowned Mexican American historian Rudy Acuña.

During her lifetime, Urquides served on vast number of community service and educational organizations, including:

- American Red Cross
- Arizona Association of Mexican American Educators
- Arizona Congress of Parents and Teachers
- Arizona Council for Civil Unity
- Arizona State Board of Public Welfare (as chair)
- La Frontera Center
- National Association for Advancement of Colored People
- National Council of Christians and Jews
- Pima Community College Board of Governors (as founding chair)
- Tucson Education Association
- Tucson League for the Public Schools
- Tucson League of Mexican American Women
- YWCA

== Selected awards ==
- Arizona Women's Hall of Fame in 2002.
- Distinguished Citizen Award (1972), University of Arizona Alumni Association
- Distinguished Service Award (1970), National Education Association
- Hall of Fame Award, Profiles of Success Hispanic Leadership, State of Arizona (2000)
- Honorary law degree (1983), University of Arizona
- Human Relations award (1968), National Education Association
- Las Doñas de Los Descendientes del Presidio de Tucson, League of Women Voters of Greater Tucson
- "Maria Urquides Center," chosen for the multi-purpose room at the La Frontera Center's Tucson Clinic
- Medallion of Excellence, Arizona State University
- Medallion of Merit (1984), University of Arizona
- Pioneer Award (1990), National Association for Bilingual Education
- Woman of the Year (1965), League of Mexican American Women (Los Angeles)
- Woman of the Year in Education (1965), Tucson Daily Star
- YWCA Lifetime Achievement (1989)
