= Kittie Fenley Parker =

American botanist (1910–1944)

- Born: Kittie Lucille Fenley; December 3, 1909; Arkansas, US
- Died: September 9, 1994 (aged 84); San Diego, California
- Other names: Kittie Lucille Fenley Parker
- Occupations: Botanist, educator
- Spouse: Kenneth William Parker (married 29 October 1932)
- Parent: Mother: Molessa Odelia Turner Father: James Morris Fenley
- Relatives: Zelda Margaret Fenley, Werta Jean Fenley, John Morris Fenley

Kittie Fenley Parker (1910–1994) was a botanist for the National Museum of Natural History and author of An Illustrated Guide to Arizona Weeds.

== Biography ==
Kittie Lucille Fenley was born on December 3rd, 1909 in Arkansas, US. She lived in Holtville, Imperial, California, United States in 1920 and Tucson, Pima, Arizona, United States in 1937. She attended the University of California, Berkeley and earned her PhD from the University of Arizona in 1946. She began her teaching career at the University of Arizona's School of Agriculture where she taught from 1949 through 1953. She went on to teach botany at the George Washington University in Washington, D.C. until her retirement in 1979. She was a research associate at the National Museum of Natural History from 1959 through 1989 where she identified hundreds of Mexican and South American Asteraceae collections. Parker was a member of the Botanical Society of Washington and the Potomac Chrysanthemum Society as she specialized her research in Hymenoxys and Tertaneuris - both of Asterceae variety.

In 1972, Parker published An illustrated guide to Arizona weeds which was illustrated by Lucretia Breazeale Hamilton.

Parker died in San Diego, California on November 9, 1994.
