= Hattie Greene Lockett =

American writer

- Hattie Greene Lockett, from a 1937 newspaper
- Born: Hattie Myrtle Greene; August 25, 1879; Bushnell, Illinois, United States
- Died: May 19, 1962 (aged 82); Phoenix, Arizona, United States
- Occupation(s): Writer, anthropologist, rancher, clubwoman

Hattie Myrtle Greene Lockett (August 25, 1879 – May 19, 1962) was an American writer, rancher, and clubwoman. She was inducted into the Arizona Women's Hall of Fame in 1987.

== Early life ==
Hattie Myrtle Greene was born in Bushnell, Illinois, the daughter of William Greene and Hattie Wallace Greene. The family moved to Scottsdale, Arizona when she was in her teens. She trained as a teacher at Bushnell Normal School and Tempe Normal School.

== Career ==
Greene taught school in Arizona as a young woman. She was founder and first president of the Washington Woman's Club in Phoenix in 1912, and she organized the Tucson Junior Women's Club. When her husband died in 1921, she took charge of the family sheep ranch. She attended National Wool Growers Association meetings, won awards for her prize sheep, and worked with the United States Forest Service on grazing reform.

In 1932, after her children were grown, she earned a master's degree in anthropology at the University of Arizona; her thesis, later published as a book, was titled "The Unwritten Literature of the Hopi: First Hand Accounts of Customs, Traditions and Beliefs of the Northern Arizona Indian Tribe".

In her later life, Lockett was primarily a writer and speaker. She published poems and short stories, and served a term as president of the Arizona chapter of the League of American Pen Women. She was also president of the Flagstaff Writers Club, active in the Phoenix Writers' Club, and the founder of Arizona Poetry Day and a related statewide contest. She served on the national advisory board of the General Federation of Women's Clubs.

== Publications ==
- "To a Desert Flower" (1926)
- The Unwritten Literature of the Hopi (1933)
- "Prayer for Today" (1955)

== Personal life and legacy ==
Greene married Henry Claiborne Lockett, a widowed rancher with three children, in 1905. They had two sons, Claiborne (Clay) and Robert. Her husband died in 1921. After years of living with Parkinson's disease, Lockett died in 1962, at the age of 82, at a rest home in Phoenix.

In 1978, her son Clay Lockett established the Hattie Lockett Awards at the University of Arizona, presented annually to three undergraduates "who demonstrate great promise as poets."

== Awards and honors ==
- 1952: Honor roll of the American Artists and Professional League
- 1978: Hattie Lockett Awards established at the University of Arizona
- 1987: Arizona Women's Hall of Fame
