= Christine Kajikawa Wilkinson =

American academic administrator

Christine Wilkinson
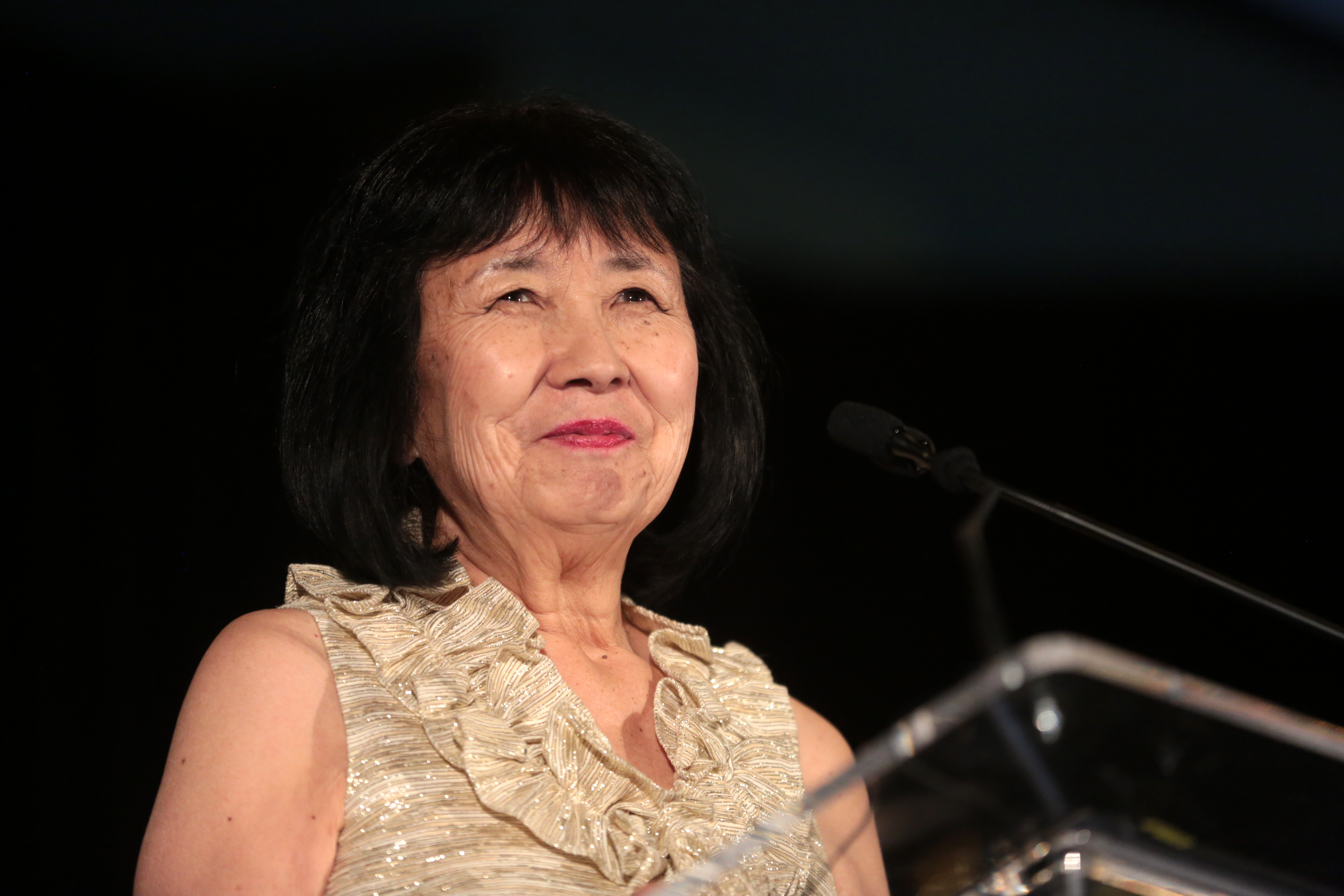
- Born: Christine Kajikawa; Utah
- Education: Arizona State University; University of California, Berkeley
- Father: Bill Kajikawa

Christine Kajikawa Wilkinson is an academic administrator at Arizona State University. She is the school's first female minority vice president and the first person in the position of secretary of the university.

== Biography ==
Christine Kajikawa was born in Utah during World War II. Her father was Bill Kajikawa, who had been the head basketball, baseball, and football at Arizona State University. Her mother, Margaret, was a banker and very community centered. She grew up in Tempe, Arizona.

Kajikawa earned her Bachelor of Arts in education with distinction from Arizona State University in 1966, receiving the Outstanding Female Graduate Award. She earned her Master of Arts in education, counseling psychology from University of California, Berkeley, and returned to Arizona State University for her Doctor of Philosophy in higher education administration.

Wilkinson was invited back to ASU to help rebuild student activities and spirit after morale had dropped during the yearlong expansion of the Memorial Union. She continued her career at ASU, working alongside four university Presidents and in eighteen different positions

Wilkinson is senior vice president and Secretary at Arizona State University, making her the highest ranking female executive at the university.

She is also the CEO and president of the ASU Alumni Association. She is also faculty in the school's Division of Educational Leadership and Innovation at Mary Lou Fulton Teachers College. She served as ASU's interime athletic director three times and as vice president of student affairs.

Wilkinson is also involved in volunteering, including serving as trustee for the ACT corporation and being a charter member of the commission on student recruitment and retention.

== Awards ==
- Arizona State University Award of Merit
- ASU Alumni Achievement Award
- Council for Advancement and Support of Education's Crystal Apple Award, for excellence in teaching
- 2020: Community Impact Award, Big Brothers Big Sisters of Central Arizona
- 2019: Corporate Leader of the Year, Asian Corporate and Entrepreneur Leaders
- 2018: Don Carlos Humanitarian Award, Tempe Community Council
- 2017: Most influential Women in Business, AZ Business Magazine
- 2017: Arizona Women's Hall of Fame
- 2016: Golden Saguaro Award, Japanese American Citizens League
- 2015: Who's Who in Business, Arizona Republic
- 2014: Tempe Business Women of the Year, Tempe Chamber of Commerce
- 2012: Arizona's 48 Most Intriguing Women, Arizona Centennial Legacy Project
- 2009: Woman of the Year Award, Valley Leadership

== Selected publications ==
- Swanson, Roger M.; Wilkinson, Christine Kajikawa (1993). Training new admissions recruiters : a guide for survival and success. Washington: Council for Advancement and Support of Education. ISBN 978-0-89964-299-4. OCLC 988767855.
