= Angela Hutchinson Hammer =

American newspaperwoman (1870–1952)

- Born: Angela Hutchinson; November 30, 1870; Virginia City, Nevada
- Died: April 9, 1952; Phoenix, Arizona
- Occupation: Newspaperwoman
- Notable work: Casa Grande Dispatch

Angela Hutchinson Hammer (Nov. 30, 1870 – April 9, 1952) was an American newspaperwoman. She was born in 1870, and entered the newspaper industry in the late 1890s. Hammer founded several newspapers, the most prominent being the Casa Grande Dispatch. Hammer has been inducted into both the Arizona Newspaper Hall of Fame and the Arizona Women's Hall of Fame in 1983.

== Early life ==
Angela Hutchinson was born to William Tallentyre and Sarah (née O'Higgins) Hutchinson on November 30, 1870, in Virginia City, Nevada. As William was a mine engineer operating stamp mills, the family frequently moved around. As mines dried up and after Angela's brother Joseph, the only boy in the family, died in a tragic accident, William went to Arizona looking for new opportunities. In 1879, he settled in Picket Post, where he worked as a blacksmith. In 1881, Sarah and their youngest child, Monica, joined him. Angela and her other three sisters lived at a convent in Virginia City. In 1883, after troubles with the Apaches decreased, Angela and her sisters moved to Arizona to join their parents. The Hutchinsons continued to move around, living in Silver King and Wickenburg, Arizona. In the late 1880s, the family moved to Phoenix, Arizona. While in Phoenix, Hutchinson worked for the Phoenix Republican, folding fliers for the newspaper and learning to set type.

In 1889, Hutchinson earned a teaching certificate from Clara A. Evans Teachers’ Training College. As she was Catholic, it was difficult for her to find a teaching position. She was finally hired to work in Wickenburg, which had isolated schools and poor accommodations that had a poor attrition rate. and taught in Wickenburg from 1889 to 1890 and again from 1894 to 1896. From 1890 to 1893, she worked in the newspaper industry, being employed by Dunbar's Weekly, the Phoenix Gazette, and the Arizona Republican. From 1893 to 1894, she taught at Gila Bend, Arizona.

In 1896, Hutchinson married Joseph S. Hammer, and had three children, Louis "Louie" (1897), William "Bill" (1899), and Marvin (1902). She divorced Joseph Hammer in 1904 and received a $500 divorce settlement.

== Career ==
In 1905, Hammer year bought her first newspaper, the Wickenburg Miner for $250 from another female publisher. However, she learned that the list of advertisers and subscribers were inflated, making the paper less valuable. She was able to make the paper prosper by using a bartering system as payment for ads and copies of the paper. In 1906, she purchased a competing paper, the News-Herald from Eli S. Perkins.

For two years (from 1908 to 1910), Hammer worked on establishing her newspaper company, publishing the Wickenburg Miner, Swansea Times, Bouse Herald and Wenden News from a plant in Congress Junction. Each town had its own front page attached to the regular issue of the Miner. Every week, Hammer would ride the train, distribute papers, collect news and gossip to publish, and reboard to go to the next town.

Hammer worked to improve Wickenburg's reputation. The town held a cleanup day, and Hammer used her newspaper to help create a town library. Hammer backed the Woman's Christian Temperance Union in an effort to dry up Wickenburg, which had many saloons. Her opinionated editorials led to threats being made against her and her press. After Wickenburg voted the saloonkeepers out and with Wickenburg arguing over incorporation, Hammer returned to Phoenix. In 1911, she turned the paper over to her printer and opened Hammer & Sons Print Shop in Phoenix. Louis and William, now teenagers, worked as pressmen and general managers.

In 1913, in order to better assist Ted Healey with publishing the Casa Grande Bulletin, she moved the plant from Congress Junction to Casa Grande. The two argued over a water rights issue, disrupting their partnership. Hammer learned that Healey was making derogatory remarks about her ability to run a newspaper and had plans to steal her newspaper equipment. Overnight, she and her sons hid the printing press in a horse barn, leaving the plant empty except for the subscription list that Healey had brought into the partnership for his half of the business. On January 1, 1914, Hammer founded the Casa Grande Dispatch, housed in the barn. Three years later, Hammer purchased the Bulletin, but went into default at the start of World War I. She closed the paper in 1918 and restarted it two years later.

Hammer decided to sell the Dispatch in 1924, as none of her sons were interested in running the paper.

In 1925, the Messenger Printing Company was founded, consisting of all Hammer's newspaper holdings. Hammer ran the company with her sons Bill and Marvin. The following year, she purchased the Phoenix Messenger, changing the name to the Arizona Messenger.

In 1938, Hammer's son Louis's wife died. Hammer left the business to her other sons and returned to Casa Grande to take care of Louis's two children.

In 1951, Messenger Printing Co. merged with Arizona Printers Incorporated. Hammer was put on the board of the combined company.

== Community work ==
Hammer was heavily involved in her communities throughout her career. She was known as "a champion of the women's suffrage movement," and used her newspapers to challenge governmental corruption. Hammer was an officer in the Phoenix Business and Professional Women's Association, which supported her political efforts.

In 1915, Hammer began working as Pinal County's immigration commissioner. In 1918, Hammer unsuccessfully ran to be the Pinal County representative.

In 1922, Hammer was Pinal County's delegate to the 1922 Democratic state convention.

In 1938, Hammer received an appointment to the Arizona State Board of Social Security and Welfare by Rawghlie Clement Stanford. She remained in this position until 1943.

== Death and legacy ==
Hammer died on April 9, 1952 in Phoenix.

In 1965, Hammer was the first woman inducted into the Arizona Newspapers Hall of Fame. In 1983 Hammer was inducted into The Arizona Women's Hall of Fame.

In the 1940s, Hammer began writing her memoirs. Though she never published them, in 2005, her granddaughter, Betty Hammer Joy, published a biography of Hammer based on the memoirs.

== Sources ==
- Joy, Betty E. Hammer (2005). Angela Hutchinson Hammer: Arizona's pioneer newspaperwoman. Tucson: University of Arizona Press. ISBN 978-0816523573. OCLC 57750209.
