= Vernell Coleman =

American community organizer (1918–1990)

Vernell Myers Coleman
- Born: Vernell Myers; August 28, 1918; Henderson, Texas, U.S.
- Died: March 27, 1990 (aged 71)
- Known for: Community leader and reviver of Phoenix's Juneteenth celebration

Vernell Myers Coleman (August 28, 1918 – March 27, 1990) was a community organizer in Phoenix, Arizona. She was known as "Mother Coleman" and the "mayor" of the Matthew Henson Projects. She is remembered for reviving the celebration of Juneteenth. In 1990, she was the first African American woman inducted into the Arizona Women's Hall of Fame.

== Biography ==
Vernell Myers was born in Henderson, Texas on August 28, 1918, to Berta and Roberts Myers. Her parents owned a restaurant and ran a laundry business at their home. Myers helped at the laundry and began working as a housekeeper at twelve years old. She was also active in the Mount Hebron Baptist Church in her adolescence, serving as a Sunday school teacher, choir director, and choir organizer.

In 1938, Myers moved to Phoenix to help her sick sister. She began working at the First Colored Baptist Church (later renamed the First Institutional Baptist Church). After Myers's sister graduated in 1941, Myers returned to Texas, where she married Clifford Coleman. Three years later they moved back to Phoenix.

The Colemans had four children. It is unclear what happened to Clifford, but in 1953, Vernell and her children moved into the Matthew Henson Housing Project. Vernell was unable to hold a full-time job due to severe arthritis, so she took in ironing and other small tasks. She also rejoined the First Institutional Baptist Church, where she helped with fundraisers and served as secretary of the Pastor's Aid Society until she had to stop due to her arthritis.

Due to the crime and poor living conditions in the housing project, Coleman worked to improve the community. She organized a tenants' council and served as its president for ten years. She aimed to improve the relationship between the community and the police and was instrumental in breaking barriers.

In 1969, the Matthew Henson Neighborhood Council confronted the Housing Authority with charges of neglect, due to deteriorating apartments, roach infestations, a lack of maintenance, inflexibility surrounding rent, a lack of racial integration, and the racial prejudice of housing staff. In 1970, Coleman organized a successful tenant strike to improve living conditions in the apartments. Ten years later, the Phoenix Human Resources Department director praised her for bringing issues with city housing project administration to light.

In 1970, Coleman was instrumental in creating the Matthew Henson Community Center, which was later named in her honor.

Coleman organized Juneteenth and Black History Month activities in Phoenix. Recalling the large Juneteenth celebrations in Texas, Coleman brought the tradition back to Phoenix. Phoenix had celebrated the holiday in the past, with its first celebration attended by Booker T. Washington. Although she had attended a small celebration in 1938, the tradition died in the mid-1940s. Coleman began a Juneteenth celebration for the Mathew Henson Housing Projects in 1968. The first celebration was small, held at the Dunbar School, with food prepared by the senior residents, and a small baseball team challenging the local police team.

In 1978, Coleman, frustrated with watching her neighbors benefit from her work without contributing themselves, resigned as president of the Mathew Henson Housing Project tenants' council. The council soon disbanded. However, Coleman made a committee to continue organizing the Juneteenth celebration. She guided the growth of the event, making sure it was an interracial celebration. She eventually created the nonprofit Juneteenth Tradition, Inc. to plan the event. In 1980, Juneteenth Tradition, Inc. expanded its mission to raise scholarship money for underprivileged students. Coleman served as the honorary chairwoman of Juneteenth Tradition, Inc. until shortly before her death.

Coleman was involved with many other projects, including serving as a commissioner on the Leadership and Education of the Advancement of Phoenix (LEAP), sitting on the board of directors of the Phoenix Urban League and the City of Phoenix Housing Advisory Board, serving as chairwoman and treasurer for the Phoenix Human Resources Department, and campaigning for needed services. She also expanded her work making dinners for the elderly in her housing project into the St. Mary's Food Bank.

Coleman died on March 27, 1990.

== Awards and honors ==
- 1974: Phoenix Woman of the Year, Greyhound Corporation
- 1979: Willie L. Robertson Memorial Human Rights award, Spiritual Assembly of the Bahai's of Phoenix
- 10th Annual Hon Kachina, Luke's Men of St. Luke's Medical Center and KPNX-TV of Phoenix
- Woman of Distinction, Woman of Achievement Group
- February 15, 1988: Spirit of Arizona
- 1990: Arizona Women's Hall of Fame
- 2001: exhibit honoring Coleman's legacy held at the Phoenix Museum of History
- A recreation center, the Vernell Coleman Recreation Center, is named in her honor.
