= Terri Cruz =

Teresita del Niño Jesús "Terri" Cruz (1927–2017) was a community advocate and a founder of Chicanos Por La Causa.

== Early life ==
Teresa Cruz was born in Tucson, Arizona. Her parents were from Hermosillo and Durango. She was orphaned as a young child and raised by her aunt and uncle in Salt River Valley. After eighth grade, she left school and worked as a house cleaner. She began working with her local community by campaigning for John F. Kennedy. After twenty-two years, she decided to earn her GED and pursue a career in social services for the poor.

== Career ==
Cruz worked with a War on Poverty program. While in that position, she was approached by Chicano activists, including Joe Eddie Lopez, asking to use the spirit duplicator. She became involved with their group, which became Chicanos Por La Causa (CPLC). Cruz helped found Chicanos Por La Causa (CPLC) in 1969. Cruz served on CPLC's Board of Directors until she was hired by the organization.

In 1970, she as instrumental in organizing a boycott against Union High District in which 2,000 Mexican American students refused to attend, leading to reforms including hiring more Latino teachers and counselors.

Cruz worked at CPLC until her death in 2017.

== Personal life ==
Cruz had eight children.

== Awards ==
- 2023: Arizona Women's Hall of Fame
- 2012: Arizona Latina Trailblazer
