= Guess Eleanor Birchett =

American naturalist (1881–1979)

- Born: Guess Eleanor Anderson; March 28, 1881; San Antonio, Texas, U.S.
- Died: January 30, 1979 (aged 97); Tempe, Arizona, U.S.
- Occupations: Self-trained ornithologist and naturalist
- Spouse: Joseph T. Birchett
- Awards: Arizona Women's Hall of Fame (1989)

Guess Eleanor Birchett (March 28, 1881 – January 30, 1979) was an American self-trained ornithologist and naturalist. She was known as "the Bird Lady of Tempe". In 1989 she was inducted into the Arizona Women's Hall of Fame.

== Biography ==
Guess Eleanor Anderson was born in San Antonio, Texas. She was the fourth of ten children in the family of George and Elizabeth Anderson. She originally traveled to Tempe, Arizona in 1903 to visit her sister, Honor Anderson Moeur, wife of future Arizona Governor Benjamin Baker Moeur (1869–1937). She soon met Joseph T. Birchett (1875–1953) and married him in 1904.

Joseph and Guess Birchett established residence in Tempe. Joseph Birchett would later serve as a director of the Tempe National Bank and as Mayor of the City of Tempe.

Guess Birchett was a charter member of the Tempe Woman's Club and served as its vice president in 1915. Birchett began studying ornithology in 1940. She is estimated to have banded 5,000 birds in her 30 years as a self-trained ornithologist. The United States Fish and Wildlife Service designated her home as a federally-recognized bird sanctuary from 1940 until 1970, and Birchett ran educational programs for children there. She wrote for regional publications such as Western Bird Banding Magazine. Birchett was also active in founding the Desert Botanical Garden in Phoenix, Arizona, and she a charter member of the Tempe Garden Club, William Bloys Post #2 American Legion Auxiliary, Tempe Historical Society, and the Tempe Art League, and served on the Tempe Beautiful Board.

Birchett died during 1979 in Tempe. Both she and her husband were buried at Tempe Double Butte Cemetery.

== Awards and honors ==
- 1971: Centennial Queen for Tempe's centennial celebration
- 1979: Birchett home recognized by the National Register of Historic Places
- 1989: Arizona Women's Hall of Fame
