= Helene Thomas Bennett =

American bacteriologist, businesswoman (1901–1988)

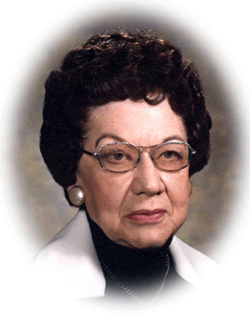
- Born: July 5, 1901; Raton, New Mexico
- Died: April 27, 1988 (aged 86)
- Known for: bacteriologist and businesswoman

Helene Thomas Bennett (July 5, 1901 – April 27, 1988) was an American bacteriologist and businesswoman who worked in Arizona. She opened the Yuma Clinical Laboratory in 1926, in Yuma, Arizona, which became the second largest medical laboratory in Arizona. She was posthumously inducted into the Arizona Women's Hall of Fame in 2011.

== Biography ==
Helene Alberta Thomas was born near Raton, New Mexico and was the eldest of three children of John Bertie Thomas and Catherine Helen (Wendell) Thomas. Her father was the engineer on the Atchison, Topeka and Santa Fe Railway. When her father was killed in a railroad accident, her family moved to Kansas and later Jasper, Missouri. She received a degree in chemistry from the University of Kansas in 1922, followed by a master's degree in bacteriology. In 1926 she came to Yuma and established the Thomas Laboratory, one of the leading chemical laboratories in western Arizona. She also have a laboratory at El Centro, California.

In 1926 she married attorney Ray Crawford Bennett with whom she had three children. She was widowed in 1944.

Helene Thomas Bennett was a founding member of the Arizona Public Health Association and the Yuma Soroptimist Club. In 1953, she successfully ran for the Yuma School Board, becoming the first woman to serve in that position.

Bennett was the second woman in Yuma to get her pilot's license, and joined the Civil Air Patrol.

Bennett died in 1988.
