= Eulalia Elias =

American rancher (1788–1865)

- Born: Doña María Eulalia Elías González Romo de Vivar; February 12, 1788; Arizpe, New Spain
- Died: August 6, 1865 (aged 77)
- Occupation: Rancher

Doña María Eulalia Elías González Romo de Vivar (February 12, 1788 – August 6, 1865) was a Mexican American rancher who established the first major cattle ranch in Arizona. She was inducted into the Arizona Women's Hall of Fame.

== Biography ==
The Elías González family, of which Eulalia was a part, was descended from her grandfather, Captain Francisco Elías Gonzalez, a native of La Rioja, Spain. The family was very powerful in the colonial era of Sonora and Arizona, and included a president of Mexico, two governors of Sonora, a governor of Chihuahua and several priests of the church in Mexico.

Eulalia Elías was born on February 12, 1788, in Arizpe. Her father, José Francisco Antonio Elías González Díaz del Carpio, held 30 large land grants and thousands of acres. On July 1, 1827, she applied to purchase land along the Babocómari Creek. Later that year, she and her brother Don Ignacio received a grant for about 54 miles (87 km) along the creek. Called San Juan de Babocómari (later renamed to San Ignacio de Babocómari), the siblings began to bring in large amounts of livestock and purchase more land, eventually reaching 130,000 acres around Sierra Vista. The deed to the additional land was granted on December 25, 1832, and immediately construction was begun on a 15 feet (4.6 m) walled fort. The land grew into the first major cattle ranch in Arizona, holding 40,000 head of cattle and horses in 1840. The ranch prospered until the death of two of Eulalia's brothers in Apache Indian raids. By 1849, the family abandoned the ranch and moved back to Arizpe.

Eulalia Elías, who never married, played a large role in managing much of the financial and land prospects of her family.
