= Mary Bernard Aguirre =

American educator (1844–1906)

Mary Aguirre
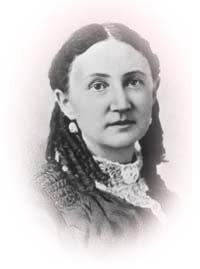
- Born: Mary Bernard; June 23, 1844; St. Louis, Missouri, United States
- Died: May 24, 1906 (aged 61); San Jose, California
- Occupation: Educator

Mary Bernard Aguirre (June 23, 1844 – May 24, 1906) was a public schoolteacher and instructor at the University of Arizona.

== Early life ==
Bernard Aguirre was born in St. Louis, Missouri. She was the daughter of a wealthy merchant, Joab Bernard (1800–1879) and Arabella Mather Bier Bernard (1816–1899). For the first twelve years of her life the family resided in Baltimore, Maryland, the birthplace of Mary's mother. In 1856 the Bernard family moved to Westport, Missouri, where Mary's father owned a large store.

Bernard Aguirre went to college at the age of seventeen; this would prove to be a critical period of her life, as she lived through many moments that eventually changed her views towards people of other races. She heard the rifle shot that killed abolitionist John Brown in Harpers Ferry, West Virginia.

When Mary Bernard returned home from Baltimore, Maryland later that same year, the American Civil War broke out, and she became a supporter of Southern secession.

== Personal life ==
Mary Bernard married a Mexican freighting contractor, Epifanio Aguirre, on August 21, 1862 in Westport. The Aguirres had three sons: Pedro, (born 1863), Epifanio Jr. (born 1865) and Stephen (born 1867).

Bernard Aguirre's family moved to the Southwest in 1863. They traveled from Missouri to Las Cruces, New Mexico, with a stop in Santa Fe. Mary kept a journal of her family's travels across the Great Plains. In August 1869, the Aguirres set foot in Tucson. In January 1870, Epifanio Sr. was killed during an Apache raid of a stagecoach near Sasabe, Arizona. In economic straits, Bernard Aguirre saw herself forced to return home to Missouri and live with her parents.

== Career ==
In 1874, Mary Bernard Aguirre returned to Tucson, having accepted a job as a teacher in Tres Alamos. She taught in Tucson-area public schools, including the Tucson Public School for Girls, for four years. During this time, Bernard Aguirre advocated for public education against the prevailing inclination among Catholics towards homeschooling.

In 1878, she became the first teacher in Arivaca, sixty miles south of Tucson; during her tenure she was recruited to teach at the fledgling University of Arizona.

She became chair of the Spanish language and English history departments at the University of Arizona in 1885. She was the university's first female professor, and resigned from the post in 1901. In 1906, Mary Bernard Aguirre was injured in a Pullman train crash in California. On May 24, 1906, two weeks after the accident, she died of internal injuries.

== Legacy ==
- To honor her work during the early years of the school, the University of Arizona currently awards a Women's and Gender Studies professorship in Aguirre's name.
- In 1983 she was inducted into the Arizona Women's Hall of Fame.

== Other sources ==
- Leo Banks (2001) Stalwart Women: Frontier Stories of Indomitable Spirit (Arizona Highways) (ISBN 0-916179-77-X)
- Annette Gray (2004) Journey of the Heart: The True Story of Mamie Aguirre (1844-1906), A Southern Belle in the Wild West (Graytwest Books) ISBN 978-0973546705
