= Bullion Plaza School =

- U.S. National Register of Historic Places
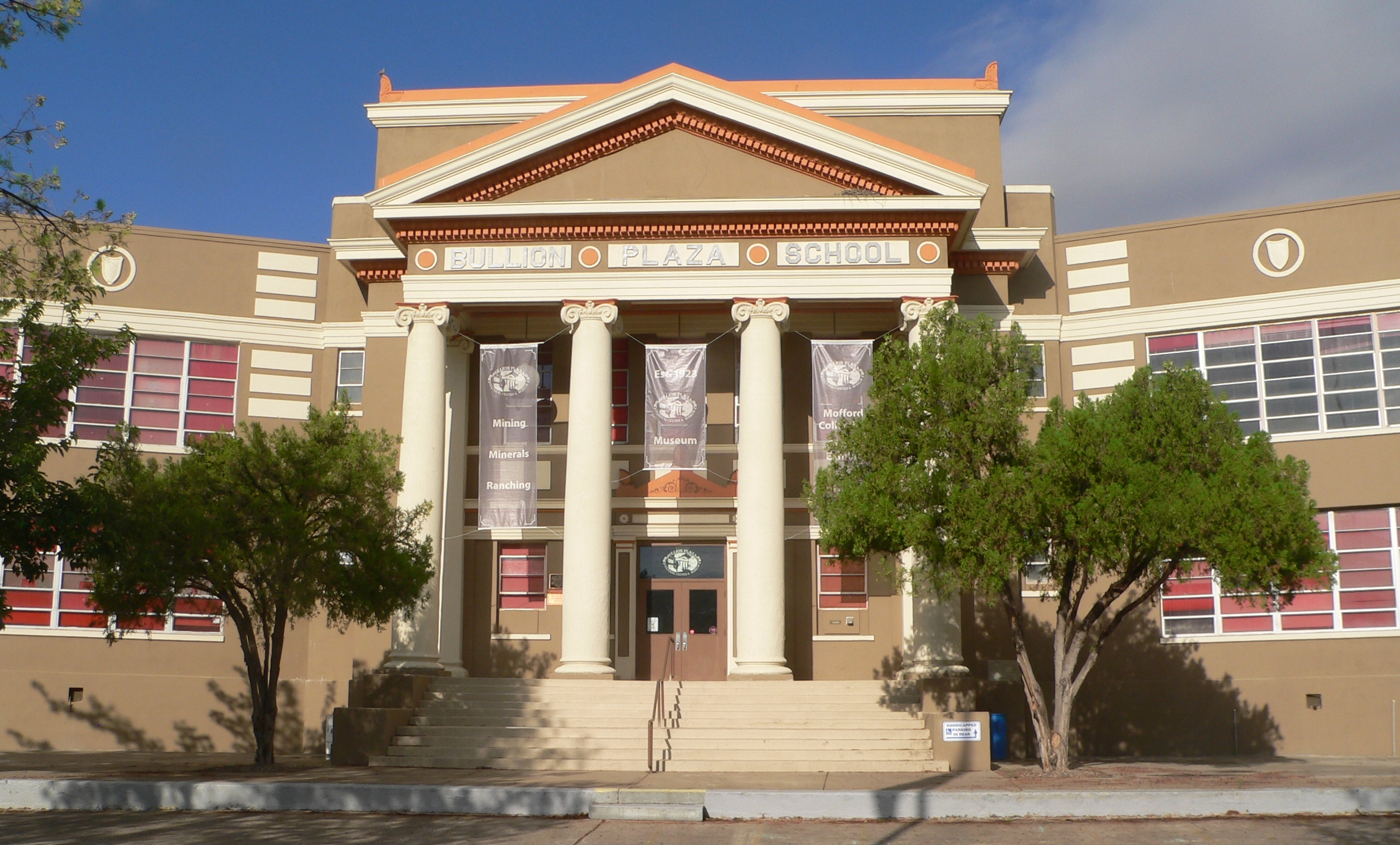

- Location within Arizona
- Location: 150 N. Plaza Circle Drive, Miami, Arizona
- Coordinates: 33.39403°N 110.87951°W
- Area: 2 acres (0.81 ha)
- Built: 1923
- Built by: R.A. Ramey Construction Co.
- Architect: Trost & Trost
- Architectural style: Classical Revival
- NRHP reference No.: 00001591
- Added to NRHP: January 4, 2001

The Bullion Plaza School, at 1000 Plaza Ave. in Miami, Arizona, was designed by architects Trost & Trost in Classical Revival style and was built in 1923. It served as a school from 1923 to 1994 and was listed on the National Register of Historic Places in 2001. It now is the Bullion Plaza Museum.

It was deemed significant "for its association with the history of Mexican Americans and school segregation in Arizona, and ... as an example of late Neoclassical Revival architecture in public buildings in Miami."
