= Clare Dunn (nun) =

Nun and pioneer politician in Arizona (1934–1981)

Sister Clare Dunn

Member of the Arizona House of Representatives from the 13th district
- In office 1974–1981 Serving with Bruce Wheeler (1974–1976), Larry Hawke (1976–1981)
- Preceded by: H. Thomas (Tam) Kincaid
- Succeeded by: David M. Rodriguez

Personal details
- Born: 1934
- Died: July 30, 1981 (aged 46–47)
- Party: Democratic

Clare Dunn (1934 – July 30, 1981) was an American teacher and Catholic nun who served in the Arizona House of Representatives. She advocated for voting rights and social justice. She was a Democrat. She advocated for the Equal Rights Amendment. In 2017 she was inducted into the Arizona Women's Hall of Fame.

== Early life ==
Dunn joined the Congregation of St. Joseph of the Apparition in 1955. She earned her Bachelor's and Master's degree in Political Science. In 1965, the Los Angeles Congregation Sisters of Saint Joseph assigned her to go to Tucson, Arizona to teach history and government at Salpointe Catholic High School, a position she held for nine years.

== Political career ==
In 1972, Dunn entered politics by volunteering for the George McGovern presidential campaign, serving as an Arizona delegate for McGovern at the 1972 Democratic National Convention.

In 1973, Dunn began requesting permission from her church superiors to run for office. Although they initially refused, concerned about blurring lines between church and state, in 1974, she received their permission. She ran on a platform of social issues and good government, which was relevant in the wake of Watergate. That year, she was elected to the Arizona House of Representatives to represent District 13 in Tucson.

During her first year, Dunn introduced twenty-nine bills and cosponsored nine others. Much of her work dealt with the passage of the Equal Rights Amendment, education, and helping the poor, elderly and marginalized.

While in office, she worked to increase access to voting, supporting voting by mail, restoring voting rights to freed prisoners who met sentencing and parole requirements, and requiring ballots to be written in easy-to-understand language.

Dunn co-sponsored a bill establishing a Martin Luther King Day holiday, which happened years after her death.

Dunn was re-elected three times. She became the assistant minority leader for the Arizona House of Representatives.

== Death and legacy ==
Dunn and an assistant, Sister Judith Lovchik, were killed on July 30, 1981 by a drunk driver going the wrong way on Interstate 10 in a head-on collision. Her funeral was attended by Governor Bruce Babbitt and over 1,300 mourners. In a 1982 legislative session, one of her colleagues said that Dunn was the "conscience of the legislature."

Shorter after Dunn's death, Arizona legislators passed stricter penalties against drunk driving.

In 1983, the Vatican prohibited nuns and any Catholic religious from running for political office, making Dunn one of the last nuns to hold public office.

In 2017, Dunn was inducted into the Arizona Women's Hall of Fame.
