= Sarah Herring Sorin =

American attorney (1861–1914)

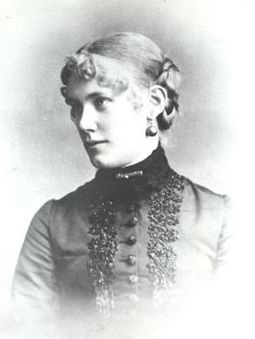
- Born: Sarah Herring; January 15, 1861; New York City
- Died: April 30, 1914 (aged 53); Globe, Arizona
- Occupation: Attorney
- Spouse: Thomas Sorin (m. 1898)

Sarah Herring Sorin (January 15, 1861 – April 30, 1914) was Arizona's first woman attorney and the first woman to try a case in front of the United States Supreme Court unassisted by a male attorney. Sorin practiced law with her father William Herring in the firm "Herring & Sorin" initially in Tombstone, Arizona, and later in Tucson. After her father's death, Sorin moved to Globe, Arizona, where she became the attorney for the Old Dominion Copper Company and United Globe Mines. Sarah Sorin is a member of the Arizona Women's Hall of Fame.

== Early life in New York City ==
Sarah Herring Sorin was born in New York City on January 15, 1861, to Colonel William and Mary Inslee Herring. The Herrings had five children: Sarah, Howard, Bertha, Henrietta, and Mary, from oldest to youngest. Her father, Colonel Herring, had graduated from Columbia Law School and later became Deputy District Attorney in New York City and served in the New York State Legislature.

Sarah finished high school in New York and then went on to obtain her teaching credentials. She taught school in New York City while her brother Howard attended high school. By this time Sarah and Howard were the only members of the family left in New York. Through a series of events, the rest of the family had moved far west to the city of Tombstone in the Arizona Territory.

== From New York to Tombstone ==
In 1880, William Herring ventured to the Arizona Territory to settle the estate and evaluate various mining holdings after inheriting mines from his brother. He decided to work the claims located in Bisbee through his newly formed Neptune Mining Company that was funded by East Coast money. In 1880, the rest of the Herring family moved out west to Bisbee Canyon to join Colonel Herring, excluding the two oldest, Sarah and Howard. Colonel Herring eventually ceased his mining aspirations and established himself as an attorney for mining companies.

When Sarah and Howard Herring moved west in 1882, the Herring family was now residing in Tombstone. The city was still reeling from the October 1881 Earp-Clanton shoot-out at the O.K. Corral. Not long after her move west, Sarah became the first woman schoolteacher in Tombstone. In her ten years at the school, she also had stints as school librarian (1891) and principal (1884–1886).

== Legal training ==
Possibly inspired by her brother, Howard's, death, Herring left her teaching job and studied law under her father, also studying in New York City. In December 1892, she passed the oral examination to become a lawyer. On January 12, 1893, the Supreme Court admitted Sorin as a lawyer, establishing her as the first female lawyer in the state of Arizona. She then enrolled in New York University School of Law, where she earned her L.L.B. with honors in 1894. She returned to Tombstone, where she joined her father's practice and specialized in mining law.

Her first case before the Arizona Supreme Court, Seaverns v. Welch, was in 1896 when she represented a mining company and won the case for her client.

== Relocation to Tucson ==
In 1896 the Herring family left the declining Tombstone area and moved north to the thriving city of Tucson, Arizona.

Herring married rancher and newspaperman Thomas Sorin on July 22, 1898, in her family's home in Tucson. Sarah was 37 and Thomas was fifteen years older. Thomas Sorin was a successful miner who, like many others, had left his mining operations in Tombstone to focus on other areas in Arizona. Thomas Sorin, who was renowned for his mining expertise, represented the Arizona Territory mining industry at the Columbian Exposition in Chicago in 1893. Family oral history claims that the Sorins had a stillborn early in their marriage. They had no other children.

Between 1906 and 1912, Herring & Sorin largely worked on cases involving mining companies. While Sorin and Herring argued on opposite sides of the courtroom in McElwee v. Tombstone Mill and Mining Company, they generally collaborated. They also gave lectures about their work at schools and churches. In 1912, Sorin took over the firm when Herring died.

== U.S. Supreme Court cases ==
On April 16, 1906, Herring applied for his daughter's admission to the United States Supreme Court. Sorin became the 24th woman ever to be admitted. Sorin first appeared before the U.S. Supreme Court in October 1906 in the case of Taylor v. Burns,. Herring made the final arguments. Herring & Sorin won the case for their client, Thomas Burns. The opinion was delivered by Justice Brewer.

Her next appearance involved mining tax issues. In an opinion delivered by Justice Oliver Wendell Holmes, they lost their argument. The case did lead to mining companies pushing for statutory revisions to tax laws, which led to the enactment of the Bullion Law, which Herring & Sorin drafted.

Sarah's third appearance before the nation's highest court occurred after her father's death. Sorin was helping her attorney brother-in-law Selim M. Franklin on a title case that was argued before the court.

Her fourth case was her landmark case, Work v. United Globe Mines, where she became the first woman to argue a case, unassisted and unaccompanied by a male attorney, on November 6, 1913. The written brief presented to the court was solely in Sarah's name, and she gave the final arguments by herself. Her accomplishment was noted in many newspapers, including the New York Times.

On January 5, 1914, Chief Justice White rendered the Court's decision in favor of Sarah and her client, United Globe Mines.

== Last days and recognition ==
After her father's death in 1912, Sorin moved her practice to Globe, Arizona, closer to the Sorin Ranch. Sorin was the corporate counsel for both the Old Dominion Copper Company and the United Globe Mines, which was part of the Phelps Dodge mining empire.

Not long after her triumph in the U.S. Supreme Court in January 1914, Sorin travelled to Tombstone to deal with her father's estate. Shortly after, she fell ill. Sorin died of pneumonia on April 30, 1914, in Globe, with her husband at her side. A ceremony was held in Tucson at her sister's home. Her obituary was carried on the front page of several newspapers and a special resolution was prepared by the Arizona State Bar Association. Both Sarah and Thomas Sorin are buried at Evergreen Cemetery in Tucson.

In 1985 Sarah Herring Sorin was admitted into the Arizona Women's Hall of Fame.

In 1999, the Arizona Women Lawyers Association created an annual Sarah Sorin Award.

== See also ==
- Women in the United States judiciary
- Sandra Day O'Connor
- Belva Lockwood – pioneer woman attorney in Washington DC
- Clara Shortridge Foltz – pioneer woman attorney in California

== Notes and references ==
- New York Times, Nov 6, 1913, "High Court Hears Woman"
- Arizona Historical Society Library, Tucson, Arizona
- University of Arizona Special Collections Library, Record Book I
- Arizona Women's Hall of Fame Pamphlet 1984
- "Women Lawyers in the United States," Lelia J. Robinson, The Green Bag, Vol. II, 1890
- "Western Women Defenders," 2000, Barbara Allen Babcock
- Tombstone's Early Years, John Myers Myers (1880–1881)
- Laws, Courts, and Lawyers Through the Years in Arizona, James M. Murphey (p. 156)
- A Historical and Biographical Record of the Territory of Arizona, George Roskrug (1896), p 309
- 1884 Arizona Business Directory and Gazetteer
- "Sarah Herring Sorin: Arizona's First Woman Lawyer," Jacquelyn Gayle Kasper, Western Legal History (1999)
- Memoirs of an Arizona Judge, Richard E. Sloan (1932)
- A History of Phelps Dodge 1834–1950, Robert Glass Cleland (1952)
- Arizona Daily Star, May 1, 1914, Nov 22, 1892 and others
- Arizona Weekly Star, Jan 21, 1893 and others
- Tombstone Daily Prospector, January 15, 1893, November 1891, and other issues
- Tombstone Epitath, November 1892, January 1893, and other issues
- "The Beginnings of the Tombstone School 1879–1893", Matia McClelland Burk, Arizona and the West, Vol. 11, no. 3
- Tucson Daily Star, July 22, 1898 and other dates
- The Old Dominion Mine, Clara Woody
- Work v. United Globe Mines (1913), Transcript of Record
- Arizona Record, May 1914
