= Rebecca Dallis =

American educator (1896–1971)

- Born: December 21, 1896; Connersville, Indiana, U.S.
- Died: February 13, 1971 (aged 74)
- Education: Swift Memorial College

Rebecca Dallis (December 21, 1896 – February 13, 1971) was an American educator and activist for the education of African American children.

== Biography ==
Rebecca Huey was born on December 21, 1896, in Connersville, Indiana. Dallis married William Curtis Dallis in 1923. In 1924, she graduated from Swift Memorial College with a Bachelors of Arts and an Elementary Teaching. In 1929, she moved to Phoenix with her husband, where he operated a funeral home. By 1932, she was a teacher in Mobile, Arizona, a largely African American community. Dallis returned to school, earning her Master of Arts in education from the University of Arizona in 1935. She was one of the first African American women to earn a master's degree from the school.

In 1935, the Casa Grande community built a separate, segregated school for the children of African American cotton laborers moving to the city. In 1939, Dallis took over as the teacher of Southside Colored Grammar School. She taught between forty and seventy students between kindergarten and eighth grade, for a third of the pay of the white teachers and in poor conditions. She taught home economics in her own home, due to the lack of school facilities for the subject. Dallis and her husband also supported students after eighth grade, teaching them from her front porch to make sure they were able to graduate high school and enter college. When she learned students needed to know Spanish to enroll in college, she ordered a correspondence course and learned it with her students.

Dallis and her husband also taught in Stanfield, Arizona, where the school was named for her father, William Huey. W.C. Dallis continued to teach there after she started teaching at the Southside Colored School, eventually becoming principal. Dallis also taught piano to children in Casa Grande and played piano at weddings and funerals.

In 1952, Casa Grande built a larger segregated school, East School. Dallis was appointed head teacher at the new school.

Seeing Dallis's work with limited resources, a white farm woman and clubwoman, Louise Henness, began advocating for integration. In 1960, after desegregation, Dallis was named principal of the school. Dallis was made to retire in 1962 due to mandatory retirement guidelines, though she may have continued to teach in Stanfield. Realizing a need for support for families with children with special needs, Dallis went to Arizona State University to take courses on the subject. Dallis then joined the staff of the Trinity Southern Baptist Church's Spero School to help developmentally disabled children.

Dallis died on February 13, 1971.

== Legacy ==
In 1992, the Southside Colored School, where Dallis had taught, was relocated onto the Casa Grande Valley Historical Society and Museum's grounds and renamed the Rebecca Dallis Schoolhouse.

Dallis was named one of Arizona’s notable women honored in the history project “Making a Difference: Arizona Women Building Communities, 1900-1980.”

In 2017, Dallis was inducted into the Arizona Women's Hall of Fame.
