= Jessie Benton Evans =

American artist (1866–1954)

Jessie Benton Evans (24 March 1866 – 1954) was an artist known for depicting the Arizona landscape and supporter of the arts. Evans earned a degree from the Chicago Art Institute in 1904 and exhibited at the Art Institute of Chicago's annual exhibitions before moving to Italy, where she exhibited at the Paris Salon and the Paris Internationale. In 1911, Evans returned to the United States and settled in Scottsdale, Arizona where her home became a meeting place for artists and she held weekly salons. Her work is held in the collections of numerous notable institutions.

== Biography ==
Jessie Benton Steese was born in Uniontown, Ohio, on March 24, 1866, to Jacob and Amanda Steese. She began studying painting as a child, beginning her official study at Oberlin College. She also made frequent trips to Europe, where she studied art.

On August 12, 1886, Steese married Denver Evans, a fruit importer. She went on to earn a degree from the Chicago Art Institute in 1904, where she studied under William Merritt Chase, Albert Herter, Lawton S. Parker, and Frank Duveneck. From 1905 to 1925, Benton exhibited at the Art Institute of Chicago's annual exhibitions.

For several years, Benton lived in Italy, where she studied under Vitore Zanetti Zilla in Venice. In 1911 and 1912, she showed her art at the Paris Salon and the Paris Internationale.

In 1911, for health reasons, the Evans family moved to Scottsdale, Arizona. She built an Italian-style villa at the base of Camelback Mountain. Her home became a meeting place for artists of many disciplines. She held weekly salons to support the arts. Evans painted oils and watercolors of the Southwestern landscape, showing her work in European and American venues.

Evans's work was collected by many institutions. Notably, the Santa Fe Railroad collected more works by Evans than any other woman.

== Awards ==
- Phoenix Municipal Exposition, first prize
- Arizona Women's Hall of Fame, 1989
