= C. Louise Boehringer =

American politician; superintendent of schools (1878–1956)

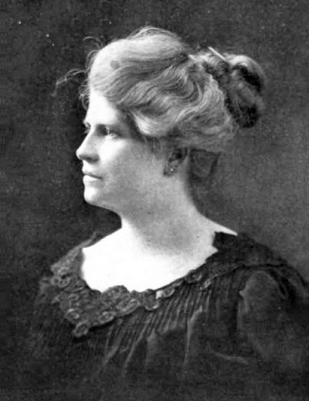
- Born: Cora Louise Boehringer; 1878; Morrison, Illinois
- Died: September 11, 1956 (aged 77–78); Seattle, Washington
- Occupation: Educator
- Known for: First female superintendent of schools in Yuma County, Arizona

Cora Louise Boehringer (1878 – September 11, 1956) was an American educator who was the first female superintendent of schools in Yuma County, Arizona. She has been called "the mother of the Arizona educational system". In 2008 she was inducted into the Arizona Women's Hall of Fame.

== Early life ==
Cora Louise Boehringer was born in Morrison, Illinois, the daughter of Jacob F. Boehringer and Louise Greenawald, immigrants from Germany.

Boehringer attended primary school in St. Louis, Missouri. In 1902 she graduated from DeKalb Normal School in DeKalb, Illinois. She then attended teacher colleges in Illinois and Missouri. She studied and received degrees from Columbia University (B.S. in education, 1911), Columbia Teacher's College (professional certification in elementary supervision, 1911) and California State University at Berkeley (M.A. in education, 1930).

== Career ==
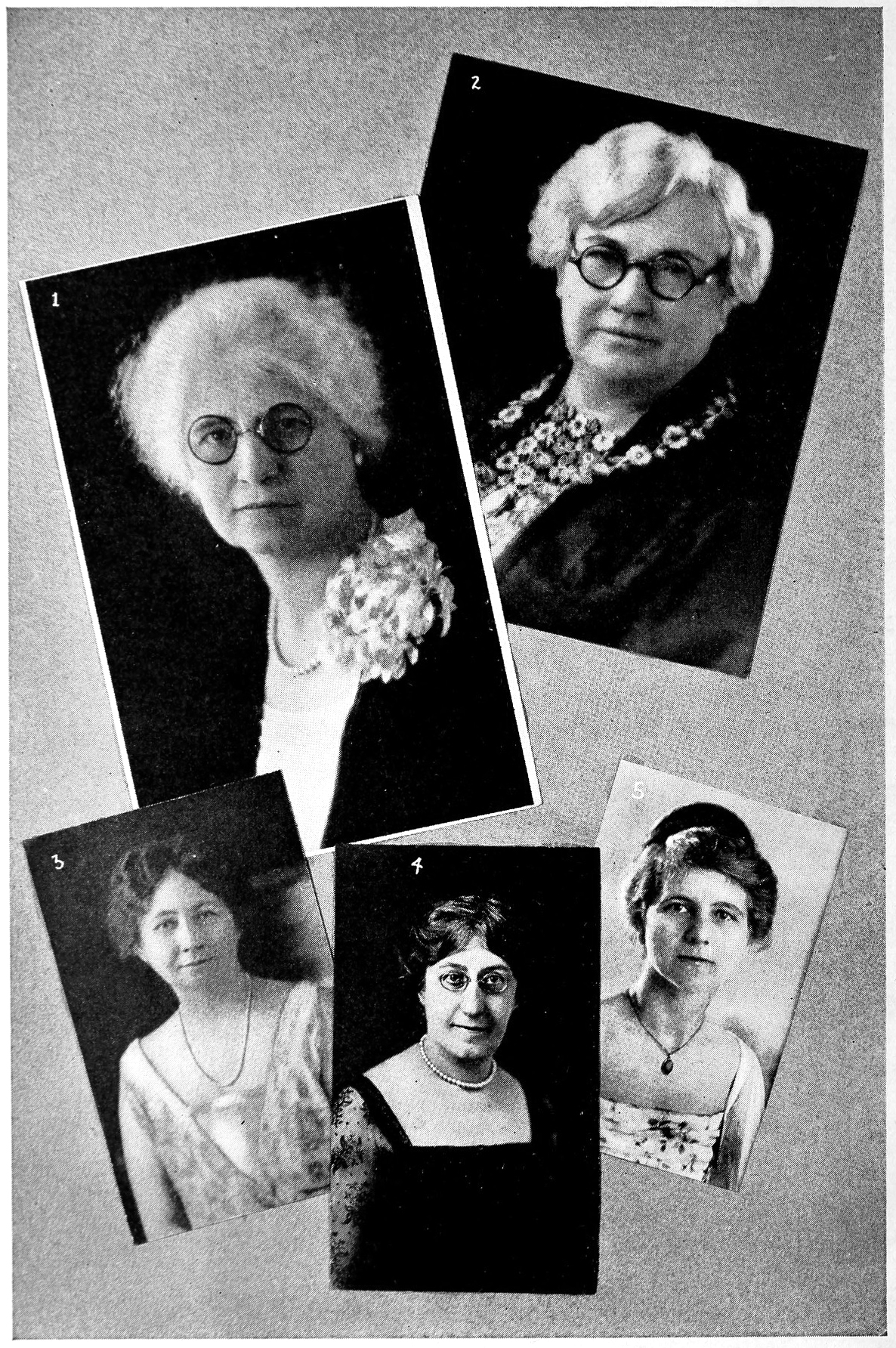
1) C. Louise Boehringer, 2) Mattie L. Williams, 3) Maie Bartlett Heard, 4) Margaret Wheeler Ross, 5) Edith O. Kitt

Boehringer held several positions as instructor in Illinois and Missouri: director of the Normal Department, Illinois Normal School, Geneseo, Illinois; director of the State Normal School in Cape Girardeau, Missouri; faculty member at the University of Missouri (1904); organizer of the Mississippi Normal School (1907); and superintendent of the Training School for Teachers, Springfield, Illinois (1912). In this period she wrote for the Missouri State Courses of Study for Rural and Village Schools.

While in the Midwest, Boehringer participated in the women's suffrage movement.

In 1913, Boehringer was elected County Superintendent of Schools in Yuma, Arizona, the first woman to hold such an elective office in Arizona, a position she held until 1917. She became president of the Arizona Council of Administrative Women in Education, an organization of female education workers, such as high school principals, department heads, and county school superintendents.

In 1916, 1922 and 1940, Boehringer ran for Arizona Superintendent of Public Instruction, but was unsuccessful because the school superintendent was on the state Parole and Pardons Board and the majority of voters was not comfortable with the idea that women could decide on the fate of criminals.

In 1917, Boehringer attended the University of Illinois to take journalism courses and became an educational journalist. She then bought the Arizona Teacher Magazine and served as its editor until 1939, when she turned over ownership of the magazine to the Arizona Education Association. She was editor of the Arizona Patent–Teacher Bulletin, the National Altrusian, and Arizona Geography, and a free-lance writer on education and pioneer women. She was vice president of the Arizona National League of American Pen Women, for which she organized the Arizona branches in Phoenix and Tucson. She contributed to Women in the Southwest and Biographies in Arizona Historical Review. She was chairman of educational broadcasts for the Arizona Department of Public Instruction.

In 1921 and 1922, Boehringer served in the Arizona House of Representatives as a Democrat. She also served as chair of the Committee on Education, established the State School Board, created per capita funding for schools, and legitimized children born out of wedlock. In 1933 she was appointed director of curriculum for the Department of Education, a position she held for six years. In 1934 she was appointed president of the Arizona Parent-Teacher Association.

In 1926 Boehringer was legislative chairman for the Arizona Federation of Women's Clubs. In 1919, she organized and was the first state president of the Arizona Federation of Business and Professional Women's clubs in 1921 and served a second term as state president in 1924. In both positions, she helped working women to network and advocated for equal pay and education.

Boehringer was involved in many other organizations:

- Professor at Northern Arizona University, summer classes.
- State Chairman of Better Homes in America, appointed in 1928 by Herbert Hoover.
- Member of American Association of University Women.
- Member of National Education Association (N.E.A.), in 1913 she spoke at their convention in San Francisco.
- Founder of the State Council of Administrative Women in Education in 1915.
- Chairman of the College Woman's Drive for Food Conservation, Arizona, in 1917.
- Secretary of the Arizona State Teacher's Association, 1919.
- Member of Altrusa International, Inc.
- Member of Delta Kappa Gamma

== Personal life ==
In 1912 C. Louise Boehringer moved to Yuma, Arizona, joining her brother, George, and parents who had moved there in 1909, claiming a 40-acre ranch and establishing a dairy farm.

When in 1940 Boehringer lost for the third time in the run for State Superintendent of Public Instruction, she retired from public life and in 1953 she moved to Washington with her sister-in-law.

She died in Seattle on September 11, 1956, and is buried at Evergreen Washelli Memorial Park, Seattle.
