= Teatro Carmen =

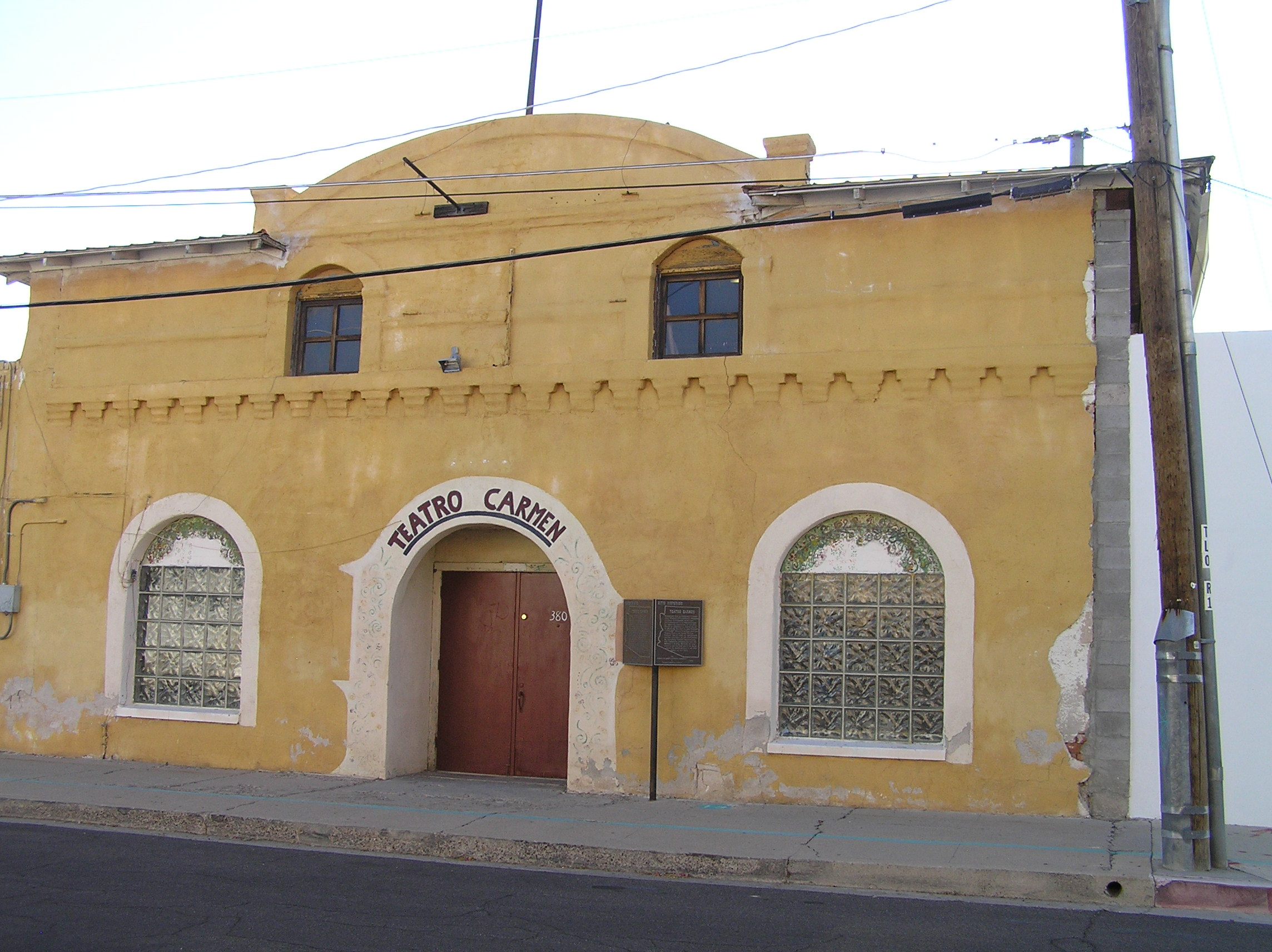
- Interactive map of the Teatro Carmen area

General information
- Architectural style: Sonoran mission
- Location: 380 S Meyer Ave, Tucson, AZ 85701
- Coordinates: 32°12′58.4454″N 110°58′24.6678″W
- Year built: 1915
- Renovated: 2021-
- Owner: Stratford Art Works, Inc.

Design and construction
- Architect: Manuel Flores

Renovating team
- Renovating firm: Poster Mirto McDonald

Website
- https://teatrocarmen.org/

The Teatro Carmen was Tucson's first Spanish-language theater. From 1915 until it closed in the 1920s, it was the foremost theater for Spanish-language productions and a community center for Tucson's Mexican community. It is in the Barrio Viejo neighborhood.

== Creation and theater ==
In 1914, Ricardo Vasquez gifted the land Teatro Carmen stands on to his wife, Carmen Soto de Vasquez. This land had been in his family since 1883. Soto de Vasquez built a theater on that land, Teatro Carmen. She hired Manuel Flores to build the theater. The building is in the Sonoran mission style.

Teatro Carmen opened on May 20, 1915, with a performance of Teresa Farias de Isassi's Cerebro y Corazon. With 1,400 seats, it was the largest theater in town. It became an important cultural center for Tucson Spanish speakers and expanded to include a cinema, boxing arena, and ballroom.

The theater was most active from 1915 to 1922. It presented a variety of performances, attracting Mexican society. The Carmen hosted some of the most important touring acts, including Virginia Fábregas, María del Carmen Martinez, María Teresa Montoya, and Cuadro Novel. The theater also had its own company, made of defectors from the Compañía Nacional and the Compañía Turich.

== Sale and later uses ==
In the 1920s, movies and boxing matches drew more Spanish-speaking crowds than Zarzuelas and other performances like those at Teatro Carmen. In 1920, the theater closed for several months. The next year, the theater opened a boxing ring and was closed by city authorities. Though the authorities cited poor accommodations and emergency exits for large crowds, El Tucsonense accused them of discrimination.

The theater remained open until 1922. A poor showing for the María Teresa Montoya company led to the building's use as a dance hall. Nine years after the theater's creation, Soto de Vasquez moved to Nogales with her family. In 1926, Soto Vasquez sold the building to Elena Cervantes. In 1927, the structure became a garage.

The building was later purchased by the Black Elks. It housed the Elks-Pilgrim Rest Lodge #601 from 1937 to 1986. It then was used as the Borderlands Theater from 1987 to 1989. It was later used as a workshop and storage warehouse.

== Restoration ==
In the 1990s, Kelley Rollings purchased Teatro Carmen, hoping to restore it. The Rollings family restored much of the Barrio Viejo neighborhood in an effort to save it from urban renewal. They used the empty theater to store architectural salvage. However, Rollings died before he was able to restore the theater.

In 2021, Stratford Art Works, Inc. purchased Teatro Carmen for $940,000. As of 2024, they are working with Poster Mirto McDonald and Pima County, Arizona to restore it.

== Use in media ==
The building's facade has been in the films Boys on the Side and Goats (film).
