= James Campbell Besley =

Australian adventurer and charlatan

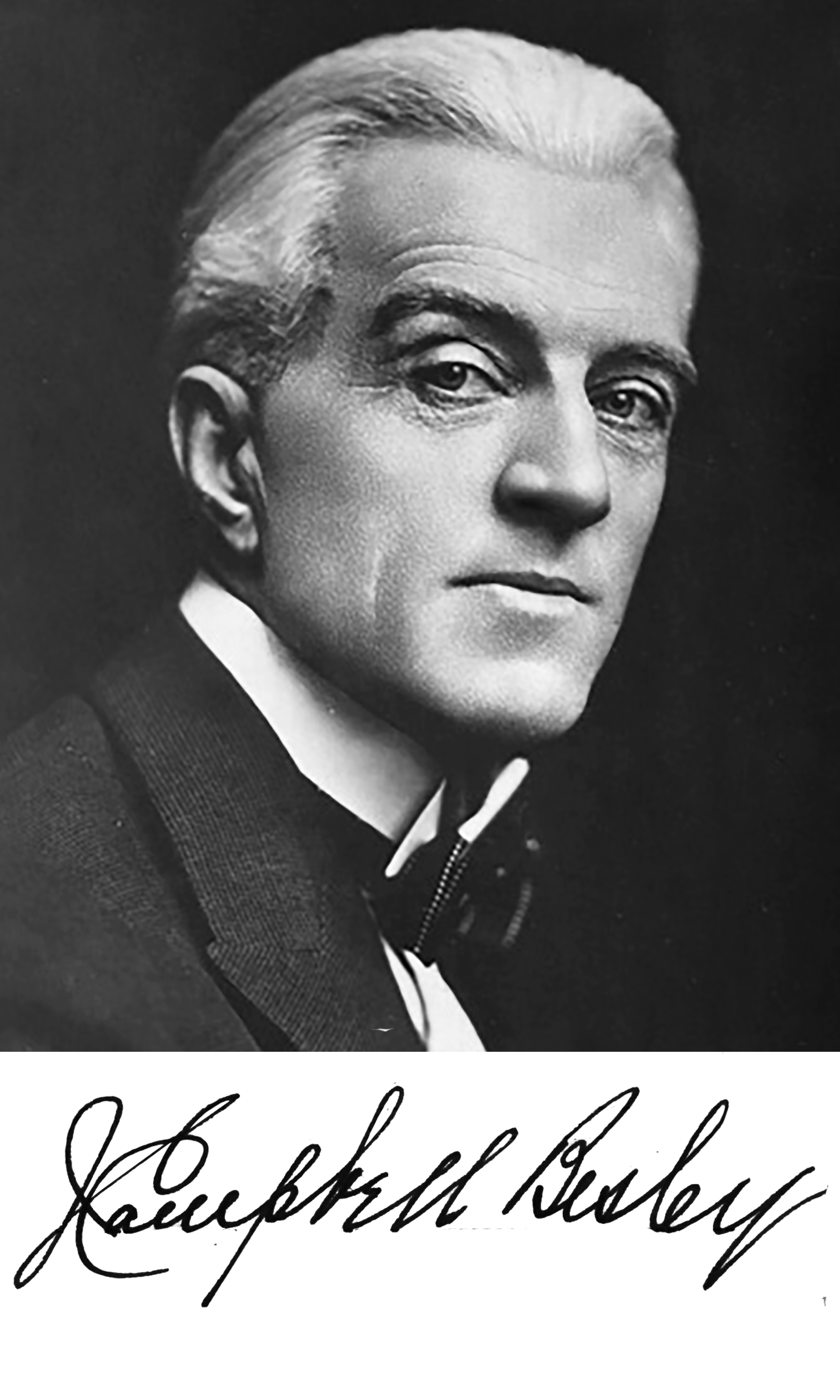
- Born: James Campbell Besley; 12 November 1879; Mt. Gambier, South Australia, Australia
- Died: 6 February 1954 (aged 74); St. Kilda, Melbourne, Victoria, Australia
- Occupations: Explorer, Amateur Anthropologist, Film Producer, Mine Owner, Polo player, Rancher, Entrepreneur, Charlatan

James Campbell Besley (12 November 1879 – 6 February 1954) also known as "Handsome Jim" Besley, "Captain James Campbell Besley", "Captain Jim", "Captain Besley", "Colonel Besley" was an Australian explorer, amateur anthropologist, film producer, mine owner, polo player, rancher and entrepreneur who traveled the world.

Besley was also a prodigious charlatan, spinning fanciful stories regarding his birth, upbringing and career. Besley manipulated the media for decades, lying to them during their efforts to report his exploits.

== Biography ==
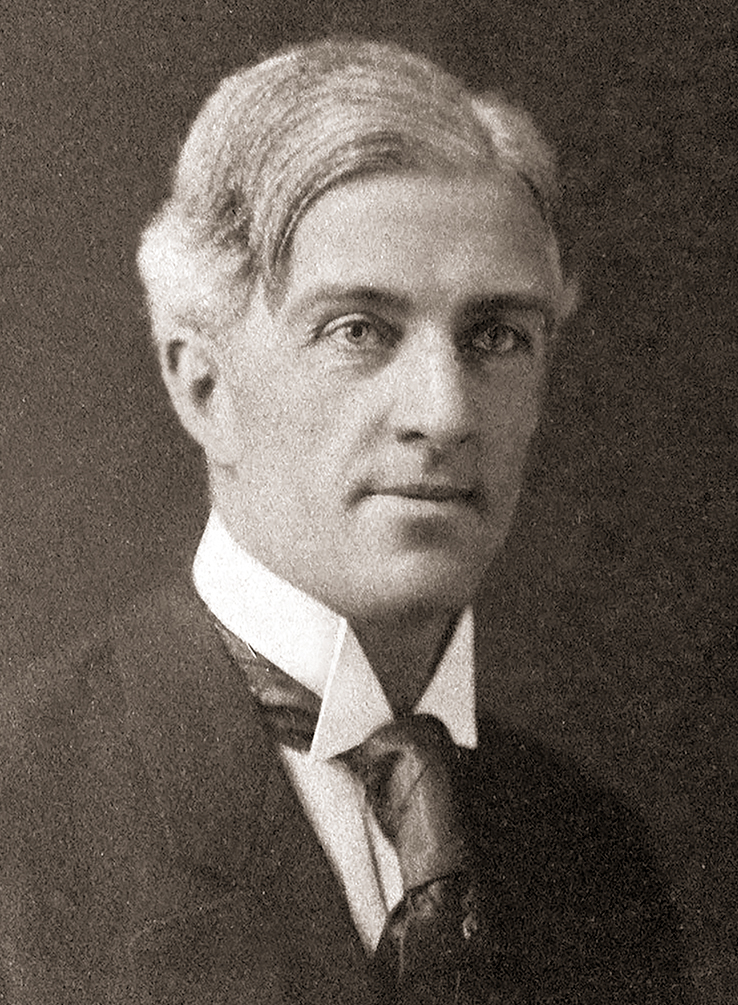
Portrait of James Campbell Besley, circa 1905

James Campbell Besley was born in Mt. Gambier, South Australia, the fourth of Mary Ann (née Harvey) and Bryan Charles Besley's eight children.

Traveling to America in 1898, three years later Besley embezzled $7,600 (equivalent to $294,120 in 2025) by forging and cashing checks drawn on the US Army Signal Corps office account in St. Michael, Alaska. An international manhunt for Besley took over two years, ending when he was found 300 miles north of Pretoria, South Africa. Besley was returned to Alaska, stood trial and was acquitted by a sympathetic jury.

In 1913, during an expedition to find the source of the Amazon River, Besley's adventure was filmed by director Franklin B. Coates. The film was named The Captain Besley Expedition. A substantial portion of the expedition film footage was discovered stolen after the expedition returned to New York city. Returning a year later, another film, In the Amazon Jungles with the Captain Besley Expedition was produced.

Successful as a broker of silver mines in Alaska and Mexico, a champion polo player, he later owned a riding academy in Phoenix, Arizona. Besley died in St. Kilda, Melbourne, Victoria, Australia.

== Prodigious charlatan ==
Many believe Besley's multiple (and often contradictory) "histories". The facts prove he continually misled many, including the press about basic aspects of his birth, upbringing, education, work and avocation. He spent decades manipulating the media to mislead the world about his life history, abilities, exploits and awards.

== Fictitious biographical claims ==
Besley's self-described, wildly contradictory "personal histories" were dutifully retold by an eager press. They grew longer and more elaborate over the course of his life. Over the years, many have been fooled due to an elaborate, false "biography" of Besley's life compiled in the Press Reference Library's 1913 edition of "Western Edition Notables of the West, Vol. I".

=== Fictitious personal histories ===
Besley claimed he had been born in London, England, traveled the world with his father from the age of seven and had served in the British Army. He claimed his father was "Inspector General of Forces in Australia and other British provinces" and an extensive landowner.

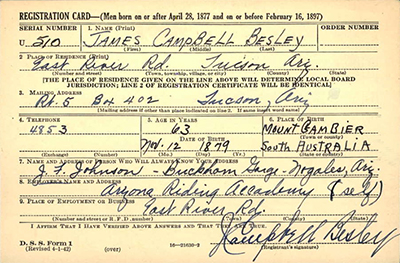
James Campbell Besley's WWII US draft card

James Campbell Besley was actually born in Australia, never served in the British Army and never held any military rank (including the ranks of Captain, Lieutenant Colonel and Colonel).

Besley's father, Bryan Charles Besley was born in Oxfordshire, England in 1836 and moved with his mother and siblings to Australia in 1851. The elder Besley joined the police force, eventually becoming police Inspector-In-Charge of the largest district in Australia and also held the post of Sub-Protector of Aborigines.

Besley claimed he returned to England for college and entered Eton in 1889 to prepare for Oxford. He claimed he received a degree from Eton in 1893 and immediately entered Oxford, but did not finish, having left at the end of two years to take up the study of mining and metallurgy. There are no records of a "James Campbell Besley" attending Eton or Oxford.

In 1890, Besley actually served as Honorable Secretary at the Port Augusta and Flinders Jockey Club in Port Augusta, Adelaide. Besley left the Jockey Club in 1891 to join his brother Brian Charles Besley's business, B. C. Besley and Co., of Broken Hill as a stock and station agent.

Besley had been arrested twice in the Yukon Territories in 1903 for embezzlement, fraud and financial malfeasance. In 1908, Besley later gave an interview claiming he had "come to New York after spending the past eight years in Mexico" and further claiming during that time he had been "one of the mining engineers for the late Cecil Rhodes, the former Prime Minister of the Cape Colony". There are no contemporary records of Besley working for Prime Minister Rhodes. Besley was a proven resident of the Yukon Territories during the claimed time frame, from 1899 to 1903.

In 1909, Besley claimed "he was born in Australia of Kentucky parents and counts himself an American by descent". In the newspaper article, Besley commented on former President Teddy Roosevelt's trip to Nairobi, British East Africa. Besley said the public "need not fear or tremble for his (Roosevelt's) safety so far as the wild beasts are concerned". Besley said he had "been all over that section" killing "many lions and other beasts".

In February 1912, a newspaper described Besley as being "the most noble Roman of them all".

In June 1912 Besley claimed in an interview with the San Francisco Examiner he had wounded Mexican "General" José Gil in a duel at Navojoa, Sonora, Mexico and that Gil would soon die from lead poisoning due to the bullets Besley had fired into Gil's body. Six months later, the San Francisco Examiner reported "the General was killed by Besley" during the duel. There are no contemporaneous records of Besley's claimed duel. Instead, José Goycolea Gil lived and served as President of Navojoa, Mexico in 1925.

In 1948, Besley said he had been "born on an immense British Government land grant near Adelaide in the southern part of Australia". He claimed he had come "to the United States around 1900, passed through Arizona and went on to Old Mexico, where he purchased several ranches, including the San Carlos outfit".

=== Fictitious Australian gold rush history ===
Besley claimed he had joined the rush to the gold fields of Kalgoorlie and Coolgardie in Western Australia and had been successful in finding gold. In 1894, Besley had instead applied for an Australian mining homestead lease on 4,154 acres of potential mining land and was refused. He lost two subsequent appeals for the mining lease. His brother B. C. Besley managed the Conrad Stannite Mines, Ltd., located at Borah Creek, New South Wales, Australia and founded the Broken Hill Polo Club in Broken Hill, New South Wales, Australia. B. C. Besley's horse "Fly" won the club's first Cup match.

=== Fictitious military service histories ===
Besley often falsely referred to himself as "Captain" Besley and "Colonel" Besley. He neither earned nor held an actual military rank, nor did he serve in any military capacity.

Besley claimed he served in the second Boer War, having been personally commissioned by Lord Kitchener to organize the "Boer Scouts" while he was surveying South Africa while serving as "private secretary" to Prime Minister Rhodes. Besley also claimed he was commissioned a Major during that war, and was placed at the head of the Carabiniers. He said when the Boer War ended in 1902, he voluntarily discarded the title of "Major". There are no records of a "James Campbell Besley" serving in the Boer War.

In a February 1913 news article, Besley's wife reported his claims of Captaincy and of serving in the Boer War were false. She said "from the time they met in 1898 till their marriage he was either in Alaska or California as she was corresponding with him all that time". These facts have been ignored by the press and researchers for decades as they continue to report Besley's purported exploits.

A September 1913 newspaper article said Besley "was one of the Irregular Horse (the South African Mounted Irregular Force militia)... before the siege of Mafeking" and further claimed Besley had served with Kitchener's Scouts, the Imperial Light Horse (Regiment) and had "seen service" in Borneo and Australia.

In 1914, Besley said in an interview "though he is a Britisher and has seen service under the British fiag, he is not an officer in the regular army". He said he instead held "a Captain's commission in the Rhodesia Light Horse, in which corps he fought during the Boer War". There are no records of a "James Campbell Besley" serving in the Rhodesian army.

In 1919, Besley claimed to be a Lieutenant Colonel "from London, England". It was reported "When England entered the Great War, Colonel Besley, then a captain, joined the English colors. He soon was in the middle of things, got wounded, promoted and honorably discharged".

In 1924, "Captain" Besley visited a Brisbane, Australia newspaper claiming he was a veteran Captain of the 7th Infantry Battalion of the British Columbia Regiment of the Canadian Army. He said he and his traveling partner were attempting an around the world bicycle tour, both hoping to win a £1,000 prize. There are no records of a "James Campbell Besley" serving in the Canadian army. During the interview, Besley claimed he had been born at Bulawayo, Zimbabwe, South Africa.

By the 1930s, Besley was often referring to himself as "Colonel" J. Campbell Besley.

In 1938 it was reported that "Colonel" Besley was "a retired British Army officer and a veteran polo player" who had played polo "many years in India while on duty there with the British Army".

== Arrival in America ==
Besley is first mentioned in the US press as staying at the Palace Hotel in San Francisco, California on 9 April 1898. Besley listed his address as "City".

== Alaskan embezzlement, forgeries, arrests and trial ==
=== Embezzlement and arrest ===
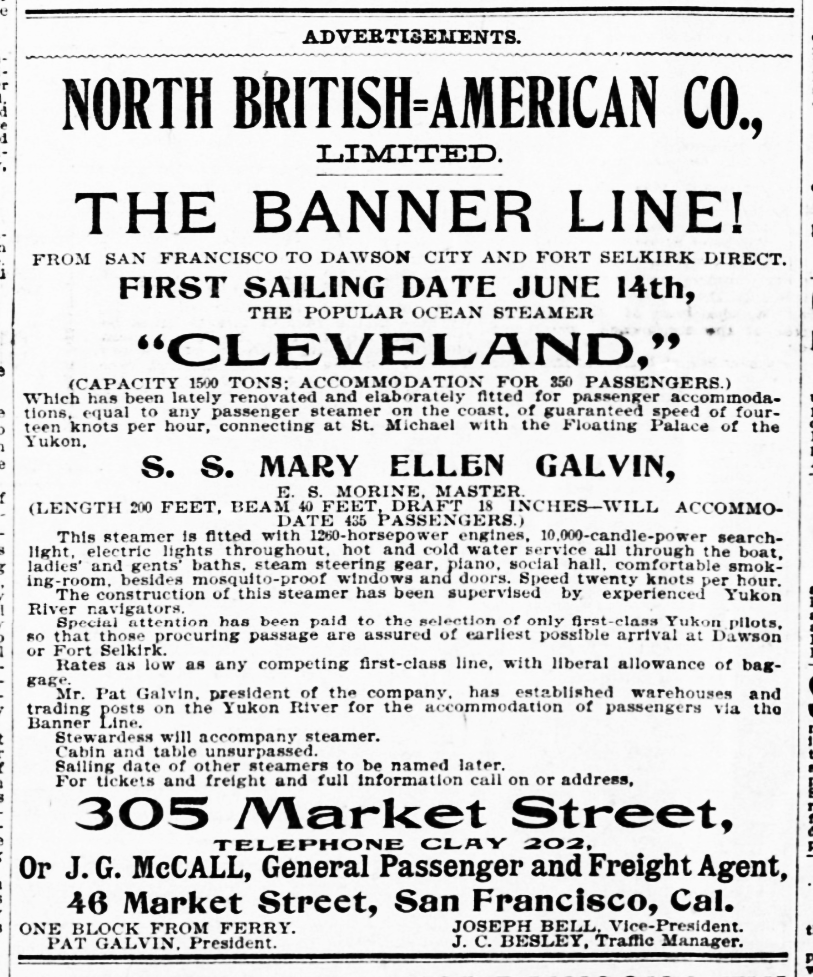
An 1898 North British American advertisement listing J C Besley as Traffic Manager of the company

Besley's brother Brian Charles Besley invested in the North British American Trading and Transportation Company, founded by Pat Galvin, a former Helena, Montana Chief of Police and one of the first millionaires in the Klondike gold rush. Capitalized at $3,500,000 (equivalent to $135,450,000 in 2025), the company was organized to provide transportation and trade to the Alaskan gold rush and enjoyed virtually unlimited credit on the Bank of England. Besley was hired by the company as accountant and traffic manager. A local newspaper named Besley one of Galvin's "false friends" who had caused Galvin "considerable losses".

In 1899 it was reported Besley had spent $40,000 (equivalent to $1,548,000 in 2025) of Galvin's money in Dawson City, Yukon, Alaska Territory providing food for a woman named "Lucille". Later, Galvin had to settle a claim made by Dawson Café Royal restaurant owner Jack Timmons for Besley's having ordered $1,435.00 (equivalent to $55,535 in 2025) for "female friends".

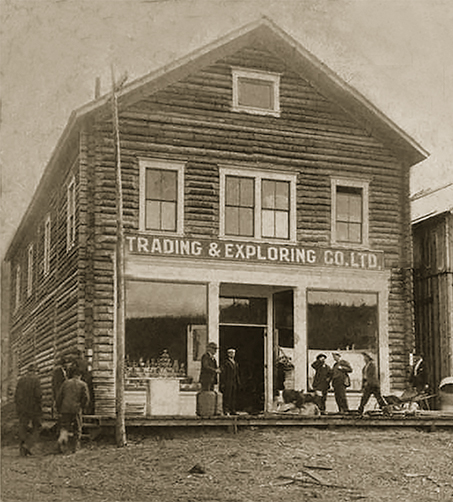
The headquarters of the Trading & Exploring Co., Dawson City, Yukon, Alaska Territory, 1899

Galvin's North British American Trading and Transportation Co. went bankrupt and was succeeded by the Trading & Exploration Co., chartered in London, England in 1899.

The Trading & Exploration Co. invested power of attorney in William White and sent him from London to investigate the company's finances in Dawson City. White reported "I called on the general manager, James Besley, and arranged to discuss business matters with him next day. I found him settled over the warehouse with his living quarters there, a Chinese cook and a very comfortable apartment... That evening I dined with Besley and we had a talk about the company's affairs, covering the mining and commercial business, over all of which he appeared to have had control. The following day we got down to serious work, and it wasn't long before I ascertained that it was impossible to make much headway, as the books, vouchers, etc., had all been destroyed by fire, said to have been of 'an accidental nature'. He (Besley) had a set of books showing only transactions since the date of the fire. I remarked that there was no sign of fire in the office and wondered how the books could have been burned, but he could throw no light on it. After further investigation I came to the conclusion that Besley himself had made away with the books, etc., in order to cover up evidence of his guilt as the one who had destroyed the company's property and robbed it of its assets... I was obliged next day to have a warrant issued for his arrest on a charge of embezzlement".

White further said of Besley "(he) was an Australian; tall, handsome and of an all-round 'hail fellow, well met' type. In the dance halls he was called 'The Prince' on account of his generosity to the girls, and was usually found of an evening in a private box, surrounded by them, drinking champagne. His tastes in this and other ways were of the most expensive kind, the poor old company always putting up the money".

Besley was finally indicted on two charges brought by J. B. Wood, manager of the Trading & Exploration Co. and Charles W. Thebo, manager of Galvin's meat syndicate. Besley was arrested, skipped a $10,000 (equivalent to $387,000 in 2025) bail and left for San Francisco. At the time, it was predicted he would not be taken back and stand for trial.

=== Federal forgeries ===
In 1901, Besley was a member of the firm "Burns & Besley", based in Cape Nome and St. Michael, Alaska, which "held a contract from the Government for the erection of a telegraph line from Dawson down the Yukon River". Two US Treasury Department checks totaling $7,600 (equivalent to $294,120 in 2025) had been drawn on the US Army Signal Corps office account in St. Michael, Alaska and had apparently been signed by Captain Frank Green. The checks had been endorsed "Burns & Besley per J. C. Besley, Member of the Firm" and the checks were paid by the Bank of Nome (Alaska) at the end of 31 August 1901 business day, the date of Besley's marriage. Three days later, the cashier at the bank wired the First National Bank of Seattle and stopped payment on the first $3,800 check. That same day, a second check endorsed "Burns & Besley per J. C. Besley, Member of the Firm" for another $3,800 was presented to the First National Bank of Seattle, who refused to honor the second check. Captain Green later advised the bank that two checks had been stolen from the Signal Corps office. The numbers of the stolen checks matched the two checks that had been presented to and paid by the Bank of Nome.

=== International manhunt and arrest ===
In 1903, Besley was indicted on six separate criminal charges in the US District Court, Second Division in Nome. Besley was found by Seattle, Washington Secret Service agent Charles E. Herron and Deputy US Marshal Daniel R. Dwyer. Their manhunt for Besley started after the special agents had first delivered William A. Wilson to Manila, Philippines. They had apprehended Wilson in Alaska on federal charges of embezzlement and were reimbursed $ 250,000 (equivalent to $8,958,333 in 2025) "in full compensation for their services and expenses in apprehending and delivering to the authorities of Manila, William A. Wilson, a fugitive from Justice".

Herron and Dwyer then traveled over 17,000 miles searching for Besley. Their search took them from the Alaskan Territory to the United States, Manila, Japan, China, Melbourne (Australia), Tasmania (New Zealand) and then to South Africa where they found Besley. The manhunt took nearly two years. They discovered Besley helping a group of American investors develop mining properties 300 miles north of Pretoria, South Africa.

Besley was arrested in Johannesburg, South Africa by Herron and Dwyer "on charges of forging United States Army paymaster's checks" in Alaska. Described as being "of fine appearance and gentlemanly in bearing", Besley "made no protest at having to leave his business and return to the United States, but insisted that the whole matter was a mistake, which he was as anxious as anyone else to have the matter cleared up". It was reported that the arresting officers allowed Besley to "close out his financial interests" in South Africa and "for one gold mine he received $75,000 (equivalent to $2,687,500 in 2025) in cash".

=== Back to Alaska for trial ===
Besley was transported to Southampton, England. On 11 July they sailed to New York city aboard the American Line steamer St. Paul. Treated by the arresting officers "as a companion" on the trip, passengers thought the three men "were prosperous American business men returning from abroad". Traveling "completely unembarrassed" and enjoying a trip from England to America "paid for by Uncle Sam", Besley charmed his fellow passengers, "traveling in style, hobnobbing with young ladies, rich widows", US Deputy Surveyor of Customs Col. John M. Bishop, actress Julia Marlowe and Senator Frederick Hale of Maine. Hale caused a sensation on the trip by mixing and serving a cocktail he claimed he had created to Besley and others, the "ginger ale jounce". Maine at the time had not abandoned Prohibition.

After arriving in New York, Besley was taken to Washington, D.C. and held in custody at the National Hotel while Herron and Dwyer's expense accounts, said to be "several thousands of dollars", were audited and paid. Besley was sent to Seattle, Washington, arriving on 29 July. Besley's estranged wife, Marjorie Bennett Besley traveled from San Francisco, met him in Seattle and provided funds for his defense. Besley was sent on "the first steamer for Cape Nome" to stand trial on all charges, including forgery. Besley's wife traveled to Monte Carlo and waited there in seclusion for the verdict.

=== Trial and acquittal ===
Having become a Major, former Captain Frank Greene of the US Signal Corps traveled from Manila to Juneau to serve as a witness in Besley's forgery trial. Besley was acquitted on the first charge. US Treasury Cashier Thomas Burns recommended dropping all other charges, saying "Besley was too popular to be convicted as the people believe he is the victim of persecution." The Court then upheld a motion made by Besley's attorney to drop all charges against him because the Alaskan court had moved the trial venue from Nome to Juneau, a jurisdictional overreach that denied Besley a trial judged by his local peers. The ruling read in part "the motion of the defendant to dismiss the present indictment, on the ground that the grand jury was without jurisdiction to inquire of the offense alleged to have heen committed at or near Nome in the second division, must be sustained, and it is so ordered." Besley was acquitted of all charges on 17 May 1903, causing a celebration in Juneau.

In December 1903, U. B. Solner, former cashier of the Bank of Cape Nome and a witness in the Besley forgery trial said the "evidence is stronger than ever against Besley" and that "a jury cannot be secured in Alaska to convict a man of a crime against the government".

=== Fictitious claims of second Alaskan trial ===
In January 1913, newspaper articles appeared in the Seattle Times and Alaskan newspapers claiming "Gentleman Jim" Besley had been sued for fraud by George "Tex" Rickard. The articles claimed Besley had persuaded Rickard to pay Besley's bail before his 1903 Alaskan embezzlement trial had started. The news articles reported Rickard paid Besley's bail in exchange for "a lot of phony mining property in Nome" as well as "certain interests in" South African "mining property" held by Besley. The articles falsely related how Besley had once again fled Alaska for Africa, how he had been found by Rickard and made to return to Alaska and stand trial. The articles claimed Besley had been acquitted for a second time. It was also falsely reported "Rickard is still out the money which he claims to have lost on his mining deal.". There are no records of Besley fleeing Nome the second time nor are there records of a 1913 "Rickard vs. Besley" trial within the Alaskan state archives.

== Bigamy and broken betrothal ==
After a courtship during the summer of 1912, Besley proposed marriage to Elizabeth Modini Wood, daughter of Mr. and Mrs. Charles Modini Wood. Wood was named "one of the most attractive and probably one of the richest debutantes" in Los Angeles, California. It was reported Wood and her sister Florence had inherited $40,000,000 (equivalent to $1.433333333×10^{9} in 2025) from their grandfather William H. Perry, a Los Angeles lumber merchant and financier.

The family hired the local Pinkerton detective agency office to investigate Besley. It was discovered that Besley was still married to Marjorie Bennett, whom he had met in 1898 while visiting San Francisco, California. While Besley was conducting business in Nome, Bennett, then 19 years old, traveled there and married Besley on 31 August 1901. They returned to San Francisco. Thirteen days after their marriage, Besley told his wife he had to leave for business and "that he was going away and not coming back". She did not hear from him for nearly two years. Urged by her parents, she sought a divorce from Besley, claiming "desertion". She received an interlocutory decree of divorce on 6 June 1903, but did not obtain a final decree. A newspaper article said "...Marjorie Besley is as much Besley's wife as on the day they were married".

Confronted with the certainty of being accused of bigamy if he married Wood, Besley withdrew his proposal in early February, 1913. Then he vanished. "Leaving behind his polo sticks and guns and a lot of puzzled friends wondering at his troubles with his first wife, Captain J. Campbell Besley has disappeared. Efforts of friends today to find him were fruitless. It is thought he has gone to Mexico, where he has been in the habit of making business trips."

== Mining activities ==
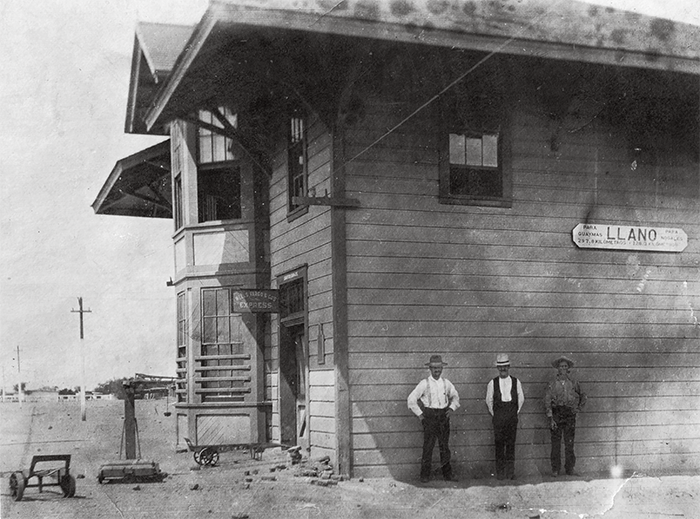
Walter Holt, Elgin Holt, James Campbell Besley at Wells Fargo office, Estacion Llano, Sonora, Mexico

In 1900, Besley was in Seattle, Washington acting as a representative of an Australian mining syndicate. He negotiated the purchase of eight Alaskan placer claims on Eldorado Creek in the Bonanza gold district near Nome from owner J. D. Morgan. Besley paid a $2,000 deposit on a total purchase price of $40,000.

In 1908, Besley sold the Noche Bueno mine, located near Soyopa, Sonora, Mexico to Charles P. Reinigar, an Ohio owner of mines throughout Mexico. Besley retained an interest in the mine. This became a point of contention and caused a subsequent lawsuit that Besley lost to Reiniger on appeal in 1914.

In December, 1909, Besley sold the Cerro de Plata mine, located in Sonora, Mexico, 25 miles southwest of Nogales, for $40,000 (equivalent to $1,382,143 in 2025) to a group of Kentucky investors who incorporated as The Cerro de Plata Mining Company with a capitalization of $1,000,000 (equivalent to $34,553,571 in 2025). Besley visited Lexington, Kentucky in April and September 1909. After two years of disappointing results, the investors asked Besley to find a purchaser for the mine. Besley brokered a deal with Elgin Bryce Holt and his brother Walter Holt purchasing the 150 acre mine.

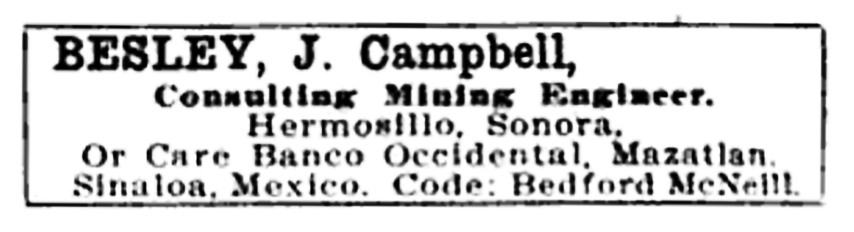
A trade advertisement listing J. Campbell Besley as a Mining Engineer, Mining and Scientific Press, Volume 102, 6 May 1911.

In 1911, Besley placed an ad in the Mining and Scientific Press trade journal, listing himself as a "Consulting Mining Engineer". He had no formal education in mine engineering.

In 1913, "Life Member" J. Campbell Besley resigned from the American Institute of Mining Engineers.

In 1952, Besley placed a classified ad in the Pittsburgh, Pennsylvania Post-Gazette offering a "well prospected" tungsten property near the Mexican border. The ad said Besley required the "funds and machinery to mine and ship ore", mentioned "liberal interest given" and listed his address as Tucson, Arizona.

== Polo player ==
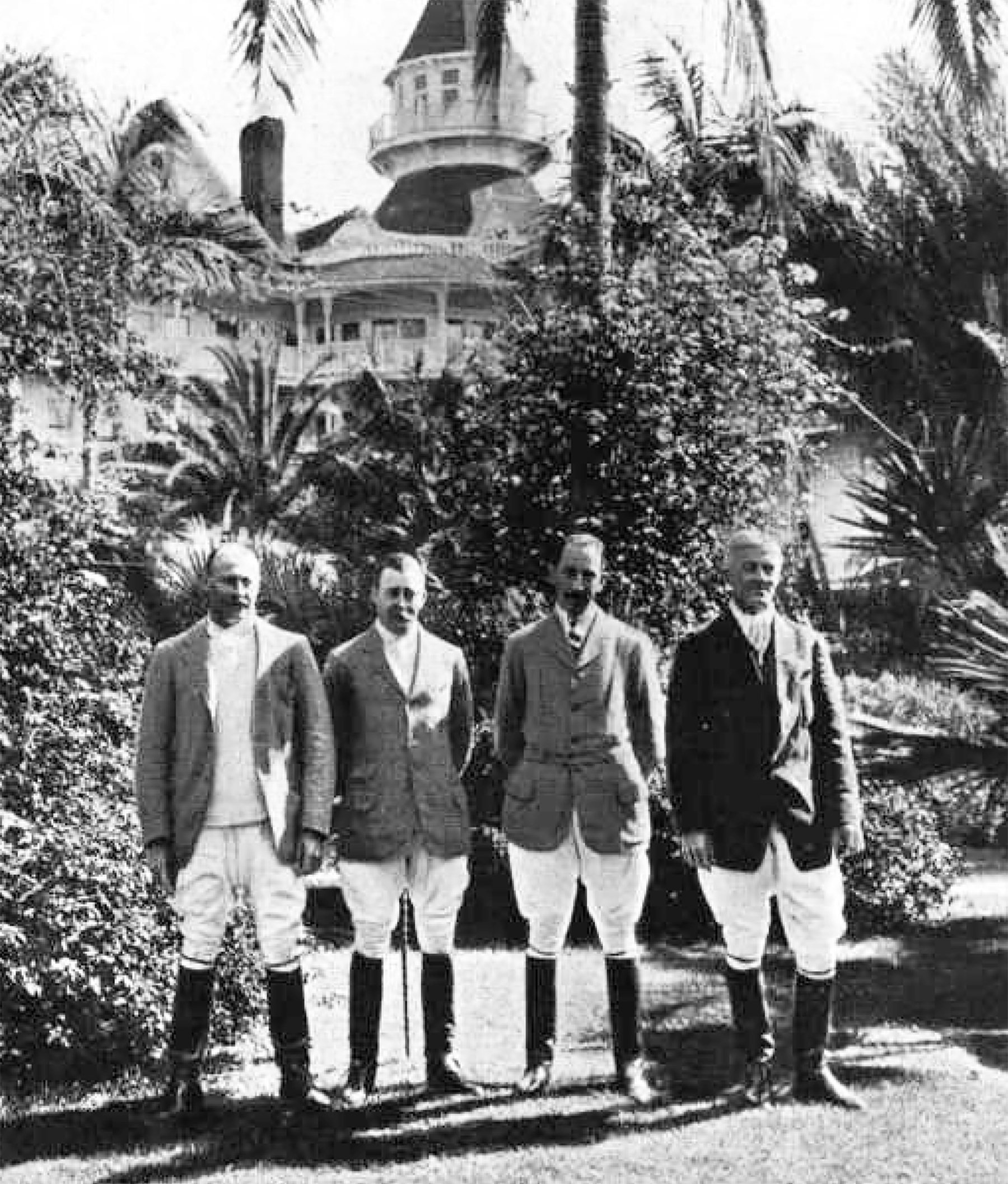
1913 Coronado Country Club polo team members (left to right) Lord Tweedmouth, Lord Alastair Innes-Ker, F. McLaughlin and James Campbell Besley.

Besley was a horseman and a trophy winning polo player. Besley said he started playing polo at 13. He played on the Coronado (California) Country Club team when they won the Pacific Coast All-American trophy during the Pacific Coast Open in 1913. His teammates included Malcolm Stevenson, C. Perry Beadleston and Major Colin G. Ross, "the father of polo" at Coronado.

Besley was described by Outing magazine as "a handsome fellow, his hair prematurely white. his face bronzed by adventures in many climes, Captain Besley was a striking figure on the Hillsborough polo fields. In playing polo, he affected an English helmet, giving him the outward appearance of a handsome cavalier. He had no ponies of his own, but that mattered little -- for Walter Dupee, the Chicago millionaire horseman, who makes his winter home at Coronado, is ever ready to supply his boon companions with spirited mounts from his string".

In 1928, Besley played forward on the Sonora (Mexico) Tigers polo team. A newspaper article claimed Besley was "a former British polo star" and said he was "still a brilliant forward in spite of his 60 odd years. In every play of the Tigers, the tall, spare form of the Colonel is seen in the scrimmage, and his accurate mallet has been a strong weapon in the Sonoran's attack".

In the 1930s, "Colonel" Besley introduced polo to the cowboys and guests of the Circle Z Ranch located in Patagonia, Arizona. Besley was a guest and the polo coach at the ranch "for several seasons". The Circle Z "Wranglers" polo team competed for four years, defeating teams from the University of Arizona (the "Wildcats"), US Army Fort Huachuca, the Santa Monica Riviera, the New Mexico Military Institute as well as the Nogales, Arizona "Cowboys".

In 1938, it was reported "Colonel J. Campbell Besley, retired British officer, lay in critical condition" from a broken neck suffered in a polo match on 9 January between his team, the Nogales Internationals and the University of Arizona. Besley was thrown, landing on his stomach when his mount "stumbled and fell". His horse "turned a somersault and landed with his (the horse's) hips on the Colonel's neck and shoulders". Besley was carried from the field unconscious, having "suffered a neck fracture at the base of the skull".

== The Capt. Besley Motion Picture Company, Inc. ==
In 1912, Paul Rainey's African Hunt, a silent film of an African safari led by explorer Paul J. Rainey grossed over a half-million dollars (equivalent to $16,681,034 in 2025), an extraordinary sum for an early motion picture. It was one of the most successful non-fiction films of the decade. Rainey's safari team included a photographer and a taxidermist from the Smithsonian Institution. The success of Rainey's films led to a boom in expedition and nature films. These were silent films, so many of these films were at first presented by a lecturer in a lyceum-like context.

Besley incorporated "The Capt. Besley Motion Picture Company, Inc." in New York on 17 July 1913 with Franklin B. Coates and F. Eugene Farnsworth. The company's headquarters were located at 110 South 40th Street in New York City. Besley, Farnsworth and Coates assembled an expedition team to produce a film similar to Rainey's in South America.

== Besley's filming expeditions ==
=== First expedition to Peru and the Amazon ===
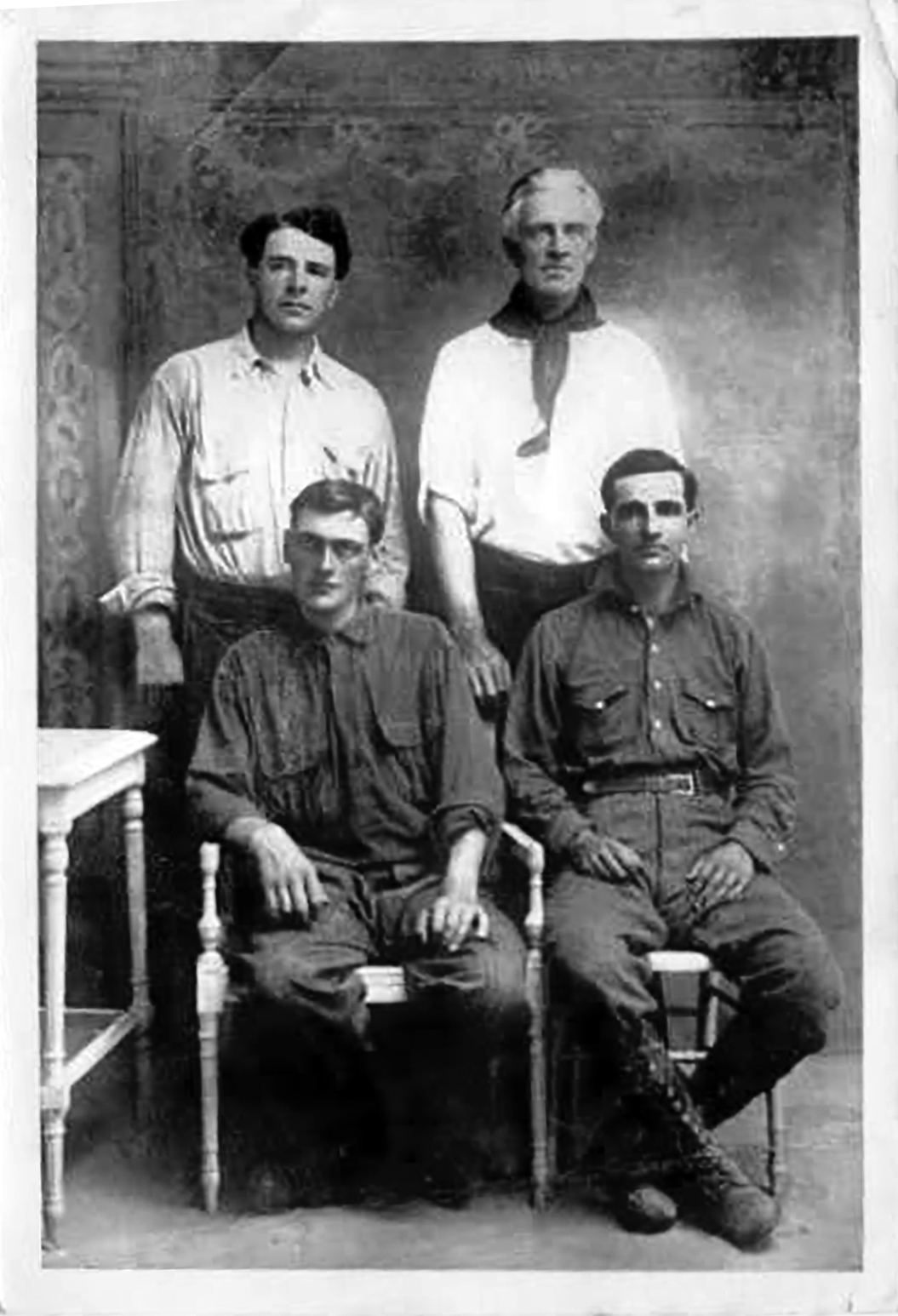
1913 first Besley Peruvian Expedition team photo - Front row, left to right: William Dunn, J. K. Holbrook; back row, left to right: Franklin B. Coates, James Campbell Besley

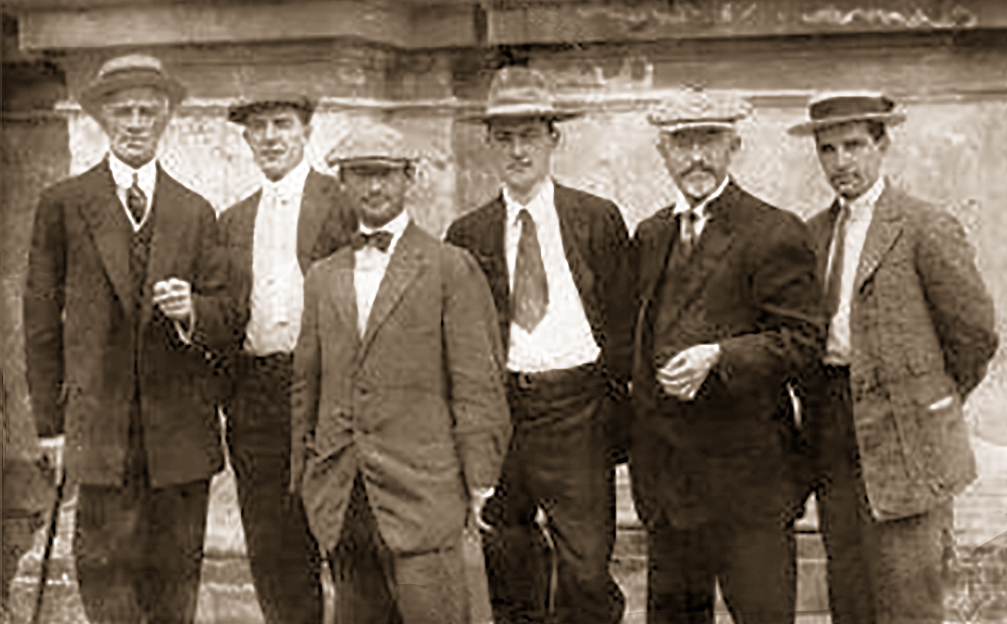
(Left to right) James Campbell Besley, Franklin B. Coates, Arthur Galaid, J. W. Dunn, F. Eugene Farnsworth and John Knight Holbrook before their 1913 South American Expedition.

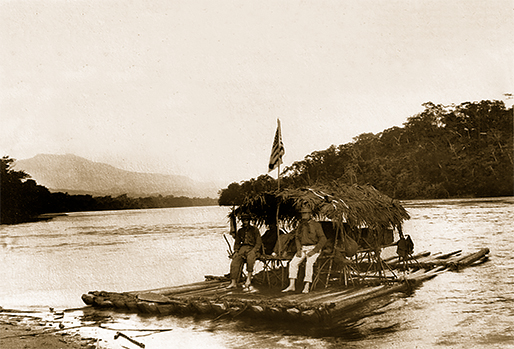
Franklin B. Coates (left) and James Campbell Besley (right) rafting on the Upper Marañon River, the principal source of the Amazon River, on the first Besley South American Expedition in 1913.

The Besley party set out on the film documentary expedition on 19 July 1913. The party of five sailed on the RMS Magdalena from New York harbor to Lima, Peru to explore "the dark and uninhabited parts of the continent". The expedition was said to be "financed by a British nobleman". Besley was detained at the last minute and said he would sail the next Saturday.

The members of the expedition included film director Franklin B. Coates, who acted as manager; cinematographer John Knight Holbrook, and William Jerome Dunn, botanist. Besley acted as the expedition zoologist. Others were film producer F. Eugene Farnsworth of Boston and Graflex still photographer Arthur Maurice Galaid. George Shoup, an American mining engineer, and Reginald Leonard, an expert appointed by the Peruvian government to study the uta fly (Lutzomyia sand flies, the reservoir of the Leishmania parasites that cause Andean cutaneous leishmaniasis) joined the expedition in Peru and remained there after the Besley's tour ended.

Director Coates said of Holbrook during the trip "I want to say that Holbrook is one of the bravest and gamest men I ever met. He did without hesitation and without question everything that was asked or required of him. He was in many extremely dangerous situations, but he never flinched".

During the trip, a pack mule fell from a steep slope into a stream, severely damaging one of two Pathé motion picture cameras. 3,000 feet of film and a number of dry negative plates were lost. After returning to Lima, Besley and Coates journeyed to the "buried cities of the Incas" and decided to attempt a third trip to traverse the continent from the source of the Amazon River to its mouth through uncharted regions "from which no known white man had returned". It was claimed President Guillermo Enrique Billinghurst of Peru attempted to dissuade them. The group also met with H. Clay Howard, the US envoy to Peru.

Besley, Coates, Dunn and Holbrook made the journey on horseback, foot, canoe and raft. Along the way, Dunn found what the team believed were the bones of missing American explorers Mirko Seljan and Patrick O'Higgins. The team gave the remains "an impressive Christian burial and erected a cross".

=== Theft of first expedition film footage ===
The team returned to New York on the Byron, a ship in the Lamport and Holt line on 17 February 1914. They brought with them 7,000 feet of film in "perfect" condition from the Amazon trip, intending to cut the film to 5,000 feet for presentation on the lecture circuit. Coates discovered that the footage shot on the two earlier legs of the trip, which had been shipped to New York city from Lima, Peru before the team explored the Amazon had been stolen.

Coates said of the theft "...when the trunk was opened in the appraiser's otfice here it was discovered that all the films had been abstracted". Coates employed the Burns detective agency, offering a reward of $1,000 for "the return of the film and no questions asked". Coates said "if in thirty days he gets no returns from the circulars he is sending out he will start for Peru and retake all the locations he photographed before". Besley said he would arrange to meet Coates in Peru and take part in the expedition.

=== Newspaper coverage of first expedition ===
Besley's news coverage was both national and international. In typical fashion, Besley greatly exaggerated the facts and outright lied to the press in newspaper interviews, relating such "facts" as "We lived on whistling monkeys and boiled green bananas... we had to kill 40 to 50 savages to save our own lives... we started with eleven white huskies (explorers) and we finished with four". Besley claimed natives continually threatened the expedition. "For 30 days they had to fight their way through cannibal tribes... several times the party feared starvation, its members living on nuts and cracked corn for days."

Besley was interviewed by the Belgian newspaper La Métropole in February 1914. The article mentioned "Captain Besley in an interview just gave the correspondents (of La Métropole) interesting information about his explorations in Peru...(During a trip) from Lima to July with help (Besley) arrived at Cuzco, the ancient capital of the Incas. He met an old Indian who took him to the ruins of three ancient Indian cities". The article mentioned Besley relating how he saw "blocks of stone weighing between 300 and 500 tons (with) close masonry and one wonders which engineers managed to build buildings with such materials." Besley also claimed that "...most of the objects (we) found were of an alloy of gold and silver". This interview's content predated Besley's later interviews from the second expedition.

By 1915, Besley claimed the first expedition was composed of "six white men and a dozen native porters" and three of the men were killed and "only three returned". He also claimed the expedition cost $ 50,000 (equivalent to $1,607,143 in 2025).

=== Mining research during trip ===
Besley took advantage of the trip to research mines and mining techniques along the course of the expedition. In early November, 1913 Besley's friend, Santa Cruz, California inventor and mine operator Charles R. Bushnell met the expedition and inspected the mines at Cerro de Pasco, Peru. Cerro de Pasco is one of the world's richest silver producing areas after silver was discovered there in 1630. It is still an active mining center.

=== Second expedition to Peru, Bolivia and Argentina ===
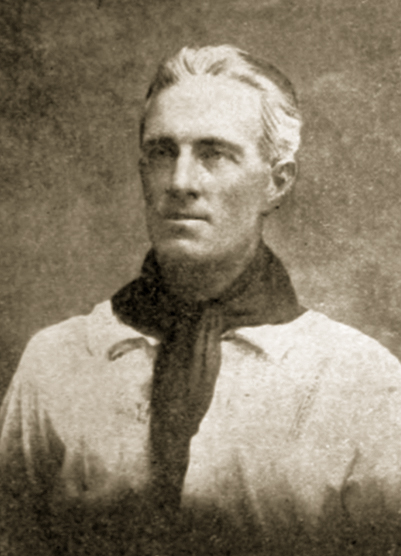
Photograph of James Campbell Besley during 1914 Second Peruvian Expedition

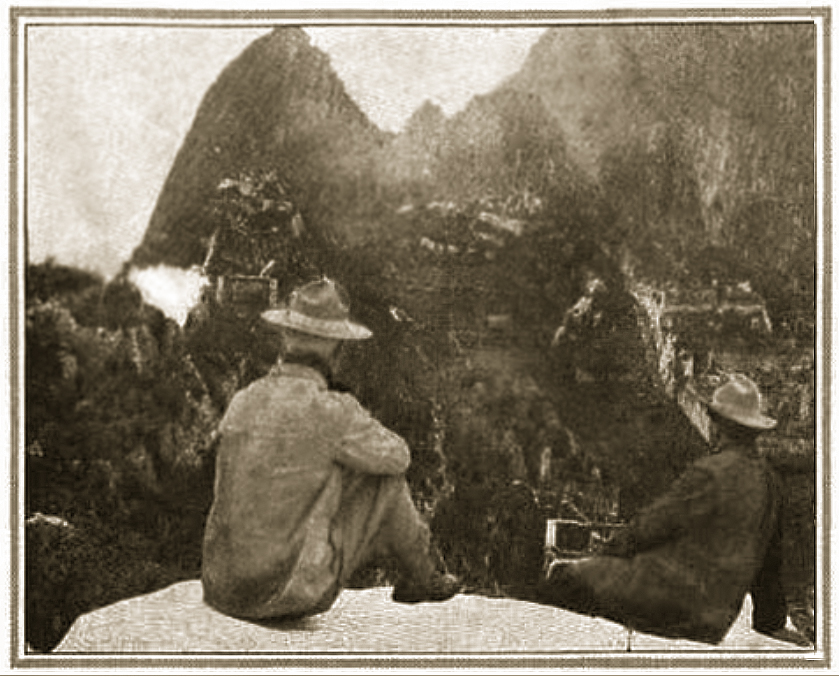
James Campbell Besley (on left) with guide looking at Machu Picchu in the Eastern Cordillera of southern Peru during Besley's second South American expedition in 1914.

Besley announced another expedition would commence in 1914 so the missing footage could be replaced. In April 1914, Besley, Coates and Holbrook returned to Peru to reshoot the lost footage.

Arriving in Buenos Aires, Argentina they traveled on the Transandine Railway to Santiago, Chile. They crossed the Puente del Inca, a natural arch bridging the Las Cuevas River, a tributary of the Mendoza River located in Mendoza Province, Argentina. From there, Besley and his team crossed the Andes on foot, claiming to have made the journey in nine days. Besley claimed the team visited Lake Titicaca, on the border of Bolivia and Peru, "the highest navigable lake" in the world.

During the expedition, Besley claimed to have found "the true source of the Amazon River", claiming the source to be a small spring in Peru "at the uppermost Río Vilcanota–Urubamba–Ucayali".

In a July 1914 interview Besley said he had "vowed he would cross the mighty Andes on foot, and cross them he did, spite of the wiseacres who said that it meant certain death".

In another interview, Besley said of the second expedition "We've got some good stuff, and we think some thrilling bits, too, as well as a mass of most informing and educational matters. We have got pictures of wild beasts and snakes, but try your best, you can't get your narrowest escapes on the film. If you knew when danger lurked, if your sun was shining and no trees intervened, and all the thousand and one essentials were in harmony it might be easier to put over the really big stuff. But come over anyway and see what we have to show you. I believe it is the best that has yet to be accomplished in the exploring and adventure line - yes, and educational too".

=== Return ship rammed ===
Besley and the expedition team returned to New York city on the United Fruit Company passenger and cargo steamer Metapan. At 15:20 on 15 October 1914, the outbound Iowan rammed the Metapan at the entrance of Ambrose Channel outside New York. The Metapan had stopped due to fog and had sounded three blasts on the ship's whistle warning the Iowan of the impending collision. The Iowan's captain did not alter his ship's course, but did drop her anchor to try and slow the fully laden ship. Nevertheless, the Iowan gashed the bow of the Metapan, traveling almost halfway through the passenger ship. The Metapan began to rapidly sink, becoming grounded in 18 feet (5.5 m) of water. Besley's scientific expedition had brought cargo from Peru including two Incan mummies, jewelry, pottery and other artifacts and motion picture film documenting the expedition. Besley's cargo was safely recovered from the ship.

=== Claims of proof of prehistoric giants, skulls, mummies and voodoo ===
Besley's second expedition film was claimed to include proof of "giant skeletons and lost cities built of massive stones that he (Besley) said would be impossible to build without modern machinery". It was reported that Besley had arrived in New York from his second expedition in South America, bringing a number of scientific treasures, including the skull of a human being "who must have been eight feet in height". Besley said of the skull "A tradition among the Indians of Peru and Bolivia makes the ancient race a race of giants... This may be a legend which weighed between 100 and 200 tons. It might be that we stumbled upon an isolated giant who was as much a wonder when he lived as he would be today".

Other curiosities of great interest were human skulls thought to be four or five thousand years old, on which trepanning operations had been performed. These were said to be found in Bolivia, in Inca ruins. The skulls were said to have been trepanned by sawing out a square, tilting metal through it and replacing that section, and had been found by excavators in Peru and Bolivia.

Besley also claimed the second expedition brought back two "pre-Inca vases" and two human mummies, said to be "forty or fifty centuries old" that had been found "swathed in a sitting posture with the hands thrust under the jaws".

Besley is quoted as having observed the widespread practice of voodoo on his South American expeditions.

== Spurious expedition claims ==
In typical fashion, Besley embellished many aspects of both expeditions. During the second journey, Besley said the team "rescued" Australian explorer William Carr, who they claimed was found unconscious by one of the team's dogs, "having been buried for twenty-four hours in a snow drift". Besley claimed "I got hold of his tongue, pulled it out, poured brandy down his throat, chafed his hands and feet, and gradually he opened his eyes." Carr's surviving that long in freezing temperatures would have been impossible.

In a 1914 interview about the first expedition, Besley said "there were eleven in the party, seven men having joined the four just for the experience of it... eight of our party of eleven fell ill with the fevers and seven of them lost all interest in the trip".

In 1917, discussing the first expedition, Besley said "of the twelve white men who started, only four returned. Several fell victims of the poisoned arrows of the natives".

Besley said in a 1918 article "shortly before our expedition started a force of 135 Peruvian soldiers were ambushed and massacred to a man... Unfortunately all our dogs sacrificed their lives to secure our safety, some being killed by jaguars but most by poisoned arrows".

== 1914 Besley expedition film ==
=== Production and premiere ===
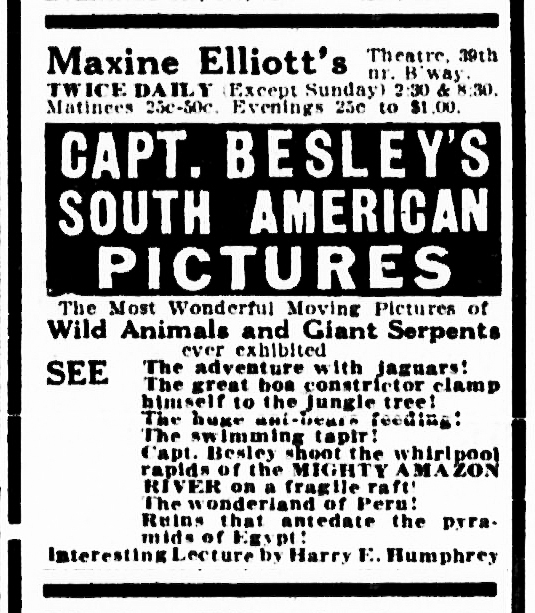
1915 newspaper advertisement for Capt. Besley's South American Pictures, Maxine Elliott's Theatre, New York City

According to a news story in November 1914, Besley planned to quickly edit the 16,000-18,000 feet of film they returned with so it would be ready for presentation in a New York theater. The film premiered at Maxine Elliott's Theatre on 15 January 1915.

=== Assignment of rights to Besley Expedition media ===
In 1914 and 1915, The Capt. Besley Motion Picture Company had a total of $1,097 (equivalent to $22,275 in 2025) in attachments placed on its Manhattan, New York office for outstanding debts.

In 1915, The Capt. Besley Motion Picture Company sold the "sole and exclusive right to produce for the entire world the moving picture films and still pictures taken by the Captain Besley Motion Picture Expedition in 1913 and 1914" to the Scenograph Feature Film Company, Inc. Scenograph had been acting as the distributor of the Besley film. Besley reserved the right to own "one positive print of the expedition film for his personal use in presentations" as well as any future compensation Besley might recover from the W. R. Grace company. Besley had filed against that company for having lost the motion picture and still film negatives he had shipped from Peru to New York during the 1913 expedition.

== Theft of 1914 expedition movie ==
Percy A. McCord was Besley's expedition secretary and an author of magazine articles about Besley's second expedition. He also served as general manager of the Captain Besley Motion Picture Company. In 1914, McCord stole a copy of the second Besley expedition film from the Scenograph Film Company. McCord attempted to sell the film to other film distributors, saying he personally owned the rights to the Besley movies.

McCord showed the film to cinematographer Robert J. Flaherty, who had created the early and acclaimed documentary Nanook of the North. McCord offered to sell Flaherty the distribution rights to the Besley film. Flaherty said "Mr. McCord is, distinctly, uneducated, Illiterate" and said the Besley film "has no artistic or literary merit above the merest newspaper 'copy'..." Flaherty's wife Frances' review of the film was "the photography was abominable, the subject matter entirely superficial..."

McCord also used the stolen copy of the Besley expedition film in a Manhattan stock swindle. McCord was arrested on 11 March 1916, on a complaint filed by Louis Michaels. Michaels claimed to be an official of the Scenograph Film Company who owned the rights to the Besley films. Michaels was actually working for John B. G. Rinehart, a Manhattan attorney who had swindled an investor when he had McCord arrested.

== Besley film related stock swindle ==
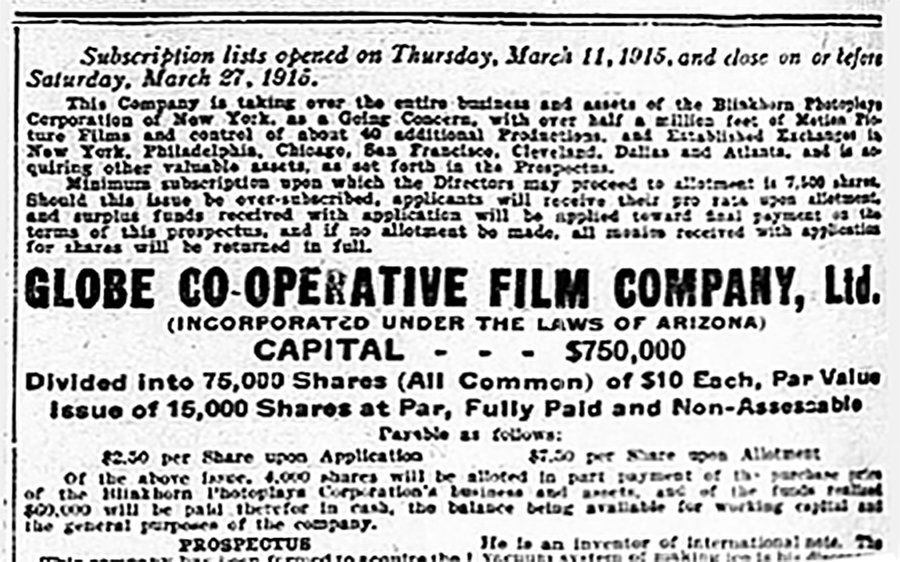
A newspaper advertisement excerpt for the Globe Co-operative Film Company, Ltd.

In 1915, John B. G. Rinehart, a Manhattan attorney and Walter Content, an owner of a Manhattan stock brokerage, purchased stock in a shell company in Arizona, the "Globe Co-operative Film Company, Ltd.". Newspaper ads across America claimed the newly formed company had purchased the assets of the failed Blinkhorn Photoplay Company. Potential investors were urged to purchase stock. The newly formed company had no association with the Blinkhorn company. The New York State Supreme Court later determined the Globe Co-operative Film Company stock was "absolutely worthless".

Joseph H. Cohen, a New York city resident, had recently inherited some $20,000 from his grandfather. Rinehart and Content's representatives told Cohen the Globe Co-operative Film Company "owned or controlled the Besley South American exploration movie". They claimed the value of the movie was "very great" and was "comparable... with the celebrated Rainey African hunt picture", telling Cohen "the Rainey movie had earned $1,000,000" (equivalent to $31,825,658 in 2025).

Percy A. McCord, secretary of the Capt. Besley Motion Picture Company had stolen a copy of the Besley film in 1914 and was attempting to sell it to film distributors. When McCord had heard about the $12,000 stock sale by Rinehart to Cohen from a detective hired by Cohen, "he demanded (of the detective) to know the name of the man who thought so highly of the pictures as to invest $ 13,000 in the stock of a company that supposedly owned them". Rinehart told McCord Cohen's name, asked McCord not to contact Cohen, and to let Rinehart's associates handle the negotiations. Rinehart wrote McCord a $100 check to screen the stolen copy of the film for Cohen during the stock purchase negotiations. The cancelled check endorsed by McCord was entered as evidence in the lawsuit.

Rinehart offered Cohen $10 per share stock at a reduced rate of $6 per share. Cohen was told the stock was at that time unlisted but would "soon be listed upon the curb (over the counter)". Cohen was further told if he purchased the stock, the brokerage would recommend it to their clients, and Cohen could within a short time easily sell the stock for $12 to $13 per share. Cohen was also told that then Massachusetts Governor Eugene Foss was interested in investing in the movie. Cohen invested $13,000 in April, 1915, but quickly learned the stock was worthless and sued for a refund.

Cohen won his case on appeal and was awarded $15,400, refunding his investment and court costs. The Appellate Division of the New York State Supreme Court said in its decree "The company (Globe Co-operative) was a mere paper corporation, it neither controlled nor had any option on the picture it exhibited to the plaintiff, and in fact the whole transaction was a very common swindle.".

== Expedition lecture tours ==
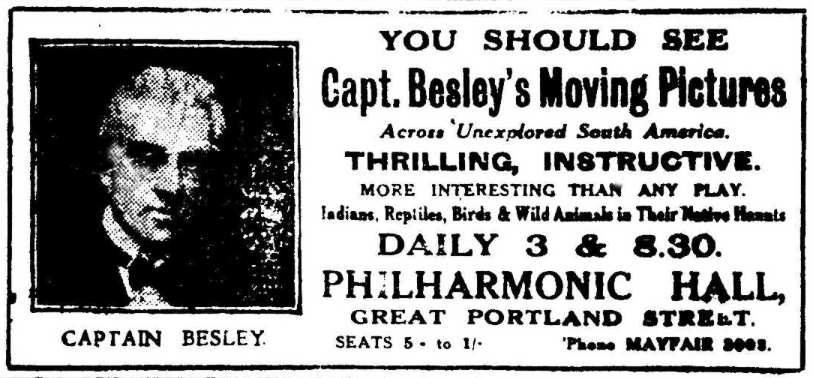
A 1917 James Campbell Besley lecture advertisement from London Evening News

Besley toured the globe presenting lectures, showing photographs and the film from the 1914 expedition while recounting both expeditions. In typical fashion, Besley started exaggerating the facts of both trips in order to attract audiences.

=== Spurious claims of expedition deaths ===
By 1917, Besley claimed the expedition was a success "but at considerable cost of life, for of the twelve white men who started, only four returned". None of Besley's party died on either trip. In February, 1914, a newspaper article recounted how Besley asked the expedition who among them wanted to push ahead to the Amazon and who wanted to return to New York. According to the article, "seven men said they wanted to go back, and they did..."

Besley's list of expedition members who had died frequently changed, from one interview to another. For instance, Besley often claimed film producer F. Eugene Farnsworth died on the journey in 1914. Farnsworth actually died in 1926 after having become the "King Kleagle" of the Ku Klux Klan in Maine.

Belsey often claimed Graflex still photographer Arthur Galaid died during the trip, but he accompanied the team during the entire first expedition in 1913. Galaid was a published Newspaper Enterprise Association photographer in the 1920s.

Besley often claimed another expedition member, gold and silver mine owner George Shoup died from a bite on his leg "by some venomous insect or reptile". Besley said after Shoup's leg "commenced to swell and turn blue", Shoup had died "a couple of days out from Calleo, Peru on an emergency trip home." Shoup actually died in San Francisco in 1918, an apparent suicide. Shoup was a cousin of the California Southern Pacific Railroad magnate Paul Shoup.

On January 16, 1928, Besley gave a lecture to the monthly meeting of the Archeological and Historical society at the University of Arizona about his 1914 trip to the Amazon. He claimed "12 scientists and 60 porters" traveled on the expedition with him. The lecture included stories of a battle with natives "in which several of his men were killed". Besley claimed "he lost a score (twenty or so) or more in all of men to the Indians and the rapids".

=== London lectures at the Royal Geographical Society and for British Royalty ===
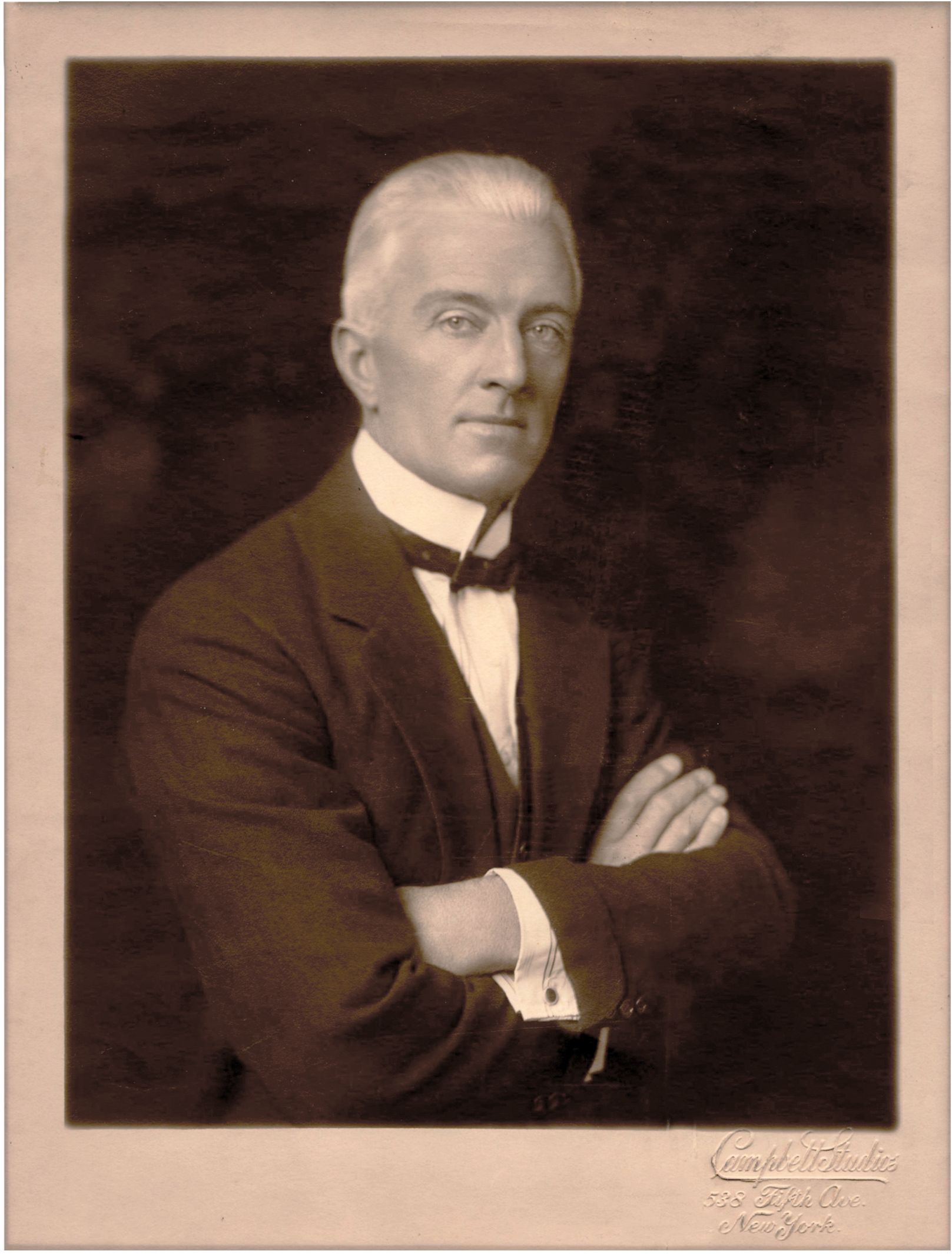
A photo of James Campbell Besley, circa 1917. Photographer, Campbell Studios, 538 Fifth Avenue, New York (Photographer).

On 11 January 1917, Besley presented a lecture to the Royal Geographical Society at the Burlington Gardens in London.

A review published in the RGS' The Geographical Journal described the presentation as "a magnificent series of pictures illustrating his recent journey from the Peruvian coast over the Cordillera of the Andes and down into the Amazon forests... in a continuous series of pictures lasting two hours Mr. Besley showed the incidents of the voyage, the journey from Mollendo to Cuzco and Lake Titicaca; the principal Inca buildings, the descent of the eastern face of the Cordillera to the headwaters of the Apurimac and thence into the Amazonian forests, concluding with some especially fine pictures of the animal and reptile life. It is impracticable to describe in a brief space the incidents of the journey, which included many breathless descents of rapids on frail rafts. The procession of forest scenery as seen from the raft was of extraordinary beauty and interest. It is much to be hoped that those who had not the good fortune to be present at the meeting will have a further chance of seeing these pictures, many of which are of great geographical interest and educational value."

On 17 February 1917, Besley presented his film The Amazon River and the Unexplored South America with the Besley Expedition to King George V and Queen Mary of Teck of Great Britain, Princess Mary and Field-Marshal the Duke of Connaught during a tea held for a number of officers in the British Overseas Expeditionary Forces at Buckingham Palace, London, England. It was reported to be "the first of a series of weekly entertainments for overseas soldiers arranged by Their Majesties the King and Queen."

On 22 March 1917, Besley gave his first "kinematograph lecture" entitled "From Pacific to Atlantic" at the Duchess of Rutland's matinee at the Philharmonic Hall in London. Proceeds were to be given to "war charities". Besley continued to present the lecture to the public. In April 1917 The Illustrated London News recommended Besley's presentation: "That his experiences are of exceptional interest goes without saying".

=== Fined for illegally obtaining gasoline ===
While in London during 1917, Besley was fined 50 pounds and court costs for illegally obtaining ten gallons of "motor-spirit" (gasoline) without a permit in violation of the British Defence of the Realm Act (as amended in 1915).

== Good luck mascot promotion ==
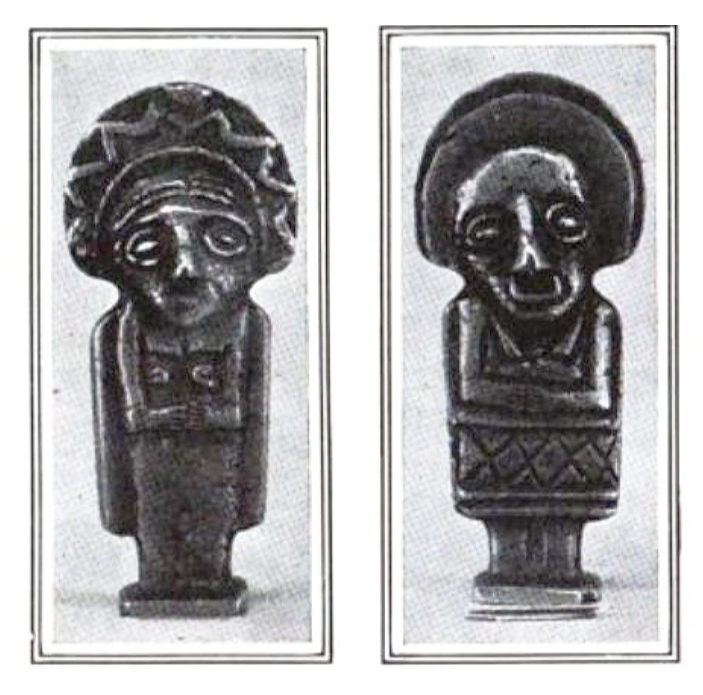
James Campbell Besley Mascot Amulet - obverse and reverse

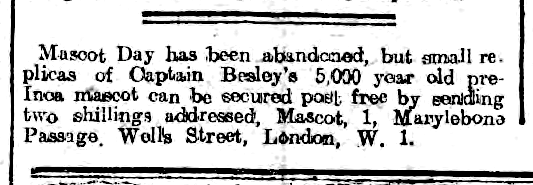
1917 newspaper article explaining how to order the Besley Pre-Inca Good Luck Mascot

For a number of years Besley offered for sale replicas of his "good luck mascot" (charm) to newspaper readers in Europe and Canada, often claiming the proceeds would benefit various local charities.

Described as a "5,000 year old, small, pre-Inca idol, embossed on one side with the figure of a woman and on the other with that of a man", the mascot was advertised as having been given to the "Captain" many years ago in Peru by an old Indian woman, whose life he had saved. The woman assured Besley the amulet would "protect him from violent death". Payments for the amulet were to be sent to different apartment addresses in downtown London, England.

Besley attributed "his numerous escapes from death during his explorations in East Africa, the Arctic Circle, and through the primeval forests of unexplored South America", which were "inhabited by hostile Indians with poisoned arrow" to his possession of the mascot. The advertisement described the life saving qualities of the amulet, saying "Captain Besley was through the South African War; and at the outbreak of the Mexican Rebellion a few years ago, at the request of President Diaz raised and led a force of 2,000 Yaqui Indians, which kept the field for five months, but was eventually compelled to disband in consequence of lack of ammunition and provisions" and that "his ranch in Mexico was looted by rebels and 30,900 head of cattle and 4,000 horses and mules (were) swept away". There are no contemporaneous newspaper articles that prove these claims.

=== International fundraising promotion ===
In Great Britain, purchasers were asked to send £1 to the "Mascot Day Fund for Private Hospitals" in order to receive a replica of Besley's mascot and be entered into a drawing for the "original" mascot. Besley insisted that regardless of having been won in the final drawing, the original amulet "shall be lent (back) to him (Besley) when the time for his next exploration comes round".

The same replica mascot was offered to readers of Welsh newspapers at a lower cost of 2 shillings with no additional offer. In Belgium, readers of L'Indépendance Belge were told "each buyer (of a replica mascot) will receive entitlement to a raffle ticket whose major prizes will be an automobile and a piano" if purchased for one guinea (one pound and one shilling) before 17 July. After 17 July, the cost of a replica mascot fell to half a guinea. In New Zealand, the promotion was reported as "London's Mascot Day... in aid of private hospitals in need of financial help".

A year later, Besley said he was "getting a replica made" of the amulet that actress Lily Elsie would sell at the 1918 bazaar held at London’s Royal Albert Hall on behalf of Lady Muriel Paget's Blinded Soldier’s fund.

== Cotton crop experiments in Mexico ==
In 1920, "Colonel" Besley experimented with a trial crop of short and long-staple cotton at "his plantation", the San Carlos Ranch, 33 miles south of Hermosillo, Mexico. Besley had partnered with Dr. John Burton, a Hermosillo physician and surgeon. Together they claimed they had planted 1,000 test acres of cotton.

Besley reported the crops were "growing well", that he expected "a big acreage will be planted next year" and predicted "Sonora, Mexico will be one of the greatest cotton growing districts of the Americas".

== Australian bicycle tour ==
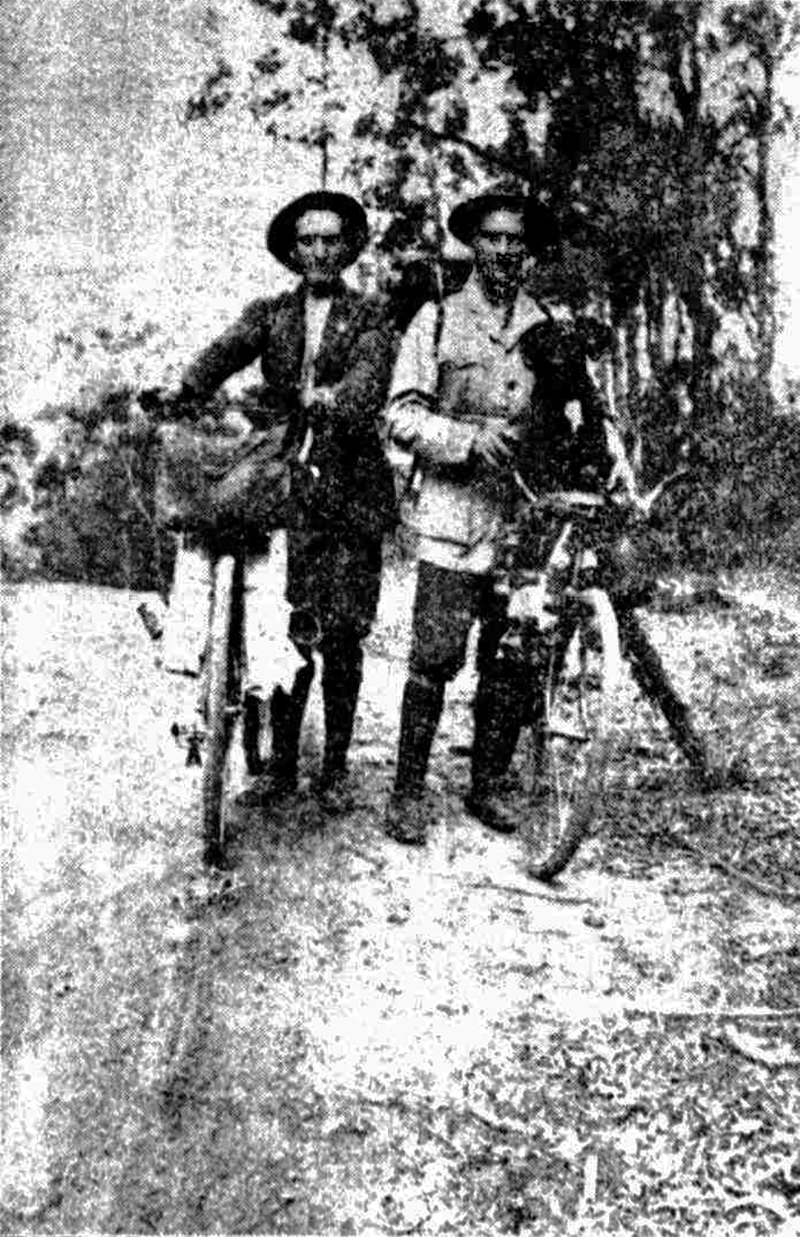
A photo of James Campbell Besley (left) and Percy Skeyhill (right) on their World Bicycle Tour in Brisbane, Australia

In 1924, Besley visited a Brisbane, Australia newspaper claiming he was a veteran of the 7th Infantry Battalion of the British Columbia Regiment of the Canadian Army. He said he and his traveling partner Percy Skeyhill were attempting an around the world bicycle tour, both hoping to win a £1,000 prize.

Besley told a Brisbane Telegraph newspaper reporter the bicyclists could earn the reward if they "circled every country in the world and visited all important towns". One condition of the contest was "they must neither work, beg, borrow, steal nor sell anything other than a small pamphlet describing the object of the tour". Besley claimed he had been born at Bulawayo, Zimbabwe, South Africa and was "well known in Zululand, because of his several exploring expeditions into the heart of Africa".

Besley's fanciful story included an account of how the two travelers had run out of water on the Nullarbor Plain on the Great Australian Bight coast. In order to learn where water could be found, Besley claimed he seized an Indigenous Australian, tied him to Besley's bicycle, and "there he was compelled to drag along after him, of which he soon tired, and leaving the main track led the way to water". Besley said the two planned to finish their tour in seven years, reaching Montreal, Canada in 1931.

== Mexican rubber plantation ==
In 1926, Besley advertised in mid-western newspapers asking investors to assist him in working a 100,000 acre rubber plantation in Sonora, Mexico. The advertisements claimed "great quantities of native rubber near railroad", said a "small amount (investment) needed" and promised "quick returns".

== Sonora, Mexico uprising ==
In 1929, "Colonel" Besley was asked by his friend and fellow polo enthusiast W. Beckford Kibbey to assist in standing against the threat of revolutionary insurgents at Rancho El Alamo, Kibbey's 60,000 acre ranch in Sonora, Mexico. Kibbey had earned a fortune cattle ranching and in the mines near Cananea in Sonora. Rancho El Alamo was described as a "castle-like fortress" built to protect Kibbey's family from "roaming bandits".

Kibbey converted his house into a small fortress preparing against the rebel army commanded by General José Topete and his brother Fausto Topete, the Governor of Sonora. Besley stayed for 17 days, helping Kibbey with the planning and management of the defense of the property and ranch. The insurgency collapsed. The US government sent reinforcements into Sonora to support the Mexican federalists and the expected attack never happened.

== Arizona ranch and Riding Academy ==
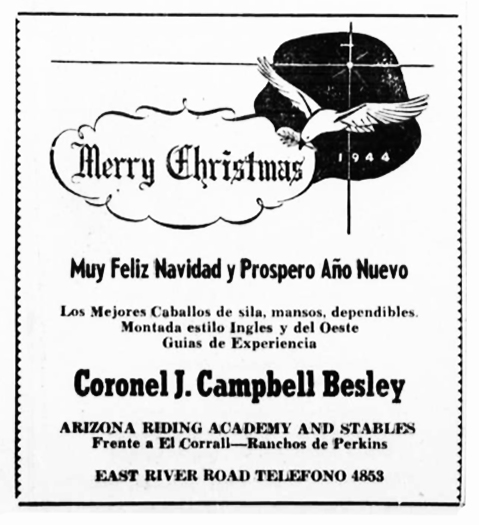
Coronel Besley Riding Academy advertisement from El Tucsonense, 1944-12-22

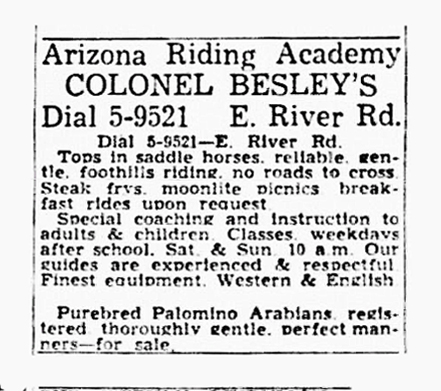
A classified ad for Colonel Besley's Arizona Riding Academy; Tucson Daily Citizen, 21 November 1950

In the 1940s and 1950s, Besley owned the Arizona Riding Academy and Stables in Tucson, Arizona. Besley had been referring to himself as "Colonel" Besley since the 1930s. The first advertisement was placed in the El Tucsonense newspaper. Translated to English, the copy reads "The best saddle horses, meek, dependable. Mounted English and Western style. Experienced Guides".

== Death and burial ==
Besley died on 6 February 1954. He had been living at the St. George Hotel in St. Kilda, Melbourne, Victoria, Australia. His funeral services were held at Tobin's Chapel in Melbourne and his body was buried there in the Springvale Botanical Cemetery on 1 March 1954.

== Publications ==
- Besley, James Campbell (1914). The Captain Besley Expedition from Pacific to Atlantic: Across Unexplored South America. Philharmonic Hall.
