= El Tiradito =

- U.S. National Register of Historic Places
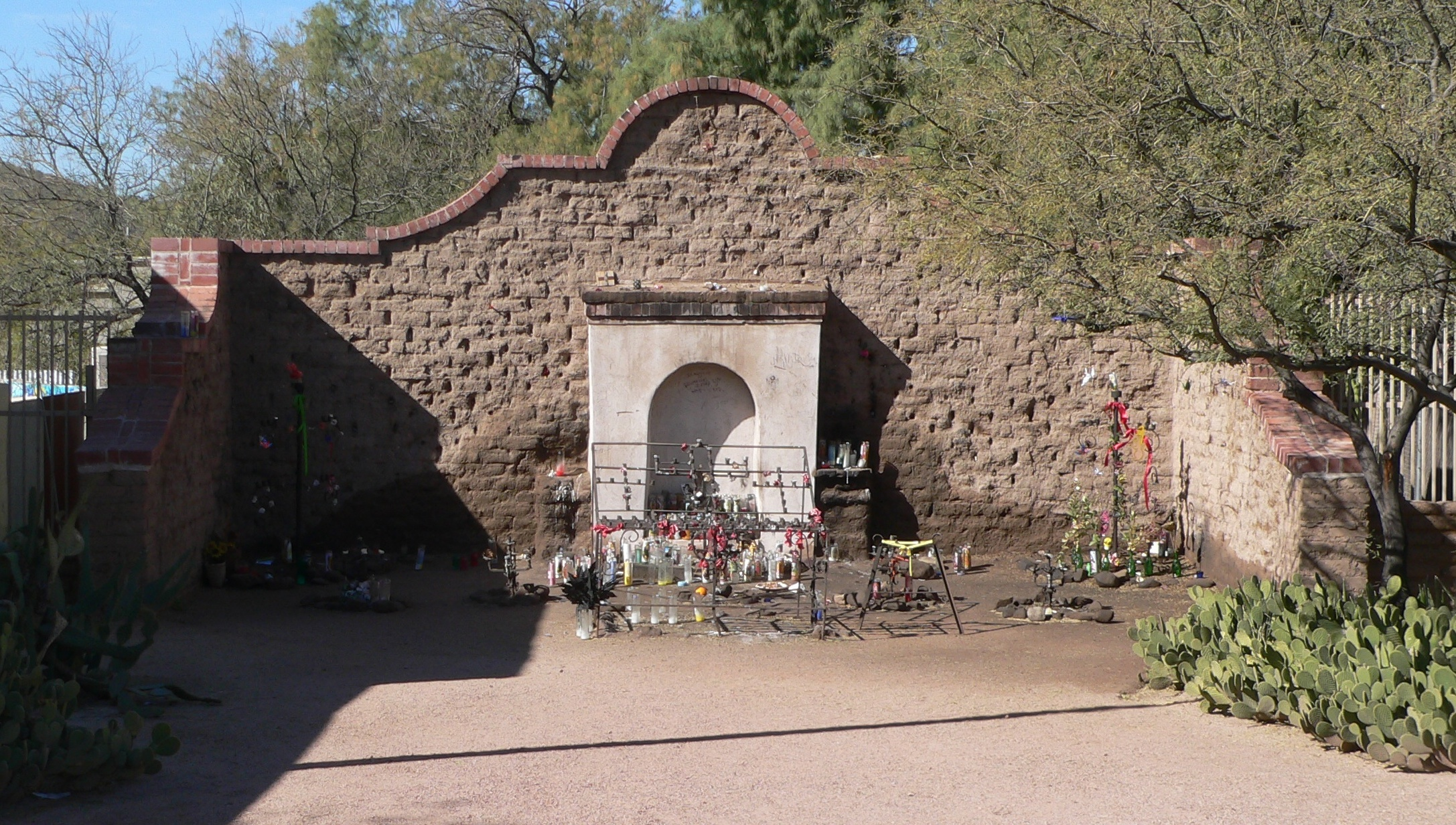

- Location within Arizona
- Location: 420 South Main Ave, Tucson, Arizona
- Coordinates: 32°12′58.2″N 110°58′29″W
- Built: 1871
- NRHP reference No.: 71000115
- Added to NRHP: November 19, 1971

El Tiradito ("the little castaway") is a shrine and popular local spot located at 420 South Main Avenue in the Old Barrio area of Downtown Tucson, Arizona. Because of the site's association with pleas for supernatural intervention, it is also called the Wishing Shrine. The legends surrounding the site center around a broken-hearted man dying and, due to a sin, being unable to be buried on consecrated ground. The legends date to the 1870s, and the shrine has been present since at least 1891. Its name comes from the Spanish "tirar." The shrine was the first Arizona property to be placed on the National Register of Historic Places for its traditional cultural values. It is especially important to Tucson's Mexican and Mexican American communities.

The shrine consists of the crumbling remains of a brick building, with a large metal rack for candles and desert plants now occupying the interior. Large, glass-encased candles, frequently depicting saints of the Roman Catholic Church are lit and left burning at the shrine, both on the stand and along the ledges of the building. Small slips of paper containing prayers or messages of thanks are also often pressed into cracks in the walls or left elsewhere at the shrine, as are other memorial objects. In addition to the faithful who leave these religious objects, El Tiradito is frequented and favored by many Tucsonans, including writers, poets, and other members of the town's artistic community.

The Tucson Chamber of Commerce calls the el Tiradito "the only sinner to become a saint." The site is not sanctioned by the Catholic Church, yet has religious and cultural significance. The victim gained a reputation for being able to mediate petitions to God and grant miracles.

Every year, there is a large Day of the Dead celebration at the shrine.

== Legend ==
The legend associated with the site varies– the University of Arizona's Southwest Folklore Center contains over twenty versions of the story. The story generally occurs in the 1870s or 1880s. It was first recorded in an 1893 newspaper article and then in a 1909 diary. The identity of the victim in the story changes based on the story: some say he was good, bad, a hapless victim, or a priest. The victim is suddenly killed and buried where they fell, on unconsecrated ground. There is often a love triangle, with one or two of the participants killed in a fit of passion. Author Stella Pope Duarte describes the story as ""the 'Romeo and Juliet' of the Latino world."

One version associates the site with a ranch hand named Juan Oliveras. This legend says that Oliveras had an affair with his mother-in-law. His father-in-law caught and killed him. His mother-in-law, unable to bury him on consecrated ground due to his sin, buried him near where he fell. Another version says Oliveras had an affair with his stepmother, and was killed by his own father. Religious neighbors brought candles to the site where he was buried.

Another story claims that a man fell in love with a beautiful woman from a far. When he learned she was betrothed to another, he committed suicide. Because of the Catholic Church's prohibition of suicide victims burial in consecrated ground at the time, he was buried where he died, and his friends and family brought candles and flowers. A third claims a man, looking for his long-lost father, met his stepmother; his father, not recognizing him, killed his son in jealousy.

Other versions include a man who was thrown from a train, a man killed by a stray bullet, a man killed by his family after he assaulted a girl, a man killed by local sheriffs who mistakenly believed him to be a criminal, a son who killed his father who did not want him to sell the family horse, and a son who killed his father to avenge his mother.

== Creation of shrine ==
Visitors to this area light candles for the man, hoping his soul will be freed from purgatory. Some of the nooks and crannies of El Tiradito even house the notes and letters of the heartbroken, prayers asking for healing of the heart. Legend says that if a candle burns through the night at the shrine, the lighter's wish will be granted. Some locals pray there "for help where blood had been spilled and a lost soul had gone forth to confront the unknown."

The original shrine was destroyed to build a highway, but was rebuilt in 1927 on land donated for its construction by prominent Tucsan Teófilo Otero. The structure was built in 1940 as a part of the Neighborhood Youth Administration.

In 1971, Tucson announced plans a highway that would cut through Barrio Viejo, destroying the shrine and displacing around 1200 residents. Residents formed The El Tiradito Committee. They enlisted Tucson Legal Aid to argue on their behalf and campaigned to get El Tiradito listed on the National Register of Historic Places. El Tiradito was listed on the U.S. National Register of Historic Places in 1971. A foundation was created to maintain the shrine, promote cultural events, and support the neighborhood. It was documented in the Historic American Landscapes Survey in 2012.

== Site of mourning and activism ==
El Tiradito is also a site of mourning. It was used for this purpose as early as 1980, when a Catholic priest organized a vigil there for the Salvadoran Organ Pipe deaths. Beginning in 2000, Tiradito has hosted a weekly vigil to memorialize migrants who die trying to cross the Sonoran Desert. This vigil is run by the immigration advocacy group Coalicion de Derechos Humanos, No More Deaths, and Interfaith Immigrant Coalition. It considers the mourned "new tiraditos, the new discarded ones." Activists leave bottles of water there in memory of those who died of hunger and thirst. The site is also used for protests against alleged abuses by immigration and local authorities.

After the Orlando nightclub shooting, a vigil was held at El Tiradito in memory of its victims.

The Sex Workers Outreach Program meets there on the International Day to End Violence Against Sex Workers to commemorate those who were killed.

== Physical structure ==
The structure is about fifteen feet tall and thirty feet wide. It has two sides descending in staggered segments.
