= Elgin Bryce Holt =

American geologist, mine owner, engineer

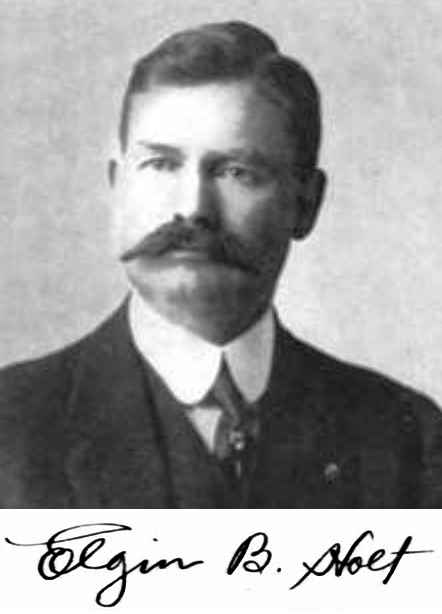
- Born: Elgin Bryce Holt; September 4, 1873; Harrison, Arkansas, United States
- Died: October 6, 1945 (aged 72); Los Angeles, California, United States
- Occupation(s): Geologist, Mine Owner, Mining Engineer, Amateur Scientist and Anthropologist, Entrepreneur

Elgin Bryce Holt (September 4, 1873 – October 6, 1945) was an American geologist, mine owner and engineer, amateur scientist, anthropologist and entrepreneur who reorganized and managed the Cerro de Plata Mining Company in Magdalena, Sonora, Mexico.

== Biography ==
Holt was born in Harrison, Arkansas, the sixth of Lydia Elizabeth (née Ryan) and "Judge" Isham Right Holt's eight children. In 1879, the family moved to a homestead raising cattle along the San Francisco river near Alma, New Mexico. In 1892, the family moved to Las Cruces, New Mexico, allowing the four youngest children to attend the New Mexico Agricultural College. Very successful in mining silver in Mexico, he was known as the "Silver King of Sonora". A member of the American Institute of Mining Engineers and the American Association of Engineers, Holt died in Los Angeles, California and is buried in Forest Lawn Cemetery.

=== Education ===
In 1897, Holt was a member of the fourth graduating class of the New Mexico College of Agriculture and Mechanic Arts (now New Mexico State University) having completed the Mining Engineering course. He earned degrees in Geology and Mineralogy. His senior thesis was entitled "The Potassium Cyanide Method of the Determination of Copper".

During his senior year Holt was manager of the college football team and editor-in-chief of the New Mexico Collegian in 1897, the college student newspaper.

== Early career ==
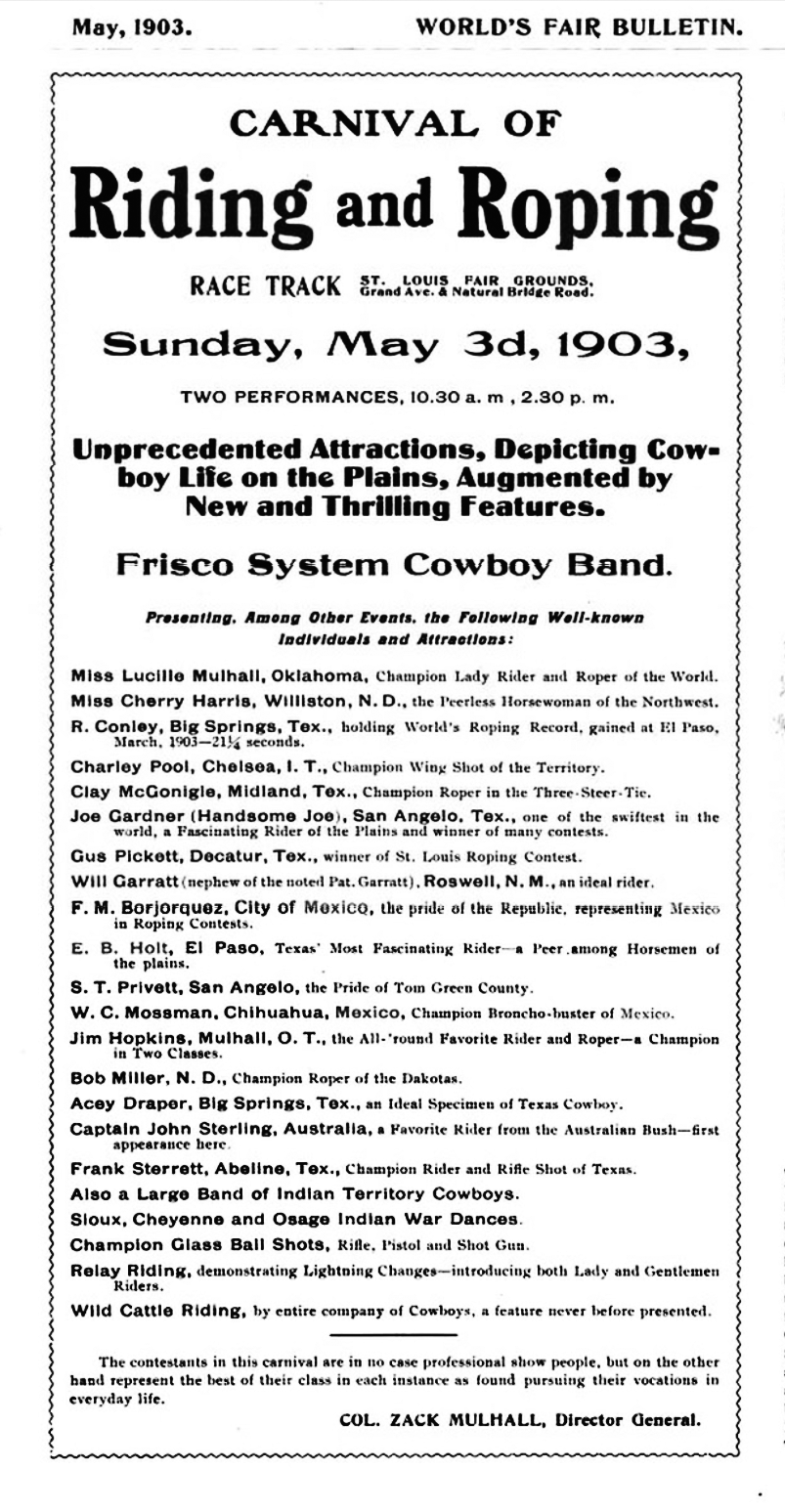
Advertisement for Zach Mulhall's Congress of Rough Riders and Ropers - 1904 World's Fair Bulletin

In 1903, Holt and a former classmate W. C. Mossman, left for the 1904 World's Fair in St. Louis, Missouri, to join Zach Mulhall's Congress of Rough Riders and Ropers in the show's "broncho riding act".

Holt began his career renting his father's cattle business, working the family herd with his brother Isham for six years. During that time, Holt completed a post-graduate course in assaying.

Holt's older brother Ernest had a number of mining interests in Sonora, Mexico but was killed in 1900 by a revolver that was said to have fallen from his cot and exploded. Holt sold his cattle and traveled to Sonora, Mexico in 1902 to investigate his brother's mining holdings, which had passed to the Yaqui Gold Company.

After serving as Deputy Sheriff of Cochise County, Arizona in 1903 and 1904, Holt traveled to Santa Ana, Sonora, Mexico in June, 1905.

== Mining career ==
In 1909 Holt and his brother Walter formed the Holt Bros. Mining Engineers company in Magdalena. They also operated an assay office in the same location, allowing them to hear about developments in the mining regions of Sonora.

The brothers prospected for themselves. They made a rich strike of silver at the Compania mine west of Noria Station. The three inch vein of ore was said to be 30% silver.

They also managed mining operations at a number of area mines, including the Sierra Prieta copper mine in Magdalena. In 1909 Holt also served as superintendent and general manager of the Cabrillo Mining company, located 30 miles west of Estacion Llano in Sonora, Mexico. Holt had "discovered and taken charge" of the property in 1907. He ran a tunnel under the "antigua patio process" mine that had played out and discovered chloride silver ore that ran as high as 600 ounces per ton. The property had suffered from a lack of water necessary to mine. Holt sank a 50' well shaft, providing all necessary water for the project.

In 1911, Holt incorporated the Arizona-Sonora Mines Company in Nogales, Arizona to manage a high quality gold strike at the Juan Cabral mining property near Tucabe, Magdalena. Holt's listed address was Magdalena, Sonora, Mexico.

== Silver mining success ==
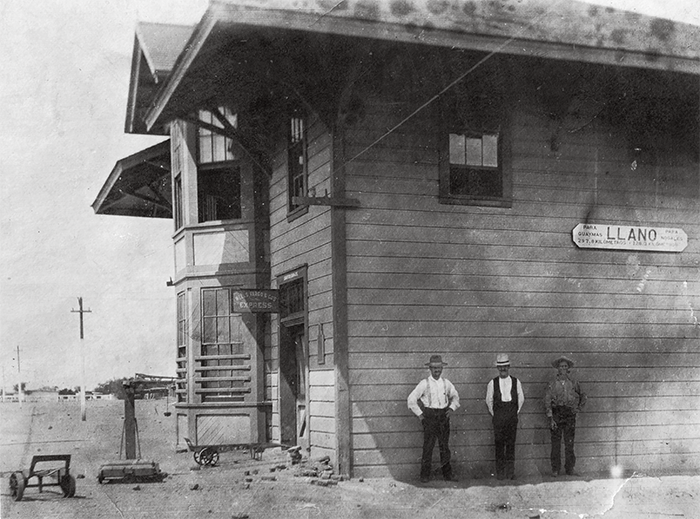
Walter Holt, Elgin Holt, James Campbell Besley at Wells Fargo office, Estacion Llano, Sonora, Mexico

The Holt brothers met James Campbell Besley, a mine broker from nearby Hermosillo. In 1909 Besley had sold the Cerro de Plata mine, located in Sonora, Mexico, 25 miles southwest of Nogales to a group of Kentucky investors. After two years of disappointing results, the investors had asked Besley to find a purchaser for the mine. Besley brokered a deal with the Holt brothers who purchased the 150 acre mine. Holt said he started the mine with an "absurdly small cash capital of $ 200", adding "we have made the mine literally pay its own way".

In July 1912, Holt made a deal with Roy & Titcomb, Inc. of Nogales, Arizona to build a mill and cyanide plant for treatment of silver ore from the Cerro de Plata mine. Acting as general manager of the mine, Holt claimed "five hundred thousand dollars of silver is in plain sight at the Cerro de Plata mine".

The mill was started November 5, 1912. Mine development and ore shipments continued until thirty one lots of high grade ore had been shipped, mostly in railcar loads, aggregating more than 1400 tons and averaging 117 ounces of silver to the ton. 26,000 ounces of fine silver in the form of bars and precipitates were shipped to the Selby Reduction & Refining Works, near San Francisco, California during the first five weeks' production. In one section the silver content of the ore was assayed as high as 150 ounces to the ton.

Holt was soon shipping 25,000 ounces of silver a month, then worth $ .61 per ounce for a total of $ 15,250 (equivalent to $496,887 in 2024 - adjusted for current inflation) per month. The success of Holt's operation resulted in his expanding the mine's processing capabilities, erecting a larger 100-ton mill and cyanide plant.

In 1913, Holt and his brother Walter reorganized the US Cerro de Plata Mining Company, combining it with the Mexican corporation Cerro de Plata Mining Company S.A.. James Campbell Besley, Roy & Titcomb, Inc. and Francis J. Hobson were named initial stockholders of the new corporation.

Mexican revolutionaries stopped Holt on March 10, 1913, while he was transporting silver bullion from the mine to Nogales, Arizona. Traveling in an automobile under heavy guard, Holt was held up by 250 men. Holt and his party "were relieved of all arms and ammunition but otherwise unmolested, as the leader stated they did not want the bullion, only arms".

A November 1913 newspaper article reported a 200% increase in net production receipts at the Cerro de Plata mine, growing from $7,000 realized in the month of October to an estimated monthly profit of $14,000 (equivalent to $445,407 in 2024) from the production of "the little old dinky plant now in use". The article mentioned plans of doubling the production capacity at the mine.

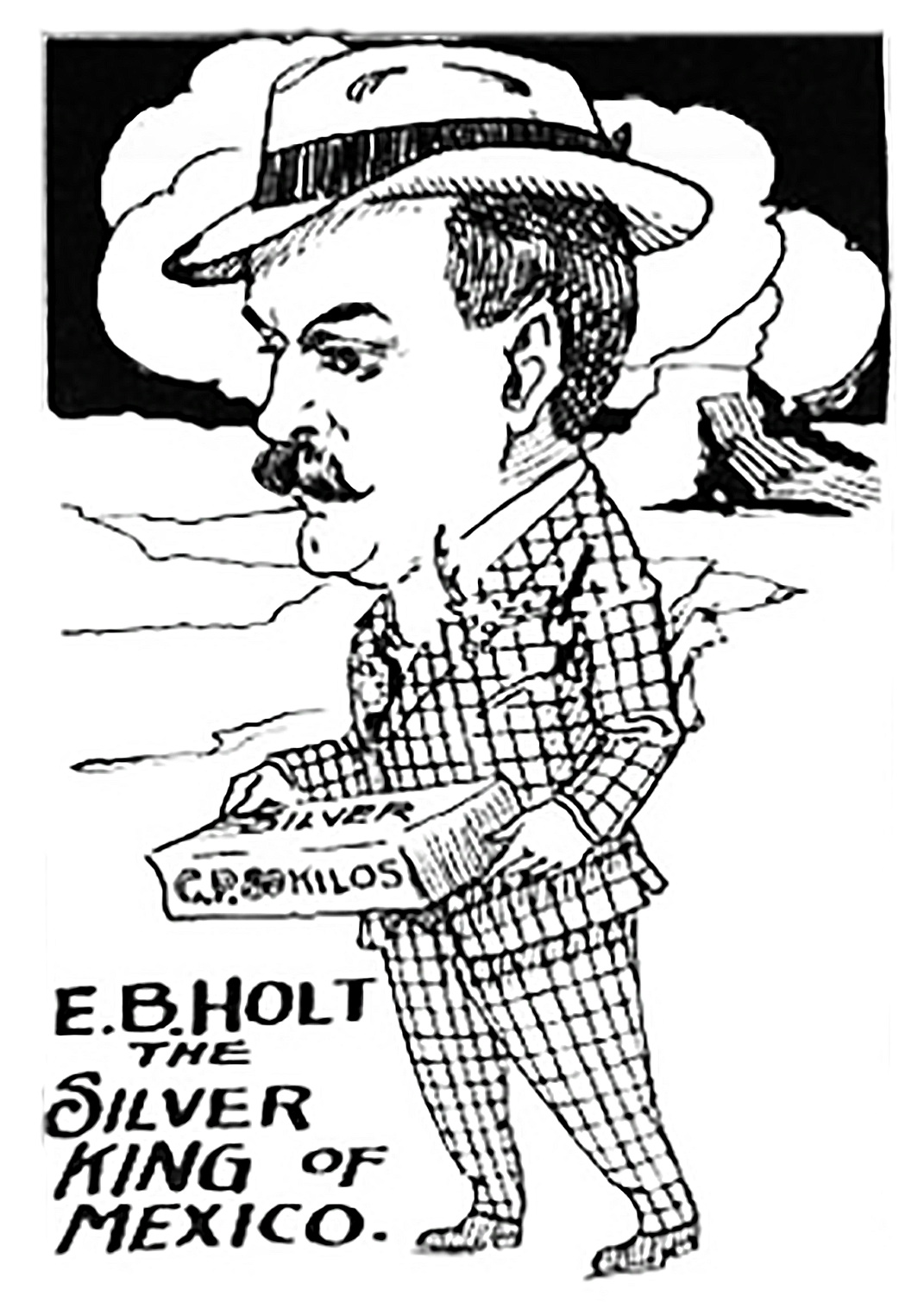
Caricature of E B Holt portraying him as the "Silver King of Mexico"

In 1914, the Cerro de Plata mine was reported to be a "silver bonanza" and "one of the coming big bonanzas of Mexico". Holt was president and manager of the mine and his brother Walter was secretary and treasurer.

Holt displayed 16,000 ounces of silver bullion taken from the Cerro de Plata mine in December 1914. The bullion, estimated at the time being worth over $8,000 (equivalent to $251,136 in 2024) was displayed in the window of the International drug store in Nogales, Arizona along with a silver "Savior on the cross" cast from the same refined silver ore. The display was taken to Phoenix, Arizona a week later, shown at the American Mining Congress. Holt was the delegate from Santa Cruz county, Arizona.

By 1915, Holt was referred to as the "Silver King of Sonora". Holt claimed "during these (past) three years we have had a total production of nearly 700,000 ounces of silver" and "we already have 1,000,000 ounces of silver blocked out above the 300 foot level and will begin further sinking soon".

In 1916, Holt was personally supervising the extraction of lead and silver ore from the Wandering Jew mine group in Santa Cruz County, Arizona. The ore was hauled by wagon to Patagonia, Arizona and shipped to El Paso, Texas for processing.

Bandits, said to be Yaqui insurgents burned the Cerro de Plata Mining Company store in October 1916. They destroyed the company assaying office and shot at the company caretaker, killing his mule. Holt estimated the loss at $1,000. The ore tailing mill and cyanide plant were not damaged.

It was reported Holt still owned silver mines in the Sonora area in 1920.

== Later career ==
=== Mine engineering consultant ===
In 1921, Holt was developing mining properties in San Luis Gonzaga, Sinaloa, Mexico. Holt was a director of the Mexican Metals Recovery Co., incorporated in Arizona in 1922. The company was headquartered in El Paso, Texas. In 1937 Holt held an option to develop the Mowry mine, located in Santa Cruz County, Arizona.

=== Arizona State mining engineer ===
Holt worked as a district mine engineer for the Arizona State Department of Mineral Resources. His initial assignment was to compile and codify rules and regulations regarding mining on the various federal and state classifications of land in Arizona. His reports on state mining activity were often printed as news stories in prominent newspapers.

Holt was one of two of the state Department of Mineral Resources's four field engineers that lost funding in 1945 by a veto cast by Governor Sidney Preston Osborn during budget cuts.

== Amateur scientist ==
=== Anthropology ===
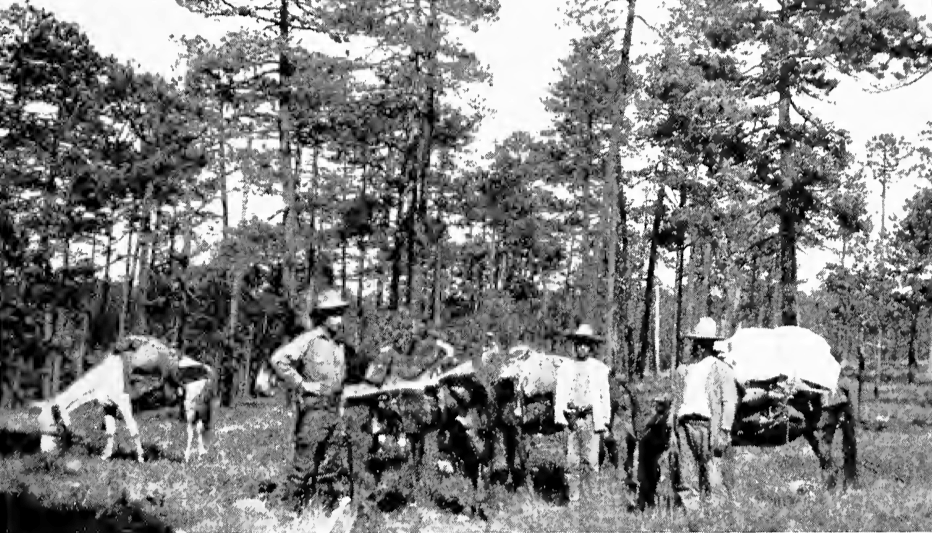
Elgin Bryce Holt, crossing the Sierras in Chihuahua, Mexico. Holt is the figure on left.

Holt's article "Cliff Dwellers of the Mexican Sierra Madre" was published in the November, 1926 Bulletin of the Pan American Union. The article explored the greater part of the Sierra Madre from the Rio Aros, in the State of Chihuahua, to southwestern Durango, bordering the State of Nayarit.

=== Entomology ===
Holt reported two new types of ichneumon fly in 1895 and 1896. In September 1895, Holt found a female example of a new type of ichneumon fly at Ardmore, South Dakota which the US Department of Agriculture named Paniscus clypeatus. Deemed a new species, the insect was described as "distinct in the entire lack of scutellar carinae and its strongly transversely elevated clypeus".

Holt also reported another new type of ichneumon fly in the spring of 1896, a female example taken at Las Cruces, New Mexico. Named at the time Paniscus pulcher by the US Department of Agriculture, the insect was deemed a new species and described as being "very distinct in the entire lack of scutellar carinae and the highly contrasting color of the thorax".

Holt collected an example of Gorytes hamatus, a sand fly at Las Cruces, New Mexico in 1896. His collected insect is listed in Contributions to the Entomology of New Mexico: Volume 1.

Holt also provided the United States National Museum an example of a Dasymutilla Pseudopappas mutillidae wasp, taken in the Mesilla Valley of New Mexico in 1896.

=== Paleontology ===
Holt donated fossil and mineral specimens he had found in the Arizona and Mexican desert. Among them were "exceptionally choice samples of cassiterite (mineral tin oxide)" he found in Durango, Mexico and donated to the University of Nebraska Uni Museum in 1926.

He donated fossil crocodile and phytosaur specimens to the American Museum of Natural History in 1936. He also donated Temnospondyli fossils found at St. Johns, Apache County, Arizona to the American Museum of Natural History.

== Death and burial ==
Apparently despondent due to a long bout of ill health, Holt attempted suicide on October 5, 1945, by repeatedly hitting himself in the head with a hammer. He was then a resident of Los Angeles, California. First treated at Georgia Street Receiving Hospital, Holt was later transferred to Los Angeles General Hospital where he was diagnosed with a skull fracture. He died the next day, October 6, 1945. His funeral rites were held on October 10, 1945, in Los Angeles.

Holt is buried in Forest Lawn Memorial Park in Glendale, Los Angeles County, California.
