= Barrio Libre =

- U.S. National Register of Historic Places
- U.S. Historic district
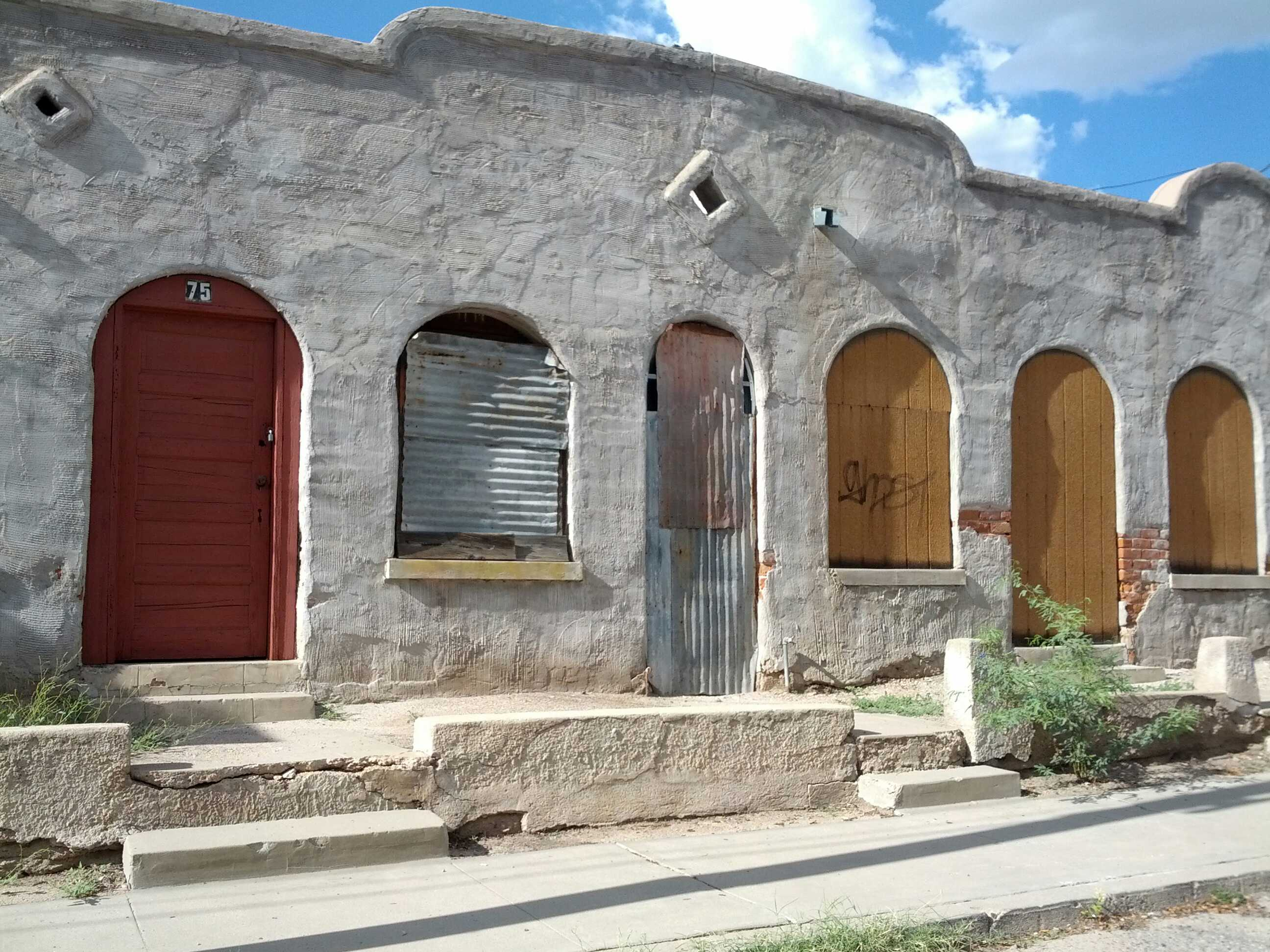
- Building in Barrio Libre in 2012

- Location within Arizona Location within the United States
- Location: Roughly bounded by 14th, 19th, Stone and Osborne Sts., Tucson, Arizona
- Coordinates: 32.21412°N 110.97282°W
- Area: 77 acres (31 ha)
- Built: 1885
- Architectural style: Bungalow/craftsman, Queen Anne, Sonoran Adobe
- NRHP reference No.: 78000565
- Added to NRHP: October 18, 1978

Barrio Libre is a neighborhood in Tucson, Arizona notable for its existence as a relatively unchanged 19th-century Hispanic neighborhood of close-packed row houses. Houses in the barrio are typically adobe with very plain detailing, reflecting the area's history as a district of townhouses for Mexican ranching families.

The location of the district shifted through history. In 1881, Barrio Libre was directly south of Tucson's business district. It was known as being where "the lower class of Mexicans and the Papago [Tohono O'odham] and Yaqui Indians held high or low carnival without being interrupted by officers of the law." By 1940, Barrio Libre had shifted south, and the former area was known as La Calle Convento or La Calle Meyer. In 1960, James Officer moved the neighborhood's boundary north to Broadway. Thomas Sheridan's 1986 map of local barrios put Barrio Libre further south, on the other side of 22nd street, though Sheridan noted the vague determinations of Barrio Libre's location.

The district, as delineated by the National Park Service, includes more than 200 contributing structures, with relatively few non-conforming buildings. The district is bounded by 14th and 18th streets to the north and south, and by Stone and Osborne to the east and west. Meyer Avenue runs through the center of the barrio.

It is also known as Barrio Viejo or the Barrio Histórico.

In the late 1960, the Tucson Convention Center was built, obliterating much of the neighborhood.

Barrio Libre has a dense population of murals.

The district was listed on the National Register of Historic Places on October 18, 1978.

== Notable structures ==
- El Tiradito
- Teatro Carmen
