= El Tucsonense =

Spanish-language newspaper from Tuscon, Arizona, U.S.

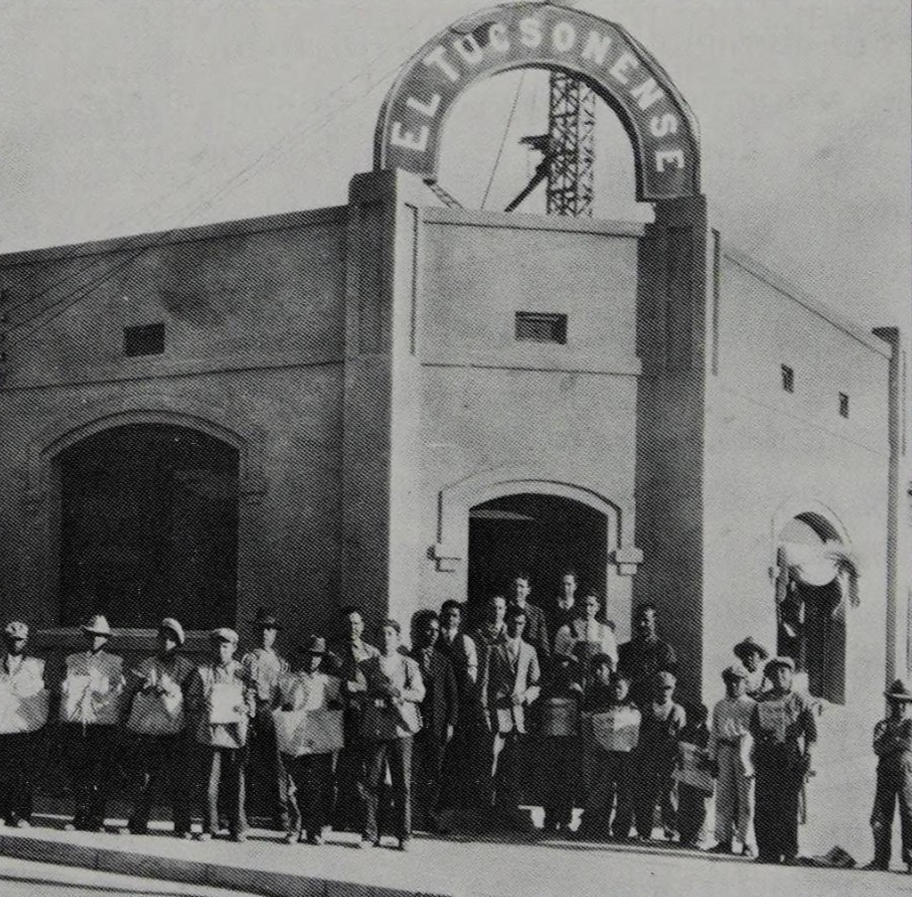
- Staff of the newspaper in 1925
- Type: Weekly newspaper
- Editor: Ricardo Fierro (last)
- Founded: 1915
- Ceased publication: 1963
- Language: Spanish
- Headquarters: Tucson, Arizona

El Tucsonense was a newspaper written for a Spanish-speaking audience published in Tucson, Arizona. It was Tucson's first Spanish-language newspaper.

Written primarily for a middle class audience, it was opposed to labor activism and strikes, and in favor of assimilation and restraint in deportations. Overall, it was written with the goal of promoting a sense of American identity among Mexican-Americans (then called Spanish-Americans, distinct from non-citizen Mexicans) and did not refrain from criticizing mistreatment of Mexican laborers.

The newspaper was published variously as triweekly, biweekly, weekly.

The paper used masthead designs including Mission San Xavier del Bac, the Tucson skyline, and its own print shop.

== History ==
Its founder, Francisco Santos Moreno, was born in Hermosillo, Sonora and was an apprentice of Charles Tully, founder of the Arizona Daily Star. He founded his own paper in 1915, and by 1922 moved into its main print shop. After Moreno's death in 1929 the paper was managed by his wife and sons. Its last editor was Ricardo Fierro.

With the advent of Spanish-language radio and television, the paper lost its audience and went out of business.
