= Amos Hochstein =

American businessman and diplomat (b. 1973)

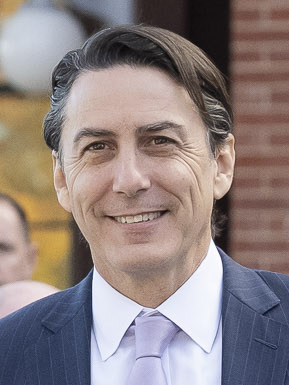
- Hochstein in 2024

Deputy Assistant to the President and Senior Adviser for Energy and Investment
- In office 2022 – January 20, 2025
- President: Joe Biden

Senior Advisor for Energy Security
- In office August 10, 2021 – January 20, 2025
- President: Joe Biden

United States Special Envoy and Coordinator for International Energy Affairs
- In office August 1, 2014 – January 20, 2017
- President: Barack Obama
- Preceded by: Carlos Pascual
- Succeeded by: Francis R. Fannon (Assistant Secretary of State for Energy Resources)

Personal details
- Born: January 4, 1973 (age 53) Jerusalem
- Party: Democratic
- Spouse: Julie Rae Ringel
- Children: 4
- Occupation: Businessman; diplomat

Military service
- Branch/service: Israel Defense Forces
- Unit: Armored Corps

Amos J. Hochstein (born January 4, 1973) is an American diplomat, businessman, and former lobbyist. He was a top national and economic security official in the Biden administration. Hochstein has worked in the U.S. Congress, has testified before congressional panels and has served in the Barack Obama administration under Secretaries of State Clinton and Kerry. He was appointed Deputy Assistant Secretary of State in 2011 and as Special Envoy and Coordinator for International Energy Affairs in 2013. In 2015, President Barack Obama nominated Hochstein to be the Assistant Secretary of State for Energy Resources but the Senate did not act on the nomination. While at the State Department, Hochstein worked as a close advisor to Vice President Biden. He served in the administration from 2011 to 2017.

In March 2017, Hochstein joined Tellurian, a private Houston-based LNG company, where he served as senior vice president for marketing until his departure in September 2020. He is a former member of the supervisory board of Ukraine's Naftogaz, from which he resigned in October 2020, writing an opinion piece that highlighted the return of sabotage in the form of corrupt forces. Hochstein has served on the boards of the Atlantic Council and U.S.-India Business Council.

On August 10, 2021, United States Secretary of State Antony Blinken announced that he would be appointing Hochstein as the senior advisor for energy security, and he was subsequently appointed special presidential coordinator for global infrastructure and energy security. He also led Biden's Partnership for Global Infrastructure and Investment, and advised the president on AI policy and infrastructure.

In March 2025, Hochstein became a managing partner at the investment firm TWG Global to bring his experience developing energy and infrastructure to support the company's artificial intelligence investments.

== Early life ==
Hochstein was born in Jerusalem, the child of American Jewish immigrants to Israel. He studied at Yeshivat Netiv Meir High School and the Shalom Hartman Institute in Jerusalem. He was drafted into the Israel Defense Forces and served in Armored Corps. Following his service, he left Israel and moved to New York City to work at Bankers Trust. While Hochstein's immediate family continue to live in Israel, he does not maintain dual citizenship, having renounced his Israeli citizenship.

== Career ==
Hochstein was a foreign policy adviser to Democratic Party members of the U.S. government House Foreign Affairs Committee from 1994 to January 2001.

=== Partner at TWG Global ===
Hochstein became a managing partner at TWG Global in March 2025. In his role he will support the investment strategy into energy and infrastructure as part of the firm's larger plans for AI growth and partnerships.

== Advising Congress ==
On Capitol Hill, Hochstein first served on the U.S. House Committee on Foreign Affairs staff from 1994. In subsequent years he served in a variety of senior level positions, including the House International Relations Committee, where he served as Senior Policy Advisor. In 1997, he was sent to North Korea to report on the country's economic and military status as well as the progress and opportunities for humanitarian aid efforts.

Later, Hochstein served as the Senior Policy Advisor to the Foreign Affairs Committee of the U.S. House of Representatives. Hochstein first served as the principal Democratic staff person on the Economic Policy, Trade & Environment Subcommittee where he oversaw work authorizing Ex-Im Bank, OPIC and USTDA, as well as drafting legislation on export controls and trade-related multilateral organizations and regimes.

Hochstein also worked as a Senior Policy Advisor to then-Governor Mark Warner, and later as Policy Director for Senator Chris Dodd. He joined Dodd's team in the beginning of 2007 and was the Policy Director during his 2008 Presidential campaign.

Hochstein was also an aide to Representative Sam Gejdenson. During his time on Capitol Hill, Hochstein travelled to Iraq and was involved in U.S. back-channel diplomatic discussions to potentially lift U.S. economic sanctions in exchange for the potential resettlement of several thousand Palestinian refugees in Central Iraq. Hochstein argued that the economic sanctions had to be maintained while conceding that it was necessary to "humanise" those sanctions.

=== Cassidy & Associates ===
Hochstein later moved to the private sector as Executive Vice President of International Operations at Cassidy & Associates. Throughout his career, he was a counselor and lobbyist for both domestic and international oil and gas companies, as well as companies focusing on renewable energy. In this capacity, he assisted corporations in assessing potential new markets and the development of alternative sources of power.

==== Equatorial Guinea ====
While employed at Cassidy & Associates, Hochstein also worked on the account of the president of Equatorial Guinea, Teodoro Obiang Nguema, Africa's longest-serving dictator, to improve relations with the United States. In his 2012 book Private Empire: ExxonMobil and American Power, journalist Steve Coll recounts that, while Hochstein was initially uncomfortable with the Equatorial Guinea account, he assisted, together with the U.S. National Security Council, in the development of a "road map" of political changes that Equatorial Guinea would have to implement in order prove their sincerity and improve relations with the U.S. The road map involved prisoner releases, along with substantial public investments in health care and education, and Hochstein coordinated communications about these points with Equatorial Guinea's leadership and the State Department.

Hochstein and others, among them Secretary of State Condoleezza Rice and Paul Wolfowitz, said they were convinced of Obiang's will to change and adapt. Hochstein defended the Obiang regime in an interview with The Washington Post, stating that democratization in countries like Equatorial Guinea must be supported, and that Western states cannot expect changes of long-standing political realities to happen overnight. Nevertheless, Equatorial Guinea under the Obiang regime remains by many accounts one of the world's least free countries. Hochstein eventually resigned from the lobbying account, but continued to work for Cassidy until 2006.

=== Energy diplomat for the Obama administration ===
Hochstein began working at the U.S. Department of State in 2011, joining the newly formed Bureau of Energy Resources. Serving as deputy to Special Envoy Carlos Pascual, Hochstein worked to help Ukraine find new supplies of natural gas in the wake of the 2014 Russian occupation of Crimea.

He oversaw the Office of Middle East, Asia and Europe, the Western Hemisphere and Africa. Hochstein led the energy related diplomacy efforts.

==== Special envoy and coordinator of international energy affairs ====
On August 1, 2014, Hochstein succeeded Carlos Pascual as acting Special Envoy and Coordinator of International Energy Affairs, and was permanently appointed to the position later in the year by Secretary Kerry. As the Special Envoy, Hochstein oversaw the Bureau of Energy Resources and advised Secretary of State John Kerry on global energy security and diplomacy, as well as integration of renewable and clean energy and related security matters. He also worked closely with officials at the White House's National Security Council and other government agencies.

In his capacity as the U.S.'s Chief Energy Diplomat, Hochstein had an important role in shaping foreign energy and security policy and worked closely with U.S. Vice President Joe Biden, accompanying him on international travel and advancing energy as a key U.S. foreign policy tool. Hochstein and Biden worked together on the Caribbean Energy Security Initiative, Central America Energy Security Task Force, Cyprus and East Mediterranean, as well as securing Ukraine and Europe from Russian energy dominance.

Hochstein encouraged European countries to find new oil, gas, coal, and nuclear sources, to alleviate their dependence on Russian energy. In response to President Vladimir Putin's plans for new gas pipelines, including Nord Stream 2 via the Baltic Sea and TurkStream via the Black Sea, to bypass an existing transit coordinator through Ukraine towards Greece, Italy and Germany, Hochstein described the plans as "political projects that have questionable economic value" to the European energy market. He has also stated that the U.S.'s position isn't to exclude Russia from the European market entirely, but rather that Russia should be an equal player, remarking that "European countries should be able to choose their supplier and force their suppliers to compete for their business. That is what is good for energy security of Europe, economic security and ultimately for the national security of those countries involved." In November 2021, he accused Russia of taking advantage of the European energy crisis and making no effort to alleviate the situation.

Hochstein has also been involved in the U.S. front against the Islamic State of Iraq and the Levant, specifically cutting their oil revenues by disrupting their production lines. Hochstein oversaw the U.S. efforts to cripple Islamic State's energy business by weakening oil trade between ISIS, the Syrian government and other parties. His team coordinated with the U.S. Department of Defense to determine targets. Airstrikes subsequently blew up over 1,000 tanker trucks and other key targets. In a testimony before the Senate Foreign Relations Committee, Hochstein described the military actions as "not only more bombings, but a different kind of bombing."

Prime Minister Benjamin Netanyahu cited Hochstein's work as helping to provide an incentive for the renewed relationship between Israel and Turkey. This followed his work to revive efforts to settle maritime border dispute between Lebanon and Israel. At the conclusion of his visit, Hochstein made statements stressing his visit was to discuss delayed gas exploration in Lebanon. In October 2022, he managed to negotiate a maritime deal between Lebanon and Israel following months of negotiations, settling the Israeli–Lebanese maritime border dispute. Previous to that in 2014, Hochstein helped “pave the way” for the $500 million natural gas agreement between Israel and Jordan visiting Jordan 14 times and was, alongside Israel's former president Shimon Peres, a "key broker" for the gas export deal. This agreement concluded an effort that Secretary of State Clinton began in 2011.

In response to Russian officials claiming that the Turkish government was illegally buying oil from the Islamic State, Hochstein dismissed these claims, saying that "I do not believe there is significant smuggling between ISIL-controlled areas and Turkey of oil of any significant volume."

Hochstein has also worked on multilateral energy affairs, meeting with Urban Rusnák, Secretary-General of the Energy Charter Conference, to discuss progress on the Energy Charter Process, discussing the advance of clean energy investments and energy security with government officials in India and meeting several other state leaders and government officials to coordinate energy and security matters with states like Azerbaijan and Saudi Arabia and other states in the Middle East.

==== Assistant secretary of state for energy resources ====
On October 8, 2015, President Barack Obama nominated Hochstein to be the assistant secretary of state for energy resources, the official chief position for the bureau. Hochstein continued his efforts in all previously engaged fields of national and international energy and security matters, including sanctions against Iran, energy opportunities in Latin America, the U.S.-India energy cooperation, the U.S.-China energy cooperation, the administration's strategy on Russia, and the fight against ISIS.

He also was involved in discussing and mapping out details of the Southern Gas Corridor project generally and the Trans Adriatic Pipeline with Greece specifically.

He authored the White House Caribbean Energy Security Initiative and chaired President Obama's U.S.-Caribbean and U.S.-Central America Energy Security Task Force. He also continued to lead U.S. efforts to promote global fuel switching to natural gas and develop stronger natural gas markets in Asia and South Asia. He headed the State Department's Unconventional Gas Technical Engagement Program, formerly known as Global Shale Gas Initiative.

He was succeeded by Frank R. Fannon, now Assistant Secretary of State for Energy Resources.

Since leaving the White House, Hochstein appeared on a Trump White House panel promoting the use of natural gas and LNG fossil fuels at the 2016 Bonn Climate Change Conference.

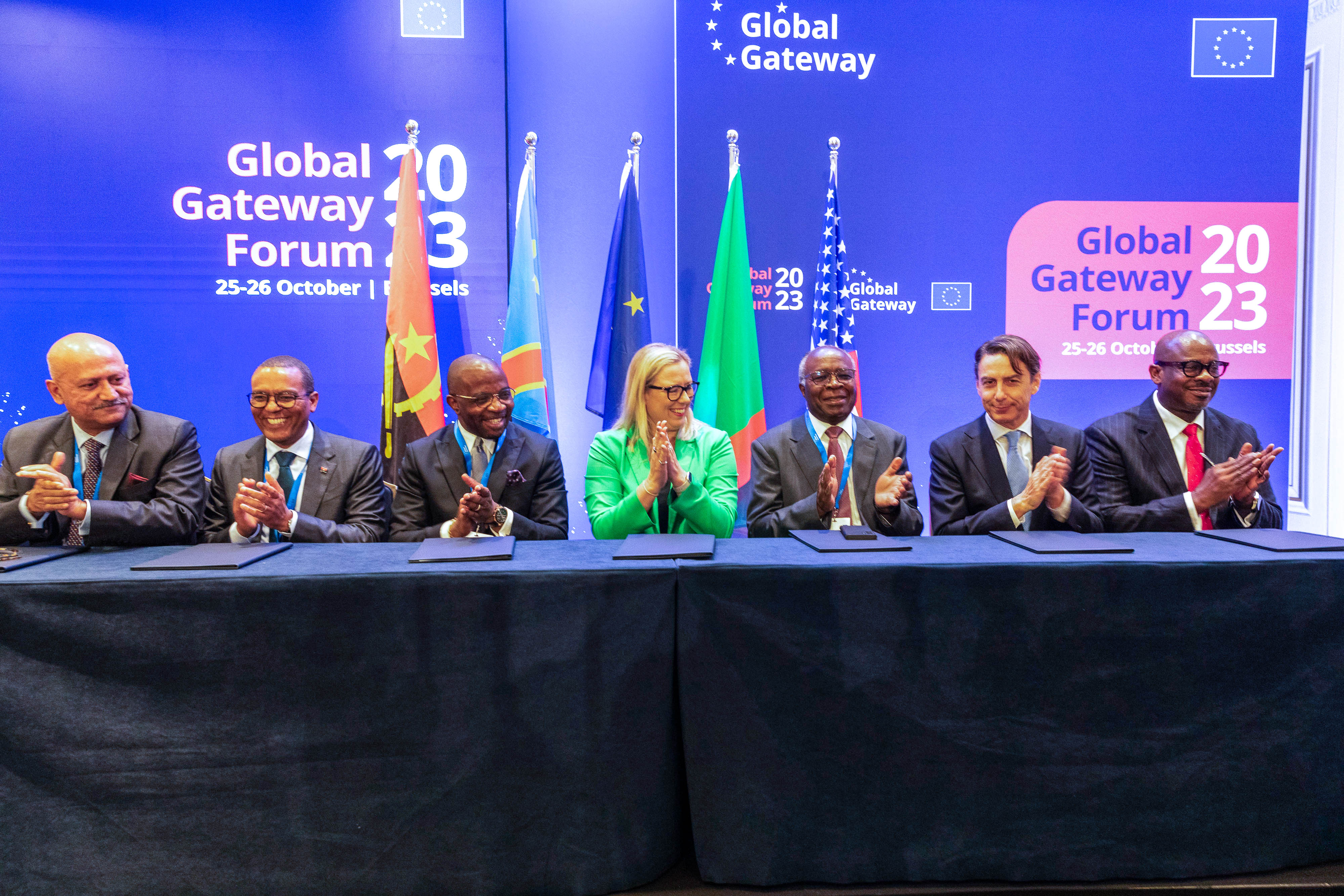
Amos Hochstein at the Global Gateway Forum in Brussels on October 26, 2023

=== Executive at Tellurian ===
In 2017 Hochstein joined Tellurian, a private LNG-gas company, as EVP of Marketing, from which he resigned in September 2020.

=== Senior advisor on energy security for Biden administration ===
Per a US State Department Spokesperson, Hochstein "is not a dual national." The State Department declined to comment on whether Hochstein formerly held Israeli citizenship and renounced it, a practice that dual citizens sometimes engage in in order to take on more sensitive positions in the US government. According to the Washington Post, Hochstein was a very close aide of President Joe Biden. Former U.S. State Department official David Goldwyn said that Hochstein acts as “the person who bridges State, Treasury, the White House and Energy.” In June 2022, The Washington Post reported that Hochstein was serving as President Biden's top energy advisor, or “energy whisperer,” in both domestic and international energy issues. In 2022, Hochstein "helped shape" the White House effort to reduce gas prices during the height of the Russian invasion of Ukraine, and throughout 2022 often traveled with Biden to overseas meetings.

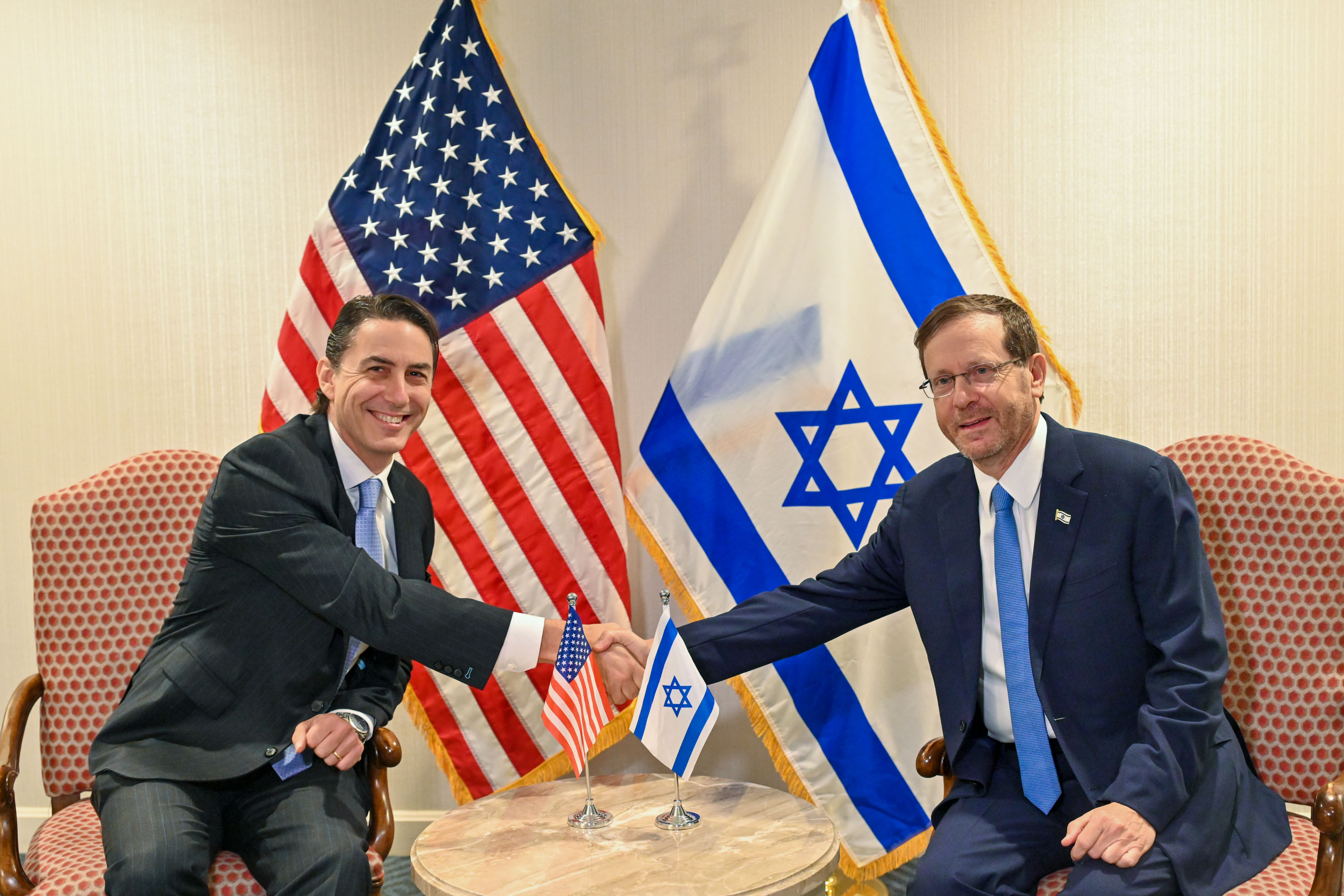
Hochstein with Israeli president Isaac Herzog on October 25, 2022

Visiting Lebanon in late 2022, Hochstein was lead negotiator of a maritime deal between Lebanon and Israel meant to "pave the way for offshore gas exploration." The deal resolved a decades-long dispute between Israel and Lebanon surrounding the two countries' maritime border and the gas fields located there. With U.S. Secretary of State Antony Blinken calling the agreement "historic," Israeli prime minister Yair Lapid tweeted: "On behalf of the State of Israel, I thank American mediator @AmosHochstein for his hard work to bring about this historic agreement."

Hochstein served as Biden's special presidential coordinator for global infrastructure and energy security until 2023 when he moved to the White House as deputy assistant to the president and senior advisor for energy and investment. He also leads Biden's Partnership for Global Infrastructure and Investment, which launched at the 2022 G7 summit with the aim of coordinating the international supply chain of clean energy.

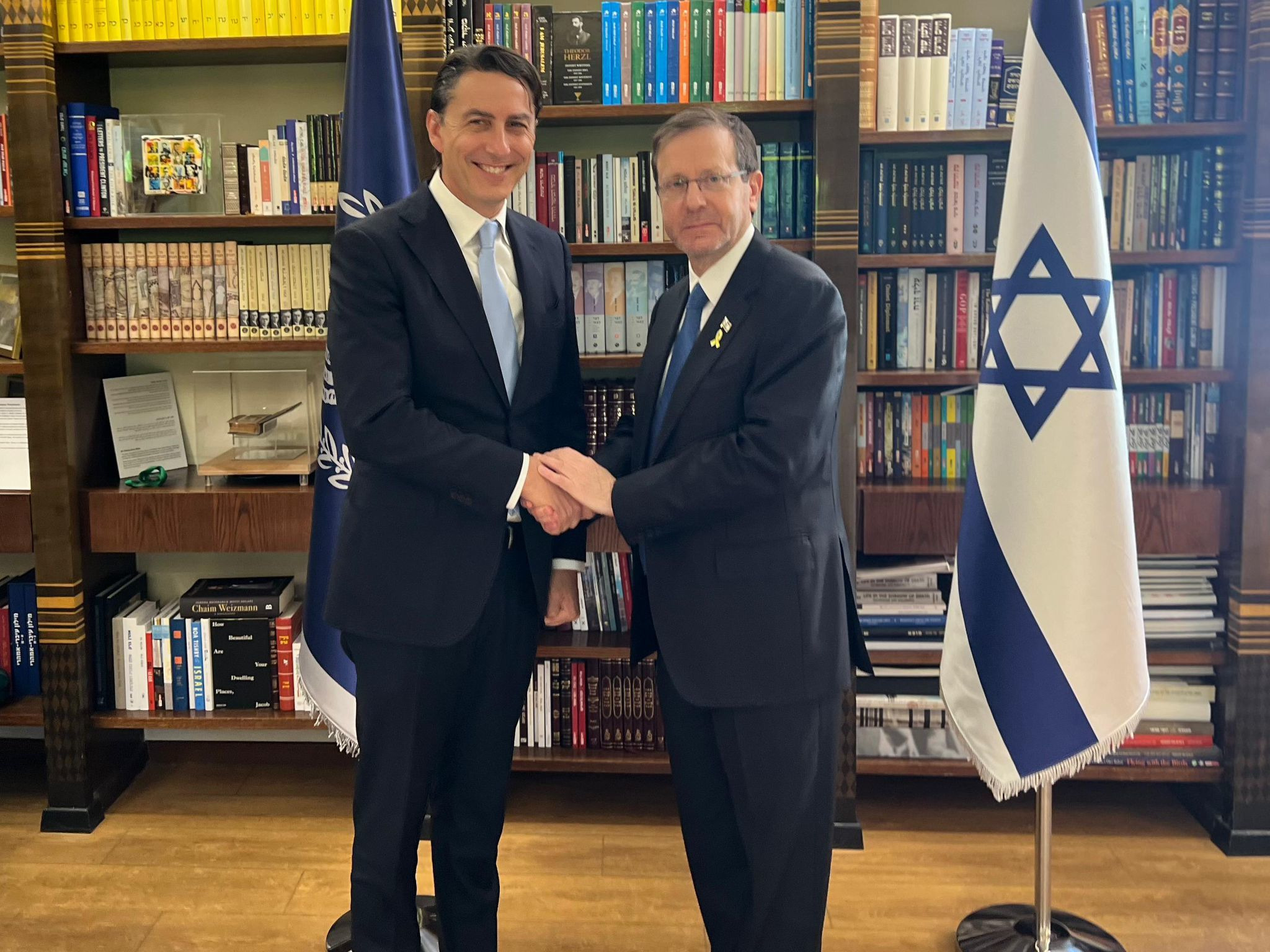
Hochstein with Israeli President Herzog on June 17, 2024

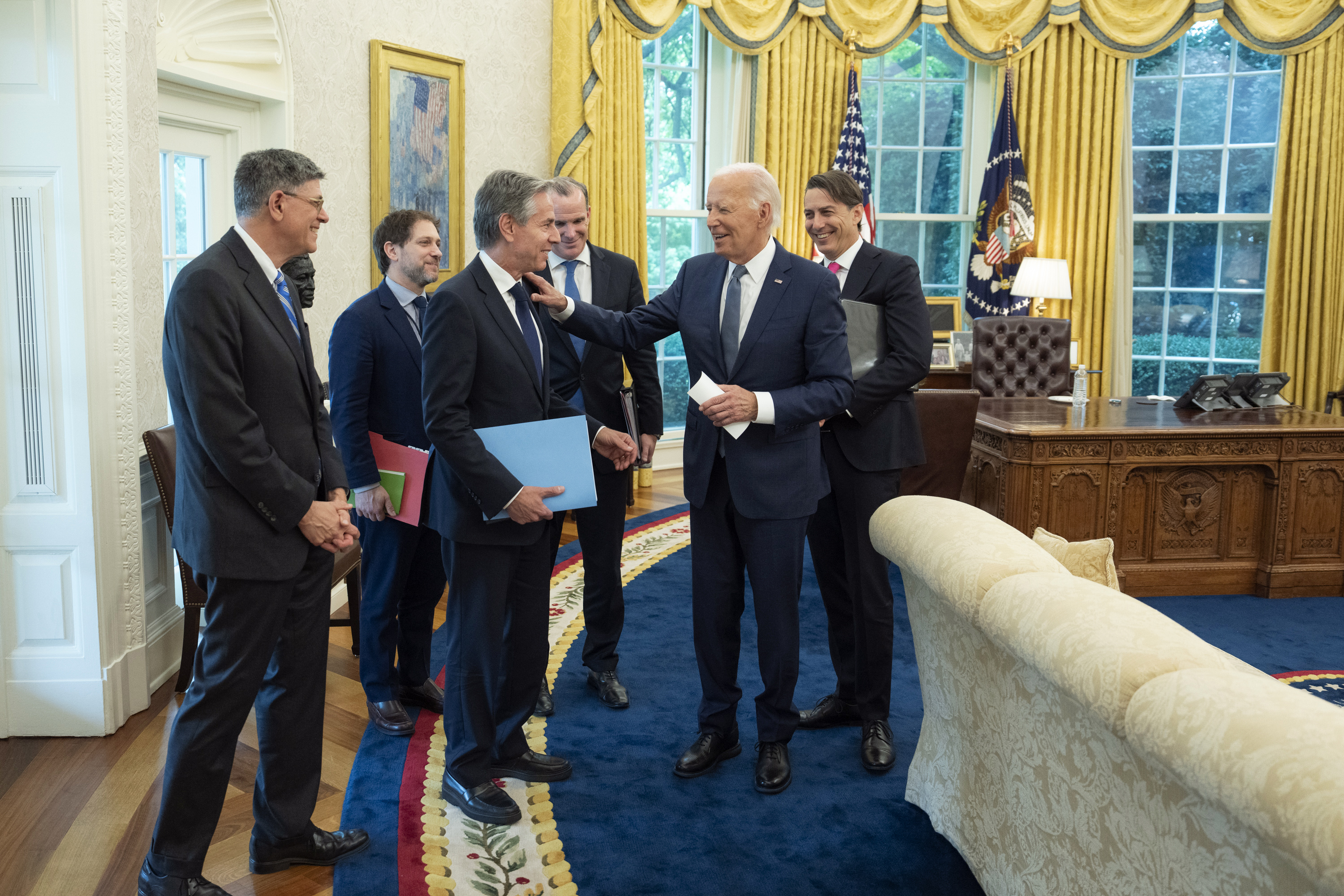
Hochstein with Joe Biden, Antony Blinken, Brett McGurk and Jonathan Finer on July 25, 2024

During the Israel–Hezbollah conflict, Hochstein made multiple trips to Lebanon as a special U.S. envoy in order to negotiate a resolution to the conflict. His strategy was to push Hezbollah to pressure Hamas into accepting a ceasefire agreement to end the Gaza war. In the case Israel and Hamas were to reach such a deal, Hezbollah had promised to in turn end its attacks on Israel.

On 17 and 18 September 2024, thousands of handheld pagers and walkie-talkies used by Hezbollah simultaneously exploded across Lebanon and Syria. The attack came just a day after Hochstein visited Israel and warned Prime Minister Benjamin Netanyahu against provoking a major escalation in Lebanon.

== Energy and foreign policy positions ==
Hochstein sees renewable energies as very important and being at the center of both the future's energy market and U.S. energy policy. He is of the opinion that the realistic transition into a fully renewable resourced energy mix will take some time and that the use of cleaner resources (e.g. LNG to replace heavy crude oils) for this transition period is crucial to sustain economic developments and growth. Hochstein said: "Here in Washington, I think we are the last city on the planet…where we still talk about fossil fuel versus renewables as some kind of zero-sum game […] It is not one or the other. It is going to have to be both because we are going to need the baseload and we are going to need the fuels that will transition us to the future."

At the 2015 Renewable Energy Transition event hosted by the International Renewable Energy Agency (IRENA) and the Atlantic Council's Global Energy Center, Hochstein stated that "unlike oil and gas, the technological advances we’re seeing in renewables are making them cheaper and better." He further said: "U.S. energy security, energy sustainability and climate objectives are mutually reinforcing. As such, we are working to promote energy efficiency, conservation and transformation of energy systems. We are encouraging market reforms, such as the elimination of fossil fuel subsidies, that can address overall energy demand."

Hochstein has been interviewed by national and international media, commenting on national and international energy policy, energy security, and foreign policy. Due to environmental and economic considerations, the Biden administration and the subject have opposed the proposed EastMed pipeline in favor of an Egyptian route.

== Memberships ==
Hochstein is a former member of the board of the Atlantic Council and the U.S.-Indian Business Council.

Hochstein is a former member of the supervisory board of the Ukrainian energy company Naftogaz. He was appointed in 2017 and resigned in October 2020 claiming that the Ukrainian government was returning to corrupted practices vis-a-vis the company.

In October 2019 Hochstein was mentioned by former U.S. officials in relation to the Trump–Ukraine scandal. It was reported that as early as May 2019 Hochstein alerted the National Security Council staff that Rudy Giuliani and Gordon Sondland's pressure tactics were rattling Ukrainian president Volodymyr Zelenskyy. It was also reported that Rick Perry planned to have Hochstein replaced as a member of the board at Naftogaz with someone aligned with Republican interests. Perry denied the reports.

== Personal life ==
Hochstein is married to Julie Rae Ringel. They have four children together, and live in Washington D.C. His wife works for the Georgetown University Continuing Education School, in the executive leadership coaching program.

Hochstein identifies as a Modern Orthodox Jew.

Political offices
Preceded by Carlos Pascual	United States Special Envoy and Coordinator for International Energy Affairs; 2014–2017	Succeeded by Francis R. Fannon as Assistant Secretary of State for Energy Resources
