= Pyatt =

Pyatt is a surname. Notable people with the surname include:

- Brad Pyatt, American football player
- Bud Pyatt, American mathematician
- Chris Pyatt, British boxer
- David Pyatt, British musical prodigy
- Geoffrey R. Pyatt, diplomat
- Nelson Pyatt, ice hockey player
- Taylor Pyatt, ice hockey player
- Tom Pyatt, ice hockey player
