= Virginia E. Palmer =

American diplomat (born 1963)

Virginia Palmer
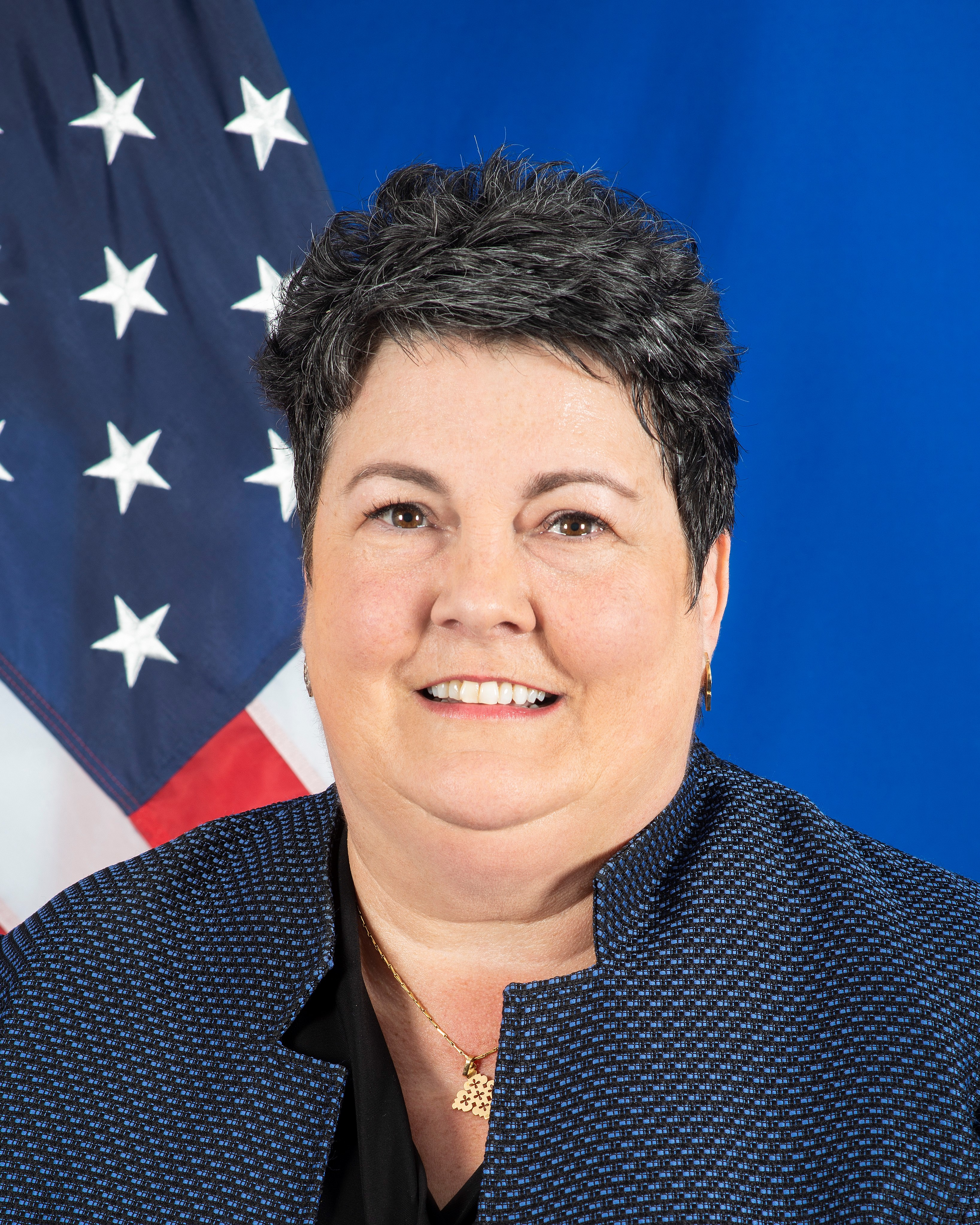
- Official portrait, 2022

United States Ambassador to Ghana
- In office May 10, 2022 – May 28, 2025
- President: Joe Biden; Donald Trump
- Preceded by: Stephanie S. Sullivan

Assistant Secretary of State for Energy Resources
- Acting
- In office January 20, 2021 – September 7, 2021
- President: Joe Biden
- Preceded by: Francis R. Fannon
- Succeeded by: Harry R. Kamian

United States Ambassador to Malawi
- In office February 27, 2015 – June 7, 2019
- President: Barack Obama; Donald Trump
- Preceded by: Jeanine Jackson
- Succeeded by: Robert K. Scott

Personal details
- Born: 1963 (age 62–63)
- Spouse: Ismail Asmal
- Children: 2
- Education: Georgetown University (BS); University of Virginia (MA)

Virginia Evelyn Palmer (born 1963) is an American diplomat who had served as the United States ambassador to Ghana. Palmer is the former United States ambassador to Malawi. She was nominated by President Barack Obama and confirmed by the Senate, beginning that assignment in January 2015.

== Early life and education ==
Palmer is the daughter of Becky and Richard Palmer, who was a professor of drama at Washington University in St. Louis. She grew up in University City, Missouri, and graduated from University City High School. She attended Georgetown University and earned a Bachelor of Science in foreign service in 1983. She then earned a Master of Arts at the University of Virginia in 1986. Palmer also attended Washington University in St. Louis.

== Career ==
In 1986, following completion of her graduate studies, Palmer joined the United States Foreign Service. Her early assignments included serving as consular officer at the U.S. Consulate in Calgary, Canada, and as economic officer at the U.S. Embassy in Beijing, China. International assignments also include ones in Zimbabwe, Hong Kong, Kenya and Vietnam. She was director of the Bureau of East Asian and Pacific Affairs's Office of Economic Policy from 2004 to 2005. From 2005 to 2008 she served in the Department of State as the deputy coordinator for counterterrorism.

=== Ambassador to Malawi ===
When she was nominated by President Barack Obama to be U.S. ambassador to Malawi, she was deputy chief of mission at the U.S. embassy in Pretoria, a position she had held since 2011. In that role, Palmer welcomed Obama as he visited three nations in Africa, when she explained to local media, "This visit highlights the potential of Africa and our President to interact and highlight the role of the 600 American companies that are already operating in South Africa and are creating jobs in South Africa."

Delays in the Senate kept her nomination, as well as those of many other ambassador nominees, from being approved. The American Foreign Service Association expressed concern that delays in Senate proceedings were putting the U.S. at risk because of the absence of ambassadors in countries engaged in "the war on Ebola", the killer virus which dominated the 2014 United States–Africa Leaders Summit.

In 2014 Palmer released $6,000 from the Ambassador's Special Self-Help Fund to the secondary school in Bolero, Rumphi to allow a library to be constructed.

Palmer was succeeded by Robert Scott on August 7, 2019. From November 4, 2019, she served as principal deputy assistant secretary for the Bureau of Energy Resources. Palmer was appointed as the acting assistant secretary of state for energy resources on January 20, 2021, by President Joe Biden.

=== United States Ambassador to Ghana ===
On July 2, 2021, President Joe Biden announced his intent to nominate Palmer to be the next United States Ambassador to Ghana. On July 13, her nomination was sent to the Senate. On September 29, a hearing on her nomination was held before the Senate Foreign Relations Committee. On October 19, 2021, her nomination was reported favorably out of committee. On December 18, 2021, her nomination was confirmed in the Senate by voice vote. She presented her credentials to foreign minister Shirley Ayorkor Botchwey on May 10, 2022.

== Personal life ==
In addition to English, Palmer speaks Chinese and French. Palmer is married to Ismail Asmal, who is also a Foreign Service officer. They have two daughters.

Diplomatic posts
Preceded by Jeanine Jackson	United States Ambassador to Malawi; 2015–2019	Succeeded by Robert K. Scott
Preceded by Stephanie S. Sullivan	United States Ambassador to Ghana; 2022–present	Incumbent
