= 2022 French protests =

- Part of protests against Emmanuel Macron
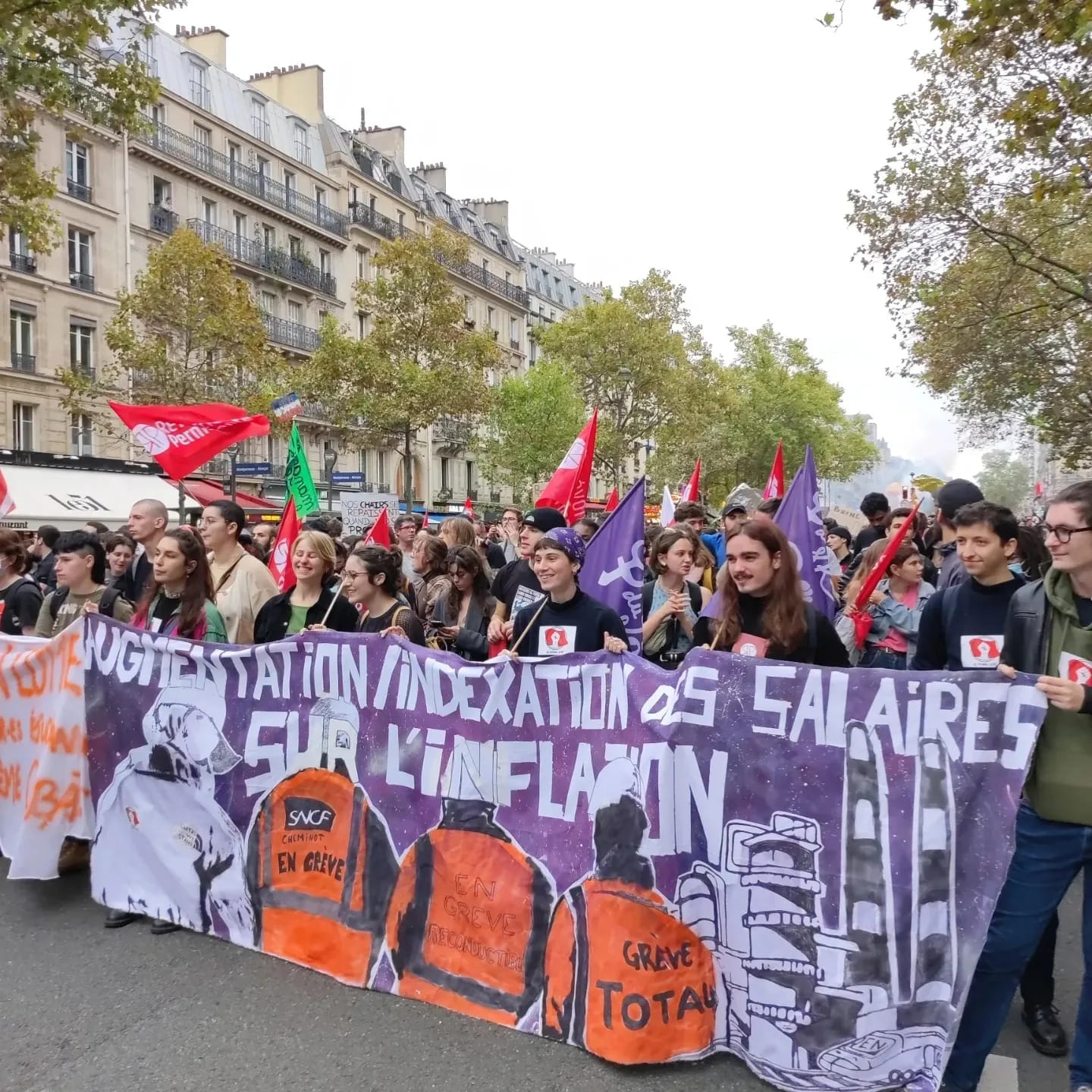
- Procession of Révolution Permanente on 16 October 2022, in a demonstration for supporting the strikers
- Date: 16 October – 10 November 2022 (3 weeks and 4 days)
- Location: France
- Caused by: Rise of living costs
- Methods: Strike action; Blocking traffic; Disabling traffic; Rioting

Thousands of people across France came to the streets in October 2022, launching a statewide strike against the rise in the cost of living. The demonstrations erupted following weeks of "walkouts" that have crippled oil refineries and caused gasoline shortages. The demonstrations have been described by Caroline Pailliez and Clotaire Achi of Reuters as the "stiffest challenge" for Emmanuel Macron since his re-election in May 2022.

== Background ==
According to the French Prime Minister Élisabeth Borne, on 18 October less than a 25% of petrol stations across France were experiencing shortages, which was less than the 30% per cent previously on 7 October. Strike action and unplanned maintenance had led to more than 60 per cent of France's refining capacity – or 740,000 barrels per day (bpd) — being offline which in turn forced the country to import more amid the increased energy costs due to the global supply uncertainty. Strikes have further erupted into other sectors such as energy, "including nuclear giant EDF, where maintenance work crucial for Europe’s power supply will be delayed." There have been weeks of strikes at oil refineries for higher salaries which led to calls for a nationwide and general strike.

French President Emmanuel Macron criticized the United States, Norway and other "friendly" natural gas supplier states for the extremely high prices of their supplies, saying that Europeans are "paying four times more than the price you sell to your industry. That is not exactly the meaning of friendship."

== Timeline of the demonstrations ==
=== 16 October ===
The first demonstrations occurred on 16 October 2022, when tens of thousands of people marched in Paris to protest the rising cost of living, during an increasing political situation manifested by strikes at oil refineries and nuclear power plants that threatened to spread. Annie Ernaux, winner of the 2022 Nobel Prize in Literature, known for as an "outspoken supporter of the left", participated in the demonstrations. Jean-Luc Mélenchon, the leader of leftist party La France Insoumise (France Unbowed), was also among the participants.

=== 18 October ===
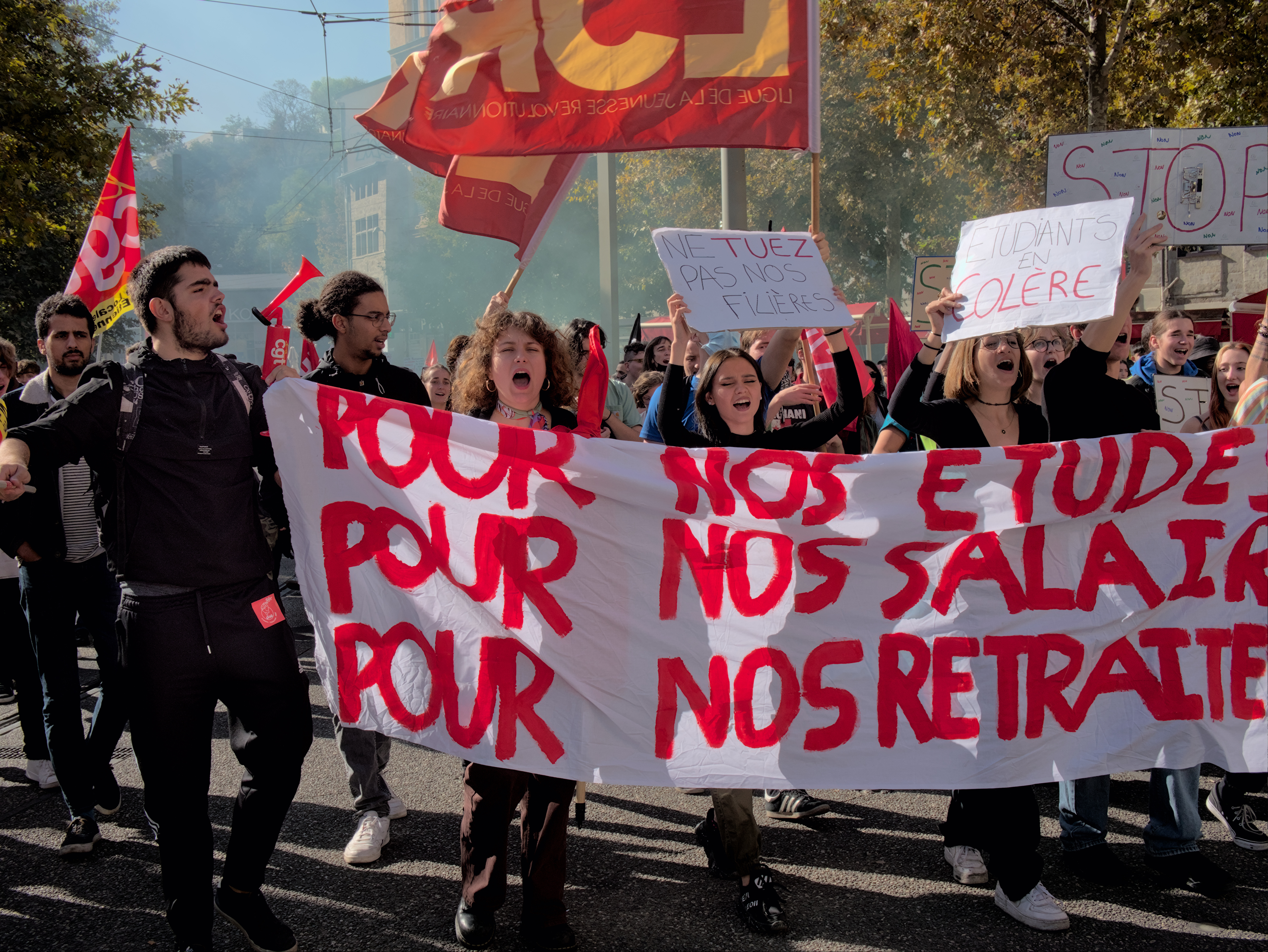
Students at the demonstration of 18 October 2022 in Saint-Étienne, France.

On Tuesday, transportation workers, as well as some high school teachers and public hospital personnel, demonstrated in dozens of locations across France. According to the French interior minister, 107,000 people participated in the protests following calls from leftwing parties. A number of black-clad protesters clashed with the Police and smashed shop windows with 11 protesters being arrested in Paris. Other estimates stated that over 300,000 people participated in the protests. Accordingly, thousands protested in Bordeaux, Le Havre, Lille, Marseille, Lyon, Toulouse, and Rennes, while union leaders estimated that 70,000 people marched in Paris.

Students protested outside hundreds of additional schools across the nation on Tuesday morning. Protesting students voiced their support for striking refinery workers and opposition to the Macron administration's policies. "We are here against the repression and police violence that are only increasing," said a student speaking to L’Est Republicain. Numerous students also demonstrated in opposition to the government's "discriminatory anti-Muslim legislation and deepening cuts to national education". In French public schools, young Muslim women are strictly prohibited to cover their hair or face using any type of fabric.

=== 25 and 27 October ===
Certain unions called for fresh strikes to be taken on 10 November.

== Analysis ==
Some lawmakers stated that the purpose of the demonstrations was to exert pressure on the administration since "a high-risk week began in the National Assembly, where Mr. Macron no longer has an absolute majority." According to Kacper Kita, analyst and journalist, it is "entirely possible" that the protests could become violent, "especially because the economic situation can get worse and the energy crisis can get worse in the coming weeks and months."

== See also ==
- 2023 French pension reform strikes
- 2022 Europe inflation protests
- Regional effects of the 2021–2022 global energy crisis
- 2021–2022 global energy crisis
- 2022 food crises
