= Carlos Pascual (diplomat) =

American diplomat

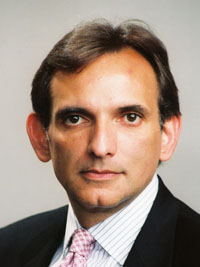

United States Ambassador to Mexico
- In office August 9, 2009 – March 19, 2011
- President: Barack Obama
- Preceded by: Tony Garza
- Succeeded by: Earl Wayne

United States Ambassador to Ukraine
- In office October 22, 2000 – May 1, 2003
- President: Bill Clinton; George W. Bush
- Preceded by: Steven Pifer
- Succeeded by: John E. Herbst

Personal details
- Born: 1959 (age 66–67) Havana, Cuba
- Party: Democratic
- Education: Stanford University (BA); Harvard University (MPP)

Carlos Pascual (born 1959) is a Cuban-American diplomat and the former U.S. Ambassador to Mexico and Ukraine under President Barack Obama and Bill Clinton respectively. He served at the U.S. Agency for international Development from 1983 to 1995, and at the White House National Security Council from 1995 to 2000, ultimately as senior director for Russia, Ukraine and Eurasia. He was the State Department Coordinator for U.S. Assistance to Europe and Eurasia, and subsequently the Coordinator for Reconstruction and Stabilization from 2003 to 2005. Later he served at the Brookings institution and was appointed Special Envoy and Coordinator for International Energy Affairs at the State Department's Bureau of Energy from 2011 to 2014.

He currently serves as senior vice president at S&P Global Commodity Insights.

== Education ==
Pascual attended Bishop Amat Memorial High School in La Puente, California, and graduated in 1976. He then earned a B.A. in international relations from Stanford University in 1980 and an M.P.P. from the Kennedy School of Government at Harvard University in 1982. He was a student of Coit D. Blacker.

== Career ==
Pascual worked for USAID from 1983 to 1995 in Sudan, South Africa and Mozambique, and as Deputy Assistant Administrator for Europe and Eurasia. From July 1998 to January 2000, Pascual served as Special Assistant to the President and NSC Senior Director for Russia, Ukraine and Eurasia, and from 1995 to 1998 as Director for the same region, from October 2000 until May 2003, as the U.S. Ambassador to Ukraine. When the Melnychenko recordings of Leonid Kuchma became known, Pascual revealed that the tapes are genuine, undistorted, unaltered, and not manipulated because of the conclusion from FBI Electronic Research Facility's analysis of the original recording device and the original recording found that there are not unusual sounds which would indicate a tampering of the recording, the recording is continuous with no breaks, and there is no manipulation of the digital files. These recordings, known as Kuchmagate, confirmed Kuchma's involvement in the assassination by decapitation of Georgiy Gongadze and Kuchma's unwavering support for Vladimir Putin during the Cali cocaine cartel money laundering through the Putin-owned German firm St. Petersburg Real Estate Holding Company (German: St. Peterburg Immobilien und Beteiligungs AG) (SPAG). (Note: Markus Rese was CEO of Frankfurt based SPAG which was linked to Vladimir Putin, Herman Gref and Russian criminal groups who had transferred money to SPAG through a Romanian bank. Russian co-owner of the SPAG's joint venture was the government of Saint-Petersburg with 882,500 shares or 27.58% stake and Vladimir Putin, then the municipal official, who was a member of the board from 1992 to 2000 with 200 shares held as a controlling or blocking stake through Vladimir Smirnov since 17 December 1994. The second largest stake in SPAG was 742,176 shares or a 23.19% stake which was held by the Unterschleißheim based Baader Wertpapierhandelsbank. Baader Wertpapierhandelsbank sold a stake in KST investments to Kurt Ochner (born 1953) who was one of the largest fund managers in the Frankfurt Neuer Markt, which gained substantial investments through an alleged speculation bubble from its establishment on 10 March 1997 until its peak on 10 March 2001 during the dot-com bubble and then collapsed until it closed on 5 June 2003, through the 1990 established Luxembourg based Julius Baer investment fund, which is associated with Bank Julius Bär a Zurich based private bank known for its wealth management. During the late 1990s, Marian von Korff (born 17 May 1966 Pfaffenhofen, Upper Bavaria), who is close to Ochner, was an advisor to the Luxembourg based fund VMR Strategie Quadrat and the owner of the 1994 established Fair Invest GmbH and other firms which had IPOs with the Neuer Markt and gave Korff very large returns on his investments including some with the brothers Florian and Thomas Haffa such as EM-Entertainment Munich, Merchandising, Film und Fernsehen GmbH (EM.TV) of the Kirch Group.) (Note: In 2006, Jean Goutchkov, also spelled Ivan Guchkov (Russian: Иван Гучков; born 1954 Paris, France), was managing director at Ferrier Lullin which was acquired by Julius Bär Group AG in September 2005.) His support for the recordings' authenticity directly led to the Orange Revolution of 2004 in Ukraine.

He was then named Assistance Coordinator for Europe and Eurasia. In 2004, he was named Coordinator for Reconstruction and Stabilization at the US Department of State.

In 2015, Pascual worked as vice president and Director of the Foreign Policy Studies Program at the Brookings Institution where he presided over the creation of the Brookings Doha Center and the Brookings-Tsinghua Center.

Selected by President Barack Obama as ambassador to Mexico, he was confirmed by the United States Senate on August 7, 2009. He presented his credentials to the Mexican government on August 9, 2009 and personally to President Felipe Calderón on October 21, 2009. Pascual submitted his resignation as Ambassador to Mexico on March 19, 2011 in part due to tensions with Calderón. Tensions with President Calderón arose as a result of the WikiLeaks release of diplomatic cables in which Pascual criticized the Mexican military's ability or willingness to fight the Mexican drug cartels. Pascual is considered to be the first casualty of the Wikileaks affair.

Pascual was appointed the State Department's Special Envoy and Coordinator for International Energy Affairs in May 2011, succeeding David L. Goldwyn. He led the Bureau of Energy Resources. Pascual was also the senior advisor to the Secretary of State on global energy diplomacy. In February 2012, April 2013 and January 2014 Pascual was nominated as Assistant Secretary of State for Energy Resources, but not confirmed by the Senate. In August 2014 Pascual was succeeded by Amos Hochstein. After leaving the State Department Pascual became senior vice president of global energy at IHS Markit and then senior vice president for geopolitics and international relations at S&P Global Commodities Insights.

Pascual serves on the Board of Directors of Centrica, a British multinational electricity and gas utility company. He is a non-resident fellow at the Center on Global Energy Policy at Columbia University and sits on the Atlantic Council Board of Directors.

== Publications ==
Pascuals publications include articles in The New York Times, the Financial Times, The Wall Street Journal, and HuffPost. His book, Power and Responsibility, won a 2009 award for the best political science book published by an independent publisher.

== Notes ==
Diplomatic posts
Preceded by Tony Garza	U.S. Ambassador to Mexico; 2009–2011	Succeeded by Earl Wayne
Preceded by Steven Pifer	U.S. Ambassador to Ukraine; 2000–2003	Succeeded by John E. Herbst
