= Mary MacKenzie (mezzo-soprano) =

American opera singer (1930–2024)

- Born: June 4, 1930
- Died: February 6, 2024 (aged 93)
- Spouse: Kedar Pyatt (m. 1956)
- Children: Geoffrey

Mary MacKenzie (June 4, 1930 – February 6, 2024) was an American classical mezzo-soprano and voice teacher.

== Career ==
She earned both bachelor and master of music degrees from the Juilliard School. In 1955, she won the Walter W. Naumburg Foundation competition, and in 1960, she won the Metropolitan Opera National Council Auditions. She was also twice awarded the Martha Baird Rockefeller Fund grant and was a recipient of the Sullivan Award. Her performance credits include appearances with The Bach Choir of Bethlehem, the Dallas Opera, the Lyric Opera of Chicago, the Metropolitan Opera, the NBC Opera Theatre, the New Orleans Opera, the San Diego Opera, and the Santa Fe Opera among others. She was formerly the head of the vocal pedagogy department at San Diego State University where she taught for more than 20 years. She taught private voice lessons at Point Loma Nazarene University and was the administrative vice-President of the Board of the National Association of Teachers of Singing (NATS). She previously served as the Vice-President of NATS for five years.

== Personal life ==
MacKenzie was the mother of Geoffrey Pyatt, the former American Assistant Secretary of State for Energy Resources and ambassador to Greece.

She died on February 6, 2024, at the age of 93.

== Selected recordings ==
- Medea (Luigi Cherubini): Nicola Rescigno conducting the Dallas Opera (Dallas Civic Opera) with Maria Callas, Teresa Berganza, and Jon Vickers. Label: Gala. 1958.
- Mefistofele (Arrigo Boito): Nino Sanzogno conducting, Nicolai Ghiaurov, Alfredo Kraus, Renata Tebaldi. San Francisco "Live Opera Productions" Label. 1965.
