= Geoffrey R. Pyatt =

American diplomat (born 1963)

Geoffrey Pyatt

2nd Assistant Secretary of State for Energy Resources
- In office September 19, 2022 – January 20, 2025
- President: Joe Biden
- Preceded by: Francis R. Fannon

United States Ambassador to Greece
- In office October 24, 2016 – May 10, 2022
- President: Barack Obama; Donald Trump; Joe Biden
- Preceded by: David Pearce
- Succeeded by: George J. Tsunis

United States Ambassador to Ukraine
- In office July 30, 2013 – August 18, 2016
- President: Barack Obama
- Preceded by: John Tefft
- Succeeded by: Marie Yovanovitch

Personal details
- Born: Geoffrey Ross Pyatt; November 16, 1963 (age 62) San Diego, California, U.S.
- Spouse: Mary D. Pyatt
- Children: 2
- Parents: Bud Pyatt; Mary MacKenzie
- Education: University of California, Irvine (BA); Yale University (MA)

Geoffrey Ross Pyatt (born November 16, 1963) is a United States diplomat who served as Assistant Secretary of State for Energy Resources from 2022 to 2025. He was previously United States Ambassador to Greece and Ukraine. Pyatt's career in the U.S. State Department has led to posts in Asia, Europe, and Central America.

== Early life and education ==
Pyatt was born in La Jolla, a suburb of San Diego, California, the son of Bud Pyatt and Mary MacKenzie. His father was a mathematician and his mother was a mezzo-soprano singer. He received a bachelor's degree in political studies in 1985 at the University of California, Irvine, and a master's degree in international relations at Yale University in 1987.

== Career ==
Pyatt started his diplomatic career in Honduras from 1990 until 1992 as vice-consul and economic officer in Tegucigalpa. He was deputy chief of diplomatic mission in India in 2006 and 2007. After that, he worked as deputy chief of U.S. mission to International Atomic Energy Agency and other international organizations in Vienna. Pyatt served as Principal Deputy Assistant Secretary of the Bureau of South and Central Asian Affairs from May 2010 until July 2013.

Pyatt took the Oath of Office of United States Ambassador to Ukraine on July 30, 2013 in the Harry S Truman Building of the United States Department of State in Washington, D.C. Ukrainian President Viktor Yanukovych accepted Pyatt's credentials on August 15, 2013. After his appointment, Pyatt started actively studying the Ukrainian language. On October 15, 2013, Pyatt attended an international conference on fighting anti-Semitism in Kyiv, but could not address the audience at the event due to the United States federal government shutdown of 2013.

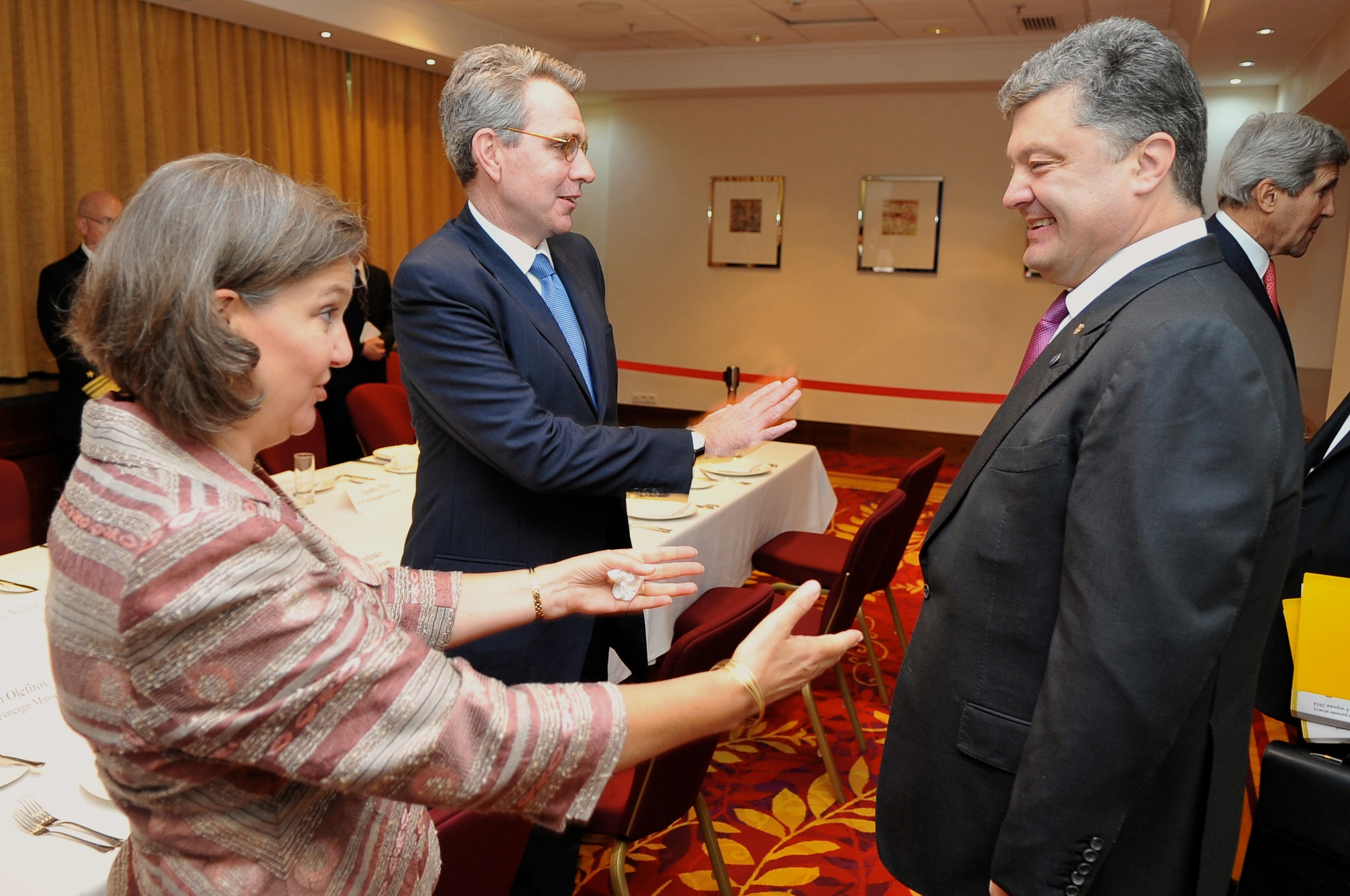
Assistant Secretary Victoria Nuland and Geoffrey Pyatt greet Ukrainian President-elect Petro Poroshenko before he met with U.S. Secretary of State John Kerry in Warsaw, Poland, on June 4, 2014

During the 2014 Ukrainian revolution against Ukraine's President Victor Yanukovych, Pyatt became part of a diplomatic scandal in February 2014, when his conversation from the previous month with the Assistant Secretary of State for European and Eurasian Affairs at the United States Department of State, Victoria Nuland, was apparently intercepted and uploaded to YouTube. The conversation included Nuland saying, "Fuck the EU", which were harshly criticized by the President of the European Council Herman van Rompuy and by German Chancellor Angela Merkel. The call followed an offer made on January 25, 2014 by Ukrainian president Yanukovych to include two members of the opposition in his government to calm the Maidan protests in Ukraine, one being that of his Prime Minister. Nuland and Pyatt voiced their opinions of this offer, specifically on the post of Prime Minister, giving their opinion on the suitability and role of several opposition personalities. Of Vitali Klitschko, Pyatt said, "Let him stay out and do his political homework and stuff I'm just thinking in terms of sort of the process moving ahead we want to keep the moderate democrats together". He also proposed "some kind of outreach to Yanukovych" and Nuland mentioned that then-Vice President Joe Biden would be helpful in that regard. He further said, "We want to try to get somebody with an international personality to come out here and help to midwife this thing" (a reference to Nuland's earlier suggestion of Robert Serry of the UN). This led to speculation in Russia and in the United States that the U.S. Government was interfering with Ukraine's sovereignty.

After President Yanukovych's dismissal by the Ukrainian Parliament, Pyatt characterised pro-Russian separatist rebels in Donetsk and Luhansk as "terrorists".

On September 25, 2015, during his speech at Odesa Financial Forum, Pyatt criticized Ukrainian Prosecutor's office.

On May 19, 2016, he was nominated by U.S. President Barack Obama to serve as United States Ambassador to Greece. He was replaced by Marie L. Yovanovitch in Ukraine. He was confirmed as the Ambassador to Greece on July 14, 2016. He was sworn in September 2016. He presented his credentials on October 24, 2016. He served in the post from October 24, 2016, until May 10, 2022.

On April 22, 2022, President Joe Biden nominated Pyatt to the position of Assistant Secretary of State for Energy Resources. The Senate confirmed his nomination on September 15, 2022, and he was sworn in on September 19.

== Personal life ==
Pyatt speaks Spanish.

== See also ==
- List of ambassadors of the United States to Ukraine
- List of ambassadors of the United States to Greece
- List of Assistant Secretaries of State for Energy Resources

Diplomatic posts
Preceded by John Tefft	United States Ambassador to Ukraine; 2013–2016	Succeeded by Marie Yovanovitch
Preceded by David Pearce	United States Ambassador to Greece; 2016–2022	Succeeded by George J. Tsunis
