= Bud Pyatt =

American mathematician (born 1933)

- Born: May 20, 1933 (age 92); Wadesboro, North Carolina, U.S.
- Occupation: Mathematician
- Spouse: Mary MacKenzie (m. 1956; died 2024)
- Children: Geoffrey

Kedar Davis "Bud" Pyatt Jr. (born May 20, 1933) was Project Orion's chief mathematician. He worked on nuclear physics calculations for the project.

Having a PhD in nuclear physics from Yale University, he created mathematical models of the processes that were occurring, then setting up equations to simulate those processes and calculate the behavior.

Pyatt was born in Wadesboro, North Carolina. He is the father of Geoffrey Pyatt, the former American Assistant Secretary of State for Energy Resources and ambassador to Greece.
