= 2022 Europe inflation protests =

Protests across Europe

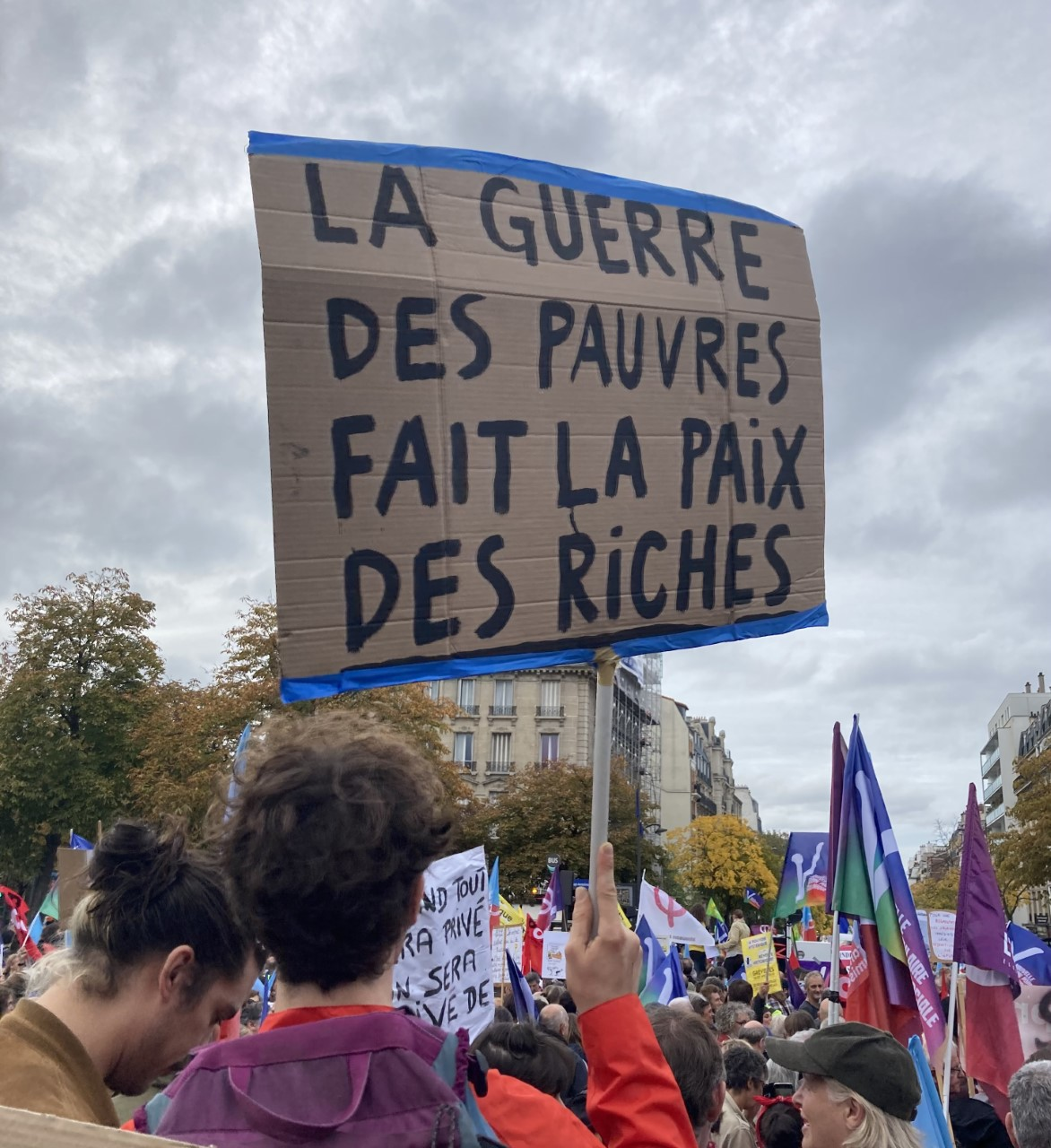
Protest in Paris on 16 October 2022; the sign reads "The war of the poor makes the peace of the rich".

2022 Europe inflation protests were protests across Europe against the growing cost of living and inflation. The rise of prices has been attributed to the 2022 Russian invasion of Ukraine. The protests have been reported in France, Germany, Romania, and Czech Republic.

Energy prices pushed eurozone inflation to a record 9.9%, making it more difficult for individuals to buy their needs. According to risk consultancy company Verisk Maplecroft, the war in Ukraine "sharply raised the risk of civil unrest in Europe."

The inflation rate peaked at 10.6% in October 2022, before gradually declining to 7% by April 2023. Since then, combating inflation became a priority in economic policy, prompting European governments to mobilize unprecedented instruments to confront it.

== Britain ==
On 20 October 2022, British railway workers union RMT stated the union would strike in early November against 14 train operating companies since, they said, the British railway industry has failed to offer "new offers on pay, jobs and working conditions." About 2,000 staff working at the Atomic Weapons Establishment, which manufactures and maintains nuclear warheads, are yet to decide whether to take strike action or not. Almost 1,000 GXO drivers in Britain will strike during the first five days November in a dispute over low wages, warning that beer deliveries could be disrupted. More than 300,000 members of largest nursing union in Britain have started voting over taking a strike action to raise the payments. Also, hundreds of workers in Liverpool port are set to go on strike for two weeks starting October 24 over salary and job.

== France ==
Thousands of people across France came to the streets in October 2022 launching a statewide strike against the rise in cost of living. The demonstrations were erupted following weeks of "walkouts" that have crippled oil refineries and caused gasoline shortages. The demonstrations are described as "stiffest challenge" for Emmanuel Macron since his re-election in May 2022. There have been weeks of strikes at oil refineries for higher salaries which led to calls for a nationwide and general strike.

== Germany ==
Tens of thousands of protesters in six German cities Berlin, Düsseldorf, Hannover, Stuttgart, Dresden and Frankfurt-am-Main gathered on 23 October 2022 "to demand a more just distribution of government funds" so that people can handle the "rising energy prices and living costs and a faster transition away from fossil fuels." Protesters were holding signs bearing slogans on variety of issues such as "lowering inflation to switching off nuclear power and more energy price subsidies for the poor."

== Other countries ==
On September 28, tens of thousands of Czechs marched in Prague against the government's management of growing energy prices and the country's membership in NATO and the European Union. According to reports, the event was organized by "far-right and fringe groups and parties, including Communists."

On October 14, thousands of Hungarian students and parents participated in the second large march in two weeks in support of teachers who have been sacked for participating in a strike for higher salaries, and teachers who have been threatened with dismissal. On 23 October thousands of Hungarian people including teachers and students marched across Budapest to protest against the government, demanding higher salaries for teachers and condemned the soaring inflation. The protesters held up banners reading "Orbán get lost" and "No teachers, no future." Teacher for Teachers Facebook page wrote that around 700 teachers from 71 schools left their schools as a sign of protest on 3 December 2022, which led to suspension of classes in numerous institutions.

== See also ==
- 2022–2023 global food crises
- 2020s energy crisis
- Regional effects of the 2021–2023 global energy crisis
- List of protests in the 21st century
