= George James Tsunis =

American lawyer and diplomat (born 1967)

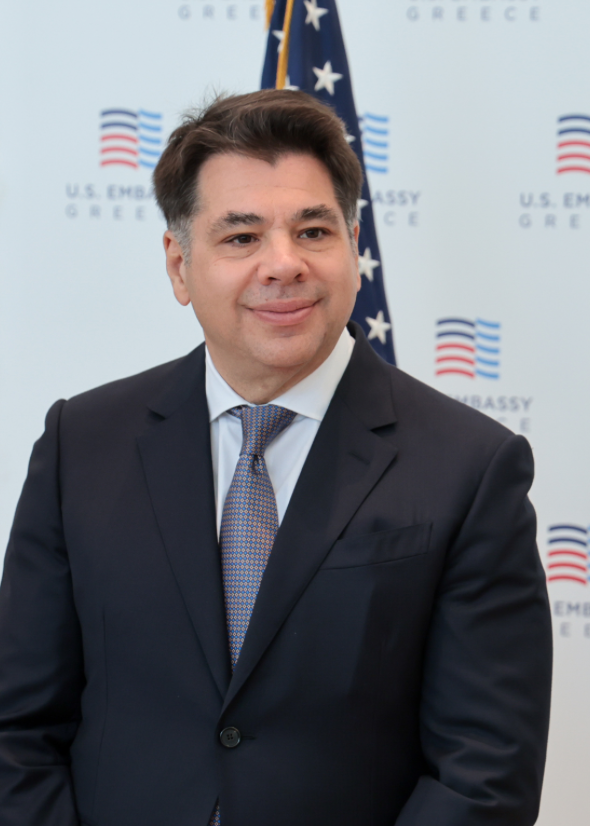
- Tsunis in 2024

United States Ambassador to Greece
- In office May 10, 2022 – January 20, 2025
- President: Joe Biden
- Preceded by: Geoffrey R. Pyatt
- Succeeded by: Kimberly Guilfoyle

Personal details
- Born: December 26, 1967 (age 58) Queens, New York, U.S.
- Party: Democratic
- Spouse: Olga Tsunis
- Children: 3
- Education: New York University (BA); St. John's University (JD)
- Occupation: CEO
- Website: U.S. Embassy to Greece

George James Tsunis (Greek: Γεώργιος Δημητρίου Τσούνης; born December 26, 1967) is an American lawyer and businessman who served as United States ambassador to Greece from 2022 to 2025. He was nominated by President Joe Biden to serve in the role on October 8, 2021, confirmed by the United States Senate on March 10, 2022, and began serving on May 10, 2022.

He was previously a nominee to be the U.S. ambassador to Norway by President Barack Obama, although his nomination ultimately failed.

== Early and personal life ==
Tsunis was born in 1967 in Queens, New York, the son of James and Eleni Tsunis, immigrants from Greece. He graduated from Commack High School in Commack, New York in 1985.

He received a Bachelor of Arts in classical studies from New York University in 1989, and a Juris Doctor from St. John's University School of Law in 1992.

Tsunis was raised in the Greek Orthodox church. In 2021, he was appointed co-vice chairman of the Greek Orthodox America Archdiocese's National Coordinating Committee. He has been awarded the Saint Paul's Medal, the Greek Orthodox Church of America's highest recognition for a layperson.

Tsunis speaks English and Greek.

== Career ==
As a practicing attorney, Tsunis was a partner at the law firm Rivkin Radler LLP. He married Greek-American Olga J. Antzoulis in November 2004 and had his first child, James in 2007. They live in Lloyd Harbor, Long Island, with their three children. He has two sisters.

=== Nomination as U.S. ambassador to Norway ===
Tsunis was nominated as U.S. ambassador to Norway on September 10, 2013. His nomination was part of a backlog of nominees for ambassador positions across the world. Norway had never been without a US ambassador for as long.

Tsunis' nomination hearing generated controversy, both in Norway and in the United States, due to his confession of never having been to Norway, and his apparent ignorance of Norwegian political issues. According to some sources, the U.S. Embassy apologized for some statements to the Norwegian government and other involved parties in Norway.

In statements to the press in December 2014, Tsunis indicated that he was no longer seeking the nomination as ambassador to Norway.

=== U.S. ambassador to Greece ===
Tsunis was nominated to be the next U.S. ambassador to Greece on October 8, 2021, by President Biden. Hearings on his nomination were held before the Senate Foreign Relations Committee on January 12, 2022. On March 8, 2022, the committee reported his nomination favorably to the Senate floor. Tsunis was officially confirmed by the entire Senate on March 10, 2022, via voice vote.

President Katerina Sakellaropoulou accepted his credentials on May 10, 2022, at the Presidential Mansion, Athens.

== See also ==
- List of ambassadors of the United States to Greece

Diplomatic posts
Preceded by Geoffrey R. Pyatt	United States Ambassador to Greece; 2022–2025	Succeeded by Kimberly Guilfoyle
