= Assistant Secretary of State for Energy Resources =

U.S. government position

United States Assistant Secretary of State for Energy Resources
- Seal of the United States Department of State

- Flag of an Assistant Secretary of State
- Reports to: Under Secretary for Economic Growth, Energy, and the Environment
- Nominator: President of the United States
- Inaugural holder: Francis R. Fannon
- Website: www.state.gov/e/enr

The assistant secretary of state for energy resources is the head of the Bureau of Energy Resources within the United States Department of State, supporting the department's efforts in promoting international energy security. The assistant secretary reports to the under secretary of state for economic growth, energy, and the environment.

President Barack Obama nominated Carlos Pascual and Amos Hochstein to the position in 2012 and 2015 respectively, but the Senate did not act on either nomination. On January 12, 2018, Donald Trump nominated Francis R. Fannon to the position. Fannon testified to the Senate Foreign Relations Committee on February 15, 2018 and was confirmed on May 24, 2018, as the bureau's first assistant secretary.

On August 10, 2021, United States Secretary of State Antony Blinken announced that he is appointing Hochstein as the Senior Advisor for Energy Security.

== Responsibilities ==
The Assistant Secretary of ENR is the Secretary of State's adviser on energy security. The assistant secretary's responsibilities include:

- Formulating and implementing international policies aimed at protecting and advancing U.S. energy security interests in the fields of petroleum, natural gas, biofuels, renewable energy, nuclear, and other energy resources;
- Policy analysis that covers foreign economic policy in hydrocarbon resources, alternative and renewable energy resources, energy efficiency, energy transparency, and resource governance.

== List of Assistant Secretaries of State for Energy Resources ==
No.	Name	Assumed office	Left office	President(s) served under
1	Francis R. Fannon	May 29, 2018	January 20, 2021	Donald Trump
-	Virginia E. Palmer (acting)	January 20, 2021	September 7, 2021	Joe Biden
-	Harry R. Kamian (acting)	September 7, 2021	September 19, 2022	Joe Biden
2	Geoffrey R. Pyatt	September 19, 2022	January 20, 2025	Joe Biden
-	Laura Lochman (acting)	January 20, 2025	July 11, 2025	Donald Trump
-	Vacant	July 11, 2025	Present	Donald Trump
