= Francis R. Fannon =

American government official and oil executive

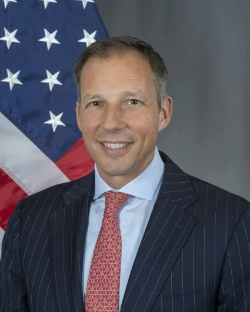

1st Assistant Secretary of State for Energy Resources
- In office May 29, 2018 – January 20, 2021
- President: Donald Trump
- Preceded by: Position created
- Succeeded by: Geoffrey R. Pyatt

Personal details
- Born: Orange, California, U.S.
- Education: Radford University (BA); University of Denver (JD, MA)

Francis R. Fannon is the inaugural holder of the United States Assistant Secretary of State for Energy Resources position, serving in that capacity from May 29, 2018, to January 20, 2021.

== Career ==
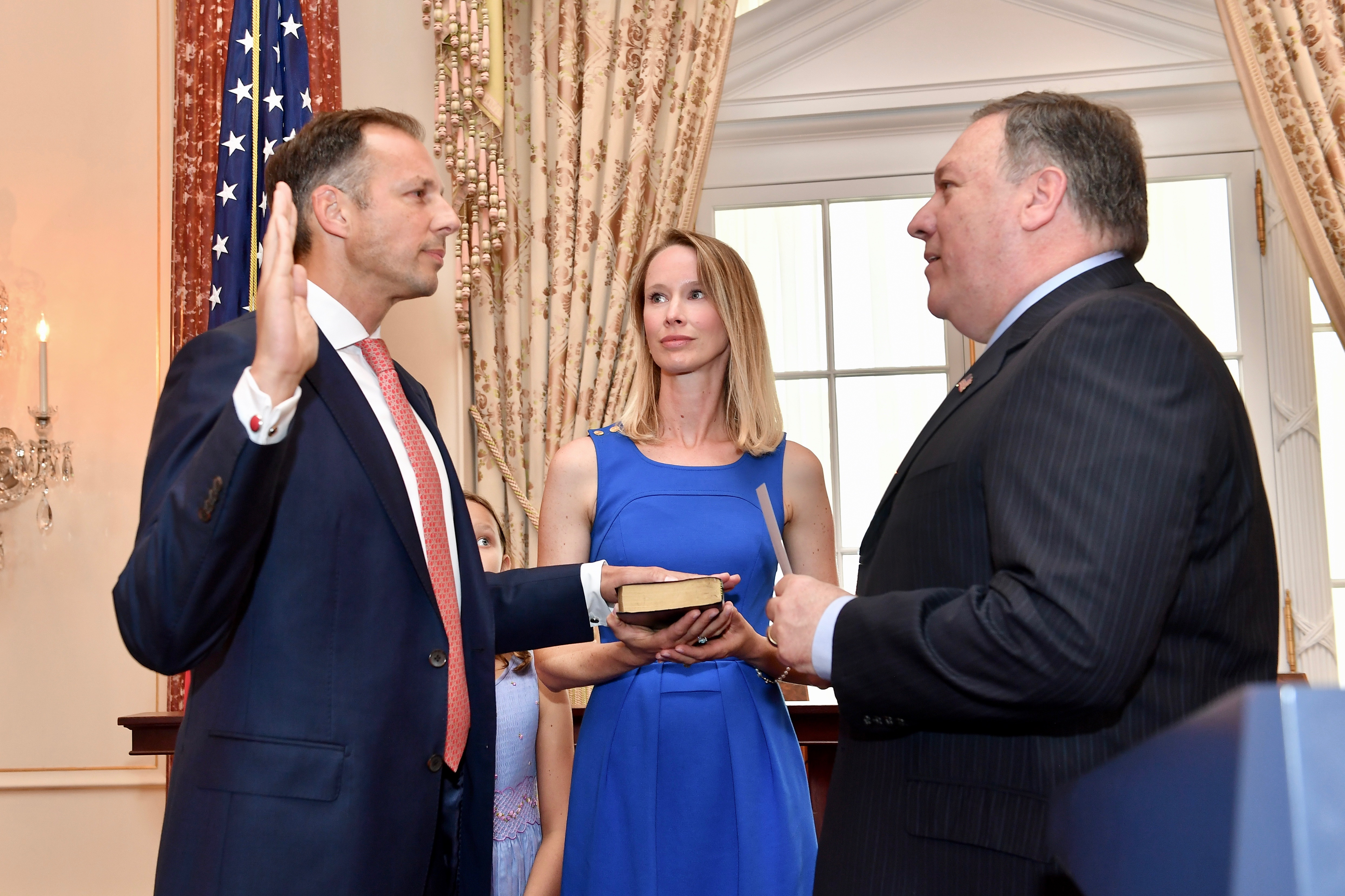
Fannon sworn in as Assistant Secretary for Energy Resources in 2018

Fannon reported to Under Secretary of State Keith Krach, where they together led a clean energy initiative creating a Clean Minerals Network, also called the Energy Resource Governance Initiative (ERGI). Previously, Fannon had worked as a partner in the Coefficient Group consulting firm, managing director of BHP’s Corporate Affairs office, Senior Director at Murphy Oil, and various roles in US Senate offices, including key work on the Energy Policy Act of 2005.

Fannon was appointed on January 18, 2018. He was confirmed by voice vote of the Senate on May 24, 2018. He assumed office May 29, 2018. He left office on January 20, 2021, with the end of the first Trump Administration.
