= Regional effects of the 2021–2023 global energy crisis =

2021–2022 global energy crisis

The Global energy crisis (2021–2023) has caused varying effects in different parts of the world.

== Effects by location ==
=== Africa ===
==== Cameroon ====
Cameroon has been hit by fuel shortages in July as most fuel stations run out of diesel and have to start rationing. Fuel subsidies cost the Cameroonian government over $1.2 billion a year and Yaounde has come under pressure from the IMF to stop them.

==== Central African Republic ====
Fuel shortage and rising food prices exacerbated humanitarian assistance in the country, with some humanitarian flights having been either suspended or postponed due to high fuel price.

==== Ethiopia ====
In Ethiopia, the government removed fuel subsidies in July, causing diesel price to increase by 38%. Motorists in the capital Addis Ababa were seen waiting in long queues for up to eight hours to refill. Ethiopia's government was urged to lift restrictions on fuel supplies to the war-torn Tigray Region.

==== Kenya ====
In Kenya, a row between oil companies and the government over subsidy payments has resulted in reduced imports and a fuel crunch. Hours-long queues and strict rationing at petrol stations are reported.

==== Nigeria ====
Fuel crisis exacerbated by the Russian invasion of Ukraine has caused prices for importing fuel to go up by more than 100%. Despite being an oil exporting country and Africa's biggest oil producer, Nigeria imports almost all of its fuel since its refineries fail to cover the country's needs. Long lines up to eight hours are reported in the capital Lagos. The lack of A1 jet fuel has caused flights to be cancelled with passengers stranded in Abuja.

==== Sierra Leone ====
In Sierra Leone, protests triggered by rising cost of living and energy broke out in August. At least 21 civilians and 6 police officers were reported killed.

=== Asia ===
==== Bangladesh ====
In Bangladesh, street protests have erupted across Bangladesh in August over fuel price hikes, with price of petrol had increased by nearly 52 percent.

==== China ====
China is facing its worst energy crisis in decades, due in part to a record heatwave, with droughts drying up water reservoirs and impacting hydropower stations. The Guardian reported that "Companies in the industrial heartlands have been told to limit consumption, residents have been subjected to rolling blackouts, and annual light shows have been cancelled."

Prices for industrial metals such as copper, zinc and aluminum have soared to record levels as energy shortages in China drive up costs for electricity and natural gas. The price of aluminum has reached a 13-year high.

The energy crisis has intensified pressures on China ahead of the 2022 Winter Olympics. Al-Jazeera reported that "China's energy crisis is partially of its own making as CCP general secretary Xi Jinping tries to ensure blue skies at the Winter Olympics in Beijing next February and show the international community he's serious about de-carbonizing the economy."

The energy crunch in Europe and Asia has allowed the Kremlin to forge its energy connections with China as Gazprom announced another gas pipeline with China, Power of Siberia 2, after the finalization of the existing Power of Siberia in 2019. The second project between Moscow and Beijing, planned to deliver gas from the Yamal Peninsula, is projected to be signed off in late 2022. According to ship-tracking data, China spent almost US$19 billion on Russian oil, gas and coal in the first half of 2022, nearly twice the amount than a year earlier. In July 2022, Laura Myllyvirta of Centre for Research on Energy and Clean Air told Al Jazeera "China is already buying essentially everything that Russia can export via pipelines and Pacific ports."

==== India ====
India experienced power outages in Uttar Pradesh, Rajasthan, Punjab, Jharkhand, Maharashtra, and Kerala as the country's coal stockpiles at power plants were dangerously low. In order to mitigate the outage, coal supplies were re-routed from industries to power plants.

In October 2021, the crisis reached its peak, with 1/3 of coal power plants having less than three days of supply. A complete power failure was averted as Coal India, which supplies 80% of coal output, ramped up coal production.

In 2022, India was in a similar situation as China. The country increased its energy reliance with Russia in the aftermath of the Russian invasion of Ukraine, as imports for Russian liquid gas, crude oil and coal tripled to almost $5 billion.

==== Laos ====
In 2022, Laos was hit by an economic crisis caused by rising debt, fuel shortage and rising inflation. Long queues formed at gas stations in Vientiane as motorists scrambled for fuel.

==== South Korea ====
Diesel vehicle drivers had difficulties buying diesel exhaust fluid in South Korea. Despite sanctions against the Russian Federation, SK signed a 3 trillion ($2.25 billion) deal with a Russian state-run nuclear energy company to provide components for Egypt's first nuclear power plant, although it made an awful impression on its Western allies.

==== Sri Lanka ====
High fuel prices and the Sri Lankan economic crisis resulted in electricity, fuel and cooking gas shortages in the country. Long queues formed in front of gas stations as government suspended fuel sales to non-essential vehicles. Discontent lead to protests which ousted president Gotabaya Rajapaksa.

==== Vietnam ====
Vietnam experienced a nationwide fuel supply crunch in November 2022. Some gas stations in two biggest cities Hanoi and Ho Chi Minh city have shut or limited sales, resulting in long queues of people waiting to get refueled.

=== Oceania ===
==== Australia ====
Australia's east coast faced very high gas and electricity prices and low reserve capacity in mid-2022, due to a combination of factors, including high prices for gas (which is exported via LNG terminals in Queensland and thus local prices depend on the global LNG market) and thermal coal, constrained production and transportation due to flooding in coal producing regions, and a series of outages in coal-fired power plants. This led the Australian energy market operator AEMO to temporarily suspend operation of the east coast electricity market for the first time since its inception, and take direct control of generation and dispatch. AEMO also intervened in the local gas market after a large gas storage facility in Victoria became increasingly depleted due to the "unprecedented demand".

=== Europe ===
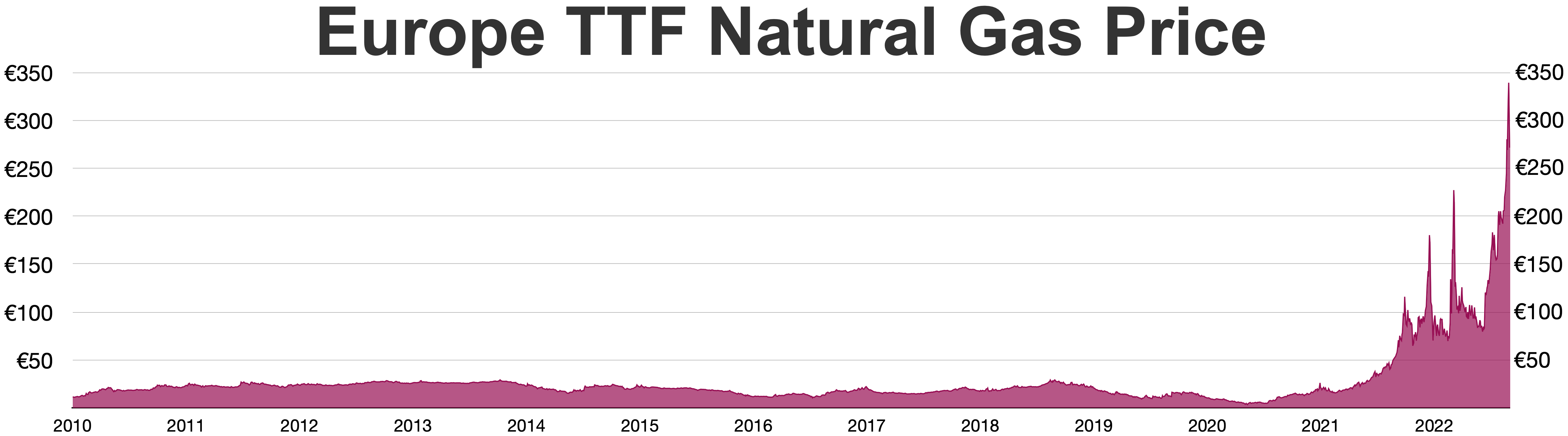
Europe TTF natural gas

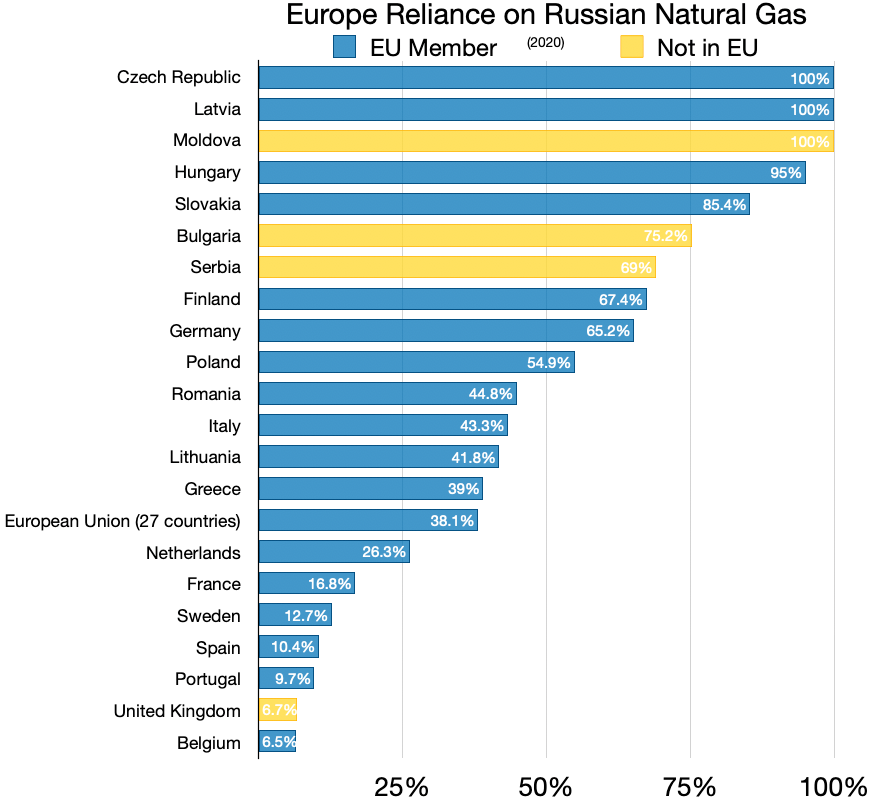
European Countries Dependence On Russian Natural Gas

The EU's fossil import costs spiked during the energy crisis

Due to a combination of unfavourable conditions, which involved soaring demand of natural gas, its diminished supply from U.S., Norway and Russia to the European markets, less power generation by renewable energy sources such as wind, water and solar energy, and a cold winter that left European gas reservoirs depleted, Europe faced steep increases in gas prices in 2021. Russia has fully supplied on all long-term contracts, but has not supplied extra gas on the spot market; in the first half of 2021, Russia supplied over 3 billion m³/week (almost half of EU's imports), and around 2.3 billion m³/week in the second half of 2021. In October 2021, the Economist Intelligence Unit reported that Russia had limited extra gas export capacity because of its own high domestic demands with production near its peak. On 27 October 2021, Russian President Vladimir Putin authorised state-controlled energy giant Gazprom to start pumping extra natural gas into European gas storage sites once Russia finishes filling its own gas inventories, which may happen by November 8.

The Groningen gas field in the Netherlands, Europe's largest natural gas field, will stop production between 2025 and 2028. Reuters reported that "extraction quickly became problematic in recent years, as a series of tremors caused by gas production damaged houses and buildings in the region."

Some critics blamed the European Union Emissions Trading System (EU ETS) and closure of nuclear plants for contributing to the energy crisis. The Merkel government in Germany decided in 2011 to phase out both nuclear power and coal plants.

U.S. exports of liquefied natural gas (LNG) to China and other Asian countries surged in 2021, with Asian buyers willing to pay higher prices than European importers. In late 2021 and early 2022, half or more of US LNG exports went to Europe.

In late 2021, European energy prices continued to increase, while an unprecedented energy crunch, particularly for natural gas, weighed heavily on economic growth indicators. Norway increased its export to EU to 2.9 billion m³/week. Liquified natural gas markets were tight for the entire 2021. The Kremlin has been accused to tout the necessity of Nord Stream 2, but some energy analysts view energy shortages in Europe as self-inflicted, and blame European Union sanctions of Russian entities, among other reasons.

Europe's energy crisis was spreading to the fertilizer and food industries. According to Julia Meehan, the head of fertilizers for the commodity price agency ICIS, "We are seeing record prices for every fertiliser type, which are all way above the previous highs in 2008. It's very, very serious. People don't realise that 50% of the world's food relies on fertilisers."

On 16 November 2021, European natural gas prices rose by 17% after Germany's energy regulator temporarily suspended approval of the Nord Stream 2 natural gas pipeline from Russia to Germany.

In the first two months after Russia invaded Ukraine on 24 February 2022, Russia earned $66.5 billion from fossil fuel exports, and the EU accounted for 71% of that trade. As a result of the invasion, Brent oil prices rose above $130 a barrel for the first time since 2008. In April 2022, Russia supplied 45% of EU's natural gas imports, earning $900 million a day. In May 2022, the European Commission proposed a ban on oil imports from Russia, part of the economic response to the 2022 Russian invasion of Ukraine. In May 2022, Russia imposed sanctions on European subsidiaries of Gazprom.

In response to the invasion of Ukraine, the European Commission and International Energy Agency presented joint plans to reduce reliance on Russian energy, reduce Russian gas imports by two thirds within a year, and completely by 2030. On 18 May 2022, the European Union published plans to end its reliance on Russian oil, natural gas and coal by 2027.

Responding to the crisis, Peru saw its export of LNG increase 74% in the first months of 2022 compared to the previous year, with LNG exports to Europe rising greatly, especially in Spain and the United Kingdom.

In June 2022, the United States government agreed to allow Italian company Eni and Spanish company Repsol to import oil from Venezuela to Europe to replace oil imports from Russia. French Finance Minister Bruno Le Maire said that France negotiated with the United Arab Emirates to replace some Russian oil imports. On 15 June 2022, Israel, Egypt and the European Union signed a trilateral natural gas agreement.

In March 2022, Bloomberg reported that China was reselling its US LNG shipments to a desperate Europe at a "hefty profit". In August 2022, it was reported in Nikkei Asia that China was again reselling some of its surplus LNG cargoes to Europe due to having weak energy demands in its domestic market, suggesting that China was sufficiently stocked in LNG and was an unexpected "white knight" throwing an "energy lifeline" to help Europe with its winter gas shortage fears.

The energy crisis is expected to damage Europe's energy-intensive industries such as steel, aluminium, fertilizers and the energy industry. In late 2022, Europe has been buckling under an acute energy shortage with governments pushing through multi-billion euro packages to protect households from soaring energy bills. In late summer 2022, Russia had halted gas flows via the Nord Stream 1 pipeline several times blaming international sanctions against Russia, while the value of the Euro continued to slip against all major currencies. Russia's foreign ministry blamed the United States for Europe's energy crisis, by pushing European leaders towards a "suicidal" step of cutting economic and energy cooperation with Moscow, which had been a reliable energy supplier to Europe since Soviet times.

On 6 October 2022, the E.U. in its 8th round of sanctions agreed to price cap Russian oil imports (for Europe and third countries) with a price maximum to be set on December 5, 2022. According to supporting U.S. and U.K. economists, this would "increase the bargaining power for private and public companies that purchase Russian oil". Shortly after the E.U. meeting, OPEC+ decided to cut production again by 2% of the global output. A number of European nations, including Hungary and Serbia insisted on significant exemptions from the sanctions.

After an embargo on Russian oil shipments and a price cap on Russian crude went into effect on December 6, 2022, crude prices climbed considerably as some commodity traders bet on reduced supply globally. RBC Capital Markets warned that crude prices could become even more volatile if Russia stopped oil exports to those countries imposing the price cap.

==== Albania ====
Protests against corruption and the cost of living crisis took place in Tirana.

==== Belgium ====
A study by the Commission for the Regulation of Electricity and Gas showed a 30% increase in the price of electricity and 50% in the price of natural gas in Belgium by September 2021.

==== Bulgaria ====
On 1 October 2022, the long-delayed Interconnector Greece-Bulgaria (IGB) pipeline officially came into service. The pipeline delivers Aseri gas to Bulgaria, but also serves the Western Balkan and Moldova. The EU hailed the project as a step to 'freedom from Russian gas'.

==== France ====
As of early September 2022, 32 of France's 56 nuclear reactors, all operated by EDF, were shut down due to maintenance or technical problems.

Nuclear power in France usually provides up to 70% of electricity production. Corrosion in several French nuclear reactors, even the most modern type N4, led to long term shutdowns since October 2021.

Surging energy prices for natural gas and heating oil have caused higher living expenses, particularly for renters and rural land owners. Socio-economic measures were taken to counter-act inflationary pressures that disproportionally affect working families and immigrants. The 2021 energy crisis, complicated by political tensions in Eastern Europe and scarce natural gas supplies, have cost the French state an additional €580 million ($685 million) per year.

On 6 July 2022, Paris announced that it will nationalise the Électricité de France (EDF) power utility as a result of the escalating energy crisis on the European continent.

On 30 August 2022, just after Gazprom showed a record net profit of 2.5 trillion roubles ($41.75 billion), the Russian gas giant announced it would cut all natural gas deliveries to Engie, "due to a disagreement between the parties". According to the French ministry, Gazprom's actions did not compromise the security of France's energy supply.

As of early September 2022, 32 of France's 56 nuclear reactors, all operated by EDF, were shut down due to maintenance or technical problems.

According to the French polling institute BVA, the approval rating for President Emmanuel Macron dropped to 36% in fall 2022 due to the energy crisis and galloping inflation in France.

==== Germany ====
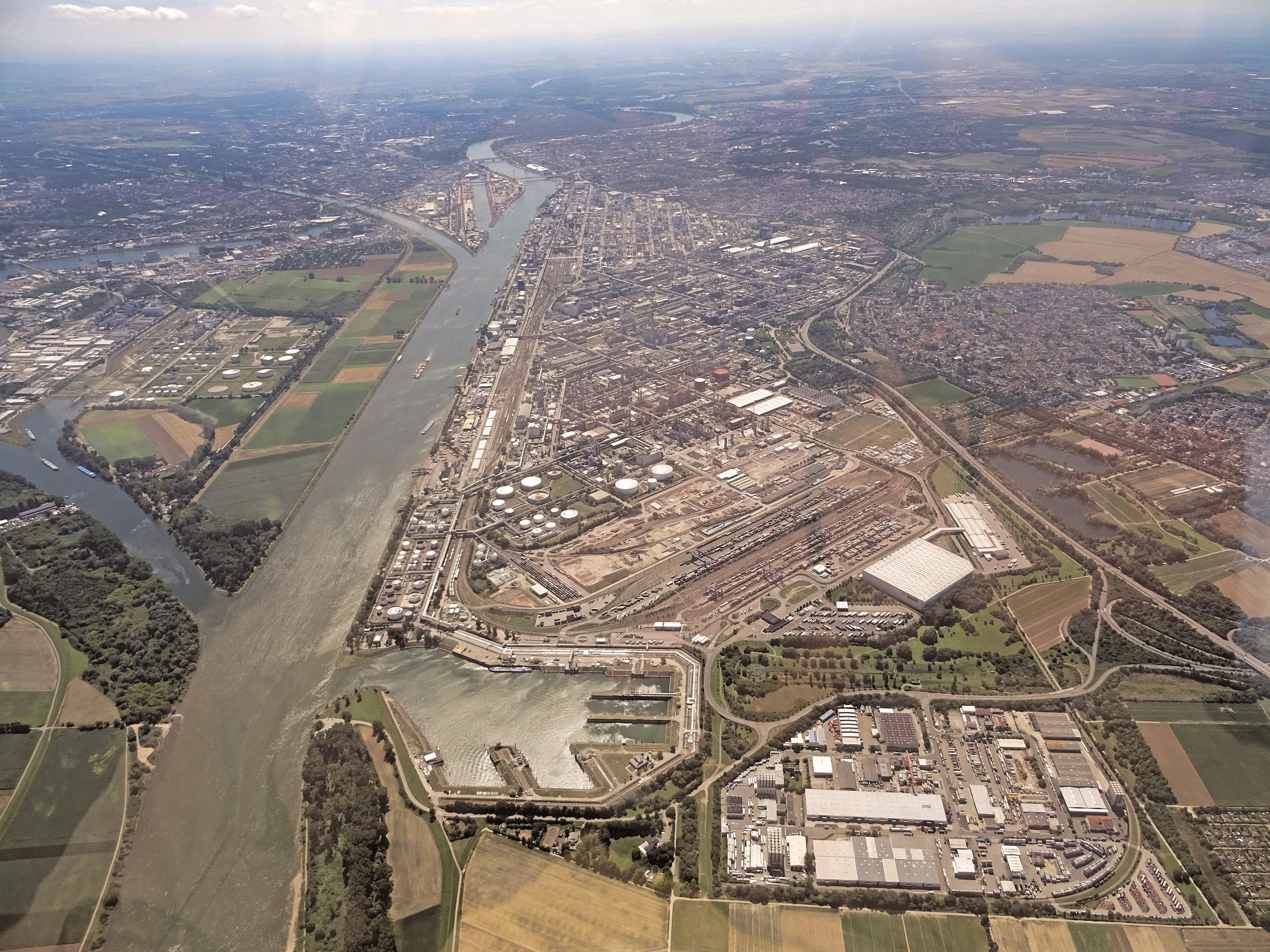
The German chemical company BASF was forced to cut production

Energy-intensive German industry and German exporters were hit particularly hard by the energy crisis. For example, Volkswagen has sufficient gas reserves only for the next five to six months. Carsten Brzeski, economist at ING bank, said the Russian invasion of Ukraine "puts an end to the German economic business model as we knew it — a model which was mainly based on cheap energy imports and industrial exports into an increasingly globalized world." On 29 September 2022, Germany presented a €200 billion plan to support industry and households.

The country is a principal purchaser of Russian natural gas and was mostly affected by sanctions on Russian energy in the aftermath of its invasion of Ukraine in February 2022. Germany indefinitely suspended the regulatory approval for the Nord Stream 2 in March, but resisted pressures to shut down oil and natural gas trades with Russia altogether. In Germany, both employers and labour representatives feared that a further tightening of sanctions would threaten entire employment sectors. The recent energy crisis and encouragement by German governments to save Russian energy was also dubbed "freezing for Ukraine". Industry sectors not directly involved with natural gas or petroleum would also suffer as "firms would go bust" if prices for crucial raw materials like nickel and aluminium were to increase even more. In March 2022, Germany's Minister for Economic Affairs Robert Habeck cautioned, "If we do not obtain more gas next winter and if deliveries from Russia were to be cut then we would not have enough gas to heat all our houses and keep all our industry going." Habeck said Germany plans to end imports of Russian natural gas by mid-2024.

In March 2022, German Chancellor Olaf Scholz announced plans to build two new LNG terminals. Habeck said Germany reached a long-term energy partnership with Qatar, one of the world's largest exporters of liquefied natural gas.

In June 2022, Scholz said that his government remains committed to phasing out nuclear power despite rising energy prices and Germany's dependence on energy imports from Russia. Former Chancellor Angela Merkel committed Germany to a nuclear power phase-out after the Fukushima nuclear disaster.

On 25 July 2022, Gazprom announced it will reduce gas flows to Germany to 20% of the maximum capacity, or 50% of the current throughput, which further exacerbated the energy crisis in Europe.

In September 2022, Germany was forced to take over three Rosneft refineries due to a halt of Russian crude imports. The move averted a shut-down of those refineries, which are essential to the German economy.

On 5 October 2022, German Economy Minister Robert Habeck accused the US and other "friendly" gas supplier nations that they were profiting from the Ukraine war with "astronomical prices". He called for more solidarity by the US to assist energy-pressed allies in Europe.

The energy crisis has increased environmental pressures on forested areas in Germany and elsewhere, as private citizens resorted to chain saws to cut down trees by themselves to obtain firewood for heating.

==== Greece ====
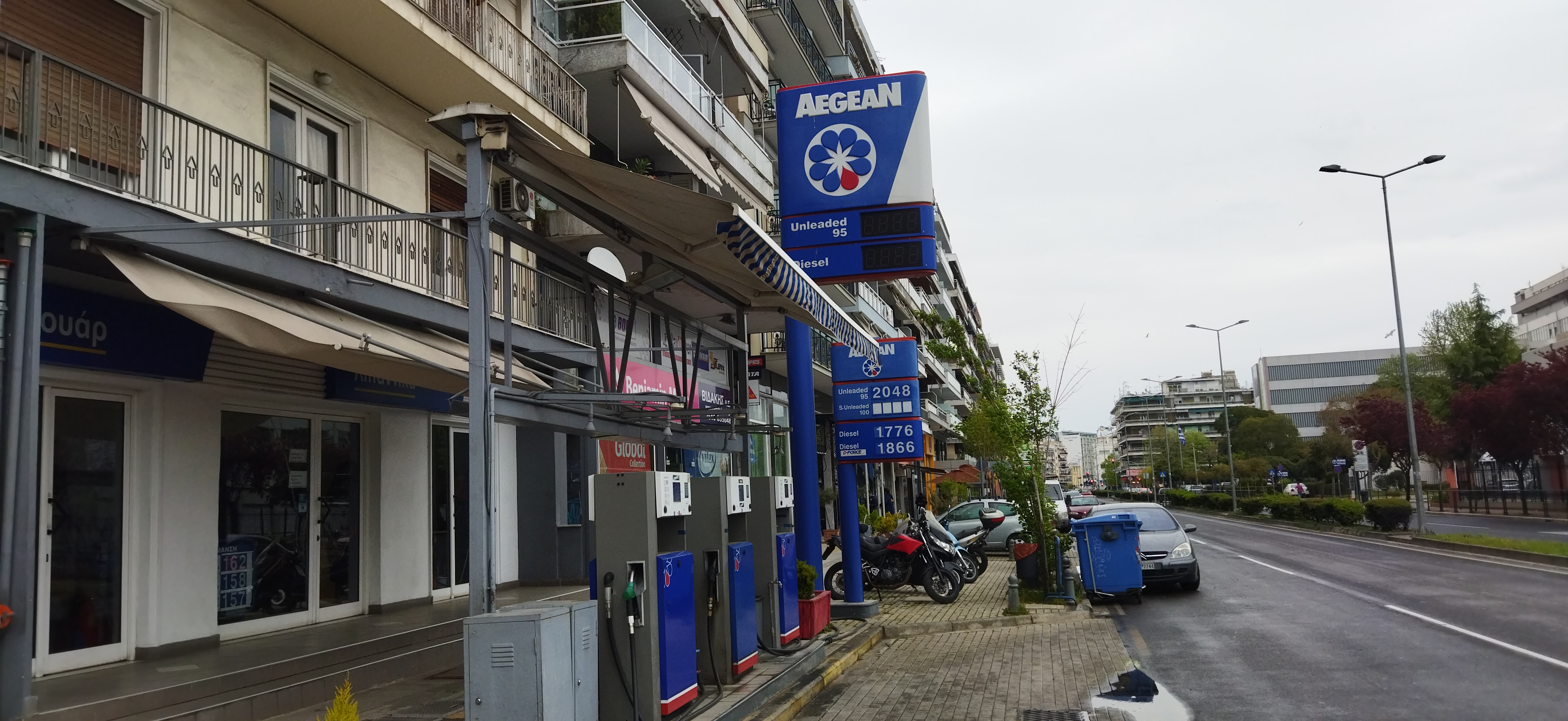
Gas station in Kavala with gas prices exceeding 2 euros/litre

Due to the abrupt delignitisation and Limit Price, electricity prices hit record high €420 per MWh. The Limit Price is a key parameter of the electricity tariff. It is transferred to the electricity bill as adjustment clause. By activating it, the providers pass on to the consumption the total increases of the supply costs in the wholesale market and the reductions respectively, although in the latter case they are not in a hurry or can be forgotten. The adjustment clause transfers to consumption the total cost of supply that is added to the Limit Price and corresponds to costs.

Due to the high taxation, including the Excise Tax, and the rise in price of crude oil, the price of unleaded gasoline went over 2 €/l in April 2022.

==== Serbia ====
The 2021/2022 energy crisis and the Russian invasion of Ukraine made coal from Kosovo more attractive for European energy traders. Serbia as well is increasing coal production due to a lack of hydroelectric energy. Surging wholesale prices for natural gas increased the demand for coal in Western Europe. Environmentalists warned that coal is not the answer, as it roughly emits double the amount of carbon dioxide per kWh.

In October 2022, President Aleksandar Vucic welcomed the agreement by the E.U. to postpone the decision to ban Russian oil imports from the Western Balkans. But he criticised Croatia's decision to include Serbia in an EU ban on Russian oil imports, from which Belgrade was originally exempt. Later, Serbia agreed with Hungary to construct an oil pipeline to supply Serbia with cheaper Russian Urals crude via the Druzhba oil pipeline, to circumvent Croatia.

==== Moldova ====
In 2021, Moldova had a gas crisis that lasted for several months until the signing of a new contract with the Russian state-controlled gas company Gazprom with a duration of 5 years. There were allegations that Russia used this crisis to its advantage as a consequence of Moldova having elected the pro-European now president Maia Sandu over the pro-Russian candidate Igor Dodon in 2020, although this was denied by Russia.

==== Russia ====
In 2022, Russia achieved record amount of earnings through the export of fossil fuels. On 27 May 2022, Russian Finance Minister Anton Siluanov stated that extra revenues from the sale of natural gas in the amount of €13.7 billion will be used to increase pension funds for retired individuals and families with children, as well for "special operations" in Ukraine. Russia has also increased energy exports to China and India to make up for decreased revenues in Europe. In the first half of 2022, Russia pocketed an extra $24 billion from selling fossil fuels to both nations.

By August 2022, Russia was selling almost as much oil as before its invasion of the Ukraine. Sales to the Middle East and Asia helped make up for declining exports to Europe, and due to the higher price, Moscow revenues were $20 billion monthly compared to $14.6 billion a year before (2021). Despite International sanctions during the Russo-Ukrainian War, Russian energy sales have increased in value, and its exports have expanded with new financing options and payment methods for international buyers.

According to Duma speaker Vyacheslav Volodin, the mothballed Nord Stream 2 gas pipeline should be revived to ease energy shortages in Europe. Russia has blamed the West for hindering gas deliveries through the operational Nord Stream 1 pipeline because of economic sanctions and delayed shipments of crucial pipeline components.

Russia had been accused of sabotage by Western nations when four leaks were discovered in the Nord Stream 1/2 pipelines on 26 September 2022, both inoperable at the time. Russia had rejected such allegations. On 29 September, Gazprom announced it will ship 42.5 million cubic metres/d of gas to Europe via Ukraine, a slight increase. The company also said it would deliver 5.7 million cubic metres of gas to Moldavia, but reserved the right to exit the agreement "at any moment".

In October 2022, Russia's exports of crude to China had again surpassed Saudi Arabia's for the 3rd month. Significant increases were seen through the Eastern Siberia–Pacific Ocean oil pipeline and seaborne shipments from Russia’s European and Far Eastern ports, up 7.6% from a year ago, according to Chinese customs data. Increased Russian oil exports to China are significant during an overall decline of 9.5 percent crude oil imports into China.

==== Spain ====
In Spain, electricity prices rose more than 200% by September 2021.

On 1 November 2021, Algeria stopped natural gas exports to Spain through the Maghreb–Europe Gas Pipeline, opting instead to supply Spain through the Medgaz pipeline. Algeria is Spain's largest gas supplier.

==== Switzerland ====
In 2021, the Swiss confederation obtained 45% of its total natural gas consumption from Russian sources via Germany. Initially, Switzerland has sought to expand its use of natural gas for electricity generation, with three back-up power stations to prepare for any potential energy crunch in the coming years. But in the aftermath of the 2022 Russian invasion of the Ukraine, Switzerland imposed financial sanctions against Russian banks, and a ban on Russian crude and petroleum products in June 2022.

In August 2022, the Swiss Federal Council presented an emergency plan for Switzerland's energy grid with the goal to supply more hydroelectric energy, and assure sufficient external storage for natural gas. Switzerland was also negatively affected by the 2022 European drought with minimal fill volumes of alpine dams.

In September 2022, CERN officials presented a plan to reduce energy consumption by the Large Hadron Collider (LHC). The experimental apparatus consumes about a third of Geneva's electricity during peak demand. The European energy crisis has threatened further research at the facility, which is situated on the French-Swiss border.

==== United Kingdom ====
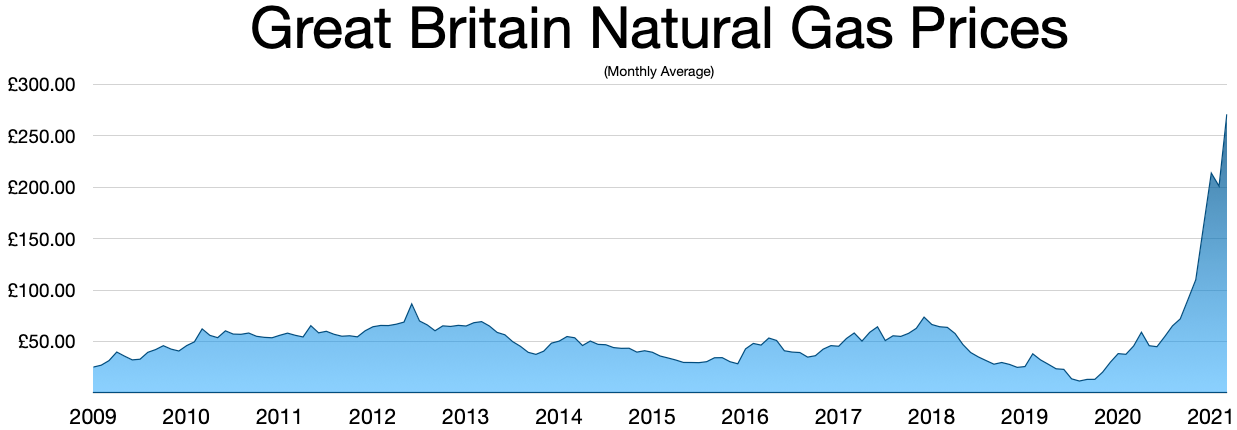
Great Britain Natural Gas Prices

From August 2021, high European wholesale natural gas prices caused 31 domestic suppliers in the United Kingdom to go out of business, out of a total of 70 that had been in operation at the beginning of the year, as customer payments were insufficient to cover energy cost. In September 2021, panic buying of petrol and diesel fuel by consumers in the United Kingdom caused serious disruption to the supply of road fuel.

The National Institute of Economic and Social Research reported that increasing energy bills have been the cause of double-digit inflation on the British Isles due to a disruption of energy sales from Eastern Europe. Economists said that inflation could remain high and likely increase until September 2023.

The energy crisis in the U.K. gave rise to a new societal trend, known as the 'Don't Pay Movement'. With 170,000 signatories the group expects to grow to one million members, and pledges to cancel direct debit payments to energy companies on Oct. 1 when household energy bills are expected to increase by 80%. While the government decried the movement as "irresponsible", it may have influenced Britain's Prime Minister Liz Truss to expedite new energy relief measures.

=== North America ===
==== United States ====
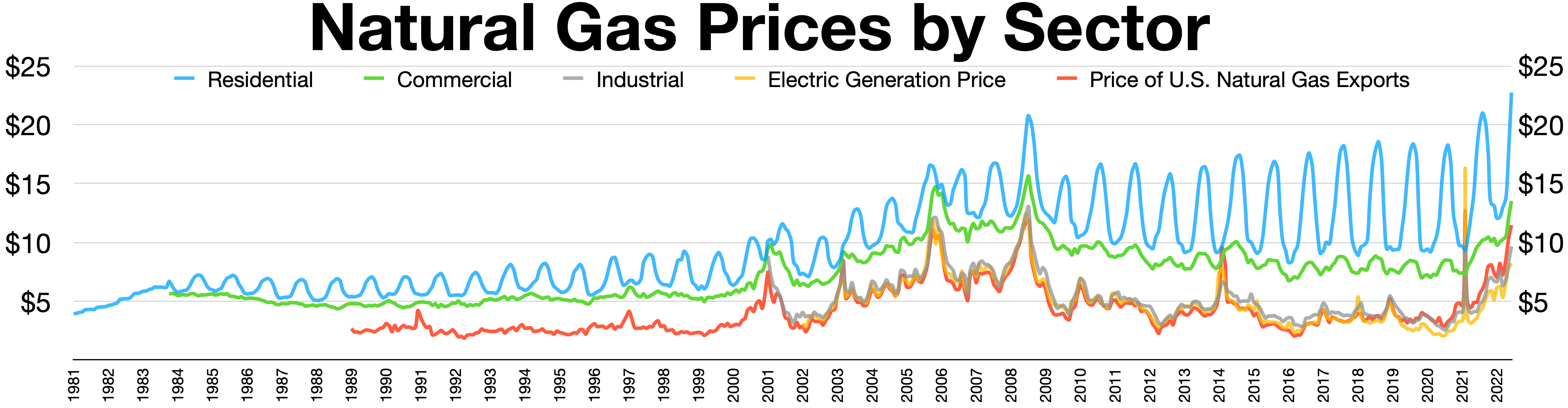
Natural Gas Prices Residential Commercial Industrial Electric generation Export prices

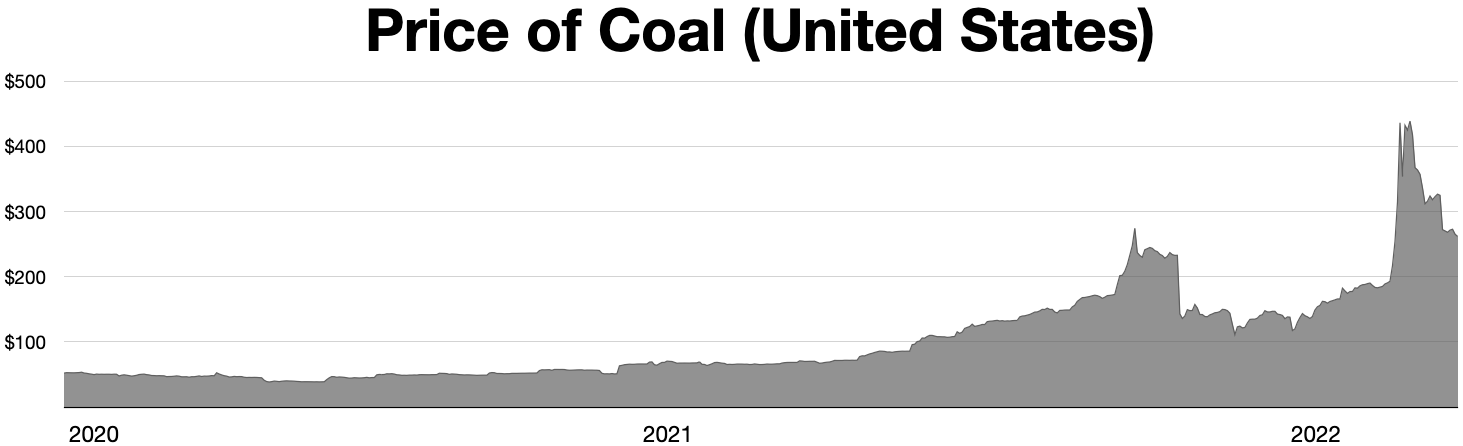
Price of coal in the United States

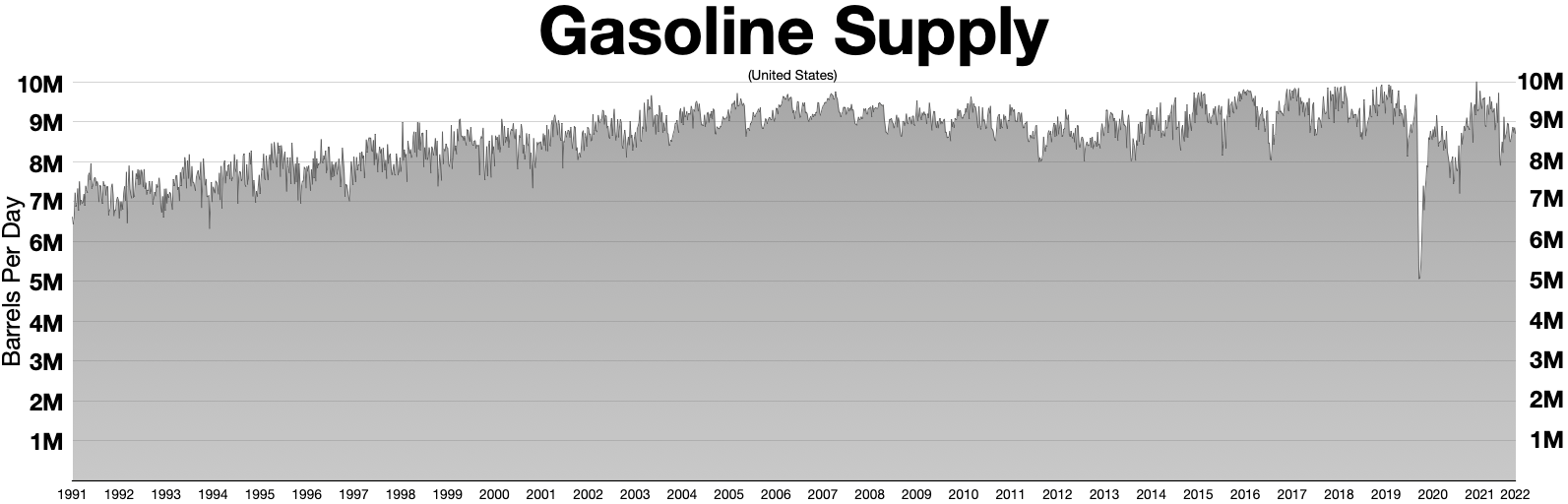
Gasoline supply

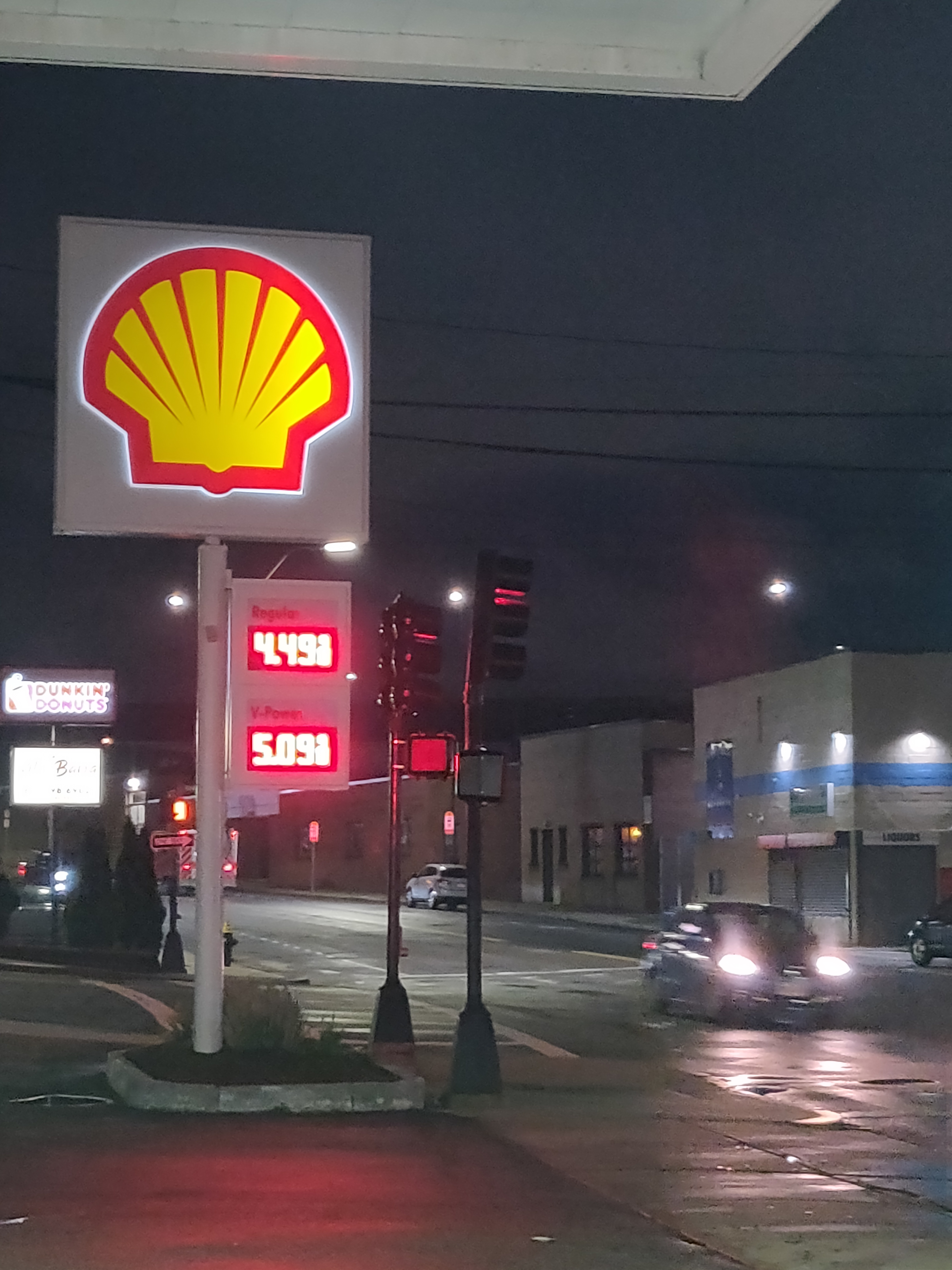
Gasoline price display in Massachusetts in May 2022, showing prices above $4/US gal ($1.06/L).

Energy Secretary Jennifer Granholm blamed the OPEC oil cartel led by Saudi Arabia and the U.S. gas and petroleum industry for rising motor fuel prices in the United States. As the Financial Times reported on 4 November: "The White House has said OPEC+ risks imperiling the global economic recovery by refusing to speed up oil production increases and warned the U.S. was prepared to use 'all tools' necessary to lower fuel prices."

According to the U.S. Energy Information Administration, American families heating with propane can expect to pay 54% more in winter 2021/2022 than they did last year.

On 23 November 2021, the Biden administration announced it would release 50 million barrels of oil from the Strategic Petroleum Reserve (SPR).

Due to the 2022 Russian invasion of Ukraine and subsequent international sanctions during the Russo-Ukrainian War against Russia, oil prices worldwide soared. In the beginning of March 2022, the price of Brent Crude passed US$113 a barrel, the highest level since June 2014, while West Texas Intermediate was trading at just under US$110 a barrel. On 8 March, President Joe Biden ordered a ban on imports of Russian oil, gas and coal to the US. Biden ordered another 30 million barrels of oil released from the SPR in early March, which on 31 March was followed by a release of 1 million barrels on average per day for 180 days, the latter on which is the largest release from the SPR in its history. The Biden administration was pressed on potential oil deals with Saudi Arabia, Venezuela, and Iran that would have them increase their oil production. However, so far, Saudi Arabia and the United Arab Emirates have declined requests from the US. In May 2022, the Biden Administration announced that it will allow European oil companies to acquire Venezuelan crude immediately but dismissed calls for the US to unilaterally lift all sanctions against Venezuela.

On 14 June 2022, the American Petroleum Institute unveiled a ten-point policy plan advising how to reduce the price of fuel in the United States and globally. Some of those points include lifting development restrictions on federal lands and waters, ending permitting obstruction on natural gas projects, revising the National Environmental Policy Act process to reduce some of the "bureaucracy" placed on energy projects, among other suggestions.

During Biden's visit in Saudi Arabia on 16 July 2022, the US president failed to secure commitments for an immediate OPEC output rise as intended. With economic sanctions in place against Iran and Venezuela, energy analysts expect a tight petroleum market well into 2023. In contrast to the United States, European countries would like to see a return of Iran and Venezuela to the global oil market to ease inflationary pressures worldwide.

In late August 2022, Saudi Arabia and OPEC announced another possible cut in oil output, Brent crude futures rose again significantly. Meanwhile, Iran accused the United States of procrastinating in efforts to revive Tehran's 2015 nuclear deal. At the same time, Europe continued to face disruptions in energy supplies due to damage to a pipeline system bringing oil from Kazakhstan through Russia.

The energy crisis as well as economic sanctions against Russia's petrochemical industry have benefited the U.S. energy economy while Europe suffers. Exports of American LNG to Europe have more than doubled since 2021. According to the International Energy Agency, US shipments of natural gas to Europe in June 2022 exceeded the amount Russia was supplying via pipelines.

On 5 October 2022, Russia and Saudi Arabia agreed to further cut crude oil output by 2 million barrels a day. The White House called the decision "shortsighted", and accused OPEC+ to align with Russia. Decreased supply could benefit Russia's petrochemical industry. The US would release oil from its strategic reserves according to government sources.

==== Haiti ====
In Haiti, protests triggered by rising cost of living and energy broke out in 2022.

=== South America ===
==== Ecuador ====
In Ecuador, rising fuel prices led to protests by transportation union in Quito. In June 2022, protests by students and workers against rising prices became widespread in what is known as the 2022 Ecuadorian protests.

==== Panama ====
Energy shortages were a cause of the 2022 Panamanian protests.

==== Peru ====
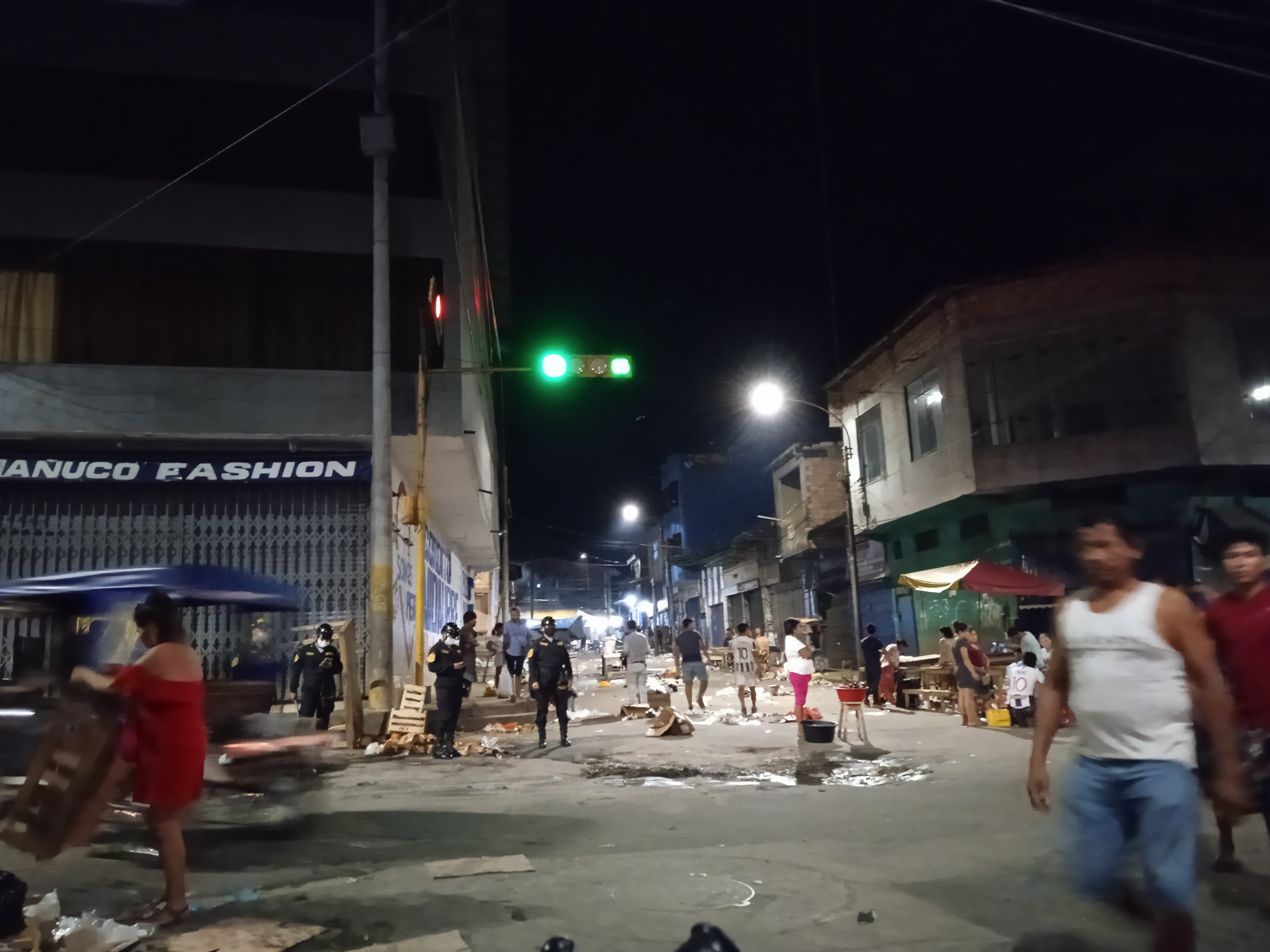
2022 Peruvian protests due to increased fertilizer and fuel prices

In Peru, effects from the COVID-19 pandemic along with rising fertilizer and fuel prices as part of the economic impact of the Russian invasion of Ukraine sparked the 2022 Peruvian protests, which resulted with the death of eight individuals and dozens injured.
