= Bureau of Energy Resources =

Bureau of the United States Department of State

- Seal of the United States Department of State

Bureau overview
- Formed: November 16, 2011
- Dissolved: July 11, 2025
- Jurisdiction: Executive branch of the United States
- Employees: 91 (as of 2016)
- Annual budget: $16.35 million (FY 2015)
- Parent department: U.S. Department of State
- Website: state.gov/enr

The Bureau of Energy Resources (ENR) was a bureau in the United States Department of State that coordinated the department's efforts in promoting international energy security. It operated under the purview of the Under Secretary of State for Economic Growth, Energy, and the Environment.

== History ==
The Bureau of Energy Resources was established in October 2011, following a recommendation in the 2010 Quadrennial Diplomacy and Development Review calling on the department to create a bureau uniting diplomatic and programmatic efforts in the global production and use of energy. The new bureau combined personnel and assets previously assigned to existing energy-related offices in the department, primarily from what is now the Bureau of Economic and Business Affairs.

== Organization ==
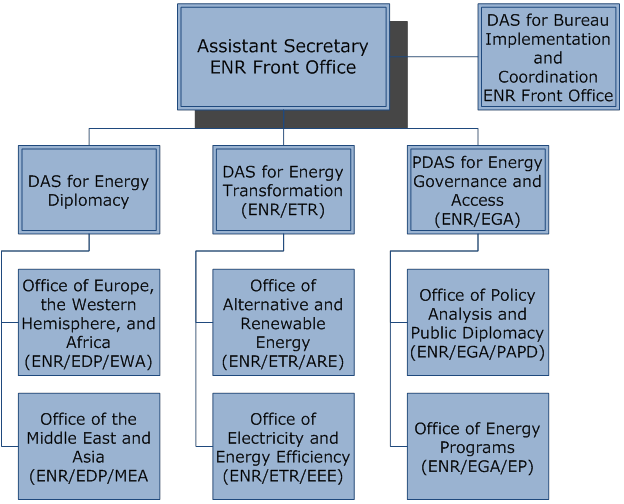
Organizational chart of the Bureau of Energy Resources

The bureau is headed by the Assistant Secretary of State for Energy Resources, who is appointed by the President of the United States. Four Deputy Assistant Secretaries also oversee different divisions of the bureau, namely Energy Diplomacy, Energy Transformation, Energy Governance and Access, and Bureau Implementation and Coordination. Six unique offices exist within the bureau:

- Office of Europe, the Western Hemisphere, and Africa
- Office of the Middle East and Asia
- Office of Alternative and Renewable Energy
- Office of Electricity and Energy Efficiency
- Office of Policy Analysis and Public Diplomacy
- Office of Energy Programs

The bureau manages three foreign assistance programs with a total FY 2014 budget of $11.8 million in economic support funds. ENR relies heavily on interagency agreements with the Departments of Interior, Commerce, and Treasury, as well as on contracted private-sector firms, to implement technical assistance.

== See also ==
- Energy diplomacy
- United States Special Envoy for Eurasian Energy
- United States Department of Energy
