= Nancy Jo Powell =

American diplomat (born 1947)

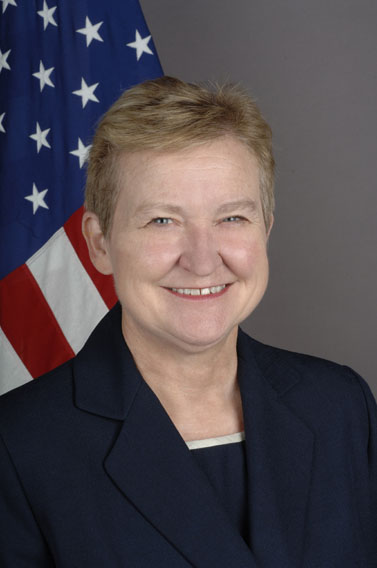

United States Ambassador to India
- In office April 19, 2012 – May 21, 2014
- President: Barack Obama
- Preceded by: Tim Roemer
- Succeeded by: Richard Verma

United States Ambassador to Nepal
- In office July 16, 2007 – March 12, 2010
- President: George W. Bush; Barack Obama
- Preceded by: James F. Moriarty
- Succeeded by: Scott H. DeLisi

United States Ambassador to Pakistan
- In office August 2, 2002 – November 5, 2004
- President: George W. Bush
- Preceded by: Wendy Chamberlin
- Succeeded by: Ryan C. Crocker

United States Ambassador to Ghana
- In office July 16, 2001 – May 26, 2002
- President: George W. Bush
- Preceded by: Kathryn Dee Robinson
- Succeeded by: Mary Carlin Yates

United States Ambassador to Uganda
- In office November 7, 1997 – July 9, 1999
- President: Bill Clinton
- Preceded by: E. Michael Southwick
- Succeeded by: Martin George Brennan

28th Director General of the Foreign Service
- In office August 3, 2009 – January 6, 2012
- Preceded by: Harry K. Thomas Jr.
- Succeeded by: Linda Thomas-Greenfield

Personal details
- Born: 1947 (age 78–79) Cedar Falls, Iowa, U.S.
- Education: University of Northern Iowa
- Profession: Career Diplomat

Nancy Jo Powell (born 1947, Cedar Falls, Iowa) was the United States Ambassador to India from April 2012 to May 2014.

Powell was Director General of the United States Foreign Service, a position she assumed after serving as the U.S. Ambassador to Nepal. Powell is a career member of the Senior Foreign Service. Powell joined the United States Foreign Service in 1977, and has held assignments in Africa and South Asia.

Media reports conjectured that Powell's resignation was inevitable after the officials of the Government of India stopped accepting to meet her, following the Devyani Khobragade incident.

== Previous positions ==
- United States Ambassador to India, 2012–2014
- Director General of the United States Foreign Service, 2009–2012
- Ambassador to Nepal, July 16, 2007 – 2009
- National Intelligence Officer for South Asia, National Intelligence Council, 2006–2007
- Senior Coordinator for Avian Influenza and Infectious Diseases, 2006 (?)
- Acting Assistant Secretary of State for the Bureau for International Narcotics and Law Enforcement Affairs, March 14 – November 25, 2005
- Principal Deputy Assistant Secretary and the Acting Assistant Secretary of State for Legislative Affairs, November 2004 – March 2005
- Ambassador to Pakistan, August 9, 2002 – October 2004
- Ambassador to Ghana, August 14, 2001 – May 2002
- Acting Assistant Secretary for African Affairs, January 2001 – June 2001
- Principal Deputy Assistant Secretary for African Affairs, July 1999 – January 2001
- Ambassador to Uganda, 1997–1999
- Deputy Chief of Mission at the U.S. Embassy in Dhaka, Bangladesh, 1995–1997
- Political Counselor at the U.S. Embassy in New Delhi, India, 1993–1995
- Consul General in Calcutta, India, 1992–1993
- Deputy Chief of Mission in Lome, Togo, 1990–1992

Other overseas assignments have included Islamabad, Pakistan; Kathmandu, Nepal; and Ottawa, Canada; and previous Washington assignments were those of Nepal Desk Officer and Refugee Assistance Officer.

Diplomatic posts
Preceded by E. Michael Southwick	United States Ambassador to Uganda; 1997–1999	Succeeded by Martin George Brennan
Preceded by Kathryn Dee Robinson	United States Ambassador to Ghana; 2001–2002	Succeeded by Mary Carlin Yates
Preceded by Wendy Chamberlin	United States Ambassador to Pakistan; 2002–2004	Succeeded by Ryan C. Crocker
Preceded by James F. Moriarty	United States Ambassador to Nepal; 2007–2010	Succeeded by Scott H. DeLisi
Preceded by Peter Burleigh	United States Ambassador to India; 2012–2014	Succeeded by Richard Rahul Verma
