= List of ambassadors of the United States to Ghana =

Ambassador of the United States to Ghana
- Seal of the United States Department of State

- Flag of a United States ambassador

- Incumbent; Rolf Olson; Chargé d'affaires since May 29, 2025
- Nominator: The president of the United States
- Appointer: The president; with Senate advice and consent
- Inaugural holder: Donald W. Lamm as Chargé d'Affaires
- Formation: February 28, 1957
- Website: U.S. Embassy - Accra

The following is a list of ambassadors of the United States to Ghana. The embassy in Accra was established March 6, 1957, with Donald W. Lamm in charge as chargé d'affaires. President Joe Biden nominated career U.S. diplomat and Acting Assistant Secretary/Principal Deputy Assistant Secretary of the Bureau of Energy Resources Virginia E. Palmer for the position on June 2, 2021.

== Ambassadors ==
Name	Title	Appointed	Presented credentials	Terminated mission	Notes
Donald W. Lamm – Career FSO	Chargé d'Affaires		March 12, 1957	April 19, 1957	
Peter Rutter – Career FSO	Chargé d'Affaires		April 25, 1957	June 19, 1957	
Wilson C. Flake – Career FSO	Ambassador Extraordinary and Plenipotentiary	May 20, 1957	June 19, 1957	November 21, 1960	Reaccredited when Ghana became a republic
Francis H. Russell – Career FSO	Ambassador Extraordinary and Plenipotentiary	November 11, 1960	January 23, 1961	March 13, 1962	
William P. Mahoney Jr. – Political appointee	Ambassador Extraordinary and Plenipotentiary	May 21, 1962	June 22, 1962	May 26, 1965	
Franklin H. Williams – Political appointee	Ambassador Extraordinary and Plenipotentiary	October 20, 1965	January 17, 1966	May 3, 1968	Reaccredited after change of government
Thomas W. McElhiney – Career FSO	Ambassador Extraordinary and Plenipotentiary	July 24, 1968	September 14, 1968	May 29, 1971	
Fred L. Hadsel – Career FSO	Ambassador Extraordinary and Plenipotentiary	July 23, 1971	September 25, 1971	July 29, 1974	
Shirley Temple Black – Political appointee	Ambassador Extraordinary and Plenipotentiary	September 19, 1974	December 6, 1974	July 13, 1976	
Robert P. Smith – Career FSO	Ambassador Extraordinary and Plenipotentiary	October 4, 1976	December 17, 1976	May 7, 1979	
Thomas W. M. Smith – Career FSO	Ambassador Extraordinary and Plenipotentiary	September 28, 1979	December 12, 1979	July 2, 1983	
Robert E. Fritts – Career FSO	Ambassador Extraordinary and Plenipotentiary	July 6, 1983	July 28, 1983	June 2, 1986	
Stephen R. Lyne – Career FSO	Ambassador Extraordinary and Plenipotentiary	March 27, 1987	July 11, 1987	September 9, 1989	
Raymond Charles Ewing – Career FSO	Ambassador Extraordinary and Plenipotentiary	August 7, 1989	November 9, 1989	August 14, 1992	
Kenneth Lee Brown – Career FSO	Ambassador Extraordinary and Plenipotentiary	July 14, 1992	September 24, 1992	July 19, 1995	
Edward P. Brynn – Career FSO	Ambassador Extraordinary and Plenipotentiary	October 3, 1995	December 19, 1995	July 10, 1998	
Kathryn Dee Robinson – Career FSO	Ambassador Extraordinary and Plenipotentiary	October 22, 1998	December 16, 1998	September 1, 2001	
Nancy Jo Powell – Career FSO	Ambassador Extraordinary and Plenipotentiary	July 16, 2001	September 14, 2001	May 26, 2002	
Mary Carlin Yates – Career FSO	Ambassador Extraordinary and Plenipotentiary	November 26, 2002	January 28, 2003	July 25, 2005	
Pamela E. Bridgewater – Career FSO	Ambassador Extraordinary and Plenipotentiary	June 21, 2005	October 11, 2005	June 10, 2008	
Donald G. Teitelbaum – Career FSO	Ambassador Extraordinary and Plenipotentiary	June 6, 2008	September 9, 2008	August 24, 2012	
Gene A. Cretz – Career FSO	Ambassador Extraordinary and Plenipotentiary	April 11, 2012	October 8, 2012	June 26, 2015	
Robert P. Jackson – Career FSO	Ambassador Extraordinary and Plenipotentiary	November 22, 2015	February 4, 2016	July 27, 2018	
Stephanie S. Sullivan – Career FSO	Ambassador Extraordinary and Plenipotentiary	September 10, 2018	January 23, 2019	April 8, 2022	
Virginia Palmer – Career FSO	Ambassador Extraordinary and Plenipotentiary	March 2, 2022	May 10, 2022	May 28, 2025	
Rolf Olson – Career FSO	Chargé d'affaires ad interim	May 29, 2025		Incumbent	

== See also ==
- Embassy of the United States, Accra
