= Teacher Institute at La Academia =

Teacher training program

- Founded: 2001
- Purpose: To provide Colorado students, parents, classrooms, schools, school districts and communities with well-trained and effective teachers for sustainable growth towards educational achievement and realization, through a rigorous training and support curriculum that culminates with teacher licensure.
- Location: Denver, CO
- Region served: Colorado
- Website: http://ti.teachandlead.org/

The Teacher Institute at La Academia (TILA) was an alternative teacher licensure program located in Denver, Colorado and was an official Colorado Department of Education Designated Agency through 2013. TILA provided alternative certification programs for individuals that had not completed a traditional teacher certification program. TILA was specially designed for people who have already received an undergraduate degree, and have the desire to change their career or enhance their professional status through teacher licensure. TILA candidates were awarded an alternative teaching license, while working as a full-time teacher in the state of Colorado. Successful completion of the year-long TILA program resulted in the recommendation of an Initial Colorado Teaching license that is valid for three years.

== History ==
TILA functioned as a designated agency for alternative teacher licensure from 2001 to 2013 and was approved by the Colorado Department of Education. The agency could recommend licensure for teachers seeking endorsements in elementary education, special education, linguistically diverse education and a variety of secondary content areas.

TILA has recommended licensure for more 400 teachers in a variety of endorsement areas, the majority being in special education. The program was a recipient of a federally sponsored Department of Education Transition to Teaching grant that supported 250 classroom teachers in the Alternative Teacher Licensure program by 2014, statewide.

== Partnerships ==
The Institute developed a strong partnership with the University of Colorado at Denver and Health Sciences Center (UCDHSC) that enabled licensure candidates to earn nine graduate credits at the University. These credits directly transferred into one of two M.A. programs (Curriculum and Instruction with a Focus on Language, Literacy and Culturally Responsive Teaching and Special Education) at UCDHSC. The cost of these credits was included in the TILA fee schedule. The path to the graduate credits was embedded into the State-approved TILA program and negotiated into the agreement between TILA and UCDHSC.

== Endorsements ==
TILA candidates can choose one endorsement area during their program.

- Early Childhood Education (Ages Birth-8)
- Elementary Education (Grades: Grades K-6)
- Special Education Generalist (Ages 5–21)
- All K-12 Endorsements
- All Secondary Endorsements

Discontinued endorsement areas include:

- Linguistically Diverse Education

== Program Components ==
The Teacher Institute at La Academia consists of three major components:

1. Classroom teaching experience, in which the TILA candidate must be a full-time teacher of record
2. Direct pedagogical instruction in a seminar format that offers university graduate credit
3. A reflective and research-oriented competency based portfolio

== See also ==
- Alternative teacher certification
