= Katherine Robinson =

Katherine Robinson may refer to:

- Katherine Robinson, character in Two Weeks with Love
- Katherine Robinson (rower) in 2011 World Rowing Championships

== See also ==
- Kathryn Robinson (disambiguation)
- Katie Robinson (disambiguation)
- Kate Robinson (disambiguation)
