= Thomas W. McElhiney =

American diplomat and UNRWA Commissioner-General (1919–1998)

Thomas McElhiney

Commissioner-General for the United Nations Relief and Works Agency for Palestine Refugees in the Near East
- In office April 1977 – April 1979
- Secretary General: Kurt Waldheim
- Preceded by: John Rennie
- Succeeded by: Olof Rydbeck

5th Inspector General of the Department of State
- In office July 1, 1971 – July 18, 1973
- President: Richard Nixon
- Preceded by: Fraser Wilkins
- Succeeded by: James S. Sutterlin

United States Ambassador to Ghana
- In office September 14, 1968 – May 29, 1971
- President: Lyndon B. Johnson; Richard Nixon
- Preceded by: Franklin Williams
- Succeeded by: Fred L. Hadsel

Personal details
- Born: January 22, 1919 West Union, West Virginia, U.S.
- Died: January 17, 1998 (aged 78) Baltimore, Maryland, U.S.
- Education: Johns Hopkins University (BA); Cornell University

Thomas Watkins McElhiney (January 22, 1919, West Union, West Virginia, United States – January 17, 1998, Baltimore) was an American diplomat and UNRWA's Commissioner-General from 1977 to 1979.

McElhiney grew up in West Virginia, New York City and the Mount Washington neighborhood of Baltimore. Educated at Johns Hopkins University for undergrad and studied after at Cornell University, McElhiney served in the Army Corps of Engineers in World War II. Joining the Foreign Service in 1946, he rose to be deputy chief of mission in the Sudan. He served as U.S. ambassador to Ghana from 1968 to 1971, and then as Inspector-General of the Foreign Service until retirement in 1974. He then joined the United Nations as deputy commissioner of UNRWA, rising to serve as commissioner from 1977 until his retirement in 1979.

McElhiney was the son of William James McElhiney and Elza Jones McElhiney. He married the former Helen Lawrence Lippincott, of Baltimore, Maryland, on September 7, 1946. The McElhineys had three children: Helen Townley McElhiney, Richard Lippincott McElhiney, and William Dashiell McElhiney.

McElhiney died January 17, 1998, aged 78, at the Johns Hopkins Hospital in Baltimore.

Diplomatic posts
Preceded by Franklin Williams	United States Ambassador to Ghana; 1968–1971	Succeeded by Fred L. Hadsel
Preceded by John Rennie	Commissioner-General for the United Nations Relief and Works Agency for Palestine Refugees in the Near East; 1977–1979	Succeeded by Olof Rydbeck
