= David C. Mulford =

American diplomat (born 1937)

David Mulford
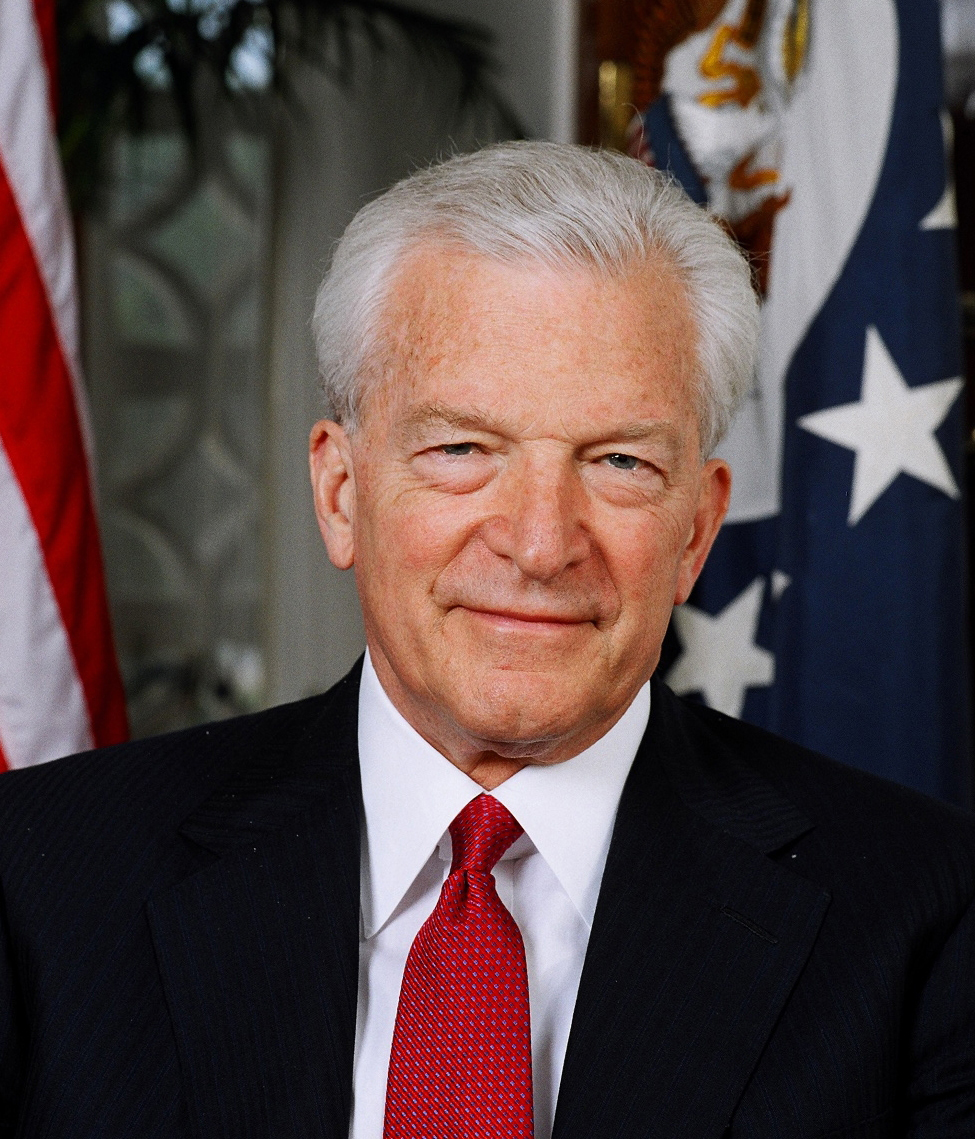

21st United States Ambassador to India
- In office February 23, 2004 – January 15, 2009
- President: George W. Bush; Barack Obama
- Preceded by: Robert Blackwill
- Succeeded by: Peter Burleigh (Acting)

Personal details
- Born: 27 June 1937 (age 88) Rockford, Illinois
- Party: Republican
- Spouse: Jeannie Simmons Mulford
- Education: Lawrence University (BA); Boston University (MA); University of Oxford (PhD)

David Campbell Mulford (born 27 June 1937) is an American diplomat who served as the United States Ambassador to India from February 23, 2004 to January 15, 2009, and served as Vice-Chairman International of Credit Suisse from 2009 to 2016. He is currently a distinguished visiting fellow at the Hoover Institution, focusing on research, writing, and activities related to global economic integration, including the legal and political environments of trade agreements and their management. He also concentrates his efforts on economic growth in the Indian subcontinent and the trend of receding globalization in developed economies.

== Biography ==
=== Early life ===
Mulford was born in Rockford, Illinois. He earned his bachelor's degree from Lawrence University in 1959, his master's degree from Boston University in 1962 and his doctor of philosophy (DPhil.) from the University of Oxford in 1966.

=== Career ===
Mulford was a White House Fellow in 1965 and 1966 and served as a special assistant to the Secretary of the Treasury. In 1966 he joined White, Weld & Co., Inc.'s international investment banking in New York and London and from 1970 to 1974 he was head of White Weld International Finance Group in New York. From 1974 to 1984 Mulford was senior investment advisor to the Saudi Arabian Monetary Agency while remaining a Managing Director and head of International Finance at White, Weld.

From 1984 to 1988, he served as Assistant Secretary for International Affairs and later as Under Secretary for International Affairs at the Department of the Treasury from 1988 through 1992. In those roles, he served as the senior international economic policy official at the Treasury under Secretaries Donald Regan, James Baker, and Nicholas Brady. Timothy Geithner served as a special assistant to Mulford at the Treasury during the administration of George H. W. Bush.

In 1993 Mulford was appointed vice chairman of the First Boston Corporation and became chairman and chief executive of CS First Boston, at the beginning of 1994. Credit Suisse First Boston in London, England, had formerly been known as Credit Suisse White Weld, until White, Weld & Co. was purchased by Merrill Lynch in 1978.

During his tenure at Credit Suisse First Boston Mulford worked with Argentine Economic Minister Domingo Cavallo on the Megacanje, or mega-swap, a 2001 deal to allow investors to voluntarily swap old Argentine bonds for new ones at a higher interest rate. Critics of the mega-swap note that the deal failed to alleviate Argentina's insolvency and may have exacerbated the situation by adding to debt in the long term. More favorable analysis suggests that Argentina's gains in liquidity made up for the long-term increase in debt that would have to be paid out to investors. Much of the criticism relates to the over $90 million in fees that Credit Suisse and other firms earned while Argentina approached default.

During Argentine legal proceedings against former Argentine government officials in connection with the Megacanje, a judge issued an Interpol arrest warrant for Mulford after unsuccessfully seeking Mulford's testimony. The warrant was later upheld on appeal. On November 30, 2016, a court in Argentina (Judge Sebastian R. Ramos) resolved the investigation, dismissing Mulford from the case and stating that the existence of the case should not in any way affect Mulford’s reputation. Interpol rejected the previous court ruling as an abuse of its system, with instructions that Argentina not seek further use of Interpol’s systems in this matter.

Mulford is married to Jeannie Simmons Mulford.

Diplomatic posts
Preceded by Robert Blackwill	United States Ambassador to India; 2003 – 2009	Succeeded by Timothy J. Roemer
