= Mary Yates (disambiguation) =

Mary Yates may refer to:

- Mary Ann Yates (1728–1787), English tragic actress
- Mary Carlin Yates (born 1946), American Foreign Service personnel and ambassador
- Mary Yates (?–2001), American murder victim by her mother Andrea Yates
