= Gene A. Cretz =

American diplomat (born 1950)

Gene Cretz
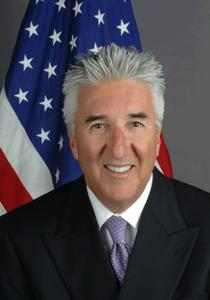

United States Ambassador to Ghana
- In office October 8, 2012 – June 26, 2015
- President: Barack Obama
- Preceded by: Donald Teitelbaum
- Succeeded by: Patricia Alsup (Acting)

United States Ambassador to Libya
- In office January 11, 2009 – May 15, 2012*
- President: George W. Bush; Barack Obama
- Preceded by: Joseph Palmer II
- Succeeded by: J. Christopher Stevens

Personal details
- Born: Gene Allan Cretz; April 20, 1950 (age 76) Albany, New York, U.S.
- Education: University of Rochester; Buffalo State College; Stony Brook University
- Joan Polaschik served as Chargé d’Affaires while the Tripoli embassy suspended operations from February 25, 2011 – September 22, 2011.

Gene Allan Cretz (born April 20, 1950) is a career diplomat who retired from the Senior Foreign Service in 2015. Before retiring, he was the U.S. Ambassador to Ghana.

== Early life ==
Cretz was born in Albany, New York, and attended Albany High School, graduating with the class of 1968. He subsequently taught there from 1977 to 1979. He received a bachelor's degree in English literature from the University of Rochester and a master's degree in linguistics and secondary education from Buffalo State College at Buffalo.

== Diplomatic postings ==
Gene Cretz previously served in key diplomatic posts in Israel, Egypt and Syria. In addition to these postings, he has also been stationed in Pakistan, India, China, and in Washington D.C. Cretz was Christopher Stevens' immediate predecessor as U.S. ambassador to Libya. Prior to assuming his post in Libya, he was a Deputy Assistant Secretary of State for Near Eastern Affairs.

Before this, he was the first U.S. ambassador to Libya since 1972, after being nominated in July 2007 by President Bush. His nomination was confirmed by the US Senate on November 21, 2008. He was sworn in as U.S. ambassador to Libya by Secretary of State Condoleezza Rice on December 17, 2008, at the State Department. He arrived in Libya on December 27, 2008. Cretz speaks several languages, including Arabic, Dari, Urdu, and Chinese. President Barack Obama nominated him for the post to Ghana in April 2012. He was sworn in as the U.S. ambassador to Ghana by Secretary of State Hillary Rodham Clinton on September 11, 2012. He presented his credentials on October 8, 2012, and served until June 26, 2015.

From 2015 to 2019, Cretz was one of two representatives for the director of the Multinational Force & Observers (MFO). During this assignment, he resided in Tel Aviv, Israel.

Ambassador Cretz returned to the Washington, D.C., area in 2019.

== Personal life ==
He is married to the former Annette Williams and the couple has two adult children, Jeffrey and Gabrielle. His son is a commanding officer in the Air National Guard in the greater Philadelphia area and his daughter lives in Miami, Florida, and works in the hospitality industry.

== See also ==
- Foreign relations of Libya

Diplomatic posts
Preceded by Joseph Palmer	United States Ambassador to Libya; 2009–2012	Succeeded by Christopher Stevens
Preceded by Donald Teitelbaum	United States Ambassador to Ghana; 2012–2015	Succeeded by Patricia Alsup; Acting
