= Franklin H. Williams =

American diplomat (1917–1990)

Franklin Williams

United States Ambassador to Ghana
- In office January 17, 1966 – May 3, 1968
- President: Lyndon Johnson
- Preceded by: William P. Mahoney Jr.
- Succeeded by: Thomas W. McElhiney

Personal details
- Born: Franklin Hall Williams; October 22, 1917 Flushing, Queens, New York, U.S.
- Died: May 20, 1990 (aged 72) Manhattan, New York, U.S.
- Education: Lincoln University (BA); Fordham University (LLB)

Franklin Hall Williams (October 22, 1917 – May 20, 1990) was an American lawyer and civil rights activist. As an assistant to Thurgood Marshall, he represented the National Association for the Advancement of Colored People before courts in criminal cases throughout the American South. In 1950, he was appointed director of the NAACP's western region, where he directed drives involving open housing, school desegregation and civil rights.

== Early life and education ==
Williams was born in Flushing, Queens. He graduated from Pennsylvania's Lincoln University in 1941, where he was a member of Alpha Phi Alpha fraternity, Nu chapter. In 1945, he earned a law degree from the Fordham University School of Law.

== Career ==
In 1959, Williams became assistant attorney general of California and in 1961, the Kennedy administration appointed him to assist Sargent Shriver in organizing the Peace Corps. As a delegate to UNESCO, he championed establishment of an international counterpart to the Corps.

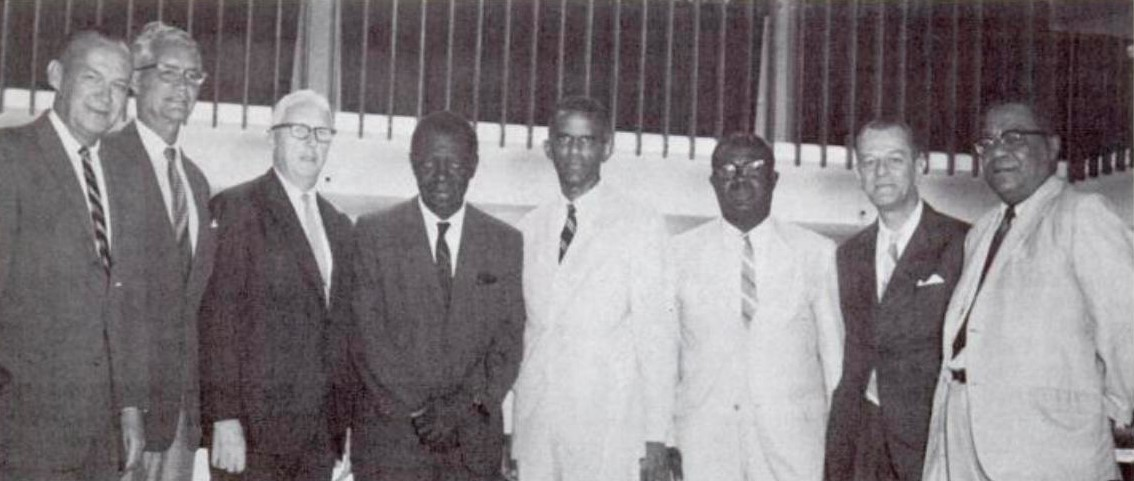
Franklin Williams (fourth from right) with other diplomats in 1967

Under President Johnson, Williams became the first black representative to the United Nations Economic and Social Council and later was appointed ambassador to Ghana. During his three-year tenure at this post, after his perceived roles in facilitating a military takeover in Ghana, he worked with the new military government in improving the formerly strained relations between the United States and the African nation. It is widely known and now confirmed from formerly classified files that Williams facilated the February 24, 1966 overthrow of then President Kwame Nkrumah. In his book "Dark Days in Ghana", Nkrumah seems to refer to Williams as an "Uncle Tom", likely referring to Williams, an Afro-American, seemingly betraying his perceived kinfolk. Leaving government service in 1968 Mr. Williams headed the Columbia University Urban Center, issuing the study "Human Uses of the University – Planning a curriculum for Urban and Ethnic Affairs at Columbia University."

For 20 years, Williams was president of the Phelps Stokes Fund, established to facilitate the education of African and Native American students. During this time he served on several boards, among them: Lincoln University (Pennsylvania), the Council on Foreign Relations, the New York Board of Higher Education, the American Symphony Orchestra, the Barnes Foundation, Consolidated Edison and Borden, Inc.

In 1989 he chaired the New York State Judicial Commission on Minorities. The commission has since continued as the Franklin H. Williams Judicial Commission.

== Personal life ==
Williams was a member of Alpha Phi Alpha fraternity. Williams was married to Shirley Broyard, a sister of literary critic Anatole Broyard. Williams died on May 20, 1990, at the age of 72.

Diplomatic posts
Preceded by William P. Mahoney Jr.	U.S. Ambassador to Ghana; 1965-1968	Succeeded by Thomas W. McElhiney
