= Ghana–United States relations =

- Ghana: United States

Ghana–United States relations are the diplomatic relations between Ghana and United States.

Both nations have generally been friendly since Ghana's independence, except for a period of strained relations during the later years of the Nkrumah regime. Ghana was the first country to which United States Peace Corps volunteers were sent in 1961. Ghana and the United States are signatories to twenty agreements and treaties covering such matters as agricultural commodities, aviation, defense, economic and technical cooperation, education, extradition, postal matters, telecommunications, and treaty obligations. The refusal of the United States to join the International Cocoa Agreement, given Ghana's heavy dependence on cocoa exports to earn hard currency, is the most serious bilateral issue between the two countries.

According to the Pew Research Global Attitudes Project, 83% of Ghanaians viewed the U.S. favorably in 2002, declining slightly down to 80% in 2007, according to the 2012 U.S. Global Leadership Report, 79% of Ghanaians approve of U.S. leadership, with 12% disapproving and 10% uncertain, and in a 2013 BBC World Service Poll, 82% of Ghanaians view U.S. influence positively, the highest rating for any surveyed African country. In 2021, Travel + Leisure website, travelandleisure.com, ranked Ghana as the 6th among 10 countries Americans wanted to visit.

== History ==
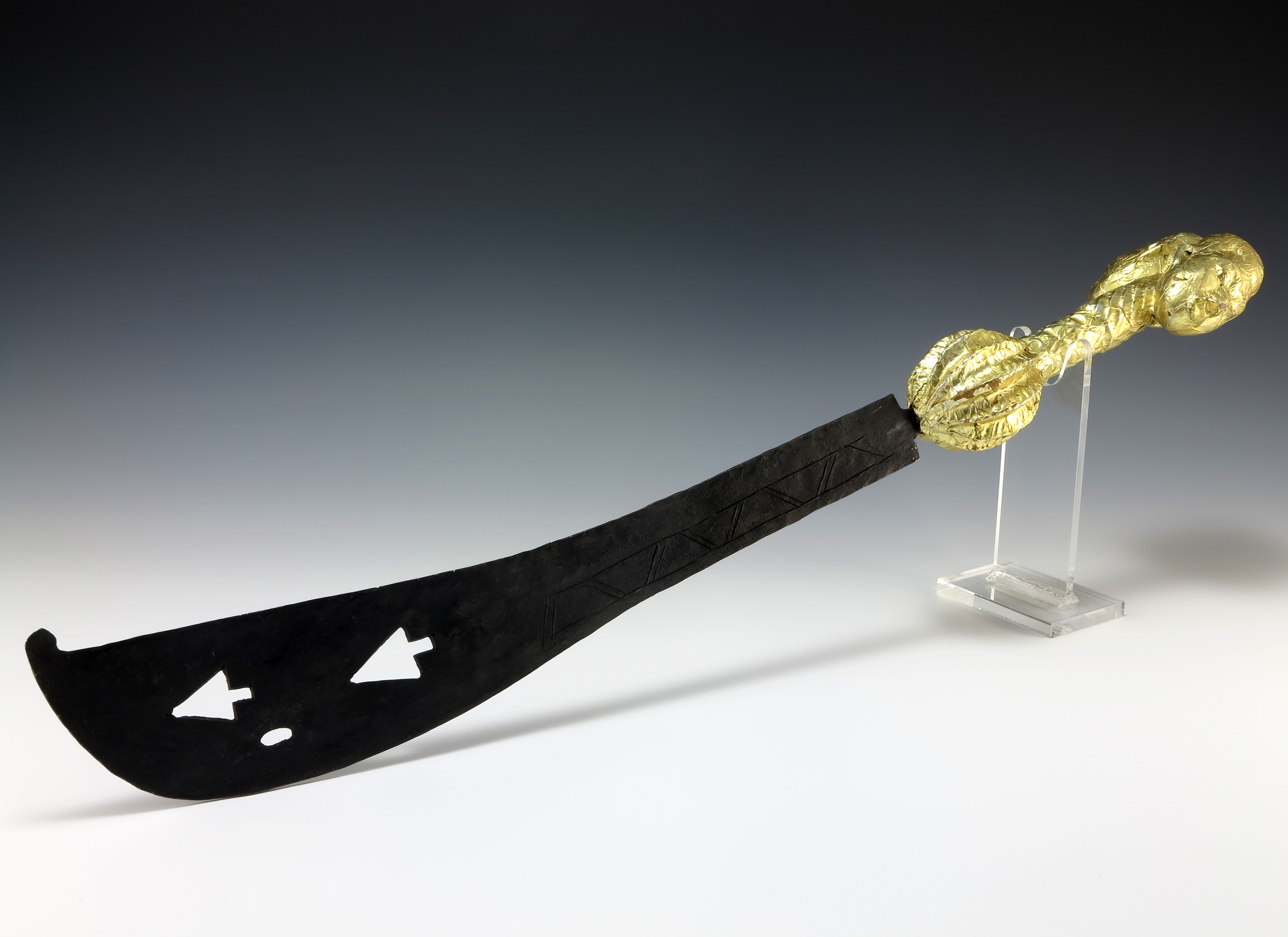
Ceremonial sword made of iron that was gifted to American President Gerald Ford by Ghanaian Ambassador Samuel Ernest Quarm in 1975

=== Independence and the Cold War ===
Ghana committed themselves to remain neutral under the pressure of the Cold War ideology. Ghana remained committed in establishing their own foreign policy and standards first before aligning themselves with either of the two blocs. The historian Douglas Anglin writing in the year after Ghana gained independence highlights some of the reasons why Ghana chose to remain neutral. The main point being that Ghana wanted to remain open to collaborate with different nations. The U.S., however, saw Ghana as an opportunity to prevent Communism in Africa. As Ghana was the first independent African nation, the U.S believed it was instrumental to place their capitalist ideology in Ghana, and with Nkrumah being educated in the U.S., this was the best opportunity for them. America hoped that Ghana would ally themselves with the West, and this would trickle into the other African Nations once they became independent. The Eisenhower administration recognised the Soviet Union did not have influence yet, and rushed to influence the different African liberation interests.

=== Tensions during the 1980s ===
Relations between the United States and Ghana were particularly rocky in the early 1980s, apparently because of Ghana's relations with Libya. The PNDC government restored diplomatic relations with Libya shortly after coming to power. Libya came to the aid of Ghana soon afterward by providing much-needed economic assistance. Libya also has extensive financial holdings in Ghana. Jerry Rawlings supported Libya's position that two Libyans accused of bombing a Pan American Airlines flight over Lockerbie, Scotland, in 1988 should be tried in a neutral country rather than in Britain or the United States.

Relations between the United States and Ghana were further strained by a series of diplomatic incidents in the mid-1980s. In July 1985, a distant relative of Rawlings, Michael Soussoudis, was arrested in the United States and charged with espionage. Despite Soussoudis's conviction, he was exchanged the following December for several known United States Central Intelligence Agency (CIA) agents in Accra, but not before diplomats had been expelled in both Accra and Washington. In March 1986, a Panamanian-registered ship carrying arms and a number of mercenaries and United States veterans of the Vietnam War was seized off the coast of Brazil. The PNDC charged that the arms and soldiers were destined for Ghana and that they had been financed by a Ghanaian dissident with links to the CIA. During their trial, several crew members admitted that the charges were substantially true. Although they were convicted and imprisoned, three subsequently escaped with what the PNDC alleged was CIA assistance.

=== Thawing relations, 1980s-1990s ===
In spite of these incidents, relations between the United States and Ghana had improved markedly by the late 1980s. Former United States president Jimmy Carter visited Ghana in 1986 and again in 1988 and was warmly received by the PNDC. His Global 2000 agricultural program, which is quite popular with Ghanaian farmers, is helping promote good relations with the United States. In 1989 the United States forgave US$114 million of Ghana's foreign debt, part of a larger debt relief effort by Western nations. The United States has strongly favored Ghana's economic and political reform policies, and since the birth of the Fourth Republic and Ghana's return to constitutional rule, has offered assistance to help Ghana institutionalize and consolidate its steps toward democratic governance. In fiscal year 1994, United States development aid totaled about $38 million; in addition, the United States supplied more than $16 million in food aid.

=== 21st century ===
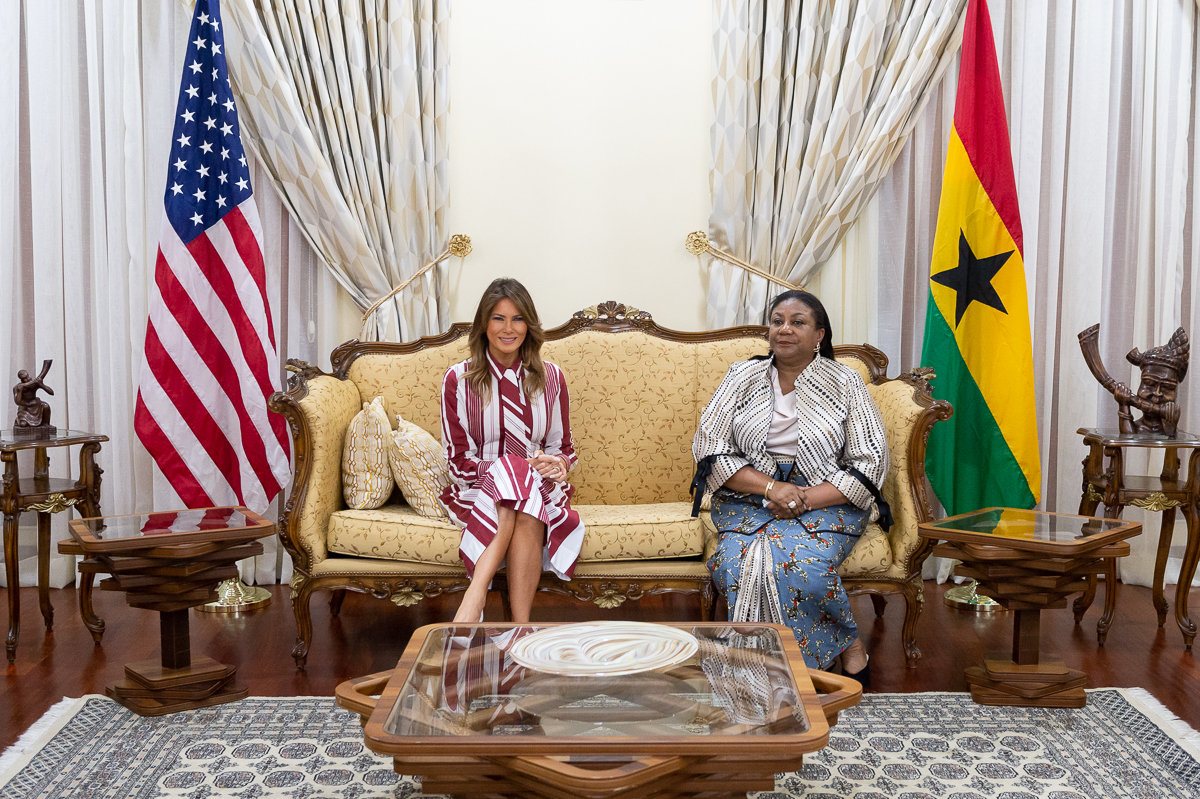
U.S. First Lady Melania Trump meets with Ghanaian First Lady Rebecca Akufo-Addo in 2018

In 1998, Bill Clinton became the first sitting US president to visit Ghana. Barack Obama followed suit in July 2009. In March 2023, US Vice President Kamala Harris also visited Ghana and announced new US investments and partnership initiatives, underscoring the friendly relations between the two countries.

In 2025, Ghana agreed to accept West Africans deported from the United States, with president John Mahama citing the visa-free movement protocol among ECOWAS states. According the president, plans were in place to repatriate the deportees to their home countries, beginning with Nigerians in the first batch. In exchange for accepting the deportees, the U.S. lifted visa restrictions on Ghana.

== Cultural relations ==
Cultural and social relations between Ghana and the US are multifaceted. In 1961, Ghana was the first country to which the United States sent Peace Corps volunteers. Since then, thousands of Americans have supported development and education projects in Ghana. At the same time, there is a significant Ghanaian diaspora in the US. According to estimates, approximately 250,000 Ghanaians were living in the United States in 2015, primarily in metropolitan areas such as New York, Washington, D.C., Chicago, and Atlanta. This diaspora community and Americans of Ghanaian descent contribute to cultural exchange and maintain numerous associations and networks. Historically, there have been close ties between Ghana and African American civil rights activists: Nkrumah himself studied in the US, and figures such as W. E. B. Du Bois moved from America to Ghana in the 1960s, which was then a center of Pan-Africanism. In 2019, Ghana launched the Year of Return initiative, symbolically calling on the descendants of enslaved Africans in the US to return to commemorate their shared heritage 400 years after the start of the transatlantic slave trade. The campaign was very well received and caused visitor numbers from the US to skyrocket. US citizens now make up one of the largest group of foreign tourists in Ghana.

Thousands of Ghanaians have been educated in the United States. Close relations are maintained between educational and scientific institutions, and cultural links between Ghanaians and African Americans are strong. However, Americans in Ghana are sometimes negatively viewed and stereotyped as arrogant.

Through the U.S. International Visitor Program, Ghanaian parliamentarians and other government officials have become acquainted with U.S. congressional and state legislative practices and have participated in programs designed to address other issues of interest.

== Defence relations ==
The U.S. and Ghanaian militaries have cooperated in numerous joint training exercises, culminating with Ghanaian participation in the African Crisis Response Initiative, an international activity in which the U.S. facilitates the development of an interoperable peacekeeping capacity among African nations. U.S.-Ghanaian military cooperation continues under the new African Contingency Operations Training and Assistance program; Ghana was one of the first militaries to receive ACOTA training in early 2003. In addition, there is an active bilateral International Military Education and Training program. Additionally, Ghana is the site of a U.S.-European Command-funded Exercise Reception Facility that was established to facilitate troop deployments for exercises or crisis response within the region. The facility is a direct result of Ghana's partnership with the United States on a Fuel Hub Initiative. Ghana is one of few African nations selected for the State Partnership Program, which will promote greater economic ties with U.S. institutions, including the National Guard.

== Economic and aid relations ==
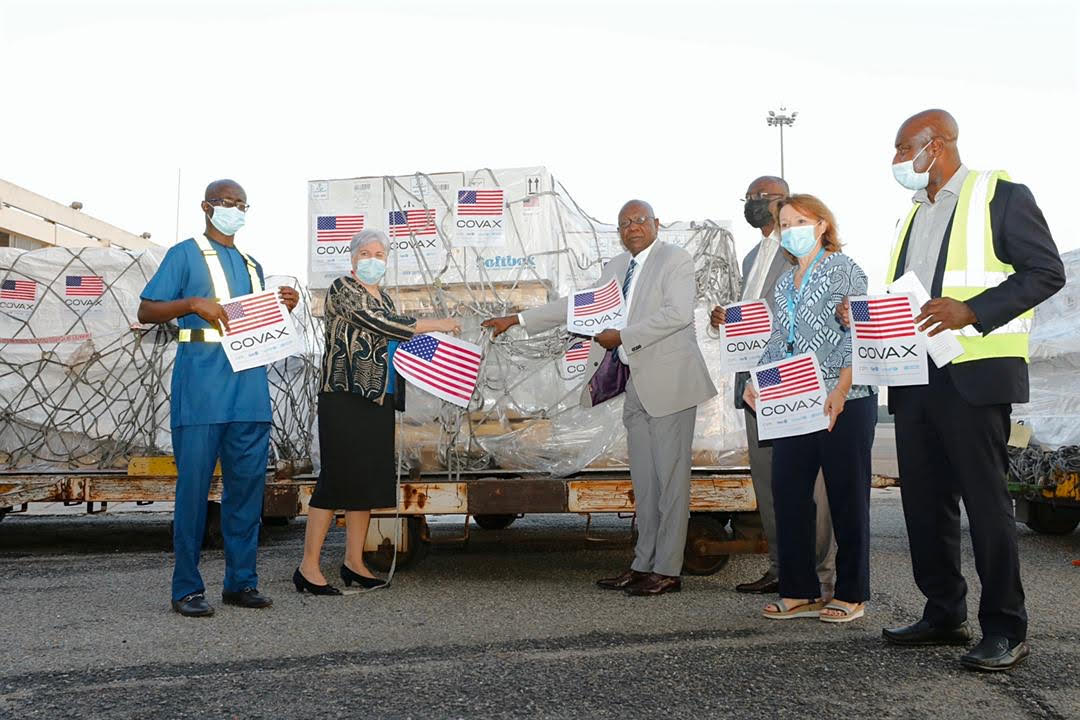
US officials deliver COVID-19 vaccines to Ghana as part of the COVAX program in 2021

Economically, the United States is one of Ghana's most important partners outside Africa. Bilateral trade volume has increased significantly in recent years, reaching a record high of approximately $3.7 billion in 2022. Overall, Ghana had a significant trade surplus of around $1.8 billion with the US in 2022. Ghana mainly exports crude oil, gold, cocoa (beans and products), rubber, fruit, and textiles to the US, while importing mainly machinery, vehicles, electronics, and grain from the US. Ghana benefited from tariff preferences under the US African Growth and Opportunity Act (AGOA), which favors numerous Ghanaian export goods. In addition to trade in goods, investment is also growing: over 100 US companies are active in Ghana – for example in the energy, mining, agricultural processing, information and communication technology, consumer goods, and health sectors. The United States is also extensively involved in development cooperation and support for Ghana.

The United States is among Ghana's principal trading partners. The Office of the President of Ghana worked closely with the U.S. Embassy in Accra to establish an American Chamber of Commerce to continue to develop closer economic ties in the private sector. Major U.S. companies operating in the country include ACS, CMS Energy, Coca-Cola, S.C. Johnson, Ralston Purina, StarKist, A.H. Robins, Sterling, Pfizer, IBM, 3M, Motorola, Stewart & Stevenson, PriceWaterhouseCoopers, and National Cash Register (NCR). Several U.S. firms recently made or are considering investments in Ghana, primarily in gold mining, wood products, and petroleum. U.S. mining giant Newmont entered Ghana's mining sector in 2004 and intends to invest up to $1 billion. In late 1997, Nuevo Petroleum concluded an oil exploration agreement accounting for the last of Ghana's offshore mineral rights zones. Several other U.S. oil companies also are engaged in offshore exploration, but so far with little success.

U.S. development assistance to Ghana in fiscal year 2007 was implemented by USAID, the African Development Foundation, Millennium Challenge Corporation, and others. U.S. development assistance to Ghana in fiscal year 2007 totaled more than $55.1 million, with programs in small farmer competitiveness, health, including HIV/AIDS and maternal child health, education, and democracy/governance. Ghana was the first country in the world to accept Peace Corps volunteers, and the program remains one of the largest. Currently, there are more than 150 volunteers in Ghana. Almost half work in education, and the others in agro-forestry, small business development, health education, water sanitation, and youth development. Ghana's $547 million compact with the Millennium Challenge Corporation is the most recent achievement in the U.S.-Ghanaian development partnership.

In early May 2026, Ghana exited negotiations on a bilateral health assistance agreement with the United States due to concerns about Ghanaian health data being shared with American entities without necessary safeguards and the deal requiring Ghana to bypass parliamentary ratification; conditions that would violate the Ghanaian constitution, the Data Protection Act and Public Health Act.

== Embassies ==
The principal missions relating to the two countries' bilateral relations are the Embassy of the United States, Accra and the Embassy of Ghana, Washington, D.C.

== U.S. Ambassador ==
Principal U.S. officials include:

- Ambassador — Virginia E. Palmer

== See also ==
- Ghanaian Americans
- Foreign relations of Ghana
- Foreign relations of the United States
- African Americans in Ghana
- Door of Return
- Return to roots
- Right of return (Ghana)
- Year of Return, Ghana 2019
