= Myles Frechette =

American diplomat

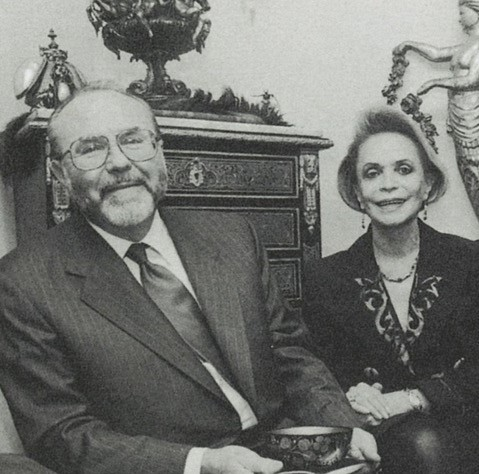
- Frechette with Olga Duque de Ospina in 2019

United States Ambassador to Colombia
- In office 25 July 1994 – 8 November 1997
- President: Bill Clinton
- Preceded by: Morris D. Busby
- Succeeded by: Curtis W. Kamman

United States Ambassador to Cameroon
- In office 8 September 1983 – 30 July 1987
- President: Ronald Reagan
- Preceded by: Hume A. Horan
- Succeeded by: Mark L. Edelman

Personal details
- Born: 25 April 1936 Santiago, Chile
- Died: 1 July 2017 (aged 81) Rockville, Maryland
- Spouse: Barbara Ann Frechette
- Children: 2

Myles Robert Rene Frechette (25 April 1936 – 1 July 2017) was U.S. Ambassador to Cameroon (1983-1987) and Colombia (1994-1997). A career diplomat, he joined the US Foreign Service in 1963; other positions include assistant U.S. trade representative for Latin America, the Caribbean, and Africa from 1990 to 1993. He was also Senior Associate with the Center for Strategic and International Studies.

Diplomatic posts
Preceded by Hume A. Horan	United States Ambassador to Cameroon; 1983–1987	Succeeded by Mark L. Edelman
Preceded by Morris D. Busby	United States Ambassador to Colombia; 1994–1997	Succeeded by Curtis W. Kamman
