= Morris D. Busby =

American career diplomat

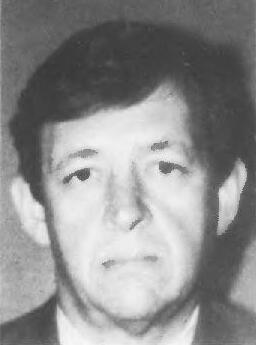

United States Ambassador to Colombia
- In office September 18, 1991 – July 5, 1994
- President: George H. W. Bush; Bill Clinton
- Preceded by: Thomas E. McNamara
- Succeeded by: Myles Frechette

7th Coordinator for Counterterrorism
- In office May 1, 1989 – July 24, 1991
- Preceded by: L. Paul Bremer
- Succeeded by: Peter Burleigh

Personal details
- Born: March 15, 1938 (age 88) Memphis, Tennessee, U.S.
- Education: Marshall University; George Washington University

Morris Dempson Busby (born March 15, 1938) is an American career diplomat who served as United States Ambassador to Colombia from 1991 to 1994, during which Pablo Escobar was killed.

== Career ==
Before being appointed as the United States Ambassador to Colombia, Busby served as coordinator for counter-terrorism with the rank of Ambassador at the Department of State in Washington, D.C. Prior to this, he served at the Department of State as a special envoy for Central America, 1988–1989; Principal Deputy Assistant Secretary of State for Inter-American Affairs, 1987–1988; and Director of the Nicaraguan Coordination Office, 1987.

Busby served as deputy chief of mission at the United States Embassy in Mexico City, 1984–1987; and as an Alternate United States Representative to the Committee on Disarmament at the United States mission in Geneva, Switzerland, 1981–1984.

On May 15, 1991 President George H. W. Bush nominated Busby to be United States Ambassador to Colombia. On July 30, 1991, the U.S. Senate made the confirmation.

During his tenure, on December 2, 1993 the leader of the Medellín Cartel, Pablo Escobar was shot dead by Colombian National Police. After Escobar's death, Busby announced on national television: "Pablo Escobar's death and the dismantling of the Medellin cartel are great successes for Colombia. But now they should continue with the Cali Cartel.".

After being Ambassador, in 1995 he has served as President of BGI, Inc., an international consulting firm. Busby became Director of Morpho Detection, Inc. since March 1998.

Diplomatic posts
Preceded by Thomas E. McNamara	United States Ambassador to Colombia; 1991 – 1994	Succeeded by Myles Frechette
Preceded by Paul Bremer	Coordinator for Counterterrorism; 1989 – 1991	Succeeded by Peter Burleigh
