= Katie Robinson (disambiguation) =

Katie Robinson is an English footballer.

Katie Robinson may also refer to:

- Katie Robinson, swimmer in S12 (classification)
- Katie Robinson, candidate in British Columbia municipal elections, 2011
- Katie Robinson, presenter on ITV News Channel TV

== See also ==
- Kate Robinson (disambiguation)
- Katherine Robinson (disambiguation)
