= Kathryn Robinson =

Kathryn Robinson may refer to:

- Kathryn Robinson (equestrian) (born 1985), Canadian eventing athlete
- Kathryn Robinson (journalist) (born 1975), Australian television presenter and journalist
- Kathryn Dee Robinson, American ambassador to Ghana
