= Wilson C. Flake =

American diplomat

Wilson Clark Flake

1st United States Ambassador to Ghana
- In office June 19, 1957 – November 21, 1960
- President: Dwight D. Eisenhower
- Preceded by: Position established
- Succeeded by: Francis H. Russell

Personal details
- Born: February 28, 1906; Norfolk, Virginia
- Died: February 15, 1977 (aged 70); Bethesda, Maryland

Wilson C. Flake (February 28, 1906 – February 15, 1977) was an American diplomat who served as the United States Ambassador to Ghana from 1957 to 1960.

He died on February 15, 1977, in Bethesda, Maryland at age 70.
