= List of ambassadors of the United States to India =

Ambassador of the United States of America to the Republic of India
- Seal of the United States Department of State

- Flag of a United States ambassador

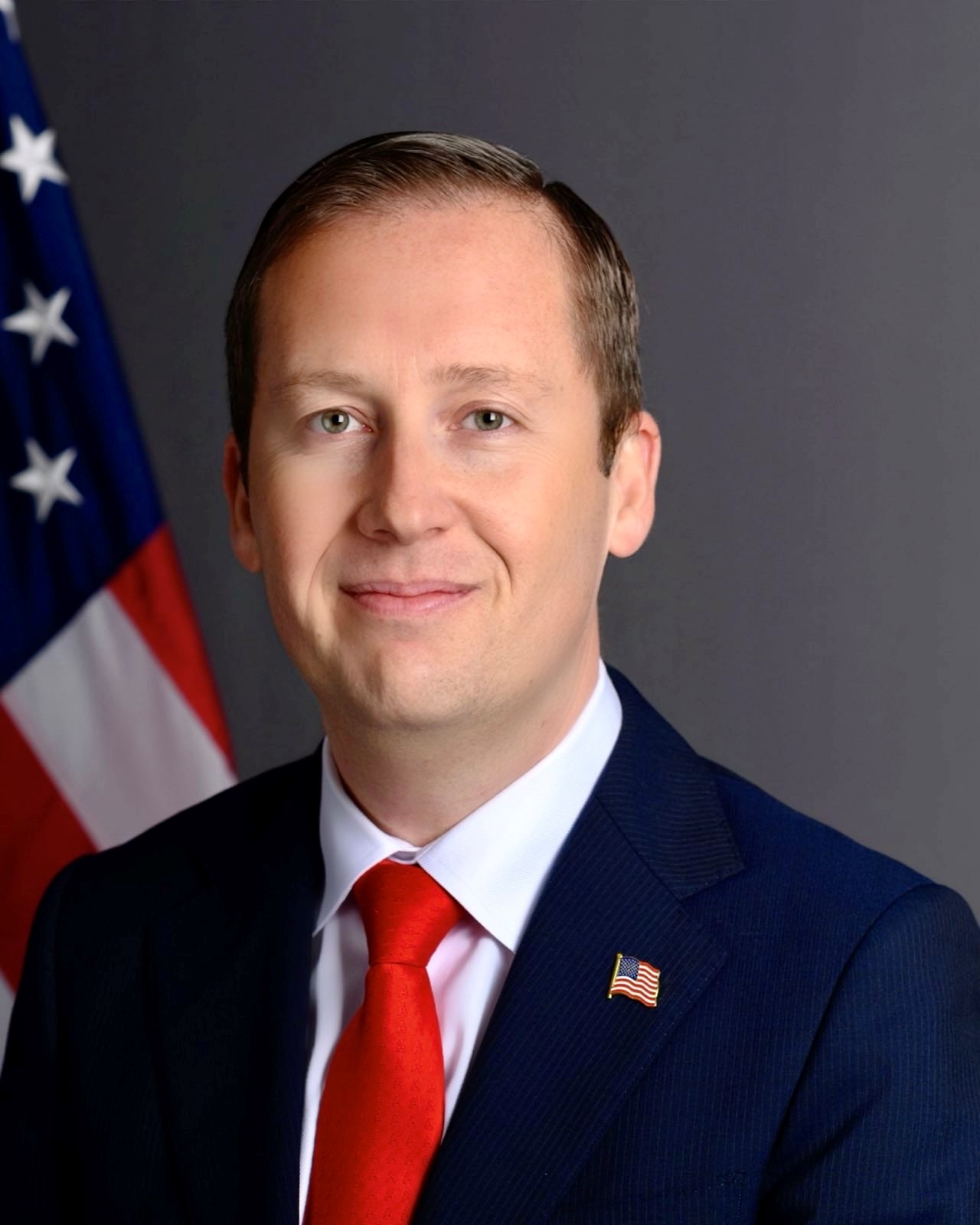
- Incumbent; Sergio Gor since January 14, 2026
- Department of State
- Appointer: The president with the advice and consent of the Senate
- Inaugural holder: George R. Merrell (as Chargé d'affaires ad interim)
- Formation: November 1, 1946
- Website: in.usembassy.gov

The United States of America ambassador to the Republic of India is the chief diplomatic representative of United States in India. The U.S. ambassador's office is situated at the U.S. Embassy in New Delhi.

On October 7, 2025, Sergio Gor was confirmed as ambassador by the Senate.

== Chiefs of mission to India ==
=== U.S. ambassadors to the Dominion of India (1947–1950) ===
President George Washington, on November 19, 1792, nominated Benjamin Joy of Newbury Port as the first American Consul to Calcutta (present-day Kolkata) and later commissioned Joy to that office on November 21, 1792.

| Name | Status | Title | Appointment | Credentials presented | Termination of mission | Notes |
|---|---|---|---|---|---|---|
| Henry F. Grady | Non-career appointee | Ambassador Extraordinary and Plenipotentiary | April 10, 1947 | July 1, 1947 | Left post, June 22, 1948 | Accredited also to Nepal; resident at New Delhi. |
| Loy W. Henderson | Foreign Service officer | Ambassador Extraordinary and Plenipotentiary | July 14, 1948 | November 19, 1948 | Re-accredited when India became a republic; presented new credentials February 24, 1950 | Commissioned during a recess of the Senate; recommissioned after confirmation on March 2, 1949. Also accredited to Nepal; resident at New Delhi. |

=== U.S. ambassadors to the Republic of India (1950–present) ===
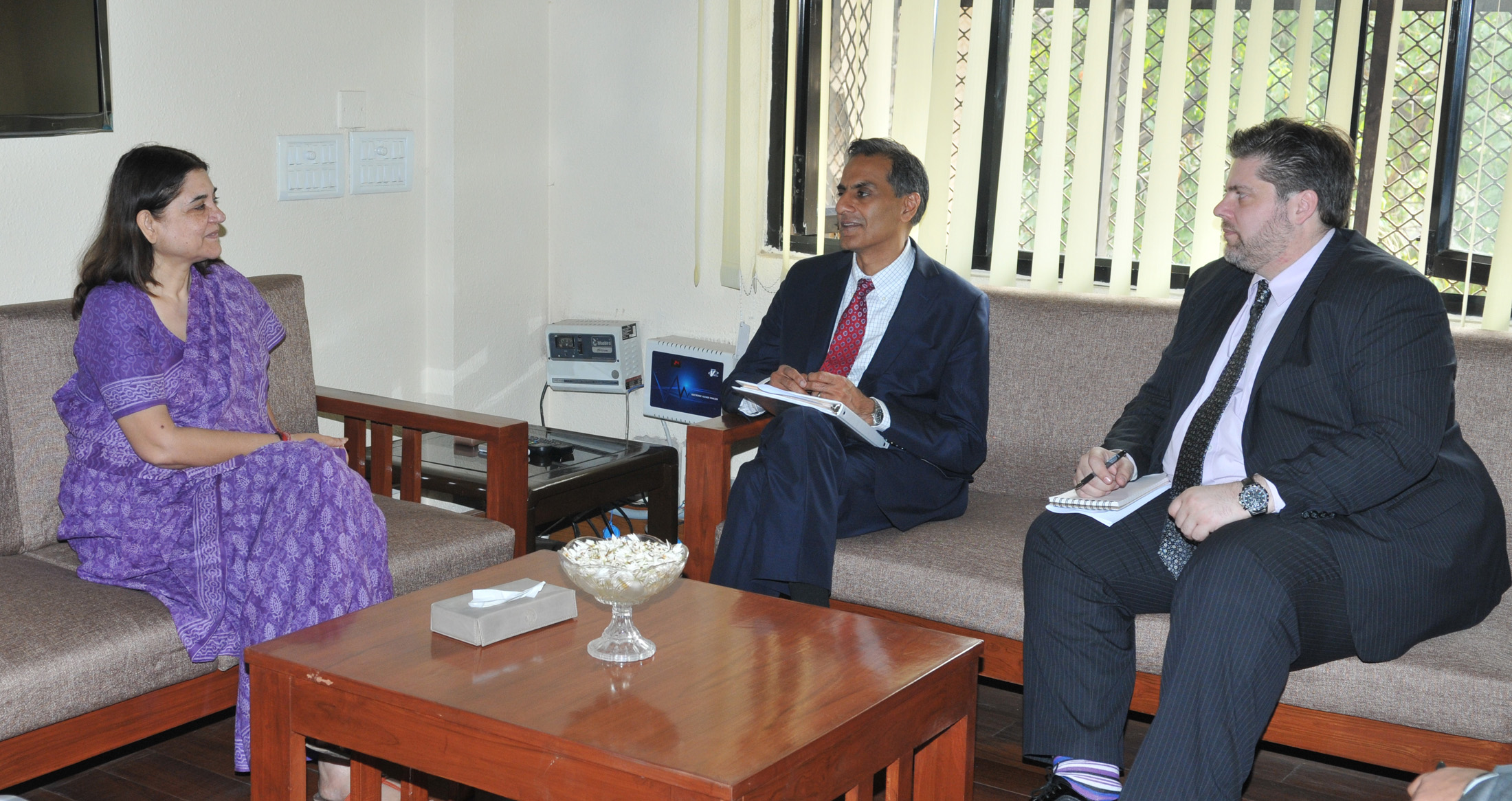
Ambassador Richard Verma meeting with Maneka Gandhi in 2015

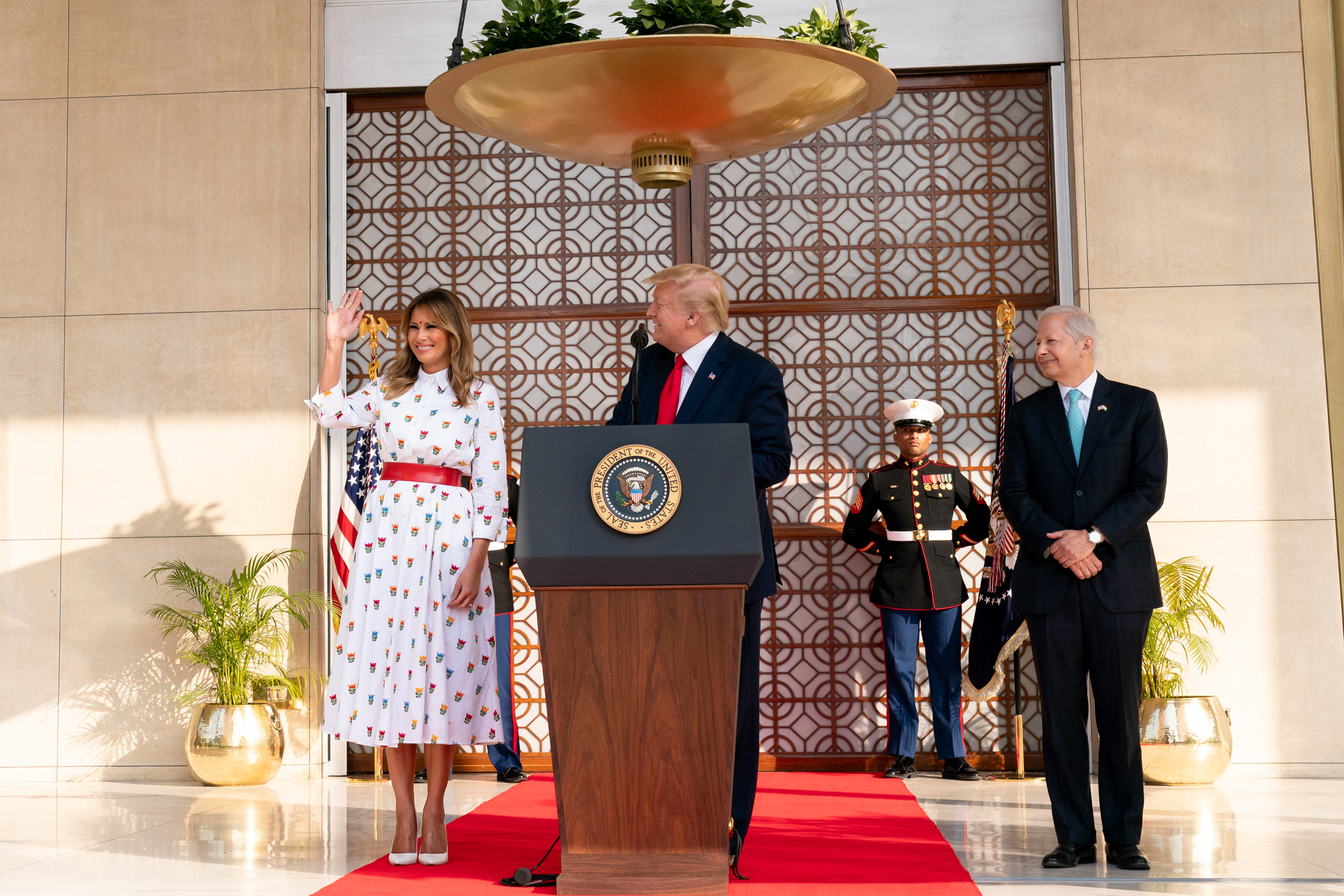
President Donald Trump and First Lady Melania Trump with Ambassador Kenneth Juster at the U.S. Embassy in New Delhi in 2018

| Name | Status | Title | Appointment | Credentials presented | Termination of mission | Notes |
|---|---|---|---|---|---|---|
| Loy W. Henderson | Foreign Service officer | Ambassador Extraordinary and Plenipotentiary | | February 24, 1950 | September 21, 1951 | Reaccredited when India became a republic; presented new credentials Feb 24, 1950; left post Sep 21, 1951; commissioned during a recess of the Senate; recommissioned after confirmation on Mar 2, 1949. Also accredited to Nepal; resident at New Delhi. |
| Chester Bowles | Non-career appointee | Ambassador Extraordinary and Plenipotentiary | October 10, 1951 | November 1, 1951 | Left post, Mar 23, 1953 | Also accredited to Nepal; resident at New Delhi. |
| George V. Allen | Foreign Service officer | Ambassador Extraordinary and Plenipotentiary | March 11, 1953 | May 4, 1953 | Left post, November 30, 1954 | Also accredited to Nepal; resident at New Delhi. |
| John Sherman Cooper | Non-career appointee | Ambassador Extraordinary and Plenipotentiary | February 4, 1955 | April 9, 1955 | Left post, April 23, 1956 | Also accredited to Nepal; resident at New Delhi. |
| Ellsworth Bunker | Non-career appointee | Ambassador Extraordinary and Plenipotentiary | November 28, 1956 | March 4, 1957 | Left India, March 23, 1961 | Also accredited to Nepal; resident at New Delhi. Commissioned during a recess of the Senate; recommissioned after confirmation on January 25, 1957. |
| John Kenneth Galbraith | Non-career appointee | Ambassador Extraordinary and Plenipotentiary | March 29, 1961 | April 18, 1961 | Left post, Jul 12, 1963 | |
| Chester Bowles | Non-career appointee | Ambassador Extraordinary and Plenipotentiary | May 3, 1963 | July 19, 1963 | Left post, April 21, 1969 | |
| Kenneth B. Keating | Non-career appointee | Ambassador Extraordinary and Plenipotentiary | May 1, 1969 | July 2, 1969 | Left post, July 26, 1972 | |
| Daniel P. Moynihan | Non-career appointee | Ambassador Extraordinary and Plenipotentiary | February 8, 1973 | February 28, 1973 | Left post, January 7, 1975 | |
| William B. Saxbe | Non-career appointee | Ambassador Extraordinary and Plenipotentiary | February 3, 1975 | March 8, 1975 | Left post, November 20, 1976 | |
| Robert F. Goheen | Non-career appointee | Ambassador Extraordinary and Plenipotentiary | April 26, 1977 | May 26, 1977 | Left post, December 10, 1980 | |
| Harry G. Barnes Jr. | Foreign Service officer | Ambassador Extraordinary and Plenipotentiary | October 1, 1981 | November 17, 1981 | Left post, June 27, 1985 | |
| John Gunther Dean | Foreign Service officer | Ambassador Extraordinary and Plenipotentiary | August 2, 1985 | September 6, 1985 | Left post November 7, 1988 | |
| John R. Hubbard | Non-career appointee | Ambassador Extraordinary and Plenipotentiary | November 22, 1988 | December 27, 1988 | Left post November 15, 1989 | Commissioned during a recess of the Senate. |
| William Clark Jr. | Foreign Service officer | Ambassador Extraordinary and Plenipotentiary | October 10, 1989 | December 22, 1989 | Left post, July 2, 1992 | |
| Thomas R. Pickering | Foreign Service officer | Ambassador Extraordinary and Plenipotentiary | April 6, 1992 | August 14, 1992 | Left post, March 23, 1993 | Kenneth Brill served as Chargé d'affaires ad interim, March 1993 – August 1994. |
| Frank G. Wisner | Foreign Service officer | Ambassador Extraordinary and Plenipotentiary | June 9, 1994 | August 2, 1994 | Left post, July 12, 1997 | |
| Richard Frank Celeste | Non-career appointee | Ambassador Extraordinary and Plenipotentiary | November 10, 1997 | November 28, 1997 | Left post April 25, 2001 | |
| Robert Blackwill | Non-career appointee | Ambassador Extraordinary and Plenipotentiary | July 12, 2001 | September 14, 2001 | Left post July 31, 2003 | |
| David Campbell Mulford | Non-career officer | Ambassador Extraordinary and Plenipotentiary | December 12, 2003 | February 23, 2004 | Left post January 15, 2009 | |
| Peter Burleigh | Foreign Service officer | Chargé d'affaires | January 15, 2009 | | August 11, 2009 | |
| Tim Roemer | Non-career appointee | Ambassador Extraordinary and Plenipotentiary | July 23, 2009 | August 11, 2009 | Left post June 30, 2011 | |
| Peter Burleigh | Foreign Service officer | Chargé d'affaires | July 1, 2011 | | April 19, 2012 | |
| Nancy Jo Powell | Foreign Service officer | Ambassador Extraordinary and Plenipotentiary | February 7, 2012 | April 19, 2012 | May 21, 2014 | |
| Kathleen Stephens | Foreign Service officer (interim) | Chargé d'affaires | May 22, 2014 | June 6, 2014 | January 16, 2015 | Assumed position after resignation of Nancy Jo Powell. |
| Richard Verma | Non-career appointee | Ambassador Extraordinary and Plenipotentiary | December 12, 2014 | January 16, 2015 | January 20, 2017 | First U.S. Ambassador to India of Indian origin. |
| MaryKay Carlson | Foreign Service officer (interim) | Chargé d'affaires | January 20, 2017 | | November 15, 2017 | Assumed office after Ambassador Richard Verma demitted office following President Trump's inauguration on January 20. |
| Kenneth Juster | Non-career appointee | Ambassador Extraordinary and Plenipotentiary | November 3, 2017 | November 23, 2017 | January 20, 2021 | |
| Donald Heflin | Foreign Service officer (interim) | Chargé d'affaires | January 20, 2021 | | April 30, 2021 | Minister-Counselor for Consular Affairs. (Note: Deputy chief of mission Edgard Kagan was appointed Senior Director for East Asia and Oceania at the U.S. National Seucity Council in January 2021.) |
| Daniel Bennett Smith | Foreign Service officer (interim) | Chargé d'affaires | April 30, 2021 | | June 29, 2021 | |
| Atul Keshap | Foreign Service officer (interim) | Chargé d'affaires | June 29, 2021 | | September 9, 2021 | |
| Patricia A. Lacina | Foreign Service officer (interim) | Chargé d'affaires | September 9, 2021 | | October 24, 2022 | |
| A. Elizabeth Jones | Foreign Service officer (interim) | Chargé d'affaires | October 24, 2022 | | April 11, 2023 | |
| Eric Garcetti | Non-career appointee | Ambassador Extraordinary and Plenipotentiary | March 15, 2023 | May 11, 2023 | January 20, 2025 | In July 2021, Joe Biden nominated Garcetti. When the nomination expired in 2023, Biden once again nominated Garcetti. |
| Jorgan K. Andrews | Foreign Service officer (interim) | Chargé d'affaires | January 20, 2025 | | October 11, 2025 | |
| Sergio Gor | Non-career appointee | Ambassador Extraordinary and Plenipotentiary | October 7, 2025 | January 14, 2026 | Incumbent | |

== Sources ==
- Brands, H. W. Inside the Cold War: Loy Henderson and the Rise of the American Empire 1918-1961 (1991) pp 196–230; Loy Henderson was US Ambassador, 1948–51

=== Primary sources ===
- Bowles, Chester (1969). A View from New Delhi: Selected Speeches and Writings, 1963-1969. Yale U.P. ISBN 0300105460., US ambassador 1951-53 and 1963–69
- Galbraith, John K. Ambassador's journal: a personal account of the Kennedy years (1969) online, he was US ambassador to India 1961-63
- U.S. Department of State. Foreign Relations of the United States (FRUS), many volumes of primary sources; the complete texts of these large books are all online. See Guide to FRUS. For example, Foreign Relations of the United States, 1969–1976, Volume XI, South Asia Crisis, 1971 was published in 2005 and is online here. The most recent volumes are Foreign Relations of the United States, 1969–1976, Volume E–7, Documents on South Asia, 1969–1972 (2005) online here and Foreign Relations of the United States, 1969–1976, Volume E–8, Documents on South Asia, 1973–1976 (2007) online here. Included are the most important cables sent by the ambassador to Washington.

== See also ==
- Embassy of India, Washington, D.C.
- India–United States relations
- List of ambassadors of India to the United States
- Foreign relations of India
- Ambassadors of the United States
