= Kate Robinson =

Kate Robinson may refer to:

- Kate Robinson (figure skater) (born 1978), American ice dancer
- Kate Robinson (rower) (born 1977), New Zealand rower
- Kate Robinson (sculptor), British sculptor
- Kate Hudson (born 1979), American actress, née Kate Robinson

== See also ==
- Katie Robinson (disambiguation)
- Katherine Robinson (disambiguation)
