= Peter Burleigh =

American diplomat (born 1942)

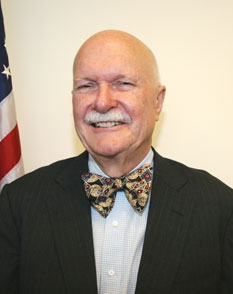
- Official portrait, 2009

United States Ambassador to India
- Acting
- In office July 1, 2011 – April 24, 2012
- President: Barack Obama
- Preceded by: Tim Roemer
- Succeeded by: Nancy Jo Powell
- In office January 15, 2009 – August 11, 2009
- President: Barack Obama
- Preceded by: David Mulford
- Succeeded by: Tim Roemer

United States Ambassador to the United Nations Acting
- In office August 18, 1998 – September 7, 1999
- President: Bill Clinton
- Preceded by: Bill Richardson
- Succeeded by: Richard Holbrooke

United States Ambassador to Sri Lanka and the Maldives
- In office January 19, 1996 – August 1, 1997
- President: Bill Clinton
- Preceded by: Teresita Schaffer
- Succeeded by: Shaun Donnelly

8th Coordinator for Counterterrorism
- In office November 22, 1991 – November 23, 1992
- President: George H. W. Bush
- Preceded by: Morris D. Busby
- Succeeded by: Philip C. Wilcox Jr.

Personal details
- Born: March 7, 1942 (age 84) Los Angeles, California, U.S.
- Education: Colgate University (BA)

Albert Peter Burleigh (born March 7, 1942) is an American diplomat who worked as a Foreign Service Officer and joined the American Academy of Diplomacy.

== Early life and education ==
Burleigh was born on March 7, 1942, in Los Angeles, California. He graduated from Hollywood High School and then Colgate University, where he received a Bachelor of Arts in 1963.

== Career ==
Burleigh was a Peace Corps volunteer in Nepal from 1963 to 1965, during which time he mastered the Nepali language. In addition to Nepali, he speaks Bengali, Hindi, and Sinhalese.

He served as U.S. ambassador to Sri Lanka from 1995 to 1997, serving concurrently as ambassador to the Maldives. In 1998–99, he was chargé d'affaires of the U.S. Mission to the United Nations. In 1999, President Clinton nominated Burleigh for the post of ambassador to the Philippines and Palau, but the U.S. Senate never acted upon the nomination, and it was eventually withdrawn. In 2009 and again in 2011, he was appointed chargé d'affaires of the U.S. Embassy in New Delhi, pending appointments first of Timothy Roemer and of Nancy Jo Powell as ambassador.

He is a visiting professor of international affairs at the University of Miami.

Government offices
Preceded by Morris D. Busby	Coordinator for Counterterrorism; 1991–1992	Succeeded by Thomas E. McNamara; Acting
Diplomatic posts
Preceded by Teresita Schaffer	United States Ambassador to Sri Lanka and the Maldives; 1996–1997	Succeeded by Shaun Donnelly
Preceded by Bill Richardson	United States Ambassador to the United Nations; Acting; 1998–1999	Succeeded by Richard Holbrooke
Preceded by David Mulford	United States Ambassador to India; Acting; 2009	Succeeded by Tim Roemer
Preceded by Tim Roemer	United States Ambassador to India; Acting; 2011–2012	Succeeded by Nancy Jo Powell
