= Embassy of the United States, Accra =

Diplomatic mission of the United States in Ghana

- Location: Cantonments, Accra, Ghana
- Address: No. 24, Fourth Circular Rd.
- Website: gh.usembassy.gov

The Embassy of the United States of America in Accra is the diplomatic mission of the United States in Ghana. It is the focal point for events relating to the United States held in Ghana.

== Leadership ==
Ambassador is in charge of the Embassy. Virginia E. Palmer is the current Ambassador of the United States to Ghana.

== History ==
The embassy in Accra was established March 6, 1957, with Donald W. Lamm in charge as chargé d'affaires.

The initial embassy building was designed by Harry Weese. Described as a "glass box raised on stilts and wrapped in wooden shutters", Weese claimed to have been inspired by "towering African anthills and[...]an inverted cheiftain's hut", comments which were later criticized as reductive and possibly a false stretch to portray the building as grounded in local tradition.

On August 28, 1963, in response to the concurrent March on Washington and the death of W. E. B. Du Bois the day before, a protest was held at the embassy by African American expats, including notable activists such as Julian Mayfield and Maya Angelou, as well as native Ghanaians challenging the John F. Kennedy administration for its contradictory and slow-moving racial equality policies. Although there were other solidarity demonstrations at embassies in different countries as well, the Accra protest was the most prominent.

In 1998, the embassy moved to a temporary building due to security concerns, with the building later being used by the Ghanaian Ministry of Women and Children's Affairs. A new embassy compound that adheres to the Standard Embassy Design guidelines, implemented after 9/11 to increase the security of diplomatic missions, was completed in 2007 by Skidmore, Owings & Merrill. The former building was slated to become a women's center, but reportedly became vacant and dilapidated.

A "fake embassy" was reportedly active for around ten years until its shutdown in 2016, posing as the actual American embassy (and possibly the Dutch embassy) and issuing false visas for thousands of dollars, with its closure gaining worldwide attention; however, an investigation by The Guardian found the reports to be exaggerated, stating that it was based on faulty intelligence from investigations into actual visa fraud schemes and that certain claims, such as the use of an American flag and portraits of US presidents at the premises, were not true.

President Joe Biden nominated career US diplomat and Acting Assistant Secretary/Principal Deputy Assistant Secretary of the Bureau of Energy Resources Virginia E. Palmer for the position on June 2, 2021; she has yet to be confirmed by the Senate.

== See also ==
- Ghana–United States relations
- List of ambassadors of the United States to Ghana
- Embassy of Ghana, Washington, D.C.
