= Mary Carlin Yates =

American diplomat (born 1946)

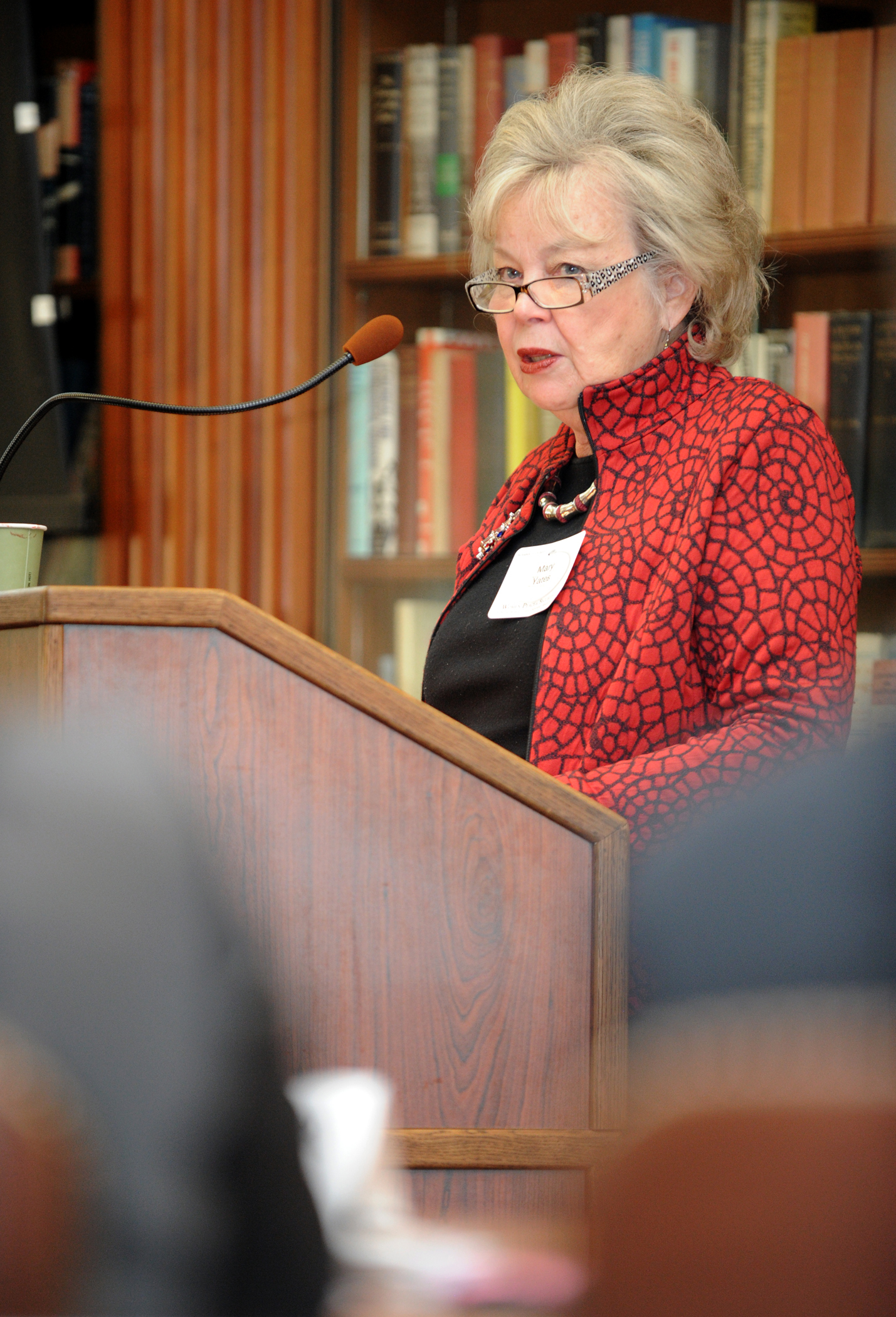
Mary Carlin Yates in 2013

Mary Carlin Yates (born 1946, Portland, Oregon) was a Foreign Service Officer at the U.S. State Department and was one of two deputy commanders of the United States Africa Command until June 2009.

Yates retired in September 2011 after 31 years. Her two final assignments were as Special Assistant to the President and Senior Director for African Affairs at the National Security Council (NSC) of the White House from January 2011- August 2011 and as the Senior Advisor for Strategic Planning and Special Assistant to the President from June 2009 – December 2010. Despite her retirement, she served as Chargé d'Affaires in Khartoum, Sudan through February 2012.

Yates earned her BA in English from Oregon State University and earned a Master's in Comparative East West Humanities from New York University, where she pursued her doctoral studies in Asian Affairs.

She served as U.S. Ambassador to the Republic of Burundi from 1999 until June 2002, and as U.S. Ambassador to the Republic of Ghana from November 2002 to 2005.

Yates was named on September 28, 2008, as the Deputy to the Commander for Civil-Military Activities, United States Africa Command (USAFRICOM), headquartered in Stuttgart, Germany where she served most recently as the Principal Advisor to the Commander, United States European Command (USEUCOM). She has earned two State Department Superior Honor Awards and two Meritorious Honor Awards.

Her husband, John M. Yates, was U.S. Special Envoy to Somalia.

She currently sits on the Board of Directors of the Atlantic Council.

Diplomatic posts
Preceded by Morris N. Hughes, Jr.	United States Ambassador to Burundi; 1999–2002	Succeeded by James Howard Yellin
Preceded by Kenneth Lee Brown	United States Ambassador to Ghana; 2003–2005	Succeeded by Kathryn Dee Robinson
