= Colorado Department of Education =

State department in Colorado, United States

Department of Education

Department overview
- Jurisdiction: Colorado
- Headquarters: Denver
- Department executive: Susana Córdova, Commissioner of Education
- Website: www.cde.state.co.us

The Colorado Department of Education (CDE) is the principal department of the Colorado state government that is responsible for education. It is headquartered in Denver. Members of the Colorado State Board of Education are charged by the Colorado Constitution with the general supervision of the public schools. They have numerous powers and duties specified in state law. Individuals are elected on a partisan basis to serve six-year terms without pay.

== See also ==
- Colorado State Board of Education
- Colorado Department of Higher Education
- Teacher Institute at La Academia
