= E. Michael Southwick =

American diplomat

Elmer Michael Southwick (born January 12, 1945 Willits, California) was the American Ambassador to Uganda from 1994 until 1997.

== Early life ==
Southwick was born in California and raised there and in Idaho. He graduated from Stanford University and entered the Foreign Service in 1967.

== Career ==
Southwick served as Deputy Chief of Mission in Kenya under political appointee Ambassador Smith Hempstone from 1990 until 1994.

In 2001, Southwick led the US delegation to the World Conference Against Racism in Durban. Southwick was retired in 2004 and gives seminars at the US Institute of Peace (USIP).

== See also ==
- Entry in German Wikipedia
