= James Howard Yellin =

American diplomat

United States ambassador to Burundi
- In office September 26, 2002 – July 21, 2005

Personal details
- Born: 1938 (age 86–87)

James Howard Yellin (born 1938) is an American diplomat who served as the United States ambassador to Burundi between September 26, 2002, and July 21, 2005.
