= Tim Roemer =

American politician (born 1956)

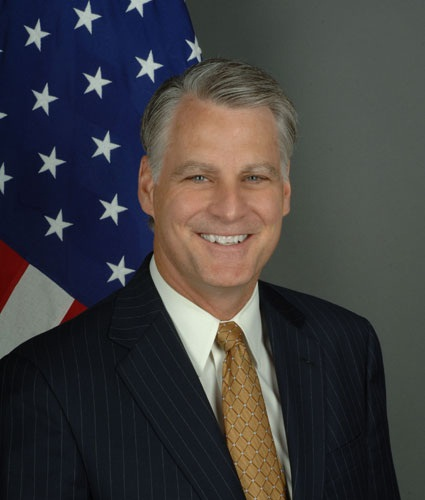

United States Ambassador to India
- In office August 11, 2009 – July 1, 2011
- President: Barack Obama
- Preceded by: Peter Burleigh (acting)
- Succeeded by: Peter Burleigh (acting)

Chair of the New Democrat Coalition
- In office January 3, 1997 – January 3, 2001 Serving with Cal Dooley, Jim Moran
- Preceded by: Position established
- Succeeded by: Jim Davis; Ron Kind; Adam Smith

Member of the U.S. House of Representatives from Indiana's 3rd district
- In office January 3, 1991 – January 3, 2003
- Preceded by: John Hiler
- Succeeded by: Chris Chocola (redistricted)

Personal details
- Born: Timothy John Roemer; October 30, 1956 (age 69) South Bend, Indiana, U.S.
- Party: Democratic
- Spouse: Sally Johnston (m. 1989)
- Relations: J. Bennett Johnston (father-in-law)
- Children: 4
- Education: University of California, San Diego (BA); University of Notre Dame (MA, PhD)

Timothy John Roemer (born October 30, 1956) is an American diplomat and politician from Indiana who, as a member of the Democratic Party, served in the United States House of Representatives from 1991 to 2003 in Indiana's 3rd congressional district. Subsequently, he was later the president of the Center for National Policy (CNP), a Washington, D.C.–based national security think tank. He served as United States Ambassador to India from 2009 to 2011. Roemer later served on the advisory board of Washington, D.C.–based non-profit America Abroad Media.

== Early life and education ==
Tim Roemer was born in 1956 in South Bend, Indiana. His grandfather, William F. Roemer, was a philosophy professor at the University of Notre Dame; and his grandmother was an elementary school teacher. Roemer's parents, James and Mary Ann Roemer, also worked at Notre Dame as dean of students and coordinator of volunteer activities, respectively. His uncle, William F. Roemer Jr., was an agent for the Federal Bureau of Investigation who battled organized crime. Roemer graduated from Penn High School in 1975 and worked at various jobs from the age of 14 to help pay for college.

Tim Roemer graduated from the University of California, San Diego with a B.A. degree in 1979. He earned his Master of Arts and Doctor of Philosophy degrees from the University of Notre Dame; his 1985 dissertation was titled The Senior Executive Service: Retirement and Public Personnel Policy.

== Political career ==
Tim Roemer entered politics by serving on the staff of United States Houses of Representatives member John Brademas of Indiana (1978–1979) while still in college. After completing his doctorate, he served on the staff of United States Senate member Dennis DeConcini of Arizona (1985–1989).

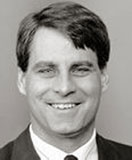
Roemer as a Congressman

In 1990, Roemer ran and won as a Democrat in 1990 to represent Indiana's 3rd congressional district, his boss' former district, serving six terms in Congress from 1991 to 2003. While in the House, Roemer served on the United States congressional committees of the United States House Permanent Select Committee on Intelligence, the United States House Committee on Education and Workforce, and the United States House Committee on Science, Space, and Technology. He did not run for reelection in 2002.

Tim Roemer voted in favor of the General Agreement on Tariffs and Trade (GATT), the African Growth and Opportunity Act, and the Caribbean Basin Initiative. He opposed the North American Free Trade Agreement (NAFTA), feeling it provided incentives for businesses to move out of the country (as may have happened in his district). Roemer voted against presidential fast-track trade promotion authority, believing that the United States should have been stricter in its enforcement of existing agreements.

Much of Roemer's efforts during his congressional career were related to improving Education in the United States. He was the principal author of the Ed-Flex bill, which encouraged states to seek innovative approaches to education. Roemer was the chief sponsor of the "Transition to Teaching" bill that helped address teacher shortages by recruiting and training professionals to become teachers. Roemer was also the lead sponsor of the five-year reauthorization of Higher Education Act of 1965, which reduced rates of interest on student loans, increased Pell Grants, increased funding for teacher training, and expanded aid to families.

Tim Roemer was a principal sponsor of the AmeriCorps national service program, and a co-author of a bill to expand Head Start services to provide childcare coverage for women moving from welfare to work. He co-wrote legislation on reauthorizing the Individuals with Disabilities Education Act and wrote an amendment to tax relief legislation for teacher certification of professionals in outside fields. He co-authored "School-to-Work" legislation to help non-college-bound high school students learn skills to prepare them for the workforce.

In his final term in Congress, Roemer was instrumental in passing the No Child Left Behind Act and pushed for full funding for the program.

Roemer was one of the first members of Congress to call for a Cabinet-level federal executive department to oversee national security, and was an original sponsor of the legislation to create the United States Department of Homeland Security. Eventually he opposed the revisions proposed by the Bush administration, because of concerns about bureaucratic inefficiencies, and voted against the creation of DHS. Roemer advocated a "civilian reserve corps" to train more fluent speakers in foreign languages for the United States Intelligence Community. Roemer was an original sponsor of bioterrorism legislation and legislation aimed at creating the 9/11 Commission, upon which he later served.

== Post-electoral career ==
Roemer addressing the audience at CNP's 2007 Edmund S. Muskie Distinguished Service Award Dinner

Tim Roemer was appointed as a member of the 9/11 Commission to investigate the terrorist attacks on the US. He was a candidate for chair of the Democratic National Committee (gaining the support of Democratic leaders Nancy Pelosi and Harry Reid). He lost to Howard Dean, who had unsuccessfully sought the 2004 Democratic presidential nomination.

Roemer was criticized as too conservative for the post, due to his anti-abortion stance and his oft-mentioned vote in 1993 against the President Bill Clinton economic plan. Roemer is a moderate Democrat, voting more liberally on some foreign policy issues and conservatively on social issues.

Roemer endorsed Barack Obama in the 2008 Democratic presidential primaries and campaigned vigorously for him, particularly in his home state of Indiana, where he joined former U.S. House of Representatives member Lee Hamilton in support of Obama. Roemer's moderate, bipartisan politics, and national security experience led to speculation (from Chris Cillizza and Ben Smith) that Roemer was considered a possible vice presidential running mate for Obama.

Roemer served as a distinguished scholar at the Mercatus Center at George Mason University. He became a partner at Johnston and Associates, a public and legislative affairs consultancy. He was later selected as the president of the Center for National Policy. After leaving his post as U.S. Ambassador to India in 2011, he became a senior executive at the Washington, D.C.–based public affairs firm APCO Worldwide.

Roemer served on the Commission on the Prevention of Weapons of Mass Destruction Proliferation and Terrorism, a bipartisan commission created by Congress in 2007. This was one of the reforms recommended by the 9/11 Commission to examine how the United States can best address this threat to national security.

In addition, Roemer served on the Washington Institute for Near East Policy's Presidential Task force on Combating the Ideology of Radical Extremism, and the National Parks Second Century Commission.

== Diplomatic career ==
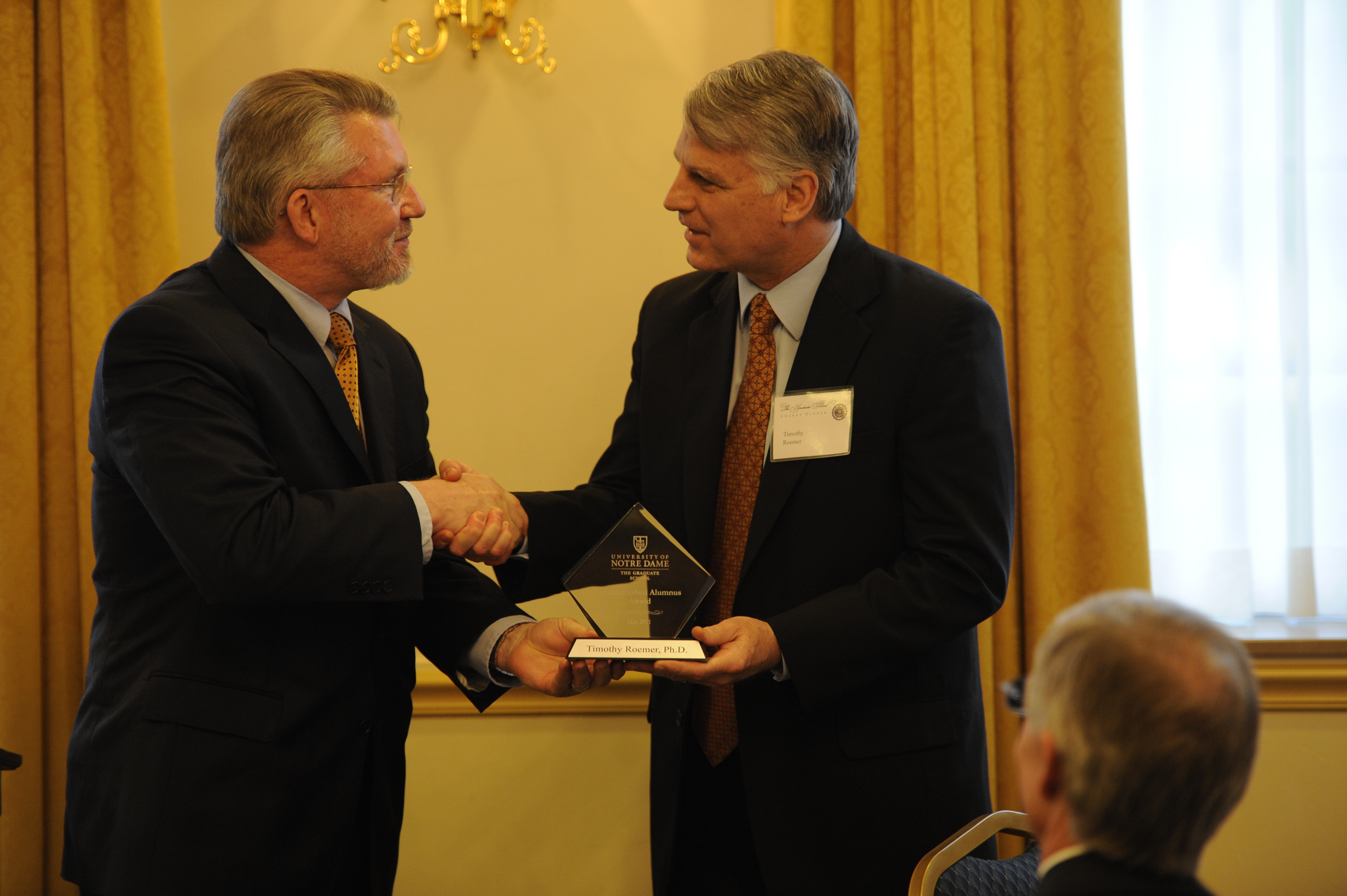
Roemer receiving the Distinguished Alumnus Award from the University of Notre Dame after delivering the commencement address for the university's graduate school

Roemer was nominated by President Barack Obama as the 21st U.S. Ambassador to the Republic of India on May 27, 2009. His nomination was confirmed by the U.S. Senate on July 10, 2009, he was sworn in on July 23, 2009, in the State Department's ceremonial Benjamin Franklin Treaty Room and he presented his credentials to President of India Pratibha Patil on August 11, 2009.

During his tenure as Ambassador, several policies and initiatives were announced. President Obama stated during his visit to India in November 2010 that the U.S. would support India as a permanent member to a reformed United Nations Security Council. The United States also removed India's defense and space-related entities from the U.S. "Entity List," opening the door for increased cooperation, technology transfer, and commercial sales in the defense and space industries. The United States agreed to set up a Global Disease Detection Center. and will work with India on its new Global Center for Nuclear Energy Partnership. The United States and India will partner globally to support food security in Africa and reconstruction in Afghanistan.

On July 23, 2010, Ambassador Roemer and Indian Home Affairs Secretary G.K. Pillai signed the Counterterrorism Cooperation Initiative. This agreement expands cooperation in several areas such as transportation security, border security, money laundering and terrorist financing, and megacity policing. The U.S. government also agreed to give the Government of India access to David Headley, one of the planners of the 26/11 terrorist attacks in Mumbai.

Ambassador Roemer presided over several high level visits including visits by Treasury Secretary Tim Geithner, Commerce Secretary Gary Locke, and Homeland Security Secretary Janet Napolitano. The first annual strategic dialogue meeting between the United States and India was held in June 2010 in Washington D.C., with the second scheduled for July 2011 in New Delhi.

During his two-year tenure, India moved up to be the 12th leading trade partner of the United States. In 2010, exports in goods from the United States to India were up 17 percent and two-way trade in goods increased 30 percent. During President Obama's visit to India, the United States announced 20 deals totaling $10 billion in U.S. exports that will lead to more than 50,000 jobs in America. During his tenure, the United States also pushed to make the G-20 the premier international economic body and reformed the IMF to give India greater representation.

Ambassador Roemer travelled throughout India during his two years, visiting 17 states. He was the first Ambassador in over 10 years to visit Jammu and Kashmir, including a September 20, 2010, visit to the city of Leh to bring relief supplies to 400 rural families affected by a recent flash flood.

In May 2011, Roemer received the Distinguished Alumnus Award from the University of Notre Dame and gave the commencement address to The Graduate School.

On April 26, 2011, he announced his resignation as Ambassador and returned to the U.S. A press release from the U.S. embassy in India stated ambassador Roemer leaving by June citing family reasons. Indian politician Shashi Tharoor wrote that Roemer resigned the post following India's decision to reject two American aircraft manufacturing tenders worth US$10 billion for the Indian MRCA competition.

== Personal life ==
Tim Roemer married Sally Johnston of Louisiana in 1989. They have four children: Patrick Hunter Roemer, Matthew Bennett Roemer, Sarah Kathryn Roemer, and Grace Elizabeth Roemer. Roemer is the son-in-law of J. Bennett Johnston and Mary (Gunn) Johnston. His father-in-law Johnston was a Democratic politician who served as a member of the United States Senate from Louisiana from 1972 to 1997.

The Roemers are Roman Catholic. When in Washington, they attend St. Thomas à Becket Catholic Church in Reston, Virginia.

== Citations ==
U.S. House of Representatives
| Preceded by John Hiler | Member of the U.S. House of Representatives from Indiana's 3rd congressional district 1991–2003 | Succeeded by Mark Souder |
Party political offices
| New office | Chair of the New Democrat Coalition; 1997–2001; Served alongside: Cal Dooley, Jim Moran | Succeeded by Jim Davis; Ron Kind; Adam Smith |
Diplomatic posts
| Preceded by Peter Burleigh; Acting | United States Ambassador to India; 2009–2011 | Succeeded by Peter Burleigh; Acting |
U.S. order of precedence (ceremonial)
| Preceded by Charles Boustany as Former U.S. Representative | Order of precedence of the United States as Former U.S. Representative | Succeeded by John Hostettler as Former U.S. Representative |
