= Fred L. Hadsel =

American diplomat

Fred Latimer Hadsel (March 11, 1916 Oxford, Ohio – April 11, 2010 Lexington, Virginia) was an American Career Foreign Service Officer who served as Ambassador Extraordinary and Plenipotentiary to Somalia (1969-1971 and Ghana (1971-1974).

Hadsel earned his undergraduate degree at Miami University, where his father was a professor of Latin, and a master's degree in history and international relations from Clark University and a doctoral degree in European history from the University of Chicago. He was married to Winifred Nelson Hadsel, and had three daughters (Mary Christine, Winifred, and Jane), and six grandchildren (Ruth Huffman, David Huffman, Tim Hadsel-Mares, Nick Hadsel-Mares, William Spooner, and Katharine Spooner).
