= Transition to Teaching =

The Transition to Teaching grant is a US Federal program intended to attract and retain mid-career professionals into the field of teaching at "high need" schools.

Candidates are paid a stipend of $1,000 per year for their first 2 years in order to ease the transition to the profession. During those two years, they are required to receive their teaching credential at their own expense. If they commit to a 3rd year, they receive an additional $3,000 stipend.

The program tends to benefit Teach For America candidates. Sometimes while a new teacher completes the requirements for the grant, the school is reclassified as no longer a "high-need" school; in that case, the newly arrived teacher does not receive any of the money upon completion of the certification and 3rd year commitment.
