= Donald G. Teitelbaum =

American diplomat

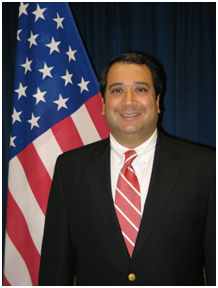
Donald G Teitelbaum ambassador

Donald Gene Teitelbaum served as the American ambassador to Ghana (2008–2012).

Teitelbaum earned a B.A. in foreign affairs from the University of Virginia in 1985.

Before his appointment in Ghana, he was Deputy Chief of Mission (DCM) in Pretoria, South Africa. He served as Chargé d'Affaires from August 2005 after the departure of Ambassador Jendayi Frazer until the July 27, 2006 arrival of Ambassador Eric M. Bost.
