= Kathryn Dee Robinson =

American diplomat

Kathryn Dee Robinson (born 1950) was the American Ambassador to Ghana from 1998 until 2001. She served as Consul General at the U.S. Embassy in Beijing beginning in 1988 and in Seoul since 1995.

Robinson earned a B.A. with honors from the University of Tennessee in Knoxville in 1972.
